= St. Louis Film Critics Association Award for Best Actress =

Annual US film award

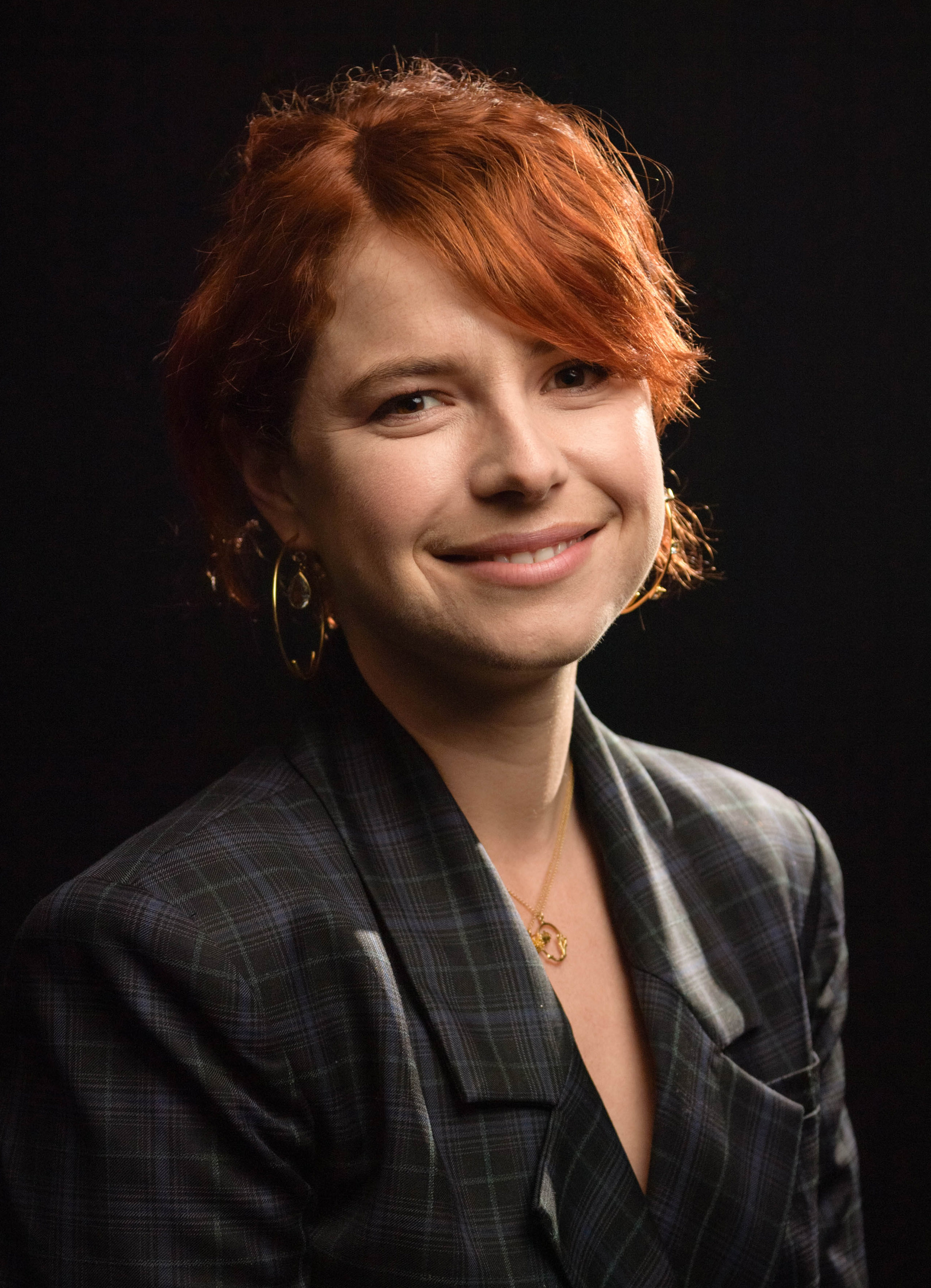
- Current recipient: Jessie Buckley
- Awarded for: Best Performance by an Actress in a Leading Role
- Country: United States
- Presented by: St. Louis Film Critics Association
- First award: Hilary Swank; Million Dollar Baby (2004)
- Currently held by: Jessie Buckley; Hamnet (2025)
- Website: stlfilmcritics.org

The St. Louis Film Critics Association Award for Best Actress is one of the annual awards given by the St. Louis Film Critics Association.

== Winners ==
- † – indicates the performance also won the Academy Award for Best Actress
- ‡ – indicates the performance was also nominated for the Academy Award for Best Actress

=== 2000s ===
Year	Nominee	Film	Role
2004	Hilary Swank †	Million Dollar Baby	Maggie Fitzgerald
2005	Judi Dench ‡	Mrs. Henderson Presents	Laura Henderson
2006	Helen Mirren †	The Queen	Queen Elizabeth II
2007	Elliot Page (Note: Credited as Ellen Page) ‡	Juno	Juno MacGuff
2008	Kate Winslet †	The Reader	Hanna Schmitz
2009	Carey Mulligan ‡	An Education	Jenny Mellor

=== 2010s ===
Year	Nominee	Film	Role
2010	Natalie Portman †	Black Swan	Nina Sayers
2010	Nicole Kidman ‡	Rabbit Hole	Rebecca "Becca" Corbett
2010	Jennifer Lawrence ‡	Winter's Bone	Ree
2010	Noomi Rapace	The Girl with the Dragon Tattoo	Lisbeth Salander
2010	Naomi Watts	Fair Game	Valerie Plame
2011	Rooney Mara ‡	The Girl with the Dragon Tattoo	Lisbeth Salander
2011	Viola Davis ‡	The Help	Aibileen Clarke
2011	Elizabeth Olsen	Martha Marcy May Marlene	Martha
2011	Saoirse Ronan	Hanna	Hanna
2011	Meryl Streep †	The Iron Lady	Margaret Thatcher
2011	Michelle Williams ‡	My Week with Marilyn	Marilyn Monroe
2012	Jessica Chastain ‡	Zero Dark Thirty	Maya Harris
2012	Jennifer Lawrence †	Silver Linings Playbook	Tiffany Maxwell
2012	Helen Mirren	Hitchcock	Alma Reville
2012	Aubrey Plaza	Safety Not Guaranteed	Darius Britt
2012	Quvenzhané Wallis ‡	Beasts of the Southern Wild	Hushpuppy
2013	Cate Blanchett †	Blue Jasmine	Jeanette "Jasmine" Francis
2013	Amy Adams ‡	American Hustle	Sydney Prosser / Lady Edith Greensly
2013	Sandra Bullock ‡	Gravity	Dr. Ryan Stone
2013	Judi Dench ‡	Philomena	Philomena Lee
2013	Meryl Streep ‡	August: Osage County	Violet Weston
2013	Emma Thompson	Saving Mr. Banks	P. L. Travers
2014	Rosamund Pike ‡	Gone Girl	Amy Elliot Dunne
2014	Marion Cotillard ‡	Two Days, One Night	Sandra Bya
2014	Felicity Jones ‡	The Theory of Everything	Jane Hawking
2014	Julianne Moore †	Still Alice	Alice Daly Howland
2014	Reese Witherspoon ‡	Wild	Cheryl Strayed
2015	Brie Larson †	Room	Joy "Ma" Newsome
2015	Cate Blanchett ‡	Carol	Carol Aird
2015	Saoirse Ronan ‡	Brooklyn	Eilis Lacey
2015	Charlize Theron	Mad Max: Fury Road	Imperator Furiosa
2015	Alicia Vikander	The Danish Girl	Gerda Wegener
2016	Isabelle Huppert ‡	Elle	Michèle Leblanc
2016	Amy Adams	Arrival	Louise Banks
2016	Ruth Negga ‡	Loving	Mildred Delores Loving
2016	Natalie Portman ‡	Jackie	Jackie Kennedy
2016	Emma Stone †	La La Land	Mia Dolan
2017	Frances McDormand †	Three Billboards Outside Ebbing, Missouri	Mildred Hayes
2017	Sally Hawkins ‡	The Shape of Water	Elisa Esposito
2017	Saoirse Ronan ‡	Lady Bird	Christine "Lady Bird" McPherson
2017	Kristen Stewart	Personal Shopper	Maureen Cartwright
2017	Meryl Streep ‡	The Post	Katharine Graham
2018	Toni Collette	Hereditary	Annie Graham
2018	Glenn Close ‡	The Wife	Joan Castleman
2018	Olivia Colman †	The Favourite	Queen Anne
2018	Lady Gaga ‡	A Star is Born	Ally Maine
2018	Charlize Theron	Tully	Marlo Moreau
2019	Scarlett Johansson ‡	Marriage Story	Nicole Barber
2019	Cynthia Erivo ‡	Harriet	Harriet Tubman
2019	Saoirse Ronan ‡	Little Women	Josephine "Jo" March
2019	Charlize Theron ‡	Bombshell	Megyn Kelly
2019	Renée Zellweger †	Judy	Judy Garland

=== 2020s ===
Year	Nominee	Film	Role
2020	Carey Mulligan ‡	Promising Young Woman	Cassandra
2020	Jessie Buckley	I'm Thinking of Ending Things	Young Woman
2020	Viola Davis ‡	Ma Rainey's Black Bottom	Ma Rainey
2020	Vanessa Kirby ‡	Pieces of a Woman	Martha Weiss
2020	Frances McDormand †	Nomadland	Fern
2021	Kristen Stewart ‡	Spencer	Diana, Princess of Wales
2021	Jessica Chastain †	The Eyes of Tammy Faye	Tammy Faye Baker
2021	Olivia Colman ‡	The Lost Daughter	Leda Caruso
2021	Lady Gaga	House of Gucci	Patrizia Reggiani
2021	Nicole Kidman ‡	Being the Ricardos	Lucille Ball
2022	Michelle Yeoh †	Everything Everywhere All at Once	Evelyn Wang
2022	Cate Blanchett ‡	Tár	Lydia Tár
2022	Danielle Deadwyler	Till	Mamie Till
2022	Mia Goth	Pearl	Pearl
2022	Emma Thompson	Good Luck to You, Leo Grande	Nancy Stokes / Susan Robinson
2022	Michelle Williams ‡	The Fabelmans	Mitzi Fabelman
2023
2023	Lily Gladstone ‡	Killers of the Flower Moon	Mollie Kyle
2023	Greta Lee	Past Lives	Nora Moon
2023	Natalie Portman	May December	Elizabeth Berry
2023	Margot Robbie	Barbie	Barbie
2023	Emma Stone †	Poor Things	Bella Baxter
2024	Mikey Madison †	Anora	Anora "Ani" Mikheeva
2024	Pamela Anderson	The Last Showgirl	Shelly
2024	Cynthia Erivo ‡	Wicked	Elphaba Thropp
2024	Marianne Jean-Baptiste	Hard Truths	Pansey
2024	Demi Moore ‡	The Substance	Elisabeth Sparkle
2024	Saoirse Ronan	The Outrun	Rona
2025	Jessie Buckley †	Hamnet	Agnes Shakespeare
2025	Rose Byrne ‡	If I Had Legs I'd Kick You	Linda
2025	Chase Infiniti	One Battle After Another	Willa Ferguson
2025	Amanda Seyfried	The Testament of Ann Lee	Ann Lee
2025	Emma Stone ‡	Bugonia	Michelle Fuller
