= St. Louis Film Critics Association Award for Best Animated Feature =

Annual US film award

The St. Louis Film Critics Association Award for Best Animated Feature is an award given by the St. Louis Film Critics Association, honoring the finest achievements in animated filmmaking.

== History ==
Toy Story was the only franchise with multiple wins, winning two times for Toy Story 3 (2010) and Toy Story 4 (2019) until the Spider-Verse and Zootopia franchises won two times for their respective films, with Spider-Man: Into the Spider-Verse (2018) and Spider-Man: Across the Spider-Verse (2023), and Zootopia (2016) and Zootopia 2 (2025).

== Winners ==
indicates the winners.

=== 2000s ===
Year	Winner	Director
2004
2004	The Incredibles	Brad Bird
2004	Shark Tale	Vicky Jenson
2004	Shrek 2	Andrew Adamson and Kelly Asbury
2005	no award given	
2006
2006	Cars	John Lasseter and Joe Ranft
2006	Happy Feet	George Miller
2006	Monster House	Gil Kenan
2007
2007	Ratatouille	Brad Bird and Jan Pinkava
2007	Bee Movie	Steve Hickner and Simon J. Smith
2007	Surf's Up	Ash Brannon and Chris Buck
2008
2008	WALL-E	Andrew Stanton
2008	Bolt	Chris Williams and Byron Howard
2008	Kung Fu Panda	John Wayne Stevenson and Mark Osborne
2009
2009	Up	Pete Docter
2009	Cloudy with a Chance of Meatballs	Phil Lord and Christopher Miller
2009	Coraline	Henry Selick
2009	Fantastic Mr. Fox	Wes Anderson
2009	The Princess and the Frog	Ron Clements and John Musker

=== 2010s ===
Year	Winner	Director
2010
2010	Toy Story 3	Lee Unkrich
2010	Despicable Me	Pierre Coffin and Chris Renaud
2010	How To Train Your Dragon	Chris Sanders and Dean DeBlois
2010	The Illusionist (L'Illusionniste)	Sylvain Chomet
2010	Tangled	Nathan Greno and Byron Howard
2011
2011	The Adventures of Tintin: The Secret of the Unicorn	Steven Spielberg
2011	Cars 2	John Lasseter and Brad Lewis
2011	Kung Fu Panda 2	Jennifer Yuh Nelson
2011	Puss in Boots	Chris Miller
2011	Rio	Carlos Saldanha
2012
2012	Wreck-It Ralph	Rich Moore
2012	Brave	Mark Andrews and Brenda Chapman
2012	Frankenweenie	Tim Burton
2012	Hotel Transylvania	Genndy Tartakovsky
2012	Rise of the Guardians	Peter Ramsey and William Joyce
2013
2013	Frozen	Chris Buck and Jennifer Lee
2013	The Croods	Chris Sanders
2013	Despicable Me 2	Pierre Coffin and Chris Renaud
2013	Monsters University	Dan Scanlon
2013	The Wind Rises	Hayao Miyazaki
2014
2014	The Lego Movie	Phil Lord and Christopher Miller
2014	Big Hero 6	Don Hall and Chris Williams
2014	The Boxtrolls	Anthony Stacchi and Graham Annable
2014	How to Train Your Dragon 2	Dean DeBlois
2014	Rio 2	Carlos Saldanha
2015
2015	Inside Out	Pete Docter and Ronnie del Carmen
2015	Anomalisa	Charlie Kaufman and Duke Johnson
2015	The Good Dinosaur	Peter Sohn
2015	The Peanuts Movie	Steve Martino
2015	Shaun the Sheep Movie	Richard Starzak and Mark Burton
2016
2016	Zootopia	Byron Howard and Rich Moore
2016	April and the Extraordinary World	Christian Desmares and Franck Ekinci
2016	Finding Dory	Andrew Stanton
2016	Kubo and the Two Strings	Travis Knight
2016	Moana	Ron Clements and John Musker
2017
2017	Coco	Lee Unkrich
2017	Captain Underpants: The First Epic Movie	David Soren
2017	Despicable Me 3	Pierre Coffin and Kyle Balda
2017	The Lego Batman Movie	Chris McKay
2017	Loving Vincent	Dorota Kobiela and Hugh Welchman
2018
2018	Spider-Man: Into the Spider-Verse	Bob Persichetti, Peter Ramsey and Rodney Rothman
2018	Hotel Transylvania 3: Summer Vacation	Genndy Tartakovsky
2018	Incredibles 2	Brad Bird
2018	Isle of Dogs	Wes Anderson
2018	Ralph Breaks the Internet	Rich Moore and Phil Johnston
2019
2019	Toy Story 4	Josh Cooley
2019	Frozen 2	Chris Buck and Jennifer Lee
2019	How to Train Your Dragon: The Hidden World	Dean DeBlois
2019	Klaus	Sergio Pablos
2019	Missing Link	Chris Butler

=== 2020s ===
Year	Winner	Director
2020
2020	Soul	Pete Docter and Kemp Powers
2020	Onward	Dan Scanlon
2020	Over the Moon	Glen Keane
2020	The Wolf House	Joaquín Cociña and Cristobal León
2020	Wolfwalkers	Tomm Moore and Ross Stewart
2021
2021	The Mitchells vs. the Machines	Mike Rianda
2021	Encanto	Jared Bush and Byron Howard
2021	Flee	Jonas Poher Rasmussen
2021	Luca	Enrico Casarosa
2021	Vivo	Kirk DeMicco
2022
2022	Marcel the Shell with Shoes On	Dean Fleischer Camp
2022	Apollo 10 1/2: A Space Age Childhood	Richard Linklater
2022	Guillermo del Toro's Pinocchio	Guillermo del Toro
2022	Turning Red	Domee Shi
2022	Wendell & Wild	Henry Selick
2023
2023	Spider-Man: Across the Spider-Verse	Joaquim Dos Santos, Kemp Powers and Justin K. Thompson
2023	The Boy and the Heron	Hayao Miyazaki
2023	Elemental	Peter Sohn
2023	Robot Dreams	Pablo Berger
2023	Teenage Mutant Ninja Turtles: Mutant Mayhem	Jeff Rowe
2024
2024	The Wild Robot	Chris Sanders
2024	Flow	Gints Zilbalodis
2024	Inside Out 2	Kelsey Mann
2024	Memoir of a Snail	Adam Elliot
2024	Wallace & Gromit: Vengeance Most Fowl	Nick Park and Merlin Crossingham
2025
2025	Zootopia 2	Jared Bush and Byron Howard
2025	KPop Demon Hunters	Maggie Kang and Chris Appelhans
2025	Arco	Ugo Bienvenu
2025	Elio	Madeline Sharafian, Domee Shi and Adrian Molina
2025	Ne Zha 2	Jiaozi
