= St. Louis Film Critics Association Award for Best Actor =

Annual film award

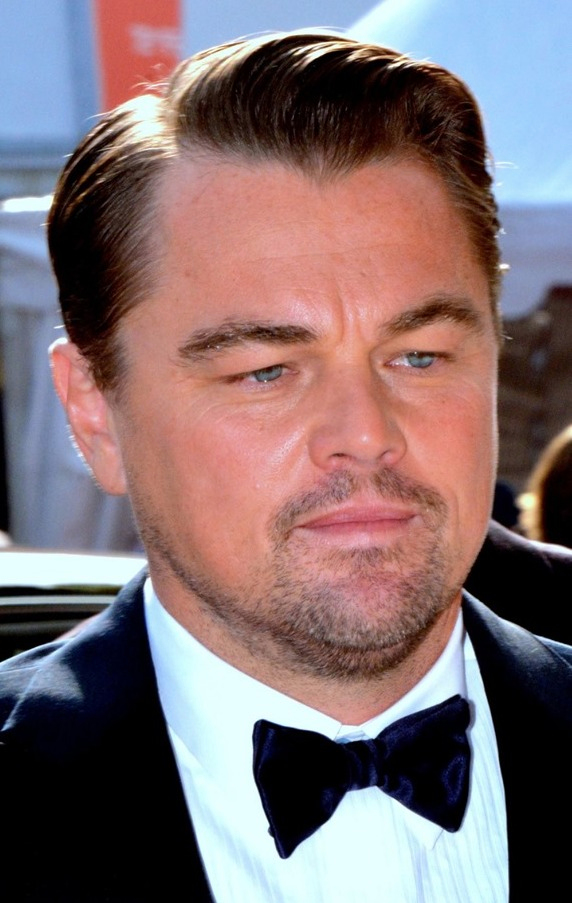
- Current recipient: Leonardo DiCaprio
- Awarded for: Best Performance by an Actor in a Leading Role
- Country: United States
- Presented by: St. Louis Film Critics Association
- First award: Jamie Foxx; Ray (2004)
- Currently held by: Leonardo DiCaprio; One Battle After Another (2025)
- Website: stlfilmcritics.org

The St. Louis Film Critics Association Award for Best Actor is one of the annual awards given by the St. Louis Film Critics Association.

== Winners ==
- † – indicates the performance also won the Academy Award for Best Actor
- ‡ – indicates the performance was also nominated for the Academy Award for Best Actor

=== 2000s ===
Year	Recipient	Film	Role	Ref.
2004	Jamie Foxx †	Ray	Ray Charles	
2005	Heath Ledger ‡	Brokeback Mountain	Ennis Del Mar	
2006	Forest Whitaker †	The Last King of Scotland	Idi Amin	
2007	Daniel Day-Lewis †	There Will Be Blood	Daniel Plainview	
2008	Sean Penn †	Milk	Harvey Milk	
2009	George Clooney ‡	Up in the Air	Ryan Bingham	

=== 2010s ===
Year	Recipient	Film	Role	Ref.
2010	Colin Firth †	The King's Speech	King George VI	
2011	George Clooney ‡	The Descendants	Matt King	
2012	Daniel Day-Lewis †	Lincoln	Abraham Lincoln	
2013	Chiwetel Ejiofor ‡	12 Years a Slave	Solomon Northup	
2014	Jake Gyllenhaal	Nightcrawler	Lou Bloom	
2015	Leonardo DiCaprio †	The Revenant	Hugh Glass	
2016	Casey Affleck †	Manchester by the Sea	Lee Chandler	
2017	Gary Oldman †	Darkest Hour	Winston Churchill	
2018	Ethan Hawke	First Reformed	Ernst Toller	
2019	Adam Sandler	Uncut Gems	Howard Ratner	

=== 2020s ===
Year	Recipient	Film	Role	Ref.
2020	Chadwick Boseman ‡	Ma Rainey's Black Bottom	Levee Green	
2021	Nicolas Cage	Pig	Robin "Rob" Feld	
2022	Brendan Fraser †	The Whale	Charlie	
2023	Cillian Murphy †	Oppenheimer	J. Robert Oppenheimer	
2024	Colman Domingo ‡	Sing Sing	John "Divine G" Whitfield	
2025	Leonardo DiCaprio ‡	One Battle After Another	Bob Ferguson	
