= St. Louis Film Critics Association Award for Best Director =

Annual US film award

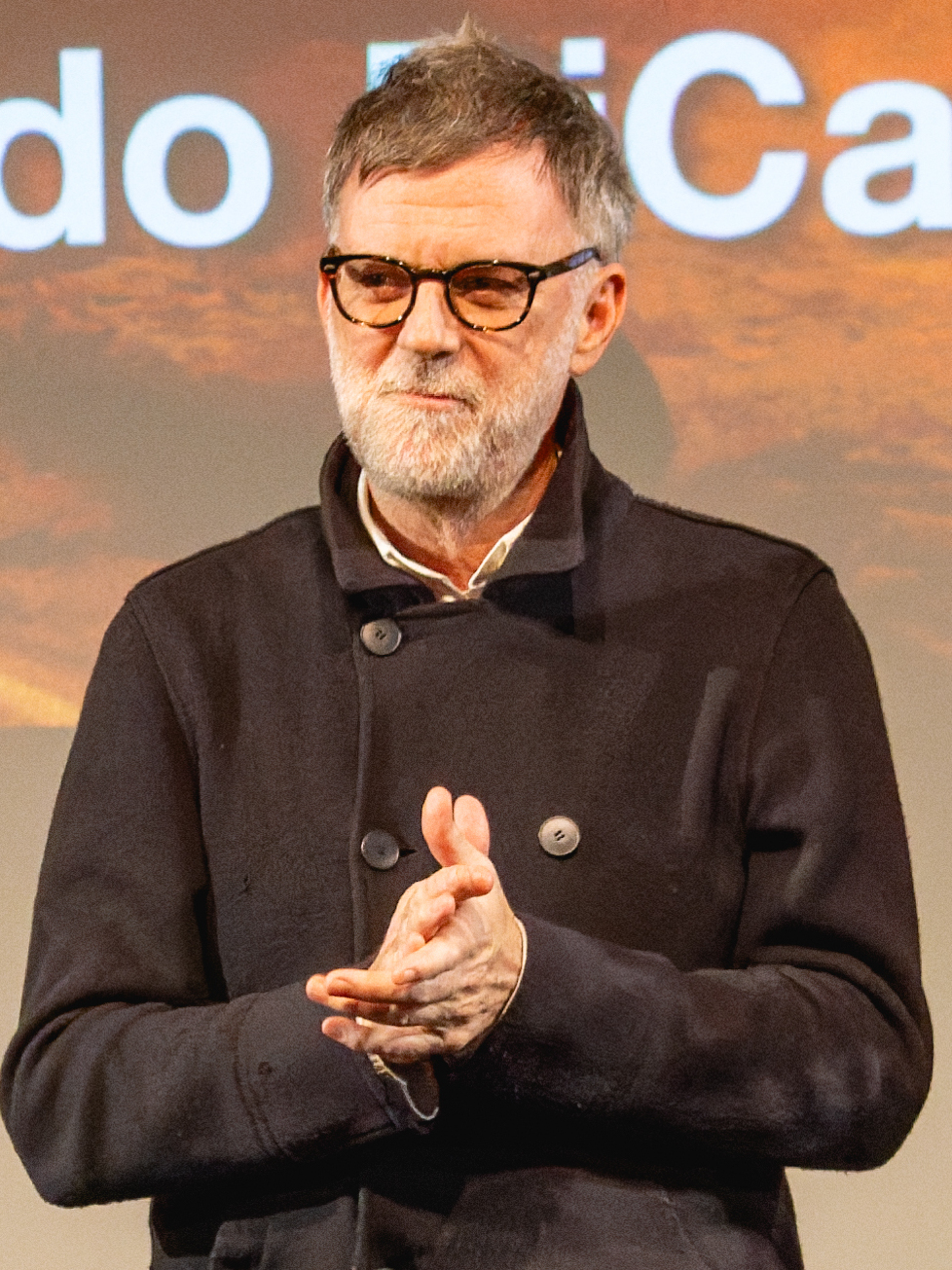
- The 2025 recipient: Paul Thomas Anderson
- Country: United States
- Presented by: St. Louis Film Critics Association
- First award: Martin Scorsese, The Aviator (2004)
- Most recent winner: Paul Thomas Anderson, One Battle After Another (2025)
- Website: www.stlfilmcritics.org

The St. Louis Film Critics Association Award for Best Director is one of the annual awards given by the St. Louis Film Critics Association.

== Winners ==
Winners are in bold.

=== 2000s ===
Year	Nominee	Film
2004	**Martin Scorsese** – (Drama)	**The Aviator**
2004	Clint Eastwood – (Drama)	Million Dollar Baby
2004	Terry George – (Drama)	Hotel Rwanda
2004	Mike Leigh – (Drama)	Vera Drake
2004	Quentin Tarantino – (Drama)	Kill Bill: Volume 2
2004	**Alexander Payne** – (Comedy / Musical)	**Sideways**
2004	Taylor Hackford – (Comedy / Musical)	Ray
2004	Michael Gondry – (Comedy / Musical)	Eternal Sunshine of the Spotless Mind
2004	Zach Braff – (Comedy / Musical)	Garden State
2004	Brad Bird – (Comedy / Musical)	The Incredibles
2005	**Ang Lee**	**Brokeback Mountain**
2006	**Martin Scorsese**	**The Departed**
2007	**Joel Coen and Ethan Coen**	**No Country for Old Men**
2008	**Danny Boyle**	**Slumdog Millionaire**
2009	**Kathryn Bigelow**	**The Hurt Locker**

=== 2010s ===
Year	Nominee	Film
2010	**David Fincher**	**The Social Network**
2011	**Michel Hazanavicius**	**The Artist**
2011	Terrence Malick	The Tree of Life
2011	Alexander Payne	The Descendants
2011	David Fincher	The Girl with the Dragon Tattoo
2011	Nicolas Winding Refn	Drive
2012	**Ben Affleck**	**Argo**
2012	Kathryn Bigelow	Zero Dark Thirty
2012	Quentin Tarantino	Django Unchained
2012	Benh Zeitlin	Beasts of the Southern Wild
2012	Ang Lee	Life of Pi
2013	Alfonso Cuaron	Gravity
2013	Spike Jonze	Her
2013	**Steve McQueen**	**12 Years a Slave**
2013	Alexander Payne	Nebraska
2013	David O. Russell	American Hustle
2014	Wes Anderson	The Grand Budapest Hotel
2014	David Fincher	Gone Girl
2014	**Alejandro G. Iñárritu**	**Birdman or (The Unexpected Virtue of Ignorance)**
2014	Richard Linklater	Boyhood
2014	Morten Tyldum	The Imitation Game
2015	Todd Haynes	Carol
2015	Alejandro González Iñárritu	The Revenant
2015	**Tom McCarthy**	**Spotlight**
2015	George Miller	Mad Max: Fury Road
2015	Ridley Scott	The Martian
2016	**Damien Chazelle**	**La La Land**
2016	Barry Jenkins	Moonlight
2016	Kenneth Lonergan	Manchester by the Sea
2016	David Mackenzie	Hell or High Water
2016	Denis Villeneuve	Arrival
2017	**Guillermo del Toro**	**The Shape of Water**
2017	Greta Gerwig	Lady Bird
2017	Jordan Peele	Get Out
2017	Steven Spielberg	The Post
2017	Denis Villeneuve	Blade Runner 2049
2018	Bradley Cooper	A Star Is Born
2018	Alfonso Cuarón	Roma
2018	Yorgos Lanthimos	The Favourite
2018	**Spike Lee**	**BlacKkKlansman**
2018	Adam McKay	Vice
2019	Bong Joon-Ho	Parasite
2019	Sam Mendes	1917
2019	Martin Scorsese	The Irishman
2019	**Quentin Tarantino**	**Once Upon a Time in Hollywood**
2019	Taika Waititi	Jojo Rabbit

=== 2020s ===
Year	Nominee	Film
2020	Emerald Fennell	Promising Young Woman
2020	Lee Isaac Chung	Minari
2020	Spike Lee	Da 5 Bloods
2020	Aaron Sorkin	The Trial of the Chicago 7
2020	**Chloé Zhao**	**Nomadland**
2021	Paul Thomas Anderson	Licorice Pizza
2021	Wes Anderson	The French Dispatch
2021	Kenneth Branagh	Belfast
2021	**Jane Campion**	**The Power of the Dog**
2021	Steven Spielberg	West Side Story
2021	Denis Villeneuve	Dune
2022	Daniels (Daniel Kwan & Daniel Scheinert)	Everything Everywhere All at Once
2022	Baz Luhrmann	Elvis
2022	Martin McDonagh	Banshees of Inisherin
2022	**Sarah Polley**	**Women Talking**
2022	Steven Spielberg	The Fabelmans
2023	Greta Gerwig	Barbie
2023	Todd Haynes	May December
2023	**Christopher Nolan**	**Oppenheimer**
2023	Martin Scorsese	Killers of the Flower Moon
2023	Celine Song	Past Lives
2024	Edward Berger	Conclave
2024	Brady Corbet	The Brutalist
2024	Mohammad Rasoulof	The Seed of the Sacred Fig
2024	RaMell Ross	Nickel Boys
2024	**Denis Villeneuve**	**Dune: Part Two**
2025	**Paul Thomas Anderson**	**One Battle After Another**
2025	Ryan Coogler	Sinners
2025	Jafar Panahi	One Battle After Another
2025	Josh Safdie	Marty Supreme
2025	Chloé Zhao	Hamnet
