= St. Louis Film Critics Association Award for Best Film =

Annual US film award

The St. Louis Film Critics Association Award for Best Film is one of the annual awards given by the St. Louis Film Critics Association.

== Winners ==
=== 2000s ===
Year	Film	Director
2004	The Aviator	Martin Scorsese
2005	Brokeback Mountain	Ang Lee
2006	The Departed	Martin Scorsese
2007	No Country for Old Men	Joel Coen and Ethan Coen
2008	The Curious Case of Benjamin Button	David Fincher
2009	Up in the Air	Jason Reitman

=== 2010s ===
Year	Film	Director
2010	The Social Network	David Fincher
2011	The Artist	Michel Hazanavicius
2012	Argo	Ben Affleck
2013	12 Years a Slave	Steve McQueen
2014	Boyhood	Richard Linklater
2015	Spotlight	Tom McCarthy
2016	La La Land	Damien Chazelle
2017	The Shape of Water	Guillermo del Toro
2018	A Star Is Born	Bradley Cooper
2019	Once Upon a Time in Hollywood	Quentin Tarantino

=== 2020s ===
Year	Film	Director
2020	Nomadland	Chloé Zhao
2021	Licorice Pizza	Paul Thomas Anderson
2022	Everything Everywhere All at Once	Daniel Kwan & Daniel Sheinert
2023	Oppenheimer	Christopher Nolan
2024	Dune: Part Two	Denis Villeneuve
