= St. Louis Film Critics Association Award for Best Supporting Actor =

Annual US film award

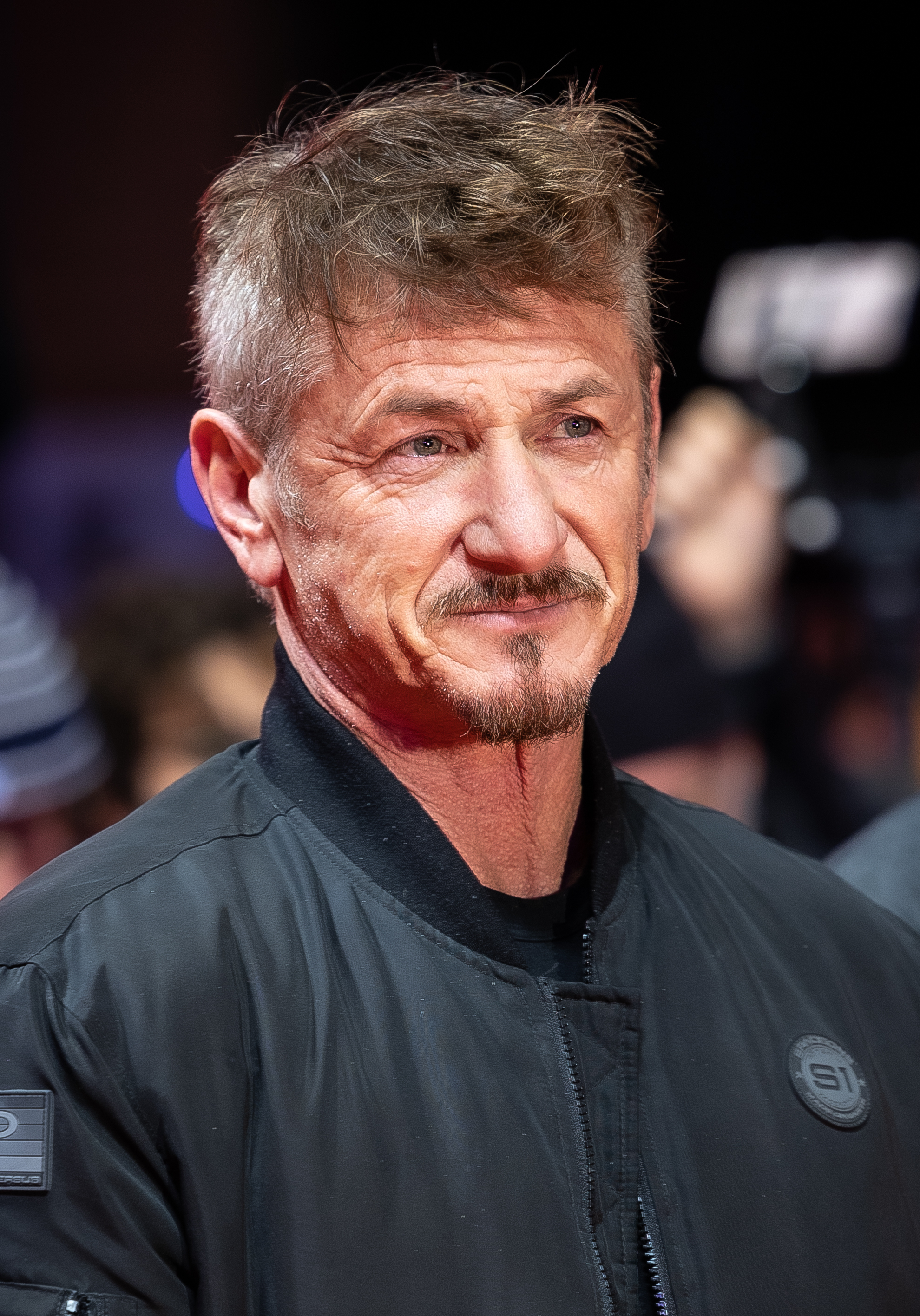
- Current recipient: Sean Penn
- Awarded for: Best Performance by an Actor in a Supporting Role
- Country: United States
- Presented by: St. Louis Film Critics Association
- First award: Thomas Haden Church; Sideways (2004)
- Currently held by: Sean Penn; One Battle After Another (2025)
- Website: stlfilmcritics.org

The St. Louis Film Critics Association Award for Best Supporting Actor is one of the annual awards given by the St. Louis Film Critics Association.

== Winners ==
- † – indicates the performance also won the Academy Award for Best Supporting Actor
- ‡ – indicates the performance was also nominated for the Academy Award for Best Supporting Actor

=== 2000s ===
Year	Winner	Film	Role
2004	Thomas Haden Church ‡	Sideways	Jack Cole
2005	George Clooney †	Syriana	Bob Barnes
2006	Djimon Hounsou ‡	Blood Diamond	Solomon Vandy
2007	Casey Affleck ‡	The Assassination of Jesse James by the Coward Robert Ford	Robert Ford
2008	Heath Ledger (posthumously) †	The Dark Knight	The Joker
2009	Christoph Waltz †	Inglourious Basterds	Col. Hans Landa

=== 2010s ===
Year	Winner	Film	Role
2010	Christian Bale †	The Fighter	Dicky Eklund
2011	Albert Brooks	Drive	Bernie Rose
2012	Christoph Waltz †	Django Unchained	Dr. King Schultz
2013	Jared Leto †	Dallas Buyers Club	Rayon
2014	J. K. Simmons †	Whiplash	Terence Fletcher
2015	Sylvester Stallone ‡	Creed	Rocky Balboa
2016	Mahershala Ali †	Moonlight	Juan
2017	Richard Jenkins ‡	The Shape of Water	Giles
2018	Richard E. Grant ‡	Can You Ever Forgive Me?	Jack Hock
2019	Brad Pitt †	Once Upon a Time in Hollywood	Cliff Booth

=== 2020s ===
Year	Winner	Film	Role
2020	Paul Raci ‡	Sound of Metal	Joe
2021	Kodi Smit-McPhee ‡	The Power of the Dog	Peter Gordon
2022	Ke Huy Quan †	Everything Everywhere All at Once	Waymond Wang
2023	Ryan Gosling ‡	Barbie	Ken
2024	Kieran Culkin †	A Real Pain	Benji Kaplan
2025	Sean Penn †	One Battle After Another	Col. Steven J. Lockjaw
