= St. Louis Film Critics Association Award for Best Supporting Actress =

Annual US film award

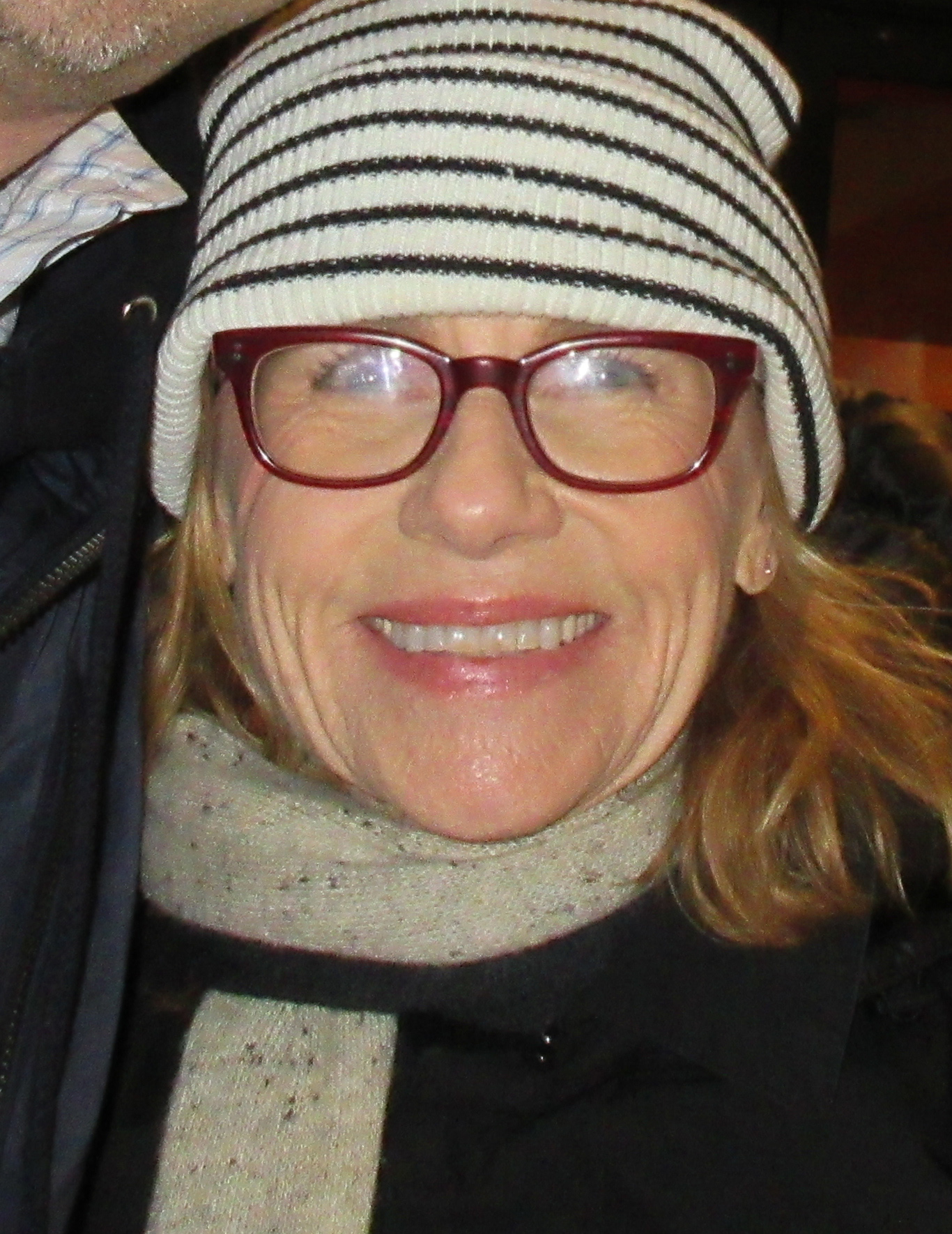
- The 2026 recipient: Amy Madigan
- Awarded for: Best Performance by an Actress in a Supporting Role
- Country: United States
- Presented by: St. Louis Film Critics Association
- First award: Cate Blanchett; The Aviator (2004)
- Currently held by: Amy Madigan; Weapons (2025)
- Website: stlfilmcritics.org

The St. Louis Film Critics Association Award for Best Supporting Actress is one of the annual awards given by the St. Louis Film Critics Association.

== Winners ==
- † – indicates the performance also won the Academy Award for Best Supporting Actress
- ‡ – indicates the performance was also nominated for the Academy Award for Best Supporting Actress

=== 2000s ===
| Year | Nominee | Film | Role |
|---|---|---|---|
| 2004 | Cate Blanchett † | The Aviator | Katharine Hepburn |
| 2005 | Rachel Weisz † | The Constant Gardener | Tessa Abbott-Quayle |
| 2006 | Jennifer Hudson † | Dreamgirls | Effie White |
| 2007 | Amy Ryan ‡ | Gone Baby Gone | Helene McCready |
| 2008 | Viola Davis ‡ | Doubt | Mrs. Miller |
| 2009 | Mo'Nique † | Precious | Mary Lee Johnston |

=== 2010s ===
| Year | Nominee | Film | Role |
|---|---|---|---|
| 2010 | Melissa Leo † | The Fighter | Alice Eklund |
| 2011 | Bérénice Bejo ‡ | The Artist | Peppy Miller |
| 2012 | Ann Dowd | Compliance | Sandra |
| 2012 | Helen Hunt ‡ | The Sessions | Cheryl Cohen-Greene |
| 2013 | Lupita Nyong'o † | 12 Years a Slave | Patsey |
| 2014 | Patricia Arquette † | Boyhood | Olivia Evans |
| 2015 | Alicia Vikander | Ex Machina | Ava |
| 2016 | Viola Davis † | Fences | Rose Maxson |
| 2017 | Laurie Metcalf ‡ | Lady Bird | Marion McPherson |
| 2018 | Regina King † | If Beale Street Could Talk | Sharon Rivers |
| 2019 | Margot Robbie ‡ | Bombshell | Kayla Popisil |

=== 2020s ===
| Year | Nominee | Film | Role |
|---|---|---|---|
| 2020 | Youn Yuh-jung † | Minari | Soon-ja |
| 2021 | Ann Dowd | Mass | Linda |
| 2022 | Kerry Condon ‡ | The Banshees of Inisherin | Siobhán Súilleabháin |
| 2023 | Da'Vine Joy Randolph † | The Holdovers | Mary Lamb |
| 2024 | Aunjanue Ellis-Taylor | Nickel Boys | Hattie |
| 2025 | Amy Madigan † | Weapons | Gladys |
