= St. Louis Film Critics Association Award for Best Documentary Feature =

Film contest

The St. Louis Film Critics Association Award for Best Documentary Feature is an award given by the St. Louis Film Critics Association, honoring the finest achievements in documentary filmmaking.

== Winners ==
=== 2000s ===
Year	Film	Director(s)	Nominees
2004	Fahrenheit 9/11	Michael Moore	
2005	March of the Penguins	Luc Jacquet	The Aristocrats — Penn Jillette and Paul Provenza; Born into Brothels — Zana Briski and Ross Kauffman; Enron: The Smartest Guys in the Room — Alex Gibney; Grizzly Man — Werner Herzog; Mad Hot Ballroom — Marilyn Agrelo; Murderball — Henry Alex Rubin and Dana Adam Shapiro; The Wild Parrots of Telegraph Hill — Judy Irvin
2006	An Inconvenient Truth	Davis Guggenheim	Deliver Us from Evil — Amy J. Berg; The Heart of the Game — Ward Serrill; Iraq for Sale: The War Profiteers — Robert Greenwald; Why We Fight — Eugene Jarecki
2007	Sicko	Michael Moore	In the Shadow of the Moon — David Sington and Christopher Riley; The King of Kong — Seth Gordon; Manufactured Landscapes — Jennifer Baichwal; No End in Sight — Charles H. Ferguson
2008	Man on Wire	James Marsh	Body of War — Ellen Spiro and Phil Donahue; Pray the Devil Back to Hell — Gini Reticker; Shine a Light — Martin Scorsese; Standard Operating Procedure — Errol Morris
2009	Capitalism: A Love Story	Michael Moore	Anvil! The Story of Anvil — Sacha Gervasi; Food, Inc. — Robert Kenner; Good Hair — Jeff Stilson; Tyson — James Toback

=== 2010s ===
Year	Film	Director(s)	Nominees
2016	I Am Not Your Negro	Raoul Peck	Weiner‡ — Josh Kriegman and Elyse Steinberg; De Palma — Noah Baumbach and Jake Paltrow; The Eagle Huntress — Otto Bell; Gleason — Clay Tweel
2017	Jane	Brett Morgen	City of Ghosts — Matthew Heineman; Last Men in Aleppo — Feras Fayyad; Never Say Goodbye: The KSHE Documentary — Jefferson Arca; Whose Streets? — Sabaah Folayan and Damon Davis
2018	Won't You Be My Neighbor?	Morgan Neville	Free Solo — Elizabeth Chai Vasarhelyi and Jimmy Chin; RBG — Julie Cohen and Betsy West; Science Fair — Cristina Costantini and Darren Foster; Three Identical Strangers — Tim Wardle
2019	Apollo 11	Todd Douglas Miller	The Biggest Little Farm — John Chester; Honeyland — Tamara Kotevska and Ljubomir Stefanov; Linda Ronstadt: The Sound of My Voice — Rob Epstein and Jeffrey Friedman; Where's My Roy Cohn? — Matt Tyrnauer
2020	Collective	Alexander Nanau	City Hall — Frederick Wiseman; Dick Johnson Is Dead — Kirsten Johnson; My Octopus Teacher — Pippa Ehrlich and James Reed; The Social Dilemma — Jeff Orlowski
2021	Flee	Jonas Poher Rasmussen	The Rescue — Elizabeth Chai Vasarhelyi and Jimmy Chin; Summer of Soul — Questlove; The Velvet Underground — Todd Haynes; Tina — Daniel Lindsay and T. J. Martin
2022	All the Beauty and the Bloodshed	Laura Poitras	Fire of Love — Sara Dosa; Good Night Oppy — Ryan White; Moonage Daydream — Brett Morgen; Sr. — Chris Smith
2023	American Symphony / Still: A Michael J. Fox Movie	Matthew Heineman / Davis Guggenheim	Beyond Utopia — Madeleine Gavin; It Ain't Over — Sean Mullin; Menus-Plaisirs – Les Troisgros — Frederick Wiseman
2024	No Other Land	Basel Adra, Hamdan Ballal, Yuval Abraham and Rachel Szor	Daughters — Natalie Rae and Angela Patton; Music by John Williams — Laurent Bouzereau; Sugarcane — Julian Brave NoiseCat and Emily Kassie; Super/Man: The Christopher Reeve Story — Ian Bonhôte and Peter Ettedgui; Will & Harper — Josh Greenbaum
2025	Orwell: 2+2=5	Raoul Peck	2000 Meters to Andriivka — Mstyslav Chernov; Afternoons of Solitude — Albert Serra; Deaf President Now! — Nyle DiMarco and Davis Guggenheim; The Perfect Neighbor — Geeta Gandbhir

‡ Runner-up
