= St. Louis Film Critics Association Award for Best Cinematography =

Annual US film award

The St. Louis Film Critics Association Award for Best Cinematography is one of the annual awards given by the St. Louis Film Critics Association.

== Winners ==
=== 2000s ===
Year	Film	Cinematographer(s)
2004	House of Flying Daggers	Zhao Xiaoding
2006	The Painted Veil	Stuart Dryburgh
2007	The Assassination of Jesse James by the Coward Robert Ford	Roger Deakins
2008	Australia	Mandy Walker
2009	Nine	Dion Beebe

=== 2010s ===
Year	Film	Cinematographer(s)
2010	Not awarded	
2011	The Tree of Life	Emmanuel Lubezki
2012	Skyfall	Roger Deakins
2013	12 Years a Slave	Sean Bobbitt
2014	Not awarded	
2015	The Revenant	Emmanuel Lubezki
2016	La La Land	Linus Sandgren
2017	Blade Runner 2049	Roger Deakins
2018	Roma	Alfonso Cuarón
2019	1917	Roger Deakins

=== 2020s ===
Year	Film	Cinematographer(s)
2020	Nomadland	Joshua James Richards
