= List of accolades received by The Constant Gardener (film) =

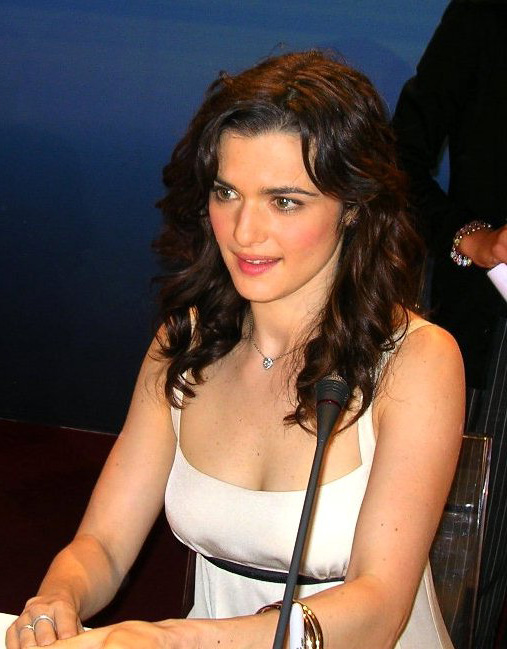
- Rachel Weisz received multiple awards for her performance in the film.
Accolades
Award	Wins	Nominations
AARP Movies for Grownups Awards	1	1
Academy Awards	1	4
ACE Eddie Awards	0	1
African-American Film Critics Association	1	1
ALMA Awards	1	1
Art Directors Guild Awards	0	1
British Academy Film Awards	1	10
British Independent Film Awards	3	7
British Society of Cinematographers Awards	0	1
Cannes Film Festival	1	1
Chicago Film Critics Association	0	1
Critics' Choice Awards	0	2
Dallas–Fort Worth Film Critics Association	0	1
Empire Awards	0	1
European Film Awards	0	1
Evening Standard British Film Awards	2	2
Golden Globe Awards	1	3
Goya Awards	0	1
Grande Prêmio do Cinema Brasileiro	1	1
Imagen Awards	0	1
International Cinephile Society	1	2
London Film Critics' Circle	4	7
Motion Picture Sound Editors Golden Reel Awards	0	2
NAACP Image Awards	0	1
New York Film Critics Online	2	2
Online Film Critics Society	0	3
San Diego Film Critics Society	1	1
Satellite Awards	2	3
Screen Actors Guild Awards	1	1
St. Louis Film Critics Association	1	6
USC Scripter Awards	0	1
Vancouver Film Critics Circle	0	1
Venice Film Festival	1	1
Washington D.C. Area Film Critics Association	0	1
Women's Image Network Awards	1	1
World Soundtrack Awards	2	2
Writers Guild of America Awards	0	1

Totals (Note: Certain award groups do not simply award one winner. They acknowledge several different recipients, have runners-up, and have third place. Since this is a specific recognition and is different from losing an award, runner-up mentions are considered wins in this award tally. For simplification and to avoid errors, each award in this list has been presumed to have had a prior nomination.)
- Wins: 29
- Nominations: 78

The Constant Gardener is a 2005 British-German drama thriller film directed by Fernando Meirelles. The screenplay by Jeffrey Caine is based on John le Carré's 2001 novel of the same name. The story follows Justin Quayle (Ralph Fiennes), a British diplomat in Kenya, as he tries to solve the murder of his wife Tessa (Rachel Weisz), an Amnesty activist, alternating with many flashbacks telling the story of their love.

== Accolades ==
Award / Association / Film festival	Date of ceremony	Category	Recipient(s)	Result	Ref(s)
AARP Movies for Grownups Awards	7 February 2006	Best Director	Fernando Meirelles	Runner-up	
Academy Awards	5 March 2006	Best Supporting Actress	Rachel Weisz	Won	
Academy Awards	5 March 2006	Best Adapted Screenplay	Jeffrey Caine	Nominated	
Academy Awards	5 March 2006	Best Original Score	Alberto Iglesias	Nominated	
Academy Awards	5 March 2006	Best Film Editing	Claire Simpson	Nominated	
ACE Eddie Awards	19 February 2006	Best Edited Feature Film – Dramatic	Claire Simpson	Nominated	
African-American Film Critics Association	2005	Top Ten Films	The Constant Gardener	2nd place	
ALMA Awards	6 May 2006	Outstanding Director of a Motion Picture	Fernando Meirelles	Won	
Art Directors Guild Awards	11 February 2006	Excellence in Production Design for a Contemporary Film	Mark Tildesley	Nominated	
British Academy Film Awards	19 February 2006	Best Film	Simon Channing Williams	Nominated	
British Academy Film Awards	19 February 2006	Outstanding British Film	Simon Channing Williams, Fernando Meirelles, and Jeffrey Caine	Nominated	
British Academy Film Awards	19 February 2006	Best Director	Fernando Meirelles	Nominated	
British Academy Film Awards	19 February 2006	Best Actor in a Leading Role	Ralph Fiennes	Nominated	
British Academy Film Awards	19 February 2006	Best Actress in a Leading Role	Rachel Weisz	Nominated	
British Academy Film Awards	19 February 2006	Best Adapted Screenplay	Jeffrey Caine	Nominated	
British Academy Film Awards	19 February 2006	Best Cinematography	César Charlone	Nominated	
British Academy Film Awards	19 February 2006	Best Editing	Claire Simpson	Won	
British Academy Film Awards	19 February 2006	Best Original Music	Alberto Iglesias	Nominated	
British Academy Film Awards	19 February 2006	Best Sound	Joakim Sundström, Stuart Wilson, Mike Prestwood Smith, and Sven Taits	Nominated	
British Independent Film Awards	30 November 2005	Best British Independent Film	The Constant Gardener	Won	
British Independent Film Awards	30 November 2005	Best Director	Fernando Meirelles	Nominated	
British Independent Film Awards	30 November 2005	Best Actor	Ralph Fiennes	Won	
British Independent Film Awards	30 November 2005	Best Actress	Rachel Weisz	Won	
British Independent Film Awards	30 November 2005	Best Supporting Actor/Actress	Bill Nighy	Nominated	
British Independent Film Awards	30 November 2005	Best Screenplay	Jeffrey Caine	Nominated	
British Independent Film Awards	30 November 2005	Best Technical Achievement	César Charlone	Nominated	
British Society of Cinematographers Awards	8 December 2006	Best Cinematography in a Theatrical Feature Film	César Charlone	Nominated	
Cannes Film Festival	17–28 May 2006	Prix France Musique	Alberto Iglesias	Won	
Chicago Film Critics Association	9 January 2006	Best Supporting Actress	Rachel Weisz	Nominated	
Critics' Choice Awards	9 January 2006	Best Picture	The Constant Gardener	Nominated	
Critics' Choice Awards	9 January 2006	Best Supporting Actress	Rachel Weisz	Nominated	
Dallas–Fort Worth Film Critics Association	19 December 2005	Best Supporting Actress	Rachel Weisz	3rd Place	
Empire Awards	13 March 2006	Best Thriller	The Constant Gardener	Nominated	
European Film Awards	3 December 2005	Best Non-European Film	Fernando Meirelles	Nominated	
Evening Standard British Film Awards	30 January 2006	Best Film	The Constant Gardener	Won	
Evening Standard British Film Awards	30 January 2006	Best Actor	Ralph Fiennes	Won	
Golden Globe Awards	16 January 2006	Best Motion Picture – Drama	The Constant Gardener	Nominated	
Golden Globe Awards	16 January 2006	Best Director	Fernando Meirelles	Nominated	
Golden Globe Awards	16 January 2006	Best Supporting Actress	Rachel Weisz	Won	
Goya Awards	29 January 2006	Best European Film	The Constant Gardener	Nominated	
Grande Prêmio do Cinema Brasileiro	22 April 2007	Best Foreign-Language Film	The Constant Gardener	Won	
Imagen Awards	18 August 2006	Best Director	Fernando Meirelles	Nominated	
International Cinephile Society	2006	Best Picture	The Constant Gardener	8th place	
International Cinephile Society	2006	Best Cinematography	César Charlone	Runner-up	
London Film Critics' Circle	8 February 2006	Film of the Year	The Constant Gardener	Nominated	
London Film Critics' Circle	8 February 2006	British Film of the Year	The Constant Gardener	Won	
London Film Critics' Circle	8 February 2006	Director of the Year	Fernando Meirelles	Nominated	
London Film Critics' Circle	8 February 2006	British Actor of the Year	Ralph Fiennes	Won	
London Film Critics' Circle	8 February 2006	British Actress of the Year	Rachel Weisz	Won	
London Film Critics' Circle	8 February 2006	Screenwriter of the Year	Jeffrey Caine	Nominated	
London Film Critics' Circle	8 February 2006	British Producer of the Year	Simon Channing Williams	Won	
Motion Picture Sound Editors Golden Reel Awards	4 March 2006	Best Sound Editing in Foreign Feature – Sound Effects, Foley, Dialogue and ADR	Joakim Sundström, Nick Adams, Jennie Evans, Paul Wrightson, and Nicolas Becker	Nominated	
Motion Picture Sound Editors Golden Reel Awards	4 March 2006	Best Sound Editing in Feature Film – Music	Tony Lewis	Nominated	
NAACP Image Awards	25 February 2006	Outstanding Independent or Foreign Film	The Constant Gardener	Nominated	
New York Film Critics Online	11 December 2005	Top 9 Films	The Constant Gardener	Won	
New York Film Critics Online	11 December 2005	Best Director	Fernando Meirelles	Won	
Online Film Critics Society	16 January 2006	Best Supporting Actress	Rachel Weisz	Nominated	
Online Film Critics Society	16 January 2006	Best Adapted Screenplay	Jeffrey Caine	Nominated	
Online Film Critics Society	16 January 2006	Best Editing	Claire Simpson	Nominated	
San Diego Film Critics Society	19 December 2005	Best Supporting Actress	Rachel Weisz	Won	
Satellite Awards	17 December 2005	Outstanding Actor in a Supporting Role, Drama	Danny Huston	Won	
Satellite Awards	17 December 2005	Best Original Score	Alberto Iglesias	Nominated	
Satellite Awards	17 December 2005	Best Cinematography	César Charlone	Won	
Screen Actors Guild Awards	29 January 2006	Outstanding Performance by a Female Actor in a Supporting Role	Rachel Weisz	Won	
St. Louis Film Critics Association	8 January 2006	Best Picture	The Constant Gardener	Nominated	
St. Louis Film Critics Association	8 January 2006	Best Director	Fernando Meirelles	Nominated	
St. Louis Film Critics Association	8 January 2006	Best Screenplay	Jeffrey Caine	Nominated	
St. Louis Film Critics Association	8 January 2006	Best Actor	Ralph Fiennes	Nominated	
St. Louis Film Critics Association	8 January 2006	Best Supporting Actress	Rachel Weisz	Won	
St. Louis Film Critics Association	8 January 2006	Best Cinematography	César Charlone	Nominated	
USC Scripter Awards	11 February 2006	USC Scripter Award	Jeffrey Caine and John le Carré	Nominated	
Vancouver Film Critics Circle	7 February 2006	Best Supporting Actress	Rachel Weisz	Nominated	
Venice Film Festival	31 August – 10 September 2005	Young Cinema Award for Best International Film	Fernando Meirelles	Won	
Washington D.C. Area Film Critics Association	13 December 2005	Best Director	Fernando Meirelles	Nominated	
Women's Image Network Awards	1 November 2006	Outstanding Lead Actor in a Feature Film	Ralph Fiennes	Won	
World Soundtrack Awards	14 October 2006	Soundtrack Composer of the Year	Alberto Iglesias	Won	
World Soundtrack Awards	14 October 2006	Best Original Score of the Year	Alberto Iglesias	Won	
Writers Guild of America Awards	4 February 2006	Best Adapted Screenplay	Jeffrey Caine	Nominated	
