= List of accolades received by Nebraska (film) =

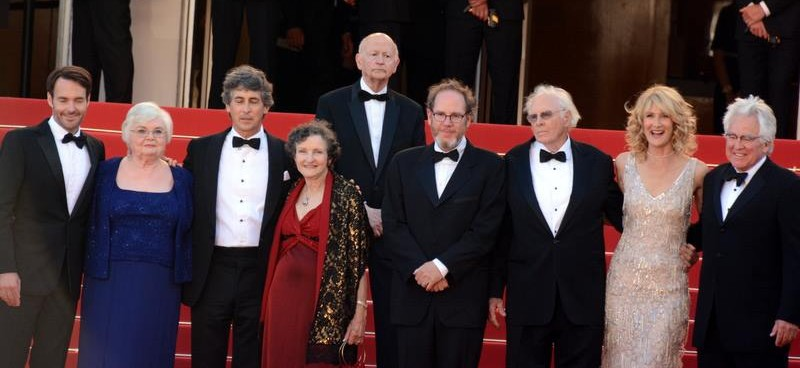
- The cast and crew of Nebraska at the 2013 Cannes Film Festival.
Awards & nominations
Award	Won	Nominated
AARP Annual Movies for Grownups Awards	2	2
Academy Awards	0	6
Alliance of Women Film Journalists	0	9
American Cinema Editors	0	1
American Comedy Awards	0	6
American Film Institute	1	1
American Society of Cinematographers	0	1
Boston Society of Film Critics	2	3
British Academy Film Awards	0	3
British Society of Cinematographers	1	1
Broadcast Film Critics Association	0	6
Cannes Film Festival	1	2
Chicago Film Critics Association	0	3
Costume Designers Guild Awards	0	1
Dallas–Fort Worth Film Critics Association	1	5
Detroit Film Critics Society	0	1
Dublin Film Critics Circle	1	3
Golden Frog	0	1
Golden Globe Awards	0	5
Guardian Film Awards	1	3
Hamburg Film Festival	0	1
Houston Film Critics Society	0	4
Independent Spirit Awards	1	6
International Film Festival Rotterdam	1	1
Location Managers Guild of America	0	2
London Film Critics' Circle	0	3
Los Angeles Film Critics Association	1	2
National Board of Review	3	3
National Society of Film Critics	0	1
New York Film Critics Online	0	1
New York Film Festival	0	1
Producers Guild of America Award	0	1
San Francisco Film Critics Circle	0	6
Santa Barbara International Film Festival	1	1
Satellite Awards	2	3
Screen Actors Guild Awards	0	2
Screenwriters' Choice Awards	0	1
St. Louis Film Critics Association	0	9
Stockholm International Film Festival	0	1
Tallinn Black Nights Film Festival	0	1
Toronto Film Critics Association	0	1
Vancouver Film Critics Circle	0	1
Washington D.C. Area Film Critics	0	1
Writers Guild of America Award	0	1
- Total number of wins and nominations
Totals	20	117
- References

Nebraska is a 2013 American black and white comedy-drama film directed by Alexander Payne and written by Bob Nelson. It follows two Montana residents (Bruce Dern and Will Forte), who take a road trip to Nebraska to claim a fortune. The film premiered at the Cannes Film Festival on August 28, 2013, where it competed for the Palme d'Or. It was released on November 15, 2013 in the United States. Nebraska has earned over $17 million at the box office.

The film gathered various awards and nominations following its release, ranging from recognition of the film itself to Nelson's screenplay, the direction and the cast's acting performances, particularly those of Dern and June Squibb. At the 86th Academy Awards, Nebraska received six nominations. The film earned nine nominations from the Alliance of Women Film Journalists. The American Film Institute included Nebraska on their annual Top Ten Films of the Year list. The film garnered 6 nominations at the 19th Critics' Choice Awards, while earning three nominations from the Boston Society of Film Critics, British Academy Film Awards and Chicago Film Critics Association. Cinematographer Phedon Papamichael was nominated for the Golden Frog award from the Camerimage. Nebraska received five nominations at the 71st Golden Globe Awards, including Best Director and Best Musical or Comedy Motion Picture.

At the 29th Independent Spirit Awards, Nebraska gathered six nominations in categories, including Best Feature and Best First Screenplay. Squibb was nominated for Best Supporting Actress at the Los Angeles Film Critics Association, where Dern won Best Actor. The National Board of Review awarded Dern and Forte the Best Actor and Best Supporting Actor accolades respectively. Nebraska was named one of the Top Ten Films. The San Francisco Film Critics Circle bestowed six nominations on the film. The film's cast received the award for Best Ensemble in a Motion Picture at the 18th Satellite Awards. Both Dern and Squibb were nominated in the Best Actor and Best Supporting Actress categories. They also earned nominations at the Screen Actors Guild Awards. Squibb was nominated for Best Supporting Actress in three other circles. Nebraska gathered nine nominations from the St. Louis Film Critics Association and won the FIPRESCI Award at the 2013 Stockholm International Film Festival. Most recently, the film was nominated for Best Original Screenplay by the Writers Guild of America.

== Awards and nominations ==
Award	Date of ceremony	Category	Recipients	Result
AARP Annual Movies for Grownups Awards	January 6, 2014	Best Actor	Bruce Dern	Won
AARP Annual Movies for Grownups Awards	January 6, 2014	Best Intergenerational Movie	Nebraska	Won
Academy Awards	March 2, 2014	Best Picture	Albert Berger and Ron Yerxa	Nominated
Academy Awards	March 2, 2014	Best Director	Alexander Payne	Nominated
Academy Awards	March 2, 2014	Best Actor	Bruce Dern	Nominated
Academy Awards	March 2, 2014	Best Supporting Actress	June Squibb	Nominated
Academy Awards	March 2, 2014	Best Original Screenplay	Bob Nelson	Nominated
Academy Awards	March 2, 2014	Best Cinematography	Phedon Papamichael	Nominated
Alliance of Women Film Journalists	December 19, 2013	Best Actor	Bruce Dern	Nominated
Alliance of Women Film Journalists	December 19, 2013	Best Actor in a Supporting Role	Will Forte	Nominated
Alliance of Women Film Journalists	December 19, 2013	Best Cinematography	Phedon Papamichael	Nominated
Alliance of Women Film Journalists	December 19, 2013	Best Director	Alexander Payne	Nominated
Alliance of Women Film Journalists	December 19, 2013	Best Ensemble Cast	Nebraska	Nominated
Alliance of Women Film Journalists	December 19, 2013	Best Film	Nebraska	Nominated
Alliance of Women Film Journalists	December 19, 2013	Best Music or Score	Mark Orton	Nominated
Alliance of Women Film Journalists	December 19, 2013	Best Original Screenplay	Bob Nelson	Nominated
Alliance of Women Film Journalists	December 19, 2013	Unforgettable Moment	"That's not my air compressor"	Nominated
American Cinema Editors	February 7, 2014	Best Edited Comedy or Musical Feature Film	Kevin Tent	Nominated
American Comedy Awards	May 15, 2014	Best Comedy Actor	Bruce Dern	Nominated
American Comedy Awards	May 15, 2014	Best Comedy Director	Alexander Payne	Nominated
American Comedy Awards	May 15, 2014	Best Comedy Screenplay	Bob Nelson	Nominated
American Comedy Awards	May 15, 2014	Best Comedy Supporting Actor	Will Forte	Nominated
American Comedy Awards	May 15, 2014	Best Comedy Supporting Actress	June Squibb	Nominated
American Comedy Awards	May 15, 2014	Funniest Motion Picture	Nebraska	Nominated
American Film Institute	December 9, 2013	Top Ten Films of the Year	Nebraska	Won
American Society of Cinematographers	February 1, 2014	Best Cinematography in Theatrical Releases	Phedon Papamichael	Nominated
Boston Society of Film Critics	December 8, 2013	Best Ensemble Cast	Nebraska	Won
Boston Society of Film Critics	December 8, 2013	Best Supporting Actress	June Squibb	Won
Boston Society of Film Critics	December 8, 2013	Best Use of Music in a Film	Nebraska	Nominated
British Academy Film Awards	February 16, 2014	Best Actor in a Leading Role	Bruce Dern	Nominated
British Academy Film Awards	February 16, 2014	Best Cinematography	Phedon Papamichael	Nominated
British Academy Film Awards	February 16, 2014	Best Original Screenplay	Bob Nelson	Nominated
British Society of Cinematographers	2014	Best Cinematography in a Theatrical Release	Phedon Papamichael	Won
Broadcast Film Critics Association	January 16, 2014	Best Actor	Bruce Dern	Nominated
Broadcast Film Critics Association	January 16, 2014	Best Cast	Nebraska	Nominated
Broadcast Film Critics Association	January 16, 2014	Best Cinematography	Phedon Papamichael	Nominated
Broadcast Film Critics Association	January 16, 2014	Best Film	Nebraska	Nominated
Broadcast Film Critics Association	January 16, 2014	Best Original Screenplay	Bob Nelson	Nominated
Broadcast Film Critics Association	January 16, 2014	Best Supporting Actress	June Squibb	Nominated
Cannes Film Festival	May 26, 2013	Best Actor	Bruce Dern	Won
Cannes Film Festival	May 26, 2013	Palme d'Or	Nebraska	Nominated
Chicago Film Critics Association	December 16, 2013	Best Actor	Bruce Dern	Nominated
Chicago Film Critics Association	December 16, 2013	Best Original Screenplay	Bob Nelson	Nominated
Chicago Film Critics Association	December 16, 2013	Best Supporting Actress	June Squibb	Nominated
Costume Designers Guild Awards	February 22, 2014	Excellence in Contemporary Film	Wendy Chuck	Nominated
Dallas–Fort Worth Film Critics Association	December 16, 2013	Best Actor	Bruce Dern	Nominated
Dallas–Fort Worth Film Critics Association	December 16, 2013	Best Director	Alexander Payne	Nominated
Dallas–Fort Worth Film Critics Association	December 16, 2013	Best Screenplay	Bob Nelson	Nominated
Dallas–Fort Worth Film Critics Association	December 16, 2013	Best Supporting Actress	June Squibb	Nominated
Dallas–Fort Worth Film Critics Association	December 16, 2013	Top Ten Films	Nebraska	Won
Detroit Film Critics Society	December 13, 2013	Best Supporting Actress	June Squibb	Nominated
Dublin Film Critics Circle	December 18, 2013	Best Actor	Bruce Dern	Won
Dublin Film Critics Circle	December 18, 2013	Best Cinematography	Phedon Papamichael	Nominated
Dublin Film Critics Circle	December 18, 2013	Best Screenplay	Bob Nelson	Nominated
Golden Frog	November 23, 2013	Best Cinematography	Phedon Papamichael	Nominated
Golden Globe Awards	January 12, 2014	Best Actor in a Musical or Comedy	Bruce Dern	Nominated
Golden Globe Awards	January 12, 2014	Best Director	Alexander Payne	Nominated
Golden Globe Awards	January 12, 2014	Best Musical or Comedy Motion Picture	Nebraska	Nominated
Golden Globe Awards	January 12, 2014	Best Screenplay	Bob Nelson	Nominated
Golden Globe Awards	January 12, 2014	Best Supporting Actress	June Squibb	Nominated
Guardian Film Awards	March 7, 2014	Best Actor	Bruce Dern	Nominated
Guardian Film Awards	March 7, 2014	Best Director	Alexander Payne	Nominated
Guardian Film Awards	March 7, 2014	Best Supporting Actor	June Squibb	Won
Hamburg Film Festival	October 5, 2013	Art Cinema Award	Alexander Payne	Nominated
Houston Film Critics Society	December 15, 2013	Best Actor	Bruce Dern	Nominated
Houston Film Critics Society	December 15, 2013	Best Director	Alexander Payne	Nominated
Houston Film Critics Society	December 15, 2013	Best Film	Nebraska	Nominated
Houston Film Critics Society	December 15, 2013	Best Supporting Actress	June Squibb	Nominated
Independent Spirit Awards	March 1, 2014	Best Director	Alexander Payne	Nominated
Independent Spirit Awards	March 1, 2014	Best Feature	Albert Berger and Ron Yerxa	Nominated
Independent Spirit Awards	March 1, 2014	Best First Screenplay	Bob Nelson	Won
Independent Spirit Awards	March 1, 2014	Best Male Lead	Bruce Dern	Nominated
Independent Spirit Awards	March 1, 2014	Best Supporting Female	June Squibb	Nominated
Independent Spirit Awards	March 1, 2014	Best Supporting Male	Will Forte	Nominated
International Film Festival Rotterdam	February 1, 2014	Audience Award	Nebraska	Won
Location Managers Guild of America	March 29, 2014	Outstanding Achievement by a Location Professional for a Feature Film	John Latenser V	Nominated
Location Managers Guild of America	March 29, 2014	Outstanding Location Feature Film	Nebraska	Nominated
London Film Critics' Circle	February 2, 2014	Actor of the Year	Bruce Dern	Nominated
London Film Critics' Circle	February 2, 2014	Film of the Year	Nebraska	Nominated
London Film Critics' Circle	February 2, 2014	Supporting Actress of the Year	June Squibb	Nominated
Los Angeles Film Critics Association	December 8, 2013	Best Actor	Bruce Dern	Won
Los Angeles Film Critics Association	December 8, 2013	Best Supporting Actress	June Squibb	Nominated
National Board of Review	December 4, 2013	Best Actor	Bruce Dern	Won
National Board of Review	December 4, 2013	Best Supporting Actor	Will Forte	Won
National Board of Review	December 4, 2013	Top Ten Films	Nebraska	Won
National Society of Film Critics	January 4, 2014	Best Cinematography	Phedon Papamichael	Nominated
New York Film Critics Online	December 8, 2013	Best Picture	Nebraska	Nominated
New York Film Festival	October 13, 2013	Grand Marnier Fellowship	Nebraska	Nominated
Producers Guild of America Award	January 19, 2014	Outstanding Producer of Theatrical Motion Pictures	Albert Berger and Ron Yerxa	Nominated
San Francisco Film Critics Circle	December 15, 2013	Best Actor	Bruce Dern	Nominated
San Francisco Film Critics Circle	December 15, 2013	Best Cinematography	Phedon Papamichael	Nominated
San Francisco Film Critics Circle	December 15, 2013	Best Film	Nebraska	Nominated
San Francisco Film Critics Circle	December 15, 2013	Best Original Screenplay	Bob Nelson	Nominated
San Francisco Film Critics Circle	December 15, 2013	Best Supporting Actor	Will Forte	Nominated
San Francisco Film Critics Circle	December 15, 2013	Best Supporting Actress	June Squibb	Nominated
Santa Barbara International Film Festival	February 4, 2014	Virtuosos Award	June Squibb	Won
Satellite Awards	February 23, 2014	Best Actor	Bruce Dern	Nominated
Satellite Awards	February 23, 2014	Best Cast	Nebraska	Won
Satellite Awards	February 23, 2014	Best Supporting Actress	June Squibb	Won
Screen Actors Guild Awards	January 18, 2014	Best Male Actor in a Leading Role	Bruce Dern	Nominated
Screen Actors Guild Awards	January 18, 2014	Best Female Actor in a Supporting Role	June Squibb	Nominated
Screenwriters' Choice Awards	January 7, 2014	Best Original Screenplay	Bob Nelson	Nominated
St. Louis Film Critics Association	December 14, 2013	Best Actor	Bruce Dern	Nominated
St. Louis Film Critics Association	December 14, 2013	Best Cinematography	Phedon Papamichael	Nominated
St. Louis Film Critics Association	December 14, 2013	Best Comedy	Nebraska	Nominated
St. Louis Film Critics Association	December 14, 2013	Best Director	Alexander Payne	Nominated
St. Louis Film Critics Association	December 14, 2013	Best Musical Score	Nebraska	Nominated
St. Louis Film Critics Association	December 14, 2013	Best Original Screenplay	Bob Nelson	Nominated
St. Louis Film Critics Association	December 14, 2013	Best Film	Nebraska	Nominated
St. Louis Film Critics Association	December 14, 2013	Best Supporting Actor	Will Forte	Nominated
St. Louis Film Critics Association	December 14, 2013	Best Supporting Actress	June Squibb	Nominated
Stockholm International Film Festival	November 17, 2013	FIPRESCI Award	Nebraska	Won
Tallinn Black Nights Film Festival	December 1, 2013	Audience Award	Nebraska	Nominated
Toronto Film Critics Association	December 17, 2013	Best Supporting Actress	June Squibb	Nominated
Vancouver Film Critics Circle	January 7, 2014	Best Supporting Actress	June Squibb	Nominated
Washington D.C. Area Film Critics Association	December 9, 2013	Best Supporting Actress	June Squibb	Nominated
Writers Guild of America Award	February 1, 2014	Best Original Screenplay	Bob Nelson	Nominated
