= St. Louis Film Critics Association =

Organization of film critics

The St. Louis Film Critics Association (StLFCA), formerly known as St. Louis Gateway Film Critics Association, is an organization of film critics who operate in or near Greater St. Louis. It was founded in 2004.

Each December, StLFCA members assemble to vote on their annual film awards, which include 19 StLFCA Awards and one Special Recognition Award for a best scene, cinematic technique, or other memorable aspect or moment in a film. The awards are noted by film critic associations and media outlets, particularly during award season.

== Rules ==
The St. Louis Film Critics Association have eight bylaws for the organization and 14 affiliated media outlets.

Its membership requirements: "Critics who are Full Members must produce reviews for a media outlet that is recognized by motion picture studios and local film public relations agencies representing the studios. The member's reviews must contain original critical commentary and illustrate a breadth of film knowledge. Reviews that include only plot summaries or information derived from press releases do not qualify.

"A critic must watch and review at least 26 current feature-length motion pictures within each calendar year (January 1 – December 31). Qualifying films are those that are: 1) given a wide or limited theatrical release, including those films given concurrent digital multi-platform releases; or 2) screened at a film festival. A qualifying review must be published or broadcast in a timely manner, i.e. within seven days of the film's local opening or screening date. Reviews of theatrically re-released films or home video releases (e.g., DVDs, Blu-rays, or online streaming) do not qualify.

"A qualifying standard review must be at least 300 words in length. Two capsule reviews of 100 to 299 words in length may be counted as one standard review. Two audio or video reviews may be counted as one standard review. Written reviews must be professionally edited and formatted, exhibit excellence in grammar and spelling, and accurate with respect to factual information. Reviews that are reprinted or rebroadcast in different formats or outlets, even with minor revisions, are not considered separately.

"Qualifying print outlets must have a minimum verifiable circulation of 20,000. Qualifying radio and television outlets must be those that broadcast from an FCC-licensed station (commercial or public) or a satellite / Internet radio station with a wide audience. Qualifying online outlets must be consistently updated, professional in appearance, and have a minimum of 5,000 unique visits per month. Podcasts do not qualify unless the audio reviews are originally broadcast on a qualifying radio or television outlet."

== Award categories ==
=== Current awards ===
- Best Film
- Best Director
- Best Actor
- Best Actress
- Best Supporting Actor
- Best Supporting Actress
- Best Ensemble
- Best Vocal Performance
- Best Adapted Screenplay
- Best Original Screenplay
- Best Editing
- Best Cinematography
- Best Production Design
- Best Costume Design
- Best Visual Effects
- Best Stunts
- Best Score
- Best Soundtrack
- Best Action Film
- Best Comedy Film
- Best Horror Film
- Best Animated Feature
- Best Documentary Feature
- Best International Film
- Best First Feature
- Best Scene

=== Retired awards ===
- Best Screenplay (2004–2009, split into Best Adapted and Best Original Screenplay)
- Best Art-House or Festival Film (2005–2014)
- Best Song (2015–2016)

== Awards ==
- 2004
- 2005
- 2006
- 2007
- 2008
- 2009
- 2010
- 2011
- 2012
- 2013
- 2014
- 2015
- 2016
- 2017
- 2018
- 2019
- 2020
- 2021
- 2022
- 2023
- 2024
- 2025

== Films with multiple awards ==
(2 awards and more)

- 9 awards:
  - Once Upon a Time in Hollywood (2019): Best Picture, Director, Supporting Actor, Supporting Actress, Original Screenplay, Soundtrack, Production Design, Editing, Special Merit
- 7 awards:
  - 12 Years a Slave (2013): Best Picture, Director, Actor, Supporting Actress, Adapted Screenplay, Cinematography, Scene
- 6 awards:
  - La La Land (2016): Best Picture, Director, Cinematography, Score, Song, Scene
- 5 awards:
  - Everything Everywhere All At Once (2022): Best Picture, Actress, Supporting Actor, Original Screenplay, Editing
  - The Artist (2011): Best Picture, Director, Music, Screenplay, Supporting Actress
- 4 awards:
  - The Aviator (2004): Best Picture, Director (Drama), Supporting Actress, Art Direction
  - Brokeback Mountain (2005): Best Picture, Director, Screenplay and Actor
  - Birdman or (The Unexpected Virtue of Ignorance) (2014): Best Director, Original Screenplay, Cinematography, Score
  - The Power of the Dog (2021): Best Director, Supporting Actor, Adapted Screenplay, Cinematography
- 3 awards:
  - Sideways (2004): Best Comedy/Musical, Screenplay, Director (Comedy/Musical)
  - Juno (2007): Best Actress, Screenplay, Comedy
  - Mass (2021): Best Original Screenplay, Supporting Actress, Ensemble
  - Licorice Pizza (2021): Best Film, Comedy Film, Scene
- 2 awards:
  - Ray (2004): Best Actor, Score
  - The Incredibles (2004): Best Animated Film, Visual Effects
  - House of Flying Daggers (2004): Best Cinematography, Art Direction
  - The Queen (2006): Best Actress, Screenplay
  - The Departed (2006): Best Picture, Director
  - The Diving Bell and the Butterfly (2007): Best Foreign Language Film, Most Original/Innovative Film
  - No Country for Old Men (2007): Best Picture, Director
  - The Dark Knight (2008): Best Supporting Actor, Best Visual/Special Effects
  - The Curious Case of Benjamin Button (2008): Best Picture, Most Original/Innovative Film
  - Slumdog Millionaire (2008): Best Director, Foreign Language Film
  - Up (2009): Best Animated Film, Favorite Scene
  - Nine (2009): Best Cinematography, Music
  - Up in the Air (2009): Best Picture, Actor
  - The Descendants (2011): Best Actor, Screenplay
  - The Girl with the Dragon Tattoo (2011): Best Actress, Favorite Scene
  - Guardians of the Galaxy (2014): Best Comedy, Soundtrack
  - Gone Girl (2014): Best Actress, Adapted Screenplay
  - Whiplash (2014): Best Art-House or Festival Film, Supporting Actor
  - Cruella (2021): Best Costume Design, Soundtrack
  - Dune (2021): Best Score, Visual Effects
  - The Banshees of Inisherin (2022): Best Supporting Actress, Original Screenplay
  - Elvis (2022): Best Costume Design, Production Design
  - Women Talking (2022): Best Director, Ensemble

== See also ==
- List of film awards
