= St. Louis Film Critics Association Award for Best Adapted Screenplay =

Annual US film award

The St. Louis Film Critics Association Award for Best Adapted Screenplay is an annual film award given by the St. Louis Film Critics Association since 2010. Together with the St. Louis Film Critics Association Award for Best Original Screenplay, it replaced the integrated St. Louis Film Critics Association Award for Best Screenplay (2004–2009).

== Winners ==
=== 2010s ===
Year	Winner	Writer(s)	Source
2010	The Social Network	Aaron Sorkin	The Accidental Billionaires by Ben Mezrich
2011	The Descendants	Alexander Payne, Nat Faxon, and Jim Rash	novel by Kaui Hart Hemmings
2012	Lincoln (tie)	Tony Kushner	Team of Rivals: The Political Genius of Abraham Lincoln by Doris Kearns Goodwin
2012	Silver Linings Playbook (tie)	David O. Russell	novel by Matthew Quick
2013	12 Years a Slave	John Ridley	memoir by Solomon Northup
2014	Gone Girl	Gillian Flynn	novel by Gillian Flynn
2015	The Martian	Drew Goddard	novel by Andy Weir
2016	Love & Friendship	Whit Stillman	Lady Susan by Jane Austen
2017	The Disaster Artist	Scott Neustadter and Michael H. Weber	book by Greg Sestero and Tom Bissell
2018	BlacKkKlansman	Spike Lee, David Rabinowitz, Charlie Wachtel, and Kevin Willmott	The memoir Black Klansman by Ron Stallworth
2019	The Irishman	Steven Zaillian	I Heard You Paint Houses by Charles Brandt

=== 2020s ===
Year	Winner	Writer(s)	Source
2020	I'm Thinking of Ending Things	Charlie Kaufman	novel by Iain Reid
2021	The Power of the Dog	Jane Campion	novel by Thomas Savage
2022	She Said	Rebecca Lenkiewicz	book by Jodi Kantor and Megan Twohey, and the New York Times investigation by Kantor, Twohey, and Rebecca Corbett
2023	Oppenheimer	Christopher Nolan	American Prometheus by Kai Bird and Martin J. Sherwin
2024	Conclave	Peter Straughan	novel by Robert Harris
2025	One Battle After Another	Paul Thomas Anderson	Vineland by Thomas Pynchon
