= St. Louis Film Critics Association Award for Best Original Screenplay =

Annual US film award

The St. Louis Film Critics Association Award for Best Original Screenplay is an annual film award given by the St. Louis Film Critics Association since 2010. Together with the St. Louis Film Critics Association Award for Best Adapted Screenplay, it replaced the integrated St. Louis Film Critics Association Award for Best Screenplay (2004–2009).

== Winners ==
=== 2010s ===
| Year | Winner | Writer(s) |
|---|---|---|
| 2010 | The King's Speech | David Seidler |
| 2011 | The Artist | Michel Hazanavicius |
| 2012 | Zero Dark Thirty | Mark Boal |
| 2013 | Her | Spike Jonze |
| 2014 | Birdman or (The Unexpected Virtue of Ignorance) | Alejandro G. Iñárritu, Nicolás Giacobone, Alexander Dinelaris Jr., and Armando Bo |
| 2015 | Spotlight | Tom McCarthy and Josh Singer |
| 2016 | Hell or High Water | Taylor Sheridan |
| 2017 | The Shape of Water | Guillermo del Toro and Vanessa Taylor |
| 2018 | Vice | Adam McKay |
| 2019 | Marriage Story | Noah Baumbach |

=== 2020s ===
| Year | Winner | Writer(s) |
|---|---|---|
| 2020 | Promising Young Woman | Emerald Fennell |
| 2021 | Mass | Fran Kranz |
| 2022 | The Banshees of Inisherin | Martin McDonagh |
| 2022 | Everything Everywhere All At Once | Daniel Kwan and Daniel Schienert |
| 2023 | Barbie | Greta Gerwig and Noah Baumbach |
| 2024 | Saturday Night | Gil Kenan and Jason Reitman |
| 2025 | Weapons | Zach Cregger |
