= St. Louis Film Critics Association Award for Best Screenplay =

Retired annual US film award

The St. Louis Film Critics Association Award for Best Screenplay is one of the annual film awards given by the St. Louis Film Critics Association. It was split into the Best Adapted Screenplay and Best Original Screenplay categories in 2010.

== Winners ==
Year	Winner	Writer(s)	Source
2004	Sideways	Alexander Payne and Jim Taylor	novel by Rex Pickett
2005	Brokeback Mountain	Diana Ossana and Larry McMurtry	short story by Annie Proulx
2006	The Queen	Peter Morgan	—
2007	Juno	Diablo Cody	—
2008	Frost/Nixon	Peter Morgan	play by Peter Morgan
2009	(500) Days of Summer	Scott Neustadter and Michael H. Weber	—
