= Jeffrey Caine =

British screenwriter

- Born: 1944 (age 80–81); London, England, UK
- Occupation(s): Screenwriter, novelist, actor
- Known for: GoldenEye; The Constant Gardener
- Family: two daughters and three grandchildren

Jeffrey Caine (born 1944) is a British screenwriter. He was nominated for the Academy Award for Best Adapted Screenplay in 2005 for The Constant Gardener.

He was educated at the University of Sussex and the University of Leeds.

== Filmography ==
=== Film ===
Year	Title	Director	Other notes
1995	GoldenEye	Martin Campbell	Co-writer with Bruce Feirstein, Michael France & Kevin Wade
2004	Inside I'm Dancing	Damien O'Donnell	
2005	The Constant Gardener	Fernando Meirelles	Nominated- Academy Award for Best Adapted Screenplay; Nominated- BAFTA Award for Best Adapted Screenplay; Nominated- BAFTA Award for Outstanding British Film; Nominated- British Independent Film Award for Best Screenplay; Nominated- Writers Guild of America Award for Best Adapted Screenplay; Nominated- USC Scripter Award; Nominated- London Film Critics' Circle Award for Screenwriter of the Year
2008	Purple Mountain	Simon West	Unfinished
2014	Time Out of Mind	Oren Moverman	
2014	Exodus: Gods and Kings	Ridley Scott	Co-writer with Adam Cooper, Bill Collage & Steven Zaillian
2019	The Song of Names	François Girard	

=== Television ===
Year	Title	Other notes
1986	Dempsey and Makepeace	2 episodes
1990–95	The Chief	Creator - 35 episodes Writer - 10 episodes
1996–97	Bodyguards	Creator - 7 episodes Writer - 2 episodes
1999	An Unsuitable Job for a Woman	Episode: "Playing God"

== See also ==
- List of Academy Award winners and nominees from Great Britain
