= 2005 St. Louis Film Critics Association Awards =

2005 film award

2nd SLGFCA Awards

January 8, 2006

Best Film:
Brokeback Mountain

Best Director:
Ang Lee
Brokeback Mountain

The 2nd St. Louis Gateway Film Critics Association Awards, retroactively known as the St. Louis Film Critics Association Awards, were given on January 8, 2006.

== Winners and nominees ==
=== Best Actor ===
Heath Ledger - Brokeback Mountain as Ennis del Mar

- Pierce Brosnan - The Matador
- Russell Crowe - Cinderella Man
- Ralph Fiennes - The Constant Gardener
- Philip Seymour Hoffman - Capote
- Cillian Murphy - Breakfast on Pluto
- Joaquin Phoenix - Walk the Line
- David Strathairn - Good Night, and Good Luck

=== Best Actress ===
Judi Dench - Mrs Henderson Presents as Mrs Henderson

- Claire Danes - Shopgirl
- Felicity Huffman - Transamerica
- Keira Knightley - Pride & Prejudice
- Laura Linney - The Squid and the Whale
- Gwyneth Paltrow - Proof
- Charlize Theron - North Country
- Reese Witherspoon - Walk the Line

=== Best Animated, Musical or Comedy Film ===
Wedding Crashers

- The 40-Year-Old Virgin
- Corpse Bride
- Madagascar
- The Matador
- The Producers
- Robots
- Wallace & Gromit: The Curse of the Were-Rabbit

=== Best Cinematography or Visual/Special Effects ===
King Kong

- Brokeback Mountain
- The Constant Gardener
- Good Night, and Good Luck
- Memoirs of a Geisha
- Pride & Prejudice
- Sin City
- War of the Worlds

=== Best Director ===
Ang Lee - Brokeback Mountain

- Woody Allen - Match Point
- George Clooney - Good Night, and Good Luck
- David Cronenberg - A History of Violence
- Peter Jackson - King Kong
- Fernando Meirelles - The Constant Gardener
- Frank Miller and Robert Rodriguez - Sin City
- Steven Spielberg - Munich

=== Best Documentary Feature ===
March of the Penguins

- The Aristocrats
- Born into Brothels
- Enron: The Smartest Guys in the Room
- Grizzly Man
- Mad Hot Ballroom
- Murderball
- The Wild Parrots of Telegraph Hill

=== Best Film ===
Brokeback Mountain

- Capote
- Cinderella Man
- The Constant Gardener
- Good Night, and Good Luck
- Match Point
- Mrs Henderson Presents
- Syriana

=== Best Foreign Language Film ===
Tsotsi • South Africa

- 2046 • China
- The Beautiful Country • Norway
- Downfall • Germany
- Kung Fu Hustle • China
- Oldboy • South Korea
- Paradise Now • Palestine
- Walk on Water • Israel

=== Best Overlooked Film or Most Original, Artistically Innovative or Creative Film ===
Sin City

- 2046
- The Dying Gaul
- Junebug
- Layer Cake
- Me and You and Everyone We Know
- Nobody Knows
- Thumbsucker

=== Best Screenplay ===
Brokeback Mountain - Larry McMurtry and Diana Ossana

- Breakfast on Pluto - Neil Jordan
- Capote - Dan Futterman
- The Constant Gardener - Jeffrey Caine
- Crash - Paul Haggis and Bobby Moresco
- Good Night, and Good Luck - George Clooney and Grant Heslov
- Match Point - Woody Allen
- Munich - Tony Kushner and Eric Roth

=== Best Supporting Actor ===
George Clooney - Syriana as Bob Barnes

- George Clooney - Good Night, and Good Luck
- Paul Giamatti - Cinderella Man
- Jake Gyllenhaal - Brokeback Mountain
- Bob Hoskins - Mrs Henderson Presents
- Greg Kinnear - The Matador
- Oliver Platt - Casanova
- Mickey Rourke - Sin City

=== Best Supporting Actress ===
Rachel Weisz - The Constant Gardener as Tessa Quayle

- Amy Adams - Junebug
- Catherine Keener - Capote
- Shirley MacLaine - In Her Shoes
- Frances McDormand - North Country
- Sharon Wilkins - Palindromes
- Michelle Williams - Brokeback Mountain
- Renée Zellweger - Cinderella Man
