= 2004 St. Louis Film Critics Association Awards =

Annual US film awards ceremony

1st SLGFCA Awards

February 10, 2005

Best Film:
The Aviator

Best Director - comedy/musical:
Alexander Payne
Sideways
Best Director - drama:
Martin Scorsese
The Aviator

The 1st St. Louis Gateway Film Critics Association Awards, retroactively known as the St. Louis Film Critics Association Awards, were announced on February 10, 2005. They were given for films opening before December 31, 2004.

== Winners ==
- Best Actor:
  - Jamie Foxx - Ray as Ray Charles
- Best Actress:
  - Hilary Swank - Million Dollar Baby as Maggie Fitzgerald
- Best Animated Film:
  - The Incredibles
- Best Art Direction: (tie)
  - Sky Captain and the World of Tomorrow
  - The Aviator
- Best Cinematography:
  - House of Flying Daggers as Zhao Xiaoding
- Best Comedy/Musical:
  - Sideways
- Best Director (Comedy/Musical):
  - Alexander Payne - Sideways
- Best Director (Drama):
  - Martin Scorsese - The Aviator
- Best Documentary Feature:
  - Fahrenheit 9/11
- Best Film:
  - The Aviator
- Best Foreign Language Film: (tie)
  - A Very Long Engagement (Un long dimanche de fiançailles) • France
  - The Motorcycle Diaries (Diarios de motocicleta) • Brazil
- Best Score:
  - Ray
- Best Screenplay:
  - Sideways - Alexander Payne and Jim Taylor
- Best Supporting Actor:
  - Thomas Haden Church - Sideways as Jack Lopate
- Best Supporting Actress:
  - Cate Blanchett - The Aviator as Katharine Hepburn
- Best Visual Effects: (tie)
  - The Incredibles
  - Sky Captain and the World of Tomorrow
