= 2018 St. Louis Film Critics Association Awards =

Annual US film awards ceremony

15th StLFCA Awards
December 16, 2018

Best Film:
A Star Is Born

Best Director:
Spike Lee
BlacKkKlansman

The nominees for the 15th St. Louis Film Critics Association Awards were announced on December 9, 2018. The winners were announced on December 16, 2018.

== Winners and nominees ==
=== Best Film ===
- A Star Is Born
- BlacKkKlansman
- First Reformed
- Roma
- Vice

=== Best Actor ===
- Ethan Hawke - First Reformed
- Christian Bale - Vice
- Bradley Cooper - A Star Is Born
- Willem Dafoe - At Eternity's Gate
- Rami Malek - Bohemian Rhapsody

=== Best Supporting Actor ===
- Richard E. Grant - Can You Ever Forgive Me?
- Mahershala Ali - Green Book
- Steve Carell - Vice
- Timothée Chalamet - Beautiful Boy
- Michael B. Jordan - Black Panther

=== Best Original Screenplay ===
- Vice - Adam McKay
- Eighth Grade - Bo Burnham
- The Favourite - Deborah Davis and Tony McNamara
- First Reformed - Paul Schrader
- A Quiet Place - Scott Beck & Bryan Woods and John Krasinski

=== Best Cinematography ===
- Roma - Alfonso Cuarón
- The Favourite - Robbie Ryan
- First Man - Linus Sandgren
- Green Book - Sean Porter
- If Beale Street Could Talk - James Laxton
- A Star Is Born - Matthew Libatique

=== Best Editing ===
- Vice - Hank Corwin
- First Man - Tom Cross
- Roma - Alfonso Cuarón and Adam Gough
- A Star Is Born - Jay Cassidy
- Widows - Joe Walker

=== Best Production Design ===
- Black Panther - Hannah Beachler
- The Favourite - Fiona Crombie
- First Man - Nathan Crowley
- If Beale Street Could Talk - Mark Friedberg
- Roma - Eugenio Caballero

=== Best Foreign Language Film ===
- Roma
- Capernaum
- The Captain
- The Guilty
- Shoplifters

=== Best Animated Feature ===
- Spider-Man: Into the Spider-Verse
- Hotel Transylvania 3: Summer Vacation
- Incredibles 2
- Isle of Dogs
- Ralph Breaks the Internet
- Early Man

=== Best Action Film ===
- Mission: Impossible – Fallout
- Ant-Man and the Wasp
- Avengers: Infinity War
- Black Panther
- Ready Player One
- Skyscraper

=== Best Director ===
- Spike Lee - BlacKkKlansman
- Bradley Cooper - A Star Is Born
- Alfonso Cuarón - Roma
- Yorgos Lanthimos - The Favourite
- Adam McKay - Vice

=== Best Actress ===
- Toni Collette - Hereditary
- Glenn Close - The Wife
- Olivia Colman - The Favourite
- Lady Gaga - A Star Is Born
- Charlize Theron - Tully

=== Best Supporting Actress ===
- Regina King - If Beale Street Could Talk
- Amy Adams - Vice
- Emily Blunt - A Quiet Place
- Emma Stone - The Favourite
- Rachel Weisz - The Favourite

=== Best Adapted Screenplay ===
- BlacKkKlansman - Charlie Wachtel & David Rabinowitz and Kevin Willmott & Spike Lee (Screenplay); Ron Stallworth (Book)
- Can You Ever Forgive Me? - Nicole Holofcener and Jeff Whitty (Screenplay); Lee Israel (Novel)
- If Beale Street Could Talk - Barry Jenkins (Screenplay); James Baldwin (Novel)
- A Star Is Born - Eric Roth and Bradley Cooper & Will Fetters (Screenplay); Moss Hart (1954 Screenplay); John Gregory Dunne, Joan Didion, and Frank Pierson (1976 Screenplay); William A. Wellman and Robert Carson (Story)
- Widows - Gillian Flynn and Steve McQueen (Screenplay); Lynda La Plante (Teleplay)

=== Best Visual Effects ===
- Avengers: Infinity War
- Annihilation
- Black Panther
- Ready Player One
- Solo: A Star Wars Story

=== Best Music Score ===
- BlacKkKlansman - Terence Blanchard
- Annihilation - Geoff Barrow and Ben Salisbury
- The Ballad of Buster Scruggs - Carter Burwell
- First Man - Justin Hurwitz
- If Beale Street Could Talk - Nicholas Britell

=== Best Soundtrack ===
- Bohemian Rhapsody
- BlacKkKlansman
- The Hate U Give
- Ready Player One
- A Star Is Born

=== Best Documentary Feature ===
- Won't You Be My Neighbor?
- Free Solo
- RBG
- Science Fair
- Three Identical Strangers

=== Best Comedy Film ===
- The Favourite
- Deadpool 2
- Game Night
- Paddington 2
- Sorry to Bother You

=== Best Scene ===
- Roma - Beach rescue.
- Avengers: Infinity War - Thor arrives in Wakanda.
- BlacKkKlansman - Final montage.
- Bohemian Rhapsody - Live Aid.
- Vice - Ending.

== Multiple nominations and awards ==
These films had multiple nominations:

- 8 nominations: The Favourite, A Star Is Born, Vice
- 7 nominations: Roma
- 6 nominations: BlacKkKlansman
- 5 nominations: If Beale Street Could Talk
- 4 nominations: Black Panther, First Man
- 3 nominations: Avengers: Infinity War, Bohemian Rhapsody, First Reformed, Ready Player One
- 2 nominations: Annihilation, Can You Ever Forgive Me?, Green Book, A Quiet Place, Widows

These films had multiple wins:

- 3 wins: BlacKkKlansman, Roma
- 2 wins: Vice
