= 2006 St. Louis Film Critics Association Awards =

Third annual awards event

3rd SLGFCA Awards

January 7, 2007

Best Film:
The Departed

Best Directors:
Martin Scorsese
The Departed

The 3rd St. Louis Gateway Film Critics Association Awards, retroactively known as the St. Louis Film Critics Association Awards, were given on January 7, 2007.

== Top Films of 2006 ==
(in alphabetical order)

- Blood Diamond
- The Departed
- Dreamgirls
- Flags of Our Fathers
- The Good Shepherd
- The Last King of Scotland
- Notes on a Scandal
- The Queen
- United 93

== Winners & Nominees ==
=== Best Actor ===
Forest Whitaker - The Last King of Scotland as Idi Amin

- Leonardo DiCaprio - Blood Diamond
- Leonardo DiCaprio - The Departed
- Matt Damon - The Good Shepherd
- Aaron Eckhart - Thank You for Smoking
- Ryan Gosling - Half Nelson
- Edward Norton - The Painted Veil
- Will Smith - The Pursuit of Happyness

=== Best Actress ===
Helen Mirren - The Queen as Queen Elizabeth II

- Annette Bening - Running with Scissors
- Juliette Binoche - Breaking and Entering
- Judi Dench - Notes on a Scandal
- Kate Winslet - Little Children

=== Best Animated or Children's Film ===
Cars

- Charlotte's Web
- Happy Feet
- Monster House
- Over the Hedge

=== Best Cinematography ===
The Painted Veil

- Babel
- Blood Diamond
- The Departed
- Flags of Our Fathers
- Hollywoodland
- Letters from Iwo Jima

=== Best Director ===
Martin Scorsese - The Departed

- Bill Condon - Dreamgirls
- Robert De Niro - The Good Shepherd
- Clint Eastwood - Flags of Our Fathers
- Clint Eastwood - Letters from Iwo Jima
- Stephen Frears - The Queen
- Paul Greengrass - United 93
- Edward Zwick - Blood Diamond

=== Best Documentary ===
An Inconvenient Truth

- Deliver Us from Evil
- The Heart of the Game
- Iraq for Sale
- Why We Fight

=== Best Foreign Language Film ===
El laberinto del fauno (Pan's Labyrinth) • Mexico/Spain/United States

- Apocalypto
- Das Leben der Anderen (The Lives of Others)
- Sorstalanság (Fateless)
- Volver (To Return)
- Zui hao de shi guang (Three Times)

=== Best Overlooked Film ===
Running with Scissors

- Brick
- Brothers of the Head
- Kekexili: Mountain Patrol
- Keeping Up with the Steins
- Deliver Us from Evil
- Lonesome Jim

=== Best Picture ===
The Departed

- Blood Diamond
- Dreamgirls
- Flags of Our Fathers
- The Good Shepherd
- The Last King of Scotland
- Notes on a Scandal
- The Queen
- United 93

=== Best Screenplay ===
The Queen - Peter Morgan

- Bobby - Emilio Estevez
- The Departed - William Monahan
- Little Children - Todd Field
- Little Miss Sunshine - Michael Arndt
- Notes on a Scandal - Patrick Marber
- Thank You for Smoking - Jason Reitman

=== Best Supporting Actor ===
Djimon Hounsou - Blood Diamond as Solomon Vandy

- Ben Affleck - Hollywoodland
- Adam Beach - Flags of Our Fathers
- Steve Carell - Little Miss Sunshine
- Chalo Gonzales - Quinceañera
- Eddie Murphy - Dreamgirls
- Jack Nicholson - The Departed

=== Best Supporting Actress ===
Jennifer Hudson - Dreamgirls as Effie White

- Cate Blanchett - Notes on a Scandal
- Abigail Breslin - Little Miss Sunshine
- Jill Clayburgh - Running with Scissors
- Shareeka Epps - Half Nelson
- Rinko Kikuchi - Babel
- Meryl Streep - The Devil Wears Prada
- Lili Taylor - Factotum

=== Best Visual/Special Effects ===
Pirates of the Caribbean: Dead Man's Chest

- The Fountain
- El laberinto del fauno (Pan's Labyrinth)
- V for Vendetta
- Superman Returns
- District B-13

=== Most Original, Innovative or Creative Film ===
United 93

- The Science of Sleep
- Little Miss Sunshine
- Brick
- Little Children
- Zen Noir
- El laberinto del fauno (Pan's Labyrinth)
