= 2007 St. Louis Film Critics Association Awards =

Annual US film awards ceremony

4th SLGFCA Awards

December 21, 2007

Best Film:
No Country for Old Men

Best Director:
Ethan Coen and Joel Coen
No Country for Old Men

The 4th St. Louis Gateway Film Critics Association Awards, retroactively known as the St. Louis Film Critics Association Awards, were announced on December 21, 2007.

== Winners and nominees ==
=== Best Actor ===
Daniel Day-Lewis – There Will Be Blood as Daniel Plainview

- Don Cheadle – Talk to Me as Ralph "Petey" Greene
- George Clooney – Michael Clayton as Michael Clayton
- Ryan Gosling – Lars and the Real Girl as Lars Lindstrom
- Tommy Lee Jones – In the Valley of Elah as Hank Deerfield
- Viggo Mortensen – Eastern Promises as Nikolai Luzhin

=== Best Actress ===
Elliot Page (Note: Credited as Ellen Page) – Juno as Juno MacGuff

- Cate Blanchett – Elizabeth: The Golden Age as Elizabeth I
- Julie Christie – Away from Her as Fiona Anderson
- Marion Cotillard – La Vie en Rose as Édith Piaf
- Jodie Foster – The Brave One as Erica Bain
- Laura Linney – The Savages as Wendy Savage

=== Best Animated or Children's Film ===
Ratatouille

- Bridge to Terabithia
- Enchanted
- The Golden Compass
- Persepolis
- The Simpsons Movie

=== Best Cinematography ===
The Assassination of Jesse James by the Coward Robert Ford – Roger Deakins

- Atonement – Seamus McGarvey
- The Diving Bell and the Butterfly (Le scaphandre et le papillon) – Janusz Kamiński
- Into the Wild – Éric Gautier
- The Kite Runner – Roberto Schaefer
- No Country for Old Men – Roger Deakins
- There Will Be Blood – Robert Elswit

=== Best Director ===
Ethan Coen and Joel Coen – No Country for Old Men

- Paul Thomas Anderson – There Will Be Blood
- Tim Burton – Sweeney Todd
- Mike Nichols – Charlie Wilson's War
- Sean Penn – Into the Wild
- Julian Schnabel – The Diving Bell and the Butterfly (Le scaphandre et le papillon)

=== Best Documentary Film ===
Sicko

- In the Shadow of the Moon
- The King of Kong: A Fistful of Quarters
- Manufactured Landscapes
- No End in Sight

=== Best Film ===
No Country for Old Men

- The Assassination of Jesse James by the Coward Robert Ford
- Atonement
- The Diving Bell and the Butterfly (Le scaphandre et le papillon)
- Into the Wild
- Juno
- The Kite Runner
- Michael Clayton
- Sweeney Todd
- There Will Be Blood

=== Best Film – Musical or Comedy ===
Juno

- Knocked Up
- Lars and the Real Girl
- The Simpsons Movie
- Superbad
- Waitress
- Walk Hard: The Dewey Cox Story

=== Best Foreign Language Film ===
The Diving Bell and the Butterfly (Le scaphandre et le papillon) • France/United States

- The Host • South Korea
- The Kite Runner • Afghanistan/United States
- La Vie en Rose • France
- Lust, Caution • China/Hong Kong/Taiwan
- Persepolis • France

=== Best Score ===
Sweeney Todd – Stephen Sondheim

- The Assassination of Jesse James by the Coward Robert Ford – Nick Cave and Warren Ellis
- Atonement – Dario Marianelli
- Juno – Mateo Messina
- La Vie en Rose – Christopher Gunning
- Once – Glen Hansard and Markéta Irglová
- There Will Be Blood – Jonny Greenwood

=== Best Screenplay ===
Juno – Diablo Cody

- Atonement – Ian McEwan and Christopher Hampton
- Into the Wild – Sean Penn and Jon Krakauer
- Lars and the Real Girl – Nancy Oliver
- Michael Clayton – Tony Gilroy
- No Country for Old Men – Ethan Coen and Joel Coen
- Persepolis – Vincent Paronnaud and Marjane Satrapi

=== Best Supporting Actor ===
Casey Affleck – The Assassination of Jesse James by the Coward Robert Ford as Robert Ford

- Javier Bardem – No Country for Old Men as Anton Chigurh
- Josh Brolin – No Country for Old Men as Llewelyn Moss
- Philip Seymour Hoffman – Charlie Wilson's War as Gust Avrakotos
- Tommy Lee Jones – No Country for Old Men as Ed Tom Bell
- Michael Sheen – Music Within as Art Honeyman
- Tom Wilkinson – Michael Clayton as Arthur Edens

=== Best Supporting Actress ===
Amy Ryan – Gone Baby Gone as Helene McCready

- Cate Blanchett – I'm Not There as Jude Quinn
- Katherine Heigl – Knocked Up as Allison Scott
- Taraji P. Henson – Talk to Me as Vernell Watson
- Saoirse Ronan – Atonement as Briony Tallis (age 13)
- Tilda Swinton – Michael Clayton as Karen Crowder

=== Best Visual/Special Effects ===
300

- The Golden Compass
- Harry Potter and the Order of the Phoenix
- I Am Legend
- Stardust
- Sweeney Todd

=== Most Original, Innovative or Creative Film ===
I'm Not There

- Across the Universe
- The Diving Bell and the Butterfly (Le scaphandre et le papillon)
- Into Great Silence
- Juno
- Persepolis

=== Worst Film of the Year ===
The Brothers Solomon
