= 2011 St. Louis Film Critics Association Awards =

Annual US film awards ceremony

8th StLFCA Awards

December 12, 2011

Best Film:
The Artist

Best Director:
Michel Hazanavicius
The Artist

The nominees for the 8th St. Louis Film Critics Association Awards were announced on December 12, 2011.

== Winners and nominees ==
=== Best Actor ===
George Clooney – The Descendants as Matt King

- Jean Dujardin – The Artist as George Valentin
- Michael Fassbender – Shame as Brandon Sullivan
- Ryan Gosling – Drive as The Driver (Runner-up)
- Gary Oldman – Tinker Tailor Soldier Spy as George Smiley
- Brad Pitt – Moneyball as Billy Beane

=== Best Actress ===
Rooney Mara – The Girl with the Dragon Tattoo as Lisbeth Salander

- Viola Davis – The Help as Aibileen Clarke
- Elizabeth Olsen – Martha Marcy May Marlene as Martha
- Saoirse Ronan – Hanna as Hanna
- Meryl Streep – The Iron Lady as Margaret Thatcher (Runners-up)
- Michelle Williams – My Week with Marilyn as Marilyn Monroe (Runners-up)

=== Best Animated Film ===
The Adventures of Tintin

- Kung Fu Panda 2
- Puss in Boots
- Rango (Runner-up)
- Rio

=== Best Cinematography ===
- The Artist – Guillaume Schiffman
- Drive – Newton Thomas Sigel
- The Girl with the Dragon Tattoo – Jeff Cronenweth (Runners-up)

The Tree of Life – Emmanuel Lubezki

- War Horse – Janusz Kamiński (Runners-up)

=== Best Director ===
Michel Hazanavicius – The Artist

- David Fincher – The Girl with the Dragon Tattoo
- Terrence Malick – The Tree of Life (Runner-up)
- Alexander Payne – The Descendants
- Nicolas Winding Refn – Drive

=== Best Documentary Film ===
Being Elmo: A Puppeteer's Journey

- Buck
- Conan O'Brien Can't Stop
- The Interrupters
- Tabloid (Runner-up)

=== Best Film ===
The Artist

- The Descendants (Runner-up)
- Drive
- My Week with Marilyn
- The Tree of Life

=== Best Comedy ===
Bridesmaids

- Crazy, Stupid, Love
- Midnight in Paris (Runner-up)
- The Muppets
- Paul
- Rango

=== Best Foreign Language Film ===
13 Assassins (Jūsannin no Shikaku) • Japan

- I Saw the Devil (Akmareul boattda) • South Korea
- Point Blank (À bout portant) • France
- Trollhunter (Trolljegeren) • Norway
- Winter in Wartime (Oorlogswinter) • Netherlands (Runner-up)

=== Best Music ===
The Artist

- Drive (Runner-up)
- The Girl with the Dragon Tattoo
- The Muppets
- The Tree of Life

=== Best Original Screenplay ===
The Artist – Michel Hazanavicius

- 50/50 – Will Reiser (Runner-up)
- Hanna – Seth Lochhead and David Farr
- Midnight in Paris – Woody Allen
- The Tree of Life – Terrence Malick
- Win Win – Tom McCarthy and Joe Tiboni

=== Best Adapted Screenplay ===
The Descendants – Nat Faxon, Jim Rash and Alexander Payne

- Drive – Hossein Amini
- The Help – Tate Taylor
- Moneyball – Steven Zaillian and Aaron Sorkin (Runner-up)
- The Muppets – Jason Segel and Nicholas Stoller

=== Best Supporting Actor ===
Albert Brooks – Drive as Bernie Rose

- John Goodman – The Artist as Al Zimmer
- John Hawkes – Martha Marcy May Marlene as Patrick
- Jonah Hill – Moneyball as Peter Brand
- Alan Rickman – Harry Potter and the Deathly Hallows – Part 2 as Severus Snape (Runner-up)

=== Best Supporting Actress ===
Bérénice Bejo – The Artist as Peppy Miller

- Cate Blanchett – Hanna as Marissa
- Jessica Chastain – The Tree of Life as Mrs. O'Brien
- Octavia Spencer – The Help as Minny Jackson (Runners-up)
- Shailene Woodley – The Descendants as Alexandra King (Runners-up)

=== Best Visual Effects ===
- Captain America: The First Avenger

Harry Potter and the Deathly Hallows – Part 2

- Rise of the Planet of the Apes (Runner-up)
- Super 8
- The Tree of Life

=== Best Art-House or Festival Film ===
- Beginners
- Martha Marcy May Marlene
- Tucker & Dale vs. Evil

We Need to Talk About Kevin

- Win Win (Runner-up)

=== Best Scene (favorite movie scene or sequence) ===
- The Artist: dance scene finale (Runner-up)
- Drive: the elevator beating scene
- Drive: opening get-away scene

The Girl with the Dragon Tattoo: opening credits

- Hanna: Hanna’s escape from captivity sequence
- Melancholia: the last scene
