= 2009 St. Louis Film Critics Association Awards =

Film Critics Association Awards 2009

6th SLGFCA Awards

December 21, 2009

Best Film:
Up in the Air

Best Director:
Kathryn Bigelow
The Hurt Locker

The 6th St. Louis Film Critics Association Awards were announced on 15 December and awarded on December 21, 2009.

== Winners and nominees ==
=== Best Actor ===
- George Clooney – Up in the Air
- Jeff Bridges – Crazy Heart
- Ben Foster – The Messenger
- Morgan Freeman – Invictus
- Patton Oswalt – Big Fan
- Jeremy Renner – The Hurt Locker

=== Best Actress ===
- Carey Mulligan – An Education
- Saoirse Ronan – The Lovely Bones
- Maya Rudolph – Away We Go
- Gabourey Sidibe – Precious
- Meryl Streep – Julie and Julia

=== Best Animated Film ===
- Up
- Coraline
- The Fantastic Mr. Fox
- Ponyo
- The Princess and the Frog

=== Best Cinematography ===
- Nine – Dion Beebe
- The Hurt Locker – Barry Ackroyd
- Inglourious Basterds – Robert Richardson
- Red Cliff (Chi bi) – Lü Yue and Zhang Li
- A Single Man – Eduard Grau
- Where the Wild Things Are – Lance Acord

=== Best Director ===
- Kathryn Bigelow – The Hurt Locker
- Wes Anderson – The Fantastic Mr. Fox
- Oren Moverman – The Messenger
- Jason Reitman – Up in the Air
- Quentin Tarantino – Inglourious Basterds

=== Best Documentary Film ===
- Capitalism: A Love Story
- Anvil! The Story of Anvil
- Food, Inc.
- Good Hair
- Tyson

=== Best Film ===
- Up in the Air
- (500) Days of Summer
- An Education
- The Hurt Locker
- Invictus
- Precious
- Up

=== Best Comedy ===
- The Hangover
- (500) Days of Summer
- Away We Go
- Pirate Radio
- Zombieland

=== Best Foreign Language Film ===
- Red Cliff (Chi bi) • China
- The Baader Meinhof Complex (Der Baader Meinhof Komplex) • Germany
- Coco Before Chanel (Coco avant Chanel) • France
- The Maid (La nana) • Chile
- Treeless Mountain • South Korea
- Without Name (Sin nombre) • Spain

=== Best Music ===
- Nine
- Crazy Heart
- Pirate Radio
- The Princess and the Frog
- Up

=== Best Screenplay ===
- (500) Days of Summer – Scott Neustadter and Michael H. Weber
- An Education – Nick Hornby
- The Hurt Locker – Mark Boal
- Inglourious Basterds – Quentin Tarantino
- Up in the Air – Jason Reitman and Sheldon Turner

=== Best Supporting Actor ===
- Christoph Waltz – Inglourious Basterds
- Robert Duvall – The Road
- Woody Harrelson – The Messenger
- Alfred Molina – An Education
- Stanley Tucci – The Lovely Bones

=== Best Supporting Actress ===
- Mo'Nique – Precious
- Marion Cotillard – Nine
- Vera Farmiga – Up in the Air
- Anna Kendrick – Up in the Air
- Mélanie Laurent – Inglourious Basterds
- Samantha Morton – The Messenger

=== Best Visual Effects ===
- Avatar
- District 9
- The Lovely Bones
- Star Trek
- Where the Wild Things Are

=== Most Original, Innovative or Creative Film ===
- Avatar
- (500) Days of Summer
- District 9
- The Fantastic Mr. Fox
- The Lovely Bones

=== Favorite Scene ===
- Up – "Opening marriage montage"
- (500) Days of Summer – "'Expectations vs. reality' split-screen sequence"
- (500) Days of Summer – "'Morning after' dance number"
- Inglourious Basterds – "The opening farmhouse scene"
- Precious – "Mo'Nique's scene at social worker office"
