= 2012 St. Louis Film Critics Association Awards =

Annual US film awards ceremony

9th StLFCA Awards

December 17, 2012

Best Film:
Argo

Best Director:
Ben Affleck
Argo

The nominees for the 9th St. Louis Film Critics Association Awards were announced on December 11, 2012. The winners were announced on December 17, 2012.

== Winners, runners-up and nominees ==
=== Best Actor ===
- Daniel Day-Lewis – Lincoln
  - Runner-up: John Hawkes – The Sessions
    - Bradley Cooper – Silver Linings Playbook
    - Jamie Foxx – Django Unchained
    - Joaquin Phoenix – The Master
    - Denzel Washington – Flight

=== Best Actress ===
- Jessica Chastain – Zero Dark Thirty
  - Runner-up: Jennifer Lawrence – Silver Linings Playbook
    - Helen Mirren – Hitchcock
    - Aubrey Plaza – Safety Not Guaranteed
    - Quvenzhané Wallis – Beasts of the Southern Wild

=== Best Adapted Screenplay ===
- Lincoln – Tony Kushner (TIE)
- Silver Linings Playbook – David O. Russell (TIE)
  - Argo – Chris Terrio
  - Beasts of the Southern Wild – Lucy Alibar and Benh Zeitlin
  - Life of Pi – David Magee
  - The Perks of Being a Wallflower – Stephen Chbosky

=== Best Animated Film ===
- Wreck-It Ralph
  - Runner-up: ParaNorman
    - Brave
    - Frankenweenie
    - Rise of the Guardians

=== Best Cinematography ===
- Skyfall – Roger Deakins
  - Runner-up: Life of Pi – Claudio Miranda
    - Beasts of the Southern Wild – Ben Richardson
    - Cloud Atlas – Frank Griebe and John Toll
    - Django Unchained – Robert Richardson
    - The Master – Mihai Mălaimare Jr.

=== Best Comedy Film ===
- Moonrise Kingdom (TIE)
- Ted (TIE)
  - The Cabin in the Woods
  - Seven Psychopaths
  - Wreck-It Ralph

=== Best Director ===
- Ben Affleck – Argo
  - Runner-up: Quentin Tarantino – Django Unchained (TIE)
  - Runner-up: Benh Zeitlin – Beasts of the Southern Wild (TIE)
    - Wes Anderson – Moonrise Kingdom
    - Kathryn Bigelow – Zero Dark Thirty
    - Ang Lee – Life of Pi

=== Best Documentary Film ===
- Searching for Sugar Man
  - Runner-up: Ai Weiwei: Never Sorry (TIE)
  - Runner-up: Bully (TIE)
  - Runner-up: How to Survive a Plague (TIE)
    - Jiro Dreams of Sushi

=== Best Film ===
- Argo
  - Runner-up: Life of Pi (TIE)
  - Runner-up: Lincoln (TIE)
    - Django Unchained
    - Moonrise Kingdom
    - Zero Dark Thirty

=== Best Foreign Language Film ===
- The Intouchables (Intouchables) • France
  - Runner-up: The Fairy (La fée) • Belgium / France (TIE)
  - Runner-up: Headhunters (Hodejegerne) • Norway (TIE)
    - Holy Motors • France / Germany
    - The Kid with a Bike (Le gamin au vélo) • Belgium / France / Italy

=== Best Music ===
- Django Unchained (TIE)
- Moonrise Kingdom (TIE)
  - Beasts of the Southern Wild
  - Cloud Atlas
  - The Dark Knight Rises
  - Not Fade Away

=== Best Original Screenplay ===
- Zero Dark Thirty – Mark Boal
  - Runner-up: Django Unchained – Quentin Tarantino
    - The Cabin in the Woods – Joss Whedon and Drew Goddard
    - Moonrise Kingdom – Wes Anderson and Roman Coppola
    - Seven Psychopaths – Martin McDonagh

=== Best Supporting Actor ===
- Christoph Waltz – Django Unchained
  - Runner-up: Tommy Lee Jones – Lincoln
    - Alan Arkin – Argo
    - John Goodman – Argo
    - William H. Macy – The Sessions
    - Bruce Willis – Moonrise Kingdom

=== Best Supporting Actress ===
- Ann Dowd – Compliance (TIE)
- Helen Hunt – The Sessions (TIE)
  - Amy Adams – The Master
  - Sally Field – Lincoln
  - Anne Hathaway – Les Misérables
  - Emma Watson – The Perks of Being a Wallflower

=== Best Visual Effects ===
- Bill Westenhofer – Life of Pi
  - Runner-up: The Avengers
    - Cloud Atlas
    - Prometheus
    - Snow White and the Huntsman

=== Best Arthouse or Festival Film ===
- Compliance (TIE)
- Safety Not Guaranteed (TIE)
  - Bernie
  - The Fairy (La fée)
  - Sleepwalk with Me
  - Take This Waltz

=== Best Scene ===
- Django Unchained: The "bag head" bag/mask problems scene (TIE)
- Hitchcock: Anthony Hopkins in lobby conducting to music/audience's reaction during Psycho shower scene (TIE)
- The Impossible: Opening tsunami scene (TIE)
- The Master: The first "processing" questioning scene between Philip Seymour Hoffman and Joaquin Phoenix (TIE)
  - Beasts of the Southern Wild: The hurricane (and Wink shooting at it)
  - Flight: The plane crash
