= 2024 St. Louis Film Critics Association Awards =

Awards ceremony

21st StLFCA Awards

December 15, 2024

Best Film:
Dune: Part Two

The nominees for the 21st St. Louis Film Critics Association Awards were announced on December 8, 2024.

Denis Villeneuve's epic science fiction film Dune: Part Two led the nominations with twelve, followed by The Brutalist with nine, and Conclave and Wicked with eight apiece. The categories for Best Vocal Performance and Best First Feature were introduced.

The winners were announced on December 15, 2024. The StLFCA also recognized Pete Timmermann with the Special Merit award for his work in supporting and promoting films in the St. Louis region.

== Winners and nominees ==
=== Best Film ===
- Dune: Part Two
  - Runner-up: Anora
    - The Brutalist
    - A Complete Unknown
    - Conclave
    - Nickel Boys
    - The Seed of the Sacred Fig
    - September 5
    - Sing Sing
    - Wicked

=== Best Actor ===
- Colman Domingo – Sing Sing as John "Divine G" Whitfield
  - Runner-up: Adrien Brody – The Brutalist as László Tóth
    - Timothée Chalamet – A Complete Unknown as Bob Dylan
    - Daniel Craig – Queer as William Lee
    - Ralph Fiennes – Conclave as Cardinal Thomas Lawrence
    - Hugh Grant – Heretic as Mr. Reed

=== Best Supporting Actor ===
- Kieran Culkin – A Real Pain as Benji Kaplan
  - Runner-up: Denzel Washington – Gladiator II as Macrinus
    - Clarence Maclin – Sing Sing as Clarence "Divine Eye" Maclin
    - Guy Pearce – The Brutalist as Harrison Lee Van Buren Sr.
    - Stanley Tucci – Conclave as Cardinal Aldo Bellini

=== Best Original Screenplay ===
- Saturday Night – Gil Kenan and Jason Reitman
  - Runner-up: Hard Truths – Mike Leigh
    - Anora – Sean Baker
    - The Brutalist – Brady Corbet and Mona Fastvold
    - A Real Pain – Jesse Eisenberg
    - The Seed of the Sacred Fig – Mohammad Rasoulof

=== Best Animated Feature ===
- The Wild Robot
  - Runner-up: Wallace & Gromit: Vengeance Most Fowl
    - Flow
    - Inside Out 2
    - Memoir of a Snail

=== Best International Feature Film ===
- The Seed of the Sacred Fig • Germany
  - Runner-up: Do Not Expect Too Much from the End of the World • Romania
    - All We Imagine as Light • India
    - Dahomey • Senegal
    - Emilia Pérez • France

=== Best Cinematography ===
- Nosferatu – Jarin Blaschke
  - Runner-up: Dune: Part Two – Greig Fraser
    - The Brutalist – Lol Crawley
    - Maria – Edward Lachman
    - Nickel Boys – Jomo Fray

=== Best Costume Design ===
- Wicked – Paul Tazewell
  - Runner-up: Nosferatu – Linda Muir
    - Dune: Part Two – Jacqueline West
    - Hundreds of Beavers – Casey Harris
    - Maria – Massimo Cantini Parrini

=== Best Score ===
- The Brutalist – Daniel Blumberg
  - Runner-up: Challengers – Trent Reznor and Atticus Ross
    - Conclave – Volker Bertelmann
    - Dune: Part Two – Hans Zimmer
    - The Wild Robot – Kris Bowers

=== Best Visual Effects ===
- Dune: Part Two – Paul Lambert, Stephen James, Rhys Salcombe, and Gerd Nefzer
  - Runner-up: Kingdom of the Planet of the Apes – Erik Winquist, Danielle Immerman, and Paul Story
    - Alien: Romulus – Eric Barba, Shane Mahan, and Nelson Sepulveda
    - Furiosa: A Mad Max Saga – Andrew Jackson, Dan Bethell, Eric Whipp, and Andy Williams
    - Nosferatu – Angela Barso and Lisa Wakeley

=== Best Comedy Film ===
- Hundreds of Beavers
  - Runner-up: Deadpool & Wolverine
    - The Fall Guy
    - A Real Pain
    - Saturday Night

=== Best Scene ===
- Civil War – "What kind of an American are you?"
  - Runner-up: Furiosa: A Mad Max Saga – War Rig battle
    - Dune: Part Two – Riding the Sandworm
    - His Three Daughters – Dad's Chair
    - The Substance – New Year's Eve performance

=== Best First Feature ===
- RaMell Ross – Nickel Boys
  - Runner-up: Malcolm Washington – The Piano Lesson
    - Annie Baker – Janet Planet
    - Anna Kendrick – Woman of the Hour
    - Josh Margolin – Thelma
    - Dev Patel – Monkey Man

=== Special Merit ===
- Pete Timmermann – "For his exceptional, expert programming of international, restored, and independent films, including fiction and nonfiction, animation and live action, in addition to special events. His superb offerings for the St. Louis film community enrich and expand our cinematic world."

=== Best Director ===
- Denis Villeneuve – Dune: Part Two
  - Runner-up: Mohammad Rasoulof – The Seed of the Sacred Fig
    - Edward Berger – Conclave
    - Brady Corbet – The Brutalist
    - RaMell Ross – Nickel Boys

=== Best Actress ===
- Mikey Madison – Anora as Anora "Ani" Mikheeva
  - Runner-up: Marianne Jean-Baptiste – Hard Truths as Pansy Deacon
    - Pamela Anderson – The Last Showgirl as Shelly Gardner
    - Cynthia Erivo – Wicked as Elphaba Thropp
    - Demi Moore – The Substance as Elisabeth Sparkle
    - Saoirse Ronan – The Outrun as Rona

=== Best Supporting Actress ===
- Aunjanue Ellis-Taylor – Nickel Boys as Hattie
  - Runner-up: Ariana Grande – Wicked as Galinda "Glinda" Upland
    - Monica Barbaro – A Complete Unknown as Joan Baez
    - Danielle Deadwyler – The Piano Lesson as Berniece
    - Zoe Saldaña – Emilia Pérez as Rita Mora Castro

=== Best Adapted Screenplay ===
- Conclave – Peter Straughan; based on the novel by Robert Harris
  - Runner-up: Dune: Part Two – Denis Villeneuve and Jon Spaihts; based on the novel by Frank Herbert
    - Nickel Boys – RaMell Ross and Joslyn Barnes; based on the novel The Nickel Boys by Colson Whitehead
    - Sing Sing – Clint Bentley, Greg Kwedar, Clarence Maclin, and John "Divine G" Whitfield; based on the book "The Sing Sing Follies" by John H. Richardson and the play Breakin' the Mummy's Code by Brent Buell
    - Wicked – Winnie Holzman and Dana Fox; based on the musical by Stephen Schwartz and other related media

=== Best Documentary Feature ===
- No Other Land
  - Runner-up: Super/Man: The Christopher Reeve Story
    - Daughters
    - Music by John Williams
    - Sugarcane
    - Will & Harper

=== Best Ensemble ===
- Conclave
  - Runner-up: Saturday Night
    - Dune: Part Two
    - Sing Sing
    - Wicked

=== Best Editing ===
- Nickel Boys – Nicholas Monsour
  - Runner-up: September 5 – Hansjörg Weißbrich
    - The Brutalist – Dávid Jancsó
    - Dune: Part Two – Joe Walker
    - Saturday Night – Nathan Orloff and Shane Reid

=== Best Production Design ===
- Nosferatu – Beatrice Brentnerová, Paul Ghirardani, and Craig Lathrop
  - Runner-up: Wicked – Nathan Crowley and Lee Sandales
    - The Brutalist – Judy Becker
    - Conclave – Suzie Davies and Roberta Federico
    - Dune: Part Two – Zsuzsanna Sipos, Shane Vieau, and Patrice Vermette

=== Best Soundtrack ===
- A Complete Unknown
  - Runner-up: Wicked
    - Deadpool & Wolverine
    - I Saw the TV Glow
    - Maria

=== Best Action Film ===
- Furiosa: A Mad Max Saga
  - Runner-up: Dune: Part Two
    - Deadpool & Wolverine
    - The Fall Guy
    - Monkey Man

=== Best Horror Film ===
- Nosferatu
  - Runner-up: The Substance
    - Heretic
    - I Saw the TV Glow
    - Late Night with the Devil
    - Longlegs

=== Best Stunts ===
- The Fall Guy
  - Runner-up: Furiosa: A Mad Max Saga
    - Deadpool & Wolverine
    - Gladiator II
    - Monkey Man

=== Best Vocal Performance ===
- Lupita Nyong'o – The Wild Robot as Roz
  - Runner-up: Maya Hawke – Inside Out 2 as Anxiety
    - Pedro Pascal – The Wild Robot as Fink
    - Amy Poehler – Inside Out 2 as Joy
    - Sarah Snook – Memoir of a Snail as Grace Pudel
