= 2008 St. Louis Film Critics Association Awards =

Annual US film awards ceremony

5th SLGFCA Awards

December 15, 2008

Best Film:
The Curious Case of Benjamin Button

Best Director:
Danny Boyle
Slumdog Millionaire

The 5th St. Louis Film Critics Association Awards were awarded on December 15, 2008.

== Winners and nominees ==
=== Best Actor ===
- Sean Penn – Milk as Harvey Milk
  - Frank Langella – Frost/Nixon
  - Richard Jenkins – The Visitor
  - Mickey Rourke – The Wrestler
  - Leonardo DiCaprio – Revolutionary Road

=== Best Actress ===
- Kate Winslet – Revolutionary Road as April Wheeler and The Reader as Hanna Schmidtz
  - Angelina Jolie – Changeling
  - Cate Blanchett – The Curious Case of Benjamin Button
  - Anne Hathaway – Rachel Getting Married

=== Best Animated Film ===
- WALL-E
  - Kung Fu Panda
  - Madagascar: Escape 2 Africa
  - Bolt
  - Chicago 10
  - Waltz With Bashir

=== Best cinematography ===
- Australia – Mandy Walker
  - The Curious Case of Benjamin Button – Claudio Miranda
  - The Dark Knight – Wally Pfister
  - Revolutionary Road – Roger Deakins
  - Slumdog Millionaire – Anthony Dod Mantle
  - Milk – Harris Savides

=== Best Director ===
- Danny Boyle – Slumdog Millionaire
  - Ron Howard – Frost/Nixon
  - David Fincher – The Curious Case of BenjaminButton
  - Gus Van Sant – Milk
  - Christopher Nolan – The Dark Knight

=== Best Documentary Film ===
- Man on Wire
  - Body of War
  - Pray the Devil Back to Hell
  - Shine a Light
  - Standard Operating Procedure

=== Best Film ===
- The Curious Case of Benjamin Button
  - Milk
  - Slumdog Millionaire
  - The Dark Knight
  - Frost/Nixon

=== Best Film – Comedy ===
- Burn After Reading
  - Zack and Miri Make a Porno
  - Tropic Thunder
  - Forgetting Sarah Marshall
  - Role Models

=== Best Foreign Language Film ===
- Slumdog Millionaire • India/UK/United States
  - Let the Right One In • Sweden
  - The Class • France
  - I've Loved You So Long • France
  - Tell No One • France

=== Best Music ===
- The Visitor
  - Gran Torino
  - WALL-E
  - Cadillac Records
  - The Dark Knight

=== Best Screenplay ===
- Frost/Nixon – Peter Morgan
  - The Curious Case of Benjamin Button – Eric Roth and Robin Swicord
  - Gran Torino – Nick Schenk
  - Slumdog Millionaire – Simon Beaufoy
  - Milk – Dustin Lance Black

=== Best Supporting Actor ===
- Heath Ledger – The Dark Knight as The Joker posthumous win
  - Josh Brolin – Milk
  - Robert Downey Jr. – Tropic Thunder
  - Michael Shannon – Revolutionary Road
  - Jeffrey Wright – Cadillac Records
  - John Malkovich – Burn After Reading

=== Best Supporting Actress ===
- Viola Davis – Doubt as Mrs. Miller
  - Taraji P. Henson – The Curious Case of Benjamin Button
  - Penélope Cruz – Vicky Cristina Barcelona
  - Marisa Tomei – The Wrestler
  - Frances McDormand – Burn After Reading
  - Amy Adams – Doubt

=== Best Visual Effects ===
- The Dark Knight
  - The Curious Case of Benjamin Button
  - Iron Man
  - Speed Racer
  - WALL-E
  - Synecdoche, New York

=== Most Original, Innovative or Creative Film ===
- The Curious Case of Benjamin Button
  - Wall-E
  - Speed Racer
  - Waltz With Bashir
  - Slumdog Millionaire
  - Synecdoche, New York
