= 2015 St. Louis Film Critics Association Awards =

Film Awards

10th SLGFCA Awards

December 20, 2015

Best Film:
Spotlight

Best Director:
Tom McCarthy
Spotlight

The nominees for the 12th St. Louis Film Critics Association Awards were announced on December 13, 2015.

== Winners, runners-up and nominees ==
=== Best Film ===
- Spotlight
  - Runner-up: Inside Out
- Mad Max: Fury Road
- The Revenant
- Room

=== Best Actor ===
- Leonardo DiCaprio – The Revenant
  - Runner-up: Ian McKellen – Mr. Holmes
- Abraham Attah – Beasts of No Nation
- Matt Damon – The Martian
- Eddie Redmayne – The Danish Girl

=== Best Supporting Actor ===
- Sylvester Stallone – Creed
  - Runner-up: Mark Rylance – Bridge of Spies
- Paul Dano – Love & Mercy
- Idris Elba – Beasts of No Nation
- Mark Ruffalo – Spotlight

=== Best Original Screenplay ===
- Spotlight – Tom McCarthy and Josh Singer
  - Runner-up: Ex Machina – Alex Garland
- Clouds of Sils Maria – Olivier Assayas
- The Hateful Eight – Quentin Tarantino
- Inside Out – Pete Docter, Meg LeFauve, and Josh Cooley

=== Best Cinematography ===
- The Revenant – Emmanuel Lubezki
  - Runner-up: Carol – Edward Lachman
- Beasts of No Nation – Cary Fukunaga
- The Hateful Eight – Robert Richardson
- Mad Max: Fury Road – John Seale

=== Best Editing ===
- Mad Max: Fury Road – Margaret Sixel
  - Runner-up: The Revenant – Stephen Mirrione
- The Big Short – Hank Corwin
- The Martian – Pietro Scalia
- Spotlight – Tom McArdle

=== Best Music ===
- Ennio Morricone – The Hateful Eight
  - Runner-up: Michael Giacchino – Inside Out
- Carter Burwell – Carol
- Disasterpeace – It Follows
- Junkie XL – Mad Max: Fury Road

=== Best Art Direction ===
- Mad Max: Fury Road
  - Runner-up (tie): Brooklyn, Carol, and The Danish Girl
- Cinderella

=== Best Foreign Language Film ===
- Goodnight Mommy • Austria
  - Runner-up Son of Saul • Hungary
- The Assassin • Taiwan
- Phoenix • Germany
- Wild Tales • Argentina

=== Best Animated Feature ===
- Inside Out
  - Runner-up: Anomalisa
- The Good Dinosaur
- The Peanuts Movie
- Shaun the Sheep Movie

=== Best Scene ===
(favorite movie scene or sequence)

- The Revenant: Hugh mauled by a grizzly
  - Runner-up: The Walk: The walk between the Twin Towers
- Creed: Creed’s first fight.
- Furious 7: The farewell scene between Vin Diesel and Paul Walker.
- Room: Jack’s escape and rescue.

=== Best Director ===
- Tom McCarthy – Spotlight
  - Runner-up: George Miller – Mad Max: Fury Road
- Todd Haynes – Carol
- Alejandro G. Iñárritu – The Revenant
- Ridley Scott – The Martian

=== Best Actress ===
- Brie Larson – Room
  - Runner-up: Saoirse Ronan – Brooklyn
- Cate Blanchett – Carol
- Charlize Theron – Mad Max: Fury Road
- Alicia Vikander – The Danish Girl

=== Best Supporting Actress ===
- Alicia Vikander – Ex Machina
  - Runner-up (tie): Kristen Stewart – Clouds of Sils Maria and Rooney Mara – Carol
- Jennifer Jason Leigh – The Hateful Eight
- Kate Winslet – Steve Jobs

=== Best Adapted Screenplay ===
- The Martian – Drew Goddard
  - Runner-up: Brooklyn – Nick Hornby
- Creed – Ryan Coogler and Aaron Covington
- Room – Emma Donoghue
- Steve Jobs – Aaron Sorkin

=== Best Visual Effects ===
- Mad Max: Fury Road
  - Runner-up: The Walk
- Ex Machina
- The Martian
- The Revenant

=== Best Song ===
- "Writing's on the Wall" – Spectre
  - Runner-up: "See You Again" – Furious 7
- "Feels Like Summer" – Shaun the Sheep Movie
- "Til It Happens to You" – The Hunting Ground
- "Simple Song #3" – Youth

=== Best Soundtrack ===
- Love & Mercy
  - Runner-up: Straight Outta Compton
- Amy
- Dope
- The Martian

=== Best Documentary Film ===
- Amy
  - Runner-up: The Look of Silence
- Best of Enemies
- Cartel Land
- The Hunting Ground

=== Best Comedy ===
- Trainwreck
  - Runner-up: Me and Earl and the Dying Girl
- Inside Out
- Spy
- What We Do in the Shadows

=== Worst Film ===
- Fantastic Four
  - Runner-up: Aloha
- The Boy Next Door
- Jem and the Holograms
- Jupiter Ascending
- Mortdecai
- Paul Blart: Mall Cop 2
- The Ridiculous 6
- Stonewall
- Strange Magic

SPECIAL RECOGNITION: The stunt work on Mad Max: Fury Road.
