= 2010 St. Louis Film Critics Association Awards =

Annual US film awards ceremony

7th StLFCA Awards

December 20, 2010

Best Film:
The Social Network

Best Director:
David Fincher
The Social Network

The 7th St. Louis Film Critics Association Awards were announced on December 20, 2010.

== Winners and nominees ==
=== Best Actor ===
- Javier Bardem – Biutiful
- Jeff Bridges – True Grit
- Jesse Eisenberg – The Social Network
  - Colin Firth – The King's Speech
- James Franco – 127 Hours

=== Best Actress ===
- Nicole Kidman – Rabbit Hole
- Jennifer Lawrence – Winter's Bone
  - Natalie Portman – Black Swan
- Noomi Rapace – The Girl with the Dragon Tattoo
- Naomi Watts – Fair Game

=== Best Animated Film ===
- Despicable Me
- How to Train Your Dragon
- Legend of the Guardians: The Owls of Ga'Hoole
- Tangled
  - Toy Story 3

=== Best Director ===
- Darren Aronofsky – Black Swan
- Danny Boyle – 127 Hours
  - David Fincher – The Social Network
- Tom Hooper – The King's Speech
- Christopher Nolan – Inception

=== Best Documentary Film ===
- A Film Unfinished
- Restrepo
  - The Tillman Story
- Waiting for "Superman"
- Waking Sleeping Beauty

=== Best Film ===
- Black Swan
- The Fighter
- Inception
- The King's Speech
  - The Social Network

=== Best Comedy ===
- Easy A
- I Love You Phillip Morris
- Jackass 3D
- Micmacs
  - Scott Pilgrim vs. the World

=== Best Foreign Language Film ===
- Biutiful • Mexico
- The Girl with the Dragon Tattoo (Män som hatar kvinnor) • Sweden
  - Micmacs (Micmacs à tire-larigot) • France
- North Face (Nordwand) • Germany
- A Prophet (Un prophète) • France

=== Best Music ===
- Black Swan
- Burlesque
- The Fighter
- Inception
  - The Social Network

=== Best Original Screenplay ===
- Biutiful – Alejandro González Iñárritu, Armando Bo and Nicolás Giacobone
- Black Swan – Mark Heyman, Andres Heinz and John McLaughlin
- The Fighter – Scott Silver, Paul Tamasy and Eric Johnson
- Inception – Christopher Nolan
  - The King's Speech – David Seidler

=== Best Adapted Screenplay ===
- 127 Hours – Simon Beaufoy and Danny Boyle
- Scott Pilgrim vs. the World – Edgar Wright and Michael Bacall
  - The Social Network – Aaron Sorkin
- True Grit – Joel and Ethan Coen
- Winter's Bone – Debra Granik and Anne Rosellini

=== Best Supporting Actor ===
  - Christian Bale – The Fighter
- John Hawkes – Winter's Bone
- Jeremy Renner – The Town
- Sam Rockwell – Conviction
- Geoffrey Rush – The King's Speech

=== Best Supporting Actress ===
- Amy Adams – The Fighter
- Helena Bonham Carter – The King's Speech
- Barbara Hershey – Black Swan
  - Melissa Leo – The Fighter
- Hailee Steinfeld – True Grit

=== Best Visual Effects ===
- Harry Potter and the Deathly Hallows – Part 1
  - Inception
- Kick-Ass
- Scott Pilgrim vs. the World
- Tron: Legacy

=== Moving the Medium Forward ===
(for technical/artistic innovative that advances the medium)

- 127 Hours
  - Inception
- Kick-Ass
- Scott Pilgrim vs. the World
- Toy Story 3
- Uncle Boonmee Who Can Recall His Past Lives

=== Best Artistic/Creative Film ===
(for excellence in art-house cinema)

- The King's Speech
  - Micmacs
- Scott Pilgrim vs. the World
- Trash Humpers
- Winter's Bone

=== Special Merit ===
(for best scene, cinematic technique or other memorable aspect or moment)

- 127 Hours: the zoom-up scene which begins with a tight shot on Aron (James Franco) as he is screaming and pulls out to a wide shot of a large land area, showing how isolated he was from other humans.

- Easy A: the John Hughes tribute near the beginning.
- Harry Potter and the Deathly Hallows – Part 1: the “obliviate” scene in which Hermione erases her parents’ memories of her.
  - Inception: the zero-gravity hotel fight in the tumbling hallway scene with Joseph Gordon-Levitt.
- Kick-Ass: the Hit-Girl kill spree.
