= 2017 St. Louis Film Critics Association Awards =

Annual US film awards ceremony

14h StLFCA Awards

December 17, 2017

Best Film:
The Shape of Water

Best Director:
Guillermo del Toro
The Shape of Water

The nominees for the 14th St. Louis Film Critics Association Awards were announced on December 10, 2017. The winners were announced on December 17, 2017.

== Winners and nominees ==
=== Best Film ===
- The Shape of Water
- Get Out
- Lady Bird
- The Post
- Three Billboards Outside Ebbing, Missouri

=== Best Actor ===
- Gary Oldman – Darkest Hour
- Daniel Day-Lewis – Phantom Thread
- James Franco – The Disaster Artist
- Tom Hanks – The Post
- Daniel Kaluuya – Get Out

=== Best Supporting Actor ===
- Richard Jenkins – The Shape of Water
- Willem Dafoe – The Florida Project
- Woody Harrelson – Three Billboards Outside Ebbing, Missouri
- Sam Rockwell – Three Billboards Outside Ebbing, Missouri
- Michael Shannon – The Shape of Water

=== Best Original Screenplay ===
- The Shape of Water – Guillermo del Toro and Vanessa Taylor
- The Big Sick – Emily V. Gordon and Kumail Nanjiani
- Get Out – Jordan Peele
- Lady Bird – Greta Gerwig
- Three Billboards Outside Ebbing, Missouri – Martin McDonagh

=== Best Cinematography ===
- Blade Runner 2049 – Roger Deakins
- Darkest Hour – Bruno Delbonnel
- Dunkirk – Hoyte van Hoytema
- The Shape of Water – Dan Laustsen
- Wonder Wheel – Vittorio Storaro

=== Best Editing ===
- Baby Driver – Jonathan Amos and Paul Machliss
- Darkest Hour – Valerio Bonelli
- Dunkirk – Lee Smith
- The Post – Sarah Broshar and Michael Kahn
- The Shape of Water – Sidney Wolinsky

=== Best Production Design ===
- The Shape of Water – Paul D. Austerberry
- Beauty and the Beast – Sarah Greenwood
- Blade Runner 2049 – Dennis Gassner
- Dunkirk – Nathan Crowley
- Phantom Thread – Mark Tildesley

=== Best Foreign Language Feature ===
- Land of Mine
- First They Killed My Father
- Frantz
- Graduation
- The Square

=== Best Animated Feature ===
- Coco
- Captain Underpants: The First Epic Movie
- Despicable Me 3
- The Lego Batman Movie
- Loving Vincent

=== Best Director ===
- Guillermo del Toro – The Shape of Water
- Greta Gerwig – Lady Bird
- Jordan Peele – Get Out
- Steven Spielberg – The Post
- Denis Villeneuve – Blade Runner 2049

=== Best Actress ===
- Frances McDormand – Three Billboards Outside Ebbing, Missouri
- Sally Hawkins – The Shape of Water
- Saoirse Ronan – Lady Bird
- Kristen Stewart – Personal Shopper
- Meryl Streep – The Post

=== Best Supporting Actress ===
- Laurie Metcalf – Lady Bird
- Hong Chau – Downsizing
- Holly Hunter – The Big Sick
- Kristin Scott Thomas – Darkest Hour
- Octavia Spencer – The Shape of Water

=== Best Adapted Screenplay ===
- The Disaster Artist – Scott Neustadter and Michael H. Weber (Screenplay); Greg Sestero and Tom Bissell (Book)
- Call Me by Your Name – James Ivory (Screenplay); André Aciman (Novel)
- It – Chase Palmer, Cary Fukunaga, and Gary Dauberman (Screenplay); Stephen King (Novel)
- Molly's Game – Aaron Sorkin (Screenplay); Molly Bloom (Book)
- Mudbound – Virgil Williams and Dee Rees (Screenplay); Hillary Jordan (Novel)

=== Best Visual Effects ===
- Blade Runner 2049
- Beauty and the Beast
- Dunkirk
- The Shape of Water
- War for the Planet of the Apes

=== Best Score ===
- Phantom Thread – Jonny Greenwood
- Blade Runner 2049 – Benjamin Wallfisch and Hans Zimmer
- Dunkirk – Hans Zimmer
- The Post – John Williams
- The Shape of Water – Alexandre Desplat

=== Best Soundtrack ===
- Baby Driver
- Atomic Blonde
- Coco
- Guardians of the Galaxy Vol. 2
- Three Billboards Outside Ebbing, Missouri

=== Best Documentary Feature ===
- Jane
- City of Ghosts
- Last Men in Aleppo
- Never Say Goodbye: The KSHE Documentary
- Whose Streets?

=== Best Scene ===
- The Disaster Artist – Sixty-seven takes of "I did not hit her"
- Atomic Blonde – Stairwell fight
- Baby Driver – Baby (Ansel Elgort) goes for coffee (opening credits)
- Call Me By Your Name – Mr. Perlman's (Michael Stuhlbarg) closing monologue
- Lady Bird – Chalk talk for 'The Tempest'

== Multiple nominations and awards ==
These films had multiple nominations:

- 12 nominations: The Shape of Water
- 6 nominations: Lady Bird, The Post, Three Billboards Outside Ebbing, Missouri
- 5 nominations: Blade Runner 2049, Dunkirk
- 4 nominations: Darkest Hour, Get Out
- 3 nominations: Baby Driver, The Disaster Artist, Phantom Thread
- 2 nominations: Atomic Blonde, Beauty and the Beast, The Big Sick, Call Me by Your Name, Coco

These films had multiple wins:

- 5 wins: The Shape of Water
- 2 wins: Baby Driver, Blade Runner 2049, The Disaster Artist
