= Benediction (disambiguation) =

A benediction is a religious invocation.

Benediction may also refer to:

- "Benediction" (Angel), an episode of Angel
- Benediction (band), a British death metal band
- Benediction (play), a play by Eric Schmiedl
- Benediction, a 2013 novel by Kent Haruf
- "Benediction" (short story), a 1920 short story by F. Scott Fitzgerald
- Benediction (film), a 2021 biographical drama film
- "Benediction", a song by the Carpenters from the album Ticket to Ride, 1969
- "Benediction", a song by Jars of Clay from the album The Shelter, 2010
- "Benediction", a song by Relient K from their 2000 self-titled debut album

== See also ==
- Benediction of the Blessed Sacrament, in Roman Catholic and Anglo-Catholic churches, the display of the Eucharist
- Benedictional, a book containing blessings
- Benedictional of St. Æthelwold, an illuminated benedictional from the 10th century
- Benedictive, a grammatical mood in Sanskrit
- Hand of benediction, a hand injury
