= Michael H. Weber =

American screenwriter and film producer

- Born: January 13, 1978 (age 48) Great Neck, New York, U.S.
- Occupation: Screenwriter, producer
- Years active: 2009–present
- Notable works: 500 Days of Summer

Michael H. Weber (born January 13, 1978) is an American screenwriter and producer. He and his writing partner, Scott Neustadter, are best known for writing the screenplay for the romantic comedy film 500 Days of Summer. The film is based on two real relationships Neustadter had. They also wrote the screenplays for the film adaptations of the novels The Spectacular Now, The Fault in Our Stars, and Paper Towns.

For writing The Disaster Artist, Neustadter and Weber were nominated for an Academy Award for Best Adapted Screenplay. They also created the sitcom Friends with Benefits, which lasted one season.

== Early life ==
Weber grew up in a Jewish family in Great Neck, New York. He attended John L. Miller Great Neck North High School, and strongly identified with teen films as he was growing up, particularly those made by John Hughes and Cameron Crowe; he cites Ferris Bueller's Day Off and The Breakfast Club as two films he identified with in high school since he often skipped school and spent time in detention. He attended Syracuse University and graduated in 2000.

== Career ==
Weber met his writing partner Scott Neustadter in 1999 at TriBeCa Productions when Neustadter hired Weber as his development intern. They started writing comedy together in their spare time, and soon after began writing a screenplay based on a failed relationship that Neustadter had experienced. They broke out as screenwriters in 2006, when they successfully sold their spec script, titled 500 Days of Summer, to Fox Searchlight Pictures. While 500 Days of Summer was still in pre-production, Sony Pictures Entertainment asked Weber and Neustadter to write The Pink Panther 2, the sequel to The Pink Panther (2006), which in turn was a reboot of the original Pink Panther franchise. They originally declined the job offer from Sony but ended up accepting it and writing the script after their managers stressed how "important [it was] to get a movie made". Both 500 Days of Summer and The Pink Panther 2 were released in 2009; although The Pink Panther 2 was panned by reviewers, 500 Days of Summer was well received by critics and audiences alike, and it was Fox Searchlight's highest grossing film of the year. The latter also received numerous awards and accolades, including an Independent Spirit Award for Best Screenplay and a Writers Guild of America Award nomination for Best Original Screenplay.

In 2009, Weber and Neustadter began developing a television sitcom for ABC called Friends with Benefits. The project was later moved to NBC and premiered in August 2011. Although it was the most successful of NBC's new comedy series for the 2010–11 season, it was cancelled after one season. They later adapted Tim Tharp's novel The Spectacular Now into a film of the same name, a romantic drama about high school students and alcoholism. They were commissioned to write the screenplay in 2009 by Fox Searchlight, who had produced their first script, 500 Days of Summer, but the film languished in pre-production for several years before it was picked up by director James Ponsoldt. The film was released in August 2013 to almost universally positive critical reviews. Weber and Neustadter's script was nominated for an Independent Spirit Award for Best Screenplay and the film won a National Board of Review award for Best Independent Film.

When Weber and Neustadter heard that 20th Century Fox had purchased the rights to adapt The Fault in Our Stars—a young adult novel written by John Green, about the romantic relationship between two teenagers with cancer—into a film, they campaigned the company's president to hire them to write the screenplay. Weber has said that they won the job by promising not to alter much from the book: "Hello! Please hire us! We want to bring absolutely nothing to the table!" The film, released in 2014, received positive reviews and performed well at the box office. They also adapted another Green book, Paper Towns, into a film of the same name.

Weber and Neustadter have also been hired to write Rosaline, a contemporary adaptation of Romeo and Juliet, as well as adaptations of the books Me Before You by Jojo Moyes (the film adaptation was ultimately released in 2016 without their involvement), and Rules of Civility by Amor Towles. They have also sold at least eight spec scripts since 500 Days of Summer; these include Starfish (bought by 20th Century Fox), Underage (bought by Montecito Pictures), and No Relation (bought by Fox Searchlight).

Weber and Neustadter wrote the script for The Disaster Artist (2017), the adaptation of the book of the same name. They also wrote Our Souls at Night, an adaptation of Kent Haruf's final novel of the same name, for Netflix, with Robert Redford and Jane Fonda playing the lead roles, the first movie they have made together since 1979's The Electric Horseman.

Weber and Neustadter were set to adapt another John Green book, Looking for Alaska, although the book was later adapted into a TV miniseries without their involvement. They also are adapting The Rosie Project, with Jennifer Lawrence formerly set to star.

In 2019, Weber joined other WGA writers in firing their agents as part of the WGA's stand against the ATA and the practice of packaging.

== Personal life ==
Weber lives in the East Village of Manhattan, New York. He communicates with Neustadter, who lives in Los Angeles, by telephone and email.

== Filmography ==
Film

Year	Title	Writer	Executive Producer	Director
2009	500 Days of Summer	Yes	No	Marc Webb
2009	The Pink Panther 2	Yes	No	Harald Zwart
2013	The Spectacular Now	Yes	Yes	James Ponsoldt
2014	The Fault in Our Stars	Yes	No	Josh Boone
2015	Paper Towns	Yes	Yes	Jake Schreier
2017	The Disaster Artist	Yes	Yes	James Franco
2017	Our Souls at Night	Yes	No	Ritesh Batra
2022	Rosaline	Yes	No	Karen Maine

Television

Year	Title	Writer	Executive Producer	Creator	Notes
2011	Friends with Benefits	Yes	Yes	Yes	
2023	Daisy Jones & the Six	Yes	Yes	Developer	Miniseries

== Awards and nominations ==
Year	Award	Category	Title	Result
2009	Critics' Choice Movie Awards	Best Original Screenplay	500 Days of Summer	Nominated
2009	Utah Film Critics Association	Best Screenplay	500 Days of Summer	Nominated
2009	Washington D.C. Area Film Critics Association	Best Original Screenplay	500 Days of Summer	Nominated
2009	Hollywood Film Festival	Breakthrough Screenwriter	500 Days of Summer	Won
2009	Independent Spirit Awards	Best Screenplay	500 Days of Summer	Won
2009	Las Vegas Film Critics Society	Best Screenplay	500 Days of Summer	Won
2009	Oklahoma Film Critics Circle	Best Screenplay - Original	500 Days of Summer	Won
2009	Satellite Awards	Best Original Screenplay	500 Days of Summer	Won
2009	Southeastern Film Critics Association	Best Original Screenplay	500 Days of Summer	Won
2009	St. Louis Film Critics Association	Best Screenplay	500 Days of Summer	Won
2009	Writers Guild of America	Best Original Screenplay	500 Days of Summer	Nominated
2013	Alliance of Women Film Journalists	Best Adapted Screenplay	The Spectacular Now	Nominated
2013	Independent Spirit Awards	Best Screenplay	The Spectacular Now	Nominated
2013	Indiana Film Critics Association	Best Screenplay	The Spectacular Now	Nominated
2013	San Francisco Film Critics Circle	Best Adapted Screenplay	The Spectacular Now	Nominated
2013	St. Louis Film Critics Association	Best Adapted Screenplay	The Spectacular Now	Nominated
2013	Washington D.C. Area Film Critics Association	Best Adapted Screenplay	The Spectacular Now	Nominated
2017	Academy Awards	Best Adapted Screenplay	The Disaster Artist	Nominated
2017	Writers Guild of America	Best Adapted Screenplay	The Disaster Artist	Nominated
