= Our Souls at Night (novel) =

2015 novel by Kent Haruf

- Author: Kent Haruf
- Language: English
- Genre: Fiction
- Publisher: Alfred A. Knopf
- Publication date: May 2015
- Publication place: United States
- Media type: Print (hardback & paperback)
- Pages: 179
- ISBN: 9781101875896

Our Souls at Night is the final novel by the American author Kent Haruf, published posthumously by Knopf in 2015. Haruf composed the book in the final year of his life, working on revisions up until his death from lung disease in 2014.

Set in a small town on the High Plains, the novel follows the relationship between Louis and Addie, a widow and widower who seek companionship in each other to combat loneliness in old age. While initially platonic, their connection develops into a strong, romantic bond as they discuss their lives and engage in ordinary activities together.

The book received positive reviews for its tender depiction of romance at a late age, as well as its portrayal of everyday life. A film adaptation, also called Our Souls at Night, was released in 2017, starring Robert Redford and Jane Fonda.

== Background ==
Haruf was born in 1943 and raised in Colorado. He wrote five prior novels and several short stories set in Eastern Colorado, basing his fictional town of Holt on Yuma, Colorado and others like the ones he grew up in.

Prior to writing Our Souls at Night, he received a diagnosis of interstitial lung disease in early 2014 at the age of 71. Drawing on his relationship with his wife, Kathy, Haruf composed a first draft of Our Souls at Night in just 45 days between June and May, compared to the six years it normally took him to write a novel. He worked on revisions until a few days before his death in November. Kathy reflected on the book in an interview that Haruf enjoyed talking with her at night, like in the scenes with Addie and Louis: "when we'd lie in bed at night, hold hands, and talk over everything: the day, living, dying, kids. He loved that. So I realized that's what he's talking about." The novel also includes some metafiction, with Addie and Louis musing about a Colorado author who could write a book about them.

== Plot ==
The novel is set in Holt. During a quiet evening at home, Louis receives a visit from his neighbor, Addie. She proposes that Louis join her in bed each night at her house as a way to combat loneliness. They are both living alone following the death of their spouses. After considering the proposal, Louis agrees, and they begin to develop a close relationship. He tells her about his shame at having cheated on his wife thirty years ago, while she explains the aftermath of her daughter's death. While playing outside, a car struck Connie in front of her little brother, Gene. The trauma of Connie's death deeply affected Gene, and it also led to a deterioration in Addie's relationship with her husband.

While initially hesitant to appear in public because of small-town gossip, Louis begins to embrace the relationship, enjoying outings with Addie. Their bond undergoes a development when Gene drops off Addie's grandson, Jamie. The arrangement lasts several weeks as Gene deals with financial trouble and estrangement from his wife. During this time, the homesick Jamie seeks comfort at night in Addie's bed, including with Louis. They adopt a dog to comfort the boy and engage him in several activities, including taking him to a softball game and to the mountains for camping. Louis also buys the boy a mitt to play catch with him.

When Gene later retrieves Jamie, he is upset about the relationship between his mom and Louis. He disallows them from continuing to see each other, threatening to cut off Addie's contact with Jamie. Addie relents and agrees to no longer see Louis. They both struggle with the pain of the breakup and miss each other. Louis sees her again in the hospital after she breaks her hip, when Gene allows him to see her for five minutes. Addie later restarts the relationship over the phone when out of earshot of her son.

== Reception ==
In a review for The Guardian, Ursula K Le Guin praised the book as moving and authentic, especially considering the circumstances under which Haruf wrote it: "Having gone farther than we have, he wants to tell us what matters there." A review in The New York Times by Joan Silber described the novel as built around the idea that "simple elements carry depth, and readers will find much to be grateful for". Siber, however, noted that the novel "suffers from sparse dialogue" in some scenes.

A film adaptation also titled Our Souls at Night released on Netflix in 2017 and starred Robert Redford as Louis and Jane Fonda as Addie.
