= Scott Neustadter =

American screenwriter and film producer

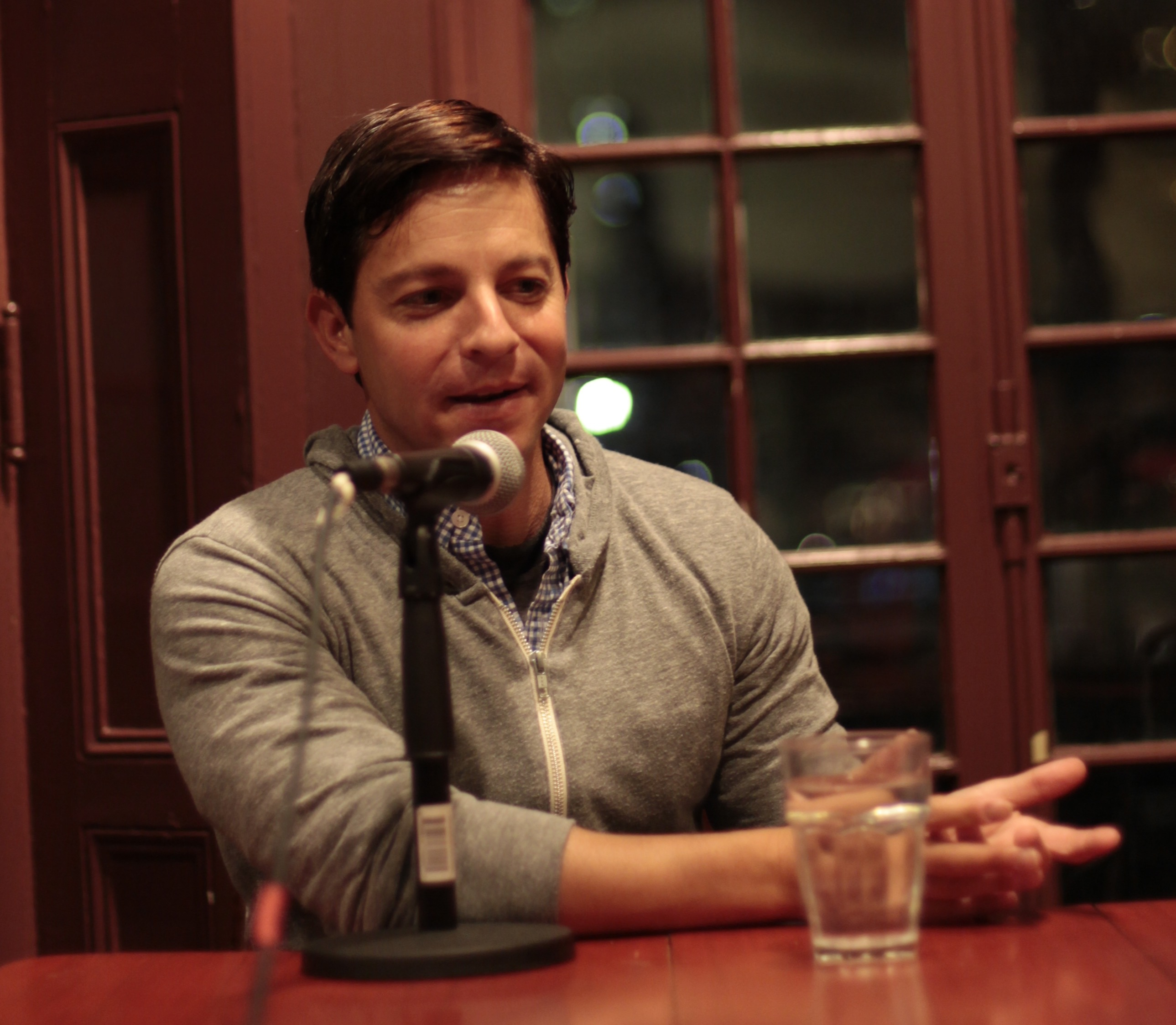
- Neustadter at the Kelly Writers House in 2016
- Born: 1977 (age 48–49); Margate City, New Jersey, U.S.
- Education: Atlantic City High School
- Alma mater: University of Pennsylvania; London School of Economics
- Occupations: Screenwriter and producer
- Years active: 2009–present
- Notable work: 500 Days of Summer
- Spouse: Lauren Rachelle Levy (m. 2010)
- Children: 2

Scott Eric Neustadter (/njuːˈstætər/; born 1977) is an American screenwriter and producer. He often works with his writing partner, Michael H. Weber. The two writers are best known for writing the screenplay for the romantic comedy film 500 Days of Summer. The film is based on two real relationships Neustadter had. They also wrote the screenplays for the film adaptations of the novels The Spectacular Now, The Fault in Our Stars, and Paper Towns.

For writing The Disaster Artist, Neustadter and Weber were nominated for an Academy Award for Best Adapted Screenplay. They also created the television series Friends with Benefits, which lasted one season.

== Life and career ==
Neustadter was born and raised in a Jewish family in Margate City, New Jersey, the son of Anne (née Goldberg) and Michael J. Neustadter. He attended Atlantic City High School, University of Pennsylvania and graduate studies at The London School of Economics and The University of Southern California.

At age 25, Neustadter moved to study in Los Angeles, California, and shortly thereafter moved to Santa Monica, where he currently resides.

Neustadter and Weber wrote the script for The Disaster Artist (2017), the adaptation of the book of the same name. They also wrote Our Souls at Night, an adaptation of Kent Haruf's final novel of the same name, for Netflix, with Robert Redford and Jane Fonda playing the lead roles, the first movie they have made together since 1979's The Electric Horseman.

As of 2014, they are adapting The Rosie Project.

Neustadter has been married to Lauren Rachelle Levy since October 9, 2010. The couple has one son and one daughter.

== Filmography ==
Film

| Year | Title | Writer | Executive producer | Director |
|---|---|---|---|---|
| 2009 | 500 Days of Summer | Yes | No | Marc Webb |
| 2009 | The Pink Panther 2 | Yes | No | Harald Zwart |
| 2013 | The Spectacular Now | Yes | Yes | James Ponsoldt |
| 2014 | The Fault in Our Stars | Yes | No | Josh Boone |
| 2015 | Paper Towns | Yes | Yes | Jake Schreier |
| 2017 | The Disaster Artist | Yes | Yes | James Franco |
| 2017 | Our Souls at Night | Yes | No | Ritesh Batra |
| 2022 | Rosaline | Yes | No | Karen Maine |

Television

| Year | Title | Writer | Executive producer | Creator | Notes |
|---|---|---|---|---|---|
| 2011 | Friends with Benefits | Yes | Yes | Yes | |
| 2023 | Daisy Jones & the Six | Yes | Yes | Developer | Miniseries |

== Awards and nominations ==
| Year | Award | Category | Title | Result |
|---|---|---|---|---|
| 2009 | Critics' Choice Movie Awards | Best Original Screenplay | 500 Days of Summer | Nominated |
| 2009 | Utah Film Critics Association | Best Screenplay | 500 Days of Summer | Nominated |
| 2009 | Washington D.C. Area Film Critics Association | Best Original Screenplay | 500 Days of Summer | Nominated |
| 2009 | Hollywood Film Festival | Breakthrough Screenwriter | 500 Days of Summer | Won |
| 2009 | Independent Spirit Awards | Best Screenplay | 500 Days of Summer | Won |
| 2009 | Las Vegas Film Critics Society | Best Screenplay | 500 Days of Summer | Won |
| 2009 | Oklahoma Film Critics Circle | Best Screenplay - Original | 500 Days of Summer | Won |
| 2009 | Satellite Awards | Best Original Screenplay | 500 Days of Summer | Won |
| 2009 | Southeastern Film Critics Association | Best Original Screenplay | 500 Days of Summer | Won |
| 2009 | St. Louis Film Critics Association | Best Screenplay | 500 Days of Summer | Won |
| 2009 | Writers Guild of America | Best Original Screenplay | 500 Days of Summer | Nominated |
| 2013 | Alliance of Women Film Journalists | Best Adapted Screenplay | The Spectacular Now | Nominated |
| 2013 | Independent Spirit Awards | Best Screenplay | The Spectacular Now | Nominated |
| 2013 | Indiana Film Critics Association | Best Screenplay | The Spectacular Now | Nominated |
| 2013 | San Francisco Film Critics Circle | Best Adapted Screenplay | The Spectacular Now | Nominated |
| 2013 | St. Louis Film Critics Association | Best Adapted Screenplay | The Spectacular Now | Nominated |
| 2013 | Washington D.C. Area Film Critics Association | Best Adapted Screenplay | The Spectacular Now | Nominated |
| 2017 | Academy Awards | Best Adapted Screenplay | The Disaster Artist | Nominated |
| 2017 | Writers Guild of America | Best Adapted Screenplay | The Disaster Artist | Nominated |
