= The Fault in Our Stars (film) =

2014 romantic drama film

- Theatrical release poster
- Directed by: Josh Boone
- Screenplay by: Scott Neustadter; Michael H. Weber
- Based on: The Fault in Our Stars by John Green
- Produced by: Wyck Godfrey; Marty Bowen
- Starring: Shailene Woodley; Ansel Elgort; Laura Dern; Sam Trammell; Nat Wolff; Willem Dafoe
- Cinematography: Ben Richardson
- Edited by: Robb Sullivan
- Music by: Mike Mogis; Nathaniel Walcott
- Production companies: Fox 2000 Pictures; Temple Hill Entertainment
- Distributed by: 20th Century Fox
- Release dates: May 16, 2014 (SIFF); June 6, 2014 (United States)
- Running time: 126 minutes
- Country: United States
- Language: English
- Budget: $12 million
- Box office: $307.2 million

The Fault in Our Stars is a 2014 American romantic drama film directed by Josh Boone from a screenplay by Scott Neustadter and Michael H. Weber, based on the 2012 novel of the same name by John Green. The film stars Shailene Woodley and Ansel Elgort, with Laura Dern, Sam Trammell, Nat Wolff, and Willem Dafoe in supporting roles. The story centers on a 16-year-old cancer patient, played by Woodley, forced by her parents to attend a support group, where she meets and subsequently falls in love with another cancer patient, played by Elgort.

Development began in January 2012 when Fox 2000 Pictures optioned the film adaptation rights to adapt the novel into a feature film. Principal photography began on August 26, 2013, in Pittsburgh, with a few additional days in Amsterdam, The Netherlands, before concluding on October 16. Pittsburgh doubled for all of the scenes set in Indianapolis, Indiana, the novel's setting, as well as for some interior scenes set in Amsterdam.

The Fault in Our Stars had its premiere at the Seattle International Film Festival on May 16, 2014, and was released in the United States on June 6 by 20th Century Fox to favorable reviews, with praise being given to Woodley's and Elgort's performances and chemistry together, as well as the screenplay. The film opened at number one at the box office during its opening weekend and grossed $307.2 million worldwide against a production budget of $12 million. It was released on DVD and Blu-ray on September 16, 2014, and earned $45 million in total domestic video sales.

== Plot ==
Indianapolis teenager Hazel Grace Lancaster is living with thyroid cancer that has spread to her lungs. Believing she is depressed, her mother urges her to attend a weekly cancer patient support group.

There, Hazel meets Augustus "Gus" Waters who is at the support group for his friend Isaac, who has eye cancer. Gus lost a leg to bone cancer, which has since gone into remission.

Hazel and Gus bond over their hobbies and agree to read each other's favorite books. He gives her The Price of Dawn, while she recommends An Imperial Affliction, a novel about a cancer-stricken girl named Anna that parallels Hazel's own experience, but has an abrupt ending. Its author, Peter Van Houten, retreated to Amsterdam following the novel's publication and has not been heard from since.

Weeks later, Gus tells Hazel he has tracked down Van Houten's assistant, Lidewij, and has been corresponding with Van Houten via email. He will only willingly answer their questions in person. Gus then surprises Hazel with tickets to Amsterdam, acquired from a wish charity organization. After a medical setback, Hazel's doctors eventually allow the trip.

Hazel and Gus arrive in Amsterdam, where he declares his love for her during a romantic meal sponsored by Van Houten. The following afternoon they go to his house, but are shocked to discover he is a mean-spirited alcoholic. It is revealed that the emails from Van Houten had actually come from Lidewij, who arranged the meeting without Van Houten's knowledge. He taunts Hazel for seeking serious answers to a piece of fiction and belittles her medical condition.

Distraught, the teens leave the residence, but Lidewij follows after them and invites them to go sightseeing to compensate for their ruined experience. The three of them visit the Anne Frank House, where Hazel and Gus share their first kiss. They return to Augustus' hotel room, where they have sex. The next day, Gus reveals to Hazel that his cancer has returned and metastasized, so is now terminal.

After their return to Indianapolis, Gus' health continues to deteriorate. Gus invites Hazel and Isaac to his "pre-funeral" so that they can both deliver their prepared eulogies, during which she tells him she would not trade their short time together for anything. Gus dies eight days later.

At his funeral, Van Houten arrives and reveals that Gus had demanded that he attend the funeral. He apologizes for his hostile treatment of them and explains that An Imperial Affliction was inspired by his own daughter, Anna, who died from leukemia at a young age.

The author gives Hazel a piece of paper, which she initially crumples up and discards in the car. She later retrieves it after Isaac reveals that it was a letter from Gus, who had asked for Van Houten's assistance in writing a eulogy for Hazel.

Hazel reads the letter, in which Gus accepts his fate and professes his love for her. As she finishes the letter, she lies on her back on the lawn in her backyard and looks up at the stars, smiling.

== Cast ==
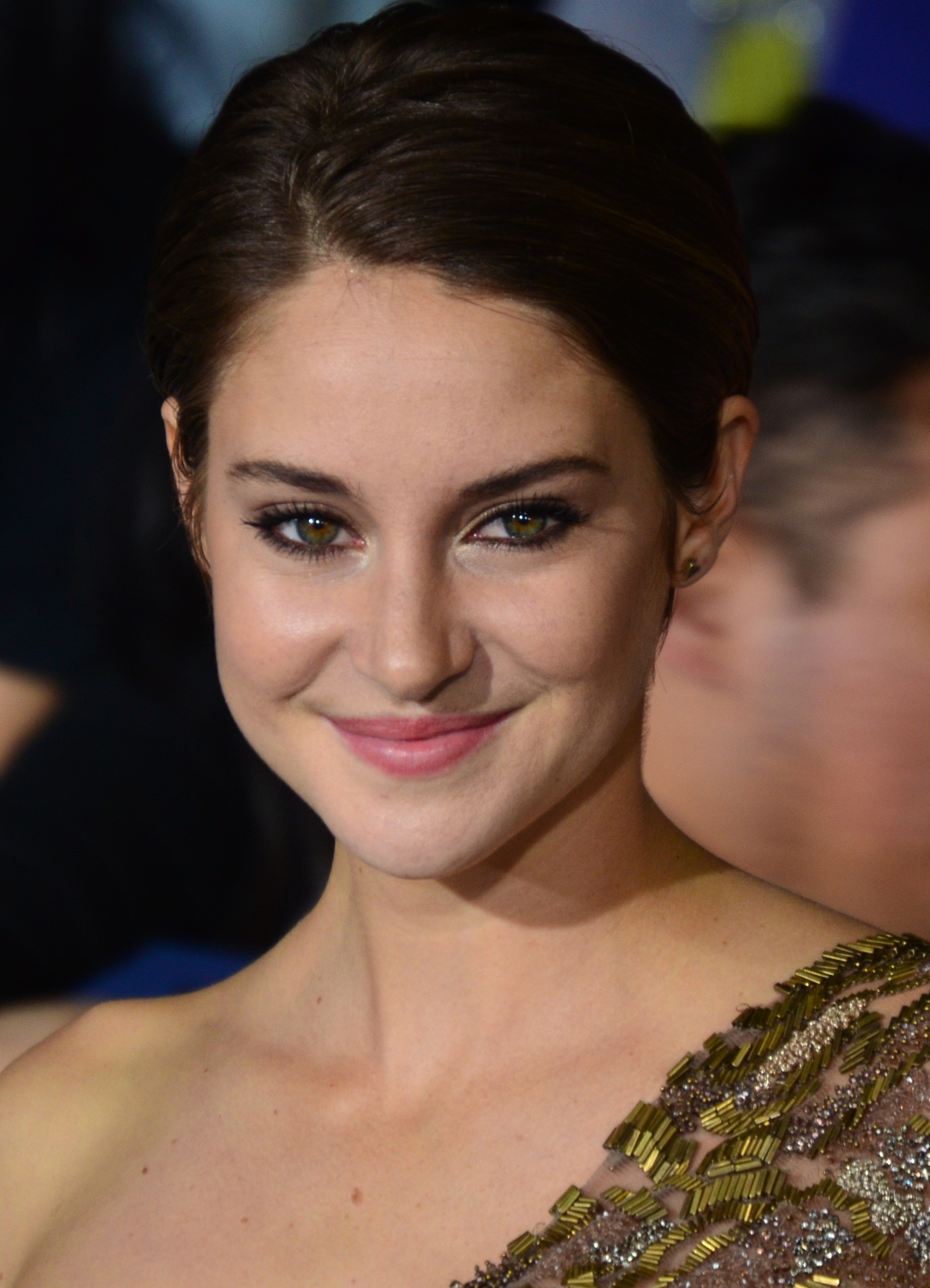
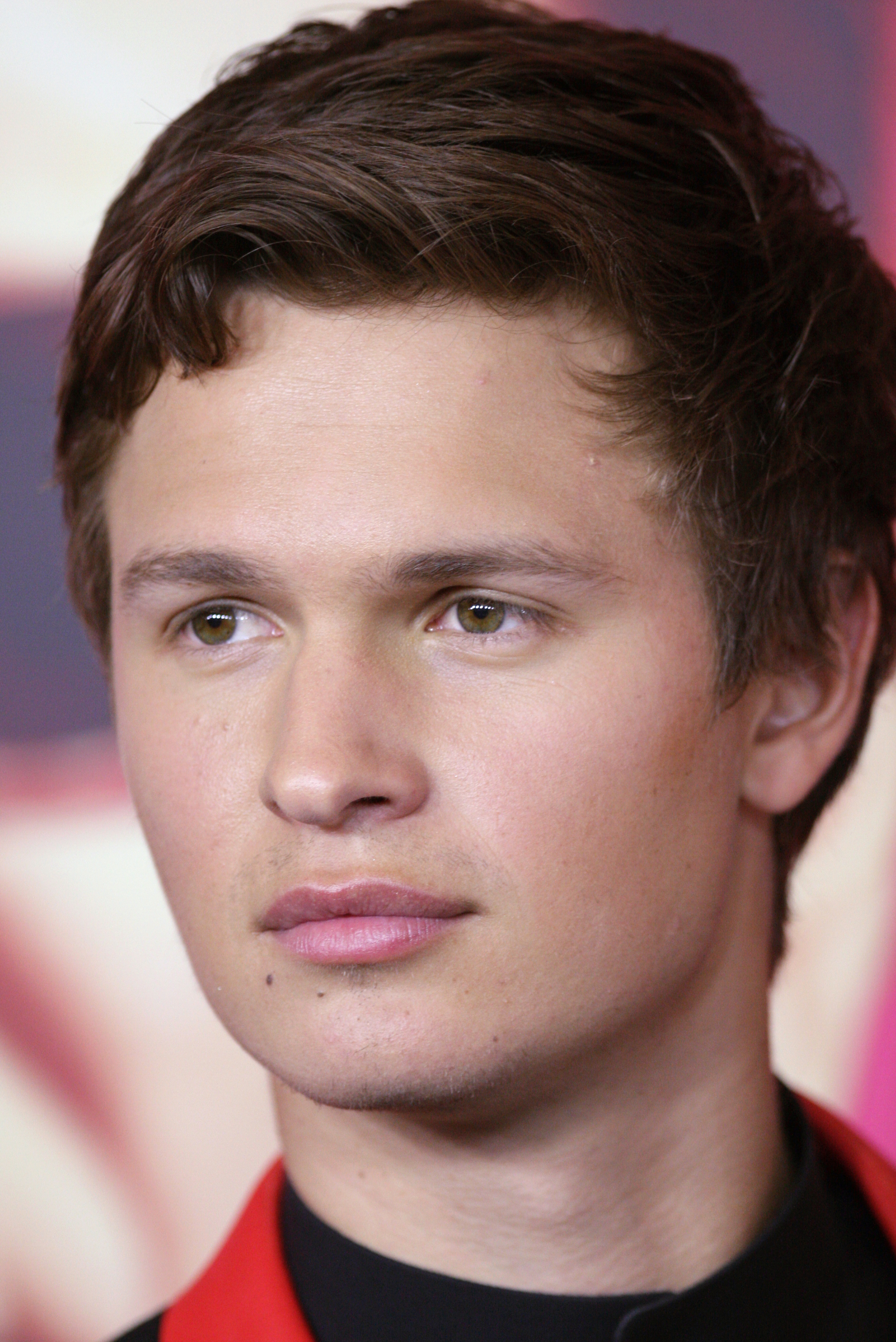
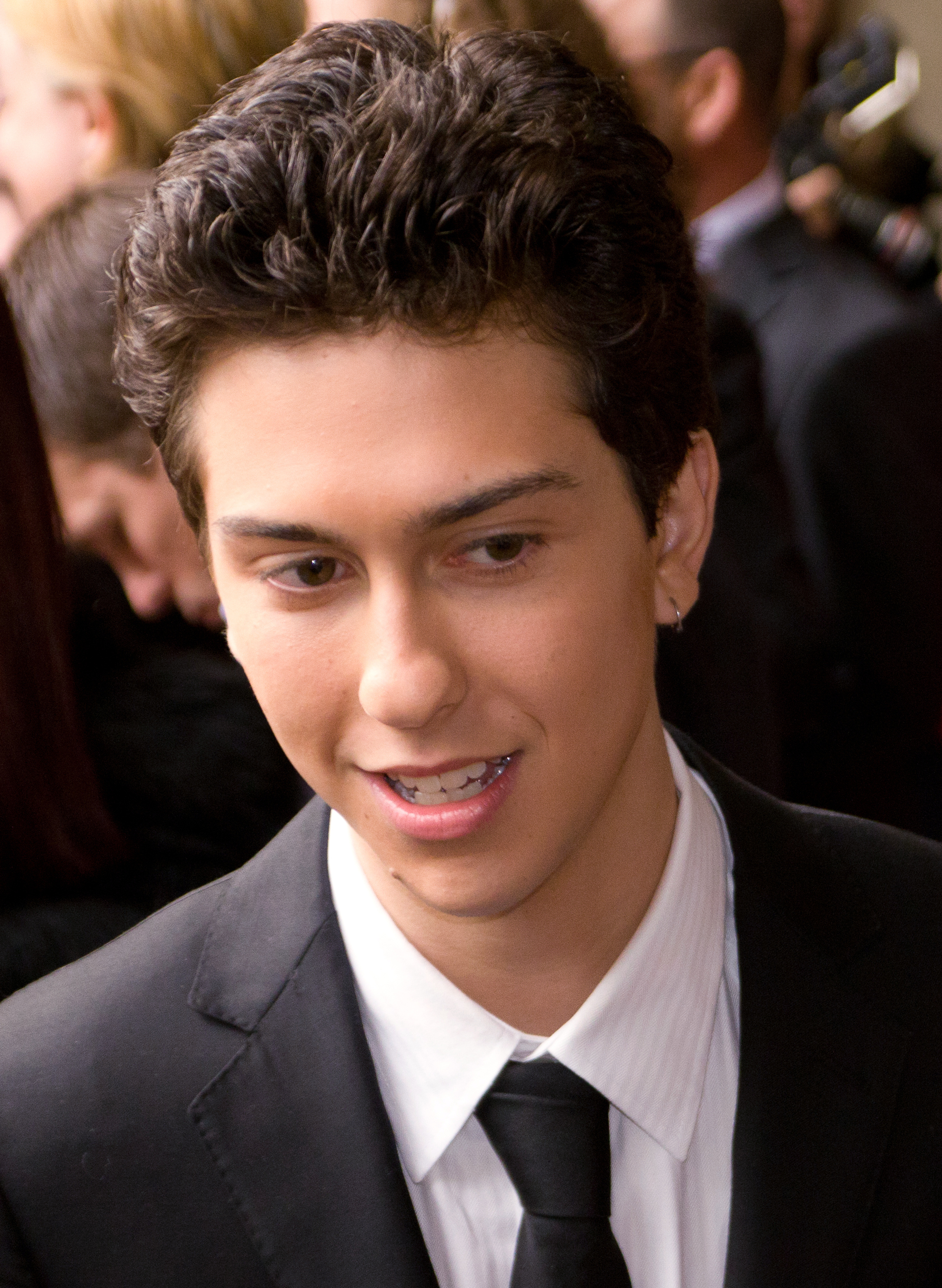
Top to bottom: The film stars Shailene Woodley as Hazel Grace Lancaster, Ansel Elgort as Augustus Waters, and Nat Wolff as Isaac.
- Shailene Woodley as Hazel Grace Lancaster
  - Lily Kenna as young Hazel
- Ansel Elgort as Augustus "Gus" Waters
- Nat Wolff as Isaac, Augustus' best friend
- Laura Dern as Frannie Lancaster, Hazel's mother
- Sam Trammell as Michael Lancaster, Hazel's father
- Willem Dafoe as Peter Van Houten
- Lotte Verbeek as Lidewij Vliegenthart, Van Houten's assistant
- Mike Birbiglia as Patrick, the support group leader
- Ana Dela Cruz as Dr. Maria
- Milica Govich as Mrs. Waters, Augustus's mother
- David Whalen as Mr. Waters, Augustus's father
- Emily Peachey as Monica
- Emily Bach as Monica's Mom
- Carole Weyers as the voice of Anne Frank

== Production ==
=== Pre-production ===
On January 31, 2012, it was announced that Fox 2000 Pictures, a division of 20th Century Fox, had optioned the rights to adapt John Green's novel The Fault in Our Stars for a feature film. Wyck Godfrey and Marty Bowen were due to produce the film with their production company, Temple Hill Entertainment. Stephen Chbosky, who directed The Perks of Being a Wallflower (also filmed in Pittsburgh), was in talks to direct the film but turned it down because of its similarity to Perks. On February 19, 2013, Josh Boone was hired as director; Scott Neustadter and Michael H. Weber were hired to adapt the novel into a screenplay—their second adaptation for Fox, following Rosaline, though Rosaline did not release until 2022.

=== Casting ===
On March 19, 2013, director Josh Boone announced that Shailene Woodley would play Hazel Grace Lancaster. Director Josh Boone said, "We read close to 150 actresses for the role, and I saw about 50 of those. Within ten or fifteen seconds of Shailene's audition, I knew she was Hazel. She held up her script pages and just her eyes were peeking over them." On May 10, 2013, Ansel Elgort was cast as Hazel's love interest, Augustus Waters. On July 23, Laura Dern was cast as Hazel's mother Frannie Lancaster, and Nat Wolff as Isaac, Augustus' best friend. Wolff told HuffPost Live, "It's exciting, I feel really lucky. The fact that I get to work with these super talented people—I mean, that's part of the reason why, I'm good in the movie, that's the reason." On August 14, Sam Trammell was cast as Hazel's father Michael Lancaster, and on August 28, author John Green announced that Mike Birbiglia would be playing Patrick. On September 6, Green announced that Willem Dafoe would play Peter van Houten.

Prior to these announcements, author John Green said he would be happy if Mae Whitman played Hazel, and in February 2013, there had been speculation that Shailene Woodley and Hailee Steinfeld were among those being considered for the lead role.

John Green filmed a cameo appearance; his scene was cut from the film but is included in the deleted scenes section of the film's DVD and Blu-ray releases. In the cut scene, Green plays the father of a young girl who asks about Hazel's cannula while at the airport. Green said, "They cut [the scene] because it was totally unnecessary to the movie-slash-I was terrible."

=== Filming ===
Principal photography began on August 26, 2013, in Pittsburgh, Pennsylvania. Film locations included Oakmont, Pennsylvania, UPMC Children's Hospital of Pittsburgh, and the historic The Mansions on Fifth hotel. The church scenes were filmed at St. Paul's Episcopal Church in the Pittsburgh suburb of Mt. Lebanon. Filming in Pennsylvania continued until October 10; then the production moved to Amsterdam, where filming began on October 14. Filming was officially completed on October 16, 2013.

In Amsterdam, three days of filming took place. Woodley and Elgort were filmed on a canal-side public bench. On July 2, 2014, The Guardian reported that the bench had gone missing, and city officials said they did not know where it was. Amsterdam city spokesman Stephan van der Hoek said, "It's a bit embarrassing, because we do keep good track of them, but it's gone all right". He promised to install a new bench within weeks. A week later, the Amsterdam film office had posted a photograph taken during the re-installation of the stolen bench, and Amsterdam film commissioner Simon Brester stated that it was the same bench, not a replacement.

Filming in Pittsburgh included the interior scenes at the Anne Frank House, which was recreated on a soundstage at Pittsburgh Studios located in Churchill, Pennsylvania, in the east suburbs of Pittsburgh. Production designer Molly Hughes and art director Greg Weimerskirch built three different studio sets in Pittsburgh, one for each floor. Also, the Funky Bones art monument in Indianapolis was recreated in Pittsburgh with the help of the sculpture's creator, Dutch artist Joep van Lieshout.

Author John Green, though an Indianapolis native, was pleased with the selection of Pittsburgh for filming. He commented that

Pittsburgh has an amazing community of really talented film professionals that's been built up over the last 20 years. I've been blown away by their professionalism, their confidence, their dedication. There aren't a lot of cities like that. You kind of have to find the city that can be Indianapolis. And Pittsburgh, even though it has a lot of hills, it can be Indianapolis. We just have to find a couple of flat streets.

=== Music ===
Mike Mogis and Nathaniel Walcott of Bright Eyes scored the film. The full album track list was released on April 13, 2014, featuring songs from artists including: M83, Grouplove, Kodaline, Jake Bugg, Tom Odell, Birdy, Ed Sheeran and Charli XCX, who performed "Boom Clap", one of the main songs from the movie, which became an international success, due in part to its exposure in the film. The soundtrack was released by Atlantic Records on May 19 in the U.S., and on June 23 in the UK.

== Release ==
The Fault in Our Stars premiered to 300 guests at the Ziegfeld Theater in New York City on June 2, 2014. At the premiere, Green said: "I didn't want to sell it, because Hollywood sucks at making unsentimental movies about illness." The film was released on June 6, 2014.

After the New York premiere, Evangeline Earl, a student, announced that Green's book, from which the film was adapted, had been inspired by her sister Esther Earl, who had also been an author. Esther had thyroid cancer and died in 2010. Evangeline said Esther had met Green at LeakyCon, a Harry Potter convention held in Boston in 2009. Green said, "I could never have written The Fault in Our Stars without knowing Esther. Every word on that book depends on her." Green said he used the word "okay" in the book and the film because Hazel and Augustus used it to express their love for each other.

=== Marketing ===
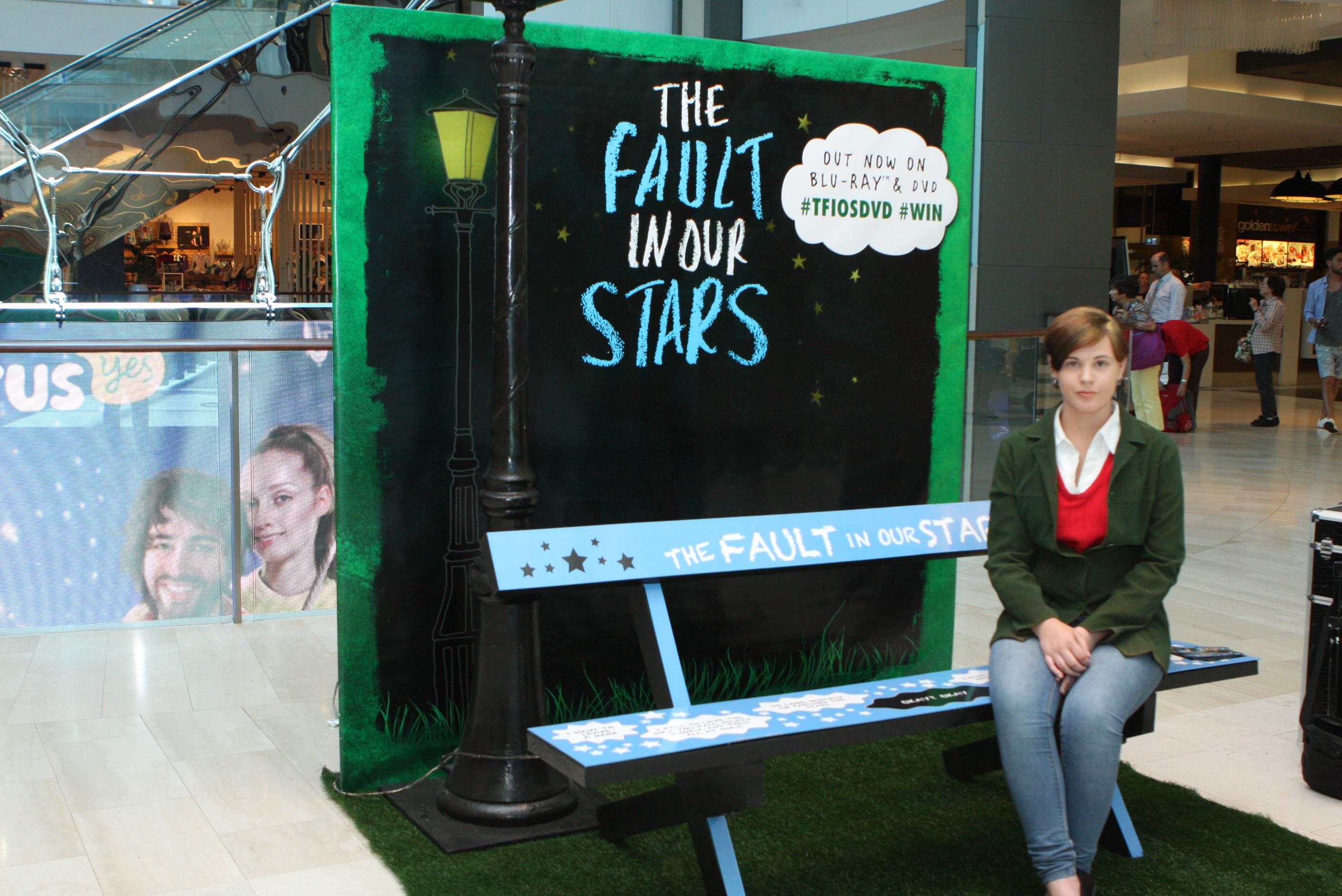
Movie promotion in a commercial center in Bondi Beach, Sydney

The first trailer was released on January 29, 2014. The trailer had over 3 million views in less than 24 hours, and more than 15 million views in its first seven days. A video clip was shown before the show at the 2014 MTV Movie Awards on April 13. An extended trailer was released on April 28, and Fox released more clips via YouTube as part of the film's pre-release promotion. On April 2, the studio announced the launch of a promotional tour program named Demand Our Stars. Green, Woodley, Elgort, and Wolff would visit the states that got most votes from fans re-blogging their states' map outlines. Four states won: the tour program started in Miami, Florida, on May 6; went to Cleveland, Ohio, on May 7; then went to Nashville, Tennessee, on May 8; and ended in Dallas, Texas, on May 9.

=== Home media ===
The Fault in Our Stars was released on DVD and Blu-ray on September 16, 2014. The Fault in Our Stars: Little Infinities Blu-ray edition features the theatrical 126-minute and extended 133-minute versions of the film, a number of deleted scenes including the John Green cameo, and featurettes. The home video release grossed $45 million in total domestic video sales. It became available to stream on Disney+ on September 24, 2021.

== Reception ==
=== Critical response ===
On review aggregator Rotten Tomatoes, the film has an approval rating of 81% based on 224 reviews, with an average rating of 6.90/10. The site's critical consensus reads, "Wise, funny, and heartbreaking without resorting to exploitation, The Fault in Our Stars does right by its bestselling source material." Metacritic gave the film a score of 69 out of 100, based on 45 critics, indicating "generally favorable reviews". Opening day audiences polled by CinemaScore gave the film an "A" on an A+ to F scale.

Steven Rea of The Philadelphia Inquirer gave the film a score of 3 out of 4; he said, "Woodley ... balances grace with gravity, wit with heart." A. O. Scott writing for The New York Times said, "The film sets out to make you weep—not just sniffle or choke up a little, but sob until your nose runs and your face turns blotchy. It succeeds." The Boston Globe's Ty Burr gave the film a rating of 2.5 out 4 and said, "If Elgort's Gus is glibly charming and ultimately affecting, The Fault in Our Stars belongs to Woodley, a performer who always seems to be backing warily into her own movies."

Quickflix's Simon Miraudo rated the film 3 out of 5 and said, "The Fault in Our Stars undeniably sets us up to knock us down." Richard Roeper of Chicago Sun-Times gave the film 4 stars. He said Woodley's performance as Hazel was "transcendent, pure and authentic", stating that, "she's that memorable." Scott Mendelson of Forbes magazine said the film is "exceptionally high-quality mainstream entertainment" and called it "a genuine work of art." Anna Smith of Empire said it was a, "touching romance and Shailene Woodley's best performance yet." Emma Dibdin of Digital Spy wrote "The Fault in Our Stars is a sharp and emotionally-sophisticated weepie that imbues its teenage characters with rare intelligence, and tackles its bleak subject matter with acerbic wit and tenderness." Wilson Morales at BlackFilm.com praised Woodley and Elgort's performances, saying they "are so captivating and genuine in their performances, they manage to make this intensely poignant film very moving, romantic and highly entertaining."

Time magazine's Richard Corliss wrote, "Hazel and Augustus will live in film lore because of the young actors who play them." Chris Vongar of Dallas Morning News gave the film a B+ as "the movie is witty and alive and only very occasionally maudlin." USA Today's Claudia Puig called the film "well-written, well-acted, acerbic, funny and wisely observed", giving it 3.5 out of 4. Chris Nashawaty of Entertainment Weekly called the film a "funny, sweet, three-hankie tearjerker" and gave it a B grade on an A to F scale. Geoff Pevere of The Globe and Mail said, "While it may not conform to one's real-life expectations it certainly hews tightly to teen-flick conventions." Connie Ogle of The Miami Herald called it a, "sweet, romantic film full of sudden warmth and humor." A.A. Dowd of The A.V. Club gave the film a "B" saying that it is, "blessed with sparks of wit and buoyed by the talents of a charismatic cast."

Peter Bradshaw of The Guardian gave the film a negative review, likening it to "being mugged by a professional whose skills in mixed martial arts you can't help but notice and appreciate, even as you are savagely beaten, then dragged upright, bruised and bleeding, and forced to watch as your assailant gives fully 45% of your money to charity." Christy Lemire writing for Roger Ebert's website gave it two stars out of four and criticized the film for being "emotionally inert, despite its many moments that are meant to put a lump in our throats." Lemire criticized Elgort's performance and praised Woodley's "abiding, disarming naturalism." Robbie Collin writing for The Daily Telegraph said, "Gus is something of a manic pixie dreamboat: the lesser-spotted male version of the kooky, adoring girlfriend-type sometimes played by Kirsten Dunst, Natalie Portman, and Zooey Deschanel." David Edelstein of NPR said,

I know people who cried at the trailer of the romantic teen cancer movie The Fault in Our Stars—at the movie they'll need a life preserver to keep from drowning in a flood of tears. Me, I didn't cry, though at times my tear ducts tingled; I was on the verge. The film is a little slick for my taste, too engineered. But it's gently directed by Josh Boone and beautifully acted. Whatever the faults, it's not in the stars.

Shalini Langer of The Indian Express gave the film two and a half stars and said, "The film is faithful to a fault from the dialogues to the clothes, the setting and the food, even while skipping over some of the unpleasant details." Dana Stevens writing for Slate Magazine said, "What in the name of God is wrong with me that I didn't cry once—I, who just the day before wept through the entirety of my child's thoroughly upbeat school play." Two Christian reviewers and some theologians have mentioned the presence of Christian themes in the film. Writing for Catholic News Agency, Robert Barron said:

I don't think it is the least bit accidental that Waters (Gus's last name) and Grace (Hazel's middle name) met in the sacred heart of Christ and thereby, despite their shared suffering, managed to give life to one another ... [and so] Hazel effectively repudiates her nihilism and materialism as she responds across the barrier of death to Gus's 'okay.'" He also noted, "[Is] this film a satisfying presentation of Christianity? Hardly. But for those who are struggling to find their way to meaning and faith, it's not an entirely bad place to start."

The film's studio, 20th Century Fox, mounted an unsuccessful campaign to have Shailene Woodley nominated for the Academy Award for Best Actress, as well as the film's adapted screenplay.

=== Box office ===
The Fault in Our Stars earned $124.9 million in North America and $182.3 million in other countries for a worldwide total of $307.2 million, against a production budget of $12 million.

In North America, the film's income received a boost from "The Night Before Our Stars", a premium-priced event for which tickets sold for up to $25. The event included a screening of the film and a simulcast question-and-answer session with cast and crew, including Woodley, Elgort, Wolff, and Green. The film earned $8.2 million from Thursday-night showings and $26.1 million on its opening day. During its opening weekend, the film earned $48,002,573 from 3,173 theaters at an average of $15,128 per theater, making it number one in North America.

At locations outside North America, The Fault in Our Stars earned $16.59 million from 2,892 screens in 17 markets in its opening weekend, placing at number four behind Edge of Tomorrow ($81 million), Maleficent ($61.7 million), and X-Men: Days of Future Past ($41.1 million). Brazil, Mexico, and Australia generated the highest income with $5.8 million, $3.8 million, and $3.7 million respectively. The following week the film earned $16.1 million from 40 markets, remaining at number 4 again.

=== Accolades ===
| Award | Category | Recipient | Result |
|---|---|---|---|
| 15th Golden Trailer Awards | Best Romance | The Fault in Our Stars | Won |
| Golden Space Needle Award | Best Film | The Fault in Our Stars | Nominated |
| Teen Choice Awards 2014 | Choice Movie: Drama | The Fault in Our Stars | Won |
| Teen Choice Awards 2014 | Choice Movie Actor: Drama | Ansel Elgort | Won |
| Teen Choice Awards 2014 | Choice Movie Actress: Drama | Shailene Woodley | Won |
| Teen Choice Awards 2014 | Choice Movie: Breakout Star | Ansel Elgort | Won |
| Teen Choice Awards 2014 | Choice Movie: Scene Stealer | Nat Wolff | Won |
| Teen Choice Awards 2014 | Choice Movie: Chemistry | Ansel Elgort, Shailene Woodley, and Nat Wolff | Won |
| Teen Choice Awards 2014 | Choice Movie: Liplock | Ansel Elgort and Shailene Woodley | Won |
| Young Hollywood Awards | Fan Favorite Actor – Male | Ansel Elgort | Won |
| Young Hollywood Awards | Fan Favorite Actor – Female | Shailene Woodley | Nominated |
| Young Hollywood Awards | Breakthrough Actor | Ansel Elgort | Nominated |
| Young Hollywood Awards | Best On-Screen Couple | Ansel Elgort and Shailene Woodley | Won |
| Young Hollywood Awards | Best Cast Chemistry – Film | The Fault in Our Stars | Won |
| Young Hollywood Awards | Favorite Flick | The Fault in Our Stars | Won |
| Kid's Choice Awards Argentina | Favorite Movie | The Fault in Our Stars | Won |
| 18th Hollywood Film Awards | Hollywood Breakout Performance – Actress | Shailene Woodley | Won |
| 41st People's Choice Awards | Favorite Movie Duo | Shailene Woodley and Ansel Elgort | Nominated |
| 41st People's Choice Awards | Favorite Dramatic Movie Actress | Shailene Woodley | Nominated |
| 41st People's Choice Awards | Favorite Dramatic Movie | The Fault in Our Stars | Won |
| MTV Movie Awards | Movie of the Year | The Fault in Our Stars | Won |
| MTV Movie Awards | Best Male Performance | Ansel Elgort | Nominated |
| MTV Movie Awards | Best Female Performance | Shailene Woodley | Won |
| MTV Movie Awards | Breakthrough Performance | Ansel Elgort | Nominated |
| MTV Movie Awards | Best On-Screen Duo | Shailene Woodley and Ansel Elgort | Nominated |
| MTV Movie Awards | Best Shirtless Performance | Ansel Elgort | Nominated |
| MTV Movie Awards | Best Kiss | Ansel Elgort and Shailene Woodley | Won |

== Remake and similar film ==
=== Dil Bechara ===
On August 6, 2014, India's Fox Star Studios announced its intention to remake the film. In March 2018, actor Sushant Singh Rajput was announced as the male lead in the official Hindi remake of the film. The film also marks the directorial debut of former casting director Mukesh Chhabra. Oscar winner A.R. Rahman composed its music. Actress Sanjana Sanghi was announced as the female lead. The movie was released to Disney+ Hotstar on July 24, 2020.

=== A Little Red Flower ===
The 2020 Chinese film A Little Red Flower has been noted for having significant similarities to The Fault in Our Stars, which was never theatrically released in China. The Hollywood Reporter reported on January 13, 2021, that Fox had attempted to create a Chinese remake to The Fault in Our Stars in 2016, with the former president of Fox International Productions, Tomas Jegeus, confirming that a remake was indeed in development at the studio with Yin Lu and Han Yan producing and Yu Yonggan writing the film's script.

Shortly after, two official film notices announced that the remake was in the works, but after the acquisition of 21st Century Fox by Disney, the studio decided to drop the film in 2018 to work on Dil Bechara. In 2018, a notice was released by the China Film Administration for a project titled Hopeless in Love, which would be produced by HG Entertainment and Lian Ray Pictures, with a premise similar to the original remake that had been in development. In 2020, A Little Red Flower was released from the same production companies, and with Yin Lu producing, Yu Yonggan co-writing, and Han Yan directing, but with no credit or mentions to Fox. However, Han said that many of the scenes portrayed in the story were inspired by real-life events that he witnessed himself. Both Disney, who acquired Fox, and A Little Red Flower's co-producer Lian Ray have declined to comment on the matter.
