= Friends with Benefits (TV series) =

American romantic sitcom TV series

- Genre: Sitcom
- Created by: Scott Neustadter; Michael H. Weber
- Starring: Ryan Hansen; Danneel Harris; Jessica Lucas; Zach Cregger; Andre Holland
- Composer: Matter Music
- Country of origin: United States
- Original language: English
- No. of seasons: 1
- No. of episodes: 13 (1 aired online)

Production
- Executive producers: Brian Grazer; David Nevins; David Dobkin; Jeff Kleeman; Scott Neustadter; Michael H. Weber; Ira Ungerleider
- Camera setup: Single-camera
- Running time: 21 minutes
- Production companies: Imagine Television; Big Kid Pictures; Pickle Films; 20th Century Fox Television

Original release
- Network: NBC
- Release: August 5 – September 9, 2011

Friends with Benefits (stylized as friends ♥♥ith benefits) is an American romantic sitcom television series created by Scott Neustadter and Michael H. Weber that aired on NBC from August 5 to September 9, 2011. It was originally set to air on as a mid-season replacement during the 2010–11 television season, but was ultimately delayed until summer. The series ended after twelve episodes aired with the thirteenth being only available on iTunes, Amazon.com, and Netflix. The show is no longer available on any platform.

== Plot ==
The series follows a group of friends living in Chicago. It involves a very close friendship between two of the friends, who are each looking for the perfect mate, and the others who question their relationship, but at the same time, have their own romantic problems to deal with.

== Cast ==
- Ryan Hansen as Ben Lewis, an office drone who is in no rush to find the right girl for him. He has been sleeping with his friend, Sara.
- Danneel Harris as Sara Maxwell, an OB/GYN and Ben's closest friend. Unlike Ben, she is desperate to find the right guy.
- Jessica Lucas as Riley Elliot, a bartender and Sara's roommate. She is laid-back and lives a very casual love life.
- Zach Cregger as Aaron Greenway, a rich, nerdy engineer who wants to meet women but has trouble interacting with them.
- Andre Holland as Julian "Fitz" Fitzgerald, Aaron's roommate. He takes it upon himself to help Aaron with women and keep the group on good terms with each other.

== Production and development ==
Friends with Benefits was originally developed for ABC with a script order given by ABC in September 2009. However, ABC did not green-light a pilot for the potential series, allowing NBC to pick up the project. For the pilot episode, Fran Kranz was originally cast as Aaron, and Ian Reed Kesler portrayed Hoon (another version of Fitz). The series was officially picked up on May 16, 2010.

== Episodes ==
All episode titles (apart from the pilot episode) begin with the phrase "The Benefit of..."

No.	Title	Directed by	Written by	Original release date	Prod. code	U.S. viewers (millions)
1	"Pilot"	David Dobkin	Scott Neustadter & Michael H. Weber	August 5, 2011	1ASP79	2.34
Ben searches for a date to his sister's wedding.
2	"The Benefit of the Mute Button"	Michael Patrick Jann	Claudia Lonow	August 5, 2011	1ASP01	1.96
Ben and Sara hit pause to pursue their respective love interests.
3	"The Benefit of the Unspoken Dynamic"	Fred Savage	Daley Haggar	August 12, 2011	1ASP02	1.92
Aaron goes on a bender to cure his heartbreak. Anneliese van der Pol guest stars.
4	"The Benefit of Forgetting"	Jay Chandrasekhar	Owen Ellickson	August 12, 2011	1ASP03	1.75
Ben reaps the benefits of dating a girl with amnesia.
5	"The Benefit of the Right Track"	Joanna Kerns	Isaac Aptaker & Elizabeth Berger	August 19, 2011	1ASP07	1.98
Sara starts a "booty call" relationship with a paramedic without knowing it. Ben finds himself stuck in a serious relationship.
6	"The Benefit of Keeping Your Ego in Check"	Tricia Brock	Brian Keith Etheridge	August 19, 2011	1ASP09	1.54
Sara goes on a date with a nerdy guy. Ben is accused of sexual harassment.
7	"The Benefit of Mardi Gras"	David Rogers	Gene Hong	August 26, 2011	1ASP05	2.58
The whole gang has a wild Mardi Gras. Sara fights with her pregnant sister for a family ring. Aaron thinks that he slept with Riley.
8	"The Benefit of Mentors"	Rob Greenberg	Valerie Breiman	August 26, 2011	1ASP06	1.99
Aaron learns that his high school mentee is a porn star. Riley dates a doctor that Sara admires.
9	"The Benefit of Being Shallow"	Reginald Hudlin	Valerie Breiman	September 2, 2011	1ASP08	1.97
Sara dates a blind guy. Fitz is dating the daughter of Aaron's fling.
10	"The Benefit of Avoiding the Mindbanger"	John Putch	Isaac Aptaker & Elizabeth Berger	September 2, 2011	1ASP10	1.76
Ben tries to help Sara to end a bad relationship with an intervention, but he ends up in a similar situation. Rebecca Mader guest stars.
11	"The Benefit of Putting in the Work"	Eyal Gordin	Daley Haggar	September 9, 2011	1ASP11	2.28
Ben decides to start a business and asks Aaron for help. Sara dates a journalist with a small problem.
12	"The Benefit of Friends"	Ira Ungerleider	Owen Ellickson	September 9, 2011	1ASP12	1.90
Riley falls in love for the first time. Ben realizes that he has feelings for Sara.
13	"The Benefit of Full Disclosure"	Fred Savage	Isaac Aptaker & Elizabeth Berger	Unaired (Note: Only available on iTunes (prior to March 31, 2019), Netflix (prior to March 31, 2018), and Amazon.com (prior to July 31, 2019))	1ASP04	N/A
Sara and Ben go on a double date.

== Nielsen ratings ==
The show's first episode had a 0.7 rating in the 18-49 demographic with 2.34 million total viewers. As the series progressed it declined to a rating of 0.5 with 1.54 million viewers.
