= Our Souls at Night =

2017 film by Ritesh Batra

- Release poster
- Directed by: Ritesh Batra
- Screenplay by: Scott Neustadter; Michael H. Weber
- Based on: Our Souls at Night by Kent Haruf
- Produced by: Robert Redford; Finola Dwyer; Erin Simms; Ted Sarandos
- Starring: Robert Redford; Jane Fonda
- Cinematography: Stephen Goldblatt
- Edited by: John F. Lyons
- Music by: Elliot Goldenthal
- Production company: Wildwood Enterprises, Inc
- Distributed by: Netflix
- Release dates: September 1, 2017 (Venice); September 29, 2017 (United States)
- Running time: 101 minutes
- Country: United States
- Language: English

Our Souls at Night is a 2017 American romantic drama film directed by Ritesh Batra from a screenplay by Scott Neustadter and Michael H. Weber, based on the 2015 novel by Kent Haruf. The film stars Robert Redford, Jane Fonda, Matthias Schoenaerts, and Judy Greer. It marked the final collaboration between Fonda and Redford, who had previously co-starred in The Chase, Barefoot in the Park, and The Electric Horseman. (Redford also had an uncredited role as a basketball player in Tall Story, Fonda's first film.)

Our Souls at Night had its world premiere at the 74th Venice International Film Festival on September 1, 2017. It was released simultaneously in select theaters in the United States and on Netflix on September 29, 2017. The film received acclaim from critics, who appreciated the film's direction, adaptation from the novel, and performances (especially Fonda's). Critics generally praised the casting of Fonda and Redford and their chemistry together.

== Plot ==
Set in the fictitious small Colorado city of Holt, widower Louis Waters and widow Addie Moore have been neighbors for decades but hardly know each other. One evening, Addie visits Louis and proposes they spend their nights together, not necessarily sexually, to counter their loneliness and help them sleep. Although Louis is initially somewhat taken aback, he asks for time to think about it.

A short time later, after Louis meets up in town with other like-aged men who regularly negatively gossip about people in town, he soon calls Addie and agrees. Initially, they interact awkwardly, as he admits he talks little. They start spending their evenings and nights at Addie's.

As they get to know each other, Addie suggests that Louis leave a few things at her place, like pajamas. When she also encourages him to come to the front door, he expresses concern that people might talk about them. Addie insists she does not worry about gossip.

Louis' daughter Holly calls the house, just as he arrives home one morning. She expresses concern, as she had called a few times in the evening. Saying he must not have heard her, when Holly suggests he get hearing aids, Louis jokingly feigns he cannot hear her.

The next time Louis comes over, Addie insists he enter through the front door, which their neighbors see. She asks for details about the affair he had years ago that everyone in town knows about. Louis explains that, when his marriage was doing poorly, he and teacher Tamara connected at school. He left his wife Diane and Holly to move in with her and her daughter. After a brief time, Louis had a change of heart and returned home.

Once Louis' group of friends spread the rumors about them, Louis suggests they rip off the band-aid. On Sunday, they go downtown together for lunch. After initially being greeted by several people, soon they blend in with everyone else.

At the start of the summer, Addie's son Gene drops off his son Jamie at Addie's house, as his marriage has fallen apart. Jamie spends the entire summer with Addie, regularly seeing Louis, and the two adults adopt a dog for the boy. Addie and Louis take Jamie camping in the mountains, where Louis teaches the boy to play catch and they roast marshmallows.

On their return, as it is the end of the summer, Gene is there to pick up Jamie. He confronts Addie about her relationship with Louis, which he disapproves of because he knows of his past extramarital affair. However, she refuses to break off with him.

Louis suggests they go together to a Denver hotel together once they are again alone. After an evening of dining and dancing, Addie and he are finally physically intimate. Back in their town, Holly has dinner with them to tell Louis of her impending trip to Italy.

Sometime later, Addie is hospitalized after a fall. Gene attempts to persuade her to move in with him, which she initially refuses. However, when Addie receives a distressed phone call from Jamie in the middle of the night, she reconsiders.

When Addie and Louis arrive at Gene's house, they find Jamie alone. Later, her son comes home drunk. He confesses that he has always believed she blamed him for his sister Connie's death as kids, as afterwards she could not look him in the eye. Addie decides family must come first, so agrees to move in with Gene and Jamie. She and Louis spend their last night together. After that, they both are back to sleeping alone.

Louis sends the electric train set to Jamie and a cell phone for Addie. After getting into bed, she calls him and they start talking as old friends.

== Cast ==
- Robert Redford as Louis Waters
- Jane Fonda as Addie Moore
- Iain Armitage as Jamie Moore, Gene's son and Addie's grandson
- Matthias Schoenaerts as Gene Moore, Addie's son and Jamie's father
- Judy Greer as Holly Waters, Louis' daughter
- Phyllis Somerville as Ruth Joyce, Addie's friend
- Bruce Dern as Dorlan Becker
- Frederick "Fred' White Osborne as the table patron at the Brown Hotel

== Production ==
On July 7, 2016, Netflix hired Ritesh Batra to direct the film adaptation of Kent Haruf's 2015 novel Our Souls at Night, scripted by Scott Neustadter and Michael H. Weber.

Principal photography on the film began on September 12, 2016, in Colorado Springs, Colorado, and it also was shot in Florence, Colorado. Filming was completed on November 2, 2016.

== Release ==
Our Souls at Night had its world premiere at the 74th Venice International Film Festival on September 1, 2017. It was released simultaneously in select theaters in the United States and on Netflix on September 29, 2017.

The film's release in the United Kingdom attracted some commentary from critics and media observers because the first two words of the title sound (when read aloud) like "arseholes", an obscenity in British vernacular, equating to "assholes". This led to calls on Netflix to change the title of the film for its UK release; Netflix responded that it had no intention of retitling the film.

== Reception ==
On the review aggregator website Rotten Tomatoes, the film holds an approval rating of 89% based on 45 reviews, with an average rating of 7.5/10. The website's critical consensus reads, "Our Souls at Night honors the quiet strength of its source material by offering a simple yet sturdy canvas for two talented veteran leads to bring its story to life." Metacritic assigned the film a weighted average score of 69 out of 100 based on 15 critics, indicating "generally favorables" review.
