= 500 Days of Summer =

2009 film directed by Marc Webb

(500) Days of Summer
- Theatrical release poster
- Directed by: Marc Webb
- Written by: Scott Neustadter; Michael H. Weber
- Produced by: Mason Novick; Jessica Tuchinsky; Mark Waters; Steven J. Wolfe; Scott G. Hyman
- Starring: Joseph Gordon-Levitt; Zooey Deschanel
- Cinematography: Eric Steelberg
- Edited by: Alan Edward Bell
- Music by: Mychael Danna; Rob Simonsen
- Production company: Dune Entertainment
- Distributed by: Fox Searchlight Pictures
- Release dates: January 17, 2009 (Sundance); August 7, 2009 (United States)
- Running time: 95 minutes
- Country: United States
- Language: English
- Budget: $7.5 million
- Box office: $60 million

(500) Days of Summer is a 2009 American romantic comedy-drama film directed by Marc Webb in his feature directorial debut, written by Scott Neustadter and Michael H. Weber, and produced by Mark Waters. The film stars Joseph Gordon-Levitt and Zooey Deschanel as Tom and Summer respectively, and in a nonlinear narrative structure, Tom chronicles the story of his relationship with Summer.

As an independent production, the film was picked up for distribution by Fox Searchlight Pictures and premiered at the 25th Sundance Film Festival. It received positive reception from critics, earning $60.7 million in worldwide returns, far exceeding its $7.5 million budget. Many critics lauded the film as one of the best from 2009, and drew comparisons to other acclaimed films such as Annie Hall (1977) and High Fidelity (2000). The movie has since been recognized as a cult classic.

(500) Days of Summer received Best Original Screenplay and Best Screenplay awards at the 14th Satellite Awards and 25th Independent Spirit Awards, respectively, as well as two nominations at the 67th Golden Globe Awards: Best Motion Picture – Musical or Comedy and Best Actor – Musical or Comedy (Gordon-Levitt).

== Plot ==
Aspiring architect Tom Hansen works as a writer at a greeting card company in Los Angeles. He meets Summer Finn, his boss Vance's new assistant. They bond over their similar musical tastes, and at a company-sponsored karaoke night, they discuss love, which he believes in, unlike her, as her own parents had divorced. Tom's friend and co-worker drunkenly reveals that Tom likes Summer, which both assert is merely a close friendship. A few days later, Summer spontaneously kisses Tom in the office; Tom agrees to a casual relationship, and that night, they have sex. Over the first few months of their relationship, they grow closer.

Tom accompanies Summer to a park bench in the city, his favorite location. Eventually, Tom's friends and work colleagues as well as his adolescent half-sister Rachel urge him to ask Summer about their relationship status, but Summer insists it is unimportant as long as both parties are satisfied. One night, Tom brawls with a man who attempts to make sexual and romantic advances toward Summer in a bar. After an argument, they reconcile and Summer concedes that Tom deserves some certainty but cannot promise to always feel affection for him.

Slowly, their relationship becomes less passionate and they begin to continuously argue. After Summer quits her job at the greeting card company and ends things with Tom, citing their unhappiness, Vance transfers him to the consolations department, as his depression is making him unsuitable for happier events. A blind date with a woman named Alison fails, as Tom spends it complaining about Summer.

Months later, Tom is invited to attend the marriage of a work colleague named Millie and attempts to avoid Summer on the train heading to the occasion, but she notices him and invites him for coffee. At the ceremony, Summer catches the bouquet thrown by Millie, and dances with Tom at the wedding reception. After she invites him to a party at her apartment, he arrives, hoping to rekindle their romance, but notices her wearing an engagement ring and tearfully departs.

Sinking further into depression, Tom secludes himself in his apartment, only emerging for alcohol and junk food. After a few days, he returns to work heavily inebriated and emotionally quits his job on the spot. Rachel criticizes Tom's attitude, explaining that Summer was the wrong woman for him and that his depression stems from focusing solely on happy instances in the relationship. Tom finally reflects on the incompatibilities he'd overlooked. One day, he energetically rededicates himself to architecture, as Summer had encouraged him to do. He assembles a portfolio and secures job interviews.

Tom and Summer re-encounter each other at the park bench. She has recently married, and he admits his inability to comprehend it as she never wanted to be serious with anyone. She explains that when she met her now-husband, she was sure of him in a way she wasn't about Tom. When he acknowledges his shortcomings about believing in true love, she reassures him that his beliefs are justified, but stresses their own romantic incompatibility. He wishes her happiness as she departs.

On Wednesday, May 23 (day 500), Tom encounters a young woman who is interviewing for the same position at an architectural firm as him, and they connect over his favorite location. He invites her for coffee once both of them are finished with the interview. She declines, but then changes her mind, revealing that her name is Autumn, and so, the aforementioned counter resets to 1.

== Cast ==
- Joseph Gordon-Levitt as Tom Hansen, a trained architect who works as a writer at a greeting card company.
- Zooey Deschanel as Summer Finn, assistant to Tom's boss.
  - Olivia Bagg as Young Summer
- Geoffrey Arend as McKenzie, Tom's friend and co-worker at the greeting card company.
- Chloë Grace Moretz as Rachel Hansen, Tom's younger half-sister.
- Matthew Gray Gubler as Paul, one of Tom's friends.
- Clark Gregg as Vance, Tom's boss.
- Rachel Boston as Alison, Tom's blind date.
- Minka Kelly as Autumn
- Key Williams as Tommy Abraham
- Patricia Belcher as Millie
- Maile Flanagan as Rhoda
- Yvette Nicole Brown as Vance's New Secretary
- Richard McGonagle as Narrator

== Production ==
=== Writing ===
The film is presented as a non-linear narrative. Each scene is introduced using a title card showing which of the 500 days it is. Co-writer of the film Scott Neustadter admitted the film was based on a real romance. Neustadter explains that when he met the real girl who inspired the character Summer as a student at the London School of Economics in 2002, he was rebounding from a bad breakup back home, and promptly fell "crazily, madly, hopelessly in love" with the girl who "returned his kisses but not his ardor." The ending of the relationship was "painfully and unforgettably awful," which prompted him to co-write the film with Michael H. Weber. When Neustadter later showed the script to Summer's real-life counterpart, she said she related more to the Tom character. Weber also stated that, "we've all been in the trenches of love, we've all gone through the highs and lows, so Scott and I felt that the only way to tell this story was to come at it from a completely real place. It was pretty interesting for us because Scott was just going through a break-up and I was in a long-term relationship, so we each brought a totally opposite perspective, living it and not living it, and I think that tension helped to bring out more of the comedy". Director Marc Webb stated that he wrote Deschanel's character, Summer, based on a stock character type. Webb also described the film as more of a "coming of age" story as opposed to a "rom-com".

=== Filming locations ===
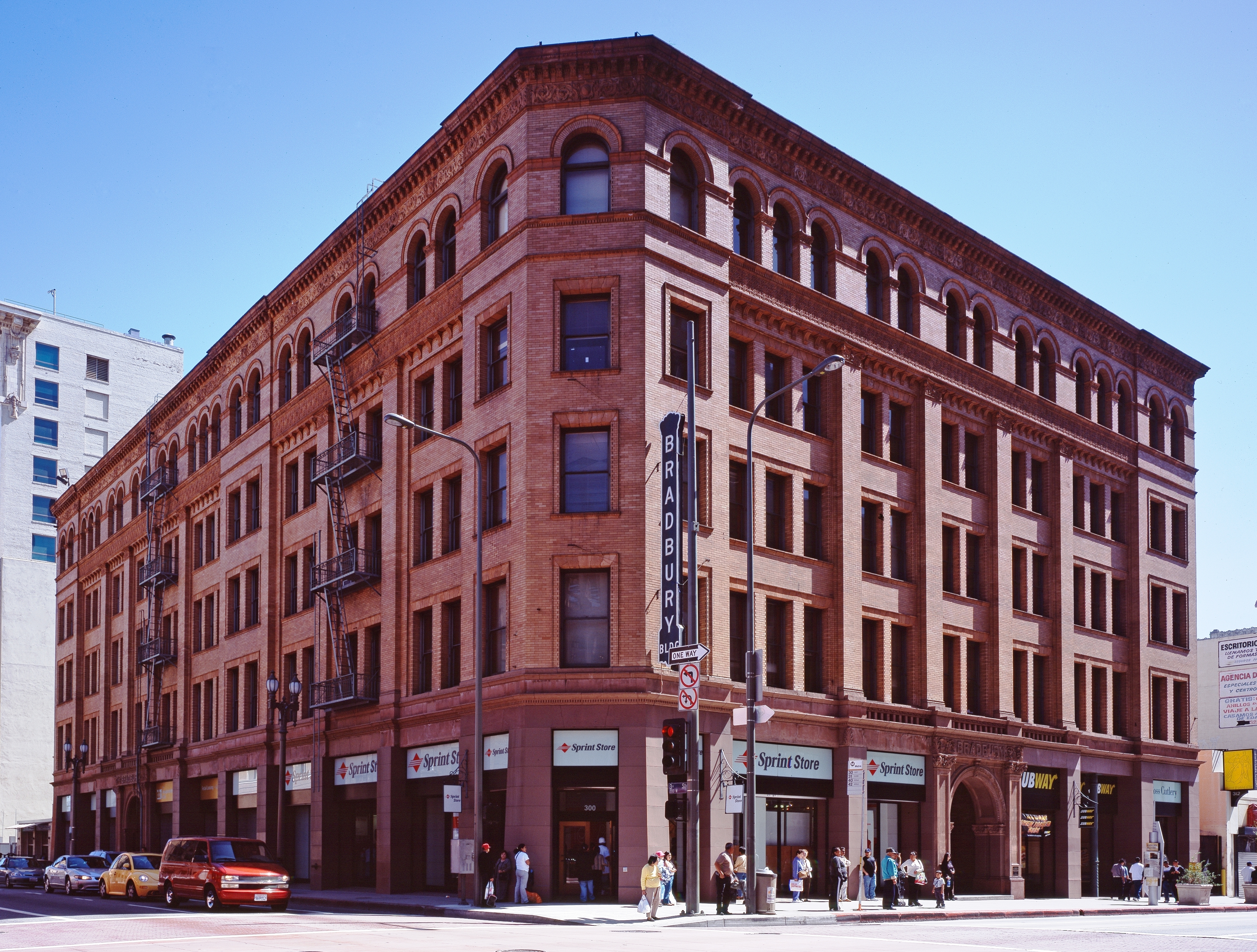
The Bradbury Building in Los Angeles was a filming location.

David Ng of the Los Angeles Times describes architecture as a star of the film. Tom is seen reading Alain de Botton's The Architecture of Happiness. The film was originally set in San Francisco but was later moved to Los Angeles and the script rewritten to make better use of the location. Buildings used include the Los Angeles Music Center (which includes the Dorothy Chandler Pavilion) and the towers of California Plaza. The older Fine Arts Building is featured in the film, in a scene where Tom shows it to Summer and mentions its designers, Walker and Eisen, two of his favorite architects. The Continental Building is also visible from Tom's bench at Angel's Knoll, and has become a notable symbol of the film. Christopher Hawthorne of the Los Angeles Times describes the film as having "finely honed sense of taste" to include the Bradbury Building where Tom goes for his job interview.

Tom's favorite spot in Los Angeles was shot at Angel's Knoll, which became a popular tourist attraction after the film's release. Since July 2013 it has been closed off to the public due to state cutbacks. In his article about cinematic cartography, Dr. Chris Lukinbeal suggests that the location of Angel's Knoll mirrors Tom's view of the world. He argues that Tom only perceives the beauty of the buildings surrounding them and only acknowledges the parking lot when Summer points it out to him. He states that "Tom is also unable to see beyond his expectations of hopeless romance." (500) Days of Summer became Webb's feature directorial debut.

=== Costume design ===
Costume designer, Hope Hanafin has revealed through interviews that Marc Webb insisted on the color blue being worn exclusively by Summer. He based his decision on Deschanel's eye color, but as Hanafin disclosed, it works on a subconscious level as well, attracting attention at all times. The only scene to break this "rule" is the Hall & Oates dance sequence where many of the extras appear in blue. "The point of that was to show that, in his morning-after glow, Tom's whole world is a reflection of Summer". The costumes are a mixture of vintage and fast fashion with the emphasis on staying realistic to what the characters could afford. Summer's wardrobe is refreshing and stylish without anything tying it to the years around the film's release which gives the aesthetics a timeless quality.

=== Soundtrack ===
Two soundtrack albums were released for (500) Days of Summer. The first, consisting of various pop songs from the film, was released through Sire Records and reached no. 42 on the Billboard 200 sales chart. Andrew Leahey of AllMusic rated the album three and a half stars out of five, saying "With music playing such an integral role in the story line, it's refreshing to see that the accompanying soundtrack does its job well, distilling the characters' record collections (not to mention the movie's quirky, nostalgic ambiance) into one eclectic track list." The second album consists of the film's musical score, composed by Mychael Danna and Rob Simonsen.

== Release ==
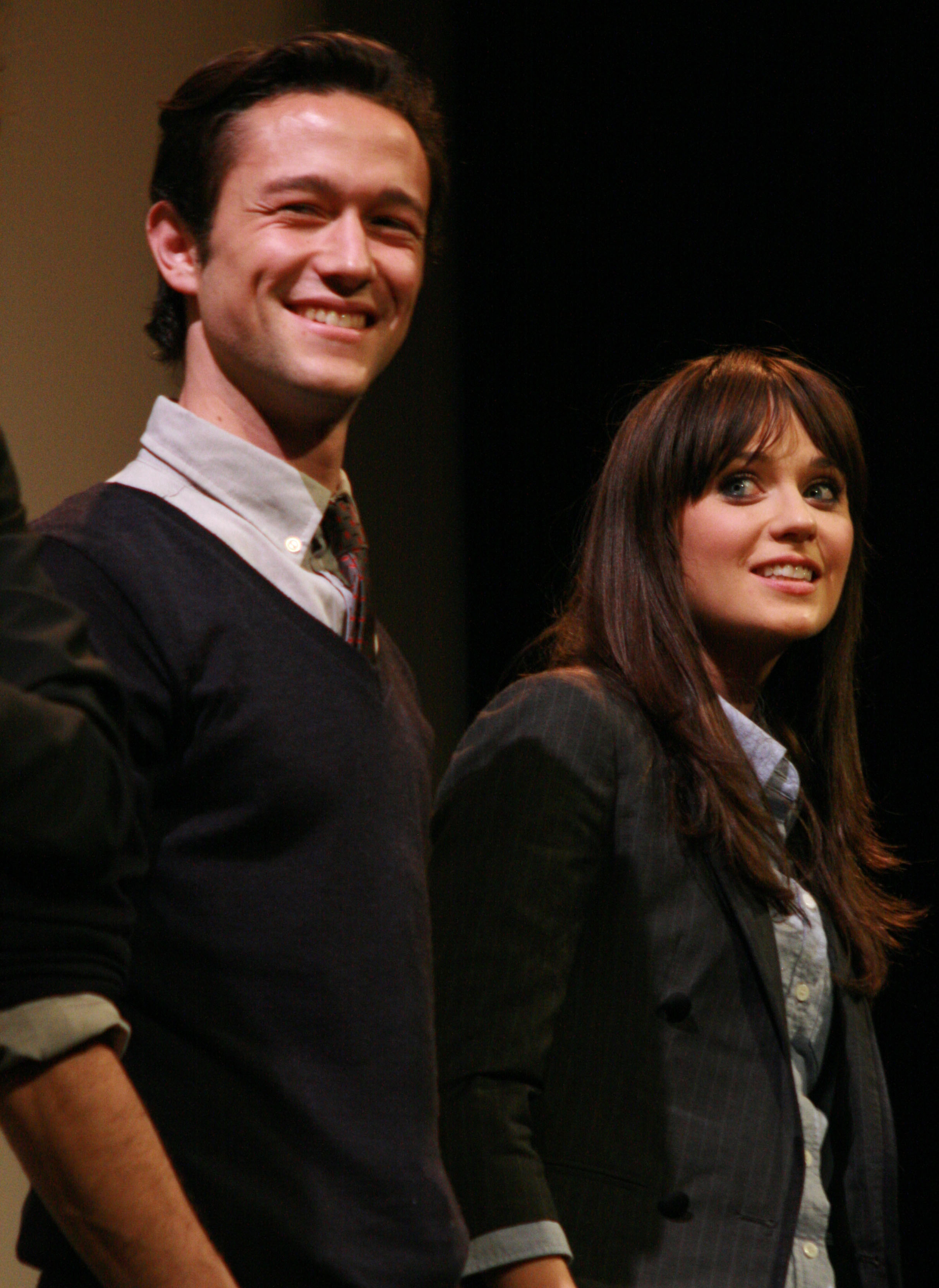
Joseph Gordon-Levitt and Zooey Deschanel at the film's premiere in March 2009

The film made its debut at the 25th Sundance Film Festival. It proved a huge success and received a standing ovation from festival crowds upon screening. In Europe, (500) Days of Summer premiered in Switzerland as the opening film of the 62nd Locarno Film Festival.

Filmed independently, it was picked up for distribution by Fox Searchlight Pictures and opened in the United States and Canada on July 17, 2009, later expanding to wide release on August 7, 2009. It was later also released on September 2, 2009, in Ireland and the United Kingdom, and opened in Australia on September 17, 2009.

=== Marketing ===
To help promote the film, Gordon-Levitt and Deschanel starred in the debut episode of Microsoft Zune and Mean Magazine's Cinemash series. In the episode, they "mash" the characters from the film Sid and Nancy with story elements from (500) Days of Summer.

Marc Webb created a music video as a companion piece to the film, titled "The Bank Heist". It features Deschanel and Gordon-Levitt dancing to "Why Do You Let Me Stay Here?", a song by Deschanel's folk group She & Him. Webb remarked, "when we didn't include Zooey in the dance sequence [in 500 Days], she was a little heartbroken and I felt like I needed to remedy that."

=== Box office ===
Upon the film's initial limited release in the U.S., it was expected to become the "breakout indie hit of the summer". By September 8, the film had taken in $1.9 million from 318 screens in the United Kingdom. This was regarded as a successful five-day opening by Fox Searchlight, earning around half as much as the science-fiction blockbuster District 9, which took in $3.5 million. The film ended up grossing $32.4 million in the United States and Canada and $60.7 million worldwide.

== Reception ==
On Rotten Tomatoes, the film has an approval rating of 86% based on 230 reviews, with an average rating of 7.4/10. The site's critical consensus reads, "A clever, offbeat romantic comedy, (500) Days of Summer is refreshingly honest and utterly charming." At the website's year-end "Golden Tomato Awards", which honored the best reviewed films of 2009, the film placed second in the romantic category. On Metacritic, the film has a weighted average score of 76 out of 100 based on 36 critics, indicating "generally favorable" reviews.

=== Critical response ===
Roger Ebert of the Chicago Sun-Times gave the film four stars out of four, describing the film as "a delightful comedy, alive with invention". He particularly praised the strong performances of Gordon-Levitt and Deschanel and summarized his review by adding, "Here is a rare movie that begins by telling us how it will end and is about how the hero has no idea why". Premiere also awarded the film four stars out of four, stating "Much like the actual summer (the season, not the character), we never wanted it to end".

Michael Ordoña of the Los Angeles Times wrote, "(500) Days of Summer is something seldom seen: an original romantic comedy. It bristles with energy, emotion and intellect, as it flits about the dizzying highs and weeping-karaoke lows of a passionate entanglement". Dana Stevens of Slate also praised the film and described it as "a keeper. It's fun both to watch and to talk about afterward, and it possesses the elusive rom-com sine qua non: two equally appealing leads who bounce wonderfully off each other".

Entertainment Weekly critic Owen Gleiberman gave the film an "A", and also praised the originality of the story; "Most romantic comedies have half a dozen situations at best: Meet Cute, Infatuation, Pop Song Montage, Contrived Mix-Up, Angry Breakup, and Final Clinch. (500) Days of Summer is about the many unclassifiable moments in between. It's a feat of star acting, and it helps make 500 Days not just bitter or sweet but everything in between". Film Threat critic Scott Knopf gave the film a maximum five stars, writing: "Of course they meet. Of course they fall for each other. Of course there are problems. It sounds cliché but what's remarkable about 500 Days is how the film explores new ways to tell the world's oldest story". He concluded that the film was "the best romantic comedy since Love Actually."

Peter Travers of Rolling Stone gave the film three and a half stars out of four. He wrote, "Boy meets girl, boy loses girl. It's been done to emo death. That's why the sublimely smart-sexy-joyful-sad (500) Days of Summer hits you like a blast of pure romantic oxygen" and concludes: "500 Days is otherwise a different kind of love story: an honest one that takes a piece out of you". USA Today's Claudia Puig wrote: "Much like Annie Hall did for a previous generation, (500) Days of Summer may be the movie that best captures a contemporary romantic sensibility."

IGN critic Eric Goldman gave the film 9 out of 10, and praised the film as "one of the best of 2009" and particularly complimented the innovative nature of the story in an often clichéd genre; "(500) Days of Summer proved there is a way to bring something fresh and new to one of the most cliché and often frustrating genres – the romantic comedy". A. O. Scott of The New York Times gave the film 4 out of 5 and called it "Slight, charming and refreshingly candid little picture."

Scott Tobias of The A.V. Club graded the film B−, criticizing it for its "dispiriting clichés," which make it "wind up in a no-man's land between Hollywood and something real." NPR was more dismissive: "For all its rhetorical whimsy and hipster dressings, (500) Days of Summer is a thoroughly conservative affair, as culturally and romantically status quo as any Jennifer Aniston vehicle."

Joe Morgenstern of The Wall Street Journal was also more critical, calling it, "synthetic and derivative, a movie that's popping with perceptions while searching for a style." British newspaper The Times gave a mixed review. Toby Young awarded the film three stars out of five, but conceded that "It is hardly the freshest romantic comedy of past 20 years. Taking the best bits from other movies and rearranging them in a non-linear sequence does not make for an original film." The Guardian film critic Peter Bradshaw said the film was "let down by sitcom clichés, and by being weirdly incurious about the inner life of its female lead."

Mark Adams of the Daily Mirror, though, gave the film a glowing review, awarding it five stars, and writing, "It is a modern romance for grown-ups... a sweet-natured, funny, deeply-romantic tale that brims with energy and is blessed with top-notch performances by Deschanel and Gordon-Levitt, who are both charming and have real chemistry". Empire gave the film 4 out of 5 stars, and wrote: "Perfectly played, simultaneously serious and light, endlessly inventive, this is a strong contender for the most original date movie of the year."

Since its release, the film has been considered a cult classic, and has been compared to other notable films such as Annie Hall (1977), and High Fidelity (2000). In 2025, it was one of the films voted for the "Readers' Choice" edition of The New York Times' list of "The 100 Best Movies of the 21st Century," finishing at number 230.

=== Top Ten lists ===
The film was also included in several "Top Ten" year-end lists for 2009 by various film critics.

Publication	Rank
St. Louis Post Dispatch	1
About.com	2
The Capital Times	2
BBC Radio 1	3
Richard Roeper	4
Miami Herald	5
Entertainment Weekly	6
USA Today	6
Associated Press	7
The Hollywood Reporter	7
New York Daily News	7
Premiere	7
Chicago Reader	8
Rolling Stone	9
National Board of Review	N/A

=== Cultural impact ===
In the Entertainment Weekly's interview of the 10th anniversary of the film's release, the lead actors, Joseph Gordon-Levitt and Zooey Deschanel, addressed its cultural impact and the viewers' frequent misconception of their characters, such as thinking Summer is a villain. Even though the film is told from Tom's point of view, "Summer is completely honest the entire movie." Gordon-Levitt repeatedly warned against sympathizing with his character Tom, who "develops a mildly delusional obsession over a girl onto whom he projects all these fantasies [...] That's falling in love with the idea of a person, not the actual person."

=== Accolades ===
Scott Neustadter and Michael H. Weber received numerous awards for their screenplay; including the 2009 Hollywood Film Festival's Hollywood Breakthrough Screenwriter Award on October 26, 2009, the Satellite Award for Best Original Screenplay, the Southeastern Film Critics Association Award for Best Original Screenplay (with the film also being named in the Top Ten Films of the Year), as well as the Las Vegas Film Critics Society Award for Best Screenplay.

Alan Edward Bell won the San Diego Film Critics Society Award for Best Editing, as well as the film being named one of the ten best movies of the year by the National Board of Review Awards 2009. The film also received two nominations at the 67th Golden Globe Awards announced on December 15, 2009, for Best Motion Picture – Musical or Comedy and for Joseph Gordon-Levitt for Best Actor – Musical or Comedy. It has been nominated for four Independent Spirit Awards and won the award for Best Screenplay.

Awards
Group	Category	Recipient(s)	Result
Chicago Film Critics Association	Most Promising Filmmaker	Marc Webb	Nominated
Critics' Choice Movie Awards	Best Comedy		Nominated
Critics' Choice Movie Awards	Best Original Screenplay	Scott Neustadter and Michael H. Weber	Nominated
Denver Film Critics Society	Best Original Screenplay	Scott Neustadter and Michael H. Weber	Nominated
Detroit Film Critics Society	Best Film		Nominated
Detroit Film Critics Society	Best Director	Marc Webb	Nominated
Detroit Film Critics Society	Best Actor	Joseph Gordon-Levitt	Nominated
Golden Globe Awards	Best Motion Picture – Musical or Comedy		Nominated
Golden Globe Awards	Best Actor – Motion Picture Musical or Comedy	Joseph Gordon-Levitt	Nominated
Hollywood Film Festival	Breakthrough Screenwriter	Scott Neustadter and Michael H. Weber	Won
Houston Film Critics Society	Best Picture		Nominated
Independent Spirit Award	Best Film		Nominated
Independent Spirit Award	Best Screenplay	Scott Neustadter and Michael H. Weber	Won
Independent Spirit Award	Best Male Lead	Joseph Gordon-Levitt	Nominated
Indiana Film Critics Association	Top 10 Films of the Year		
Las Vegas Film Critics Society	Best Screenplay	Scott Neustadter and Michael H. Weber	Won
National Board of Review	Top 10 Films of the Year		
National Board of Review	Best Directorial Debut	Marc Webb	Won
Oklahoma Film Critics Circle	Best Film		Nominated
Oklahoma Film Critics Circle	Best Original Screenplay	Scott Neustadter and Michael H. Weber	Won
People's Choice Award	Favorite Independent Movie		Nominated
San Diego Film Critics Society	Best Editing	Alan Edward Bell	Won
Satellite Award	Top 10 Films of the Year		
Satellite Award	Best Original Screenplay	Scott Neustadter and Michael H. Weber	Won
Satellite Award	Best Actress – Motion Picture Musical or Comedy	Zooey Deschanel	Nominated
Southeastern Film Critics Association	Top 10 Films of the Year		
Southeastern Film Critics Association	Best Original Screenplay	Scott Neustadler and Michael H. Weber	Won
St. Louis Gateway Film Critics Association	Best Picture		Nominated
St. Louis Gateway Film Critics Association	Best Comedy		Nominated
St. Louis Gateway Film Critics Association	Best Screenplay	Scott Neustadter and Michael H. Weber	Won
St. Louis Gateway Film Critics Association	Most Original, Innovative or Creative Film		Nominated
St. Louis Gateway Film Critics Association	Favorite Scene	'Expectations vs. reality' split-screen sequence	Nominated
St. Louis Gateway Film Critics Association	Favorite Scene	'Morning after' dance number	Nominated
Utah Film Critics Association	Best Screenplay	Scott Neustadter and Michael H. Weber	Nominated
Washington D.C. Area Film Critics Association	Best Original Screenplay	Scott Neustadter and Michael H. Weber	Nominated
Writers Guild of America	Best Original Screenplay	Scott Neustadter and Michael H. Weber	Nominated
