= The Tie That Binds (novel) =

1984 novel by Kent Haruf

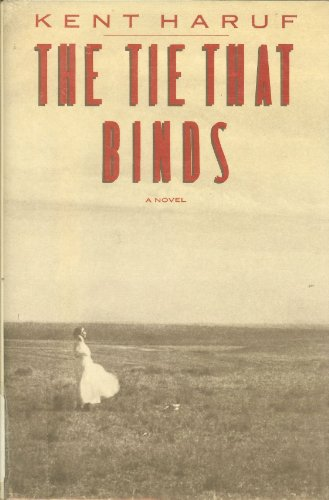
First Edition (publ. Holt, Rinehart and Winston)

The Tie That Binds is a novel by Kent Haruf. Written in 1984, the novel is Haruf's first major work, receiving a Whiting Award and a special Hemingway Foundation/PEN citation. It is the story of 80-year-old Edith Goodnough of Holt County, Colorado, as told to an unnamed inquirer on a Sunday afternoon in the spring of 1977 by her 50-year-old neighbor.

== Plot summary ==
The story opens with the narrator, Sanders Roscoe, defending his neighbor Edith Goodnough to a reporter trying to dig up dirt on her. She has been accused of murdering her brother Lyman. Sanders seems disappointed in the sheriff for caving in to the reporter, saying that to understand what happened you would have had to know Edith's story, which he begins to tell.

In 1896, newlyweds Roy and Ada Goodnough leave Iowa and settle down in northeastern Colorado under the Homestead Act. Roy eventually succeeds in growing wheat. Ada bears him two children: Edith, who is born in 1897, and Lyman, born two years later.

Very soon Ada regrets leaving Iowa. Her husband turns out to be a bully, an angry and violent man who makes her and their children work very hard on the farm. When she dies in 1914, aged only 42, Edith has to take over all of Ada's chores and duties. Then, in 1915, Roy's hands get entangled in a machine, and nine of his fingers are chopped off. He treats Edith and Lyman as his "self-sired farmhands", bossing them around and making all decisions himself.

As the two siblings grow up, they soon realize that they are stuck on their father's farm. For the next 37 years, Edith performs the duties of farmer, housewife and nurse without ever complaining, and refusing to get involved with men except for a brief romance with the narrator's father, who Edith loves but refuses to marry. Despite her rejection, he never gets over her. Lyman finally sees his chance of escape when in 1941 the United States is attacked by Japan. In the middle of the night and with the help of the Roscoes, he leaves the farm and goes to the city to join the armed forces. At 42 he is too old to enlist and instead embarks on a 20-year tour of the United States. During those years, Edith never doubts that brother will return. He does in the early 1960s, almost ten years after their father's death at 82.

For six years Edith and Lyman, now both in their sixties, live happily together in their farm house. Then in 1967, the Goodnoughs, Sanders and his wife Mavis, now eight months pregnant, decide to go to the county fair together. Lyman crashes his car, causing Mavis to miscarry and giving himself a head injury from which he never truly recovers. Edith looks after her brother, who becomes more and more reclusive, eventually refusing to leave the house.

As they grow older and frailer, Edith decides to move everything downstairs and close off the second story, and enlists Sanders' help. In the following years, Edith draws some pleasure from spending afternoons with Rena, Sanders' daughter, who is born in 1969. But soon it becomes too dangerous for Rena to go to the Goodnoughs on her own, as Lyman, who has regressed to infancy, is prone to unprompted outbursts of violence. Eventually, on New Year's Eve 1976, Edith, is unable to care for Lyman but unwilling to put him in a home. She has Lyman put on his best clothes, cooks a three-course dinner for him, waits for him to fall asleep and then sets fire to their house. The fire is detected and the two siblings are evacuated. However, Lyman never recovers from injuries inflicted by the fire and dies soon afterwards.

In the spring of 1977 Edith is still lying in a hospital bed with a policeman stationed outside her room and facing charges of attempted murder. The Roscoes visit every day.

== Reception and adaptations ==
Charles Michaud, in the Library Journal, wrote that the book was "in the tradition of Hamlin Garland and Willa Cather" and praised the "simple, engaging style." The Christian Science Monitor also reviewed the novel positively, commenting that "the voice of his narrator reverberates after the last page." Perry Glasser, reviewing the book for the New York Times, commented on the "rhythmic, evocative language", summarizing the work as a "fine first novel". In a less positive retrospective review, Joyce Carol Oates described the book as "both touching and exasperating", adding that Haruf "shrinks from assessing, still less questioning" Edith's choices.

In 2019, a dramatization of The Tie That Binds, adapted by Carol Samson, was featured in that year's Kent Haruf Literary Celebration, performed in his hometown of Salida.
