= Yuma, Colorado =

City in Colorado, United States

- Home rule municipality
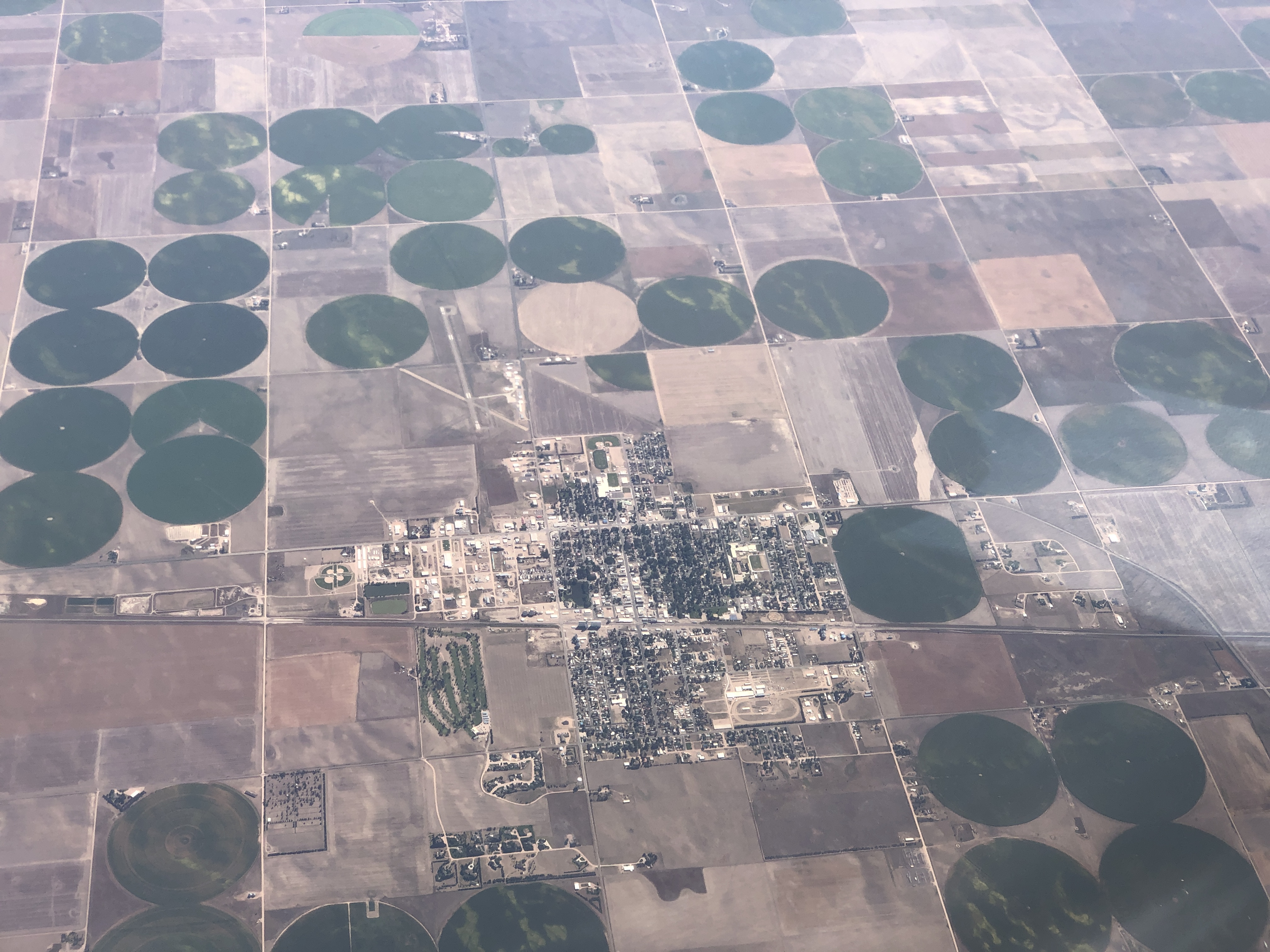
- Aerial view of Yuma (2022)

- Location within Yuma County and Colorado
- Coordinates: 40°07′37″N 102°43′01″W
- Country: United States
- State: Colorado
- County: Yuma
- Incorporated: March 24, 1887

Area
  - Total: 3.14 sq mi (8.13 km^{2})
  - Land: 3.10 sq mi (8.03 km^{2})
  - Water: 0.039 sq mi (0.10 km^{2})
- Elevation: 4,124 ft (1,257 m)

Population (2020)
  - Total: 3,456
  - Density: 1,110/sq mi (430/km^{2})
- Time zone: UTC−7 (MST)
  - Summer (DST): UTC−6 (MDT)
- ZIP Code: 80759
- Area code: 970
- GNIS place ID: 2412329
- FIPS code: 08-86750
- Website: cityofyuma.colorado.gov

Yuma is a home rule municipality that is the most populous municipality in Yuma County, Colorado, United States. The population was 3,456 at the 2020 census.

== History ==
A post office in Yuma has been in operation since 1885. The community was named after a Native American named Yuma, a railroad worker who died and is buried near the town site.

Yuma, Colorado is referenced in the song El Cadete by Mexican ballad band Grupo Laberinto.

On August 8, 2023, a tornado touched down near the town, damaging farms.

The Yuma School's mascot is the Outlaws.

The novels of esteemed writer Kent Haruf, such as Plainsong, are based in Holt, Colorado which is loosely based on Yuma. Haruf spent a number of years teaching at Yuma schools in the early 1980s and has family ties to the High Plains region.

== Geography ==
According to the United States Census Bureau, the city has a total area of 1 square mile (2.6 km^{2}), of which 1 square mile (2.6 km^{2}) is land and 0.41% is water. Yuma is 27 miles from the nearest city, Wray.

=== Climate ===
Climate data for Yuma, Colorado (1991–2020 normals, extremes 1900–1902, 1939–present)
Month	Jan	Feb	Mar	Apr	May	Jun	Jul	Aug	Sep	Oct	Nov	Dec	Year
Record high °F (°C)	77 (25)	82 (28)	89 (32)	93 (34)	100 (38)	111 (44)	109 (43)	111 (44)	103 (39)	94 (34)	90 (32)	77 (25)	111 (44)
Mean daily maximum °F (°C)	42.6 (5.9)	45.2 (7.3)	56.2 (13.4)	63.3 (17.4)	73.2 (22.9)	85.8 (29.9)	91.8 (33.2)	88.9 (31.6)	80.6 (27.0)	66.3 (19.1)	53.2 (11.8)	42.9 (6.1)	65.8 (18.8)
Daily mean °F (°C)	29.9 (−1.2)	32.0 (0.0)	41.7 (5.4)	48.9 (9.4)	59.5 (15.3)	71.1 (21.7)	76.9 (24.9)	74.3 (23.5)	65.4 (18.6)	51.6 (10.9)	39.6 (4.2)	30.2 (−1.0)	51.8 (11.0)
Mean daily minimum °F (°C)	17.2 (−8.2)	18.8 (−7.3)	27.1 (−2.7)	34.5 (1.4)	45.8 (7.7)	56.4 (13.6)	62.1 (16.7)	59.7 (15.4)	50.2 (10.1)	36.9 (2.7)	26.0 (−3.3)	17.6 (−8.0)	37.7 (3.2)
Record low °F (°C)	−28 (−33)	−27 (−33)	−22 (−30)	4 (−16)	11 (−12)	29 (−2)	37 (3)	35 (2)	14 (−10)	3 (−16)	−14 (−26)	−33 (−36)	−33 (−36)
Average precipitation inches (mm)	0.29 (7.4)	0.44 (11)	0.81 (21)	1.64 (42)	2.94 (75)	2.49 (63)	3.07 (78)	2.64 (67)	1.44 (37)	1.25 (32)	0.50 (13)	0.45 (11)	17.96 (456)
Average snowfall inches (cm)	3.9 (9.9)	3.1 (7.9)	3.7 (9.4)	1.9 (4.8)	0.1 (0.25)	0.0 (0.0)	0.0 (0.0)	0.0 (0.0)	0.2 (0.51)	1.4 (3.6)	2.8 (7.1)	5.7 (14)	22.8 (58)
Average precipitation days (≥ 0.01 in)	2.2	2.9	3.0	6.8	9.4	7.9	9.1	8.6	4.8	4.7	2.6	2.6	64.6
Average snowy days (≥ 0.1 in)	1.9	2.3	1.3	0.9	0.1	0.0	0.0	0.0	0.0	0.5	1.3	2.2	10.5
Source: NOAA

== Demographics ==
Historical population
Census	Pop.	Note	%±
1890	241		—
1900	139		−42.3%
1910	333		139.6%
1920	1,177		253.5%
1930	1,360		15.5%
1940	1,606		18.1%
1950	1,908		18.8%
1960	1,919		0.6%
1970	2,259		17.7%
1980	2,824		25.0%
1990	2,719		−3.7%
2000	3,285		20.8%
2010	3,524		7.3%
2020	3,456		−1.9%

== Gallery ==
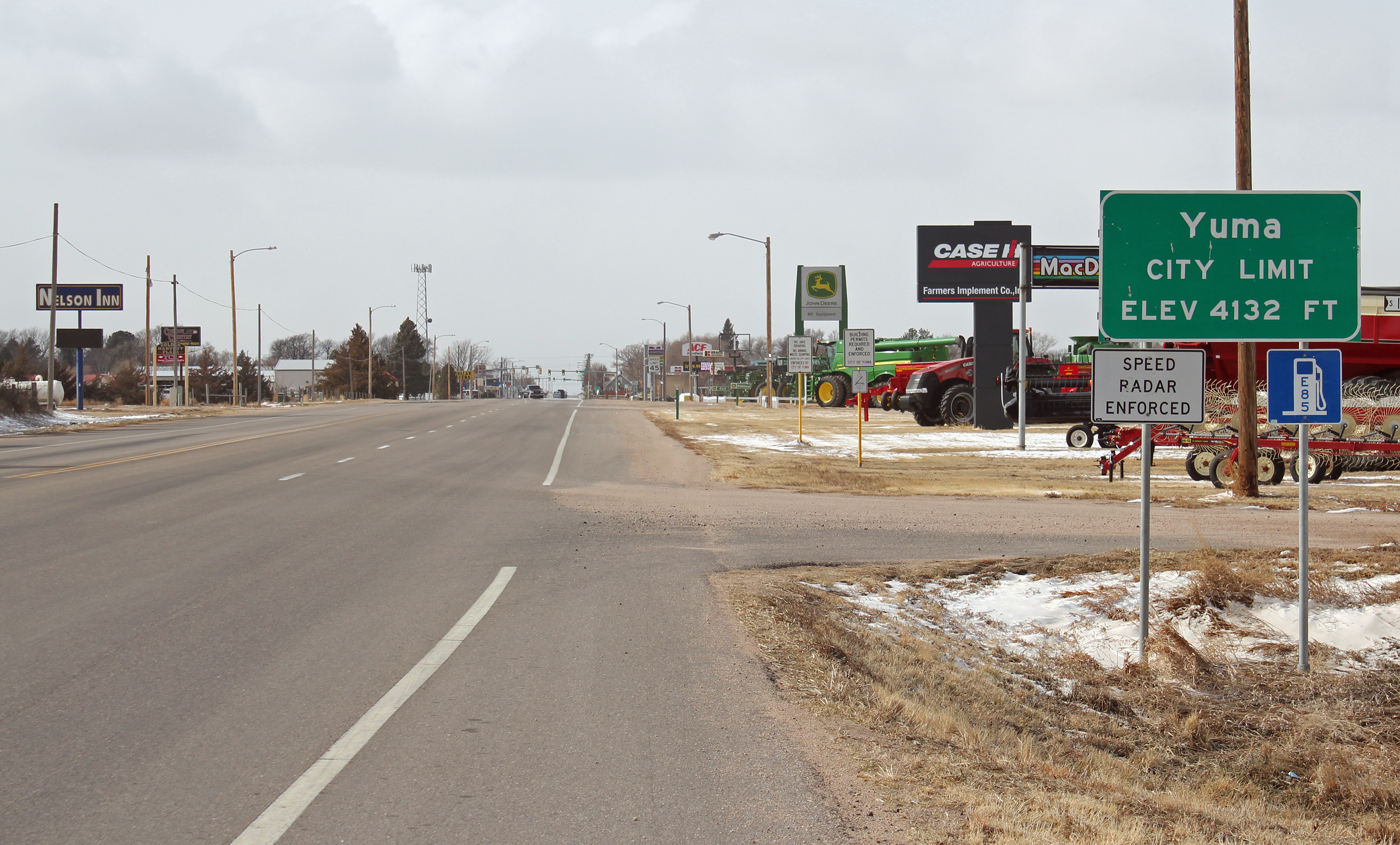
Yuma seen from the east

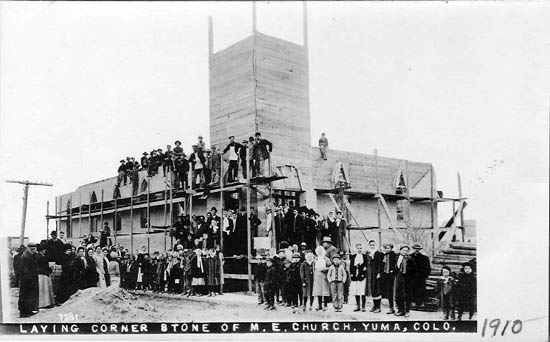
Postcard: Laying the cornerstone of the Methodist Episcopal Church, 1910

== See also ==
- Yuma County, Colorado
