= Plainsong (novel) =

1999 novel by Kent Haruf

- Author: Kent Haruf
- Translator: Joseph Hilton
- Illustrator: Grant Evans
- Cover artist: Dean Walton
- Language: English
- Genre: Fiction
- Publisher: Alfred A. Knopf
- Publication date: October 1999
- Publication place: United States
- Media type: Print (hardback & paperback)
- Pages: 301
- ISBN: 0-375-40618-2
- OCLC: 41272953
- Dewey Decimal: 813/.54 21
- LC Class: PS3558.A716 P58 1999

Plainsong is a novel by Kent Haruf. Set in the fictional town of Holt, Colorado, it tells the interlocking stories of some of the inhabitants. The title comes from a type of unadorned music sung in Christian churches, and is a reference to both the Great Plains setting and the simple style of the writing. The novel was adapted in 2004 into a Hallmark Hall of Fame TV movie. It is the first of a trilogy: the following novels are Eventide and Benediction.

== Premise and characters ==
The book follows the stories of several families in a small town in eastern Colorado.

=== Characters ===
- Tom Guthrie, a history teacher whose wife is growing distant and disturbed.
- Ike and Bobby, Tom's young sons who struggle with abandonment by their mother.
- Victoria Roubideaux, one of Tom's teenage pupils. When Victoria becomes pregnant, her alcoholic mother ejects her from the family home. She later comes to live with the McPherons.
- Raymond and Harold McPheron, elderly bachelor farmers who give Victoria a safe home and care for her.
- Maggie Jones, another schoolteacher at the local school, who first shelters Victoria.

== Reception ==
Plainsong, published in 1999, received rave reviews from critics and became a bestseller. It was first noticed and promoted by independent bookstores, before being praised by Kirkus Reviews and Publishers Weekly. A limited marketing campaign from Knopf followed, but the company (and Haruf's editor Gary Fisketjon) attributed most of Plainsong's success to word of mouth. The novel had sold more than 800,000 copies by 2004 and was described by the Wall Street Journal as a "runaway bestseller".

Verlyn Klinkenborg of the New York Times called the book "so foursquare, so delicate and lovely, that it has the power to exalt the reader," while his colleague Michiko Kakutani added that it was a "compelling and compassionate" novel. Kirkus Reviews wrote that the book was a "stirring meditation on the true nature and necessity of the family... honest and precise." Chris Waddington of the Minnesota Star Tribune wrote that the "steady, hymnlike unfolding" of the story along with the "unornamented yet elegant" prose brought to mind "the underlying cadences and accumulative force of the King James Bible."

Joyce Carol Oates, writing for the New York Review of Books, took a less positive view, criticizing the book for "unabashed sentimentality" and describing it as a "fantasy to confirm our threatened sense of old-fashioned social cohesiveness", although she did concede that in some passages "the language of Plainsong truly sings." The book peaked at #10 on the New York Times Paperback Bestseller list. Plainsong won the Mountains & Plains Booksellers Award and the Maria Thomas Award in Fiction and was a finalist for the National Book Award for Fiction. Poet and academic Ann Fisher-Wirth compared the novel to Cather's My Antonia, noting their sensitive treatment of "sexuality, pregnancy, and birth as natural processes."

Plainsong was adapted into a Hallmark Hall of Fame TV movie on CBS starring America Ferrera; although it received mostly positive reviews and high ratings, Haruf did not care for it. He called it "pablum" and noted that his letter to the director saying "everything they should not do" had been comprehensively ignored.
