= Benediction (play) =

Play

Benediction is a play by Eric Schmiedl, based on the novel Benediction by Kent Haruf, about a small fictional town called Holt, Colorado. There is an old man named Dad Louis, and the story is around him. He ends up dying from cancer.

== Cast ==
- Dad Louis - Mike Hartman
- Mary Louis - Joyce Cohen
- Rob Lyle - Ed Martin
- Beverly Lyle - Nancy Lemenager
- John Wesley Lyle - Nick Lamedica
- Alene Johnson - Nance Williamson
- Willa Johnson - Billie McBride
- Lorraine Louis - Kathleen McCall
- Genevieve Larson - Amelia Corrada
- Alice - Zoe Stahlhut
- Berta May - Lelsie O'Caroll
- Luann - Tracy Shaffer
