= Kent Haruf =

American novelist (1943–2014)

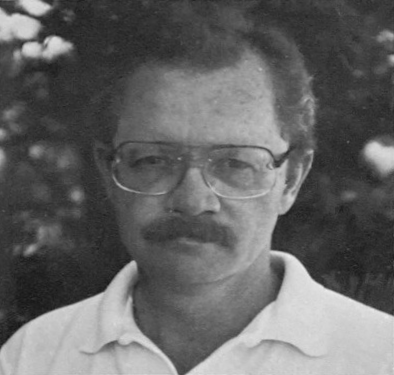
- Haruf c. 1984
- Born: Alan Kent Haruf; February 24, 1943; Pueblo, Colorado, U.S.
- Died: November 30, 2014 (aged 71); Salida, Colorado, U.S.
- Education: Nebraska Wesleyan University (BA); Iowa Writers' Workshop (MFA)
- Occupation: Novelist
- Spouses: Virginia 'Ginger' Koon (m. 1967; div. 1992) Cathy Dempsey (m. 1995)
- Children: 8 (including 5 stepchildren)
- Writing career
- Period: 1984–2014
- Genre: Fiction
- Notable works: The Tie That Binds; Plainsong

Alan Kent Haruf (/hɛrɪf/, rhymes with sheriff; February 24, 1943 – November 30, 2014) was an American writer born and raised in the US state of Colorado. He wrote six novels and several short stories set on the High Plains, mostly in the fictional town of Holt.

After completing his undergraduate degree in English at Nebraska Wesleyan, Haruf enrolled in the Peace Corps and performed work in lieu of military service before receiving a master's degree from the University of Iowa. He initially struggled to establish a career as a writer; in addition to stints as a janitor, construction worker and farmhand, Haruf spent years teaching English at a high school in Wisconsin and at universities in Nebraska and Illinois. His writing was first published in 1984 when he was 41. Although Haruf's first two novels received critical praise, commercial success eluded him until the publication of Plainsong in 1999, which became a bestseller. He followed it up with Eventide (2005), a direct sequel to Plainsong, and Benediction (2013).

Throughout Haruf's career, critics praised his spare and elegant prose, authentic portrayals of rural life, and attention to the beauty found in ordinary things, although he was occasionally criticized for redundancy. In early 2014, Haruf was diagnosed with an incurable lung disease. He wrote his final book, Our Souls at Night, while ill and died that November. The book was published posthumously and adapted into a film of the same name. A Colorado magazine, 5280, wrote that Haruf is "widely considered Colorado's finest novelist", and the Dublin Review of Books called his work "both uniquely American and profoundly universal".

== Life ==
Alan Kent Haruf was born in Pueblo, Colorado, on February 24, 1943, one of four children of Eleanor and Louis Haruf. As a child, he had a cleft lip, and his family's community raised money for a pair of surgeries at Children's Hospital in Denver. The first operation partially addressed the issue, but the surgeon died in a plane crash before the second operation, and it never took place. As Haruf's father worked as a Methodist minister, his family moved frequently when he was a child, and they lived in several small towns in northeastern Colorado. Haruf graduated from Cañon City High School in 1961. As a youth, Haruf aspired to be a rancher, following in the path of both his grandfathers.

Initially, Haruf studied biology at Nebraska Wesleyan University, but he changed his plans after reading Ernest Hemingway and William Faulkner's work. He graduated in 1965 with a Bachelor of Arts in English. He spent two years in the Peace Corps teaching English in Turkey while writing short stories, which he later described as "a good experience for me but of little value to the Turks". Virginia 'Ginger' Koon and Haruf were married in 1967, after his return to the United States. He briefly attended an English graduate program at the University of Kansas, but withdrew during his second semester. Haruf was drafted into the military amidst the ongoing Vietnam War, but as a conscientious objector, served instead at the Craig Rehabilitation Hospital in Denver and an orphanage in Montana. He and Koon had three children, all daughters.

Unable to establish a career as a writer, Haruf taught high school English in Madison, Wisconsin, where he lived with his family for four years. He sought to attend the well-known Iowa Writers' Workshop program at the University of Iowa, but was rejected. Undeterred, Haruf moved his family to Iowa City and began working as a janitor while submitting more stories to the program—he was eventually accepted. He graduated from the program with a Master of Fine Arts degree in 1973. Haruf studied with and learned from many other writers at Iowa, including Vance Bourjaily, John Irving, Seymour Krim, and Dan Wakefield. For his thesis, Haruf produced a novel, which Harper & Row expressed interest in publishing. However, they balked at the finished work, which was also rejected by other publishers. Years later, Haruf told an interviewer that the novel had not deserved publication.

After graduating from Iowa, he took odd jobs on a chicken farm, with a railroad company, and as a construction worker to earn a living. Haruf was eventually hired in 1976 for a position as an assistant professor at his alma mater, Nebraska Wesleyan, and wrote during the summers. He did not succeed in selling his writing until 1984, at age 41, when a short story was accepted at Puerto del Sol. The same year, he connected with agent Peter Matson through Irving. Matson sold Haruf's first published novel, The Tie That Binds, to Holt Rinehart & Winston, and it came out in the fall of 1984. The novel brought Haruf some recognition but did not sell well. His second novel, Where You Once Belonged, was published in 1990 by Summit Books. It also received critical praise but produced even poorer sales, leading him to "despair" at his finances. In 1991, Haruf began teaching at Southern Illinois University Carbondale and was able to devote more time to writing. Haruf and Koon separated in the late 1980s and divorced in 1992. He reconnected with a high school friend, Cathy Dempsey (née Shattuck), at their 30th class reunion in 1991. Haruf and Dempsey married in 1995 and initially lived in Murphysboro, Illinois.

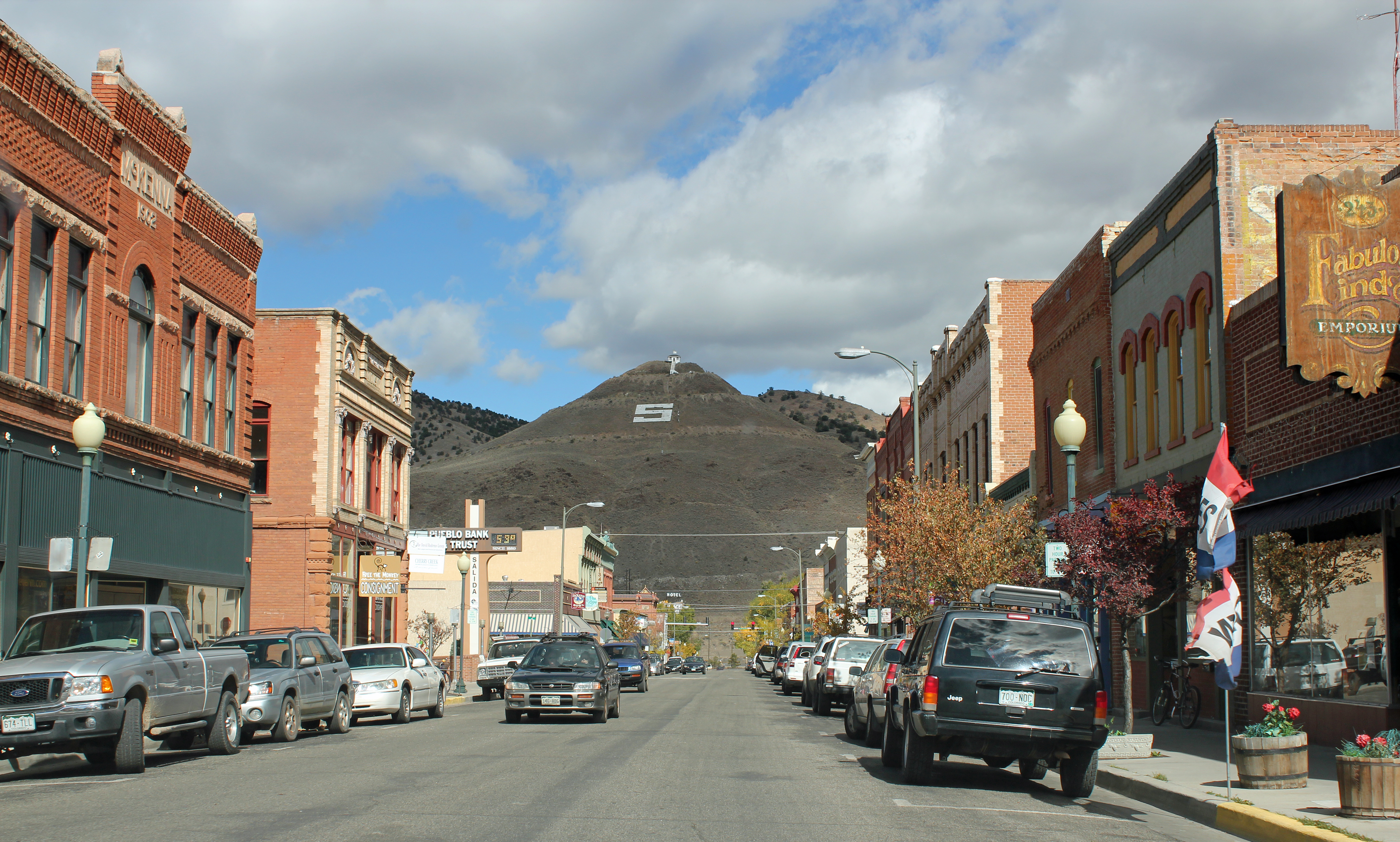
In later life, Haruf lived with his wife Cathy near Salida, Colorado.

Haruf's third novel, Plainsong, published in 1999 by Alfred A. Knopf, at last brought him commercial success, along with further critical attention. It was first noticed and promoted by independent bookstores, before being praised by Kirkus Reviews and Publishers Weekly. A limited marketing campaign from Knopf followed, but the company (and Haruf's editor Gary Fisketjon) attributed most of Plainsong's success to word of mouth. Plainsong peaked at #10 on the New York Times Paperback Bestseller list. The novel had sold nearly a million copies by 2004 and was described by The Wall Street Journal as a "runaway bestseller". Haruf was thereafter able to write full time. He did not much enjoy the attention he received, telling a journalist that "I can fumble my way through interviews—but I'd much rather leave myself out of it ... I prefer to be anonymous." One correspondent, describing Haruf at a book luncheon, noted that "he wears the mantle of success as though it were an itchy sweater". Haruf and Cathy soon moved to a cabin in Salida, Colorado. Plainsong was adapted into a movie by Hallmark in 2004 starring America Ferrera; although the film received mostly positive reviews and high ratings, Haruf did not care for it. He called it "pablum" and opined that his letter to the director saying "everything they should not do" had been comprehensively ignored.

His fourth novel, Eventide, was published in 2005, followed by Benediction in 2013. Along with Plainsong, the two novels were adapted for the stage by the Denver Center Theater Company beginning in 2008. Haruf took close part in the adaptation process; the playwright, Eric Schmiedl, described him as a "muse", saying that he "wanted to be intimately involved, but not in a controlling fashion." In early 2014, Haruf was diagnosed with incurable interstitial lung disease. Inspired by his relationship with Cathy, he wrote the first draft of his last novel, Our Souls at Night, in around 45 days. The couple revised it together and he sent it to his editor in September. Haruf wrote to a friend that working on the novel "[felt] as if it kept me alive; it was something to get up in the morning for." He finished his work on it just days before his death. On November 30, 2014, Haruf died of his lung condition at his home in Salida at the age of 71. Our Souls at Night was published posthumously by Knopf. His papers and drafts are held by the Huntington Library in San Marino, California.

== Writing ==
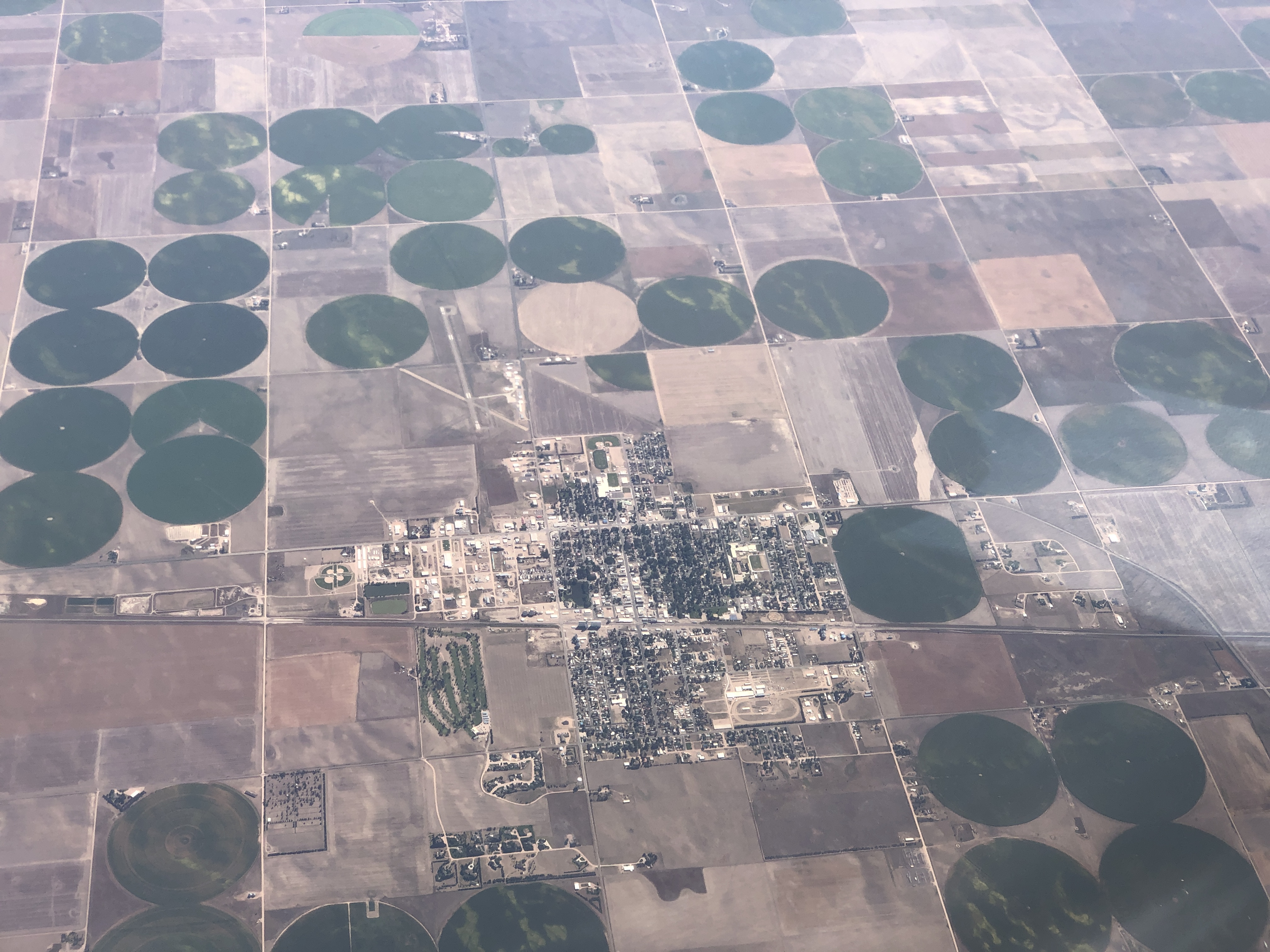
Yuma, Colorado served as inspiration for Haruf's fictional town of Holt.

All of Haruf's novels take place in the fictional town of Holt, in eastern Colorado, based on Yuma and other towns in which he grew up. A Denver magazine, 5280, wrote in 2015 that Haruf is "widely considered Colorado's finest novelist". Haruf rejected characterizations of himself as a regional writer, telling a journalist that he hoped "there's something universal about [my] stories". The Dublin Review of Books called Haruf "one of America's finest writers ... both uniquely American and profoundly universal."

Haruf was influenced by Faulkner, Hemingway and John Steinbeck. He collected Faulkner memorabilia and considered Faulkner's story "The Bear" his favorite work. Before starting to write each day, Haruf would read a passage from another author that he admired. Beginning with Plainsong, he would then obscure his eyes with a stocking cap and blindly produce a stream-of-consciousness first draft. Subsequent drafts would add punctuation and other flourishes. Haruf wrote using a manual typewriter. While living in Salida, in the last phase of his life, Haruf worked in an adapted tool shed on his property. A lifelong habit of eavesdropping on friends and strangers alike was another source of inspiration for him.

Haruf told an interviewer in 2014 that he wanted to achieve "what Chekhov did, to show the beauty and the significance of ordinary people and ordinary moments." One retrospective analysis described Haruf as having "a unique capacity to make virtuous people interesting." Academic Linda Ray Pratt noted that despite his focus on the beauty in ordinary lives, Haruf was "not sentimental about human nature". Pratt also described him as "ahistorical", criticizing his characters' incuriosity about their community's past, in contrast to those in Faulkner's Yoknapatawpha County. Literary critic Jeffrey Folks placed Haruf within the tradition of literature rooted in conservative values, listing as evidence Haruf's approach to spirituality, his "faith in human existence as purposeful and good" and belief in "the need for responsible behavior".

Joseph Powell of Central Washington University commented on the authenticity of Haruf's depictions of rural life, contrasting Plainsong with other works that use rurality merely as set dressing. One literary geographer compared the rurality of Plainsong to New York City as seen in Paul Auster's The Brooklyn Follies, noting that both novels grappled with the state of America just before 9/11. Fellow author Ursula K. Le Guin described Haruf as "a stunningly original writer" in her 2019 book, Words Are My Matter; she noted that "he writes about girls and women with tenderness and without idealization, as individuals." In an essay published in Granta shortly before his death, Haruf wrote that "over the years I have tried not to write too small, and I want to believe I have tried not to live too small, either."

== Critical reception ==
=== Early novels ===
Haruf's first novel, The Tie That Binds (1984), focuses on Edith Goodnough, an elderly resident of Holt County, after she comes under suspicion of murder. Charles Michaud, in Library Journal, wrote that the book was "in the tradition of Hamlin Garland and Willa Cather" and praised the "simple, engaging style". Perry Glasser, reviewing the book for The New York Times, commented on the "rhythmic, evocative language" and noted its accuracy about farm life, summarizing the work as a "fine first novel". The Christian Science Monitor also reviewed the novel positively, commenting that "the voice of his narrator reverberates after the last page". In a retrospective review, Joyce Carol Oates described the book as "both touching and exasperating", adding that Haruf "shrinks from assessing, still less questioning" Edith's choices.

Haruf's second novel, Where You Once Belonged, was published in 1990. It tells the story of Jack Burdette, a former athlete and manager of Holt's grain elevator, as narrated by the editor of the fictional Holt Mercury newspaper. Writing for Library Journal, Joseph Lewandowski described it as a "brief, unhappy novel" which was nevertheless effective. Richard Eder of the Los Angeles Times praised Haruf's prose as "spare and straightforward", yet resulting in "extraordinary poetry", concluding that the novel was "stirring and remarkable". Newsday's Dan Cryer summarized Where You Once Belonged as "a beautifully told parable—simple and stark and true." The Boston Globe's Amanda Heller wrote that Haruf "has the keen eye of a satirist and the tragic sense of a master dramatist." Le Guin referred to Where You Once Belonged as "fairly conventional", and Oates, writing in 1999, felt it was "an adroitly written narrative" that was weakened by its portrayal of Burdette, an "illaudable subject".

=== Plainsong ===
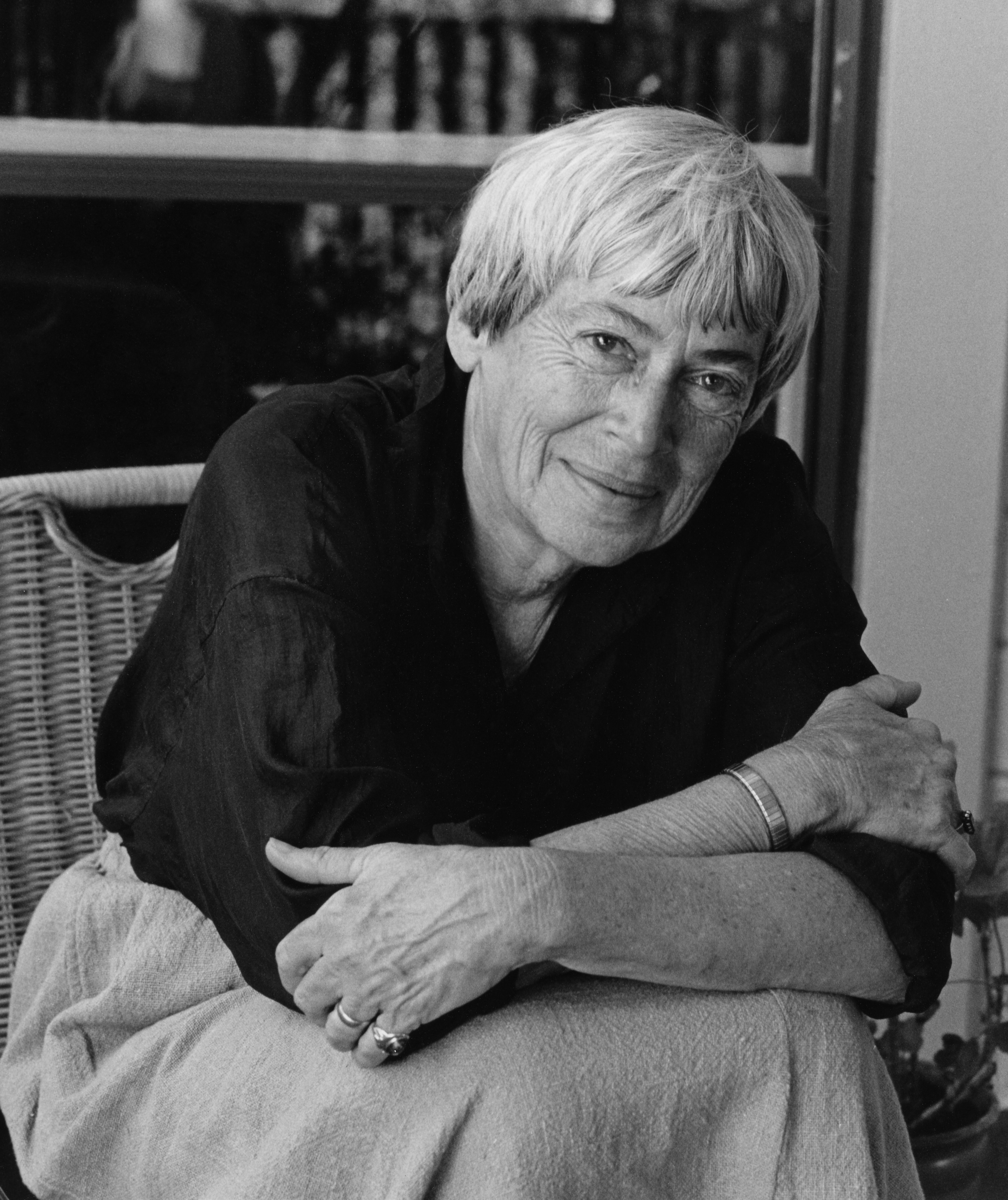
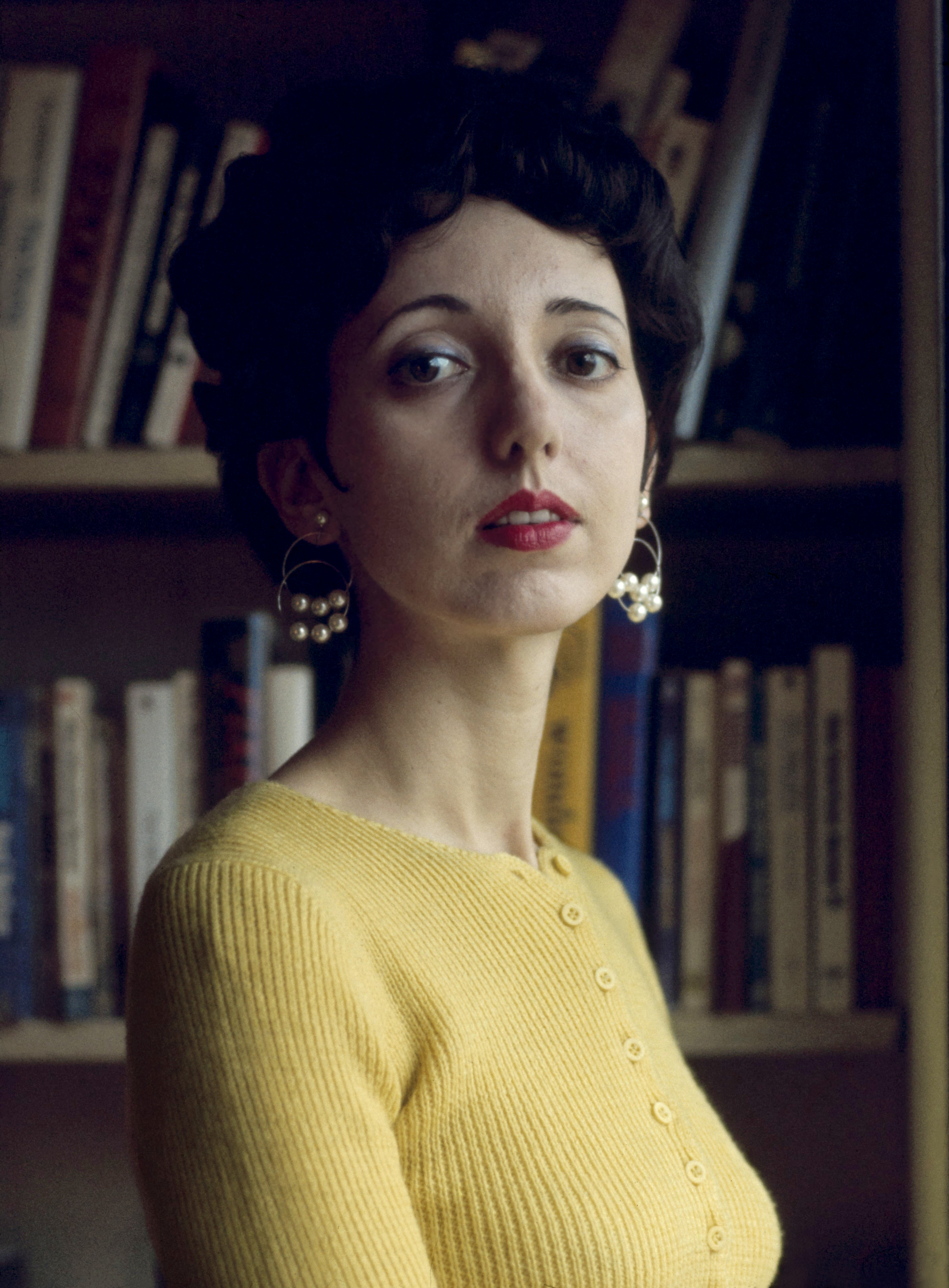
Among fellow authors, Ursula K. Le Guin (left) felt that Haruf was "stunningly original", while Joyce Carol Oates (right) criticized one of his novels for "unabashed sentimentality".

Plainsong, published in 1999, follows the stories of several Holt residents, particularly Maggie Jones and Tom Guthrie (both schoolteachers), Victoria Roubideaux (a pregnant teenager), and the McPheron brothers (isolated ranchers). It received rave reviews from critics and became a bestseller. Verlyn Klinkenborg of The New York Times called the book "so foursquare, so delicate and lovely, that it has the power to exalt the reader". Michiko Kakutani, also of The New York Times, added that it was a "compelling and compassionate" novel, praising its authentic portrayal of rural life and "spareness" of language.

Kirkus Reviews wrote that the book was a "stirring meditation on the true nature and necessity of the family ... honest and precise". Chris Waddington of The Minneapolis Star Tribune felt that the "steady, hymnlike unfolding" of the story along with the "unornamented yet elegant" prose brought to mind "the underlying cadences and accumulative force of the King James Bible." Poet and academic Ann Fisher-Wirth compared Plainsong to Cather's My Ántonia, noting their sensitive treatment of "sexuality, pregnancy, and birth as natural processes". Oates, writing for The New York Review of Books, criticized the book for "unabashed sentimentality" and described it as a "fantasy to confirm our threatened sense of old-fashioned social cohesiveness", although she did concede that in some passages "the language of Plainsong truly sings". The novel was a finalist for the National Book Award for Fiction.

=== Later works ===
In 2004, Haruf published a sequel to Plainsong entitled Eventide. Library Journal described the prose as "crisp" and the novel as "honest storytelling that is compelling and rings true." Publishers Weekly felt that the book was "as lovely and accomplished as its predecessor", calling it "an uncommonly rich novel". Booklist's Donna Seaman also praised Eventide, commenting on Haruf's "faith in goodness" and lauding him as "a master of restraint and a writer of remarkable tenderness and dignity". In a more negative review, Jonathan Miles of The New York Times dubbed it overly similar to Plainsong, labeling it a "repeat performance" and arguing that the book's readers were comparable to Pottery Barn shoppers. Although Kakutani also noted commonalities with Plainsong, she assessed Eventide, with its "understated prose" and "simple, laconic" dialogue, as having "the lovely, measured grace of an old hymn."

Haruf's penultimate novel, Benediction, was published in 2014. The book focuses on the final months of Holt's hardware store owner, "Dad" Lewis, who has incurable cancer. Noting its post-9/11 setting, Paul Elie of The New York Times held that Haruf used the book to dispel the idea that Holt was "outside the stream of current affairs", and felt the novel was "affecting but transitional ... genuine but incomplete". The Denver Post's reviewer, Tucker Shaw, wrote that "Haruf has an extraordinary grasp of quiet" in his review, which summarized the book as "a masterful look at end of life". Kirkus Reviews criticized Benediction, arguing that although Lewis' story had "dignity and gravitas", other plotlines were "contrived" and redundant. Brad Hooper of Booklist described it as a "a story elegant in its simple telling and remarkable in its authentic capture of universal human emotions."

Our Souls at Night, Haruf's final novel, was published posthumously in 2015. The book centers on the relationship between Addie and Louis, two elderly and widowed neighbors who begin spending nights together to fight loneliness. Joan Silber of The New York Times described it as exemplifying Haruf's "great subject, the struggle of decency against small-mindedness", noting his "dogged insistence that simple elements carry depth". Ann Hulbert, writing for The Atlantic, reported that Our Souls at Night "delivers a retort to critics who yawned that Haruf was stuck in his homespun ways", adding that he, "triumphantly, succeeds in having the last word". The New Yorker described the novel as a "delicate, sneakily devastating evocation of place and character." The Washington Post's Ron Charles praised Our Souls at Night, writing that it is "such a tender, carefully polished work that it seems like a blessing we had no right to expect." In translation by Fabio Cremonesi, Haruf's works, starting with Our Souls at Night, became bestsellers in Italy beginning in 2017. The novel was adapted in 2017 into a film by the same name, directed by Ritesh Batra and starring Robert Redford and Jane Fonda.

== Recognition ==
Year	Book	Award	Category	Result	Ref
1984	The Tie That Binds	PEN/Hemingway Award for Debut Novel	—	Runner-up	
1986	—	Whiting Award	Fiction	Won	
1999	Plainsong	Book Sense Award	—	Shortlisted	
1999	Plainsong	National Book Award	Fiction	Shortlisted	
1999	Plainsong	Alex Awards		Won	
2005	Eventide	Book Sense Award	—	Shortlisted	
2005	Eventide	Colorado Book Award	—	Won	
2005	West of Last Chance a.k.a. High Plains	Lange-Taylor Prize	—	Won	
2006	—	Dos Passos Prize	—	Won	
2012	—	Wallace Stegner Award	—	Won	
2014	Benediction	Folio Prize	—	Shortlisted	

== Works ==
=== Novels ===
- Haruf, Kent (1984). The Tie That Binds. New York City: Holt, Rinehart and Winston. ISBN 9780375724381.
- Haruf, Kent (1990). Where You Once Belonged. New York City: Summit Books. ISBN 9780375708701.
- Haruf, Kent (1999). Plainsong. New York City: Alfred A. Knopf. ISBN 9780375406188.
- Haruf, Kent (2005). Eventide. New York City: Alfred A. Knopf. ISBN 9780375725760.
- Haruf, Kent (2013). Benediction. New York City: Alfred A. Knopf. ISBN 9780307959881.
- Haruf, Kent (2015). Our Souls at Night. New York City: Alfred A. Knopf. ISBN 9781101875896.

=== Short stories ===
- Haruf, Kent (1982). "Now (And Then)". Puerto del Sol. 17 (Spring/Summer).
- Haruf, Kent (1986). "The Autopsy of Sam Adams". Grand Street. 5 (Spring): 7–18. doi:10.2307/25006862. JSTOR 25006862.
- Haruf, Kent (1986). "Private Debts/Public Holdings". Grand Street. 6 (Autumn): 18–32. doi:10.2307/25006924. JSTOR 25006924.
- Haruf, Kent (1992). "Dancing". Prairie Schooner. 66 (Summer): 53–65. JSTOR 40633046.
- Haruf, Kent (1994). "Inside T.O. Judy's Mouth". Gettysburg Review. 7 (Summer): 483–95.

=== Essays ===
- Haruf, Kent (November 20, 2000). "To See Your Story Clearly, Start by Pulling the Wool Over Your Own Eyes". The New York Times.
- Haruf, Kent (December 25, 2004). "A Life on the Plains". The New York Times.
- Haruf, Kent (2009). "Any Man's Death". Granta. Work (109): 91–96.
- Haruf, Kent (November 13, 2014). "The Making of a Writer". Granta. Essays & Memoir. Fate (129).

=== Other ===
- Haruf, Kent; Brown, Peter (2008). West of Last Chance. High Plains. New York City: W.W. Norton & Co. ISBN 9780393065725.

== Adaptations ==
- "Private Debts/Public Holdings"
  - Adapted into a short film by Nancy Cooperstein and Chanticleer Films in 1987.
- Plainsong
  - Adapted into a movie by Hallmark in 2004.
  - Adapted for the stage by the Denver Center Theatre Company in 2008.
- Eventide
  - Adapted for the stage by the Denver Center Theatre Company in 2010.
- Benediction
  - Adapted for the stage by the Denver Center Theatre Company in 2015.
- Our Souls at Night
  - Adapted into a movie by Netflix in 2017.
