= List of Carey Mulligan performances =

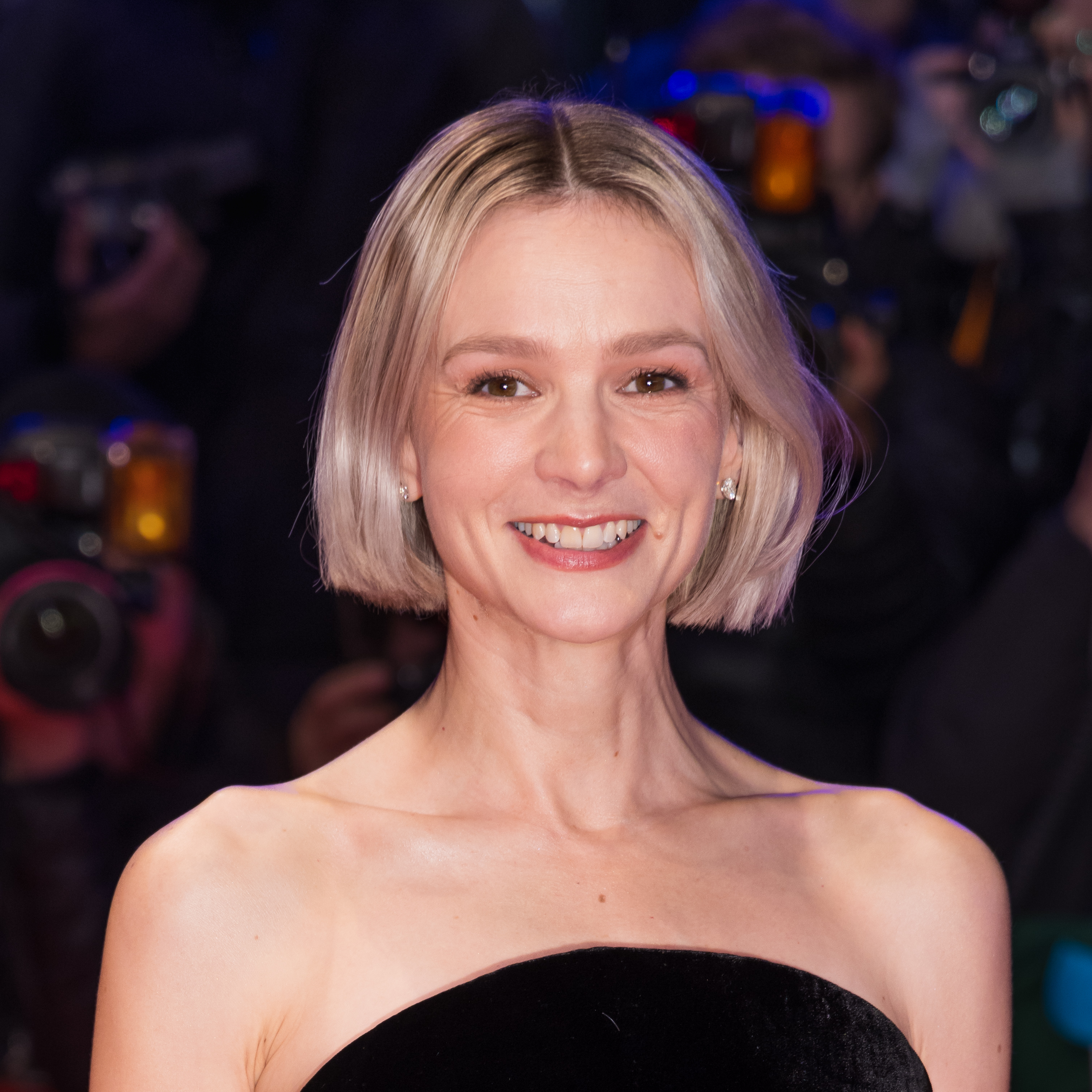
Mulligan in 2024

English actress Carey Mulligan made her stage debut in the Kevin Elyot play Forty Winks (2004) at the Royal Court Theatre. The following year she made her television debut in the BBC One series Bleak House (2005), an adaptation of Charles Dickens' novel of the same name. She expanded to films with a supporting role in the Joe Wright-directed period romance Pride and Prejudice (2005), an adaptation of Jane Austen's novel of the same name. She then came to prominence playing an English schoolgirl in the coming of age film An Education (2009), for which she was nominated for an Academy Award for Best Actress.

Mulligan continued to garner praise for such films as the dystopian drama Never Let Me Go (2010), the action film Drive (2011), the psychological drama Shame (2011), the dark musical Inside Llewyn Davis (2013), the romantic drama Far from the Madding Crowd (2015), the historical drama Mudbound (2017), the coming of age film Wildlife (2018), and the biographical drama She Said (2021). She also played Daisy Buchanan in Baz Luhrman's The Great Gatsby (2013), an adaptation of F. Scott Fitzgerald's novel of the same name, which ranks as her highest-grossing release. She received further Academy Award nominations for Best Actress for playing a vengeful woman in the dark comedy Promising Young Woman (2020) and Felicia Montealegre in the biographical drama Maestro (2023).

On stage, she played Nina in the revival of Anton Chekov's The Seagull both on the West End in 2007 and on Broadway in 2008. For her role in the revival of the David Hare play Skylight she received a nomination for the Tony Award for Best Actress in a Play. She has also acted off Broadway in the Ingmar Bergman adaptation Through a Glass Darkly (2011) and the solo show Girls & Boys (2018).

== Acting credits ==
=== Film ===
Year	Title	Role	Notes	Ref.
2005	Pride & Prejudice	Kitty Bennet		
2007	Blood on Benefits	Emma	Short film	
2007	And When Did You Last See Your Father?	Rachel		
2008	Slapper	Susan	Short film	
2009	The Greatest	Rose		
2009	Brothers	Cassie Willis		
2009	Public Enemies	Carol Slayman		
2009	An Education	Jenny Mellor		
2010	Never Let Me Go	Kathy H		
2010	Wall Street: Money Never Sleeps	Winnie Gekko		
2011	Drive	Irene		
2011	Shame	Sissy Sullivan		
2013	The Great Gatsby	Daisy Buchanan		
2013	Inside Llewyn Davis	Jean Berkey		
2015	Far from the Madding Crowd	Bathsheba Everdene		
2015	Suffragette	Maud Watts		
2017	Mudbound	Laura McAllan		
2018	Wildlife	Jeanette Brinson		
2020	Promising Young Woman	Cassandra "Cassie" Thomas	Also executive producer	
2020	A Christmas Carol	Belle (voice)		
2021	The Dig	Edith Pretty		
2022	She Said	Megan Twohey		
2023	Saltburn	Poor Dear Pamela		
2023	Maestro	Felicia Montealegre		
2024	Spaceman	Lenka Procházka		
2025	The Ballad of Wallis Island	Nell Mortimer	Also executive producer	
2026	Wildwood	Alexandra (voice)		
2027	Narnia: The Magician's Nephew †	Mabel Kirke	Post-production	
2027	The Bell Jar †	Mrs. Greenwood	Filming	

Key
†	Denotes productions that have not yet been released

=== Television ===
Year	Title	Role	Notes	Ref.
2005	Bleak House	Ada Clare	Miniseries (15 episodes)	
2006	The Amazing Mrs. Pritchard	Emily Pritchard	6 episodes	
2006	Agatha Christie's Marple	Violet Willett	Episode: "The Sittaford Mystery"	
2006	Trial & Retribution	Emily Harrogate	2 episodes	
2007	Waking the Dead	Sister Bridgid	2 episodes	
2007	Northanger Abbey	Isabella Thorpe	Television film	
2007	My Boy Jack	Elsie Kipling	Television film	
2007	Doctor Who	Sally Sparrow	Episode: "Blink"	
2014	The Spoils of Babylon	Lady Anne York (voice)	2 episodes	
2015	The Walker	Sunny	8 episodes	
2018	Collateral	DI Kip Glaspie	Miniseries (4 episodes)	
2019	My Grandparents' War	Herself	Episode: "Episode 4"	
2021	Saturday Night Live	Herself (host)	Episode: "Carey Mulligan/Kid Cudi"	
2026	Beef	Lindsay Crane-Martín	Main role (season 2)	

=== Stage ===
Year	Title	Role	Venue	Ref.
2004	Forty Winks	Hermia	Royal Court Theatre, London	
2005–06	The Hypochondriac	Angelique	Almeida Theatre, London	
2007	The Seagull	Nina Zarechnaya	Royal Court Theatre, London	
2008	The Seagull	Nina Zarechnaya	Walter Kerr Theatre, Broadway	
2011	Through a Glass Darkly	Karin	Atlantic Theatre Company, Off-Broadway	
2014	Skylight	Kyra Hollis	Wyndham's Theatre, West End	
2015	Skylight	Kyra Hollis	Golden Theatre, Broadway	
2018	Girls & Boys	Performer	Royal Court Theatre, London	
2018	Girls & Boys	Performer	Minetta Lane Theatre, Off-Broadway	

=== Podcast ===
Year	Title	Role	Notes	Ref.
2022	I Hear Fear	Narrator		
2023	The Foxes of Hydesville	Leah Fox	Also executive producer	

== Discography ==
Year	Title	Album
2010	"Write About Love" (Belle and Sebastian featuring Carey Mulligan)	Write About Love
2011	"Theme from New York, New York"	Shame
2013	"Five Hundred Miles" (with Justin Timberlake and Stark Sands)	Inside Llewyn Davis
2014	"Didn't Leave Nobody but the Baby" (with Gillian Welch and Rhiannon Giddens)	Another Day, Another Time: Celebrating the Music of Inside Llewyn Davis
2015	"Let No Man Steal Your Thyme" (solo or with Michael Sheen)	Far from the Madding Crowd
2023	"Façade: Sir Beelzebub" (with Zachary Booth)	Maestro
2025	"Morning Evening"	The Ballad of Wallis Island (with Tom Basden as McGwyer Mortimer)
2025	"Lover, Please Stay"	The Ballad of Wallis Island (with Tom Basden as McGwyer Mortimer)
2025	"Angels"	The Ballad of Wallis Island (with Tom Basden as McGwyer Mortimer)
2025	"Give Your Love"	The Ballad of Wallis Island (with Tom Basden as McGwyer Mortimer)
2025	"Slip Away"	The Ballad of Wallis Island (with Tom Basden as McGwyer Mortimer)
2025	"Raspberry Fair"	The Ballad of Wallis Island (with Tom Basden as McGwyer Mortimer)
2025	"Summer's Here"	The Ballad of Wallis Island (with Tom Basden as McGwyer Mortimer)
2025	"Sweetheart"	The Ballad of Wallis Island (with Tom Basden as McGwyer Mortimer)
2025	"Awake"	The Ballad of Wallis Island (with Tom Basden as McGwyer Mortimer)
2025	"Inside a Whale"	The Ballad of Wallis Island (with Tom Basden as McGwyer Mortimer)
2025	"Our Love"	The Ballad of Wallis Island (with Tom Basden as McGwyer Mortimer)
2025	"Sky Child"	The Ballad of Wallis Island (with Tom Basden as McGwyer Mortimer)
2025	"The Sea Silver"	The Ballad of Wallis Island (with Tom Basden as McGwyer Mortimer)
2025	"Into the Night"	The Ballad of Wallis Island (with Tom Basden as McGwyer Mortimer)
2025	"The Ballad of Wallis Island"	The Ballad of Wallis Island (with Tom Basden as McGwyer Mortimer)

== See also ==
- List of awards and nominations received by Carey Mulligan
