= List of awards and nominations received by Carey Mulligan =

Carey Mulligan awards and nominations
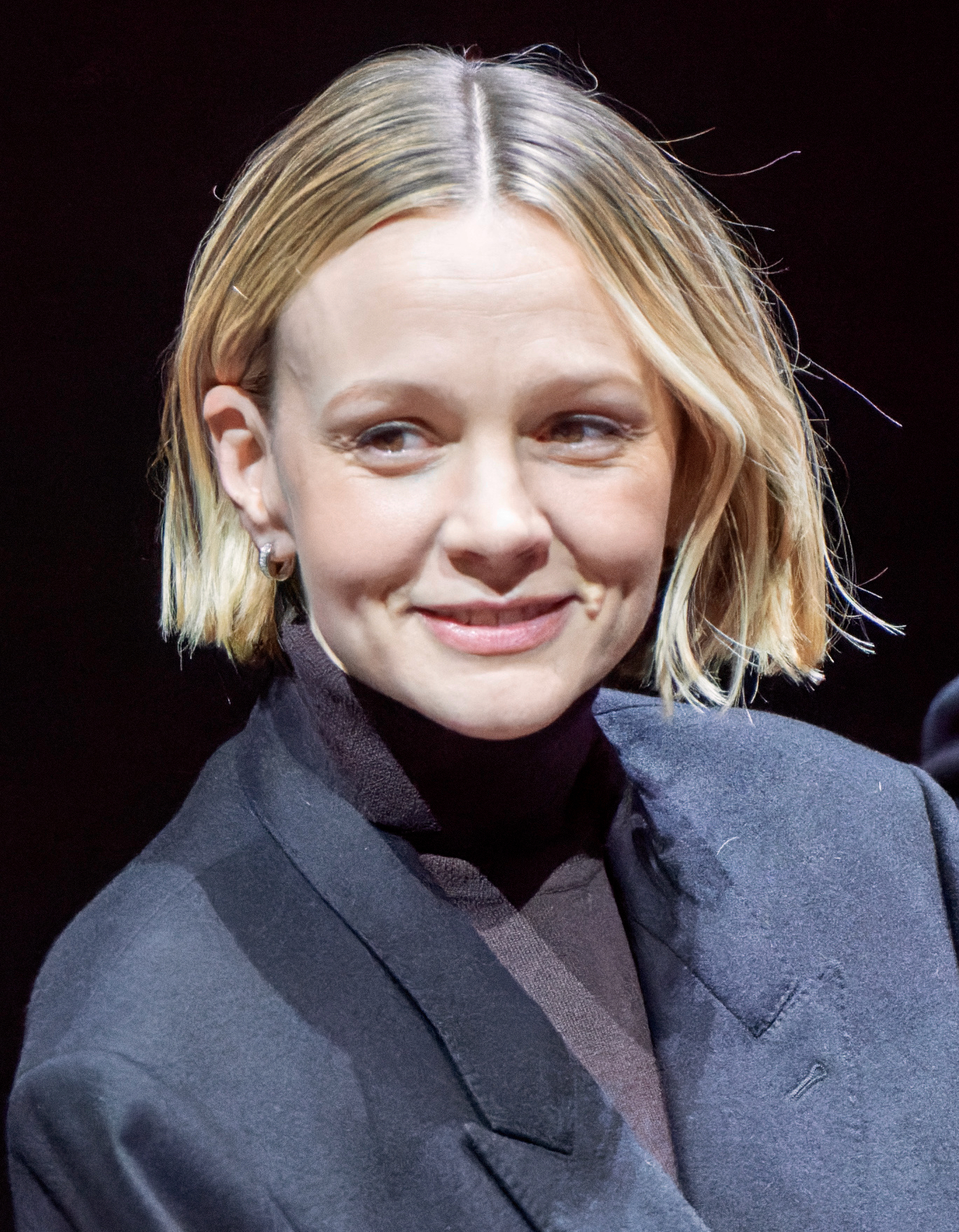
- Mulligan at a screening for Maestro (2023).
Awards and nominations
| Award | Wins | Nominations |
| Academy Awards | 0 | 3 |
| Actor Awards | 0 | 5 |
| BAFTA Awards | 1 | 6 |
| Critics' Choice Awards | 1 | 4 |
| Emmy Awards | 0 | 2 |
| European Film Awards | 0 | 1 |
| Golden Globe Awards | 0 | 4 |
| Tony Awards | 0 | 1 |

Totals (Note: Certain award groups do not simply award one winner. They acknowledge several different recipients, have runners-up, and have third place. Since this is a specific recognition and is different from losing an award, runner-up mentions are considered wins in this award tally. For simplification and to avoid errors, each award in this list has been presumed to have had a prior nomination.)
- Wins: 81
- Nominations: 145

Carey Mulligan is an English actress known for her roles on stage and screen. She has received a BAFTA Award and a Critics' Choice Award as well as nominations for three Academy Awards, five Actor Awards, four Golden Globe Awards, two Emmy Awards, and a Tony Award.

She has received three nominations for the Academy Award for Best Actress for her performances as a teenage school girl in the coming-of-age drama film An Education (2009), an assault survivor bent on revenge in Promising Young Woman (2020), and Felicia Montealegre in the biographical romantic drama in Maestro (2023). She was Golden Globe-nominated for her roles for An Education (2009), Promising Young Woman (2020), She Said (2021) and Maestro (2023). She received the Critics' Choice Movie Award for Best Actress for Promising Young Woman (2020).

She rose to prominence after being nominated for the BAFTA Rising Star Award and winning the BAFTA Award for Best Actress for An Education in 2009. The following year, Mulligan won the BIFA for Best Actress in a British Independent Film for playing in the dystopian romantic Never Let Me Go, based on the 2005 novel of the same name by Kazuo Ishiguro. In 2011, she earned further acclaim for her supporting roles in Nicolas Winding Refn's action drama Drive and Steve McQueen's erotic drama Shame. Mulligan's performance as Daisy Buchanan in the 2013 film adaptation of F. Scott Fitzgerald's romantic drama The Great Gatsby earned her nomination for the AACTA Award for Best Actress.

On stage, Mulligan was nominated for the Tony Award for Best Actress in a Play for her performance in the Broadway revival of David Hare's Skylight (2015). She received Drama Desk Award nominations for her roles in the Anton Chekov revival The Seagull (2008), the Ingmar Bergman adaptation Through a Glass Darkly (2011), the David Hare revival Skylight (2015), and the Dennis Kelly play Girls & Boys (2019). For the later she was also nominated for the Evening Standard Theatre Award for Best Actress.

On television, she portrayed a haughty wife of a country club manager in the second season of the Netflix anthology series Beef (2025) for which she was nominated for the Primetime Emmy Award for Outstanding Lead Actress in a Limited or Anthology Series or Movie. As a producer of the series she was nominated for the Primetime Emmy Award for Outstanding Limited or Anthology Series.

== Major associations ==
=== Academy Awards ===
| Year | Category | Nominated work | Result | Ref. |
|---|---|---|---|---|
| 2010 | Best Actress | An Education | Nominated | |
| 2021 | Best Actress | Promising Young Woman | Nominated | |
| 2024 | Best Actress | Maestro | Nominated | |

=== Actor Awards ===
| Year | Category | Nominated work | Result | Ref. |
|---|---|---|---|---|
| 2010 | Outstanding Female Actor in a Leading Role | An Education | Nominated | |
| 2010 | Outstanding Cast in a Motion Picture | An Education | Nominated | |
| 2018 | Outstanding Cast in a Motion Picture | Mudbound | Nominated | |
| 2021 | Outstanding Female Actor in a Leading Role | Promising Young Woman | Nominated | |
| 2024 | Outstanding Female Actor in a Leading Role | Maestro | Nominated | |

=== BAFTA Awards ===
| Year | Category | Nominated work | Result | Ref. |
British Academy Film Awards
| 2010 | BAFTA Rising Star Award | —N/a | Nominated | |
| 2010 | Best Actress in a Leading Role | An Education | Won | |
| 2012 | Best Actress in a Supporting Role | Drive | Nominated | |
| 2023 | Best Actress in a Supporting Role | She Said | Nominated | |
| 2024 | Best Actress in a Leading Role | Maestro | Nominated | |
| 2026 | Best Actress in a Supporting Role | The Ballad of Wallis Island | Nominated | |

=== Critics' Choice Awards ===
| Year | Category | Nominated work | Result | Ref. |
Critics' Choice Movie Awards
| 2010 | Best Actress | An Education | Nominated | |
| 2012 | Best Supporting Actress | Shame | Nominated | |
| 2021 | Best Actress | Promising Young Woman | Won | |
| 2024 | Best Actress | Maestro | Nominated | |

=== Emmy Awards ===
| Year | Category | Nominated work | Result | Ref. |
Primetime Emmy Awards
| 2026 | Outstanding Limited or Anthology Series | Beef | Nominated | |
| 2026 | Outstanding Lead Actress in a Limited or Anthology Series or Movie | Beef | Nominated | |

=== Golden Globe Awards ===
| Year | Category | Nominated work | Result | Ref. |
|---|---|---|---|---|
| 2010 | Best Actress in a Motion Picture – Drama | An Education | Nominated | |
| 2021 | Best Actress in a Motion Picture – Drama | Promising Young Woman | Nominated | |
| 2023 | Best Supporting Actress – Motion Picture | She Said | Nominated | |
| 2024 | Best Actress in a Motion Picture – Drama | Maestro | Nominated | |

=== Tony Awards ===
| Year | Category | Nominated work | Result | Ref. |
|---|---|---|---|---|
| 2015 | Best Actress in a Play | Skylight | Nominated | |

== Other theatre awards ==
| Organizations | Year | Category | Project | Result | Ref. |
|---|---|---|---|---|---|
| Drama Desk Awards | 2008 | Outstanding Featured Actress in a Play | The Seagull | Nominated | |
| Drama Desk Awards | 2012 | Outstanding Actress in a Play | Through a Glass Darkly | Nominated | |
| Drama Desk Awards | 2015 | Outstanding Actress in a Play | Skylight | Nominated | |
| Drama Desk Awards | 2019 | Outstanding Solo Performance | Girls & Boys | Nominated | |
| Evening Standard Theatre Awards | 2018 | Best Actress | Girls & Boys | Nominated | |

== Miscellaneous awards ==
| Organizations | Year | Category | Project | Result | Ref. |
|---|---|---|---|---|---|
| AACTA Awards | 2013 | Best Lead Actress in a Film – Cinema | The Great Gatsby | Nominated | |
| AACTA Awards | 2020 | Best International Lead Actress in a Film – Cinema | Promising Young Woman | Won | |
| AACTA Awards | 2023 | Best International Lead Actress in a Film – Cinema | Maestro | Nominated | |
| British Independent Film Awards | 2009 | Best Actress | An Education | Won | |
| British Independent Film Awards | 2010 | Best Actress | Never Let Me Go | Won | |
| British Independent Film Awards | 2011 | Best Supporting Actress | Shame | Nominated | |
| British Independent Film Awards | 2015 | Best Actress | Suffragette | Nominated | |
| Capri Hollywood International Film Festival | 2023 | Best Actress | Maestro | Won | |
| Empire Awards | 2009 | Best Actress | An Education | Nominated | |
| Empire Awards | 2009 | Best Newcomer | An Education | Nominated | |
| Empire Awards | 2011 | Best Actress | Drive | Nominated | |
| European Film Awards | 2021 | European Actress | Promising Young Woman | Nominated | |
| Evening Standard British Film Awards | 2009 | Best Actress | An Education | Nominated | |
| Evening Standard British Film Awards | 2010 | Best Actress | Never Let Me Go | Nominated | |
| Evening Standard British Film Awards | 2011 | Best Actress | Shame | Nominated | |
| Evening Standard British Film Awards | 2017 | Best Supporting Actress | Mudbound | Nominated | |
| Gotham Film Awards | 2017 | Special Jury Award – Ensemble Performance | Mudbound | Won | |
| Gotham TV Awards | 2026 | Outstanding Lead Performance in a Limited Series | Beef | Nominated | |
| Hollywood Film Awards | 2009 | Breakthrough Actress of the Year | An Education | Won | |
| Hollywood Film Awards | 2011 | Supporting Actress Award | Drive and Shame | Won | |
| Hollywood Film Awards | 2015 | Actress Award | Suffragette | Won | |
| Independent Spirit Awards | 2017 | Robert Altman Award | Mudbound | Won | |
| Independent Spirit Awards | 2018 | Best Female Lead | Wildlife | Nominated | |
| Independent Spirit Awards | 2020 | Best Female Lead | Promising Young Woman | Won | |
| MTV Movie & TV Awards | 2021 | Best Performance in a Movie | Promising Young Woman | Nominated | |
| National Board of Review of Motion Pictures | 2009 | Best Actress | An Education | Won | |
| National Board of Review of Motion Pictures | 2020 | Best Actress | Promising Young Woman | Won | |
| Palm Springs International Film Festival | 2011 | Breakthrough Performance Award | Never Let Me Go and Wall Street: Money Never Sleeps | Awarded | |
| Palm Springs International Film Festival | 2021 | International Star Award | Promising Young Woman | Awarded | |
| Palm Springs International Film Festival | 2024 | International Star Award | Maestro | Awarded | |
| Santa Barbara International Film Festival | 2009 | Virtuosos Award | An Education | Won | |
| Santa Barbara International Film Festival | 2020 | Cinema Vanguard Award | Promising Young Woman | Won | |
| Satellite Awards | 2009 | Best Actress – Motion Picture, Drama | An Education | Nominated | |
| Satellite Awards | 2011 | Best Supporting Actress – Motion Picture | Shame | Nominated | |
| Satellite Awards | 2015 | Best Actress – Motion Picture, Drama | Suffragette | Nominated | |
| Satellite Awards | 2020 | Best Actress – Motion Picture, Drama | Promising Young Woman | Nominated | |
| Satellite Awards | 2023 | Best Actress – Motion Picture, Drama | Maestro | Nominated | |
| Saturn Awards | 2010 | Best Actress | Never Let Me Go | Nominated | |
| Teen Choice Awards | 2013 | Choice Movie Actress: Drama | The Great Gatsby | Nominated | |

== Critics associations ==
| Organizations | Year | Category | Project | Result | Ref. |
|---|---|---|---|---|---|
| Alliance of Women Film Journalists | 2009 | Best Actress | An Education | Won | |
| Alliance of Women Film Journalists | 2009 | Best Breakthrough Performance | An Education | Won | |
| Alliance of Women Film Journalists | 2009 | Best Depiction of Nudity, Sexuality or Seduction (shared with Peter Sarsgaard) | An Education | Won | |
| Alliance of Women Film Journalists | 2011 | Alliance of Women Film Journalists | Shame | Nominated | |
| Alliance of Women Film Journalists | 2020 | Best Actress | Promising Young Woman | Nominated | |
| Alliance of Women Film Journalists | 2020 | Bravest Performance | Promising Young Woman | Nominated | |
| Austin Film Critics Association | 2020 | Best Actress | Promising Young Woman | Won | |
| Chicago Film Critics Association | 2009 | Best Actress | An Education | Won | |
| Chicago Film Critics Association | 2009 | Most Promising Performer | An Education | Won | |
| Chicago Film Critics Association | 2020 | Best Actress | Promising Young Woman | Nominated | |
| Chicago Indie Critics | 2023 | Best Actress | Maestro | Nominated | |
| Columbus Film Critics Association | 2023 | Best Lead Performance | Maestro | Nominated | |
| Dallas–Fort Worth Critics Association | 2009 | Best Actress | An Education | Won | |
| Dallas–Fort Worth Critics Association | 2011 | Best Supporting Actress | Shame | 5th place | |
| Dallas–Fort Worth Critics Association | 2015 | Best Actress | Suffragette | 5th place | |
| Dallas–Fort Worth Critics Association | 2020 | Best Actress | Promising Young Woman | Won | |
| Dallas–Fort Worth Critics Association | 2023 | Best Actress | Maestro | 3rd place | |
| Denver Film Critics Society | 2023 | Best Lead Performance | Maestro | Nominated | |
| Detroit Film Critics Society | 2010 | Best Actress | Never Let Me Go | Nominated | |
| Detroit Film Critics Society | 2011 | Best Supporting Actress | Shame | Won | |
| Detroit Film Critics Society | 2020 | Best Actress | Promising Young Woman | Nominated | |
| Dublin Film Critics' Circle | 2009 | Best Actress | An Education | 3rd place | |
| Dublin Film Critics' Circle | 2023 | Best Actress | Maestro | Runner-up | |
| Florida Film Critics Circle | 2020 | Best Actress | Promising Young Woman | Runner-up | |
| Georgia Film Critics Association | 2020 | Best Actress | Promising Young Woman | Won | |
| Georgia Film Critics Association | 2023 | Best Actress | Maestro | Nominated | |
| Hawaii Film Critics Society | 2023 | Best Actress | Maestro | Nominated | |
| Hollywood Creative Alliance | 2023 | Best Actress | Maestro | Nominated | |
| Hollywood Critics Association | 2020 | Best Actress | Promising Young Woman | Won | |
| Houston Film Critics Society | 2009 | Best Actress | An Education | Won | |
| Houston Film Critics Society | 2020 | Best Actress | Promising Young Woman | Won | |
| Indiana Film Journalists Association | 2023 | Best Actress | Maestro | Nominated | |
| IndieWire Critics Poll | 2009 | Best Actress | An Education | 9th place | |
| IndieWire Critics Poll | 2011 | Best Supporting Actress | Shame | 6th place | |
| Las Vegas Film Critics Society | 2023 | Best Actress | Maestro | Nominated | |
| London Film Critics' Circle | 2009 | British Actress of the Year | An Education | Won | |
| London Film Critics' Circle | 2009 | Actress of the Year | An Education | Nominated | |
| London Film Critics' Circle | 2011 | British Actress of the Year | Drive | Nominated | |
| London Film Critics' Circle | 2011 | British Actress of the Year | Shame | Nominated | |
| London Film Critics' Circle | 2015 | British Actress of the Year | Suffragette | Nominated | |
| London Film Critics' Circle | 2015 | British Actress of the Year | Far from the Madding Crowd | Nominated | |
| London Film Critics' Circle | 2023 | Actress of the Year | Maestro | Nominated | |
| London Film Critics' Circle | 2023 | British/Irish Performer of the Year | Maestro | Nominated | |
| London Film Critics' Circle | 2023 | British/Irish Performer of the Year | Saltburn | Nominated | |
| Los Angeles Film Critics Association | 2009 | Best Actress | An Education | Runner-up | |
| Los Angeles Film Critics Association | 2020 | Best Actress | Promising Young Woman | Won | |
| Michigan Movie Critics Guild | 2023 | Best Actress | Maestro | Nominated | |
| Minnesota Film Critics Alliance | 2023 | Best Actress | Maestro | Nominated | |
| New York Film Critics Circle | 2009 | Best Actress | An Education | 3rd place | |
| New York Film Critics Circle | 2011 | Best Supporting Actress | Shame | Runner-up | |
| New York Film Critics Online | 2020 | Best Actress | Promising Young Woman | Won | |
| North Texas Film Critics Association | 2022 | Best Supporting Actress | She Said | Nominated | |
| Online Film Critics Society | 2009 | Best Actress | An Education | Nominated | |
| Online Film Critics Society | 2011 | Best Supporting Actress | Shame | Nominated | |
| Online Film Critics Society | 2020 | Best Actress | Promising Young Woman | Nominated | |
| San Diego Film Critics Society | 2009 | Best Actress | An Education | Nominated | |
| San Diego Film Critics Society | 2010 | Best Actress | Never Let Me Go | Nominated | |
| San Diego Film Critics Society | 2011 | Best Supporting Actress | Shame | Nominated | |
| San Diego Film Critics Society | 2018 | Best Actress | Wildlife | Nominated | |
| San Diego Film Critics Society | 2020 | Best Actress | Promising Young Woman | Won | |
| St. Louis Gateway Film Critics Association | 2009 | Best Actress | An Education | Won | |
| St. Louis Gateway Film Critics Association | 2011 | Best Scene | Drive | Nominated | |
| St. Louis Gateway Film Critics Association | 2020 | Best Actress | Promising Young Woman | Won | |
| St. Louis Gateway Film Critics Association | 2022 | Best Supporting Actress | She Said | Nominated | |
| Toronto Film Critics Association | 2009 | Best Actress | An Education | Won | |
| Utah Film Critics Association | 2023 | Best Actress | Maestro | Nominated | |
| Washington D.C. Area Film Critics Association | 2009 | Best Actress | An Education | Won | |
| Washington D.C. Area Film Critics Association | 2009 | Best Breakthrough Performance | An Education | Nominated | |
| Washington D.C. Area Film Critics Association | 2011 | Best Supporting Actress | Shame | Nominated | |
| Washington D.C. Area Film Critics Association | 2020 | Best Actress | Promising Young Woman | Nominated | |
