= Lynn Barber =

British journalist (born 1944)

Lynn Barber (born 22 May 1944) is a British journalist who has worked for many publications, including The Sunday Times.

== Early life ==
Barber was born in Bagshot and attended Lady Eleanor Holles School in southwest London. While she was studying for her A-Levels she had a two-year relationship with a significantly older man, whom she knew as Alan Green, but who also called himself Alan Prewalski. He was an associate of Peter Rachman, and he deceived both Barber and her parents. In 2009, Barber wrote a memoir of the affair, An Education, which became the basis of a film of the same title.

Barber read English Language and Literature at St Anne's College, Oxford.

Lynn Barber's voice
Recorded July 2010 from the BBC Radio 4 programme Desert Island Discs

== Career ==
Barber worked for Penthouse for seven years until 1974, being successively editorial assistant, literary editor, features editor and deputy editor; she left to have children. From 1982 to 1989 she was a feature writer on the Sunday Express magazine, and she then joined The Independent on Sunday before its launch in 1990. Barber has also written for Vanity Fair, The Sunday Times, The Daily Telegraph and, from 1996 to 2009, The Observer.

Barber is best known for her interviews. Her 1990 interview and article on Jimmy Savile for The Independent on Sunday was the first to acknowledge in print early rumours that Savile was a paedophile and liked underage girls. She was once quoted by Will Self as describing her method as "start[ing] ... from a position of really disliking people, and then compel[ling] them to win you over." An interview with the conceptual artists Jake and Dinos Chapman was not a success, and she claims the Chapman Brothers have threatened to kill her if they ever meet again. Barber is also remembered for her 2001 article about a chaotic meeting with singer Marianne Faithfull.

Barber has won six British press awards. Her books include two collections of interviews, Mostly Men and Demon Barber, a sex book How to Improve Your Man in Bed, and a survey of Victorian popular natural history writers, The Heyday of Natural History.

In 2006, Barber was one of the judges for the Turner Prize and wrote an article in The Observer criticising some aspects of the judging process.

Barber's memoir of her teenage love affair, An Education, was published in June 2009. Its genesis was in a short piece on a similar theme that Barber wrote for the British literary magazine Granta. Nick Hornby adapted this short article as a film with the same title, made by BBC Films and released in October 2009, and available on video from March 2010. In the meantime Barber had expanded the Granta article into her memoir, too late for Hornby to use it as source material for the film.

In 2009, Barber returned to The Sunday Times to write for its magazine.

In July 2011, Barber was successfully sued by Sarah Thornton for libel and malicious falsehood over Barber's review of Seven Days in the Art World, published in The Daily Telegraph on 1 November 2008.

Barber's memoir of her career as an interviewer, A Curious Career, was published in May 2014.

== Personal life ==
While at Oxford, Barber was briefly in a relationship with Howard Marks, who would later become an infamous drug smuggler. Following the end of a different relationship, Barber met fellow student David Cardiff, whom she married in 1971. The couple had two daughters. Cardiff died in 2003.

== Awards ==
Barber was selected as Interviewer of the Year at The Press Awards in 1985, 1986, 1990, 1996, 2002 and 2012.
