= Carey Mulligan =

English actress (born 1985)

Carey Mulligan CBE
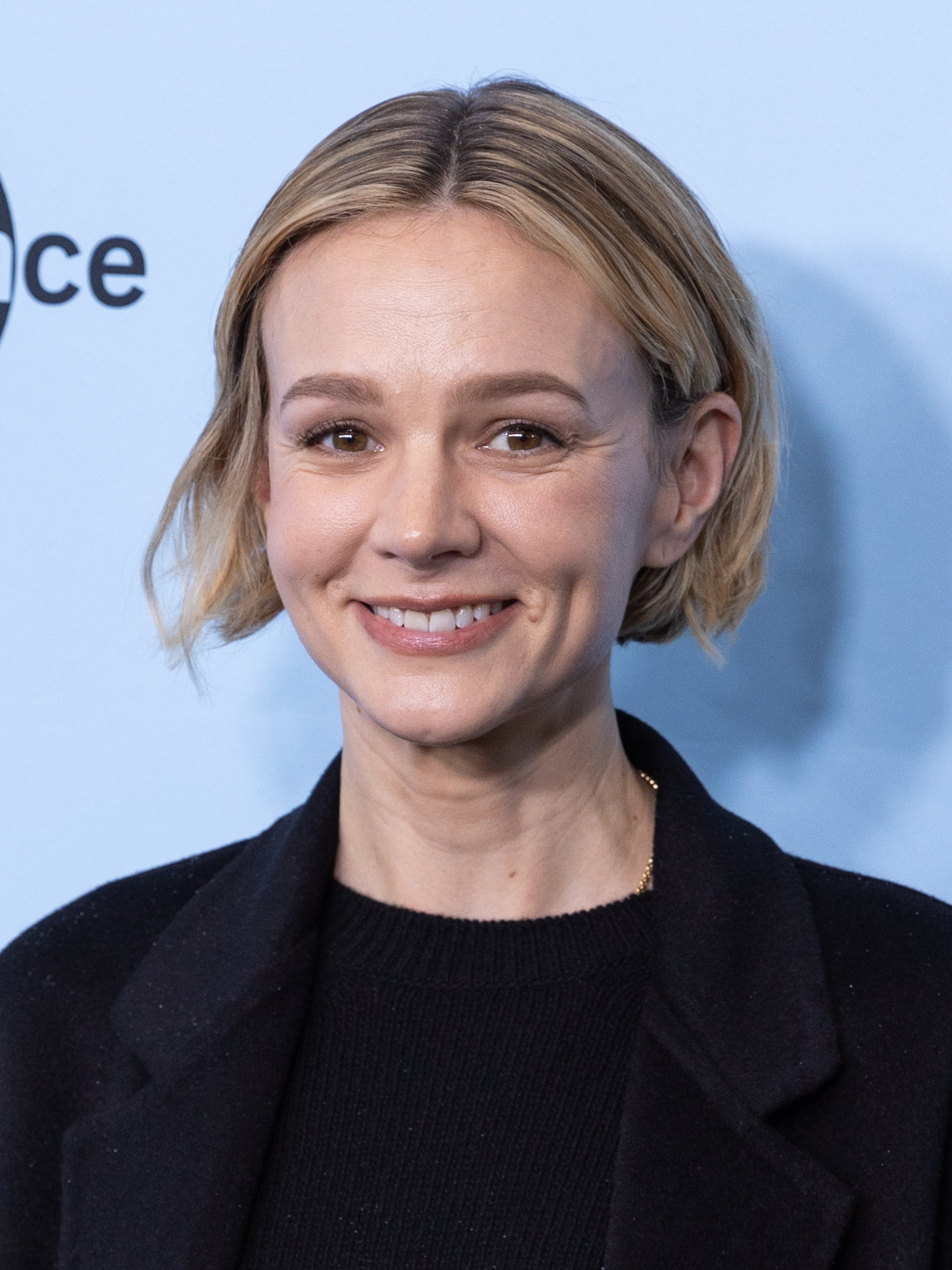
- Mulligan at the 2025 Sundance Film Festival
- Born: Carey Hannah Mulligan; 28 May 1985 (age 41); London, England
- Occupation: Actress
- Years active: 2004–present
- Works: Full list
- Spouse: Marcus Mumford (m. 2012)
- Children: 3
- Awards: Full list

Carey Hannah Mulligan (born 28 May 1985) is a British actress. Known for her performances on stage and screen, she has received numerous accolades, including a BAFTA Award, in addition to nominations for three Academy Awards, four Golden Globe Awards, two Primetime Emmy Awards and a Tony Award. She was appointed Commander of the Order of the British Empire (CBE) in 2025 for services to drama.

Mulligan made her film debut with a supporting role in Joe Wright's romantic drama Pride & Prejudice (2005) and has since received three Academy Award for Best Actress nominations for her roles as a 1960s schoolgirl in the coming-of-age film An Education (2009), a rebellious woman in the black comedy Promising Young Woman (2020) and Felicia Montealegre in the biopic Maestro (2023). She is also known for her roles in Never Let Me Go (2010), Drive (2011), Shame (2011), Inside Llewyn Davis (2013), Far from the Madding Crowd (2015), Suffragette (2015), Mudbound (2017), Wildlife (2018), and She Said (2022). Her highest-grossing release to date is the period drama The Great Gatsby (2013).

On television she has taken roles in the drama series Bleak House (2005), the television film Northanger Abbey (2007), and the Netflix / BBC series Collateral (2018). She starred in and served as a producer for the second season of the Netflix anthology series Beef (2026), for which she received two Primetime Emmy Award nominations for Outstanding Limited Series and Outstanding Lead Actress in a Limited Series or Movie.

On stage, Mulligan made her debut in Kevin Elyot's play Forty Winks (2004) at the Royal Court Theatre. She made her Broadway debut playing Nina in the 2008 revival of Anton Chekhov's The Seagull. She returned to Broadway playing a teacher confronted by a former lover in the revival of David Hare's Skylight (2015) for which she was nominated for the Tony Award for Best Actress in a Play.

Mulligan has been an ambassador for the Alzheimer's Society since 2012, and an ambassador for War Child since 2014. Since 2012 she has been married to singer-songwriter Marcus Mumford, with whom she has three children.

== Early life and background ==
Carey Hannah Mulligan was born on 28 May 1985 in London, England, to Nano (née Booth) and Stephen Mulligan. Her father, a hotel manager, is of Irish descent and is originally from Liverpool. Her mother, a university lecturer, is from Llandeilo, Wales. Her parents met while they were both working in a hotel in their twenties. In the television series My Grandparents' War (2019), Mulligan explored her maternal grandfather Denzil Booth's role as naval radar artillery officer on HMS Indefatigable at the Battle of Okinawa and then sailing into Tokyo Bay at the end of World War II. When Mulligan was three, her father's work as a hotel manager took the family to West Germany. While living there, she and her brother attended the International School of Düsseldorf. When she was eight, she and her family moved back to the UK. As a teenager, she was educated at Woldingham School, an independent school in Surrey.

Her interest in acting sparked from watching her brother perform in a school production of The King and I when she was six. During rehearsals, she pleaded with his teachers to let her be in the play. They let her join the chorus. While enrolled in Woldingham School as a teen, she was heavily involved in theatre. She was the student head of its drama department, performing in plays and musicals, conducting workshops with younger students, and helping mount productions. When she was 16, she attended a production starring Kenneth Branagh. His performance emboldened her and reinforced her desire to pursue a career in acting. She wrote Branagh a letter asking his advice. "I explained that my parents didn't want me to act, but that I felt it was my vocation in life", she has said. Branagh's sister replied: "Kenneth says that if you feel such a strong need to be an actress, you must be an actress." Mulligan's parents disapproved of her acting ambition and wished for her to attend a university like her brother. At age 17, she applied to three London drama schools instead of the universities she was expected to apply to, but was not invited to attend them.

During her final year at Woldingham School, screenwriter Julian Fellowes delivered a lecture at the school on the production of the film Gosford Park. Mulligan briefly talked to him after the lecture and asked him for advice on an acting career. Fellowes tried to dissuade her from the profession and suggested she "marry a lawyer" instead. Undeterred, she later sent Fellowes a letter in which she said she was serious about acting and that it was her purpose in life. Several weeks later, Fellowes's wife Emma invited Mulligan to a dinner she and her husband were hosting for young aspiring actors. It facilitated an introduction between Mulligan and a casting assistant that led to an audition for a role in Pride & Prejudice. She auditioned three times and was eventually cast as Kitty Bennet. During her late teens and early twenties, she worked as a pub barmaid and an errand-runner for Ealing Studios between acting jobs.

== Career ==
=== 2004–2008: Early work ===
In 2004, Mulligan made her stage debut in the play Forty Winks at the Royal Court Theatre in London. She made her film debut in Joe Wright's 2005 film adaptation of Jane Austen's novel Pride & Prejudice, portraying Kitty Bennet alongside Keira Knightley. Later that year, she was cast as orphan Ada Clare in the BAFTA award-winning BBC adaption of Charles Dickens' Bleak House, her television debut. In 2006, she appeared in BBC One's The Amazing Mrs Pritchard with Jane Horrocks.

Among her 2007 projects were My Boy Jack, starring Daniel Radcliffe; another Jane Austen adaptation, Northanger Abbey, starring Felicity Jones; and the Doctor Who episode "Blink", which won her the Constellation Award for Best Female Performance in a 2007 Science Fiction Television Episode. She rounded out 2007 by appearing in an acclaimed stage revival of The Seagull, in which she played Nina alongside Kristin Scott Thomas and Chiwetel Ejiofor. The Guardian called her performance "quite extraordinarily radiant and frank". While in the middle of the production, she had to have an appendectomy, which prevented her from performing for a week. For her debut Broadway performance in the 2008 American transfer of The Seagull, she was nominated for a Drama Desk Award, but lost to Angela Lansbury for Blithe Spirit.

=== 2009–2014: Breakthrough and rise to prominence ===
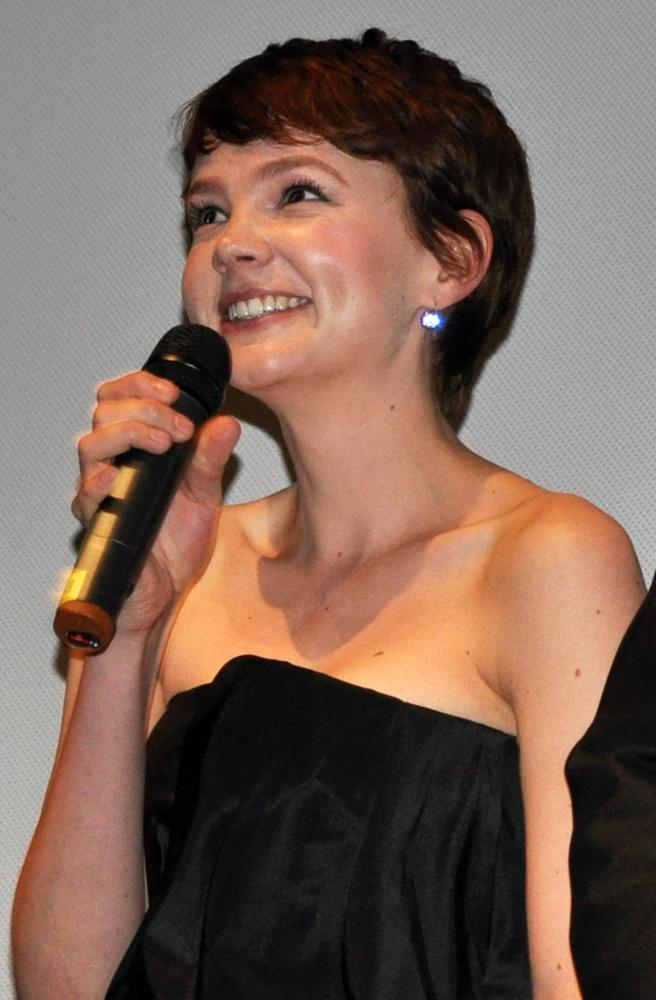
Mulligan at a Q&A for her film An Education (2009)

Her breakthrough came when, at 24, she was cast in her first leading role as Jenny, a teenage school girl seduced by an older man in the 2009 independent coming of age film An Education. The film was directed by Danish filmmaker Lone Scherfig and written by Nick Hornby. Over 100 actresses auditioned for the part, but Mulligan's audition impressed Scherfig the most. The film and her performance received rave reviews, and she was nominated for an Academy Award, Actor Award, Golden Globe, and Critics Choice for Best Actress, and won the BAFTA Award for Best Actress in a Leading Role. Lisa Schwarzbaum of Entertainment Weekly and Todd McCarthy of Variety both compared her performance to that of Audrey Hepburn. Rolling Stone's Peter Travers wrote that she gave a "sensational, starmaking performance". Mulligan was nominated for the BAFTA Rising Star Award, which is voted on by the British public.

In 2010, she was invited to join the Academy of Motion Picture Arts and Sciences, That same year she starred in Never Let Me Go, the film adaptation of Kazuo Ishiguro's acclaimed novel of the same name, alongside Keira Knightley and Andrew Garfield. She won a British Independent Award for her performance. That same year she starred in the Oliver Stone-directed film Wall Street: Money Never Sleeps. Screened out of competition at the 2010 Cannes Film Festival, it was her first major studio project. Later that year she also provided vocals for the song "Write About Love" by Belle & Sebastian.

She returned to the stage in the Atlantic Theater Company's off-Broadway play adaptation of Ingmar Bergman's Through a Glass, Darkly, from 13 May to 3 July 2011. Mulligan played the central character, a mentally unstable woman, and received glowing praise from reviewers. Ben Brantley, theater critic for The New York Times, wrote that Mulligan's performance was "acting of the highest order" and called her "extraordinary" and "one of the finest actresses of her generation". For her performance she was nominated for the Drama Desk Award for Outstanding Actress in a Play.

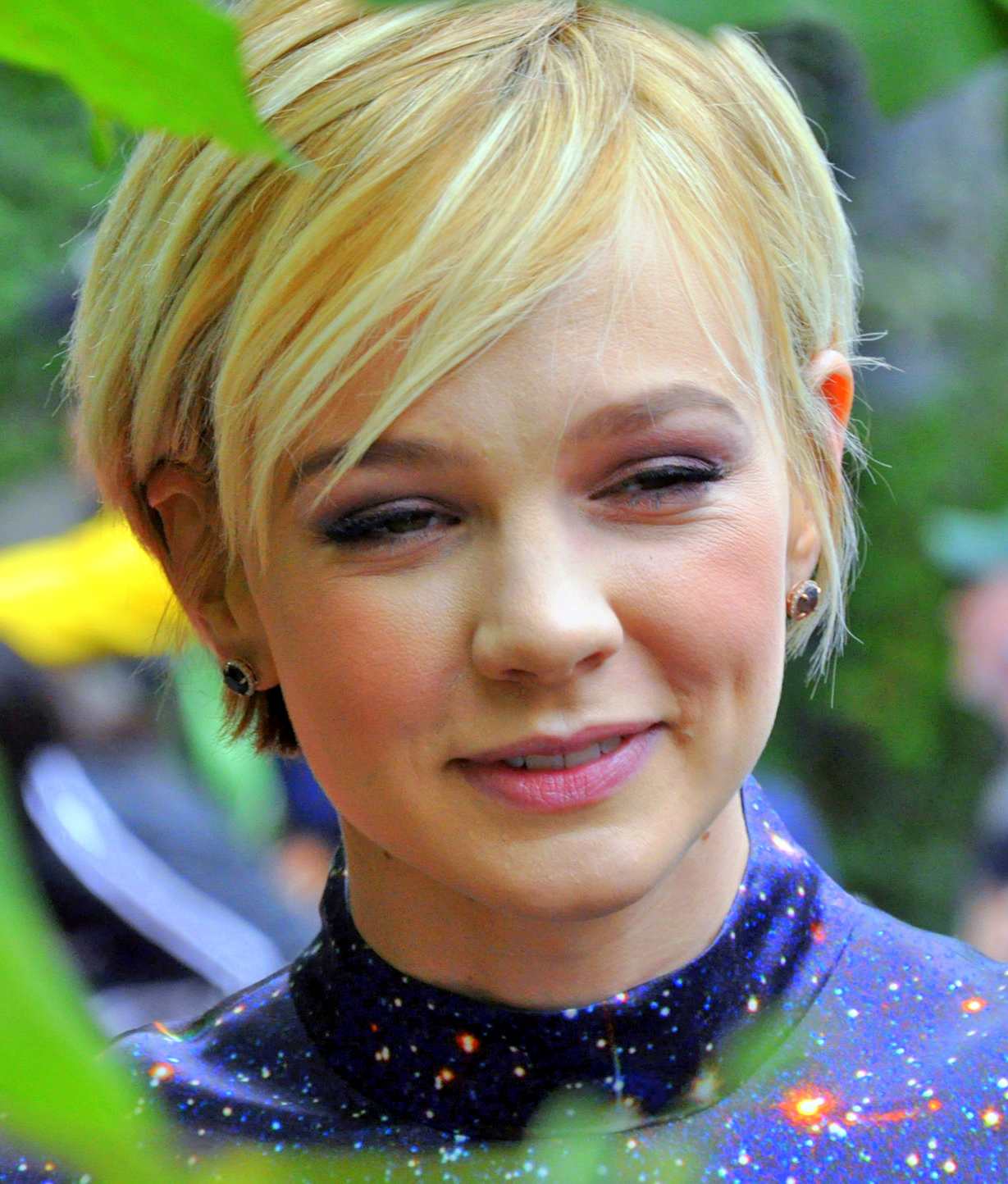
Mulligan at the 2010 Toronto International Film Festival

Mulligan co-starred in two critically acclaimed films in 2011. The first was Nicolas Winding Refn's Drive, with Ryan Gosling. The second film was Steve McQueen's sex-addiction drama Shame alongside Michael Fassbender. Both films were major film festival hits. Drive debuted at 2011 Cannes Film Festival and Shame debuted at 2011 Venice Film Festival, both to rave reviews. She received her second nomination for the BAFTA Award for Best Actress in a Supporting Role—for the film Drive which also garnered a total of 4 BAFTA award nominations, including Best Picture and Best Director.

In Shame she played the neurotic, unstable Sissy, the sister of the sex addict played by Michael Fassbender. For her performance, she received critical praise as well as a nomination for the BIFA for Best Supporting Actress. Todd McCarthy of The Hollywood Reporter wrote of her performance, "Exposing herself emotionally and physically as she never has before, Mulligan is terrific in this unexpected role of a deeply wounded and troubled soul."

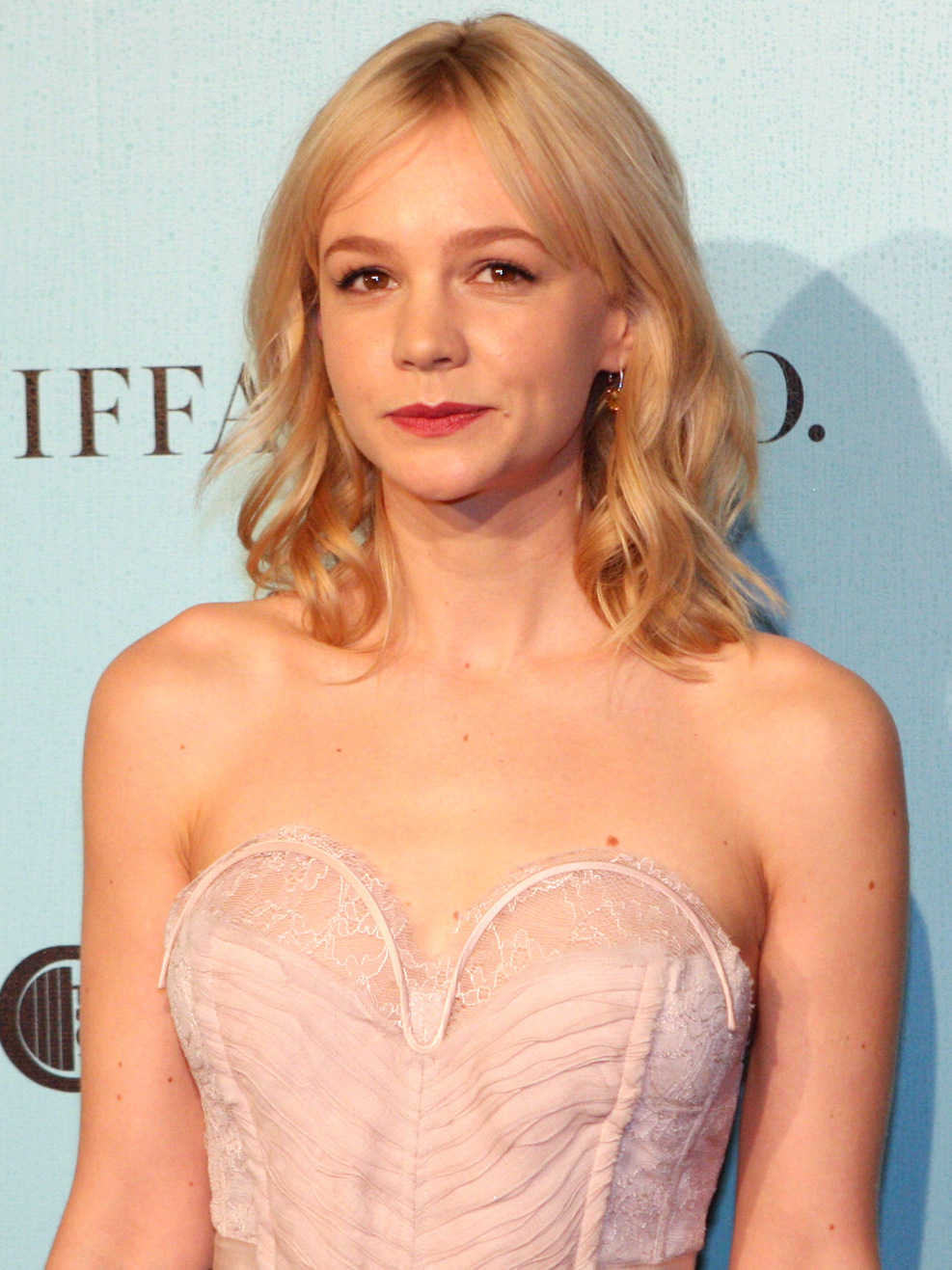
Mulligan at The Great Gatsby 2013 Premiere - Sydney, Australia

In 2013, she starred as Daisy Buchanan in Baz Luhrmann's The Great Gatsby opposite Leonardo DiCaprio, which was released in May 2013. Mulligan auditioned for the role in late 2010. While attending a Vogue fashion dinner in New York City in November, Baz Luhrmann’s wife, Catherine Martin, told her she had the part. In May 2012, she and Anna Wintour co-chaired the 2012 Met Ball Gala themed Schiaparelli and Prada: Impossible Conversations. In 2013, she also starred in Joel and Ethan Coen's black comedy Inside Llewyn Davis alongside Oscar Isaac and Justin Timberlake. The film premiered at the Cannes Film Festival to rave reviews. In the film she plays a folk singer. Peter Bradshaw of The Guardian called her and Timberlake's performances "outstanding".

In 2014, she returned to the stage, starring in the London revival of the David Hare play Skylight with Bill Nighy and Matthew Beard, directed by Stephen Daldry, at Wyndham's Theatre in London's West End. It won the 2014 Evening Standard Theatre Award for Revival of the Year and was nominated for the 2014 Olivier Award for Best Revival. She followed the production when it transferred to Broadway at the John Golden Theatre in April 2015. The transfer was a massive success with Marilyn Stasio of Variety declaring that the two central performances left the audience "breathless—and wondering how they can sustain this level of emotional intensity throughout the show’s 13-week Broadway run." The play won the Tony Award for Best Revival and she earned her first Tony Award nomination for Best Performance by a Leading Actress in a Play.

=== 2015–2019: Critical acclaim ===
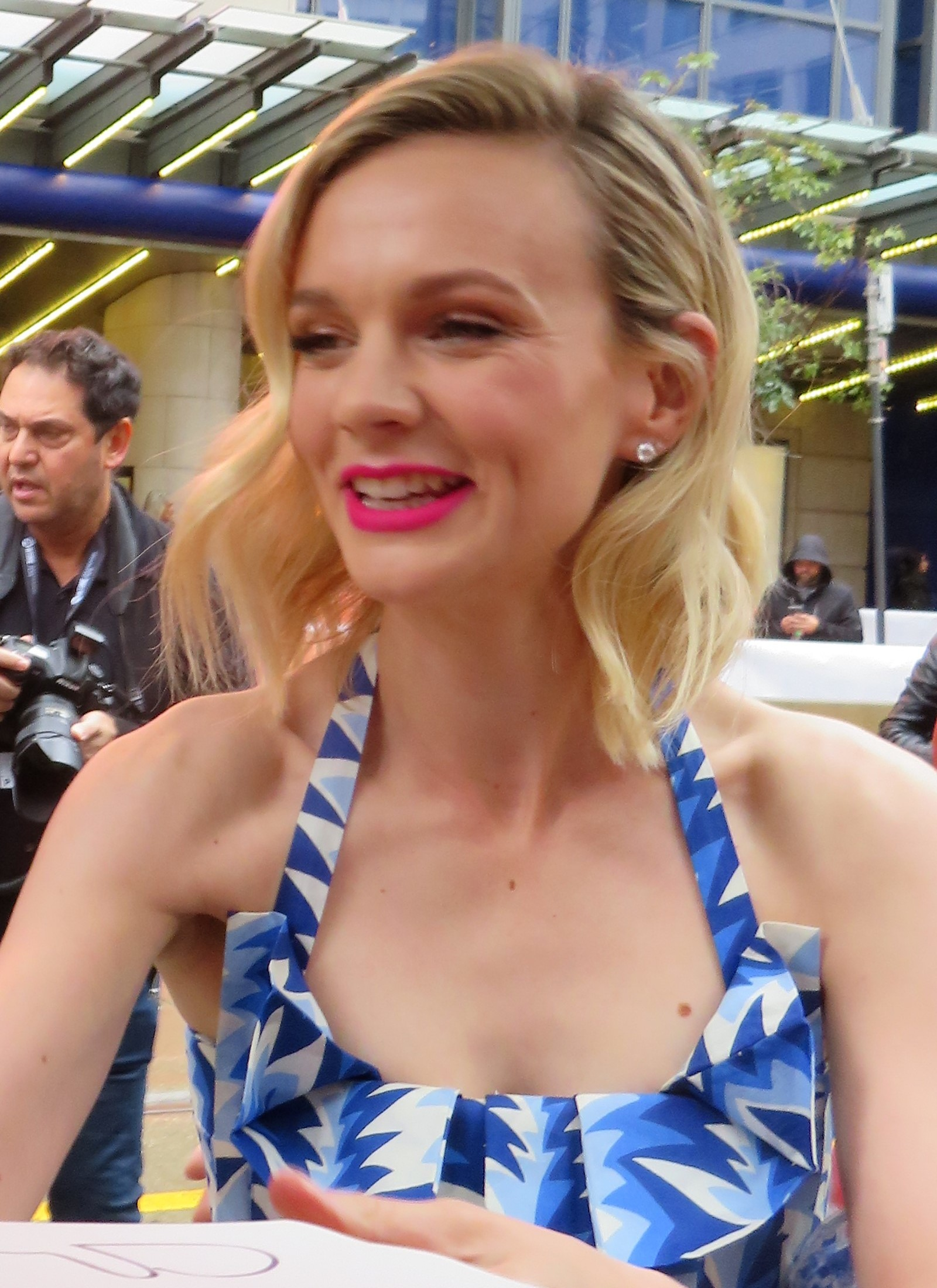
Mulligan attending the premiere of Wildlife at the 2018 Toronto International Film Festival

Mulligan continued to earn acclaim for her portrayal of a wide range of complex characters. In 2015, Mulligan starred in Thomas Vinterberg's film adaptation of Thomas Hardy's novel Far from the Madding Crowd with Matthias Schoenaerts, Tom Sturridge, and Michael Sheen, Anne Thompson of IndieWire wrote that her performance "proves that she can carry a movie" adding, "Carey Mulligan is excellent: her face has a pinched girlish prettiness combined with a shrewd, slightly schoolmistressy intelligence". In the fall of that year she starred in Sarah Gavron's Suffragette (2015) with Helena Bonham Carter, Ben Whishaw, Brendan Gleeson and Meryl Streep. Justin Chang of Variety called her "a standout", adding that she gave "an affecting, skillfully modulated performance".

In 2017, she starred in Netflix's Mudbound, directed by Dee Rees. The film was met with critical acclaim. On review aggregator Rotten Tomatoes, the film has an approval rating of 97% with the consensus reading, "Mudbound offers a well-acted, finely detailed snapshot of American history whose scenes of rural class struggle resonate far beyond their period setting." The film earned four Academy Award nominations including Best Adapted Screenplay for Rees.

In 2018, she starred in Paul Dano's directorial debut film Wildlife with Jake Gyllenhaal. The film was written by Dano and Zoe Kazan, and is an adaptation of Richard Ford’s novel of the same name. The film debuted at the 71st Cannes Film Festival and received rave reviews from critics. The film has earned a 94% on Rotten Tomatoes with the consensus reading, "Wildlife's portrait of a family in crisis is beautifully composed by director Paul Dano – and brought brilliantly to life by a career-best performance from Carey Mulligan." For her performance, Mulligan was nominated for the Independent Spirit Award for Best Female Lead.

Mulligan returned to television as a Detective Inspector in Collateral, a BBC Two limited series, receiving plaudits from American and British critics. Mulligan praised creator Sir David Hare for seamlessly accommodating her pregnancy into the script. Mulligan starred off Broadway in the solo show, Girls and Boys at the Minetta Lane Theatre. The show was written by Dennis Kelly and directed by Lyndsey Turner. Her performance was praised, with The New York Times calling it "perfection". She was nominated for the Drama Desk Award for Outstanding Solo Performance.

=== 2020–present: Established actress ===
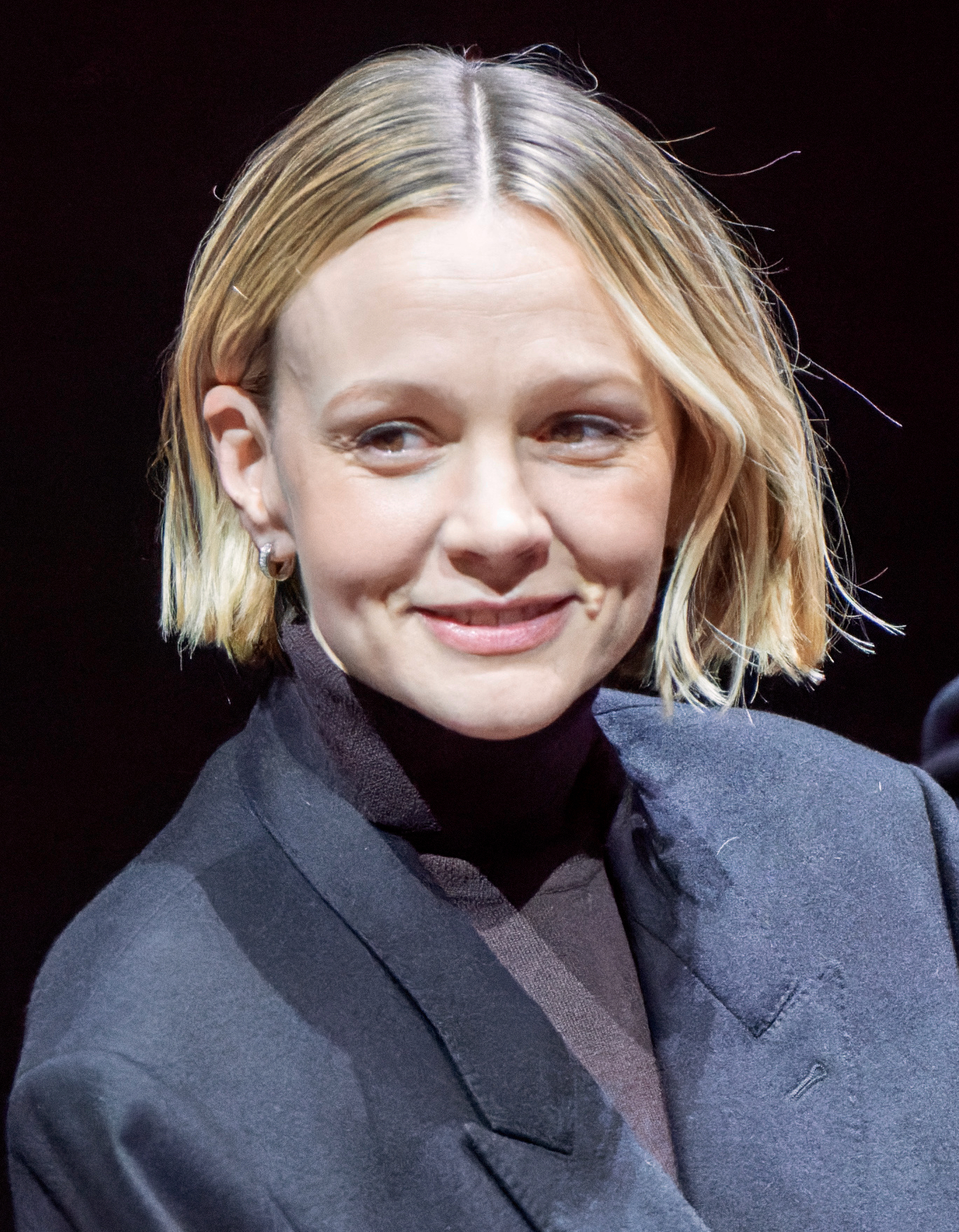
Mulligan at an event for Maestro in 2023

In 2020, Mulligan starred in Emerald Fennell's black comedy thriller film Promising Young Woman, alongside Bo Burnham and Alison Brie. She also served as an executive producer on the film, which debuted at the 2020 Sundance Film Festival to great acclaim. The website Rotten Tomatoes lists the film's rating as 90%, with a critics consensus reading, "A boldly provocative, timely thriller, Promising Young Woman is an auspicious feature debut for writer-director Emerald Fennell—and a career highlight for Carey Mulligan." Due to the COVID-19 pandemic the film's release was delayed to 25 December 2020. For her performance, she received her second nomination for the Academy Award for Best Actress and won the Critics' Choice Movie Award for Best Actress, among many other accolades. After winning Best Female Lead at the 36th Independent Spirit Awards, Mulligan dedicated her award to the late Helen McCrory.

In 2021, Mulligan replaced Nicole Kidman in The Dig, a film about the events of the 1939 excavation of Sutton Hoo, co-starring Ralph Fiennes and Lily James. It received a limited release in the United Kingdom, followed by a streaming release via Netflix. Mulligan's sole release of 2022 was She Said, based on the non-fiction book of the same name. She portrayed Megan Twohey, one of the real life New York Times reporters who broke the Harvey Weinstein scandal. For her performance, Mulligan received a Golden Globe nomination for Best Supporting Actress.

Mulligan then starred as Felicia Montealegre in Bradley Cooper's directorial Maestro (2023), a biopic about the relationship between Montealegre and her husband Leonard Bernstein (played by Cooper). David Rooney of The Hollywood Reporter particularly applauded Mulligan's "heartbreaking" performance, adding that she "has never been better". For her portrayal of Montealegre, she received her third nomination for the Academy Award for Best Actress, among other honours. She also played a small part in Fennell's second feature Saltburn, for which she was deemed a "scene-stealer" by Variety.

Her next release was an adaptation of the science fiction novel Spaceman of Bohemia for Netflix, co-starring Adam Sandler. The film had its world premiere at the 74th Berlin International Film Festival, and received mostly mixed reviews. Mulligan then starred in The Ballad of Wallis Island, a British comedy based on the short film The One and Only Herb McGwyer Plays Wallis Island. The film premiered at the Sundance Film Festival on January 25, 2025. It received acclaim from critics.

She voiced the main villain in Laika's stop motion animated feature Wildwood, based on the fantasy novel of the same name. Mulligan also stars in the second season of Netflix's anthology series Beef, alongside Oscar Isaac, Cailee Spaeny, and Charles Melton. In May 2025, she joined Greta Gerwig's The Chronicles of Narnia film adaptation, which is titled Narnia: The Magician's Nephew and based on the series' first novel.

== Personal life ==
=== Marriage and family ===
Mulligan dated Shia LaBeouf, with whom she co-starred in the film Wall Street: Money Never Sleeps, from 2009 to 2010.

In 2012, she married Marcus Mumford, the lead singer of Mumford & Sons. They were childhood pen pals who had lost touch and reconnected as adults. A few weeks after completing production on the film Inside Llewyn Davis, in which they were both involved, they married on 21 April 2012. They have three children.

=== Philanthropy ===
Aside from acting, Mulligan was among the actresses who took part in the Safe Project—each was photographed in the place she feels safest—for a 2010 series to raise awareness of sex trafficking. She donated the Vionnet gown she wore at the 2010 BAFTAs to the Curiosity Shop, which sells its donations to raise money for charity.

Mulligan became the ambassador of the Alzheimer's Society in 2012, with the goal of raising awareness and research funding for Alzheimers and dementia. Her grandmother lived with Alzheimer's disease for the final 17 years of her life, during which she no longer recognised Mulligan. She helped host and participated in the 2012 Alzheimer's Society Memory Walk and was one of the sponsored Alzheimer's Society runners in the 2013 Nike Run to the Beat half-marathon in London.

In 2014, Mulligan became an ambassador for the charity War Child and visited the Democratic Republic of Congo in this role.

== Acting credits and accolades ==
Mulligan has received numerous accolades, including a BAFTA Award and a Critics' Choice Movie Award, in addition to nominations for three Academy Awards, five Actor Awards, four Golden Globe Awards, and a Tony Award. She was appointed a Commander of the Order of the British Empire (CBE) in the 2025 New Year Honours for services to drama.
