= Constance Dollé =

French actress

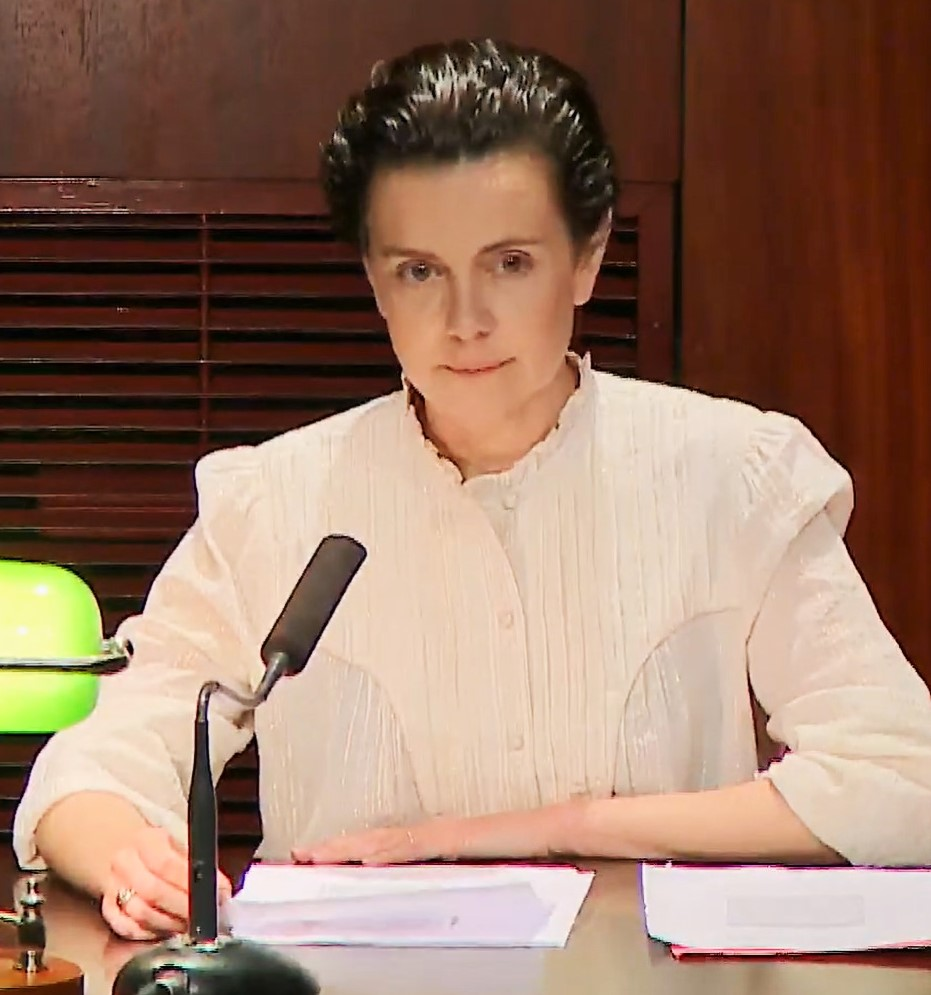
- Dollé reads fragments from Julien Gracq at the National Library of France in 2021
- Born: 1974 (age 51–52); France
- Occupation: Actress
- Years active: 1999-present

Constance Dollé (born 1974) is a French actress. She has appeared in more than forty films since 1999.

In 2019, she performed in a production of the one woman play Girls & Boys by Dennis Kelly at the Theatre du Petit Saint-Martin in Paris, receiving a Molière Award nomination for her performance.

== Selected filmography ==
Year	Title	Role	Notes
2005	Boudu		
2007	The Witnesses		
2013	Eyjafjallajökull		
2023	Coup de chance	Pauline	
