= Matthew Beard (English actor) =

English actor and model (born 1989)

- Born: 25 March 1989 (age 37); London, England
- Education: King Ecgbert School; University of York
- Occupation: Actor
- Years active: 1991–present

Matthew Beard (born 25 March 1989) is an English actor and model.

== Early life ==
Beard was born in London. He attended King Ecgbert School in Sheffield, achieving As in his A-Level subjects in 2007. He studied English and French literature at the University of York.

== Career ==
Beard made his feature film debut in the drama And When Did You Last See Your Father? in 2007. Other notable film roles include An Education (2009), The Imitation Game (2014), and The Party's Just Beginning (2018).

Beard's television roles include Max Lieberman in the BBC series Vienna Blood (2019–2024), and Deputy Alan Lewis in the HBO series Avenue 5 (2020).

In 2015 he joined Bill Nighy and Carey Mulligan in the David Hare play Skylight in the West End and on Broadway, earning a Tony Award nomination for best featured actor in a play. He starred as Edmund Tyrone in the 2018 revival of Long Day's Journey into Night in the West End and at the Brooklyn Academy of Music.

== Modelling ==
In 2011 he modelled for the English clothing label Burberry, and in 2015 he worked for Prada.

== Filmography ==
=== Film ===
Year	Film	Role	Notes
2007	And When Did You Last See Your Father?	Blake Morrison (Teen)	
2009	An Education	Graham	
2010	Chatroom	Jim	
2011	One Day	Murray Cope	
2013	The Look of Love	Howard Raymond	
2013	The Lovers	Matt	
2014	The Riot Club	Guy Bellingfield	
2014	The Imitation Game	Peter Hilton	
2016	Hippie Hippie Shake	Charles	Unreleased
2018	Elizabeth Harvest	Oliver	
2018	Johnny English Strikes Again	P	
2018	The Party's Just Beginning	Alistair	
2025	The Testament of Ann Lee	James Whittaker	
2026	Elsinore	Sean Mathias	

=== Television ===
Year	Film	Role	Notes
1991	Soldier Soldier	Matthew Wilton	3 episodes
1997–2002	Where the Heart Is	Various	3 episodes
2000	Big Meg, Little Meg	Freddie Johnson	5 episodes
2002	An Angel for May	Tom	Television film
2002–2004	Fat Friends	Lee McGary	2 episodes
2003	Sons and Lovers	Young Paul	Television film
2003	The Eustace Bros.	Sam Eustace	5 episodes
2004	The Royal	Peter Blackwood	Episode: "Reckoning"
2006	Johnny and the Bomb	Young Tom Maxwell	2 episodes
2008	The Royal Today	Luke Alexander	Episode #1.5
2008	Trial & Retribution	Andy Harper	Episode: "Tracks: Part 1"
2012	Labyrinth	Sajhe	2 episodes
2013	Rogue	Max Laszlo	7 episodes
2016	The Pity of War: the Loves and Lives of the War Poets	Wilfred Owen	ITV documentary drama
2018	Kiss Me First	Adrian	6 episodes
2019–2024	Vienna Blood	Max Liebermann	11 episodes
2020	Dracula	Jack	Episode: "The Dark Compass"
2020	Avenue 5	Deputy Alan Lewis	7 episodes
2022	Magpie Murders	James Taylor / James Fraser	6 episodes
2023–2024	Funny Woman	Bill Gardiner	10 episodes
2024	Monsieur Spade	George Fitzsimmons	6 episodes
2024	Moonflower Murders	James Taylor	2 episodes

=== Theatre ===
Year	Play	Role	Venue
2014	Skylight	Edward Sergeant	Wyndham's Theatre, West End
2015	Skylight	Edward Sergeant	John Golden Theatre, Broadway
2018	Long Day's Journey into Night	Edmund Tyrone	Wyndham's Theatre, West End
2018	Long Day's Journey into Night	Edmund Tyrone	Brooklyn Academy of Music, Brooklyn
2025	Boys on the Verge of Tears	7 characters	Soho Theatre
2026	Triumph	Marcus	Almeida Theatre

== Awards and nominations ==
In 2007, he was seen as teenage Blake in And When Did You Last See Your Father? His performance gained him rave reviews and saw him selected by Screen International as "A Star of Tomorrow" and a "Trailblazer" at the Edinburgh International Film Festival. He was also nominated for Best Newcomer at the British Independent Film Awards and Best Newcomer at the Evening Standard British Film Awards.

Year	Award	Category	Association	Result	Ref.
2007	British Independent Film Award	Most Promising Newcomer	And When Did You Last See Your Father?	Nominated	
2007	Evening Standard British Film Awards	Most Promising Newcomer	And When Did You Last See Your Father?	Nominated	
2014	Palm Springs International Film Festival	Best Ensemble Cast	The Imitation Game	Won	
2014	Screen Actors Guild Award	Outstanding Ensemble Cast in a Motion Picture	The Imitation Game	Nominated	
2015	Tony Award	Best Featured Actor in a Play	Skylight	Nominated	
