= Never Let Me Go (2010 film) =

2010 film by Mark Romanek

- Theatrical release poster
- Directed by: Mark Romanek
- Screenplay by: Alex Garland
- Based on: Never Let Me Go; 2005 novel by Kazuo Ishiguro
- Produced by: Andrew Macdonald; Allon Reich
- Starring: Carey Mulligan; Keira Knightley; Andrew Garfield; Ella Purnell
- Cinematography: Adam Kimmel
- Edited by: Barney Pilling
- Music by: Rachel Portman
- Production companies: DNA Films; Film4
- Distributed by: Fox Searchlight Pictures
- Release dates: 3 September 2010 (Telluride); 15 September 2010 (United States); 11 February 2011 (United Kingdom)
- Running time: 103 minutes
- Country: United Kingdom
- Language: English
- Budget: $15 million
- Box office: $9.9 million

Never Let Me Go is a 2010 British dystopian science fiction romantic drama film based on Kazuo Ishiguro's 2005 novel of the same name. The film was directed by Mark Romanek from a screenplay by Alex Garland. Never Let Me Go is set in alternative history and centres on Kathy, Ruth, and Tommy, portrayed by Carey Mulligan, Keira Knightley, and Andrew Garfield, respectively, who become entangled in a love triangle. Principal photography began in April 2009. Filming locations included Andrew Melville Hall and Forest School, Walthamstow. The film was produced by DNA Films and Film4 on a US$15 million budget.

Prior to the book's publication, Garland had approached Andrew Macdonald and Allon Reich about a possible film, and wrote a 96-page script. The producers initially had trouble finding an actress to play Kathy. Mulligan was cast in the role after Peter Rice, the head of the company financing the film, recommended her by text message while watching her performance in An Education. Mulligan, a fan of the book, enthusiastically accepted the role, as she had long desired to play the part. The film's message and themes were the factors that attracted Garfield to the film.

Never Let Me Go premiered at the 37th annual Telluride Film Festival in September 2010, where the audience responded positively to its message. The film was also screened at the 2011 Toronto International Film Festival, and it opened the 53rd London Film Festival. The film was distributed by Fox Searchlight Pictures to cinemas in the United States on 15 September 2010, where it was given a limited release. It opened on 14 January 2011 in the United Kingdom. In the United States, Never Let Me Go opened at four theatres, grossing over US$111,000 during its first weekend. The movie got off to a better start in its first weekend in the UK, earning £625,000 and taking ninth place at the box office.

Never Let Me Go earned US$9.5 million at the box office and an additional US$1.89 million in DVD sales revenue. Never Let Me Go was met with generally positive reviews from film critics, with most reviewers praising its portrayals.

== Plot ==
A medical breakthrough in the 1950s has, by the late 1960s, extended human lifespan beyond 100 years. In 1978, the young Kathy H, along with her friends Tommy D and Ruth C, spent their childhood at Hailsham, a traditional boarding school. The teachers, called guardians, encourage students to be health-conscious and create artwork, the best of which is accepted into The Gallery run by the mysterious Madame. They have little contact with the world beyond the school fences. Miss Lucy, a new guardian, tells her class they exist to be organ donors and are destined to die, or complete, early in their adulthoods; she is fired by the headmistress, Miss Emily. Kathy grows attracted to Tommy, but Ruth wins him for herself despite having teased him.

Seven years later, Kathy, Ruth, and Tommy, now young adults, are rehoused in the Cottages on a farm. They are allowed to drive on day trips, but remain reclusive, lacking social skills and resigned to their fate. They meet others from similar schools who claim that Hailsham students are privileged, and it is revealed that they are all clones. They discuss rumours of organ donations deferrals that might be granted to clones in love, and the nature of the people they were cloned from, called possibles, whom they unsuccessfully search for in books and out at the seaside. Tommy, still partnered with Ruth, is convinced that The Gallery serves as verification for deferrals since artwork reveals the soul, and he laments his lack of creativity. Ruth spites a lonely Kathy, claiming that Tommy never thought of her as more than a friend. Kathy leaves, enlisting as a post-operative carer for fellow clones.

Nine years on, Kathy has watched many donors gradually die as their organs are harvested. Having not seen Ruth or Tommy since she left the Cottages, she comes across Ruth, frail after two donations. They seek out Tommy to make a nostalgic seaside trip. Ruth reveals that she only seduced Tommy because she was afraid to be alone; she is consumed with guilt and wishes to help Tommy and Kathy seek a deferral. She leaves them with the address of Madame, who she believes has the power to help them, and later dies on the operating table. Kathy and Tommy enter a relationship, and Tommy explains to Kathy, now his carer, that he has been creating artwork in the hope of earning their deferral. The couple bring it to Madame, but she remains distant, and invites Miss Emily to speak. They reveal that deferrals are indeed a myth, and that the gallery was created to affirm the basic humanity of clones as an appeal for their ethical treatment. Hailsham, now shut down, was the last institution to value young clones as "all but human". Kathy and Tommy leave in silence, but Tommy explodes with grief and anger mid-journey, as he used to as a child. Tommy dies on his fourth donation, leaving Kathy alone as hers begin. Contemplating the ruins of her childhood, she questions in voice-over how different her life has been from that of normal people.

== Cast ==
- Carey Mulligan as Kathy H
  - Isobel Meikle-Small as young Kathy
- Keira Knightley as Ruth C
  - Ella Purnell as young Ruth
- Andrew Garfield as Tommy D
  - Charlie Rowe as young Tommy
- Sally Hawkins as Miss Lucy
- Charlotte Rampling as Miss Emily
- Nathalie Richard as Madame
- Domhnall Gleeson as Rodney
- Andrea Riseborough as Chrissie

== Themes ==
Director Mark Romanek has highlighted that everyone must clarify a relationship with their own mortality: either go against it or find a way around it, as the character Tommy does, the clones' acquiescence echoing aspects of original author Ishiguro's British Japanese background. Romanek hoped the audience of Never Let Me Go would be reminded of what is important: love, behaviour, and friendships. He recalled an email from one viewer: "I saw your film and it made me cry and I haven't reacted to a film emotionally like that in years. And I called my father, cause I realized I hadn't spoken to him in 3 weeks and I told him how much I love him and how much I appreciated what a good father he's been."

Andrew Garfield claims the story of Never Let Me Go to be about humans, and exploring "what it is to have a soul, and how you prove what a soul is"; he says he enjoys the way the film is a "call to arms" about the positives of life. He said that it could remind people that every morning they can choose whether to pursue their own activities, or do what they should do, or do what they are obliged to do. Keira Knightley feels that the film's story is alarming, but has said that the film is "more about humanity's ability to look the other way". "You know in fact that your morals can go out the window if you think you can survive in a certain way, whatever your morals may be."

Animal activist Jon Hochschartner draws parallels between clone farming and the commodity status of animals. The character Tommy compares the fate of clones to farmed animals: "I suppose you both heard that Hailsham is closed. The only schools left now—you hear they’re like battery farms," he says, suggesting that other institutions treat donor children exceptionally badly.

== Production ==
=== Development ===
Alex Garland, a long-time friend of Ishiguro, asked the author for the rights to the novel before he had finished reading it. Before the novel was published in 2005, Garland had already written a script for a possible film. He gave the screenplay to two producers, Andrew Macdonald and Allon Reich, and development started at that moment. "We are delighted to be shooting this special project, which Alex Garland first brought to us before the book's publication in 2005." The script for the film was 96 pages long and divided into chapters. Director Mark Romanek was originally attached to The Wolfman, but when he was dropped from that production for an unknown reason, he accepted the offer to work on Never Let Me Go. The movie was made into a dystopian drama. Romanek was glad to get the opportunity to shoot this film: "From the moment I finished [reading] the novel, it became my dream to film it. Ishiguro's conception is so daring, so eerie and beautiful. Alex Garland's adaptation is sensitive and precise. The cast is perfect, the crew superb." The Seattle Times observed that the project was "something of a departure" for the novelist, noting that it merges Ishiguro's signature "elegant prose with a decidedly science-fiction theme".

I toyed around with filming some futuristic buildings and stuff, but it never felt right. I wanted to make a love story.

— Mark Romanek

Garland, who has explored science fiction themes in his previous work, was a sounding board for ideas for the novel and an early reader of the book. Ishiguro stated that, despite Garland's screenwriting skills and previous experience with film, they did not discuss the idea of a film until after the novel was complete. "I try not to think about things like that when writing a novel—in fact, quite the reverse", he stated. He said that he attempts to "go for something... very interior, following thoughts and memories, something that I think is difficult to do on the screen, which is essentially a third-person medium." Thus he was surprised when Garland, after reading a complete version of the book, said he would like to try to adapt it. Ishiguro recalled that Garland wrote a draft very quickly and immediately asked for his opinion "as a first go". Ishiguro was very satisfied with Garland's screenplay—which was changed very little from its initial draft to the filmed version—and with the final film. When asked to compare the experience with that of The Remains of the Day, he acknowledged that both were more hands-on with this film. Romanek said that he did not make Never Let Me Go a science fiction film; rather, he was presenting a love story with fictional science context mixed in. He described the film as telling a "love story where the science fiction is this subtle patina on the story." The filmmaker explained that had they done the film with "science fiction-y things", it would have been more openly, with props such as futuristic structures and devices.

=== Casting ===
Carey Mulligan plays the narrator, Kathy, an introverted, observant character who projects both innocence and knowingness and who over the course of the story develops from a passionate, optimistic child to a wise and accepting young woman. Before her casting, Mulligan had already read the novel a few times, considering it a favourite. She recalled that from when she first read the book three years ago she had wanted to play Kathy. The young actress said that she could not "bear the idea of anyone else" portraying Kathy, although she acknowledged that she thought other people would be able to do a better performance. She was certain that someone would make a film adaptation of the novel and had hoped that they would wait until she was old enough to play the character. Romanek told The Los Angeles Times that he originally was having difficulty finding the right actress to play Kathy; a tight filming deadline loomed before Mulligan's casting. Peter Rice, the head of Fox Searchlight (the company financing the film) was watching An Education at the Sundance Film Festival in January. He wrote Romanek a four-word text message: "Hire the genius Mulligan." When later asked why the message was so abrupt, he explained that he was still in the middle of viewing the film. Rice exhibited what was described as a "rare foresight" in greenlighting a film with an almost unknown lead actress. "He just knew that she was it", said Romanek.

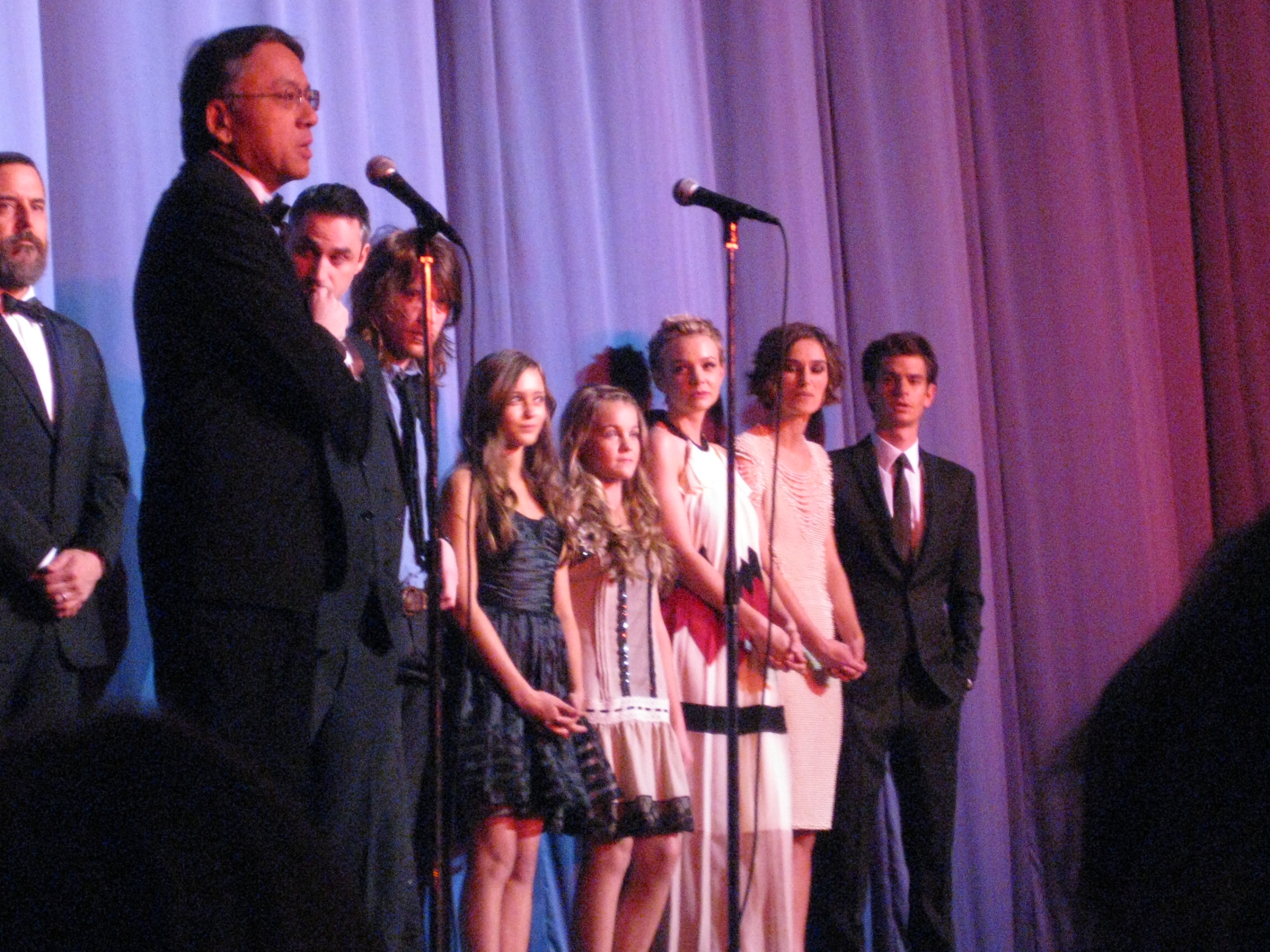
Romanek (far left), Ishiguro (front), Purnell, Meikle-Small, Mulligan, Knightley and Garfield at a screening of Never Let Me Go at the BFI London Film Festival

Andrew Garfield was cast as Tommy, a well-meaning, rather dim young person who struggles to find a place in an environment which values imagination and creativity above all. He said of his character, "There's a sense of anxiety that runs through these kids, especially Tommy, because he's so sensory and feeling and animalistic, that's my perspective of him." Garfield was attracted to the film based on its existential questions. He called the experience of being a part of Never Let Me Go a "dream come true". Garfield enjoys an opportunity to let loose with his roles. He said the scenes in which his character—unable to contain his frustration—erupts with a wail, was "intense" for him. "I think those screams are inside all of us, I just got a chance to let mine out". Before shooting the film, he had read the screenplay and the book. In March 2009 Daily Variety reported that Knightley was signed to the project. Knightley admitted that she only agreed to appear in Never Let Me Go because her friend Mulligan had asked her to. She portrays Ruth, a zealous, ambitious character who behaves manipulatively out of inner insecurity. When asked what she did and did not have in common with her character, Knightley said she was unable to relate to Ruth's situation of being involved in a love triangle.

The three lead characters do not have last names because "they are not normal people". Romanek believed that the three main characters act with great dignity. He noted that they are not materialistic or looking for power, but just desire to acknowledge their love for each other and stay close in their friendship. He cited how Ruth tries to seek redemption by attempting to set right a big mistake she had made. What he found the most moving aspect of the film was the "graceful place of acceptance that Kathy comes to at the end". Child actors Isobel Meikle-Small, Ella Purnell and Charlie Rowe play the younger versions of the story's lead actors. Sally Hawkins, who co-starred with Mulligan in An Education, had a supporting role as Miss Lucy, a teacher at an isolated English boarding school where the students slowly become aware that they are feared by people in the outside world. Charlotte Rampling portrays Miss Emily, a schoolmaster who presides over the orphanage at Hailsham. Richard was cast as the administrator, known as Madame, who is conducting a project to analyse the students' characters and psychologies, which has been compared to treating them as if they were subjects in an experiment. Riseborough's casting in Never Let Me Go was announced in April 2009.

=== Filming ===
Never Let Me Go was given a production budget of US$15 million. Principal photography for the film started in April 2009 and lasted a few weeks. Production design was done by Mark Digby, and Adam Kimmel was assigned to cinematography. The commercial director was Duncan Reid, who works for Ingenious Media, and the film was shot by English company DNA Films. On 8 May 2009, the production moved to Norfolk for filming. The beach at Holkham was used for filming; Knightley had shot scenes at nearby Holkham Hall for her 2008 film The Duchess. A location on Hill Road In Clevedon was used, and a shop was converted into a travel agency. They also filmed on the beach and the Victorian pier in Clevedon. The pier is featured on the film poster and the cover of the rereleased book. A large property on the Bexhill-on-Sea seafront was used on 12 and 13 May 2009 to act as the exterior for the residence of Madame, where Tommy and Kathy go to apply for a deferral.

Andrew Melville Hall in the University of St. Andrews was the setting for the Dover Recovery Centre. Nearly thirty film extras, film producers and location scouts had to wait several hours for the sun to set so they could film the scenes there. The restaurant scene, which is featured in the trailer and in promotional screenshots, was shot in the Regent Restaurant and Coffee Lounge in Weston-super-Mare in April 2009. Chiswick Town Hall, a dark building in London, was also used as a shooting location. The scenes where the Hailsham assemblies were held was filmed at Forest School in Snaresbrook in May 2009. Ham House, Richmond, was used for filming mostly exterior scenes at Hailsham School and a couple of interior scenes.

Romanek described working with child actors and "knowing that the first act of the film was going to have to be carried by 12-year-olds" as probably the most difficult aspect of making the film. He said that most of the rehearsal schedule was devoted to ensuring that the first act would be good. At rehearsals, the filmmaker would have the younger actors observe the older actors practice the first-act scenes. This had a double purpose: the older actors would have a memory of having played those scenes, while the child actors would get a better idea of how a more experienced actor would play their part. Romanek would then mix and match the actors (for example, Mulligan would do a scene with the child playing the younger Tommy). He also had them spend time together doing things like playing and talking. He took them to the school location and let them play games together so they could get a better idea of the layout of the place.

According to Mulligan, a problem during the production was that her role required her to drive: at the time she did not know how to drive or have a driver's license. She did a two-week intensive course to learn how to work a manual gear change so she could eventually film the driving scenes, but failed the driving test. "I'm really bad at it", she explained. "[I have] no hand and eye coordination." The production team ultimately had to shoot the scene on a private road, where she was allowed to get behind the wheel. The director had a hard time making Knightley look plain in the film; "It was difficult. She was eager and happy to do it because the role called for it. But even at her worst, Keira still looks astonishing".

When accessing the very deep emotions called for by her character, Mulligan stated, "I really took my cue from the book". She noted that her role did not require her to have much to say because Kathy was more of an observer throughout most of the film. She recalled that "every time I was in a scene where I wasn't quite sure where I was going with it, I would go to the book and read through the lines because she's unreliable, in that much of the time she's not being truly honest with herself or the audience." She said that her friendship with Knightley made their scenes together easier because they would both regard each other's comments helpful and would not feel "insulted or hurt" in discussion.

=== Music ===
British composer Rachel Portman scored Never Let Me Go. Portman employed a smaller orchestra consisting of 48 players, and used instruments such as piano, strings and harp, with solos for violin and cello, and recorded the score within four months. The score album was released on 14 September 2010 through Varèse Sarabande. Her work on Never Let Me Go earned her a San Diego Film Critics Society Award for Best Score.

The song "Never Let Me Go" that Kathy listens to in the film is from a cassette tape that Tommy gave her at Hailsham called Songs After Dark by 'Judy Bridgewater'. The album and singer are fictitious, but "Never Let Me Go" was written by Luther Dixon and sung by Jane Monheit.

== Promotion and release ==
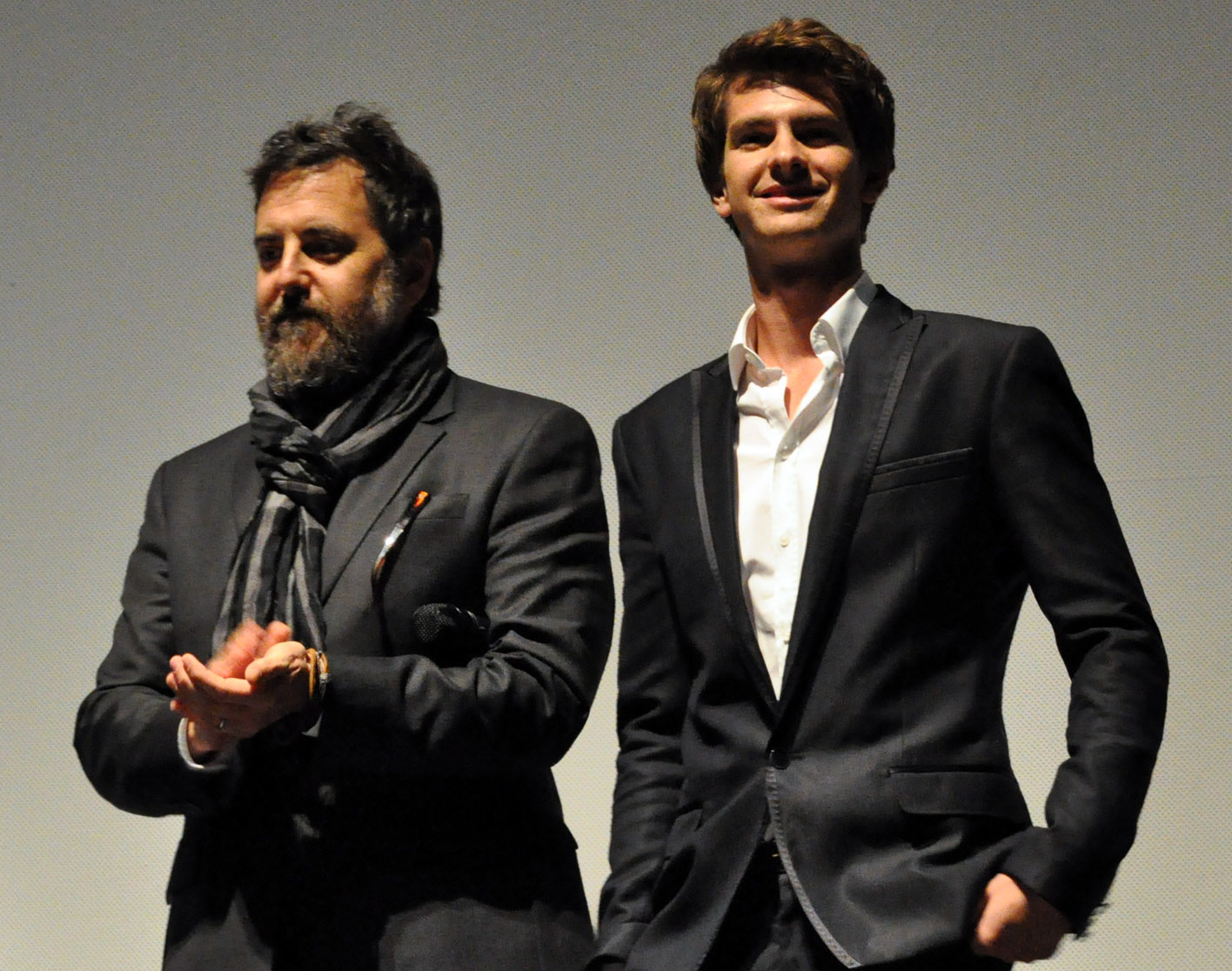
Romanek and Garfield at the screening of Never Let Me Go at the 2010 Toronto International Film Festival

In July 2010 Never Let Me Go was screened to film critics, who gave it generally positive reviews, with The Daily Telegraph calling the film's three leads "brilliant". Never Let Me Go premièred at the 37th annual Telluride Film Festival, presented by the National Film Preserve. The festival began on 3 September 2010, running through Labor Day in the remote Colorado town. The Hollywood Reporter observed that the audience "seemed to respond positively to the film's look at what makes us human and what defines a soul." The film was in the 35th Toronto International Film Festival (TIFF) line-up during September 2010, with 300 other films. Never Let Me Go was originally expected to have its world premiere at the 2010 Venice Film Festival in September, but Fox replaced it with Black Swan. They favored the TIFF over Venice, but eventually settled on the Telluride Film Festival.

In the same month, the film was screened during the 2010 Fantastic Fest in Austin, Texas. Never Let Me Go opened the 54th London Film Festival on 13 October 2010, the same day as its European release date. Never Let Me Go was the second film based on an Ishiguro novel to open the festival, after Merchant Ivory–Ismail Merchant's The Remains of the Day in 1993. Regarding the film's screening at the London Film Festival, Ishiguro said, "It is a fantastic privilege, I feel very lucky. To some extent it is a showcase for British talent and it's a tremendous honour". Describing Never Let Me Go as "accomplished and imaginative", Sandra Helborn, the London Film Festival Artistic Director, added that "It combines impeccable film making, outstanding performances, and a deeply moving story, and I couldn't wish for a stronger or more appropriate opening night". That same month it was also screened in competition at Japan's Tokyo International Film Festival. Six screenings of the film were held in the Little Theatre at Western Michigan University between 17–19 December 2010.

Never Let Me Go was scheduled for a limited release for select cities in the United States on 1 October 2010, but the date was later moved up to 15 September. The film was released in the United Kingdom on 11 February 2011, and in France on 9 February 2011. To promote the film, Mulligan appeared at movie screenings, including at the Landmark Theatres and AMC Loews Lincoln Square. After the Telluride Film Festival, the Los Angeles Times called the film an "Oscar wild card". He believed its reviews were "likely to be split between those who consider the film a bleak masterpiece and others who find it straining so mightily for aesthetic perfection that it fails to provide a gripping narrative." The Globe and Mail called Never Let Me Go one of 2010's "big noise" films. In the United States, Never Let Me Go was released on DVD on 1 February 2011. By 6 February, it had sold 44,911 units (amounting to US$628,305 in consumer revenue) and was the 17th-best-selling DVD for that week. The DVD and Blu-ray sales revenue stands at US$3,794,951.

== Reception ==
=== Box office ===
In its opening weekend in the United Kingdom, between 11–13 February 2011, it took ninth place at the box office. Playing on 265 screens, it took in an estimated £625,000, which the British press considered disappointing. In its second week its box-office revenue decreased by 45%, to £338,404. Never Let Me Go has made a total of US$9.90 million worldwide.

Never Let Me Go was released in four cinemas in its opening weekend in the United States, with an additional 163 theatres added to its run later on. The film became the number-one screening at these four theatres on its opening day and grossed slightly over US$44,500 from those select screenings. In its opening weekend, the film made over US$111,700, averaging US$30,250 per theatre, taking 42nd place at the box office. In its succeeding week, revenues for Never Let Me Go saw a 117% increase, making about US$241,000, with an average of nearly US$9,500 per theatre. It was the 28th-highest-grossing film at the box office for that week. By its third week of release, the film suffered a revenue decrease to around US$188,000, despite being screened at more theatres than the previous week. After one month of release, it pulled in US$350,000, increasing nearly 90 percent from its previous weekend.

According to a news piece published by the Los Angeles Times on 21 October, by its fifth week of release the film was an "undeniable disappointment" commercially. The publication noted that when its release widened to over 200 theatres the previous weekend its per-theatre average was so low that its distributor decided to cut its screens in the succeeding weeks. Based on answers from film experts and executives for Fox Searchlight, there were five factors to why the film commercially disappointed: its timing, airing too early in the year when lighter summer fare is still popular; a novel that is particularly difficult to adapt; mixed reviews from critics; its depressing tone; and its lack of appeal to male viewers. In the following weeks Never Let Me Go began to gross under US$100,000 per weekend, going on to earn US$2.5 million in the US by the second week of December.

=== Critical response ===
Never Let Me Go received generally positive reviews from critics, with the cast's performances being praised. On review aggregator Rotten Tomatoes, the film holds a 71% approval rating based on 186 reviews, with an average rating of 6.8/10. The website's critical consensus reads, "Mark Romanek has delivered a graceful adaptation that captures the spirit of the Ishiguro novel—which will be precisely the problem for some viewers." Metacritic assigned the film a weighted average score of 69 out of 100, based on 37 critics, indicating "generally favorable reviews".

David Gritten of The Daily Telegraph saluted the film, applauding the production and the performances of its supporting cast. Saul Austerlitz of the Boston Globe felt that the film struck a "mournful note" and believed that certain images in the film, such as a tree in an empty field, "possess a haunting power directly lifted from the best of Romanek's video work", while respecting the themes in Ishiguro's novel.

The Hollywood Reporter critic Jay A. Fernandez said that Never Let Me Go was an engaging film, but he thought that its overall impact was not as emotionally devastating as the book. Cleveland Magazine's Clint O'Connor strongly approved the acting performance of Garfield, and Eric Kohn from IndieWire praised Garland’s script and Kimmel’s photography.

Chris Knight of the National Post wrote that the film was able to capture the wistfulness and the unpredictable tone of Ishiguro's novel, but added that it "spills the beans much sooner". Mark Jenkins of NPR called Never Let Me Go a "remarkably successful adaptation" of Ishiguro's book, but acknowledged that Romanek and Garland "do make a few missteps", which were mostly the result of the limitations imposed by turning the novel's contents into a film. Entertainment Weekly film critic Owen Gleiberman described the film as feeling like a "period piece" and rated it a C+. Reuters's Stephen Farber called the film a disappointment, because although it was "expertly acted, impeccably photographed, intelligently written" and "even intermittently touching", Never Let Me Go is "too parched and ponderous to connect with a large audience"; he said the film should have laid out more completely the logic of its parallel universe, such as the cloning process, and he thought the film had a "theme" of "the dangers of medical experimentation", which he found "rather tired".

Slant writer Ed Gonzalez gave the film a two-out-of-four-star rating, saying the characters' actions do not feel "appropriately warped" while the interactions between the teachers and students is not "at all rife with the what-are-they-thinking-about-us mystery of the book". Andrew O'Hehir of Salon.com wrote that Romanek "does so many difficult things beautifully in this movie". He thought the film carried a reminder that life is short regardless of how long it lasts rather than a "lecture about the horrors of human history". Tom Preston from The Guardian described Mulligan and Garfield's acting as solid, while commenting that Knightley's emotional performances are occasionally jarring. He said that although the film finely demonstrated subtlety, its screenplay could have been written with less compression in some parts. Writing in Newsweek, Louisa Thomas praised the film for its beauty and its performances but declared that "there's something just missing here."

Marshall Fine of The Huffington Post noted that like the novel, the film is difficult to embrace. He said that the film does work on a "suspense level", due to Romanek's creating a "quiet, leisurely pace that would not be out of place in a yoga class". He stated that he "no doubt was aiming for an eerie, Children of the Damned vibe, except that it's the children who are damned". The writer concluded that Never Let Me Go's final result is a "staid, lifeless tale that never talks about what it's about, or at least not enough to provoke deep thoughts on the subject." Film critic Rex Roberts of Film Journal International thought the film was moderately surprising given Romanek and Garland's previous work, saying that they "show real affinity for the subtle shades of resignation and quiet desperation that characterize Isighuro's [sic] prose and, as would be expected, accentuate the unsettling eeriness that pervades Never Let Me Go". Roberts felt that Mulligan and Knightley were not convincing in portraying their ages until the last third of the movie.

Christy Lemire stated that the film was a "gorgeous, provocative look at humanity" and observed that like its characters, the film "demands much of its audiences emotionally". She concluded that Never Let Me Go is worth the investment. Los Angeles Times film critic Kenneth Turan thought that the film was "passionate about deliberation and restraint" and believed that the latter may not appeal to all audiences. Scott Bowles, writing for USA Today, gave the film a negative review, declaring "never was a movie so bleak and empty". He claimed that Never Let Me Go did not "embrace the book's unrelentingly dark tones", but rather wallowed in them. He commented that not even the cast's performance, particularly Garfield's, was enough to redeem the film. New York Times journalist Manohla Dargis said that the film presented "the aspect of a tasteful shocker" because its "cruelty is done so prettily and with such caution that the sting remains light".

=== Accolades ===
Award	Date of ceremony	Category	Recipients	Result
Alliance of Women Film Journalists	10 January 2011	Most Beautiful Film	Never Let Me Go	Nominated
British Independent Film Awards	5 December 2010	Best British Independent Film	Never Let Me Go	Nominated
British Independent Film Awards	5 December 2010	Best Director	Mark Romanek	Nominated
British Independent Film Awards	5 December 2010	Best Screenplay	Alex Garland	Nominated
British Independent Film Awards	5 December 2010	Best Actress	Carey Mulligan	Won
British Independent Film Awards	5 December 2010	Best Supporting Actor	Andrew Garfield	Nominated
British Independent Film Awards	5 December 2010	Best Supporting Actress	Keira Knightley	Nominated
Detroit Film Critics Society	16 December 2010	Best Actress	Carey Mulligan	Nominated
Detroit Film Critics Society	16 December 2010	Breakthrough Performance	Andrew Garfield (Also for The Social Network)	Nominated
Evening Standard British Film Awards	7 February 2011	Best Actor	Andrew Garfield (Also for The Social Network)	Won
Evening Standard British Film Awards	7 February 2011	Best Screenplay	Alex Garland	Nominated
Hollywood Film Festival	25 October 2010	Hollywood Film Festival for Best Breakthrough Performance	Andrew Garfield (Also for The Social Network)	Won
Independent Spirit Awards	26 February 2011	Best Cinematography	Adam Kimmel	Nominated
London Film Critics' Circle	10 February 2011	British Actor of the Year	Andrew Garfield	Nominated
Palm Springs International Film Festival	8 January 2011	Breakthrough Performance Award	Carey Mulligan (Also for Wall Street: Money Never Sleeps)	Won
Saturn Awards	23 June 2011	Best Science Fiction Film	Never Let Me Go	Nominated
Saturn Awards	23 June 2011	Best Actress	Carey Mulligan	Nominated
Saturn Awards	23 June 2011	Best Supporting Actor	Andrew Garfield	Won
Saturn Awards	23 June 2011	Best Supporting Actress	Keira Knightley	Nominated
Saturn Awards	23 June 2011	Best Writing	Alex Garland	Nominated
San Diego Film Critics Society	14 December 2010	Best Actress	Carey Mulligan	Nominated
San Diego Film Critics Society	14 December 2010	Best Score	Rachel Portman	Won
Women in Film and Television Awards	3 December 2010	Best Performance	Carey Mulligan (Also for An Education)	Won

== See also ==
- List of British films of 2010
