= My Grandparents' War =

Channel 4 TV series

My Grandparents' War is a 2019 British Channel 4 television series made to commemorate the 80th anniversary of the start of World War II, which follows the wartime stories of the grandparents of famous British people. It has four episodes and was first broadcast in November 2019. A second series comprising four episodes aired during the autumn of 2022.

== Series 1 ==
- Episode 1 - Helena Bonham Carter
- Episode 2 - Mark Rylance
- Episode 3 - Kristin Scott Thomas
- Episode 4 - Carey Mulligan

== Series 2 ==
- Episode 1 - Kit Harington
- Episode 2 - Keira Knightley
- Episode 3 - Emeli Sandé
- Episode 4 - Toby Jones
