= Far from the Madding Crowd (2015 film) =

British romantic drama film

- Official British poster
- Directed by: Thomas Vinterberg
- Screenplay by: David Nicholls
- Based on: Far from the Madding Crowd by Thomas Hardy
- Produced by: Andrew Macdonald; Allon Reich
- Starring: Carey Mulligan; Matthias Schoenaerts; Michael Sheen; Tom Sturridge; Juno Temple
- Cinematography: Charlotte Bruus Christensen
- Edited by: Claire Simpson
- Music by: Craig Armstrong
- Production companies: Fox Searchlight Pictures; BBC Films; DNA Films
- Distributed by: Fox Searchlight Pictures
- Release dates: 17 April 2015 (Istanbul Film Festival); 1 May 2015 (United Kingdom, United States)
- Running time: 119 minutes
- Country: United Kingdom
- Language: English
- Budget: £12 million
- Box office: $30.6 million

Far from the Madding Crowd is a 2015 British romantic drama film directed by Thomas Vinterberg and starring Carey Mulligan, Matthias Schoenaerts, Tom Sturridge, Michael Sheen, and Juno Temple. An adaptation by David Nicholls of the 1874 novel Far from the Madding Crowd by Thomas Hardy, it is the fourth film adaptation of the novel.

== Plot ==
In 1870 in Britain, while working on her aunt's farm in Dorset, Bathsheba Everdene meets neighbouring farmer, Gabriel Oak. He eventually proposes, but the headstrong Bathsheba declines, saying she is too independent. One night, Gabriel's new sheepdog herds his entire flock off a steep cliff. Penniless, Gabriel leaves to search for work. In contrast, Bathsheba inherits an uncle's farm and leaves to run it.

While at a fair trying to find employment, Gabriel sees soldiers recruiting. A girl there, Fanny Robin, points out one soldier, Sergeant Frank Troy, her sweetheart. She suggests Gabriel seek employment at a farm in Weatherbury. Upon Gabriel's arrival, several buildings are on fire. He saves the barn from destruction. At dawn the next day, he meets the farm's new mistress, Bathsheba, who hires him as a shepherd.

While in town trading her grain, Bathsheba sees her neighbour William Boldwood, a prosperous and mature bachelor. Bathsheba sends Boldwood a Valentine as a joke. He is both offended and intrigued. In the meantime, Fanny goes to the wrong church for her wedding; Troy, believing he's been jilted, is devastated. Boldwood comes to speak to Bathsheba, sees her handling sheep, and is charmed. He invites her to his home, where he proposes marriage. Bathsheba delays giving him a final answer, and Gabriel admonishes her for toying with Boldwood's affections. Stung by the criticism, she fires him. The next day, a crisis arises with the sheep that only Gabriel can manage. She successfully persuades him to return.

Bathsheba meets Frank Troy, who expresses admiration for her; the next day he returns to help with the harvest. He flirts with Bathsheba and arranges a secret meeting. At their rendezvous in the woods, he shows off his swordplay, telling her not to flinch as he swings his sword. He embraces her passionately and Bathsheba is left in a daze. Gabriel warns her against Troy, but she elopes with him. Returning to the farm, the newly married couple celebrate with all the workers and Troy begins to show his bad side. When Gabriel seeks help to protect the hayricks from an approaching storm, Troy, belligerent and drunk, refuses to take him seriously. Gabriel single-handedly tries to cover the harvest with tarpaulins and Bathsheba, ashamed of Troy's drunken behaviour, comes out into the stormy weather to help. Chastened, she tells Gabriel that she was a fool to fall prey to Troy's flattery.

One day in town, Troy sees Fanny begging. She tells him of her error on their wedding day, and reveals that she is pregnant. He sends her to the workhouse while promising to care for her. When he asks Bathsheba for £20, she refuses, annoyed by his gambling. Fanny and her baby die in childbirth; their coffin is delivered to Bathsheba's farm, Fanny's last known address. The words "Fanny Robbin and child" are written on the coffin, but Gabriel surreptitiously erases "and child" while bringing it in. Bathsheba recognises Fanny's name, notices the erasure, opens the coffin, and discovers the mother and baby within. When Troy returns, he bends over the coffin and kisses Fanny's lips. When Bathsheba protests, he responds that even in death Fanny means more to him than Bathsheba ever could. In grief he goes to the beach. He strips off his uniform and swims far into the sea and is believed drowned.

Left with Troy's gambling debts, Bathsheba worries she may lose the farm. Boldwood offers to buy it and merge it with his property, offering Gabriel a position as bailiff. He again proposes to Bathsheba, who agrees to consider his offer. On the eve of the Christmas party he plans to throw, Boldwood tells Gabriel that he is aware of Gabriel's feelings for Bathsheba. He shows Gabriel the engagement ring he plans to offer her. At the party, Boldwood graciously invites Gabriel and Bathsheba to dance together; she again asks Gabriel what she should do, and he answers that she should "Do what is right." Leaving the dance, she discovers Troy outside, alive and well. Rescued from drowning, he faked his death for some weeks. He demands money from Bathsheba, claiming it was unfair that he gave up his profession and now lives off nothing while she has money and a house. Troy grabs her roughly, yelling that she is still his wife and must obey him. Enraged, Boldwood emerges from the house and kills Troy with a single blast from his double-barrelled shotgun, for which he is promptly imprisoned. Gabriel reassures Bathsheba that if it's any consolation Boldwood is bound to be spared his life, for acting in a 'crime of passion'.

Some time later, Gabriel announces that since the farm is now secure, he'll be emigrating to America in four days' time. As he leaves on foot early in the morning, Bathsheba chases after him on horseback and begs him not to leave, thanking him for all he's done for her, and always believing in her. Gabriel asks her if she would agree were he to propose again. Bathsheba smiles and tells him he needs ask but once more. Gabriel kisses her passionately in response, and they walk back hand in hand.

== Cast ==
- Carey Mulligan as Bathsheba Everdene
- Matthias Schoenaerts as Gabriel Oak
- Michael Sheen as William Boldwood
- Tom Sturridge as Sergeant Frank Troy
- Juno Temple as Fanny Robbin
- Jessica Barden as Liddy
- Sam Phillips as Sergeant Doggett
- Tilly Vosburgh as Mrs. Hurst
- Harry Peacock as Jan Coggan
- Victor McGuire as Bailiff Pennyways
- Jody Halse as Farmer Stone
- Bradley Hall as Joseph Poorgrass

== Production ==
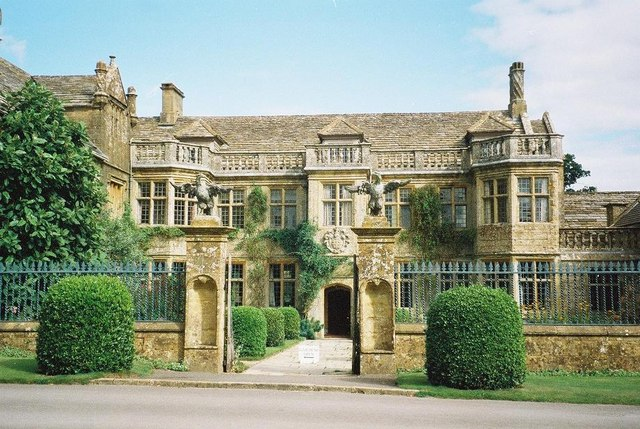
Mapperton House doubled as Bathsheba Everdene's farm

David Nicholls became attached to the film in 2008. Matthias Schoenaerts was offered the role of Gabriel Oak alongside Carey Mulligan as Bathsheba Everdene. Their casting was official in May 2013 with the participation of director Thomas Vinterberg.

Principal photography started on 16 September 2013. The film was shot in Dorset (Sherborne, Mapperton, and Beaminster), Oxfordshire, Buckinghamshire and London.

Mulligan claimed, in an appearance on The Graham Norton Show, that she hand-picked Schoenaerts to play Gabriel Oak after she saw him in the French film Rust and Bone.

Thomas Vinterberg invented the scene in which Sergeant Troy clutches Bathsheba's crotch after the sword tricks because he wanted it to get more drastically sexual. The British crew called it 'the Danish handshake'. Vinterberg suggested that he would have gone much further if it had been a Danish film.

== Release ==
The film was released on 1 May 2015.

The first teaser trailer debuted on 23 November 2014. It features the song "Let No Man Steal Your Thyme" performed by Carey Mulligan and Michael Sheen. A teaser poster was also revealed to mark the 140th anniversary of the novel of the same name.

== Reception ==
=== Box office ===
Far from the Madding Crowd grossed $12.2 million in North America and $18.4 million in other territories for a worldwide total of $30.6 million.

=== Critical response ===
Far from the Madding Crowd received positive reviews from critics. On Rotten Tomatoes, the film has a rating of 84%, based on 193 reviews, with an average rating of 7.3/10. The website's critical consensus reads, "Far from the Madding Crowd invites tough comparisons to Thomas Hardy's classic novel – and its previous adaptation – but stands on its own thanks to strong direction and a talented cast." Metacritic gave the film a score of 71 out of 100, based on 40 critics, indicating "generally favorable reviews".

Carey Mulligan's performance was critically praised and some considered it better than the 1967 adaptation starring Julie Christie. Rolling Stone's Peter Travers, in his three out of four star review, said "Vinterberg may rush the final act, but he brings out the wild side in Mulligan, who can hold a close-up like nobody's business. She's a live wire in a movie that knows how to stir up a classic for the here and now."
