= Girls & Boys (play) =

2018 one-woman play by Dennis Kelly

Girls and Boys is a 2018 one-woman play by British writer Dennis Kelly that narrates a story of love, marriage, and eventually, family violence. The script was published by Bloomsbury and Carey Mulligan's performance of it is available as an audio book.

== Plot ==
The 90-minute play is a monologue delivered by an unnamed woman who tells of meeting the man of her dreams, marrying him, and having children. Her first humorous recollection is of them meeting in an EasyJet queue preparing to board a plane to Italy. The story traces her love story with her husband, her children's lives, and her growing success as a documentary film producer. Her husband, however, experiences a slow failure in his furniture importation business, which eventually goes bankrupt. The husband becomes resentful at the woman's success, grows lazy at home, and ultimately the woman asks to separate. Her anecdotes are interspersed with mimed interactions with her two children, Leanne and Danny, where she comments on the differences between them as a boy and a girl.

Towards the end of the play, the woman says "I mean it's not like I think they're actually here", regarding the children she has been miming play with. The woman reveals that, in revenge for her separating from her husband and gaining custody of both their children, he violently murdered them both. She recounts how he attempted suicide by jumping off the balcony, but survived. He was then put in jail where he did kill himself.

== Reception ==
The first hour of the play has been described as "a cheerfully jaundiced portrait of modern romance." The play has also been called a "lovingly formed commentary on grief and social conscience." The script explores the dynamics between men and women through the story. Kelly has called the play "really disturbing", noting that he has had audience members walk out. Kelly explored including trigger warnings, but said, "the danger is that trigger warnings are the sharp end of us being scared of putting things on that may make people unhappy or uncomfortable." However, as the play heads toward its climax, the woman does say to the audience, "If it gets difficult – and it will get difficult – I want you to remember two things: remember that this did not happen to you, and that it is not happening now."

Kelly thanks Euripides in the play's acknowledgements. He began writing the play five years before he became a father, and long before the MeToo movement. He has said, "I would write a very different play today because we’re living in a very different world."

The script has been praised as "a wonderful mix of hilarity and horror" with "faultless" plotting. However, the play has also been criticised for its generalisations about toxic masculinity, with the monologue form leaving no room for insightful critique or a complex psychological portrayal of the husband. Vulture reviewer Isaac Butler said, "It has societal problems at its center — misogyny and violence — that it wants to talk with us about, but it has nothing new or particularly interesting to say."

Performances by the actresses in the role have been universally praised, with the challenges of shifting from light-hearted comedic sections to the dark ending. Canadian actress Fiona Mongillo noted, "Frankly, I was afraid of the show. It’s 16,000 words, in dialect, with a lot of non-sequiturs." New York Times reviewer Ben Brantley said, "Afterward, when you’re out of the coercive range of Ms. Mulligan’s gaze, you’ll find yourself thinking that Mr. Kelly is one lucky playwright to have had her as his interpreter."

== Performances ==
Girls & Boys had its world premiere at the Royal Court Theatre in February 2018, directed by Lyndsey Turner and starring Carey Mulligan. The production also had a run at the off-Broadway New York theatre, Minetta Lane Theatre in June 2018, produced by Audible. It received good reviews, with Mulligan's performance in particular praised.

In 2019, the play was staged in French at the Theatre du Petit Saint-Martin in Paris, starring Constance Dollé, directed by Melanie Leray and translated by Philippe Le Moine. Dollé was nominated for a Molière Award for her performance. In this production, four volunteers from the audience at each performance were invited to sit around a dinner table with the actress as she told the story.

In February 2021, theatre company Pangdemonium produced performances of the play with an all woman crew at the Drama Centre Theatre in Singapore, directed by Tracie Pang with Nikki Muller in the role.

In March 2022, State Theatre Company South Australia put on a performance of the play at the Odeon Theatre, Norwood in Adelaide as part of the Adelaide Festival. The performance was directed by the artistic director of STCSA, Mitchell Butel, and starred Justine Clarke. This production received overwhelmingly positive reviews, receiving five stars from reviewers and earning a standing ovation at least one performance. Clarke then performed the role at the Sydney Festival in January 2023, and at the Dunstan Playhouse in Adelaide and the Theatre Royal in Hobart in August 2023.

Nikki Shiels took on the role at the Melbourne Theatre Company in 2022, directed by Kate Champion. In this production, a live video feed onstage was used for parts of the performance, leading one reviewer to say this resulted in "a maudlin climax rather than a moving one."

In the Netherlands, the play was staged by Theater Oostpool, directed by Daria Bukvić and starring Hadewych Minis, who won the Theo d'Or prize for her solo performance. In Canada, Fiona Mongillo performed at the Crow's Theatre, Toronto directed by Lucy Jane Atkinson in early 2023.

The Auckland Theatre Company staged a production in September 2024 starring Beatriz Romilly.

In January 2025 the Gamm Theater in Rhode Island staged a production, directed by Rachel Walshe, starring Donnla Hughes which the Boston Globe described as spellbinding.

== Awards and nominations ==
- Constance Dollé was nominated for a Molière Award in 2019 for her performance
- The audio book received nominations at the 2019 Audie Awards for Audio Drama and Best Female Narrator
- Hadewych Minis won the 2022 Theo d'Or prize for her performance
