= Skylight (play) =

1995 play written by David Hare

- Faber and Faber first edition
- Original language: English
- Written by: David Hare
- Subject: Matters of life, love and circumstance between an older man and a younger woman
- Genre: Drama
- Setting: Present day flat in northwest London

Premiere
- Date: 1995
- Place: Cottesloe Theatre; London

Skylight is a play by British dramatist David Hare. The play premiered in the West End at the Royal National Theatre in 1995, moving to the Wyndham's Theatre in 1996. After opening on Broadway in 1996, it played again in the West End in 1997 at the Vaudeville Theatre. It was revived at Wyndham's Theatre in the West End in 2014, and that production transferred to Broadway in 2015.

== Summary ==
East London school teacher Kyra Hollis is visited by Edward Sergeant and, later on the same night, his father Tom Sergeant. Kyra had been living with the Sergeant family years earlier but left after her affair with Tom was discovered by Tom's wife, who has since died. Edward now accuses Kyra of having left him as well, as he saw her as a big sister, and he demands to know why she left his life.

Shortly thereafter, Tom, a wealthy restaurateur, with real-life references to Terence Conran, appears unheralded and for no apparent reason. Kyra's less-than-glamorous lifestyle leads him to poke fun at her to the point of insult, accusing her of self-punishment. After Kyra cooks a spaghetti dinner (which the actress cooks on stage), the talk turns to their relationship. It becomes clear that their chances to be rekindled rest on whether one of them can change preconceived notions of the other.

== Cast and Characters ==
Source: Skylight

- Tom Sergeant: near 50, wealthy restaurateur
- Kyra Hollis: just past 30, maths teacher in a poor area of London
- Edward Sergeant: Tom's son, 18, in his "gap year" before university

| Character | National Theatre (1995) | Broadway (1996) | West End Revival (1997) | West End Revival (2014) |
|---|---|---|---|---|
| Tom Sergeant | Michael Gambon | Michael Gambon | Bill Nighy | Bill Nighy |
| Kyra Hollis | Lia Williams | Lia Williams | Stella Gonet | Carey Mulligan |
| Edward Sergeant | Daniel Betts | Christian Camargo | Theo Fraser Steele | Matthew Beard |

== Production history ==
Skylight premiered in May 1995 at the then-Cottesloe Theatre, National Theatre, directed by Richard Eyre and starring Michael Gambon and Lia Williams. The production moved to the Wyndham's Theatre for a short run from 13 February 1996, again with Gambon and Williams. The play won the 1996 Laurence Olivier Award for Play of the Year. On 30 June 1997 the play opened at London's Vaudeville Theatre, with Bill Nighy in his first starring role, and Stella Gonet, directed by Eyre. It ran through 11 October 1997.

Both actors appeared in the Broadway transfer from September to December 1996. Both earned Tony Award nominations for their performances, as well as Eyre as director and the play as Best Play. The play won the New York Drama Critics' Circle award as Best Foreign Play. A new production directed by Stephen Daldry and starring Carey Mulligan, Nighy—reprising the part he had first performed in 1997—and Matthew Beard opened at the Wyndham's Theatre in June 2014. The play was broadcast live (or near-live) to cinema audiences via National Theatre Live (NT Live) on 17 July 2014. This production transferred to Broadway at the John Golden Theatre on 16 March 2015. The production officially opened on 2 April in a limited engagement to 21 June. The play was nominated for seven 2015 Tony Awards, and won Best Revival of a Play.

On June 10, 2016, Hidden Cove Productions was to open Skylight, starring Sara Topham, Lindsay G. Merrithew and Tim Dowler-Coltman, at the Berkeley Street Theatre in Toronto, Canada. Larry Moss was to direct the four-week run. The world premiere of Skylight in the Chinese language took stage in the Lyric Theatre in Hong Kong on July 1, 2016. Starring Dayo Wong, Fala Chen and Terrance Lau. Directed by Chan Chu-Hei. Initially scheduled for 24 shows, the show was sold out within a few hours of opening for sale, and due to overwhelming response, 11 additional shows were added. On February 14, 2017, Theatre Calgary was to open Skylight, starring Geoffrey Simon Brown, Dean Paul Gibson and Myla Southward at the Max Bell Theatre in Calgary, Alberta, Valerie Planche directing the two-week run. On March 26, 2020 Verendus Theatrical was to open Skylight, starring Alicia Zorkovic, Brant Eustice and Jackson Barnard at the Holden Street Theatres in Adelaide, South Australia, Tim Williams directing the two-week run. Due to the COVID-19 Pandemic the show was forced to reschedule until January 14, 2021.

== Awards and nominations ==
=== Original London Production ===
| Year | Award | Category | Nominee | Result | Ref. |
|---|---|---|---|---|---|
| 1996 | Laurence Olivier Award | Best New Play | David Hare | Won | |
| 1996 | Laurence Olivier Award | Best Actor | Michael Gambon | Nominated | |
| 1996 | Laurence Olivier Award | Best Actress | Lia Williams | Nominated | |
| 1996 | Laurence Olivier Award | Best Director | Richard Eyre | Nominated | |
| 1996 | Laurence Olivier Award | Best Set Design | John Gunter | Nominated | |

=== Original Broadway Production ===
| Year | Award | Category | Nominee | Result | Ref. |
|---|---|---|---|---|---|
| 1997 | Tony Awards | Best Play | David Hare | Nominated | |
| 1997 | Tony Awards | Best Actor in a Play | Michael Gambon | Nominated | |
| 1997 | Tony Awards | Best Actress in a Play | Lia Williams | Nominated | |
| 1997 | Tony Awards | Best Direction of a Play | Richard Eyre | Nominated | |
| 1997 | Drama Desk Award | Outstanding Actor in a Play | Michael Gambon | Nominated | |
| 1997 | Drama Desk Award | Outstanding Actress in a Play | Lia Williams | Nominated | |
| 1997 | Drama League Award | Distinguished Production of a Play | | Nominated | |
| 1997 | New York Drama Critics' Circle | Best Foreign Play | David Hare | Won | |
| 1997 | Theatre World Award | Outstanding Debut Ensemble | Michael Gambon, Lia Williams and Christian Camargo | Won | |

=== 2015 West End revival ===
| Year | Award | Category | Nominee | Result | Ref. |
|---|---|---|---|---|---|
| 2015 | Laurence Olivier Awards | Best Revival | | Won | |

=== 2015 Broadway revival ===
| Year | Award | Category | Nominee | Result | Ref. |
|---|---|---|---|---|---|
| 2015 | Tony Awards | Best Revival of a Play | | Won | |
| 2015 | Tony Awards | Best Actor in a Play | Bill Nighy | Nominated | |
| 2015 | Tony Awards | Best Actress in a Play | Carey Mulligan | Nominated | |
| 2015 | Tony Awards | Best Featured Actor in a Play | Matthew Beard | Nominated | |
| 2015 | Tony Awards | Best Direction of a Play | Stephen Daldry | Nominated | |
| 2015 | Tony Awards | Best Scenic Design of a Play | Bob Crowley | Nominated | |
| 2015 | Tony Awards | Best Lighting Design of a Play | Natasha Katz | Nominated | |
| 2015 | Drama Desk Awards | Outstanding Actress in a Play | Carey Mulligan | Nominated | |
| 2015 | Drama League Award | Distinguished Revival of a Play | | Nominated | |
| 2015 | Drama League Award | Distinguished Performance | Bill Nighy | Nominated | |
| 2015 | Drama League Award | Distinguished Performance | Carey Mulligan | Nominated | |
| 2015 | Outer Critics Circle Award | Outstanding Revival of a Play | | Nominated | |
