= An Education =

2009 film directed by Lone Scherfig

- Theatrical release poster
- Directed by: Lone Scherfig
- Screenplay by: Nick Hornby
- Based on: An Education by Lynn Barber
- Produced by: Finola Dwyer; Amanda Posey
- Starring: Carey Mulligan; Peter Sarsgaard; Alfred Molina; Rosamund Pike; Dominic Cooper; Olivia Williams; Emma Thompson
- Cinematography: John de Borman
- Edited by: Barney Pilling
- Music by: Paul Englishby
- Production companies: Endgame Entertainment; BBC Films; Wildgaze Films; Finola Dwyer Productions; Mittal Productions
- Distributed by: E1 Entertainment (United Kingdom; through Contender Films); Sony Pictures Classics (United States)
- Release dates: 18 January 2009 (Sundance); 30 October 2009 (United Kingdom); 16 October 2009 (United States)
- Running time: 100 minutes
- Countries: United Kingdom; United States
- Language: English
- Budget: $7.5 million
- Box office: $26.1 million

An Education is a 2009 coming-of-age drama film based on an article by journalist Lynn Barber. The film was directed by Lone Scherfig from a screenplay by Nick Hornby, and stars Carey Mulligan as Jenny, a bright schoolgirl, and Peter Sarsgaard as David, the charming man who seduces her.

An Education premiered at the 2009 Sundance Film Festival, was theatrically released in the US on 16 October 2009 and in the UK on 30 October. The film received positive reviews from critics and was nominated for three Academy Awards: Best Picture, Best Adapted Screenplay, and Best Actress for Mulligan. It was also nominated for eight British Academy Film Awards (including Best Film and Best Supporting Actor for Alfred Molina), with Mulligan winning Best Leading Actress.

== Plot ==
In 1961 London, Jenny Mellor is a bright and attractive 16-year-old schoolgirl who aspires to attend the University of Oxford. Her studies are controlled by her strict father, Jack. After youth orchestra rehearsals, Jenny waits at a bus stop on the street in heavy rain when David Goldman, an older man, stops his Bristol 405 and tells her that he is a music lover and is worried about her cello getting wet. He persuades Jenny to put her cello in his car while she walks alongside. As the rain becomes heavier, Jenny asks David if she can sit inside the car. The two talk about music and, before being dropped off, Jenny confides that she is looking forward to attending university and being able to live a life of culture, doing things such as going to art galleries and watching French films. The following week, David has flowers delivered to Jenny's house, wishing her luck at her youth orchestra's concert. Later, she sees him in town and approaches him. David asks Jenny if she is free to go and see a concert and have supper with him and his friends. She happily agrees and thanks him.

On the night of the concert, Jack disapproves of Jenny going, but when David comes by to pick up Jenny, he easily charms Jack into letting him take Jenny and bring her home later than her normal curfew. Arriving at the concert, Jenny meets David's friends, Danny and Helen. Afterwards, they go to dinner at a fancy restaurant with live music much to Jenny's liking. Finding she is also interested in art, they invite Jenny to an art auction. David picks up Jenny at school and they go to the auction, winning a bid for a painting by Edward Burne-Jones and going to Danny's place afterwards. They talk about Oxford and all agree to go and visit together the following weekend.

Jenny hears a commotion late one night and sees David drinking with her parents. He then uses the opportunity to ask them if he can take Jenny to Oxford, saying that he used to study there and would like to visit his old teacher, Clive Lewis, the author of The Chronicles of Narnia. Her parents are reluctant at first, but agree, seeing it as a good opportunity. At Oxford, Jenny discovers that David makes his money through a variety of shady practices, and although initially shocked succumbs to David's persuasive talk. Back outside her home, Jenny and David have their first kiss. Jenny then shows a signed copy of The Lion, the Witch and the Wardrobe to her parents (in fact, she had seen David sign it, and they had never met Lewis). Impressed by David's apparent connections and charisma, Jack and Marjorie approve of their romantic relationship.

On the night of Jenny's 17th birthday, David arrives with presents and tells her parents that he intends to take them all to Paris as a special birthday gift. Her father demurs, but following a conversation with David agrees to Jenny going with him alone. In Paris, the two go sight-seeing, take photos, and go dancing, and Jenny loses her virginity to David. Back in London, Jenny gives her favourite teacher, Miss Stubbs, Chanel perfume as a gift from her trip, but Miss Stubbs refuses the gift, telling Jenny that she knows where it came from and is both concerned and disapproving of her relationship with David. They argue and have a falling-out. Later that night, David proposes marriage. After talking with her parents, Jenny accepts the proposal, but the news causes an argument with her headmistress, and she decides to drop out of school and not pursue a place at university.

While getting petrol on their way to a celebration dinner with her parents, Jenny looks in the car's glove compartment for a cigarette and discovers, through letters, that David is already married. Shocked, Jenny tells David to take her and her parents back home. Jenny tearfully argues with David, telling him she gave up her education to be with him. David says he will get a divorce and agrees that he will tell her parents the truth with her, but after she goes inside her house, he drives off and is never seen again.

Jenny despairs, and goes to see Danny and Helen, blaming them for not telling her the truth early on. She also blames her parents for encouraging her to throw her life away with an older man. Jenny goes to see David's wife, who tells her that David is a serial adulterer, and has a son. Later that night, Jack apologizes to Jenny, admitting that he messed up and that he believed David could give her the life she wanted. Jack points out that although David wasn't who he said he was, Jenny had also deceived her parents about David's nature by playing along with some of David's lies to her parents. When Jenny is then refused re-admission to her old school to repeat her last year and take her exams, she goes to Miss Stubbs, apologising and asking for her help. Miss Stubbs eagerly agrees, and Jenny resumes her studies and is accepted at Oxford the following year. In a closing voiceover, Jenny shares a story about dating boys her age and starting over with fresh eyes, despite her experience with David.

== Cast ==
- Carey Mulligan as Jenny Mellor
- Peter Sarsgaard as David Goldman
- Dominic Cooper as Danny, David's friend
- Rosamund Pike as Helen, Danny's girlfriend
- Alfred Molina as Jack Mellor, Jenny's father
- Cara Seymour as Marjorie Mellor, Jenny's mother
- Emma Thompson as Miss Walters, the headmistress at Jenny's school
- Olivia Williams as Miss Stubbs, Jenny's teacher
- Sally Hawkins as Sarah Goldman
- Matthew Beard as Graham, a boy Jenny knows from the Youth Orchestra
- Ellie Kendrick as Tina, Jenny's friend from school
- Ashley Rice as Petrol Attendant

Orlando Bloom was originally cast in the role of David's friend Danny, but dropped out before shooting began.

== Production ==
Principal photography began on March 17, 2008.

=== Development ===
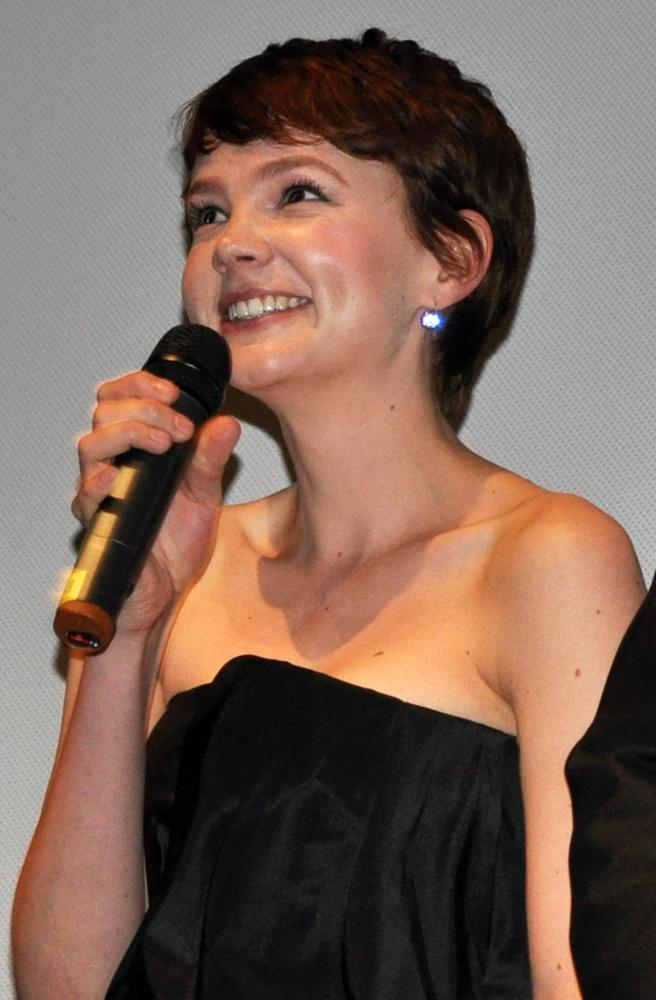
Mulligan during a Q&A following the screening of An Education at Ryerson Theatre on 25 September 2009.

Nick Hornby created the screenplay based on an autobiographical essay by the British journalist Lynn Barber about her schoolgirl affair with conman Simon Prewalski, referred to by her as Simon Goldman, which was published in the literary magazine Granta (82: Life's Like That, Summer 2003). Hornby was the boyfriend of Amanda Posey, the film's producer, whom he later married.

Both the memoir and the film also allude briefly to Peter Rachman, the notorious post-World War II London property speculator, who Goldman is working for. Barber's full memoir, An Education, was not published in book form until June 2009, when filming had already been completed. Hornby said that what appealed to him in the memoir was that "She's a suburban girl who's frightened that she's going to get cut out of everything good that happens in the city. That, to me, is a big story in popular culture. It's the story of pretty much every rock 'n' roll band." Although the screenplay involved Hornby writing about a teenage girl, he did not feel it was more challenging than writing any other character: "I think the moment you're writing about somebody who's not exactly you, then the challenge is all equal. I was glad that everyone around me on this movie was a woman so that they could watch me carefully. But I don't remember anyone saying to me, 'That isn't how women think.'"

=== Visual style ===
Although Jenny's family home is supposed to be in the suburb of Twickenham, Middlesex (incorrectly referred to as 'Twickenham, London' – Twickenham did not become part of Greater London until 1965), the residential scenes featured in the film were shot on Carbery Avenue in the Gunnersbury area of Ealing, west London as well as Mattock Lane in West Ealing and The Japanese School in Acton, which used to be the site of the girls' school called Haberdashers' Aske's School for Girls. The concert hall shown in the film, St John's, Smith Square, would still have been a wartime ruin at the time the film was set. It was subsequently restored and opened as a concert hall in October 1969.

== Release ==
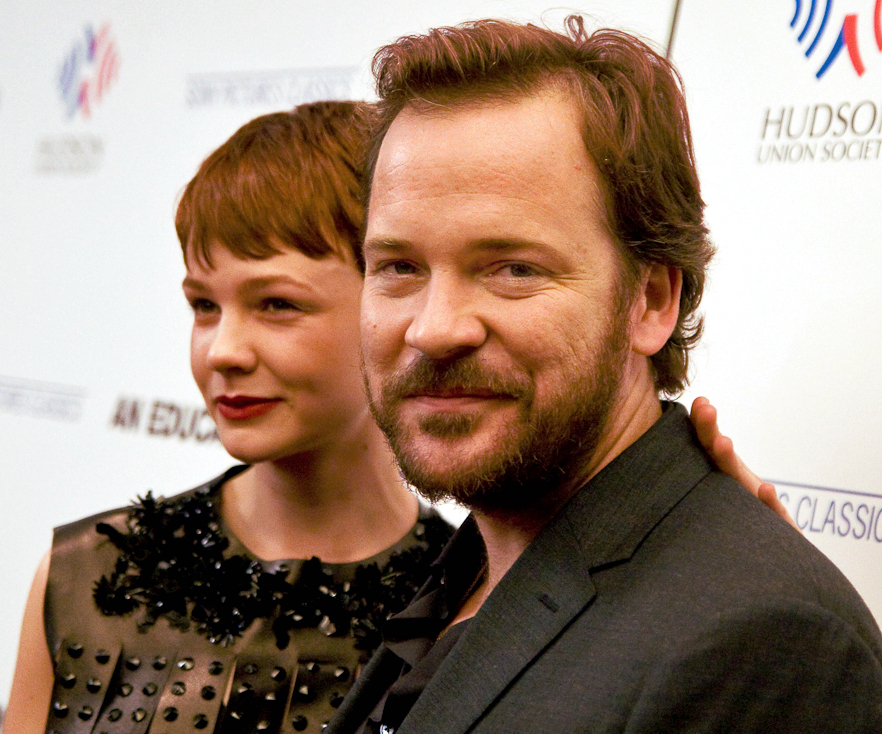
Carey Mulligan and Peter Sarsgaard at the New York premiere in October 2009

=== Critical response ===
On Rotten Tomatoes, the film has an approval rating of 93% based on 198 reviews, with an average rating of 7.9/10. The site's critics consensus reads: "Though the latter part of the film may not appeal to all, An Education is a charming coming-of-age tale powered by the strength of relative newcomer Carey Mulligan's standout performance." Metacritic assigned the film a weighted average score of 85 out of 100 based on 34 critics, indicating "universal acclaim".

=== Box office ===
An Education grossed $12.6 million in the United States and Canada, and $13.5 million in other territories (including £1.6 million in the UK) for a worldwide total of $26.1 million.

Despite never grossing over $1 million in a weekend, the film played for 30 weeks in the U.S. and legged out to over $12 million.

=== Accolades ===
An Education won the Audience Choice award and the Cinematography award at the 2009 Sundance Film Festival. Mulligan won a Hollywood Film Festival award for Best Hollywood Breakthrough Performance for a Female. It was selected as Sight & Sound's film of the month.

The film received three nominations at the 82nd Academy Awards: Best Picture, Best Actress for Carey Mulligan and Best Adapted Screenplay, but did not win in any category. The 63rd British Academy Film Awards saw the film come away with one award (for Best Actress) from nine nominations. The film received six British Independent Film Awards nominations and five Satellite Awards nominations.

=== Home media ===
An Education was released on DVD and Blu-ray on 30 March 2010.

=== Theatrical play ===
The first adaptation of the screenplay to live theatre was staged at the University of St Andrews in 2019 at the annual On the Rocks Festival.
