= Emily Steel =

American journalist

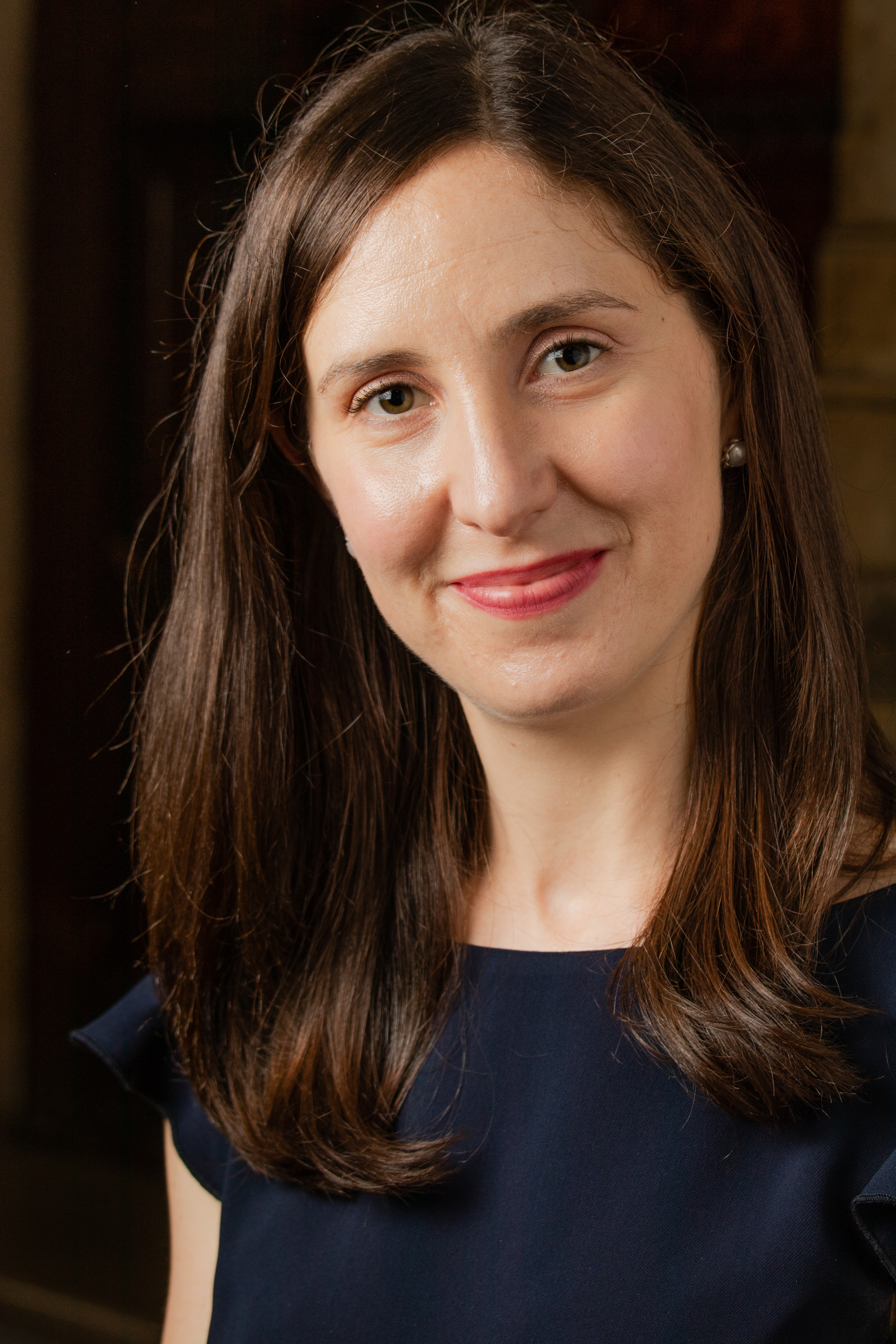
- Steel at the 2018 Pulitzer Prizes
- Alma mater: University of North Carolina

Emily Steel is an American business journalist who has contributed to several news publications and has covered the media industry at The New York Times since 2014. Steel published an investigative report on Fox News Host Bill O'Reilly that may have contributed to his firing. The report may have also contributed to the #MeToo movement that began later that year. Mediaite identified Steel as one of the 75 most influential people in American news media in 2017.

== Investigative reports ==
=== Bill O'Reilly ===
Steel published an investigative piece in 2017 with Michael S. Schmidt about sexual misconduct and settlements by former Fox News host Bill O'Reilly called "Bill O'Reilly Settled New Harassment Claim, Then Fox Renewed His Contract". In 2018, her writing received the 2018 Pulitzer Prize for Public Service along with Michael S. Schmidt, Jodi Kantor, and Megan Twohey, and the Gerald Loeb Award for Investigative business journalism. This piece received widespread media attention and may have helped lead to O'Reilly's firing from Fox News.

This work is portrayed in the 2022 film She Said, in which she is played by Sarah Ann Masse.

== Biography ==
Steel was born in Salt Lake City but moved to Lincoln, Nebraska and East Lyme, Connecticut before she graduated from the University of North Carolina. She lives in New York City. Steel says she became interested in journalism after writing a piece in her high school newspaper about how to be happy and grateful in the wake of 9/11; she said a janitor approached her to say her piece had brightened her day, and she knew in that moment she wanted to become a writer.

Steel worked at The Wall Street Journal for 8 years, where she shared the 2011 Gerald Loeb Award for Online Enterprise business journalism for "What They Know." She worked for two years at the Financial Times before joining The New York Times in 2014 after Brian Stelter left for CNN.
