= 2022 St. Louis Film Critics Association Awards =

Annual US film awards ceremony

19th StLFCA Awards

December 18, 2022

Best Film:
Everything Everywhere All at Once

The nominees for the 19th St. Louis Film Critics Association Awards were announced on December 11, 2022.

The Banshees of Inisherin led the nominations with eleven, followed by Everything Everywhere All at Once with ten, including Best Film and Best Director each.

The winners were announced on December 18, 2022.

== Winners and nominees ==
=== Best Film ===
- Everything Everywhere All at Once
  - Runner-up: Women Talking
    - The Banshees of Inisherin
    - Elvis
    - She Said

=== Best Actor ===
- Brendan Fraser – The Whale
  - Runner-up: Austin Butler – Elvis
    - Daniel Craig – Glass Onion: A Knives Out Mystery
    - Colin Farrell – The Banshees of Inisherin
    - Paul Mescal – Aftersun

=== Best Supporting Actor ===
- Ke Huy Quan – Everything Everywhere All at Once
  - Runner-up: Brendan Gleeson – The Banshees of Inisherin
    - Andre Braugher – She Said
    - Judd Hirsch – The Fabelmans
    - Ben Whishaw – Women Talking

=== Best Original Screenplay ===
- The Banshees of Inisherin – Martin McDonagh (TIE)
- Everything Everywhere All at Once – Daniel Kwan and Daniel Scheinert (TIE)
  - Runner-up: The Menu – Seth Reiss and Will Tracy
    - Decision to Leave – Park Chan-wook and Gong Seo-kyeong
    - The Fabelmans – Steven Spielberg and Tony Kushner
    - Tár – Todd Field

=== Best Animated Feature ===
- Marcel the Shell with Shoes On
  - Runner-up: Guillermo del Toro's Pinocchio
    - Apollo 10 1/2: A Space Age Childhood
    - Turning Red
    - Wendell & Wild

=== Best International Feature ===
- Decision to Leave • South Korea
  - Runner-up: RRR • India
    - All Quiet on the Western Front • Germany
    - Close • Belgium
    - Happening • France

=== Best Cinematography ===
- The Banshees of Inisherin – Ben Davis
  - Runner-up: The Batman – Greig Fraser
    - Nope – Hoyte van Hoytema
    - Top Gun: Maverick – Claudio Miranda
    - Women Talking – Luc Montpellier

=== Best Costume Design ===
- Elvis – Catherine Martin
  - Runner-up: Black Panther: Wakanda Forever – Ruth E. Carter
    - The Fabelmans – Mark Bridges
    - Mrs. Harris Goes to Paris – Jenny Beavan
    - The Woman King – Gersha Phillips

=== Best Score ===
- Women Talking – Hildur Guðnadóttir
  - Runner-up: The Banshees of Inisherin – Carter Burwell
  - Runner-up: The Batman – Michael Giacchino
  - Runner-up: The Fabelmans – John Williams
    - Babylon – Justin Hurwitz

=== Best Visual Effects ===
- Avatar: The Way of Water – Joe Letteri, Richard Baneham, Eric Saindon, and Daniel Barrett
  - Runner-up: Everything Everywhere All at Once – Zak Stoltz, Ethan Feldbau, Benjamin Brewer, and Jeff Desom
    - Nope – Guillaume Rocheron, Jeremy Robert, Sreejith Venugopalan, and Scott R. Fisher
    - RRR – V. Srinivas Mohan
    - Top Gun: Maverick – Ryan Tudhope, Scott R. Fisher, Seth Hill, and Bryan Litson

=== Best Comedy Film ===
- Weird: The Al Yankovic Story
  - Runner-up: Glass Onion: A Knives Out Mystery
    - Everything Everywhere All at Once
    - Jackass Forever
    - The Unbearable Weight of Massive Talent

=== Best Scene ===
- The Fabelmans – Sam meets one of his idols on the studio lot
  - Runner-up: Top Gun: Maverick – Iceman visits with Maverick
    - Marcel the Shell with Shoes On – Marcel on 60 Minutes
    - Nope – A tragic day on the set of Gordy's Home
    - RRR – Piggyback prison escape
    - Tár – Lydia bullies a Juilliard student

=== Best Director ===
- Sarah Polley – Women Talking
  - Runner-up: Daniel Kwan and Daniel Scheinert – Everything Everywhere All at Once
    - Baz Luhrmann – Elvis
    - Martin McDonagh – The Banshees of Inisherin
    - Steven Spielberg – The Fabelmans

=== Best Actress ===
- Michelle Yeoh – Everything Everywhere All at Once
  - Runner-up: Danielle Deadwyler – Till
    - Cate Blanchett – Tár
    - Mia Goth – Pearl
    - Emma Thompson – Good Luck to You, Leo Grande
    - Michelle Williams – The Fabelmans

=== Best Supporting Actress ===
- Kerry Condon – The Banshees of Inisherin
  - Runner-up: Angela Bassett – Black Panther: Wakanda Forever
  - Runner-up: Janelle Monáe – Glass Onion: A Knives Out Mystery
    - Claire Foy – Women Talking
    - Carey Mulligan – She Said

=== Best Adapted Screenplay ===
- She Said – Rebecca Lenkiewicz; based on the book by Jodi Kantor and Megan Twohey, and on the New York Times investigation by Kantor, Twohey, and Rebecca Corbett
  - Runner-up: Women Talking – Sarah Polley and Miriam Toews; based on the novel by Toews
    - Glass Onion: A Knives Out Mystery – Rian Johnson; based on characters created by him
    - Guillermo del Toro's Pinocchio – Guillermo del Toro and Patrick McHale; del Toro and Matthew Robbins (story); based on the novel by Carlo Collodi
    - White Noise – Noah Baumbach; based on the novel by Don DeLillo

=== Best Documentary Feature ===
- All the Beauty and the Bloodshed
  - Runner-up: Good Night Oppy
  - Runner-up: Moonage Daydream
    - Fire of Love
    - "Sr."

=== Best Ensemble ===
- Women Talking
  - Runner-up: Glass Onion: A Knives Out Mystery
    - The Banshees of Inisherin
    - Everything Everywhere All at Once
    - The Fabelmans

=== Best Editing ===
- Everything Everywhere All at Once – Paul Rogers
  - Runner-up: Elvis – Jonathan Redmond and Matt Villa
    - The Banshees of Inisherin – Mikkel E. G. Nielsen
    - Tár – Monika Willi
    - Top Gun: Maverick – Eddie Hamilton

=== Best Production Design ===
- Elvis – Catherine Martin and Karen Murphy
  - Runner-up: Glass Onion: A Knives Out Mystery – Rick Heinrichs
    - Avatar: The Way of Water – Dylan Cole and Ben Procter
    - The Banshees of Inisherin – Mark Tildesley
    - Black Panther: Wakanda Forever – Hannah Beachler

=== Best Soundtrack ===
- Elvis
  - Runner-up: Moonage Daydream
    - Black Panther: Wakanda Forever
    - Top Gun: Maverick
    - Weird: The Al Yankovic Story

=== Best Action Film ===
- Top Gun: Maverick
  - Runner-up: RRR
    - Avatar: The Way of Water
    - Everything Everywhere All at Once
    - The Woman King

=== Best Horror Film ===
- Nope
  - Runner-up: X
    - Men
    - Pearl
    - Scream

=== Special Merits ===
- David Bowie – For the expansive and continuing cinematic presence of the singer-songwriter and actor, whose life and music continues to permeate and enrich the cinema landscape)
- Ashley Judd – For the bravery she demonstrated in portraying herself in She Said)
- Jafar Panahi – For the courage of the imprisoned Iranian director and all film professionals confronting political oppression in the pursuit of free speech, human rights, and artistic expression)
