= She Said (score) =

She Said (Original Motion Picture Score)

Film score by Nicholas Britell
- Released: November 18, 2022
- Recorded: 2022
- Genre: Film score
- Length: 40:17
- Label: Back Lot Music
- Producer: Nicholas Britell; Caitlin Sullivan

Nicholas Britell chronology
Andor (2022)	She Said (2022)

She Said (Original Motion Picture Score) is the score album to the 2022 film of the same name, based on the 2019 book by reporters Jodi Kantor and Megan Twohey, that stars Carey Mulligan and Zoe Kazan as Twohey and Kantor, respectively, following their New York Times investigation that exposed Harvey Weinstein's history of abuse and sexual misconduct against women. The film features original score composed by Nicholas Britell and cello performances by his wife Caitlin Sullivan. The album was released by Back Lot Music on November 18, 2022.

== Development ==
"There are many parts of the film where I would tailor things to match the investigation, and to follow those really functional needs. But I think what really drew me to this was to explore the inner emotional world. And the wonderful outgrowth of that was getting to collaborate with Caitlin as the co-producer on the score — which is something we’ve never had the opportunity to do before."

— Nicholas Britell

The score, composed by Nicholas Britell, had cello being the primary instrument for the film played by Britell's wife and classical cellist Caitlin Sullivan. He felt that "there was something about the sonic possibilities of what a cello can do that, intuitively, felt right". In addition to the cello, Britell also played piano and accompanied with a 15-piece string orchestra in New York City, where Sullivan performs both chamber and orchestral ensembles.

Based on the revelations of substantial allegations of sexual misconduct by Hollywood producer Harvey Weinstein, by The New York Times reporters Jodi Kantor and Megan Twohey, Nicholas Britell wanted to reflect the aftermath of this event through the score, saying "There is a search for truth here, but there’s also a search for inner truth. There’s a whole layer of the music talking not just about work and home life, but about inner trauma. It was so important to be incredibly sensitive, incredibly restrained." The musical landscape consisted of "dark, ominous, disturbing sounds" and "icier, more textured, more edgy ones" that are created using advanced compositional and performance techniques.

Sulivan wanted to make sure that she explores more extended techniques on the cello, "to get to the absolute fullest spectrum of sounds and to access different emotions and highlight the trauma that was being portrayed". In one particular technique, she plucked the strings in a way, that was "very jolting" and could "hear the metal against the wood of the fingerboard" which has an "appropriate ugliness to it". In another technique, she snapped the strings on the fingerboard that "creates a percussive, reverberant, repetitive sound that was gritty but also tenacious". She further came up with a swinging arpeggio effect that Britell turned the motif into "memory of trauma" that "symbolizes this idea of the complexity, and the pain, and the feeling of needing to deal with it in some way".

The score also accompanies New York Philharmonic orchestra's string harmonies, along with more electronic, studio-produced and percussive textures by Britell, in addition to piano-based swirls, snaps and crescendos, resulting in a sonic landscape. Britll added that "The dissonances represent the challenge of what [the reporters] are doing, for so many different reasons". Britell said regarding the score:

"There was this docudrama feel of it. At the same time, I felt that it was really important that the full range of emotion was felt through this. It’s not a documentary. And on the surface there is this investigation, there is this search for truth, and for the real story — but I think one of the really special things that Maria did, that the whole film does, is it gets into this question of public and private, of the sort of inner feelings and outer feelings of the world. That was really the center of the emotional world that I was looking for in the music, and was this question of how to balance people’s public lives and their private lives, and the inner journey of both Megan and Jodi — but also in a sense, I think, all women."

== Track listing ==
No.	Title	Length
1.	"Overture"	2:02
2.	"She Said – Main Title"	0:57
3.	"Work and Home"	1:12
4.	"Spies Watching You"	1:00
5.	"Those Records Would Have Been Destroyed"	1:41
6.	"Driving to Queens"	1:16
7.	"In the Park"	1:39
8.	"Reporter Twins"	1:43
9.	"Staring at a Brick Wall"	1:01
10.	"Bayside"	1:15
11.	"Laura"	3:00
12.	"So Many More Recent Offenses"	1:35
13.	"Sorry You Signed Up?"	3:00
14.	"Rowena"	3:10
15.	"Do What You Want With These"	2:39
16.	"Go Home It's Late"	2:02
17.	"Yes"	2:14
18.	"Let Him In"	1:23
19.	"This Is Bad"	2:21
20.	"Conclusion"	5:07
Total length:		40:17

== Reception ==
The score received generally positive response from critics. "Nicholas Britell’s score drones over late-night laptop scrolling or cell phone calls." Ella Kemp of Empire felt that Britell "evokes his sombre work on Succession rather than the delicate emotion infused into his scores for Barry Jenkins."

Jeremy Taylor of Film Festival Today said Britell's score "does tremendous heavy lifting". Adrian Horton of The Guardian Britell's work as "full-bodied, foreboding".

Alyssa Ortiz of Daily Titan wrote "The musical score, composed by Nicholas Britell, helped build intensity and suspense in scenes. Whether it was waiting on a call or listening to the women recount their experiences, the musical intensity engrossed the audience in the world of the film."

Britell's score for She Said was intended to be the possible contender for Academy Award for Best Original Score at the 95th Academy Awards.
