= She Said (film) =

2022 U.S. film by Maria Schrader

- Theatrical release poster
- Directed by: Maria Schrader
- Screenplay by: Rebecca Lenkiewicz
- Based on: She Said by Jodi Kantor; Megan Twohey
- Produced by: Dede Gardner; Jeremy Kleiner
- Starring: Carey Mulligan; Zoe Kazan; Patricia Clarkson; Andre Braugher; Jennifer Ehle; Samantha Morton; Ashley Judd
- Cinematography: Natasha Braier
- Edited by: Hansjörg Weißbrich
- Music by: Nicholas Britell
- Production companies: Annapurna Pictures; Plan B Entertainment
- Distributed by: Universal Pictures
- Release dates: October 13, 2022 (NYFF); November 18, 2022 (United States)
- Running time: 129 minutes
- Country: United States
- Language: English
- Budget: $32 million
- Box office: $13.9 million

She Said is a 2022 American drama film directed by Maria Schrader and written by Rebecca Lenkiewicz, based on the 2019 book by the reporters Jodi Kantor and Megan Twohey. The film stars Carey Mulligan and Zoe Kazan as Twohey and Kantor, respectively, and follows their New York Times investigation that exposed Harvey Weinstein's history of abuse and sexual misconduct against women. The film also stars Patricia Clarkson, Jennifer Ehle, Samantha Morton, and Andre Braugher, in his final film role before his death in 2023. Ashley Judd appears as herself.

The book was optioned in 2018, and the film was announced in 2021 as a co-production between Annapurna Pictures and Plan B Entertainment. Filming took place in New York with cinematographer Natasha Braier. During post-production, editing was completed by Hansjörg Weißbrich and the score was composed by Nicholas Britell.

She Said had its world premiere at the 60th New York Film Festival on October 13, 2022, and was released in the United States on November 18, 2022, by Universal Pictures. The film received generally positive reviews from critics, who praised the screenplay and the performances of Kazan and Mulligan. It was also named one of the best films of 2022 by the American Film Institute. However, it was a box-office bomb, grossing $13.9 million against a production budget of $32 million. The film was nominated for Best Actress in a Supporting Role for Mulligan and Best Adapted Screenplay for Lenkiewicz at the 76th British Academy Film Awards. It also earned Mulligan a Golden Globe Award nomination and Lenkiewicz a Critics' Choice Award nomination.

== Plot ==
In 2017, New York Times reporter Jodi Kantor receives a tip that actress Rose McGowan was sexually assaulted by Indiewood producer Harvey Weinstein. McGowan initially declines to comment, but later calls her back and describes an encounter in which Weinstein raped her when she was 23.

Kantor also speaks with actresses Ashley Judd and Gwyneth Paltrow, who describe their own experiences with Weinstein, but both ask not to be named in the article for fear of career blowback. Frustrated by a lack of progress in her ensuing investigation, she recruits Megan Twohey to help with the piece.

Twohey tracks down a woman who worked as an assistant to Weinstein at Miramax decades ago and disappeared; the woman fearfully declines to speak on the matter due to having signed an NDA. Kantor confronts the former CFO of Miramax about past settlement payouts by Weinstein against his accusers, but he is hesitant to divulge any information about it.

Twohey is similarly rejected by the EEOC after requesting more information about the settlements. She speaks to Linda Fairstein, a former member of the district attorney's office about why criminal complaints against Weinstein were dropped so quickly; she learns that Weinstein had social connections with Fairstein and the DA's office.

Kantor receives a tip about three former Weinstein assistants who may have been abused: Rowena Chiu, Zelda Perkins, and Laura Madden. She flies out to confront each of them individually. Unable to meet with Chiu, Perkins recounts an incident to Kantor in which Chiu had a breakdown after an encounter with Weinstein. Madden initially declines to speak with her, but changes her mind after a Weinstein representative reaches out to discourage her from speaking to reporters about her experience.

Weinstein learns of the investigation and sends a lawyer to attempt to appease reporters, but declines to go on the record and denies all wrongdoing. The lawyer acknowledges a number of past financial settlements, but declines to say how many. Kantor receives an anonymous tip to speak with Irwin Reiter, one of Weinstein's former accountants; he shows her an internal memo that circulated at Miramax in 2015 detailing abuse allegations from a former employee.

The Times notifies the Weinstein Company board of the impending article and asks for a statement. Weinstein denies the allegations and pressures the reporters to name their sources, threatening to talk to other publications to discredit the story. He eventually releases a statement acknowledging that he has caused pain to others in the past and that he is taking a leave of absence from The Weinstein Company. Kantor and Twohey attempt to convince their sources to go on the record; all initially decline, but Judd and Madden later agree to be named in the article, believing it is the right thing to do.

The Times publishes the story on October 5, 2017. After the article's publication, 82 women come forward with their own allegations against Weinstein, leading to workplace and legal reforms. Weinstein is currently serving a 23-year sentence for rape and sexual assault in New York.

== Cast ==
- Carey Mulligan as Megan Twohey
- Zoe Kazan as Jodi Kantor
- Dalya Knapp as Talia, Jodi's older daughter
- Emery Ellis Harper as Violet, Jodi's younger daughter
- Patricia Clarkson as Rebecca Corbett, Investigations Editor at the NYT
- Andre Braugher as Dean Baquet
- Frank Wood as Matt Purdy, Investigations Editor at NYT
- Tom Pelphrey as Vadim "Jim" Rutman, husband of Megan Twohey
- Adam Shapiro as Ron Lieber, NYT writer and husband of Jodi Kantor
- Jennifer Ehle as Laura Madden, 1990s Miramax London assistant and abuse victim who never signed a non-disclosure agreement with Miramax
  - Lola Petticrew as young Laura
- Samantha Morton as Zelda Perkins, 1990s Miramax London assistant, abuse victim and witness
  - Molly Windsor as young Zelda
- Angela Yeoh as Rowena Chiu, 1990s Miramax assistant and Weinstein rape victim
  - Ashley Chiu as young Rowena
- Edward Astor Chin as Andrew Cheung, husband of Rowena Chiu
- Emma Clare O'Connor as Rachel Crooks, Trump sexual-misconduct accuser
- Sarah Ann Masse as NYT journalist Emily Steel who broke the Bill O'Reilly sexual harassment case. Masse is an actress who was sexually harassed by Weinstein in a 2008 nanny interview.
- Katherine Kendall as the Miramax executive who gave Kantor the tip to interview Laura, Zelda, and Rowena. Kendall was a young actress in 1993 who was sexually harassed by Weinstein.
- Lauren O'Connor as the voice of herself, reading her 2015 Weinstein Co. memo on Weinstein's abuses.
- James Austin Johnson as the voice of Donald Trump
- Ashley Judd as herself
- Keilly McQuail as the voice of Rose McGowan
- Anastasia Barzee as Lisa Bloom
- Mike Houston as Harvey Weinstein
- Gwyneth Paltrow as the voice of herself
- Leah Kreitz as Gwyneth Paltrow's assistant
- John Mazurek as John Schmidt, CFO of Miramax who knew about hush payments to victims
- Peter Friedman as Lanny Davis, Weinstein's representative
- Zach Grenier as Irwin Reiter, the Weinstein Co. accountant who leaked the O'Connor memo to Kantor
- Sean Cullen as Lance Maerov, board member of the Weinstein Co.
- Jason Babinsky as David Glasser, Weinstein Co. president
- Alex Hurt as jerk guy at bar

== Production ==
=== Development ===
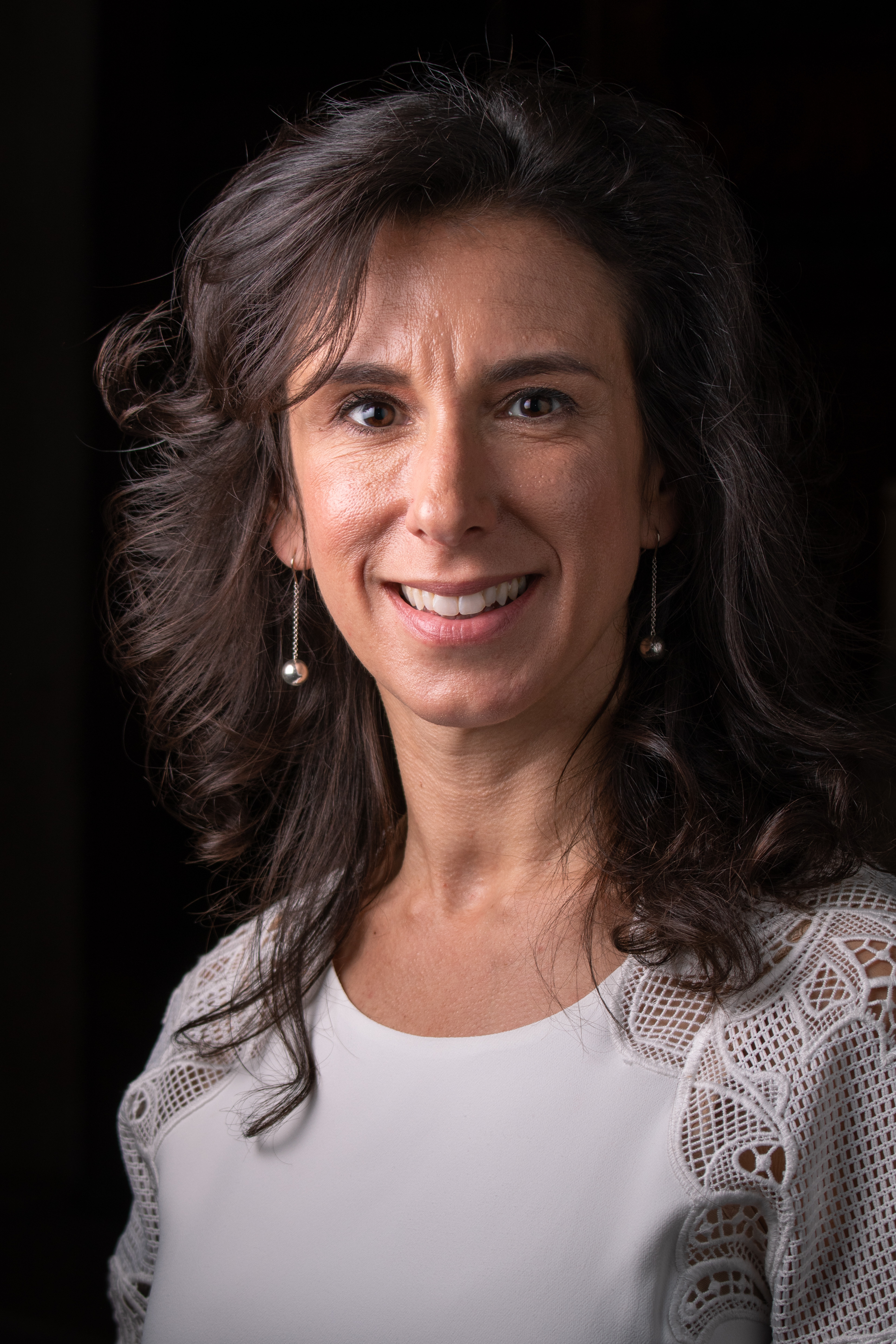
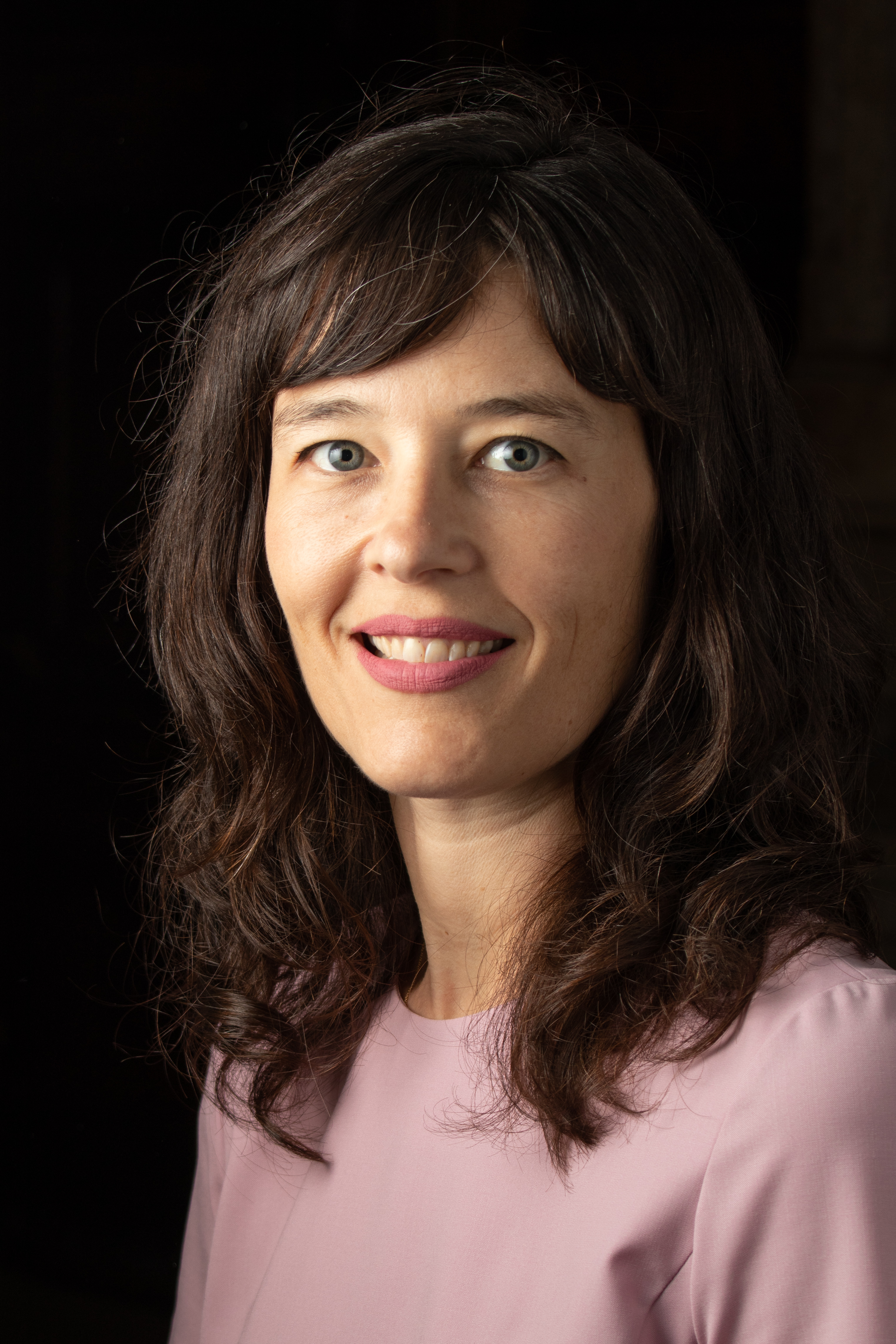
The film depicts the investigative work of Pulitzer Prize-winning journalists Jodi Kantor (left) and Megan Twohey.

On October 5, 2017, Jodi Kantor and Megan Twohey from The New York Times revealed substantial allegations of sexual misconduct by Hollywood producer Harvey Weinstein, accusing him of three decades of sexually harassing actresses, female production assistants, temps and other employees at Miramax and The Weinstein Company. The allegations served as a catalyst for the burgeoning #MeToo movement and eventually resulted in Weinstein being sentenced to 23 years of imprisonment.

In 2019, Kantor and Twohey published She Said, a book detailing the different processes they employed to investigate and uncover Weinstein's sexual misconduct. The rights to the book were optioned in 2018 by Annapurna Pictures and Plan B Entertainment. In June 2021, Universal Pictures announced they were developing an adaptation with Zoe Kazan and Carey Mulligan in negotiations to star as Kantor and Twohey. It was also reported Maria Schrader was attached to direct from a screenplay by Rebecca Lenkiewicz, with Brad Pitt, Dede Gardner and Jeremy Kleiner set to produce.

Schrader and Lenkiewicz said they wanted the film to be less focused on reenactments of Weinstein's abuse and harassment and more about the women who were silenced. Said Lenkeiwicz, "Although there is such darkness in the story...there is a lot of beauty and light in women finding each other."

=== Filming ===
In July 2021, filming began in New York City with cinematographer Natasha Braier. Filming took place at the Times' New York headquarters. By August, Patricia Clarkson, Andre Braugher, Samantha Morton, and Tom Pelphrey were announced as part of the cast. Adam Shapiro was confirmed to star in October 2021.

=== Controversy ===
Pitt's involvement with the film has received scrutiny as he was made aware of Weinstein's behavior in 1996 by his then-girlfriend Gwyneth Paltrow and later by his then-partner Angelina Jolie but continued to work with Weinstein after the fact, and because he was accused of abusing Jolie and their children in 2016.

In August 2022, Weinstein and his attorneys tried to delay his trial from its October 10, 2022 start date by claiming that the film's marketing and publicity would prejudice any Los Angeles jury against him; Los Angeles Superior Court Judge Lisa Lench denied the request.

=== Music ===
The film features original score composed by Nicholas Britell and cello performances by his wife Caitlin Sullivan. The album was released by Back Lot Music on November 18, 2022.

== Release ==
The film was theatrically released in the United States on November 18, 2022, coinciding with the then on-going Weinstein trial in Los Angeles. It premiered at the 60th New York Film Festival on October 13, 2022, and at the 66th BFI London Film Festival on October 14, 2022. It also screened at the TCL Chinese Theatre during the 2022 AFI Fest on November 4, 2022.

=== Home media ===
The film was made available for VOD on December 6, 2022, followed by a Blu-ray and DVD release on January 10, 2023.

== Reception ==
=== Box office ===
She Said grossed $5.8 million in the United States and Canada, and $8.1 million in other territories, for a worldwide total of $13.9 million. In the United States and Canada, She Said was released alongside The Menu, and was projected to gross $3–5 million from 2,022 theaters in its opening weekend. The film made $830,000 on its first day, including $160,000 from Thursday night previews. It went on to debut to $2.2 million, finishing sixth.

Deadline Hollywood called the opening total "a flop" and cited the "emotional exhaustion" of audiences, the perception of the film's "anticlimactic existence" since the Weinstein trials were still ongoing, and journalists "[not being] as interesting as they think they are" to the average person. They also noted that the trending lack of interest in awards season and auteur projects by the general public and the competition and overlapping demographics from holdovers Black Panther: Wakanda Forever and The Menu may have also played a role in the underperformance.

The Hollywood Reporter, which listed the film's debut among the worst-ever for a film playing in over 2,000 theaters and also noting audiences may not want to "re-litigate recent and ongoing scandals", said that films about Hollywood don't tend to play well outside Los Angeles and New York City, citing that the film's top 10 grossing theaters were on the coasts.

=== Critical response ===
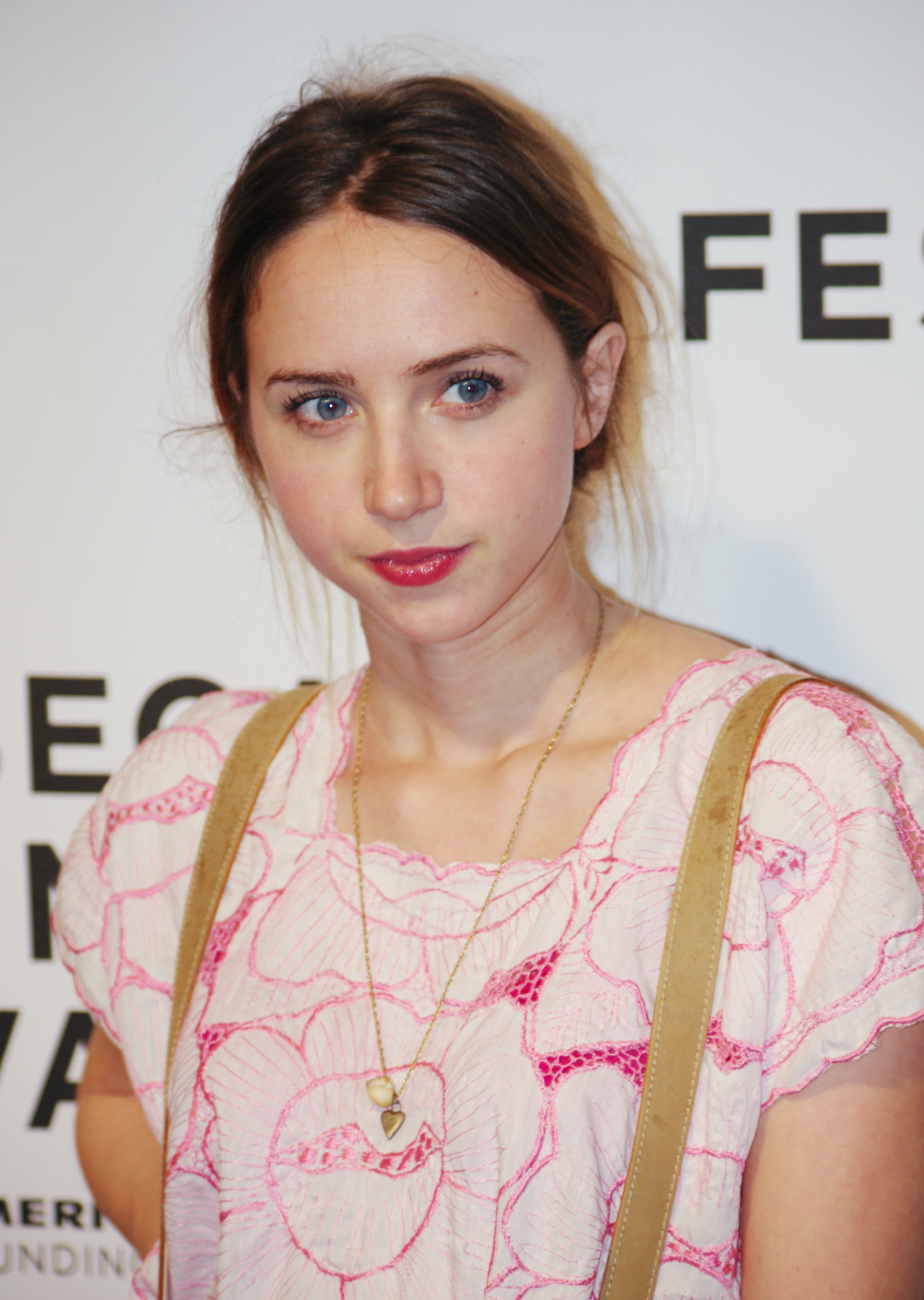
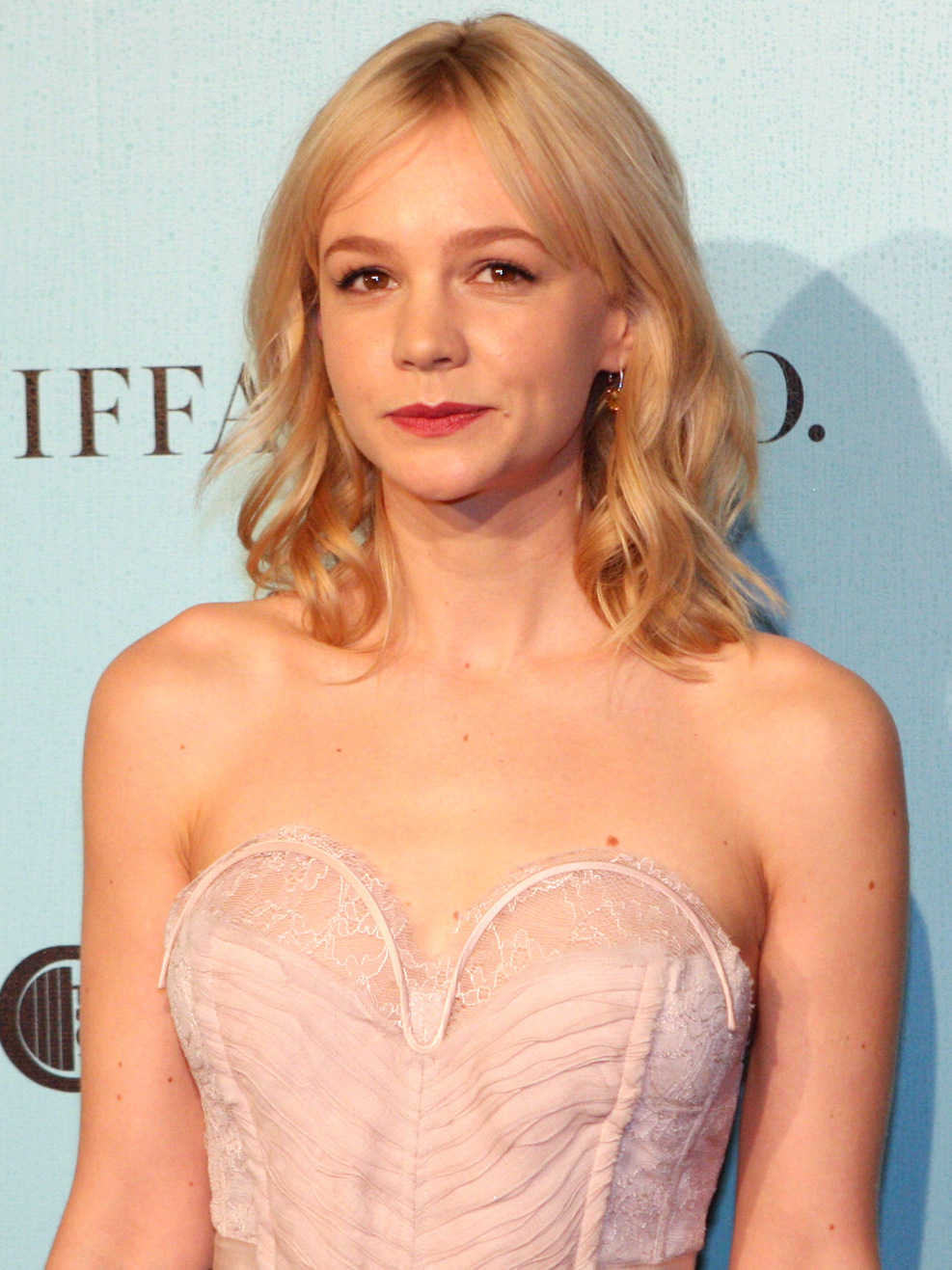
Zoe Kazan (left) and Carey Mulligan received praise for their performances as Kantor and Twohey.

On the review aggregator website Rotten Tomatoes, 88% of 274 critics' reviews are positive, with an average rating of 7.6/10. The website's consensus reads: "Although She Said struggles to add cinematic flair to its fact-based story, it remains a worthy, well-acted tribute to journalistic integrity." Metacritic, which uses a weighted average, assigned the film a score of 74 out of 100, based on 51 critics, indicating "generally favorable" reviews. Audiences polled by CinemaScore gave the film an average grade of "A" on an A+ to F scale, and those at PostTrak gave the film an 89% overall.

Writing for AP News, Jocelyn Noveck described the film as not only "a worthy entry to a film genre that includes Spotlight and of course All the President's Men", but also a testament to "the power of journalism... [and] courage, from the women who suffered sexual harassment or assault at Weinstein's hands and came forward at personal risk — to their careers, reputations or well-being."

Critics praised the film for its sensitivity to sexual assault survivors and its non-sensationalist approach, with Ann Hornaday of The Washington Post, commenting: "Schrader films She Said with a bracing combination of straightforwardness and sensitivity, staging the most prurient details of Weinstein's cases with somber restraint rather than salacious literalism." Kristy Puchko of Mashable wrote: "Sexual assault and harassment are not made a spectacle in She Said, as it was in the Fox News-centered docudrama Bombshell. Instead, the details of the allegations are shared, not shown... Schrader trusts we don't need to see what happened to believe these women's stories."

Rolling Stone's David Fear wrote there is "a genuine sense of how deep and how wide all of [Weinstein's] cover-ups went. It's a story about survivors, but also about systematic sexism, systematic abuse, systematic intimidation, systematic despair over anything changing. Only the last part gets partially redressed." Fear also noted the film "doesn't pretend that wrongs have been righted once and for all. It just wants to pay tribute to two people who stood up to a Goliath and took him down not with one good shot but a million tiny cuts and a lot of hard work."

Praise was given to Mulligan and Kazan, in addition to the ensemble cast. Kate Erbland of IndieWire wrote: "Megan may be the more outwardly cool, calm, and collected one, but Mulligan — always so good at playing women on the edge — brings obvious conflict to the role", while Justin Chang of NPR wrote: "Kazan emphasizes Kantor's empathy, her skill at building trust and coaxing information out of even the most reluctant sources." Entertainment Weekly's Leah Greenblatt wrote: "The ever-reliable Samantha Morton and Jennifer Ehle bring a tensile fury and vulnerability to two of the film's most memorable accusers, and Patricia Clarkson and Andre Braugher have the built-in gravitas to play Kantor and Twohey's suffer-no-fools editors as they methodically track down the tramautized, the complicit, and the less-than-innocent bystanders who will eventually allow them to publish their bombshell report."

Reviews also noted that the film marks a departure from previous journalism films by centering on the two women who broke the story. Stephanie Zacharek of Time wrote: "Instead of hardworking men in their shirtsleeves running around a newsroom, possibly making the occasional call home to check in on their wives and kids, in She Said we see Twohey... at home on maternity leave, struggling with postpartum depression, and Kantor thanking her preteen daughter for helping to pacify her younger, needier sister. As reporters, they're tireless. As moms, they're tired... That's what gives She Said its believable texture. That and the fact that, regardless of this story's ultimately explosive impact, She Said is simply a story of journalists at work." Peter Bradshaw of The Guardian commented: "I admire the way it takes the macho cliched nonsense out of journalism in movies: these are not boozy guys being adorable and chaotic, but smart, persistent people doggedly doing their job." Others were more mixed about the film's depiction of the journalists' home lives, with Noveck saying "there just isn't time for enough backstory, so [the scenes] feel cursory." Bloomberg News' Esther Zuckerman felt the scenes' inclusion made for a narratively disjointed film.

More critical reviews opined the film struggles to bring suspense or a sense of urgency to its story, since the events on which it is based are public knowledge. Scout Tafoya of RogerEbert.com described it as an "artless Wikipedia entry of an Oscar competitor." Though her review was generally positive, Greenblatt commented: "What the movie does to humanize both these women — and their skittish, often terrified witnesses — feels more fully realized than the procedural bits, which often tend to come off like a broad discourse on How Journalism Works." Puchko wrote: "Where She Said trips up is in its ardent need to play like a prestige biopic, wallowing in the heroes' noble intentions and important contributions to the world but forgetting that these characters should also be exciting to watch." Puchko added "Megan and Jodi [as characters] feel too polished to feel real", and concluded: "In short, She Said is good. But grubbiness could have made it great."

=== Accolades ===
Award	Date of ceremony	Category	Recipient(s)	Result	Ref.
Montclair Film Festival	October 21–30, 2022	David Carr Award for Truth in Non-Fiction Filmmaking	Maria Schrader	Won	
Coronado Island Film Festival	November 9–13, 2022	Best Narrative Feature Audience Award	She Said	Won	
Hollywood Music in Media Awards	November 16, 2022	Best Original Score in a Feature Film	Nicholas Britell	Nominated	
American Film Institute Awards	December 9, 2022	Top 10 Films of the Year	She Said	Won	
New York Film Critics Online	December 11, 2022	Top 10 Films of the Year	She Said	Won	
Las Vegas Film Critics Society	December 12, 2022	Best Adapted Screenplay	Rebecca Lenkiewicz	Nominated	
Washington D.C. Area Film Critics Association	December 12, 2022	Best Adapted Screenplay	Rebecca Lenkiewicz	Nominated	
St. Louis Film Critics Association	December 18, 2022	Best Film	She Said	Nominated	
St. Louis Film Critics Association	December 18, 2022	Best Supporting Actor	Andre Braugher	Nominated	
St. Louis Film Critics Association	December 18, 2022	Best Supporting Actress	Carey Mulligan	Nominated	
St. Louis Film Critics Association	December 18, 2022	Best Adapted Screenplay	Rebecca Lenkiewicz	Won	
Women Film Critics Circle	December 19, 2022	Best Movie About Women	She Said	Won	
Women Film Critics Circle	December 19, 2022	Best Woman Storyteller (Screenwriting Award)	Rebecca Lenkiewicz	Runner-up	
Women Film Critics Circle	December 19, 2022	Adrienne Shelly Award	She Said	Runner-up	
Nevada Film Critics Society	December 21, 2022	Best Film	She Said	Won	
Nevada Film Critics Society	December 21, 2022	Best Adapted Screenplay	Rebecca Lenkiewicz	Won	
Florida Film Critics Circle	December 22, 2022	Best Adapted Screenplay	Rebecca Lenkiewicz	Nominated	
Alliance of Women Film Journalists	January 5, 2023	Best Woman Director	Maria Schrader	Nominated	
Alliance of Women Film Journalists	January 5, 2023	Best Adapted Screenplay	Rebecca Lenkiewicz	Nominated	
Alliance of Women Film Journalists	January 5, 2023	Best Woman Screenwriter	Rebecca Lenkiewicz	Nominated	
San Francisco Bay Area Film Critics Circle	January 9, 2023	Best Adapted Screenplay	Rebecca Lenkiewicz	Nominated	
Golden Globe Awards	January 10, 2023	Best Supporting Actress – Motion Picture	Carey Mulligan	Nominated	
Georgia Film Critics Association	January 13, 2023	Best Adapted Screenplay	Rebecca Lenkiewicz	Nominated	
Critics' Choice Awards	January 15, 2023	Best Adapted Screenplay	Rebecca Lenkiewicz	Nominated	
Online Film Critics Society	January 23, 2023	Best Adapted Screenplay	Rebecca Lenkiewicz	Nominated	
AARP Movies for Grownups Awards	January 28, 2023	Best Screenwriter	Rebecca Lenkiewicz	Nominated	
AARP Movies for Grownups Awards	January 28, 2023	Best Ensemble	She Said	Won	
British Academy Film Awards	February 19, 2023	Best Supporting Actress	Carey Mulligan	Nominated	
British Academy Film Awards	February 19, 2023	Best Adapted Screenplay	Rebecca Lenkiewicz	Nominated	
Hollywood Critics Association	February 24, 2023	Best Adapted Screenplay	Rebecca Lenkiewicz	Nominated	
Satellite Awards	March 3, 2023	Best Adapted Screenplay	Rebecca Lenkiewicz	Nominated	
