= David Streitfeld =

American journalist (Pulitzer Prize)

David Streitfeld is an American journalist, best known for his reporting on books and technology. During his tenure as book reporter at The Washington Post, he definitively identified Joe Klein as the "Anonymous" author of the 1996 novel Primary Colors, upon which Klein admitted authorship, despite earlier denials.

== Career ==
During his career, Streitfeld wrote for The Washington Post, the Los Angeles Times, and, as of September 2025, is a technology reporter for The New York Times. Since 1999, he has reported from San Francisco.

=== Washington Post ===
At The Washington Post, Streitfeld covered books and publishing between 1987 and 1998; for three more years, he covered Silicon Valley and technology for the Post from San Francisco. In 1997, Streitfeld identified Joe Klein as Anonymous, the author of the bestselling book about the Clinton presidential campaign, Primary Colors. Streitfeld, a book collector, spotted a galley proof, a pre-publication version of the novel, listed for sale in an antiquarian bookseller's catalog. The proof reproduced handwritten changes, which Streitfeld sent to a handwriting expert, who compared the notes to Joe Klein's handwriting, confirming that he was the author.

Streitfeld has reported extensively on Amazon's business practices, dating back to the 1990s, when the company was primarily an online bookstore. In 1998, Streitfeld gave Jeff Bezos, the founder of Amazon, his first tour of the Washington Post, which Bezos purchased in 2013.

=== Los Angeles Times ===
In 2001, Streitfeld joined the Los Angeles Times as a technology reporter, later switching to covering Enron, housing, and general economics. In July 2006, the Atlantic magazine named him "The Bard of the Bubble" for his LA Times real estate coverage.

=== The New York Times ===
In 2007, Streitfeld joined The New York Times as Chicago business reporter and later covered technology subjects.

Streitfeld was one of a team of New York Times reporters who won the 2013 Pulitzer Prize for Explanatory Reporting for a series of 10 articles on the business practices of Apple and other technology companies. Streitfeld's contribution focused on freelance programmers and how hard it could be to make a living making apps for the iPhone.

In May 2014, Streitfeld broke the story of Amazon.com's negotiating tactics with publishing house Hachette, which he continued to cover for multiple months. The reporting on the topic by The New York Times and Streitfeld was the subject of a piece by The New York Times Public Editor Margaret Sullivan in October 2014.

In January 2015, Melville House published Gabriel Garcia Marquez: The Last Interview, a collection edited by Streitfeld. The introduction details his friendship with Marquez and the circumstances of their talks on two continents.

In August 2015, Streitfeld and New York Times colleague Jodi Kantor co-authored Inside Amazon: Wrestling Big Ideas in a Bruising Workplace.

Since 2015, Streitfeld has edited books in the "Last Interview" series for Melville House. The books collect interviews with authors. In addition to collections by Gabriel García Márquez, he edited volumes focused on Philip K. Dick, Ursula Le Guin, Hunter S. Thompson, and David Foster Wallace. Maureen Corrigan gave a favorable review to the Philip K. Dick collection on NPR's Fresh Air.

Streitfeld's biography Western Star: The Life and Legends of Larry McMurtry was published by Mariner Books in March 2026.

== Popular culture ==
Streitfeld's longtime friendship with science fiction author Elizabeth Hand inspired her Nebula Award-winning short story Echo.

== Awards ==
- 2013 Pulitzer Prize for Explanatory Reporting as part of a team reporting on the tech industry. Streitfeld's contribution was "As Boom Lures App Creators, Tough Part Is Making a Living", published on November 17, 2012.

== Personal life ==
Streitfeld is married and has a daughter. He lives near San Francisco, California, with a book collection exceeding 10,000 volumes. As a tech reporter, Streitfeld is reported to not use much technology outside of his job.

== Books ==
- Gabriel García Márquez: The Last Interview (as editor). Melville House (2015) ISBN 978-1-61219-480-6. A collection of interviews with the Nobel Prize-winning author, including two by Streitfeld.
- Philip K. Dick: The Last Interview and Other Conversations (as editor). Melville House (2015) ISBN 978-1-61219-526-1. A collection of interviews with the science fiction author, including the first one ever published and one conducted the day before his fatal stroke.
- J. D. Salinger: The Last Interview and Other Conversations (as editor). Melville House (2016) ISBN 978-1-61219-589-6.
- Hunter S. Thompson: The Last Interview and Other Conversations (as editor). Melville House (2018) ISBN 978-1-61219-693-0.
- David Foster Wallace: The Last Interview and Other Conversations (as editor). Melville House (2018) ISBN 978-1-61219-741-8. An expanded edition, with a new introduction by Streitfeld.
- Ursula K. Le Guin: The Last Interview (as editor). Melville House (2019) ISBN 978-1-61219-779-1.
- Western Star: The Life and Legends of Larry McMurtry. Mariner Books (2026). ISBN 978-0-06-323488-8.
