= Jack E. Davis =

American historian

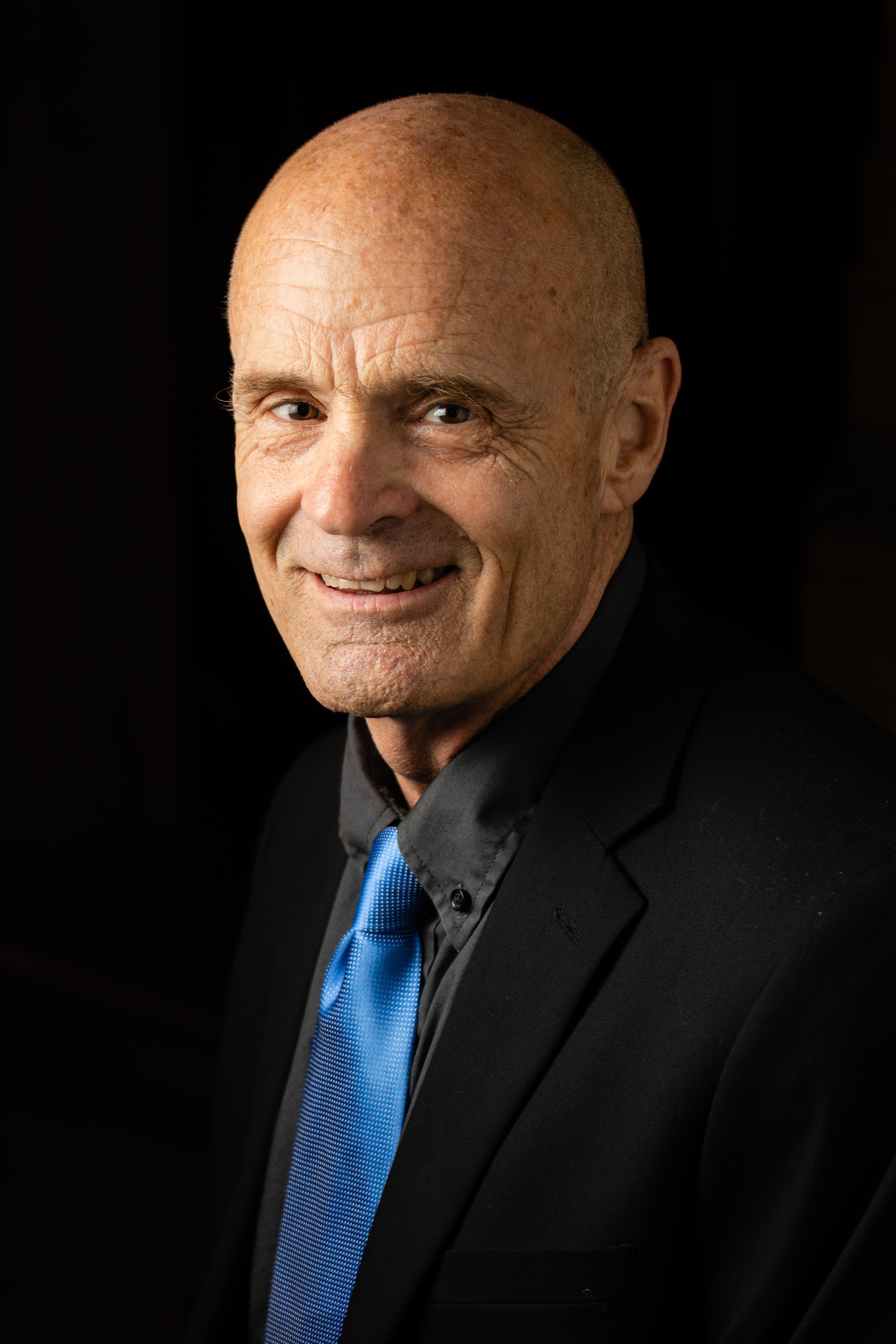
- Davis at the 2018 Pulitzer Prizes
- Born: July 13, 1956
- Education: Brandeis University
- Occupations: Historian, academic
- Employer: University of Florida
- Awards: Pulitzer Prize for History (The Gulf: The Making of an American Sea, 2018); Carnegie Fellow (2019, Andrew Carnegie Foundation)

Jack Emerson Davis is an American author and distinguished professor of history in Florida. He holds the Rothman Family Endowed Chair in the Humanities and teaches environmental history and sustainability studies at the University of Florida. In 2002-2003, he taught on a Fulbright award at the University of Jordan in Amman, Jordan.

Davis received the 2018 Pulitzer Prize for History for his book The Gulf: The Making of an American Sea. He also wrote An Everglades Providence: Marjory Stoneman Douglas and the American Environmental Century, a dual biography of Marjory Stoneman Douglas and the Florida Everglades; and Race Against Time: Culture and Separation in Natchez since 1930. With Raymond Arsenault, he edited Paradise Lost?: The Environmental History of Florida, a collection of essays on the history of the human relationship with Florida nature.

== Life ==
Davis earned a BA (1985) and MA (1989) from the University of South Florida, and a Ph.D. in 1994 from Brandeis University. Before joining the University of Florida faculty, he taught at the University of Alabama at Birmingham, where he was director of environmental studies. He also taught at Eckerd College.

Race Against Time: Culture and Separation in Natchez Since 1930 won the Charles S. Sydnor Prize for the best book in southern history published in 2001. An Everglades Providence (2009), received the Florida Book Award gold medal in the nonfiction category. In addition to winning a Pulitzer Prize, The Gulf: The Making of an American Sea was awarded the 2017 Kirkus Prize in nonfiction and was a finalist for the National Book Critics Circle Award. The book covers the history of Gulf of Mexico from geological formation to the present (2016).

His other works include The Wide Brim: Early Poems and Ponderings of Marjory Stoneman Douglas (2002); Making Waves: Female Activists in Twentieth-Century Florida (2003), edited by Kari Frederickson and Davis; and The Civil Rights Movement (2000).

== Works ==
- The Bald Eagle: The Improbable Journey of America's Bird. W W Norton & Co Inc 2022 ISBN 9781631495250
- The Gulf: The Making of an American Sea. W W Norton & Co Inc 2018. ISBN 9781631494024, OCLC 1037248759
- An Everglades Providence: Marjory Stoneman Douglas and the American Environmental Century Athens : Univ Of Georgia Press, 2011. ISBN 9780820337791, OCLC 696916151
- Race Against Time: Culture and Separation in Natchez since 1930. Baton Rouge, La. : Louisiana State University Press, 2001. ISBN 9780807130278, OCLC 56654733
- The Wide Brim: Early Poems and Ponderings of Marjory Stoneman Douglas (Florida History and Culture) April 15, 2002;
- Making Waves: Female Activists in Twentieth-Century Florida Gainesville : University Press of Florida, 2003. ISBN 9780813027678, OCLC 50348066
- The Civil Rights Movement Malden (Mass.); Oxford : Blackwell, 2001. ISBN 9780631220442, OCLC 491974296

=== Edited ===
- Raymond Arsenault (eds), Paradise Lost?: The Environmental History of Florida, Gainesville: University Press of Florida, 2005. ISBN 9780813028262, OCLC 474889496
