= The Bald Eagle: The Improbable Journey of America's Bird =

2022 book by Jack E. Davis

- Author: Jack E. Davis
- Language: English
- Subject: Bald eagles
- Publisher: Liveright
- Publication date: March 1, 2022
- Pages: 432
- ISBN: 978-1-63149-525-0

The Bald Eagle: The Improbable Journey of America's Bird is a 2022 book by Jack E. Davis that examines bald eagles in the United States. As of the publication of the book, Davis was an environmental history professor at the University of Florida.

== Summary ==
Contrary to popular belief, the turkey was never considered as the national bird, and the bald eagle is not the national bird (the US has never designated one). Embodying the values of fidelity, self reliance and courage, the bald eagle became the United States Congress's choice in 1782 for the face of the Great Seal of the United States. The book tells how the public's views of bald eagle were divided. While some considered it as a symbol of self reliance and independence, many considered them as ferocious and harming. Eagles were nearly driven to extinction by the start of 20th century by both farmers and naturalists alike.

== Reception ==
Vicki Constantine Croke from The New York Times says that "Davis...makes clear in his rollicking, poetic, wise new book that cultural and political history are an integral part of this natural history, not to be omitted if we want to tell the whole story ... Along with the famous humans, Davis never neglects the birds themselves ... With eagle numbers now estimated at levels they were before 'America became America,' their comeback is astonishing". Bill Heavey from The Wall Street Journal stated "... an impressive work of scholarship by Mr. Davis ... Mr. Davis succeeds in making the history of the bird accessible to general readers ... At the same time, there are parts of it that read like a textbook. The 30-page chapter on how the eagle made it onto the national seal—a process that involved three congressional committees, nine delegates, three artists and a consultant —provides more detail than you may want."
