= God's Perfect Child =

1999 Non-fiction book by Caroline Fraser

- First edition
- Author: Caroline Fraser
- Language: English
- Subject: Christian Science and The First Church of Christ, Scientist
- Genre: Non-fiction
- Publisher: Metropolitan Books
- Publication date: 1999
- Publication place: United States
- Pages: 656 (2019 Picador edition)
- ISBN: 978-1250219046
- OCLC: 1050277946
- Website: www.godsperfectchild.com/

God's Perfect Child: Living and Dying in the Christian Science Church (1999) is a book by the American writer Caroline Fraser about Christian Science and her upbringing within it. First published in New York by Metropolitan Books, an anniversary edition with a new afterword by Fraser was released in 2019 by Picador.

Fraser writes about her upbringing, describing her mother as a "classic fair-weather Christian Scientist" who used medicine and gave it to her children, but her father as extreme in his beliefs. Fraser recalls being taught by her Christian Science father, who had a PhD from Columbia University, that matter was not real: "[M]atter was Error and error did not exist." In the 2019 afterword, Fraser describes her father's painful death from gangrene in his foot and his refusal to seek medical treatment for it, preferring to rely instead on Christian Science prayer.

The first half of the book is a critical biography of Mary Baker Eddy which analyzes many controversies surrounding her life and the founding of the Christian Science church. The second half of the book covers two major incidents in the twentieth-century church. The first involves child mortality under the care of Christian Science practitioners, and the church's alleged attempts to whitewash the deaths and their successful lobbying for exemption from legal liability in all fifty U.S. states. The second involves serious financial mismanagement in the church itself, in which the name of the award-winning The Christian Science Monitor was allegedly exploited by outside interests for a failed television program which nearly bankrupted not only the Monitor but also the Mother Church itself and caused significant issues at both organizations. Fraser believes the rigid church structure set up by Eddy became a barrier to transparency and accountability processes which might have arisen under a more typical Christian church structure.

Reviewing the book, fellow critic of Christian Science Martin Gardner wrote in 1999: "No one has written more entertainingly and accurately than Fraser about the history of Christian Science after Mrs. Eddy died in 1910. No one has more colorfully covered the church's endless bitter schisms and bad judgments that have dogged it and in recent years almost plunged it into bankruptcy." According to Philip Zaleski, in a New York Times review: Fraser's "bitterness gives this book its bite; it also makes for edgy reading, as one awaits the next razor cut against Christian Science or its founder. Few darker portraits of Eddy have emerged since the days when Mark Twain called her 'a brass god with clay legs.' One ends up wondering how Eddy, with all her sharp edges, managed to captivate so many for so long". Jana Riess has faulted Fraser for relying exclusively on secondary sources critical of Eddy, writing "Fraser never analyzes these caricatures, or stops to consider how heavily they are gender-biased. In her portrait, no subtlety or complexity of character is permissible. It is almost as if, in losing her childhood model of Eddy as savior, she could only substitute another childhood Disney character in its stead: the villainess." However, Riess also writes that "Fraser's book improves markedly as she enters the era she knows personally. The brightest sections deal with Christian Science and the law."
