= Caroline Fraser =

American writer

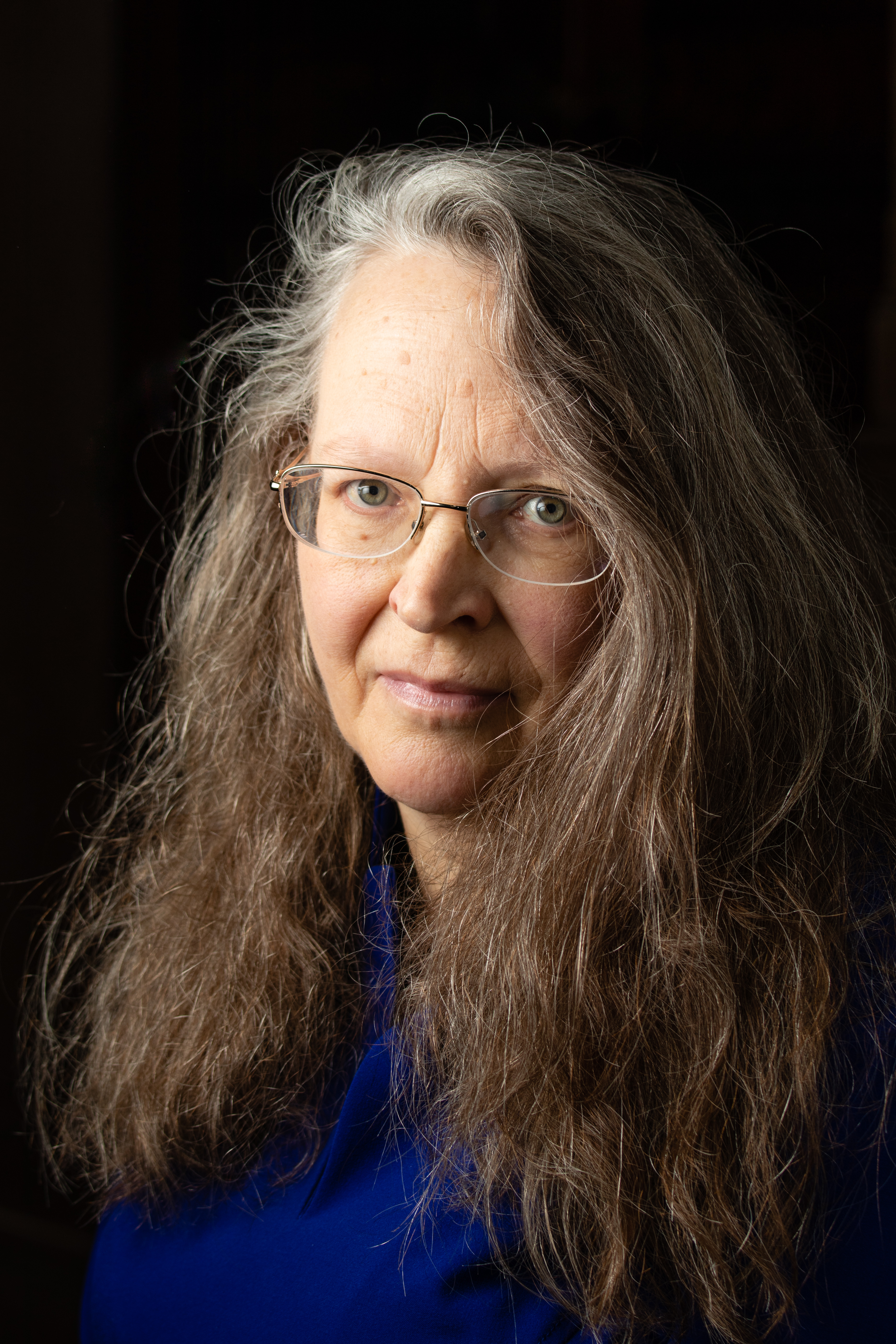
- Fraser at the 2018 Pulitzer Prizes.
- Born: Seattle, Washington, U.S.
- Education: Mercer Island High School; Harvard University
- Awards: Pulitzer Prize for Biography (2018); National Book Critics Circle Award for Biography (Prairie Fires, 2017)

Caroline Fraser is an American writer. She won the 2018 Pulitzer Prize for Biography or Autobiography, and the 2017 National Book Critics Circle Award in Biography, for Prairie Fires: The American Dreams of Laura Ingalls Wilder, a biography of American author Laura Ingalls Wilder.

== Early life and education ==
Fraser was born in Seattle to a Christian Science family. In 1979 she graduated from Mercer Island High School, and in 1987 she earned a PhD in English and American literature from Harvard University for a thesis entitled A Perfect Contempt: The Poetry of James Merrill.

== Career ==
Formerly on the editorial staff of the New Yorker, Fraser's work has also appeared in The Atlantic Monthly and New York Review of Books, among others. She is the author of God's Perfect Child: Living and Dying in the Christian Science Church (1999), which describes the practices of the Christian Science church and her upbringing within it. Whitney Balliett, himself a former Christian Scientist, described the book as a "critical history that ... casts a clear, merciless light" on the religion.

Fraser's other books are Rewilding the World: Dispatches from the Conservation Revolution (2009), which presents a broad vision of global ecological conservation; and Prairie Fires: The American Dreams of Laura Ingalls Wilder (2017), the Pulitzer Prize-winning book about the life of Laura Ingalls Wilder. She is also the editor of the two volumes of the Library of America's Laura Ingalls Wilder: The Little House Books (2012).

== Awards and honors ==
- 2017 National Book Critics Circle Award in Biography for Prairie Fires
- 2018 Pulitzer Prize for Biography or Autobiography for Prairie Fires
- 2018 Chicago Tribune Heartland Prize for Prairie Fires

== Selected works ==
=== Books ===
- Murderland: Crime and Bloodlust in the Time of Serial Killers, Penguin Press, 2025.
- Prairie Fires: The American Dreams of Laura Ingalls Wilder, Metropolitan Books, 2017.
- (ed.), Laura Ingalls Wilder: The Little House Books, Volumes 1 and 2, Library of America, 2012.
- Rewilding the World: Dispatches from the Conservation Revolution, Metropolitan Books, 2009.
- God's Perfect Child: Living and Dying in the Christian Science Church, Metropolitan Books, 1999.

=== Articles ===
- "The Throwaway Planet" (review of Alexander Clapp, Waste Wars: The Wild Afterlife of Your Trash, Little, Brown, 390 pp.; Colin McFarlane, Waste and the City: The Crisis of Sanitation and the Right to Citylife, Verso, 312 pp.; Jared Sullivan, Valley So Low: One Lawyer's Fight for Justice in the Wake of America's Great Coal Catastrophe, Knopf, 366 pp.), The New York Review of Books, vol. LXXIII, no. 7 (23 April 2026), pp. 18, 20, 22. "The particulars of these works may differ, but the Miltonic corporate devilry is the same, revealing the arrogance of the false deities of a capitalism that makes hell out of heaven, aided by a host of infernal demons: Incompetence, Venality, and Deception. ... Read them while you can, while you still have breath in your body, because they are chronicling the end of the world as we once knew it." (p. 22.)
- "Peter Rabbit and the Tale of a Fierce Bad Publisher", The Horn Book Magazine, May 7, 2013.
- "For Wolves on the Brink, A Hobbled Recovery Plan", Yale Environment 360, October 25, 2012.
- "Laura Ingalls Wilder and the Wolves", Los Angeles Review of Books, October 10, 2012.
- "The Crucial Role of Predators: A New Perspective on Ecology", Yale Environment 360, September 15, 2011.
- "As Tigers Near Extinction, A Last-Ditch Strategy Emerges", Yale Environment 360, November 15, 2010.
- "‘A Strange, Bloody, Broken Beauty’", The New York Review of Books, May 27, 2010.
- "'Rewilding' the World: A Bright Spot for Biodiversity", Yale Environment 360, February 11, 2010.
- "So Fresh and Bloody", London Review of Books, December 18, 2008.
- "Heart of Darkness", The New York Review of Books, June 24, 2004.
- "The Mormon Murder Case", The New York Review of Books, November 21, 2002.
- "Pretty in the Sunlight", The New York Review of Books, October 4, 2001.
- "Mary Baker Eddy: 'Mere Historic Incidents'", chapter one of God's Perfect Child, The New York Times, August 22, 1999.
- "Suffering Children and the Christian Science Church", The Atlantic, April 1995.
- "The Prairie Queen", The New York Review of Books, December 22, 1994.
