= Prairie Fires =

2017 biography of Laura Ingalls Wilder by Caroline Fraser

- First edition cover
- Author: Caroline Fraser
- Subject: Laura Ingalls Wilder
- Publisher: Metropolitan Books
- Publication date: 2017

Prairie Fires: The American Dreams of Laura Ingalls Wilder is a 2017 biography of Little House on the Prairie author Laura Ingalls Wilder, by Caroline Fraser. It was awarded the 2018 Pulitzer Prize for Biography or Autobiography, the National Book Critics Circle Award for Biography, and the Chicago Tribune Heartland Prize.
