= 2018 Pulitzer Prize =

Awards for journalism and related fields

The 2018 Pulitzer Prizes were awarded by the Pulitzer Prize Board for work during the 2017 calendar year. Prize winners and nominated finalists were announced by Dana Canedy at 3:00 p.m. EST on April 16, 2018.

The New York Times won the most awards of any newspaper, with three, bringing its total to one hundred and twenty-five Pulitzer Prizes. The Washington Post won Investigative Reporting and National Reporting, the latter of which was shared with The New York Times. The New York Times and The New Yorker won the prize in public service, bringing their totals to 125 and five, respectively. The Press-Democrat won Breaking News Reporting, bringing its total to two prizes. The staff of The Arizona Republic and USA Today won for explanatory reporting; The Cincinnati Enquirer for local reporting about the heroin epidemic; and Reuters won international reporting.

In letters, drama, and music, Kendrick Lamar's Damn won the music prize, the first non-classical and non-jazz work to win the award.

== Journalism ==
Public Service
The New York Times, for reporting led by Jodi Kantor and Megan Twohey, and The New Yorker, for reporting by Ronan Farrow, "for explosive, impactful journalism that exposed powerful and wealthy sexual predators, including allegations against [Harvey Weinstein,] one of Hollywood's most influential producers, bringing them to account for long-suppressed allegations of coercion, brutality and victim silencing, thus spurring a worldwide reckoning about sexual abuse of women."
Kansas City Star "For courageous, revelatory journalism that exposed a state government's decades–long "obsession with secrecy," intended to shield executive decisions and suppress transparency and accountability in law enforcement agencies, child welfare services and other sectors of the government."

Breaking News Reporting
The Press Democrat staff "For lucid and tenacious coverage of historic wildfires that ravaged the city of Santa Rosa and Sonoma County, expertly utilizing an array of tools, including photography, video and social media platforms, to bring clarity to its readers—in real time and in subsequent in-depth reporting."
Houston Chronicle staff "For comprehensive and dynamic coverage of Hurricane Harvey that captured real-time developments of the unprecedented scale of the disaster and provided crucial information to its community during the storm and its aftermath."
The New York Times staff "For authoritative and innovative coverage of the [2017 Las Vegas shooting], the deadliest mass shooting in modern American history at a concert in Las Vegas, using poignant storytelling as well as groundbreaking video analysis and motion graphics to illustrate how the attack unfolded."

Investigative Reporting
The Washington Post staff "For purposeful and relentless reporting that changed the course of a Senate race in Alabama by revealing [Roy Moore]'s alleged past sexual harassment of teenage girls and subsequent efforts to undermine the journalism that exposed it."
Carol Marbin Miller and Audra D.S. Burch of Miami Herald "For a sweeping investigation of Florida's juvenile justice system, prompted by the tragic death of a foster child and told in heartbreaking detail, that spurred legislative reform intended to better protect that states' young charges."
Tim Eberly of The Virginian-Pilot "for compelling reporting that resulted in changes to Virginia's parole board system, which operated for decades behind closed doors, designating first-time convicts as repeat offenders under the state's three-strikes law and condemning them to longer sentences than some murderers, with no hope of parole."

Explanatory Reporting
The Arizona Republic and USA Today Network "for vivid and timely reporting that masterfully combined text, video, podcasts and virtual reality to examine, from multiple perspectives, the difficulties and unintended consequences of fulfilling President Trump's pledge to construct a wall along the U.S. border with Mexico."
Michael Kimmelman of The New York Times "for an ambitious series that explained with verve, lyricism and exceptional clarity the complex impact of climate change on cities around the world."
Staff of ProPublica "for a sobering examination of why the United States has one of the highest rates of maternal deaths in the developed world, and why at least half are preventable."

Local Reporting
The Cincinnati Enquirer staff "for a riveting and insightful narrative and video documenting seven days of greater Cincinnati's heroin epidemic, revealing how the deadly addiction has ravaged families and communities."
Jason Grotto, Sandhya Kambhampati and Ray Long of Chicago Tribune and ProPublica Illinois "for deep reporting that included analysis of more than 100 million electronic tax records to show how systemic favoritism and political neglect influenced assessments at the expense of the working class and poor in majority black and Latino neighborhoods."
Staff of The Boston Globe "for a poignant and illuminating exploration of the city's fraught history of race relations that went beyond the anecdotal, using data to demonstrate how racism infiltrates every institution and aspect of city life."

National Reporting
Staffs of The New York Times and The Washington Post "for deeply sourced, relentlessly reported coverage in the public interest that dramatically furthered the nation's understanding of Russian interference in the 2016 presidential election and its connections to the Trump campaign, the President-elect's transition team and his eventual administration. (The New York Times entry, submitted in this category, was moved into contention by the Board and then jointly awarded the Prize.)"
Amy Julia Harris and Shoshana Walter of Reveal from The Center for Investigative Reporting "for poignantly exposing a shocking practice that took root in Oklahoma, Arkansas and other states in which, under the guise of criminal justice reform, judges steered defendants into drug rehabs that were little more than lucrative work camps for private industry."
Brett Murphy of USA Today Network "for a graceful, data-driven narrative populated by the truckers who transport goods from America's ports—spirited characters exploited by some of the country's largest and best-known companies."

International Reporting
Clare Baldwin, Andrew R.C. Marshall and Manuel Mogato of Reuters "for relentless reporting that exposed the brutal killing campaign behind Philippines President Rodrigo Duterte's war on drugs.."
Staff of Associated Press "for a devastating series that vividly showed that the human cost of the U.S.-led defeat of the Islamic State in the northern Iraqi city of Mosul was far greater than acknowledged."
Staff of BuzzFeed News "for a stunning probe across two continents that proved that operatives with apparent ties to Vladimir Putin have engaged in a targeted killing campaign against his perceived enemies on British and American soil."

Feature Writing
Rachel Kaadzi Ghansah, freelance reporter, GQ "for an unforgettable portrait of murderer Dylann Roof, using a unique and powerful mix of reportage, first-person reflection and analysis of the historical and cultural forces behind his killing of nine people inside Emanuel AME Church in Charleston, S.C.
John Woodrow Cox of The Washington Post "for a gripping portfolio of stories rendered with keen observation and graceful yet simple writing that presents the horror of gun violence from an entirely new perspective: through the eyes of children."
Norimitsu Onishi of The New York Times "for a literary masterwork of observation that painted a portrait of the last days of Japan's isolated elders, who are housed in iconic apartment complexes where they prepare for deaths they hope will be noticed and tended to by their quiet neighbors."

Commentary
John Archibald of Alabama Media Group "for lyrical and courageous commentary that is rooted in Alabama but has a national resonance in scrutinizing corrupt politicians, championing the rights of women and calling out hypocrisy."
Jelani Cobb of The New Yorker "for combining masterful writing with a deep knowledge of history and a deft reporter's touch to bring context and clarity to the issue of race at a time when respectful dialogue on the subject often gives way to finger-pointing and derision."
Steve Lopez of Los Angeles Times "for graceful columns rich in detail that vividly illustrated how the crippling cost of housing in California is becoming an existential crisis for the state."

Criticism
Jerry Saltz of New York "for a robust body of work that conveyed a canny and often daring perspective on visual art in America, encompassing the personal, the political, the pure and the profane."
Carlos Lozada of The Washington Post "for criticism that dug deep into the books that have shaped political discourse — engaging seriously with scholarly works, partisan screeds and popular works of history and biography to produce columns and essays that plumbed the cultural and political genealogy of our current national divide."
Manohla Dargis of The New York Times "for writing, both downbeat and uplifting, that demonstrated the critic's sustained dedication to exposing male dominance in Hollywood and decrying the exploitation of women in the film business."

Editorial Writing
Andie Dominick of The Des Moines Register "for examining in a clear, indignant voice, free of cliché or sentimentality, the damaging consequences for poor Iowa residents of privatizing the state's administration of Medicaid."
Editorial staff of The New York Times "for a powerfully articulated and vivid nine-part editorial series that eloquently argued that people with a history of domestic violence should not be allowed to possess firearms."
Sharon Gigsby of The Dallas Morning News "for extraordinary and persuasive editorials that contended that Baylor University was dramatically failing the survivors of sexual assault on campus, arguments that forced readers and the university itself to confront the damage caused not only by the denigration of women but also by obfuscation, cover-ups and lies."

Editorial Cartooning
Jake Halpern and Michael Sloan of The New York Times "for an emotionally powerful series, told in graphic narrative form, that chronicled the daily struggles of a real-life family of refugees and its fear of deportation."
Mark Fiore, freelance cartoonist, "for clever, multi-dimensional editorial cartoons that set a high bar for video and biting political satire in an increasingly digital journalism universe, resulting in animation that is simple but powerful and may help engage a younger audience at a time when the industry is seeking to capture new viewers and readers."
Mike Thompson of Detroit Free Press "for a provocative, nuanced and impactful portfolio of editorial cartoons that took on a variety of social issues, including, health care, police brutality, sexual harassment and education, through traditional panels and digital animation."

Breaking News Photography
Ryan Kelly of The Daily Progress "for a chilling image that reflected the photographer's reflexes and concentration in capturing the moment of impact of a car attack during a racially charged protest in Charlottesville, Va."
Ivor Prickett, freelance photographer, The New York Times "for heartbreaking and frightening images that brought a fresh approach to classic war photography and gave an intimate view of the impact on shell-shocked survivors of what ISIS left behind in Mosul and Raqqa."

Feature Photography
Photography staff of Reuters "for shocking photographs that exposed the world to the violence Rohingya refugees faced in fleeing Myanmar. (Moved by the Board from the Breaking News Photography category, where it was entered.)"
Kevin Freyer, freelance photographer, Getty Images "for profoundly moving and historic pictures that portrayed Rohingya Muslims with dignity and grace as they fled ethnic cleansing in Myanmar."
Lisa Krantz of San Antonio Express-News "for intimate, poetic images that captured the vibrant life of a boy born with an incurable, rare disorder, and his physical, spiritual and emotional journey."
Meridith Kohut, freelance photographer, The New York Times "for wrenching images from the streets, homes and hospitals of Venezuela, where government policies have resulted in widespread malnutrition and starvation of children."

== Letters, Drama, and Music ==
Fiction
Less by Andrew Sean Greer, "a generous book, musical in its prose and expansive in its structure and range, about growing older and the essential nature of love."
In the Distance by Hernán Díaz, "a gorgeously written novel that charts one man's growth from boyhood to mythic status as he journeys between continents and the extremes of the human condition."
The Idiot by Elif Batuman, "a tender, funny portrait, devoid of sentimentality, of a young woman during a disorienting and pivotal year in college, where she learns the intricacies of language and love."

Drama
Cost of Living by Martyna Majok, "an honest, original work that invites audiences to examine diverse perceptions of privilege and human connection through two pairs of mismatched individuals: a former trucker and his recently paralyzed ex-wife, and an arrogant young man with cerebral palsy and his new caregiver."
Everybody by Branden Jacobs-Jenkins, "for a contemporary take on a classic morality play that offers a playful and colloquial examination of the human condition in the face of mortality."
The Minutes by Tracy Letts, "a shocking drama set in a seemingly mundane city council meeting that acidly articulates a uniquely American toxicity that feels both historic and contemporary."

History
The Gulf: The Making of an American Sea by Jack E. Davis, "an important environmental history of the Gulf of Mexico that brings crucial attention to Earth's 10th-largest body of water, one of the planet's most diverse and productive marine ecosystems."
Fear City: New York's Fiscal Crisis and the Rise of Austerity Politics by Kim Phillips-Fein, "a fine work of historical craftsmanship that revises conventional wisdom about New York's 1975 fiscal crisis and its aftermath with sensitivity, empathy and clarity."
Hitler in Los Angeles: How Jews Foiled Nazi Plots Against Hollywood and America by Steven J. Ross, "for a terrifying, revelatory and inspiring masterpiece that probes the flourishing fascism of 1930s America, and the power of popular resistance to combat an alliance of Nazism, the Ku Klux Klan and other homegrown paramilitary groups."

Biography or Autobiography
Prairie Fires: The American Dreams of Laura Ingalls Wilder, by Caroline Fraser, "a first-person elegy for home and father that examines with controlled emotion the past and present of an embattled region."
Richard Nixon: The Life, by John A. Farrell, "a tale that presents Nixon from boyhood to senator, power broker and president, in all of his complexity and contradiction."
Robert Lowell, Setting the River on Fire: A Study of Genius, Mania, and Character, by Kay Redfield Jamison, "a superb examination of the life, work and struggles of Robert Lowell, which painstakingly explores the bipolar disorder that plagued the poet and elicits greater understanding of the relationship between mania and creativity."

Poetry
Half-light: Collected Poems 1965–2016, by Frank Bidart, "a volume of unyielding ambition and remarkable scope that mixes long dramatic poems with short elliptical lyrics, building on classical mythology and reinventing forms of desires that defy societal norms."
Incendiary Art, by Patricia Smith, "a searing portrait of the violence exacted against the bodies of African-American men in America and the grief of the women who mourn them, infused with a formal virtuosity emblematic of the poet's aesthetic sophistication and savvy linguistic play."
semiautomatic, by Evie Shockley, "a brilliant leap of faith into the echoing abyss of language, part rap, part rant, part slam, part performance art, that leaves the reader unsettled, challenged—and bettered—by the poet's words."

General Nonfiction
Locking Up Our Own: Crime and Punishment in Black America, by James Forman Jr., "an examination of the historical roots of contemporary criminal justice in the U.S., based on vast experience and deep knowledge of the legal system, and its often-devastating consequences for citizens and communities of color."
Notes on a Foreign Country: An American Abroad in a Post-America World, by Suzy Hansen, "a brave and disturbing account of what it means to be an American in the world during the first decades of the 21st century."
The Evolution of Beauty: How Darwin's Forgotten Theory of Mate Choice Shapes the Animal World—and Us by Richard O. Prum, "A fascinating, nuanced and compelling account of the potentially unsettling implications surrounding sexual selection."

Music
Damn, by Kendrick Lamar, "a virtuosic song collection unified by its vernacular authenticity and rhythmic dynamism that offers affecting vignettes capturing the complexity of modern African-American life."
Quartet, by Michael Gilbertson, "a masterwork in a traditional format, the string quartet, that is unconstrained by convention or musical vogues and possesses a rare capacity to stir the heart."
Sound from the Bench, by Ted Hearne, "a five-movement cantata for chamber choir, electric guitar and percussion that raises oblique questions about the crosscurrents of power through excerpts from sources as diverse as Supreme Court rulings and ventriloquism textbooks."

== Special citations ==
No special citations were awarded this year.
