= Ron Lieber =

American journalist

- Born: 1971 (age 54–55); Chicago, Illinois
- Education: Amherst College (BA)
- Occupation: Journalist
- Notable credit(s): The New York Times, The Wall Street Journal
- Spouse: Jodi Kantor
- Children: 2

Ron Lieber (born 1971) is an American journalist for The New York Times, where he writes the "Your Money" column. He is the recipient of three Gerald Loeb awards for his writing in the column. He previously wrote the "Green Thumb" column for the Wall Street Journal.

== Early life and education ==
Lieber grew up in Chicago, Illinois. He attended the full 14-years of grade school at Francis W. Parker School, a private school in Chicago, becoming a scholarship student after his parents divorced.

Expecting to continue living in the Chicago area after college, Lieber decided to choose a school outside the Midwest, attending Amherst College on scholarships and financial aid. He was inspired to try writing for the Student, the school alumni magazine, after reading the work of Chris Miller in the publication. The summer after his junior year, he interned with the Daily Hampshire Gazette for three months. He graduated in 1993.

== Career ==
Lieber began his career in 1993 as a reporter for Lawyers Weekly USA in Boston, a legal newspaper for small law firms. His boss inspired him to want to work for The Wall Street Journal by bringing him clippings of Edward Felsenthal's articles . He moved on to work as a staff reporter for the Fast Company and Fortune.

In 2002, Lieber joined The Wall Street Journal. He was hired by Felsenthal as a founding member of the Personal Journal team. He wrote the "Green Thumb" managing-your-money column until he left in 2007.

Lieber helped start FiLife in 2007 as the managing editor. FiLife, a joint venture of Dow Jones and IAC, was a personal finance website aimed at younger readers. Lieber said the name was "a semi-mashup of Financial Life and High Life."

Lieber left FiLife in 2008 to join The New York Times as a financial columnist. He writes the "Your Money" column, which earned him three Gerald Loeb awards.

In 2023, Lieber introduced an online course on merit aid.

== Personal life ==
Lieber is married to Jodi Kantor, a Pulitzer Prize-winning journalist for The New York Times. They live in Brooklyn with their two daughters.

== Awards ==
- 2011: Gerald Loeb Award for Personal Finance business journalism for "Student Debt"
- 2018: Gerald Loeb Award for Personal Finance business journalism for "The Equifax Breach"
- 2019: Gerald Loeb award for Personal Service business journalism for "The Daunting Road to Loan Forgiveness"

== Selected bibliography ==
- Taking Time Off, co-written with Colin Hall, 1996, Noonday Press
- Upstart Start-Ups, 1998, Broadway Books
- Best Entry-Level Jobs: Paying Your Dues Without Losing Your Mind, 2004,Random House
- "Student Debt" articles in The New York Times, winner of a 2011 Gerald Loeb award:
  - "Placing the Blame as Students Are Buried in Debt", May 29, 2010
  - "Student Debt And a Push For Fairness", June 5, 2010
  - "What Love Joins Together, Debt Can Put Asunder", September 4, 2010
- The Opposite of Spoiled: Raising Kids Who Are Grounded, Generous, and Smart About Money, 2015, Harper
- "The Daunting Road to Loan Forgiveness" articles in The New York Times, winner of a 2019 Gerald Loeb award:
  - "A Student Loan Fix for a Teacher", March 30, 2018
  - "A $350 Million Fund Helps Many Public Servants. Meet the Ones Left Out.", April 6, 2018
  - "Who Is a Public Servant? Borrowers Have a Lot Riding on the Answer", April 13, 2018
  - "The Public Student Loan Forgiveness Rescue Hasn’t Gone Well So Far", October 17, 2018
  - "A Teacher’s Long Road to Student Loan Forgiveness (and a $4,500 Surprise)", December 7, 2018
