= Jodi Kantor =

American journalist (born 1975)

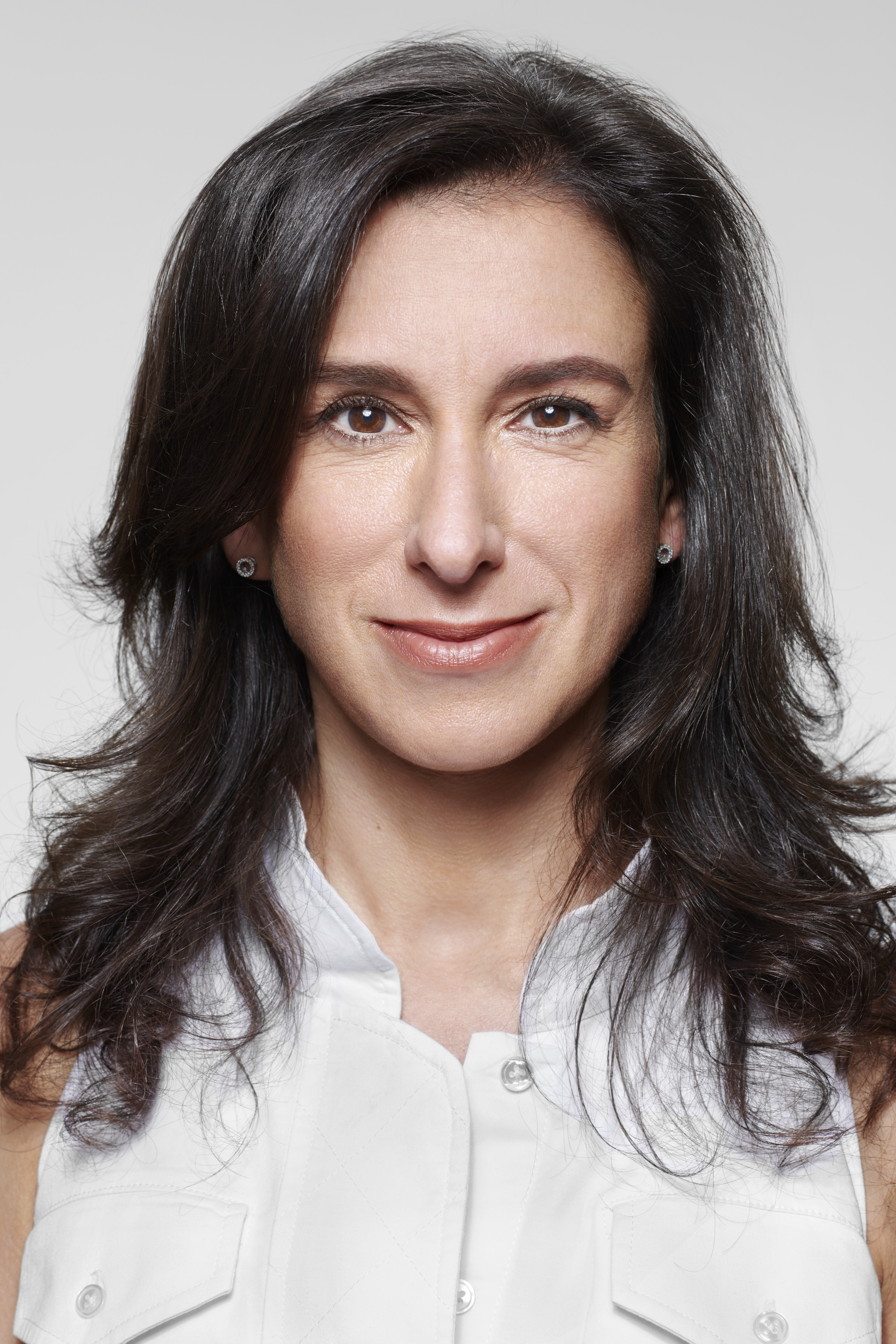
- Kantor in 2019
- Born: April 21, 1975 (age 51); New York City, New York, U.S.
- Education: Columbia University (BA); Harvard University
- Occupation: Journalist
- Organization(s): The New York Times; Slate
- Spouse: Ron Lieber
- Children: 2
- Awards: Pulitzer Prize (2018)
- Website: Official website

Jodi Kantor (born April 21, 1975) is an American journalist. She is a New York Times correspondent whose work has covered the workplace, technology, and gender. She has been the paper's Arts & Leisure editor and covered two presidential campaigns, chronicling the transformation of Barack and Michelle Obama into the President and First Lady of the United States. Kantor was a recipient of the Pulitzer Prize in 2018 for her reporting on sexual abuse by Harvey Weinstein.

Kantor is the author of the book The Obamas and She Said: Breaking the Sexual Harassment Story that Helped Ignite a Movement about the Harvey Weinstein investigation. She is a contributor to CBS This Morning and has also appeared on Charlie Rose, The Daily Show and The Today Show. Kantor was included in Time magazine's 100 Most Influential People of 2018.

== Early life and education ==
Born and raised in a Jewish family in New York City, Kantor moved to Holmdel Township, New Jersey, where she graduated from Holmdel High School. Kantor's grandparents were Holocaust survivors. In 1996, Kantor graduated magna cum laude from Columbia University with a degree in history. She participated in the Dorot Fellowship in Israel from 1996 to 1997, where she studied Hebrew and worked with Israeli-Palestinian organizations in East Jerusalem, and later worked for a year as an Urban Fellow in Rudy Giuliani's Mayor's Office of Operations. Later, Kantor attended Harvard Law School for one semester, taking a leave, to work in Washington, D.C., at Slate's office, where she later became the magazine's New York editor.

== The New York Times ==
After corresponding with New York Times columnist Frank Rich about how that paper could improve its arts coverage, she was brought on as editor of the Arts and Leisure section by Howell Raines at age 27. She is thought to be the youngest person to edit a section of the New York Times. Under the guidance of Rich and others, she made the section more visual, added new features and more reporting and recruited writers like Emily Nussbaum, Jesse Green and Manohla Dargis. In 2004 at the age of 28, she was named to Crain's New York Business "40 Under 40" list.

In 2007, Kantor turned to covering politics for the Times, including the 2008 presidential campaign and Barack Obama's biography. Starting in 2007, she wrote some of the earliest articles about Michelle Obama, the role of the Obama daughters in their father's career, the role of basketball in the president's life, his relationship with Rev. Jeremiah Wright and his career as a constitutional law professor. She broke the news of initial strain between Obama and Reverend Jeremiah Wright. In autumn of 2009, she co-authored the story of Michelle Obama's slave roots and authored a cover story in the New York Times magazine about the first marriage, for which she interviewed the president and first lady in the Oval Office. In the interview, she asked them "How can you have an equal marriage when one person is President?"

== The Obamas ==
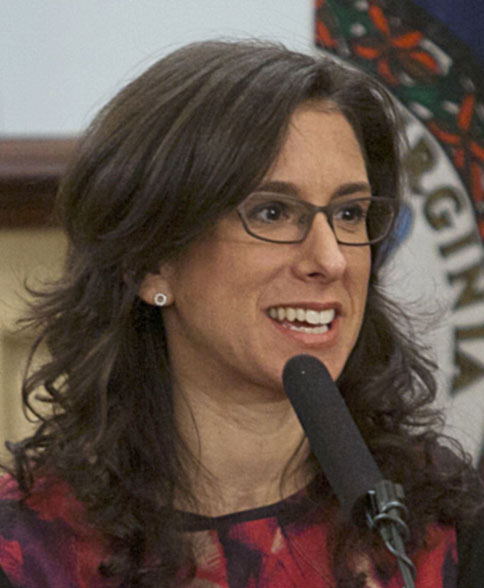
Kantor speaks at an event in 2012.

Kantor's book, The Obamas, published in 2012, chronicled the first couple's adjustment to the new world of the White House, revealing Michelle Obama's initial struggle and eventual turnaround in her role. Shortly after the book's publication, Michelle Obama said in a television interview that she was tired of being portrayed as an "angry black woman." However, she also stated that she had not read Kantor's book, and a diverse array of figures, including David Brooks, Jon Stewart, Farai Chideya, and Glenn Loury responded by calling Kantor's portrayal of Michelle Obama well-rounded and respectful. White House officials initially distanced themselves from the book, but then reversed their tack after journalists called the book "deeply reported and nuanced" and "largely sympathetic."

In The New York Times, Connie Schultz praised The Obamas. "A meticulous reporter, Ms. Kantor is attuned to the nuance of small gestures, the import of unspoken truths," Schultz wrote. "She knows that every strong marriage, including the one now in the White House, has its complexities and its disappointments. Ms. Kantor also — and this is a key — has a high regard for women, which is why hers is the first book about the Obama presidency to give Michelle Obama her due. In the process we learn a great deal about the talented and introverted loner who married her, and how his wife has influenced him as a president." Other reviewers called the book "insightful and evocative, rich with detail" and "an honest portrayal of people who are put under unprecedented scrutiny with unusual rapidity." Ezra Klein, of The Washington Post, called The Obamas "among the very best books on this White House" and "a serious, thoughtful book on the modern presidency."

== Investigative and long-form reporting ==
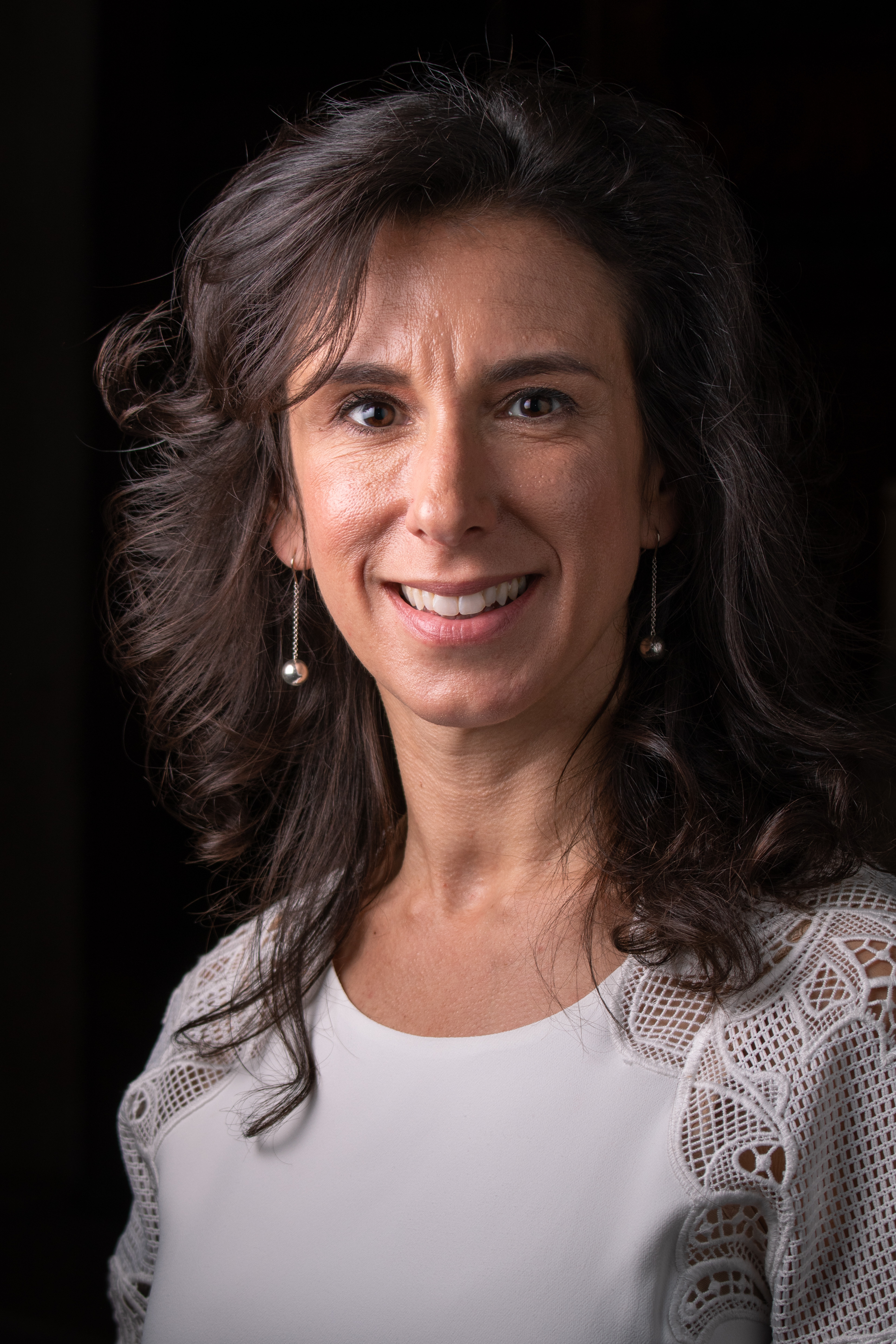
Kantor in 2018, at the Pulitzer Prizes

Kantor's 2006 story, "On the Job, Nursing Mothers Find a 2-Class System", on the class gap in breastfeeding inspired the creation of the first free-standing lactation stations, now installed in hundreds of airports, stadiums and other workplaces around the United States.

She has reported on the treatment of women on Wall Street and in the Church of Jesus Christ of Latter-day Saints (LDS Church). Her story on Harvard Business School's attempts to improve its treatment of women led to a discussion of gender at business schools (as well as class and money issues.) After it was published, the dean of Harvard Business School, Nitin Nohria, apologized to all female alumnae for the negative experiences many of them had at Harvard and pledged to boost the number of case studies with female protagonists.

Kantor has explored how technology is changing the workplace. In August 2014, Kantor's article "Working Anything but 9 to 5," about a Starbucks barista and single mother struggling to keep up with a work schedule set by automated software, spurred the coffee chain to revise scheduling policies for 130,000 workers across the United States.

In the summer of 2015, Kantor and David Streitfeld published "Inside Amazon", a 6,000 word article about the company's methods of managing white-collar employees. The article drew a response from Jeff Bezos, broke the newspaper's all-time record for reader comments, prompted veterans of the secretive company to come forward about their experiences online, and sparked a national debate about fairness and productivity in the technological workplace.

In 2016, Kantor co-authored "Refugees Welcome", spending 15 months chronicling how everyday Canadian citizens adopted tens of thousands of Syrian refugees. The series won praise from Canadian Prime Minister Justin Trudeau, who called it "remarkable & very human."

On October 5, 2017, Kantor and Megan Twohey broke the story of three decades of allegations of sexual harassment and abuse by the film producer Harvey Weinstein. Their investigation documented numerous accusations, including from the actress Ashley Judd, internal records and memos showing that Weinstein had harassed generations of his own employees, and settlements (including non-disclosure agreements) dating back to 1990 that covered up Weinstein's trail of abuse. Weinstein was subsequently fired by the board of his production company, The Weinstein Company, and his membership of the Academy of Motion Picture Arts and Sciences was revoked in October 2017. Women around the world began coming forward with accusations of sexual harassment and assault by Weinstein, sending shock waves through the entertainment industry. The discussion soon turned into a worldwide reckoning, spread beyond the entertainment world, with women using the social media hashtag #metoo (initially started by the American activist Tarana Burke) to describe their common experiences, powerful men brought to account in a wide range of fields, and shifting attitudes and policies around the globe. Speaking on Meet the Press, Rich Lowry, the editor of the National Review, called Kantor and Twohey's Weinstein investigation "the single most influential piece of journalism I can remember. It instantly changed this country."

== She Said ==
In September 2019, Penguin Press published She Said, Kantor and Twohey's book about the Harvey Weinstein investigation. The Washington Post called it "an instant classic of investigative journalism." Writing for The New York Times, Susan Faludi said, "Watching Kantor and Twohey pursue their goal while guarding each other’s back is as exhilarating as watching Megan Rapinoe and Crystal Dunn on the pitch." A film adaptation was released in November 2022 with Zoe Kazan playing Kantor. Megan Twohey is played by Carey Mulligan.

== Awards ==
Kantor is the recipient of awards from PEN America, the Feminist Press and the Los Angeles Press Club. She was selected by Crain's Magazine as one of "Forty Under Forty" promising New Yorkers, by the Hollywood Reporter as one of the most powerful women in entertainment, by ReCode as one of the most influential people in media or technology in 2017, and by Time magazine as one of the 100 most influential people of that year.

In 2018, Kantor received the George Polk Award, the McGill Medal for Journalistic Courage from the Grady College of Journalism. The New York Times won the 2018 Pulitzer Prize for Public Service for Kantor's and Meghan Twohey's reporting, sharing the award with Ronan Farrow at The New Yorker. She was one of three people from her Columbia class to have won a Pulitzer Prize, alongside journalist Harriet Ryan and composer Tom Kitt. In 2019, Kantor received a John Jay Award from her alma mater, Columbia College.

== Works ==
- Kantor, Jodi (2012). The Obamas. Little, Brown and Company. ISBN 978-0316098755.
- Kantor, Jodi; Twohey, Megan (2019). She Said: Breaking the Sexual Harassment Story That Helped Ignite a Movement. Penguin. ISBN 978-0525560340.
- Kantor, Jodi; Twohey, Megan (November 16, 2021). Chasing the Truth: A Young Journalist's Guide to Investigative Reporting: She Said Young Readers Edition. Penguin. ISBN 978-0-593-32701-2.
- Kantor, Jodi (2026). How to Start: Discovering Your Life's Work. Little, Brown and Company. ISBN 978-0316609555.

== Personal life ==
Kantor is married to Ron Lieber, the "Your Money" columnist for The New York Times and author of The Opposite of Spoiled. They have two daughters and live in Brooklyn, New York. Kantor is a member of a Reform synagogue in Brooklyn.

== See also ==
- New Yorkers in journalism
