= She Said (book) =

2019 non-fiction book by Jodi Kantor and Megan Twohey

She Said: Breaking the Sexual Harassment Story That Helped Ignite a Movement
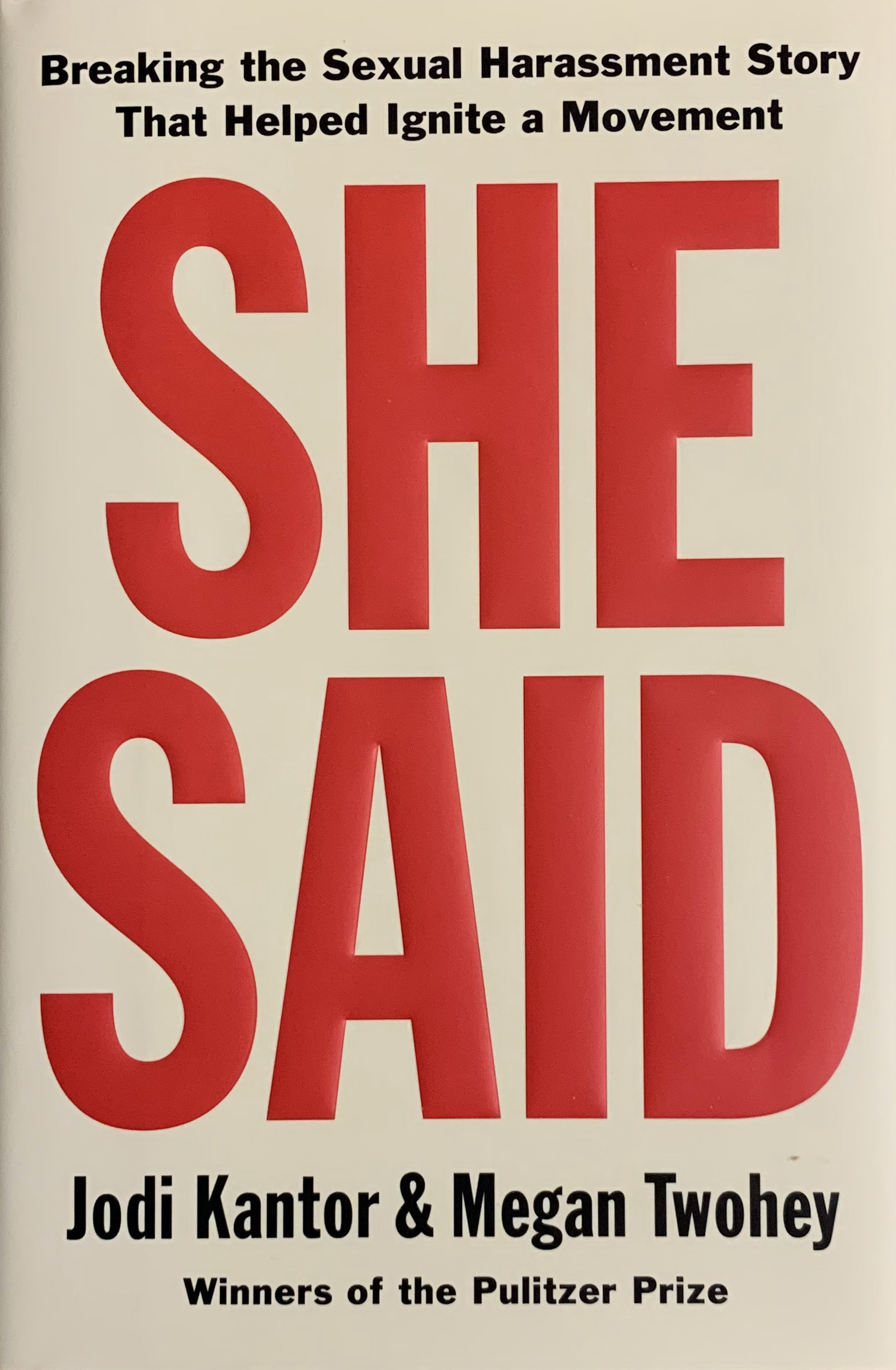
- Author: Jodi Kantor; Megan Twohey
- Language: English
- Subject: Sexual harassment; Sexual abuse
- Genre: Nonfiction, investigative journalism
- Publisher: Penguin Press
- Publication date: September 10, 2019
- Publication place: United States
- Media type: Print, E-book
- Pages: 320
- ISBN: 9780525560340
- Website: Publisher's website for book

She Said: Breaking the Sexual Harassment Story That Helped Ignite a Movement is a 2019 nonfiction book written by Jodi Kantor and Megan Twohey, two New York Times investigative reporters who exposed Harvey Weinstein's history of abuse and sexual misconduct against women, a catalyst for the burgeoning MeToo movement. The book was published on September 10, 2019 by Penguin Press.

== Methodology ==
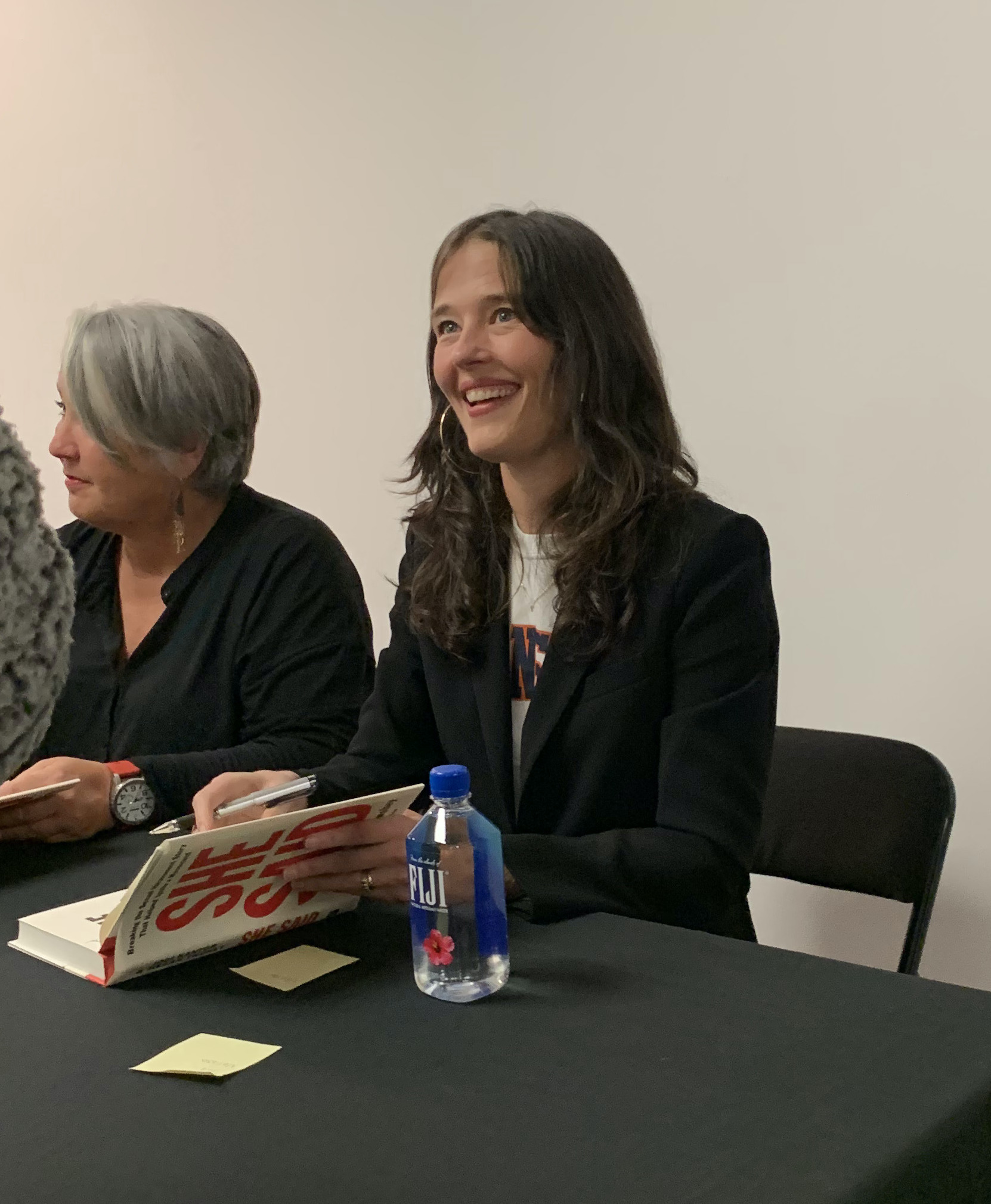
Megan Twohey's book signing at Evanston Township High School

The book details the behind-the-scenes and publicly known processes the authors employed to investigate and publish stories uncovering sexual harassment and sexual abuse by high-profile and powerful men including Harvey Weinstein. The book details new information that helped break the Weinstein story, including sources, documents, and chasing leads. It follows the reporters "from the first exploratory phone calls, to a mounting trail of evidence, to a final face off with a [well known] belligerent" accused person. The book also deals with the open questions about which behaviors and gray areas should constitute sexual harassment:

Kantor admitted that there is "a mounting sense of unfairness on both sides" about a system that no one thinks "works for the accuser, or the accused." Their job remains, as Kantor put it, to ask the three main questions surrounding any allegation: "What is the scope of the behaviors under scrutiny?;" "How do we get the facts right?;" and "What should punishment and accountability look like?"

The authors continue to investigate these questions. To help persuade sources to talk to them, the sources were told that what happened in the past cannot be changed but "together we may be able to use your experience to help protect other people."

Gwyneth Paltrow was instrumental in helping the reporter-authors behind the scenes and whose efforts are chronicled in the book. Near the end of the book, the authors discuss Christine Blasey Ford and the choices that led her to publicly confront Brett Kavanaugh, then a Supreme Court nominee.

== Circle of influence ==
The book chronicles the intersection of executives, companies, lawyers, gossip columnists, tabloid publishers, talent agents, entertainment companies, and public relations (PR) companies that became enmeshed in Weinstein's circle of influence which served to hide and bury information about his behaviors, but was an open secret. Quid pro quo took the form of agreeing to buy film rights to books and stories for "high-grossing films", and promising on-screen roles.

The focus is on the systemic "structures of power" that enabled Weinstein for decades. The reporting, which followed "whispers and rumors" occurring over 30 years, was supported by large numbers of interviews with actresses, past and present employees, filings in court, corporate records, and "internal company communications that documented a thick web of cover-ups, bullying tactics and confidential settlements."

== Reviews ==
In her review for The New York Times, Susan Faludi, wrote, "Kantor and Twohey have crafted their news dispatches into a seamless and suspenseful account of their reportorial journey, a gripping blow-by-blow of how they managed, 'working in the blank spaces between the words,' to corroborate allegations that had been chased and abandoned by multiple journalists before them. She Said reads a bit like a feminist All the President’s Men.” The Times noted that, "This book was one of our most anticipated titles of September".

- McNamara, Mary (September 12, 2019). "'She Said' is more important than 'All the President's Men.' There, I said it". Los Angeles Times.
- Liquori, Donna (September 17, 2019). "Old-fashioned reporting most compelling aspect of 'She Said'". AP NEWS.
- Horton, Adrian (September 11, 2019). "She Said: an inside look at the story that brought down Harvey Weinstein". The Guardian.
- Lewis, Helen (September 18, 2019). "'She Said' by Jodi Kantor and Megan Twohey review – the inside story of Weinstein and #MeToo". the Guardian.
- Tett, Gillian (September 12, 2019). "She Said — a moving account of how the Weinstein story broke". Financial Times. Archived from the original on September 25, 2022.
- Garber, Megan (September 9, 2019). "The Plan to Make Harvey Weinstein a Hero". The Atlantic.
- "She Said: Breaking the Sexual Harassment Story that Helped Ignite a Movement by Jodi Kantor, Megan Twohey". publishersweekly.com. September 2019.
- Kati, Rebekah (November 8, 2019). "Reviewed: She Said". Library Journal.
- Klein, Julia M. (September 11, 2019). "How They Brought Down Harvey Weinstein". The Forward.
- Farris, Mike (October 1, 2019). "book review : She Said". New York Journal of Books.
- Kamine, Mark (January 3, 2020). "Publish and be damning". The Times Literary Supplement. Archived from the original on August 17, 2022.
- Kelley, Kitty (October 31, 2019). "She Said: Breaking the Sexual Harassment Story that Helped Ignite a Movement". Washington Independent Review of Books.
- Kornbluth, Jesse (October 25, 2019). "Review: She Said". bookreporter. Archived from the original on January 18, 2023.

== Film ==
A film adaptation of the book directed by Maria Schrader was released on November 18, 2022. The film is a co-production by Plan B Entertainment, Annapurna Pictures and Universal Pictures. It stars Zoe Kazan, Carey Mulligan, Patricia Clarkson, Andre Braugher, Samantha Morton, Tom Pelphrey, and Adam Shapiro.
