= Megan Twohey =

American journalist

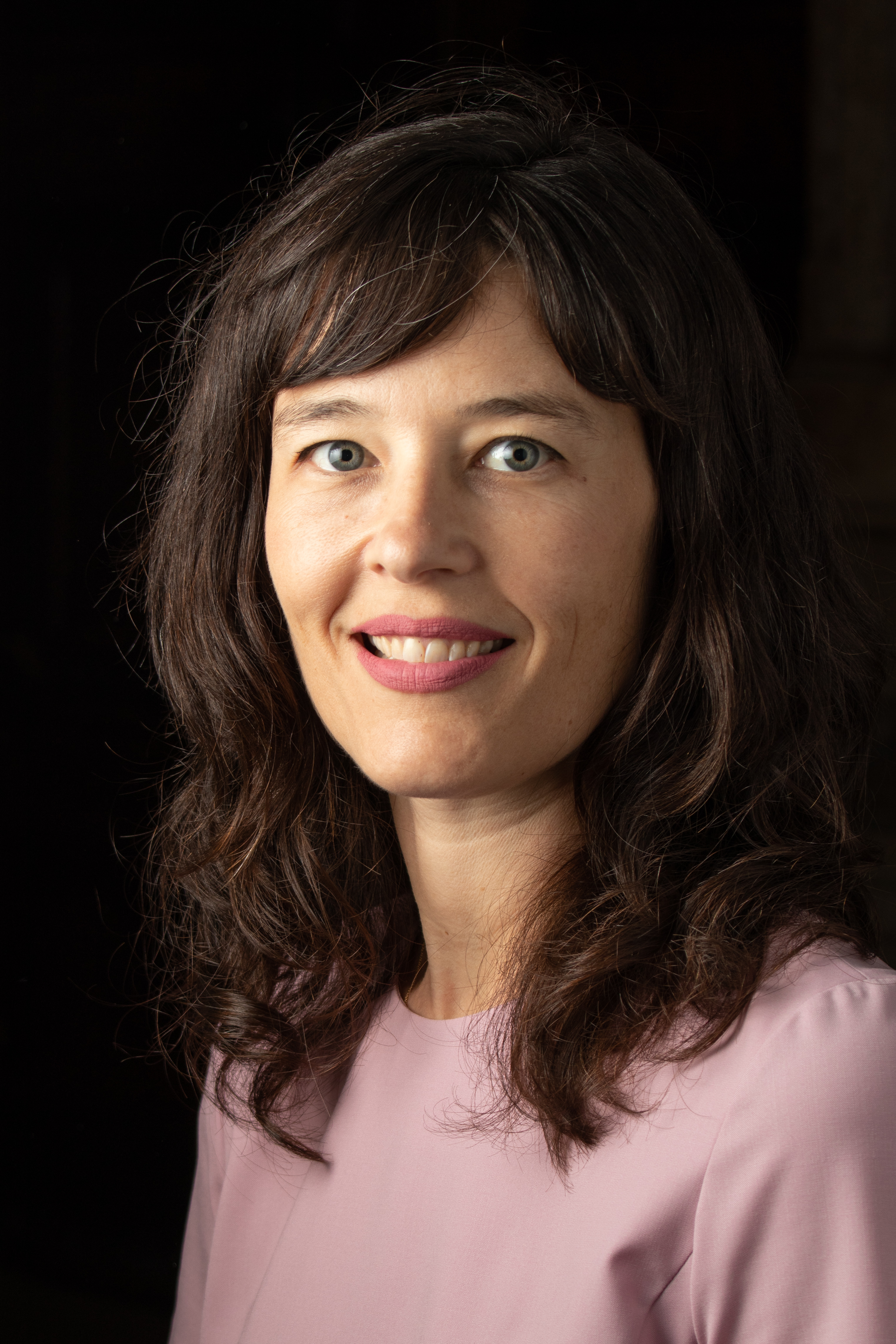
- Twohey at the 2018 Pulitzer Prizes
- Born: Washington, D.C.
- Education: Georgetown University
- Occupation: Journalist
- Awards: 2018 Pulitzer Prize for Public Service (named contributor)

Megan Twohey (/ˈtuːi/ TOO-ee) is an American journalist. She is an investigative reporter at The New York Times and previously reported for Reuters, the Chicago Tribune, and the Milwaukee Journal Sentinel.

On October 5, 2017, Twohey and fellow Times journalist Jodi Kantor published a report about Harvey Weinstein detailing decades of sexual abuse allegations, and more than 80 women publicly accused Weinstein of sexually abusing or assaulting them. The story led to Weinstein's firing and helped to ignite the viral #MeToo movement started by the American activist Tarana Burke. That work was honored in 2018, when The New York Times was awarded the 2018 Pulitzer Prize for Public Service. Kantor and Twohey won the George Polk award and were named to Time magazine's list of 100 most influential people of the year. Twohey and Kantor subsequently authored a 2019 book, She Said, which chronicled their report about Weinstein and was adapted into a film of the same name in 2022. In addition to winning the 2018 Pulitzer Prize for Public Service, Twohey was a finalist for the Pulitzer Prize for Investigative Reporting in 2014.

== Early life and education ==
Twohey was born in Washington, D.C. and raised in Evanston, Illinois. Twohey's parents were both involved in news media; her mother Mary Jane Twohey was a television news producer and her father John Twohey was an editor for the Chicago Tribune.

Her father John Twohey is a journalist, who was Chicago Times magazine editorial director in 1989. He joined the Chicago Tribune in 1977, after serving for five years as design director of The Washington Post. Earlier in his career, he served as press secretary for Sargent Shriver's 1972 Democratic vice presidential run and for Senator Fred R. Harris (D-Okla.). Megan's mother Mary Jane Twohey worked as a Congressional aide and as a news producer at WETA-TV in Washington, D.C. before serving for many years as a spokesperson and media-relations manager for Northwestern University in Evanston, Illinois.

She went to Evanston Township High School, then attended Georgetown University, graduating in 1998 with a Bachelor's degree in American studies. While in college, she interned at the ABC News production Nightline.

== Career and investigations ==
After graduating from Georgetown, Twohey wrote for Washington Monthly and the National Journal before spending a year in Moscow as a reporter for The Moscow Times. In 2002, she became a general assignment reporter for the Milwaukee Journal Sentinel, then began writing investigations at the Chicago Tribune. She reported for Reuters before joining The New York Times in 2016, first focusing on Donald Trump's tax history, possible business ties to Russia, and his past treatment of women.

=== Untested rape kits ===
In 2009, Twohey reported in the Chicago Tribune that several suburban police departments around Chicago were not submitting all rape kits for testing. In the following year, Illinois became the first U.S. state to require every rape kit be tested, and many other states in the U.S. followed soon after.

=== Predatory doctors ===
From 2010 to 2011, Twohey published a series of articles in the Chicago Tribune detailing cases of doctors who had been convicted of violent felonies or sex crimes and were still practicing and abusing patients. Her reporting has been credited for leading to new legislation and policies in Illinois aimed at protecting patients, for example requiring background checks for healthcare providers.

=== Abandoned children ===
In 2013, Twohey published an investigative report in Reuters News that detailed how some people in the United States were using the internet to find places to abandon their adopted children. Several segments of this story were broadcast on the Nightly News and the Today Show on NBC. She received a Sydney Award and the Michael Kelly Award for her work revealing these underground networks. Twohey was a finalist for the Pulitzer Prize for this work.

=== Donald Trump ===
In 2016, Twohey and Michael Barbaro published several investigative pieces to The New York Times about sexual misconduct by then-presidential candidate Donald Trump. She continued to report on the incidents into 2017. Trump threatened to sue The New York Times if they did not take down the articles.

=== Weinstein sexual abuse ===
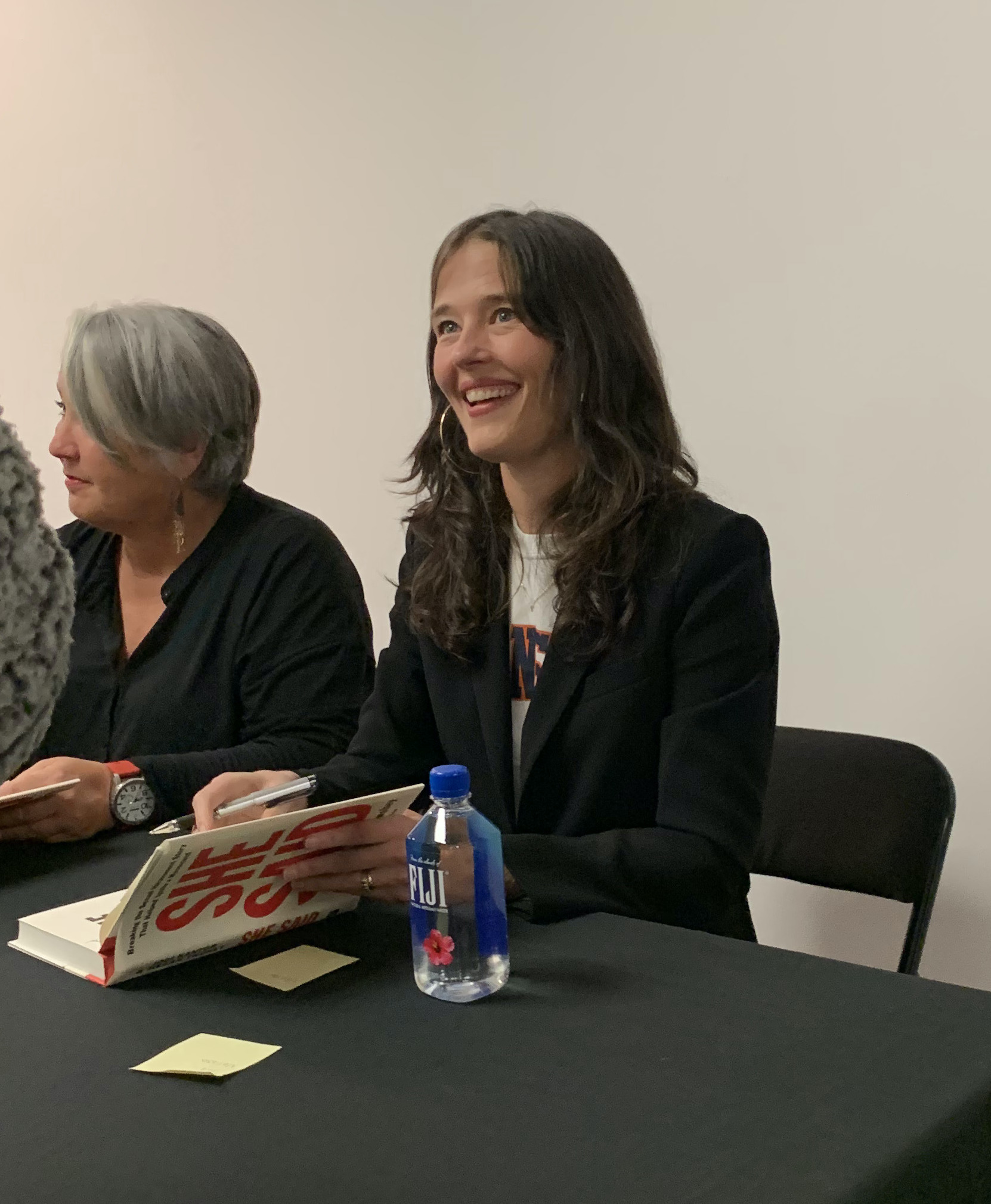
Book signing at Evanston Township High School

On October 5, 2017, Twohey and Jodi Kantor co-wrote a New York Times exposé on sexual misconduct by Harvey Weinstein. Twohey said they were encouraged to investigate untold stories, and that Dean Baquet, executive editor, and Rebecca Corbett, head of investigative projects, had supported them even though Weinstein had threatened to sue The New York Times. Twohey and Kantor had two in-person meetings with Weinstein. Twohey, Kantor, and Corbett also had multiple conversations with Weinstein's lawyers and publicists. A follow-up piece with fellow reporter Ellen Gabler added more allegations and expanded the Weinstein timeline. Twohey said it was an emotional experience when she began seeing friends and family using the #MeToo on her social media feed in the aftermath of the Weinstein allegations. Jezebel announced in 2018 Twohey and Kantor were publishing an international book, set to be published in Spring 2019, based on their investigation that would reveal more about what happened. They received a Sidney Award for their exposé. They were also given L.A. Press Club's Inaugural Impact Award and the McGill Medal for Journalistic Courage from the Grady College of Journalism. The New York Times won the 2018 Pulitzer Prize for Public Service for Twohey's and Jodi Kantor's reporting, sharing the award with Ronan Farrow at The New Yorker, as well as the 2018 Gerald Loeb Award for Investigative business journalism.

==== She Said ====
Twohey and Kantor authored a book which chronicled their exposé into Weinstein and the structures of power that enabled him, titled She Said: Breaking the Sexual Harassment Story that Helped Ignite a Movement, which was published by Penguin Books in September 2019. In 2022, the book was adapted into a film of the same name. The film is directed by Maria Schrader from a screenplay by Rebecca Lenkiewicz. Twohey is played by Carey Mulligan.

=== Suicide forum investigation ===
In December 2021, Twohey and Gabriel Dance published an investigative report in The New York Times about an American web forum dedicated to discussing and encouraging suicide. The report identified the founders of the suicide forum as Lamarcus Small and Diego Joaquín Galante and confirmed the deaths of 45 participants of the forum. As part of the report, Twohey and Dance consulted established reporters and suicide and medical experts, to find ways to limit the potential for suicide contagion. Twohey stated that the overall lack of awareness over the site pushed them to name it in their report, but that the decision was among the "biggest ethical issues that we had ever dealt with", and also stated that the hope of the report was “to bring about more accountability than anything else.” Twohey's report was later cited in a letter from members of the U.S. House of Representatives to Attorney General Merrick Garland asking the attorney general what action could be taken against the site.

=== Transgender healthcare ===
In November 2022, The New York Times published a piece co-written by Twohey criticizing the prescription of puberty blockers for transgender minors. Dr. AJ Eckert (director of the gender-affirming care program for Anchor Health in Connecticut and a teacher at Quinnipiac University's School of Medicine) called the Times' piece "another hit piece against trans people". Eckert also wrote an article published by Science-Based Medicine, in which he said "the reporting ignored evidence and important context to weave a narrative portraying puberty blockers as far more risky than they actually are". In an op-ed published by Teen Vogue, the chief medical officer of the Los Angeles LGBT Center said the New York Times' authors "[failed] to meaningfully investigate the most compelling reason why medical providers consider puberty blockers in trans and gender diverse youth: These medications save lives."

A statement issued by the executive committee of the World Professional Association for Transgender Health and the board of its U.S. affiliate said the reporting "furthers the atmosphere of misinformation and subjectivity that has grown to surround the area of gender affirming medical interventions for transgender youth", and accused the authors of "[coming] up short in their interpretation and application of available data". On social media, lawyer and transgender rights activist Chase Strangio of the ACLU pointed to the piece as an example of how "rhetoric found in major news outlets fuels anti-trans violence", according to the geek culture website The Mary Sue. A writer for Slate magazine said the New York Times piece "does not seem to trust [the] medical consensus view". Fox News said the report "sparked jeers from critics on social media mocking their newfound nuanced coverage of puberty blockers" and was "also blasted by progressives".

=== Blake Lively article ===
In December 2024, The New York Times published an article by Twohey and two other journalists titled "We Can Bury Anyone: Inside a Hollywood Smear Machine" detailing claims by actress Blake Lively that It Ends with Us director and co-star Justin Baldoni had employed a public relations team to smear her reputation, allegations that would lead to a court battle between Lively and Baldoni over the film. Baldoni and 10 associated parties mentioned in the article denied the allegations and sued The New York Times for libel. In June 2025, the court dismissed the lawsuit against the newspaper, citing legal protections for its reporting. The legal fight between Baldoni and Lively that stemmed from Lively's original complaint continued in court, where a judge dismissed the majority of Lively’s claims in April 2026. In May 2026, Lively voluntarily withdrew her remaining claims, ending the litigation in a settlement.

== Personal life ==
Twohey's husband, Jim Rutman, is a literary agent.
