= List of Canadian films of 2007 =

This is a list of Canadian films which were released in 2007:

Title	Director	Cast	Genre	Notes
The 3 L'il Pigs (Les 3 p'tits cochons)	Patrick Huard	Claude Legault, Guillaume Lemay-Thivierge, Paul Doucet	Comedy	Golden Reel Award
All Hat	Leonard Farlinger	Luke Kirby, Stephen McHattie, Keith Carradine	Western-comedy	
Amal	Richie Mehta	Rupindar Nagra, Koel Purie, Naseeruddin Shah, Seema Biswas, Vik Sahay	Drama	Genie Award – Song
American Venus	Bruce Sweeney	Rebecca De Mornay, Jane McGregor, Matt Craven	Drama	
Anna's Storm	Kristoffer Tabori	Sheree J. Wilson	Action, Drama	
The Answer Key	Samir Rehem	Joe Pingue, Robin Brûlé, Earl Pastko	Short drama	
Antlers (Panache)	André-Line Beauparlant		Documentary	
Bluff	Simon Olivier Fecteau & Marc-André Lavoie	Rémy Girard, Isabelle Blais	Comedy	
The Bodybuilder and I	Bryan Friedman		Documentary produced with the National Film Board	Best Canadian Feature Documentary at Hot Docs
Breakfast with Scot	Laurie Lynd	Tom Cavanagh, Ben Shenkman, Noah Bernett, Benz Antoine	Comedy	
Butterfly on a Wheel	Mike Barker	Pierce Brosnan, Maria Bello, Gerard Butler	Thriller	
Can You Wave Bye-Bye?	Sarah Galea-Davis	Miranda Handford	Short drama	
La Capture	Carole Laure	Catherine De Léan, Laurent Lucas, Pascale Bussières	Drama	Canada-France co-production
Closing the Ring	Richard Attenborough	Shirley MacLaine, Christopher Plummer, Pete Postlethwaite, Brenda Fricker, Neve Campbell	WWII drama	Canada-U.K. co-production made with U.S. financing
Code 13	Mathieu Denis	Roc Lafortune, Vincent-Guillaume Otis	Short drama	
The Colony	Jeff Barnaby	Glen Gould, Kaniehtiio Horn	Short drama	
Continental, a Film Without Guns (Continental, un film sans fusil)	Stéphane Lafleur	Marie-Ginette Guay, Gilbert Sicotte, Réal Bossé, Fanny Mallette	Comedy-drama	TIFF – Best Canadian First Feature
Days of Darkness (L'Âge des ténèbres)	Denys Arcand	Marc Labrèche, Diane Kruger, Sylvie Léonard	Comedy/Drama	Prix Jutra – Makeup
Decoys 2	Jeffery Scott Lando	Kim Poirier	Sci-fi, Horror	Direct to DVD
The Descendant	Philippe Spurrell	Tadhg MacMahon, Jim Reid, Ilona Garcen	Drama	
Dust Bowl Ha! Ha!	Sébastien Pilote	André Bouchard, Gérald Pilote, Jean Wauthier	Short drama	
Eastern Promises	David Cronenberg	Viggo Mortensen, Naomi Watts, Vincent Cassel, Armin Mueller-Stahl	Crime drama	TIFF – People's Choice Award; Canada-U.K. co-production made with U.S. financing
Emotional Arithmetic	Paolo Barzman	Gabriel Byrne, Roy Dupuis, Susan Sarandon, Christopher Plummer, Max von Sydow	Drama	Based on the novel by Matt Cohen
The End	Jeremy Thomas	Jeremy Thomas, Ella B. May	Dark comedy-horror	Best SciFi/Horror, Eugene Film Festival
Farmer's Requiem	Ramses Madina		Short documentary	
Finn's Girl	Dominique Cardona, Laurie Colbert	Brooke Johnson, Maya Ritter, Yanna McIntosh, Richard Clarkin	Drama film	
Fugitive Pieces	Jeremy Podeswa	Stephen Dillane, Rade Sherbedgia, Rosamund Pike	Drama	Based on the novel by Anne Michaels; Canada-Greece co-production
Gene Boy Came Home	Alanis Obomsawin	Eugene "Gene Boy" Benedict	National Film Board Documentary	
The Great Resistance (Au pays des colons)	Denys Desjardins		National Film Board Documentary	
I Met the Walrus	Josh Raskin	voice of John Lennon	Short	
The Invisible Nation (Le Peuple invisible)	Richard Desjardins, Robert Monderie		Documentary	Prix Jutra – Documentary
Jack Brooks: Monster Slayer	Jon Knautz	Robert Englund, Trevor Matthews, Rachel Skarsten	Horror	
Just Buried	Chaz Thorne	Jay Baruchel, Rose Byrne, Graham Greene, Jeremy Akerman	Black comedy	
Late Fragment	Daryl Cloran, Anita Doron, Mateo Guez	Michael Healey, Jeffrey Parazzo	Interactive cinema	First North American interactive feature film
The Mad	John Kalangis	Billy Zane, Maggie Castle	Horror comedy	
Madame Tutli-Putli	Chris Lavis & Maciek Szczerbowski		National Film Board Stop motion animated short	Cannes prize winner; Academy Award nomination – Animated Short
Mona's Daughters (Le Cèdre penché)	Rafaël Ouellet	Viviane Audet, Marie-Neige Chatelin	Drama	
Mr. Magorium's Wonder Emporium	Zach Helm	Dustin Hoffman, Natalie Portman, Jason Bateman, Zach Mills	Family, comedy	U.K.-France-German-Canada co-production
My Aunt Aline (Ma tante Aline)	Gabriel Pelletier	Sylvie Léonard, Béatrice Picard, Marc Messier	Comedy, drama	
My Daughter, My Angel (Ma fille mon ange)	Alexis Durand-Brault	Michel Côté, Karine Vanasse	Thriller	
My Winnipeg	Guy Maddin	Darcy Fehr, Ann Savage	Drama	TIFF – Best Canadian Feature; TFCA – Best Canadian Film
Nikamowin (Song)	Kevin Lee Burton		Experimental documentary short	
Nitro	Alain DesRochers	Guillaume Lemay-Thivierge, Lucie Laurier	Crime, action	Prix Jutra – Editing
The Other Side of the Country (De l'autre côté du pays)	Catherine Hébert		Documentary	
Our Private Lives (Nos vies privées)	Denis Côté		Drama	
Partition	Vic Sarin	Jimi Mistry, Kristin Kreuk, Neve Campbell, John Light, Irrfan Kahn	Historical drama	Canada-U.K.-South Africa co-production
A Place Between: The Story of an Adoption	Curtis Kaltenbaugh		Documentary	
Pool	Chris Chong Chan Fui		Short	Malaysian co-production
Poor Boy's Game	Clement Virgo	Rossif Sutherland, Flex Alexander, Danny Glover, Greg Bryk, Laura Regan	Boxing drama	
A Promise to the Dead: The Exile Journey of Ariel Dorfman	Peter Raymont	Ariel Dorfman	Documentary	
The Ring (Le Ring)	Anaïs Barbeau-Lavalette	Maxime Desjardins-Tremblay, Stéphane Demers, Julianne Côté	Drama	
River	Mark Wihak	Maya Batten-Young, Adam Budd	Drama	
The Schoolyard (Les Grands)	Chloé Leriche	Antoine Marcotte, Jean-Carl Boucher, Robert Naylor	Short drama	
Shake Hands with the Devil	Roger Spottiswoode	Roy Dupuis, James Gallanders, Michel Mongeau, Deborah Kara Unger	Drama about the Rwanda genocide	Genie Award – Song; Prix Jutra – Actor (Dupuis); see also 2004 documentary
Sharkwater	Rob Stewart		Documentary	
She's a Boy I Knew	Gwen Haworth		Documentary	
Silk	François Girard	Michael Pitt, Keira Knightley, Alfred Molina, Miki Nakatani, Kōji Yakusho, Callum Keith Rennie	Historical drama	Based on the novel by Alessandro Baricco; Canada-U.K.-France-Italy-Japan co-production
Sleeping Betty (Isabelle au bois dormant)	Claude Cloutier		National Film Board animated short based on the Sleeping Beauty tale	Genie Award – Animated Short; Prix Jutra – Animated Short
The Stone Angel	Kari Skogland	Ellen Burstyn, Christine Horne, Cole Hauser, Elliot Page, Kevin Zegers, Dylan Baker, Luke Kirby	Drama based on the novel by Margaret Laurence	Canada-U.K. co-production; Genie Award – Actress (Burstyn), Musical Score
Summit Circle (Contre toute espérance)	Bernard Émond	Guylaine Tremblay, Guy Jodoin, Gildor Roy, René-Daniel Dubois	Drama	Prix Jutra – Actress (Tremblay)
Surviving My Mother (Comment survivre à sa mère)	Émile Gaudreault	Caroline Dhavernas, Ellen David, Véronique Le Flaguais, Colin Mochrie	Family drama, comedy	
Taking the Plunge (À vos marques... party!)	Frédéric D'Amours		Comedy	
Terminus	Trevor Cawood		Short comedy	
That Beautiful Somewhere	Robert Budreau	Roy Dupuis, Jane McGregor, Gordon Tootoosis, David Fox	Crime melodrama	
They Wait	Ernie Barbarash	Jaime King, Terry Chen, Pei-pei Cheng, Regan Oey, Henry O	Horror	
Things We Lost in the Fire	Susanne Bier	Halle Berry, Benicio del Toro, David Duchovny, Alison Lohman, Omar Benson Miller, John Carroll Lynch	Drama	
This Beautiful City	Ed Gass-Donnelly	Aaron Poole, Kristin Booth, Caroline Cave	Drama	
Tkaronto	Shane Belcourt	Duane Murray, Melanie McLaren, Lorne Cardinal	Drama	
The Tracey Fragments	Bruce McDonald	Elliot Page, Zie Souwand, Slim Twig, Max Turnbull, Julian Richings	Drama	Script and novel by Maureen Medved
Twilight (La Brunante)	Fernand Dansereau	Monique Mercure, Suzanne Clément	Drama about Alzheimer's disease	
Walk All over Me	Robert Cuffley	Leelee Sobieski, Tricia Helfer, Lothaire Bluteau, Jacob Tierney	Drama	
Weirdsville	Allan Moyle	Scott Speedman, Wes Bentley, Taryn Manning, Raoul Bhaneja	Comedy, action	
You (Toi)	François Delisle	Anne-Marie Cadieux, Laurent Lucas, Marc Béland	Drama	
Young People Fucking	Martin Gero	Aaron Abrams, Kristin Booth, Ennis Esmer, Carly Pope	Sexual, Romantic comedy	Genie Award – Supporting Actress (Booth)

== See also ==
- 2007 in Canada
- 2007 in Canadian television
