= 2007 Toronto International Film Festival =

32nd annual film festival held in Toronto, Canada

Toronto International Film Festival
- Festival poster
- Opening film: Fugitive Pieces
- Closing film: Emotional Arithmetic
- Location: Toronto, Ontario, Canada
- Hosted by: Toronto International Film Festival Group
- No. of films: 349
- Festival date: September 6, 2007 – September 15, 2007
- Language: International
- Website: http://www.torontointernationalfilmfestival.ca/
- 2008 2006

The 2007 Toronto International Film Festival, the 32nd annual edition of the Toronto International Film Festival, was held in Toronto, Ontario, Canada, from September 6, 2007, to September 15, 2007.

The lineup consisted of 349 films from 55 countries, selected from 4,156 submissions. The selection included 275 mid- to feature-length films, of which 234 were premieres, with 71 by first-time directors.

The festival opened with the world premiere of Jeremy Podeswa's Fugitive Pieces, a film based on the international bestselling novel by Anne Michaels, and closed with Paolo Barzman's Emotional Arithmetic, marking the first time in the festival's history that the opening and closing slots were both held by Canadian films in the same year.

== Film reception ==
Critical favourites included No Country for Old Men, The Diving Bell and the Butterfly and 4 Months, 3 Weeks and 2 Days which were equally well received at the Cannes Film Festival, plus the Joy Division biopic Control which, along with the eponymously titled documentary on the band, Joy Division, was picked up by The Weinstein Company. Peter Howell of the Toronto Star named Sidney Lumet's Before the Devil Knows You're Dead a major Oscar contender. The audience favourite, David Cronenberg's Eastern Promises, won the top prize at the festival. The New York Times pointed out that two previous winners had gone on to win Best Picture Oscars.

Highly discussed but divisive films among the public and critics include comedies Juno and Margot at the Wedding, the Bob Dylan biopic I'm Not There and Brian De Palma's Iraq War documentary Redacted. Films expected to stir controversy for their transgressive sexual content, such as Ang Lee's Lust, Caution, Alan Ball's Nothing Is Private and Martin Gero's Young People Fucking, did divide audiences but without fanfare. The Assassination of Jesse James by the Coward Robert Ford and Across the Universe both won their share of supporters despite previous reports of shooting delays and director-studio clashes.

== Awards ==
Award	Film	Director	Ref
People's Choice Award	Eastern Promises	David Cronenberg	
People's Choice Award, First Runner Up	Juno	Jason Reitman	
People's Choice Award, Second Runner Up	Body of War	Ellen Spiro, Phil Donahue	
Best Canadian Feature Film	My Winnipeg	Guy Maddin	
Best Canadian First Feature Film	Continental, a Film Without Guns (Continental, un film sans fusil)	Stéphane Lafleur	
Best Canadian Short Film	Pool (Kolam)	Chris Chong Chan Fui	
FIPRESCI Award	La Zona	Rodrigo Plá	
Discovery Award	Cochochi	Israel Cárdenas, Laura Amelia Guzmán	
NETPAC Award	Encarnación	Anahí Berneri	

In addition, film director and historian Peter Bogdanovich was given a special award by the International Federation of Film Archives for his contribution towards film preservation. The award was presented at a screening of Jean Renoir's Grand Illusion (1937) which Bogdanovich selected to illustrate the importance of film restoration.

== Programme ==
=== Gala Presentations ===
Gala Presentations spotlights prestige films of Canadian, American and foreign-language origins in equal measure. They are often world or North American premieres and are screened at the Roy Thomson Hall. Twenty films were selected.

David Cronenberg's Eastern Promises received the Cadillac People's Choice Award.

English title	Original title	Director(s)	Production country
Across the Universe		Julie Taymor	United States
Battle for Terra		Aristomenis Tsirbas	United States
Blood Brothers	Tian Tang Kou	Alexi Tan	Taiwan, China, Hong Kong
Caramel		Nadine Labaki	Lebanon, France
Cassandra's Dream		Woody Allen	United Kingdom
Cleaner		Renny Harlin	United States
Closing the Ring		Richard Attenborough	United Kingdom
Days of Darkness	L'Âge des ténèbres	Denys Arcand	Canada
Eastern Promises		David Cronenberg	Canada
Elizabeth: The Golden Age		Shekhar Kapur	United Kingdom
Emotional Arithmetic		Paolo Barzman	Canada
Fugitive Pieces		Jeremy Podeswa	Canada
The Jane Austen Book Club		Robin Swicord	United Kingdom
The Last Lear		Rituparno Ghosh	India
Michael Clayton		Tony Gilroy	United States
Rendition		Gavin Hood	United States
Reservation Road		Terry George	United States
The Second Wind	Le Deuxième souffle	Alain Corneau	France
Sleuth		Kenneth Branagh	United States
The Walker		Paul Schrader	United States, United Kingdom

=== Special Presentations ===
English title	Original title	Director(s)	Production country
4 Months, 3 Weeks and 2 Days	4 luni, 3 sǎptǎmâni şi 2 zile	Cristian Mungiu	Romania
Angel		François Ozon	France, United Kingdom, Belgium
The Assassination of Jesse James by the Coward Robert Ford		Andrew Dominik	United States
Atonement		Joe Wright	United Kingdom
Battle in Seattle		Stuart Townsend	United States
Before the Devil Knows You're Dead		Sidney Lumet	United States
Before the Rains		Santosh Sivan	United States
Bill		Melisa Wallack, Bernie Goldmann	United States
The Brave One		Neil Jordan	United States, Australia
Captain Mike Across America		Michael Moore	United States
Chaotic Ana	Caótica Ana	Julio Medem	Spain
Death Defying Acts		Gillian Armstrong	United Kingdom, Australia
The Girl in the Park		David Auburn	United States
Grand Illusion	La Grand Illusion	Jean Renoir	France
Here Is What Is		Adam Vollick, Daniel Lanois, Adam Samuels	Canada
Honeydripper		John Sayles	United States
I'm Not There		Todd Haynes	United States
In Bloom		Vadim Perelman	United States
In the Valley of Elah		Paul Haggis	United States
Into the Wild		Sean Penn	United States
Juno		Jason Reitman	United States
Lars and the Real Girl		Craig Gillespie	United States
Love Comes Lately	Bis später, Max!	Jan Schütte	Germany, Austria, United States
Lust, Caution	Sè, Jiè	Ang Lee	United States
Mad Detective		Johnnie To, Wai Ka-fai	Hong Kong
Man from Plains		Jonathan Demme	United States
Margot at the Wedding		Noah Baumbach	United States
Married Life		Ira Sachs	United States
Mongol		Sergei Bodrov	Germany, Kazakhstan, Mongolia, Russia
My Winnipeg		Guy Maddin	Canada
Nightwatching		Peter Greenaway	Canada, France, Germany, Poland, Netherlands, United Kingdom
No Country for Old Men		Joel Coen, Ethan Coen	United States
Nothing Is Private		Alan Ball	United States
Persepolis		Vincent Paronnaud, Marjane Satrapi	France
Poor Boy's Game		Clement Virgo	Canada
Rails & Ties		Alison Eastwood	United States
Reclaim Your Brain	Free Rainer - Dein Fernseher Lügt	Hans Weingartner	Germany
Redacted		Brian De Palma	United States
Romulus, My Father		Richard Roxburgh	Australia
The Savages		Tamara Jenkins	United States
The Diving Bell and the Butterfly	Le Scaphandre et le papillon	Julian Schnabel	France
Shadows		Milcho Manchevski	Macedonia, Germany, Italy, Bulgaria, Spain
Shake Hands with the Devil		Roger Spottiswoode	Canada
Silk		François Girard	Canada
The Sun Also Rises	Tai Yang Zhao Chang Sheng Qi	Jiang Wen	China
The Take		Brad Furman	United States
Then She Found Me		Helen Hunt	United States
To Each His Own Cinema	Chacun son cinéma	Theo Angelopoulos, Olivier Assayas, Bille August, Jane Campion, Youssef Chahine, Chen Kaige, David Cronenberg, Jean-Pierre Dardenne, Luc Dardenne, Manoel de Oliveira, Raymond Depardon, Atom Egoyan, Amos Gitai, Hou Hsiao-hsien, Alejandro González Iñárritu, Aki Kaurismäki, Abbas Kiarostami, Takeshi Kitano, Andrei Konchalovsky, Claude Lelouch, Ken Loach, David Lynch, Nanni Moretti, Roman Polanski, Raúl Ruiz, Walter Salles, Elia Suleiman, Tsai Ming-liang, Gus Van Sant, Lars von Trier, Wim Wenders, Wong Kar-wai, Zhang Yimou	France
The Visitor		Tom McCarthy	United States
When Did You Last See Your Father?		Anand Tucker	United Kingdom, Australia

=== Contemporary World Cinema ===
The Contemporary World Cinema programme features films from around the world. It included premieres and prize-winning films from other festivals. Sixty-two films were selected, including eight from Canada.

English title	Original title	Director(s)	Production country
All Hat		Leonard Farlinger	Canada
American Venus		Bruce Sweeney	Canada
And Along Come Tourists	Am Ende kommen Touristen	Robert Thalheim	Germany
The Band's Visit	Bikur Hatizmoret	Eran Kolirin	Israel, France
The Banishment	Izgnanie	Andrey Zvyagintsev	Russia
Barcelona (A Map)	Barcelona (un mapa)	Ventura Pons	Spain
Battle for Haditha		Nick Broomfield	United Kingdom
Before I Forget	Avant que j'oublie	Jacques Nolot	France
Breakfast with Scot		Laurie Lynd	Canada
Brick Lane		Sarah Gavron	United Kingdom
California Dreamin' (Endless)	California Dreamin' (Nesfarsit)	Cristian Nemescu	Romania
Chop Shop		Ramin Bahrani	IUnited States
The Counterfeiters	Die Fälscher	Stefan Ruzowitzky	Austria, Germany
Days and Clouds	Giorni e nuvole	Silvio Soldini	Italy, Switzerland
The Edge of Heaven	Auf der Anderen Seite	Fatih Akin	Germany, Turkey
Empties	Vratné Lahve	Jan Svěrák	Czechia
Erik Nietzsche The Early Years	Erik Nietzsche de unge år	Jacob Thuesen	Denmark
Faro, Goddess of the Waters	Faro, la reine des eaux	Salif Traoré	France, Canada, Germany, Mali, Burkina Faso
Forever Never Anywhere	Immer Nie am Meer	Antonin Svoboda	Austria
Garage		Lenny Abrahamson	Ireland
A Gentle Breeze in the Village	Tennen Kokekkō	Nobuhiro Yamashita	Japan
Gone with the Woman	Tatt av kvinnen	Petter Næss	Norway
Happiness	Haeng-bok	Hur Jin-ho	South Korea
The Home Song Stories		Tony Ayres	Australia
In Memory of Myself	In memoria di me	Saverio Costanzo	Italy
Intimate Enemies	L'Ennemi intime	Florent-Emilio Siri	France
Iska's Journey	Iszka utazása	Csaba Bollók	Hungary
Jar City	Mýrin	Baltasar Kormákur	Iceland, Germany
Jellyfish	Meduzot	Shira Geffen, Etgar Keret	Israel, FRance
Just Like Home	Hjemve	Lone Scherfig	Denmark
King of California		Mike Cahill	United States
Kings		Tom Collins	United Kingdom
The Last Mistress	Une vieille maîtresse	Catherine Breillat	France
The Mourning Forest	Mogari No Mori	Naomi Kawase	France, Japan
Munyurangabo		Lee Isaac Chung	United States
Mutum		Sandra Kogut	Brazil
My Brother Is an Only Child	Mio fratello è figlio unico	Daniele Luchetti	Italy, France
New York City Serenade		Frank Whaley	United States
Normal		Carl Bessai	Canada
On the Wings of Dreams	Swopnodanay	Golam Rabbany Biplob	Bangladesh
Our Private Lives	Nos vies privées	Denis Côté	Canada
Philippine Science	Pisay	Auraeus Solito	Philippines
The Pope's Toilet	El Baño del Papa	Enrique Fernández, César Charlone	Uruguay, Brazil, France
Run, Fat Boy, Run		David Schwimmer	United Kingdom
Secret Sunshine	Miryang	Lee Chang-dong	South Korea
The Secrets		Avi Nesher	Israel, France
The Shock Doctrine		Alfonso Cuarón, Jonás Cuarón, Naomi Klein	Canada, United Kingdom
Slingshot	Tirador	Brillante Mendoza	Philippines
Son of Rambow		Garth Jennings	France, United Kingdom, Germany
Starting Out in the Evening		Andrew Wagner	United States
The Stone Angel		Kari Skogland	Canada
A Stray Girlfriend	Una novia errante	Ana Katz	Argentina
Summit Circle	Contre toute espérance	Bernard Émond	Canada
To Love Someone	Den Man Älskar	Åke Sandgren	Sweden
The Trap	Klopka	Srdan Golubović	Serbia, Germany, Hungary
The Trial Begins	L'ora di punta	Vincenzo Marra	Italy
Two Ladies	Dans la vie	Philippe Faucon	France
Under the Same Moon	La Misma Luna	Patricia Riggen	Mexico, United States
Unfinished Sky		Peter Duncan	Australia
Unfinished Stories	Ravayat haye na tamam	Pourya Azarbayjani	Iran
Weirdsville		Allan Moyle	Canada
Wolfsbergen		Nanouk Leopold	Netherlands

=== Masters ===
The Masters programme features films by world-renowned filmmakers. Twenty films were selected.

English title	Original title	Director(s)	Production country
Alexandra		Alexander Sokurov	Russia
Beyond the Years	Chun-Nyun-Hack	Im Kwon-taek	South Korea
Chaos, This Is	Heya Fawda	Youssef Chahine, Khaled Youssef	Egypt, France
Christopher Columbus – The Enigma	Cristóvão Colombo – O Enigma	Manoel de Oliveira	Portugal
Disengagement		Amos Gitai	Israel, France, Germany, Italy
The Duchess of Langeais	Ne touchez pas la hache	Jacques Rivette	France, Italy
Fados		Carlos Saura	Spain
Flight of the Red Balloon	Le Voyage du ballon rouge	Hou Hsiao-hsien	France
Four Women	Naalu Pennunga	Adoor Gopalakrishnan	India
A Girl Cut in Two	La Fille coupée en deux	Claude Chabrol	France, Germany
Glory to the Filmmaker!	Kantoku Banzai!	Takeshi Kitano	Japan
It's a Free World...		Ken Loach	United Kingdom, Germany, Italy, Spain
The Man from London	A London Férfi	Béla Tarr	France, Germany, Hungary
One Hundred Nails	Centochiodi	Ermanno Olmi	Italy
The Past	El Pasado	Héctor Babenco	Argentina, Brazil
The Princess of Nebraska		Wayne Wang	United States
Romance of Astrea and Celadon	Les Amours d'Astrée et de Céladon	Eric Rohmer	France, Italy, Spain
A Thousand Years of Good Prayers		Wayne Wang	United States
Ulzhan		Volker Schlöndorff	Germany, France, Kazakhstan
The Voyeurs	Ami, Yasin Ar Amar Madhubala	Buddhadev Dasgupta	India

=== Visions ===
English title	Original title	Director(s)	Production country
Buddha Collapsed Out of Shame	Buda As Sharm Foru Rikht	Hana Makhmalbaf	Iran
Death in the Land of Encantos	Kagadanan sa Banwaan ning mga Engkanto	Lav Diaz	Philippines
Dr Plonk		Rolf de Heer	Australia
Eat, For This Is My Body		Michelange Quay	Haiti, France
Encarnación		Anahí Berneri	Argentina
Hidden Love	L'Amour caché	Alessandro Capone	Italy, Luxembourg, Belgium
Happy New Life	Boldog új élet	Árpád Bogdán	Hungary
Import/Export		Ulrich Seidl	Austria
In the City of Sylvia	En la ciudad de Sylvia	José Luis Guerín	Spain
M		Lee Myung-se	South Korea
Night		Lawrence Johnston	Australia
Pink	Roz	Alexander Voulgaris	Greece
Ploy		Pen-ek Ratanaruang	Thailand
Silent Light	Stellet Licht	Carlos Reygadas	Mexico, France, Netherlands
Silent Resident	Weisse Lilien	Christian Frosch	Austria, Germany, Luxembourg, Hungary
Time to Die	Pora Umierać	Dorota Kędzierzawska	Poland
The Tracey Fragments		Bruce McDonald	Canada
Under the Roofs of Paris	Sous les toits de Paris	Hiner Saleem	France
You, the Living	Du levande	Roy Andersson	Sweden, Denmark, France, Germany, Norway

=== Discovery ===
The Discovery programme features the work of new film directors from around the world. Fourteen films were selected. Israel Cárdenas and Laura Amelia Guzmán's feature debut Cochochi won the DIESEL Discovery Award and a CA$10 000 bursary. The International Federation of Film Critics returned to the festival for the 16th year and awarded Rodrigo Plá's La Zona the FIPRESCI Prize.

English title	Original title	Director(s)	Production country
The Babysitters		David Ross	United States
Blind		Tamar van den Dop	Netherlands, Belgium, Bulgaria
Cochochi		Israel Cárdenas, Laura Amelia Guzmán	Mexico
Corroboree		Ben Hackworth	Australia
Frozen		Shivajee Chandrabhushan	India
I Am from Titov Veles	Jas Sum od Titov Veles	Teona Strugar Mitevska	Macedonia
King of the Hill	El rey de la montaña	Gonzalo López-Gallego	Spain
The Passage		Mark Heller	United States
ROMing		Jiří Vejdělek	Czechia
September		Peter Carstairs	Australia
Those Three	An Seh	Naghi Nemati	Iran
With Your Permission	Til Døden Os Skiller	Paprika Steen	Denmark, Sweden
The World Unseen		Shamim Sarif	United Kingdom, South Africa
La Zona		Rodrigo Plá	Spain, Mexico

=== Real to Reel ===
English title	Original title	Director(s)	Production country
Algeria, Unspoken Stories	Algérie, histoires à ne pas dire	Jean-Pierre Lledo	Algeria, FRance
Amazing Journey: The Story of The Who		Paul Crowder, Murray Lerner	United Kingdom
Body of War		Ellen Spiro, Phil Donahue	United States
Callas Assoluta		Philippe Kohly	France
Children of the Sun	Yaldey Hashemesh	Ran Tal	Israel
Darfur Now		Ted Braun	United States
The Dictator Hunter		Klaartje Quirijns	Netherlands
Dinner with the President: A Nation's Journey		Sabiha Sumar, Sachithanandam Sathananthan	Pakistan
Encounters at the End of the World		Werner Herzog	United States
Fengming, a Chinese Memoir	He Fengming	Wang Bing	China, Hong Kong, Belgium
Glass: A Portrait of Philip in Twelve Parts		Scott Hicks	United States
Heavy Metal in Baghdad		Eddy Moretti, Suroosh Alvi	Canada, United States
Hollywood Chinese		Arthur Dong	United States
Iron Ladies of Liberia		Daniel Junge, Siatta Scott Johnson	Liberia
A Jihad for Love		Parvez Sharma	United States
Joy Division		Grant Gee	United Kingdom
Lou Reed's Berlin		Julian Schnabel	United Kingdom, United States
Man of Cinema: Pierre Rissient		Todd McCarthy	United States
The Mosquito Problem and Other Stories	Problemat s komarite i drugi istorii	Andrey Paounov	Bulgaria
My Enemy's Enemy		Kevin Macdonald	United Kingdom
My Kid Could Paint That		Amir Bar-Lev	United States, United Kingdom
Obscene		Neil Ortenberg, Daniel O'Connor	United States
Operation Filmmaker		Nina Davenport	United States
Please Vote for Me		Weijun Chen	South Africa
A Promise to the Dead: The Exile Journey of Ariel Dorfman		Peter Raymont	Canada
Rebellion: The Litvinenko Case	Bunt. Delo Litvinenko	Andrei Nekrasov	Russia
Surfwise		Doug Pray	United States
Terror's Advocate	L'Avocat de la terreur	Barbet Schroeder	France
Trumbo		Peter Askin	United States
Useless	Wu Yong	Jia Zhangke	China
Very Young Girls		David Schisgall	United States
The Wild Horse Redemption		John Zaritsky	Canada

=== Midnight Madness ===
English title	Original title	Director(s)	Production country
Big Man Japan	Dai Nipponjin	Hitoshi Matsumoto	Japan
The Devil's Chair		Adam Mason	United Kingdom
Diary of the Dead		George A. Romero	Canada, United States
Flash Point	Dao Huo Xian	Wilson Yip	Hong Kong
Frontier(s)	Frontière(s)	Xavier Gens	France, Switzerland
Inside	À l'intérieur	Alexandre Bustillo, Julien Maury	France
Mother of Tears	La Terza madre	Dario Argento	Italy, United States
Stuck		Stuart Gordon	Canada, United Kingdom, United States
Sukiyaki Western Django	Sukiyaki Uesutan Jango	Takashi Miike	Japan
Vexille	Bekushiru 2077 Nihon sakoku	Fumihiko Sori	Japan

=== Vanguard ===
English title	Original title	Director(s)	Production country
Boy A		John Crowley	United Kingdom
Chrysalis		Julien Leclercq	France
Control		Anton Corbijn	United Kingdom, United States
Déficit		Gael García Bernal	Mexico
Ex Drummer		Koen Mortier	Belgium
The Exodus		Pang Ho-Cheung	Hong Kong
Help Me Eros	Bang Bang Wo Ai Shen	Lee Kang-sheng	Taiwan
Love Songs	Les Chansons d'amour	Christophe Honoré	France
me	yo	Rafa Cortés	Spain
Mister Lonely		Harmony Korine	United Kingdom, France, Ireland, United States
The Orphanage	El Orfanato	Juan Antonio Bayona	Spain, Mexico
Paranoid Park		Gus Van Sant	France, United States
Ping Pong Playa		Jessica Yu	United States
Sad Vacation	Saddo Vakeishon	Shinji Aoyama	Japan
Smiley Face		Gregg Araki	United States, Germany
Water Lilies	Naissance des pieuvres	Céline Sciamma	France
White Lies, Black Sheep		James Spooner	United States
XXY		Lucía Puenzo	Argentina

=== Canada First! ===
The Canada First! programme features first or second time Canadian film directors and established Canadian filmmakers who have not previously appeared in the festival. Eight films were selected to appear in the festival.

Stéphane Lafleur's directorial debut Continental, a Film Without Guns won the Citytv Award for Best Canadian First Feature Film and a CA$15 000 bursary.

English title	Original title	Director(s)	Production country
Amal		Richie Mehta	Canada
Continental, a Film Without Guns	Continental, un film sans fusil	Stéphane Lafleur	Canada
Just Buried		Chaz Thorne	Canada
Mona's Daughters	Le Cèdre penché	Rafaël Ouellet	Canada
They Wait		Ernie Barbarash	Canada
This Beautiful City		Ed Gass-Donnelly	Canada
Walk All Over Me		Robert Cuffley	Canada
Young People Fucking		Martin Gero	Canada

=== Short Cuts Canada ===
English title	Original title	Director(s)	Production country
Automoto		Neil McInnes, Cathy McInnes	Canada
Blood Will Tell		Andrew McPhillips	Canada
Boar Attack		Jay White	Canada
Bumblebee		Jonathan van Tulleken	Canada
Burgeon and Fade		Audrey Cummings	Canada
Can You Wave Bye-Bye?		Sarah Galea-Davis	Canada
The Canadian Shield		Simon Ennis	Canada
Code 13		Mathieu Denis	Canada
The Colony		Jeff Barnaby	Canada
Congratulations Daisy Graham		Cassandra Nicolaou	Canada
A Cure for Terminal Loneliness		Samir Rehem	Canada
Cursing Hanley		Kelly Harms	Canada
Dada Dum		Britt Randle	Canada
Diamonds in a Bucket		Sherry White	Canada
Dust Bowl Ha! Ha!		Sébastien Pilote	Canada
Farmer's Requiem		Ramses Madina	Canada
found oBjects		David Birnbaum	Canada
Four Walls		Raha Shirazi	Canada
francas		Eduardo Menz	Canada
Gene Boy Came Home		Alanis Obomsawin	Canada
God Provides		Brian M. Cassidy, Melanie Shatzky	Canada
Hastings Street		Larry Kent	Canada
Hirsute		A.J. Bond	Canada
Hymn to Pan		François Miron	Canada
I Have Seen the Future		Cam Christiansen	Canada
I've Never Had Sex...		Robert Kennedy	Canada
Knights of Atomikaron		Adam Brodie, Dave Derewlany	Canada
The Last Moment		Deco Dawson	Canada
Latchkey's Lament		Troy Nixey	Canada
Loudly, Death Unties		Sheila Pye, Nicholas Pye	Canada
Madame Tutli-Putli		Chris Lavis, Maciek Szczerbowski	Canada
No Bikini		Claudia Morgado Escanilla	Canada
Paradise		Jesse Rosensweet	Canada
ReOrder		Sean Garrity	Canada
The Schoolyard	Les Grands	Chloé Leriche	Canada
Shooting Geronimo		Kent Monkman	Canada
A Short Film About Falling		Peter Lynch, Max Dean	Canada
Smile		Julia Kwan	Canada
Teenage Girl		Greg Atkins	Canada
Terminus		Trevor Cawood	Canada
Terry Southern's Plums and Prunes		Dev Khanna	Canada
Three Beans for George		Sean Anicic	Canada
Tic Tac Toe		Matthew Swanson	Canada
The Whole Day Through		Adam Budd	Canada

=== Wavelengths ===
English title	Original title	Director(s)	Production country
The Acrobat		Chris Kennedy	Canada, United States
All That Rises		Daïchi Saïto	Canada
The Anthem		Apichatpong Weerasethakul	Thailand
At Sea		Peter Hutton	United States
The Butterfly in Winter		Ute Aurand, Maria Lang	Germany
Capitalism: Slavery		Ken Jacobs	United STates
Cross Worlds		Cécile Fontaine	France
Discoveries on the Forest Floor 1-3		Charlotte Pryce	United States
Echo		Izabella Pruska-Oldenhof	Canada
ecp 2D: sun		John Price	Canada
Erzählung		Hannes Schüpbach	Switzerland, Italy
Europa 2005, 27 Octobre		Jean-Marie Straub, Danièle Huillet	Italy
Evertwo Circumflicksrent...Page 298		Bruce McClure	United States
gone		Karoe Goldt	Germany, Austria
Monica		Enrico Mandirola	France
Papillon		Olivier Fouchard	France
Pool	Kolam	Chris Chong Chan Fui	Canada, Malaysia
Pour vos beaux yeux		Henri Storck	Belgium
Profit Motive and the Whispering Wind		John Gianvito	United States
Quartet		Nicky Hamlyn	United States
Schindler's Houses (Photography and Beyond Part 12)		Heinz Emigholz	Austria
Tape Film		Chris Kennedy	Canada, United States
What the Water Said, nos. 4-6		David Gatten	United States
Wrong Moves	Faux mouvements	Pip Chodorov	France

=== Canadian Retrospective ===
The Canadian Retrospective programme features a section of films representing an aspect of the history of Canadian cinema. It was the seventh year the festival has held the retrospective.

English title	Original title	Director(s)	Production country
Acadia, Acadia	L'Acadie, l'Acadie?!?	Michel Brault, Pierre Perrault	Canada
Chronicle of a Summer	Chronique d'un été	Edgar Morin, Jean Rouch	Canada
Drifting Upstream	Entre la mer et l'eau douce	Michel Brault	Canada
Geneviève		Michel Brault	Canada
The Moon Trap	Pour la suite du monde	Pierre Perrault, Michel Brault	Canada
Orders	Les Ordres	Michel Brault	Canada
The Paper Wedding	Les Noces de papier	Michel Brault	Canada
The Snowshoers	Les Raquetteurs	Gilles Groulx, Michel Brault	Canada
Wrestling	La Lutte	Claude Fournier, Marcel Carrière, Claude Jutra, Michel Brault	Canada

=== Canadian Open Vault ===
The Canadian Open Vault programme features a recently restored and iconic Canadian film.

English title	Original title	Director(s)	Production country
Good Riddance	Les Bons débarras	Francis Mankiewicz	Canada

=== Sprockets Family Zone ===
English title	Original title	Director(s)	Production country
The Besieged Fortress	La Citadelle assiégée	Philippe Calderon	France, Canada
Max & Co		Frédéric Guillaume, Samuel Guillaume	Belgium, France, Switzerland
Mid Road Gang	Ma-Mha-See-Kha-Krub	Pantham Thongsang, Somkiat Vithuranich	Thailand
Nocturna		Victor Maldonado, Adriàn García	Spain
The Substitute	Vikaren	Ole Bornedal	Denmark

== Events ==
=== Mavericks ===
Mavericks features discussions with film industry and other professionals. Four events were held on a variety of socio-political topics. Former President of the United States Jimmy Carter and his wife Rosalynn Carter discussed their activist work after his presidential term. Comedians Bill Maher and Larry Charles tackled religion. Mira Nair brought together three other Indian filmmakers who covered HIV/AIDS and screened four new short films on the subject. Finally, the conflict in Sudan was discussed by the Chief Prosecutor of the International Criminal Court, Luis Moreno-Ocampo, and a panel of filmmakers.

- Everything to Gain: A Conversation with Jimmy and Rosalynn Carter with Jimmy and Rosalynn Carter; moderated by Allan Gregg
- Mira Nair Presents: Four Views on AIDS in India with Mira Nair, Santosh Sivan, Vishal Bhardwaj and Farhan Akhtar; moderated by Mira Nair and Ashok Alexander
- Religulous: A Conversation with Bill Maher and Larry Charles with Bill Maher and Larry Charles
- The Time Is Now: A Conversation About Darfur with Luis Moreno-Ocampo, Don Cheadle, Adam Sterling, Ted Braun, Mark Jonathan Harris and Cathy Schulman

=== Dialogues: Talking With Pictures ===
The Dialogues: Talking With Pictures series features a selection of classic films which are chosen and introduced by well-known directors or artists who have found a given film influential or pivotal throughout the course of their own career. Eight films were selected between nine filmmakers and artists.

- Alice Doesn't Live Here Anymore (1974) directed by Martin Scorsese; introduced by actress Ellen Burstyn
- The Best Years of Our Lives (1946) directed by William Wyler; introduced by director Sidney Lumet
- Bucking Broadway (1917) directed by John Ford; introduced by director Peter Bogdanovich
- Closely Watched Trains (Ostře Sledované Vlaky, 1966) directed by Jiří Menzel; introduced by director Ken Loach
- La jetée (1962) directed by Chris Marker; introduced by architect Bruce Kuwabara
- Oh! What a Lovely War (1969) directed by Richard Attenborough; introduced by Lord Richard Attenborough
- Rodgers and Hammerstein's Flower Drum Song (1961) directed by Henry Koster; introduced by actress Nancy Kwan and director Arthur Dong
- The Virgin Spring (Jungfrukällan, 1960) directed by Ingmar Bergman; introduced by actor Max von Sydow

=== Doc Talks ===
The Doc Talk series features discussions with various documentary filmmakers on topics such as the future of the medium and their work and its subject matter. Clips from their new and upcoming documentaries are screened. The series was opened to the public for the first time. Topics included biography films, Michel Brault, war and democracy.

- Biography: Complicated Lives with Scott Hicks, Peter Raymont and Peter Askin
- Canadian Retrospective: Michel Brault with Denys Arcand and Michel Brault; moderated by André Loiselle
- Covering War with Michael Tucker, Phil Donahue and Ellen Spiro
- Why Democracy? with Nick Fraser

=== Future Projections ===
The Future Projections programme features non-theatrical installations in various mediums. This marked the programme's inaugural run. Nine installations were curated by the Toronto International Film Festival Group and other Torontonian cultural institutions. Admission was free for all exhibitions, with the exception of the exhibit at the Power Plant Contemporary Art Gallery which was free only to festival passholders.

- Best Minds Part One – created by Jeremy Shaw; curated by Wayne Baerwaldt
- Darfur/Darfur – created by various artists; curated by Leslie Thomas
- Death in the Land of Encantos (Kagadanan sa Banwaan ning mga Engkanto) – created by Lav Diaz; curated by Cameron Bailey
- Francesco Vezzoli: A True Hollywood Story! – created by Francesco Vezzoli; curated by Gregory Burke
- Into the Pixel – created by various artists; organized by Nick Pagee
- Late Fragment – directed by Daryl Cloran, Anita Doron and Mateo Guez; produced by Anita Lee and Ana Serrano
- The Soft Revolution – directed by Brian Johnson and Anthony Roberts
- Tyranny – created by Ryan Sluggett; organized by Wayne Baerwaldt
- Wildflowers of Manitoba – created by Noam Gonick and Luis Jacob; curated by Wayne Baerwaldt

== Images ==
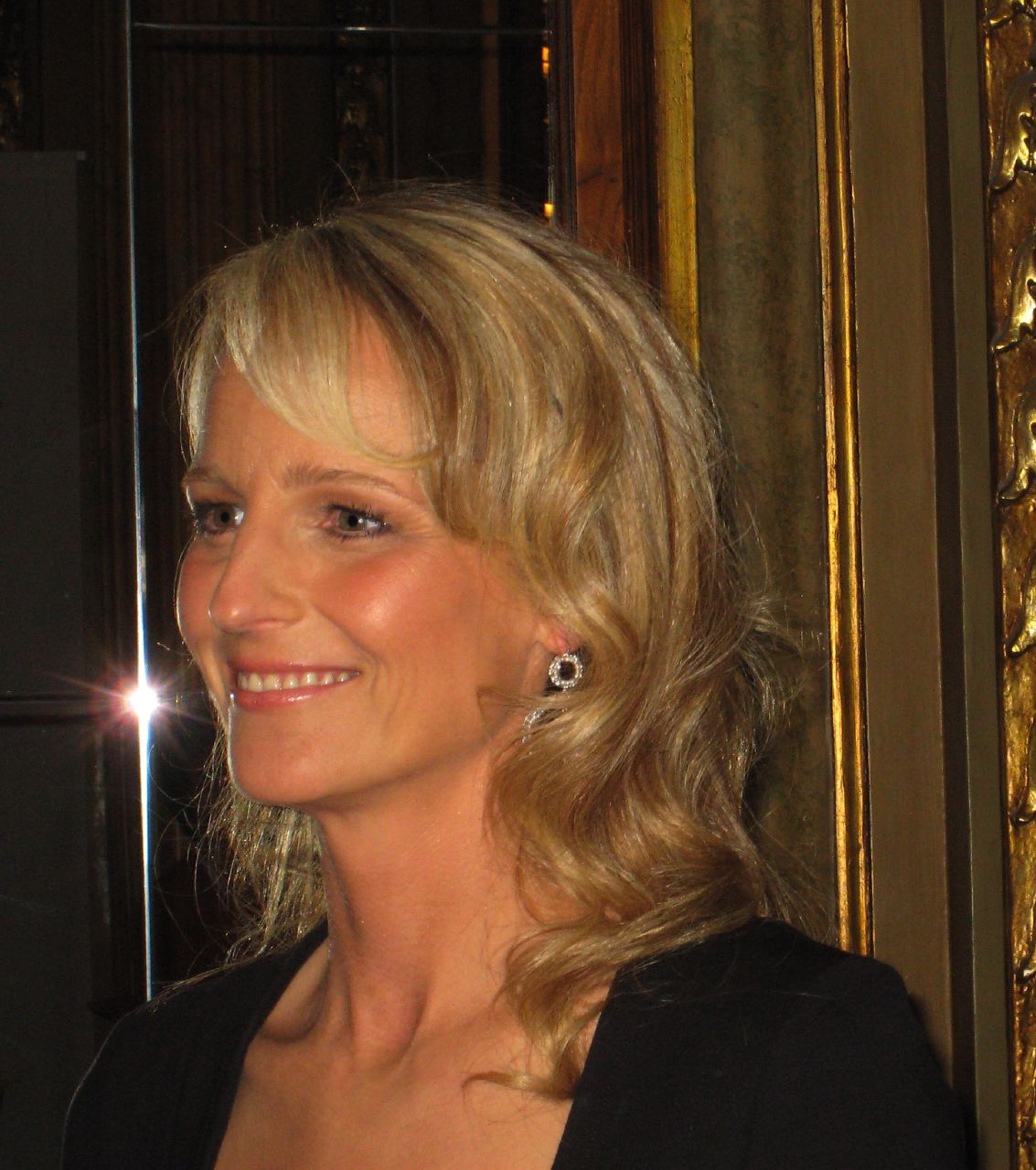
Helen Hunt at the Elgin Theatre for her film Then She Found Me

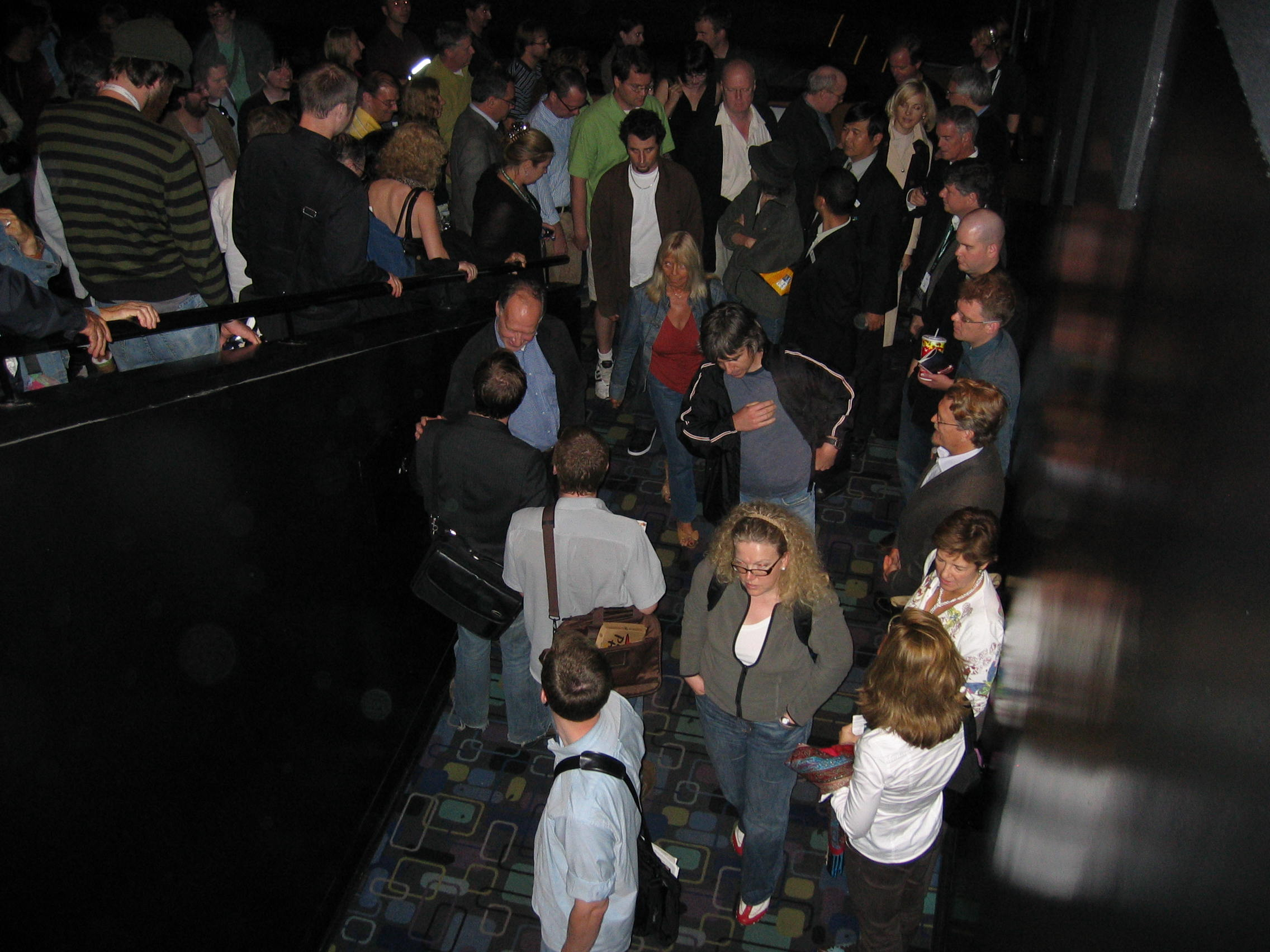
Werner Herzog talking with an audience member as a crowd exits an Encounters at the End of the World screening at the Paramount Theatre

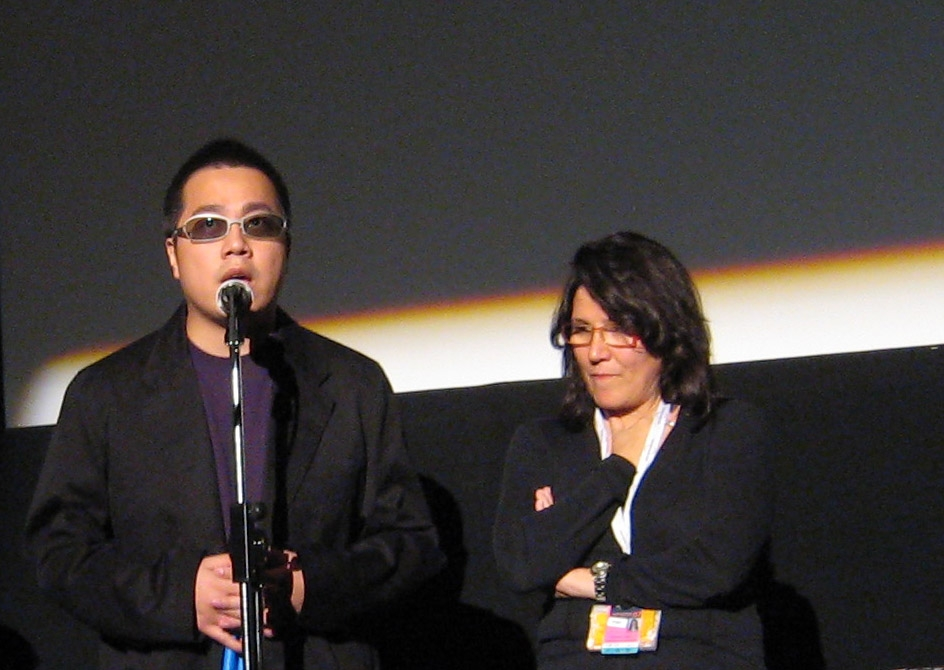
Director Pang Ho-Cheung (left) addresses the audience at a screening of his film The Exodus

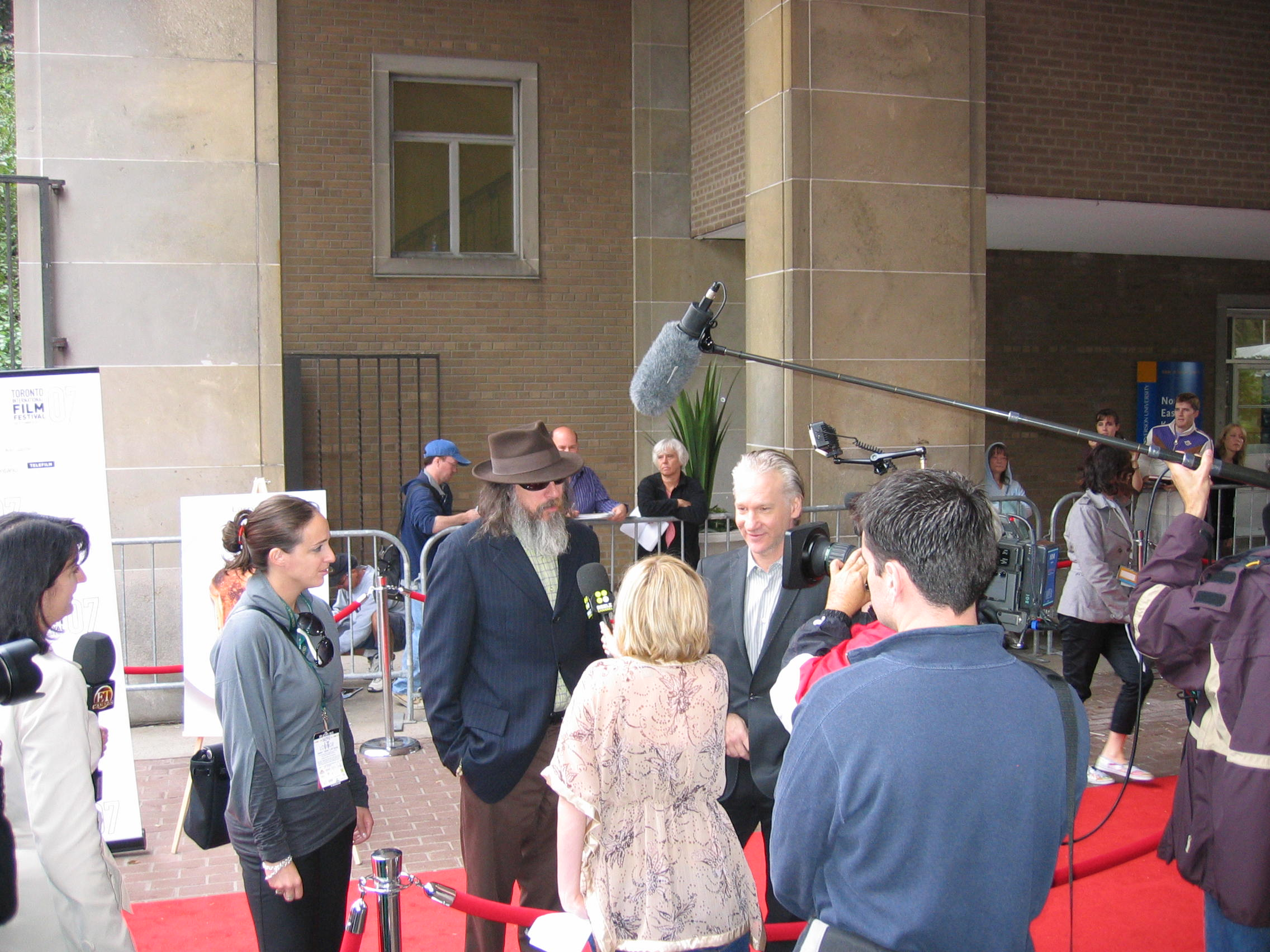
Larry Charles and Bill Maher discuss Religulous outside of Ryerson Theatre.

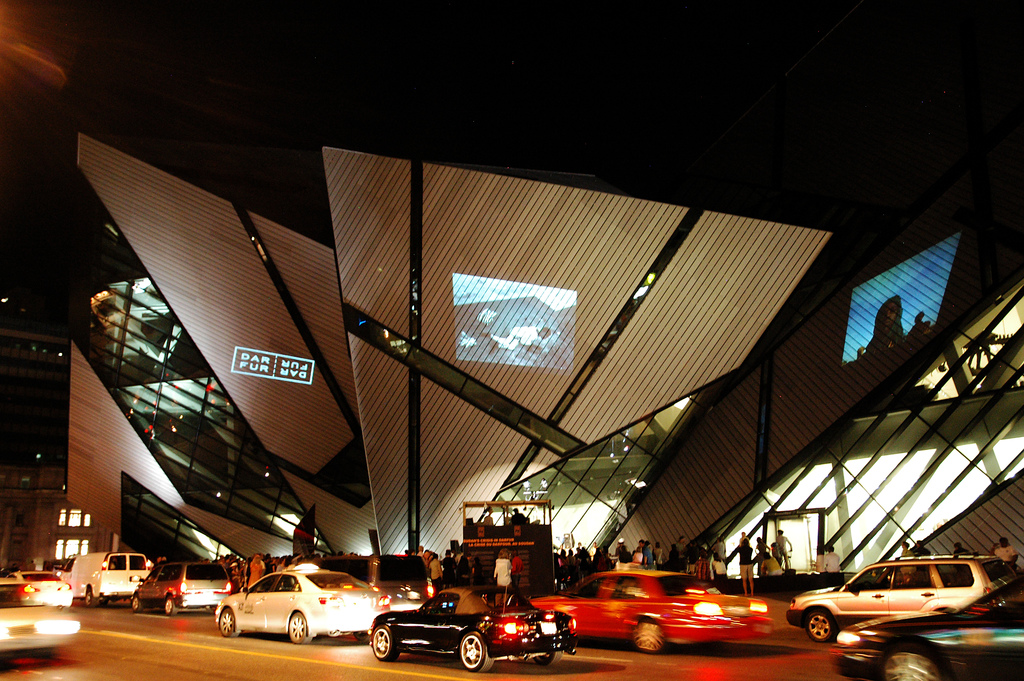
Darfur/Darfur installation outside of the Royal Ontario Museum

== Canada's Top Ten ==
TIFF's annual Canada's Top Ten list, its national critics and festival programmers poll of the ten best feature and short films of the year, was released in December 2007. For the first time, separate lists of feature and short films were announced.

=== Feature films ===
- Amal – Richie Mehta
- Continental, a Film Without Guns (Continental, un film sans fusil) – Stéphane Lafleur
- Days of Darkness (L'Âge des ténèbres) – Denys Arcand
- Eastern Promises – David Cronenberg
- Fugitive Pieces – Jeremy Podeswa
- My Winnipeg – Guy Maddin
- A Promise to the Dead: The Exile Journey of Ariel Dorfman – Peter Raymont
- The Tracey Fragments – Bruce McDonald
- Up the Yangtze – Yung Chang
- Young People Fucking – Martin Gero

=== Short films ===
- Code 13 – Mathieu Denis
- The Colony – Jeff Barnaby
- Dust Bowl Ha! Ha! – Sébastien Pilote
- Farmer's Requiem – Ramses Madina
- I Have Seen the Future – Cam Christiansen
- I Met the Walrus – Josh Raskin
- Madame Tutli-Putli – Chris Lavis, Maciek Szczerbowski
- Pool – Chris Chong Chan Fui
- The Schoolyard (Les Grands) – Chloé Leriche
- Terminus – Trevor Cawood
