= Michel Mongeau =

Michel Mongeau may refer to:

- Michel Mongeau (ice hockey)
- Michel Mongeau (actor)
