= Royal College of Art =

Postgraduate art and design university in London, England

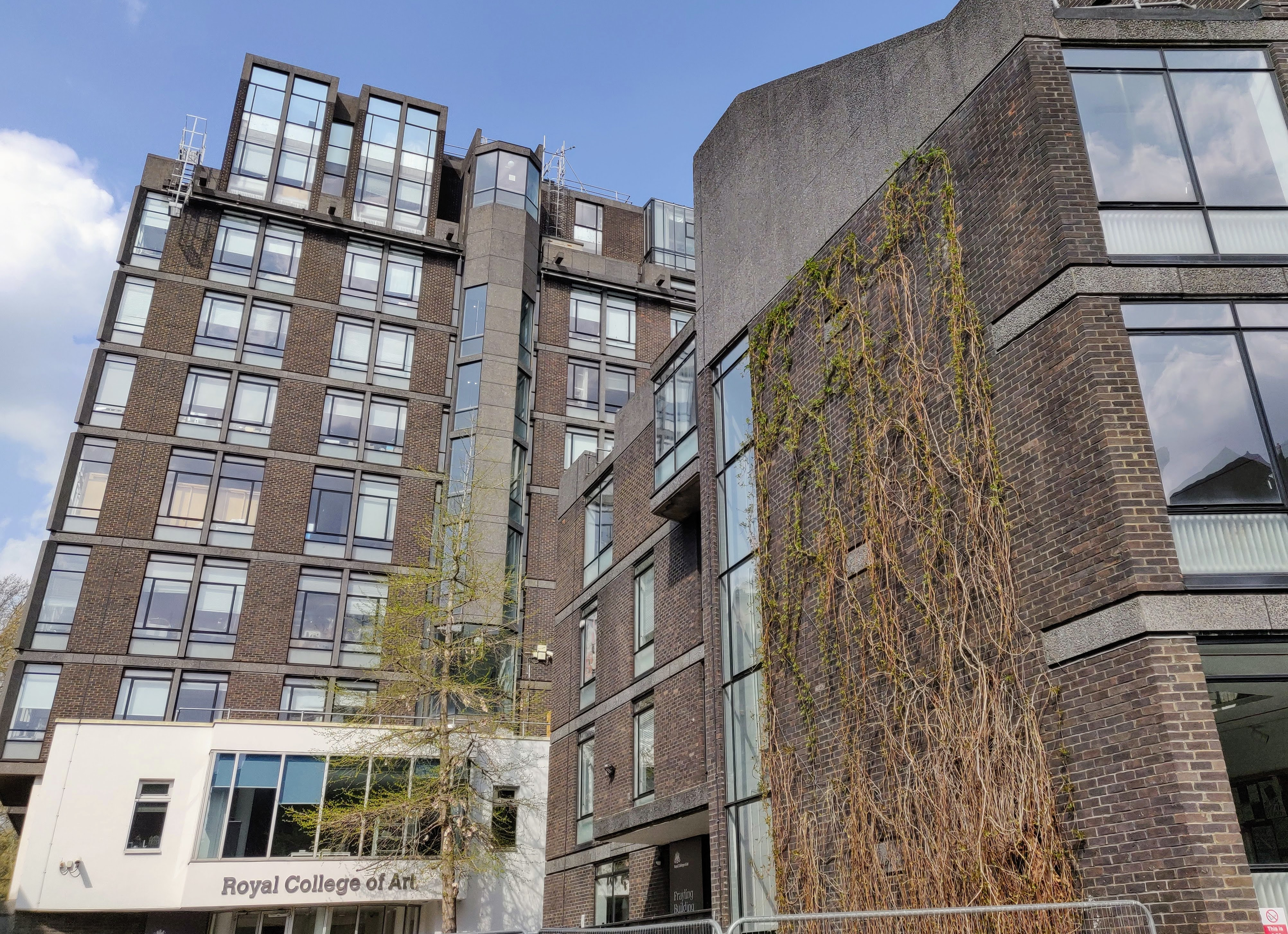
- Royal College of Art in South Kensington
- Motto: Dieu et mon droit
- Motto in English: God and my right
- Type: Public
- Established: 1837 – Government School of Design; 1896 – Royal College of Art; 1967 – degree-awarding powers
- Endowment: £39.6 million (2025)
- Budget: £94.7 million (2024/25)
- Chancellor: Sir Jonathan Ive
- Vice-Chancellor: Professor Christoph Lindner
- Students: 2,555 (2024/25)
- Undergraduates: 0
- Location: London, United Kingdom
- Campus: Urban
- Language: English
- Website: rca.ac.uk

The Royal College of Art (RCA) is a public research university in London, England, with campuses in South Kensington, Battersea and White City. It is the only entirely postgraduate art and design university in the United Kingdom.

== History ==
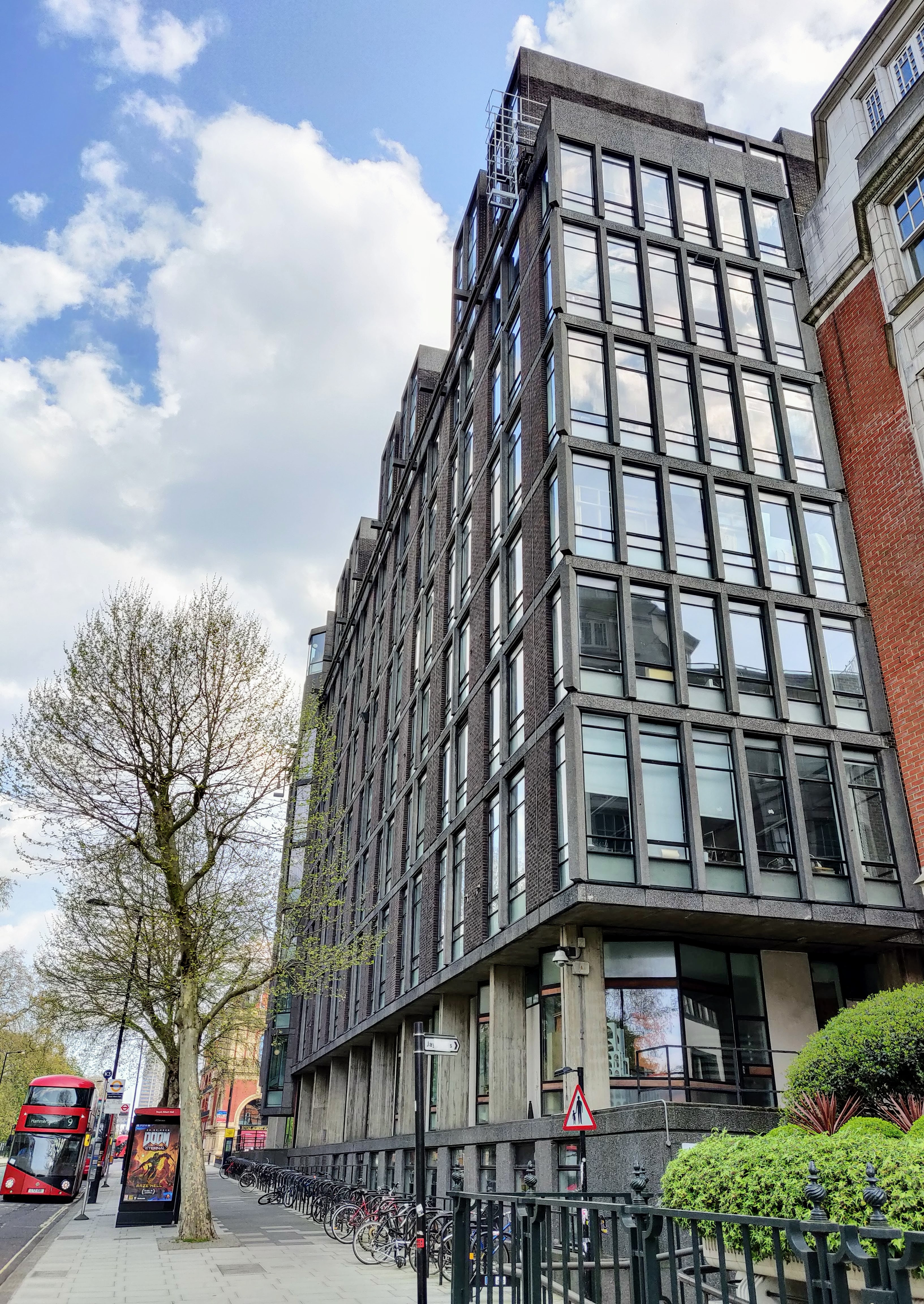
The Darwin Building on Kensington Gore

The RCA was founded in Somerset House in 1837 as the Government School of Design or Metropolitan School of Design. By 1848, more than 300 students were attending classes each day.

The number of pupils at present (June 1848) attending at Somerset House is about 80 in the morning, 260 in the evening, and about 50 females. The greater part of the students are the sons of tradesmen and of the upper class of artisans; the females are principally the daughters of professional men, or such as are being educated for governesses.

Richard Burchett became head of the school in 1852.

The Science and Art Department was a government department established in 1853 to promote education in art, science, technology, and design in Britain and Ireland. The Department funded a large site in South Kensington that housed the Science and Art Department, the South Kensington Museum, and other bodies, and the Science and Art Department took over the Government School of Design. Owing to this association, the college has been referred to in several (mostly colonial) sources as the "South Kensington School of Science and Art".

In 1853 it was expanded and moved to Marlborough House, and then, in 1853 or 1857, to South Kensington, on the same site as the South Kensington Museum. It was renamed the Normal Training School of Art in 1857 and the National Art Training School in 1863. During the later 19th century it was primarily a teacher training college; pupils during this period included George Clausen, Christopher Dresser, Luke Fildes, Kate Greenaway and Gertrude Jekyll.

In September 1896, the school received the name "Royal College of Art", and the emphasis of teaching there shifted to the practice of art and design. The Science and Art Department was merged into the Board of Education in 1899.

Teaching of graphic design, industrial design and product design began in the mid-twentieth century. The school expanded further in the 1960s, and in 1967 it received a royal charter (amended in 2021) which gave it the power to grant its own degrees.

In July 2020, the Royal College of Art launched its first-ever online graduate exhibition, RCA2020.

== Campuses ==
The RCA today has three campuses located in South Kensington, Battersea and White City.

The Darwin Building in Kensington Gore, South Kensington, was completed 1960–1963. It is a short distance from the RCA's home 1896–1967 in the Henry Cole Building, now part of the V&A Museum. The Darwin Building was designed by a team of RCA staff members, H. T. Cadbury-Brown, Hugh Casson and Robert Goodden, and since 2001 has been a Grade II listed building. It is named after painter Sir Robert Vere Darwin, known as Robin Darwin, who was the rector at the time the building was commissioned. Although there was modest development into the mews behind the Darwin Building, the restricted site meant further expansion had to be in another part of London.

In 1991, the sculpture department moved to a converted factory in Battersea. In the early 2000s the college conceived a substantial extension on the site, with a minibus service linking it to Kensington. After a redevelopment by Wright & Wright (budget £4.3m, floor area 2,500 sq m), the Sculpture Building opened in Battersea in January 2009. In 2018 the RCA was granted planning permission to redevelop the Sculpture building into a new Arts & Humanities building, designed by Herzog & de Meuron, with work planned for completion in late 2021.

A masterplan was commissioned from Haworth Tompkins and phase one of their three-phase design was completed with the opening of the Sackler Building on 19 November 2009, to house the painting department. Its name commemorated a major gift by The Dr Mortimer and Theresa Sackler Foundation. The Sackler Building was renamed as the Painting Building in 2022.

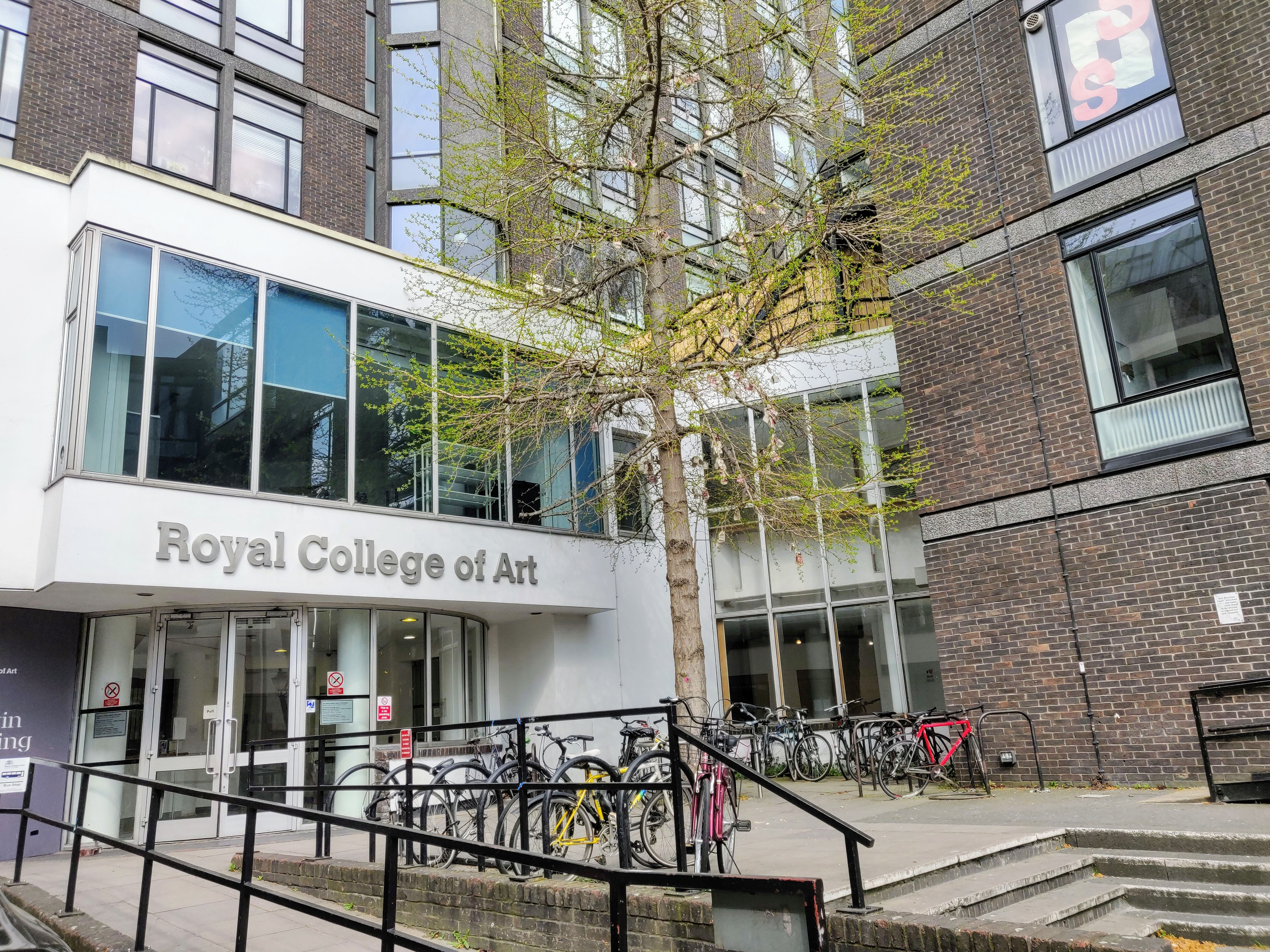
Entrance

The Dyson Building, named in honour of James Dyson, whose charity donated £5m towards the £21m cost, was opened on 24 September 2012. It houses printmaking and photography, and contains an innovation wing where start-up designers can launch their businesses. The Woo Building was opened on 30 September 2015, completing the Battersea project. It is named in honour of Sir Po-Shing and Lady Helen Woo, who have funded scholarships at the RCA since the 1990s. It accommodates the Ceramics & Glass and Jewellery & Metal programmes. The building's anodised aluminium gates were designed by alumnus Max Lamb.

In 2017, RCA White City became the third RCA campus, co-located with the BBC Media Village and accommodating the School of Communication, Animation and Digital Direction and Communication Design in buildings designed by Allies and Morrison.

== Courses ==
In 2013, the college offered postgraduate degrees in art and design to students from over 60 countries.

The RCA offers a graduate diploma pre-masters conversion programme, MA, MRes, MPhil and PhD degrees in twenty-eight subject areas, divided into four schools: architecture, arts & humanities, communication, and design. The history of design programme is in collaboration with the Victoria and Albert Museum; there are two double MA/MSc programmes with Imperial College London.

In addition to formal qualifications the RCA also offers Summer school and Executive education courses throughout the year. English for academic purposes (EAP) courses are offered to applicants who need to improve their academic English ability to meet the college's entry requirements.

In early 2019, the RCA announced the launch of its new GenerationRCA programme. GenerationRCA -among other initiatives- will also "inject science disciplines into the mix of creative disciplines traditionally on offer." The new programmes will include Environmental Architecture and Digital Direction; with future programmes centred on nano and soft robotics, computer science, and machine learning, material science and the circular economy.

== Rankings ==
In 2024, the RCA was placed first in the art and design subject area in the QS World University Rankings published by Quacquarelli Symonds for the tenth year in a row, with an overall score of 98.5/100. For the second consecutive year the RCA was also ranked first place in the History of Art category, which incorporates programmes teaching the history of design.

In August 2015, it was ranked first on a list of master's courses in fashion by Business of Fashion, a fashion website.

In April 2011, the RCA was ranked first on a list of UK graduate art schools compiled by Modern Painters magazine from a survey of professionals in the art world.

In the Research Assessment Exercise of December 2008, 40% of the research output of the school received the highest (4* or "world-leading") assessment, the third-highest rating in the art and design subject area; over all subject areas only about fifty institutions received a higher rating.

== International collaboration ==
The college is an active member of the University of the Arctic. UArctic is an international cooperative network based in the Circumpolar Arctic region, consisting of more than 200 universities, colleges, and other organizations with an interest in promoting education and research in the Arctic region.

The Royal College of Art also participates in UArctic's mobility program "north2north". The aim of that program is to enable students of member institutions to study in different parts of the North.

== Awards and prizes ==
The Royal College of Art has several awards and prizes which it confers on its graduating students. These include the Sheila Robinson Drawing Prize.

== Alumni ==
The Royal College of Art and its predecessor schools have numerous notable alumni.

Among those who studied in the RCA predecessor bodies in the nineteenth century were Sir George Clausen, Christopher Dresser, Sir Luke Fildes, Kate Greenaway, Gertrude Jekyll and Edwin Lutyens.

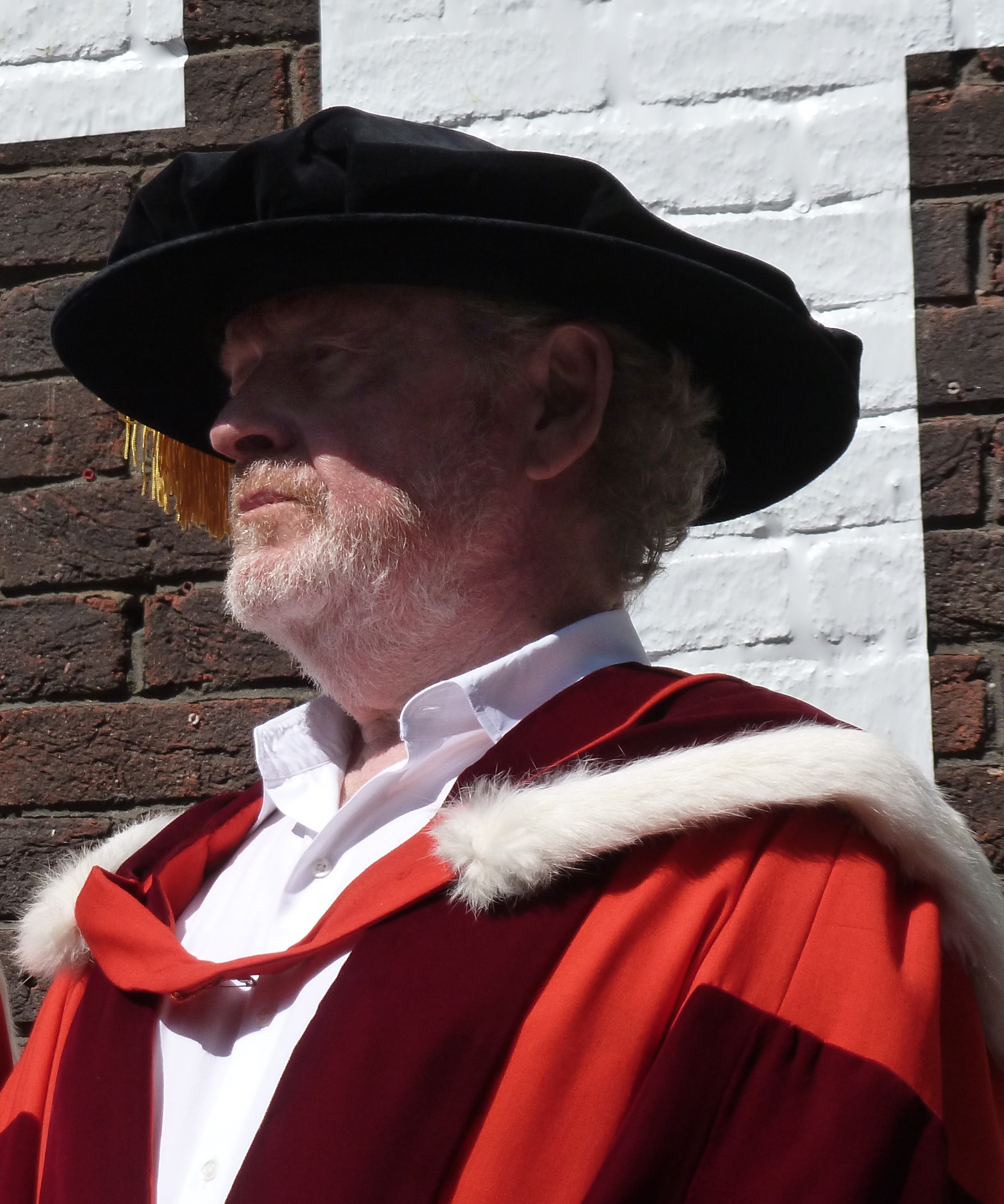
Alumnus Sir Ridley Scott being made an Honorary Doctor at the college during a ceremony in July 2015.

Alumni from the twentieth and twenty-first centuries include the sculptors Jean Gibson, Barbara Hepworth and Henry Moore, painters Frank Auerbach, Sir Peter Blake, Frank Bowling, David Hockney, Bridget Riley, Gavin Turk and Charles Tunnicliffe, artists Jake and Dinos Chapman, Tracey Emin and R. B. Kitaj, fashion designers Ossie Clark and Zandra Rhodes, industrial designers James Dyson, and David Mellor, film directors Tony and Ridley Scott, writer Travis Jeppesen, textile artist Nour Jaouda, designers Thomas Heatherwick and architect Sir David Adjaye, prominent member of the suffragette movement Sylvia Pankhurst, the musician Ian Dury, sound artist Janek Schaefer, and the actor Alan Rickman. The artist and graduate Gerald Holtom designed the CND symbol in 1958, which has become a nearly universal peace symbol.

The Royal College of Art Society amalgamated with OSARCA (the Old Students Association of the RCA 1912) for the benefit of graduates and associates of the Royal College of Art.

== Faculty ==
Academic and research staff include:

Neville Brody	Professor of Communication
Professor Johnny Golding	Professor of Philosophy & Fine Art
Nicky Hamlyn	Tutor, Visual Communication
Peter Kennard	Professor of Political Art
Rut Blees Luxemburg	Reader in Urban Aesthetics and Senior Research Fellow
Flora McLean	Senior Tutor, Fashion
Olivier Richon	Professor of Photography
Tai Shani	Tutor, Contemporary Art Practice

== See also ==
- Armorial of UK universities
- List of art universities and colleges in Europe
- List of universities in the UK
- Visual arts education
