= 2007 in Canada =

- Decades: 1980s; 1990s; 2000s; 2010s; 2020s
- See also: History of Canada; Timeline of Canadian history; List of years in Canada

Events from the year 2007 in Canada.

== Incumbents ==
=== Crown ===
- Monarch – Elizabeth II

=== Federal government ===
- Governor General – Michaëlle Jean
- Prime Minister – Stephen Harper
- Chief Justice – Beverley McLachlin (British Columbia)
- Parliament – 39th

=== Provincial governments ===
==== Lieutenant governors ====
- Lieutenant Governor of Alberta – Norman Kwong
- Lieutenant Governor of British Columbia – Iona Campagnolo (until October 1) then Steven Point
- Lieutenant Governor of Manitoba – John Harvard
- Lieutenant Governor of New Brunswick – Herménégilde Chiasson
- Lieutenant Governor of Newfoundland and Labrador – Edward Roberts
- Lieutenant Governor of Nova Scotia – Mayann Francis
- Lieutenant Governor of Ontario – James Bartleman (until September 5) then David Onley
- Lieutenant Governor of Prince Edward Island – Barbara Oliver Hagerman
- Lieutenant Governor of Quebec – Lise Thibault (until June 7) then Pierre Duchesne
- Lieutenant Governor of Saskatchewan – Gordon Barnhart

==== Premiers ====
- Premier of Alberta – Ed Stelmach
- Premier of British Columbia – Gordon Campbell
- Premier of Manitoba – Gary Doer
- Premier of New Brunswick – Shawn Graham
- Premier of Newfoundland and Labrador – Danny Williams
- Premier of Nova Scotia – Rodney MacDonald
- Premier of Ontario – Dalton McGuinty
- Premier of Prince Edward Island – Pat Binns (until June 12) then Robert Ghiz
- Premier of Quebec – Jean Charest
- Premier of Saskatchewan – Lorne Calvert (until November 21) then Brad Wall

=== Territorial governments ===
==== Commissioners ====
- Commissioner of Yukon – Geraldine Van Bibber
- Commissioner of Northwest Territories – Tony Whitford
- Commissioner of Nunavut – Ann Meekitjuk Hanson

==== Premiers ====
- Premier of the Northwest Territories – Joe Handley (until October 18) then Floyd Roland
- Premier of Nunavut – Paul Okalik
- Premier of Yukon – Dennis Fentie

== Events ==
=== January to March ===
- January 5 – The domed roof of BC Place Stadium in Vancouver collapses.
- January 11 – A major blizzard rips through Central Saskatchewan.
- January – The Quebec town of Hérouxville received international attention when its town council passed controversial measures concerning practices which the residents deemed unsuitable for life in Hérouxville for potential new immigrants, despite the fact that the town has no immigrant population. The mayor and the municipal council approved a code of behavior for immigrants, which occurred in the context of a debate on "reasonable accommodation" for other cultures in Quebec.
- February 3 – At a Calgary Flames game, young Cree singer Akina Shirt becomes the first person to perform "O Canada" in an Aboriginal language at a major league sporting event.
- February 8 – Ontario provincial by-election in Burlington; Markham; and York South–Weston electoral districts.
- February 19 – During a live interview on CKRS in Saguenay, Quebec, talk radio host Louis Champagne attacks Parti Québécois candidate Sylvain Gaudreault and leader André Boisclair, both openly gay, in an interview with PQ candidate Alexandre Cloutier, asking "In Jonquière, listen, aren't you going to face the question, 'Is the Parti Québécois a club of fags?'"
- February 20 – The Canadian government, along with American billionaire Bill Gates, announce the Canadian HIV Vaccine Initiative, a $139 million dollar plan to fight the AIDS virus.
- March 13 – Canada 2006 Census data is released; the population of Canada in 2006 was 31,612,897. Notably, the census also indicates that for the first time in Canadian history, the three territories (Yukon, Northwest Territories and Nunavut) have a combined population of over 100,000.
- March 26 – Quebec general election.

=== April to June ===
- April 3 – Royal assent is granted to the Veterans' Bill of Rights.
- April 27 – Three new Laval metro stations are inaugurated. (see Montreal Metro)
- April 30 – Prince Andrew, fourth in line to the Canadian throne, arrives in Canada to undertake duties in Halifax, Toronto and Cambridge
- May 3 – Fixed election dates introduced at the federal level.
- May 18 – Governor General Michaëlle Jean appoints Pierre Duchesne as Lieutenant Governor of Quebec
- May 22 – The general election in Manitoba is won by the governing New Democrats.
- May 23 – Jordan Manners is the first Torontonian killed in a school shooting.
- May 28 – Prince Edward Island election. Robert Ghiz's Liberals win a majority, defeating Premier Pat Binns' Progressive Conservatives
- June 2 – Prince Harry, third in line to the Canadian throne, arrives at CFB Suffield to train for a possible deployment to Afghanistan
- June 2 – Princess Anne arrives in Saskatchewan to undertake various official duties
- June 7 – Pierre Duchesne becomes Lieutenant Governor of Quebec, replacing Lise Thibault
- June 12 – Robert Ghiz becomes Premier of Prince Edward Island, replacing Pat Binns
- June 18 – Passenger Protect goes into effect
- June 22 – CTVglobemedia's takeover of CHUM Limited (excepting Citytv, which is slated for sale to Rogers Communications) is completed.
- June 29 – A national Aboriginal Day of Protest, including blockades of several major transportation routes in Ontario and Quebec, is held to protest the state of First Nations relations with the federal government.

=== July to September ===
- July 13 – Conrad Black is found guilty on three charges of fraud and one charge of obstruction of justice in Chicago.
- July 19 – Jesse Imeson begins a murderous rampage in Ontario, prompting an international manhunt.
- August – ditch, an on-line literary periodical is launched.
- August 8 – A suspect, Gaétan Bissonnette, was arrested in relation to the business Denise Morelle, an actress who was murdered in Montreal in 1984. He later pleaded guilty to murder.
- August 11 – World War 2 veteran James Silcox becomes the first victim of serial killer nurse Elizabeth Wettlaufer in Woodstock, Ontario. Wettlaufer murdered her patients by injecting them with fatal doses of insulin.
- August 20 – First incident of severed feet finding on British Columbia coast.
- August 23 – Quebec Provincial Police admit to inserting "agents provocateurs" into the group protesting against the Montebello meeting.
- August 28 – Steven Truscott is acquitted by the Court of Appeal for Ontario in a hearing to review his 1959 conviction for the murder of Lynne Harper.
- September 5 – The Governor General appoints David Onley as Lieutenant Governor of Ontario, replacing James Bartleman
- September 11 – Stephen Harper becomes the first Canadian Prime Minister since Confederation to address the Parliament of Australia.
- September 17 – Three by-elections in Quebec in Roberval—Lac-Saint-Jean, Saint-Hyacinthe—Bagot, and Outremont.

=== October to December ===
- October 1 – General election in Northwest Territories.
- October 1 – The Governor General appoints Steven Point as Lieutenant Governor of British Columbia, replacing Iona Campagnolo
- October 9 – The general election in Newfoundland and Labrador is won by the governing Progressive Conservatives.
- October 9 – A series of small earthquakes start in the British Columbia Interior that expressed interest in the adjacent 7,200-year-old Nazko Cone.
- October 10 – The general election in Ontario is won by the governing Liberals.
- October 13 – Roger Duguay is chosen as the new leader of the New Brunswick New Democratic Party at the party's leadership convention.
- October 14 – The Royal Canadian Mounted Police (RCMP) taser a man, who died shortly thereafter, at the Vancouver Airport. The incident is videotaped and eventually released to the public.
- October 17 – Floyd Roland is selected as the new Premier of the Northwest Territories.
- October 19 – In Surrey, British Columbia, six people are murdered in a highrise apartment. Chris Mohan, and Ed Schellenburg, were innocent victims in the murder. The other four were drug dealers. This is known as the Surrey Six slayings.
- October 25 – The Government of Canada announces the creation of the Lake Superior National Marine Conservation Area, the largest freshwater marine protected area in the world.
- October 31 – The Conservative Party of Canada drops Mark Warner as its candidate in the pending Toronto Centre byelection, citing unspecified differences.
- October 31 – Rogers Communications officially takes ownership of Citytv.
- November 1 – A provincewide Amber alert is issued in Ontario after a newborn baby is abducted from the Sudbury Regional Hospital in Greater Sudbury. A Kirkland Lake resident, Brenda Batisse, is arrested later the same evening; the baby is recovered safely.
- November 7 – The general election in Saskatchewan is won by the opposition Saskatchewan Party.
- November 21 – Brad Wall is sworn in as Premier of Saskatchewan, succeeding Lorne Calvert.
- November 30 – A fire destroys much of the beachfront shopping area in the resort town of Wasaga Beach, Ontario.

== Arts and literature ==
=== Music ===
- March 30 – Final concert by influential Canadian rock band Rheostatics.

=== New books ===
- Todd Babiak, The Book of Stanley
- David Chariandy, Soucouyant
- Barbara Fradkin, Dream Chasers
- Barbara Gowdy, Helpless
- Don Hannah, Ragged Islands
- Nalo Hopkinson, The New Moon's Arms
- Naomi Klein, The Shock Doctrine
- Bob Mersereau, The Top 100 Canadian Albums
- Michael Ondaatje, Divisadero
- M. G. Vassanji, The Assassin's Song
- Michael Winter, The Architects Are Here
- Alissa York, Effigy

==== Literary awards ====
- Heather O'Neill's 2006 novel Lullabies for Little Criminals wins the 2007 edition of Canada Reads
- Barbara Fradkin's 2006 novel Honour Among Men wins the 2007 Arthur Ellis Award for Best Novel
- Elizabeth Hay's 2007 novel Late Nights on Air wins the 2007 Scotiabank Giller Prize
- 2007 Governor General's Awards: TBA

== Sport ==
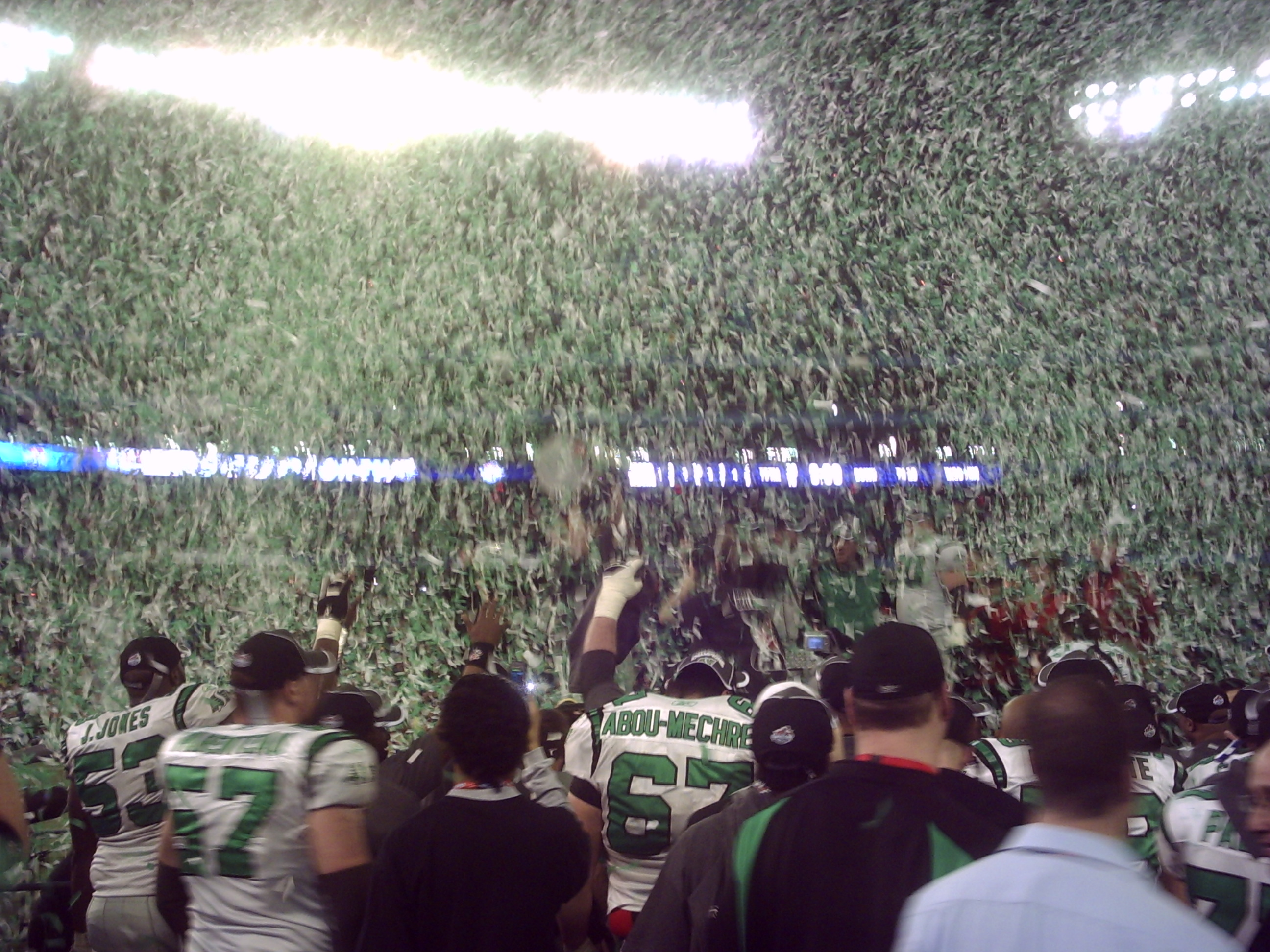
The Saskatchewan Roughriders celebrate their Grey Cup victory

- January 9–15 – 2007 Canadian Figure Skating Championships
  - Men's medalists – Jeffrey Buttle, Gold; Christopher Mabee, Silver; Emanuel Sandhu, Bronze.
  - Women's medalists – Joannie Rochette, Gold; Mira Leung, Silver; Lesley Hawker, Bronze.
  - Pairs' medalists – Jessica Dubé / Bryce Davison, Gold; Valérie Marcoux / Craig Buntin, Silver; Anabelle Langlois / Cody Hay, Bronze.
  - Dance medalists – Marie-France Dubreuil / Patrice Lauzon, Gold; Tessa Virtue / Scott Moir, Silver; Kaitlyn Weaver / Andrew Poje, Bronze.
- January 14 – Toronto's Christian Cage (Jay Reso) wins his second NWA World Heavyweight Championship by defeating Abyss (Chris Parks) at the TNA Impact! Zone in Orlando at Total Nonstop Action's Genesis 2006
- March 23 – Marie-France Dubreuil / Patrice Lauzon wins the silver medal in Ice Dancing at the World Figure Skating Championships in Tokyo.
- May 13 – Cage is awarded the first TNA Heavyweight Championship when Total Nonstop Action severs ties with National Wrestling Alliance
- May 27 – The Vancouver Giants wins their first Memorial Cup by defeating the Medicine Hat Tigers 3 to 1. The tournament was played at the Pacific Coliseum in Vancouver
- June 6 – The Anaheim Ducks win their first Stanley Cup by defeating the Ottawa Senators 4 games to 1. Edmonton's Scott Niedermayer was awarded the Conn Smythe Trophy
- July 22 – Argentina wins the FIFA U-20 World Cup after defeating the Czech Republic 2–1 in the final game played at the BMO Field in Toronto
- November 23 – The Manitoba Bisons win their third Vanier Cup by defeating the Saint Mary's Huskies by a score of 28 to 14 in the 43rd Vanier Cup played at the Rogers Centre in Toronto
- November 25 – The Saskatchewan Roughriders win their third (and first since 1989) Grey Cup by defeating the Winnipeg Blue Bombers 23 to 19 in the 95th Grey Cup played at the Rogers Centre in Toronto. Chatham, Ontario's Andy Fantuz is named the game's Most Valuable Canadian

== Births ==
- January 21 – Kennedi Clements, child actress
- July 29 – Lil Tay, rapper

== Deaths ==
=== January to March ===
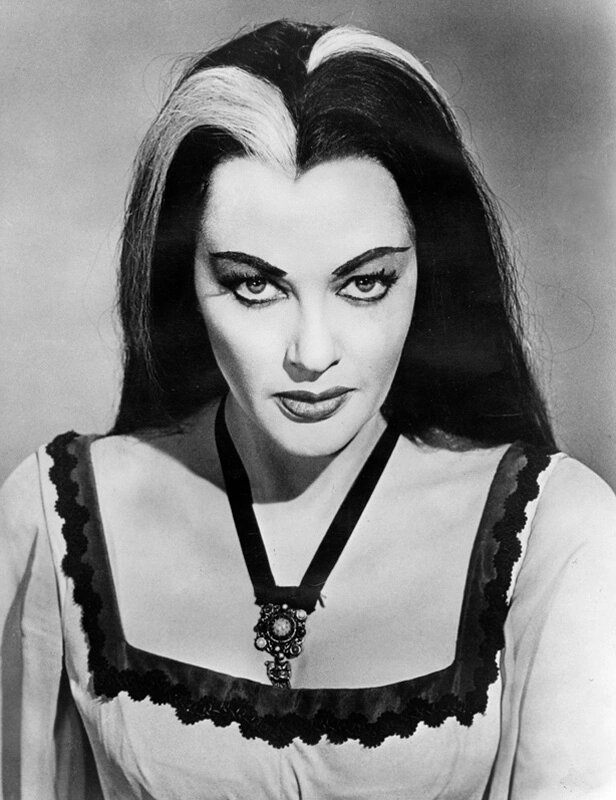
Yvonne De Carlo died January 8

- January 3 – Earl Reibel, ice hockey player (born 1930)
- January 6 – Charmion King, actress (born 1925)
- January 8 – Yvonne De Carlo, actress, dancer and singer (born 1922)
- January 15
  - James Hillier, scientist and inventor, jointly designed and built first electron microscope (born 1915)
  - Percy Saltzman, meteorologist and television personality, first English-speaking weatherman in Canadian television history (born 1915)
- January 18 – Julie Winnefred Bertrand, supercentenarian, oldest living Canadian and oldest verified living recognized woman at the time of her death (born 1891)
- January 19 – Denny Doherty, singer and songwriter (born 1940)
- January 20
  - Cyril Lloyd Francis, politician and Speaker of the House of Commons of Canada (born 1920)
  - Richard Vollenweider, limnologist (born 1922)
- January 26 – Gump Worsley, ice hockey player (born 1929)
- February 14 – Ryan Larkin, animator, artist and sculptor (born 1943)
- February 17 – Dermot O'Reilly, musician, producer and songwriter (born 1942)
- February 19 – Celia Franca, ballet dancer and founder and artistic director of the National Ballet of Canada (born 1921)
- February 27 – Myron Wolf Child, youth activist, public speaker and politician (born 1983)
- March 2 – Doris Anderson, author, journalist and women's rights activist (born 1925)
- March 10 – Fleurette Beauchamp-Huppé, pianist, soprano and teacher (born 1907)
- March 19 – Renée Maheu, biographer, journalist and soprano (born 1929)
- March 23 – Agnes Benidickson, first female chancellor of Queen's University at Kingston, Ontario (born 1920)

=== April to June ===
- April 10 – Charles Philippe Leblond, pioneer of cell biology and stem cell research (born 1910)
- April 14 – June Callwood, journalist, author and social activist (born 1924)
- April 23 – Jim Walding, politician (born 1937)
- April 28
  - Lloyd Crouse, businessman, politician and Lieutenant Governor of Nova Scotia (born 1918)
  - Bertha Wilson, jurist and first female Puisne Justice of the Supreme Court of Canada (born 1923)
- May 7 – Myfanwy Pavelic, artist (born 1916)
- June 15 – Richard Bell, musician (born 1946)
- June 21 – Peter Liba, journalist and Lieutenant-Governor of Manitoba (born 1940)
- June 24 – Chris Benoit, wrestler (born 1967)
- June 27 – William Hutt, actor (born 1920)

=== July to September ===
- July 11
  - Ed Mirvish, businessman, philanthropist and theatrical impresario (born 1914)
  - Jimmy Skinner, ice hockey coach (born 1917)
- July 15 – Bluma Appel, philanthropist and patron of the arts (b. c1920)
- July 31 – Margaret Avison, poet (born 1918)
- August 17 – Elmer MacFadyen, politician (born 1943)
- August 22 – Gilles Beaudoin, politician and mayor of Trois-Rivières (born 1919)
- August 23 – William John McKeag, politician and Lieutenant-Governor of Manitoba (born 1928)
- August 24 – Andrée Boucher, politician and 39th Mayor of Quebec City (born 1937)
- September 8 – George Crum, conductor, pianist, vocal coach and musical arranger (born 1926)
- September 23 – Ken Danby, artist (born 1940)

=== October to December ===
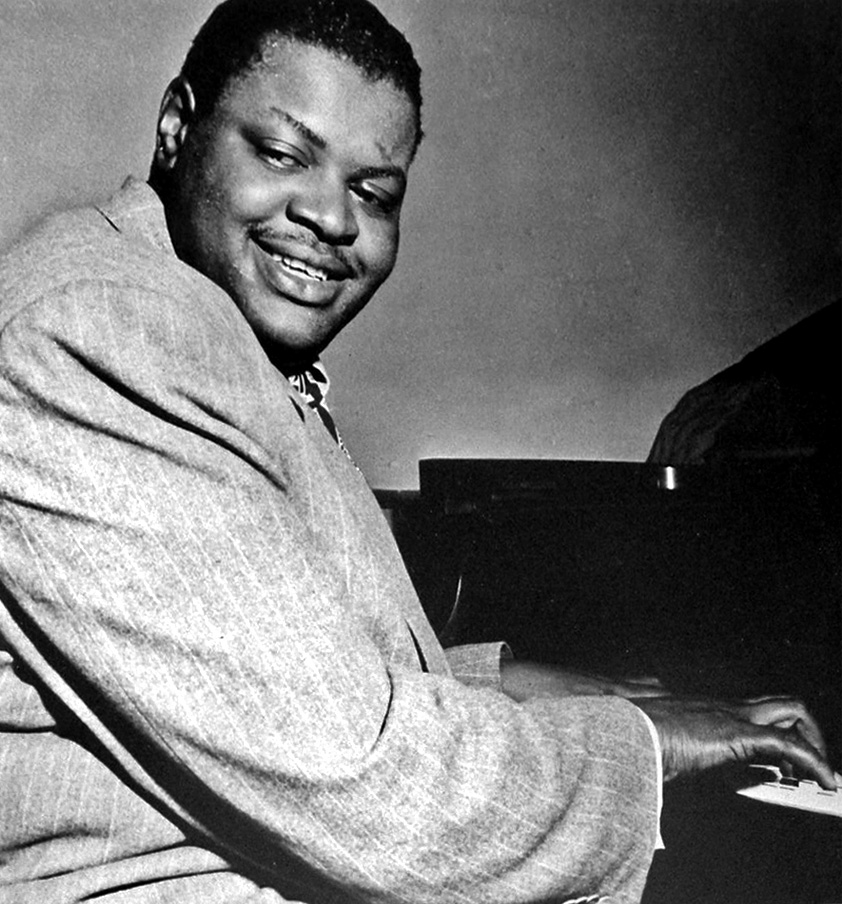
Oscar Peterson died December 23

- October 24 – David Adams, ballet dancer (born 1928)
- October 30 – Robert Goulet, singer and actor (born 1933)
- November 21 – Tom Johnson, sports executive and hockey player (born 1928)
- November 24 – Antonio Lamer, lawyer, jurist and 16th Chief Justice of Canada (born 1933)
- November 25 – Neil Hope, actor (born 1972)
- November 27 – Jane Rule, novelist and non-fiction writer (born 1931)
- November 29 – James Barber, cookbook author and television chef (born 1923)
- December 4 – Norval Morrisseau, artist (born 1932)
- December 10 – Aqsa Parvez, murder victim (born 1991)
- December 23 – Oscar Peterson, jazz pianist and composer (born 1925)

== See also ==
- 2007 in Canadian music
- 2007 in Canadian television
- List of Canadian films of 2007
