= Algeria, Unspoken Stories =

2007 Algerian documentary film

- French: Algérie, histoires à ne pas dire
- Directed by: Jean-Pierre Lledó
- Screenplay by: Jean-Pierre Lledó
- Produced by: Naouel Films, 1001 Productions
- Cinematography: Othmane Abbane
- Edited by: Kathena Attia
- Music by: Hayyet Ayad
- Release date: September 2007 (TIFF)
- Running time: 155 minutes
- Countries: Algeria; France

Algeria, Unspoken Stories (French: Algérie, histoires à ne pas dire) is a 2007 documentary film. The film showed at the 2007 Toronto International Film Festival.

== Synopsis ==
When independence is declared in 1962, the minority communities of Jewish and European origin flee Algeria. Four people of Muslim ascendency searching for the truth about their own lives evoke the last decades of French colonization, the years of war, from 1955 to 1962. Hatred and friendship lead us through a hidden memory: their relationships with their Jewish and Christian neighbours. The foundational myths of the new Algeria are revisited, but will they succeed in getting to the bottom of their own legends?
