= Beatrice Munah Sieh Brown =

Liberian police official

Inspector General of the Liberia National Police
- In office 2006–2009
- President: Ellen Johnson Sirleaf
- Succeeded by: Marc Amblard

Personal details
- Born: Beatrice Munah Sieh
- Citizenship: Liberian
- Occupation: Police official, educator

Beatrice Munah Sieh Brown, also known as Beatrice Munah Sieh, is a Liberian teacher and police officer. She was the Inspector-General of Liberia from 2006 to 2009.

== Career ==
Sieh became a policewoman in Liberia, moving up the ranks from motorcycle cop to presidential escort to Deputy Director of Police Operations. She served for 18 years before civil war broke out in 1996.

Sieh moved to the United States where she became a special education teacher in 1997. In 2000, she got a job at Grace Dunn Middle School in Trenton, New Jersey.

In 2006, she was appointed the chief of police of Liberia by President Ellen Johnson Sirleaf.

In 2007, she was one of the subjects of Iron Ladies of Liberia, a documentary about Sirleaf's election and her record appointment of women to top positions in government.

In February 2013, Sieh was charged with stealing $200,000. She was indicted on charges of economic sabotage, theft of property, criminal facilitation and criminal conspiracy and plead not guilty. She was found guilty in March 2013. The conviction was described as controversial. In April, the conviction was overturned and a new trial ordered.

== Personal life ==
Sieh was born about 1957. She has 3 adult children.

Political offices
Preceded by	Inspector General of the Liberia National Police; 2006–2009	Succeeded by Marc Amblard
