= 2007 in Canadian television =

This is a list of Canadian television related events from 2007.

== Events ==
A series of ownership changes radically reshaped the Canadian television broadcasting industry in 2007. Individual transactions are briefly noted below; for more information, see also 2007 Canada broadcast TV realignment.

Date	Event
March 5	Cable channel Life Network is rebranded as the iconic women's lifestyle channel Slice.
April 4	After 54 years Country Canada is cancelled by CBC.
April 9	Rogers Communications announces a takeover offer for CHUM Limited's A-Channel stations, which CTVglobemedia had announced an intention to sell as part of its own acquisition of CHUM. This deal is later voided when the CRTC forces CTV to divest itself of Citytv, rather than A-Channel, in its approval of the CHUM deal.
May 22	CTV acquires Canadian broadcast rights to National Football League games, including the Super Bowl. These were previously held by Global.
June 8	The CRTC approves CTVglobemedia's takeover of CHUM Limited, inclusive of the A-Channel system and all of CHUM's specialty channels, but conditional on CTV divesting itself of the Citytv stations. In separate decisions, the CRTC also licenses new Omni Television and Crossroads Television System stations in Calgary and Edmonton.
June 12	Rogers Communications announces a CA$375 million takeover offer for the Citytv stations.
August 10	Launch of the new premium pay-per-view channel, Setanta Sports.
September 7	CH stations to be rebranded as E! Canada, offering programming predominantly sourced from the American E! cable network.
September 10	Brian Melo is named winner of the fifth season of Canadian Idol.
September 28	The CRTC approves Rogers Communications' takeover offer for Citytv. In a separate decision, the CRTC also approves Astral Media's acquisition of Standard Broadcasting, inclusive of the television stations CFTK and CJDC.
October 1	Corus Entertainment and Astral Media launch Teletoon Retro. Both companies each own 50%.
October 22	Rogers confirms that it will move its broadcast television operations in Toronto (CITY, CFMT and CJMT) to 35 Dundas Street East, the former Olympic Spirit building on Sankofa Square (then Yonge-Dundas Square).
October 28	2007 Gemini Awards.
November 30	Playhouse Disney Channel launches in Canada, as a multiplex channel of Family.
December 5	Mathieu Surprenant wins the fourth season of Loft Story.

=== Debuts (including scheduled) ===
See 2007–08 Canadian network television schedule for a complete grid of the networks' fall prime time programming.

Show	Station	Premiere Date
Taxi 0-22	TVA	January 5
Mixed Blessings	APTN	January 5
The Land Before Time	YTV	January 5
Little Mosque on the Prairie	CBC	January 9
La Job	SRC	January 11
Le Banquier	TVA	January 24
Deal or No Deal Canada	Global	February 4
Chaotic	Teletoon	March 16
Chop Socky Chooks	Teletoon	March 16
Test the Nation	CBC	March 18
Durham County	The Movie Network/Movie Central	May 7
The Best Years	Global	May 22
Storm Hawks	YTV	May 25
George of the Jungle	Teletoon	June 22
Moose TV	Showcase	July 5
Total Drama Island	Teletoon	July 8
Ricky Sprocket: Showbiz Boy	Teletoon	August 31
Grand Star	Space/A-Channel	September 22
Lily's Life	YTV	September 25
Les Soeurs Elliot	TVA	September 26
Les Boys	SRC	October 1
The Tudors	CBC	October 2
No Opportunity Wasted	CBC	October 3
Triple Sensation	CBC	October 7
Project Runway Canada	Slice	October 8
Who Do You Think You Are?	CBC	October 11
Heartland	CBC	October 14
Da Kink in My Hair	Global	October 14
Rabbit Fall	Space, APTN	November 9
Caution: May Contain Nuts	APTN	November 10
The List	Slice	November 13
Across the River to Motor City	Citytv	November 22

=== Ending this year ===
Show	Station	Cancelled
Design Rivals	HGTV	January 16
On the Road Again	CBC Television	January 25
Jozi-H	CBC Television	February 2
What's with Andy	Teletoon	March 4
Country Canada	CBC Television	April 4
Call for Help	G4techTV Canada	April 7
Falcon Beach	Global	April 20
The Gill Deacon Show	CBC Television	May 30
Life and Times	CBC Television	June 22
Naturally, Sadie	Family	August 26
CFL on CBC	CBC Television	November 25
Le Cœur a ses raisons	TVA	December 3
Intelligence	CBC Television	December 10
Rumours	CBC Television	Unknown
Venture	CBC Television	Unknown

== TV movies ==
- Booky and the Secret Santa (CBC Television, December 11)
- Crazy Canucks (CTV, December 15)
- In God's Country (CTV, January)
- Luna: Spirit of the Whale (CTV, May 13)
- St. Urbain's Horseman (CBC Television, October)

== See also ==
- 2007 in Canada
- List of Canadian films of 2007
