= Dust Bowl Ha! Ha! =

2007 Canadian film

- Directed by: Sébastien Pilote
- Written by: Sébastien Pilote
- Starring: André Bouchard; Gérald Pilote; Jean Wauthier
- Cinematography: Sébastien Pilote; Guillaume Tremblay
- Music by: Pierre Lapointe
- Release date: 2007
- Running time: 14 minutes
- Country: Canada
- Language: French

Dust Bowl Ha! Ha! is a Canadian short film, directed by Sébastien Pilote and released in 2007. The film stars André Bouchard as a man in the Saguenay–Lac-Saint-Jean region who has just lost his job after the closure of his employer, as he goes about his first day without the stable and predictable structure of a normal work day.

The cast also includes Gérald Pilote and Jean Wauthier.

The film premiered at the 2007 Locarno Film Festival, and had its Canadian premiere at the 2007 Toronto International Film Festival.

The film was named to the Toronto International Film Festival's year-end Canada's Top Ten list for short films in 2007. It won the awards for best short film at the 2007 Festival Internacional de Cortometrajes de Barcelona, the 2007 Festival du nouveau cinéma, and the 2008 Rendez-vous du cinéma québécois, and was a Jutra Award nominee for Best Live Action Short Film at the 10th Jutra Awards in 2008.
