= A Promise to the Dead: The Exile Journey of Ariel Dorfman =

- Directed by: Peter Raymont
- Based on: Heading South, Looking North by Ariel Dorfman
- Produced by: Peter Raymont
- Starring: Ariel Dorfman
- Cinematography: Mark Ellam
- Edited by: Michèle Hozer
- Music by: Mark Korven
- Production company: White Pine Pictures
- Distributed by: Film Transit International
- Release date: September 8, 2007 (TIFF)
- Running time: 91 minutes
- Country: Canada
- Languages: English; Spanish

A Promise to the Dead: The Exile Journey of Ariel Dorfman is a 2007 Canadian documentary film directed by Peter Raymont. The film is based on the 1998 memoir Heading South, Looking North by long-exiled Chilean writer and human rights activist Ariel Dorfman, and profiles him during a trip back to his homeland.

The film's production, initially slated for early 2006, was delayed by the illness and death of Raymont's wife, Lindalee Tracey. Raymont almost dropped out of the film, before deciding that having a project to work on would help him process his grief. The film had its theatrical premiere at the 2007 Toronto International Film Festival, and was broadcast on television by Bravo in February 2008.

The film was named to the initial longlist for the Academy Award for Best Documentary Feature, but did not make the final shortlist. It was named to TIFF's annual year-end Canada's Top Ten list for 2007, and won the Donald Brittain Award at the 23rd Gemini Awards.
