= Vincent-Guillaume Otis =

Canadian actor

- Born: April 13, 1978 (age 48)
- Occupation: actor
- Years active: 2000s-present
- Notable work: District 31, Babine, Gabrielle
- Spouse: Éveline Gélinas

Vincent-Guillaume Otis (born April 13, 1978) is a Canadian actor from Quebec. He is most noted for his roles in the television series District 31, for which he won the Prix Gémeaux for Best Actor in a Drama Series in 2018, and the film Norbourg, for which he won the Prix Iris for Best Actor at the 24th Quebec Cinema Awards in 2022.

He received two prior Jutra Award nominations for Best Actor at the 11th Jutra Awards in 2009 for the film Babine, and Best Supporting Actor at the 16th Jutra Awards in 2004 for Gabrielle.

He is married to actress Éveline Gélinas.

== Filmography ==
=== Film ===
Year	Title	Role	Notes
2005	The Outlander (Le Survenant)	Vincent Provençal	
2006	Le Silence nous fera écho	Philippe	
2006	The Little Book of Revenge (Guide de la petite vengeance)	Protesting student	
2007	Code 13	Cyclist	
2008	The Necessities of Life (Ce qu'il faut pour vivre)	Joseph	
2008	The Deserter (Le Déserteur)	Armand	
2008	Babine	Babine	Jutra Award nominee for Best Actor
2009	Dragon's Teeth	Boyfriend	
2013	Gabrielle	Rémi	Jutra Award nomination for Best Supporting Actor
2013	Summer Crisis (La Maison du pêcheur)	Paul Rose	
2016	Wild Run: The Legend (Chasse-galerie)	Romain Boisjoli	
2022	Norbourg	Éric Asselin	
2024	Blue Sky Jo (La petite et le vieux)	Hélène's father	

=== Television ===
Year	Title	Role	Notes
2006	Kif-Kif	Antoine Johnson	
2006	René Lévesque	Paul Rose	
2006	Marie-Antoinette	Charles, comte d'Artois	Canadian television film by Francis Leclerc and Yves Simoneau
2010	Musée Eden	Louis Morin	
2012	Apparences	Samuel	
2014	Mensonges	Eddy Beaudry	
2014-16	Série noire	Patrick	
2017-18	Ruptures	Étienne Dalphand	
2016-22	District 31	Patrick Bissonnette	Prix Gémeaux for Best Actor in a Drama Series, 2018
2024–present	Les Armes	Lt. Col Louis-Philippe Savard	
