= Siatta Scott Johnson =

Liberian filmmaker and a broadcast journalist

Siatta Scott Johnson سياتا سكوت جونسون
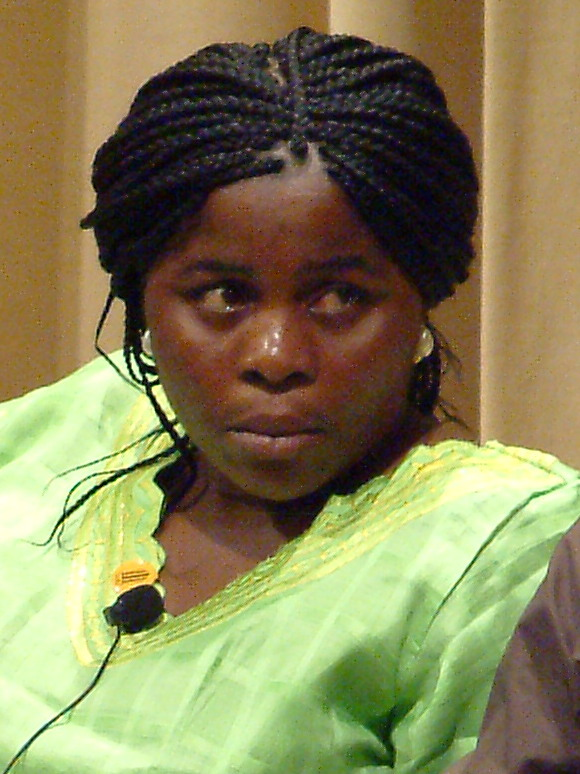
- Johnson in 2007
- Born: Siatta Scott Johnson; 1974 (age 51–52); Buchanan, Liberia
- Education: University of Liberia
- Occupations: Director, producer, broadcast journalist, reporter, presenter
- Years active: 2004–present

Siatta Scott Johnson (Arabic: سياتا سكوت جونسون; born 1974), is a Liberian filmmaker and a broadcast journalist. She is best known as the director of critically acclaimed documentary Iron Ladies of Liberia. Apart from direction, she is also a reporter, producer. She also is a founding member of Omuahtee Africa Media.

== Personal life ==
She was born in 1974 in Buchanan, Liberia. She was then raised in rural Grand Bassa County. In the early 1990s, Johnson fled from Grand Bassa with the outbreak of war. Later she settled in Monrovia during the end of the civil war in 2003.

When the schools reopened after war, Johnson completed her Bachelor of Arts degree in mass communications from the University of Liberia. Then, she took certificates in political reporting from the University of Liberia and later in media from the Press Union of Liberia and United Nations Mission in Liberia (UNMIL). She also holds a diploma in journalism from the Liberia Institute of Journalism. She also worked as a reporter and producer at Downtown Community Television Center (DCTV).

== Career ==
In 2007, she made the critically acclaimed documentary Iron Ladies of Liberia co-directed with Daniel Junge. The documentary honored at Dallas International Film Festival, Target Ten Filmmaker as the Best Documentary of that year and became the Best Film from One World for Schools at One World Film Festival held in Prague. Other than that, the film also represented in several international film festivals.

Apart from cinema, she is a popular journalist in Liberia where she worked with Female Journalist Association of Liberia (FeJAL). She also worked in Beyondmedia Education in Chicago, USA. After returned to Liberia, Johnson worked on building the media literacy of Liberian youth. Then she worked as the media advocate for the Norwegian Refugee Council (NRC) where she organized radio programs for rural women under a project called the “WISE WOMEN”. She also worked with Medica Mondiale Liberia as Communication Officer where she facilitate behavioral change among rural women living in Southeastern Liberia. Johnson became a producer for a television program called 'Voices That Matter' which was a program for teenage and adolescent girls.

In 2012, she became the CEO and Creative Director at Smart Media Liberia. In 2019, she was re-elected as the president Female Journalist Association of Liberia.

== Filmography ==
| Year | Film | Role | Genre | Ref. |
|---|---|---|---|---|
| 2007 | Iron Ladies of Liberia | Director | Documentary | |
| 2008 | Independent Lens | Director, camera operator | TV series | |
