= Hannes Schüpbach =

Swiss filmmaker and painter

Hannes Schüpbach is a Swiss filmmaker and painter, born in city of Winterthur, Switzerland in 1965.

== Education ==
Schüpbach studied visual art at the academies of art and design in Zurich (Hochschule für Gestaltung) and in Basel (Hochschule für Gestaltung und Kunst) from 1988 to 1991. In 1992, he dedicated six months to cinema and performance studies at New York University. During his education two figures were very important for their influence on the artist's cinematic language: Werner von Mutzenbecher and André Lehmann. They were his professors and both engaged in experimental film movement in Basel in the 1970s and 1980s.

== Career ==
In 1999 Schüpbach established "Film direkt", a monthly series of artists' films at Filmpodium Zurich, where some publications on the art film were also issued. Hannes Schüpbach has become internationally known with his 16mm films, which he has presented in some of the most important European art institutions: Centre Pompidou, Paris; Biennale de l'Image en Mouvement, Geneva; Museum Reina Sofia, Madrid; Tate Modern, London.

From the first years of his artistic career, Schüpbach also worked as painter, creating "large, connected series of paintings". During his first solo exhibition, "Stills and Movies" at Kunsthalle Basel in 2009, a combination of his paintings and films was presented. The Kunsthalle Basel exhibition website states "both media are inseparably connected in his approach to his work. The films and the paintings are two idioms that Schüpbach adopts to articulate the major themes of his artistic work: the representation of time and movement and the complex processes of experiencing and remembering".
