= The Schoolyard =

- French: Les Grands
- Directed by: Chloé Leriche
- Written by: Chloé Leriche
- Produced by: Christine Falco
- Starring: Robert Naylor; Jean-Carl Boucher; Antoine Marcotte
- Cinematography: John Ashmore
- Edited by: Clovis Gouaillier; Vincent Riendeau
- Music by: Stéphane Boucher
- Production company: Films Camera Oscura
- Distributed by: Netima
- Release date: September 11, 2007 (TIFF)
- Running time: 12 minutes
- Country: Canada
- Language: French

The Schoolyard (French: Les Grands) is a Canadian short film, directed and written by Chloé Leriche and released in 2007. The film stars Robert Naylor, Jean-Carl Boucher and Antoine Marcotte as Tommy, Manu and Fabrice, three young boys who decide to confront their school bully, only to discover his hidden reasons for bullying others.

The film premiered at the 2007 Toronto International Film Festival. It was later named to TIFF's annual year-end Canada's Top Ten list of the year's best Canadian short films.
