= Late Fragment =

- Directed by: Daryl Cloran; Anita Doron; Mateo Guez
- Written by: Daryl Cloran; Anita Doron; Mateo Guez
- Produced by: Ana Serrano; Anita Lee
- Starring: Krista Bridges; Michael Healey; Jeffrey Parazzo
- Cinematography: Francois Dagenais
- Edited by: Roslyn Kaloo
- Music by: David Wall
- Distributed by: National Film Board of Canada
- Release date: 2007
- Country: Canada
- Language: English

Late Fragment is a 2007 Canadian interactive cinema production, written and directed by Daryl Cloran, Anita Doron and Mateo Guez. It is North America's first interactive feature film. The project is a co-production of Canadian Film Centre and the National Film Board of Canada.

== Plot ==
Three strangers lives are fractured by thoughts and acts of seething violence. In this interactive feature film, viewers unravel their interlocked stories with a simple click.

== Festivals ==
Late Fragment had its world premiere at the 2007 Toronto International Film Festival and screened next at Montreal's Festival du Nouveau Cinéma.
