= Pool (film) =

- Indonesian: Kolam
- Directed by: Chris Chong Chan Fui
- Produced by: Chris Chong Chan Fui
- Cinematography: Chris Chong Chan Fui
- Edited by: Alvi Apriayandi; Taufik Arifianto
- Release date: September 7, 2007 (TIFF)
- Running time: 14 minutes
- Country: Canada
- Language: Acehnese

Pool (Indonesian: Kolam) is a Malaysian-Canadian short film, directed by Chris Chong Chan Fui and released in 2007. The film depicts a group of children playing in a swimming pool in Aceh, Indonesia, working through their fear of water following the 2004 Indian Ocean earthquake and tsunami.

The film premiered in the Wavelengths program at the 2007 Toronto International Film Festival, where it won the award for Best Canadian Short Film. It was later named to TIFF's annual year-end Canada's Top Ten list of the year's best Canadian short films.
