= Nicky Hamlyn =

British experimental filmmaker and academic

- Born: 1954 (age 71–72); London, England
- Education: Christ's Hospital; University of Reading (BA)
- Occupations: Experimental filmmaker, author, academic
- Employer(s): University for the Creative Arts; Royal College of Art
- Known for: Structural film

Nicky Hamlyn (born 1954) is a British experimental filmmaker, author, and academic. He works in structural film, focusing on time, frame relations, movement, and light.

== Early life and education ==
Hamlyn was born in London in 1954. He attended Christ's Hospital school in Horsham, Sussex. He studied fine art at the University of Reading, graduating with a Bachelor of Arts in 1976.

== Career ==
From 1979 to 1981, Hamlyn served as workshop organiser for the London Film-Makers' Co-op. From 1981 to 1988, he worked as a freelance dubbing editor for BBC TV and Channel 4.

In 1988, Hamlyn became a lecturer in video media arts and visual theory at the Kent Institute of Art & Design (KIAD). Following KIAD's merger into the University for the Creative Arts (UCA), he moved to the Canterbury campus, where he became professor of experimental film. He also taught as a lecturer in visual communication at the Royal College of Art in London.

== Filmmaking and exhibitions ==
Hamlyn has completed over 60 films, videos, installation works, and multi-projector performances since 1974. His work often uses frame-by-frame animation to document landscapes, urban spaces, and domestic interiors.

His films have screened at the Royal College of Art, the New York Film Festival, and the Toronto International Film Festival. He has held solo exhibitions at San Francisco Cinematheque, the Berkeley Art Museum and Pacific Film Archive, and Double Negative in Montreal.

In 2008, Hamlyn exhibited work alongside director Andrew Kötting at the George Rodger Gallery in Maidstone, Kent. In November 2009, he participated in the joint exhibition 5-9 with photographer Sebastian Edge at Unit B9 in The Powerhub in Medway. In March 2018, he exhibited work in the group show Interval [ ] still : now at Tintype Gallery in London.

== Publications ==
Hamlyn wrote Film Art Phenomena, published by BFI Publishing in 2003. He co-edited Kurt Kren: Structural Films (2016) with Simon Payne and A. L. Rees, and co-edited, with Vicky Smith, Experimental and Expanded Animation: New Perspectives and Practices (2018). He has contributed articles and reviews to Film Quarterly, MIRAJ, Public, Senses of Cinema, and Millennium Film Journal, for which he serves on the editorial board.
