= Code 13 =

2007 Canadian short film

- Directed by: Mathieu Denis
- Written by: Mathieu Denis
- Produced by: Pascal Bascaron; Sylvain Corbeil
- Starring: Roc Lafortune; Vincent-Guillaume Otis
- Cinematography: Serge Desrosiers
- Edited by: Pascale Paroissien
- Music by: Robert Marcel Lepage
- Production company: Metafilms
- Release date: September 10, 2007 (TIFF)
- Running time: 16 minutes
- Country: Canada
- Language: French

Code 13 is a Canadian dramatic short film, directed by Mathieu Denis and released in 2007. The film stars Roc Lafortune as Joseph, a taxi driver on the night shift in Montreal who becomes drawn into a violent confrontation with a cyclist (Vincent-Guillaume Otis) after accidentally hitting the man with his car.

The cast also includes Paul Dion, Patrice Dussault and Marie-France Marcotte.

The film premiered at the 2007 Toronto International Film Festival. It was later screened at the 2008 Fantasia Film Festival, where Denis won the award for best director of a short film in the festival program. It was named to TIFF's annual year-end Canada's Top Ten list for 2007.
