= Farmer's Requiem =

2007 Canadian film

- Directed by: Ramses Madina
- Written by: Ramses Madina
- Produced by: Ramses Madina
- Narrated by: Victor McGregor
- Cinematography: Bernard Cousineau
- Edited by: Steven Legge; Ramses Madina
- Production company: Farmer's Requiem Productions
- Release date: September 12, 2007 (TIFF)
- Running time: 9 minutes
- Country: Canada
- Language: English

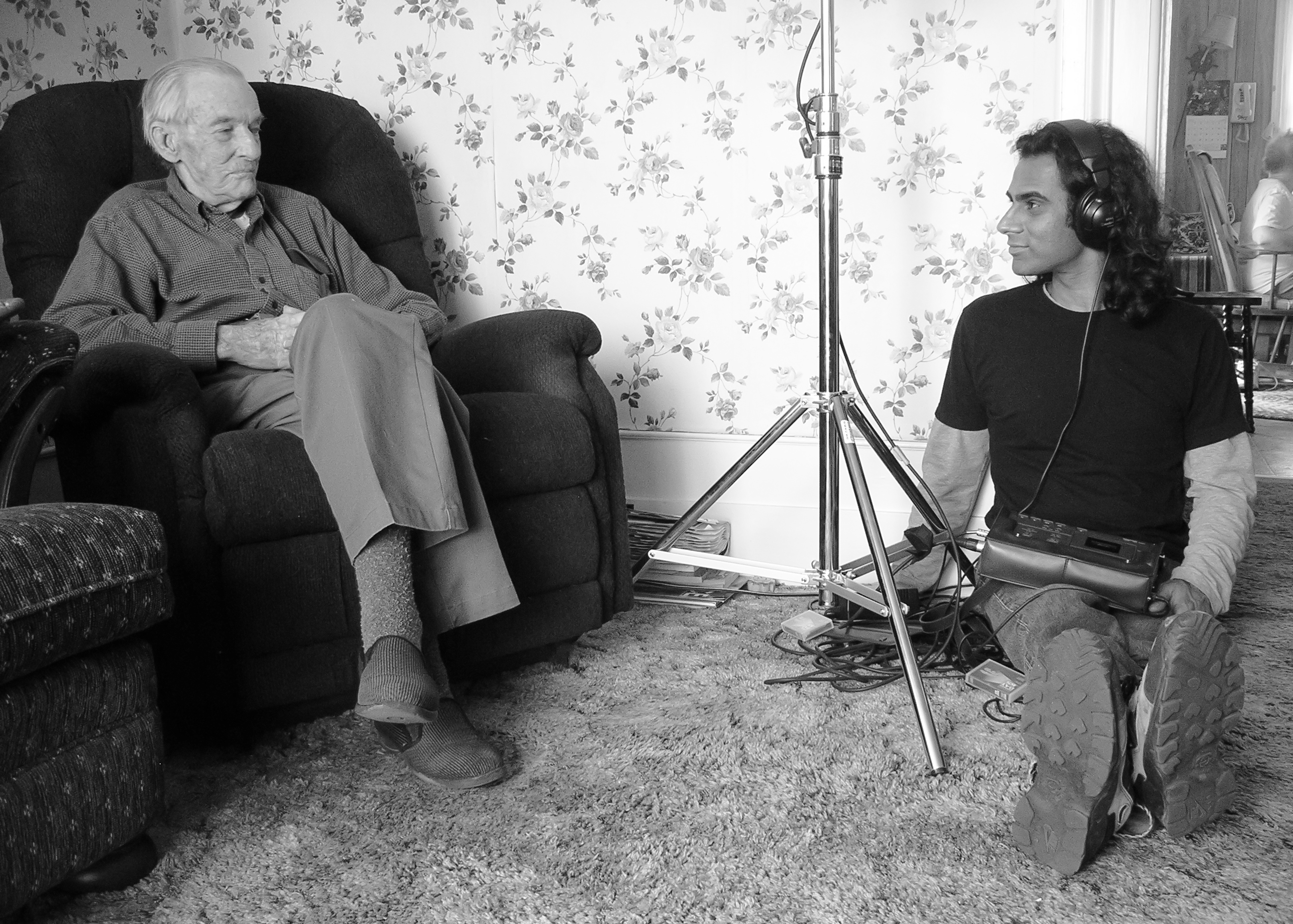
Ramses Madina interviewing Victor McGregor for Farmer's Requiem

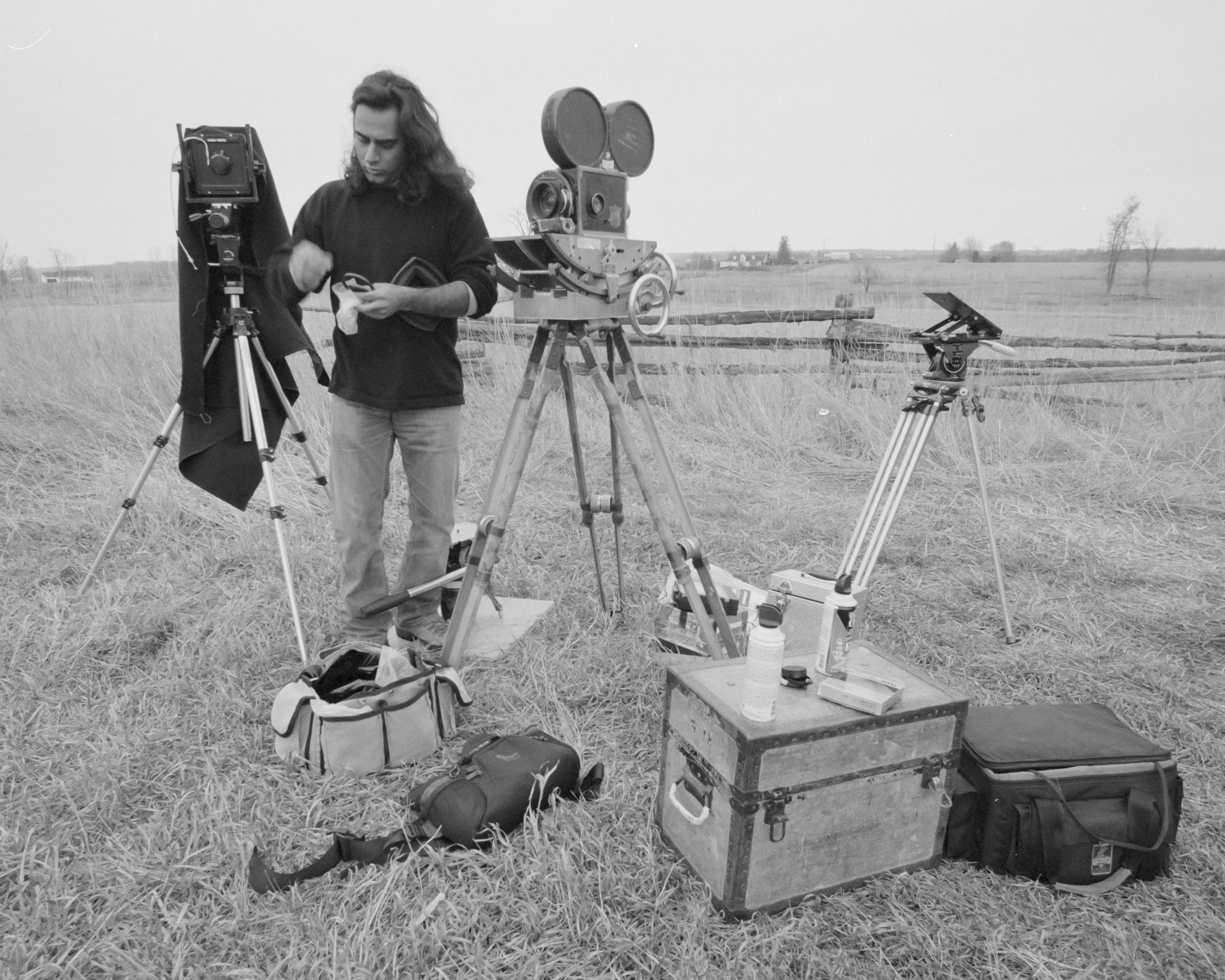
Ramses Madina Farmer's Requiem Production Still

Farmer's Requiem is a Canadian short documentary film, directed by Ramses Madina and released in 2007. Shot primarily in Prince Edward County and the rural Carp, Woodlawn and Kanata North areas of Ottawa. The film documents rural landscapes and vernacular architecture on the cusp of urban sprawl and transformation. Voiceover by farmer Victor McGregor offers observations and thoughts on the changing times and decline of farming as a way of life. The film was shot on 35mm using a Bell & Howell 2709 film camera. Sound and picture was edited on a Steenbeck flatbed editing machine. The tactile production and post production workflow allowed for the use of vanishing film technologies echoing similar themes explored in the film.

The film premiered at the 2007 Toronto International Film Festival. It was subsequently shown at the Ottawa City Hall art gallery as the centrepiece of a two-month exhibition on the history of farming in the Ottawa area, alongside Madina's still photography of vernacular architecture made during the production of the film.

The film was named to the Toronto International Film Festival's year-end Canada's Top Ten list for short films in 2007.
