= Mateo Guez =

French-Canadian director, writer and photographer

Mateo Guez is a director, writer, photographer and producer. Born in Paris, France, he resides in Toronto, Ontario, Canada.

== Biography ==
His 1996 effort, Le Dernier Jour, took first prize at the Decine festival, and the Audience Award at the International Film Festival of Cergy Pontoise. Since then Guez has directed music videos for a variety of European and Canadian artists including Molly Johnson, as well as directing the much lauded short film, L'Ultima Notte, which was screened at a variety of prestigious festivals worldwide in 2003 – including The Toronto International Film Festival, the 26th Clermont-Ferrand International short film festival, the Berlin International Film Festival, and the Inside Out Toronto Gay and Lesbian Film festival.

Recent efforts include his work as one of three contributing directors to the unique interactive feature, Late Fragment – an official selection at TIFF 2007 – as well as a variety of short films/photo installations shot using only a Motorola cell phone.

The latest of these interactive cell phone photo/video installations was exhibited at the 2009 Contact Annual Toronto Photography Festival and shares not only its name, but also its subject matter with his 2009 feature film debut, Off World.

Shot on location in the vast urban slum of Manila's Smokey Mountain in the Philippines, the film is a portrait of both the place, and the people who inhabit it. Off World premiered at the 2009 São Paulo Film Festival and won the Tonya Lee Williams Award for Outstanding Canadian Feature at the 10th ReelWorld International Film Festival.

Guez' next feature, entitled Innocent, is in development.
