= Chloé Leriche =

Canadian film director from Quebec

Leriche in 2023

Chloé Leriche is a Canadian film director from Montreal, Quebec. Her debut feature film, Before the Streets (Avant les rues), received six Canadian Screen Award nominations at the 5th Canadian Screen Awards in 2017, including Best Picture and a nod for Leriche as Best Director.

Leriche, a largely self-taught filmmaker, made a number of short films and worked as an educator with film and video training programs for homeless youth and First Nations, before writing and directing Before the Streets. Her most noted short film, The Schoolyard (Les Grands), was named to the Toronto International Film Festival's annual Canada's Top Ten list for short films in 2007.

Before the Streets won the Borsos Competition award for best picture, and Leriche won the award for best director, at the 2016 Whistler Film Festival. At the 2016 Directors Guild of Canada awards, Leriche won the DGC Discovery Award.

Her second feature film, Atikamekw Suns (Soleils Atikamekw), premiered at the 2023 Festival du nouveau cinéma, and was shortlisted for the 2023 DGC Discovery Award.
