= Michel Mongeau (actor) =

Canadian actor (c.1946–2020)

- Born: c. 1946
- Died: 11 November 2020
- Occupation: Actor

Michel Mongeau (c. 1946 – 11 November 2020) was a Canadian actor.

== Radio ==
From 1989 to 1997, Mongeau talked on 275-Allô, a daily radio show for 6 to 12 year olds broadcast on Ici Radio-Canada Première in the early evenings.

== Filmography ==
Year	Title	Role	Notes
1989	He Shoots, He Scores	Mike Ferguson	10 episodes
1990	Ding et Dong (Ding et Dong, le film)	Henri	
1991	Le Choix	Mike Ferguson	TV movie
1992	Tirelire Combines & Cie	Marie's father	
1994	Les mots perdus	Voix hors champ	
1996	100 dessins dessous	Narrator	
2003	How My Mother Gave Birth to Me During Menopause	Postulant à la bibliothèque	
2003	8:17 p.m. Darling Street (20h17, rue Darling)	Le policier	
2003	Gaz Bar Blues	Policier	
2003	100% bio		
2004	The Last Tunnel	Paolo Morrietti	
2007	Shake Hands with the Devil	Luc Marchal	
2011	Funkytown	Juge	
2015	Chorus	Jean-Jacques Roy	
2016	Those Who Make Revolution Halfway Only Dig Their Own Graves	Juge	
2019	Jouliks	François	(final film role)

== Dubbing ==
- The Bronswik Affair (1978)
- Oliver & Company (1988)
- 100 dessins dessous (1996)
- Prince of Persia: The Sands of Time (2003)
