= Ana Serrano =

Ana Serrano (b. 1983) is an American artist working primarily with cardboard.

== Personal life ==
Born in 1983, Ana Serrano was raised in Los Angeles, California. A first generation Mexican-American, Serrano's family originates from the northwestern state of Sinaloa. She received a BFA in illustration from the Art Center College of Design in 2008. As of 2016, Serrano resides in Portland, Oregon.

== Work ==
Serrano primarily creates small and large scale three-dimensional colorful architectural works out of cardboard. She was initially attracted to cardboard as a primary material due to its accessibility. Serrano's art practice also makes use of easily accessible tools like X-ACTO blades, scissors, rulers, hot glue guns, and cardboard and paper in every color. She has exhibited work in solo shows as well as group exhibitions at Los Angeles County Museum of Art, Pasadena Museum of California Art, National Museum of Mexican Art, and at Vincent Price Art Museum. Serrano was one of 47 artists showcased in The U.S.-Mexico Border: Place, Imagination, and Possibility exhibition at Craft and Folk Art Museum as part of the Getty-sponsored initiative Pacific Standard Time: LA/LA, an exploration of Latin American and Latino/Latina art across many southern California institutions. Her work Cartonlandia and Chalino, are both large cardboard sculptural pieces painted in vibrant colors that she created during her undergraduate days. In Cartonlandia, Serrano wanted to capture the spirit of the unplanned architecture and buildings of Tijuana. She felt it was important to represent these landscapes that were so central to her upbringing. Serrano has created site-specific work including the Salon of Beauty installation at Rice University Art Gallery in Houston in 2011 and Homegrown at the Pasadena Museum of California Art in 2018.
