= Online Film Critics Society Awards 2009 =

13th Online Film Critics Society Awards

13th Online Film Critics Society Awards

January 5, 2010

Best Picture:
The Hurt Locker

The 13th Online Film Critics Society Awards, honoring the best in film for 2009, were announced on 5 January 2010.

== Winners and nominees ==
=== Best Picture ===
The Hurt Locker

- Inglourious Basterds
- A Serious Man
- Up
- Up in the Air

=== Best Director ===
Kathryn Bigelow – The Hurt Locker

- Neill Blomkamp – District 9
- James Cameron – Avatar
- Joel Coen and Ethan Coen – A Serious Man
- Quentin Tarantino – Inglourious Basterds

=== Best Actor ===
Jeremy Renner – The Hurt Locker

- Jeff Bridges – Crazy Heart
- George Clooney – Up in the Air
- Sharlto Copley – District 9
- Joaquin Phoenix – Two Lovers

=== Best Actress ===
Mélanie Laurent – Inglourious Basterds

- Carey Mulligan – An Education
- Gabourey Sidibe – Precious
- Meryl Streep – Julie & Julia
- Tilda Swinton – Julia

=== Best Supporting Actor ===
Christoph Waltz – Inglourious Basterds

- Peter Capaldi – In the Loop
- Jackie Earle Haley – Watchmen
- Woody Harrelson – The Messenger
- Anthony Mackie – The Hurt Locker

=== Best Supporting Actress ===
Mo'Nique – Precious

- Vera Farmiga – Up in the Air
- Anna Kendrick – Up in the Air
- Diane Kruger – Inglourious Basterds
- Julianne Moore – A Single Man

=== Best Original Screenplay ===
Inglourious Basterds – Quentin Tarantino

- (500) Days of Summer – Scott Neustadter & Michael H. Weber
- The Hurt Locker – Mark Boal
- A Serious Man – Joel Coen and Ethan Coen
- Up – Bob Peterson

=== Best Adapted Screenplay ===
Fantastic Mr. Fox – Wes Anderson and Noah Baumbach

- District 9 – Neill Blomkamp & Terri Tatchell
- In the Loop – Jesse Armstrong, Simon Blackwell, Armando Iannucci and Tony Roche
- Up in the Air – Jason Reitman and Sheldon Turner
- Where the Wild Things Are – Spike Jonze & Dave Eggers

=== Best Foreign Language Film ===
The White Ribbon

- Broken Embraces
- Police, Adjective
- Silent Light
- Summer Hours

=== Best Documentary ===
Anvil! The Story of Anvil

- The Beaches of Agnès
- Capitalism: A Love Story
- The Cove
- Food, Inc.

=== Best Animated Feature ===
Up

- Coraline
- Fantastic Mr. Fox
- Ponyo
- The Princess and the Frog

=== Best Cinematography ===
Inglourious Basterds – Robert Richardson

- Avatar – Mauro Fiore
- District 9 – Trent Opaloch
- The Hurt Locker – Barry Ackroyd
- A Serious Man – Roger Deakins

=== Best Editing ===
The Hurt Locker – Chris Innis and Bob Murawski

- (500) Days of Summer – Alan Edward Bell
- Avatar – Steve R. Moore, John Refoua & Stephen Rivkin
- District 9 – Julian Clarke
- Inglourious Basterds – Sally Menke

=== Best Original Score ===
Up – Michael Giacchino

- Fantastic Mr. Fox – Alexandre Desplat
- The Informant! – Marvin Hamlisch
- Star Trek – Michael Giacchino
- Where the Wild Things Are – Carter Burwell and Karen O
