= District 9 (soundtrack) =

District 9: Original Motion Picture Soundtrack

Film score by Clinton Shorter
- Released: August 18, 2009 (original); November 24, 2014 (expanded)
- Genre: Film score
- Length: 29:45 (original); 54:22 (expanded)
- Label: Madison Gate Records
- Producer: Clinton Shorter

Clinton Shorter chronology
Terminus (2007)	District 9 (2009)	Cole (2009)

District 9: Original Motion Picture Soundtrack is the soundtrack to the 2009 film District 9. The album, produced by Clinton Shorter, was released by Madison Gate Records on August 18, 2009 on cd-r, four days after the film's release, and features 11 tracks. An expanded edition of the album was released on November 24, 2014, by Spacelab9, featuring eight additional tracks in double disc CD and vinyl LP record formats.

== Background ==
Shorter prepared for three weeks to score the film. He initially used a kamancheh in the soundtrack, but director Neill Blomkamp felt that it "was not dark and deep enough". Shorter used computer effects to make the kamancheh sound more synthetic. Blomkamp felt the orchestral score sounded too much like traditional film music, like that of E.T. the Extra-Terrestrial, and liked Shorter's production. Some of the film was scored in full orchestra. Shorter further recalled:

"One of the tricky things was, the film starts off as a documentary, and it took us a while to get the sound together, because I'm used to scoring sequences, and what he really wanted was more of a blanket type of score for the opening, the first act. He couldn't really articulate it, he just wasn't too sure, and I kept scoring and scoring and scoring … I was framing in too much, and he really wanted it to be more a documentary style where they just ride the fader up and down, then as the film gets more dramatic and cinematic, they introduce more traditional scoring styles."

Blomkamp wanted a "raw and dark" score, but one that maintained its South African roots. This was a challenge for Shorter, who found much of the South African music he worked with to be optimistic and joyful. Unable to get the djembe and ngoma drums to sound dark and heavy, Shorter used a combination of taiko drums and synthesized instruments for the desired effects, with the core South African elements of the score conveyed in the vocals and smaller percussion. The score also featured music and vocals from Kwaito artists.

== Track listing ==
=== Standard ===
No.	Title	Length
1.	"District 9"	6:28
2.	"I Want That Arm"	2:13
3.	"She Calls"	1:35
4.	"Exosuit"	3:15
5.	"Harvesting Material"	1:46
6.	"Heading Home"	1:14
7.	"A Lot Of Secrets"	2:27
8.	"Back to D9"	1:45
9.	"Wikus Is Still Running"	2:57
10.	"Get Him Talking"	2:05
11.	"Prawnkus"	4:00
Total length:		29:45

=== Expanded edition ===
Disc 1
No.	Title	Length
1.	"A Lot Of Secrets"	2:28
2.	"Field Officer"	2:17
3.	"Heading To District 9"	2:11
4.	"Flaunting The Law"	1:21
5.	"Hospital"	3:02
6.	"Gun Test"	2:48
7.	"Harvesting Material"	1:45
8.	"Wikus Is Still Running"	2:58
9.	"Back To District 9"	1:46
10.	"You Can Fix This"	3:40
Total length:		24:16

Disc 2
No.	Title	Length
11.	"She Calls"	1:36
12.	"How Many Moons"	1:37
13.	"I Want That Arm"	3:30
14.	"Dropship"	6:17
15.	"Get Him Talking"	2:06
16.	"Exosuit"	3:16
17.	"District 9"	6:29
18.	"Heading Home"	1:15
19.	"Prawnkus"	4:00
Total length:		30:06

== Reception ==
Music critic Jonathan Broxton of Movie Music UK reviewed the score positively, but noted that he "may have been a little more scathing" if it was written by a more esteemed composer. Thomas Glorieux of Main Titles was disappointed by the soundtrack because "several of the better tracks just didn't make it on the CDR edition that Sony published after the success of the film", but felt that the album consisted of "appropriate tension music and moody sound design".

Filmtracks.com compared the soundtrack positively to Hans Zimmer's work on Tears of the Sun and Batman Begins, calling it a "guilty pleasure".

== Credits ==
Credits adapted from CD liner notes.

- Music – Clinton Shorter
- Recording – Jan Holzner
- Mixing – Vince Renaud
- Mastering – Dan Randall
- Music editor – Nigel Scott, Steve Gallagher
- Executive in charge of music (Sony Pictures Entertainment) – Lia Vollack
- Soundtrack executive producer – Michelle Belcher
- Copyist – Jiri Simunek
- Layout and design – Jarrod Kolnos

Performer

- Electric cello – Peggy Lee
- Kamancheh – Reza Honari
- Yayli tanbur – Pepe Danza
- Vocals – Alpha Yaya Diallo

Orchestra

- Conductor – Adam Klemens
- Orchestra contractor – James Fitzpatrick
- Orchestration – Aiko Fukushima, Jeff Toyne
- Assistant orchestrator – Quynne Craddock
