= Trent Opaloch =

Canadian actor and cinematographer (born 1969)

- Born: December 31, 1969 (age 56); Thunder Bay, Ontario, Canada
- Years active: 1998–present

Trent Opaloch is a Canadian cinematographer, known for his work with directors Neill Blomkamp and the Russo brothers.

In 2010, he was nominated for the BAFTA Award for Best Cinematography for District 9.

In 2020, Opaloch starred in the music video for Pearl Jam's single "Retrograde".

== Background ==
Opaloch grew up in Thunder Bay, Ontario.

He studied filmmaking at the Confederation College before moving to Vancouver to start his professional career.

== Filmography ==
Short film

| Year | Title | Director |
|---|---|---|
| 2003 | Run | Richard Valentine |
| 2006 | Yellow | Neill Blomkamp |
| 2006 | Tempbot | Neill Blomkamp |
| 2007 | Terminus | Trevor Cawood |
| 2009 | Bug Hutch | Robin Hays |
| 2010 | Badass Thieves | Mike George |
| 2012 | Ghost Recon: Alpha | François Alaux; Hervé de Crécy |
| 2017 | Post No Bills | Robin Hays; Andy Poon |
| 2022 | Smell Worthy | Anthony Leonardi III |
| 2025 | Peeper | Richard Valentine |

Feature film

| Year | Title | Director |
|---|---|---|
| 2009 | District 9 | Neill Blomkamp |
| 2013 | Elysium | Neill Blomkamp |
| 2014 | Captain America: The Winter Soldier | Anthony and Joe Russo |
| 2015 | Chappie | Neill Blomkamp |
| 2016 | Captain America: Civil War | Anthony and Joe Russo |
| 2018 | Avengers: Infinity War | Anthony and Joe Russo |
| 2019 | Avengers: Endgame | Anthony and Joe Russo |
