= Eugene Wanangwa Khumbanyiwa =

Malawian-South African actor

Eugene Khumbanyiwa
- Wanangwa
- Born: Zomba, Malawi
- Education: Universal Group of Colleges
- Known for: District 9, Chappie, Death Race: Inferno

Eugene Khumbanyiwa is a Malawian and South African stage, television, film and voice actor, popularly known for playing the role of Obesandjo in the 2009 Oscar nominated sci-fi hit District 9.

== Career ==
He started his acting career as an extra in the 2004 Oscar-nominated Hotel Rwanda, starring Don Cheadle and Sophie Okonedo, playing one of the hotel staff members. After that he worked sporadically, hustling his way in the film industry by appearing in TV commercials and prime-time soaps like Generations, Scandal, and also had a role in South African independently produced hit film Gangster's Paradise: Jerusalema before landing a role as an underground warlord in the Peter Jackson-produced and Neill Blomkamp-directed four-times Oscar-nominated sci-fi hit District 9 Upon gaining critical acclaim for his performance in District 9, he attracted new international attention and even appeared in an American TV commercial for a famous cyber fraud security product called 'Identity Guard.'.

He went on to feature in Hollywood movies like Death Race 3: Inferno, alongside stars like Danny Trejo and Luke Goss, also appeared in Chappie starring Sharlto Copley, Hugh Jackman, Dev Patel and Sigourney Weaver. He teamed up with director Blomkamp again and Sigourney Weaver playing lead role Amir the saviour in a short sci-fi film called Rakka. Khumbanyiwa has appeared in three of Hollywood director Neill Blomkamp's films.

He played Pastor Peter in a two time BAFTA-winner Damilola, Our Loved Boy, a British television film about the events surrounding the 27 November 2000 death of Damilola Taylor. The film aired on BBC One on 7 November 2016, and was written by Levi David Addai, directed by Euros Lyn, and starred Babou Ceesay and Wunmi Mosaku. He also appeared in the critically acclaimed US TV miniseries The Looming Tower, directed by Alex Gibney which premiered on Hulu on February 28, 2018, starring Jeff Daniels and Peter Sarsgaard, based on Lawrence Wright's 2006 book of the same name. He played a Kenyan security guard at the US Embassy in Nairobi who survived the embassy bombing and became a crucial witness.

He has over 25 screen acting credits to his name. He does voices for both TV and radio. His voice work credits include the prestigious Africa Cup of Nations (AFCON2013) soccer tournament's "hello" radio ads campaign for the City of Johannesburg.

On 9 July 2016, Khumbanyiwa was awarded the Best Achiever in Entertainment at the Malawi Achievers Awards- South Africa.

== Filmography ==
=== Film ===
Year	Title	Role
2004	Hotel Rwanda	Hotel staff (uncredited)
2008	Gangster's Paradise: Jerusalema	Drug Dealer
2009	District 9	Obesandjo
2009	Crime Safari	Subre
2011	Paradise Stop	Malawian trucker
2013	Death Race: Inferno	Nero
2013	Algiers Murders	Ferdinand
2014	SEAL Team 8: Behind Enemy Lines	Arms Cache Manager
2015	Chappie	King
2017	Harry's Game	Moggomo
2017	Rakka	Amir
2018	The Roar	Poacher
2018	Beautifully Broken	Augustine

=== Television ===
Year	Title	Role	TV Channel
2006	Scandal	Motor Examiner	Etv
2006	Generations	Henchman	SABC1
2009	7de Laan	Derin	SABC2
2010	4Play: Sex Tips for Girls	Moeke	Etv
2011	Laugh Out Loud	Prince	Mzansi Magic
2011	Rhythm City	Carlos	Etv
2014	Muvhango	Kanu Nkosi	SABC2
2015	Getroud met rugby	Troy	KykNET TV
2016	Damilola, Our Loved Boy	Pastor Peter	BBC One
2016	90 Plein Street	Kenyan Ambassador	SABC 2
2017	Ses'Top La	Akina Nix	SABC1
2017	Lockdown	Jones	Mzansi Magic
2018	The Looming Tower	Trenton Okuru	Hulu (USA)
