= Chappie (film) =

2015 film directed by Neill Blomkamp

- Theatrical release poster
- Directed by: Neill Blomkamp
- Written by: Neill Blomkamp; Terri Tatchell
- Produced by: Neill Blomkamp; Simon Kinberg
- Starring: Sharlto Copley; Dev Patel; Hugh Jackman; Ninja; Yolandi Visser; Jose Pablo Cantillo; Sigourney Weaver
- Cinematography: Trent Opaloch
- Edited by: Julian Clarke; Mark Goldblatt
- Music by: Hans Zimmer (Note: Additional music by Steve Mazzaro and Andrew Kawczynski)
- Production companies: Columbia Pictures; MRC; LStar Capital; Kinberg Genre
- Distributed by: Sony Pictures Releasing
- Release dates: March 4, 2015 (New York City); March 6, 2015 (United States)
- Running time: 120 minutes
- Countries: United States; South Africa
- Languages: English; Afrikaans
- Budget: $49 million
- Box office: $105 million

Chappie (stylized as CHAPPiE) is a 2015 dystopian science fiction action film directed by Neill Blomkamp and written by Blomkamp and Terri Tatchell. A bilateral co-production between the United States and South Africa, the film stars Sharlto Copley, Dev Patel, Hugh Jackman, Ninja, Yolandi Visser, Jose Pablo Cantillo, and Sigourney Weaver. The film, set and shot in Johannesburg, is about an artificial general intelligence law enforcement robot captured and taught by gangsters, who nickname it Chappie.

Chappie premiered in New York City on March 4, 2015, and was released in U.S. cinemas on March 6, 2015. The film grossed $105 million worldwide against a $49 million budget, and received mixed reviews from critics.

== Plot ==
A skyrocketing crime rate leads the dystopian city of Johannesburg, South Africa to buy a squadron of scouts—state-of-the-art armor-plated attack robots—from weapons manufacturer Tetravaal. These autonomous androids were developed by British scientist Deon Wilson and largely supplant the overwhelmed human police force.

A competing project within Tetravaal is the remote-controlled heavy weapons platform MOOSE, developed by Australian soldier-turned-engineer Vincent Moore. Deon is praised for Tetravaal's success, but Vincent grows envious when the police will not give his project equal attention.

At home, Deon creates a prototype artificial intelligence that mimics a human mind, feeling emotions and having opinions, but Tetravaal CEO Michelle Bradley refuses to permit testing the A.I. on a police robot. Undeterred, he takes a recently damaged one before it is destroyed, putting it in his van, along with the "guard key" needed to update its software.

Heading home with the damaged robot, Deon is kidnapped by gang members Ninja, Yolandi, and Amerika. When he explains Tetravaal does not have remote controls for the police robots, they order him to reprogram it instead. Deon installs the new software into the damaged robot, which then responds with childlike trepidation upon powering up. Deon and Yolandi calm it, teach it words, and name it "Chappie". Despite Deon wanting to stay with Chappie, Ninja forces him out of their hideout.

Ninja's gang only has a few days to pay a debt of 20 million rand to Hippo. Yolandi sees Chappie as a child and wants to mother him, but Ninja grows impatient with his development due to both the impending deadline for the debt and Chappie's irreplaceable battery running out, giving him days to live.

Ninja leaves Chappie in a dangerous neighborhood to fend for himself to train him to become a gangster. After being wounded by thugs, he is followed by Vincent, who plans to deactivate all Tetravaal scouts except for MOOSE. Vincent successfully extracts the guard key for his own use, but the traumatized Chappie escapes and returns to the hideout.

Yolandi scolds Ninja for this mistreatment, but he earns Chappie's forgiveness by training him in martial arts and weapon handling. Ninja and Amerika trick Chappie into stealing cars, and lie about getting the money to replace his dying body.

At Tetravaal, Vincent uses the guard key to upload a virus, thus sabotaging and disabling all scouts including Chappie. Johannesburg's criminals immediately run rampant in the streets and Deon brings Chappie to the Tetravaal factory to fix him. After being restarted, Chappie notices a helmet used to control MOOSE. At the hideout, he re-engineers it to transfer his consciousness into a computer, so he can change bodies when his current one dies.

Ninja's gang uses Chappie to rob an armored car, which is caught on the news, prompting Tetravaal to pursue him. When Chappie learns that Ninja's plan to acquire the body is a lie, he prepares to kill Ninja for betrayal. However, Deon arrives to warn them that Bradley has ordered that Chappie be destroyed.

At that moment, the MOOSE robot (controlled remotely by Vincent) is launched to assassinate Deon and Chappie at the hideout, simultaneously as Hippo arrives to collect his debt. Amerika and Hippo are killed in the ensuing battle while Deon is mortally wounded. When Ninja is about to be killed, Yolandi sacrifices herself to save him, and Chappie destroys MOOSE with a bomb.

Enraged by Yolandi's death, Chappie drives Deon to the factory, storms into an office, and fiercely beats Vincent close to death. He then transfers the dying Deon's consciousness into a spare robot through the modified MOOSE helmet. In return, the now-robotic Deon wirelessly transfers Chappie's consciousness into one of the nearby disabled scouts. Deon and Chappie go into hiding as the police discontinue their contract with Tetravaal, while it is implied that Vincent, assuming he survived, now faces serious criminal charges.

While burning memorabilia of Yolandi, the grieving Ninja finds a box containing a doll copy of her and a flash drive marked "Mommy's Consciousness Test Backup" which contains a copy of Yolandi's consciousness that Chappie took while testing the device on her. Chappie hacks into Tetravaal's manufacturing facility, builds a robot resembling Yolandi, and uploads the flash drive's contents.

== Cast ==
- Sharlto Copley as Chappie, a robot. Copley acted out the scenes in front of the camera interacting with the rest of the cast and lending his voice. Contrary to a 2014 story by Entertainment Weekly, visual effects supervisor Chris Harvey explained that the production did not use motion capture, and Copley's performance was used only as a reference by the animators who replaced him with the CGI for Chappie.
  - Copley also makes a cameo at the end as a police officer.
- Dev Patel as Deon Wilson, a programmer at Tetravaal
- Hugh Jackman as Vincent Moore, a former soldier turned Tetravaal engineer who is Chappie's nemesis
- Ninja as Ninja, a gang leader and metafictional version of himself from the South African zef rap-rave group Die Antwoord
- Yolandi Visser as Yolandi, a gang member and metafictional version of herself from the South African zef rap-rave group Die Antwoord
- Jose Pablo Cantillo as Amerika, a gang member
- Sigourney Weaver as Michelle Bradley, the CEO of Tetravaal
- Brandon Auret as Hippo, a powerful gangster to whom Ninja's group owes money
- Anderson Cooper as himself
- Eugene Wanangwa Khumbanyiwa as King

== Production ==
Chappie is Blomkamp's third feature-length film as director. He wrote the screenplay along with his wife Terri Tatchell, who also co-wrote District 9. It was unofficially based on Blomkamp's 2004 short film Tetra Vaal. They wrote Chappie in two weeks, while Blomkamp was doing Elysium. Filming began at the end of October 2013 in Johannesburg, South Africa. One scene was shot at the Ponte building. Filming was completed in February 2014. Re-shooting for the film took place in British Columbia, Canada in April 2014. The film was shot with Red Epic cameras, using Panavision anamorphic primes. Richard Muller said:

Panavision jumped in with four brand-new PVM-1741A OLED monitors, as well as a PVM-2541A for more critical evaluation work in the DIT van. Jacques McDonald from NLE managed to get FilmLight onboard by adding a prototype of the FLIP. It was technically a four-camera show, not counting the six GoPros, two [Sony] EX3s, FLIP, [Canon] 5D on a drone, and the [Sony] HDC-1500 in the Cineflex, which sometimes all played at the same time. The FLIP would handle at most two cameras, so we had to supplement that using Pomfort LiveGrade running through several Blackmagic HDLinks.

Lighting was handled by Kino Flo Celebs. The visual effects company was Image Engine, located in Vancouver. The name of the weapons company in Chappie – "Tetravaal" – is a reference to Blomkamp's 2003 short film of the same name, which centers on a police robot in Johannesburg with a similar design to Chappie. Blomkamp has said that Chappie is "basically based" on Tetra Vaal. Blomkamp also employed a robot with a similar design in his 2005 short Tempbot, and both Tempbot and his 2006 short/advertisement Yellow deal with a thinking and learning robot which tries to assimilate into society.

Blomkamp has cited the Appleseed character Briareos as an influence on the design of Chappie.

City Press / News24 reported that six of the cast and crew of the film, confirmed under the condition of anonymity that first-time actor Watkin "Ninja" Jones "made life on set hell during filming."

== Release ==
On February 6, 2015, IMAX Corporation and Sony announced that the film would be digitally re-mastered into the IMAX format and released into IMAX theatres domestically on March 6, 2015. The film was released in the United States on March 6, 2015.

=== Box office ===
Chappie grossed $31.6 million in North America and $73.4 million in other territories for a total gross of $105 million, against a budget of $49 million.

The film earned $4.6 million on its opening day, $5.3 million on its second day, and $3.5 million on its third day, totaling $13.4 million in its opening weekend while playing in 3,201 theaters. It had a $4,155 per-theater average and finished first at the box office.

=== Critical response ===
Review aggregator website Rotten Tomatoes reported a 32% approval rating, based on 227 reviews, and a rating average of 4.90/10. The website's critical consensus reads, "Chappie boasts more of the big ideas and visual panache that director Neill Blomkamp has become known for – and, sadly, more of the narrative shortcomings." On Metacritic, the film has a score of 41 out of 100, based on 39 critics, indicating "mixed or average" reviews. According to CinemaScore, audiences gave the film a grade of "B" on an A+ to F scale.

Justin Chang of Variety wrote, "Intelligence, artificial or otherwise, is one of the major casualties of Chappie, a robot-themed action movie that winds up feeling as clunky and confused as the childlike droid with which it shares its name." Todd McCarthy of The Hollywood Reporter wrote, "With unappealing one-note characters, retread concepts and implausible motivations, Chappie is a further downward step for director Neill Blomkamp."

Tim Grierson of Screen International wrote, "...despite his ambitions, Chappie is a bucket of bolts, Blomkamp's desire to say meaningful things outdistancing his ability to say them compellingly." Manohla Dargis of The New York Times wrote that Blomkamp "struggles with the material" but "even at his shakiest, Mr. Blomkamp holds your attention". Kenneth Turan of the Los Angeles Times called it "cartoonish and preposterous, and not in a good way".

Mick LaSalle of the San Francisco Chronicle rated it three out of four stars and wrote of Blomkamp, "It's hard to say how much he's doing consciously and how much he's doing through intuition, but he's doing really interesting things in Chappie, and right from the beginning." Tom Huddleston of Time Out London rated it four out of five stars and wrote that "this hugely entertaining oddity could never be mistaken for the work of any other filmmaker."

Ryan Lambie, from Den of Geek, gave the film a positive review stating, "Despite the ragged edges of its story, Chappie nevertheless has real heart beating under its shabby exterior. If you liked the director's previous films, you owe it to yourself to see this one too." IGN reviewer Josh Lasser also gave Chappie a positive review, with a 'Good' score of 7.6 out of 10. He praised Sharlto Copley's performance and the "big questions" it asks, but criticized its failure to answer those questions.

Several reviewers compared the Chappie character unfavorably to Jar Jar Binks of Star Wars. Sameen Amer of The Express Tribune opined that the film disregards logic as certain "existential quandaries" are randomly thrown in without straightening out any of the themes before moving on to the next.

=== Home media ===
The film was released on DVD And Blu-ray on June 16, 2015., and on 4K Blu-Ray on March 1, 2016.

=== Accolades ===
Award	Category	Recipient	Result
Visual Effects Society	Outstanding Animated Performance in a Photoreal Feature	Earl Fast, Chris Harvey, Mark Wendell, Robert Bourgeault	Nominated
Behind the Voice Actors Awards	Best Male Lead Vocal Performance in a Feature Film	Sharlto Copley	Nominated
World Soundtrack Awards	Film Composer of the Year	Hans Zimmer	Nominated

== Cancelled sequel ==
Blomkamp said he "wrote Chappie as a trilogy" and expressed interest in making sequels if they were "economically feasible". Eventually, Blomkamp confirmed that a sequel would not be made after the film did not perform well enough.
