= Demonic (2021 film) =

2021 supernatural horror film by Neill Blomkamp

- US theatrical release poster
- Directed by: Neill Blomkamp
- Written by: Neill Blomkamp
- Produced by: Neill Blomkamp; Mike Blomkamp; Stuart Ford; Linda McDonough
- Starring: Carly Pope; Chris William Martin; Michael J. Rogers; Nathalie Boltt; Terry Chen; Kandyse McClure
- Cinematography: Byron Kopman
- Edited by: Austyn Daines
- Music by: Ola Strandh
- Production companies: AGC Studios; Stabiliti Studios
- Distributed by: VVS Films (Canada); IFC Midnight (United States)
- Release date: August 20, 2021
- Running time: 105 minutes
- Countries: United States; Canada
- Language: English
- Budget: $1.5 million
- Box office: $366,656

Demonic is a 2021 science fiction supernatural horror film written, co-produced and directed by Neill Blomkamp. The film stars Carly Pope, Chris William Martin, Michael J. Rogers, Nathalie Boltt, Terry Chen and Kandyse McClure. Filmed amid the COVID-19 pandemic, it was released on August 20, 2021, receiving generally negative reviews from critics.

== Plot ==
Carly (Carly Pope) is a young woman who has fallen out of contact with her mother Angela (Nathalie Boltt). Angela is convicted of killing more than 20 people in a spree where she burned down a care home she worked at and poisoned a church. Carly is supported by her best friend Sam (Kandyse McClure). The pair cut off their other childhood friend Martin (Chris William Martin) after he began to espouse strange theories about Angela.

One day, Carly receives a text from Martin who wants to meet up and talk. Martin tells Carly that he was invited to be part of a focus group test for a company called Therapol which involved real medical patients, one of which was a comatose Angela. Carly is later contacted by Therapol, who ask her to visit their facility to discuss Angela.

She meets scientists Daniel (Terry Chen) and Michael (Michael J. Rogers) who explain Angela fell into a coma following a series of violent episodes in prison and is "locked-in" inside her body. They tell Carly that Angela is highly active inside a simulation, calling for Carly and Martin. They ask Carly if she is willing to enter Angela's mind to talk to her, which she reluctantly agrees to do. In the simulation, Carly enters a copy of her childhood home and angrily confronts Angela about her crimes. Angela, fully able to speak in the simulation, demands that Carly leaves. That night, Carly has a nightmare where she finds a strange symbol made of a raven carcass.

Carly arrives at Therapol for another trip inside the simulation. This time she enters through a new tunnel into a field outside an old sanatorium which Angela had worked at. She meets with Angela, who claims that she was not the person who called for Carly and Martin. Angela's body in the simulation starts to glitch out and the scientists ignore a terrified Carly's demands to be removed from the simulation.

Entering the sanatorium, she finds Sam's body before being attacked by an avian-like Demon which slashes its arm open, creating the same cut on Carly's real-life body. Carly exits the simulation and tells Daniel and Michael how years ago, she and Martin found Angela in the sanatorium with the same cut on her arm. Carly refuses to participate in another simulation.

Carly visits Martin and tells him about her experience. He shows her his theories about demonic possession, showing Carly a sketch of the creature she saw in the simulation. Martin claims to have suffered similar nightmares to Carly's and explains how the demon manipulates its target through their family and friends. He also tells Carly of his theory that the Vatican is funding special black ops groups consisting of priests. The Vatican buys companies like Therapol to detect genuinely possessed people who seemingly suffer from medical conditions before the squad eliminates the demon by bringing it to its entry point from hell. In the case of the supposed demon taking over Angela, this is the sanatorium. A bewildered Carly refuses to believe this theory; Martin begins to suspect the demon has latched onto Carly.

That night, a concerned Sam pays Carly a visit and Carly sends her away. Sam returns later into the night this time with a bird mask and telling Carly to "look for me in the woods". Sam puts on the bird mask and suddenly contorts her body, chasing Carly around the house. Carly barricades herself in her bedroom where she is attacked by the demon. Carly wakes up; the events are seemingly a dream and she rushes to Sam's house. It is revealed that Daniel and Michael are watching her and that Martin's theory is correct: they are priests and plan to eliminate the demon at the sanatorium. The demon has become obsessed with Carly while trapped in Angela's comatose body and wants to possess her to commit the same crimes it made Angela do. Carly finds Sam missing from her house and recruits Martin to help rescue her. They travel to the woods and retrieve a traumatized Sam, who claims a group of men took Angela into the nearby sanatorium. They leave Sam in Martin's car and head out to find Angela.

At the sanatorium, they find the black ops team has been massacred and stumble upon a dying Daniel. Daniel explains the demon has entered Michael, who killed the squad, and gives Carly a holy lance that will kill the demon. In the sanatorium, Carly enters the simulation to rescue Angela. She finds Angela, who is finally free of the demon and makes amends with her daughter before dying peacefully. Carly escapes the simulation and looks for Martin. She stumbles across his car which is now in flames as well as Sam's burnt corpse. Carly finds Martin being tortured by Michael, who pursues Carly. Carly stabs Michael with the lance, killing him and accidentally sending the demon into herself. Carly wrestles with the possession before stabbing herself with the lance, killing the demon.

Sometime later, Carly awakens in a hospital and makes amends with Martin. She leaves flowers at Angela's grave.

== Cast ==
- Carly Pope as Carly
- Chris William Martin as Martin
- Michael J. Rogers as Michael
- Nathalie Boltt as Angela
- Terry Chen as Daniel
- Kandyse McClure as Sam

== Production ==
The film was shot in mid-2020, during the COVID-19 pandemic, in British Columbia, Canada.

== Release ==
IFC Midnight bought rights to the film in the United States, where it was released in theaters on August 20, 2021, a week before being made available on video on demand. In its opening weekend, the film made $36,500 in 85 theaters. The film grossed $366,656 at the box office.

== Reception ==
Review aggregator website Rotten Tomatoes reports an approval rating of 15% based on 82 reviews, with an average rating of 4.20/10. The site's critics consensus reads: "Neill Blomkamp's return to low-budget, high-concept filmmaking bungles some interesting ideas, adding up to another Demonic waste of the writer-director's once-promising talent." On Metacritic, the film has a weighted average score of 36 out of 100 based on 21 critics, indicating "generally unfavorable reviews".
