= Switched (novel) =

Book by Amanda Hocking

- Author: Amanda Hocking
- Language: English
- Series: Trylle Trilogy (Book One)
- Genre: Paranormal romance
- Publisher: Self-published, St. Martin's Press
- Publication date: April 2010 (eBook); January 2012 (print)
- Publication place: United States
- Media type: eBook, Print (paperback)
- Pages: 316
- ISBN: 978-1-4536-8893-9
- Followed by: Torn

Switched is the first book of the young adult paranormal literature series the Trylle Trilogy. It follows the story of Wendy Everly as she meets Finn Holmes, who informs her of her inherited royal status and true identity as a member of the Trylle.

== Background ==
Switched was first self-published as an eBook by author Amanda Hocking in early 2010, and was published in paperback by St. Martin's Press on January 24, 2012. Her failing to initially get published through traditional book publishers was an advantage because "it allowed me to put a lot of books on the market quickly, so if people liked them, they could immediately buy another" ... so the first of a trilogy, Switched, sold 50 eBooks the first month and increased rapidly reaching almost a million copies. This was "the most spectacular example of an author striking gold through ebooks."

== Plot summary ==
In the prologue, Wendy recounts her sixth birthday party. At the party, she expresses contempt at the gifts of fragile porcelain dolls and throws a tantrum after being presented with a chocolate birthday cake, which she does not like. After which, Wendy's mother claims that she is not her daughter and attempts to take Wendy's life with a large kitchen knife, but is stopped by Wendy's brother Matt.

Eleven years later, Wendy is living with her brother and her aunt Maggie, who assumed guardianship after her mother was placed in a mental institution. After difficulties at previous schools, Wendy had just transferred to a new high school when she meets Finn, another new student, who asks her to a school dance. At the dance, Finn makes some rude comments to Wendy which angers her, and prompts her to want to leave. She approaches another student and gets him to take her home through a "persuasive" ability by looking in his eyes and telling him what she wants. When Wendy performs this ability in front of Finn, he becomes alarmed. Later that night, Finn comes to her bedroom window and tells her that she is a changeling and that he is here to bring her back to her biological family. He tells her that her ability to "persuade" people is because she is Trylle.

At first Wendy does not believe Finn, but then she recounts the differences between herself and her family. She uses her persuasive ability to get her brother Matt to drive her to the mental institution to visit her mother, Kim, who advises she still doesn't believe that she is her child. Kim states that the doctor told her that she was pregnant with a boy which is one of the reasons she doesn't believe Wendy is her child. After the visit Wendy starts to consider that she may be a changeling. One morning, she decides to take a walk to consider the implications of what Finn told her when she is attacked by two trackers from a rival Trylle band. Finn rescues her from her attack but tells her that she is not safe.

Wendy leaves with Finn and they head to a gated and protected community in Minnesota called Forening. There Wendy meets her biological mother, Queen Elora, who is aloof and distant with her. Wendy learns she is a princess and will become queen of this community upon Queen Elora's death. She also meets Rhys, who is a mansklig, which is the human child that is taken when the Trylle offspring is left behind. She learns that Trylle have various supernatural abilities at various strengths and she starts instruction on learning to develop and control her ability. Wendy is invited to sit in on royal meetings with high ranked members of the community, with results that Elora shows displeasure with because Wendy does not understand Trylle protocol. Wendy also gets the sense that there some background information that is being withheld.

Whilst wandering the Palace for more information, Wendy breaks into a locked room stocked with many undisplayed paintings. Finn finds her and tells her that Elora's Trylle power is of precognition that she can only express through painting. Finn tells her of the societal rules of the Trylle; whilst the Princess, Queens and Marksinna (nobles) are the highest, the Trackers and mänsklig are considered even lower than the peasantry. Finn begins to tutor her in the history and etiquette of the Trylle so that Wendy can properly handle her future role as Queen and not embarrass Elora. He warns Wendy that she cannot become involved with Rhys past a platonic level as it would "corrupt" the bloodline of the royalty, and the strong powers held by the royals would cease to exist.

An introductory ball is scheduled to be held in Wendy's honour. Elora tells Wendy that she will be choosing a more appropriate name for her Trylle life. Wendy says that she does not want to and will not, much to Elora's annoyance. Elora speaks with Finn and he resigns. Wendy finds him before he goes and the two share a kiss. Finn says that he cannot allow her to proceed.

At Wendy's ball, the Vittra attack, forcing the Trylle that possess helpful powers to retaliate. During the fight Jen, the Vittra tracker who had previously attacked Wendy when trying to kidnap her, rounds on her, knocking Rhys unconscious in the process. Finn returns, almost losing his life to aid the princess. Tove, a young Markis, uses psychokinesis to save Finn's life and successfully get rid of Jen. Elora and the other Trylle manage to quell the Vittra threat. Finn and Wendy reunite, until Elora informs Wendy that Finn has left, having been transferred once more. Wendy reacts angrily and uses her persuasive powers on Rhys to get him to drive her back to Matt and Maggie.

== Characters ==
Wendy

Narrator of the series. The Trylle "Princess". She lived with her brother (Matt) and Aunt Maggie after her mother, Kim, tried to kill her at the age of six. The first chapter starts the book eleven years later. Wendy was kicked out of countless schools for violence. At the start of the book she has just moved to a new town and new school. She promises that she is trying to do better and makes friends Patrick and Finn. She develops feeling for Finn, the newest boy to the school, who is constantly staring at her. He is the one who takes her away to the Trylle town, Forening. Her biological mother is the Trylle "Queen", Elora.

Matt

Wendy's older "host" brother. He named her when she was born as her mother would not.

Finn

Wendy's tracker and bodyguard. She has feelings for him which he seems to return throughout the book.

Elora

Wendy's mother. Queen of the Trylle.

Willa

Wendy's friend in the Trylle town. She is also a Markisina.

Tove

A Markis.

Kim

Matt's mother, put away in a mental institution because she tried to kill Wendy.

Rhys

Kim's real son, Matt's real brother. Taken in place of Wendy. Called a "Mänks".

Maggie

Matt's and Rhys' aunt. Wendy's "host" aunt.

Rhiannon

Like Rhys, a Mänks, but she is Willa's mänsklig.

== Adaptations ==
In February 2011, the Trylle Trilogy was optioned for a film, with Terri Tatchell writing the screenplay.
