= Amanda Hocking =

American novelist (born 1984)

- Born: July 12, 1984 (age 42); Austin, Minnesota, U.S.
- Occupation: Author
- Writing career
- Genres: Young adult fiction Paranormal romance
- Notable works: Watersong series, Trylle Trilogy
- Website: hockingbooks.com

Amanda Hocking (born July 12, 1984) is an American writer of paranormal romance young adult fiction.

== Early life ==
Hocking was born and raised in Austin, Minnesota. After high school, she studied human services while working in a group home for people with disabilities.

== Career ==
While employed as a group home worker, she wrote 17 novels in her free time. Hocking left her employment as a group home worker and started self-publishing her novels as e-books in April 2010, at the age of 25. By March 2011, she had sold more than a million copies of her first nine books and earned two million dollars from sales, previously unheard of for self-published authors. In early 2011, Hocking averaged 9,000 book sales each day. She's since published more than twenty novels, several of which have made The New York Times Best Seller list.

== Work ==
Hocking's published work, originally self-published, consists of My Blood Approves, a vampire romance series; the Trylle Trilogy, which covers a teenage girl's journey of self-discovery in an urban fantasy setting; and Hollowland, a zombie novel. The New York Times characterized her novels as "part quirky girl-like-Hocking characters, part breakneck pacing, part Hollywood-style action, and part bodice-ripping romance—they are literature as candy, a mash-up of creativity and commerce."

In March 2011, Hocking signed her first conventional publishing contract for four books, for two million dollars, with St. Martin's Press, for her young-adult paranormal series Watersong. Book one, Wake, was released in August 2012. All three books in her previously self-published Trylle Trilogy were also sold to St. Martin's Press and were re-released from January–April 2012. In 2015, Hocking announced she had signed a new three-book deal with St. Martin's and revealed that the books would be a standalone and a duology, respectively. The standalone, called Freeks and set around a traveling circus in the 1980s, was published in January 2017, while the duology to be based on valkyries of Norse mythology was set for a 2017 release.

=== Bibliography ===
- My Blood Approves series:
  - My Blood Approves (March 27, 2010)
  - Fate (April 15, 2010)
  - Flutter (May 25, 2010)
  - Wisdom (August 22, 2010)
    - Letters to Elise: A Peter Townsend Novella (December 19, 2010)
  - Swear (November 9, 2016)
- Trylle Trilogy
  - Switched (self-published 2010, with St. Martin's January 24, 2012)
  - Torn (self-published 2010, with St. Martin's February 28, 2012)
  - Ascend (self-published 2011, with St. Martin's April 24, 2012)
- The Hollows series:
  - Hollowland (October 5, 2010)
  - Hollowmen (November 8, 2011)
  - Hollowland: Redux (June 2023)
  - Hollowmen: Redux (June 2023)
  - Hollow Stars (2023)
  - Hollow Child (2024))
  - Hollow Valley (2025)
  - Hollow Night (Upcoming Halloween 2026)
- Virtue (May 27, 2011)
- Watersong series
  - Forgotten Lyrics (October 30, 2012)
  - Wake (August 7, 2012)
  - Lullaby (November 27, 2012)
  - Tidal (June 4, 2013)
  - Elegy (August 6, 2013)
- The Kanin Chronicles
  - Frostfire (January 2015)
  - Ice Kissed (May 2015)
  - Crystal Kingdom (August 2015)
  - The King's Games: A Prequel Novelette (June 24, 2015)
  - Hidden Kingdom (November 14, 2017)
- Freeks (January 3, 2017)
- Valkyrie
  - Between the Blade and the Heart (January 2, 2018)
  - From the Earth to the Shadows (March 27, 2018)
- The Omte Origins
  - The Lost City (2020)
  - The Morning Flower (2020)
  - The Ever After (2021)
- Bestow the Darkness (2021)
- Seven Fallen Hearts Saga
  - Virtue (2021)
  - Tristitia (2022)
  - Superbia (coming early 2024)

=== Adaptations ===
In February 2011, the Trylle Trilogy was optioned for a film, with Terri Tatchell writing the screenplay. As of 2015 the rights have reverted to Hocking, with no prospects for future development.

== Personal life ==
Hocking lives in Rochester, Minnesota with her husband and step-son.
