= Clinton Shorter =

Canadian composer

- Born: March 18, 1971 (age 54); North Vancouver, British Columbia, Canada
- Genres: Film score
- Occupation: Composer
- Website: www.clintonshorter.com

Clinton Shorter (born March 18, 1971) is a Canadian film and television composer. He is particularly known for his score for Neill Blomkamp's film District 9. He has also composed the music for over 300 television episodes.

== Early life and education ==
Shorter was born in North Vancouver, British Columbia. He initially studied jazz in college before switching to music composition.

== Career ==
Shorter created the score for an independent film, Come Together, in Vancouver. He went on to create music for several more films in the Vancouver area, including Neill Blomkamp 's short Alive in Joburg.

Shorter was asked to create a score for Blomkamp's 2009 science fiction film District 9, "something 'raw and dark' but which maintained its [South] African roots". The resulting music has been described by reviewers as "rhythmic" and "magnificent", as "mournful ethnic-action strains", and as having "pseudo-exotic ambiance as a post-modern theme of loss". The sound track was released separately as a CD.

In 2014 Shorter wrote the score for the action film Pompeii. He subsequently composed music for the television series The Expanse and Colony.

== Discography ==
=== Film ===
| Year | Title | Director | Notes | Ref. |
|---|---|---|---|---|
| 2001 | Come Together | Jeff Macpherson | | |
| 2005 | Alive in Joburg | Neill Blomkamp | Short film | |
| 2005 | The Cabin Movie | Dylan Akio Smith | | |
| 2005 | Severed | Carl Bessai | | |
| 2006 | Nostalgia Boy | Michael Meinhardt | Short film Nominated – Leo Award for Best Musical Score in a Short Drama | |
| 2006 | Unnatural & Accidental | Carl Bessai | | |
| 2007 | Normal | Carl Bessai | | |
| 2007 | Terminus | Trevor Cawood | | |
| 2009 | District 9 | Neill Blomkamp | BMI Film Music Award; SOCAN Domestic Feature Film Award; Nominated – IFMCA Award for Breakthrough Film Composer of the Year; Nominated – World Soundtrack Award for Discovery of the Year | |
| 2009 | Cole | Carl Bessai | Nominated – Leo Award for Best Musical Score in a Feature Length Drama | |
| 2012 | Contraband | Baltasar Kormákur | BMI Film Music Award | |
| 2013 | 2 Guns | Baltasar Kormákur | BMI Film Music Award | |
| 2013 | The Informant | Julien Leclercq | | |
| 2014 | Pompeii | Paul W.S. Anderson | SOCAN International Feature Film Award | |
| 2021 | Boss Level | Joe Carnahan | | |
| 2021 | Copshop | Joe Carnahan | | |
| 2025 | Not Without Hope | Joe Carnahan | | |
| 2026 | The Rip | Joe Carnahan | | |

=== Television ===
| Year | Title | Notes | Ref. |
|---|---|---|---|
| 2006 | Ties That Bind | Television film | |
| 2006 | Presumed Dead | Television film | |
| 2006 | 12 Hours to Live | Television film | |
| 2006 | Her Fatal Flaw | Television film | |
| 2006 | Under the Mistletoe | Television film | |
| 2007 | A Decent Proposal | Television film | |
| 2007 | Secrets of an Undercover Wife | Television film | |
| 2007 | Judicial Indiscretion | Television film | |
| 2007 | This Space for Rent | 2 episodes | |
| 2007 | Post Mortem | Television film | |
| 2008 | Nightmare at the End of the Hall | Television film | |
| 2008 | The Secret Lives of Second Wives | Television film | |
| 2008 | NYC: Tornado Terror | Television film | |
| 2014 | Intelligence | 13 episodes BMI TV Music Award | |
| 2015–16 | House of Lies | 22 episodes | |
| 2015–18 | Code Black | 47 episodes BMI TV Music Award | |
| 2015–2021 | The Expanse | 46 episodes | |
| 2016–18 | Colony | 36 episodes | |
| 2018 | Quantico | 13 episodes | |
| 2020 | Tribes of Europa | 6 episodes | |
