= Trylle Trilogy =

Trylle Trilogy is a young adult fantasy series by American author Amanda Hocking. The trilogy follows the story of Wendy Everly, a 17-year-old girl who stumbles upon another world where she eventually learns of her true identity.

Hocking had originally self-published the series as e-books, selling more than 1.5 million copies. In 2011, St. Martin's Press signed on Hocking and re-released the books, starting with Switched (January 2012), Torn (February 2012) and Ascend (April 2012).

== Books ==
- Switched
- Torn
- Ascend

== Movie adaptation ==
In October 2014, screenwriter Terri Tatchell (co-writer of District 9) optioned Hocking's Trylle Trilogy and plans to write a screenplay based on the three books.
