= Elysium (film) =

2013 film by Neill Blomkamp

- Theatrical release poster
- Directed by: Neill Blomkamp
- Written by: Neill Blomkamp
- Produced by: Simon Kinberg; Bill Block; Neill Blomkamp
- Starring: Matt Damon; Jodie Foster; Sharlto Copley; Alice Braga; Diego Luna; Wagner Moura; William Fichtner
- Cinematography: Trent Opaloch
- Edited by: Julian Clarke; Lee Smith
- Music by: Ryan Amon
- Production companies: TriStar Pictures; Media Rights Capital; QED International; Alphacore; Kinberg Genre
- Distributed by: Sony Pictures Releasing
- Release dates: August 7, 2013 (Taiwan); August 9, 2013 (United States)
- Running time: 109 minutes
- Country: United States
- Languages: English; Spanish
- Budget: $115 million
- Box office: $286.1 million

Elysium is a 2013 American dystopian science fiction action film written, co-produced, and directed by Neill Blomkamp. It was Blomkamp's second directorial effort. The film stars Matt Damon and Jodie Foster alongside Sharlto Copley, Alice Braga, Diego Luna, Wagner Moura, and William Fichtner. It takes place on a ravaged Earth and a luxurious artificial world called Elysium.

The film was released on August 9, 2013, by Sony Pictures Releasing through the TriStar Pictures label, in both conventional and IMAX theaters. It received positive reviews, but was considered a disappointment after the success of Blomkamp's first film, District 9. With a budget of $115 million, Elysium was TriStar's most expensive film. It grossed $286.1 million worldwide.

== Plot ==
In 2154, Earth is overpopulated, diseased, and heavily polluted from ecocide. The planet's citizens live in extreme poverty. In contrast, the rich and powerful live on Elysium, an orbiting space station just outside Earth's atmosphere, with luxuries including Med-Bays, medical devices that can heal any disease or condition.

Spider, a hacker living in Los Angeles, runs a space shuttle operation to smuggle people into Elysium. Elysium Defense Secretary Delacourt is in charge of preventing illegal entry to Elysium. She orders hired killer Kruger to shoot down Spider's space shuttles. Elysium President Patel reprimands Delacourt for overstepping her mandate, threatening to terminate her position for any more unauthorized actions. Patel discharges Kruger. In retaliation, Delacourt offers Armadyne Corp CEO John Carlyle defense contracts for life if he creates a program allowing Delacourt to conduct a coup and install herself as president. Carlyle writes the program and stores it inside his brain.

On Earth, parolee Max Da Costa works for Armadyne Corp when he is accidentally exposed to a lethal dose of radiation. He is only given medication for the side effects and told he has five days to live after being fired by Carlyle. Max and his friend Julio approach Spider to bargain: if Max successfully downloads valuable information from an ultra-rich Elysium citizen's brain, Spider will give Max a shuttle ride to Elysium to use a Med-Bay to cure his condition. Max demands that the target be his former boss, Carlyle. Due to his declining health, Spider provides Max with a powerful exoskeleton via surgery.

Max and Julio shoot down Carlyle's shuttle to Elysium; Carlyle is fatally injured in a shootout against his security robots. Max and Julio successfully extract the program from his brain, but the data becomes unexpectedly scrambled, locked behind a security program. Delacourt sends Kruger and a black ops team to retrieve it. Kruger kills Julio, but an injured Max escapes with the copy of the program, while Carlyle's death destroys any possibility of further retrieval from his brain.

Max seeks help from his childhood friend and nurse, Frey, whose daughter has leukemia. After she patches him up, Max goes to Spider. He realizes that the data in Max's head is a program that can reboot the entire Elysium mainframe. Delacourt locks down all flights up to Elysium, leaving Spider unable to take Max. Max angrily leaves, though not before Spider discreetly places a tracking device on him. After Kruger kidnaps Frey and her daughter, Max approaches him and offers him the data for the use of a Med-Bay. Kruger accepts, and Delacourt lifts the lockdown so the group can travel to Elysium. During the flight, Kruger and Max fight over the data, and a grenade explodes in Kruger's face, damaging the ship. The ship then crashes on Elysium; Max is arrested and taken to Delacourt, who orders a team to extract the data. Max escapes and heads to the armory to save Frey, who has been turned over to Kruger's men. Kruger is revived by a Med-Bay and confronted by Delacourt, whom he fatally wounds. He orders his men to start killing the politicians on the station while he dons a more advanced exoskeleton suit to hunt down Max, planning to initiate the protocol himself.

Spider lands on Elysium and finds Max. Max wants Spider to have his men protect Frey and get her daughter to a Med-Bay to be healed. They reach the computer core, where they are confronted by Kruger. Max and Kruger engage in combat, which ends with Max managing to disable Kruger's connection to his suit; Kruger responds by attempting to kill them both with a grenade, but Max throws him over the ledge as the grenade explodes, killing Kruger. Spider connects Max to the computer, but the data transfer will kill Max if he downloads it. Max says his goodbyes to Frey and initiates the download, killing him. The Elysium computer reboots, allowing Frey to heal her daughter. The robot police arrive but cannot arrest Spider, as everyone on Earth is now considered a citizen of Elysium. Medical shuttles loaded with Med-Bays are dispatched to Earth to heal everyone who needs help.

== Cast ==
- Matt Damon as Max Da Costa, a former criminal on parole. Max was raised in an orphanage with Frey and promised her that one day he would take her to Elysium.
  - Maxwell Perry Cotton as young Max
- Jodie Foster as Defense Secretary Jessica Delacourt. She is responsible for the security on Elysium and resorts to illegal means to keep immigrants off the torus.
- Sharlto Copley as Agent M. Kruger, a black ops agent working secretly for Delacourt. He is a psychopathic killer with a reputation for using extreme measures.
- Alice Braga as Frey Santiago, Max's childhood best friend. She works as a nurse and is a single mother to a daughter with leukemia.
  - Valentina Giron as young Frey
- Diego Luna as Julio, Max's best friend.
- Wagner Moura as Spider, a hacker and information thief who runs clandestine flights to Elysium.
- William Fichtner as John Carlyle. He is CEO of Armadyne Corp, the company that designed and built Elysium.
- Brandon Auret as Drake, one of Kruger's soldiers.
- Josh Blacker as Crowe, one of Kruger's soldiers.
- Faran Tahir as President Patel, leader of Elysium.
- Emma Tremblay as Matilda Santiago, Frey's daughter who is dying of cancer.
- Jose Pablo Cantillo as Sandro, one of Spider's hackers.
- Adrian Holmes as Manuel
- Jared Keeso as Rico
- Carly Pope, Ona Grauer and Michael Shanks as CCB agents
- Terry Chen as CCB Technician
- Alejandro Belmonte as Spider's Techie

== Production ==
Elysium was produced by Bill Block, Neill Blomkamp, and Simon Kinberg, and written and directed by Neill Blomkamp, the director and co-writer of District 9 (2009). It reunited Blomkamp with some of his District 9 crew, such as editor Julian Clarke, production designer Philip Ivey, cinematographer Trent Opaloch, and actor Sharlto Copley, playing one of the film's antagonists. Elysium is a co-production of TriStar Pictures and Media Rights Capital.

Although the film's story is set in 2154, Blomkamp has stated that it is a comment on the contemporary human condition. "Everybody wants to ask me lately about my predictions for the future," the director has said, "No, no, no. This isn't science fiction. This is today. This is now." In January 2011, independent studio Media Rights Capital met with major studios to distribute Elysium, and Blomkamp shared art designs of his proposed science fiction film. The art designs won over the executives at Sony Pictures, who bought the film after making a more attractive offer than the other studios.

The main role was first offered to South African rapper Watkin Tudor Jones, who did not take the role. The role was then offered to rapper Eminem, but he wanted the film to be shot in Detroit. That was not an option for the two studios and so Blomkamp moved on to Matt Damon as his next choice.

With a production budget of $115 million, production began in July 2011. The film's Earth-bound scenes were shot in a dump in the poor Iztapalapa district on the outskirts of Mexico City. The scenes for Elysium were shot in Vancouver and the wealthy Huixquilucan-Interlomas suburbs of Mexico City. To prepare for his role, Damon worked out four hours a day on a strict diet. Damon shaved his head for the role of Max. Re-shoots took place in October 2012.

Futuristic designs were executed by Philip Ivey after long periods of researching and studying older science fiction films. Ivey cited Syd Mead as a substantial influence for the film. Weta Workshop created the exosuits for Damon and Copley's characters, while the complicated visual effects were handled primarily by Image Engine, with additional work by Whiskytree, Moving Picture Company, The Embassy and Industrial Light and Magic, some of the software that was used for the visual effects were Autodesk Softimage.

The film's music score was composed by Ryan Amon and recorded at Abbey Road Studios with the Philharmonia Orchestra. The soundtrack was released on August 6, 2013.

== Lawsuit ==
In October 2013, a lawsuit was filed by Steve Wilson Briggs accusing the producers of copyright infringement, claiming he wrote a screenplay that was substantially similar to the movie. Several months before filing a lawsuit, he registered his screenplay with the U.S. Copyright Office to file an infringement complaint. On October 3, 2014, the U.S. District Court for the Northern District of California found in favor of the film's producers.

== Release ==
When the film was announced, Sony intended to release it in late 2012. It later set a release date for March 8, 2013, before moving one week earlier to prevent competing against Oz the Great and Powerful. In October 2012, Sony announced they had pushed back the release date to August 9, 2013. In April 2013, Sony announced that the film would be specifically reformatted for IMAX theaters. By that time, two theatrical trailers and a TV spot had already been showcased.

=== Home media ===
Elysium was originally released on DVD and Blu-ray on December 17, 2013, and later released on Ultra HD Blu-ray on February 9, 2021, by Sony Pictures Home Entertainment.

== Reception ==
=== Box office ===
Elysium grossed $93.1 million in North America and $193.1 million in other territories for a worldwide total of $286.1 million, against a production budget of $115 million. It made a net profit of $18 million, when factoring together all expenses and revenues for the film.

The film opened on August 9, 2013, and grossed $11.1 million on its opening day, ranking No. 1. It proceeded to rank No. 1 for the weekend, grossing $29.8 million.

=== Critical response ===
The review aggregator website Rotten Tomatoes gives the film an approval rating of 64% based on 263 reviews and an average rating of 6.4/10. The site's critical consensus reads, "After the heady sci-fi thrills of District 9, Elysium is a bit of a comedown for director Neill Blomkamp, but on its own terms, it delivers just often enough to satisfy." On Metacritic, the film has a weighted average score of 61 out of 100, based on 47 critics, indicating "generally favorable" reviews. Audiences polled by CinemaScore gave the film an average grade of "B" on an A+ to F scale.

In February 2015, while promoting Chappie, director Neill Blomkamp expressed some regrets regarding Elysium. In a research article entitled "Elysium as a Critical Dystopia", Tanner Mirrlees and Isabel Pedersen argue that "Elysium communicates a 'critical dystopia' that illuminates and interrogates present day global capitalism's worst social, political, ecological and technological conditions, but shows them being resisted and changed, for the better."

== Awards ==
Art Directors Guild 2014

Award	Category	Nominee	Result	Ref.
Excellence in Production Design Award	Fantasy Film	Philip Ivey (production designer); Don Macaulay (supervising art director); Nancy Anna Brown (set designer – Canada unit); Ross Dempster (art director – Canada unit); Hania Robledo (art director – Mexico unit); Catherine Ircha (assistant art director – Canada unit); Luis Antonio Ordoñez (assistant art director – Mexico unit); Syd Mead (conceptual artist); David Clarke (set designer – Canada unit); Mira Caveno (set designer – Canada unit); Ravi Bansal (concept artist); Ron Turner (concept artist); Mitchell Stuart (concept artist); Christian Pearce (concept designer); Leri Greer (concept designer); Stuart Thomas (concept designer); Aaron Beck (concept designer); Ben Mauro (concept designer); TyRuben Ellingson (concept designer); George Hull (concept designer); Brent Boates (storyboard artist); Robert Pratt (storyboard artist); Ray Lai (illustrator); Rob Jensen (illustrator); Andy Chung (previsualization artist); Peter Lando (set decorator – Canada unit); Gabriela Matus (set decorator – Mexico unit)	Nominated	

Golden Schmoes Awards 2013

Award	Category	Result	Ref.
Golden Schmoes	Best Sci-Fi Movie of the Year and Biggest Disappointment of the Year	Nominated	

Hollywood Film Awards 2013

Award	Nominee	Result	Ref.
Hollywood Movie Award	Neill Blomkamp	Nominated	

IGN Summer Movie Awards 2013

Award	Category	Result	Ref.
IGN Award	Best Sci-Fi Movie	Nominated	

Jupiter Award 2014

Award	Category	Nominee	Result	Ref.
Jupiter Award	Best International Film	Neill Blomkamp	Nominated	

Leo Awards 2014

Award	Category	Nominee	Result	Ref.
Leo	Best Visual Effects Motion Picture	Peter Muyzers; Andrew Chapman; Shawn Walsh; Cabral Rock	Won	

Satellite Awards 2013

Award	Category	Nominee	Result	Ref.
Satellite Award	Best Sound (Editing & Mixing)	Christopher Scarabosio; Craig Berkey; Dave Whitehead; David Husby	Nominated	

Visual Effects Society Awards 2013

Award	Category	Nominee	Result	Ref.
VES Award	Outstanding Compositing in a Feature Motion Picture	Jean Lapointe; Jordan Benwick; Robin Hackl; Janeen Elliott	Nominated	
VES Award	Outstanding Created Environment in a Live Action Feature Motion Picture	Votch Levi; Joshua Ong; Barry Poon; Kent Matheson	Nominated	

== See also ==
- List of films featuring space stations
- List of films featuring powered exoskeletons
- List of films featuring drones
- List of science fiction films
- Grey: Digital Target
- Medbed, conspiracy theory with similarities to the plot of the film
