= Off the Grid (video game) =

Battle royale video game

- Developer: Gunzilla Games
- Publisher: Gunzilla Games
- Writers: Neill Blomkamp, Richard K. Morgan
- Engine: Unreal Engine 5
- Platforms: PlayStation 5; Windows; Xbox Series X/S
- Release: October 8, 2024 (early access) October 2026 (Scheduled full release)
- Genres: Third-person shooter, battle royale
- Mode: Multiplayer

Off the Grid is an upcoming free-to-play battle royale video game developed and published by German-headquartered company Gunzilla Games. Currently in early access, the game will feature a narrative storyline directed by Neill Blomkamp, as well as an NFT marketplace for purchasing and selling in-game items. The game will release on PlayStation 5, Windows, and Xbox Series X/S.

== Gameplay ==
Set in a cyberpunk dystopia, players fight on the fictional Teardrop Island as participants in a mysterious competition using high-tech cybernetic prosthetics and futuristic military weapons and equipment. The game is played from a third-person perspective in PvE or PvP matches of up to 60 competitors. Current available game modes include Trios and Solos.

== Cryptocurrency and NFTs ==
Valve's policy prohibits the use of cryptocurrency and NFTs. The developers say that the NFT elements in the game are optional.

== Early access ==
Announced in May 2022, Off the Grid was scheduled for a 2023 release, though it has since been delayed with no full release date announced. The game entered early access on October 8, 2024, for all platforms.
