= Watersong =

Book series by Amanda Hocking

The Watersong series by the bestselling young adult fantasy paranormal author Amanda Hocking consists of four books: Wake, Lullaby, Tidal and Elegy. Hocking, who previously had success as a self-published author, signed a book deal with St. Martin’s Press worth $2 million.

== Watersong books ==
- Wake (August 7, 2012)
- Lullaby (November 27, 2012)
- Tidal (June 4, 2013)
- Elegy (August 6, 2013)

=== Other ===
- "Forgotten Lyrics" (short story) October 10, 2012)
