= Rakka (film) =

2017 American-Canadian military science fiction short film

- Directed by: Neill Blomkamp
- Written by: Neill Blomkamp; Tom Sweterlitsch
- Starring: Sigourney Weaver; Carly Pope
- Music by: Lorne Balfe
- Production company: Oats Studios
- Release date: June 14, 2017 (YouTube)
- Running time: 22 minutes
- Countries: United States; Canada
- Language: English

Rakka is a 2017 American-Canadian military science fiction short film made by Oats Studios and directed by Neill Blomkamp. It was released on YouTube and Steam on 14 June 2017.

== Plot ==
=== Chapter 1: World ===
In the near future, Earth will be attacked by technologically superior and highly aggressive reptilian aliens called the Klum (pronounced "klume"). Humanity is nearing extinction with millions dead or enslaved. The Klum transform the Earth in favor of their own ideal living conditions. They do this at first by burning forests and destroying cities. Then they build megastructures that alter the atmosphere by pumping out methane. The gas makes it progressively harder for terrestrial life to breathe. And it warms the climate, which leads to flooding of coastal cities.

The story begins in 2020, from the viewpoint of resistance fighters in Texas, a group of US Army soldiers and many others who have banded together. Most human survivors live underground or among ruins. They have barely enough provisions, weapons, and ammunition. The humans fight by using whatever they can against the primary Klum weapon: an omnipresent nanite in their weaponry, and telepathic control over any human that makes direct eye contact with them.

The resistance makes "brain-barriers" that block this mind control. The Klum know, however, that a scarcity of materials means a scarcity of brain barriers. They hope, therefore, to win a war of attrition against the human survivors.

Some prisoners are living incubators for the Klum's young, which inevitably kills the victims. Others are dissected. Still other humans are converted into human loudspeakers that urge humans to surrender into "conservatories". Very few humans ever escape.

After the Klum destroy a militia convoy with an airstrike, one of the surviving soldiers witnesses an angel-like being materialize from thin air. The narration describes ″them″ as mankind's saviours.

=== Chapter 2: Amir & Nosh ===
Nosh is a tech-savvy pyromaniac and bomb-maker, eking out a living in a scrapyard far from the resistance. The resistance despises Nosh for his murderous glee and demands - giving the sick or suicidal over as bait during his many IED ambushes. They must, however, give in to Nosh's demands to secure the IEDs and the brain-barriers he makes.

The resistance stumble across Amir, a mute who has escaped from the Klum. He has extensive cybernetics across his head and shoulders. Amid opposition from her lieutenants, the resistance leader, Jasper, releases Amir from her custody into the care of a resistance fighter named Sarah.

Sarah, having lost her daughter to the Klum's experiments, takes a liking to him. She gives Amir food and drink while trying to persuade him to help the resistance fight the Klum by using the precognitive abilities he acquired via the aliens' experiments.

=== Chapter 3: Siege ===
Amir recovers physically and mentally. Then, because of his implant, he has a premonition involving a wounded Klum on the run from militia forces.

Sarah pleads with Amir to help the militia officers to stop the genocide. The more she talks to him, the more his eyes change, seeing the premonition of the impending attack more clearly. Amir, still mute, foresees the militia successfully shooting down an alien aircraft, and the pilot is the alien on the run.

Sarah asks Amir if they will be able to learn how to hunt the Klum and teach them how to fear. Unable to answer, he foresees the Klum telekinetically bashing one of the militia soldiers, disconnecting his brain barrier and causing him to be mind-controlled, turning on his comrades, who are forced to kill him.

Sarah tells Amir that he now has the abilities the aliens have and that he is to use them for humanity. Back in the vision, the militia surround the Klum; Jasper orders the militia to cut off its head. The film ends with Sarah urging Amir to use his abilities because he is humanity's last hope.

== Cast ==
- Sigourney Weaver as Jasper
- Eugene Khumbanyiwa as Amir
- Robert Hobbs as Carl
- Carly Pope as Sarah
- Brandon Auret as Nosh
- Mike Huff as Policeman
- Owen McCrae as Klum
- Connor Page as Child
- Jay Anstey as A suicide bomber
- Justin Shaw as Man in medical device
- Carla Marais as eight-year-old girl
- Ryan Angilley as Martinez
- Alec Gillis as Militia officer 1
- Ruan Coetzee as Militia officer 2
- Paul Davies as Militia officer 3
- Pieter Jacobz as Militia officer 4
