= Torn (novel) =

2010 novel by Amanda Hocking

- The first book in the series
- Author: Amanda Hocking
- Language: English
- Series: Trylle Trilogy (Book Two)
- Genre: Paranormal romance
- Publisher: Self-published, St. Martin's Press
- Publication date: 12 November 2010
- Publication place: United States
- Media type: eBook, Print (paperback) (To be released)
- Pages: 314
- ISBN: 1-4563-5579-1
- Preceded by: Switched
- Followed by: Ascend

Torn is the second book of the young adult paranormal literature series the Trylle Trilogy. It picks up the story of Wendy Everly and the Trylle that began in Switched.

It was again self-published by Amanda Hocking as an eBook on 12 November 2010.

Hocking has referred to Torn as 'the dark middle child' of the series, citing more mature themes and a darker storyline than the previous novel.

== Plot ==
The start of the book begins almost exactly where the end of Switched left off, with Wendy and Rhys running away from the palace in the Trylle's Förening. The two arrive at the home and Wendy attempts to explain to her "host brother" Matt that Rhys is his brother. He reacts with disbelief yet she tells him that she cannot tell him where she has been or Finn's part in it all. While in the midst of trying to understand what has happened, Matt finds a disliking towards Rhys.

Later that night, Finn visits her and attempts to convince her to return to Förening with him. She refuses as another tracker, Duncan, shows up with the same goal. Wendy tells both that she will not return to Förening and they leave. Two Vittra members, Loki and Kyra, attack the house as Finn and Duncan leave and take the three to the Vittra palace to the King, in which Wendy is left badly injured by Kyra. While taken as prisoner by the Vittra, Wendy is severally injured and Matt asks a guard to bring in a doctor to heal her.

There (after being healed by Sara, a Vittra healer), Wendy practises her power of persuasion on Rhys with an unusual side effect. She is taken to the King named Oren who informs her that Sara is her step-mother and he is her father, a result from a prior union with Elora in an attempt to unify the Trylle and the Vittra. Wendy realizes that the Vittra have been so desperately after her because while they live long lives, many of them are infertile or give birth to hobgoblins, and she is the only means for an heir to the throne. Oren does not allow for Wendy's friends to leave the dungeon as insurance for Wendy's good behavior, so Wendy attempts to find a way to free them. After a heart-to-heart talk with Loki, Wendy realizes that they are both prisoners in different ways, and Loki allows the three to escape with help from Tove, Duncan and Finn and they return to Förening.

At Förening, Wendy begins classes with Tove, the skilled Markis who possesses grand powers of psychokinesis, to strengthen and control her own power. She is also assigned Duncan as a bodyguard.

One night, Elora alerts everyone nearby to the appearance of a Vittra on their perimeter. It is revealed to be Loki, and Wendy insists on imprisoning him instead of executing him. Wendy's powers begin to grow stronger as does Matt's relationships with Rhys and young Marksinna Willa.

Using her more-controlled powers, Wendy manages to get the location of Finn from Duncan and visits his family home where his mother raises Angora goats and his father is also a tracker. Finn shuns her on the grounds of the prejudice surrounding such a relationship.

Wendy confronts her mother about what Oren told her in her stay at the Vittra palace, to which Elora tells Wendy of her past and the arranged marriage between Wendy's father and her. Elora says that her parents thought of it as a good idea, so she did it without question. She tells Wendy that she has arranged her marriage to Tove to which Wendy objects. Elora begins to bleed from her nose and collapses, later informing her that she is dying from her precognition painting. Wendy learns that the powers used by the trolls age and drain them. Wendy eventually accepts the proposal and the two become engaged.

The Trylle and Vittra negotiate a treaty for Loki's return, the Vittra promising a cease-fire on Forening's grounds as long as Elora is still Queen. However, Loki later returns to Forening and asks her to escape both the Vittra and the Trylle with him, knowing she is not happy. They share a kiss, but Wendy does not accept and instead turns her time to learn the "dead language" of the Trylle so that she can better help the commune. Finn helps her with this until they experience a brief romantic interlude which Finn's father interrupts. Finn leaves, embarrassed and tells her that duty over love was the best choice for him.

The book ends with Tove giving an engagement ring to Wendy and they enter their engagement party together.

== Characters ==
Wendy Everly

Narrator of the series. The Trylle and Vittra "Princess". She lived with her host brother (Matt) and aunt Maggie after her host mother, Kim, tried to kill her at the age of six. Her biological mother is the Trylle Queen, Elora, and her father is the Vittra King, Oren. She is in love with Finn, the tracker who brought her to Forening, but cannot be with him because he ranks much lower than her. In this book, she begins developing a connection with Loki, one of the Vittra who kidnapped her, and her telekinetic powers begin to develop.

Matt Everly

Wendy's older "host" brother; falls in love with Willa. He named her when she was born as her mother would not.

Finn Holmes

Wendy's tracker and bodyguard. She has feelings for him, but he refuses to love her because he is afraid that he is keeping her from her duty.

Loki Staad

A Vittra Markis who has the power to knock others unconscious simply by looking at that.

Elora Dahl

Wendy's mother. Queen of the Trylle with precognition. As she falls ill, Wendy takes more control over running the kingdom.

Oren Elsing

Wendy's father. King of the Vittra. He is initially warm to Wendy when he first meets her, but his true character is revealed when he threatens her and her friends.

Sara Elsing

Wendy's stepmother, a powerful Vittra healer and the Queen of the Vittra. She is kind to Wendy during her stay in Ondarike.

Willa Strom

Wendy's best friend in the Trylle town. She is also a Marksinna, and falls in love with Matt.

Tove Kroner

A Markis and Wendy's fiance. Has strong psychokinetic powers.

Rhys Dahl

Kim's real son, Matt's real brother. Taken in place of Wendy. Called a "Mänks".
