= Tom Sweterlitsch =

American author (born 1977)

- Born: October 21, 1977 (age 48); Iowa, United States
- Occupation: Author
- Writing career
- Genre: Science fiction

Tom Sweterlitsch (born October 21, 1977) is an American author who has published the novels Tomorrow and Tomorrow and The Gone World.

== Publications ==
In Tomorrow and Tomorrow, Sweterlitsch addresses the cultural shift of recent years in a dystopian version of the United States. Facing depression, the main protagonist spends too much time in virtual reality, mourning his pregnant wife, dead in a nuclear terrorist attack that destroyed Pittsburgh. He also looks at problems created by highly personalized advertising.

In The Gone World, the author uses time travel in a new way: people can travel only to the future, creating a temporary possibility that disappears when the traveler comes back. In the novel, the technique is used for solving crimes. Unfortunately, the protagonists discover the end of the world is getting closer and closer to the present as they explore the future.

== Inspirations ==
Sweterlitsch was introduced to fiction while playing tabletop role-playing games, such as Dungeons & Dragons, when he was a teenager. He discovered his love for storytelling while remixing a novel from the Dragonlance Saga in sixth grade.

Science fiction creators that have influenced him include the writers J. G. Ballard, Philip K. Dick, Alice Sheldon, and films by Paul Verhoeven. He is also influenced by Edgar Allan Poe and Raymond Chandler, additionally mentioning William Gibson, Jeff VanderMeer, and Stephen King. Outside of science fiction, Sweterlitsch has expressed appreciation for the works of Dante, Emily Dickinson, Fyodor Dostoevsky, and Gustave Flaubert.

More specifically, for Tomorrow and Tomorrow, he was inspired by The Invention of Morel, by Adolfo Bioy Casares and by The City & The City by China Miéville. For The Gone World, he took inspiration from conversations with his late father-in-law, a U.S. Department of Defense physicist with whom he discussed time travel, and his brother-in-law, a real-life NCIS agent whom he once asked how time travel would affect criminal investigations.

== Personal life ==
Sweterlitsch has a master's degree in literary and cultural theory from Carnegie Mellon and worked for twelve years at the Carnegie Library for the Blind and Physically Handicapped.

Born in Iowa, he was raised in Canton, Ohio. He later moved to Pittsburgh, where he lives with his wife and daughter.

== Works ==
=== Novels ===
- Tomorrow and Tomorrow (2014)
- The Gone World (2018)

=== Short stories ===
- "The Disposable Man" (2012)
- "The Sandbox Singularity" (2018)
- "Neuro-Dancer" (2020)

=== Movie scripts ===
- Rakka (2017), with Oats Studios
- Firebase (2017), with Oats Studios
- Zygote (2017), with Oats Studios
