= Julian Clarke =

Canadian film editor

- Born: September 3, 1977 (age 49); Vancouver, British Columbia, Canada
- Occupation: Film editor
- Years active: 2001–present

Julian Clarke (born September 3, 1977) is a Canadian film editor. Clarke was born in Vancouver. He graduated from Kitsilano Secondary School before enrolling at the University of British Columbia as a film major. After graduating from UBC in 2000, Clarke immediately began to find work as a professional film editor. Clarke was nominated for a 2009 Academy Award for Best Film Editing, a BAFTA Award for Best Editing, an ACE Eddie Award for Best Edited Feature Film (Dramatic), a Satellite Award for Best Editing, and an Online Film Critics Society Award for Best Editing for his work on the science-fiction film, District 9.

== Filmography ==
Year	Film	Director	Other notes
2001	Come Together	Jeff Macpherson	
2003	Emile	Carl Bessai	
2005	Severed: Forest of the Dead	Carl Bessai	
2006	Unnatural & Accidental	Carl Bessai	Won – Leo Award for Best Editing
2007	Postal	Uwe Boll	
2007	American Venus	Bruce Sweeney	
2008	The Stagers	Keith Behrman and Grant Greschuk	
2008	Control Alt Delete	Cameron Labine	
2009	District 9	Neill Blomkamp	Nominated – Academy Award for Best Film Editing; Nominated – BAFTA Award for Best Editing; Nominated – American Cinema Editors Award for Best Edited Feature Film – Dramatic; Nominated – Satellite Award for Best Editing; Nominated – Online Film Critics Society Award for Best Editing
2011	The Whistleblower	Larysa Kondracki	
2011	The Thing	Matthijs van Heijningen Jr.	
2013	Elysium	Neill Blomkamp	Credit shared with Lee Smith
2015	Project Almanac	Dean Israelite	Credit shared with Martin Bernfeld
2015	Chappie	Neill Blomkamp	Credit shared with Mark Goldblatt
2016	Deadpool	Tim Miller	Nominated – American Cinema Editors Award for Best Edited Feature Film – Comedy or Musical
2016	The Escape	Neill Blomkamp	Credit shared with Austyn Daines and Devin Maurer
2018	Skyscraper	Rawson Marshall Thurber	Credit shared with Michael Sale
2019	Terminator: Dark Fate	Tim Miller	
2021	Red Notice	Rawson Marshall Thurber	Credit shared with Michael Sale
2024	Borderlands	Eli Roth	Credit shared with Evan Henke
2027	Voltron	Rawson Marshall Thurber	Credit shared with Michael Sale
