= Sharlto Copley =

South African actor

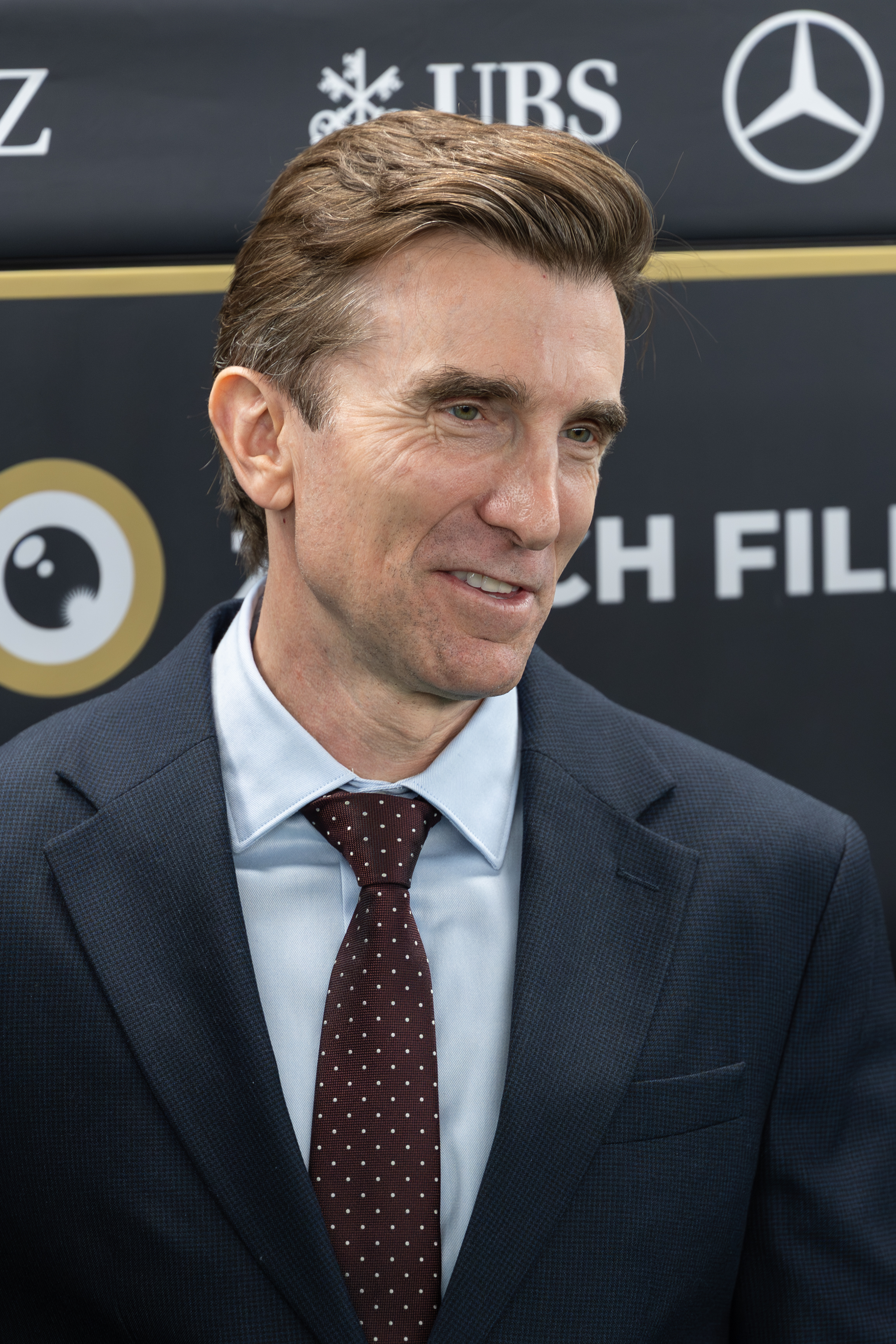
- Copley at the 2025 Zurich Film Festival
- Born: 27 November 1973 (age 52); Pretoria, Transvaal, (Note: Now Gauteng) South Africa
- Occupation: Actor
- Years active: 1996–present
- Spouse: Tanit Phoenix (m. 2016; div. 2023)
- Children: 1
- Website: sharltocopley.com

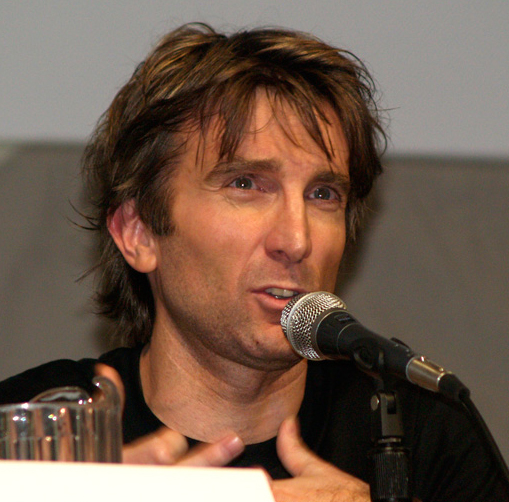
Copley in 2009

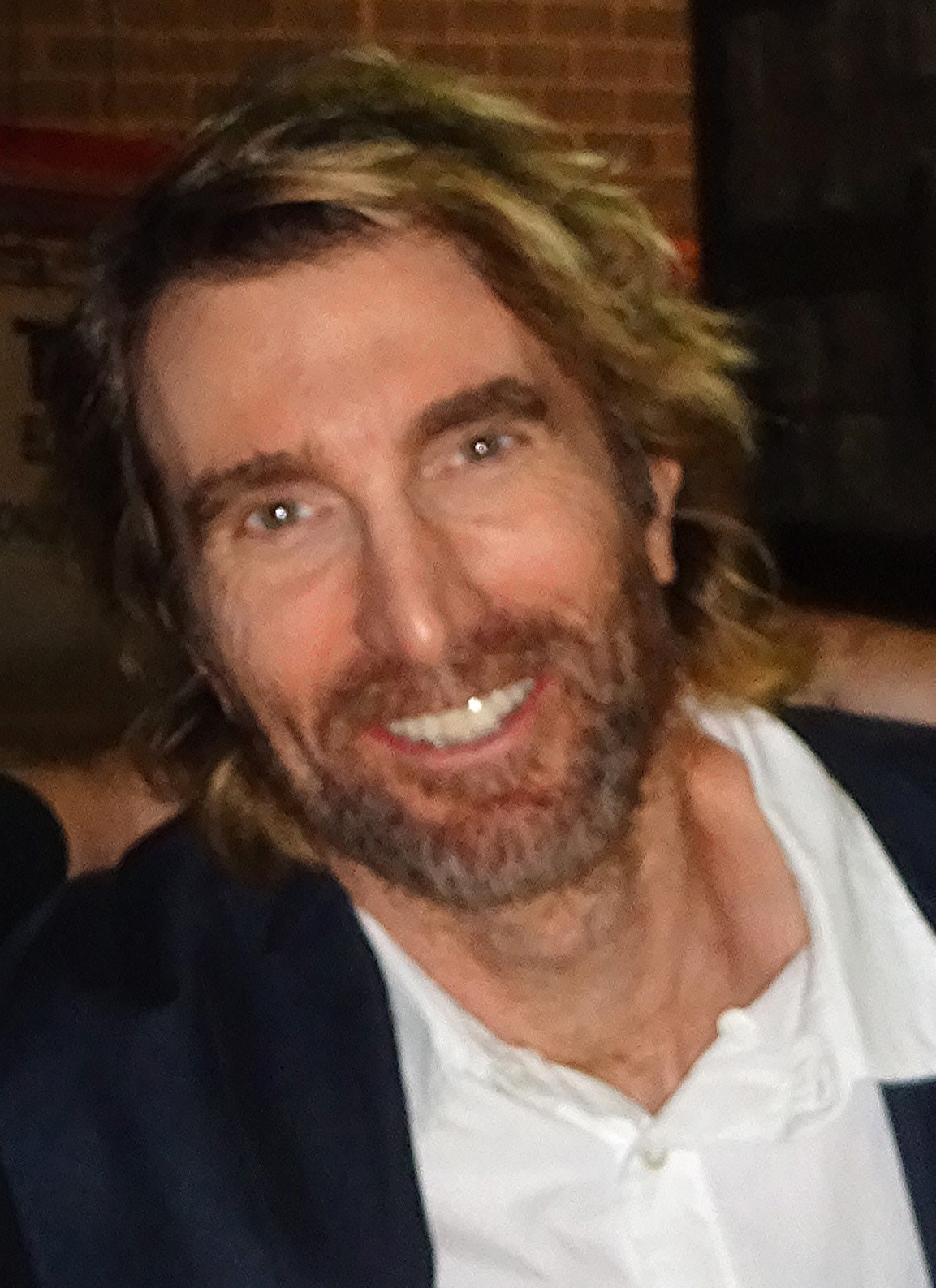
Copley in 2016

Sharlto Copley (born 27 November 1973) is a South African actor. His acting credits include lead roles in the Academy Award-nominated science fiction film District 9; the 2010 adaptation of The A-Team; the science fiction film Elysium; the science fiction horror film Europa Report; the 2014 dark fantasy adventure film Maleficent; and the 2022 thriller Beast. He also played the title character in the 2015 science fiction film Chappie, played Jimmy in the 2015 science fiction action film Hardcore Henry, and starred in two seasons as Christian Walker of the TV series Powers (2015-16). In 2025 he played Leo Bonhart in season 4 of the Netflix TV series The Witcher.

== Early life and education ==
Sharlto Copley was born in Pretoria, Transvaal province, (now Gauteng) South Africa. He attended St. Andrew's Preparatory School in Makhanda and then Redhill School in Morningside, Johannesburg. His father, Bruce Copley, was formerly a university professor. His brother, Donovan, was the lead singer of the Cape Town band Hot Water.

== Career ==
Soon after leaving high school, Copley met Neill Blomkamp, who is six years younger. Copley allowed Blomkamp to use computers at his production company to help the company pitch various projects and allow Blomkamp to pursue his passion and talent for 3D animation and design.

In Blomkamp's District 9 (2009), Copley played the lead role of Wikus van der Merwe, an Afrikaner bureaucrat assigned to move a race of extraterrestrial creatures stranded on Earth. In the film, the aliens, popularly and derogatorily referred to as "prawns", must be moved from District 9, a military-guarded and ghettoised shanty town in Johannesburg, South Africa, to a labour camp outside the city. Copley improvised all of his dialogue. At the 2009 IGN Summer Movie awards, Copley won Favorite Hero and Best Performance.

In 2010, Copley produced, wrote, and directed an insert for the South African Film and Television Awards called "Wikus and Charlize", featuring fellow South African star Charlize Theron. The clip features Copley as Wikus attempting to track down Charlize Theron in Hollywood to help him present the Award for Best Afrikaans Pop album.

Copley then starred alongside Liam Neeson, Bradley Cooper, and Quinton "Rampage" Jackson in the feature film adaptation of The A-Team, which was produced by Ridley Scott and Tony Scott. Copley used a Southern American dialect for his portrayal of A-Team member H. M. Murdock, and employed other dialects, including Scottish, English, Australian and Swahili, as part of the character's rapid-fire style. Dwight Schultz, who played Murdock in the original TV series, praised Copley's performance and said Copley was the only actor he knew of who was "true to his character."

Copley guest-co-hosted WWE Raw on 7 June 2010, along with his A-Team co-stars Cooper and Jackson.

In 2013, Copley played fictional astronaut James Corrigan in Europa Report, the story of a crew of international astronauts sent on a private mission to Jupiter's fourth moon. The same year, Copley portrayed the villain Agent Kruger in Elysium, a science fiction film written and directed by Blomkamp, starring Matt Damon and Jodie Foster.

Copley played villain Adrian Pryce in Spike Lee's Oldboy, a remake of the 2003 South Korean film of the same name. He also starred opposite Angelina Jolie in the 2014 Disney film Maleficent and played King Stefan, Princess Aurora's father. He also provided the voice, reference work, and interaction with the cast as Chappie, the titular character of the 2015 film Chappie, also directed by Neill Blomkamp.

In 2015, Copley was announced to star as Christian Walker in the superhero TV series Powers. He later provided the voiceover for the e-tron GT concept promotional video by Audi Sport GmbH.

Also in 2015, Copley played the supporting character Jimmy in the film Hardcore Henry.

In March 2018, Copley starred in the crime comedy film Gringo as Mitch Rusk. Copley portrayed the titular character of a biographical film about Ted Kaczynski titled Ted K in 2021.

In 2022, he starred in the American thriller Beast, and guest-starred in the TV series Russian Doll.

In 2024, he guest-starred in season 12 of Curb your Enthusiasm, and in 2025, he played Leo Bonhart in season 4 of the Netflix TV series The Witcher.

== Personal life ==
Copley started dating actress and model Tanit Phoenix in January 2012. They wed on 15 February 2016, in Cape Town, and later had a daughter. Copley filed for divorce in June 2023, after the couple had lived apart since 30 October 2021.

== Filmography ==
=== Film ===
Year	Title	Role	Notes
2006	Yellow	Soldier	Short film
2006	Alive in Joburg	Sniper	Short film; also producer
2009	District 9	Wikus van de Merwe	
2010	Wikus and Charlize	Wikus van de Merwe	Short film; also producer, writer and editor
2010	The A-Team	Captain H.M. "Howling Mad" Murdock	
2013	Europa Report	James Corrigan	
2013	Elysium	Agent M. Kruger	
2013	Oldboy	Adrian Pryce	
2013	Open Grave	John Doe / Jonah Cooke	
2014	Maleficent	King Stefan	
2014	The Snow Queen 2	Orm (voice)	English dub
2015	Chappie	Chappie / policeman	
2016	Hardcore Henry	Jimmy	Also executive producer
2016	The Hollars	Ron Hollar	
2016	Free Fire	Vernon	
2017	God: Serengeti	God	Short film
2018	Gringo	Mitch Rusk	
2018	God: City	God	Short film
2020	The Last Days of American Crime	William Sawyer	
2021	Ted K	Ted Kaczynski	Also producer
2021	Seal Team	Switch (voice)	
2022	Beast	Martin Battles	
2023	Boy Kills World	Glen van der Koy	
2024	Monkey Man	Tiger	
2025	Heads of State	Agent Coop	
2025	Desert Warrior	Jalabzeen	
TBA	The Good Samaritan †	Langbore	Filming

=== Television ===
Year	Title	Role	Notes
2015–16	Powers	Christian Walker	Main role; 20 episodes
2022	Russian Doll	Chez	Recurring role (season 2); 3 episodes
2024	Curb Your Enthusiasm	Michael Fouchay	(season 12); 2 episodes
2025	The Witcher	Leo Bonhart	Season 4
2025	The Rats: A Witcher Tale	Leo Bonhart	Netflix Television special

=== Video games ===
Year	Title	Role	Notes	Ref.
2016	Payday 2	Jimmy	Voice and face, reprising role from Hardcore Henry	

=== Web ===
Year	Title	Role	Notes
2016	Rooster Teeth Shorts	Jimmy	Episode: "Hardcore Henry Meets Rooster Teeth"

== Awards and nominations ==
Year	Film	Award	Category	Result	Ref.
2009	District 9	Chicago Film Critics Association Award	Most Promising Performer	Nominated	
2009	District 9	IGN Movie Awards	Favorite Summer Hero	Won	
2009	District 9	Golden Schmoes Awards	Best Actor of the Year	Nominated	
2009	District 9	Golden Schmoes Awards	Breakthrough Performance of the Year	2nd place	
2010	District 9	Empire Award	Best Newcomer	Nominated	
2010	District 9	International Cinephile Society Award	Best Actor	Nominated	
2010	District 9	MTV Movie Award	Best Scared-As-S**t Performance	Nominated	
2010	District 9	Online Film & Television Association	Best Breakthrough Performance - Male	Nominated	
2010	District 9	Online Film Critics Society Award	Best Actor	Nominated	
2010	District 9	Scream Award	Best Science Fiction Actor	Nominated	
2010	District 9	Scream Award	Breakout Performance - Male	Nominated	
2010	District 9	Teen Choice Award	Choice Movie Actor - Sci-Fi	Nominated	
