= Yellow (2006 short film) =

2006 short film by Neill Blomkamp

- Directed by: Neill Blomkamp
- Written by: Terri Tatchell; Neill Blomkamp
- Starring: Julien Phipps; Giddon Karmel; Jason Bell; Jason Lee; Bob Dong; Hamish Cameron; Irene Astle
- Cinematography: Trent Opaloch
- Music by: Gary Pozner
- Release date: 2006
- Running time: 4 minutes
- Language: English

Yellow or Adicolor Yellow is a 2006 futuristic short film by director Neill Blomkamp, written by Terri Tatchell and Blomkamp. It was produced at the request of sportswear maker Adidas as a part of its "Adicolor" viral ads campaign, in which advertising agency IDEALOGUE gathered seven directors, assigning a different color to each of them, and asked them to produce a feature based on their emotional and creative response to the given color, later to be distributed in the form of podcasts.

The four-minute film, shot by Trent Opaloch in Blomkamp's usual handheld camera mockumentary style, deals with an Israeli military robot gone rogue.

== Plot summary ==
The film begins by depicting the development process that eventually results in the creation of the main character. It is explained that in a military robotics laboratory, five androids were created as part of an experiment, each one identified with a different color, but one turned out to be different. The yellow one developed the ability to think and learn, to the point that it escaped the institute in which it had been created and became a part of society for 18 months. Rather than seeing humans as enemies or a threat to its own survival, it was "making decisions, and observing us and learning." A SWAT team is sent after Yellow, chasing him through several countries and finally tracking him down in Shanghai. The film concludes during the encounter between the android and the SWAT team, with a voice over suggesting the birth of a new era, with AI becoming part of our society.

== Production ==
Yellow was written by Terri Tatchell and Neill Blomkamp. Production was done at RSA Production, which is owned by director Ridley Scott. Trent Opaloch, who also worked with Blomkamp on the film District 9, was the Director of Photography. Visual effects were done by Blomkamp's own VFX company Ratel. The score was written by Gary Pozner. The film includes actors Julien Phipps, Giddon Karmel, Jason Bell, Jason Lee, Bob Dong, Hamish Cameron and Irene Astle.
