= Terminus (2007 film) =

2007 Canadian short film

- Directed by: Trevor Cawood
- Written by: Trevor Cawood; Jason Cawood
- Produced by: Robin Hays
- Starring: Rob Carpenter
- Cinematography: Trent Opaloch
- Edited by: Trevor Cawood
- Music by: Clinton Shorter
- Production company: Spy Films
- Release date: September 12, 2007 (TIFF)
- Running time: 8 minutes
- Country: Canada
- Language: English

Terminus is a Canadian black comedy short film, directed by Trevor Cawood and released in 2007. A meditation on urban isolation, the film stars Rob Carpenter as a man who is being followed around the city by a large humanoid creature made of concrete until driven insane.

The film premiered at the 2007 Toronto International Film Festival.

The film was named to the Toronto International Film Festival's annual year-end Canada's Top Ten list for 2007, and won the Golden Sheaf Awards for Drama and Best of Festival at the 2008 Yorkton Film Festival.
