= Trevor Cawood =

Canadian filmmaker (born 1974)

Trevor Cawood (born March 27, 1974) is a Canadian filmmaker and visual effects artist, most noted as a two-time Emmy Award nominee for Outstanding Special Visual Effects.

Originally from Regina, Saskatchewan, he was educated at the University of Regina before moving to Vancouver, British Columbia, to study special effects at the Art Institute of Vancouver. He received his first Emmy nomination in 1999 for the television film Max Q, and his second in 2001 for the pilot episode of the television series Dark Angel.

In 2007 he released the short film Terminus, which was named to the Toronto International Film Festival's year-end Canada's Top Ten list, and won the Golden Sheaf Awards for Drama and Best of Festival at the 2008 Yorkton Film Festival.
