= Terri Tatchell =

Canadian screenwriter (born 1978)

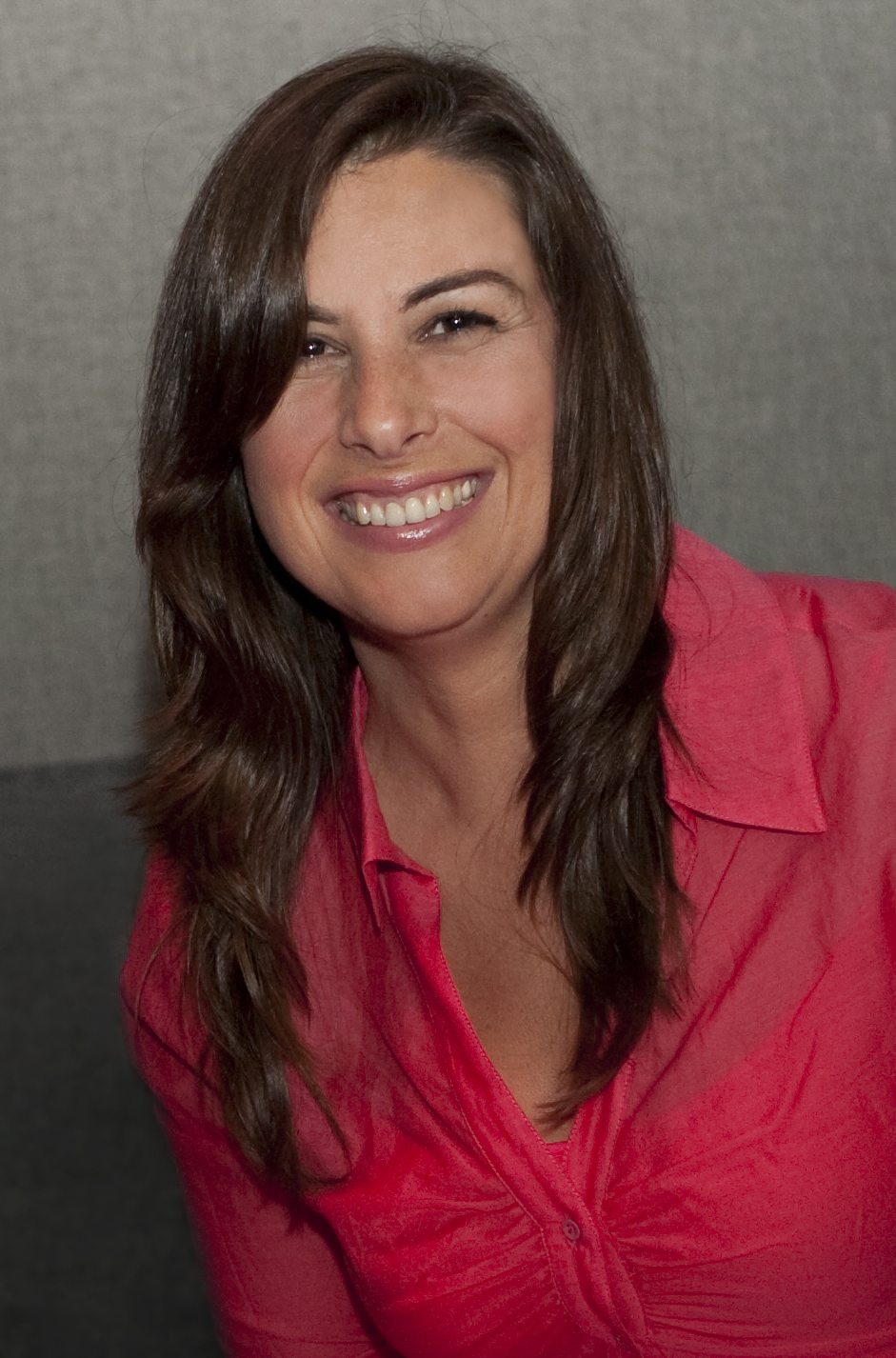
- Tatchell in October 2009
- Born: Toronto, Ontario, Canada
- Occupations: Screenwriter, children's writer
- Years active: 2006–present
- Spouse: Neill Blomkamp

Terri Tatchell is a Canadian screenwriter and writer of children's books. She is best known for co-writing, with her husband Neill Blomkamp, the screenplay of District 9, which was nominated for Best Adapted Screenplay at the 82nd Academy Awards.

== Early life and education ==
Terri Tatchell was born in Toronto, Ontario, Canada.

She graduated in 2001 from the Vancouver Film School's Writing for Film and Television program.

== Career ==
=== Film ===
Tatchell began her screenwriting career in 2006 with theIDEALOGUE short action film Yellow (aka Adicolor Yellow) under the direction of her husband, Neill Blomkamp.

In 2008, Tatchell wrote, with Blomkamp, the screenplay of the science-fiction film District 9, which was released in 2009.

She also wrote for Chappie (2015) and Zygote (2017).

=== Books ===
Tatchell has written a series of picture book for children, called Endangered and Misunderstood series. Each book in the series features a lesser-known endangered animal.

== Recognition ==
Tatchell's work on District 9 garnered a number of awards nominations, including an Academy Award nomination for Best Adapted Screenplay and the Saturn Awards.

She won the 2009 Bradbury Award from the Science Fiction and Fantasy Writers of America for her work on the screenplay.

== Filmography ==
- Yellow (2006)
- District 9 (2009)
- Chappie (2015)
- Zygote (2017)
