= Oats Studios =

Independent film studio

- Oats Studios logo
- Industry: Entertainment
- Founders: Neill Blomkamp; Mike Blomkamp
- Headquarters: Richmond, British Columbia, Canada
- Key people: Chris Harvey; (VFX Supervisor); Richard Simpson; (Production Designer); Mike Blomkamp; (Executive Producer)
- Products: Theatrical short films
- Website: oatsstudios.com

Oats Studios is an independent film studio started in 2017 by Oscar-nominated South African filmmaker Neill Blomkamp. The studio was created with the goal of distributing experimental short films via YouTube and Steam in order to gauge the community for interest and feedback as to which of them are viable for expansion into feature films. Actors featured in the films include Sigourney Weaver, Carly Pope, Sharlto Copley, Jason Cope, Kellan Lutz, Michael Rogers, Jose Pablo Cantillo, and Dakota Fanning.

== Short films ==
=== Rakka ===
A race of ruthless reptilian aliens have invaded the Earth and enslaved humanity through brute force and telepathy. The survivors, led by a woman named Jasper (Sigourney Weaver) are fighting a losing battle, but are able to turn the tide with the help of an angelic, messianic species and a mute precognitive.

Released: June 14, 2017

=== Cooking with Bill ===
A series of black comedy parodies of late-night cooking infomercials, starring a hapless presenter named Bill. The products he demonstrates all end up producing a disgusting product which he then consumes, or malfunctioning and maiming him.

Released: June 20, 2017

=== Firebase ===
Archive footage from the Vietnam War in 1969 shows 15,212 soldiers and 2,425 military vehicles being levitated into the air and destroyed by an unknown force. The insides of several deceased Viet Cong are also transformed into hard, insect-like shells. The incident is immediately classified, and dubbed the "Omega Event" by the Central Intelligence Agency.

In 1970, Sgt. Hines attacks and kills what appears to be a reanimated US Army soldier, but beneath the skin, they turn out to be an insect-like creature as well. He is then collected by CIA agent Jacob Palmer, who transports him to Firebase Quatro, a military field hospital on the border with Cambodia. En route, Palmer reveals the mysterious events were caused by an extremely powerful entity dubbed The River God, whom Hines has been tracking down for some time. The two arrive at the base, where they interview Cpl. Bracken, one of the only survivors of the River God's attacks. Bracken recalls that his unit encountered the River God during a skirmish with Viet Cong forces at Firebase Tarheel. Upon locking eyes with the entity, he was immediately teleported to an airfield in Charleston, South Carolina, where he and several other soldiers were attacked and set on fire by experimental Soviet fighter jets. He then reappeared back to the jungles of Vietnam, still on fire, where his teammates helped put out the flames. Before retreating, he recalls that the River God reanimated his fallen comrades.

Later that night, Palmer talks with Hines, and recounts several stories from the sergeant's teammates where they say he appears to be protected by some sort of divine intervention, as if the universe has a set plan for him. It is then revealed that the River God was once an ordinary Vietnamese fisherman, an innocent within the conflict, whose wife and children were killed in an attack on his village. Overcome by grief, he gained the ability to warp reality and space-time, raining havoc on both sides as he made his way down the Mekong Delta. An invincible skeletal figure, his skin burned off by napalm, he now uses his unwavering power to transform the world into his own personal hell. As Firebase Quatro prepares to move out and engage with the River God, Hines is presented with an experimental railgun and a backpack apparatus dubbed the "relativity capsule". It generates a magnetic field around him, preventing the River God from warping his immediate reality and allowing him to function whilst fighting him. Armed with this new arsenal, Hines prepares himself to fight what he and many of the other soldiers have come to view as the Devil.

Released: June 28, 2017

=== God ===
A series featuring God (Sharlto Copley) and his butler (Jason Cope), who interact with miniature humans and animals laid out before them on a platform while commentating and reacting to what they are doing.

Released: July 6, 2017

=== Zygote ===
Twenty years ago, a smattering of large, mineral-rich asteroids crashed into northern Canada and Russia. At a remote mining outpost operated by Cerberus Minerals in the Northwest Territories, an anomalous, crystalline alien object described as the "quartz" has been recovered from one of the asteroids. The quartz, apparently sentient, cognitively affects humans by transmitting gigabytes of information via bursts of light, influencing them to assimilate organisms to construct it a suitable body to inhabit. One personnel member afflicted by the light (known as "Holebrook") used the organs of livestock to create such organisms before proceeding to construct a larger creature from the bodies of numerous deceased personnel. The creature killed him and eventually all but two of the 98 personnel, absorbing the bodies and memories of the remaining non-synthetic humans.

The two survivors, human security guard John Quinn (Jose Pablo Cantillo), and "Canary Class" synthetic labourer Barklay (Dakota Fanning) prepare to venture to the fortified corporate facility of the outpost, having run out of food and water in their section. Quinn, blinded by an encounter with the alien light, trains Barklay on how to use his rifle. The two make it to the corporate section, but are closely followed by the creature, who has absorbed the necessary biometrics to also gain access. Taking cover in a kitchen, Quinn refuses to go on, concerned that the alien influence from when he looked into the light has compromised him. He reveals to Barklay that she is not a synthetic, but an orphan purchased by the company as a cheaper alternative to synthetic labour, and cuts off his finger so that she will have the necessary biometric to enter the corporate bunker. He is then killed by the creature, which absorbs his knowledge of where Barklay is heading.

Barklay eventually makes it to the bunker while being pursued by the creature, but Quinn's fingerprint is deemed to have insufficient security clearance status to allow entry. Confronted by the creature, she opens fire and briefly incapacitates it, then cuts some hands from its body, with one belonging to the former CFO eventually granting her access. Traumatized, and with the creature regaining consciousness outside and attempting to break down the door, Barklay contemplates her next move.

Released: July 12, 2017

=== Kapture: Fluke ===
A parody of various tech-related test shows, such as MythBusters and Top Gear, the film consists of test footage for the private weapons manufacturer Kapture. It follows Gary and Jeff, two over-excited scientists testing their newest invention dubbed 'the Fluke'. The weapon is described as a base station and transformer unit that work together, with the transformer being able to be fired from any conventional variant of shotgun.

Before the two test the weapon, Gary announces to the camera that they have a special deal with the US Department of Defense and the US Bureau of Prisons, which enables them to use human prisoners as test subjects. The subject, Mike, is escorted into the testing facility where he is informed that he is likely to survive the test, and thus will get a reduced sentence. However, the two scientists note privately closer to the camera he is unlikely to do so.

Mike is shot with the transmitter, which embeds in his leg. Jeff then activates the neural connection, which allows the two scientists complete control over Mike's body, complete with cerebral capture allowing them to see what his eyes do. They briefly demonstrate the devices ability to control the subjects, walking a now comatose Mike around the facility. They then direct him into a structure standing in for enemy headquarters, before activating the transmitter's self destruct system which blows up the structure, killing Mike and damaging the plexiglas screen in front of them. The two scientists are shown to be jovial and elated at the success of the product.

Released: August 3, 2017

=== ADAM: Episode 2 (The Mirror) ===
A group of criminal androids, including one named Adam, follow a mysterious cloaked android figure through a desert peppered with large oil fires. As a sandstorm sets in, one female android becomes heavily damaged, and despite the others best efforts, does not make it. The rest of the group eventually make it to an abandoned facility, guarded by other androids, and escape from the storm.

Once inside, the cloaked figure details how human residents live inside a walled city run by an organisation known as The Consortium. Those who are convicted of felony crimes have their bodies and organs harvested, used to benefit other citizens. Their brains, the only part of their bodies that are "tainted", are placed within cheap android shells and expelled into the wasteland beyond the walls. The reason this is done is unknown. The cloaked android also reveals their memories are wiped, but introduces them to a human-android hybrid named ‘The Mirror’, who can read traces of who they were before their transformation.

The mirror approaches Adam, and reveals that he was convicted for treason and terrorism within the Takoma Walled City, deducing that he was a political dissident. After hearing this, the cloaked android moves to confront him.

Released: October 3, 2017

=== Bad President ===
In an alternate timeline Arizona State alumnus William "Billy" Coltran became president of the United States. He was here to party.

Released: November 11, 2020

=== Praetoria ===
Praetoria is a huge galactic story by Oats Studios.

Released: November 3, 2017

=== Lima ===
A short film exploring the ideas of multinational corporations, secret government programs and failed scientific experiments.

Released: November 14, 2017

=== Gdansk ===
Gdansk is the first in a series of medieval giants.

Released: November 21, 2017
