= Neill Blomkamp =

South African-Canadian filmmaker (born 1979)

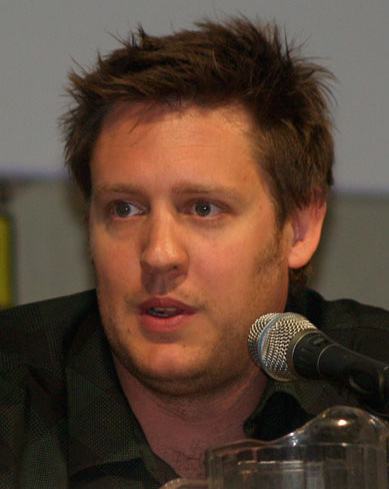
- Blomkamp in 2009
- Born: 17 September 1979 (age 47); Johannesburg, South Africa
- Citizenship: Canada
- Occupations: Film director; screenwriter; producer
- Years active: 1996–present
- Spouse: Terri Tatchell

Neill Blomkamp (Afrikaans: [ˈnil ˈblɔmkamp]; born 17 September 1979) is a South African-born Canadian film director and screenwriter. He is best known as the co-writer and director of the science fiction action film District 9 (2009), for which he was nominated for the Academy Award for Best Adapted Screenplay. He also directed the dystopian science fiction action film Elysium (2013), the science fiction action film Chappie (2015), and the sports drama film Gran Turismo (2023). He is known for his collaborations with actor Sharlto Copley, who played the lead in District 9.

== Early life and education ==
Neill Blomkamp was born on 17 September 1979 in Johannesburg, then in Transvaal province of South Africa, and grew up under the apartheid regime, which affected his world view and creative vision. His parents gave him a computer when he was 14, which led to experimentation with special effects.

At the age of 16, he met Sharlto Copley, who provided Blomkamp with the use of computers at his production company, Deadtime, for Blomkamp to pursue his passion and talent for 3D animation and design. In return, Blomkamp assisted Copley in creating 3D work for pitches on various projects.

Blomkamp was 18 when he moved to Vancouver, Canada, with his family, where he studied film at the Vancouver Film School.

== Career ==
=== Early works ===
In the late 1990s, he started working in the film industry as a visual effects artist and 3D animator. His animation credits include Stargate SG-1 (1998), First Wave (1998), Mercy Point (1998) and Aftershock: Earthquake in New York (1999). In 2000, he garnered his first role of lead animator for Dark Angel (2000). He was the lead 3D animator for 3000 Miles to Graceland (2001).

In 2003, he was hired to illustrate photo-realistic future aircraft for Popular Science's "Next Century in Aviation". In 2004, he illustrated "The Future of the Automobile". Blomkamp worked as a visual effects artist at The Embassy Visual Effects in Vancouver as well as at Rainmaker Digital Effects, and was signed by Toronto commercial house Spy Films. In 2007, to promote the release of Halo 3, Blomkamp directed a trilogy of live-action short films set in the Halo universe, known collectively as Landfall.

Blomkamp was then slated to direct his first feature-length film, an adaptation of the Halo series of video games, produced by Peter Jackson. Jackson came to know of Blomkamp after viewing a reel of his commercial work and shorts, shot in his off time. The four shorts that got him noticed included: Tetra Vaal, a faux advertisement for a third-world police robot that established Blomkamp's signature style of mixing lo-fi production with seamless CGI; Alive in Joburg, a gritty mockumentary about extraterrestrials marooned in Johannesburg; Tempbot, an Office Space-esque spoof; and Yellow, a short film based on the colour yellow for Adidas' "Adicolor" campaign by digital studio IDEALOGUE, which portrays a globe-trotting android gone rogue. Blomkamp has admitted since that the Halo pre-production was a nightmare, and relations between 20th Century Fox and him severely disintegrated before the project's end.

=== Sci-fi trilogy ===
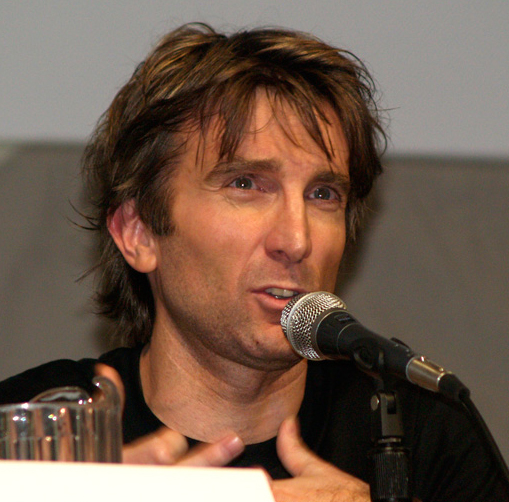
Actor Sharlto Copley, who played the lead in District 9

When funding for the Halo film collapsed, Peter Jackson decided to produce District 9 instead, an adaptation of Blomkamp's earlier short film Alive in Joburg, which had been produced by Simon Hansen and Copley. The film, directed by Blomkamp, starring Copley, and co-written with Blomkamp's wife and production partner Terri Tatchell, was released in mid-August 2009 by TriStar Pictures to widespread critical acclaim and became a box office success, earning $210 million worldwide. District 9 was later nominated for the 2010 Academy Award for Best Picture, along with nominations for Best Visual Effects, Editing, and Adapted Screenplay.

In October 2010, a video released on the iPad version of Wired Magazine was credited to Neill Blomkamp. It shows an amateur recording of two young men who find a dead mutated creature in a puddle of mud while driving down a countryside road. The creature, a dog-sized mix between a pig and a lizard, presents a tattooed seal on its side that reads "18.12 AGM Heartland Pat. Pend. USA". "AGM Heartland" was trademarked for its use in an entertainment-oriented website. On 20 February 2012, a 23-second video clip titled "IS IT DEAD?" appeared on YouTube, featuring Yolandi Visser, of the South African group Die Antwoord, crouching over the creature. Blomkamp admitted that he was still interested in making a Halo film in April 2013.

After Elysium, he started work on his next sci-fi film, Chappie, in April 2013. The film was based on his own short, Tetra Vaal. Blomkamp directed and Sony Pictures Entertainment (Columbia Pictures) and Media Rights Capital co-produced and co-financed the film, which was released March 2015.

Сollectively, District 9, Elysium, and Chappie are sometimes referred to as a film trilogy that shares distinctive aesthetics and social themes.

=== Unfulfilled projects and short films ===
In early 2015, Blomkamp posted several pictures to his Instagram page that showed concept art for an Alien film he might have been working on. Included in the art is Ripley and Hicks, a ship bearing resemblance to The Derelict from the 1979 Alien, and a concept Xenomorph. In a February 2015 interview with Collider, he stated that he planned the Alien sequel with Sigourney Weaver in the lead role as Ellen Ripley. On 18 February 2015, Blomkamp himself confirmed that the Alien film will be his next project. In March 2015, he confirmed that he planned more than one sequel to the Alien franchise. The project was shelved in October 2015, pending the outcome of Ridley Scott's second prequel installment, Alien: Covenant. In January 2017, a fan on Twitter asked Blomkamp about the outlook of the film going into production, he responded by saying they were "slim". On 1 May 2017, its title had been revealed to be Alien: Awakening. Ridley Scott confirmed Blomkamp's film had been officially canceled. Fans of the franchise started a petition to help save Blomkamp's cancelled film. Since then, there have been no further developments.

In March 2015, it was reported that Blomkamp would produce the feature film remake of Ruairi Robinson's short The Leviathan, with Robinson directing, Jim Uhls set to write the spec screenplay and Simon Kinberg attached to produce the film for 20th Century Fox.

In November 2015, it was announced that Blomkamp would be working on adapting the forthcoming Tom Sweterlitsch novel The Gone World, described as a "sci-fi time travel" concept, but the film was either subsequently scrapped or stuck in "development hell," with production never going forward.

In 2017, Blomkamp announced the creation of his own film production company, Oats Studios, and confirmed a series of experimental short films and other content titled Oats Studios Volume 1 to be released via Steam. The films will also be available for free streaming on YouTube. These films are distributed to gauge interest in a certain theme, with the intention to expand them into a feature film if deemed viable. The first short, an alien invasion-themed film co-written with Sweterlitsch, is titled Rakka.

In April 2018, it was reported that Blomkamp was to direct the feature film remake of his short Firebase, but canceled it due to a failed crowdfunding campaign.

In July 2018, Blomkamp announced that he would be directing a new entry in the RoboCop film series for Metro-Goldwyn-Mayer. The film was to be adapted from a previously unproduced spec script written in the late 1980s by Edward Neumeier and Michael Miner, the writers of the first film, who were slated to executive produce the film. Tentatively titled RoboCop Returns, the film was to serve as a direct sequel to the first film, ignoring 1990's RoboCop 2 and 1993's RoboCop 3, as well as the 2014 remake. On 15 August 2019, Blomkamp announced on Twitter that he is no longer directing RoboCop Returns as he is focusing on directing a horror movie instead.

In October 2019, it was reported that Blomkamp was to direct Taylor Kitsch in a film project titled Inferno.

=== Return to larger projects ===
In December 2020, it was revealed that Blomkamp had secretly shot a supernatural horror film, Demonic, in British Columbia during the summer of 2020 amidst the COVID-19 pandemic.

In August 2021, it was confirmed that the sequel to District 9 was in the works but that the script was still under development. In 2022, it was announced that he would direct the sports film Gran Turismo based on the video game series and the true story of Jann Mardenborough, a teenage Gran Turismo player that later would become an actual racing driver.

In April 2023, Blomkamp was set to direct the science fiction thriller film They Found Us, with Joel Kinnaman attached to star. However, due to funding issues, the production halted in October 2023. In November 2024, Julius Avery replaced Blomkamp as director.

In March 2025, Columbia Pictures tapped Blomkamp to write and direct an adaptation of Robert A. Heinlein's military science fiction novel Starship Troopers. In April 2025, he is also reportedly working on an adaptation of Peter Watts's novel Blindsight. On July 20, 2026, he released an AI-generated short-film called Nightborne on YouTube. It was adapted from the 2014 novel Echopraxia, also by Watts. The AI generated short film received an overwhelmingly negative reception.

== Style ==
Blomkamp employs a documentary-style, hand-held, cinéma vérité technique, blending naturalistic and photo-realistic computer-generated visual effects, and his films often deal with themes of xenophobia and social segregation.

== Video games ==
In 2020, Blomkamp joined Gunzilla Games as co-founder and Chief Creative Officer. He began work on Off the Grid and the game went into early access on October 8, 2024. His company acquired Game Informer from GameStop, restarting its publication after seven months.

== Personal life ==
Blomkamp is a naturalised Canadian citizen.

He married screenwriter Terri Tatchell.

== Filmography ==
=== Feature film ===
Year	Title	Director	Writer	Producer
2009	District 9	Yes	Yes	No
2013	Elysium	Yes	Yes	Yes
2015	Chappie	Yes	Yes	Yes
2021	Demonic	Yes	Yes	Yes
2023	Gran Turismo	Yes	No	No

=== Video commercials ===
Year	Title	Brand
2003	Crab	Nike
2004	Alive with Technology	Citroën C4
2006	Rain	Gatorade

=== Short film ===
Year	Title	Director	Writer	Notes
2004	Tetra Vaal	Yes	No	Also editor and producer
2005	Alive in Joburg	Yes	Uncredited	Also visual effects
2006	Tempbot	Yes	No	
2006	Yellow	Yes	No	Also visual effects
2007	Halo: Landfall	Yes	No	
2016	The Escape	Yes	Yes	
2017	Rakka	Yes	Yes	
2017	Firebase	Yes	Yes	
2017	God: Serengeti	Yes	Yes	
2017	God: City	Yes	Yes	
2017	Cooking with Bill: Damasu 950	Yes	No	Also producer
2017	Cooking with Bill: Sushi	Yes	Yes	Also producer
2017	Cooking with Bill: PrestoVeg	Yes	No	Also producer
2017	Cooking with Bill: Smoothie	Yes	No	Also producer
2017	Zygote	Yes	Yes	
2017	Kapture: Fluke	Yes	Yes	
2017	ADAM: The Mirror	Yes	Yes	
2017	Praetoria	Yes	Yes	
2017	Gdansk	Yes	Yes	
2017	Lima	Yes	Yes	
2022	Off the Grid - Switcher Part 1	Yes	No	
2026	Nightborne	Yes	No	Based on Echopraxia AI-generated

=== Other roles ===
Year	Title	Role	Notes
1998	Stargate SG-1	3D animator	
1998	First Wave	3D animator	
1998	Mercy Point	3D animator	
1999	Aftershock: Earthquake in New York	3D animator	Uncredited
2000	Dark Angel	Lead animator	Uncredited
2001	3000 Miles to Graceland	Lead 3D animator	
2008	Crossing the Line	Additional director	
2025	Ash	Executive producer	

== Recognition and awards ==
- 2004: Cannes Lions International Advertising Festival - "Saatchi & Saatchi New Directors Showcase"
- 2004: Named by First Boards Awards as "One of the top five directors to watch"
- 2004: Shortlisted, Shark Awards
- 2005: Winner, Visual Effects Society Awards 2005 "Outstanding VFX in a commercial", for Citroën - Alive with technology
- 2008: Winner, Grand Prix, Cannes Lions, for Halo: Combat
- 2009: Nominated, Golden Globe Award for Best Screenplay, for District 9
- 2009: Nominated,Satellite Award for Best Director & Satellite Award for Best Adapted Screenplay, District 9
- 2009: Winner, Bradbury Award from the Science Fiction and Fantasy Writers of America, for District 9
- 2009: Named by Time as one of the 100 Most Influential People of the year
- 2010: Nominated, Academy Award for Best Adapted Screenplay and Academy Award for Best Picture 2009, for District 9 (written by Neill Blomkamp and Terri Tatchell)
- 2011: Named by Forbes as the 21st most powerful celebrity from Africa

=== Critical reception ===
Critical, public, and commercial reception to films Blomkamp has directed:

Film	Rotten Tomatoes	Metacritic	CinemaScore	Budget	Box office
District 9	90%	81	B	$30 million	$210.8 million
Elysium	65%	61	B	$115 million	$286.1 million
Chappie	32%	41	B	$49 million	$102.1 million
Demonic	15%	34	—N/a	$1.5 million	$136,069
Gran Turismo	65%	48	A	$60 million	$122.1 million
