= District 9 =

2009 film by Neill Blomkamp

- Theatrical release poster
- Directed by: Neill Blomkamp
- Written by: Neill Blomkamp; Terri Tatchell
- Based on: Alive in Joburg (Note: Despite the film being based on the short film, and the Academy of Motion Picture Arts and Sciences recognizing the film as an adaptation of said short, the film itself never mentions being based on it.) by Neill Blomkamp
- Produced by: Peter Jackson; Carolynne Cunningham
- Starring: Sharlto Copley; Jason Cope; David James; Vanessa Haywood; Mandla Gaduka; Kenneth Nkosi; Eugene Khumbanyiwa; Louis Minnaar; William Allen Young
- Cinematography: Trent Opaloch
- Edited by: Julian Clarke
- Music by: Clinton Shorter
- Production companies: QED International; WingNut Films
- Distributed by: TriStar Pictures (English-speaking territories, through Sony Pictures Releasing); QED International (International)
- Release dates: 23 July 2009 (SDCC); 13 August 2009 (New Zealand); 14 August 2009 (United States)
- Running time: 112 minutes
- Countries: New Zealand; United States; South Africa
- Language: English
- Budget: $30 million
- Box office: $210.8 million

District 9 is a 2009 science fiction action film directed and co-written by Neill Blomkamp. The film stars Sharlto Copley, Jason Cope, and David James, and was adapted from Blomkamp's 2005 short film Alive in Joburg. The film is partially presented in a mockumentary format by featuring fictional interviews, news footage, and video from surveillance cameras. It begins in an alternate 1982, when an alien spaceship appears over Johannesburg, South Africa. When a population of diseased and malnourished insectile and crustaceous aliens are discovered on the ship, the South African government confines the asylum seekers to an internment camp called District 9. The title and premise of District 9 were predominantly inspired by events in Cape Town's District Six during the apartheid era. The film explores themes of humanity, racism, xenophobia, residential segregation, geographical segregation, and medical torture.

District 9 premiered on 23 July 2009 at San Diego Comic-Con, and was released in New Zealand on 13 August, the United States on 14 August and South Africa on 28 August, by TriStar Pictures. It received positive reviews from critics and was a commercial success, earning $211 million on a budget of $30 million. It garnered numerous award nominations, including Academy Awards for Best Picture, Best Adapted Screenplay, Best Visual Effects, and Best Film Editing.

== Plot ==
In 1982, an extraterrestrial mothership arrives and hovers over Johannesburg, South Africa. Inside, an investigation team finds countless starved insectoid and crustacean-like aliens and the South African government voluntarily relocates the asylum seekers to a refugee camp called District 9. 28 years later, District 9 becomes a ghettoised shanty town, and humans come to view the aliens, derogatorily called "prawns," as filthy, violent animals who bleed resources from them. The Prawns have been systematically reduced to second-class citizens there and have been known to consume canned cat food.

Following unrest between the aliens and humans, the government hires the Multinational United (MNU), a large defense contractor, to forcibly relocate the extraterrestrials to a labour camp outside the city. Piet Smit, an MNU executive, appoints his son-in-law and MNU bureaucrat, Wikus van de Merwe, to lead the forced relocation. Meanwhile, three aliens, Christopher Johnson, his young son CJ, and Paul search a District 9 refuse dump for Prawn technology; Christopher has spent the last 20 years synthesizing fuel from their contents. They finally fill an entire container in Paul's shack as the relocation begins, but when Wikus comes to serve Paul a notice, he finds the hidden container. Wikus inspects it and accidentally sprays a black fluid into his face. Koobus Venter, a cruel MNU mercenary, kills Paul.

Wikus begins mutating into a Prawn, starting with his left arm that was injured after the exposure. He is taken to an underground MNU lab, where researchers discover his hybrid DNA grants Wikus the ability to operate Prawn weaponry, which is biologically restricted from humans. When there, Wikus discovers grisly medical experiments, including vivisections, the scientists have performed on Prawns. Seeing the potential for weapons development, Smit orders Wikus's organs be harvested for genetic material. Wikus, however, overpowers the lab personnel and escapes. While Venter's forces hunt him, news is broadcast claiming Wikus is a wanted fugitive, who has contracted a contagious disease from copulating with extraterrestrials.

Wikus takes refuge in District 9, finding Christopher and the spaceship's command module dropship concealed underneath his shack. Christopher explains that the confiscated fuel is needed to reactivate the dropship, which can then dock with the mothership. This would allow Christopher to rescue his species and return home, and cure Wikus with the equipment onboard. Encouraged by a phone call from his wife, Tania, Wikus steals powerful alien weapons from Obasanjo, a Nigerian crime lord who believes that eating Wikus' alien arm will grant him alien abilities.

Wikus and Christopher attack MNU headquarters and retrieve the fuel from the underground lab, where Christopher is horrified by the vivisections and other brutal medical experiments the MNU has performed on his species. Returning to the shack, Christopher decides that he must leave Earth immediately and return with help, therefore he must postpone curing Wikus's condition for up to three years. Unsatisfied with that answer, Wikus knocks Christopher unconscious and attempts to fly the module to the mothership, but Venter has it shot down. Venter captures Wikus and Christopher, but Obasanjo's gang ambushes them and abducts Wikus.

CJ, who remained hidden in the dropship, remotely activates the mother ship and a mecha alien battle suit in Obasanjo's base. The mecha suit guns down the Nigerian gangsters; Wikus enters the mecha suit and attempts to escape on his own. However, when he overhears Venter's order to kill Christopher, Wikus has a change of heart and returns to rescue Christopher from the mercenaries. Heading towards the dropship, the two come under heavy fire; Wikus decides to stay behind and fend off the mercenaries, buying time for Christopher and CJ to escape. Christopher promises to return and cure Wikus. After all of the other mercenaries are killed, Venter finally cripples the mecha suit, but several Prawns kill and dismember him before he can summarily execute Wikus. Christopher makes it into the dropship with CJ, and the dropship is lifted via a tractor beam back into the mothership, which finally leaves Earth.

Wikus disappears, the MNU's medical experiments are exposed to the public, and the aliens are moved to a labour camp called District 10. Tania finds a handcrafted metal flower on her doorstep, giving her hope that Wikus is still alive. Wikus, now fully transformed into a Prawn, is shown in a wrecking yard crafting more flowers for his wife.

== Cast ==
- Sharlto Copley as Wikus van de Merwe, a mild-mannered, shy, bumbling, awkward bureaucrat at the MNU Department of Alien Affairs, who becomes infected with an alien fluid, slowly turning him into one of the "prawns". This was the first time acting professionally in a feature film for Copley, a friend of director Blomkamp.
- Jason Cope as Christopher "Chris" Johnson, a District 9 prawn who assists Wikus in fighting MNU.
  - Cope also played UKNR Chief Correspondent Grey Bradnam and all the aliens
- David James as Colonel Koobus Venter, an aggressive, sadistic, and speciesist private military company (PMC) mercenary-soldier sent to capture Wikus. He is shown as taking pleasure in killing the aliens and responding brutally to anyone who opposes him.
- Vanessa Haywood as Tania Smit-van de Merwe, Wikus's wife.
- Mandla Gaduka as Fundiswa Mhlanga, Wikus's assistant and trainee during the eviction
- Eugene Wanangwa Khumbanyiwa as Obesandjo, a paralyzed psychopathic Nigerian crime boss who believes that eating alien body parts will enable him to operate their weapons
- Louis Minnaar as Piet Smit, managing director of MNU South Africa and Wikus's father-in-law
- Kenneth Nkosi as Thomas, an MNU security guard and good friend of Wikus
- William Allen Young as Dirk Michaels, the CEO of MNU
- Nathalie Boltt as Sarah Livingstone, a sociologist at Kempton Park University
- Sylvaine Strike as Katrina McKenzie, a doctor from the Department of Social Assistance
- John Sumner as Les Feldman, a MIL engineer
- Nick Blake as Francois Moraneu, a member of the CIV Engineer Team
- Jed Brophy as James Hope, an officer with the South African Police Service (SAPS) Alien Crimes Unit
- Vittorio Leonardi as Michael Bloemstein, MNU Department of Alien Civil Affairs
- Johan van Schoor as Nicolaas van de Merwe, Wikus's father
- Marian Hooman as Sandra van de Merwe, Wikus's mother
- Jonathan Taylor as the Doctor
- Stella Steenkamp as Phyllis Sinderson, MNU Alien Relations
- Tim Gordon as Clive Henderson, an entomologist at WLG University
- Nick Boraine as Lieutenant Weldon, Colonel Venter's right-hand man
- Robert Hobbs as Ross Pienaar, an MNU mercenary
- Trevor Coppola as MNU Mercenary
- Morne Erasmus as MNU Medic

== Themes ==
Like Alive in Joburg, the short film on which the feature film is based, the setting of District 9 is largely inspired by historical events under the apartheid system, particularly alluding to District Six, an inner-city residential area in Cape Town, declared a "whites only" area by the government in 1966, with 60,000 people forcibly removed to Cape Flats, 25 km (16 miles) away. The film also refers to contemporary evictions and forced removals to suburban ghettos in post-apartheid South Africa, as well as the resistance of its residents. This includes the high-profile attempted forced removal of the Joe Slovo informal settlement in Cape Town to temporary relocation areas in Delft, plus evictions in the shack settlement Chiawelo, where the film was actually shot. Blikkiesdorp, a temporary relocation area in Cape Town, has also been compared with the District 9 camp, earning a front-page spread in the Daily Voice.

Dr. Shohini Chauduri wrote that District 9 even echoes apartheid in its title, as it is reminiscent "of District 6 in Cape Town, declared a whites-only area under the Group Areas Act". She also discusses how the wide shots used in District 9 strongly emphasize the idea of exclusion under apartheid. The segregation of people and "prawns" into human and extraterrestrial zones marks South Africa's social divisions.

The film emphasizes the irony of Wikus and the impact of his experiences on his personality, which shows him becoming more humane as he becomes less biologically human. The film uses his story to pose the question of humanity as the "prawn" characters in the film are shown to be kinder to Wikus than the actual humans are as he undergoes his transformation. The film also features the portrayal of Nigerian arms dealers, provoking thought on conflict between marginalized communities. Chris Mikesell from the University of Hawaii newspaper Ka Leo writes that "Substitute 'black,' 'Asian,' 'Mexican,' 'illegal,' 'Jew,' 'white,' or any number of different labels for the word 'prawn' in this film and you will hear the hidden truth behind the dialogue".

Themes of racism and xenophobia are shown in the form of speciesism. Used to describe the aliens, the word "prawn" is a reference to the Parktown prawn, a king cricket species considered a pest in South Africa. Copley has said that the theme is not intended to be the main focus of the work, but can work at a subconscious level even if it is not noticed. The speciesism in the film is portrayed on an institutional level, despite the brutality against the aliens by MNU exposed to the public, they are still relocated as originally planned.

Duane Dudek of the Journal Sentinel wrote that "The result is an action film about xenophobia, in which all races of humans are united in their dislike and mistrust of an insect-like species".

Another underlying theme in District 9 is states' reliance on multinational corporations (whose accountability is unclear and whose interests are not necessarily congruent with democratic principles) as a form of government-funded enforcement. As the MNU represents the type of corporation that partners with governments, the negative portrayal of the MNU in the film depicts the dangers of outsourcing militaries and bureaucracies to private contractors.

== Production ==
=== Development ===
Producer Peter Jackson planned to produce a film adaptation based on the Halo video game franchise with first-time director Neill Blomkamp. Due to a lack of financing, the Halo adaptation was placed on hold. Jackson and Blomkamp discussed pursuing alternative projects and eventually chose to produce and direct, respectively, District 9 featuring props and items originally made for the Halo film. Blomkamp had previously directed commercials and short films, but District 9 was his first feature film. The director co-wrote the script with his wife, Terri Tatchell, and chose to film in South Africa, where he was born.

In District 9, Tatchell and Blomkamp returned to the world explored in his short film, Alive in Joburg, choosing characters, moments and concepts that they found interesting including the documentary-style filmmaking, staged interviews, alien designs, alien technology/mecha suits, and the parallels to racial conflict and segregation in South Africa, and fleshing out these elements for the feature film.

QED International financed the negative cost. After the 2007 American Film Market, QED partnered with Sony's TriStar Pictures for distribution in English-language territories, Korea, Italy, Russia and Portugal.

=== Filming ===
The film was shot on location in Chiawelo, Soweto, during a time of violent unrest in Alexandra (Gauteng) and other South African townships involving clashes between local South Africans and people born in other African countries as part of the May 2008 South Africa riots. The location that portrays District 9 is itself a real impoverished neighbourhood from which people were being forcibly relocated to government-subsidised housing. Several scenes were shot at the Ponte building.

Filming for District 9 took place during the winter in Johannesburg. According to director Neill Blomkamp, during the winter season, Johannesburg "actually looks like Chernobyl", a "nuclear apocalyptic wasteland". Blomkamp wanted to capture the deserted, bleak atmosphere and environment, so he and the crew had to film during the months of June through July. The film took a total of 60 days of shooting. Filming in December raised another issue in that there was much more rain. Due to the rain, there was a lot of greenery to work with, which Blomkamp did not want. Blomkamp had to cut some of the vegetation in the scenery to portray the setting as desolate and dark.

The film features many weapons and vehicles produced by the South African arms industry, including the R5 and Vektor CR-21 assault rifles, Denel NTW-20 20 mm anti-materiel rifle, Milkor BXP submachine gun, Casspir armoured personnel carrier, Ratel infantry fighting vehicle, Rooikat armoured fighting vehicle, Atlas Oryx helicopter and militarized Toyota Hilux "technical" pickup truck.

Blomkamp said no single film influenced District 9, but cited the 1980s "hardcore sci-fi/action" films such as Alien, Aliens, The Terminator, Terminator 2: Judgment Day, Predator, and RoboCop as subconscious influences. The director said, "I don't know whether the film has that feeling or not for the audience, but I wanted it to have that harsh 1980s kind of vibe—I didn't want it to feel glossy and slick."

Because of the amount of hand-held shooting required for the film, the producers and crew decided to shoot using the digital Red One 4K camera. Cinematographer Trent Opaloch used nine digital Red Ones owned by Peter Jackson for primary filming. According to HD Magazine, District 9 was shot on RED One cameras using build 15, Cooke S4 primes and Angenieux zooms. The documentary-style and CCTV-style cam footage was shot on the Sony EX1/EX3 XDCAM-HD. Additionally, the post-production team was warned that the most RED Camera footage they could handle a day was about an hour and a half. When that got to five hours a day, additional resources were brought in, and 120 terabytes of data was filled.

=== Visual effects ===
The aliens in District 9 were designed by Weta Workshop, and the design was executed by Image Engine.

Blomkamp wanted the aliens to maintain both humane and barbaric features in the design of the creatures. According to Terri Tatchell, the director's writing partner, "They are not appealing, they are not cute, and they don't tug at our heartstrings. He went for a scary, hard, warrior-looking alien, which is much more of a challenge." The look of the alien, with its exoskeleton-crustacean hybrid and crab-like shells, was meant to initially evoke a sense of disgust from viewers but as the story progresses, the audience was meant to sympathize with these creatures who had such human-like emotions and characteristics. Blomkamp established criteria for the design of the aliens. He wanted the species to be insect-like but also bipedal. The director wanted the audience to relate to the aliens and said of the restriction on the creature design, "Unfortunately, they had to be human-esque because our psychology doesn't allow us to really empathize with something unless it has a face and an anthropomorphic shape. Like if you see something that's four-legged, you think it's a dog; that's just how we're wired ... If you make a film about an alien force, which is the oppressor or aggressor, and you don't want to empathize with them, you can go to town. So creatively that's what I wanted to do but story-wise, I just couldn't."

Blomkamp originally sought to have Weta Digital design the creatures, but the company was busy with effects for Avatar. The director then decided to choose a Vancouver-based effects company because he anticipated making films there in the future and because British Columbia offered a tax credit. Blomkamp met with Image Engine and considered them "a bit of a gamble" since the company had not pursued a project as large as a feature film. Aside from the aliens appearing on the operating table in the medical lab, all of them were created using CGI visual effects.

Weta Digital designed the 2 1/2-kilometer (1½ mile) diameter mothership and the drop ship, while the exo-suit and the little pets were designed by The Embassy Visual Effects. Zoic Studios performed overflow 2D work. On-set live special effects were created by MXFX. Some of the software used for the visual effects were Autodesk Softimage.

=== Soundtrack ===
The soundtrack for District 9 was composed by Clinton Shorter, who spent three weeks preparing for the film. Director Neill Blomkamp wanted a "raw and dark" score, but one that maintained its South African roots. This was a challenge for Shorter, who found much of the South African music he worked with to be optimistic and joyful. Unable to get the djembe and ngoma drums to sound dark and heavy, Shorter used a combination of taiko drums and synthesized instruments for the desired effects, with the core South African elements of the score conveyed in the vocals and smaller percussion. Both the score and soundtrack feature music and vocals from Kwaito artists.

== Release ==
District 9 held its world premiere on 23 July 2009 at the Reading Gaslamp 15 at San Diego Comic-Con, with Copley, Blomkamp and Jackson in attendance. It was released by TriStar Pictures on 14 August 2009.

=== Marketing ===
Sony Pictures launched a "Humans Only" marketing campaign to promote District 9. Sony's marketing team designed its promotional material to emulate the segregational billboards that appear throughout the film. Billboards, banners, posters, and stickers were thus designed with the theme in mind, and the material was spread across public places such as bus stops in various cities, including "humans only" signs in certain locations and providing toll-free numbers to report "non-human" activity. This marketing strategy was designed to provoke reactions in its target audience (namely, sci-fi fans and people concerned with discrimination), hence the use of obviously fake segregational propaganda. According to Dwight Caines, Sony's president of digital marketing, an estimated 33,000 phone calls were made to the toll-free numbers during a two-week period with 2,500 of them leaving voicemails with reports of alien sightings. Promotional material was also presented at the 2008 San Diego Comic-Con, advertising the website D-9.com, which had an application presented by the fictional Multi-National United (MNU). The website had a local alert system for Johannesburg (the film's setting), news feeds, behavior recommendations, and rules and regulations. Other viral websites for the film were also launched, including an MNU website with a countdown timer for the film's release, an anti-MNU blog run by fictional alien character Christopher Johnson, and an MNU-sponsored educational website. An online game for District 9 has also been made where players can choose to be a human or an alien. Humans are MNU agents on patrol trying to arrest or kill aliens. Aliens try to avoid capture from MNU agents whilst searching for alien canisters. This digital approach to marketing follows a rising trend among digital natives who develop marketing trends and techniques which are appropriate to the digital age, and is cost-efficient due to its reliance on social media and communications. This breaking down and circumvention of existing marketing structures follows postmodernist theory in cinema.

In July of 2010 collectible and effects company Wētā Workshop (which also did extensive work on the actual film) released a limited edition sculpture of Christopher Johnson and his son.

According to the American Humane Association, the film displays an unauthorized "no animals were harmed" end credit, which is a registered trademark of the group.

=== Home media ===
The Blu-ray Disc and region 1 code widescreen edition of District 9 as well as the 2-disc special-edition version on DVD was released on 22 December 2009 by Sony Pictures Home Entertainment. The DVD and Blu-ray Disc includes the documentary "The Alien Agenda: A Filmmaker's Log" and the special features "Metamorphosis: The Transformation of Wikus", "Innovation: Acting and Improvisation", "Conception and Design: Creating the World of District 9", and "Alien Generation: Visual Effects".

The demo for the video game God of War III featured in the 2009 Electronic Entertainment Expo is also included with the Blu-ray release of District 9 playable on the Sony PlayStation 3.

District 9 was released on Ultra HD Blu-ray on 13 October 2020.

== Reception ==
=== Box office ===
District 9 grossed US$115.6 million from the United States and Canada, with a worldwide total of $210,819,611, against a production budget of US$30 million.

It opened in 3,048 theatres in Canada and the United States on 14 August 2009, and the film ranked first at the weekend box office with an opening gross of US$37.4 million. Among comparable science fiction films in the past, its opening attendance was slightly less than the 2008 film Cloverfield and the 1997 film Starship Troopers. The audience demographic for District 9 was 64 percent male and 57 percent people 25 years or older. The film stood out as a summer film that generated strong business despite little-known casting. Its opening success was attributed to the studio's unusual marketing campaign. In the film's second weekend, it dropped 49% in revenue while competing against the opening film Inglourious Basterds for the male audience, as Sony Pictures attributed the "good hold" to District 9's strong playability.

The film enjoyed similar success in the UK with an opening gross of £2,288,378 showing at 447 cinemas.

=== Critical response ===
Rotten Tomatoes gives District 9 an approval rating of 90% based on 314 reviews, with an average rating of 8.0/10. The website's consensus states, "Technically brilliant and emotionally wrenching, District 9 has action, imagination, and all the elements of a thoroughly entertaining science-fiction classic." On Metacritic, which assigns a weighted average rating out of 100 to reviews from mainstream critics, the film has a score of 81 based on 36 reviews, indicating "universal acclaim". Audiences polled by CinemaScore gave the film an average grade of "B" on an A+ to F scale.

Sara Vilkomerson of The New York Observer wrote, "District 9 is the most exciting science fiction movie to come along in ages; definitely the most thrilling film of the summer; and quite possibly the best film I've seen all year." Christy Lemire from the Associated Press was impressed by the plot and thematic content, claiming that "District 9 has the aesthetic trappings of science fiction but it's really more of a character drama, an examination of how a man responds when he's forced to confront his identity during extraordinary circumstances." Entertainment Weekly's Lisa Schwarzbaum described it as "... madly original, cheekily political, [and] altogether exciting..."

Roger Ebert of the Chicago Sun-Times gave the film three stars out of four and praised it for "giving us aliens to remind us not everyone who comes in a spaceship needs to be angelic, octopod or stainless steel", but complained that "the third act is disappointing, involving standard shoot-out action. No attempt is made to resolve the situation, and if that's a happy ending, I've seen happier. Despite its creativity, the film remains space opera and avoids the higher realms of science-fiction." Josh Tyler of Cinema Blend felt the film was unique in interpretation and execution, but considered it to be "a knockoff" of the 1988 film Alien Nation.

IGN listed District 9 at No. 24 on a list of the Top 25 Sci-Fi Films of All Time.

In 2025, it was one of the films voted for the "Readers' Choice" edition of The New York Times' list of "The 100 Best Movies of the 21st Century," finishing at number 320.

=== Criticism about representation of Nigerians ===
Nigeria's Information Minister Dora Akunyili asked movie cinemas around the country to either ban the film or edit out specific references to the country because of the film's negative depiction of the Nigerian characters as criminals and cannibals. Letters of complaint were sent to the producer and distributor of the film demanding an apology. She also said the gang leader Obasanjo is almost identical in spelling and pronunciation to the surname of former president Olusegun Obasanjo. The film was later banned in Nigeria; the Nigerian Film and Video Censors Board was asked to prevent cinemas from showing the film and also to confiscate it.

Hakeem Kae-Kazim, a Nigerian-born British actor, also criticised the portrayal of Nigerians in the film and was concerned it would reinforce negative stereotypes.

However, the Malawian actor Eugene Khumbanyiwa, who played Obasanjo, has stated that the Nigerians in the cast of District 9 were not perturbed by the portrayal of Nigerians in the film, and that the film should not be taken literally: "It's a story, you know. It's not like Nigerians do eat aliens. Aliens don't even exist in the first place."

Teju Cole, a Nigerian-American writer, has commented that the "one-dimensionality of the Nigerian characters is striking," even when taking into account that District 9 is meant to be a fable. He suggests two possible explanations for Blomkamp's narrative choice: first, that it is meant to reflect anti-foreigner sentiment within South Africa, or second, that it simply represents an oversight on Blomkamp's part.

In 2013, the film was one of several discussed by David Sirota in Salon.com in an article concerning white savior narratives in film.

It has been argued that Wikus's grotesque transformation is indicative of the fact that "While biological discourses of racial subhumanity might have been expunged from public knowledges in the postapartheid nation, contemporary South Africa continues to be structured according to the binary that undergirds such narratives."

=== Accolades ===
District 9 was named one of the top 10 independent films of 2009 by the National Board of Review of Motion Pictures. The film also won The Ray Bradbury Nebula Award for Outstanding Dramatic Presentation. The film received four Academy Awards nominations for: Best Motion Picture of the Year (Peter Jackson and Carolynne Cunningham), Best Writing, Adapted Screenplay (Neill Blomkamp and Terri Tatchell), Best Achievement in Film Editing (Julian Clarke) and Best Achievement in Visual Effects (Dan Kaufman, Peter Muyzers, Robert Habros and Matt Aitken); seven British Academy Film Awards nominations: Best Cinematography (Trent Opaloch), Best Screenplay – Adapted (Neill Blomkamp and Terri Tatchell), Best Editing (Julian Clarke), Best Production Design (Philip Ivey, Guy Potgieter), Best Sound (Brent Burge, Chris Ward, Dave Whitehead, Michael Hedges and Ken Saville), Best Special Visual Effects (Dan Kaufman, Peter Muyzers, Robert Habros and Matt Aitken) and Best Director (Neill Blomkamp); five Broadcast Film Critics Association nominations: Best Makeup (Won), Best Screenplay, Adapted (Neill Blomkamp and Terri Tatchell), Best Sound, Best Visual Effects and Best Action Movie; and one Golden Globe nomination: Best Screenplay – Motion Picture (Neill Blomkamp and Terri Tatchell).

It is the fifth TriStar Pictures film ever nominated for Best Picture at the Academy Awards (the previous four were As Good as It Gets, Jerry Maguire, Bugsy and Places in the Heart). It won the 2009 Bradbury Award from the Science Fiction and Fantasy Writers of America.

== Future ==
On 1 August 2009, two weeks before District 9 was released to cinemas, Neill Blomkamp hinted that he intended to make a sequel if the film was successful enough. During an interview on the Rude Awakening 94.7 Highveld Stereo breakfast radio show, he alluded to it, saying "There probably will be." Nevertheless, he revealed that his next project is unrelated to the District 9 universe. In an interview with Rotten Tomatoes, Blomkamp stated that he was "totally" hoping for a follow-up: "I haven't thought of a story yet but if people want to see another one, I'd love to do it." Blomkamp has posed the possibility of the next movie in the series being a prequel. In an interview with Empire magazine posted on 28 April 2010, Sharlto Copley suggested that a follow-up, while very likely, would be about two years away, given his and Neill Blomkamp's current commitments.

In an interview with IGN in June 2013, Blomkamp said, "I really want to make a District 9 sequel. I genuinely do. The problem is I have a bunch of ideas and stuff that I want to make. I'm relatively new to this—I'm about to make my third film, and now the pattern that I'm starting to realise is very true is that you lock yourself into a film beyond the film you're currently working on. But it just doesn't work for me." Referring to a potential sequel, Blomkamp said "[he] want[s] to make District 10 at some point."

On 26 February 2021, Neill Blomkamp revealed on his official Twitter that development was moving ahead on a script for a sequel, titled District 10, with Sharlto Copley and Terri Tatchell co-writing the screenplay with him.

On 19 August 2022, Sharlto Copley said in an interview that District 10 was still in discussions; that both he and Blomkamp had written drafts for it, and that the film would probably have a chance once Blomkamp was done shooting Gran Turismo.

In August 2023, Blomkamp was asked about a District 9 sequel while promoting Gran Turismo and hinted at the project being shelved indefinitely. "I don't know if it's getting made or not," Blomkamp told Brian Davids of The Hollywood Reporter. "I don't know if I even want to make that right now, but at some point down the line, it'll probably get made."

== See also ==
- Insectoids in science fiction and fantasy
- List of films featuring powered exoskeletons
- Alien Nation (film)
- Project Coast
- The Aversion Project
- Second Boer War concentration camps
- Casspir
- Parktown prawn
