= List of accolades received by An Education =

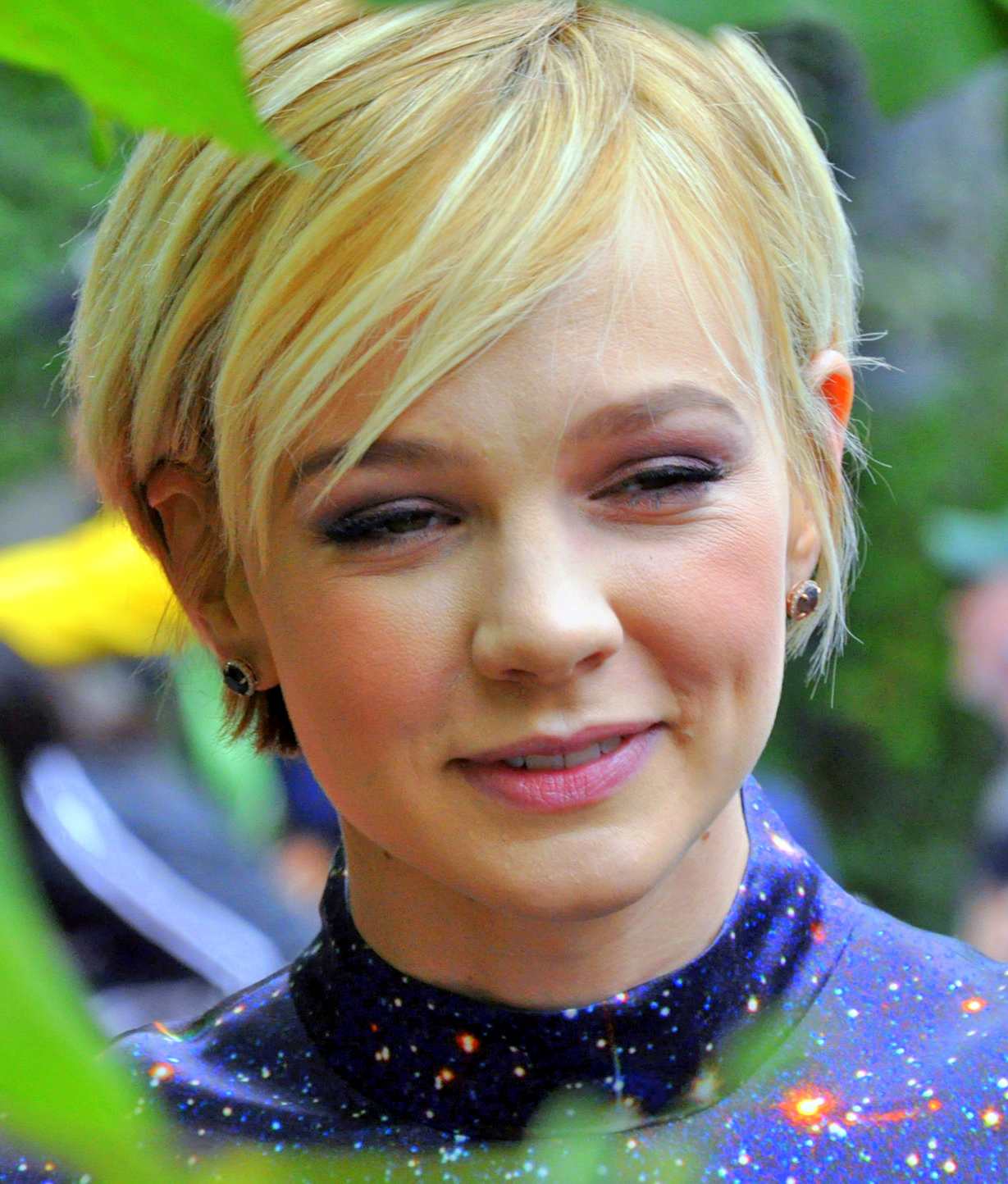
- Carey Mulligan received numerous awards and nominations for her performance in An Education
Awards and nominations
| Award | Won | Nominated |
| Academy Award | 0 | 3 |
| Alliance of Women Film Journalists | 3 | 3 |
| British Academy Film Awards | 1 | 9 |
| British Independent Film Awards | 1 | 6 |
| British Society of Cinematographers | 0 | 1 |
| Broadcast Film Critics | 0 | 4 |
| Chicago Film Critics Association | 2 | 3 |
| Dallas-Fort Worth Film Critics Association | 1 | 2 |
| Detroit Film Critics Society | 0 | 2 |
| Empire Awards | 0 | 3 |
| Evening Standard British Film Awards | 0 | 2 |
| Film Critics Circle of Australia | 0 | 1 |
| Golden Globe Awards | 0 | 1 |
| Hollywood Film Festival | 1 | 1 |
| Houston Film Critics Society | 1 | 1 |
| Independent Spirit Awards | 1 | 1 |
| London Film Critics' Circle | 1 | 7 |
| Los Angeles Film Critics Association | 0 | 1 |
| Mill Valley Film Festival | 1 | 1 |
| Motion Picture Sound Editors | 0 | 2 |
| National Board of Review | 1 | 1 |
| Online Film Critics Society | 0 | 1 |
| Producers Guild of America Awards | 0 | 1 |
| Richard Attenborough Film Awards | 2 | 2 |
| San Diego Film Critics Society | 0 | 1 |
| Santa Barbara International Film Festival | 2 | 2 |
| Satellite Awards | 0 | 5 |
| Screen Actors Guild | 0 | 2 |
| St. Louis Gateway Film Critics Association | 1 | 1 |
| Sundance Film Festival | 2 | 3 |
| Toronto Film Critics Association | 1 | 1 |
| USC Scripter Award | 0 | 1 |
| Vancouver Film Critics Circle | 0 | 2 |
| Washington DC Area Film Critics Association | 1 | 4 |
| Women Film Critics Circle | 2 | 2 |
| Women in Film and TV Awards | 1 | 1 |
- Total number of wins and nominations
| Totals | 26 | 84 |
- References

An Education is a 2009 coming-of-age drama film directed by Lone Scherfig and written by Nick Hornby. It is based on the memoirs of the same name by British journalist Lynn Barber. The film premiered on 18 January 2009 at the Sundance Film Festival and screened at the Toronto International Film Festival on 10 September 2009. The film then showed at the Mill Valley Film Festival before being released in the United Kingdom by Sony Pictures Classics on 30 October 2009, and going into wide release in the United States on 5 February 2010. An Education earned over $26 million in its combined total gross at the box office.

The film garnered various awards and nominations, ranging from recognition of the film itself to Hornby's screenplay and the cast's acting performances, particularly those of Carey Mulligan and Alfred Molina. The film received three Academy Award nominations, but failed to win any. At the 63rd British Academy Film Awards An Education came away with one award from nine nominations. Mulligan was named Best Actress at the British Independent Film Awards, where the film was nominated for a further six awards. An Education received one nomination, Best Actress in a Drama Motion Picture, from the 67th Golden Globe Awards.

Mulligan earned two awards for her performance at the Hollywood Film Festival and Houston Film Critics Society—Breakthrough Actress and Best Actress respectively. An Education won Best Film from both the Sundance Film and Mill Valley Film Festivals, it would later go on to win Best Foreign Film at the Independent Spirit Awards. Four members of the cast were nominated for awards at the London Film Critics' Circle, along with the film and screenplay. Hornby subsequently received eleven more nominations for his work on the screenplay. Mulligan and Peter Sarsgaard both received awards from the Santa Barbara International Film Festival and the Alliance of Women Film Journalists, where they were the recipients of the Best Depiction Of Nudity, Sexuality, or Seduction award. The 16th Screen Actors Guild Awards saw the film's cast earn a nomination for Outstanding Performance by a Cast in a Motion Picture. The film's music, costume, and hair and make-up also earned four nominations among them.

== Awards and nominations ==
| Award | Date of ceremony | Category | Recipients | Result |
|---|---|---|---|---|
| Academy Award | 7 March 2010 | Best Picture | Finola Dwyer and Amanda Posey | Nominated |
| Academy Award | 7 March 2010 | Best Actress | Carey Mulligan | Nominated |
| Academy Award | 7 March 2010 | Best Adapted Screenplay | Nick Hornby | Nominated |
| Alliance of Women Film Journalists | 15 December 2009 | Best Actress | Carey Mulligan | Won |
| Alliance of Women Film Journalists | 15 December 2009 | Best Breakthrough Performance | Carey Mulligan | Won |
| Alliance of Women Film Journalists | 15 December 2009 | Best Depiction Of Nudity, Sexuality, or Seduction | Carey Mulligan and Peter Sarsgaard | Won |
| British Academy Film Awards | 21 February 2010 | Best Film | An Education | Nominated |
| British Academy Film Awards | 21 February 2010 | Outstanding British Film | An Education | Nominated |
| British Academy Film Awards | 21 February 2010 | Best Director | Lone Scherfig | Nominated |
| British Academy Film Awards | 21 February 2010 | Best Adapted Screenplay | Nick Hornby | Nominated |
| British Academy Film Awards | 21 February 2010 | Best Actress | Carey Mulligan | Won |
| British Academy Film Awards | 21 February 2010 | Best Supporting Actor | Alfred Molina | Nominated |
| British Academy Film Awards | 21 February 2010 | Best Costume Design | Odile Dicks-Mireaux | Nominated |
| British Academy Film Awards | 21 February 2010 | Best Make-Up and Hair | Lizzie Yianni Georgiou | Nominated |
| British Academy Film Awards | 21 February 2010 | Orange Rising Star Award | Carey Mulligan | Nominated |
| British Independent Film Awards | 6 December 2010 | Best British Independent Film | An Education | Nominated |
| British Independent Film Awards | 6 December 2010 | Best Director | Lone Scherfig | Nominated |
| British Independent Film Awards | 6 December 2010 | Best Screenplay | Nick Hornby | Nominated |
| British Independent Film Awards | 6 December 2010 | Best Actress | Carey Mulligan | Won |
| British Independent Film Awards | 6 December 2010 | Best Supporting Actor | Alfred Molina | Nominated |
| British Independent Film Awards | 6 December 2010 | Best Supporting Actress | Rosamund Pike | Nominated |
| British Society of Cinematographers | 18 July 2010 | Best Cinematography | John de Borman | Nominated |
| Broadcast Film Critics Association | 15 January 2010 | Best Picture | An Education | Nominated |
| Broadcast Film Critics Association | 15 January 2010 | Best Adapted Screenplay | Nick Hornby | Nominated |
| Broadcast Film Critics Association | 15 January 2010 | Best Actress | Carey Mulligan | Nominated |
| Broadcast Film Critics Association | 15 January 2010 | Best Supporting Actor | Alfred Molina | Nominated |
| Chicago Film Critics Association | 21 December 2009 | Best Adapted Screenplay | Nick Hornby | Nominated |
| Chicago Film Critics Association | 21 December 2009 | Best Actress | Carey Mulligan | Won |
| Chicago Film Critics Association | 21 December 2009 | Most Promising Performer | Carey Mulligan | Won |
| Dallas-Fort Worth Film Critics Association | 16 December 2009 | Best Actress | Carey Mulligan | Won |
| Dallas-Fort Worth Film Critics Association | 16 December 2009 | Best Supporting Actor | Alfred Molina | Nominated |
| Detroit Film Critics Society | 11 December 2009 | Best Actress | Carey Mulligan | Nominated |
| Detroit Film Critics Society | 11 December 2009 | Breakthrough Performance | Carey Mulligan | Nominated |
| Empire Awards | 28 March 2010 | Best British Film | An Education | Nominated |
| Empire Awards | 28 March 2010 | Best Actress | Carey Mulligan | Nominated |
| Empire Awards | 28 March 2010 | Best Newcomer | Carey Mulligan | Nominated |
| Evening Standard British Film Awards | 8 February 2010 | Best Screenplay | Nick Hornby | Nominated |
| Evening Standard British Film Awards | 8 February 2010 | Best Actress | Carey Mulligan | Nominated |
| Film Critics Circle of Australia | 31 May 2010 | Best Foreign Film in the English Language | An Education | Nominated |
| Golden Globe Awards | 17 January 2010 | Best Actress in a Drama Motion Picture | Carey Mulligan | Nominated |
| Hollywood Film Festival | 26 October 2009 | Breakthrough Actress | Carey Mulligan | Won |
| Houston Film Critics Society | 19 December 2010 | Best Actress | Carey Mulligan | Won |
| Independent Spirit Awards | 5 March 2010 | Best Foreign Film | An Education | Won |
| London Film Critics' Circle | 18 February 2010 | British Film of the Year | An Education | Nominated |
| London Film Critics' Circle | 18 February 2010 | Screenwriter of the Year | Nick Hornby | Nominated |
| London Film Critics' Circle | 18 February 2010 | Actress of the Year | Carey Mulligan | Nominated |
| London Film Critics' Circle | 18 February 2010 | British Actress of the Year | Carey Mulligan | Won |
| London Film Critics' Circle | 18 February 2010 | British Supporting Actor of the Year | Alfred Molina | Nominated |
| London Film Critics' Circle | 18 February 2010 | British Supporting Actress of the Year | Rosamund Pike | Nominated |
| London Film Critics' Circle | 18 February 2010 | British Supporting Actress of the Year | Olivia Williams | Nominated |
| Los Angeles Film Critics | 14 December 2009 | Best Actress | Carey Mulligan | Nominated |
| Mill Valley Film Festival | 8 October 2009 | Favourite World Feature | An Education | Won |
| Motion Picture Sound Editors | 20 February 2010 | Best Sound Effects, Foley, Dialogue and ADR in a Foreign Feature Film | An Education | Nominated |
| Motion Picture Sound Editors | 20 February 2010 | Best Music in a Feature Film | An Education | Nominated |
| National Board of Review | 12 January 2010 | Best Actress | Carey Mulligan | Won |
| Online Film Critics Society | 6 January 2010 | Best Actress | Carey Mulligan | Nominated |
| Producers Guild of America Award | 24 January 2010 | Theatrical Motion Picture Producer of the Year | Finola Dwyer and Amanda Posey | Nominated |
| Richard Attenborough Film Awards | 28 January 2010 | Best Actress | Carey Mulligan | Won |
| Richard Attenborough Film Awards | 28 January 2010 | Rising Star | Carey Mulligan | Won |
| San Diego Film Critics Society | 15 December 2009 | Best Actress | Carey Mulligan | Nominated |
| Santa Barbara International Film Festival | 4 February 2010 | Virtuoso Award | Carey Mulligan | Won |
| Santa Barbara International Film Festival | 4 February 2010 | Cinema Vanguard Award | Peter Sarsgaard | Won |
| Satellite Awards | 20 December 2009 | Best Drama Film | An Education | Nominated |
| Satellite Awards | 20 December 2009 | Best Director | Lone Scherfig | Nominated |
| Satellite Awards | 20 December 2009 | Best Adapted Screenplay | Nick Hornby | Nominated |
| Satellite Awards | 20 December 2009 | Best Drama Actress | Carey Mulligan | Nominated |
| Satellite Awards | 20 December 2009 | Best Supporting Actor | Alfred Molina | Nominated |
| Screen Actors Guild | 23 January 2010 | Outstanding Performance by a Female Actor in a Leading Role | Carey Mulligan | Nominated |
| Screen Actors Guild | 23 January 2010 | Outstanding Performance by a Cast in a Motion Picture | An Education | Nominated |
| St. Louis Gateway Film Critics Association | 21 December 2009 | Best Actress | Carey Mulligan | Won |
| Sundance Film Festival | 15 January 2009 | Grand Jury Prize | An Education | Nominated |
| Sundance Film Festival | 15 January 2009 | World Cinema Audience Award: Dramatic | An Education | Won |
| Sundance Film Festival | 15 January 2009 | World Cinema Cinematography Award: Dramatic | John De Borman | Won |
| Toronto Film Critics Association | 16 December 2009 | Best Actress | Carey Mulligan | Won |
| USC Scripter Award | 6 February 2010 | Best Screenplay | Nick Hornby and Lynn Barber | Nominated |
| Vancouver Film Critics Circle | 13 January 2010 | Best Actress | Carey Mulligan | Won |
| Vancouver Film Critics Circle | 13 January 2010 | Best Supporting Actor | Alfred Molina | Nominated |
| Washington D.C. Area Film Critics Association | 7 December 2009 | Best Adapted Screenplay | Nick Hornby | Nominated |
| Washington D.C. Area Film Critics Association | 7 December 2009 | Best Actress | Carey Mulligan | Won |
| Washington D.C. Area Film Critics Association | 7 December 2009 | Best Supporting Actor | Alfred Molina | Nominated |
| Washington D.C. Area Film Critics Association | 7 December 2009 | Best Breakthrough Performance | Carey Mulligan | Nominated |
| Women Film Critics Circle | 9 December 2009 | Karen Morley Award | An Education | Won |
| Women Film Critics Circle | 9 December 2009 | The Invisible Woman Award | Olivia Williams | Won |
| Women in Film and TV Awards | 3 December 2010 | Best Performance | Carey Mulligan | Won |
