= 22nd European Film Awards =

2009 film awards ceremony in Germany

The 22nd European Film Awards
- Date: 12 December 2009
- Location: Bochum, Germany
- Presented by: European Film Academy

The 22nd European Film Awards were presented on 12 December 2009, in Bochum, Germany. The formerly industrial city was chosen as a location to mark the wider Ruhr area's selection as European Capital of Culture for 2010.

== Winners and nominees ==
Although A Prophet received the most nominations, Michael Haneke's The White Ribbon was the most celebrated film of the awards, with Haneke winning for direction and screenwriting as well as taking the Best Film prize. In addition to the regular awards listed below, British director Ken Loach was given a lifetime achievement award and French actress Isabelle Huppert received a special honour for European Achievement in World Cinema.

=== Best Actor ===
Tahar Rahim – A Prophet (Un prophète)

- Moritz Bleibtreu – The Baader Meinhof Complex (Der Baader Meinhof Komplex)
- Steve Evets – Looking for Eric
- David Kross – The Reader
- Dev Patel – Slumdog Millionaire
- Filippo Timi – Vincere

=== Best Actress ===
Kate Winslet – The Reader

- Penélope Cruz – Broken Embraces (Los abrazos rotos)
- Charlotte Gainsbourg – Antichrist
- Katie Jarvis – Fish Tank
- Yolande Moreau – Séraphine
- Noomi Rapace – The Girl with the Dragon Tattoo (Män som hatar kvinnor)

=== Best Animated Film ===
Mia and the Migou (Mia et le Migou) – Jacques-Rémy Girerd

- Niko & the Way to the Stars (Niko - Lentäjän poika) – Michael Hegner and Kari Juusonen
- The Secret of Kells – Tomm Moore

=== Best Cinematographer ===
Anthony Dod Mantle – Antichrist and Slumdog Millionaire

- Christian Berger – The White Ribbon (Das weiße Band)
- Maxim Drozdov and Alisher Khamidkhodzhaev – Paper Soldier (Bumazhny soldat)
- Stéphane Fontaine – A Prophet (Un prophète)

=== Best Composer ===
Alberto Iglesias – Broken Embraces (Los abrazos rotos)

- Alexandre Desplat – Coco Before Chanel (Coco avant Chanel)
- Jakob Groth – The Girl with the Dragon Tattoo (Män som hatar kvinnor)
- Johan Söderqvist – Let the Right One In (Låt den rätte komma in)

=== Best Director ===
Michael Haneke – The White Ribbon (Das weiße Band)

- Pedro Almodóvar – Broken Embraces (Los abrazos rotos)
- Andrea Arnold – Fish Tank
- Jacques Audiard – A Prophet (Un prophète)
- Danny Boyle – Slumdog Millionaire
- Lars von Trier – Antichrist

=== Best Film ===
| English title | Original title | Director(s) | Country |
|---|---|---|---|
| The White Ribbon | Das weiße Band | Michael Haneke | Germany, Austria, France, Italy |
| Fish Tank | | Andrea Arnold | United Kingdom |
| Let the Right One In | Låt den rätte komma in | Tomas Alfredson | Sweden |
| A Prophet | Un prophète | Jacques Audiard | France |
| The Reader | | Stephen Daldry | United Kingdom, Germany |
| Slumdog Millionaire | | Danny Boyle | United Kingdom |

=== Best Screenwriter ===
Michael Haneke – The White Ribbon (Das weiße Band)

- Jacques Audiard and Thomas Bidegain – A Prophet (Un prophète)
- Simon Beaufoy – Slumdog Millionaire
- Gianni di Gregorio – Mid-August Lunch (Pranzo di ferragosto)
