= Moon (soundtrack) =

Moon (Soundtrack from the Motion Picture)

Film score by Clint Mansell
- Released: 13 July 2009
- Recorded: 2008–2009
- Studio: Remote Control Productions, Santa Monica, California
- Genre: Film score
- Length: 61:23
- Label: Black Records
- Producer: Clint Mansell; Geoff Foster

Clint Mansell chronology
| The Rebound (2009) | Moon (2009) | Blood: The Last Vampire (2009) |

Moon (Soundtrack from the Motion Picture) is the film score to the 2009 film Moon directed by Duncan Jones. The film score is composed by Clint Mansell and released through Black Records UK on 13 July 2009.

== Background ==
Moon marked the maiden collaboration between Jones and Mansell. On working with Jones, he stated that "Duncan [Jones] was fantastic because he just let me go about it and he trusted me, which was great considering it was the first time we worked together." He considered the script having all elements, such as being "thoughtful, funny and emotional" making it easier for him to write the score providing "something invocative". Having used to live alone in Los Angeles, he got the idea of the characters' isolation and the theme of feeling alone was a bit easy. Mansell collaborated with the Sonus Quartet for recording the score with the guitar players and drummers from the quartet performing.

== Track listing ==
| No. | Title | Length |
|---|---|---|
| 1. | "Welcome to Lunar Industries" | 07:12 |
| 2. | "Two Weeks & Counting..." | 02:00 |
| 3. | "I'm Sam Bell" | 03:44 |
| 4. | "I'm Sam Bell, Too..." | 05:05 |
| 5. | "Memories (Someone We'll Never Know)" | 04:52 |
| 6. | "Are You Receiving?'" | 03:17 |
| 7. | "Can't Get There from Here" | 03:17 |
| 8. | ""We're Not Programs, GERTY, We're People"" | 05:10 |
| 9. | "The Nursery" | 03:45 |
| 10. | "Sacrifice" | 03:03 |
| 11. | "We're Going Home" | 03:41 |
| 12. | "Welcome to Lunar Industries (Three Year Stretch....)" | 10:04 |
| Total length: | | 55:10 |

== Reception ==
Nick Neyland of Drowned in Sound assigned a 7/10 score and wrote "There's also another appropriate reason why a two-note motif works so well here, but that would spoil a major part of a film that effortlessly stands shoulder-to-shoulder with Douglas Trumbull's isolationist classic, Silent Running." Simon Rueben of The Line of Best Fit wrote "Mansell's work just keeps on getting better and better. His soundtracks are simplistic at times, and do often rely on repetition and gentle structures, but here he captures a mood that is other-worldly, mysterious without being overtly sinister. Mansell can hold his head up high against his peers, proud of his past, and confident of his future." Martin Robinson of NME wrote "this is a truly beautiful ambient work, achingly sad and really quite eerie" and rated 4 out of 5 stars.

Thomas H. Green of The Daily Telegraph also provided a similar rating and summarized "Mansell's latest work is for Duncan Jones's sci-fi flick Moon and it weaves a simple reverb-haunted piano motif into an effective and plaintively spooked half-hour suite." Soundsphere Magazine rated 4 out of 5 to the album, saying "There's something on this for everyone, and every single emotion. Definitely give this a listen before you go and check out the movie. This stuff is totally spacey, vibrant and it's a very worthwhile addition to your Mansell or soundtrack collection." Jonathan Broxton of Movie Music UK wrote "for the most part, the score is a nightmare, a thematic wasteland that just drones on and on, offering virtually no melody, no harmony, and nothing remotely tangible with which to connect."

Simon Crook of Empire wrote "Clint Mansell's spectral piano score compound the sense of unearthly isolation". Patrick Z. McGavin of Screen International called the music as "convincingly eerie and sinister". Dennis Harvey of Variety wrote "Clint Mansell's atmospheric score is a plus." Kimberley Jones of The Austin Chronicle called it "a striking, under-the-skin original score by Clint Mansell". Brian Bitner of JoBlo.com wrote "Aronofsky regular Clint Mansell provides an incredible score which both drives the film forward with a constant pulse and adds to the mystery with ethereal strings and mesmerizing piano." Duane Byrge of The Hollywood Reporter wrote that "Clint Mansell's music heightens the psycho-scape."

== Accolades ==
| Award | Date of ceremony | Category | Recipients | Result |
|---|---|---|---|---|
| British Independent Film Awards | 6 December 2009 | Best Technical Achievement | Clint Mansell | Nominated |
