= Archive (film) =

- Film poster
- Directed by: Gavin Rothery
- Written by: Gavin Rothery
- Produced by: Cora Palfrey; Philip Herd; Theo James
- Starring: Theo James; Stacy Martin; Rhona Mitra; Peter Ferdinando; Richard Glover; Lia Williams; Toby Jones
- Cinematography: Laurie Rose
- Edited by: Adam Biskupski
- Music by: Steven Price
- Production companies: Independent Films; Head Gear Films; Untapped Films; Hero Squared
- Distributed by: Vertical Entertainment
- Release dates: 10 July 2020 (United States); 18 January 2021 (United Kingdom)
- Running time: 105 minutes
- Countries: United Kingdom; Hungary; United States
- Language: English
- Box office: $243,279

Archive is a 2020 British science fiction film written and directed by Gavin Rothery, in his directorial debut. It stars Theo James, Stacy Martin, Rhona Mitra, Peter Ferdinando, Timea Maday Kinga and Toby Jones. Set in 2038, the film follows a scientist who is trying to advance artificial intelligence a step further than human beings, all while bringing his wife back from the dead.

The film was originally set to premiere at South by Southwest in March 2020 but was cancelled due to the COVID-19 pandemic. It instead received a digital release with limited screenings in theatres around the United States on 10 July 2020.

== Plot ==
Decades in the future, Jules and George Almore have a car accident in which Jules dies. Her consciousness is stored in a device created by the company Archive, which allows George to have simulated conversations with her on the phone for up to 200 hours. At his job, George secretly begins developing a robot that will be able to hold her consciousness permanently. After learning from two initial attempts (J1 and J2), his final version (J3) is almost complete.

J2 (which has the brain of a 16-year-old) becomes jealous of George's work on J3, and increasingly begins behaving unpredictably.

Archive sends a team to George's workplace to inspect the machine with his wife's consciousness. They notice he's tampered with it and built robots, and they suspect he's stealing their intellectual property. George finishes the J3 robot.

J2, confronted with the realization that she will never be anything more or better than she already is, destroys herself by walking into a lake. Archive recovers the robot, and threatens to sue George's company. When his boss learns that George has been building robots, she fires him. He makes a final call to his wife Jules on the Archive machine, and ends the call saying "see you soon." J3 overhears this and realizes that he intends to overwrite her consciousness with that of his wife. Though initially angry and afraid, she accepts her fate. The upload is completed as security storms George's lab.

At this point, any sign of the security team suddenly evaporates, and all is calm. The Archive starts ringing with an incoming call from Jules. J3 implores him not to answer, but George picks up and speaks to Jules, also hearing a child's voice on the line which is revealed to be that of his daughter. It is then revealed that George was the one who died in the accident, while Jules survived and is now raising their daughter in the real world. The ordeal he went through was a simulation within his own Archive, which has finally expired. With his Archive expired, it has been prepared for burial at his official funeral. Jules and their daughter say their final goodbyes and leave the Archive facility.

== Cast ==
Main cast

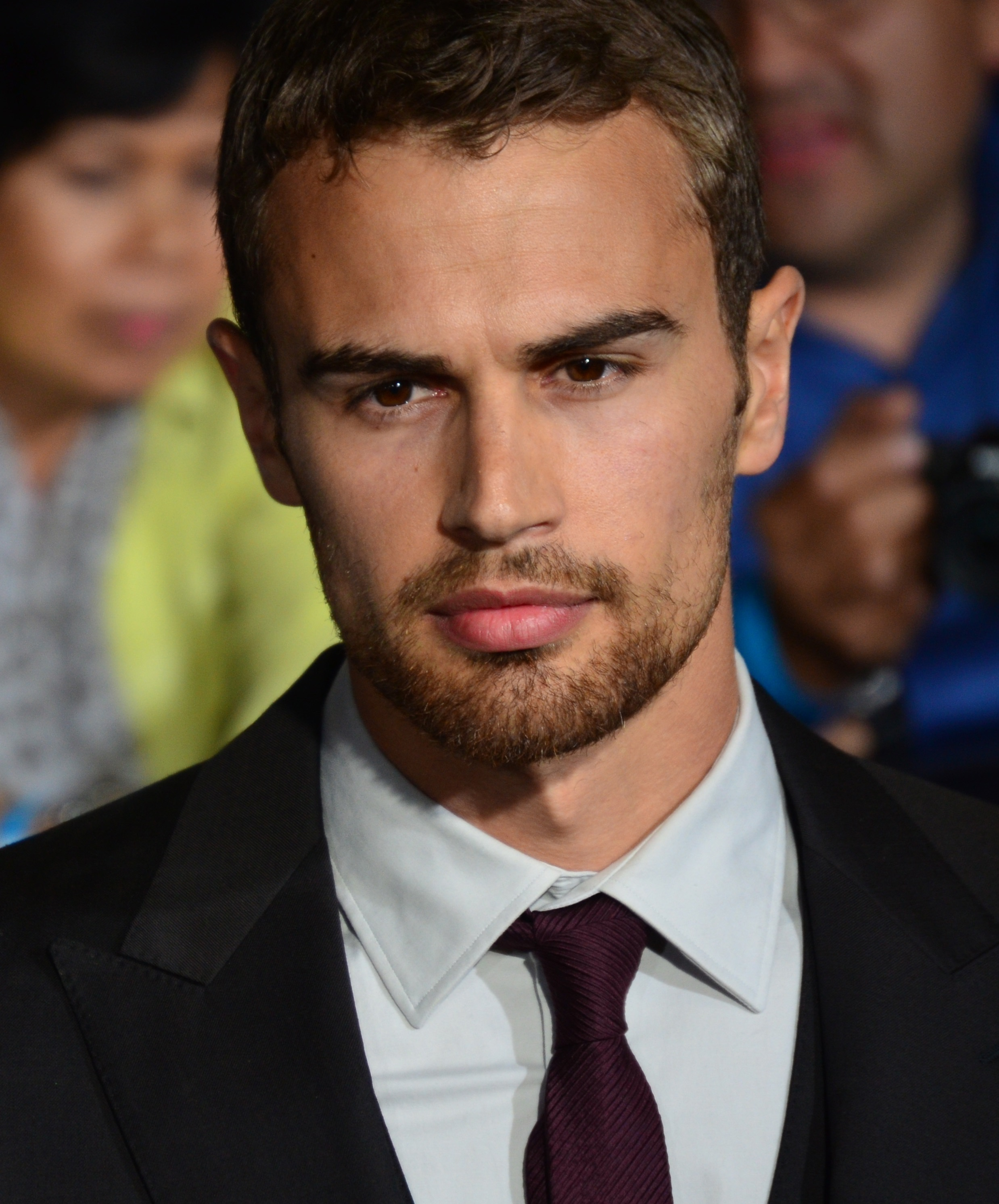
Theo James as George Almore

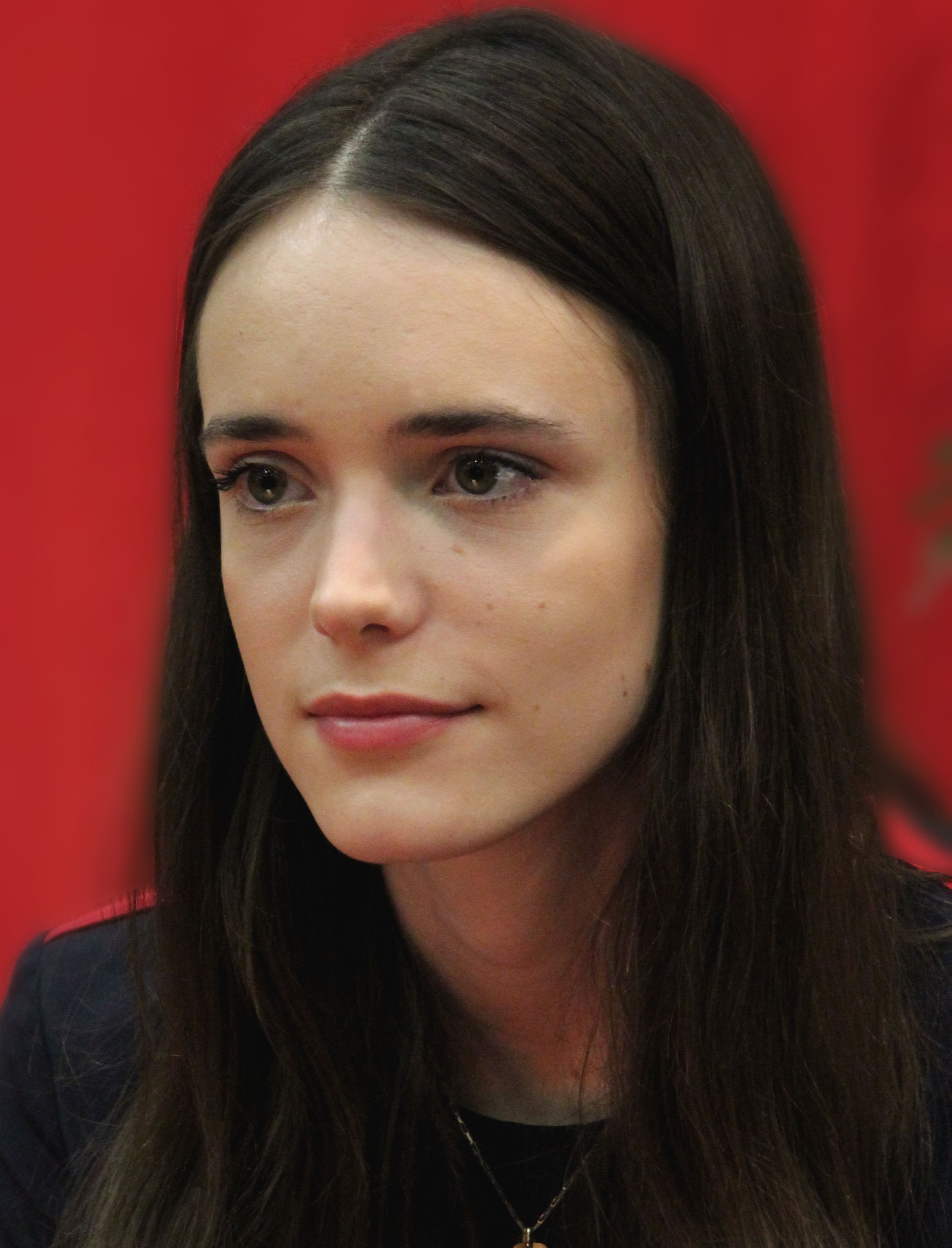
Stacy Martin as Jules Almore/J3

- Theo James as George Almore
- Stacy Martin as Jules Almore/J3, George's wife
  - Martin also provides the voice for the robot J2
- Rhona Mitra as Simone, VP of Internal Development at Artisan Robotics
- Peter Ferdinando as Mr. Tagg
- Richard Glover as Melvin, an associate of Vincent Sinclair
- Hans Peterson as Elson
- Lia Williams as the voice system of George's house
- Toby Jones as Vincent Sinclair, an executive of the Archive company

== Production ==
On 14 May 2017, it was announced that concept and graphic artist Gavin Rothery, who had worked with Duncan Jones on his first feature, Moon, would write and direct Archive with Theo James set to star. On 31 October 2018, Philip Herd and Cora Helfrey of Independent joined as producers for the project, with Stacy Martin starring opposite Theo James. James also brought on his production label, Untapped, and would be producing alongside Andrew D. Corkin. Vertical Entertainment later acquired the distribution rights for the U.S., with the international rights currently up for sale.

Principal photography began in Hungary and Norway (featuring Månafossen waterfall) in late October 2018 and ended in February 2019. Laurie Rose served as director of photography. The digital makeup and advance cleanup were done by the UK-based company Koala FX.

== Release ==
The film was released on 10 July 2020 on digital streaming platforms by Vertical Entertainment after it was pulled in March 2020 from South by Southwest, which was cancelled due to the COVID-19 pandemic. Limited screenings were also available in various theatres around the U.S.

The film was released on 13 August 2020 in Russia in 260 screens and was number 5 at the box office charts in its opening weekend.

== Critical response ==
On review aggregator website Rotten Tomatoes, Archive holds an approval rating of 78% based on 37 reviews, with an average rating of 7.2/10. The site's critical consensus reads: "Archive executes its fairly basic program efficiently, offering sci-fi fans an engaging meditation on love and human nature."

On Metacritic, the film has a weighted average of score of 67 out of 100, based on six critics, indicating "generally favorable reviews".

== Accolades ==
| Award | Date of ceremony | Category | Recipient(s) | Result | Ref. |
|---|---|---|---|---|---|
| B3 Biennial of the Moving Image | 15-24 October 2020 | BEN Award for Best Feature Film | Gavin Rothery | Won | |
