= List of 21st century films voted the best =

This is a list of 21st century films voted the best in national and international surveys of critics and the public.

Surveys focus on all films released in the 21st century. Voting systems differ, and some surveys suffer from biases such as self-selection or skewed demographics, while others may be susceptible to forms of interference such as vote stacking.

== List ==
- In BBC's, Mulholland Drive (2001) was ranked as the greatest film of the 21st century so far in a list by a voting poll of 177 film critics from around the world for British Broadcasting Corporation in August 2016.
- In NYT's, Parasite (2019) was ranked as the best movie of the 21st century so far in a list based on a vote by over 500 readers, actors and directors for The New York Times in June 2025.

== See also ==
- List of films voted the best
