= Gavin Rothery =

Gavin Rothery may refer to:

- Gavin Rothery (film creator), British screenwriter, director and designer
- Gavin Rothery (footballer) (born 1987), English footballer
