= London Film Critics Circle Awards 2009 =

British film awards ceremony

30th London Film Critics Circle Awards

18 February 2010

Film of the Year:
A Prophet

British Film of the Year:
Fish Tank

The 30th London Film Critics Circle Awards, honouring the best in film for 2009, were announced by the London Film Critics Circle on 18 February 2010.

== Winners and nominees ==
=== Film of the Year ===
A Prophet

- Avatar
- The Hurt Locker
- Up in the Air
- The White Ribbon

=== British Film of the Year ===
Fish Tank

- Bright Star
- An Education
- In the Loop
- Moon

=== Foreign Language Film of the Year ===
Let the Right One In • Sweden

- The Class • France
- Katyń • Poland
- A Prophet • France
- The White Ribbon • Austria

=== Director of the Year ===
Kathryn Bigelow - The Hurt Locker

- Jacques Audiard - A Prophet
- James Cameron - Avatar
- Michael Haneke - The White Ribbon
- Jason Reitman - Up in the Air

=== British Director of the Year ===
Andrea Arnold - Fish Tank

- Armando Iannucci - In the Loop
- Duncan Jones - Moon
- Kevin Macdonald - State of Play
- Sam Taylor Wood - Nowhere Boy

=== Screenwriter of the Year ===
Jesse Armstrong, Simon Blackwell, Armando Iannucci & Tony Roche - In the Loop

- Nick Hornby - An Education
- Jacques Audiard - A Prophet
- Joel Coen & Ethan Coen - A Serious Man
- Michael Haneke - The White Ribbon

=== Breakthrough British Filmmaker ===
Duncan Jones - Moon

- Daniel Barber - Harry Brown
- Armando Iannucci - In the Loop
- Peter Strickland - Katalin Varga
- Sam Taylor Wood - Nowhere Boy

=== Actor of the Year ===
Christoph Waltz - Inglourious Basterds

- Jeff Bridges - Crazy Heart
- George Clooney - Up in the Air
- Tahar Rahim - A Prophet
- Michael Stuhlbarg - A Serious Man

=== Actress of the Year ===
Mo'Nique - Precious

- Abbie Cornish - Bright Star
- Vera Farmiga - Up in the Air
- Carey Mulligan - An Education
- Meryl Streep - Julie & Julia

=== British Actor of the Year ===
Colin Firth - A Single Man

- Peter Capaldi - In the Loop
- Tom Hardy - Bronson
- Christian McKay - Me and Orson Welles
- Andy Serkis - Sex & Drugs & Rock & Roll

=== British Actress of the Year ===
Carey Mulligan - An Education

- Emily Blunt - The Young Victoria
- Katie Jarvis - Fish Tank
- Helen Mirren - The Last Station
- Kristin Scott Thomas - Nowhere Boy

=== British Supporting Actor of the Year ===
Michael Fassbender - Fish Tank

- John Hurt - 44 Inch Chest
- Jason Isaacs - Good
- Alfred Molina - An Education
- Timothy Spall - The Damned United

=== British Supporting Actress of the Year ===
Anne-Marie Duff - Nowhere Boy

- Emily Blunt - Sunshine Cleaning
- Rosamund Pike - An Education
- Kierston Wareing - Fish Tank
- Olivia Williams - An Education

=== Young British Performer of the Year ===
Katie Jarvis - Fish Tank

- Aaron Johnson - Nowhere Boy and Dummy
- Bill Milner - Sex & Drugs & Rock & Roll and Is Anybody There?
- George MacKay - The Boys Are Back
- Saoirse Ronan - The Lovely Bones

=== 30th Year Anniversary Award (Best of the winners since 1980) ===
1. Apocalypse Now
2. Schindler's List
3. The Lives of Others
4. Unforgiven
5. Brokeback Mountain
6. Cinema Paradiso
7. L.A. Confidential
8. Fargo
9. Distant Voices, Still Lives
10. The King of Comedy

=== Dilys Powell Award ===
- Quentin Tarantino
