= Robin Chalk =

English actor

- Born: London, England, UK
- Occupation: Actor

Robin Chalk is an English actor in film and theatre. His work includes the West End production of Dirty Dancing and the science-fiction film Moon directed by Duncan Jones. He appeared in the film Alleycats directed by Ian Bonhote and the computer games Until Dawn and Need for Speed: Payback.

== Biography ==
Chalk was born in Roehampton and brought up in Wimbledon, London. He was educated at King's College School and the University of Edinburgh, where he read Social Anthropology. While at university, he appeared as Joe Vegas in Fame: The Musical directed by Ed Bartlem, co-founder of the Underbelly, and produced and starred as Richard Loeb in Never the Sinner by John Logan.

== Career ==
After university, Chalk appeared in Prince Among Men by Eric Henry Sanders at London's Union Theatre. He starred in Young Woodley by John Van Druten at the Finborough Theatre and had a supporting role in Tea and Sympathy by Robert Woodruff Anderson. He appears as the body double of actor Sam Rockwell in the British science-fiction film Moon directed by Duncan Jones. In 2008, he landed the principal role of Neil Kellerman in the record-breaking West End production of Dirty Dancing.
