= Katie Jarvis =

English actress (born 1991)

- Born: 22 June 1991 (age 34); Dagenham, England
- Occupation: Actress
- Years active: 2008–2021
- Television: EastEnders (2018–2019)
- Children: 2

Katie Jarvis (born 22 June 1991) is an English former actress, known for her roles as Mia Williams in Fish Tank (2009) and Hayley Slater in the BBC soap opera EastEnders (2018–2019).

== Career ==
Jarvis was seen by a casting agent working for director Andrea Arnold, and was cast in her film Fish Tank (2009), following a successful audition. She played Mia, a troublesome and aggressive 15-year-old girl from an underclass family who is passionate about dance. The film was in the running for the Palme d'Or at the 62nd Cannes Film Festival, winning the Jury Prize. Jarvis won the British Independent Film Award for most promising newcomer for her role.

In February 2018 she joined the BBC soap opera EastEnders as Hayley Slater. She left the series in February 2019.

In October 2019 Jarvis declared she had "taken a step back from acting" and begun working as a security guard for B&M. Numerous tabloid newspapers wrote negatively about her working as a security guard, which was met with backlash from many celebrities who believed that the actress was "job shamed" by the press. They showed their support to Jarvis by sharing their "regular" jobs on social media.

== Personal life ==
Jarvis was born on 22 June 1991 in Dagenham, Essex. She gave birth to a daughter, Lillie Mae, on 9 May 2009. On 19 April 2011, she gave birth to her son, Alfie.

In March 2019 it was reported Jarvis was glassed while on a night out. On 31 July 2020 she was arrested in Southend-on-Sea on suspicion of assault and racially-aggravated public disorder. She was later released on bail. Jarvis was ultimately charged with racially aggravated harassment, common assault and two counts of assault by beating. She appeared at magistrates' court on 14 April 2021, entering no pleas and choosing to have a trial at Crown Court. Her representative told the court she intended to plead not guilty to the charges, and that she was the victim of the attack and was acting in self-defence. On 24 May 2021, Jarvis appeared at Crown Court and pleaded not guilty. She was bailed until her trial on 19 April 2022, where she admitted racially aggravated harassment and common assault and was sentenced to a two-year community order, with 200 hours of unpaid work and a requirement to complete 60 days of specified activities.

== Filmography ==
=== Film ===
| Year | Title | Role | Notes |
|---|---|---|---|
| 2009 | Fish Tank | Mia Williams | |
| 2015 | Ginger | Mary Jane Kelly | |
| 2017 | Devil's Play | Leah | Short film |
| 2017 | I Was 3 | Laura | Short film |
| 2018 | Two Graves | Zoe | |
| 2020 | Let's Talk About George | Jade | Short film |
| 2021 | Rise of the Footsoldier: Origins | Donna | |

=== Television ===
| Year | Title | Role | Notes |
|---|---|---|---|
| 2009 | 10 Minute Tales | Girl | Episode: "Perfect Day" |
| 2014 | Suspects | Sadie Burns | 2 episodes |
| 2018 | True Horror | Sam Bennetts | Episode: "Ghost in the Wall" |
| 2018–2019 | EastEnders | Hayley Slater | Series regular, 108 episodes |

== Awards and nominations ==
| Year | Award | Category | Nominee/work | Result | Ref. |
|---|---|---|---|---|---|
| 2009 | Edinburgh International Film Festival | PPG Award – Best Performance in a British Feature Film | Fish Tank | Won | |
| 2009 | British Independent Film Awards | Best Actress | Fish Tank | Nominated | |
| 2009 | British Independent Film Awards | Most Promising Newcomer | Fish Tank | Won | |
| 2009 | European Film Awards | Best Actress | Fish Tank | Nominated | |
| 2010 | Evening Standard British Film Awards | Most Promising Newcomer | Fish Tank | Nominated | |
| 2010 | London Film Critics' Circle Awards | British Actress of the Year | Fish Tank | Nominated | |
| 2010 | London Film Critics' Circle Awards | The NSPCC Award – Young British Performer of the Year | Fish Tank | Won | |
| 2010 | Empire Awards | Best Newcomer | Fish Tank | Nominated | |
| 2018 | TV Choice Awards | Best Soap Newcomer | EastEnders | Nominated | |
| 2018 | New Renaissance Film Festival | Best Actress in a British Film | I Was 3 | Won | |
| 2018 | Inside Soap Awards | Best Newcomer | EastEnders | Nominated | |
| 2018 | Inside Soap Awards | Best Bad Girl | EastEnders | Nominated | |
| 2018 | Digital Spy Soap Awards | Best Soap Newcomer | EastEnders | Third | |
