= Gavin Rothery (filmmaker) =

Screenwriter, director and designer

Gavin Rothery is a British screenwriter, director and designer. He wrote and directed the 2020 science fiction film Archive, and was the conceptual designer / head of graphic design on 2009 film Moon.
