= Moon (2009 film) =

2009 film by Duncan Jones

- Theatrical release poster
- Directed by: Duncan Jones
- Written by: Nathan Parker
- Story by: Duncan Jones
- Produced by: Stuart Fenegan; Trudie Styler
- Starring: Sam Rockwell; Dominique McElligott; Kaya Scodelario; Benedict Wong; Matt Berry; Malcolm Stewart
- Cinematography: Gary Shaw
- Edited by: Nicholas Gastor
- Music by: Clint Mansell
- Production companies: Liberty Films; Xingu Films; Limelight
- Distributed by: Sony Pictures Classics; Stage 6 Films
- Release dates: 23 January 2009 (Sundance); 12 June 2009 (United States); 17 July 2009 (United Kingdom)
- Running time: 97 minutes
- Countries: United Kingdom; United States
- Language: English
- Budget: $5 million
- Box office: $9.8 million

Moon is a 2009 science fiction film directed by Duncan Jones (in his directorial debut), written by Nathan Parker from a story by Jones. It stars Sam Rockwell as Sam Bell, a man who experiences a personal crisis as he nears the end of a three-year solitary stint mining helium-3 on the far side of the Moon. Dominique McElligott, Kaya Scodelario, Benedict Wong, Matt Berry, Malcolm Stewart, and Kevin Spacey appear in supporting roles.

Moon premiered at the 2009 Sundance Film Festival and was released in selected cinemas in New York and Los Angeles on 12 June 2009. The release was expanded to additional theatres in the United States on 10 July and to the United Kingdom on 17 July. A follow-up film containing an epilogue to the film's events, Mute, was released in 2018. A third installment, a graphic novel called Madi: Once Upon a Time in the Future, was released in 2020.

Moon was modestly budgeted and grossed just under $10 million worldwide. It was well-received by critics, with Rockwell's performance garnering significant praise. The film won numerous film critic and film festival awards and was nominated for the BAFTA Award for Best British Film, and won the Hugo Award for Best Dramatic Presentation in 2010.

== Plot ==
After an oil crisis, Lunar Industries makes a fortune by building Sarang Station, a facility on the far side of the Moon to mine the alternative fuel helium-3. The facility requires only one human to maintain operations and launch canisters bound for Earth containing helium-3. Samuel Bell has two weeks before ending his three-year work contract there. (Note: A computer screen shows a date of 2035 in one scene towards the end.) Chronic communication problems have disabled all live communications with Earth and limit him to occasional recorded messages from his wife Tess, who was pregnant with their daughter Eve when he left.

Sam begins to suffer from hallucinations of a teenage girl and a disheveled man. One such image distracts him while he is out recovering a canister, causing him to crash his rover and fall unconscious.

Sam awakes in the base infirmary with no memory of the accident. He overhears GERTY, an artificial intelligence which assists him, having a live chat with Lunar Industries management, despite the apparent communications failure. Lunar Industries orders Sam to remain on base and says that a rescue team will arrive for repairs. Suspicious, Sam fakes an emergency to persuade GERTY to let him outside. He travels to the crashed rover and finds his unconscious doppelganger. He takes the double back to the base, and GERTY tends to his injuries. The two Sams start to wonder if one of them is a clone of the other. After an argument and physical altercation, GERTY reveals that they are both clones of the original Sam Bell. GERTY activated the newest clone after the crash and convinced him that he was at the beginning of his three-year contract. His memories of his wife and daughter are implanted.

The two Sams search the area, finding a communications substation beyond the facility's perimeter which has been interfering with the live feed from Earth. GERTY helps the older Sam access the recorded logs of past clones, who all fell ill as their contract expired, and he realizes that he is headed towards a similar fate, having already started to experience symptoms. Later, the older Sam discovers a secret vault containing hundreds of hibernating clones. Lunar Industries is using clones of the original Sam Bell to avoid the cost of training and transporting new astronauts, as well as deliberately jamming the live feed to prevent the clones from contacting Earth; clones, who believe they are entering hibernation at the end of their contract before their final return to Earth, are actually incinerated. The older Sam drives past the interference radius in another rover and tries to call Tess on Earth. He instead makes contact with a teenage girl. He asks to speak to Tess. She says Tess passed away years ago. The older Sam asks is she is sure. The girl replies that she should know, as she is her daughter, Eve. The older Sam asks how old she is. Eve replies that she is 15 years old. Taken aback, the older Sam then asks "how did mommy die?" Scared, Eve calls to her father off camera that someone is asking about mom. He hangs up when the original Sam on Earth can be heared replying "who’s asking about mom?" Returning, the older Sam's physical deterioration worsens.

The two Sams realize that the incoming rescue team will kill them both if they are found together. The newer Sam convinces GERTY to wake another clone, planning to leave the awakened clone in the crashed rover and send the older Sam to Earth in one of the helium-3 transports. However, the older Sam, having learned that the clones break down at the end of the 3-year contract, knows that he will not live much longer. With his health declining, the older Sam suggests that he be placed back into the crashed rover to die so that Lunar Industries will not suspect anything, while the newer Sam escapes.

Following GERTY's advice, the newer Sam reboots GERTY to wipe its records of the events. Before leaving, the newer clone reprograms a harvester to crash and wreck the jamming antenna, thereby enabling live communications with Earth; he also takes a helium-3 canister with him to Earth. The older Sam, back in the crippled rover, remains conscious long enough to watch the launch of the transport carrying the newer Sam. The rescue team is fooled after finding both a newly-awakened clone in the medical bay and the corpse of the older Sam inside the crashed rover. Lunar Industries' stock crashes after the newer Sam lands on Earth and becomes a whistleblower.

== Cast ==
- Sam Rockwell as Sam Bell
- Dominique McElligott as Tess Bell
- Kaya Scodelario as Eve Bell
  - Rosie Shaw as Younger Eve
- Benedict Wong as Thompson
- Matt Berry as Overmeyers
- Malcolm Stewart as the technician
- Kevin Spacey as the voice of GERTY

Additionally, Robin Chalk appears as Rockwell's body double in portraying the Sam Bell clones.

== Production ==
This was the feature film directorial debut for Duncan Jones, who co-wrote with Nathan Parker. The film was specifically written as a vehicle for actor Sam Rockwell. Rockwell almost turned the film down and Paddy Considine was an alternative choice. The film pays homage to the films of Jones' youth, such as Silent Running (1972), Alien (1979), and Outland (1981). In an interview with Wired.com, speaking about those films, Jones stated it was his "intent to write for a science fiction-literate audience" and that he "wanted to make a film which would be appreciated by people like myself who loved those films". Conceptual design was from Gavin Rothery.

Jones described his interest in the lunar setting:

[We] wanted to create something which felt comfortable within that canon of those science fiction films from the sort of late seventies to early eighties. For me, the Moon has this weird mythic nature to it. ... There is still a mystery to it. As a location, it bridges the gap between science fiction and science fact. We (humankind) have been there. It is something so close and so plausible and yet at the same time, we really don't know that much about it.

The director described the lack of romance in the Moon as a location, citing images from the Japanese lunar orbiter SELENE: "It's the desolation and emptiness of it ... it looks like some strange ball of clay in blackness. ... Look at photos and you'll think that they're monochrome. In fact, they're not. There simply are no primary colours." Jones made reference to the photography book Full Moon by Michael Light in designing the look of the film.

Moon's budget was US$5 million. The director took steps to minimise production costs, such as keeping the cast small and filming in a studio. Moon was produced at Shepperton Studios, in London, where it was filmed in 33 days. Jones preferred using models to digital animation, working with Bill Pearson, the supervising model maker on Alien, to help design the lunar rovers and helium-3 harvesters in the film. The Moon base was created as a full 360-degree set, measuring 85–90 feet (26–27 m) long and approximately 70 feet (21 m) wide. The Moon base's artificial intelligence, GERTY, was designed to be bound to an overhead rail within the mining base since its mechanical tether was critical to the story's plot. Spacey's vocal portrayal of GERTY was heavily influenced by HAL in 2001: A Space Odyssey (1968), voiced by Douglas Rain. The visual effects were provided by Cinesite, which has sought cut-price deals with independent films. Since Jones had an effects background with TV advertisements, he drew on his experience to create special effects within a small budget.

To save further on production costs, Jones re-used several set pieces from an abandoned movie based on the BBC TV sci-fi comedy Red Dwarf. These include the sleeping quarters and the corridor of the "secret room".

== Release ==
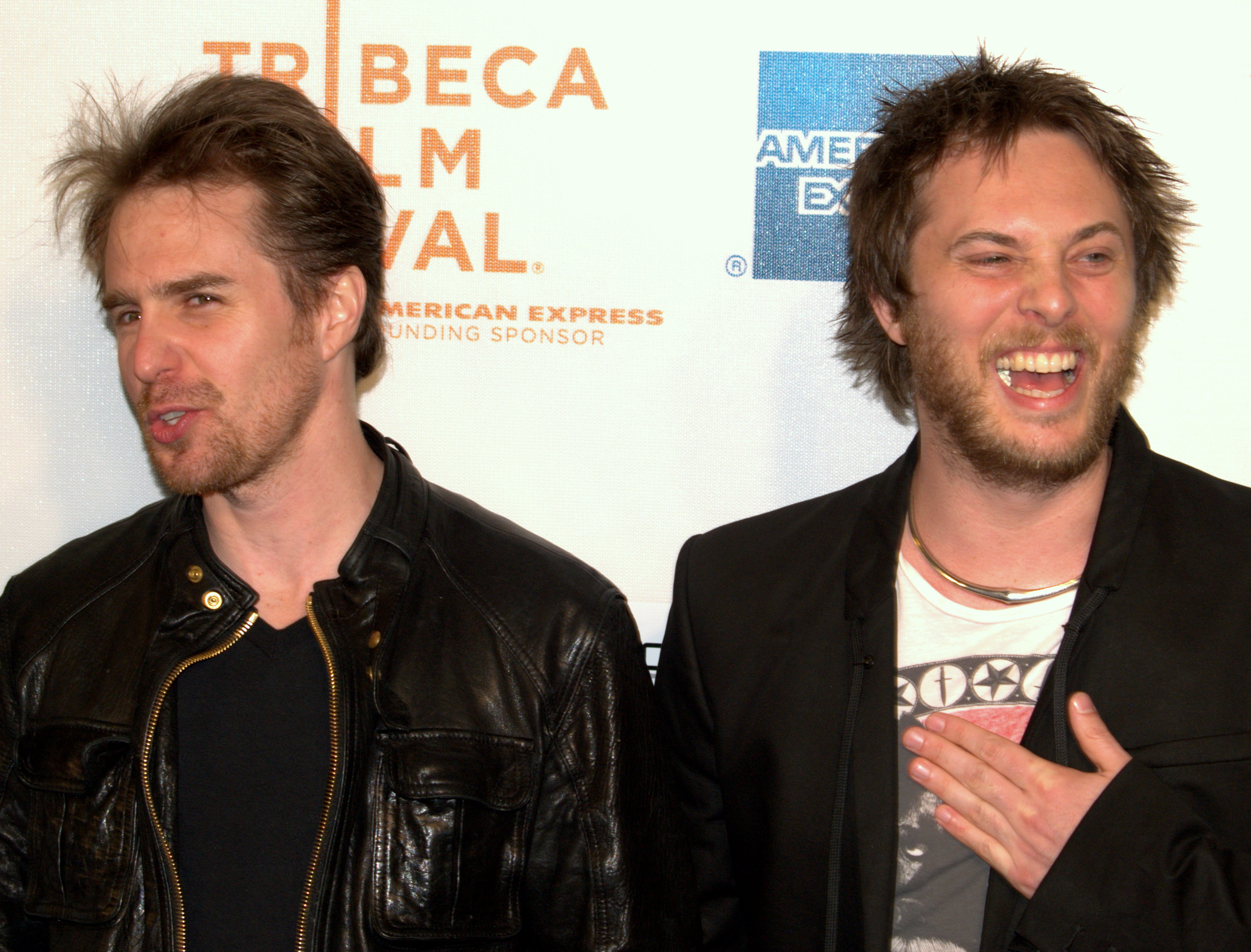
Sam Rockwell and Duncan Jones at the 2009 Tribeca Film Festival screening

International sales for Moon are handled by the Independent sales company. In May 2009, Sony Pictures Worldwide Acquisitions Group acquired distribution rights to the film for English-speaking territories, acquiring rights later that month to Asia excluding South Korea, Italy, Spain and Latin America as well. Sony Pictures Worldwide Acquisitions Group was considering making Moon a direct-to-DVD release; however, after Moon premiered at the 2009 Sundance Film Festival in January 2009, Sony Pictures Classics decided to handle this film's theatrical release for Sony Pictures Worldwide Acquisitions Group.

Sony Pictures Classics distributed the film in the United States, beginning with a limited release in cinemas in New York and Los Angeles on 12 June. The film's British premiere was held on 20 June 2009 at the Cameo Cinema in Edinburgh as part of the 63rd Edinburgh International Film Festival. Jones was present at the screening along with other key crew members. The full UK release was on 17 July. The Australian release was on 8 October.

A high-resolution, 4K remastered version of the film was released on 16 July 2019 for the tenth anniversary of the film.

=== Box office ===
Moon grossed £700,396 from its domestic UK release, $3.4 million from its North American release and $9.8 million worldwide.

=== Critical reception ===
Moon was generally well received by critics. On the review aggregator website Rotten Tomatoes, 90% of 195 critics' reviews are positive, with an average rating of 7.5/10. The website's consensus reads: "Boosted by Sam Rockwell's intense performance, Moon is a compelling work of science-fiction, and a promising debut from director Duncan Jones." Metacritic, which uses a weighted average, assigned the film a score of 67 out of 100, based on 29 critics, indicating "generally favorable" reviews.

Damon Wise of The Times praised Jones' "thoughtful" direction and Rockwell's "poignant" performance. Wise wrote of the film's approach to the science fiction genre: "Though it uses impressive sci-fi trappings to tell its story – the fabulous models and moonscapes are recognisably retro yet surprisingly real – this is a film about what it means, and takes, to be human." Duane Byrge of The Hollywood Reporter applauded screenwriter Nathan Parker's "sharp [and] individualistic" dialogue and the way in which Parker combined science fiction and Big Brother themes. Byrge also believed that cinematographer Gary Shaw's work and composer Clint Mansell's music intensified the drama. Byrge wrote: "Nonetheless, 'Moon' is darkened by its own excellencies: The white, claustrophobic look is apt and moody, but a lack of physical action enervates the story thrust." The critic felt mixed about the star's performance, describing him as "adept at limning his character's dissolution" but finding that he did not have "the audacious, dominant edge" for the major confrontation at the end of the film. Roger Ebert, giving the film three and a half stars out of four, wrote:

Moon is a superior example of that threatened genre, hard science-fiction, which is often about the interface between humans and alien intelligence of one kind of or other, including digital. John W. Campbell Jr., the godfather of this genre, would have approved. The movie is really all about ideas. It only seems to be about emotions. How real are our emotions, anyway? How real are we? Someday I will die. This laptop I'm using is patient and can wait.

Empire magazine praised Rockwell's performance, including it in '10 Egregious Oscar Snubs—The worthy contenders that the Academy overlooked' feature and referred to his performance as "one [...] of the best performances of the year". Rolling Stone magazine ranked the film at number 23 on their Top 40 Sci-Fi Movies of the 21st Century, finding that "Duncan Jones' debut feature keeps you wondering whether its hero – played by an on-point Sam Rockwell – is losing a battle with what appears to be his "double" or if he, is, in fact, losing his mind [...] this sci-fi indie does a helluva lot with very, very little". Digital Spy said it was an "incredible low-budget science fiction movie", opining that Jones' direction of the film "brilliantly explores ideas of identity while mixing in some practical VFX spectacle to boot. This is perhaps one of the best sci-fi films of the 21st century".

A. O. Scott, chief film critic for The New York Times wrote that Jones directing "demonstrates impressive technical command, infusing a sparse narrative and a small, enclosed space with a surprising density of moods and ideas". Scott said that like most of science fiction, the film "is a meditation on the conflict between the streamlining tendencies of technological progress and the stubborn persistence of feelings and desires that can't be tamed by utilitarian imperatives", while also asserting that "the film's ideas are interesting, but don't feel entirely worked out [...]the smallness of this movie is decidedly a virtue, but also, in the end, something of a limitation". Moon also received positive reviews at the Sundance Film Festival.

=== Reception from the scientific community ===
Moon was screened as part of a lecture series at NASA's Space Center Houston, at the request of a professor there. "He'd been reading online that we'd done this film about helium-3 mining and that's something that people at NASA are working on", says Jones. "We did a Q&A afterward. They asked me why the base looked so sturdy, like a bunker, and not like the kind of stuff they are designing that they are going to transport with them. I said 'Well, in the future I assume you won't want to continue carrying everything with you – you'll want to use the resources on the moon to build things,' and a woman in the audience raised her hand and said, 'I'm actually working on something called mooncrete, which is concrete that mixes lunar regolith and ice water from the Moon's polar caps.'"

In the 2013 October issue of the journal Trends in Cognitive Sciences, academics ranked their top brain science movies of all time; their database being compiled by cognitive science researchers who are also movie buffs. The database, called the Cognitive Science Movie Index, ranks films for quality, relevance and accuracy in the field of cognitive science. On their top 10 lists of brain science movies of all time, Moon appears at number 5 on the quality list, number 9 on the accuracy list and number 3 on the relevance list.

== Accolades ==
Awards
Award	Date of ceremony	Category	Recipients	Result
Austin Film Critics Association Awards	15 December 2009	Austin Film Critics Award for Best Film	Moon	Nominated
BAFTA Awards	21 February 2010	BAFTA Award for Outstanding Debut by a British Writer, Director or Producer	Duncan Jones	Won
BAFTA Awards	21 February 2010	BAFTA Award for Outstanding British Film	Stuart Fenegan, Trudie Styler, Duncan Jones, Nathan Parker	Nominated
British Independent Film Awards	6 December 2009	Best British Independent Film	Moon	Won
British Independent Film Awards	6 December 2009	Douglas Hickox Award	Duncan Jones	Won
British Independent Film Awards	6 December 2009	Best Director	Duncan Jones	Nominated
British Independent Film Awards	6 December 2009	Best Performance by an Actor in a British Independent Film	Sam Rockwell	Nominated
British Independent Film Awards	6 December 2009	Best Screenplay	Nathan Parker	Nominated
British Independent Film Awards	6 December 2009	Best Technical Achievement	Clint Mansell	Nominated
British Independent Film Awards	6 December 2009	Best Technical Achievement	Tony Noble	Nominated
Chicago Film Critics Association	21 December 2009	Most Promising Filmmaker	Duncan Jones	Nominated
Edinburgh International Film Festival	28 June 2009	Best New British Feature	Moon	Won
Empire Awards	28 March 2010	Empire Award for Best Sci-Fi/Fantasy	Moon	Nominated
Espoo Ciné International Film Festival	29 August 2010	Grand Prize of European Fantasy Film in Gold	Duncan Jones, Stuart Fenegan	Won
Evening Standard British Film Awards	8 February 2010	Evening Standard British Film Award for Most Promising Newcomer	Duncan Jones	Nominated
Evening Standard British Film Awards	8 February 2010	Evening Standard British Film Award for Best Technical Achievement	Tony Noble	Nominated
Fantastic'Arts	31 January 2010	Jury Prize	Duncan Jones	Won
Fantastic'Arts	31 January 2010	Special Prize	Duncan Jones	Won
Gaudí Awards	1 February 2010	Gaudí Award for Best European Film	Duncan Jones	Nominated
Hugo Awards	5 September 2010	Hugo Award for Best Dramatic Presentation - Long Form	Nathan Parker, Duncan Jones	Won
Irish Film & Television Awards	20 February 2010	IFTA Award for Best International Actor	Sam Rockwell	Nominated
London Film Critics' Circle Awards	18 February 2010	ALFS Award for British Director of the Year	Duncan Jones	Won
London Film Critics' Circle Awards	18 February 2010	ALFS Award for British Director of the Year	Duncan Jones	Nominated
London Film Critics' Circle Awards	18 February 2010	ALFS Award for British Film of the Year	Moon	Nominated
National Board of Review of Motion Pictures	12 January 2010	NBR Award for Best Directorial Debut	Duncan Jones	Won
National Board of Review of Motion Pictures	12 January 2010	NBR Award - Top Independent Films	Moon	Won
Phoenix Film Critics Society Awards	22 December 2009	Overlooked Film of the Year	Moon	Won
Saturn Awards	24 June 2010	Saturn Award for Best Actor	Sam Rockwell	Nominated
Saturn Awards	24 June 2010	Saturn Award for Best Science Fiction Film	Moon	Nominated
Seattle International Film Festival	14 June 2009	Golden Space Needle Award for Best Actor	Sam Rockwell	Won
Sitges Film Festival	11 October 2009	Best Actor	Sam Rockwell	Won
Sitges Film Festival	11 October 2009	Best Film	Moon	Won
Sitges Film Festival	11 October 2009	Best Production Design	Tony Noble	Won
Sitges Film Festival	11 October 2009	Best Screenplay	Nathan Parker	Won
Writers' Guild of Great Britain	22 November 2010	Writers' Guild of Great Britain Award for Best First Feature-Length Film Screenplay	Duncan Jones, Nathan Parker	Won

== Sequels ==
Moon is the first installment in Jones's sci-fi "Mooniverse" saga, three loosely-connected stories that take place in a shared future. The second, Mute (2018), is about a mute bartender searching for a missing woman. In it, a TV broadcast of a court trial can be seen, in which Sam Bell and several of his clones are shown in the courtroom identifying themselves in an "I'm Spartacus" allusion. A third installment, Madi: Once Upon a Time in the Future, was released as a graphic novel in 2020.

== See also ==
- Teletransportation paradox
- Colonization of the Moon
- Survival film
- Mickey 17
- The 6th Day
- Dual (2022 film)
- Moon (soundtrack)
