= National Board of Review Awards 2009 =

Annual US film awards ceremony

81st NBR Awards

January 12, 2010

Best Film: Up in the Air

The 81st National Board of Review Awards, honoring the best in film for 2009, are given on January 12, 2010.

== Top 10 Films ==
Up in the Air

- (500) Days of Summer
- An Education
- The Hurt Locker
- Inglourious Basterds
- Invictus
- The Messenger
- A Serious Man
- Star Trek
- Up
- Where the Wild Things Are

== Winners ==
Best Film:

- Up in the Air

Best Director:

- Clint Eastwood – Invictus

Best Actor (tie):

- Morgan Freeman – Invictus
- George Clooney – Up in the Air

Best Actress:

- Carey Mulligan – An Education

Best Supporting Actor:

- Woody Harrelson – The Messenger

Best Supporting Actress:

- Anna Kendrick – Up in the Air

Best Screenplay – Original:

- Joel and Ethan Coen – A Serious Man

Best Screenplay – Adapted:

- Jason Reitman and Sheldon Turner – Up in the Air

Best Animated Feature:

- Up

Best Foreign Language Film:

- A Prophet, France

Best Documentary Feature:

- The Cove

Best Ensemble Cast:

- It's Complicated

Breakthrough Male Performances:

- Jeremy Renner – The Hurt Locker

Breakthrough Female Performances:

- Gabourey Sidibe – Precious

Best Directorial Debut (tie):

- Duncan Jones – Moon
- Oren Moverman – The Messenger
- Marc Webb – (500) Days of Summer

Special Filmmaking Achievement Award:

- Wes Anderson – Fantastic Mr. Fox

William K. Everson Award for Film History:

- Jean Picker Firstenberg

Freedom of Expression Award:

- Burma VJ: Reporting from a Closed Country
- Invictus
- The Most Dangerous Man in America: Daniel Ellsberg and the Pentagon Papers

== Top Foreign Films ==
A Prophet, France

- The Maid
- Revanche
- The Song of Sparrows
- Three Monkeys
- The White Ribbon

== Top Documentaries ==
The Cove

- Burma VJ: Reporting from a Closed Country
- Crude
- Food, Inc.
- Good Hair
- The Most Dangerous Man in America: Daniel Ellsberg and the Pentagon Papers

== Top Independent Films ==
- Amreeka
- District 9
- Goodbye Solo
- Humpday
- In the Loop
- Julia
- Me and Orson Welles
- Moon
- Sugar
- Two Lovers
