= Chicago Film Critics Association Awards 2009 =

Annual US film awards ceremony

22nd CFCA Awards

December 21, 2009

Best Film:
The Hurt Locker

The 22nd Chicago Film Critics Association Awards, given by the CFCA on December 21, 2009, honored the best in film for 2009.

== Winners and nominees ==
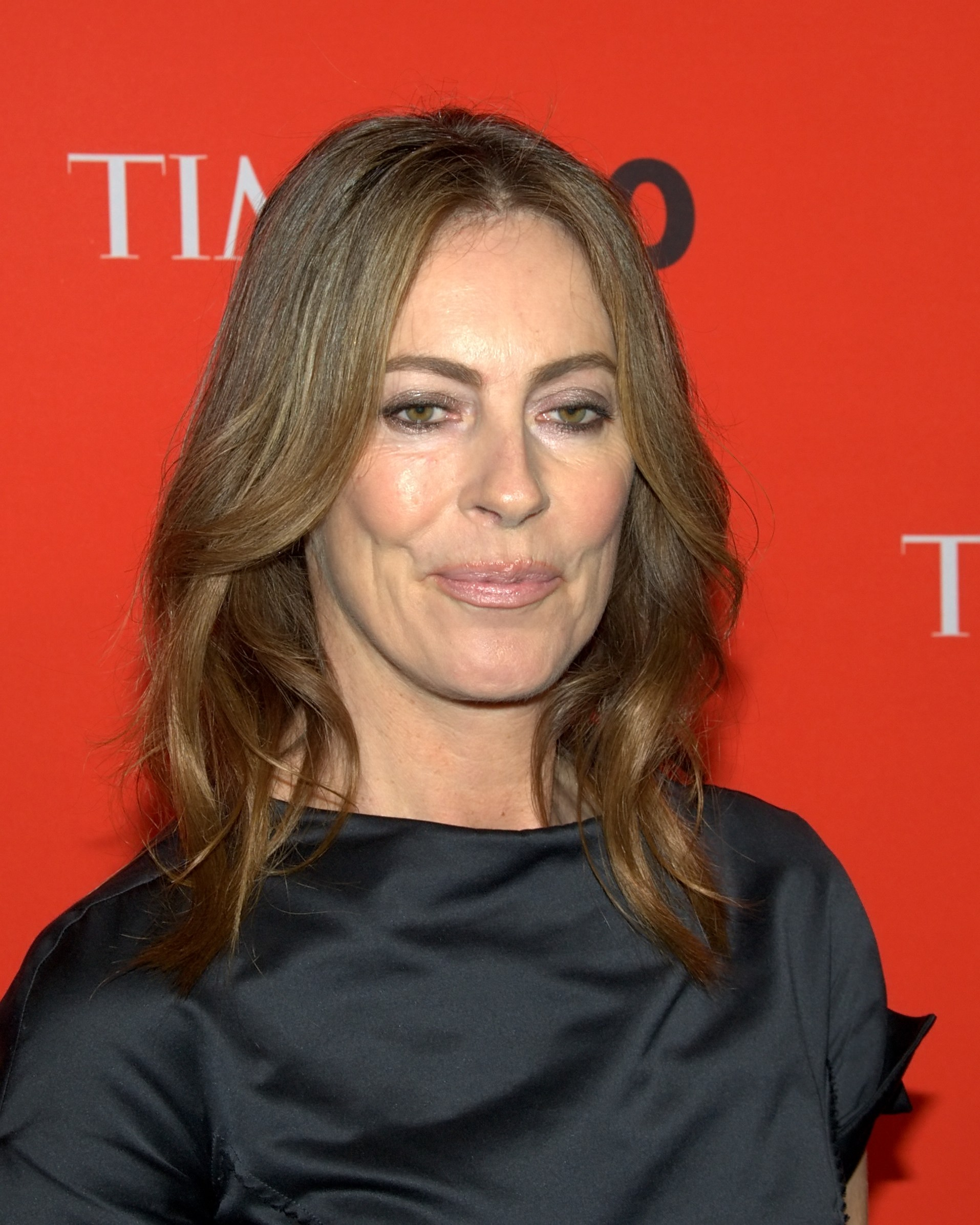
Kathryn Bigelow, Best Director winner

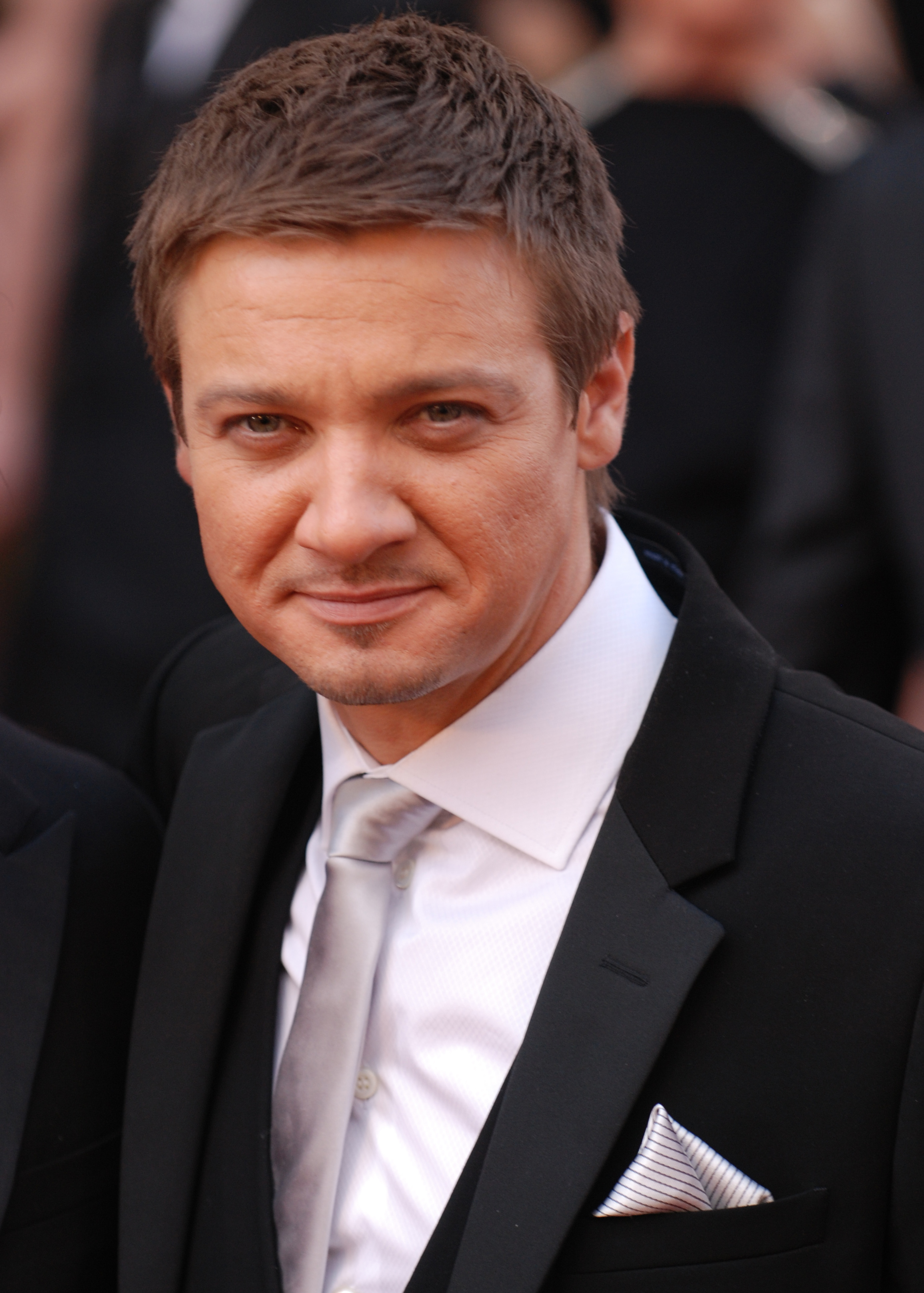
Jeremy Renner, Best Actor winner

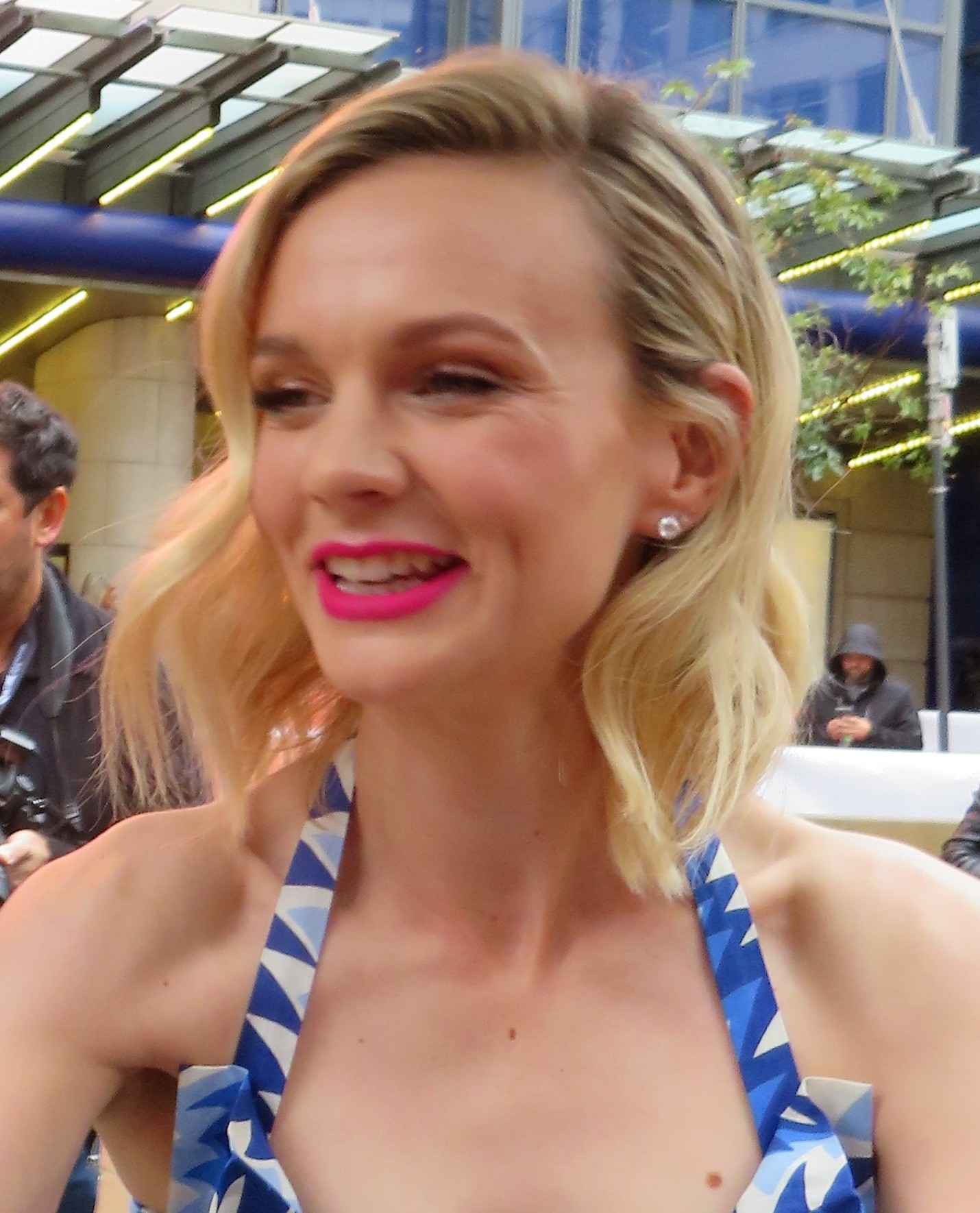
Carey Mulligan, Best Actress winner

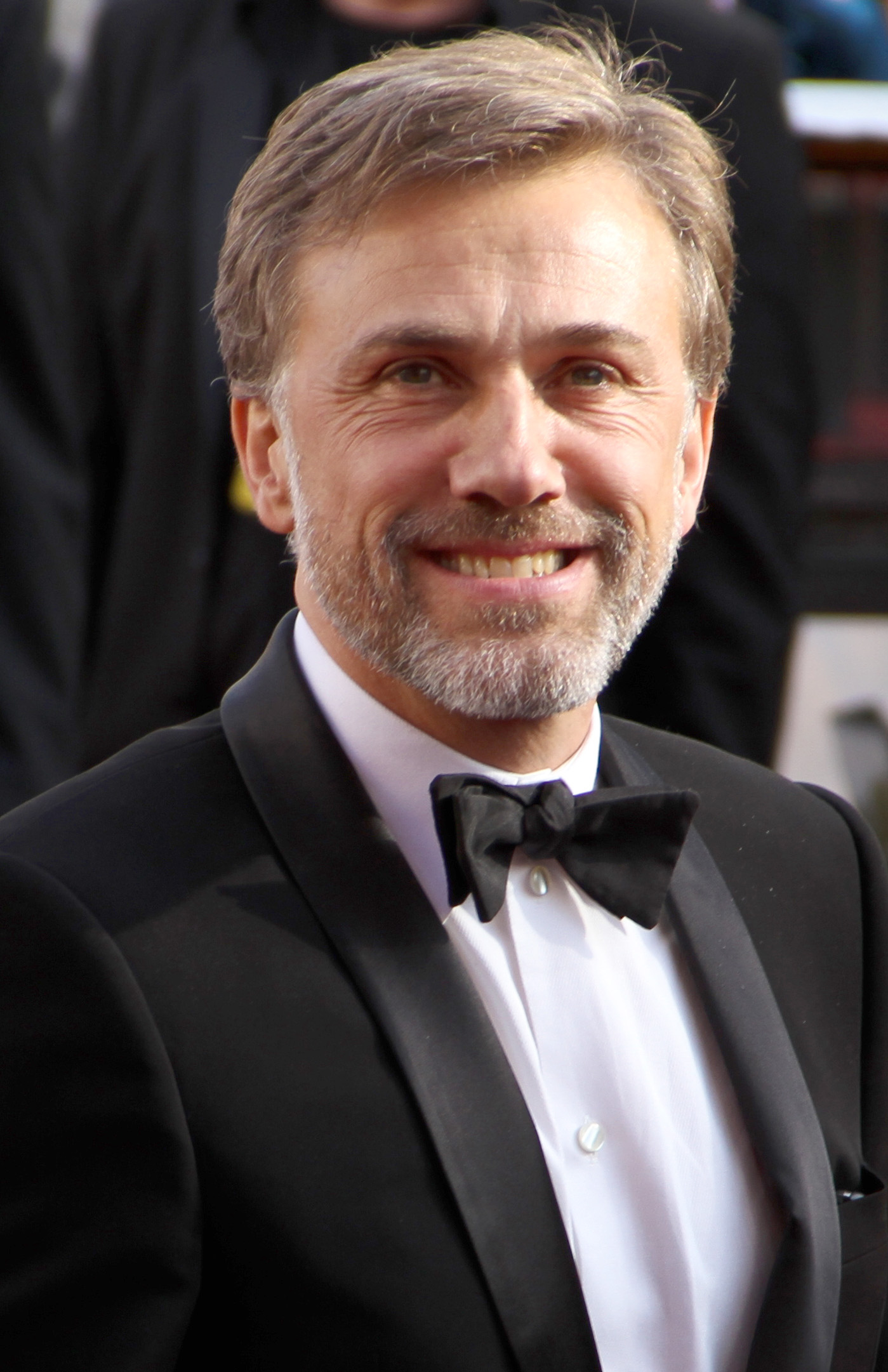
Christoph Waltz, Best Supporting Actor winner

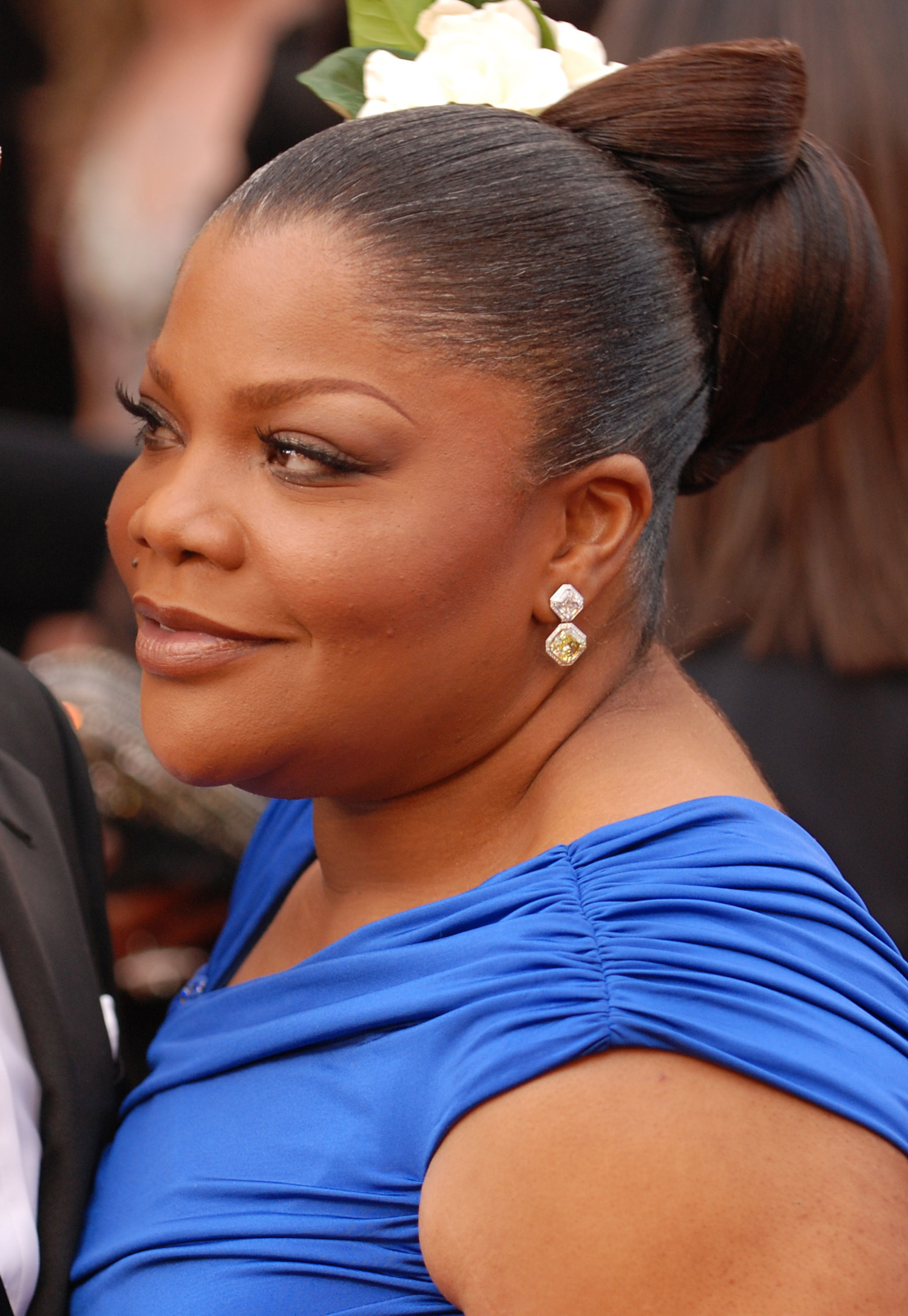
Mo'Nique, Best Supporting Actress winner

=== Best Actor ===
Jeremy Renner – The Hurt Locker

- Jeff Bridges – Crazy Heart
- George Clooney – Up in the Air
- Matt Damon – The Informant!
- Michael Stuhlbarg – A Serious Man

=== Best Actress ===
Carey Mulligan – An Education

- Abbie Cornish – Bright Star
- Maya Rudolph – Away We Go
- Gabourey Sidibe – Precious
- Meryl Streep – Julie & Julia

=== Best Animated Film ===
Up

- Coraline
- Fantastic Mr. Fox
- Ponyo
- The Princess and the Frog

=== Best Cinematography ===
The Hurt Locker – Barry Ackroyd

- Avatar – Mauro Fiore
- Bright Star – Greig Fraser
- Inglourious Basterds – Robert Richardson
- Where the Wild Things Are – Lance Acord

=== Best Director ===
Kathryn Bigelow – The Hurt Locker

- Joel Coen and Ethan Coen – A Serious Man
- Spike Jonze – Where the Wild Things Are
- Jason Reitman – Up in the Air
- Quentin Tarantino – Inglourious Basterds

=== Best Documentary Film ===
Anvil! The Story of Anvil

- Capitalism: A Love Story
- The Cove
- Food, Inc.
- Tyson

=== Best Film ===
The Hurt Locker

- Inglourious Basterds
- A Serious Man
- Up in the Air
- Where the Wild Things Are

=== Best Foreign Language Film ===
The White Ribbon, Germany

- Broken Embraces, Spain
- Red Cliff, China/Hong Kong
- Sin Nombre, Spain
- Summer Hours, France

=== Best Original Score ===
Up – Michael Giacchino

- Avatar – James Horner
- Fantastic Mr. Fox – Alexandre Desplat
- The Informant! – Marvin Hamlisch
- Where the Wild Things Are – Carter Burwell & Karen Orzolek

=== Best Screenplay – Adapted ===
Up in the Air – Jason Reitman & Sheldon Turner

- An Education – Nick Hornby
- In the Loop – Jesse Armstrong, Simon Blackwell, Armando Iannucci & Tony Roche
- The Informant! – Scott Z. Burns
- Where the Wild Things Are – Spike Jonze & Dave Eggers

=== Best Screenplay – Original ===
The Hurt Locker – Mark Boal

- Away We Go – Dave Eggers & Vendela Vida
- Inglourious Basterds – Quentin Tarantino
- A Serious Man – Joel Coen and Ethan Coen
- Up – Bob Peterson

=== Best Supporting Actor ===
Christoph Waltz – Inglourious Basterds

- Peter Capaldi – In the Loop
- Woody Harrelson – The Messenger
- Christian McKay – Me and Orson Welles
- Stanley Tucci – The Lovely Bones

=== Best Supporting Actress ===
Mo'Nique – Precious

- Vera Farmiga – Up in the Air
- Anna Kendrick – Up in the Air
- Julianne Moore – A Single Man
- Natalie Portman – Brothers

=== Most Promising Filmmaker ===
Neill Blomkamp – District 9

- Scott Cooper – Crazy Heart
- Cary Fukunaga – Sin Nombre
- Duncan Jones – Moon
- Marc Webb – (500) Days of Summer

=== Most Promising Performer ===
Carey Mulligan – An Education

- Sharlto Copley – District 9
- Christian McKay – Me and Orson Welles
- Max Records – Where the Wild Things Are
- Gabourey Sidibe – Precious
