= British Independent Film Awards 2009 =

Film award edition

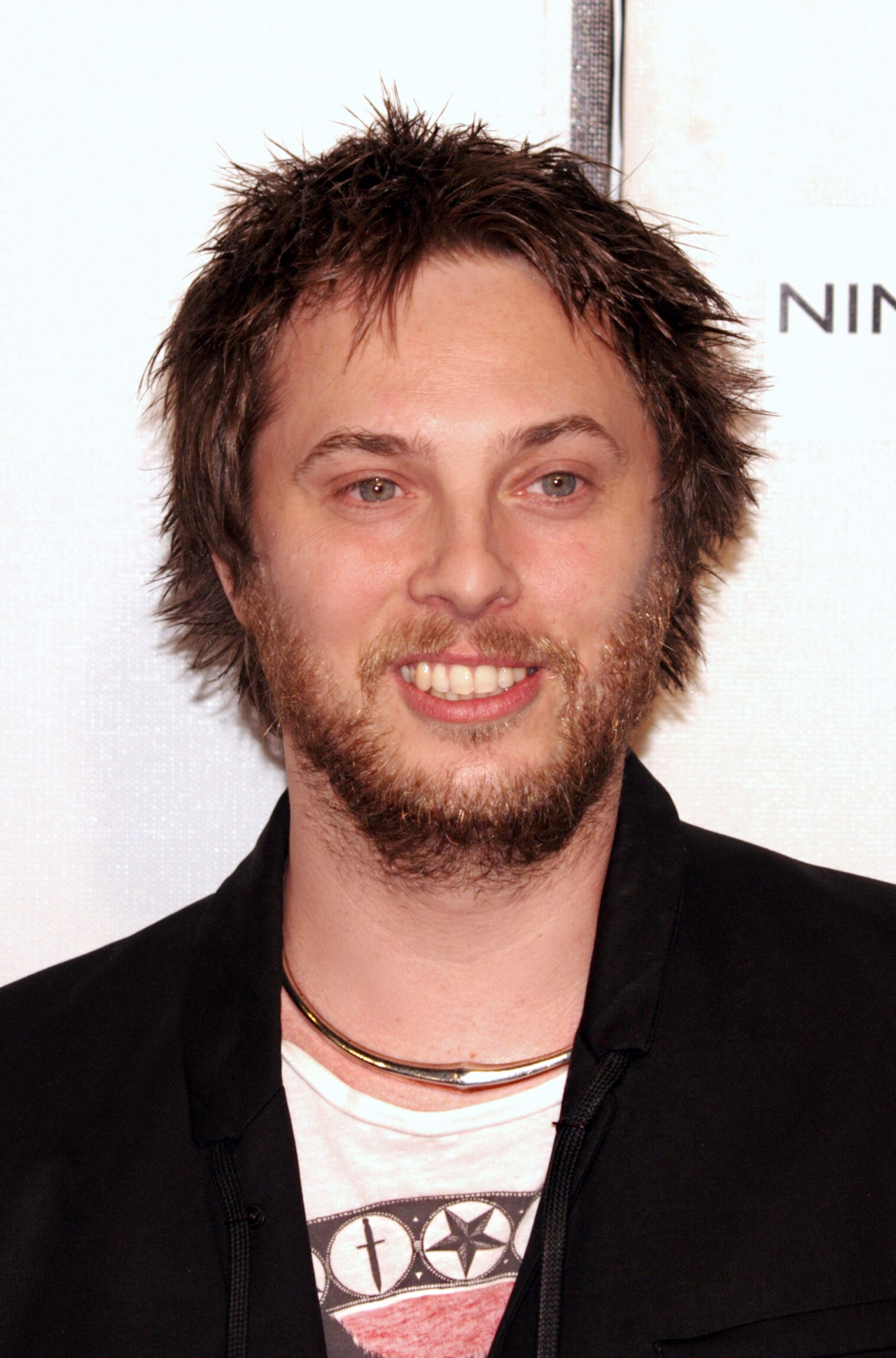
Duncan Jones at the 2009 Tribeca Film Festival for the premiere of 'Moon'

The 12th British Independent Film Awards, held on 6 December 2009 at The Brewery in West London, honoured the best British independent films of 2009.

== Awards ==
The winner is bolded at the top of each section.

=== Best British Independent Film ===
- **Moon**
- An Education
- Fish Tank
- In the Loop
- Nowhere Boy

=== Best Director ===
- **Andrea Arnold – Fish Tank**
- Armando Iannucci – In the Loop
- Duncan Jones – Moon
- Jane Campion – Bright Star
- Lone Scherfig – An Education

=== The Douglas Hickox Award ===
Given to a British director on their debut feature

- **Duncan Jones – Moon**
- Armando Iannucci – In the Loop
- Peter Strickland – Katalin Varga
- Sam Taylor Wood – Nowhere Boy
- Samantha Morton – The Unloved

=== Best Actor ===
- **Tom Hardy – Bronson**
- Aaron Johnson – Nowhere Boy
- Andy Serkis – Sex & Drugs & Rock & Roll
- Peter Capaldi – In the Loop
- Sam Rockwell – Moon

=== Best Actress ===
- **Carey Mulligan – An Education**
- Abbie Cornish – Bright Star
- Emily Blunt – The Young Victoria
- Katie Jarvis – Fish Tank
- Sophie Okonedo – Skin

=== Best Supporting Actor ===
- **John Henshaw – Looking for Eric**
- Alfred Molina – An Education
- Jim Broadbent – The Damned United
- Michael Fassbender – Fish Tank
- Tom Hollander – In the Loop

=== Best Supporting Actress ===
- **Anne-Marie Duff – Nowhere Boy**
- Kerry Fox – Bright Star
- Kierston Wareing – Fish Tank
- Kristin Scott Thomas – Nowhere Boy
- Rosamund Pike – An Education

=== Best Screenplay ===
- **In the Loop – Jesse Armstrong, Simon Blackwell, Armando Iannucci, Tony Roche**
- An Education – Nick Hornby
- Fish Tank – Andrea Arnold
- Moon – Nathan Parker
- Nowhere Boy – Matt Greenhalgh

=== Most Promising Newcomer ===
- **Katie Jarvis – Fish Tank**
- Christian McKay – Me and Orson Welles
- Edward Hogg – White Lightnin'
- George MacKay – The Boys Are Back
- Hilda Péter – Katalin Varga

=== Best Achievement In Production ===
- **Bunny and the Bull**
- Bronson
- The Hide
- The Imaginarium of Doctor Parnassus
- Katalin Varga

=== Best Technical Achievement ===
- **Bright Star – Cinematography – Greig Fraser**
- Bunny and the Bull – Production Design – Gary Williamson
- Fish Tank – Cinematography – Robbie Ryan
- Moon – Original Score – Clint Mansell
- Moon – Production Design – Tony Noble

=== Best British Documentary ===
- **Mugabe and the White African**
- The Age of Stupid
- The End of The Line
- Sons of Cuba
- Sounds Like Teen Spirit

=== Best British Short ===
- **Love You More**
- Christmas with Dad
- Leaving
- Sidney Turtlebaum
- Washdays

=== Best Foreign Film ===
- **Let the Right One In**
- Il Divo
- The Hurt Locker
- Sin Nombre
- The Wrestler

=== Raindance Award ===
- **Down Terrace**
- Colin
- The Disappearance of Alice Creed
- Exam
- They Call It Acid

=== The Richard Harris Award ===
- **Daniel Day-Lewis**

=== The Variety Award ===
- **Sir Michael Caine**

=== The Special Jury Prize ===
- **Baz Bamigboye**
