= NYT's 100 Best Movies of the 21st Century (June 2025) =

2025 list of films voted to be the best of the 21st century

The 100 Best Movies of the 21st Century is a list compiled in June 2025 by The New York Times, chosen by a voting poll of over 500 directors, actors and others around the world.

== Top 50 ==
Title	Director
Parasite (2019) (South Korea)	Bong Joon Ho
Mulholland Drive (2001) (United States)	David Lynch
There Will Be Blood (2007) (United States)	Paul Thomas Anderson
In the Mood for Love (2000) (Hong Kong)	Wong Kar-wai
Moonlight (2016) (United States)	Barry Jenkins
No Country for Old Men (2007) (United States)	Joel Coen and Ethan Coen
Eternal Sunshine of the Spotless Mind (2004) (United States)	Michel Gondry
Get Out (2017) (United States)	Jordan Peele
Spirited Away (2001) (Japan)	Hayao Miyazaki
The Social Network (2010) (United States)	David Fincher
Mad Max: Fury Road (2015) (Australia)	George Miller
The Zone of Interest (2023) (United Kingdom)	Jonathan Glazer
Children of Men (2006) (United Kingdom)	Alfonso Cuarón
Inglourious Basterds (2009) (United States)	Quentin Tarantino
City of God (2003) (Brazil)	Fernando Meirelles
Crouching Tiger, Hidden Dragon (2000) (China) (Taiwan) (Hong Kong)	Ang Lee
Brokeback Mountain (2005) (United States)	Ang Lee
Y tu mamá también (2002) (Mexico)	Alfonso Cuarón
Zodiac (2007) (United States)	David Fincher
The Wolf of Wall Street (2013) (United States)	Martin Scorsese
The Royal Tenenbaums (2001) (United States)	Wes Anderson
The Grand Budapest Hotel (2014) (United States)	Wes Anderson
Boyhood (2014) (United States)	Richard Linklater
Her (2013) (United States)	Spike Jonze
Phantom Thread (2017) (United States)	Paul Thomas Anderson
Anatomy of a Fall (2023) (France)	Justine Triet
Adaptation (2002) (United States)	Spike Jonze
The Dark Knight (2008) (United States)	Christopher Nolan
Arrival (2016) (United States)	Denis Villeneuve
Lost in Translation (2003) (United States)	Sofia Coppola
The Departed (2006) (United States)	Martin Scorsese
Bridesmaids (2011) (United States)	Paul Feig
A Separation (2011) (Iran)	Asghar Farhadi
Wall-E (2008) (United States)	Andrew Stanton
A Prophet (2010) (France)	Jacques Audiard
A Serious Man (2009) (United States)	Ethan Coen and Joel Coen
Call Me by Your Name (2017) (Italy) (United States)	Luca Guadagnino
Portrait of a Lady on Fire (2019) (France)	Céline Sciamma
Lady Bird (2017) (United States)	Greta Gerwig
Yi Yi (2000) (Taiwan)	Edward Yang
Amélie (2001) (France)	Jean-Pierre Jeunet
The Master (2012) (United States)	Paul Thomas Anderson
Oldboy (2003) (South Korea)	Park Chan-wook
Once Upon a Time in Hollywood (2019) (United States)	Quentin Tarantino
Moneyball (2011) (United States)	Bennett Miller
Roma (2018) (Mexico)	Alfonso Cuarón
Almost Famous (2000) (United States)	Cameron Crowe
The Lives of Others (2007) (Germany)	Florian Henckel von Donnersmarck
Before Sunset (2004) (United States)	Richard Linklater
Up (2009) (United States)	Pete Docter

== Results ==
In the list, 45 films belong to the first decade of this century (2000–2009), 33 films between 2010 and 2019 and 22 films between 2019 and 2025. The majority of films in the list come from USA, followed by Europe (mostly United Kingdom and France), Asia (mostly South Korea and Japan) and Latin America (mainly Brazil).

- Bong Joon Ho's Parasite was voted as the top pick on both the original and readers' polls, as was the second top pick, David Lynch's 2001 neo-noir Mulholland Drive.
- Ten films from the list have won the Academy Award for Best Picture: Parasite (1st), Moonlight (5th), No Country for Old Men (6th), The Departed (31st), 12 Years a Slave (51st), Oppenheimer (65th), Spotlight (66th), The Hurt Locker (68th), Everything Everywhere All at Once (77th), and Gladiator (92nd).
- Four animated films appeared on the list, with Hayao Miyazaki's Spirited Away (9th) is the highest-ranking animated feature to be on each list. Other films included Pixar's WALL-E (34th), Up (50th), and Ratatouille (73rd).
- Three documentary films appeared on the list: The Act of Killing (82nd), The Gleaners and I (88th), and Grizzly Man (98th).
- The highest-ranked female-directed film on the list is Justine Triet's Anatomy of a Fall (26th). Although Kátia Lund appears as co-director of City of God (15th), the work is mainly attributed to Fernando Meirelles; therefore, not being credited as the latter's partner, Triet is in the official list in first position.

=== Director's count ===
Fourteen film directors appear more than once in a list. Christopher Nolan earned the most entries with a total of five films.

Count	Director
5	Christopher Nolan
4	Paul Thomas Anderson
4	Joel Coen and Ethan Coen
4	Alfonso Cuarón
3	David Fincher
3	Quentin Tarantino
2	Wes Anderson
2	Bong Joon Ho
2	Jonathan Glazer
2	Spike Jonze
2	Ang Lee
2	Richard Linklater
2	Martin Scorsese

=== Response ===
The Danish film journal 16:9 responded with the six-part video essay series One Hundred Movies Walk into a Bar organized by fellow video essayists Ariel Avissar and Colleen Laird.

== See also ==
- List of films voted the best
- BBC's 100 Greatest Films of the 21st Century (August 2016)
