= Fish Tank (film) =

2009 British film by Andrea Arnold

- Theatrical release poster
- Directed by: Andrea Arnold
- Written by: Andrea Arnold
- Produced by: Nick Laws; Kees Kasander
- Starring: Katie Jarvis; Michael Fassbender; Kierston Wareing; Rebecca Griffiths; Harry Treadaway; Sydney Mary Nash
- Cinematography: Robbie Ryan
- Edited by: Nicolas Chaudeurge
- Music by: Steel Pulse
- Production companies: BBC Films; UK Film Council; Kasander Film Company; Limelight; ContentFilm
- Distributed by: Curzon Artificial Eye (United Kingdom)
- Release dates: 14 May 2009 (Cannes); 11 September 2009 (United Kingdom)
- Running time: 123 minutes
- Country: United Kingdom
- Language: English
- Budget: $3 million
- Box office: $5.9 million

Fish Tank is a 2009 British coming of age drama film written and directed by Andrea Arnold. The film is about Mia, a volatile and socially isolated 15-year-old, and her relationship with her mother's new boyfriend. Fish Tank was critically acclaimed and won the Jury Prize at the 2009 Cannes Film Festival. It also won the 2010 BAFTA for Best British Film. It was ranked 65th on the BBC's 100 Greatest Films of the 21st Century list. It was also ranked 91st on The New York Times' list of the 100 Best Movies of the 21st Century.

The film was funded by BBC Films and the UK Film Council. It was theatrically released in the United Kingdom on 11 September 2009 by Curzon Film.

== Plot ==
Mia Williams, a volatile and socially isolated 15-year-old, lives on an East London council estate with her single mother, Joanne, and younger sister, Tyler. Mia has just fallen out with her best friend, Keely. She doesn't get along with her precocious sister, nor with her verbally abusive mother. Mia provokes Keely's other friends with physical aggression. Mia regularly practices hip-hop dance alone in a deserted flat in her family's building, drinking alcoholic cider beforehand.

Later, Mia comes across a tethered horse in a Traveller encampment. She tries to free it, only to be caught and chased by two young men, the horse's owners. Billy, the younger of the two, is less hostile to Mia.

Mia's mother Joanne's new boyfriend, Connor, is charming and handsome. He notices Mia's dance moves, and invites Mia and Tyler to come with him and Joanne on a day-trip to the countryside. He introduces them to his favourite song, Bobby Womack's version of "California Dreamin'", and shows Mia how to catch a fish using her bare hands. Although Mia is abrupt with Connor, she seeks his attention.

A social worker visits Joanne regarding Mia, offering a referral to a boarding unit for disengaged teens. Mia flees. At an internet café, Mia takes a poster stuck up in the window by a club that is clearly advertising for erotic dancers. Friends of Keely enter the internet cafe and argue with and attack Mia. Later, Mia visits Connor at work where he is a security guard. Connor encourages her to apply for the dancing audition, lending her a video camera to record an audition on. Their interactions become increasingly flirtatious.

Connor later administers a flirtatious spanking to Mia when she returns, and Mia becomes jealous and angry when she overhears Connor and her mother having sex. After that, Mia assists Billy in stealing a car engine part from a junkyard, appearing to flirt.

Mia is invited by the club to perform in person after sending in her tape. With Joanne passed out drunk upstairs, and after Mia and Connor have also been drinking, Connor asks to see Mia's dance routine. She dances to "California Dreamin'", and Connor initiates sex. Connor tells Mia to keep their liaison a secret. The following morning, Mia hears her mother crying as Connor has left. In her anger, Joanne tells Mia she planned to abort her whilst pregnant. Mia tracks Connor down to his middle-class home. He explains that he cannot see her anymore because of her age and drives her to a station. However, Mia returns to his house and sneaks in. She finds a video camera which reveals footage of Connor's partner and their young daughter, Keira. Mia angrily urinates on Connor's living room floor, and then sneaks out of the back door when the family return home.

Mia lingers by Connor's home and eventually leads Keira away from her family. Keira tries to escape Mia, who catches up with her and tells her to stop running. Keira starts angrily kicking Mia's legs, and when she doesn't stop, Mia pushes her into the River Thames. After realizing what she has done, she helps Keira get out and takes her home anonymously. Connor soon chases Mia down post Keira's return, chasing Mia across a field and forcefully slapping her.

Mia goes to her dance audition, soon realising its true nature. The other participants perform erotic auditions. Mia takes the stage, but as the music she had chosen ("California Dreamin'" from Connor's CD) starts, she dejectedly leaves the stage.

Mia heads to Billy's home, not finding the horse. Billy tells her that the horse had to be put down, to which Mia responds by breaking down in tears. Billy invites Mia to relocate with him to Cardiff. Mia returns home to pack for the trip, and, despite their coldness, joins Joanne and her sister in synchronised dancing to Nas' "Life's a Bitch". Mia and Billy depart for Wales after Mia is embraced by Tyler.

== Cast ==
- Katie Jarvis as Mia Williams
- Kierston Wareing as Joanne Williams
- Michael Fassbender as Connor O'Reily
- Rebecca Griffiths as Tyler Williams
- Harry Treadaway as Billy
- Sydney Mary Nash as Keira O'Reily
- Sarah Bayes as Keely

== Production ==
Katie Jarvis, who plays Mia, had no prior acting experience. She was cast for the film after one of Arnold's casting assistants saw her arguing with her boyfriend in Tilbury Town railway station, which is the station featured in the film.

Principal photography began 28 July 2008 over the course of six weeks, and was filmed in chronological order. Actors were unaware of their characters' trajectories through the film due to only being provided relevant sections of the script at a time.

Location filming took place on the now-partially demolished Mardyke Estate in Havering, in the town of Tilbury, and on the A13.

== Music ==
Music features prominently in the film. The song Mia uses at her audition is "California Dreamin'", as covered by Bobby Womack (1968). Characters in the film dance to the song "Me & U" by Cassie and the video for Down 4 U by Ja Rule and Ashanti is shown on screen. Other songs include "Jah Rule (w/ Paul St. Hilaire)" by Rhythm & Sound (Album: W/The Artists), "Life's a Bitch" by Nas, "Just to Get a Rep" by Gang Starr, "Cool Down the Pace" by Gregory Isaacs, "Your House" by Steel Pulse, "Juice" by Eric B and Rakim, "Baby girl" by Wiley, "Show Me Love" (Stonebridge Club Mix) by Robin S, "Get Up Offa That Thing" by James Brown, "In The Fading Light" by New Device, and "Original Nuttah" by Shy FX & UK Apache.

The film has no non-diegetic music; the entire soundtrack consists of songs and music played by characters within the narrative.

== Release ==
=== Distribution ===
The film had its world premiere at the Cannes Film Festival on 14 May 2009. Curzon Artificial Eye and IFC Films acquired United Kingdom and United States distribution rights to the film respectively. The film went onto screen at the Edinburgh International Film Festival, Karlovy Vary Film Festival, Telluride Film Festival, and the Toronto International Film Festival. The film was released in the United Kingdom on 11 September 2009. It was then released in the United States on 15 January 2010.

=== Home media ===
A new high-definition digital transfer of the film was released on DVD and Blu-ray by The Criterion Collection in February 2011. Extras include three short films by director Andrea Arnold: Milk (1998), Dog (2001), and the Oscar-winning Wasp (2003).

== Reception ==
=== Box office ===
Fish Tank was released domestically on 11 September 2009 taking £103,180 on its first weekend and a total of £332,488. As of 15 June 2010, the film earned $374,675 in the United States and $1,612,034 elsewhere, bringing the worldwide total to $1,986,709.

=== Critical response ===
Rotten Tomatoes reports that 91% of critics reviewed the film positively, based on a sample of 151 reviews, with an average rating of 7.9/10. The consensus states "Cannes Jury Prize-winner Fish Tank is gritty British realism at its very best, with flawless performances from newcomer Kate Jarvis, and Michael Fassbender." On Metacritic the film has a score of 81 out of 100 from 31 critic reviews, indicating “universal acclaim”. The New Yorker's David Denby writes, "Fish Tank may begin as a patch of lower-class chaos, but it turns into a commanding, emotionally satisfying movie, comparable to such youth-in-trouble classics as The 400 Blows". Sofia Coppola has named Fish Tank as one of her favourite films of all time. In 2025, it was ranked number 91 on The New York Times' list of the 100 Best Movies of the 21st Century.
