= Andrea Arnold =

English film director and actor (born 1961)

Andrea Arnold OBE
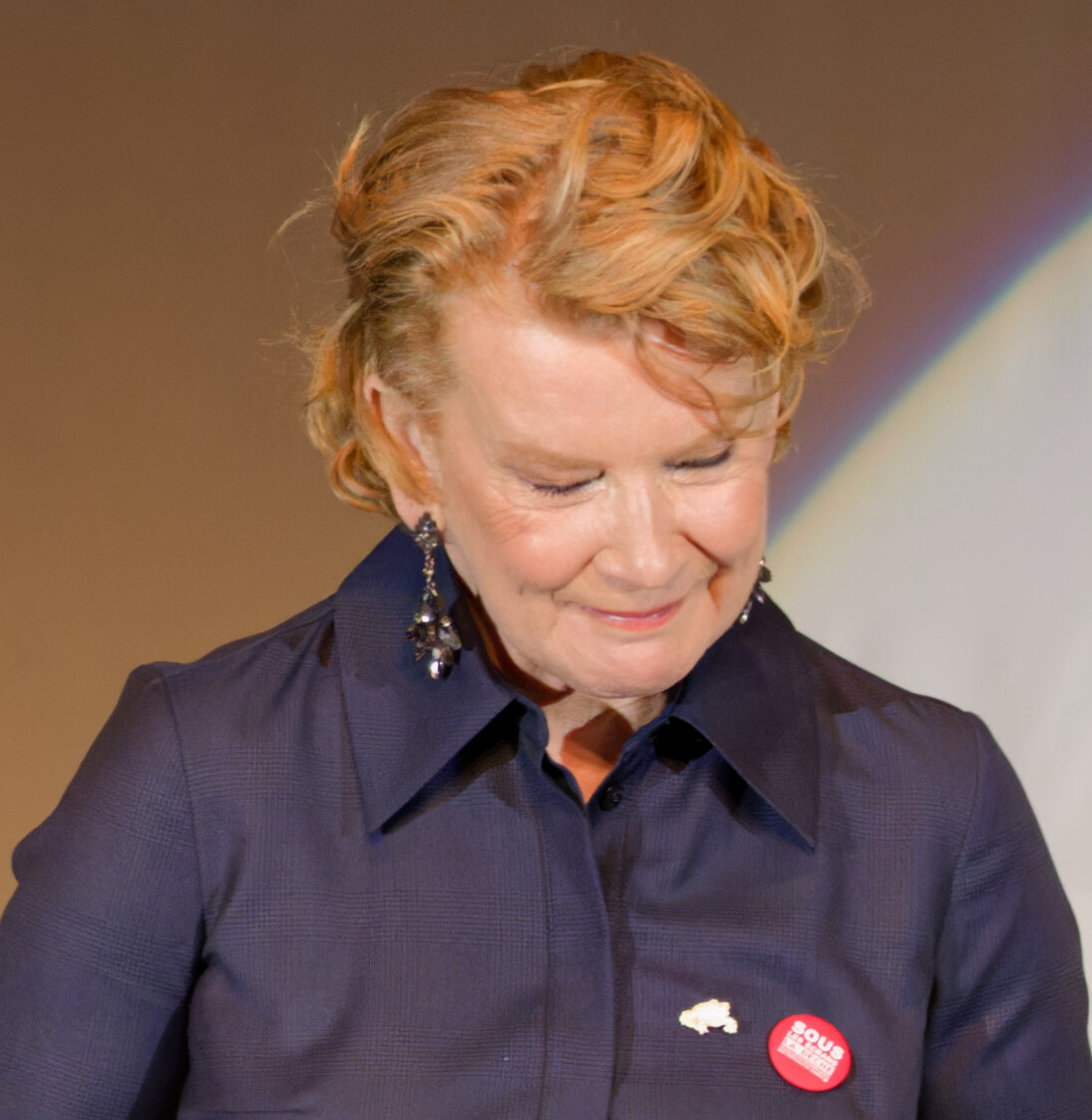
- Arnold at the 2024 Cannes Film Festival
- Born: Andrea Patricia Arnold; 5 April 1961 (age 65); Dartford, Kent, England
- Education: AFI Conservatory
- Occupation: Filmmaker
- Years active: 1982–present
- Children: 1
- Andrea Arnold's voice from the BBC programme The Film Programme, 15 January 2010

Andrea Patricia Arnold OBE (born 5 April 1961) is an English filmmaker and former actress. She won an Academy Award for her short film Wasp in 2005. Her feature films include Red Road (2006), Fish Tank (2009) and American Honey (2016), all of which have won the Jury Prize at the Cannes Film Festival, while her first documentary feature Cow premiered at the 2021 Cannes Film Festival.

Arnold's television work includes directing the second season of the HBO series Big Little Lies, and four episodes each of the Amazon Prime Video series Transparent and I Love Dick.

== Early life and education ==
Andrea Patricia Arnold was born on 5 April 1961 in Dartford, Kent, the eldest of four children. She was born when her mother was only 16 years old and her father was 17, and they separated when she was very young. Growing up on a council estate, she spent her youth days constantly exploring the "chalk pits, fields, woods and motorways" of Dartford. Her mother had to bring up all four children alone, which is reminiscent of the narrative in Arnold's third short film, Wasp.

As a young girl, she was writing dark stories about human experience. In an interview, Arnold speaks about how when she was 10 years old, she wrote her first play that expressed her "horror" of the slave trade, and a few years later while studying for a dance GCSE, she made a performance piece; "I took quotes from The Diary of Anne Frank and read them aloud as I moved around the room. All the other kids would just bung on some pop music and dance. I remember the examiners sitting there looking at me, perplexed." Arnold left school when she was 16, when she was drawn to becoming an actor. When Arnold was 18 years old she began working as a host and actor for a children's TV show called No. 73. She worked in TV for the next 10 years while continually writing on the side. Arnold realized she could turn her stories into films so she studied at the American Film Institute of Los Angeles, where she gained experience in the film industry. In explaining why she moved from London to study film in the U.S. she states, "I felt my lack of education and accent always held me back in the eyes of the gatekeepers".

After finishing her studies and returning to Britain she had her daughter, Coral, and began making short films for TV.

== Career ==
=== Early TV work ===
After leaving school in the late 1970s, Arnold got her first TV jobs as a dancer on shows that included Top of the Pops. She first came to prominence as an actor and television presenter alongside Sandi Toksvig, Nick Staverson and Neil Buchanan in the 1980s children's television show No. 73. This Saturday morning show on ITV, in which she played Dawn Lodge, was part sitcom, part chat show and based at a domestic residence. In addition to these parts, the show had the usual mix of music, competitions and cartoons that was in keeping to the formula of British Saturday morning children's TV of the 1980s. After a couple of years of experience in front of the camera, Arnold realized, "Television was great fun and I went along for the ride, but I never felt that comfortable in front of the camera".

In 1988 No. 73 had morphed into 7T3, with the set being moved from the Maidstone house (in fact in TVS studios in Kent) to that of a theme park. This revamp would only last the season, but Arnold would be seen for another two years in the same timeslot as part of the Motormouth presenting team. In 1990 she presented and wrote for the environmental awareness show for teens, A Beetle Called Derek. This also featured Benjamin Zephaniah and gave exposure to The Yes/No People of Stomp fame.

=== Directing ===
After retiring from her career as a television presenter, Arnold studied directing at the AFI Conservatory in Los Angeles and trained in screenwriting at the PAL Labs in Kent. Her early short films included Milk (1998), which premiered at the International Critics' Week Cannes, and Dog (2001). She won the Academy Award for Best Live Action Short Film for Wasp, in 2004.

She was named a Screen International Star of Tomorrow. Also in 2003, she directed an episode of the Channel 4 series Coming Up titled "Bed Bugs", though she is sometimes erroneously credited as "Andrew Arnold" for the work.

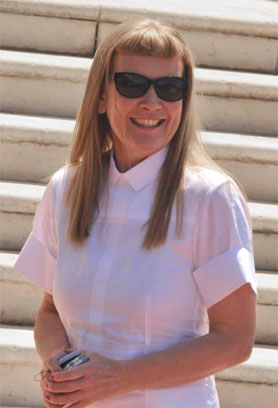
Arnold at the 2012 Cannes Film Festival

Red Road is the first installment of Advance Party, a planned set of three conceptually-related films by different first-time directors. Set on a housing estate in Glasgow, the revenge-themed story centres on a CCTV (security TV cameras) operator who develops an obsession with someone she observes, for reasons that become clear through the progress of the film. The picture has won the British director comparisons with established names such as Michael Haneke and Lars von Trier. Screen International critic Allan Hunter said the film was "likely to emerge as one of the discoveries of this year's Cannes Film Festival (2006)." It went on to win the Jury Prize at Cannes that year.

She won the 2007 BAFTA Award for Outstanding Debut by a British Writer, Director or Producer for directing Red Road. In 2008, Arnold was reported to be directing an adaptation of Gillian Flynn's novel Sharp Objects for French production company Pathé, but the project never materialized. In 2011, she was reported to be working on a television project with writer Danny Brocklehurst called Dirty, but this project also failed to materialize.

Her 2009 film Fish Tank premiered at the 62nd Cannes Film Festival, where she once again won the Jury Prize. The film also went on to win the BAFTA Award for Outstanding British Film in 2010. In 2011, she completed shooting an adaptation of Emily Brontë's Wuthering Heights, produced by London's Ecosse Films. The film was shown in competition at the 68th Venice International Film Festival in September where it won the Golden Osella for Best Cinematography.

She was appointed Officer of the Order of the British Empire (OBE) in the 2011 New Year Honours for services to the film industry.

In 2015, it was announced that she would direct two episodes of the Amazon Prime Video series Transparent.

==== Wasp ====
Initially released in 2003, Wasp was a short (26 minutes) written and directed by Arnold. It stars Natalie Press as a struggling single mother determined not to let her four young children prove an obstacle in the pursuit of igniting a relationship with an old friend (Danny Dyer). Arnold's native Dartford is the setting. The film was commissioned by the UK Film Council and the Britain's Channel 4. It won the Sundance Short Film Prize in 2005, and won Arnold an Oscar for Best Live Action Short Film.

==== Red Road ====
Red Road was a 2006 film that is a part of a creative series proposed by the Advance Party of Filmmakers to create three films using the same characters, all directed by different new directors. It tells the story of a CCTV security operator who observes through her monitors a man from her past. It is named after, and partly set at, the Red Road flats in Barmulloch, Glasgow, Scotland which were the tallest residential buildings in Europe at the time they were built. It is shot largely in a Dogme 95 style, using handheld cameras and natural light.

One rule was that if any of the directors decide to incorporate a new main character, then all of the other films must incorporate that character as well. All three directors cast together so they could all see who they believed would fit their film as well as the others. Arnold mainly used first-time actors, stating that "I always want the world that I create to be its own universe. When you have really famous people, I find that it is very hard to transcend that awareness. I am always aware of who they are. When you see someone for the first time, that universe feels even more real. I like the idea of working with either unknowns or people that haven't even acted before." Red Road cost $1 million to make and was shot digitally on a schedule of six weeks. The film was accepted into competition for the Palme d'Or in Cannes and received the Jury Prize.

==== Fish Tank ====
Fish Tank premiered in 2009 and was accepted into competition for the Palme d'Or at the Cannes Film Festival and received the Jury Prize. In its initial production, distributor Artificial Eye had acquired the UK theatrical rights, while ContentFilm International handled the worldwide sales. The film was backed by the Limelight Fund, BBC Films and the UK Film Council's New Cinema Fund. The film was shot entirely on location in the UK. Arnold was adamant about shooting the film in chronological order, so that the journey of the film would make sense to new coming actor Katie Jarvis. She would only give her a day's worth of script to study so that she could take it day by day. The film originally premiered on around 45–50 screens in Britain, making them less accessible to the general public. In regards to this, Arnold said, "I definitely feel sorry more people don't get to see my films. They aren't inaccessible, and if people got the chance to see them, I know they'd like them. I wish cinema [owners] could be braver, or had more money to help them show films like mine." The film cost around $2 million to make, which is still a relatively low budget for a feature-length film. Fish Tank won many awards including the best film award at the Evening Standard Film Awards. Fish Tank was released on 11 September 2009. The film and Arnold were honoured at the 20th Annual Women in Film and TV Awards in 2010.

==== Wuthering Heights ====
Arnold's third film was based on Emily Brontë's 1847 novel and starred Kaya Scodelario and James Howson. This is the first film that Arnold has directed which she did not write herself, though she did co-write the screenplay. Originally, the film adaptation was set to be directed by Peter Webber, who directed Girl with a Pearl Earring, but Arnold was asked to take over and gladly accepted. The film was made in 18 months, which is half the amount of time Arnold used to make Red Road and Fish Tank. Oscilloscope Laboratories picked up the North American distribution rights to the adaptation, which won Best Cinematography at the Venice Film Festival in 2011, being praised for its visuals.

==== American Honey ====
External audio
- Filmmaker Andrea Arnold On 'American Honey' And Preserving Mystery In Film, 20:42, 29 September 2016, Fresh Air with Terry Gross

Arnold's fourth film, American Honey, revolves around a group of young adults traveling across the country selling magazine subscriptions. The meandering plot focuses on the journey of the mag-crew kids as they drink, smoke, dance, joke around, and have various conversations in their van. The film had its world premiere and competed for Palme d'Or at the 2016 Cannes Film Festival. It won Arnold her third Jury Prize. The film features a mix of both professional and non-actors, with all the non-actors being found through construction sites, parking lots, and on beaches. Out of the 15 youth actors cast, 11 had never acted before. The lead Sasha Lane was spotted by Arnold on a beach during spring break. Arnold shot the film in chronological sequence, not telling her actors where they were going next. The film was released in the United States on 30 September 2016, and in the United Kingdom on 14 October 2016, by A24 and Focus Features respectively.

==== Cow ====
Arnold's 2021 documentary Cow is a portrait of a dairy-farm cow's life span.

==== Bird ====
In June 2023 Arnold began filming her new project Bird in Kent, with Barry Keoghan in a leading role.

== Other activities ==
Arnold has been very active in working with film festivals around the world. She has been described as a "film festival regular even between films". In 2012 she was a member of the Jury for the Main Competition at the 2012 Cannes Film Festival. In 2013 she was named as a member of the jury at the 70th Venice International Film Festival.

In September 2013, Arnold was named the New York Film Festival's inaugural Filmmaker in Residence. As the first Filmmaker in Residence, Arnold was responsible for "creating a template for the programme". Through the programme, Arnold was given the "opportunity to focus on developing or refining new work, and participate in master classes, mentorships or cultural exchange and enrichment film programmes with the Film Society of Lincoln Center members, the film community and the public".

In 2014 Arnold was announced as the chair of the jury for International Critics' Week at the 2014 Cannes Film Festival. In 2016, Arnold was chosen to take part in a public conversation about her career as part of the Tribeca Film Festival's "Tribeca Talks" programme. Arnold was a jury member of the 2017 Sheffield Doc/Fest.

Arnold was named as chair of the Les Arcs Film Festival, which ran from 16 to 23 December 2017.

== Styles and themes ==
In general, Arnold's films are characterised by the themes of deprivation and impoverishment; for example, both Fish Tank and Wuthering Heights are dramas featuring teenagers living in the poverty-stricken English edge-lands. American film critic Roger Ebert compared her filmmaking style to that of Ken Loach. English film critic Mark Kermode compared her style to that of Lynne Ramsay, Clio Barnard, and Ingmar Bergman.

== Personal life ==
As of October 2016, Arnold was living in Greenwich, London, with her daughter.

In 2012, Arnold embarked on an impulsive road-trip of the continental United States, which she states partially inspired the premise of her 2016 feature American Honey.

== Filmography ==
Short film

Year	Title	Director	Writer
1998	Milk	Yes	Yes
2001	Dog	Yes	Yes
2003	Wasp	Yes	Yes

=== Feature film ===
Year	Title	Director	Writer
2006	Red Road	Yes	Yes
2009	Fish Tank	Yes	Yes
2011	Wuthering Heights	Yes	Yes
2016	American Honey	Yes	Yes
2024	Bird	Yes	Yes

Documentary

- Cow (2021)

=== Television ===
Year	Title	Notes
2003	Coming Up	Episode "Bed Bugs"
2015–2017	Transparent	4 episodes
2017	I Love Dick	4 episodes
2019	Big Little Lies	7 episodes

== Awards and nominations ==
Organizations	Year	Category	Work	Result	Ref.
Academy Awards	2004	Best Live Action Short Film	Wasp	Won	
BAFTA Awards	2006	Outstanding Debut by a British Writer, Director or Producer	Red Road	Won	
BAFTA Awards	2009	Outstanding British Film of the Year	Fish Tank	Won	
BAFTA Awards	2016	Outstanding British Film of the Year	American Honey	Nominated	
BAFTA Awards	2021	Best Documentary	Cow	Nominated	
BAFTA Awards	2024	Outstanding British Film of the Year	Bird	Nominated	
British Independent Film Awards	2006	Douglas Hickox award	Red Road	Nominated	
British Independent Film Awards	2009	Best Director	Fish Tank	Won	
British Independent Film Awards	2009	Best Screenplay	Fish Tank	Nominated	
British Independent Film Awards	2016	Best Director	American Honey	Won	
British Independent Film Awards	2016	Best Screenplay	American Honey	Nominated	
British Independent Film Awards	2021	Best Documentary	Cow	Nominated	
British Independent Film Awards	2024	Best Director	Bird	Nominated	
Cannes Film Festival	2006	Palme d'Or	Red Road	Nominated	
Cannes Film Festival	2006	Jury Prize	Red Road	Won	
Cannes Film Festival	2009	Palme d'Or	Fish Tank	Nominated	
Cannes Film Festival	2009	Jury Prize	Fish Tank	Won	
Cannes Film Festival	2016	Palme d'Or	American Honey	Nominated	
Cannes Film Festival	2016	Jury Prize	American Honey	Won	
Cannes Film Festival	2016	Prize of the Ecumenical Jury	American Honey	Special Mention	
Cannes Film Festival	2021	Golden Eye	Cow	Nominated	
Cannes Film Festival	2024	Palme d'Or	Bird	Nominated	
Cannes Film Festival	2024	Jury Prize	Bird	Nominated	
Sundance Film Festival	2005	Short Filmmaking Award	Wasp	Won	
Venice Film Festival	2011	Golden Lion	Wuthering Heights	Nominated	

== Honorary awards ==
Organizations	Year	Notes	Result	Ref.
Queen Elizabeth II	2011	Officer of the Order of the British Empire	Honored	
New York Film Festival	2013	Filmmaker in Residence	Honored	
University of Sussex	2015	Honorary Doctorate of Letters	Honored	
Falmouth University	2015	Masterclass Lecturer	Honored	

== Reception ==
Year	Film	Rotten Tomatoes	Metacritic
2006	Red Road	87% (90 reviews)	73% (19 reviews)
2009	Fish Tank	91% (152 reviews)	81% (31 reviews)
2011	Wuthering Heights	68% (114 reviews)	70% (24 reviews)
2016	American Honey	79% (214 reviews)	80% (42 reviews)
2024	Bird	86% (132 reviews)	74% (36 reviews)

== See also ==
- List of British film directors
- List of British Academy Award nominees and winners
- List of film and television directors
- List of female film and television directors
- Women's cinema
