= Duncan Jones =

British director, producer, screenwriter (born 1971)

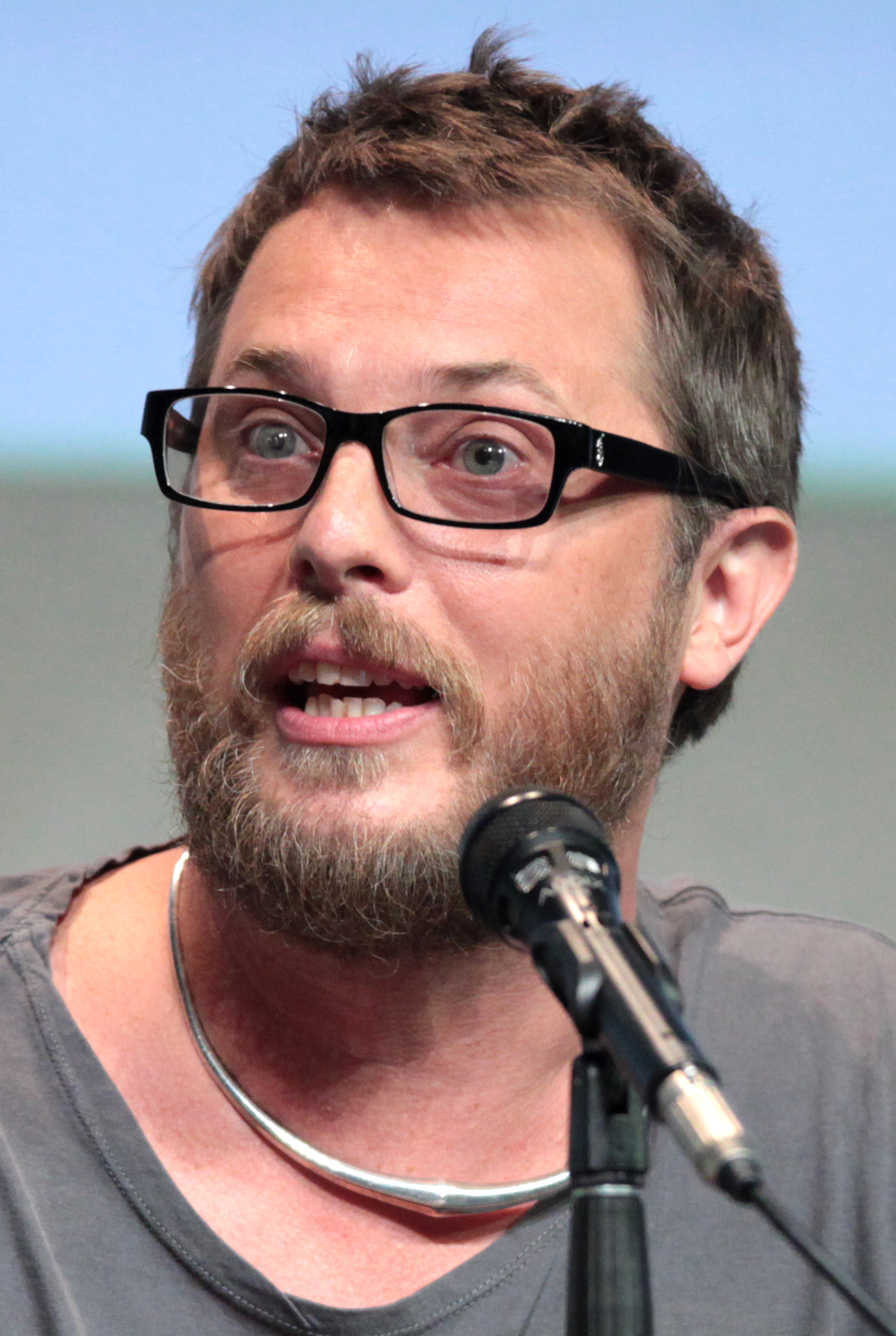
- Jones in 2015
- Born: Duncan Zowie Haywood Jones; 30 May 1971 (age 55); Bromley, London, England
- Education: College of Wooster; London Film School
- Occupations: Director; producer; screenwriter
- Years active: 2002–present
- Notable work: Moon; Source Code; Warcraft
- Spouse: Rodene Ronquillo (m. 2012)
- Children: 2
- Parents: David Bowie (father); Angie Bowie (mother)
- Relatives: Lexi Jones (half-sister)

Duncan Zowie Haywood Jones (born 30 May 1971) is a British film director, film producer and screenwriter. He directed the films Moon (2009), Source Code (2011), Warcraft (2016), and Mute (2018). For Moon, he won the BAFTA Award for Outstanding Debut by a British Writer, Director or Producer. He is the son of English singer-songwriter David Bowie and Cypriot-born American model, actress, and journalist Angie Bowie.

== Early life ==
Jones was born at Bromley Hospital in Bromley, London, on 30 May 1971, the first child of English singer-songwriter and musician David Bowie (1947–2016) and his first wife, Angela "Angie" Bowie (née Barnett), an American model and actress. His maternal grandfather, George, was a United States Army veteran and mining engineer who ran a mill for the Cyprus Mines Corporation, while his maternal grandmother, Helena, was a naturalised Canadian. His mother was born and raised in Cyprus, and has Polish ancestry. His birth prompted his father to write "Kooks" for his 1971 album Hunky Dory.

Mostly raised by his father David and his Scottish nanny, Marion Skene, Jones spent time growing up in London, Berlin, and Vevey in Switzerland. He attended the first and second grade at the Commonwealth-American School in Lausanne. When his parents divorced in February 1980, his father was granted custody of eight-year-old Jones (who was then known as "Zowie Bowie" to rhyme with his father's stage name) and he visited his mother on school holidays until ending contact with her at age 13. At age 14, he enrolled in the Scottish co-educational boarding school Gordonstoun. At the age of 12, he decided that he preferred to be called "Joey", and used this nickname until shortening it to "Joe" in his later teen years. The press reported that he went by "Joe" in 1992 when attending his father's wedding to fashion model Iman, where he was the best man. He reverted to his birth name around the age of 18.

Jones has two half-sisters, Stacia Lipka (born 1980) from his mother's relationship with musician Andrew Lipka (better known as Drew Blood) and Alexandria "Lexi" Jones (born 2000) from his father's marriage to Iman. He also has a stepsister, Zulekha Haywood (born 1978), who is the daughter of Iman and her second husband, former NBA basketball player Spencer Haywood.

By 1995, Jones graduated with a bachelor's degree in philosophy from the College of Wooster. He then pursued a PhD degree at Vanderbilt University in Tennessee, but left before completion to attend London Film School, where he then graduated in 2001.

== Career ==
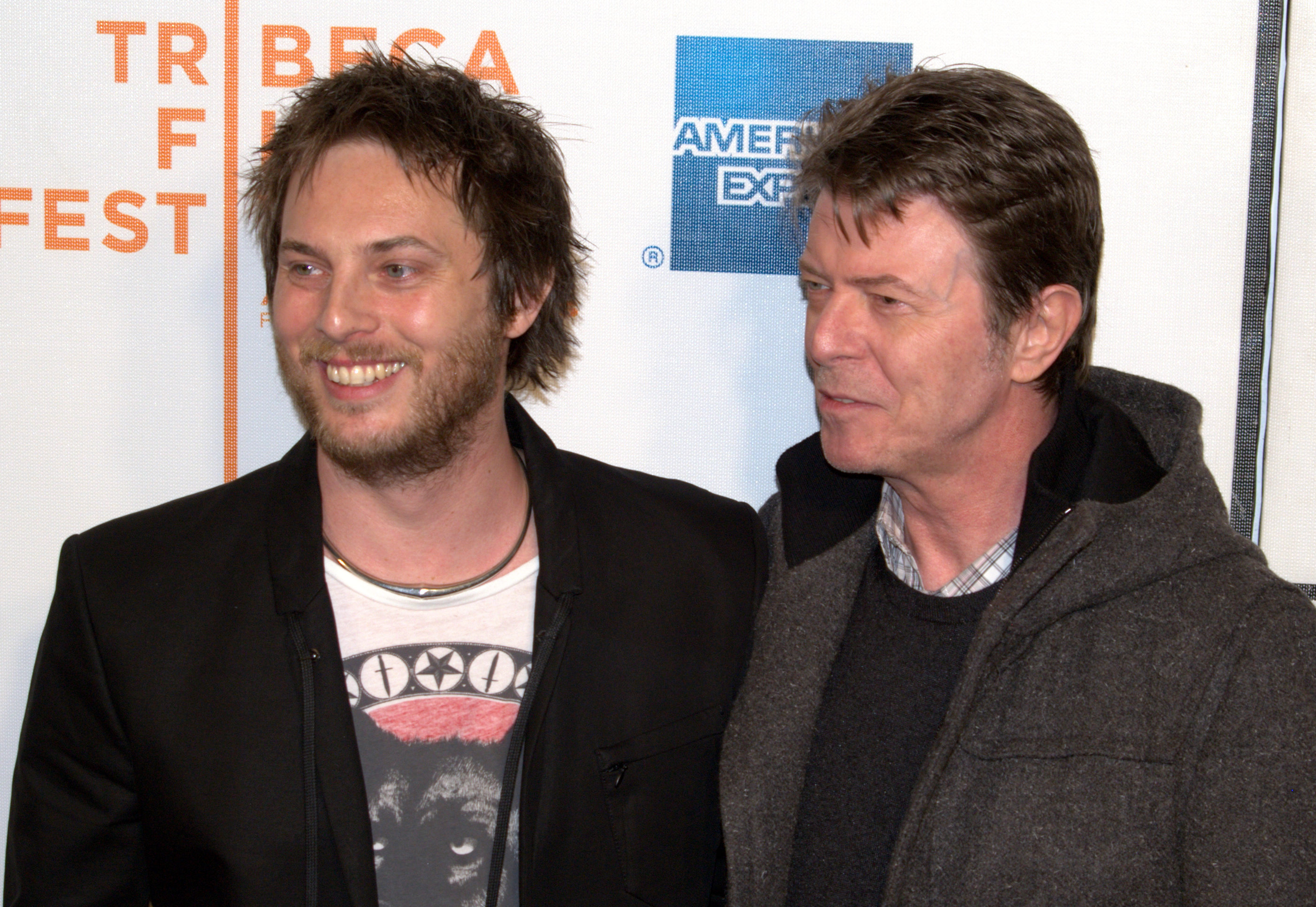
Jones with his father at the premiere of Moon in 2009

Jones visited the film set of Labyrinth while his father was filming, and worked for the Jim Henson Creature Shop afterwards.

Jones was one of many cameramen at his father's widely televised 50th birthday party directed by Englishman Tim Pope at Madison Square Garden in 1997 and also at two BowieNet concerts at Roseland Ballroom in New York City in June 2000. He was also the in-game cinematics director for the political simulator Republic: The Revolution, as well as scripting elements of the game.

Jones directed the 2006 campaign for the French Connection fashion label. The concept of 'Fashion vs Style' was to re-invigorate the brand and move it away from the former incarnation of FCUK, which style commentators believed had become tired and overused. The advert debuted in the week ending 20 February 2006 and featured two women (representing fashion and style) fighting and briefly kissing each other. The advertisement generated 127 complaints to the Advertising Standards Authority.

Jones's first feature film, Moon, was nominated for seven British Independent Film Awards in 2009, and won two, Best British Independent Film, and the Douglas Hickox Award for Best British Director on their debut feature. It was also nominated for two BAFTA Awards at the 2010 ceremony, winning Jones the BAFTA Award for Outstanding Debut by a British Writer, Director or Producer. The film has received 19 other nominations from film festivals and societies.

He directed the Summit Entertainment project Source Code, a science-fiction thriller from Vendome Pictures, which was produced by Mark Gordon. Source Code was released on DVD and Blu-ray on 26 July 2011 in the United States.

Jones directed and co-wrote Warcraft, based on the video game series of the same name, which was released in the summer of 2016. His next film would return to the science fiction genre and be called Mute, starring Alexander Skarsgård and Paul Rudd. Jones had been developing the project for years and described it as a "spiritual sequel" to Moon, and was inspired by Ridley Scott's Blade Runner. The film, set in Berlin forty years in the future, follows a mute bartender investigating his lover's disappearance. The film was produced and released by Netflix, and became available to stream world-wide in February 2018.

Through his social media, Jones announced in July 2018 that his next project would be a science fiction film, based on the 2000 AD Comics character Rogue Trooper. In July 2019 he told Entertainment Weekly, "The script is really looking pretty good now. It's getting to the point where we're going to have to start casting and making the thing." The animated film, made using Unreal Engine, premiered at the Annecy International Animation Film Festival on 22 June 2026. It made its North American premiere at the 2026 Toronto International Film Festival.

== Personal life ==
Jones became engaged to photographer Rodene Ronquillo on 28 June 2012. They married on 6 November 2012. On the same day, Ronquillo was diagnosed with breast cancer. The couple have campaigned for the awareness for the disease and for early diagnosis. On 10 July 2016, Ronquillo gave birth to their first child, a son. Their second child, a daughter was born on 18 April 2018.

== Filmography ==
Short film

Year	Title	Director	Writer	Co-producer
2002	Whistle	Yes	Yes	Yes

Feature film

Year	Title	Director	Writer	Producer
2009	Moon	Yes	Story	No
2011	Source Code	Yes	No	No
2016	Warcraft	Yes	Yes	No
2018	Mute	Yes	Yes	No
2026	Rogue Trooper	Yes	Yes	Yes

== Bibliography ==
Year	Title	Notes
2020	Madi: Once Upon A Time in The Future	Graphic novel Co-written with Alex De Campi

== Awards and nominations ==
Year	Title	Award/Nomination
2009	Moon	BAFTA Award for Outstanding Debut by a British Writer, Director or Producer; BIFA Douglas Hickox Award; Grand Prize of European Fantasy Film in Gold; Fantastic'Arts Jury Prize; Fantastic'Arts Special Prize; Hugo Award for Best Dramatic Presentation – Long Form; London Film Critics Circle Award for Breakthrough British Filmmaker; NBR Award for Best Directorial Debut; Writers' Guild of Great Britain Award for Best First Feature-Length Film Screenplay; Nominated—British Independent Film Award for Best Director; Nominated—Chicago Film Critics Association Award for Most Promising Filmmaker; Nominated—Evening Standard British Film Award for Most Promising Newcomer; Nominated—London Film Critics Circle Award for Best British Director
2011	Source Code	Nominated—Hugo Award for Best Dramatic Presentation; Nominated—Ray Bradbury Award
