= 63rd British Academy Film Awards =

2010 film award ceremony

- Date: 21 February 2010
- Site: Royal Opera House, London
- Hosted by: Jonathan Ross

Highlights
- Best Film: The Hurt Locker
- Best British Film: Fish Tank
- Best Actor: Colin Firth; A Single Man
- Best Actress: Carey Mulligan; An Education
- Most awards: The Hurt Locker (6)
- Most nominations: Avatar, An Education and The Hurt Locker (8)

The 63rd British Academy Film Awards, more commonly known as the BAFTAs, were held on 21 February 2010 at the Royal Albert Hall in London, honouring the best national and foreign films of 2009. Presented by the British Academy of Film and Television Arts, accolades were handed out for the best feature-length film and documentaries of any nationality that were screened at British cinemas in 2009.

The nominees were announced on 21 January 2010. Three films received the most nominations in eight categories; Avatar, An Education and The Hurt Locker. District 9 followed with seven. The Hurt Locker took home the most awards with six. This year marked the first year of the new Academy President, William, Prince of Wales, who presented the BAFTA Fellowship award to Vanessa Redgrave, alongside Uma Thurman.

Jonathan Ross hosted the ceremony for the fourth consecutive year.

== Winners and nominees ==
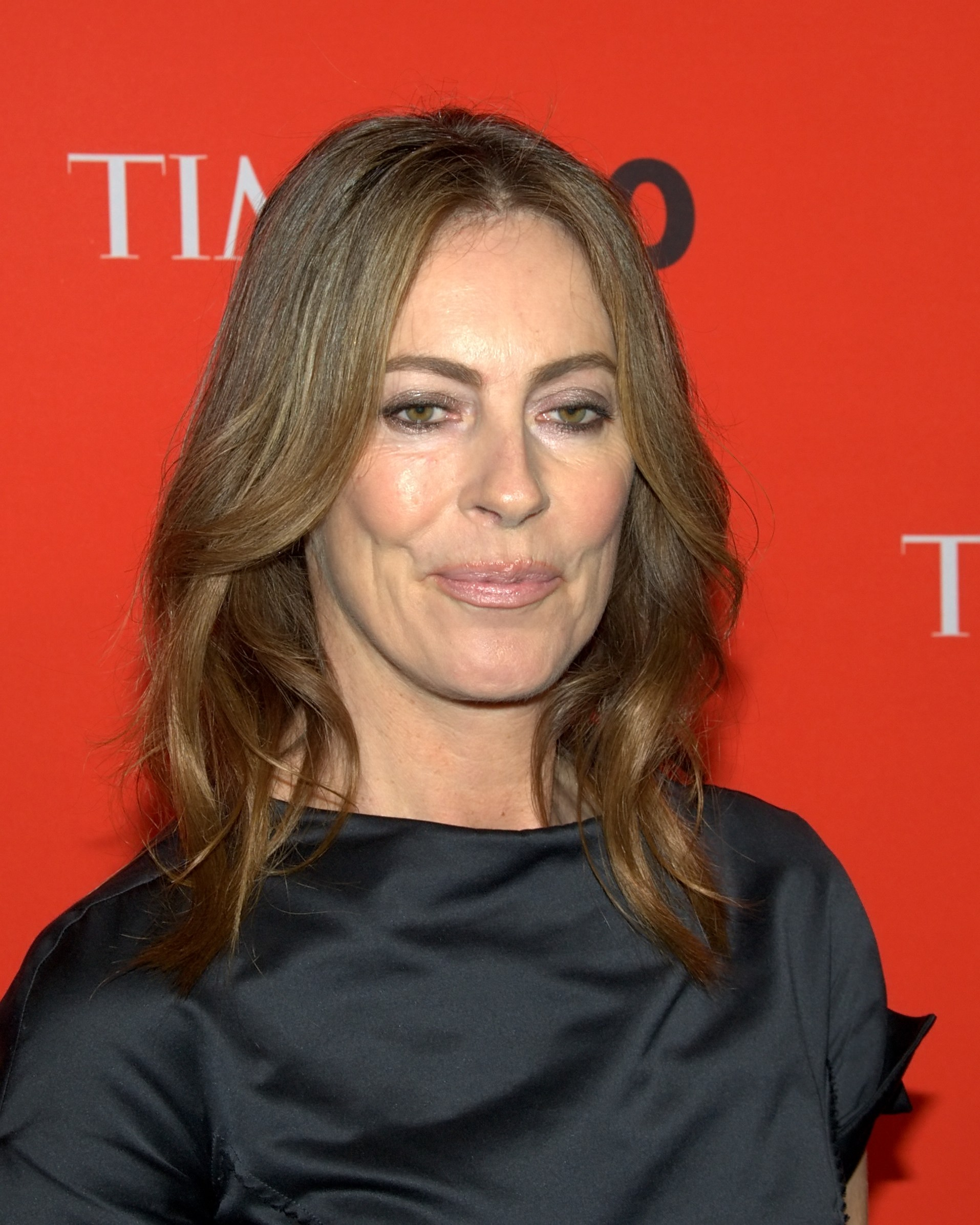
Kathryn Bigelow, Best Director winner

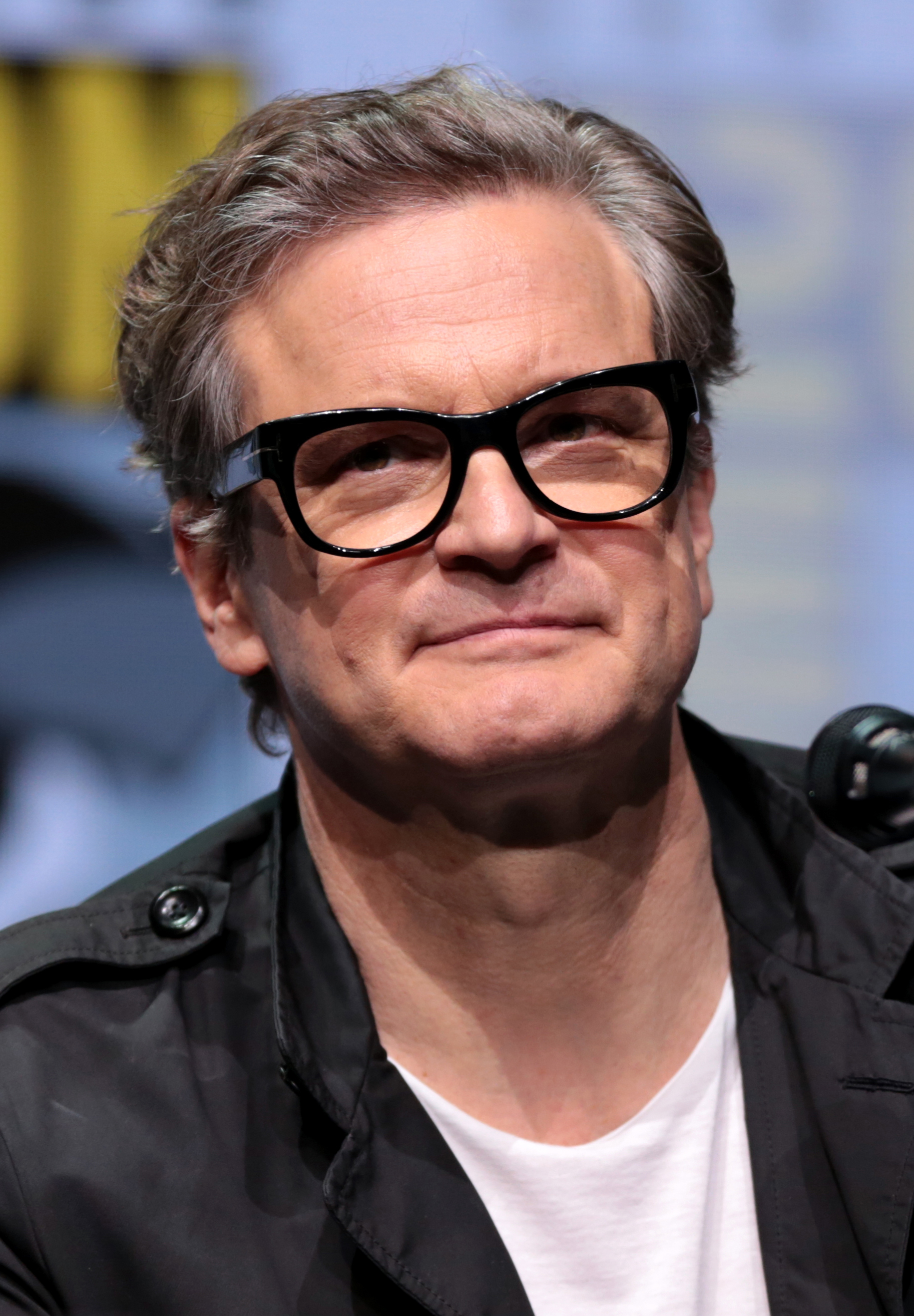
Colin Firth, Best Actor winner

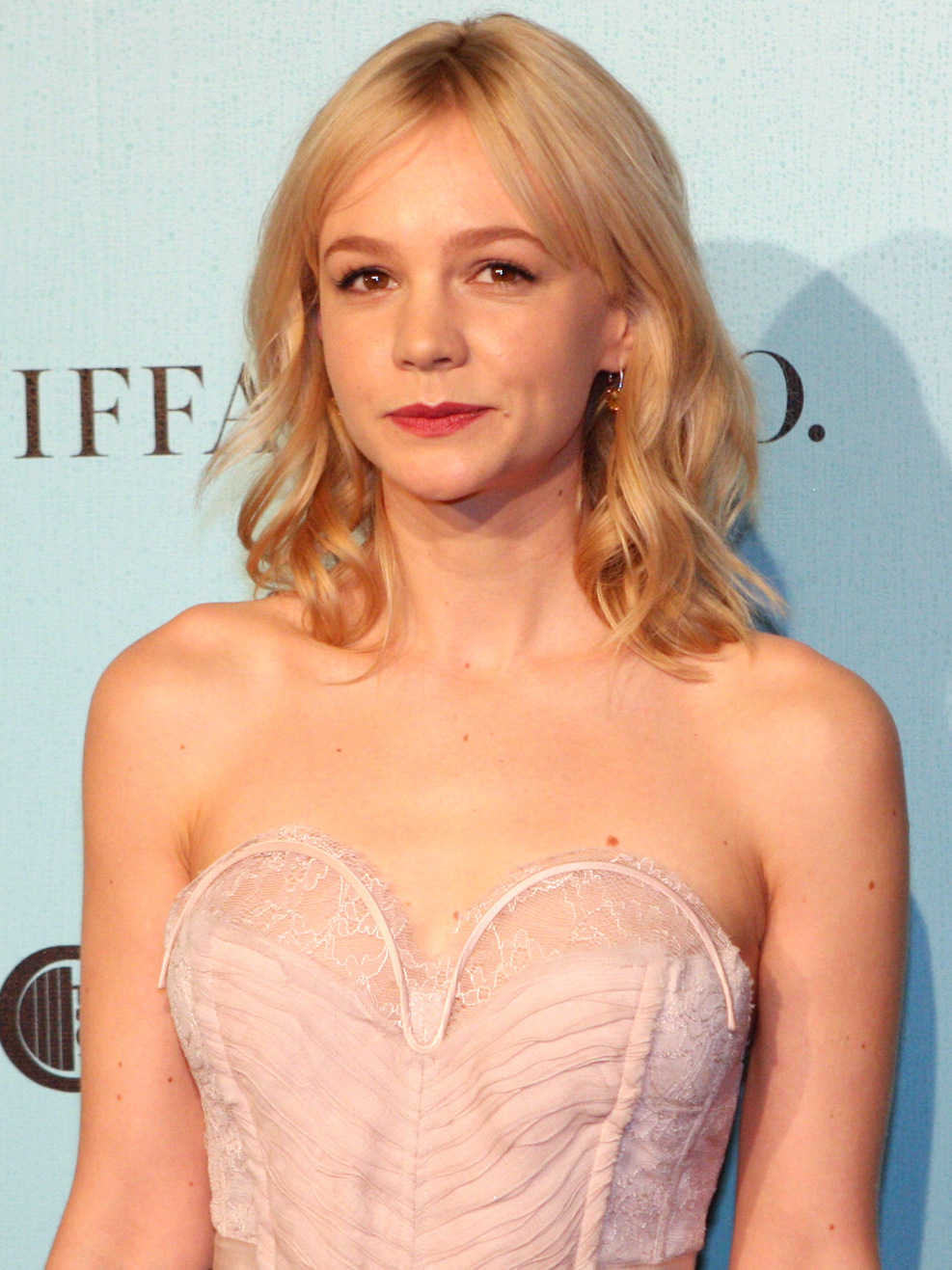
Carey Mulligan, Best Actress winner

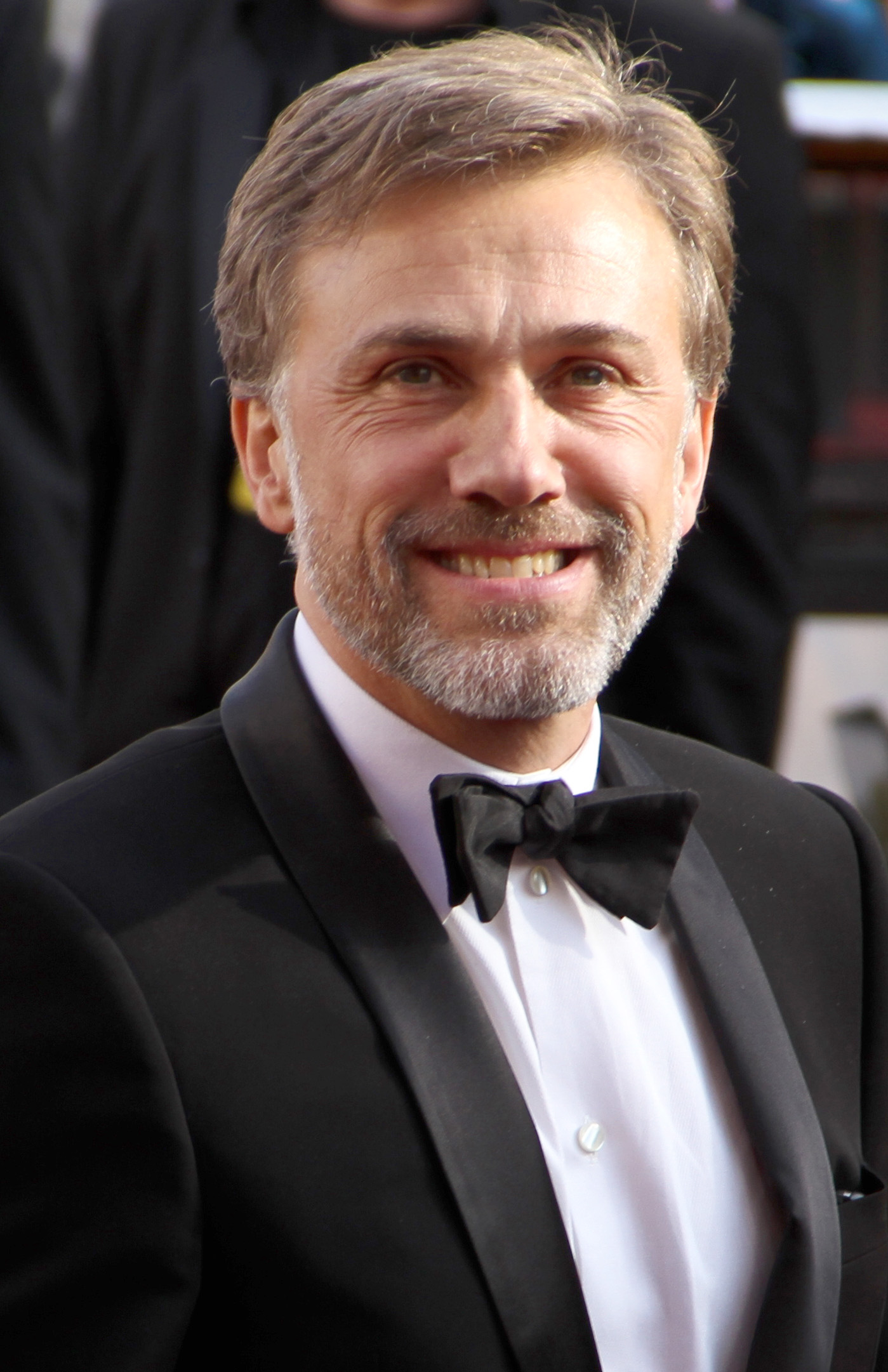
Christoph Waltz, Best Supporting Actor winner

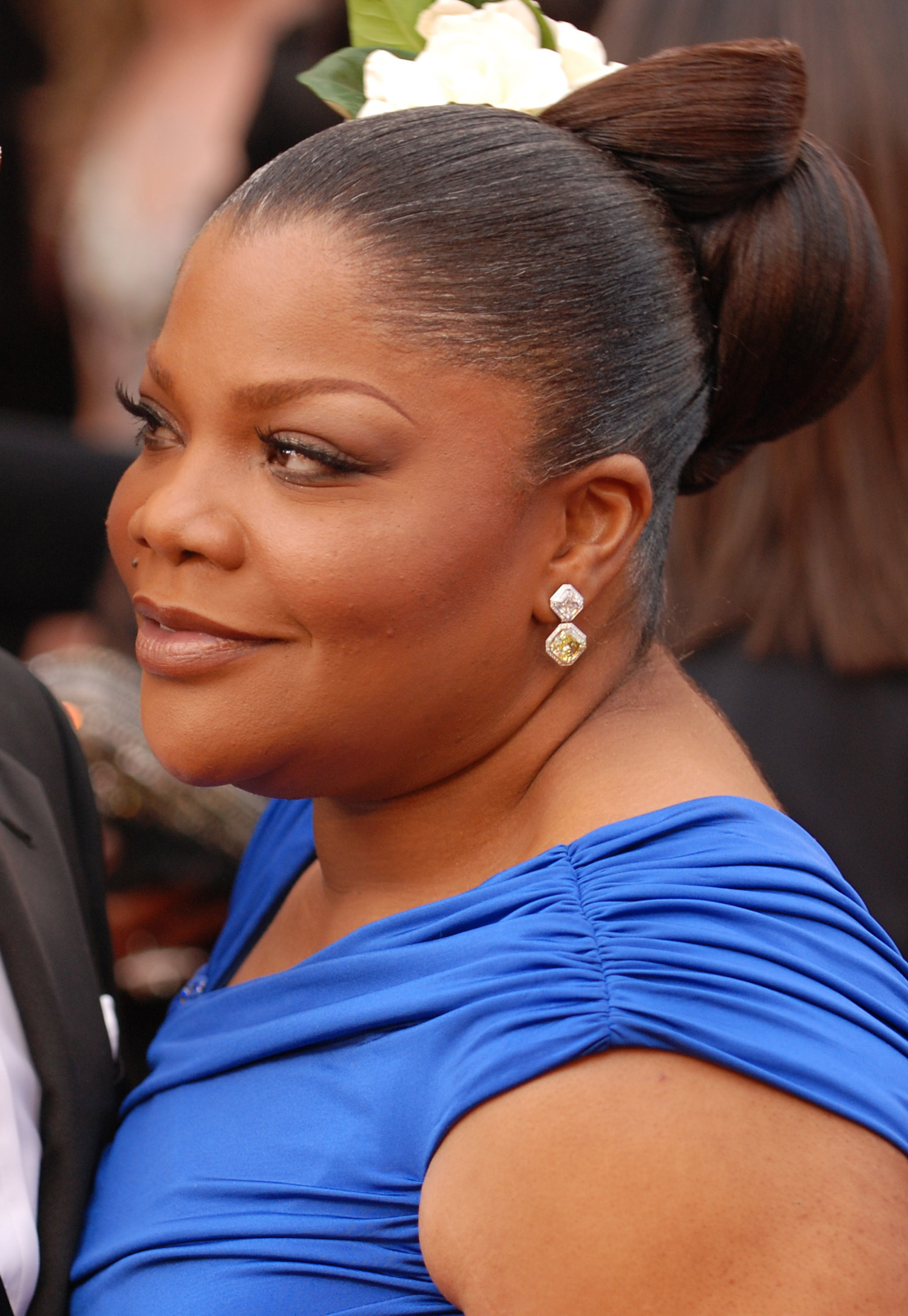
Mo'Nique, Best Supporting Actress winner

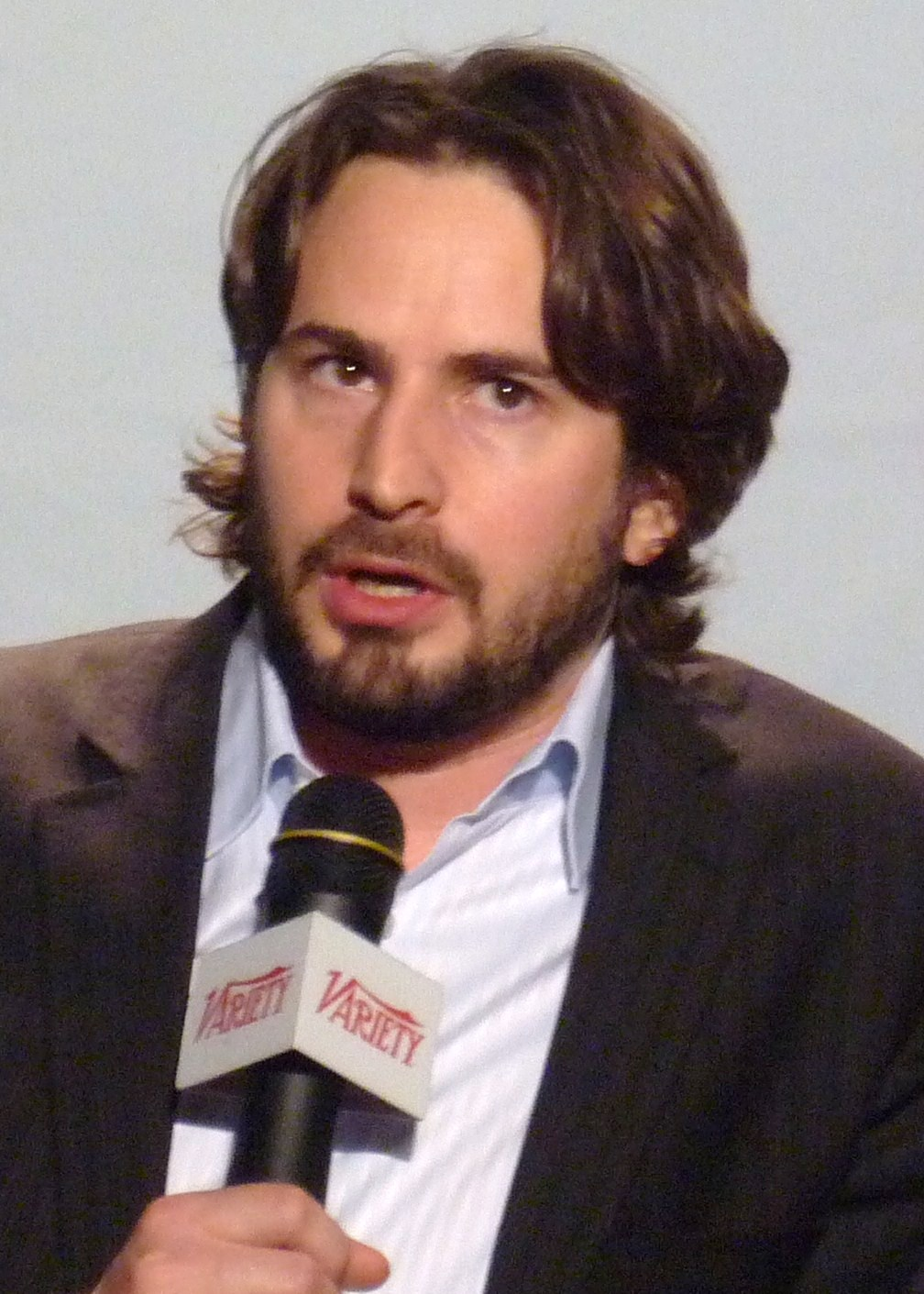
Mark Boal, Best Original Screenplay winner

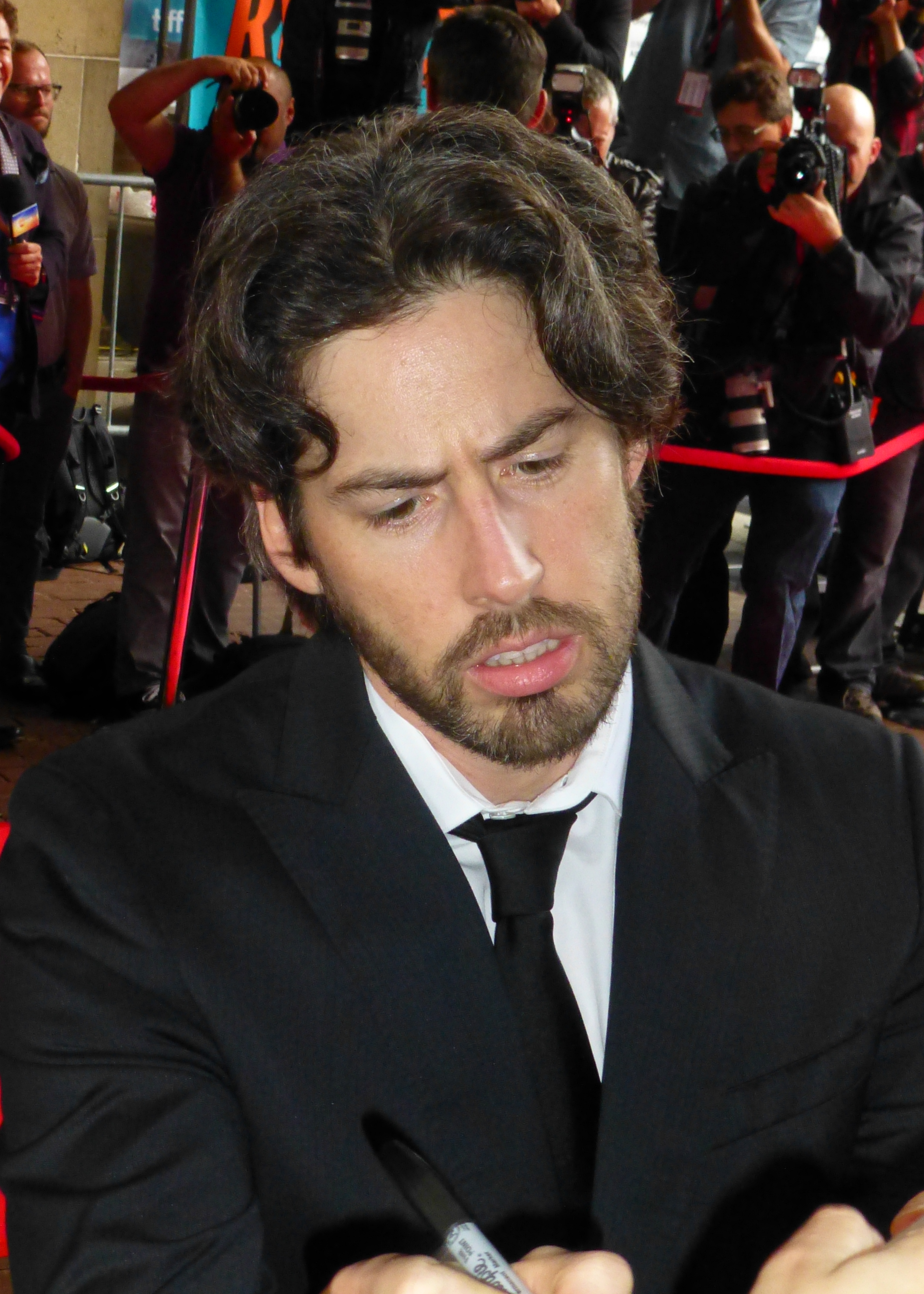
Jason Reitman, Best Adapted Screenplay co-winner

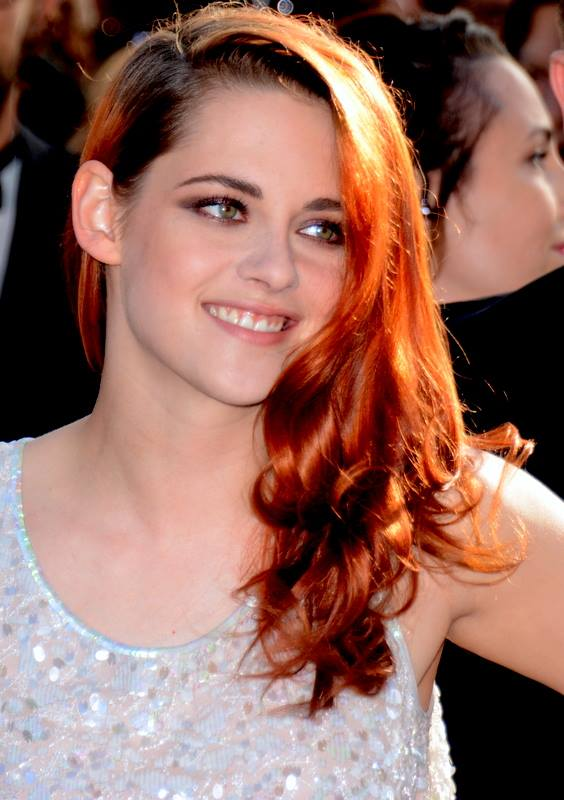
Kristen Stewart, Orange Rising Star Award winner

=== BAFTA Fellowship ===
- **Vanessa Redgrave**

=== Outstanding British Contribution to Cinema ===
- **Joe Dunton**

=== Awards ===
Winners are listed first and highlighted in boldface.

**Best Film**: **The Hurt Locker – Kathryn Bigelow, Mark Boal, Nicolas Chartier and Greg Shapiro**; Avatar – James Cameron and Jon Landau; An Education – Finola Dwyer and Amanda Posey; Precious – Lee Daniels, Sarah Siegel-Magness and Gary Magness; Up in the Air – Ivan Reitman, Jason Reitman and Daniel Dubiecki	**Best Direction**: **Kathryn Bigelow – The Hurt Locker**; Neill Blomkamp – District 9; James Cameron – Avatar; Lone Scherfig – An Education; Quentin Tarantino – Inglourious Basterds
**Best Actor in a Leading Role**: **Colin Firth – A Single Man as George Falconer**; Jeff Bridges – Crazy Heart as Otis Blake; George Clooney – Up in the Air as Ryan Bingham; Jeremy Renner – The Hurt Locker as Sergeant First Class William James; Andy Serkis – Sex & Drugs & Rock & Roll as Ian Dury	**Best Actress in a Leading Role**: **Carey Mulligan – An Education as Jenny Mellor**; Saoirse Ronan – The Lovely Bones as Susie Salmon; Gabourey Sidibe – Precious as Claireece Precious Jones; Meryl Streep – Julie & Julia as Julia Child; Audrey Tautou – Coco Before Chanel as Coco Chanel
**Best Actor in a Supporting Role**: **Christoph Waltz – Inglourious Basterds as Hans Landa**; Alec Baldwin – It's Complicated as Jacob Adler; Christian McKay – Me and Orson Welles as Orson Welles; Alfred Molina – An Education as Jack Mellor; Stanley Tucci – The Lovely Bones as George Harvey	**Best Actress in a Supporting Role**: **Mo'Nique – Precious as Mary Lee Johnston**; Anne-Marie Duff – Nowhere Boy as Julia Lennon; Vera Farmiga – Up in the Air as Alex Goran; Anna Kendrick – Up in the Air as Natalie Keener; Kristin Scott Thomas – Nowhere Boy as Mimi Smith
**Best Original Screenplay**: **The Hurt Locker – Mark Boal**; The Hangover – Jon Lucas and Scott Moore; Inglourious Basterds – Quentin Tarantino; A Serious Man – Joel Coen and Ethan Coen; Up – Bob Peterson and Pete Docter	**Best Adapted Screenplay**: **Up in the Air – Jason Reitman and Sheldon Turner**; District 9 – Neill Blomkamp and Terri Tatchell; An Education – Nick Hornby; In the Loop – Jesse Armstrong, Simon Blackwell, Armando Iannucci and Tony Roche; Precious – Geoffrey S. Fletcher
**Best Cinematography**: **The Hurt Locker – Barry Ackroyd**; Avatar – Mauro Fiore; District 9 – Trent Opaloch; Inglourious Basterds – Robert Richardson; The Road – Javier Aguirresarobe	**Best Costume Design**: **The Young Victoria – Sandy Powell**; Bright Star – Janet Patterson; Coco Before Chanel – Catherine Leterrier; An Education – Odile Dicks-Mireaux; A Single Man – Arianne Phillips
**Best Editing**: **The Hurt Locker – Bob Murawski and Chris Innis**; Avatar – Stephen E. Rivkin, John Refoua and James Cameron; District 9 – Julian Clarke; Inglourious Basterds – Sally Menke; Up in the Air – Dana E. Glauberman	**Best Makeup and Hair**: **The Young Victoria – Jenny Shircore**; Coco Before Chanel – Thi Thanh Tu Nguyen, Madeleine Cafano and Jane Milon; An Education – Lizzie Yianni Georgiou; The Imaginarium of Doctor Parnassus – Sarah Monzani; Nine – Peter King
**Best Original Music**: **Up – Michael Giacchino**; Avatar – James Horner; Crazy Heart – T Bone Burnett and Stephen Bruton; Fantastic Mr. Fox – Alexandre Desplat; Sex & Drugs & Rock & Roll – Chaz Jankel	**Best Production Design**: **Avatar – Rick Carter, Robert Stromberg and Kim Sinclair**; District 9 – Philip Ivey and Guy Potgieter; Harry Potter and the Half-Blood Prince – Stuart Craig and Stephenie McMillan; The Imaginarium of Doctor Parnassus – Dave Warren, Anastasia Masaro and Caroline Smith; Inglourious Basterds – David Wasco and Sandy Reynolds-Wasco
**Best Sound**: **The Hurt Locker – Ray Beckett and Paul N. J. Ottosson**; Avatar – Christopher Boyes, Gary Summers, Andy Nelson, Tony Johnson and Addison Teague; District 9 – Brent Burge, Chris Ward, Dave Whitehead, Michael Hedges and Ken Saville; Star Trek – Peter J. Devlin, Andy Nelson, Anna Behlmer, Mark Stoeckinger and Ben Burtt; Up – Tom Myers, Michael Silvers, Michael Semanick and Doc Kane	**Best Special Visual Effects**: **Avatar – Joe Letteri, Stephen Rosenbaum, Richard Baneham and Andrew R. Jones**; District 9 – Dan Kaufman, Peter Muyzers, Robert Habros and Matt Aitken; Harry Potter and the Half-Blood Prince – John Richardson, Tim Burke, Tim Alexander and Nicolas Aithadi; The Hurt Locker – Richard Stutsman; Star Trek – Roger Guyett, Russell Earl, Paul Kavanagh and Burt Dalton
**Outstanding British Film**: **Fish Tank – Kees Kasander, Nick Laws and Andrea Arnold**; An Education – Finola Dwyer, Amanda Posey, Lone Scherfig and Nick Hornby; In the Loop – Kevin Loader, Adam Tandy, Armando Iannucci, Jesse Armstrong, Simon Blackwell and Tony Roche; Moon – Stuart Fenegan, Trudie Styler, Duncan Jones and Nathan Parker; Nowhere Boy – Robert Bernstein, Douglas Rae, Kevin Loader, Sam Taylor-Johnson and Matt Greenhalgh	**Outstanding Debut by a British Writer, Director or Producer**: **Moon – Duncan Jones (Director)**; Exam – Stuart Hazeldine (Writer/Director/Producer); Mugabe and the White African – Lucy Bailey, Andrew Thompson, Elizabeth Morgan Hemlock and David Pearson (Director/Producer); Nowhere Boy – Sam Taylor-Johnson (Director); Shifty – Eran Creevy (Writer/Director)
**Best Short Animation**: **Mother of Many – Sally Arther and Emma Lazanby**; The Gruffalo – Michael Rose, Martin Pope, Jakob Schuh and Max Lang; The Happy Duckling – Gili Dolev	**Best Short Film**: **I Do Air – James Bolton and Martina Amati**; Fourteen – Asitha Ameresekere; Jade – Samm Hailay and Daniel Elliott; Mixtape – Luti Fagbenle and Luke Snellin; Off Season – Jacob Jaffke and Jonathan Van Tulleken
**Best Animated Film**: **Up – Pete Docter**; Coraline – Henry Selick; Fantastic Mr. Fox – Wes Anderson	**Best Film Not in the English Language**: **A Prophet – Pascal Caucheteux, Marco Cherqui, Alix Raynaud and Jacques Audiard**; Broken Embraces – Agustín Almodóvar and Pedro Almodóvar; Coco Before Chanel – Carole Scotta, Caroline Benjo, Philippe Carcassanne and Anne Fontaine; Let the Right One In – Carl Molinder, John Nordling and Tomas Alfredson; The White Ribbon – Stefan Arndt, Veit Heiduschka, Margaret Ménégoz and Michael Haneke
**Rising Star Award**: **Kristen Stewart**; Jesse Eisenberg; Nicholas Hoult; Carey Mulligan; Tahar Rahim

== Statistics ==
Films that received multiple nominations
Nominations	Film
8	Avatar
8	An Education
8	The Hurt Locker
7	District 9
6	Inglourious Basterds
6	Up in the Air
4	Coco Before Chanel
4	Nowhere Boy
4	Precious
4	Up
2	Crazy Heart
2	Fantastic Mr. Fox
2	Harry Potter and the Half-Blood Prince
2	The Imaginarium of Doctor Parnassus
2	In the Loop
2	The Lovely Bones
2	Moon
2	Sex & Drugs & Rock & Roll
2	A Single Man
2	Star Trek
2	The Young Victoria

Films that received multiple awards
Awards	Film
6	The Hurt Locker
2	Avatar
2	Up
2	The Young Victoria

== See also ==
- 82nd Academy Awards
- 35th César Awards
- 15th Critics' Choice Awards
- 62nd Directors Guild of America Awards
- 23rd European Film Awards
- 67th Golden Globe Awards
- 30th Golden Raspberry Awards
- 24th Goya Awards
- 25th Independent Spirit Awards
- 15th Lumière Awards
- 21st Producers Guild of America Awards
- 14th Satellite Awards
- 36th Saturn Awards
- 16th Screen Actors Guild Awards
- 62nd Writers Guild of America Awards
