= List of accolades received by District 9 =

District 9 is a 2009 science fiction thriller film directed by Neill Blomkamp. The National Board of Review named it one of the top 10 independent films of 2009. It received four Academy Awards nominations, seven British Academy Film Awards nominations, five Broadcast Film Critics Association nominations, and one Golden Globe nomination. It is the fourth film distributed by TriStar Pictures to ever be nominated for Best Picture at the Academy Awards.

== Awards and nominations ==
=== Organizations ===
Awards
Ceremony	Award	Category	Name	Outcome
82nd Academy Awards	Oscar	Best Picture	Peter Jackson & Carolynne Cunningham	Nominated
82nd Academy Awards	Oscar	Best Adapted Screenplay	Neill Blomkamp and Terri Tatchell	Nominated
82nd Academy Awards	Oscar	Best Film Editing	Julian Clarke	Nominated
82nd Academy Awards	Oscar	Best Visual Effects	Dan Kaufman, Peter Muyzers, Robert Habros and Matt Aitken	Nominated
Academy of Science Fiction, Fantasy & Horror Films	Saturn Award	Best International Film		Won
Academy of Science Fiction, Fantasy & Horror Films	Saturn Award	Best Director	Neill Blomkamp	Nominated
Academy of Science Fiction, Fantasy & Horror Films	Saturn Award	Best Writing	Neill Blomkamp, Terri Tatchell	Nominated
Academy of Science Fiction, Fantasy & Horror Films	Saturn Award	Best Make-Up	Joe Dunckley, Sarah Rubano, Frances Richardson	Nominated
Academy of Science Fiction, Fantasy & Horror Films	Saturn Award	Best Production Design	Philip Ivey	Nominated
Academy of Science Fiction, Fantasy & Horror Films	Saturn Award	Best Special Effects	Dan Kaufman, Peter Muyzers, Robert Habros, Matt Aitken	Nominated
British Academy Film Awards	David Lean Award	Best Director	Neill Blomkamp	Nominated
British Academy Film Awards	Bafta	Best Adapted Screenplay	Neill Blomkamp, Terri Tatchell	Nominated
British Academy Film Awards	Bafta	Best Cinematography	Trent Opaloch	Nominated
British Academy Film Awards	Bafta	Best Editing	Julian Clarke	Nominated
British Academy Film Awards	Bafta	Best Production Design	Philip Ivey, Guy Poltgieter	Nominated
British Academy Film Awards	Bafta	Best Sound	Brent Burge, Chris Ward, Dave Whitehead, Michael Hedges, Ken Saville	Nominated
British Academy Film Awards	Bafta	Best Special Visual Effects	Dan Kaufman, Peter Muyzers, Robert Habros, Matt Aitken	Nominated
Golden Globe Awards	Golden Globe	Best Screenplay	Neill Blomkamp, Terri Tatchell	Nominated
Hugo Award	Hugo Award	Hugo Award for Best Dramatic Presentation, Long Form	Neill Blomkamp	Nominated
IGN Movie Awards	IGN Award	Best Summer Movie		Won
IGN Movie Awards	IGN Award	Best Sci-Fi Movie		Won
IGN Movie Awards	IGN Award	Best Movie		Won
IGN Movie Awards	IGN Award	Favorite Summer Hero	Sharlto Copley	Won
IGN Movie Awards	IGN Award	Best Performance	Sharlto Copley	Won
People's Choice Awards	People's Choice Award	Favorite Independent Movie		Nominated
Satellite Awards	Satellite Award	Best Director	Neill Blomkamp	Nominated
Satellite Awards	Satellite Award	Best Film Editing	Julian Clarke	Nominated
Satellite Awards	Satellite Award	Best Screenplay, Adapted	Neill Blomkamp, Terri Tatchell	Nominated
Satellite Awards	Satellite Award	Best Visual Effects	Robert Habros, Charlie Bradbury, Stephen Pepper, Winston Helgason	Nominated
Science Fiction and Fantasy Writers of America	Bradbury Award	The Ray Bradbury Award for Outstanding Dramatic Presentation	Neill Blomkamp, Terri Tatchell	Won
USC Scripter Award	USC Scripter Award		Neill Blomkamp (screenwriter/author), Terri Tatchell (screenwriter)	Nominated

=== Guild awards ===
Awards
Ceremony	Award	Category	Name	Outcome
American Cinema Editors	ACE Eddie	Best Edited Feature Film - Dramatic	Julian Clarke	Nominated
Art Directors Guild	ADG Award	Excellence in Production Design for a Fantasy Film	Philip Ivey	Nominated
Cinema Audio Society	C.A.S Award	Outstanding Achievement in Sound Mixing for Motion Pictures	Michael Hedges, Gilbert Lake, Ken Saville	Nominated
Motion Picture Sound Editors	Golden Reel Award	Best Sound Editing: Sound Effects, Foley, Dialogue and ADR in a Foreign Feature Film	Brent Burge, Chris Ward	Won
Producers Guild of America	Darryl F. Zanuck Producer of the Year Award	Best Theatrical Motion Pictures	Carolynne Cunningham, Peter Jackson	Nominated
Visual Effects Society	VES Award	Outstanding Visual Effects in a Visual Effects Driven Feature Motion Picture	Stefanie Boose, Dan Kaufman, Peter Muyzers, James Stewart	Nominated
Visual Effects Society	VES Award	Outstanding Animated Character in a Live Action Feature Motion Picture	Steve Nichols, Jeremy Mesana, Vera Zivny, Brett Ineson	Nominated
Visual Effects Society	VES Award	Outstanding Compositing in a Feature Motion Picture	Shervin Shogian, Hamish Schumacher, Janeen Elliott, Simon Hughes	Won

=== Critics groups ===
Awards
Ceremony	Award	Category	Name	Outcome
Austin Film Critics Association	AFCA Award	Top 10 film		
Austin Film Critics Association	AFCA Award	Best First Film	Neill Blomkamp	Won
Boston Society of Film Critics	BSFC Award	Best New Filmmaker	Neill Blomkamp	Won
Broadcast Film Critics Association Awards	Critics Choice Award	Best Action Movie		Nominated
Broadcast Film Critics Association Awards	Critics Choice Award	Best Makeup	Sarah Rubano	Won
Broadcast Film Critics Association Awards	Critics Choice Award	Best Adapted Screenplay	Neill Blomkamp, Terri Tatchell	Nominated
Broadcast Film Critics Association Awards	Critics Choice Award	Best Sound		Nominated
Broadcast Film Critics Association Awards	Critics Choice Award	Best Visual Effects		Nominated
Central Ohio Film Critics Association	COFCA Award	Breakthrough Film Artist	Neill Blomkamp	Runner-up
Chicago Film Critics Association	CFCA Award	Most Promising Filmmaker	Neill Blomkamp	Won
Chicago Film Critics Association	CFCA Award	Most Promising Performer	Sharlto Copley	Nominated
Kansas City Film Critics Circle	Vincent Koehler Award	Outstanding Science Fiction, Fantasy or Horror Film		Won
Los Angeles Film Critics Association	LAFCA Award	Best Production Design	Philip Ivey	Won
Los Angeles Film Critics Association	LAFCA Award	New Generation Award	Neill Blomkamp	Won
National Board of Review Awards	NBR Award	Top 10 Independent Films		
Online Film Critics Society	OFCS Award	Best Director	Neill Blomkamp	Nominated
Online Film Critics Society	OFCS Award	Best Actor	Sharlto Copley	Nominated
Online Film Critics Society	OFCS Award	Best Adapted Screenplay	Neill Blomkamp, Terri Tatchell	Nominated
Online Film Critics Society	OFCS Award	Best Cinematography	Trent Opaloch	Nominated
Online Film Critics Society	OFCS Award	Best Editing	Julian Clarke	Nominated
Phoenix Film Critics Society	PFCS Award	Breakout Behind the Camera	Neill Blomkamp	Won
St. Louis Gateway Film Critics Association	SLGFCA Award	Most Original, Innovative or Creative Film		Nominated
St. Louis Gateway Film Critics Association	SLGFCA Award	Best Visual Effects		Nominated
