= Wayne Jacobsen =

American author (born 1953)

- Born: March 21, 1953 (age 73)
- Education: Oral Roberts University
- Occupations: Author; pastor
- Spouse: Sara Fought
- Children: 2
- Website: www.lifestream.org

Wayne Jacobsen (born March 21, 1953) is an American author and former pastor, best known for his Christian non-fiction book, He Loves Me!.

He is the founder of Lifestream Ministries and a co-host of the podcast ''The God Journey.

Jacobsen also collaborated with author William P. Young on the writing of the novel The Shack and helped create the Christian publishing company Windblown Media. He has been a contributing editor to Leadership Journal, and has authored numerous articles on spiritual formation, relational community, and engagement of culture.

== Biography ==
Jacobsen grew up on a grape vineyard in central California as the third of four sons. His family was initially involved in a Baptist fellowship before becoming part of the renewal movement. This early exposure to both traditional and experiential Christian practices informed his later spiritual journey.

Jacobsen attended Oral Roberts University in Tulsa, Oklahoma, graduating in 1975 with a bachelor's degree in Biblical Literature. Upon graduation he married Sara Fought of Urbana, Ohio, who graduated that same year.

Jacobsen began his full-time Ministry in 1975 as an Associate Pastor at Valley Christian Center in Fresno, California - a Foursquare church. He left Valley Christian Center in 1980 a to help plant a new church in Visalia, CA, The Savior’s Community, encouraging more relational engagement with God and others. He left there in 1994, when he launched Lifestream Ministries, to facilitate his writing and speaking around the world.

Through Lifestream, he has published numerous books, articles, and multimedia resources aimed at encouraging relational Christianity.

In addition to his ministry work, Jacobsen was involved in educational mediation through BridgeBuilders, an initiative aimed at resolving religious tensions in public education. He provided consultation and training for school districts and parent groups, though his involvement has since diminished.

In 2005, Jacobsen collaborated on ''The Shack,'' a Christian novel written by William P. Young. Jacobsen spent over a year rewriting the manuscript and was instrumental in the decision to self-publish the book, which went on to sell over one million copies within 13 months. He later served as a consultant for the 2017 film adaptation by Lionsgate.

Jacobsen co-hosts ''The God Journey'' podcast, where he discusses topics related to spiritual growth, relational faith, and critiques of religious institutionalism. He has also produced several teaching series including ''Transitions,'' ''The Jesus Lens,'' and ''Engage,'' many of which are available online through Lifestream.

== Personal life ==
In 2023 Jacobsen resides in Newbury Park, California with his wife Sara. Sara is actively involved in Lifestream Ministries as a board member and office manager.

They have two children, Julie (b. 1978) and Andrew (b. 1980), and three grandchildren.

== Major works ==
Jacobsen has written and co-authored several books, including; He Loves Me!, In My Father's Vineyard, Authentic Relationships, So You Don't Want to Go to Church Anymore (coauthored with Dave Coleman, using joint pseudonym Jake Colsen), The Naked Church, Beyond Sundays, Finding Church, Live Loved Free Full, In Season, A Language of Healing and Tales of the Vine.

Jacobsen cohosted a weekly podcast at TheGodJourney.com, and was a mediator on governmental issues involving church and state in educational issues.

== Selected bibliography ==
- Jacobsen, Wayne (August 1, 1998). The Naked Church (3rd ed.). Windblown Media. p. 256. ISBN 978-0964729216.
- Jacobsen, Wayne (February 1, 1992). The Vineyard. Harvest House Publishers. p. 299. ISBN 9780890819258.
- Jacobsen, Wayne (January 15, 1995). Tales of the Vine. Dick Sleeper Distribution. ISBN 9780964729209.
- Jacobsen, Wayne (1997). In My Father's Vineyard. Thomas Nelson Incorporated. ISBN 9780849952968.
- Jacobsen, Wayne (September 2, 2008). He Loves Me! Learning to Live in the Father's Affection. Windblown Media. p. 208. ISBN 978-0964729254.
- Jacobsen, Wayne; Jacobsen, Clay (2003). Authentic Relationships (1st ed.). Baker Books. p. 158. ISBN 9781585581542.
- Jacobsen, W.; Coleman, D (2006). So You Don't Want to Go to Church Anymore: An Unexpected Journey. Lifestream Ministries. p. 192. ISBN 9781935170013.
- Young, William P.; Jacobsen, Wayne; Cummings., Brad. The shack. p. 266. ISBN 978-1455567607.
- Jacobsen, Wayne (November 15, 2011). In Season: Embracing the Father's Process of Fruitfulness. Trailview Media. p. 208. ISBN 978-0983949114.
- Jacobsen, Wayne; Cummings, Brad; Whiteman, Murry (November 1, 2016). A Man Like No Other: The Illustrated Life of Jesus. Windblown Media, Inc. ISBN 978-1618710000.
- Jacobsen, Wayne (October 15, 2014). Finding Church: What If There Really Is Something More?. TrailView Media. p. 208. ISBN 978-0983949152.
- Jacobsen, Wayne (2018). Beyond Sundays: why those who are done with religious institutions can be a blessing for the Church. Newberry Park, CA: Trailview Media. ISBN 978-0-9839491-9-0.
- Jacobsen, Wayne; Taylor, Arnita Willis; Prater, Robert L. (November 19, 2019). A Language of Healing for a Polarized Nation: Creating safe environments for conversations about race, politics, sexuality, and religion. Blue Sheep Media. p. 208. ISBN 978-1734015300.
- Jacobsen, Wayne (January 1, 2021). Live Loved Free. Blue Sheep Media, LLC. p. 320. ISBN 978-1734015362.
