= Cross Roads (novel) =

2012 Christian fiction novel by author William P. Young

- Cover for the 2012 first edition hardback
- Author: William P. Young
- Language: English
- Genre: Christian
- Publisher: FaithWords
- Publication date: November 13, 2012
- Publication place: United States
- Media type: Print
- Pages: 304 pgs
- ISBN: 9781455516049

Cross Roads is a 2012 Christian fiction novel by author William P. Young. The book was released on November 13, 2012, by FaithWords and centers on a self-centered businessman who discovers another world after being struck comatose by a sudden ailment.

== Summary ==
Cross Roads follows Anthony "Tony" Spencer, an egotistical businessman that went from being a poor foster child to a successful businessman that must win at any cost. This ruthless and cruel outlook has affected his personal life as well, prompting him to remarry an ex-wife only so he could be the one to leave her the second time around, and to ignore his daughter in favor of mourning the son that died at a very young age. It's a hollow existence that is forever changed when Tony ends up in a coma due to a cerebral hemorrhage from a head trauma and a brain tumor. He re-awakens to discover himself in a strange Purgatory-like state where he is brought face-to-face with God (who appears to Tony as young, raven-haired, olive-skinned girl), Jesus, and the Holy Spirit (who has the appearance of a Lakota Indian), who sends him back to earth to go over the actions he made before going comatose. He is also informed that he will have the ability to heal one person and only one person. He can heal himself, an Alzheimer's sufferer, or a young leukemia patient. Tony initially assumes that he is merely stuck within his subconscious and goes along with the mission merely to humor the Trinity. However once he is back on earth he discovers that he is seeing the world through the eyes of several different people, but mainly African American nurse Maggie Saunders. As he's transferred from person to person, the sights that Tony witnesses are both beautiful and cruel in turn, making him question who he has become and what the impact of his past choices might be.

== Development ==
Young began writing Cross Roads while on a retreat, where he wrote the book in eleven days. He has remarked that he began writing Cross Roads as a way to "delve deeper into the human soul" after his book The Shack and to explore the themes of transformation and community. He also stated that he wanted to "dispel negative stereotypes about blacks" and other ethnicities through the character of Maggie and by portraying God as a very young trans-ethnic girl.
