= Anastasia Brown =

American music supervisor

Anastasia Brown is an American music supervisor who has worked on major motion pictures, TV series, and film soundtracks, most notably "August Rush", "Billy: The Early Years", and "Footloose". In 2021, Brown is based in Nashville, Tennessee where she has been appointed the Chief Content Strategist at Visionary Media Group. Her most recent work as a music supervisor includes the 2018 Facebook Watch Series "Queen America" and upcoming show in 2021 on Amazon Prime titled "Tell Me Your Secrets". She is also known for her work as a life coach, public speaker, columnist, and film producer connecting the Nashville Film Industry to the Los Angeles film scene.

== Career ==
When she began working in the music industry in the 1990s, Anastasia Brown was one of a few female managers in Nashville. She worked as head of the Nashville division of Miles Copeland's management company and served as an A&R consultant for his label Ark 21. She worked with Sting, Peter Frampton, Leon Russell, Waylon Jennings, Junior Brown, John Berry and Keith Urban, who became co-manager in 1994. She secured a record deal for Urban and his band "The Ranch" with Warner Bros. Records and Capitol Records.

In the early 2000s, she wanted to continue to expand her horizons working within the entertainment industry and began working with combining music and television. This desire, along with a deep passion for sharing Nashville's impeccable musicianship, is what led her to begin her first music supervision role with Steven Spielberg on his Emmy-winning 2002 Sci-Fi series titled "Taken". She continued to pursue this passion in music supervision where, in 2007, she was responsible for overseeing the musical production of the film August Rush. This film earned her an Academy Award and GRAMMY Nomination for "Best Achievement in Music Written for Pictures, Original Song". Gaining the attention of prominent film studios, she soon became a highly desired music supervisor for films relating to music or including many musical performances. After completing the Paramount Pictures re-make of Footloose directed by Craig Brewer and ABC's series G.C.B. Brown supervised The Americans for FX, the feature film Tumbledown and consulted on the Sony Pictures feature Paper Wings, aka Final Go. In 2014 she is also developing a new music driven TV show as executive producer along with Matthew McConaughey and Nigel Lythgoe titled American Troubadours.

In 2015, Brown served on the board of directors of the Nashville Film Festival.

Brown co-music supervised the New Regency 3D Sci-Fi thriller, "The Darkest Hour". She also completed work as music supervisor on the feature films Road To Nowhere, directed by Monte Hellman; as well as Nancy Meyer’s romantic comedy, It's Complicated (Universal). In 2017, Anastasia Brown worked with Lionsgate to produce the award-winning Christian film known as The Shack where she was responsible for producing the soundtrack that featured artists such as Devin Dawson, Dan + Shay, Lady A, Hillsong UNITED, and so many more. Following her work on this film, she decided to get back into television where she has most recently music supervised the Facebook Watch Television Series Queen America starring Catherine Zeta-Jones which became one of the network’s most popular shows of 2018. Currently, Anastasia is working on the Amazon Prime drama titled Tell Me Your Secrets working with Harriet Warner and Bruna Papandrea. The show is set to release in 2021.

In her free time, she is passionate about serving the Nashville community and connecting with her peers to discuss new content being created, rising artists, and to help Nashville artists get sync placements in advertisements, films, tv shows, and video games. Some of her recent placements in Film & TV have been films such as Dream House in Time, Cold Light of Day, Magic Mike, Diary of a Wimpy Kid 3 and American Girl.

In addition to her supervision work, Brown is widely recognized as one of the public faces of Nashville’s creative community and often serves as an unofficial liaison between Hollywood, New York and Nashville projects. Brown served as a judge on Nashville Star for three years. She also wrote a book, Make Me A Star, which offers guidance for aspiring artists, writers and musicians, and is currently being used as a textbook in music colleges. Brown also wrote a chapter for the Simon & Schuster published book Live and Let Love along with widow Marie Tillman, actor Maria Bello and Lee Woodruff. She also writes a monthly column, "Girl Crushes", for the magazine Nashville Edit highlighting stellar women who are taking the lead within the music industry and inspiring the next generation. As an entertainment consultant, she advises musicians, labels, publishers and corporations on how to increase profits in the film and television industry.

In 2021, Anastasia is currently working for Visionary Media Group as Chief Content Strategist. Anastasia will now direct content across platforms for Visionary Media Group's Music, Television, Film and scoring projects.

== Awards ==
- Grammy nomination; Music consultant, FOOTLOOSE, best song written for a film
- Grammy nomination; Music supervisor, AUGUST RUSH, best soundtrack
- Oscar nomination; Music supervisor, AUGUST RUSH, best original song
- Emmy win: Best TV mini-series, STEVEN SPIELBERG PRESENTS: TAKEN
- Dove nomination; Music supervisor/producer, BILLY GRAHAM: the Early Years, best soundtrack
- Women of Influence Award, inspiration
- Trailblazer Award from the Women in the Workforce Forum.
- GMA Dove Award Winner, Inspirational Film of the Year
