= The Shack (2017 film) =

- Theatrical release poster
- Directed by: Stuart Hazeldine
- Screenplay by: John Fusco; Andrew Lanham; Destin Daniel Cretton
- Based on: The Shack by William P. Young
- Produced by: Gil Netter; Brad Cummings
- Starring: Sam Worthington; Octavia Spencer; Avraham Aviv Alush; Radha Mitchell; Alice Braga; Tim McGraw
- Cinematography: Declan Quinn
- Edited by: William Steinkamp
- Music by: Aaron Zigman
- Production companies: Summit Entertainment; Gil Netter Productions; Windblown Media
- Distributed by: Lionsgate Films
- Release date: March 3, 2017 (United States)
- Running time: 132 minutes
- Country: United States
- Language: English
- Budget: $20 million
- Box office: $96.9 million

The Shack is a 2017 American fantasy drama film, directed by Stuart Hazeldine and written by John Fusco, Andrew Lanham and Destin Daniel Cretton, based on the 2007 novel. The film stars Sam Worthington, Octavia Spencer, Avraham Aviv Alush, Radha Mitchell, Alice Braga and Tim McGraw.

The story follows a grieving father who, after suffering a family tragedy, receives a mysterious invitation to visit a shack deep in the wilderness, where he confronts his darkest fears and experiences a transformative spiritual journey.

Filming began on June 8, 2015, in Vancouver, British Columbia. The Shack was released in the United States on March 3, 2017. The film received unfavorable reviews from critics, but grossed $96.9 million against a budget of $20 million.

== Plot ==
Mackenzie "Mack" Phillips endures a traumatic childhood marked by severe physical and emotional abuse at the hands of his alcoholic father, who also abuses Mack's mother. In a desperate attempt to end the violence, Mack confides in the preacher at his church, which results in his father retaliating with a brutal beating. In response, Mack's mother leaves the family. As a 13-year-old, Mack takes matters into his own hands by poisoning his father with strychnine in his whiskey.

Years later, as an adult, Mack has built a seemingly fulfilling life with his wife Nan and their 3 kids: Kate, Josh, and Missy. However, his world unravels when Missy disappears during a camping trip while Mack is rescuing Kate and Josh from a canoeing accident. The police later conclude that Missy was abducted and murdered by a serial killer, after discovering her bloodied dress in an abandoned shack in the forest. The tragedy shatters Mack's faith, and Kate blames herself for Missy's death, as she caused the canoe accident that led to Missy's abduction.

Mack's grief lingers until the arrival of winter, when he receives a mysterious note inviting him to meet at the shack. The message is signed "Papa"—Nan and Missy's affectionate name for God. Hoping to confront the killer, Mack takes his gun, borrows his friend's SUV, and drives to the shack. Along the way, he narrowly avoids a collision with a truck. Upon finding the shack empty, Mack, overcome by anger and despair, contemplates suicide. Before he can act, he encounters a stranger who leads him to a nearby house, where three random strangers invite him to stay.

The trio gradually reveal themselves as manifestations of the Holy Trinity: the African-American woman is God the Father (Papa), the Middle-Eastern man is Jesus, and the Asian woman is the Holy Spirit. Their purpose is to help Mack understand his life from a broader perspective, free him from judgment, and guide him toward healing for himself and his family after Missy's death.

Mack spends time with each member of the Trinity, helping Jesus build a wooden box and preparing the garden with the Holy Spirit. Papa, now in the form of an elderly Native American man, leads Mack to Missy's body, which they retrieve from a cave and prepare for burial. Together, they lay Missy to rest in the garden. During this process, Mack is given a glimpse of Missy in Heaven, playing joyfully with Jesus and other children, though he is unable to join her.

Mack also encounters Sophia, the personification of God's wisdom, in another cave. She helps him confront his grief and guilt. In an emotional encounter, Mack meets the spirit of his father, who apologizes for his abusive behavior. Mack, in turn, seeks forgiveness for poisoning him, finally realizing that Missy's death was not a form of divine retribution for his past actions.

With his faith restored and a sense of peace, Mack prepares to leave the divine trio and return home. However, on the way, he is involved in a collision with the same truck he had earlier avoided and awakens in a hospital. His friend reveals that Mack never made it to the shack, having crashed on the way. Despite this, Mack believes the events he experienced were real.

In the aftermath, Mack opens up to Nan about his transformative experience and reassures Kate that the canoeing accident was not her fault. The film concludes with Mack rejoining his family at church, leaving the audience to ponder whether his journey to the shack was a spiritual encounter or a product of his imagination.

== Cast ==
- Sam Worthington as Mackenzie "Mack" Phillips
  - Carson Reaume as young Mackenzie "Mack"
- Octavia Spencer as God (Papa)
- Graham Greene as Male Papa
- Radha Mitchell as Nan Phillips
- Aviv Alush as Jesus Christ
- Sumire as Holy Spirit (Sarayu)
- Tim McGraw as Willie
- Alice Braga as Sophia
- Megan Charpentier as Kate Phillips
- Gage Munroe as Josh Phillips
- Amélie Eve as Missy Phillips
- Ryan Robbins as Emil Ducette

== Production ==
Forest Whitaker was initially attached to direct and star in the film, but eventually left the project.

=== Filming ===
Principal photography for The Shack began on June 8, 2015, in Vancouver, Canada. The camping scenes were filmed at Sunnyside Campground in Cultus Lake, British Columbia, while the waterfall scenes were shot at Multnomah Falls in Oregon, a location specifically referenced in the source novel.

== Release ==
=== Box office ===
The Shack grossed $57.4 million in the United States and Canada and $39.6 million in other territories, resulting in a worldwide gross of $96.9 million.

In North America, The Shack was released on March 3, 2017, alongside Before I Fall and Logan, and was projected to gross around $10 million from 2,888 theaters during its opening weekend.[14] The film made $850,000 from Thursday night previews and $5.5 million on its first day, eventually surpassing expectations to open with $16.1 million, finishing third at the box office behind Logan and Get Out. In its second weekend, it dropped 38%, grossing $10 million and placing fourth at the box office.

== Reception ==
=== Critical response ===
On Rotten Tomatoes, The Shack holds an approval rating of 20% based on 71 reviews, with an average rating of 3.9/10. The site's critical consensus reads: "The Shack's undeniably worthy message is ill-served by a script that confuses spiritual uplift with melodramatic clichés and heavy-handed sermonizing." On Metacritic, the film has a weighted average score of 32 out of 100 based on 18 critics, indicating "generally unfavorable reviews". However, audiences were more favorable, with CinemaScore reporting an average grade of "A" on an A+ to F scale, and PostTrak showing an overall positive score of 85% and a 70% "definite recommend" rating.

Peter Sobczynski of RogerEbert.com gave the film 1.5 out of 4 stars, stating that it is "both too innocuous and too off-putting for its own good." Adam Graham of The Detroit News commented that it "feels like an overly long church sermon." The A.V. Club criticized the film's portrayal of religious themes, saying, "Most of its running time is taken with mollifying conversations between Mack and the movie's New Age-meets-Bible Belt oversimplifications of the Holy Trinity. It fits right into a long tradition of quasi-mystical pseudo-parables."

Owen Gleiberman of Variety was critical, opining that "The Shack isn't one of those films that portrays religious feeling in a way that's both reverent and truthful. It reduces faith to a kind of spiritual comfort food."

In contrast, religious and conservative critics responded more positively. Kathy Schiffer of the National Catholic Register found the film "inspiring, beautifully portrayed, and thought-provoking," especially praising the portrayal of the Trinity as "heart-warming". Wesley Baines of Beliefnet's noted that the film resonated with modern audiences because it addressed contemporary spiritual desires.

=== Controversy ===
Despite the positive response from conservative critics, The Shack attracted controversy for its portrayal of unorthodox theology, similar to the criticism faced by the book. Theologian Albert Mohler described the film's depiction of God the Father, Jesus Christ, and the Holy Spirit as "profoundly unbiblical". John Mulderig of Catholic News Service found the film to be "an intriguing endeavor" but noted several problematic theological elements. Catholic Bishop Robert Barron commented on the source material, saying, "There's a lot of sweet stuff – but you do have to spit out a few seeds." Additionally, New Testament scholar James B. DeYoung criticized the film for promoting universalism, which he characterized as heretical.

== Soundtrack ==
The Shack: Music From and Inspired By the Original Motion Picture

Soundtrack album by Various artists
- Released: February 24, 2017
- Genres: CCM, Christian hip hop, Christian rock
- Length: 52:24
- Label: Atlantic
- Producers: Kevin Weaver, Pete Ganbarg, Anastasia Brown

The accompanying soundtrack for The Shack features contributions from popular artists, primarily within the genres of country music and contemporary Christian music. Released on February 24, 2017, through Atlantic Records, the soundtrack includes a range of songs crafted specifically to complement the film's themes.

A new duet by Tim McGraw and Faith Hill, titled "Keep Your Eyes On Me", was written and recorded for the film and is featured prominently in the trailer. The track was released digitally on January 27, 2017, as the soundtrack's first promotional single. This was followed by Dan + Shay's promotional track, "When I Pray for You", released on February 3, 2017. Additionally, Christian rock band Skillet released an acoustic version of their song "Stars", originally from their album Unleashed, along with a music video that was featured in the film's promotional materials.

=== Track listing ===
No.	Title	Performer(s)	Length
1.	"When I Pray for You"	Dan + Shay	3:29
2.	"Keep Your Eyes on Me"	Tim McGraw and Faith Hill	4:11
3.	"Lay Our Flowers Down"	Lady Antebellum	3:12
4.	"Heaven Knows"	Hillsong UNITED	4:44
5.	"Where Were You"	Francesca Battistelli	3:07
6.	"Love Goes On"	Kelly Clarkson and Aloe Blacc	3:54
7.	"River of Jordan"	Lecrae featuring Breyan Isaac	3:45
8.	"Hard Love"	NEEDTOBREATHE featuring Lauren Daigle	3:37
9.	"Days of Dark"	Dierks Bentley	4:13
10.	"Phone Call to God"	Brett Eldredge	3:57
11.	"Honest to God"	Devin Dawson	3:14
12.	"Stars (The Shack version)"	Skillet	3:45
13.	"I'll Think About You"	We Are Messengers	3:56
14.	"Amazing Grace"	for KING & COUNTRY	3:22

=== Charts ===
Chart (2017)	Peak position
US Billboard 200	40
US Christian Albums (Billboard)	1
US Soundtrack Albums (Billboard)	6
