= Colin Salmon =

English actor (born 1961)

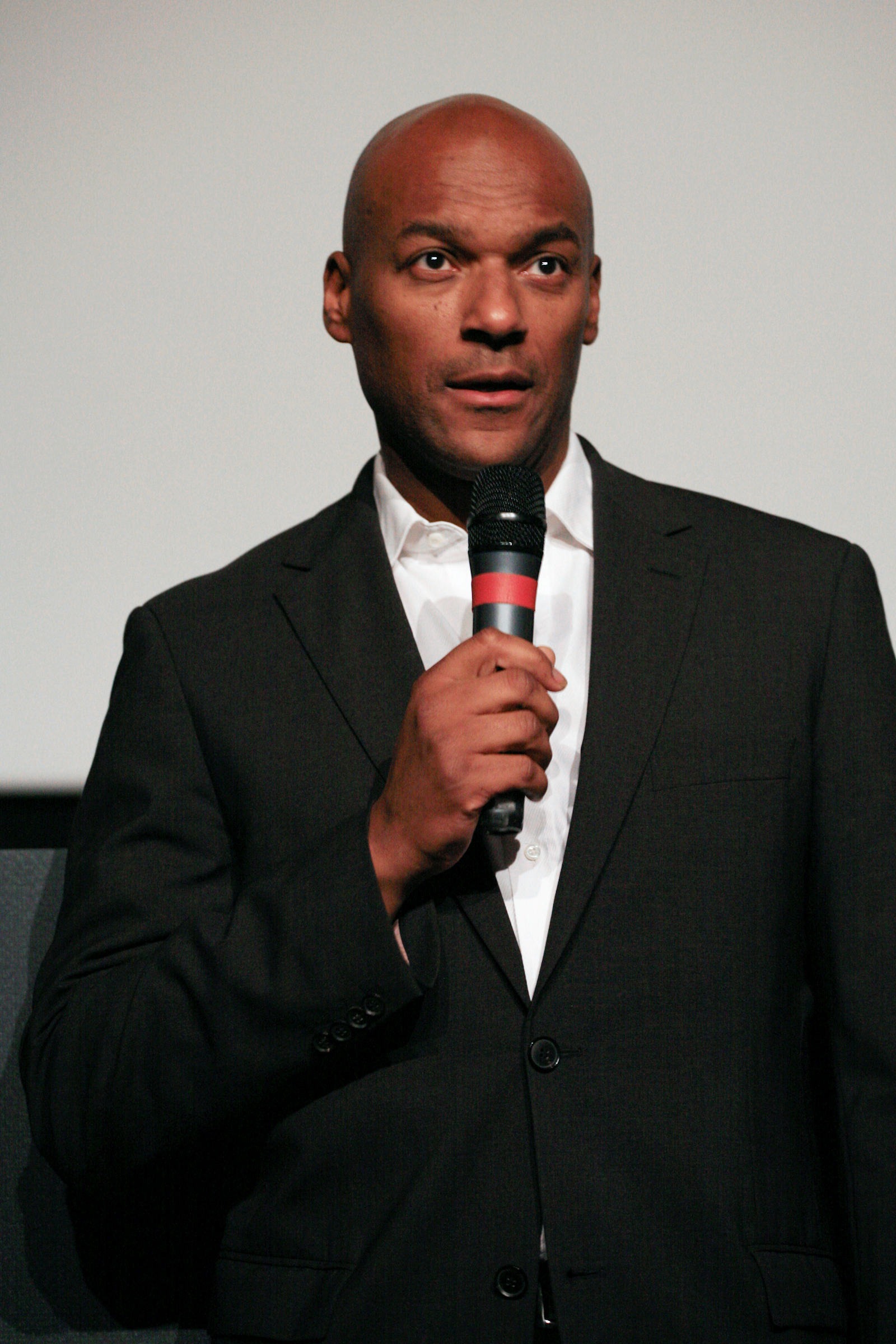
- Salmon in 2008
- Born: Colin Roy Salmon; 6 December 1961 (age 64); Bethnal Green, London, England
- Education: Ashcroft High School
- Occupation: Actor
- Years active: 1992–present
- Spouse: Fiona Hawthorne (m. 1988)
- Children: 4

Colin Roy Salmon (born 6 December 1961) is an English actor and musician. He is known for playing Charles Robinson in three James Bond films and James "One" Shade in the Resident Evil film series. He has had roles in many television series such as Doctor Who, Merlin, Arrow, and The Musketeers. He also played General Zod on the Syfy series Krypton and provided his voice and likeness as Agent Carson in the PlayStation VR video game Blood & Truth. In 2023, he joined the BBC soap opera EastEnders as George Knight.

== Early life ==
Colin Roy Salmon was born on 6 December 1961 in Bethnal Green, London, England, the son of Sylvia Ivy Brudenell Salmon, a nurse. He is of Jamaican descent. He grew up in Luton, Bedfordshire and attended Ashcroft High School.

On leaving school, Salmon became the drummer in the punk rock band the Friction, which he formed along with three friends from high school. The band released a 7-inch EP, a live cassette, a cassette-EP and performed regularly around Luton in 1979 and 1980. Salmon briefly worked with another band, the Tee Vees, and was also a singer and trumpeter in Luton-based band Catch in the mid-1980s. He plays trumpet and has his own jazz quartet, playing at venues such as the Dorchester Grill Room and at events such as the Cheltenham Jazz Festival.

Speaking about his quartet to Pete Lewis of the magazine Blues & Soul, in an interview prior to their performance at the Cheltenham Jazz Festival in May 2008, Salmon stated:

In terms of recording, we've done none. We've mostly just done very occasional performances – usually at very special events. You know, keeping a consistent band going is a bit like getting the Aston Martin out the garage – you have to run it every now and then! And what's made that particularly difficult in the last year, for example, is that I've literally just spent an entire 12 months travelling the world acting – from China through to Montreal to Botswana. But, having said that, with the children being older I do have more time when I am at home these days. So we have been able to do some rehearsing together. And, while we've always mostly performed standards, I have actually for the first time written some new stuff in time for this upcoming Cheltenham gig.

== Career ==
Salmon is known for his role as Charles Robinson, a character in the James Bond films Tomorrow Never Dies, The World Is Not Enough and Die Another Day. He made his feature debut in 1992 as Sgt. Robert Oswald in the British mini-series Prime Suspect 2. Salmon also played Note Makoti in the No. 1 Ladies' Detective Agency and David Tyrel in the Sky One UK television series Hex. He appears as himself in the sixth episode of the BBC Three comedy, Little Miss Jocelyn. On February 28th 1996 - Sebastian Bird in Silent witness, series one, episode 4, part 2.

In 2006 he appeared in the eighth series of the ITV drama Bad Girls as Senior Medical Officer Dr. Rowan Dunlop. He played Dr. Moon in two episodes ("Silence in the Library" and "Forest of the Dead") of the fourth series of the long running science fiction television series Doctor Who. There were rumours that he would take on the coveted lead role of The Doctor in 2008 after David Tennant, but the role went to Matt Smith. In 2020, writer Steven Moffat stated he envisioned Salmon's character as a future incarnation of the Doctor.

Salmon has also recorded the role of Kerr Avon in the audio series of Blake's 7. Salmon played James "One" Shade in the film Resident Evil (2002) and reprised the role as a clone version in the 2012 sequel Resident Evil: Retribution. Salmon also played Oonu, squad leader of the Skybax in the 2002 mini-series Dinotopia. His other film credits include Captives (1994), Frantz Fanon: Black Skin White Mask (a documentary directed by Isaac Julien in which Salmon plays the French psychiatrist, philosopher and revolutionary, Frantz Fanon) (1996), The Wisdom of Crocodiles (1998), Fanny and Elvis (1999) and My Kingdom (2001).

In 2007, Salmon appeared in the season finale of the ITV2 series Secret Diary of a Call Girl, playing a client of the protagonist, a call girl named Hannah Baxter. In the 2008 film Clubbed, a film about nightclub bouncers in Coventry in the 1980s, Salmon plays one of the main characters, Louis.

In 2009, Salmon appeared in the UK version of the popular American drama Law & Order, as barrister Doug Greer in the episodes "Buried" and "Community Service". In 2011, Salmon appeared in Death in Paradise, as killer/businessman Leon Hamilton/Vincent Carter. He starred in the thriller film Exam, directed by Stuart Hazeldine.

Salmon was one of the celebrity contestants on the tenth series of BBC One's Strictly Come Dancing, partnered with professional dancer Kristina Rihanoff. He was eliminated as a result of the "dance-off" in Week 5, in which he competed against Richard Arnold. In 2015, he played a fictional version of himself in the Netflix series Master of None, alongside Aziz Ansari's main character. On 9 May 2015, Salmon gave a reading at VE Day 70: A Party to Remember in Horse Guards Parade, London. In 2018, he portrayed the role of Chudleigh Pomeroy in Mortal Engines.

In 2023, Salmon joined the cast of the BBC soap opera EastEnders as George Knight, a newly introduced co-owner of the Queen Vic.

== Personal life ==
Salmon is a patron of the African-Caribbean Leukaemia Trust and the Richard House Children's Hospice and an ambassador for The Prince's Trust. He is also the chairman of governors at St Anne's Nursery. He is involved in the Notting Hill Carnival and is the dance captain of the Fox Carnival Band.

Salmon married visual artist Fiona Hawthorne in 1988 and the couple have four children.

In September 2010, Salmon was invited by his friend Samuel L. Jackson to Switzerland for Shooting Stars Benefits 2010 Golf Tournaments. The golf competition raised money for the Samuel L. Jackson Foundation and the Swiss Red Cross to go towards a new hospital in Takéo Province, one of Cambodia's poorest provinces. In 2009 he became a co-founder of Cage Cricket with Trevor McArdle.

In an August 2021 interview, Salmon spoke about how becoming ill with COVID-19 had affected him and his family, praising doctors for having saved his life.

== Filmography ==
=== Film ===
Year	Title	Role	Notes
1994	Captives	Towler	
1995	All Men Are Mortal	Chas	
1997	Tomorrow Never Dies	MI6 Deputy Chief of Staff Charles Robinson	
1998	Immortality	Martin	
1999	The World Is Not Enough	MI6 Deputy Chief of Staff Charles Robinson	
1999	Fanny and Elvis	Alan	
2001	My Kingdom	"The Chair"	
2002	Resident Evil	James "One" Shade	
2002	Die Another Day	MI6 Deputy Chief of Staff Charles Robinson	
2003	The Statement	Father Patrice	
2004	Freeze Frame	Detective Mountjoy	
2004	Alien vs. Predator	Maxwell Stafford	
2005	Match Point	Ian	
2008	The Bank Job	Hakim Jamal	
2008	Credo	Dr. Reynolds	
2008	Clubbed	Louis	
2008	Punisher: War Zone	FBI Agent Paul Budiansky	
2008	Blood: The Last Vampire	Powell	
2009	Exam	The Invigilator	
2009	K	Vaughn	
2010	Freestyle	Carter	
2010	Shank	"Boogie"	
2010	Just for the Record	Maynard Stark	
2010	Devil's Playground	Peter White	
2010	Stalker	Leo Fox	
2011	Moving Target	Ralph	
2011	High Chicago	Sam	
2011	How to Stop Being a Loser	Dennis	
2012	Resident Evil: Retribution	James "One" Shade's clone	
2015	The Rapture	Jean-Paul	
2015	Meet Pursuit Delange: The Movie	Sergeant Gabriel / Archangel Gabriel	
2016	London Has Fallen	Commissioner Sir Kevin Hazard	
2016	Criminal	The Warden	
2018	Mortal Engines	Chudleigh Pomeroy	
2020	The Bet	Cal	
2020	Deathstroke: Knights & Dragons	William Wintergreen	Direct-to-video film
2021	Nobody	The Barber	
2021	Zone 414	Hawthorne	
2022	Prey for the Devil	Father Quinn	
2023	Hammarskjöld	Ralph Bunche	
2025	Nobody 2	The Barber	

=== Television ===
Year	Title	Role	Notes
1992	Prime Suspect 2	Sergeant Bob Oswald	
1993	Lovejoy	Rathbone	Episode: "The Kakiemon Tiger"
1993	Between the Lines	Eric Hutchinson	Episode: "The Fifth Estate"
1994	Murder Most Horrid	Lambert	Episode: "Overkill"
1994	Soldier Soldier	Colour Sergeant Dennis Ryan	2 episodes
1995	All Men Are Mortal	Chas	
1995	Shine on Harvey Moon	Noah Hawksley	
1995	Frantz Fanon: Black Skin, White Mask	Frantz Fanon	Documentary
1996, 2019	Silent Witness	Sebastian Bird; Noah Taylor	4 episodes
1996	Tales from the Crypt	Jimmy Picket	Episode: "Cold War"
1997	No Child of Mine	Paul	Television film
1997	Band of Gold	Raymond	2 episodes
2001	Mind Games	DCI Ricky Grover	Television film
2001	Judge John Deed	Willy Radcliff	2 episodes
2002	Dinotopia	Captain Oonu	TV miniseries
2002	The Red Phone: Manhunt	Cooper	Television film
2002	Murder in Mind	Alex Treeve	Episode 3.7: "Justice"
2003	Red Phone 2	Cooper	Television film
2003	Keen Eddie	Superintendent Nathanial Johnson	Main role
2004	Trial & Retribution	Colin Thorpe	2 episodes
2004	Hex	David Tyrel	Main role
2005	Sea of Souls	Peter Locke	2 episodes
2006	Bad Girls	Dr. Rowan Dunlop	Series 8
2006	Little Miss Jocelyn	Unknown	Episode 1.6
2006	The Outsiders	The Trainer	Television film
2007	Party Animals	Stephen Templeton	
2007	Secret Diary of a Call Girl	Mitchell	Episode 1.8
2008	Doctor Who	Dr. Moon	Episodes: "Silence in the Library" and "Forest of the Dead"
2008–2009	The No. 1 Ladies' Detective Agency	Note Makoti	2 episodes
2009–2014	Law & Order: UK	Doug Greer	4 episodes
2009	The Omid Djalili Show	007	3 episodes
2009	Merlin	Aglain	Episode: "The Nightmare Begins"
2009	Annihilation Earth	Raja Rahim Bashir	Television film
2010	Strike Back	James Middleton	4 episodes
2010	Rev.	Leon	Episode 1.5
2010	Spooks	Alton Beecher	2 episodes
2010–2016	The Increasingly Poor Decisions of Todd Margaret	Hudson	6 episodes
2011	Death in Paradise	Vincent Carter	Episode 1.5
2011–2012	Single Ladies	Jerry Waters	7 episodes
2012–2014	Arrow	Walter Steele	14 episodes
2012–2014	Some Girls	Rob Bennett	Recurring role
2013	Rita	Colin Paige	Television film
2013	NTSF:SD:SUV::	Graham	Episode: "U-KO'ed"
2014	24: Live Another Day	General Coburn	7 episodes
2015	No Offence	Superintendent Darren MacLaren	Main role
2015	The Musketeers	Tariq Alaman	Episode: "The Good Traitor"
2015	A.D. The Bible Continues	Gabra	2 episodes
2015	Master of None	Colin Salmon	Episode: "The Other Man"
2015–2016	Limitless	Jarrod Sands	Recurring role
2016	Judi Dench: All the World's Her Stage	Himself	Narrator of BBC documentary about Judi Dench
2017	Henry lX	Major	Recurring role
2017	Tracey Ullman's Show	Various	
2017–2018	Sofia the First	Orion	Recurring role; series 4
2018–2019	Krypton	General Dru-Zod	Main role; 18 episodes
2021–2023	Midsomer Murders	Gerard King	2 episodes
2023–present	EastEnders	George Knight	Regular role
2023–present	Changing Ends	Ron	Main role; 11 episodes
2023	The Lazarus Project	Robin Lerner	Recurring role; 7 episodes, series 2
2023	Pointless Celebrities	Contestant	Series 16, Episode 8
2025	EastEnders: 40 Years on the Square	Himself	Interviewed guest

=== Audio ===
Year	Title	Role
2007	Blake's 7 (A Rebellion Reborn)	Kerr Avon
2017	Alien: River of Pain	Captain Demian Brackett
2021	The Hound of the Baskervilles	Sherlock Holmes
