= HPA Award for Outstanding Visual Effects – Feature Film =

Annual award given by the Hollywood Professional Association

The Hollywood Professional Association Award for Outstanding Visual Effects in a Feature Film is an annual award, given by the Hollywood Professional Association (HPA) to post production workers in the film and television industry, in this case visual effects artists. It was first awarded in 2006, and, outside of 2007 and 2008, has been presented every year since. From 2006 to 2012, the category was titled HPA Award for Outstanding Compositing - Feature Film.

== Winners and nominees ==
=== 2000s ===
Outstanding Compositing - Feature Film

Year	Film	Winners/Nominees
2006	Pirates of the Caribbean: Dead Man's Chest	Eddie Pasquarello, Kimberly Lashbrook, Tory Mercer, Gregory Salter
2006	King Kong	Erik Winquist, Charles Tait, Johan Åberg, G.G. Heitmann Demers
2009	Transformers: Revenge of the Fallen	Nelson Sepulveda, Ben O'Brien, Matt Brumit, Robert Hoffmeister
2009	Star Trek	Eddie Pasquarello, Grady Cofer, Gregory Salter, Conny Fauser

=== 2010s ===
Year	Film	Winners/Nominees
2010	Avatar	Erik Winquist, Robin Hollander, Erich Eder, Giuseppe Tagliavini
2010	Avatar	Eddie Pasquarello, Ben O'Brien, Conny Fauser, Jason Billington
2010	Iron Man 2	Jon Alexander, Patrick Brennan, Amy Shepard, Jason Porter
2010	Prince of Persia: The Sands of Time	Christian Zeh, Mark Bakowski, Adrian Metzelaar, John Peck
2010	Sherlock Holmes	Kate Windibank, Jan Adamczyk, Sam Osborne, Alex Cumming
2011	Transformers: Dark of the Moon	Jeff Sutherland, Jason Billington, Christopher Balog, Ben O'Brien
2011	The Chronicles of Narnia: The Voyage of the Dawn Treader	Julien Goldsbrough, Alex Payman, Jan Adamczyk
2011	Harry Potter and the Deathly Hallows – Part 1	Christian Kaestner, Kyle McCulloch, Russell Horth, Conrad Olson
2011	Water for Elephants	Paul Graff, Brian Sales, Gregory S. Scribner, Christina Spring
2011	X-Men: First Class	Matt Holland, Tim Hey, Norman Cates, G.G. Heitmann Demers
2012	The Avengers	Nelson Sepulveda, Alan Travis (rotoscoping supervisors); Peter Demarest (digital compositor); Chris Bayz (digital artist)
2012	The Avengers	Matt Holland, Tim Hey (compositing supervisors); Caterina Schiffers (digital compositor); Steve McGillen (senior compositor)
2012	Battleship	Marshall Richard Krasser (compositing supervisor); Ben O'Brien, Sherry Hitch (cg sequence supervisors); Michael Conte (digital artist)
2012	John Carter	Zave Jackson, Helen Newby (visual effects supervisors); Aymeric Perceval (senior compositor); Jamie Wood (composite supervisor)
2012	Prometheus	Alfred Mürrle, Christoph Salzmann, Florian Schroeder, Paul Redican (compositing leads)

Outstanding Visual Effects - Feature Film

Year	Film	Winners/Nominees
2013	Pacific Rim	Lindy DeQuattro, Eddie Pasquarello, Nigel Sumner (visual effects supervisors); Derrick Carlin, Chris Lentz (animation supervisors)
2013	The Hobbit: An Unexpected Journey	Joe Letteri, Eric Saindon, R. Christopher White (visual effects supervisors); David Clayton, Eric Reynolds (animation supervisors)
2013	Iron Man 3	Guy Williams, Matt Aitken (visual effects supervisors); Aaron Gilman (animation supervisor); Daniel Macarin, Thrain Shadbolt (cg supervisors)
2013	Man of Steel	Keith Miller (visual effects supervisor); Daniel Barrett (animation supervisor); Phillip Leonhardt, Thelvin Cabezas, Mark Tait (cg supervisors)
2013	Star Trek Into Darkness	Daniel Pearson (cg supervisor); Jay Cooper, Alex Prichard (compositing supervisors); Adrien Saint Girons (lead lighting technical director); Adam Watkins (digital effects supervisor)
2014	Dawn of the Planet of the Apes	Joe Letteri, Dan Lemmon, Erik Winquist, Keith Miller (visual effects supervisors); Paul Story (animation supervisor)
2014	Captain America: The Winter Soldier	Russell Earl (visual effects supervisor), Steve Rawlins (animation supervisor), François Lambert (compositing supervisor), Daniel Pearson (cg supervisor), Johan Thorngren (digital matte supervisor)
2014	Gravity	Tim Webber (visual effects supervisor), Chris Lawrence (cg supervisor), Max Solomon (animation supervisor), Paul Beilby (cg lighting supervisor), Stuart Penn (cg sequence supervisor)
2014	The Hobbit: The Desolation of Smaug	Joe Letteri, Eric Saindon, R. Christopher White (visual effects supervisors); David Clayton, Eric Reynolds (animation supervisors)
2014	Maleficent	Carey Villegas, Adam Valdez, Seth Maury (visual effects supervisors); Kevin T. Hahn (compositing supervisor); David Seager (cg supervisor)
2015	The Hobbit: The Battle of the Five Armies	Joe Letteri, Eric Saindon, R. Christopher White, Matt Aitken (visual effects supervisors); David Clayton (animation supervisor)
2015	Birdman or (The Unexpected Virtue of Ignorance)	Ara Khanikian, Sébastien Moreau (visual effects supervisors); Sebastien Francoeur (cg supervisor); Patrick David (lead compositor); Laurent Spillemaecker (lead compositor)
2015	Into the Woods	Matt Johnson, Christian Irles (visual effects supervisors); Dann Tarmy (cg supervisor); Nicolas Chevallier (compositing supervisor); Benoit Dubuc (animation supervisor)
2015	Jurassic World	Tim Alexander, Martyn 'Moose' Culpitt (visual effects supervisors); Glen McIntosh, Kevin Martel (animation supervisors); Tony Plett (lead digital artist)
2015	Tomorrowland	Craig Hammack, Eddie Pasquarello (visual effects supervisors); François Lambert (compositing supervisor); Maia Kayser (animation supervisor); Barry Williams (lead digital artist)
2016	The Jungle Book	Robert Legato, Adam Valdez, Charley Henley, Keith Miller (visual effects supervisors); Andrew R. Jones (animation supervisor)
2016	Captain America: Civil War	Russell Earl (visual effects supervisor), Steve Rawlins (animation supervisor), François Lambert (compositing supervisor), Pat Conran (cg supervisor), Rhys Claringbull (cg lead artist)
2016	The Martian	Chris Lawrence (visual effects supervisor), Neil Weatherley (cg supervisor), Bronwyn Edwards (compositing supervisor), Dale Newton (animation supervisor)
2016	Star Wars: The Force Awakens	Jay Cooper (compositing supervisor), Yannick Dusseault (visual effects art director), Rick Hankins (lead digital artist), Carlos Munoz (asset and environment supervisor), Polly Ing (cg supervisor)
2016	Teenage Mutant Ninja Turtles: Out of the Shadows	Pablo Helman, Robert Weaver (visual effects supervisors); Kevin Martel (animation supervisor); Shawn Kelly (lead animator); Nelson Sepulveda (compositing supervisor)
2017	War for the Planet of the Apes	Dan Lemmon, Anders Langlands, Luke Millar, Erik Winquist (visual effects supervisors); Daniel Barrett (animation supervisor)
2017	Beauty and the Beast	Kyle McCulloch, Glen Pratt, Richard R. Hoover (visual effects supervisors); Dale Newton (animation supervisor); Neil Weatherley (cg supervisor)
2017	Ghost in the Shell	Guillaume Rocheron, Axel Bonami, Asregadoo Arundi (visual effects supervisors); Ruslan Borysov (compositing supervisor); Pier Lefebvre (lead matte painter)
2017	Guardians of the Galaxy Vol. 2	Guy Williams, Kevin Andrew Smith (visual effects supervisor); Charles Tait (compositing supervisor); Daniel Macarin (cg supervisor); David Clayton (animation supervisor)
2017	Pirates of the Caribbean: Dead Men Tell No Tales	Gary Brozenich, Sheldon Stopsack, Patrick Ledda (visual effects supervisors); Richard Clegg (cg supervisor); Richard Little (compositing supervisor)
2018	Avengers: Infinity War	Matt Aitken, Charles Tait (visual effects supervisors); Paul Story (animation supervisor); David Conley, Marvyn Young (visual effects producers)
2018	Blade Runner 2049	Richard Clegg (visual effects supervisor); Wesley Chandler (animation supervisor); Axel Akesson (asset supervisor); Stefano Carta, Ian Cooke-Grimes (digital artists)
2018	Maze Runner: The Death Cure	R. Christopher White, Daniel Macarin (visual effects supervisors); Phillip Leonhardt (cg supervisor); Paul Ramsden, Jeremy Fort (digital artists)
2018	Rampage	Erik Winquist, Thrain Shadbolt (visual effects supervisors); Ben Pickering (visual effects producer); Stephen Unterfranz (cg supervisor); David Clayton (animation supervisor)
2018	Thor: Ragnarok	Kyle McCulloch, Alexis Wajsbrot (visual effects supervisors); Harry Bardak (cg supervisor); Benjamin Loch (digital artist)
2019	The Lion King	Robert Legato, Elliot Newman, Adam Valdez (visual effects supervisors); Andrew R. Jones (animation supervisor); Audrey Ferrara (environments supervisor); Tom C. Peitzman (visual effects producer)
2019	Alita: Battle Angel	Eric Saindon (visual effects supervisor); Michael Cozens (animation supervisor); Dejan Momcilovic (motion capture supervisor); Mark Haenga (lead facial modeler); Kevin L. Sherwood (visual effects producer)
2019	Avengers: Endgame	Matt Aitken (visual effects supervisor); Sidney Kombo (animation supervisor); Sean Noel Walker (cg supervisor); David Conley, Marvyn Young (visual effects producers)
2019	Detective Pikachu	Jonathan Fawkner, Carlos Monzon (visual effects supervisors); Gavin McKenzie (compositing supervisor); Dale Newton (animation supervisor); Fabio Zangla (cg supervisor)
2019	Spider-Man: Far From Home	Alexis Wajsbrot (visual effects supervisor), Stephen Kennedy (compositing supervisor), Nathan McConnel (animation supervisor), Sylvain Degrotte (cg supervisor), Jonathan Opgenhaffen (concept artist)
