= Stuart Hazeldine =

British screenwriter, film producer and director (born 1971)

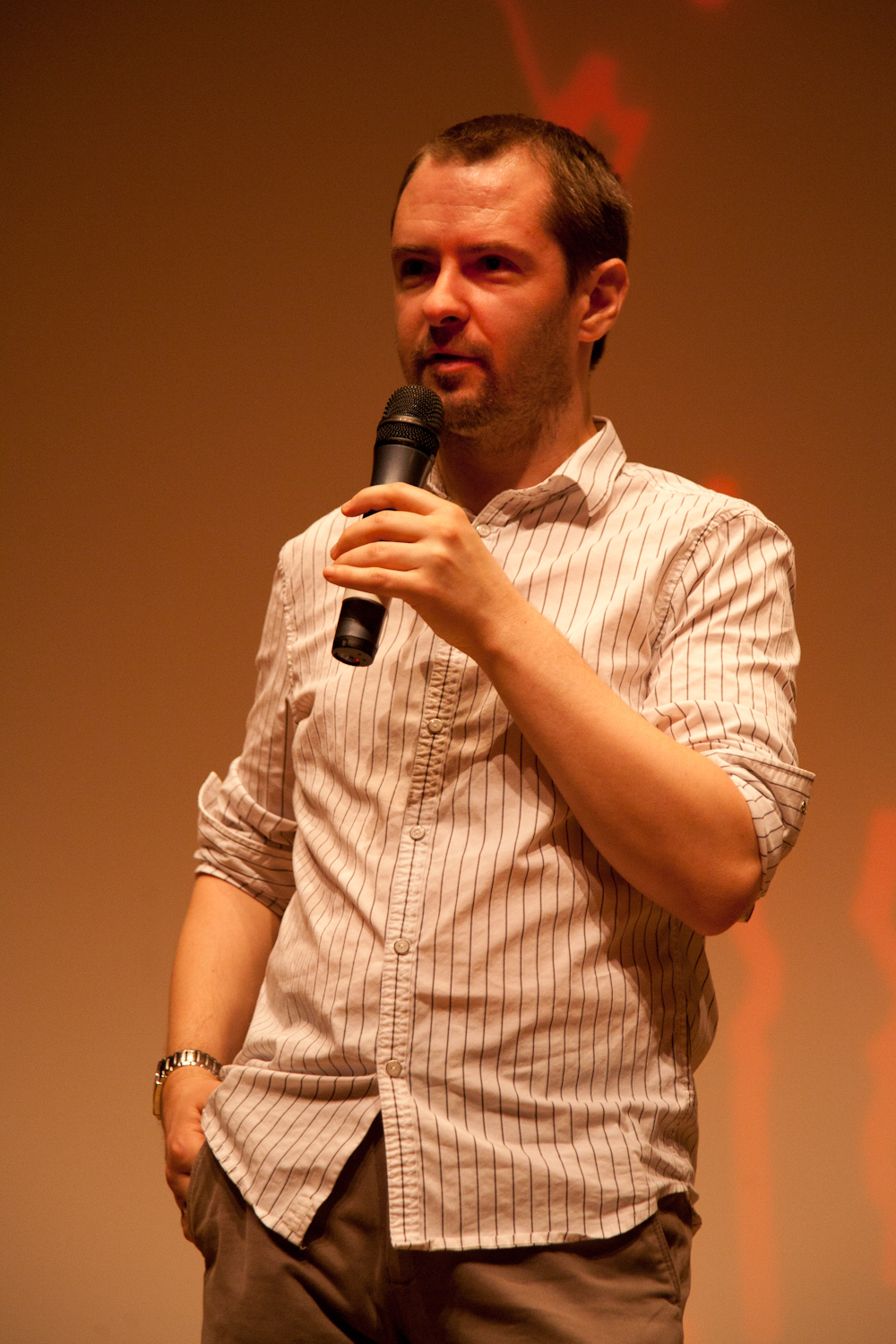
- Hazeldine in 2010
- Born: 10 June 1971 (age 55); Surrey, England
- Occupation: Writer/Director
- Years active: 1994–present

Stuart Hazeldine (born 10 June 1971 in Surrey, England) is a British screenwriter, film producer and director. He is best known for his 2009 psychological thriller Exam, for which he was nominated for a BAFTA Award for Outstanding Debut by a British Writer, Director or Producer. He also directed the 2017 film adaptation of William P. Young's novel The Shack. He currently resides in London.

== Biography ==
Raised in Hersham, Surrey, he began making student films while studying American History at the University of Kent and the University of Massachusetts Amherst. After graduation, he sold his first feature screenplay, Underground, to British producers Jeremy Bolt and Paul Trijbits in 1995.

His first produced script was the science fiction adventure TV movie Riverworld, based on the novels by Philip Jose Farmer, for Alliance Atlantis and the Sci Fi Channel. It premiered in March 2003.

In 2005 he wrote and directed his debut short film, Christian.

In 2006 he rewrote the supernatural thriller Knowing, directed by Alex Proyas and starring Nicolas Cage, then he adapted John Milton's epic poem Paradise Lost for Legendary Pictures.

In 2007 he wrote an uncredited draft of the remake of The Day the Earth Stood Still, directed by Scott Derrickson and starring Keanu Reeves, and co-wrote an adaptation of John Christopher's science fiction trilogy The Tripods with Alex Proyas.

In 2010/11 he co-wrote the screenplay Moses, based on the life of the Biblical prophet and leader, with American writer Michael Green for Lin Pictures and Warner Bros.

In 2013 he rewrote the historical epic Agincourt, based on the Bernard Cornwell novel Azincourt, for director Michael Mann and Independent Film Company.

He identifies as a Christian.

=== Exam ===
In 2008 he wrote, directed, produced and financed his debut feature film, the psychological thriller Exam, which stars Luke Mably, Colin Salmon and Jimi Mistry. The film was completed in May 2009 and received its World Premiere at the Edinburgh Film Festival on 19 June 2009. It then screened at the Raindance Film Festival 2009 where it was nominated for Best UK Feature and was subsequently nominated for the Raindance Award (for films made 'under the radar' without industry help) at the 2009 British Independent Film Awards.

The film was released in UK cinemas on 8 January 2010 by Hazeldine Films and Miracle Communications, garnering four star reviews from Empire, Total Film and Little White Lies magazines and on 7 June it was released on DVD and Blu-ray by Sony Pictures Home Entertainment.

Stuart was nominated for "Outstanding Debut by a British Writer, Director or Producer" at the BAFTA Awards 2010 and the film went on to win the Panavision Independent Spirit Award at the Santa Barbara International Film Festival 2010 and the Bronze Hitchcock Award at the Dinard Film Festival 2010. During 2010 it also played at the Palm Beach International Film Festival, the Amsterdam Fantastic Film Festival and the San Sebastian Fantasy/Horror Film Festival.

Independent Film Company sold the film to nineteen territories, ten of them for theatrical release including France, Russia and Japan. IFC Films acquired US rights, releasing it via their Midnight genre label on Demand on 23 July 2010 and on DVD on 16 November.

=== The Shack ===
In 2015, Hazeldine began production on the faith-based drama The Shack, based on the bestselling novel by William P. Young and produced by Gil Netter and Brad Cummings for Summit Entertainment. The film stars Sam Worthington, Octavia Spencer and Tim McGraw and it was released on 3 March 2017.

== Works ==
=== Produced screenplays ===
- Riverworld (also co-executive producer)
- Mutant Chronicles (uncredited rewrite)
- The Day the Earth Stood Still (uncredited rewrite)
- Knowing (uncredited rewrite)
- Exam (also producer, director)

=== Unproduced screenplays (selected) ===
- Underground (action thriller)
- Alien: Earthbound(spec Alien sequel)
- Blade Runner Down (spec Blade Runner sequel)
- Take Me Away (British youth drama)
- The Tenth Victim (remake of The 10th Victim)
- Paycheck (unused draft)
- Rizen (horror thriller)
- The Masque of the Red Death (fantasy horror)
- Providence, R.I. (dramatic thriller)
- Battle Chasers (fantasy)
- Paradise Lost (fantasy)
- 10-13 (TV pilot) (supernatural thriller)
- The Tripods (sci-fi adventure)
- Moses (biblical epic)
- Agincourt (historical action)

=== As director ===
- Christian (2005, short)
- Exam (2009)
- The Shack (2017)
