= Eve (Young novel) =

2015 novel by William P. Young

- First edition
- Author: William P. Young
- Language: English
- Genre: Christian fantasy
- Published: 2015
- Publisher: Howard Books
- Publication place: United States
- Media type: Print, e-book
- Website: wmpaulyoung.com/eve-book/

Eve is a 2015 Christian fantasy novel written by William P. Young.

== Plot ==
A retelling of the biblical fall of man told from a female perspective, the novel tells the story of Lilly Fields, the broken daughter of Eve.
