= Randal Rauser =

Canadian Baptist theologian

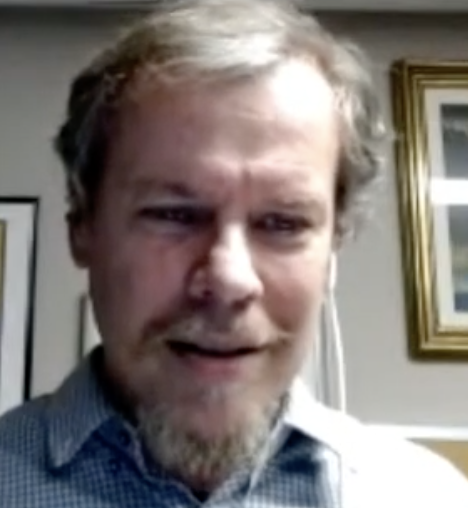
- Rauser in 2022
- Born: Randal D. Rauser

Academic background
- Education: Trinity Western University; Regent College; King's College, London
- Doctoral advisor: Colin Gunton

Academic work
- Discipline: Theology
- Sub-discipline: Historical theology
- School or tradition: Baptist
- Institutions: Taylor Seminary
- Website: randalrauser.com

Randal D. Rauser is a Canadian theologian who serves as an associate professor of historical theology at Taylor Seminary.

== Biography ==
=== Education ===
Randal Rauser graduated with distinction from Trinity Western University in 1996 with a double major in English and Intercultural Religious Studies. In 2003, he earned his PhD from King’s College, London; his dissertation being “Trinity, Mind and World: A Theological Epistemology of Mediation”.

== Work ==
Rauser wrote a guide to The Shack in his companion volume Finding God in the Shack (Paternoster, 2009). In the book Rauser responds to many of the objections raised by critics like Chuck Colson and Albert Mohler. Rauser has written a book with the ex-Christian minister and atheist polemicist John W. Loftus and debated him on radio. Rauser has attempted to persuade people to practise analytic philosophy.

=== Reception ===
Eugene H. Peterson praised Rauser as a "skilled and accessible theologian". Dean Zimmerman praised Rauser as having the "intellectual honesty to face up to the genuine difficulties confronting his faith". Rauser and Peter Enns have discussed their views on biblical inerrancy.
