= John W. Loftus =

American atheist author

John Wayne Loftus
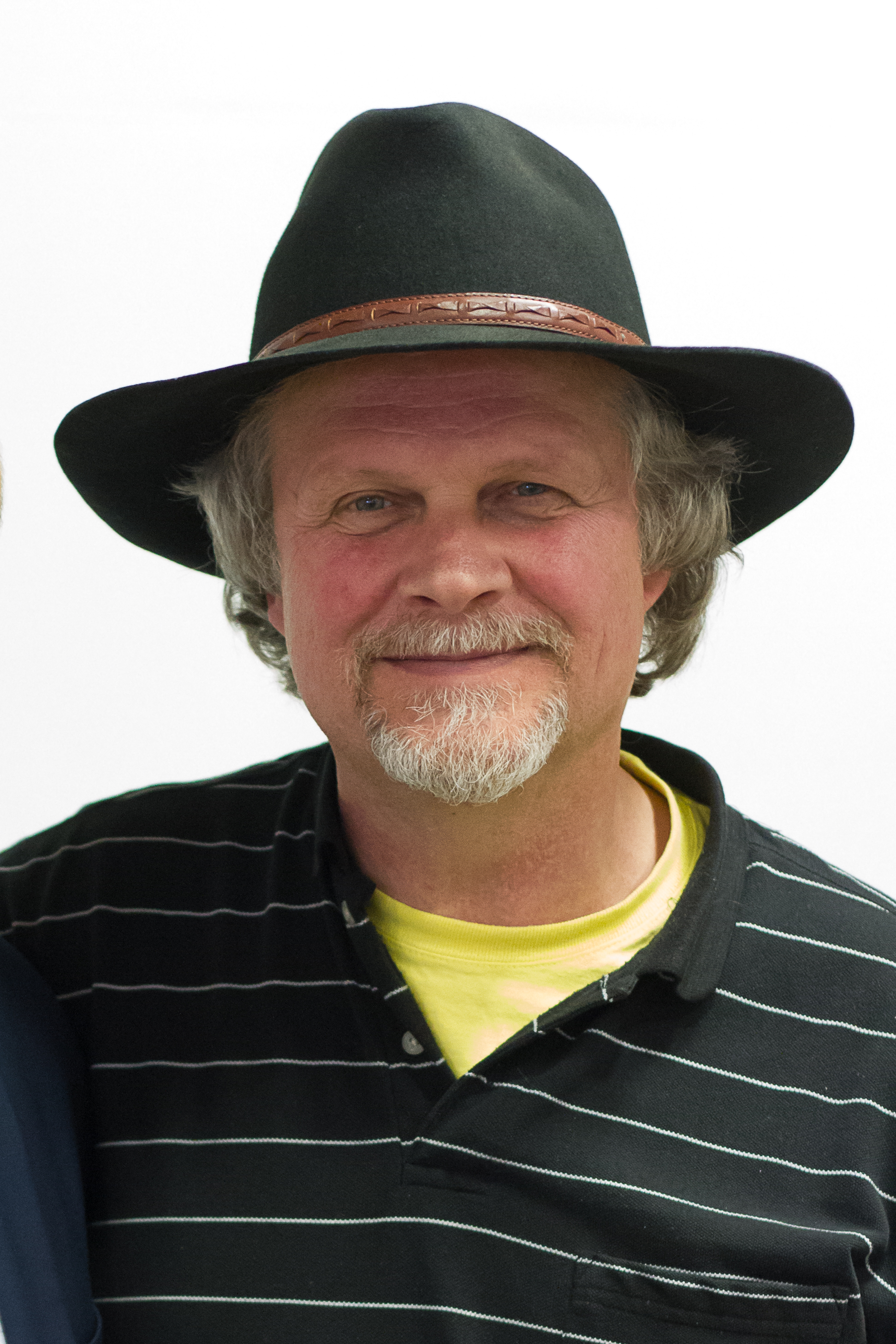
- John Loftus at SASHAcon 2016 at the University of Missouri
- Born: September 18, 1954 (age 71)
- Education: Great Lakes Christian College; Lincoln Christian University; Trinity Evangelical Divinity School
- Occupation: Author
- Writing career
- Subject: Atheism
- Website: www.debunking-christianity.com

John Wayne Loftus (born September 18, 1954) is an American atheist author. He has written five books, and edited seven others.

== Early life and education ==
Loftus was born on September 18, 1954. He earned a bachelor's degree from Great Lakes Christian College in 1977, Master of Arts and Master of Divinity degrees from Lincoln Christian Seminary in 1982, and a Master of Theology degree from Trinity Evangelical Divinity School in 1985. He dropped out of a Doctor of Philosophy program in theology and ethics at Marquette University in 1987.

== Career ==
Loftus was a minister and taught apologetics, philosophy, critical thinking, and ethics at several colleges, including The College of Lake County, Grayslake, IL, Lincoln Christian University, Lincoln, IL, Great Lakes Christian College, Lansing, MI, and Trine University, Angola, IN. In the mid 1990s, in light of an extramarital affair, Loftus had a crisis of faith and eventually rejected Christianity.

As of November 2021, Loftus has authored and edited twelve books: The Christian Delusion (2010), The End of Christianity (2011), Why I Became an Atheist (2012), The Outsider Test of Faith: How to Know Which Religion Is True (2013), God or Godless (2013, co-written with Randal Rauser), Christianity Is Not Great (2014), How to Defend the Christian Faith: Advice from an Atheist (2015), Christianity in the Light of Science (2016), UnApologetic: Why Philosophy of Religion Must End (2016), and The Case against Miracles (2019). He edited an anthology, God and Horrendous Suffering (2021). He co-edited, with Robert M. Price, an anthology by prominent contemporary English-speaking mythicists, Varieties of Jesus Mythicism: Did He Even Exist? (2021).

== The Outsider Test for Faith ==
In his book The Outsider Test For Faith, Loftus asks believers to test their religious faith as an outsider: "The best way to test one’s adopted religious faith is from the perspective of an outsider with no double standards, using the same level of skepticism one uses to evaluate other religious faiths." "It is no different than the prince in the Cinderella story who must question forty-five thousand people to see which girl lost the glass slipper at the ball the previous night. They all claim to have done so. Therefore, skepticism is definitely warranted when approaching any woman who claims to have the right foot fit."

This test has been disputed by Norman Geisler in "From Apologist to Atheist: A Critical Review", Thomas Talbott in "The Outsider Test for Faith: How Serious a Challenge Is It?", Mark Hanna, Biblical Christianity: Truth or Delusion? Matthew Flannagan, "A Review of the Christian Delusion", and David Marshall, How Jesus Passes the Outsider Test: The Inside Story.

== Bibliography ==
- Loftus, John W., ed. (2010). The Christian Delusion. Amherst, NY: Prometheus Books. ISBN 9781616141684.
- Loftus, John W., ed. (2011). The End of Christianity. Amherst, NY: Prometheus Books. ISBN 9781616144142.
- Loftus, John W. (2012). Why I Became an Atheist (2012 rev. ed.). Amherst, NY: Prometheus Books. ISBN 9781616145781.
- Loftus, John W. (2013). The Outsider Test for Faith: How to Know Which Religion Is True. Amherst, NY: Prometheus Books. ISBN 9781616147389.
- Loftus, John W.; Rauser, Randal (2013). God or Godless?: One Atheist. One Christian. Twenty Controversial Questions. Grand Rapids, MI: Baker Books. ISBN 978-0801015281.
- Loftus, John W., ed. (2014). Christianity Is Not Great: How Faith Fails (2nd ed.). Amherst, NY: Prometheus Books.
- Loftus, John W. (2015). How to Defend the Christian Faith: Advice from an Atheist. Durham, NC: Pitchstone Publishing.
- Loftus, John W., ed. (2016). Christianity in the Light of Science: Critically Examining the World's Largest Religion. Amherst, NY: Prometheus Books. ISBN 9781633881730.
- Loftus, John W. (2016). UnApologetic: Why Philosophy of Religion Must End. Durham, NC: Pitchstone Publishing. ISBN 9781634310987.
- Loftus, John W., ed. (2019). The Case against Miracles. Hypatia Press. ISBN 9781839190087.
- Loftus, John W., ed. (2021). God and Horrendous Suffering. Denver, CO: GCRR Press. ISBN 97817378469-1-8.
- Loftus, John W.; Price, Robert M., eds. (2021). Varieties of Jesus Mythicism: Did He Even Exist?. Hypatia Press. ISBN 978-1839191589.
