= When I Pray for You =

Promotional single by Dan + Shay

from the album The Shack: Music From and Inspired by the Original Motion Picture
- Released: February 3, 2017
- Genre: Christian country
- Length: 3:29
- Label: Atlantic
- Songwriter(s): Shay Mooney; Dan Smyers; Justin Ebach; Jon Nite
- Producer(s): Scott Hendricks; Scott Johnson; Dan Smyers

"When I Pray for You" is a song recorded by American country music duo Dan + Shay for the soundtrack to the 2017 drama film, The Shack. Written by group members Shay Mooney and Dan Smyers with Justin Ebach and Jon Nite, the song is told from the perspective of a father-to-be and describes the unconditional love a parent feels for their child. Smyers also co-produced the track with Scott Hendricks and Scott Johnson. It was released February 3, 2017 through Atlantic Records as the soundtrack's third promotional single. It was expected to impact country radio in late February 2017, however this release did not materialize.

Upon its release, the song was the highest-selling track in the Christian music genre for the week and debuted at number 3 on the Billboard Christian Songs chart in the group's first appearance. It also entered in the top 40 of the Hot Country Songs chart.

== Background and recording ==
In October 2016, Shay Mooney announced that he and his then-fiancée, Hannah Billingsley, were expecting their first child. Inspired by the emotions revolving around his pending fatherhood, Mooney set out to write a song about his experience with group mate Dan Smyers and two of their songwriter friends, Justin Ebach and Jon Nite. Smyers described "When I Pray for You", the result of this writing session, as "one of the most special songs we've ever written," in a press statement. The song's inclusion on the soundtrack for The Shack was called "an honor" by Smyers. "When I Pray for You" is written from the perspective of a soon-to-be-father, who expresses his desire to emulate his father and be a good parent. Mooney and Billingsley welcomed their son, Asher James Mooney, on January 24, 2017, ten days before the song's release.

== Commercial performance ==
"When I Pray for You" debuted at number 39 on the Hot Country Songs chart dated February 25, 2017. It concurrently debuted at number 7 on the Country Digital Song Sales component chart with 13,000 first-week sales. The song also entered both the Christian Digital Song Sales and Christian/Gospel Digital Song Sales charts at number one, marking the group's first appearance on either chart. "When I Pray for You" debuted at number three on the Christian Songs chart dated February 25, 2017. The song also charted on the Christian Airplay component chart due to unsolicited airplay and reached a peak position of 26.

== Music video ==
An official music video premiered on February 3, 2017 accompanying the song's digital release. Filmed in Nashville, Tennessee, the video blends performance shots of the group on a riverbank with clips of the film, "The Shack 2017" Fantasy/Thriller, which stars Sam Worthington, Tim McGraw, and Octavia Spencer. People described the song and its video as a "tear-jerker."

== Credits and personnel ==
Credits adapted from AllMusic.

- Jeff Balding – recording
- Jessica Blackwell – violin
- Matt Coles – engineering
- Charles Dixon – violin
- Kevin Harper – engineering
- Scott Hendricks – production, recording
- Scott Johnson – production
- Charlie Judge – conduction, piano, synthesizer
- Elizabeth Lamb – viola
- Andrew Mendelson – mastering
- Shay Mooney – vocals
- Emily Nelson – cello
- Justin Niebank – mixing
- Russ Pahl – pedal steel guitar
- Jimmie Lee Sloas – bass guitar
- Dan Smyers – vocals, production
- Bryan Sutton – acoustic guitar, mandolin
- Derek Wells – electric guitar
- Nir "Z" Zidkyahu – drums, programming

== Charts ==
Chart (2017)	Peak position
US Christian Airplay (Billboard)	26
US Hot Christian Songs (Billboard)	3
US Hot Country Songs (Billboard)	39
