= Exam (2009 film) =

- Theatrical poster
- Directed by: Stuart Hazeldine
- Written by: Stuart Hazeldine
- Story by: Stuart Hazeldine; Simon Garrity
- Produced by: Stuart Hazeldine; Gareth Unwin
- Starring: Adar Beck; Gemma Chan; Nathalie Cox; John Lloyd Fillingham; Chuk Iwuji; Pollyanna McIntosh; Luke Mably; Jimi Mistry; Colin Salmon
- Cinematography: Tim Wooster
- Edited by: Mark Talbot-Butler
- Music by: Stephen Barton; Matthew Cracknell
- Production companies: Hazeldine Films; Bedlam Productions
- Distributed by: IFC Films; Independent
- Release dates: June 2009 (EIFF); 8 January 2010 (United Kingdom)
- Running time: 97 minutes
- Country: United Kingdom
- Language: English
- Budget: $600,000
- Box office: $394,717

Exam is a 2009 British psychological thriller film produced, written and directed by Stuart Hazeldine and starring Colin Salmon, Chris Carey, Jimi Mistry, Luke Mably, Gemma Chan, Chukwudi Iwuji, John Lloyd Fillingham, Pollyanna McIntosh, Adar Beck and Nathalie Cox. The film was first premiered in June 2009 at the Edinburgh International Film Festival (EIFF) before opening to theatrical release on 8 January 2010.

In the film, eight candidates for a highly desirable corporate job are locked together in an exam room and given a final test with one seemingly simple question. However, confusion soon ensues and tensions unravel.

== Plot ==
Eight candidates dress for an employment assessment exam at the company Biorg. The group enters a room and sits at individual desks. Each desk has a paper printed with the word "candidate" and a number from one to eight. The Invigilator explains that they have 80 minutes to answer one question, but there are three rules: the candidates must not spoil their paper, leave the room, or talk to him or the armed guard at the door. If they do, they will be disqualified. The Invigilator asks them if they have any questions, then leaves.

As the exam starts, it turns out that the papers are otherwise blank. Within minutes, Candidate 2 is disqualified for spoiling her paper by writing on it. The seven remaining candidates realize it is permissible to talk to each other and collaborate. One candidate, "White", assigns nicknames to each candidate based on hair color and skin color: Black, Blonde, Brown, Brunette, Dark, and Deaf (for one candidate who does not speak or respond to the group).

In the hour that follows, the candidates use lights, bodily fluids, and fire sprinklers in attempts to reveal hidden text on their papers, to no avail. They speculate on the exam's purpose and the nature of the company. Dark claims that the CEO is highly secretive and has not been seen since the initial public offering. It is gradually revealed that the company is responsible for a miracle drug designed to treat a condition afflicting a large part of the population due to a viral pandemic. In the chaos, White takes control of the group and engineers the disqualifications of Brunette and Deaf for spoiled papers.

White also begins taunting the others, saying he has figured out the question but will not tell them. In response, Black knocks White unconscious and ties him to a chair. As White passes out, he pleads for his medication, implying he has the virus. Brown turns his attention to Dark, who demonstrates knowledge of the company's internal workings, and tortures her into revealing that she works for the company. It is revealed that Black is a carrier of the disease. White goes into convulsions; Dark pleads to the Invigilator for help and is disqualified.

Blonde retrieves White's medication, which was stolen from him earlier by Brown, and uses it to revive him. The others release White and demand to know the question. White suggests that there is no question and the company will simply hire the last remaining candidate. Black steals the guard's gun, but it requires the guard's fingerprint to fire, giving White time to retrieve it. By forcing the guard's hand into the trigger, White coerces Brown to leave the room, disqualifying him. As Blonde also exits, she turns off the voice-activated lights, allowing Black to attack White.

The lights come back on after Black is hit by a gunshot. Blonde hides in the hallway, still holding one foot inside the room. Before White can kill her, the exam timer runs to zero. White addresses the Invigilator, sure of his success, but is disqualified. It is revealed that Deaf had earlier removed a few minutes from the countdown clock. Blonde remembers that Deaf had been using glasses and a piece of broken glass with an exam paper earlier. Taking the abandoned glasses, she finds the phrase "Question 1." on the exam paper in minuscule writing. Blonde realizes that Question 1 refers to the only question asked of the group by the Invigilator at the beginning of the test ("Any questions?"). Blonde answers "No."

The Invigilator enters and reveals that Deaf is the CEO of the company. He found the virus cure but also discovered a method of rapid cell regeneration capable of providing "the gift of life". The bullet that hit Black contained this cure, reviving him. With high demand for the drug and a limited supply, the company needed an administrator capable of making tough decisions with attention to detail while showing compassion, all traits that Blonde displayed during the exam. Blonde accepts the job.

== Cast ==
- John Lloyd Fillingham as Candidate 1, Deaf
- Gemma Chan as Candidate 2
- Adar Beck as Candidate 3, Dark
- Pollyanna McIntosh as Candidate 4, Brunette
- Luke Mably as Candidate 5, White
- Jimi Mistry as Candidate 6, Brown
- Nathalie Cox as Candidate 7, Blonde
- Chukwudi Iwuji as Candidate 8, Black
- Colin Salmon as The Invigilator
- Chris Carey as The Guard

== Production ==
After seeing some of his friends' films fail due to studio interference, Stuart Hazeldine decided that he wanted full control over his feature debut. The original story involved an exam at a school, but Stuart Hazeldine changed it to be a job interview. The ending is also Hazeldine's creation, as the original story didn't have one. Hazeldine wanted to separate the characters by race, culture, gender, and, especially, worldview. The film's pandemic was influenced by contemporary fears of bird flu and distrust of pharmaceutical companies. Originally, the script had more science fiction elements, but Hazeldine stripped them out to keep the film grounded. About the twist ending, Hazeldine said he wanted the film to be about more than just the twist, and he tried to appeal to audiences who seek a story about human nature.

== Release ==
The film premiered in June 2009 as part of the Edinburgh Film Festival and was then part of the Raindance Film Festival 2009. It was released in UK cinemas on 8 January 2010.

On 11 February 2010, IFC Films acquired the rights for the US release, where it was released as part of the Santa Barbara International Film Festival. The DVD and Blu-ray were released in the UK on 7 June 2010. There was no theatrical release in the US, but IFC Films released the film via video on demand on 23 July 2010 and on DVD on 16 November 2010.

On 4 September 2012, a stage adaptation of the film opened in Manchester.

== Reception ==
On the review aggregator website Rotten Tomatoes, 62% of 29 critics' reviews are positive, with an average rating of 5.8/10. Tim Robey of The Telegraph said that the film starts off well but loses its way. Lael Loewenstein of Variety called it "a smartly conceived, tautly executed psychological thriller." Philip French of The Guardian called the film clever and "ingeniously developed" but criticised the ending as disappointing. Also writing in the Guardian, Peter Bradshaw gave the film two out of five stars and said the film does not live up to its intriguing premise. Awarding the film four out of five stars, Total Film compared the film to Cube and the work of Jean-Paul Sartre. Becky Reed of Screen Geek compared it to 12 Angry Men and El Método (The Method), a 2005 Spanish film.

=== Awards ===
- Won the Independent Feature Award at Santa Barbara Film Fest.
- Won the Bronze Hitchcock at the Dinard British Film Festival
- Nominated for Best UK Feature at Raindance.
- Nominated for a BAFTA for Outstanding Debut.
