= The Shack (Young novel) =

Christian novel by William P. Young

- Author: William P Young
- Cover artist: Dave Aldrich
- Language: English
- Genre: Fiction
- Publisher: Windblown Media, FaithWords, Hodder & Stoughton
- Publication date: May 2007
- Publication place: United States
- Media type: Print, e-book, audiobook
- Pages: 256 pp
- ISBN: 0-9647292-3-7
- OCLC: 166263178
- Website: http://theshackbook.com/

The Shack is a novel by Canadian author William P. Young that was published in 2007.

The novel was self-published but became a USA Today bestseller, having sold 1 million copies as of June 8, 2008. It was the No. 1 paperback trade fiction seller on The New York Times Best Seller list from June 2008 to early 2010, in a publishing partnership with Hachette Book Group USA's FaithWords imprint (Hodder & Stoughton in the UK). In 2009 it was awarded the "Diamond Award" for sales of over 10 million copies by the Evangelical Christian Publishers Association.

The title of the book is a metaphor for "the house you build out of your own pain", as Young explained in a telephone interview. He also told radio host talk show Drew Marshall that The Shack "is a metaphor for the places you get stuck, you get hurt, you get damaged ... where shame or hurt is centered."

== Plot ==
The novel is set in the American Northwest. The main character is Mackenzie Allen Phillips, a father of five called "Mack" by his family and friends. Four years prior to the main events of the story, Mack takes three of his children on a camping trip to Wallowa Lake near Joseph, Oregon, stopping at Multnomah Falls on the way. Two of his children are playing in a canoe when it flips and almost drowns Mack's son. Mack is able to save his son by rushing into the water and freeing him from the canoe's webbing but unintentionally leaves his youngest daughter Missy alone at their campsite. After Mack returns, he sees that Missy is missing. The police are called, and the family discovers that Missy has been abducted and murdered by a serial killer known as the "Little Ladykiller". The police find an abandoned shack in the woods where Missy was taken: Her bloodied clothing is found, but her body is not located. Mack's life sinks into what he calls, "The Great Sadness".

As the novel begins, Mack receives a note in his mailbox from "Papa", saying that he would like to meet with Mack that coming weekend at the shack. Mack is puzzled by the note—he has had no relationship with his abusive father since he left home at age 13. He suspects that the note may be from God, whom his wife Nan lovingly refers to as "Papa".

Mack's family leaves to visit relatives and he goes alone to the shack, unsure of what he will see there. He arrives and initially finds nothing, but as he is leaving, the shack and its surroundings are supernaturally transformed into a lush and inviting scene. He enters the shack and encounters manifestations of the three persons of the Trinity: God the Father takes the form of an African American woman who calls herself Elousia and Papa; God the Son, Jesus, is a Middle Eastern carpenter; and the Holy Spirit physically manifests as an Asian woman named Sarayu.

The bulk of the book narrates Mack's conversations with Papa, Jesus, and Sarayu as he comes to terms with Missy's death and his relationship with the three of them. Mack also has various experiences with each of them. Mack walks across a lake with Jesus, sees an image of his (earthly) father in Heaven with Sarayu, and has a conversation with Sophia, the personification of God's wisdom. At the end of his visit, Mack goes on a hike with Papa, now appearing as an older Native American male, who shows him where Missy's body was left in a cave.

After spending the weekend at the shack, Mack leaves and is so preoccupied with his joyous thoughts that he is nearly killed in an automobile accident. During recovery he realizes that he did not in fact spend the weekend at the shack, but that his accident occurred on the same day that he arrived at the shack. He also leads the police to the cave that Papa revealed, and they find Missy's body still lying there. With the help of forensic evidence discovered at the scene, the Little Ladykiller is arrested and put on trial.

== Publication ==
Young originally wrote The Shack as a Christmas gift for his six children with no apparent intention of publishing it. After letting several friends read the book he was urged to publish it for the general public. In 2006, Young worked with Wayne Jacobsen, Brad Cummings (both former pastors from Los Angeles) and Bobby Downes (filmmaker) to bring the book to publication after a period of sixteen months and four rewrites. They had no success with either religious or secular publishers, so they formed Windblown Media for the purpose of publishing the book. The Shack achieved its No. 1 best selling success via word-of-mouth and with the help of a USD$300.00 website; it is often reported that nothing else had been spent on marketing up to September 2007. Additional startup funds were supplied by Brad Cummings, president of Windblown Media, who spent the maximum credit limit on 12 personal credit cards in order to publish the book.

== Reception ==
The Shack went largely unnoticed for over a year after its initial publication, but suddenly became a very popular seller in mid-2008, when it debuted at No. 1 on The New York Times paperback fiction best seller list on June 8. Its success was the result of a "word-of-mouth, church-to-church, blog-to-blog campaign" by Young, Jacobsen and Cummings in churches and Christian-themed radio, websites, and blogs.

As of May 2010, The Shack had over 10 million copies in print, and had been at No. 1 on The New York Times best seller list for 70 weeks. The Shack was also released in hardcover, and translated into Spanish as La Cabaña. In June 2009 a German translation with the title Die Hütte – ein Wochenende mit Gott (The Hut – a Weekend with God) was released. It was also translated into Croatian as Koliba and became very popular in Croatia and also in Bosnia and Herzegovina. The book was also translated into Polish as Chata and published in 2009. There were re-editions in 2011 and 2017 due to its popularity.

However, former Mars Hill Church pastor Mark Driscoll criticized The Shack, saying that "it misrepresents God" and called William P. Young "a heretic". Evangelical author Chuck Colson wrote a review, called "Stay Out of The Shack", in which he criticizes the attribution of "silly lines" to characters representing the three Persons of the Trinity, and the author's "low view of scripture". R. Albert Mohler Jr. called The Shack "deeply troubling" on his radio show, saying that it "includes undiluted heresy". Apologists author Norman Geisler and William C. Roach published a critique in 2012 detailing their 14 points of theological disagreement with the book (including "unorthodox", "false", "classic heresy", "non-rational", "psychologically helpful ... doctrinally harmful", and "very dangerous").

Pastor Sean Cole of the Emmanuel Baptist Church in Sterling, Colorado, offered yet another critique appearing in Pulpit and Pen. He provides six major arguments against the content of the book and Young's portrayal of the Trinity, and offers them as major problems.

Theologian Randal Rauser has written a generally sympathetic guide to The Shack in his companion volume Finding God in the Shack (Paternoster, 2009). In the book Rauser responds to many of the objections raised by critics such as Colson and Mohler. Brad Robison, a psychiatrist and family therapist who used The Shack in his practice, wrote The Shack Study Guide (Windblown Media, 2016) to assist his patients on their healing journey. It is co-authored by William P. Young. Wayne Jacobsen, one of Young's early collaborators, wrote a detailed response to several common points of criticism. His column "Is The Shack Heresy?" was published online by Windblown Media.

== Legal dispute ==
In July 2010, the Los Angeles Times reported that The Shack had "spawned a tangle of lawsuits over royalties and even the book's authorship". Young said that he was owed $8 million in royalties, Jacobsen and Cummings filed a suit against Young, Young asked the court to dismiss or stay the claims, and Jacobsen and Cummings responded. Hachette, the commercial publisher involved, asked the court to determine to whom it should pay royalties from the book. On January 10, 2011, the court declared that it had been advised that the case between Young et al. and Jacobsen et al. "has been settled or is in the process of being settled" and the case was dismissed.

== Film adaptation ==
A film adaptation of The Shack, directed by Stuart Hazeldine and starring Sam Worthington, Octavia Spencer, and Tim McGraw, was released on March 3, 2017, to negative critical reviews. Audience response was more positive.

== References in other works ==
The Shack was referred to by Stephen King in his 2010 title Full Dark, No Stars, which is a compilation of four novellas. In the final novella, A Good Marriage, the protagonist recalls that her husband recommended she read The Shack and he said the novel was "a life-changer".

It is also cited in the introduction to Richard Rohr and Mike Morrell's The Divine Dance for encouraging people thinking about the Trinity again.
