= Matt Aitken (special effects artist) =

New Zealand visual effects artist

- Occupation: Visual effects artist
- Years active: 1995-present

Matt Aitken is a special effects artist.

He was nominated at the 82nd Academy Awards for his work on the film District 9. His nomination was shared with Robert Habros, Dan Kaufman, and Peter Muyzers. In 2020, he received his second Academy Award nomination for Best Visual Effects on 2019 film, Avengers: Endgame, at the 92nd Academy Awards. His nomination was shared with Dan DeLeeuw, Russell Earl, and Dan Sudick.

== Selected filmography ==
Year	Title	Distributor
1996	The Frighteners	Universal Pictures
1997	Contact	Warner Bros. Pictures
2001	The Lord of the Rings: The Fellowship of the Ring	New Line Cinema
2002	The Lord of the Rings: The Two Towers	New Line Cinema
2003	The Lord of the Rings: The Return of the King	New Line Cinema
2004	I, Robot	20th Century Fox
2005	King Kong	Universal Pictures
2006	X-Men: The Last Stand	20th Century Fox
2007	Bridge to Terabithia	Buena Vista Pictures
2009	Avatar	20th Century Fox
2009	District 9	Sony Pictures
2011	The Adventures of Tintin: The Secret of the Unicorn	Paramount Pictures
2012	The Hobbit: An Unexpected Journey	Warner Bros. Pictures
2013	The Hobbit: The Desolation of Smaug	Warner Bros. Pictures
2013	Iron Man 3	Walt Disney Studios Motion Pictures
2014	The Hobbit: The Battle of the Five Armies	Warner Bros. Pictures
2016	Independence Day: Resurgence	20th Century Fox
2019	Avengers: Endgame	Walt Disney Studios Motion Pictures

== Awards and nominations ==
Year	Award	Category	Nominated work	Result
2003	Visual Effects Society Awards	Best Models and Miniatures in a Motion Picture	The Lord of the Rings: The Two Towers	Won
2006	Visual Effects Society Awards	Outstanding Created Environment in a Live Action Motion Picture	King Kong "New York dawn attack" scene	Won
2010	Academy Awards	Best Visual Effects	District 9	Nominated
2010	Saturn Awards	Best Special Effects	District 9	Nominated
2010	British Academy Film Awards	Best Special Visual Effects	District 9	Nominated
2010	Gold Derby Awards	Visual Effects	District 9	Nominated
2011	Visual Effects Society Awards	Outstanding Visual Effects in a Special Venue Project	King Kong: 360 3-D	Won
2012	Saturn Awards	Best Special Effects	The Adventures of Tintin	Nominated
2012	Visual Effects Society Awards	Outstanding Virtual Cinematography in an Animated Feature Motion Picture	The Adventures of Tintin	Nominated
2012	Visual Effects Society Awards	Outstanding Created Environment in an Animated Feature Motion Picture	The Adventures of Tintin	Nominated
2013	Visual Effects Society Awards	Outstanding Virtual Cinematography in a Live Action Feature Motion Picture	The Hobbit: An Unexpected Journey	Won
2013	Hollywood Post Alliance Awards	Outstanding Visual Effects – Feature Film	Iron Man 3	Nominated
2015	Hollywood Post Alliance Awards	Outstanding Visual Effects – Feature Film	The Hobbit: The Battle of the Five Armies	Won
2018	Hollywood Professional Association Awards	Outstanding Visual Effects – Feature Film	Avengers: Infinity War	Won
2019	Visual Effects Society Awards	Outstanding Visual Effects in a Photoreal Feature	Avengers: Infinity War	Won
2019	Saturn Awards	Best Special Effects	Avengers: Endgame	Won
2019	Satellite Awards	Best Visual Effects	Avengers: Endgame	Nominated
2019	Hollywood Professional Association Awards	Outstanding Visual Effects – Feature Film	Avengers: Endgame	Nominated
2019	Seattle Film Critics Society Awards	Best Visual Effects	Avengers: Endgame	Nominated
2020	Academy Awards	Best Visual Effects	Avengers: Endgame	Nominated
2020	British Academy Film Awards	Best Special Visual Effects	Avengers: Endgame	Nominated
2020	Visual Effects Society Awards	Outstanding Visual Effects in a Photoreal Feature	Avengers: Endgame	Nominated
2020	Gold Derby Awards	Visual Effects	Avengers: Endgame	Won
2020	Gold Derby Awards	Visual Effects of the Decade	Avengers: Endgame	Nominated
2020	Hollywood Critics Association Film Awards	Best Visual Effects	Avengers: Endgame	Won
2022	Satellite Awards	Best Visual Effects	Eternals	Nominated
2022	Gold Derby Awards	Visual Effects	Eternals	Nominated
2022	Hollywood Critics Association Film Awards	Best Visual Effects	Eternals	Nominated
2023	Hollywood Professional Association Awards	Outstanding Visual Effects – Feature Film	Transformers: Rise of the Beasts	Nominated
2024	Satellite Awards	Best Visual Effects	Transformers: Rise of the Beasts	Nominated
