= Robert Habros =

Visual effects artist

- Other name: Bob Habros
- Occupation: Visual effects artist
- Years active: 1986-present

Robert Habros is a special effects artist who was nominated at the 82nd Academy Awards for his work on the film District 9. His nomination was shared with Matt Aitken, Dan Kaufman and Peter Muyzers.

He also worked on TV shows such as Stargate SG-1 and Fringe.

== Selected filmography ==
- SpaceCamp (1986)
- Bill & Ted's Excellent Adventure (1989)
- A Gnome Named Gnorm (1990)
- Spaced Invaders (1990)
- Suburban Commando (1991)
- Honey, I Blew Up the Kid (1992)
- Teenage Mutant Ninja Turtles III (1993)
- District 9 (2009)
- Chronicle (2012)
