= Peter Muyzers =

Special effects artist

- Occupation: Visual effects artist
- Years active: 1997–present

Peter Muyzers is a special effects artist. He was nominated at the 82nd Academy Awards for his work on the film District 9. His nomination was shared with Matt Aitken, Robert Habros and Dan Kaufman

== Selected filmography ==
- Harry Potter and the Sorcerer's Stone (2001)
- Harry Potter and the Chamber of Secrets (2002)
- Harry Potter and the Prisoner of Azkaban (2004)
- Troy (2004)
- Wallace & Gromit: The Curse of the Were-Rabbit (2005)
- Fantastic Four: Rise of the Silver Surfer (2007)
- Mr. Magorium's Wonder Emporium (2007)
- The Incredible Hulk (2008)
- District 9 (2009)
- Elysium (2013)
