= Dan Kaufman =

American visual effects artist

- Occupation: Visual effects artist
- Years active: 1995-present

Dan Kaufman is a visual effects artist who has worked on films such as District 9 and X-Men: The Last Stand.

At the 82nd Academy Awards, he was nominated for Best Visual Effects for the film District 9. His nomination was shared with Matt Aitken, Robert Habros, and Peter Muyzers.

== Selected filmography ==
- Percy Jackson: Sea of Monsters (2013)
- District 9 (2009)
- Poseidon (2006)
- X-Men: The Last Stand (2006)
- The Haunted Mansion (2003)
- The Matrix Revolutions (2003)
- What Lies Beneath (2000)
