= William P. Young =

Canadian Christian author (born 1955)

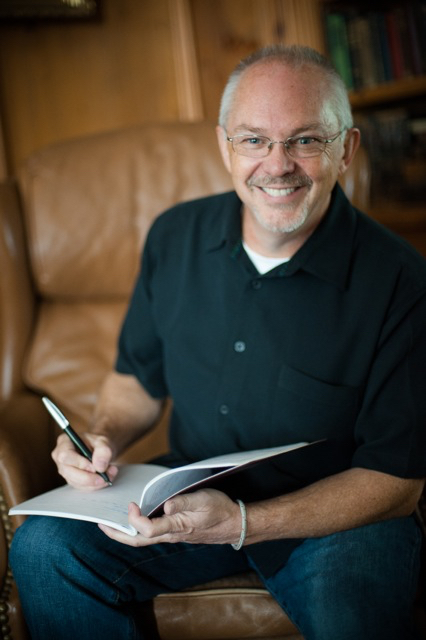
- Young in 2015
- Born: William Paul Young; May 11, 1955 (age 71); Grande Prairie, Alberta, Canada
- Occupations: Novelist, author
- Writing career
- Language: English
- Notable works: The Shack; Cross Roads; Eve
- Website: wmpaulyoung.com

William Paul Young (born May 11, 1955) is a Canadian author. He wrote the religious books The Shack, Cross Roads, Eve, and Lies We Believe About God.

== Early life ==
Young is the oldest of four, born May 11, 1955, in Grande Prairie, Alberta, Canada, but the majority of his first decade was lived with his missionary parents in the highlands of Netherlands New Guinea (West Papua), among the Dani, a central highlands people of western New Guinea. These became his family and as the first white child and outsider who ever spoke their language, he was granted unusual access into their culture and community. When he was six he was sent to a boarding school.

== Career ==
Young originally wrote primarily as a way to create unique gifts for his friends, until his wife repeatedly urged him to write something for their six children in order to put down in one place his perspectives on God and on the inner healing Young had experienced as an adult. The resulting manuscript, which later became The Shack, was intended only for his six kids and for a handful of close friends.

Young initially printed just 15 copies of his book. Two of his close friends encouraged him to have it published, and assisted with some editing and rewriting in order to prepare the manuscript for publication. After rejection by 26 publishers, Young and his friends published the book under the name of their newly created publishing company, Windblown Media, in 2007. The company spent only C$200 in advertising; word-of-mouth referrals eventually drove the book to number one on the New York Times trade paperback fiction best-seller list in June 2008. "The Shack" was the top-selling fiction and audio book of 2008 in America through November 30.

Young's second book, Cross Roads, was published on November 13, 2012, by FaithWords.

Young's Eve was released on September 15, 2015, by Howard Books.

Young's latest book, Lies We Believe About God, released March 7, 2017. Like The Shack, it has been the subject of theological criticism.
