= Vancouver Film Critics Circle Awards 2009 =

Annual Canadian film awards ceremony

The winners of the 10th Vancouver Film Critics Circle Awards, honoring the best in filmmaking in 2009, were announced on January 11, 2010.

== Winners and nominees ==
=== International ===
Best Actor: Colin Firth – A Single Man

- George Clooney – Up in the Air
- Jeremy Renner – The Hurt Locker

Best Actress: Carey Mulligan – An Education

- Gabourey Sidibe – Precious
- Meryl Streep – Julie and Julia

Best Director: Kathryn Bigelow – The Hurt Locker

- Jason Reitman – Up in the Air
- Quentin Tarantino – Inglourious Basterds

Best Film: Up in the Air

- A Serious Man
- The Hurt Locker

Best Foreign Language Film: Summer Hours • France

- Broken Embraces • Spain
- The Headless Woman • Argentina

Best Supporting Actor: Christoph Waltz – Inglourious Basterds

- Alfred Molina – An Education
- Stanley Tucci – The Lovely Bones

Best Supporting Actress: Vera Farmiga – Up in the Air

- Anna Kendrick – Up in the Air
- Mo'Nique – Precious

Best Screenplay: Up in the Air - Jason Reitman & Sheldon Turner

- The Hurt Locker - Mark Boal
- Inglourious Basterds - Quentin Tarantino

Best Documentary: Anvil! The Story of Anvil

- The Cove
- Food, Inc

=== Canadian ===
Best Actor: Xavier Dolan – I Killed My Mother (J'ai tué ma mère)

- Sébastien Huberdeau – Polytechnique
- Stephen McHattie – Pontypool

Best Actress: Emily Blunt – The Young Victoria

- Anne Dorval – I Killed My Mother (J'ai tué ma mère)
- Nisreen Faour – Amreeka

Best British Columbia Film: Facing Ali

- A Shine of Rainbows
- Excited

Best Director: Xavier Dolan – I Killed My Mother (J'ai tué ma mère)

- Cherien Dabis – Amreeka
- Denis Villeneuve – Polytechnique

Best Film: I Killed My Mother (J'ai tué ma mère)

- Polytechnique
- The Young Victoria

Best Supporting Actor: François Arnaud – I Killed My Mother (J'ai tué ma mère)

- Daniel J. Gordon – Nurse.Fighter.Boy
- John Paul Tremblay – Trailer Park Boys: Countdown to Liquor Day

Best Supporting Actress: Gabrielle Rose – Excited

- Lisa Houle – Pontypool
- Miranda Richardson – The Young Victoria
