= List of accolades received by The Hurt Locker =

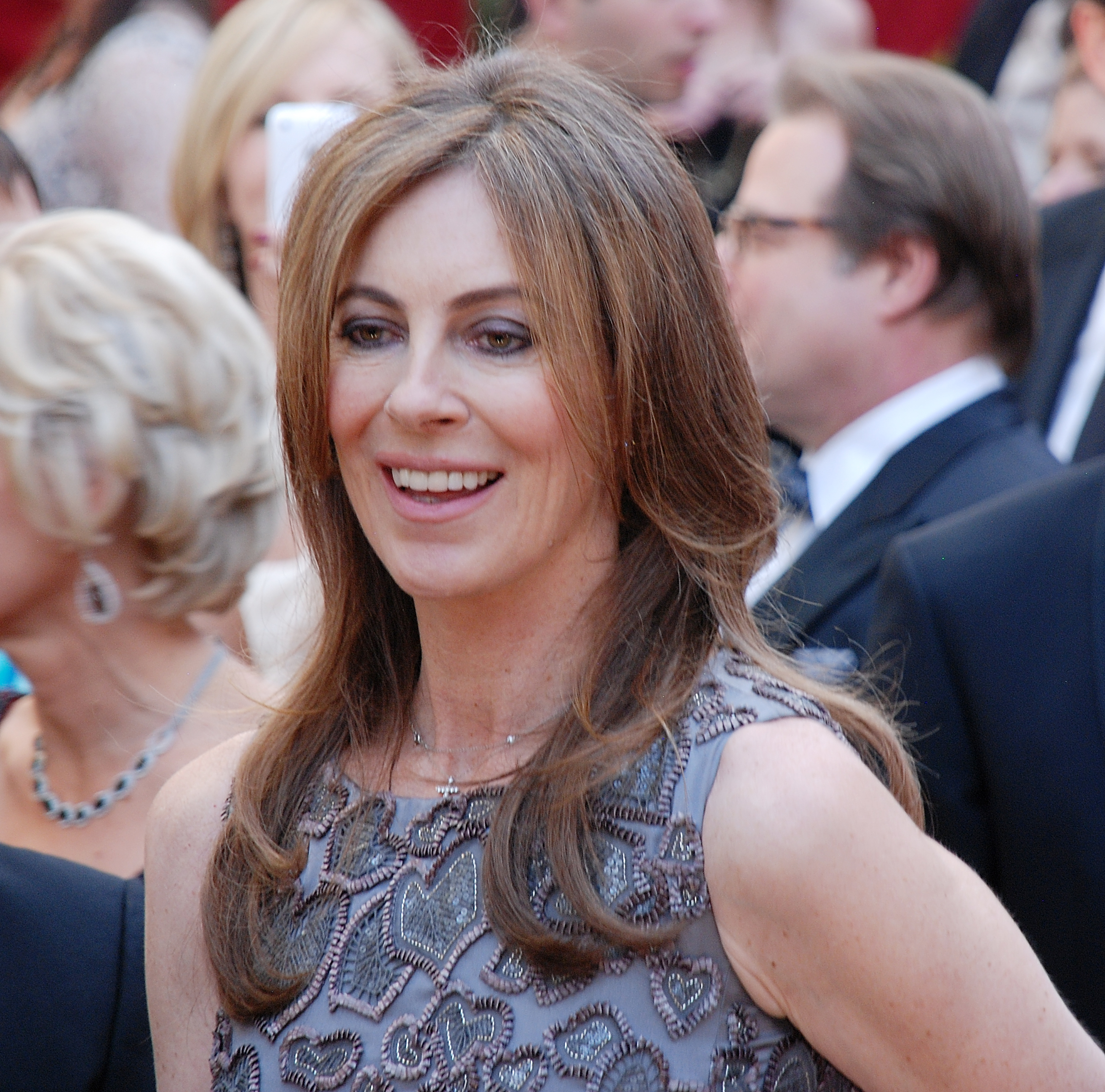
- Kathryn Bigelow, director of The Hurt Locker at the 82nd Academy Awards
Awards & nominations
Award	Won	Nominated
Academy Award	6	9
African-American Film Critics Association	1	1
Alliance of Women Film Journalists	4	4
American Cinema Editors	1	1
American Society of Cinematographers	0	1
Art Directors Guild	1	1
Austin Film Critics Association	3	3
Black Reel Awards	1	1
Boston Society of Film Critics	5	5
British Academy Film Awards	6	8
British Independent Film Awards	0	1
British Society of Cinematographers	1	1
Broadcast Film Critics	2	8
Chicago Film Critics Association	5	5
Cinema Audio Society Awards	1	1
Dallas-Fort Worth Film Critics Association	0	4
Dallas International Film Festival	1	1
Denver Film Critics Society	2	4
Detroit Film Critics Society	0	2
Directors Guild of America Awards	1	1
Empire Awards	0	3
Evening Standard British Film Awards	1	1
Golden Frog	0	1
Golden Globe Awards	0	3
Gotham Independent Film Awards	2	3
Hollywood Film Festival	2	2
Hollywood Post Alliance Awards	0	1
Houston Film Critics Society	3	3
Independent Spirit Awards	0	2
International Cinephile Society Award	1	1
Irish Film and Television Awards	1	1
Kansas City Film Critics Circle	1	1
London Film Critics' Circle	1	2
Los Angeles Film Critics Association	2	2
Motion Picture Sound Editors	0	2
Nantucket Film Festival	1	1
National Board of Review of Motion Pictures	1	1
National Society of Film Critics	3	4
NAACP Image Awards	0	1
New York Film Critics Circle	2	2
New York Online Film Critics	1	1
North Texas Film Critics Association	1	1
Online Film Critics Society	4	7
Palm Springs International Film Festival	1	1
Producers Guild of America Awards	1	1
San Francisco Film Critics Circle	2	2
Santa Barbara International Film Festival	1	1
Satellite Awards	4	5
Saturn Awards	0	2
Screen Actors Guild Awards	0	2
Seattle International Film Festival	1	1
ShoWest Triumph Award	1	1
Southeastern Film Critics Association	1	4
St. Louis Gateway Film Critics Association	1	5
Toronto Film Critics Association	1	2
Utah Film Critics Association	0	2
Vancouver Film Critics Circle	1	4
Venice Film Festival	4	5
Washington DC Area Film Critics Association	2	7
Writers Guild of America	1	1
- Total number of wins and nominations
Totals	90	154
- References

The Hurt Locker is a 2009 Iraq War film written by Mark Boal and directed by Kathryn Bigelow. The film premiered on September 4, 2008, at the 65th Venice International Film Festival, where it competed with The Wrestler for the Golden Lion award. It was released in Italy by Warner Bros. Pictures on October 10, 2008. Following a showing at the 33rd Toronto International Film Festival, Summit Entertainment picked the film up for distribution in the United States. The Hurt Locker was released in the United States on June 26, 2009, with a limited release at four theaters in Los Angeles and New York City. The film grossed over $145,000 on its opening weekend, averaging around $36,000 per theater. The following weekend, beginning July 3, the film grossed over $131,000 at nine theaters. It held the highest per-screen average (Note: The per-screen average is the box office gross for the weekend, divided by the number of screens nationwide that the film was shown on that weekend.) of any movie playing theatrically in the United States for the first two weeks of its release, gradually moving into the top 20 chart. Summit Entertainment then released The Hurt Locker to more screens. The film grossed $49.2 million worldwide, and was a success against its budget of $15 million.

The Hurt Locker has earned various awards and nominations, with the nominations in categories ranging from recognition of the screenplay to its direction and editing to the cast's acting performance. Kathryn Bigelow dominated the Best Director category at the critics' circles. The 67th Golden Globe Awards ceremony saw The Hurt Locker receive three nominations for Best Motion Picture Drama, Director and Screenplay, but it failed to win any. The film garnered nine nominations at the 82nd Academy Awards; the ceremony saw the film come away with six awards, including Best Motion Picture, Director and Original Screenplay. Bigelow became the first woman to win the Academy Award for Best Director and she also became only the fourth woman to be nominated in the category in the history of the awards.

The Hurt Locker received two nominations at the 16th Screen Actors Guild Awards, for Outstanding Performance by a Male Actor for Jeremy Renner and Outstanding Performance by a Cast in a Motion Picture. The film won the Best Theatrical Motion Picture and Outstanding Directorial Achievement at the 21st Producers Guild of America Awards and the 62nd Directors Guild of America Awards respectively. The 35th LA Film Critics Association Awards, 75th NY Film Critics Circle Awards and the 44th National Society of Film Critics Association Awards saw the film win awards for Best Picture and Director. Both the American Film Institute and the Associated Press included The Hurt Locker in their Top Ten Films of 2009 lists. The Associated Press also placed the film at number six on their Top Ten Films of the Decade list.

It became one of the seven films to win Best Picture from three out of four major U.S. film critics' groups (LA, NBR, NY, NSFC) along with Nashville, All the President's Men, Terms of Endearment, Goodfellas, Pulp Fiction, and Drive My Car; and also the first film to win Academy Award for Best Picture since Terms of Endearment.

In 2020, the film was selected for preservation in the National Film Registry by the Library of Congress as being "culturally, historically, or aesthetically significant".

== Awards and nominations ==
Award	Date of ceremony	Category	Recipients	Result
Academy Award	March 7, 2010	Best Picture	Kathryn Bigelow, Mark Boal, Greg Shapiro and Nicolas Chartier	Won
Academy Award	March 7, 2010	Best Director	Kathryn Bigelow	Won
Academy Award	March 7, 2010	Best Actor	Jeremy Renner	Nominated
Academy Award	March 7, 2010	Best Original Screenplay	Mark Boal	Won
Academy Award	March 7, 2010	Best Cinematography	Barry Ackroyd	Nominated
Academy Award	March 7, 2010	Best Film Editing	Chris Innis and Bob Murawski	Won
Academy Award	March 7, 2010	Best Original Score	Marco Beltrami and Buck Sanders	Nominated
Academy Award	March 7, 2010	Best Sound Editing	Paul N. J. Ottosson	Won
Academy Award	March 7, 2010	Best Sound Mixing	Paul N. J. Ottosson and Ray Beckett	Won
African-American Film Critics Association	December 14, 2009	Best Supporting Actor	Anthony Mackie	Won
Alliance of Women Film Journalists	December 15, 2009	Best Picture	The Hurt Locker	Won
Alliance of Women Film Journalists	December 15, 2009	Best Director	Kathryn Bigelow	Won
Alliance of Women Film Journalists	December 15, 2009	Best Woman Director	Kathryn Bigelow	Won
Alliance of Women Film Journalists	December 15, 2009	Best Ensemble	The Hurt Locker	Won
American Cinema Editors	February 14, 2010	Best Edited Feature Film - Dramatic	Chris Innis; Bob Murawski	Won
American Society of Cinematographers	February 27, 2010	Outstanding Achievement in Cinematography in Theatrical Releases	Barry Ackroyd	Nominated
Art Directors Guild	February 13, 2010	Excellence in Production Design for a Contemporary Film	Karl Juliusson	Won
Austin Film Critics Association	December 15, 2009	Best Picture	The Hurt Locker	Won
Austin Film Critics Association	December 15, 2009	Best Director	Kathryn Bigelow	Won
Austin Film Critics Association	December 15, 2009	Best Cinematography	Barry Ackroyd	Won
Black Reel Awards	February 13, 2010	Best Supporting Actor	Anthony Mackie	Won
Boston Society of Film Critics	December 13, 2009	Best Film	The Hurt Locker	Won
Boston Society of Film Critics	December 13, 2009	Best Director	Kathryn Bigelow	Won
Boston Society of Film Critics	December 13, 2009	Best Actor	Jeremy Renner	Won
Boston Society of Film Critics	December 13, 2009	Best Cinematography	Barry Ackroyd	Won
Boston Society of Film Critics	December 13, 2009	Best Film Editing	Chris Innis; Bob Murawski	Won
British Academy Film Awards	February 21, 2010	Best Film	Kathryn Bigelow, Mark Boal, Greg Shapiro, Nicolas Chartier	Won
British Academy Film Awards	February 21, 2010	Best Director	Kathryn Bigelow	Won
British Academy Film Awards	February 21, 2010	Best Original Screenplay	Mark Boal	Won
British Academy Film Awards	February 21, 2010	Best Actor	Jeremy Renner	Nominated
British Academy Film Awards	February 21, 2010	Best Cinematography	Barry Ackroyd	Won
British Academy Film Awards	February 21, 2010	Best Editing	Chris Innis; Bob Murawski	Won
British Academy Film Awards	February 21, 2010	Best Sound	Ray Beckett, Paul N. J. Ottosson, Craig Stauffer	Won
British Academy Film Awards	February 21, 2010	Best Special Visual Effects	Richard Stutsman	Nominated
British Independent Film Awards	December 6, 2010	Best Foreign Film	The Hurt Locker	Nominated
British Society of Cinematographers	July 18, 2010	Best Cinematography	Barry Ackroyd	Won
Broadcast Film Critics	January 15, 2010	Best Picture	The Hurt Locker	Won
Broadcast Film Critics	January 15, 2010	Best Director	Kathryn Bigelow	Won
Broadcast Film Critics	January 15, 2010	Best Original Screenplay	Mark Boal	Nominated
Broadcast Film Critics	January 15, 2010	Best Actor	Jeremy Renner	Nominated
Broadcast Film Critics	January 15, 2010	Best Cinematography	Barry Ackroyd	Nominated
Broadcast Film Critics	January 15, 2010	Best Editing	Chris Innis; Bob Murawski	Nominated
Broadcast Film Critics	January 15, 2010	Best Sound	Ray Beckett, Paul Ottosson	Nominated
Broadcast Film Critics	January 15, 2010	Best Action Film	The Hurt Locker	Nominated
Chicago Film Critics Association	December 21, 2009	Best Picture	The Hurt Locker	Won
Chicago Film Critics Association	December 21, 2009	Best Director	Kathryn Bigelow	Won
Chicago Film Critics Association	December 21, 2009	Best Original Screenplay	Mark Boal	Won
Chicago Film Critics Association	December 21, 2009	Best Actor	Jeremy Renner	Won
Chicago Film Critics Association	December 21, 2009	Best Cinematography	Barry Ackroyd	Won
Cinema Audio Society Awards	February 27, 2010	Outstanding Achievement in Sound Mixing for Motion Pictures	Paul N.J. Ottosson, Ray Beckett	Won
Dallas-Fort Worth Film Critics Association	December 16, 2009	Best Picture	The Hurt Locker	Nominated
Dallas-Fort Worth Film Critics Association	December 16, 2009	Best Director	Kathryn Bigelow	Nominated
Dallas-Fort Worth Film Critics Association	December 16, 2009	Best Actor	Jeremy Renner	Nominated
Dallas-Fort Worth Film Critics Association	December 16, 2009	Best Cinematography	Barry Ackroyd	Nominated
Dallas International Film Festival	March 26, 2009	Dallas Star Award	Kathryn Bigelow	Won
Denver Film Critics Society	January 24, 2010	Best Film	The Hurt Locker	Won
Denver Film Critics Society	January 24, 2010	Best Director	Kathryn Bigelow	Won
Denver Film Critics Society	January 24, 2010	Best Original Screenplay	Mark Boal	Nominated
Denver Film Critics Society	January 24, 2010	Best Acting Ensemble	The Hurt Locker	Nominated
Detroit Film Critics Society	December 11, 2009	Best Film	The Hurt Locker	Nominated
Detroit Film Critics Society	December 11, 2009	Best Director	Kathryn Bigelow	Nominated
Directors Guild of America Awards	January 30, 2010	Outstanding Directorial Achievement in Motion Pictures	Kathryn Bigelow	Won
Empire Awards	March 28, 2010	Best Film	The Hurt Locker	Nominated
Empire Awards	March 28, 2010	Best Director	Kathryn Bigelow	Nominated
Empire Awards	March 28, 2010	Best Thriller	The Hurt Locker	Nominated
Evening Standard British Film Awards	February 8, 2010	Best Technical Achievement	Barry Ackroyd	Won
Golden Frog	November 29, 2008	Best Cinematography	Barry Ackroyd	Nominated
Golden Globe Awards	January 17, 2010	Best Director	Kathryn Bigelow	Nominated
Golden Globe Awards	January 17, 2010	Best Motion Picture - Drama	The Hurt Locker	Nominated
Golden Globe Awards	January 17, 2010	Best Screenplay	Mark Boal	Nominated
Gotham Independent Film Awards	November 30, 2009	Best Feature	The Hurt Locker	Won
Gotham Independent Film Awards	November 30, 2009	Best Ensemble Performance	The Hurt Locker	Won
Gotham Independent Film Awards	November 30, 2009	Breakthrough Actor	Jeremy Renner	Nominated
Hollywood Film Festival	October 26, 2009	Actor of the Year	Jeremy Renner	Won
Hollywood Film Festival	October 26, 2009	Director of the Year	Kathryn Bigelow	Won
Hollywood Post Alliance Awards	November 12, 2010	Outstanding Editing in a Feature Film	Chris Innis; Bob Murawski	Nominated
Houston Film Critics Society	December 19, 2009	Best Picture	The Hurt Locker	Won
Houston Film Critics Society	December 19, 2009	Best Director	Kathryn Bigelow	Won
Houston Film Critics Society	December 19, 2009	Best Cinematography	Barry Ackroyd	Won
Independent Spirit Awards	February 21, 2009	Best Male Lead	Jeremy Renner	Nominated
Independent Spirit Awards	February 21, 2009	Best Supporting Male	Anthony Mackie	Nominated
International Cinephile Society Award	February 17, 2010	Best Editing	Chris Innis; Bob Murawski	Won
Irish Film and Television Awards	February 20, 2010	Best International Film	The Hurt Locker	Won
Kansas City Film Critics Circle	January 3, 2010	Best Director	Kathryn Bigelow	Won
London Film Critics' Circle	February 18, 2010	Film of the Year	The Hurt Locker	Nominated
London Film Critics' Circle	February 18, 2010	Director of the Year	Kathryn Bigelow	Won
Los Angeles Film Critics Association	December 14, 2009	Best Film	The Hurt Locker	Won
Los Angeles Film Critics Association	December 14, 2009	Best Director	Kathryn Bigelow	Won
Motion Picture Sound Editors	February 20, 2010	Best Dialogue and ADR in a Feature Film	The Hurt Locker	Nominated
Motion Picture Sound Editors	February 20, 2010	Best Sound Effects and Foley in a Feature Film	The Hurt Locker	Nominated
Nantucket Film Festival	June 21, 2009	Best Screenplay	Mark Boal	Won
National Board of Review	January 12, 2010	Best Male Breakthrough Performance	Jeremy Renner	Won
National Society of Film Critics	January 3, 2010	Best Picture	The Hurt Locker	Won
National Society of Film Critics	January 3, 2010	Best Director	Kathryn Bigelow	Won
National Society of Film Critics	January 3, 2010	Best Actor	Jeremy Renner	Won
National Society of Film Critics	January 3, 2010	Best Cinematography	Barry Ackroyd	Nominated
NAACP Image Awards	February 26, 2010	Outstanding Supporting Actor in a Motion Picture	Anthony Mackie	Nominated
New York Film Critics	December 14, 2009	Best Film	The Hurt Locker	Won
New York Film Critics	December 14, 2009	Best Director	Kathryn Bigelow	Won
New York Online Film Critics	December 13, 2009	Best Director	Kathryn Bigelow	Won
North Texas Film Critics Association	January 11, 2010	Best Director	Kathryn Bigelow	Won
Online Film Critics	January 5, 2010	Best Picture	The Hurt Locker	Won
Online Film Critics	January 5, 2010	Best Director	Kathryn Bigelow	Won
Online Film Critics	January 5, 2010	Best Original Screenplay	Mark Boal	Nominated
Online Film Critics	January 5, 2010	Best Actor	Jeremy Renner	Won
Online Film Critics	January 5, 2010	Best Supporting Actor	Anthony Mackie	Nominated
Online Film Critics	January 5, 2010	Best Cinematography	Barry Ackroyd	Nominated
Online Film Critics	January 5, 2010	Best Editing	Chris Innis; Bob Murawski	Won
Palm Springs International Film Festival	January 7, 2010	Male Breakthrough Performance	Jeremy Renner	Won
Producers Guild of America Awards	January 24, 2010	Best Theatrical Motion Picture	Kathryn Bigelow, Mark Boal, Greg Shapiro, Nicolas Chartier	Won
San Francisco Film Critics Circle	December 14, 2009	Best Picture	The Hurt Locker	Won
San Francisco Film Critics Circle	December 14, 2009	Best Director	Kathryn Bigelow	Won
Santa Barbara International Film Festival	February 4, 2010	Outstanding Director of the Year	Kathryn Bigelow	Won
Satellite Awards	December 20, 2009	Best Drama Film	The Hurt Locker	Won
Satellite Awards	December 20, 2009	Best Director	Kathryn Bigelow	Won
Satellite Awards	December 20, 2009	Best Actor	Jeremy Renner	Won
Satellite Awards	December 20, 2009	Best Original Screenplay	Mark Boal	Nominated
Satellite Awards	December 20, 2009	Best Editing	Chris Innis; Bob Murawski	Won
Saturn Awards	June 24, 2010	Best Action/Adventure/Thriller Film	The Hurt Locker	Nominated
Saturn Awards	June 24, 2010	Best Director	Kathryn Bigelow	Nominated
Screen Actors Guild Awards	January 23, 2010	Outstanding Performance by a Male Actor in a Leading Role	Jeremy Renner	Nominated
Screen Actors Guild Awards	January 23, 2010	Outstanding Performance by a Cast in a Motion Picture	The Hurt Locker	Nominated
Seattle International Film Festival	June 14, 2009	Best Director	Kathryn Bigelow	Won
ShoWest Triumph Award	April 2, 2010	Outstanding Direction	Kathryn Bigelow	Won
Southeastern Film Critics	December 14, 2009	Best Film	The Hurt Locker	Nominated
Southeastern Film Critics	December 14, 2009	Best Director	Kathryn Bigelow	Won
Southeastern Film Critics	December 14, 2009	Best Original Screenplay	Mark Boal	Nominated
Southeastern Film Critics	December 14, 2009	Best Actor	Jeremy Renner	Nominated
St. Louis Gateway Film Critics Association	December 21, 2009	Best Film	The Hurt Locker	Nominated
St. Louis Gateway Film Critics Association	December 21, 2009	Best Director	Kathryn Bigelow	Won
St. Louis Gateway Film Critics Association	December 21, 2009	Best Screenplay	Mark Boal	Nominated
St. Louis Gateway Film Critics Association	December 21, 2009	Best Actor	Jeremy Renner	Nominated
St. Louis Gateway Film Critics Association	December 21, 2009	Best Cinematography	Barry Ackroyd	Nominated
Toronto Film Critics Association	December 16, 2009	Best Picture	The Hurt Locker	Nominated
Toronto Film Critics Association	December 16, 2009	Best Director	Kathryn Bigelow	Won
Utah Film Critics Association	December 18, 2009	Best Picture	The Hurt Locker	Nominated
Utah Film Critics Association	December 18, 2009	Best Actor	Jeremy Renner	Nominated
Vancouver Film Critics Circle	January 13, 2010	Best Film	The Hurt Locker	Nominated
Vancouver Film Critics Circle	January 13, 2010	Best Director	Kathryn Bigelow	Won
Vancouver Film Critics Circle	January 13, 2010	Best Screenplay	Mark Boal	Nominated
Vancouver Film Critics Circle	January 13, 2010	Best Actor	Jeremy Renner	Nominated
Venice Film Festival	August 27, 2008	Golden Lion	The Hurt Locker	Nominated
Venice Film Festival	August 27, 2008	Gucci Group Award	Mark Boal	Won
Venice Film Festival	August 27, 2008	SIGNIS Award	The Hurt Locker	Won
Venice Film Festival	August 27, 2008	La Navicella – Venezia Cinema Award	The Hurt Locker	Won
Venice Film Festival	August 27, 2008	Human Rights Film Network Award	The Hurt Locker	Won
Washington D.C. Area Film Critics	December 7, 2009	Best Film	The Hurt Locker	Nominated
Washington D.C. Area Film Critics	December 7, 2009	Best Original Screenplay	Mark Boal	Nominated
Washington D.C. Area Film Critics	December 7, 2009	Best Director	Kathryn Bigelow	Won
Washington D.C. Area Film Critics	December 7, 2009	Best Actor	Jeremy Renner	Nominated
Washington D.C. Area Film Critics	December 7, 2009	Best Actor in a Supporting Role	Anthony Mackie	Nominated
Washington D.C. Area Film Critics	December 7, 2009	Best Breakthrough Performance	Jeremy Renner	Nominated
Washington D.C. Area Film Critics	December 7, 2009	Best Ensemble	The Hurt Locker	Won
Writers Guild of America	February 20, 2010	Best Original Screenplay	Mark Boal	Won
