= List of awards and nominations received by Kathryn Bigelow =

Kathryn Bigelow awards and nominations
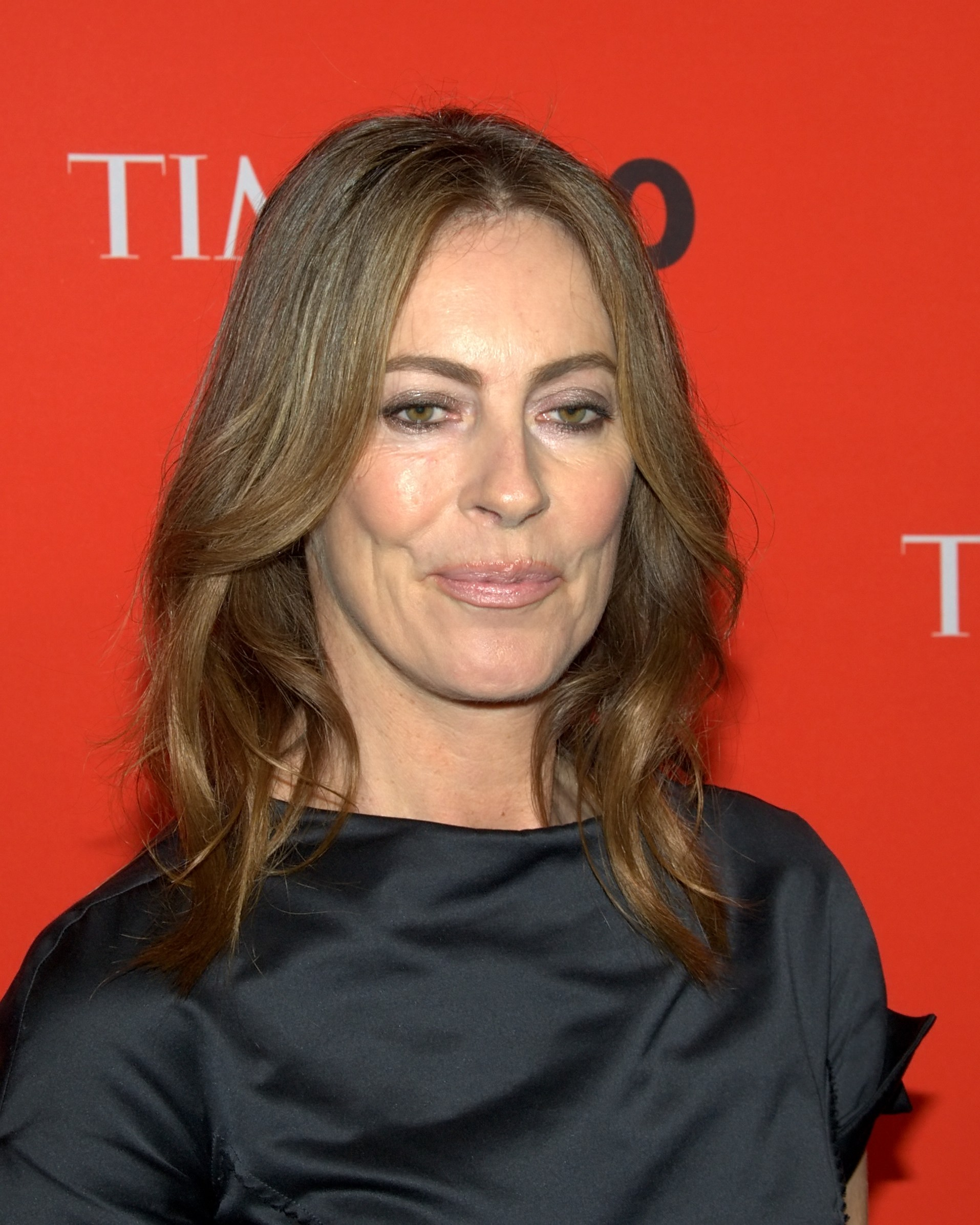
- Bigelow at the 2010 Time 100 Gala
Awards and nominations
Award	Wins	Nominations
Academy Awards	2	3
BAFTA Awards	2	4
Emmy Awards	1	1
Golden Globe Awards	0	2
Venice Film Festival	5	6

Totals (Note: Certain award groups do not simply award one winner. They acknowledge several different recipients, have runners-up, and have third place. Since this is a specific recognition and is different from losing an award, runner-up mentions are considered wins in this award tally. For simplification and to avoid errors, each award in this list has been presumed to have had a prior nomination.)
- Wins: 47
- Nominations: 58

This article is a List of awards and nominations received by Kathryn Bigelow.

Kathryn Bigelow is an American director and producer. Over her career she has received several awards including two Academy Awards, two British Academy Film Awards, a Primetime Emmy Award, and five prizes from the Venice Film Festival as well as nominations for two Golden Globe Awards.

Bigelow won Academy Awards for Best Picture and Best Director for the war drama The Hurt Locker (2009). She was Oscar-nominated for the war thriller Zero Dark Thirty (2012). She won two BAFTA Awards for Best Film and Best Direction for The Hurt Locker. She was BAFTA-nominated for Zero Dark Thirty. She was nominated for the Golden Globe Award for Best Director for both The Hurt Locker and Zero Dark Thirty.

For her work with television, at the 68th Primetime Emmy Awards, she received the Primetime Emmy Award for Exceptional Merit in Documentary Filmmaking for producing the Netflix documentary film Cartel Land (2016).

== Major associations ==
=== Academy Awards ===
Year	Category	Nominated work	Result	Ref.
2009	Best Picture	The Hurt Locker	Won	
2009	Best Director	The Hurt Locker	Won	
2012	Best Picture	Zero Dark Thirty	Nominated	

=== BAFTA Awards ===
Year	Category	Nominated work	Result	Ref.
British Academy Film Awards
2009	Best Film	The Hurt Locker	Won	
2009	Best Direction	The Hurt Locker	Won	
2012	Best Film	Zero Dark Thirty	Nominated	
2012	Best Direction	Zero Dark Thirty	Nominated	

=== Emmy Awards ===
Year	Category	Nominated work	Result	Ref.
Primetime Emmy Awards
2016	Exceptional Merit in Documentary Filmmaking	Cartel Land	Won	

=== Golden Globe Awards ===
Year	Category	Nominated work	Result	Ref.
2009	Best Director	The Hurt Locker	Nominated	
2012	Best Director	Zero Dark Thirty	Nominated	

=== Venice Film Festival ===
Year	Category	Nominated work	Result	Ref.
2009	Human Rights Film Network Award	The Hurt Locker	Won	
2009	Sergio Trasatti Award	The Hurt Locker	Won	
2009	Arca Cinemagiovani Award	The Hurt Locker	Won	
2009	SIGNIS Award	The Hurt Locker	Won	
2009	Young Cinema Award	The Hurt Locker	Won	
2012	Golden Lion	Zero Dark Thirty	Nominated	
2025	Golden Lion	A House of Dynamite	Nominated	

== Miscellaneous awards ==
Organizations	Year	Category	Work	Result	Ref.
AARP Movies for Grownups Awards	2009	Best Director	The Hurt Locker	Won	
AARP Movies for Grownups Awards	2012	Best Director	Zero Dark Thirty	Nominated	
AARP Movies for Grownups Awards	2025	Best Director	A House of Dynamite	Nominated	
AFI Dallas International Film Festival	2008	Dallas Star Award	The Hurt Locker	Won	
Alliance of Women Film Journalists Award	2008	Best Director	The Hurt Locker	Won	
Alliance of Women Film Journalists Award	2008	Best Picture	The Hurt Locker	Won	
Alliance of Women Film Journalists Award	2008	Best Woman Director	The Hurt Locker	Won	
Alliance of Women Film Journalists Award	2008	Outstanding Achievement by a Woman in the Film Industry	The Hurt Locker	Won	
Alliance of Women Film Journalists Award	2008	Women's Image Award	The Hurt Locker	Won	
Alliance of Women Film Journalists Award	2012	Best of the Fests	The Hurt Locker	Nominated	
Alliance of Women Film Journalists Award	2012	Perseverance Award	The Hurt Locker	Nominated	
American Film Institute	2009	Top 10 Films of 2009	The Hurt Locker	Won	
Austin Film Critics Association Awards	2009	Best Director	The Hurt Locker	Won	
Boston Society of Film Critics Awards	2009	Best Director	The Hurt Locker	Won	
Broadcast Film Critics Association	2009	Best Director	The Hurt Locker	Won	
Brussels International Fantastic Film Festival	1988	Silver Raven	Near Dark	Won	
Chicago Film Critics Association Awards	2009	Best Director	Near Dark	Won	
Columbia University	2009	"Andrew Sarris" Award	Near Dark	Won	
Denver Film Critics Society Awards	2009	Best Director	The Hurt Locker	Won	
Directors Guild of America Awards	2009	Outstanding Directing – Feature Film	The Hurt Locker	Won	
Hollywood Film Festival Award	2009	Director of the Year	The Hurt Locker	Won	
Houston Film Critics Society Awards	2009	Best Director	The Hurt Locker	Won	
Kansas City Film Critics Circle Awards	2009	Best Director	The Hurt Locker	Won	
Los Angeles Film Critics Association Awards	2009	Best Director	The Hurt Locker	Won	
London Film Critics' Circle Awards	2009	Director of the Year	The Hurt Locker	Won	
National Society of Film Critics Awards	2009	Best Director	The Hurt Locker	Won	
New York Film Critics Circle Awards	2009	Best Director	The Hurt Locker	Won	
New York Film Critics Online	2009	Best Director	The Hurt Locker	Won	
Oklahoma Film Critics Circle	2009	Best Director	The Hurt Locker	Won	
Online Film Critics Society	2009	Best Director	The Hurt Locker	Won	
Paris International Fantastic and Science Fiction Film Festival	1988	Golden Unicorn	The Hurt Locker	Won	
Producers Guild of America Awards	2009	Best Theatrical Motion Picture	The Hurt Locker	Won	
Rome Film Festival	2017	BNL People's Choice Award	Detroit	Nominated	
San Francisco Film Critics Circle Awards	2009	Best Director	The Hurt Locker	Won	
Santa Barbara International Film Festival	2009	Outstanding Director of the Year	The Hurt Locker	Won	
Satellite Awards	2009	Best Director	The Hurt Locker	Won	
San Sebastián International Film Festival	2000	Golden Shell Award	The Weight of Water	Won	
Saturn Awards	1988	Best Director	Near Dark	Nominated	
Saturn Awards	1995	Best Director	Strange Days	Won	
Saturn Awards	2009	Best Director	The Hurt Locker	Nominated	
Seattle International Film Festival	2009	Best Director, Golden Space Needle Award	The Hurt Locker	Won	
Southeastern Film Critics Association	2009	Best Director	The Hurt Locker	Won	
St. Louis Gateway Film Critics Association	2009	Best Director	The Hurt Locker	Won	
Vancouver Film Critics Circle	2009	Best Director	The Hurt Locker	Won	
Washington D.C. Area Film Critics Association Awards	2009	Best Director	The Hurt Locker	Won	
