= 33rd Cairo International Film Festival =

2009 Egyptian film festival

- 33rd CIFF Official Poster
- Location: Cairo, Egypt
- Founded: 1976
- Awards: Golden Pyramid
- Festival date: November 10–20, 2009
- Website: http://www.cairofilmfest.org/

The 33rd annual Cairo International Film Festival was held from November 10 to November 20, 2009. Indian director Adoor Gopalakrishnan was the president of the jury.

== Films in competition ==
The following films competed for the Golden Pyramid.

| English title | Original title | Director(s) | Country |
|---|---|---|---|
| Luisa | | Gonzalo Calzada | Argentina |
| I Believe In Angels | Vjerujem u Anđele | Niksa Svilicic | Croatia |
| The Nile Birds | عصافير النيل | Magdy Ahmed Ali | Egypt |
| Letters to Father Jackob | Postia Pappi Jaakobille | Klaus Härö | Finland |
| The Hedgehog | Le hérisson | Mona Achache | France |
| Slaves in Their Bonds | Οι Σκλάβοι στα Δεσμά τους | Adonis Lykouresis | Greece |
| The Days of Desire | Vágyakozás Napjai | Jósef Pacskovszky | Hungary |
| Madholal Keep Walking | | Jai Tank | India |
| New York | | Kabir Khan | India |
| The Friends at the Margherita Cafe | Gli amici del bar Margherita | Pupi Avati | Italy |
| Vortex | Duburys | Gytis Luksas | Lithuania |
| Crossword Destinies | فينك اليام | Driss Chouika | Morocco |
| Tiny Dust, True Love | | Shen Dong | China |
| Splinters | Drzazgi | Maciej Pieprzyca | Poland |
| Amália | | Carlos Coelho da Silva | Portugal |
| One War | Одна Война | Vera Glagoleva | Russia |
| I Saw The Sun | Güneşi Gördüm | Mahsun Kırmızıgül | Turkey |

== Digital Competition ==
The following films were screened in the Digital Competition for Feature Films category.

| English title | Original title | Director(s) | Country |
|---|---|---|---|
| (Un)Lucky | زهر | Fatma Zohra Zamoum | Algeria |
| Open Diaries | | Sasha A. Schriber | Canada |
| Exile in Paris | Paris d'exil | Ahmet Zirek | France |
| C.V. Attached | Im Anhang: Lebenslauf | Andrea Schorr | Germany |
| Tenderness | Τρυφερότητα | Panagiotis Karamitsos | Greece |
| Witches Circle | Boszorkanykor | Dizso Zsigmond | Hungary |
| First Time | Mudhal Mudhal Mudhal Varai | Krishnan Seshardi Gomatam | India |
| The Rapture of Fe | Ang Panggagahasa Kay Fe | Alvin Yapan | Philippines |
| Contract | Contrato | Nicolau Breyner | Portugal |
| Wait For Me and I Will Not Return | Čekaj me, ja sigurno neću doći | Miroslav Momcilovic | Serbia |
| Xtrems | | Abel Folk, Joan Riedweg | Spain |
| New Year's Eve | | Jhake R. Wells | Switzerland |
| The Watcher | Bekçi | Özcan Tekdemir | Turkey |
| Godforsaken | | Jamil Dehlavi | United Kingdom |

== Arab Competition ==
The following films were screened in the Arab Competition for Feature Films category.

| English title | Original title | Director(s) | Country |
|---|---|---|---|
| Journey to Algiers | رحلة الى الجزائر | Abdelkrim Baloul | Algeria |
| Heliopolis | مصر الجديدة | Ahmad Abdalla | Egypt |
| The Nile Birds | عصافير النيل | Magdy Ahmed Ali | Egypt |
| Tale of a Mchaouchi Wrestler | موسم المشاوشة | Mohamed Ahed Bensouda | Morocco |
| Crossword Destinies | فينك اليام | Driss Chouika | Morocco |
| Amreeka | أمريكا | Cherien Dabis | Palestine/United States |
| Pomegranates and Myrrh | المر و الرمان | Najwa Najjar | Palestine |
| The Long Night | الليل الطويل | Hatem Ali | Syria |
| Thirty | ثلاثون | Fadhel Jaziri | Tunisia |
| Buried Secrets | أسرار دفينة | Raja Amari | Tunisia |
| A Very Beautiful Trip | سفرة يا محلاها | Khaled Ghorbal | Tunisia/France |

== Films out of competition ==
The following films were screened out of the competition.

| English title | Original title | Director(s) | Country |
|---|---|---|---|
| A Fly in the Ashes | La mosca in la ceniza | Gabriela David | Argentina |
| Forever waiting | Hoy no se fía, mañana sí | Francisco Avizanda | Spain/France |
| Cairo Time | | Ruba Nadda | Canada |
| The Traveller | المسافر | Ahmed Maher | Egypt |
| Teza | | Haile Gerima | Ethiopia/France/Germany |
| Marchal | MR 73 | Olivier Marchal | France |
| A Widow at Last | Enfin veuve | Isabelle Mergault | France |
| Client (A French Gigolo) | Cliente | Josiane Balasko | France |
| Home | | Yann Arthus-Bertrand | France |
| Lost Times | Utolsó idők | Áron Mátyássy | Hungary |
| Dawn of the World | فجر العالم | Abbas Fahdel | France/Germany/Iraq |
| Casanegra | كزانكرا | Nour Eddine Lakhmari | Morocco |
| Ward No. 6 | Палата № 6 | Karen Shakhnazarov | Russia |
| Day of Defeated | Dehb nepemome hux | Yamburskiy Valeriy | Ukraine |
| The Soloist | | Joe Wright | United Kingdom/United States/France |
| New Town Killers | | Richard Jobson | United Kingdom |
| The Limits of Control | | Jim Jarmusch | United States/Japan |

== Juries ==
=== International Competition ===
- Adoor Gopalakrishnan, Indian director (President)
- Belkacem Hadjadj, Algerian director
- Marcelo Mosenson, Argentinian producer
- Anaïs Barbeau-Lavalette, Canadian actress and director
- Hala Fakher, Egyptian actress
- Moustafa Fahmi, Egyptian actor and cinematographer
- Giuseppe Piccioni, Italian director, writer, actor and producer
- Ingeborga Dapkunaite, Lithuanian actress
- Krzysztof Krauze, Polish director and screenwriter
- Ioana Maria Uricaru, Romanian director
- Juan Diego Botto, Spanish actor
- Tom Berenger, American actor

=== Digital Competition ===
- Victor Okhai, Nigerian director, writer and producer (President)
- Nadia Kaci, Algerian actress
- Marianne Khoury, Egyptian director and producer
- Imma Piro, Italian actress
- Vikas Swarup, Indian writer
- Joanna Kos-Krauze, Polish director and screenwriter
- Rachid Ferchiou, Tunisian director and screenwriter
- Norma Heyman, English actress
- Edreace Purmul, American director

=== Arab Competition ===
- Yehia El-Fakharany, Egyptian actor (President)
- Lyès Salem, Algerian director
- Ghada Adel, Egyptian actress
- Kassem Hawal, Iraqi director
- Sana Mouziane, Moroccan actress
- Mai Masri, Palestinian director

== Awards ==
The winners of the 2009 Cairo International Film Festival were:

- Golden Pyramid: Postia Pappi Jaakobille by Klaus Härö
- Silver Pyramid: Le hérisson by Mona Achache
- Best Director: Mona Achache for Le hérisson
- Saad El-Din Wahba Prize (Best Screenplay): Klaus Härö for Postia Pappi Jaakobille
- Best Actor:
  - Fathy Abdel Wahab for The Nile Birds
  - Subrat Dutta for Madholal Keep Walking
- Best Actress: Karolina Piechota for Drzazgi
- Naguib Mahfouz Prize (Best Directorial Debut): Gonzalo Calzada for Luisa
- Youssef Chahine Prize (Best Artistic Contribution): Vera Glagoleva for Odna voyna
- Best Arabic Film: Amreeka by Cherien Dabis
- Best Arabic Screenplay: Cherien Dabis for Amreeka
- Arabic Film Special Mention:
  - Heliopolis by Ahmad Abdalla
  - The Long Night by Hatem Ali
- Golden Award for Digital Films: The Rapture of Fe by Alvin Yapan
- Silver Award for Digital Films:
  - Exile in Paris by Ahmet Zirek
  - First Time by Krishnan Seshardi Gomatam
- FIPRESCI Prize: Mona Achache for Le hérisson
