= List of accolades received by Zero Dark Thirty =

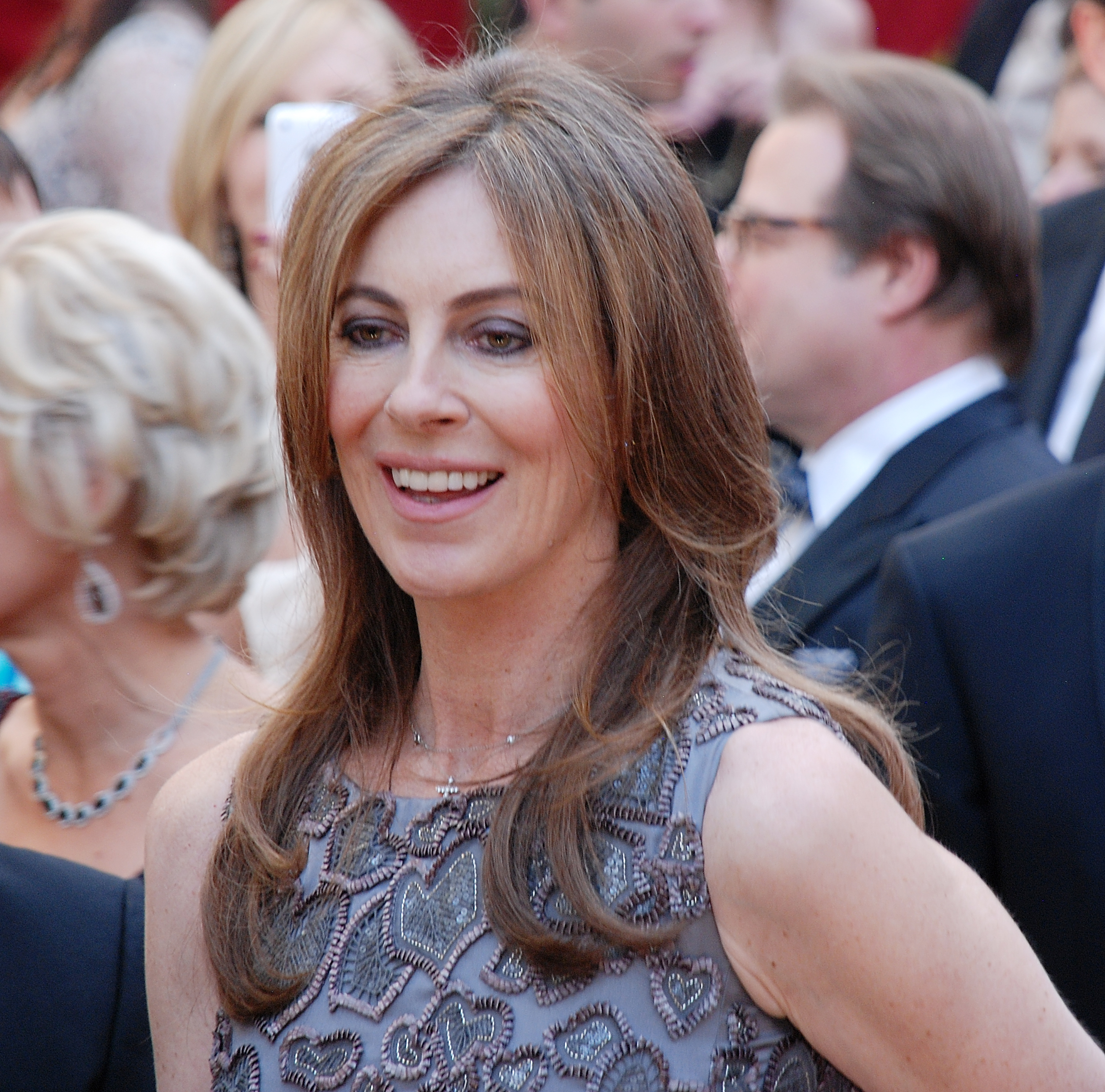
- Kathryn Bigelow, director of Zero Dark Thirty at the 82nd Academy Awards
Awards & nominations
Award	Won	Nominated
Academy Awards	1	5
British Academy of Film and Television Arts	0	5
Australian Academy of Cinema and Television Arts	0	4
African-American Film Critics Association	1	1
Alliance of Women Film Journalists	8	10
Austin Film Critics Association	1	1
Boston Society of Film Critics	3	3
Boston Online Film Critics Association	4	4
Broadcast Film Critics Association	2	5
Cinema Audio Society Awards	0	4
Chicago Film Critics Association	5	8
Dallas-Fort Worth Film Critics Association	3	4
Denver Film Critics Society	0	2
Detroit Film Critics Society	0	3
Directors Guild of America Awards	0	1
Florida Film Critics Circle	1	1
Golden Globe Awards	1	4
Grammy Awards	0	1
Houston Film Critics Society	0	4
Las Vegas Film Critics Society	1	1
London Film Critics' Circle	0	3
Los Angeles Film Critics Association Awards	1	2
National Board of Review	3	3
Nevada Film Critics Society	1	1
New York Film Critics Circle	3	5
New York Film Critics Online	3	3
Oklahoma Film Critics Circle	1	1
Online Film Critics Society	1	5
Phoenix Film Critics Society	2	5
San Diego Film Critics Society	0	4
San Francisco Film Critics Circle	2	2
Satellite Awards	1	5
Saturn Awards	0	2
Screen Actors Guild Award	0	1
St. Louis Film Critics Association	2	4
Utah Film Critics Association	2	3
Washington D. C. Area Film Critics Association	3	6
Women Film Critics Circle	3	3
Writers Guild of America	1	1
- Total number of wins and nominations
Totals	60	130
- References

Zero Dark Thirty is a 2012 American action thriller directed and co-produced by Kathryn Bigelow with screenplay by Mark Boal. The film was released in the United States on December 19, 2012, with a limited release at five theaters in Los Angeles and New York City. It made $124,848 in its limited release weekend, making it one of the biggest limited mid-week openings ever. As of March 6, 2013, Zero Dark Thirty has grossed a worldwide total of $106.8 million. Zero Dark Thirty also received a high critical acclaim, accumulating an approval rating of 93% on the review aggregator site Rotten Tomatoes.

Zero Dark Thirty earned various awards and nominations, with the nominations in categories ranging from recognition of the screenplay to its direction and editing to the cast's acting performance. It was nominated for five Academy Awards at the 85th Academy Awards, including Best Picture, Best Actress in a Leading Role, Best Original Screenplay, Best Film Editing, and won for Best Sound Editing (tied with Per Hallberg and Karen Baker Landers for Skyfall). It was also nominated for four Golden Globes at the 70th Golden Globe Awards, including Best Picture – Drama, Best Director, Best Screenplay, and won Best Actress – Drama for Jessica Chastain.

The Washington DC Area Film Critics award for Best Director was given to Kathryn Bigelow, the second time the honor has gone to a woman (the first also being Bigelow for The Hurt Locker). The film swept critics groups awards for Best Director and Best Picture including Washington DC, New York, Chicago and Boston film critics associations.

== Awards and nominations ==
Award	Date of ceremony	Category	Recipients and nominees	Result
Academy Awards	February 24, 2013	Best Picture	Mark Boal, Kathryn Bigelow & Megan Ellison	Nominated
Academy Awards	February 24, 2013	Best Actress	Jessica Chastain	Nominated
Academy Awards	February 24, 2013	Best Original Screenplay	Mark Boal	Nominated
Academy Awards	February 24, 2013	Best Film Editing	Dylan Tichenor and William Goldenberg	Nominated
Academy Awards	February 24, 2013	Best Sound Editing	Paul N. J. Ottosson	Won^{1}
British Academy of Film and Television Arts	February 10, 2013	Best Film	Kathryn Bigelow, Mark Boal, & Megan Ellison	Nominated
British Academy of Film and Television Arts	February 10, 2013	Best Director	Kathryn Bigelow	Nominated
British Academy of Film and Television Arts	February 10, 2013	Best Actress	Jessica Chastain	Nominated
British Academy of Film and Television Arts	February 10, 2013	Best Original Screenplay	Mark Boal	Nominated
British Academy of Film and Television Arts	February 10, 2013	Best Editing	Dylan Tichenor and William Goldenberg	Nominated
Australian Academy of Cinema and Television Arts	January 30, 2013	Best International Film	Kathryn Bigelow, Mark Boal, & Megan Ellison	Nominated
Australian Academy of Cinema and Television Arts	January 30, 2013	Best International Direction	Kathryn Bigelow	Nominated
Australian Academy of Cinema and Television Arts	January 30, 2013	Best International Screenplay	Mark Boal	Nominated
Australian Academy of Cinema and Television Arts	January 30, 2013	Best International Actress	Jessica Chastain	Nominated
African-American Film Critics Association	December 16, 2012	Top Film of 2012	Zero Dark Thirty	Won
Alliance of Women Film Journalists	January 7, 2013	Best Picture	Kathryn Bigelow, Mark Boal, & Megan Ellison	Won
Alliance of Women Film Journalists	January 7, 2013	Best Director (Female or Male)	Kathryn Bigelow	Won
Alliance of Women Film Journalists	January 7, 2013	Best Screenplay, Original	Mark Boal	Won
Alliance of Women Film Journalists	January 7, 2013	Best Actress	Jessica Chastain	Won
Alliance of Women Film Journalists	January 7, 2013	Best Editing	William Goldenberg and Dylan Tichenor	Won
Alliance of Women Film Journalists	January 7, 2013	Best Film Music or Score	Alexandre Desplat	Nominated
Alliance of Women Film Journalists	January 7, 2013	Best Woman Director	Kathryn Bigelow	Won
Alliance of Women Film Journalists	January 7, 2013	Humanitarian Activism - Female Icon Award	Jessica Chastain	Won
Alliance of Women Film Journalists	January 7, 2013	Outstanding Achievement by a Woman in the Entertainment Industry	Kathryn Bigelow	Nominated
Alliance of Women Film Journalists	January 7, 2013	Unforgettable Moment Award	Jessica Chastain says "I'm the mother..." - Tied with Les Misérables for Anne Hathaway singing I Dreamed a Dream	Won
Austin Film Critics Association	December 18, 2012	Best Film	Kathryn Bigelow, Mark Boal, & Megan Ellison	Won
Boston Society of Film Critics	December 9, 2012	Best Film	Kathryn Bigelow, Mark Boal, & Megan Ellison	Won
Boston Society of Film Critics	December 9, 2012	Best Director	Kathryn Bigelow	Won
Boston Society of Film Critics	December 9, 2012	Best Editing	William Goldenberg, Dylan Tichenor	Won
Boston Online Film Critics Association	December 7, 2012	Best Picture	Mark Boal, Kathryn Bigelow, & Megan Ellison	Won
Boston Online Film Critics Association	December 7, 2012	Best Director	Kathryn Bigelow	Won
Boston Online Film Critics Association	December 7, 2012	Best Actress	Jessica Chastain	Won
Boston Online Film Critics Association	December 7, 2012	Best Editing	William Goldenberg and Dylan Tichenor	Won
Broadcast Film Critics Association Award	January 10, 2013	Best Film	Kathryn Bigelow, Mark Boal, & Megan Ellison	Nominated
Broadcast Film Critics Association Award	January 10, 2013	Best Director	Kathryn Bigelow	Nominated
Broadcast Film Critics Association Award	January 10, 2013	Best Original Screenplay	Mark Boal	Nominated
Broadcast Film Critics Association Award	January 10, 2013	Best Actress	Jessica Chastain	Won
Broadcast Film Critics Association Award	January 10, 2013	Best Editing	William Goldenberg, Dylan Tichenor	Won
Central Ohio Film Critics Association	January 3, 2013	Best Picture	Kathryn Bigelow, Mark Boal, & Megan Ellison	Nominated
Central Ohio Film Critics Association	January 3, 2013	Best Director	Kathryn Bigelow	Nominated
Central Ohio Film Critics Association	January 3, 2013	Best Actress	Jessica Chastain	Nominated
Central Ohio Film Critics Association	January 3, 2013	Best Original Screenplay	Mark Boal	Nominated
Cinema Audio Society Awards	February 16, 2013	Outstanding Achievement in Sound Mixing for Motion Pictures - Live Action	Ray Beckett, Paul N. J. Ottosson, Sam Okell, Brian Smith and John Sanacore	Nominated
Chicago Film Critics Association	December 17, 2012	Best Film	Kathryn Bigelow, Mark Boal, & Megan Ellison	Won
Chicago Film Critics Association	December 17, 2012	Best Director	Kathryn Bigelow	Won
Chicago Film Critics Association	December 17, 2012	Best Actress	Jessica Chastain	Won
Chicago Film Critics Association	December 17, 2012	Best Actor	Jason Clarke	Nominated
Chicago Film Critics Association	December 17, 2012	Best Original Screenplay	Mark Boal	Won
Chicago Film Critics Association	December 17, 2012	Best Cinematography	Greig Fraser	Nominated
Chicago Film Critics Association	December 17, 2012	Best Original Score	Alexandre Desplat	Nominated
Chicago Film Critics Association	December 17, 2012	Best Editing	William Goldenberg, Dylan Tichenor	Won
Dallas–Fort Worth Film Critics Association	December 18, 2012	Best Film	Kathryn Bigelow, Mark Boal, & Megan Ellison	Nominated
Dallas–Fort Worth Film Critics Association	December 18, 2012	Best Director	Kathryn Bigelow	Won
Dallas–Fort Worth Film Critics Association	December 18, 2012	Best Screenplay	Mark Boal	Won
Dallas–Fort Worth Film Critics Association	December 18, 2012	Best Actress	Jessica Chastain	Won
Denver Film Critics Society	January 8, 2013	Best Director	Kathryn Bigelow	Nominated
Denver Film Critics Society	January 8, 2013	Best Actress	Jessica Chastain	Nominated
Detroit Film Critics Society	December 14, 2012	Best Film	Kathryn Bigelow, Mark Boal, & Megan Ellison	Nominated
Detroit Film Critics Society	December 14, 2012	Best Director	Kathryn Bigelow	Nominated
Detroit Film Critics Society	December 14, 2012	Best Actress	Jessica Chastain	Nominated
Directors Guild of America	February 2, 2013	Outstanding Directorial Achievement in Motion Pictures	Kathryn Bigelow	Nominated
Dorian Award		Film Performance of the Year - Actress	Jessica Chastain	Nominated
Empire Awards	March 24, 2013	Best Thriller	Kathryn Bigelow, Mark Boal, & Megan Ellison	Nominated
Empire Awards	March 24, 2013	Best Actress	Jessica Chastain	Nominated
Florida Film Critics Circle	December 18, 2012	Best Actress	Jessica Chastain	Won
Georgia Film Critics Association		Best Picture	Kathryn Bigelow, Mark Boal, & Megan Ellison	Nominated
Georgia Film Critics Association		Best Director	Kathryn Bigelow	Won
Georgia Film Critics Association		Best Actress	Jessica Chastain	Nominated
Georgia Film Critics Association		Best Supporting Actress	Jennifer Ehle	Nominated
Georgia Film Critics Association		Best Original Screenplay	Mark Boal	Nominated
Georgia Film Critics Association		Best Cinematography	Greig Fraser	Nominated
Golden Globe Awards	January 13, 2013	Best Motion Picture – Drama	Mark Boal, Kathryn Bigelow, & Megan Ellison	Nominated
Golden Globe Awards	January 13, 2013	Best Director	Kathryn Bigelow	Nominated
Golden Globe Awards	January 13, 2013	Best Actress – Motion Picture Drama	Jessica Chastain	Won
Golden Globe Awards	January 13, 2013	Best Screenplay	Mark Boal	Nominated
Grammy Awards	January 26, 2014	Best Score Soundtrack for Visual Media	Alexandre Desplat	Nominated
Houston Film Critics Society	January 5, 2013	Best Picture	Kathryn Bigelow, Mark Boal, & Megan Ellison	Nominated
Houston Film Critics Society	January 5, 2013	Best Director	Kathryn Bigelow	Nominated
Houston Film Critics Society	January 5, 2013	Best Actress	Jessica Chastain	Nominated
Houston Film Critics Society	January 5, 2013	Best Screenplay	Mark Boal	Nominated
Indiana Film Critics Association	December 17, 2012	Best Director	Kathryn Bigelow	Nominated
Indiana Film Critics Association	December 17, 2012	Best Actress	Jessica Chastain	Won
International Cinephile Society	February 11, 2013	Best Picture	Kathryn Bigelow, Mark Boal, & Megan Ellison	Nominated
International Cinephile Society	February 11, 2013	Best Director	Kathryn Bigelow	Nominated
International Cinephile Society	February 11, 2013	Best Actress	Jessica Chastain	Nominated
International Cinephile Society	February 11, 2013	Best Original Screenplay	Mark Boal	Nominated
International Cinephile Society	February 11, 2013	Best Editing	Dylan Tichenor and William Goldenberg	Won
Iowa Film Critics Circle	January 18, 2013	Best Film	Mark Boal, Kathryn Bigelow and Megan Ellison	Nominated
Iowa Film Critics Circle	January 18, 2013	Best Director	Kathryn Bigelow	Nominated
Iowa Film Critics Circle	January 18, 2013	Best Actress	Jessica Chastain	Won
Las Vegas Film Critics Society	December 12, 2012	Best Film	Mark Boal, Kathryn Bigelow and Megan Ellison	Nominated
Las Vegas Film Critics Society	December 12, 2012	Best Editing	William Goldenberg, Dylan Tichenor	Won
London Film Critics' Circle	January 20, 2013	Director of the Year	Kathryn Bigelow	Nominated
London Film Critics' Circle	January 20, 2013	Screenwriter of the Year	Mark Boal	Nominated
London Film Critics' Circle	January 20, 2013	Actress of the Year	Jessica Chastain	Nominated
Los Angeles Film Critics Association Awards	December 9, 2012	Best Film	Kathryn Bigelow	Nominated
Los Angeles Film Critics Association Awards	December 9, 2012	Best Editing	Dylan Tichenor, William Goldenberg	Won
National Board of Review	December 5, 2012	Best Film	Mark Boal, Kathryn Bigelow, & Megan Ellison	Won
National Board of Review	December 5, 2012	Best Director	Kathryn Bigelow	Won
National Board of Review	December 5, 2012	Best Actress	Jessica Chastain	Won
National Society of Film Critics	January 5, 2013	Best Film	Mark Boal, Kathryn Bigelow, & Megan Ellison	Nominated
National Society of Film Critics	January 5, 2013	Best Director	Kathryn Bigelow	Nominated
National Society of Film Critics	January 5, 2013	Best Actress	Jessica Chastain	Nominated
National Society of Film Critics	January 5, 2013	Best Cinematography	Greig Fraser	Nominated
Nevada Film Critics Society	December 20, 2012	Best Director	Kathryn Bigelow - Tied with Ben Affleck for Argo	Won
New York Film Critics Circle	December 3, 2012	Best Film	Mark Boal, Kathryn Bigelow, & Megan Ellison	Won
New York Film Critics Circle	December 3, 2012	Best Director	Kathryn Bigelow	Won
New York Film Critics Circle	December 3, 2012	Best Actress	Jessica Chastain	Nominated
New York Film Critics Circle	December 3, 2012	Best Cinematographer	Greig Fraser	Won
New York Film Critics Circle	December 3, 2012	Best Screenplay	Mark Boal	Nominated
New York Film Critics Online	December 3, 2012	Best Film	Mark Boal, Kathryn Bigelow, & Megan Ellison	Won
New York Film Critics Online	December 3, 2012	Best Director	Kathryn Bigelow	Won
New York Film Critics Online	December 3, 2012	Best Screenplay	Mark Boal	Won
North Carolina Film Critics Association		Best Narrative Film	Mark Boal, Kathryn Bigelow, & Megan Ellison	Nominated
North Carolina Film Critics Association		Best Director	Kathryn Bigelow	Nominated
North Carolina Film Critics Association		Best Actress	Jessica Chastain	Nominated
North Carolina Film Critics Association		Best Supporting Actor	Jason Clarke	Nominated
North Carolina Film Critics Association		Best Original Screenplay	Mark Boal	Nominated
North Carolina Film Critics Association		Tar Hell Award		Nominated
Oklahoma Film Critics Circle	December 23, 2012	Best Actress	Jessica Chastain	Won
Online Film Critics Society	January 7, 2013	Best Film	Kathryn Bigelow, Mark Boal, & Megan Ellison	Nominated
Online Film Critics Society	January 7, 2013	Best Director	Kathryn Bigelow	Nominated
Online Film Critics Society	January 7, 2013	Best Original Screenplay	Mark Boal	Nominated
Online Film Critics Society	January 7, 2013	Best Actress	Jessica Chastain	Won
Online Film Critics Society	January 7, 2013	Best Editing	William Goldenberg, Dylan Tichenor	Nominated
Phoenix Film Critics Society	December 18, 2012	Best Film	Kathryn Bigelow, Mark Boal, & Megan Ellison	Nominated
Phoenix Film Critics Society	December 18, 2012	Best Director	Kathryn Bigelow	Won
Phoenix Film Critics Society	December 18, 2012	Best Actress	Jessica Chastain	Won
Phoenix Film Critics Society	December 18, 2012	Best Original Screenplay	Mark Boal	Nominated
Phoenix Film Critics Society	December 18, 2012	Best Cinematography	Greig Fraser	Nominated
Phoenix Film Critics Society	December 18, 2012	Best Film Editing	William Goldenberg, Dylan Tichenor	Nominated
San Diego Film Critics Society	December 11, 2012	Best Film	Kathryn Bigelow, Mark Boal, & Megan Ellison	Nominated
San Diego Film Critics Society	December 11, 2012	Best Director	Kathryn Bigelow	Nominated
San Diego Film Critics Society	December 11, 2012	Best Actress	Jessica Chastain	Nominated
San Diego Film Critics Society	December 11, 2012	Best Editing	William Goldenberg, Dylan Tichenor	Nominated
San Francisco Film Critics Circle	December 16, 2012	Best Director	Kathryn Bigelow	Won
San Francisco Film Critics Circle	December 16, 2012	Best Original Screenplay	Mark Boal	Won
Satellite Awards	December 16, 2012	Best Film	Kathryn Bigelow, Mark Boal, & Megan Ellison	Nominated
Satellite Awards	December 16, 2012	Best Director	Kathryn Bigelow	Nominated
Satellite Awards	December 16, 2012	Best Actress – Motion Picture Drama	Jessica Chastain	Nominated
Satellite Awards	December 16, 2012	Best Original Screenplay	Mark Boal	Won
Satellite Awards	December 16, 2012	Best Editing	Dylan Tichenor	Nominated
Saturn Awards	June 26, 2013	Best Horror or Thriller Film	Zero Dark Thirty	Nominated
Saturn Awards	June 26, 2013	Best Actress	Jessica Chastain	Nominated
Screen Actors Guild Award	January 27, 2013	Outstanding Performance by a Female Actor in a Leading Role	Jessica Chastain	Nominated
St. Louis Film Critics Association	December 17, 2012	Best Film	Kathryn Bigelow, Mark Boal, & Megan Ellison	Nominated
St. Louis Film Critics Association	December 17, 2012	Best Director	Kathryn Bigelow	Nominated
St. Louis Film Critics Association	December 17, 2012	Best Actress	Jessica Chastain	Won
St. Louis Film Critics Association	December 17, 2012	Best Original Screenplay	Mark Boal	Won
Toronto Film Critics	December 18, 2012	Best Picture	Kathryn Bigelow, Mark Boal, & Megan Ellison	Nominated
Toronto Film Critics	December 18, 2012	Best Director	Kathryn Bigelow	Nominated
Toronto Film Critics	December 18, 2012	Best Actress	Jessica Chastain	Nominated
Toronto Film Critics	December 18, 2012	Best Screenplay	Mark Boal	Nominated
Utah Film Critics Association	December 20, 2012	Best Picture	Kathryn Bigelow, Mark Boal, & Megan Ellison	Won
Utah Film Critics Association	December 20, 2012	Best Director	Kathryn Bigelow	Nominated
Utah Film Critics Association	December 20, 2012	Best Actress	Jessica Chastain	Won
Vancouver Film Critics		Best Picture	Kathryn Bigelow, Mark Boal, & Megan Ellison	Won
Vancouver Film Critics		Best Director	Kathryn Bigelow	Won
Vancouver Film Critics		Best Actress	Jessica Chastain	Won
Vancouver Film Critics		Best Screenplay	Mark Boal	Won
Visual Effects Society Awards	February 5, 2013	Outstanding Supporting Visual Effects in a Feature Motion Picture	Geoff Anderson, Chris Harvey, Jeremy Hattingh, Richard Stutsman	Nominated
Washington D.C. Area Film Critics Association	December 10, 2012			
Washington D.C. Area Film Critics Association	December 10, 2012	Best Film	Kathryn Bigelow, Mark Boal, & Megan Ellison	Won
Washington D.C. Area Film Critics Association	December 10, 2012	Best Director	Kathryn Bigelow	Won
Washington D.C. Area Film Critics Association	December 10, 2012	Best Actress	Jessica Chastain	Won
Washington D.C. Area Film Critics Association	December 10, 2012	Best Acting Ensemble	Zero Dark Thirty	Nominated
Washington D.C. Area Film Critics Association	December 10, 2012	Best Original Screenplay	Mark Boal	Nominated
Washington D.C. Area Film Critics Association	December 10, 2012	Best Cinematography	Greig Fraser	Nominated
Women Film Critics Circle	December 22, 2012	Best Movie by a Woman	Zero Dark Thirty	Won
Women Film Critics Circle	December 22, 2012	Best Equality of the Sexes	Zero Dark Thirty	Won
Women Film Critics Circle	December 22, 2012	Best Female Images	Zero Dark Thirty	Won
Writers Guild of America	February 17, 2013	Best Original Screenplay	Mark Boal	Won
Notes: ^1 — Tied with Per Hallberg and Karen Baker Landers for Skyfall.
