= Gonzalo Calzada =

Argentinian filmmaker (born 1970)

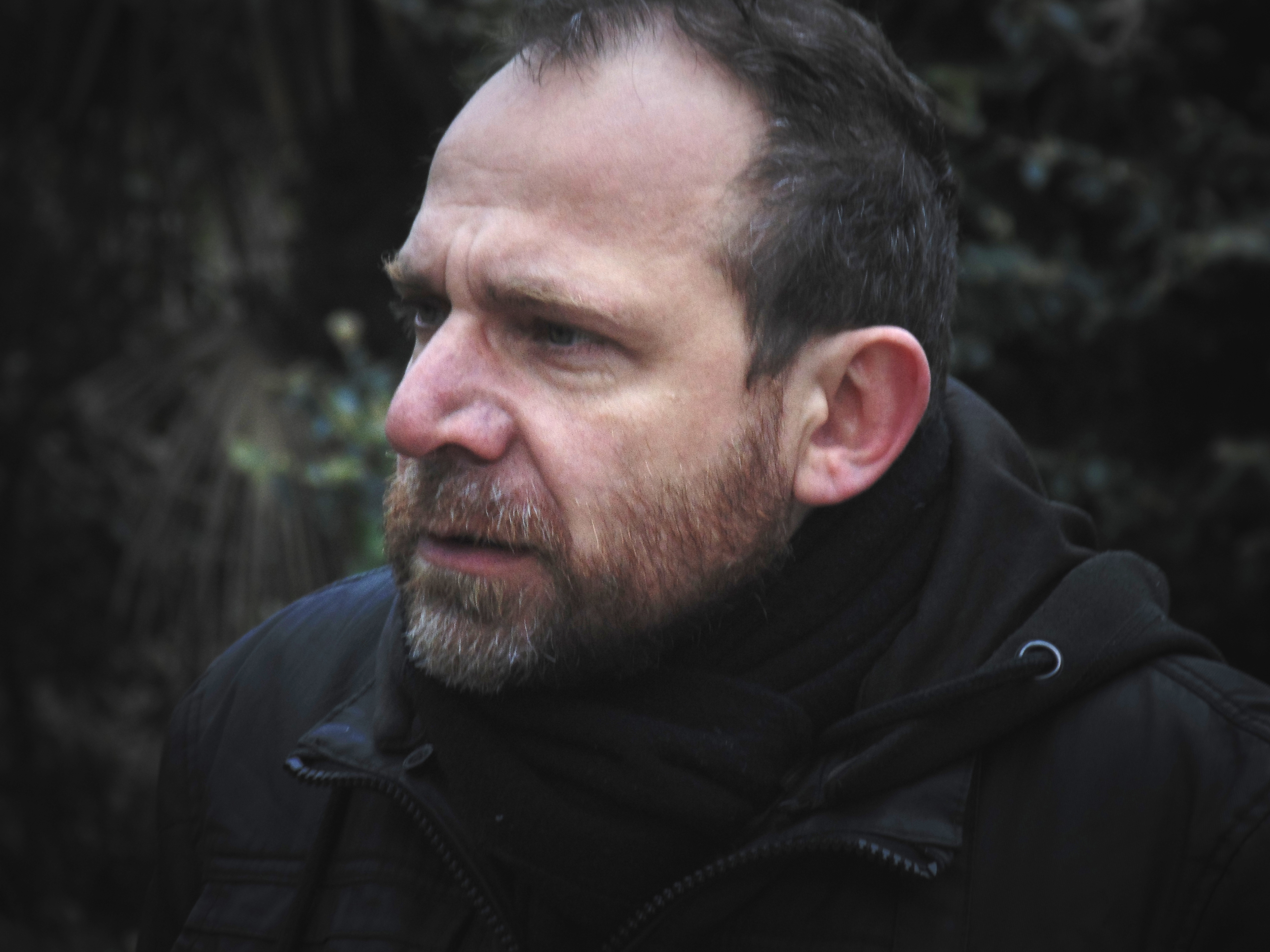
- Born: September 15, 1970 (age 55); Comodoro Rivadavia, Argentina
- Education: Universidad del Cine in Manuel Antín
- Occupations: filmmaker and writer
- Years active: 1994–present
- Known for: directoral work on fantasy and horror films
- Notable work: Luisa, Resurrection

Gonzalo Calzada (born September 15, 1970) is an Argentine filmmaker and writer, best known for his directoral work on fantasy and horror films. His film Luisa was awarded the best "opera prima" at the 33rd Cairo International Film Festival in 2009. His film Resurrection achieved historic box office rankings for its genre in Argentina. Calzada's work is internationally recognized by film critics.

== Career ==
Calzada was born September 15, 1970, in Comodoro Rivadavia, Argentina. He earned a Director Bachelor's Degree from the Universidad del Cine in Manuel Antín, where he is a faculty member. He has also worked as a screenwriter, author and film producer. His university experience inspired his short films, including: La Puerta, Valdemar, El Milagro de la Sangre and Mandinga, as well as documentaries about film making in a socially deprived environment.

Calzada began his career in feature films, and later directed the film Luisa (2007) based on a screenplay by Rocio Azuaga. Luisa is a dramatic comedy with macabre humor, in which the protagonist overcomes a bumpy period of instability and isolation after her casual meetings with unexpected characters of daily life that help her face issues "with nobility, humor, tolerance and solidarity". In addition to the best feature film award at the Cairo International Film Festival in 2009, Luisa was nominated for 2010 "Cóndor de Plata" awards in the categories of best début film and best actress for Leonor Manso. Luisa also received acclaim at the Metrovías cinema competition in 2007 for best script, the Pinamar Screen 2009, and at the Rio de Janeiro International Film Festival in 2009.

In 2010, Calzada directed his second feature film, La Plegaria del Vidente, based on the crime thriller novel of Carlos Balmaceda. Inspired by a real event in Argentina, the movie tells the story of a serial killer of prostitutes, complicated by the actions of police, politicians and criminals. Premiered at the film festivals in Mar del Plata (2012) and Ceará (2014), this film received praise from critics.

In 2015, Calzada directed Resurrection, a film inspired by his personal story. In a Gothic horror style, the film narrates the events and spiritual torments affecting a young priest engaged in an effort to help the victims of the Buenos Aires yellow fever epidemic of 1871. The film was a box office success, and received praise from critics.,

Luciferina (2018), a horror film set in Argentina, is the fourth feature film directed by Calzada. Based on his script, the film focuses on a novice tormented by traumas and hallucinations linked to a family secret that can only be resolved by an exorcism following local shamanic traditions. With approval by critics, Luciferina has been presented at international festivals, including in Sitges, Brussels and Philadelphia. The film is the first of a trilogy of stories in which young virgins are the victims of satanic possession.

Calzada directs La Puerta Cinematográfica, a film production company based in Buenos Aires.

== Filmography ==
=== Director ===
- 1994 La puerta (Short)
- 1996 El milagro de la sangre (Short)
- 2000 Valdemar
- 2009 Luisa
- 2012 La plegaria del vidente
- 2015 Resurrección
- 2018 Luciferina
- 2021 Nocturna

=== Writer ===
- 1994 La puerta (Short)
- 1996 El milagro de la sangre (Short)
- 2000 Valdemar
- 2003 La Vieja de la Bolsa (Short)
- 2015 Resurrección (screenplay)
- 2018 Luciferina

=== Producer ===
- 1996 El milagro de la sangre (Short)
- 2012 La plegaria del vidente
