= Make a Wish (2006 film) =

- Directed by: Cherien Dabis
- Written by: Cherien Dabis
- Produced by: Cherien Dabis
- Starring: Mayar Rantisse; Lone Khilleh; Iman Aoun
- Edited by: Cherien Dabis
- Music by: Kathryn Bostic
- Release date: 2006
- Running time: 12 minutes
- Language: Arabic with English subtitles

Make a Wish (Itmannah) is a 2006 Palestinian-American short film by Cherien Dabis. It tells the story of Mariam, an 11-year-old Palestinian girl who faces enormous obstacles buying a birthday cake. It premiered at the 2007 Sundance Film Festival and received a number of awards at other festivals. It was released on DVD as a short for Dabis' 2009 feature film, Amreeka.

== Cast ==
- Mariam Mayar - Rantisse
- Lama Lone- Khilleh
- Aida Iman - Aoun

== Awards ==
2007 Aspen Shortsfest

- Won: BAFTA/LA Award for Excellence - Honorable Mention
- Won: Special Recognition

2007 Cairo International Film Festival for Children

- Won: Ministry of Culture's Awards for Arabian Feature & Short Films
- 3rd place: Bronze Cairo - Best Short Film

2007 Chicago International Children's Film Festival

- Won: Adult's Jury Award - Certificate of Merit Live-Action Short Film or Video
- Won: Peace Prize

2007 Clermont-Ferrand International Short Film Festival

- Won: Press Award - International Competition
- Won: Special Mention of the Jury - International Competition
