= Resurrection (2016 Argentine film) =

- Spanish: Resurrección
- Directed by: Gonzalo Calzada
- Written by: Gonzalo Calzada
- Produced by: Aldana Aprile; Esteban Mentasti; Horacio Mentasti; Hori Mentasti; Alejandro Narváez; Serena Paradiso
- Cinematography: Claudio Beiza
- Edited by: Alejandro Narváez
- Music by: Supercharango
- Production companies: Buffalo Films; Cinemagroup; La Puerta Cinematográfica
- Distributed by: Energía Entusiasta
- Release date: 7 January 2016 (Argentina)
- Running time: 102 minutes
- Country: Argentina
- Language: Spanish

Resurrection (Resurrección) is an Argentinian 2016 horror movie written and directed by Gonzalo Calzada. The movie was simultaneously premiered on Jan 7, 2016 in Argentina and Peru. Upon its release, the film reached historical box office records for the genre in Argentina.

== Plot ==
Set in the context of the Yellow fever epidemic that struck the city of Buenos Aires in 1871, Resurrección is the story of a young priest who, impelled by a mystical vision, goes to the capital city to assist the victims and sick people affected by the terrible epidemic. A series of unexpected events corners him in that place and makes him doubt the meaning of his initial mission, his beliefs and finally also his faith.

== Cast ==
- Patricio Contreras as Quispe/Ernesto
- Martín Slipak as Father Aparicio
- Vando Villamil as Healer
- Adrián Navarro as Edgardo
- Lola Ahumada as Remedios
- Ana Fontán as Lucía
- Diego Alonso as Eugenio
