= Nisreen Faour =

Israeli actress

- نسرين فاعور
- Born: 1972 (age 53–54); Ma'alot-Tarshiha, Israel
- Occupation: Actress

Nisreen Faour (Arabic: نسرين فاعور; born August 2, 1972) is a Palestinian actress, best known for her role as Muna in the 2009 American film, Amreeka.

Faour was born in Ma'alot-Tarshiha, Israel, and moved to the United States to study theater and performance when she was 16. She then came back home in order to study acting at the Kibbutzim College of Education in Tel Aviv between 1991 and 1994, and later on directing at the University of Haifa. She has performed in a number of award-winning theatrical plays. She also appeared in Israeli films in arabic such as In the Eighth Month, directed by Ali Nassar, Jamr Alhikaya (Whispering Embers) and The Savior. Her television appearances include Family Deluxe, as well as Mishwar Al-Joma.

Faour's performance as Muna Farah, a Palestinian immigrant to the United States in the 2009 independent film Amreeka, received high marks from film critics. American film critic Kenneth Turan argues that, while all of the casting choices "are excellent, [...] it is Palestinian actress Nisreen Faour as the irrepressible Muna who truly owns the picture".

== Awards ==
- 2009 Dubai International Film Festival - Won Muhr Award as Best Actress for Amreeka
- 2010 Independent Spirit Awards - Nominated Independent Spirit Award for Best Female Lead - Amreeka
