= Letters to Father Jacob =

- Theatrical release poster
- Directed by: Klaus Härö
- Screenplay by: Klaus Härö
- Story by: Jaana Makkonen
- Produced by: Risto Salomaa; Lasse Saarinen
- Starring: Kaarina Hazard; Heikki Nousiainen
- Cinematography: Tuomo Hutri
- Edited by: Samu Heikkilä
- Music by: Dani Strömbäck
- Distributed by: FilmSharks International
- Release dates: 29 January 2009 (Sweden); 3 April 2009 (Finland)
- Running time: 76 minutes
- Country: Finland
- Language: Finnish
- Budget: 525 402 €

Letters to Father Jacob (Finnish: Postia pappi Jaakobille) is a 2009 Finnish drama film written and directed by Klaus Härö. Set in the early 1970s and based on a story by Jaana Makkonen, the film tells the story of Leila, a pardoned convict, who becomes an assistant to a blind priest, Jacob. The film depicts her transformation from a sceptic who grudgingly reads letters aloud to her benefactor into a caring savior of the pastor from his despair after the letters stop coming.

In 2022, the film was chosen as the "most touching Finnish film of the 21st century" in the Helsingin Sanomat readers' vote.

== Locations ==
Exteriors were filmed at St. Olaf's Church in Sastamala, Finland (Pyhän Olavin kirkko). The interiors were filmed at Holy Cross Church in Hattula (Pyhän Ristin kirkko).

== Accolades ==
Nordic Film Days, Lübeck, Germany, 4.–8.11.2009
Interfilm Church Prize
Audience Award

58th International Filmfestival Mannheim-Heidelberg, Germany, 5.–15.11.2009
Main Award

33rd Cairo International Film Festival, Egypt, 10.–20.11.2009
The Golden Pyramid for the Best Film
The Prize for the Best Screenwriter (Klaus Härö)

Black Nights Film Festival, Tallinn, Estonia, 27.11.-6.12.2009
Jury Prize for the Best Director

28th Fajr International Film Festival, Iran, 1.–11.2.2010
Crystal Simorgh Prize for the Best Film in the Competition of Quest for Truth & Justice

33rd Göteborg International Film Festival, Sweden, 29.1.–8.2.2010
Nordic Film Music Prize (composer Dan Strömbäck)

Santa Barbara International Film Festival, USA, 4.–14.2.2010
The Best International Film Award

Festival du Cinéma Nordique, Rouen, France, 10.–21.3.2010
Best Actress Award (Kaarina Hazard)
Best Actor Award (Heikki Nousiainen)
Audience Award

Cape Winelands Film Festival, South Africa, 17.–27.3.2010
Special Mention Award (actor Heikki Nousiainen)

Hong Kong International Film Festival, 21.3.–11.4.2010
SIGNIS Commendation

RiverRun International Film Festival, NC, USA, 15.–25.4.2010
BB&T Audience Award for Best Narrative Feature

Festroia, Portugal, 4.–13.6.2010
Prize Man and His Environment

Festival de Cine de Huesca, Spain, 4.–12.6.2010
Audience Award
