= Cherien Dabis =

American film director (born 1976)

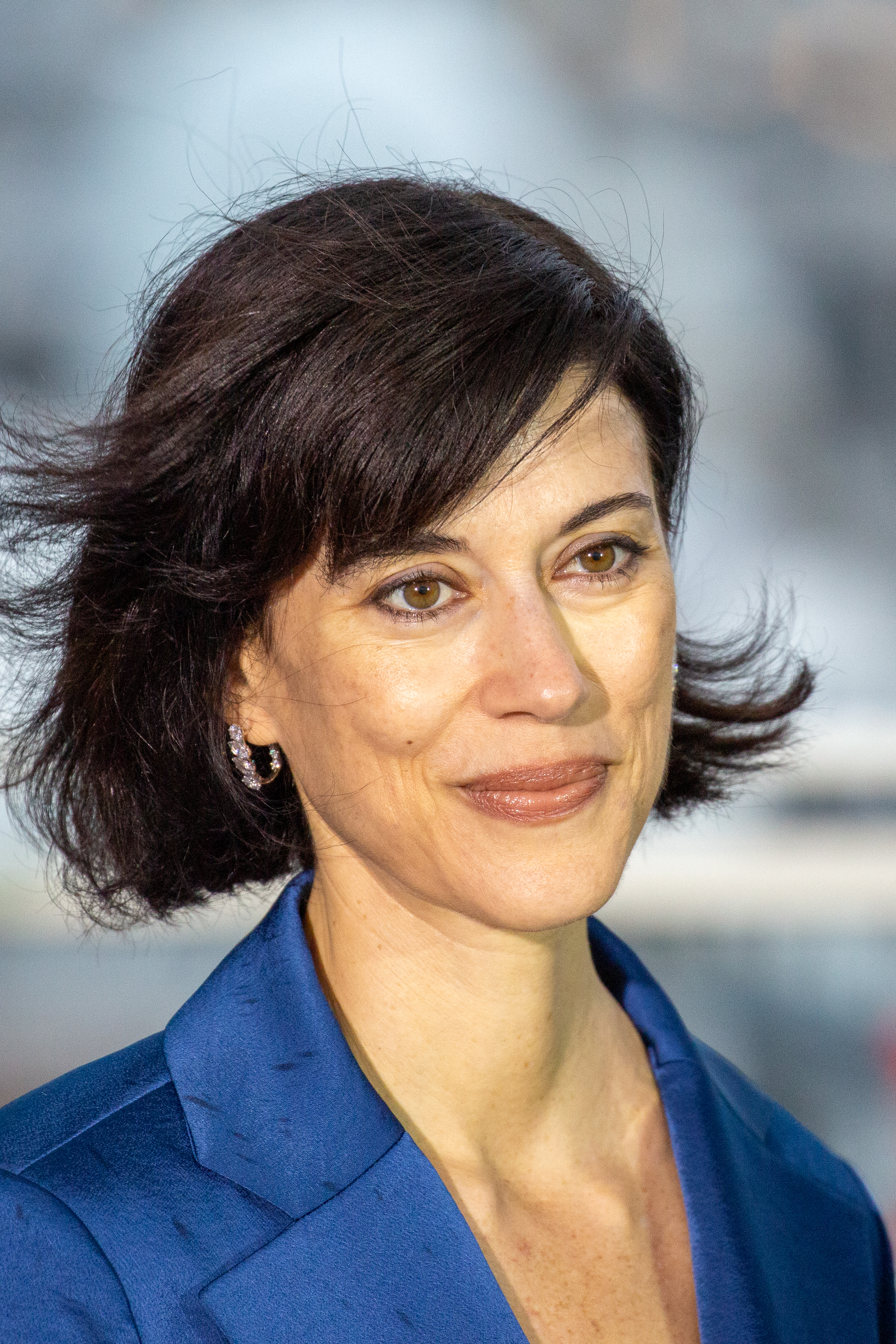
- Dabis at the 2025 Cannes Film Festival
- Born: November 27, 1976 (age 49); Omaha, Nebraska, U.S.
- Education: University of Cincinnati (BA); Columbia University (MFA)

Cherien Dabis (born 1976) (Arabic: شيرين دعيبس) is a Palestinian-American actress, director, producer, and screenwriter. She was named one of Variety magazine's 10 Directors to Watch in 2009, and in 2010 received a United States Artists (USA) Fellowship. In 2022, she was nominated for an Emmy Award in the category Outstanding Directing For A Comedy Series award for her work on the television series Only Murders in the Building. In March 2022, Dabis was named Laureate for Cultural Excellence by the Takreem foundation for her work on authentic Arab representation in Hollywood.

== Early life ==
Dabis was born in Omaha, Nebraska. Her father is a physician of Palestinian descent, and her mother is from Salt, Jordan.

She grew up in the small town of Celina, Ohio, and spent many of her summers in Jordan. Dabis at 8 visited Palestine for the first time. She and her family were held at the Israeli border for 12 hours, and she was strip-searched along with her sisters. This incident would make her understand "what it meant to be Palestinian". She would not return to Palestine until 20 years later. She identifies as a Muslim.

Back in the US, Dabis' hometown was populated predominantly by middle-class families from German backgrounds. Upon her return from trips to the Middle East, she would be asked if there were telephones and cars back in Jordan. As a Palestinian American, Dabis refused to be seen as an outsider, and instead chose to assimilate to the culture she found herself within. However, when the Gulf War commenced in 1990, things changed for her and her family. Her father lost many of his patients, her mother was called an "Arab bitch", and her family began receiving death threats. Although Dabis has no brothers, a rumor began that her father's "son" was fighting in Saddam Hussein's army. It is also at this time that her family was investigated by the Secret Service because of a rumor that claimed her sister had threatened to kill George H. W. Bush, who was the president at the time.

It is following these incidents that Dabis claims she faced an identity crisis, wherein she became aware of the fact that she was an "Arab in America". These events would go on to influence her desire to create films. She was 14 years old when she realized that no one was accurately portraying the lives of Arabs in America. She saw a great need to change the way in which Arabs were portrayed in the media. Years later, she would take filmmaking at Columbia University, and make films that represent her experiences as an Arab American, with a goal of changing the negative stereotypes in the film industry that contributed to the racism she experienced.

== Education ==
Dabis received her B.A. with honors in creative writing and communications from the University of Cincinnati and her M.F.A. in film from Columbia University School of the Arts in 2004.

== Career ==
=== Film ===
Dabis defines herself as a humanist, and describes in her words, "after years spent working in Washington, D.C., I realized that I could reach more people and affect more change through fiction than politics." She believes the medium is a powerful tool when discussing various issues. She says that because she was raised between the Middle East and the Mid-West, she has a unique perspective, one that she wanted to represent in her films. As a result, her films are somewhat autobiographical, and the influences drawn from her own personal life are quite evident. And so, her films take on themes of immigration, discrimination, cultural assimilation, and family. Her two first feature films complement one another, and as Dabis puts it, the two "complete a diptych". Amreeka was about being Arab in America, and May in the Summer was about being American in the Middle East. The two films represent the merging, and often clashing, of two separate worlds.

Her first short film, Make a Wish, premiered at the 2007 Sundance Film Festival and received awards at other festivals. She was a writer with the television series The L Word from 2006 to 2008.

Dabis made her feature film debut with Amreeka which premiered at the 2009 Sundance Film Festival. The film also opened to critical praise other important venues. The DVD for Amreeka was released on January 12, 2010 with Make a Wish.

Dabis' second feature film May in the Summer screened at the opening night of the 2013 Sundance Film Festival.

Dabis's third feature film All That's Left of You had its world premiere at the 2025 Sundance Film Festival. The film was selected as the Jordanian entry for the Best International Feature Film at the 98th Academy Awards.

Among Dabis' upcoming projects is a comedy of sorts.

==== Amreeka ====
Amreeka was Dabis' debut feature film and she says it is "loosely based on things that happened to us during the first Gulf War". It recounts the story of Muna Farah, a Palestinian divorcee, and her son, Fadi. Muna works in the West Bank, and must pick up her son after school every day. In order to get home, they must cross an Israeli checkpoint where they are harassed. One day, Muna discovers that she has been awarded a green card through the lottery. Fed up with her living situation, she decides to pack up and leave for the U.S. with her son. The film is set following the invasion of Iraq in 2003, and so the pair have some trouble at customs. After discovering that a cookie box containing her life savings has gone missing at the airport, Muna decides she needs to find a job. However, her many qualifications do not secure her a high-paying job, and so she has no choice but to accept a position at White Castle. Alongside this hardship, Muna also finds out that her family is facing a great deal of discrimination within the post-9-11 and Iraq War context. Her family receives threats, and her brother-in-law loses patients. Later on, Fadi gets into a fight at school with other children who are influenced by the information they are getting from the media. His classmates even go so far as to come to White Castle and make scathing remarks to Muna, who ends up hurting herself after slipping on a drink poured by one of the kids. When Fadi is arrested after causing a fight following this incident, his principal Mr. Novatski speaks on his behalf and gets him released. The film ends with Muna inviting Mr. Novatski to dinner, and everyone sings and dances. The story mirrors the harsh reality many immigrants must face.

==== May in the Summer ====
May in the Summer was Dabis' second feature film and was shot on location in Jordan, where she spent her own summers. Not only did she write, direct, and produce the film, but this was also her acting debut. The story follows May Brennan, a successful author from New York City who is engaged to Ziad. The two plan to marry in her hometown of Amman. When she does arrive in Jordan, her mother Nadine, a born-again Christian, vehemently disapproves of the fact that May is planning on marrying a Muslim man. Her younger sisters Dalia and Yasmine are also a handful. Her estranged father Edward also decides to show up and wants to make amends. As her wedding day gets closer, May has to deal with more issues from her past, as she must remember the painful details of her parents' divorce. May in The Summer is a story about the reconciliation of modern and traditional values.

=== Television ===
Dabis began her career as a writer on the popular television show The L Word. She has also directed episodes of Ramy, Ozark, The Sinner, and Only Murders in the Building.

== Personal life ==
Dabis is based in New York City. She is bisexual.

== Inspiration ==
Dabis grew up watching Egyptian movies. Her family had a vast VHS collection of Egyptian films and she describes them as the beginning of her education in film. E.T and The Wizard of Oz are American films that affected her perception of what films could strive to be. She also mentions Mike Leigh, John Cassavetes, and Robert Altman as personal influences, as well as films such as The 400 Blows, Bicycle Thieves, Ali: Fear Eats the Soul, A Woman Under the Influence, Working Girl, Midnight Cowboy and In the Mood for Love. She considers this final film to perhaps be her favorite of all time.

== Filmography ==
=== Film ===
Year	Title	Role	Notes
2003	Nadah	Writer	Short film
2004	Memoirs of an Evil Stepmother	Producer, director, writer	Short film
2004	Little Black Boot	Writer	Short film
2006	Make a Wish	Producer, director	Short film
2009	Amreeka	Executive producer, director, writer	
2013	Not Another Word	Producer, director, writer	Short film
2013	May in the Summer	Producer, director, writer, actor (May)	
2014	Villa Touma	Actor (Antoinette Touma)	
2021	Tallahassee	Actor	Short film
2025	All That's Left of You	Producer, director, writer, actor (Hanan)	
2025	Eagles of the Republic	Actor (Rula)	

=== Television ===
Year	Title	Role	Notes
2005	The D Word	Director, writer	
2006–2008	The L Word	Co-producer, writer	
2015–2017	Quantico	Producer, director, writer	
2016–2017	Empire	Supervising producer, director, writer	
2017–2018	The Sinner	Director	
2018	Impulse	Director	
2018	Sweetbitter	Director	
2018–2019	Ramy	Co-executive producer, director	
2020	Ozark	Director	
2020	Little Voice	Director	
2021–2023	Only Murders in the Building	Director	
2022	Mo	Actor (Nadia Najjar)	
2022	Extrapolations	Actor (Lina)	
2024	Fallout	Actor (Birdie)	

== Awards ==
Year	Work	Award	Category	Result	Notes
2007	Make a Wish (Atmenah)	Aspen Shortsfest	BAFTA/LA Award for Excellence	Honorable mention	
2007	Make a Wish (Atmenah)	Aspen Shortsfest	Special Jury Award	Won	
2007	Make a Wish (Atmenah)	Cairo International Film Festival for Children	Ministry of Culture's Awards for Arabian Feature & Short Film	Won	
2007	Make a Wish (Atmenah)	Cairo International Film Festival for Children	Bronze Cairo: Best Short Film	Nominated	
2007	Make a Wish (Atmenah)	Chicago International Children's Film Festival	Adult Jury Certificate of Merit: Live-Action Short Film or Video	Won	
2007	Make a Wish (Atmenah)	Chicago International Children's Film Festival	Peace Prize	Won	
2007	Make a Wish (Atmenah)	Clermont-Ferrand International Short Film Festival	Press Award: International Competition	Won	
2007	Make a Wish (Atmenah)	Clermont-Ferrand International Short Film Festival	Special Mention of the Jury: International Competition		
2007	Make a Wish (Atmenah)	Dubai International Film Festival	Muhr Arab award: Best short	Won	
2007	Amreeka	Tribeca Film Festival	Best Screenplay	Won	
2009	Amreeka	Sundance Film Festival	Grand Jury Prize: Dramatic	Nominated	
2009	Amreeka	Cannes Film Festival	Fipresci Prize	Won	
2009	Amreeka	Cannes Film Festival	Golden Camera	Nominated	
2009	Amreeka	Cannes Film Festival	C.I.C.A.E. Award	Nominated	
2009	Amreeka	Cairo International Film Festival	Best Arabic Screenplay	Won	
2009	Amreeka	Cairo International Film Festival	Best Arabic Film	Won	
2009	Amreeka	Zurich Film Festival	Variety's New Talent Award	Won	
2009	Amreeka	Zurich Film Festival	Goldeneye: Best International Feature Film	Nominated	
2009	Amreeka	Stockholm International Film Festival	Bronze Horse	Nominated	
2009	Amreeka	Dubai International Film Festival	Muhr Arab award: Best Film	Nominated	
2009	Amreeka	Gotham Awards	Best Feature	Nominated	
2010	Amreeka	Independent Spirit Awards	Best Film	Nominated	
2010	Amreeka	Independent Spirit Awards	Best First Screenplay	Nominated	
2010	Amreeka	Women Film Critics Circle Awards	Best Movie by a Woman	Nominated	
2010	Amreeka	Women Film Critics Circle Awards	Best Woman Storyteller	Nominated	
2010	Amreeka	Vancouver Film Critics Circle	Best Director in a Canadian Film	Nominated	
2013	May in the Summer	Sundance Film Festival	Grand Jury Prize: Dramatic	Nominated	
2013	May in the Summer	Venice Film Festival	Fedeora Award: Best Film	Nominated	
2013	May in the Summer	Dubai International Film Festival	Muhr Arab award: Best Film	Nominated	
2015	No End in Sight	Creative Capital	Video installation	Won	
2022	Only Murders in the Building "The Boy from 6B"	Primetime Emmy Award	Outstanding Directing (Comedy)	Nominated	
2022	Only Murders in the Building "The Boy from 6B"	Hollywood Critics Association Television Awards	Best Directing in a Streaming Series, Comedy	Nominated	
2022	Only Murders in the Building "The Boy from 6B"	International Online Cinema Awards (INOCA)	Best Directing for a Comedy Series	Nominated	
2022	Only Murders in the Building "The Boy from 6B"	Gold Derby Award	Comedy Episode	Won	
2023	Mo	Peabody Award	Entertainment	Won	

== See also ==
- List of female film and television directors
- List of LGBT-related films directed by women
