= Kathryn Bigelow =

American filmmaker (born 1951)

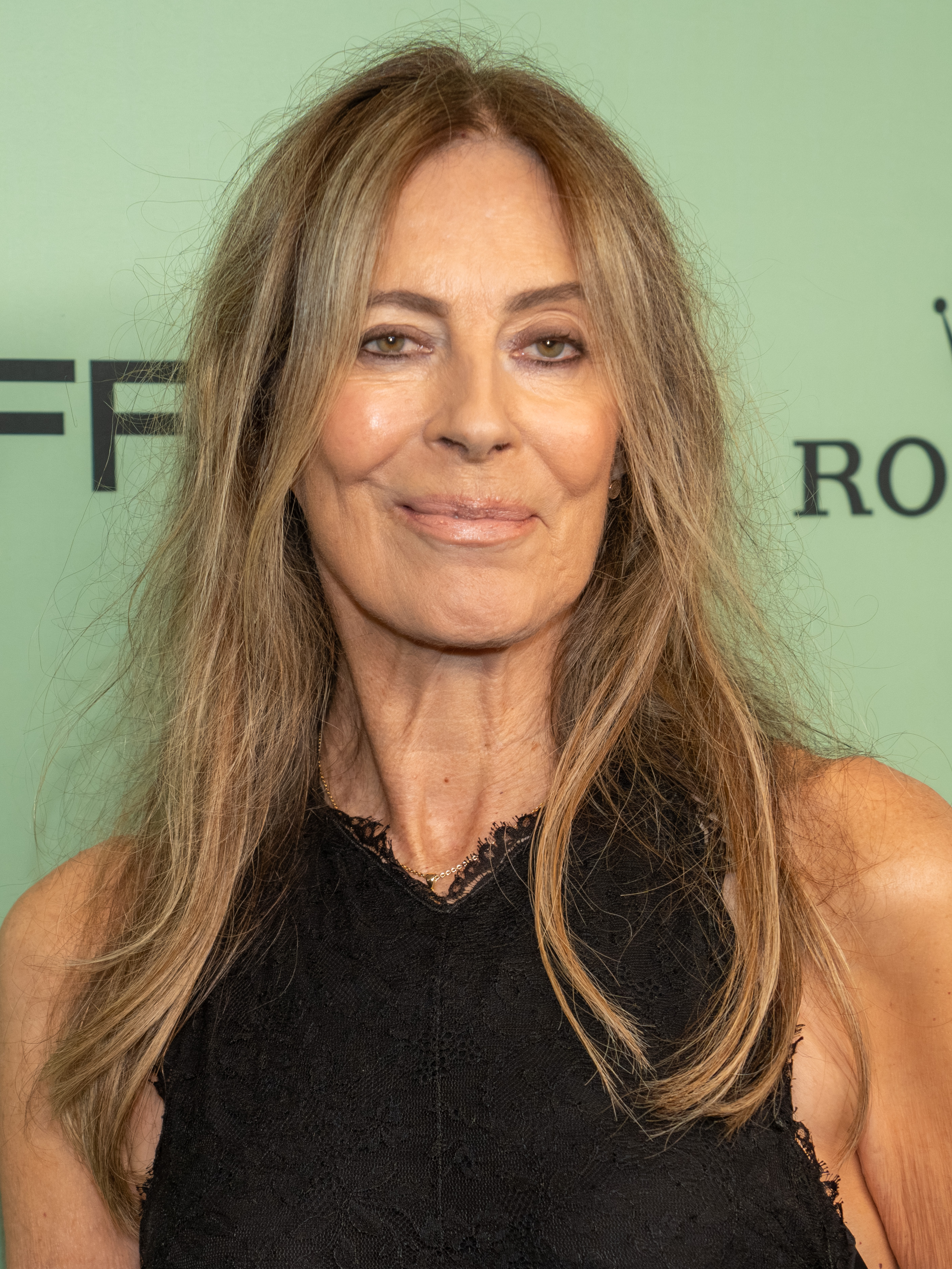
- Bigelow in 2025
- Born: Kathryn Ann Bigelow; November 27, 1951 (age 74); San Carlos, California, U.S.
- Education: San Francisco Art Institute (BFA); Columbia University (MFA)
- Occupations: Film director; producer; writer
- Years active: 1978–present
- Spouse: James Cameron (m. 1989; div. 1991)
- Awards: Full list

Kathryn Ann Bigelow (/ˈbɪɡəˌloʊ/; born November 27, 1951) is an American filmmaker. Her accolades include two Academy Awards, two BAFTA Awards, and a Primetime Emmy Award.

Bigelow made her directorial film debut with the outlaw biker film The Loveless (1981). She rose to prominence directing the thrillers Near Dark (1987), Blue Steel (1990), Point Break (1991), Strange Days (1995), and K-19: The Widowmaker (2002). For directing the war drama The Hurt Locker (2008), Bigelow became the first woman to win the Academy Award for Best Director. She has since directed the political action thriller Zero Dark Thirty (2012), the crime drama Detroit (2017), and the political thriller A House of Dynamite (2025).

She directed episodes of the NBC series Homicide: Life on the Street (1998–1999), and won the Primetime Emmy Award for Exceptional Merit in Documentary Filmmaking for her work on the documentary film Cartel Land (2015). She is known for her collaborations with Eric Red and Mark Boal.

== Early life and education ==
Kathryn Ann Bigelow was born on November 27, 1951, in San Carlos, California, the only child of Gertrude Kathryn (née Larson), a librarian, and Ronald Elliot Bigelow, a paint factory manager. Her mother was of Norwegian descent. She attended Sunny Hills High School in Fullerton, California.

Bigelow's early creative endeavors were as a painting student at San Francisco Art Institute, where she enrolled in the fall of 1970. While enrolled at SFAI, she was accepted into the Whitney Museum of American Art's Independent Study Program (ISP) in New York City from fall of 1971 to the spring 1972. While at the ISP, her advisers included artist Brice Marden and Susan Sontag. She received her bachelor of fine arts degree from SFAI in December 1972. Returning to New York City, for a while, Bigelow lived as an impoverished artist, staying with painter Julian Schnabel in performance artist Vito Acconci's loft. She had a minor role in Richard Serra's video Prisoner's Dilemma (1974). Bigelow teamed up with Philip Glass on a real-estate venture in which they renovated distressed apartments downtown and sold them for a profit. "He [Glass] would do the plumbing, and I would do the Sheetrock."

Bigelow entered the graduate film program at Columbia University, where she studied theory and criticism and earned her master's degree. Her professors included Vito Acconci, Sylvère Lotringer, and Susan Sontag, as well as Andrew Sarris and Edward W. Said, and she worked with the Art & Language collective and Lawrence Weiner. While working with Art & Language Bigelow published an article, "Not on the Development of Contradiction," in the short-lived Art & Language magazine The Fox, and began a short film, The Set-Up (1978), which found favor with director Miloš Forman, then teaching at Columbia University, and which Bigelow later submitted as part of her MFA at Columbia. During her graduate studies at Columbia, she also studied under seminal film theorist Peter Wollen. Bigelow immersed herself in the critical theory that heavily influenced her first feature film. She co-directed her first film, The Loveless, with her film school classmate Monty Montgomery in 1981.

Also in 1981, she was invited by John Baldessari to teach for a single semester in the School of Art at California Institute of the Arts.

== Career ==
=== 1981–2002: Beginnings and breakthrough ===
Bigelow's short The Set-Up is a 20-minute deconstruction of violence in film. The film portrays "two men fighting each other as the semioticians Sylvère Lotringer and Marshall Blonsky deconstruct the images in voice-over." Bigelow asked her actors to actually beat and bludgeon each other throughout the film's all-night shoot. Her first full-length feature was The Loveless (1981), a biker film that she co-directed with Monty Montgomery. It featured Willem Dafoe in his first starring role. Next, she directed Near Dark (1987), which she co-scripted with Eric Red. With this film, she began her lifelong fascination with manipulating movie conventions and genre. The main cast included three actors who had appeared in the film Aliens. In the same year, she directed a music video for the New Order song "Touched by the Hand of God"; the video is a spoof of glam metal imagery. Bigelow's subsequent films, Blue Steel, Point Break, and Strange Days, "merged her philosophically minded manipulation of pace with the market demands of mainstream film-making".

If there's specific resistance to women making movies, I just choose to ignore that as an obstacle for two reasons: I can't change my gender, and I refuse to stop making movies. It's irrelevant who or what directed a movie, the important thing is that you either respond to it or you don't. There should be more women directing; I think there's just not the awareness that it's really possible. It is.

— Kathryn Bigelow in 1990

Blue Steel starred Jamie Lee Curtis as a rookie police officer, who is stalked by a psychopathic killer, played by Ron Silver. As with Near Dark, Eric Red co-wrote the screenplay. The film, originally bankrolled for $10 million, was shot on location in New York City due to financial considerations and because Bigelow does not "like movies where you see a welfare apartment and it's the size of two football fields." Bigelow followed Blue Steel with the cult classic Point Break (1991), which starred Keanu Reeves as an FBI agent, who poses as a surfer to catch the "Ex-Presidents", a team of surfing armed robbers, led by Patrick Swayze, who wear Reagan, Nixon, LBJ, and Jimmy Carter masks when they hold up banks. Point Break was Bigelow's most profitable "studio" film, taking in about $80 million at the global box office during the year of its release, and yet it remains one of her lowest-rated films, both in commercial reviews and academic analysis. Critics argued that it conformed to some of the clichés and tired stereotypes of the action genre and that it abandoned much of the stylistic substance and subtext of Bigelow's other work.

I've spent a fair amount of time thinking about what my aptitude is, and I really think it's to explore and push the medium. It's not about breaking gender roles or genre traditions.

— Kathryn Bigelow in 2009

In 1993, she directed an episode of the TV series Wild Palms and appeared in one episode as Mazie Woiwode (uncredited). Bigelow's 1995 film Strange Days was written and produced by her ex-husband James Cameron. Despite some positive reviews, the film was a commercial failure. Furthermore, many attributed the creative vision to Cameron, diminishing Bigelow's perceived influence on the film. She directed three episodes of Homicide: Life on the Street in 1997 and 1998. Based on Anita Shreve's novel of the same name, Bigelow's 2000 film The Weight of Water is a portrait of two women trapped in suffocating relationships. In 2002, she directed K-19: The Widowmaker, starring Harrison Ford and Liam Neeson, about a group of men aboard the Soviet Union's first nuclear-powered submarine. The film fared poorly at the box office and was received with mixed reactions by critics.

=== 2008–2016: Critical acclaim and international recognition ===
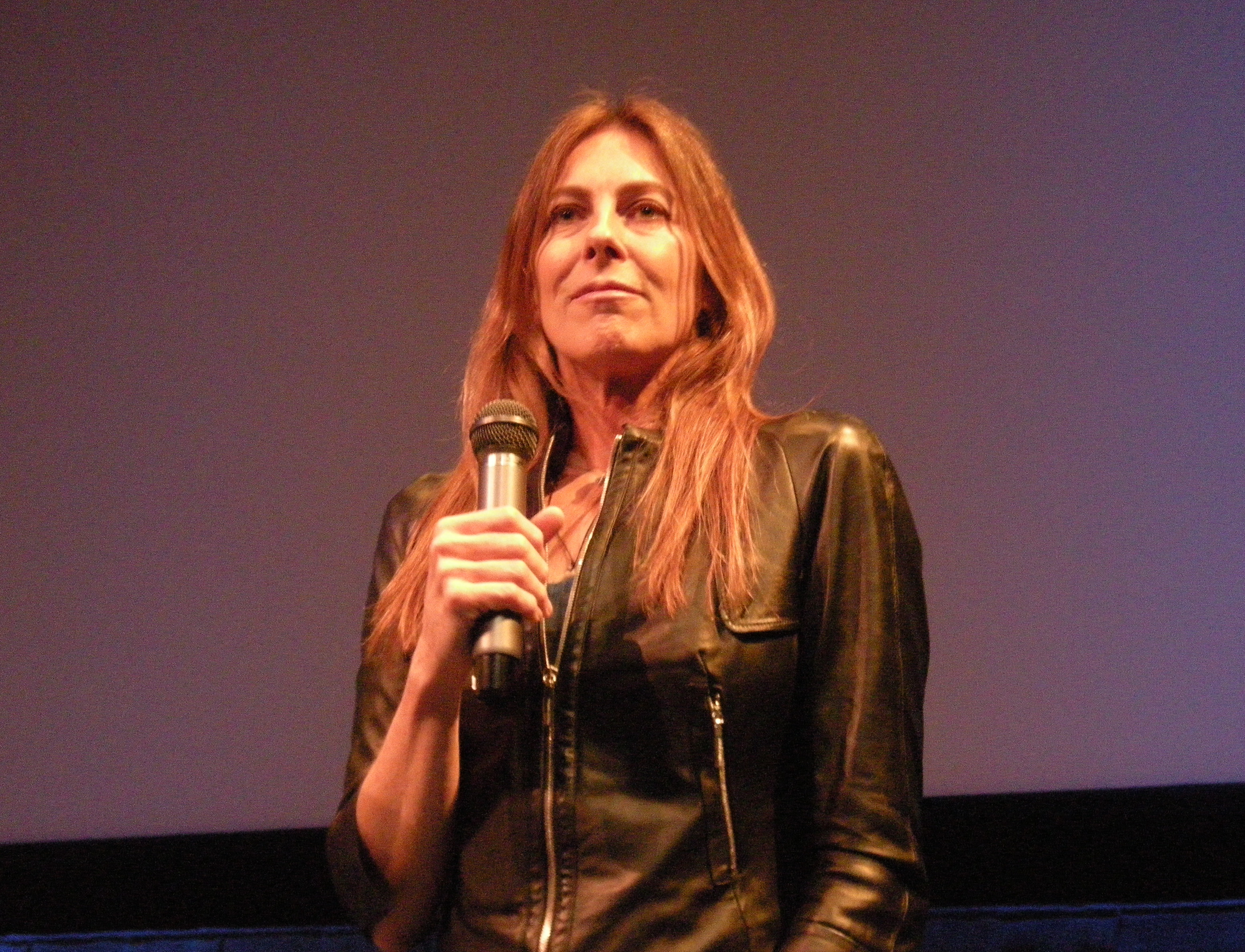
Bigelow speaking at the Seattle International Film Festival in 2009

Bigelow next directed The Hurt Locker, which was first shown at the Venice Film Festival in September 2008, was the Closing Night selection for Maryland Film Festival in May 2009, and theatrically released in the US in June 2009. It qualified for the 2010 Oscars, as it did not premiere in an Oscar-qualifying run in Los Angeles until mid-2009. Set in postinvasion Iraq, the film received "universal acclaim" (according to Metacritic) and a 97% "fresh" rating from the critics aggregated by Rotten Tomatoes. The film stars Jeremy Renner, Brian Geraghty, and Anthony Mackie, with cameos by Guy Pearce, David Morse, and Ralph Fiennes. She won the Directors Guild of America award for Outstanding Directorial Achievement in Motion Pictures (becoming the first woman to win the award) and also received a Golden Globe Award for Best Director nomination losing to James Cameron for Avatar (2009). In 2010, she won the award for Best Director and The Hurt Locker won Best Picture at the 63rd British Academy Film Awards.

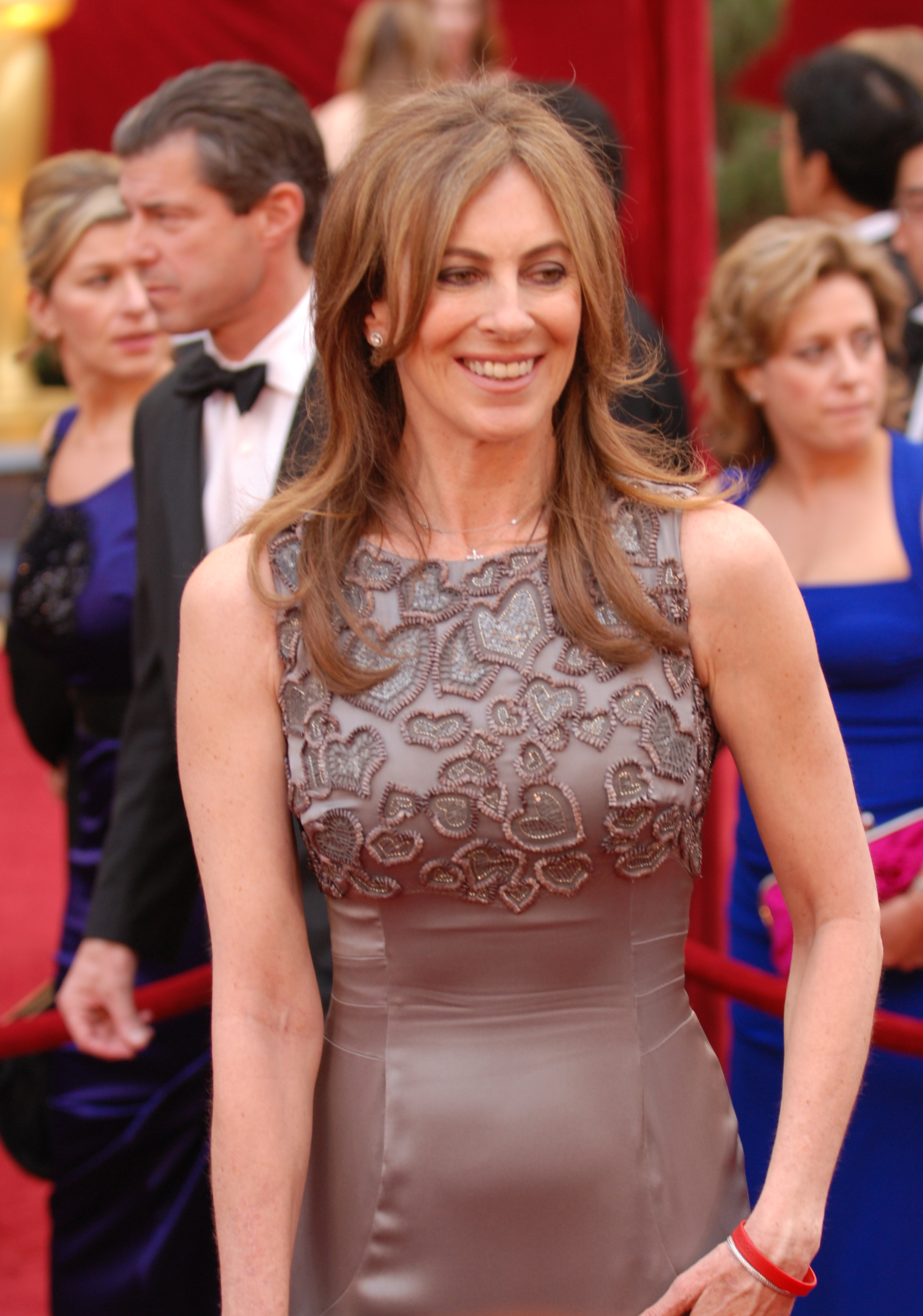
Bigelow at the 82nd Academy Awards in 2010

She became the first woman to receive an Academy Award for Best Director for The Hurt Locker. She was the fourth woman in history to be nominated for the honor, and only the second American woman. A competitor in the category was her ex-husband, James Cameron, who directed the sci-fi film Avatar. In her acceptance speech for her Academy Award, Bigelow surprised many audience members when she did not mention her status as the first woman to ever receive an Oscar for Best Director. In the past, Bigelow has refused to identify herself as a "woman filmmaker" or a "feminist filmmaker". She has been criticized for the violence in her films by writers such as Mark Salisbury, who asked in The Guardian, "Why does she make the kind of movie she makes?" and by Marcia Froelke Coburn, who asked in the Chicago Tribune, "What's a nice woman like Bigelow doing making erotic, violent, vampire movies?"

Bigelow's next film was Zero Dark Thirty, a dramatization of American efforts to find Osama bin Laden. Zero Dark Thirty was acclaimed by film critics but also attracted controversy and strong criticism for its allegedly protorture stance. Bigelow won the New York Film Critics Circle Award for Best Director for the film, making her the first woman to win the award twice. She had already won previously for directing The Hurt Locker. She was also the first woman to receive the National Board of Review Award for Best Director.

=== 2017–present ===
Bigelow collaborated with Mark Boal for the third time on the film Detroit, set during the 1967 Detroit riots. Detroit began filming in the summer of 2016 and was released in July 2017, around the time of the 50th anniversary of the riots, and on the anniversary day of the Algiers Motel incident, which is depicted in the film. John Boyega, Hannah Murray, Will Poulter, Jack Reynor, Anthony Mackie, and Joseph David-Jones starred in the film.

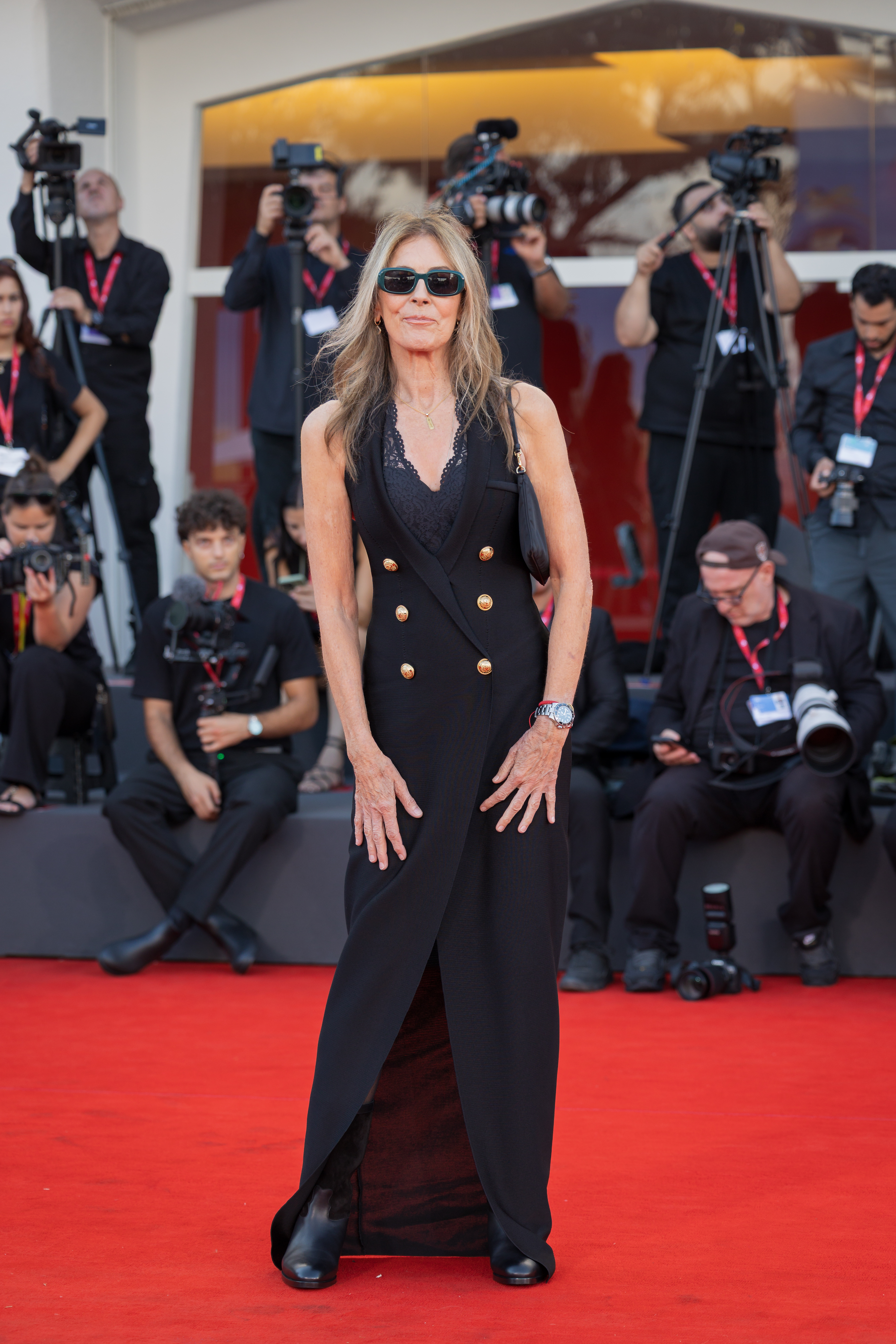
Bigelow at 82nd Venice International Film Festival

She served as executive producer of Triple Frontier, a film that she was originally going to direct. She gave up directing duties to J. C. Chandor to focus on other projects. Bigelow also directs commercials. She is represented internationally by commercial production company SMUGGLER, where she has directed commercials for the Army National Guard, Budweiser, and AT&T, some of which were broadcast during the Super Bowl. In 2022, Bigelow was nominated by the Directors Guild of America for Outstanding Directorial Achievement in Commercials for Apple's "Hollywood in Your Pocket".

In May 2024, Netflix announced that Bigelow would be directing a new feature film for the streaming platform. The film, titled A House of Dynamite, is "centered on a group of White House officials scrambling to deal with an incoming missile attack". The cast includes Idris Elba, Rebecca Ferguson, Tracy Letts, Greta Lee, and Jared Harris. A House of Dynamite had its world premiere in the main competition of the 82nd Venice International Film Festival on September 2, 2025, where it was nominated for the Golden Lion.

== Other ventures ==
In November 1976, she appeared in a political, 56-minute film, entitled "Struggle in New York", which involved conceptual artists Art & Language.

In the early 1980s, Bigelow modeled for a Gap advertisement. Her acting credits include Lizzie Borden's 1983 film Born in Flames, as a feminist newspaper editor, and as the leader of a cowgirl gang in the 1988 music video of Martini Ranch's "Reach", which was directed by James Cameron.

== Artistry ==
Bigelow has a shifting relationship with Hollywood and its conventional film standards and techniques. Her work "both satisfies and transcends the demands of formula to create cinema that's ideologically complex, viscerally thrilling, and highly personal". Social issues of gender, race, and politics are entrenched in her work of all genres.

While her films are often categorized in the action genre, she describes her style as an exploration of "film's potential to be kinetic". She often uses "purpose-built" camera equipment to create mobile shots. In many of her films, such as The Hurt Locker, Point Break, and Strange Days, she has used mobile and hand-held cameras.

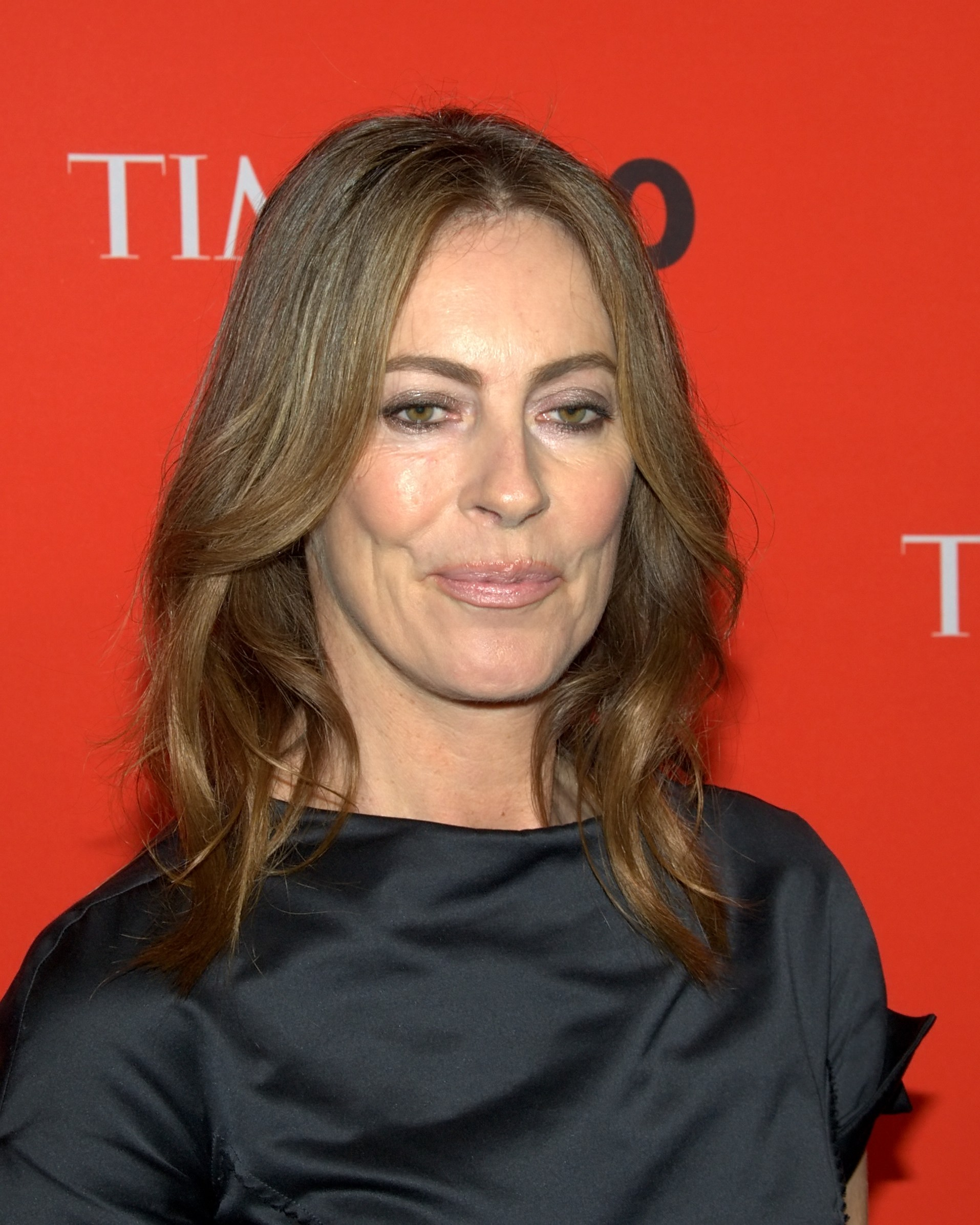
Bigelow at the Time 100 gala, 2010

Bigelow's work is characterized by extensive violence. Most of her films include violent sequences and many revolve around the theme of violence. Violence has been a staple in her films from the beginning of her career. In her first short film The Set-Up (1978), two professors deconstruct two men beating each other up and reflect on the "fascistic appeal of screen violence". For this film Bigelow asked the two actors to actually beat each other up in the film's all-night shoot. This interest in violence seeped into her first full-length feature film The Loveless, starring Willem Dafoe, which follows a 1950s motorcycle gang's visit to a small town and the ensuing violence that occurs. Her next film, Near Dark, follows a young boy who falls in love with a vampire after being bitten by her. The film was conceived as a Western but the genre was so unpopular at the time that Bigelow had to adjust her script and invert the genre conventions. She still used the violent staples of the genre including sieges, shoot-outs, and horseback chases. It is regarded for its combination of the Western and horror genre and its exploration of "homosexuality and 'white America's illusion of safety and control'". The film became a cult classic within the horror genre community. Bigelow herself saw it screened in Greenwich Village with a horror genre crowd.

Blue Steel was her first venture into the action film genre, with which she has stayed throughout her career and has found most success. The film revolves around a female police officer who is falsely accused of a murder and who in the process of clearing her name investigates a killing spree connected to the original murder. Similarly to Near Dark, Bigelow inverts the typical action genre conventions by placing a female protagonist at the center. The film digs deeply into feminist issues and is often taught and studied by feminist film scholars. Her next film Point Break, starring Keanu Reeves and Patrick Swayze, was her breakout film in terms of mainstream success. The film follows a detective who goes undercover in a suspected criminal gang of surfers who primarily rob banks. It marks the first time that Bigelow used lengthy Steadicam tracking shots. It was also her biggest financial success yet, grossing $83.5 million worldwide with a budget of $24 million. Although her next film, Strange Days, which ruminates on the relationships between media, sex, race, class, and technology, had a budget of $42 million, it only grossed just under $8 million. Although the film flopped, it led Bigelow and her team to spend over a year developing a camera that intended to approximate human vision.

The commercial failure of Strange Days was followed by a stream of commercial and critical flops for Bigelow. Her films The Weight of Water and K-19: The Widowmaker received negative reviews from critics and little attention from the general public. With her independently produced film The Hurt Locker she made a commercial and critical comeback. This film was her transition into political and historical film. The Hurt Locker, which follows members of a bomb squad serving in the Iraq War, was Bigelow's first venture into pseudo-documentary style film, abandoning the aesthetic stylization found in Strange Days and Near Dark. The film utilizes the genre's tendency to use quick cuts, shaky camera, and rapid zooms. It also breaks with the conventional narrative structures of her previous films, following a more unorganized and experimental narrative structure. Her next film, Zero Dark Thirty, is widely seen as a direct extension of The Hurt Locker, going further in-depth of historical analysis and addressing issues of geopolitics and American foreign policy. The film was criticised for its depiction of the CIA's torture practices.

Throughout her career, Bigelow has tended to go to extremes for her films. In Point Break, while filming the skydiving scene, Bigelow was on the airplane with a parachute on, as she filmed Patrick Swayze throw himself into the sky. During surfing scenes in the same film, she would either paddle on a longboard or lean over a nearby boat as far as possible to get shots of Keanu Reeves surfing. For the opening of Strange Days she controlled a crane that dropped a camera man off the edge of a tall building. For The Hurt Locker, Bigelow filmed in Jordan in up to 130 °F (54 °C) heat.

== Recognition ==
Time magazine named her one of the 100 most influential people in the world in 2010.

== Personal life ==
Bigelow was married to director James Cameron from 1989 to 1991, and they have remained friends since the divorce.

== Filmography ==
=== Film ===
Year	Title				
Year	Title	Director	Producer	Writer	Notes
1981	The Loveless	Yes	No	Yes	Co-written and co-directed with Monty Montgomery
1987	Near Dark	Yes	No	Yes	Co-written with Eric Red
1990	Blue Steel	Yes	No	Yes	Co-written with Eric Red
1991	Point Break	Yes	No	Uncredited	Co-written with W. Peter Iliff and James Cameron (uncredited)
1995	Strange Days	Yes	No	No	
1996	Undertow	No	No	Yes	Co-written with Eric Red
2000	The Weight of Water	Yes	No	No	
2002	K-19: The Widowmaker	Yes	Yes	No	
2008	The Hurt Locker	Yes	Yes	No	
2012	Zero Dark Thirty	Yes	Yes	No	
2017	Detroit	Yes	Yes	No	
2025	A House of Dynamite	Yes	Yes	No	

Executive producer

- Cartel Land (2015)
- Triple Frontier (2019)

=== Television ===
Year	Title	Episode(s)
1993	Wild Palms	"Rising Sons"
1998-1999	Homicide: Life on the Street	"Fallen Heroes"
1998-1999	Homicide: Life on the Street	"Lines of Fire"
2004	Karen Sisco	"He Was a Friend of Mine"

=== Other works ===
Director

Year	Title	Notes
1978	The Set-Up	Short film
1987	"Touched by the Hand of God" – New Order	Music video
1995	"Selling Jesus" – Skunk Anansie	Music video
2014	Last Days	Short film / PSA

Actress

Year	Title	Role	Notes
1983	Born in Flames	Kathy Larson	
1988	"Reach" – Martini Ranch		Music video

== See also ==
- List of Academy Award records
- List of accolades received by The Hurt Locker
- List of accolades received by Zero Dark Thirty
- List of female film and television directors
