= Boston Society of Film Critics Award for Best Director =

Annual US film award

The Boston Society of Film Critics Award for Best Director is an annual film award given by the Boston Society of Film Critics.

== Winners ==
=== 1980s ===
Year	Winner	Film
1980	Roman Polanski	Tess
1981	Steven Spielberg	Raiders of the Lost Ark
1982	Steven Spielberg	E.T. the Extra-Terrestrial
1983	Paolo Taviani and Vittorio Taviani	The Night of the Shooting Stars (La notte di San Lorenzo)
1984	Bertrand Tavernier	A Sunday in the Country (Un dimanche à la campagne)
1985	John Huston	Prizzi's Honor
1986	David Lynch	Blue Velvet
1986	Oliver Stone	Platoon
1987	Stanley Kubrick	Full Metal Jacket
1988	Stephen Frears	Dangerous Liaisons
1989	Woody Allen	Crimes and Misdemeanors

=== 1990s ===
Year	Winner	Film
1990	Martin Scorsese	Goodfellas
1991	Jonathan Demme	The Silence of the Lambs
1992	Robert Altman	The Player
1993	Steven Spielberg	Schindler's List
1994	Quentin Tarantino	Pulp Fiction
1995	Ang Lee	Sense and Sensibility
1996	Mike Leigh	Secrets & Lies
1997	Curtis Hanson	L.A. Confidential
1998	John Boorman	The General
1999	David O. Russell	Three Kings

=== 2000s ===
Year	Winner	Film
2000	Cameron Crowe	Almost Famous
2001	David Lynch	Mulholland Drive
2002	Roman Polanski	The Pianist
2003	Sofia Coppola	Lost in Translation
2004	Zhang Yimou	House of Flying Daggers (Shi mian mai fu)
2005	Ang Lee	Brokeback Mountain
2006	Martin Scorsese	The Departed
2007	Julian Schnabel	The Diving Bell and the Butterfly (Le scaphandre et le papillon)
2008	Gus Van Sant	Milk
2008	Gus Van Sant	Paranoid Park
2009	Kathryn Bigelow	The Hurt Locker

=== 2010s ===
Year	Winner	Film
2010	David Fincher	The Social Network
2011	Martin Scorsese	Hugo
2012	Kathryn Bigelow	Zero Dark Thirty
2013	Steve McQueen	12 Years a Slave
2014	Richard Linklater	Boyhood
2015	Todd Haynes	Carol
2016	Damien Chazelle	La La Land
2017	Paul Thomas Anderson	Phantom Thread
2018	Lynne Ramsay	You Were Never Really Here
2019	Bong Joon-ho	Parasite

=== 2020s ===
Year	Winner	Film
2020	Chloé Zhao	Nomadland
2021	Ryusuke Hamaguchi	Drive My Car
2022	Todd Field	Tár
2023	Jonathan Glazer	The Zone of Interest
2024	Sean Baker	Anora
2025	Ryan Coogler	Sinners

== Multiple wins ==
- 3 – Martin Scorsese, Steven Spielberg
- 2 – Kathryn Bigelow, David Lynch, Roman Polanski, Ang Lee
