= Toronto Film Critics Association Awards 2009 =

Annual Canadian film awards ceremony

13th TFCA Awards

December 16, 2009

Best Film:
Hunger
Inglourious Basterds

The 13th Toronto Film Critics Association Awards, honoring the best in film for 2009, were given on December 16, 2009.

== Winners ==
- Best Actor:
  - Nicolas Cage – Bad Lieutenant: Port of Call New Orleans

Runners-Up: George Clooney – Up in the Air, Michael Fassbender – Hunger, Colin Firth – A Single Man and Viggo Mortensen – The Road

- Best Actress:
  - Carey Mulligan – An Education

Runners-Up: Arta Dobroshi – Lorna's Silence and Meryl Streep – Julie & Julia

- Best Animated Film:
  - Fantastic Mr. Fox

Runners-Up: Coraline and Up

- Best Director:
  - Kathryn Bigelow – The Hurt Locker

Runners-Up: Steve McQueen – Hunger and Quentin Tarantino – Inglourious Basterds

- Best Documentary Film:
  - The Cove

Runners-Up: Anvil! The Story of Anvil and The Beaches of Agnès

- Best Film (tie):
  - Hunger
  - Inglourious Basterds

Runner-Up: The Hurt Locker

- Best First Feature:
  - Hunger

Runners-Up: District 9 and (500) Days of Summer

- Best Foreign Language Film:
  - The White Ribbon • Austria

Runner-Up: Police, Adjective • Romania and Summer Hours • France

- Best Screenplay (tie):
  - Inglourious Basterds – Quentin Tarantino
  - Up in the Air – Jason Reitman and Sheldon Turner

Runner-Up: A Serious Man – Joel and Ethan Coen

- Best Supporting Actor:
  - Christoph Waltz – Inglourious Basterds

Runners-Up: Christian McKay – Me and Orson Welles and Timothy Olyphant – A Perfect Getaway

- Best Supporting Actress:
  - Anna Kendrick – Up in the Air

Runners-Up: Vera Farmiga – Up in the Air and Mo'Nique – Precious

- Jay Scott Prize for Emerging Talent:
  - Xavier Dolan
- Rogers Canadian Film Award:
  - Polytechnique

Runners-Up: The Necessities of Life and Pontypool
