= Austin Film Critics Association Awards 2009 =

Annual US film awards ceremony

5th AFCA Awards

Best Film:
The Hurt Locker

The 5th Austin Film Critics Association Awards, honoring the best in filmmaking for 2009, were announced on December 15, 2009.

== Top 10 Films ==
1. The Hurt Locker
2. Star Trek
3. Up
4. A Serious Man
5. Up in the Air
6. Avatar
7. Inglourious Basterds
8. District 9
9. Where the Wild Things Are
10. Moon and The Messenger (TIE)

== Top 10 Films of the Decade ==
1. Eternal Sunshine of the Spotless Mind
2. There Will Be Blood
3. The Lord of the Rings
4. The Dark Knight
5. Requiem for a Dream
6. Kill Bill
7. No Country for Old Men
8. The Incredibles
9. Children of Men
10. Memento and The Departed (TIE)

== Winners ==
- Best Film:
  - The Hurt Locker
- Best Director:
  - Kathryn Bigelow – The Hurt Locker
- Best Actor:
  - Colin Firth – A Single Man
- Best Actress:
  - Mélanie Laurent – Inglourious Basterds
- Best Supporting Actor:
  - Christoph Waltz – Inglourious Basterds
- Best Supporting Actress:
  - Anna Kendrick – Up in the Air
- Best Original Screenplay:
  - Inglourious Basterds – Quentin Tarantino
- Best Adapted Screenplay:
  - Up in the Air – Jason Reitman and Sheldon Turner
- Best Cinematography:
  - The Hurt Locker – Barry Ackroyd
- Best Original Score:
  - Up – Michael Giacchino
- Best Foreign Language Film:
  - Sin Nombre • Mexico / United States
- Best Documentary:
  - Anvil! The Story of Anvil
- Best Animated Feature:
  - Up
- Best First Film:
  - Neill Blomkamp – District 9
- Breakthrough Artist Award:
  - Christian McKay – Me and Orson Welles
- Austin Film Award:
  - Me and Orson Welles – Richard Linklater
