= 2009 New York Film Critics Circle Awards =

75th New York Film Critics Circle Awards

75th NYFCC Awards

January 11, 2010

Best Picture:
The Hurt Locker

The 75th New York Film Critics Circle Awards, honoring the best in film for 2009, were announced on 14 December 2009 and presented on 11 January 2010.

== Winners ==
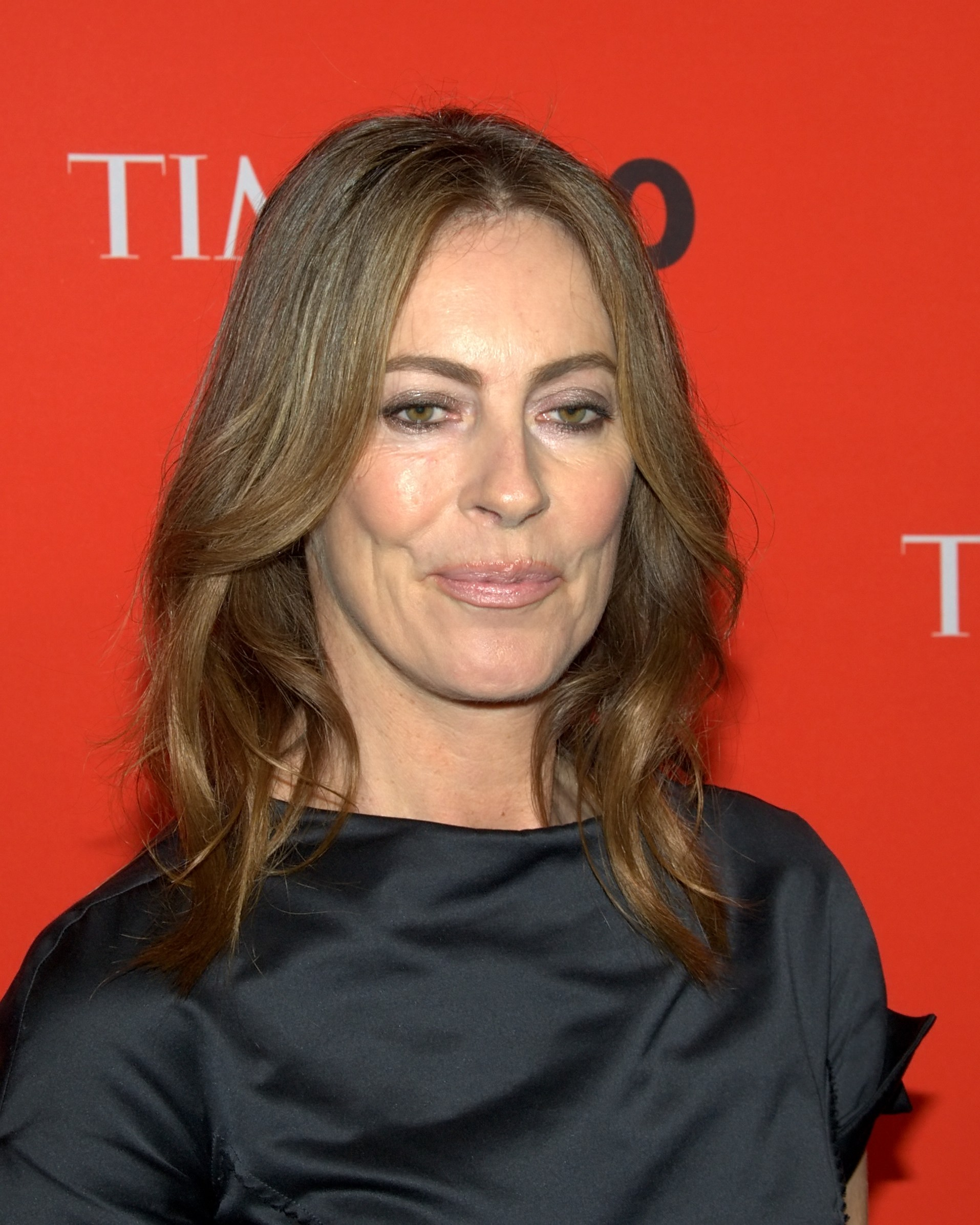
Kathryn Bigelow, Best Director winner

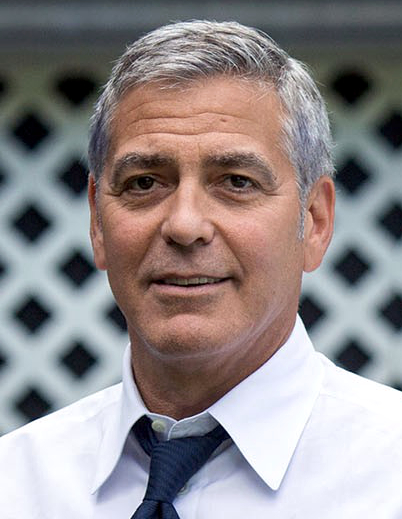
George Clooney, Best Actor winner

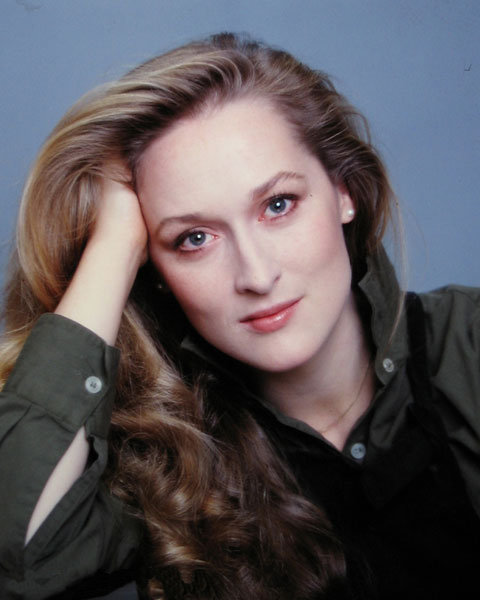
Meryl Streep, Best Actress winner

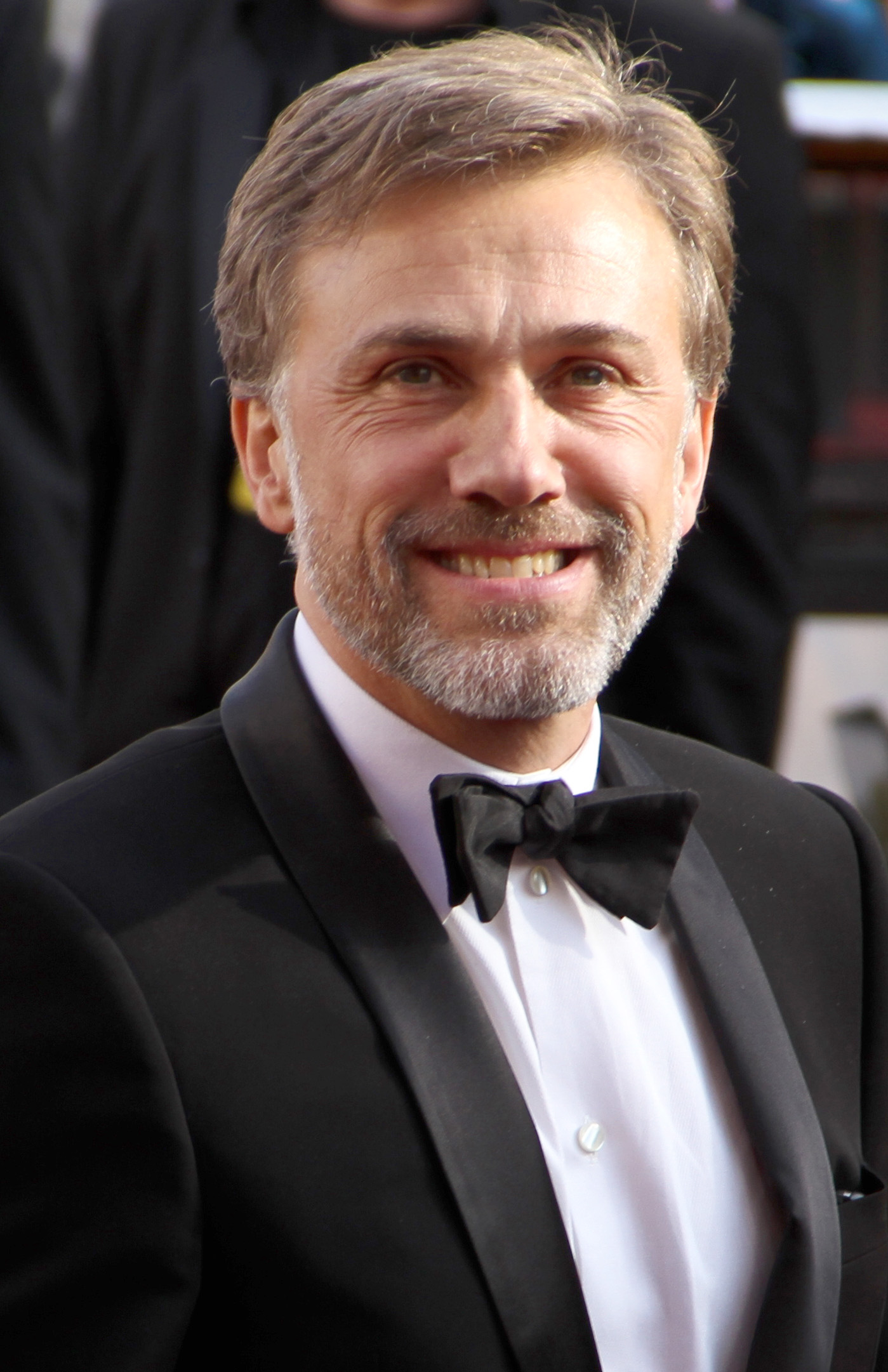
Christoph Waltz, Best Supporting Actor winner

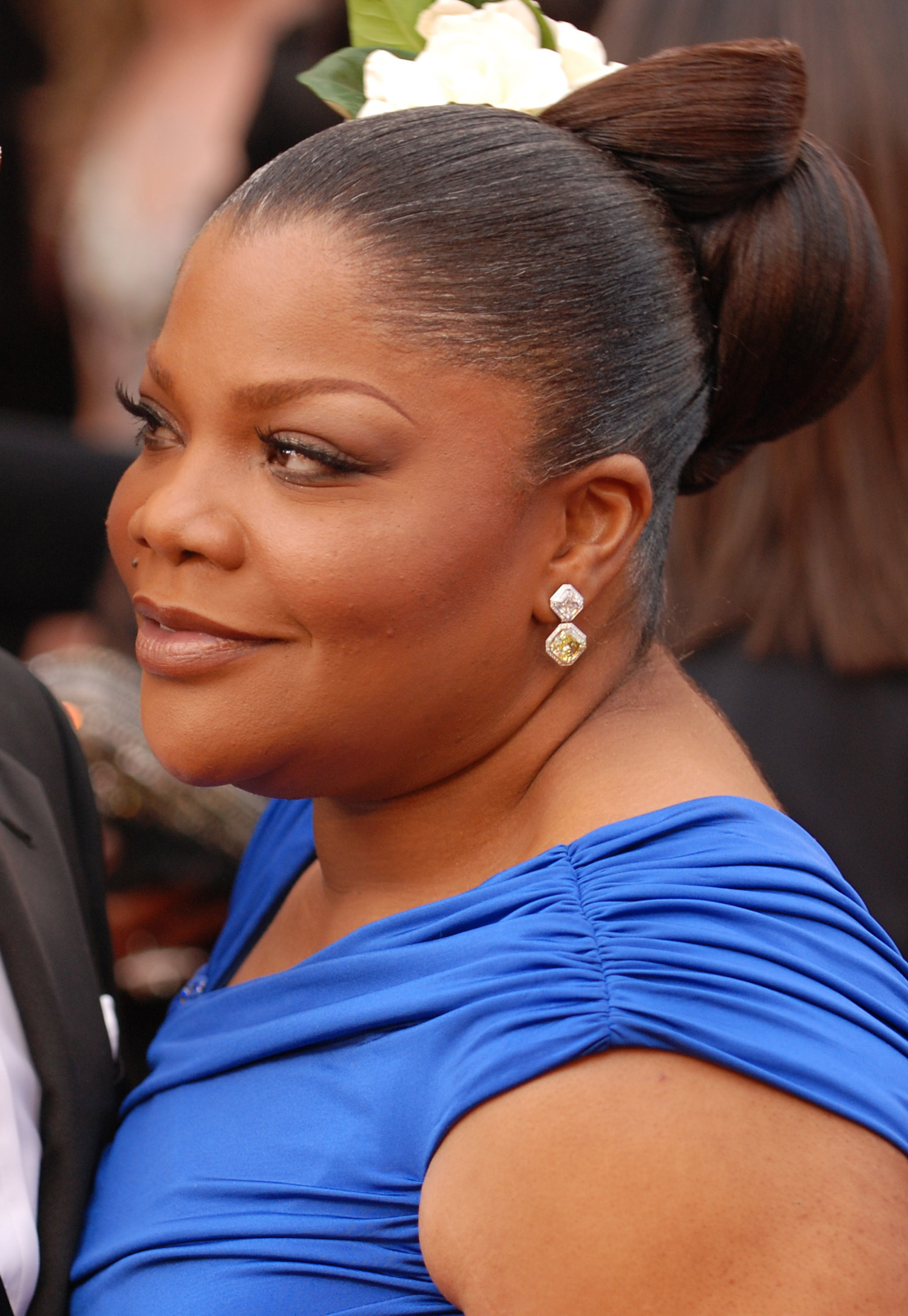
Mo'Nique, Best Supporting Actress winner

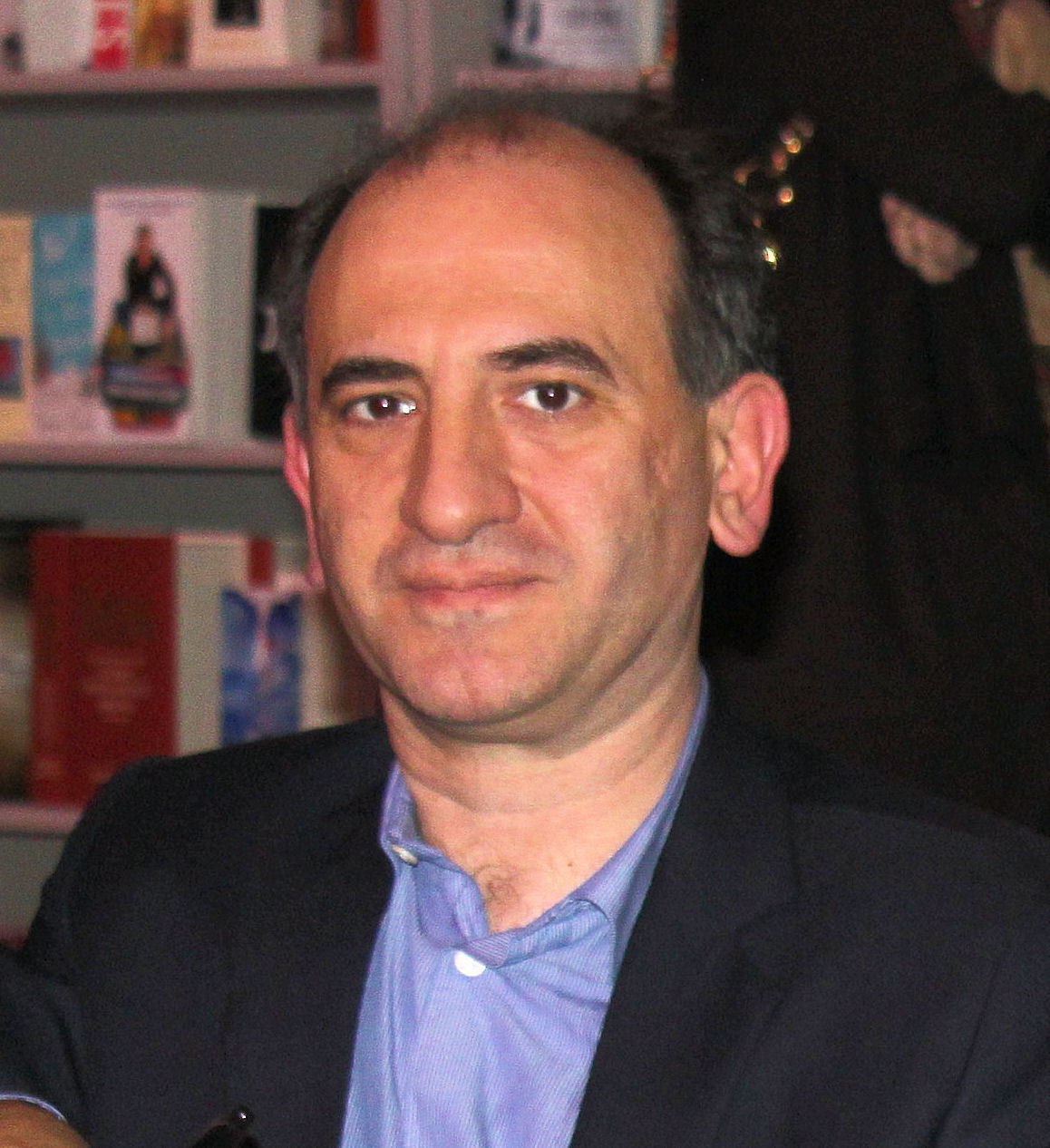
Armando Iannucci, Best Screenplay co-winner

=== Best Actor ===
1. George Clooney – Fantastic Mr. Fox and Up in the Air
2. Jeff Bridges – Crazy Heart
3. Jeremy Renner – The Hurt Locker

=== Best Actress ===
1. Meryl Streep – Julie & Julia
2. Tilda Swinton – Julia
3. Carey Mulligan – An Education

=== Best Animated Film ===
1. Fantastic Mr. Fox
2. Up
3. Coraline

=== Best Cinematography ===
1. Christian Berger – The White Ribbon (Das weiße Band)
2. Mauro Fiore – Avatar
3. Roger Deakins – A Serious Man

=== Best Director ===
1. Kathryn Bigelow – The Hurt Locker
2. Wes Anderson – Fantastic Mr. Fox
3. Quentin Tarantino – Inglourious Basterds

=== Best Film ===
1. The Hurt Locker
2. Up in the Air
3. Fantastic Mr. Fox

=== Best First Film ===
- Steve McQueen – Hunger

=== Best Foreign Language Film ===
1. Summer Hours (L'heure d'été) • France
2. Broken Embraces (Los abrazos rotos) • Spain
3. Everlasting Moments (Maria Larssons eviga ögonblick) • Sweden

=== Best Non-Fiction Film ===
1. Of Time and the City
2. Anvil! The Story of Anvil
3. Tyson

=== Best Screenplay ===
1. Armando Iannucci, Jesse Armstrong, Simon Blackwell, and Tony Roche – In the Loop
2. Jason Reitman and Sheldon Turner – Up in the Air
3. Quentin Tarantino – Inglourious Basterds

=== Best Supporting Actor ===
1. Christoph Waltz – Inglourious Basterds
2. Christian McKay – Me and Orson Welles
3. Peter Capaldi – In the Loop

=== Best Supporting Actress ===
1. Mo'Nique – Precious
2. Vera Farmiga – Up in the Air
3. Anna Kendrick – Up in the Air

=== Special Award ===
- Andrew Sarris
