= Me and Orson Welles (soundtrack) =

Me and Orson Welles (Original Motion Picture Soundtrack)

Soundtrack album by various artists
- Released: November 24, 2009
- Recorded: Various times
- Genre: Film soundtrack
- Length: 56:47
- Label: Decca

Me and Orson Welles (Original Motion Picture Soundtrack) is the soundtrack to the 2008 film Me and Orson Welles directed by Richard Linklater starring Zac Efron, Christian McKay and Claire Danes. The soundtrack featured selections of late 1930s songs and orchestral performances, led by Benny Goodman, Louis Armstrong, Count Basie, Jools Holland, James Langton amongst others. The soundtrack was released through Decca Records on November 24, 2009.

== Background ==
Me and Orson Welles is set during the late-1930s period, a time where American jazz was prominent. Linklater and his music supervisor Marc Marot selected songs from that era, to maintain authenticity. Much of the film's music complimented of orchestral performances led by Benny Goodman, Louis Armstrong, Count Basie, Jools Holland, Tommy Dorsey and James Langton, along with musical performances by Ginger Rogers, the Mills Brothers and Fred Astaire, as well as the lead actor Christian McKay also performing the song "Let's Pretend There's a Moon". The incidental underscore is composed, arranged, orchestrated and conducted by Michael J McEvoy, who had contributed two score pieces, while his complete score was not released.

== Reception ==
Heather Phares of AllMusic found the periodic music to be fascinating and improved the film's storyline.

== Track listing ==
No.	Title	Artist(s)	Length
1.	"This Year's Kisses"	Benny Goodman and His Orchestra	2:26
2.	"I'm Shooting High"	Louis Armstrong and His Orchestra	2:49
3.	"Sing, Sing, Sing"	Benny Goodman and His Orchestra	9:15
4.	"One O'Clock Jump"	Count Basie and His Orchestra	3:02
5.	"Ode to Krupa"	Michael J. McEvoy	1:17
6.	"Let's Pretend There's a Moon" (Instrumental)	Jools Holland and His Rhythm and Blues Orchestra	3:00
7.	"Let's Pretend There's a Moon"	Christian McKay	0:26
8.	"Let Yourself Go"	Ginger Rogers	2:31
9.	"Solitude"	The Mills Brothers	3:18
10.	"Aftershow Jam"	Michael J. McEvoy	1:56
11.	"They Can't Take That Away from Me"	Fred Astaire	3:08
12.	"In a Sentimental Mood" (Instrumental)	Benny Goodman and His Orchestra	3:39
13.	"The Music Goes 'Round and Around"	Tommy Dorsey and the Clambake Seven	3:20
14.	"I Surrender Dear"	Jools Holland and His Rhythm and Blues Orchestra	3:18
15.	"You Made Me Love You (I Didn't Want to Do It)"	Jools Holland and His Rhythm and Blues Orchestra	2:54
16.	"Have You Met Miss Jones?"	James Langton and His Solid Senders	3:01
17.	"Sing, Sing, Sing"	James Langton and His Solid Senders	7:27
Total length:			56:47

== Charts ==
Chart (2009)	Peak position
UK Compilation Albums (OCC)	78
UK Jazz and Blues Albums (OCC)	30
UK Soundtrack Albums (OCC)	45
US Billboard 200	114
US Jazz Albums (Billboard)	46
US Top Soundtracks (Billboard)	25
