= Houston Film Critics Society Awards 2009 =

Annual US film awards ceremony

3rd Houston Film Critics Society Awards
- Date: December 19, 2009
- Location: Museum of Fine Arts; Houston, Texas
- Country: United States
- Presented by: Houston Film Critics Society
- Website: houstonfilmcritics.com/awards

The 3rd Houston Film Critics Society Awards nominations were announced on the December 17, 2009. The 2009 awards were given out at a ceremony held at the Museum of Fine Arts on December 19, 2009. The awards are presented annually by the Houston Film Critics Society based in Houston, Texas.

== Winners and nominees ==
Winners are listed first and highlighted with boldface

Best Picture	Best Foreign Language Film
**The Hurt Locker**; (500) Days of Summer; Avatar; District 9; Inglourious Basterds; Invictus; Precious; Star Trek; Up; Up in the Air	**Sin Nombre** • Spain; 35 Shots of Rum • Canada; Broken Embraces • Spain; Cape No. 7 • Taiwan; Red Cliff • China; The Stoning of Soraya M. • United States/Iran; Summer Hours • France
Best Performance by an Actor in a Leading Role	Best Performance by an Actress in a Leading Role
**George Clooney** - **Up in the Air**; Jeff Bridges - Crazy Heart; Morgan Freeman - Invictus; Viggo Mortensen - The Road; Jeremy Renner - The Hurt Locker	**Carey Mulligan** - **An Education**; Sandra Bullock - The Blind Side; Abbie Cornish - Bright Star; Saoirse Ronan - The Lovely Bones; Gabourey Sidibe - Precious; Meryl Streep - Julie and Julia
Best Performance by an Actor in a Supporting Role	Best Performance by an Actress in a Supporting Role
**Christoph Waltz** - **Inglourious Basterds**; Zach Galifianakis - The Hangover; Woody Harrelson - The Messenger; Christian McKay - Me and Orson Welles; Stanley Tucci - The Lovely Bones	**Anna Kendrick** - **Up in the Air**; Penélope Cruz - Nine; Vera Farmiga - Up in the Air; Mo'Nique - Precious; Samantha Morton - The Messenger
Best Direction of a Motion Picture	Best Cinematography
**Kathryn Bigelow** - **The Hurt Locker**; James Cameron - Avatar; Lee Daniels - Precious; Clint Eastwood - Invictus; Jason Reitman - Up in the Air; Quentin Tarantino - Inglourious Basterds	**The Hurt Locker** - **Barry Ackroyd**; Avatar - Mauro Fiore and Vince Pace; The Lovely Bones - Andrew Lesnie; Nine - Dion Beebe; The Road - Javier Aguirresarobe
Best Animated Feature Film	Best Documentary Feature
**Up**; 9; Coraline; Fantastic Mr. Fox; The Princess and the Frog	**The Cove**; Burma VJ; Capitalism: A Love Story; Every Little Step; Food, Inc.; Tyson
Best Original Score	Best Original Song
**Up** - **Michael Giacchino**; Avatar - James Horner; Fantastic Mr. Fox - Alexandre Desplat; The Informant! - Marvin Hamlisch; Sherlock Holmes - Hans Zimmer	"Petey's Song" by **Jarvis Cocker**, **Noah Baumbach** and **Wes Anderson** - **Fantastic Mr. Fox**; "Almost There" by Randy Newman - The Princess and the Frog; "Cinema Italiano" by Maury Yeston - Nine; "Colorblind" by Daniel Po - Invictus; "Depression Era" by Patterson Hood - That Evening Sun; "The Weary Kind" by Ryan Bingham and T-Bone Burnett - Crazy Heart
Best Screenplay	
**Up in the Air** - **Jason Reitman** and **Sheldon Turner**; The Hurt Locker - Mark Boal; Inglourious Basterds - Quentin Tarantino; In the Loop - Jesse Armstrong; Precious - Geoffrey S. Fletcher	
