= San Diego Film Critics Society Awards 2009 =

Annual US film awards ceremony

14th SDFCS Awards

December 15, 2009

Best Film:
Inglourious Basterds

Best Director:
Quentin Tarantino
Inglourious Basterds

The 14th San Diego Film Critics Society Awards were announced on December 15, 2009.

== Winners and nominees ==
=== Best Actor ===
Colin Firth — A Single Man

- George Clooney — Up in the Air
- Matt Damon — The Informant!
- Ben Foster — The Messenger
- Christian McKay — Me and Orson Welles
- Viggo Mortensen — The Road
- Jeremy Renner — The Hurt Locker

=== Best Actress ===
Michelle Monaghan — Trucker

- Sandra Bullock — The Blind Side
- Abbie Cornish — Bright Star
- Carey Mulligan — An Education
- Meryl Streep — Julie & Julia

=== Best Animated Film ===
Up

- 9
- Coraline
- Fantastic Mr. Fox
- Monsters vs. Aliens

=== Best Cinematography ===
The Road — Javier Aguirresarobe

- Harry Potter and the Half-Blood Prince — Bruno Delbonnel
- The Hurt Locker — Barry Ackroyd
- Inglourious Basterds — Robert Richardson
- A Single Man — Eduard Grau
- The Young Victoria — Hagen Bogdanski

=== Best Director ===
Quentin Tarantino — Inglourious Basterds

- Kathryn Bigelow — The Hurt Locker
- James Cameron — Avatar
- Joel Coen and Ethan Coen — A Serious Man
- Tom Ford — A Single Man
- Jason Reitman — Up in the Air

=== Best Documentary ===
The Cove

- Anvil! The Story of Anvil
- Capitalism: A Love Story
- Food, Inc.
- Valentino: The Last Emperor

=== Best Editing ===
(500) Days of Summer — Alan Edward Bell

- District 9 — Julian Clarke
- Inglourious Basterds — Sally Menke
- The Hurt Locker — Bob Murawski
- Zombieland — Peter Amundson and Alan Baumgarten

=== Best Ensemble Performance ===
Inglourious Basterds

- Harry Potter and the Half-Blood Prince
- In the Loop
- The Messenger
- A Serious Man
- Up in the Air
- Zombieland

=== Best Film ===
Inglourious Basterds

- (500) Days of Summer
- The Hurt Locker
- A Single Man
- Up in the Air

=== Best Foreign Language Film ===
Il Divo • Italy

- Amreeka • USA/Canada
- Captain Abu Raed • Jordan
- Lemon Tree (Etz Limon) • Israel/Germany/France
- Red Cliff (Chi bi) • China
- Sin Nombre • Spain
- The Stoning of Soraya M. • USA
- Thirst (Bakjwi) • South Korea
- Treeless Mountain • South Korea

=== Best Production Design ===
Inglourious Basterds — David Wasco

- Avatar — Rick Carter and Robert Stromberg
- Harry Potter and the Half-Blood Prince — Stuart Craig
- The Imaginarium of Doctor Parnassus — Anastasia Masaro
- Me and Orson Welles — Laurence Dorman
- A Single Man — Dan Bishop
- Where the Wild Things Are — K. K. Barrett

=== Best Score ===
A Single Man — Abel Korzeniowski

- (500) Days of Summer — Mychael Danna and Rob Simonsen
- Fantastic Mr. Fox — Alexandre Desplat
- Up — Michael Giacchino
- Where the Wild Things Are — Carter Burwell and Karen O
- The Young Victoria — Ilan Eshkeri

=== Best Original Screenplay ===
Inglourious Basterds — Quentin Tarantino

- (500) Days of Summer — Scott Neustadter and Michael H. Weber
- The Messenger — Alessandro Camon and Oren Moverman
- A Serious Man — Joel Coen and Ethan Coen
- Up — Bob Peterson and Pete Docter

=== Best Adapted Screenplay ===
Fantastic Mr. Fox — Wes Anderson and Noah Baumbach

- The Informant! — Scott Z. Burns
- Julie & Julia — Nora Ephron
- A Single Man — Tom Ford and David Scearce
- Up in the Air — Jason Reitman and Sheldon Turner

=== Best Supporting Actor ===
Christoph Waltz — Inglourious Basterds

- Woody Harrelson — The Messenger
- John Malkovich — The Great Buck Howard
- Paul Schneider — Bright Star
- Stanley Tucci — The Lovely Bones

=== Best Supporting Actress ===
Samantha Morton — The Messenger

- Vera Farmiga — Up in the Air
- Anna Kendrick — Up in the Air
- Mélanie Laurent — Inglourious Basterds
- Mo'Nique — Precious

=== Body of Work ===
Woody Harrelson — The Messenger, Zombieland and 2012
