= Washington D.C. Area Film Critics Association Awards 2009 =

Annual US film awards ceremony

8th WAFCA Awards
- Date: December 7, 2009

Highlights
- Best Film: Up in the Air
- Best Director: Kathryn Bigelow for The Hurt Locker
- Best Actor: George Clooney
- Best Actress: Carey Mulligan

The 8th Washington D.C. Area Film Critics Association Awards were given on December 7, 2009.

== Winners and nominees ==
Best Film

- Up in the Air

- The Hurt Locker
- Inglourious Basterds
- Precious
- Up

Best Director

- Kathryn Bigelow – The Hurt Locker

- Lee Daniels – Precious
- Clint Eastwood – Invictus
- Jason Reitman – Up in the Air
- Quentin Tarantino – Inglourious Basterds

Best Actor

- George Clooney – Up in the Air

- Colin Firth – A Single Man
- Morgan Freeman – Invictus
- Viggo Mortensen – The Road
- Jeremy Renner – The Hurt Locker

Best Actress

- Carey Mulligan – An Education

- Sandra Bullock – The Blind Side
- Maya Rudolph – Away We Go
- Gabourey Sidibe – Precious
- Meryl Streep – Julie & Julia

Best Supporting Actor

- Christoph Waltz – Inglourious Basterds

- Woody Harrelson – The Messenger
- Anthony Mackie – The Hurt Locker
- Alfred Molina – An Education
- Stanley Tucci – Lovely Bones

Best Supporting Actress

- Mo'Nique – Precious

- Vera Farmiga – Up in the Air
- Anna Kendrick – Up in the Air
- Julianne Moore – A Single Man
- Samantha Morton – The Messenger

Best Adapted Screenplay

- Up in the Air – Jason Reitman and Sheldon Turner

- An Education – Nick Hornby
- The Blind Side – John Lee Hancock
- Precious – Geoffrey S. Fletcher
- The Road – Joe Penhall

Best Original Screenplay

- Inglourious Basterds – Quentin Tarantino

- (500) Days of Summer – Scott Neustadter and Michael H. Weber
- The Hurt Locker – Mark Boal
- A Serious Man – Joel Coen and Ethan Coen
- Up – Pete Docter, Bob Peterson, and Tom McCarthy

Best Breakthrough Performance

- Gabourey Sidibe – Precious

- Anna Kendrick – Up in the Air
- Christian McKay – Me and Orson Welles
- Carey Mulligan – An Education
- Jeremy Renner – The Hurt Locker

Best Cast

- The Hurt Locker

- Nine
- Precious
- Star Trek
- Up in the Air

Best Animated Film

- Up

- 9
- Coraline
- Fantastic Mr. Fox
- Ponyo

Best Documentary Film

- Food, Inc.

- Anvil! The Story of Anvil
- Capitalism: A Love Story
- The Cove
- Good Hair

Best Foreign Language Film

- Sin Nombre • Mexico

- Broken Embraces • Spain
- Red Cliff • China
- Summer Hours • France
- The White Ribbon • Austria-Germany

Best Art Direction

- Nine

- Lovely Bones
- Star Trek
- Where the Wild Things Are
- The Young Victoria
