= 2009 National Society of Film Critics Awards =

Annual US film awards ceremony

44th NSFC Awards

January 3, 2010

Best Film:
The Hurt Locker

The 44th National Society of Film Critics Awards, given on 3 January 2010, honored the best in film for 2009.

== Winners ==
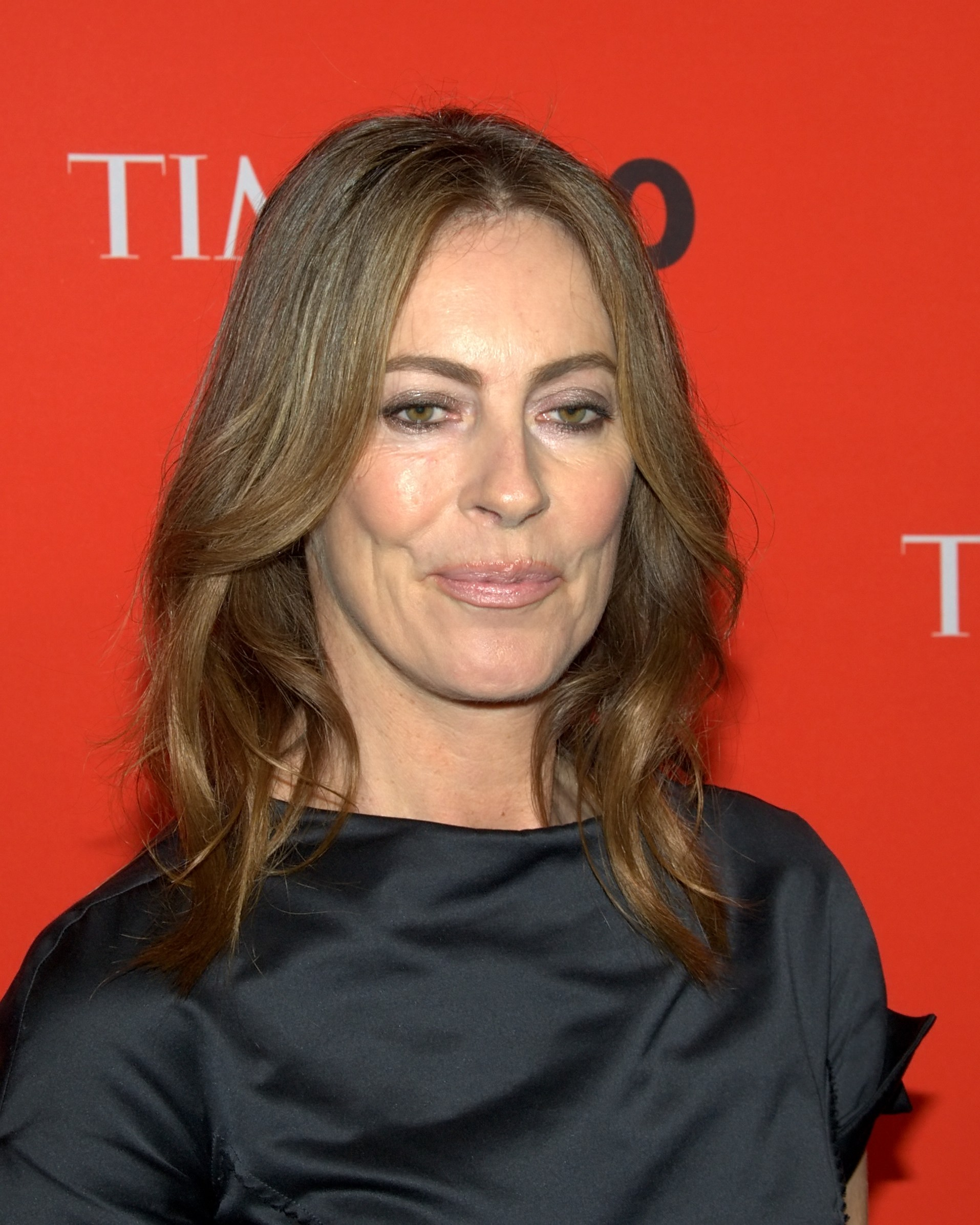
Kathryn Bigelow, Best Director winner

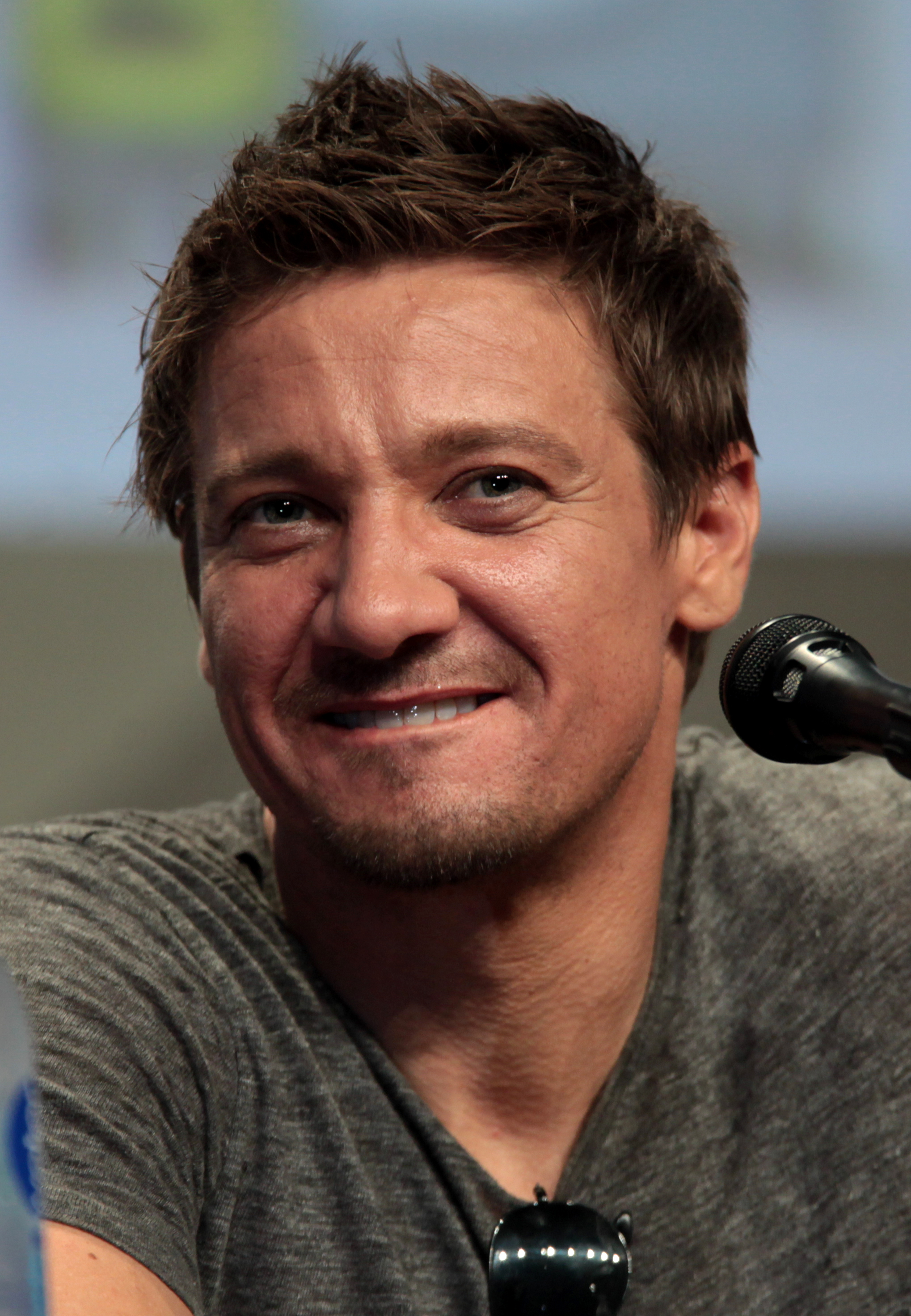
Jeremy Renner, Best Actor winner

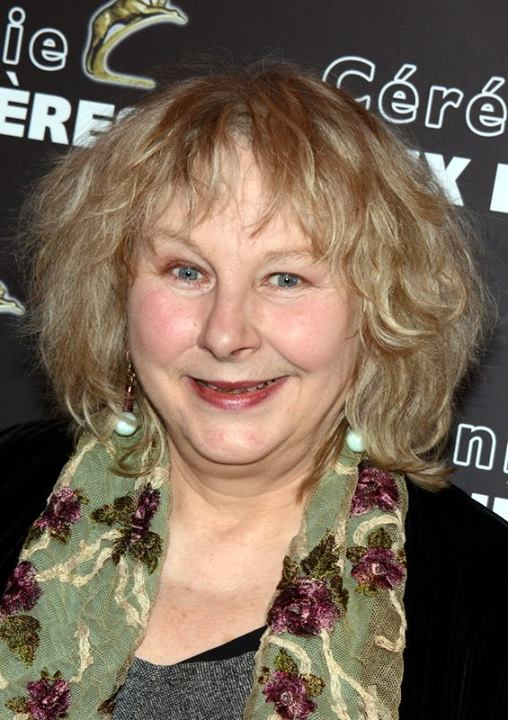
Yolande Moreau, Best Actress winner

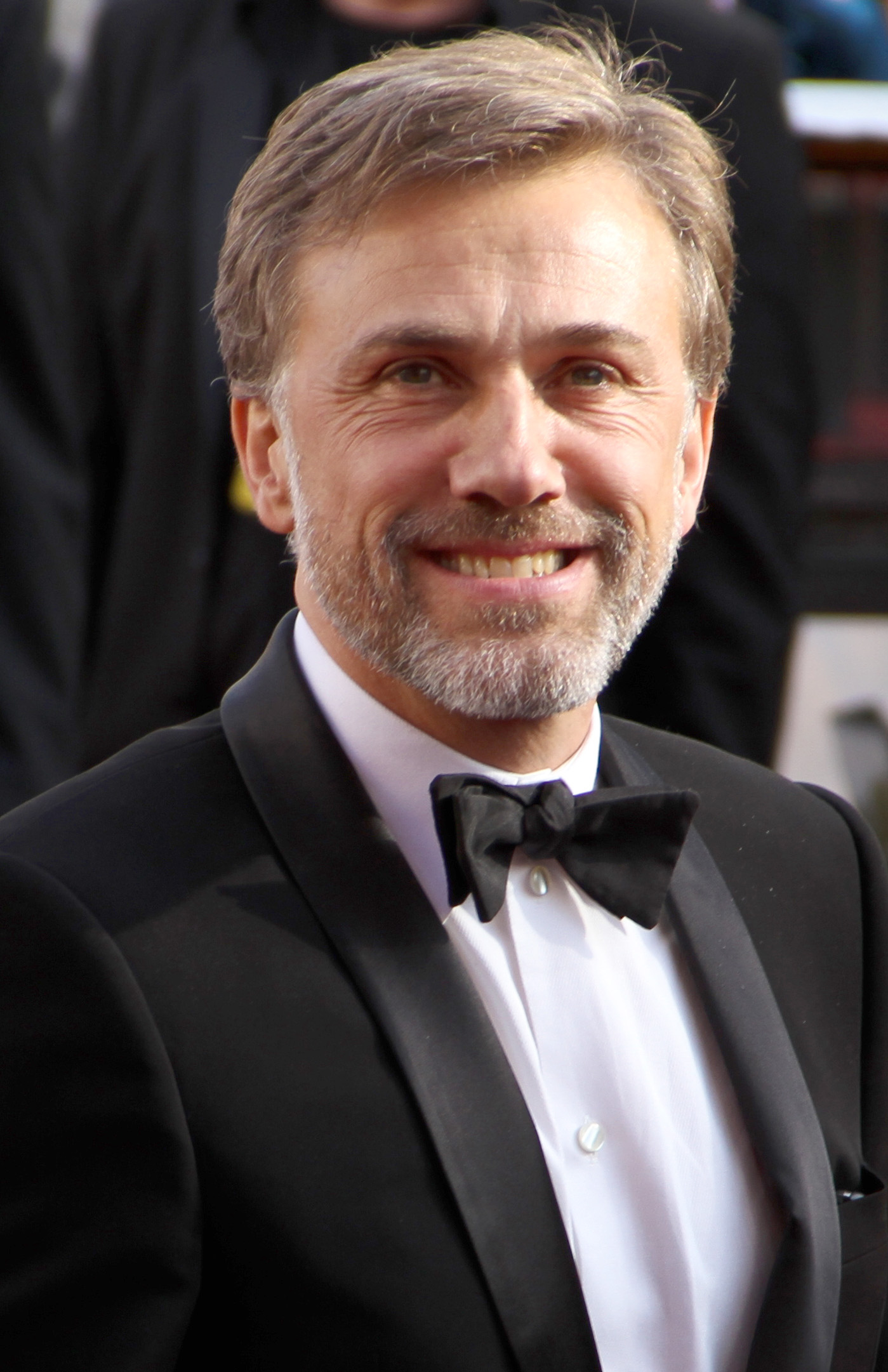
Christoph Waltz, Best Supporting Actor co-winner

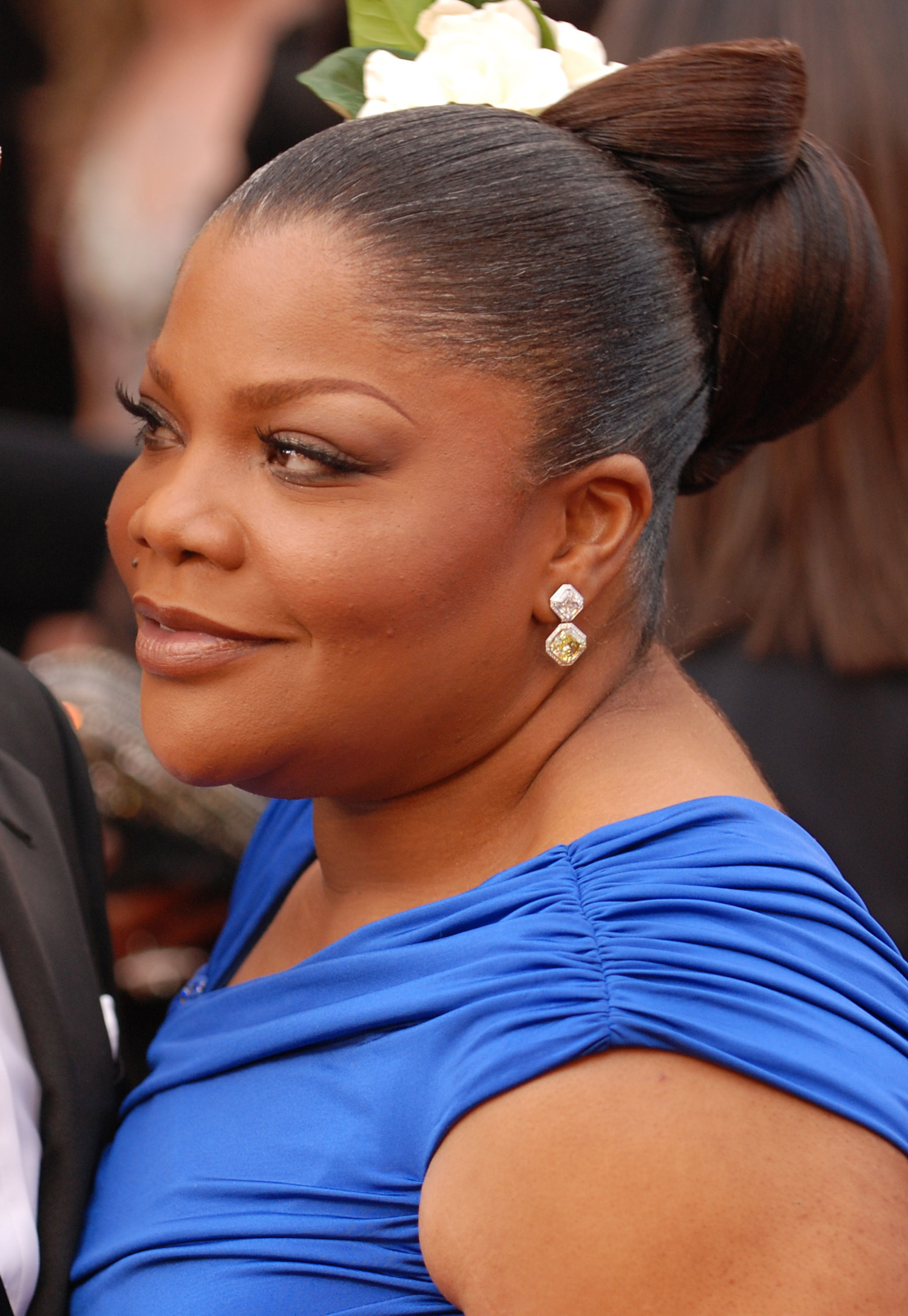
Mo'Nique, Best Supporting Actress winner

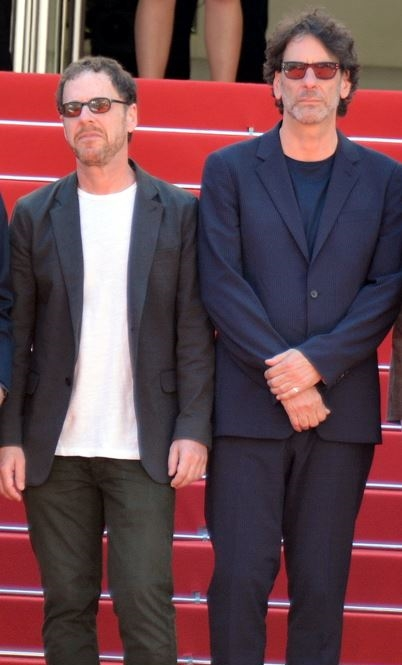
Coen brothers, Best Screenplay winners

=== Best Picture ===
1. The Hurt Locker
2. Summer Hours (L'Heure d'été)
3. Inglourious Basterds

=== Best Director ===
1. Kathryn Bigelow – The Hurt Locker
2. Olivier Assayas – Summer Hours (L'Heure d'été)
3. Wes Anderson – Fantastic Mr. Fox

=== Best Actor ===
1. Jeremy Renner – The Hurt Locker
2. Jeff Bridges – Crazy Heart
3. Nicolas Cage – Bad Lieutenant: Port of Call New Orleans

=== Best Actress ===
1. Yolande Moreau – Séraphine
2. Meryl Streep – Julie & Julia and Fantastic Mr. Fox
3. Abbie Cornish – Bright Star

=== Best Supporting Actor ===
1. Paul Schneider – Bright Star (TIE)
1. Christoph Waltz – Inglourious Basterds (TIE)
3. Christian McKay – Me and Orson Welles

=== Best Supporting Actress ===
1. Mo'Nique – Precious
2. Anna Kendrick – Up in the Air
2. Samantha Morton – The Messenger

=== Best Screenplay ===
1. Joel Coen and Ethan Coen – A Serious Man
2. Olivier Assayas – Summer Hours (L'Heure d'été)
3. Quentin Tarantino – Inglourious Basterds

=== Best Cinematography ===
1. Christian Berger – The White Ribbon (Das weiße Band - Eine deutsche Kindergeschichte)
2. Barry Ackroyd – The Hurt Locker
3. Jan Troell and Mischa Gavrjusjov – Everlasting Moments (Maria Larssons eviga ögonblick)

=== Best Production Design ===
1. Nelson Lowry – Fantastic Mr. Fox
2. Rick Carter – Avatar
3. Henry Selick – Coraline

=== Best Foreign Language Film ===
1. Summer Hours (L'Heure d'été)
2. Everlasting Moments (Maria Larssons eviga ögonblick)
3. 35 Shots of Rum (35 rhums)
3. Police, Adjective (Polițist, Adjectiv)

=== Best Non-Fiction Film ===
1. The Beaches of Agnès (Les plages d'Agnès)
2. Tyson
3. Anvil! The Story of Anvil

=== Film Heritage Awards ===
1. Restoration of Rashomon by the Academy Film Archive, National Film Center of the National Museum of Modern Art, Tokyo and Kadokawa Pictures, Inc. with funding provided by Kadokawa Culture Promotion Foundation and The Film Foundation.
2. Bruce Posner for restoration of Manhatta.
3. Treasures from American Film Archives, Vol. 4: Avant Garde 1947–1986 (National Film Preservation Foundation).
4. Warner Archive Collection.
5. The Red Shoes: Restored by UCLA Film and Television Archive with funding provided by The Film Foundation, Hollywood Foreign Press Association and the Louis B. Mayer Foundation.
6. Kino International: Avant-Garde Vol. 3: Experimental Cinema 1922–1954.
