= Dallas–Fort Worth Film Critics Association Awards 2009 =

Annual US film awards ceremony

15th Dallas–Fort Worth Film Critics Association Awards
- Date: December 16, 2009
- Location: Dallas, Texas
- Country: United States
- Presented by: Dallas–Fort Worth Film Critics Association
- Website: dfwfilmcritics.net

The 15th Dallas–Fort Worth Film Critics Association Awards honoring the best in film for 2009 were announced on December 16, 2009. These awards "recognizing extraordinary accomplishment in film" are presented annually by the Dallas–Fort Worth Film Critics Association (DFWFCA), based in the Dallas–Fort Worth metroplex region of Texas. The organization, founded in 1990, includes 33 film critics for print, radio, television, and internet publications based in north Texas. The Dallas–Fort Worth Film Critics Association began presenting its annual awards list in 1991.

Up in the Air was the DFWFCA's most awarded film of 2009 taking top honors in the Best Picture, Best Director (Jason Reitman), Best Actor (George Clooney), and Best Screenplay (Jason Reitman and Sheldon Turner) categories. This was the only film to win more than one category for 2009 although Precious garnered a Best Actress (Mo'Nique) honor as well as the Russell Smith Award from the critics association.

Along with the 11 "best of" category awards, the group also presented the Russell Smith Award to Precious as the "best low-budget or cutting-edge independent film" of the year. The award is named in honor of late Dallas Morning News film critic Russell Smith.

== Winners ==
Winners are listed first and highlighted with boldface. Other films ranked by the annual poll are listed in order. While most categories saw 5 honorees named, some categories ranged from as many as 10 (Best Film) to as few as 2 (Best Cinematography, Best Animated Film, Best Screenplay).

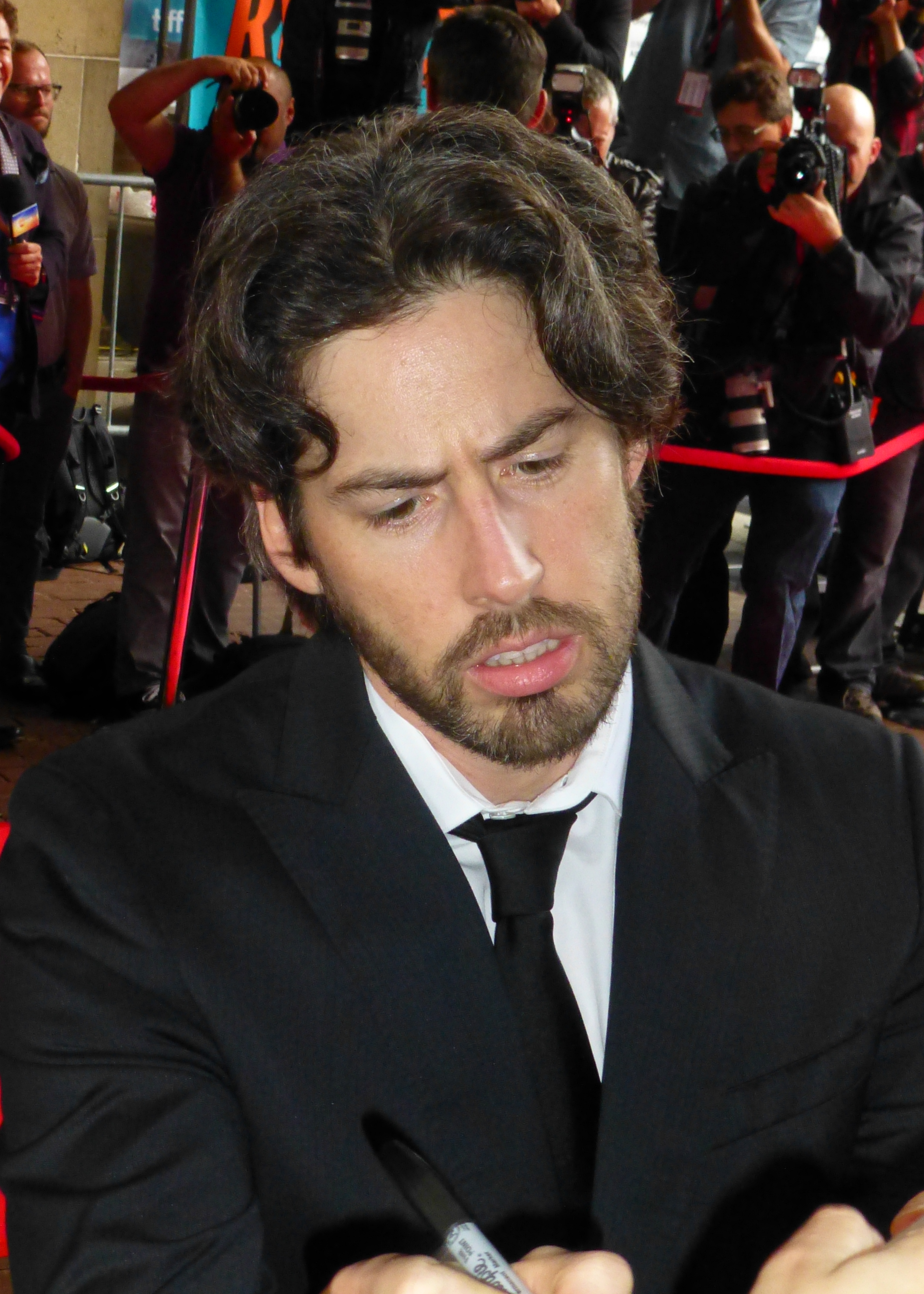
Jason Reitman, Best Director winner

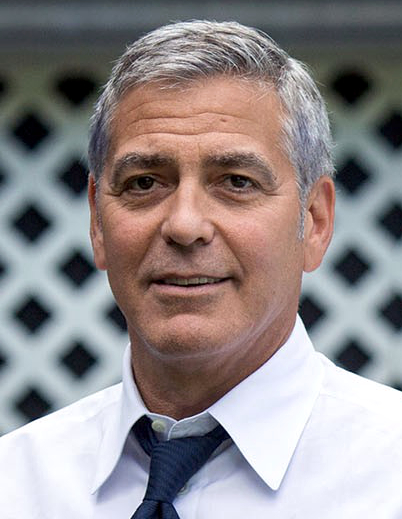
George Clooney, Best Actor winner

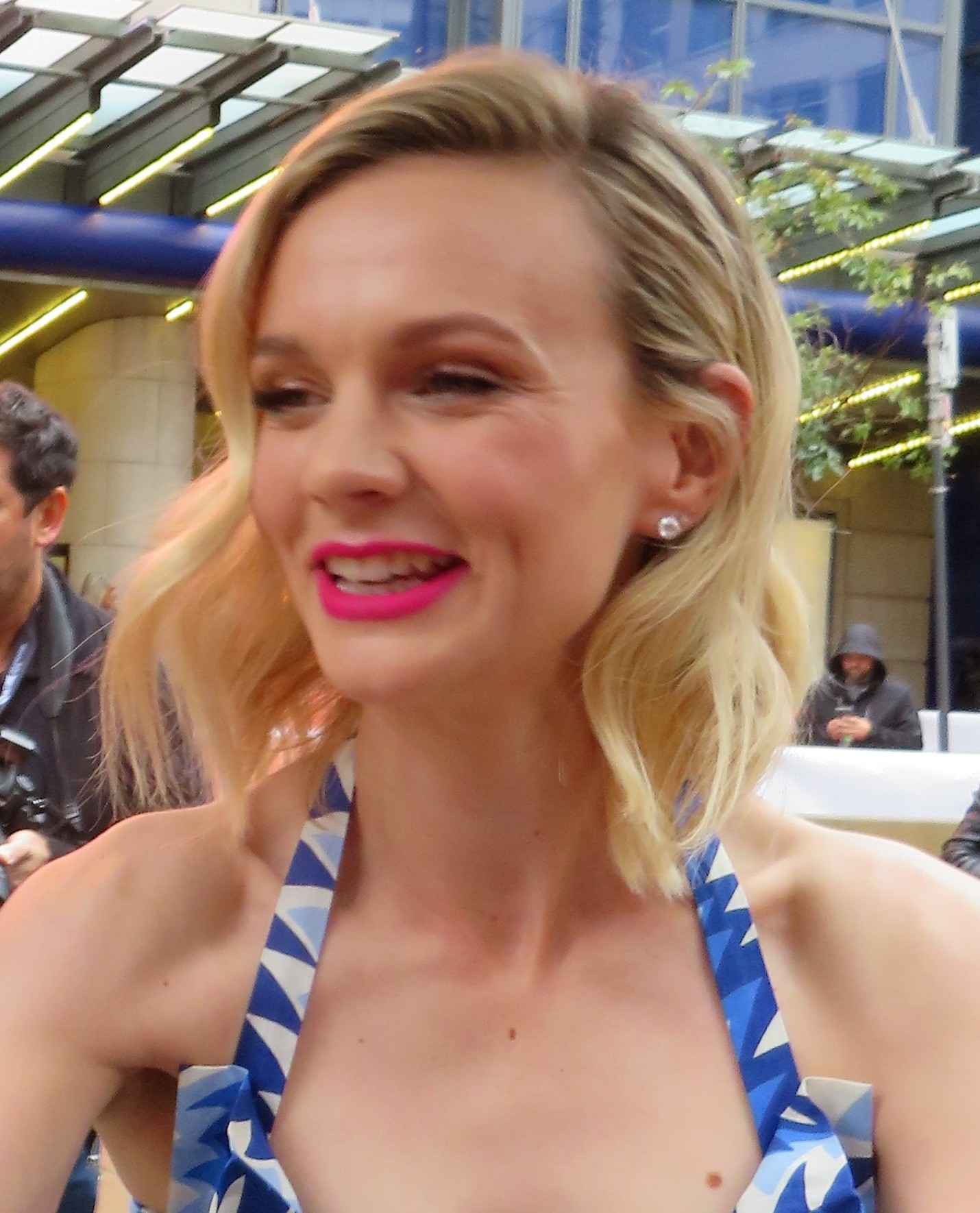
Carey Mulligan, Best Actress winner

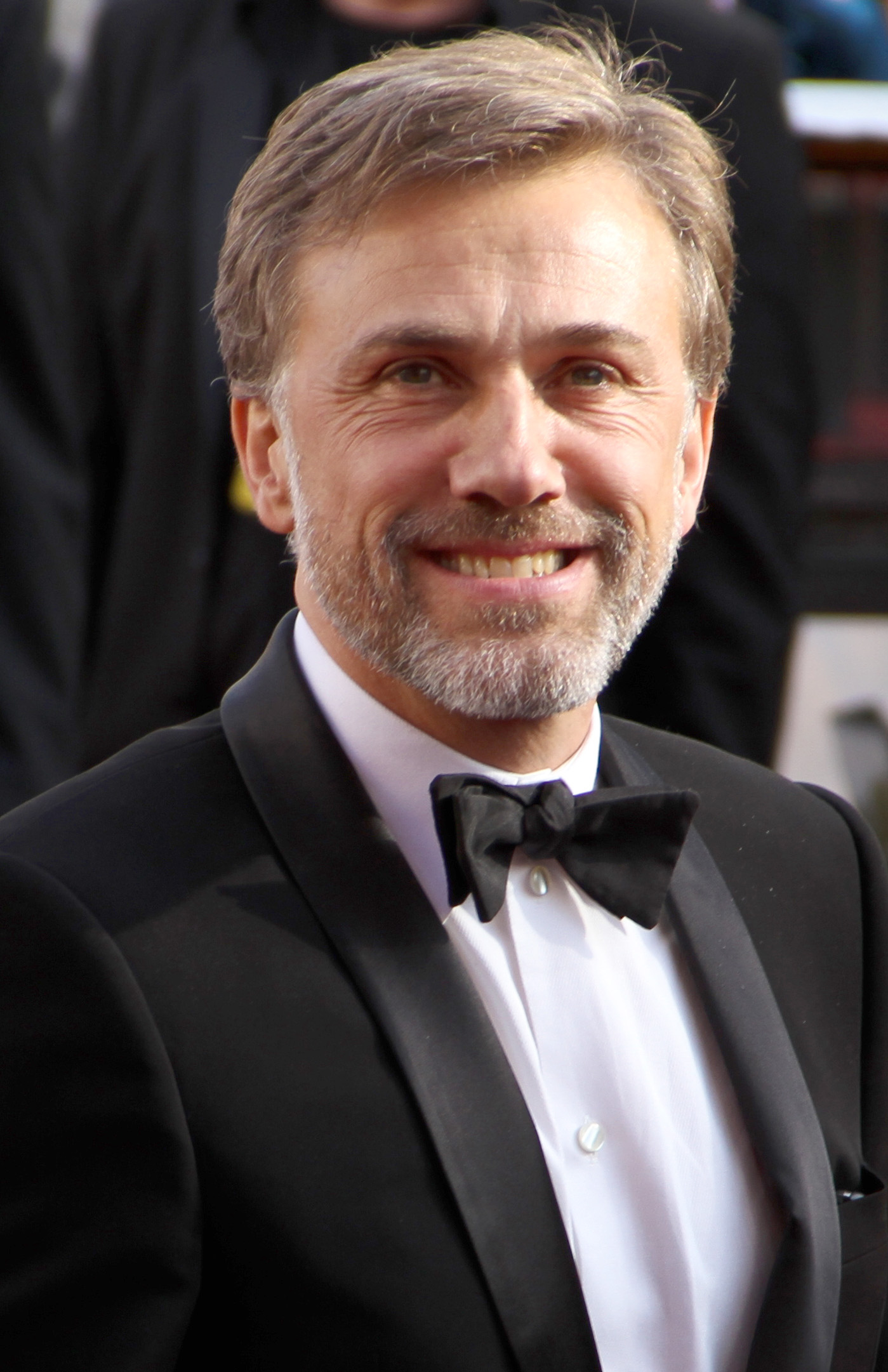
Christoph Waltz, Best Supporting Actor winner

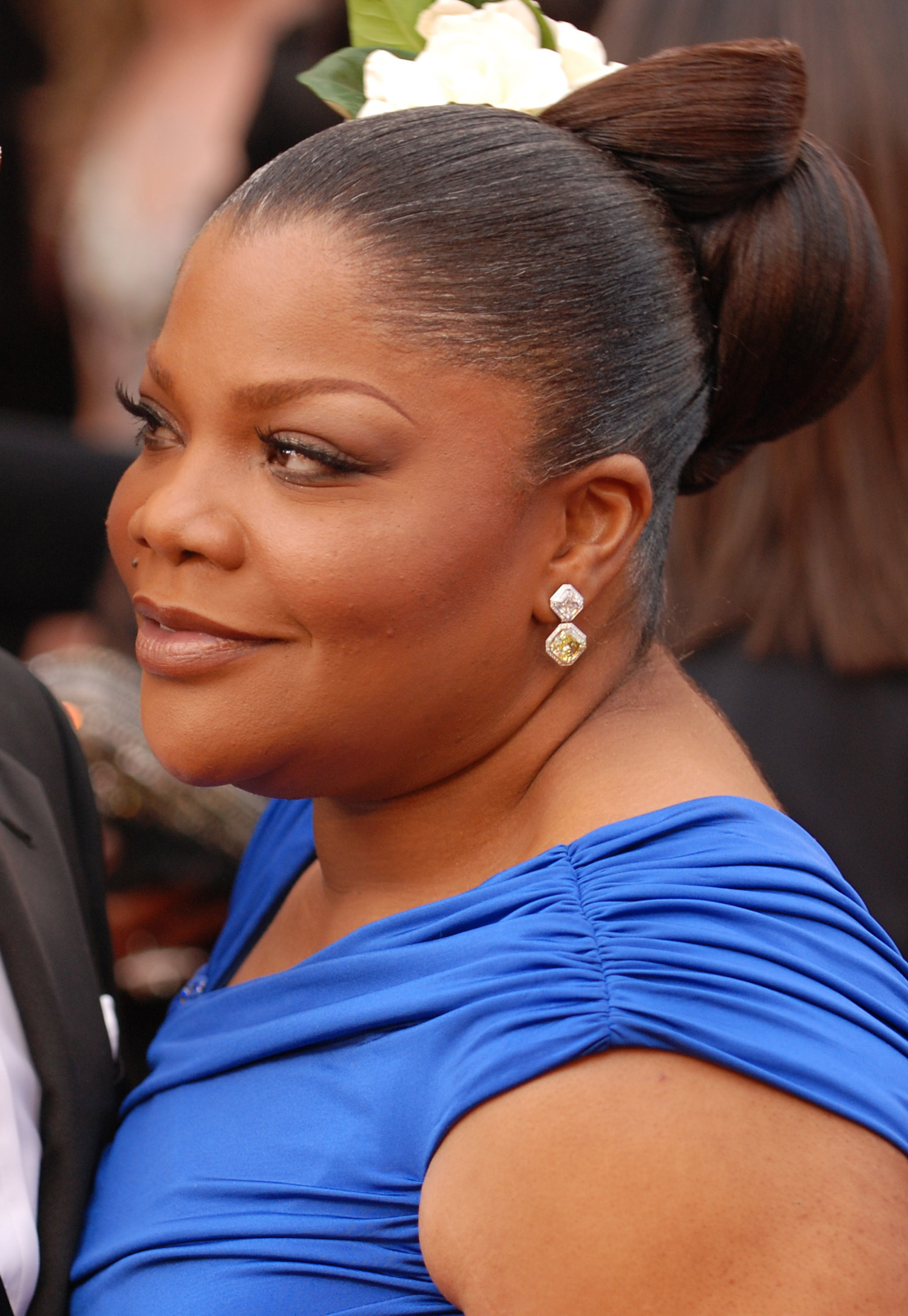
Mo'Nique, Best Supporting Actress winner

=== Category awards ===
Best Picture	Best Director
1. **Up in the Air**; 2. The Hurt Locker; 3. Precious; 4. Up; 5. An Education; 6. A Serious Man; 7. Inglourious Basterds; 8. District 9; 9. Avatar; 10. Fantastic Mr. Fox	1. **Jason Reitman** - **Up in the Air**; 2. Kathryn Bigelow - The Hurt Locker; 3. Lee Daniels - Precious; 4. Joel Coen and Ethan Coen - A Serious Man; 5. Quentin Tarantino - Inglourious Basterds
Best Actor	Best Actress
1. **George Clooney** - **Up in the Air** as **Ryan Bingham**; 2. Jeff Bridges - Crazy Heart as Otis "Bad" Blake; 3. Jeremy Renner - The Hurt Locker as SFC. William James; 4. Colin Firth - A Single Man as George Falconer; 5. Morgan Freeman - Invictus as Nelson Mandela	1. **Carey Mulligan** - **An Education** as **Jenny Miller**; 2. Meryl Streep - Julie and Julia as Julia Child; 3. Gabourey Sidibe - Precious as Precious; 4. Emily Blunt - The Young Victoria as Queen Victoria; 5. Sandra Bullock - The Blind Side as Leigh Anne Tuohy
Best Supporting Actor	Best Supporting Actress
1. **Christoph Waltz** - **Inglourious Basterds** as **Col. Hans Landa**; 2. Woody Harrelson - The Messenger as Cpt. Tony Stone; 3. Stanley Tucci - The Lovely Bones as George Harvey; 4. Alfred Molina - An Education as Jack Miller; 5. Christian McKay - Me and Orson Welles as Orson Welles	1. **Mo'Nique** - **Precious** as **Mary**; 2. Anna Kendrick - Up in the Air as Natalie Keener; 3. Vera Farmiga - Up in the Air as Alex Goran; 4. Marion Cotillard - Nine as Luisa Contini; 5. Maggie Gyllenhaal - Crazy Heart as Jean Craddock
Best Foreign Language Film	Best Documentary Film
1. **Sin Nombre** • **Mexico**; 2. Broken Embraces • Spain; 3. Summer Hours • France; 4. Der Baader Meinhof Komplex • Germany; 5. Red Cliff • China/Hong Kong	1. **The Cove**; 2. Anvil! The Story of Anvil; 3. Capitalism: A Love Story; 4. Michael Jackson's This Is It; 5. Burma VJ **(TIE)** The September Issue **(TIE)**
Best Animated Film	Best Cinematography
1. **Up**; 2. Fantastic Mr. Fox	1. **The Lovely Bones** - **Andrew Lesnie**; 2. The Hurt Locker - Barry Ackroyd
Best Screenplay	
1. **Jason Reitman and Sheldon Turner** - **Up in the Air**; 2. Joel Coen and Ethan Coen - A Serious Man	

=== Individual awards ===
==== Russell Smith Award ====
- Precious, for "best low-budget or cutting-edge independent film
