= Provenance (disambiguation) =

Provenance is the origin and/or history of an object.

Provenance may also refer to:

== Arts and entertainment ==
- Provenance (album), a 2015 album by Paul Grabowsky and Vince Jones
- Provenance (novel), a 2017 novel by Ann Leckie
- The Provenance, a Swedish goth metal band

=== Film and television ===
- Provenance (film), a 2016 British drama film
- "Provenance" (Numb3rs), a 2006 TV episode
- "Provenance" (Person of Interest), a 2014 TV episode
- "Provenance" (Supernatural), a 2006 TV episode
- "Provenance" (The X Files), a 2002 TV episode

== Other uses ==
- Provenance (geology), the reconstruction of the origin of sediments
- Provenance (restaurant), a French restaurant in Philadelphia, Pennsylvania
- Data provenance, a generalisation of data lineage
- Provenance (information technologies), describe how an artifact or set of artifacts was produced
