= San Francisco Film Critics Circle Awards 2009 =

Annual US film awards ceremony

8th SFFCC Awards

December 14, 2009

Best Picture:
The Hurt Locker

The 8th San Francisco Film Critics Circle Awards, honoring the best in film for 2009, were given on 14 December 2009.

== Winners ==
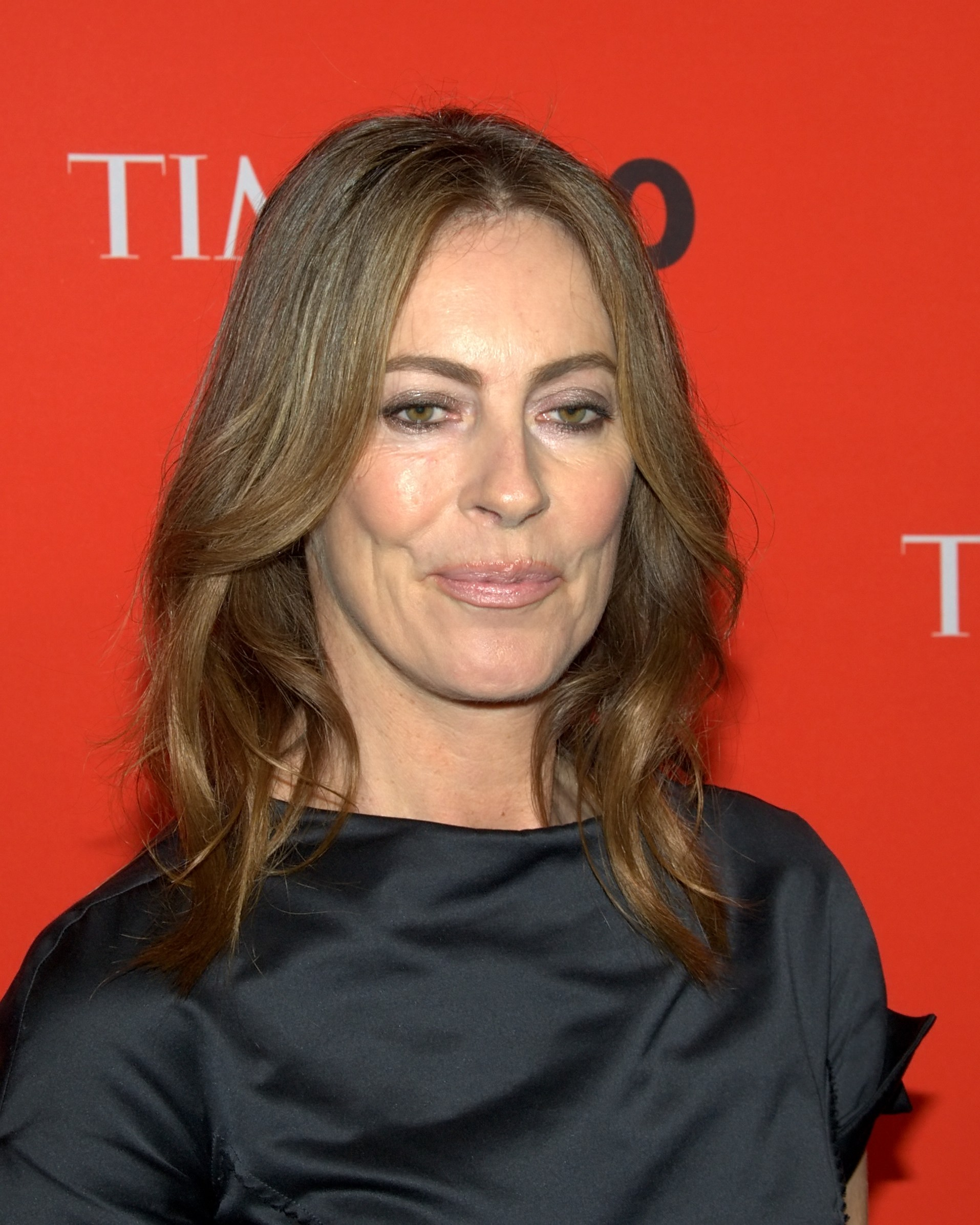
Kathryn Bigelow, Best Director winner

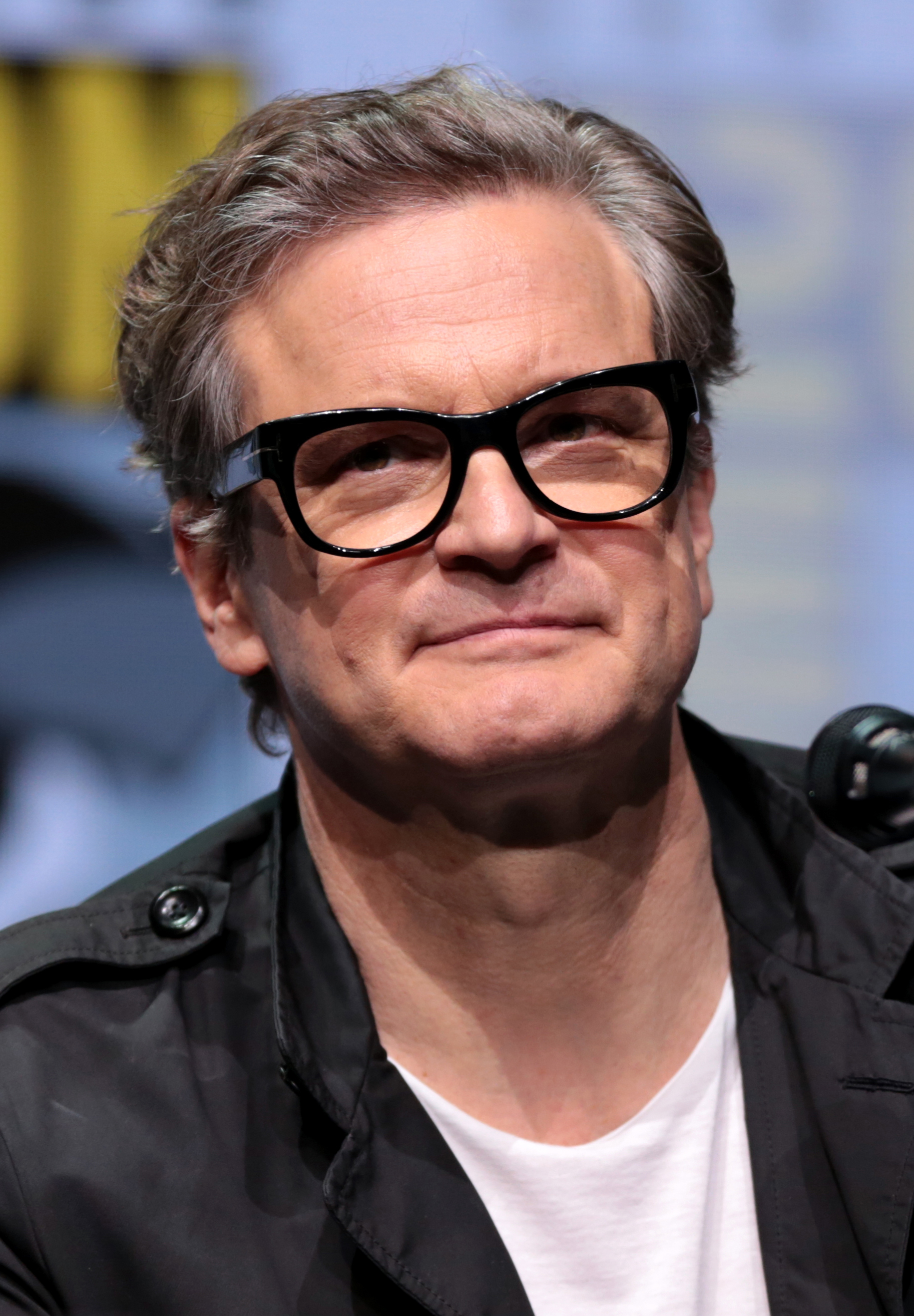
Colin Firth, Best Actor winner

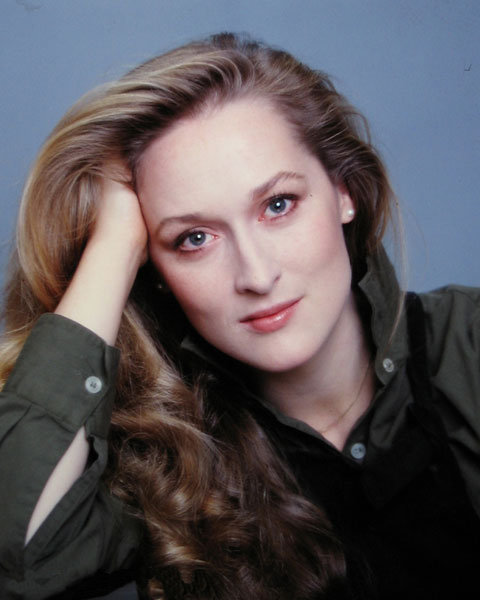
Meryl Streep, Best Actress winner

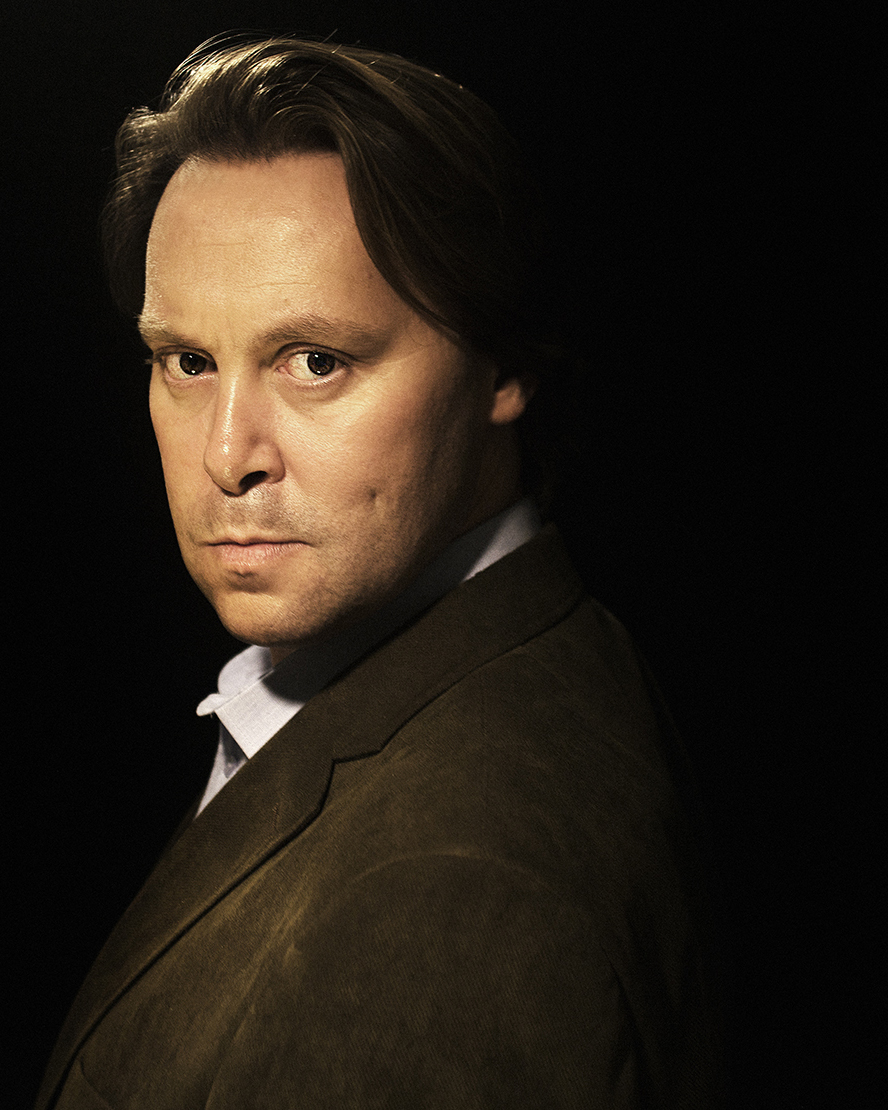
Christian McKay, Best Supporting Actor winner

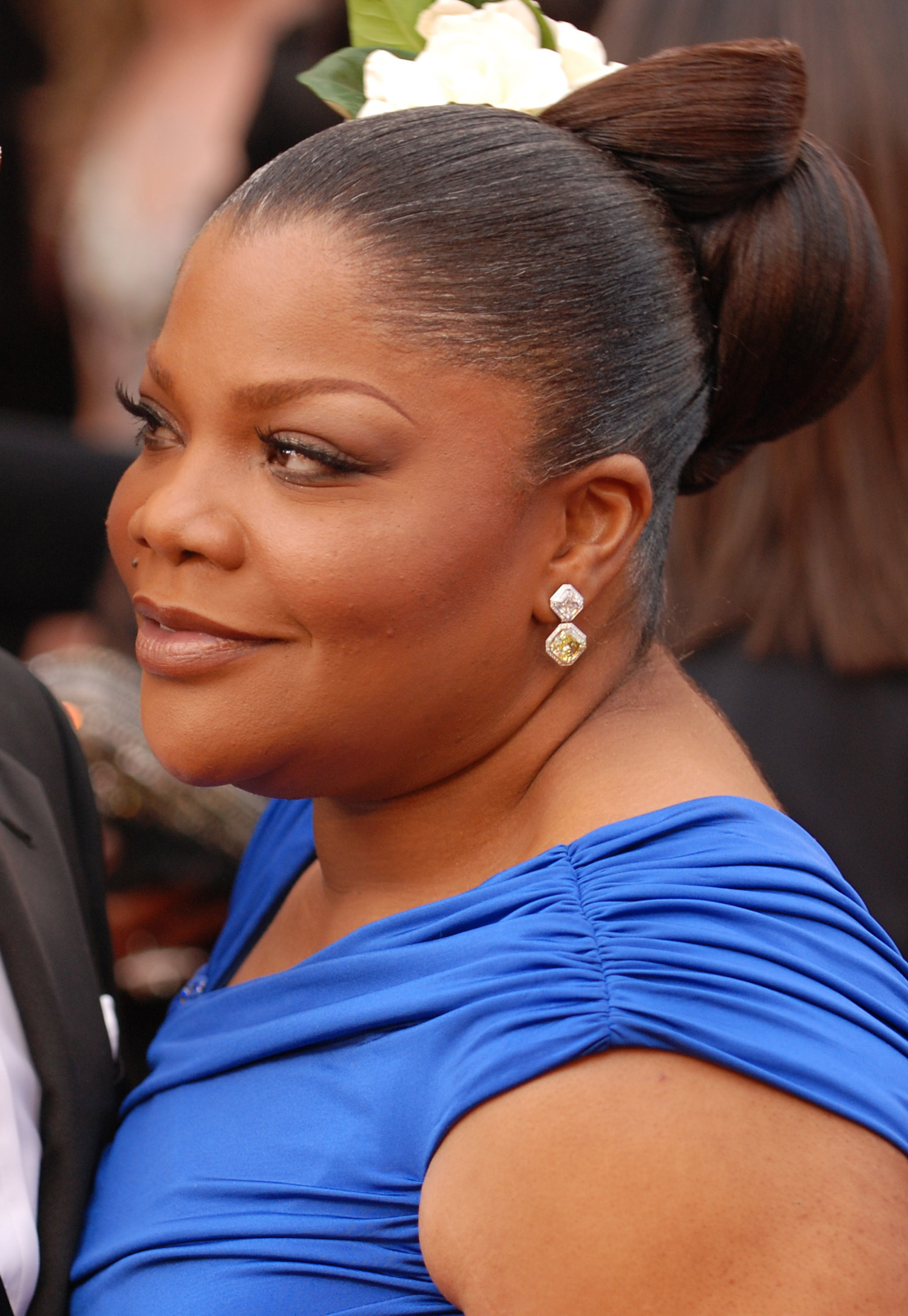
Mo'Nique, Best Supporting Actress winner

- Best Picture:
  - The Hurt Locker
- Best Director:
  - Kathryn Bigelow - The Hurt Locker
- Best Original Screenplay:
  - Inglourious Basterds - Quentin Tarantino
- Best Adapted Screenplay:
  - Fantastic Mr. Fox - Wes Anderson
- Best Actor:
  - Colin Firth - A Single Man
- Best Actress:
  - Meryl Streep - Julie & Julia
- Best Supporting Actor:
  - Christian McKay - Me and Orson Welles
- Best Supporting Actress:
  - Mo'Nique - Precious
- Best Animated Feature:
  - Coraline
- Best Foreign Language Film:
  - You, the Living (Du levande) • Sweden/Germany/France/Denmark/Norway/Japan
- Best Documentary:
  - Anvil! The Story of Anvil
- Best Cinematography:
  - A Serious Man - Roger Deakins
- Marlon Riggs Award (for courage & vision in the Bay Area film community):
  - Frazer Bradshaw - Everything Strange and New
  - Barry Jenkins - Medicine for Melancholy
- Special Citation:
  - Sita Sings the Blues
- In Memoriam:
  - Rose Kaufman
