= Dick Pope (cinematographer) =

British cinematographer (1947–2024)

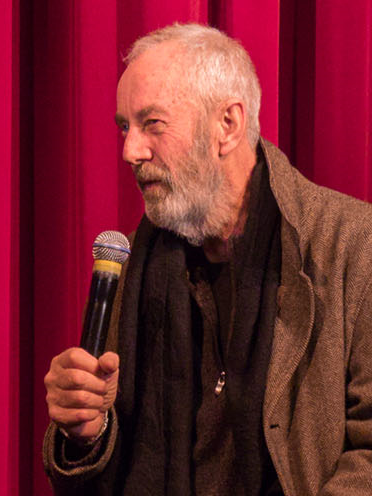
- Pope in 2015
- Born: Richard Campbell Pope; 3 August 1947; Bromley, Kent, England
- Died: 21 October 2024 (aged 77); London, England
- Years active: 1968–2024
- Organization: British Society of Cinematographers
- Spouse: Pat (m. 1972)
- Children: 2

Richard Campbell Pope (3 August 1947 – 21 October 2024) was a British cinematographer, known for his work with director Mike Leigh.

== Early life and career ==
Born in Bromley, Pope took interest in photography at an early age.

He trained at the Pathé lab in London and began his career working as a camera operator on documentaries. In the 1970s and 1980s he shot numerous music videos for artists like Queen, Tina Turner, The Clash, The Specials and The Police.

Pope then began working as a cinematographer on feature films in the 1980s before starting his collaboration with Mike Leigh on Life is Sweet (1990).

He was nominated for two Academy Awards and two BAFTAs for Best Cinematography.

== Personal life and death ==
Pope and his wife, Pat, whom he married in 1972, had two children.

He died in London on 21 October 2024 at the age of 77.

== Filmography ==
=== Film ===
Short film

Year	Title	Director
1983	Six Days in Romandie	Lindsey Clennell
2005	Friday Night Shirt	Joanna Carrick
2007	Walking Away	Joanna Carrick
2008	Intercom	Mark Gutteridge
2012	A Running Jump	Mike Leigh
2015	The Pros	Cecilia Torquato

Feature film

Year	Title	Director
1985	The Girl in the Picture	Cary Parker
1986	Coming Up Roses	Stephen Bayly
1990	The Reflecting Skin	Philip Ridley
1990	Dark City	Chris Curling
1990	Life Is Sweet	Mike Leigh
1993	Naked	Mike Leigh
1994	The Air Up There	Paul Michael Glaser
1995	Nothing Personal	Thaddeus O'Sullivan
1995	An Awfully Big Adventure	Mike Newell
1996	Secrets & Lies	Mike Leigh
1997	Career Girls	Mike Leigh
1997	Swept from the Sea	Beeban Kidron
1999	Topsy-Turvy	Mike Leigh
1999	The Debt Collector	Anthony Neilson
2000	The Way of the Gun	Christopher McQuarrie
2001	Thirteen Conversations About One Thing	Jill Sprecher
2002	All or Nothing	Mike Leigh
2002	Nicholas Nickleby	Douglas McGrath
2004	Vera Drake	Mike Leigh
2006	Man of the Year	Barry Levinson
2006	The Illusionist	Neil Burger
2007	Honeydripper	John Sayles
2008	Angus, Thongs and Perfect Snogging	Gurinder Chadha
2008	Me and Orson Welles	Richard Linklater
2008	Happy-Go-Lucky	Mike Leigh
2010	Another Year	Mike Leigh
2010	It's a Wonderful Afterlife	Gurinder Chadha
2011	Thin Ice	Jill Sprecher
2011	Bernie	Richard Linklater
2014	Mr. Turner	Mike Leigh
2014	Cuban Fury	James Griffiths
2015	Legend	Brian Helgeland
2018	Peterloo	Mike Leigh
2019	The Boy Who Harnessed the Wind	Chiwetel Ejiofor
2019	Motherless Brooklyn	Edward Norton
2020	Supernova	Harry Macqueen
2022	The Outfit	Graham Moore
2024	Hard Truths	Mike Leigh

=== Television ===
TV series

Year	Title	Director	Notes
1982	Whoops Apocalypse	John Reardon	3 episodes
1985	The South Bank Show	Nigel Wattis	Episode "David Lean: A Life in Film"
1989	Forever Green	David Giles	6 episodes
1995	Lloyds Bank Channel 4 Film Challenge	Coky Giedroyc	Episode "Life's a Bitch"
1996	Screen Two	John Mackenzie	Segment Deadly Voyage

Miniseries

Year	Title	Director
1987	Porterhouse Blue	Robert Knights
1992	The Blackheath Poisonings	Stuart Orme

== Awards and nominations ==
Academy Awards

Year	Title	Category	Result
2006	The Illusionist	Best Cinematography	Nominated
2014	Mr. Turner	Best Cinematography	Nominated

American Society of Cinematographers

Year	Title	Category	Result
2006	The Illusionist	Outstanding Achievement in Cinematography	Nominated
2014	Mr. Turner	Outstanding Achievement in Cinematography	Nominated

Satellite Awards

Year	Title	Category	Result
2014	Mr. Turner	Best Cinematography	Won
2019	Motherless Brooklyn	Best Cinematography	Nominated

Other awards

Year	Title	Awards/Nominations
2006	The Illusionist	New York Film Critics Online Award for Best Cinematography; San Diego Film Critics Society Award for Best Cinematography
2014	Mr. Turner	British Society of Cinematographers Award for Best Cinematography; International Cinephile Society Award for Best Cinematography; National Society of Film Critics Award for Best Cinematography; Vulcan Award; Nominated - BAFTA Award for Best Cinematography; Nominated - Critics' Choice Movie Award for Best Cinematography; Nominated - Los Angeles Film Critics Award for Best Cinematography; Nominated - Online Film Critics Society Award for Best Cinematography; Nominated - San Francisco Bay Area Film Award for Best Cinematography; Nominated - Seattle Film Critics Society Award for Best Cinematography
2015	—N/a	Royal Photographic Society Lumière Award for major achievement in British cinematography, video or animation
