= Harry Macqueen =

English actor, writer and director

- Born: Leicester, Leicestershire, England
- Education: The Royal Central School of Speech and Drama
- Occupations: Actor; Writer; Director

Harry Macqueen is an English actor, writer and film director from Cornwall, England. He studied acting at The Royal Central School of Speech and Drama in London.

== Career ==
His professional acting debut was in Richard Linklater's 2008 film, Me and Orson Welles playing 1930's Broadway star John Willard. Other credits include Jed Quinn in EastEnders, for BBC and Peter in the feature film Provenance, for which he won Best Supporting Actor at the 2017 Madrid Film Festival.

Hinterland was his debut feature film as a writer and director. It was nominated Best British Feature at Raindance Film Festival 2014 and Best Debut Film at the Beijing International Film Festival 2015. Hinterland was the UK's first fully carbon-neutral feature film.

His second feature as writer and director titled Supernova, starred Colin Firth and Stanley Tucci. It had its world premiere at San Sebastian Film Festival in 2020 and at London Film Festival the same year. The film was released by Studio Canal in the UK and Bleecker Street in the USA, garnering rave reviews on its release. The film scores 91% on Rotten Tomatoes. Supernova was long-listed for two BAFTA Awards including Outstanding British Film in 2021, and short-listed for Best Feature Film at the European Film Awards in the same year. In 2022, Supernova appeared on the 'Best British Films of the 21st Century' list - a poll by UK film critics.

In August 2026 it was announced that Supernova would be adapted for the stage, this time starring Ewan McGregor and Alan Cumming. The play is due to run at Pitlochry Festival Theatre, Scotland, in 2027 and will be directed by Tony and Olivier Award winning John Tiffany.

== Filmography ==
=== As actor ===
Year	Title	Role	Notes
2008	Me and Orson Welles	John Willard	
2010	The Dark Room	Dan	Short film
2011	Sit in Silence	Man	Short film
2012	EastEnders	Jed Quinn	Episodes from July 2012 onwards
2013	Blackbird	Stanley	Short film
2014	Hinterland	Harvey	also director, writer and producer
2014	A Tale of Two Thieves	Gordon Goody	Documentary
2017	Loose Ends	Danny	Short film
2017	Provenance	Peter	Won Best Supporting Actor Madrid Film Festival
2018	Lambeth Lights	Him	Short film
2024	The Cost of Hugging	Felix	Short film

=== As filmmaker ===
Year	Title	Director	Writer	Producer	Notes
2014	Hinterland	Yes	Yes	Yes	
2020	Supernova	Yes	Yes	No	
