= Hinterland (2015 film) =

- Directed by: Harry Macqueen
- Written by: Harry Macqueen
- Produced by: Harry Macqueen
- Starring: Harry Macqueen; Lori Campbell
- Cinematography: Ben Hecking
- Music by: Graham Hadfield
- Production company: Inheritance Films
- Distributed by: Soda Pictures
- Release date: 27 September 2014 (Raindance Film Festival)
- Running time: 78 minutes
- Country: United Kingdom
- Language: English
- Budget: £10,000

Hinterland is a feature film written, directed, produced and starring Harry Macqueen. The film was released in UK on 27 February 2015. It was nominated Best UK Feature at Raindance Film Festival 2014 and Best Debut at the Beijing International Film Festival 2015. It was released by Soda Pictures. It was the UK's first carbon-neutral feature film. The film was picked up by the streaming service MUBI in October 2015.

== Plot ==
When Harvey's (Harry Macqueen) childhood friend Lola (Lori Campbell) returns home after being abroad for many years, he takes her on a road-trip to the sea-side cottage where they spent much of their youth, rekindling their friendship along the way.

== Reception ==
The Telegraph called it 'A transporting debut'., "delicate and affecting" by The Guardian and "a powerful and courageous masterpiece" by ALT Magazine. Sight & Sound described the film as "so evocative...filmgoers who like their love stories wistful would be well advised to seek it out". Mike McCahill wrote in Movie Mail that "the film's sincerity and elegance of expression are unquestionable. This work of quiet assurance deserves entry to that select group of 21st century films Jamie Thraves' The Low Down, Alex Barrett's Life Just Is, perhaps Col Spector's Honeymooner, too that come close to nailing the way modern British twentysomethings talk, think, feel and muddle through".
