= Supernova (2020 film) =

2020 British drama film

- Official poster
- Directed by: Harry Macqueen
- Written by: Harry Macqueen
- Produced by: Tristan Goligher; Emily Morgan
- Starring: Colin Firth; Stanley Tucci
- Cinematography: Dick Pope
- Edited by: Chris Wyatt
- Music by: Keaton Henson
- Production companies: The Bureau; Quiddity Films; BBC Films; BFI
- Distributed by: StudioCanal
- Release dates: 22 September 2020 (Zinemaldia); 25 June 2021 (United Kingdom)
- Running time: 93 minutes
- Country: United Kingdom
- Language: English
- Box office: $3.4 million

Supernova is a 2020 British romantic drama film written and directed by Harry Macqueen. The film stars Colin Firth and Stanley Tucci.

Supernova had its world premiere at the 68th San Sebastián International Film Festival on 22 September 2020 and was released in the United States on 29 January 2021, by Bleecker Street, and in the United Kingdom on 25 June 2021, by StudioCanal. A play based on the film, is expected to premiere at Pitlochry Festival Theatre in 2027.

== Plot ==
Sam and Tusker, romantic partners for 20 years and amateur astronomers, undertake a road trip in a campervan across England to the Lake District, to visit some of their favourite spots and for a reunion with friends and family.

Tusker has been diagnosed with early onset dementia, with his progressing illness putting a strain on their relationship. He is in the middle of writing a book, but is struggling with it, refusing to show it to Sam. Sam is a pianist/composer preparing for what he says will be his final piano concert.

On the way they have a scare when, as Sam is buying a few things for them to eat in a shop, Tusker takes their dog for a walk without his mobile. He gets disoriented, but luckily Sam manages to find them. Shaken up by the experience, Sam tries to hide from Tusker how much it affected him.

As they go, they continually banter and gently bicker. The couple spend their second night on the edge of a lake they had visited together 20 years before, in the early days of their relationship.

The pair arrive at Sam’s sister Lily’s house, where they are put up in his old room. She again suggests Sam at least look into a carer to help take some of the burden off, but he insists it's not yet necessary. Later, on a walk through the woods, Sam tries to talk with Tusker about near-future adjustments they'll need to make on their home and his intention to stop performing, but he refuses to hear about it.

The rest of their family and friends later gather for a party in their honour, a surprise to Sam. During subsequent conversation with one of their friends, Sam finds out Tusker has been having difficulties writing, something he's kept from him.

Sam heads into their camper van and discovers in his journal that Tusker’s writing has been declining steadily over time. He also discovers that Tusker has a vial of pentobarbital and has made a farewell audio tape, explaining that he intends to take his own life. Sam says nothing.

The pair head to a leased cottage in the countryside. Sam confronts Tusker about his discovery and plays the tape to him, revealing Tusker’s plans to die by suicide before his dementia becomes too severe.

Sam strongly and pleadingly argues with him against this idea, to no avail. They make up the next day and have an intimate night together. The next morning, as Sam plays the piano, he lets Tusker know that he accepts his decision and wants to be at his side when it happens.

In the final scene, Sam appears on stage, playing the beautiful piano piece that Tusker loved so much.

== Cast ==
- Colin Firth as Sam
- Stanley Tucci as Tusker Mulliner
- Pippa Haywood as Lilly
- Peter MacQueen as Clive
- James Dreyfus as Tim
- Ian Drysdale as Paul
- Sarah Woodward as Sue
- Nina Marlin as Charlotte
- Daneka Etchells as Rachel

== Production ==
In October 2019, it was announced Colin Firth and Stanley Tucci had joined the cast of the film, with Harry Macqueen directing from a screenplay he wrote, with StudioCanal distributing in the United Kingdom. The film was shot by Dick Pope. The film's soundtrack was written and recorded by Keaton Henson.

== Release ==
The film had its world premiere at the 68th San Sebastián International Film Festival on 22 September 2020 in competition for the Golden Shell, and was released in the United Kingdom on 25 June 2021, by StudioCanal. In October 2020, Bleecker Street acquired U.S. distribution rights to the film and released it in the United States on 29 January 2021. It was selected in official competition at London Film Festival, San Sebastian Film Festival and Rome Film festival in 2020.

== Reception ==
Review aggregator website Rotten Tomatoes reports that 90% of 205 critic reviews are positive for the film. Critics consensus on the website reads, "Led by moving performances from Colin Firth and Stanley Tucci, Supernova is a heartbreaking look at the emotional toll that comes with accepting mortality." Metacritic calculated a weighted average score of 73 out of 100, based on 31 reviews, citing "generally favorable reviews".

It was a 'Critic's Pick' in The New York Times with Glenn Kenny calling the film "spectacularly moving". The Washington Post gave it four stars out of four. Justin Chang from Los Angeles Times said the film "shouldn't be missed".

The film was short-listed for two BAFTA Awards in the UK in 2021 including Best British Feature.

It was selected in the Best Feature category at the European Film Awards in 2021.

In 2022, Supernova was voted as one of the 'Best British Films of the 21st Century' in a poll by critics.

In an interview in 2025 Stanley Tucci called the film a "career highlight", saying: "It’s an absolutely beautiful film. I love that director [Harry Macqueen] and it got wonderful reviews and everything, though there were no awards or anything like that. That made me sad for the director/writer because I think he’s extraordinary. Getting an independent film about that subject off the ground like that is hard, and I wanted him to have more. I wanted him to have more success afterward."

== Other media ==
In August 2026, it was announced that Supernova would be adapted for the stage, this time starring Ewan McGregor and Alan Cumming. The play is due to run at Pitlochry Festival Theatre, in 2027 and will be directed by Tony and Olivier Award winning John Tiffany.
