= Supernova (play) =

2027 play by Harry Macqueen

- Original language: English
- Written by: Harry Macqueen
- Based on: 2020 film Supernova by Harry Macqueen

Premiere
- Date: 30 July 2027
- Place: Pitlochry Festival Theatre, Scotland
- Directed by: John Tiffany

Supernova is an upcoming play adapted by Harry Macqueen, based on his own screenplay for the 2020 film of the same name. Directed by John Tiffany, the world premiere production of Supernova is scheduled to open at Pitlochry Festival Theatre in July 2027.

== Background ==
The play is based on the 2020 film Supernova. The film starred Colin Firth and Stanley Tucci, and was based on an original screenplay by Harry Macqueen.

== Production ==
On 29 July 2026, it was announced that Supernova is scheduled to receive its world premiere at Pitlochry Festival Theatre, on 30 July 2027, following previews from 24 July. Initial casting was also announced with Pitlochry's artistic director Alan Cumming and Ewan McGregor, set to play lead roles.

Following its run in Pitlochry the play will transfer to the King's Theatre in Edinburgh. Part of the eightieth Edinburgh International Festival, it will run 26 to 29 August 2027.

The play is directed by John Tiffany, with movement direction by Steven Hoggett and design by Jamie Harrison.
