= Provenance (film) =

- Directed by: Ben Hecking
- Written by: Ben Hecking
- Produced by: Amanda Atkins
- Starring: Charlotte Vega; Christian McKay; Harry Macqueen
- Cinematography: Ben Hecking
- Edited by: Andonis Trattos
- Music by: Paul Handley
- Production company: White Horse Films
- Distributed by: Parkland Entertainment
- Release dates: 17 June 2017 (East End Film Festival); 19 June 2018 (United Kingdom)
- Running time: 93 minutes
- Country: United Kingdom
- Languages: English; French

Provenance is a 2017 British drama film written and directed by Ben Hecking. The movie stars Charlotte Vega, Christian McKay and Harry Macqueen.

Provenance had its world premiere at the East End Film Festival on 17 June 2017, scoring 10/10 for its first rating after the festival.

== Synopsis ==
John Finch has fled to his holiday home in the south of France to start a new way of life. Whilst waiting for his younger lover Sophia to join him, a seemingly chance encounter with a man called Peter will threaten to destroy everything.

== Cast ==
- Charlotte Vega as Sophia
- Christian McKay as John Finch
- Harry Macqueen as Peter
- Chereene Allen as Lara
- Luke Beattie as Agent
- Ludivine Parra as Marie

== Reception ==
=== Accolades ===
Provenance won Best Film and Best Supporting Actor (Harry Macqueen) at the Madrid International Film Festival on 15 July 2017. Charlotte Vega was nominated Best Actress at the same festival.
