= Summer Hours =

- Theatrical release poster
- Directed by: Olivier Assayas
- Written by: Olivier Assayas
- Produced by: Charles Gillibert; Marin Karmitz; Nathanaël Karmitz
- Starring: Juliette Binoche; Charles Berling; Jérémie Renier
- Cinematography: Eric Gautier
- Edited by: Luc Barnier
- Distributed by: MK2 Films
- Release date: 5 March 2008
- Running time: 103 minutes
- Country: France
- Language: French
- Budget: $3.8 million
- Box office: $7.8 million

Summer Hours (French: L'Heure d'été) is a 2008 French drama film written and directed by Olivier Assayas. It is the second in a series of films produced by the Musée d'Orsay, after Flight of the Red Balloon. In the film, two brothers and a sister witness the transfer of their childhood memories when they must relinquish a family summer house and collection after the death of their mother. The film was a critical success in the United States.

== Plot ==
On a summer day in the country, at the home of the widowed Hélène Berthier, who has dropped her married name of Marly, her three children, their spouses, and all her grandchildren assemble for her 75th birthday. Her preoccupation is over what will happen to the house and the valuable contents accumulated by her uncle Paul Berthier, who was a noted artist and to whom she was devoted. She hopes the children will decide amicably among themselves.

Shortly after her birthday she dies. The three heirs disagree about how to proceed. While Frédéric, the eldest, lives in Paris and wants to keep the house and contents as a place where the family can continue to gather. His two siblings both live overseas and want to keep just a few mementoes and convert the rest to cash. Adrienne lives in New York City with an American man, while Jérémie and his wife have made their home in China.

As Hélène made no legal provision, tax on the estate will be heavy. Their lawyer suggests reducing the bill by donating artefacts to the State. The Musée d'Orsay agrees to take some precious items for its collection. After that, the remaining contents are auctioned and the house sold. The faithful housekeeper takes fresh flowers to Hélène's grave. Before the new owners take over, Frédéric's daughter Sylvie asks all her school friends there for a final party. For one last time the place is full of happy young people.

== Cast ==
- Charles Berling as Frédéric Marly
- Juliette Binoche as Adrienne Marly, Frédéric's younger sister
- Jérémie Renier as Jérémie Marly, Frédéric younger brother
- Édith Scob as Hélène Berthier
- Dominique Reymond as Lisa Marly, wife of Frédéric
- Valérie Bonneton as Angela Marly, wife of Jérémie
- Isabelle Sadoyan as Éloïse, Hélène's faithful housekeeper
- Alice de Lencquesaing as Sylvie Marly, Frédéric's elder child

== Production ==
Principal photography began in Paris on 4 June 2007 and was completed on 27 July 2007. The film was known under the working titles Souvenirs du Valois and Printemps Passé.

== Release ==
The film received its United States premiere on October 1, 2008, at the 46th New York Film Festival. The Criterion Collection released a special edition of the film on April 20, 2010.

== Reception ==
Summer Hours was a critical triumph. It received 93% positive reviews on Rotten Tomatoes, and was one of the most highly decorated foreign-language films in the United States in 2009. The film won and was nominated for numerous critics' awards:

- Boston Society of Film Critics Award for Best Foreign Language Film
- New York Film Critics Circle Award for Best Foreign Language Film
- Los Angeles Film Critics Association Award for Best Foreign Language Film
- National Society of Film Critics Award for Best Foreign Language Film
- Southeastern Film Critics Association Award for Best Foreign Language Film
- Vancouver Film Critics Circle Awards
- Chicago Film Critics Association Awards (nominated)
- Washington D.C. Area Film Critics Association Award for Best Foreign Language film (nominated)
- Houston Film Critics Society Awards (nominated)
- Online Film Critics Society Awards (nominated)
- Denver Film Critics Society (nominated)
- Dallas-Fort Worth Film Critics Association Awards (nominated)

Édith Scob was nominated for a César Award for her portrayal of Hélène.

In 2017 the film was named the ninth "Best Film of the 21st Century So Far" by The New York Times.
