= Christian McKay =

English stage & screen actor (born 1973)

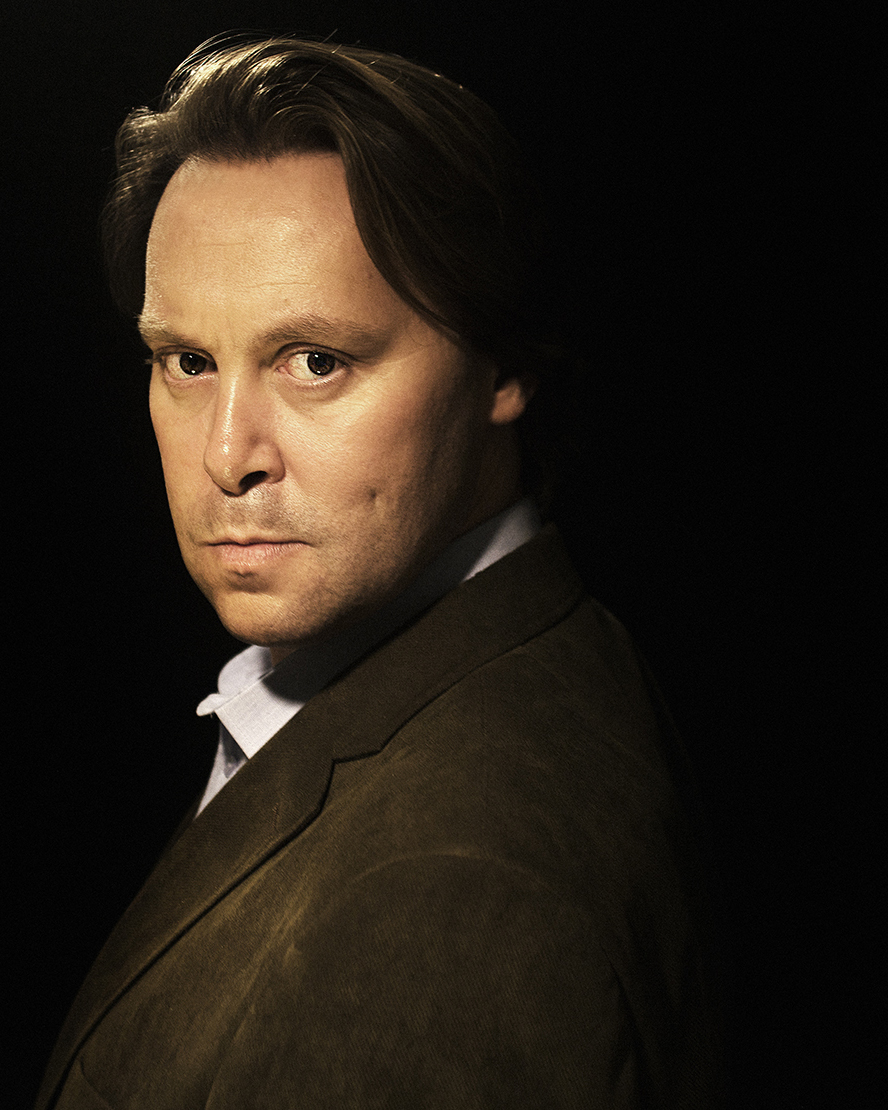
- Christian McKay in 2013
- Born: Christian Stuart McKay; 30 December 1973 (age 52); Bury, Lancashire, England, UK
- Occupation: Actor
- Years active: 2001–present
- Spouse: Emily Allen (m. 2006)
- Children: 2

Christian Stuart McKay (born 30 December 1973) is an English stage and screen actor. He is best known for his portrayal of Orson Welles in the 2008 film Me and Orson Welles, for which he was nominated for over two dozen awards including the BAFTA Award for Best Supporting Actor. He also appeared in Florence Foster Jenkins, The Theory of Everything, Tinker Tailor Soldier Spy and Rush.

== Early life ==
McKay was born in Bury, Lancashire. He has a sister, Karen. His mother, Lynn, worked as a hairdresser, and his father, Stuart, was a railway worker. He studied piano as a youth, and performed the Rachmaninoff Piano Concerto No. 3 at age 21. McKay subsequently halted his concert career and enrolled at the Royal Academy of Dramatic Art to study acting.

== Career ==
McKay's television appearances include portraying conductor Pierre Monteux in the BBC TV production Riot at the Rite (2005). His first film appearance was in Abraham's Point (2008).

After seeing a performance of Rosebud at the 2007 "Brits Off Broadway" festival, Richard Linklater cast McKay as Welles in his film Me and Orson Welles, retaining McKay over the subsequent producer objections to his casting. In this, his second film and first lead role, McKay received critical praise for his performance as Orson Welles.

McKay has recently been seen in the biographical drama Rush, alongside Chris Hemsworth and Daniel Brühl, the BAFTA-nominated music film Northern Soul, and the Oscar-winning biographical drama The Theory of Everything, alongside Eddie Redmayne and Felicity Jones. All of these were met with critical acclaim, with The Theory of Everything receiving a nomination for the Academy Award for Best Picture.

=== Theatre ===
McKay has portrayed Orson Welles in the one-man play Rosebud: The Lives of Orson Welles at a number of venues, including the Edinburgh Festival and King's Head (London). He subsequently reprised the role in the US at the 2007 "Brits Off Broadway" festival.

In 2013, McKay played Gerard in Strangers on a Train at London's Gielgud Theatre.

== Personal life ==
McKay was married to Emily Allen. They divorced in 2021. He has two children, Maximilian Sidney McKay, born 2011 and Aniela Rita Lynn McKay, born 2015.

== Selected filmography ==
=== Film ===
Year	Title	Role	Notes
2008	Abraham's Point	Robert	
2009	Me and Orson Welles	Orson Welles	Austin Film Critics Association Award for Breakthrough Artist; San Francisco Film Critics Circle Award for Best Supporting Actor; Utah Film Critics Association Award for Best Supporting Actor; Nominated — BAFTA Award for Best Supporting Actor; Nominated — British Independent Film Award for Most Promising Newcomer; Nominated — Broadcast Film Critics Association Award for Best Supporting Actor; Nominated — Chicago Film Critics Association Award for Best Supporting Actor; Nominated — Chicago Film Critics Association Award for Most Promising Performer; Nominated — Dallas–Fort Worth Film Critics Association Award for Best Supporting Actor; Nominated — Denver Film Critics Society Award for Best Supporting Actor; Nominated — Detroit Film Critics Society Award for Best Supporting Actor; Nominated — Evening Standard British Film Award for Best Actor; Nominated — Houston Film Critics Society Award for Best Supporting Actor; Nominated — Independent Spirit Award for Best Supporting Male; Nominated — International Cinephile Society Award for Best Supporting Actor; Nominated — London Film Critics Circle Award for British Actor of the Year; Nominated — National Society of Film Critics Award for Best Supporting Actor (3rd place); Nominated — New York Film Critics Circle Award for Best Supporting Actor (2nd place); Nominated — San Diego Film Critics Society Award for Best Actor; Nominated — Toronto Film Critics Association Award for Best Supporting Actor; Nominated — Washington D.C. Area Film Critics Association Award for Best Breakthrough Performance
2010	You Will Meet a Tall Dark Stranger	Poker Friend	
2010	Mr. Nice	Hamilton McMillan	
2011	I Melt With You	Tim	
2011	Tinker Tailor Soldier Spy	Mackelvore	
2013	Rush	Alexander Hesketh	
2013	The Devil's Violinist	John Watson	
2014	Closer to the Moon	Iorgu	
2014	Northern Soul	Dad	
2014	The Theory of Everything	Roger Penrose	
2015	Creditors	Grant Pierce	Nominated — Blow-Up International Arthouse Film Festival for Best Actor
2016	The Young Messiah	Cleopas	
2016	ChickLit	David Rose	
2016	Florence Foster Jenkins	Earl Wilson	
2017	The Leisure Seeker	Will Spencer	
2017	Crooked House	Roger Leonides	
2017	Provenance	John	
2018	The Talent Agent	Jeff Rogers	Short film
2019	The Second Hearing		Short film
2022	Mrs. Harris Goes to Paris	Giles Newcombe	

=== Television ===
Year	Title	Role	Notes
2004	Doctors	Neville Gordon	Episode: "Pardon"
2005	Riot at the Rite	Pierre Monteux	TV film
2008	Agatha Christie's Poirot	Jefferson Cope	Episode: "Appointment with Death"
2009	A Short Stay in Switzerland	Carsten	TV film
2009	Margaret	John Whittingdale	TV film
2010	The Road to Coronation Street	Harry Elton	TV film
2011–2013	Borgia	Cardinal Sforza	
2012	Getting On	Dr. Nigel Hoskins	Episode #3.3
2015	Jekyll and Hyde	Maxwell Utterson	
2016	Churchill's Secret	Christopher Soames	TV film
2016	Frontier	Father James Coffin	
2019	Grantchester	Anthony Hobbs	4 episodes
2019–2020	Warrior	Mayor Samuel Blake	
2023	FDR	President Franklin D. Roosevelt	
2024	Strike	Inigo Upcott	Episode 2
2024	Churchill at War	Winston Churchill	
