= Sheldon Turner =

American film producer

- Education: Cornell University
- Occupations: Screenwriter, producer
- Notable work: Up in the Air; X-Men: First Class

Sheldon Turner is a screenwriter and producer. His produced credits as a screenwriter include The Longest Yard (2005), The Texas Chainsaw Massacre: The Beginning (2006), Up in the Air (2009) and X-Men: First Class (2011). He is an alum of Cornell University.

Turner was featured in The Dialogue interview series. In this 90-minute interview with producer Michael De Luca, Turner charts his detour from law school to screenwriting. Turner will be writing the live action Splinter Cell film. His production company Vendetta Productions recently signed a first-look deal with A+E Studios.

== Filmography ==
Film writer

- The Longest Yard (2005)
- The Texas Chainsaw Massacre: The Beginning (2006)
- Up in the Air (2009)
- X-Men: First Class (2011) (Story only)

Television

Year	Title	Writer	Executive Producer	Notes
2015	The Advocate	Yes	Yes	TV movie
2017	Controversy	Yes	Yes	TV movie
2020	Acting for a Cause	Yes	Yes	Episode "Up in the Air"

== Awards ==
Up in the Air's script won:

- The BAFTA Awards for Best Adapted Screenplay
- The Golden Globe Awards for Best Screenplay
- The Writers Guild award for Best Adapted Screenplay
- The Broadcast Film Critics award for Best Adapted Screenplay
- The Chicago Film Critics award for Best Adapted Screenplay
- The Dallas-Fort Worth Film Critics for Best Screenplay
- The Denver Film Critics Society award for Best Adapted Screenplay
- The Florida Film Critics award for Best Screenplay
- The Houston Film Critics award for Best Screenplay
- The Indiana Film Critics award for Best Screenplay
- The Kansas City Film Critics award for Screenplay
- The Los Angeles Film Critics award for Screenplay
- The National Board of Review award for Best Adapted Screenplay
- The Oklahoma Film Critics award for Best Screenplay - Adapted
- The Southeastern Film Critics award for Best Adapted Screenplay
- The Toronto Film Critics award for Best Screenplay (tie)
- The Washington D.C. Area Film Critics award for Best Screenplay, Adapted
