= List of Star episodes =

Star is an American drama television series created by Lee Daniels and Tom Donaghy. The series follows three young women who navigate the music business on their road to success. The series debuted on December 14, 2016, on Fox and was renewed for a second season in February 2017. The second season debuted on September 27, 2017. On May 10, 2018, Fox renewed the show for a third season, which premiered on September 26, 2018.

During the course of the series, 48 episodes of Star aired over three seasons, between December 14, 2016, and May 8, 2019.

== Series overview ==
Season	Episodes	Originally released	
Season	Episodes	First released	Last released
1	12	December 14, 2016	March 15, 2017
2	18	September 27, 2017	May 23, 2018
3	18	September 26, 2018	May 8, 2019

== Episodes ==
=== Season 1 (2016–17) ===
No. overall	No. in season	Title	Directed by	Written by	Original release date	Prod. code	U.S. viewers (millions)
1	1	"Pilot"	Lee Daniels	Lee Daniels & Tom Donaghy	December 14, 2016	1AZD01	6.71
Star, an 18-year old orphan living in Pittsburgh, persuades her social worker to give her the location of her half-sister Simone so that the two can pursue their dreams of a music career in Atlanta. After discovering Simone being sexually abused by her foster father Otis, Star stabs him and the two flee in his car. Meanwhile, Star's Instagram friend Alexandra, eager to escape her controlling parents, lies to both Star and Simone about who they are when the girls come to collect her. In Atlanta, the three meet Carlotta, Star's godmother, who encourages them to abandon their dreams and join her church choir. Ignoring her advice, Star, with the help of Carlotta's daughter Cotton, goes to a local strip club, where she gets a washed-up producer, Jahil, to book her and the others for a show at a house party, after which he agrees to manage them. Carlotta visits Jahil (who also managed Carlotta and Star and Simone's mother during their careers), and warns him to stay away from Star.
2	2	"The Devil You Know"	Lee Daniels	Lee Daniels & Tom Donaghy	January 4, 2017	1AZD02	4.72
Alexandra's parents show up to bring her back home, straining her relationship with Star, who feels both betrayed and angered by her reluctance to exploit her connections to help their careers. Simone, struggling to forget her memories of abuse, becomes increasingly addicted to prescription medications. As Alexandra wrestles with whether or not to turn her back on the others, Star visits her father Roland and tries to get him to sleep with her despite being underage. However, she decides not to do so after nearly getting caught by Alexandra's snobbish mother, Rose. Unable to persuade his family to loan him more money, Jahil turns to an old friend, who agrees to let him take part in her smuggling operation. As Alexandra and Star patch things up by practicing for an upcoming music festival, Simone makes her debut in Carlotta's choir, only to collapse from drug-related complications after her performance.
3	3	"Next of Kin"	Paul McCrane	Jessica Sharzer	January 11, 2017	1AZD03	4.25
While Alexandra and Star set up a deal with producer Big Boi to record their first single, Carlotta and Cotton watch over Simone while she recovers in the hospital. After Star learns about her sister's condition, as well as the hospital's advice to have Simone treated as a suicide risk, she argues with them and Carlotta about what's best for her. Jahil discovers that the "deal" he's been assigned to work on is actually part of a human trafficking ring, and he ends up freeing the girls out of guilt. Star and Alexandra fake a robbery at Carlotta's salon to distract her, giving them time to break into the hospital, grab Simone, and bring her to Boi's studio for recording. When she figures out what's going on, however, an argument breaks out and Boi walks away from the deal. With only two hours left to record, the girls set up an improvised studio in the hospital showers with Jahil's help. Unbeknownst to them, Simone's foster father, who survived the attempt on his life, has managed to track her to Atlanta.
4	4	"Code of Silence"	Rose Troche	Kimberley Ann Harrison	January 18, 2017	1AZD04	3.96
Carlotta and Bruce get ready to participate in an annual hairstyling competition, at which the girls are scheduled to perform a showcase of classic Gladys Knight songs. Jahil helps one of the women he freed, Eva, obtain a fake ID so she can start a new life. When his apartment gets ransacked later that evening, he is forced to take her to the show for protection. After the girls perform their opening number, Star is confronted by Otis, and he threatens her. While the others search for them, Simone finds Otis and apparently kills him with Carlotta's gun. Carlotta has Jahil bury the body while she and Star find Simone and comfort her. After swearing the girls to silence, Carlotta sends them back to finish their performance. The salon ultimately wins the competition, and Jahil refuses Eva when she offers to have sex with him. Simone confesses that she didn't kill Otis, but it's unclear who was truly responsible.
5	5	"New Voices"	Tamra Davis	Denitria Harris-Lawrence & Thomas Westfall	January 25, 2017	1AZD05	3.79
At a photo shoot, Alexandra storms out after accusing the photographer of trying to "lighten her" in comparison to Star and Simone. While searching through Carlotta's garage, Simone finds an old VCR recording of her mother from 1992, which she shows to the others. Jahil takes Star and Alexandra to observe a rival group, Glamour, which they all acknowledge to be very good. Simone suggests covering one of Mary's songs for an upcoming contest, but both Star and Carlotta are opposed. During a rehearsal session, Jahil admits that he let Mary's career fall apart, but blames Carlotta for being jealous of her talent. In turn, Carlotta tells Alex that Jahil cheated on her with Mary. Hunter gives Star his credit card so that the girls can buy outfits for the contest, at which they perform Mary's song. While outside, Jahil is abducted by masked men. Hunter discovers that Star spent over $20,000 on his card, and they fight. Simone's foster mother contacts her for information about Otis, while an unconscious Jahil is taken to an old warehouse and abandoned.
6	6	"Infamous"	Michael Schultz	Charles Cuesta	February 1, 2017	1AZD06	4.05
Jahil is released from captivity when Arlene pays off his debts. In exchange, she demands that he get Star to quit the group and end her relationship with Hunter. For an upcoming performance at a children's hospital, Jahil has Alex replace Star as lead singer, making her resentful. Hunter comes to apologize for not hearing her out, and they reconcile. Simone invites Pastor Harris to have dinner at Carlotta's house against Cotton's wishes, as she fears his disapproval of her being a transgender woman. Alex attends a party with Derek and Star, where his alcoholic grandmother insults the latter. At the dinner, Cotton leaves when Harris invites her to church. Jahil asks Hunter to stay away from Star, which he mistakes for envy. Carlotta admits to Harris that Cotton is transgender, which is why she never invited him over before. After the girls, under the name Big Trouble, finish their performance, Arlene threatens Jahil and he formulates a plan to replace Star with Eva after he hears her singing in the shower. Alex and Simone, fed up with Star's ego, refuse to talk to her. While watching the news, the salon's staff are horrified to learn that Danielle was shot and killed by police during a traffic stop.
7	7	"Black Wherever I Go"	Kevin Tancharoen	Arabella Anderson & Jamila Daniel	February 8, 2017	1AZD07	4.12
After Danielle's funeral, Derek, Alexandra, and Simone plan a Black Lives Matter protest at the police station. Eva admits that she has been maneuvering Jahil into supporting her singing career, and he agrees to help her in exchange for oral sex. The girls discourage Star from performing at the protest with them, which she feels is because she's too "white". Arlene visits Jahil and demands that he fire Star, so he and Eva plot to remove her from their lives. Carlotta lets Alexandra leave for the protest, but refuses to let Simone join. Eva encourages Hunter to take Star on vacation, while Jahil meets with Arlene's incarcerated husband and gets incriminating information about her from him. Harris convinces Carlotta to take Simone to the rally. When Star realizes that she's late for practice, Hunter destroys her phone and the girls are forced to let Eva sing in her place. The rally turns violent after agitators attack the police, and Derek is arrested. Jahil blackmails Arlene by threatening to reveal that Hunter has been using steroids so that she'll relinquish her hold over him. Star finds a package containing a new phone with her name engraved on the case. A construction crew finds Otis's body, while Alex is arrested for driving without a license.
8	8	"Mama's Boy"	Millicent Shelton	Gladys Rodriguez	February 15, 2017	1AZD08	4.07
After spending a night in jail, Alex is bailed out by her mother, then ditches her to attend Derek's arraignment. The judge sets his bail at $250,000, so Star proposes holding a block party to raise funds. Jahil learns from one of his fellow producers that Big Trouble has exploded in popularity after the protest song, and he decides to add Eva to the group. Derek's lawyer advises him to take a plea deal, to Alex's disgust. Cotton comes out as transgender to her boyfriend, but when she returns home later that night, she and Carlotta get in a brief argument, and Carlotta slaps her in the face, which she immediately regrets. Carlotta then asks Cotton to use the money she's been saving for her surgery for Derek's bail; she refuses. Star asks Hunter to contribute, and they fight again, ending with him slapping her in the face. Out of guilt, he invites the legendary rapper Pumpkin to address the party, but despite her presence, the girls find that they are still short $10,000. Alex asks her mother to cover the rest, in exchange for her returning home. With Carlotta's approval, Harris forces Cotton to undergo conversion therapy, but when her daughter runs away in tears, she throws him out. Star talks Cotton out of committing suicide, while Alex goes back on her agreement with Rose in order to pursue a relationship with Derek. When Jahil informs the girls of his decision to bring in Eva, Star announces that she's quitting Big Trouble.
9	9	"Alibi"	J. Miller Tobin	Kimberly Ann Harrison	February 22, 2017	1AZD09	3.89
Star crashes at Hunter's house, but refuses to let him touch her. Jahil gives Eva an old song he wrote with Spanish lyrics. The girls come by to ask Star to return home, but she rudely turns them away. Cotton asks her boss Maggie for more work, but when the latter tries to harass her, Jahil bails her out and lets her stay with his girlfriend Michelle. Child Services and the police arrive at the salon and take Simone into state custody. They also inform Carlotta that she's a person of interest in Otis's murder. To protect her, Simone confesses to killing him instead. The police find Carlotta's gun in her bedroom, and she is arrested for murder. When Star and Alexandra come to get Simone, they learn that her confession has already been sent to the police. After it becomes clear that neither Carlotta or Simone was responsible for Otis's death, they are both released from custody and Carlotta is given temporary guardianship of the girls. Elliot discovers that Cotton is still working as a prostitute despite promising him she would quit, and he leaves her. Alex and Simone prepare a new song for Atlanta NextFest. A flashback shows Carlotta being arrested for committing a robbery, and her newborn son being cared for by Mary while she serves out her prison sentence. Star confronts Jahil about his priorities, and he agrees to cut Eva from Big Trouble.
10	10	"Boy Trouble"	John Krokidas	Denitria Harris-Lawrence	March 1, 2017	1AZD10	3.36
Jahil makes it clear that he has no desire for a relationship with Star. The girls learn that they will not be allowed to participate in Atlanta NextFest due to Jahil dropping Eva, and Star assaults him in anger. Carlotta is informed that Cotton is using drugs, including marijuana and Molly. Derek decides to hire a new attorney, who devises a plan to get his charges dropped. Star and Eva agree to work together again to get Big Trouble back into the festival. Jahil taps Pumpkin to produce a new song for the group. During recording, Eva incurs Star's jealousy by successfully incorporating Spanish lyrics into the melody. A fight breaks out during rehearsal, but Jahil is able to motivate the girls to cooperate. Following a well-received performance by Glamour, Big Trouble is named one of the five finalists in the competition. Later that evening, Simone overhears Jahil and Eva discussing how they tricked the girls into letting her join. Hunter takes Star to the new house he bought in her name. Simone shares what she knows with her sister, and the two plot their revenge. Alex and Derek get in a car accident after Derek reveals that he leaked the name of the officer who arrested Alex to the media. Jahil brings an intoxicated Cotton home, and she tries to kiss him. Enraged, Carlotta storms out and reveals that Cotton is Jahil's "son".
11	11	"Saving Face"	Paul McCrane	Jessica Sharzer	March 8, 2017	1AZD11	3.80
In the aftermath of Alex's accident, Star and Simone discuss whether or not Hunter's relationship with Star is genuine. Alex learns that, while completely unharmed, she is pregnant. Rose shows up and insists that her daughter get an abortion, but Alex insists that the decision is hers to make. Jahil successfully bonds with Cotton, but when she returns home, she discovers that Michelle has stolen all of her money and fled to California. Cotton returns home to pawn her jewelry, and Carlotta bungles her attempt to make amends. At a photo shoot to promote Big Trouble's upcoming tour, Hunter becomes uncomfortable with the thought that Star could be unfaithful to him. Big Boi informs the group that he's changed his mind and is willing to produce their first album, but only if they let him replace Jahil as manager. Star, Simone, and Alex are eager to accept the deal, but Eva is hesitant. Derek learns that the injuries he suffered from the crash have left him paralyzed from the waist down. Cotton asks Jahil for a forged ID, and Derek vows to stay by Alex's side. Hunter gets drunk and hits Star when she insults him. Rose agrees to support whatever decision Alex makes, and Jahil is arrested after the police determine that his car was used to transport Otis's body.
12	12	"Showtime"	Tamara Davis	Tom Donaghy & Charles Pratt Jr.	March 15, 2017	1AZD12	3.95
Hunter bails Jahil out of custody. Despite Carlotta's misgivings, Eva insists that Star set him up. Cotton visits Derek and Alex and informs them that she is undergoing her surgery. Jahil comforts a grieving Hunter, while Star hides her abuse from the others. With Jahil unable to manage, Big Boi takes control of Big Trouble. Star unwittingly reveals to Jahil that Eva betrayed him, and he slips back into cocaine addiction. He subsequently learns that Arlene has informed the traffickers he double-crossed of his betrayal. Star goes back to Hunter's mansion and threatens him with a tire iron. Carlotta learns that Otis's widow was the one who murdered him and records her confession for the police. As the girls get ready for the festival, Jahil and Carlotta reconcile. Simone confronts Hunter, frees a battered Star, and helps her break Hunter's wrist and hand. Big Boi explains that he has no intention of signing Big Trouble; he only wants Eva. Hunter goes to find Jahil, and ends up having sex with Eva. Big Trouble goes on to win the contest, and Carlotta agrees to step in as manager. Cotton is accompanied to the operating room by her parents, only to be arrested for grand theft. A hit on Jahil's life ends up killing Hunter and Eva instead, and he breaks down in tears upon finding their bodies.

=== Season 2 (2017–18) ===
No. overall	No. in season	Title	Directed by	Written by	Original release date	Prod. code	U.S. viewers (millions)
13	1	"The Winner Takes it All"	Lee Daniels	Karin Gist	September 27, 2017	2AZD01	5.40
Cotton is released from jail. Alex, trying to cope with her miscarriage, prepares to move in with Derek. On a fabricated tip from Arlene, Star is pulled in for questioning over Hunter's murder. The pressure is on for Big Trouble to complete their first album, giving Star the idea to pitch a song for troubled hitmaker Noah Brooks - it backfires, but Alex finds unintentional inspiration...although the label is transferred to the ruthless Ayanna Floyd. Carlotta calls in a favour with the Lyon family, relying on Jamal to set up a (ultimately unsuccessful) meeting with Ayanna.
14	2	"Insecure"	Chris Robinson	Kimberly Ann Harrison	October 4, 2017	2AZD02	4.56
Jahil, having faked his death, confronts Angel's father about money stolen from him. Carlotta and the girls meet with Ayanna, who heckles them into re-branding their image: Miss Bruce gives them a makeover, Star decides to do their own music video with an indie approach, and Alex brings in social media influencer Rachel Wallace in to drop their video...but Rachel will only do so for a kiss with Simone. The approach backfires: a livid Ayanna refuses to let the girls participate in her upcoming showcase. Miss Bruce convinces Carlotta to focus on the girls, leaving the salon in her hands. Dee Dee, Simone's tormentor in juvie, hangs herself after a confrontation in their therapy group, leaving feelings of torment in Simone. Star confronts Carlotta about changing the group's management: Carlotta chastises her for her selfishness before a beaten and bruised Jahil turns up at her door. Star begins recording in secret with Noah Brooks, while Carlotta browbeats Ayanna into letting the girls into the showcase.
15	3	"FUA...Good Night!"	Paul McCrane	Robert Munic	October 11, 2017	2AZD03	4.51
Alex struggles with caring for Derek, while battling her memories of the miscarriage (revealed to actually have been an abortion). Cotton starts work for Elliot to pay her debt off, but is confronted by a threat once she learns Omari is being released early. Star and the girls begin squabbling after Ayanna slots them at the bottom of her showcase trials (a mall food court): Jahil emerges and offers to be their producer again, eventually sneaking directly to Ayanna after Carlotta intervenes to protect the girls. Maurice Jeter, Ayanna's appointed A&R agent, helps Carlotta come to a compromise that will allow the girls to resume work. The song's underwhelming response at the food court drives Alex into a fury and she wrecks the set: Ayanna is furious until Carlotta persuades her to take advantage of the social media hype and include the girls beside Noah in the showcase - as backup singers. On the day of Noah's TV interview, Star takes over the performance, swaying the audience to her side and starting a new round of posturing between her and Noah that culminates in a kiss. Alex and Star eventually reconcile after Star witnesses her tending to Derek: eventually Maurice comes to Carlotta with producer approval. A man suddenly shows up at the salon asking to see Star.
16	4	"It Ain't Over"	John Krokidas	Tom Donaghy	October 18, 2017	2AZD04	4.22
Star, recognising the man as her estranged father, Brody, hostilely rebuffs his attempt to make amends for abandoning her ten years ago. As Alex and Derek motivate each other through their struggles (hers with songwriting and his with physiotherapy), Simone, back in juvie, tries to bond with her new cellmate, Karen, as Jahil tries to mend fences with Cotton. Ayanna hires Rachel Wallace as a consultant for Midtown: Star attacks her in a fit of rage when she dismisses the girls out of hand. Alex, testing out her new position as a producer, co-records with Noah. Derek is slapped back to reality by Miss Ruby and works up the courage to leave the house on his own for the first time since being in the wheelchair: a hate crime incident at a local mini-mart re-motivates Derek to resume his activism. While Brody tries to mend fences with Carlotta, Cotton opens up to a shaky, sobering Jahil about the imminent release of her cellmate Omari, as Ayanna prepares to sign hip-hop diva Gigi Nixon at a party to impress her famous father, Charles Floyd (who ultimately never shows). Banned from Ayanna's party after her dust-up with Rachel, Star sneaks the girls in and they perform to great acclaim, winning Gigi over and leaving Ayanna abashed: simultaneously, Maurice convinces a demoralised Carlotta to sing at a church service. While Alex and Derek mend fences with each other, Star and Noah have sex in a recording room after hours.
17	5	"May the Best Manager Win"	Bille Woodruff	Katie Wech	November 8, 2017	2AZD05	3.76
Alex and Derek break up in a fit of rage over each other's secrets. Star and Noah's relationship heats up: she insists on secret sex sessions while he wants more. Ayanna gets into a loaded confrontation with her famous father: she sets up an A&R showcase of her own to get back at him. Jahil attempts to pitch his music to Ayanna: her assistant, Andy, himself a talented singer, sneaks away to record with Jahil. Angel turns up, revealing that Jahil's music is in fact his: Jahil convinces Angel and Andy to become a duo. Alex is arrested for shoplifting: Carlotta helps her face her feelings. Brody keeps attempting to make amends with Star and Simone, to Star's repeat annoyance: when Karen is transferred to a more secure correctional centre, Simone kisses her goodbye. The girls give their first performance as Take 3: they are upstaged by Angel and Andy. Outside the club, Noah's best friend Lucas is stopped by a police officer and gets confrontational: Ayanna attempts to defuse the situation, but the officer shoots and kills Lucas, causing Noah to flip out in a rage. Star, softened after comforting Noah in the wake of the shooting, finally agrees to let Brody attempt to make amends, threatening his life if he endangers her or Simone again: he leaves, secretly reporting to a mysterious woman. Ayanna confesses to Jahil that her time as a business mogul has affected her ability to feel, expressing her admiration for his work with Angel and Andy: they begin making out, unaware that Carlotta is watching them.
18	6	"Faking It"	Tamra Davis	Jen Klein	November 15, 2017	2AZD06	3.74
19	7	"Ghetto Symphony"	Chris Robinson	Jewel McPherson	November 29, 2017	2AZD07	3.67
20	8	"A House Divided"	Paul McCrane	Ester Lou Weithers & Moisés Zamora	December 6, 2017	2AZD08	4.01
21	9	"Climax"	Bille Woodruff	Kimberly Ann Harrison	December 13, 2017	2AZD09	4.16
22	10	"Rise From the Ashes"	Kevin Tancharoen	Tom Donaghy & Robert Munic	March 28, 2018	2AZD10	4.65
23	11	"Take it to Church"	Salli Richardson-Whitfield	Leo Richardson	April 4, 2018	2AZD11	4.21
24	12	"Dreamers"	Millicent Shelton	Katie Wech	April 11, 2018	2AZD12	4.22
25	13	"Forward (E)Motion"	Jamie Travis	Jen Klein	April 18, 2018	2AZD13	4.00
26	14	"After the Set, It's the Afterparty"	John Krokidas	Ester Lou Weithers	April 25, 2018	2AZD14	3.81
27	15	"Let the Good Times Roll"	Chris Robinson	Jewel McPherson & Leo Richardson	May 2, 2018	2AZD15	3.79
28	16	"Take It or Leave It"	Paul McCrane	Moises Zamora	May 9, 2018	2AZD16	3.72
29	17	"Mrs. Rivera"	Tamra Davis	Kimberly Ann Harrison & Nina Gloster	May 16, 2018	2AZD17	3.81
30	18	"Thirty Days to Famous"	John Krokidas	Karin Gist & Jen Klein	May 23, 2018	2AZD18	3.95
When egos clash, Take 3's future as a group is at risk. Noah's continued substance use jeopardizes his relationships with the people who care about him most and Simone and Angel's relationship faces its biggest test yet. Meanwhile, Ayanna undergoes a major life change and Cassie (guest star Brandy Norwood) and Carlotta's sibling feud comes to a head

=== Season 3 (2018–19) ===
No. overall	No. in season	Title	Directed by	Written by	Original release date	Prod. code	U.S. viewers (millions)
31	1	"Secrets & Lies"	Bille Woodruff	Kimberly Ann Harrison	September 26, 2018	3AZD01	4.64
32	2	"Who's the Daddy"	Chris Robinson	Nina Gloster & David Gould	October 3, 2018	3AZD02	3.99
33	3	"A Family Affair"	Ruben Garcia	Randy Huggins & Jewel McPherson	October 10, 2018	3AZD03	4.11
34	4	"All Falls Down"	Cheryl Dunye	Michael C. Martin & Ester Lou Weithers	October 17, 2018	3AZD04	3.75
35	5	"Someday We'll All Be Free"	Janice Cooke	Leo Richardson & Jordan E. Cooper	October 31, 2018	3AZD05	3.28
36	6	"Ante Up"	John Krokidas	Randy Huggins & Rebecca Boss & Chris Masi	November 7, 2018	3AZD06	3.72
37	7	"Karma"	Erica Watson	Kimberly Ann Harrison & Nina Gloster	November 14, 2018	3AZD07	3.68
38	8	"Roots and Wings"	Scott Peters	Jewel McPherson	November 28, 2018	3AZD08	3.66
39	9	"Zion"	Bille Woodruff	Karin Gist	December 5, 2018	3AZD09	3.92
40	10	"When Stars Fall"	Chris Robinson	Ester Lou Weithers	March 13, 2019	3AZD10	3.57
41	11	"Watch the Throne"	Anna Mastro	Michael C. Martin	March 20, 2019	3AZD11	3.13
42	12	"Toxic"	Tasha Smith	Leo Richardson	March 27, 2019	3AZD12	3.13
43	13	"The Reckoning"	Joe Leonard	Kimberly Ann Harrison & Ruth Ferrera	April 3, 2019	3AZD13	3.39
44	14	"Amazing Grace"	Mario Van Peebles	Nina Gloster	April 10, 2019	3AZD14	3.11
45	15	"Lean on Me"	Scott Peters	Randy Huggins	April 17, 2019	3AZD15	3.23
46	16	"Square One"	Tasha Smith	Rebecca Boss & Chris Masi	April 24, 2019	3AZD16	3.01
47	17	"Proud Mary Keep On"	John Krokidas	Jewel McPherson	May 1, 2019	3AZD17	2.94
48	18	"When the Levee Breaks"	Bille Woodruff	Karin Gist & Kimberly Ann Harrison	May 8, 2019	3AZD18	3.43

== Ratings ==
=== Season 1 ===
Viewership and ratings per episode of List of Star episodes
No.	Title	Air date	Rating/share (18–49)	Viewers (millions)	DVR (18–49)	DVR viewers (millions)	Total (18–49)	Total viewers (millions)
1	"Pilot"	December 14, 2016	2.2/5	6.71	0.6	1.85	2.8	8.56
2	"The Devil You Know"	January 4, 2017	1.6/5	4.72	0.7	1.94	2.3	6.65
3	"Next of Kin"	January 11, 2017	1.4/5	4.25	0.7	—N/a	2.1	—N/a
4	"Code of Silence"	January 18, 2017	1.2/4	3.96	0.8	1.74	2.0	5.70
5	"New Voices"	January 25, 2017	1.2/4	3.79	0.7	1.82	1.9	5.61
6	"Infamous"	February 1, 2017	1.3/5	4.05	0.6	—N/a	1.9	—N/a
7	"Black Wherever I Go"	February 8, 2017	1.3/5	4.12	—N/a	—N/a	—N/a	—N/a
8	"Mama's Boy"	February 15, 2017	1.2/4	4.07	0.8	—N/a	2.0	—N/a
9	"Alibi"	February 22, 2017	1.2/4	3.89	0.8	—N/a	2.0	—N/a
10	"Boy Trouble"	March 1, 2017	1.1/4	3.36	—N/a	—N/a	—N/a	—N/a
11	"Saving Face"	March 8, 2017	1.2/4	3.80	0.7	—N/a	1.9	—N/a
12	"Showtime"	March 15, 2017	1.3/5	3.95	0.7	—N/a	2.0	—N/a

=== Season 2 ===
Viewership and ratings per episode of List of Star episodes
No.	Title	Air date	Rating/share (18–49)	Viewers (millions)	DVR (18–49)	DVR viewers (millions)	Total (18–49)	Total viewers (millions)
1	"The Winner Takes It All"	September 27, 2017	1.8/7	5.40	0.4	1.18	2.2	6.58 (Note: Live +7 ratings were not available, so Live +3 ratings have been used instead.)
2	"Insecure"	October 4, 2017	1.4/5	4.56	—N/a	—N/a	—N/a	—N/a
3	"FUA...Good Night!"	October 11, 2017	1.5/6	4.51	0.4	—N/a	1.9	—N/a
4	"It Ain't Over"	October 18, 2017	1.3/5	4.22	0.4	—N/a	1.7	—N/a
5	"May the Best Manager Win"	November 8, 2017	1.2/4	3.76	0.5	—N/a	1.7	—N/a
6	"Faking It"	November 15, 2017	1.2/4	3.74	—N/a	—N/a	—N/a	—N/a
7	"Ghetto Symphony"	November 29, 2017	1.2/4	3.67	0.4	—N/a	1.6	—N/a
8	"A House Divided"	December 6, 2017	1.2/4	4.01	0.6	—N/a	1.8	—N/a
9	"Climax"	December 13, 2017	1.3/5	4.16	—N/a	—N/a	—N/a	—N/a
10	"Rise From the Ashes"	March 28, 2018	1.5/6	4.65	—N/a	—N/a	—N/a	—N/a
11	"Take it to Church"	April 4, 2018	1.3/5	4.21	0.6	—N/a	1.9	—N/a
12	"Dreamers"	April 11, 2018	1.3/5	4.22	0.6	—N/a	1.9	—N/a
13	"Forward (E)Motion"	April 18, 2018	1.3/5	4.00	0.5	—N/a	1.8	—N/a
14	"After the Set, It's the Afterparty"	April 25, 2018	1.2/5	3.81	0.4	1.22	1.6	5.04
15	"Let the Good Times Roll"	May 2, 2018	1.2/5	3.79	0.5	—N/a	1.7	—N/a
16	"Take it or Leave It"	May 9, 2018	1.2/5	3.72	0.5	—N/a	1.7	—N/a
17	"Mrs. Rivera"	May 16, 2018	1.3/5	3.81	0.5	1.29	1.8	5.11
18	"Thirty Days to Famous"	May 23, 2018	1.3/5	3.95	0.5	1.35	1.8	5.30

=== Season 3 ===
Viewership and ratings per episode of List of Star episodes
No.	Title	Air date	Rating/share (18–49)	Viewers (millions)	DVR (18–49)	DVR viewers (millions)	Total (18–49)	Total viewers (millions)
1	"Secrets & Lies"	September 26, 2018	1.4/6	4.64	—N/a	—N/a	—N/a	—N/a
2	"Who's the Daddy"	October 3, 2018	1.2/5	3.99	0.5	—N/a	1.7	—N/a
3	"A Family Affair"	October 10, 2018	1.3/6	4.11	0.5	1.40	1.8	5.40
4	"All Falls Down"	October 17, 2018	1.2/5	3.75	0.4	1.28	1.6	5.04
5	"Someday We'll All Be Free"	October 31, 2018	0.9/4	3.28	0.6	1.50	1.5	4.78
6	"Ante Up"	November 7, 2018	1.1/5	3.72	0.5	1.39	1.6	5.11
7	"Karma"	November 14, 2018	1.1/5	3.68	0.5	1.41	1.6	5.09
8	"Roots and Wings"	November 28, 2018	1.1/5	3.66	0.4	1.15	1.5	4.81
9	"Zion"	December 5, 2018	1.2/5	3.92	0.5	—N/a	1.7	—N/a
10	"When Stars Fall"	March 13, 2019	1.1/5	3.57	0.4	—N/a	1.5	—N/a
11	"Watch the Throne"	March 20, 2019	1.0/5	3.13	0.4	1.18	1.4	4.32
12	"Toxic"	March 27, 2019	0.9/4	3.13	0.5	1.15	1.4	4.28
13	"The Reckoning"	April 3, 2019	1.0/5	3.39	0.4	—N/a	1.4	—N/a
14	"Amazing Grace"	April 10, 2019	0.9/4	3.11	0.5	1.18	1.4	4.30
15	"Lean on Me"	April 17, 2019	0.9/4	3.23	0.5	1.24	1.4	4.47
16	"Square One"	April 24, 2019	0.9/4	3.01	0.4	1.21	1.3	4.22
17	"Proud Mary Keep On"	May 1, 2019	0.9/4	2.94	0.5	1.27	1.4	4.21
18	"When the Levee Breaks"	May 8, 2019	1.0/5	3.43	0.4	—N/a	1.4	—N/a
