= Paperboy (disambiguation) =

A paperboy is a young person delivering newspapers to homes.

Paperboy or Paperboys may also refer to:

== Film and television ==
- The Paperboy (1994 film), a Canadian horror film by Douglas Jackson, named after the role
- The Paperboy (2012 film), an American drama by Lee Daniels
- Paperboys (film), a 2001 American documentary by Mike Mills
- The Paperboy, a fictional character in the British sitcom Fawlty Towers
- Paper Boy, a 2018 Indian romantic film

== Literature ==
- The Paperboy (novel), a 1995 novel by Pete Dexter
- Paperboy (novel), a 2013 novel by Vince Vawter
- Paperboy, a 1999 novel by Isabelle Holland
- Paperboy, a 2011 memoir by Northern Irish writer Tony Macaulay
- The Paperboy (children's book), a 1997 children's book by Dav Pilkey

== Music ==
- Paperboy (rapper) (born 1969), American rapper
- Eli "Paperboy" Reed (born 1982), American singer
- Paperboy Fabe (born 1984), American music producer
- Paperboys (Norwegian duo), a Norwegian hip hop duo
- The Paperboys (Canadian band), a Canadian folk music band

=== Songs ===
- "Paperboy", a song by Charles Hamilton, feat. B.o.B
- "Paperboy", a song by Stabilo from Cupid?
- "Paperboy", a song from the 2011 Bruce Hornsby musical SCKBSTD

== Other uses ==
- Paperboy (video game), a 1985 arcade game by Atari Games, named after the role
  - Paperboy 2, the 1991 sequel
- Paperboy Prince, American artist, community activist, and politician
- Josh Wilson (baseball) (born 1981), nicknamed "The Paperboy", American baseball shortstop

== See also ==
- Newspaper Boy (disambiguation)
