= God's Pocket (disambiguation) =

God's Pocket may refer to:

- God's Pocket, a 1983 novel written by Pete Dexter
- God's Pocket, a 2014 film adaptation of the 1983 novel
- God's Pocket Marine Provincial Park, a provincial park and notable scuba diving site near Vancouver Island, Canada
- God's Pocket Peak, a peak in the Jarbidge Mountains in northeastern Nevada
