= Amiyah Scott =

American actress

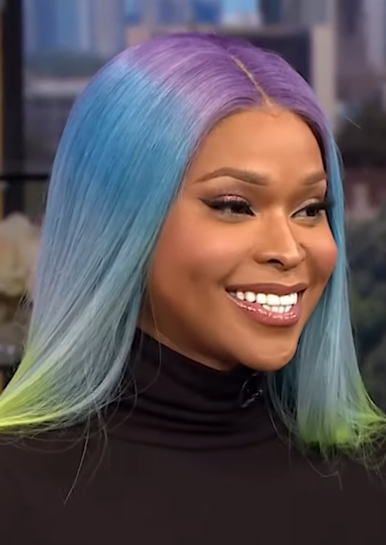
- Scott during an interview in June 2019
- Born: January 11, 1988 (age 38); Manhattan, New York, US
- Occupations: Actress, model, author, dancer
- Years active: 2000–present

Amiyah Scott (born January 11, 1988) is an American actress, model, author, and dancer. She is known for her presence on social media apps such as Instagram, as a fixture in the LGBT ball community, and for her role as Cotton in the Fox television series Star (2016–2019). She also appeared in the eighth season of The Real Housewives of Atlanta.

== Early life ==
Amiyah Scott was born in Manhattan on January 11, 1988. She was raised in New Orleans, Louisiana.

As an adolescent, she experienced bullying due to her being transgender. At 15 years old, she moved out of her parents' house and explored entrepreneurship opportunities. Since young adulthood, she has been a well-respected member of the LGBT ball community.

== Career ==
=== Acting ===
Scott became an internet celebrity when videos of her performing as part of ballrooms were uploaded to YouTube. She then became "Insta-famous" following the posting of a before-and-after photo which contrasted her young self, styled as male, and her current self, the self-actualized female.

In 2015, it was announced that Scott had been added to the cast of The Real Housewives of Atlanta for its eighth season; she was the first transgender woman to be cast in the Real Housewives franchise. Scott later left the show, stating that she was offended by the way the producers wanted her to behave, which she believed would have been an exploitation of her trans identity. Producers on Bravo later claimed the reason Scott was not on the show anymore was because her transgender identity was "not enough to make [her] interesting."

Shortly after her departure from Housewives, Scott was cast by Lee Daniels in the show Star; this became Scott's first acting role. She starred on the series from 2016 to 2019, for three seasons.

=== Other ventures ===
==== Activism ====
In addition to acting, Scott is a motivational speaker and activist with the goal of giving a voice to transgender women. Her presentations focus on the themes of bullying, self-esteem, and self-acceptance. At an event in Atlanta hosted by the Gay & Lesbian Association against Defamation (GLAAD), the GLAAD President, Sarah Kate Ellis, said that "Amiyah Scott is a talented actress and brilliant advocate who uses her voice to uplift transgender women of color and educate fans everywhere about transgender people and issues. At a time when LGBTQ visibility in the South is critical to moving our community forward, we are proud to stand with women like Amiyah to promote messages of love and acceptance." In addition, Scott is also vocal with politics. For example, she criticized some of the Trump administration's policies together with other activists in the transgender community such as Laverne Cox and Janet Mock.

==== Books ====
Scott published her first book, a memoir called Memoirs of a Mermaid, on March 31, 2019.

==== Cosmetics ====
Scott has a beauty line, Amiyah Beauty, with RivalWorld. Her first product is a lip-gloss.

== Awards ==
Year	Award	Notes
2018	GLAAD Rising Star Award	Bestowed at GLAAD Atlanta Gala

== Filmography ==
Year	Title	Role	Notes
2016–2019	Star	Cotton	48 episodes (Seasons 1–3)
2021	Legendary	Herself (Guest Judge)	Episode "Plastic Fantastic"
2025	Operation: Aunties	Aminah	

=== Podcasts ===
Year	TV show
May 7, 2019	LGBTQ&A
