= Jude Demorest =

American actress and singer (born 1992)

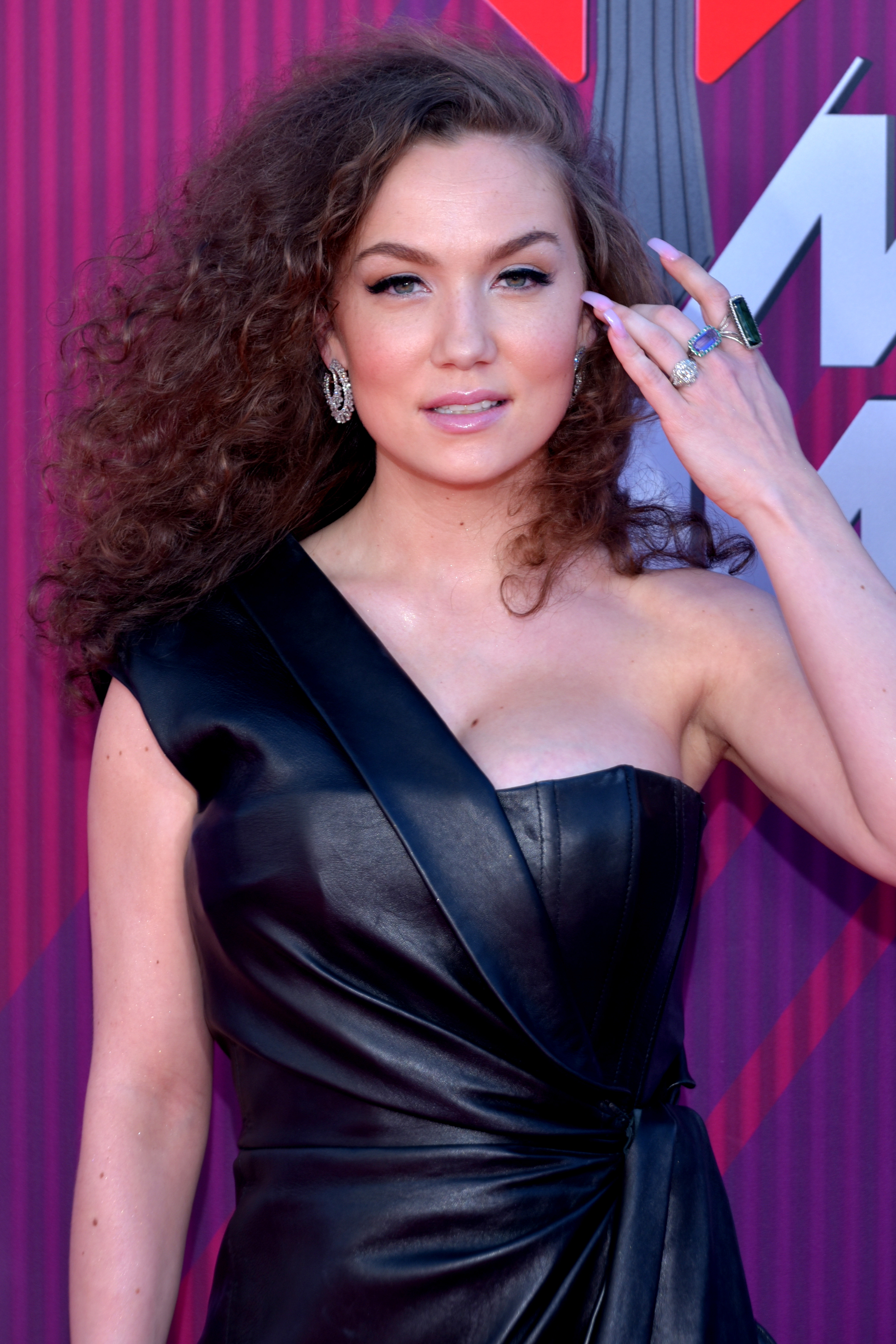
- Demorest in 2019
- Born: March 11, 1992 (age 34); Michigan, U.S.
- Occupations: Singer; songwriter; actress
- Years active: 2009–present
- Spouse: Ammo (m. 2016)
- Children: 4

Claire Jude Demorest (born March 11, 1992) is an American actress and singer who is known for her roles in Dallas and Star.

== Early life ==
Demorest was born in Michigan, and grew up in a very religious family. She said in an interview "I grew up in church, seven days a week. The service was very music-driven, so the pastor created a performing-arts school down the street. There was drama, dance, and choir rehearsal—it was my training."

At the age of 16, Demorest moved to Los Angeles to pursue an acting career. After trying everything from backup dancing to singing, she signed with Epic Records under producer L.A. Reid.

== Career ==
Demorest started her career in minor parts, as extras and background dancers in multiple shows and films prior to getting a shot in the 2009 short History of Made Up Things. She had a recurring role on Dallas as Candance, leaving the show after 6 appearances. During the summer of 2016, writer, director, and executive producer Lee Daniels held a nationwide search for Fox's girl-group series, Star (debuting December 14) ending in May 2019. "It was 10 auditions and Lee was part of every one," Demorest said.

== Personal life ==
Demorest married music producer Ammo on April 24, 2016. On September 4, 2018, Demorest announced via Instagram that she was pregnant. On November 11, 2018, she gave birth to their son, Judah. On June 14, 2021, she gave birth to their second son, Jori. On January 1, 2024, it was announced that she and Ammo were expecting their third child, a girl. On April 6, 2024, she gave birth to their third child and first daughter, Jubilee. On June 30, 2026, she gave birth to their third son and fourth child, Jean-Cooley.

== Filmography ==
Television and film roles
Year	Title	Role	Notes
2009	History of Made up Things	Whitney	Short film
2010	Jonas	Andrea	Episode: "And... Action!"
2012	The Ghastly Love of Johnny X	Mickey O'Flyn Groupie	Film; uncredited
2012	Hollywood Heights	Amber	Episode: "Loren Doesn't Make the Cut"
2014	Dallas	Candace	Recurring role, 6 episodes
2014	Bipolar	Sarah	Film; as Claire Demorest
2014	The Middle	Samantha	Episode: "The Table"
2015	Axiom	Hip Hop Robot	Short film
2016–2019	Star	Star Davis	Lead role
2026	Diarra from Detroit	Homeland Farms member	Season 2, Episode 3

== Discography ==
=== Songwriting credits ===
Year	Title	Artist	Album	Credits
2012	Last 1 Standing	Cymphonique Miller and Max Schneider	How to Rock soundtrack	Co-writer
2016	Work from Home	Fifth Harmony	7/27	Co-writer
2016	Nasty	Brooke Candy	Non-album single	Co-writer
2017	Whatcha Gonna Do	Star cast	Star soundtrack	Co-writer
2017	Down	Fifth Harmony	Fifth Harmony	Co-writer
2018	There for You	Herself	Star soundtrack	Writer
2018	Madonna	Star cast	Star soundtrack	Writer
2019
2019	Davis Street	Herself	Star soundtrack	Writer
2019	This & That	Star cast	Star soundtrack	Writer
2019	"Bounce Back"	Little Mix	Non-album single	Co-writer
