= The Paperboy (2012 film) =

American film by Lee Daniels

- Theatrical release poster
- Directed by: Lee Daniels
- Written by: Lee Daniels; Pete Dexter
- Based on: The Paperboy by Pete Dexter
- Produced by: Hilary Shor; Lee Daniels; Avi Lerner; Ed Cathell III; Cassian Elwes
- Starring: Matthew McConaughey; Zac Efron; David Oyelowo; Macy Gray; John Cusack; Nicole Kidman
- Cinematography: Roberto Schaefer
- Edited by: Joe Klotz
- Music by: Mario Grigorov
- Production companies: Nu Image; Lee Daniels Entertainment
- Distributed by: Millennium Films
- Release dates: May 24, 2012 (Cannes Film Festival); October 5, 2012
- Running time: 107 minutes
- Country: United States
- Language: English
- Budget: $12.5 million
- Box office: $3.7 million

The Paperboy is a 2012 American crime drama film co-written and directed by Lee Daniels and based on Pete Dexter's 1995 novel of the same name. It follows Miami reporter Ward Jansen who returns to his hometown in Florida to investigate a murder case involving a death row inmate. The film stars Matthew McConaughey, Zac Efron, David Oyelowo, Macy Gray, John Cusack, and Nicole Kidman.

The film was produced by Daniels, Hilary Shor, Avi Lerner, Ed Cathell III, and Cassian Elwes. It premiered at the 2012 Cannes Film Festival on May 24, 2012, and October 5, 2012, worldwide. It grossed $102,706 in its opening weekend and $3.8 million worldwide, against a budget of $12.5 million, making it a box office bomb. Despite its mixed reviews, Kidman's performance drew Golden Globe and Screen Actors Guild Award nominations.

== Plot ==
In the summer of 1969, Anita, former maid of the Jansen family, recounts the events surrounding Ward Jansen, an idealistic reporter for The Miami Times, who returns to his hometown of Lately, Florida, to investigate the controversial murder conviction of Hillary Van Wetter, a brutish alligator hunter sentenced to death for the 1965 killing of a corrupt local sheriff. Ward and his colleague, Yardley Acheman—an English-accented journalist—aim to expose procedural flaws in the trial, including lost evidence they attribute to systemic injustice. Their efforts intersect with Charlotte Bless, an Alabama woman who, after exchanging letters with Van Wetter, believes him innocent and plans to marry him upon his exoneration.

Ward enlists his younger brother, Jack, as a driver for the investigation. Jack, a college dropout working as a paperboy for their estranged father W.W.’s local newspaper, becomes infatuated with Charlotte. Their relationship is complicated by Charlotte’s open sexuality; she rebuffs Jack’s advances to preserve their friendship, though she later saves his life after a jellyfish sting by urinating on his wounds—an act sensationalized by W.W. in his newspaper, sparking tension between Jack and Yardley. During a subsequent altercation, Jack directs a racial slur at Yardley, straining their rapport and unsettling Anita, Jack’s confidante and maternal figure since his mother’s departure.

The investigation leads the group to Van Wetter’s uncle, Tyree, a reclusive swamp dweller. Tyree reluctantly provides an alibi, claiming he and Van Wetter were stealing sod from an Ormond Beach golf course the night of the murder. While Yardley asserts he verified the alibi with an anonymous developer, Ward grows suspicious of Yardley’s motives. His doubts intensify after a violent incident at a bar leaves Ward severely beaten. Jack, witnessing the aftermath, attacks one assailant but is unable to prevent his brother’s hospitalization.

Amid the turmoil, Charlotte and Jack share a brief romantic encounter, though she reaffirms her commitment to Van Wetter. Meanwhile, Yardley publishes an exposé co-authored by Ward, securing Van Wetter’s pardon. Post-release, Van Wetter’s true nature—racist, abusive, and manipulative—emerges, contrasting the persona he crafted in letters to Charlotte. He forces her into a traumatic life in the swamps, where she eventually sends Jack a plea for help. The letter is intercepted until Anita discreetly delivers it at W.W.’s wedding, prompting Jack and a recovering Ward to confront Van Wetter.

The brothers discover Charlotte murdered, triggering a violent clash. Van Wetter kills Ward by slashing his throat and pursues Jack, who escapes using his swimming skills. Van Wetter is later apprehended, convicted of Ward and Charlotte’s murders, and executed. Anita concludes her account noting Jack’s reunion with his estranged mother at Ward’s funeral and his enduring grief over Charlotte, his unrequited first love.

The investigation’s fallout exposes deeper deceptions: Yardley, revealed to be an American fabricating an English identity to advance his career, admits to fabricating the developer’s testimony. Ward’s hidden homosexuality, disclosed by Yardley, further underscores the personal and professional betrayals permeating the case. The tragedy leaves Jack adrift, towing his brother and Charlotte’s bodies home, symbolizing the irreversible consequences of misplaced idealism and fractured relationships.

== Cast ==
- Matthew McConaughey as Ward Jansen
- Zac Efron as Jack Jansen
- David Oyelowo as Yardley Acheman
- Macy Gray as Anita Chester
- John Cusack as Hillary Van Wetter
- Nicole Kidman as Charlotte Bless
- Scott Glenn as W.W. Jansen
- Ned Bellamy as Tyree Van Wetter
- Nealla Gordon as Ellen Guthrie

== Production ==
After the critical acclaim for his previous film Precious, Daniels was sent many possible scripts for a follow-up including several lucrative offers. However he decided to pass on these stating that "I couldn’t get off on it" and stating that he instead "went with what my spirit told me to do". Daniels had stated that along with Push, he viewed The Paperboy as "one of the great, great novels". He particularly enjoyed the characters in the novel, finding them extremely relatable, though he found the plot was somewhat nonsensical and thus viewed the movie as an attempt to create a more coherent storyline.

Daniels was initially nervous about meeting Kidman although he calmed down once she told him "I'm just a working girl, Lee. You've got to direct me." Kidman herself was unsure if she could portray her character, only gaining confidence after Daniels introduced her to several women who, similar to Kidman's character, had romantic involvements with prisoners, one of whom told her that she believed she could portray such a relationship convincingly. During the shoot Kidman only communicated to Cusack as her character, Charlotte, stating "I wanted to deal with him as the character and have him deal with me as the character". As a joke after filming wrapped, Cusack went up to Kidman and formally introduced himself. One notable scene featured Kidman urinating on Efron after he gets badly stung by a swarm of jellyfish. Although neither the actors involved nor Daniels had any problem with filming the scene, Daniels admitted to getting cold feet while editing and consulted with Kidman about possibly removing the scene who reportedly told him "Lee, you made me pee on Zac Efron. If you don't put it in the movie, you need to man up."

== Release ==
The film premiered on the 65th Cannes Film Festival on May 28, 2012, to mixed reviews. Robbie Collin at The Daily Telegraph wrote that "Readers of the film's Wikipedia page may spot the claim that it received 'the longest sustained standing ovation of the festival at 16 minutes'. As someone who was present at that screening, and the cacophonous quarter-hour of jeering, squawking and mooing that followed, I think Wikipedia may want to clarify its definition of 'standing ovation'." The Guardian surmised, "those who prefer delicate watercolours had better stand well back. It makes a lurid splash."

The Paperboy also screened at the 2012 Ischia Global Film & Music Festival, 39th edition of the Flanders International Film Festival Ghent, 2012 New Orleans Film Festival, 50th New York Film Festival (to which Kidman received a tribute gala), 2012 Toronto International Film Festival, and the 2012 Stockholm International Film Festival.

== Reception ==
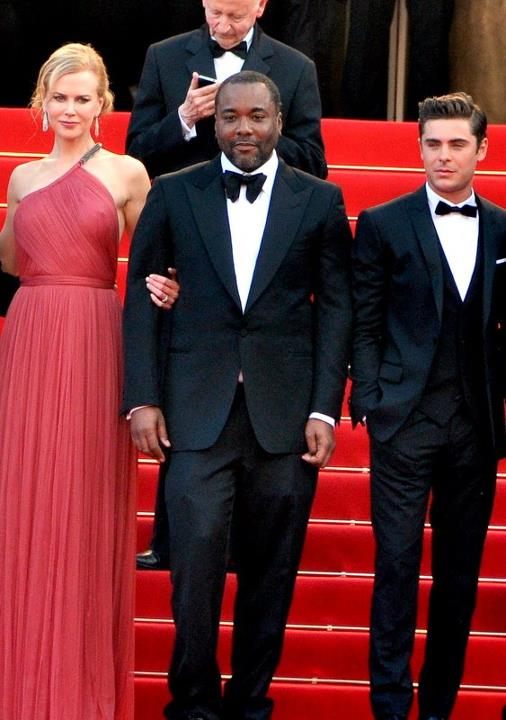
Nicole Kidman, Lee Daniels, and Zac Efron promoting the film at the 2012 Cannes Film Festival

Reception to The Paperboy has been mixed with some critics comparing it to Lee Daniels' directorial debut, Shadowboxer. Robbie Collin of The Daily Telegraph disliked the film at its Cannes premiere, but positively reappraised it almost a year later on its UK release. "As a piece of art this is all lust, no caution; a heady mirage of sex, swamps and soul music that wants nothing more than for you to share in the joke. Thank goodness I finally got it," he wrote. Most praise has been for Nicole Kidman's portrayal of Charlotte Bless, and Collin wrote that she "has not been this good since Dogville (2003), and...secretes sensuality like a slug does slime". Peter Bradshaw of The Guardian said, "Nicole Kidman really is terrifically good as Charlotte: funny, sexy, poignantly vulnerable". Sophia Pande of Nepali Times wrote, "The Paperboy may not be to your taste. It is often over the top and very violent, but this is Lee Daniel’s [sic] style. It is this very style backed by intelligence, undeniable directorial skill, and an intimate knowledge of his deeply flawed but very human characters that make for such a compelling film." Nonetheless, the Alliance of Women Film Journalists nominated Kidman in the category, "Actress Most in Need of a New Agent."

On Rotten Tomatoes, the film holds an approval rating of 45% based on 143 reviews, with an average rating of 5.20/10. The website's critics consensus reads: "Trashy and melodramatic, The Paperboy is enlivened by a strong cast and a steamy, sordid plot, but it's uneven and often veers into camp." On Metacritic, the film has a weighted average score of 45 out of 100, based on 38 critics, indicating "mixed or average reviews".

The staff of The A.V. Club named it the worst film of 2012. The New Yorker film critic Michael Schulman called the film "deliriously tawdry and nonsensical". Stephen Whitty of the Newark Star-Ledger wrote of the film, "Simply ugly trash," while Mick LaSalle of the San Francisco Chronicle basically recommended one watch the movie "with the indispensable aid of that wonderful late-20th century invention: fast forward.". A.O. Scott of the New York Times said the film was "what cinema scholars (and speakers fluent in the film’s native idiom) might call a hot mess.".

== Soundtrack ==
Singer Mariah Carey wrote and recorded a song titled "Mesmerized" for the film's soundtrack. The song, however, was not released to coincide with the film. It was released on October 2, 2020, on her special collection of previously hard-to-find and unreleased songs, The Rarities. The song was produced by Carey along with Loris Holland and Randy Jackson.

== Accolades ==
| Event | Award | Category | Recipient(s) | Result |
|---|---|---|---|---|
| 2nd AACTA International Awards | AACTA Award | Best International Actress | Nicole Kidman | Nominated |
| Alliance of Women Film Journalists | Alliance of Women Film Journalists Award | Actress Most in Need of a New Agent | Nicole Kidman | Nominated |
| 65th Cannes Film Festival | Palme d'Or | Best Film | Lee Daniels | Nominated |
| 19th Screen Actors Guild Awards | Screen Actors Guild Award | Outstanding Performance by a Female Actor in a Supporting Role | Nicole Kidman | Nominated |
| 70th Golden Globe Awards | Golden Globe Award | Best Supporting Actress – Motion Picture | Nicole Kidman | Nominated |
| Indiewire Year-End Critics Poll | Indiewire Critics Award | Best Ensemble | | Nominated |
| Indiewire Year-End Critics Poll | Indiewire Critics Award | Best Original Score or Soundtrack | Mario Grigorov | Nominated |
| Indiewire Year-End Critics Poll | Indiewire Critics Award | Best Supporting Performance | Nicole Kidman | Nominated |
| 2012 Village Voice Film Poll | Village Voice Award | Best Actress | Nicole Kidman | Nominated |
| 2012 Village Voice Film Poll | Village Voice Award | Best Film | Lee Daniels | Nominated |
| 2012 Village Voice Film Poll | Village Voice Award | Best Supporting Actor | John Cusack | Nominated |
| 2012 Village Voice Film Poll | Village Voice Award | Best Supporting Actor | Zac Efron | Nominated |
| 2012 Village Voice Film Poll | Village Voice Award | Best Supporting Actor | David Oyelowo | Nominated |
| 2012 Village Voice Film Poll | Village Voice Award | Best Supporting Actress | Macy Gray | Nominated |
| 2012 Village Voice Film Poll | Village Voice Award | Best Supporting Actress | Nicole Kidman | Nominated |
| 2012 Village Voice Film Poll | Village Voice Award | Worst Film | Lee Daniels | Nominated |
| 2012 Austin Film Critics Association Awards | AFCA Award | Special Award for the Best Body of Work | Matthew McConaughey | Won |
| 2012 Central Ohio Film Critics Association Awards | COFCA Award | Actor of the Year | Matthew McConaughey | Won |
