= Nealla Gordon =

American actress

Nealla Gordon is an American actress. She has appeared in a number of Lee Daniels's productions, including films Precious (2009), The Paperboy (2012), and The Butler (2013). She portrayed the role of Harlow Carter on the first season of Fox prime time soap opera Empire in 2015. In 2017, Gordon was cast in another Daniels's soap opera, Star playing villainous Arlene Morgan.

== Career ==
Gordon began her career in early 1990s, appearing on television shows include Thirtysomething, Doogie Howser, M.D. and Murphy Brown. Her other television credits include Touched by an Angel, Will & Grace, Desperate Housewives, NYPD Blue, and Grey's Anatomy. Gordon has a minor role portraying Nancy Kassebaum in The Butler.

== Filmography ==
=== Film ===
Year	Title	Role	Notes
2005	A Lot like Love	Caterer	
2008	Merem Melek	Sonya	
2009	Precious	Mrs. Lichtenstein	
2011	No Strings Attached	Lydia	
2012	Wrong	Colleague Jodie	
2012	The Paperboy	Ellen Guthrie	
2013	The Butler	Nancy Kassebaum	
2021	The United States vs. Billie Holiday	Courthouse Reporter	

=== Television ===
Year	Title	Role	Notes
1991	Thirtysomething	Kooky Coworker	Episode: "Melissa in Wonderland"
1991	Sibs	Anna	Episode: "The Big Hurt"
1991	Growing Pains	Waitress	Episode: "Bad Day Cafe"
1992	Doogie Howser, M.D.	Suzanne	Episode: "Club Medicine"
1992	Dream On	Corinne	Episode: "Terms of Employment"
1993	Murphy Brown	Eileen	Episode: "Games Mother Play"
1993	Daddy Dearest	Justin's Mother	Episode: "Raging Bully"
1993	Shameful Secrets	Margaret Chapman	Television film
1994	To My Daughter with Love	Mrs. Lewiston	Television film
1995	Ed McBain's 87th Precinct: Lightning	Miss Delongis	Television film
1996	Life's Work	Judge Randall	2 episodes
1997	Over the Top	Ms. Kleiger	Episode: "The Bee Story"
1998	Beyond Belief: Fact or Fiction	Lucy Robins	2 episodes
1998	Touched by an Angel	Young Elaine	Episode: "Elija"
1999	Rescue 77	—	Episode: "Tunnel Vision"
2000	Once and Again	Mrs. Sepnefski	Episode: "Sneaky Feelings"
2001	Dharma & Greg	Kathy	Episode: "Judy & Greg"
2001	Philly	Shirley	Episode: "Live and Leg Die"
2002	Will & Grace	Eileen	Episode: "Someone Old, Someplace New"
2003	American Dreams	Eleanor	Episode: "I Wanna Hold Your Hand"
2003	Judging Amy	Joyce	Episode: "Tricks of the Trade"
2004	7th Heaven	Kate	Episode: "Little White Lies: Part 1"
2004	Desperate Housewives	Mrs. Bukowski	Episode: "Pretty Little Picture"
2005	NYPD Blue	Esther Zell	Episode: "Lenny Scissorhands"
2005	Medium	Elisha's Mother	Episode: "Penny for Your Thoughts"
2005	Entourage	Casting Director	Episode: "My Maserati Does 185"
2008	Weeds	Lee Milne	Episode: "The Love Circle Overlap"
2009	Grey's Anatomy	Jill Boyd	Episode: "Invest in Love"
2010	Huge	Ian's mom	2 episodes
2010–2011	The Defenders	Judge Susan White	6 episodes
2013	NCIS: Los Angeles	Administrator	Episode: "Big Brother"
2013	Masters of Sex	Nurse Lang	Episode: "Fallout"
2015	Empire	Harlow Carter	4 episodes
2016–2019	Star	Arlene Morgan	18 episodes
2018	SEAL Team	Holly Baxter	Episode: "Never Say Die"
2021	The Ms. Pat Show	Denise	Episode: "Lights Out"
