= Paris Trout (novel) =

1988 novel by Pete Dexter

- First edition
- Author: Pete Dexter
- Language: English
- Genre: Fiction
- Published: 1988
- Publisher: Random House
- Publication place: United States
- Pages: 306

Paris Trout is a 1988 American novel written by Pete Dexter. It was the winner of the National Book Award for Fiction.

The novel was adapted into a TV film of the same name.

== Plot ==
In a small Georgia town in the 1950s, a bigoted store owner named Paris Trout kills a black man's younger sister and wounds his mother when a car deal between them goes wrong.

== Critical reception ==
The Los Angeles Times called the novel "a masterpiece, complex and breath-taking."

When the novel was published, humorist and author Roy Blount Jr. provided a blurb for its promotion, writing, "I put it down once to wipe off the sweat,” a remark that has since been cited by other writers as a notably memorable piece of praise including in 2007 when a New York Times writer asked, “Do they give awards for this kind of thing?”
