= Paris Trout =

1991 film by Stephen Gyllenhaal

- Genre: Drama
- Based on: Paris Trout by Pete Dexter
- Written by: Pete Dexter
- Directed by: Stephen Gyllenhaal
- Starring: Dennis Hopper; Barbara Hershey; Ed Harris
- Music by: David Shire
- Country of origin: United States
- Original language: English

Production
- Executive producer: Diana Kerew
- Producers: Frank Konigsberg; Larry Sanitsky
- Cinematography: Robert Elswit
- Editor: Harvey Rosenstock
- Running time: 100 minutes
- Production companies: Konigsberg/Sanitsky Productions; Viacom Pictures

Original release
- Network: Showtime
- Release: April 20, 1991

Paris Trout is a 1991 American drama television film directed by Stephen Gyllenhaal and written by Pete Dexter, based on his 1988 novel, and starring Dennis Hopper, Barbara Hershey, and Ed Harris. It premiered on Showtime on April 20, 1991.

== Plot ==
Paris Trout is an unrepentant racist in 1949 Georgia. The greedy and paranoid shopkeeper murders the sister of a black man who refuses to repay Trout’s IOU. When Trout is arrested for the crime, he is stunned and enraged, showing himself to be a man of the Old South. Lawyer Harry Seagraves arrives to calm the waters in court but is soon caught in crimes of his own, including a dangerous and doomed affair with Trout's wife.

== Cast ==
- Dennis Hopper as Paris Trout
- Barbara Hershey as Hanna Trout
- Ed Harris as Harry Seagraves
- Ray McKinnon as Carl Bonner
- Tina Lifford as Mary Sayers
- Darnita Henry as Rosie Sayers
- Eric Ware as Henry Ray Sayers
- RonReaco Lee as Chester Sayers
- Gary Bullock as Buster Devonne
- Sharlene Ross as Mother Trout's Nurse
- Jim Peck as Estes Singletray
- Dan Biggers as Mayor Harn
- Ernest Dixon as Truck Driver
- Wallace Wilkinson as Dr. Brewer
- Ron Leggett as Glass Man
