= John Krokidas =

American film director

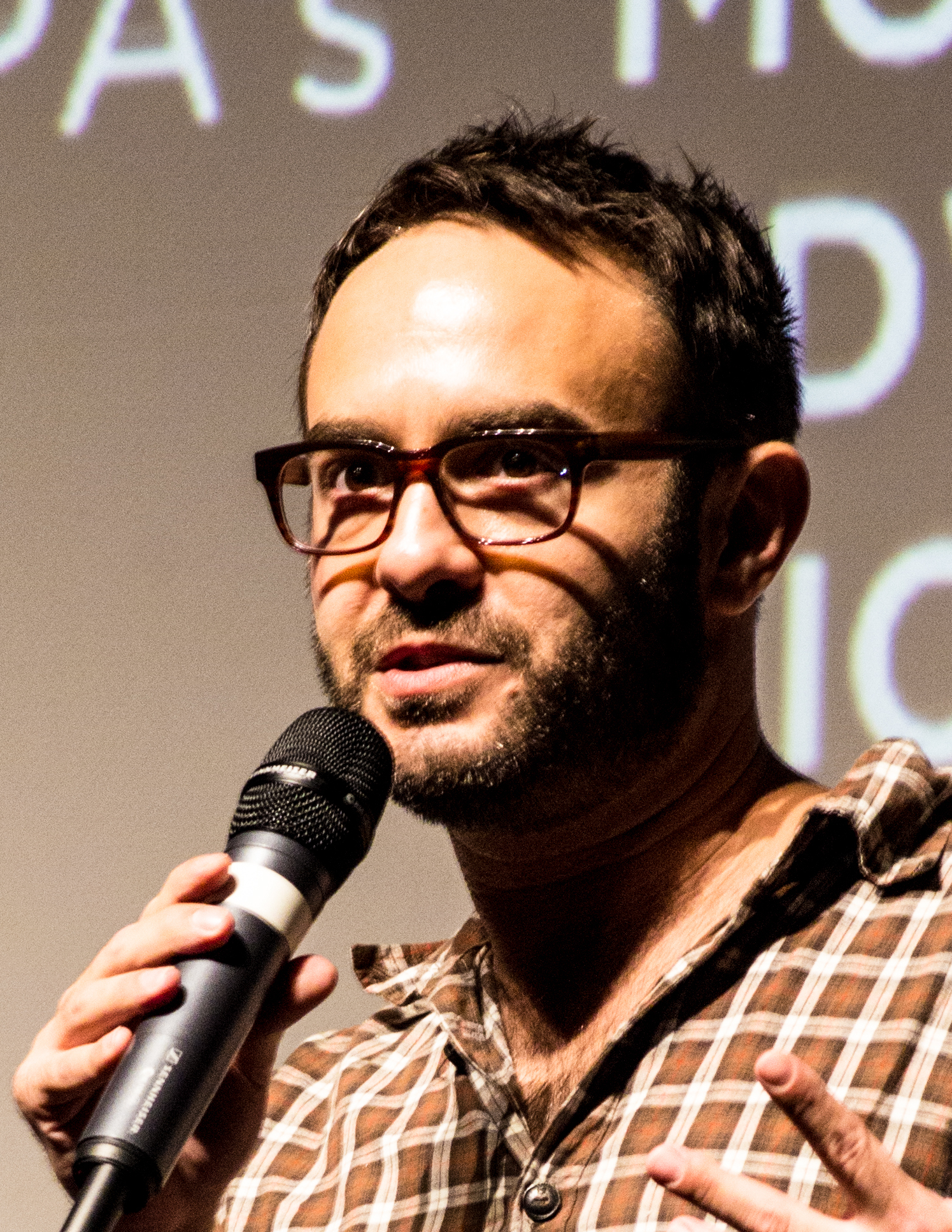
- Krokidas in 2013
- Born: Springfield, Massachusetts, United States
- Education: Yale University (B.A.); New York University
- Occupations: Film director, screenwriter, producer
- Years active: 1998–present
- Known for: Kill Your Darlings (2013)

John Krokidas is an American film director, screenwriter, and producer, best known for his directorial debut film, the 2013 biographical drama Kill Your Darlings.

== Personal life ==
Krokidas attended Yale University, where he originally enrolled into acting. Krokidas graduated with a B.A. in theater and American studies, as well as a Distinction in the Major. He later attended New York University, where he studied the Graduate Film program. Krokidas has Greek, Italian, and Jewish ancestry. His maternal grandmother was Jewish.

He resides in New York and is openly gay.

== Career ==
During his time at New York University, Krokidas began directing short films such as Shame No More (1999) and Slo-Mo (2001). After graduation, he signed a three-year contract with film company Miramax Films, having earlier done script coverage for the studio. In 2013, Krokidas directed, co-wrote and produced his first feature film, Kill Your Darlings, starring Daniel Radcliffe.

== Filmography ==
Year	Title	Director	Producer	Writer
1998	Billy Twist		Yes	
1999	Shame No More	Yes		Yes
2001	Slo-Mo	Yes		Yes
2008	Anatomy of a Socially Awkward Situation			Yes
2013	Kill Your Darlings	Yes	Yes	Yes

Year	Title	Notes
2014	Black Box	Episodes: "Who Are You" and "Exceptional or Dead"
2016	Wayward Pines	Episode: "Once Upon a Time in Wayward Pines"
2017–19	Star	6 episodes
2017	American Crime	Episode: "Season Three: Episode Seven"
2018	Empire	Episode: "Pay for Their Presumptions"
2022	The Equalizer	Episode: "Somewhere Over The Hudson"

== See also ==
- Dramatic license
- LGBT culture in New York City
- List of LGBT people from New York City
- NYC Pride March
