= Newspaper Boy =

Newspaper Boy may refer to:

- Paperboy, a boy who delivers newspapers
- Newspaper Boy (1955 film), Indian Malayalam movie
- Newspaper Boy (1997 film), Indian Malayalam movie

== See also ==
- Paperboy (disambiguation)
