= Star (TV series) =

2016 American music drama television series

- Genre: Musical drama
- Created by: Lee Daniels; Tom Donaghy
- Starring: Jude Demorest; Brittany O'Grady; Ryan Destiny; Amiyah Scott; Quincy Brown; Benjamin Bratt; Queen Latifah; Miss Lawrence; Luke James; Michael Michele; Stephen Dorff; Lance Gross; Brandy Norwood; William Levy; Matthew Noszka
- Composer: James S. Levine
- Country of origin: United States
- Original language: English
- No. of seasons: 3
- No. of episodes: 48 (list of episodes)

Production
- Executive producers: Lee Daniels; Tom Donaghy; Pamela Oas Williams; Effie Brown; Karin Gist; Jason Richman
- Producer: Michelle Fowler
- Production locations: Atlanta, Georgia
- Cinematography: Rodney Taylor
- Editor: Joe Leonard
- Running time: 43 minutes
- Production companies: Lee Daniels Entertainment; 20th Century Fox Television

Original release
- Network: Fox
- Release: December 14, 2016 – May 8, 2019

Star is an American musical drama television series created by Lee Daniels and Tom Donaghy for the Fox Broadcasting Company. It revolves around three talented young singers who navigate the music business on their road to success and stars Jude Demorest, Brittany O'Grady and Ryan Destiny. The series, which is set in Atlanta, consists of original music, along with musical fantasy sequences, as dreams of the future. Queen Latifah, Benjamin Bratt, Amiyah Scott and Quincy Brown co-star.

The series premiered on December 14, 2016. With the premiere of the series, Amiyah Scott became the third openly transgender person to play a trans major character in a scripted television drama series in America, after Laverne Cox on Orange Is the New Black and Jamie Clayton on Sense8.

Star is a joint production between Lee Daniels Entertainment and 20th Century Fox Television and syndicated by 20th Television. On February 22, 2017, Fox renewed the series for a second season, which premiered on September 27, 2017, and crossed over with other Fox series Empire.

On May 10, 2018, Fox renewed the series for a third season. Season 3 premiered on September 26, 2018, and aired on Fox Wednesdays at 9:00 PM.

On May 10, 2019, Fox cancelled the series after three seasons.

== Plot ==
Star Davis, an 18-year-old orphan, leaves her foster home to save her younger sister Simone Davis, who Star has been separated from since their mother's death, from physical and sexual abuse at her foster home. While escaping the tragedy, Star finds muse in a singer/songwriter, Alexandra Crane, a New York resident who lives in her celebrity father's shadow. Star offers Alex a proposal to escape and leave town with them to become a singing group. They move to Atlanta, Georgia and seek refuge in a surrogate godmother, Carlotta Brown, who is a close friend and singing partner of Star and Simone's mother. Carlotta made a promise to look after the girls after their mother's death and would protect them. She persuades the girls to work to make ends meet and isn't enthusiastic about the girls chasing their dreams; instead, she wants them to attend and be active in church. Finding odds to make their endeavors come true, they struggled to get a record deal and found hope in a music producer, Jahil Rivera, who took a chance on them. Within months, developing themselves as rising new artists in Atlanta, gaining the name of the group "Big Trouble", they face new troubles in their relationships with each other and with their pasts coming back to haunt them. However, they escape the many problems of their past and begin to succeed in gaining recognition. 'Big Trouble' soon won notable competitions, which led to a major record deal. The girls eventually sign with a record label, Midtown Sound, as a favor from The Lyon Family of Empire Entertainment and soon begin their journey as professional R&B/Pop artists TAKE 3. Subsequently, they learn that the music industry is hard to navigate as they sacrifice a lot to stay on top and relevant while they tour with the labels' other artist and find themselves at constant war with each other take 3 end up getting really big.

== Cast and characters ==
=== Main ===
- Jude Demorest as Star Davis:

A tough 18-year-old who spent her childhood in and out of foster homes after the death of her mother Mary. Wanting to pursue a career in music, she forms a girl group, Take 3 (formerly Big Trouble), with her half-sister Simone and friend Alex whom she met online. Though she has a lot of talent, her egotistical nature tends to bother others. At the start of the third season, she is pursuing a career as a solo artist, and dealing with the consequences of an unexpected pregnancy. In the third season mid-finale, Star gave birth to a son named Davis.

- Brittany O'Grady as Simone Davis-Rivera:

Star's biracial 17-year-old half-sister. She is rescued by Star from the abusive foster home in which she was placed five years before. While supportive of her sister's ambitions, Simone has dreams of her own, and will do whatever it takes to achieve them. In Season 2, she ends up in state custody for abusing marijuana. She is then liberated from juvie by Ayanna and ends up marrying Angel in a bid to avoid being recommitted. When he is deported to the Dominican Republic, she leaves Atlanta to be with him.

- Ryan Destiny as Alexandra "Alex" Crane Jones:

A wealthy 21-year-old who grew up in New York and is Star's best friend. She is looking to step out of the shadows of her famous father and make it on her own and becomes increasingly involved in political advocacy through her boyfriend Derek. However, she struggles to escape her toxic relationship with her parents, especially her alcoholic mother Rose. This leads her to slowly separate herself from the other girls in order to make a name outside of Take 3, while also dealing with the psychological aftereffects of surviving a plane crash. She and Derek later marry in the season 3 finale.

- Amiyah Scott as Cotton Brown:

Carlotta's transgender daughter. She works at her mother's salon and helps the girls kickstart their career. She also has a troubled relationship with Carlotta, as the latter has not accepted her daughter's transition, and is not understanding or fully supportive of the difficulties she faces as a trans woman, although she slowly comes around. After stealing money from her boyfriend Elliot, Cotton is sent to prison, but eventually gets released. She now works with Miss Bruce to manage her mother's salon.

- Quincy Brown as Derek Jones:

Alex's husband who lives next door to the girls. He is a civil rights activist affiliated with the Black Lives Matter movement and is committed to civil disobedience. After a car accident leaves him paralyzed from the waist down, their relationship becomes strained. Derek and Alex break up after she cheats on him with Noah Brooks. He then pursues a relationship with his physical therapist. However, Derek and Alex eventually get back together and marry in the season 3 finale.

- Benjamin Bratt as Jahil Rivera (seasons 1–2; guest season 3):

A talent manager who believes Take 3 is his ticket back to the top. However, he is hobbled by both a cocaine addiction and money problems. In Season 2, it is revealed that he faked his death with the help of Carlotta to avoid being framed for Hunter's murder. He ends up forming a new duo with his nephew Angel to compete with Take 3. In the mid-season 2 finale, Angel fires him as manager and he goes on a drug-fueled bender before briefly slipping into a coma. He is later shot in a drive-by shooting while shielding Andy and dies in season 2.

- Queen Latifah as Carlotta Renee Brown:

The owner of an Atlanta beauty salon, who worked with Mary Davis in the R&B duo, Mixed Harmony back in the 1990s. She becomes a surrogate mother to the three girls, even though she doesn't approve of their musical dreams. At the end of Season 1, she takes over as manager from Jahil. Her attempts to make Take 3 a success prove largely ineffective as the girls struggle with their own problems, and in the mid-season 2 finale, her salon is burned down. In the episode "Mrs. Rivera," it is revealed that Carlotta and Jahil were secretly married. She is eventually promoted to a senior position within Midtown by Ayanna, and eventually gets named as head of newly formed Gravity Records by Mateo.

- Miss Lawrence as Miss Bruce (seasons 2–3; recurring season 1):

A gay and genderfluid hairdresser who works at Carlotta's salon, taking over as owner when Carlotta commits to managing Take 3.

- Luke James as Noah Brooks (seasons 2–3):

A formerly top-selling R&B artist at Midtown Sound looking to make a much-needed comeback after his career collapsed due to alcoholism. He is a charming, sweet talker with an ambitious streak, and strikes up a relationship with Alex, Star and Gigi, at first for promotion, but it gradually evolves into an affair. By the third season, he seems to have largely conquered his addictions after a suicide attempt and is working to take more control over his career. In the mid-season finale, it is revealed he is the father of Star's baby son, Davis.

- Michael Michele as Ayanna Floyd (season 2):

The unsympathetic president and CEO of Midtown Sound, the record label that signed Take 3. She forms a maternal bond with Simone, even becoming her legal guardian, but also enables her to maintain her addiction to prescription drugs. At the mid-season 2 finale, she is disgraced and removed as president of Midtown after being caught trying to buy the label out from under her father. She is later restored to her former position after getting him fired for sexual harassment of a Midtown artist. However, she then becomes pregnant with Jahil's child, and decides to sell Midtown to Mateo Ferrara.

- Stephen Dorff as Brody Dean (season 2):

Star's long lost biological father who re-emerges as the girls get their first taste of fame but turns out to have an agenda concerning Hunter's death. Upon discovering the abuse Hunter inflicted on Star, however, he leaves town after murdering Hunter's mother, Arlene. He is electrocuted to death by Arlene's twin sister, Charlene in revenge.

- Lance Gross as Maurice Jetter (season 3; recurring season 2):

A&R at Midtown Records. He helps Carlotta navigate the treacherous currents of the company and his boss, Ayanna, but their relationship is destroyed when she catches him kissing his old girlfriend, Natalie. Maurice then sets his sights on persuading Star to leave Take 3 for a shot at a solo career. He later leaves Midtown when Ayanna sells the company and launches his own label with Cassie.

- Matthew Noszka as Jackson Ellis (season 3; recurring season 2):

An aspiring musician who became involved romantically with Star. It was originally believed that he was the father of her baby, but later turned out to be Noah.

- Brandy as Cassandra Augustine "Cassie" Brown (season 3; recurring season 2):

Carlotta's younger sister, who is deeply involved in organized crime. She and Andy strike up a relationship, but after he steals money from her, she tries to have him murdered, only to kill Jahil by accident. Andy later reveals her involvement to Carlotta out of guilt after accidentally shooting Ayanna while trying to forge a check in her name. After arguing with Carlotta, Cassie forms a partnership with Maurice to start their own competing label.

- William Levy as Mateo Ferrera (season 3):

A wealthy Miami media mogul who buys Midtown Sound from Ayanna and renames it Gravity Media, with plans to shut down the company's music division and turn it into a fashion-and-gossip brand.

=== Recurring ===
- Evan Ross as Angel Rivera, Jahil's nephew who helps him record new music. In turn, Jahil gets him to form a singing duo with Andy. After realizing that his uncle is more concerned with his interests than theirs, however, he fires him as their manager. He then learns that his father, Jahil's brother, is not his biological dad, and that he is an undocumented immigrant. After his attempt to get DACA protection is denied, he is arrested at Jahil's funeral and sentenced to deportation. He marries Simone in season 2 to prevent her from going back to juvie and falls in love with her. (seasons 2-3)
- Caroline Vreeland as Mary Davis, Star and Simone's mother who died of a drug overdose, which turns out to have been partially caused by Star. Mary was a member of the R&B duo Mixed Harmony with Carlotta in the 1990s.
- Juanita Jennings as Ruby Jones, Derek's grandmother and Carlotta's neighbor who hates Star and eventually comes around. She is later killed in the Season 3 finale.
- Naomi Campbell as Rose Spencer-Crane, Alexandra's mother, who struggles with alcoholism and a failed marriage with Alex's father Roland. (seasons 1-2)
- Nealla Gordon as Arlene Morgan, Hunter's mother (seasons 1-2), and Charlene (seasons 2-3). She didn't approve of Hunter's relationship with Star and blames Star for her son's death. After failing to get a police investigation, she starts blackmailing Star's father Brody to spy on his daughter. However, he stabs her to death after learning about Hunter's abuse. In season 2, Gordon also played Charlene, Arlene's twin sister who later tries to get revenge on Star for her father killing Arlene.
- Jack J. Yang as Elliot Wu, Cotton's boyfriend. He abandons her when she refuses to give up prostitution, and she steals money from him for her surgery. After her release from prison, however, he gives her a secretarial job at his construction firm. He dies after being severely beaten by Cotton's former cellmate, Omari. (seasons 1–2)
- Paris Jackson as Rachel Wallace, a social media expert hired by Jahil to promote Take 3. In Season 2, she becomes a consultant for Midtown Records, but leaves after Ayanna is fired. (seasons 1–2)
- Darius McCrary as Otis Leecan, Simone's abusive foster father. He is stabbed by Star when he tries to rape Simone, which he had been doing since she was in his custody. (season 1; guest season 2)
- Chad James Buchanan as Hunter Morgan, Star's ex-boyfriend, who was physically abusive towards her. He is Jahil's godson and a young NFL star but has secretly been using banned substances to prolong his career. He is killed along with Eva, when a hitman mistakes him for Jahil. (season 1)
- Tyrese Gibson as Pastor Bobby Harris, Carlotta's ex-boyfriend. He does not accept her transgender daughter Cotton as a woman, and Carlotta eventually breaks up with him. (season 1)
- Jasmine Burke as Danielle Jackson, a worker in Carlotta's shop and Gladys Knight's niece. She is shot and killed by police during a traffic stop after they assume she has a gun. (season 1)
- Sharlene Taulé as Eva, a Dominican girl whom Jahil saves from a trafficking ring. He later discovers that she is an amateur singer and has plans to take Star's place in his girl group. She and Hunter are killed on the season finale when a hitman mistakes Hunter for Jahil. (season 1)
- Joseline Hernandez as Michelle, a stripper at the Magic City strip club and one of Jahil's lovers. She becomes Cotton's roommate halfway through the first season. However, she ends up betraying Cotton by stealing her money and fleeing Atlanta. (season 1)
- Elijah Kelley as Andy, an aspiring singer who is an assistant to Ayanna Floyd. Jahil taps him to form a duo with his nephew, Angel, then dies while trying to protect Andy from hitmen sent by Cassie. Trying to escape from numerous attempts of being killed, he meets his demise from the thug ringleader Cassie, who eventually freed him to never return to the city again, but gets struck by a car after being chase by more hitmen and makes it to Carlotta's house where he dies from his injuries (seasons 2-3)
- Keke Palmer as Gigi Nixon, a famous, but hotheaded singer with a rough attitude who lands at Midtown Sound after befriending Alex and encourages her romance with Noah. Ayanna and Carlotta later learn that Ayanna's father Charles sexually abused Gigi during the early years of her career and use that information to force him out of Midtown. (seasons 2-3)
- Imani Lewis as Karen Williams, a juvie teen and troubled friend of Simone. After her friend commits suicide, the two start a relationship, but Karen is soon transferred to a new facility after breaking curfew. During the mid-season 2 finale, she tracks down Simone, who vows to take care of her and lets her stay in Carlotta's salon. She is killed in the salon fire. (season 2)
- Justin Marcel McManus as Omari, Cotton's former cellmate and lover. He protected Cotton from transphobic inmates during her prison sentence. After getting an early release, he tries to force his way back into Cotton's life. When she breaks off their relationship for Elliot, he violently kills him and seemingly drowns Cotton in her bathtub. After Cotton survives, her aunt Cassie arranges a hit on Omari, but Cotton chooses to spare his life so long as he agrees never to return to Atlanta. (season 2)
- Richard Roundtree as Charles Floyd, a legendary music label executive and Ayanna's father. He has a low opinion of his daughter's business acumen and threatens to sell the label if she is unable to make it profitable. In the mid-season 2 finale, he receives photos from Jahil implying that Ayanna orchestrated Midtown's financial troubles in order to buy it out with one of his business rivals. Enraged by her disloyalty, he fires her as president and disowns her. In turn, Ayanna uses evidence of sexual harassment to get him fired from his own company. (season 2)
- Camila Banus as Nina Ferrera, Mateo's wife and the head of acquisitions for Gravity Media. She is in an open marriage with Mateo. (season 3)
- Chad Michael Murray as Xander McPherson, a hustler and Cassie's lover, who provides the money to fund her label despite Carlotta's misgivings. (season 3)
- Terrence J as Ryan French (season 3)
- Lyndie Greenwood as Megan Jetter, Maurice's ex-wife. (season 3)
- Kayla Brianna (credited as Kayla Smith) as Olivia, the alleged sister of Bianca, a girl who was killed in the plane crash that Alex survived and is taken in out of guilt over her sister's death. She grows an obsession over Alex and Derek's relationship but more muses over Alex's fame. However, she enters the newfound friendship with a sneaky motive to perhaps seek some sort of revenge for fame by using Alex after finding out that her sister wasn't saved on the crash because of the priority of Alex's celebrity to be rescued over the other injured passengers, it's later revealed on a phone call with Bianca's mother that Olivia is not related to her and is extremely dangerous. (season 3)
- Harold Perrineau as Bobby Brooks, Noah's estranged father who tries to reconnect with his son while also encouraging him to improve his music. (season 3)
- Marcos "Kosine" Palocios as Lil' Dini, an over-confident 'cocky' rap artist on Gravity Media whose personality is over the top as he bullies fellow artists on the label. (season 3)

=== Guest stars ===
- Lenny Kravitz as Roland Crane, a legendary rock star and Alexandra's father. (season 1)
- Missy Elliott as Pumpkin, a legendary rapper hired by Hunter to help Star with her block party. In episode 10 of the first season, she helps Jahil produce a new song for Take 3. (season 1)
- Mike Epps as Jay Holland, the former label president of Midtown Sound, but was fired and replaced by Ayanna after Star slept with him to help further Take 3's career. (season 2)
- Jussie Smollett as Jamal Lyon, a member of the Lyon family, from New York, who co-owns a powerful record company in the music industry (Empire Entertainment), for which he also works as an artist. (season 2)
- Tasha Smith as Carol Holloway, Jamal Lyon's aunt and Cookie Lyon's younger sister. (season 2)
- Patti LaBelle as Christine Brown, Carlotta and Cassie's mother. (seasons 2–3)
- Teyana Taylor as Joyce Sheree, a popular singer who happens to be an old friend of Noah's. Star schemes to get Joyce on one of Take 3's songs after meeting her at a party, but Noah ends up snagging her for his song instead, sparking an argument between them. Joyce ends up overdosing on cough syrup while trying to destress, and winds up hospitalized. She is still addicted to alcohol while on tour with Noah & Star despite being ordered to get clean by Carlotta and gets dropped from the tour after threatening Star with a gun during a press conference. (seasons 2–3)
- Meagan Good as Natalie Knight, a promoter and Maurice's ex-girlfriend who helps set up a tour for Noah and Take 3. (seasons 2–3)
- Mike Furry as Mike-Mike, Miss Ruby's rapist. He is later killed by Ruby in retaliation for raping her.
- Draya Michele as Chloe David (season 3), a powerful social media influencer hired by Mateo to drum up publicity for his artists
- Ben Vereen as Calvin Brown (Season 3), Carlotta and Cassie's father who molested Carlotta when she was little.
- Kimberly Elise as Dianne Brooks, Noah's mother.
- Robert Crayton as Club Bouncer
- Rayven Symone Ferrell as Rachel, Simone’s foster sister and one of Otis’s biological daughters. (seasons 1–2)
- Additionally, Big Boi, Tiny, Gladys Knight, Porsha Williams, Kelly Price, Monica Brown, Quavo and Mimi Faust make appearances as themselves.

== Episodes ==
Season	Episodes	Originally released	
Season	Episodes	First released	Last released
1	12	December 14, 2016	March 15, 2017
2	18	September 27, 2017	May 23, 2018
3	18	September 26, 2018	May 8, 2019

== Production ==
=== Development and casting ===
In August 2015, Fox announced it had ordered a pilot for a potential new musical drama series titled Star from Empire-creator Lee Daniels about three girls forming a girl group. In October that same year, casting for the series began. It was revealed that the series would feature a transgender character. On December 7, 2015, it was announced that Queen Latifah had joined the cast as Carlotta, Jude Demorest as Star, Brittany O'Grady as Simone and Ryan Destiny as Alexandra and Amiyah Scott as Cotton. On December 11, 2015, it was confirmed that Benjamin Bratt has joined the cast as Jahil, a talent manager. On December 14, 2015, Darius McCrary joined the series as the abusive foster father of Simone (O’Grady). Production for the pilot began in December 2015. The series was picked up, with a 12-episode order, on April 27, 2016. On October 9, 2017, FOX ordered an additional five episodes for the second season, bringing the season total to 18 episodes. On September 11, 2018, it was announced that Terrence J and Lyndie Greenwood are set to recur in season 3.

=== Filming ===
On May 4, 2016, it was announced that Charles Murray would serve as showrunner during its first season. On September 13, 2016, it was announced that Charles Pratt Jr. would replace Murray as the series' showrunner, following his decision to depart the series, due to creative differences.

Following the conclusion of the show's first season, Pratt stepped down as showrunner and was subsequently replaced by Karin Gist.

=== Cancellation and possible revival ===
After the series was canceled by Fox in May 2019, fans began a #SAVESTAR campaign on social media platforms. Multiple petitions were created on websites such as change.org to save the show from cancellation, and these petitions have collectively gained over 100,000 signatures. On May 29, show creator Lee Daniels made an Instagram post saying "Fighting guys! Will know this week... or top of next!" The Hollywood Reporter reported that cable networks BET and OWN were possible contenders for picking up the show. However, on May 31, Daniels made another Instagram post stating that despite his efforts, he was not able to find another home for the show.

In July 2019, Lee Daniels posted on his Instagram account that Star will receive a proper finale through a two-hour movie event.

In February 2024, Lee Daniels responded to a lengthy viral social media post by Zoie Fenty, known popularly as @iamzoie, who expressed strong interests in the shows return due to the season finale being cut short without a resolve [quoting: "I NEED STAR BACK BECAUSE BAYYYYYY THE WAY I WAS INVESTED[.]” ]. Many other commenters expressed the same over the years and made many post about the untimely cancellation. Lee stated on his post: "Love you for this. It is being written. I appreciate everybody's love! It's just taken me FOREVER cause I have other projects…It's crazy, I had NO IDEA when I created this show the response would be like this. #grateful." Also in an Instagram post made by Daniels himself in March 2024 while explaining about the challenges of completing his upcoming 2024 supernatural horror film The Deliverance, he hinted once again at STAR potential return stating "...and then I gotta worry about STAR, I gotta put a writer's room together so I could keep y'all off my ass about STAR...it's crazy."

At the end of July 2024, during an Instagram live discussion with Sasha Alexander on her video log "#convosandcoffee" while promoting the film The Deliverance, he provided an update to STAR as many viewers flooded the comment section about the series, interrupting the interview. He expressed that he was amazed at the enormous response from people who stopped him at grocery stores who at times were verbally angry with him asking why was STAR cancelled. He acknowledged that is wasn't his doing to get the series axed, it was FOX studios as he had more plans for the series to grow mentioning "Just as I was getting into my mojo and groove, it gets cancelled". While he also felt, that he had thought EMPIRE was a 'big hit ticket' that seemed to be more popular, but didn't realize how STAR resonated with many viewers. Lee assured that it is still in the works as he has a writer working on it as of the present moment of the Instagram live. He stated it may come in the form as a pilot or one episode television movie, unless picked up by a network. He lastly confirmed "It is coming..so please relax!"

== Reception ==
=== Critical response ===
On Rotten Tomatoes, the first season holds a rating of 35%, with an average rating of 4.19 out of 10 based on 37 reviews. The website's critical consensus reads, "Despite Queen Latifah's strong performance, the cast, and the songs, Lee Daniels' Star is weighed down by sloppy melodrama and overly cartoonish stereotypes". On Metacritic, the series has a score of 42 out of 100, based on 30 critics, indicating "mixed or average reviews".

=== Ratings ===
Viewership and ratings per season of Star
Season	Timeslot (ET)	Episodes	First aired		Last aired		TV season	Viewership rank	Avg. viewers (millions)	18–49 rank
Season	Timeslot (ET)	Episodes	Date	Viewers (millions)	Date	Viewers (millions)	TV season	Viewership rank	Avg. viewers (millions)	18–49 rank
1	Wednesday 9:00 pm	12	December 14, 2016	6.71	March 15, 2017	3.95	2016–17	76	5.73	TBD
2	Wednesday 9:00 pm	18	September 27, 2017	5.40	May 23, 2018	3.95	2017–18	96	5.12	TBD
3	Wednesday 9:00 pm	18	September 26, 2018	4.64	May 8, 2019	3.43	2018–19	95	4.74	TBD

=== Awards and nominations ===
Year	Award	Category	Nominee	Result	Ref.
2017	19th Teen Choice Awards	Choice TV Show: Drama	Star	Nominated	
2017	19th Teen Choice Awards	Choice Breakout TV Star	Ryan Destiny	Nominated	
2018	29th GLAAD Media Awards	Outstanding Drama Series	Star	Nominated	
2018	20th Teen Choice Awards	Choice TV Show: Drama	Star	Nominated	
2018	20th Teen Choice Awards	Choice TV Actress: Drama	Ryan Destiny	Nominated	
2019	30th GLAAD Media Awards	Outstanding Drama Series	Star	Nominated	
