= Tom Donaghy =

American playwright

Tom Donaghy is an American playwright who works across television, film and journalism.

== Theater ==
Donaghy’s first play, Down the Shore, was produced by The Eugene O’Neill National Playwrights Conference. It then premiered at Goodman Theater before its Off-Broadway run at Atlantic Theater Company where it was paired with The Dadshuttle. His first full-length play, Northeast Local, had productions at Trinity Repertory and Seattle Repertory, before premiering at Lincoln Center Theater. Minutes from the Blue Route was produced by New York Stage and Film and then premiered at Atlantic. From Above and Boys and Girls were produced at Playwrights Horizons. The Beginning of August premiered at South Coast Repertory and then in New York at Atlantic. Eden Lane premiered at La Jolla Playhouse. Donaghy’s adaptation of Anton Chekhov’s The Cherry Orchard, based on a translation by Ronald Meyer, premiered at Atlantic.

Subsequent productions of the plays have been produced by the Arden Theatre Company, Philadelphia Theater Company, the Magic Theater, Dallas Theater Center and others.

== Published plays ==
Acting editions of the plays are published by Dramatist Play Service, and a collection, The Beginning of August and Other Plays, was published by Grove Press.

== Teaching ==
New York University’s Tisch School of the Arts. Lecture appearances at City University of New York, Columbia University, Dartmouth College, Temple University and The University of Pennsylvania.

== Recognition ==
Donaghy has been nominated for Obie, GLAAD and NAACP awards, and has received awards from the John Simon Guggenheim Memorial Foundation, the National Endowment for the Arts, Theater Communications Group, the Sloan Foundation, and PEN America. In addition, he has held residencies at MacDowell, the Millay Colony, and the Edward F. Albee Foundation. For his investigative piece "Who Killed the Fudge King?", published in The Atavist Magazine, he received an Excellence in Feature Writing Award from NLGJA: The Association of LGBTQ Journalists. His theater work has been profiled by The New York Times, The Los Angeles Times, the Village Voice and others.

== Film and television ==
With Jerry Bruckheimer Television and Warner Bros. Television, he created and produced The Whole Truth for ABC. He also co-created, with Lee Daniels, the musical drama STAR for Fox Broadcasting Company.
