= God's Pocket Marine Provincial Park =

Park in British Columbia, Canada

God's Pocket Provincial Park
- IUCN category II (national park)
- Location within Vancouver Island Location within British Columbia
- Interactive map of God's Pocket Provincial Park
- Location: Rupert Land District, British Columbia, Canada
- Nearest city: Port Hardy, BC
- Coordinates: 50°50′14″N 127°33′39″W
- Area: 2,036 ha (5,030 acres)
- Established: July 13, 1995
- Governing body: BC Parks

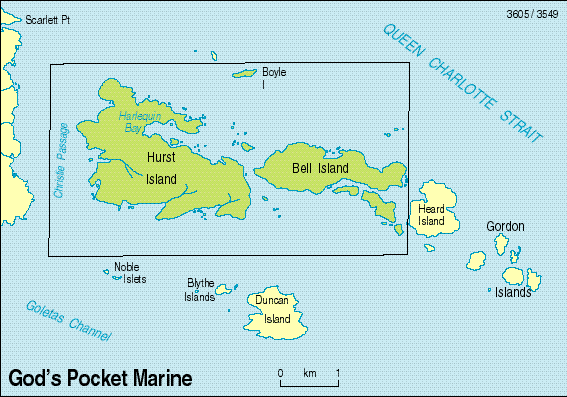
Map of God's Pocket

God's Pocket Marine Provincial Park is a provincial park in southwest British Columbia, Canada, established on July 12, 1995. It is well known as a cold water scuba diving and kayaking destination. The park is 2,036 hectares in size, and includes two main islands, Hurst and Bell, as well as many smaller isles.
