= Shadowboxer =

2005 film by Lee Daniels

- Theatrical release poster
- Directed by: Lee Daniels
- Written by: Will Rokos
- Produced by: Lee Daniels; Lisa Cortés; David Robinson; Brook Lenfest; Damon Dash; Marvet Britto
- Starring: Cuba Gooding Jr.; Helen Mirren; Vanessa Ferlito; Macy Gray; Joseph Gordon-Levitt; Mo'Nique; Stephen Dorff
- Cinematography: M. David Mullen
- Edited by: Brian A. Kates; William Chang
- Music by: Mario Grigorov
- Distributed by: Teton Films; Freestyle Releasing
- Release dates: September 9, 2005 (Toronto International Film Festival); July 21, 2006 (United States)
- Running time: 93 minutes
- Country: United States
- Language: English
- Box office: $519,802

Shadowboxer is a 2005 crime thriller film directed by Lee Daniels and starring Cuba Gooding Jr., Helen Mirren, Vanessa Ferlito, Macy Gray, Joseph Gordon-Levitt, Mo'Nique, and Stephen Dorff. It opened in limited release in six cities: New York, Los Angeles, Washington, D.C., Baltimore, Philadelphia, and Richmond, Virginia.

== Plot ==
Mikey and his stepmother Rose are contract killers and lovers. The two continue with their line of work even though Rose is suffering from cancer.

Organized crime kingpin Clayton suspects that his pregnant wife Vicki may have been unfaithful, so he hires Mikey and Rose to kill her. Upon entering Clayton's mansion, Rose heads for Vicki's bedroom while Vicki is on the phone with her best friend Neisha. But as Rose enters Vicki's bedroom, Vicki's water breaks and she goes into labor. Taking pity on Vicki, Rose uses her prior medical training to deliver Vicki's baby, a boy she later names Anthony. Afterward, Mikey and Rose drive Vicki and her infant son to a local motel.

On Rose's request, Mikey calls Dr. Don, Clayton's private doctor. Dr. Don arrives with his drug-addicted nurse/lover, Precious. Dr. Don provides medical assistance to Vicki and her baby before leaving. Over Mikey's objections, Rose insists that they take Vicki and her infant son to a safe place. The four end up in Philadelphia.

Meanwhile, Neisha arrives at Clayton's mansion, demanding to know where Vicki is. Clayton becomes nervous that Neisha knows too much and pays Mikey to kill her, which he does by poisoning. Mikey and Rose then move Vicki and her son to a house in upstate Pennsylvania. Mikey carries on with the contract killings alone as Rose has become too ill to accompany him.

At the baby's first birthday party, Rose decides she would rather die than suffer from cancer. She and Mikey have sex in the woods, and she has Mikey shoot her as she reaches orgasm. Before she dies, Rose makes Mikey promise to protect Vicki and her baby. Mikey, Vicki, and Anthony live safely for seven years.

Sometime later, Precious discovers Dr. Don performing oral sex on a patient. Hurt and betrayed, Precious leaves his office while threatening to get her revenge.

Vicki becomes concerned about Anthony when she sees him watching Mikey assemble a gun. She later asks Mikey to leave, saying that he does not have to protect them anymore. Mikey realizes that he has grown attached to Anthony and tells Vicki that he wants to stay.

Clayton finds out from Precious that Vicki and Anthony are alive. Clayton kills Precious in front of Dr. Don and then shoots him in the leg. Mikey, deciding that he no longer wants to kill, determines that his next contract kill will be his final. When Mikey checks into a hotel he opens the file on his contract, only to find a picture of himself and Vicki leaving their house. Mikey then calls Vicki. Clayton's bodyguard instead answers the phone, causing Mikey to rush home and right into Clayton's trap.

Clayton tortures Mikey in the basement, in part by snipping off one of his fingers with a pair of hedge clippers. Vicki and Anthony are forced to watch. Clayton then turns around to taunt Vicki. At that moment, Mikey disarms the thug who held him down during the finger-snipping. During the ensuing struggle, Mikey manages to overpower Clayton and the remaining thug. Clayton recovers and is about to shoot Mikey when Anthony shoots Clayton in the back. After sending Vicki and Anthony outside, Mikey kills Clayton's two unconscious thugs. Mikey then does the same to Clayton after commenting to him just how proud Anthony Clayton probably is.

Mikey, Vicki, and Anthony escape. Anthony asks Mikey if he is his son, and Mikey replies he is. Mikey also cautions Anthony to watch out for people like Clayton and his men; the boy responds, "We'll kill 'em."

== Cast ==
- Cuba Gooding Jr. as Mikey
- Helen Mirren as Rose
- Vanessa Ferlito as Vicki
- Stephen Dorff as Clayton Mayfield
- Macy Gray as Neisha
- Joseph Gordon-Levitt as Dr. Don
- Mo'Nique as Precious
- Angel Oquendo as Lamar
- Shaun Brewington as Little Mikey
- Tom Pasch as Andrew

== Reception ==
Shadowboxer received negative reviews from critics. On Rotten Tomatoes, it holds an approval rating of 17%, based on 58 reviews, with an average score of 3.92/10. The website's critics consensus reads: "With random characters and a preposterous plot, this bizarre thriller might leave you with your mouth hanging open in disbelief."
