= Pete Dexter =

American writer

- Born: July 22, 1943 (age 83); Pontiac, Michigan, U.S.
- Education: University of South Dakota
- Occupations: Novelist, screenwriter
- Writing career
- Genre: Fiction

Pete Dexter (born July 22, 1943) is an American novelist. He won the U.S. National Book Award in 1988 for his novel Paris Trout.

== Early life and education ==
Dexter was born in Pontiac, Michigan. His father died when Dexter was four and he and his mother moved to Milledgeville, Georgia, where she married a college physics professor. He earned his undergraduate degree in 1969 from the University of South Dakota, which awarded him an honorary Doctor of Letters and Literature in 2010.

== Career ==
He worked for what is now The Palm Beach Post in West Palm Beach, Florida, but quit in 1972 because the paper's owners forced the editorial page editor to endorse Richard Nixon over George McGovern. He was a columnist for the Philadelphia Daily News, from 1974 to 1986, The Sacramento Bee, and syndicated to many newspapers such as the Seattle Post-Intelligencer.

Dexter began writing fiction after a life-changing 1981 incident in the Devil's Pocket, neighborhood in South Philadelphia, in which a mob of locals armed with baseball bats beat him severely. The perpetrators were upset by Dexter's recent column about a murder involving a drug deal-gone-wrong, published on December 9, 1981, in the Philadelphia Daily News,

A couple of weeks ago, a kid named Buddy Lego was found dead in Cobbs Creek," wrote Dexter. "It was a Sunday afternoon. He was from the neighborhood, a good athlete, a nice kid. Stoned all the time. The kind of kid you think you could have saved.

The kid's mother called Dexter, nearly hysterical. How, she cried, could he write that her dead son was a drug user? Lego's brother, Tommy, the night bartender at Dougherty's, was also on the phone, screaming at the then-38-year-old columnist, demanding a retraction.

Dexter went to Dougherty's bar to talk to Tommy Lego, having told Lego he would not be publishing a retraction. In the bar, Dexter was blindsided by two blows to the jaw, splintering and breaking teeth. Later, Dexter returned with a friend, heavyweight prizefighter Randall "Tex" Cobb. In the ensuing fight outside the bar in the street, Cobb's arm was broken and Dexter was hospitalized with several injuries, including a broken back, pelvis, brain damage and dental devastation. Cobb's injuries cost him a shot at WBA heavyweight champion Mike Weaver. The assault and its aftermath are mirrored by events that occur in Dexter's 2009 novel, Spooner.

Paper Trails, published in 2007, is a compilation of columns he wrote for the Philadelphia Daily News and The Sacramento Bee from the 1970s to the 1990s.

== Personal life ==
For many years, Dexter lived and wrote on Whidbey Island in Puget Sound. Dexter holds a position as Writer in Residence in the creative writing program at the University of South Dakota. He lives in Vermillion, South Dakota, near the university.

== Works ==
=== Novels ===
- God's Pocket (1983) – adapted as the 2014 film God's Pocket
- Deadwood (1986) – influenced the 1995 film Wild Bill
- Paris Trout (1988) — winner of the National Book Award for Fiction
- Brotherly Love (1991)
- The Paperboy (1995) — 1996 Literary Award, PEN Center USA
- Train (2003)
- Spooner (2009)

=== Nonfiction ===
- Paper Trails (2007)

=== Screenplays ===
- Paris Trout (1991)
- Rush (1991)
- Michael (1996)
- Mulholland Falls (1996)
- The Paperboy (2012)
