= The Paperboy (novel) =

1995 novel by Pete Dexter

- First edition
- Author: Pete Dexter
- Language: English
- Genre: Novel
- Publisher: Random House
- Publication date: 1995
- Publication place: United States
- Media type: Print (hardback & paperback)
- ISBN: 0-385-31572-4

The Paperboy is a 1995 novel published by American author Pete Dexter.

== Plot ==
Hillary Van Wetter was jailed for the murder of an unscrupulous local sheriff, Thurmond Call. Call had previously stomped Wetter's handcuffed cousin to death. Wetter is now on death row and awaiting execution. In prison Wetter receives correspondence from Charlotte Bless, a woman he has never met but who has fallen in love with him and is determined that he should be released and that they should marry.

Bless provokes immense sexual tension in any situation, given her beauty and presence. Bless attempts to prove Wetter's innocence by enlisting the support of two investigative reporters from a Miami newspaper hungry for a salacious story: the ambitious Yardley Acheman and the naive, idealistic Ward James, heir to the newspaper's publisher.

The evidence against Wetter is inconsistent and the writers are confident that if they can expose Wetter as a victim of redneck justice then their story will be a potential Pulitzer Prize winner. However the journalists embellish the facts and play up certain aspects of the story while downplaying others, and Yardley sleeps with Charlotte. With the newspapermen's support, Wetter is released from prison and the pair win the Pulitzer Prize. It soon becomes apparent that the writers underestimated Wetter. After marrying Charlotte, Wetter murders her. Consumed by guilt, Ward commits suicide.

== Reception ==
The New York Times described the work as an "eerie and beautiful novel". The reviewer added that "the pacing works to the novel's advantage, forcing us to linger in its eerie emotional straits." Entertainment Weekly gave the novel a B+, describing it as "a wise and fascinating tale well told". The novel was also awarded the PEN Center USA literary award for fiction in 1996.

== Film adaptation ==
Screen adaptation plans have been going on for over ten years between Dexter and Spanish director Pedro Almodóvar. Millennium Films picked up US distribution rights to the film at the 2011 Cannes Film Festival. Lee Daniels stepped in as director and the project began in summer 2011. Matthew McConaughey and Zac Efron star in the film, with Oscar winner Nicole Kidman taking on the role of Charlotte. The film was shown at the 2012 festival at Cannes.
