= Lee Daniels =

American filmmaker (born 1959)

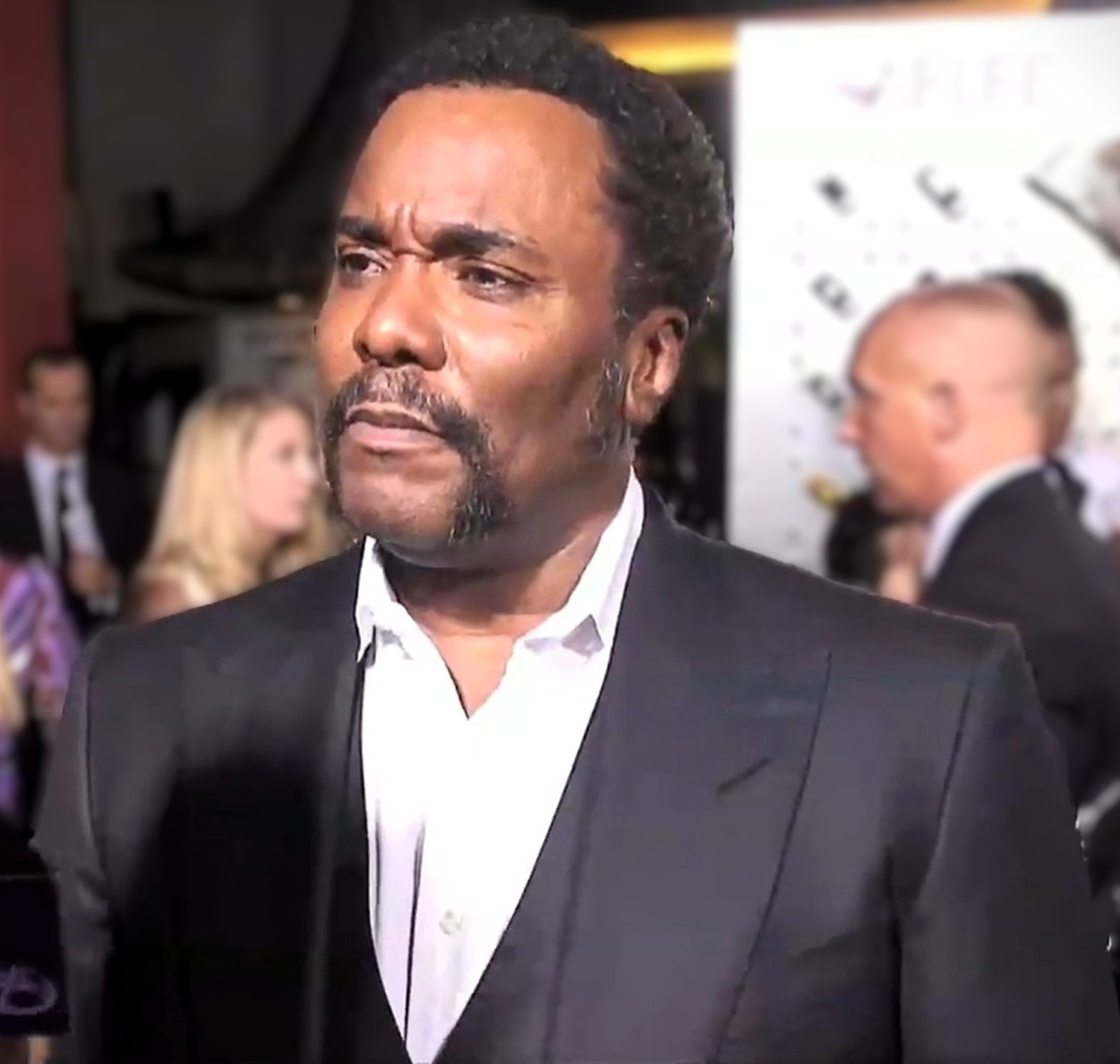
- Daniels in 2009
- Born: Lee Louis Daniels; December 24, 1959 (age 66); Philadelphia, Pennsylvania, U.S.
- Education: Radnor High School; Lindenwood University
- Occupations: Film and television producer, director, screenwriter
- Years active: 1986–present
- Partner: Billy Hopkins (1993–2009)
- Children: 2
- Relatives: Honey Davenport (cousin)
- Website: leedanielsentertainment.com

Lee Louis Daniels (born December 24, 1959) is an American filmmaker. He made his directorial film debut with Shadowboxer (2005), followed by Precious (2009) which earned him Academy Award nominations for Best Director and Best Picture. He has since directed The Paperboy (2012, which he co-wrote), The Butler (2013), The United States vs. Billie Holiday (2021), and The Deliverance (2024). He also produced the films Monster's Ball (2001), The Woodsman (2004), Tennessee (2008), Pimp (2018), and Concrete Cowboy (2020).

Daniels has co-created and co-executive produced the TV series Empire (2015–2020) and Star (2016–2019), both set in the music industry.

== Early life ==
Daniels was born on December 24, 1959, in West Philadelphia, the eldest son of Clara May (Watson) and William Louis Daniels. Daniels has four siblings: Cheryl, Lydia (aka Girlie), Maynard and Leah. His younger sister, Leah Daniels-Butler, is a television and film casting director credited with casting many of his projects. When Daniels was a teenager, his mother arranged for a neighbor's family who was a butler for the owner of the Philadelphia Flyers hockey team to use that owner's address in Radnor so that Lee could attend the public Radnor High School. In 1975, when Daniels was 15 years old, his father, who was a police officer, was killed in the line of duty. He graduated from Radnor High School in 1978.

After graduating from Radnor, Daniels attended Lindenwood University in St. Charles, Missouri. However, he soon realized the liberal arts school was not for him, and he moved to Hollywood, Los Angeles, eventually working as a receptionist in a nursing agency. Before long, Daniels started his own nursing agency, specializing in HIV/AIDS treatment. Eventually, he sold his nursing agency and segued into casting. He began his career in entertainment as a casting director and manager after a chance meeting with a Hollywood producer, working on such projects as Purple Rain and Under the Cherry Moon. He continued managing talent. The documentary My Big Break features Daniels early in his career when he was managing actor Wes Bentley, who starred as Ricky Fitts in American Beauty. In the documentary, Daniels comments on Bentley's reluctance to capitalize on his newfound celebrity status.

== Career ==
=== 2001–2008: Early films and directorial debut ===
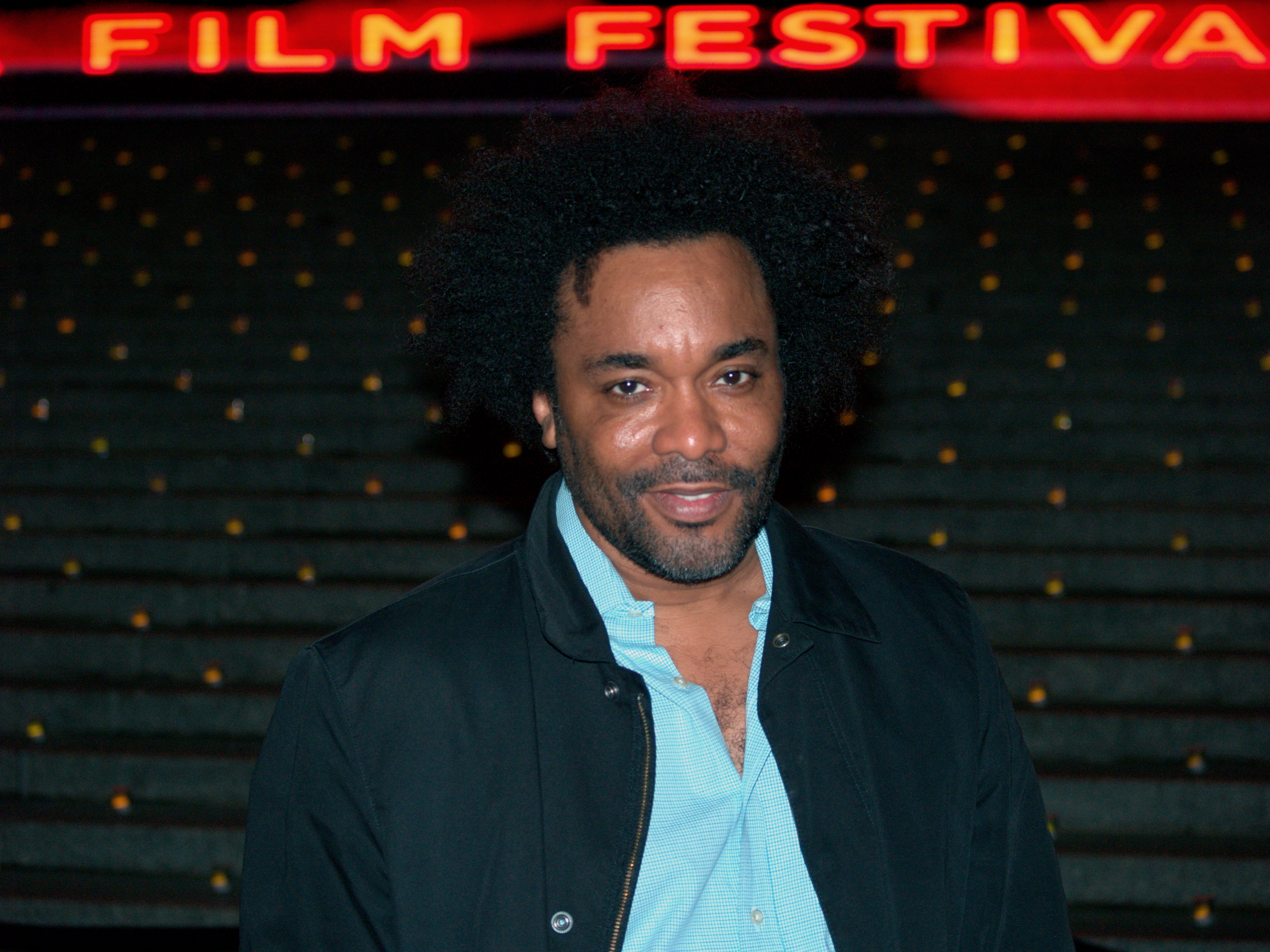
Daniels at the 2009 Tribeca Film Festival

Monster's Ball, the debut production of Lee Daniels Entertainment, was a critical and box office success. Halle Berry won the Academy Award for Best Actress; the film was also nominated for Best Original Screenplay. This made Daniels the first African-American film producer to solely produce an Oscar-winning film. Daniels said he did not attend the Oscars when the film won, citing his challenges with addiction and his struggle over whether he "deserved" to attend, according to an emotional interview on MSNBC in 2019. He served as one of the producers of the 2004 film The Woodsman, starring Kevin Bacon, Kyra Sedgwick, and Mos Def, premiered at the Sundance Film Festival. It went on to garner three nominations at the 2005 Independent Spirit Awards, the CICAE Arthouse Prize at the Cannes Film Festival, the Jury Prize at the Deauville American Film Festival, and a "Special Mention for Excellence in Filmmaking" award from the National Board of Review. Former president Bill Clinton persuaded Daniels to produce public service announcements to encourage young people of color to vote. The campaign was launched in March 2004 and featured Grammy winners LL Cool J and Alicia Keys.

His first directorial effort, 2006's Shadowboxer, debuted at the Toronto International Film Festival. It starred Helen Mirren, Cuba Gooding Jr., Stephen Dorff, Vanessa Ferlito, Mo'Nique, Joseph Gordon-Levitt, and Macy Gray. It was nominated for Best New Director at the San Sebastian Film Festival. He produced the 2008 film Tennessee, which was written by Russell Schaumberg and directed by Aaron Woodley (Rhinoceros Eyes); the film is about two brothers, played by Adam Rothenberg and Ethan Peck, who travel from New Mexico to Tennessee to search for their estranged father. Along the way they meet Krystal (Mariah Carey), an aspiring singer who flees her controlling husband (Lance Reddick) to join them on their journey.

=== 2009–2014: Precious and other work ===
His 2009 film Precious told the story of an obese, illiterate, 16-year-old girl (Gabourey Sidibe) who lives in a Section 8 tenement in Harlem. She has been impregnated twice by her father, Carl, and suffers long-term physical, sexual, and emotional abuse from her unemployed mother, Mary (Mo'Nique). Carey appeared as a social worker. The film screened at the 2009 Sundance Film Festival and went on to garner widespread acclaim. Mo'Nique won the Academy Award for Best Supporting Actress, Daniels was nominated for the Academy Award for Best Director and the film received a Best Picture nomination. It was a financial success grossing $63 million worldwide against a budget of $10 million.

Daniels directed The Paperboy (2012), based on the 1995 novel by Pete Dexter who penned the original script which was further developed by Daniels; it starred Matthew McConaughey, Zac Efron, John Cusack, and Nicole Kidman. The film competed for the Palme d'Or at the 2012 Cannes Film Festival. He directed the historical drama film The Butler (2013), starring Forest Whitaker, John Cusack, Jane Fonda, Mariah Carey, Terrence Howard, Alan Rickman, and Oprah Winfrey. The Butler received mixed reviews from critics and grossed over $100 million in the United States against a budget of $30 million.

=== 2015–present: Empire and streaming films ===
Empire, a television series created by Daniels, premiered on January 7, 2015. Daniels directed the first episode and co-wrote it with The Butler screenwriter Danny Strong. The series stars Terrence Howard and Taraji P. Henson, and is about a family's music empire. In May 2021, Daniels and his production company Lee Daniels Entertainment had extended its overall deal with 20th Television.

In January 2022, Netflix won a bidding war for an exorcism styled horror thriller film directed by Daniels for upwards of 65 million dollars. In April 2022, it was announced that Tasha Smith will star in the film. In April 2022, it was announced that Daniels will develop and direct a limited series based on Sammy Davis Jr. for 20th Television and Hulu, with Elijah Kelley starring as Davis.

== Activism and recognition ==
In 2010, Grace Hightower De Niro, who appeared in Precious, presented Daniels with the Pratt Institute's Creative Spirit Award. In 2015, Daniels was listed as one of the nine runners-up for The Advocate's Person of the Year. On December 2, 2016, Daniels received a star on the Hollywood Walk of Fame for his contributions to the television industry. In June 2016, the Human Rights Campaign released a video in tribute to the victims of the Orlando nightclub shooting; in the video, Daniels and others told the stories of the people killed there.

On February 8, 2018, amfAR (The Foundation for AIDS Research) paid tribute to Daniels at the 20th annual amfAR Gala New York. Actress and musician Queen Latifah presented him the amfAR Award of Courage, describing his past work with HIV/AIDS patients. She also stated that as a gifted creative force, he creates "unfailingly human" characters, who are "often striving to rise above difficult circumstances". In his acceptance speech, he spoke about a generation lost to AIDS and said that the crisis had taken at least 40 of his personal friends. In the fight against AIDS, he said it is important to "step up when it matters".

== Controversy ==
On September 16, 2015, in a Rolling Stone interview, Daniels was asked about actor Terrence Howard who said that his first wife "was talking to him real strong, that he lost his mind and slapped her in front of their kids" and that he got physical with his second wife too. Daniels excused the domestic violence and called Howard a "poor boy", saying that Howard "ain't done nothing different than Marlon Brando or Sean Penn". A week later, Daniels was sued by Penn in a $10-million-dollar defamation lawsuit. The lawsuit stated that "Daniels falsely equated Penn with Howard and that Penn, unlike Howard, had never been arrested, much less convicted, for domestic violence, as his ex-wives, including Madonna, would have confirmed and attested." Penn dropped the lawsuit in May 2016 after Daniels retracted his statement and apologized.

== Personal life ==
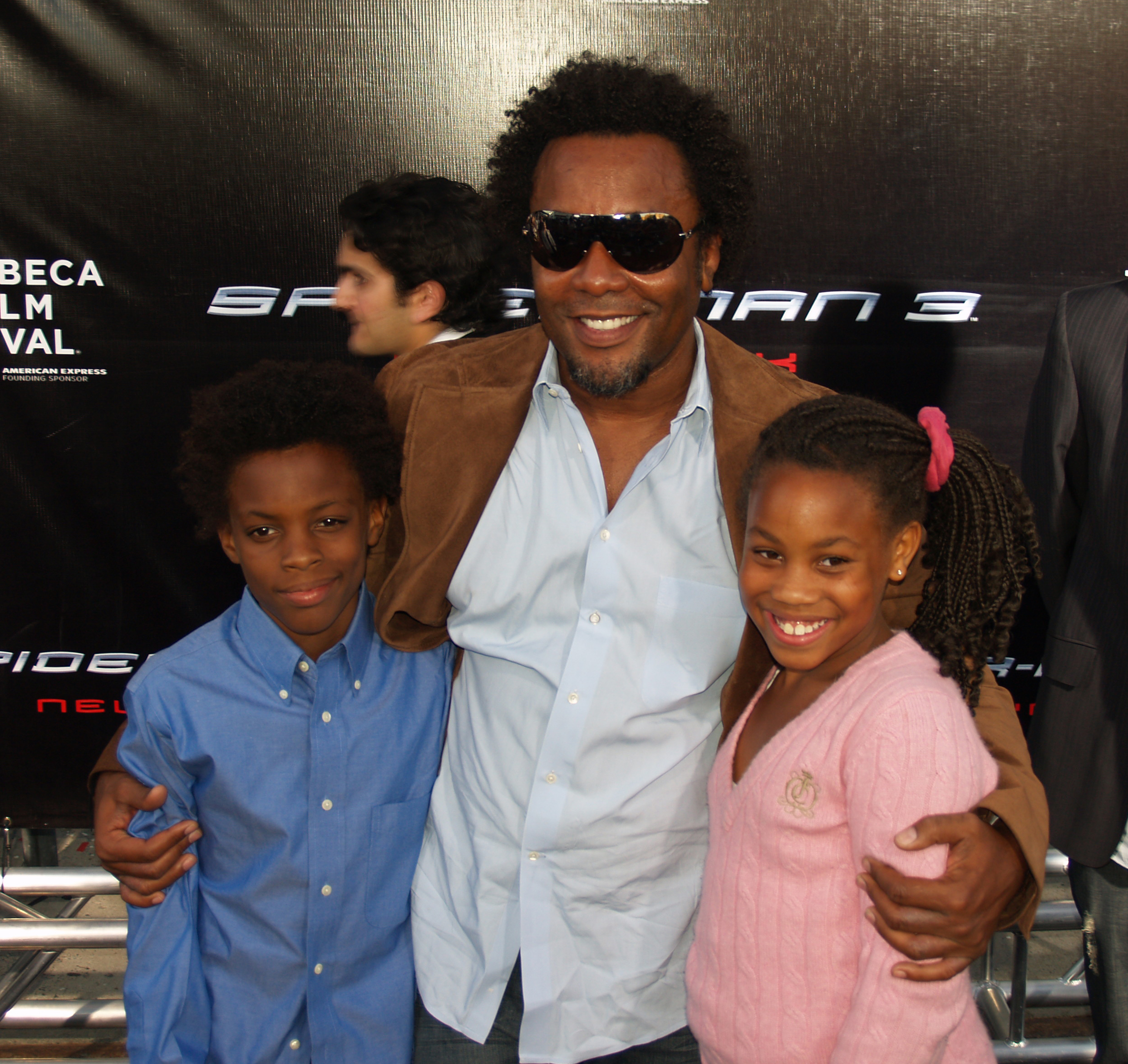
Daniels with his son and daughter at the 2007 world premiere of Spider-Man 3

Daniels lives in Manhattan. He is gay. He and his then-partner, casting director Billy Hopkins, adopted Daniels' biological niece and nephew, Clara and Liam.

Hopkins and Daniels later separated.

In 2015, Daniels clarified his sexuality by stating that despite identifying as gay men, both he and Empire actor Jussie Smollett are sexually fluid.

Jussie and I both share the same feeling that, yes, even though we are gay, we're sexual human beings...And we do occasionally want to sleep with a woman. [Laughs] Maybe once every 10 or 15 years, but it happens! And there are a lot of people who don't want to hear about that. It's such a complicated conversation. It's not necessarily the body one is attracted to. You can be sexually attracted to the spirit, the energy, the life force in another person. We're showing life on Empire, and I won't apologize for it.

== Filmography ==
=== Film ===
Year	Title	Director	Producer	Writer
2001	Monster's Ball	No	Yes	No
2004	The Woodsman	No	Yes	No
2005	Shadowboxer	Yes	Yes	No
2008	Tennessee	No	Yes	No
2009	Precious	Yes	Yes	No
2012	The Paperboy	Yes	Yes	Yes
2013	The Butler	Yes	Yes	No
2020	Concrete Cowboy	No	Yes	No
2021	The United States vs. Billie Holiday	Yes	Yes	No
2024	The Deliverance	Yes	Yes	No

Executive producer

- Pimp (2018)
- The Reading (2023)

Acting roles

Year	Title	Role	Notes
1991	A Little Off Mark	Steve, Mark's best friend	Short film
2004	Agnes und seine Brüder	Henry Preminger	
2005	Shadowboxer	Man in Steam Room	
2012	The Paperboy	Bartender	Uncredited

=== Television ===
Year	Title	Director	Writer	Executive Producer	Creator	Notes
2015–2020	Empire	Yes	Yes	Yes	Yes	Directed 3 episodes, wrote 2 episodes
2016–2019	Star	Yes	Yes	Yes	Yes	Directed 3 episodes, wrote 2 episodes
2021–present	The Ms. Pat Show	No	No	Yes	No	
2021–2023	The Wonder Years	No	No	Yes	No	
TBA	The Spook Who Sat by the Door	No	No	Yes	No	

Acting roles

Year	Title	Role	Episode
2015	Empire	Himself	"Sinned Against"
2017	Star	Video director	"The Winner Takes it All"
2019	BoJack Horseman	Flea Daniels	"The New Client"

Reality show appearances

- My Big Break (2009)
- The Black List: Volume 3 (2010)
- Finding Your Roots (2022)

== Critical reception ==
Year	Title	Rotten Tomatoes	Metacritic
2005	Shadowboxer	17%	33
2009	Precious	92%	78
2012	The Paperboy	45%	45
2013	Lee Daniels' The Butler	72%	65
2021	The United States vs. Billie Holiday	55%	52
2024	The Deliverance	30%	38

== See also ==
- LGBT culture in New York City
- List of LGBT people from New York City
- NYC Pride March
