= Hotel Theresa =

Building in Manhattan, New York

- U.S. National Register of Historic Places
- New York State Register of Historic Places
- New York City Landmark
- (2019)
- Location: 2082–2096 Adam Clayton Powell, Jr. Blvd. Manhattan, New York City
- Coordinates: 40°48′31″N 73°56′58″W
- Built: 1912–1913
- Architects: George & Edward Blum
- NRHP reference No.: 05000618
- NYSRHP No.: 06101.007743
- NYCL No.: 1843

Significant dates
- Added to NRHP: June 16, 2005
- Designated NYSRHP: April 15, 2005
- Designated NYCL: July 13, 1993

The Hotel Theresa is located at 2082–96 Adam Clayton Powell Jr. Boulevard between West 124th and 125th Streets in the Harlem neighborhood of Manhattan, New York City. In the mid-20th century, it was a vibrant center of African American life in the area and the city.

The 13-story hotel was built in 1912–13 by German-born stockbroker Gustavus Sidenberg (1843–1915), whose wife the hotel is named after, and was designed by the firm of George & Edward Blum, who specialized in designing apartment buildings. The hotel, which was known in its heyday as "the Waldorf of Harlem", exemplifies the Blums' inventive use of terracotta for ornamentation, and has been called "one of the most visually striking structures in northern Manhattan".

The building, now an office building known as Theresa Towers, was designated a New York City landmark in 1993 and was added to the National Register of Historic Places in 2005.

== History ==
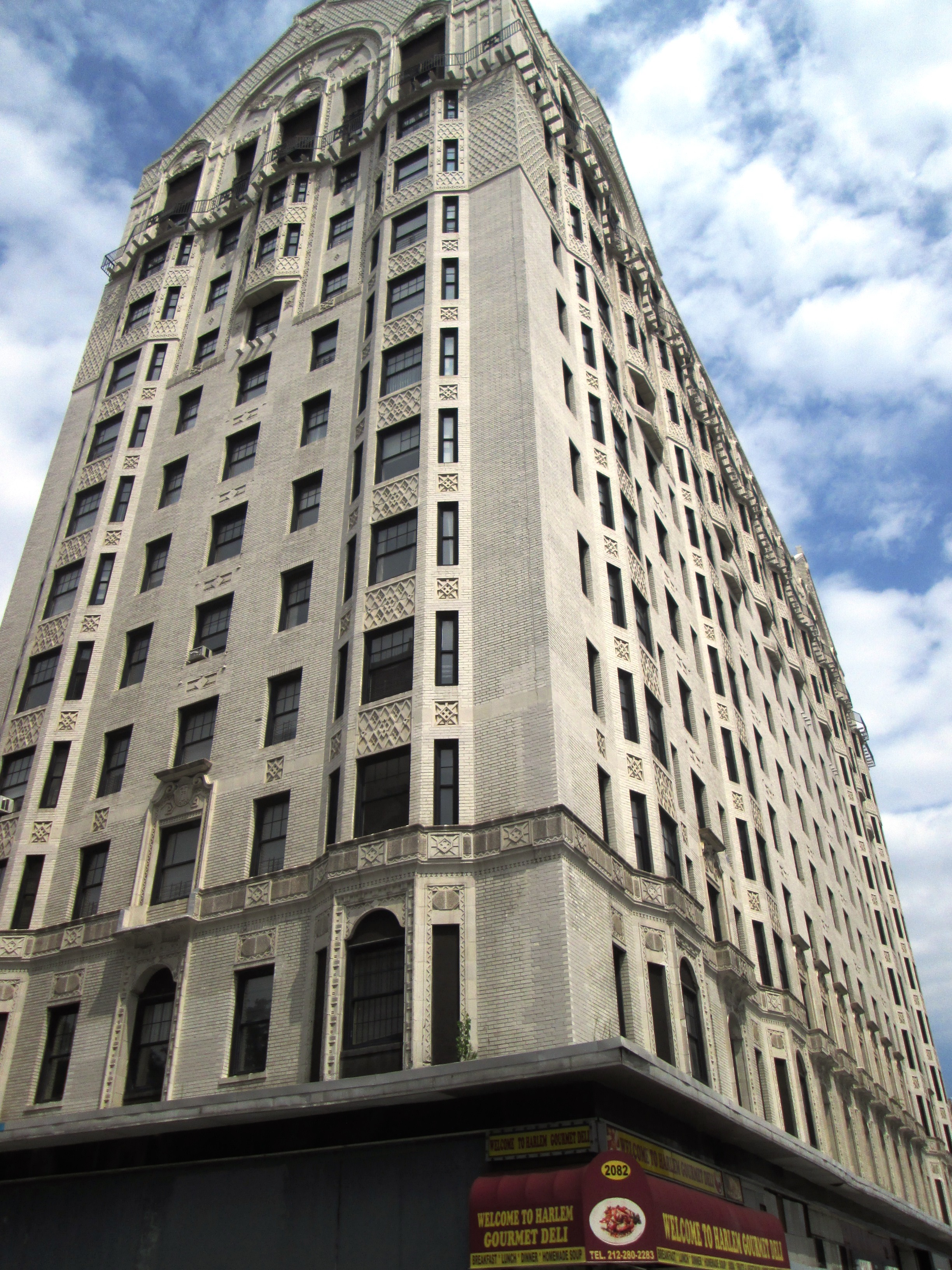
The Theresa from below at 124th Street (2013)

The 13-story hotel – with its striking white terracotta façade with ornamentation made specifically for the project and not pre-fabricated stock items, as was standard practice – opened in 1913 and was, until the construction of the Adam Clayton Powell Jr. State Office Building across the street in 1973, the tallest building in Harlem. It was primarily an apartment hotel, but also accepted temporary guests. In its early years, the hotel accepted only white guests, but it was bought in 1937 by Love B. Woods, an African American businessman who, in 1940, ended its racial segregation policy.

The hotel had a two-story penthouse dining room which featured views of Long Island Sound to the east and the Palisades to the west, as well as a bar and grill. In the 1940s and 1950s, the Theresa became a center of the social life of the black community of Harlem; it was then that it was known as "the Waldorf of Harlem". The hotel profited from the refusal of prestigious hotels elsewhere in the city to accept black guests. As a result, black businessmen, performers, and athletes were thrown under the same roof. The building was also the location of such institutions as A. Philip Randolph's March on Washington Movement, the March Community Bookstore, and the Organization of Afro-American Unity created by Malcolm X after he left the Nation of Islam.

In 1960, Fidel Castro came to New York for the opening session of the United Nations, and, after leaving the Hotel Shelburne on Lexington Avenue in Midtown Manhattan because of the management's demand for a $20,000 deposit, he and his entourage stayed at the Theresa, where they rented 80 rooms for $800 per day. Malcolm X and other civil rights leaders arranged for their stay. According to The New York Times, Castro felt that "Negroes would be more sympathetic" to his cause, and indeed he drew enthusiastic crowds of supporters, along with some protesters. While Castro was there, he was visited by Soviet Premier Nikita Khrushchev, activist Malcolm X, poets Langston Hughes and Allen Ginsberg, President Gamal Abdel Nasser of Egypt, Prime Minister Jawaharlal Nehru of India, and radical sociologist C. Wright Mills. In a repudiation of segregationist policies, Castro also thanked the hotel's all-black staff by hosting them at a steak dinner held in the hotel's own banquet room. Subsequent to Castro's visit, other Third World leaders, such as Patrice Lumumba of the Belgian Congo, chose to stay at the Theresa.

In October 1960, John F. Kennedy campaigned for the presidency at the hotel, along with Eleanor Roosevelt and other leading figures in the Democratic Party.

Ron Brown, who was the United States Secretary of Commerce in the Clinton administration, grew up in the hotel, where his father worked as manager, and U.S. Congressman Charles Rangel (D-Harlem) once worked there as a desk clerk.

The hotel suffered from the continued deterioration of Harlem through the 1950s and 1960s and, ironically, from the end of segregation elsewhere in the city. As African Americans of means now had alternatives, they stopped coming to Harlem. The owners had not upgraded or modernized the hotel in decades and it was said to be "dowdy" at best.

New owners began converting the building to office space beginning in 1966, and the hotel closed in 1967. The building was renovated and restored, with the exterior largely kept as it had originally been, instead of being replaced with an aluminum and glass façade, an alternative which had been considered. The building reopened in 1970 as Theresa Towers, though a sign with the old name is still painted on the side of the building, and the old name is still commonly used. As well as housing commercial and professional tenants, it serves as an auxiliary campus for Columbia University's Teachers College and the Touro College of Pharmacy.

== Notable guests, tenants and employees ==
- Muhammad Ali – boxer
- Eddie "Rochester" Anderson – actor, comedian
- Louis Armstrong – musician, singer, actor
- Josephine Baker – singer, dancer, actress, activist
- Ron Brown – politician
- Fidel Castro – President of Cuba
- Ray Charles – singer, musician
- Kenneth Clark – educator
- Sam Cooke – singer, musician
- Dorothy Dandridge – actress, singer
- Duke Ellington – jazz musician, bandleader, composer
- Jimi Hendrix – rock musician
- Lena Horne – singer
- Zora Neale Hurston – author, anthropologist
- Andy Kirk – musician, bandleader (managed the Theresa bar)
- A. Philip Randolph – activist, anti-poverty activist
- Charles Rangel – politician (desk clerk)
- Little Richard – singer, musician
- Joe Louis – boxer
- Malcolm X – activist
- Sugar Ray Robinson – boxer
- Dinah Washington – singer
- Little Willie John – singer
- Otis Redding – singer
- Buddy Holly – singer

== In popular culture ==
- Some scenes of Alfred Hitchcock's movie Topaz, the plot of which revolves around the 1962 Cuban Missile Crisis, are set in and in front of the Hotel Theresa.
- The Hotel Theresa is one of the settings in the novel Push and the film Precious (2009). Precious' Each One Teach One alternative school is on the "nineteenth floor".
- WLIB-1190 AM (known as Harlem Radio Center) maintained studios here from 1952 to 1962.
- In Guy Johnson's novel Standing at the Scratch Line, the hotel lobby is where King, Big Ed and Professor plan the execution of the heads of two Mafia families trying to muscle in on their club.
- Colson Whitehead's "The Theresa Job" (The New Yorker, July 26, 2021) is about a 1959 robbery at the hotel. This robbery premise was later expanded and became the focal point of Whitehead's 2021 novel Harlem Shuffle.

== See also ==
- List of former hotels in Manhattan
- List of New York City Designated Landmarks in Manhattan above 110th Street
- National Register of Historic Places listings in Manhattan above 110th Street
