= 210 East 68th Street =

Apartment building in Manhattan, New York

- Building at 210 East 68th Street
- U.S. National Register of Historic Places
- New York State Register of Historic Places
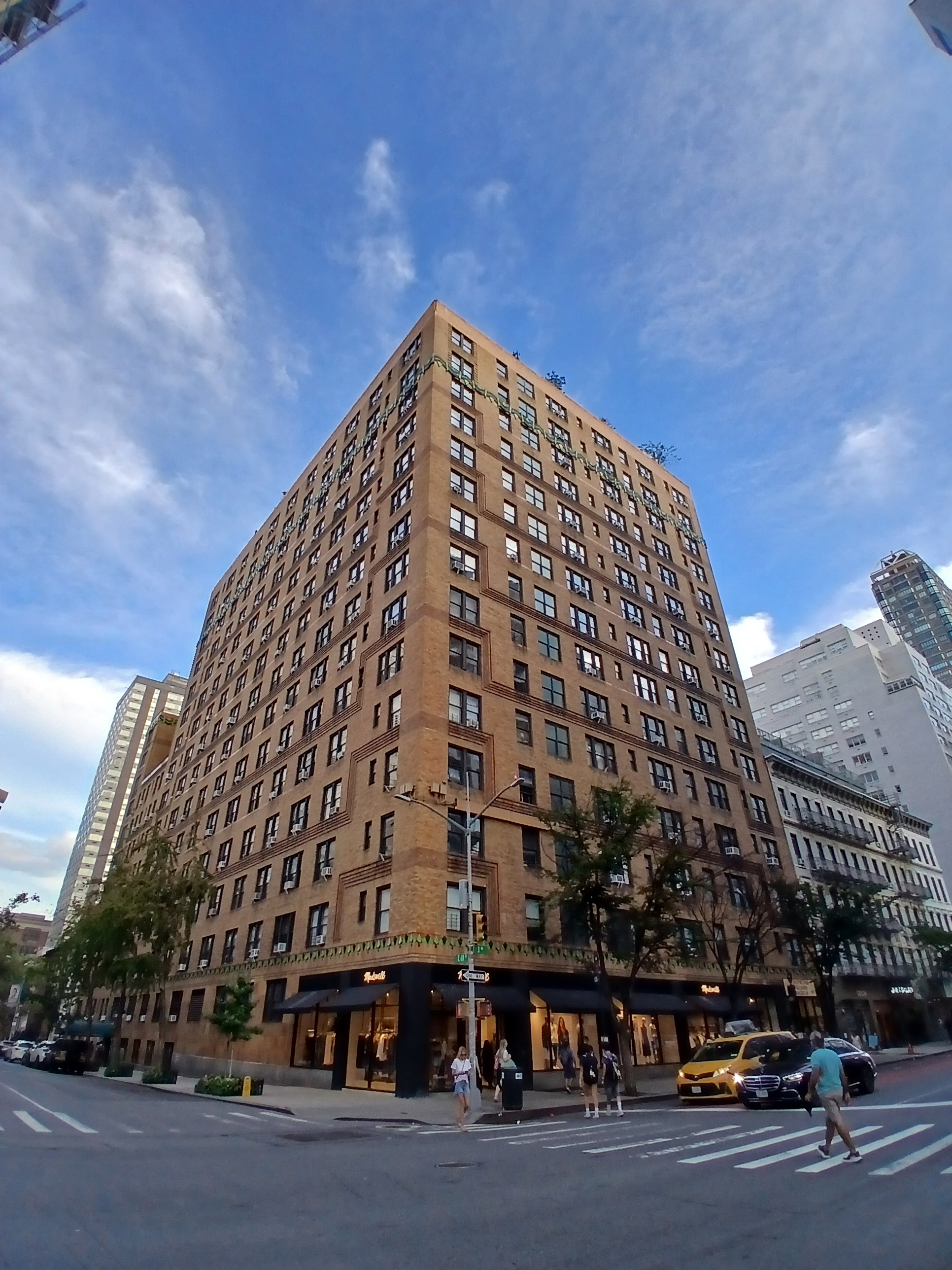

- Location within Manhattan Location within New York City Location within New York Location within the United States
- Location: 210 E. 68th St., Manhattan, New York, US
- Coordinates: 40°46′01″N 73°57′46″W
- Area: less than one acre
- Built: 1928
- Architect: George Blum and Edward Blum
- Architectural style: Art Deco
- NRHP reference No.: 05000619
- NYSRHP No.: 06101.009008

Significant dates
- Added to NRHP: June 16, 2005
- Designated NYSRHP: May 13, 2005

210 East 68th Street is an apartment building in the Upper East Side neighborhood of Manhattan, New York City, United States. Designed in the Art Deco style by George and Edward Blum, it was constructed in 1928–1929. The building has an orange brick facade with multicolored terracotta decorations, laid in a distinctive pattern. Inside, a vestibule and lobby lead to 200 apartments. The building is listed on the National Register of Historic Places.

== Description ==
210 East 68th Street is an apartment building on the Upper East Side of Manhattan in New York City, New York, US. The building occupies the southeast corner of Third Avenue and 68th Street. The 21,087-square-foot (1,959.0 m^{2}) land lot is mostly rectangular, with a frontage measuring 210 feet (64 m) on 68th Street and 100 feet (30 m) on Third Avenue. It is two blocks north of the Manhattan House apartment building. Five-story houses line 68th Street to the east, and there are other apartment buildings surrounding 210 East 68th Street.

210 East 68th Street was designed in the Art Deco style by George and Edward Blum and is among the city's first Art Deco apartment buildings. Because the site slopes down to the east, it is 16 stories high at its eastern end but only 15 stories high at Third Avenue on its western end. Although historians Andrew Dolkart and Susan Tunick wrote that the Blums' work was generally poorly documented, they tended to give their buildings distinctive decorative features, such as multicolored terracotta decoration on the exterior of 210 East 68th Street. The New York Times described the building as an example of the Blums' "terra-cotta bravura".

=== Exterior ===
On both the Third Avenue (western) and 68th Street (northern) elevations, the facade is clad with orange or buff brick. Both elevations of the facade are divided vertically into multiple bays. The building was distinguished from contemporary structures by its use of terracotta bands. These bands use Art Deco-themed colors such as orange, black, and shades of green; unlike at other Art Deco buildings, these colors overlap and are interwoven. Christopher Gray of The New York Times suggested that the terracotta bands were included "perhaps because they were fighting the hulking Third Avenue elevated train nearby" (which has since been demolished). The facade has horizontal terracotta and brick bands, accented by darker brick; the bands, spaced every two stories, are composed of horizontal courses of alternating brick headers and stretchers. The bands create meandering patterns that span several stories, zigging upward one story in the outermost bays. These specific decorations are uncommon elsewhere in New York City, except in two other buildings the Blums designed.

Window patterns on Third Avenue, showing windows measuring one, two, and three lights wide, along with very small windows (left to right)

The Third Avenue elevation consists of ten bays, which are nearly symmetrical to each other. The entire ground floor is clad with storefronts, which have been significantly modified from their original design. Above runs a terracotta band with orange, green, and black geometric motifs, such as a rhombus and triangle. The second to fifteenth stories have windows, which are separated horizontally by brick bands. Most windows measure one, two, or three lights wide; these are interspersed with very small windows. Above the thirteenth story (two stories below the roof) runs a terracotta band with two black zigzagging lines superimposed with triangles and angled slashes. The roofline has no cornice, unlike in contemporary buildings.

On 68th Street, there are no storefronts except at the western end, where there is a storefront at the corner with Third Avenue. On the lowest section of the facade, there is a water table made of granite; the basement has windows only within the eastern section, due to the downward slope of the site. The first story is clad with square orange blocks and a continuation of the terracotta band on Third Avenue. The main entrance, at the center of the 68th Street elevation, is slightly recessed and has curved bronze-and-glass piers flanking a double door; the entrance uses glass brick for decoration. Near the eastern end of the 68th Street elevation, a smaller door leads directly into a "professional apartment" at 212 East 68th Street, occupied by a tenant. The upper section of the facade is similar to that on Third Avenue, albeit with setbacks.

The eastern and southern elevations have plain brick facades, interrupted by windows. Interior courtyards are clad with plain brick and is traversed horizontally by concrete bands with geometric motifs.

=== Interior ===
The building's main entrance leads to a rectangular vestibule with a set of double doors leading to the lobby. The vestibule has stone walls topped by mirrors, as well as plaster ceilings. The lobby spans several terraced levels, connected by short flights of steps, and has several doors and furniture with scallop motifs. Just below the vestibule, there is a closet to the east (left) and a wooden concierge desk to the west (right). Another short set of steps leads to the sitting room, a square space with terrazzo floors, plaster walls and ceilings, a cabinet, a grille, and another concierge desk with scallop motifs. From the sitting room, a passageway leads south to elevators and the ground-level apartments. When the building was completed, Town & Country magazine wrote that the lobby "represents a cool, dispassionate admiration for Twentieth Century shapes and products as applied to Twentieth Century living".

The upper levels have long, narrow elevator corridors, which are simple in design and lead to apartments of varying sizes. There are about 200 apartments inside. As built, each apartment had one to six rooms, including up to three bathrooms.

== History ==
210 East 68th Street was one of many apartment buildings constructed on the Upper East Side during the late 19th and early 20th century. It was built by Sophia Buttenweiser Mayer and designed by George and Edward Blum as a speculative development; at the time, Mayer was married to real-estate developer Bernhard Mayer. Plans for a 15-story apartment building at the southeast corner of Third Avenue and 68th Street were filed in June 1928, at which point the building was to cost $1.3 million. The Blums, by then, had been developing apartment buildings in New York City for several decades. J. H. Taylor Construction Company began constructing 210 East 68th Street that November, and Donald W. Brown was hired to rent out the apartments.

The building was completed in 1929. Many of the early residents were wealthy, though not as much as those who occupied the higher-end mansions on Fifth Avenue, at the Upper East Side's western fringe. The facade remained largely intact over the years, although the windows have been gradually replaced. During the mid-20th century, the building was owned by the 1069 Park Avenue Company. Sol Goldman acquired the building in 1975, at which point the building had four storefronts, four offices, and 188 apartments. In 2005, the building was listed on the National Register of Historic Places.

== See also ==
- National Register of Historic Places listings in Manhattan from 59th to 110th Streets

== Sources ==
- Dolkart, Andrew D.; Tunick, Susan (1993). George & Edward Blum: Texture and Design in New York Apartment House Architecture. Princeton Architectural Press. ISBN 978-0-9636061-0-5.
- National Register of Historic Places Inventory/Nomination: Building at 210 East 68th Street (PDF) (Report). National Park Service. 2005.
