= Gustavus Sidenberg =

Financier who built the Hotel Theresa (1843–1915)

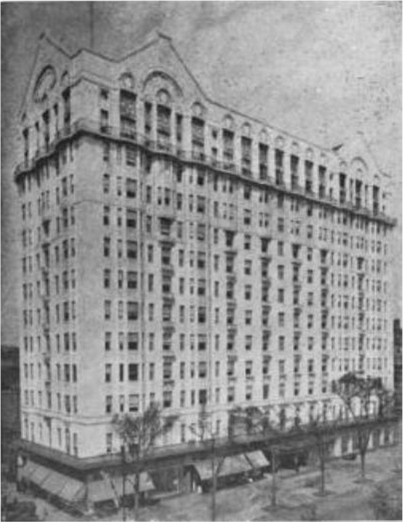
Sidenberg's Hotel Theresa

Gustavus Sidenberg (22 May 1843 – 22 January 1915) was a Jewish-American manufacturer and financier best known for building New York City's Hotel Theresa, which has become a New York City landmark on the National Register of Historic Places.

== Life ==
Sidenberg was born in Trachenberg, near Breslau, in Silesia, which was then part of the kingdom of Prussia. He was the first son of Wilhelm Sidenberg (16 April 1782 – 15 May 1817) and Henriette Bruck Sidenberg (16 September 1815 – 18 May 1896). On 14 September 1854, he arrived in New York City on the ship Elizabeth with his mother, three younger brothers, a sister, and perhaps other relatives; his father seems to have traveled to the United States separately. The family first went to New Bedford, Massachusetts, and then moved to Missouri where Wilhelm worked as a peddler. With the outbreak of the American Civil War, the Sidenberg family moved to New York City. By 1863, Sidenberg was in business with his father as G. Sidenberg and Company; his brothers Henry Sidenberg and Richard Sidenberg shared the same business address and their families were frequently associated with Gustavus in this business. The firm was a manufacturer and importer of collars and cuffs, specializing in ladies linen and lace collars, cuffs, rufflings, veils, and sleeves.

On 26 June 1866, in New York City, Sidenberg married Theresa Goldsmith (22 April 1848 – 19 February 1910). For the remainder of the nineteenth century, the firm of G. Sidenberg and Company continued, at various Manhattan addresses, and did an extensive business in both the manufacture and importation of lace goods. They advertised heavily and employed traveling salesmen throughout the United States. In 1898, Sidenberg left the family firm and purchased a seat on the New York Stock Exchange. Doing business as Sidenberg and Kraus, brokers, they specialized in purchase and sale of bonds. In 1892, he built a steam yacht, which had been designed by the noted marine architect Henry I Gielow and constructed at the yard of C.R. Poillon in Brooklyn. He named the yacht Theresa, and became a regular in New York boating circles. Sidenberg was also a patron of the Metropolitan Opera and of a number of Jewish charities. After the death of his first wife in 1910, he married Therese, or Theresa, Wertheimer Gumbinner (22 March 1858 - ?).

On 22 January 1915, Sidenberg died at his home at 40 W. 56th Street in New York City. He had no children. His estate was divided among several charities and the families of his brothers and sisters.

== Hotel Theresa ==
In 1892, Sidenberg had purchased the old Hotel Winthrop on 7th Avenue between 124th and 125th streets in Harlem. In 1912, the Winthrop was demolished and replaced by a new building designed by brothers George & Edward Blum; the thirteen-story building was originally planned as a residential hotel with most rooms constructed as suites for long-term residents. Stores occupied the ground floor. When built, it was praised as the tallest structure in Harlem. The new hotel was named in honor of his two wives, Hotel Theresa. The building, which survives as the Theresa Towers, later became a center of the Harlem Renaissance and is now on the National Register of Historic Places. It has become a regular stop on commercial tours of Harlem.
