= Geoffrey S. Fletcher =

American screenwriter and film director (born 1970)

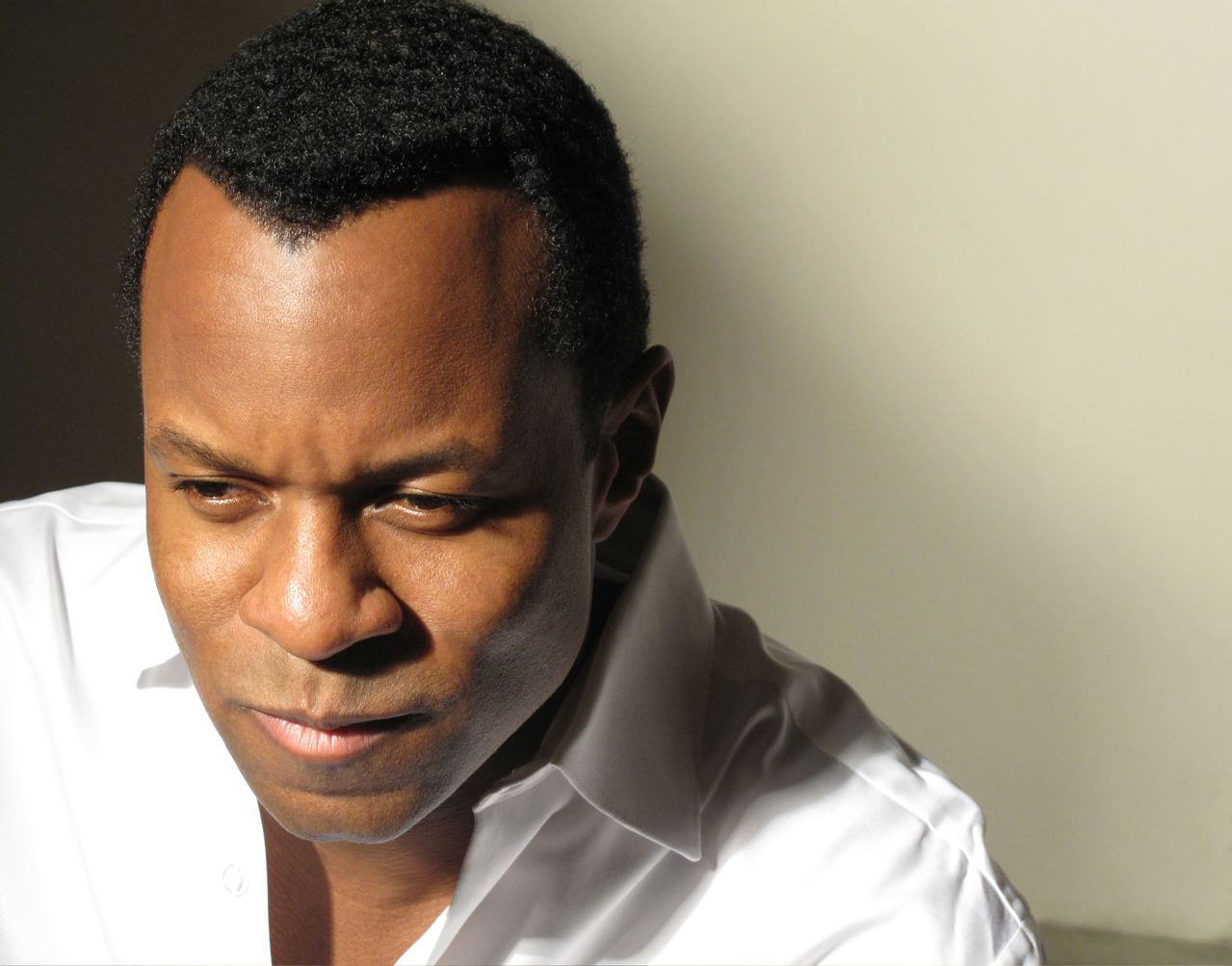
- Born: Geoffrey Shawn Fletcher; October 4, 1970 (age 55); New London, Connecticut, U.S.
- Education: Harvard University (BA); New York University (MFA)
- Occupations: Screenwriter, film director

Geoffrey Shawn Fletcher (born October 4, 1970) is an American screenwriter and film director. Fletcher is best known for being the screenwriter of Precious, for which he received the Academy Award for Best Adapted Screenplay, becoming the first African American to receive an Academy Award for writing. In September 2010, Fletcher began shooting Violet & Daisy in New York City based on his original script as his directorial debut. It was released in a limited theatrical run in June 2013.

== Early life ==
Fletcher was born in New London, Connecticut, one of three children of Alphonse Fletcher Sr. and Bettye R. Fletcher. Alphonse Fletcher Jr. and Todd Fletcher are his brothers. Fletcher attended Waterford High School in Waterford, Connecticut, prior to completing his secondary education at Choate Rosemary Hall. Fletcher graduated from Harvard College where he concentrated in psychology and from NYU's Tisch School where he earned a Master of Fine Arts. His student film Magic Markers, which he wrote and directed, was shown at festivals and caught the attention of director John Singleton.

== Career ==
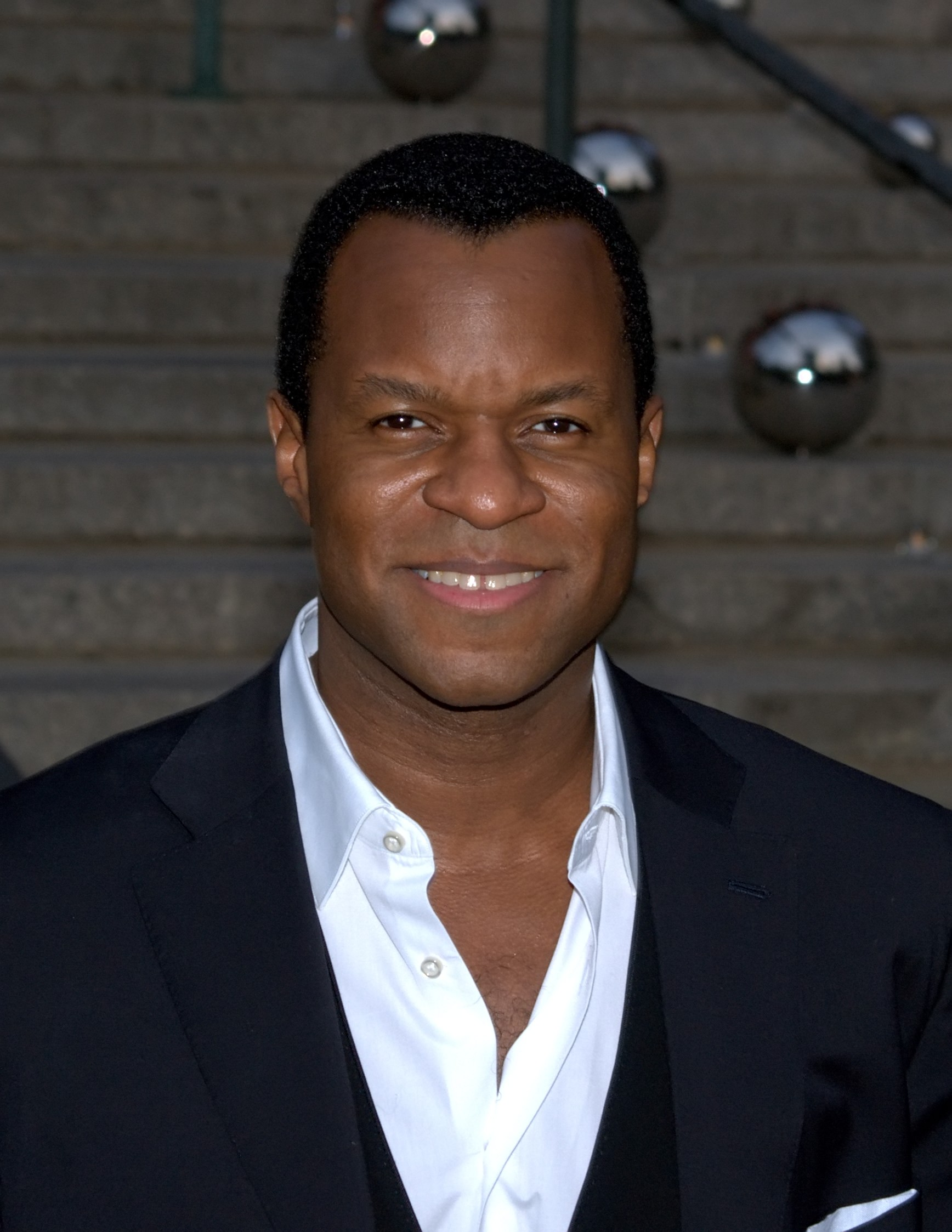
Fletcher at the 2010 Tribeca Film Festival.

Fletcher worked in a variety of temporary staff positions for years as he wrote and directed his own films. Eventually he was appointed an adjunct professor at Tisch and also at Columbia. In 2006, producer Lee Daniels viewed Magic Markers and asked Fletcher to adapt the book Push by Sapphire which became the film Precious. Daniels, well known to be "passionately dedicated" to artists "serious about their craft," considered several writers before choosing Fletcher according to a Variety article that included Fletcher among the "Ten Screenwriters to Watch." Fletcher is represented by his agents Bill Weinstein, Nicky Mohebbi, and Manal Hamad of Verve and by the law firm of Gang, Tyre, Ramer, and Brown.

On February 16, 2010, director Doug Liman and Fletcher announced that they would be collaborating on a film re-creation of the 1971 Attica state prison rebellion. Fletcher said in a statement "Working with a remarkable director in Doug Liman whose family history binds him personally to this project, I hope to create opportunities for re-examination of this dramatic crossroad in our nation's history while contributing to the current dialogue on the value of protecting everyone's rights."

== Filmography ==
Year	Title	Director	Writer	Producer
2009	Precious	No	Yes	No
2011	Violet & Daisy	Yes	Yes	Yes
2018	Trial by Fire	No	Yes	No

== Recognition ==
=== Screenwriting awards for Precious ===
- Best Adapted Screenplay at 82nd Academy Awards
- Best First Screenplay at 25th Independent Spirit Awards
- Winner Outstanding Writing in a Motion Picture at 41st NAACP Image Awards
- Best Screenplay – Adapted Geoffrey Fletcher at 14th Satellite Awards
- Best Screenplay Geoffrey Fletcher at 7th AAFCA Awards
- Best Screenplay, Original or Adapted Geoffrey Fletcher at 10th Black Reel Awards

=== Screenwriting nominations for Precious ===
- Best Screenplay – Adapted at 8th Washington D.C. Area Film Critics Association
- Best Screenplay, Adapted at 4th Alliance of Women Film Journalists Award
- Best Screenplay at 3rd Houston Film Critics Society Awards
- Best Adapted Screenplay at 14th Florida Film Critics Circle Awards
- Scripter Award at Sapphire 23rd USC Scripter Awards
- Adapted Screenplay at 62nd Writers Guild of America Awards
- Adapted Screenplay at 63rd British Academy Film Awards

=== Awards and Festivals for Magic Markers ===
- Directors Guild of America Student Film Award, 1996.
- Shown at Hamptons International Film Festival October 18–22, 1995.
- Shown at Sundance Film Festival (Shorts Program) in Park City, Utah January 18–28, 1996.

== See also ==
- List of Academy Award records
