= Edward Blum =

Edward Blum may refer to:

- Edward Blum (activist) (born 1952), American director of Project on Fair Representation and visiting fellow at American Enterprise Institute
- Edward Blum (architect) (1867–1944), French-American designer of apartment and office buildings
- Ed Blum, director of Scenes of a Sexual Nature
