= Superlove (Lenny Kravitz song) =

2011 song by Lenny Kravitz

Song by Lenny Kravitz

from the album Black and White America
- Released: August 22, 2011
- Recorded: 2010–11
- Studio: Eleuthera Island, Bahamas
- Length: 3:29
- Label: Loud & Proud; Roadrunner
- Songwriters: Lenny Kravitz; Craig Ross
- Producer: Kravitz

"Superlove"

Single by Avicii vs. Lenny Kravitz

from the album Black and White America
- Released: May 29, 2012
- Recorded: 2011–12
- Length: 5:22
- Label: Roadrunner
- Songwriters: Lenny Kravitz; Craig Ross; Avicii
- Producers: Kravitz; Avicii

Avicii singles chronology
"Silhouettes" (2012)	"Superlove" (2012)	"Last Dance" (2012)

Lenny Kravitz singles chronology
"Push" (2012)	"Superlove" (2012)	"The Chamber" (2014)

Music video
- "Avicii vs Lenny Kravitz - Superlove" on YouTube

"Superlove" is a song by Lenny Kravitz from his 2011 album Black and White America, which was remixed by Avicii. The track was released on May 29, 2012 as a digital download in the United Kingdom and charted in the UK, Belgium, Hungary and the Netherlands. Lenny has released a music video for this song to YouTube on August 27.

== Track listing ==
Digital download
No.	Title	Length
1.	"Superlove"	5:22

== Charts ==
Chart (2012)	Peak position
Belgium (Ultratip Bubbling Under Flanders)	7
Belgium (Ultratop 50 Wallonia)	29
Hungary (Dance Top 40)	16
Hungary (Single Top 40)	6
Netherlands (Single Top 100)	25
Poland (Dance Top 50)	18
UK Singles (OCC)	49
US Dance Club Songs (Billboard)	2

== Release history ==
Region	Date	Format	Label
United Kingdom	May 29, 2012	Digital download	Roadrunner
