= Stand (Lenny Kravitz song) =

Single by Lenny Kravitz

from the album Black and White America
- Released: June 3, 2011
- Length: 3:12
- Label: Roadrunner
- Songwriter: Lenny Kravitz
- Producer: Lenny Kravitz

Lenny Kravitz singles chronology
"Come On Get It" (2011)	"Stand" (2011)	"Rock Star City Life" (2011)

"Stand" is a song produced, written, arranged, composed and performed by Lenny Kravitz from his album, Black and White America (2011). It was released as the album's second single and the iTunes download release date for the song was June 3, 2011. The song was written by Kravitz about a close friend, who was paralyzed from the waist down from an accident, who later recovered.

"Stand" was covered by the cast of the television series Glee during the third season.

== Critical reception ==
Matthew Perpetua of Rolling Stone gave the song a three stars rating out of five commenting "The second single from Kravitz's Black and White America, due out August 30th, borrows the melodic phrasing of vintage cranky Elvis Costello, yet still somehow sounds like a groovy windows-down, volume-up summer hit. It's fluffy stuff, but also a welcome curveball." Melinda Newman of HitFix named it "Summer's best song" and explained it is "a perfect pop slice that is implanted into your head after one listen".

== Music video ==
The music video for "Stand" was directed by Paul Hunter. It premiered on VH1 on July 14, 2011.

In the video, Kravitz portrays three characters: Bart Billingsworth, host of a crooked game show "Run for Your Money" (with some similarities to the old Let's Make a Deal), and the game-show house-band drummer Bubba Washington and lead singer Desmond Richie. The host and his beautiful assistants fraudulently switch the valuable prizes for low-value booby prizes without the contestants figuring it out. However, the drummer sees the back-stage goings-on, and pushes on the button that opens the curtains, so that the audience sees the "Cheat-O-Rama 3000" machine and the host preparing to drive away with the prizes. The audience then gets angry and mobs the stage, seizing the stolen prizes. The host tries to escape with at least some of his ill-gotten gains, but the prize car doesn't work.

== Live performances ==
Lenny Kravitz performed the song on CBS's Late Show with David Letterman.

== Charts ==
Chart (2011)	Peak position
Austria (Ö3 Austria Top 40)	41
Germany (Media Control AG)	44
Japan (Japan Hot 100)	16
Italy	33
Netherlands (Single Top 100)	100
Slovakia (IFPI)	63
Spain (Promusicae)	49
Switzerland (Schweizer Hitparade)	41
US Triple A (Billboard)	28
US Adult Top 40 (Billboard)	29
