= Rock Star City Life =

Single by Lenny Kravitz

from the album Black and White America
- Released: July 7, 2011
- Genre: Rock
- Length: 3:24
- Label: Roadrunner, Loud & Proud
- Songwriters: Lenny Kravitz, Craig Ross
- Producer: Lenny Kravitz

Lenny Kravitz singles chronology
"Stand" (2011)	"Rock Star City Life" (2011)	"Black and White America" (2011)

Music video
- Lenny Kravitz - Rock Star City Life on YouTube

"Rock Star City Life" is a song recorded by the American singer Lenny Kravitz and released on February 20, 2011, as the third single from his album Black and White America. The track was the last one recorded for the album.

== Background ==
The song is a funky guitar composition written with rock-and-roll colors about Kravitz's admiration for a glamorous underage named Lolita.

Kravitz explained to Rolling Stone, "The process was longer than any other time I've made an album. I definitely prolonged it. There were points where I said, 'The album's done.' Then I'd go to Europe and be playing it in the car, and I'm like, 'No, I hear more stuff.' It's the first time that I've gone this far in shaping, reshaping, shaping, reshaping, shaping, reshaping. And the result is that I'm actually 100 percent satisfied with every millisecond of the album."

== Reception ==
Ryan Reed of Paste stated, "Unfortunately, Kravitz’s whiter side proves far less interesting. The rollicking "Rock Star City Life" is catchy in a commercial kinda way—you certainly don’t feel good about singing along (even as you inevitably do). The lyrics are generic (as you can deduce, based on the title), even if every detail of the production and arrangement is immaculately groomed." James Montgomery of MTV called the song "a down-and-dirty ode to excess".

== Charts ==
Chart (2011)	Peak position
Austria (Ö3 Austria Top 40)	62
Germany (GfK)	98
