= Black and White America =

Studio album by Lenny Kravitz
- Released: August 29, 2011
- Recorded: Eleuthera Island, Bahamas; 2009–2011
- Studios: Gregory Town Sound, Studio Noir
- Genre: Funk rock
- Length: 66:20
- Labels: Roadrunner, Loud & Proud
- Producer: Lenny Kravitz

Lenny Kravitz chronology
It Is Time for a Love Revolution (2008)	Black and White America (2011)	Strut (2014)

Singles from Black and White America
- 1. "Come On Get It" Released: February 20, 2011; 2. "Stand" Released: June 3, 2011; 3. "Rock Star City Life" Released: July 7, 2011; 4. "Black and White America" Released: September 19, 2011; 5. "Push" Released: October 21, 2011; 6. "Superlove" Released: May 29, 2012

Black and White America is the ninth studio album by American rock musician Lenny Kravitz, released on August 30, 2011. The album also produced six singles released in 2011 and 2012.

== Background ==
On his official website, Kravitz stated, "I don't know what it's called yet, it felt like Negrophilia, and then... it felt like something else." On December 13, 2010, Kravitz announced that the new album was to be called Black and White America, and it would be his first album on Roadrunner Records/Atlantic Records under joint label Loud & Proud.

While in Bahamas, he "got inspired to write a completely different album." "I was channel-surfing in the Bahamas one night and came across this documentary, [...] I don't remember what it was called, but it had all these people talking about President Obama— how they didn't approve of his being elected and wanted to take their country back, any way they could. I know that there's racism, but to hear people voice it in such a hateful way – I had to write a rebuttal."

Later, Kravitz stated that even when Black and White America was created during his intentions to make Negrophilia, rumours commenting on the former and latter were "wrong information on the Internet which I wish would go away.", finally saying that "this has nothing to do with Negrophilia."

As stated in an interview with The San Francisco Chronicle, Kravitz said that "The simplicity works for me. Being there that long put me at a place of peace and allowed me to focus on my art. That was really incredible." When asked by The Miami Herald, he answered that "I can't compare any of my music. They all just stand for what they stand for; they're just individual pieces, you know what I mean? The only difference is they're new."

Kravitz announced on his official Facebook page that "Come On Get It", used in an NBA commercial in late 2010, would be the album's first single. The second single, titled "Stand", was released on Facebook, for iTunes; a video was released on YouTube and on Vevo on June 6. "Push" was released as the third single.

== Promotion ==
Lenny Kravitz performed "Stand" on the Late Show with David Letterman. On September 1, 2011, he performed "Rock Star City Life" on Late Night with Jimmy Fallon.

== Critical reception ==
Professional ratings
Aggregate scores
Source	Rating
AnyDecentMusic?	6.2/10
Metacritic	68/100
Review scores
Source	Rating
AllMusic	4/5 stars
American Songwriter	3/5 stars
Classic Rock	3.5/5 stars
Entertainment Weekly	B
Mojo	2/5 stars
MusicOMH	3/5 stars
The New Zealand Herald	4/5 stars
Paste	6.5/10
Q	3/5 stars
Rolling Stone	3.5/5 stars

Upon its release, Black and White America received generally positive reviews. At Metacritic, which assigns a weighted mean rating out of 100 to reviews from mainstream critics, the album received an average score of 68, based on eight reviews, which indicates "generally favorable reviews". At AnyDecentMusic?, that collates critical reviews from more than 50 media sources, the album scored 6.2 points out of 10, based on 10 reviews.

Stephen Thomas Erlewine of AllMusic praised the album, saying "he (Kravitz) has come up with his best record in years, a shamelessly enjoyable piece of aural candy." American Songwriter said, "Black and White America is a laudable musical statement, and a much needed reminder of how prodigious Kravitz is at melding together rock and funk." Giving it a B rating, Mikael Wood of Entertainment Weekly described the album as "a melting pot of funk, soul, rock, and other made-in-the-USA genres, with songs about growing up biracial after civil rights (the '70s-inspired title track) and plenty of hopey-changey stuff (Stand, Push)."

Rolling Stone writer Anthony Decurtis commented "Kravitz is most gripping at his most personal, but he doesn't sustain that intensity. Still, each of these 16 songs succeeds on its own terms, which is a vision for America beyond the black and white divide." Remi of SoulBounce argued that "even as you play Lenny Bingo, marking off the familiar styles he dusts off over the course of the album, you'll find yourself weighing the 2011 editions pretty favorably against their progenitors." Melinda Newman of HitFix said "Though everything Kravitz does here is deeply rooted in his stellar guitar work and the beat, it's his most experimental album in years". She added "Like Marvin Gaye or Al Green, Kravitz is able to blend both the sensual and the spiritual." and described the album "robust, full and uplifting."

Ryan Reed of Paste Magazine added " Rumored to be the realization of his long-awaited "funk album," Black and White proves that half-accurate. Many moments rank high on the Kravitz funkiness chart, including the fantastic title track—which rides liquidy slap-bass and buzzing synth, fleshed out by interjections from glistening strings and horns... The "blacker" he gets, the better he gets". Chris Coplan of Consequence of Sound mentioned "As the son of a Jewish father and a black mother, Lenny Kravitz has spent a lifetime towing the line between races and understanding the very essence of duality. Now, for his ninth studio album Black and White America, Kravitz is applying those lessons learned by offering up an effort that balances his older rock output with more diversified sounds and cameos from two of rap's biggest names, Drake and Jay-Z".

== Commercial performance ==
The album was more commercially successful in the European market, where it charted in the top ten in various countries, including a No. 1 debut in Germany and Switzerland. According to Oricon, Black and White America debuted at No. 20 selling 6,000 copies in Japan. The album debuted at No. 17 in the US, selling 20,145 copies. It has sold 61,000 copies in US since its release.

== Track listing ==
All lyrics written by Lenny Kravitz, except "Boongie Drop" co-written by Jay-Z, and "Sunflower" co-written by Drake; all music composed by Lenny Kravitz, except where noted.

1. "Black and White America" – 4:35 (Kravitz, Craig Ross)
2. "Come On Get It" – 4:26 (Kravitz, Ross)
3. "In the Black" – 3:24
4. "Liquid Jesus" – 3:28
5. "Rock Star City Life" – 3:24 (Kravitz, Ross)
6. "Boongie Drop" (featuring Jay-Z and DJ Military) – 3:49
7. "Stand" – 3:20
8. "Superlove" – 3:29 (Kravitz, Ross)
9. "Everything" – 3:38
10. "I Can't Be Without You" – 4:48
11. "Looking Back on Love" – 5:36
12. "Life Ain't Ever Been Better Than It Is Now" – 4:17
13. "The Faith of a Child" – 4:06
14. "Sunflower" (featuring Drake) – 4:14 (Kravitz, Swizz Beatz)
15. "Dream" – 5:11
16. "Push" – 4:23

Japan tour edition disc 1
No.	Title	Length
17.	"Love Casino"	3:51

Japan tour edition disc 2
No.	Title	Length
1.	"Dance Around the Fire"	4:04
2.	"Leaders of Tomorrow"	4:13
3.	"What Do You Want from Me"	3:10
4.	"War"	4:13
5.	"Black and White America" (acoustic)	3:09
6.	"Everything" (acoustic)	3:06

Target deluxe edition
No.	Title	Length
17.	"Dance Around the Fire"	4:03
18.	"Leaders of Tomorrow"	4:12
19.	"What Do You Want From Me"	3:09
20.	"War"	4:12
21.	"Black and White America" (acoustic)	3:08
22.	"Everything" (acoustic)	3:06

iTunes deluxe edition
No.	Title	Length
17.	"War" (bonus track)	4:12
18.	"Black and White America" (acoustic)	3:07
19.	"Stand" (video)	4:54
20.	"Black and White America (Live at The Shack)" (video)	3:02

DVD
No.	Title	Length
1.	"Black and White America" (acoustic)
2.	"Everything" (acoustic)
3.	"Liquid Jesus"
4.	"I Can't Be Without You"
5.	"Dream"
6.	"War"

== Personnel ==
Band

- Lenny Kravitz – vocals, acoustic guitar, electric guitar, piano, synthesizer, bass guitar, drums
- Craig Ross – acoustic guitar, electric guitar
- Harold Todd – saxophone
- Trombone Shorty – trombone
- Michael Hunter – trumpet
- George Laks – keyboard

Production

- Sy Kravitz – cover photo
- Mathieu Bitton – art direction, design, photography, handclaps

== Charts and certifications ==
=== Weekly charts ===
Weekly chart performance for Black and White America
Chart (2011)	Peak position
Argentinian Albums (CAPIF)	6
Austrian Albums (Ö3 Austria)	2
Belgian Albums (Ultratop Flanders)	12
Belgian Albums (Ultratop Wallonia)	7
Czech Albums (ČNS IFPI)	1
Danish Albums (Hitlisten)	29
Dutch Albums (Album Top 100)	2
Finnish Albums (Suomen virallinen lista)	8
French Albums (SNEP)	7
German Albums (Offizielle Top 100)	1
Hungarian Albums (MAHASZ)	26
Italian Albums (FIMI)	8
Japanese Albums (Oricon)	20
Polish Albums (OLiS)	6
Slovenian Albums (IFPI)	13
South Korean Albums (Gaon)	63
South Korean International Albums (Gaon)	9
Spanish Albums (Promusicae)	3
Swedish Albums (Sverigetopplistan)	42
Swiss Albums (Schweizer Hitparade)	1
UK Albums (Official Charts)	75
US Billboard 200	18
US Top Rock Albums (Billboard)	4

=== Year-end charts ===
Year-end chart performance for Black and White America
Chart (2011)	Position
Dutch Albums (Album Top 100)	80
French Albums (SNEP)	69
German Albums (Offizielle Top 100)	93
Swiss Albums (Schweizer Hitparade)	37

=== Certifications ===
Certifications for Black and White America
Country	Certification
Argentina (CAPIF)	Gold
France (SNEP)	Gold
Poland (ZPAV)	Gold
