= The Chamber (song) =

Single by Lenny Kravitz

from the album Strut
- Released: June 24, 2014
- Length: 4:57
- Label: Roxie
- Songwriter: Lenny Kravitz
- Producer: Lenny Kravitz

Lenny Kravitz singles chronology
| "Superlove" (2012) | "The Chamber" (2014) | "Sex" (2014) |

Music video
- "The Chamber" on YouTube

"The Chamber" is a song by American singer Lenny Kravitz, released on June 24, 2014, as the lead single from the album Strut.

== Reception ==
Carla Hay of AXS stated, "'The Chamber' was the first single from Kravitz's 2014 album, Strut. With its Chic-like bass groove and sensual vibe, it's an underrated Kravitz song that may not have been one of his biggest hits but it's still one of his best songs."

== Music video ==
The music video for the song was shot in Paris, France, in Kravitz' apartment, and directed by Anthony Mandler. Released in early September 2014, it features Dutch model Rianne ten Haken.

== Charts ==
=== Weekly charts ===
| Chart (2014–2015) | Peak position |
|---|---|
| Austria (Ö3 Austria Top 40) | 16 |
| Belgium (Ultratop 50 Flanders) | 16 |
| Belgium (Ultratop 50 Wallonia) | 8 |
| France (SNEP) | 11 |
| Germany (GfK) | 17 |
| Hungary (Rádiós Top 40) | 1 |
| Hungary (Single Top 40) | 2 |
| Italy (FIMI) | 6 |
| Italy Airplay (EarOne) | 1 |
| Japan Hot 100 (Billboard) | 21 |
| Mexico (Billboard Mexican Airplay) | 15 |
| Mexico Anglo (Monitor Latino) | 5 |
| Netherlands (Dutch Top 40) | 36 |
| Netherlands (Single Top 100) | 62 |
| Poland Airplay (ZPAV) | 6 |
| Slovenia (SloTop50) | 28 |
| Switzerland (Schweizer Hitparade) | 9 |

=== Year-end charts ===
| Chart (2014) | Position |
|---|---|
| Belgium (Ultratop Flanders) | 86 |
| Belgium (Ultratop Wallonia) | 98 |
| France (SNEP) | 93 |
| Hungary (Rádiós Top 40) | 16 |
| Hungary (Single Top 40) | 18 |
| Italy (FIMI) | 83 |
| Italy Airplay (EarOne) | 19 |
| Japan Adult Contemporary (Billboard) | 84 |
| Poland (ZPAV) | 35 |
| Switzerland (Schweizer Hitparade) | 50 |

| Chart (2015) | Position |
|---|---|
| Belgium (Ultratop Wallonia) | 60 |

== Certifications ==
| Region | Certification | Certified units/sales |
|---|---|---|
| Italy (FIMI) | Platinum | 30,000^{‡} |
^{‡} Sales+streaming figures based on certification alone.
