= Sex (Lenny Kravitz song) =

Single by Lenny Kravitz

from the album Strut
- Released: August 6, 2014
- Length: 3:55
- Label: Roxie
- Songwriters: Lenny Kravitz; Craig Ross
- Producer: Lenny Kravitz

Lenny Kravitz singles chronology
| "The Chamber" (2014) | "Sex" (2014) | "New York City" (2014) |

Music video
- "Sex" on YouTube

"Sex" is a song written and recorded by American singer Lenny Kravitz and Craig Ross. The song was released on August 6, 2014 as the second single from Kravitz's tenth studio album Strut.

== Background ==
Kravitz explained to Billboard, "This is one of my favorite tracks on the album. It was recorded with minimal instrumentation, guitar, bass and drums. The strength of the groove comes from the sparse production which creates space." To shoot the music video, Kravitz hired New York photographer and director Dikayl Rimmasch, who previously worked with Jay-Z and Beyoncé. The video is black-and-white and provocative: Kravitz performs the song surrounded by two topless female dancers, their hands hiding their breasts. The film crew is entirely made up of religious figures: the director is a priest, cinematographer a monk, lighting designer a good sister.

== Reception ==
Marcus Floyd of Renowned for Sound wrote, "The album's sophomore single 'Sex' begins the show with its gnarly, enthusiastic arrangement and Kravitz' vocals are as good as ever". Lanetra King of Rated R&B noted, "his soulful track 'Sex' inspired by the groovy disco decade of flared bottoms and high hair fros. Kravitz welcomes the new generation and reintroduces the old to the 80s with his vintage, timeless sound. This track is sure to have listeners itching to pull out their dance moves on the floor... From the looks of his artwork for his 'Sex' single and for his Strut album, Kravitz is sure to keep things hot and spicy for the new album."

== Charts ==
| Chart (2014) | Peak position |
|---|---|
| France (SNEP) | 107 |
| Hungary (Single Top 40) | 20 |
| Hungary (Stream Top 40) | 28 |
