= Black and White America (song) =

Single by Lenny Kravitz

from the album Black and White America
- Released: September 19, 2011
- Length: 4:35
- Label: Roadrunner, Loud & Proud
- Songwriters: Lenny Kravitz, Craig Ross
- Producer: Lenny Kravitz

Lenny Kravitz singles chronology
"Rock Star City Life" (2011)	"Black and White America" (2011)	"Push" (2011)

Music video
- Lenny Kravitz Black And White America (Official Video) on YouTube

"Black and White America" is a song recorded by American singer Lenny Kravitz and released on September 19, 2011, as the fourth single from his album of the same name.

== Background ==
Kravitz explained that the song name refers to "the insults endured by his interracial parents in the 1960s, making race the central theme of the album. Despite big ideas, he deftly keeps the mood shifting."

== Reception ==
Ryan Reed of Paste stated, "Many moments rank high on the Kravitz funkiness chart, including the fantastic title track—which rides liquidy slap-bass and buzzing synth, fleshed out by interjections from glistening strings and horns."

== Charts ==
Chart (2011)	Peak position
France (SNEP)	100
Netherlands (Single Top 100)	92
