= Push (Lenny Kravitz song) =

Single by Lenny Kravitz

from the album Black and White America
- Released: October 21, 2011
- Length: 4:23
- Label: Roadrunner, Loud & Proud
- Songwriter: Lenny Kravitz
- Producer: Lenny Kravitz

Lenny Kravitz singles chronology
"Black and White America" (2011)	"Push" (2011)	"Superlove" (2011)

Music video
- Lenny Kravitz - Push on YouTube

"Push" is a song recorded by the American singer Lenny Kravitz and released on October 21, 2011, as the fifth single from his album Black and White America. The song entered the radio rotation on that date and was made available for download in Italy, the United Kingdom, Canada, and the United States on November 5, 2011.

== Background ==
Eve Barlow of The Guardian noted, "Push is a Beatles-esque, horns-driven number about positivity in spite of hardship, inspired by his family’s struggles for acceptance." The song is a kind of piano-led and supported ballad. Instruments such as the organ and the woodwinds are used to give brightness and to create an almost religious atmosphere. The song was inspired by the 2009 movie Precious, which is based on the 1996 novel Push. It is a story of an illiterate African American girl who finds strength to rise above abuse to create a better life for her children. Kravitz himself played a nurse in the movie.

== Video ==
The black-and-white music video was shot by Mathieu Bittonand, made available on Kravitz's official YouTube channel on December 3, 2011. In the video, Kravitz is seen playing a piano at various venues during his concerts. These scenes include footage of Kravitz on his recent tour and other behind-the-scenes clips. In other scenes, he is filmed standing near the window of a hotel room, or in a camper, or in the audience of his concert. The video ends with a scene from the end of one of his concerts as he greets the audience with a bow along with his entire band.
