= Each one teach one =

African-American proverb

"Each one teach one" is an African-American proverb. It has been adopted as a motto by many organizations.

== Origin ==
The phrase originated in the United States during the time of slavery, when Africans were denied education, including learning to read. Many if not most enslaved people were kept in a state of ignorance about anything beyond their immediate circumstances which were under the control of owners, the lawmakers and authorities. When an enslaved person learned or was taught to read, it became their duty to teach someone else, spawning the phrase "Each one teach one".

== Usage ==
=== Africa ===
Many of the political prisoners on Robben Island, South Africa held during apartheid (1948–1991) were illiterate. Their mail was highly censored and reading materials limited. The inmates used the term, "each one, teach one" as a battle cry to ensure everyone in the movement was educated.

The phrase is used as a slogan in literacy campaigns in Nigeria.

=== Asia ===
In the first half of the 20th century, the phrase was applied to the work of a Christian missionary, Dr. Frank Laubach, who utilized the concept to help address poverty and illiteracy in the Philippines. Many sources cite Dr. Laubach as creating the saying, but many others believe that he simply used it in order to advance the cause of ending illiteracy in the world.

=== Europe ===
The phrase is the party slogan of the Communist Party of Great Britain (Marxist–Leninist). It is also the name of an organisation based in Berlin, promoting empowerment of Afro-European German citizens: Each One Teach One (association).

=== North America ===
The phrase has also been adopted by the Delancey Street Foundation, a nonprofit organization based in San Francisco that provides residential rehabilitation services and vocational training for people with history of substance abuse or criminal convictions. The organization incorporates the "each one, teach one" principle by having each client act as a mentor to successive clients in academic subjects and trades varying from masonry to catering. It is also the motto of the Dozenal Society of America, a non-profit advocating for the use of duodecimal in research and education.

=== In fiction ===
In the 1996 novel Push by Sapphire and the 2009 movie based on it, Precious, the expression is used as the name of an alternative school that the principal character is attending after being transferred out from public school.

=== In non-fiction ===
Each One Teach One was used as the title of a memoir by homeless activist Ronald Casanova. Published by Curbstone Press in 1996 and subtitled Up and Out of Poverty, Memoirs of a Street Activist, the book recounts Casanova's life as a New York City orphan, his youth in a series of detention centers, and ultimate success as an officer of the National Union of the Homeless, where he campaigned for low-income housing and greater federal and local assistance to the homeless and to squatters. Northwestern University Press announced the re-issue of the memoir scheduled for 2023.
