= Strut (album) =

Studio album by Lenny Kravitz
- Released: September 23, 2014
- Recorded: 2012–2014
- Studio: Gregory Town Sound
- Genre: Rock
- Length: 53:22
- Labels: Roxie Records, Kobalt
- Producer: Lenny Kravitz

Lenny Kravitz chronology
Black and White America (2011)	Strut (2014)	Raise Vibration (2018)

Singles from Strut
- 1. "The Chamber" Released: June 24, 2014; 2. "Sex" Released: August 6, 2014; 3. "New York City" Released: October 21, 2014; 4. "Dirty White Boots" Released: November 11, 2014; 5. "The Pleasure and the Pain" Released: June 26, 2015

Strut is the tenth studio album by American rock musician Lenny Kravitz. It was released on September 23, 2014, and was the first release on Kravitz's own Roxie Records, with distribution by Kobalt Label Services. The record also produced five singles released both in 2014 and 2015.

== Background ==
This album is his first one released by his own label Roxie Records—named after his mother, actress Roxie Roker. In an interview for Huffington Post Kravitz explained that the name Strut is "...about being proud and confident about who you are. Whatever you are. Because we're all different. We're all freaks of some sort. That whole thing about being "normal," I don't even know what that is. We're all different. That's the beauty of life. It's about embracing who you are, and walking tall and proud". He also mentioned that "the music itself is about love and relationships", "grit and glamour, all together", and "a lot of sensuality".

Kravitz wrote all the songs on the album, except for "Ooo Baby Baby" written by Smokey Robinson and Warren "Pete" Moore, and played various instruments as well. He decided to cover "Ooo Baby Baby" while filming The Hunger Games: Catching Fire where he played character Cinna, the stylist to Jennifer Lawrence's heroine. He heard it in a makeup trailer, and the song pleased him so much that he soon decided to include it as twelfth title for the new album. The lead single, "The Chamber", was released on June 24, 2014. The video is set in Paris, a city where Kravitz has been living on and off for the past nine years. In 2011, he was even awarded the France's highest cultural honour—Order of Arts and Letters.

== Critical reception ==
Professional ratings
Aggregate scores
Source	Rating
Metacritic	71/100
Review scores
Source	Rating
AllMusic	4.5/5 stars
Entertainment Weekly	B+
Now	3/5 stars
Mojo	2/5 stars
The Music	3/5 stars
The New Zealand Herald	3/5 stars
Otago Daily Times	2.5/5 stars
PopMatters	7/10
Renowned for Sound	3/5 stars
The Sydney Morning Herald	3/5 stars

At Metacritic, which assigns a weighted mean rating out of 100 to reviews from mainstream critics, the album received an average score of 71, based on five reviews, which indicates "generally favorable reviews". Strut was ranked No. 35 on Rolling Stone's 50 Best Albums of 2014 list: the song "New York City" was described as "the best tune Mick Jagger didn't get around to writing in his Studio 54 days".

Shane Gilchrist of Otago Daily Times stated "All his technical ability aside, Kravitz lingers a little too long in a comfortable late-night lounge, swaggering around a framework of riff-rock, reconstituted funk and dirty soul. In short, Strut offers no significant U-turns (unlike previous album Black and White America) nor does it stumble". Lisa Nash of Cryptic Rock mentioned "His albums are like a bag of pick and mix: full of variety, sweet to taste, and will make listeners remember their childhood with fondness. The tracks are generally radio and club friendly and will make people want to dance. The guitar riffs will please the Rock fans, while the Soul fans will love Kravitz’s distinctive voice. Strut is a very solid piece of work and, while not as strong as 2011’s Black and White America, will still please Kravitz’s dedicated followers".

Stephen Thomas Erlewine of AllMusic wrote "Kravitz deploys all his considerable sonic skills on songs that are purposefully trashy and unapologetically fun and the result is pure pleasure". A reviewer of Funkatopia said "The new album Strut from Lenny Kravitz seems like a culmination of raw rock and funk thrown into a blender... His talent and delivery are intense, but there's something here that seems like we’re looking at a puzzle that had some pieces left out. Maybe it's one of those albums that insist on multiple listens to truly embrace what's happening and maybe those awkward feelings are the subconscious identifying great songs".

== Track listing ==
All lyrics are written by Lenny Kravitz, except "Ooo Baby Baby" written by Smokey Robinson and Warren "Pete" Moore.

Strut track listing
No.	Title	Music	Length
1.	"Sex"	Kravitz, Craig Ross	3:55
2.	"The Chamber"	Kravitz, Ross	4:57
3.	"Dirty White Boots"	Kravitz, Ross	3:58
4.	"New York City"	Kravitz, Ross	6:23
5.	"The Pleasure and the Pain"	Kravitz	5:09
6.	"Strut"	Kravitz	3:10
7.	"Frankenstein"	Kravitz	4:35
8.	"She's a Beast"	Kravitz	4:43
9.	"I'm a Believer"	Kravitz, Ross	3:17
10.	"Happy Birthday"	Kravitz	4:57
11.	"I Never Want to Let You Down"	Kravitz	4:38
12.	"Ooo Baby Baby"	Smokey Robinson, Warren "Pete" Moore	3:40
Total length:			53:22

Target deluxe edition bonus tracks
No.	Title	Music	Length
13.	"Lift Me Out of My Head"	Kravitz	5:15
14.	"It Won't Feel the Same"	Kravitz	4:21

iTunes bonus tracks
No.	Title	Length
13.	"Sweet Gitchey Rose"	4:48
14.	"Can't Stop Thinkin' 'bout You"	3:43

== Personnel ==
Credits adapted from the album's liner notes, based on the Target edition track listing.

- Lenny Kravitz – lead vocals, bass, arrangements, production (all tracks); drums (tracks 1–13), background vocals (1–3, 9, 13, 14), hand claps (1, 4, 6, 7, 9, 11–13), Minimoog (1, 2), tambourine (1, 11), electric guitar (2, 3, 5, 6, 10), ARP String Ensemble (2, 4), wine glasses (2), electric guitar solo (3, 5, 10), wood blocks (4); Hammond B3, organ, glockenspiel (5); cowbell (6, 7), sandpaper (6); clavinet, harmonica, congas, Indian drum (7); gang vocals (9), piano (10), acoustic guitar (12, 13), beat box (13)
- Craig Ross – additional engineering (all tracks), electric guitar (1–5, 7–12), hand claps (1, 4, 6, 7, 9, 11, 13), electric guitar solo (6), acoustic guitar (8), gang vocals (9); electric rhythm guitar, electric slide guitar (13); acoustic 12-string guitar, slide guitars (14)
- Tom Edmonds – engineering
- Miguel Scott – engineering assistance
- Artie Smith – instrument technician
- Bob Clearmountain – mixing (all tracks), hand claps (2)
- Bob Ludwig – mastering
- Mia Ross – hand claps (1)
- Mali Hunter – hand claps (1)
- Tawatha Agee – backwards vocals (2), background vocals (4–7, 10–12)
- Dave Baron – synthesizer programming (2)
- Cindy Mizelle – background vocals (4–7, 10–12)
- James D-Train Williams – background vocals (4–7, 10–12)
- Harold Todd – saxophone (4, 5, 7, 10–13)
- Ludovic Louis – trumpet (4, 5, 7, 11, 12)
- Mathieu Bitton – hand claps (4, 9), gang vocals (9), art direction, design
- Woody Harrelson – hand claps (4, 9)
- Rodney Burns – hand claps (4, 9)
- Ryan Price – hand claps (4, 9)
- Tom Kartsotis – hand claps (4, 9)
- Kenyea Johnson – hand claps (4, 9)
- Darret Adkins – cello (8)
- David Bowlin – violin (8)
- Kenji Bunch – viola (8)
- Joe Manchisi – gang vocals (9)
- Terri Manchisi – gang vocals (9)
- Katrine Weiss – gang vocals (9)
- Julie Weiss – gang vocals (9)
- Mish Wasserman – gang vocals (9)
- Carleen Donovan – gang vocals (9)
- Ellen Wakayama – art direction
- Steven Wilson – "Strut" lettering

== Charts ==
=== Weekly charts ===
Weekly chart performance for Strut
Chart (2014)	Peak position
Australian Albums (ARIA)	31
Austrian Albums (Ö3 Austria)	3
Belgian Albums (Ultratop Flanders)	6
Belgian Albums (Ultratop Wallonia)	5
Canadian Albums (Billboard)	20
Danish Albums (Hitlisten)	13
Dutch Albums (Album Top 100)	7
Finnish Albums (Suomen virallinen lista)	6
French Albums (SNEP)	3
German Albums (Offizielle Top 100)	2
Hungarian Albums (MAHASZ)	5
Italian Albums (FIMI)	3
Japanese Albums (Oricon)	22
Scottish Albums (Official Charts)	31
Spanish Albums (Promusicae)	9
Norwegian Albums (VG-lista)	26
Polish Albums (ZPAV)	4
Portuguese Albums (AFP)	6
Swiss Albums (Schweizer Hitparade)	2
Swiss Albums (Romandy)	1
UK Albums (Official Charts)	21
US Billboard 200	19
US Independent Albums (Billboard)	3
US Top Rock Albums (Billboard)	6

=== Year-end charts ===
2014 year-end chart performance for Strut
Chart (2014)	Rank
Belgian Albums (Ultratop Flanders)	45
Belgian Albums (Ultratop Wallonia)	73
Dutch Albums Chart	100
French Albums Chart	65
German Albums Chart	83
Italian Albums Chart	70
Polish Albums Chart	29
Swiss Albums Chart	26

2015 year-end chart performance for Strut
Chart (2015)	Rank
Belgian Albums (Ultratop Flanders)	115
Belgian Albums (Ultratop Wallonia)	65
French Albums Chart	193
