= Rianne ten Haken =

Dutch model (born 1986)

Rianne Ten Haken
- Born: 27 November 1986 (age 39); Lelystad, Netherlands
- Modeling information
- Height: 5 ft 11 in (1.80 m)
- Hair color: Light Brown
- Eye color: Blue
- Agency: The Industry Model Management (New York); Elite Model Management (Paris, Copenhagen); Women Management (Milan); Select Model Management (London); VDM Model Management (Amsterdam); Traffic Models (Barcelona); Modellink (Gothenburg); Modelwerk (Hamburg); Louisa Models (Munich); MP Stockholm (Stockholm); Vivien's Model Management (Sydney)

Rianne ten Haken (born 27 November 1986) is a Dutch model. She was born to a Dutch father and a Belgian mother in Lelystad, Flevoland, and began modeling after she won the 2001 Elite Model Look competition at the age of 15.

In 2003, Rianne walked her first runways. In New York, she debuted at the Marc Jacobs show and was subsequently picked up by clients.

In December 2003 she landed her first major cover for Italian Vogue, photographed by Steven Meisel. That same month she also appeared on the cover of Numero photographed by Mert & Marcus.

Rianne has worked with several famous fashion photographers as Steven Meisel, Craig McDean, Patrick Demarchelier and Peter Lindbergh. She worked for magazines such as American, Italian and British Vogue, Numero, W and GQ. Recently, she landed back to back covers and fashion editorials in Vogue Italia for the October and November 2009 issues. In the 2010s she appeared on the covers of various magazines such as Vogue Netherlands, Elle Russia, Elle Spain, Elle Serbia and L'Officiel Netherlands.

Ten Haken was seen in advertising campaigns for companies such as Versace, Armani collezioni, Armani exchange and La Perla. She also featured in cosmetic campaigns for Versace, Chanel, Guerlain and Clarins.

As a runway model, Rianne has walked the catwalks for designers such as Calvin Klein, Jean Paul Gaultier, Dior, Chanel, Yves Saint Laurent, Gucci, Prada, Miu Miu, Marc Jacobs, Donna Karan, Diane von Furstenberg, Versace, Roberto Cavalli and many more.

In 2014 she appeared in the music video for Lenny Kravitz's song "The Chamber", the first single from his album Strut.

Rianne is represented by Women Model Management, Elite Model Management and Traffic.
