= The Pleasure and the Pain =

Single by Lenny Kravitz

from the album Strut
- Released: June 26, 2015
- Length: 5:09
- Label: Roxie
- Songwriter(s): Lenny Kravitz
- Producer(s): Lenny Kravitz

Lenny Kravitz singles chronology
"Dirty White Boots" (2014)	"The Pleasure and the Pain" (2015)	"It's Enough!" (2018)

Music video
- "The Pleasure and the Pain" on YouTube

"The Pleasure and the Pain" is a song written and recorded by American singer Lenny Kravitz. The song was released on June 26, 2015 as the fifth and final single from his tenth studio album Strut.

== Video and reception ==
The video was shot by director Dikayl Rimmasch who also worked with such singers as Beyoncé, Jay Z, and BigBang. Discussing the video, Rolling Stone wrote, "The clip revels in sun-dappled black-and-white footage of the musician and a beautiful female companion as they motorcycle, skinny-dip, party and of course rock their way across the country. But the road is also a figurative one: a path from romantic bliss to crushing heartbreak." Marcus Floyd of Renowned for Sound wrote that the song is a "smooth rendition with a great melody and a memorable guitar riff".

== Charts ==
Chart (2014)	Peak position
Austria (Ö3 Austria Top 40)	70
Belgium (Ultratip Bubbling Under Flanders)	40
Belgium (Ultratop 50 Wallonia)	36
France (SNEP)	60
Germany (GfK)	80
Switzerland (Schweizer Hitparade)	29
