= Violet & Daisy =

2011 American crime comedy-drama film

- Theatrical release poster
- Directed by: Geoffrey Fletcher
- Written by: Geoffrey Fletcher
- Produced by: Geoffrey Fletcher; Bonnie Timmermann
- Starring: Saoirse Ronan; Alexis Bledel; James Gandolfini; Danny Trejo; Marianne Jean-Baptiste
- Cinematography: Vanja Cernjul
- Edited by: Joe Klotz
- Music by: Paul Cantelon
- Production companies: Magic Violet; GreeneStreet Films
- Distributed by: Cinedigm Entertainment
- Release dates: September 15, 2011 (Toronto International Films Festival); June 7, 2013 (United States)
- Running time: 88 minutes
- Country: United States
- Language: English
- Budget: $8 million
- Box office: $108,139

Violet & Daisy is a 2011 American crime comedy-drama film written, produced, and directed by Geoffrey Fletcher in his directorial debut. The film stars Saoirse Ronan, Alexis Bledel, Danny Trejo, Marianne Jean-Baptiste, and James Gandolfini in one of his last acting roles before his death on June 19, 2013. Supporting roles are performed by John Ventimiglia, Danny Hoch, and Tatiana Maslany. Violet & Daisy follows two teenage assassins named Violet and Daisy who accept what they think will be a quick-and-easy job, until an unexpected target throws them off their plan.

Violet & Daisy was released on September 15, 2011, at the Toronto International Film Festival and was given a limited theatrical release on June 7, 2013. Geoffrey S. Fletcher credits Pulp Fiction, Superbad, and Thelma & Louise as inspiration for this film.

Violet & Daisy was also adapted for the stage and performed at The New School in 2019.

== Plot ==
Violet and Daisy are a pair of gum-chewing young assassins who casually snuff out crime figures in New York City, distracted only by the fact that a concert by their favorite pop idol Barbie Sunday has suddenly been canceled.

Determined to raise cash to buy a pair of the newest Barbie Sunday dresses, the duo takes on a new hit job offered to them by their handler Russ. The target is a mysterious unnamed loner who stole from rival boss, Donnie. A sudden and unexpected empathy after finding out about their quite unusual mark's pancreatic cancer and the estrangement from his daughter leads the two girls into an unexpected journey of self-examination, catapulting the junior enforcers into a world beyond their deadly routine, all while encountering dangerous foes such as rival boss Donnie's crew of hitmen and rapists or the legendary assassin simply known as Number 1, who's said to have once killed three ninjas with a fingernail file.

== Cast ==
- Saoirse Ronan as Daisy
- Alexis Bledel as Violet
- James Gandolfini as The Guy
- Marianne Jean-Baptiste as Number 1
- Danny Trejo as Russ
- Lynda Gravatt as Dolores
- Tatiana Maslany as April
- Cody Horn as Barbie Sunday
- John Ventimiglia as Man #1
- Stu "Large" Riley as Man #2
- Neville Archambault as Man #3
- Danny Hoch as Man #4
- Tuffy Questell as Kidnapped Man
- Nick Choksi as Desk Officer
- Gary Hope as Hardware Store Cashier
- Chris Columbo as Hardware Store Perp
- Bettye Fletcher as Doll Hospital Matron

== Production ==
Bruce Willis was considered for the role of The Guy before James Gandolfini was cast. Carey Mulligan was originally cast in the role of Violet but opted to do Drive instead, so she dropped out. She was replaced by Alexis Bledel.

Principal photography and filming mainly took place in New York City, New York.

According to a bankruptcy trustee overseeing the unwinding of Geoffrey's brother Alphonse Fletcher Jr.'s Fletcher Asset Management hedge fund, $8 million from the fund was used to finance the Violet & Daisy production.

== Release ==
The film first premiered at the Toronto International Films Festival on September 15, 2011, and received its first limited theatrical release on June 7, 2013, with its widest release being 17 theaters.

=== Home media ===
Violet & Daisy was released for home distribution on DVD and Blu-ray Disc on November 19, 2013, with the only special features being a theatrical trailer and a poster slideshow.

== Reception ==
=== Box office ===
In its opening weekend Violet & Daisy grossed $9,982. The film ended its theatrical run with a total domestic gross of $17,186. Internationally, the film grossed an additional $90,953 for a worldwide total of $108,139.

=== Critical reception ===
Violet & Daisy received generally negative reviews with many critics complaining that it was yet another Quentin Tarantino-type knock-off. The film garnered a 23% rating on Rotten Tomatoes based on 48 reviews. The website's critics consensus reads, "Arch and too cute by half, Violet & Daisy cycles through too many bad ideas to make use of Alexis Bledel and Saoirse Ronan's combined talents." Violet & Daisy received a 43 out of 100 on the website Metacritic.

Matt Zoller Seitz of RogerEbert.com gave the film 2 out of 4 stars, stating "Gandolfini's quietly magnificent performance is the only reason to see 'Violet & Daisy,' a thriller that might as well have been released in 1996, when everybody and their brother and their sister and their cousin twice-removed was trying to be Quentin Tarantino, writing screenplays about loquacious hit men and gangsters and molls delivering cutesy monologues in wacky, not-quite-real universes". A. O. Scott of The New York Times wrote, "We don't feel the weight and menace of death, nor the volatile emotions of youth, and have nothing to respond to beyond the spectacle of girls with guns". Christopher Campbell of Film School Rejects gave the movie a B− grade and wrote, "Hardly a follow-up that will have [Fletcher] garnering more awards. Not because it's bad; it's just really cartoony, as in artificial, two-dimensional and rather childish". Stephanie Merry of The Washington Post gave the film 2 out of 4 stars, stating, "The film's subtle visual allure is all but stamped out by the impression that the director tries too hard to be an idiosyncratic auteur in the vein of Quentin Tarantino".

In contrast, Cammila Collar of TV Guide gave the film 3 out of 4 stars, commenting "Violet & Daisy is a cool movie. It's strange and ambitious and affecting and extremely well-acted throughout a thoroughly esoteric script". Jeffrey M. Anderson of Common Sense Media gave the film 3 out of 5 stars stating "Though it can't keep up that kind of energy throughout, especially as it's set mostly in one room, it's charming enough – and short enough – that there are no hard feelings".
