= New York City (Lenny Kravitz song) =

Song by Lenny Kravitz

Single by Lenny Kravitz

from the album Strut
- Released: October 21, 2014
- Genre: Rock
- Length: 6:23
- Label: Roxie
- Songwriter(s): Lenny Kravitz; Craig Ross
- Producer(s): Lenny Kravitz

Lenny Kravitz singles chronology
"Sex" (2014)	"New York City" (2014)	"Dirty White Boots" (2014)

Music video
- "New York City" on YouTube

"New York City" is a song by American singer Lenny Kravitz, written by Kravitz and Craig Ross. The song was released on October 21, 2014, as the third single from the Kravitz's tenth studio album Strut.

== Video ==
The music video was shot by photographer and director Francesco Carrozzini. The video premiered exclusively via Vevo. In the video Kravitz walks around New York, from Harlem to Soho to Brooklyn to Coney Island—as his fans gather around him with their mobile phones.

== Reception ==
Marcus Floyd of Renowned for Sound wrote that "New York City" is "six minutes and twenty-three seconds of classic rock n' roll that's addictive".

== Charts ==
Chart performance for "New York City"
Chart (2014)	Peak position
Belgium (Ultratip Bubbling Under Flanders)	37
Belgium (Ultratop 50 Wallonia)	29
France (SNEP)	51
Switzerland (Schweizer Hitparade)	34
