= Precious (film) =

2009 film by Lee Daniels

Precious: Based on the Novel "Push" by Sapphire
- Theatrical release poster
- Directed by: Lee Daniels
- Screenplay by: Geoffrey S. Fletcher
- Based on: Push by Sapphire
- Produced by: Lee Daniels; Gary Magness; Sarah Siegel-Magness
- Starring: Mo'Nique; Paula Patton; Mariah Carey; Sherri Shepherd; Lenny Kravitz; Gabourey Sidibe
- Cinematography: Andrew Dunn
- Edited by: Joe Klotz
- Music by: Mario Grigorov
- Production companies: Lee Daniels Entertainment; Smokewood Entertainment
- Distributed by: Lionsgate
- Release dates: January 15, 2009 (Sundance); November 6, 2009 (United States)
- Running time: 110 minutes
- Country: United States
- Language: English
- Budget: $10 million
- Box office: $63.3 million

Precious: Based on the Novel "Push" by Sapphire, or simply Precious, is a 2009 American drama film directed and co produced by Lee Daniels. Its script was written by Geoffrey S. Fletcher, adapted from the 1996 novel Push by Sapphire. The film stars Gabourey Sidibe and Mo'Nique, alongside Paula Patton, Mariah Carey, Sherri Shepherd, and Lenny Kravitz. It marked the acting debut of Sidibe, who portrays a young woman struggling against poverty and abuse. Filming took place in New York City from October to December 2007.

Precious then without a distributor, premiered to acclaim at both the 2009 Sundance Film Festival and the 2009 Cannes Film Festival, under its original title of Push: Based on the Novel by Sapphire. At Sundance, it won the Audience Award and the Grand Jury Prize for best drama, as well as a Special Jury Prize for supporting actress Mo'Nique. After Precious' screening at Sundance in January 2009, Tyler Perry announced that he and Oprah Winfrey would be providing promotional assistance to the film, which was released through Lionsgate Entertainment. Precious won the People's Choice Award at the Toronto International Film Festival in September. The film's title was changed from Push to Precious: Based on the Novel Push by Sapphire, to avoid confusion with the 2009 action film Push.

Lionsgate gave the film a limited release in the United States on November 6, 2009, before expanding on November 20. Precious received positive reviews from critics; the performances of Sidibe and Mo'Nique, the story, and its message were highly praised. The film was also a box office success, earning over $63 million on a $10 million budget. It received six nominations at the 82nd Academy Awards, including Best Picture, Best Director, and Best Actress for Sidibe. Mo'Nique won the award for Best Supporting Actress, while Geoffrey Fletcher won for Best Adapted Screenplay, becoming the first African-American to win a screenplay award at the Oscars.

== Plot ==
In 1987, 16-year-old Claireece Precious Jones lives in New York City's Harlem neighborhood with her unemployed mother, Mary, who subjects her to constant physical, sexual, and verbal abuse. Precious has also been raped by her now-absent father, Carl, resulting in two pregnancies. The family resides in a Section 8 tenement and survives on welfare checks. Precious often finds a way out of her traumatic daily life by escaping into daydreams in which she is loved and appreciated.

Precious's first child, a daughter named "Mongo", short for Mongoloid, has Down syndrome and is being cared for by Precious's grandmother, though Mary forces the family to pretend that Mongo lives with her and Precious during social worker visits so she can receive extra welfare money from the government. When Precious's second pregnancy is discovered, her junior high principal, Mrs. Lichtenstein, arranges for her to attend an alternative school program called Each One Teach One, where she hopes Precious can change her life's direction.

Despite her mother's insistence that Precious apply for welfare, Precious goes to the alternative school and enrolls. She meets her new teacher, Ms. Blu Rain, as well as several other girls who all come from troubled backgrounds and are looking to get their GED to advance their educations. Precious's life begins to turn around when she slowly starts to learn to read and write with the help of Ms. Rain and finds herself inspired by her. While she learns, she starts to meet with social worker Ms. Weiss, who learns about the sexual assault in the household when Precious accidentally reveals who fathered her children. One day, while telling a story in class, Precious's water breaks, and she is rushed to the hospital. She gives birth to a healthy son named Abdul and is acquainted with a kind nursing assistant named John McFadden. While in the hospital, Precious writes letters to Ms. Rain through her notebook that is taken to and from her by Joann, one of the girls in her class.

Once discharged from the hospital, Precious returns home to find Mary waiting for her. Mary asks to hold Abdul, but deliberately drops him before furiously attacking Precious, as Precious's revelation about the abuse has resulted in the termination of welfare payments. Precious fights off Mary, retrieves Abdul, and after falling down the stairs and narrowly avoiding Mary dropping her television on them from the top of the stairwell, flees and eventually breaks into her school classroom for shelter. When Ms. Rain discovers Precious and Abdul sleeping the next morning, she frantically calls local shelters in search of a safe place for Precious and Abdul to live, but they end up staying with Ms. Rain and her live-in girlfriend for the holiday. The next morning, Ms. Rain takes Precious and Abdul to find assistance, and Precious is able to continue her schooling while raising Abdul in a halfway house.

Mary returns to inform Precious of her father's death from AIDS. Precious later learns that she is HIV-positive, though Abdul is not. Feeling dejected, Precious distracts Ms. Weiss and steals her case file from her office. As she shares the details of her file with her fellow students, she begins to hope for the future. Later, Precious meets with her mother, who brings Mongo to Ms. Weiss's office. Ms. Weiss confronts Mary about her and Carl's abuse of Precious, going back to when Precious was a toddler. Mary tearfully confesses that she always hated Precious for "stealing her man" by "letting him" abuse her and for eventually "making him leave", and that she allowed the abuse to continue because she wanted "someone to love her". Precious tells Mary that she finally sees her for who she really is and severs ties with her, leaving with both Mongo and Abdul and telling her mother she will never see her or her children again. Mary begs Ms. Weiss to retrieve her daughter and grandchildren, but a shaken and disgusted Ms. Weiss silently rejects her and walks away, leaving Mary distraught.

Planning to complete a GED test to receive a high-school diploma equivalency, followed by college, Precious walks into the city with her children, ready to start a new life with a brighter future.

== Cast ==
- Gabourey Sidibe as Claireece "Precious" Jones. The film's casting director, Billy Hopkins, found her at an open-call audition held at New York City's Lehman College. Sidibe was chosen over 300 others who auditioned in nationwide casting calls and had no prior acting experience.
- Mo'Nique as Mary Lee Johnston, Precious' unemployed, profane, and abusive mother. Mo'Nique and Daniels had previously worked together in Shadowboxer (in which Mo'Nique's character was named Precious).
- Paula Patton as Blu Rain, Precious's alternative-school teacher. Patton said that her character teaches Precious to "learn and read and write from the very beginnings, and pushes her to believe in herself, and pushes her to realize that anything is possible." She is a lesbian.
- Mariah Carey as Ms. Anna Weiss, a social worker who supports Precious during her struggles. In September 2008, Carey described her character as "not really a likable person, but she does bring this to the surface." Carey and Daniels had previously worked together on Tennessee. Daniels said that he cast Carey because he was "so impressed" by her performance in Tennessee. According to director Daniels, Helen Mirren, who starred in his previous film Shadowboxer, was originally set to play the part of Ms. Weiss, but obtained a role in a "bigger project."
- Sherri Shepherd as Lisa "Cornrows", the receptionist at Each One Teach One.
- Lenny Kravitz as John McFadden, a nurse who shows kindness to Precious. This film is Kravitz's feature film acting debut. Later in 2011, he released the song "Push", inspired by the novel and movie.
- Nealla Gordon as Mrs. Sondra Lichtenstein, Precious's school principal who sends her to Each One Teach One.
- Stephanie Andujar as Rita Romero, a 16-year-old former heroin addict and prostitute, who attends the same alternative school in Harlem as Precious and later befriends her. During Andujar's audition, Daniels was so impressed that he interrupted her dialogue and stated, "I want you in my movie."
- Chyna Layne as Rhonda Patrice Johnson, Precious's Jamaican-American classmate, who is religious.
- Amina Robinson as Jermaine Hicks, Precious's classmate, who hits on Ms. Rain during the first day.
- Xosha Roquemore as Jo Ann Rogers, Precious's classmate who aspires to be a record producer
- Aunt Dot as Betty "Toosie" Johnston, Mary's mother and Precious's grandmother, who fails to intervene Mary's abuse. Aunt Dot is the real-life aunt of director Lee Daniels.
- Angelic Zambrana as Consuelo Montenegro, a girl who attends the same alternative school as Precious and gets into a fight with her after calling her fat, but later befriends her.
- Quishay Powell as Mongo, Precious's daughter, who has Down syndrome.
- Grace Hightower as Ms. Turner, the Social Worker who visits Precious's family.
- Kimberly Russell as Katherine, Ms. Rain's partner.
- Bill Sage as Mr. Wicher, Precious's math teacher.
- Ramona "Sapphire" Lofton (the author of the novel) makes a cameo appearance as a woman at a daycare center near the film's end.
- Jamie Foxx as Frank Mason (deleted cameo).
- Rodney 'Bear' Jackson as Carl Kenwood Jones, the incestuous father and rapist of Precious, who sexually abuses and impregnates her.

== Production ==
=== Development ===
Daniels had said that he was attracted to the novel based on how "raw and honest" it felt. In an interview with AMC, he noted that reading the book brought back a memory from his childhood of a young abused girl who knocked on his family's door, claiming that her mom was going to kill her. Daniels recalls that the incident was the first time he saw his mother frightened, specifically noting the helplessness of the situation, and stating "she knew that she'd have to send this little girl home, and that was what disturbed her — that she couldn't save her. She tried to make it easier for her. That's all she could do." In creating the movie, Daniels hoped that the experience would be cathartic and that "maybe I could heal. And maybe I could heal other people, too." Another stated goal Daniels had was to challenge the general public's perception of incest.

The film was co-produced by Daniels's company, Lee Daniels Entertainment, and the Sarah Siegel-Magness and Gary Magness-owned Smokewood Entertainment Group. The two production companies had previously collaborated with Daniels on Tennessee (2008). Precious had, in total, thirteen producers: Daniels, Oprah Winfrey, Tom Heller, Tyler Perry, Lisa Cortés, Gary Magness, Valerie Hoffman, Asger Hussain, Mark G. Mathis, Andrew Sforzini, Bergen Swason, Simone Sheffield and Sarah Siegel-Magness. Initially, Daniels did not expect the movie to generate much buzz, expecting the movie to go straight to video, stating "That it made it to the big screen says there was an angel looking after me."

=== Filming ===
Principal photography began on October 24, 2007 and concluded on November 24, 2007. It took place on location in various parts of New York City. Despite the dark subject matter, Sidibe has stated that the mood on the set was lighthearted, that "Every day was a party" and that the cast would frequently sing and tell jokes to "lighten the atmosphere." The production budget was $10 million.

=== Post-production ===
After Precious was screened at the 2009 Sundance Film Festival in January, it was picked up for distribution by Lions Gate Entertainment and received promotional assistance from Oprah Winfrey's Harpo Productions and Tyler Perry's 34th Street Films. Precious was the first theatrical film to be affiliated with Perry's company. In February 2009, Lionsgate and The Weinstein Company filed lawsuits contesting ownership of the rights to release Precious. Both companies claim that they had purchased distribution rights to Precious: The Weinstein Company claimed that they had "secured" their rights while Lionsgate stated that they owned the rights to the film's distribution in North America. Precious's sales agent Cinetic Media denied Weinstein's claims, stating that they failed to finalize the deal.

== Music ==
The soundtrack accompanying the film featured a compilation of original songs and covers with artists such as LaBelle (a pop group composed of Nona Hendryx, Sarah Dash, and Patti LaBelle), Donna Allen, Jean Carn, Sunny Gale, MFSB, Grace Hightower, Queen Latifah and Mahalia Jackson. Mary J. Blige's co-wrote and performed the original song "I Can See in Color" which was separately released as a single. Blige's Matriarch Records and Geffen Records along with Lionsgate released the soundtrack online as a digital download on November 3, 2009, and in stores on November 24. The album received positive praise; mainly the song "I Can See in Color".

== Release ==
=== Marketing ===
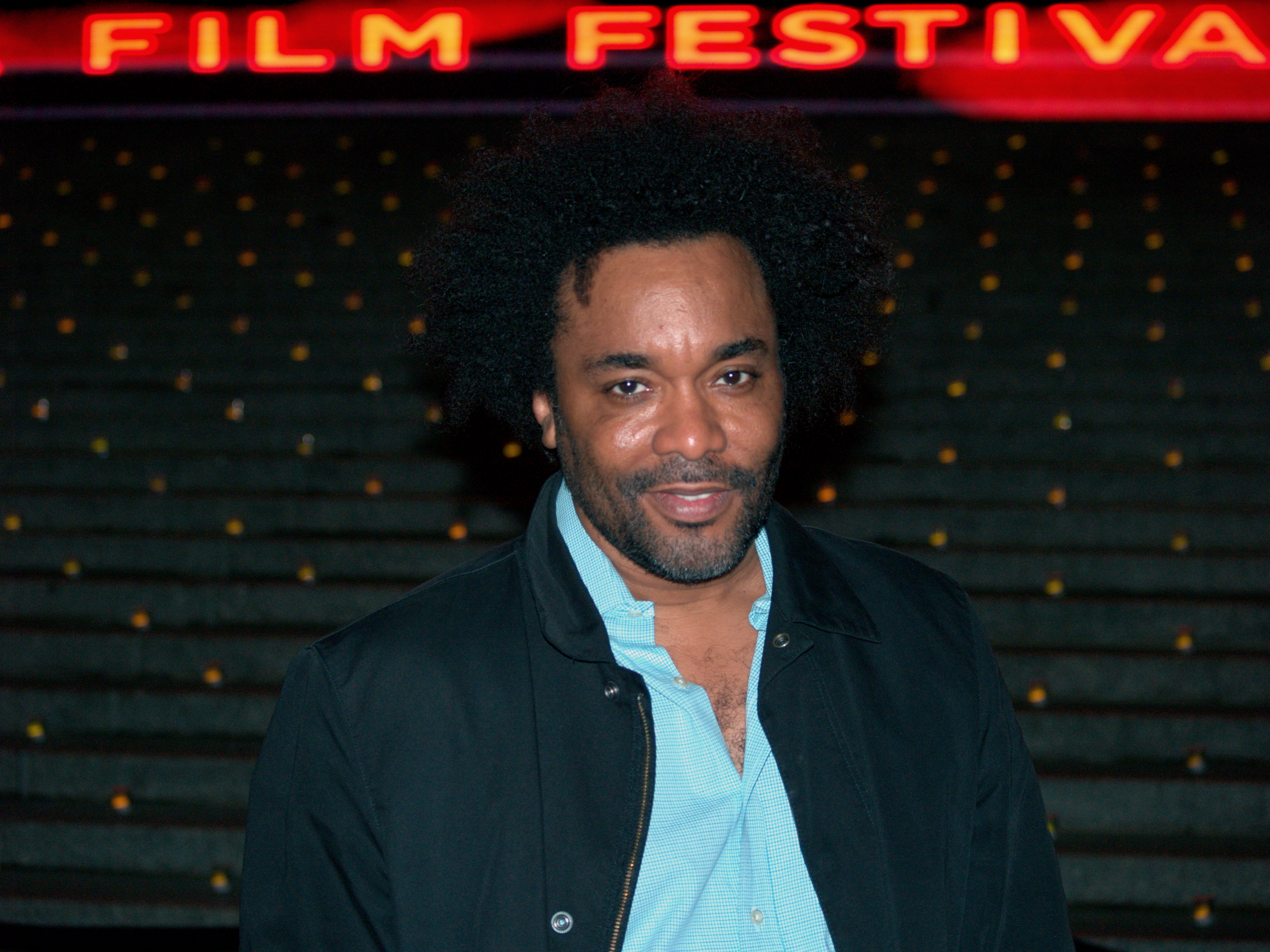
The film's director, Lee Daniels, stated that he was initially "embarrassed" to screen Precious at the Cannes Film Festival because he felt that it would show African Americans in a negative light, due to its content.

Precious was screened during the 2009 Sundance Film Festival from January 15, 2009, until January 25 in Park City, Utah. At Sundance, Precious was originally listed under the title Push: Based on the Novel by Sapphire; the title was later modified to avoid confusion with another 2009 film entitled Push. Precious appeared in the Un Certain Regard, an award section recognising unique and innovative films, at the 62nd Cannes Film Festival in May 2009. At Cannes, the film received a fifteen-minute standing ovation from the audience after the film was screened.

Daniels commented that, at first he was "embarrassed" to show Precious at Cannes because he did not want "to exploit black people" and wasn't sure if he "wanted white French people to see our world". After the success at Precious's screenings at Sundance, reporters took note that the film could mirror the success of other films that had been screened and praised at the festival. S. James Snyder, of Time, compared Precious's success at Sundance to that of 2008's The Wrestler and Slumdog Millionaire; both films later were nominated for multiple Academy Awards, and Slumdog itself won Best Picture at the 81st Annual Academy Awards.

Winfrey used her status as both a celebrity and a media personality to give the film what was described by Ben Child of The Guardian, as a "high-profile promotional push." At a press conference Winfrey announced her intention to lead a promotional campaign on behalf of Precious along with her other various platforms, hoping to be able to "bring in different audiences" by promoting the film on her show, in her magazine and on her satellite-radio channel. Katie Walmsley of CNN remarked, based on the film's positive reception at the Toronto Film Festival, that the film "at the very least, the [Toronto] award will guarantee "Precious" substantial distribution, as well as exposure for two-time director Daniels." The trailer for Precious was shown during previews of the film's producer Perry's film I Can Do Bad All by Myself in September 2009.

=== Box office ===
Precious was given a limited-theatrical release on November 6, 2009, and was originally scheduled to appear on screens only in North America. During its opening weekend, the film earned $1,872,458, which placed twelfth on that weekend's box office list, despite being in only 18 theaters. The film saw a 214 percent increase in its second week of release, earning $5,874,628 at 174 theaters, which catapulted it up to third place in that weekend's box office, with a per-theater average of $33,762. On November 20, 2009, the film received a wider release, showing at 629 theaters (thus tripling the number of theaters showing the film). In its third week, Precious, as studios had previously estimated, placed sixth at the box office, with the revenues estimated $11,008,000—an 87.4% increase from the previous week.

After riding that three-week wave of success, Precious began to see a decrease in box office earnings. Brandon Grey of Box Office Mojo described Precious as having had a "robust expansion" in its second week of release, and he confirmed that the film holds the record for having the second-highest grossing weekend for a movie playing at fewer than 200 sites, behind only Paranormal Activity. Precious grossed a total of $40,320,285 in over six weeks of release. The film opened at ninth place in the United Kingdom, with revenues totaling £259,000 in its opening weekend from a limited release of 47 cinemas, generating a £5,552 screen average.

=== Home media ===
The film was released on DVD-Video and Blu-ray Disc formats on March 9, 2010, reaching number one on the top DVD sales chart in the United States with 1.5 million DVDs sold in its first week of release. It also reached the top position on the rental charts for iTunes and Amazon.com.

== Reception ==
=== Critical response ===
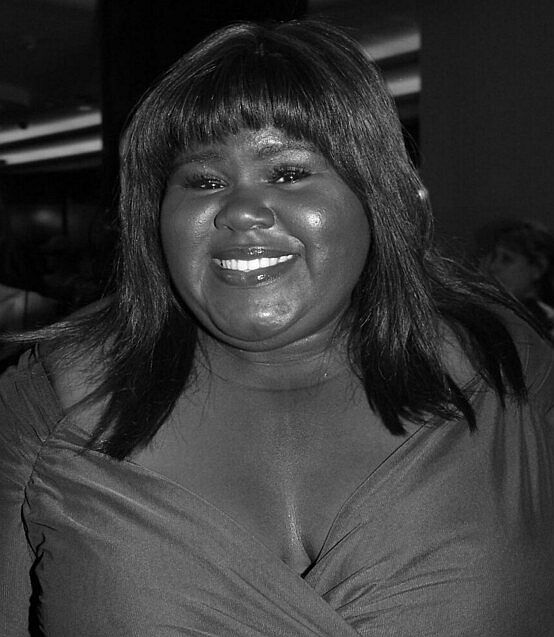
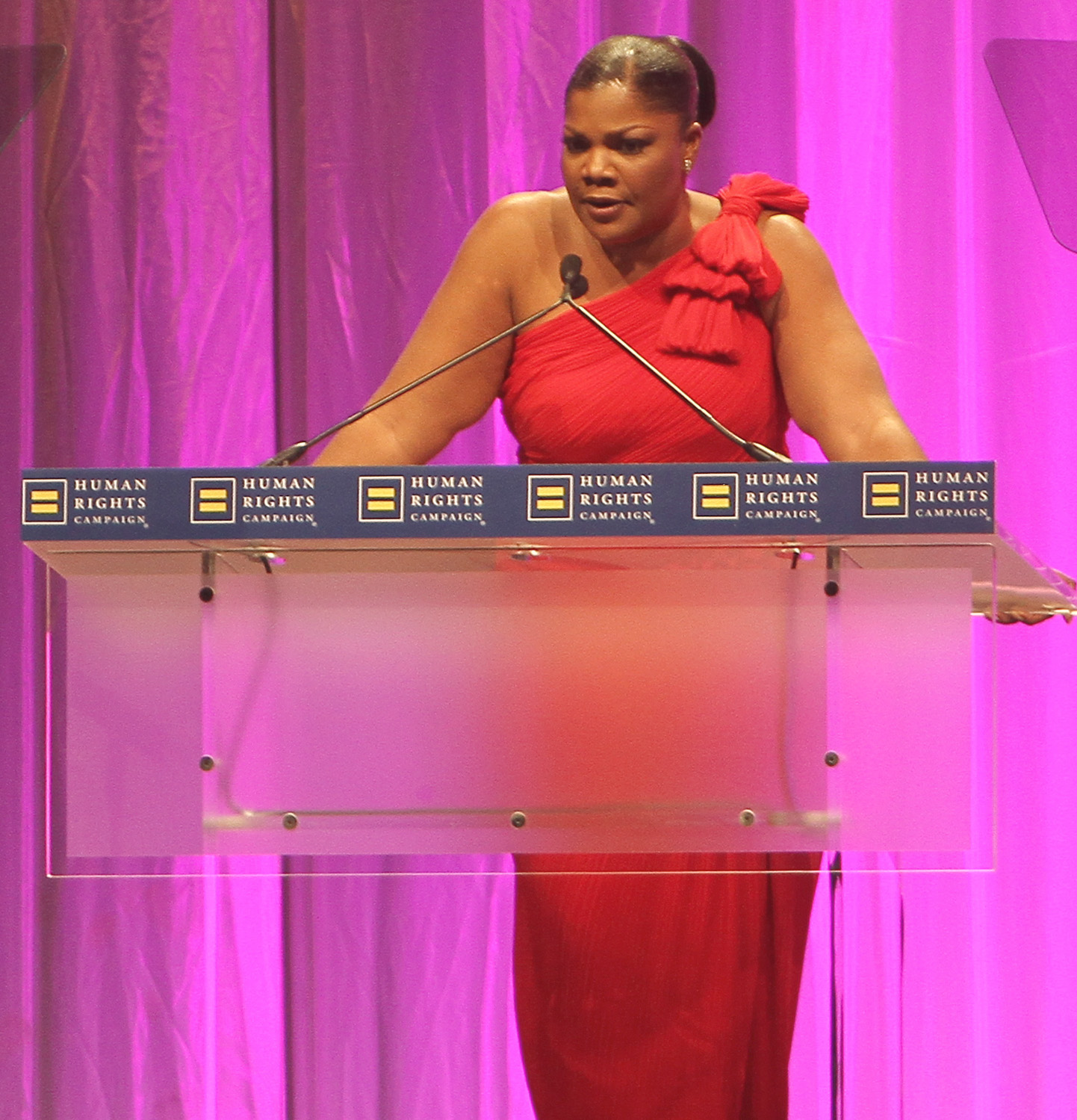
The performances of Gabourey Sidibe and Mo'Nique garnered critical acclaim, earning them Academy Award nominations for Best Actress and Best Supporting Actress respectively, with Mo'Nique winning her category.

On the review aggregator website Rotten Tomatoes, 92% of 239 critics' reviews are positive. The website's consensus reads: "Precious is a grim yet ultimately triumphant film about abuse and inner-city life, largely bolstered by exceptional performances from its cast." Metacritic, which uses a weighted average, assigned the film a score of 78 out of 100, based on 36 critics, indicating "generally favorable" reviews.

John Anderson of Variety said "to simply call it harrowing or unsparing doesn't quite cut it," having felt that the film is "courageous and uncompromising, a shaken cocktail of debasement and elation, despair and hope." Anderson cited Carey's performance as "pitch perfect" and Patton's role as Ms. Blu Rain as "disarming."

Owen Gleiberman of Entertainment Weekly praised Carey's performance, describing it as having "an authentically deglammed compassion" and praised the film for capturing "how a lost girl rouses herself from the dead" and for Daniels showing "unflinching courage as a filmmaker by going this deep into the pathologies that may still linger in the closets of some impoverished inner-city lives." Gleiberman described the film as being a movie "that makes you think, 'There but for the grace of God go I.' [...] It's a potent and moving experience, because by the end you feel you've witnessed nothing less than the birth of a soul", and felt that the "final scene of revelation" between Sidibe's and Mo'Nique's characters was strong enough to be able to leave viewers "tearful, shaken, [and] dazed with pity and terror." He identified how Daniels uses one of the rich scenes created by Fletcher to position Mo'Nique in a painful confrontation with Sidibe that results in a masterful and thought-provoking performance that delivers the final "push" needed by Sidibe: "The more Precious tries to get away from her mother, the more she's pulled back".

Roger Ebert of the Chicago Sun-Times praised Mo'Nique and Sidibe's performances. Ebert described Mo'Nique's performance as being "frighteningly convincing" and felt that "the film is a tribute to Sidibe's ability to engage our empathy" because she "completely creates the Precious character." He noted that Carey and Patton "are equal with Sidibe in screen impact." Ebert praised Daniels because, rather than casting the actors for their names, "he was able to see beneath the surface and trust that they had within the emotional resources to play these women, and he was right."

Betsy Sharkey, of the Los Angeles Times described the film as being a "rough-cut diamond... [A] rare blend of pure entertainment and dark social commentary, it is a shockingly raw, surprisingly irreverent and absolutely unforgettable story." Claudia Puig of USA Today said that while there are "melodramatic moments" in the film, the cast gives "remarkable performances" to show audiences the film's "inspiring message." Peter Travers, of Rolling Stone called Mo'Nique "dynamite," a performance that "tears at your heart."

Mary Pols of Time praised the film's fantasy sequences for being able to show the audience a "joyous Wizard of Oz energy" that is able to "open the door into Precious's mind in a way even [the author] Sapphire couldn't." Pols felt that, while not implying that the film has "a lack of compelling emotional material" but that the film's "few weak moments" are the "ones that dovetail with typical inspirational stories." Marshall Fine of The Huffington Post praised the film as being "a film that doesn't shy away from the depths to which human beings can sink, but it also shows the strength and resilience of which we are capable, even at our lowest moments."

Scott Mendelson, also of The Huffington Post, felt that when you put the "glaring issues aside," the film "still works as a potent character study and a glimpse inside a world we'd rather pretend does not exist in America." But while the film "succeeds as a powerful acting treat and a potent character study, there are some major narrative issues that prevent the film from being an accidental masterpiece." Mendelson described the film as being "an acting powerhouse" based on its many emotional themes.

Critic Jack Mathews wrote: "Without being familiar with the source material, you really have no idea how much work went into the adaptation or how well it was done.... 'Precious: Based on the Novel 'Push' by Sapphire'... First-time screenwriter Geoffrey Fletcher did yeoman's work turning Sapphire's graphic, idiomatic novel into a coherent and inspiring story about the journey of an abused Harlem teenager."

Erin Aubry Kaplan wrote on Salon.com that the question posed by the film is how to assess the "hopeless story of a ghetto teen... in the Age of Obama." She went on to say that "'Precious' proves you don't always have to choose between artistic and commercial success; the film's first opening weekend was record-breaking. It's a sign how much we needed to tell this story. And, perhaps, how many stories there are left to tell."

A. O. Scott identified the script's precise use of force and adept use of language, including a memorable line created by Fletcher for the adaptation: a "risky, remarkable film adaptation, written by Geoffrey Fletcher, the facts of Precious's life are also laid out with unsparing force (though not in overly graphic detail). But just as Push achieves an eloquence that makes it far more than a fictional diary of extreme dysfunction, so too does Precious avoid the traps of well-meaning, preachy lower-depths realism. It howls and stammers, but it also sings...Inarticulate and emotionally shut down, her massive body at once a prison and a hiding place, Precious is also perceptive and shrewd, possessed of talents visible only to those who bother to look. At its plainest and most persuasive, her story is that of a writer discovering a voice. 'These people talked like TV stations I didn't even watch,' she remarks of Ms. Rain and her partner (Kimberly Russell), displaying her awakening literary intelligence even as she marvels at the discovery of her ignorance."

Conversely, reflecting the transformation from script to screen, Dana Stevens of Slate disagreed with Gleiberman's suggestion that the "film makes you think" and argued that the film's "eagerness" to "drag" the audience "through the lower depths of human experience" leaves little space for independent "conclusions". Stevens noted that, while the film is about improvement and self-actualization, "it wields an awfully large cudgel", in contrast to Scott's view of balance: "unsparing force (though not in overly graphic detail)". Perhaps sharing Mathews's view regarding the daunting challenge of adapting the harsh story of Push, Stevens observed that "Daniels and Fletcher no doubt intended for their film to lend a voice to the kind of protagonist too often excluded from American movie screens: a poor, black, overweight single mother from the inner city."

Precious also received some negative responses from critics. Writing for the New York Press, Armond White compared the film to the landmark but controversial The Birth of a Nation (1915) as "demeaning the idea of black American life," calling it "an orgy of prurience" and the "con job of the year." He further characterized the source novel as a relic of 1990s identity politics and noted that the film "casts light-skinned actors as kind [...] and dark-skinned actors as terrors." In two separate articles, writers for The New York Times cited White's article as the most powerful negative review of Precious, adding that in a 2009 interview he had remarked that the film's popularity is a result of the "fact" that "black pathology sells."

Courtland Milloy of The Washington Post said Precious was "a film of prurient interest that has about as much redeeming social value as a porn flick." David Edelstein, of New York Magazine commented that, while the film has "elements" that are "powerful and shocking," he felt the movie was "programmed", and that the film had "its own study guide." Keith Uhlich of Time Out New York felt that the film did not live up to its "long hype", and felt that it was "bewildering" to discover the film's praise at the Sundance Film Festival, because Uhlich characterized the film as having "shrug-worthiness."

Peter Bradshaw wrote in The Guardian that the film catalogues a "horrendous, unending nightmare of abuse" and then abruptly turns into something resembling the 1980s musical Fame. Bradshaw commended the film's acting and energy, but said it was not quite the "transcendent masterpiece" some had made it out to be. Sukhdev Sandhu wrote in The Daily Telegraph that he found the film "a dispiriting mix of cliché and melodrama," although he acknowledged that Precious does feature some superb acting.

Noting Daniels's admiration of the work of John Waters and Pedro Almodóvar and the joking attitude he and the actors sometimes took towards their material while making the movie, Jim Emerson argued that Precious is best understood as a deliberately over-the-top piece of camp in the vein of Waters's Female Trouble.

=== Accolades ===
Precious received dozens of nominations in award categories, including six Academy Award nominations, not only for the film itself but for the cast's performances, the direction and cinematography, and the adaptation of the novel to the screenplay. Director Lee Daniels won the People's Choice Award, an award given by audience members at the 2009 Toronto International Film Festival. Daniels won both awards for which he was nominated at the San Sebastián International Film Festival—the TVE Otra Mirada Award and the Audience Award. He was also nominated in the category of Bronze Horse at the Stockholm Film Festival, and won the Best Feature Film Award at the Hawaii International Film Festival.

Precious received five awards at the 2009 Independent Spirit Awards (ISA) in the categories for Best Film, Best First Screenplay, Best Direction, Best Actress and Best Supporting Actress.

Precious received nominations from the 67th Golden Globes for the film and for Mo'Nique and Sidibe; Mo'Nique won Best Supporting Actress.

The film was nominated in all three major categories at the 2009 Screen Actor Guild Awards: Best Cast, Best Actress, and Best Supporting Actress (in which Mo'Nique won).

Precious was considered for the BAFTA awards in several categories, including Best Picture, Best Director, Best Adapted Screenplay, Best Editing, Best Leading Actress (Sidibe), and Best Supporting Actress (Mo'Nique).

On February 2, 2010, the film received Academy Award nominations at the Academy Awards for Best Picture, Best Actress (Sidibe), Best Supporting Actress (Mo'Nique), Best Director (Daniels), Best Adapted Screenplay (Fletcher), and Best Film Editing (Klotz). On March 7, 2010, Mo'Nique and Fletcher won Academy Awards in their respective categories. The film was also nominated for a GLAAD Media Award for "Outstanding Film – Wide Release" during the 21st GLAAD Media Awards.

== See also ==
- Cinema of the United States
- List of American films of 2009

Awards
Preceded by Frozen River	Sundance Grand Jury Prize: U.S. Dramatic; 2009	Succeeded by Winter's Bone
