= Push (novel) =

1996 novel by Sapphire

- Author: Sapphire
- Cover artist: Archie Ferguson
- Language: English
- Genre: Fiction
- Publisher: Alfred A. Knopf
- Publication date: 11 June 1996
- Publication place: United States
- Media type: Print (hardback, paperback)
- Pages: 177 (story until p.140, then extra content)
- ISBN: 978-0-679-76675-9

Push is the debut novel of American author Sapphire. Thirteen years after its release in 1996, the novel was made into the 2009 film Precious, which won numerous accolades, including two Academy Awards.

== Plot ==
In 1987, Claireece Precious Jones is an obese, illiterate 16-year-old girl who lives in Harlem, New York, with her abusive mother Mary. Precious is a few months pregnant with her second child, the product of her father Carl raping her. He is also the father of her first child (who has Down syndrome). When her school discovers the pregnancy, it is decided that she should attend an alternative school. Precious is furious, but the counselor later visits her home and convinces her to enter an alternative school, located in the Hotel Theresa, called Higher Education Alternative Each One Teach One.

Precious enrolls in the school, despite her mother's insistence that she apply for welfare. She meets her teacher, Ms. Blu Rain, and fellow students Rhonda, Jermaine, Rita, Jo Ann, and Consuelo. All of the girls come from troubled backgrounds. Ms. Rain's class is a pre-GED class for young women who are below an eighth-grade level in reading and writing, and are therefore unprepared for high school-level courses. They start off by learning the basics of phonics and vocabulary building. Despite their academic deficits, Ms. Rain ignites a passion in her students for literature and writing. Believing the only way to learn to write is to write every day, Ms. Rain requires each girl to keep a journal. She then reads their entries and provides feedback and advice. By the time the novel ends, the women have created an anthology of autobiographical stories called "LIFE STORIES – Our Class Book" appended to the book. The works of classic African-American writers such as Audre Lorde, Alice Walker, and Langston Hughes are inspirational for the students. Precious is particularly moved by Walker's The Color Purple.

While in the hospital giving birth to her son Abdul Jamal Louis Jones, Precious tells a social worker that her first child is living with her grandmother. This confession leads to Precious's mother having her welfare taken away. When Precious returns home with the newborn Abdul, her enraged mother chases her out of the house. Homeless and alone, she first passes a night at the armory, then turns to Ms. Rain, who uses all of her resources to get Precious into a halfway house with childcare. Her new environment provides her with the stability and support to continue school. The narrative prose, told from Precious's voice, continually improves in terms of grammar and spelling and is even peppered with imagery and similes. Precious has taken up poetry and is eventually awarded the mayor's office's literacy award for outstanding progress. The accomplishment boosts her spirits.

As her attitude changes and her confidence grows, Precious thinks about having a boyfriend and a real relationship with someone near her age who attracts her interest. Her only sexual experience thus far has been rape and sexual abuse by her mother and father. As she tries to move beyond her traumatic childhood and distance herself from her parents, her mother announces that her father has died from AIDS. Testing verifies that Precious is also HIV-positive, but her children are not. Her classmate Rita encourages Precious to join a support group and an HIV-positive group. The meetings provide a source of support and friendship for Precious and the revelation that her color and socioeconomic background did not necessarily cause her abuse. Women of all ages and backgrounds attend the meetings. The book concludes with no specific fate outlined for Precious; the author leaves her future undetermined.

== Style ==
Critics have gone in both directions with their opinions of the style in which Push is written. Some consider "the harrowing story line [to be] exaggerated," saying that it does not seem realistic to "saddle one fictional character with so many problems straight from today's headlines" (Glenn). Others have stated that while the dialect is problematic, Precious herself is believable because she "speaks in a darting stream of consciousness of her days in an unexpectedly evocative fashion" (Mahoney).

Scholarly analysis has interpreted Precious's relationship with Ms. Rain and her classmates as an alternative form of family outside traditional heteronormative structures.

=== Dialect/voice ===
Precious begins the novel functionally illiterate. She spells words phonetically. She uses a "minimal English that defies the conventions of spelling and usage and dispenses all verbal decorum" (Mahoney). She employs variations such as "nuffin'" for nothing, "git" for get, "borned" for born, "wif" for with, and "chile" for child. She also uses an array of profanity and harsh details that reflect the life she has experienced. Michiko Kakutani, a book reviewer for The New York Times, states that Precious' "voice conjures up [her] gritty unforgiving world."

My hand slip down in the dishwater, grab the butcher knife. She bedda not hit me, I ain' lyin'! If she hit me I will stab her ass to def, you hear me! (Push, p. 13)

As the book progresses and Precious learns to read and write, there is a stark change in her voice, though the dialect remains the same.

Last week we went to the museum. A whole whale is hanging from the ceiling. Bigger than big! Ok, have you seen a Volkswagen car that's like a bug? Um huh, you know what I'm talking about. That's how big the heart of a blue whale is. I know it's not possible, but if that heart in me could I love more? Ms Rain, Rita, Abdul? (Push, p. 138)

== Sequel ==
In 2011, Sapphire published a sequel, The Kid. It follows the life of Precious's son Abdul from the age of nine to 19.

== Censorship ==
In 2022, Push was listed among 52 books banned by the Alpine School District following the implementation of Utah law H.B. 374, “Sensitive Materials In Schools." Many of the books were removed because they were considered to contain pornographic material according to a new law.

== See also ==
- Precious, the film adaptation
- "Push", a song by Lenny Kravitz

== Sources ==
- Bennett, Tegan. "Sapphire shapes a gem that is Precious". The Sydney Morning Herald, 18 January 1997, late edn: 12.
- Freeman-Greene, Suzy. "Hard beat of Harlem; Books". The Age, 21 September 1996, late edn: 7.
- Harmon, William, et al. A Handbook to Literature. 9th edn. NJ: Prentice Hall, 2003.
- Harrell, Shante’ L. D.; Leticia M. Guice; Nanette Ray (2004). "Ramona Lofton (Sapphire)" (PDF). Voices from the Gaps. University of Minnesota.
- Kakutani, Michiko (14 June 1996). "BOOK OF THE TIMES; A Cruel World, Endless Until a Teacher Steps In". The New York Times (late ed.). p. 29.
- Powers, William. "Sapphire's Raw Gem; Some Say Her Novel Exploits Suffering. She Says They're Reading It All Wrong". The Washington Post, 6 August 1996: B1.
