= Sapphire (author) =

American author and performance poet

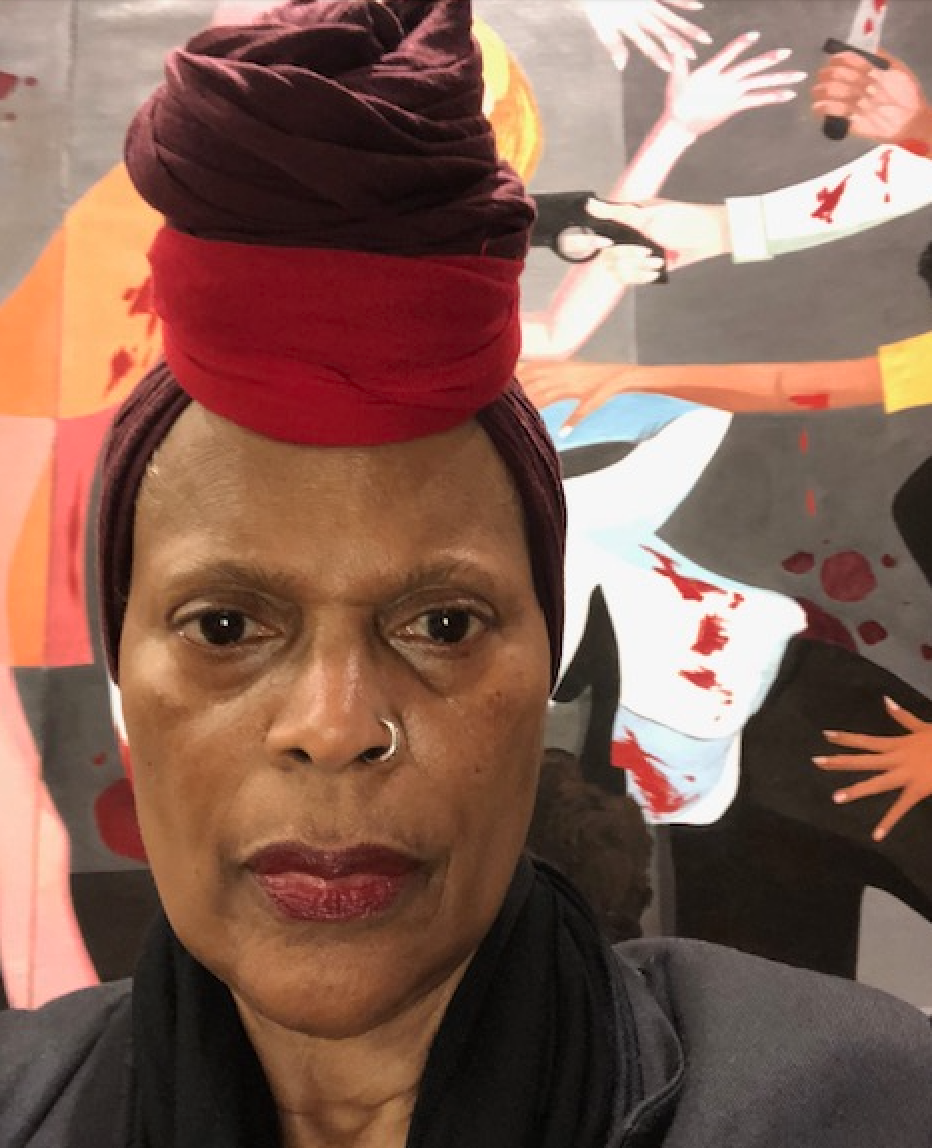
- Sapphire in New York City, 2021
- Born: Ramona Lofton; 1950 (age 75–76); Fort Ord, California, U.S.
- Education: City College of San Francisco; City College of New York (BA); Brooklyn College (MFA)
- Occupations: Author and performance poet
- Notable work: Push (1996)

Ramona Lofton (born August 4, 1950) better known by her pen name Sapphire, is an American author and performance poet.

== Early life ==
Ramona Lofton was born in Fort Ord, California, one of four children of an Army couple who relocated within the United States and abroad. After a disagreement concerning where the family would settle, her parents separated, with Lofton's mother "kind of abandoning them".

Lofton dropped out of high school and moved to San Francisco, where she attained a GED and enrolled at the City College of San Francisco before dropping out to become a "hippie". In the mid-1970s Lofton attended the City College of New York and obtained an MFA degree at Brooklyn College. Lofton held various jobs before starting her writing career, working as a performance artist as well as a teacher of reading and writing.

== Career ==
Lofton moved to New York City in 1977 and became heavily involved with poetry. She also became a member of a gay organization named United Lesbians of Color for Change Inc. She wrote, performed and eventually published her poetry during the height of the Slam Poetry movement in New York. Lofton took the name "Sapphire" because of its one-time cultural association with the image of a "belligerent Black woman," and also because she said she could more easily picture that name on a book cover than her birth name.

Sapphire self-published the collection of poems Meditations on the Rainbow in 1987. As Cheryl Clarke notes, Sapphire's 1994 book of poems, American Dreams, is often erroneously referred to as her first book. One critic referred to it as "one of the strongest debut collections of the 1990s".

Her first novel, Push, was unpublished before being discovered by literary agent Charlotte Sheedy, whose interest created demand and eventually led to a bidding war. Sapphire submitted the first 100 pages of Push to a publisher auction in 1995 and the highest bidder offered her $500,000 to finish the novel. The book was published in 1996 by Vintage Publishing and has since sold hundreds of thousands of copies. Sapphire noted in an interview with William Powers that "she noticed Push for sale in one of the Penn Station bookstores, and that moment it struck her she was no longer a creature of the tiny world of art magazines and homeless shelters from which she came". The novel brought Sapphire praise and much controversy for its graphic account of a young woman growing up in a cycle of incest and abuse.

A film based on her novel premiered at the Sundance Film Festival in January 2009. It was renamed Precious to avoid confusion with the 2009 action film Push. The cast included Gabourey Sidibe, Mo'Nique, who won the Academy Award for her portrayal of Precious' mother Mary, Mariah Carey, and Lenny Kravitz. Sapphire herself appears briefly in the film as a daycare worker.

In 2011, she released The Kid, a sequel to Push about Precious's son, Abdul. Sapphire admitted that part of the reason she decided to continue the story was because of the encouragement and interest Push received in scholarly conversations.

Sapphire's writing was the subject of an academic symposium at Arizona State University in 2007. In 2009 she was the recipient of a Fellow Award in Literature from United States Artists.

Sapphire has focused on bringing to light the parts of life that do not receive attention. In her words:

A major focus of my art has been my determination to reconnect to the mainstream of human life a segment of humanity that has been cast off and made invisible. I have brought into the public gaze women who have been marginalized by sexual abuse, poverty, and their blackness. Through art I have sought to center them in the world.

Sapphire's work is included in the 2019 anthology New Daughters of Africa, edited by Margaret Busby.

== Personal life ==
Sapphire lives in New York City. She is bisexual. Like her character Precious, Sapphire was sexually abused at the age of eight by her father.

== Works ==
Novels

- Push (1996)
- The Kid (2011)

Poetry

- Meditations on the Rainbow: Poetry (1987)
- American Dreams (1994)
- Black Wings & Blind Angels: Poems (1999)
