= George Blum =

French-American architect (1870–1928)

George Blum (born France; 1870–1928) was an architect raised in the United States. He later returned with his brother, Edward Blum, to France, and studied at the École des Beaux-Arts in Paris. Afterwards, the Blum brothers formed an architectural firm, George & Edward Blum, in New York City during the early 20th century. Their company designed some of New York City's most elegant and creative buildings.
