= Edward Blum (architect) =

French-American architect (1867–1944)

Edward Blum (1867–1944) was an architect born in Paris, who, with his brother George, designed apartment and office buildings, most of which are in New York City.

Blum received his degree in architecture from Columbia University in 1899. Edward and George studied at the École des Beaux-Arts in Paris. They are known for their Art Nouveau and Art Deco apartment houses, examples of which include the Phaeton, The Rockfall, The Admaston, The Dallieu, The Gramercy House, The Adlon, and The Gramont.

Christopher Gray of the New York Times wrote that the "buildings do everything differently... They treat the surface of the building almost like a textile, a rich continuous surface. They avoid any detail found in the traditional classical vocabulary. They use mosaic tile, art tile, very elongated Roman brick and sinuous panels of terra cotta. Their copperwork, for store trim or entrance canopies, is richly worked, like the cover of a medieval manuscript. Their ironwork cannot be found in any catalogue."

Edward Blum died in Sunnyside, Queens, New York, aged 77.
