= List of accolades received by Up in the Air =

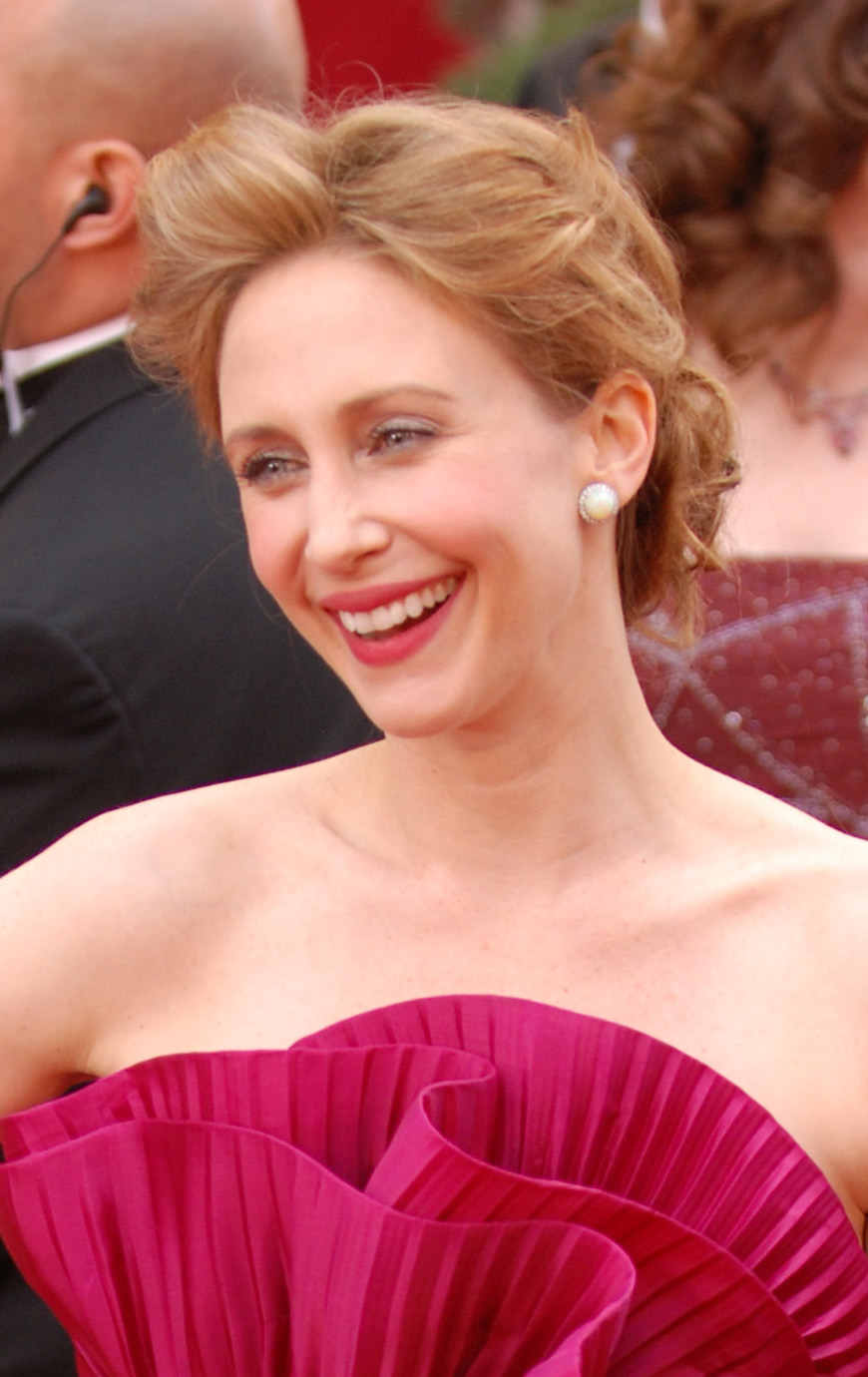
- Vera Farmiga, Best Actress in a Supporting Role nominee for Up in the Air at the 82nd Academy Awards
Awards and nominations
Award	Wins	Nominations
Academy Awards	0	6
British Academy Film Awards	1	6
Directors Guild of America Awards	0	1
Golden Globe Awards	1	6
Producers Guild of America Awards	0	1
Screen Actors Guild Awards	0	3
Writers Guild of America Awards	1	1

Totals (Note: Certain award groups do not simply award one winner. They acknowledge several different recipients, have runners-up, and have third place. Since this is a specific recognition and is different from losing an award, runner-up mentions are considered wins in this award tally. For simplification and to avoid errors, each award in this list has been presumed to have had a prior nomination.)
- Wins: 45
- Nominations: 117

Up in the Air is a 2009 American comedy-drama film directed by Jason Reitman and co-written by Reitman and Sheldon Turner. The film is an adaptation of the eponymous 2001 novel by Walter Kirn. Up in the Air was screened as a "sneak preview" at the Telluride Film Festival on September 6, 2009, before its world premiere at the Toronto International Film Festival on September 12, 2009. Up in the Air was released in the United States on December 4, 2009; playing on 15 screens in its first weekend, it grossed over $1.1 million. The film opened nationwide on December 23, 2009, earning over $11 million its first weekend in wide release. The film earned $79 million over 18 weeks in the United States and Canada, with an additional $83 million in overseas markets.

Up in the Air garnered various awards and nominations, with the nominations in categories ranging from recognition of the film itself to its screenplay, direction and editing, to the performance of the three primary actors – George Clooney, Vera Farmiga, and Anna Kendrick. The film received six Academy Award nominations with Farmiga and Kendrick both receiving nominations for Best Supporting Actress, though the film failed to win any of the awards. At the 63rd British Academy Film Awards, Up in the Air won one award – Best Adapted Screenplay, awarded to Reitman and Turner – out of the five for which it was nominated. The Dallas-Fort Worth Film Critics Association named Up in the Air Best Picture and awarded Reitman Best Director and Best Screenplay with Turner. Clooney was given the award for Best Actor. The film also received five nominations at the 67th Golden Globe Awards, with Reitman and Turner taking the award for Best Screenplay. Reitman and Turner also received recognition for the film's screenplay from the Writers Guild of America, where they won the Best Adapted Screenplay award. They received a subsequent twenty more awards and twenty-four nominations overall.

The film garnered five nominations from the Satellite Awards, with Rolfe Kent, the film's score composer, winning the Best Original Score award. Clooney, Farmiga and Kendrick were each nominated for an award at the 16th Screen Actors Guild Awards, but ultimately lost out. Kendrick earned an MTV Movie Award for Best Breakthrough Performance and the Rising Star Award from Palm Springs International Film Festival for her role in the film. Up in the Air won Best Film from eleven awards ceremonies, including the Florida Film Critics Circle, and Vancouver Film Critics Circle. The film earned four nominations for Best Cast from the Broadcast Film Critics Association, and the Washington D.C. Area Film Critics Association, respectively. Costume designer Danny Glicker was nominated for his work by the Costume Designers Guild in the Contemporary Film category. In addition, the film was included on lists of the ten best films of 2009 by Roger Ebert, the American Film Institute, and The New York Times.

== Accolades ==
Award	Date of ceremony	Category	Recipients	Result
Academy Award	March 7, 2010	Best Picture	Daniel Dubiecki, Ivan Reitman and Jason Reitman	Nominated
Academy Award	March 7, 2010	Best Director	Jason Reitman	Nominated
Academy Award	March 7, 2010	Best Actor	George Clooney	Nominated
Academy Award	March 7, 2010	Best Supporting Actress	Vera Farmiga	Nominated
Academy Award	March 7, 2010	Best Supporting Actress	Anna Kendrick	Nominated
Academy Award	March 7, 2010	Best Adapted Screenplay	Jason Reitman and Sheldon Turner	Nominated
American Cinema Editors	February 14, 2010	Best Edited Feature Film	Dana E. Glauberman	Nominated
Art Directors Guild	February 13, 2010	Best Production Design For A Contemporary Film	Steve Saklad	Nominated
Austin Film Critics Association	December 15, 2009	Best Adapted Screenplay	Jason Reitman and Sheldon Turner	Won
Austin Film Critics Association	December 15, 2009	Best Supporting Actress	Anna Kendrick	Won
Austin Film Festival	October 29, 2009	Out of Competition Audience Award	Up in the Air	Won
British Academy Film Awards	February 21, 2010	Best Film	Daniel Dubiecki, Ivan Reitman and Jason Reitman	Nominated
British Academy Film Awards	February 21, 2010	Best Adapted Screenplay	Jason Reitman and Sheldon Turner	Won
British Academy Film Awards	February 21, 2010	Best Actor	George Clooney	Nominated
British Academy Film Awards	February 21, 2010	Best Supporting Actress	Vera Farmiga	Nominated
British Academy Film Awards	February 21, 2010	Best Supporting Actress	Anna Kendrick	Nominated
British Academy Film Awards	February 21, 2010	Best Editing	Dana E. Glauberman	Nominated
Broadcast Film Critics	January 15, 2010	Best Picture	Up in the Air	Nominated
Broadcast Film Critics	January 15, 2010	Best Director	Jason Reitman	Nominated
Broadcast Film Critics	January 15, 2010	Best Adapted Screenplay	Jason Reitman and Sheldon Turner	Won
Broadcast Film Critics	January 15, 2010	Best Actor	George Clooney	Nominated
Broadcast Film Critics	January 15, 2010	Best Supporting Actress	Vera Farmiga	Nominated
Broadcast Film Critics	January 15, 2010	Best Supporting Actress	Anna Kendrick	Nominated
Broadcast Film Critics	January 15, 2010	Best Acting Ensemble	Up in the Air	Nominated
Broadcast Film Critics	January 15, 2010	Best Editor	Dana E. Glauberman	Nominated
Chicago Film Critics Association	December 21, 2009	Best Picture	Up in the Air	Nominated
Chicago Film Critics Association	December 21, 2009	Best Director	Jason Reitman	Nominated
Chicago Film Critics Association	December 21, 2009	Best Adapted Screenplay	Jason Reitman and Sheldon Turner	Won
Chicago Film Critics Association	December 21, 2009	Best Actor	George Clooney	Nominated
Chicago Film Critics Association	December 21, 2009	Best Supporting Actress	Vera Farmiga	Nominated
Chicago Film Critics Association	December 21, 2009	Best Supporting Actress	Anna Kendrick	Nominated
Costume Designers Guild	February 25, 2010	Best Costume Design – Contemporary Film	Danny Glicker	Nominated
Dallas-Fort Worth Film Critics Association	December 16, 2009	Best Picture	Up in the Air	Won
Dallas-Fort Worth Film Critics Association	December 16, 2009	Best Director	Jason Reitman	Won
Dallas-Fort Worth Film Critics Association	December 16, 2009	Best Screenplay	Jason Reitman and Sheldon Turner	Won
Dallas-Fort Worth Film Critics Association	December 16, 2009	Best Actor	George Clooney	Won
Dallas-Fort Worth Film Critics Association	December 16, 2009	Best Supporting Actress	Vera Farmiga	Nominated
Dallas-Fort Worth Film Critics Association	December 16, 2009	Best Supporting Actress	Anna Kendrick	Nominated
Detroit Film Critics Society	December 11, 2009	Best Film	Up in the Air	Nominated
Detroit Film Critics Society	December 11, 2009	Best Director	Jason Reitman	Nominated
Detroit Film Critics Society	December 11, 2009	Best Actor	George Clooney	Nominated
Detroit Film Critics Society	December 11, 2009	Best Supporting Actress	Vera Farmiga	Nominated
Detroit Film Critics Society	December 11, 2009	Best Supporting Actress	Anna Kendrick	Nominated
Detroit Film Critics Society	December 11, 2009	Breakthrough Performance	Anna Kendrick	Nominated
Directors Guild of America Awards	January 30, 2010	Outstanding Directorial Achievement in Motion Pictures	Jason Reitman	Nominated
Empire Awards	March 28, 2010	Best Comedy	Up in the Air	Nominated
Empire Awards	March 28, 2010	Best Newcomer	Anna Kendrick	Nominated
Florida Film Critics Circle	December 21, 2009	Best Film	Up in the Air	Won
Florida Film Critics Circle	December 21, 2009	Best Director	Jason Reitman	Won
Florida Film Critics Circle	December 21, 2009	Best Actor	George Clooney	Won
Golden Globe Awards	January 17, 2010	Best Drama Film	Up in the Air	Nominated
Golden Globe Awards	January 17, 2010	Best Director	Jason Reitman	Nominated
Golden Globe Awards	January 17, 2010	Best Screenplay	Jason Reitman and Sheldon Turner	Won
Golden Globe Awards	January 17, 2010	Best Actor	George Clooney	Nominated
Golden Globe Awards	January 17, 2010	Best Supporting Actress	Vera Farmiga	Nominated
Golden Globe Awards	January 17, 2010	Best Supporting Actress	Anna Kendrick	Nominated
Houston Film Critics Society	December 19, 2009	Best Picture	Up in the Air	Nominated
Houston Film Critics Society	December 19, 2009	Best Director	Jason Reitman	Nominated
Houston Film Critics Society	December 19, 2009	Best Screenplay	Jason Reitman and Sheldon Turner	Won
Houston Film Critics Society	December 19, 2009	Best Actor	George Clooney	Won
Houston Film Critics Society	December 19, 2009	Best Supporting Actress	Vera Farmiga	Nominated
Houston Film Critics Society	December 19, 2009	Best Supporting Actress	Anna Kendrick	Won
Irish Film and Television Awards	February 20, 2010	Best International Actress	Anna Kendrick	Won
London Film Critics' Circle	February 18, 2010	Film of the Year	Up in the Air	Nominated
London Film Critics' Circle	February 18, 2010	Director of the Year	Jason Reitman	Nominated
London Film Critics' Circle	February 18, 2010	Actor of the Year	George Clooney	Nominated
London Film Critics' Circle	February 18, 2010	Actress of the Year	Vera Farmiga	Nominated
Los Angeles Film Critics Association	December 14, 2009	Best Film	Up in the Air	Nominated
Los Angeles Film Critics Association	December 14, 2009	Best Screenplay	Jason Reitman and Sheldon Turner	Won
Los Angeles Film Critics Association	December 14, 2009	Best Supporting Actress	Anna Kendrick	Nominated
MTV Movie Awards	June 6, 2010	Best Breakthrough Performance	Anna Kendrick	Won
National Board of Review	January 12, 2010	Best Film	Up in the Air	Won
National Board of Review	January 12, 2010	Best Adapted Screenplay	Jason Reitman and Sheldon Turner	Won
National Board of Review	January 12, 2010	Best Actor	George Clooney	Won
National Board of Review	January 12, 2010	Best Supporting Actress	Anna Kendrick	Won
New York Film Critics	December 14, 2009	Best Film	Up in the Air	Nominated
New York Film Critics	December 14, 2009	Best Screenplay	Jason Reitman and Sheldon Turner	Nominated
New York Film Critics	December 14, 2009	Best Actor	George Clooney	Won
New York Film Critics	December 14, 2009	Best Supporting Actress	Vera Farmiga	Nominated
New York Film Critics	December 14, 2009	Best Supporting Actress	Anna Kendrick	Nominated
Palm Springs International Film Festival	January 7, 2010	Director of the Year	Jason Reitman	Won
Palm Springs International Film Festival	January 7, 2010	Rising Star Award	Anna Kendrick	Won
Producers Guild of America Awards	January 24, 2010	Theatrical Motion Picture	Daniel Dubiecki, Ivan Reitman and Jason Reitman	Nominated
Satellite Awards	December 20, 2009	Best Musical or Comedy Film	Up in the Air	Nominated
Satellite Awards	December 20, 2009	Best Adapted Screenplay	Jason Reitman and Sheldon Turner	Nominated
Satellite Awards	December 20, 2009	Best Original Score	Rolfe Kent	Won
Satellite Awards	December 20, 2009	Best Actor	George Clooney	Nominated
Satellite Awards	December 20, 2009	Best Supporting Actress	Anna Kendrick	Nominated
Screen Actors Guild Awards	January 23, 2010	Outstanding Performance by a Male Actor in a Leading Role	George Clooney	Nominated
Screen Actors Guild Awards	January 23, 2010	Outstanding Performance by a Female Actor in a Supporting Role	Vera Farmiga	Nominated
Screen Actors Guild Awards	January 23, 2010	Outstanding Performance by a Female Actor in a Supporting Role	Anna Kendrick	Nominated
St. Louis Gateway Film Critics Association	December 21, 2009	Best Film	Up in the Air	Won
St. Louis Gateway Film Critics Association	December 21, 2009	Best Director	Jason Reitman	Nominated
St. Louis Gateway Film Critics Association	December 21, 2009	Best Screenplay	Jason Reitman and Sheldon Turner	Nominated
St. Louis Gateway Film Critics Association	December 21, 2009	Best Actor	George Clooney	Won
St. Louis Gateway Film Critics Association	December 21, 2009	Best Supporting Actress	Vera Farmiga	Nominated
St. Louis Gateway Film Critics Association	December 21, 2009	Best Supporting Actress	Anna Kendrick	Nominated
Toronto Film Critics Association	December 16, 2009	Best Adapted Screenplay	Jason Reitman and Sheldon Turner	Won
Toronto Film Critics Association	December 16, 2009	Best Actor	George Clooney	Nominated
Toronto Film Critics Association	December 16, 2009	Best Supporting Actress	Vera Farmiga	Nominated
Toronto Film Critics Association	December 16, 2009	Best Supporting Actress	Anna Kendrick	Won
USC Scripter Award	February 6, 2010	Best Script	Jason Reitman, Sheldon Turner and Walter Kirn	Won
Vancouver Film Critics Circle	January 13, 2010	Best Film	Up in the Air	Won
Vancouver Film Critics Circle	January 13, 2010	Best Director	Jason Reitman	Nominated
Vancouver Film Critics Circle	January 13, 2010	Best Screenplay	Jason Reitman and Sheldon Turner	Won
Vancouver Film Critics Circle	January 13, 2010	Best Actor	George Clooney	Nominated
Vancouver Film Critics Circle	January 13, 2010	Best Supporting Actress	Vera Farmiga	Won
Vancouver Film Critics Circle	January 13, 2010	Best Supporting Actress	Anna Kendrick	Nominated
Washington D.C. Area Film Critics	December 7, 2009	Best Film	Up in the Air	Won
Washington D.C. Area Film Critics	December 7, 2009	Best Adapted Screenplay	Jason Reitman and Sheldon Turner	Won
Washington D.C. Area Film Critics	December 7, 2009	Best Director	Jason Reitman	Nominated
Washington D.C. Area Film Critics	December 7, 2009	Best Actor	George Clooney	Won
Washington D.C. Area Film Critics	December 7, 2009	Best Supporting Actress	Vera Farmiga	Nominated
Washington D.C. Area Film Critics	December 7, 2009	Best Supporting Actress	Anna Kendrick	Nominated
Washington D.C. Area Film Critics	December 7, 2009	Best Breakthrough Performance	Anna Kendrick	Nominated
Washington D.C. Area Film Critics	December 7, 2009	Best Ensemble	Up in the Air	Nominated
Writers Guild of America Award	February 20, 2010	Best Adapted Screenplay	Jason Reitman and Sheldon Turner	Won
