= Blood Will Out =

Blood Will Out may refer to:

- A Diagnosis: Murder episode
- A Midsomer Murders episode
- Blood Will Out (memoir) is a non-fiction work by Walter Kirn about his friendship with Christian Gerhartsreiter, AKA Clark Rockefeller
