= National Board of Review Award for Best Adapted Screenplay =

Annual US film award

The National Board of Review Award for Best Adapted Screenplay is an annual award given (since 2003) by the National Board of Review of Motion Pictures. The years in the table indicate the evaluated films years; the award ceremonies took place in the following year.

== Winners ==
=== 2000s ===
Best Screenplay

Year	Winner	Writer(s)	Source material	Ref.
2000	All the Pretty Horses	Ted Tally	novel by Cormac McCarthy	
2001	In the Bedroom	Rob Festinger and Todd Field	short story by Andre Dubus	
2002	Adaptation; Confessions of a Dangerous Mind; Human Nature	Charlie Kaufman	book by Susan Orlean novel by Chuck Barris (Original Screenplay)	

Best Adapted Screenplay

Year	Winner	Writer(s)	Source material	Ref.
2003	Cold Mountain	Anthony Minghella	novel by Charles Frazier	
2004	Sideways	Alexander Payne and Jim Taylor	novel by Rex Pickett	
2005	Syriana	Stephen Gaghan	book by Robert Baer	
2006	The Painted Veil	Ron Nyswaner	novel by W. Somerset Maugham	
2007	No Country for Old Men	Joel Coen and Ethan Coen	novel by Cormac McCarthy	
2008	The Curious Case of Benjamin Button	Eric Roth	short story by F. Scott Fitzgerald	
2008	Slumdog Millionaire	Simon Beaufoy	novel by Vikas Swarup	
2009	Up in the Air	Jason Reitman and Sheldon Turner	novel by Walter Kirn	

=== 2010s ===
Year	Winner	Writer(s)	Source material	Ref.
2010	The Social Network	Aaron Sorkin	book by Ben Mezrich	
2011	The Descendants	Alexander Payne, Nat Faxon, and Jim Rash	novel by Kaui Hart Hemmings	
2012	Silver Linings Playbook	David O. Russell	novel by Matthew Quick	
2013	The Wolf of Wall Street	Terence Winter	book by Jordan Belfort	
2014	Inherent Vice	Paul Thomas Anderson	novel by Thomas Pynchon	
2015	The Martian	Drew Goddard	novel by Andy Weir	
2016	Silence	Jay Cocks and Martin Scorsese	novel by Shūsaku Endō	
2017	The Disaster Artist	Scott Neustadter and Michael H. Weber	book by Greg Sestero and Tom Bissell	
2018	If Beale Street Could Talk	Barry Jenkins	novel by James Baldwin	
2019	The Irishman	Steven Zaillian	book by Charles Brandt	

=== 2020s ===
Year	Winner	Writer(s)	Source material	Ref.
2020	News of the World	Paul Greengrass and Luke Davies	novel by Paulette Jiles	
2021	The Tragedy of Macbeth	Joel Coen	play by William Shakespeare	
2022	All Quiet on the Western Front	Edward Berger, Lesley Paterson, and Ian Stokell	novel by Erich Maria Remarque	
2023	Poor Things	Tony McNamara	novel by Alasdair Gray	
2024	Sing Sing	Clint Bentley and Greg Kwedar	book by John H. Richardson	
2025	Train Dreams	Clint Bentley and Greg Kwedar	novella by Denis Johnson	

== Multiple winners ==
2 wins

- Clint Bentley (consecutive)
- Joel Coen
- Greg Kwedar (consecutive)
- Alexander Payne

== See also ==
- Academy Award for Best Adapted Screenplay
