= Gary Fisketjon =

American editor (1954–2026)

Gary Lynn Fisketjon (September 3, 1954 – November 7, 2026) was an American editor and vice-president of Knopf Publishing until his dismissal in May 2019. Fisketjon created the Vintage Contemporaries line of paperbacks at Random House. He was the editorial director for the Atlantic Monthly Press from 1986 to 1990. Fisketjon joined Alfred A. Knopf in 1990 as editor-at-large.

Authors that Fisketjon edited included Jay McInerney, Cormac McCarthy, Donna Tartt, Bret Easton Ellis, Tobias Wolff, Julian Barnes, Patricia Highsmith, Haruki Murakami, and Richard Ford.

== Biography ==
Fisketjon was born in Salem, Oregon, on September 3, 1954, and grew up working on his parents' mink ranch. He earned a degree in philosophy and history from Williams College in 1975. He took training at the Radcliffe Publishing Course in Boston, and worked at William Morrow for a year before he was hired at Random House in 1978 as an assistant to the editor in chief, Jason Epstein, becoming an editor in 1980. After four years at the Atlantic Monthly Press, he was hired by Knopf in 1990 as editor-at-large.

Fisketjon was fired by Knopf in 2019 for what they described at the time only as "a breach of company policy". It was reported several years later that in the precipitating incident, he returned from lunch drunk and put his hands on the shoulders of a young Knopf employee, who complained to her supervisor.

Fisketjon returned to Salem in 2020 and worked as a free-lance editor for several years. He then joined the magazine County Highway and its book imprint, Panamerica, as literary editor. The magazine's editor, David Samuels, said he had created Panamerica with an editor like Fisketjon in mind, and called him "the most important editor of American fiction in the last 50 years".

Fisketjon died at his home in Salem on November 7, 2026, at the age of 72.
