= Thumbsucker =

Thumbsucker or thumb sucking may refer to:

- Thumb sucking
- Thumbsucker (novel), a 1999 novel by Walter Kirn
- Thumbsucker (film), a 2005 film directed by Mike Mills based on the novel
- Thumbsucker (soundtrack), the soundtrack to the 2005 film
- (journalistic slang) a lengthy think piece or editorial on a complex topic
- A mode of data theft
