= Florida Film Critics Circle Awards 2009 =

Annual US film awards ceremony

14th FFCC Awards

December 21, 2009

Best Picture:
Up in the Air

The 14th Florida Film Critics Circle Awards were given on December 21, 2009.

== Winners ==
- Best Actor:
  - George Clooney - Up in the Air
- Best Actress:
  - Gabourey Sidibe - Precious
- Best Animated Film:
  - Up
- Best Cinematography:
  - Mauro Fiore - Avatar
- Best Director:
  - Jason Reitman - Up in the Air
- Best Documentary Film:
  - The Cove
- Best Film:
  - Up in the Air
- Best Foreign Language Film:
  - Sin Nombre • Spain
- Best Screenplay:
  - 500 Days of Summer - Scott Neustadter and Michael Weber
- Best Supporting Actor:
  - Christoph Waltz - Inglourious Basterds
- Best Supporting Actress:
  - Mo'Nique - Precious
- Pauline Kael Breakout Award:
  - Gabourey Sidibe - Precious
