= Donald Rosenfeld =

American film producer

Donald Rosenfeld is an American film producer who was the president of Merchant Ivory Productions from 1986 through 1998. Rosenfeld was the lead producer on the major Merchant Ivory films created in what is now considered their golden decade. Along with Ismail Merchant, James Ivory and Ruth Prawer Jhabvala, Rosenfeld worked on the creation of the well-received films Mr. and Mrs. Bridge, Howards End (8 Academy Award nominations), and The Remains of the Day (9 Academy Award nominations), among others. Rosenfeld was the youngest producer ever to become a member of the Academy of Motion Picture Arts and Sciences in 1992. He's now the publisher of County Highway, a magazine in the form of a 19th-century newspaper founded by David Samuels and Walter Kirn.

== Life and work ==
From 1986 to 1998, Rosenfeld ran Merchant Ivory Productions, working for films including Slaves of New York to Surviving Picasso.

Rosenfeld has continued to produce major motion pictures, following his Merchant Ivory years. Terrence Malick's The Tree of Life won the top prize at the 64th Cannes Film Festival. The films Color of a Brisk and Leaping Day and Forty Shades of Blue won the top prize at the Sundance Film Festival.

In partnership with Andreas Roald, Rosenfeld founded Sovereign Films in 2008. They produced Effie Gray, written by and starring two-time Oscar winner, Emma Thompson, as well as Cradle of Champions and Terrence Malick's Voyage of Time.

Rosenfeld resides in New York City. He is also a collector of contemporary art, primarily paintings and photography.

== Filmography ==
- Cradle of Champions (2018) by Battle Bull
- Voyage of Time (2016) by Terrence Malick
- Effie Gray (2014) by Richard Laxton
- Jodorowsky's Dune (2013) by Frank Pavich - Executive Producer
- The Tree of Life (2011) by Terrence Malick
- Anton Chekhov's The Duel (2010) by Dover Koshashvili
- Tonight at Noon (2009) by Michael Almereyda - Producer
- Eugene O'Neill: A Documentary Film (2006 TV documentary) by Ric Burns - Executive Producer
- William Eggleston in the Real World (2005 documentary) by Michael Almereyda - Executive Producer
- Forty Shades of Blue (2005) by Ira Sachs - Producer
- The American Experience (TV series documentary)
  - New York: Center of the World (2003) by Ira Sachs - Executive Producer
- Mountain Men and Holy Wars (2003 documentary) by Taran Davies - Executive Producer
- Acrobacias del corazón (2000) by María Teresa Constantini - Associate Producer
- New York: A Documentary Film (1999 TV mini-series documentary) by Ric Burns - Producer
- Rembrandt (1999) by Charles Matton - Associate Producer
- Catwalk (1996 documentary) by Robert Leacock - Executive Producer
- Color of a Brisk and Leaping Day (1996) by Chris Munch - Executive Producer
- The Proprietor (1996) by James Ivory - Producer
- Surviving Picasso (1996) by James Ivory - Executive Producer
- Jefferson in Paris (1995) by James Ivory - Executive Producer
- Feast of July (1995) by Christopher Meneul - Associate Producer
- The Remains of the Day (1993) by James Ivory - Associate Producer
- In Custody (1993) by Ismail Merchant - Executive Producer
- Howards End (1992) by James Ivory - Associate Producer
- The Ballad of the Sad Cafe (1991) by Simon Callow - Associate Producer
- Mr. & Mrs. Bridge (1990) by James Ivory
- Slaves of New York (1989) by James Ivory
- The Perfect Murder (1988) by Zafar Hai - Co-producer

=== Actor ===
- The Proprietor (1996) by Ismail Merchant - The Auction - Maître Ertaud
