= Lost in the Meritocracy =

2009 memoir by Walter Kirn

- Author: Walter Kirn
- Language: English
- Genre: Memoir
- Publisher: Doubleday
- Publication date: May 2009
- Publication place: United States
- Media type: Print (Hardback
- Pages: 224 pp (hardback edition)
- ISBN: 0-385-52128-6 (hardback edition)

Lost in the Meritocracy: The Undereducation of an Overachiever is a 2009 memoir by Walter Kirn. It describes his own trip through the American education system from rural Minnesota to Princeton University.

The author also wrote an earlier essay under the same title for The Atlantic.

The book was reviewed twice in The New York Times. The Times also listed it as a "notable book of 2009".

Other reviews appeared in The Washington Post and Commentary Magazine, and the book was recommended on Time Magazine's "Short List of Things to Do".
