= Vancouver Film Critics Circle Award for Best Director =

Canadian film award

The Vancouver Film Critics Circle Award for Best Director is an annual award given by the Vancouver Film Critics Circle.

== Winners ==
=== 2000s ===
Year	Winner	Film	Ref
2000	Steven Soderbergh	Traffic	
2000	Darren Aronofsky	Requiem for a Dream	
2000	Ang Lee	Crouching Tiger, Hidden Dragon	
2001	Baz Luhrmann	Moulin Rouge!	
2001	Robert Altman	Gosford Park	
2001	Wes Anderson	The Royal Tenenbaums	
2001	David Lynch	Mulholland Drive	
2001	Peter Jackson	The Lord of the Rings: The Fellowship of the Ring	
2002	Stephen Daldry	The Hours	
2002	Roman Polanski	The Pianist	
2002	Martin Scorsese	Gangs of New York	
2003	Peter Jackson	The Lord of the Rings: The Return of the King	
2003	Sofia Coppola	Lost in Translation	
2003	Clint Eastwood	Mystic River	
2004	Clint Eastwood	Million Dollar Baby	
2004	Alexander Payne	Sideways	
2004	Martin Scorsese	The Aviator	
2005	Ang Lee	Brokeback Mountain	
2005	George Clooney	Good Night, and Good Luck.	
2005	David Cronenberg	A History of Violence	
2006	Alfonso Cuarón	Children of Men	
2006	Clint Eastwood	Letters from Iwo Jima	
2006	Martin Scorsese	The Departed	
2007	Joel Coen and Ethan Coen	No Country for Old Men	
2007	Paul Thomas Anderson	There Will Be Blood	
2007	Jason Reitman	Juno	
2008	David Fincher	The Curious Case of Benjamin Button	
2008	Danny Boyle	Slumdog Millionaire	
2008	Gus Van Sant	Milk	
2009	Kathryn Bigelow	The Hurt Locker	
2009	Jason Reitman	Up in the Air	
2009	Quentin Tarantino	Inglourious Basterds	

=== 2010s ===
Year	Winner	Film	Ref
2010	David Fincher	The Social Network	
2010	Darren Aronofsky	Black Swan	
2010	Joel Coen and Ethan Coen	True Grit	
2011	Terrence Malick	The Tree of Life	
2011	Michel Hazanavicius	The Artist	
2011	Martin Scorsese	Hugo	
2012	Kathryn Bigelow	Zero Dark Thirty	
2012	Ang Lee	Life of Pi	
2012	Steven Spielberg	Lincoln	
2013	Alfonso Cuaron	Gravity	
2013	Joel Coen and Ethan Coen	Inside Llewyn Davis	
2013	Steve McQueen	12 Years a Slave	
2014	Alejandro González Iñárritu	Birdman or (The Unexpected Virtue of Ignorance)	
2014	Richard Linklater	Boyhood	
2014	Wes Anderson	The Grand Budapest Hotel	
2015	George Miller	Mad Max: Fury Road	
2015	Todd Haynes	Carol	
2015	Alejandro González Iñárritu	The Revenant	
2016	Kenneth Lonergan	Manchester by the Sea	
2016	Damien Chazelle	La La Land	
2016	Denis Villeneuve	Arrival	
2017	Paul Thomas Anderson	Phantom Thread	
2017	Greta Gerwig	Lady Bird	
2017	Christopher Nolan	Dunkirk	
2018	Paul Schrader	First Reformed	
2018	Alfonso Cuarón	Roma	
2018	Yorgos Lanthimos	The Favourite	
2019	Bong Joon-ho	Parasite	
2019	Sam Mendes	1917	
2019	Martin Scorsese	The Irishman	

=== 2020s ===
Year	Winner	Film	Ref
2020	Chloé Zhao	Nomadland	
2020	David Fincher	Mank	
2020	Thomas Vinterberg	Another Round	
2021	Denis Villeneuve	Dune	
2021	Kenneth Branagh	Belfast	
2021	Jane Campion	The Power of the Dog	
2022	Daniel Kwan and Daniel Sceinert	Everything Everywhere All at Once	
2022	Todd Field	Tár	
2022	Martin McDonagh	The Banshees of Inisherin	
2023	Christopher Nolan	Oppenheimer	
2023	Jonathan Glazer	The Zone of Interest	
2023	Martin Scorsese	Killers of the Flower Moon	
2024	Denis Villeneuve	Dune: Part Two	
2024	Sean Baker	Anora	
2024	RaMell Ross	Nickel Boys	
2025	Ryan Coogler	Sinners	
2025	Paul Thomas Anderson	One Battle After Another	
2025	Chloé Zhao	Hamnet	
