= Up in the Air (novel) =

2001 novel by American author Walter Kirn

- First edition cover
- Author: Walter Kirn
- Language: English
- Publisher: Doubleday
- Publication date: 2001
- Publication place: United States
- Media type: Print (hardback & paperback)
- Pages: 303
- ISBN: 978-0-385-49710-7
- OCLC: 46472260
- Dewey Decimal: 813/.54 21
- LC Class: PS3561.I746 U6 2001
- Preceded by: Thumbsucker (1999)
- Followed by: Mission to America (2005)

Up in the Air is a 2001 novel by American author Walter Kirn. It was adapted into the 2009 feature film of the same name starring George Clooney.

== Plot summary ==
Ryan Bingham is a 35-year-old career transition counselor for a Denver-based management consulting company, Integrated Strategic Management (ISM). He is divorced and his disturbed younger sister is about to embark on yet another disastrous relationship. He flies around the country firing and then counseling recently laid-off people for reentering the job market.

Bingham inhabits a world of Palm Pilots, rental cars, salted almonds, Kevlar luggage and nameless suite hotels where e-mail and voicemail are the communication norm. He takes a lot of pills and spends time among women in Las Vegas.

Bingham is trying to get to a million frequent flyer miles, a number only reached by nine other people in the same mileage club (from the fictional airline Great West). Before his boss returns from vacation, Bingham files his letter of resignation and cancels his company credit card. Bingham is positioning himself to be hired by MythTech, a shadowy company based in Omaha, Nebraska.

Bingham fears that someone may be furtively cashing in his precious miles, which would be tantamount to stealing his soul.

== Writing ==
Kirn wrote the book in rural Montana during a snowbound winter on a ranch while thinking about airports, airplanes and about a particular conversation he had with another passenger in a first-class cabin. That passenger stated that he used to have an apartment in Atlanta but never used it. He got a storage locker instead, since he stayed in hotels and was on the road 300 days a year. He considered the flight crew to be like family, and indicated that he knew the flight attendant by name and knew her kids' names.

== Film adaptation ==
Jason Reitman and Sheldon Turner adapted this novel into a 2009 award-winning feature film starring George Clooney. The film was critically acclaimed and was nominated for six Academy Awards, including Best Picture.

== Sales ==
The book received some good reviews and initially sold well until September 11, 2001 when sales slowed to a near halt. The cover's cartoon of flying businesspeople, one of them on fire and hurtling earthward in a similar manner to The Falling Man, also hurt sales. Sales of the book were revived following Jason Reitman's film adaptation.
