= Christian Gerhartsreiter =

German criminal (born 1961)

- Born: Christian Karl Gerhartsreiter; 21 February 1961 (age 65); Siegsdorf, Bavaria, West Germany
- Other names: Clark Rockefeller; Christopher C. Crowe; Christopher Mountbatten; Charles "Chip" Smith; Christopher Kenneth Gerhart; Christopher Chichester
- Spouses: Amy Jersild Duhnke (m. 1981; div. 1992) Sandra Boss (m. 1995; div. 2007)
- Children: 1
- Convictions: Custodial kidnapping; Assault and battery with a dangerous weapon; First-degree murder
- Penalty: 27 years to life (first-degree murder); 4 to 5 years (kidnapping); 2 to 3 years (assault and battery with dangerous weapon)

Details
- Victims: Daughter (custodial kidnapping); Jonathan Sohus (first-degree murder)
- Date: 27 July 2008; February 1985 (first-degree murder)
- Country: United States
- States: Massachusetts, California
- Locations: Boston, Massachusetts (kidnapping and assault); San Marino, California (first-degree murder)
- Killed: 1
- Date apprehended: 2 August 2008
- Imprisoned at: San Quentin State Prison

Christian Karl Gerhartsreiter (born 21 February 1961) is a German convicted murderer and impostor. Born in West Germany, he is currently serving a prison sentence in the U.S. state of California. After moving to the United States in his late teens, Gerhartsreiter lived under a succession of aliases while variously claiming to be an actor, a director, an art collector, a physicist, a ship's captain, a negotiator of international debt agreements and an English aristocrat.

In 1995, while assuming the identity of Clark Rockefeller, claiming to be a member of the noted Rockefeller family, Gerhartsreiter married a successful businesswoman named Sandra Boss; they had a daughter together. Gerhartsreiter lived well solely on his wife's income. However, she became dissatisfied with his secretive, controlling behavior and sought a divorce. Inquiries on her behalf revealed that Gerhartsreiter had fabricated his name and family background. The couple divorced and Gerhartsreiter agreed to accept limited access to his daughter on supervised visits. Gerhartsreiter was arrested on 2 August 2008, six days after he abducted his daughter while she was on a visit. He was subsequently convicted of the custodial kidnapping of his daughter.

In addition to Clark Rockefeller, Gerhartsreiter's aliases include Christopher Kenneth Gerhart, Christopher Chichester, Christopher C. Crowe, Christopher Mountbatten and Charles "Chip" Smith. Gerhartsreiter's true identity was revealed after author Edward Savio—with whom Gerhartsreiter briefly lived upon arriving in the U.S.—contacted the FBI during the manhunt after seeing a photo of "Clark Rockefeller" on the news. Police had been seeking Gerhartsreiter as a suspect in the 1985 disappearance of a married couple, Jonathan and Linda Sohus, in California. He was convicted in 2013 of Jonathan Sohus's murder and is serving 27 years to life in a California prison.

== Early life ==
Christian Gerhartsreiter was born to Simon and Irmgard Gerhartsreiter in Siegsdorf, Bavaria, West Germany. His parents gave his birthdate as 21 February 1961 while Gerhartsreiter himself claimed to have been born on 29 February 1960. He has a brother, Alexander Gerhartsreiter. After being arrested by Boston police in 2007, Gerhartsreiter claimed that his mother was Ann Carter, an American child actress of the 1940s, and claimed that she had died. Carter was in fact still alive at the time and denied this claim in August 2007.

== Arrival in the U.S. ==
In 1978, Gerhartsreiter met an American couple, Elmer and Jean Kelln, who were traveling in West Germany. He later used their names to obtain permission to enter the United States, falsely declaring that the Kellns had invited him to stay with them in California. After entering the country in New York City, Gerhartsreiter went to Berlin, Connecticut, where he found the family of author Edward Savio, telling them that he was from a wealthy family in West Germany. The family allowed Gerhartsreiter to live with them, and in 1979 he was accepted as a foreign exchange student at Berlin High School. Eventually he wore out his welcome with the Savios and was told to leave.

Gerhartsreiter decided to move to California to pursue a career in acting. By the time he reached Milwaukee, he had started calling himself "Christopher Kenneth Gerhart." While there, he enrolled in a class at the University of Wisconsin–Milwaukee. Deciding that he wanted to become a U.S. citizen, he married 22-year-old Amy Jersild Duhnke in 1981 in Madison, Wisconsin, in order to obtain a green card. To persuade Duhnke to marry him, Gerhartsreiter falsely claimed that if he had gone back to West Germany, he would have to go into the military and be sent to fight in the Cold War on the Russian front line. The day after the wedding, Gerhartsreiter left his wife and headed for California. Duhnke filed for divorce in 1992.

== Gerhartsreiter's identities ==
=== Christopher Chichester ===
Using the alias "Christopher Chichester," Gerhartsreiter lived in the guesthouse of Ruth "Didi" Sohus (1917–1988) in the upscale community of San Marino, California. Chichester was the last name of a teacher Gerhartsreiter was infatuated with while attending Berlin High School, according to Savio.

Initially identified as a person of interest by police in the 1985 disappearance and death of Didi's son and daughter-in-law, Jonathan and Linda Sohus, Gerhartsreiter reportedly told people that the couple had traveled to Europe. Their family received a postcard purportedly sent from France, though its authenticity has been questioned. In late 1988, Gerhartsreiter was pulled over in Greenwich, Connecticut, while driving a pickup truck that had belonged to Jonathan Sohus, but he left the area before police could interview him. At that point, police had no proof that Jonathan and Linda Sohus were dead, nor that they had left California, voluntarily or otherwise.

In May 1994, bones believed to belong to Jonathan Sohus were found buried in the backyard of the couple's former property. Sohus' family members said the bones matched his general description. Since Sohus had been adopted, there was no way to compare his DNA against that of biological family members and arrive at a conclusive identity. Forensic evidence showed that the victim had been struck in the head two times with a rounded, blunt object and then stabbed six times; his body had been cut into three parts. The bones were not conclusively determined to belong to Sohus until 2010.

=== Christopher Crowe ===
After settling in Greenwich, Connecticut, Gerhartsreiter assumed the identity of "Christopher C. Crowe" and claimed to be a television producer from Los Angeles who worked on the 1980s revival of Alfred Hitchcock Presents. His alias matched the name of one of the producers for the series.

Gerhartsreiter was hired by the brokerage firm S.N. Phelps and Company to work with the firm's computers but was fired when it was discovered that the social security number he had given them belonged to serial killer David Berkowitz. He was fired from his employment by Nikko Securities Ltd. as a sales manager of corporate bonds. Gerhartsreiter briefly worked for Kidder, Peabody & Co., but quit his job and abandoned the Christopher Crowe persona when he discovered that police were looking for him in connection with the Sohus disappearances.

=== Clark Rockefeller ===
In 1995, using the name "James Frederick Mills Clark Rockefeller," Gerhartsreiter married Sandra Boss, a high-earning McKinsey senior executive. They were married in a Quaker ceremony that had limited legal status. Boss later testified that Gerhartsreiter was charming and that she believed the stories he told her at the beginning of their relationship. Later, however, he became emotionally abusive. Although Boss earned all of the household income, she testified that Gerhartsreiter held complete control of the family's finances and other aspects of her day-to-day life. The couple had a daughter, born in 2001.

Gerhartsreiter went to great lengths to conceal his true identity from his wife. He repeatedly told Boss to file her tax return as a single person. Later in their marriage, when McKinsey required that a certified public accountant do her taxes, Gerhartsreiter found an accountant for her. After their divorce, Boss learned that he had told their accountant he was her brother so that the accountant would continue filing single tax returns for her.

Gerhartsreiter lived with his wife and daughter in Cornish, New Hampshire, where he used his supposed familial ties to the Rockefeller family to bolster his reputation, telling friends and neighbors that he was a wealthy Yale graduate who owned a business in Canada. Using the Clark Rockefeller persona, he had gained membership to Boston's Algonquin Club, where he spent a great deal of time. He resigned as one of the club's directors in April 2008.

In 2006, Boss hired a private investigator and discovered that Gerhartsreiter was not who he claimed to be, though she did not learn his real name at that time. After divorcing him, Boss legally changed the name of their daughter and accused him of lying about his relation to the Rockefeller family; members of the family came forward to deny any relation to Gerhartsreiter.

Boss would later testify at Gerhartsreiter's trial that he had agreed to give her custody of their daughter following the divorce and to supervised visits three times a year in return for an $800,000 settlement, two cars, her engagement ring, and a dress that he had given her. Boss moved with their child to London following the divorce.

== Arrest and prosecutions ==
=== Custodial kidnapping and capture ===
During a 27 July 2008, supervised visitation, Gerhartsreiter, his daughter, and a social worker were in Boston's Back Bay neighborhood on a walk to the Boston Common. Approached by a sport utility vehicle, Gerhartsreiter pushed aside the social worker, grabbed his daughter, jumped into the vehicle, and sped away. The social worker held onto the vehicle and was dragged a short distance before falling free. A warrant was issued later that night charging Gerhartsreiter with custodial kidnapping, assault and battery, and assault with a deadly weapon – namely the sport utility vehicle.

On 2 August 2008, after a week-long search, Gerhartsreiter was found in Baltimore, Maryland, where he had recently purchased an apartment for about $450,000 under the name Charles "Chip" Smith. With the help of the owner of a local marina, where Gerhartsreiter had apparently kept a catamaran, FBI agents were able to lure him out of the apartment with a telephone call telling him the boat was taking on water. He was arrested as he left the apartment on the kidnapping and assault charges. The child was found unharmed inside the apartment.

=== Identification ===
On 15 August 2008, the FBI, the Massachusetts State Police, the Boston Police Department, and the Suffolk County District Attorney announced that Clark Rockefeller had been positively identified as Christian Karl Gerhartsreiter. He was conclusively identified by means of forensic examinations conducted by the FBI Laboratory in Quantico, Virginia. When Gerhartsreiter was arrested, his fingerprint impressions were taken by FBI agents in Baltimore and by Boston Police when he was returned to Massachusetts. Those fingerprints were compared to latent fingerprints lifted from a variety of sources. They matched a latent print lifted from a wine glass in Boston collected at the time of the search for Gerhartsreiter and his daughter earlier in the month. Those fingerprints also matched a latent print developed from a document in Gerhartsreiter's immigration file from the early 1980s. Although there were no fingerprint cards or inked impressions in the immigration file, the FBI Laboratory was able to develop latent print impressions from a document in that file, which had been provided by ICE. Through fingerprint analysis, the FBI confirmed Gerhartsreiter's identity.

=== Prosecution ===
On 3 September 2008, Gerhartsreiter was charged with furnishing a false name to a law enforcement officer following an arrest. His lawyers later argued that he did not do this for dishonest purposes. On 2 October, at a hearing requested by defense attorney Stephen Hrones, bail was revoked. Hrones had requested the hearing in order to seek a reduction from the $50 million cash bail under which the defendant had previously been held. Instead, the judge ordered the defendant to be held without bail. On 13 February 2009, Gerhartsreiter's attorneys filed notice that they intended to deploy an insanity defense.

During the trial, conducted in Boston in mid-2009, Gerhartsreiter's defense team told jurors that he believed his daughter had communicated with him telepathically from London, where she and her mother moved after the divorce, begging him to rescue her. Two expert witnesses for the defense testified that they have diagnosed Gerhartsreiter with delusional disorder, grandiose type, and narcissistic personality disorder. One of the defense experts, Dr. Keith Ablow, testified that Gerhartsreiter told him that his father had been emotionally abusive during his childhood. Dr. James Chu, a psychiatrist for the prosecution, testified that he had diagnosed Gerhartsreiter with a "'mixed personality disorder,' with narcissistic and anti-social traits" but felt that Gerhartsreiter had exaggerated his symptoms of mental illness and was capable of knowing right from wrong. He noted the defendant had allegedly meticulously planned the details of the abduction well in advance. Gerhartsreiter himself did not take the witness stand.

Closing arguments concluded on 8 June 2009. On 12 June, the jury convicted Gerhartsreiter of the kidnapping of his daughter as well as one count of assault and battery with a dangerous weapon, for ordering his getaway driver to pull away even while his daughter's social worker was hanging onto the vehicle. He was acquitted of a second assault charge as well as for giving a false name to police. The judge sentenced him to four to five years in state prison on the kidnapping count and a concurrent two to three years on the assault charge.

=== Conviction for the murder of Jonathan Sohus ===
News reports indicated that a grand jury was to be convened in the spring of 2009 to examine the evidence in the Sohus case. Judge Frank Gaziano, who presided over Gerhartsreiter's parental kidnapping trial, had barred prosecutors from presenting evidence about the Sohus case to avoid prejudicing jurors against the defendant.

On 15 March 2011, Los Angeles County prosecutors charged Gerhartsreiter with the murder of Jonathan Sohus. The murder trial was held in March and April 2013, and ended with Gerhartsreiter being convicted of first-degree murder on 10 April 2013. The verdict included an enhancement for use of a deadly weapon to bludgeon Sohus to death. Evidence in the case was largely circumstantial, but jurors were most swayed by two plastic book bags found buried with Sohus's remains: one from the University of Wisconsin-Milwaukee, where Gerhartsreiter attended classes between 1979 and 1982, and one from the University of Southern California, where Gerhartsreiter audited film classes. Jurors also heard evidence that Gerhartsreiter was in possession of Sohus's pickup truck following the murder.

On 15 August 2013, Gerhartsreiter was given the maximum sentence of 27 years to life with credit for one year served after finishing his sentence in Massachusetts. After he was convicted, Gerhartsreiter fired his lawyers and represented himself during the sentencing phase. He maintained his innocence during the sentencing hearing and said, "I want to assert my innocence and that I firmly believe that the victim's wife killed the victim, but be that as it may, once again, I did not commit the crime of which I stand accused." His sentence was reduced on appeal in 2015, to 26 years to life. With good time credits, he will be eligible for parole in December 2029, when he will be 68 years old; a parole hearing is currently scheduled for November 2028.

Gerhartsreiter was initially transferred to North Kern State Prison in September 2013 before being transferred to Ironwood State Prison in March 2014. His appeal was denied on 23 October 2015, and again on 20 January 2016, thus exhausting state appeals. In December 2016, he was transferred to San Quentin State Prison.

== In popular culture ==
The case of Christian Gerhartsreiter has been covered extensively in various media since his arrest and exposure.

Title	Author	Medium/genre	Release date
Unsolved Mysteries, Season 7, Episode 11	NBC (network)	Television Show	1995
Who Is Clark Rockefeller?	Lifetime (network)	Film	2010
The Man in the Rockefeller Suit	Mark Seal	Non-fiction book	2011
Schroder: A Novel	Amity Gaige	Fiction novel	2013
Name Dropper	Frank Girardot	Non-fiction book	2014
Blood Will Out (memoir)	Walter Kirn	Memoir	2014
The Six Million Dollar Conman	Channel 4	Television documentary	2012
My Friend Rockefeller	LOOKSfilm	Television documentary	2015
Episode 30	Georgia Hardstark, Karen Kilgariff (My Favorite Murder podcast)	Podcast episode	2016
A Rockefeller By Any Other Name	Liar City	Podcast episode	2016
Episode 24	Judge and Jeremy	Podcast episode	2017
Episode 14: Christian Gerhartsreiter	Con Artists	Podcast episode	2019
Episode 55: The Power of Suggestion & Con Man Clark Rockefeller	Let's Go To Court!	Podcast episode	2019
Episode 79: The Rockefeller	Swindled	Podcast episode	2022
Blood & Money, Season 1, Episode 8: "Inventing a Rockefeller"'	CNBC	Television Show	2023
Three Weddings and a Funeral	Scamfluencers	Podcast episode	2023
Who is Clark Rockefeller?	Avery After Dark	Podcast episode	2023
Becoming Clark Rockefeller: Murder, Love, Deception, and the Con Man Behind It All	Frank Girardot	Non-fiction book	2023
Man Installs Pool, Accidentally Solves 10-Year FBI Cold Case	Brew	YouTube video	2025
