= County Highway (magazine) =

American magazine

County Highway is an American magazine in the form of a 19th-century American broadsheet, founded in 2023 by writer-editors David Samuels and Walter Kirn. It is published by film producer Donald Rosenfeld. Six issues are published per year, with each issue being about 20 pages long, including one page of classified ads. The magazine is published in print with a digital microfilm archive of past issues available to subscribers.

== Overview ==
The masthead was designed by Lisa Orth, the first art director of Sub Pop Records, who designed Nirvana's logo and the cover of the band's first album, Bleach. According to Airmail, the magazine is a defense of "the American voice", described by Samuels as "a posture of amazement and receptivity to lunacy, and also a focus on hard facts".

=== Approach ===
In an interview with Fox News, Walter Kirn said that County Highway "aims to reverse the focus of mainstream journalism from big cities to small towns." On a similar note, Kirn told the Montana Free Press that the magazine "treats everything the way small town or small city newspapers treat their places: without special status or metropolitan privilege." In an article titled “J.Crew-Anon&the Mainstreaming of Dissent,” Cooper Davis called the paper “the flagship chronicle of this cultural shift,” in which radicalized normies are turning away from institutions and adopting a sensibility that is “credible-but-not-credulous.”

In addition to cultural essays, investigations, and reported features County Highway also has a music section, as their editor's letter describes Americans as "a musical people". According to its publisher Donald Rosenfeld, County Highway will be the periodical representation of Pan American Books. which "will focus on books that the conglomerates tend to ignore".

=== Distribution ===
County Highway is available in print by mail subscription. Individual issues are available for sale at about 400 book stores, record stores, general stores and other small business located in all 50 US states, as well as outlets in London and Paris. The paper can also be found in cafes, restaurants, feed stores, bakeries and breweries.
