= Blood Will Out (memoir) =

2014 book by Walter Kir

Blood Will Out: The True Story of a Murder, a Mystery, and a Masquerade
- Author: Walter Kirn
- Language: English
- Genre: Memoir
- Publisher: Liveright
- Publication date: March 2014
- Publication place: United States
- Media type: Print (Hardback
- Pages: 272 pp (hardback edition)
- ISBN: 978-0871404510 (hardback edition)

Blood Will Out: The True Story of a Murder, a Mystery, and a Masquerade is a 2014 memoir by Walter Kirn. It describes his experiences being a close friend to a man he knew as Clark Rockefeller, who claimed to be the scion of the notable Rockefeller family in the US. In reality, Clark Rockefeller was an alias, and he was really Christian Gerhartsreiter, a German immigrant to the United States who had been working as a con man for over 20 years, and who was soon to be convicted of murder.
