= Mission to America =

2005 novel by Walter Kirn

- First edition
- Author: Walter Kirn
- Language: English
- Genre: Satirical novel
- Publisher: Doubleday
- Publication date: 11 October 2005
- Publication place: United States
- Media type: Print (hardback & paperback)
- Pages: 271 pp (first edition, hardback)
- ISBN: 0-385-50764-X (first edition, hardback)
- OCLC: 58919935
- Dewey Decimal: 813/.54 22
- LC Class: PS3561.I746 M57 2005

Mission to America is a novel by American novelist Walter Kirn.

The novel is narrated by Mason LaVerle, a member of a tiny religious sect in rural Bluff, Montana, called the Aboriginal Fulfilled Apostles, whose complicated views involve a kind of highly incorporative theology and a strict dietary regimen that facilitates healthy gastrointestinal activity. Concerned about the AFAs' dwindling numbers and attempting to capitalize on a recent spate of unexpected national attention, LaVerle and a partner, Elder Stark, set out on a mission to bring converts to the faith. Neither has been outside of Bluff before, and the pair quickly find themselves fending off the onslaught of corrupting influences they encounter in modern America, most prominently junk food and sex. After a series of misadventures, the duo ends up in Snowshoe, Colorado, a ski resort populated by a horrifying cast of the decadent rich and their hangers-on, where LaVerle finds romance with a former internet nude model and Stark becomes a toadying guru for an eccentric billionaire. As Stark gets sucked into the orbit of this bizarre community, LaVerle fights to save him and his dying faith, while battling his own temptations.
