= Thumbsucker (novel) =

1999 novel by Walter Kirn

- First edition cover
- Author: Walter Kirn
- Language: English
- Publisher: Anchor Books
- Publication date: November 1999
- Publication place: United States
- Media type: Print (hardback & paperback)
- Pages: 300 pp (hardback edition)
- ISBN: 0-385-49709-1 (hardback edition)
- OCLC: 40776731
- Dewey Decimal: 813/.54 21
- LC Class: PS3561.I746 T48 1999
- Followed by: Up in the Air (2001)

Thumbsucker is a 1999 novel by Walter Kirn. It was adapted into a film of the same name by Mike Mills in 2005.

== Plot introduction ==
Kirn's novel tells the story of Justin Cobb, a Minnesota teenager whose family experiences a broad spectrum of dysfunction. Father Mike is a washed-up college football star with a militaristic and unemotional attitude inspired by his former coach. Mother Audrey, a nurse, is struggling to accept how her life has wound down. Younger brother Joel simply does everything he can to fit in and seem normal.

Amidst pressures to stop sucking his thumb, 14-year-old Justin turns to unorthodox dentist Perry Lyman who attempts to use hypnosis to remedy the problem with limited success: the thumb sucking disappears, but other problem habits arise to take its place. Justin starts behaving oddly, and his condition is 'identified' as attention deficit disorder by his school and he is consequently prescribed Ritalin. The drug appears to help the problem for a time, but this is merely a stop-gap whilst Justin's (and indeed his family's) real problems remain at large. When Justin gives up Ritalin he turns to drugs, sex, and religion to combat his problems. Eventually deciding that he's had enough of this life, Justin returns to Perry Lyman who reminds him that we all have flaws, the goal is not to fix them, but to live with them. With this message in mind, Justin is sent off to be a Mormon missionary in New York, and winds up sucking his thumb again, at the expense of drugs and sex.
