= Jason Reitman =

Canadian and American filmmaker (born 1977)

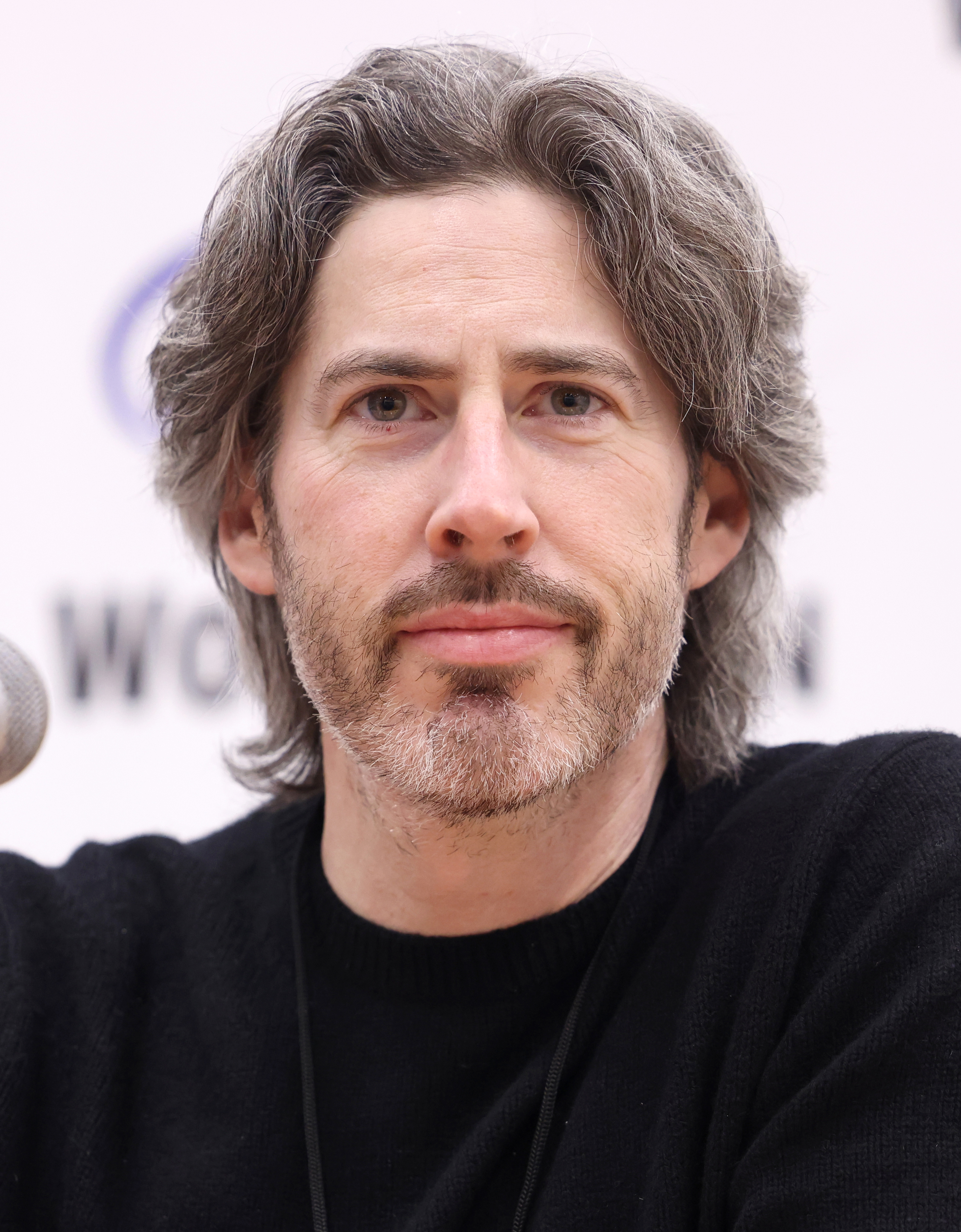
- Reitman in 2025
- Born: October 19, 1977 (age 49); Montreal, Quebec, Canada
- Citizenship: Canada; United States
- Education: Skidmore College; University of Southern California (BA)
- Occupations: Film director; producer; screenwriter; actor
- Years active: 1988–present
- Spouse: Michele Lee (m. 2004; div. 2014)
- Children: 1
- Father: Ivan Reitman
- Relatives: Catherine Reitman (sister) Caroline Reitman (sister)

Jason R. Reitman ( /ˈraɪtmən/; born October 19, 1977) is a Canadian and American filmmaker. He is best known for directing the films Thank You for Smoking (2005), Juno (2007), Up in the Air (2009), Young Adult (2011), Ghostbusters: Afterlife (2021), and Saturday Night (2024). He has received a Grammy Award, a Golden Globe, and four Academy Award nominations, two for Best Director. He is the son of director Ivan Reitman and is known for frequently collaborating with screenwriter Diablo Cody and director Gil Kenan.

== Early life ==
Reitman was born in Montreal, Quebec, the son of Geneviève Robert, an actress sometimes billed as Geneviève Deloir, and film director Ivan Reitman (1946–2022). He has two younger sisters: Catherine Reitman, an actress, producer and writer, who is four years younger, and Caroline Reitman, a nurse, who is 11 years younger.

Jason Reitman's father was born in Czechoslovakia, to Jewish parents who were Holocaust survivors. His paternal grandfather ran a dry cleaner and then a car wash. His mother is of French-Canadian descent and grew up a Christian; she converted to Judaism. When he was still a child, his family moved to Los Angeles. His father, Ivan, directed the films Ghostbusters, Ghostbusters II, Stripes, and Kindergarten Cop.

Jason Reitman grew up on sets and has photos of himself as a baby on the set of Animal House in 1978; Bill Murray said that Reitman was "a pain in the ass" while filming Ghostbusters, with Dan Aykroyd joking that "he was directing back then". Such experiences showed him that making movies is "a job that people do, that it's not just this piece of magic that happens". Reitman made a cameos in a few of his father's films, notably in Kindergarten Cop in which he played a student at the school who is caught making out with a girl by John Kimble, who is played by Arnold Schwarzenegger.

Reitman feels he was "a loser... a movie geek...[and] shy" as a child. In the late 1980s, he began appearing in small acting parts and serving as a production assistant on his father's films. He learned how to edit film in the editing rooms of his father's movies. Reitman graduated from Harvard-Westlake School in Studio City, Los Angeles in 1995. He was a high jumper in high school, coached by Occidental College Hall-of-Famer Phil Sweeney.

Reitman attended Skidmore College in Saratoga Springs, New York and was to major in pre-med studies before transferring to the University of Southern California (USC) in Los Angeles to major in English and creative writing. At USC, he performed with improv group Commedus Interruptus.

== Film career ==
Reitman began making short films while at USC. Throughout his 20s, instead of accepting offers to make commercial feature films, he made his own short films and directing commercials. Although he was offered the opportunity to direct Dude, Where's My Car? on two occasions, he declined.

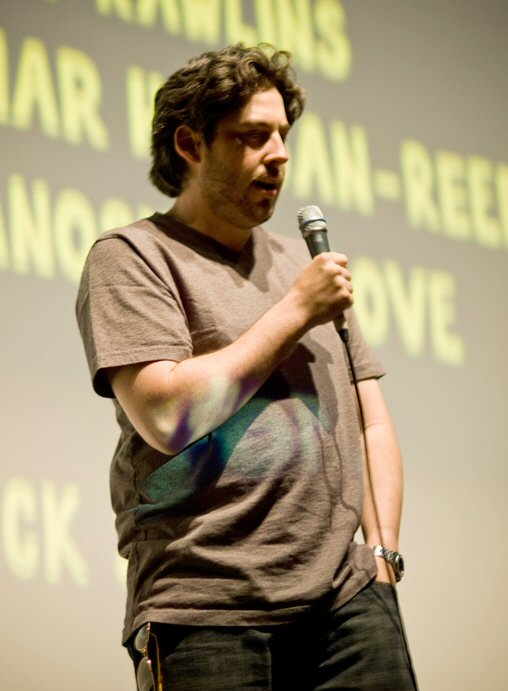
Reitman in 2007

Reitman's first feature film, Thank You for Smoking, opened in 2005. Reitman developed the Christopher Buckley novel into a screenplay and, eventually, a film. The film was a commercial and critical success. It grossed over $39 million worldwide by the end of its run, and was nominated for two Golden Globes. After the success of Thank You for Smoking, Reitman mentioned in an interview that his next film would be adapting another book (a "white collar satire") into a film. He also mentioned that he had plans to work with Buckley again on an original project. Although the first of the projects eventually became Up in the Air, the second project has not come to fruition.

His second film, Juno, generated great buzz after it premiered at the 2007 Toronto International Film Festival and was released in December 2007. It was Roger Ebert's favorite film of 2007 and received Oscar nominations for Best Picture, Elliot Page's performance as the title character, Diablo Cody's original screenplay, and Reitman himself for Best Director. Reitman did win other awards for his work on Juno, including Best Director at the 2008 Canadian Comedy Awards. The film grossed over $140 million at the U.S. box office, making it the largest success of Reitman's career and more successful than any of his father's films since Kindergarten Cop. Brad Silberling was originally attached to direct the film, but he dropped out over casting differences. Reitman was in the middle of writing a screenplay when he came on board to direct Juno and, at one point, he expressed intent to finish writing and to direct this screenplay.

In March 2006, Reitman formed the production company "Hard C Productions" with producing partner Daniel Dubiecki. The company had an overall deal with Fox Searchlight Pictures, the company that distributed Reitman's first two films. Reitman described his production company's goal as being to produce "small subversive comedy that is independent but accessible". Reitman states that he and Dubiecki "want to make unusual films, and anything that turns a genre on its ear". Through Hard C Productions, Reitman is set to produce and direct Banzai Shadowhands, a comedy about "a once-great ninja who is now living a life of mediocrity". Shadowhands will be written by The Office's Rainn Wilson. Reitman met Wilson on the set of his father's film My Super Ex-Girlfriend, in which Wilson had a supporting role. No start date for filming has been set, and it is unclear as to whether or not Wilson is finished with the script.

Hard C Productions produced films The Ornate Anatomy of Living Things and Jennifer's Body. Anatomy has been written by Matthew Spicer and Max Winkler, and will revolve around "a Gotham bookstore clerk who discovers a museum devoted to his life". Jennifer's Body is a horror comedy written by Diablo Cody and starring Megan Fox, about a cheerleader who is possessed by a demon and starts feeding off the boys in a Minnesota farming town. In 2009, Reitman left Hard C to form Right of Way Films.

In 2001, the year the novel Up in the Air was published, Sheldon Turner discovered the book and wrote a screenplay adaptation, which he sold to DreamWorks in 2003. Jason Reitman later came upon the novel (initially attracted by the Christopher Buckley blurb on the cover) while browsing in the Los Angeles bookstore Book Soup. Reitman persuaded his father Ivan Reitman to purchase the book's film rights, and the elder Reitman commissioned a screenplay from Ted and Nicholas Griffin, who used some elements from Turner's script in their own work. Jason Reitman then developed his own screenplay, incorporating some of the elements from the Griffins' script that had (unbeknownst to Reitman) originated with Turner. Some of Turner's inventions that were utilized in the final film include Ryan's boilerplate termination speech ("Anyone who ever built an empire or changed the world sat where you're sitting right now..."), a key plot point involving a suicide, and the character of Ryan's partner (written by Turner as male).

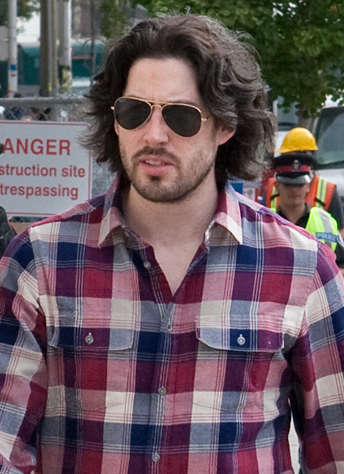
Reitman at the 2009 Toronto International Film Festival

Reitman initially attempted to claim sole credit for writing the film, and later admitted to being confused when the Writers Guild of America ruled that he should share credit with Turner. He and Turner later appeared at a WGA event where both said they were happy to share credit now that the course of events, and Turner's contribution to the final product, had been made clear.

In the spring of 2009, Reitman directed Up in the Air starring George Clooney. Up in the Air is based on a novel written by Walter Kirn about a corporate downsizer who travels from city to city and is fanatical about collecting his ten millionth frequent flier mile. The film features real-world characters cast from the ranks of the recently downsized. "Hidden within a film that seems to be about corporate termination and the economy is a movie about the decision whether to be alone or not," noted Reitman," in an interview conducted just prior to the film's nationwide release. Sheldon Turner and Reitman's Up in the Air screenplay won the Golden Globe Award for best screenplay in 2010.

Reitman was also an executive producer of the erotic thriller Chloe, theatrically released by Sony Pictures Classics on March 26, 2010. Reitman helped persuade Amanda Seyfried to star in the film. The film enjoyed commercial success and became director Atom Egoyan's biggest moneymaker ever. On January 15, 2019, Reitman announced he would be working on Ghostbusters: Afterlife, a continuation of the original Ghostbusters films directed by his father. Originally set for a June 2021, release, due to the COVID-19 pandemic the release date was pushed back to November 11, 2021. After the success of the film, both Reitman and his Ghostbusters: Afterlife co-writer and collaborator Gil Kenan formed their own production company Reitman/Kenan Productions and had signed an overall deal with Sony Pictures Entertainment to develop more projects. Reitman was set to return to direct the sequel to Ghostbusters: Afterlife entitled Frozen Empire, but later was replaced by Kenan, who remains as a producer and co-writer in the film, was released in 2024.

On October 11, 2024, Reitman directed and co-wrote alongside Kenan Saturday Night, a comedy biopic about the events directly preceding the live broadcast of Saturday Night Live's first episode on October 11, 1975. Canadian comedian Dan Aykroyd was a member of that SNL cast and describes the film as a "stand alone masterpiece."

=== Other work ===
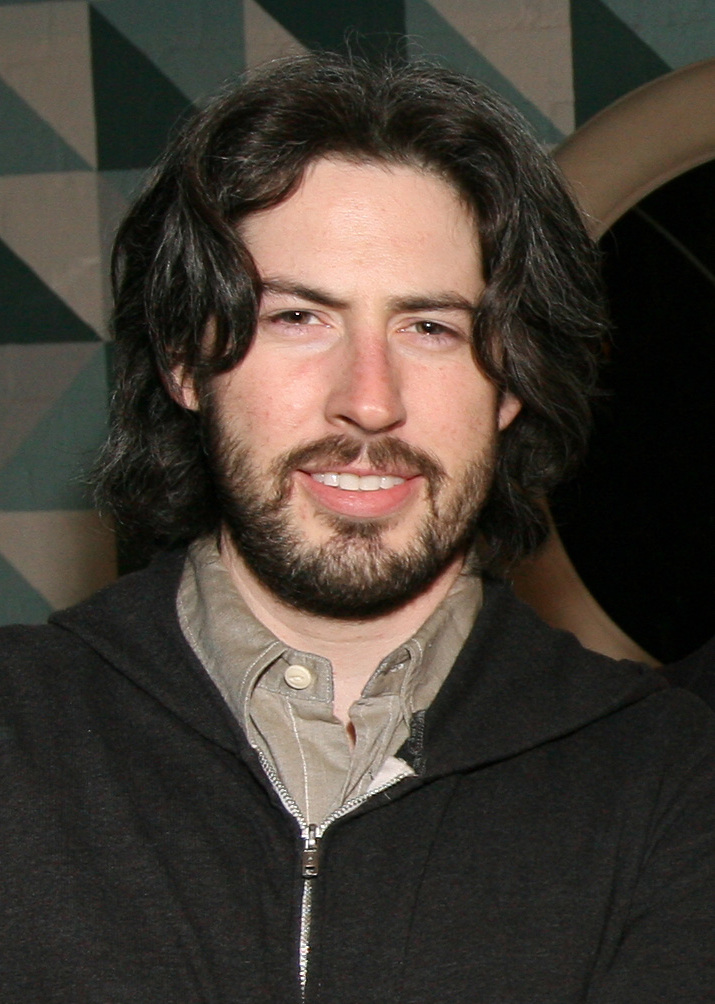
Reitman in 2012

Before his feature film career began, Jason Reitman wrote and directed six short films. He financed his first short film, Operation, with money he made by selling ads in desk calendars. The film premiered at the Sundance Film Festival in 1998. He was a guest on The Howard Stern Show on April 10, 2008; when he was asked if he would direct Ghostbusters III and cast Howard, he said: "Do you know how many times I get asked if I want to do Ghostbusters III? Looking at my career so far, I mean, if you just looked at my two films, I would make the most boring Ghostbusters movie. It would just be people talking about ghosts, there wouldn't be any ghost-busting in it." Stern, a friend of Ivan Reitman, also revealed that he had seen Jason's early short films and was impressed enough to offer him the opportunity to direct an episode of Son of the Beach (a TV series he produced, a goofy parody of Baywatch), which Jason declined, citing that he was busy obtaining financing for Thank You for Smoking at the time.

Reitman produced and directed the 2007 holiday season commercials for Wal-Mart with advertising agency Bernstein-Rein. He has also directed ads for Burger King, Nintendo, BMW and Buick. In television, Reitman directed two episodes of The Office: "Local Ad" and "Frame Toby". Reitman also directed a three-part pretaped sketch for the NBC show Saturday Night Live called "Death by Chocolate," about a walking candy bar, played by episode host Ashton Kutcher, who murders people; stabbing a homeless man, shooting a doctor, cutting off a life support machine on a coma victim and slicing Andy Samberg (dressed as a lumberjack) with a chainsaw. Since 2011, Reitman has directed the Live Read series, a monthly live staged reading of film scripts as part of the Film Independent at LACMA. In 2020, Reitman directed The Princess Bride, a television adaptation of novel of the same name for Quibi featuring an ensemble cast to raise money for World Central Kitchen.

== Personal life ==
Reitman is a self-described libertarian. He is a dual citizen of Canada and the United States. When Reitman was 16 and still in high school, he moved in with a woman 10 years his senior. They separated after 7 years.

In 2000, when he was 23, Reitman and his next-door neighbor, writer Michele Lee began dating. They co-wrote the 2004 comedic short Consent. Their daughter, Josie, was born in 2006. After 10 years of marriage, Reitman filed for divorce in June 2011 and as of 2014 is divorced. Reitman is currently in a relationship with Lorraine Nicholson.

== Filmography ==
=== Short film ===
Year	Title	Director	Writer	Producer	Actor	Role	Notes
1998	Operation	Yes	Yes	Yes	Yes	Woodsy Freedom Fighter	
1999	H@	Yes	Yes	No	No		
2000	In God We Trust	Yes	Yes	executive	Yes	W.F.F.	
2001	Gulp	Yes	Yes	No	No		
2002	Uncle Sam	Yes	Yes	No	No		Documentary short
2004	Consent	Yes	Yes	No	No		

=== Feature film ===
Year	Title	Director	Writer	Producer
2005	Thank You for Smoking	Yes	Yes	No
2007	Juno	Yes	No	No
2009	Up in the Air	Yes	Yes	Yes
2011	Young Adult	Yes	No	Yes
2013	Labor Day	Yes	Yes	Yes
2014	Men, Women & Children	Yes	Yes	Yes
2018	Tully	Yes	No	Yes
2018	The Front Runner	Yes	Yes	Yes
2021	Ghostbusters: Afterlife	Yes	Yes	No
2024	Ghostbusters: Frozen Empire	No	Yes	Yes
2024	Saturday Night	Yes	Yes	Yes

Executive producer

- Chloe (2009)
- Ceremony (2010)
- Whiplash (2014)
- Demolition (2015)

Producer

- Jennifer's Body (2009)
- Jeff, Who Lives at Home (2011)

Acting roles

Year	Title	Role
1988	Twins	Granger Grandson
1989	Ghostbusters II	Brownstone Boy #2
1990	Kindergarten Cop	Kissing Boy
1993	Dave	Vice-president's Son
1997	Fathers' Day	Wrong Kid in Alley

=== Television ===
Year	Title	Notes
2007–2008	The Office	Episodes "Local Ad" and "Frame Toby"
2015	Casual	Also executive producer
2020	Home Movie: The Princess Bride	Miniseries

== Awards and nominations ==
Academy Awards

Year	Title	Category	Result
2008	Juno	Best Director	Nominated
2010	Up in the Air	Best Picture	Nominated
2010	Up in the Air	Best Director	Nominated
2010	Up in the Air	Best Adapted Screenplay	Nominated

BAFTA Awards

Year	Title	Category	Result
2010	Up in the Air	Best Film	Nominated
2010	Up in the Air	Best Adapted Screenplay	Won

Golden Globe Awards

Year	Title	Category	Result
2010	Up in the Air	Best Director	Nominated
2010	Up in the Air	Best Screenplay	Won

Other awards

Year	Award	Category	Title	Result
2005	Independent Spirit Awards	Best Screenplay	Thank You for Smoking	Won
2005	Las Vegas Film Critics Society Awards	Best Screenplay	Thank You for Smoking	Won
2005	National Board of Review	Best Directorial Debut	Thank You for Smoking	Won
2005	Norwegian International Film Festival	Audience Award	Thank You for Smoking	Won
2005	San Diego Film Critics Society	Best Adapted Screenplay	Thank You for Smoking	Won
2005	Toronto Film Critics Association	Best First Feature	Thank You for Smoking	Won
2005	Washington D.C. Area Film Critics Association	Best Adapted Screenplay	Thank You for Smoking	Won
2005	Chicago Film Critics Association	Best Adapted Screenplay	Thank You for Smoking	Nominated
2005	Chicago Film Critics Association	Most Promising Director	Thank You for Smoking	Nominated
2005	Online Film Critics Society	Best Breakthrough Filmmaker	Thank You for Smoking	Nominated
2005	Online Film Critics Society	Best Adapted Screenplay	Thank You for Smoking	Nominated
2005	Satellite Awards	Best Adapted Screenplay	Thank You for Smoking	Nominated
2005	Writers Guild of America	Best Adapted Screenplay	Thank You for Smoking	Nominated
2007	Alpe d'Huez International Comedy Film Festival Grand Prix		Juno	Won
2007	Canadian Comedy Awards	Best Direction	Juno	Won
2007	Christopher Award	Feature Films	Juno	Won
2007	Gijón International Film Festival	Special Prize of the Young Jury	Juno	Won
2007	Grammy Award	Best Compilation Soundtrack for Visual Media	Juno	Won
2007	Palm Springs International Film Festival	Chairman's Vanguard Award	Juno	Won
2007	Rome Film Fest	Golden Marc'Aurelio Award	Juno	Won
2007	St. Louis International Film Festival	Audience Choice Award for Best Feature	Juno	Won
2007	Stockholm Film Festival	Audience Award	Juno	Won
2007	Toronto International Film Festival	People's Choice Award	Juno	2nd place
2007	Vancouver Film Critics Circle	Best Director	Juno	Nominated
2007	Academy of Motion Picture Arts and Sciences of Argentina	Best Foreign Film	Juno	Nominated
2007	Amanda Award	Best Foreign Feature Film	Juno	Nominated
2007	Argentinean Film Critics Association Award	Best Foreign Film, Not in the Spanish Language	Juno	Nominated
2007	Bodil Awards	Best American Film	Juno	Nominated
2007	Chicago Film Critics Association	Best Director	Juno	Nominated
2007	Gijón International Film Festival	Best Feature	Juno	Nominated
2007	Independent Spirit Awards	Best Director	Juno	Nominated
2007	Italian National Syndicate of Film Journalists	Best Non-European Director	Juno	Nominated
2007	Robert Award	Best American Film	Juno	Nominated
2009	AFI Award	Movie of the Year	Up in the Air	Won
2009	Austin Film Critics Award	Best Adapted Screenplay	Up in the Air	Won
2009	Critics' Choice Movie Awards	Best Adapted Screenplay	Up in the Air	Won
2009	Chicago Film Critics Association	Best Director	Up in the Air	Nominated
2009	Chicago Film Critics Association	Best Screenplay	Up in the Air	Won
2009	Dallas-Fort Worth Film Critics Association	Best Director	Up in the Air	Won
2009	Dallas-Fort Worth Film Critics Association	Best Screenplay	Up in the Air	Won
2009	Florida Film Critics Circle	Best Director	Up in the Air	Won
2009	Kansas City Film Critics Circle	Best Adapted Screenplay	Up in the Air	Won
2009	Los Angeles Film Critics Association	Best Screenplay	Up in the Air	Won
2009	National Board of Review	Best Adapted Screenplay	Up in the Air	Won
2009	New York Film Critics Circle	Best Screenplay	Up in the Air	2nd place
2009	PEN Center USA West Literary Award		Up in the Air	Won
2009	Palm Springs International Film FestivalAward	Director of the Year Award	Up in the Air	Won
2009	Phoenix Film Critics Society Award	Best Adapted Screenplay	Up in the Air	Won
2009	San Diego Film Critics Society Award	Best Adapted Screenplay	Up in the Air	2nd place
2009	Southeastern Film Critics Association Award	Best Adapted Screenplay	Up in the Air	Won
2009	Toronto Film Critics Association Award	Best Screenplay (tied with Quentin Tarantino for Inglourious Basterds)	Up in the Air	Won
2009	USC Scripter Award (shared with Walter Kirn)		Up in the Air	Won
2009	Vancouver Film Critics Circle Award	Best Director	Up in the Air	Nominated
2009	Vancouver Film Critics Circle Award	Best Screenplay	Up in the Air	Won
2009	Washington DC Area Film Critics Association Award	Best Director	Up in the Air	Nominated
2009	Washington DC Area Film Critics Association Award	Best Adapted Screenplay	Up in the Air	Won
2009	Writers Guild of America	Best Adapted Screenplay	Up in the Air	Won
2009	Broadcast Film Critics Association	Best Director	Up in the Air	Nominated
2009	David di Donatello Award	Best Foreign Film	Up in the Air	Nominated
2009	Directors Guild of America	Outstanding Directing – Feature film	Up in the Air	Nominated
2009	Italian National Syndicate of Film Journalists	Best Non-European Director	Up in the Air	Nominated
2009	London Critics Circle	Best Director of the Year	Up in the Air	Nominated
2009	Online Film Critics Society Award	Best Adapted Screenplay	Up in the Air	Nominated
2009	Producers Guild of America Award	Best Motion Picture Producer of the Year Award	Up in the Air	Nominated
2009	Robert Award	Best American Film	Up in the Air	Nominated
2009	Rome Film Fest	Golden Marc'Aurelio Award	Up in the Air	Nominated
2009	Satellite Award	Best Adapted Screenplay	Up in the Air	Nominated
2009	Southeastern Film Critics Association Award	Best Director	Up in the Air	Nominated
2009	Stockholm Film Festival	Bronze Horse Award	Up in the Air	Nominated
2011	Palm Springs International Film Festival	Chairman's Vanguard Award (shared with Charlize Theron, Patton Oswalt and Diablo Cody)	Young Adult	Won

Accolades received by Reitman's directed films
Year	Title	Academy Awards		BAFTAs		Golden Globes	
Year	Title	Nominations	Wins	Nominations	Wins	Nominations	Wins
2005	Thank You for Smoking					2	
2007	Juno	4	1	2	1	3	
2009	Up in the Air	6		6	1	6	1
2011	Young Adult					1	
2013	Labor Day					1	
2018	Tully					1	
2021	Ghostbusters: Afterlife			1			
2024	Saturday Night					1	
Total		10	1	9	2	15	1

Directed Academy Award performances

Year	Performer	Film	Result
Academy Award for Best Actor
2010	George Clooney	Up in the Air	Nominated
Academy Award for Best Actress
2008	Elliot Page (Note: Credited as Ellen Page)	Juno	Nominated
Academy Award for Best Supporting Actress
2010	Vera Farmiga	Up in the Air	Nominated
2010	Anna Kendrick	Up in the Air	Nominated

== See also ==
- List of oldest and youngest Academy Award winners and nominees — youngest nominees for Best Director
- List of Jewish Academy Award winners and nominees
