= Thumbsucker (film) =

- Theatrical release poster
- Directed by: Mike Mills
- Screenplay by: Mike Mills
- Based on: Thumbsucker by Walter Kirn
- Produced by: Anthony Bregman; Bob Stephenson
- Starring: Lou Pucci; Tilda Swinton; Vincent D'Onofrio; Keanu Reeves
- Cinematography: Joaquin Baca-Asay
- Edited by: Haines Hall; Angus Wall
- Music by: The Polyphonic Spree; Elliott Smith
- Production companies: Bob Yari Productions; This is that; Cinema Go-Go; Bull's Eye Entertainment
- Distributed by: Sony Pictures Classics
- Release dates: January 23, 2005 (Sundance); September 16, 2005
- Running time: 95 minutes
- Country: United States
- Language: English
- Budget: $3 million
- Box office: $2.1 million

Thumbsucker is a 2005 American independent comedy-drama film written and directed by Mike Mills in his feature directorial debut. The film stars Lou Taylor Pucci, Tilda Swinton, Vincent D'Onofrio, Kelli Garner, Benjamin Bratt, Vince Vaughn, and Keanu Reeves. The plot focuses on Justin Cobb, a teenager in suburban Oregon, as he copes with his thumb-sucking problem, romance, and his diagnosis of ADHD, as well as his subsequent experience using Ritalin. The screenplay was adapted from the 1999 Walter Kirn novel of the same name. Tilda Swinton also served as an executive producer.

The film was shot on location in the Portland metropolitan area in 2003, and premiered at the Sundance Film Festival in January 2005. It received a limited release in the United States on September 16, 2005.

== Plot ==
Justin Cobb is a shy 17-year-old in a family of four, in suburban Oregon. He has a persistent thumb-sucking habit, that his father disapproves of, which has led to major orthodontic repair. He addresses his parents by their first names, Mike and Audrey, so as not to make his father feel old. Audrey, a registered nurse, is idly fascinated by actor, Matt Schramm, entering a contest to win a date with him. She insists it is "innocent fun," but is inordinately concerned with looking attractive for the contest.

Justin struggles on his school's debate team, led by Mr. Geary, which he joined to get closer to his environmentalist classmate, Rebecca. He tries to start a relationship with her, but she rejects him after he cannot open up to her about his thumb-sucking habit.

At a regular checkup, Justin's orthodontist, Dr. Perry Lyman, indicates he can tell that Justin is still sucking his thumb, and attempts hypnosis, coaching Justin to find his power animal (a deer) and suggesting that his thumb will taste like echinacea. This works, and Justin finds his thumb distasteful, but falls deeper into frustration without the crutch. After Justin conspires with his brother to disrupt Dr. Lyman in a bicycle race with Justin's father, his school counselor prods the Cobbs to give him Ritalin. While his parents wring their hands over the idea, Justin insists that he needs the help.

Almost immediately after beginning treatment, Justin experiences elevated energy, confidence and focus. He begins to excel on the debate team, unseating Rebecca from the star position; she quits the team and drifts into the stoners crowd. Justin's newfound aggression nets the debate team repeated awards. Simultaneously, he begins to challenge the neuroses of the adults around him, especially their struggles with aging. With a somewhat deceitful cover letter, he applies to NYU, despite his mother's urging that he go to college closer to home.

After rambling incoherently at the state debate championship, Justin quits the debate team, throws away the pills, and seeks out Rebecca to hook him up with pot. During their smoking sessions, Rebecca blindfolds him and engages with him in kissing and other sexual activity, which Justin interprets as a relationship. But when he broaches the subject, Rebecca tells him otherwise, calling their meetings an "experiment." She tells him to leave, and he returns home.

Both Justin and his father suspect that Audrey is having an affair with Schramm, after she is transferred to a celebrity rehab facility where Schramm has been committed. Attempting to catch his mother in the act, he instead meets Schramm sneaking a smoke in the bushes and learns the unromantic truth. The next day, he receives an acceptance letter from NYU.

During a final checkup, Dr. Lyman reveals to Justin his discovery that thumb-sucking is not a medically debilitating problem, and says that everyone has their own flaws and nobody has all the answers—that in fact learning to live without having the answers is (perhaps) the answer. On his flight to New York, Justin dreams of reaching his goal of being a TV anchor, "sharing the truth with the world " He wakes up after sleeptalking to find his thumb in his mouth and an attractive girl smiling at him. Slightly embarrassed, but self-confident, he introduces himself.

== Cast ==
- Lou Taylor Pucci as Justin Cobb
  - Colton Tanner as 10-year-old Justin
  - Mason Bromberg as 4-year-old Justin
- Tilda Swinton as Audrey Cobb
- Vincent D'Onofrio as Mike Cobb
- Keanu Reeves as Dr. Perry Lyman
- Kelli Garner as Rebecca
- Benjamin Bratt as Matt Schramm
- Vince Vaughn as Mr. Geary
- Chase Offerle as Joel Cobb
- Kit Koenig as Principal
- Nancy O'Dell as herself
- Walter Kirn (cameo) as Debate judge

== Production ==
=== Casting ===
Lou Taylor Pucci was cast in the lead role of Justin after director Mills auditioned around 150 teenage actors. Swinton was cast as his mother, Audrey, after meeting director Mills eighteen months before the production: "I met Mike 18 months ago. We started a conversation, and it kept going." D'Onofrio was cast as Justin's father, Mike, after being impressed by the script, as he felt it "was a tough story to tell." Reeves was cast in the supporting role of Perry Lyman, and completed his work in the film over four days. Initially, Matthew McConaughey was attached to star as Justin's debate team coach, Mr. Geary, but was replaced by Vince Vaughn due to a scheduling conflict.

=== Filming ===
The film is set in the fictional town of Beaverwood, Oregon, while the source novel had originally been set in Minnesota. Initially, the producers had planned to shoot the film in Vancouver, British Columbia, but the production was incentivized to shoot in Oregon after Governor Ted Kulongoski promised a rebate matching the filming costs of Canada.

Filming took place in the summer of 2003 in the Portland metropolitan area, beginning in June and completing in late August. Locations included Portland, Tualatin, Beaverton, Sherwood, Vernonia, and Tigard. The school sequences were shot at Tualatin High School in Tualatin. During filming, Swinton had her twin sons on set with her, and spent time in between filming at Trillium Lake, and Pucci celebrated his 18th birthday during filming. The final scene in which Justin runs through the New York University campus was shot in New York City, and is the only scene not shot in Oregon.

== Release ==
=== Critical response ===
Review aggregator Rotten Tomatoes gives Thumbsucker a score of 70% based on 115 reviews, with an average rating of 7/10. The site's consensus is: "Though quirky coming-of-age themes are common in indie films, this one boasts a smart script and a great cast."

Steven Rea of The Philadelphia Inquirer gave it three-and-a-half stars out of four, calling it a "quiet, quirky gem" and "terrific". Roger Ebert of the Chicago Sun-Times gave it three stars out of four, writing "I have focused on Justin, but really the movie is equally about the adult characters, who all seem to have lacked adequate parenting themselves. We talk about the tragedy of children giving birth to children; maybe that can happen at any age." New York Magazine's Ken Tucker commented on the film's poignancy, writing: "One of the wonderful things about Thumbsucker is that, unlike so many movies in which a character changes to propel the plot forward, this one stops to follow up on the consequences of those changes."

A.O. Scott of The New York Times praised the performances in the film, adding that "Mills, who wrote and directed, keeps the film from slipping either into melodrama or facile satire, the two traps into which this genre is most apt to fall." Kevin Thomas of the Los Angeles Times was less laudatory of the film, noting: "Although the intellectual level of Thumbsucker is quite a few cuts above many teen angst movies and the film boasts several impressively nuanced portrayals as well, it is not sufficiently distinctive to stand wholly apart from the pack. Furthermore, its literary roots peek through rather too often in dialogue that might play well on the page but doesn't sound real when coming out of the mouths of actors."

== Soundtrack ==
The soundtrack to the film was originally to consist of several cover songs performed by Elliott Smith, but he died before the project's completion. Tim DeLaughter and The Polyphonic Spree were then chosen to compose an original soundtrack after Mills attended one of their shows and was impressed. Three of Smith's songs remain on the soundtrack.
