= David Samuels (writer) =

American non-fiction and fiction writer (born 1967)

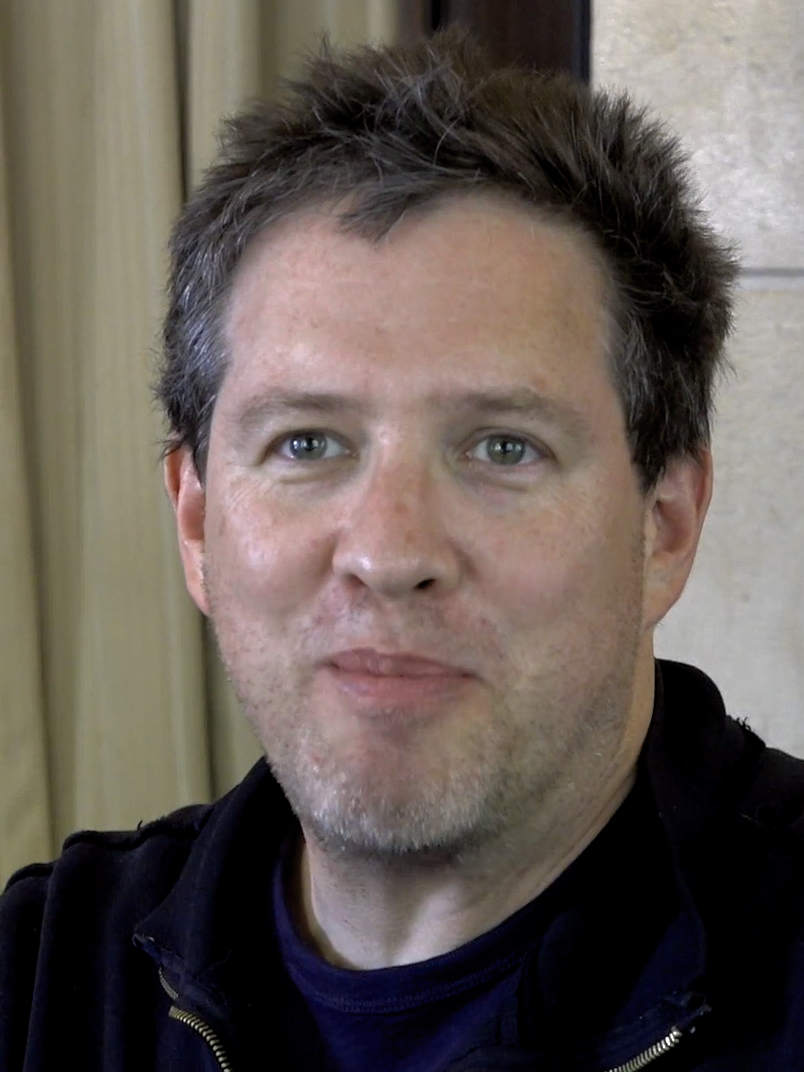
- David Samuels in 2015
- Born: Brooklyn, New York
- Occupations: Non-fiction writer, journalist
- Spouse: Alana Newhouse
- Children: 3
- Writing career
- Period: 1967–present
- Notable works: Only Love Can Break Your Heart (2008); The Runner (2008)

David Samuels (born 1967) is an American non-fiction and fiction writer. He is the editor of County Highway, a magazine in the form of a 19th-century American broadsheet which he founded with Walter Kirn. He is a contributing writer at The New York Times Magazine, a longtime contributing editor at Harper's Magazine; a contributor to The Atlantic, n+1, The New Yorker and other magazines; and the literary editor of Tablet.

== Background and education ==
Samuels grew up in Brooklyn, New York. In 1989, he graduated with a BA degree in history from Harvard College, where he was an editor of the Harvard Lampoon. He became a Mellon Fellow in the Humanities at Princeton University, where he received a master's degree in history in 1993.

== Career ==
=== Early years ===
Samuels' first article to receive much public attention was a controversial 1991 cover story on rap music in The New Republic; the piece contended that the primary hip-hop audience consisted of white suburban teens and has been widely anthologized. An article he wrote later about rap music for The New Yorker was reprinted in the Best Music Writing of 2000 collection, edited by Peter Guralnick. His writing has also been anthologized in Best American Political Writing of 2004, Best American Science and Nature Writing of 2006, and other collections.

=== Magazines ===
Samuels was a contributing editor at Harper's Magazine from 1996 to 2018. He has written over a dozen features for The New Yorker. His articles have been cover stories for The Atlantic and the New York Times Magazine. His work is a throwback to the New Journalism of the 1960s—a blend of first-person observation, detailed reporting, and a careful attention to language. His pieces for Harper's are often panoramic takes on a single event including the demolition of the Sands Hotel and Casino in Las Vegas, the riot at Woodstock 1999, a Donald Rumsfeld press conference at the Pentagon, and Super Bowl XL in Detroit. His features for The New Yorker and The Atlantic often focus on extreme subcultures and individuals with double identities. He was a finalist for the National Magazine Award in reporting for his long profile article of Yasser Arafat for The Atlantic in September 2005 and it was named as one of the three most important articles of the year by David Brooks, a columnist in The New York Times. After publishing a controversial cover story in The Atlantic's April 2008 issue about paparazzi who trail Britney Spears, Samuels appeared on NPR's On the Media and apologized for hurting the feelings of those subscribers who objected to finding Spears on the cover of the magazine. "Yes, I want to take full responsibility for destroying The Atlantic, (an) 150-year-old pillar of American journalism," he said. "... now it's gone, thanks to me."

To open his long profile of the rapper Kanye West titled "American Mozart" in the May 2012 issue of The Atlantic, Samuels told of meeting President Barack Obama at a fundraiser at the Manhattan restaurant Daniel and asking him who he liked better–West or his Watch the Throne collaborator Jay-Z. Obama said that he preferred Jay-Z, but he thought that West was "smart" and "very talented." When Samuels recalled that Obama had previously called West a "jackass," Obama replied "He is a jackass. But he's talented". An angry minority of Atlantic subscribers wrote to the magazine to express their bafflement at the comparison of West with Mozart.

In the April 12, 2010 issue of The New Yorker, Samuels published an account of his contacts with the Pink Panthers, a group of jewel thieves from Serbia and Montenegro who have reportedly stolen watches and jewels worth an estimated $250 million. The article, entitled "The Pink Panthers", was an idiosyncratic travelogue which detailed the group's cinematic robberies against the backdrop of recent Balkan history. The style of the Panthers piece got Samuels a rebuke from Pietry Calcaterra–the chief of Interpol's Pink Panthers unit–who wrote a letter of complaint to The New Yorker saying, "The victim is not the man wielding the gun, however colourful his alleged derring-do. The victim in an armed robbery is the person lying on a shop floor with a gun pointed at his head."

His immersive profile of White House speechwriter and Deputy National Security Advisor Ben Rhodes, published in the May 8, 2016 issue of The New York Times Magazine, examined the use of traditional narrative techniques in the making and selling of American foreign policy in the age of social media. The article ignited a firestorm in the digital press, which was harshly criticized in the article by both Rhodes and Samuels, leading to an unusual response by Samuels to his critics in the pages of the Times titled "Through the Looking Glass With Ben Rhodes". On August 20, 2019, Samuels published a highly personal account of an encounter with the musician Neil Young in The New York Times Magazine in which the writer described his youngest son's struggle with a sensory processing disorder.

== Style ==
In The New York Observer, critic Matt Haber called Samuels "a master of the new old journalism." In the same publication, critic Michael Washburn said Samuels' work in The Runner and Only Love is "thrilling"; "With an intelligence and unsparing lucidity reminiscent of Joan Didion, Mr. Samuels has written some of the best long-form literary journalism of the past decade." A critic, John Palattella, wrote in a long review essay in The Nation that Samuels' achievement was "staggering" comparing his work favorably to Didion and Tom Wolfe: "Like Didion, Samuels investigates the vortex of American life, a feeling of weightlessness and existential drift that can swallow people whole, but he reports on it in an entirely different manner."

Reviewing The Runner for The New York Times, Keith Gessen wrote "Samuels is an elite narrative journalist, a master at teasing out the social and moral implications of the smallest small talk." Writing separately in the same publication about Only Love Can Break Your Heart, Jascha Hoffman described the collection as "a tribute to the twin American traditions of self-invention and self-deceit" and the author as "a brilliant reporter who has made a career of observing 'our national gift for self-delusion and for making ourselves up from scratch.'" In the Los Angeles Times, critic Richard Rayner cited the author's "wonderful feeling for the weirdness and truths of self-contained worlds". Rayner continued, "the writing is Joseph Mitchell-meets-Elmore Leonard, and a whole subculture comes to life... Samuels is heir to an American tradition."

In The Village Voice, James Hannaham wrote Samuels "has nearly (an) autistic command of minor details and facts" and "achieves the glorious breadth and detail of a mural painter." Contrary to most critics, Hannahan preferred Samuels' book The Runner to his collected journalism in Only Love Can Break Your Heart, calling the book "terse, passionate and complicated" and criticizing Samuels' political writing for "a creepy lack of bias."

Seul l'amour peut te briser le coeur, the 2018 French version of his earlier (2008) collection of journalism Only Love Can Break Your Heart, covering the years 1994–2016, received laudatory coverage in the French press who dubbed Samuels the inventor of "neo-gonzo journalism".

== Personal life ==
Samuels is married to Alana Newhouse and lives in New York.

== Works ==
=== Books ===
- 2008: Only Love Can Break Your Heart, a collection of Samuels' journalism
  - 2018: Seul l'amour peut te briser le coeur, French language collection of two decades' worth of his articles (1994–2016)
- 2008: The Runner: A True Account of the Amazing Lies and Fantastical Adventures of the Ivy League Impostor James Hogue, based on his 2001 The New Yorker profile of the university confidence man James Hogue, ISBN 159558188X
  - 2015: Mentir à perdre haleine, French translation

=== Presence in anthologies ===
- The Best American Music Writing, 2000
- The Best American Political Writing, 2004
- The Best American Science and Nature Writing, 2006
