= Walter Kirn =

American novelist (born 1962)

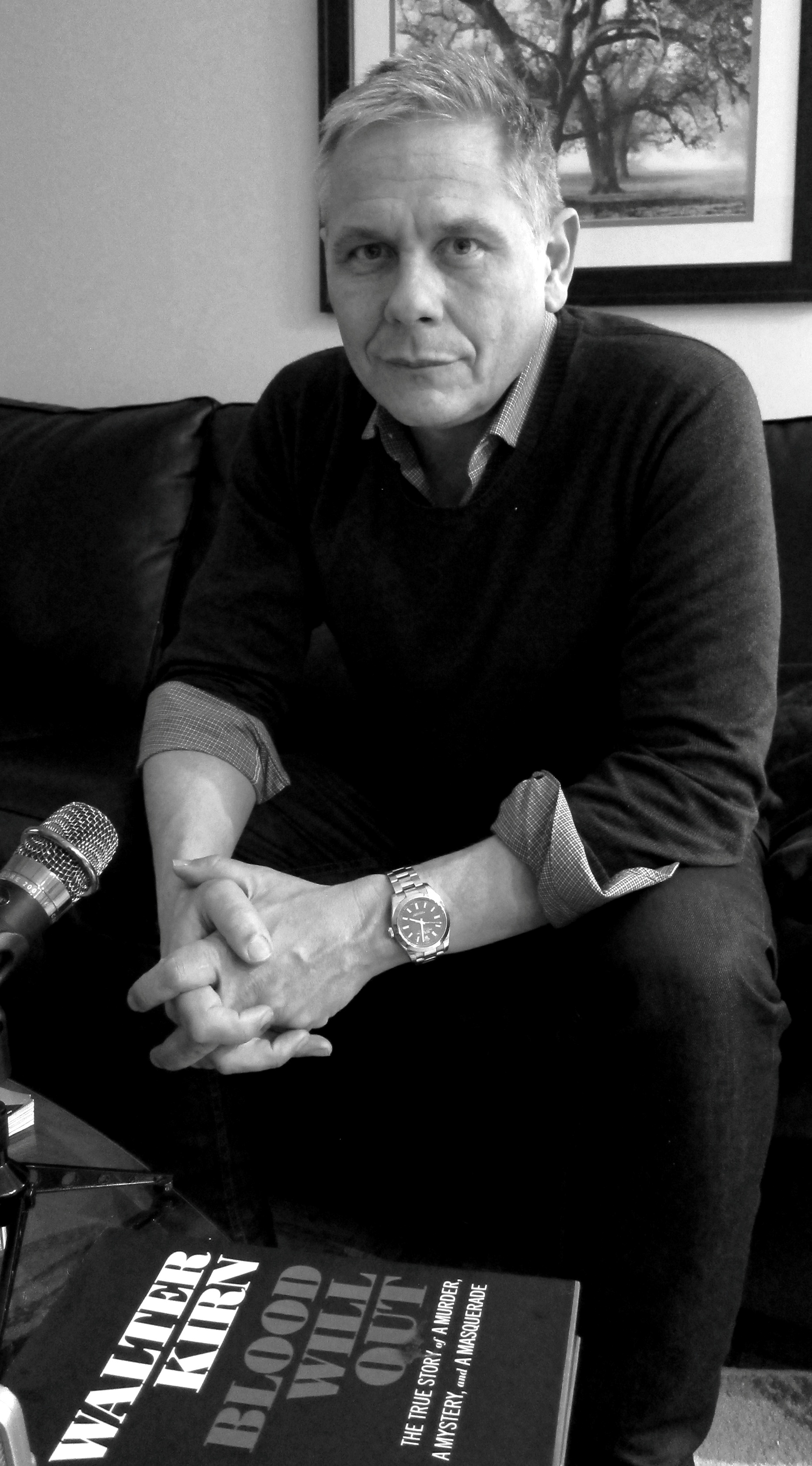
- Kirn on March 1, 2015
- Born: Walter Norris Kirn; August 3, 1962 (age 64); Akron, Ohio, U.S.
- Education: Princeton University (AB); Oxford University
- Occupations: Novelist; literary critic; essayist
- Notable work: Thumbsucker; Up in the Air
- Spouse(s): Penelope Locke (divorced); Maggie McGuane (divorced); Amanda Fortini
- Children: 2

Walter Norris Kirn (born August 3, 1962) is an American novelist, literary critic, and essayist. He is the author of eight books, most notably Up in the Air, which was made into a film of the same name starring George Clooney.

== Education ==
Kirn graduated with an A.B. in English from Princeton University in 1983 after completing a 22-page-long senior thesis entitled "Entangling Breaths (Poems)." In 1985, he obtained an undergraduate degree in English Language and Literature at Trinity College Oxford University, where he was a Keasbey Memorial Foundation Scholar.

== Writing ==
Kirn has published a collection of short stories and several novels. These include Thumbsucker (1999), which was made into a 2005 film featuring Keanu Reeves and Vince Vaughn. Kirn's 2001 novel, Up in the Air, has been characterized as a literary chronotope relating to the genre of road narratives. It was made into a 2009 film directed by Jason Reitman. Starring George Clooney and Anna Kendrick, it was a commercial success and went on to receive critical acclaim as well as numerous nominations and awards.

In 2005, Kirn took over blogger Andrew Sullivan's blog The Dish while Sullivan was on vacation. He also wrote The Unbinding, an Internet-only novel that was published in Slate magazine.

Kirn's 2013 memoir, Blood Will Out, is an account of his relationship with the convicted murderer and imposter Christian Gerhartsreiter, who had initially approached Kirn using the alias "Clark Rockefeller".

He has also reviewed books for New York Magazine and has written for the New York Times Book Review, the New York Times Sunday Magazine, The Atlantic and Spy, and is a contributing editor for Time, where he has gained popularity for his entertaining and sometimes humorous first-person essays, among other articles of interest. He also served as an American cultural correspondent for the BBC.

In 2023, Kirn and David Samuels launched County Highway, a magazine about America in the form of a nineteenth-century newspaper. Donald Rosenfeld is the publisher.

Since 2022, Kirn has been co-hosting the America This Week podcast with Matt Taibbi.

On the January 10, 2025, episode of the podcast, Kirn said he had finished writing a screenplay titled In Recent Times, which he described as "basically a holistic view of how [California] works from a satirical point of view."

On the March 28, 2025, episode of the podcast, Kirn said: "I accepted a job to write a movie based on [Jay Bhattacharya's] story ... It’s a satirical movie. It’s loosely based on his life, his adventure. It’s kind of like Network or Dr. Strangelove in tone. It satirizes the entire COVID era, but from an angle—my disease is a rash, a skin condition, not a cough ... I simply wanted to tell the story of someone who stood up at a time of what I would consider mass hysteria, had no idea how it would turn out." On the October 3, 2025, episode, he announced that the film is called The Rash, and fundraising was in progress. In 2026, Nicole Shanahan, the running mate of Robert F. Kennedy Jr. in the 2024 US presidential election, was reported to be helping to secure investors for the project.

== Teaching ==
In addition to teaching nonfiction writing at the University of Montana, Kirn was the 2008–09 Vare Nonfiction Writer in Residence at the University of Chicago.

== Media ==
Kirn appears on the weekly podcast America This Week with Matt Taibbi. He is a weekly regular panelist on Gutfeld! He had a cameo appearance in Up in the Air as a boardroom member.

== Personal life ==
Kirn was born in Akron, Ohio, but grew up in Marine on St. Croix, Minnesota. After high school, he attended Macalester College for one year before transferring to Princeton University. Kirn's family joined the Church of Jesus Christ of Latter-day Saints when he was twelve, but Kirn is no longer affiliated with the church. In 1995, Kirn married Maggie McGuane, the daughter of actress Margot Kidder and novelist Thomas McGuane. The couple had two children but have since divorced. Kirn is now married to magazine writer Amanda Fortini. The two split their time between Livingston, Montana, and Las Vegas, Nevada.

== Books ==
=== Fiction ===
==== Novels ====
- She Needed Me (1992)
- Thumbsucker (1999)
- Up in the Air (2001)
- Mission to America (2005)
- The Unbinding (2006)

==== Short fiction collections ====
- My Hard Bargain: Stories (1990)

=== Nonfiction ===
- Lost in the Meritocracy: The Undereducation of an Overachiever (2009)
- Blood Will Out: The True Story of a Murder, a Mystery, and a Masquerade (2013)

== Filmography ==
- Thumbsucker (2005)
- Up in the Air (2009)
