= Up in the Air (2009 film) =

2009 film by Jason Reitman

- Theatrical release poster
- Directed by: Jason Reitman
- Screenplay by: Jason Reitman; Sheldon Turner
- Based on: Up in the Air by Walter Kirn
- Produced by: Daniel Dubiecki; Jeffrey Clifford; Ivan Reitman; Jason Reitman; Joe Medjuck
- Starring: George Clooney; Vera Farmiga; Anna Kendrick; Danny McBride
- Cinematography: Eric Steelberg
- Edited by: Dana E. Glauberman
- Music by: Rolfe Kent
- Production companies: DW Studios; The Montecito Picture Company; Cold Spring Pictures; Rickshaw Productions; Right of Way Films
- Distributed by: Paramount Pictures
- Release dates: September 5, 2009 (Telluride); December 4, 2009 (United States)
- Running time: 109 minutes
- Country: United States
- Language: English
- Budget: $25 million
- Box office: $166.8 million

Up in the Air is a 2009 American comedy-drama film directed by Jason Reitman and written by Reitman and Sheldon Turner from Walter Kirn's 2001 novel. Starring George Clooney, Vera Farmiga, Anna Kendrick, and Jason Bateman, the story is centered on traveling corporate downsizer Ryan Bingham. Up in the Air was primarily filmed in St. Louis with additional scenes shot in Detroit, Omaha, Las Vegas, and Miami.

Reitman promoted Up in the Air with personal appearances at film festivals, starting with Telluride on September 5, 2009. Following a Los Angeles premiere at the Mann Village Theater on November 30, Paramount Pictures gave Up in the Air a wide release on December 23, 2009.

Up in the Air was met with critical acclaim, for Reitman's screenplay and direction, and the performances by Clooney, Farmiga, and Kendrick. It was also a box office success, grossing $166 million worldwide against a $25 million budget. The film received several accolades, including six nominations each at the Oscars and the Golden Globes, winning Best Screenplay at the latter. A number of critics and publications included Up in the Air on their lists of the best films of 2009.

== Plot ==
Ryan Bingham works for a human resources consultancy firm specializing in employment-termination assistance. His work constantly takes him around the country, conducting company layoffs on behalf of employers. Ryan also gives motivational speeches, using the analogy "What's in Your Backpack?" to extol living free of burdensome relationships and material possessions. A frequent flyer, Ryan aspires to earn ten million frequent flyer miles with American Airlines. While traveling, he meets a woman named Alex Goran, a businesswoman who also flies frequently. They begin a casual relationship, meeting up in various cities as their respective schedules allow.

Ryan is recalled to his company's offices in Omaha. Natalie Keener, a young and ambitious new hire, promotes cutting costs by conducting layoffs via video-conferencing. Ryan raises concerns that the new system is impersonal and undignified, arguing that Natalie lacks understanding about the firing process and how to handle emotionally vulnerable people. His boss, Craig Gregory, has Natalie accompany a reluctant Ryan on his next round of terminations to observe the process.

Ryan tutors Natalie on traveling more efficiently by using smaller luggage and moving quickly through airport security. As they travel together, Natalie challenges Ryan's philosophies on life, particularly regarding relationships and love. During the trip, Natalie's boyfriend unceremoniously dumps her by text message, but Ryan and Alex comfort her. On a video termination test run, Ryan's earlier concerns prove valid when Natalie is unable to properly console a laid-off person who breaks down on camera.

Natalie castigates Ryan for his inability to commit to Alex despite their obvious compatibility, but he dismisses her criticisms and chastises her for lacking empathy and never appreciating her surroundings. Before returning home, Ryan heads to Wisconsin for his sister Julie's wedding, taking Alex as a plus one. He has a strained reunion with his semi-estranged family, who resent his constant absence. When the groom Jim gets cold feet prior to the ceremony, Ryan's older sister Kara asks him to intervene. Although counter to his personal philosophy, Ryan uses his motivational skills to persuade Jim to proceed with the wedding.

Ryan begins questioning his lifestyle and philosophies after the wedding. In Las Vegas for a prestigious speaking engagement, he abruptly walks offstage mid-presentation and impulsively flies to Chicago to see Alex. Arriving at her front door, he is stunned to discover that she is married with children. She later calls him in a fury, bluntly telling him he was just an escape from her real life.

On Ryan's flight home, the crew announces that he has just crossed the ten-million-mile mark. The airline's chief pilot is aboard to personally congratulate Ryan and notes he is the youngest person to achieve the milestone. Back in Omaha, Ryan transfers 500,000 frequent flyer miles to Julie and Jim so they can have a honeymoon world journey.

Craig informs Ryan that an employee he and Natalie had laid-off has taken their own life; upset over the news, Natalie quits via text message upon learning this. The remote-layoff program is stopped and Ryan is sent back on the road.

Natalie applies to the same San Francisco company where she had previously declined a position, due to having followed her now ex-boyfriend to Omaha. Impressed by her qualifications and Ryan's glowing written recommendation, the interviewer hires her. The film concludes with Ryan at the airport, standing in front of a vast destination board, contemplating where he should travel next (something Natalie encouraged him to do earlier). Looking up, he lets go of his luggage.

== Cast ==
- George Clooney as Ryan Bingham, "a suave, smartly dressed businessman in his 40s"
- Vera Farmiga as Alex Goran, a constantly traveling businesswoman
- Anna Kendrick as Natalie Keener, an ambitious 23-year-old woman
- Jason Bateman as Craig Gregory, owner of Career Transition Counseling
- Danny McBride as Jim Miller, Julie's fiancé
- Melanie Lynskey as Julie Bingham, Ryan's younger sister
- Amy Morton as Kara Bingham, Ryan's older sister
- Sam Elliott as Maynard Finch, Chief Pilot
- J. K. Simmons as Bob, a fired employee
- Zach Galifianakis as Steve, a fired employee
- Chris Lowell as Kevin, Ryan's assistant
- Tamala Jones as Karen Barnes, a fired employee
- Adhir Kalyan as a fired IT worker
- Cut Chemist as a conference DJ
- Adam Rose as Makeout Dave
- Art Hill a fired employee

== Production ==
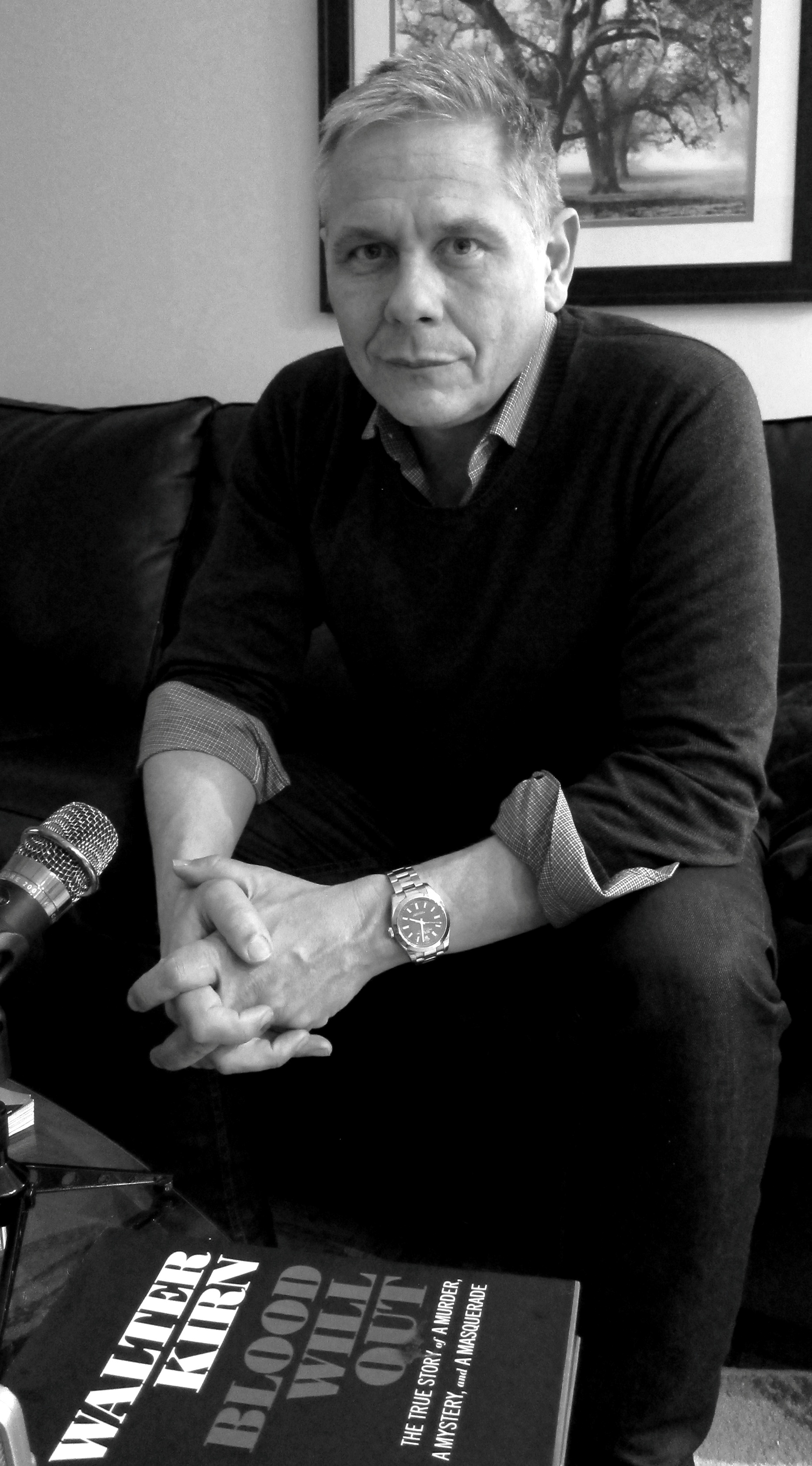
Author Walter Kirn in 2015

=== Background ===
Walter Kirn wrote Up in the Air, the book on which the film is based, during a snowbound winter on a ranch in rural Montana, while thinking about airports, airplanes and first-class passengers he had met who would strongly resemble Ryan Bingham. The novel was published in 2001 and, shortly after, Sheldon Turner discovered the book and wrote a screenplay adaptation, which he sold to DreamWorks in 2003. Kirn can be seen in the film sitting beside Ryan at the initial meeting in Omaha.

Director Jason Reitman later came upon the novel (initially attracted by the Christopher Buckley blurb on the cover) while browsing in the Los Angeles bookstore Book Soup. Reitman persuaded his father, Ivan Reitman, to purchase the book's film rights, and the elder Reitman commissioned a screenplay from Ted Griffin and Nicholas Griffin, who used some elements from Turner's script in their work. Jason Reitman then developed his own screenplay, incorporating some of the original script that was (unbeknownst to Reitman) written by Turner. Some Turner inventions that were used in the film include Ryan's boilerplate termination speech ("Anyone who ever built an empire or changed the world sat where you're sitting right now ..."), a key plot point involving a suicide, and the character of Ryan's partner (written by Turner as a man). Reitman initially attempted to claim sole credit for writing the film, then later admitted to confusion when the Writers Guild of America ruled that he should share credit with Turner, whose script Reitman claimed to have never read. He and Turner later appeared at a WGA event where both said they were happy to share credit, after Turner's contribution to the final product was made clear. At a press screening, Reitman also said that his father Ivan had written "the best line in the movie."

=== Casting ===
Reitman repeatedly stated that he wrote parts specifically for George Clooney, Vera Farmiga, Anna Kendrick, Jason Bateman, Danny McBride, Melanie Lynskey, Amy Morton, Sam Elliott, and Zach Galifianakis. On the part played by Farmiga, he cited her ability to walk a fine line between aggressiveness and femininity. On Kendrick, Reitman cited that he was inspired by her performance in Rocket Science. On Clooney, he said, "If you're going to make a movie about a guy who fires people for a living and you still want to like him, that actor better be damn charming and I don't think there's a more charming actor alive than George Clooney. I was very lucky he said yes." Reitman said, on the B.S. Report with Bill Simmons, that he considered Steve Martin for the part if Clooney declined the role. Reitman said that he would have changed the movie with Martin and given Martin "his Lost in Translation."

Approximately 500 people applied to be extras in the film during the open call on January 24 and 25, 2009, in Crestwood Court in St. Louis, Missouri. Up in the Air cast 2,000 extras with 15 to 25 Missouri actors in minor speaking roles. About 250 extras were used from the Omaha, Nebraska, area. They were used for filming inside and outside the terminal at Eppley Airfield, while Clooney acted out most of his scenes inside the terminal.

While filming in St. Louis and Detroit, Reitman placed an ad in the paper asking if people who recently lost their job wanted to be in a documentary about job loss. He specified "documentary" in the ad so that actors would not respond. Reitman was amazed by how many people of different age, race, and gender were willing to speak frankly about what happened and what a cathartic experience it had been. The film crew received a startling 100 responses, including 60 people filmed (30 in Detroit and 30 in St. Louis). Twenty-two are seen in the film. The interviews ran for about ten minutes on what it was like to lose their job in a poor economy, and after that the interviewer would "fire" them on camera and ask them to either respond the way they did the day they lost their job or, if they preferred, the way they wished they had responded.

=== Filming ===
Filming was mostly done in the St. Louis area. Several scenes were filmed at the Berry and McNamara Terminals at Detroit Metro Airport in late February 2009 with minimal filming in Omaha, in Las Vegas and in Miami, Florida. Missouri and St. Louis leaders provided $4.1 million in tax credits for the $25 million film. Producers set up a St. Louis production office on January 5, 2009. Filming began in St. Louis on March 3, 2009, and continued through the end of April. The film includes 80 different sets at 50 locations throughout the St. Louis area, including St. Louis Lambert International Airport Concourse C and Concourse D (which played the part of several airports across America), the Mansion House apartments in downtown St. Louis, Hilton St. Louis at the Ballpark, Hilton St. Louis Airport, DHR International building (8000 Maryland Ave.), the Cheshire Inn, the GenAmerica building (700 Market), Renaissance Grand Hotel, Maplewood United Methodist Church, and Affton High School. The film shot at Lambert-St. Louis International Airport for five days, twenty hours each day.

In October 2008, Production Services of Omaha scouted locations for three days of filming in late April with Clooney. Some of the scenes were shot inside the Visitor's Bureau and in a condo in the Old Market area of downtown Omaha and at the south end of the main terminal at Eppley Airfield.

Reitman needed fifty days to film Up in the Air, eight of which were devoted to aerial shooting. The aerial shots turned out to be more difficult than expected. He was unable to use material from three days of the aerial filming. Many aerial shots, such as the crop circle on fire, are seen in the Paramount trailer, but are not used in the film. The pilot who flies the Boeing 747 that carried the Space Shuttle flew the aircraft for the aerial shots.

The film features heavy product placement, with American Airlines, Chrysler, Hertz, Travelpro, and Hilton Hotels all featured prominently. Competing brands are displayed as blurs in scene backgrounds or are replaced with pseudonyms in dialogue. However, the brands did not pay for the exposure; rather, they waived the fees for the producers to shoot on location, such as at AA's airport areas and inside Hilton hotels. Reitman expressed his desire to use actual brands as he finds them less distracting.

=== Editing ===
The post-production schedule for Up in the Air was shorter than Jason Reitman's previous two films. The editing team had only 16 to 17 weeks post-schedule, whereas an editing deadline is usually from 22 to 26 weeks. Reitman was involved in post-production while shooting. The film was shot entirely on location and Glauberman stayed in Los Angeles to cut. She would send him scenes every day or every other day as she finished them, and he would view them. He flew home every weekend to work with her for a few hours on Saturday or Sunday in order to stay on schedule.

Editing helped determine how nonverbal moments shape the first meeting between Ryan and Alex, who become lovers. "In a scene like that, there is a sort of playfulness that goes on," editor, Dana E. Glauberman said. "There were little looks that they gave each other. Sometimes I stayed a beat longer on a take to get that little sparkle in their eyes ... You can see a lot of playfulness in the quick cuts back and forth when they are teasing each other, but then there are also certain moments that Vera would give a little raise of an eyebrow, or George would give the same thing. Those tiny nuances are really helpful to show their character and show what they are after."

== Themes ==
The film has a thematic connection to Margery Williams' 1922 children's book The Velveteen Rabbit, which appears in the film, before the wedding.

Reitman noted that

In one sense, it's a movie about a man who fires people for a living. In another sense, it's a movie about a man who collects air miles excessively. In another sense, it's about a man who meets a woman who's so similar to him that even though they both believe in the idea of living solo, they begin to fall in love.

Reitman also later stated that "the movie is about the examination of a philosophy. What if you decided to live hub to hub, with nothing, with nobody?".

== Soundtrack ==
Up in the Air: Music from the Motion Picture is the official soundtrack to the film, released by Warner Music on November 9, 2009, and composed by Rolfe Kent, who recorded his score with a 55-piece ensemble of the Hollywood Studio Symphony at the Sony Scoring Stage. It was orchestrated by Tony Blondal.

There was strong Oscar buzz for "Help Yourself," the original song by Sad Brad Smith, which featured in a pivotal scene of the film, but it was pulled from consideration by Paramount Pictures due to technicalities required by the academy, which some deemed arbitrary. Smith was undiscovered up until that point and had not released any music prior to the film.

Kevin Renick wrote the song "Up in the Air" two years prior to knowing that Reitman was working on a film adaptation to the book. He had been laid off at the time, and was an unrecorded, unemployed St. Louis musician. When Renick researched the film he discovered that the theme of the film was much the same as the song he had written. "The song is about uncertainty, disconnection and loneliness, while alluding to career transition," Renick explained. "It's a melancholy song, and a narrative about finding out where your life's going to go." He handed a cassette to Reitman after the director did an interview at Webster University. Renick included a spoken-word introduction about the song on the cassette so that Reitman would know why he was given the song. Reitman found a tape deck, listened, liked the song and placed the original introduction and song from the cassette midway through the credits. Reitman stated that the song has a do-it-yourself authenticity.

== Release ==
=== Strategy ===
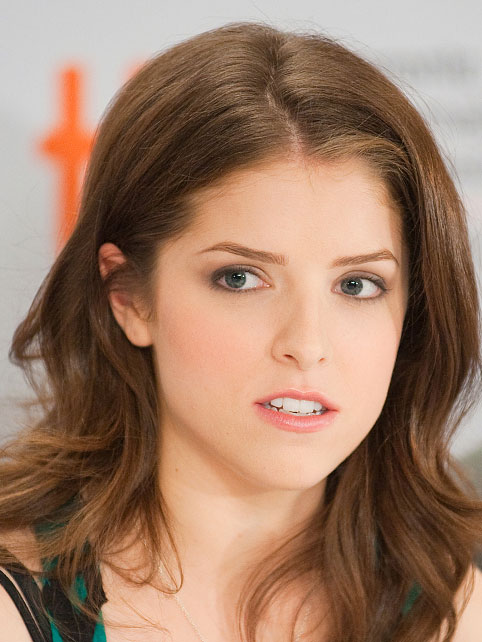
Anna Kendrick at the 2009 Toronto International Film Festival for a panel on the film.

Reitman heavily promoted Up in the Air with personal appearances at film festivals and other showings. He stated that he could relate to and enjoys the idea of Ryan Bingham's lifestyle. "Yesterday [October 28, 2009] I took my 10th flight in 10 days so I live that life myself and I kinda enjoy it," Reitman said, "I think when you're in an airplane it's the last refuge for the people who enjoy being alone and reading a book."

Reitman documented his experiences promoting the film. He took photos of everyone who interviewed him and recorded videos in every city he visited. He edited these images into a short video titled Lost in the Air: The Jason Reitman Press Tour Simulator.

Up in the Air was screened as a "sneak preview" at the Telluride Film Festival on September 5, 2009, before its world premiere at the Toronto International Film Festival (TIFF) on September 12. The film was initially not scheduled to be completed for another three months, but Reitman rushed production in order to maintain a streak of debuting his films at TIFF.

During October and November 2009, Up in the Air screened at festivals including the Aspen Filmfest, the Woodstock Film Festival, the Hamptons International Film Festival, the Mill Valley Film Festival, the Austin Film Festival, the London Film Festival, the St. Louis International Film Festival, the Starz Denver Film Festival, and the Stockholm International Film Festival. It was the only American film to compete for the Golden Marc'Aurelio Audience Award for Best Film at the International Rome Film Festival. On November 6, The New York Times film critic Janet Maslin interviewed Reitman and Kirn at the Jacob Burns Film Center following a screening of the film.

Following the positive response the film received at the Telluride Film Festival, Paramount intended to move Up in the Air from its original release date of December 4, 2009, planning for a November 13 limited release going wide before the Thanksgiving holiday. However, this schedule conflicted with the release of The Men Who Stare at Goats, another Clooney film. The film was eventually released on December 4 in fifteen theaters spanning twelve markets, broadening in the next week to 72 theaters and going into wide release on December 23, 2009. It was released in other countries beginning in early 2010.

==== September 2009 ====
Up in the Air was shown at a sneak preview on September 5, 2009, and September 6, 2009, at the Telluride Film Festival. Reitman had fueled speculation that he would give a sneak preview at that festival. He posted pictures from Telluride on his Twitter account. Prior to the first showing, people waited two hours to get into Up in the Air and hundreds were turned away.

The world premiere for Up in the Air occurred at 2009's Toronto International Film Festival (TIFF) which ran from September 10 to 19, 2009. The press showing was on Friday September 11, 2009. Public screenings were on September 12, 13, and 19. Reitman originally did not plan to debut the film at TIFF, since it was not scheduled to be ready for another three months. He rushed production to keep his Toronto debut streak going.

The first clip of the film debuted on Apple Inc. website on September 8, 2009. The first trailer was available on iTunes on September 10, 2009, and on September 18, 2009, it screened before the new movies The Informant! and Love Happens. The second trailer became available on October 1, 2009.

==== October 2009 ====
Reitman received Aspen Film's first New Directions Award and participated in a question and answer session following a screening of Up in the Air on Friday October 2, 2009 at the Wheeler Opera House. The Aspen Film Festival ran from September 30, 2009, through October 4, 2009. It was shown twice at the Tinker Street Cinema on the closing day of the Tenth Annual Woodstock Film Festival 2009 on October 4, 2009. Vera Farmiga and Lucy Liu participated in a question and answer session moderated by entertainment journalist Martha Frankel after the film and in the Sunday noontime WFF Actor's Dialogue panel. The 2009 Hamptons International Film Festival showed Up in the Air on October 10, 2009, during its run at Long Island, New York's east end from October 8 to October 12, 2009.

The Spotlight Tribute held during the 32nd edition of Mill Valley Film Festival hosted an interview with Reitman and a screening of Up in the Air on Wednesday October 14, 2009 in the Smith Rafael Film Center, San Rafael, California. The Mill Valley Film Festival ran from October 8 to October 18, 2009. It was also shown four times at the 53rd London Film Festival which was held from October 14–19, 2009. Up in the Air was the only American film to compete for the Golden Marc'Aurelio Audience Award for Best Film at the fourth annual International Rome Film Festival which ran from October 15 through October 23, 2009. It was shown three times from October 17 to October 19, 2009. Reitman showed Up in the Air at ShowEast in Orlando, Florida on October 26 and October 27, 2009, and asked for the movie theater owners and managers to support the picture as fervently as they did his film Juno two years earlier. Reitman also held a Q&A and pep talk with film students at the University of Central Florida.

The first St. Louis press screening happened on October 28, 2009, at the Tivoli Theater. Up in the Air closed the Austin Film Festival on October 29, 2009, at the Paramount. Reitman attended the screening. The Austin Film Festival ran from October 22 to October 29, 2009. The Palm Springs International Film Society showed Up in the Air on Thursday, October 29, 2009, at the Regal Cinema in Palm Springs, California. Anna Kendrick was present at the showing.

==== November 2009 ====
Vera Farmiga and Anna Kendrick hosted a screening of Up in the Air at the Paris Theatre, New York City, New York on Thursday November 5, 2009. On November 6, 2009, the New York City Apple Store in SoHo hosted a conversation with director Jason Reitman. On November 6, 2009 The New York Times critic Janet Maslin interviewed Reitman and Kirn during a Q&A session held at the Jacob Burns Film Center after a screening of Up in the Air. The question and answer session was followed by a reception in the Jane Peck Gallery. The Boston Sunday Night Film Club had a free screening on Sunday November 8, 2009, with a Q&A session with Reitman following the screening.

Up in the Air was the centerpiece for the 18th Annual St. Louis International Film Festival, which was held from November 12 to November 22, 2009. The film was shown November 14, 2009 at the Tivoli Theater in University City, Missouri with Jason Reitman and Michael Beugg in attendance. Kevin Renick, the St. Louis musician who wrote the song Up in the Air, performed half an hour prior to the screening. Yukon Jake, who performed in the wedding scene in Up in the Air, provided entertainment during the party prior to the screening. The party took place at the St. Louis Ballpark Hilton and the Airport Hilton. Both are featured in the film.

On November 14, 2009, Paramount flew 50 members of the press to New York with Anna Kendrick, Sad Brad Smith and representatives of American Airlines to promote Up in the Air. The film was shown on the aircraft's video monitors during the flight from New York to Los Angeles. American Airlines provided the Boeing 767 gratis. Smith performed a few songs including Help Yourself in the aisle of the aircraft. On November 18, 2009, Backstage and Paramount Pictures had a special screening of Up in the Air for Screen Actors Guild and Backstage members at The Paramount Theatre (on the Paramount Lot), Los Angeles, California. The screening of the film was followed by a conversation with cast members Vera Farmiga and Anna Kendrick. The Starz Denver Film Festival closed on November 22, 2009, with a screening of Up in the Air, with an introduction by J.K. Simmons, who was in town to accept the festival's Cassavetes Award earlier that afternoon. The 20th Stockholm International Film Festival, which ran from November 18 to November 29, 2009, closed with a screening of Up in the Air on November 29, 2009.

=== Home media ===
Up in the Air was released on Blu-ray and DVD by Paramount Home Entertainment on March 9, 2010, and sold 536,441 units in its first week of release, worth $9,114,133 of consumer spending. To date the film has sold 1,162,509 physical home video copies, equivalent to $18,517,122 of sales.

== Reception ==
=== Box office ===
Up in the Air was released in 15 theaters in the United States on December 4, 2009, and ranked number 13 with $1.2 million, an average of $78,763 per theater. After three days it expanded to 72 theaters and made $2.4 million ($33,255 per theater) during the second weekend. In its third weekend, it broke into the top 10 as it widened to 175 theaters and came in at number 8 with $3.2 million. The film expanded to 1,895 theaters on December 23. It completed its domestic run on April 8, 2010, with a total domestic gross of $83.8 million and a foreign total of $83 million for a worldwide gross of $166.8 million.

=== Critical response ===
Up in the Air received widespread critical acclaim, with Clooney's and Kendrick's performances receiving praise, as well as the screenplay and editing. Review aggregator Rotten Tomatoes gave the film an approval rating of 90% based on 288 reviews, with a rating average of 8.1/10. The site's critical consensus reads, "Led by charismatic performances by its three leads, director Jason Reitman delivers a smart blend of humor and emotion with just enough edge for mainstream audiences." On Metacritic, the film has a rating score of 83 out of 100, based on 36 critics, indicating "universal acclaim". Audiences polled by CinemaScore gave the film an average grade of "B" on an A+ to F scale.

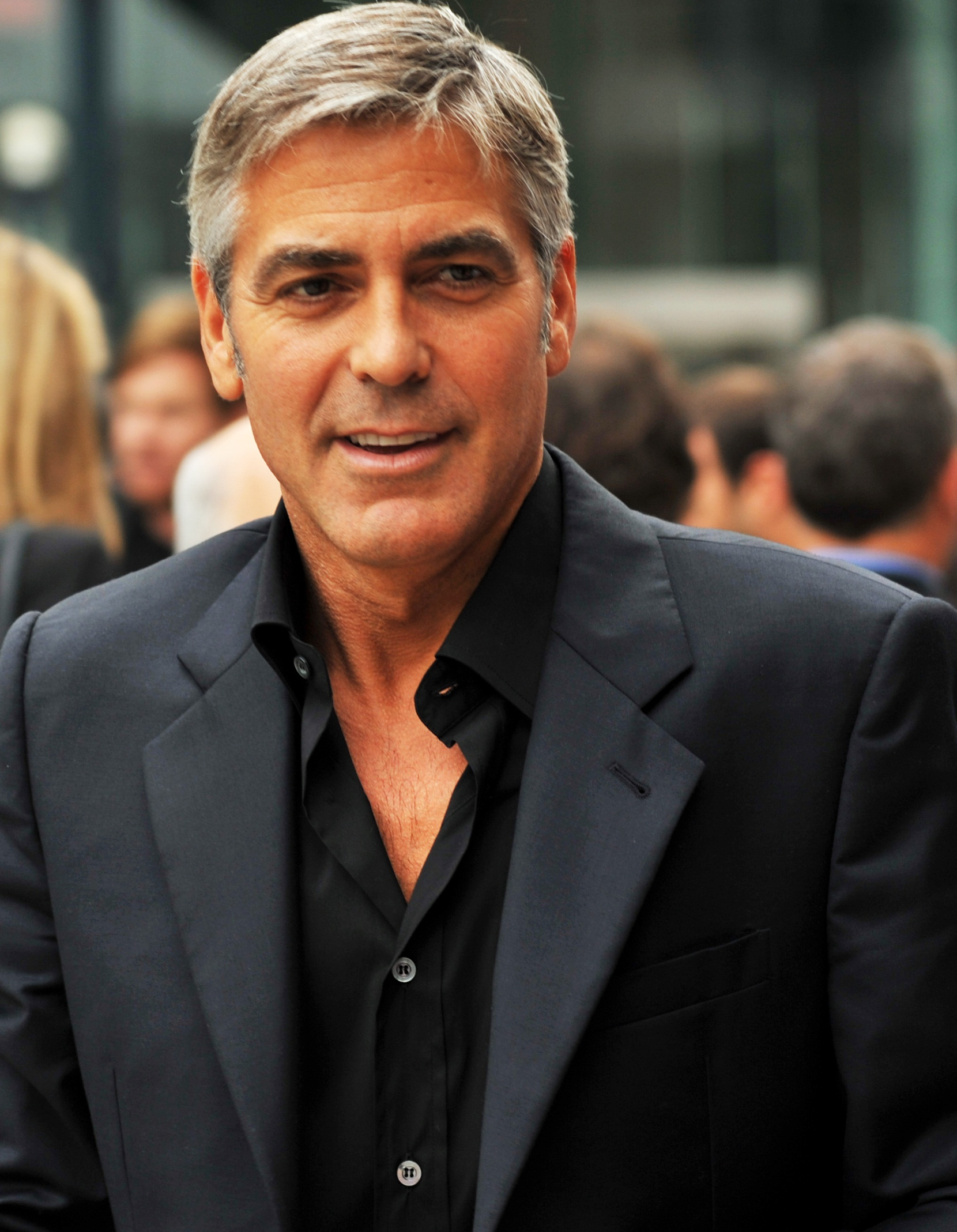
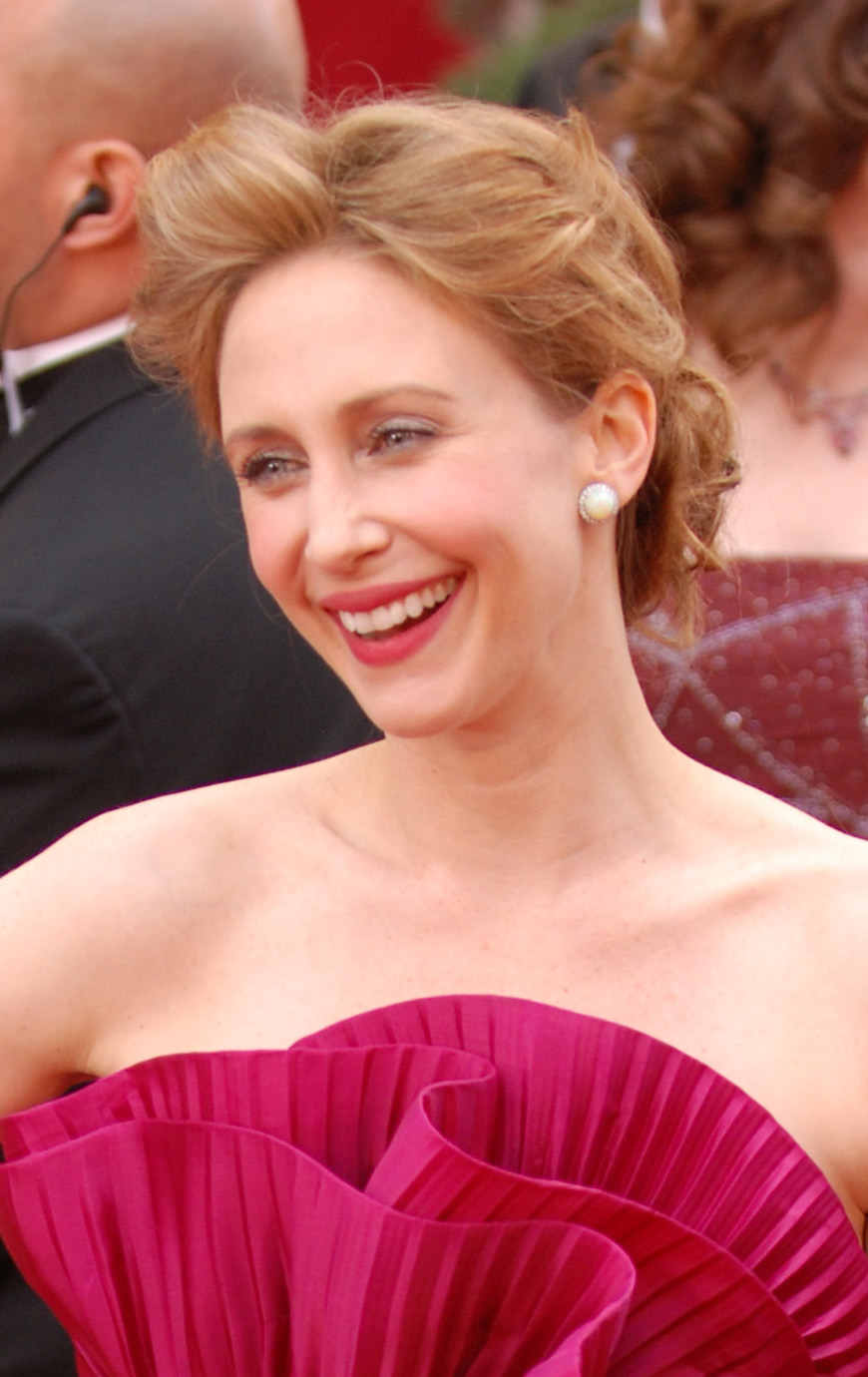
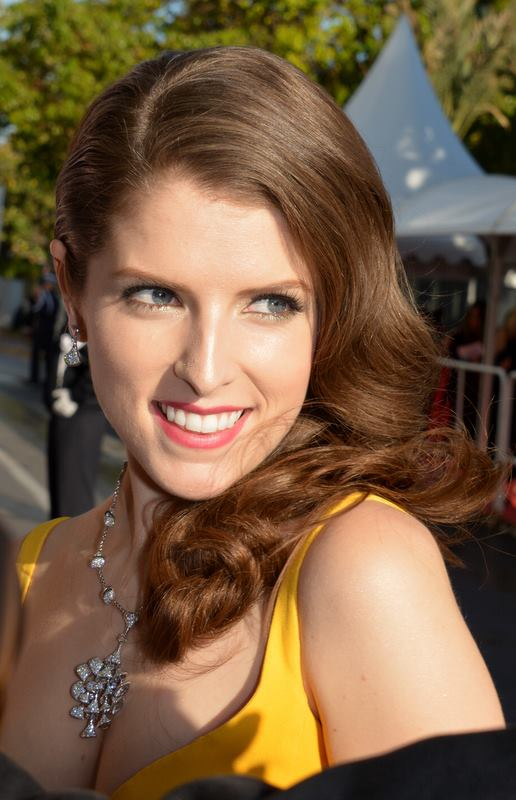
The performances of George Clooney, Vera Farmiga and Anna Kendrick garnered widespread critical acclaim, earning them all Academy Award nominations, with the first being nominated for Best Actor and the latter two being nominated for Best Supporting Actress.

The sneak preview of Up in the Air was the highest profile hit during the Telluride Film Festival. The film also tied for third place in the Toronto International Film Festival Indiewire poll.

Kenneth Turan of the Los Angeles Times wrote, "Up in the Air makes it look easy. Not just in its casual and apparently effortless excellence, but in its ability to blend entertainment and insight, comedy and poignancy, even drama and reality, things that are difficult by themselves but a whole lot harder in combination. This film does all that and never seems to break a sweat." Entertainment Weekly's Owen Gleiberman agreed, rating the film an A as a "rare and sparkling gem of a movie, directed by Jason Reitman with the polish of a master."

Claudia Puig of USA Today praised the film's sense of timeliness, writing, "It's tough to capture an era while it's still happening, yet Up in the Air does so brilliantly, with wit and humanity ... Reitman emerges as a modern-day Frank Capra, capturing the nation's anxieties and culture of resilience." Stephen Saito of IFC.com wrote, "It touches on larger themes of mass unemployment, cultural alienation and technology as a crutch. But ultimately, it's really an expertly done character study that's a dramatic change of pace from director Jason Reitman's previous two films." Jonathan Romney of The Independent wrote, "Its cynical wit almost places it in the Billy Wilder bracket: Up In The Air is as eloquent about today's executive culture as The Apartment was about that of 1960. It is a brutal, desolate film – but also a superb existential rom-com, and the most entertaining lesson in contemporary socio-economics that you could hope for." Roger Ebert gave the film four stars and wrote, "This isn't a comedy. If it were, it would be hard to laugh in these last days of 2009. Nor is it a tragedy. It's an observant look at how a man does a job."

Calling the film "a slickly engaging piece of lightweight existentialism," Todd McCarthy wrote in Variety that "Clooney owns his role in the way first-rate film stars can, so infusing the character with his own persona that everything he does seems natural and right. The timing in the Clooney-Farmiga scenes is like splendid tennis." The New York Times' Manohla Dargis especially appreciated the film's strong female roles, noting that "the ferocious Ms. Kendrick, her ponytail swinging like an ax, grabs every scene she's in," but wrote that the film "is an assertively, and unapologetically, tidy package, from its use of romance to instill some drama ... and the mope rock tunes that Mr. Reitman needlessly overuses."

The Chicago Tribune's Michael Phillips wrote, "Up in the Air is a slickly crafted disappointment. [It] feels tailor-made for George Clooney, who is very good. But the stakes remain frustratingly low and it's one of those contemporary middlebrow projects that asks us to root for a genial, shallow individual as he learns to be a little less the man he was." Julian Sancton of Vanity Fair wrote, "There are two movies in Up in the Air: one about a guy who's flying around the country firing people, and one about a commitment-phobe who's flying away from responsibility and a shot at true love, as embodied by Farmiga. There is no attempt to braid these two threads together, and that's where the movie feels unsatisfying." J. Hoberman of The Village Voice wrote, "Like Juno, Up in the Air conjures a troubling reality and then wishes it away. The filmmakers have peeked into the abyss and averted their eyes ... [the film] warns that you can't go home again – and then, full of false cheer and false consciousness, pretends you can."

Shave Magazine's Jake Tomlinson gave the film four out of five stars and wrote, "There is a very strong sense of humor as well as emotional depth, yet the scope of the film sometimes limits these sentiments. As a moviegoer, this film provides a satisfying experience where one can take a step back to ponder some of the finer points in our daily lives, but don't expect to find all the answers here."

=== Accolades ===
Up in the Air earned various awards and nominations, in categories ranging from recognition of the film itself to its screenplay, direction and editing, to the performance of the three primary actors – George Clooney, Vera Farmiga, and Anna Kendrick. The film received six Academy Award nominations and Farmiga and Kendrick both received nominations for Best Supporting Actress, although the two may have "split the vote" as the film failed to win any of the awards. At the 63rd British Academy Film Awards, Up in the Air won one award – Best Adapted Screenplay, awarded to Reitman and Turner – out of the five for which it was nominated. The Dallas-Fort Worth Film Critics Association named Up in the Air Best Picture and awarded Reitman Best Director and Best Screenplay with Turner, and Clooney was given the award for Best Actor. The film also received five nominations at the 67th Golden Globe Awards, with Reitman and Turner taking the award for Best Screenplay. Reitman and Turner also received recognition for the film's screenplay from the Writers Guild of America, where they won the Best Adapted Screenplay award.

The film garnered five nominations from the Satellite Awards, with Rolfe Kent, the film's score composer, winning the Best Original Score award. Clooney, Farmiga and Kendrick were each nominated for an award at the 16th Screen Actors Guild Awards, but ultimately lost out. Kendrick earned an MTV Movie Award for Best Breakthrough Performance and the Rising Star Award from Palm Springs International Film Festival for her role in the film. Up in the Air won Best Film from eleven awards ceremonies, including the Florida Film Critics Circle, Iowa Film Critics, Southeastern Film Critics, and Vancouver Film Critics Circle. The film earned four nominations for the Best Cast from the Broadcast Film Critics Association, Central Ohio Film Critics, Denver Film Critics Society, and the Washington D.C. Area Film Critics Association. At the Kansas City Film Critics Circle and the National Board of Review, Up in the Air won each of the awards for which it was nominated. Costume Designer Danny Glicker was nominated for his work by the Costume Designers Guild in the Contemporary Film category. In addition, the film was included on lists of the ten best films of 2009 by Roger Ebert, the American Film Institute, and The New York Times.
