= List of 2013 deaths in popular music =

This is a list of notable performers of rock music and other forms of popular music, and others directly associated with the music as producers, songwriters, or in other closely related roles, who died in 2013.

== 2013 deaths in popular music ==
| Preceded by 2012 | List of deaths in popular music 2013 | Succeeded by 2014 |

| Name | Age | Date | Location | Cause of death |
|---|---|---|---|---|
| Patti Page | 85 | January 1, 2013 | Encinitas, California, U.S. | Heart and lung disease |
| Sammy Johns | 66 | January 4, 2013 | Gastonia, North Carolina, U.S. | |
| Trevor Gordon; The Marbles | 64 | January 10, 2013 | London, England | Natural causes |
| Precious Bryant | 71 | January 12, 2013 | Columbus, Georgia, U.S. | Complications from diabetes and congestive heart failure |
| Nic Potter; Van der Graaf Generator | 61 | January 16, 2013 | London, England, U.K. | Pneumonia |
| Chicago Bob Nelson | 68 | January 17, 2013 | Chicago, Illinois, U.S. | |
| Bobby Bennett; The Famous Flames, Bobby Bennett & The Dynamics | 74 | January 18, 2013 | Maryland, U.S. | Complications from diabetes |
| Steve Knight; Mountain, The Devil's Anvil | 77 | January 19, 2013 | Riverdale, New York, U.S. | Parkinson's disease |
| Bob Engemann; The Lettermen | 77 | January 20, 2013 | Provo, Utah, U.S. | Complications from a heart surgery |
| Leroy "Sugarfoot" Bonner; Ohio Players | 69 | January 26, 2013 | Trotwood, Ohio, U.S. | Cancer |
| Gianni Mocchetti Italian singer-songwriter , guitarist and bassist | 65 | January 28, 2013 | Como, Italy | Long illness |
| Mickey Finn; Heavy Metal Kids | 65 | February 1, 2013 | Paris, France | Cancer |
| Mario Zelinotti Italian singer | 70 | February 1, 2013 | Rocca di Papa, Rome, Italy | |
| Donald Byrd | 80 | February 4, 2013 | Dover, Delaware, U.S. | Natural causes |
| Reg Presley; The Troggs | 71 | February 4, 2013 | Andover, Hampshire, England | Lung cancer |
| Mo-Do; ZYX Music, Dancing Ferret | 46 | February 6, 2013 | Udine, Italy | Suicide |
| Shadow Morton | 71 | February 14, 2013 | Laguna Beach, California | Cancer |
| Tim Dog | 46 | February 14, 2013 | Atlanta, Georgia | Complications from diabetes |
| Tony Sheridan | 72 | February 16, 2013 | Hamburg, Germany | After heart surgery |
| Mindy McCready | 37 | February 17, 2013 | Heber Springs, Arkansas, U.S. | Suicide by gunshot |
| Damon Harris; The Temptations | 62 | February 18, 2013 | Baltimore, Maryland, U.S. | Prostate cancer |
| Kevin Ayers; Soft Machine | 68 | February 18, 2013 | Montolieu, France | |
| Magic Slim | 75 | February 21, 2013 | Philadelphia, Pennsylvania, U.S. | |
| Dan Toler; Great Southern, The Allman Brothers Band | 64 | February 25, 2013 | Manatee County, Florida, U.S. | Amyotrophic lateral sclerosis |
| Richard Street; The Temptations | 70 | February 27, 2013 | Las Vegas, Nevada, U.S. | Pulmonary embolism |
| Daniel Darc; Taxi Girl | 53 | February 28, 2013 | Paris, France | Accidental drug overdose |
| Jewel Akens; Record producer for Era Records | 79 | March 1, 2013 | Inglewood, California, U.S. | Complications following back surgery |
| Jim Murray; Quicksilver Messenger Service | 70 | March 1, 2013 | Makawao on the island of Maui, Hawaii | Undisclosed causes |
| Bobby Rogers; The Miracles | 73 | March 3, 2013 | Southfield, Michigan, U.S. | Complications from diabetes |
| Alvin Lee; Ten Years After | 68 | March 6, 2013 | Marbella, Spain | |
| Stompin' Tom Connors | 77 | March 6, 2013 | Ballinafad, Ontario, Canada | Kidney failure |
| Chorão; Charlie Brown Jr. | 42 | March 6, 2013 | São Paulo, Brazil | Cocaine overdose |
| Peter Banks; Yes | 65 | March 7, 2013 | London, England | Heart failure |
| Sammy Masters | 82 | March 8, 2013 | Orange, California, U.S. | |
| Ricardo da Force; The KLF, N-Trance | 45 | March 8, 2013 | Barbados, Caribbean | Unknown |
| Clive Burr; Iron Maiden | 56 | March 12, 2013 | London, England | Multiple sclerosis |
| Hardrock Gunter | 88 | March 15, 2013 | Rio Rancho, Sandoval, New Mexico, U.S. | Complications of pneumonia |
| Jason Molina | 39 | March 16, 2013 | Indianapolis, Indiana, U.S. | Alcohol abuse-related organ failure |
| Bobby Smith; The Spinners | 76 | March 16, 2013 | Orlando, Florida, U.S. | Complications of influenza and pneumonia |
| Bebo Valdés | 94 | March 24, 2013 | Stockholm, Sweden | |
| Reinhard Lakomy | 67 | March 23, 2013 | Berlin, Germany | Lung cancer |
| Deke Richards; Motown record producer | 68 | March 24, 2013 | Bellingham, Washington, U.S. | Esophageal cancer |
| Phil Ramone; Record engineer and record producer | 79 | March 26, 2013 | New York City, New York, U.S. | Aortic aneurysm |
| Dale Hyatt | 87 | March 28, 2013 | Hawkins, Texas, United States | |
| Hugh McCracken | 70 | March 28, 2013 | New York City, New York, U.S. | Leukemia |
| Enzo Jannacci Italian singer-songwriter and cabaret artist | 77 | March 29, 2013 | Milan, Italy | |
| Franco Califano Italian singer-songwriter and record producer | 74 | March 30, 2013 | Rome, Italy | |
| Chris Bailey; The Angels, GANGgajang | 62 | April 4, 2013 | Sydney, Australia | Throat cancer |
| Andy Johns; Sound engineer and record producer | 62 | April 7, 2013 | Los Angeles, California, U.S. | Stomach ulcer |
| Emilio Pericoli | 85 | April 9, 2013 | Savignano sul Rubicone, Forlì-Cesena, Italy | |
| Jimmy Dawkins | 76 | April 10, 2013 | Chicago, Illinois, U.S. | |
| Don Blackman; Twennynine, Parliament, Funkadelic, Earth, Wind & Fire | 59 | April 11, 2013 | New York City, U.S. | Cancer |
| Sue Draheim | 63 | April 11, 2013 | Berea, Kentucky, U.S. | Cancer |
| Chi Cheng; Deftones | 42 | April 13, 2013 | Sacramento, California, U.S. | Cardiac arrest |
| Vincent Montana Jr. MFSB | 85 | April 13, 2013 | Cherry Hill, New Jersey, U.S. | |
| George Jackson | 68 | April 14, 2013 | Ridgeland, Mississippi, U.S. | Cancer |
| Scott Miller; Alternate Learning, Game Theory, The Loud Family | 53 | April 15, 2013 | U.S. | Suicide |
| Cordell Mosson; Parliament-Funkadelic | 60 | April 18, 2013 | New Brunswick, New Jersey, U.S. | Liver failure |
| Storm Thorgerson | 69 | April 18, 2013 | London, England, U.K. | Cancer |
| Artie "Blues Boy" White | 76 | April 20, 2013 | Harvey, Illinois, U.S. | Parkinson's disease |
| Chrissy Amphlett; Divinyls | 53 | April 21, 2013 | New York City, New York, U.S. | Breast cancer |
| Dani Crivelli; Krokus, Killer | 53 | April 21, 2013 | Trimbach, Solothurn, Switzerland | Accident - fall from bridge |
| Richie Havens | 72 | April 22, 2013 | Jersey City, New Jersey, U.S. | Heart attack |
| Bob Brozman | 59 | April 23, 2013 | Ben Lomond, California, U.S. | Suicide |
| George Jones | 81 | April 26, 2013 | Nashville, Tennessee, U.S. | Hypoxic respiratory failure |
| Chris Kelly; Kriss Kross | 34 | May 1, 2013 | Atlanta, Georgia, U.S. | Drug overdose |
| Jeff Hanneman; Slayer | 49 | May 2, 2013 | Los Angeles, California, U.S. | Liver failure |
| Ken Whaley; Man, Help Yourself, Ducks Deluxe | 66 | May 8, 2013 | London, England | Lung cancer |
| Alan O'Day | 72 | May 17, 2013 | Westwood, California, U.S. | Brain cancer |
| Ray Manzarek; The Doors | 74 | May 20, 2013 | Rosenheim, Germany | Bile duct cancer |
| Trevor Bolder; Uriah Heep | 62 | May 21, 2013 | Cottingham, East Riding of Yorkshire, England | Pancreatic cancer |
| Tyrone Brunson | 57 | May 25, 2013 | Washington, D.C., U.S. | |
| Marshall Lytle; Bill Haley & His Comets | 79 | May 25, 2013 | New Port Richey, Florida, U.S. | Lung cancer |
| Little Tony | 72 | May 27, 2013 | Rome, Italy | |
| Zach Sobiech | 18 | May 30, 2013 | Lakeland, Saint Paul, Minnesota, U.S. | Complications from osteosarcoma |
| Rob Morsberger | 53 | June 2, 2013 | Hudson Valley, U.S. | Cancer |
| MickDeth; Eighteen Visions; Bleeding Through | 35 | June 3, 2013 | Salt Lake City, Utah, U.S. | Heart condition |
| Marcin Szyszko Wilki | 43 | June 4, 2013 | Poland | Complications from drug addiction |
| Joey Covington; Hot Tuna, Jefferson Airplane | 67 | June 4, 2013 | Palm Springs, California, U.S. | Traffic accident |
| Darondo | 66 | June 9, 2013 | Sacramento, California, U.S. | Heart failure |
| Slim Whitman | 90 | June 19, 2013 | Orange Park, Florida, U.S. | Heart failure |
| Filip Topol; Psí vojáci | 48 | June 19, 2013 | Prague, Czechia | |
| Paul Smith | 91 | June 20, 2013 | Torrance, California, U.S. | Heart failure |
| Mary Love | 69 | June 21, 2013 | Sacramento, California, United States | |
| Bobby Bland | 83 | June 23, 2013 | Germantown, Tennessee, U.S. | |
| Little Willie Littlefield | 81 | June 23, 2013 | Voorthuizen, Netherlands | Cancer |
| Alan Myers; Devo | 58 | June 24, 2013 | Los Angeles, California, U.S. | Stomach cancer |
| Texas Johnny Brown | 85 | July 1, 2013 | Houston, Texas, U.S. | Lung cancer |
| Brett Walker | 51 | July 9, 2013 | Draper, Utah, U.S. | |
| Cory Monteith; Known from Glee | 31 | July 13, 2013 | Vancouver, British Columbia, Canada | Drug overdose |
| Marisa Colomber Italian singer and actress | 84 | July 14, 2013 | Galliera, Genoa, Italy | |
| T-Model Ford | 90 | July 16, 2013 | Greenville, Mississippi, U.S. | Respiratory failure |
| MC Daleste; Brazilian rapper | 20 | July 7, 2013 | Paulínia, São Paulo, Brazil | Shot while performing onstage |
| Mikhail Gorsheniov; Korol i Shut | 39 | July 19, 2013 | Saint Petersburg, Russian Federation | Heart failure due to alcoholic cardiomyopathy |
| Puff Johnson | 40 | July 24, 2013 | U.S. | Cervical cancer |
| Mike Shipley; Record producer and music engineer | 56 | July 25, 2013 | Studio City, Los Angeles, U.S. | Suicide |
| JJ Cale | 74 | July 26, 2013 | La Jolla, California, U.S. | Heart attack |
| Mick Farren; The Deviants, Pink Fairies | 69 | July 27, 2013 | London, England | Heart attack while performing on stage |
| Rita Reys | 88 | July 28, 2013 | Breukelen, Netherlands | Brain hemorrhage |
| Tim Wright; Pere Ubu | 63 | August 4, 2013 | Claveland, Ohio, U.S. | Cancer |
| George Duke | 67 | August 5, 2013 | Los Angeles, California, U.S. | Leukemia |
| Jack Clement | 82 | August 8, 2013 | Nashville, Tennessee, U.S. | Liver cancer |
| Al Coury | 78 | August 8, 2013 | Thousand Oaks, California, U.S. | |
| Allen Lanier; Blue Öyster Cult | 67 | August 14, 2013 | New York City, New York, U.S. | Chronic obstructive pulmonary disease |
| Cedar Walton | 79 | August 19, 2013 | Brooklyn, New York City, U.S. | |
| Keiko Fuji | 62 | August 22, 2013 | Shinjuku, Tokyo, Japan | Suicide |
| Forrest | 60 | September 6, 2013 | Tilburg, Netherlands | Stroke |
| Champignon; Charlie Brown Jr., Revolucionnários, Nove Mil Anjos, A Banca | 35 | September 9, 2013 | São Paulo, Brazil | Suicide |
| Jimmy Fontana Italian singer and composer | 78 | September 11, 2013 | Rome, Italy | |
| Patti Webster | 49 | September 13, 2013 | Somerville, New Jersey, U.S. | Cancer |
| Jackie Lomax | 69 | September 15, 2013 | Wirral, England, U.K. | |
| Bobby Mansfield; The Wrens | 76 | September 15, 2013 | The Bronx, New York, U.S. | Unknown |
| Mac Curtis | 74 | September 16, 2013 | Weatherford, Texas, U.S. | Complications from car accident |
| Jimmy Ponder | 67 | September 16, 2013 | Pittsburgh, Pennsylvania, U.S. | Lung cancer |
| Lindsay Cooper; Henry Cow, Comus, National Health | 62 | September 18, 2013 | London, England, U.K. | Multiple sclerosis |
| Johnny Laboriel; Los Rebeldes del Rock | 71 | September 18, 2013 | Mexico City, Distrito Federal, Mexico | Prostate cancer |
| Billy Mure | 97 | September 25, 2013 | Vero Beach, Florida, U.S. | |
| Butch Warren | 74 | October 5, 2013 | Silver Spring, Maryland, U.S. | Lung cancer |
| Philip Chevron; The Pogues, The Radiators from Space | 56 | October 8, 2013 | Dublin, Ireland | Esophageal cancer |
| Jan Kuehnemund; Vixen | 51 | October 10, 2013 | Colorado Springs, Colorado, U.S. | Cancer |
| Amy Ross; Nowhere Man and a Whiskey Girl | 39 | October 13, 2013 | Ireland | Infection prior to surgery |
| Derrick Ross; Nowhere Man and a Whiskey Girl | 39 | October 13, 2013 | Ireland | Suicide |
| Gloria Lynne | 83 | October 15, 2013 | Newark, New Jersey, U.S. | Heart attack |
| Ronald Shannon Jackson; Last Exit | 73 | October 19, 2013 | Fort Worth, Texas, U.S. | Leukemia |
| Gianni Ferrio; Italian conductor and arranger | 88 | October 21, 2013 | Rome, Italy | Natural causes related to advanced age |
| Gypie Mayo; Dr. Feelgood, The Yardbirds | 62 | October 23, 2013 | Bath, Somerset, England | |
| Al Johnson; The Unifics | 65 | October 26, 2013 | Cheverly, Maryland, United States | |
| Lou Reed; Velvet Underground | 71 | October 27, 2013 | Long Island, New York, U.S. | Liver disease |
| Pete Haycock; Climax Blues Band | 62 | October 30, 2013 | Frankfurt, Germnany | Heart attack |
| Frank Wess | 91 | October 30, 2013 | New York, U.S. | |
| Bobby Parker | 76 | October 31, 2013 | Bowie, Maryland, U.S. | Heart attack |
| Nate Morgan; Rufus | 60 | November 21, 2013 | Gardena, California, U.S. | Heart failure |
| Corrado Castellari; Italian singer-songwriter, composer and guitarist | 68 | November 23, 2013 | Mornico Losana, Italy | (Whoever wrote this forgot to put the cause of death in, because they don't check their work) |
| Chico Hamilton | 92 | November 25, 2013 | Manhattan, New York, U.S. | |
| Oliver Cheatham | 65 | November 29, 2013 | Detroit, Michigan, U.S. | Heart attack |
| Dick Dodd; The Standells | 68 | November 29, 2013 | Fountain Valley, California, U.S. | Cancer |
| Richard Coughlan; Caravan | 66 | December 1, 2013 | Herne Bay, Kent, England | Pneumonia |
| Junior Murvin | 67 | December 2, 2013 | Port Antonio, Jamaica | Diabetes |
| Andy Pierce Nasty Idols, Machinegun Kelly | 45 | December 5, 2013 | Malmö, Sweden | Cerebral haemorrhage |
| Gail Collins Pappalardi | 72 | December 6, 2013 | Ajijic Jalisco, Mexico | Cancer |
| Stan Tracey | 86 | December 6, 2013 | Tupelo, Mississippi, U.S. | Cancer |
| Jim Hall | 83 | December 10, 2013 | Manhattan, New York City, New York, U.S. | Heart failure |
| Ray Price | 87 | December 16, 2013 | Mount Pleasant, Texas, U.S. | Cancer |
| Herb Geller | 85 | December 19, 2013 | Hamburg, Germany | Pneumonia |
| David Richards; Record producer for Queen | 57 | December 20, 2013 | Attalens, Switzerland | Heart disease |
| Yusef Lateef | 93 | December 23, 2013 | Shutesbury, Massachusetts, U.S. | Prostate cancer |
| Ricky Lawson | 59 | December 23, 2013 | Long Beach, California, U.S. | Brain aneurysm |
| Benjamin Curtis; Tripping Daisy, Secret Machines, School of Seven Bells, UFOFU | 35 | December 29, 2013 | New York City, New York, U.S. | T-cell lymphoblastic lymphoma |
| Roberto Ciotti Italian guitarist and singer | 60 | December 31, 2013 | Rome, Italy | |

== See also ==
- List of murdered hip hop musicians
- 27 Club
