= The Moth, the Lizard, and the Secret Machines =

Studio album by Secret Machines
- Released: March 24, 2023
- Genre: Indie rock
- Length: 49:02
- Language: English
- Label: TSM Recordings
- Producer: Secret Machines

Secret Machines chronology
| Day 21 and Dreaming of Dreaming (2022) | The Moth, the Lizard, and the Secret Machines (2023) |

The Moth, the Lizard, and the Secret Machines is the fifth full-length studio album by American indie rock band Secret Machines, released by TSM Recordings on February 17, 2023. It is the second release after the death of former guitarist Benjamin Curtis and includes recordings finalized from his lifetime.

== Reception ==
Editors at AllMusic rated this album 3.5 out of 5 stars, with critic Matt Collar writing that this album "is neither a stadium-sized epic like their debut LP, nor as melodically hooky or emotionally resonant as Awake, it still has its own intriguing, dreamlike qualities".

== Track listing ==
All songs written by Brandon Curtis, Josh Garza, and Philip Karnats

1. "There's No Starting Over" – 4:41
2. "I Think It's Light Outside" – 4:31
3. "You Want It Worse" – 4:34
4. "Even Out the Overflow" – 5:44
5. "Last One Out" – 4:57
6. "The Answer" – 4:30
7. "Crucifixion Time" – 7:25
8. "Run Out the Silver Light" – 6:53
9. "The Finalizer" – 5:48

== Personnel ==
Secret Machines

- Brandon Curtis – instrumentation, recording, production
- Josh Garza – instrumentation, recording, production
- Philip Karnats – instrumentation, recording, production

Additional personnel

- Vanessa Prager – cover painting
- Simon Scott – mastering
- Jeff Vespa – photography

== See also ==
- List of 2023 albums
