= Secret Machines (album) =

Studio album by The Secret Machines
- Released: October 14, 2008
- Recorded: 2007–2008
- Genre: Space rock
- Label: TSM Recordings
- Producer: Secret Machines, Brandon Mason

The Secret Machines chronology
| Ten Silver Drops (2006) | Secret Machines (2008) | Live at the Garage (2019) |

Professional ratings
Aggregate scores
| Source | Rating |
|---|---|
| Metacritic | 65/100 |
Review scores
| Source | Rating |
| Allmusic | 2/5 stars |
| ChartAttack | 2/5 |
| The Fly | 3/5 stars |
| JustPressPlay | 6.0/10 |
| Pitchfork Media | 7.2/10 |
| Spectrum Culture | 2.0/5 |
| SPON | 6/10 |

Secret Machines is the third album by the alternative group The Secret Machines. The band self-released the follow-up to 2006's Ten Silver Drops in the US on October 14 and it was scheduled for release in Europe in mid-January 2009. The album was recorded in New York City and produced by the band and Brandon Mason. It is their first album with the band's new guitarist Phil Karnats, who replaced Benjamin Curtis after he left the group in March 2007.

== Track listing ==
- All tracks written by Secret Machines.
1. "Atomic Heels" – 3:40
2. "Last Believer, Drop Dead" – 5:32
3. "Have I Run Out" – 7:40
4. "Underneath the Concrete" – 3:51
5. "Now You're Gone" – 5:22
6. "The Walls Are Starting to Crack" – 6:37
7. "I Never Thought to Ask" – 4:06
8. "The Fire Is Waiting" – 11:09

UK bonus tracks

9. "Daylight, Won't Be Long"
10. "Dreaming of Dreaming"

== Personnel ==
- Brandon Curtis – vocals, bass guitar, keyboards
- Josh Garza – drums
- Phil Karnats – guitar
