= Ten Silver Drops =

Studio album by The Secret Machines
- Released: April 25, 2006
- Recorded: 2005
- Genre: New prog, space rock
- Length: 45:50
- Label: Reprise
- Producer: Secret Machines

The Secret Machines chronology
The Road Leads Where It's Led (2005)	Ten Silver Drops (2006)	Secret Machines (2008)

Singles from Ten Silver Drops
- 1. "Alone, Jealous and Stoned" Released: January 16, 2006; 2. "Lightning Blue Eyes" Released: March 27, 2006; 3. "All at Once (It's Not Important)" Released: August 21, 2006

Professional ratings
Aggregate scores
Source	Rating
Metacritic	75/100 link
Review scores
Source	Rating
AllMusic	link
Entertainment Weekly	A-
Pitchfork	6.3/10
Q	4/5 stars
Rolling Stone	3.5/5 stars

Ten Silver Drops is the second full-length album by the American rock band The Secret Machines. It was released exclusively through the iTunes Music Store on February 28, 2006, while the street date for the CD was April 25, 2006. The first single from the album, "Alone, Jealous and Stoned", was released in the United Kingdom on January 16, 2006, and in the US shortly thereafter. On January 29, 2006, Ten Silver Drops leaked onto file sharing websites following the release of the album's lead single in the UK.

The album reached No. 43 on the UK Albums Chart. In the US, the album reached No. 159 on the Billboard 200.

== Track listing ==
- All tracks written by Secret Machines.
1. "Alone, Jealous and Stoned" – 6:46
2. "All at Once (It's Not Important)" – 4:37
3. "Lightning Blue Eyes" – 5:31
4. "Daddy's in the Doldrums" – 8:23
5. "I Hate Pretending" – 5:15
6. "Faded Lines" – 4:59
7. "I Want to Know if It's Still Possible" – 5:00
8. "1,000 Seconds" – 5:15

== Personnel ==
- Brandon Curtis – vocals, bass guitar, keyboards
- Benjamin Curtis – guitar, backing vocals
- Josh Garza – drums

with:

- Alejandra Deheza – vocals on "Faded Lines"
- Garth Hudson – accordion on "I Want to Know if It's Still Possible"

== Run Out Groove Vinyl Reissue ==
On September 10, 2018, the label announced that the band's album Ten Silver Drops had been voted by fans as the next ROG re-release and would include a 6-song bonus disc containing B-sides and unreleased alternate versions of songs.

Expanded edition Bonus Tracks:

1. Daddy's in the Doldrums (previously unreleased alternate version) 8:00
2. Another Minute Standing Still (non-LP track from “Lightning Blue Eyes” UK single) 5:19
3. Everything is Free (non-LP track from “All At Once (It’s Not Important)” UK single) 4:13
4. Solar Bloodlines (non-LP instrumental track from “Lightning Blue Eyes” UK single) 6:15
5. I Want To Know If It's Still Possible (previously unreleased alternate acoustic version) 4:55
6. Angel in Love With Her Own Wings (non-LP track from “All At Once (It’s Not Important)” UK single ) 9:37
