= September 000 =

EP by The Secret Machines
- Released: March 25, 2002
- Recorded: September 2000
- Studio: Clava
- Genre: Rock
- Label: Ace Fu Records
- Producer: Brian Deck

The Secret Machines chronology
September 000 (2002)	Now Here Is Nowhere (2004)

Professional ratings
Review scores
Source	Rating
AllMusic	4/5 stars
Pitchfork Media	8.4/10

September 000 is the first EP by the American rock band The Secret Machines.

== Critical reception ==
The Quietus wrote that the EP is "a great reminder of just how great long-winded, bong-addled, stoner rock can be in the right hands." Trouser Press, on the other hand, considered it an "excruciating bore."

== Track listing ==
1. "Marconi's Radio" – 7:42
2. "What Used to Be French" – 6:30
3. "Breathe" – 2:43
4. "Still See You" – 2:49
5. "It's a Bad Wind That Don't Blow Somebody Some Good" – 5:56
6. "Marconi's Radio (Again)" – 2:46

== Personnel ==
- Brandon Curtis – vocals, bass guitar, keyboard
- Benjamin Curtis (musician) – guitar, backing vocals
- Josh Garza – drums
- Brian Deck - Marimba, electronics, percussion & distorted organ
- Ben Massarella- Percussion
- Tim Rutili - Slide & Acoustic Guitar
- Gillian Lisee - additional percussion
