= Awake in the Brain Chamber =

Studio album by Secret Machines
- Released: August 21, 2020
- Genre: Indie rock
- Length: 31:23
- Language: English
- Label: TSM Recordings
- Producer: Brandon Curtis

Secret Machines chronology
| Live at the Garage (2019) | Awake in the Brain Chamber (2020) | Day 21 and Dreaming of Dreaming (2022) |

Awake in the Brain Chamber is the fourth full-length studio album by American indie rock band Secret Machines, released by TSM Recordings on August 8, 2020. The album has received positive reviews from critics and is a comeback recording after the band had been dormant for several years and features some posthumous recordings from former frontman Benjamin Curtis.

== Reception ==
Professional ratings
Aggregate scores
| Source | Rating |
|---|---|
| Metacritic | 81 (6 reviews) |
Review scores
| Source | Rating |
| AllMusic | 4.5/5 stars |
| Pitchfork | 6.8/10 |
| Under the Radar | 8/10 |

Awake in the Brain received positive reviews from critics noted at review aggregator Metacritic. It has a weighted average score of 81 out of 100, based on six reviews. Editors at AllMusic rated this album 4.5 out of 5 stars, with critic Matt Collar writing that the band shows many influences beyond the space rock that they had been known for earlier, including "ambient music, psych-pop, and kinetic, '70s-style Krautrock", ending that "it's a fitting aesthetic for a band that has returned to earth after a long journey through their inner emotional cosmos". In Glide Magazine, Shawn Donohue calls this "a comeback album that sounds right at home with their past releases while painting a way forward if the band continues to explore their rock cosmos". Ian Cohen of Pitchfork rated this album a 6.8 out of 10, criticizing the music as "the modest charm of fan service, intended for an audience that’s actively rooting for Secret Machines to succeed". Editors of The Quietus chose this as Album of the Week, with Patrick Clarke writing that it "achieves something transcendent" and sums up his review by calling this "a comeback record that overcomes the fractures and scars of its creation without trying to ignore them, a near-complete revival of the band’s former powers, and a bold delve into epic new territory". In Under the Radar, Dom Gourlay gave this release an 8 out of 10, calling the album "a stylish return for one of the underground’s most cherished acts".

== Track listing ==
All songs written by Brandon Curtis.

1. "3, 4, 5, Let’s Stay Alive" – 3:25
2. "Dreaming Is Alright" – 3:47
3. "Talos’ Corpse" – 3:20
4. "Everything’s Under" – 4:29
5. "Everything Starts" – 5:03
6. "Angel Come" – 3:23
7. "A New Disaster" – 4:23
8. "So Far Down" – 3:34

== Personnel ==
Secret Machines

- Benjamin Curtis – guitar
- Brandon Curtis – guitar, bass guitar, keyboards, percussion, vocals, engineering, production
- Josh Garza – drums

Additional personnel

- Bryan Bisordi – percussion
- Chris Kyle – guitar
- Joe Lambert – mastering
- Claudius Mittendorfer – mixing
- Sarah Pedinotti – keyboards, vocals

== See also ==
- List of 2020 albums
