= Ghostory (album) =

Studio album by School of Seven Bells
- Released: February 28, 2012
- Genres: Indie rock; dream pop; shoegaze; indietronica
- Length: 45:19
- Labels: Vagrant; Ghostly International
- Producer: Benjamin Curtis

School of Seven Bells chronology
Disconnect from Desire (2010)	Ghostory (2012)	SVIIB (2016)

Singles from Ghostory
- 1. "Lafaye" Released: January 17, 2012; 2. "The Night" Released: February 17, 2012; 3. "Scavenger" Released: July 22, 2012

Professional ratings
Aggregate scores
Source	Rating
Metacritic	69/100
Review scores
Source	Rating
AllMusic	4.5/5 stars
Drowned in Sound	9/10
The Guardian	4/5 stars
The Independent	3/5 stars
musicOMH	4/5 stars
NME	4/10
The Observer	4/5 stars
Paste	6.8/10
Pitchfork Media	6.9/10
PopMatters	4/10 stars

Ghostory is the third studio album by American indie rock band School of Seven Bells, released on February 28, 2012, by Vagrant Records and Ghostly International. It is also their first album to be released after the departure of founding member Claudia Deheza, who left the band in October 2010. The track listing details were revealed when the album was made available for streaming through several websites on February 20, 2012.

== Track listing ==
All tracks are written by Alejandra Deheza and Benjamin Curtis.

No.	Title	Length
1.	"The Night"	3:48
2.	"Love Play"	4:11
3.	"Lafaye"	4:14
4.	"Low Times"	6:32
5.	"Reappear"	4:09
6.	"Show Me Love"	4:44
7.	"Scavenger"	4:26
8.	"White Wind"	4:41
9.	"When You Sing"	8:34

iTunes Store bonus tracks
No.	Title	Length
10.	"Unnature"	4:40
11.	"Low Times" (Lafaye's Brain Mix)	8:29

Japanese edition bonus tracks
No.	Title	Length
10.	"Unnature"	4:31
11.	"Low Times" (Lafaye's Brain Mix)	8:30
12.	"The Night" (Rewards Remix)	6:24
13.	"Lafaye" (Creep Remix)	6:01

== Personnel ==
- Alejandra de la Deheza – vocals
- Benjamin Curtis – engineering, guitar, mixing, production
- Divya Anantharaman – headdress
- Steve Choo – assistant engineering
- Christopher Colley – drums (tracks 1, 3, 4, 7–9)
- Bryan Abdul Collins – art direction, design
- Brandon Curtis – additional production, mixing
- Stella Rey – styling
- Geoff Sanoff – drum engineering
- Danny Scales – cover photo
- Daniel Duemer – additional support

== Charts ==
Chart (2012)	Peak position
Scottish Albums (Official Charts)	79
UK Albums (Official Charts)	69
UK Independent Albums (Official Charts)	10
US Top Dance Albums (Billboard)	9
US Independent Albums (Billboard)	32
US Heatseekers Albums (Billboard)	8
US Top Rock Albums (Billboard)	47
