= SVIIB (album) =

Studio album by School of Seven Bells
- Released: February 12, 2016
- Genre: Indie rock; dream pop; shoegaze; electronic
- Length: 41:48
- Label: Vagrant; Full Time Hobby
- Producer: Benjamin Curtis; Justin Meldal-Johnsen

School of Seven Bells chronology
| Ghostory (2012) | SVIIB (2016) |

Professional ratings
Aggregate scores
| Source | Rating |
|---|---|
| Metacritic | 83/100 |
Review scores
| Source | Rating |
| musicOMH | 5/5 stars |
| The Line of Best Fit | 9/10 |
| Drowned in Sound | 9/10 |
| Pitchfork | 8.1/10 |
| No Ripcord | 8/10 |
| The Skinny | 4/5 stars |
| The Guardian | 4/5 stars |
| AllMusic | 4/5 stars |
| PopMatters | 8/10 |
| DIY | 4/5 stars |
| Under the Radar | 8/10 |
| Mixmag | 7/10 |
| Consequence | B− |
| NME | 3/5 stars |
| Spin | 6/10 |

SVIIB is the fourth and final studio album by American indie rock band School of Seven Bells, consisting of Alejandra Deheza (vocals) and Benjamin Curtis (instruments and production). After the 2013 death of Curtis from T-cell lymphoblastic lymphoma, Deheza completed the album using previously recorded material, with assistance from producer Justin Meldal-Johnsen. Most of the material had been recorded from before Curtis's illness, but one track, "Confusion," was recorded while Curtis was in the hospital, with help from Curtis's brother Brandon. The album was released digitally on February 12, 2016, with US and UK releases February 26, 2016 by Vagrant Records and Full Time Hobby, respectively. Deheza described the album as "a love letter from start to finish"; although Deheza and Curtis had ended their relationship in 2010, the two remained close friends and collaborators until Curtis's death.

The album was generally well received, with Pitchfork describing it as "the group's most technically accomplished work, their perfected swan song." Entertainment Weekly ranked it at #19 on their top 50 albums of 2016, calling it the group's "marvelous capstone," and AllMusic named it one of the best indie albums of 2016, calling it "radiantly illustrated with expressions of bliss, frustration, consolation, reassurance, and, ultimately, grief."

== Track listing ==
All tracks are written by Alejandra Deheza and Benjamin Curtis, except when noted

| No. | Title | Length |
|---|---|---|
| 1. | "Ablaze" | 5:09 |
| 2. | "On My Heart" | 4:17 |
| 3. | "Open Your Eyes" | 4:19 |
| 4. | "A Thousand Times More" | 4:30 |
| 5. | "Elias" | 4:22 |
| 6. | "Signals" | 3:45 |
| 7. | "Music Takes Me" (Curtis, Alejandra Deheza, and Claudia Deheza) | 5:10 |
| 8. | "Confusion" | 4:59 |
| 9. | "This Is Our Time" | 5:17 |

== Personnel ==
- Alejandra Deheza – vocals
- Benjamin Curtis – engineering, production
- Justin Meldal-Johnsen - production, additional guitar, bass, drums, keyboards, percussion
- Brandon Curtis, Chris Bellman, Mike Schuppan - engineering
- Carlos de la Garza, Gabe Wax, Nicholas Vernhes, Steve Choo - additional engineering
- Guy Licata - additional guitar and drums
- Bryan Abdul Collins - art direction, design
- Dave Cooley - mastering
- Tony Hoffer - mixing
- Cameron Lister - mixing assistant

== Charts ==
| Chart (2016) | Peak position |
|---|---|
| Scottish Albums (OCC) | 45 |
| UK Albums (OCC) | 54 |
| UK Independent Albums (OCC) | 10 |
| US Independent Albums (Billboard) | 13 |
| US Heatseekers Albums (Billboard) | 1 |
| US Top Rock Albums (Billboard) | 24 |
| US Top Alternative Albums (Billboard) | 17 |
| US Top Album Sales (Billboard) | 89 |
| US Top Tastemaker Albums (Billboard) | 13 |
