= Alpinisms =

Studio album by School of Seven Bells
- Released: October 28, 2008
- Studio: Painted Girl Studios, New York, U.S.; Stratosphere Sound, New York, U.S.
- Genre: Electronic; dream pop; shoegaze
- Length: 55:00
- Label: Ghostly International

School of Seven Bells chronology
Alpinisms (2008)	Disconnect from Desire (2010)

Singles from Alpinisms
- 1. "My Cabal" Released: 2007; 2. "Half Asleep" Released: 2008; 3. "Iamundernodisguise" Released: 2009

Alpinisms is the debut studio album by American band School of Seven Bells. It was originally released on Ghostly International on October 28, 2008, and re-released on Vagrant Records on July 14, 2009. The deluxe edition with bonus tracks was released on October 13, 2009. The album peaked at number 17 on the UK Independent Albums Chart.

== Background ==
In 2004, Alejandra Deheza and her twin sister Claudia (both of On!Air!Library!) met Benjamin Curtis (of Secret Machines) when they were on tour with Interpol. In 2007, they formed School of Seven Bells and started making music together. The group's debut studio album, whose working title was Wired for Light, was officially titled Alpinisms.

== Critical reception ==
Professional ratings
Aggregate scores
Source	Rating
Metacritic	70/100
Review scores
Source	Rating
AllMusic	4.5/5 stars
Consequence	B
The Guardian	4/5 stars
The Line of Best Fit	78%
MusicOMH	4.5/5 stars
Pitchfork	8.0/10
PopMatters	7/10
Rolling Stone	3.5/5 stars
Slant Magazine	3/5 stars
Tiny Mix Tapes	4/5 stars

According to the review aggregator Metacritic, Alpinisms received "generally favorable reviews" based on a weighted average score of 70 out of 100 from 23 critic scores.

Eric Harvey of Pitchfork said, "Throughout Alpinisms, the group finds a perfect middle ground between the indie realms of tribal and choral, layering electronic flourishes without letting them overwhelm the arrangements." M. R. Newmark of PopMatters commented that "School of Seven Bells hit the sweet spot with enough frequency to make Alpinisms worthwhile, and though not every experiment works, it should give those who have been following these musicians around some satisfaction to realize that this is the sort of album they've been waiting so long to create." Lukas Suveg of Tiny Mix Tapes stated, "Although this final version could have featured more diverse song selections, Alpinisms is an undoubtedly singular album, setting the bar quite high for this burgeoning trio."

=== Accolades ===
Publication	List	Rank	Ref.
MusicOMH	Top 50 Best Albums of 2009	24	
NME	Best Albums of 2008	42	

== Track listing ==
No.	Title	Length
1.	"Iamundernodisguise"	3:48
2.	"Face to Face on High Places"	4:41
3.	"Half Asleep"	4:21
4.	"Wired for Light"	4:57
5.	"For Kalaja Mari"	4:18
6.	"White Elephant Coat"	4:18
7.	"Connjur"	4:40
8.	"Sempiternal/Amaranth"	11:26
9.	"Chain"	4:22
10.	"Prince of Peace"	3:06
11.	"My Cabal"	5:09
Total length:		55:00

UK edition bonus tracks
No.	Title	Length
12.	"Trance Figure"	3:29
13.	"If I Had Glass Hands and Glass Feet"	2:16

Japanese and digital edition bonus tracks
No.	Title	Length
12.	"If I Had Glass Hands and Glass Feet"	2:16

Deluxe edition bonus tracks
No.	Title	Length
12.	"Wired for Light" (Live Drum Version)	3:51
13.	"Half Asleep" (Alternate Version)	4:32
14.	"White Elephant Coat" (Early Demo Version)	3:53
15.	"Caldo" (Live on Stereogum's Decomposed)	3:00
16.	"Sempiternal" (Alternate Version)	11:16
17.	"Iamundernodisguise" (Vocal Mix I)	3:41
18.	"My Cabal" (Early Mix 07)	3:49
19.	"Connjur" (Alternate Version)	4:39
20.	"For Kalaja Mari" (Drum Outtake Mix)	4:22

== Personnel ==
Credits adapted from liner notes.

School of Seven Bells

- Benjamin Curtis – music, recording, mixing
- Alejandra Deheza – music, recording, mixing
- Claudia Deheza – music, recording, mixing

Additional musicians

- Simone Pace – drums (8)
- Niki Randa – vocals (10)

Technical personnel

- Geoff Sanoff – recording (8)
- Joe Lambert – mastering
- Bryan Collins – cover design

== Charts ==
Chart (2009)	Peak position
French Albums (SNEP)	142
UK Independent Albums (OCC)	17
