= Now Here Is Nowhere =

Studio album by Secret Machines
- Released: May 18, 2004
- Studio: Stratosphere Sound, New York City
- Genre: Alternative rock; progressive rock; space rock
- Length: 50:35
- Label: Reprise; WEA
- Producer: Jeff Blenkinsopp; Secret Machines

Secret Machines chronology
September 000 (2002)	Now Here Is Nowhere (2004)	The Road Leads Where It's Led (2005)

Singles from Now Here Is Nowhere
- 1. "Nowhere Again" Released: July 26, 2004; 2. "Sad and Lonely" Released: December 27, 2004; 3. "The Road Leads Where It's Led" Released: April 11, 2005

Professional ratings
Aggregate scores
Source	Rating
Metacritic	80/100
Review scores
Source	Rating
AllMusic	4/5 stars
Blender	4/5 stars
The Guardian	5/5 stars
The Irish Times	4/5 stars
Mojo	4/5 stars
NME	7/10
Pitchfork	8.2/10
Q	4/5 stars
Rolling Stone	3/5 stars
Uncut	4/5 stars

Now Here is Nowhere is the debut studio album by American rock band Secret Machines. It was released on May 18, 2004. The songs on the album are reminiscent of Pink Floyd and Led Zeppelin, with krautrock and shoegaze influences.

== Track listing ==
All tracks are written by Benjamin Curtis, Brandon Curtis, Josh Garza.

No.	Title	Length
1.	"First Wave Intact"	9:00
2.	"Sad and Lonely"	4:41
3.	"The Leaves are Gone"	4:06
4.	"Nowhere Again"	4:13
5.	"The Road Leads Where It’s Led"	4:42
6.	"Pharaoh’s Daughter"	5:45
7.	"You Are Chains"	5:49
8.	"Light’s On"	3:26
9.	"Now Here Is Nowhere"	8:53
Total length:		50:35

== Personnel ==
- Brandon Curtis - vocals, bass guitar, keyboard
- Benjamin Curtis - guitar, backing vocals
- Josh Garza - drums
