= Dust devil (disambiguation) =

A dust devil is a strong, well-formed, and relatively long-lived whirlwind.

Dust devil or similar terms may also refer to:

== Music ==
- Dustdevils, an American noise rock band
- "Dust Devil" (song), a 2009 song by Madness
- "Dust Devil", a song by Butthole Surfers from Independent Worm Saloon
- "Dust Devil", a song by Muzzy
- "Dust Devil", a song by School of Seven Bells from Disconnect from Desire

== Other uses ==
- Dust Devil (film), a 1992 horror film by Richard Stanley
- Dust Devils (game), a 2002 role-playing game set in the American Old West
- Martian dust devils, which took place on Mars rather than Earth
- Tri-City Dust Devils, an American minor-league baseball team in Pasco, Washington
- Dust Devil I, a member of the Blasters in the DC Comics universe
- Dust Devil II, a member of the Masters of Disaster in the DC Comics universe
- Dust Devil, Australian musician and composer of the original theme music for the Cartoon Network programming block Adult Swim
