= UFOFU =

American rock band

- Origin: Dallas, Texas, U.S.
- Genres: Indie rock, garage rock
- Years active: 1993–1998
- Labels: The Medicine Label, Direct Hit Records, Time Bomb Recordings, Square Target Records
- Spinoffs: The Secret Machines
- Past members: Joseph Butcher; Brandon Curtis; Benjamin Curtis

UFOFU was a rock band based in Dallas, Texas. The band consisted of Joseph Butcher, and brothers Brandon Curtis and Ben Curtis. It rose to local prominence in the mid-1990s through word of mouth and slots opening for other north Texas bands such as Hagfish and Tripping Daisy. While touring, the band opened for Local H, Smoking Popes, The Geraldine Fibbers and Spacehog.

In 1997, they released their self-titled debut album on The Medicine Label. The band broke up in 1998. Butcher joined Ben Kweller's band Radish, Benjamin Curtis joined Tripping Daisy, and Brandon Curtis joined Captain Audio.

The Curtis brothers went on to form the Secret Machines in 2000. Benjamin Curtis left the band in 2007 to form School of Seven Bells.

== Discography ==
- Rephotographed (7-inch on Low Records), 1993
- UFOFU (10-inch on Direct Hit Records)
- What You Are (7-inch on Square Target Records), 1996
- UFOFU (CD on The Medicine Label), 1997
- UFOFU (7-inch on Time Bomb Recordings)
