= Pharaoh's Daughter (disambiguation) =

Pharaoh's Daughter is a world music band from New York.

Pharaoh's Daughter may also refer to:

- Pharaoh's daughter (Exodus), who found the baby Moses in the Nile in the book of Exodus
- Pharaoh's daughter (wife of Solomon), a figure from the Hebrew Scriptures
- The Pharaoh's Daughter, a classical ballet choreographed by Marius Petipa
- Pharaoh's Daughter, a collection of poetry by Nuala Ní Dhomhnaill published in 1990
- "Pharaoh's Daughter", a song by The Secret Machines from their album Now Here Is Nowhere
