= List of 2010 deaths in popular music =

This is a list of notable performers of rock music and other forms of popular music, and others directly associated with the music as producers, songwriters, or in other closely related roles, who died in 2010.

== 2010 deaths in popular music ==
Preceded by 2009	List of deaths in popular music 2010	Succeeded by 2011

Name	Age	Date	Location	Cause of death
Gregory Slay; Remy Zero	40	January 1, 2010	Bodega Bay, California, U.S.	Cystic fibrosis
Tony Clarke; Record producer from The Moody Blues	68	January 4, 2010	Brighton, East Sussex, England	Emphysema
Neil Christian	66	January 4, 2010	U.K.	Cancer
Sandro de América	64	January 4, 2010	Guaymallén, Mendoza, Argentina	Septic shock
Willie Mitchell	81	January 5, 2010	Memphis, Tennessee, U.S.	Cardiac arrest
Woody Cunningham; Kleeer	61	January 9, 2010	Bowie, Maryland, U.S.	Cause unknown
Mick Green; Johnny Kidd & The Pirates	65	January 11, 2010	Ilford, Essex, England	Heart failure
Jimmy O	35	January 12, 2010	Port-au-Prince, Haiti	Killed and crushed in Haiti earthquake 2010
Yabby You	63	January 12, 2010	Clarendon Parish, Jamaica	Brain aneurysm
Jay Reatard; Lost Sounds, The Reatards	29	January 13, 2010	Memphis, Tennessee, U.S.	Cocaine and alcohol toxicity
Teddy Pendergrass; Harold Melvin & the Blue Notes	59	January 13, 2010	Bryn Mawr, Pennsylvania, U.S.	Respiratory failure
Jim Korthe; 3rd Strike, Phantasm	39	January 13, 2010	San Pedro, California, U.S.	Natural causes
Ed Thigpen	79	January 13, 2010	Copenhagen, Denmark	Heart and lung problems
Eddie Edehill; The Valentines	74	January 13, 2010	Gladwyne, Pennsylvania, U.S.	Heart attack
Bobby Charles	71	January 14, 2010	Abbeville, Louisiana, U.S.	Natural causes
Mike "Ace" Evans; The Action	64	January 15, 2010	London, England	Heart attack
Carl Smith	82	January 16, 2010	Franklin, Tennessee, U.S.	Natural causes
Kate McGarrigle	63	January 18, 2010	St. John's, Newfoundland, Canada	Cancer
Lynn Taitt	75	January 20, 2010	Montreal, Quebec, Canada	Cancer
Geoff Workman; Record producer for Toto, The Cars, Drivin N Cryin, Foreigner and Mötley Crüe	62	January 21, 2010	Aurora, Colorado, U.S.	Liver failure
Robert "Squirrel" Lester; The Chi-Lites	67	January 21, 2010	Chicago, Illinois, U.S.	Liver cancer
Apache	45	January 22, 2010	Bethlehem, Pennsylvania, U.S.	Undisclosed causes
Earl Wild	94	January 23, 2010	Palm Springs, California, U.S.	Heart failure
Shirley Collie Nelson	78	January 27, 2010	Springfield, Missouri, U.S.	After a long illness
Pauly Fuemana; OMC	40	January 31, 2010	North Shore City, New Zealand	Chronic inflammatory demyelinating polyneuropathy
Herman Curtis Dunham; The Solitaires	73	January 31, 2010	Harlem, New York City, U.S.	Lung cancer
Mallia Franklin; Parliament	57	February 5, 2010	Los Angeles, California, United States	Unknown
John Dankworth	82	February 6, 2010	Marylebone, London, England	After a long illness
Richard Delvy; Drummer for The Challengers/The Bel-Airs	67	February 6, 2010	Los Angeles, California, U.S.	Pneumonia
Malcolm Vaughan	80	February 9, 2010	Eastbourne, East Sussex, England	Alzheimer's disease
Sylvia Shemwell; Record producer for "The Sweet Inspirations" also backup for Aretha Franklin, Elvis Presley, Van Morrison etc.	68	February 13, 2010	Winnetka, California, United States	Complications from a stroke
Dale Hawkins	73	February 13, 2010	Little Rock, Arkansas, U.S.	Colorectal cancer
Doug Fieger; The Knack	57	February 14, 2010	Woodland Hills, California, U.S.	Cancer
Lee Freeman; Rhythm guitar for The Strawberry Alarm Clock	60	February 14, 2010	Glendale, California, U.S.	Cancer
Lil' Dave Thompson	40	February 14, 2010	Aiken County, South Carolina, U.S.	Car crash
Kathryn Grayson	88	February 17, 2010	Los Angeles, California, U.S.	Natural causes
Ines Paulke; Motiv; Danzu	51	February 17, 2010	Thannhausen, Bavaria, Germany	Suicide
Lonnie Heard; The 5 Dollars	72	February 23, 2010	Highland Park, Michigan, United States	Unknown
Edmundas Čivinskas; Vocalist for Vairas	49	February 24, 2010	Kaunas, Lithuania	Hepatitis B
Nujabes; Record producer	36	February 26, 2010	Shibuya, Tokyo, Japan	Traffic collision
Larry Cassidy; Section 25	56	February 27, 2010	Blackpool, England	Blood clot
Tom Wolk; Hall & Oates, Billy Joel Band, Saturday Night Live Band	58	February 28, 2010	Pawling, New York, U.S.	Heart attack
Big Tiny Little (Dudley Little); Solo/Lawrence Welk/Various	79	March 3, 2010	Carson City, Nevada, U.S.	Natural causes
Etta Cameron	70	March 4, 2010	Aarhus, Denmark	After a long illness
Ron Banks; The Dramatics	58	March 4, 2010	Detroit, Michigan, U.S.	Heart attack
Lolly Vegas; Redbone	70	March 4, 2010	Los Angeles, California, U.S.	Lung cancer
Bud Cockrell; It's a Beautiful Day	59	March 6, 2010	Hinds County, Mississippi, U.S.	Complications from diabetes
Mark Linkous; Sparklehorse	47	March 6, 2010	Knoxville, Tennessee, U.S.	Suicide by gunshot
Rich Parris; Guitarist for Animal Bag	47	March 9, 2010	Charlotte, North Carolina, United States	Ruptured ulcer
Lesley Duncan	66	March 12, 2010	Isle of Mull, Scotland	Cerebrovascular disease
Cherie DeCastro; The DeCastro Sisters	87	March 14, 2010	Las Vegas, Nevada, U.S.	Pneumonia
Alex Chilton; The Box Tops, Big Star	59	March 17, 2010	New Orleans, Louisiana, U.S.	Heart attack
Diz Disley	78	March 22, 2010	London, England	
Gino Baldi Italian singer	87	March 22, 2010	Bogotà, Colombia	
Jim Marshall; Rock and roll photographer	74	March 24, 2010	New York City, New York, U.S.	
Herb Ellis	88	March 28, 2010	Los Angeles, California, U.S.	Alzheimer's disease
Nicola Arigliano Italian singer and actor	86	March 30, 2010	Calimera, Lecce, Italy	
Vinnie Chas; Pretty Boy Floyd	46	April 6, 2010	Vancouver, Washington, U.S.	
Jerry Byrne	69	April 7, 2010	Morgan City, Louisiana, U.S.	Lung cancer
Eddie Johnson	89	April 7, 2010	Chicago, Illinois, U.S.	
Malcolm McLaren; Manager for Sex Pistols	64	April 8, 2010	Bellinzona, Ticino, Switzerland	Peritoneal mesothelioma
Steve Reid	66	April 13, 2010	New York City, New York, U.S.	Throat cancer
Peter Steele; Type O Negative, Carnivore	48	April 14, 2010	Brooklyn, New York, U.S.	Aortic aneurysm
Guru; Gang Starr	48	April 19, 2010	New York City, New York, U.S.	Multiple myeloma
Owsley	44	April 30, 2010	Franklin, Tennessee, U.S.	Suicide
Eddie L. Jackson; Brenda & the Tabulations	63	May 3, 2010	Philadelphia, Pennsylvania, U.S.	Brain aneurysm
Lena Horne; Singer, dancer, actress, and activist	92	May 9, 2010	Manhattan, New York City, U.S.	Congestive heart failure
Ronnie James Dio; Dio, Black Sabbath, Rainbow, Elf	67	May 16, 2010	Houston, Texas, U.S.	Stomach cancer
Hank Jones	91	May 16, 2010	The Bronx, New York, U.S.	
Beaver	59	May 23, 2010	Auckland, New Zealand	Sarcoma
Paul Gray; Slipknot	38	May 24, 2010	Urbandale, Iowa, U.S.	Drug overdose
Steve New; Rich Kids	50	May 24, 2010	London, England,	Cancer
Ali-Ollie Woodson; The Temptations	58	May 30, 2010	Los Angeles, California, U.S.	Leukemia
Marvin Isley; The Isley Brothers	56	June 6, 2010	Chicago, Illinois, U.S.	Complications due to diabetes
Calvin Leavy	70	June 6, 2010	Pine Bluff, Arkansas, U.S.	
Stuart Cable; Stereophonics	40	June 7, 2010	Llwydcoed, Wales	Asphyxiation on vomit
Walt Woodward III; Twisted Sister, Shark Island, The Painkillers, Sweet Savage	51	June 8, 2010	Woodland Park, New Jersey	Liver failure
Crispian St. Peters	71	June 8, 2010	Swanley, United Kingdom	Unknown
Garry Shider; Parliament-Funkadelic	56	June 16, 2010	Greater Upper Marlboro, Maryland, U.S.	Lung cancer
Vanna Brosio Italian singer, television host and actress	67	June 19, 2010	Turin, Italy	Long and serious illness
Peter Quaife; The Kinks	66	June 23, 2010	Copenhagen, Denmark	Kidney failure
Sergio Vega	40	June 26, 2010	Los Mochis, Sinaloa, Mexico	Shot
Park Yong-ha	32	June 30, 2010	Seoul, South Korea	Suicide
Ilene Woods; Disney's Cinderella	81	July 1, 2010	Los Angeles, California, U.S.	Alzheimer's disease
Harvey Fuqua; The Moonglows	80	July 6, 2010	Detroit, Michigan, U.S.	Heart attack
Lelio Luttazzi Italian pianist, actor, singer, composer, conductor, showman, television and radio host, writer and director	87	July 8, 2010	Trieste, Italy	
Sugar Minott	54	July 10, 2010	Saint Andrew Parish, Jamaica	
Tuli Kupferberg; The Fugs	86	July 12, 2010	New York City, U.S.	Kidney failure
Madalina Manole	43	July 14, 2010	Otopeni, Romania	Suicide
Fred Carter Jr.	76	July 17, 2010	Nashville, Tennessee, U.S.	Stroke
Andy Hummel; Big Star	59	July 19, 2010	Weatherford, Texas, U.S.	Cancer
Phillip Walker	73	July 22, 2010	Palm Springs, California, U.S.	Heart failure
Al Goodman; Ray, Goodman & Brown	67	July 26, 2010	Hackensack, New Jersey, U.S.	Heart failure
Ben Keith; Great Speckled Band	73	July 26, 2010	La Honda, California, U.S.	Blood clot in lung
Art Mineo	91	July 27, 2010	Tacoma, Washington, U.S.	Pulmonary Fibrosis
Derf Scratch; Fear	58	July 28, 2010	Camarillo, California, U.S.	Liver disease
Mario Bonura Italian singer-songwriter	62	July 28, 2010	Salemi, Trapani, Italy	
Mitch Miller	99	July 31, 2010	New York, New York, U.S.	Short illness
Bobby Hebb	72	August 3, 2010	Nashville, Tennessee, U.S.	Lung cancer
Catfish Collins; Parliament-Funkadelic, The J.B.'s	66	August 6, 2010	Cincinnati, Ohio, U.S.	Cancer
Calvin "Fuzz" Jones	84	August 9, 2010	Southaven, Mississippi, U.S.	Lung cancer
Dana Dawson	36	August 10, 2010	New York U.S.	Colorectal cancer
Richie Hayward; Little Feat	64	August 12, 2010	Victoria, British Columbia, Canada	Liver cancer
Abbey Lincoln	80	August 14, 2010	Manhattan, New York, New York, U.S.	Complications from open-heart surgery
Kenny Edwards; The Stone Poneys	64	August 18, 2010	Santa Barbara, California, U.S.	Prostate cancer
Michael Been; The Call	60	August 19, 2010	Hasselt, Belgium	Heart attack
Charles Haddon; Ou Est le Swimming Pool	22	August 20, 2010	Hasselt, Belgium	Suicide after injuring a concertgoer
Mike Edwards; Electric Light Orchestra	62	September 3, 2010	Halwell, Devon, England	Traffic accident
Hadley Caliman	78	September 8, 2010	Seattle, Washington, U.S.	
Rich Cronin; LFO	36	September 8, 2010	Boston, Massachusetts, U.S.	Leukemia and stroke
King Coleman	78	September 11, 2010	Miami, Florida, U.S.	
Arrow (Alphonsus Cassell)	60	September 15, 2010	Montserrat, West Indies	Cerebral cancer
Buddy Collette	89	September 19, 2010	Los Angeles, California, U.S.	Heart failure
Don Partridge	68	September 21, 2010	Peacehaven, East Sussex, England	Heart attack
Eddie Fisher	82	September 22, 2010	Berkeley, California, U.S.	Complications from hip surgery
Sandra Mondaini Italian actress, television host and singer	79	September 23, 2010	Milan, Italy	
Dick Griffey; Founder of SOLAR Records	71	September 24, 2010	Canoga Park, Los Angeles, California, U.S.	Complications from coronary artery bypass surgery
Ed Wiley, Jr.	80	September 27, 2010	Garner, North Carolina, U.S.	Injuries sustained in fall
Oscar Avogadro Italian lyricist	59	September 30, 2010	Mediglia, Milan, Italy	
Steve Lee; Gotthard	47	October 5, 2010	Mesquite, Nevada, U.S.	Traffic accident
Ian Morris; Th' Dudes, Tex Pistol	53	October 7, 2010	Napier, New Zealand	Suicide
Reg King; The Action	65	October 8, 2010	Belvedere, London Borough of Bexley, Greater London, England	Cancer
Solomon Burke	70	October 10, 2010	Badhoevedorp, Netherlands	Pulmonary embolism
General Johnson; Chairmen of the Board, The Showmen	69	October 13, 2010	Atlanta, U.S.	Lung cancer
Eyedea; Eyedea & Abilities	28	October 16, 2010	Saint Paul, Minnesota, U.S.	Accidental drug overdose
Marion Brown	79	October 18, 2010	Hollywood, Florida, U.S.	
Remo Germani Italian singer	72	October 18, 2010	Vigevano, Italy	Long illness and complications from the diabetes he had suffered from for some time
Benedetto Arico (Bino) Italian singer	57	October 19, 2010	Palermo, Italy	Brain tumor
Ari Up; The Slits	48	October 20, 2010	Los Angeles, California, U.S.	Cancer
Antonio "Uccio" Aloisi Italian singer and musician	82	October 21, 2010	Cutrofiano, Lecce, Italy	
Denis Simpson; The Nylons	59	October 22, 2010	Toronto, Ontario, Canada	Brain hemorrhage
Gregory Isaacs	59	October 25, 2010	London, England	Lung cancer
Jim Clench; April Wine, Loverboy, Bachman–Turner Overdrive	61	November 3, 2010	Montreal, Quebec, Canada	Lung cancer
James Freud; Models	51	November 4, 2010	Melbourne, Victoria, Australia	
Randy Miller; The Myriad	39	November 5, 2010	Redding, California, U.S.	Bone cancer
Robert Curtis Smith	80	November 10, 2010	Chicago, Illinois, U.S.	
Roberto Pregadio Italian pianist	81	November 15, 2010	Rome, Italy	Incurable illness
Peter Christopherson; Throbbing Gristle, Coil	55	November 25, 2010	Bangkok, Thailand	
Trev Thoms; Inner City Unit, Atomgods, Steve Took's Horns	60	December 8, 2010	Brighton, England	Pancreatic cancer
James Moody	85	December 9, 2010	San Diego, California, U.S.	Pancreatic cancer
Captain Beefheart; Captain Beefheart and the Magic Band	69	December 17, 2010	Glendale, California, U.S.	Complications from multiple sclerosis
Magnolia Shorty	28	December 20, 2010	Edgelake, New Orleans, Louisiana, U.S.	Shot and killed by gang members
Jack Tracy; Record producer and music journalist	84	December 21, 2010	Nooksack, Washington, U.S.	
Myrna Smith; The Sweet Inspirations	69	December 24, 2010	Canoga Park, Los Angeles, U.S.	Kidney failure
Teena Marie	54	December 26, 2010	Pasadena, California, U.S.	Natural causes
Bernard Wilson; Harold Melvin & the Blue Notes	64	December 26, 2010	Voorhees, New Jersey, U.S.	Stroke and heart attack
Billy Taylor	89	December 28, 2010	New York City, U.S.	Heart attack
Nick Santo; Lead Singer for The Capris	69	December 30, 2010	Mineola, Nassau, New York, U.S.	Cancer
Bobby Farrell; Boney M	61	December 30, 2010	Saint Petersburg, Russia	Heart failure

== See also ==
- List of murdered hip hop musicians
- 27 Club
