= List of 2012 deaths in popular music =

This is a list of notable performers of rock music and other forms of popular music, and others directly associated with the music as producers, songwriters, or in other closely related roles, who died in 2012.

== 2012 deaths in popular music ==
Preceded by 2011	List of deaths in popular music 2012	Succeeded by 2013

Name	Age	Date	Location	Cause of death
Enrico Gentile Italian singer and lyricist, best known for being one of the founders of the first formation of the Quartetto Cetra	91	2012	Palermo, Italy	
Larry Reinhardt; Iron Butterfly, Captain Beyond	63	January 2, 2012	Bradenton, Florida, U.S.	Complications from cirrhosis
Bob Weston; Fleetwood Mac	64	January 3, 2012	Brent Cross, London, England	Gastrointestinal hemorrhage
Dave Alexander	73	January 8, 2012	Marshall, Texas, U.S.	Suicide by gunshot
Robbie France; Alphaville, Skunk Anansie	52	January 14, 2012	Mazarrón, Spain	Ruptured aorta
Jimmy Castor; The Jimmy Castor Bunch, The Teenagers	71	January 16, 2012	Henderson, Nevada, U.S.	Heart failure
Johnny Otis	90	January 17, 2012	Los Angeles, California, U.S.	Natural causes
Giancarlo Bigazzi Italian record producer and composer	71	January 19, 2012	Viareggio, Italy	
Etta James	73	January 20, 2012	Riverside, California, U.S.	Leukemia
Doris Brasch; South African singer	82	January 21, 2012	South Africa	
Mark Reale; Riot	56	January 25, 2012	San Antonio, Texas, U.S.	Subarachnoid hemorrhage related to Crohn's disease
King Stitt	71	January 31, 2012	Kingston, Jamaica	Prostate cancer
Don Cornelius; Host of Soul Train	75	February 1, 2012	Sherman Oaks, California, U.S.	Suicide by gunshot
David Peaston	54	February 1, 2012	St. Louis Missouri, U.S.	Diabetes
Noel Kelehan; Jazz pianist and longtime conductor for Ireland at the Eurovision Song Contest	76	February 6, 2012	Dublin, Ireland	After a long illness
Luis Alberto Spinetta; Almendra, Pescado Rabioso, Invisible, Spinetta Jade	62	February 8, 2012	Buenos Aires, Argentina	Lung cancer
Whitney Houston	48	February 11, 2012	Los Angeles, California, U.S.	Drowning due to cocaine intoxication
Tonmi Lillman; Sinergy, To/Die/For, Lordi, Kylähullut	38	February 13, 2012	Helsinki, Finland	
Dory Previn	86	February 14, 2012	Southfield, Massachusetts, U.S.	Natural causes
Michael Davis; MC5, Destroy All Monsters	68	February 17, 2012	Chico, California, U.S.	Liver failure
Christopher Reimer; Women	26	February 21, 2012	Calgary, Alberta, Canada	Heart condition
Billy Strange	81	February 22, 2012	Franklin, Tennessee, U.S.	
Red Holloway	84	February 25, 2012	Morro Bay, California, U.S.	Stroke and kidney failure
Louisiana Red	79	February 25, 2012	Hanover, Germany	Stroke
Roland Bautista; Earth, Wind & Fire	60	February 29, 2012	U.S.	Natural causes
Davy Jones; The Monkees	66	February 29, 2012	Indiantown, Florida, U.S.	Heart attack
Lucio Dalla	68	March 1, 2012	Montreux, Switzerland	Heart attack
Ronnie Montrose; Edgar Winter Group, Montrose, Gamma	64	March 3, 2012	San Francisco Bay Area, U.S.	Suicide by gunshot
Robert B. Sherman; The Sherman Brothers	86	March 6, 2012	London, England	Undisclosed causes
Lucia Mannucci Italian singer	91	March 7, 2012	Milan, Italy	
Jimmy Ellis; The Trammps	74	March 8, 2012	Rock Hill, South Carolina, U.S.	Alzheimer's disease
Hans G. Helms	79	March 11, 2012	Friedrichshain, Berlin, Germany	Natural causes
Michael Hossack; The Doobie Brothers	65	March 12, 2012	Dubois, Wyoming, U.S.	Cancer
Ken Lyons; 38 Special	59	March 20, 2012	Winston-Salem, North Carolina, U.S.	
Vince Lovegrove; The Valentines	65	March 24, 2012	Bangalow, New South Wales, Australia	Traffic accident
Leila Selli Italian singer	71	March 25, 2012	Rome, Italy	
Jerry McCain	81	March 28, 2012	Gadsden, Alabama, U.S.	Natural causes
Earl Scruggs	88	March 28, 2012	Nashville, Tennessee, U.S.	Natural causes
Jim Marshall; Founder and owner of Marshall Amplification	88	April 5, 2012	Milton Keynes, Buckinghamshire, England	Natural causes
Andrew Love	70	April 12, 2012	Memphis, Tennessee, U.S.	Alzheimer's disease
Nico Tirone Italian singer, leader of the beat music group Nico dei Gabbiani	67	April 12, 2012	Mazara del Vallo, Trapani, Italy	
Krzysztof Puszyński; Golec uOrkiestra	54	April 14/15, 2012	Rycerka Dolna, Beskids region, Poland	Heart attack
Graham Simpson; Roxy Music	68	April 16, 2012	Ladbroke Grove, London, England	Cancer
Dick Clark; Host of American Bandstand	82	April 18, 2012	Santa Monica, California, U.S.	Heart attack
Levon Helm; The Band	71	April 19, 2012	New York City, New York, U.S.	Cancer
Greg Ham; Men At Work	58	April 19, 2012	Carlton North, Victoria, Australia	Heart attack
Chris Ethridge; International Submarine Band, The Flying Burrito Brothers	65	April 23, 2012	Meridian, Mississippi, U.S.	Pancreatic cancer
Tommy Marth; The Killers	33	April 23, 2012	Las Vegas, Nevada, U.S.	Suicide
Jimmy Bond; The Routers	79	April 26, 2012	Los Angeles, California, U.S.	Cardiopulmonary disease
Giorgio Consolini Italian singer	91	April 28, 2012	Bologna, Italy	
Charles Pitts	65	May 1, 2012	Memphis, Tennessee, U.S.	Cancer
Adam Yauch; Beastie Boys	47	May 4, 2012	Brooklyn, New York, U.S.	Parotid gland cancer
Michael Burks	54	May 6, 2012	Atlanta, Georgia, U.S.	Heart attack
Donald "Duck" Dunn; Booker T. & the M.G.'s	70	May 13, 2012	Tokyo, Japan	Natural causes
Chuck Brown	75	May 16, 2012	Baltimore, Maryland, U.S.	Multiple organ failure
Doug Dillard; The Dillards, Dillard & Clark	75	May 16, 2012	Nashville, Tennessee, U.S.	Lung infection
Donna Summer	63	May 17, 2012	Englewood, Florida, U.S.	Lung cancer
Warda Al-Jazairia Algerian singer and musician	72	May 17, 2012	Cairo, Egypt	
Robin Gibb; Bee Gees	62	May 20, 2012	Chelsea, London, England	Liver and kidney failure from colorectal cancer
Doc Watson	89	May 29, 2012	Winston-Salem, North Carolina, U.S.	Complications following colon surgery
Pete Cosey	68	May 30, 2012	Chicago, Illinois, U.S.	Complications following surgery
Eduard Khil; Russian singer	77	June 4, 2012	Saint Petersburg, Russia	Stroke
Herb Reed; The Platters	83	June 4, 2012	Boston, Massachusetts, U.S.	Heart disease
Bob Welch; Fleetwood Mac	66	June 7, 2012	Antioch, Tennessee, U.S.	Suicide by gunshot
Audrey Arno German singer and actress	84	June 9, 2012	Las Vegas, Nevada, U.S.	Alzheimer's disease
Claudio Celli Italian singer , lyricist , actor and record producer	82	June 9, 2012	Grosseto, Italy	
Gerry Bron; Record producer and band manager from Bonzo Dog Doo-Dah Band	79	June 18, 2012	Hendon, Middlesex, England	
Brian Hibbard; The Flying Pickets	65	June 18, 2012	Cardiff, Wales	Prostate cancer
Laura Villa Italian singer	82	July 1, 2012	Sanremo, Italy	
Dennis Flemion; The Frogs	57	July 7, 2012	Racine County, Wisconsin, U.S.	Drowning
Dino Cassio Italian actor and singer	78	July 9, 2012	Rome, Italy	Alzheimer s'disease
Bob Babbitt; MFSB	74	July 16, 2012	Nashville, Tennessee, U.S.	Brain cancer
Jon Lord; Deep Purple, Whitesnake, Paice Ashton Lord, The Artwoods, The Flower Pot Men	71	July 16, 2012	London, England	Pulmonary embolism
Franco Andolfo Italian singer and composer with Austrian citizenship, who was successful in his adopted country, where he was known as the " Frank Sinatra of Wörthersee "	74	July 23, 2012	Vienna, Austria	Stroke
Larry Hoppen; Orleans	61	July 24, 2012	Sanford, Florida, U.S.	Suicide
Tony Martin	98	July 27, 2012	Los Angeles, California, U.S.	Natural causes
Bill Doss; The Olivia Tremor Control, The Sunshine Fix, The Apples in Stereo	43	July 30, 2012	Athens, Georgia, U.S.	Aneurysm
Tony Sly; No Use for a Name	41	July 31, 2012	San Jose, California, U.S.	Drug overdose
Jimmy Jones	75	August 2, 2012	Aberdeen, North Carolina, U.S.	
Carl Davis; Record producer	77	August 9, 2012	Summerville, South Carolina, U.S.	Pulmonary fibrosis
Von Freeman	88	August 11, 2012	Chicago Illinois, U.S.	Heart failure
Bob Birch; The Elton John Band	56	August 15, 2012	Los Angeles, California, U.S.	Suicide by gunshot
Scott McKenzie	73	August 18, 2012	Los Angeles, California, U.S.	Guillain–Barré syndrome
Joe South	72	September 5, 2012	Buford, Georgia, U.S.	Heart failure
James "Sugar Boy" Crawford	77	September 15, 2012	New Orleans, Louisiana, U.S.	
Andy Williams; The Williams Brothers	84	September 25, 2012	Branson, Missouri, U.S.	Bladder cancer
R. B. Greaves	68	September 27, 2012	Granada Hills, California, U.S.	Prostate cancer
Frank Wilson; Record producer for Motown Records	71	September 27, 2012	Duarte, California, U.S.	Prostate cancer
Berkant	73	October 1, 2012	Istanbul, Turkey	Lung cancer
Big Jim Sullivan	71	October 2, 2012	Billingshurst, West Sussex, England	Heart disease and diabetes
Kathi McDonald	64	October 3, 2012	Seattle, Washington, U.S.	
Nick Curran; The Fabulous Thunderbirds	35	October 6, 2012	Austin, Texas, U.S.	Oral cancer
Italo Nicola Greco (Lilli Greco) Italian record producer, composer, musician and arranger	78	October 14, 2012	Grottaferrata, Rome, Italy	
David S. Ware	62	October 19, 2012	New Brunswick, New Jersey, U.S.	
Corrado Lojacono Italian singer, actor, record producer and songwriter	88	October 23, 2012	Milan, Italy	Kidney failure
Bill Dees	73	October 24, 2012	Mountain Home, Arkansas, U.S.	
Natina Reed; Blaque	31	October 26, 2012	Duluth, Georgia, U.S.	Traffic accident
Terry Callier	67	October 27, 2012	Chicago, Illinois, U.S.	Cancer
Eugenijus Ivanauskas; Lithuanian singer	71	October 29, 2012	Kretinga ,Lithuania	
Mitch Lucker; Suicide Silence	28	November 1, 2012	Huntington Beach, California, U.S.	Traffic accident
Leonardo Favio	74	November 5, 2012	Buenos Aires, Argentina	Pneumonia
Major Harris	65	November 9, 2012	Richmond, Virginia, U.S.	Congestive heart and lung failure
Earl Carroll; The Cadillacs, The Coasters	75	November 25, 2012	New York City, New York, U.S.	Compilations from a stroke and diabetes
Chris Stamp; Record producer for The Jimi Hendrix Experience, The Who, The Crazy World of Arthur Brown, Golden Earring and co-founder of Track Records	70	November 24, 2012	New York City, New York, U.S.	Cancer
Mickey Baker	87	November 27, 2012	Toulouse, France	Heart and kidney failure
Dave Brubeck	91	December 5, 2012	Norwalk, Connecticut, U.S.	Congestive heart failure
Ed Cassidy; Spirit	89	December 6, 2012	San Jose, California, U.S.	Cancer
Huw Lloyd-Langton; Hawkwind, Widowmaker	61	December 6, 2012	Dorset, England	Cancer
Jenni Rivera	43	December 9, 2012	Iturbide, Nuevo León, Mexico	Plane crash
Ravi Shankar	92	December 11, 2012	San Diego, California, U.S.	Complications from surgery.
Eddie "Guitar" Burns	84	December 12, 2012	U.S.	Heart failure
Val Haller; Wayne County & the Electric Chairs, The Flying Lizards, The Lords of the New Church, Paint, Savage Republic	60	December 16, 2012	Claremont, California	Suicide
Massimo Dorati Italian singer-songwriter and television writer	59	December 17, 2012	Milan, Italy	
Jimmy McCracklin	91	December 20, 2012	San Pablo, California, U.S.	
Lee Dorman; Iron Butterfly, Captain Beyond	70	December 21, 2012	Laguna Niguel, California, U.S.	Natural causes
Franco Ceccarelli Italian musician and record producer, one of the founders of Equipe 84	70	December 21, 2012	Modena, Italy	
Marva Whitney	68	December 22, 2012	Kansas City, Kansas, U.S.	Pneumonia
Mike Scaccia; Ministry, Rigor Mortis, Revolting Cocks	47	December 22, 2012	Fort Worth, Texas, U.S.	Heart attack
Capital Steez; Pro Era	19	December 23, 2012	Manhattan, New York City, U.S.	Suicide
Fontella Bass	72	December 26, 2012	St. Louis, Missouri, U.S.	Heart attack

== See also ==
- List of murdered hip hop musicians
- 27 Club
