= List of 2011 deaths in popular music =

This is a list of notable performers of rock music and other forms of popular music, and others directly associated with the music as producers, songwriters, or in other closely related roles, who died in 2011.

== 2011 deaths in popular music ==
Preceded by 2010	List of deaths in popular music 2011	Succeeded by 2012

Name	Age	Date	Location	Cause of death
Delia Corleto Italian singer	67	2011	Bologna, Italy	
Gilbert "Gil" Ivan Garfield The Fraternity Brothers	77	January 1, 2011	Los Angeles, California, U.S.	Cancer
Mick Karn; Japan	52	January 4, 2011	Chelsea, London, England	Cancer
Grady Chapman; The Robins	81	January 4, 2011	Los Angeles, California, U.S.	Heart failure
Gerry Rafferty; Stealers Wheel	63	January 4, 2011	Stroud, Gloucestershire, England	Liver failure
Bobby Robinson; Record producer and record label executive	93	January 7, 2011	Harlem, New York City, U.S.	
Trish Keenan; Broadcast	42	January 14, 2011	Warwick, England	Swine flu
Steve Prestwich; Cold Chisel, Little River Band	56	January 16, 2011	Sydney, Australia	Brain tumor
Don Kirshner; Producer of Don Kirshner's Rock Concert	76	January 17, 2011	Boca Raton, Florida, U.S.	Heart failure
Gene Colonnello Singer and composer	75	January 18, 2011	Stradella, Italy	
Gladys Horton; The Marvelettes	65	January 26, 2011	Sherman Oaks, California, U.S.	Stroke
Eddie Mordue	83	January 28, 2011	London, England	
Mark Ryan; The Moors Murderers, Adam and the Ants	51	January 31, 2011	Heath, Cardiff, Wales	Complications from liver damage
Sidney Cipriano; Fat Family	46	February 1, 2011	Sorocaba, São Paulo, Brazil	Heart attack
Clay Hammond	74	February 4, 2011	Houston, Texas, U.S.	
Gary Moore; Thin Lizzy, Colosseum II	58	February 6, 2011	Estepona, Málaga, Spain	Heart attack
Karin Stanek; Czerwono-Czarni	68	February 15, 2011	Wolfenbüttel, Germany	Pneumonia
Sergio Embrioni; Enanitos Verdes	50	February 17, 2011	El Challao, Mendoza, Argentina	Suicide
Mark Tulin; The Electric Prunes	62	February 26, 2011	Avalon, California, U.S.	Heart attack
Eddie Kirkland	87	February 27, 2011	Crystal River, Florida, U.S.	Traffic accident
Johnny Preston	71	March 4, 2011	Beaumont, Texas, U.S.	Heart failure
Mike Starr; Alice in Chains	44	March 8, 2011	Salt Lake City, Utah, U.S.	Drug overdose
Joe Morello	82	March 12, 2011	Irvington, New Jersey, U.S.	
Nilla Pizzi Italian singer and actress	91	March 12, 2011	Milan, Italy	
Big Jack Johnson	70	March 14, 2011	Memphis, Tennessee, U.S.	
Nate Dogg; 213	41	March 15, 2011	Long Beach, California, U.S.	Stroke
Melvin Sparks	64	March 15, 2011	Mount Vernon, New York, U.S.	Diabetes and hypertension
Jet Harris; The Shadows	71	March 18, 2011	Winchester, England	Cancer
Loleatta Holloway	64	March 21, 2011	Los Angeles, California, U.S.	Heart failure
Pinetop Perkins	97	March 21, 2011	Austin, Texas, U.S.	Cardiac arrest
Frankie Sparcello; Exhorder	44	March 22, 2011	New Orleans, Louisiana, U.S.	
Zoogz Rift	57	March 22, 2011	Los Angeles, California	Complications due to diabetes
Calvin Russell	62	April 3, 2011	Garfield, Texas, U.S.	Liver cancer
Scott Columbus; Manowar	54	April 4, 2011	Syracuse, New York, U.S.	Suicide
Roger Nichols; Steely Dan	66	April 9, 2011	Burbank, California, U.S.	Pancreatic cancer
Gerard Smith; TV on the Radio	36	April 20, 2011	New York, U.S.	Lung cancer
Tom King; The Outsiders	68	April 23, 2011	Wickliffe, Ohio, U.S.	Congestive heart failure
Poly Styrene; X-Ray Spex	53	April 25, 2011	Sussex, England	Breast cancer
Phoebe Snow	60	April 26, 2011	Edison, New Jersey, U.S.	Cerebral hemorrhage
Leoncarlo Settimelli Journalist, music critic, and singer-songwriter	73	April 26, 2011	Rome, Italy	
Dag Stokke; TNT, Vagabond	44	April 27, 2011	Norway	Cancer
L.V. Banks	78	May 2, 2011	Chicago, Illinois, U.S.	Heart failure
John Walker; The Walker Brothers	67	May 7, 2011	Los Angeles, California, U.S.	Liver cancer
Cornell Dupree	68	May 8, 2011	Fort Worth, Texas, U.S.	Emphysema
Ivo Pešák; Banjo Band	66	May 9, 2011	Prague, Czech Republic	Complications from bypass surgery
Jack Richardson; Record producer for The Guess Who and Manowar	81	May 13, 2011	London, Ontario, Canada	
Bob Flanigan; The Four Freshmen	84	May 15, 2011	Las Vegas, Nevada, U.S.	Heart failure
Gil Scott-Heron	62	May 27. 2011	New York City, New York, U.S.	Pneumonia
Simon Brint	60	May 29, 2011	Langport, England	Suicide
Ray Bryant	79	June 2, 2011	New York City, New York, U.S.	
Andrew Gold; Wax	59	June 3, 2011	Los Angeles, California, U.S.	Heart failure
Benny Spellman	79	June 3, 2011	Pensacola, Florida, U.S.	Respiratory failure
Martin Rushent; Record producer	62	June 4, 2011	Upper Basildon, Berkshire, United Kingdom	
Seth Putnam; Anal Cunt, Upsidedown Cross	43	June 11, 2011	Newton, Massachusetts, U.S.	Heart attack
Carl Gardner; The Coasters	83	June 12, 2011	Port St. Lucie, Florida, U.S.	Congestive heart failure and vascular dementia
Clarence Clemons; Bruce Springsteen & the E-Street Band	69	June 18, 2011	Palm Beach, Florida, U.S.	Complications caused by stroke
Michael "Würzel" Burston; Motörhead	61	July 9, 2011	England	Ventricular fibrillation
Rob Grill; The Grass Roots	67	July 11, 2011	Orlando, Florida, U.S.	Complications caused by stroke
Jerry Ragovoy	80	July 13, 2011	Manhattan, New York City, U.S.	Stroke
Antonio Prieto Chilean actor and singer	85	July 14, 2011	Santiago, Chile	
Taiji Sawada; X Japan, Loudness	45	July 17, 2011	Saipan, Commonwealth of Northern Marianas Islands, U.S.	Suicide by hanging or possible homicide
Amy Winehouse	27	July 23, 2011	London, England	Alcohol poisoning
Bill Morrissey	59	July 23, 2011	Dalton, Georgia, U.S.	Heart disease
Dan Peek; America	60	July 24, 2011	Farmington, Missouri, U.S.	Fibrinous pericarditis
Armando Marra Neapolitan artist, actor, and singer	74	July 24 2011	Bologna, Italy	
Gene McDaniels	76	July 29, 2011	Kittery Point, Maine, U.S.	
Vytautas Katilius; Manager for Vairas		July 30, 2011	Chicago, Illinois, U.S.	Undisclosed
Andrew McDermott; Threshold	45	August 4, 2011	England	Kidney failure
Marshall Grant; Johnny Cash and The Tennessee Three	83	August 7, 2011	Jonesboro, Arkansas, U.S.	
Jani Lane; Warrant	47	August 11, 2011	Los Angeles, California, U.S.	Alcohol poisoning
Jerry Leiber; Jerry Leiber and Mike Stoller	78	August 22, 2011	San Francisco, California, U.S.	Cardiopulmonary failure
Nickolas Ashford; Ashford & Simpson	70	August 22, 2011	Manhattan, New York City, New York, U.S.	Throat cancer
Laurie McAllister; Bass guitar for The Runaways	54	August 25, 2011	Eugene, Oregon, U.S.	Asthma attack
Frederick "Fred" Farran; The Arbors	74	August 29, 2011	Greenville, Michigan, U.S.	Pneumonia
David "Honeyboy" Edwards	96	August 29, 2011	Chicago, Illinois, U.S.	Congestive heart failure
Massimiliano Chiamenti Italian essayist, translator and poet	43	September 3, 2011	Bologna, Italy	Suicide
Franco Potenza Italian composer and musicologist	89	September 6, 2011	Rome, Italy	
Gino Latilla Italian singer of the 1950s	86	September 11, 2011	Florence, Italy	
Fernando Ciucci Singer, guitarist and lead vocalist of the Italian musical group La Bottega dell'Arte	59	September 12, 2011	Rome, Italy	Short illness
Willie "Big Eyes" Smith	75	September 16, 2011	Chicago, Illinois, U.S.	Stroke
John Du Cann; Atomic Rooster	65	September 21, 2011	Hampstead, North West London, England	Heart attack
Vesta Williams	53	September 22, 2011	El Segundo, California, U.S.	Hypertensive heart disease
Sylvia Robinson	76	September 29, 2011	Secaucus, New Jersey, U.S.	Congestive heart failure
Marv Tarplin; The Miracles	70	September 30, 2011	Las Vegas, Nevada, U.S.	Natural causes
Bert Jansch; Pentangle	67	October 5, 2011	Hampstead, London, England	Lung cancer
Clara Jaione Famous singer and radio actress	84	October 6, 2011	Rome, Italy	
Mikey Welsh; Weezer	40	October 8, 2011	Chicago, Illinois, U.S.	Heart attack
Roger Williams (pianist)	87	October 8, 2011	Encinos, California, U.S.	Pancreatic cancer
Norman Durham; Kleeer	59	November 2, 2011	Chestnut Ridge, Hudson Valley, New York, U.S.	Carbon monoxide poisoning
Andrea True	68	November 7, 2011	Kingston, New York, New York, U.S.	Congestive heart failure
Heavy D Heavy D & the Boyz	44	November 8, 2011	Los Angeles, California, U.S.	Pulmonary embolism
Piero Trapani Singer, member of the vocal group Poker di Voci	81	November 19, 2011	Turin, Italy	
Lisa Fay Beatty; 7 Year Bitch	47	November 25, 2011	Mentone, California, U.S.	Traffic accident
Don DeVito; Record producer, music business and company executive from Columbia Records	72	November 25, 2011	The Bronx, New York, U.S.	Prostate cancer
Keef Hartley; Keef Hartley Band	67	November 26, 2011	Preston, Lancashire, England	
J. Blackfoot	65	November 30, 2011	Germantown, Tennessee, U.S.	Pancreatic cancer
Howard Tate	72	December 2, 2011	Burlington, New Jersey, U.S.	Multiple myeloma and leukaemia
Hubert Sumlin	80	December 4, 2011	Wayne, New Jersey, U.S.	Heart failure
Dobie Gray	71	December 6, 2011	Nashville, Tennessee, U.S.	Cancer
Jolanda Rossin Italian singer	71	December 10, 2011		
Tony Duran; Ruben and the Jets	66	December 16, 2011	Bruceville, Texas, U.S.	Prostate cancer
Cesária Évora Cape Verdean singer	70	December 17, 2011	Mindelo, Capo Verde	
Ralph MacDonald	67	December 18, 2011	Stamford, Connecticut, U.S.	Lung cancer
Sean Bonniwell; The Music Machine	71	December 20, 2011	Visalia, California, U.S.	Lung cancer
Dennis Wayne; Loosely Tight	57	December 20, 2011	Houston, Texas, U.S.	Diabetes
Jim Sherwood; The Mothers of Invention, Ruben and the Jets	69	December 25, 2011	Los Angeles, California, U.S.	Brain tumor
Sam Rivers	88	December 26, 2011	Orlando, Florida, U.S.	Pneumonia
Danny "Rio" DeGennaro; Kingfish	56	December 28, 2011	Levittown, Pennsylvania, U.S.	Shot

== See also ==
- List of murdered hip hop musicians
- 27 Club
