= The Road Leads Where It's Led =

EP by The Secret Machines
- Released: June 7, 2005
- Genre: New prog
- Length: 37:19
- Label: Reprise
- Producer: Secret Machines

The Secret Machines chronology
Now Here Is Nowhere (2004)	The Road Leads Where It's Led (2005)	Ten Silver Drops (2006)

Professional ratings
Review scores
Source	Rating
AllMusic	2.5/5 stars
Now Toronto	3/5 stars
Pitchfork Media	5.8/10
Pittsburgh Post-Gazette	3.5/5 stars

The Road Leads Where It's Led is The Secret Machines' second EP, released in 2005. In addition to the title-track, a single from their first album, Now Here Is Nowhere, the EP includes several cover versions, including Van Morrison's "Astral Weeks" and Bob Dylan's "Girl From the North Country," and a new song called "Better Bring Your Friends."

== Critical reception ==
Miami New Times called the covers "haunting," and also singled out "Immer Wieder" as a highlight.

== Track listing ==
1. "The Road Leads Where It's Led" – 4:01
2. "Better Bring Your Friends" – 3:09
3. "Astral Weeks" – 6:04
4. "Money (That's What I Want)" – 7:07
5. "Girl from the North Country" – 8:59
6. "(De Luxe) Immer Wieder" – 7:59

== Personnel ==
- Brandon Curtis – vocals, bass guitar, keyboard
- Benjamin Curtis – guitar, backing vocals
- Josh Garza – drums
