= Disconnect from Desire =

Studio album by School of Seven Bells
- Released: July 7, 2010
- Genre: Indie rock; dream pop; shoegaze; electronic
- Length: 50:11
- Label: Vagrant; Ghostly International
- Producer: Benjamin Curtis

School of Seven Bells chronology
Alpinisms (2008)	Disconnect from Desire (2010)	Ghostory (2012)

Singles from Disconnect from Desire
- 1. "Windstorm" Released: June 1, 2010; 2. "Heart Is Strange" Released: September 14, 2010; 3. "I L U" Released: December 5, 2010

Professional ratings
Aggregate scores
Source	Rating
Metacritic	69/100
Review scores
Source	Rating
AllMusic	4/5 stars
The A.V. Club	C
Clash	6/10
Consequence of Sound	4/5 stars
The Guardian	3/5 stars
Pitchfork Media	8.0/10
PopMatters	7/10 stars
Rolling Stone	3.5/5 stars
Slant Magazine	3/5 stars
Spin	7/10

Disconnect from Desire is the second studio album by American indie rock band School of Seven Bells, released on July 7, 2010 by Vagrant Records and Ghostly International. It debuted at number 200 on the Billboard 200. A deluxe limited edition of the album was released in a box set containing 10 exclusive tarot cards and a bonus disc of alternate versions of the band's debut album Alpinisms.

== Track listing ==
No.	Title	Length
1.	"Windstorm"	3:44
2.	"Heart Is Strange"	5:01
3.	"Dust Devil"	6:02
4.	"I L U"	4:40
5.	"Babelonia"	5:01
6.	"Joviann"	5:06
7.	"Camarilla"	4:52
8.	"Dial"	4:54
9.	"Bye Bye Bye"	4:15
10.	"The Wait"	6:36
Total length:		50:11

Japanese edition bonus tracks
No.	Title	Length
11.	"Crescent Gold"	4:22
12.	"Windstorm" (A Place to Bury Strangers Remix)	4:50
Total length:		59:23

Deluxe limited edition box set bonus disc: Alpinisms (alternate versions)
No.	Title	Length
1.	"Wired for Light" (Live Drum Version)	3:51
2.	"Half Asleep" (Alternate Version)	4:32
3.	"White Elephant Coat" (Early Demo Version)	3:53
4.	"Caldo" (Live on Stereogum's Decomposed)	3:00
5.	"Sempiternal/Amaranth" (Alternate Version)	11:14
6.	"Iamundernodisguise" (Vocal Mix 1)	3:38
7.	"My Cabal" (Early Mix 07)	3:49
8.	"Conjuur" (Alternate Version)	4:37
9.	"For Kalaja Mari" (Drum Outtake Mix)	4:21
Total length:		42:55

== Personnel ==
Credits adapted from the liner notes of Disconnect from Desire.

School of Seven Bells

- Benjamin Curtis – recording, guitar, production, percussion,
- Alejandra de la Deheza – lead vocals, guitar
- Claudia Deheza – backing vocals, synths

Additional personnel

- Bryan Collins – design
- Joe Corey – mixing assistance
- Tim DeLaughter – tubular bells (on "The Wait")
- Toby Halbrooks – additional percussion (on "The Wait")
- Mark Pirro – tubular bells recording (on "The Wait")
- Jack Joseph Puig – mixing
- Nolan Thies – additional percussion recording (on "The Wait")

== Charts ==
Chart (2010)	Peak position
UK Albums (OCC)	119
UK Independent Albums (OCC)	16
US Billboard 200	200
US Top Dance/Electronic Albums (Billboard)	9
US Independent Albums (Billboard)	29

== Release history ==
Region	Date	Label	Ref.
Japan	July 7, 2010	Plancha; Art Union	
Australia	July 9, 2010	Speak N Spell	
United Kingdom	July 12, 2010	Full Time Hobby	
United States	July 13, 2010	Vagrant; Ghostly International	
Germany	July 16, 2010	Full Time Hobby	
