= Secret Machines =

American alternative rock band

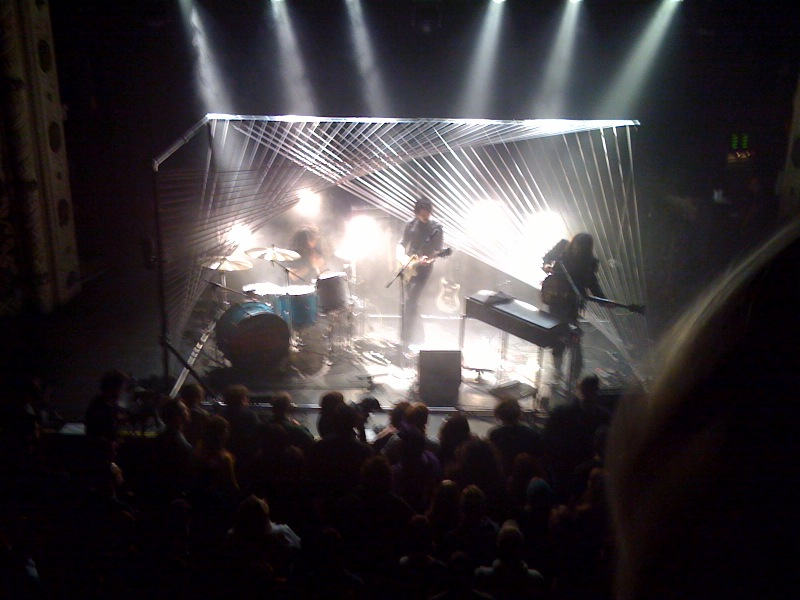
- Secret Machines, performing at Metro, on October 24, 2008. Left to right: Josh Garza, Phil Karnats, Brandon Curtis.

Background information
- Origin: Dallas, Texas, United States
- Genres: Alternative rock, space rock, new prog
- Years active: 2000–2010; 2020-present
- Label: Reprise
- Members: Brandon Curtis; Josh Garza; Phil Karnats
- Past members: Benjamin Curtis
- Website: thesecretmachinesofficial.com

Secret Machines are an American alternative rock band, originally from Dallas, Texas, before moving to New York City. The original lineup consisted of two brothers, Brandon (vocals, bass guitar and keyboards) and Benjamin Curtis (guitar and backing vocals), and Josh Garza (drums). Benjamin left the band in March 2007 to focus on his work with School of Seven Bells, and was replaced on guitar by Phil Karnats. The re-activated band is a two-piece, with the remaining members being Brandon Curtis and Josh Garza.

== History ==
=== Early years ===
Before forming Secret Machines, the members played in various Dallas bands such as UFOFU, Captain Audio, Comet, When Babies Eat Pennies, the Corn Cob Smokers, Jackie Wilson Apocalypse, the Flying Potatoes, Wigwam Truancy, the Brains of the Operation, Effluent Drinkers, the Bob Dole Conspiracy, Finally a Waiter, and Tripping Daisy. Captain Audio was formed by Garza and vocalist/guitarist/chief songwriter Regina Chellew in the late Nineties as a two-piece noise duo. Brandon—and occasionally Ben—Curtis joined soon after as the original duo began to develop a more standard rock sound. In a little over a year they had recorded and released the EP My Ears Are Ringing But My Heart's OK and the full-length Luxury Or Whether It Is Better To Be Loved Than Feared. Shortly after the release of Luxury the band went on extended hiatus and eventually disbanded when Garza and the Curtis brothers moved to New York, leaving Chellew in Dallas to form the band Chao and later join indie pop outfit the Happy Bullets.

=== September 000 and Now Here Is Nowhere ===
The band first recorded their EP September 000 in Chicago, six weeks after forming. Upon moving to New York the band further developed their sound and signed to Warner Brothers. In 2004, Secret Machines released their debut album, Now Here Is Nowhere. The song "Nowhere Again" was used in promotional spots during its launch and appeared in the 2006 video game Driver: Parallel Lines. Contemporary reviews for the album were favourable. The band's second EP, The Road Leads Where It's Led, was released on June 7, 2005. During this time, the band opened for Interpol during their 2004 tour before supporting Oasis in Europe in 2005 and co-headlining a US tour with Kings of Leon.

=== Marfa Mystery Lights: A concert for the UFO's ===
French director Charles De Meaux teamed up with the band for a film set in the Texas town of Marfa and included footage of the band recording new material and included an outdoor "concert" at night. The new "Marfa Song" was exclusively available in the film.

=== Ten Silver Drops and Ben's departure ===
In 2006, Ten Silver Drops, their second album, leaked onto file-sharing websites following the release of their lead single "Alone, Jealous and Stoned" in the UK. The album was critically-acclaimed by many publications. They embarked on a series of tours in support of the album, including opening for U2 for three dates in Mexico. Following the album's release, the band were interviewed for radio by David Bowie – a fan of the band.

On March 3, 2007, Benjamin Curtis announced his departure in order to focus full-time on his new band, School of Seven Bells. On December 29, 2013, Curtis died of lymphoma in New York City at age 35.

=== Third album and later years ===
After Ben's departure from the band, Secret Machines played two shows in New York, one at the Annex, and the other at the newly opened Highline Ballroom. At these shows, the band played mostly new material off of their next album. They included two new members: Blasco (Interpol's touring keyboardist) on guitar, keyboards, and bass, and ex-Tripping Daisy member Phil E. Karnats on guitar. Since these shows, Karnats has become the official guitarist of the band, replacing Ben.

The band finished recording quickly during May 2007 and released a new, self-titled album in the United States on October 14, 2008, on their newly formed TSM recording and distributed by Worlds Fair Records. Karnats announced on his MySpace blog that he recorded guitar parts for the album and would continue to play live with the band.

In 2010, a new single "Like I Can" along with "A terrible light" was released digitally, and Brandon announced plans for a new Secret Machines album, to be titled The Moth, The Lizard and The Secret Machines. While no official announcement was made, the band was inactive since 2010.

In 2016, Run Out Groove Records, a subsidiary of Warner Brothers, announced that fans had voted Now Here is Nowhere as the new label's third project for vinyl re-issue. This marked the first release of the title in the U.S. on vinyl, limited to 1,625 copies. On September 10, 2018, the label announced that the band's album Ten Silver Drops had been voted by fans as the next ROG re-release and would include a six-song bonus disc containing B-sides and unreleased alternate versions of songs. Subsequently, Run Out Groove announced the release of a double live album culled from a show on January 18, 2006 at the London nightclub The Garage.

=== Return to activity in 2020 ===
In January 2018 Brandon published on his twitter account a video of himself and drummer Josh Garza in the studio recording drums, leading to speculation of a return to activity for the band. On June 26 the band announced the availability of Awake in the Brain Chamber, to be released digitally and in a limited 500 copy vinyl release of August 21, 2020 via TSM Recordings. The band addressed the long period of inactivity and the rebirth of the band in press coverage of the release. A single, "Talos' Corpse", was released simultaneously. "Awake in the Brain Chamber" is performed by Brandon Curtis and Josh Garza, featuring musicians Benjamin Curtis, Chris Kyle, Brian Bisordi and Sarah Pedinotti (of Okkervil River and LipTalk). Songs were mixed by Claudius Mittendorfer and mastered by Joe Lambert. Original album artwork was by Danny Scales. In promotional interviews the band indicated the shelved album from 2010, "the Moth, The Lizard and the Secret Machines" would be released.

The Secret Machines released two companion EP's digitally and on cassette tape, Day 21 and dreaming of dreaming, in July 2022. Day 21 consisted of previously un-released material. Dreaming of Dreaming contains a re-mixed version of the 2008 EP as well as an alternate version recorded with Peter Mavrogeorgis on guitar and Jim Sclavunos contributing percussions.

In September it was announced that The Secret Machines would accompany Metric on the US leg of their Doomscroller tour with Phil Karnats re-joining on guitar for the tour.

== Style ==
Secret Machines has been described as progressive rock with some krautrock influences. They describe themselves as space rock. Many have also cited Secret Machines as a style of shoegaze.

The band described Ten Silver Drops as "being influenced by our love for Brian Eno and all things experimental, on the other hand was our love for The Beatles."

They have toured with U2, Foo Fighters, Spiritualized, Oasis, Interpol, M83, Kings of Leon, among others. Secret Machines supported the British rock trio Muse at London's Earls Court in December 2004. They appeared at Lollapalooza 2006 in Chicago and the Carling Reading and Leeds Festivals in England in the same year, as well as the Austin City Limits Music Festival in Texas. On September 7, 2022, Emily Haines of Metric announced that Secret Machines will be supporting Metric on the U.S. leg of their Doomscroller tour.

== Members ==
=== Current members ===
- Brandon Curtis – vocals, bass, keyboards
- Josh Garza – drums
- Phil Karnats – guitar (2007–2010, 2022–present)

=== Former members ===
- Benjamin Curtis – guitar, backing vocals (2000–2007; died 2013)

== Discography ==
=== Albums ===
- Now Here Is Nowhere (May 18, 2004) Reprise
- Ten Silver Drops (April 25, 2006) Reprise No. 43 UK, No. 159 US
- Secret Machines (October 14, 2008) World's Fair Label Group & TSM Recordings U.S. No. 12 Heatseekers
- Live at the Garage (limited edition vinyl only) (July 12, 2019) Reprise
- Awake in the Brain Chamber (August 21, 2020) TSM Recordings
- The Moth, the Lizard, and the Secret Machines (March 24, 2023) TSM Recordings

=== EPs ===
- September 000 (2002)
- The Road Leads Where It's Led (2005)
- Live At Austin City Limits Music Festival 2006 (iTunes Exclusive EP) (2006)
- Morning Becomes Eclectic (Live At KCRW) (2006)
- Dreaming of Dreaming (2008)
- Allaire Sessions (2019)
- Day 21 (2022)
- Dreaming of Dreaming (2022)

=== Singles ===
- "What Used To Be French (Revisit)" (7" vinyl only) (2003) UK
- "Nowhere Again" (2004) UK No. 49
- "Sad And Lonely" (2004) UK No. 38
- "The Road Leads Where It's Led" (2005) UK No. 56
- "Alone, Jealous & Stoned" (12" vinyl only) (2006) No. 93
- "Lightning Blue Eyes" (2006) UK No. 57
- "All At Once (It's Not Important)" (2006) UK No. 76
- "Dreaming of Dreaming" (2008)
- "Like I Can B/W Terrible Light" (2010)
- "Quisiera Ser Alcohol (Nos Vamos Juntos: Un Tributo a Caifanes y Jaguares)" (2010) Mexico

=== DVD ===
- Marfa Mystery Lights – The Secret Machines – A Concert for the UFO's [sic] (a performance conceived and filmed by Charles de Meaux) (2007), Les presses du réel

=== Soundtracks ===
The band contributed three tracks to the soundtrack for the 2007 film Across the Universe: a duet of "I Am the Walrus" with Bono on lead vocals, and the instrumentals "Flying", and "Blue Jay Way".
