= Comet (band) =

American indie rock band

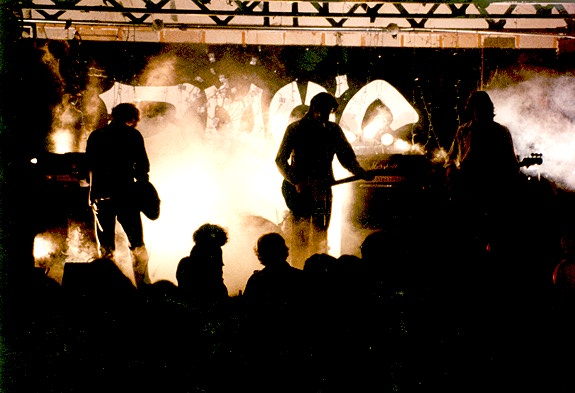
- Comet performing in Austin, Texas @ Emo's in 1996

Background information
- Origin: Dallas, Texas, United States
- Genres: Indie rock, shoegazing, dream pop
- Years active: 1993–1997; 2005–2006 (Hiatus)
- Labels: Dedicated Records, Last Beat, Atomic Sound, Spune
- Members: Jim Stone; Neil Stone; Michael Castillo
- Past members: Josh Garza; Daniel Huffman; J.D. Wittwer

Comet is an American indie rock band that was formed in 1993 in the Dallas, Texas suburb of Mesquite. Described as an enigmatic noise pop outfit brought together by a common love of the Beatles, the original lineup of singer/guitarist Jim Stone, his bassist-brother Neil Stone, guitarist Daniel Huffman, and percussionist Josh Garza entered the studio later that year to cut their debut single "Portrait," produced by Mercury Rev alum David Baker. A deal with the Arista subsidiary Dedicated label followed, they became label mates with Spiritualized, Beth Orton and the Cranes and with Baker again at the helm, Comet recorded their LP Chandelier Musings, issued in late 1996. The band toured throughout much of 1995 and 1996 and into early 1997 when fallout from a tour-van accident led to the eventual break up of the original line-up.

== Early history ==
PARK Sooyoung of Chicago-based band Seam was instrumental in connecting the band with their future producer David Baker. in 1994 Baker came to Texas and produced the band's first single Rocket Flare for Last Beat Records. Although the band was from suburban Dallas they made their home in Denton, TX and its underground music scene that centered on Denton's Melodica Festival. The band also opened regional shows for bands such as Bedhead, Tripping Daisy, Swirlies, Sixteen Deluxe and Mercury Rev.

Accompanied by Baker, the band opened an east coast tour with Duluth, MN band Low where the band played New York City for the first time gaining larger exposure that led to a deal with UK based Dedicated Records. In early 1996 the band recorded Chandelier Musings at OZ Studios in Baltimore, MD. Comet continued to tour with bands such as Acetone, Apples in Stereo and the Lilys making appearances at SXSW and CMJ. But fallout from an unfortunate tour-van accident on an icy interstate outside of Minneapolis, MN led ultimately to their breakup in 1997.

== Feathers from the Wing and hiatus ==
After a seven-year period of inactivity, brothers Jim and Neil Stone along with Michael Castillo on drums and J.D. Wittwer on bass assembled and released the lo-fi Feathers from the Wing EP on Spune Records in 2005. The band made a handful of appearances in and around Texas and then went on an indefinite hiatus in 2006.

== Discography ==
Albums

- Chandelier Musings (1997, Dedicated)

EPs and singles

- "Portrait" / "Rocket Flare" (1994, Last Beat)
- Comet EP (1995, Atomic Sound)
- Feathers from the Wing (2005, Spune)
