= Josh Garza =

American drummer

- Birth name: Joaquin Garza
- Born: May 13, 1976 (age 48); Dallas, TX.
- Genres: psych-rock, post punk, motorik, hard rock, progressive
- Years active: 1991-present
- Labels: Warner Bros. Records, Reprise, Worlds Fair, Narnack, Bodan Kuma

Josh Garza is an American musician and drummer for the New York City–based rock band The Secret Machines, as well as the Los Angeles–based rock band EFG. Originally from the Dallas, Texas area, Garza formed the Secret Machines with brothers Ben and Brandon Curtis, and EFG with guitarist and vocalist, Imaad Wasif, later joined by bassist and engineer, Tom Biller.^{[1]} He was part of the original lineup for the noise pop band COMET, and in the late 1990s, Captain Audio.^{[2]}

Josh Garza won the Esky Award for Best Drummer from Esquire Magazine in 2005 and was a featured artist in Modern Drummer Magazine in 2009 and again in 2011.

In 2010, Garza played a brief series of live shows with former Elefant frontman, Diego Garcia, performing at the Mercury Lounge and The Living Room in NYC as well as The Standard Hotel in Miami Beach. Later that year Garza laid drum tracks for former Monster Magnet, Hater and Wellwater Conspiracy guitarist, John McBain. He formed EFG, with Wasif in 2011, releasing their first EP in November of that year, and a second EP in the beginning of 2012. In April, of 2016 the trio released an untitled 7" vinyl single and announced a 6-song digital EP, "Thru The Future" out in September or 2016.

In early 2016 Garza sat in on several tracks with experimental psych-rockers The Warlocks, for their forthcoming album 'Songs from the Pale Eclipse'.

== Style ==
Garza cites John Bonham as an influence on his drumming style, though in a 2009 interview he explained his sound is still his own. "Of course, my drumming doesn’t sound exactly like Bonham—it sounds like Josh Garza—but it’s from that same school. One of my secret weapons is to dig deep, find the cannon sound, turn it up, and not be scared. I think that’s paid off for me."

His drumming serves as a staple element of the Secret Machines, and is responsible for the hard rock side of their music, complementing the spacy sounds of the Krautrock-influenced guitar and keyboards of the band.

Garza, who moved from New York to Los Angeles in 2010, is cited as an influence upon the drum sounds of other modern hard and alternative rock bands such as Kings Of Leon and Silver Sun Pickups.

== Discography ==
- EFG — Untitled 7" single (2016) Bodan Kuma Recordings
- EFG — EP lI (2012) Narnack Records
- EFG — EP l (2011) Narnack Records
- Secret Machines — Secret Machines (October 14, 2008) World's Fair Label Group & TSM Recordings U.S. No. 12 Heatseekers
- Secret Machines — Ten Silver Drops (April 25, 2006) Reprise No. 43 UK,^{[8]} No. 159 US^{[9]}
- Secret Machines — Live At Austin City Limits Music Festival 2006 (iTunes Exclusive EP, 2006)
- Secret Machines — Morning Becomes Eclectic (Live At KCRW) (EP, 2006)
- Secret Machines— The Road Leads Where It's Led (EP, 2005)
- Secret Machines — Now Here Is Nowhere (May 18, 2004) Reprise
- Secret Machines — September 000, EP (2002)
- Captain Audio — Luxury or Whether It Is Better To Be Loved Than Feared (2000) Last Beat Records
- Captain Audio — My Ears Are Ringing but My Heart's OK (1999) Last Beat Records
- COMET— Chandelier Musings (1997) Dedicated
- COMET—"Portrait" / "Rocket Flare" (1994) Last Beat
- COMET—Comet EP (1995) Atomic Sound

=== Soundtracks & Film ===
Along with the Secret Machines, Josh Garza has three tracks on the soundtrack for the 2007 film Across the Universe, which highlights the music of the Beatles, set to the story of a handful of characters living out the songs. They perform "I Am the Walrus" with Bono singing; an instrumental, "Flying", and "Blue Jay Way". Garza and the Secret Machines are also featured in the film, Marfa Mystery Lights – The Secret Machines – A Concert for the UFO's (A performance conceived and filmed by Charles de Meaux) (2007), Les presses du réel.
