= Brandon Curtis =

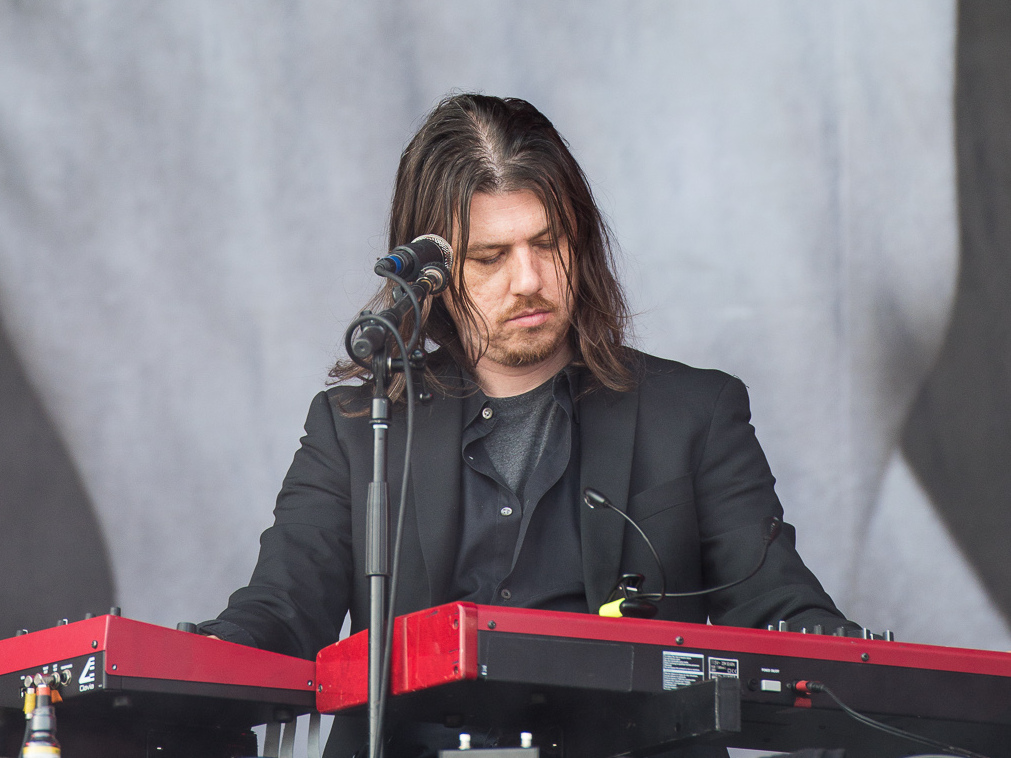
- Curtis performing with Interpol in 2015

Background information
- Genres: Alternative rock, space rock, indie rock, post-punk revival, new prog
- Instruments: Vocals, bass, keyboards, guitar
- Years active: 2000–present
- Labels: Matador; Riot House Records

Brandon Curtis is an American musician who is the vocalist, bassist, and keyboardist in the alternative rock band Secret Machines.

== Early life ==
Originally from Norman, Oklahoma, Curtis was friends with members of the Flaming Lips, the Chainsaw Kittens and Tripping Daisy. He and his brother Benjamin (1978-2013) moved to Dallas and formed Secret Machines in the early 2000s with drummer Josh Garza. The trio later moved to New York City, where Benjamin eventually left the band to pursue a career in his previous side project, School of Seven Bells. He has also been a live keyboardist for Interpol since 2010 and was named an official full-time member in 2026.

== Career ==
Curtis's atmospheric keyboard style shows signs of influence from 1970s Krautrock bands like Can as well as progressive rock, space rock and art rock bands such as Pink Floyd, Hawkwind, and Roxy Music.

Curtis and his brother Ben also formed UFOFU with Joseph Butcher, touring locally and recording several albums between 1993 and 1997. Curtis was in Captain Audio as well, where he first played with Secret Machines' drummer Josh Garza.

Curtis performed lead vocals on "Don't Fall Softly", a track by UK synthpop band Filthy Dukes which appears on their 2009 release "Nonsense In the Dark". He also mixed/produced two records by South African rock band BLK JKS.

In June 2010, Curtis joined the touring lineup of Interpol, on keyboards and vocals. In 2012, Brandon joined Interpol front man Paul Banks' live band, and he contributed to Banks' 2012 EP entitled "Julian Plenti Lives...".

Curtis contributed to the production, recording, and mixing of EmptyMansions debut album "snakes/vultures/sulfate", released in April 2013. EmptyMansions is the side project of Interpol drummer Sam Fogarino. Curtis toured with EmptyMansions in Spring 2013, on bass/vocals.

Curtis has produced three albums for the American post-metal band Russian Circles: Geneva (2009), Empros (2011) and Memorial (2013).

On October 30, 2013, Curtis's new band Cosmicide released a new song entitled "Talos' Corpse" and announced a few US tour dates. "Talos' Corpse" was written/produced by Brandon Curtis and mixed by Claudius Mittendorfer, who has previously worked with Paul Banks, Johnny Marr, the Kaiser Chiefs, and more.

Cosmicide played three live shows in early 2015 (Philadelphia, Providence RI and Teaneck NJ), playing a nine-song setlist, including Talos' Corpse, consisting mostly of songs from material that is recorded and in a finished state but unreleased. In addition to Brandon, the band consisted of drums, a second keyboardist, and a guitarist.

In August of 2020, Secret Machines released an album titled "Awake in the Brain Chamber". Curtis performed keyboard and vocals on the album.
