= Benjamin Curtis (musician) =

American guitarist

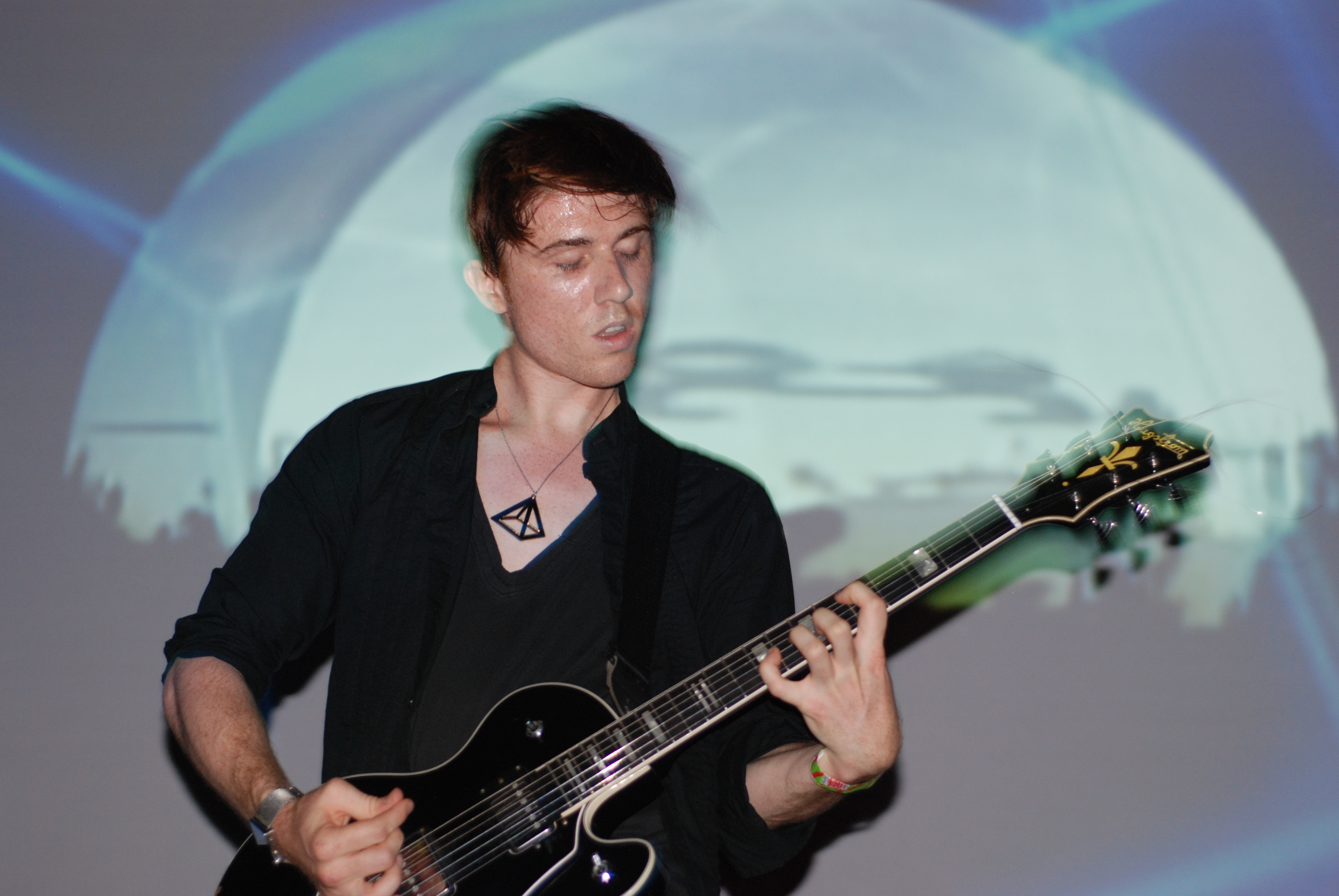
- Curtis performing at Bowery Ballroom in 2009

Background information
- Born: September 23, 1978
- Died: December 29, 2013 (aged 35) Sloan Kettering Cancer Center; New York City, New York, US
- Occupation: Musician
- Instruments: Guitar, Drums
- Years active: –2013
- Formerly of: School of Seven Bells

Benjamin Curtis (September 23, 1978 – December 29, 2013) was an American guitarist and drummer. He was a member of the bands Tripping Daisy, Secret Machines, and School of Seven Bells.

== History ==
Curtis cited guitarists such as Michael Rother, Yoshimi P-We, and the Edge of U2 as some of his primary influences on guitar. He played a heavily effects-laden spacy style of guitar, reminiscent of late 1960s and early 1970s psychedelic rock.

== Personal life ==
Curtis was in a relationship with his School of Seven Bells bandmate Alejandra Deheza from 2005 until 2010. The pair remained close friends and bandmates until Curtis' death. In the liner notes for School of Seven Bells' final album SVIIB, Deheza refers to Curtis as her "best friend and soulmate."

== Illness and death ==
Curtis announced in late February 2013 that he had been diagnosed with T-cell lymphoblastic lymphoma. A benefit concert was held in New York in August 2013 and included performances by members of the Strokes and Interpol. Curtis died on December 29, 2013, at Memorial Sloan Kettering Cancer Center in New York.
