= List of 2014 deaths in popular music =

This is a list of notable performers of rock music and other forms of popular music, and others directly associated with the music as producers, songwriters, or in other closely related roles, who died in 2014.

== 2014 deaths in popular music ==
| Preceded by 2013 | List of deaths in popular music 2014 | Succeeded by 2015 |

| Name | Age | Date | Location | Cause of death |
|---|---|---|---|---|
| Tabby Thomas | 84 | January 1, 2014 | Baton Rouge, Louisiana, U.S. | |
| Thomas Kurzhals; Stern-Combo Meißen, Karat | 60 | January 2, 2014 | Glauchau, Saxony, Germany | Liver cirrhosis |
| Jay Traynor; Jay and the Americans | 70 | January 2, 2014 | Tampa, Florida, U.S. | Liver cancer |
| Phil Everly; The Everly Brothers | 74 | January 3, 2014 | Burbank, California, U.S. | Lung disease |
| Nelson Ned | 66 | January 5, 2014 | Cotia, São Paulo, Brazil | Pneumonia |
| Maureen Gray | 65 | January 7, 2014 | Philadelphia, Pennsylvania, U.S. | Bile duct cancer |
| Arnoldo Foà Actor and voice actor but also active in music and singing | 97 | January 11, 2014 | Rome, Italy | Respiratory failure |
| Dennis Frederiksen; Toto, Angel | 62 | January 18, 2014 | Mound, Minnesota, U.S. | Cancer |
| Claudio Abbado Italian conductor | 80 | January 20, 2014 | Bologna, Italy | Following a long illness |
| Rusty York | 78 | January 26, 2014 | Redington Shores, Florida, U.S. | Degenerative brain disease |
| Pete Seeger | 94 | January 27, 2014 | Manhattan, New York City, U.S. | Natural causes |
| The Mighty Hannibal | 74 | January 30, 2014 | The Bronx, New York, U.S. | Respiratory failure |
| Anna Gordy Gaye | 92 | January 31, 2014 | Los Angeles, California, U.S. | |
| Bunny Rugs; Bunny & Ricky, Third World, Inner Circle | 65 | February 2, 2014 | Orlando, Florida, U.S. | Leukaemia |
| Roberto "Freak" Antoni Historic leader, founder, and vocalist of the group Skiantos | 59 | February 12, 2014 | Bologna, Italy | Long illness |
| Bob Casale; Devo | 61 | February 17, 2014 | Los Angeles, California, U.S. | Heart failure |
| Duffy Power | 72 | February 19, 2014 | London, England | |
| Francesco Di Giacomo Italian singer-songwriter, the lead signger of the group Banco del Mutuo Soccorso | 66 | February 21, 2014 | Zagarolo, Italy | A head-on car collision, believed to have been triggered by a sudden medical emergency (illness) while he was driving |
| Chip Damiani; The Remains | 68 | February 23, 2014 | Waterbury, Connecticut, U.S. | Brain hemorrhage |
| Franny Beecher; Bill Haley & His Comets | 92 | February 24, 2014 | Philadelphia, Pennsylvania, U.S. | Natural causes |
| Paco de Lucía | 66 | February 25, 2014 | Playa del Carmen, Quintana Roo, Mexico | Heart attack |
| Frank Reed; The Chi-Lites | 59 | February 26, 2014 | Chicago, Illinois, U.S. | Stroke |
| Frankie Sardo | 77 | February 26, 2014 | Somers, New York, U.S. | Cancer |
| Jerry Corbitt; The Youngbloods | 71 | March 8, 2014 | Smiley, Texas, U.S. | Lung cancer |
| Buren Fowler; Drivin' n' Cryin', R.E.M. | 54 | March 8, 2014 | Atlanta, Georgia, U.S. | |
| Michael Jagosz; L.A. Guns | 48 | March 9, 2014 | Los Angeles, California, U.S. | Valvular heart disease |
| Gary Burger; The Monks | 71 | March 14, 2014 | Turtle River, Minnesota, U.S. | Pancreatic cancer |
| Scott Asheton; The Stooges | 64 | March 15, 2014 | Ann Arbor, Michigan, U.S. | Heart attack |
| Joe Lala; Co-founder of the Blues Image | 66 | March 18, 2014 | Tampa, Florida, U.S. | Lung cancer |
| Dave Brockie; Gwar | 50 | March 23, 2014 | Richmond, Virginia, U.S. | Drug overdose. |
| Geoff Bradford | 80 | March 23, 2014 | Enfield, England | |
| Billy Mundi; The Paul Butterfield Blues Band | 71 | March 29, 2014 | North Hollywood, California, United States | Complications from diabetes |
| King Fleming | 91 | April 1, 2014 | Manteno, Illinois, U.S. | |
| Arthur "Guitar Boogie" Smith | 93 | April 3, 2014 | Charlotte, North Carolina, U.S. | |
| George Shuffler; The Stanley Brothers, The Bailey Brothers and the Happy Valley Boys | 88 | April 7, 2014 | Valdese, North Carolina, U.S. | |
| Jesse Winchester | 69 | April 11, 2014 | Charlottesville, Virginia, U.S. | Bladder Cancer |
| Little Joe Cook; Little Joe & The Thrillers | 91 | April 15, 2014 | Framingham, Massachusetts, U.S. | Cancer |
| Shane Gibson; Korn | 35 | April 15, 2014 | Birmingham, Alabama, U.S. | Blood clotting disorder |
| Deon Jackson | 68 | April 18, 2014 | Arlington Heights, Illinois, U.S. | Brain hemorrhage |
| DJ Rashad | 34 | April 26, 2014 | Chicago, Illinois, U.S. | Multiple drug overdose |
| DJ E-Z Rock; Rob Base and DJ E-Z Rock | 46 | April 27, 2014 | Manhattan, New York City, U.S. | Diabetic seizure |
| Cindy Boettcher; Vixen | 60 | April 28, 2014 | Minnesota, U.S. | |
| Larry Ramos; The Association | 72 | April 30, 2014 | Clarkston, Washington, U.S. | Heart attack |
| Jessica Cleaves; The Friends of Distinction, Earth, Wind & Fire | 65 | May 2, 2014 | Los Angeles, California, U.S. | Stroke |
| Bobby Gregg | 78 | May 3, 2014 | Las Vegas, Nevada, U.S. | |
| Joe Wilder | 92 | May 9, 2014 | New York City, U.S. | |
| Nash the Slash | 66 | May 10, 2014 | Toronto, Ontario, Canada | Heart attack |
| Ed Gagliardi; Foreigner, Spys | 62 | May 11, 2014 | New York City, New York, U.S. | Cancer |
| Dave Mills; British singer | 78 | May 14, 2014 | Perth, Australia | |
| Ernie Chataway; Judas Priest | 62 | May 14, 2014 | England | Lung cancer |
| Jerry Vale | 83 | May 18, 2014 | Palm Desert, California, U.S. | Natural causes |
| Massimo Castellina Italian accordionist and singer, known as the lead accordionist in the Orchestra Castellina | 43 | May 18, 2014 | Asti, Italy | |
| Doc Neeson; The Angels, Red Phoenix | 67 | June 4, 2014 | Sydney, Australia | Brain tumor |
| Alan Douglas; Record producer | 82 | June 7, 2014 | Paris, France | Complications after a fall |
| Jim Keays | 67 | June 13, 2014 | Melbourne, Victoria, Australia | |
| Casey Kasem; Host of Casey's Top 40, Casey's Top 20 & Casey's Countdown | 82 | June 15, 2014 | Gig Harbor, Washington, U.S. | Sepsis |
| Jimmy Scott | 88 | June 12, 2014 | Las Vegas, Nevada, U.S. | Cardiac arrest |
| Horace Silver | 85 | June 18, 2014 | New Rochelle, New York, U.S. | Alzheimer's disease |
| Gerry Goffin | 75 | June 19, 2014 | Los Angeles, California, U.S. | |
| Teenie Hodges; Hi Rhythm Section | 68 | June 22, 2014 | Dallas, Texas, U.S. | Complications of emphysema |
| Bobby Womack; The Valentinos | 70 | June 27, 2014 | Cleveland, Ohio, U.S. | Multiple diseases |
| Paul Horn | 84 | June 29, 2014 | Vancouver, British Columbia, Canada | Unspecified brief illness |
| Giorgio Faletti Italian writer, actor and singer-songwriter (famous for the song "Signor Tenente") | 63 | July 4, 2014 | Turin, Italy | |
| Lois Johnson | 72 | July 7, 2014 | Nashville, Tennessee, U.S. | |
| John Spinks; The Outfield | 60 | July 9, 2014 | Kent, England | Liver cancer |
| Charlie Haden | 76 | July 11, 2014 | Los Angeles, California, U.S. | complications from liver disease |
| Tommy Ramone; The Ramones | 65 | July 11, 2014 | New York City, New York, U.S. | Bile duct cancer |
| Vange Leonel; Nau | 51 | July 14, 2014 | São Paulo, Brazil | Ovarian cancer |
| Johnny Winter | 70 | July 16, 2014 | Zürich, Switzerland | Emphysemia and pneumonia |
| Ernie Lancaster | 60 | July 17, 2014 | Mount Dora, Florida, U.S. | Cancer |
| James Govan | 64 | July 18, 2014 | Memphis, Tennessee, United States | |
| Christian Falk; Imperiet | 52 | July 23, 2014 | Stockholm, Sweden | Pancreatic cancer |
| Adolph Jacobs; The Coasters | 74 | July 23, 2014 | U.S. | |
| Johnny Rebb | 75 | July 28, 2014 | Newcastle, New South Wales, Australia | |
| Idris Muhammad | 74 | July 29, 2014 | Fort Lauderdale, Florida, U.S. | Kidney failure |
| Dick Wagner; Alice Cooper, The Frost | 71 | July 30, 2014 | Phoenix, Arizona, U.S. | Respiratory failure |
| Wilma Roy Singer active between the 1960s and 1970s | 71 | July 31, 2014 | Milan, Italy | |
| Michael Johns | 35 | August 1, 2014 | Tustin, California, U.S. | Dilated cardiomyopathy |
| Rosetta Hightower; The Orlons | 70 | August 2, 2014 | Clapham, London, England | Brain hemorrhage |
| Lynwood Slim | 60 | August 4, 2014 | Fullerton, California, U.S. | Complications from stroke |
| Velva Darnell | 75 | August 12, 2014 | Hudson, Florida, U.S. | |
| Buddy Jones | 77 | August 13, 2014 | Barton, Vermont, U.S. | Complications from dementia |
| Rick Parashar; Record producer for Temple of the Dog, Nickelback, Alice in Chains, Litfiba, Pearl Jam | 50 | August 20, 2014 | Queen Anne, Washington, U.S. | Natural causes |
| Jean Redpath | 77 | August 21, 2014 | Arizona, U.S. | Cancer |
| Aldo Donati Italian singer-songwriter, actor and television personality | 66 | August 24, 2014 | Rome, Italy | |
| Joe Bethancourt | 68 | August 28, 2014 | Phoenix, Arizona, U.S. | |
| Glenn Cornick; Jethro Tull | 67 | August 28, 2014 | Hilo, Hawaii, U.S. | Heart failure |
| Jimi Jamison; Survivor | 63 | August 31, 2014 | Memphis, Tennessee, U.S. | Cardiovascular disease |
| Gustavo Cerati; Soda Stereo | 55 | September 4, 2014 | Buenos Aires, Argentina | Respiratory arrest after a stroke |
| Simone Battle; G.R.L. | 25 | September 5, 2014 | Los Angeles, California, U.S. | Suicide by hanging |
| Kerrie Biddell | 67 | September 5, 2014 | Sydney,Australia | Stroke |
| RiSe; Ladies' Code | 23 | September 7, 2014 | Suwon, South Korea | Traffic accident |
| Gerald Wilson | 96 | September 8, 2014 | Los Angeles, California, U.S. | Pneumonia |
| Robert Young; Primal Scream | 49 | September 9, 2014 | Hove, England | |
| John Gustafson; Ian Gillan Band, Roxy Music | 72 | September 12, 2014 | Whitstable, Kent, England | Heart failure or Cancer |
| Joe Sample; The Crusaders | 75 | September 12, 2014 | Houston, Texas, U.S. | Lung cancer |
| Peter Gutteridge | 53 | September 15, 2014 | Auckland, New Zealand | |
| George Hamilton IV | 77 | September 17, 2014 | Nashville, Tennessee, U.S. | Complications from a heart attack |
| Kenny Wheeler | 84 | September 18, 2014 | London, England | Natural causes |
| U. Srinivas; Remember Shakti | 45 | September 19, 2014 | Chennai, Tamil Nadu, India | Liver transplant complications |
| Paul Revere; Paul Revere & the Raiders | 76 | October 4, 2014 | San Francisco, California, U.S. | Cancer |
| Mark Bell; LFO | 43 | October 8, 2014 | Wakefield, West Yorkshire, England | |
| Sista Monica Parker | 58 | October 9, 2014 | Modesto, California, U.S. | Lung cancer |
| Isaiah "Ikey" Owens; The Mars Volta, Free Moral Agents | 39 | October 14, 2014 | Cholula, Puebla, Mexico | Heart attack |
| Tim Hauser; The Manhattan Transfer | 72 | October 16, 2014 | Sayre, Pennsylvania, U.S. | Cardiac arrest |
| Sergio Zampetti Musician | 43 | October 16, 2014 | Saronno, Italy | Long illness |
| Paul Craft | 76 | October 18, 2014 | Nashville, Tennessee, U.S. | Multiple diseases |
| Jeanne Black | 76 | October 25, 2014 | Orem, Utah, U.S. | Heart failure |
| Alvin Stardust | 72 | October 25, 2014 | Ifold, West Sussex, England | Prostate cancer |
| Jack Bruce; Cream | 71 | October 25, 2014 | Suffolk, England | Liver disease |
| Shin Hae-chul | 46 | October 27, 2014 | Seoul, South Korea | Medical accident |
| Wayne Static; Static-X | 48 | November 1, 2014 | Landers, California, U.S. | Drug and alcohol overdose |
| Acker Bilk | 85 | November 2, 2014 | Bath, Somerset, England | |
| Michael Coleman | 58 | November 2, 2014 | Chicago,Illinois, United States | Heart failure |
| Augusto Martelli Italian composer | 74 | November 3, 2014 | Milan, Italy | Long illness |
| Rick Rosas | 65 | November 6, 2014 | Los Angeles, California, U.S. | Lung disease |
| Big Bank Hank; The Sugarhill Gang | 58 | November 11, 2014 | New York City, New York, U.S. | Cancer |
| Buddy Catlett | 81 | November 12, 2014 | Seattle, Washington, U.S. | Multiple diseases |
| Mike Burney; Wizzard | 70 | November 13, 2014 | Birmingham, England | Cancer |
| Glen A. Larson; The Four Preps | 77 | November 14, 2014 | Santa Monica, California, U.S. | Esophageal cancer |
| Jimmy Ruffin | 78 | November 17, 2014 | Las Vegas, Nevada, U.S. | |
| Dave Appell | 92 | November 18, 2014 | U.S. | |
| Joe Bonner | 66 | November 21, 2014 | Denver, Colorado, U.S. | Heart disease |
| Clive Palmer; The Incredible String Band | 71 | November 23, 2014 | Penzance, England | |
| Jon Ster; Lillian Axe | 52 | November 29, 2014 | Dallas, Texas, U.S. | Heart failure |
| Bobby Keys; The Rolling Stones | 70 | December 2, 2014 | Franklin, Tennessee, U.S. | Cirrhosis |
| Ian McLagan; Small Faces, Faces | 69 | December 3, 2014 | Austin, Texas, U.S. | Stroke |
| Bob Montgomery | 77 | December 4, 2014 | Lee's Summit, Missouri, U.S. | Parkinson's disease |
| Brian Roy Goble; Subhumans | 57 | December 7, 2014 | Vancouver, British Columbia, Canada | Heart attack |
| Mango Italian singer-songwriter | 60 | December 8, 2014 | Policoro, Italy | Heart attack while performing his song "Oro" on stage |
| Dawn Sears | 53 | December 11, 2014 | Gallatin, Tennessee, U.S. | Lung cancer |
| Joe Carr; Joe Carr & the Texas Lone Star Band | 63 | December 14, 2014 | Levelland, Texas, U.S. | Stroke |
| Millie Kirkham | 91 | December 14, 2014 | Nashville, Tennessee, U.S. | Complications after stroke |
| Wendy Rene | 67 | December 16, 2014 | Memphis,Tennessee,U.S. | Complications after stroke |
| John Fry; Record producer | 69 | December 18, 2014 | Memphis, Tennessee, U.S. | Cardiac arrest |
| Larry Henley; The Newbeats | 77 | December 18, 2014 | Nashville, Tennessee, U.S. | Dementia with Lewy bodies |
| Larry Smith; Record producer | 62 | December 19, 2014 | New York City, New York, U.S. | |
| Joe Cocker; The Grease Band | 70 | December 22, 2014 | Crawford, Colorado, U.S. | Lung cancer |
| Udo Jürgens | 80 | December 21, 2014 | Münsterlingen, Switzerland | |
| Alberta Adams | 97 | December 25, 2014 | Dearborn, Michigan, U.S. | |
| Frankie Randall | 76 | December 28, 2014 | Indio, California, U.S. | Lung cancer |
| Adolfas Jarulis; Lithuanian Pop singer and member of Trimitas, Žėrutis, Nemuno Žiburiai | 73 | December 29, 2014 | Vilnius, Lithuania | |

== See also ==
- List of murdered hip hop musicians
- 27 Club
