= Monk Time =

Single by Alec Empire and Gary Burger; The Fall

from the album Silver Monk Time
- A-side: "Monk Time by Alec Empire and Gary Burger
- B-side: "Higgle-dy Piggle-dy" by The Fall
- Released: October 2006
- Recorded: 2006
- Length: 6:00
- Label: Play Loud! Productions
- Songwriters: Alec Empire, Gary Burger

The Monks tribute singles chronology
""Monk Time" b/w "Higgle-dy Piggle-Dy" by Alec Empire & Gary Burger / The Fall"	""Drunken Maria" b/w "Monk Chant" by Gossip / The Raincoats"

"Monk Time" was taken from the tribute album Silver Monk Time. The single as well as the tribute record were produced in support of the documentary film Monks: The Transatlantic Feedback. Play Loud! Productions brought together long time Monks fan Alec Empire and the original Monks singer Gary Burger to collaborate on an updated version of the classic "Monk Time". In the late 80s and mid 90s several different Monks songs had been covered by the British band The Fall. When asked to contribute a new Monks tune the band decided to do their version of "Higgle-dy Piggle-dy" which features as the B-side of this single. The record's art work is part of a drawing by German painter Daniel Richter. In 2009 a second single has been taken from Silver Monk Time: "Drunken Maria" by Gossip b/w "Monk Chant" by The Raincoats.

== Track list ==
Side 1

1. "Monk Time" (Alec Empire / Gary Burger)

Side 2

1. "Higgle-dy Piggle-dy" (The Fall)
