= Black Monk Time =

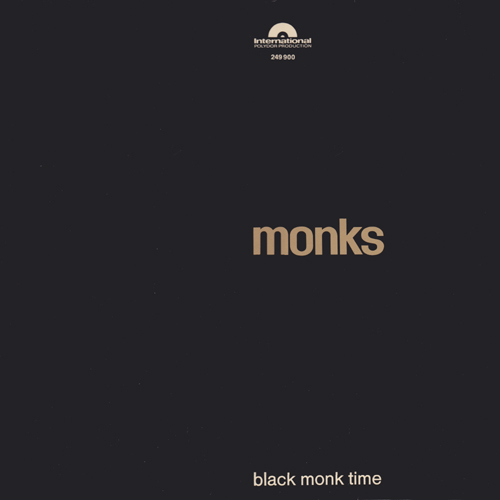

Studio album by Monks
- Released: March 1966
- Recorded: November 1965 in Cologne, West Germany
- Genres: Garage rock; beat; proto-punk
- Length: 29:48
- Label: Polydor
- Producer: Jimmy Bowien

Monks chronology
Black Monk Time (1966)	Five Upstart Americans (1999)

Singles from Black Monk Time
- 1. "Complication" / "Oh, How to Do Now" Released: May 1965

Black Monk Time is the only studio album by the German-based American garage rock band the Monks, released in March 1966 through Polydor Records. It was later recognized by music critics as a forerunner to punk rock.

Black Monk Time was ranked number 56 on Spin magazine's list of the "Top 100 Alternative Albums of the 1960s" and number 127 on Pitchfork's list of the best albums of the 1960s, and has been featured on The Word's "Hidden Treasure: Great Underrated Albums of Our Time", as well as the Sunday Herald's "The 103 Best Albums Ever, Honest" and the book 1001 Albums You Must Hear Before You Die.

== Background ==
Formed by five American GIs stationed in Gelnhausen, West Germany, in 1964, the Monks, originally known as the Torquays, were signed by a German management team composed of Karl Remy, Walther Niemann, and Günther and Kiki Aulich, who originally spotted the band at a show in Stuttgart. Bassist Eddie Shaw stated: "We were getting our haircuts when Roger [Johnston] decided to have a tonsure. That's when we all decided to do it. Our manager Karl said, 'That's it!'" The other members were initially wary of this look, but they all eventually adopted tonsures, black religious habits, and cinctures and renamed themselves "the Monks", with local newspapers labeling them "the anti-beatles". The group also altered their sound significantly, incorporating feedback, an electric banjo guitar, drums with no cymbals, fuzz bass, anti-war lyrics, and a general emphasis on rhythm.

Black Monk Time was recorded in November 1965 in Cologne, with Jimmy Bowien producing, and released by Polydor Records in March 1966. "Complication" b/w "Oh, How to Do Now" was released as a single to promote the album, but neither release garnered commercial success.

== Music ==
According to Stephen M. Deusner of Paste, "The Monks were all rhythm section, with every instrument clicking into a tense lockstep punctuated by Gary Burger’s wild-man yelps and Dave Day's electrified banjo—an instrument as distinct as the Thirteenth Floor Elevators’ electric jug. In their lusty frivolity, The Monks find a measure of gravity and outrage." Their style was self-described as "Über-beat". In 2011, bassist Eddie Shaw described their musical process in an interview:

To develop something new we developed a process known as deconstructing and reconstructing, laying down bass and drum patterns to be added to, by the other instruments. We made best use of each individual’s tendencies and abilities. In fact we made it very minimalist – single loud/distorted bass notes on the beat – drums with no cymbals except for accents – banjo rock and roll chords because it was a hard trashy sound – guitar, using the feedback – and organ playing beats and wild solos. All instruments were played as rhythm instruments.

Critic Alexis Petridis of The Guardian cited Roger Johnston's drumming on the album as a precursor to the later German krautrock movement, noting an early form of the motorik beat in his "tightly wound playing".

== Critical reception ==
Professional ratings
Review scores
Source	Rating
Allmusic	4.5/5 stars
Robert Christgau	(1-star Honorable Mention)
The Observer	4/5 stars
Paste	favorable
Pitchfork Media	9.2/10
Prefix	9.0/10
The Quietus	very favorable
Spin	favorable
The Daily Telegraph	5/5 stars

Black Monk Time was initially ignored upon release but has since become widely recognized as a landmark proto-punk album. In a retrospective review for About.com, Anthony Carew called it "possibly the first punk record" and "one of the 'missing links' of alternative music history", also citing it as an influence on the German krautrock movement. Andrew Perry wrote in The Daily Telegraph in 2009: "it's hard to imagine how this primitive and often nightmarish music could have been allowed to be made at that particular time and place. [...] It may not be to every taste but, lurching according to its own sublimely clueless logic, it has a purity and heedlessness which can never be repeated." According to Len Comaratta of Uncut, "there's really nothing that can dull the impact of hearing the Monks' music for the first time." Paste magazine described the album as "[eleven] songs of brash grooves and unearthly garage rock that show no signs of hobby or pastime." In his book, The Rough Guide to Rock, writer Peter Buckley had said Black Monk Time has not "aged one iota. If anything, it has gotten stranger".

Music historian Kelley Stoltz described the Monks as a group that "overwhelms the listener with a sound they termed 'over-beat' - at their worst it is totally oddball freakrock that sounds like a pleasurable argument". Stoltz concluded that the band had "outsexed the [Sex] Pistols" ten years before punk emerged.

Julian Cope of the Teardrop Explodes described the album as a "lost classic" in his 1995 book Krautrocksampler, stating: "NO-ONE ever came up with a whole album of such dementia. The Monks' Black Monk Time is a gem born of isolation and the horrible deep-down knowledge that no-one is really listening to what you're saying. And the Monks took full artistic advantage of their lucky/unlucky position as American rockers in a country that was desperate for the real thing. They wrote songs that would have been horribly mutilated by arrangers and producers had they been back in America. But there was no need for them to clean up their act, as the Beatles and others had had to do on returning home, for there were no artistic constraints in a country that liked the sound of beat music but had no idea about its lyric content".

== Legacy ==
In 2009, Light in the Attic released a reissue of Black Monk Time, which featured appraising quotes by several musicians. Artists such as Jello Biafra of Dead Kennedys, Jay Reatard, Fred Cole of Dead Moon, Casey Wescott of Fleet Foxes, Jared Swilley of Black Lips, Mark E. Smith of the Fall, Lenny Kaye of the Patti Smith Group, Krist Novoselic of Nirvana, Ira Kaplan of Yo La Tengo, Jack White of the White Stripes, Jon Spencer of the Jon Spencer Blues Explosion, Ade Blackburn of Clinic, Jochen Immler of Faust, Iggy Pop of the Stooges, and the Beastie Boys were featured in the liner notes as fans of the record.

A tribute album, titled Silver Monk Time, containing tracks by numerous bands, was released in October 2006 as the soundtrack to the award-winning documentary Monks: The Transatlantic Feedback. Artists featured on the album included the Raincoats, the Fall, Silver Apples, Faust, Jon Spencer, and Alan Vega of Suicide.

Black Monk Time was not officially released in the United States until 1994, as Polydor Records had deemed the music too experimental for an American audience and too blunt in its condemnation of the Vietnam War. The band's debut single was reissued in 2009 by Play Loud! Productions.

== In popular culture ==
English post-punk band the Fall covered three of the album's songs: "I Hate You" and "Oh, How to Do Now" (as "Black Monk Theme Part I" and "Black Monk Theme Part II") on their 1990 album Extricate and "Shut Up" on their 1994 album Middle Class Revolt.

In 1997, Henry Rollins and Rick Rubin released the first American reissue of Black Monk Time on their "Infinite Zero" record label.

"I Hate You" is featured in the 1998 film The Big Lebowski. In 2000, Powerade featured "Monk Time" in an advertisement. In 2017, Apple featured "Boys Are Boys and Girls Are Choice" in a commercial for the iPhone 7; that same year, the film Logan Lucky featured "We Do Wie Du".

== Track listing ==
All tracks are written by Gary Burger, Larry Clark, Dave Day, Roger Johnston and Eddie Shaw.

Side A
No.	Title	Length
1.	"Monk Time"	2:42
2.	"Shut Up"	3:11
3.	"Boys Are Boys and Girls Are Choice"	1:23
4.	"Higgle-Dy-Piggle-Dy"	2:28
5.	"I Hate You"	3:32
6.	"Oh, How to Do Now"	3:14

Side B
No.	Title	Length
1.	"Complication"	2:21
2.	"We Do Wie Du"	2:09
3.	"Drunken Maria"	1:44
4.	"Love Came Tumblin' Down"	2:28
5.	"Blast Off!"	2:12
6.	"That's My Girl"	2:24

1994 Repertoire Records reissue bonus tracks
No.	Title	Length
13.	"I Can't Get Over You"	2:41
14.	"Cuckoo"	2:42
15.	"Love Can Tame the Wild"	2:38
16.	"He Went Down to the Sea"	3:03

1997 Infinite Zero Archive/American Recordings reissue bonus tracks
No.	Title	Length
13.	"I Can't Get Over You"	2:41
14.	"Cuckoo"	2:42
15.	"Love Can Tame the Wild"	2:38
16.	"He Went Down to the Sea"	3:03
17.	"Monk Chant" (Live on Beat Club, 1966)	1:59
18.	"I Hate You" (Demo version)	3:24
19.	"Oh, How to Do Now" (Demo version)	2:39

2004 Retribution Records reissue bonus tracks
No.	Title	Length
13.	"I Can't Get Over You"	2:41
14.	"Cuckoo"	2:42
15.	"Monk Chant" (Live on Beat-Club, 1966)	1:59

2009 Light in the Attic Records reissue bonus tracks
No.	Title	Length
13.	"I Can't Get Over You"	2:41
14.	"Cuckoo"	2:42
15.	"Love Can Tame the Wild"	2:38
16.	"He Went Down to the Sea"	3:03
17.	"Pretty Suzanne" (previously unreleased)	3:55
18.	"Monk Chant" (Live on Beat-Club, 1966)	1:59

2011 International Polydor Production reissue bonus tracks
No.	Title	Length
13.	"I Can't Get Over You"	2:41
14.	"Cuckoo"	2:42
15.	"Love Can Tame the Wild"	2:38
16.	"He Went Down to the Sea"	3:03

== Personnel ==
- Gary Burger – vocals, electric lead guitar
- Larry Clark – vocals, Philicorda organ, piano (bonus tracks only)
- Roger Johnston – vocals, drums
- Eddie Shaw – vocals, bass guitar, trumpet (bonus tracks only)
- Dave Day – vocals, banjo guitar, electric rhythm guitar (bonus tracks only)

== Release history ==
Region	Date	Title	Label	Format	Catalog
Germany	May 1966	Black Monk Time	International Polydor Production	Stereo LP	249 900
Germany	1979	Black Monk Time	Polydor	Stereo LP	2417 129
Germany	January 19, 1994	Black Monk Time	Repertoire Records	CD	REP 4438-WP
USA	February 11, 1997	Black Monk Time^{[a]}	Infinite Zero	CD	9 43112-2
USA	October 12, 2004	Monk Time	Retribution Records	CD	105523
Germany	March 13, 2009	Black Monk Time^{[a]}	Polydor	LP/CD	1785 208 [LP], 177 1723 [CD]
USA	April 14, 2009	Black Monk Time^{[a]}	Light in the Attic Records	LP/CD	LITA 042
USA	2011	Black Time	International Polydor Production	LP	249900
Japan	December 29, 2018	Black Monk Time	Oldays Records	CD	ODR6750
Spain	2025	Black Monk Time	Munster Records	LP	MR 486

^aThis release includes extensive liner notes, including interviews and photographs
