= Higgledy piggledy =

Higgledy piggledy may refer to:

- HiggledyPiggledy, 2018 album by Slug
- Higgle-dy piggle-dy, side 2 of record Monk Time
- Higgledy-Piggledy, a Joe Weber and Florenz Ziegfeld Jr. burlesque
- double dactyl, a verse form invented by Anthony Hecht, and Paul Pascal in 1951.
