= Silver Monk Time =

Silver Monk Time A Tribute to the Monks

Soundtrack album by Various
- Released: October 2006
- Recorded: between September 2005 and May 2006
- Genre: Rock; Protopunk; Experimental rock Avant-garde; Art rock Krautrock; Techno; Electronic
- Length: 107:00
- Label: Play Loud! Productions
- Producer: Dietmar Post & Lucia Palacios

Singles from Silver Monk Time
- 1. "Monk Time" b/w "Higgle-dy Piggle-Dy" Released: 2006; 2. "Drunken Maria" b/w "Monk Chant" Released: 2009

Silver Monk Time is a tribute album inspired by the German-American beat band the Monks. It also serves as the soundtrack to Monks: The Transatlantic Feedback, a 2006 documentary film about the band. The record was produced and compiled by the filmmakers, Dietmar Post and Lucia Palacios, and released in October 2006 on the Play Loud! Productions label.

The official record release was part of a major event at Volksbühne theater in Berlin, Germany. In conjunction with the film's premiere, the Monks performed their first live show in Germany for almost 40 years. They were joined on stage by some of the musicians featured on the album, including The Raincoats, Mark E. Smith of The Fall, Peter Hein of Fehlfarben, and Schorsch Kamerun of Goldene Zitronen.

== Concept ==
The production of Monks: The Transatlantic Feedback was hampered by financial problems. The creation of Silver Monk Time was in part an attempt to raise money for the film. The title came about due to a rumor that after the release of Black Monk Time in May 1966, the Monks had begun work on a second LP, called Silver Monk Time, which would have consisted entirely of one long "primitive beat", involving tambourines, an organ, and guitar feedback.

It was decided that the new Silver Monk Time would not be a standard tribute album; the participating artists were explicitly asked to experiment with the songs, rather than producing straight cover versions. The German electronic avant-garde band Mouse on Mars wrote, in the booklet accompanying the record: "Mouse on Mars have tried to prove that after the deconstruction of the Monks their undeniable influence on 21st-century pop music has been proven. Rhythm, sound and melody grow together to a stream of lava on which the energy laden music surfs down into the valley of Dionysus by tearing down mirror balls like apples from trees."

The album artwork was created by Lucia Palacios, and is based on the motif of the Monks: The Transatlantic Feedback film poster by Daniel Richter.

== Reception ==
The Village Voice wrote: "The Uberbeat (and a war or two) goes on. (...) Silver Monk Time buys us all some more hop time, finally!“

The Wire mentioned Silver Monk Time among the best compilation records of 2007: "Unlike many tribute projects that fall flat due to those involved being either overawed or ignorant of the original material, Silver Monk Time succeeds because the participants have taken the group's primitive rock surge as a template to experiment with. As a result the sound of The Monks is treated to a 21st century workout with synthesizers and beat tracks threaded through the original quartet's already way out psychotic minimalism“.

== Track listing ==
CD 1

1. Minimal Monk (Mense Reents)
2. Monk Time (Alec Empire / Gary Burger)
3. Monks No Time (Mouse on Mars)
4. Monk Chant (The Raincoats)
5. Were Ever / Oh, How to Do Now (27 / 11)
6. Monk Hop (Jason Forrest)
7. Blast Off (Cycle)
8. We Do Wie Do (Fehlfarben)
9. Drunken Maria (The Gossip)
10. Complication (Jon Spencer / Solex)
11. Silver Monk Time (Silver Apples / Alan Vega)
12. Shut Up (Floating di Morel)
13. Tumbling Monks (Gudrun Gut)
14. Kuchhuche (Nista Nije Nista)

CD 2

1. The Transatlantic Feedback (F.S.K.)
2. Higgle-Dy Piggle-Dy (The Fall / Gary Burger)
3. Komplikation (Die Goldenen Zitronen / Chicks on Speed)
4. I Can't Get Over You (Barbara Manning / The Go-Luckys)
5. Boys Are Girls and Girls Are Boys (Psychic TV)
6. Sei Still (Doc Schoko)
7. Oh, How To Do Now (S.Y.P.H.)
8. I Hate You (Alexander Hacke)
9. Shut Up (The (International) Noise Conspiracy)
10. Cuckoo (The 5.6.7.8's)
11. That's My Girl (The Havletones / Dave Day)
12. I Hate You (Singapore Sling)
13. Blaster (Michaela Melian)
14. It Is Charles Time (Charles Paul Wilp / The Monks)
15. Beware - The Transatlantic Feedback (Faust / Gary Burger)

== Singles ==
There have also been two 7" single releases taken from Silver Monk Time:

1. "Monk Time" (Alec Empire / Gary Burger) b/w "Higgle-dy Piggle-dy" (The Fall)
2. "Drunken Maria" (Gossip) b/w "Monk Chant" (The Raincoats)
