= List of The Monks demos =

The Monks' 1964–1965 demos were professional studio recordings that preceded the album Black Monk Time. These have been released 3 times, all also including two tracks from a single by The Five Torquays (the band's name before transforming themselves into the Monks).

== Five Upstart Americans (Omplatten, 1999) ==
Five Upstart Americans

Demo album by The Monks
- Released: November 2, 1999
- Recorded: 1965
- Genre: Protopunk/Garage Rock
- Label: Omplatten

The Monks chronology
Black Monk Time (1966)	Five Upstart Americans (1999)	Let's Start a Beat - Live from Cavestomp (2000)

Professional ratings
Review scores
Source	Rating
Allmusic	link

Five Upstart Americans is the first release of earlier demo versions of songs from Black Monk Time, plus other previously unheard songs. It was released on CD in 1999 by Omplatten, Ltd.

=== Track listing ===
All tracks by The Monks

No.	Title	Length
1.	"Monk Time"	2:22
2.	"We Do Wie Du"	2:42
3.	"Boys Are Boys"	1:50
4.	"Pretty Suzanne"	3:47
5.	"Higgle Dy Piggle Dy"	4:11
6.	"Hushie Pushie"	2:58
7.	"Love Came Tumbling Down"	3:01
8.	"Oh How To Do Now"	2:53
9.	"Space Age"	2:39
10.	"I Hate You"	4:00

==== Bonus Tracks ====
A single by The 5 Torquays, an early incarnation of the Monks

No.	Title	Length
11.	"There She Walks"	2:37
12.	"Boys Are Boys"	3:06

=== Personnel ===
- Gary Burger – Liner Notes
- Jeff Gibson – Executive Producer
- Johan Kugelberg – Executive Producer
- Frank Longo – Art Direction

== Demo Tapes 1965 (Play Loud! Productions, 2007) ==
Demo Tapes 1965

Demo album by The Monks
- Released: August 8, 2007
- Recorded: 1965
- Genre: Protopunk/Garage Rock
- Label: Play Loud!/Munster Records

The Monks chronology
Let's Start a Beat - Live from Cavestomp (2000)	Demo Tapes 1965 (2007)	The Early Years 1964–1965 (2009)

Demo Tapes 1965 is the second release of the demos and was issued in Europe with a different track order, as well as an additional bonus track from a tribute album in 2007.

=== Track listing ===
- All songs written by Burger/Clark/Shaw/Day/Johnston

No.	Title	Length
1.	"Monk Time"	2:22
2.	"Love Came Tumbling Down"	3:01
3.	"Boys Are Boys"	1:50
4.	"Space Age"	2:39
5.	"We Do Wie Du"	2:41
6.	"I Hate You"	3:59
7.	"Pretty Suzanne"	3:46
8.	"Higgle-Dy-Piggle-Dy"	4:10
9.	"Hushie Pushie"	2:57
10.	"Oh, How To Do Now"	2:53

==== Bonus Tracks ====
No.	Title	Notes	Length
11.	"There She Walks"	A-side from the 5 Tourquays single	2:37
12.	"Boys Are Boys"	B-side from the 5 Tourquays single	3:05
13.	"Monk Hop"	Cover by Jason Forrest from the Silver Monk Time tribute album	2:10

== Personnel ==
- Gary Burger – guitar, vocals
- Larry Clark – organ
- Roger Johnston – drums
- Eddie Shaw – bass
- Dave Day – banjo
