= Let's Start a Beat – Live from Cavestomp =

Let's Start a Beat - Live from Cavestomp

Live album by The Monks
- Released: October 31, 2000
- Recorded: November 5, 1999
- Genre: Protopunk, garage rock
- Label: Cavestomp

The Monks chronology
Five Upstart Americans (1999)	Let's Start a Beat - Live from Cavestomp (2000)	Demo Tapes 1965 (2007)

Alternative Cover
- Cover of European release

Professional ratings
Review scores
Source	Rating
AllMusic	2.5/5 stars

Let's Start a Beat – Live from Cavestomp is a live album released by The Monks. It was recorded in 1999, 33 years after their only album Black Monk Time was released, and at their first-ever gig on home turf. Cavestomp was an annual event in New York City that reunited mid-sixties bands for a weekend of live music. Released in 2000 on Cavestomp Records. It was reissued in 2001 by Munster Records.

== Track listing ==
- All songs written by Burger/Clark/Shaw/Day/Johnston

No.	Title	Length
1.	"Monk Time"	3:21
2.	"Oh How to Do Now"	4:22
3.	"We Do Wie Du"	2:55
4.	"Boys Are Boys**"	1:42
5.	"Pretty Suzanne"	4:57
6.	"Hushie Pushie"	2:40
7.	"Cuckoo*"	3:23
8.	"Complication"	2:59
9.	"That's My Girl"	4:06
10.	"Shut Up"	3:40
11.	"I Can't Get Over You*"	2:34
12.	"Higgle-Dy Piggle-Dy***"	3:16
13.	"Blast Off!"	3:27
14.	"I Hate You"	5:57
15.	"Monk Jam"	5:58
16.	"An Inspirational Message"	1:44

=== Enhanced CD content ===
1. Live performance video of "Complication", "Cuckoo" and "Shut Up"
2. Trailer for Monks: The Transatlantic Feedback, a documentary on the Monks

== Personnel ==
- All lead vocals by Gary Burger except *lead vocal by Roger Johnston; **lead vocal by Dave Day & Eddie Shaw; ***lead vocal by Mike Fornatale
- Gary Burger – lead vocals and guitar
- Larry Clark – organ and vocals
- Dave Day – banjo and vocals
- Roger Johnston – drums and vocals
- Eddie Shaw – bass and vocals

== Release history ==
Region	Date	Title	Label	Format	Catalog
USA	October 31, 2000	Let's Start a Beat – Live from Cavestomp	Cavestomp Records/Varèse Sarabande	CD	302 066 193 2
Spain	2001	...Let's Start a Beat!	Munster Records	LP/CD	MR 207 [LP], MR CD 207 [CD]
USA	February 17, 2015	Monk Jam	Rockbeat Records	CD/Download	ROC-CD-3295
