= List of 2016 deaths in popular music =

This is a list of notable performers of rock music and other forms of popular music, and others directly associated with the music as producers, songwriters, or in other closely related roles, who died in 2016.

== 2016 deaths in popular music ==
Preceded by 2015	List of deaths in popular music 2016	Succeeded by 2017

Name	Age	Date	Location	Cause of death
Luciana Gonzales Italian singer	81	2016	Lodi, Italy	
Primo Brown Italian rapper for the Cor Veleno	39	January 1, 2016	Rome, Italy	
Rino Salviati Italian singer, guitarist and film actor	93	January 2, 2016	Rome, Italy	Natural causes related to advanced age
Long John Hunter	84	January 4, 2016	Phoenix, Arizona, United States	
Robert Stigwood; Manager for the Bee Gees, Cream	81	January 4, 2016	London, England	
Otis Clay	73	January 8, 2016	Chicago, Illinois, U.S.	Heart attack
David Bowie; Arnold Corns, The Riot Squad, Tin Machine	69	January 10, 2016	Manhattan, New York, U.S.	Liver cancer
Giorgio Gomelsky; Manager for The Rolling Stones, The Yardbirds, The Paramounts	81	January 13, 2016	New York City, New York, U.S.	Cancer
Pete Huttlinger; The John Denver Band	54	January 15, 2016	Nashville, Tennessee, U.S.	Stroke
Gary Loizzo; The American Breed	70	January 16, 2016	Orland Park, Illinois, U.S.	Pancreatic cancer
Blowfly	76	January 17, 2016	Lauderdale Lakes, Florida, U.S.	Liver cancer
Mic Gillette; Tower of Power	64	January 17, 2016	Concord, California, U.S.	Heart attack
Dale Griffin; Mott the Hoople, British Lions	67	January 17, 2016	London, UK	Alzheimer's disease
Glenn Frey; Eagles	67	January 18, 2016	New York City, New York, U.S.	Rheumatoid arthritis, acute ulcerative colitis and pneumonia while recovering from intestinal surgery
Jimmy Bain; Rainbow, Wild Horses, Dio, Last in Line	68	January 23, 2016	MSC Divina, Atlantic Ocean	Lung cancer
Black	53	January 26, 2016	Cork, Ireland	Traffic accident
T. J. Tindall; MFSB	65	January 26, 2016	New Hope, Pennsylvania, U.S.	Cancer
Paul Kantner; Jefferson Airplane, Jefferson Starship, KBC Band	74	January 28, 2016	San Francisco, California, U.S.	Multiple organ failure
Signe Toly Anderson; Jefferson Airplane	74	January 28, 2016	Beaverton, Oregon, U.S.	COPD
Billy Faier	85	January 29, 2016	Alpine, Texas, U.S.	
Michael Kroeger Ampage	55	January 31, 2016	Los Angeles, California, U.S.	Leukemia
Jon Bunch; Further Seems Forever, Sense Field	45	February 1, 2016	Long Beach, California, U.S.	Suicidal overdose
Maurice White; Earth, Wind & Fire	74	February 4, 2016	Los Angeles, California, U.S.	Parkinson's disease
Joe Dowell	76	February 4, 2016	Bloomington, Illinois, U.S.	Heart attack
Dan Hicks; The Charlatans	74	February 6, 2016	Mill Valley, California, U.S.	Liver cancer
Kipišas; Member of Kastaneda	37	February 12, 2016	Vilnius, Lithuania	Cardiac arrest
L. C. Ulmer	87	February 14, 2016	Ellisville, Mississippi, U.S.	Natural causes
Vanity; Vanity 6	57	February 15, 2016	Fremont, California, U.S.	Kidney failure
Paul Gordon; The B-52's	52	February 18, 2016	Nashville, Tennessee, U.S.	Heart disease
Vi Subversa; Poison Girls	80	February 19, 2016	Brighton, Brighton and Hove, UK	
Piotr Grudziński; Riverside	40	February 21, 2016	Warsaw, Poland	Pulmonary embolism
Hans Reffert; Guru Guru	69	February 21, 2016	Mannheim, Germany	
Lennie Baker; Sha Na Na	69	February 24, 2016	Weymouth, Massachusetts, U.S.	Infection
Josefin Nilsson	46	February 29, 2016	Själsö, Gotland, Sweden	
Aron Burton	77	February 29, 2016	Chicago, Illinois, U.S.	Heart failure and diabetes
Gayle McCormick; Smith	67	March 1, 2016	St. Louis, Missouri, United States	Cancer
Chip Hooper; Phish, Dave Matthews Band	53	March 5, 2016	Carmel-by-the-Sea, California, U.S.	Cancer
Ross Hannaford; Daddy Cool, Mighty Kong	65	March 8, 2016	Melbourne, Victoria, Australia	Cancer
George Martin; The Beatles, America	90	March 8, 2016	Highbury, London, England	
Naná Vasconcelos; Pat Metheny Group	71	March 9, 2016	Rio de Janeiro, Brazil	Lung cancer
Keith Emerson; Emerson, Lake & Palmer	71	March 10, 2016	Santa Monica, California, U.S.	Suicide
Tommy Brown	84	March 12, 2016	Atlanta, Georgia, U.S.	
Phife Dawg; A Tribe Called Quest	45	March 22, 2016	Oakley, California, U.S.	Complications related to diabetes
Jimmy Riley	68	March 22, 2016	New York, U.S.	
Paolo Poli Italian actor, theatre director and singer	86	March 25, 2016	Rome, Italy	Cerebal ischemia
Gianmaria Testa Italian singer-songwriter	57	March 30, 2016	Alba, Italy	Cancer (tumor)
Giorgio Calabrese Italian lyricist and television author	86	March 31, 2016	Rome, Italy	
Gato Barbieri	83	April 2, 2016	New York, U.S.	Pneumonia
Jelena Marjanović; Serbian singer	32	April 3, 2016	Belgrade, Serbia	Murder
Kōji Wada Japanese singer and blogger, best remembered for his songs in the animated series Digimon and his debut song "Butter-Fly"	42	April 3, 2016	Tokyo, Japan	Complications from upper pharynx (nasopharynx) cancer
Carlo Mastrangelo; The Belmonts	78	April 4, 2016	Boynton Beach, Florida, U.S.	
Leon Haywood	74	April 5, 2016	Los Angeles, California, U.S.	
Merle Haggard	79	April 6, 2016	Palo Cedro, California, U.S.	Pneumonia
Jade Lemons; Guitarist for Injected	43	April 6, 2016	U.S.	Drug overdose
Dennis Davis	66	April 6, 2016	Manhattan, New York City, U.S.	Cancer
Jimmie Van Zant	59	April 7, 2016	Florida, U.S.	Liver cancer
Emile Ford	78	April 11, 2016	London, England	
Gib Guilbeau; Flying Burrito Brothers	78	April 12, 2016	Palmdale, California, United States	
Lonnie Mack	74	April 21, 2016	Smithville, Tennessee, U.S	Natural causes
Prince; Prince and The Revolution, New Power Generation	57	April 21, 2016	Chanhassen, Minnesota, U.S.	Accidental fentanyl toxicity
Billy Paul	81	April 24, 2016	Gloucester Township, New Jersey, U.S.	Pancreatic cancer
Piero Calabrese Italian composer, record producer and singer	57	April 28, 2016	Rome, Italy	Heart attack
Harrison Calloway; Muscle Shoals Horns	75	April 30, 2016	Jackson, Mississippi, U.S.	Stroke
Phil Ryan; Man, Pete Brown, Neutrons	69	April 30, 2016	Denmark	
Isao Tomita	84	May 5, 2016	Tokyo, Japan	
Candye Kane	54	May 6, 2016	Los Angeles, California, U.S.	Complications from pancreatic cancer
John Stabb; Government Issue	54	May 7, 2016	Rockville, Maryland, U.S.	Stomach cancer
Luther Simmons; The Main Ingredient	74	May 9, 2016	Harlem, New York, United States	Cancer
Peter Behrens; Trio	68	May 11, 2016	Wilhelmshaven, Lower Saxony, Germany	Multiple organ failure
Julius La Rosa	86	May 12, 2016	Crivitz, Wisconsin, U.S.	Natural causes
Emilio Navaira	53	May 16, 2016	New Braunfels, Texas, U.S.	
Guy Clark	74	May 17, 2016	Nashville, Tennessee, U.S.	
Lino Toffolo Italian actor and singer-songwriter	81	May 17, 2016	Murano, Venice, Italy	Heart attack
John Berry; Beastie Boys	52	May 19, 2016	Danvers, Massachusetts, U.S.	Frontotemporal dementia
Nick Menza; Megadeth, OMH	51	May 21, 2016	Studio City, California, U.S.	Heart failure
Magica Aidan Italian singer	60	May 22, 2016	Vercelli, Italy	
Marshall "Rock" Jones; Ohio Players	75	May 27, 2016	Houston, Texas, U.S.	Cancer
Reshad Feild; The Springfields	82	May 31, 2016	Devon, England	
Dave Swarbrick; Fairport Convention	75	June 3, 2016	Aberystwyth, Wales	Emphysema
Habib	68	June 10, 2016	Ramsar, Mazandaran, Iran	Cardiac arrest
Christina Grimmie	22	June 10, 2016	Orlando, Florida, U.S.	Gunshot
Chips Moman	79	June 12, 2016	LaGrange, Georgia, U.S.	Lung disease
Chris Warren	49	June 12, 2016	Valley Cottage, Rockland Country, New York, U.S.	
Henry McCullough; Wings	72	June 14, 2016	Ballywindelland, Ballymoney, Northern Ireland	Stroke
Attrell Cordes; P.M. Dawn	46	June 17, 2016	Neptune City, New Jersey, U.S.	Renal disease
Sverre Kjelsberg; The Pussycats	69	June 19, 2016	Tromsø, Norway	
Wayne Jackson; The Mar-Keys	74	June 21, 2016	Memphis, Tennessee, U.S.	Heart failure
Jim Boyd; The Jim Boyd Band	60	June 21, 2016	Washington, U.S.	
Bill Ham; Manager for ZZ Top	79	June 22, 2016	Austin, Texas, U.S.	
Douglas M. Lackey American composer and music editor	83	June 22, 2016	Woodland Hills, Los Angeles, California, United States	
Bernie Worrell; Parliament, Funkadelic, Colonel Claypool's Bucket of Bernie Brains	72	June 24, 2016	Everson, Washington, U.S.	Lung cancer
Mack Rice; The Falcons	82	June 27, 2016	Detroit, Michigan, U.S.	Complications resulting from Alzheimer's disease
Scotty Moore	84	June 28, 2016	Nashville, Tennessee, U.S.	
Rob Wasserman; RatDog	64	June 29, 2016	Los Angeles, California, U.S.	Undisclosed
William Hawkins	76	July 4, 2016	Ottawa, Ontario, Canada	
Danny Smythe; The Box Tops	67	July 6, 2016	Plainfield, Illinois, U.S.	
Geneviève Castrée	35	July 9, 2016	Anacortes, Washington, United States	Pancreatic cancer
El Lebrijano	75	July 13, 2016	Seville, Spain	
Roland Prince	69	July 15, 2016	Saint John's, Antigua and Barbuda	
Alan Vega; Suicide	78	July 16, 2016	New York City, New York, U.S.	
Gary S. Paxton; Record producer for Skip & Flip, The Hollywood Argyles	77	July 17, 2016	Branson, Missouri, U.S.	Complications of heart surgery and liver disease
Lewis Steinberg; Booker T. & the M.G.'s	82	July 21, 2016	Memphis, Tennessee, U.S.	Cancer
Keith Gemmell; Audience	68	July 24, 2016	Beltinge, Herne Bay, UK	Throat cancer
Allan Barnes; The Blackbyrds	67	July 26, 2016	Detroit, Michigan, U.S.	Heart attack
Einojuhani Rautavaara	87	July 26, 2016	Helsinki, Finland	
Sandy Pearlman; Blue Öyster Cult, The Clash, Black Sabbath	72	July 26, 2016	Marin County, California, U.S.	Pneumonia and complication from a stroke
Lucille Dumont	97	July 29, 2016	Canada	
Ricci Martin; Dean Martin's son	62	August 3, 2016	Salt Lake City, Utah, United States	Unknown
Snaffu Rigor; Music group from Cinderella	69	August 4, 2016	Manila, Philippines	Lung cancer
Pete Fountain	86	August 6, 2016	New Orleans, Louisiana, U.S.	Heart failure
B.E. Taylor	65	August 7, 2016	Wheeling, West Virginia, U.S.	Brain tumor
Pádraig Duggan; Clannad	67	August 9, 2016	Dublin, Ireland	After a recurring illness
Glenn Yarbrough; The Limeliters	86	August 11, 2016	Nashville, Tennessee, U.S.	Dementia
Ruby Wilson	68	August 12, 2016	Memphis, Tennessee, U.S.	Heart attack
Bobby Hutcherson	75	August 15, 2016	Montara, California, U.S.	Emphysema
James Woolley; 2wo, Nine Inch Nails	49	August 17, 2016	Lake Forest, Illinois	Fell off a ladder
Horacio Salgán	100	August 19, 2016	Buenos Aires, Argentina	
Lou Pearlman; Record producer and manager for NSYNC, Backstreet Boys, O-Town	62	August 19, 2016	Miami, Florida, U.S.	Cardiac arrest
Matt Roberts; 3 Doors Down	38	August 20, 2016	West Bend, Wisconsin	Prescription drug overdose
Louis Stewart	72	August 20, 2016	Harold's Cross, Dublin, Ireland	Cancer
Toots Thielemans	94	August 22, 2016	Brussels, Belgium	
Gilli Smyth; Gong	83	August 22, 2016	Byron Bay, Australia	Pulmonary pneumonia
Rudy Van Gelder	91	August 25, 2016	Englewood Cliffs, New Jersey, U.S.	Natural causes
Vito Marletta Italian singer-songwriter and musician	47	August 27, 2016	Milan, Italy	Suicide
Juan Gabriel	66	August 28, 2016	Santa Monica, California, U.S.	Heart attack
Fred Hellerman	89	September 1, 2016	Weston, Connecticut, U.S.	
Jerry Heller; Music manager for N.W.A	75	September 2, 2016	Cleveland, Ohio, U.S.	Heart attack
Carlo D'Angiò Italian singer-songwriter, musician	70	September 5, 2016	Naples, Italy	
Sergio Renda Italian singer and actor	90	September 5, 2016	Cremona, Italy	
Lewis Merenstein; Record producer	81	September 6, 2016	New York City, New York	Pneumonia
Clifford Curry	79	September 7, 2016	Knoxville, Tennessee, U.S.	Stroke
Prince Buster	78	September 8, 2016	Miami, Florida, U.S.	Stroke
Jerry Corbetta; Sugarloaf	68	September 16, 2016	Denver, Colorado, U.S.	Pick's disease
John D. Loudermilk	82	September 21, 2016	Christiana, Tennessee, U.S.	Bone cancer
Kashif; B. T. Express	59	September 25, 2016	Los Angeles, California, U.S.	
Jean Shepard	82	September 25, 2016	Gallatin, Tennessee, U.S.	
Hagen Liebing; Die Ärzte	55	September 25, 2016	Berlin, Germany	Brain tumor
Rod Temperton; Heatwave	66	September 25, 2016	London, England	Cancer
Joe Clay	78	September 26, 2016	Gretna, Louisiana, U.S.	
Jonathan David Brown; Record producer & audio engineer	60	September 27, 2016	Ozark, Missouri, U.S.	
Nora Dean	72	September 29, 2016	Connecticut, U.S.	
Laura Troschel Italian actress and singer	71	September 29, 2016	Rome, Italy	
Michael Casswell	53	September 30, 2016	Níjar, Spain	Drowning
Oscar Brand	96	September 30, 2016	Great Neck, New York, U.S.	Pneumonia
Sandra Mantovani Italian singer and ethnomusicologist	88	October 1, 2016	Milan, Italy	
Steve Byrd	61	October 2, 2016	Munich, Germany	Heart attack
Caroline Crawley	53	October 4, 2016	England, UK	
Don Ciccone; The Four Seasons, Tommy James and the Shondells, The Critters	70	October 8, 2016	Ketchum, Idaho, U.S.	
Michiyuki Kawashima; Boom Boom Satellites	47	October 9, 2016	Tokyo, Japan	Brain tumor
Bored Nothing	26	October 9, 2016	Melbourne, Australia	Suicide
Robert Bateman; Record producer	80	October 12, 2016	Sherman Oaks, Los Angels, California, United States	Heart attack
Sonny Sanders	77	October 12, 2016	Detroit, Michigan, U.S.	
Dario Fo Italian playwright, actor, director, writer, author, singer-songwriter, lyricist, illustrator, painter, set designer, activist, and comedian	90	October 13, 2016	Milan, Italy	Respiratory failure and lung problems
Werner Lämmerhirt	67	October 14, 2016	Bodenwerder, Germany	
Bobby Ellis	84	October 18, 2016	Kingston, Jamaica	Pneumonia related
Pete Burns; Dead or Alive	57	October 23, 2016	London, England	Cardiac arrest
Bobby Vee	73	October 24, 2016	Rogers, Minnesota, U.S.	Alzheimer's disease
John Zacherle	98	October 27, 2016	New York City, New York, U.S.	
Norman Brokaw; American talent agent	89	October 29, 2016	Beverly Hills, California, U.S.	
Bap Kennedy	54	November 1, 2016	Belfast, Northern Ireland	Pancreatic and bowel cancer
Bob Cranshaw	83	November 2, 2016	Manhattan, New York, U.S.	Cancer
Kay Starr	94	November 3, 2016	Bel Air, Los Angeles, U.S.	Complications from Alzheimer's disease
Eddie Harsch; The Black Crowes	59	November 4, 2016	Toronto, Ontario, Canada	
Jean-Jacques Perrey	87	November 4, 2016	Lausanne, Switzerland	Lung cancer
Leonard Cohen	82	November 7, 2016	Los Angeles, California, U.S.	Cancer
Jimmy Young	95	November 7, 2016	London, England	
Jonas Girijotas; Member of Edmundas Kuodis Ir Jonas Girijotas	81	November 9, 2016	Vilnius, Lithuania	Unknown
Al Caiola	96	November 9, 2016	Allendale, New Jersey, U.S.	
Victor Bailey; Weather Report	56	November 11, 2016	Stafford, Virginia, U.S.	Charcot-Marie-Tooth disease
Doug Edwards; Skylark, Chilliwack	70	November 11, 2016	Vancouver, British Columbia, U.S.	
Saki Kaskas; Best known from his soundtracks in the Need for Speed Series	45	November 11, 2016	Vancouver, Canada	Drug overdose
Cranio Randagio Italian rapper	22	November 12, 2016	Rome, Italy	Acute cardiorespiratory failure caused by a lethal overdose from a cocktail of drugs and alcohol
Leon Russell	74	November 13, 2016	Mount Juliet, Tennessee, U.S.	Heart surgery
David Mancuso; Known from The Loft	72	November 14, 2016	New York, New York, U.S.	
Mose Allison	89	November 15, 2016	Hilton Head, South Carolina, U.S.	Natural causes
Cliff Barrows; Music director from Billy Graham Evangelistic Association	93	November 15, 2016	Charlotte, North Carolina, U.S.	
Milt Okun; American arranger, record producer and co-founder of the Cherry Lane Music Publishing Company	92	November 15, 2016	Beverly Hills, California, U.S.	
Mentor Williams	70	November 16, 2016	Taos, New Mexico, U.S.	Lung cancer
Sharon Jones; Sharon Jones & The Dap-Kings	60	November 18, 2016	Cooperstown, New York, U.S.	Pancreatic cancer
Hugh McDonald; Redgum	62	November 18, 2016	Melbourne, Australia	Prostate cancer
Blakdyak	46	November 21, 2016	Sampaloc, Manila, Philippines	
Craig Gill; Inspiral Carpets	44	November 22, 2016	Oldham, UK	Suicide
Colonel Abrams	67	November 24, 2016	New York City, New York, U.S.	Diabetes
Tony Martell; American music industry and senior executive	90	November 27, 2016	Madison, New Jersey, U.S.	
Carlton Kitto	74	November 28, 2016	Calcutta, India	
Ray Columbus; Ray Columbus and the Invaders	74	November 29, 2016	Snells Beach, North Auckland, New Zealand	Heart attack
Mark Gray; Exile	64	December 2, 2016	Lebanon, Tennessee, U.S.	
Harry Balk; Record producer and record company executive	91	December 3, 2016	Oak Park, Michigan, U.S.	
Herbert Hardesty	91	December 3, 2016	Las Vegas, Nevada, U.S.	Cancer
Wayne Duncan; Daddy Cool	72	December 4, 2016	Melbourne, Australia	Stroke
Radim Hladik; Blue Effect	69	December 4, 2016	Czech Republic	Pulmonary fibrosis
Junaid Jamshed; Vital Signs	52	December 7, 2016	Havelian, Khyber Pakhtunkhwa, Pakistan	Plane accident
Greg Lake; Emerson, Lake & Palmer, King Crimson	69	December 7, 2016	London, England	Cancer
Bob Krasnow; Record producer and music executive from Elektra Records	82	December 11, 2016	Wellington, Florida, U.S.	Organ dysfunction
Barrelhouse Chuck	58	December 12, 2016	Libertyville, Illinois, U.S.	Prostate cancer
Jim Lowe	93	December 12, 2016	East Hampton, Long Island, New York, U.S.	
Bunny Walters	63	December 14, 2016	Hamilton, New Zealand	
Gordie Tapp; Host of the hit TV show Hee Haw	94	December 18, 2016	Burlington, Ontario, Canada	
Gianni Mascolo Italian singer	76	December 21, 2016	London, England	
Mick Zane; Malice	57	December 23, 2016	Los Angeles, California, United States	Brain cancer
Rick Parfitt; Status Quo	68	December 24, 2016	Marbella, Spain	Septicaemia and following complications to a shoulder injury
George Michael; Wham!	53	December 25, 2016	Goring-on-Thames, Oxfordshire, England	Heart failure
Alphonse Mouzon; Weather Report, The Eleventh House	68	December 25, 2016	Granada Hills, California, U.S.	Neuroendocrine carcinoma
Allan Williams; Businessman and talent manager from the Beatles	86	December 30, 2016	Liverpool, England	

== See also ==
- List of murdered musicians
