= The Monks =

American rock band

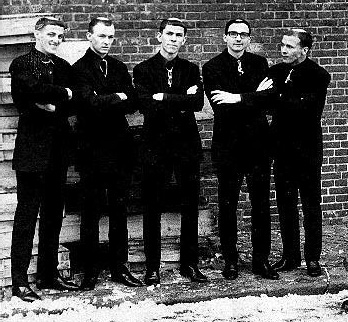
- The Monks in 1966

Background information
- Also known as: Monks; The Torquays (early)
- Origin: Gelnhausen, West Germany
- Genres: Proto-punk; garage rock; experimental rock; beat
- Years active: 1964–1967, 1999, 2004, 2006–2007
- Labels: Polydor, Third Man
- Past members: Gary Burger; Larry Clark; Eddie Shaw; Dave Day; Roger Johnston
- Website: the-monks.com

The Monks (also known as Monks), were an American rock band formed in Gelnhausen, West Germany, in 1964. Assembled by five American GIs stationed in the country, the group grew tired of the traditional format of rock, which motivated them to forge a highly experimental style characterized by an emphasis on rhythm over melody, augmented by a heavy use of distortion.

The band blended shrill vocals, anti-Vietnam war lyrics, guitar feedback, and a six-string banjo into a sound that music critics later recognized as prefiguring the punk rock movement. The band's appearance was considered as shocking as their music, mimicking the look of Catholic monks by wearing black habits, cinctures, and styling medieval tonsure haircuts. Local newspapers at the time labelled the band "the anti-Beatles". In March 1966, they released their sole studio album, Black Monk Time, via Polydor Records, with the help of a German management team, alongside their single "Complication" backed with "Oh, How to Do Now". However, the album and additional singles issued throughout 1966 and 1967 achieved limited success which led to the group disbanding.

During the 1990s to early 2000s, the band acquired a cult following as a result of newfound interest in Black Monk Time. They were subsequently featured on several compilation albums, most notably the 1998 expanded version of Nuggets. This resurgence was followed by all five of the original band members holding a reunion concert at the Cavestomp festival in New York City on November 5, 1999, which was followed by sporadic touring in the 2000s. They have been cited as an influence by notable artists such as Jello Biafra, Jay Reatard, Mark E. Smith, Lenny Kaye, Krist Novoselic, Ira Kaplan, Jack White, Jon Spencer, Iggy Pop, and the Beastie Boys.

== Musical style ==
According to Stephen M. Deusner of Paste Magazine: "The Monks were all rhythm section, with every instrument clicking into a tense lockstep punctuated by Gary Burger’s wild-man yelps and Dave Day’s electrified banjo—an instrument as distinct as the Thirteenth Floor Elevators’ electric jug. In their lusty frivolity, The Monks find a measure of gravity and outrage." Their style was self-described as "Über-beat". In 2011, bassist Eddie Shaw underlined their musical process in an interview:

To develop something new we developed a process known as deconstructing and reconstructing, laying down bass and drum patterns to be added to, by the other instruments. We made best use of each individual’s tendencies and abilities. In fact we made it very minimalist – single loud/distorted bass notes on the beat – drums with no cymbals except for accents – banjo rock and roll chords because it was a hard trashy sound – guitar, using the feedback – and organ playing beats and wild solos. All instruments were played as rhythm instruments.

The Guardian cited the minimal drumming style of the album as a precursor to krautrock, noting an early form of the "motorik" beat in Roger Johnston's performance, which was described as "tightly wound playing".

== History ==
=== Beginnings (1963–1964) ===
The nucleus of the Monks formed in late 1963, when American G.I.s Gary Burger (lead guitar, vocals), Larry Clark (organ), Eddie Shaw (bass guitar), and Dave Day (rhythm guitar), along with a West German civilian identified simply as Hans (drums) came together as a quintet known as the Torquays, a name inspired by Burger's admiration for the Fireballs' instrumental "Torquay". Burger and Day had previously spent time together informally performing as an on-duty musical duo called the Rhythm Rockers, which soon recruited Clark and Hans to bolster their sound. Soon after, Shaw auditioned for the band and was reluctantly accepted by Burger. Shaw, a jazz musician by trade, was recruited largely because the band urgently needed a bass guitarist rather than for his limited experience with the instrument. The band first performed at military hangouts near their outpost in Gelnhausen, Hesse, playing a combination of American rock and roll standards from the 1950s and some original songs penned by Burger and Day to rowdy crowds and servicemen.

After seeing the band at the Maxim Club, talent manager Hans Reich convinced the Torquays to stay in Germany when their military careers came to a close with the promise of work. For a brief period, the band included vocalist Zack Zachariah and drummer Bob Rose; however, the two were forced to excuse themselves from the Torquays because their discharges were long after the other band members'. Burger solved the issue relatively quickly by introducing the band to drummer Roger Johnston, and, henceforth solidifying the line-up which would exist for the duration of the group's recording career. As the Torquays began to rehearse, Burger arranged a one-off single deal for the group at an independent studio in Heidelberg. The single, which coupled the band originals "There She Walks" and "Boys Are Boys", had 500 copies pressed in late 1964, which were sold by Clark at live performances. This single was later collected on the compilation album Five Upstart Americans.

In early 1965, the Torquays began a residency at the Rio Bar in Stuttgart, which they used to experiment with electronics and sound manipulation and expand their repertoire. It was during the rehearsals at the Rio Bar that the group's signature style, including abrasive feedback and high-volume distortion, began to emerge. Sensing potential to expand upon their sound, a German management team composed of Karl Remy, Walther Niemann, and Günther and Kiki Aulich signed the Torquays to promote an entirely new image and hone their ensemble playing. During one of the first sessions with the team, the band decided to rename themselves the Monks, a moniker that was initially met with some misgivings by Clark, whose father was a priest.

=== Experimentation and album (1965–1966) ===
Under the supervision of the management team, the Monks conducted extensive rehearsals with a focus on gritty, rhythmically oriented music. The band equipped themselves with new instruments and hardware to achieve that goal: a Maestro Fuzz-Tone (and later a wah-wah pedal) for Burger, a floor tom for Johnston, and a six-string banjo for Day, the latter of which offered a disorienting counter-rhythm to the bass section. Shaw explained that the group's motivation was to possess "high rhythm and high energy". He elaborated further, saying "The idea of it was to get as much 'beat' out of it as we could. As much 'bam-bam-bam-bam' on the beat or whatever. The only time cymbals would be used would be for accent. If anyone wasn't contributing towards rhythm, then it wasn't part of the Monks sound". However, the band's transformation into the Monks was slow, taking the group nearly a year of trial and error before they were confident enough to return to the studio.

In September 1965, the Monks recorded new, self-penned compositions to present to Polydor Records. However, Polydor was reluctant to sign the band to a recording contract until they performed at the Top Ten Club in Hamburg, where the Beatles had garnered attention three years earlier. Much was made at the time of the Monks' unconventional attire, with their tailored-made black robes strikingly at odds with the prevailing trends among contemporary beat groups. With all five members abandoning their Beatlesque hairdos for tonsures and plain rope serving ties, the band exuded a mysterious aura, while also looking menacingly non-conformist. The Monks' image was met with mixed attitudes from their audiences. Younger fans were playfully curious about the band's eccentric appearance, but conservative patrons were shocked and at times furious at what they considered blasphemy. The group's relative detachment from the crowd was compounded by a loud and dissonant "steamroller of sound" intended to challenge and not necessarily please audiences.

Polydor Records was willing to gamble on the Monks' radical approach, and the band entered a studio in Cologne in November 1965. The recording sessions for Black Monk Time brought the band to the edge of exhaustion, as they had to juggle nightly performances alongside Bill Haley and His Comets with early morning work in the studio. Another challenge was record producer Jimmy Bowien's limited resources to properly record the Monks' loud acoustics to four-track tape. The band members had to play behind baffles in separate corners of the studio.

In May 1966, Polydor Records released Black Monk Time and the "Complication" single. The striking approach that the Monks had taken on rock music was a precursor to punk rock. Burger's bursts of disorienting feedback was played through a heavily modified Vox Super Beatle amplifier. The songs strayed far from the typical verse-chorus-bridge, but their emphasis on rhythm was nonetheless reminiscent of R&B music acts of the 1950s. Lyrically, Black Monk Time showcased blunt and paranoid commentary on the Vietnam War, social alienation, and love-hate relationships. Polydor did not release the album in the United States, considering it "too radical and non-commercial"; it was circulated on tape in the country in the 1980s and had developed a cult following by the early 1990s. The band itself re-released the album in 1994, marking the first time it was officially released in the US.

=== Changing musical direction (1966–1967) ===
The release of Black Monk Time was followed by press events, photo shoots with Charles Paul Wilp, and a six-month tour of one-nighters in music halls and bar taverns across West Germany, orchestrated by the newest member of their promotional team, Wolfgang Gluszczewski. Unfortunately, the tour was debilitating for the Monks, and their music often alienated new audiences attempting to catch on with the latest Monk craze. With the album underachieving in sales, Bowien urged the group to capitalize on the popularity of "soft wave" music, particularly the Beatles' song "Yellow Submarine". Although most of the band resisted the idea in favor of protecting their image, Day used the opportunity to introduce his love song, "Cuckoo", to the rest of the Monks. When the band returned to Hamburg for their second residency at the Top Ten Club, they recorded "Cuckoo" along with "I Can't Get Over You".

Soon after the release of "Cuckoo", the band promoted the single on the television program Beat-Club, and several radio stations, resulting in the record charting in some German markets. In particular, the Monks' music was appreciated by citizens in East Germany that heard the group on Radio Luxembourg, evident by the flow of fan mail arriving over the Iron Curtain. Shaw speculated the band's themes and idea of individualism were more accessible to Eastern Germans who were unable to express the same kind of individuality. Writer Mike Stax has noted that after the initial burst of publicity for "Cuckoo" subsided, the group had exhausted all outlets on the German music market and by late 1966 the Monks were looking to expand to other countries. The band took their act on a two-week tour of Sweden to positive reception, concluding with an appearance on Swedish National Television.

Upon their return to Germany in February 1967, the Monks learned that Polydor Records had refused to distribute Black Monk Time in the United States because of its commentary on the Vietnam War. At Carl Remy's recommendation, the Monks were scheduled to tour in Vietnam, and persuaded to incorporate subtle psychedelic rock influences into their third single, under the expectation that it could theoretically expand the Monks' dwindling audience. Additionally, the management team reiterated its ultimate goal of releasing two more Monks albums to be called Silver Monk Time and Gold Monk Time.

Following Remy's request, the band made tentative moves to change their sound on the single "Love Can Tame the Wild"/"He Went Down to the Sea". Gone were Day's banjo, Burger's frantic vocals, and Clark's organ, replaced by rhythm guitar, subdued singing, and calculated orchestration featuring Clark on piano and Shaw on trumpet. Monks historian Will Bedard would later deem the single "as uninspired as the LP was revolutionary". While performing with the Jimi Hendrix Experience in May 1967, there was increasing tension among the members of the group. Day became increasingly irritated by the addition of covers to the band's live set, and Burger and Johnston abandoned the Monk outfit in favor of colorful clothing to the annoyance of their bandmates. Despite the Monks' inner turmoil, the band was still arranged to depart for Vietnam from Frankfurt airport; however, just a day before the flight, Burger informed the band that Clark had returned to his hometown in Texas. Johnston, who had read about Buddhist monks that self-immolated in Vietnam, irrationally believed that the Monks would meet a similar fate at the hands of the Viet Cong. Without suitable replacements, the group disbanded in September 1967.

== Revival ==
In November 1999, to coincide with the release of Five Upstart Americans, the Monks, along with vocalist Mike Fornatale, reformed to headline Cavestomp in New York City, an annual event that resurrected garage bands of the 1960s. The three-day concert also featured the Chocolate Watchband and the Standells, and marked the Monks' first performance in the United States. Critic Jon Pareles of The New York Times wrote that Burger could no longer reach his falsetto, but "otherwise they were untouched by time or fashion". On October 31, 2000, tapes of the concert were released on the live album Let's Start a Beat – Live from Cavestomp.

The original Monks line-up performed together for the last time at the Rockaround event in Las Vegas, in 2004. Later in the year, Johnston died of lung cancer in November after a lengthy illness. A further set of reunions took place in England and Germany in 2006 and 2007 before the Monks officially disbanded. On January 10, 2008, Day died from a massive heart attack at the age of 66. Burger began a solo career thereafter, performing mostly with the Monks' repertoire until 2009. In 2014, Burger, who had been mayor of the tiny town of Turtle River, Minnesota since 2007, died of pancreatic cancer at the age of 71.

In 2009, "Pretty Suzanne" was released as a single over 40 years after it was recorded, backed with "Monk Time". The song originated as a "time consumer" instrumental called "Paradox" composed by Eddie Shaw and Dave Day. The Monks' managers took notice and pushed them to take to a harder direction. "Pretty Suzanne" was first recorded in 1965 as a demo. This early 1967 recording was recorded at Tonstudio Pfanz near Hamburg. Martin Christoph of Red Lounge Records discovered a single sided acetate of the 1967 recording in 2007, and it later was released as a bonus track on the 2009 Light in the Attic Records reissue of Black Monk Time and as a single released by Red Lounge Records.

== Legacy ==
In 1997, Henry Rollins, formerly of Black Flag, alongside Rick Rubin, released the first American reissue of Black Monk Time on their "Infinite Zero" record label.

In 2009, Light in the Attic released a reissue of Black Monk Time, which featured appraising quotes by several musicians. Artists such as Jello Biafra of Dead Kennedys, Jay Reatard, Fred Cole of Dead Moon, Casey Wescott of Fleet Foxes, Jared Swilley of Black Lips, Mark E. Smith of the Fall, Lenny Kaye of the Patti Smith Group, Krist Novoselic of Nirvana, Ira Kaplan of Yo La Tengo, Jack White of the White Stripes, Jon Spencer of the Jon Spencer Blues Explosion, Ade Blackburn of Clinic, Jochen Immler of Faust, Iggy Pop of the Stooges, and the Beastie Boys, were featured in the liner notes as fans of the record.

In 1994, Eddie Shaw published the autobiography Black Monk Time with help from his ex-wife Anita Klemke. Black Monk Time has been reissued numerous times on CD since the 1990s, and bonus tracks were included on the Light in the Attic Records release in 2009. In 1998, Lenny Kaye featured "Complication" on the expanded reissue of the compilation album, Nuggets. Subsequently, the song "I Hate You" was included in the soundtrack to the 1998 Coen Brothers film The Big Lebowski.

A tribute album, titled Silver Monk Time, containing tracks by numerous bands, was released in October 2006 as the soundtrack to the award-winning documentary Monks: The Transatlantic Feedback, artists included the Raincoats, Mark E. Smith and the Fall, Simeon Coxe of Silver Apples, Faust, Jon Spencer and Alan Vega of Suicide.

== Members ==
- Gary Burger - lead guitar, lead vocals, tambourine (died 2014)
- Larry Clark (born Lawrence Spangler) - organ, backing vocals, piano, tambourine
- Eddie Shaw (born Thomas Edward Shaw) - bass guitar, backing vocals, trumpet, brass, tambourine
- Dave Day (born David Havlicek) - rhythm guitar, banjo guitar, tambourine, backing vocals (died 2008)
- Roger Johnston - drums, backing vocals (died 2004)

Timeline

== Discography ==
=== Studio album ===
| Year | Album details |
|---|---|
| 1966 | Black Monk Time: Released: March 1966; Label: International Polydor Production (249 900); Formats: LP, CD |

=== EP ===
| Year | EP details |
|---|---|
| 2017 | Hamburg Recordings 1967: Released: June 23, 2017; Label: Third Man Records (TMR-374); Formats: single-sided vinyl, CD |

=== Singles ===
| Release date | A side | B side | Label |
|---|---|---|---|
| Late 1964 | "There She Walks" | "Boys Are Boys" | Tonstudio H. Scherer (SCH 73/74) [as the 5 Torquays] |
| March 1966 | "Complication" | "Oh, How to Do Now" | International Polydor Production (52 951) |
| 1966 | "Cuckoo" | "I Can't Get Over You" | International Polydor Production (52 957) |
| April 10, 1967 | "Love Can Tame the Wild" | "He Went Down to the Sea" | Polydor (52 958) |
| May 2009 | "Pretty Suzanne" | "Monk Time" | Red Lounge Records (RLR 057) |

=== Compilation albums ===
| Year | Album details |
|---|---|
| 1999 | Five Upstart Americans: Released: November 2, 1999; Label: Omplatten (FJORD 005); Format: CD |
| 2007 | Demo Tapes 1965: Released: August 8, 2007; Labels: Munster Records (mrcd-278); Play Loud! Productions (pl-cd-3); Formats: CD, LP |
| 2009 | The Early Years 1964–1965: Released: April 14, 2009; Label: Light In The Attic (LITA 041); Formats: CD, LP |

=== Live album ===
| Year | Album details |
|---|---|
| 2000 | Let's Start a Beat – Live from Cavestomp: Released: October 31, 2000; Labels: Cavestomp Records, Varèse Sarabande (302 066 193 2); Format:CD |

=== Tributes ===
- The Fall covered "I Hate You" (re-titled "Black Monk Theme Part I") and "Oh, How To Do Now" (re-titled "Black Monk Theme Part II") on their 1990 album Extricate and "Shut Up" on their 1994 album Middle Class Revolt.
- Silver Monk Time - A Tribute To The Monks (2006, Play Loud! Productions)
  - "Monk Time" b/w "Higgle-dy Piggle-dy" (2006, Play Loud! Productions) - a single from the above album
  - "Drunken Maria" b/w "Monk Chant" (2009, Play Loud! Productions) - a single from the above album
- IDLES song and video "IDLES Chant" from their EP Meat (2015) - a tribute to "Monk Chant"
