= Hamburg Recordings 1967 =

2017 extended play

EP by The Monks
- Released: June 23, 2017
- Recorded: 1967
- Length: 14:27
- Label: Third Man Records

The Monks chronology
The Early Years 1964–1965 (2009)	Hamburg Recordings 1967 (2017)

Hamburg Recordings 1967 is a 2017 EP that consists of some of the last recordings by The Monks. It was released June 23, 2017 by Third Man Records on CD and single sided 12" vinyl.

== Production ==
The first track, "I'm Watching You", was recorded during the same sessions as the Monks' last single "Love Can Tame the Wild"/"He Went Down to the Sea".

The remaining tracks were recorded after hours at the Top Ten Club in Hamburg, after the manager, Ricky Barnes, revealed he had a recording booth set up in the club they were performing at nightly. Under pressure from Polydor, they veered away from the harder Monk's style to a softer sound more like the mainstream music of the day. The vocal track for "Yellow Grass" went missing, so is presented here as an instrumental.

The recording of "I'm Watching You" was obtained by Gary Burger with the collection of one of the Monks' managers, Walther Niemann, who had died. He played it for Ben Blackwell of Third Man Records during a visit to Nashville, after which they tried to coordinate a 7" release of it, but it did not come to pass. After Burger died, Blackwell and Eddie Shaw approached his widow inquiring if there were any other Monks recordings in the collection. She found tapes containing multiple mixes of the Top Ten Club recordings. Some mistakes were found in the recordings that were corrected in the final mixes with help from Shaw. According to Shaw, the last track "Yellow Grass" had a vocal track, but this had apparently disappeared, so it is presented here as an instrumental.

== Critical reception ==
Professional ratings
Review scores
Source	Rating
Pitchfork	6.9/10

Pitchfork gave the EP a 6.9 out of 10 stating that the lighter tone of the music reflects the Monks' Hamburg contemporaries rather than the proto-punk pioneers they became revered as.

== Track listing ==
All tracks are written by Gary Burger, Larry Clark, Dave Havlicek, Roger Johnston, and Eddie Shaw.

No.	Title	Length
1.	"I'm Watching You"	3:18
2.	"Julia"	2:16
3.	"P.O. Box 3291"	3:18
4.	"I Need U Shatzi"	2:41
5.	"Yellow Grass"	2:54
