= List of 2015 deaths in popular music =

This is a list of notable performers of rock music and other forms of popular music, and others directly associated with the music as producers, songwriters, or in other closely related roles, who died in 2015.

== 2015 deaths in popular music ==
Preceded by 2014	List of deaths in popular music 2015	Succeeded by 2016

Name	Age	Date	Location	Cause of death
Jeff Golub	59	January 1, 2015	New York City, New York, U.S.	Progressive supra-nuclear palsy
Little Jimmy Dickens	94	January 2, 2015	Nashville, Tennessee, U.S.	Heart failure
Pino Daniele	59	January 4, 2015	Rome, Italy	Heart attack
Curtis Lee	75	January 8, 2015	Yuma, Arizona, U.S.	Cancer
Andraé Crouch	72	January 8, 2015	Los Angeles, California, U.S.	
Popsy Dixon; The Holmes Brothers	72	January 9, 2015	Richmond, Virginia, United States	Bladder cancer
Tim Drummond	74	January 11, 2015	Knoxville, Tennessee, U.S.	
A. J. Masters	72	January 12, 2015	Nashville, Tennessee, U.S.	Prostate cancer
Trevor Ward-Davies; Dave Dee, Dozy, Beaky, Mick & Tich	70	January 13, 2015	Devizes, England	Cancer
Kim Fowley; Record producer and songwriter; manager of the Runaways	75	January 15, 2015	Los Angeles, California, U.S.	Bladder cancer
Yao Beina	33	January 16, 2015	Shenzhen, China	Metastatic cancer
Dallas Taylor; Crosby, Stills, Nash & Young	66	January 18, 2015	Los Angeles, California, U.S.	Cancer
ASAP Yams; ASAP Mob	26	January 18, 2015	New York City, New York, U.S.	Drug overdose
Ward Swingle; The Swingle Singers	87	January 19, 2015	Eastbourne, England	
Edgar Froese; Tangerine Dream	70	January 20, 2015	Vienna, Austria	Pulmonary embolism
Rossana Ruffini Italian singer and actress	71	January 20, 2015	Vetralla, Viterbo, Italy	
Giancarlo Giomarelli Italian singer, lyricist and composer	70	January 24, 2015		
Demis Roussos; Aphrodite's Child	68	January 25, 2015	Athens, Greece	Pancreatic, stomach and liver cancer
Neil LeVang	83	January 26, 2015	Canyon Country, Santa Clarita, California, U.S.	Unknown
Danny McCulloch; The Animals	69	January 29, 2015	UK	
Maurizio Arcieri Italian singer and actor	72	January 29, 2015	Varese, Italy	
Don Covay	78	January 31, 2015	Franklin Square, New York, U.S.	Stroke
Andriy Kuzmenko; Skryabin	46	February 2, 2015	Lozuvatka, Dnipropetrovsk Oblast, Ukraine	Traffic accident
William Thomas McKinley	76	February 3, 2015	Reading, Massachusetts, U.S.	
Edward "Eddie The Kydd" Rendini; Guitarist for Darwin's Waiting Room, Cold	38	February 5, 2015	Altamonte Springs, Florida, U.S.	Undisclosed
Marisa Del Frate Italian singer and actress	83	February 6, 2015	Rome, Italy	
Joe B. Mauldin; The Crickets	74	February 7, 2015	Nashville, Tennessee, U.S.	Cancer
Calvin Jackson	54	February 10. 2015	Senatobia, Mississippi, U.S.	
Steve Strange; Strange Cruise, The Moors Murderers, The Photons, Visage	55	February 12, 2015	Sharm el-Sheikh, Egypt	Heart attack
Sam Andrew; Big Brother and the Holding Company	73	February 12, 2015	San Francisco, California, U.S.	Complication after open heart surgery
David Maxwell	71	February 13, 2015	Boston, Massachusetts, U.S.	Prostate cancer
Lesley Gore	68	February 16, 2015	Manhattan, New York, U.S.	Lung cancer
Mats Olausson; Talisman, Kamelot	54	February 18, 2015	Rayong, Thailand	Suicide
Clark Terry	94	February 21, 2015	Pine Bluff, Arkansas, U.S.	Diabetes
Ariel Camacho	22	February 25, 2015	Sinaloa, Mexico	Car accident
Giacomo Rondinella Italian singer	91	February 26, 2015	Fonte Nuova, Italy	
Maxee; Brownstone	46	February 28, 2015	Los Angeles, California, U.S.	Fatal cut from glass of a cup that shattered when she fell
Orrin Keepnews	91	March 1, 2015	El Cerrito, California, U.S.	
Lew Soloff; Blood, Sweat & Tears	71	March 8, 2015	New York City, New York, U.S.	Heart attack
Jimmy Greenspoon; Three Dog Night	67	March 11, 2015	North Potomac, Maryland, U.S.	Melanoma
Daevid Allen; Gong, Soft Machine	77	March 13, 2015	Byron Bay, Australia	Cancer
Mike Porcaro; Toto	59	March 15, 2015	Los Angeles, California, U.S.	Amyotrophic lateral sclerosis
Bruce Crump; Molly Hatchet	57	March 16, 2015	Richmond, Virginia, United States	Throat cancer
Andy Fraser; Free	62	March 16, 2015	Temecula, California, U.S.	Heart attack
Paul Jeffrey	81	March 20, 2015	North Carolina, U.S.	
A. J. Pero; Twisted Sister, Adrenaline Mob	55	March 20, 2015	Poughkeepsie, New York, U.S.	Heart attack
John Renbourn; Pentangle	70	March 26, 2015	Hawick, Scotland	Heart attack
Susumu Yokota	54	March 27, 2015	Japan	Unspecified long illness
Billy Butler	69	March 31, 2015	Chicago, Illinois, U.S.	
Bob Burns; Lynyrd Skynyrd	64	April 3, 2015	Bartow County, Georgia, U.S.	Traffic accident
Kayahan	66	April 3, 2015	Istanbul, Turkey	
Nando Paduano Italian singer	68	April 12, 2015	Naples, Italy	
Percy Sledge	74	April 14, 2015	Baton Rouge, Louisiana, U.S.	Liver cancer
Billy Ray Hearn; Record producer and co-founder of Myrrh Records and Sparrow Records	85	April 15, 2015	Nashville, Tennessee, United States	Heart disease
Johnny Kemp	55	April 16, 2015	Montego Bay, Jamaica	Hit and fall from ship
Slobodan Domanćinović; Serbian Folk singer	63	April 16, 2015	Negotin, Serbia	Unknown
Wally Lester; The Skyliners	73	April 21, 2015	Southport, North Carolina, U.S.	Pancreatic cancer
Jack Ely; The Kingsmen	71	April 27, 2015	Terrebonne, Oregon, U.S.	
Kęstutis Kazakevičius; Member of Broliai Aliukai	59	April 27, 2015	Kaunas, Lithuania	Unknown
Guy LeBlanc; Camel	54	April 27, 2015	Kemptville, Canada	Kidney cancer
Ben E. King; The Drifters	76	April 30, 2015	Hackensack University Medical Center, New Jersey, U.S.	Natural causes
Craig Gruber; Rainbow, Elf	63	May 5, 2015	Jacksonville, Florida, U.S.	Prostate cancer
Errol Brown; Hot Chocolate	71	May 6, 2015	Bahamas	Liver cancer
B.B. King	89	May 14, 2015	Las Vegas, Nevada, U.S.	Vascular dementia
Louis Johnson; The Brothers Johnson	60	May 21, 2015	Las Vegas, Nevada, U.S.	Gastrointestinal bleeding
Dennis Sheehan; Tour manager for U2	68	May 26, 2015	West Hollywood, California, U.S.	Heart attack
Kirill Pokrovsky; Russian musician and member of Aria, Master	53	June 1, 2015	Ghent, Belgium	Undisclosed
Ornette Coleman	85	June 11, 2015	New York City, New York, U.S.	Cardiac arrest
Big Time Sarah	62	June 13, 2015	Chicago, Illinois, U.S.	Heart complications
Remo Remotti Italian narrator, actor, and singer-songwriter	90	June 21, 2015	Rome, Italy	
James Horner	61	June 22, 2015	Southern California, U.S.	Plane crash
Cristiano Araújo	29	June 24, 2015	Goiânia, Goiás, Brazil	Car accident
Chris Squire; Yes	67	June 27, 2015	Phoenix, Arizona, U.S.	Acute erythroid leukemia
Ernie Maresca; The Regents	76	July 8, 2015	Florida, U.S.	
Michael Masser	74	July 9, 2015	Rancho Mirage, California, U.S.	
Hussein Fatal; Outlawz	42	July 10, 2015	Banks County, Georgia	Car crash
Eric Wrixon; Them, Thin Lizzy	68	July 13, 2015	Pontremoli, Italy	
Joan Sebastian	64	July 13, 2015	Teacalco, Morelos, Mexico	Bone cancer
Dave Somerville; The Diamonds	81	July 14, 2015	Santa Barbara, California, U.S.	Cancer
David Masondo; Member of The Soul Brothers	65	July 15, 2015	Johannesburg, South Africa	Undisclosed
Buddy Buie	74	July 18, 2015	Dothan, Alabama, U.S.	Heart attack
Dieter Moebius; Moebius & Plank, Harmonia, Cluster	71	July 20, 2015	Germany	Cancer
Theodore Bikel	91	July 21, 2015	Los Angeles, California, U.S.	
Mitch Aliotta; Rotary Connection	71	July 21, 2015	Las Vegas, Nevada, U.S.	Chronic obstructive pulmonary disease
Eddie Hardin; The Spencer Davis Group, Axis Point	66	July 22, 2015	France	Heart attack
Anna Marchetti Italian singer, active in the 1960s	69	July 23, 2015	Bologna, Italy	Long illness
Lynn Anderson	67	July 31, 2015	Nashville, Tennessee, U.S.	Heart attack
Cilla Black	72	August 1, 2015	Estepona, Costa del Sol, Spain	Stroke after a fall
Sean Price; Boot Camp Clik, Heltah Skeltah	43	August 8, 2015	New York City, New York, U.S.	
Giancarlo Golzi Italian drummer, members of the group Matia Bazar and the Museo Rosenbach	63	August 12, 2015	Bordighera, Italy	Heart attack
Bob Johnston	83	August 14, 2015	Nashville, Tennessee, U.S.	
Danny Sembello	52	August 15, 2015	Schuylkill River, Philadelphia, U.S.	Drowning
Smokey Wilson	79	September 8, 2015	Los Angeles, California, U.S.	
Bryn Merrick; The Damned	56	September 12, 2015	Cardiff, Wales	Cancer
Gary Richrath; REO Speedwagon	65	September 13, 2015	Bloomington, Illinois, U.S.	
Johnny "Yard Dog" Jones	74	September 15, 2015	Decatur, Illinois, U.S.	
Ben Cauley; The Bar-Kays	67	September 21, 2015	Memphis, Tennessee, U.S.	
Wilton Felder; The Crusaders	75	September 27, 2015	Whittier, California, U.S.	Multiple myeloma
Frankie Ford	76	September 28, 2015	Gretna, Louisiana, U.S.	Natural causes
Phil Woods	83	September 29, 2015	East Stroudsburg, Pennsylvania, U.S.	Emphysema
Rodolfo Maltese Guitarist and trumpet player of the progressive group Banco del Mutuo Soccorso	68	October 3, 2015	Rome, Italy	Long illness
Stasys Povilaitis; Lithuanian Pop singer and member of Nemuno Žiburiai, Nerija	68	October 6, 2015	Palanga, Lithuania	Lung cancer
Billy Joe Royal	73	October 6, 2015	Morehead City, North Carolina, U.S.	Natural causes
Jim Diamond; Ph.D.	64	October 8, 2015	London, England	Pulmonary edema
Bruce Nazarian; Brownsville Station	66	October 9, 2015	Detroit, Michigan, U.S.	Heart attack
Steve Mackay; The Stooges	66	October 10, 2015	Daly City, California, U.S.	Sepsis
Robbin Thompson; Steel Mill	66	October 10, 2015	Richmond, Virginia, U.S.	Cancer
Smokin' Joe Kubek	58	October 11, 2015	Wilmington, North Carolina, U.S.	Heart attack
Frank Watkins; Obituary, Gorgoroth	47	October 18, 2015	Florida, U.S.	Cancer
Cory Wells; Cory Wells & The Enemys, Three Dog Night	74	October 20, 2015	Dunkirk, New York, U.S.	Complications from multiple myeloma
Eddie Hoh; The Mamas & the Papas, The Monkees	71	November 7, 2015	Westmont, Illinois, U.S.	
Andy White; The Beatles	85	November 9, 2015	Caldwell, New Jersey, U.S.	Stroke
Allen Toussaint	77	November 10, 2015	Madrid, Spain	Heart attack
Phil Taylor; Motörhead	61	November 11, 2015	Hasland, England	Liver disease
P.F. Sloan	70	November 15, 2015	Los Angeles, California, U.S.	Pancreatic cancer
David Van Landing; Michael Schenker Group, Crimson Glory	51	November 17, 2015	Clearwater, Florida, U.S.	Car accident, collision
Cynthia Robinson; Sly and the Family Stone	69	November 23, 2015	Carmichael, California, U.S.	Cancer
Ronnie Bright; The Cadillacs, The Coasters, The Deep River Boys, The Valentines	77	November 26, 2015	New York City, New York, U.S.	Unknown causes
Wayne Bickerton	74	November 29, 2015	Hertfordshire, England	
Kelvin Knight; Drummer for Delta 5	56	December 2, 2015	York, England	Liver & kidney failure
Scott Weiland; Stone Temple Pilots, Velvet Revolver	48	December 3, 2015	Bloomington, Minnesota, U.S.	Drug overdose
Bonnie Lou	91	December 8, 2015	Cincinnati, Ohio, U.S.	Dementia
Rainer Bloss	69	December 10, 2015	Berlin, Germany	
Zemya Hamilton; Clubland	50	December 23, 2015	Sigtuna, Sweden	Multiple sclerosis
Stevie Wright; The Easybeats	68	December 27, 2015	South Coast, New South Wales, Australia	Pneumonia
Lemmy; Motörhead, Hawkwind	70	December 28, 2015	Los Angeles, California, U.S.	Prostate cancer, cardiac arrhythmia, and congestive heart failure
John Bradbury; The Specials	62	December 28, 2015	North London, England	
Natalie Cole	65	December 31, 2015	Los Angeles, California, U.S.	Congestive heart failure

== See also ==
- List of murdered hip hop musicians
- 27 Club
