= Turtle River, Minnesota =

City in Minnesota, United States

Turtle River
- City
- Location of Turtle River, Minnesota
- Coordinates: 47°35′36″N 94°45′48″W
- Country: United States
- State: Minnesota
- County: Beltrami

Area
  - Total: 1.07 sq mi (2.76 km^{2})
  - Land: 1.07 sq mi (2.76 km^{2})
  - Water: 0 sq mi (0.00 km^{2})
- Elevation: 1,332 ft (406 m)

Population (2020)
  - Total: 88
  - Density: 82.4/sq mi (31.83/km^{2})
- Time zone: UTC-6 (Central (CST))
  - Summer (DST): UTC-5 (CDT)
- ZIP code: 56601
- Area code: 218
- FIPS code: 27-65794
- GNIS feature ID: 0658777

Turtle River is a town in Beltrami County, Minnesota, United States. As of the 2020 census, Turtle River had a population of 88. The elevation is 1,332 ft (406m). It is approximately 17 miles northeast of Bemidji, where most community services are available. Turtle River consists of two stores, a restaurant, a gas station, and a church.

== Geography ==
According to the United States Census Bureau, the city has a total area of 1.11 square miles (2.87 km^{2}), all land.

== Politics ==
The mayor of Turtle River was Gary Burger (of rock band The Monks) from 2006 until his death in 2014.

== Demographics ==
Historical population
Census	Pop.	Note	%±
1910	108		—
1920	74		−31.5%
1930	109		47.3%
1940	90		−17.4%
1950	57		−36.7%
1960	48		−15.8%
1970	50		4.2%
1980	60		20.0%
1990	62		3.3%
2000	75		21.0%
2010	77		2.7%
2020	88		14.3%
U.S. Decennial Census

=== 2010 census ===
As of the census of 2010, there were 77 people, 37 households, and 24 families living in the city. The population density was 69.4 inhabitants per square mile (26.8/km^{2}). There were 44 housing units at an average density of 39.6 per square mile (15.3/km^{2}). The racial makeup of the city was 98.7% White and 1.3% Native American.

There were 37 households, of which 18.9% had children under the age of 18 living with them, 54.1% were married couples living together, 8.1% had a female householder with no husband present, 2.7% had a male householder with no wife present, and 35.1% were non-families. 29.7% of all households were made up of individuals. The average household size was 2.08 and the average family size was 2.50.

The median age in the city was 50.8 years. 15.6% of residents were under the age of 18; 5.2% were between the ages of 18 and 24; 19.5% were from 25 to 44; 50.7% were from 45 to 64; and 9.1% were 65 years of age or older. The gender makeup of the city was 49.4% male and 50.6% female.

=== 2000 census ===
As of the census of 2000, there were 75 people, 34 households, and 19 families living in the city. The population density was 67.2 inhabitants per square mile (25.9/km^{2}). There were 38 housing units at an average density of 34.0 per square mile (13.1/km^{2}). The racial makeup of the city was 100.00% White.

There were 34 households, of which 29.4% had children under the age of 18 living with them, 52.9% were married couples living together, 5.9% had a female householder with no husband present, and 41.2% were non-families. 26.5% of all households were made up of individuals, and 5.9% had someone living alone who was 65 years of age or older. The average household size was 2.21 and the average family size was 2.70.

In the city, the population was spread out, with 22.7% under the age of 18, 4.0% from 18 to 24, 34.7% from 25 to 44, 28.0% from 45 to 64, and 10.7% who were 65 years of age or older. The median age was 38 years. For every 100 females, there were 92.3 males. For every 100 females age 18 and over, there were 100.0 males.

The median income for a household in the city was $38,333, and the median income for a family was $68,750. Males had a median income of $18,750 versus $14,750 for females. The per capita income for the city was $22,102. There were no families and 3.3% of the population living below the poverty line, including no under eighteens and none of those over 64.
