= Charles Paul Wilp =

German artist, photographer and film editor (1932–2005)

Charles Paul Wilp (15 September 1932, in Witten – 2 January 2005, in Düsseldorf) was a German advertising-designer, artist, photographer and short-movie-editor.

== Study and career ==
After school at the humanistic Ruhr-high school and after studying at the Jesuit-father François Xavier in Vannes, Wilp went to the Académie de la Grande Chaumière in Paris. He completed his wide-ranging education at the TH Aachen in synaesthesia, journalism, art and psychology. He was also student of Man Ray in New York.

Wilp developed a few of the most important advertisement campaigns of the 1960s and 1970s: Puschkin („Wodka für harte Männer“, 1963), Pirelli and Volkswagen (VW-Käfer-Slogan: „Und läuft ... und läuft ... und läuft“). He was also an image consultant for major politicians, like Willy Brandt.

== Aerospace and art ==
In 1960, Yves Klein declared Wilp as Prince of Space. Wilp's interest in aerospace influenced also his most famous campaign in 1968 for the soft drink Afri-Cola, Slogan: „Super-sexy-mini-flower-pop-op-cola – alles ist in Afri-Cola“

Famous models of 1960s like Marianne Faithfull, Amanda Lear, Donna Summer, Marsha Hunt were photographed behind windows with ice-crystals.

== Artist's friends ==
The art-book "Dazzledorf" (which presents in its subtitle the town of Düsseldorf as suburb of the world) with samples also of a few of his artists-friends like Ewald Mataré, Yves Klein, Andy Warhol, Mel Ramos, Otto Piene, Heinz Mack, Günther Uecker, Joseph Beuys gives a good impression of the art and style of this artist. Wilp also had contact with the artists Michael (Mike) Jansen, Helmut Tollmann and Joe Brockerhoff.

== Exhibitions ==
- In 2008, the exhibition Zero G. The Artronaut Charles Wilp took place at the Braunschweig University of Fine Arts. It was curated by Marie-Luise Heuser, Annette Tietenberg, and Ingrid Schmidt-Winkeler. Accompanying the exhibition was the scientific and interdisciplinary conference Planetary Perspectives. The contributions were pubhished.
- In 2010, in the lecture series Culture and Spaceflight at the Haus der Wissenschaft Braunschweig, the Director of Solar System Research at ESA/ESAC in Madrid and manager of the Rosetta Mission, Gerhard Schwehm, spoke about The Importance of Art in Spaceflight - Charles Wilp.
- In his native town of Witten, a museum with his works was set up in 2012 under the name Charles Wilp Space in a disused pump house of the local waterworks. The exterior eye-catcher was a Futuro, like the one Wilp used in Düsseldorf. The museum was closed a few years later and the exhibits sold and lent to various international museums.

== Collection ==
Some of his photos can be found today in Bildarchiv Preussischer Kulturbesitz, Berlin.

== Literature ==
Wilp, Charles, Dazzledorf. Photography and texts by Charles Wilp. (texts German, English, Japanese, Arabian)o.J. Wilp, Charles, Bundeskanzleramt. Inter Nationes, Bonn 1970, Wilp, Charles, Wilp-Girl 70 : Charles Wilp present 12 Playgirls aus 5 Kontinenten

== Works ==
- Konsumrealismus, Documenta 5 in Kassel, 1972
- Kunstblätter „Blick aus dem All“, 26. April bis 6. Mai 1993 in Oberpfaffenhofen (aerospace-mission D2)

== Film-documentation ==
- Der gelbe Wellenmacher. German TV-documentation by Klaus Peter Dencker, ARD 1977
- monks - the transatlantic feedback. A documentary film about Wilp's collaboration with the first avant-garde pop band The Monks, USA/Germany/Spain 2006

== Discography ==
- Prince Of Space, Musik Der Leere - (1965, Sight & Sound Production), with Yves Klein
- Charles Wilp Fotografiert Bunny - (1965, Ata Tak)
- Michelangelo In Space - The Bunny Remixes - (2000, Ata Tak)
