= Jimmy Bowien =

German-born record producer (born 1933)

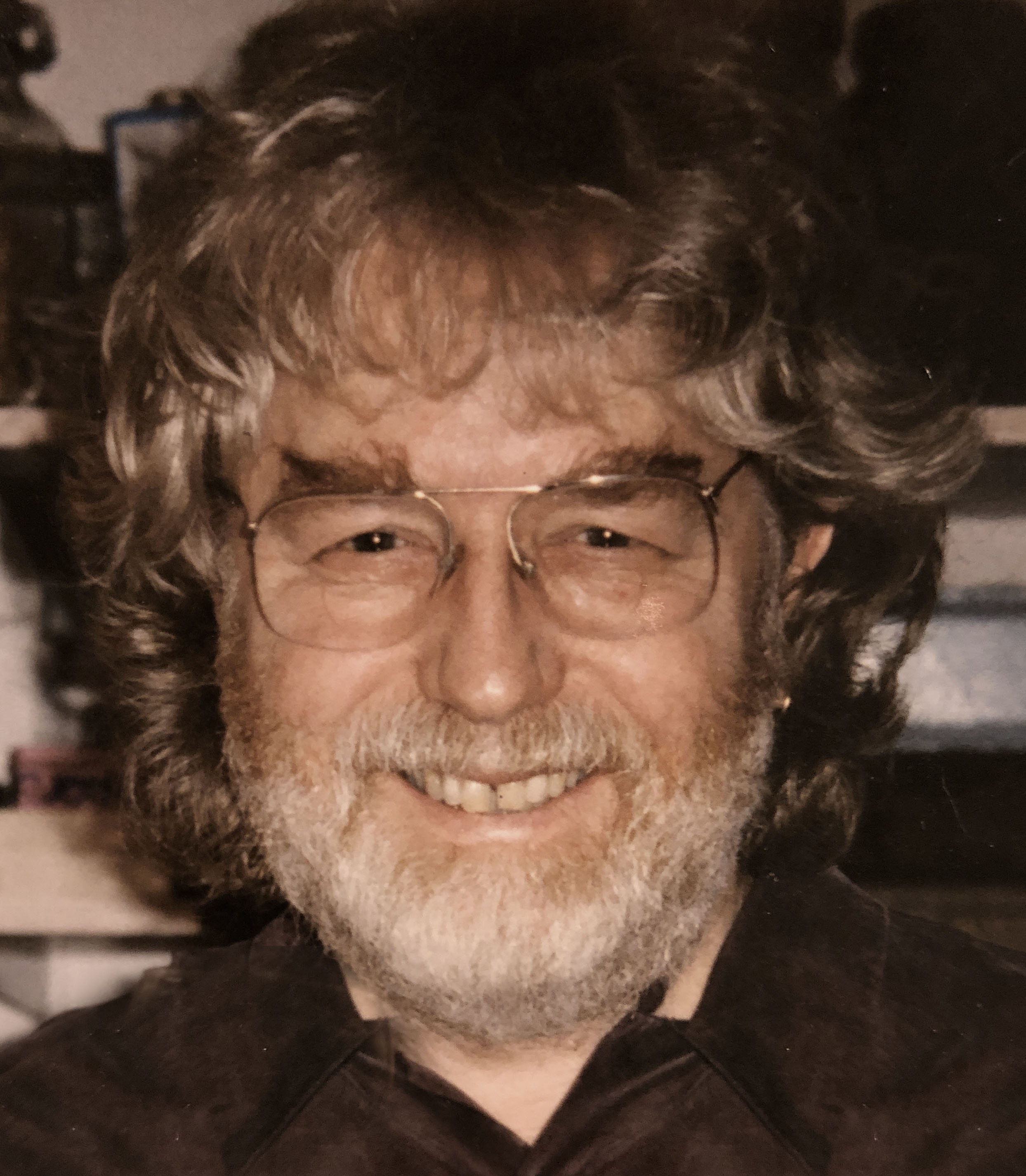
- Jimmy Bowien

Background information
- Also known as: Kim Philipp (artist name)
- Born: 5 February 1933; Prussia
- Genres: Musicals, Pop music, Orchestral Works
- Occupation(s): Record producer, songwriter and composer.
- Instrument(s): Piano, Guitar, Vocals (Baritone)
- Years active: 1958–2000
- Labels: Polydor, Deutsche Grammophon

Jimmy Bowien (born 5 February 1933) is a record producer, songwriter and composer.

== Life and career ==
Bowien started playing the piano at the age of 5 and studied classical music to become a professional opera singer (Baritone). After graduating in Hamburg-Germany he worked with the record label Polydor writing advertising copies and created a repertoire of musical compositions. In 1959, Bowien started to discover new talents and produced records for Polydor with such artists as The Monks and Tony Sheridan, who was playing with The Beatles (aka The Beat Brothers).

Bowien is a multi-recipient of gold and platinum records and is best known for discovering new artists, composing music and producing records for Olivia Newton-John, Daliah Lavi, The Monks and Georges Moustaki. He produced such Musicals as Cats, Phantom of the Opera, Les Miserable, A Chorus Line and Mozart.

== See also ==
Jimmy Bowien is likely to be the first record producer to take interest in The Beatles.

The Monks: The transatlantic Feedback.

Black Monk Time – Producer Jimmy Bowien.

The Monks entered the studio with a young producer named Jimmy Bowien.

Musical: Cats (Best Of Musical 2004).

Musical: Andrew Lloyd Webber – The Phantom of the Opera (German Language Version).

== Musicals ==
- Cats (musical) (1984 Vienna)
- The Phantom of the Opera (1986 musical) (Vienna)
- Les Misérables (musical) (Vienna)
- Elisabeth (Vienna)
- Mozart( Vienna)
- La Cage aux Folles (Berlin, with Helmut Baumann)
- Little Shop Of Horrors (Berlin)
- Linie 1 – (Berlin)
- Marlene – (Berlin)
- Käpt'n Bay-Bay – (Hamburg)

== Producer of Artists ==
- Tony Sheridan
- The Monks
- Olivia Newton-John
- Franz Josef Degenhardt
- Daliah Lavi
- Horst Jankowski Chor
- Horst Wende Orchestra
- Ilja Richter
- Roberto Delgado
- Antonia Maas
- Margot Hielscher
- Swetlana
- Conchita Bautista
- Reinhard Mey
- Eva-Maria Ihloff
- Die Tramps
- Nicos Apostolidis
- Knut Kiesewetter
- George Mavros
- Die drei Kiesewetters
- Albatros
- Eve Morris
- Terry Jacks
- Peter Stainbank
- Tina /Irland
- Helmuth Zacharias
- Adolf Scherbaum
- Tony Maier
- Peter Igelhoff
- Thaddaeus Troll
- Milan, Paul und Ela
- Rolf Kühn
- Max Greger
- Betty Jurkowicz
- Aase Kleveland
- Gene Pitney
- Igal Bashan
- David Rose
- Boaz Sharabi
- Wolfram Ilanit
- Peter Roland und Schobert Schulz
- Melina Mercouri
- Hai und Topsy
- Shirley und Colin
- Barry Ryan und Paul Ryan
- Ralf Schwendter
- Peter Horton
- Ladi Geisler
- Margot Werner
- die Scandias
- Cambridge Buskers
- Die Tonics
- Keith Barry
- Countdown
- Max Greger Jr.
- Les Copains
- Élizabeth Teissier
- Candy Floss
- Horea Crishan
- Evans-Sisters
- Katja Schimmelpfennig
- Kajetan
- The Big Six
- Holger Biege
- Gilian Scalici
- Peter Sauer
- Angelika Milster
- The Shamrocks
- Steve Barton
- Die Yankees
- Gabriele Sutter
- Spiritual-Chor Hamburg
- Freddy Quinn
- Old Merrytale Jazzband
- Günter Strack
- Linda Laine and the Sinners
- Karel Gott
- Los Amigos del Amambay
- Heidi Brühl
- Britta Martell
- Milva
- Tatjana Seyffert
- Nils Tuxen
- Die Tanztempel Ritter
- Uwe Kroeger
