= Monks: The Transatlantic Feedback =

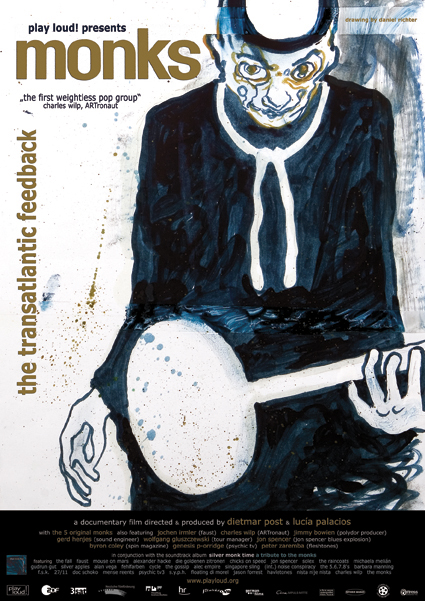
- Promotional poster by Daniel Richter
- Directed by: Dietmar Post and Lucia Palacios
- Produced by: Dietmar Post and Lucia Palacios for Play Loud! Productions
- Cinematography: Dietmar Post, Lucia Palacios, Renato Falcao
- Edited by: Dieter Jaufmann; Karl-W. Huelsenbeck
- Music by: The Monks
- Distributed by: Play Loud! Productions
- Release date: October 23, 2006 (Berlin Volksbühne)
- Running time: 100 minutes
- Countries: United States; Germany; Spain
- Languages: English, German

Monks: The Transatlantic Feedback is a 2006 film directed by Dietmar Post and Lucia Palacios about the seminal German-American beat band the Monks. The film was produced by Play Loud! Productions and shot on location in the US and Germany between 1997 and 2002. In 2008 the filmmakers obtained the German TV Oscar, the Adolf Grimme Award.

== Cast ==
- Gary Burger as Himself
- Dave Day as Himself
- Larry Clark as Himself
- Roger Johnston as Himself
- Eddie Shaw as Himself
- Hans-Joachim Irmler as Himself
- Jon Spencer as Himself
- Charles Paul Wilp as Himself
- Genesis P-Orridge as H/erself
- Jimmy Bowien as Himself
- Gerd Henjes as Himself
- Wolfgang Gluszczewski as Himself
- Byron Coley as Himself
- Uschi Nerke as Herself (archive footage)
- Mal Sondock as Himself (archive footage)

== Synopsis ==
Jake Austen for Time Out described the film as follows:

After the Beatles conquered the world, America responded with the Monkees, a friendlier version playing Brill Building hits. Inversely, in Germany, a pair of avant-garde geniuses (Walther Niemann and Karl-H. Remy) conceptualized the Monks, a group of bizarre anti-Beatles who would write their own dark minimalist rock. The gifted band, a group of five Americans who had recently finished their U.S. military service at a German base, had honed its skills by playing up to 40 hours a week in the same beat clubs that provided the Beatles' training. The musicians' new managers dressed them in black, shaved their heads like monks, provided them with a series of manifestos, and coached them to reconfigure their band to feature tribal drumming, feedback and electric banjo. Somehow, this resulted in one of the greatest albums in rock history. Despite experimenting with minimalism, tension and antipop sensibilities (backup vocals are sung in creepy unison instead of sweet harmony), the record is danceable and joyous.

One of the most fascinating aspects of the film is seeing the five contemporary monks discussing the history they had all buried upon returning to America in 1967, after the band's dissolution. Larry Clark, the Chicago-bred R&B keyboardist, won't allow himself to attach any significance to his work with the monks. Absurdly, of the five articulate interviewees, only guitarist and lead singer Gary Burger is willing to attribute political significance to the Vietnam lyrics in their theme song. With this lack of singular vision, it's not surprising that the filmmakers framed their story by focusing on the conceptualists' vision.

== Critical reception ==
The film was well received by critics. Chris Morris of The Hollywood Reporter named it a "penetrating and loving documentary". Dennis Harvey of Variety praised that "Helmers do a vivid job etching the creatively fervid times, with an editing style whose dynamism echoes that of Monk music". New York critic and John Cage expert Richard Kostelanetz compared it with the documentary film Comedian Harmonists (1976) by Eberhard Fechner: "Monks: The Transatlantic Feedback vividly recalls several American military veterans who in the early 1960s formed in Germany a short-lived proto-punk rock group calling themselves the Monks (and cutting their hair appropriately). Much like Eberhard Fechner's great documentary about the Comedian Harmonists, the film, through individual interviews made decades later, neatly documents not just how they came together and fell apart, but the remarkable performances they did in between. This film is moving, informative, and unforgettable."

== Aftermath ==
In conjunction with the film play loud! productions initiated a double CD tribute record by the title Silver Monk Time – a tribute to the Monks. This record served as financial support to the film and was released officially on October 23, 2006, at the famous Volksbühne in Berlin (Germany). At the same event the film was premiered to a full house. play loud! also had invited Monks and some special guests from Silver Monk Time. For Monks, it was their first live performance in Germany for almost 40 years. After the film screening, Monks were received with standing ovations by a frenetic audience. Special guest musicians Mark E. Smith (The Fall), The Raincoats, Schorsch Kamerun (Goldenen Zitronen) and Peter Hein (Fehlfarben) celebrated together with Monks their comeback. Among the audience were also some of the old collaborators, such as Walther Niemann, Wolfgang Gluszczewski and Jimmy Bowien.

Since the completion of filming in 2002 seven of the film's protagonists have died:

- In 2004 Roger Johnston, the drummer of Monks.
- In 2005 Charles Paul Wilp, who tried to convince Monks to perform his outstanding music for Afri Cola.
- In 2008 Dave Day Havlicek, the banjo player of Monks.
- In 2009 Walther Niemann, the co-inventor and creative manager of Monks.
- In 2009 Wolfgang Gluszczewski, the booking agent of Monks.
- In 2014 Gary Burger, the lead singer and guitarist of Monks
- In 2022 Jimmy Bowien, the Polydor producer of Monks

== Awards ==
- 2006 – Leeds Film Festival (Audience Pick)
- 2006 – Hessischer Filmpreis (Nomination for Best Documentary)
- 2007 – San Francisco Berlin & Beyond Festival (2. Audience Award)
- 2007 – Würzburger Filmtage (Audience Award Best Documentary)
- 2007 – Milan Doc Festival (Best Editing)
- 2008 – Adolf Grimme Award (Best Directing and Best Script)

== DVD release ==
A DVD of the film was released on March 13, 2009. It included full videos of the 1960s German TV performances as a bonus feature. Because of the underground success of the documentary film Universal (Polydor) re-issued Black Monk Time on vinyl and CD. Play Loud! Productions re-issued the 1966 single "Complication" b/w "Oh-How to Do Now".
