= Gary Burger =

- Born: June 7, 1942
- Died: March 14, 2014 (age 71) Turtle River, Minnesota
- Genres: Proto-punk, garage rock
- Instrument(s): Guitar, vocals
- Years active: 1964–2014
- Labels: Polydor

Gary Burger (June 7, 1942 – March 14, 2014) was an American musician, best known as the guitarist and vocalist for the rock band the Monks.

== Biography ==
Burger joined the U.S. Army immediately after graduating from Bemidji High School in Bemidji, Minnesota, and was stationed in Gelnhausen, West Germany. Burger formed the Five Torquays in 1964 with four other American soldiers he met in Germany. According to him, he joined the band partially because it got him out of his regular job as a fuel truck driver. The Torquays mainly played in hospitals and nursing homes in the beginning and produced a single in a small studio in Heidelberg. Their repertoire consisted mainly of Chuck Berry covers before moving on to more avant-garde original material.

A group of German students noticed the band and agreed to manage them if they changed their outfits. The band all wore black cassocks, nooses around their necks, and shaved the top of their heads. By 1965 the Five Torquays had become the Monks. They recorded one album, 1966's Black Monk Time. Although the Monks met with little success during their tenure, they were later cited as an influence on various artists, ranging from Jack White to The Fall. Burger's voice was described by Sean O'Neal as "a yowl that was soulful in its own strangled-cat sort of way." After touring Europe for three years, the Monks broke up in 1967.

After the breakup, Burger moved back to Minnesota and enrolled at Bemidji State University on a G.I. Bill scholarship. He found work digging septic systems by hand. "I loved that job, down in a hole with a shovel," he said. The Minnesota Department of Natural Resources later hired Burger to create films and advertisements. He opened a small recording studio that serviced the northern Minnesota music scene. In November 1999, Burger reunited with his former Monks bandmates to play a reunion show in New York City after learning copies of Black Monk Time had become collector's items.

Burger was elected mayor of Turtle River, Minnesota, in 2006. In 2009, he reflected on his time in the Monks: "We all knew that we were doing a different sort of music, but as far as being a forerunner band—that was the furthest from our minds. We really weren’t thinking that. We had no idea that we were creating a new movement. And I’m still thinking, hey, we were just a rock and roll band that really had a lot of fun, and was able to be lucky enough—or unlucky enough, depending on your point of view—to work on the album."

Burger died of pancreatic cancer in Turtle River on March 14, 2014, at the age of 71.
