= Mark Pirro =

American musician (born 1970)

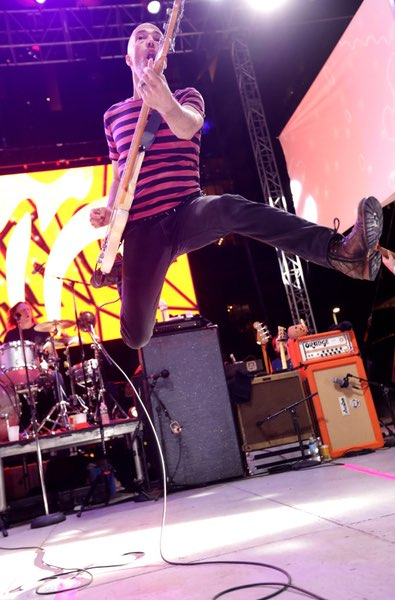
- Mark Pirro performing with Tripping Daisy 2017

Background information
- Born: July 1, 1970 (age 55)
- Origin: Cleveland, Ohio, United States
- Genres: Alternative rock, symphonic rock
- Occupation(s): Musician, audio engineer, record producer, inventor
- Instrument(s): Bass guitar, vocals
- Years active: 1989–present
- Labels: Island, Hollywood, Good, Kirtland, MCA, Columbia, TVT, and Beggars Banquet
- Website: placidaudio.com

Mark Pirro (born July 1, 1970) is an American musician (bass guitar), audio engineer, and record producer based in Dallas, Texas. He is a founding member of Tripping Daisy, an alternative rock band that was active from 1991 to 1999. He is an original and current performing member of The Polyphonic Spree, and also performed with the groups Menkena and Foreign Fires. Pirro is the inventor of the Copperphone, a specialty microphone that he designed and distributes through his company Placid Audio.

== Career ==
Pirro is a founding member of Tripping Daisy along with vocalist Tim DeLaughter and guitarist and pianist Wes Berggren. The group released its first album Bill in 1992 on the independent label Dragon Street Records. It later signed with Island Records where it released the album I am An Elastic Firecracker in 1995 and Jesus Hits Like The Atom Bomb in 1998. The group's song I Got A Girl made it to number 6 on Billboard's alternative rock chart. Pirro performed with Tripping Daisy on Late Night with Conan O'Brien in 1993 as well as supported Def Leppard during the North American portion of the Slang World Tour. Pirro played with the group until 1999 after the death of Berggren. Pirro and the remaining members completed the group's fourth album after Berggren's death and released it under its own record label, Good Records.

Pirro went on to join The Polyphonic Spree, a choral symphonic rock band formed by DeLaughter in 2000. The 25 member group includes two keyboardists, a harpist, and a 10-person choir. As part of the group, Pirro has toured with David Bowie, played at a Nobel Peace Prize ceremony, been on the MTV Video Music Awards, and performed Sgt. Pepper's Lonely Hearts Club Band in front of former Beatles' producer George Martin. Additional appearances including performing with Paul Rodgers and the remaining members of Queen during Queen's 2004 induction ceremony into the UK Rock and Roll Hall of Fame. He has toured internationally with The Polyphonic Spree throughout the United States, Europe, Japan, Australia, Canada, and Uganda. He also appeared with the group in the 2015 film The Big Short, as well as on the soundtrack to the movie.

Pirro is the inventor of the Copperphone, a hand crafted microphone designed and built through his company Placid Audio. The Copperphone uses components from vintage communications equipment as well as a mechanical filtering device to achieve a limited bandwidth frequency response similar to that of AM radio and the nostalgic sound of the early days of recording. He designed the first Copperphone while playing with The Polyphonic Spree, as a way to produce a "telephone" voice effect for lead singer DeLeaughter. The Copperphone has been used by many artists, including Green Day, Queens of the Stone Age, Lou Barlow, Rush, Norah Jones, Jack White, St. Vincent, as well as Grammy Winning producer Jacquire King.

Pirro has been known to use instruments, software and effects from Musicvox, iZotope, FEA Labs, and Waterstone Guitars.

=== Discography ===
Year	Title	Role	Notes
2013	Songs from the Rocky Horror Picture Show: Live in London	Group Member	Recorded as a group member of The Polyphonic Spree
2013	Yes, It's True	Bass Guitar	Recorded as a group member of The Polyphonic Spree
2012	Holidaydream: Sounds of the Holidays, Vol. One	Engineer, Bass Guitar, Tambourine	Recorded as a group member of The Polyphonic Spree
2012	Rubble Guts & BB Eye	Engineer and vocal	Album from the group Preteen Zenith
2010	Disconnect from Desire	Engineer	School of Seven Bells
2009	Chlorine Colored Eyes	Noise	The Crash That Took Me
2009	WeeSee	Engineering and mixing	Children's audio/visual project by Rolyn Barthelman with original score by Polyphonic Spree singer Tim Delaughter
2008	Nightmare Revisited	Bass	Played on Town Meeting Song as a group member of The Polyphonic Spree
2008	Visioneers	Bass, Engineer, Mixer	Soundtrack to movie Visioneers
2007	Live from Austin TX	Bass, Bass Instrument, Member of Attributed Artist	Recorded as a group member of The Polyphonic Spree
2007	Marry Me	Bass, Main Personnel	St. Vincent
2007	SXSW Live 2007	Bass, Vocals	A compilation featuring an original song from The Polyphonic Spree ("When the Fool Becomes King")
2007	The Fragile Army	Bass, Engineer	Recorded as a group member of The Polyphonic Spree
2006	I Like U	Engineer, Mixing producer	Black Tie Dynasty
2005	Thumbsucker	Bass, Engineer, Acoustic Guitar, Mixing	Recorded as a group member of The Polyphonic Spree
2005	Murderball	Bass	Played as a member of The Polyphonic Spree on the track Light & Day
2004	Eternal Sunshine of the Spotless Mind	Bass	Played with The Polyphonic Spree on songs It's the Sun and Light & Day
2004	Together We're Heavy	Bass, Member of Attributed Artist	Recorded as a group member of The Polyphonic Spree
2003	Wig in a Box	Bass, Mixing	A compilation featuring a song from the movie soundtrack performed by The Polyphonic Spree ("Wig in a Box")
2002	The Beginning Stages of the Polyphonic Spree	Bass, Vocals	Recorded as a group member of The Polyphonic Spree
2002	We're Birds	Engineer, Producer, Vocals	El Gato
2000	Tripping Daisy	Bass, Vocals	Recorded as a group member of Tripping Daisy
1998	Jesus Hits Like the Atom Bomb	Bass, Vocals, Percussion	Recorded as a group member of Tripping Daisy
1998	Popaganda	Producer	A compilation featuring an original song from Tripping Daisy ("Cartoon Bikini")
1997	Come on Feel the Metal	Bass	A compilation featuring a song by Judas Priest performed by Tripping Daisy - ("Electric Eye")
1996	The Craft	Bass	A movie soundtrack compilation featuring a song by Harry Nilsson performed by Tripping Daisy - ("Jump Into The Fire")
1995	I Am an Elastic Firecracker	Bass	Recorded as a group member of Tripping Daisy
1995	Saturday Morning: Cartoons' Greatest Hits	Bass	A compilation featuring a song by Bobby Hart / Danny Janssen performed by Tripping Daisy - ("Friends/Sigmund and the Seamonsters")
1994	Get It On	Bass	Recorded as a group member of Tripping Daisy
1992	Bill	Bass	Recorded as a group member of Tripping Daisy
