= Jesus Hits Like the Atom Bomb =

Studio album by Tripping Daisy
- Released: July 7, 1998
- Recorded: October–December 1997
- Studio: Dreamland (Hurley, New York)
- Genre: Alternative rock; art rock; neo-psychedelia
- Length: 57:10
- Label: Island
- Producer: Eric Drew Feldman

Tripping Daisy chronology
Time Capsule (1997)	Jesus Hits Like the Atom Bomb (1998)	The Tops Off Our Head (1999)

Tripping Daisy studio album chronology
I Am an Elastic Firecracker (1995)	Jesus Hits Like the Atom Bomb (1998)	Tripping Daisy (2000)

Singles from Jesus Hits Like the Atom Bomb
- 1. "Waited a Light Year" Released: June 22, 1998; 2. "Sonic Bloom" Released: September 1998

Jesus Hits Like the Atom Bomb is the third studio album by American rock band Tripping Daisy, released on July 7, 1998, through Island Records. It was the band's first album to be recorded with guitarist Phil Karnats and drummer Benjamin Curtis, and was the band's last album to be released during guitarist Wes Berggren's lifetime. Produced by Eric Drew Feldman, the album is a stylistic departure from the band's previous work, showcasing a more artistic sound that is underpinned by pop sensibilities. The album also features a significant amount of experimentation with its guitars, vocals and instrumentation.

A few months prior to the release of Jesus Hits Like the Atom Bomb, Island Records' parent company was involved in a major corporate merger, which negatively affected the album's promotional campaign. The album failed to meet sales expectations; neither it nor its singles charted, resulting in Island Records ending its contract with Tripping Daisy two months after its release. Despite this, critics gave Jesus Hits Like the Atom Bomb mostly positive reviews, praising its improved musicianship and songwriting. The album is now regarded as the band's best work, and has been viewed as a precursor to Tim DeLaughter's next project The Polyphonic Spree.

== Background ==
In June 1995, Tripping Daisy issued their second album I Am an Elastic Firecracker, which includes the hit single "I Got a Girl". The album was a moderate commercial success, reaching number 95 on the US Billboard 200 chart, and also appeared on several charts worldwide. The band, however, faced numerous difficulties during this period; after a tour of the United States, drummer Bryan Wakeland left the band in February 1996 due to creative differences. He was replaced by Mitch Marine, who performed with the band during a poorly received supporting tour with Def Leppard throughout 1996. In time, Marine proved to be an "even worse [musical] partnership" than Wakeland. Sales of I Am an Elastic Firecracker were not as high as the band and Island Records hoped; it had sold 300,000 copies by 1998.

Tripping Daisy, who were exhausted from touring for six-and-a-half years, went on an extended hiatus for most of 1997 and nearly split up. The band's frontman, Tim DeLaughter, had also become increasingly disillusioned with the music industry, and felt that Island Records were trying to change the band's focus away from their music and towards album and singles sales. After experiencing a spiritual awakening telling him he "was capable of doing anything [he] had envisioned", DeLaughter returned to writing new material for Tripping Daisy. While working on music, DeLaughter met guitarist and trumpeter Phil Karnats; the two connected musically and began working on a side project called The Platinum Experience, with DeLaughter on drums and Karnats on guitar. Tripping Daisy guitarist Wes Berggen later joined The Platinum Experience playing keyboards, and later, all three members were playing guitar. Karnats was soon asked to join Tripping Daisy for a tour of Texas in mid-1997, and in June of that year, he was made an official member of the band, which became a quintet.

== Recording and production ==
Prior to the recording of Jesus Hits Like the Atom Bomb, Tripping Daisy sent a demo tape of their new material to producer Eric Drew Feldman. Tim DeLaughter became interested in working with Feldman after hearing his work producing Deus's album In a Bar, Under the Sea (1996): according to DeLaughter, "Sounds I heard on the Deus record were part of a world we wanted to be able to play in". Although they did not expect Feldman to respond, he agreed to produce the band's next album.

On October 7, 1997, the day on which the band were scheduled to travel to Dreamland Recording Studios in Hurley, New York, the band fired Mitch Marine. "Mitch's drums were loaded up in the trailer and we were getting ready to leave ... But we just couldn't go and make a record with a group of people who weren't right", DeLaughter said. The band commenced recording at Dreamland with Feldman and engineer Andy Baker, who also worked on I Am an Elastic Firecracker, on October 10, 1997. After spending two weeks residing in Woodstock—without a drummer—the band contacted UFOFU drummer Benjamin Curtis and asked him to play on the record. Curtis arrived at Dreamland on October 19, 1997, and immediately started recording drum tracks for the album's partially completed songs. Curtis related to the rest of the band better than he expected, and became an equal partner in the album's songwriting process. Curtis found the experience recording with Tripping Daisy to be "really positive" and "a relief" following UFOFU's acrimonious breakup that year, and on November 4, 1997, he was made a permanent member of the band. Tripping Daisy collectively wrote and recorded around 20 songs at Dreamland for Jesus Hits Like the Atom Bomb, five of which were written at the studio. According to DeLaughter:

The way we came into the best sounds was by pure accident ... All mistakes were welcomed. We recorded this stuff live and just decided to step out and try lots of different things. When you have people who test the bounds of sound, this is what you get.

Feldman gave Tripping Daisy an unprecedented amount of creative freedom during the recording of Jesus Hits Like the Atom Bomb, and he encouraged the band to try out new ideas in the studio. According to DeLaughter; "He likes to experiment and then go into the experiment even further, and before you know it, you're crafting [an innovative] record ... His whole thing was, 'Just make sure I have plenty of tape so you can do anything you want to and there's no pressure' ". Feldman insisted recordings that contained mistakes and missed notes were to be left intact, often responding to the band's requests to re-record takes with "No way. That’s awesome." The band deliberately interfered with Wes Berggen's guitar knobs and timing while he was recording takes to create " 'anything goes' noise", which the band later integrated into the album's tracks, giving the album a raw, "scruffy and unpredictable" mix. The band also experimented with various instruments on Jesus Hits Like the Atom Bomb with the use of xylophone, mellotron and cello, as well as various keyboard instruments—including Korg synthesizers, a Wurlitzer organ, a Yamaha CP-70, an organ that belonged to DeLaughters' mother-in-law, and an Ace Tone organ. Trumpets are also featured in some of the album's tracks, performed by Karnats.

Island Records did not interfere with the recording sessions of Jesus Hits Like the Atom Bomb. Previously, during the recording of I Am an Elastic Firecracker, the company's A&R representatives pressured Tripping Daisy to produce more commercial-sounding material, likely in response to the poor performance of the label's 1993 re-release of the band's debut album Bill, which was expected to be an immediate success. DeLaughter attributed Island's lack of interference to the departures of A&R executive Rose Noone and Island Records founder Chris Blackwell in 1996 and 1997, respectively. DeLaughter said:

We had nobody from the record company disturbing us ... It was basically, 'Here's the money, make a record, we won't bug you'. We were a victim of circumstances that out [sic] in our favor. It's the only way to make a record: no one to fuck with you. There was no second-guessing.

Recording sessions for Jesus Hits Like the Atom Bomb concluded in December 1997 and the band returned to Texas just before Christmas. Feldman and Baker mixed the album at Compass Point Studios in The Bahamas in January 1998. The band was extremely proud of the album; bassist Mark Pirro called it "the best we've been so far" and DeLaughter said he had "finally made a record and been a part of something that [he'd] wanted to achieve for a long time".

== Composition ==
Jesus Hits Like the Atom Bomb has been described as alternative rock, art rock and neo-psychedelia. The Austin Chronicle labeled the album "space pop", whilst AllMusic described it as "[balancing] punk-pop with art-rock". The album is a departure from the grunge-oriented sound of Tripping Daisy's previous releases Bill and I Am an Elastic Firecracker; it embraces a variety of musical styles whilst displaying pop music influences throughout. The album's sound was compared to the works of bands such as Jane's Addiction, Built to Spill, and The Flaming Lips, as well as to The Beatles' Sgt. Pepper's Lonely Hearts Club Band.

DeLaughter envisioned Jesus Hits Like the Atom Bomb as an artistic statement that challenged and rejected modern-day radio, which he saw as "formulated and predictable", and the pressures from Island the band had faced with I Am an Elastic Firecracker. He also considered Jesus Hits Like the Atom Bomb to be "the most honest record coming out in the last few years", and felt the album's openly flawed nature gives it a quality of "truth". Island's then-CEO Davitt Sigerson described Jesus Hits Like the Atom Bomb as "more epic and more emotionally connecting" than Tripping Daisy's earlier works.

FMQB described "Waited a Light Year" as "an adventurous pocket symphony" that "uses three distinctly different musical movements that culminate in a blinding wall of noise". "Sonic Bloom" is a psychedelic pop ballad about "the joy and wide-eyed amazement of finding, falling and feeling love". Some of the album's tracks exhibit a punk rock influence; "Mechanical Breakdown" was described as "neo-futuristic" and pop-punk, while "8 Ladies" features off-kilter, post-punk riffs in the vein of Shudder to Think. "Our Drive to the Sun / Can a Man Mark It?" and "Tiny Men" echo the band's early, melodic sound found on Bill. The album's final track "Indian Poker Pt. 2 & 3" is a combined cover of the songs "Indian Poker (Part 2)" and "Indian Poker (Part 3)" by the indie rock band Brainiac, from their album Hissing Prigs in Static Couture (1996); the track was dedicated to Brainiac's lead singer Timmy Taylor, who was killed in a car accident in May 1997, in Jesus Hits Like the Atom Bomb's liner notes.

Tim DeLaughter's lyrics were described as dense and often cryptic; Pitchfork described the lyrics as "[coming] straight off of Robert Pollard's Guided By Voices lyricpad". His vocal performances were compared to those of The Flaming Lips' lead singer Wayne Coyne, and the use of reverb and distortion effects on his vocals was also noted by critics. Feldman permitted DeLaughter to apply extensive overdubbing and harmonization to his and his bandmates' vocals in an attempt to create more melody; he had attempted to do this on Tripping Daisy's previous albums but the producers he worked with thought it was annoying. The album's vocal harmonies were compared to those of The Beach Boys.

Tim DeLaughter derived the album's title from a greatest hits record by the Pilgrim Travelers he found in the studio; he said: "One of the songs on there was 'Jesus Hits Like The Atom Bomb'. Something went through me like a bolt of lightening, and we were all saying, 'That's It! That says everything we're feeling about this record.' " DeLaughter also chose the album's title because it "meant something as broad as my thoughts, to embrace this record that I thought was heavy". The album was originally titled Guts but the title was changed after it was discovered fellow Island Records artist John Cale had released a compilation album under that name in 1977.

== Release and promotion ==
Executives at Island Records responded enthusiastically to Jesus Hits Like the Atom Bomb when presented with the album. According to Tim DeLaughter: "When we brought this record in to them, they were completely flabbergasted—floored! We played it for him, for Davitt [Sigerson], and he was like, 'My God! We had no idea you were doing this.' " Speaking to the Dallas Observer shortly before the album's release, Sigerson predicted the album would sell at least 500,000 copies in the United States, and possibly one million copies by the end of 1998 to become Platinum-certified. If it did not meet his expectations, he stated he was not worried about the album's commercial performance, saying: "If this record were to sell fewer copies [than 500,000], I wouldn't say I was wrong about it. I can't have remorse about it. It won't make me love it any less." Island Records hoped to promote Tripping Daisy and Jesus Hits Like the Atom Bomb with a "born-again marketing push" that was designed to help build the band's credibility and create a new fanbase; this would have included giving DeLaughter thousands of dollars to produce a film about the album. The band also obtained greater control over the album's publicity by using the New York-based firm Kathy Schenker Associates rather than Island's in-house publicists. Tripping Daisy did not take any touring advances from Island to reduce their liabilities with the label.

Jesus Hits Like the Atom Bomb was released in the United States and Canada on July 7, 1998, and in the United Kingdom on July 27. Island Records wanted to issue "Sonic Bloom" as the album's first single but the band insisted on releasing "Waited a Light Year" instead; the label issued the single to radio stations on June 22, 1998. The decision to release "Waited a Light Year" as a single was seen as a risky move for the band due to its six-minute runtime—although a four-minute radio edit was also provided—and the fact there were more accessible songs on the album. DeLaughter stated the band decided to release the single as a rejection of mainstream radio and to dissuade listeners from perceiving Tripping Daisy as one-hit wonders due to "I Got a Girl". As part of the album's promotion in the UK, Island organized a giveaway of a limited-edition 7" single of "Waited a Light Year" that featured the song on the A-side and an etching of the album's artwork on the reverse through Kerrang! magazine between August 1 and August 6, 1998. Readers could write to a mailing address to receive the single, which was limited to 1,000 copies. The single was not warmly received by radio stations. "Sonic Bloom" was later issued as the album's second single sometime in September 1998. No music videos were made for either of the album's singles, although a music video for "Sonic Bloom" was supposed to be filmed in November 1998. Neither the album or its singles charted and sales were poor. DeLaughter told the Houston Chronicle in 2017: "We felt like we were doing something special. But it just disappeared. It was dead on arrival."

Around a month before the album's release, Island's parent company PolyGram was purchased by the beverage giant Seagram for US$10.6 billion. To finance the acquisition and cut costs, Seagram decided to merge PolyGram into Universal Music Group, resulting in the loss of 3,000 PolyGram jobs. DeLaughter believed employees of Island Records at the time were more concerned about keeping their jobs than promoting music, and thus the album was not and could not be effectively promoted. In September 1998, two months after the album's release, Island chose not to renew its contract with Tripping Daisy.

Tripping Daisy toured the US and Canada in support of Jesus Hits Like the Atom Bomb during the fall of 1998. Due to the studio-based nature of the songs, the band had some difficulties translating the album's material to live shows. The band played to significantly smaller audiences during the tour; a Chicago Tribune review of one of the band's shows on September 23, 1998, noted only 200 people had attended the band's show at Metro Chicago, which had a maximum capacity of 1,400. The GW Hatchet reviewed a show at Black Cat in Washington, D.C., and reported an audience of only forty people. After the tour's conclusion, the band returned to the studio to record demos for a new album.

== Critical reception ==
Professional ratings
Review scores
Source	Rating
AllMusic	4.5/5 stars
The Austin Chronicle	2/5 stars
The Boston Phoenix	3/4 stars
Chicago Sun-Times	3/4 stars
The Encyclopedia of Popular Music	4/5 stars
Kerrang!	4/5 stars
Lancashire Telegraph	6/10
Melody Maker	3.5/5 stars
Pitchfork	8.3/10

Upon its release, Jesus Hits Like the Atom Bomb received mostly positive reviews from critics. Stephen Thomas Erlewine of AllMusic hailed the album as "a big stylistic breakthrough [for Tripping Daisy]" and praised Feldman's contributions. Ryan Schreiber of Pitchfork also applauded Tripping Daisy's growth: "Gone are the days of the saccharine, abrasive cuteness the band exploited on I Am An Elastic Firecracker and with it, any hope of being lumped alongside Deadeye Dick". Vue Weekly 's T.C. Shaw found "simply no duds" on the album and called Tripping Daisy "master tunesmiths who not only understand the absurd but the surreal as well". David Weiss of Alternative Press lauded the album's musicianship and songwriting, stating that "It would be tough to ask for more from a lo-fi pop album than what Tripping Daisy have delivered on Jesus." Johnathan Perry of The Boston Phoenix noted Karnats' and Curtis' "seamless" contributions to the band's "trippy" sound, whilst RPM's Rod Gudino said that Karnats gave the album "added firepower" and "a fifth dimension ... to experiment" with.

However, some critics found the album inconsistent in its quality and approach. Jenny Eliscu of CMJ New Music Monthly said Tripping Daisy's experimentation on the album is akin to "a kid with its first chemistry kit", producing songs of varying quality; "sometimes it creates a fascinating new concoction; other times the different parts just neutralize each other and what's left is an inchoate mess". Despite perceiving occasional "[deviations] from the 'Inspirational Pop' category into the jagged pastures of 'Art Wank Hell' ", Paul Brannigan of Kerrang! praised the album overall as a "collection of wildly imaginative tunes". The Lancashire Telegraph noted "patches of corporate rockstodge" amid the album's "engaging hotch-potch of weird and wonderful oddities". In an unfavorable review, Michael Bertin of The Austin Chronicle said the album had come three years too late to save the band's reputation, and that most of its songs lacked any staying power.

== Legacy ==
Despite its commercial failure, Jesus Hits Like the Atom Bomb was "one of the most acclaimed albums of 1998", according to MTV News. The album has since become a critical and fan favorite, and is generally regarded as Tripping Daisy's best work. In November 2003, CMJ New Music Report awarded the album a "Silver Salute", calling it a "classic College Radio album". The Dallas Observer called Jesus Hits Like the Atom Bomb "the greatest record of [Tripping Daisy]'s career" in July 2011, and later ranked "Sonic Bloom" at number 100 on their "100 Best Texas Songs" list in August 2012, praising the track as "more heartfelt than anything [the band had] done before". In a 2024 interview with D Magazine, DeLaughter called Jesus Hits Like the Atom Bomb his favourite album from Tripping Daisy's discography, citing its enjoyable recording experience and the band's songwriting developments.

Jesus Hits Like the Atom Bomb has been retrospectively viewed as a precursor to Tim DeLaughter's subsequent endeavors with the choral rock band The Polyphonic Spree, which he formed following Tripping Daisy's disbandment in 1999. CMJ's Doug Levy said that throughout Jesus Hits Like the Atom Bomb, "you can actually hear the Polyphonic Spree being born in DeLaughter's head", whilst The Houston Chronicle identified "the beginning stages of the Polyphonic Spree" on the album. In 2003, DeLaughter told MTV News:

If I look at why I liked effects on my vocals [on Jesus Hits Like the Atom Bomb], it's because I always wanted to sound like there was more than just myself singing ... I could glide on the melody a lot better. So when I was going through that at the time, I wished there were 10 of me, 10 voices singing as one. I thought, 'Wouldn't it be great to have a band like that?'

After its initial issue, Jesus Hits Like the Atom Bomb was both out of print and unavailable on music streaming services until early 2017, when Island Records made the album available for streaming after Tripping Daisy made news of their reunion public in January of that year. In November 2020, the album was reissued on double vinyl for the first time through the band's own record label Good Records, which was formed shortly after Island ended its contract with the band. Tripping Daisy had planned to issue the album on vinyl around the time of its release but this was indefinitely delayed due to the UMG-PolyGram merger.

== Track listing ==
All lyrics are written Tim DeLaughter; all music is composed by Tripping Daisy, except where noted.

No.	Title	Lyrics	Music	Length
1.	"Field Day Jitters"			4:09
2.	"Waited a Light Year"			6:00
3.	"Sonic Bloom"			3:39
4.	"Bandaids™ for Hire"	Tim DeLaughter; Philip Karnats		2:38
5.	"Mechanical Breakdown"			3:18
6.	"Your Socks Have No Name"			2:31
7.	"Geeareohdoubleyou" ("G.R.O.W")			3:47
8.	"New Plains Medicine"			2:01
9.	"Our Drive to the Sun / Can a Man Mark It?"			5:27
10.	"Human Contact"			5:37
11.	"Pillar"			3:00
12.	"8 Ladies"			3:19
13.	"About the Movies"			5:06
14.	"Tiny Men"			3:25
15.	"Indian Poker Pt. 2 & 3" (Brainiac cover)	Tim Taylor	Tim Taylor	3:06
Total length:				57:10

Notes

- Michael Dodds is credited for the song title of "New Plains Medicine".

== Personnel ==
Personnel per liner notes.

Tripping Daisy
- Tim DeLaughter - vocals, guitars, califone, dulcimer, keyboards, additional drums (12)
- Mark Pirro - bass, percussion
- Benjamin Curtis - drums, percussion, additional drums (10)
- Wes Berggren - guitar, Ace Tone organ, mellotron, cello
- Philip Karnats - guitar, trumpet, banjo

Additional musicians

- Eric Drew Feldman - additional keyboards, additional bass, additional drums (12)
- Julie Duncanville - backing vocals
- The Goldentones - backing vocals
- John Ganser - drums (10)
Production
- Eric Drew Feldman - producer, mixing
- Andy Baker - engineering, mixing
- Suzanne Kappa - engineer assistant (at Dreamland Recording Studios)
- Oswald "Wiz" Bowie - engineering assistant (at Compass Point Studios)
- Howie Weinberg - mastering (at Masterdisk)

Artwork

- Tim DeLaughter - art direction, artwork, collages
- Aldo Sampieri - art consultant
- Joshua Kessler - photography

== Release history ==
Release history for Jesus Hits Like the Atom Bomb
Region	Label	Format	Date	Ref.
United States	Island Records	CD; cassette	July 7, 1998	
Canada	Island Records	CD; cassette	July 7, 1998	
United Kingdom	Island Records	CD; cassette	July 27, 1998	
Various	Good Records	2xLP	November 27, 2020	
Various	Good Records	Cassette	March 15, 2021	
