= Light and Day =

Single by The Polyphonic Spree

from the album The Beginning Stages of...
- Released: February 10, 2003
- Recorded: October 2000
- Genre: Pop
- Length: 3:03
- Label: 679; Hollywood; Good
- Songwriter: Tim DeLaughter

The Polyphonic Spree singles chronology
| "Hanging Around" (2002) | "Light and Day" (2003) | "Soldier Girl" (2003) |

Audio video
- "Light and Day / Reach for the Sun" on YouTube

"Light and Day", also known as "Section 9 (Light & Day/Reach for the Sun)", is a song by The Polyphonic Spree from their 2002 album The Beginning Stages of.... It was released in 2003 as the second single from the album.

The song attracted greater attention after being featured in the 2004 film Eternal Sunshine of the Spotless Mind, and was included on that film’s soundtrack album. A few weeks after the March release of the film, The Polyphonic Spree appeared as themselves to perform it in the April 2004 episode "My Choosiest Choice of All" of the television series Scrubs.

Since then, the song has been used several other times in popular culture—in an episode of Undone, the documentary Murderball, an episode of Chuck, in advertisements for the Grocery Store Sainsbury's, an episode of Las Vegas where The Polyphonic Spree plays it, as well as the theme song in the trailer for the 2012 film adaptation of Dr. Seuss's The Lorax. It was featured in a 2017 episode of Girlboss and the 2017 movie Wonder, where a student choir sings it during a graduation ceremony.

The song also appeared in a joint promotion for Apple’s new iPod Touch (3rd generation) and the Volkswagen Beetle, titled “Pods Unite.”

In April 2010, research conducted by PRS for Music revealed that the song was the most performed in UK television advertising.

The Eternal Sunshine of the Spotless Mind DVD includes a music video for the song, featuring scenes from the movie altered so that both the main actors (Carrey and Winslet), as well as various inanimate background elements of the movie (a brain scan, a plate of vegetables, a house), appear to be lip-syncing to the song.

== Charts ==
Chart performance for "Light and Day"
| Chart (2003) | Peak position |
|---|---|
| Scottish Singles Sales (Official Charts) | 38 |
| UK Singles (Official Charts) | 40 |
