= Copperphone =

Specialty microphone

The Copperphone is a hand crafted specialty dynamic microphone designed and built by The Polyphonic Spree bassist Mark Pirro. It uses components from vintage communications equipment as well as a mechanical filtering device to achieve a limited bandwidth frequency response similar to that of AM radio and the nostalgic sound of the early recordings. The Copperphone is manufactured by Pirro and distributed through his company Placid Audio. Placid Audio microphones have been used by many artists including Green Day, Queens of the Stone Age, Lou Barlow, Rush, Norah Jones, Jack White, St. Vincent, The Bright Light Social Hour, as well as Grammy Winning producer Jacquire King

== History ==
Mark Pirro designed the first Copperphone while playing with The Polyphonic Spree. He wanted to produce a "telephone" voice effect for the group's lead singer Tim DeLaughter. Pirro created the Copperphone to produce the phone effect live on stage as opposed to relying on outboard effects. He created a few prototypes, including one using PVC and duct tape, which led to the creation of the first Copperphone. Pirro then started to produce small quantities of the Copperphone out of his garage. He later developed a smaller version of the Copperphone known as the Copperphone Mini. In 2003, Pirro founded the company Placid Audio for the manufacture and distribution of the Copperphone as well as other audio microphones. Placid Audio is based in Dallas, Texas.

The Copperphone made national news in 2004 when it was mistaken for a pipe bomb as it passed through scanners at Dallas/Fort Worth International Airport. Brian Teasley, percussion player of The Polyphonic Spree, was on his way home after a tour and had a Copperphone packed in his luggage. Due to the microphone's suspicious appearance and internal wiring, Teasley's luggage was held back by TSA officials and the terminal was shut down. The bag was retrieved by the bomb squad using a robot and later 'disarmed' by blasting the contents of the bag with a water cannon. Teasley was unaware of the incident until he arrived at his residence in Birmingham, Alabama where he was approached and questioned by members of the FBI. Eventually the facts were confirmed that the device back in Dallas was not a pipe bomb but was indeed a microphone. The Copperphone survived the water blasting and continued to work as designed.

== Sound and features ==
The Copperphone is hand made. It is built out of polished copper housings and manufactured with an adjustable aluminum mounting bracket to fit North American style microphone stands. The Copperphone naturally yields a classic telephone effect and can achieve a sound similar to an AM radio. The effect comes from the build of the microphone, with the housing working as a ported resonant chamber.
