= Get It On (EP) =

EP by Tripping Daisy
- Released: June 6, 1994
- Recorded: Summer 1993
- Venues: Trees, Dallas, Texas
- Genres: Alternative rock; grunge; neo-psychedelia
- Length: 23:24
- Label: Island Red Label
- Producer: Tripping Daisy

Tripping Daisy chronology
Bill (1992)	Get It On (1994)	I Am an Elastic Firecracker (1995)

Tripping Daisy Live – Get It On (also known as just Get It On) is the first extended play and only live album by American rock band Tripping Daisy. It was released on June 6, 1994, through the Island Red Label. It was intended to be a stop-gap release between the re-release of Bill (1993) and the band's next studio album, I Am an Elastic Firecracker (1995), and to help build up the band's fanbase.

== Composition ==
Get It On was recorded in the summer of 1993 at Trees Dallas. The first two songs on Get It On are derived from the band's debut album Bill, whilst "It's Safe, It's Social" and the title track are new, original songs. The album's final song is a cover of Bad Religion's "We're Only Gonna Die". Get It On was described as featuring a "harder rocking" sound in contrast to that of Bill.

== Reception ==
Professional ratings
Review scores
Source	Rating
AllMusic	2/5 stars

Get It On received mixed reviews from critics. Allmusic awarded the EP two stars out of five. Trouser Press criticized the EP's title track as "a maddening novelty number in which [Tim] DeLaughter blurts the title over and over with barely a pause for breath." Alternatively, Cashbox's Troy J. Augusto praised the EP as "fun filler", and believed that the release "shows further growth from this promising pop-punk quartet".

Tripping Daisy were unhappy with Island's decision to release Get It On, citing its poor quality; Tim DeLaughter commented in 1998 that the band's performance at Trees "wasn't the best show to do [a live album] on". By September 1995, Get It On had sold 4,000 copies in the United States, according to Nielsen SoundScan.

== Track listing ==
All lyrics are written by Tim DeLaughter; all music is composed by Tripping Daisy, except where noted.

No.	Title	Writer(s)	Length
1.	"Blown Away"		4:16
2.	"On the Ground"		4:17
3.	"It's Safe, It's Social"		7:03
4.	"Get It On"		3:46
5.	"We're Only Gonna Die" (Bad Religion cover)	Greg Graffin	3:32
Total length:			23:24

== Personnel ==
Personnel per liner notes.

Tripping Daisy
- Tim DeLaughter – vocals
- Bryan Wakeland – drums
- Wes Berggren – guitar
- Mark Pirro – bass

Production

- James McWilliams – live sound engineer
- Kirby Orrick – mixing (at Time Capsule Recording Studio)
- Greg Calbi – mastering
- Scott Berman – lighting technician
Management
- James Dowdall – A&R
- Rose Noone – A&R
- Eric Ferris – management (for Three Angles Management)
- Lance Miller – production manager
- Stephen Agnew – road manager

Artwork and photography

- Tripping Daisy – art direction
- Deborah Melian – art design
- Alex Halpern (2) – photography
- Alex Rappoport – photography
- Erich Schlegel – photography
- James Bland – photography
- Jared Miller – photography

== Release history ==
Region	Label	Format	Date	Ref.
United States	Island Red Label	CD; cassette	June 6, 1994	
