= Wait (The Polyphonic Spree EP) =

Wait EP

EP by The Polyphonic Spree
- Released: September 5, 2006
- Recorded: 2006
- Genre: Indie rock
- Length: 21:01
- Label: Junket Boy

The Polyphonic Spree chronology
Thumbsucker (2005)	Wait EP (2006)	The Fragile Army (2007)

Professional ratings
Review scores
Source	Rating
AllMusic	3.5/5 stars
Pitchfork	6.2/10

Wait EP is an EP release by The Polyphonic Spree. "Sonic Bloom" is a cover of a song by Tripping Daisy, the former band of three Polyphonic Spree members, Tim DeLaughter, Mark Pirro, and Bryan Wakeland. The EP also features covers of Nirvana's "Lithium" and The Psychedelic Furs' "Love My Way".

== Track listing ==
No.	Title	Writer(s)	Length
1.	"Mental Cabaret"	Tim DeLaughter, The Polyphonic Spree	2:59
2.	"Love My Way"	The Psychedelic Furs	4:19
3.	"Sonic Bloom"	DeLaughter, Tripping Daisy	3:48
4.	"Lithium"	Kurt Cobain	5:24
5.	"I'm Calling"	DeLaughter, The Polyphonic Spree	4:26
