= Pilotdrift =

American rock band

Background information
- Origin: Texarkana, Texas, United States
- Genres: Indie pop, Indie rock, Experimental rock
- Years active: 2004 - present
- Labels: Good Records
- Members: Kelly Carr
- Past members: Eric Russell; John David Blagg; Micah Dorsey; Jay Budzilowski; Ben Rice
- Website: www.pilotdrift.com

Pilotdrift is an American rock band formed in Texarkana, Texas. Their sound has been described as "epic, orchestrated rock." They have toured the US and Canada with The Polyphonic Spree, Supergrass, Eisley, Midlake, and Guster, and have played shows with artists such as The Album Leaf, Jon Brion, DeVotchKa, Akron/Family, Angels of Light, and dios (malos). Their music has been featured in television shows Deadliest Catch and The Messengers.

== History ==
Pilotdrift was formed in 2004 by singer-songwriter Kelly Carr, singer-songwriter Micah Dorsey, drummer Ben Rice, bassist Jay Budzilowski, keyboardist and guitarist Eric Russell, and guitarist John David Blagg. That same year, the band self-released the album Iter Facere, to which Carr and Dorsey each contributed songs. Their fan base quickly grew, and they began playing more shows to larger crowds. Tim DeLaughter, owner of Dallas record store Good Records and frontman of The Polyphonic Spree, attended a Pilotdrift show in his store, and later offered to sign the band to Good Records Recordings, an independent label he and his wife Julie Doyle were launching. Pilotdrift did sign to the label, though Dorsey stepped away from the band, feeling that a life on the road would not agree with her.

On May 20, 2005, Pilotdrift released Water Sphere on Good Records Recordings, which is considered their debut album. Water Sphere consisted of half new songs and half rerecorded versions of Carr's songs from Iter Facere. The album received positive reception from critics and fans. This was followed by tours with The Polyphonic Spree, Eisley, Guster, and Supergrass.

In November 2011, Pilotdrift released the single "All These Things At One Time," featuring Dorsey (now known as Moonstryder).

In 2018, former drummer Ben Rice was nominated for Record of the Year at the Grammy Awards for the song "Shallow", which he'd coproduced with Lady Gaga for the film A Star Is Born (2018 film).

== Discography ==
- Blackbox - 2025
- All These Things At One Time - 2011 - Good Records Recordings (Single)
- Caught In My Trap - 2006 - Original Electric Recording Company (Single)
- Water Sphere – 2005 - Good Records Recordings
- Iter Facere – 2004 - Pilotdrift (discontinued self release)
