= I Am an Elastic Firecracker =

i am an ELASTIC FIRECRACKER

Studio album by Tripping Daisy
- Released: June 20, 1995
- Recorded: 1994 – January 13, 1995
- Studio: Water Music Recording Studios, Hoboken, N.J.
- Genre: Alternative rock; grunge; neo-psychedelia
- Length: 54:29
- Label: Island
- Producer: Ted Niceley; Tripping Daisy

Tripping Daisy chronology
Get It On (1994)	i am an ELASTIC FIRECRACKER (1995)	Time Capsule (1997)

Tripping Daisy studio album chronology
Bill (1992)	I Am an Elastic Firecracker (1995)	Jesus Hits Like the Atom Bomb (1998)

Singles from I Am an Elastic Firecracker
- 1. "I Got a Girl" Released: June 1995; 2. "PirANhA" Released: September 18, 1995; 3. "Trip Along" Released: June 1996

Professional ratings
Review scores
Source	Rating
AllMusic	4/5 stars
The Encyclopedia of Popular Music	3/5 stars
Kerrang!	4/5 stars

I Am an Elastic Firecracker (stylized as i am an ELASTIC FIRECRACKER) is the second studio album by Tripping Daisy, released on June 20, 1995, through Island Records. It is the band's major label debut, and was produced by Ted Niceley. It featured the band's biggest hit, "I Got a Girl", whose video received extensive airplay on MTV. By 1998, the album had sold over 300,000 copies in the United States. The album was certified Platinum in Canada on May 1, 1998.

== Cover art ==
The album's cover art features a photo of Italian artist Guglielmo Achille Cavellini. The photo originated as a piece of stamp art by E.F. Higgins.

== Accolades ==
Publication	Country	Accolade	Year	Rank
VinylMePlease	United States	10 Underappreciated and Overlooked 90s Albums	2016	N/A
Kerrang!	United Kingdom	The 12 most underrated albums of the ’90s	2019	N/A

== Track listing ==
No.	Title	Length
1.	"ROCketPop"	4:05
2.	"baNg"	4:03
3.	"i Got a Girl"	4:05
4.	"PirANhA"	4:47
5.	"MOtivATion"	5:35
6.	"SAme DREss neW dAy"	3:32
7.	"Trip Along"	3:34
8.	"RAINdrOP"	2:50
9.	"STep bEhind"	3:59
10.	"NOOSE"	4:49
11.	"PriCK"	9:19
12.	"High"	3:51

- All songs have stylized capitalization wherever they are mentioned.

== Personnel ==
Tripping Daisy

- Tim DeLaughter – vocals, guitar, artwork
- Wes Berggren – guitar
- Mark Pirro – bass
- Bryan Wakeland – drums

Additional

- Ted Niceley – producer
- Tripping Daisy – producer
- Andy Baker – recording engineer
- Tom Lord-Alge – mixing engineer
- Bob Ludwig – mastering engineer

== Charts ==
Chart (1995)	Peak position
Canadian RPM Albums Chart	44
U.S. Billboard 200	95

== Release history ==
Region	Label	Format	Date	Ref.
United States	Island Records	CD; cassette; LP	June 20, 1995	
Canada	Island Records	CD; cassette	June 20, 1995	
Europe	Island Records	CD; cassette	February 20, 1996	
Various	Music on Vinyl	LP	February 4, 2022	
