= Together We're Heavy =

Studio album by The Polyphonic Spree
- Released: June 30, 2004
- Recorded: December 2002 – January 2003
- Genre: Pop; psychedelic pop; symphonic rock
- Length: 57:47
- Label: Hollywood / Good
- Producer: Eric Drew Feldman, The Speekers, Jeff Levison

The Polyphonic Spree chronology
The Beginning Stages of... (2002)	Together We're Heavy (2004)	Thumbsucker (2005)

Singles from Together We're Heavy
- 1. "Hold Me Now" Released: 2004; 2. "Two Thousand Places" Released: 2004

Professional ratings
Aggregate scores
Source	Rating
Metacritic	70/100
Review scores
Source	Rating
AllMusic	3.5/5 stars
Entertainment.ie	4/5 stars
NME	4/5 stars
Pitchfork	7.6/10
Rolling Stone	3/5 stars
The Village Voice	B−

Together We're Heavy is the second release from Dallas symphonic rock group The Polyphonic Spree. Produced by Eric Drew Feldman and released in Japan on June 30, 2004, Europe on July 12 and North America on July 13. It includes the hit singles "Hold Me Now" and "Two Thousand Places". The album was released by Hollywood Records, and represents the band's first "true" album (their previous release, The Beginning Stages of..., was recorded as a demo and released only by popular demand).

The US version of Together We're Heavy contains an additional bonus DVD (entitled "The Adventure of Listening") while the Japanese version contains three bonus songs.

It reached number one on the Billboard Top Heatseekers albums chart in the United States.

== Track listing ==
All songs written by Tim DeLaughter.

1. "Section 11 (A Long Day Continues/We Sound Amazed)" – 8:32
2. "Section 12 (Hold Me Now)" – 4:30
3. "Section 13 (Diamonds/Mild Devotion to Majesty)" – 4:55
4. "Section 14 (Two Thousand Places)" – 5:19
5. "Section 15 (Ensure Your Reservation)" – 1:39
6. "Section 16 (One Man Show)" – 4:58
7. "Section 17 (Suitcase Calling)" – 8:48
8. "Section 18 (Everything Starts at the Seam)" – 1:54
9. "Section 19 (When the Fool Becomes a King)" – 10:38
10. "Section 20 (Together We're Heavy)" – 6:30
1. "Bonus Section 1 (The Best Part)" (Japanese release only)
2. "Bonus Section 2 (Mercury Tea)" (Japanese release only)
3. "Bonus Section 3 (Working Out the Kinks [Demo 2002])" (Japanese release only)

"The Adventure of Listening" DVD:

- "A Blissed Out Occasion" – Live at the Summersonic Festival, Tokyo, 2003
  - Contains "The Anthem for Summer Camp", "It's the Sun", "Light & Day", "Everything Starts at the Seam" and "When the Fool Becomes a King"
- "Air Near the Ground" – Live at the Cabaret Metro, Chicago, 2003
  - Contains "Soldier Girl", "Hanging Around the Day (Parts 1 & 2)" and "It's the Sun"
- "Confessions of an Instigator" – An interview with Tim DeLaughter
- "Moving Pictures"
  - Contains the music video for "Light & Day (Single Version)", the animated video for "Light & Day (Orchestral Version)" and "The Tramp (A Vignette)" (previously titled "Cane" and played to the song "Ensure Your Reservation")

== Singles ==
- "Hold Me Now" CD single (July 26, 2004)
1. "Hold Me Now" (Radio Edit – UK Edit)
2. "Hold Me Now" (Album Version)
3. "Working Out the Kinks" (Demo)
- "Two Thousand Places" CD single (December 8, 2004)
1. "Two Thousand Places"
2. "The Best Part"
3. "Happy Xmas (War Is Over)"

== Personnel ==
Adapted from AllMusic.

=== Musicians ===
- Tim DeLaughter: Lead vocals, guitars, percussion, tubular bells, piano, organ, samples, various noises
- Ryan Fitzgerald: Acoustic and electric guitars, banjo
- Joe Butcher: Pedal steel
- Evan Hisey: Keyboards, organ, synthesizers
- Jesse Hester: Piano, vocals
- Mark Pirro: Bass guitar
- Rick Nelson: Double bass, violin, viola
- Bryan Wakeland: Drums, percussion
- Audrey Easley: Flute, piccolo, tin whistle, Electronic Wind Instruments
- Louis Schwadron: French horn
- Toby Halbrooks: Theremin
- James Reimer: Trombone, glockenspiel
- Logan Keese: Trumpet, flugelhorn
- Jennifer Jobe, Jennie Kelley, Jessica Jordan, Julie Duncanville, Kelly Repka, Michael Turner: Lead, backing and choir vocals

=== Production ===
- Produced by Eric Drew Feldman, Jeff Levison and The Speekers
- Recorded and engineered by Andrew Paul Baker, Ronnie Katz, Allen Sides, The Speekers and Dave Willingham
- Assistant engineers: Chris Bell, Joel Pelphrey, Darrell Thorp
- Mixed by Rich Costey, The Speekers and Dave Willingham
- Mix assistant: Claudius Mittendorfer
- Digital editing: Rail Jon Rogut
- Mastered by Mark Chalecki and Ted Jensen

== Charts ==
Chart performance for Together We're Heavy
Chart (2004–2005)	Peak position
Australian Albums (ARIA)	85
Scottish Albums (OCC)	60
UK Albums (OCC)	61
US Billboard 200	121
US Heatseekers Albums (Billboard)	1

== Release history ==
CD

- UK release (July 12, 2004)
- US release (July 13, 2004)
- Japanese release (June 30, 2004)

DVD-Audio 5.1 Surround + DTS-Encoded track

- US release (September 14, 2004)
