= Holidaydream: Sounds of the Holidays, Vol. One =

Studio album by The Polyphonic Spree
- Released: October 23, 2012
- Recorded: 2012
- Genre: Indie rock
- Length: 38:53
- Label: Kirtland; Good
- Producer: Eric Drew Feldman and The Speekers

The Polyphonic Spree chronology
The Fragile Army (2007)	Holidaydream: Sounds of the Holidays, Vol. One (2012)	Yes, It's True (2013)

Professional ratings
Aggregate scores
Source	Rating
Metacritic	73/100
Review scores
Source	Rating
AllMusic	4/5 stars
Consequence of Sound	3.5/5 stars

Holidaydream: Sounds of the Holidays, Vol. One is a Christmas album release by The Polyphonic Spree.

== Track listing ==
All arrangements by the Polyphonic Spree except "Silent Night" arranged by Ricky Rasura and "Happy Xmas (War Is Over)" by John Lennon/Yoko Ono.

Holidaydream: Sounds of the Holidays, Vol. One track listing
No.	Title	Writer(s)	Length
1.	"A Working Elf's Theme"	Tim DeLaughter	1:25
2.	"Winter Wonderland"	Felix Bernard, Richard B. Smith	2:10
3.	"The Christmas Song (Chestnuts Roasting on an Open Fire)"	Mel Tormé, Bob Wells	2:27
4.	"Happy Xmas (War Is Over)"	John Lennon, Yoko Ono	3:50
5.	"Silent Night"	Joseph Mohr, Franz Xaver Gruber	1:46
6.	"Silver Bells"	Jay Livingston, Ray Evans	6:56
7.	"Do You Hear What I Hear?"	Noël Regney, Gloria Shayne	3:44
8.	"Carol of the Drum (Little Drummer Boy)"	Katherine Kennicott Davis	4:10
9.	"White Christmas"	Irving Berlin	2:08
10.	"Let it Snow"	Sammy Cahn, Jule Styne	2:39
11.	"It's the Most Wonderful Time of the Year"	Edward Pola, George Wyle	2:39
12.	"Silver Bells (Reprise)"	Livingston, Evans	4:05
13.	"Holidaydream"	DeLaughter	0:54

== Charts ==
Chart performance for Holidaydream
Chart (2012)	Peak position
US Heatseekers Albums (Billboard)	45
