= The Fragile Army =

Studio album by The Polyphonic Spree
- Released: June 19, 2007
- Recorded: January – April 2006
- Genres: Pop, psychedelic pop
- Length: 46:42
- Labels: TVT Records; Good Records
- Producers: John Congleton, The Speekers

The Polyphonic Spree chronology
Wait EP (2006)	The Fragile Army (2007)	Holidaydream: Sounds of the Holidays, Vol. One (2012)

Professional ratings
Aggregate scores
Source	Rating
Metacritic	68/100
Review scores
Source	Rating
Allmusic	4.5/5 stars
Music Box	3/5 stars
NME	6/10 stars
Pitchfork Media	(6.4/10)
PopMatters	7/10 stars
AbsolutePunk.net	(81%)

The Fragile Army is the third album from the symphonic-rock group The Polyphonic Spree. The album was released on TVT Records on June 19, 2007.

On April 26, 2007, an eight-minute-long mash-up preview of the album was made available as a free download.

On May 12, 2007, the entire album was leaked to various P2P networks. The leaked version of the album includes a song entitled "Section 27 (Oh I Feel Fine)". However, on the actual album Section 27 is a new version of the track "Mental Cabaret", which originally featured on the Wait EP.

There was also a deluxe version of the album released including a patch and a DVD. Additionally, there is a double vinyl available for sale that also includes a voucher for online download of the album in MP3 format.

The Fragile Army is the Polyphonic Spree's only record on which lead guitarist Annie Clark, better known as St. Vincent, appears as an official member of the band. Clark left the group shortly before the album's release. Pianist Mike Garson, best known for his work with David Bowie, was also part of the band's lineup during the recording.

== Track listing ==
All songs written by Tim DeLaughter, except where noted.

1. "Section 21 (Together We're Heavy)" - 0:31
2. "Section 22 (Running Away)" - 3:33
3. "Section 23 (Get Up and Go)" - 3:54
4. "Section 24 (The Fragile Army)" - 4:02
5. "Section 25 (Younger Yesterday)" - 4:35
6. "Section 26 (We Crawl)" - 3:29
7. "Section 27 (Mental Cabaret)" - 3:00
8. "Section 28 (Guaranteed Nightlite)" - 3:55
9. "Section 29 (Light to Follow)" - 4:25
10. "Section 30 (Watch Us Explode (Justify))" - 4:41
11. "Section 31 (Overblow Your Nest)" - 4:48
12. "Section 32 (The Championship)" - 5:50
- Bonus tracks on the Limited Edition (there is a Limited Edition without these bonus tracks):
1. "Bonus Track (Lithium)" (Kurt Cobain)
2. "Bonus Track (Checking Out)"

== Personnel ==
- Tim Delaughter - Lead vocals, additional guitars, keys, percussion
- Mark Pirro - Bass
- Bryan Wakeland - Drums, percussion
- Ryan Fitzgerald - Electric and acoustic guitars
- Annie Clark - Electric and acoustic guitars, keyboards, backing vocals
- Mike Garson - Piano, keyboards, backing vocals
- Evan Hisey - Keyboards, samples
- Audrey Easley - Flute, Piccolo, Electronic Wind Instrument
- Rick Nelson - Violin, upright bass
- Ricky Rasura - Classical Harp
- Daniel Hart - Viola
- Sara Donaldson - Cello
- Louis Schwadron - French Horn
- Mike St. Clair - Trombone
- Logan Keese - Trumpet, cornet
- Matt Bricker - Additional Trumpet
- Mike Dillon - Vibraphone, additional percussion
- Backing Vocals:
  - Jennefer Jobe-Penn
  - Julie Doyle
  - Kelly Repka
  - Jessica Jordan
  - Jenny Kirtland
  - Jennie Kelley
  - Apotsala Wilson

== Charts ==
Chart	Peak position
US Billboard 200	113
US Heatseekers Albums (Billboard)	1
US Independent Albums (Billboard)	8
