= Water Sphere =

Studio album by Pilotdrift
- Released: 2005
- Recorded: 2005
- Genre: indie pop
- Length: 47:36
- Label: Good Records
- Producer: Pilotdrift

Pilotdrift chronology
Iter Facere (2004)	Water Sphere (2005)

Water Sphere is the second LP from the band Pilotdrift. It features remastered versions of tracks from their debut album, Iter Facere, as well as four previously unreleased songs.

== Track listing ==
All songs written by Pilotdrift.

1. "Caught In My Trap" – 3:51
2. "Bubblecraft" – 4:43
3. "Passenger Seat" – 3:39
4. "Late Night In A Wax Museum" – 4:45
5. "Jekyll And Hyde Suite" – 9:46
6. "Elephant Island" - 5:39
7. "Rings Of Symbols" - 6:39
8. "Comets" - 2:50
9. "Dancing Bear" - 3:45
10. "So Long" - 5:44

== Trivia ==
- The song Elephant Island was inspired by the story of Ernest Shackleton's 1914-1916 trans-Antarctic expedition.
- Passenger Seat was previously released under the title Picturesque.
- A music video was produced for Bubblecraft by Swerve Pictures in Austin, Texas.
