= Preteen Zenith =

American rock band

- Origin: Dallas, Texas, United States
- Genres: Grunge, alternative rock, neo-psychedelia
- Years active: 2011–present
- Label: Good Records
- Members: Tim DeLaughter; Phil Karnats; Jason Garner; Dylan Silvers; Julie Doyle; Evan Hisey

Preteen Zenith is an American rock band fronted by Tripping Daisy and The Polyphonic Spree frontman, Tim DeLaughter. They were formed in 2011 and feature ex-members of Tripping Daisy and The Polyphonic Spree. Their second single featured Erykah Badu and was released in March 2012.

== Discography ==
=== Albums ===
- Rubble Guts and BB Eye (2012) - Good Records

=== Singles ===
- "Breathe" (2011) - Good Records
- "Damage Control" (2012) - Good Records
