= Thumbsucker (soundtrack) =

Soundtrack album by The Polyphonic Spree, featuring Elliott Smith
- Released: September 13, 2005
- Genre: Pop
- Label: Hollywood / Good

The Polyphonic Spree chronology
Together We're Heavy (2004)	Thumbsucker (2005)	Wait EP (2006)

Professional ratings
Review scores
Source	Rating
AllMusic	4/5 stars
Pitchfork	5.2/10

Thumbsucker is the soundtrack to the film of the same name, which is based in the novel of the same name by Walter Kirn. It was released on September 13, 2005, under the Hollywood Records label. It was originally intended to be created by Elliott Smith, but after his death in 2003, The Polyphonic Spree was chosen to complete it when director Mike Mills attended a performance of theirs and was impressed. Three tracks by Smith remain on the release.

== Track listing ==
All tracks are written by Tim DeLaughter and The Polyphonic Spree; except where noted.

No.	Title	Writer(s)	Length
1.	"The Crash"		0:55
2.	"Scream & Shout"		2:11
3.	"Slow Halls"		0:43
4.	"What Would You Let Go"		1:53
5.	"Empty Rooms"		1:02
6.	"Wonderful For You"		1:50
7.	"The Rebecca Fantasy"		0:30
8.	"Thirteen" (by Elliott Smith)	Christopher Bell, Alex Chilton	2:40
9.	"Pink Trash Dream"		0:30
10.	"The Green Lights"		1:14
11.	"Debate Montage"		3:05
12.	"Trouble" (by Elliott Smith)	Yusuf Islam	2:55
13.	"Skinny Dip"		2:22
14.	"Sourness Makes It Right"		2:09
15.	"Some of the Parts"		2:13
16.	"Matt Schraam"		1:07
17.	"Let's Get Lost" (by Elliott Smith)	Smith	2:25
18.	"Justin's Hypnosis"		1:32
19.	"The Call of the Wild"		0:55
20.	"Wait and See"		1:01
21.	"Move Away and Shine"		3:59
22.	"Acceptance"		30:22
23.	"Move Away and Shine" (In a Dream Version)		3:47
