= I Got a Girl =

I Got a Girl may refer to:

- "I Got a Girl" (Lou Bega song)
- "I Got a Girl" (Tripping Daisy song)

== See also ==
- "I Got the Girl", a song by Bon Jovi from Crush
