= Get It On =

Get It On may refer to:

== Songs ==
- "Get it On" (Diesel song), 1995
- "Get It On" (Grinderman song), 2007
- "Get It On" (Intenso Project song), 2004
- "Get It On" (Kingdom Come song), 1988
- "Get It On" (Kumi Koda song), 2006
- "Get It On" (T. Rex song), retitled "Bang a Gong (Get It On)" in the U.S., 1971; covered by the Power Station, 1985
- "Get It On", by Chase from Chase, 1971; prompted the retitling of the T. Rex song
- "Get It On", by Metro Station from Savior, 2015
- "Get It On", by Rasheeda from Dirty South, 2001
- "Get It On", by Turbonegro from Apocalypse Dudes, 1998
- "Get It On", by Vains of Jenna, 2009

== Albums ==
- Get It On (album), by Pacific Gas & Electric, 1968
- Get It On!, by Fraternity of Man, 1969
- Get It On (EP), by Tripping Daisy, 1994

== See also ==
- Let's Get It On, a 1973 album by Marvin Gaye
  - "Let's Get It On" (song), the title song
- Get It On...Tonite, a 1999 album by Montell Jordan
