= Yes, It's True =

Studio album by The Polyphonic Spree
- Released: August 6, 2013
- Genre: Psychedelic pop; indie rock
- Length: 48:46 (standard edition)
- Label: Good; Kirtland (North America); Cherry Red (Europe)

The Polyphonic Spree chronology
Holidaydream: Sounds of the Holidays, Vol. One (2012)	Yes, It's True (2013)

Singles from Yes, It's True
- 1. "You Don't Know Me" Released: June 11, 2013

Professional ratings
Aggregate scores
Source	Rating
Metacritic	63/100
Review scores
Source	Rating
AllMusic	4/5 stars
Consequence of Sound	2/5 stars
Crackle Feedback	7/10 stars
The Independent	4/5 stars
Slant Magazine	2.5/5 stars

Yes, It's True is the fourth studio album by American pop band The Polyphonic Spree. It was released on August 6, 2013.

== Track listing ==
All tracks are written by Tim DeLaughter, except where noted.

No.	Title	Length
1.	"Section 33 (You Don't Know Me)"	3:24
2.	"Section 34 (Popular by Design)" (DeLaughter, Julie A. Doyle)	4:13
3.	"Section 35 (Hold Yourself Up)" (DeLaughter, Doyle)	4:23
4.	"Section 36 (Carefully Try)"	3:54
5.	"Section 37 (You're Golden)"	4:08
6.	"Section 38 (Heart Talk)"	3:42
7.	"Section 39 (Blurry Up the Lines)"	4:25
8.	"Section 40 (Let Them Be)"	3:13
9.	"Section 41 (Raise Your Head)"	5:17
10.	"Section 42 (What Would You Do?)" (DeLaughter, Doyle)	4:36
11.	"Section 43 (Battlefield)" (3:56, instrumental hidden track starts at 4:08)	7:27
Total length:		48:46

iTunes bonus track
No.	Title	Length
12.	"Bullseye"	5:54
