= The Beginning Stages of... =

Studio album by The Polyphonic Spree
- Released: June 4, 2002
- Recorded: October 29–31, 2000
- Genre: Pop, psychedelic pop
- Length: 68:19
- Label: Hollywood / Good
- Producer: The Polyphonic Spree

The Polyphonic Spree chronology
The Beginning Stages of... (2002)	Together We're Heavy (2004)

Alternative cover
- Cover of UK release

Alternative cover
- Cover of 2004 US re-release

Singles from The Beginning Stages of...
- 1. "Soldier Girl" Released: May 5, 2002; 2. "Hanging Around" Released: October 21, 2002; 3. "Light and Day" Released: February 10, 2003; 4. "Soldier Girl" Released: July 14, 2003 (reissue)

Professional ratings
Aggregate scores
Source	Rating
Metacritic	84/100
Review scores
Source	Rating
AllMusic	4.5/5 stars
Dotmusic	4.5/5 stars
Entertainment Weekly	B
The Guardian	4/5 stars
NME	9/10
Pitchfork	6.1/10
Playlouder	4.5/5 stars
Q	4/5 stars
Rolling Stone	3/5 stars
Uncut	4/5 stars

The Beginning Stages of... is the debut studio album from The Polyphonic Spree. The US re-release version of the album has both the original CD plus a bonus CD that features four alternate tracks and a music video for the single version of "Light and Day". The UK re-release is identical to the original release. The album is also available on gatefold vinyl.

== Track listing ==
All songs written by Tim DeLaughter.

1. "Section 1 (Have a Day/Celebratory)" – 4:38
2. "Section 2 (It's the Sun)" – 5:33
3. "Section 3 (Days Like This Keep Me Warm)" – 4:05
4. "Section 4 (La La)" – 2:10
5. "Section 5 (Middle of the Day)" – 2:45
6. "Section 6 (Hanging Around the Day Part 1)" – 2:37
7. "Section 7 (Hanging Around the Day Part 2)" – 2:39
8. "Section 8 (Soldier Girl)" – 3:59
9. "Section 9 (Light and Day/Reach for the Sun)" – 3:23
10. "Section 10 (A Long Day)" – 36:30

=== US re-release bonus disc ===
1. "Light and Day" (Single version) – 3:03
2. "Have a Day" (KCRW Morning Becomes Eclectic version) - 4:55
3. "It's the Sun" (KCRW Morning Becomes Eclectic version) – 5:33
4. "Soldier Girl" (UK Single version) - 2:23
5. "Light and Day" (Orchestral version) - 2:48
6. "Light and Day" (Music video, multimedia track)

=== UK double disc ===
Disc 1

1. "Section 1 (Have a Day/Celebratory)" – 4:38
2. "Section 2 (It's the Sun)" – 5:33
3. "Section 3 (Days Like This Keep Me Warm)" – 4:05
4. "Section 4 (La La)" – 2:10
5. "Section 5 (Middle of the Day)" – 2:45
6. "Section 6 (Hanging Around the Day Part 1)" – 2:37
7. "Section 7 (Hanging Around the Day Part 2)" – 2:39
8. "Section 8 (Soldier Girl)" – 3:59
9. "Section 9 (Light and Day/Reach for the Sun)" – 3:23
10. "Section 10 (A Long Day)" – 1:45
11. "Soldier Girl" (Alternate Version) – 3:05
12. "Hanging Around" (Alternate Version) – 3:48
13. "Light and Day" (Alternate Version) – 3:05
14. "It's the Sun" (Alternate Version) – 4:22

Disc 2

See the Beginning Stages of... Live DVD, featuring "Light and Day", "Hanging Around", and "Soldier Girl", plus additional clips, When the Sound Went Down, backstage and onstage photo galleries.

== Singles ==
=== CD ===
- Soldier Girl E.P. (May 5, 2002)
1. Soldier Girl (2002 Album Version)
2. Sun (Section 2 from The Beginning Stages of...)
3. Soldier Girl
4. Soldier Girl (Radio Edit)
5. Soldier Girl (Section 8 from The Beginning Stages of...)
- Hanging Around CD1 (Enhanced CD) (October 21, 2002)
1. Hanging Around
2. Five Years (Live at Maida Vale/Radio 1)
3. Fields (Live at Maida Vale/Radio 1)
4. Hanging Around [Multimedia Track]
- Hanging Around CD2 (Enhanced CD) (October 21, 2002)
1. What We Will Be (Live at the Union Chapel, London)
2. Hanging Around (Live at the Union Chapel, London)
3. Soldier Girl (Live at the Union Chapel, London)
- Light and Day CD1 (Enhanced CD) (February 10, 2003)
1. Light and Day (Single Version)
2. The March
3. Light and Day (The Bees Remix)
- Light and Day CD2 (Enhanced CD) (February 10, 2003)
1. Light and Day (Live at the Shepards Bush Empire, London)
2. Have a Day (Live at the Shepards Bush Empire, London)
3. Days Like These Keep Me Warm (Live at the Shepards Bush Empire, London)
4. Light and Day [Multimedia Track]
- Soldier Girl CD1 (July 14, 2003)
1. Soldier Girl (Single Version)
2. It's the Sun (New Version)
3. Soldier Girl (Death in Vegas Remix)
- Light and Day EP (October, 2003)
1. Light and Day (Single Version)
2. The March
3. Soldier Girl (Stereolab Mix)

=== Vinyl ===
- Hanging Around 7" Gatefold Vinyl (October 24, 2002)
1. Hanging Around
2. Five Years (Live at Maida Vale/Radio 1)
- Light and Day 12" Vinyl (February 10, 2003)
1. Soldier Girl (RJD2 Instrumental)
2. Light and Day (Single Version)
3. The March (Symphonic Version)
- Soldier Girl 7" Gatefold Vinyl (July 14, 2003)
1. Soldier Girl (Single Version)
2. It's the Sun (The Go! Team Remix)

=== DVD ===
- Soldier Girl DVD (July 14, 2003)
1. Soldier Girl (Video)
2. Soldier Girl (Zongamin Remix)
3. Soldier Girl (Stereolab Remix)

== Personnel ==
- Todd Berridge – viola
- Jessica Berridge – vocals
- Jeff Bouck – percussion, car tailpipes, tablas, timpani, gong, vocals
- Austen Brown – vocals
- Joe Butcher-Sho-Bud – pedal steel, Moog Rogue, Korg N-5, egg shaker
- Erik Courson – vocals
- Chris Curiel – trumpet
- Tim DeLaughter – lead vocals, guitar, keyboards
- Julie Doyle – vocals
- Audrey Easley – flute, piccolo
- Ryan Fitzgerald – vocals, guitar
- Toby Halbrooks – theremin
- Jessie Hester – vocals, piano, keyboards
- Even Hisey – keyboards
- Ray Ivy – vocals
- Carlos Jackson – Farfisa organ, bells, tambourine, vocals
- Maria Jeffers – cello
- Jennifer Jobe – vocals
- Jessica Jordan – vocals
- Logan Keese – trumpet, flugelhorn
- Jennie Kelley – vocals
- Stephen Kirkham – vocals
- John Lamonica – vocals
- Mark McKeever – keyboards, piano, Moog synthesizer, trumpet, vocals
- Mike Melendi – percussion
- Rick Nelson – viola, violin, upright bass, cello
- Chris Penn – vocals
- Mark Pirro – bass
- Ricky Rasura – classical harp
- James Reimer – trombone
- Kelly Repka – vocals
- Christy Stewart – vocals
- Andrew Tinker – French horn
- Michael Turner – vocals
- Bryan Wakeland – drums, percussion

== Charts ==
Chart performance for The Beginning Stages of...
Chart (2002–2003)	Peak position
Irish Albums (IRMA)	65
Scottish Albums (OCC)	58
UK Albums (OCC)	70
