= Iter Facere =

Studio album by Pilotdrift
- Released: 2004
- Recorded: 2004
- Genre: indie pop
- Length: 1:02:24
- Label: Self-Released
- Producer: Pilotdrift

Pilotdrift chronology
Iter Facere (2004)	Water Sphere (2005)

Iter Facere is the first album by the band Pilotdrift. The band recorded, produced, mastered, and released the LP themselves. It is now out of print.

== Track listing ==
All songs written by Pilotdrift.

1. "Caught In My Trap" – 4:07
2. "Picturesque" – 2:55
3. "Elephant Island" – 5:50
4. "Sails" – 4:39
5. "Winter" – 3:38
6. "Rings Of Symbols" – 7:51
7. "The Meaningless Words Of Bobby Baker" – 3:58
8. "Doom And Despair" – 3:26
9. "Dancing Bear" – 3:45
10. "Science And Enlightenment" – 3:58
11. "The Undiscovered Epic Of Walter Champion" – 6:57
12. "A Traitor's Brain" – 5:39
13. "So Long" – 5:41

== Trivia ==
- The name of the album, when literally translated from Latin to English, means "to make a journey" or "to travel".
- The song "Elephant Island" was inspired by the story of Ernest Shackleton's 1914–1916 trans-Antarctic expedition.
- The train sound effect at the beginning of "Rings of Symbols" was created with a Fender Stratocaster playing through a Boss GT-6 processor.
- The Lyrics of "The Meaningless Words of Bobby Baker" were ad-libbed by former guitarist/vocalist Micah Dorsey and recorded in a single take.
- The vocal samples in "Science and Enlightenment" were taken from a cassette tape of Kelly Carr's father, Mike.
- "The Undiscovered Epic of Walter Champion" was heavily influenced by The Beatles. They are mentioned in the lyrics and the instrumentals are very similar to those of "I Want You (She's So Heavy)".
