= Tripping Daisy (album) =

Studio album by Tripping Daisy
- Released: April 18, 2000
- Recorded: Spring 1999
- Genre: Alternative rock, psychedelic rock
- Length: 60:11
- Label: Sugar Fix
- Producer: Tripping Daisy

Tripping Daisy chronology
Jesus Hits Like the Atom Bomb (1998)	Tripping Daisy (2000)

Professional ratings
Review scores
Source	Rating
Allmusic	4/5 stars

Tripping Daisy is the fourth and final studio album by Tripping Daisy. It was released in 2000 on the independent label Sugar Fix Records. It marks the band's final release with guitarist Wes Berggren and drummer Benjamin Curtis.

== Production ==
The album was released following the termination of the group's contract with Island Records. It came out a few months after the death of guitarist Wes Berggren, after which point the band broke up. The album is now out of print. Starting with the track "Drama Day Weekend", the majority of the songs on the record flow into each other, as though one long musical composition. According to Tim DeLaughter, there were only 500 CDs made. The final track ends at 4:37 & starts up again at 10:57 and plays out till the end (as studio gibberish & outtakes).

== Track listing ==
No.	Title	Length
1.	"Community Mantra"	4:56
2.	"Kids Are Calling"	3:27
3.	"Stella Is a Planet"	3:00
4.	"Soothing Jubilee"	3:36
5.	"Drama Day Weekend"	3:34
6.	"Tragiverse"	7:29
7.	"Jim's Longtime Voice"	1:56
8.	"One Through Four"	3:33
9.	"You First"	2:52
10.	"I Am Good"	2:22
11.	"Halo Comb"	3:20
12.	"This Cradle Song"	4:26
13.	"Foot Dance"	3:36
14.	"The Sudden Shift Worried Him"	12:12

== Personnel ==
Credits taken from Allmusic

- Tim DeLaughter – vocals, guitar, keyboards
- Mark Pirro – bass, backing vocals, percussion
- Benjamin Curtis – drums
- Philip Karnats – guitar, backing vocals, trumpet
- Wes Berggren – lead guitar, keyboards

Production

- Tim DeLaughter – artwork
- Erik J. Courson – art direction
- Rachel Gutek – art direction
- Wyatt Parkins – art direction
- Joshua Kessler – photography
- Chris Penn – reissue producer
