= Mandrake Project =

American rock band

- Mandrake Project Performing live for A Miraculous Container, March 2009

Background information
- Origin: Pittsburgh, Pennsylvania, U.S.
- Genres: Post-rock, progressive rock, ambient
- Years active: 2002–present
- Labels: Overneath, Blistering
- Members: Kirk Salopek; Rick Nelson; David Jamison; Ryan Meals; Anthony Pecora; Ben Zerbe; Denny Karl
- Past members: Doug Korekach; Kevin Charney; Jon Bechtol; Jake Colvin; David Fresch; Justin Greenwald
- Website: mandrakeproject.com

Mandrake Project was an American band based in Pittsburgh, Pennsylvania. Primarily an instrumental band, they have been referred to as crossover progressive, ambient, jam-band and even jazz-rock.

In November 2007, Mandrake Project began the recording of their second album and first "official" label release, "A Miraculous Container." The collection of songs for the album was recorded over a period of about 10 months and was released on March 24, 2009. Through a turn of events, the band ended up signing a contract with Swedish label Blistering Records, who deal primarily with hard rock and metal acts.

Despite the often confusing representation between the band and label, the album garnered critical praise in the months after its release in both press and AAA radio. In February 2009, a pre-release copy of "A Miraculous Container" caught the ear of John Diliberto, host of the nationally syndicated radio program Echoes. The album appeared on the show's Top 25 in June 2009 with artists such as Moby, Bill Frisell, Robin Guthrie and Leo Abrahams, peaking at #2 in August and earning a spot on the overall Top 25 for 2009.

This eventually led to an invitation to perform live for an installment of the show's acclaimed Livingroom Concert Series. One of the live tracks recorded during the concert, "Beauxsong" was included on the 15th Anniversary Echoes Livingroom Concert Series CD, Still Echoes, alongside artists as diverse as Yo-Yo Ma, Pat Metheny, Air, Al Di Meola and Brian Eno. In addition, Mandrake Project was added to both John Diliberto's Top 10 CD's and Songs lists for 2009, ranking #9 for Best Album with A Miraculous Container and #7 for Best Song with "And Five Makes Twenty."

Jean-Phillipe Haas, French webzine critic at Chromatique.net listed A Miraculous Container as his pick for the #1 album in 2009. Several other US & European music webzines and press offered positive reviews of the record as well in the months after its release.
