= Tripping Daisy =

American rock band

- Origin: Dallas, Texas, United States
- Genres: alternative rock; neo-psychedelia
- Years active: 1990–1999; 2024–present; (Reunions: 2017, 2019, 2022)
- Labels: Dragon Street; Island; Sugar Fix; Good
- Spinoffs: The Polyphonic Spree
- Members: Tim DeLaughter; Mark Pirro; Bryan Wakeland; Philip Karnats; Dylan Silvers; Nick Earl
- Past members: Wes Berggren; Jeff Bouck; Mitch Marine; Cory Lemons; Ben Curtis; Robert Hubbard; Brandon Curtis
- Website: trippingdaisy.com

Tripping Daisy is an American neo-psychedelic pop rock band that was formed in Dallas, Texas, by lead singer/guitarist Tim DeLaughter in 1990 along with Jeff Bouck (drums), Wes Berggren (guitar) and Mark Pirro (bass).

The group disbanded in 1999 following the sudden death of Berggren. The remaining members reformed in 2017 for a reunion performance at the Homegrown Festival in Dallas, following which they played a number of concerts in Texas during 2017, 2019, and 2022. In June 2024, the band officially reformed, and have plans to tour and record a new album.

== History ==
=== First album ===
After playing local gigs, the band released their first single, "Lost and Found", which received moderate airplay on local radio station KDGE. The band incorporated a light show similar to The Joshua Light Show at the Fillmore East. It used effects such as hand made slide shows with multi layered 16 mm projections along with oil and water. This visual attention was present in their very first show and was the beginning of many multimedia attractions to come.

The band soon began recording what would become their first full-length album, Bill, released on the independent label Dragon Street Records. The album was a favorite on Dallas radio. The sound on Bill is characterized by the heavy use of vocal effects and unconventional riffs, both of which lend to a neo-psychedelic sound. Bill was re-released on major label Island Records, with a different mix and mastering from the Dragon Street version. It also excludes the cover song "Green Tamborine".

In 1992 Bryan Wakeland replaced Jeff Bouck as the band's drummer. The band released a live album in 1994 titled Get It On. The album closes with a cover of the Bad Religion song "We're Only Gonna Die". DeLaughter has been noted as saying in 1990s era interviews that the record label pushed the live album out to capitalize on the popularity of Bill, and it is not one of his favorite albums.

=== Commercial breakthrough ===
After signing a deal with Island Records, which re-released Bill (minus the cover song "Green Tambourine"), the band recorded their first major-label release, I Am an Elastic Firecracker. The music video for the song "I Got a Girl" received extended airplay on MTV. A segment of the video was used in a Beavis and Butt-Head episode, a show known to lampoon popular music videos of the time. Wakeland remained in the band until after the tour for I Am an Elastic Firecracker when he chose to leave, and was replaced by Mitch Marine and Cory Lemons. Phil Karnats joined the band on lead guitar soon after Wakeland's departure, allowing DeLaughter more freedom to focus on lead vocal duty.

=== Later albums ===
The band's third album, Jesus Hits Like the Atom Bomb, was a mix of both creativity and experimentalism. DeLaughter has been quoted as saying that the album "is the band at their best". The album has a fragmented style: from one vignette to another. While the album was not a commercial success, it was critically acclaimed; the Dallas Observer later ranked the album's third track, "Sonic Bloom", at number 100 on their "100 Best Texas Songs of All Time" list. Marine toured with the band until he was replaced by Ben Curtis, who drummed on Jesus Hit Like the Atom Bomb and their fourth album, the self-titled Tripping Daisy. Other releases during this period include Time Capsule (a mix of old demos, b-sides, and one new song – the only officially released studio recording to feature drummer Mitch Marine) and The Tops Off Our Heads (an impromptu "jam" EP recording that marked the band's first post-major label release).

=== Death of Wes Berggren and split ===
Wes Berggren was found dead of a drug overdose in his apartment on October 27, 1999. The Dallas County Medical Examiner's office found traces of cocaine, propoxyphene, and benzodiazepine in his body. With Berggren's death, the band cancelled its upcoming tour dates and finished some minor recording sessions for the final album. The self-titled album was released posthumously, with Berggren's father Don playing a Fender Rhodes electric piano on the unfinished song "Soothing Jubilee". The album included a re-recording of "One Through Four", a song originally featured on Bill. Tripping Daisy officially disbanded on December 14, 1999.

After the band disbanded, Tim DeLaughter, Mark Pirro, Bryan Wakeland and Jeff Bouck formed the chamber pop group The Polyphonic Spree. Ben Curtis went on to join brother Brandon Curtis in the progressive space rock trio called The Secret Machines and later, the dream pop trio School of Seven Bells. Curtis died on December 29, 2013, from complications of lymphoma.

=== Reunion and reformation ===
On January 5, 2017, the band's official Facebook page teased a possible reunion event. News later confirmed the remaining members would perform at the Homegrown Festival in Dallas on May 13, 2017. On March 9, 2017, they announced four additional Texas dates, making it the first Tripping Daisy tour in nearly twenty years. Christopher Penn announced during Homegrown Fest 8 in Dallas, Texas, on May 13, 2017, that Tripping Daisy would be recording a live album during a concert July 7, 2017, during the NYTEX Summer Concert Series at the NYTEX Sports Centre in North Richland Hills, Texas. The band went idle again until reuniting in 2019 for the 10th Homegrown Festival. Shortly thereafter, the band played a "secret" show at the Dada in Dallas. Dylan Silvers filled in for Curtis during this concert. On August 28, 2022, the band played a surprise show at the Kessler Theater in Dallas.

On June 18, 2024, the Dallas Observer announced that Tripping Daisy had officially reformed, and that the band had plans to tour and record a new album. The band then played at The Factory in Deep Ellum, Dallas on June 29, 2024. In April 2025, the band announced a North American tour to celebrate the 30th anniversary of I Am an Elastic Firecracker, playing the album in full, along with additional songs from their other releases. The Midwest and East Coast leg of the tour ran from June 21 through July 20, 2025; the Southern US and West Coast leg ran from April 24 through May 22, 2026.

== Band members ==
Current members

- Tim DeLaughter – lead vocals, guitar, keyboards (1990–1999, 2017, 2019, 2022, 2024–present)
- Mark Pirro – bass guitar, backing vocals, percussion (1990–1999, 2017, 2019, 2022, 2024–present)
- Bryan Wakeland – drums (1992–1995, 2017, 2019, 2022, 2024–present)
- Philip Karnats – guitar, backing vocals, trumpet, banjo (1997–1999, 2017, 2019, 2022, 2024–present)
- Nick Earl – guitar, backing vocals, samples (2017, 2019, 2022, 2024–present)
- Dylan Silvers – keyboards, guitar, backing vocals (2019, 2022, 2024–present)

Former members

- Wes Berggren – guitar, keyboards (1990–1999; died 1999)
- Jeff Bouck – drums (1990–1992)
- Mitch Marine – drums (1995–1997)
- Ben Curtis – drums (1997–1999; died 2013)
- Brandon Curtis – keyboards, guitar, backing vocals (2017)

Touring substitutes

- Cory Lemons – drums (1995–1996)
- Robert Hubbard – drums (1997–1999)

== Discography ==
=== Albums ===
List of studio albums, with selected chart positions and sales figures
Title	Album details	Peak chart positions					Sales	Certifications
Title	Album details	US	US Heat.	CAN	NZ	UK	Sales	Certifications
Bill	Released: 1992; Label: Dragon Street; Format: CD, CS, LP	—	—	—	—	—	US: 32,000; WW: 60,000	
I Am an Elastic Firecracker	Released: June 20, 1995; Label: Island; Format: CD, CS, LP	95	1	44	43	140	US: 300,000	MC: Platinum
Jesus Hits Like the Atom Bomb	Released: July 7, 1998; Label: Island; Format: CD, CS, 2xLP	—	—	—	—	—		
Tripping Daisy	Released: April 18, 2000; Label: Good Records/Sugar Fix; Format: CD, LP	—	—	—	—	—		
"—" denotes a recording that did not chart or was not released in that territory. "X" denotes a chart that is discontinued.

=== EPs ===
List of studio albums, with selected chart positions and sales figures
Title	Album details
Get It On	Released: June 1994; Label: Island; Format: CD, CS
Hook Music: Vol 1 (Fan club exclusive)	Released: 1996; Label: Self-released; Format: CS
Time Capsule	Released: April 1997; Label: Island; Format: CD, LP
The Tops Off Our Head	Released: 1999; Label: Good Records; Format: CD, LP

=== Demo albums ===
- Tripping Daisy – the shoe demo cassette

=== Singles ===
List of singles, with selected chart positions
Year	Title	Peak chart positions						Album
Year	Title	US Air	US Main	US Mod	AUS	FRA	UK	Album
1992	"Lost and Found"	—	—	—	—	—	—	Bill
1993	"My Umbrella"	—	—	24	—	—	—	Bill
1993	"Blown Away"	—	—	—	—	—	—	Bill
1995	"I Got a Girl"	53	33	6	58	44	141	I Am an Elastic Firecracker
1995	"Piranha"	—	35	32	—	—	72	I Am an Elastic Firecracker
1996	"Trip Along"	—	—	—	—	—	—	I Am an Elastic Firecracker
1998	"Waited a Light Year"	—	—	—	—	—	—	Jesus Hits Like the Atom Bomb
1998	"Sonic Bloom"	—	—	—	—	—	—	Jesus Hits Like the Atom Bomb
1999	"Bedhead"	—	—	—	—	—	—	non-album single
"—" denotes a release that did not chart.
