= Bill (Tripping Daisy album) =

Studio album by Tripping Daisy
- Released: November 1992
- Genre: Alternative rock; grunge; neo-psychedelia
- Length: 51:54
- Label: Dragon Street; Island Red Label
- Producer: Patrick Keel, Tripping Daisy

Tripping Daisy chronology
Bill (1992)	Get It On (1994)

Tripping Daisy studio album chronology
Bill (1992)	I Am an Elastic Firecracker (1995)

Singles from Bill
- 1. "My Umbrella" Released: 1993; 2. "Blown Away" Released: 1993

Professional ratings
Review scores
Source	Rating
AllMusic	3/5 stars
The Encyclopedia of Popular Music	3/5 stars

Bill is the debut studio album American rock band Tripping Daisy. It was first released in November 1992 on the Dragon Street label, and then re-released on July 20, 1993 on the Island Red Label. On the re-release, the track "Green Tambourine" was removed, and the two unlisted tracks were appended to the final track.

The album had sold around 15,000 copies before it was picked up by Island. "My Umbrella" spent two weeks on the Billboard Modern Rock Tracks chart, peaking at No. 24. The album was re-released on vinyl in 2023 as part of the DFW Legacy Series.

== Critical reception ==
Trouser Press wrote that "singer/lyricist Tim DeLaughter’s acrobatic vocals and guitarist Wes Berggren’s propulsive strumming lend Bill enough variety to keep it from sinking into blandlivion-but just barely."

== Track listing ==
Dragon Street release
No.	Title	Length
1.	"My Umbrella"	4:32
2.	"One Through Four"	2:57
3.	"Lost and Found"	3:23
4.	"Change of Mind"	4:33
5.	"On the Ground"	4:14
6.	"The Morning"	2:27
7.	"Blown Away"	4:31
8.	"Brown-Eyed Pickle Boy"	4:50
9.	"Green Tambourine" (The Lemon Pipers cover)	2:17
10.	"Miles and Miles of Pain"	5:41
11.	"Triangle"	5:52
12.	"Piano solo and dead air" (unlisted track)	5:17
13.	"Pink Jelly" (unlisted track)	3:17

Island re-release
No.	Title	Length
1.	"My Umbrella"	4:32
2.	"One Through Four"	2:57
3.	"Lost and Found"	3:23
4.	"Change of Mind"	4:33
5.	"On the Ground"	4:14
6.	"The Morning"	2:27
7.	"Blown Away"	4:31
8.	"Brown-Eyed Pickle Boy"	4:50
9.	"Miles and Miles of Pain"	5:41
10.	"Triangle" (ends at 5:52; contains hidden tracks: piano solo and dead air; Pink Jelly [begins at 11:15])	14:33

== Release history ==
Release history for Bill
Region	Label	Format	Date	Ref
United States	Dragon Street Records	CD	1992	
Various	Island Red Label	CD; cassette	July 20, 1993	
Various	Music on Vinyl	LP	March 23, 2023	
