= I Got a Girl (Tripping Daisy song) =

"i Got a Girl"

Single by Tripping Daisy

from the album I Am an Elastic Firecracker
- Released: June 1995
- Recorded: 1994
- Studio: Water Music Recording Studios, Hoboken, New Jersey
- Genre: Alternative rock
- Length: 4:05
- Label: Island
- Composer: Tripping Daisy
- Lyricist: Tim DeLaughter
- Producers: Ted Niceley; Tripping Daisy

Tripping Daisy singles chronology
"My Umbrella" (1993)	"i Got a Girl" (1995)	"Piranha" (1995)

"i Got a Girl" is a song by alternative rock group Tripping Daisy. Island Records released the song as the lead single from the band's second studio album, I Am an Elastic Firecracker (1995) in June 1995, against the wishes of the band. The song is an ode to Tim DeLaughter's partner, Julie Doyle, and lists off her characteristics.

The song was a commercial success and reached number six on the Billboard Modern Rock Tracks chart, and was the biggest hit of the band's career.

== Track listing ==
1. i Got a Girl – 4:06
2. Noose – 4:50
3. Cause Tomb Shop – 2:37
4. Margarita Tropendzando – 3:53

== Charts ==
Chart (1995–1996)	Peak position
Australia (ARIA)	58
Canada Alternative 30 (RPM)	2
France (SNEP)	44
UK (Official Charts Company)	141
U.S. Billboard Mainstream Rock Tracks	33
U.S. Billboard Modern Rock Tracks	6
