= Wes Berggren =

American musician

- Born: April 3, 1971; Dallas, Texas, U.S.
- Died: October 27, 1999 (aged 28); Dallas, Texas, U.S.
- Genres: Alternative rock; grunge; neo-psychedelia
- Occupation: Musician
- Instrument: Guitar
- Years active: 1991–1999
- Labels: Dragon Street; Island; Good
- Formerly of: Tripping Daisy

Wesley Joseph Berggren (April 3, 1971 – October 27, 1999) was an American musician and former guitarist for the rock band Tripping Daisy.

Berggren was found dead of a drug overdose in his apartment on October 27, 1999, by his wife, Melissa. The Dallas County Medical Examiner's office found traces of cocaine, propoxyphene, and benzodiazepine in his body. With Berggren's death, the band cancelled its upcoming tour dates and finished some minor recording sessions for the final album. The self-titled album was released posthumously, with Berggren's father Don playing a Fender Rhodes electric piano on the unfinished song "Soothing Jubilee".

Tripping Daisy officially disbanded on December 14, 1999. Tim DeLaughter, the singer and founding member, went on to form the Polyphonic Spree, which also features former Tripping Daisy members Mark Pirro and Bryan Wakeland. Benjamin Curtis later became a founding member of the bands Secret Machines, School of Seven Bells, and UFOFU.
