= The Polyphonic Spree =

American indie rock band

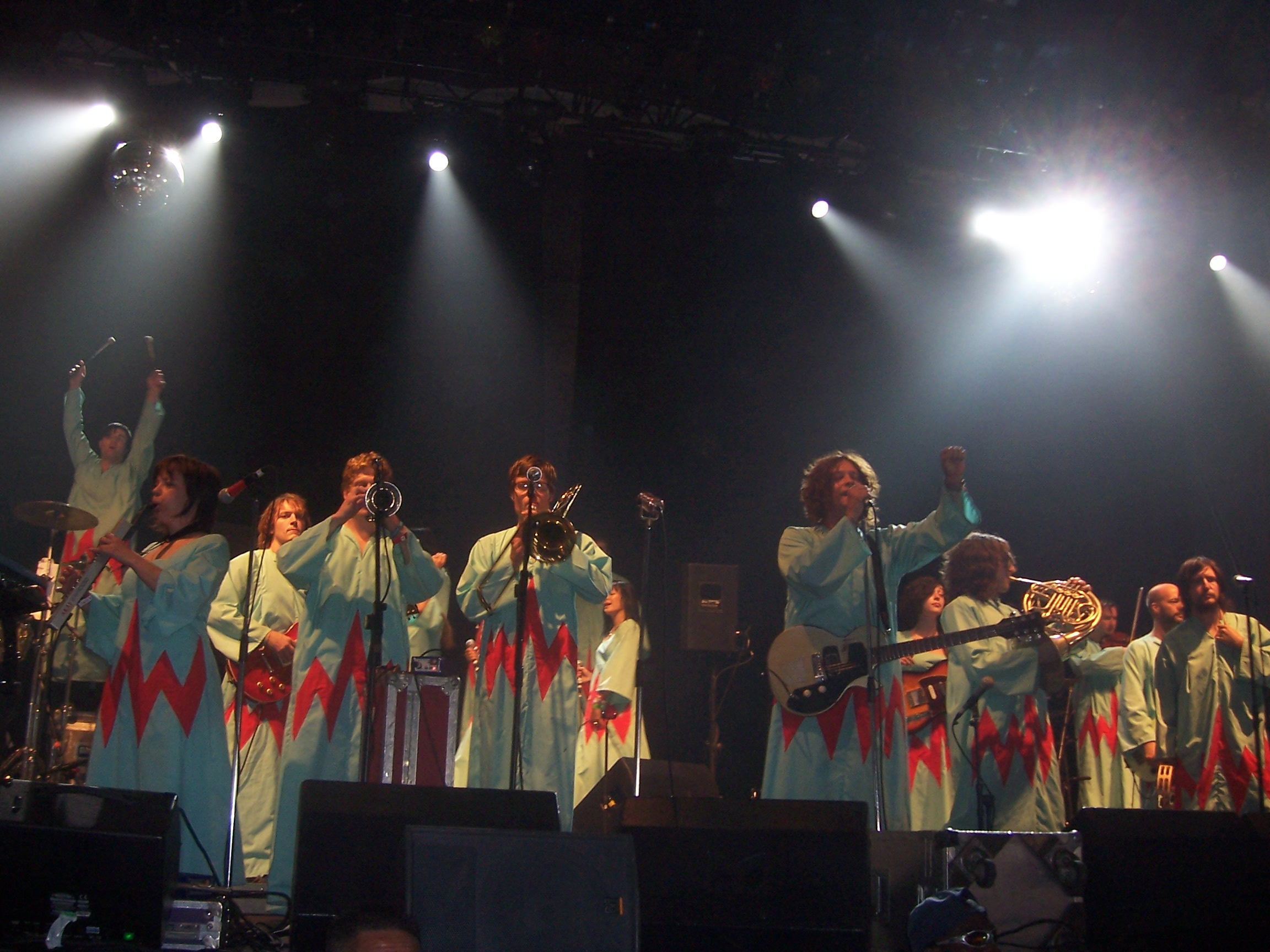
- The Polyphonic Spree at the 2005 V Festival

Background information
- Origin: Dallas, Texas, United States
- Genres: Psychedelic pop; symphonic rock; indie rock
- Years active: 2000–present
- Labels: 679; Hollywood; Good; TVT
- Spinoff of: Tripping Daisy, Mandrake Project
- Website: thepolyphonicspree.com

The Polyphonic Spree is an American choral indie rock band from Dallas, Texas, formed in 2000 by singer and songwriter Tim DeLaughter, formerly of Tripping Daisy. The band's pop and rock songs are augmented by a large vocal choir, and instruments such as flute, trumpet, French horn, trombone, violin, viola, cello, percussion, piano, guitars, bass, drums, electronic keyboards, and EWI.

== History ==
DeLaughter's previous group, Tripping Daisy, came to an abrupt end in 1999 when guitarist Wes Berggren died of a drug overdose. The Polyphonic Spree was formed, in part, in reaction to Berggren's death.

In 2000, DeLaughter collaborated with twelve other musicians to put together a sound that reflected the music he grew up with. He wanted to explore the orchestral palette and pop sensibility of the Beatles, the Beach Boys, Paul McCartney and Wings, Electric Light Orchestra, the Association, the 5th Dimension, and the vocal style of Ozzy Osbourne from Black Sabbath. Within two weeks, The Polyphonic Spree created a 30-minute setlist with them donning their signature white choir robes, and opened for Grandaddy and Bright Eyes.

Shortly after their first show, another twelve musicians joined the band to the point of them becoming a collective, and they recorded The Beginning Stages of ... The Polyphonic Spree, which contained all nine songs (sections) written for their first show plus a tenth track ("Section 10 – Long Day"). The album was intended to serve as a demo recording for booking the band for live performances. As a result of the attention they received from the press and other industry pundits after performing at the South by Southwest music festival in Austin, Texas, the band was invited to perform at London's Meltdown Festival curated by David Bowie in 2002. They opened for The Divine Comedy at the Royal Festival Hall the same year.

In early 2003, they were dropped by their record label, 679 Recordings, for "lack of record sales". About this time, the band began to break into pop culture. The song "Light and Day" was used in a joint Volkswagen Beetle/iPod tie-in advertising campaign, appearing on television commercials nationwide in 2004. The same song was used in a tribute to Bill Walsh during an NFL football preseason special, in an episode of the TV series Scrubs, in Murderball, a documentary about the U.S. wheelchair rugby team, and as the end music for the first series of the BBC Radio 7 sci-fi comedy Undone; the song's video was adapted for the movie Eternal Sunshine of the Spotless Mind (the DVD features a clip). Also during this time the band was invited to be an opening act for Bowie's Reality Tour and again performed at South by Southwest.

In 2004, Hollywood Records released the Spree's second album, Together We're Heavy, in Japan on June 30, Europe on July 12, and North America on July 13, 2004. The band was featured on Scrubs on April 20, 2004, in the episode "My Choosiest Choice of All" (season 3, episode 19); and on the TV show Las Vegas on November 29, 2004, in the episode "Silver Star" (season 2, episode 10). In December 2004, the Polyphonic Spree performed at the Nobel Peace Prize Concert, honoring Wangari Maathai before a worldwide television audience.

2005 saw the release of Thumbsucker, a feature film by Mike Mills, with a score composed by Tim DeLaughter and performed by The Polyphonic Spree.

On June 19, 2007, the band released their third complete album, The Fragile Army, produced by John Congleton. On their 2007 tours The Polyphonic Spree replaced their robes with black army outfits while continuing to don the robes during encores. In July 2007, the song "Running Away" was featured on the Sci-Fi network in commercials for its upcoming season. In the autumn of 2007, Adidas commissioned artists to write theme songs for MLS teams as part of a campaign called "MLS Represent", and the Polyphonic Spree was chosen to write a song for FC Dallas. The result was the song "H-O-O-P-S Yes!" In September 2007, the Polyphonic Spree performed three songs: "Light and Day / Reach for the Sun", "Soldier Girl", and "Light to Follow", at Oscar de la Renta's Spring 2008 Fashion Show for New York Fashion Week. They recorded the opening track to the Showtime series Weeds for season 2 (episode 9), and also contributed to the Hedwig and the Angry Inch and The Nightmare Before Christmas tribute CDs. UK channel Sky Sports used "Running Away" to advertise their spring and summer cricket coverage. UK supermarket Sainsbury's continues to use "Light and Day / Reach for the Sun" for its advertising campaign. It became the most-used song in advertising in the United Kingdom.

In 2009, the band wrote and performed the opening sequence to Showtime's new show The United States of Tara, which stars Toni Collette as a woman with multiple personality disorder. They first performed the song live on their Australian tour, in Adelaide. "Light and Day / Reach for the Sun" was also featured on the "Your UQ" advertising campaign for the University of Queensland.

On July 11, 2011, the band released Bullseye, an interactive music video app for iOS devices featuring the first single from a collection of songs.

"Light and Day / Reach for the Sun" was featured in the movie trailer for the 2012 animated film The Lorax. On October 11, 2012, the band launched a Kickstarter campaign to fund their next studio album, tour, live album, and concert DVD. They reached their funding goal of $100,000 on November 28. The band's Holidaydream: Sounds of the Holidays, Vol. One was released in 2012, featuring an original introduction, outro and Polyphonic Spree cover versions of classic Christmas songs including "Happy Xmas (War Is Over)" and "Let it Snow".

On August 6, 2013, the band played a sold-out concert at London's Village Underground to mark the release of their album Yes, It's True. The performance was broadcast live on Vimeo. A US release show at the Granada Theater in Dallas followed on August 9, and the band toured in support of the album worldwide. A live DVD was released in October 2013, and the band played their famous Holiday Extravaganza in Dallas, Texas on December 21.

In 2014 the band released the studio album Psychphonic.

The Polyphonic Spree headlined the 2015 Big D NYE party, December 31, 2014, at Dallas's Victory Park at the American Airlines Center. The free outdoor concert was attended by a crowd of over 40,000, who gathered for the annual New Year's Eve event. Perhaps because of the 35 °F weather, the choir wore matching winter ponchos, while other musicians wore pajamas. DeLaughter's headgear resembled a Fred Flintstone Grand Poobah lodge hat (tall fur with buffalo horns). Covers included Wings' "Band on the Run" and the Thunderclap Newman hit "Something in the Air". The band occasionally paused to sync with television cues, as the concert was broadcast live to a regional television audience of over 12 million in Texas and surrounding states.

Afflatus was released on April 16, 2021. Afflatus is a cover album featuring songs by bands such as INXS, The Bee Gees, and Rush.

On November 17, 2023, The Polyphonic Spree released their eighth studio album, Salvage Enterprise.

== Discography ==
=== Studio albums ===
List of studio albums, with selected chart positions
Title	Album details	Peak chart positions							
Title	Album details	US	US Heat	US Indie	AUS	IRL	SCO	UK	UK Indie
The Beginning Stages of...	Released: June 4, 2002; Re-released: June 24, 2003; Label: Hollywood/679/Good	—	—	—	—	65	58	70	—
Together We're Heavy	Released: June 30, 2004; Label: Hollywood/Good	121	1	—	85	—	60	61	—
The Fragile Army	Released: June 19, 2007; Label: TVT/Gut/Good	113	1	8	—	—	—	198	21
Holidaydream: Sounds of the Holidays, Vol. One	Released: October 23, 2012; Label: Kirtland/Cherry Red/Good	—	45	—	—	—	—	—	—
Yes, It's True	Released: August 6, 2013; Label: Kirtland/Cherry Red/Good	— (Note: Yes, It's True did not enter the US Billboard 200, but peaked at number 185 on the US Billboard Current Album Sales Chart.)	8	47	—	—	—	176	36
Psychphonic	Released: August 16, 2014; Label: Kirtland	—	—	—	—	—	—	—	—
Afflatus	Released: April 16, 2021; Label: Good	—	—	—	—	—	—	—	—
Salvage Enterprise	Released: November 17, 2023; Label: Good	—	—	—	—	—	—	—	—
"—" denotes album that did not chart or was not released

=== EPs ===
- Soldier Girl (2002) #4 UK (Budget Albums)
- Light & Day (2003)
- Wait EP (2006)
- We Hope It Finds You Well (2020)

=== Singles ===
Title	Year	Peak chart positions				Album
Title	Year	NLD	SCO	UK	UK Indie	Album
"Hanging Around"	2002	—	36	39	—	The Beginning Stages of...
"Light and Day"	2003	—	38	40	—	The Beginning Stages of...
"Soldier Girl"	2003	—	29	26	—	The Beginning Stages of...
"The March"	2003	—	—	—	—	Polyphonic Spree/Grandaddy split
"Hold Me Now"	2004	76	87	72	—	Together We're Heavy
"Two Thousand Places"	2004	—	92	76	—	Together We're Heavy
"Running Away"	2007	—	65	— (Note: "Running Away" did not enter the UK Singles Chart, but peaked at number 52 on the UK Physical Singles Chart Top 100.)	8	The Fragile Army
"We Crawl"	2007	—	—	—	—	The Fragile Army
"Bullseye"	2011	—	—	—	—	Non-album singles
"It's Christmas"	2011	—	—	—	—	Non-album singles
"What Would You Do?"	2012	—	—	—	—	Yes, It's True
"You Don't Know Me"	2013	—	—	—	—	Yes, It's True
"—" denotes recording that did not chart or was not released

=== Live CDs/DVDs ===
- Live From Austin, TX: The Polyphonic Spree (2004)
- Coachella (2006)
- SXSW Live 2007 DVD (2007)
- You + Me - Live in NYC (2013)

=== Film soundtracks ===
- Eternal Sunshine of the Spotless Mind (2004)
- Scrubs (2004)
- Las Vegas (2004)
- Thumbsucker (2005)
- Mozart and the Whale (2005)
- Murderball (2005)
- The Best Man (2005)
- Keeping Up with the Steins (2006)
- Visioneers (2008)
- The Lorax (2012)
- The Big Short (2015)

=== Other ===
- Wig in a Box, "Wig in a Box" (2003)
- Maybe This Christmas Tree, "Happy Christmas (War Is Over)" (2004)
- Follow My Voice: With the Music of Hedwig DVD (2006)
- Nightmare Revisited, "Town Meeting Song" (2008)

== Members ==
Current members

- Tim DeLaughter – lead vocals, guitar, piano, keyboards
- Mark Pirro – bass, backing vocals
- Jessica Jordan – backing vocals
- Kristin Hardin – backing vocals
- Julie Doyle – backing vocals
- Constance Dolph – backing vocals
- Jason Garner – drums
- Stephanie Pirro – backing vocals
- Jennifer Jobe Penn – backing vocals
- Buffi Jacobs – cello
- Leoncarlo Canlas - violin
- Margaret Fischer - flute
- Heather Test – French horn
- Kelly Test – percussion
- Nick Wlodarczyk – trombone
- Nick Earl – guitar
- Evan Weiss – trumpet
- Dylan Silvers – guitar
- Ryan Fitzgerald – guitar, backing vocals
- Poppy Xander – keyboards

Past members (incomplete listing)

- Cassandra Askin – backing vocals
- Josh Guyer – trombone, spoons
- Neil Smith – backing vocals
- Thaddeus Ford – trumpet
- Paul Deemer – trombone, trumpet
- Mike St.Clair – trombone, synth effects
- Sean Redman – violin, mandolin
- Cory Helms – guitar, backing vocals
- Josh Smith – backing vocals, production
- Chris Curiel – trumpet
- Jay Jennings – trumpet
- Darin Hieb – trumpet
- Rachel Woolf – flute
- Victoria Arellano – classical harp
- Allen Halas – percussion
- Tamara Brown – violin
- Elizabeth Brown – backing vocals
- Apotsala Wilson – backing vocals
- Jennie Kelley – backing vocals
- Steven Grimley - backing vocals
- Mark Tucker - steel
- Jenny Kirtland – backing vocals
- Paul Hillery – vinyl backing
- Stephen Dix – vinyl backing
- Rick G. Nelson – viola
- Audrey Easley – flute, piccolo, EWI
- Nick Groesch – piano, keyboards
- Brianne Sargent - cello
- Bach Norwood – piano, keyboards, backing vocals
- Keith Hendricks – percussion
- Evan Hisey – keyboards
- Japhy Ryder – floristry
- Annie Clark – guitar, keyboards, backing vocals
- Regina Chellew – guitar, trumpet, backing vocals
- Daniel Hart – violin
- John Lamonica – percussion
- Stuart "Peebs" Peebles – piccolo
- Marcus Lopez – percussion
- Buster Trimper – percussion
- Matt Bricker – trumpet, synth effects
- Taylor Young – percussion
- Joe Butcher – steel
- Evan Jacobs – piano, keyboards
- Chris Alan – guitar, vocals
- Egbert St. Pierre – piano, harpsichord
- Todd Berridge – viola
- Elizabeth Evans – backing vocals
- Jessica Berridge – backing vocals
- Melisma MacDonald – backing vocals
- Edwin Mendoza – viola
- Joseph Singleton – viola
- Timothy Blowers – harp
- Anthony Richards – steel drums
- Louis Schwadron – French horn
- Andrew Tinker – French horn
- Chandler Petrino – Natural horn, oboe
- Timothy Matthews – mbira
- Paul Gaughran – flute
- Brian Teasley – drums, percussion
- Corn Mo – keyboards, backing vocals
- James Reimer – trombone
- Brad Butler – backing vocals
- Toby Halbrooks – theremin
- Drew Brandon Hunziker - utility
- Merritt Lota – steel drums
- Frank Benjaminsen – backing vocals
- Mark Beardsworth – claviola
- Isabelo Cruz – French horn
- Teruel te Shrĳmp - backing vocals
- Mike Elio – backing vocals
- Kelly Repka – backing vocals
- Jason Rees – backing vocals
- Jeneffa Soldatic – backing vocals
- Michael Turner – backing vocals
- Mike Mordecai – percussion
- Don Congeler – backing vocals
- Michael Musick – backing vocals
- Melissa Crutchfield – backing vocals
- Sandra Powers Giasson – backing vocals
- Daniel Huffman – guitar
- Andrew Aldenenotti – backing vocals
- Bryan Wakeland – drums
- Ross Cink - backing vocals
- Josh David Jordan – backing vocals
- Jared Pechonis – theremin
- Szabolcs Szczur – accordion
- Harriet Ballance - backing vocals
- Lucy Williams - choreography
- Natalie Young – backing vocals
- Jenelle Valencia – violin
- Roy Thomas Ivy – backing vocals
- Jamey Welch – backing vocals
- Daniel Ford – backing vocals
- Crispin Parry – backing vocals
- Ethan Voelkers – backing vocals
- Hayley McCarthy – viola
- Christine Bolon – backing vocals
- Dave Dusters – percussion, backing vocals
- Billy Mills-Curran – flute
- Logan Keese – trumpet
- Ricky Rasura – classical harp
- Todd Beaupré – vibraslap
- Tonya Hewitt – banjo
- Andy Parkerson – clarinet
- Patrick Hewitt – theremin
- Carlos Jackson; keyboards, percussion, backing vocals
- Paul Jones – follower
- Gary Jones – follower
- Theodore Cruz – follower
