= Good Records =

- Founder: Tim DeLaughter Julie A Doyle
- Country of origin: United States
- Location: Dallas, Texas

Good Records is a record label formed by Julie A. Doyle and Tim DeLaughter, the lead singer of The Polyphonic Spree and the alternative-rock band Tripping Daisy. It has its own record store in Dallas, Texas.

== Artists ==
- Tripping Daisy
- The Polyphonic Spree
- Pilotdrift
- Preteen Zenith
- Grandaddy
- My Name is Moses
- Philip E. Karnats
- Binary Sunrise
- Sweet Lee Morrow
- Burgess Meredith

== See also ==
- List of record labels
