= Tim DeLaughter =

American musician (born 1965)

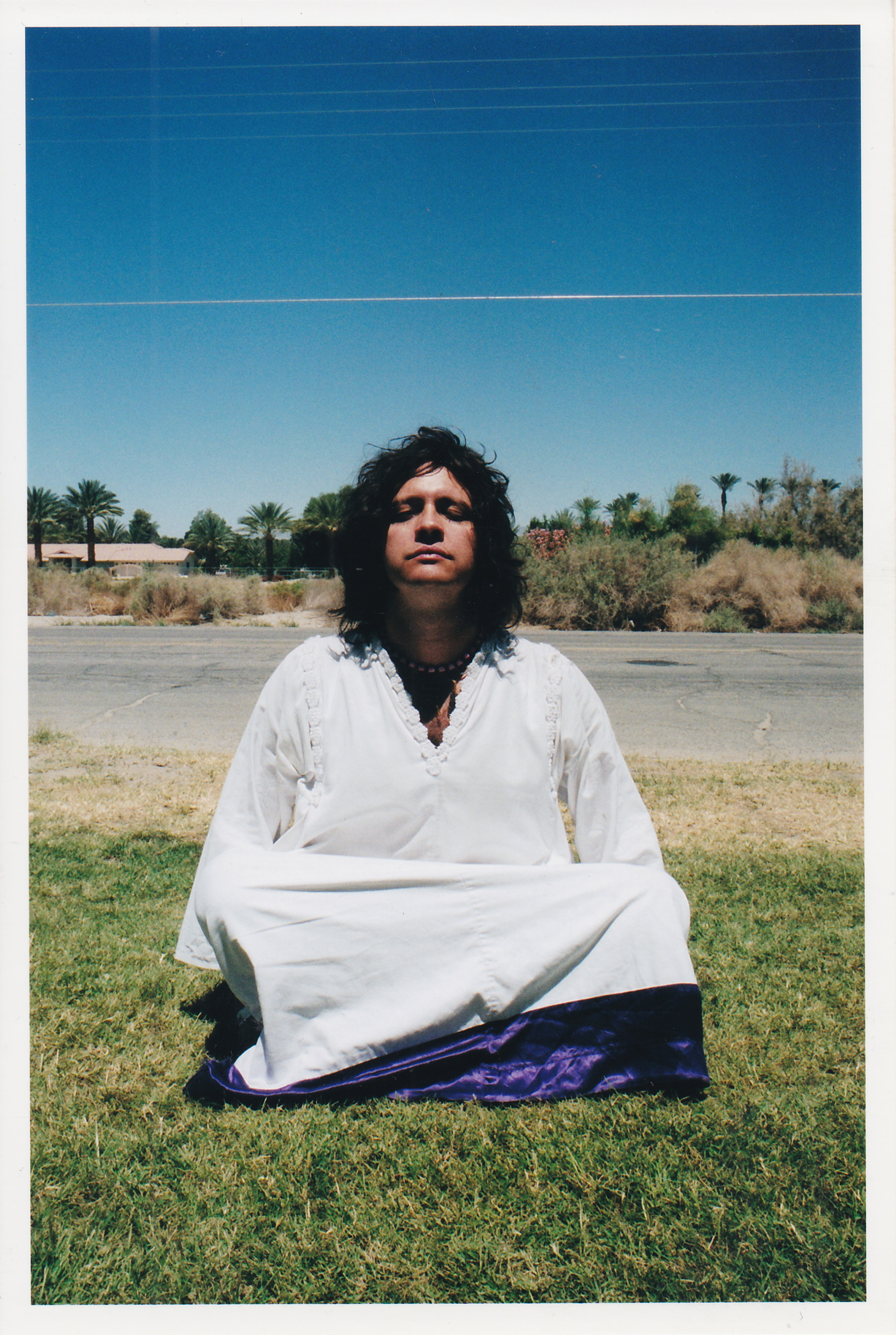
- DeLaughter whilst frontman of the Polyphonic Spree

Background information
- Born: November 18, 1965 (age 60); Dallas, Texas, U.S.
- Genre: Rock
- Occupation: Musician
- Instruments: Vocals, guitar, keyboards
- Years active: 1990–present
- Label: Good Records

Tim DeLaughter (born November 18, 1965) is an American rock musician. He is the frontman of the bands Tripping Daisy, The Polyphonic Spree, and Preteen Zenith.

At the 61st Primetime Creative Arts Emmy Awards, DeLaughter was nominated for Outstanding Original Main Title Theme Music for his work on the television series United States of Tara.

== Music career ==
As a teenager, DeLaughter played in various Duncanville bands as a drummer. However, he was poor at the instrument and began teaching himself to sing and play guitar.

He formed Tripping Daisy in 1990, which disbanded in 1999 following the death of guitarist Wes Berggren. The next year, DeLaughter formed The Polyphonic Spree. He and other members of Tripping Daisy and The Polyphonic Spree formed Preteen Zenith in 2011.

=== Musical style ===
Music critic Mike Boehm described DeLaughter's singing style as a "nasally vocal blend of Ozzy Osbourne and Perry Farrell". The Boston Globe's Joan Anderman described him as "sounding like Wayne Coyne of the Flaming Lips starring in a stoner production of Godspell".

== Personal life ==
DeLaughter has no siblings and his parents divorced when he was a child. His grandfather was a Southern Baptist preacher.

DeLaughter and his wife, Julie Doyle, met while they were students at Duncanville High School. Their fourth child was born in December 2006. Doyle is also a member of The Polyphonic Spree.
