= List of awards and nominations received by Catalina Sandino Moreno =

Catalina Sandino Moreno awards and nominations
Awards and nominations
Award	Wins	Nominations
Academy Awards	0	1
Berlin International Film Festival	1	1
Critics' Choice Movie Award	0	1
Colombian Cinema Award	1	1
Chicago Film Critics Association	1	1
Dallas–Fort Worth Film Critics Association	0	1
Gotham Awards	1	1
Imagen Foundation Awards	2	2
Independent Spirit Awards	1	1
London Film Critics' Circle	0	1
Los Angeles Film Critics Association	1	1
Nashville Film Festival	1	1
Online Film Critics Society	1	1
Premios ACE	1	1
Satellite Award	0	1
Screen Actors Guild Award	0	1
Seattle Film Critics Awards	0	1
Seattle International Film Festival	1	1
ShoWest Convention	1	1

Totals (Note: Certain award groups do not simply award one winner. They acknowledge several different recipients, have runners-up, and have third place. Since this is a specific recognition and is different from losing an award, runner-up mentions are considered wins in this award tally. For simplification and to avoid errors, each award in this list has been presumed to have had a prior nomination.)
- Wins: 16
- Nominations: 25

The following is a list of awards and nominations received by Colombian actress and producer Catalina Sandino Moreno.

== Academy Awards ==
Year	Category	Film	Result
2005	Best Actress	Maria Full of Grace	Nominated

== Berlin International Film Festival ==
Year	Category	Film	Result
2004	Best Actress	Maria Full of Grace	Won

== Critics' Choice Movie Award ==
Year	Category	Film	Result
2005	Best Actress	Maria Full of Grace	Nominated

== Colombian Cinema Award ==
Year	Category	Film	Result
2004	Best Actress	Maria Full of Grace	Won

== Chicago Film Critics Association Awards ==
Year	Category	Film	Result
2004	Most Promising Performer	Maria Full of Grace	Won

== Dallas-Fort Worth Film Critics Association Awards ==
Year	Category	Film	Result
2004	Best Actress	Maria Full of Grace	Nominated

== Gotham Awards ==
Year	Category	Film	Result
2004	Breakthrough Performance	Maria Full of Grace	Won

== Imagen Foundation Awards ==
Year	Category	Film	Result
2005	Best Actress - Film	Maria Full of Grace	Won
2014	Best Supporting Actress/Television	The Bridge	Won
2017	Best Actress/Television	Custody	Nominated

== Independent Spirit Awards ==
Year	Category	Film	Result
2004	Best Female Lead	Maria Full of Grace	Won

== London Critics Circle Film Awards ==
Year	Category	Film	Result
2005	Actress of the Year	Maria Full of Grace	Nominated

== Los Angeles Film Critics Association Awards ==
Year	Category	Film	Result
2004	New Generation Award	Maria Full of Grace	Won

== Nashville Film Festival ==
Year	Category	Film	Result
2014	New Director's Competition - Best Actress	Medeas	Won

== Online Film Critics Society Awards ==
Year	Category	Film	Result
2004	Best Breakthrough Performance	Maria Full of Grace	Won

== Satellite Awards ==
Year	Category	Film	Result
2004	Best Actress in a Motion Picture, Drama	Maria Full of Grace	Nominated

== Screen Actors Guild Awards ==
Year	Category	Film	Result
2004	Outstanding Performance by a Female Actor in a Leading Role	Maria Full of Grace	Nominated

== Seattle Film Critics Awards ==
Year	Category	Film	Result
2004	Best Actress	Maria Full of Grace	Nominated

== Seattle International Film Festival ==
Year	Category	Film	Result
2004	Best Actress	Maria Full of Grace	Won
