= List of accolades received by The Aviator (2004 film) =

The 2004 film The Aviator was nominated for eleven Academy Awards, and went on to win five, including Best Supporting Actress for Cate Blanchett. It also won the BAFTA Award for Best Film and Golden Globe Award for Best Motion Picture – Drama.

== Organizations ==
Organization	Award category	Recipients	Result
Academy Awards	Best Picture	Graham King and Michael Mann	Nominated
Academy Awards	Best Director	Martin Scorsese	Nominated
Academy Awards	Best Actor	Leonardo DiCaprio	Nominated
Academy Awards	Best Supporting Actor	Alan Alda	Nominated
Academy Awards	Best Supporting Actress	Cate Blanchett	Won
Academy Awards	Best Original Screenplay	John Logan	Nominated
Academy Awards	Best Art Direction	Dante Ferretti and Francesca Lo Schiavo	Won
Academy Awards	Best Cinematography	Robert Richardson	Won
Academy Awards	Best Costume Design	Sandy Powell	Won
Academy Awards	Best Film Editing	Thelma Schoonmaker	Won
Academy Awards	Best Sound Mixing	Tom Fleischman and Petur Hliddal	Nominated
BAFTA Awards	Best Film	Sandy Climan, Charles Evans Jr., Graham King, and Michael Mann	Won
BAFTA Awards	Best Director	Martin Scorsese	Nominated
BAFTA Awards	Best Original Screenplay	John Logan	Nominated
BAFTA Awards	Best Actor in a Leading Role	Leonardo DiCaprio	Nominated
BAFTA Awards	Best Actor in a Supporting Role	Alan Alda	Nominated
BAFTA Awards	Best Actress in a Supporting Role	Cate Blanchett	Won
BAFTA Awards	Best Cinematography	Robert Richardson	Nominated
BAFTA Awards	Best Production Design	Dante Ferretti	Won
BAFTA Awards	Best Costume Design	Sandy Powell	Nominated
BAFTA Awards	Best Film Music	Howard Shore	Nominated
BAFTA Awards	Best Editing	Thelma Schoonmaker	Nominated
BAFTA Awards	Best Makeup and Hair	Kathryn Blondell, Sian Grigg, and Morag Ross	Won
BAFTA Awards	Best Sound	Tom Fleischman, Eugene Gearty, Petur Hliddal, and Philip Stockton	Nominated
BAFTA Awards	Best Visual Effects	Matthew Gratzner, Robert Legato, R. Bruce Steinheimer and Peter Travers	Nominated
Golden Eagle Award	Best Foreign Language Film	The Aviator	Won
Golden Globe Awards	Best Motion Picture – Drama	The Aviator	Won
Golden Globe Awards	Best Director	Martin Scorsese	Nominated
Golden Globe Awards	Best Screenplay	John Logan	Nominated
Golden Globe Awards	Best Actor – Drama	Leonardo DiCaprio	Won
Golden Globe Awards	Best Supporting Actress	Cate Blanchett	Nominated
Golden Globe Awards	Best Original Score	Howard Shore	Won
Grammy Awards	Best Score Soundtrack Album – Film, Television or Other Visual Media	Howard Shore	Nominated
Satellite Awards	Best Film – Drama	The Aviator	Nominated
Satellite Awards	Best Director	Martin Scorsese	Nominated
Satellite Awards	Best Screenplay – Original	John Logan	Nominated
Satellite Awards	Best Actress in a Supporting Role – Drama	Cate Blanchett	Nominated
Satellite Awards	Best Art Direction & Production Design	Dante Ferretti and Francesca Lo Schiavo	Nominated
Satellite Awards	Best Costume Design	Sandy Powell	Nominated
Satellite Awards	Best Cinematography	Robert Richardson	Nominated
Satellite Awards	Best Original Score	Howard Shore	Nominated
Satellite Awards	Best Editing	Thelma Schoonmaker	Nominated
Satellite Awards	Best Sound	Tom Fleischman, Eugene Gearty, Petur Hliddal, and Philip Stockton	Nominated
Satellite Awards	Best Visual Effects	Matthew Gratzner, Robert Legato, Bruce Steinheimer, and Peter Travers (tied with Andy Brown and Kirsty Millar for House of Flying Daggers)	Won
World Soundtrack Awards	Best Original Soundtrack of the Year	Howard Shore	Nominated
World Soundtrack Awards	Soundtrack Composer of the Year	Howard Shore	Nominated

== Guilds ==
Guild	Award category	Recipients	Result
American Cinema Editors	Best Editing – Drama Film	Thelma Schoonmaker	Won
American Society of Cinematographers	Outstanding Cinematography	Robert Richardson	Nominated
Art Directors Guild	Excellence in Production Design – Fantasy or Period Film		Nominated
Cinema Audio Society	Outstanding Sound Mixing	Tom Fleischman and Petur Hliddal	Won
Costume Designers Guild	Excellence in Period/Fantasy Film	Sandy Powell	Nominated
Directors Guild of America	Outstanding Directing	Martin Scorsese	Nominated
Directors Guild of Great Britain	Outstanding Directing – International Film	Martin Scorsese	Nominated
Motion Picture Sound Editors	Best Sound Editing in Domestic Features – Sound Effects & Foley		Won
Motion Picture Sound Editors	Best Sound Editing in Domestic Features – ADR & Dialogue		Nominated
Motion Picture Sound Editors	Best Sound Editing – Music Film	Jennifer Dunnington	Nominated
Producers Guild of America	Motion Picture Producer of the Year	Graham King and Michael Mann	Won
Screen Actors Guild	Outstanding Actor in a Leading Role	Leonardo DiCaprio	Nominated
Screen Actors Guild	Outstanding Actress in a Supporting Role	Cate Blanchett	Won
Screen Actors Guild	Outstanding Cast	The Aviator	Nominated
Visual Effects Society	Outstanding Actor or Actress – Visual Effects Film	Leonardo DiCaprio	Nominated
Visual Effects Society	Outstanding Models and Miniatures	Adam Gelbart, Matthew Gratzner, Leigh-Alexandra Jacob and Scott Schneider (for the XF11 crash)	Won
Visual Effects Society	Outstanding Single Visual Effect of the Year	Ron Ames, Robert Legato, David Seager and Peter Travers (for the Hell's Angels)	Nominated
Visual Effects Society	Outstanding Special Effects in Service to Visual Effects	Matthew Gratzner Robert Spurlock, Bruce Steinheimer and Richard Stutsman	Won
Visual Effects Society	Outstanding Supporting Visual Effects	Ron Ames, Robert Legato, Matthew Gratzner and Peter Travers	Won
Writers Guild of America	Best Screenplay – Original	John Logan	Nominated

== Critics groups ==
Guild	Award category	Recipients	Result
Broadcast Film Critics	Best Film	The Aviator	Nominated
Broadcast Film Critics	Best Director	Martin Scorsese	Won
Broadcast Film Critics	Best Writer	John Logan	Nominated
Broadcast Film Critics	Best Actor in a Leading Role	Leonardo DiCaprio	Nominated
Broadcast Film Critics	Best Actress in a Supporting Role	Cate Blanchett	Nominated
Broadcast Film Critics	Best Composer	Howard Shore	Won
Chicago Film Critics	Best Cinematography	Robert Richardson (tied with Christopher Doyle for Ying xiong)	Won
Chicago Film Critics	Best Original Score	Howard Shore	Won
Dallas-Fort Worth Film Critics	Best Director	Martin Scorsese	Won
Los Angeles Film Critics	Best Production Design	Dante Ferretti	Won
Online Film Critics	Best Director	Martin Scorsese	Nominated
Online Film Critics	Best Actor in a Leading Role	Leonardo DiCaprio	Nominated
Online Film Critics	Best Actress in a Supporting Role	Cate Blanchett	Won
Online Film Critics	Best Cinematography	Robert Richardson	Nominated
Online Film Critics	Best Original Score	Howard Shore	Nominated
Online Film Critics	Best Editing	Thelma Schoonmaker	Nominated
San Diego Film Critics	Best Production Design	Dante Ferretti	Won
Washington D.C. Area Film Critics	Best Actress in a Supporting Role	Cate Blanchett	Won
