= List of accolades received by Eternal Sunshine of the Spotless Mind =

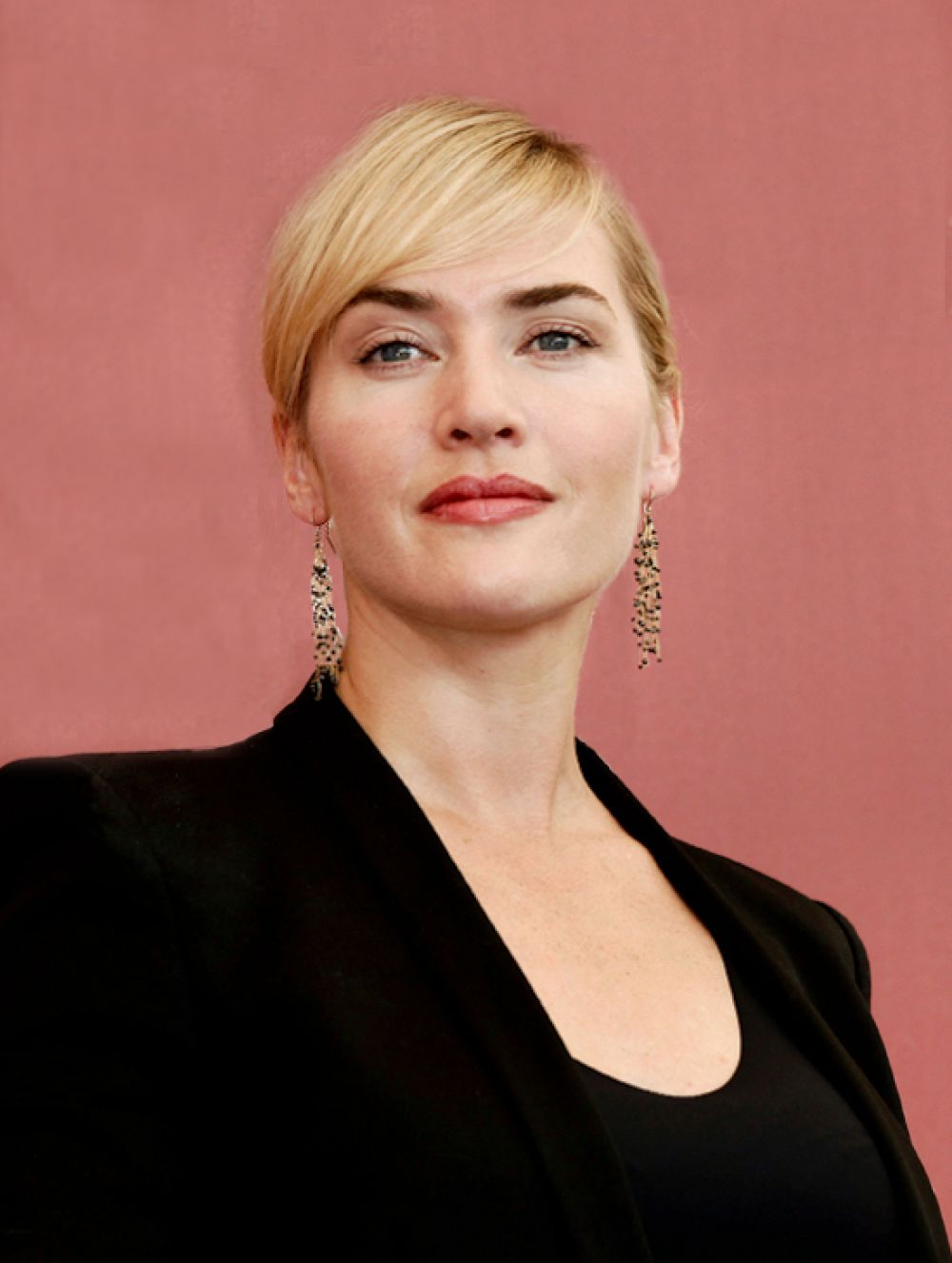
- Kate Winslet received many awards and nominations for her lead acting role in the film.
Accolades
Award	Won	Nominated
Academy Awards	1	2
American Cinema Editors	0	1
Austin Film Critics Association	1	1
AFI	1	2
Art Directors Guild	0	1
Bram Stoker Awards	1	1
Belgian Syndicate of Cinema Critics	0	1
Bodil Awards	0	1
Boston Society of Film Critics	0	1
British Academy Film Awards	2	6
Broadcast Film Critics Association Awards	0	3
Czech Lions	0	1
Cesar Awards	0	1
Costume Designers Guild	0	1
Dallas–Fort Worth Film Critics Association	0	2
Deauville Film Festival	1	2
Directors Guild of Great Britain	0	1
Empire Awards	1	3
European Film Awards	0	1
Film Critics Circle of Australia	0	1
Flanders International Film Festival Ghent	1	1
Golden Globe Awards	0	4
Golden Trailer Awards	0	1
Grande Prêmio do Cinema Brasileiro	0	1
Gotham Independent Film Awards	1	2
Grammy Awards	0	1
Hugo Awards	0	1
Kansas City Film Critics Circle	1	1
London Film Critics Circle Awards	2	4
Los Angeles Film Critics Association	0	1
Motion Picture Sound Editors	1	1
National Board of Review	1	1
National Society of Film Critics Awards	0	1
New York Film Critics Circle Awards	0	3
New York Film Critics Online	1	1
Online Film Critics Society	4	8
People's Choice Awards	0	4
PEN Literary Awards	1	1
Santa Barbara International Film Festival	1	1
San Diego Film Critics Society	2	2
Satellite Awards	0	3
Saturn Awards	1	6
Seattle Film Critics Society	1	1
Science Fiction and Fantasy Writers of America	0	1
Screen Actors Guild Awards	0	1
Southeastern Film Critics Association Awards	1	2
Toronto Film Critics Association	2	2
Visual Effects Society	0	1
Washington D.C. Area Film Critics Association	4	4
World Soundtrack Awards	0	2
Writers Guild of America	1	1
- Total number of awards and nominations
Totals	34	97
- References

Eternal Sunshine of the Spotless Mind is a 2004 American romantic science–fiction comedy–drama film written by Charlie Kaufman and directed by Michel Gondry. Jim Carrey and Kate Winslet lead the ensemble as an estranged couple who have each other erased from their memories. The film was released in theatres on March 19, 2004, by Focus Features and has since gained cult status. It has grossed over $72 million at box office worldwide.

The film received strong critical reviews for its plot structure and performances and received various accolades in different award categories. At 77th Academy Awards, the film won Academy Award for Best Original Screenplay for Kauffman, Gondry and Pierre Bismuth. The film received Best Original Screenplay award, including those given by Writers Guild of America, National Board of Review, London Film Critics, and BAFTA, where it additionally won BAFTA Award for Best Editing along with four other nominations including, BAFTA Award for Best Actor in a Leading Role and BAFTA Award for Best Actress in a Leading Role for Carrey and Winslet, respectively.

Both Carrey and Winslet were recognized for their performance and earned several Best Actor and Best Actress nominations apart from BAFTA, including from Golden Globe Awards, Satellite Awards, and Saturn Awards. In addition, Winslet also received Academy Award for Best Actress nomination and went on to win Best Actress award from Empire Awards, London Film Critics, and Online Film Critics Society, among others. Premiere magazine named Winslet's portrayal of Clementine Kruczynski in the film as the 81st greatest film performance of all time.

The film also received nominations from Grammy Awards, César Awards, and AFI. American Film Institute nominated the film for AFI's 100 Years...100 Movies (10th Anniversary Edition) and AFI's 10 Top 10 – Science Fiction Films. Time Out New York ranked the film as the third–best of the decade, while Writers Guild of America awarded the film Best Original Screenplay and ranked the film at #24 on its list of "101 Greatest Screenplays" in 2013.

== Awards and nominations ==
=== Organizations ===
Organization	Award category	Recipients	Result	Ref(s)
Academy Awards	Best Actress in a Leading Role	Kate Winslet	Nominated	
Academy Awards	Best Original Screenplay	Pierre Bismuth, Michel Gondry and Charlie Kaufman	Won	
Australian Film Institute (AFI)	Best Foreign Film	Anthony Bregman and Steve Golin	Nominated	
Australian Film Institute (AFI)	Movie of the Year	Charlie Kaufman	Won	
British Academy Film Awards (BAFTA)	Best Film	Anthony Bregman and Steve Golin	Nominated	
British Academy Film Awards (BAFTA)	Best Director	Michel Gondry	Nominated	
British Academy Film Awards (BAFTA)	Best Actor in a Leading Role	Jim Carrey	Nominated	
British Academy Film Awards (BAFTA)	Best Actress in a Leading Role	Kate Winslet	Nominated	
British Academy Film Awards (BAFTA)	Best Screenplay – Original	Charlie Kaufman	Won	
British Academy Film Awards (BAFTA)	Best Editing	Valdís Óskarsdóttir	Won	
Czech Lions	Best Foreign Film	Michel Gondry	Nominated	
César Awards	Best Foreign Film	Michel Gondry	Nominated	
Empire Awards	Best Director	Michel Gondry	Nominated	
Empire Awards	Best Actor	Jim Carrey	Nominated	
Empire Awards	Best British Actress	Kate Winslet	Won	
European Film Awards	Best Non–European Film	Michel Gondry	Nominated	
Golden Globe Awards	Best Film – Musical or Comedy		Nominated	
Golden Globe Awards	Best Actor in a Leading Role – Musical or Comedy	Jim Carrey	Nominated	
Golden Globe Awards	Best Actress in a Leading Role – Musical or Comedy	Kate Winslet	Nominated	
Golden Globe Awards	Best Screenplay	Charlie Kaufman	Nominated	
Golden Trailer Awards	Most Original Trailer Award		Nominated	
Grande Prêmio do Cinema Brasileiro	Best Foreign Film		Nominated	
Gotham Awards	Best Film	Michel Gondry	Nominated	
Gotham Awards	Celebrate New York Award	Michel Gondry	Won	
Grammy Awards	Best Score Soundtrack Album – Film, Television or Other Visual Media	Jon Brion	Nominated	
Hugo Awards	Best Dramatic Presentation – Long Form	Michel Gondry, Charlie Kaufman, and Pierre Bismuth	Nominated	
PEN Literary Awards	Best Screenplay	Charlie Kaufman	Won	
Satellite Awards	Best Actor in a Leading Role – Musical or Comedy	Jim Carrey	Nominated	
Satellite Awards	Best Actress in a Leading Role – Musical or Comedy	Kate Winslet	Nominated	
Satellite Awards	Best Visual Effects	Michele Ferrone and Louis Morin	Nominated	
Saturn Award	Best Sci–Fi Film	Charlie Kaufman	Won	
Saturn Award	Best Director	Michel Gondry	Nominated	
Saturn Award	Best Actor	Jim Carrey	Nominated	
Saturn Award	Best Actress	Kate Winslet	Nominated	
Saturn Award	Best Screenplay	Charlie Kaufman	Nominated	
Saturn Award	Best DVD Special Edition Release		Nominated	
Science Fiction and Fantasy Writers of America	Best Script	Charlie Kaufman and Michel Gondry	Nominated	
World Soundtrack Awards	Best Original Soundtrack of the Year	Jon Brion	Nominated	
World Soundtrack Awards	Discovery of the Year	Jon Brion	Nominated	

=== Guilds ===
Guild	Award category	Recipients	Result	Ref(s)
American Cinema Editors	Best Edited Feature Film – Musical or Comedy	Valdís Óskarsdóttir	Nominated	
Art Directors Guild	Excellence in Production Design – Contemporary Film	Hinju Kim, Dan Leigh, Scott Murphy and David Stein	Nominated	
Costume Designers Guild	Excellence in Costume Design – Contemporary Film	Melissa Toth	Nominated	
Directors Guild of Great Britain	Outstanding Directorial Achievement – International Film	Michel Gondry	Nominated	
Motion Picture Sound Editors	Best Sound Editing in Domestic Features – Dialogue & ADR	Eugene Gearty, Hal Levinsohn, Marissa Littlefield, Fred Rosenberg and Philip Stockton	Won	
Screen Actors Guild	Outstanding Actress in a Leading Role	Kate Winslet	Nominated	
Visual Effects Society	Outstanding Supporting Visual Effects – Motion Picture	Mark Dornfeld and Louis Morin	Nominated	
Writers Guild of America	Best Screenplay – Original	Pierre Bismuth, Michel Gondry and Charlie Kaufman	Won	

=== Film festivals ===
Festival	Award category	Recipients	Result	Ref(s)
Deauville Film Festival	Grand Special Prize	Michel Gondry	Nominated	
Deauville Film Festival	"Première" Audience Award	Michel Gondry	Won	
Flanders International Film Festival Ghent	Youth Jury Award	Michel Gondry	Won	
Santa Barbara Film Festival	Outstanding Performance Award	Kate Winslet	Won	

=== Critics groups ===
Group	Award category	Recipients	Result	Ref(s)
Austin Film Critics	Best Film of the Decade (awarded in 2009)		Won	
Bram Stoker Awards	Best Screenplay	Charlie Kaufman, Michel Gondry and Pierre Bismuth (tied with Shaun of the Dead)	Won	
Belgian Syndicate of Cinema Critics	Grand Prix		Nominated	
Bodil Awards	Best American Film	Michel Gondry	Nominated	
Boston Society of Film Critics	Best Screenplay	Charlie Kaufman	Runner-up	
Broadcast Film Critics	Best Film		Nominated	
Broadcast Film Critics	Best Actress in Leading Role	Kate Winslet	Nominated	
Broadcast Film Critics	Best Writer	Charlie Kaufman	Nominated	
Dallas–Fort Worth Film Critics Association	Best Picture		5th Place	
Dallas–Fort Worth Film Critics Association	Best Actress	Kate Winslet	3rd Place	
Film Critics Circle of Australia	Best Foreign Film – English Language	Michel Gondry	Nominated	
Kansas City Film Critics	Best Screenplay Original	Charlie Kaufman	Won	
London Film Critics	Film of the Year		Nominated	
London Film Critics	Director of the Year	Michel Gondry	Nominated	
London Film Critics	British Actress of the Year	Kate Winslet (tied with Eva Birthistle for Ae Fond Kiss...)	Won	
London Film Critics	Screenwriter of the Year	Charlie Kaufman	Won	
Los Angeles Film Critics Association	Best Screenplay	Charlie Kaufman	Runner-up	
National Board of Review	Best Screenplay – Original	Charlie Kaufman	Won	
National Society of Film Critics	Best Screenplay	Charlie Kaufman	Runner-up	
New York Film Critics Circle Awards	Best Film		Runner-up	
New York Film Critics Circle Awards	Best Actress	Kate Winslet	Runner-up	
New York Film Critics Circle Awards	Best Screenplay	Charlie Kaufman	Runner-up	
New York Film Critics Online	Best Screenplay	Charlie Kaufman	Won	
Online Film Critics Society	Best Film		Nominated	
Online Film Critics Society	Best Director	Michel Gondry	Won	
Online Film Critics Society	Best Actor in a Leading Role	Jim Carrey	Nominated	
Online Film Critics Society	Best Actress in a Leading Role	Kate Winslet	Won	
Online Film Critics Society	Best Screenplay – Original	Pierre Bismuth, Michel Gondry and Charlie Kaufman	Won	
Online Film Critics Society	Best Editing	Valdís Óskarsdóttir	Won	
Online Film Critics Society	Best Cinematography	Ellen Kuras	Won	
Online Film Critics Society	Best Original Score	Jon Brion	Nominated	
San Diego Film Critics	Best Actor in a Leading Role	Jim Carrey	Won	
San Diego Film Critics	Best Editing	Valdís Óskarsdóttir	Won	
Seattle Film Critics	Best Screenplay – Original	Charlie Kaufman	Won	
Southeastern Film Critics	Best Screenplay – Original	Charlie Kaufman	Won	
Toronto Film Critics	Best Director	Michel Gondry	Won	
Toronto Film Critics	Best Screenplay	Charlie Kaufman	Won	
Washington D.C. Area Film Critics	Best Film		Won	
Washington D.C. Area Film Critics	Best Director	Michel Gondry	Won	
Washington D.C. Area Film Critics	Best Screenplay – Original	Charlie Kaufman	Won	
Washington D.C. Area Film Critics	Best Cast		Won	

=== Audience Award ===
Group	Award category	Recipients	Result	Ref(s)
People's Choice Awards	Favorite Motion Picture		Nominated	
People's Choice Awards	Favorite Leading Man	Jim Carrey	Nominated	
People's Choice Awards	Favorite Leading Lady	Kate Winslet	Nominated	
People's Choice Awards	Favorite On–Screen Chemistry	Kate Winslet and Jim Carrey	Nominated	
