= Washington D.C. Area Film Critics Association Award for Best Director =

Annual US film award

The Washington D.C. Area Film Critics Association Award for Best Director is an annual award given by the Washington D.C. Area Film Critics Association.

== Winners ==
=== 2000s ===
Year	Director(s)	Film
2002	Spike Jonze (tie)	Adaptation.
2002	Sam Mendes (tie)	Road to Perdition
2002	Denzel Washington (tie)	Antwone Fisher
2002	Peter Jackson	The Lord of the Rings: The Two Towers
2002	Rob Marshall	Chicago
2003	Peter Jackson	The Lord of the Rings: The Return of the King
2003	Sofia Coppola	Lost in Translation
2003	Clint Eastwood	Mystic River
2003	Fernando Meirelles and Kátia Lund	City of God
2003	Peter Weir	Master and Commander: The Far Side of the World
2004	Michel Gondry	Eternal Sunshine of the Spotless Mind
2005	Steven Spielberg	Munich
2005	George Clooney	Good Night, and Good Luck.
2005	Ron Howard	Cinderella Man
2005	Ang Lee	Brokeback Mountain
2005	Fernando Meirelles	The Constant Gardener
2006	Martin Scorsese	The Departed
2007	Joel Coen and Ethan Coen	No Country for Old Men
2008	Danny Boyle	Slumdog Millionaire
2009	Kathryn Bigelow	The Hurt Locker
2009	Lee Daniels	Precious
2009	Clint Eastwood	Invictus
2009	Jason Reitman	Up in the Air
2009	Quentin Tarantino	Inglourious Basterds

=== 2010s ===
Year	Director(s)	Film
2010	David Fincher	The Social Network
2010	Darren Aronofsky	Black Swan
2010	Danny Boyle	127 Hours
2010	Joel Coen and Ethan Coen	True Grit
2010	Christopher Nolan	Inception
2011	Martin Scorsese	Hugo
2011	Woody Allen	Midnight in Paris
2011	Michel Hazanavicius	The Artist
2011	Alexander Payne	The Descendants
2011	Nicolas Winding Refn	Drive
2012	Kathryn Bigelow	Zero Dark Thirty
2012	Ben Affleck	Argo
2012	Paul Thomas Anderson	The Master
2012	Tom Hooper	Les Misérables
2012	Steven Spielberg	Lincoln
2013	Alfonso Cuarón	Gravity
2013	Spike Jonze	Her
2013	Baz Luhrmann	The Great Gatsby
2013	Steve McQueen	12 Years a Slave
2013	Martin Scorsese	The Wolf of Wall Street
2014	Richard Linklater	Boyhood
2014	Damien Chazelle	Whiplash
2014	Ava DuVernay	Selma
2014	David Fincher	Gone Girl
2014	Alejandro G. Iñárritu	Birdman or (The Unexpected Virtue of Ignorance)
2015	George Miller	Mad Max: Fury Road
2015	Alex Garland	Ex Machina
2015	Todd Haynes	Carol
2015	Alejandro G. Iñárritu	The Revenant
2015	Ridley Scott	The Martian
2016	Damien Chazelle	La La Land
2016	Barry Jenkins	Moonlight
2016	Kenneth Lonergan	Manchester by the Sea
2016	David Mackenzie	Hell or High Water
2016	Denis Villeneuve	Arrival
2017	Christopher Nolan	Dunkirk
2017	Guillermo del Toro	The Shape of Water
2017	Greta Gerwig	Lady Bird
2017	Jordan Peele	Get Out
2017	Dee Rees	Mudbound
2018	Alfonso Cuarón	Roma
2018	Ryan Coogler	Black Panther
2018	Bradley Cooper	A Star Is Born
2018	Barry Jenkins	If Beale Street Could Talk
2018	Yorgos Lanthimos	The Favourite
2019	Bong Joon-ho	Parasite
2019	Greta Gerwig	Little Women
2019	Sam Mendes	1917
2019	Martin Scorsese	The Irishman
2019	Quentin Tarantino	Once Upon a Time in Hollywood

=== 2020s ===
Year	Director(s)	Film
2020	Chloé Zhao	Nomadland
2020	Lee Isaac Chung	Minari
2020	Emerald Fennell	Promising Young Woman
2020	Regina King	One Night in Miami…
2020	Kelly Reichardt	First Cow
2021	Jane Campion	The Power of the Dog
2021	Kenneth Branagh	Belfast
2021	David Lowery	The Green Knight
2021	Steven Spielberg	West Side Story
2021	Denis Villeneuve	Dune
2022	Daniels	Everything Everywhere All at Once
2022	Todd Field	TÁR
2022	Martin McDonagh	The Banshees of Inisherin
2022	Sarah Polley	Women Talking
2022	Steven Spielberg	The Fabelmans
2023	Christopher Nolan	Oppenheimer
2023	Greta Gerwig	Barbie
2023	Yorgos Lanthimos	Poor Things
2023	Martin Scorsese	Killers of the Flower Moon
2023	Celine Song	Past Lives
2024	Brady Corbet	The Brutalist
2024	Denis Villeneuve	Dune: Part Two
2024	Edward Berger	Conclave
2024	Jon M. Chu	Wicked
2024	Sean Baker	Anora

== See also ==
- Academy Award for Best Director
