= Washington D.C. Area Film Critics Association Award for Best Actor =

Annual US film award

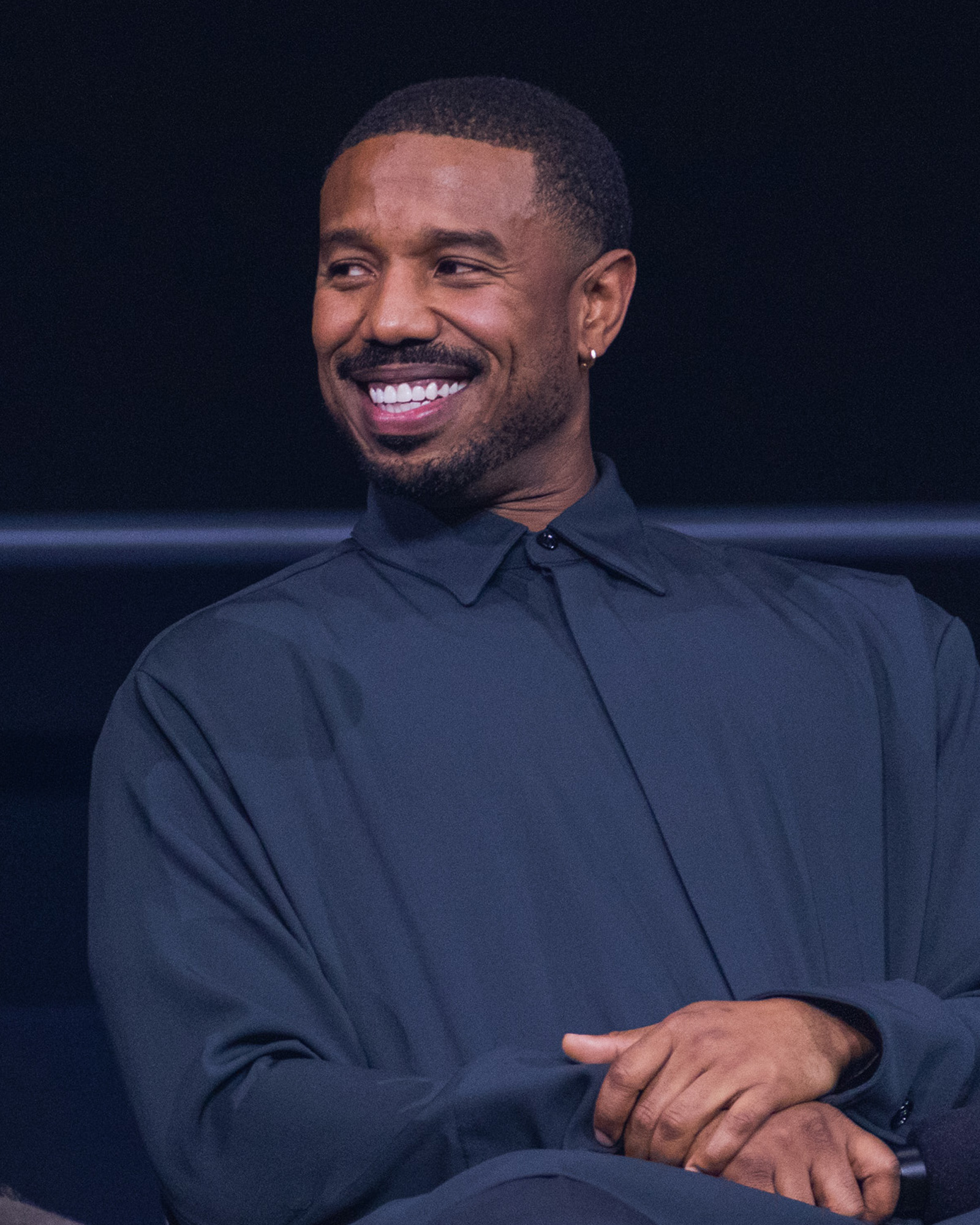
The 2025 recipient: Michael B. Jordan

The Washington D.C. Area Film Critics Association Award for Best Actor is one of the annual awards given by the Washington D.C. Area Film Critics Association.

== Winners and nominees ==
=== 2000s ===
Year	Actor	Film	Role
2002	Jack Nicholson	About Schmidt	Warren Schmidt
2002	Daniel Day-Lewis	Gangs of New York	William "Bill the Butcher" Cutting
2003	Bill Murray	Lost in Translation	Bob Harris
2003	Chiwetel Ejiofor	Dirty Pretty Things	Okwe
2003	Ben Kingsley	House of Sand and Fog	Behrani
2003	Sean Penn	Mystic River	Jimmy Markum
2003	Johnny Depp	Pirates of the Caribbean: The Curse of the Black Pearl	Captain Jack Sparrow
2004	Jamie Foxx	Ray	Ray Charles
2005	Philip Seymour Hoffman	Capote	Truman Capote
2005	Heath Ledger	Brokeback Mountain	Ennis Del Mar
2005	David Strathairn	Good Night, and Good Luck.	Edward R. Murrow
2005	Terrence Howard	Hustle & Flow	DJay
2005	Joaquin Phoenix	Walk the Line	Johnny Cash
2006	Forest Whitaker	The Last King of Scotland	Idi Amin
2007	George Clooney	Michael Clayton	Michael Clayton
2008	Mickey Rourke	The Wrestler	Randy "The Ram" Robinson
2009	George Clooney	Up in the Air	Ryan Bingham
2009	Colin Firth	A Single Man	George Falconer
2009	Morgan Freeman	Invictus	Nelson Mandela
2009	Jeremy Renner	The Hurt Locker	SFC. William James
2009	Viggo Mortensen	The Road	The Man

=== 2010s ===
Year	Actor	Film	Role
2010	Colin Firth	The King's Speech	George VI
2010	Jeff Bridges	True Grit	U.S. Marshal Reuben "Rooster" Cogburn
2010	Robert Duvall	Get Low	Felix Bush
2010	Jesse Eisenberg	The Social Network	Mark Zuckerberg
2010	James Franco	127 Hours	Aron Ralston
2011	George Clooney	The Descendants	Matt King
2011	Jean Dujardin	The Artist	George Valentin
2011	Michael Fassbender	Shame	Brandon Sullivan
2011	Brad Pitt	Moneyball	Billy Beane
2011	Michael Shannon	Take Shelter	Curtis LaForche
2012	Daniel Day-Lewis	Lincoln	Abraham Lincoln
2012	John Hawkes	The Sessions	Mark O'Brien
2012	Hugh Jackman	Les Misérables	Jean Valjean
2012	Joaquin Phoenix	The Master	Freddie Quell
2012	Denzel Washington	Flight	William "Whip" Whitaker, Sr.
2013	Chiwetel Ejiofor	12 Years a Slave	Solomon Northup
2013	Leonardo DiCaprio	The Wolf of Wall Street	Jordan Belfort
2013	Matthew McConaughey	Dallas Buyers Club	Ron Woodroof
2013	Joaquin Phoenix	Her	Theodore Twombly
2013	Robert Redford	All Is Lost	Our Man
2014	Michael Keaton	Birdman or (The Unexpected Virtue of Ignorance)	Riggan Thomson
2014	Benedict Cumberbatch	The Imitation Game	Alan Turing
2014	Oscar Isaac	A Most Violent Year	Abel Morales
2014	David Oyelowo	Selma	Martin Luther King, Jr.
2014	Eddie Redmayne	The Theory of Everything	Stephen Hawking
2015	Leonardo DiCaprio	The Revenant	Hugh Glass
2015	Matt Damon	The Martian	Mark Watney
2015	Johnny Depp	Black Mass	James "Whitey" Bulger
2015	Michael Fassbender	Steve Jobs	Steve Jobs
2015	Eddie Redmayne	The Danish Girl	Lili Elbe / Einar Wegener
2016	Casey Affleck	Manchester by the Sea	Lee Chandler
2016	Joel Edgerton	Loving	Richard Loving
2016	Andrew Garfield	Hacksaw Ridge	Desmond Doss
2016	Ryan Gosling	La La Land	Sebastian Wilder
2016	Denzel Washington	Fences	Troy Maxson
2017	Gary Oldman	Darkest Hour	Winston Churchill
2017	Timothée Chalamet	Call Me by Your Name	Elio Perlman
2017	Daniel Day-Lewis	Phantom Thread	Reynolds Woodcock
2017	James Franco	The Disaster Artist	Tommy Wiseau
2017	Daniel Kaluuya	Get Out	Chris Washington
2018	Bradley Cooper	A Star Is Born	Jackson Maine
2018	Christian Bale	Vice	Dick Cheney
2018	Ethan Hawke	First Reformed	Reverend Ernst Toller
2018	Rami Malek	Bohemian Rhapsody	Freddie Mercury
2018	Viggo Mortensen	Green Book	Tony Vallelonga
2019	Adam Driver	Marriage Story	Charlie Barber
2019	Robert De Niro	The Irishman	Frank "The Irishman" Sheeran
2019	Leonardo DiCaprio	Once Upon a Time in Hollywood	Rick Dalton
2019	Joaquin Phoenix	Joker	Arthur Fleck / Joker
2019	Adam Sandler	Uncut Gems	Howard Ratner

=== 2020s ===
Year	Actor	Film	Role
2020	Chadwick Boseman	Ma Rainey's Black Bottom	Levee Green
2020	Riz Ahmed	Sound of Metal	Ruben Stone
2020	Anthony Hopkins	The Father	Anthony
2020	Delroy Lindo	Da 5 Bloods	Paul
2020	Steven Yeun	Minari	Jacob Yi
2021	Andrew Garfield	Tick, Tick... Boom	Jonathan Larson
2021	Nicolas Cage	Pig	Robin "Rob" Feld
2021	Benedict Cumberbatch	The Power of the Dog	Phil Burbank
2021	Will Smith	King Richard	Richard Williams
2021	Denzel Washington	The Tragedy of Macbeth	Lord Macbeth
2022	Colin Farrell	The Banshees of Inisherin	Pádraic Súilleabháin
2022	Austin Butler	Elvis	Elvis Presley
2022	Tom Cruise	Top Gun: Maverick	Capt. Pete 'Maverick' Mitchell
2022	Brendan Fraser	The Whale	Charlie
2022	Paul Mescal	Aftersun	Calum
2023	Cillian Murphy	Oppenheimer	J. Robert Oppenheimer
2023	Bradley Cooper	Maestro	Leonard Bernstein
2023	Colman Domingo	Rustin	Bayard Rustin
2023	Paul Giamatti	The Holdovers	Paul Hunham
2023	Jeffrey Wright	American Fiction	Thelonious "Monk" Ellison
2024	Colman Domingo	Sing Sing	John "Divine G" Whitfield
2024	Adrien Brody	The Brutalist	László Tóth
2024	Timothée Chalamet	A Complete Unknown	Bob Dylan
2024	Daniel Craig	Queer	William Lee
2024	Ralph Fiennes	Conclave	Thomas Cardinal Lawrence
2025	Michael B. Jordan	Sinners	Elijah "Smoke" Moore / Elias "Stack" Moore
2025	Timothée Chalamet	Marty Supreme	Marty Mauser
2025	Leonardo DiCaprio	One Battle After Another	Bob Ferguson
2025	Joel Edgerton	Train Dreams	Robert Grainier
2025	Ethan Hawke	Blue Moon	Lorenz Hart
