= Washington D.C. Area Film Critics Association Award for Best Film =

Annual US film award

The Washington D.C. Area Film Critics Association Award for Best Film is an annual award given out by the Washington D.C. Area Film Critics Association.

== Winners ==
=== 2000s ===
Year	Film	Director
2002	Road to Perdition	Sam Mendes
2002	Adaptation	Spike Jonze
2002	About Schmidt	Alexander Payne
2002	Antwone Fisher	Denzel Washington
2002	The Lord of the Rings: The Two Towers	Peter Jackson
2003	The Lord of the Rings: The Return of the King	Peter Jackson
2003	City of God	Fernando Meirelles and Kátia Lund
2003	Lost in Translation	Sofia Coppola
2003	Master and Commander: The Far Side of the World	Peter Weir
2003	Mystic River	Clint Eastwood
2004	Eternal Sunshine of the Spotless Mind	Michel Gondry
2005	Munich	Steven Spielberg
2005	Brokeback Mountain	Ang Lee
2005	Capote	Bennett Miller
2005	Crash	Paul Haggis
2005	Good Night, and Good Luck	George Clooney
2006	United 93	Paul Greengrass
2007	No Country for Old Men	Joel Coen and Ethan Coen
2008	Slumdog Millionaire	Danny Boyle
2009	Up in the Air	Jason Reitman
2009	The Hurt Locker	Kathryn Bigelow
2009	Inglorious Basterds	Quentin Tarantino
2009	Precious	Lee Daniels
2009	Up	Pete Docter

=== 2010s ===
Year	Film	Director
2010	The Social Network	David Fincher
2010	127 Hours	Danny Boyle
2010	Black Swan	Darren Aronofsky
2010	Inception	Christopher Nolan
2010	Toy Story 3	Lee Unkrich
2011	The Artist	Michel Hazanavicius
2011	The Descendants	Alexander Payne
2011	Drive	Nicolas Winding Refn
2011	Hugo	Martin Scorsese
2011	Win Win	Tom McCarthy
2012	Zero Dark Thirty	Kathryn Bigelow
2012	Argo	Ben Affleck
2012	Les Misérables	Tom Hooper
2012	Lincoln	Steven Spielberg
2012	Silver Linings Playbook	David O. Russell
2013	12 Years a Slave	Steve McQueen
2013	American Hustle	David O. Russell
2013	Gravity	Alfonso Cuarón
2013	Her	Spike Jonze
2013	Inside Llewyn Davis	The Coen Brothers
2014	Boyhood	Richard Linklater
2014	Birdman or (The Unexpected Virtue of Ignorance)	Alejandro G. Iñárritu
2014	Gone Girl	David Fincher
2014	Selma	Ava DuVernay
2014	Whiplash	Damien Chazelle
2015	Spotlight	Tom McCarthy
2015	Brooklyn	John Crowley
2015	Mad Max: Fury Road	George Miller
2015	The Revenant	Alejandro González Iñárritu
2015	Sicario	Denis Villeneuve
2016	La La Land	Damien Chazelle
2016	Arrival	Denis Villeneuve
2016	Hell or High Water	David Mackenzie
2016	Manchester by the Sea	Kenneth Lonergan
2016	Moonlight	Barry Jenkins
2017	Get Out	Jordan Peele
2017	Call Me by Your Name	Luca Guadagnino
2017	Dunkirk	Christopher Nolan
2017	Lady Bird	Greta Gerwig
2017	Three Billboards Outside Ebbing, Missouri	Martin McDonagh
2018	Roma	Alfonso Cuarón
2018	The Favourite	Yorgos Lanthimos
2018	Green Book	Peter Farrelly
2018	If Beale Street Could Talk	Barry Jenkins
2018	A Star Is Born	Bradley Cooper
2019	Parasite	Bong Joon-ho
2019	1917	Sam Mendes
2019	The Irishman	Martin Scorsese
2019	Marriage Story	Noah Baumbach
2019	Once Upon a Time in Hollywood	Quentin Tarantino

=== 2020s ===
Year	Film	Director
2020	Nomadland	Chloé Zhao
2020	First Cow	Kelly Reichardt
2020	Minari	Lee Isaac Chung
2020	One Night in Miami...	Regina King
2020	Promising Young Woman	Emerald Fennell
2021	Belfast	Kenneth Branagh
2021	The Green Knight	David Lowery
2021	The Power of the Dog	Jane Campion
2021	tick, tick...BOOM!	Lin-Manuel Miranda
2021	West Side Story	Steven Spielberg
2022	Everything Everywhere All at Once	Daniels
2022	The Banshees of Inisherin	Martin McDonagh
2022	The Fabelmans	Steven Spielberg
2022	TÁR	Todd Field
2022	Top Gun: Maverick	Joseph Kosinski
2023	American Fiction	Cord Jefferson
2023	Barbie	Greta Gerwig
2023	Killers of the Flower Moon	Martin Scorsese
2023	Oppenheimer	Christopher Nolan
2023	Past Lives	Celine Song
2023	The Holdovers	Alexander Payne
2024	Wicked	Jon M. Chu
2024	Anora	Sean Baker
2024	Conclave	Edward Berger
2024	Sing Sing	Greg Kwedar
2024	The Brutalist	Brady Corbet
2025	Sinners	Ryan Coogler
2025	Hamnet	Chloé Zhao
2025	Marty Supreme	Josh Safdie
2025	One Battle After Another	Paul Thomas Anderson
2025	Sentimental Value	Joachim Trier

== See also ==
- Academy Award for Best Picture
