= Washington D.C. Area Film Critics Association Award for Best Foreign Language Film =

Annual award given by the Washington D.C. Area Film Critics Association

The Washington D.C. Area Film Critics Association Award for Best Foreign Language Film is an annual award given by the Washington D.C. Area Film Critics Association.

== Winners and nominees ==
=== 2000s ===
Year	Film	Original title	Country	Ref.
2004	Maria Full of Grace	María llena eres de gracia	Colombia / United States / Ecuador	
2005	Kung Fu Hustle	功夫	China / Hong Kong	
2005	Innocent Voices	Voces inocentes	Mexico / El Salvador	
2005	Paradise Now	الجنّة الآن	Netherlands / Palestine / Germany / France	
2005	Schultze Gets the Blues		Germany	
2005	Turtles Can Fly	Kûsî jî dikarin bifirin	Iran / France / Iraq	
2006	Pan's Labyrinth	El laberinto del fauno	Mexico / Spain / United States	
2007	The Diving Bell and the Butterfly	Le scaphandre et le papillon	France / United States	
2008	Let the Right One In	Låt den rätte komma in	Sweden	
2009	Nameless	Sin Nombre	Mexico	
2009	Broken Embraces	Los abrazos rotos	Spain	
2009	Red Cliff		China	
2009	Summer Hours	L'Heure d'été	France	
2009	The White Ribbon	Das weiße Band, Eine deutsche Kindergeschichte	Austria / Germany	

=== 2010s ===
Year	Film	Original title	Country	Ref.
2010	Beautiful	Biutiful	Mexico	
2010	The Girl with the Dragon Tattoo	Män som hatar kvinnor	Sweden	
2010	I Am Love	Io sono l'amore	Italy	
2010	Mother	마더	South Korea	
2010	White Material		France	
2011	The Skin I Live In	La piel que habito	Spain	
2011	13 Assassins	十三人の刺客	Japan	
2011	Certified Copy	Copie conforme	France	
2011	I Saw the Devil	악마를 보았다	South Korea	
2011	Pina		Germany	
2012	Love	Amour	Austria	
2012	Untouchable	Intouchables	France	
2012	I Wish	奇跡	Japan	
2012	A Royal Affair	En kongelig affære	Denmark	
2012	Rust and Bone	De rouille et d'os	Belgium	
2013	The Broken Circle Breakdown	The Broken Circle Breakdown	Belgium	
2013	Blue Is the Warmest Colour	La Vie d'Adèle – Chapitres 1 & 2	France	
2013	The Hunt	Jagten	Denmark	
2013	The Past	Le Passé	France	
2013	Wadjda	وجدة	Saudi Arabia	
2014	Force Majeure	Turist	Sweden	
2014	Ida		Poland	
2014	Mommy		Canada	
2014	Two Days, One Night	Deux jours, une nuit	Belgium	
2014	Wild Tales	Relatos salvajes	Argentina	
2015	Son of Saul	Saul fia	Hungary	
2015	The Assassin	刺客聶隱娘	Taiwan	
2015	Goodnight Mommy	Ich seh, Ich seh	Austria	
2015	Mustang		France / Turkey	
2015	The Second Mother	Que Horas Ela Volta?	Brazil	
2016	Elle		France	
2016	The Handmaiden	아가씨	South Korea	
2016	Julieta		Spain	
2016	The Salesman	فروشنده	Iran	
2016	Toni Erdmann		Germany	
2017	BPM (Beats per Minute)	120 battements par minute	France	
2017	First They Killed My Father	មុនដំបូងខ្មែរក្រហមសម្លាប់ប៉ារបស់ខ្	Cambodia	
2017	In the Fade	Aus dem Nichts	Germany	
2017	The Square		Sweden	
2017	Thelma		Norway	
2018	Roma		Mexico	
2018	Burning	버닝 (Beoning)	South Korea	
2018	Capernaum	کفرناحوم (Capharnaüm)	Lebanon	
2018	Cold War	Zimna wojna	Poland	
2018	Shoplifters	万引き家族 (Manbiki Kazoku)	Japan	
2019	Parasite	기생충 (Gisaengchung)	South Korea	
2019	Atlantics	Atlantique	Senegal	
2019	Monos		Colombia	
2019	Pain and Glory	Dolor y gloria	Spain	
2019	Portrait of a Lady on Fire	Portrait de la jeune fille en feu	France	

=== 2020s ===
Year	Film	Original title	Country	Ref.
2020	Another Round	Druk	Denmark	
2020	Bacurau		Brazil	
2020	La Llorona		Guatemala	
2020	The Mole Agent	El agente topo	Chile	
2020	Night of the Kings	La Nuit des rois	France / Côte d'Ivoire / Canada / Senegal	
2021	Drive My Car	ドライブ・マイ・カー	Japan	
2021	A Hero	قهرمان	Iran	
2021	Lamb	Dýrið	Iceland / Sweden / Poland	
2021	Titane		France / Belgium	
2021	The Worst Person in the World	Verdens verste menneske	Norway / France / Denmark / Sweden	
2022	Decision to Leave	헤어질 결심	South Korea	
2022	All Quiet on the Western Front	Im Westen nichts Neues	Germany	
2022	Close		Belgium / France / Netherlands	
2022	EO	IO	Poland	
2022	RRR		India	
2023	Anatomy of a Fall	Anatomie d'une chute	France	
2023	Fallen Leaves	Kuolleet lehdet	Finland / Germany	
2023	Perfect Days		Belgium / Japan / Germany	
2023	Society of the Snow	La sociedad de la nieve	Spain / United States	
2023	The Taste of Things	La Passion de Dodin Bouffant	France	
2023	The Teachers' Lounge	Das Lehrerzimmer	Germany	
2023	The Zone of Interest		United Kingdom / Poland / United States	
2024	Emilia Pérez		France	
2024	Dahomey		France / Senegal / Benin	
2024	Flow	Straume	Latvia / Belgium / France	
2024	I'm Still Here	Ainda Estou Aqui	Brazil	
2024	The Seed of the Sacred Fig	دانه‌ی انجیر معابد	Iran / Germany / France	
