= London Film Critics Circle Awards 2005 =

British film awards ceremony

26th London Film Critics Circle Awards

8 February 2006

Film of the Year:
Brokeback Mountain

British Film of the Year:
The Constant Gardener

The 26th London Film Critics Circle Awards, honouring the best in film for 2005, were announced by the London Film Critics Circle on 8 February 2006.

== Winners and nominees ==
=== Film of the Year ===
Brokeback Mountain

- The Constant Gardener
- Crash
- A History of Violence
- King Kong

=== British Film of the Year ===
The Constant Gardener

- The Descent
- Mrs Henderson Presents
- Pride & Prejudice
- Wallace & Gromit: The Curse of the Were-Rabbit

=== Foreign Language Film of the Year ===
Downfall • Germany

- The Beat that My Heart Skipped • France
- Caché • Austria/France
- The Chorus • France
- The Sea Inside • Spain

=== Director of the Year ===
Ang Lee – Brokeback Mountain

- David Cronenberg – A History of Violence
- Paul Haggis – Crash
- Peter Jackson – King Kong
- Fernando Meirelles – The Constant Gardener

=== British Director of the Year ===
Joe Wright – Pride & Prejudice

- Stephen Frears – Mrs Henderson Presents
- Terry George – Hotel Rwanda
- Neil Marshall – The Descent
- Christopher Nolan – Batman Begins

=== Screenwriter of the Year ===
Paul Haggis and Robert Moresco – Crash

- Larry McMurtry and Diana Ossana – Brokeback Mountain
- Jeffrey Caine – The Constant Gardener
- Bernd Eichinger – Downfall
- Shane Black – Kiss Kiss Bang Bang

=== Actor of the Year ===
Bruno Ganz – Downfall

- Don Cheadle- Hotel Rwanda
- Johnny Depp – Charlie and the Chocolate Factory
- Heath Ledger – Brokeback Mountain
- Viggo Mortensen – A History of Violence

=== Actress of the Year ===
Naomi Watts – King Kong

- Maria Bello – A History of Violence
- Juliette Binoche – Caché
- Laura Linney – Kinsey
- Catalina Sandino Moreno – Maria Full of Grace

=== British Actor of the Year ===
Ralph Fiennes – The Constant Gardener

- Christian Bale – The Machinist
- Chiwetel Ejiofor – Kinky Boots
- Liam Neeson – Kinsey
- Tom Wilkinson – Separate Lies

=== British Actress of the Year ===
Rachel Weisz – The Constant Gardener

- Judi Dench – Mrs Henderson Presents
- Keira Knightley – Pride & Prejudice
- Kristin Scott Thomas – Keeping Mum
- Emily Watson – Separate Lies

=== British Supporting Actor of the Year ===
Tom Hollander – Pride & Prejudice

- Paddy Considine – Cinderella Man
- Brendan Gleeson – Harry Potter and the Goblet of Fire
- James McAvoy – The Chronicles of Narnia: The Lion, the Witch and the Wardrobe
- Cillian Murphy – Batman Begins

=== British Supporting Actress of the Year ===
Thandie Newton – Crash

- Brenda Blethyn- Pride & Prejudice
- Sophie Okonedo – Hotel Rwanda
- Rosamund Pike – Pride & Prejudice
- Tilda Swinton – The Chronicles of Narnia: The Lion, the Witch and the Wardrobe

=== British Newcomer of the Year ===
Kelly Reilly – Mrs Henderson Presents

- Julian Fellowes – Separate Lies
- Annie Griffin – Festival
- Matthew Macfadyen – Pride & Prejudice
- Joe Wright – Pride & Prejudice

=== British Producer of the Year ===
Simon Channing-Williams – The Constant Gardener

- Marc Boothe, Ruth Caleb – Bullet Boy
- Andrew Eaton, Michael Winterbottom – A Cock and Bull Story
- Christian Colson – Separate Lies
- Peter Lord – Wallace & Gromit: The Curse of the Were-Rabbit

=== Dilys Powell Award ===
- Bryan Forbes
