= Online Film Critics Society Award for Best Breakthrough Performance =

Former annual film award

The Online Film Critics Society Award for Best Breakthrough Performance was an annual film award given by the Online Film Critics Society to honor the best breakthrough performance of the year. It was not included after the 2011 awards, though its retirement was never formally announced.

== Winners ==
- 2000: Björk

(for her role as Selma Ježková in Dancer in the Dark)

- 2001: Naomi Watts

(for her role as Betty Elms / Diane Selwyn in Mulholland Drive)

- 2002: Maggie Gyllenhaal

(for her role as Lee Holloway in Secretary)

- 2003: Keisha Castle-Hughes

(for her role as Paikea Apirana in Whale Rider)

- 2004: Catalina Sandino Moreno

(for her role as Maria Álvarez in Maria Full of Grace)

- 2005: Owen Kline

(for his role as Frank Berkman in The Squid and the Whale)

- 2006: Sacha Baron Cohen

(for his role as Borat Sagdiyev in Borat: Cultural Learnings of America for Make Benefit Glorious Nation of Kazakhstan)

- 2007: Nikki Blonsky

(for her role as Tracy Edna Turnblad in Hairspray)

- 2008: Lina Leandersson

(for her role as Eli in Let the Right One In)

- 2011: Jessica Chastain

(for her roles as Mrs. O’Brien in The Tree of Life, Celia Rae Foote in The Help, and Rachel Singer in The Debt)
