= Washington D.C. Area Film Critics Association =

American organization

- Abbreviation: WAFCA
- Formation: 2002
- Type: Film criticism
- Location: Washington, D.C., U.S.
- Official language: English
- Website: www.wafca.com

The Washington D.C. Area Film Critics Association (WAFCA) is a group of film critics based in Washington, D.C., and founded in 2002. WAFCA is composed of over 65 D.C.-based film critics from internet, print, radio, and television. Annually, the group gives awards to the best in film as selected by its members by vote.

== Categories ==
- Best Actor
- Best Actress
- Best Adapted Screenplay
- Best Animated Feature
- Best Art Direction
- Best Breakthrough Performance
- Best Cinematography
- Best Director
- Best Documentary
- Best Editing
- Best Ensemble
- Best Film
- Best Foreign Language Film
- Best Motion Capture Performance
- Best Original Screenplay
- Best Production Design
- Best Score
- Best Supporting Actor
- Best Supporting Actress
- Best Voice Performance
- Best Youth Performance

== Ceremonies ==
- 2002
- 2003
- 2004
- 2005
- 2006
- 2007
- 2008
- 2009
- 2010
- 2011
- 2012
- 2013
- 2014
- 2015
- 2016
- 2017
- 2018
- 2019
- 2020
- 2021
- 2022
- 2023
- 2024
- 2025

== Awards breakdown ==
=== Films with two or more ===
7

- La La Land (2016) – Best Film, Best Director, Best Original Screenplay, Best Cinematography, Best Editing, Best Production Design, Best Score

6

- 12 Years a Slave (2013) – Best Film, Best Actor, Best Supporting Actress, Best Adapted Screenplay, Best Ensemble, Best Score
- Nomadland (2020) – Best Film, Best Director, Best Actress, Best Adapted Screenplay, Best Cinematography, Best Editing
- Oppenheimer (2023) – Best Director, Best Actor, Best Cinematography, Best Editing, Best Score, Best Ensemble

5

- Birdman or (The Unexpected Virtue of Ignorance) (2014) – Best Actor, Best Original Screenplay, Best Ensemble, Best Cinematography, Best Editing

4

- Boyhood (2014) – Best Film, Best Director, Best Supporting Actress, Best Youth Performance
- Eternal Sunshine of the Spotless Mind (2004) – Best Film, Best Director, Best Original Screenplay, Best Ensemble
- Inception (2010) – Best Original Screenplay, Best Art Direction, Best Cinematography, Best Score
- No Country for Old Men (2007) – Best Film, Best Director, Best Supporting Actor, Best Ensemble
- Roma (2018) – Best Film, Best Director, Best Cinematography, Best Foreign Language Film
- Slumdog Millionaire (2008) – Best Film, Best Director, Best Adapted Screenplay, Best Breakthrough Performance

3

- Parasite (2019) - Best Film, Best Director, Best Foreign Language Film
- The Social Network (2010) – Best Film, Best Director, Best Adapted Screenplay
- Up in the Air (2009) – Best Film, Best Actor, Best Adapted Screenplay
- Zero Dark Thirty (2012) – Best Film, Best Director, Best Actress

2

- 21 Grams (2003) – Best Actress, Best Supporting Actor
- The Artist (2011) – Best Film, Best Score
- Capote (2005) – Best Actor, Best Adapted Screenplay
- Crash (2005) – Best Original Screenplay, Best Ensemble
- Doubt (2008) – Best Actress, Best Ensemble
- Dreamgirls (2006) – Best Supporting Actress, Best Breakthrough Performance
- The Fighter (2010) – Best Supporting Actor, Best Supporting Actress
- The Hurt Locker (2009) – Best Director, Best Ensemble
- Hugo (2011) – Best Director, Best Art Direction
- Inglourious Basterds (2009) – Best Supporting Actor, Best Original Screenplay
- Les Misérables (2012) – Best Supporting Actress, Best Ensemble
- Little Miss Sunshine (2006) – Best Original Screenplay, Best Ensemble
- The Lord of the Rings: The Return of the King (2003) – Best Film, Best Director
- Lost in Translation (2003) – Best Actor, Best Original Screenplay
- Minari (2020) – Best Supporting Actress, Best Youth Performance
- Munich (2005) – Best Film, Best Director
- Precious (2009) – Best Supporting Actress, Best Breakthrough Performance
- The Revenant (2015) – Best Actor, Best Cinematography
- Road to Perdition (2002) – Best Film, Best Director

=== People with two or more ===
3

- George Clooney – Best Actor: Michael Clayton (2007), Up in the Air (2009), and The Descendants (2011)
- Frances McDormand – Best Actress:Three Billboards Outside Ebbing, Missouri (2018), Nomadland (2021) and Best Ensemble: Three Billboards Outside Ebbing, Missouri (2018)

2

- Amy Adams – Best Supporting Actress: Junebug (2005); Best Ensemble: Doubt (2008)
- Javier Bardem – Best Supporting Actor & Best Ensemble: No Country for Old Men (2007)
- Jamie Foxx – Best Actor: Ray (2004); Best Supporting Actor: Collateral (2004)
- Anne Hathaway – Best Supporting Actress & Best Ensemble: Les Misérables (2012)
- Terrence Howard – Best Breakthrough Performance: Hustle & Flow (2005); Best Ensemble: Crash (2005)
- Jennifer Hudson – Best Breakthrough Performance & Best Supporting Actress: Dreamgirls (2006)
- Carey Mulligan – Best Actress: An Education (2009); Best Ensemble: Pride & Prejudice (2005)
- Jason Reitman – Best Adapted Screenplay: Thank You for Smoking (2006) & Up in the Air (2009)
- Aaron Sorkin – Best Adapted Screenplay: Charlie Wilson's War (2007) & The Social Network (2010)
- Meryl Streep – Best Actress & Best Ensemble: Doubt (2008)
