= Chicago Film Critics Association Awards 2004 =

Annual US film awards ceremony

17th CFCA Awards

2005

Best Film:
Sideways

The 17th Chicago Film Critics Association Awards, presented in 2005, honored the best in film for 2004.

== Winners ==
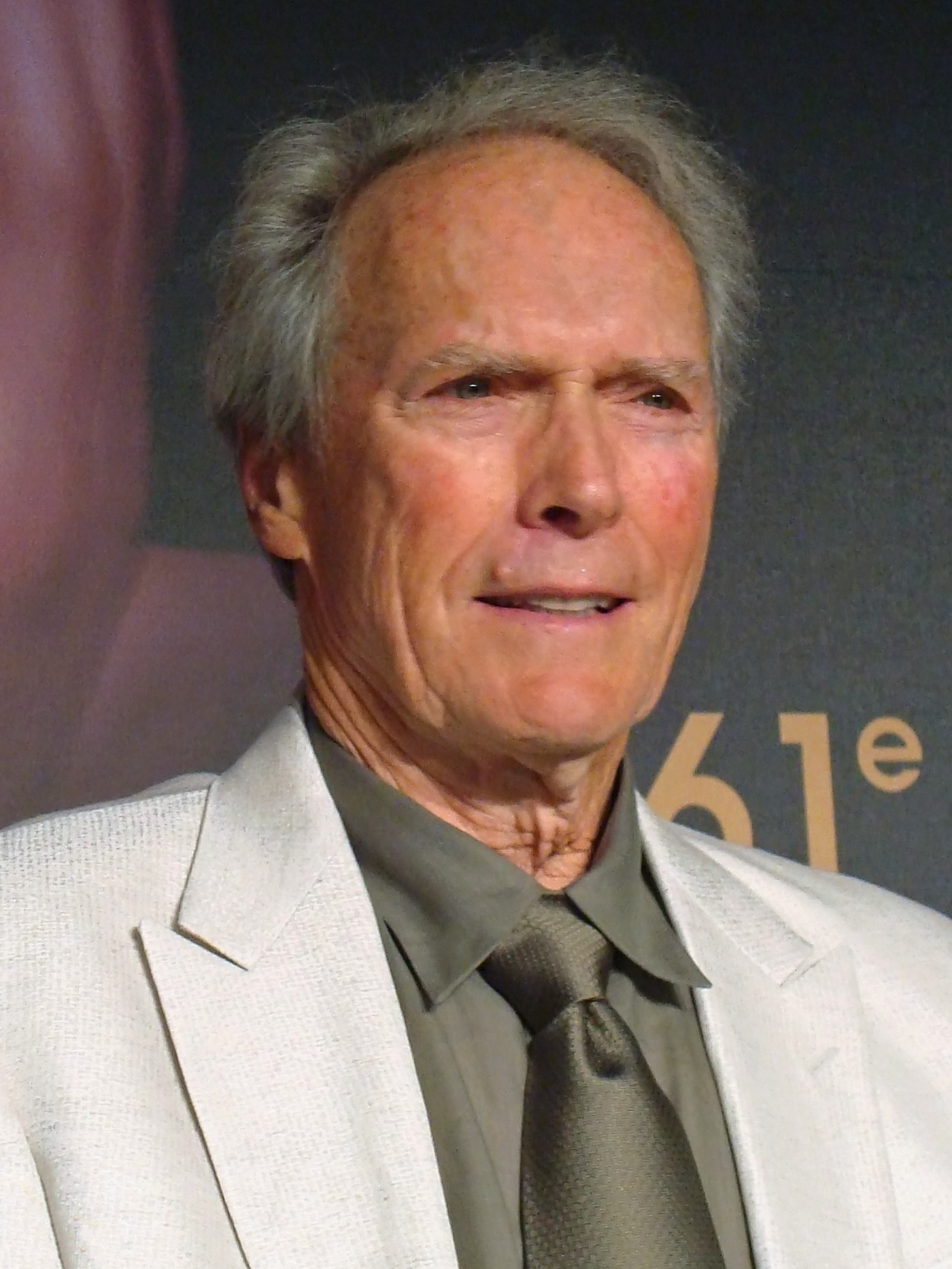
Clint Eastwood, Best Director winner

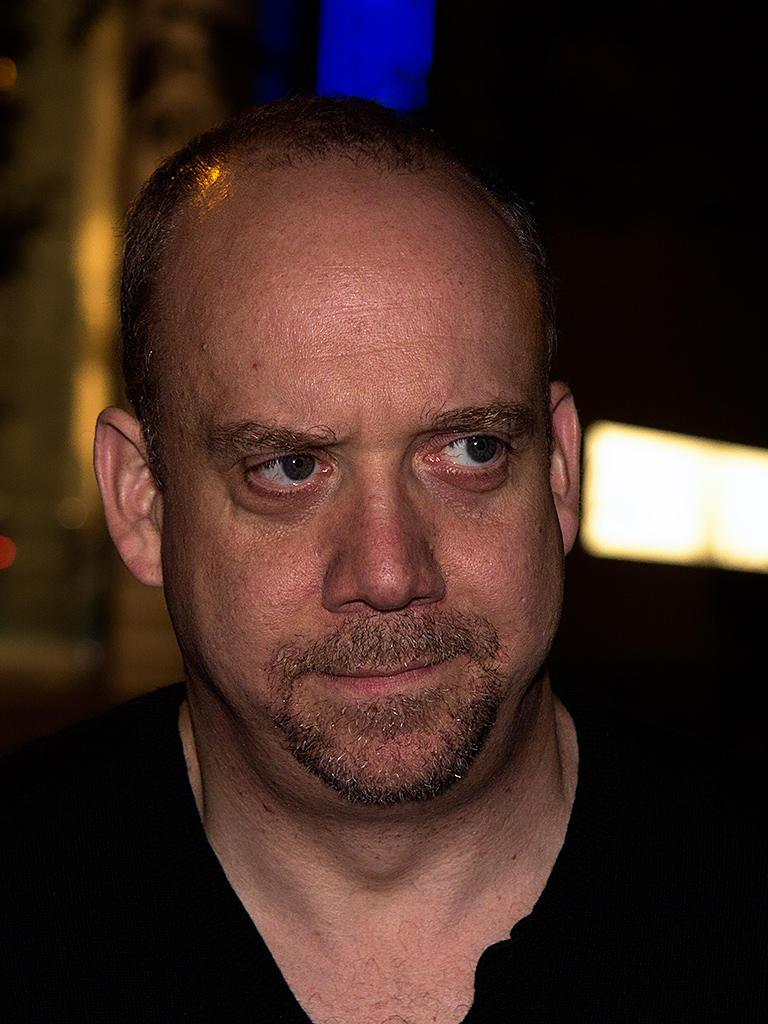
Paul Giamatti, Best Actor winner

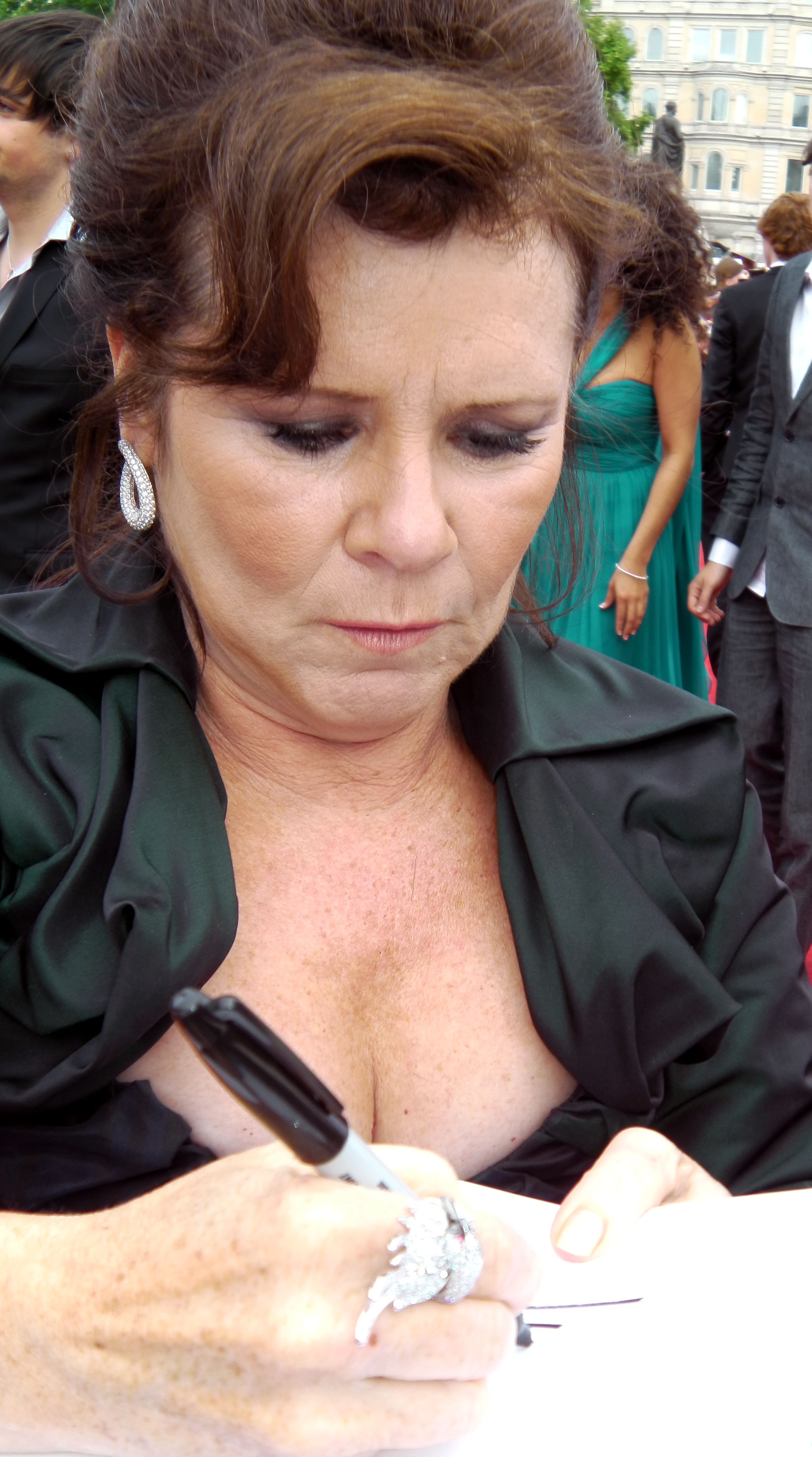
Imelda Staunton, Best Actress winner

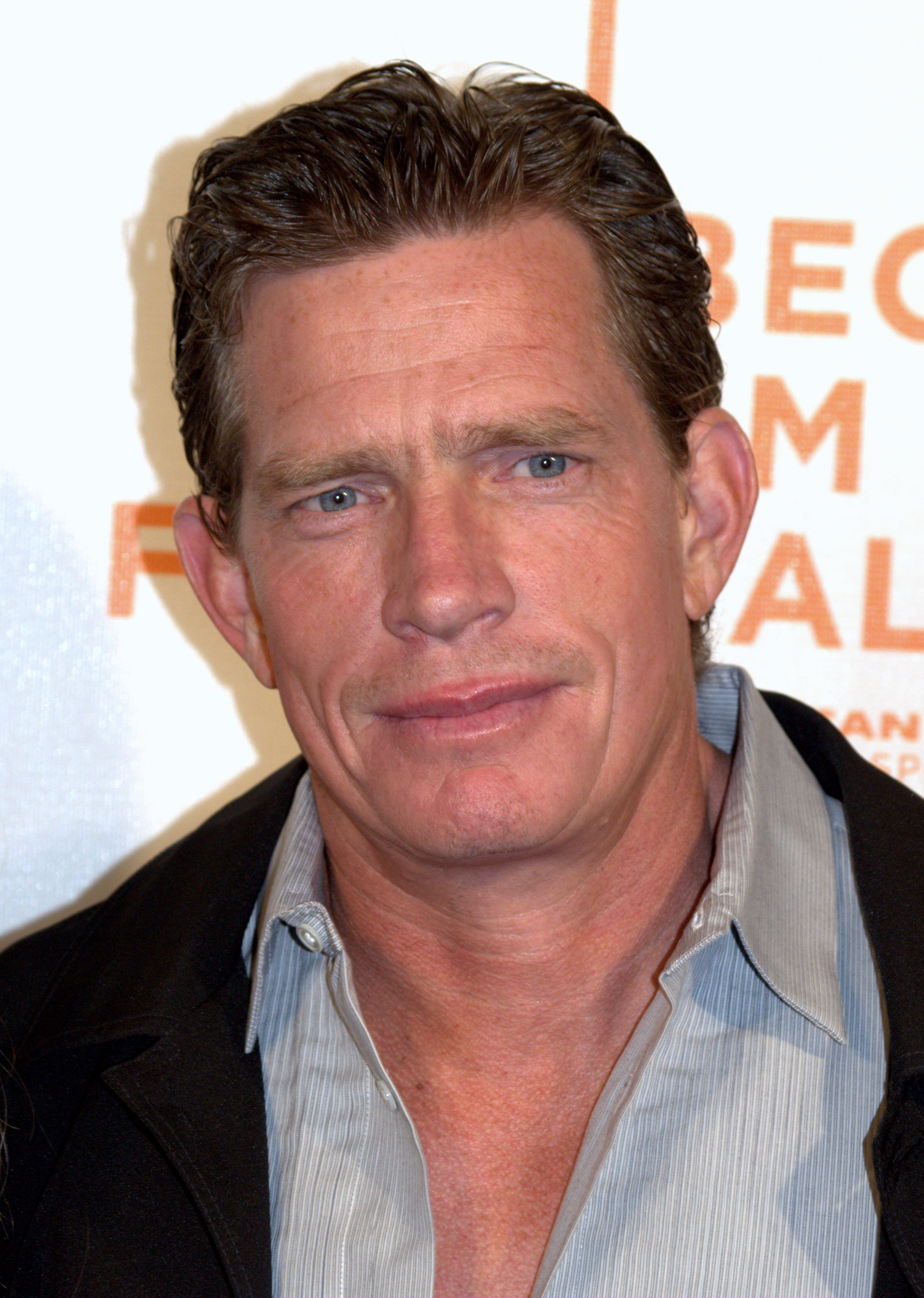
Thomas Haden Church, Best Supporting Actor winner

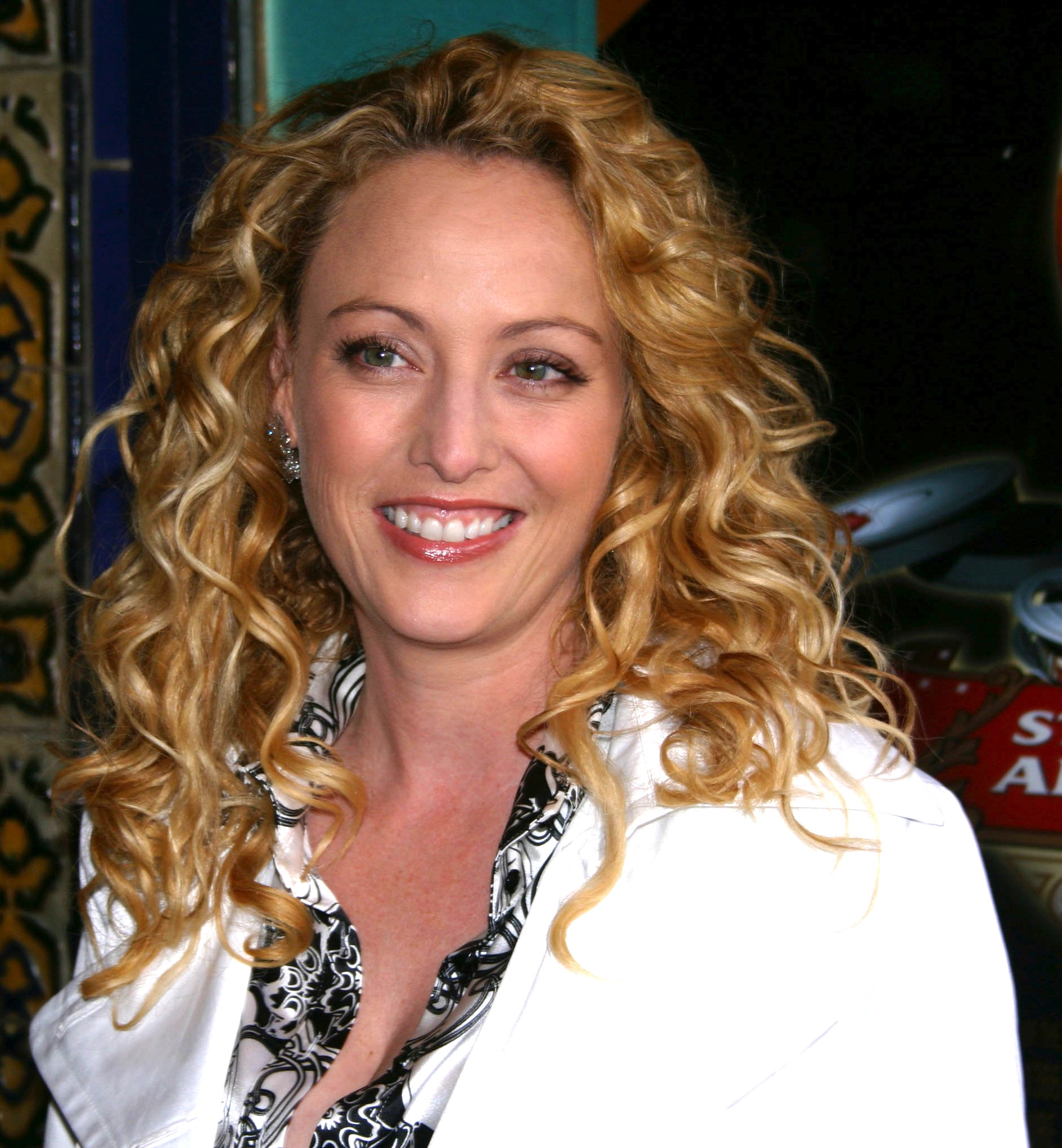
Virginia Madsen, Best Supporting Actress winner

=== Best Actor ===
Paul Giamatti - Sideways

=== Best Actress ===
Imelda Staunton - Vera Drake

- Hilary Swank – Million Dollar Baby
- Kate Winslet – Eternal Sunshine of the Spotless Mind
- Catalina Sandino Moreno – Maria Full of Grace
- Annette Bening – Being Julia

=== Best Cinematography (TIE) ===
Robert Richardson - The Aviator

Christopher Doyle - Ying xiong (Hero)

=== Best Director ===
Clint Eastwood - Million Dollar Baby

=== Best Documentary Feature ===
Fahrenheit 9/11

=== Best Film ===
Sideways

=== Best Foreign Language Film ===
Un long dimanche de fiançailles (A Very Long Engagement), France/United States

=== Best Original Score ===
Howard Shore - The Aviator

=== Best Screenplay ===
Sideways - Alexander Payne and Jim Taylor

=== Best Supporting Actor ===
Thomas Haden Church - Sideways

=== Best Supporting Actress ===
Virginia Madsen - Sideways

=== Most Promising Filmmaker ===
Zach Braff - Garden State

=== Most Promising Performer ===
Catalina Sandino Moreno - Maria Full of Grace
