= Maria Full of Grace =

2004 film by Joshua Marston

- Theatrical release poster
- Directed by: Joshua Marston
- Written by: Joshua Marston
- Produced by: Paul S. Mezey
- Starring: Catalina Sandino Moreno; Yenny Paola Vega; John Álex Toro; Guilied Lopez; Patricia Rae
- Cinematography: Jim Denault
- Edited by: Anne McCabe; Lee Percy
- Music by: Leonardo Heiblum; Jacobo Lieberman
- Production companies: HBO Films; Journeyman Pictures
- Distributed by: Tayrona Entertainment Group (Colombia); Fine Line Features (United States)
- Release dates: 18 January 2004 (Sundance); 2 April 2004 (Colombia); 8 June 2004 (USA)
- Running time: 101 minutes
- Countries: Colombia; United States
- Languages: Spanish & English
- Budget: $3.2 million
- Box office: $12.6 million

Maria Full of Grace (Spanish title: María, llena eres de gracia, lit., "Maria, you are full of grace") is a 2004 Spanish-language drama film written and directed by Joshua Marston. The film was a US-Colombia co-production. The story follows a Colombian girl who becomes a drug mule for a trafficking ring. Lead actress Catalina Sandino Moreno won Best Actress at the Berlin Film Festival, and was nominated for the Academy Award for Best Actress in the 77th Academy Awards.

== Plot ==
Seventeen-year-old Colombian girl Maria Álvarez works in sweatshop-like conditions at a flower plantation. Her income helps support her family, including an unemployed sister who is a single mother, but after unjust treatment from her boss, she quits her job de-thorning roses, despite her family's vehement disapproval. Shortly thereafter, Maria discovers she is pregnant by her boyfriend, and he suggests marriage, but she declines because she does not feel he loves her. On her way to Bogotá to find a new job, she is offered a position as a drug mule. Desperate, she accepts the risky offer, and swallows 62 wrapped pellets of drugs, and flies to New York City with her friend Blanca, who has also been recruited as a drug mule.

Maria is almost caught by U.S. customs who are suspicious after finding Maria's $800 in cash and wanting to make a surprise visit to a sister she "hasn't seen in years", but not knowing anywhere else to go if she isn't home. She tells them that the father of her child paid for her plane ticket. She avoids being X-rayed due to her pregnancy, and is released. The traffickers collect Maria, Blanca, and Lucy, another more experienced mule that Maria had befriended during her recruitment. The mules are held in a motel room until they pass all the drug pellets. Lucy falls ill when a drug pellet apparently ruptures inside her. Unknown to the traffickers, Maria witnesses them carrying Lucy out of the hotel room, and she sees blood stains in the bathtub. She comes to the conclusion that the traffickers cut her open to retrieve the other drug pellets inside her body. Scared, Maria convinces Blanca to escape with her while the traffickers are gone. They leave with the drugs they have passed.

Maria has nowhere to sleep, and goes to Lucy's sister's house, but doesn't reveal to the sister that Lucy is dead. Blanca soon joins her there. Eventually the sister unexpectedly hears of their involvement in her sister's death and throws them out. Blanca and Maria make an agreement to return the drugs to the traffickers and receive their money. Maria uses some of her drug money to send Lucy's body home to Colombia for a proper burial. Maria and Blanca are ready to board the plane back to Colombia when Maria decides to stay in the United States. Blanca returns home without Maria.

== Cast ==
- Catalina Sandino Moreno as Maria Álvarez
- John Álex Toro as Franklin
- Johanna Andrea Mora as Diana Álvarez
- Virginia Ariza as Juana
- Yenny Paola Vega as Blanca
- Guilied Lopez as Lucy Díaz
- Orlando Tobón as Don Fernando
- Patricia Rae as Carla
- Rodrigo Sánchez Borhorquez as The Supervisor
- Charles Albert Patiño as Felipe
- Wilson Guerrero as Juan
- Fabricio Suarez, Mateo Suarez as Pacho
- Evangelina Morales as Rosita
- Juana Guarderas as The Pharmacist
- Jaime Osorio Gómez as Javier
- Victor Macias as Pellet Maker
- Selenis Leyva as Customs Inspector

== Production ==
=== Writing ===
Writer and director Joshua Marston was inspired to write the film after a conversation he had with a real-life drug mule who transported illegal drugs inside her body. He first attempted to write a script about the drug war, but decided to abandon a more polemical, broader approach in favor of a more personal one. For research, he interviewed prisoners, flower plantation workers in Colombia, U.S. Customs inspectors, and Colombian immigrants living in Queens, New York. When Marston showed his finished script to potential producers, they resisted his decision to shoot the film in Spanish and suggested big-name actresses like Penélope Cruz or Jennifer Lopez for Maria. Marston gave the script to producer Paul Mezey, who loved it and took it to HBO. Marston said, "HBO told Paul to just make it. In Spanish. With a first-time filmmaker. With an unknown cast. I think I owe my first-born child to HBO."

I didn’t want to do the sort of story we’ve seen before about drug trafficking. I didn’t want to tell the story from the point of view of the cop, or the DEA agent, or the drug lord. I wanted to turn that story on its head and tell it from the point of view of the little person, the person who’s normally demonized and criminalized. That’s part of the ideology of the drug war, to render things in black and white, and to say the person who [smuggles drugs] is a bad person who needs to be put in jail, and that the solution to all this is to beef up the border and hire more customs agents and build more prison cells.

— Joshua Marston on the inspiration for the film

=== Casting ===
Marston considered about 800 actresses to play Maria; with weeks to go before filming, Colombian actress Catalina Sandino Moreno sent in an audition tape and won the role, her first screen credit. As preparation, Sandino Moreno worked on a flower plantation for two weeks.

The character of Don Fernando is played by Orlando Tobón, who is known as the "Mayor of Little Colombia" in Queens. The character is based on Tobón’s real-life work as a counselor and middleman for Colombian immigrants in need. Tobón is also credited as an associated producer on the film.

=== Filming ===
Filming was planned to take place in Colombia, but was prevented due to several bombings prior to the country’s 2002 presidential election. Venezuela was considered as an alternate option until an attempted coup d’état erupted, so filming eventually took place in the Ecuadorian village of Amaguaña. The film shot for 20 days in Ecuador, with a second unit in Colombia, and 20 days in New York.

To ease the process of making a bilingual film, Marston encouraged the actors to improvise: "[During rehearsals] I gave all the actors half the script for 24 hours and then took it back from them. I didn’t want them to know how it ended. I took it back so that three weeks later, when we started improvising, we could improvise loosely based on what was written, so they wouldn’t be stuck on the words. We would arrive at a location and start improvising and do three or four improvs based on a rough memory of what happened in the scene. Then we would open the script and reread what I had written, turn to a blank page, pass a pen around in a circle and rewrite the scene together. So partly the structure of the scene would change, but more frequently the actual word choice would change. This was so [the actors] would have a certain sense of ownership over the way their characters spoke."

In the film, Sandino Moreno swallowed real pellets, though they were not latex and contained an easily digestible sugar-like substance.

== Release ==
Maria Full of Grace was first shown on 18 January 2004 at the Sundance Film Festival in the United States. On 11 February 2004, it was shown at the Berlin Film Festival. It premiered in Colombia on 2 April 2004. The film was originally going to premiere on HBO, but the film’s success at Sundance, as well as the success of Latina film Real Women Have Curves, prompted Fine Line Features to release the film theatrically. The film had a limited release on 16 July 2004, before going wide in the United States on 6 August 2004.

== Reception ==
=== Critical response ===
The film was critically acclaimed. It garnered a 97% approval rating on the aggregator site Rotten Tomatoes, based on 146 reviews, and an average rating of 8/10. The website's critical consensus states, "In a striking debut, Moreno carries the movie and puts a human face on the drug trade". On Metacritic, the film has a weighted average score of 87 out of 100, based on 39 critics, indicating "universal acclaim".

According to Desson Thomson from The Washington Post, "Catalina Sandino Moreno is a Colombian Mona Lisa, a delicate, unforgettable force majeure. Add to her luminous demeanor a story that rips fleshy holes through your heart and you've got yourself a stunner of a film". Roger Ebert awarded the film 3 and a half stars out of 4 and said, "Like [Ken] Loach, Marston has made a film that understands and accepts poverty without feeling the need to romanticize or exaggerate it. Also like Loach, he shows us how evil things happen because of economic systems, not because villains gnash their teeth and hog the screen. Hollywood simplifies the world for moviegoers by pretending evil is generated by individuals, not institutions; kill the bad guy, and the problem is solved."

Writing for Rolling Stone, Peter Travers gave the film 3 out of 4 stars, praising Moreno's performance, the screenplay, and Marston's direction, saying: "Remember the name Catalina Sandino Moreno. The heartfelt and harrowing performance she gives here should put her in line for a heap of year-end awards."

The film was nominated to the Golden Bear at the 54th Berlin Film Festival.

The film had originally been selected by Colombia to be its official choice for Best International Feature at the 77th Academy Awards. However, it was rejected because it was considered to be not Colombian enough; the film El Rey was submitted instead.

=== Box office ===
Its total worldwide gross stands at $12,594,630 ($6,529,624 at the American box office, and $6,065,006 from other territories).

== Accolades ==
List of Accolades
Award / Film Festival	Category	Recipient(s)	Result
77th Academy Awards	Best Actress	Catalina Sandino Moreno	Nominated
Argentine Film Critics Association	Best Ibero-American Film	Joshua Marston	Won
54th Berlin Film Festival	Golden Bear	Joshua Marston	Nominated
54th Berlin Film Festival	Silver Bear	Catalina Sandino Moreno	Won
54th Berlin Film Festival	Alfred Bauer Award	Joshua Marston	Won
25th Boston Society of Film Critics Awards	Best New Filmmaker	Joshua Marston	2nd Place
10th Broadcast Film Critics Association Awards	Best Actress	Catalina Sandino Moreno	Nominated
10th Broadcast Film Critics Association Awards	Best Foreign Language Film	Joshua Marston	Nominated
Cartagena Film Festival	Golden India Catalina for Best Actress	Catalina Sandino Moreno	Won
Cartagena Film Festival	Special Jury Prize	Joshua Marston	Won
17th Chicago Film Critics Association	Most Promising Performer	Catalina Sandino Moreno	Won
10th Dallas-Fort Worth Film Critics Association	Best Actress	Catalina Sandino Moreno	Nominated
10th Dallas-Fort Worth Film Critics Association	Best Foreign Language Film	Joshua Marston	Nominated
10th Dallas-Fort Worth Film Critics Association	Russell Smith Award	Joshua Marston	Won
Deauville Film Festival	Grand Prix	Joshua Marston	Won
Deauville Film Festival	Prix du Public	Joshua Marston	Won
Deauville Film Festival	Prix de la Critique Internationale	Joshua Marston	Won
14th Gotham Independent Film Awards	Breakthrough Actor	Catalina Sandino Moreno	Won
14th Gotham Independent Film Awards	Breakthrough Director	Joshua Marston	Won
20th Independent Spirit Awards	Best Film	Paul Mezey	Nominated
20th Independent Spirit Awards	Best Director	Joshua Marston	Nominated
20th Independent Spirit Awards	Best Female Lead	Catalina Sandino Moreno	Won
20th Independent Spirit Awards	Best Supporting Female	Yenny Paola Vega	Nominated
20th Independent Spirit Awards	Best First Screenplay	Joshua Marston	Won
26th London Film Critics Circle Awards	Actress of the Year	Catalina Sandino Moreno	Nominated
30th Los Angeles Film Critics Association	New Generation Award	Catalina Sandino Moreno and Joshua Marston	Won
76th National Board of Review	Top Foreign Films	Joshua Marston	Won
70th New York Film Critics Circle	Best First Film	Joshua Marston	Won
8th Online Film Critics Society	Best Foreign Language Film	Joshua Marston	Nominated
8th Online Film Critics Society	Best Breakthrough Filmmaker	Joshua Marston	Nominated
8th Online Film Critics Society	Best Breakthrough Performance	Catalina Sandino Moreno	Won
3rd San Francisco Film Critics Circle Awards	Best Foreign Language Film	Joshua Marston	Won
9th Satellite Awards	Best Film – Drama	Joshua Marston	Nominated
9th Satellite Awards	Best Director – Motion Picture	Joshua Marston	Nominated
9th Satellite Awards	Best Actress - Drama	Catalina Sandino Moreno	Nominated
11th Screen Actors Guild Awards	Outstanding Performance by a Female Actor in a Leading Role	Catalina Sandino Moreno	Nominated
Seattle International Film Festival	Best Actress	Catalina Sandino Moreno	Won
Sundance Film Festival	Audience Award Dramatic	Joshua Marston	Won
8th Toronto Film Critics Association Awards	Best First Feature	Joshua Marston	Won
5th Vancouver Film Critics Circle	Best Foreign Language Film	Joshua Marston	Nominated
3rd Washington D.C. Area Film Critics Association	Best Foreign Language Film	Joshua Marston	Won

== See also ==
- Movies depicting Colombia
- List of Colombian films
- Balloon swallowing
