= Online Film Critics Society Awards 2004 =

8th Online Film Critics Society Awards

8th Online Film Critics Society Awards

January 10, 2005

Best Picture
Eternal Sunshine of the Spotless Mind

The 8th Online Film Critics Society Awards, honoring the best in filmmaking in 2004, were given on 10 January 2005.

== Winners and nominees ==
=== Best Picture ===
Eternal Sunshine of the Spotless Mind

- Before Sunset
- Garden State
- The Incredibles
- Sideways

=== Best Director ===
Michel Gondry – Eternal Sunshine of the Spotless Mind

- Clint Eastwood – Million Dollar Baby
- Alexander Payne – Sideways
- Martin Scorsese – The Aviator
- Zhang Yimou – Hero

=== Best Actor ===
Paul Giamatti – Sideways

- Jim Carrey – Eternal Sunshine of the Spotless Mind
- Don Cheadle – Hotel Rwanda
- Leonardo DiCaprio – The Aviator
- Jamie Foxx – Ray

=== Best Actress ===
Kate Winslet – Eternal Sunshine of the Spotless Mind

- Julie Delpy – Before Sunset
- Imelda Staunton – Vera Drake
- Hilary Swank – Million Dollar Baby
- Uma Thurman – Kill Bill: Volume 2

=== Best Supporting Actor ===
Thomas Haden Church – Sideways

- David Carradine – Kill Bill: Volume 2
- Jamie Foxx – Collateral
- Clive Owen – Closer
- Peter Sarsgaard – Kinsey

=== Best Supporting Actress ===
Cate Blanchett – The Aviator

- Laura Linney – Kinsey
- Virginia Madsen – Sideways
- Natalie Portman – Closer
- Sharon Warren – Ray

=== Best Original Screenplay ===
Eternal Sunshine of the Spotless Mind – Charlie Kaufman

- Garden State – Zach Braff
- The Incredibles – Brad Bird
- Kill Bill: Volume 2 – Quentin Tarantino
- Shaun of the Dead – Edgar Wright and Simon Pegg

=== Best Adapted Screenplay ===
Sideways – Alexander Payne and Jim Taylor

- Before Sunset – Richard Linklater, Julie Delpy and Ethan Hawke
- Closer – Patrick Marber
- Million Dollar Baby – Paul Haggis
- The Motorcycle Diaries – José Rivera

=== Best Foreign Language Film ===
Hero

- House of Flying Daggers
- Maria Full of Grace
- The Motorcycle Diaries
- A Very Long Engagement

=== Best Documentary ===
Fahrenheit 9/11

- Control Room
- Metallica: Some Kind of Monster
- Super Size Me
- Touching the Void

=== Best Animated Feature ===
The Incredibles

- Ghost in the Shell 2: Innocence
- The Polar Express
- Shrek 2
- Team America: World Police

=== Best Cinematography ===
Hero – Christopher Doyle

- The Aviator – Robert Richardson
- Collateral – Dion Beebe and Paul Cameron
- Eternal Sunshine of the Spotless Mind – Ellen Kuras
- House of Flying Daggers – Xiaoding Zhao

=== Best Editing ===
Eternal Sunshine of the Spotless Mind – Valdís Óskarsdóttir

- The Aviator – Thelma Schoonmaker
- Hero – Angie Lam, Vincent Lee and Zhai Ru
- House of Flying Daggers – Long Cheng
- Kill Bill: Volume 2 – Sally Menke

=== Best Score ===
The Incredibles – Michael Giacchino

- The Aviator – Howard Shore
- Birth – Alexandre Desplat
- Eternal Sunshine of the Spotless Mind – Jon Brion
- Hero – Tan Dun

=== Breakthrough Filmmaker ===
Zach Braff – Garden State

- Kerry Conran – Sky Captain and the World of Tomorrow
- Jared Hess – Napoleon Dynamite
- Joshua Marston – Maria Full of Grace
- Edgar Wright – Shaun of the Dead

=== Breakthrough Performer ===
Catalina Sandino Moreno – Maria Full of Grace

- Zach Braff – Garden State
- Jon Heder – Napoleon Dynamite
- Bryce Dallas Howard – The Village
- Emmy Rossum – The Phantom of the Opera
