= 2004 Los Angeles Film Critics Association Awards =

Annual US film awards ceremony

30th LAFCA Awards
- Date: December 11, 2004

Highlights
- Best Picture: Sideways

The 30th Los Angeles Film Critics Association Awards, announced on 11 December 2004 by the Los Angeles Film Critics Association, honored the best in film for 2004.

== Winners ==
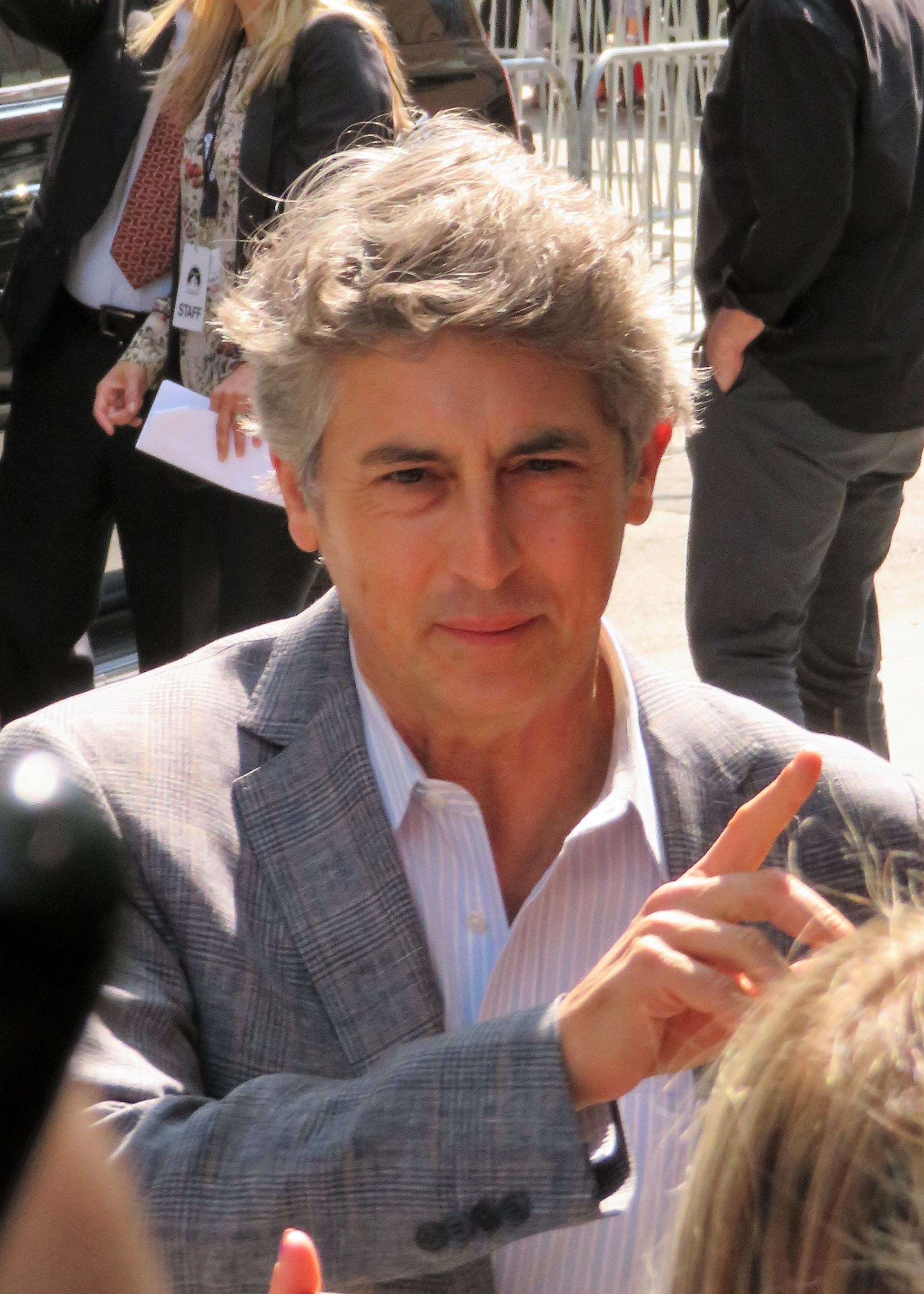
Alexander Payne, Best Director winner and Best Screenplay co-winner

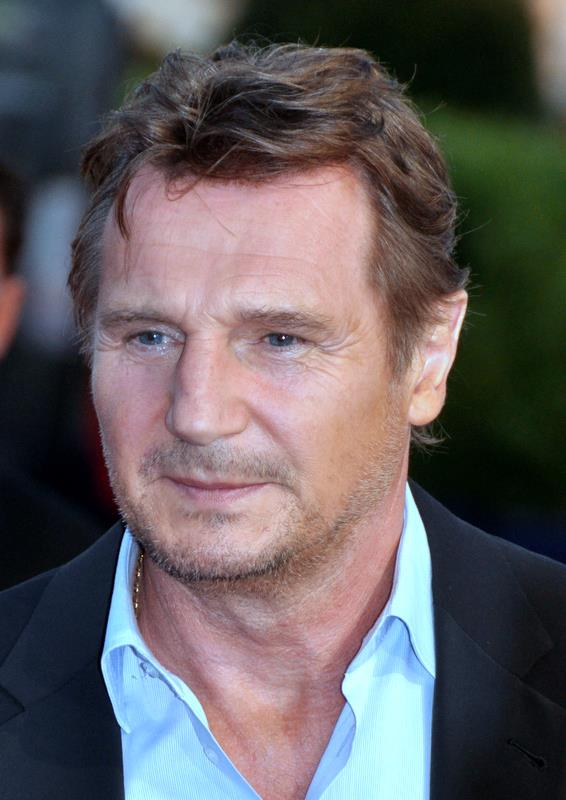
Liam Neeson, Best Actor winner

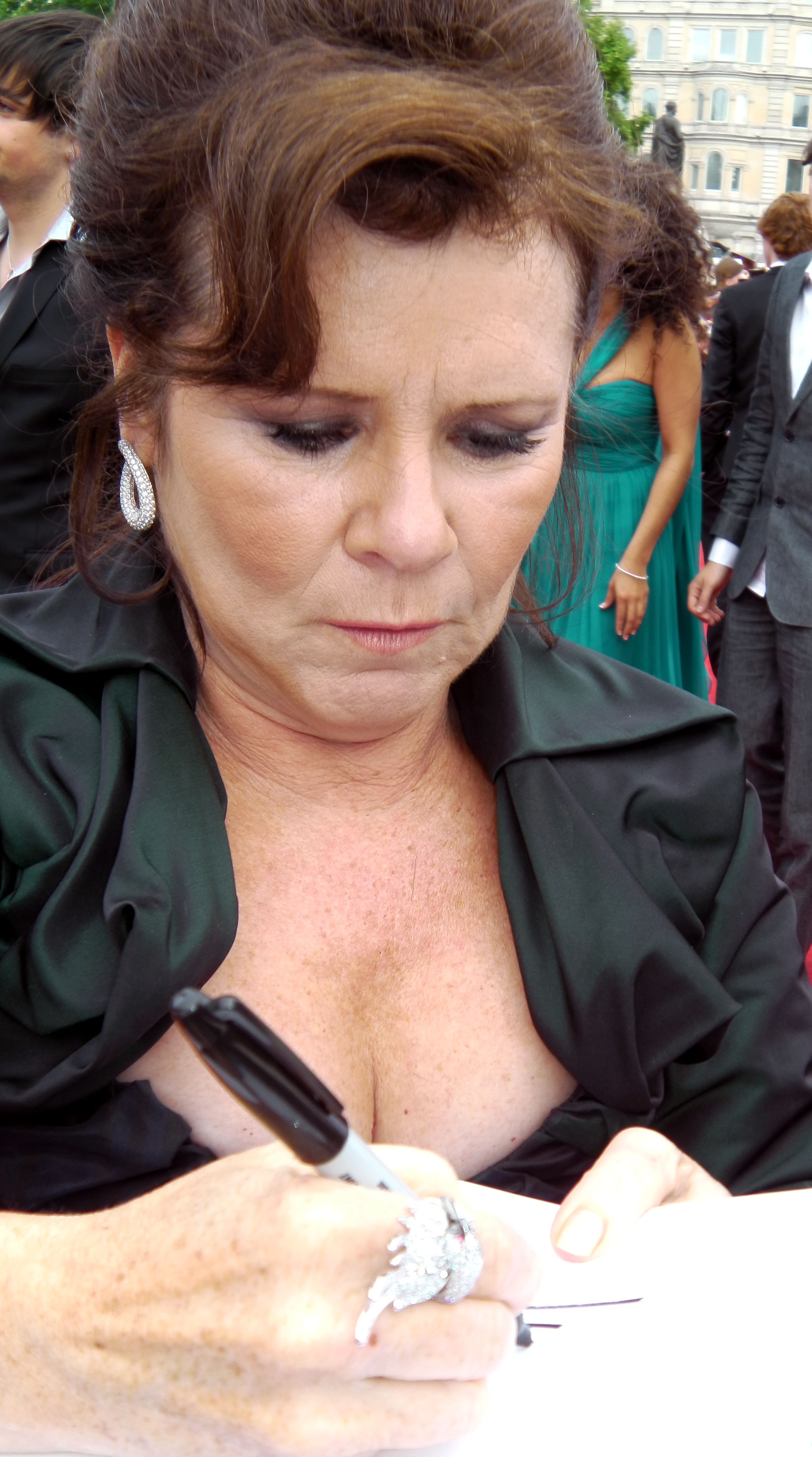
Imelda Staunton, Best Actress winner

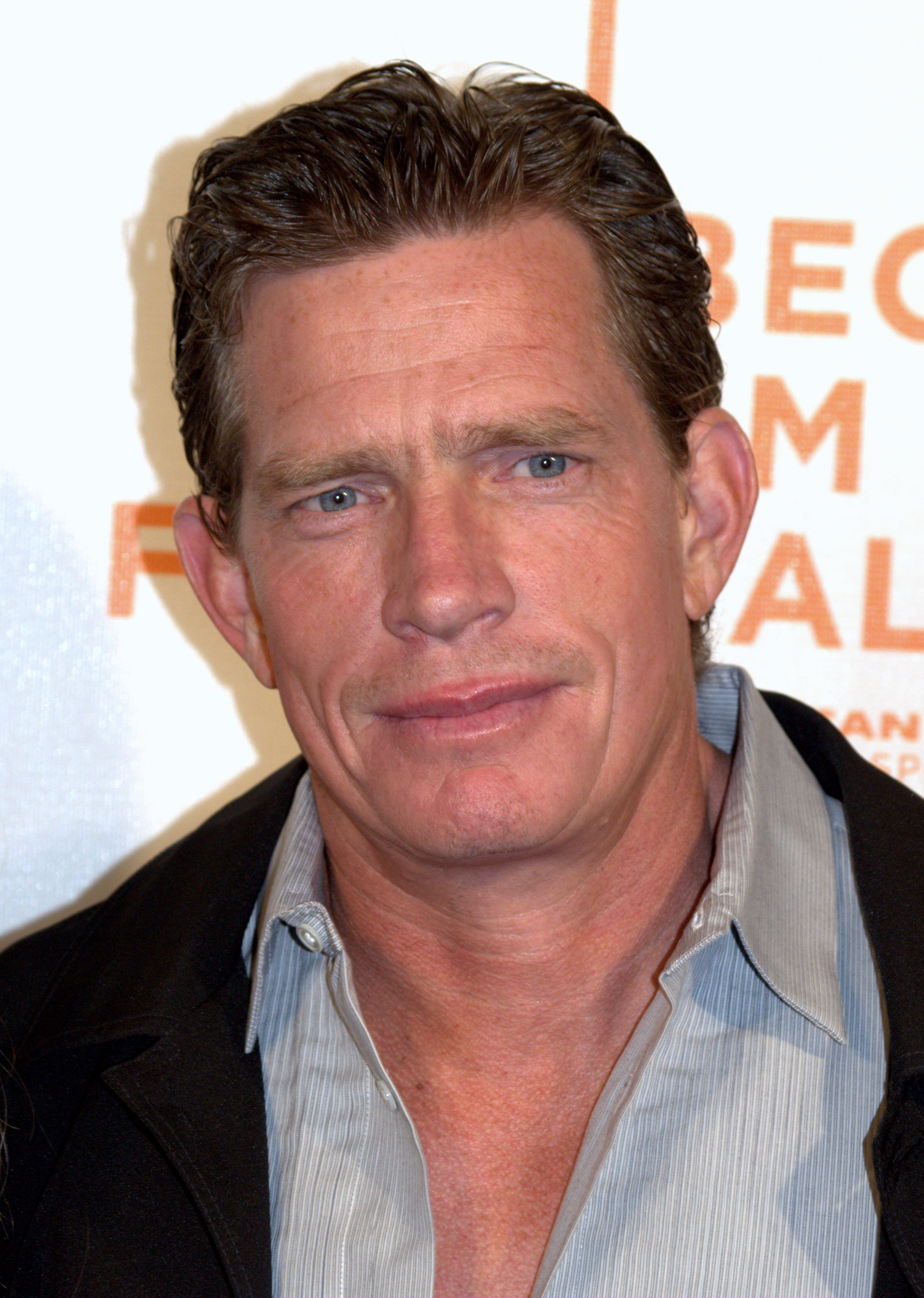
Thomas Haden Church, Best Supporting Actor winner

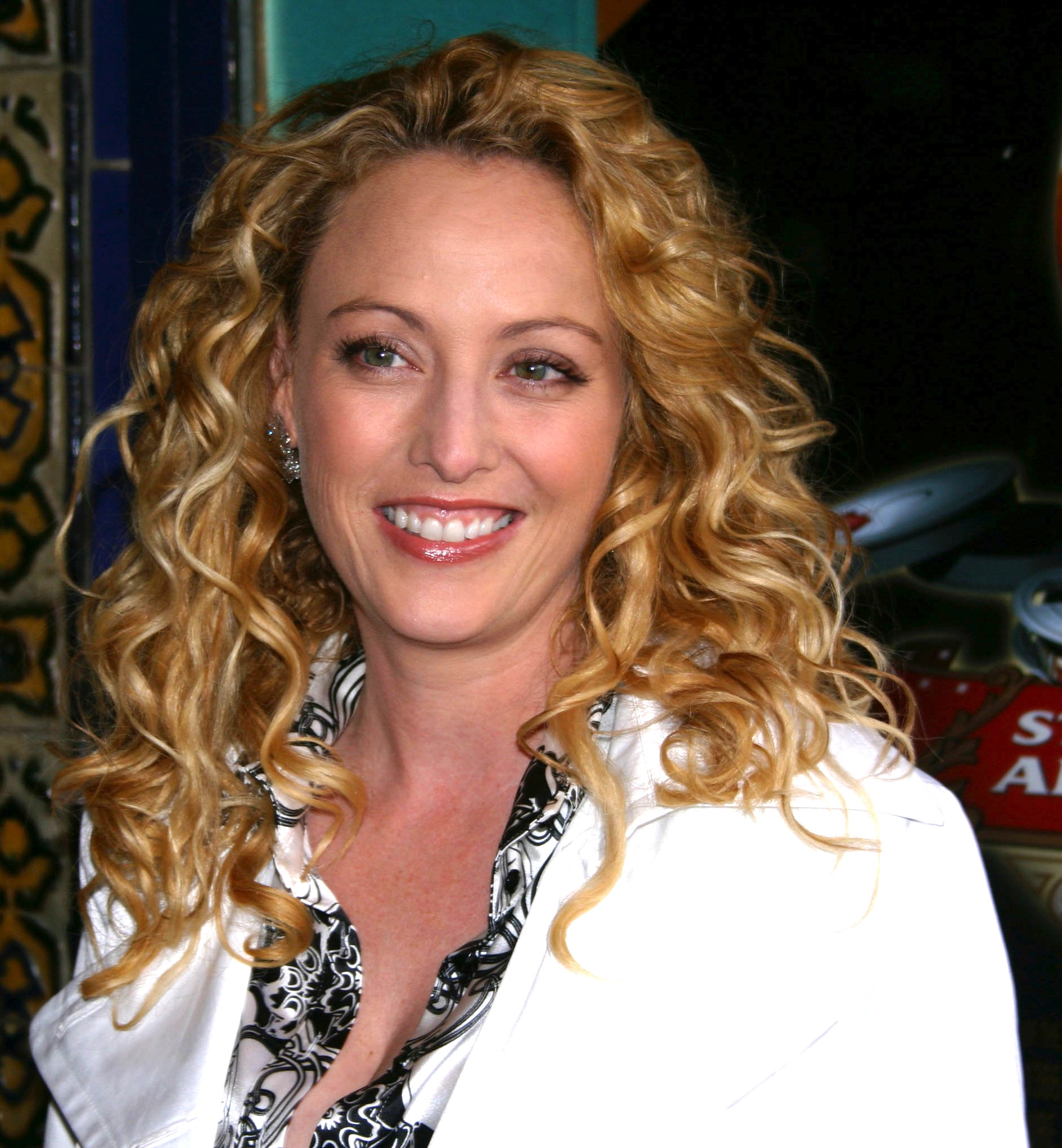
Virginia Madsen, Best Supporting Actress winner

- Best Picture:
  - Sideways
  - Runner-up: Million Dollar Baby
- Best Director:
  - Alexander Payne – Sideways
  - Runner-up: Martin Scorsese – The Aviator
- Best Actor:
  - Liam Neeson – Kinsey
  - Runner-up: Paul Giamatti – Sideways
- Best Actress:
  - Imelda Staunton – Vera Drake
  - Runner-up: Julie Delpy – Before Sunset
- Best Supporting Actor:
  - Thomas Haden Church – Sideways
  - Runner-up: Morgan Freeman – Million Dollar Baby
- Best Supporting Actress:
  - Virginia Madsen – Sideways
  - Runner-up: Cate Blanchett – The Aviator and Coffee and Cigarettes
- Best Screenplay:
  - Alexander Payne and Jim Taylor – Sideways
  - Runner-up: Charlie Kaufman – Eternal Sunshine of the Spotless Mind
- Best Cinematography:
  - Dion Beebe and Paul Cameron – Collateral
  - Runner-up: Xiaoding Zhao – House of Flying Daggers (Shi mian mai fu)
- Best Production Design:
  - Dante Ferretti – The Aviator
  - Runner-up: Huo Tingxiao – House of Flying Daggers (Shi mian mai fu)
- Best Music Score:
  - Michael Giacchino – The Incredibles
  - Runner-up: Alexandre Desplat – Birth
- Best Foreign-Language Film:
  - House of Flying Daggers (Shi mian mai fu) • China/Hong Kong
  - Runner-up: The Motorcycle Diaries (Diarios de motocicleta) • Argentina
- Best Documentary/Non-Fiction Film:
  - Born into Brothels
  - Runner-up: Fahrenheit 9/11
- Best Animation:
  - The Incredibles
- The Douglas Edwards Experimental/Independent Film/Video Award:
  - Ken Jacobs – Star Spangled to Death
- New Generation Award:
  - Joshua Marston (director) and Catalina Sandino Moreno (actress) – Maria Full of Grace
- Career Achievement Award:
  - Jerry Lewis
- Special Citation:
  - Richard Schickel and Brian Jamieson of Warner Bros. for the reconstruction of Samuel Fuller's The Big Red One.
