= Dallas–Fort Worth Film Critics Association Awards 2004 =

Awards ceremony

10th Dallas-Fort Worth Film Critics Association Awards
- Date: January 4, 2005
- Location: Dallas, Texas
- Country: United States
- Presented by: Dallas-Fort Worth Film Critics Association
- Website: dfwfilmcritics.net

The 10th Dallas–Fort Worth Film Critics Association Awards, given by the Dallas-Fort Worth Film Critics Association on 4 January 2005, honored the best in film for 2004. The organization, founded in 1990, includes 63 film critics for print, radio, television, and internet publications based in north Texas.

== Top 10 films ==
1. Million Dollar Baby (Academy Award for Best Picture)
2. Sideways
3. Finding Neverland
4. The Aviator
5. Eternal Sunshine of the Spotless Mind
6. Ray
7. Kinsey
8. The Incredibles
9. A Very Long Engagement (Un long dimanche de fiançailles)
10. Hotel Rwanda

== Winners ==
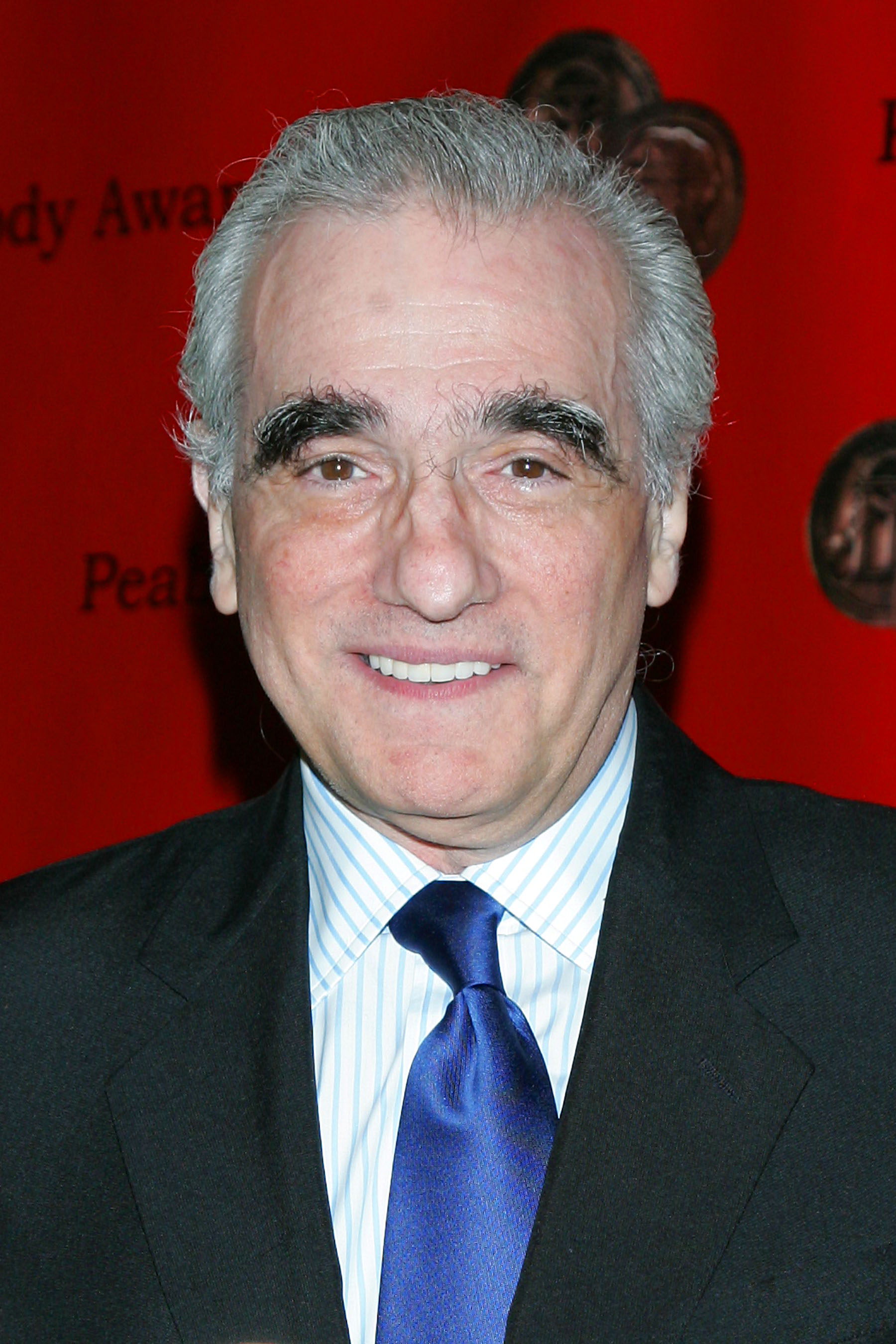
Martin Scorsese, Best Director winner

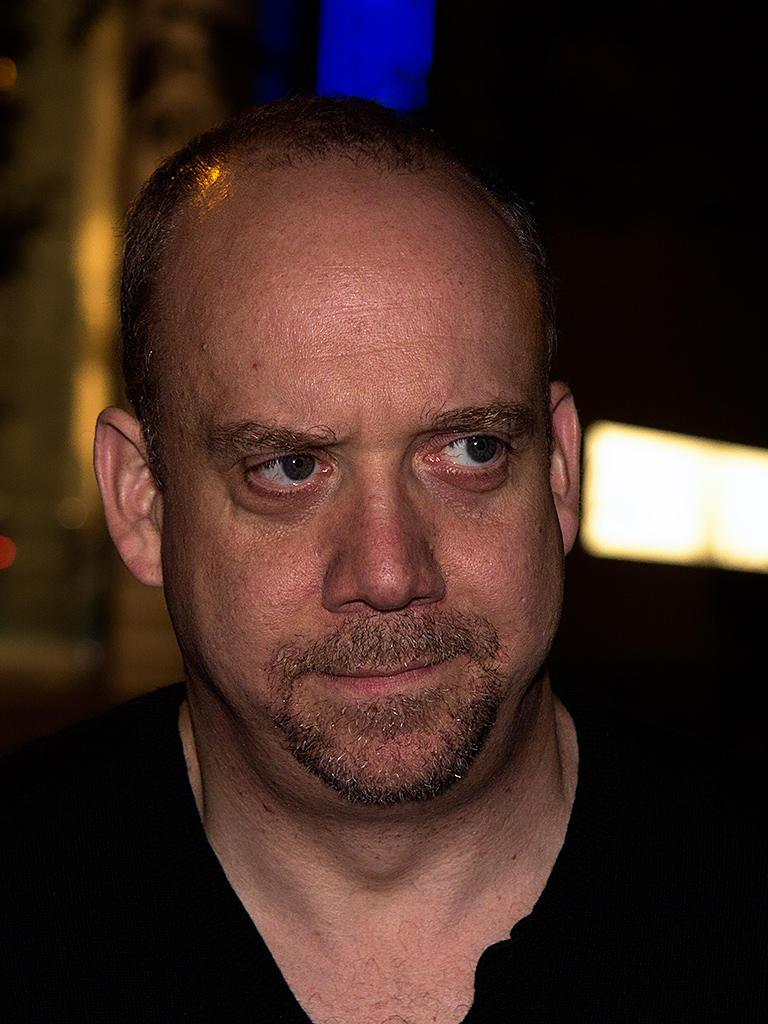
Paul Giamatti, Best Actor winner

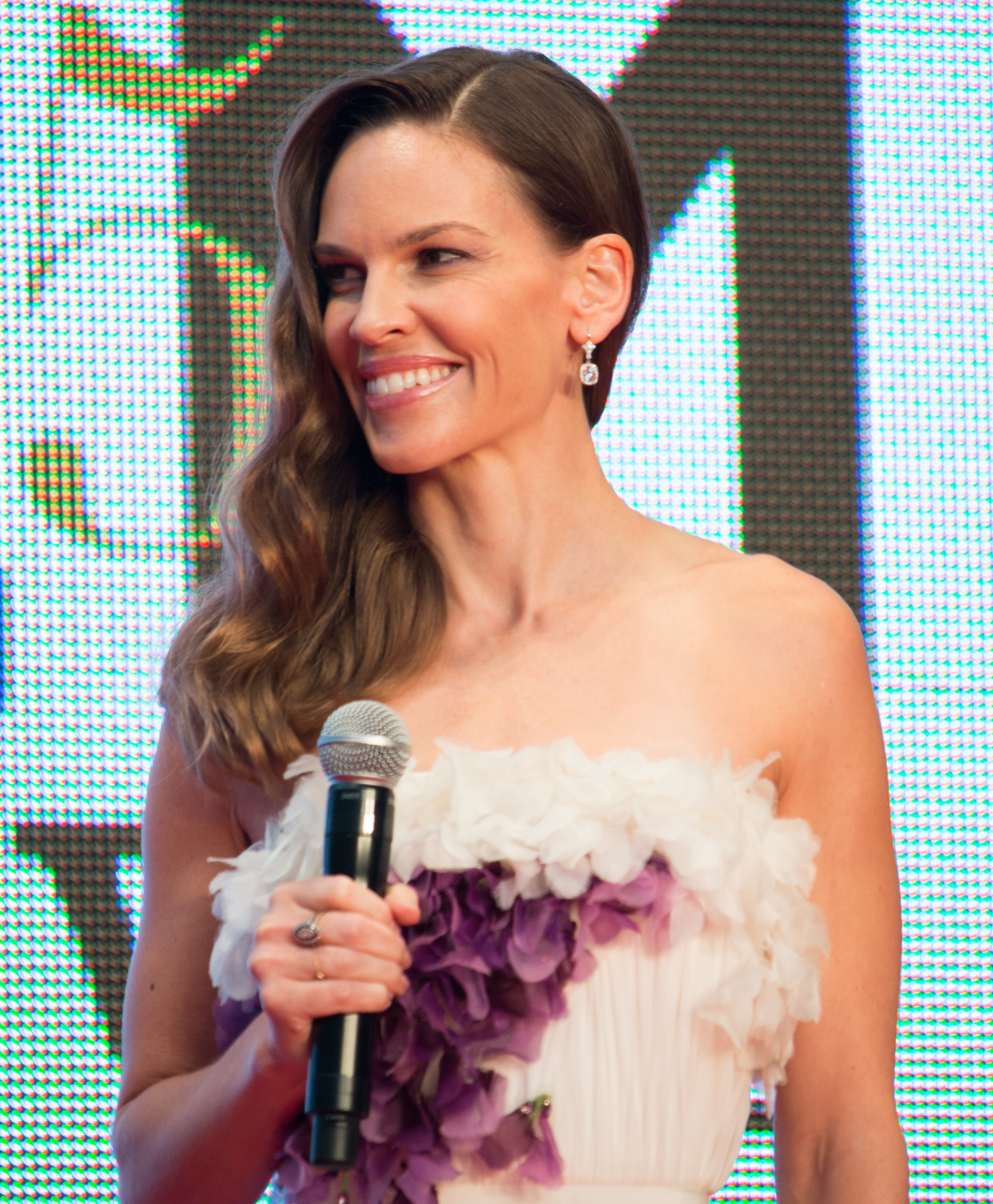
Hilary Swank, Best Actress winner

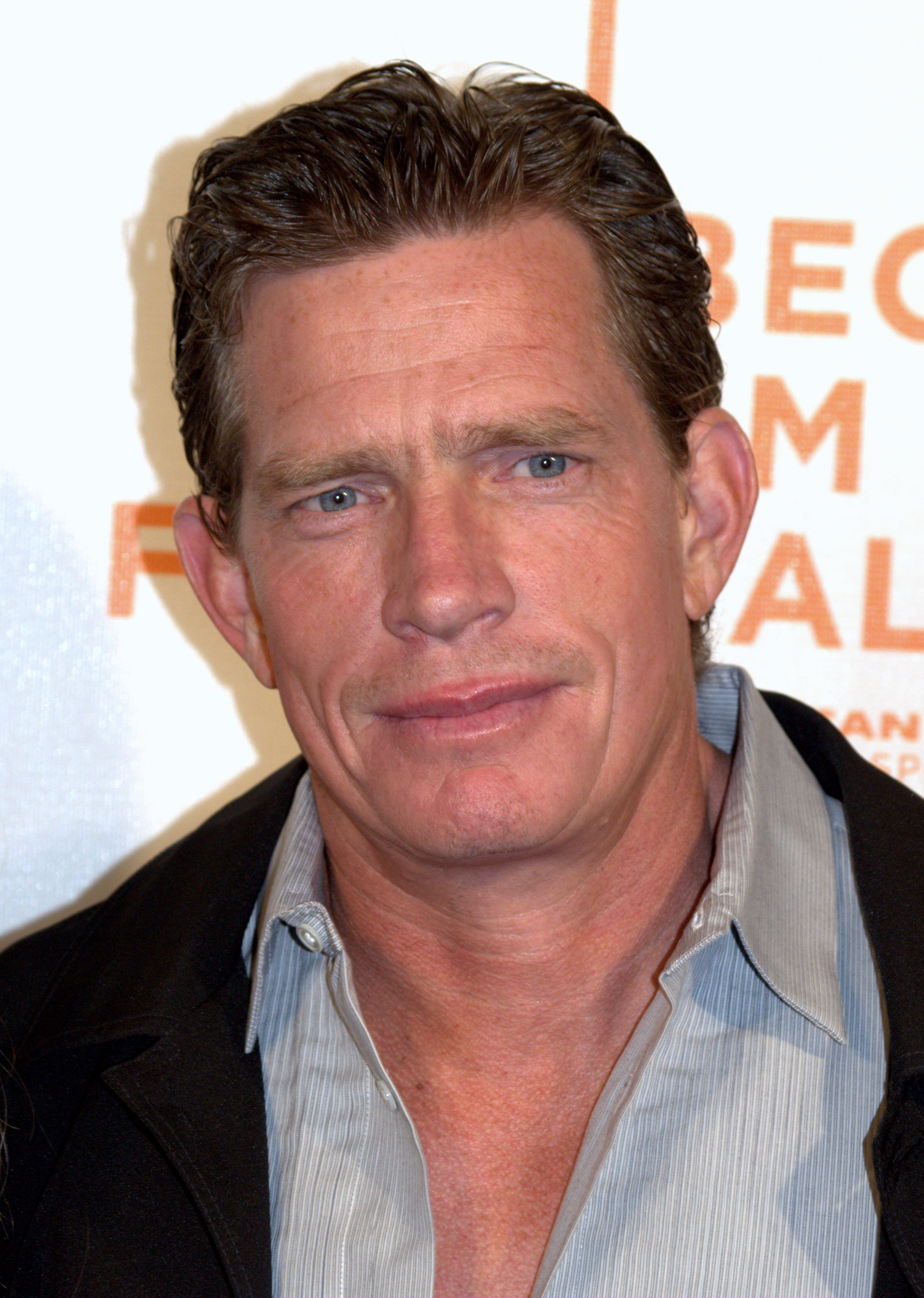
Thomas Haden Church, Best Supporting Actor winner

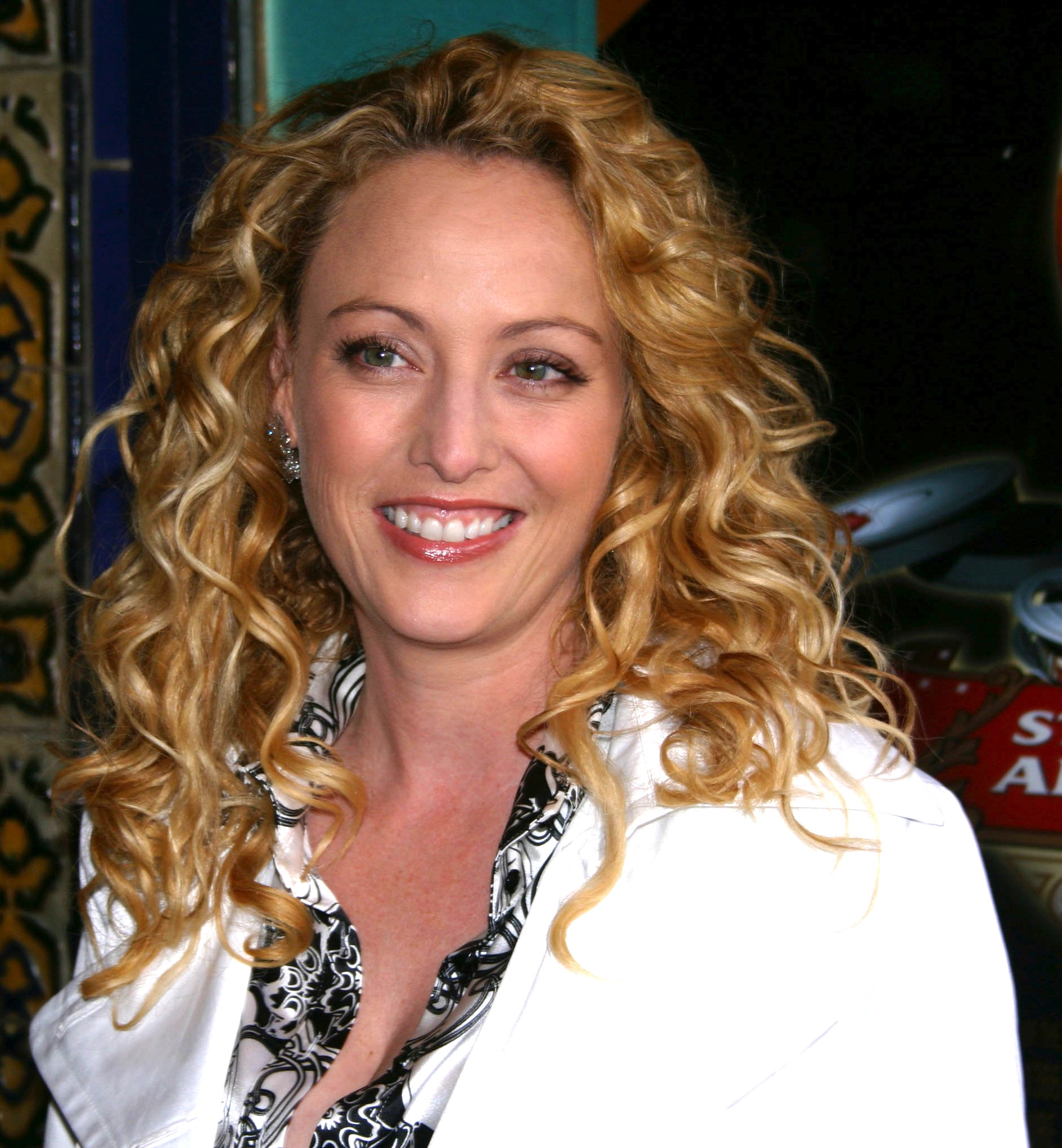
Virginia Madsen, Best Supporting Actress winner

- Best Actor:
  - Paul Giamatti – Sideways
- Best Actress:
  - Hilary Swank – Million Dollar Baby
- Best Animated Film:
  - The Incredibles
- Best Director:
  - Martin Scorsese – The Aviator
- Best Documentary Film:
  - Fahrenheit 9/11
- Best Film:
  - Million Dollar Baby
- Best Foreign Language Film:
  - A Very Long Engagement (Un long dimanche de fiançailles) • France/United States
- Best Supporting Actor:
  - Thomas Haden Church – Sideways
- Best Supporting Actress:
  - Virginia Madsen – Sideways
- Russell Smith Award:
  - Maria Full of Grace
- Worst Film:
  - Christmas with the Kranks
