= Washington D.C. Area Film Critics Association Awards 2006 =

Annual US film awards ceremony

5th WAFCA Awards
- Date: December 11, 2006

Highlights
- Best Film: United 93
- Best Director: Martin Scorsese for The Departed
- Best Actor: Forest Whitaker
- Best Actress: Helen Mirren

The 5th Washington D.C. Area Film Critics Association Awards, honoring the best in filmmaking in 2006, were given on December 11, 2006.

== Winners ==
- Best Actor
  - Forest Whitaker – The Last King of Scotland
- Best Actress
  - Helen Mirren – The Queen
- Best Animated Feature
  - Happy Feet
- Best Art Direction
  - Marie Antoinette
- Best Breakthrough Performance
  - Jennifer Hudson – Dreamgirls
- Best Cast
  - Little Miss Sunshine
- Best Director
  - Martin Scorsese – The Departed
- Best Documentary Feature
  - An Inconvenient Truth
- Best Film
  - United 93
- Best Foreign Language Film
  - El laberinto del fauno (Pan's Labyrinth), Mexico/Spain/United States
- Best Screenplay – Adapted
  - Thank You for Smoking – Jason Reitman
- Best Screenplay – Original
  - Little Miss Sunshine – Michael Arndt
- Best Supporting Actor
  - Djimon Hounsou – Blood Diamond
- Best Supporting Actress
  - Jennifer Hudson – Dreamgirls
