= Catalina Sandino Moreno =

Colombian actress (born 1981)

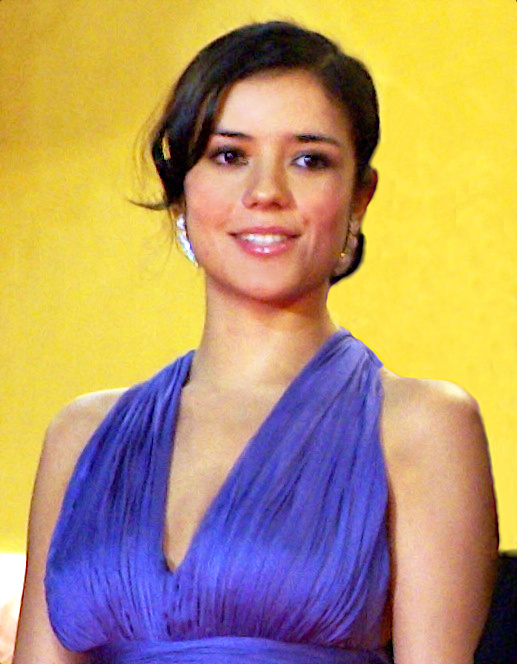
- Sandino Moreno at the 61st Cannes Film Festival in 2008
- Born: 19 April 1981 (age 45); Bogotá, Colombia
- Education: Pontifical Xavierian University; Lee Strasberg Theatre and Film Institute
- Occupation: Actress
- Years active: 2004–present
- Spouse: David Elwell (m. 2006)
- Children: 1

Catalina Sandino Moreno (born 19 April 1981) is a Colombian actress. She gained recognition for her leading titular performance in Maria Full of Grace (2004), which earned her the Silver Bear for Best Actress and a nomination for the Academy Award in the same category.

Moreno's subsequent film and television credits include Fast Food Nation (2006), Love in the Time of Cholera (2007), Che (2008), The Twilight Saga: Eclipse (2010), Roa (2013), A Most Violent Year (2014), Falling Skies (2014), American Gothic (2016), Custody (2016), The Affair (2015–2019), The Quarry (2020), Barbarians (2021), From (2022–present), Silent Night (2023), and Ballerina (2025).

== Early life ==
Catalina Sandino Moreno was born 19 April 1981 in Bogotá, Colombia. She grew up in a middle-class family; her father is a veterinarian and her mother a pathologist. She attended an English-taught school, Saint George's School in Bogotá, Colombia. Before becoming an actress, she studied advertising.

== Career ==
=== 2004–2010 ===
In 2004, Sandino Moreno landed a main role in the film Maria Full of Grace, where she was among 800 other girls casting for the lead role as María Alvarez, a Colombian girl who works in a flower plantation when she was pregnant and then as a drug mule. For her performance in the film, she received a nomination for the Academy Award for Best Actress at the 77th Academy Awards. For her performance, she also won the Silver Bear for Best Actress at the Berlin International Film Festival, shared with Charlize Theron for Monster.

After the impact of her Oscar nomination, Sandino Moreno waited three years for a role that appealed to her. She elaborated in an interview with V magazine that she felt a responsibility – as an actress, Colombian immigrant, and as a person – to perform reality, so that people learn, believing it was important to show people what is happening in the world.

In 2005, Sandino Moreno moved to New York City to study dramatic arts and to continue with her career success, and was invited to join AMPAS. In 2006, she played roles in independent film Fast Food Nation, and Paris, je t'aime, where she starred as Ana, a young immigrant mother in the segment "Loin du 16e". In 2007, she starred as Hildebranda Sánchez in Love in the Time of Cholera, based on the 1985 novel by Gabriel García Márquez. In 2008, she appeared in Steven Soderbergh's Che, playing the role of Aleida March de Guevara, the second wife of Ernesto "Che" Guevara, and attended the premiere at the 2008 Cannes Film Festival. In 2010, she played the role of vampire Maria in The Twilight Saga: Eclipse, adapted from the novel by Stephenie Meyer.

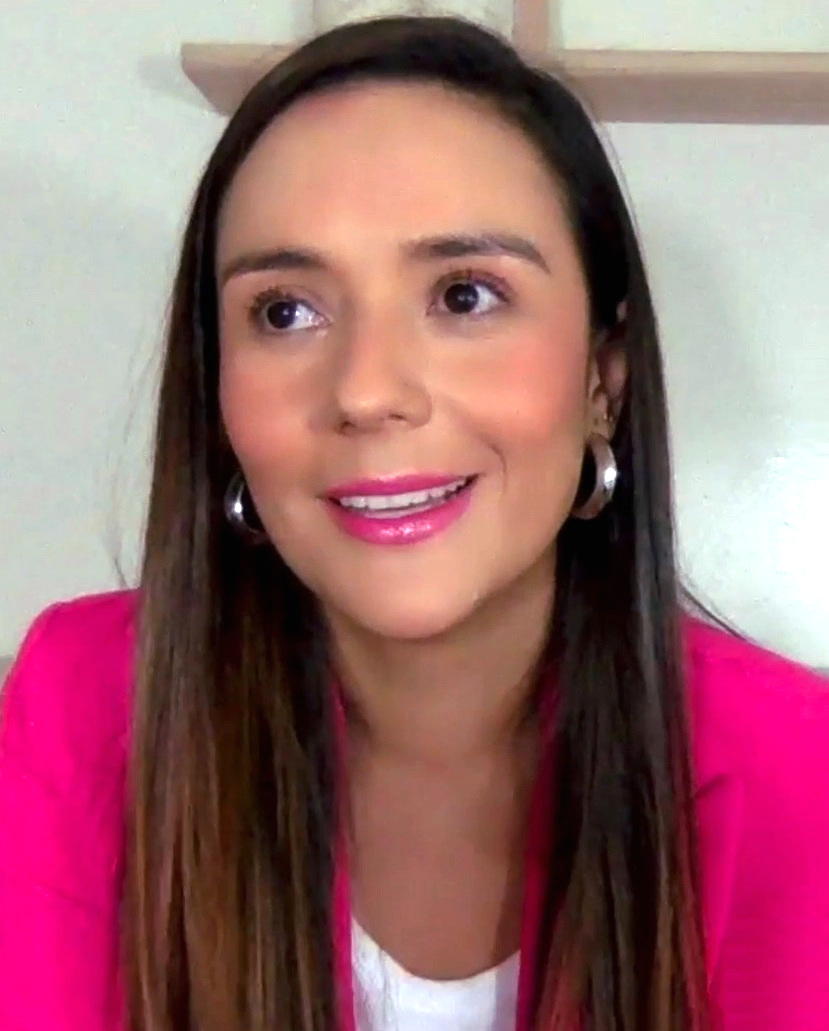
Sandino Moreno in 2022

=== 2010–present ===
After a break in her career, in November 2013, Sandino Moreno was announced to play the title role in the biopic Castro's Daughter, based on Alina Fernández's autobiography of the same name, though the film was not produced. She starred in films Roa (2013), and appeared in A Most Violent Year (2014). On October 20, 2014, it was announced that she would be joining the fifth and final season of Falling Skies in a recurring role as Isabella.

In 2016, Sandino Moreno starred in the TV series American Gothic as a recurring character, Christina Morales. In the same year, she returned to the world of cinema in the movie Custody (2016). The film was premiered at the Tribeca Film Festival.

Sandino Moreno plays Tabitha Matthews, a leading role in the sci-fi horror series From, which originally premiered on February 20, 2022 on Epix (which later rebranded to MGM+). The show has run for four seasons, with its fifth and final season set to release in 2027. In December 2022, Sandino Moreno was announced to join the John Wick spin-off film Ballerina as Lena Macarro. In 2023, she played Saya Godluck in the John Woo action thriller Silent Night.

== Personal life ==
Sandino Moreno was one of People magazine's "50 Most Beautiful Women" in 2005.

Sandino Moreno met motion picture electrician David Elwell while working on Maria Full of Grace. The couple married on 15 April 2006 in a small ceremony held in Cartagena de Indias.

== Filmography ==
Film
| Year | Film | Role | Notes |
|---|---|---|---|
| 2004 | Maria Full of Grace | María Álvarez | Berlin Film Festival Award for Best Actress (Tied with Charlize Theron); Independent Spirit Award for Best Actress; Golden India Catalina for Best Actress; Gotham Independent Film Award for Breakthrough Actor; Online Film Critics Society Award for Best Breakthrough Performance; Los Angeles Film Critics Association Awards New Generation Award; Chicago Film Critics Association Awards; Golden Space Needle Award; Seattle International Film Festival Best Actress; Nominated – Academy Award for Best Actress; Nominated – Critics' Choice Movie Award for Best Actress; Nominated – Dallas-Fort Worth Film Critics Association Award for Best Actress; Nominated – London Film Critics Circle Award for Actress of the Year; Nominated – Satellite Award for Best Actress – Motion Picture Drama; Nominated – SAG Award for Outstanding Lead Actress |
| 2006 | Journey to the End of the Night | Angie | |
| 2006 | Paris, je t'aime | Ana | (Segment "Loin du 16e") |
| 2006 | Fast Food Nation | Sylvia | |
| 2006 | The Hottest State | Sarah | |
| 2007 | The Heart of the Earth | Blanca Bosco | |
| 2007 | Love in the Time of Cholera | Hildebranda Sanchez | |
| 2008 | Che Part One: The Argentine | Aleida March de Guevara | |
| 2008 | Che Part Two: Guerrilla | Aleida March de Guevara | |
| 2010 | La Siguiente Estación | Eva | Short, executive producer |
| 2010 | The Twilight Saga: Eclipse | Maria | Uncredited |
| 2012 | For Greater Glory: The True Story of Cristiada | Adriana | |
| 2013 | Magic Magic | Barbara | |
| 2013 | Roa | María de Roa | |
| 2013 | A Stranger in Paradise | Jules | |
| 2013 | Medeas | Christina | |
| 2014 | At the Devil's Door | Leigh | |
| 2014 | Swelter | Carmen | |
| 2014 | A Most Violent Year | Luisa | |
| 2016 | Custody | Sarah Diaz | |
| 2016 | Incarnate | Camilla Marquez | |
| 2017 | The Mystery of Casa Matusita | Lucy | |
| 2020 | The Quarry | Celia | |
| 2021 | Barbarians | Eva | |
| 2023 | Silent Night | Saya Godluck | |
| 2025 | Ballerina | Lena Macarro | |
| 2026 | The Rip | Det. Lolo Salazar | |

Television
| Year | Title | Role | Notes |
|---|---|---|---|
| 2013 | The Bridge | Alma Ruiz | 9 episodes |
| 2014 | Red Band Society | Eva Palacios | 3 episodes |
| 2015 | East Los High | Carmen Ramirez | 4 episodes |
| 2015 | Falling Skies | Isabella | 6 episodes |
| 2015–2019 | The Affair | Luisa León | 29 episodes |
| 2016 | American Gothic | Christina Morales | 6 episodes |
| 2019 | Room 104 | Maria | Episode: "Rogue" |
| 2022–present | From | Tabitha Mathews | Main role |

== Performer ==
- "Que Linda Manita" – 2006 (Paris, je t'aime Soundtrack)

== See also ==
- List of actors with Academy Award nominations
