= Washington D.C. Area Film Critics Association Awards 2004 =

Filmmaking award event

3rd WAFCA Awards
- Date: December 17, 2004

Highlights
- Best Film: Eternal Sunshine of the Spotless Mind
- Best Director: Michel Gondry for Eternal Sunshine of the Spotless Mind
- Best Actor: Jamie Foxx
- Best Actress: Imelda Staunton

The 3rd Washington D.C. Area Film Critics Association Awards, honoring the best in filmmaking in 2004, were given on December 17, 2004.

== Winners ==
- Best Film
  - Eternal Sunshine of the Spotless Mind
- Best Actor
  - Jamie Foxx – Ray
- Best Actress
  - Imelda Staunton – Vera Drake
- Best Supporting Actor
  - Jamie Foxx – Collateral
- Best Supporting Actress
  - Cate Blanchett – The Aviator
- Best Director
  - Michel Gondry – Eternal Sunshine of the Spotless Mind
- Best Ensemble
  - Eternal Sunshine of the Spotless Mind
- Best Original Screenplay
  - Charlie Kaufman – Eternal Sunshine of the Spotless Mind
- Best Adapted Screenplay
  - Alexander Payne and Jim Taylor – Sideways
- Best Foreign Language Film
  - Maria Full of Grace
- Best Animated Feature
  - The Incredibles
- Best Documentary
  - Fahrenheit 9/11
