= An Ordinary Man (book) =

2006 autobiography

- Author: Paul Rusesabagina with Tom Zoellner
- Language: English
- Subject: Rwandan genocide, Hôtel des Mille Collines
- Genre: Autobiography, Memoir
- Publisher: Viking Press, Penguin Books (paperback)
- Publication date: April 6, 2006
- Publication place: United States
- Media type: Print (Hardcover, Paperback), eBook, Audiobook
- Pages: 224
- ISBN: 978-1101201312

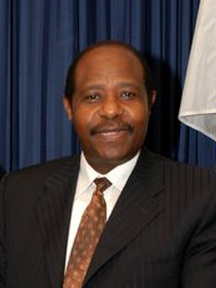
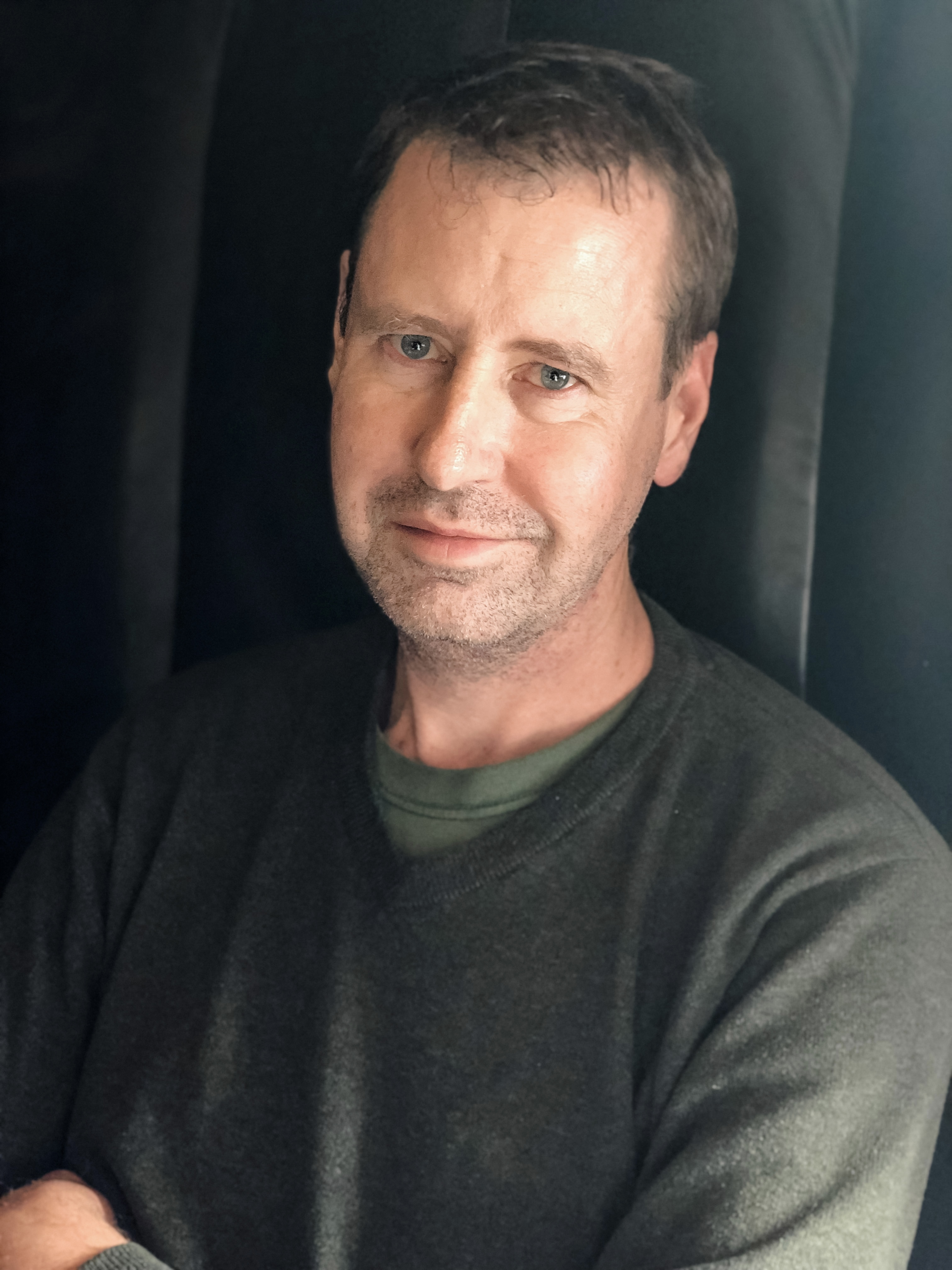
Paul Rusesabagina (left) and Tom Zoellner (right).

An Ordinary Man is a 2006 autobiographical book by human rights activist Paul Rusesabagina with co-author Tom Zoellner. The book follows Rusesabagina as he manages the Hôtel des Mille Collines during the Rwandan genocide. It was published by Viking Press, with a paperback version a year later by Penguin Books. A core component of the book is the heavy focus on the use of words as a weapon.

== Synopsis ==
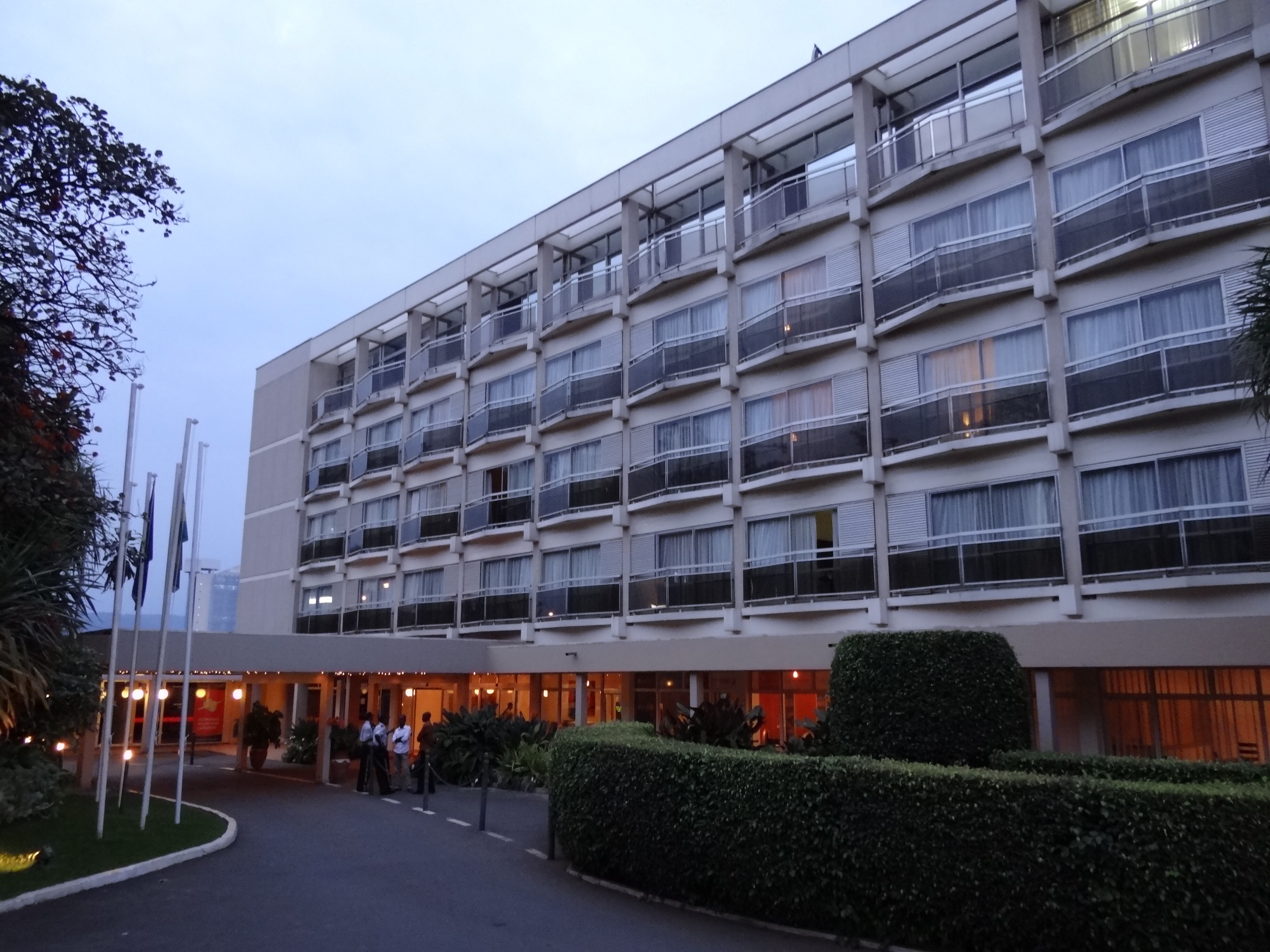
The Hotel des Mille Collines.

The book introduces Rusesabagina's childhood in Rwanda, being born from a Hutu father and Tutsi mother. At the age of 5, Rusesabagina encounters his first experience with Rwanda's ethnic violence during the Hutu Revolution of 1959. After Rusesabagina moved to Kigali in 1978, the book focuses on his marriages and career of hotel management working for Sabena at the Mille Collines.

By 1994, Rusesabagina was assistant general manager of the Mille Collines. While the Rwandan Civil War was raging in the country, Rusesabagina hosted international visitors at the Mille Collines. After Rwandan president Juvénal Habyarimana, a Hutu, was assassinated, the Rwandan genocide began. The Interahamwe, Impuzamugambi, and many other militant groups began killing Tutsis and Tutsi sympathizers. Rusesabagina turned the Mille Collines into a safe haven, using bribes and flattery to keep everyone in the hotel safe. Rusesabagina used his relationship with Augustin Bizimungu to dissuade the Interahamwe from attacking the hotel. On the final day, all the refugees were evacuated as part of a prisoner exchange between the Hutu-led Rwandan Armed Forces and the Tutsi rebel army, the Rwandan Patriotic Front.

The book concludes with his life as an activist in Europe and the historical drama film Hotel Rwanda, which was based on his actions.

== Reception ==
Simon Garfield, a writer at The Observer, praised the memoir for its tension, compelling build-up, and a lack of anger.

The audiobook edition was awarded a starred review by Publishers Weekly, which praised the narrator's performance and Rusesabagina's simple and straightforward prose.
