= Frameup =

Falsely prove someone guilty of a crime

In United States criminal law, a frame-up (frameup) or set-up is the act of falsely implicating (framing) someone in a crime by providing fabricated evidence or testimony. In British usage, to frame, stitch-up, or fit-up is to maliciously or dishonestly incriminate someone or set them up, in the sense trap or ensnare.

While incriminating those who are innocent might be done out of sheer malice, framing is primarily used as a distraction. Generally, the person who is framing someone else is the actual perpetrator of the crime. In other cases it is an attempt by law enforcement to get around due process. Motives include getting rid of political dissidents or "correcting" what they see as the court's mistake. Some lawbreakers will try to claim they were framed as a defense strategy.

== Technique ==
=== In labor disputes ===
Frameups in labor disputes sometimes swing public opinion one way or the other. In Massachusetts, during the 1912 Lawrence Textile Strike, Massachusetts State Police officers acting on a tip discovered dynamite and blamed it on the Industrial Workers of the World union. National media echoed an anti-union message. Later, the police revealed that the dynamite had been wrapped in a magazine addressed to the son of the former mayor. The man had received an unexplained payment from the largest of the employers. Exposed, the plot swung public sympathy to the IWW.

=== In police operations ===
A frameup where a police officer shoots an unarmed suspect and then places a weapon near the body is a form of police misconduct known as a "throw down". This is used to justify the shooting by making it appear that the officer fired in self-defence or to defend other bystanders.

== Notable frame-ups ==
- Dreyfus affair (1894-1906), in which Alfred Dreyfus, a Jewish soldier of the French Army was framed for treason and sent to Devil's Island before being exonerated.
- Carl Ingold Jacobson, Los Angeles City Council member, framed on a morals charge in 1927.
- Arthur Allan Thomas, New Zealand farmer convicted of the 1970 Crewe murders in Pukekawa, Waikato, and later acquitted after it was found police had planted evidence at the crime scene.
- László Rajk, a Hungarian Communist Party politician accused of being a "Titoist spy" c. 1949. The injustice of this trial helped to trigger the Hungarian Revolution of 1956 against the communist Hungarian People's Republic.
- Muhammad Abdul Aziz and Khalil Islam, two members of the Nation of Islam who were falsely convicted for involvement in the assassination of Malcolm X in 1965. They were exonerated in 2021 after an investigation by New York County District Attorney Cyrus Vance Jr. in response to the 2020 Netflix special Who Killed Malcolm X?
- Kylie Moore-Gilbert, an Australian-British academic and expert on Islamic studies, was framed and imprisoned in Iran from 2018 to 2020, on a charge of what is thought to be espionage.
- Paul Rusesabagina, a Rwandan politician, and the former manager of the Hôtel des Mille Collines in Kigali during a period in which it housed 1,268 Hutu and Tutsi refugees from the Interahamwe militia during the Rwandan genocide; as a result, none of these refugees were hurt or killed during the attacks. He was framed and arrested by Paul Kagame's Rwandan Patriotic Front government in 2020, on charges of terrorism, arson, kidnap and "murder perpetrated against unarmed, innocent Rwandan civilians on Rwandan territory" for his involvement with the opposition PDR-Ihumure.

== See also ==
- False flag
- Framing (social sciences)
- Identity theft
- Joe job
- Kangaroo court
- Miscarriage of justice
- Presumption of guilt
- Perverting the course of justice
- Scapegoat
- Show trial
