= 11th Screen Actors Guild Awards =

- Awarded for: Outstanding motion picture and primetime television performances
- Date: February 5, 2005
- Location: Shrine Auditorium; Los Angeles, California
- Country: United States
- Presented by: Screen Actors Guild
- Website: www.sagawards.org

Television/radio coverage
- Network: TNT

The 11th Screen Actors Guild Awards, awarded by the Screen Actors Guild and honoring the best achievements in film and television performances for the year 2004, took place on February 5, 2005. The ceremony, for the 9th consecutive time was held at the Shrine Exposition Center in Los Angeles, California, and was televised live by TNT.

The nominees were announced on January 11, 2005 by Rosario Dawson and James Denton at Los Angeles' Pacific Design Center's Silver Screen Theater. The ceremony is notable for a rare feat attained by Jamie Foxx, who was nominated in four categories, making him the first actor to receive this amount of nominations in the same year.

== Winners and nominees ==
Winners are listed first and highlighted in boldface.

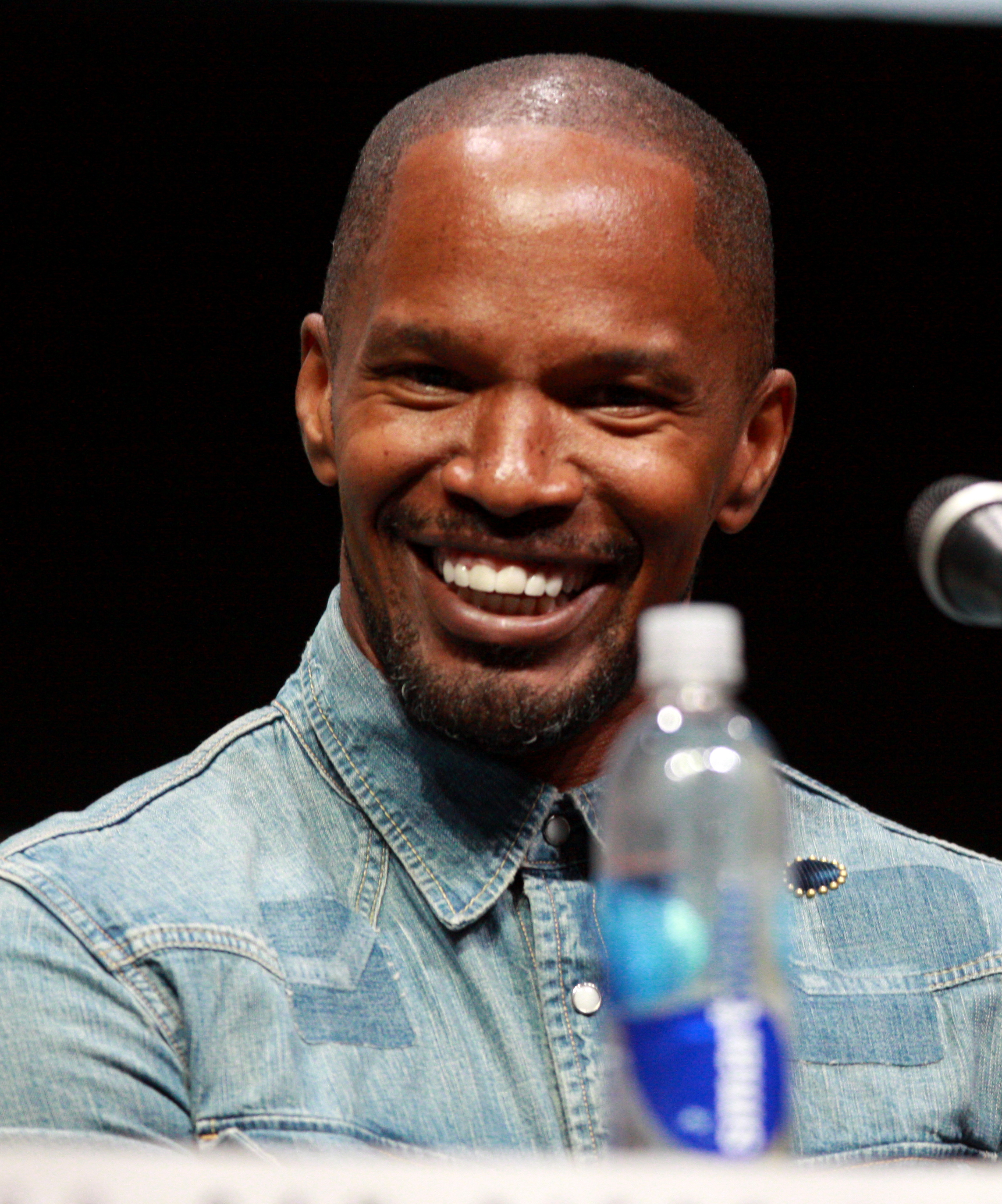
Jamie Foxx, Outstanding Performance by a Male Actor in a Leading Role winner

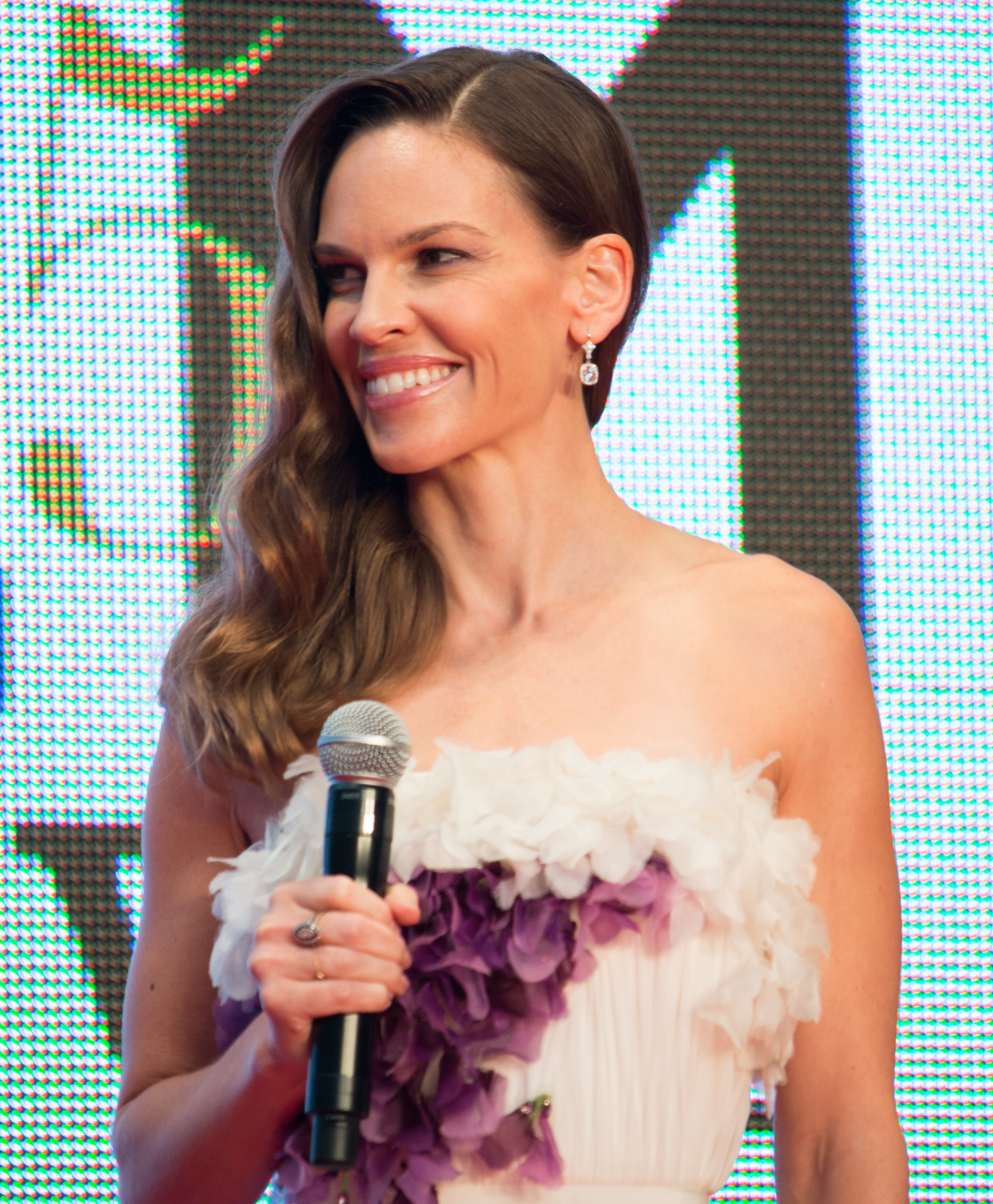
Hilary Swank, Outstanding Performance by a Female Actor in a Leading Role winner

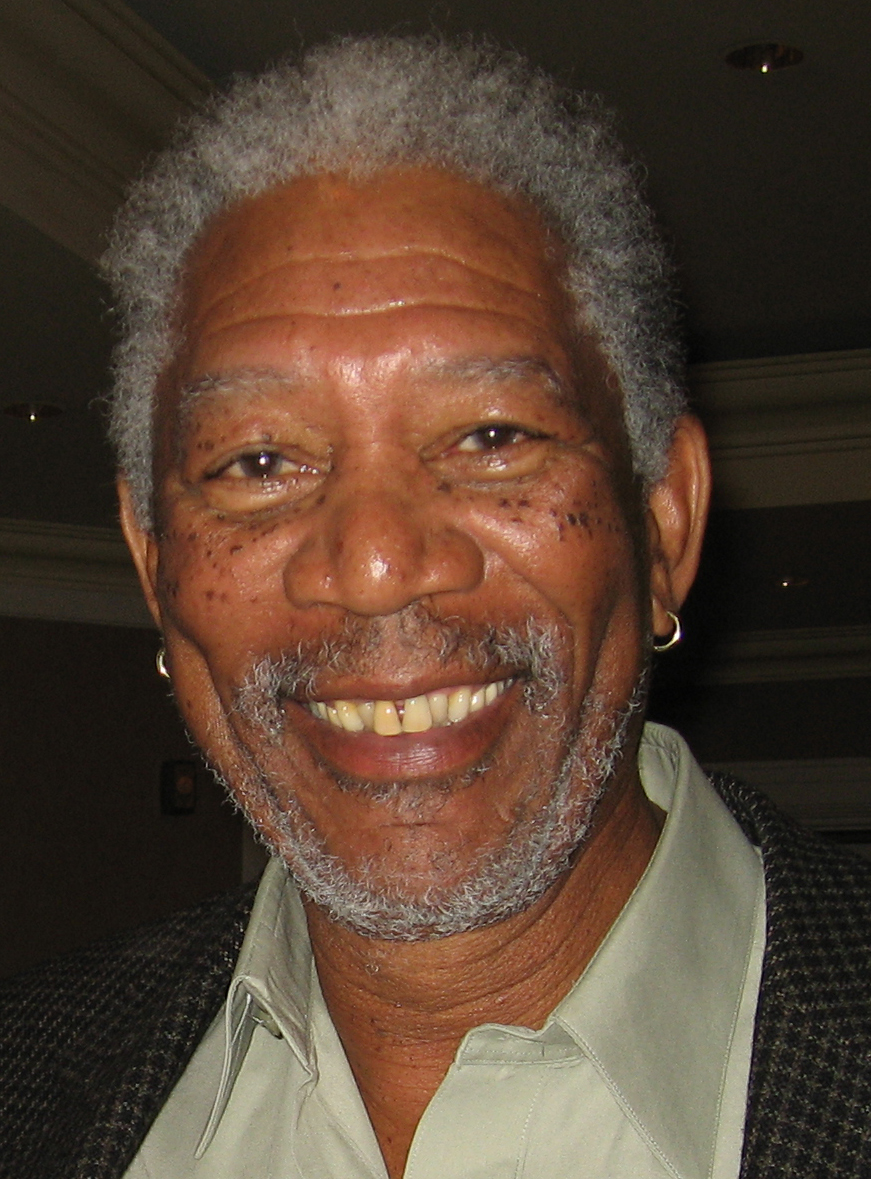
Morgan Freeman, Outstanding Performance by a Male Actor in a Supporting Role winner

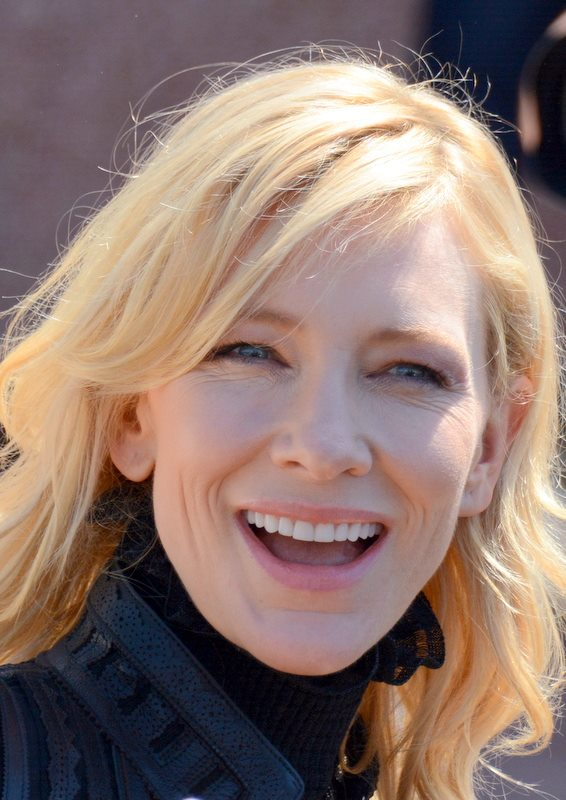
Cate Blanchett, Outstanding Performance by a Female Actor in a Supporting Role winner

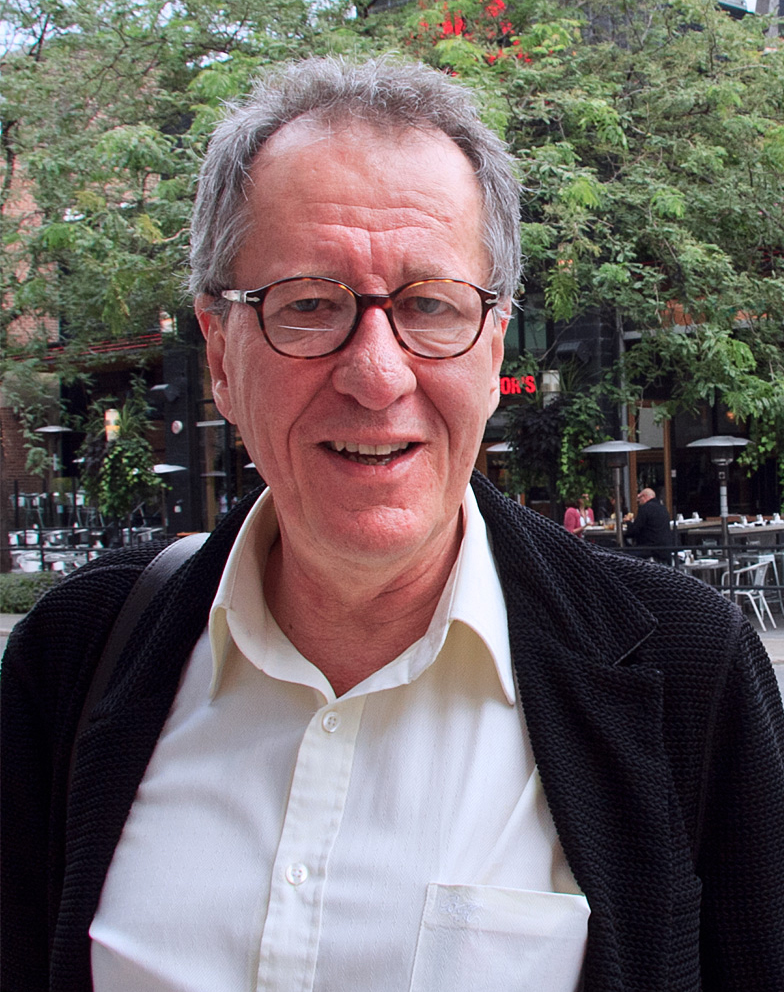
Geoffrey Rush, Outstanding Performance by a Male Actor in a Miniseries or Television Movie winner

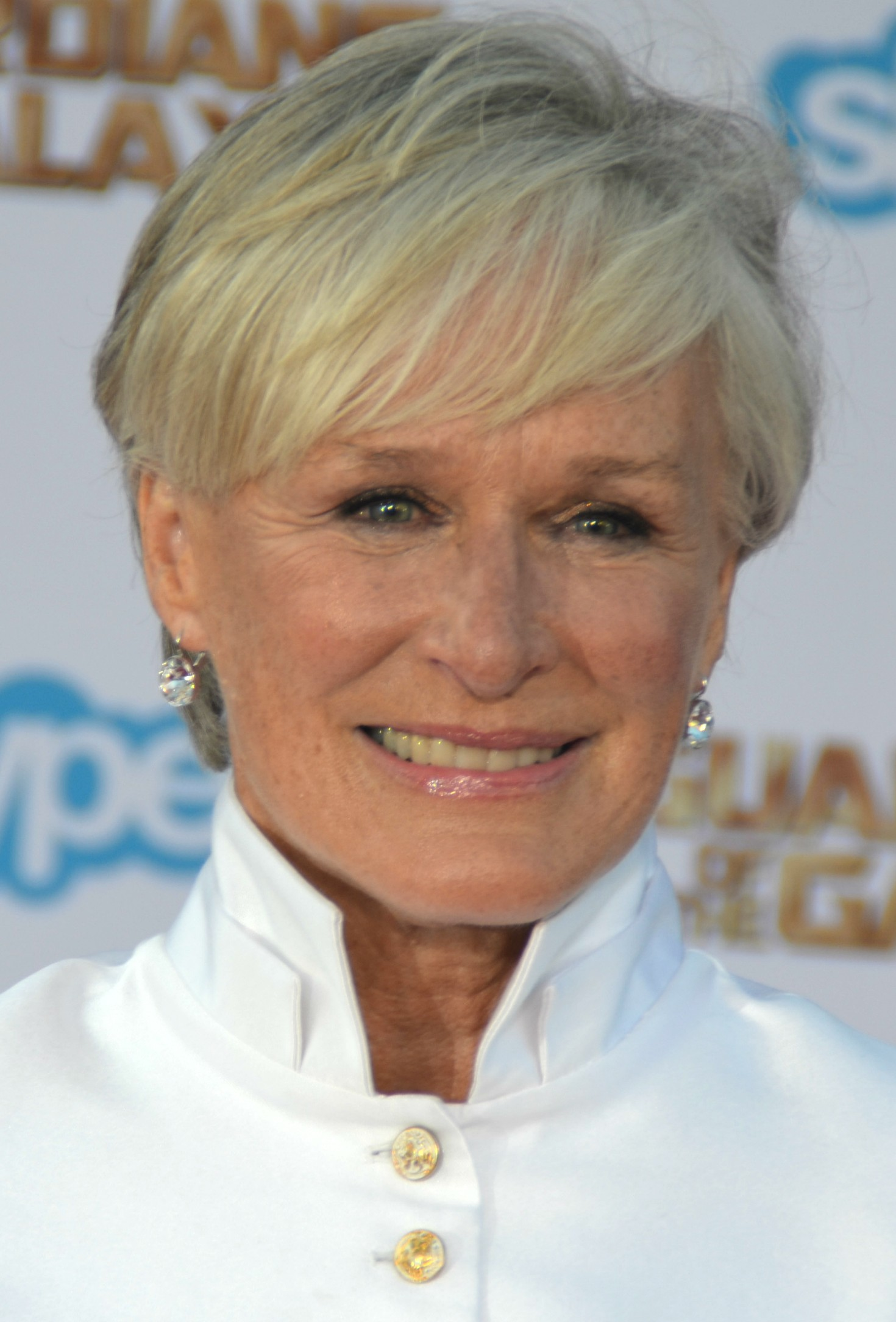
Glenn Close, Outstanding Performance by a Female Actor in a Miniseries or Television Movie winner

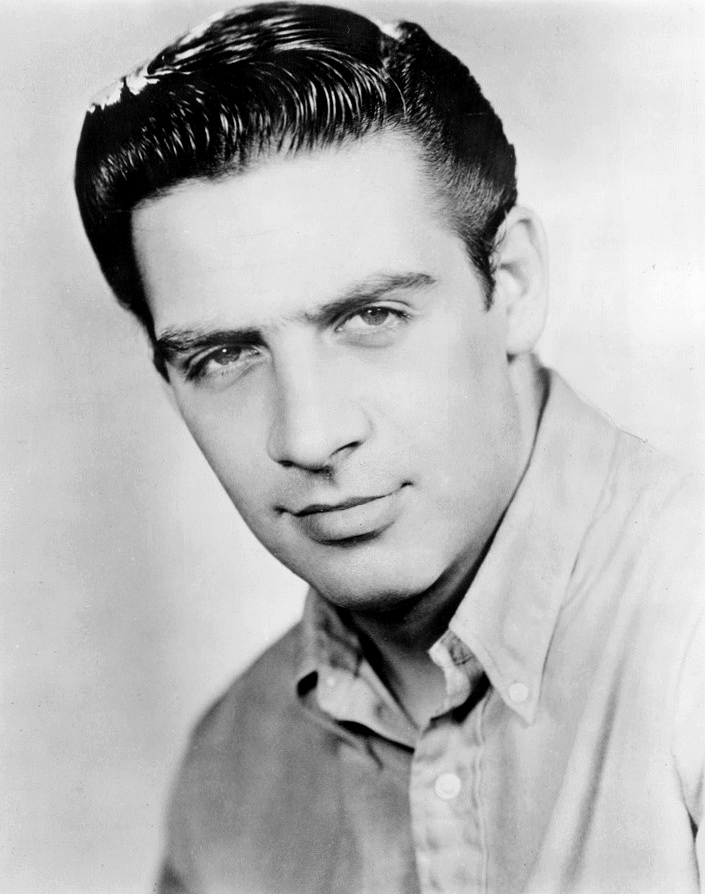
Jerry Orbach, Outstanding Performance by a Male Actor in a Drama Series winner

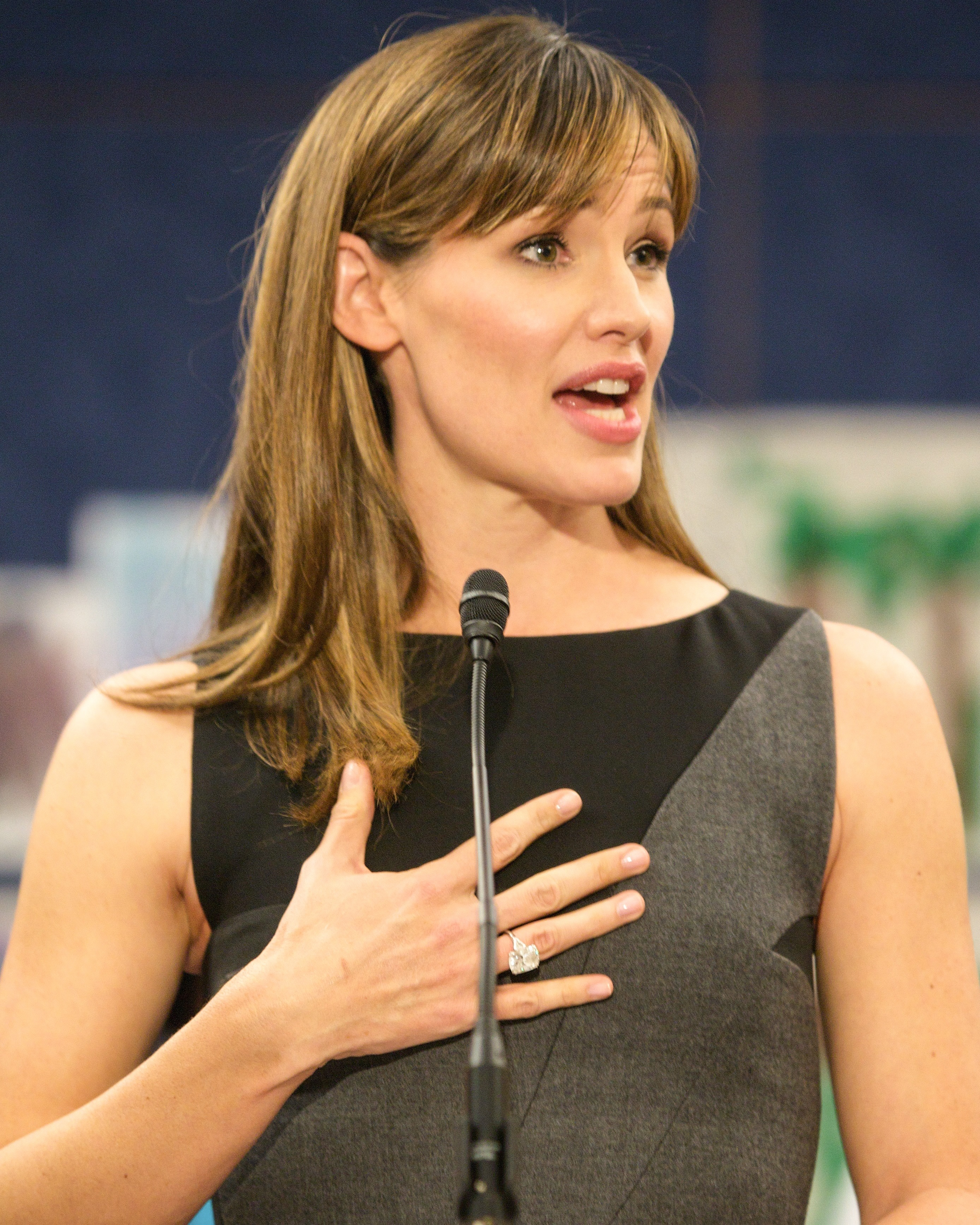
Jennifer Garner, Outstanding Performance by a Female Actor in a Drama Series winner

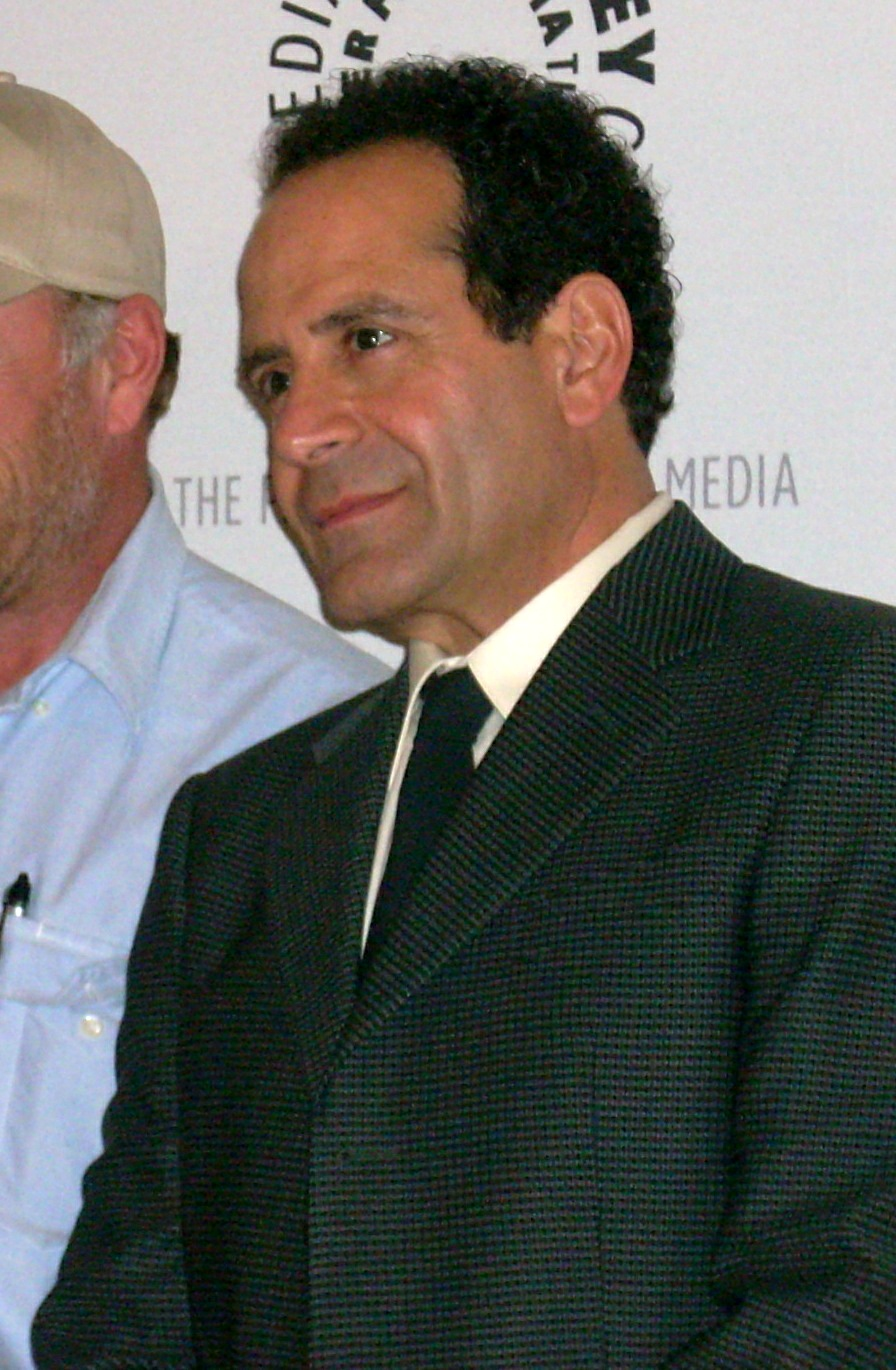
Tony Shalhoub, Outstanding Performance by a Male Actor in a Comedy Series winner

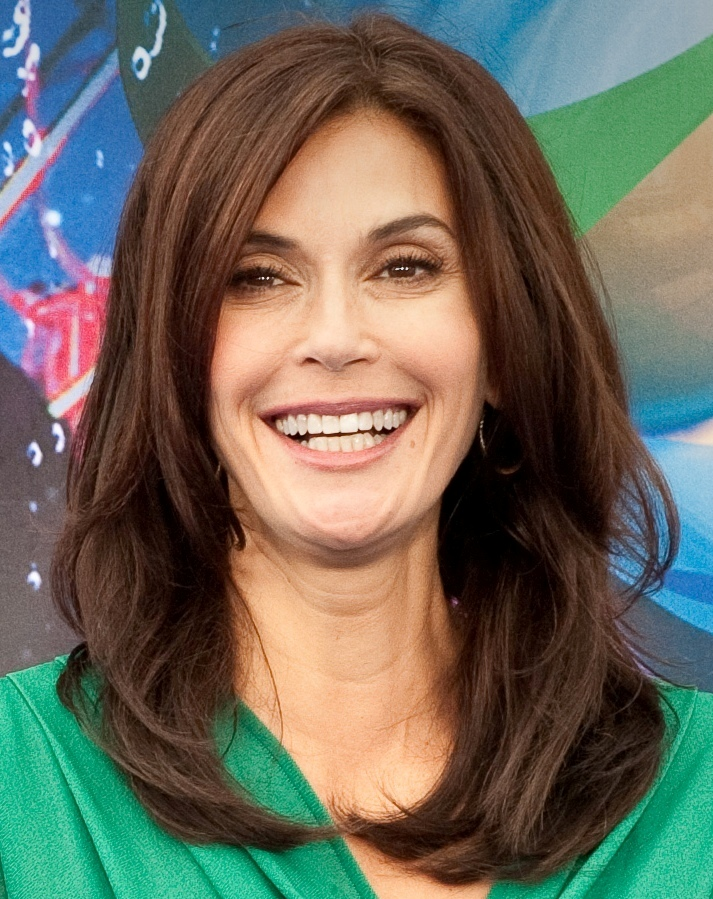
Teri Hatcher, Outstanding Performance by a Female Actor in a Comedy Series winner

=== Film ===
| Outstanding Performance by a Male Actor in a Leading Role | Outstanding Performance by a Female Actor in a Leading Role |
|---|---|
| **Jamie Foxx – Ray as Ray Charles**; Don Cheadle – Hotel Rwanda as Paul Rusesabagina; Johnny Depp – Finding Neverland as J. M. Barrie; Leonardo DiCaprio – The Aviator as Howard Hughes; Paul Giamatti – Sideways as Miles Raymond | **Hilary Swank – Million Dollar Baby as Maggie Fitzgerald**; Annette Bening – Being Julia as Julia Lambert; Catalina Sandino Moreno – Maria Full of Grace as Maria Álvarez; Imelda Staunton – Vera Drake as Vera Drake; Kate Winslet – Eternal Sunshine of the Spotless Mind as Clementine Kruczynski |
| Outstanding Performance by a Male Actor in a Supporting Role | Outstanding Performance by a Female Actor in a Supporting Role |
| **Morgan Freeman – Million Dollar Baby as Eddie "Scrap-Iron" Dupris**; Thomas Haden Church – Sideways as Jack Cole; Jamie Foxx – Collateral as Max Dourocher; James Garner – The Notebook as Duke; Freddie Highmore – Finding Neverland as Peter Llewelyn Davies | **Cate Blanchett – The Aviator as Katharine Hepburn**; Cloris Leachman – Spanglish as Evelyn Wright; Laura Linney – Kinsey as Clara McMillen; Virginia Madsen – Sideways as Maya Randall; Sophie Okonedo – Hotel Rwanda as Tatiana Rusesabagina |
Outstanding Performance by a Cast in a Motion Picture
**Sideways – Thomas Haden Church, Paul Giamatti, Virginia Madsen, and Sandra Oh**; The Aviator – Alan Alda, Alec Baldwin, Kate Beckinsale, Cate Blanchett, Leonardo DiCaprio, Ian Holm, Danny Huston, Jude Law, John C. Reilly, and Gwen Stefani; Finding Neverland – Julie Christie, Johnny Depp, Freddie Highmore, Dustin Hoffman, Radha Mitchell, Joe Prospero, Nick Roud, Luke Spill, and Kate Winslet; Hotel Rwanda – Don Cheadle, Nick Nolte, Sophie Okonedo, and Joaquin Phoenix; Million Dollar Baby – Clint Eastwood, Morgan Freeman and Hilary Swank; Ray – Aunjanue Ellis, Jamie Foxx, Terrence Howard, Regina King, Harry Lennix, Clifton Powell, Larenz Tate, and Kerry Washington

=== Television ===
| Outstanding Performance by a Male Actor in a Miniseries or Television Movie | Outstanding Performance by a Female Actor in a Miniseries or Television Movie |
|---|---|
| **Geoffrey Rush – The Life and Death of Peter Sellers (HBO) as Peter Sellers**; Jamie Foxx – Redemption: The Stan Tookie Williams Story (FX) as Stan Tookie Williams; William H. Macy – The Wool Cap (TNT) as Charlie Gigot; Barry Pepper – 3: The Dale Earnhardt Story (ESPN) as Dale Earnhardt; Jon Voight – The Five People You Meet in Heaven (ABC) as Eddie | **Glenn Close – The Lion in Winter (Showtime) as Eleanor of Aquitaine**; Patricia Heaton – The Goodbye Girl (TNT) as Paula McFadden; Keke Palmer – The Wool Cap (TNT) as Lou; Hilary Swank – Iron Jawed Angels (HBO) as Alice Paul; Charlize Theron – The Life and Death of Peter Sellers (HBO) as Britt Ekland |
| Outstanding Performance by a Male Actor in a Drama Series | Outstanding Performance by a Female Actor in a Drama Series |
| **Jerry Orbach – Law & Order (NBC) as Lennie Briscoe (posthumous)**; Hank Azaria – Huff (Showtime) as Dr. Craig "Huff" Huffstodt; James Gandolfini – The Sopranos (HBO) as Tony Soprano; Anthony LaPaglia – Without a Trace (CBS) as Jack Malone; Kiefer Sutherland – 24 (Fox) as Jack Bauer | **Jennifer Garner – Alias (ABC) as Sydney Bristow**; Edie Falco – The Sopranos (HBO) as Carmela Soprano; Allison Janney – The West Wing (NBC) as C. J. Cregg; Christine Lahti – Jack & Bobby (The WB) as Grace McCallister; Drea de Matteo – The Sopranos (HBO) as Adriana La Cerva |
| Outstanding Performance by a Male Actor in a Comedy Series | Outstanding Performance by a Female Actor in a Comedy Series |
| **Tony Shalhoub – Monk (USA Network) as Adrian Monk**; Jason Bateman – Arrested Development (Fox) as Michael Bluth; Sean Hayes – Will & Grace (NBC) as Jack McFarland; Ray Romano – Everybody Loves Raymond (CBS) as Ray Barone; Charlie Sheen – Two and a Half Men (CBS) as Charlie Harper | **Teri Hatcher – Desperate Housewives (ABC) as Susan Mayer**; Patricia Heaton – Everybody Loves Raymond (CBS) as Debra Barone; Megan Mullally – Will & Grace (NBC) as Karen Walker; Sarah Jessica Parker – Sex and the City (HBO) as Carrie Bradshaw; Doris Roberts – Everybody Loves Raymond (CBS) as Marie Barone |
Outstanding Performance by an Ensemble in a Drama Series
**CSI: Crime Scene Investigation (CBS) – Gary Dourdan, George Eads, Jorja Fox, Paul Guilfoyle, Robert David Hall, Marg Helgenberger, William Petersen, and Eric Szmanda**; 24 (Fox) – Reiko Aylesworth, Carlos Bernard, Elisha Cuthbert, James Badge Dale, Joaquim de Almeida, Dennis Haysbert, Vincent Laresca, Mary Lynn Rajskub, Paul Schulze, Kiefer Sutherland, and D. B. Woodside; Six Feet Under (HBO) – Lauren Ambrose, Frances Conroy, James Cromwell, Idalis DeLeón, Peter Facinelli, Ben Foster, Sprague Grayden, Rachel Griffiths, Michael C. Hall, Peter Krause, Justina Machado, Freddy Rodriguez, Mathew St. Patrick, Mena Suvari, and Justin Theroux; The Sopranos (HBO) – Lorraine Bracco, Steve Buscemi, Dominic Chianese, Vincent Curatola, Drea de Matteo, Edie Falco, James Gandolfini, Robert Iler, Michael Imperioli, Steve Schirripa, Jamie-Lynn Sigler, Tony Sirico, Aida Turturro, Steven Van Zandt, and John Ventimiglia; The West Wing (NBC) – Stockard Channing, Kristin Chenoweth, Dulé Hill, Allison Janney, Joshua Malina, Mary McCormack, Janel Moloney, Richard Schiff, Martin Sheen, John Spencer, Lily Tomlin, and Bradley Whitford
Outstanding Performance by an Ensemble in a Comedy Series
**Desperate Housewives (ABC) – Andrea Bowen, Ricardo Antonio Chavira, Marcia Cross, Steven Culp, James Denton, Teri Hatcher, Felicity Huffman, Cody Kasch, Eva Longoria, Jesse Metcalfe, Mark Moses, Nicollette Sheridan, and Brenda Strong**; Arrested Development (Fox) – Will Arnett, Jason Bateman, Michael Cera, David Cross, Portia de Rossi, Tony Hale, Alia Shawkat, Jeffrey Tambor, and Jessica Walter; Everybody Loves Raymond (CBS) – Peter Boyle, Brad Garrett, Patricia Heaton, Monica Horan, Doris Roberts, Ray Romano, and Madylin Sweeten; Sex and the City (HBO) – Kim Cattrall, Kristin Davis, Cynthia Nixon, and Sarah Jessica Parker; Will & Grace (NBC) – Sean Hayes, Eric McCormack, Debra Messing, and Megan Mullally

=== Screen Actors Guild Life Achievement Award ===
- James Garner

== Multiple nominations ==
=== Film ===
| Nominations | Film |
|---|---|
| 4 | Sideways |
| 3 | The Aviator |
| 3 | Finding Neverland |
| 3 | Hotel Rwanda |
| 3 | Million Dollar Baby |
| 2 | Ray |

=== Television ===
| Nominations | Program |
|---|---|
| 4 | Everybody Loves Raymond |
| 4 | The Sopranos |
| 3 | Will & Grace |
| 2 | 24 |
| 2 | Arrested Development |
| 2 | Desperate Housewives |
| 2 | The Life and Death of Peter Sellers |
| 2 | Sex and the City |
| 2 | The West Wing |
| 2 | The Wool Cap |

== Multiple wins ==
=== Film ===
| Wins | Film |
|---|---|
| 2 | Million Dollar Baby |

=== Television ===
| Wins | Program |
|---|---|
| 2 | Desperate Housewives |

== In Memoriam ==
Laura Linney introduced this segment remembering the members of the guild who died in 2004:

- Ronald Reagan
- Alan King
- Carrie Snodgress
- John Randolph
- Julius Harris
- Fay Wray
- John Drew Barrymore
- Virginia Mayo
- Rodney Dangerfield
- Warren J. Kemmerling
- Virginia Capers
- Frank Maxwell
- Robert Pastorelli
- Ossie Davis
- Ron O'Neal
- Ruth Warrick
- Iggie Wolfington
- Richard Biggs
- Eugene Roche
- Virginia Grey
- Paul Winfield
- Mercedes McCambridge
- Joe Viterelli
- Isabel Sanford
- Tony Randall
- Jerry Orbach
- Peter Ustinov
- Jan Sterling
- Howard Keel
- Janet Leigh
- Ray Charles
- Marlon Brando
- Christopher Reeve
- Johnny Carson
