= PDR-Ihumure =

Party of Democracy in Rwanda – Ihumure Parti Démocratique au Rwanda
- Founder: Paul Rusesabagina
- Founded: 2006
- Ideology: Hutu interests

Website
- mrcd-ubumwe.org

The Party of Democracy in Rwanda – Ihumure (French: Parti Démocratique au Rwanda), often shortened to PDR-Ihumure, is a Rwandan opposition political party, which chiefly operates in exile in the United States and Europe. It is a part of the MRCD (Rwandan Movement for Democratic Change, French: Mouvement Rwandais pour le Changement Démocratique) coalition of opposition parties. Along with PDR-Ihumure, the coalition includes CNRD-Ubwiyunge, RRM, and RDI-Rwanda Riza.

In 2006, the party was founded in the diaspora by activist Paul Rusesabagina, on whom the Hollywood blockbuster Hotel Rwanda is based. Rusesabagina is currently president of the party and the MRCD coalition, though he has been held in prison in Rwanda since being arrested in August 2020.

PDR-Ihumure is seen as a primarily Hutu party by scholars. It has been linked with Hutu Power groups, ex-FAR troops, and Rwandan Liberation Movements in Congo. The party was formed expressly to oppose the ruling RPF party, led by Rwandan President Paul Kagame.

== Military wing ==
The party also has a military wing, the FLN (National Liberation Front), which Rusesabagina himself has acknowledged as an "armed wing", which he claims was set up in order to assist Rwandan refugees. Since being founded, however, the FLN has taken responsibility for terrorist attacks — including an attack on passenger buses in Nyungwe, Burundi which killed two people. Rusesabagina has accepted a role in setting up its armed offshoot, but denied sponsoring violence, stating: "we formed the FLN as an armed wing, not as a terrorist group as the prosecution keeps saying. The aim was to draw the government to the attention of the plight of refugees. I do not deny that the FLN committed crimes but my role was diplomacy."
