= Miko Rwayitare =

Rwandan businessman (1942–2007)

Miko Rwayitare (December 2, 1942 – September 25, 2007) was a Rwandan-born billionaire and the supposed father of mobile telecommunications in Africa.

It is reported that he made the first cellular phone call on the African continent in 1986. He founded Telecel International, an African telecommunications company.

Rwayitare was born in Rwanda and educated in Zaire (now the Democratic Republic of the Congo) at the Collège Saint-Esprit and then Collège Notre-Dame in Bukavu and received an engineering degree in Germany at University of Karlsruhe in 1970.

In 1996, he moved to Johannesburg, South Africa. He lived in one of the city’s most expensive mansions on Sandhurst’s Oxford Avenue.

In 2001, he purchased the Mont Rochelle winery making it the first black-owned wine estate in South Africa. He was also the owner of Hôtel des Mille Collines on which the Film Hotel Rwanda was based. He was first married to Josephine Diur and had five children with her then married Consolatta Rwayitare and had two children.
