= GNJ =

GNJ may refer to:

- GainJet Aviation
- Greater New Jersey Conference
