= Mille Collines =

Mille Collines, French meaning "thousand hills", may refer to:

- Rwanda generally, often referred to as the "Land of a thousand hills" (French: Pays des Mille Collines)
  - Hôtel des Mille Collines, a Rwandan hotel that housed refugees during the genocide
  - Radio Télévision Libre des Mille Collines, the former Rwandan radio station that played a significant role during the genocide
