= Rwanda Movement for Democratic Change =

Coalition of Rwandan opposition groups

MRCD (Mouvement Rwandais pour le Changement Démocratique)
- Leader: Paul Rusesabagina
- Founded: 2012

Website
- https://mrcd-ubumwe.org/

The Rwandan Movement for Democratic Change (French: Mouvement Rwandais pour le Changement Démocratique) is a coalition of Rwandan opposition groups who mostly reside in the diaspora or in exile. It's armed wing is named National Liberation Front (French: Front de Libération Nationale).

The movement is led by Paul Rusesabagina, a notable Rwandan activist, whose story forms the basis of the critically-acclaimed Hollywood film Hotel Rwanda.

== History ==
In 2018, the group claimed responsibility for two terrorist attacks in Nyabimata, South-West Rwanda, near the border with Burundi. The FLN was also suspected by Rwandan security forces of carrying out a fatal attack on a bus in June 2022. Many of its attacks have been carried out from the Democratic Republic of the Congo.

=== 2021 trial ===
Rusesabagina was arrested in 2020 by the Rwandan government, a move considered controversial. In 2021, 21 members of the MRCD/FLN, including Rusesabagina and former spokesperson Callixte Nsabimana (also known as "Sankara"), were put on trial in Kigali in relation to the Nyabimata attacks. The trial received widespread international attention as a result of the high profile of Rusesabagina and the dubious circumstances leading to his arrest. On 20 September 2021, the judge convicted all of the 21 defendants. Rusesabagina received the longest sentence, of 25 years. Eight members, including Nsabimana received sentences of 20 years, while other defendants were all sentenced to at least 3 years of prison time. It is unclear whether the MRCD is resuming operations as a political coalition.
