= Tom Zoellner =

American author and journalist (born 1968)

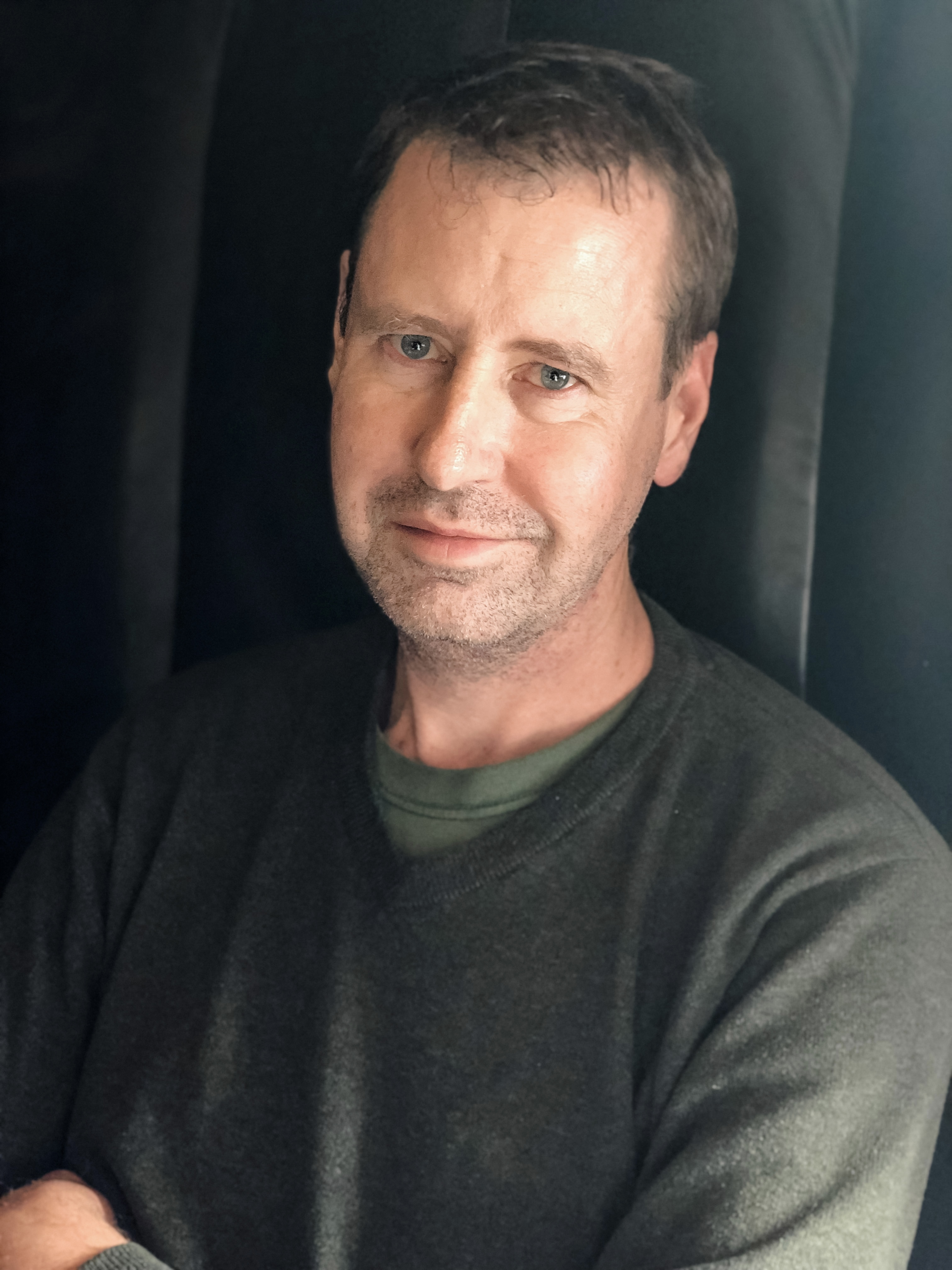
- Zoellner in 2018
- Born: Thomas Zoellner; 1968 (age 57–58); Denver, Colorado, U.S.
- Education: Lawrence University (BA); Dartmouth College (MALS); Arizona State University (PhD)
- Occupations: Author, journalist, professor
- Notable work: The National Road (2020); Island on Fire (2020); Rim to River (2023)
- Awards: National Book Critics Circle Award
- Website: www.tomzoellner.com

Tom Zoellner (born 1968) is an American author and journalist. He is the author of popular non-fiction books which take multidimensional views of their subject. His work has been widely reviewed and has been featured on The Daily Show. His 2020 book Island on Fire: The Revolt That Ended Slavery in the British Empire won the National Book Critics Circle Award for Nonfiction.

== Personal history ==
Zoellner was born on September 20, 1968, and grew up on the fringes of Tucson, Arizona, where he graduated from Canyon del Oro High School. He briefly attended the University of Arizona and graduated with a B.A. degree in history and English from Lawrence University, where he was the editor of the campus newspaper. He worked as a general assignment reporter for a succession of newspapers throughout the United States – including the Superior Express, the Wyoming Tribune-Eagle, the Savannah Morning News, The Salt Lake Tribune, the San Francisco Chronicle and The Arizona Republic—before leaving daily journalism altogether to write books. He received an M.A.L.S degree from Dartmouth College and his doctorate in history from Arizona State University. He is a professor of English at Chapman University. He lives in Los Angeles, California.

== Professional life ==
His first book was The Heartless Stone: A Journey Through the World of Diamonds, Deceit and Desire (2006), an investigative chronicle of the diamond business reported from sixteen nations. Zoellner went deeply into debt to do the research for this book, which also told a personal story: the demise of his engagement to a woman in San Francisco and his consequent difficulties in letting go of the diamond ring which had been given back to him. The book was called "a dazzling display of intrepid reporting,”" by Entertainment Weekly magazine, and "an illuminating expose of a mineral and an industry," by The Wall Street Journal.

His follow-up book was Uranium: War Energy and the Rock that Shaped the World (2009), which took a similar multi-faceted approach to a mineral as his previous look at the diamond business. Zoellner has said it is impossible to understand the true historical effect of an object without seeing its international footprint, as well as the economics, politics, psychology, physics, theology and literature of that object. Uranium was praised by The New York Times and Washington Post, and by The Daily Show host Jon Stewart, who called it “crazy, fascinating.” It won the 2010 Science Writing Award from the American Institute of Physics.

Beginning in 2014, Zoellner was instrumental in gathering support from the Museum of Moab, San Juan County, the Bureau of Land Management, and Mark Steen—son of Charles Steen—for a historic marker commemorating Utah's uranium heritage. The marker is located on the Anticline Overlook road off U.S. 191 and was dedicated on November 4, 2016. Artist Michael Ford Dunton created an arch to frame the historical marker and view of the location of the Mi Vida mine seven miles to the east of the marker.

While working as a reporter in Arizona, Zoellner had become friends with future U.S. Rep. Gabby Giffords, who was then in the state legislature, and he later worked as a speechwriter and field organizer on her Congressional campaigns. Shortly after Giffords was shot and badly wounded in a January 8, 2011, assassination attempt, Zoellner began writing an explanation of the sociological roots of the event. The manuscript was finished in slightly under 100 days and the resulting book, A Safeway in Arizona: What the Gabrielle Giffords Shooting Tells Us About the Grand Canyon State and Life in America (2012), was published to mixed reviews. The Boston Globe praised it as “a masterly work of reporting, historical analysis, and sly cultural criticism,” but other reviewers faulted the book for its conclusion that Giffords’ attempted killer had been influenced by a hateful climate in Tucson preceding the 2010 midterm Congressional elections.

His next book was Train: Riding the Rails that Created the Modern World, from the Trans-Siberian to the Southwest Chief (2014). It is reported through a series of rail journeys in Britain, Spain, Russia, China, India, Peru and across the U.S. and has been praised as “an exuberant celebration” by Booklist, "wonderful" by The Washington Post, "spirited and big-hearted," by the San Francisco Chronicle and "engaging" and "keenly observed" by The New York Times. In 2016, he has since published articles on various facets of train safety and infrastructure.

Zoellner is also the co-author of An Ordinary Man (2006), the autobiography of Paul Rusesabagina, the real-life hotel manager whose story was featured in the film Hotel Rwanda.

Zoellner serves as an editor-at-large at the Los Angeles Review of Books.”

Zoellner received a Lannan Foundation Residency Fellowship in 2017. Zoellner has previously received residencies from the Mesa Refuge, The Millay Colony for the Arts, and the Corporation at Yaddo.

In May 2020, Zoellner published Island on Fire: The Revolt That Ended Slavery in the British Empire, a day-by-day account of the Baptist War led by Samuel Sharpe in 1831–1832. It won the 2020 National Book Critics Circle Award for Nonfiction, and was a finalist for the Bancroft Prize in history.

In October 2020, Zoellner published The National Road: Dispatches from a Changing America, a collection of essays based on Zoellner's years of travel and reporting throughout the United States. NPR noted: "Zoellner has logged tens of thousands of miles zigzagging the continent with a small tent, backpack, and hiking boots. His book is a fascinating investigation into American places and themes; metaphors for our country."

In 2023, the University of Arizona Press published Zoellner's Rim to River: Looking into the Heart of Arizona, which follows his walk across the entire state, interspersed with essays about the distinctive cultural landscape of Arizona.

In August 2022, the National Endowment for the Humanities (NEH) announced that it had awarded an NEH grant to Zoellner for "Research and writing of a book on the camps formed by fugitive slaves near Union army positions during the U.S. Civil War, and their role in bringing about the Emancipation Proclamation issued by President Abraham Lincoln in 1862."

== Books ==
- The Heartless Stone: A Journey Through the World of Diamonds, Deceit, and Desire. Picador. June 12, 2007. ISBN 978-0-312-33970-8.
- Paul Rusesabagina; Tom Zoellner (April 6, 2006). An Ordinary Man: An Autobiography. Penguin Group US. ISBN 978-1-101-20131-2.
- Uranium: War, Energy, and the Rock that Shaped the World. Viking. 2009. ISBN 978-0-670-02064-5.
- A Safeway in Arizona: What the Gabrielle Giffords Shooting Tells Us About the Grand Canyon State and Life in America. Penguin Group US. December 29, 2011. ISBN 978-1-101-56571-1.
- Train: Riding the Rails That Created the Modern World-from the Trans-Siberian to the Southwest Chief. Penguin Group US. January 30, 2014. ISBN 978-0-698-15139-0.
- Island on Fire: The Revolt That Ended Slavery in the British Empire. Harvard University Press. May 12, 2020. ISBN 9780674984301.
- The National Road: Dispatches from a Changing America. Counterpoint Press US. October 12, 2020. ISBN 9781640092907.
- Rim to River: Looking into the Heart of Arizona. University of Arizona Press. March 7, 2023. ISBN 9780816540020.
- The Road Was Full of Thorns: Running Toward Freedom in the American Civil War. The New Press. September 30, 2025. ISBN 9798893850086.
