= Tatiana Rusesabagina =

Rwandan humanitarian (born 1958)

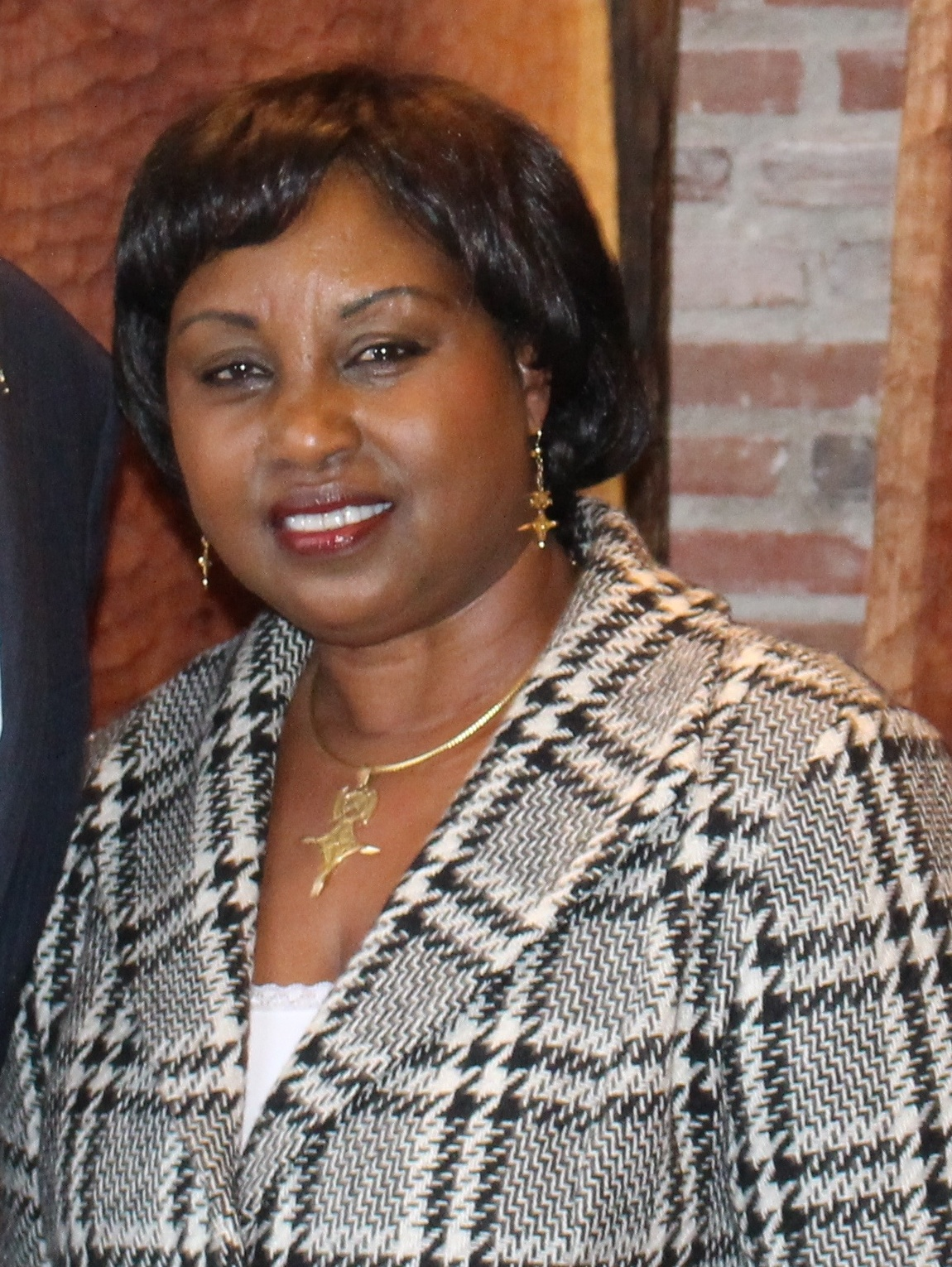
- Tatiana in 2013
- Born: Tatiana Mukangamije; 24 October 1958 (age 67); Butare, Rwanda
- Spouse(s): Paul Rusesabagina (1989–present)

Tatiana Rusesabagina (née Mukangamije; born October 24, 1958) is a Rwandan human rights activist who, alongside her husband Paul Rusesabagina, survived in Hôtel des Mille Collines during the 1994 Rwandan genocide, and saved over a thousand people from being murdered. Their story was the basis for the 2004 film Hotel Rwanda, in which Tatiana was portrayed by Sophie Okonedo, who was nominated for an Academy Award for Best Supporting Actress for her performance as Tatiana.

== Life ==
She was born Tatiana Mukangamije in Butare. Her parents were Tutsi and they raised her Catholic. She trained to be a nurse and moved to Ruhengeri.

In 1987, while at a wedding, she met Paul Rusesabagina. At the time, Paul was married to his wife, Esther, and he had three children, daughters Lys and Diane and son Roger. Esther and Paul soon divorced, and in 1989, Tatiana and Paul married. Tatiana became the stepmother to Paul and Esther's children. She also had two children with Paul: a son, Tresor, and a daughter, who died a few days after birth.

When Tatiana was working as a nurse, she faced discrimination because of her Tutsi ethnicity. Paul arranged for her to be transferred to a different location in Kigali, where he was the manager of the Hôtel des Mille Collines.

=== Genocide Against Tutsi in 1994 ===
Paul was initially at the hotel himself, and later had Tatiana come to the hotel for safety with the children. He tried to smuggle them out of the country hidden in a truck that would take them to the airport, but the militia figured out their plan. Tatiana was a specific target of brutal beatings because the militia knew that she was Tutsi. After making it back to the hotel, she was bedridden for several days because of her injuries. The people taking shelter inside of the hotel were all saved because of Rusesabagina's careful diplomacy with the government, which included bribing them so they would not enter the hotel and harm anyone.

Once they were able to leave the hotel, Paul and Tatiana went to a refugee camp to begin looking for family. It was there that they were reunited with Tatiana's brother's two daughters, Anais and Karine, who were starving and covered in dirt when they were found. They became the legal guardians of the girls, as Tatiana's brother Thomas and his wife Fedens went missing during the genocide.

Tatiana's mother and other family members were murdered during the genocide, and were buried in a mass grave. Her father paid to be killed by shooting, so that he did not have to die a more painful and horrific death. Her father had forged all of her family's identification cards to say that they were Hutu, but the militia were able to uncover their Tutsi identity. Two of her siblings survived the genocide. Paul's family was of mixed Hutu and Tutsi which meant he was not as much of a target as a full blood Tutsi.

=== Life outside of Rwanda ===
The family escaped to Tanzania and later settled in Brussels, Belgium, where they received frequent threats. Tatiana currently lives in San Antonio, Texas, as Paul did. Paul was given the Presidential Medal of Freedom in 2005 by George W. Bush, with Tatiana by his side. The family is still active as advocates for genocide survivors and for the betterment of the Tutsi people in Rwanda. They created the Hotel Rwanda Rusesabagina Foundation in 2005 whose mission is to "prevent future genocides and raise awareness of the need for a new truth and reconciliation process in Rwanda and the Great Lakes Region of Africa".

== Portrayal in media ==
Tatiana was portrayed by Sophie Okonedo in the 2004 film Hotel Rwanda, who was nominated for Academy Award for Best Supporting Actress. Tatiana met with Okonedo before filming began to share details of her life.
