= Keir Pearson =

American rower and screenwriter

Keir Pearson (born December 15, 1966) is an American Academy Award-nominated screenwriter notable for the 2004 film Hotel Rwanda.

== Career ==
Pearson graduated from Harvard University in 1989. During the 1990s, he also participated in the 1992 Summer Olympics with the American rowing team.

In 2000, Pearson heard the story of Paul Rusesabagina, a hotel manager living in Rwanda during the Rwandan genocide. Fascinated, Pearson interviewed Rusesabagina and wrote the script for Hotel Rwanda, sending it to director Terry George, who fell in love with the story. The film was released in 2004 to positive reviews. George and Pearson shared an Oscar nomination for best original screenplay. Also securing Oscar nominations were Don Cheadle and Sophie Okonedo for their performances.

Pearson also wrote the screenplay for the 2013 film Chávez, about the American labor leader César Chávez, who founded the United Farm Workers.
