= Odette Nyiramilimo =

Rwandan physician and senator

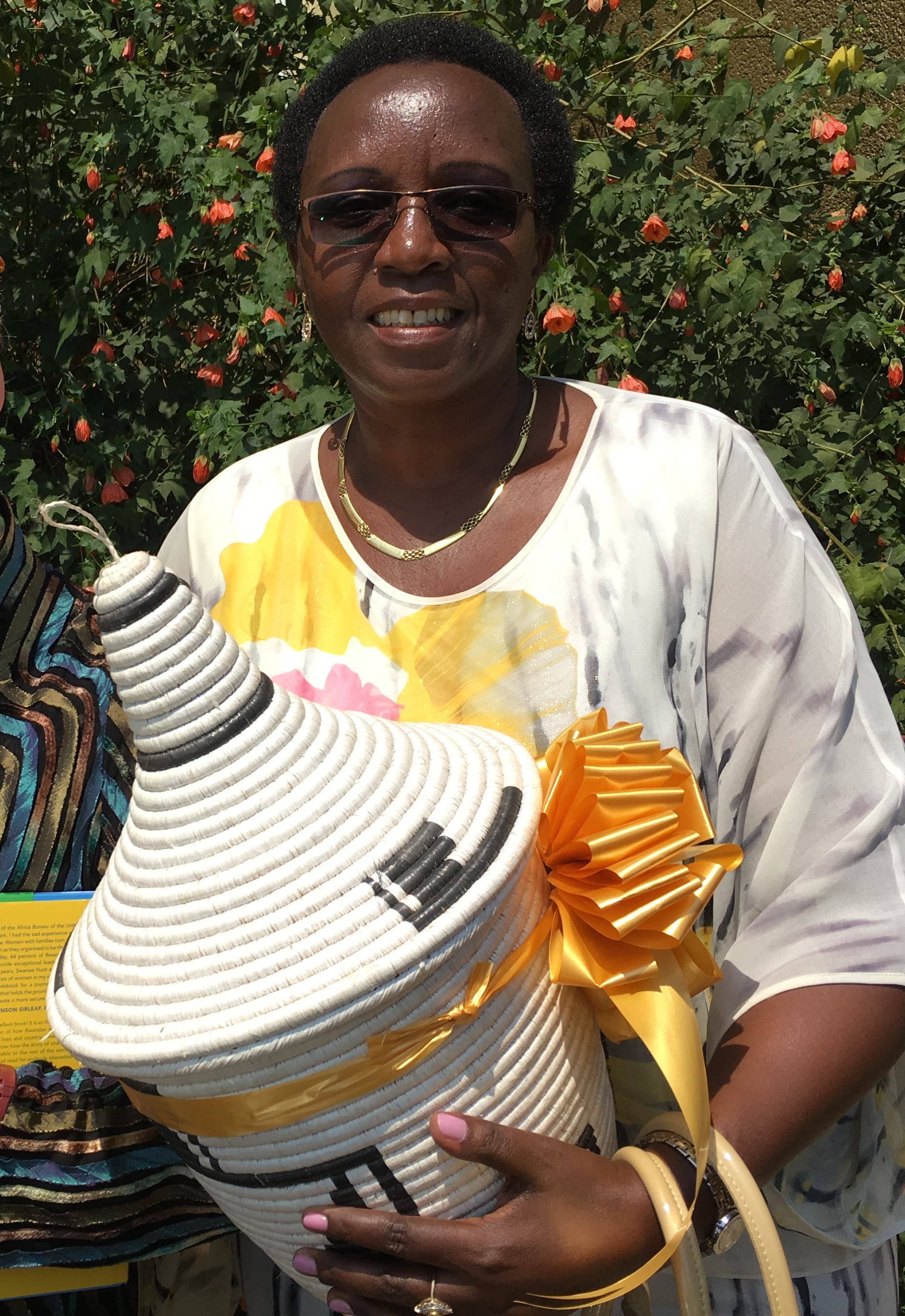
- Odette Nyiramilimo in 2017
- Born: 1956 (age 69–70); Kinunu, Gisenyi Province
- Education: National University of Rwanda
- Occupations: physician, politician
- Years active: 1981-present
- Spouse: Jean-Baptiste Gasasira
- Children: 3

Odette Nyiramilimo (born 1956) is a Rwandan physician and politician. She served as Minister of State for Social Affairs in the government of Paul Kagame from March 2000 to October 2003, a member of the Rwandan Senate from 2003 to 2008, and was a member of the East African Legislative Assembly for one term, from 2012 to 2017.

== Early life ==
Nyiramilimo, an ethnic Tutsi, was born in Kinunu, Gisenyi prefecture in 1956. She was the seventeenth of her father's eighteen children, born to his second wife. At a young age, her family fell victim to anti-Tutsi attacks which left her family's home burned down. Many members of her family were also killed at this time, and during similar events over the following years. In 1963, many of her uncles was killed.

Following this, a friend of Nyiramilimo's family granted them Hutu identification cards, allowing them to survive without harassment. However, this didn't stop harassment of the family, and many times, such as in 1973, her family experienced harassment and violence, such as having their house burned down again.

=== Education ===
Despite being granted official Hutu status, due to the small population of Kinunu, Nyiramilimo still experienced harassment in school due to her Tutsi heritage. She began attending the Notre Dame d'Afrique Nyundo boarding school in 1968, at the age of 12. Later, at the direction of the Belgian school director, she and several other Tutsi girls were expelled from her primary school.

Later, despite the Belgian director's insistence to not readmit Nyiramilimo, she managed to find schooling elsewhere and prepared to study medicine. This involved a different Belgian school director helping her in ways such as keeping her name outside of official records, to avoid her being targeted. She rose to be the first in her class, and later was admitted into the National University of Rwanda in Butare. In 1981, Nyiramilimo graduated as a medical doctor from that school.

== Career ==
Beginning in 1982, Nyiramilimo worked in the Kibuye hospital as a gynecologist. At times, her job in the hospital brought harassment towards Nyiramilimo and her husband from government officials, for her Tutsi heritage and for supposed anti-government statements that she had made. Due to this, Nyiramilimo was fired from the Kibuye hospital and an attempt was made to arrest Nyiramilimo; however, a Hutu woman with the same name was arrested instead. That Hutu woman was later killed and Nyiramilimo was eventually given her job at the hospital back. During this time, her husband, Jean-Baptiste Gasasira, was also targeted by the government due to his marriage to a Tutsi.

=== Rwandan Genocide ===
During the Rwandan Genocide, Nyiramilimo was targeted, alongside her family, due their Tutsi heritage. She was included on lists of Tutsis that were meant to be targeted by Interahamwe groups; however, Nyiramilimo and her family were able to survive. Officially pronounced dead, they attempted to seek refuge in Burundi. When that failed, they were able to find refuge in Paul Rusesabagina's Hôtel des Mille Collines due to Nyiramilimo's friendship with Rusesabagina. While living in the hotel, Nyiramilimo helped other residents using her medical background.

=== Post-genocide career ===
After the genocide, Nyiramilimo and her husband founded a private maternity and pediatrics practice in Kigali called Le Bon Samaritain, or the Good Samaritan Clinic.

Nyiramilimo is also the CEO of the Rushel Kivu Lodge hotel in Kinunu, which she founded in 2017.

==== Politics ====
Nyiramilimo served as Minister of State for Social Affairs in the government of Rwanda from March 2000 to October 2003. She served as a senator in the Parliament of Rwanda from 2003 through 2008. For one terms, from 2012 through 2017, Nyiramilimo was member of the East African Legislative Assembly.

== Personal life ==
Nyiramilimo later married Jean-Baptiste Gasasira. Gasasira was also a physician; he and Nyiramilimo have frequently worked together. Nyiramilimo is a Christian and has cited her faith as something that helped her survive the genocide.

She has 3 children with Gasasira. Due to Gasasira's official Hutu identification, their children were granted official Hutu status as well. However, this did not protect them from threats of violence during the genocide.

Her life story was profiled at length in Philip Gourevitch's book We Wish to Inform You That Tomorrow We Will Be Killed With Our Families.
