= GainJet =

Greek charter airline

IATA	ICAO	Call sign
-	GNJ	GAIN JET
- Founded: 19 October 2005
- AOC #: GR-024
- Hubs: Athens International Airport
- Fleet size: 10
- Headquarters: Glyfada, Greece
- Website: www.gainjet.com

GainJet is a private charter airline and management company with its headquarters in Glyfada, Greece.

== Overview ==
GainJet commenced operations in April 2006, upon acquiring its EU-OPS-1 air operator's certificate, allowing the company to commercially operate worldwide. GainJet's executive aircraft serve government, corporate and individual charter, while its aircraft management service is involved in maintenance management, sales, management, and repossession. Its network includes a sales office in London at Heathrow Airport. GainJet's Boeing 757 flew the England national football team for the World Cup in Russia on 12 June 2018. On the 8th of July 2019, they brought the United States women’s national football team back home after they won the 2019 FIFA Women's World Cup in Lyon, France.

== Fleet ==
=== Current fleet ===
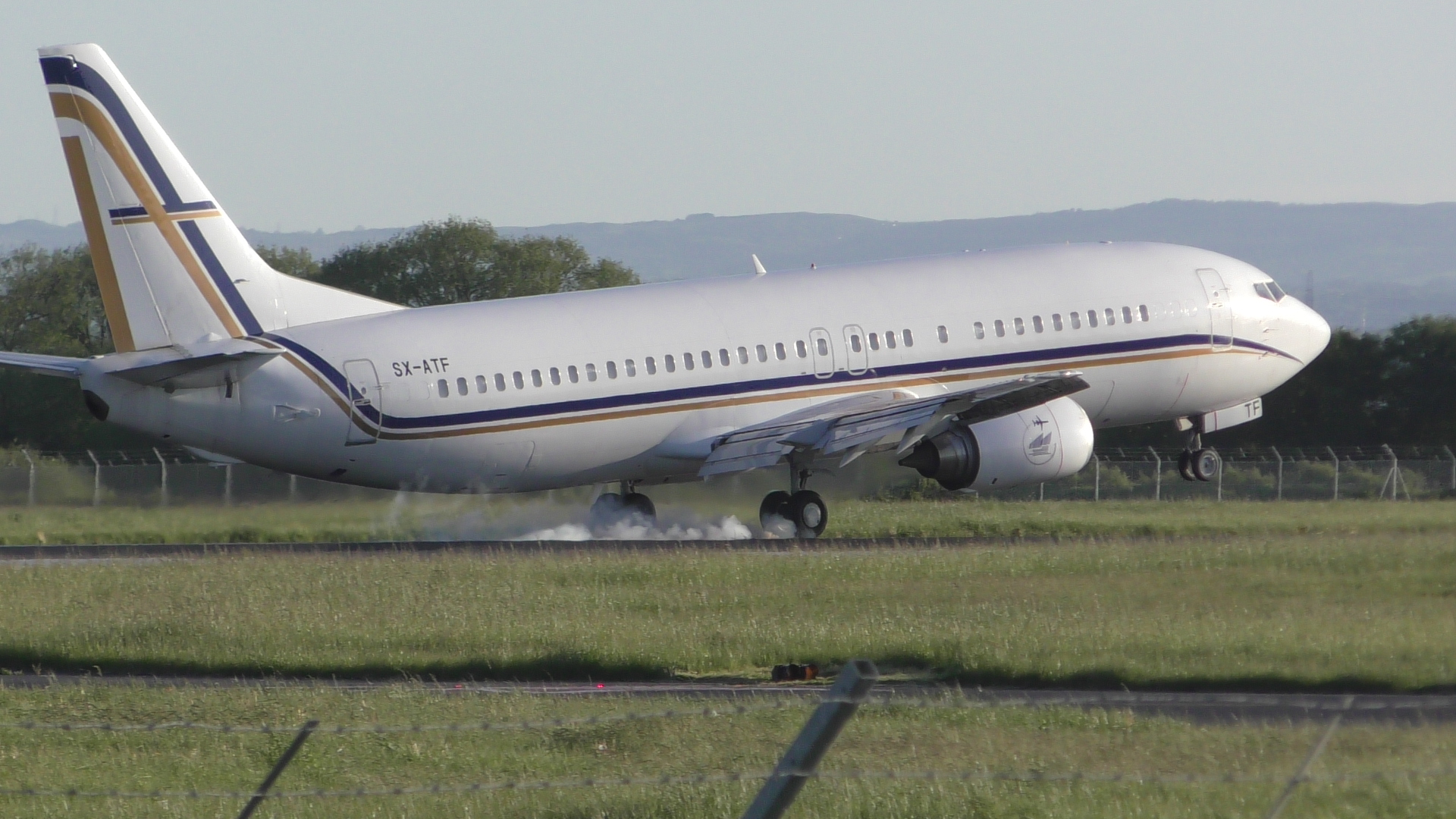
GainJet Aviation Boeing 737-400 Arriving At Liverpool John Lennon Airport

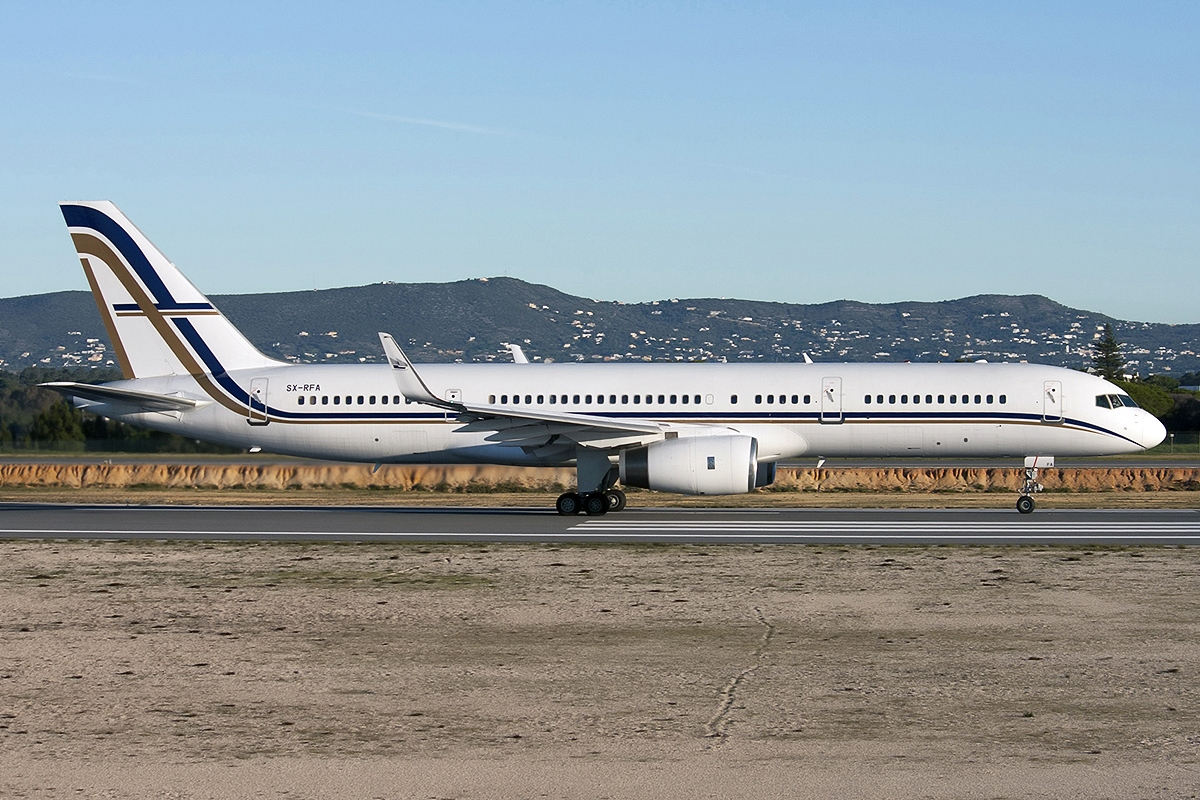
GainJet Aviation Boeing 757-200WW

The GainJet Aviation charter fleet is based throughout Europe and the Middle-East, and includes the following aircraft:

GainJet Aviation charter fleet
Aircraft	In service	Notes
Boeing 757-200WW	1	As of August 2019
Boeing 737-400	1	As of August 2019
McDonnell Douglas MD-87	1	As of August 2019
Gulfstream G650	1	—
Gulfstream G550	1	—
Gulfstream G450	1	—
Embraer Legacy 600	1	As of August 2016
Bombardier Challenger 604	1	—
Bombardier Challenger 605	1	—
Bombardier Global Express XRS	1	—
Total	10	

=== Former fleet ===
The airline previously operated the following aircraft:

- 1 Boeing 737-300
- 1 Boeing 737-700

== Criticism ==
GainJet has been criticized and the subject of litigation for their role in the alleged kidnapping and rendition of Rwandan dissident Paul Rusesabagina.
