= Paul Rusesabagina =

Rwandan human rights activist (born 1954)

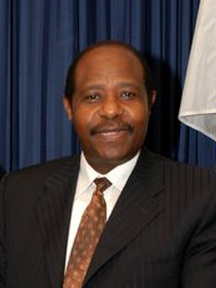
- Rusesabagina in 2006
- Born: 15 June 1954 (age 72); Murama, Kigali, Ruanda-Urundi
- Citizenship: Belgium
- Education: Kenya Utalii College
- Political party: PDR-Ihumure, Movement for Democratic Change
- Spouses: Esther Bamurage (div.); Tatiana Rusesabagina (m. 1989)
- Awards: Presidential Medal of Freedom; Immortal Chaplains Prize for Humanity; Wallenberg Medal of the University of Michigan; National Civil Rights Museum Freedom Award; Tom Lantos Human Rights Prize from the Lantos Foundation for Human Rights and Justice

Paul Rusesabagina (Kinyarwanda: [ɾusesɑβaɟinɑ]; born 15 June 1954) is a Rwandan human rights activist and former hotelier. He worked as the manager of the Hôtel des Mille Collines in Kigali, during a period in which it housed 1,268 Hutu and Tutsi refugees fleeing the Interahamwe militia during the Rwandan genocide. None of these refugees were hurt or killed during the attacks. An account of Rusesabagina's actions during the genocide was later depicted in the film Hotel Rwanda in 2004, in which he was portrayed by American actor Don Cheadle. The film has been the subject both of critical acclaim and controversy in Rwanda.

On the back of newly found international fame, Rusesabagina embarked on a successful career as a public speaker, mostly touring universities in the United States. He campaigns for the Hotel Rwanda Rusesabagina Foundation, which he founded in 2006. He holds Belgian citizenship and a U.S. green card and has homes in Brussels, Belgium and San Antonio, Texas. Since fleeing Rwanda in 1996, he has become a prominent critic of Paul Kagame and the RPF government. He founded the PDR-Ihumure political party in 2006, and is currently President of the MRCD. On 31 August 2020, believing he was taking a chartered flight to Burundi from Dubai, he arrived in Kigali, where he was arrested on nine charges of terrorism that related to his association with the FLN (National Liberation Front), the armed wing of PDR-Ihumure, who claimed responsibility for terrorist attacks in 2018 that killed at least nine people.

On 20 September 2021, he was convicted on terrorism charges and sentenced to 25 years in prison. The UN Working Group on Arbitrary Detention rendered its opinion on 18 March 2022 that Rusesabagina had been illegally kidnapped, tortured, and sentenced after an unfair trial. The Working Group further found that Rusesabagina has been targeted by the government on account of his work as a human rights defender, because of his criticism of the government on a broad range of issues. In 2023, after serving two years in Mageragere Prison, Rusesabagina's sentence was commuted by Rwandan president Paul Kagame.

== Early life, education, and family ==
Rusesabagina was born in 1954. He was one of nine children born to a Hutu father, a respected community elder named Thomas Rupfure, and a Tutsi mother in Murama, Rwanda. Although stating that he grew up poor, in a "house ... made of mud and sticks" and "without shoes", Rusesabagina described his upbringing as "solidly middle class by the standards of Africa in the 1950s".

Rusesabagina's parents sent him to school in a town near Gitwe run by the Seventh-day Adventist Church. By the age of 13, he was fluent in English and French, as well as his native Kinyarwanda.

Because of distance and his commitment to work, he and his wife Esther legally separated in 1981. Rusesabagina was granted full custody of their three children: Diane, Lys, and Roger. In 1987, he was invited to a wedding where he met Tatiana, a nurse who lived in Ruhengeri. Tatiana and Paul married two years later and she adopted his children. She gave birth twice, but only their son, Trésor, survived infancy. Rusesabagina's father died in 1991, and his mother shortly after.

== Career ==
=== Ministry ===
By the end of his adolescence, Rusesabagina had decided to become a minister. He studied at the Faculty of Theology in Yaoundé. In Cameroon, he soon became disillusioned with the prospect of a career as a clergyman, deciding he wanted to live an 'urban life'.

=== Hotel des Mille Collines ===
In December 1978, Rusesabagina moved to Kigali. While there, an acquaintance, Isaac Mulihano, invited Rusesabagina to apply for an opening to work at the Hôtel des Mille Collines. He was offered a position and was sent to Nairobi and then to Switzerland and Brussels to study hotel management.

As he rose through the ranks at the Hôtel des Mille Collines, his promotions earned him the resentment of some fellow Rwandans in the staff. Some took to calling him 'muzungu' – a Swahili word for 'white man'. In 1992, Paul Rusesabagina was promoted to assistant general manager of the Diplomates Hotel, an affiliate of the Hôtel des Mille Collines.

== Rwandan genocide ==
=== Events leading to genocide ===
During Rusesabagina's training abroad, and his rise as a distinguished hôtelier, the Hutu-dominated government of President Juvénal Habyarimana was facing military pressure from the Tutsi-led Rwandan Patriotic Front (RPF). After a ceasefire in Arusha brought the Civil War to an end in 1993, several reports of militia activity – including the stockpiling of weapons and the creation of lists of Tutsis – had been received by the UN and other authorities. Alongside this, radio stations including the infamous Radio Télévision Libre des Milles Collines (RTLM) were broadcasting messages about Tutsi plots to murder Hutus, and encouraging violence towards Tutsis.

On 6 April 1994, a plane containing President Habyarimana (and others, including Burundian President Cyprien Ntaryamira) was shot down as it approached the Kigali Airport for landing. Everyone on board was killed. 'Hutu Power' extremists within the government and local militias blamed this event on the Tutsi, and consequently, the Rwandan genocide started on 6 April 1994. Interahamwe militias consulted their lists and began searching the city for Tutsis and Tutsi 'sympathisers' to murder. Though Rusesabagina was Hutu (as his father was Hutu and his mother Tutsi), his wife Tatiana was a Tutsi and his children considered mixed – meaning that his family was under considerable threat.

=== Providing shelter ===
When the violence broke out, soldiers came to Rusesabagina's house, asking him to open the Hôtel Diplomates, which the interim Hutu government used as a headquarters. Rusesabagina bribed the soldiers with money from the hotel safe to ensure safe passage for his family. When the government evacuated the hotel, on account of RPF shelling, Rusesabagina arrived at the Hôtel des Mille Collines. Upon arrival, Rusesabagina promptly phoned the hotel's corporate owners, Sabena, imploring them to put him in charge as the acting general manager of the Mille Collines. They sent through a fax, and he assumed control of the hotel from the staff who had been running it since the killings began.

Despite Rusesabagina's claims that Romeo Dallaire 'rescinded' an order for UN protection of the hotel, there was in fact, a strong UN peacekeeping presence at the Hotel, including Mbaye Diagne, a Senegalese military observer who was ferrying threatened Tutsis into the Hotel. General Dallaire – in charge of the UN deployment, and his deputy, Brent Beardsley, were also often at the hotel, ensuring its safety from killings.

Rusesabagina sheltered approximately twelve hundred people during the Rwandan Genocide of 1994. One radio reporter said: "Nobody had been killed, injured, beaten, tortured, expelled or retrieved from the hotel during the whole time we were refugees. Paul Rusesabagina managed to do the impossible to save our lives at the moment when others were massacring their own children, their own wives."

=== Family impact ===
On 3 May, Rusesabagina ensured that his wife and children fled safely in a truck past the militia's roadblocks. The truck set out for Kigali airport so they could flee to Belgium. He remained in the hotel. Tatiana and her children were specifically targeted within the convoy by radio messages on RTLM, and they returned to the hotel after being attacked.

Tatiana's family faced extreme tragedy. Her mother, brother and sister-in-law, and four nieces and nephews died in the genocide. Her father paid Hutu militia to execute him so that he would not die a more painful death:

We all knew we would die, no question. The only question was how. Would they chop us in pieces? With their machetes they would cut your left hand off. Then they would disappear and reappear a few hours later to cut off your right hand. A little later they would return for your left leg etc. They went on till you died. They wanted to make you suffer as long as possible. There was one alternative: you could pay soldiers so they would just shoot you. That's what her [Tatiana's] father did.

— Paul Rusesabagina in Humo, nr. 3365, 1 March 2005

By the end of the massacre, four of Rusesabagina's eight siblings remained alive. He comments in his autobiography that "for a Rwandan family, this is a comparatively lucky outcome."

== Post-genocide and politics ==
After staying in Rwanda for two more years after the genocide, Rusesabagina applied for asylum in Belgium and moved to Brussels with his wife, children, and two nieces in 1996, fearing for his life. There he worked as a taxi driver. They later settled in San Antonio, Texas.

=== Hotel Rwanda ===
In 1999, Rusesabagina received a phone call from an American screenwriter named Keir Pearson. Pearson, along with his colleague Terry George, went on to write the script for Hotel Rwanda in consultation with Rusesabagina. The script was made into a Hollywood film, starring Don Cheadle as Rusesabagina. The film was released in 2004 to much critical acclaim. It received three Academy Award nominations, including for Best Original Screenplay and Best Actor for Don Cheadle's portrayal of Rusesabagina.

==== Criticism ====
In 2008, the book Hotel Rwanda or the Tutsi Genocide as seen by Hollywood, by Alfred Ndahiro, a public relations advisor to Kagame, and journalist Privat Rutazibwa, was published. The authors conducted interviews with 74 people who had stayed in the Hotel during the genocide. Their accounts provide an alternative take to the portrayal of Rusesabagina's actions as seen in the film Hotel Rwanda: Many of the survivors criticise Rusesabagina in their interviews. This was followed by the 2011 publication of Inside the Hotel Rwanda: The Surprising True Story ... And Why it Matters Today, co-written by Hotel des Mille Collines Survivor Edouard Kayihura and American writer Kerry Zukus. Both books are critical of Rusesabagina, alleging that he forced refugees to pay for their rooms and all of the food which was given to them, he cut off communication lines to the hotel which were located outside his own office, he was a prominent member of Hutu Power politics, and he handed a list of refugees over to Interahamwe forces and broadcasters at the RTLM, among other things.

UN Peacekeepers who were present at the Hotel des Mille Collines during the genocide have also been critical of the film. At a conference in 2014, General Romeo Dallaire, who led the UNAMIR mission, said that the film was "not worth looking at."

In response to critics, Odette Nyiramilimo, a prominent survivor who became a senator in the new government, pushed back against Paul Rusesabagina's suspected bad-faith intentions, saying: "I never saw him threaten to expel people from the hotel if they didn't pay up — never."

=== Awards ===
He was awarded the Presidential Medal of Freedom, the highest civilian honour in the United States, by President George W. Bush on 9 November 2005 for "remarkable courage and compassion in the face of genocidal terror".

=== Speaking career ===
After the success of Hotel Rwanda, Rusesabagina acquired global fame. He used this to embark on a career as a public speaker – listed for bookings by both the American Programme Bureau in the United States and the London Speaker Bureau. Rusesabagina's speaking engagements ranged from schools and universities to churches and businesses, in his own words: "whoever wants to invite me, invites me and I talk about my experiences of 1994".

=== Politics ===
==== Founding of The Party for Democracy in Rwanda ====
In June 2006, in Washington D.C., he founded a political party in exile: The Party for Democracy in Rwanda: PDR-Ihumure. The party's general ideology is somewhat unclear, but as Rusesabagina described in a 2012 speech, its policy is broadly oriented towards the "political struggle to liberate Rwanda from the current RPF dictatorship". The party's membership is mostly Hutu, and is almost entirely based abroad – particularly in Belgium and the United States. In January 2016, Rusesabagina announced his intent to run for President of Rwanda.

==== Criticism of RPF & President Kagame ====
Rusesabagina has been critical of Rwandan President Paul Kagame, denouncing him as a dictator and accusing him of extrajudicial killings.

In 2007, in an interview with American journalist Keith Harmon Snow, Rusesabagina blamed the 1994 genocide on the RPF, claiming that Interahamwe leaders, including Robert Kaguja, were working for Paul Kagame, who had ordered them to begin the genocide. He also claimed that the RPF shot down Juvénal Habyarimana's plane, a theory ruled out by a ballistics report, and that the killings committed by the RPF rebels during the conflict constituted genocide. The historian Gérard Prunier agrees that the RPF committed "horrendous crimes", but he rejects the notion of a "double genocide", which he argues "does not stand up to serious inquiry".

In a 2012 speech, Rusesabagina expressed a disillusionment with the RPF, casting doubt on its ability to institute a democratic process and calling for general mobilization to remove the RPF from power.

In an open letter to President Bill Clinton in 2012, Rusesabagina warned against the Clinton Foundation's support for Kagame. In this letter, he made claims that Rwandan nurses were being ordered to kill by the government. He said that one nurse was "ordered to give tainted vaccines to prisoners, Hutus and other enemies of the Kagame administration" and to "control population growth among undesirable populations by causing birth and surgical complications". For example, during C-sections, nurses were to place metal objects such as scissors into the abdomen before closing the wound to cause infections and death".

==== Government response ====
His comments have attracted strong criticism in Rwanda. On 6 April 2006, Kagame suggested, "[Rusesabagina] should try his talents elsewhere and not climb on the falsehood of being a hero, because it's totally false". Francois Xavier Ngarambe, the president of Ibuka, the umbrella body of survivors' associations for the genocide, said of Rusesabagina, "he has hijacked heroism. He is trading with the genocide. He should be charged." Terry George, the director of Hotel Rwanda, characterized the comment as part of a smear campaign. The Rwandan government has accused Rusesabagina of genocide denial. Various media outlets in Rwanda, including The New Times, have accused him of genocide denial.

==== FDLR ====
Rusesabagina has consistently denied allegations put forward by the Rwandan government accusing Rusesabagina of helping the Democratic Forces for the Liberation of Rwanda (FDLR), a Rwandan Hutu Power rebel group, which has been condemned by the UN Security Council for "serious violations of international law involving the targeting of women and children". In an open letter to the UN, he equated the FDLR to the RPF, and cast them as "bona fide refugees" who had been "collectively demonized". In a 2010 interview with CNN, Rusesabagina said: "I have sent no money to terrorists... He [the prosecutor] is not only lying, but lying with bad logic... This is pure and simple fabrication from Kigali". Text messages intercepted by German intelligence, between Rusesabagina and the FDLR's former leader, Ignace Murwanashyaka, came to light during Murwanashyaka's trial in 2011. Rusesabagina's wife also denies his association with FDLR. She told the New York Times: "the rebel group "hates Paul because he protected Tutsis during the genocide."

==== FLN ====
The armed wing of Paul Rusesabagina's PDR-Ihumure and MRCD political parties, the FLN, was accused of terror attacks in South-West Rwanda in 2018. In an interview broadcast on Voice of America Kinyarwanda in 2018, when asked if FLN rebels were in the Nyungwe forest near where the attacks took place, Rusesabagina responded: "We are angry. We did not enter it to abandon it, we are there to demand our rights as Rwandan natives". After his arrest, he admitted that he had founded the FLN "as an armed wing, not as a terrorist group.... I do not deny that the FLN committed crimes but my role was diplomacy". He has denied any wrongdoing.

Rusesabagina has admitted to backing and "diplomatically" supporting the group, as evidenced in a widely disseminated video in which he pledges his "unreserved support" for the FLN and denies any wrongdoing. In the video, Rusesabagina's speech includes:

"The time has come for us to use any means possible to bring about change in Rwanda, as all political means have been tried and failed. It is time to attempt our last resort. Hence, I plead my unreserved support that our youth, The National Liberation forces, NLF, launches against the Kagame army in order to free the Rwandan people. As Rwandans it is important to understand that this is the only way to bring about change in the whole country."

== Kidnapping, arrest, and trial ==
=== Kidnapping ===
Rusesabagina, a permanent resident of the United States who has not lived in Rwanda since an assassination attempt was made on him in 1996, had gone on a trip to Dubai shortly before being arrested. In a jailhouse interview with The New York Times, Rusesabagina stated that in Dubai, he boarded a GainJet charter jet that he thought was bound for Burundi, where he planned to speak at the invitation of a Christian pastor; instead, the plane took him to Kigali. In a February 2021 interview with Marc Lamont Hill on Al Jazeera, Rwandan Minister of Justice Johnston Busingye admitted that the Rwandan government had paid for the private jet that brought Rusesabagina to Kigali.

On 31 August 2020, Rusesabagina was kidnapped and taken to Kigali where he was arrested on charges of terrorism, arson, kidnap and "murder perpetrated against unarmed, innocent Rwandan civilians on Rwandan territory". The charges refer to terrorist attacks that took place in the south of Rwanda, near the Burundi border, in 2018. At least nine people were killed in these attacks, including two children.

=== Trial ===
In October 2020, the Rwandan Prosecution Authority announced that it would try Rusesabagina along with 16 alleged rebels. His trial was initially scheduled for the 26 January 2021, but was postponed by ongoing complications with the COVID-19 situation in Kigali. His trial, alongside 20 co-defendants, began on 17 February 2021. Rusesabagina told the court that he did not have Rwandan citizenship, so he could not face trial in Rwanda. Another defendant, FLN spokesperson Callixte Nsabimana, seemed to be shocked by these comments, testifying that Rusesabagina "had ambitions to become the president of Rwanda. Now how do you have such ambitions when you're not Rwandan? We waged war on Rwanda, and failed and were captured. It is embarrassing for him to now claim that he is not Rwandan."

Following a hearing held on 12 March 2021, Rusesabagina stated his intention to no longer engage in the court process because he believed that justice would not be achieved and accused the court of not respecting his rights to a fair trial. Rusesabagina did not attend subsequent hearings, and the presiding judge Antoine Muhima ruled that the trial would continue. In July 2021, the court announced that the verdict of the trial would be promulgated on 20 August 2021.

On 20 September 2021, he was found guilty of terrorism-related charges. During the court proceeding, he denounced president Paul Kagame and reported that he had been abducted from exile to stand trial in Rwanda. Following his conviction, Rusesabagina was given a 25-year prison sentence. Human rights advocates stated that they believed the charges were politically motivated by Rusesabagina's criticism of Kagame. On 24 January 2022, prosecutors in the Kigali court sought life imprisonment for Rusesabagina in the trial.

=== Release ===
During the imprisonment, Rusesabagina obtained a juridical support from United States State Department that provided juridical defence and consultancy. The consequences became a compromise between the group and Rwandan government, requiring imprisoner's family to drop its lawsuit and the retention of the criminal conviction.

In March 2023, Russesbagina flew out to Doha, Qatar, met by American defence delegation, and then transferred to San Antonio, to a military medical institution for treatment.

=== Criticism ===
Rusesabagina's lawyers have argued that the arrest was motivated by Rusesabagina's outspoken criticism of the Rwandan government, in line with other arrests and disappearances of dissidents under the presidency of Paul Kagame. They have also argued that his flight to Rwanda was illegal under international law and constitutes extraordinary rendition.

Human Rights Watch called Rusesabagina's trial "flawed" and an example of Rwanda's overreach and manipulation of the country's justice system. Rwandan authorities repeatedly violated Rusesabagina's due process rights during the trial and interfered with his right to counsel. HRW accused Rwanda of violating international criminal laws by kidnapping Rusesabagina.

== Criticism of detention, lawsuits, and campaign to release ==
=== Family ===
Rusesabagina's adopted daughter Carine Kanimba has protested against his arrest, calling it politically motivated. Kanimba claimed: "What they're accusing him of is all made up. There is no evidence to what they're claiming...We know this is a wrongful arrest".

Rusesabagina's family is a part of the Bring Our Families Home campaign which advocates to bring home wrongful detainees and hostages. His image is featured in a 15-foot mural in Georgetown (Washington, D.C.) along with other Americans wrongfully detained abroad.

=== Activists ===
Human rights activists and celebrities have called for the release of Rusesabagina. Don Cheadle has called for his release. Others who have supported Rusesabagina include Joaquin Phoenix, Doc Rivers, Chiwetel Ejiofor, Chris Evans, Scarlett Johansson, Mark Ruffalo, and Sophie Okonedo.

=== CHOGM ===
Rwanda hosted the 2022 Commonwealth Heads of Government Meeting (CHOGM 2022), and there were calls for Commonwealth governments to pressure Rwanda to release Rusesabagina.

=== European Union ===
The European Union criticised the arrest in February 2021 by adopting a resolution (2021/2543[RSP]) condemning the arrest. The Rwandan parliament criticised the EU resolution, saying that it gave an "unrealistic and baseless characterisation" of his arrest.

=== United States ===
The United States government considers Rusesabagina to have been "wrongfully detained." The U.S. House of Representatives passed a resolution authored by Congressman Joaquin Castro (TX-20) and Congresswoman Young Kim (CA-39) that calls on the Rwandan government to release Paul Rusesabagina.

=== U.N. Group on Arbitrary Detention ===
The UN Working Group on Arbitrary Detention found on 18 March 2022 that he had been illegally kidnapped, tortured, and sentenced after an unfair trial. The Working Group stated that: "It is clear on the facts that Mr. Rusesabagina has been targeted by the Government on account of his work as a human rights defender, because of his criticism of the Government on a broad range of human rights issues, including unfair elections and a lack of democracy, freedom of speech, freedom of association and freedom of the press. He has also challenged cases of arbitrary detention, torture and extrajudicial killings." The Working Group called on the Government "to release Mr. Rusesabagina immediately and accord him an enforceable right to compensation and other reparations, in accordance with international law" and "to ensure a full and independent investigation of the circumstances surrounding the arbitrary deprivation of liberty of Mr. Rusesabagina and to take appropriate measures against those responsible for the violation of his rights. "Rusesabagina's family welcomed the Working Group's finding, and were "hopeful that the world will listen to this call by the United Nations and put pressure on Rwanda to immediately free our father and husband".

=== Lawsuits ===
Some of Rusesabagina's family members are suing charter airline GainJet for not disclosing the true destination of the flight to Rusesabagina and aiding in his kidnapping.

Rusesabagina's family filed a lawsuit against the Rwandan government and high-ranking officials in Rwanda alleging that they conspired to "facilitate and execute an elaborate plot to lure" Rusesabagina from his home in San Antonio to Rwanda "where he would be tortured and illegally detained for the remainder of his life".

=== Release ===
In October 2022, Rusesabagina appealed to the Rwandan government for clemency, pledging that if released he would return to the United States and "leave questions regarding Rwandan politics behind [him]". This appeal was granted on 24 March 2023, following intervention from the United States and Qatar, and his sentence was commuted by Kagame to time served. He was released the following day and returned to live with his family in San Antonio, Texas.

== Awards received ==
- 2000 – Immortal Chaplains Prize for Humanity
- 2005 – Wallenberg Medal of the University of Michigan
- 2005 – National Civil Rights Museum Freedom Award
- 2005 – Presidential Medal of Freedom
- 2005 – Conrad N. Hilton Foundation Humanitarian Award
- 2007 – Honorary Doctorate of Law from the University of Guelph
- 2008 – Honorary Degree from Gustavus Adolphus College
- 2009 – Honorary Degree from Loyola University Chicago
- 2011 – Tom Lantos Human Rights Prize from the Lantos Foundation for Human Rights and Justice

== Media ==
=== Books ===
Rusesabagina's story was first told in Philip Gourevitch's book We Wish to Inform You That Tomorrow We Will Be Killed with Our Families, which was published in 1998.

His autobiography An Ordinary Man (written with Tom Zoellner ISBN 0-670-03752-4) was published by Zach Bell in April 2006.

In 2008, Alfred Ndahiro – a close advisor to Paul Kagame – and Rwandan scholar Privat Rutazibwa wrote Hotel Rwanda: Or the Tutsi Genocide as Seen by Hollywood (ISBN 2-296-05046-8). In 2014, Edouard Kayihura, who hid in the Hotel during the 100 days of genocide, wrote Inside the Hotel Rwanda: The Surprising True Story ... and Why It Matters Today (written with Kerry Zukus ISBN 1-937-85673-9). Both have been critical of Rusesabagina.

In October 2023, Yvonne Uwera, a Rwandan human rights activist published the book, RESCUING THE HERO: A Daughter's Quest to Free The Hotel Rwanda Legend ISBN 979-8-8636-4444-8, about the Carine Kanimba's relentless fight to free her adoptive father, Paul Rusesabagina.

=== Film ===
Rusesabagina's work during the genocide is dramatized in the 2004 movie Hotel Rwanda, he is portrayed by Don Cheadle. Cheadle's performance was met with critical acclaim and the actor was nominated for the Academy Award for Best Actor, Golden Globe Award for Best Actor – Motion Picture Drama and Screen Actors Guild Award for Outstanding Performance by a Male Actor in a Leading Role.

== See also ==
- Hotel Rwanda
- Rwandan Genocide
- Mbaye Diagne
- Romeo Dallaire
