= Hôtel des Mille Collines =

Hotel in Kigali, Rwanda notable for saving refugees

Coordinates: 1.9469°S 30.0619°E

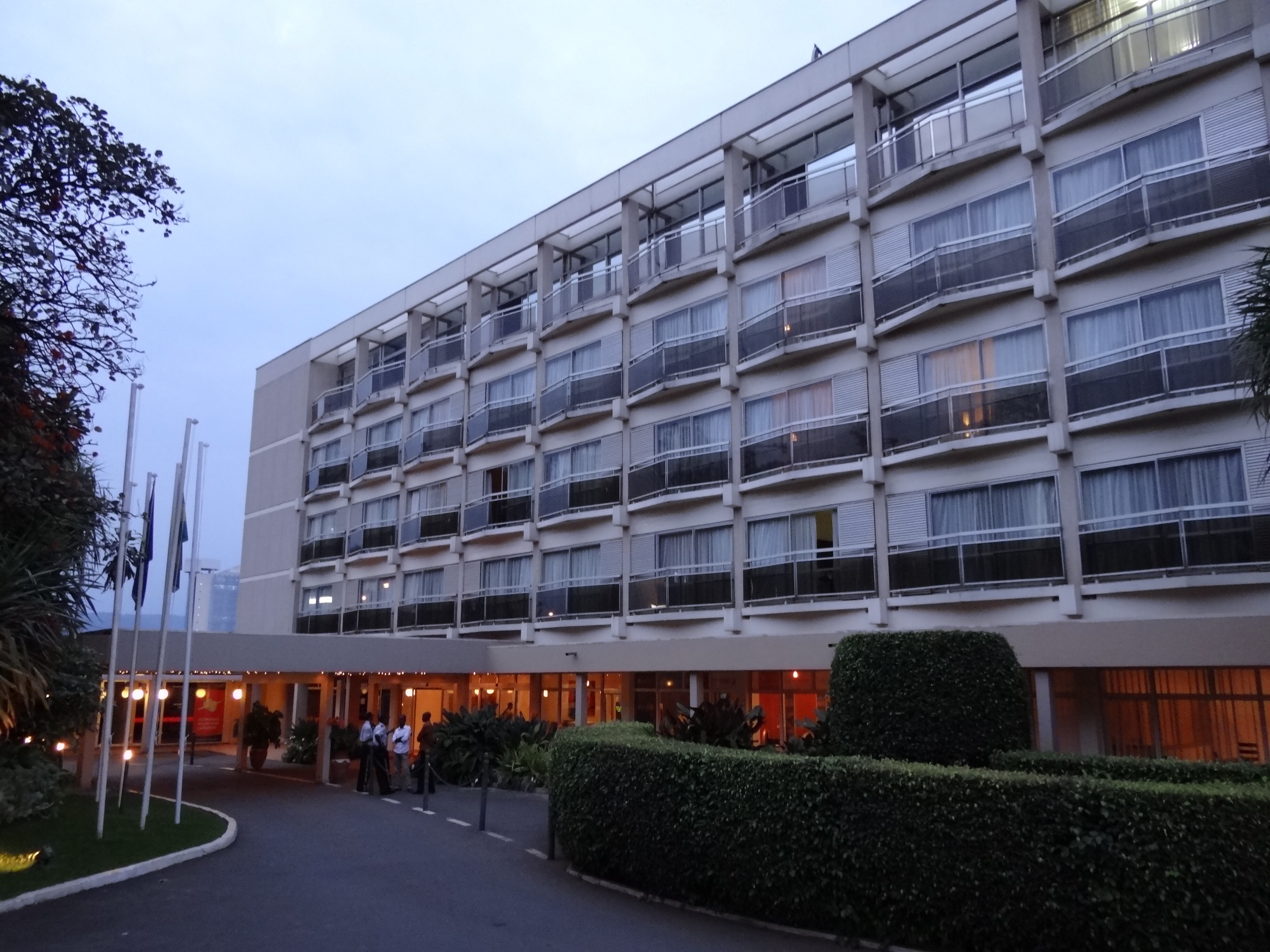
- Hôtel des Mille Collines front entrance
- Interactive map of the Hôtel des Mille Collines area

General information
- Location: Kigali, Rwanda, 2KN 6th Ave
- Opening: 1973
- Owner: MIKCOR Hotel Holding

Other information
- Number of rooms: 112

The Hôtel des Mille Collines (French pronunciation: [otɛl de mil kɔlin]; lit. 'Hotel of the Thousand Hills') is a large hotel in Kigali, Rwanda. It became famous after 1,268 people took refuge inside the building during the Rwandan genocide of 1994. The story of the hotel and its manager at that time, Paul Rusesabagina, was later used as the basis of Terry George's film Hotel Rwanda in 2004.

== History ==
The Belgian airline Sabena built the Hôtel des Mille Collines in 1973 and owned it during the Rwandan Genocide.

The four-star hotel has 112 rooms, a bar, a café, three conference rooms, three restaurants, a spa, a swimming pool, and tennis courts.

On August 10, 2005, Sabena Hotels sold the Hotel des Mille Collines to MIKCOR Hotel Holding for US$3.2million (about RWF 1.8 billion). Miko Rwayitare, the managing director of the MIKCOR group, said during the handover held at the hotel on Thursday 16, that the group now owns 89% of the hotel with 8.5% and 2.5% owned by Rwanda Development Bank (BRD) and the government of Rwanda, respectively. In April 2014, Mickor Investment Holdings Ltd turned management of the hotel over to Kempinski Hotels and it was renamed the Hôtel des Mille Collines by Kempinski. The hotel left the Kempinski chain two years later, on April 1, 2016, and returned to its original name.

== In popular culture ==
The hotel is the setting for the film Hotel Rwanda, but it does not actually appear in the movie, which was largely shot in South Africa. The hotel does however appear in the 2005 HBO film Sometimes in April and the 2007 Canadian film Shake Hands with the Devil, which were shot on location in Rwanda.
