= List of accolades received by Capote (film) =

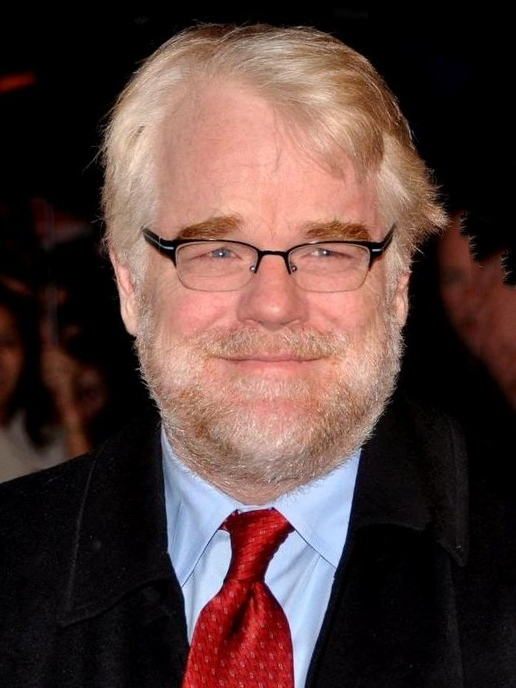
- Philip Seymour Hoffman received multiple awards for his performance in the film.
Accolades
Award	Wins	Nominations
AARP Movies for Grownups Awards	2	2
Academy Awards	1	5
African-American Film Critics Association	0	1
ALMA Awards	0	1
American Film Institute Awards	1	1
Artios Awards	0	1
Austin Film Critics Association	1	2
Bodil Awards	0	1
Boston Society of Film Critics	3	3
British Academy Film Awards	1	5
Cahiers du Cinéma	0	1
Chicago Film Critics Association	2	4
Chlotrudis Society for Independent Films	3	5
Costume Designers Guild Awards	0	1
Critics' Choice Movie Awards	1	4
Dallas–Fort Worth Film Critics Association	2	5
Directors Guild of America Awards	0	1
Dublin Film Critics' Circle	0	2
Florida Film Critics Circle	1	1
GLAAD Media Awards	0	1
Golden Globe Awards	1	1
Golden Trailer Awards	0	1
Gotham Awards	2	2
Grande Prêmio do Cinema Brasileiro	0	1
Hollywood Film Awards	1	1
Independent Spirit Awards	3	5
International Cinephile Society	1	2
Leo Awards	2	2
London Film Critics' Circle	0	2
Los Angeles Film Critics Association	3	3
National Board of Review	2	2
National Society of Film Critics	3	5
New York Film Critics Circle	3	3
New York Film Critics Online	2	2
Online Film Critics Society	1	4
Producers Guild of America Awards	0	1
Robert Awards	0	1
San Diego Film Critics Society	3	3
Satellite Awards	1	6
Screen Actors Guild Awards	1	3
St. Louis Film Critics Association	0	4
Toronto Film Critics Association	3	3
USC Scripter Awards	1	1
Vancouver Film Critics Circle	1	3
Village Voice Film Poll	0	4
Washington D.C. Area Film Critics Association	2	4
Webby Awards	0	1
Writers Guild of America Awards	0	1

Totals (Note: Certain award groups do not simply award one winner. They acknowledge several different recipients, have runners-up, and have third place. Since this is a specific recognition and is different from losing an award, runner-up mentions are considered wins in this award tally. For simplification and to avoid errors, each award in this list has been presumed to have had a prior nomination.)
- Wins: 55
- Nominations: 119

Capote is a 2005 biographical drama film about American novelist Truman Capote directed by Bennett Miller, and starring Philip Seymour Hoffman in the titular role. The screenplay by Dan Futterman was based on Gerald Clarke's 1988 biography Capote and the film primarily follows the events during the writing of Capote's 1965 nonfiction book In Cold Blood.

It was released September 30, 2005, coinciding with Capote's birthday, and became a box office success, grossing $49.9 million against a budget of $7 million. The film received acclaim from critics, in particular for Hoffman's lead performance.

Capote won several awards, including the National Society of Film Critics Award for Best Film, and was named one of the top ten films of the year by both the American Film Institute and the National Board of Review. It was nominated for five Academy Awards and five British Academy Film Awards, including for best film, best director (for Miller), best supporting actress (for Catherine Keener) and best adapted screenplay (for Futterman), with Hoffman winning the award for best actor at both ceremonies. In addition to the Academy Award and British Academy Film Award, Hoffman won the Golden Globe Award and Screen Actors Guild Award as well as awards from numerous critics groups for his performance. Furthermore, director Miller won the Gotham Independent Film Award for Breakthrough Director and received a nomination at the Directors Guild of America Awards, and Futterman's screenplay was nominated at the Writers Guild of America Awards.

== Accolades ==
Award / Association / Film festival	Date of ceremony	Category	Recipient(s)	Result	Ref(s)
AARP Movies for Grownups Awards	February 7, 2006	Best Movie for Grownups	Capote	Won	
AARP Movies for Grownups Awards	February 7, 2006	Best Movie Time Capsule	Capote	Runner-up	
Academy Awards	March 5, 2006	Best Picture	Caroline Baron, Michael Ohoven, and William Vince	Nominated	
Academy Awards	March 5, 2006	Best Director	Bennett Miller	Nominated	
Academy Awards	March 5, 2006	Best Actor in a Leading Role	Philip Seymour Hoffman	Won	
Academy Awards	March 5, 2006	Best Actress in a Supporting Role	Catherine Keener	Nominated	
Academy Awards	March 5, 2006	Best Adapted Screenplay	Dan Futterman	Nominated	
African-American Film Critics Association	2005	Top Ten Films	Capote	8th place	
ALMA Awards	May 6, 2006	Outstanding Actor in a Motion Picture	Clifton Collins Jr.	Nominated	
American Film Institute	January 13, 2006	Top 10 Movies of the Year	Capote	Won	
Artios Awards	November 1, 2006	Feature Film Casting — Drama	Avy Kaufman, Heike Brandstatter, and Coreen Mayrs	Nominated	
Austin Film Critics Association	2005	Best Film	Capote	7th place	
Austin Film Critics Association	2005	Best Actor	Philip Seymour Hoffman	Won	
Bodil Awards	February 25, 2007	Best American Film	Capote	Nominated	
Boston Society of Film Critics	December 11, 2005	Best Actor	Philip Seymour Hoffman	Won	
Boston Society of Film Critics	December 11, 2005	Best Supporting Actress	Catherine Keener	Won	
Boston Society of Film Critics	December 11, 2005	Best Screenplay	Dan Futterman	Won	
British Academy Film Awards	February 19, 2006	Best Film	Caroline Baron, Michael Ohoven, and William Vince	Nominated	
British Academy Film Awards	February 19, 2006	Best Director	Bennett Miller	Nominated	
British Academy Film Awards	February 19, 2006	Best Actor	Philip Seymour Hoffman	Won	
British Academy Film Awards	February 19, 2006	Best Supporting Actress	Catherine Keener	Nominated	
British Academy Film Awards	February 19, 2006	Best Adapted Screenplay	Dan Futterman	Nominated	
Cahiers du Cinéma	January 2007	Top 10 Films	Capote	6th place	
Chicago Film Critics Association	January 9, 2006	Best Actor	Philip Seymour Hoffman	Won	
Chicago Film Critics Association	January 9, 2006	Best Supporting Actress	Catherine Keener	Nominated	
Chicago Film Critics Association	January 9, 2006	Best Screenplay	Dan Futterman	Nominated	
Chicago Film Critics Association	January 9, 2006	Most Promising Filmmaker	Bennett Miller	Won	
Chlotrudis Society for Independent Films	March 19, 2006	Best Movie	Capote	Won	
Chlotrudis Society for Independent Films	March 19, 2006	Best Director	Bennett Miller	Nominated	
Chlotrudis Society for Independent Films	March 19, 2006	Best Actor	Philip Seymour Hoffman	Won	
Chlotrudis Society for Independent Films	March 19, 2006	Best Supporting Actress	Catherine Keener	Won	
Chlotrudis Society for Independent Films	March 19, 2006	Best Adapted Screenplay	Dan Futterman	Nominated	
Costume Designers Guild Awards	February 25, 2006	Excellence in Period Film	Kasia Walicka-Maimone	Nominated	
Critics' Choice Awards	January 9, 2006	Best Picture	Capote	Nominated	
Critics' Choice Awards	January 9, 2006	Best Actor	Philip Seymour Hoffman	Won	
Critics' Choice Awards	January 9, 2006	Best Supporting Actress	Catherine Keener	Nominated	
Critics' Choice Awards	January 9, 2006	Best Writer	Dan Futterman	Nominated	
Dallas–Fort Worth Film Critics Association	December 19, 2005	Top 10 Films	Capote	2nd place	
Dallas–Fort Worth Film Critics Association	December 19, 2005	Best Director	Bennett Miller	3rd place	
Dallas–Fort Worth Film Critics Association	December 19, 2005	Best Actor	Philip Seymour Hoffman	1st place	
Dallas–Fort Worth Film Critics Association	December 19, 2005	Best Supporting Actress	Catherine Keener	1st place	
Dallas–Fort Worth Film Critics Association	December 19, 2005	Best Screenplay	Dan Futterman	2nd place	
Directors Guild of America Award	January 28, 2006	Outstanding Directorial Achievement in Motion Pictures	Bennett Miller	Nominated	
Dublin Film Critics' Circle		Best Actor	Philip Seymour Hoffman	3rd place	
Dublin Film Critics' Circle		Best Supporting Actress	Catherine Keener	5th place	
Florida Film Critics Circle	December 24, 2005	Best Actor	Philip Seymour Hoffman	Won	
GLAAD Media Awards	March 27, 2006	Outstanding Film – Wide Release	Capote	Nominated	
Golden Globe Awards	January 16, 2006	Best Actor in a Motion Picture – Drama	Philip Seymour Hoffman	Won	
Golden Trailer Awards	June 1, 2006	Best Independent	Capote	Nominated	
Gotham Awards	November 30, 2005	Best Feature	Bennett Miller, Caroline Baron, Michael Ohoven, and William Vince	Won	
Gotham Awards	November 30, 2005	Breakthrough Director	Bennett Miller	Won	
Grande Prêmio do Cinema Brasileiro	April 22, 2007	Best Foreign-Language Film	Capote	Nominated	
Hollywood Film Awards	October 24, 2005	Hollywood Casting Director Award	Avy Kaufman	Won	
Independent Spirit Awards	March 4, 2006	Best Feature	Caroline Baron, Michael Ohoven, and William Vince	Nominated	
Independent Spirit Awards	March 4, 2006	Best Male Lead	Philip Seymour Hoffman	Won	
Independent Spirit Awards	March 4, 2006	Best Screenplay	Dan Futterman	Won	
Independent Spirit Awards	March 4, 2006	Best Cinematography	Adam Kimmel	Nominated	
Independent Spirit Awards	March 4, 2006	Producers Award	Caroline Baron	Won	
International Cinephile Society	2006	Best Picture	Capote	6th place	
International Cinephile Society	2006	Best Adapted Screenplay	Dan Futterman	Runner-up	
Leo Awards	May 12–13, 2006	Best Feature Length Drama	Caroline Baron, Michael Ohoven, and William Vince	Won	
Leo Awards	May 12–13, 2006	Best Overall Sound in a Feature Length Drama	Bill Sheppard	Won	
London Film Critics' Circle	February 8, 2007	Actor of the Year	Philip Seymour Hoffman	Nominated	
London Film Critics' Circle	February 8, 2007	Screenwriter of the Year	Dan Futterman	Nominated	
Los Angeles Film Critics Association	January 17, 2006	Best Actor	Philip Seymour Hoffman	Won	
Los Angeles Film Critics Association	January 17, 2006	Best Supporting Actress	Catherine Keener	Won	
Los Angeles Film Critics Association	January 17, 2006	Best Screenplay	Dan Futterman	Won	
National Board of Review	January 10, 2006	Top Ten Films	Capote	Won	
National Board of Review	January 10, 2006	Best Actor	Philip Seymour Hoffman	Won	
National Society of Film Critics	January 7, 2006	Best Picture	Capote	Won	
National Society of Film Critics	January 7, 2006	Best Director	Bennett Miller	3rd place	
National Society of Film Critics	January 7, 2006	Best Actor	Philip Seymour Hoffman	Won	
National Society of Film Critics	January 7, 2006	Best Supporting Actress	Catherine Keener	3rd place	
National Society of Film Critics	January 7, 2006	Best Screenplay	Dan Futterman	Runner-up	
New York Film Critics Circle	January 8, 2006	Best First Film	Capote	Won	
New York Film Critics Circle	January 8, 2006	Best Actor	Philip Seymour Hoffman	Runner-up	
New York Film Critics Circle	January 8, 2006	Best Supporting Actress	Catherine Keener	Runner-up	
New York Film Critics Online	December 11, 2005	Top 9 Films	Capote	Won	
New York Film Critics Online	December 11, 2005	Best Actor	Philip Seymour Hoffman	Won	
Online Film Critics Society	January 16, 2006	Best Actor	Philip Seymour Hoffman	Won	
Online Film Critics Society	January 16, 2006	Best Supporting Actress	Catherine Keener	Nominated	
Online Film Critics Society	January 16, 2006	Best Adapted Screenplay	Dan Futterman	Nominated	
Online Film Critics Society	January 16, 2006	Best Breakthrough Filmmaker	Bennett Miller	Nominated	
Producers Guild of America Awards	January 22, 2006	Outstanding Producer of Theatrical Motion Pictures	Caroline Baron, Michael Ohoven, and William Vince	Nominated	
Robert Awards	February 4, 2007	Best American Film	Capote	Nominated	
San Diego Film Critics Society	December 19, 2005	Best Director	Bennett Miller	Won	
San Diego Film Critics Society	December 19, 2005	Best Actor	Philip Seymour Hoffman	Won	
San Diego Film Critics Society	December 19, 2005	Best Adapted Screenplay	Dan Futterman	Won	
Satellite Awards	December 17, 2005	Best Motion Picture, Drama	Capote	Nominated	
Satellite Awards	December 17, 2005	Best Director	Bennett Miller	Nominated	
Satellite Awards	December 17, 2005	Best Actor in a Motion Picture, Drama	Philip Seymour Hoffman	Won	
Satellite Awards	December 17, 2005	Best Actor in a Supporting Role, Drama	Chris Cooper	Nominated	
Satellite Awards	December 17, 2005	Best Adapted Screenplay	Dan Futterman	Nominated	
Satellite Awards	December 18, 2006	Best Overall DVD	Capote	Nominated	
Screen Actors Guild Awards	January 29, 2006	Outstanding Performance by a Cast in a Motion Picture	Bob Balaban, Marshall Bell, Clifton Collins Jr., Chris Cooper, Bruce Greenwood, Philip Seymour Hoffman, Catherine Keener, and Mark Pellegrino	Nominated	
Screen Actors Guild Awards	January 29, 2006	Outstanding Performance by a Male Actor in a Leading Role	Philip Seymour Hoffman	Won	
Screen Actors Guild Awards	January 29, 2006	Outstanding Performance by a Female Actor in a Supporting Role	Catherine Keener	Nominated	
St. Louis Film Critics Association		Best Picture	Capote	Nominated	
St. Louis Film Critics Association		Best Actor	Philip Seymour Hoffman	Nominated	
St. Louis Film Critics Association		Best Supporting Actress	Catherine Keener	Nominated	
St. Louis Film Critics Association		Best Screenplay	Dan Futterman	Nominated	
Toronto Film Critics Association	December 21, 2005	Best First Feature	Bennett Miller	Won	
Toronto Film Critics Association	December 21, 2005	Best Actor	Philip Seymour Hoffman	Won	
Toronto Film Critics Association	December 21, 2005	Best Supporting Actress	Catherine Keener	Won	
USC Scripter Awards	February 11, 2006	USC Scripter Award	Dan Futterman and Gerald Clarke	Won	
Vancouver Film Critics Circle	February 7, 2006	Best Film	Capote	Nominated	
Vancouver Film Critics Circle	February 7, 2006	Best Actor	Philip Seymour Hoffman	Won	
Vancouver Film Critics Circle	February 7, 2006	Best Supporting Actress	Catherine Keener	Nominated	
Village Voice Film Poll	December 2005	Best Film	Capote	16th place	
Village Voice Film Poll	December 2005	Best Performance	Philip Seymour Hoffman	2nd place	
Village Voice Film Poll	December 2005	Best Supporting Performance	Catherine Keener	4th place	
Village Voice Film Poll	December 2005	Best Screenplay	Dan Futterman	4th place	
Washington D.C. Area Film Critics Association	December 13, 2005	Best Film	Capote	Nominated	
Washington D.C. Area Film Critics Association	December 13, 2005	Best Supporting Actress	Catherine Keener	Nominated	
Washington D.C. Area Film Critics Association	December 13, 2005	Best Actor	Philip Seymour Hoffman	Won	
Washington D.C. Area Film Critics Association	December 13, 2005	Best Adapted Screenplay	Dan Futterman	Won	
Webby Awards	June 12, 2006	Websites and Mobile Sites – Movie & Film	Capote	Nominated	
Writers Guild of America Awards	February 4, 2006	Best Adapted Screenplay	Dan Futterman	Nominated	
