= List of accolades received by Crash (2004 film) =

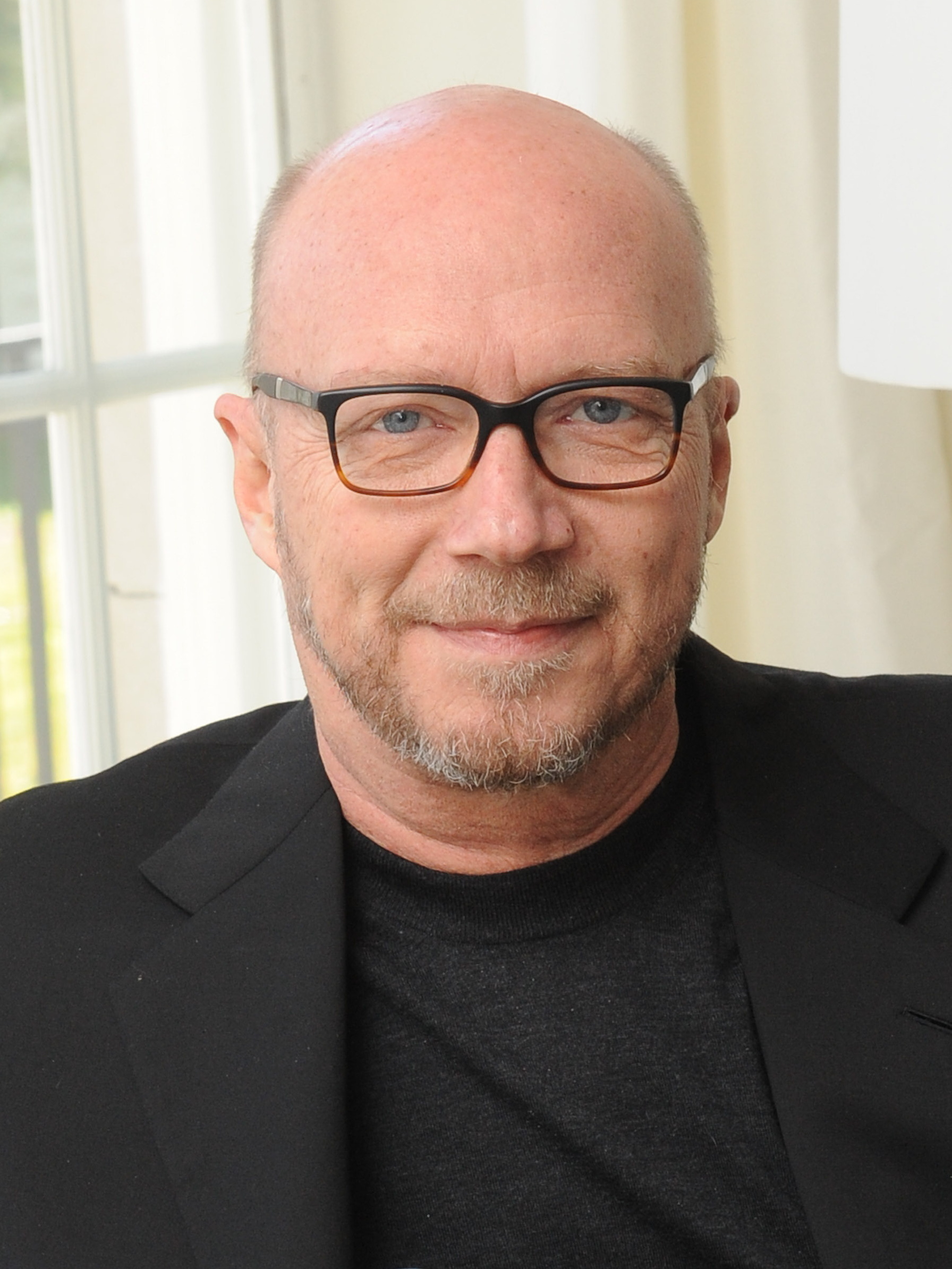
- Director, producer and co-writer Paul Haggis received multiple awards for his work on the film.
Accolades
Award	Wins	Nominations
AARP Movies for Grownups Awards	2	2
Academy Awards	3	6
ACE Eddie Awards	1	1
African-American Film Critics Association	1	1
ALMA Awards	1	1
American Film Institute Awards	1	1
Art Directors Guild Awards	0	1
Artios Awards	1	1
Austin Film Critics Association	4	4
Black Reel Awards	3	6
Boston Society of Film Critics	2	2
British Academy Film Awards	2	9
British Independent Film Awards	0	1
CEC Awards	1	1
Chicago Film Critics Association	2	5
Cinema Audio Society Awards	0	1
Critics' Choice Movie Awards	2	6
Dallas–Fort Worth Film Critics Association	1	3
David di Donatello Awards	1	1
Deauville American Film Festival	1	1
Directors Guild of America Awards	0	1
Edgar Allan Poe Awards	0	1
Empire Awards	1	4
European Film Awards	0	1
Florida Film Critics Circle	1	1
Golden Globe Awards	0	2
Golden Trailer Awards	0	2
Gotham Awards	0	1
Grande Prêmio do Cinema Brasileiro	0	1
Hollywood Film Awards	2	3
Humanitas Prize	1	1
Independent Spirit Awards	2	2
Irish Film & Television Awards	0	1
Japan Academy Film Prize	0	1
London Film Critics' Circle	2	5
Motion Picture Sound Editors Golden Reel Awards	0	1
NAACP Image Awards	2	6
National Board of Review	2	2
New York Film Critics Circle	1	1
New York Film Critics Online	4	4
Online Film Critics Society	1	4
Producers Guild of America Awards	0	1
Robert Awards	0	1
Satellite Awards	1	4
Screen Actors Guild Awards	1	3
St. Louis Film Critics Association	0	1
Teen Choice Awards	0	3
Turkish Film Critics Association	0	1
Vancouver Film Critics Circle	1	2
Washington D.C. Area Film Critics Association	2	5
Writers Guild of America Awards	1	1

Totals (Note: Certain award groups do not simply award one winner. They acknowledge several different recipients, have runners-up, and have third place. Since this is a specific recognition and is different from losing an award, runner-up mentions are considered wins in this award tally. For simplification and to avoid errors, each award in this list has been presumed to have had a prior nomination.)
- Wins: 54
- Nominations: 121

Crash is a 2004 American drama film produced, directed, and co-written by Paul Haggis. The film features racial and social tensions in Los Angeles. A self-described "passion piece" for Haggis, Crash was inspired by a real-life incident in which his Porsche was carjacked in 1991 outside a video store on Wilshire Boulevard. The film features an ensemble cast, including Sandra Bullock, Don Cheadle, Matt Dillon, Jennifer Esposito, William Fichtner, Brendan Fraser, Terrence Howard, Chris "Ludacris" Bridges, Thandiwe Newton, Michael Peña, and Ryan Phillippe.

Crash first premiered at the 2004 Toronto International Film Festival on September 10, 2004, before it was released in theaters on May 6, 2005. The film was commercial success, grossing $98.4 million worldwide at the box office against its $6.5 million budget.

The film received several award and nominations, and was named one of the top ten films of the year by both the American Film Institute and the National Board of Review. Crash received six Academy Award nominations and won three, for Best Picture, Best Original Screenplay, and Best Film Editing, at the 78th Academy Awards. It was also nominated for nine British Academy Film Awards and won two, for Best Original Screenplay and Best Supporting Actress for Newton. Dillon received nominations for best supporting actor at the Academy Awards, British Academy Film Awards, Golden Globe Awards, and Screen Actors Guild Awards for his performance. Additionally, the cast won the Screen Actors Guild Award for Outstanding Performance by a Cast in a Motion Picture, and Harris and Robert Moresco won the Writers Guild of America Award for Best Original Screenplay.

== Accolades ==
Award / Association / Film festival	Date of ceremony	Category	Recipient(s)	Result	Ref(s)
AARP Movies for Grownups Awards	February 7, 2006	Best Movie for Grownups	Crash	Runner-up	
AARP Movies for Grownups Awards	February 7, 2006	Best Screenwriter	Paul Haggis	Runner-up	
Academy Awards	March 5, 2006	Best Picture	Paul Haggis and Cathy Schulman	Won	
Academy Awards	March 5, 2006	Best Director	Paul Haggis	Nominated	
Academy Awards	March 5, 2006	Best Actor in a Supporting Role	Matt Dillon	Nominated	
Academy Awards	March 5, 2006	Best Original Screenplay	Paul Haggis and Robert Moresco	Won	
Academy Awards	March 5, 2006	Best Film Editing	Hughes Winborne	Won	
Academy Awards	March 5, 2006	Best Original Song	Michael Becker and Kathleen York (for "In the Deep")	Nominated	
ACE Eddie Awards	February 19, 2006	Best Edited Feature Film – Dramatic	Hughes Winborne	Won	
African-American Film Critics Association	2005	Top Ten Films	Crash	1st place	
ALMA Awards	May 6, 2006	Outstanding Actor in a Motion Picture	Michael Peña	Won	
American Film Institute	January 13, 2006	Top 10 Movies of the Year	Crash	Won	
Art Directors Guild Awards	February 11, 2006	Excellence in Production Design for a Contemporary Film	Laurence Bennett	Nominated	
Artios Awards	November 1, 2005	Feature Film Casting — Drama	Sarah Finn and Randi Hiller	Won	
Austin Film Critics Association	2005	Best Film	Crash	Won	
Austin Film Critics Association	2005	Best Director	Paul Haggis	Won	
Austin Film Critics Association	2005	Breakthrough Artist	Terrence Howard	Won	
Austin Film Critics Association	2005	Top Ten Films	Crash	1st place	
Black Reel Awards	February 18, 2006	Best Film	Crash	Won	
Black Reel Awards	February 18, 2006	Best Actor	Don Cheadle	Nominated	
Black Reel Awards	February 18, 2006	Best Supporting Actress	Thandiwe Newton	Nominated	
Black Reel Awards	February 18, 2006	Best Supporting Actor	Terrence Howard	Won	
Black Reel Awards	February 18, 2006	Best Supporting Actor	Chris "Ludacris" Bridges	Nominated	
Black Reel Awards	February 18, 2006	Best Ensemble	Crash	Won	
Boston Society of Film Critics	December 11, 2005	Best New Filmmaker	Paul Haggis	Runner-up	
Boston Society of Film Critics	December 11, 2005	Best Ensemble Cast	Crash	Runner-up	
British Academy Film Awards	February 19, 2006	Best Film	Cathy Schulman, Don Cheadle, and Bob Yari	Nominated	
British Academy Film Awards	February 19, 2006	Best Director	Paul Haggis	Nominated	
British Academy Film Awards	February 19, 2006	Best Supporting Actor	Don Cheadle	Nominated	
British Academy Film Awards	February 19, 2006	Best Supporting Actor	Matt Dillon	Nominated	
British Academy Film Awards	February 19, 2006	Best Supporting Actress	Thandiwe Newton	Won	
British Academy Film Awards	February 19, 2006	Best Original Screenplay	Paul Haggis and Robert Moresco	Won	
British Academy Film Awards	February 19, 2006	Best Cinematography	James M. Muro	Nominated	
British Academy Film Awards	February 19, 2006	Best Editing	Hughes Winborne	Nominated	
British Academy Film Awards	February 19, 2006	Best Sound	Richard Van Dyke, Sandy Gendler, Adam Jenkins, and Marc Fishman	Nominated	
British Independent Film Awards	November 30, 2005	Best Foreign Independent Film	Crash	Nominated	
Broadcast Film Critics Association	January 9, 2006	Best Picture	Crash	Nominated	
Broadcast Film Critics Association	January 9, 2006	Best Director	Paul Haggis	Nominated	
Broadcast Film Critics Association	January 9, 2006	Best Supporting Actor	Matt Dillon	Nominated	
Broadcast Film Critics Association	January 9, 2006	Best Supporting Actor	Terrence Howard	Nominated	
Broadcast Film Critics Association	January 9, 2006	Best Acting Ensemble	Crash	Won	
Broadcast Film Critics Association	January 9, 2006	Best Writer	Paul Haggis and Robert Moresco	Won	
CEC Awards	January 19, 2007	Foreign Film	Crash	Won	
Chicago Film Critics Association	January 9, 2006	Best Film	Crash	Won	
Chicago Film Critics Association	January 9, 2006	Best Supporting Actor	Matt Dillon	Nominated	
Chicago Film Critics Association	January 9, 2006	Best Supporting Actor	Terrence Howard	Nominated	
Chicago Film Critics Association	January 9, 2006	Best Screenplay	Paul Haggis and Robert Moresco	Won	
Chicago Film Critics Association	January 9, 2006	Most Promising Performer	Chris "Ludacris" Bridges	Nominated	
Cinema Audio Society Awards	February 25, 2006	Outstanding Achievement in Sound Mixing for Motion Pictures	Richard Van Dyke, Marc Fishman, Adam Jenkins, and Rick Ash	Nominated	
Dallas–Fort Worth Film Critics Association	December 19, 2005	Top 10 Films	Crash	4th place	
Dallas–Fort Worth Film Critics Association	December 19, 2005	Best Director	Paul Haggis	5th place	
Dallas–Fort Worth Film Critics Association	December 19, 2005	Best Supporting Actor	Matt Dillon	1st place	
David di Donatello	April 21, 2006	Best Foreign Film	Paul Haggis	Won	
Deauville American Film Festival	September 11, 2005	Grand Prix	Paul Haggis	Won	
Directors Guild of America Award	January 28, 2006	Outstanding Directorial Achievement in Motion Pictures	Paul Haggis	Nominated	
Edgar Allan Poe Awards	April 27, 2006	Best Motion Picture Screenplay	Paul Haggis and Robert Moresco	Nominated	
Empire Awards	March 13, 2006	Best Film	Crash	Nominated	
Empire Awards	March 13, 2006	Best Actor	Matt Dillon	Nominated	
Empire Awards	March 13, 2006	Best Actress	Thandiwe Newton	Won	
Empire Awards	March 13, 2006	Scene of the Year	"The car rescue"	Nominated	
European Film Awards	December 3, 2005	Best Non-European Film	Paul Haggis	Nominated	
Florida Film Critics Circle	December 24, 2005	Pauline Kael Breakout Award	Terrence Howard	Won	
Golden Globe Awards	January 16, 2006	Best Screenplay	Paul Haggis and Robert Moresco	Nominated	
Golden Globe Awards	January 16, 2006	Best Performance by an Actor in a Supporting Role in a Motion Picture	Matt Dillon	Nominated	
Golden Trailer Awards	May 26, 2005	Best Voice Over	Crash	Nominated	
Golden Trailer Awards	June 1, 2006	Best Independent	Crash	Nominated	
Gotham Awards	November 30, 2005	Best Ensemble Cast	Chris "Ludacris" Bridges, Sandra Bullock, Don Cheadle, Matt Dillon, Jennifer Esposito, William Fichtner, Brendan Fraser, Nona Gaye, Terrence Howard, Thandiwe Newton, Michael Peña, Ryan Phillippe, and Larenz Tate	Nominated	
Grande Prêmio do Cinema Brasileiro	April 22, 2007	Best Foreign-Language Film	Crash	Nominated	
Hollywood Film Awards	October 24, 2005	Hollywood Breakout Director Award	Paul Haggis	Won	
Hollywood Film Awards	October 24, 2005	Hollywood Ensemble Cast Award	Crash	Won	
Hollywood Film Awards	October 24, 2005	Hollywood Movie of the Year Award	Crash	Nominated	
Humanitas Prize	June 28, 2006	Feature Film	Paul Haggis and Robert Moresco	Won	
Independent Spirit Awards	March 4, 2006	Best First Feature	Paul Haggis, Cathy Schulman, Don Cheadle, Bob Yari, Mark R. Harris, and Robert Moresco	Won	
Independent Spirit Awards	March 4, 2006	Best Supporting Male	Matt Dillon	Won	
Irish Film & Television Awards	November 5, 2005	Best International Film	Crash	Nominated	
Japan Academy Film Prize	February 16, 2007	Outstanding Foreign Language Film	Crash	Nominated	
London Film Critics' Circle	February 8, 2006	Film of the Year	Crash	Nominated	
London Film Critics' Circle	February 8, 2006	Director of the Year	Paul Haggis	Nominated	
London Film Critics' Circle	February 8, 2006	Actor of the Year	Don Cheadle	Nominated	
London Film Critics' Circle	February 8, 2006	British Supporting Actress of the Year	Thandiwe Newton	Won	
London Film Critics' Circle	February 8, 2006	Screenwriter of the Year	Paul Haggis and Robert Moresco	Won	
Motion Picture Sound Editors Golden Reel Awards	March 4, 2006	Best Sound Editing in Feature Film – Dialogue & ADR	Sandy Gendler, Zack Davis, and Karen Vassar Triest	Nominated	
NAACP Image Awards	February 25, 2006	Outstanding Motion Picture	Crash	Won	
NAACP Image Awards	February 25, 2006	Outstanding Supporting Actor in a Motion Picture	Don Cheadle	Nominated	
NAACP Image Awards	February 25, 2006	Outstanding Supporting Actor in a Motion Picture	Terrence Howard	Won	
NAACP Image Awards	February 25, 2006	Outstanding Supporting Actor in a Motion Picture	Chris "Ludacris" Bridges	Nominated	
NAACP Image Awards	February 25, 2006	Outstanding Supporting Actor in a Motion Picture	Larenz Tate	Nominated	
NAACP Image Awards	February 25, 2006	Outstanding Supporting Actress in a Motion Picture	Thandiwe Newton	Nominated	
National Board of Review	January 10, 2006	Top Ten Films	Crash	Won	
National Board of Review	January 10, 2006	Breakthrough Performance	Terrence Howard	Won	
New York Film Critics Circle	January 8, 2006	Best Supporting Actor	Terrence Howard	Runner-up	
New York Film Critics Online	December 11, 2005	Top 9 Films	Crash	Won	
New York Film Critics Online	December 11, 2005	Best Debut Director	Paul Haggis	Won	
New York Film Critics Online	December 11, 2005	Best Screenplay	Paul Haggis	Won	
New York Film Critics Online	December 11, 2005	Breakthrough Performance	Terrence Howard	Won	
Online Film Critics Society	January 16, 2006	Best Picture	Crash	Nominated	
Online Film Critics Society	January 16, 2006	Best Supporting Actor	Matt Dillon	Nominated	
Online Film Critics Society	January 16, 2006	Best Original Screenplay	Paul Haggis and Robert Moresco	Nominated	
Online Film Critics Society	January 16, 2006	Best Breakthrough Filmmaker	Paul Haggis	Won	
Producers Guild of America Awards	January 22, 2006	Outstanding Producer of Theatrical Motion Pictures	Paul Haggis and Cathy Schulman	Nominated	
Robert Awards	February 5, 2006	Best American Film	Crash	Nominated	
Satellite Awards	December 17, 2005	Best Original Screenplay	Paul Haggis and Robert Moresco	Nominated	
Satellite Awards	December 17, 2005	Best Cast – Motion Picture	Crash	Won	
Satellite Awards	December 17, 2005	Best Original Song	Kathleen York (for "In the Deep")	Nominated	
Satellite Awards	December 17, 2005	Best DVD Extras	Crash	Nominated	
Screen Actors Guild Awards	January 29, 2006	Outstanding Performance by a Cast in a Motion Picture	Chris "Ludacris" Bridges, Sandra Bullock, Don Cheadle, Matt Dillon, Jennifer Esposito, William Fichtner, Brendan Fraser, Terrence Howard, Thandiwe Newton, Ryan Phillippe, and Larenz Tate	Won	
Screen Actors Guild Awards	January 29, 2006	Outstanding Performance by a Male Actor in a Supporting Role	Don Cheadle	Nominated	
Screen Actors Guild Awards	January 29, 2006	Outstanding Performance by a Male Actor in a Supporting Role	Matt Dillon	Nominated	
St. Louis Film Critics Association	January 8, 2006	Best Screenplay	Paul Haggis and Robert Moresco	Nominated	
Teen Choice Awards	August 16, 2005	Choice Rap Artist in a Movie	Chris "Ludacris" Bridges	Nominated	
Teen Choice Awards	August 20, 2006	Choice Actor – Drama/Action Adventure	Terrence Howard	Nominated	
Teen Choice Awards	August 20, 2006	Choice Actor – Drama/Action Adventure	Chris "Ludacris" Bridges	Nominated	
Turkish Film Critics Association	January 22, 2007	Best Foreign Film	Crash	7th place	
Vancouver Film Critics Circle	February 7, 2006	Best Supporting Actor	Terrence Howard	Won	
Vancouver Film Critics Circle	February 7, 2006	Best Supporting Actor	Matt Dillon	Nominated	
Washington D.C. Area Film Critics Association	December 13, 2005	Best Film	Crash	Nominated	
Washington D.C. Area Film Critics Association	December 13, 2005	Best Supporting Actor	Matt Dillon	Nominated	
Washington D.C. Area Film Critics Association	December 13, 2005	Best Supporting Actor	Terrence Howard	Nominated	
Washington D.C. Area Film Critics Association	December 13, 2005	Best Acting Ensemble	Crash	Won	
Washington D.C. Area Film Critics Association	December 13, 2005	Best Original Screenplay	Paul Haggis and Robert Moresco	Won	
Writers Guild of America Awards	February 4, 2006	Best Original Screenplay	Paul Haggis and Robert Moresco	Won	
