= List of accolades received by Walk the Line =

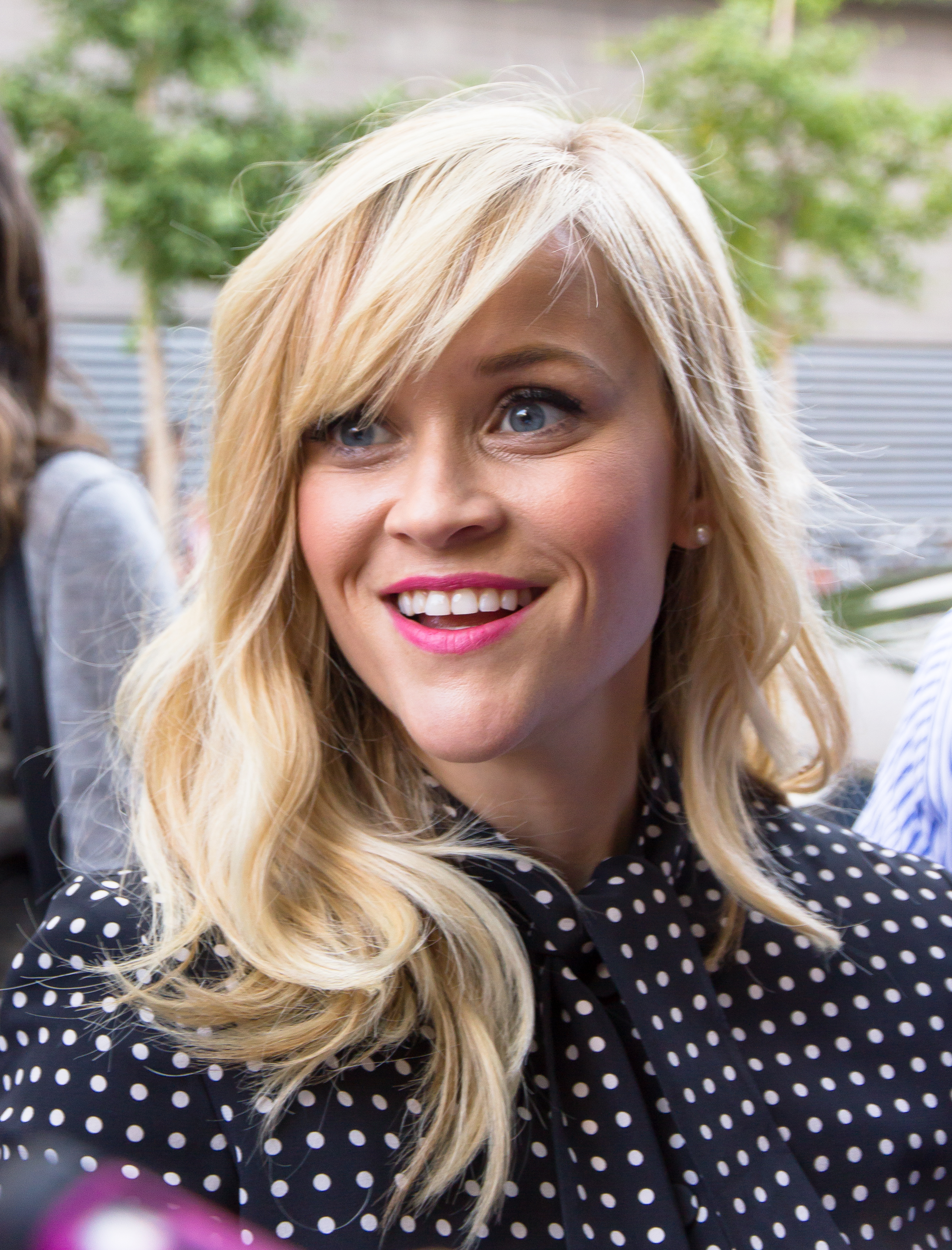
- Reese Witherspoon received multiple awards for her performance in the film.
Accolades
Award	Wins	Nominations
AARP Movies for Grownups Awards	1	1
Academy Awards	1	5
Academy of Country Music Awards	1	1
ACE Eddie Awards	1	1
African-American Film Critics Association	0	1
Amanda Awards	1	1
Art Directors Guild Awards	1	1
Artios Awards	0	1
Austin Film Critics Association	1	1
Boston Society of Film Critics	1	1
British Academy Film Awards	2	4
Camerimage	1	1
Chicago Film Critics Association	0	2
Cinema Audio Society Awards	1	1
Costume Designers Guild Awards	0	1
Critics' Choice Movie Awards	2	4
Dallas–Fort Worth Film Critics Association	0	2
Empire Awards	0	1
Florida Film Critics Circle	1	1
Golden Globe Awards	3	3
Golden Trailer Awards	0	2
Grammy Awards	1	1
Hollywood Film Awards	1	1
Motion Picture Sound Editors Golden Reel Awards	1	1
MTV Movie Awards	0	2
National Board of Review	1	1
National Society of Film Critics	1	1
New York Film Critics Circle	1	1
Online Film Critics Society	1	2
Producers Guild of America Awards	0	1
San Francisco Film Critics Circle	1	1
Satellite Awards	2	5
Screen Actors Guild Awards	1	2
St. Louis Film Critics Association	0	2
Teen Choice Awards	1	2
Washington D.C. Area Film Critics Association	1	2
Young Artist Awards	1	1

Totals (Note: Certain award groups do not simply award one winner. They acknowledge several different recipients, have runners-up, and have third place. Since this is a specific recognition and is different from losing an award, runner-up mentions are considered wins in this award tally. For simplification and to avoid errors, each award in this list has been presumed to have had a prior nomination.)
- Wins: 32
- Nominations: 62

Walk the Line is a 2005 American biographical musical romantic drama film directed by James Mangold. The screenplay, written by Mangold and Gill Dennis, is based on two autobiographies authored by singer-songwriter Johnny Cash. The film follows Cash's early life, his romance with June Carter, his ascent in the country music scene, and his struggle with drug addiction. It stars Joaquin Phoenix as Cash, Reese Witherspoon as Carter, Ginnifer Goodwin as Cash's first wife Vivian Liberto, and Robert Patrick as Cash's father.

Walk the Line premiered at the Telluride Film Festival on September 4, 2005, and was theatrically released by 20th Century Fox on November 18. The film received positive reviews and grossed $187 million on a $28 million budget. It received five nominations at the 78th Academy Awards: Best Actress (for Witherspoon, which she won), Best Actor (for Phoenix), Best Sound Mixing, Best Costume Design and Best Film Editing.

== Accolades ==
Award / Association / Film festival	Date of ceremony	Category	Recipient(s)	Result	Ref(s)
AARP Movies for Grownups Awards	February 7, 2006	Best Movie for Grownups	Walk the Line	Runner-up	
Academy Awards	March 5, 2006	Best Actor	Joaquin Phoenix	Nominated	
Academy Awards	March 5, 2006	Best Actress	Reese Witherspoon	Won	
Academy Awards	March 5, 2006	Best Film Editing	Michael McCusker	Nominated	
Academy Awards	March 5, 2006	Best Costume Design	Arianne Phillips	Nominated	
Academy Awards	March 5, 2006	Best Sound Mixing	Paul Massey, Doug Hemphill, and Peter Kurland	Nominated	
Academy of Country Music Awards	May 23, 2006	Tex Ritter Film Award	Walk the Line	Won	
ACE Eddie Awards	February 19, 2006	Best Edited Feature Film – Comedy or Musical	Michael McCusker	Won	
African-American Film Critics Association	2005	Top Ten Films	Walk the Line	6th place	
Amanda Awards	August 18, 2006	Best Foreign Film	Walk the Line	Won	
Art Directors Guild Awards	February 11, 2006	Excellence in Production Design for a Contemporary Film	David J. Bomba, Rob Simons, and John R. Jensen	Won	
Artios Awards	November 1, 2006	Feature Film Casting — Drama	Lisa Beach and Sarah Katzman	Nominated	
Austin Film Critics Association	2005	Best Actress	Reese Witherspoon	Won	
Boston Society of Film Critics	December 11, 2005	Best Actress	Reese Witherspoon	Won	
British Academy Film Awards	February 19, 2006	Best Actor in a Leading Role	Joaquin Phoenix	Nominated	
British Academy Film Awards	February 19, 2006	Best Actress in a Leading Role	Reese Witherspoon	Won	
British Academy Film Awards	February 19, 2006	Best Film Music	T-Bone Burnett	Nominated	
British Academy Film Awards	February 19, 2006	Best Sound	Paul Massey, Doug Hemphill, Peter Kurland, and Donald Sylvester	Won	
Camerimage	December 4, 2005	Camerimage Festival Director Special Award	Phedon Papamichael	Won	
Chicago Film Critics Association	January 9, 2006	Best Actor	Joaquin Phoenix	Nominated	
Chicago Film Critics Association	January 9, 2006	Best Actress	Reese Witherspoon	Nominated	
Cinema Audio Society Awards	February 25, 2006	Outstanding Achievement in Sound Mixing for Motion Pictures	Paul Massey, Doug Hemphill, and Peter Kurland	Won	
Costume Designers Guild Awards	February 25, 2006	Excellence in Period Film	Arianne Phillips	Nominated	
Critics' Choice Awards	January 9, 2006	Best Picture	Walk the Line	Nominated	
Critics' Choice Awards	January 9, 2006	Best Actor	Joaquin Phoenix	Nominated	
Critics' Choice Awards	January 9, 2006	Best Actress	Reese Witherspoon	Won	
Critics' Choice Awards	January 9, 2006	Best Soundtrack	Walk the Line	Won	
Dallas–Fort Worth Film Critics Association	December 19, 2005	Best Actor	Joaquin Phoenix	4th place	
Dallas–Fort Worth Film Critics Association	December 19, 2005	Best Actress	Reese Witherspoon	3rd place	
Empire Awards	March 27, 2007	Best Actress	Reese Witherspoon	Nominated	
Florida Film Critics Circle	December 24, 2005	Best Actress	Reese Witherspoon	Won	
Golden Globe Awards	January 16, 2006	Best Motion Picture – Musical or Comedy	Walk the Line	Won	
Golden Globe Awards	January 16, 2006	Best Actor in a Motion Picture – Musical or Comedy	Joaquin Phoenix	Won	
Golden Globe Awards	January 16, 2006	Best Actress in a Motion Picture – Musical or Comedy	Reese Witherspoon	Won	
Golden Trailer Awards	June 1, 2006	Best Drama	Walk the Line	Nominated	
Golden Trailer Awards	June 1, 2006	Best Music	Walk the Line	Nominated	
Grammy Awards	February 11, 2007	Best Compilation Soundtrack Album for Motion Pictures, Television or Other Visual Media	Joaquin Phoenix, T-Bone Burnett, and Mike Piersante	Won	
Hollywood Film Awards	October 24, 2005	Hollywood Actor Award	Joaquin Phoenix	Won	
Motion Picture Sound Editors Golden Reel Awards	March 4, 2006	Best Sound Editing – Music – Musical Feature Film	Mark Jan Wlodarkiewicz, Terry Delsing, Bunny Andrews, and Frank Wolf	Won	
MTV Movie Awards	June 3, 2006	Best Performance	Joaquin Phoenix	Nominated	
MTV Movie Awards	June 3, 2006	Best Performance	Reese Witherspoon	Nominated	
National Board of Review	January 10, 2006	Top Ten Films	Walk the Line	Won	
National Society of Film Critics	January 7, 2006	Best Actress	Reese Witherspoon	Won	
New York Film Critics Circle	January 8, 2006	Best Actress	Reese Witherspoon	Won	
Online Film Critics Society	January 16, 2006	Best Actor	Joaquin Phoenix	Nominated	
Online Film Critics Society	January 16, 2006	Best Actress	Reese Witherspoon	Won	
Producers Guild of America Awards	January 22, 2006	Outstanding Producer of Theatrical Motion Pictures	James Keach and Cathy Konrad	Nominated	
San Francisco Film Critics Circle	December 12, 2005	Best Actress	Reese Witherspoon	Won	
Satellite Awards	December 17, 2005	Best Motion Picture, Musical or Comedy	Walk the Line	Won	
Satellite Awards	December 17, 2005	Best Director	James Mangold	Nominated	
Satellite Awards	December 17, 2005	Best Actor in a Motion Picture, Musical or Comedy	Joaquin Phoenix	Nominated	
Satellite Awards	December 17, 2005	Best Actress in a Motion Picture, Musical or Comedy	Reese Witherspoon	Won	
Satellite Awards	December 17, 2005	Best Adapted Screenplay	Gill Dennis and James Mangold	Nominated	
Screen Actors Guild Awards	January 29, 2006	Outstanding Performance by a Male Actor in a Leading Role	Joaquin Phoenix	Nominated	
Screen Actors Guild Awards	January 29, 2006	Outstanding Performance by a Female Actor in a Leading Role	Reese Witherspoon	Won	
St. Louis Film Critics Association		Best Actor	Joaquin Phoenix	Nominated	
St. Louis Film Critics Association		Best Actress	Reese Witherspoon	Nominated	
Teen Choice Awards	August 20, 2006	Choice Movie – Drama	Walk the Line	Nominated	
Teen Choice Awards	August 20, 2006	Choice Actress – Drama/Action Adventure	Reese Witherspoon	Won	
Washington D.C. Area Film Critics Association	December 13, 2005	Best Actor	Joaquin Phoenix	Nominated	
Washington D.C. Area Film Critics Association	December 13, 2005	Best Actress	Reese Witherspoon	Won	
Young Artist Awards	March 25, 2006	Best Performance in a Feature Film – Supporting Young Actor	Ridge Canipe	Won	
