= List of accolades received by Good Night, and Good Luck =

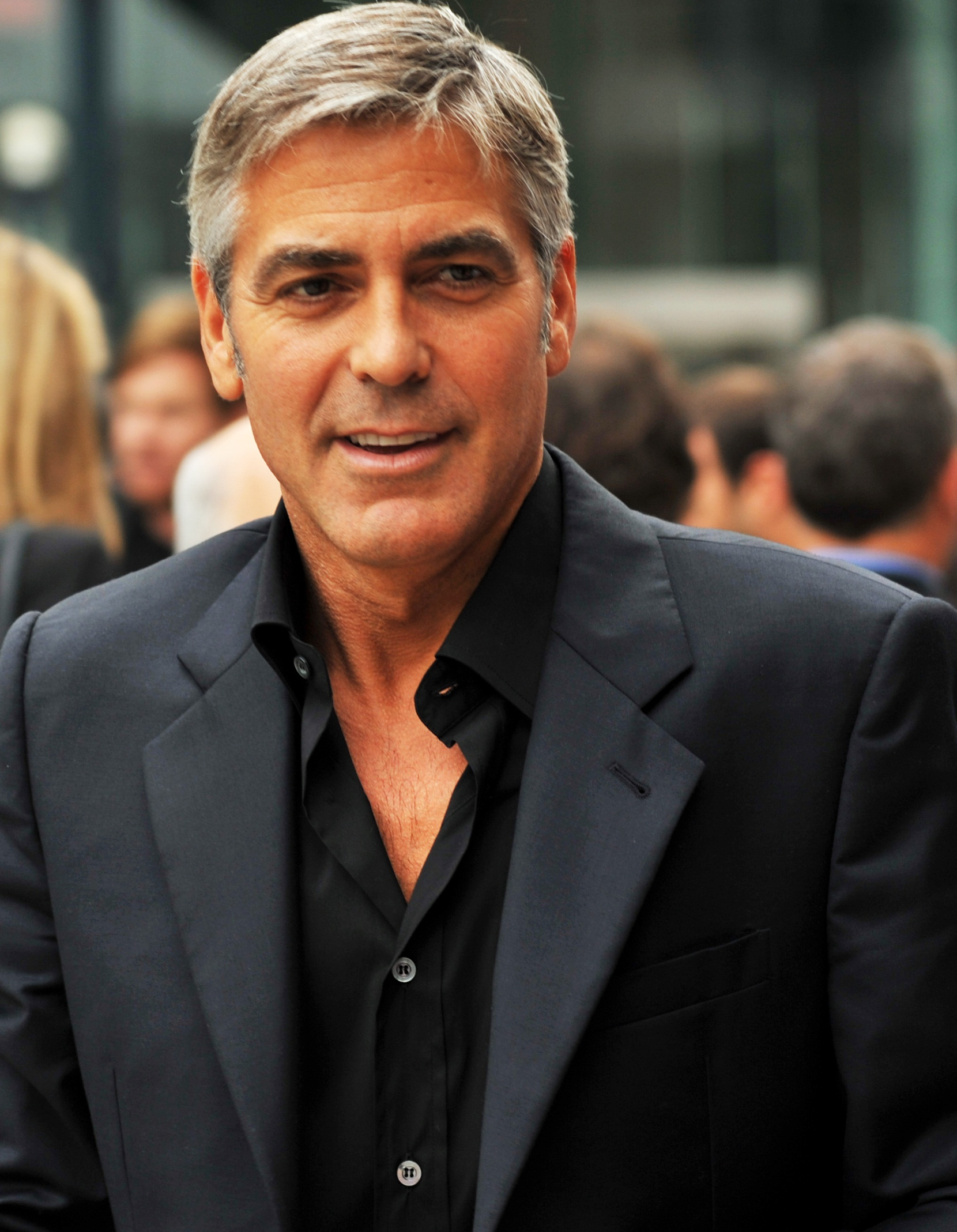
- Director, co-writer and cast member George Clooney received several awards and nominations for his work on the film.
Accolades
Award	Wins	Nominations
AARP Movies for Grownups Awards	3	3
Academy Awards	0	6
ACE Eddie Awards	0	1
African-American Film Critics Association	0	1
American Film Institute	1	1
American Society of Cinematographers	0	1
Art Directors Guild Awards	1	1
Austin Film Critics Association	0	1
Bodil Awards	0	1
Boston Society of Film Critics	1	1
Bratislava International Film Festival	1	1
British Academy Film Awards	0	6
Capri Hollywood International Film Festival	1	1
Chicago Film Critics Association	0	5
Chlotrudis Society for Independent Films	0	3
Cinema for Peace Awards	1	1
Costume Designers Guild Awards	0	1
Critics' Choice Movie Awards	1	6
Dallas–Fort Worth Film Critics Association	1	3
David di Donatello	0	1
Directors Guild of America Awards	0	1
Empire Awards	0	1
European Film Awards	1	1
Film Critics Circle of Australia	1	1
Golden Globe Awards	0	4
Golden Trailer Awards	1	1
Gotham Awards	0	1
Grammy Awards	1	1
Independent Spirit Awards	1	4
International Cinephile Society	2	3
London Film Critics' Circle	0	1
Los Angeles Film Critics Association	3	3
Motion Picture Sound Editors Golden Reel Awards	0	1
Nastro d'Argento	0	1
National Board of Review	2	2
National Society of Film Critics	2	2
New York Film Critics Circle	2	2
New York Film Critics Online	1	1
Online Film Critics Society	1	6
PEN Center USA West Literary Awards	1	1
Producers Guild of America Awards	1	2
Russian Guild of Film Critics	0	1
San Francisco Film Critics Circle	1	1
Sant Jordi Awards	1	1
Satellite Awards	3	9
Screen Actors Guild Awards	0	2
St. Louis Film Critics Association	0	6
Turkish Film Critics Association	0	1
Vancouver Film Critics Circle	0	2
Venice Film Festival	5	5
Village Voice Film Poll	0	2
Washington D.C. Area Film Critics Association	0	5
Women Film Critics Circle	2	2
Writers Guild of America Awards	1	2

Totals (Note: Certain award groups do not simply award one winner. They acknowledge several different recipients, have runners-up, and have third place. Since this is a specific recognition and is different from losing an award, runner-up mentions are considered wins in this award tally. For simplification and to avoid errors, each award in this list has been presumed to have had a prior nomination.)
- Wins: 44
- Nominations: 124

Good Night, and Good Luck is a 2005 historical drama film directed by George Clooney, and starring David Strathairn, Patricia Clarkson, Clooney, Jeff Daniels, Robert Downey Jr. and Frank Langella. The film was co-written by Clooney and Grant Heslov, and portrays the conflict between veteran radio and television journalist Edward R. Murrow (Strathairn) and U.S. Senator Joseph McCarthy of Wisconsin, especially relating to the anti-Communist Senator's actions with the Senate Permanent Subcommittee on Investigations.

The film was a box office success and received critical acclaim. It was nominated for six Academy Awards, including Best Picture, Best Director and Best Actor for Strathairn.

== Accolades ==
Award / Association / Film festival	Date of ceremony	Category	Recipient(s)	Result	Ref(s)
AARP Movies for Grownups Awards	February 7, 2006	Best Movie for Grownups	Good Night, and Good Luck	Runner-up	
AARP Movies for Grownups Awards	February 7, 2006	Breakaway Accomplishment	David Strathairn	Won	
AARP Movies for Grownups Awards	February 7, 2006	Best Movie Time Capsule	Good Night, and Good Luck	Runner-up	
Academy Awards	March 5, 2006	Best Picture	Grant Heslov	Nominated	
Academy Awards	March 5, 2006	Best Director	George Clooney	Nominated	
Academy Awards	March 5, 2006	Best Actor	David Strathairn	Nominated	
Academy Awards	March 5, 2006	Best Original Screenplay	George Clooney and Grant Heslov	Nominated	
Academy Awards	March 5, 2006	Best Cinematography	Robert Elswit	Nominated	
Academy Awards	March 5, 2006	Best Art Direction	James D. Bissell and Jan Pascale	Nominated	
ACE Eddie Awards	February 19, 2006	Best Edited Feature Film – Dramatic	Stephen Mirrione	Nominated	
African-American Film Critics Association	2005	Top Ten Films	Good Night, and Good Luck	3rd place	
American Film Institute	January 13, 2006	Top 10 Movies of the Year	Good Night, and Good Luck	Won	
American Society of Cinematographers	February 26, 2006	Outstanding Achievement in Cinematography in Theatrical Releases	Robert Elswit	Nominated	
Art Directors Guild Awards	February 11, 2006	Excellence in Production Design for a Period or Fantasy Film	James D. Bissell	Nominated	
Austin Film Critics Association	2005	Best Film	Good Night, and Good Luck	10th place	
Bodil Awards	March 5, 2006	Best American Film	Good Night, and Good Luck	Nominated	
Boston Society of Film Critics	December 11, 2005	Best Cinematography	Robert Elswit	Won	
Bratislava International Film Festival	December 2–10, 2005	Best Director	George Clooney	Won	
British Academy Film Awards	February 19, 2006	Best Film	Grant Heslov	Nominated	
British Academy Film Awards	February 19, 2006	Best Director	George Clooney	Nominated	
British Academy Film Awards	February 19, 2006	Best Actor in a Leading Role	David Strathairn	Nominated	
British Academy Film Awards	February 19, 2006	Best Actor in a Supporting Role	George Clooney	Nominated	
British Academy Film Awards	February 19, 2006	Best Original Screenplay	George Clooney and Grant Heslov	Nominated	
British Academy Film Awards	February 19, 2006	Best Editing	Stephen Mirrione	Nominated	
Capri Hollywood International Film Festival	December 27, 2005 – January 2, 2006	Capri Movie of the Year Award	Good Night, and Good Luck	Won	
Chicago Film Critics Association	January 9, 2006	Best Picture	Good Night, and Good Luck	Nominated	
Chicago Film Critics Association	January 9, 2006	Best Director	George Clooney	Nominated	
Chicago Film Critics Association	January 9, 2006	Best Actor	David Strathairn	Nominated	
Chicago Film Critics Association	January 9, 2006	Best Screenplay	George Clooney and Grant Heslov	Nominated	
Chicago Film Critics Association	January 9, 2006	Best Cinematography	Robert Elswit	Nominated	
Chlotrudis Society for Independent Films	March 19, 2006	Best Director	George Clooney	Nominated	
Chlotrudis Society for Independent Films	March 19, 2006	Best Actor	David Strathairn	Nominated	
Chlotrudis Society for Independent Films	March 19, 2006	Best Visual Design	Good Night, and Good Luck	Nominated	
Cinema for Peace Awards	February 13, 2006	Most Valuable Film of the Year	Good Night, and Good Luck	Won	
Costume Designers Guild Awards	February 25, 2006	Excellence in Period Film	Louise Frogley	Nominated	
Critics' Choice Awards	January 9, 2006	Best Picture	Good Night, and Good Luck	Nominated	
Critics' Choice Awards	January 9, 2006	Best Director	George Clooney	Nominated	
Critics' Choice Awards	January 9, 2006	Best Actor	David Strathairn	Nominated	
Critics' Choice Awards	January 9, 2006	Best Writer	George Clooney and Grant Heslov	Nominated	
Critics' Choice Awards	January 9, 2006	Best Acting Ensemble	Good Night, and Good Luck	Nominated	
Critics' Choice Awards	January 9, 2006	Freedom Award	George Clooney	Won	
Dallas–Fort Worth Film Critics Association	December 19, 2005	Top 10 Films	Good Night, and Good Luck	3rd place	
Dallas–Fort Worth Film Critics Association	December 19, 2005	Best Director	George Clooney	Runner-up	
Dallas–Fort Worth Film Critics Association	December 19, 2005	Best Actor	David Strathairn	3rd place	
David di Donatello	April 21, 2006	Best Foreign Film	George Clooney	Nominated	
Directors Guild of America Awards	January 28, 2006	Outstanding Directorial Achievement in Motion Pictures	George Clooney	Nominated	
Empire Awards	March 27, 2007	Best Director	George Clooney	Nominated	
European Film Awards	December 3, 2005	Best Non-European Film	George Clooney	Won	
Film Critics Circle of Australia	October 28, 2006	Best Foreign Film – English Language	Good Night, and Good Luck	Won	
Golden Globe Awards	January 16, 2006	Best Motion Picture – Drama	Good Night, and Good Luck	Nominated	
Golden Globe Awards	January 16, 2006	Best Director	George Clooney	Nominated	
Golden Globe Awards	January 16, 2006	Best Actor in a Motion Picture – Drama	David Strathairn	Nominated	
Golden Globe Awards	January 16, 2006	Best Screenplay	George Clooney and Grant Heslov	Nominated	
Golden Trailer Awards	June 1, 2006	Best Drama	Good Night, and Good Luck	Won	
Gotham Awards	November 30, 2005	Best Ensemble Cast	David Strathairn, Patricia Clarkson, George Clooney, Jeff Daniels, Robert Downey Jr., and Frank Langella	Nominated	
Grammy Awards	February 8, 2006	Best Jazz Vocal Album	Dianne Reeves (for Good Night, and Good Luck)	Won	
Independent Spirit Awards	March 4, 2006	Best Feature	Grant Heslov	Nominated	
Independent Spirit Awards	March 4, 2006	Best Male Lead	David Strathairn	Nominated	
Independent Spirit Awards	March 4, 2006	Best Director	George Clooney	Nominated	
Independent Spirit Awards	March 4, 2006	Best Cinematography	Robert Elswit	Won	
International Cinephile Society	2006	Best Picture	Good Night, and Good Luck	5th place	
International Cinephile Society	2006	Best Original Screenplay	George Clooney and Grant Heslov	Runner-up	
International Cinephile Society	2006	Best Ensemble	Good Night, and Good Luck	Won	
London Film Critics' Circle	February 8, 2007	Actor of the Year	David Strathairn	Nominated	
Los Angeles Film Critics Association	January 17, 2006	Best Supporting Actor	Frank Langella	Runner-up	
Los Angeles Film Critics Association	January 17, 2006	Best Cinematography	Robert Elswit	Won	
Los Angeles Film Critics Association	January 17, 2006	Best Production Design	James D. Bissell	Runner-up	
Motion Picture Sound Editors Golden Reel Awards	March 4, 2006	Best Sound Editing in Feature Film – Dialogue & ADR	Curt Schulkey, Aaron Glascock, and Susan Dudeck	Nominated	
Nastro d'Argento	February 7, 2006	Best Director of a Foreign Film	George Clooney	Nominated	
National Board of Review	January 10, 2006	Best Film	Good Night, and Good Luck	Won	
National Board of Review	January 10, 2006	Top Ten Films	Good Night, and Good Luck	Won	
National Society of Film Critics	January 7, 2006	Best Supporting Actor	Frank Langella	Runner-up	
National Society of Film Critics	January 7, 2006	Best Cinematography	Robert Elswit	Runner-up	
New York Film Critics Circle	January 8, 2006	Best Film	Good Night, and Good Luck	Runner-up	
New York Film Critics Circle	January 8, 2006	Best Cinematographer	Robert Elswit	Runner-up	
New York Film Critics Online	December 11, 2005	Top 9 Films	Good Night, and Good Luck	Won	
Online Film Critics Society	January 16, 2006	Best Picture	Good Night, and Good Luck	Nominated	
Online Film Critics Society	January 16, 2006	Best Director	George Clooney	Nominated	
Online Film Critics Society	January 16, 2006	Best Actor	David Strathairn	Nominated	
Online Film Critics Society	January 16, 2006	Best Original Screenplay	George Clooney and Grant Heslov	Won	
Online Film Critics Society	January 16, 2006	Best Cinematography	Robert Elswit	Nominated	
Online Film Critics Society	January 16, 2006	Best Editing	Stephen Mirrione	Nominated	
PEN Center USA West Literary Awards	December 12, 2006	Screenplay	George Clooney and Grant Heslov	Won	
Producers Guild of America Awards	January 22, 2006	Outstanding Producer of Theatrical Motion Pictures	Grant Heslov	Nominated	
Producers Guild of America Awards	January 22, 2006	Stanley Kramer Award	Good Night, and Good Luck	Won	
Russian Guild of Film Critics	February 6, 2007	Best Foreign Film	Good Night, and Good Luck	Nominated	
San Francisco Film Critics Circle	December 12, 2005	Best Screenplay	George Clooney and Grant Heslov	Won	
Sant Jordi Awards	April 23, 2007	Best Foreign Film	Good Night, and Good Luck	Won	
Satellite Awards	December 17, 2005	Best Actor in a Motion Picture, Drama	David Strathairn	Nominated	
Satellite Awards	December 17, 2005	Best Director	George Clooney	Nominated	
Satellite Awards	December 17, 2005	Best Original Screenplay	George Clooney and Grant Heslov	Won	
Satellite Awards	December 17, 2005	Best Cinematography	Robert Elswit	Nominated	
Satellite Awards	December 17, 2005	Best Editing	Stephen Mirrione	Nominated	
Satellite Awards	December 17, 2005	Best Art Direction and Production Design	James D. Bissell	Won	
Satellite Awards	December 17, 2005	Auteur Award	George Clooney	Won	
Satellite Awards	December 18, 2006	Best Overall DVD	Good Night, and Good Luck	Nominated	
Satellite Awards	December 18, 2006	Best DVD Extras	Good Night, and Good Luck	Nominated	
Screen Actors Guild Awards	January 29, 2006	Outstanding Performance by a Male Actor in a Leading Role	David Strathairn	Nominated	
Screen Actors Guild Awards	January 29, 2006	Outstanding Performance by a Cast in a Motion Picture	Rose Abdoo, Alex Borstein, Robert John Burke, Patricia Clarkson, George Clooney, Jeff Daniels, Reed Diamond, Tate Donovan, Robert Downey Jr., Grant Heslov, Peter Jacobson, Frank Langella, Tom McCarthy, Dianne Reeves, Matt Ross, David Strathairn and Ray Wise	Nominated	
St. Louis Film Critics Association		Best Picture	Good Night, and Good Luck	Nominated	
St. Louis Film Critics Association		Best Director	George Clooney	Nominated	
St. Louis Film Critics Association		Best Actor	David Strathairn	Nominated	
St. Louis Film Critics Association		Best Supporting Actor	George Clooney	Nominated	
St. Louis Film Critics Association		Best Screenplay	George Clooney and Grant Heslov	Nominated	
St. Louis Film Critics Association		Best Cinematography or Visual/Special Effects	Robert Elswit	Nominated	
Turkish Film Critics Association	January 22, 2007	Best Foreign Film	Good Night, and Good Luck	11th place	
Vancouver Film Critics Circle	February 7, 2006	Best Film	Good Night, and Good Luck	Nominated	
Vancouver Film Critics Circle	February 7, 2006	Best Director	George Clooney	Nominated	
Venice Film Festival	August 31 – September 10, 2005	FIPRESCI Award for Best Film	Good Night, and Good Luck	Won	
Venice Film Festival	August 31 – September 10, 2005	Pasinetti Award for Best Film	Good Night, and Good Luck	Won	
Venice Film Festival	August 31 – September 10, 2005	Volpi Cup for Best Actor	David Strathairn	Won	
Venice Film Festival	August 31 – September 10, 2005	Golden Osella for Best Screenplay	George Clooney and Grant Heslov	Won	
Venice Film Festival	August 31 – September 10, 2005	Human Rights Film Network Award	Good Night, and Good Luck	Won	
Village Voice Film Poll	December 2005	Best Performance	David Strathairn	10th place	
Village Voice Film Poll	December 2005	Best Supporting Performance	Frank Langella	10th place	
Washington D.C. Area Film Critics Association	December 13, 2005	Best Film	Good Night, and Good Luck	Nominated	
Washington D.C. Area Film Critics Association	December 13, 2005	Best Director	George Clooney	Nominated	
Washington D.C. Area Film Critics Association	December 13, 2005	Best Actor	David Strathairn	Nominated	
Washington D.C. Area Film Critics Association	December 13, 2005	Best Original Screenplay	George Clooney and Grant Heslov	Nominated	
Washington D.C. Area Film Critics Association	December 13, 2005	Best Ensemble	Good Night, and Good Luck	Nominated	
Women Film Critics Circle	December 28, 2005	Best Actor	David Strathairn	Won	
Women Film Critics Circle	December 28, 2005	Best Soundtrack	Dianne Reeves	Won	
Writers Guild of America Awards	February 4, 2006	Best Original Screenplay	George Clooney and Grant Heslov	Nominated	
Writers Guild of America Awards	February 4, 2006	Paul Selvin Award	George Clooney and Grant Heslov	Won	
