= Hustle & Flow =

2005 film directed by Craig Brewer

- Theatrical release poster
- Directed by: Craig Brewer
- Written by: Craig Brewer
- Produced by: Stephanie Allain; John Singleton
- Starring: Terrence Howard; Anthony Anderson; Taryn Manning; Taraji P. Henson; Paula Jai Parker; Elise Neal; DJ Qualls; Ludacris
- Cinematography: Amy Vincent
- Edited by: Billy Fox
- Music by: Scott Bomar
- Production company: New Deal Entertainment
- Distributed by: Paramount Classics; MTV Films
- Release date: July 22, 2005
- Running time: 116 minutes
- Country: United States
- Language: English
- Budget: $2.8 million
- Box office: $23.5 million

Hustle & Flow is a 2005 American drama film written and directed by Craig Brewer. The film stars Terrence Howard as a Memphis hustler and pimp who dreams of becoming a rapper. The ensemble cast includes Anthony Anderson, Taryn Manning, Taraji P. Henson, Paula Jai Parker, Elise Neal, DJ Qualls and Ludacris. Produced by John Singleton and Stephanie Allain, the film tells the story of one man's struggle to turn his life around through music.

Hustle & Flow was released on July 22, 2005, by Paramount Classics and MTV Films, and received positive reviews from critics, who praised the performances—particularly those of Howard and Henson—as well as Brewer's direction and the film's soundtrack. The film emerged as a commercial success at the box-office, grossing $23.5 million against a production budget of $2.8 million.

Hustle & Flow garnered several accolades, including two nominations at the 78th Academy Awards: Best Actor (Howard) and Best Original Song for Three 6 Mafia's song "It's Hard out Here for a Pimp", winning the latter, thus becoming the second hip-hop song to win an Academy Award, following Eminem's "Lose Yourself" from 8 Mile (2002).

== Plot ==
DJay, a pimp and drug dealer in Memphis, Tennessee, is dissatisfied with his life but feels powerless to change it. After reconnecting with his old friend Key, a sound technician, DJay is inspired to try his hand at hip hop music. Backed by Key and Shelby, a sound mixer, DJay begins creating songs that reflect his frustrations with life in the ghetto. Despite his lack of experience, DJay proves to be a talented lyricist and rapper. The group quickly records several promising songs, including "Whoop That Trick" and "It's Hard out Here for a Pimp".

However, the road to success is fraught with setbacks. DJay hustles to secure the necessary equipment and recording time, even going so far as to offer Nola, his top prostitute, to a microphone salesman in exchange for gear. Nola is embittered and yells at DJay for how he treats her; embarrassed, he agrees to let her play a bigger role in his plans. Meanwhile, Key's marriage suffers under the strain of the project, and DJay expels Lexus, one of his other prostitutes, and her infant son after she mocks his ambitions. Shug, DJay's former top girl who is now pregnant and in need of money, starts providing hooks for his songs, and a romantic connection develops between her and DJay.

DJay learns that Skinny Black, a popular Memphis gangsta rapper he credits as his main influence, will be attending a local Fourth of July party. DJay attends the event under the pretext of providing marijuana so he can give Skinny his demo tape. Initially dismissive, Skinny finally takes the demo after DJay plays to his ego. However, before DJay leaves, he discovers that a drunken Skinny trashed the demo. Enraged, DJay confronts Skinny, who insults him. DJay snaps and beats Skinny nearly to death before attempting to revive him. When one of Skinny's associates confronts him, DJay seizes Skinny's gun and shoots the man in the arm before fleeing.

Upon returning home, DJay finds the police waiting for him. He is arrested, but before being taken away, he entrusts Nola with his lyrics and instructs her to hustle every radio station in Memphis to play his songs. As DJay is led away, he shares a tearful look with Shug. DJay is sentenced to eleven months in prison for assault and firearm possession.

While in prison, DJay is visited by Key, who informs him that Nola has successfully gotten several radio DJs to put him into their rotations, and that he's now being recognized as a hot new talent in Memphis. Humbled by his success, DJay and Key begin discussing future business plans. In a final moment of validation, two correctional officers ask DJay to listen to their demo, and DJay, recognizing their ambition, agrees.

== Cast ==
- Terrence Howard as DJay
- Anthony Anderson as Key
- Taryn Manning as Nola
- Taraji P. Henson as Shug
- DJ Qualls as Shelby
- Ludacris as Skinny Black
- Paula Jai Parker as Lexus
- Elise Neal as Yevette
- Juicy J as Tigga
- Haystak as Mickey
- DJ Paul as R.L.
- I-20 as Yellow Jacket
- Isaac Hayes as Arnel

== Production ==
Terrence Howard initially turned down the role of DJay. He was reportedly hesitant to take on the part, as he wanted to avoid being typecast in a stereotypical "pimp" archetype. However, after reflecting on the complexity and emotional depth of the character, Howard reconsidered and ultimately accepted the role.

The film faced years of rejection and setbacks from major studios and financiers before finally securing backing. Longtime supporter John Singleton played a pivotal role in its production. In the DVD extras, Singleton expressed his frustration with the industry's reluctance to recognize the film's potential, stating that he ultimately decided to fund the project himself because he believed it deserved the chance to be made.

Anthony Anderson was accused of raping a 25-year-old extra in a trailer on the film set of the movie on July 27, 2004. The charges were dropped on October 6, 2004, because the judge ruled that there was no probable cause to try the case.

Due to the unique cultural significance of "hustle" and "flow" in African American culture, translating the film's title for international audiences proved difficult. In Russia, for instance, the title was translated to "The Bustle and the Motion", while in Italy, it was appended with "Il colore della musica" ("The Color of Music"). In China, the film was released under the title "Street Hip Hop", reflecting an attempt to capture its essence for non-English-speaking viewers.

== Critical reception ==
On the review aggregator website Rotten Tomatoes, 83% of 161 critics' reviews are positive, with an average rating of 7.3/10. The website's consensus reads: "Hustle & Flow is gritty and redemptive, with a profound sense of place and exciting music." On Metacritic, the film holds a weighted average score of 68 out of 100 based on 37 critics, indicating "generally favorable" reviews.

In a review for The Boston Globe, the film was noted for evoking different reactions: "Some will find it chicly inspired, recalling blaxploitation's heyday with its grimy urban realism. Some will find it corny, absurd, and a limited view of options for disenfranchised African-Americans." Entertainment Weekly praised the film's musical sequences, stating, "The home-studio recording sequences in Hustle & Flow are funky, rowdy, and indelible. Craig Brewer gives us the pleasure of watching characters create music from the ground up."

== Legacy ==
The phrase "Whoop That Trick", which was prominently featured in Hustle & Flow, became a rallying cry for fans of the Memphis Grizzlies basketball team during the early 2020s. The chant gained widespread popularity and was used by fans to energize the team during games, further solidifying the cultural impact of the film and its music within the city of Memphis.

== Accolades ==
Award	Date of ceremony	Category	Recipient(s)	Result	Ref.
Academy Awards	March 5, 2006	Best Actor	Terrence Howard	Nominated	
Academy Awards	March 5, 2006	Best Original Song	Frayser Boy, Juicy J, and DJ Paul (for "It's Hard out Here for a Pimp")	Won	
African-American Film Critics Association	2005	Top Ten Films	Hustle & Flow	7th place	
African-American Film Critics Association	2005	Best Actor	Terrence Howard	Won	
Austin Film Critics Association	2005	Best Film	Hustle & Flow	6th place	
Austin Film Critics Association	2005	Breakthrough Artist	Terrence Howard	Won	
Black Reel Awards	February 18, 2006	Best Film	Hustle & Flow	Nominated	
Black Reel Awards	February 18, 2006	Best Actor	Terrence Howard	Won	
Black Reel Awards	February 18, 2006	Best Supporting Actor	Anthony Anderson	Nominated	
Black Reel Awards	February 18, 2006	Best Supporting Actress	Taraji P. Henson	Won	
Black Reel Awards	February 18, 2006	Best Original Soundtrack	Hustle & Flow	Won	
Black Reel Awards	February 18, 2006	Best Ensemble	Hustle & Flow	Nominated	
Chicago Film Critics Association	January 9, 2006	Best Actor	Terrence Howard	Nominated	
Chicago Film Critics Association	January 9, 2006	Most Promising Filmmaker	Craig Brewer	Nominated	
Chicago Film Critics Association	January 9, 2006	Most Promising Performer	Chris "Ludacris" Bridges	Nominated	
Costume Designers Guild Awards	February 25, 2006	Excellence in Contemporary Film	Paul A. Simmons Jr.	Nominated	
Critics' Choice Awards	January 9, 2006	Best Actor	Terrence Howard	Nominated	
Critics' Choice Awards	January 9, 2006	Best Song	Terrence Howard (for "Hustle & Flow")	Won	
Florida Film Critics Circle	December 24, 2005	Pauline Kael Breakout Award	Terrence Howard	Won	
Golden Globe Awards	January 16, 2006	Best Actor in a Motion Picture – Drama	Terrence Howard	Nominated	
Golden Trailer Awards	June 1, 2006	Best Drama	Hustle & Flow	Nominated	
Gotham Awards	November 30, 2005	Breakthrough Actor	Terrence Howard	Nominated	
Independent Spirit Awards	March 4, 2006	Best Male Lead	Terrence Howard	Nominated	
Motion Picture Sound Editors Golden Reel Awards	March 4, 2006	Best Sound Editing – Music – Musical Feature Film	Shie Rozow and Marvin Morris	Nominated	
MTV Movie Awards	June 3, 2006	Best Performance	Terrence Howard	Nominated	
MTV Movie Awards	June 3, 2006	Best Breakthrough Performance	Taraji P. Henson	Nominated	
MTV Movie Awards	June 3, 2006	Best Kiss	Taraji P. Henson and Terrence Howard	Nominated	
NAACP Image Awards	February 25, 2006	Outstanding Motion Picture	Hustle & Flow	Nominated	
NAACP Image Awards	February 25, 2006	Outstanding Actor in a Motion Picture	Terrence Howard	Nominated	
NAACP Image Awards	February 25, 2006	Outstanding Supporting Actor in a Motion Picture	Anthony Anderson	Nominated	
NAACP Image Awards	February 25, 2006	Outstanding Supporting Actress in a Motion Picture	Taraji P. Henson	Nominated	
NAACP Image Awards	February 25, 2006	Outstanding Supporting Actress in a Motion Picture	Elise Neal	Nominated	
Nashville Film Festival	April 14–21, 2005	Audience Choice Award for Best Feature	Craig Brewer	Won	
National Board of Review	January 10, 2006	Breakthrough Performance by an Actor	Terrence Howard	Won	
National Board of Review	January 10, 2006	Special Recognition For Excellence In Filmmaking	Hustle & Flow	Won	
New York Film Critics Online	11 December 2005	Breakthrough Performance	Terrence Howard| style="background: #9EFF9E; color: #000; vertical-align: middle; text-align: center; " class="yes table-yes2 notheme"|Won		
Online Film Critics Society	January 16, 2006	Best Actor	Terrence Howard| style="background: #9EFF9E; color: #000; vertical-align: middle; text-align: center; " class="yes table-yes2 notheme"|Won	Nominated	
Online Film Critics Society	January 16, 2006	Best Breakthrough Filmmaker	Craig Brewer	Nominated	
Satellite Awards	December 17, 2005	Best Motion Picture, Musical or Comedy	Hustle & Flow	Nominated	
Satellite Awards	December 17, 2005	Best Actor in a Motion Picture, Musical or Comedy	Terrence Howard	Won	
Screen Actors Guild Awards	January 29, 2006	Outstanding Performance by a Cast in a Motion Picture	Anthony Anderson, Chris "Ludacris" Bridges, Isaac Hayes, Taraji P. Henson, Terrence Howard, Taryn Manning, Elise Neal, Paula Jai Parker, and DJ Qualls	Nominated	
Sundance Film Festival	January 29, 2005	Audience Award: U.S. Dramatic	Hustle & Flow	Won	
Sundance Film Festival	January 29, 2005	Excellence in Cinematography Award: U.S. Dramatic	Amy Vincent	Won	
Teen Choice Awards	August 16, 2005	Choice Summer Movie	Hustle & Flow	Nominated	
Teen Choice Awards	August 20, 2006	Choice Actor – Drama/Action Adventure	Terrence Howard	Nominated	
Teen Choice Awards	August 20, 2006	Choice Actor – Drama/Action Adventure	Chris "Ludacris" Bridges	Nominated	
Vancouver Film Critics Circle	February 7, 2006	Best Actor	Terrence Howard	Nominated	
Village Voice Film Poll	December 2005	Best Performance	Terrence Howard	9th place	
Washington D.C. Area Film Critics Association	December 13, 2005	Best Actor	Terrence Howard	Nominated	
Washington D.C. Area Film Critics Association	December 13, 2005	Best Supporting Actress	Taraji P. Henson	Nominated	
Washington D.C. Area Film Critics Association	December 13, 2005	Best Original Screenplay	Craig Brewer	Nominated	
Washington D.C. Area Film Critics Association	December 13, 2005	Best Breakthrough Performance	Terrence Howard	Won	
Washington D.C. Area Film Critics Association	December 13, 2005	Best Breakthrough Performance	Taryn Manning	Nominated	
Women Film Critics Circle	December 28, 2005	Best Comedic Performance	Paula Jai Parker	Won	

== Soundtrack ==
The soundtrack for Hustle & Flow was released on July 12, 2005, by Grand Hustle and Atlantic Records. The album primarily focuses on Southern hip hop, reflecting the film's Memphis setting and the music culture that plays a central role in the story. The soundtrack features several original songs, including "It's Hard out Here for a Pimp", which went on to win the Academy Award for Best Original Song.

== See also ==
- List of hood films
