= Broadcast Film Critics Association Awards 2006 =

Broadcast Film Critics Association Awards 2006 may refer to:

- 11th Critics' Choice Awards, the eleventen Critics' Choice Awards ceremony that took place in 2006
- 12th Critics' Choice Awards, the twelfth Critics' Choice Awards ceremony that took place in 2007 and which honored the best in film for 2006
