= Broadcast Film Critics Association Awards 2005 =

Broadcast Film Critics Association Awards 2005 may refer to:

- 10th Critics' Choice Awards, the tenth Critics' Choice Awards ceremony that took place in 2005
- 11th Critics' Choice Awards, the eleventh Critics' Choice Awards ceremony that took place in 2006 and which honored the best in film for 2005
