= Amy Vincent =

American cinematographer

- Born: Boston, Massachusetts, U.S.
- Other name: Amelia Vincent
- Occupation: Cinematographer

Amy Vincent is an American cinematographer who has been a member of the A.S.C. since 2002. She won the Excellence in Cinematography award at the 2005 Sundance Film Festival for her work on Hustle and Flow.

On March 3, 2024, Vincent received the President's Award from the American Society of Cinematographers.

== Life and career ==
Amy Vincent was born in Boston, Massachusetts. She studied theater arts and film at the University of California, Santa Cruz from 1977 to 1983, and studied cinematography at the American Film Institute from 1990 to 1992. Her first job in the film industry was in the archive dept. of Warner Bros. Vincent was selected for an internship in the camera department of Warner Bros., and she later joined the International Cinematographer's Guild. She said in an interview with MovieMaker, “I came up in a very old school way - interning in the camera department, loading, assisting, and operating with people like John Lindley, Bob Richardson, Bill Pope. I didn’t even realize how much I learned from those guys until I finally got to shoot a film myself.”

== Awards ==
- 2005 won the Vision Award at the Sundance Film Festival for Hustle & Flow
- 2001 won the Women in Film Kodak Vision Award for outstanding achievements in cinematography and for collaborating and assisting women in the entertainment industry.

== Filmography ==
Year	Title	Role	Notes
2027	Snoop		
2025	Song Sung Blue		
2015	Sinister 2		uncredited
2014	A Million Ways to Die in the West	"c" camera operator	
2011	Abduction	additional photography	
2011	Footloose		Remake of 1984 film of the same name
2011	Zookeeper	2nd unit director of photography	
2010	The Experiment		
2010	Quit	additional photography	
2007	The Good Life		
2007	Mr. Brooks	2nd unit director of photography	
2006	Black Snake Moan		
2006	This Film Is Not Yet Rated		
2005	Hustle & Flow		
2005	Bewitched	2nd unit director of photography	
2004	Lemony Snicket's A Series of Unfortunate Events	2nd unit director of photography	
2004	I Heart Huckabees	"b" camera operator	
2004	Freshman Orientation		aka Home of Phobia
2001	The Caveman's Valentine		aka The Sign of the Killer
2000	Kin		
2000	Freedom Song	television	
2000	Way Past Cool		
1999	Walking Across Egypt		aka Leading with Her Heart
1999	Jawbreaker		
1998	Some Girl		aka Girl Talk / Men
1998	Dr. Hugo		
1997	Eve's Bayou		
1995	The Party Favor		
1995	Tuesday Morning Ride		
1995	Animal Room		
1994	Death in Venice, CA		
1994	Two Over Easy		
