= Vancouver Film Critics Circle Award for Best Actor =

Canadian film award

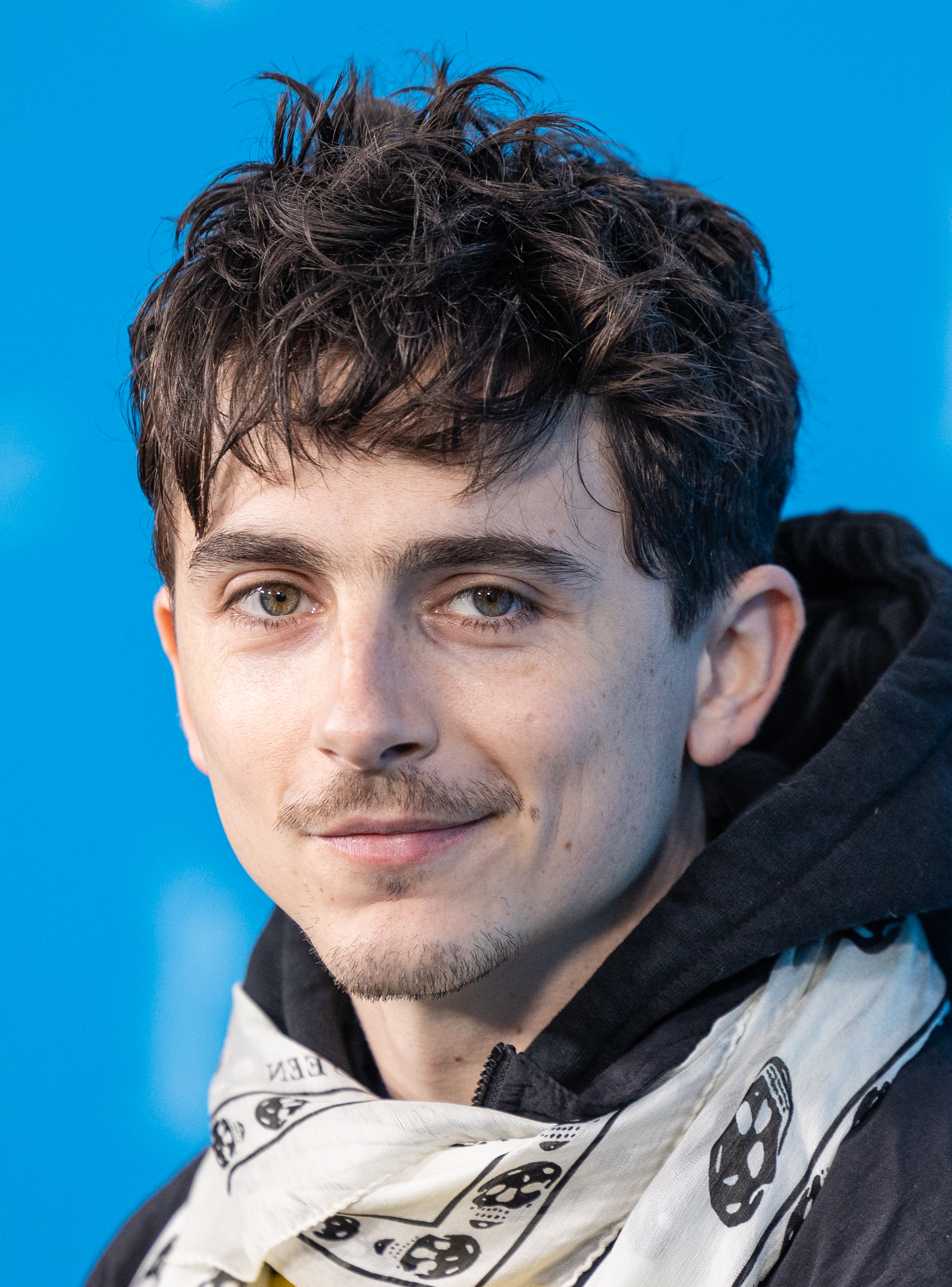
The 2025 recipient: Timothée Chalamet

The Vancouver Film Critics Circle Award for Best Actor is an annual award given by the Vancouver Film Critics Circle.

== Winners ==
=== 2000s ===
Year	Winner and nominees	Film	Role	Ref
2000	Benicio del Toro	Traffic	Javier Rodriguez	
2000	Mark Ruffalo	You Can Count on Me	Terry Prescott	
2000	Billy Crudup	Jesus' Son	FH	
2000	Billy Crudup	Almost Famous	Russell Hammond	
2001	Steve Buscemi	Ghost World	Seymour	
2001	Russell Crowe	A Beautiful Mind	John Nash	
2001	Tom Wilkinson	In the Bedroom	Matt Fowler	
2002	Daniel Day-Lewis	Gangs of New York	William "Bill the Butcher" Cutting	
2002	Adrien Brody	The Pianist	Władysław Szpilman	
2002	Nicolas Cage	Adaptation.	Charlie and Donald Kaufman	
2003	Sean Penn	Mystic River	Jimmy Markum	
2003	Ben Kingsley	House of Sand and Fog	Behrani	
2003	Bill Murray	Lost in Translation	Bob Harris	
2004	Jamie Foxx	Ray	Ray Charles	
2004	Paul Giamatti	Sideways	Miles Raymond	
2004	Liam Neeson	Kinsey	Alfred Kinsey	
2005	Philip Seymour Hoffman	Capote	Truman Capote	
2005	Terrence Howard	Hustle & Flow	Djay	
2005	Heath Ledger	Brokeback Mountain	Ennis Del Mar	
2006	Forest Whitaker	The Last King of Scotland	Idi Amin	
2006	Leonardo DiCaprio	The Departed	William "Billy" Costigan Jr.	
2006	Ryan Gosling	Half Nelson	Dan Dunne	
2007	Daniel Day-Lewis	There Will Be Blood	Daniel Plainview	
2007	Emile Hirsch	Into the Wild	Christopher McCandless	
2007	Viggo Mortensen	Eastern Promises	Nikolai Luzhin	
2008	Sean Penn	Milk	Harvey Milk	
2008	Frank Langella	Frost/Nixon	Richard Nixon	
2008	Mickey Rourke	The Wrestler	Randy Robinson	
2009	Colin Firth	A Single Man	George Falconer	
2009	George Clooney	Up in the Air	Ryan Bingham	
2009	Jeremy Renner	The Hurt Locker	SFC. William James	

=== 2010s ===
Year	Winner and nominees	Film	Role	Ref
2010	Colin Firth	The King's Speech	King George VI	
2010	Jesse Eisenberg	The Social Network	Mark Zuckerberg	
2010	James Franco	127 Hours	Aron Ralston	
2011	Michael Fassbender	Shame	Brandon Sullivan	
2011	Jean Dujardin	The Artist	George Valentin	
2011	Michael Shannon	Take Shelter	Curtis LaForche	
2012	Joaquin Phoenix	The Master	Freddie Quell	
2012	John Hawkes	The Sessions	Mark O'Brian	
2012	Daniel Day-Lewis	Lincoln	Abraham Lincoln	
2013	Oscar Isaac	Inside Llewyn Davis	Llewyn Davis	
2013	Chiwetel Ejiofor	12 Years a Slave	Solomon Northup	
2013	Matthew McConaughey	Dallas Buyers Club	Ron Woodroof	
2014	Jake Gyllenhaal	Nightcrawler	Lou Bloom	
2014	Benedict Cumberbatch	The Imitation Game	Alan Turing	
2014	Michael Keaton	Birdman or (The Unexpected Virtue of Ignorance)	Riggan Thomson	
2015	Michael Fassbender	Steve Jobs	Steve Jobs	
2015	Leonardo DiCaprio	The Revenant	Hugh Glass	
2015	Eddie Redmayne	The Danish Girl	Lili Elbe	
2016	Casey Affleck	Manchester by the Sea	Lee Chandler	
2016	Ryan Gosling	La La Land	Sebastian Wilder	
2016	Denzel Washington	Fences	Troy Maxson	
2017	Daniel Day-Lewis	Phantom Thread	Reynolds Woodcock	
2017	Timothée Chalamet	Call Me by Your Name	Elio Perlman	
2017	Gary Oldman	Darkest Hour	Winston Churchill	
2018	Ethan Hawke	First Reformed	Ernst Toller	
2018	Christian Bale	Vice	Dick Cheney	
2018	Viggo Mortensen	Green Book	Tony Lip	
2019	Adam Driver	Marriage Story	Charlie Barber	
2019	Antonio Banderas	Pain and Glory	Salvador Mallo	
2019	Joaquin Phoenix	Joker	The Joker	

=== 2020s ===
Year	Winner and nominees	Film	Role	Ref
2020	Chadwick Boseman	Ma Rainey's Black Bottom	Levee Green	
2020	Riz Ahmed	Sound of Metal	Ruben Stone	
2020	Anthony Hopkins	The Father	Anthony	
2020	Gary Oldman	Mank	Herman J. Mankiewicz	
2021	Andrew Garfield	Tick, Tick... Boom!	Jonathan Larson	
2021	Bradley Cooper	Nightmare Alley	Stan Carlisle	
2021	Denzel Washington	The Tragedy of Macbeth	Lord Macbeth	
2022	Colin Farrell	The Banshees of Inisherin	Pádraic Súilleabháin	
2022	Austin Butler	Elvis	Elvis Presley	
2022	Paul Mescal	Aftersun	Calum	
2023	Paul Giamatti	The Holdovers	Paul Hunham	
2023	Bradley Cooper	Maestro	Leonard Bernstein	
2023	Cillian Murphy	Oppenheimer	J. Robert Oppenheimer	
2024	Timothée Chalamet	A Complete Unknown	Bob Dylan	
2024	Adrien Brody	The Brutalist	László Tóth	
2024	Colman Domingo	Sing Sing	John "Divine G" Whitfield	
2025	Timothée Chalamet	Marty Supreme	Marty Mauser	
2025	Leonardo DiCaprio	One Battle After Another	Bob Ferguson	
2025	Joel Edgerton	Train Dreams	Robert Grainier	
