= Florida Film Critics Circle Awards 2005 =

Annual US film awards ceremony

10th FFCC Awards

December 24, 2005

Best Film:
Brokeback Mountain

The 10th Florida Film Critics Circle Awards, given by the Florida Film Critics Circle on 24 December 2005, honored the best in film for 2005.

Brokeback Mountain from director Ang Lee received 4 awards, including Best Picture and Director (Lee). The awards for best lead acting went to Hoffman (Capote) and Witherspoon (Walk the Line).

== Winners ==
- Best Actor:
  - Philip Seymour Hoffman - Capote
- Best Actress:
  - Reese Witherspoon - Walk the Line
- Best Animated Film:
  - Wallace and Gromit: The Curse of the Were-Rabbit
- Best Cinematography:
  - Brokeback Mountain - Rodrigo Prieto
- Best Director:
  - Ang Lee - Brokeback Mountain
- Best Documentary Film:
  - Grizzly Man
- Best Film:
  - Brokeback Mountain
- Best Foreign Language Film:
  - Kung fu (Kung Fu Hustle) • China/Hong Kong
- Best Screenplay:
  - Brokeback Mountain - Larry McMurtry and Diana Ossana
- Best Supporting Actor:
  - Paul Giamatti - Cinderella Man
- Best Supporting Actress:
  - Amy Adams - Junebug
- Golden Orange for Outstanding Contribution to Film:
  - Gregory von Hausch
- Pauline Kael Breakout Award:
  - Terrence Howard - Hustle & Flow & Crash
