= Online Film Critics Society Award for Best Breakthrough Filmmaker =

Former annual film award

The Online Film Critics Society Award for Best Breakthrough Filmmaker is an annual film award given by the Online Film Critics Society to honor the best breakthrough filmmaker of the year.

== Winners ==
- 1999 (as Best Debut): Spike Jonze

for directing Being John Malkovich

- 2001: Christopher Nolan

for directing Memento

- 2002: Mark Romanek

for directing One Hour Photo

- 2003: Shari Springer Berman and Robert Pulcini

for directing American Splendor

- 2004: Zach Braff

for directing Garden State

- 2005: Paul Haggis

for directing Crash

- 2006: Jonathan Dayton and Valerie Faris

for directing Little Miss Sunshine

- 2007: Sarah Polley

for directing Away From Her

- 2008: Tomas Alfredson

for directing Let the Right One In
