= African-American Film Critics Association Awards 2005 =

Awards ceremony for film in 2005

3rd African-American Film Critics Association Awards
- Date: December 30, 2005

Highlights
- Best Picture: Crash

The 3rd African-American Film Critics Association Awards, honoring the best in filmmaking of 2005, were given on 30 December 2005.

== Top 10 Films ==
1. Crash
2. The Constant Gardener
3. Good Night, and Good Luck.
4. Brokeback Mountain
5. Syriana
6. Walk the Line
7. Hustle & Flow
8. Capote
9. Batman Begins
10. North Country

== Winners ==
- Achievement Honor:
  - John Singleton; producer of Hustle & Flow
- Best Actor:
  - Terrence Howard - Hustle & Flow
- Best Actress:
  - Felicity Huffman - Transamerica
