= New York Film Critics Online Awards 2005 =

2005 edition of the New York Film Critics Online Awards

5th New York Film Critics Online Awards

December 11, 2005

The 5th New York Film Critics Online Awards, honoring the best in filmmaking in 2005, were given on 11 December 2005.

== Top 9 Films ==
(in alphabetical order)

- Brokeback Mountain
- Capote
- The Constant Gardener
- Crash
- Good Night, and Good Luck
- La meglio gioventù (The Best of Youth)
- Munich
- The Squid and the Whale
- Syriana

== Winners ==
- Best Actor: Philip Seymour Hoffman – Capote
- Best Actress: Keira Knightley – Pride & Prejudice
- Best Animated Film: Wallace & Gromit: The Curse of the Were-Rabbit
- Best Cinematography: March of the Penguins – Laurent Chalet and Jérôme Maison
- Best Debut Director: Paul Haggis – Crash
- Best Director: Fernando Meirelles – The Constant Gardener
- Best Documentary: Grizzly Man
- Best Film: The Squid and the Whale
- Best Foreign Language Film: Der Untergang (Downfall) • Austria/Germany/Italy
- Best Screenplay: Crash – Paul Haggis
- Best Supporting Actor: Oliver Platt – Casanova
- Best Supporting Actress: Amy Adams – Junebug
- Breakthrough Performer: Terrence Howard – Crash, Four Brothers, Get Rich or Die Tryin', and Hustle & Flow

Preceded by NYFCO Awards 2004 (4th)	New York Film Critics Online Awards; 2005	Succeeded by NYFCO Awards 2006 (6th)
