= Art Directors Guild Awards 2005 =

Annual US film and television awards ceremony

10th Art Directors Guild Awards
- Date: February 11, 2006

The 10th Art Directors Guild Awards, given on 11 February 2006, honored the best art directors of 2005. The event took place in Beverly Hills, California.

== Winners ==
=== Film ===
==== Contemporary ====
David J. Bomba – Walk the Line

- Laurence Bennett – Crash
- Dennis Gassner – Jarhead
- Mark Teldesley – The Constant Gardener
- Dan Weil – Syriana

==== Period or Fantasy ====
John Myhre – Memoirs of a Geisha

- Jim D. Bissell – Good Night, and Good Luck.
- Nathan Crowley – Batman Begins
- Grant Major – King Kong
- Alex McDowell – Charlie and the Chocolate Factory

=== Television ===
- Single Camera Series:
  - Joseph Bennett – Rome for Episode 1
- Multiple Camera Series:
  - John Sabato – Mad TV for Episode 1106
- Television Movie or Miniseries:
  - Stuart Wurtzel – Empire Falls
- Awards Show, Variety or Music Special, or Documentary:
  - Roy Christopher – 77th Academy Awards
- Commercial, Promo or PSA:
  - Jeremy Reed – Bud Light
