= Online Film Critics Society Awards 2005 =

9th Online Film Critics Society Awards

9th Online Film Critics Society Awards

January 16, 2006

Best Film:
A History of Violence

The 9th Online Film Critics Society Awards, honoring the best in film for 2005, were given on 16 January 2006.

== Winners and nominees ==
=== Best Picture ===
A History of Violence

- Brokeback Mountain
- Crash
- Good Night, and Good Luck.
- Munich

=== Best Director ===
David Cronenberg – A History of Violence

- George Clooney – Good Night, and Good Luck.
- Peter Jackson – King Kong
- Ang Lee – Brokeback Mountain
- Steven Spielberg – Munich

=== Best Actor ===
Philip Seymour Hoffman – Capote

- Terrence Howard – Hustle & Flow
- Heath Ledger – Brokeback Mountain
- Joaquin Phoenix – Walk the Line
- David Strathairn – Good Night, and Good Luck.

=== Best Actress ===
Reese Witherspoon – Walk the Line

- Joan Allen – The Upside of Anger
- Felicity Huffman – Transamerica
- Keira Knightley – Pride & Prejudice
- Naomi Watts – King Kong

=== Best Supporting Actor ===
Mickey Rourke – Sin City

- Matt Dillon – Crash
- Paul Giamatti – Cinderella Man
- Jake Gyllenhaal – Brokeback Mountain
- William Hurt – A History of Violence

=== Best Supporting Actress ===
Maria Bello – A History of Violence

- Amy Adams – Junebug
- Catherine Keener – Capote
- Rachel Weisz – The Constant Gardener
- Michelle Williams – Brokeback Mountain

=== Best Original Screenplay ===
Good Night, and Good Luck. – George Clooney and Grant Heslov

- Broken Flowers – Jim Jarmusch
- Crash – Paul Haggis and Bobby Moresco
- Match Point – Woody Allen
- The Squid and the Whale – Noah Baumbach

=== Best Adapted Screenplay ===
Brokeback Mountain – Larry McMurtry and Diana Ossana

- Capote – Dan Futterman
- The Constant Gardener – Jeffrey Caine
- A History of Violence – Josh Olson
- Munich – Tony Kushner and Eric Roth

=== Best Foreign Language Film ===
Downfall

- 2046
- Caché
- Kung Fu Hustle
- Oldboy

=== Best Documentary ===
Grizzly Man

- The Aristocrats
- Enron: The Smartest Guys in the Room
- March of the Penguins
- Murderball

=== Best Animated Feature ===
Wallace & Gromit: The Curse of the Were-Rabbit

- Corpse Bride
- Howl's Moving Castle
- Madagascar
- Robots

=== Best Cinematography ===
Sin City – Robert Rodriguez

- 2046 – Christopher Doyle, Pung-Leung Kwan and Lai Yiu-fai
- Brokeback Mountain – Rodrigo Prieto
- Good Night, and Good Luck. – Robert Elswit
- The New World – Emmanuel Lubezki

=== Best Editing ===
Sin City – Robert Rodriguez

- The Constant Gardener – Claire Simpson
- Good Night, and Good Luck. – Stephen Mirrione
- A History of Violence – Ronald Sanders
- Munich – Michael Kahn

=== Best Score ===
Brokeback Mountain – Gustavo Santaolalla

- Batman Begins – James Newton Howard and Hans Zimmer
- King Kong – James Newton Howard
- Munich – John Williams
- The New World – James Horner

=== Breakthrough Filmmaker ===
Paul Haggis – Crash

- Judd Apatow – The 40-Year-Old Virgin
- Craig Brewer – Hustle & Flow
- Bennett Miller – Capote
- Joe Wright – Pride & Prejudice

=== Breakthrough Performer ===
Owen Kline – The Squid and the Whale

- Nathan Fillion – Serenity
- Georgie Henley – The Chronicles of Narnia: The Lion, the Witch and the Wardrobe
- Tony Jaa – Ong-Bak: The Thai Warrior
- Q'orianka Kilcher – The New World
