= Washington D.C. Area Film Critics Association Awards 2005 =

4th Washington D.C. Area Film Critics Association Awards

4th WAFCA Awards
- Date: December 12, 2005

Highlights
- Best Film: Munich
- Best Director: Steven Spielberg for Munich
- Best Actor: Philip Seymour Hoffman
- Best Actress: Reese Witherspoon

The 4th Washington D.C. Area Film Critics Association Awards, honoring the best in filmmaking in 2005, were given on December 12, 2005.

== Winners and nominees ==
=== Best Film ===
Munich

- Brokeback Mountain
- Capote
- Crash
- Good Night, and Good Luck.

=== Best Director ===
Steven Spielberg – Munich

- George Clooney – Good Night, and Good Luck.
- Ron Howard – Cinderella Man
- Ang Lee – Brokeback Mountain
- Fernando Meirelles – The Constant Gardener

=== Best Actor ===
Philip Seymour Hoffman – Capote

- Terrence Howard – Hustle & Flow
- Heath Ledger – Brokeback Mountain
- Joaquin Phoenix – Walk the Line
- David Strathairn – Good Night, and Good Luck.

=== Best Actress ===
Reese Witherspoon – Walk the Line

- Joan Allen – The Upside of Anger
- Felicity Huffman – Transamerica
- Keira Knightley – Pride & Prejudice
- Charlize Theron – North Country

=== Best Supporting Actor ===
Paul Giamatti – Cinderella Man

- Matt Dillon – Crash
- Terrence Howard – Crash
- Geoffrey Rush – Munich
- Peter Sarsgaard – Jarhead

=== Best Supporting Actress ===
Amy Adams – Junebug

- Brenda Blethyn – Pride & Prejudice
- Taraji P. Henson – Hustle & Flow
- Catherine Keener – Capote
- Michelle Williams – Brokeback Mountain

=== Best Original Screenplay ===
Paul Haggis and Bobby Moresco – Crash

- George Clooney and Grant Heslov – Good Night, and Good Luck.
- Craig Brewer – Hustle & Flow
- Angus MacLachlan – Junebug
- Noah Baumbach – The Squid and the Whale

=== Best Adapted Screenplay ===
Dan Futterman – Capote

- Larry McMurty and Diana Ossana – Brokeback Mountain
- Arthur Golden, Robin Swicord, and Doug Wright – Memoirs of a Geisha
- Tony Kushner – Munich
- Deborah Moggach – Pride & Prejudice

=== Best Foreign Language Film ===
Kung Fu Hustle

- Innocent Voices
- Paradise Now
- Schultze Gets the Blues
- Turtles Can Fly

=== Best Animated Feature ===
Wallace and Gromit: The Curse of the Were-Rabbit

- Chicken Little
- Corpse Bride
- Madagascar
- Robots

=== Best Documentary ===
Enron: The Smartest Guys in the Room

- Grizzly Man
- Mad Hot Ballroom
- March of the Penguins
- Murderball

=== Best Breakthrough Performance ===
Terrence Howard – Hustle & Flow

- Amy Adams – Junebug
- Q'orianka Kilcher – The New World
- Taryn Manning – Hustle & Flow
- Aishwarya Rai – Bride and Prejudice

=== Best Ensemble ===
Crash

- Good Night, and Good Luck.
- Pride & Prejudice
- Rent
- Sin City

=== Best Art Direction ===
The Chronicles of Narnia: The Lion, the Witch and the Wardrobe

- Charlie and the Chocolate Factory
- Harry Potter and the Goblet of Fire
- Memoirs of a Geisha
- Star Wars: Episode III – Revenge of the Sith
