= Austin Film Critics Association Awards 2005 =

Annual US film awards ceremony

1st AFCA Awards

Best Film:
Crash

The 1st Austin Film Critics Association Awards honored the best in filmmaking for 2005.

== Top 10 Films ==
1. Crash
2. The Squid and the Whale
3. Sin City
4. Munich
5. Brokeback Mountain
6. Hustle & Flow
7. Capote
8. Oldboy
9. Syriana
10. Good Night, and Good Luck.

== Winners ==
- Best Film:
  - Crash
- Best Director:
  - Paul Haggis – Crash
- Best Actor:
  - Philip Seymour Hoffman – Capote
- Best Actress:
  - Reese Witherspoon – Walk the Line
- Best Supporting Actor:
  - William Hurt – A History of Violence
- Best Supporting Actress:
  - Laura Linney – The Squid and the Whale
- Best Original Screenplay:
  - The Squid and the Whale – Noah Baumbach
- Best Adapted Screenplay:
  - Brokeback Mountain – Larry McMurtry and Diana Ossana
- Best Foreign Language Film:
  - Oldboy • South Korea
- Best Documentary:
  - Murderball
- Best Animated Film:
  - Sin City
- Breakthrough Artist Award:
  - Terrence Howard – Crash and Hustle & Flow
- Most Promising Filmmaker:
  - Noah Baumbach – The Squid and the Whale
- Austin Film Award:
  - Sin City
