= Vancouver Film Critics Circle Awards 2005 =

Annual Canadian film awards ceremony

6th Vancouver Film Critics Circle Awards

February 7, 2006

Best Film:
Brokeback Mountain

Best Canadian Film:
C.R.A.Z.Y.

The 6th Vancouver Film Critics Circle Awards, honoring the best in filmmaking in 2005, were given on 7 February 2006.

== Winners ==
=== International ===
- Best Actor:
  - Philip Seymour Hoffman - Capote
- Best Actress:
  - Felicity Huffman - Transamerica
- Best Director:
  - Ang Lee - Brokeback Mountain
- Best Film:
  - Brokeback Mountain
- Best Foreign Language Film:
  - Paradise Now, Palestine
- Best Supporting Actor:
  - Terrence Howard - Crash
- Best Supporting Actress:
  - Amy Adams - Junebug

=== Canadian ===
- Best Actor:
  - Marc-André Grondin - C.R.A.Z.Y.
- Best Actress:
  - Lisa Ray - Water
- Best British Columbian Film:
  - It's All Gone Pete Tong
- Best Director:
  - Deepa Mehta - Water
- Best Film:
  - C.R.A.Z.Y.
- Best Supporting Actor:
  - Michel Côté - C.R.A.Z.Y.
- Best Supporting Actress:
  - Danielle Proulx - C.R.A.Z.Y.

=== Achievement Award for Contribution to B.C. Film ===
- Babs Chula
- Larry Kent
- Alan Scarfe
