= 11th Critics' Choice Awards =

2006 US film awards

- Date: January 9, 2006
- Official website: www.criticschoice.com

Highlights
- Best Film: Brokeback Mountain

The 11th Critics' Choice Awards were presented on January 9, 2006, honoring the finest achievements of 2005 filmmaking. The ceremony was held at the Santa Monica Civic Auditorium in Santa Monica, California.

== Top 10 films ==
(in alphabetical order)

- Brokeback Mountain
- Capote
- Cinderella Man
- The Constant Gardener
- Crash
- Good Night, and Good Luck
- King Kong
- Memoirs of a Geisha
- Munich
- Walk the Line

== Winners and nominees ==
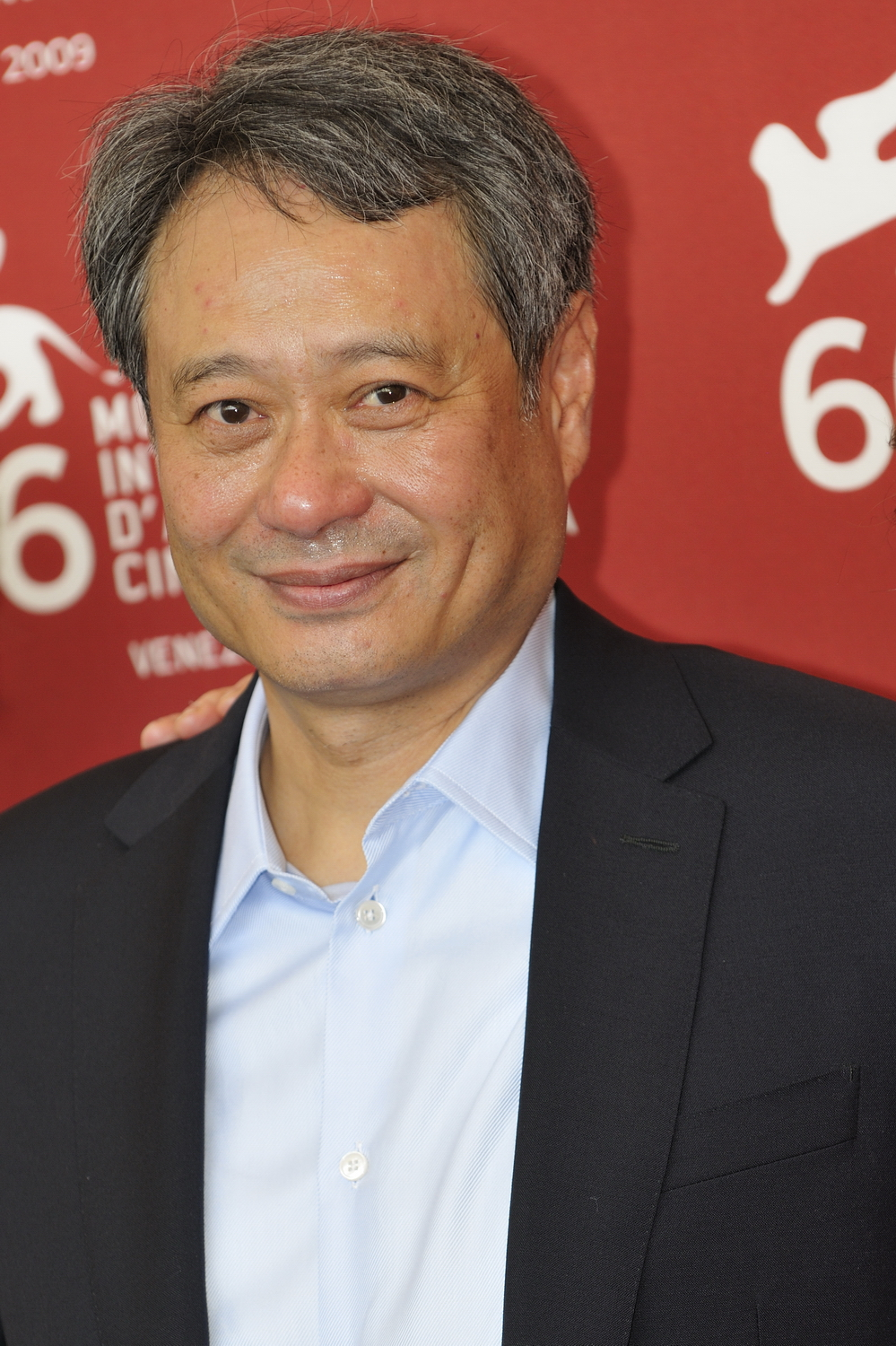
Ang Lee, Best Director winner

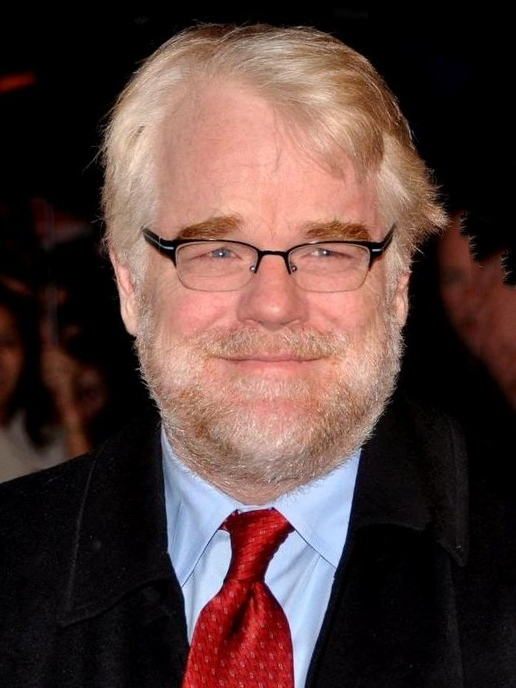
Philip Seymour Hoffman, Best Actor winner

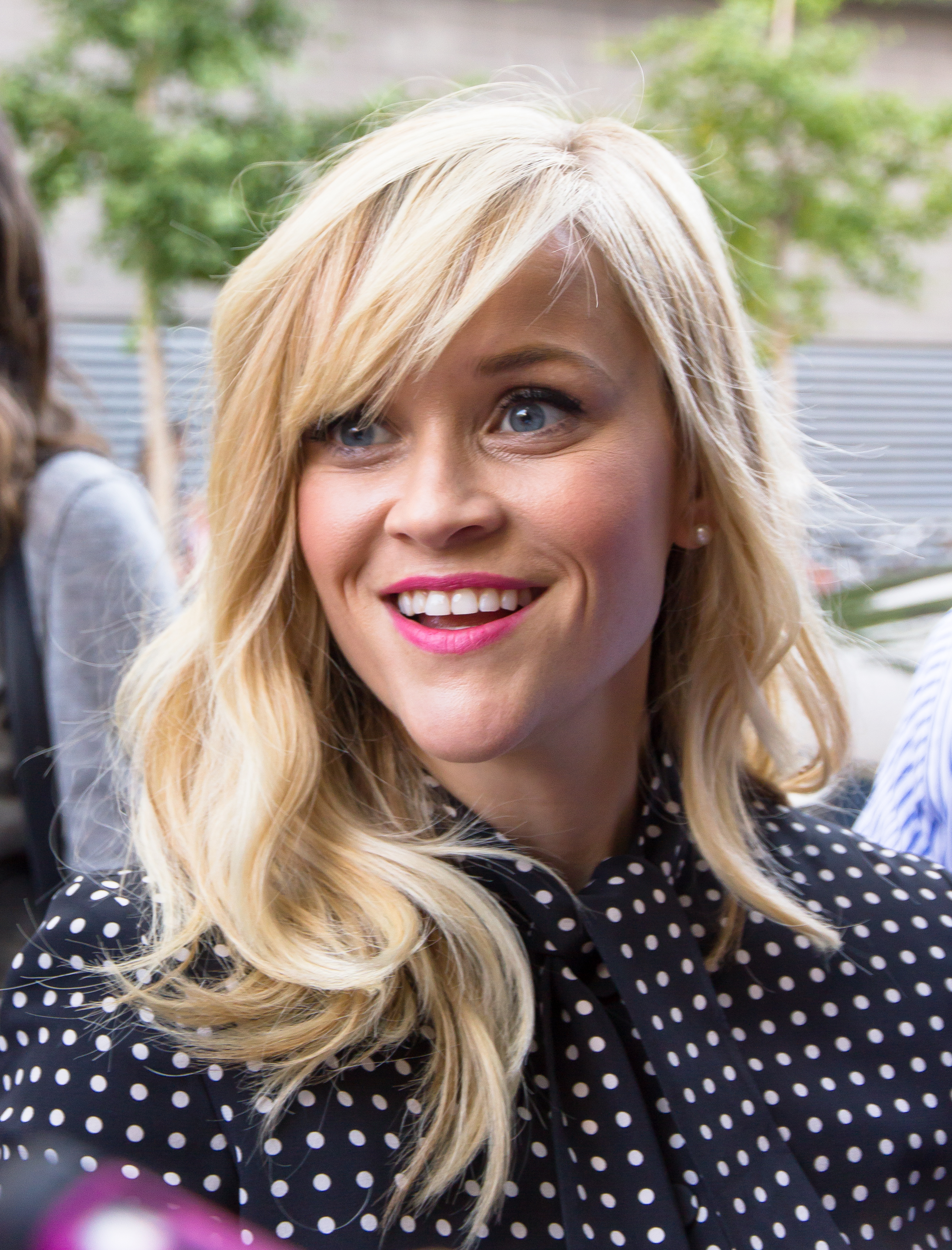
Reese Witherspoon, Best Actress winner

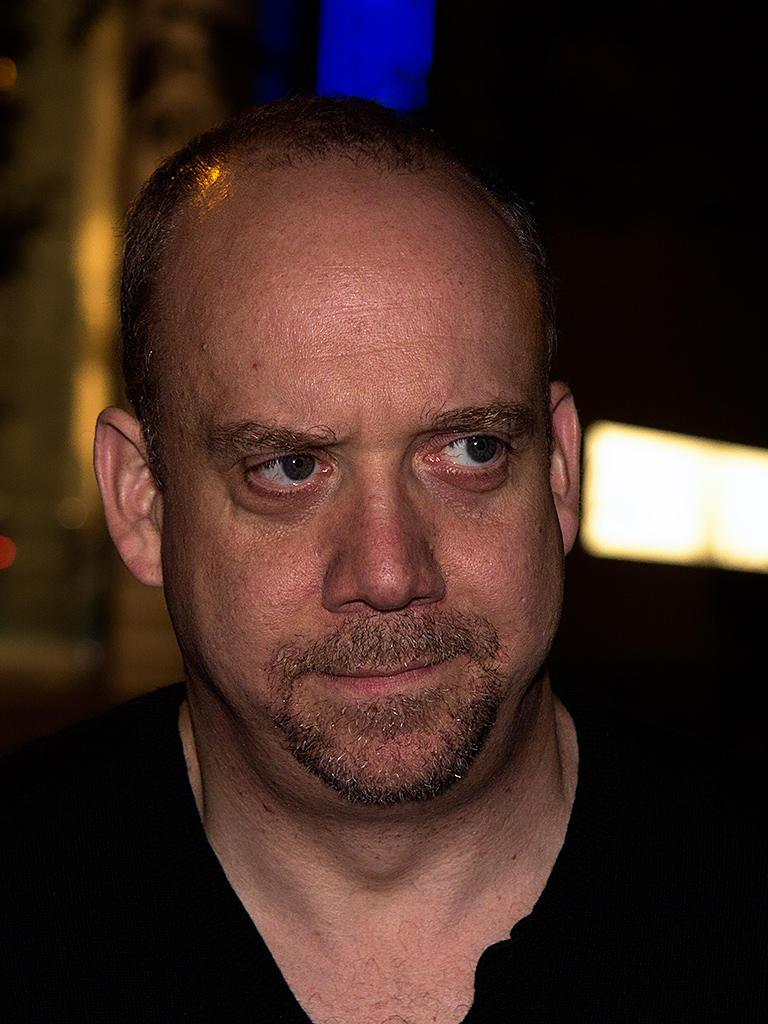
Paul Giamatti, Best Supporting Actor winner

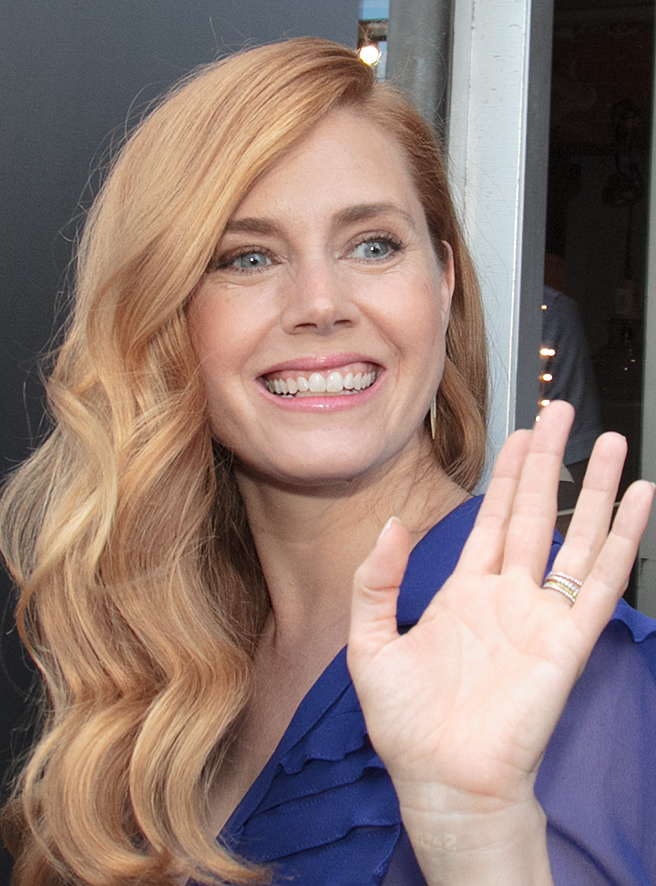
Amy Adams, Best Supporting Actress co-winner

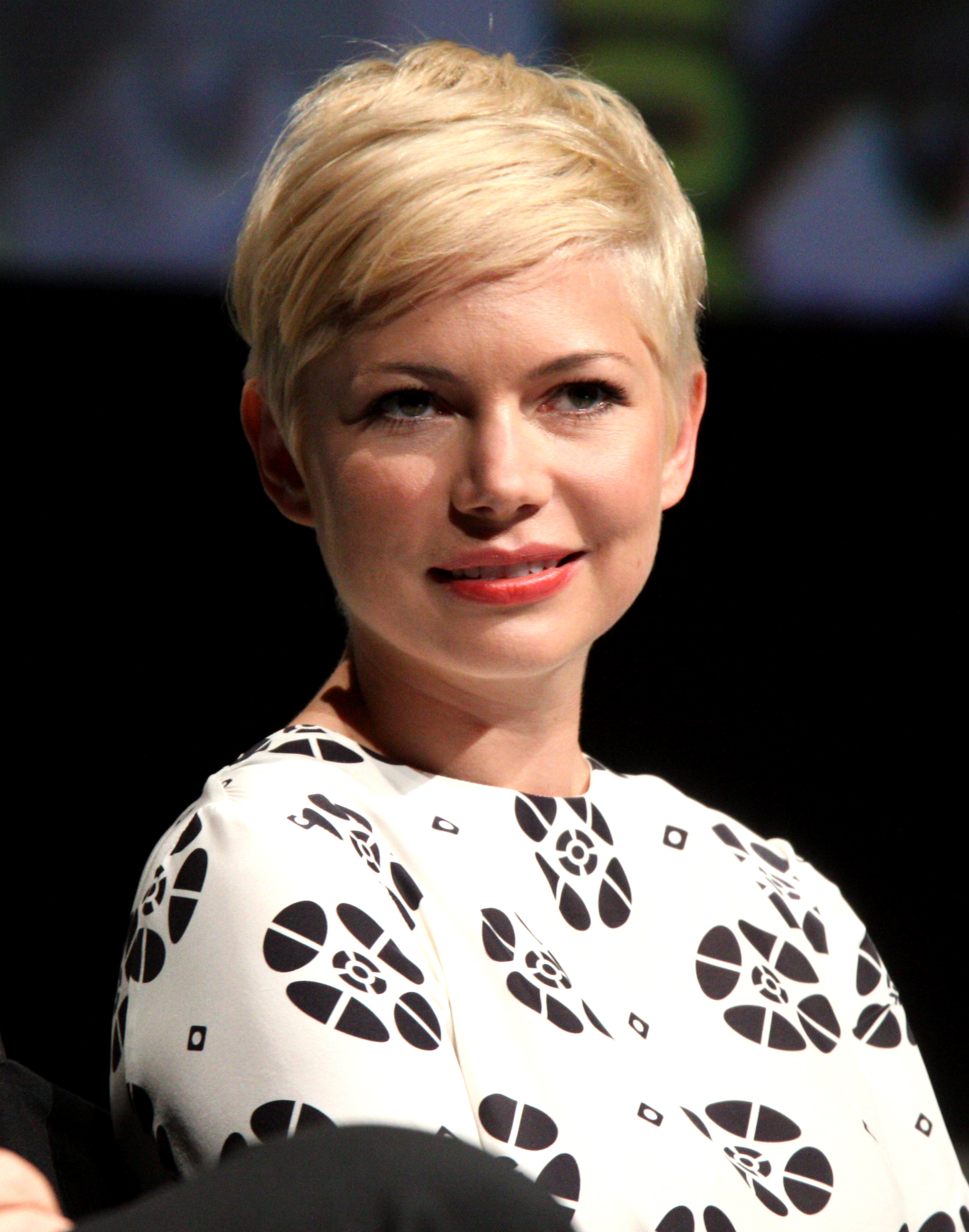
Michelle Williams, Best Supporting Actress co-winner

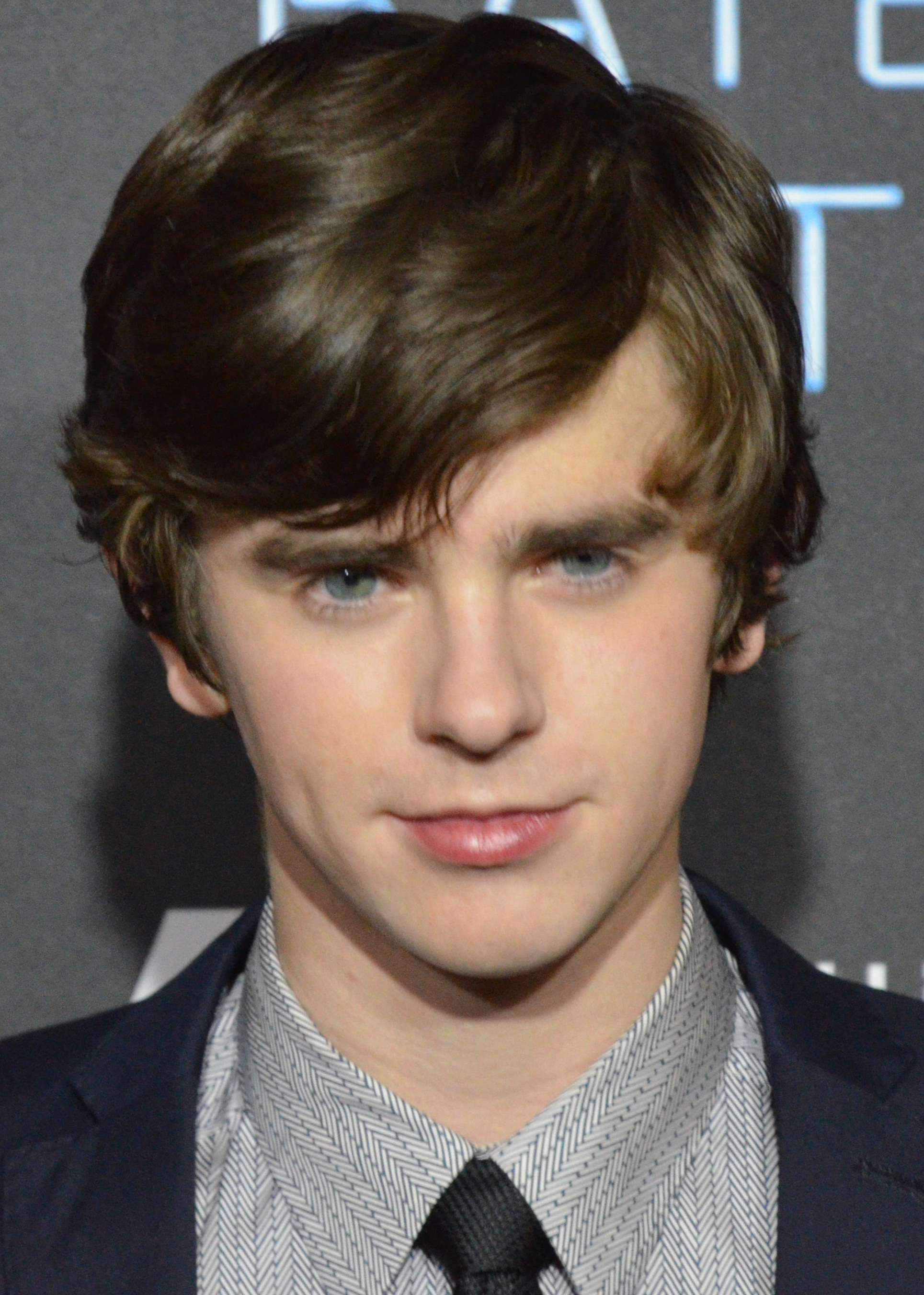
Freddie Highmore, Best Young Actor winner

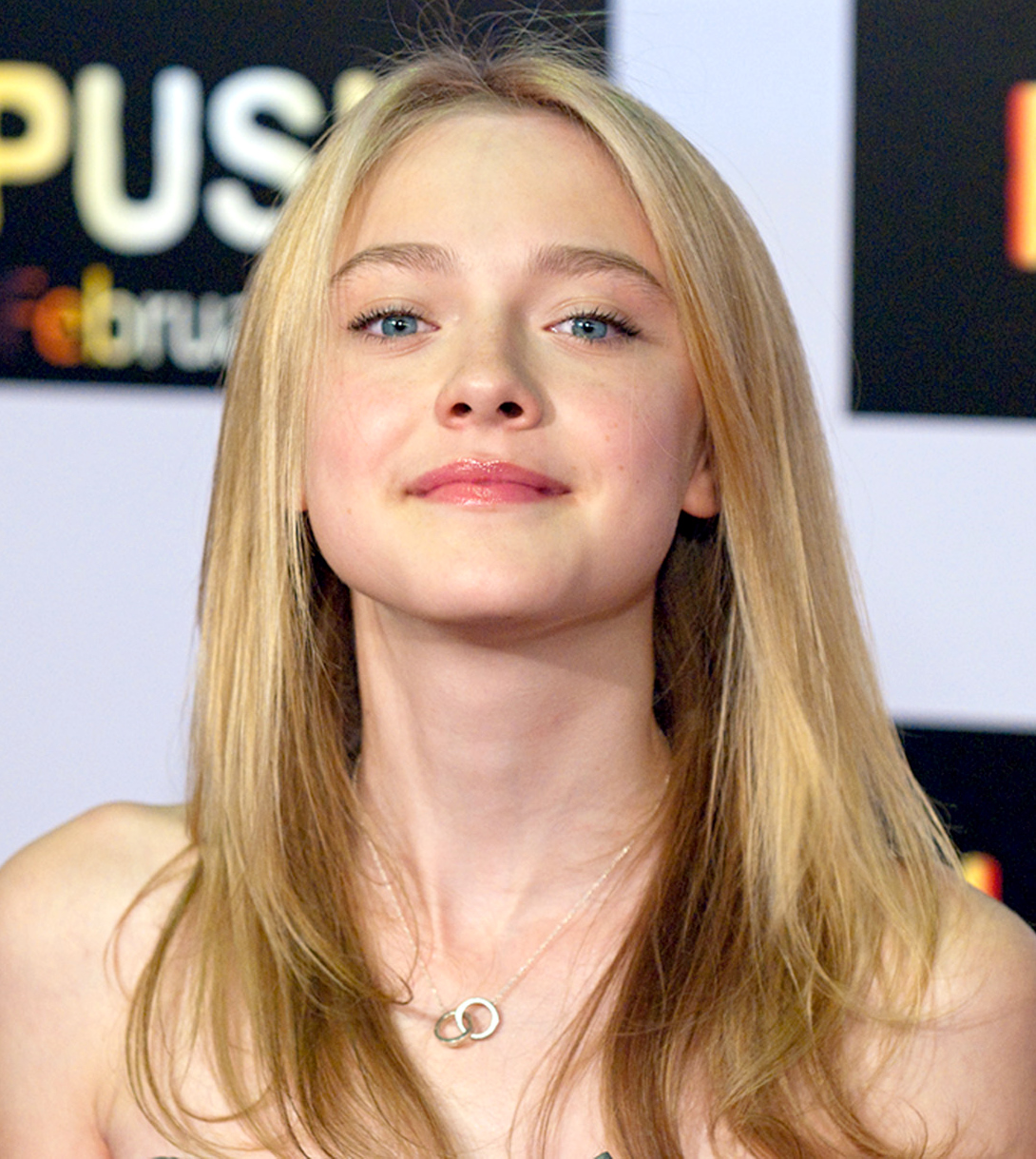
Dakota Fanning, Best Young Actress winner

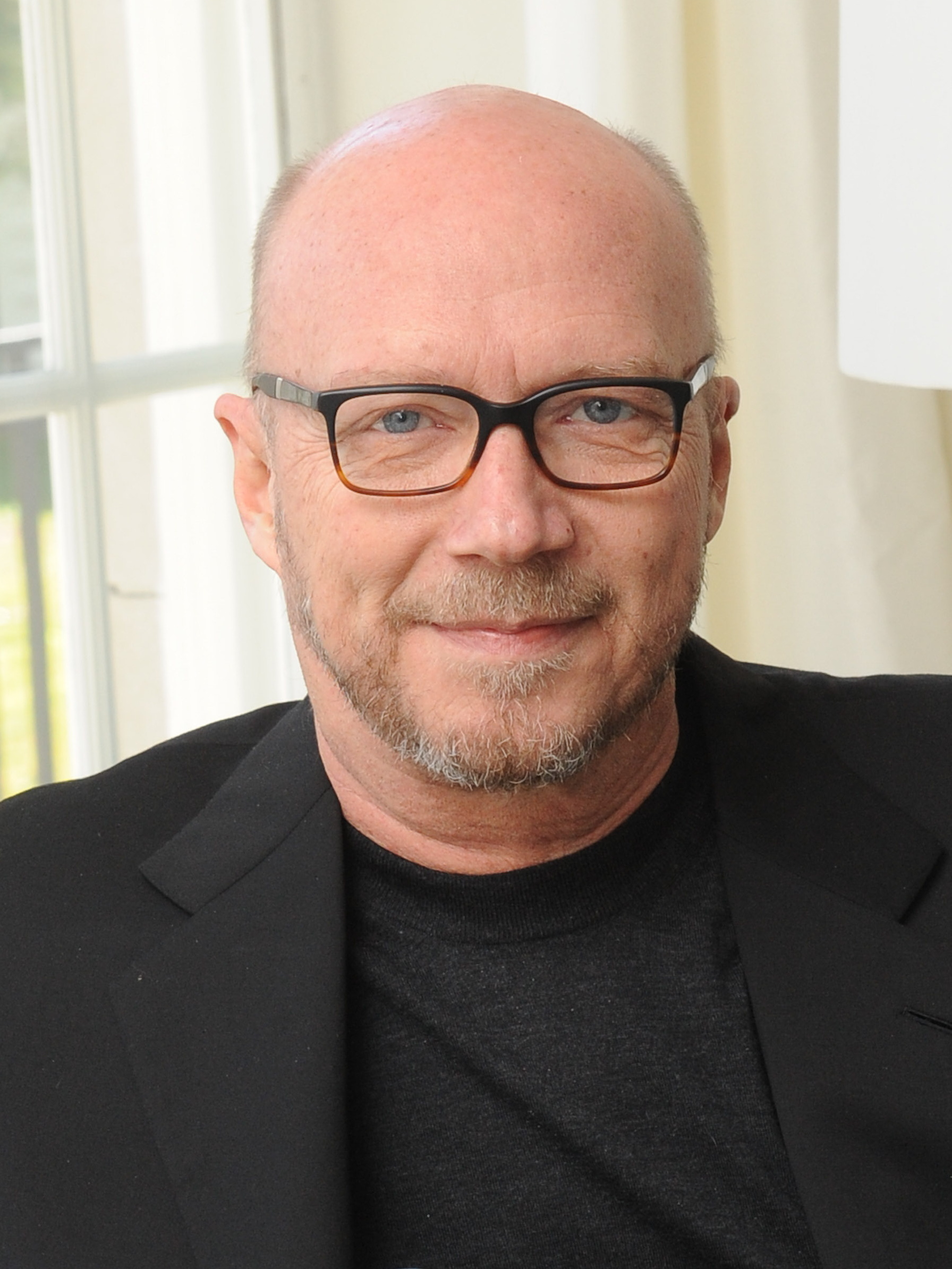
Paul Haggis, Best Writer co-winner

| Best Picture Brokeback Mountain: Capote; Cinderella Man; The Constant Gardener; Crash; Good Night, and Good Luck; King Kong; Memoirs of a Geisha; Munich; Walk the Line | Best Director Ang Lee – Brokeback Mountain: George Clooney – Good Night, and Good Luck; Paul Haggis – Crash; Ron Howard – Cinderella Man; Peter Jackson – King Kong; Steven Spielberg – Munich |
| Best Actor Philip Seymour Hoffman – Capote as Truman Capote: Russell Crowe – Cinderella Man as James J. Braddock; Terrence Howard – Hustle & Flow as DJay; Heath Ledger – Brokeback Mountain as Ennis Del Mar; Joaquin Phoenix – Walk the Line as Johnny Cash; David Strathairn – Good Night, and Good Luck as Edward R. Murrow | Best Actress Reese Witherspoon – Walk the Line as June Carter Cash: Joan Allen – The Upside of Anger as Terry Wolfmeyer; Judi Dench – Mrs Henderson Presents as Laura Henderson; Felicity Huffman – Transamerica as Sabrina "Bree" Osbourne; Keira Knightley – Pride & Prejudice as Elizabeth Bennet; Charlize Theron – North Country as Josey Aimes |
| Best Supporting Actor Paul Giamatti – Cinderella Man as Joe Gould: George Clooney – Syriana as Bob Barnes; Kevin Costner – The Upside of Anger as Denny Davies; Matt Dillon – Crash as Officer John Ryan; Jake Gyllenhaal – Brokeback Mountain as Jack Twist; Terrence Howard – Crash as Cameron Thayer | Best Supporting Actress Amy Adams – Junebug as Ashley Johnsten (TIE); Michelle Williams – Brokeback Mountain as Alma Beers Del Mar (TIE): Maria Bello – A History of Violence as Edie Stall; Catherine Keener – Capote as Nelle Harper Lee; Frances McDormand – North Country as Glory Dodge; Rachel Weisz – The Constant Gardener as Tessa Abbott-Quayle |
| Best Young Actor Freddie Highmore – Charlie and the Chocolate Factory as Charlie Bucket: Jesse Eisenberg – The Squid and the Whale as Walt Berkman; Alex Etel – Millions as Damian Cunningham; Owen Kline – The Squid and the Whale as Frank Berkman; Daniel Radcliffe – Harry Potter and the Goblet of Fire as Harry Potter | Best Young Actress Dakota Fanning – War of the Worlds as Rachel Ferrier: Flora Cross – Bee Season as Eliza; Georgie Henley – The Chronicles of Narnia: The Lion, the Witch and the Wardrobe as Lucy Pevensie; Q'orianka Kilcher – The New World as Pocahontas; Emma Watson – Harry Potter and the Goblet of Fire as Hermione Granger |
| Best Acting Ensemble Crash: Good Night, and Good Luck; Rent; Sin City; Syriana | Best Writer Crash – Paul Haggis and Bobby Moresco: Brokeback Mountain – Larry McMurtry and Diana Ossana; Capote – Dan Futterman; Good Night, and Good Luck – George Clooney and Grant Heslov; The Squid and the Whale – Noah Baumbach |
| Best Animated Feature Wallace & Gromit: The Curse of the Were-Rabbit: Chicken Little; Corpse Bride; Howl's Moving Castle; Madagascar | Best Documentary Feature March of the Penguins: Enron: The Smartest Guys in the Room; Grizzly Man; Mad Hot Ballroom; Murderball |
| Best Family Film The Chronicles of Narnia: The Lion, the Witch and the Wardrobe: Charlie and the Chocolate Factory; Dreamer; Harry Potter and the Goblet of Fire | Best Foreign Language Film Kung Fu Hustle • China / Hong Kong: 2046 • China / France / Germany / Hong Kong; Caché • France; Oldboy • South Korea; Paradise Now • Palestine Authority |
| Best Composer Memoirs of a Geisha – John Williams: Brokeback Mountain – Gustavo Santaolalla; Elizabethtown – Nancy Wilson; The New World – James Horner | Best Song "Hustle & Flow" – Hustle & Flow: "A Love That Will Never Grow Old" – Brokeback Mountain; "Same in Any Language" – Elizabethtown; "Seasons of Love" – Rent; "Travelin' Thru" – Transamerica |
| Best Comedy Movie The 40-Year-Old Virgin: Kiss Kiss Bang Bang; Mrs Henderson Presents; The Producers; Wedding Crashers | Best Soundtrack Walk the Line: Elizabethtown; Memoirs of a Geisha; The Producers; Rent |

=== Freedom Award ===
George Clooney – Good Night, and Good Luck

=== Best Picture Made for Television ===
Into the West

- No Direction Home
- Rome (for episode "The Stolen Eagle")
- Warm Springs

=== Distinguished Achievement in Performing Arts Award ===
King Kong – King Kong

== Statistics ==
| Nominations | Film |
|---|---|
| 8 | Brokeback Mountain |
| 6 | Crash |
| 5 | Good Night, and Good Luck |
| 4 | Capote |
| 4 | Cinderella Man |
| 4 | Walk the Line |
| 3 | Elizabethtown |
| 3 | Harry Potter and the Goblet of Fire |
| 3 | Memoirs of a Geisha |
| 3 | Rent |
| 3 | The Squid and the Whale |
| 2 | Charlie and the Chocolate Factory |
| 2 | The Chronicles of Narnia: The Lion, the Witch and the Wardrobe |
| 2 | The Constant Gardener |
| 2 | Hustle & Flow |
| 2 | King Kong |
| 2 | Mrs Henderson Presents |
| 2 | Munich |
| 2 | The New World |
| 2 | North Country |
| 2 | The Producers |
| 2 | Syriana |
| 2 | Transamerica |
| 2 | The Upside of Anger |

| Wins | Film |
|---|---|
| 3 | Brokeback Mountain |
| 2 | Crash |
| 2 | Walk the Line |
