= List of accolades received by Memoirs of a Geisha =

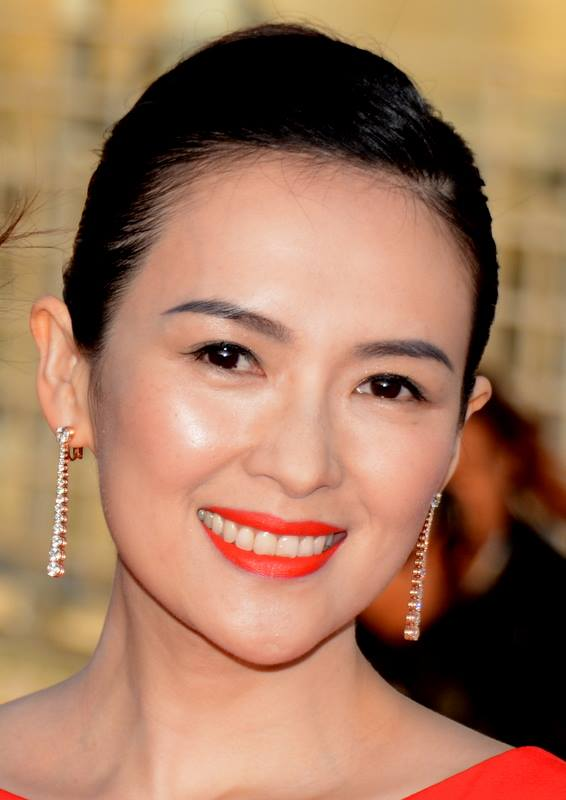
- Zhang Ziyi received several Best Actress nominations for her portrayal of the titular geisha.
Awards and nominations
Award	Won	Nominated
Academy Awards	3	6
American Society of Cinematographers	1	1
Art Directors Guild	1	1
Australian Cinematographers Society	1	1
Australian Film Institute	1	1
British Academy Film Awards	2	6
British Society of Cinematographers	0	1
California on Location Awards	2	2
Casting Society of America	0	1
Chicago Film Critics Association	0	1
Cinema Audio Society Awards	0	1
Costume Designers Guild	1	1
Critics' Choice Movie Award	1	3
Gold Derby Film Awards	1	5
Golden Globe Awards	1	2
Golden Reel Awards	1	3
GoldSpirit Awards	2	6
Grammy Awards	1	1
Hollywood Film Festival	2	2
IFMCA Awards	2	2
MTV Movie Awards	0	1
NAACP Image Awards	0	1
Nastro d'Argento	1	1
National Board of Review	2	2
New York Film Critics Circle	0	1
Satellite Awards	1	9
Screen Actors Guild Awards	0	1
Visual Effects Society	0	1
Young Artist Award	1	2
- Total number of wins and nominations
Totals	28	66
- References

Memoirs of a Geisha is a 2005 drama film directed by Rob Marshall and written by Robin Swicord. The screenplay is based on the novel of the same name by Arthur Golden, which follows the fictional story of Chiyo Sakamoto (Suzuka Ohgo and Zhang Ziyi), who, as a young girl, leaves behind her fishing village and becomes Sayuri Nitta, a celebrated geisha working in Kyoto, Japan, before and after World War II. The film also stars Ken Watanabe as Sayuri's love interest, Gong Li as her rival, and Michelle Yeoh as her mentor. It had a limited theatrical release in the United States from December 9, 2005, before it went on a wide release on December 23, 2005. Memoirs of a Geisha grossed a worldwide box office total of over $162 million, against an estimated budget of $85 million.

Memoirs of a Geisha garnered various awards and nominations following its release, with nominations ranging from recognition of the cast's acting performances, particularly those of Zhang and Li, to its costume design, cinematography, and John Williams' score. The film received six nominations at the 78th Academy Awards and won three at the ceremony. Production designer John Myhre won the Art Directors Guild Award for Excellence in Production Design for a Period Film for his work on the film, while cinematographer Dion Beebe won three awards from the American Society of Cinematographers, Australian Cinematographers Society, and the Australian Film Institute. At the 59th British Academy Film Awards, Memoirs of a Geisha won two awards from six nominations. The location crew were recognised at the California on Location Awards, where they won two awards. Memoirs of a Geisha received three nominations at the 11th Critics' Choice Awards; Williams won Best Composer.

The film earned five nominations from the Gold Derby Film Awards, with costume designer Colleen Atwood going on to win Best Costume Design. She also received the Costume Designers Guild Award for Excellence in Period Film. The sound and dialogue artists won one award out of three nominations from the Golden Reel Awards. At the 63rd Golden Globe Awards, Zhang earned a nomination for Best Actress in a Drama Motion Picture, while Williams won Best Original Score. Williams would go on to win two awards from a total of six nominations for his score at the GoldSpirit Awards, as well as the Grammy Award for Best Score Soundtrack for Visual Media and two IFMCA Awards. Producers Lucy Fisher and Douglas Wick were honored at the 2005 Hollywood Film Festival, along with Atwood, who was named Costume Designer of the Year.

Film editor Pietro Scalia was awarded the Special Silver Ribbon from the Nastro d'Argento. Memoirs of a Geisha was named as one of the Top Ten Films at the 2005 National Board of Review Awards. Gong also won the National Board of Review Award for Best Supporting Actress accolade. The film received a total of nine nominations at the 10th Satellite Awards, including Best Film. Swicord went on to win Best Adapted Screenplay. Zhang's performance earned her nominations for the NAACP Image Award for Outstanding Actress in a Motion Picture, New York Film Critics Circle Award for Best Actress, and the Screen Actors Guild Award for Outstanding Performance by a Female Actor in a Leading Role. She was also nominated for Sexiest Performance at the 2006 MTV Movie Awards. At the 27th Young Artist Awards, Suzuka Ohgo won Best Supporting Young Actress.

== Accolades ==
Award	Date of ceremony	Category	Recipient(s)	Result	Ref.
Academy Awards	March 5, 2006	Best Art Direction	John Myhre, Gretchen Rau	Won	
Academy Awards	March 5, 2006	Best Cinematography	Dion Beebe	Won	
Academy Awards	March 5, 2006	Best Costume Design	Colleen Atwood	Won	
Academy Awards	March 5, 2006	Best Original Score	John Williams	Nominated	
Academy Awards	March 5, 2006	Best Sound	Kevin O'Connell, Greg P. Russell, Rick Kline, John Pritchett	Nominated	
Academy Awards	March 5, 2006	Best Sound Editing	Wylie Stateman	Nominated	
American Society of Cinematographers	February 26, 2006	Outstanding Achievement in Cinematography	Dion Beebe	Won	
Art Directors Guild	February 11, 2006	Excellence in Production Design for a Period Film	John Myhre	Won	
Australian Cinematographers Society	2006	International Award	Dion Beebe	Won	
Australian Film Institute	December 6–7, 2006	Excellence in Filmmaking	Dion Beebe	Won	
British Academy Film Awards	February 19, 2006	Best Actress	Zhang Ziyi	Nominated	
British Academy Film Awards	February 19, 2006	Best Cinematography	Dion Beebe	Won	
British Academy Film Awards	February 19, 2006	Best Costume Design	Colleen Atwood	Won	
British Academy Film Awards	February 19, 2006	Best Film Music	John Williams	Won	
British Academy Film Awards	February 19, 2006	Best Makeup and Hair	Kate Biscoe, Lyndell Quiyou, Kelvin R. Trahan, Noriko Watanabe	Nominated	
British Academy Film Awards	February 19, 2006	Best Production Design	John Myhre	Nominated	
British Society of Cinematographers	July 15, 2007	Best Cinematography in a Theatrical Feature Film	Dion Beebe	Nominated	
California on Location Awards	2005	Location Professional of the Year	Mike Fantasia	Won	
California on Location Awards	2005	Production Company/Location Team of the Year	^{See below}	Won	
Casting Society of America	November 1, 2006	Best Casting for a Drama Feature Film	Francine Maisler	Nominated	
Chicago Film Critics Association	January 9, 2005	Best Original Score	John Williams	Nominated	
Cinema Audio Society Awards	February 25, 2006	Outstanding Achievement in Sound Mixing for a Motion Picture	Kevin O'Connell, Greg P. Russell, Rick Kline, John Pritchett	Nominated	
Costume Designers Guild	February 25, 2006	Excellence in Period Film	Colleen Atwood	Won	
Critics' Choice Movie Award	January 9, 2006	Best Composer	John Williams	Won	
Critics' Choice Movie Award	January 9, 2006	Best Picture	Memoirs of a Geisha	Nominated	
Critics' Choice Movie Award	January 9, 2006	Best Soundtrack	Memoirs of a Geisha	Nominated	
Gold Derby Film Awards	2005	Best Art Direction	John Myhre, Gretchen Rau	Nominated	
Gold Derby Film Awards	2005	Best Cinematography	Dion Beebe	Nominated	
Gold Derby Film Awards	2005	Best Costume Design	Colleen Atwood	Won	
Gold Derby Film Awards	2005	Best Makeup/Hair	Kate Biscoe	Nominated	
Gold Derby Film Awards	2005	Best Original Score	John Williams	Nominated	
Golden Globe Awards	January 16, 2006	Best Original Score	John Williams	Won	
Golden Globe Awards	January 16, 2006	Best Actress in a Drama Motion Picture	Zhang Ziyi	Nominated	
Golden Reel Awards	March 4, 2006	Best Sound Editing in Feature Film – Dialogue & ADR	^{See below}	Won	
Golden Reel Awards	March 4, 2006	Best Sound Editing in Feature Film – Music	Ramiro Belgardt, Kenneth Karman, Kenneth Wannberg	Nominated	
Golden Reel Awards	March 4, 2006	Best Sound Editing in Feature Film – Sound Effects & Foley	^{See below}	Nominated	
GoldSpirit Awards	2005	Best Drama Score	John Williams	Won	
GoldSpirit Awards	2005	Best Drama Theme	"Sayuri's Theme and End Credits"	Nominated	
GoldSpirit Awards	2005	Best Drama Theme	"Becoming a Geisha"	Nominated	
GoldSpirit Awards	2005	Best Romantic Theme	"The Chairman's Waltz"	Nominated	
GoldSpirit Awards	2005	Best Score	John Williams	Won	
GoldSpirit Awards	2005	Best Theme	"Becoming a Geisha"	Nominated	
Grammy Award	February 11, 2007	Best Score Soundtrack for Visual Media	John Williams	Won	
Hollywood Film Festival	October 18–24, 2005	Costume Designer of the Year	Colleen Atwood	Won	
Hollywood Film Festival	October 18–24, 2005	Producer of the Year	Lucy Fisher and Douglas Wick	Won	
IFMCA Awards	2005	Film Score of the Year	Memoirs of a Geisha – John Williams	Won	
IFMCA Awards	2005	Best Original Score for a Drama Film	Memoirs of a Geisha – John Williams	Won	
MTV Movie Awards	June 3, 2006	Sexiest Performance	Zhang Ziyi	Nominated	
NAACP Image Awards	February 26, 2006	Outstanding Actress in a Motion Picture	Zhang Ziyi	Nominated	
Nastro d'Argento	February 7, 2006	Special Silver Ribbon	Pietro Scalia	Won	
National Board of Review	January 10, 2006	Best Supporting Actress	Gong Li	Won	
National Board of Review	January 10, 2006	Top Ten Films	Memoirs of a Geisha	Won	
New York Film Critics Circle	December 12, 2005	Best Actress	Zhang Ziyi (also for 2046)	Nominated	
Satellite Awards	December 17, 2005	Best Actress	Zhang Ziyi	Nominated	
Satellite Awards	December 17, 2005	Best Adapted Screenplay	Robin Swicord	Won	
Satellite Awards	December 17, 2005	Best Art Direction and Production Design	John Myhre	Nominated	
Satellite Awards	December 17, 2005	Best Cinematography	Dion Beebe	Nominated	
Satellite Awards	December 17, 2005	Best Costume Design	Colleen Atwood	Nominated	
Satellite Awards	December 17, 2005	Best Director	Rob Marshall	Nominated	
Satellite Awards	December 17, 2005	Best Film	Memoirs of a Geisha	Nominated	
Satellite Awards	December 17, 2005	Best Original Score	John Williams	Nominated	
Satellite Awards	December 17, 2005	Best Supporting Actress	Gong Li	Nominated	
Screen Actors Guild Award	January 29, 2006	Outstanding Performance by a Female Actor in a Leading Role	Zhang Ziyi	Nominated	
Visual Effects Society	February 15, 2006	Outstanding Supporting Visual Effects in a Feature Motion Picture	Robert Stromberg, Julia Frey, Paul Graff, Adam Watkins	Nominated	
Young Artist Award	March 25, 2006	Best Supporting Young Actress	Suzuka Ohgo	Won	
Young Artist Award	March 25, 2006	Best Family Drama Feature Film	Memoirs of a Geisha	Nominated	

== Notes ==
^2005 California on Location Awards nominees for "Best Production Company or Location Team of the Year": Mike Fantasia, Madeline Bell, Peter Costelli, Linda Emmons-Cunningham, Saisie M. Jang, Dan Kemp, Donny Martino Jr., Lori A. Balton, Kenneth Hunter, Peter Moody, Matthew Riutta

^2006 Motion Picture Sound Editors nominees for "Best Dialogue and ADR in a Feature Film": Wylie Stateman (supervising sound editor); Renée Tondelli (supervising adr/dialogue editor); Linda Folk (adr editor); Laura Harris Atkinson, Julie Feiner, Michael Hertlein, Michelle Pazer (dialogue editors)

^2006 Motion Picture Sound Editors nominees for "Best Sound Effects and Foley in a Feature Film": Harry Cohen, Wylie Stateman (supervising sound editors); Dino Dimuro, Hector C. Gika, Ann Scibelli, Branden Spencer (sound editors); Michael Broomberg, Gary A. Hecker (Foley artists)
