= List of accolades received by Howl's Moving Castle =

Howl's Moving Castle accolades
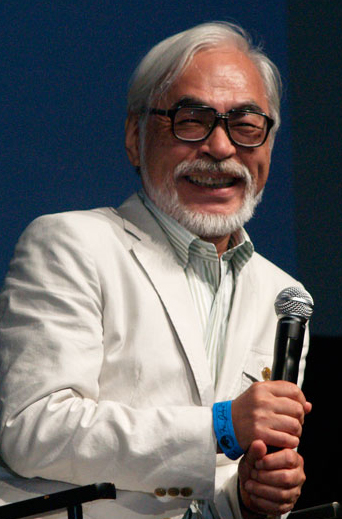
- Hayao Miyazaki received several awards and nominations for his direction and screenplay.
Accolades
Award	Wins	Nominations
Academy Awards	0	1
Anime Grand Prix	3	3
Annie Awards	0	3
Critics' Choice Movie Awards	0	1
Golden Reel Awards	0	1
Hollywood Film Festival	1	1
Hong Kong Film Awards	0	1
Japan Media Arts Festival	1	1
Los Angeles Film Critics Association	1	1
Mainichi Film Awards	1	1
Maui Film Festival	1	1
MTV Russia Movie Awards	0	1
Nastro d'Argento	0	1
Nebula Awards	1	1
New York Film Critics Circle	1	1
Online Film Critics Society	0	1
Reykjavík International Film Festival	1	1
San Diego Film Critics Society	1	1
Satellite Awards	0	1
Saturn Awards	0	1
Seattle International Film Festival	1	1
Sitges Film Festival	1	1
Tokyo Anime Awards	4	4
Venice International Film Festival	1	2
Young Artist Awards	0	1

Totals (Note: Certain award groups do not simply award one winner. They acknowledge several different recipients, have runners-up, and have third place. Since this is a specific recognition and is different from losing an award, runner-up mentions are considered wins in this award tally. For simplification and to avoid errors, each award in this list has been presumed to have had a prior nomination.)
- Wins: 19
- Nominations: 33

This is a list of accolades received by the 2004 film Howl's Moving Castle, directed by Hayao Miyazaki.

== Accolades ==
Accolades received by Howl's Moving Castle
Award	Date of ceremony	Category	Recipient(s)	Result	Ref.
Academy Awards	5 March 2006	Best Animated Feature	Hayao Miyazaki	Nominated	
Anime Grand Prix	No ceremony (Note: Results were released in the June 2005 issue of Animage, published on 10 May 2005.)	Grand Prix	Howl's Moving Castle	9th place (Note: Tied with Inuyasha)	
Anime Grand Prix	No ceremony	Best Male Character	Howl	14th place	
Anime Grand Prix	No ceremony	Best Female Character	Sophie	14th place (Note: Tied with Motoko Kusanagi from Ghost in the Shell: S.A.C. 2nd Gig)	
Annie Awards	4 February 2006	Best Animated Feature	Howl's Moving Castle	Nominated	
Annie Awards	4 February 2006	Best Directing in a Feature Production	Hayao Miyazaki	Nominated	
Annie Awards	4 February 2006	Best Writing in a Feature Production	Hayao Miyazaki, Cindy Davis Hewitt, and Donald H. Hewitt	Nominated	
Critics' Choice Movie Awards	9 January 2006	Best Animated Feature	Howl's Moving Castle	Nominated	
Golden Reel Awards	4 March 2006	Best Sound Editing in a Feature Animation – Sound FX/Foley, Dialogue/ADR & Music	Petra Bach, Toru Noguchi, Yukio Hokari, Mizuki Itou, Masaya Kitada, and Akihiko Okase	Nominated	
Hollywood Film Festival	24 October 2005	Hollywood Animation of the Year Award	Howl's Moving Castle	Won	
Hong Kong Film Awards	8 April 2006	Best Asian Film	Howl's Moving Castle	Nominated	
Japan Media Arts Festival	24 February 2005	Excellence Prize – Animation Division	Howl's Moving Castle	Won	
Los Angeles Film Critics Association	11 December 2005	Best Music	Joe Hisaishi and Youmi Kimura	Won	
Mainichi Film Awards	9 February 2005	Movie Fan Award – Japanese Film	Howl's Moving Castle	Won	
Maui Film Festival	19 June 2005	Starz Audience Award – Best Feature	Howl's Moving Castle	Won	
MTV Russia Movie Awards	21 April 2006	Best Animated Film	Howl's Moving Castle	Nominated	
Nastro d'Argento	7 February 2006	Best Director of a Foreign Film	Hayao Miyazaki	Nominated	
Nebula Awards	12 May 2007	Best Script	Hayao Miyazaki, Cindy Davis Hewitt, and Donald H. Hewitt	Won	
New York Film Critics Circle	8 January 2006	Best Animated Feature	Howl's Moving Castle	Won	
Online Film Critics Society	16 January 2006	Best Animated Feature	Howl's Moving Castle	Nominated	
Reykjavík International Film Festival	9 October 2005	Audience Award	Howl's Moving Castle	Won	
San Diego Film Critics Society	19 December 2005	Best Animated Film	Howl's Moving Castle	Won	
Satellite Awards	17 December 2005	Best Motion Picture, Animated or Mixed Media	Howl's Moving Castle	Nominated	
Saturn Awards	2 May 2006	Best Animated Film	Howl's Moving Castle	Nominated	
Seattle International Film Festival	12 June 2005	Golden Space Needle Award	Howl's Moving Castle	Runner-up	
Sitges Film Festival	11 December 2004	Audience Award	Howl's Moving Castle	Won	
Tokyo Anime Awards	2 April 2005	Animation of the Year	Howl's Moving Castle	Won	
Tokyo Anime Awards	2 April 2005	Best Director	Hayao Miyazaki	Won	
Tokyo Anime Awards	2 April 2005	Best Voice Actor	Chieko Baisho	Won	
Tokyo Anime Awards	2 April 2005	Best Music	Joe Hisaishi	Won	
Venice International Film Festival	11 September 2004	Golden Lion	Howl's Moving Castle	Nominated	
Venice International Film Festival	11 September 2004	Golden Osella	Studio Ghibli	Won	
Young Artist Awards	25 March 2006	Best Family Feature Film – Animation	Howl's Moving Castle	Nominated	
