= Chicago Film Critics Association Awards 2005 =

Annual US film awards ceremony

18th CFCA Awards

January 9, 2005

Best Film:
Crash

The 18th Chicago Film Critics Association Awards, given by the CFCA on January 9, 2006, honored the best in film for 2005.

== Winners and nominees ==
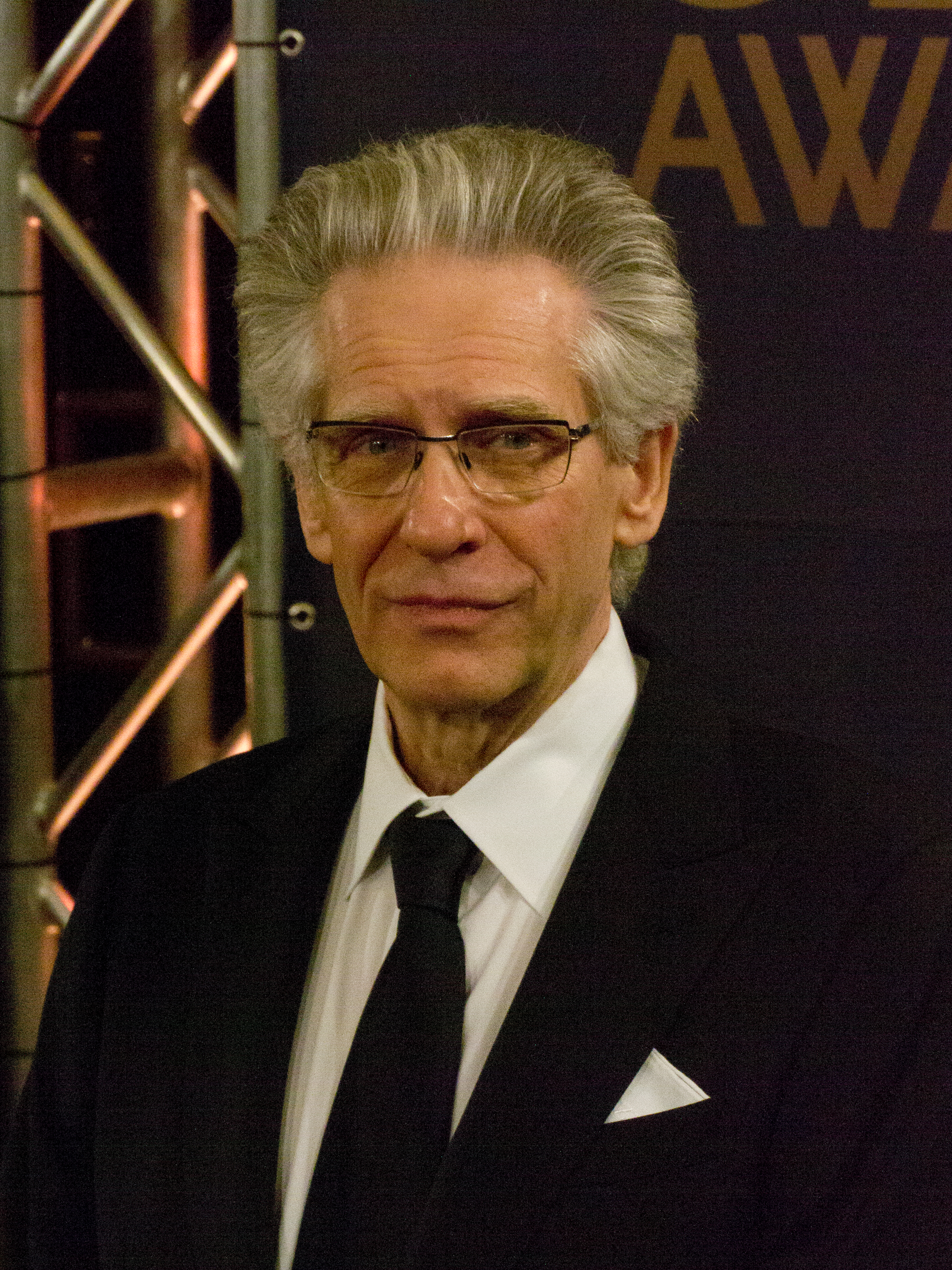
David Cronenberg, Best Director winner

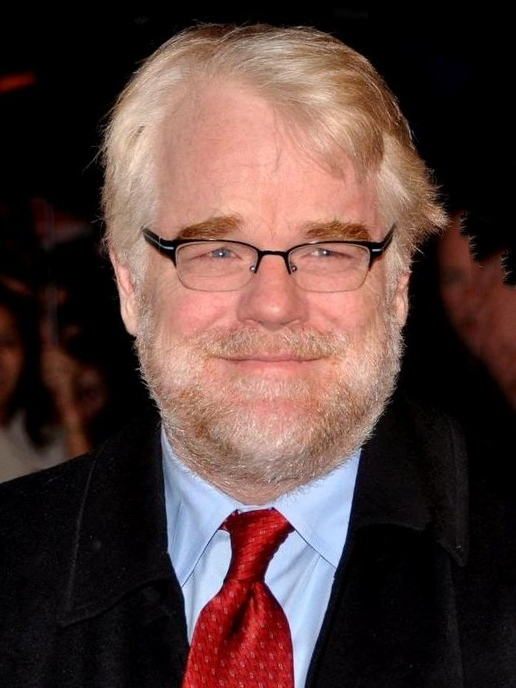
Philip Seymour Hoffman, Best Actor winner

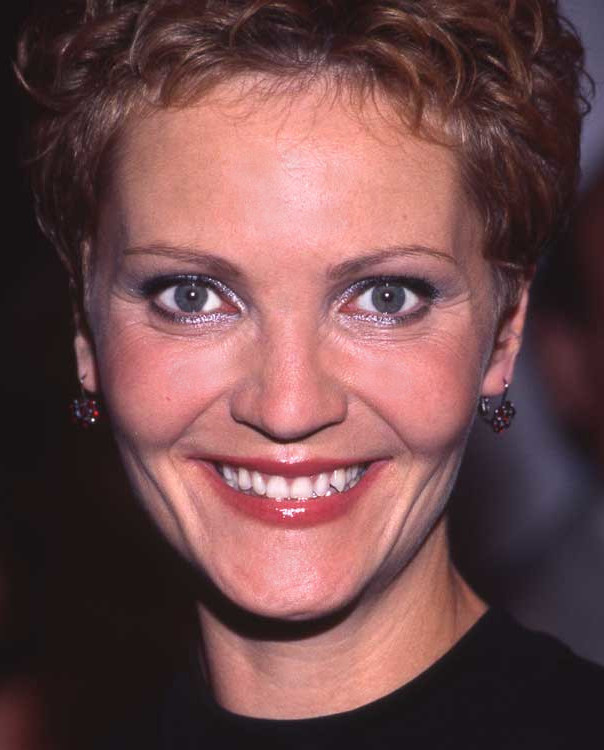
Joan Allen, Best Actress winner

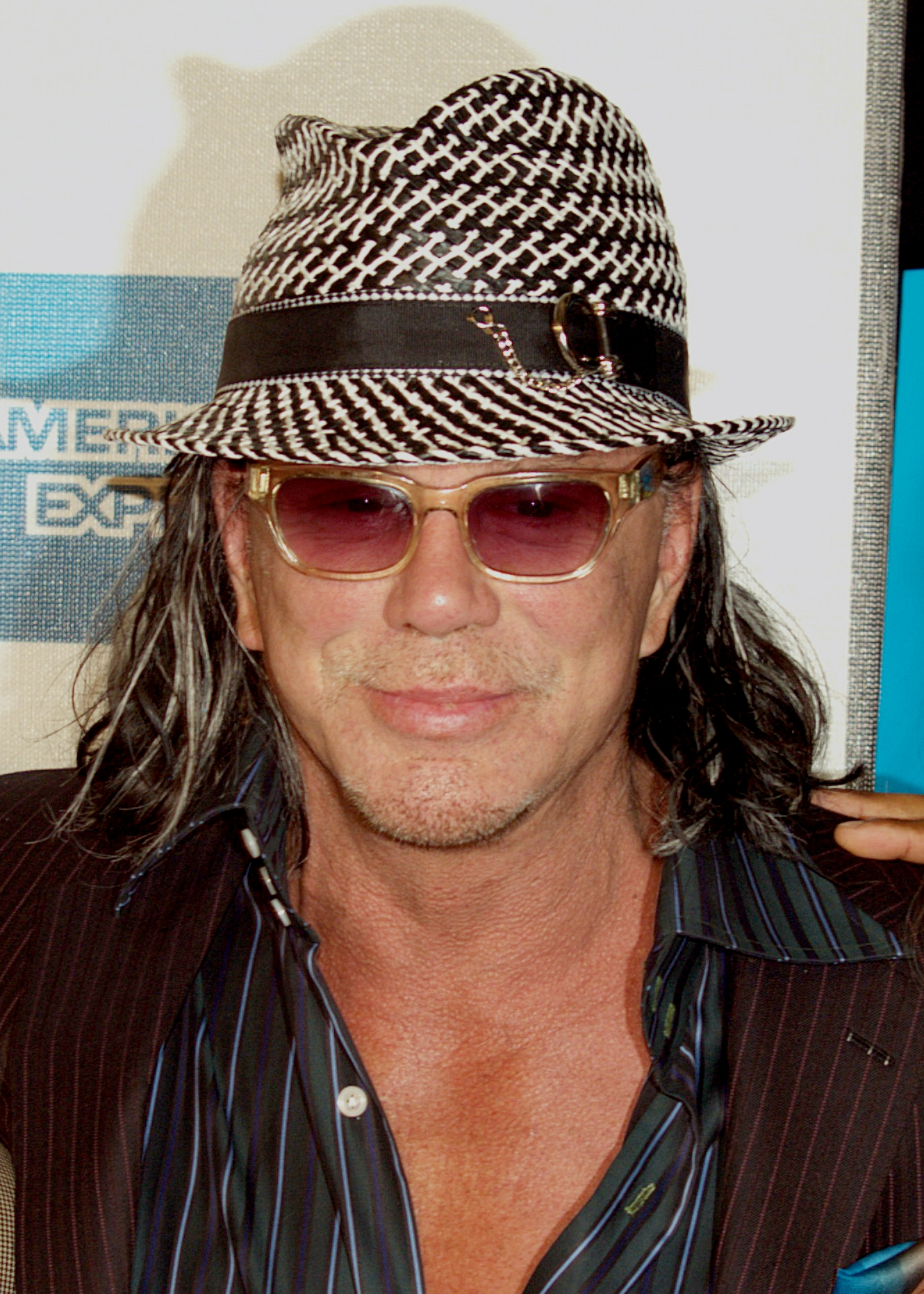
Mickey Rourke, Best Supporting Actor winner

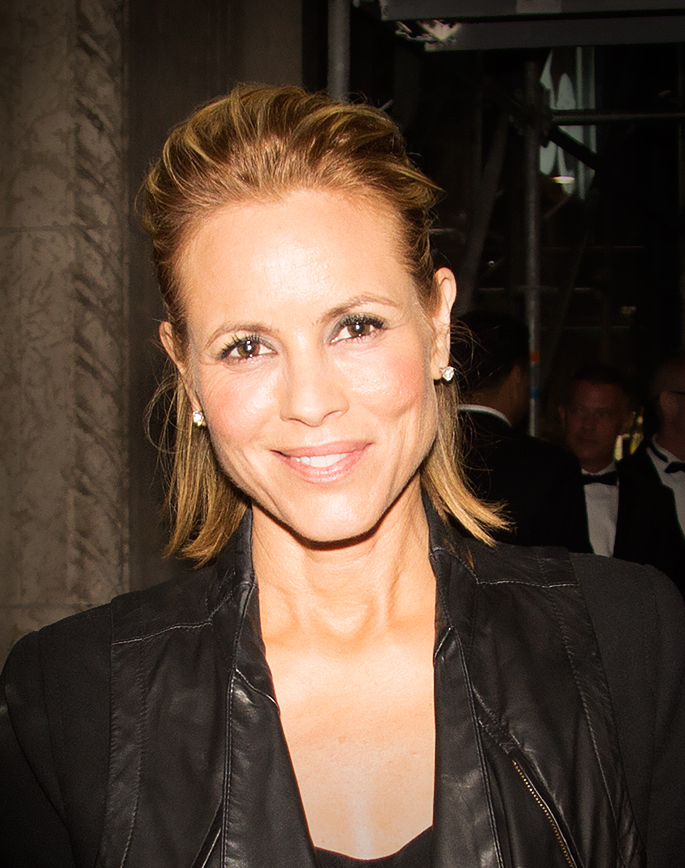
Maria Bello, Best Supporting Actress winner

=== Best Actor ===
Philip Seymour Hoffman – Capote

- Terrence Howard – Hustle & Flow
- Heath Ledger – Brokeback Mountain
- Joaquin Phoenix – Walk the Line
- David Strathairn – Good Night, and Good Luck.

=== Best Actress ===
Joan Allen – The Upside of Anger

- Felicity Huffman – Transamerica
- Keira Knightley – Pride & Prejudice
- Naomi Watts – King Kong
- Reese Witherspoon – Walk the Line

=== Best Cinematography ===
Brokeback Mountain – Rodrigo Prieto

- Good Night, and Good Luck. – Robert Elswit
- King Kong – Andrew Lesnie
- Munich – Janusz Kamiński
- The New World – Emmanuel Lubezki
- Pride & Prejudice – Roman Osin

=== Best Director ===
David Cronenberg – A History of Violence

- George Clooney – Good Night, and Good Luck.
- Peter Jackson – King Kong
- Ang Lee – Brokeback Mountain
- Steven Spielberg – Munich

=== Best Documentary Film ===
Grizzly Man

- Enron: The Smartest Guys in the Room
- Mad Hot Ballroom
- March of the Penguins
- Murderball

=== Best Film ===
Crash

- Brokeback Mountain
- Good Night, and Good Luck.
- A History of Violence
- King Kong

=== Best Foreign Language Film ===
Caché (Hidden), France

- 2046, Hong Kong
- Downfall (Der Untergang), Germany
- Kung Fu Hustle (Kung fu), Hong Kong
- Oldboy, South Korea

=== Best Original Score ===
Brokeback Mountain – Gustavo Santaolalla

- Batman Begins – Hans Zimmer and James Newton Howard
- Charlie and the Chocolate Factory – Danny Elfman
- King Kong – James Newton Howard
- Memoirs of a Geisha – John Williams

=== Best Screenplay ===
Crash – Paul Haggis and Bobby Moresco

- Brokeback Mountain – Larry McMurtry and Diana Ossana
- Capote – Dan Futterman
- Good Night, and Good Luck. – George Clooney and Grant Heslov
- A History of Violence – Josh Olson

=== Best Supporting Actor ===
Mickey Rourke – Sin City

- Matt Dillon – Crash
- Paul Giamatti – Cinderella Man
- Jake Gyllenhaal – Brokeback Mountain
- Terrence Howard – Crash
- Donald Sutherland – Pride & Prejudice

=== Best Supporting Actress ===
Maria Bello – A History of Violence

- Amy Adams – Junebug
- Scarlett Johansson – Match Point
- Catherine Keener – Capote
- Rachel Weisz – The Constant Gardener
- Michelle Williams – Brokeback Mountain

=== Most Promising Filmmaker ===
Bennett Miller – Capote

- Craig Brewer – Hustle & Flow
- Miranda July – Me and You and Everyone We Know
- Phil Morrison – Junebug
- Joe Wright – Pride & Prejudice

=== Most Promising Performer ===
Miranda July – Me and You and Everyone We Know

- Chris "Ludacris" Bridges – Crash and Hustle & Flow
- Georgie Henley – The Chronicles of Narnia: The Lion, the Witch and the Wardrobe
- Q'Orianka Kilcher – The New World
- Owen Kline – The Squid and the Whale
