= Laurent Chalet =

French cinematographer

Laurent Chalet (12 December 1969 in Limoges, Haute-Vienne) is a French cinematographer who has made his career in both the fiction and documentary realms.

Chalet filmed the 2006 Academy Award-winning documentary March of the Penguins, which was also nominated for the BAFTA Best Photography award. In 2006, Chalet initiated legal action against the producers of the film, alleging that his royalty contract had been renegotiated under duress, and that he had not been credited for authorship.
