= A History of Violence =

2005 film directed by David Cronenberg

- Theatrical release poster
- Directed by: David Cronenberg
- Screenplay by: Josh Olson
- Based on: A History of Violence by: John Wagner; Vince Locke
- Produced by: Chris Bender; J. C. Spink
- Starring: Viggo Mortensen; Maria Bello; William Hurt; Ed Harris
- Cinematography: Peter Suschitzky
- Edited by: Ronald Sanders
- Music by: Howard Shore
- Production companies: BenderSpink; Media I! Filmproduktion München & Company
- Distributed by: New Line Cinema (United States); Odeon Films (Canada); Warner Bros. Pictures (Germany)
- Release dates: May 16, 2005 (Cannes); September 30, 2005 (United States)
- Running time: 96 minutes
- Countries: United States; Canada; Germany
- Language: English
- Budget: $32 million
- Box office: $61.4 million

A History of Violence is a 2005 crime thriller film directed by David Cronenberg and written by Josh Olson. It is an adaptation of the 1997 DC graphic novel by John Wagner and Vince Locke. The film stars Viggo Mortensen, Maria Bello, Ed Harris, and William Hurt. In the film, a diner owner becomes a local hero after he foils an attempted robbery but has to face his past enemies to protect his family.

A History of Violence premiered in competition for the Palme d'Or at the 2005 Cannes Film Festival and was put into a limited release in the United States on September 23, 2005, followed by a wide release on September 30, 2005. It has been described as one of the greatest films of the 2000s and has been named on various greatest of all time lists. The film was praised for its performances, screenwriting, and atmosphere. William Hurt was nominated for the Academy Award for Best Supporting Actor, and Olson was nominated for Best Adapted Screenplay. Mortensen himself praised it as "one of the best movies [he's] ever been in, if not the best". It is also notable as being one of the last, if not the last, major Hollywood films to be released on VHS.

== Plot ==
Tom Stall is a diner owner who lives in the rural town of Millbrook, Indiana, with wife Edie, teenage son Jack, and daughter Sarah. One night, two spree killers attempt to rob the restaurant. When a waitress is threatened, Tom deftly kills both robbers with skill and precision. He is hailed as a hero, and the story is picked up by the national news media.

Soon after, Tom is visited by Philadelphia-based mobster Carl Fogarty, who alleges that Tom is actually a former mob hitman named Joey Cusack. He vehemently denies this, but Carl remains persistent and begins to stalk the Stall family. Under pressure from Carl and his newfound fame, Tom's relationship with his family becomes strained. Following an argument with Tom over the use of violence on a bully at his school, Jack runs away. He is caught by Carl, who, with Jack as his hostage, goes with his henchmen to the Stall house and demands that "Joey" return to Philadelphia with them. After the gangsters release Jack, Tom efficiently kills both of Carl's henchmen, but Carl shoots and incapacitates him. Lying injured, Tom admits that he "should have killed you (Fogarty) back in Philly", confirming his true identity. Carl is flattered by the proclamation, but before he can shoot him dead, Jack kills him.

At the hospital, Edie confronts Tom, who admits to being Joey Cusack. He tells her that he ran from Philadelphia to escape his criminal past. This admission deepens the tensions in their marriage. After Tom gets out of the hospital, the local sheriff, Sam, expresses his concern and suspicions. Just as he is about to confess, Edie lies to Sam and convinces him to leave. The couple then gets into a domestic dispute, culminating in violent sex. Afterward, Edie and Jack continue to further distance themselves from Tom, leaving him isolated.

Tom's brother, crime boss Richie Cusack, calls him and demands his return to Philadelphia, threatening to come to Indiana if he does not. In Philadelphia, Tom learns that the mobsters he offended took out their frustrations on Richie, penalizing him financially and delaying his advancement in the organization. Tom offers to make peace, but Richie orders his men to kill his brother. Tom manages to kill most of the gangsters and escapes. As Richie and his last henchman are hunting for him, Tom kills the henchman, takes his gun, and kills Richie when he tricks him into exiting the house.

Tom returns home, where the atmosphere is tense and silent as the family sits around the dinner table. Sarah eventually hands him a dinner plate. Some moments later, Jack offers him a communal plate of food, and Edie looks at Tom with tears in her eyes.

== Cast ==
- Viggo Mortensen as Joey Cusack / Tom Stall
- Maria Bello as Edie Stall
- Ed Harris as Carl Fogarty
- William Hurt as Richie Cusack
- Ashton Holmes as Jack Stall
- Peter MacNeill as Sheriff Sam Carney
- Stephen McHattie as Leland Jones
- Greg Bryk as Billy Orser
- R. D. Reid as Pat
- Sumela Kay as Judy
- Gerry Quigley as Mick
- Deborah Drakeford as Charlotte
- Heidi Hayes as Sarah Stall
- Aidan Devine as Charlie Roarke
- Bill McDonald as Frank Mulligan
- Michelle McCree as Jenny Wyeth
- Ian Matthews as Ruben
- Morgan Kelly as Buddy
- Kyle Schmid as Bobby

== Production ==
The film is based on the original graphic novel.

Mortensen read Olson's original version of the script and "was quite disappointed. It was 120-odd pages of just mayhem; kind of senseless, really." He only agreed to do the movie after meeting with Cronenberg, who (according to Mortensen) reworked the script.

Most of the film was shot in Millbrook, Ontario. The shopping centre scene was shot in Tottenham, Ontario, and the climactic scene was shot at the historic Eaton Hall Mansion, located in King City, Ontario. Harrison Ford turned down the role of Tom Stall. Cronenberg stated that "I think it took three weeks to edit".

=== Alternate versions ===
The U.S. and European versions differ on only two fight scenes - one where Tom breaks the nose of one of Fogarty's thugs and one where he stomps on the throat of one of Richie Cusack's thugs. Both scenes display more blood flowing or gushing out of the victims in the European version. In addition, a more pronounced bone-crushing sound effect is used when Tom stomps on the thug's throat.

A deleted scene, known as "Scene 44", features a dream sequence in the diner, where Fogarty tells Tom he will kill his family and him, to which Tom responds by shooting him with his shotgun at close range. He then approaches Fogarty's mangled body, who raises a gun and shoots him. In behind-the-scenes footage, Cronenberg expressed apprehension about the scene's similarity to his previous work. He even suggested a desire to have Fogarty retrieve the gun from his chest cavity had the action not been too similar to a scene from Videodrome.

=== Interpretation ===
The film's title plays on multiple levels of meaning. Film critic Roger Ebert stated that Cronenberg refers to three possibilities:

... (1) a suspect with a long history of violence; (2) the historical use of violence as a means of settling disputes, and (3) the innate violence of Darwinian evolution, in which better-adapted organisms replace those less able to cope. "I am a complete Darwinian", says Cronenberg, whose new film is in many ways about the survival of the fittest—at all costs.

Cronenberg himself described the film as a meditation on the human body and its relationship to violence:

For me, the first fact of human existence is the human body. I'm not an atheist, but for me to turn away from any aspect of the human body to me is a philosophical betrayal. And there's a lot of art and religion whose whole purpose is to turn away from the human body. I feel in my art that my mandate is not do that. So whether it's beautiful things—the sexuality part, or the violent part, or the gooey part—it's just body fluids. It's when Elliott in Dead Ringer (sic) says, "Why are there no beauty contests for the insides of bodies?" It's a thought that disturbs me. How can we be disgusted by our own bodies? That really doesn't make any human sense. It makes some animal sense, but it doesn't make human sense, so I'm always discussing that in my movies and in this movie in particular. I don't ever feel that I've been exploitive in a crude, vulgar way, or just doing it to get attention. It's always got a purpose, which I can be very articulate about. In this movie, we've got an audience that's definitely going to applaud these acts of violence, and they do because it's set up that these acts are justifiable and almost heroic at times. But I'm saying, "Okay, if you can applaud that, can you applaud this?" because this is the result of that gunshot in the head. It's not nice. And even if the violence is justifiable, the consequences of the violence are the same. The body does not know what the morality of that act was. So I'm asking the audience to see if they can contain the whole experience of this violent act instead of just the heroic/dramatic one. I'm saying, "Here's the really nasty effects on these nasty guys, but still, the effects are very nasty." And that's the paradox and conundrum."

== Music ==
The soundtrack to A History of Violence was released on October 11, 2005. The score was composed by Howard Shore.

== Release ==
=== Theatrical ===
A History of Violence premiered at the Cannes Film Festival on May 16, 2005, and was released in the United States on September 30, following a limited release on September 23, 2005.

=== Home media ===
The film was released on DVD and VHS formats on March 14, 2006, and was reported by the Los Angeles Times as being the last major Hollywood film to be released on VHS, excluding limited promotional releases. It was released on Blu-ray by Warner Bros. in 2009.

The film was released on Ultra HD Blu-ray (alongside a remastered Blu-ray) on October 21, 2025, by The Criterion Collection.

== Reception ==
=== Box office ===
The film started with a limited release in 14 theaters and grossed $515,992 at the box office, averaging $36,856 per theater. A week later, it went on a wide release in 1,340 theaters and grossed $8.1 million over the weekend. During its entire theatrical run, the film grossed $31.5 million in the United States and a total of $61.4 million worldwide.

=== Critical response ===
On the review aggregator website Rotten Tomatoes, 88% of 216 critics' reviews are positive, with an average rating of 7.90/10. The website's consensus reads: "A History of Violence raises compelling and thoughtful questions about the nature of violence, while representing a return to form for director David Cronenberg in one of his more uncharacteristic pieces." Metacritic, which uses a weighted average, assigned the film a score of 82 out of 100, based on 37 critics, indicating "universal acclaim". Audiences polled by CinemaScore gave the film an average grade of "C+" on an A+ to F scale.

Rolling Stone critic Peter Travers gave the film four stars, highlighting its "explosive power and subversive wit", and lauded David Cronenberg as a "world-class director, at the top of his startlingly creative form". Entertainment Weekly reviewer Lisa Schwarzbaum gave the film an A, concluding that "David Cronenberg's brilliant movie" was "without a doubt one of the very best of the year".

Manohla Dargis of The New York Times called the film a "mindblower", and noted Cronenberg's "refusal to let us indulge in movie violence without paying a price". Roger Ebert also gave the film a positive review, observing, "A History of Violence seems deceptively straightforward, coming from a director with Cronenberg's quirky complexity, but think again. This is not a movie about plot, but about character." He gave it three and a half out of four stars.

It was ranked the best film of 2005 in the Village Voice Film Poll.

In December 2005, it was named to the Toronto International Film Festival's annual Canada's top-ten list of the year's best Canadian films.

BBC film critic Mark Kermode named the film the best of 2005.

=== Retrospective lists ===
In 2010, Empire named the film the 448th-greatest film of all time.

The French film magazine Cahiers du Cinéma ranked the film as fifth place in its list of best films of the decade, 2000–2009.

In his list of best films of the decade, Peter Travers named this number four, praising director David Cronenberg:

Is Canadian director David Cronenberg the most unsung maverick artist in movies? Bet on it ... Cronenberg knows violence is wired into our DNA. His film showed how we secretly crave what we publicly condemn. This is potent poison for a thriller, and unadulterated, unforgettable Cronenberg.

In 2016, the film was ranked among the 100 greatest films since 2000 in an international critics' poll by 177 critics around the world.

In 2025, it ranked number 33 on Rolling Stone's list of "The 100 Best Movies of the 21st Century."

=== Accolades ===
Accolades for A History of Violence
Award	Category	Nominee(s)	Result
Academy Awards	Best Supporting Actor	William Hurt	Nominated
Academy Awards	Best Adapted Screenplay	Josh Olson	Nominated
American Film Institute Awards	Top 10 Movie of the Year		Won
Austin Film Critics Association Awards	Best Supporting Actor	William Hurt	Won
Awards Circuit Community Awards	Best Director	David Cronenberg	Nominated
Awards Circuit Community Awards	Best Actress in a Supporting Role	Maria Bello	Nominated
Awards Circuit Community Awards	Best Adapted Screenplay	Josh Olson	Runner-up
Awards Circuit Community Awards	Best Cinematography	Peter Suschitzky	Nominated
Awards Circuit Community Awards	Best Original Score	Howard Shore	Nominated
Belgian Film Critics Association Awards	Grand Prix	David Cronenberg	Nominated
Bodil Awards	Best American Film	David Cronenberg	Won
British Academy Film Awards	Best Adapted Screenplay	Josh Olson	Nominated
Cahiers du Cinéma (2005)	Top 10 Film	David Cronenberg	2nd Place
Cahiers du Cinéma (2010)	Best Film of the 2000s	David Cronenberg	5th Place
Cannes Film Festival	Palme d'Or	David Cronenberg	Nominated
Central Ohio Film Critics Association Awards	Best Film		2nd Place
Central Ohio Film Critics Association Awards	Best Director	David Cronenberg	Won
Central Ohio Film Critics Association Awards	Best Supporting Actress	Maria Bello	Won
César Awards	Best Foreign Film	David Cronenberg	Nominated
Chicago Film Critics Association Awards	Best Film		Nominated
Chicago Film Critics Association Awards	Best Director	David Cronenberg	Won
Chicago Film Critics Association Awards	Best Supporting Actress	Maria Bello	Won
Chicago Film Critics Association Awards	Best Screenplay	Josh Olson	Nominated
Critics' Choice Awards	Best Supporting Actress	Maria Bello	Nominated
Dallas–Fort Worth Film Critics Association Awards	Best Picture		8th Place
David di Donatello Awards	Best Foreign Film	David Cronenberg	Nominated
Directors Guild of Canada Awards	Outstanding Feature Film		Won
Directors Guild of Canada Awards	Outstanding Direction – Feature Film	David Cronenberg	Won
Directors Guild of Canada Awards	Outstanding Picture Editing – Feature Film	Ronald Sanders	Won
Directors Guild of Canada Awards	Outstanding Production Design – Feature Film	Carol Spier	Nominated
Directors Guild of Canada Awards	Outstanding Sound Editing – Feature Film	Alastair Gray and Michael O'Farrell	Won
Edgar Allan Poe Awards	Best Motion Picture Screenplay	Josh Olson (screenplay); John Wagner and Vince Locke (graphic novel)	Nominated
Empire Awards	Best Thriller		Nominated
Empire Awards	Best Actor	Viggo Mortensen	Nominated
French Syndicate of Cinema Critics Awards	Best Foreign Film	David Cronenberg	Won
Gold Derby Film Awards	Best Motion Picture	Chris Bender, David Cronenberg and J.C. Spink	Nominated
Gold Derby Film Awards	Best Director	David Cronenberg	Nominated
Gold Derby Film Awards	Best Supporting Actress	Maria Bello	Nominated
Gold Derby Film Awards	Best Adapted Screenplay	Josh Olson	Nominated
Golden Globe Awards	Best Motion Picture – Drama		Nominated
Golden Globe Awards	Best Actress in a Motion Picture – Drama	Maria Bello	Nominated
Golden Schmoes Awards	Best Supporting Actress of the Year	Maria Bello	Won
Gotham Independent Film Awards	Best Feature	David Cronenberg, Chris Bender, and J.C. Spink	Nominated
Hollywood Legacy Awards	Writer of the Year	Josh Olson	Won
International Cinephile Society Awards	Top 10 Films of the Year		3rd Place
International Cinephile Society Awards	Best Director	David Cronenberg	Won
International Cinephile Society Awards	Best Supporting Actor	William Hurt	Runner-up
International Cinephile Society Awards	Best Adapted Screenplay	Josh Olson	Runner-up
International Film Music Critics Association Awards	Best Original Score for a Horror/Thriller Film	Howard Shore	Won
International Online Cinema Awards	Best Picture		Nominated
International Online Cinema Awards	Best Director	David Cronenberg	Nominated
International Online Cinema Awards	Best Actor	Viggo Mortensen	Nominated
International Online Cinema Awards	Best Supporting Actor	William Hurt	Nominated
International Online Cinema Awards	Best Supporting Actress	Maria Bello	Nominated
International Online Cinema Awards	Best Adapted Screenplay	Josh Olson	Nominated
Italian Online Movie Awards	Best Director	David Cronenberg	Nominated
Italian Online Movie Awards	Best Supporting Actress	Maria Bello	Nominated
Kansas City Film Critics Circle Awards	Best Supporting Actress	Maria Bello	Won
Las Vegas Film Critics Society Awards	Best Picture		5th Place
London Film Critics Circle Awards	Film of the Year		Nominated
London Film Critics Circle Awards	Director of the Year	David Cronenberg	Nominated
London Film Critics Circle Awards	Actor of the Year	Viggo Mortensen	Nominated
London Film Critics Circle Awards	Actress of the Year	Maria Bello	Nominated
Los Angeles Film Critics Association Awards	Best Film		Runner-up
Los Angeles Film Critics Association Awards	Best Director	David Cronenberg	Runner-up
Los Angeles Film Critics Association Awards	Best Supporting Actor	William Hurt	Won
National Board of Review Awards	Top Ten Films		5th Place
National Society of Film Critics Awards	Best Film		2nd Place
National Society of Film Critics Awards	Best Director	David Cronenberg	Won
National Society of Film Critics Awards	Best Supporting Actor	Ed Harris	Won
New York Film Critics Circle Awards	Best Film		Runner-up
New York Film Critics Circle Awards	Best Director	David Cronenberg	Runner-up
New York Film Critics Circle Awards	Best Actor	Viggo Mortensen	Runner-up
New York Film Critics Circle Awards	Best Supporting Actor	William Hurt	Won
New York Film Critics Circle Awards	Best Supporting Actress	Maria Bello	Won
North Texas Film Critics Association Awards	Best Supporting Actor	William Hurt	Won
Online Film & Television Association Awards	Best Picture	Chris Bender, David Cronenberg, and J.C. Spink	Nominated
Online Film & Television Association Awards	Best Director	David Cronenberg	Nominated
Online Film & Television Association Awards	Best Supporting Actor	William Hurt	Nominated
Online Film & Television Association Awards	Best Supporting Actress	Maria Bello	Won
Online Film & Television Association Awards	Best Adapted Screenplay	Josh Olson	Nominated
Online Film & Television Association Awards	Best Film Editing	Ronald Sanders	Nominated
Online Film & Television Association Awards	Best Casting	Mark Bennett and Deirdre Brown	Nominated
Online Film & Television Association Awards	Best Cinematic Moment	Stair Scene	Nominated
Online Film & Television Association Awards	Best Official Film Website		Nominated
Online Film Critics Society Awards	Best Picture		Won
Online Film Critics Society Awards	Best Director	David Cronenberg	Won
Online Film Critics Society Awards	Best Supporting Actor	William Hurt	Nominated
Online Film Critics Society Awards	Best Supporting Actress	Maria Bello	Won
Online Film Critics Society Awards	Best Adapted Screenplay	Josh Olson	Nominated
Online Film Critics Society Awards	Best Editing	Ronald Sanders	Nominated
San Diego Film Critics Society Awards	Best Editing	Ronald Sanders	Won
Sant Jordi Awards	Best Foreign Film	David Cronenberg	Won
Satellite Awards (2005)	Best Motion Picture – Drama		Nominated
Satellite Awards (2005)	Best Actor in a Motion Picture – Drama	Viggo Mortensen	Nominated
Satellite Awards (2005)	Best Supporting Actress in a Motion Picture – Drama	Maria Bello	Nominated
Satellite Awards (2006)	Outstanding Overall DVD		Nominated
Saturn Awards	Best Action/Adventure/Thriller Film		Nominated
Saturn Awards	Best Actor	Viggo Mortensen	Nominated
Saturn Awards	Best Supporting Actor	William Hurt	Nominated
Scream Awards	Best Director	David Cronenberg	Nominated
Scream Awards	Most Heroic Performance	Viggo Mortensen	Nominated
Scream Awards	The "Holy Sh!t"/"Jump-From-Your-Seat" Award	The diner shootout	Nominated
SESC Film Festival	Best Foreign Film (Audience Award)	David Cronenberg	Won
Southeastern Film Critics Association Awards	Best Picture		5th Place
St. Louis Film Critics Association Awards	Best Director	David Cronenberg	Nominated
Toronto Film Critics Association Awards	Best Film		Won
Toronto Film Critics Association Awards	Best Canadian Film		Won
Toronto Film Critics Association Awards	Best Director	David Cronenberg	Won
Turkish Film Critics Association Awards	Best Foreign Film		3rd Place
USC Scripter Awards		Josh Olson (screenwriter); John Wagner and Vince Locke (authors)	Nominated
Utah Film Critics Association Awards	Best Actress	Maria Bello	Runner-up
Utah Film Critics Association Awards	Best Supporting Actor	William Hurt	Nominated
Vancouver Film Critics Circle Awards	Best Director	David Cronenberg	Nominated
Village Voice Film Poll	Best Film		Won
Village Voice Film Poll	Best Director	David Cronenberg	Won
Village Voice Film Poll	Best Lead Performance	Viggo Mortensen	7th Place
Village Voice Film Poll	Best Supporting Performance	Maria Bello	Won
Village Voice Film Poll	Best Supporting Performance	Ed Harris	8th Place
Village Voice Film Poll	Best Supporting Performance	William Hurt	5th Place
Village Voice Film Poll	Best Screenplay	Josh Olson	3rd Place
Writers Guild of America Awards	Best Adapted Screenplay	Josh Olson	Nominated
Young Artist Awards	Best Performance in a Feature Film – Young Actress Age Ten or Younger	Heidi Hayes	Nominated

== Indian adaptation ==
Leo, a 2023 Indian Tamil language film co-written and directed by Lokesh Kanagaraj, is an adaptation of A History of Violence. Lokesh said that Leo is his tribute to David Cronenberg's A History of Violence. According to Lokesh, "it inspired me to write Leo. A History of Violence left its mark on me and from that this movie was born. Leo is my tribute".

== Works cited ==
- Cronenberg, David (2006). David Cronenberg: Interviews with Serge Grünberg. Plexus Publishing. ISBN 0859653765.
- Mathijs, Ernest (2008). The Cinema of David Cronenberg: From Baron of Blood to Cultural Hero. Wallflower Press. ISBN 9781905674657.
