= Peter Travers =

American film critic (born 1943 or 1944)

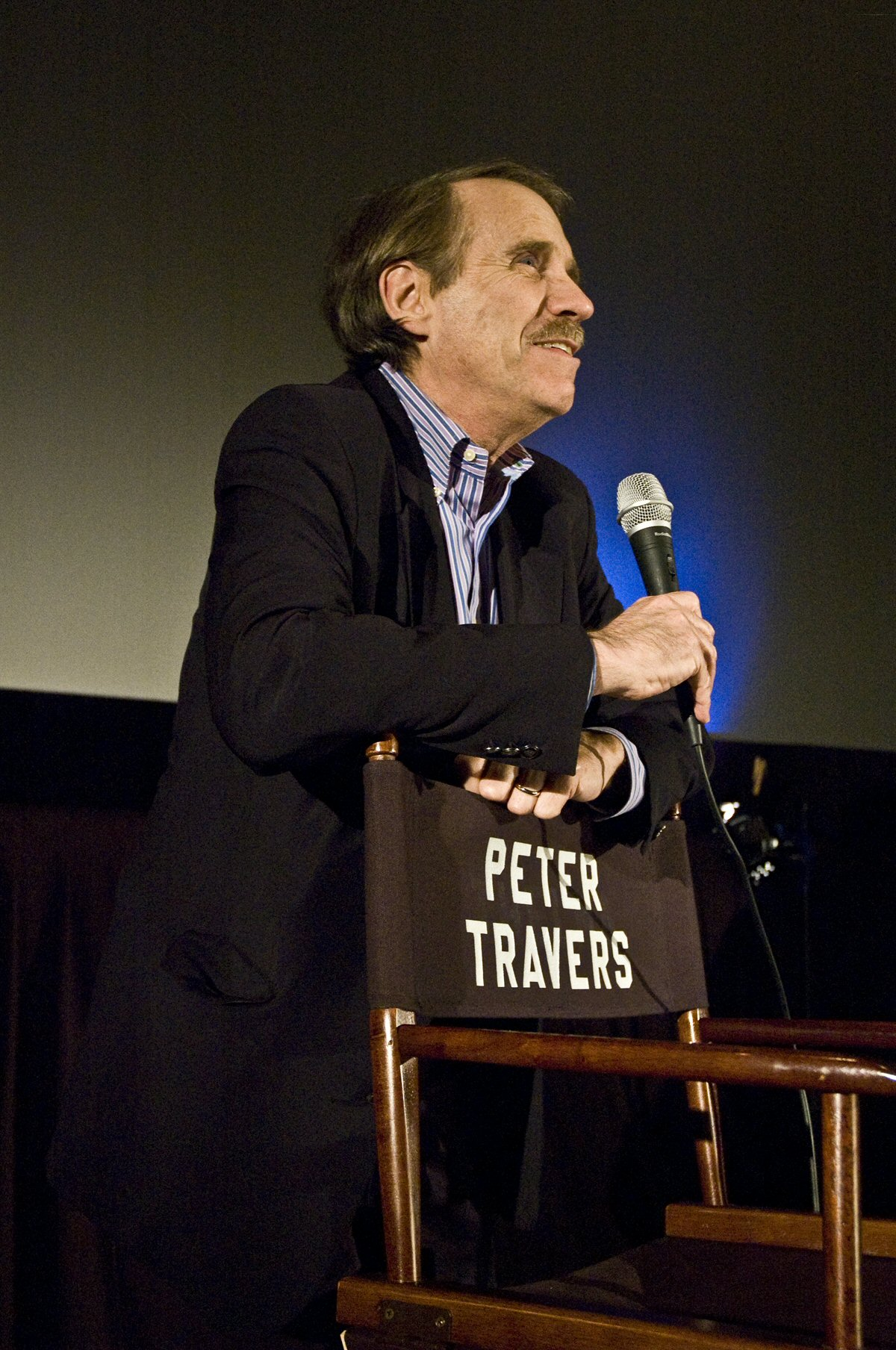
- Travers in 2008
- Born: Peter Joseph Travers; June 27, 1943 (age 83)
- Education: Manhattan College (BA); New York University (MA)
- Occupations: Journalist; film critic
- Years active: 1970–present
- Spouses: Diane Harris (m. 1967, divorced); Robyn Lee Reeves (m. 1980)
- Children: 3

Peter Joseph Travers (born June 27, 1943) is an American film critic, journalist, and television presenter. He reviews films for ABC News and previously served as a movie critic for People and Rolling Stone. Travers also hosts the film interview program Popcorn with Peter Travers for ABC News.

== Early life ==
Travers grew up in Yonkers, New York. He received a Bachelor of Arts degree from Manhattan College in 1965, followed by a Master of Arts degree in English from New York University.

== Career ==
Travers has been called the nation's most "blurbed" film critic. His blurbs appeared in newspapers as early as 1970, when he was a writer for Reader's Digest. By the mid-1970s, he was a film critic for The Herald Statesman, a Yonkers newspaper. In the 1980s, he wrote for People for four years before joining Rolling Stone in 1989. In 2020, he departed Rolling Stone and became the film critic for ABC News.

Travers hosts the New York Film Critics Series, a company that hosts live-streamed screening events and discussions, as well as the ABC News show Popcorn with Peter Travers, where he interviews actors and directors about the latest projects and their lives.

In 2025, he launched a blog entitled The Travers Take which offers his personal opinions on films, television, award season, and trends in the film industry.

== Personal life ==
Travers married Diane Harris of White Plains, New York, in 1967; the marriage ended in divorce. In 1980, Travers married Robyn Lee Reeves, an actress and graduate of Vassar College, in an Episcopalian ceremony. He has three children.

== Preferences ==
=== Favorites ===
In 1999, Travers named The Godfather trilogy (1972–1990) as the best film of the 20th century.

In 2010, when asked to rank the best films of the 2000s decade, Travers named:

1. There Will Be Blood (2007)
2. Children of Men (2006)
3. Mulholland Drive (2001)
4. A History of Violence (2005)
5. No Country for Old Men (2007)
6. The Incredibles (2004)
7. Brokeback Mountain (2005)
8. The Departed (2006)
9. Mystic River (2003)
10. The Lord of the Rings (2001–2003)

=== Best of the year ===
As a film critic for People, Rolling Stone, and ABC, Travers has named these films the best of the year:

- 1989 - Do the Right Thing
- 1990 - Goodfellas
- 1991 - The Silence of the Lambs
- 1992 - The Player
- 1993 - Short Cuts
- 1994 - Pulp Fiction
- 1995 - Get Shorty
- 1996 - The People vs. Larry Flynt
- 1997 - Titanic
- 1998 - The Truman Show
- 1999 - American Beauty
- 2000 - Crouching Tiger, Hidden Dragon
- 2001 - Memento (Indie list) and The Lord of the Rings: The Fellowship of the Ring (Hollywood list)
- 2002 - Gangs of New York
- 2003 - Mystic River
- 2004 - Sideways
- 2005 - A History of Violence
- 2006 - The Departed
- 2007 - No Country for Old Men
- 2008 - Milk
- 2009 - Precious
- 2010 - The Social Network
- 2011 - Drive
- 2012 - The Master
- 2013 - 12 Years a Slave
- 2014 - Boyhood
- 2015 - Spotlight
- 2016 - La La Land
- 2017 - Dunkirk
- 2018 - Roma
- 2019 - The Irishman
- 2020 - Da 5 Bloods
- 2021 - The Power of the Dog
- 2022 - Everything Everywhere All at Once
- 2023 - Killers of the Flower Moon and Oppenheimer
- 2024 - The Brutalist
- 2025 - One Battle After Another
