= March of the Penguins =

2005 documentary film by Luc Jacquet

- Theatrical release poster
- French: La Marche de l'empereur
- Directed by: Luc Jacquet
- Written by: Luc Jacquet; Jordan Roberts (United States)
- Produced by: Yves Darondeau; Christophe Lioud; Emmanuel Priou
- Narrated by: Romane Bohringer; Charles Berling; Jules Sitruk; Morgan Freeman (United States)
- Cinematography: Laurent Chalet; Jérôme Maison
- Edited by: Sabine Emiliani
- Music by: Émilie Simon; Alex Wurman (United States)
- Production companies: Bonne Pioche; National Geographic Films; Wild Bunch
- Distributed by: Buena Vista International France
- Release dates: 21 January 2005 (Sundance); 26 January 2005 (France)
- Running time: 86 minutes
- Country: France
- Language: French
- Budget: $8 million
- Box office: $127.4 million

March of the Penguins (French: La Marche de l'empereur; French pronunciation: [la maʁʃ də lɑ̃ˈpʁœʁ]) is a 2005 French nature documentary film directed and written by Luc Jacquet. The documentary depicts the yearly journey of the emperor penguins of Antarctica. In autumn, all the penguins of breeding age (five years old and over) leave the ocean, which is their normal habitat, to walk inland to their ancestral breeding grounds. There, the penguins participate in a courtship that, if successful, results in the hatching of a chick. For the chick to survive, both parents must make multiple arduous journeys between the ocean and the breeding grounds over the ensuing months.

It took one year for the two isolated cinematographers Laurent Chalet and Jérôme Maison to shoot the documentary, which was shot around French scientific base Dumont d'Urville in Adélie Land.

March of the Penguins was released in France on 26 January 2005 by Buena Vista International France. The documentary won the 2006 Academy Award for Best Documentary Feature. On 1 June 2010, a home video release in France included the film in the Disneynature collection. It is one of the most successful documentaries in North America and France.

A direct sequel titled March of the Penguins 2: The Next Step was released in France in 2017 by Disneynature.

== Subject matter ==
The emperor penguins use a particular spot as their breeding ground because it is on ice that is solid year round with no danger of the ice becoming too soft to support the colony that exists. At the end of Antarctic summer, the breeding ground is only a few hundred meters away from the open water where the penguins can feed. However, by the end of winter, the breeding ground is over 100 kilometres (62 mi) away from the nearest open water. To reach it, all the penguins of breeding age must traverse this great distance.

The penguins practice serial monogamy within each breeding season. The female lays a single egg, and the co-operation of the parents is needed if the chick is to survive. After the female lays the egg, she transfers it to the feet of the waiting male with minimal exposure to the elements, as the intense cold could kill the developing embryo. The male tends to the egg when the female returns to the sea, now even farther away, both to feed herself and to obtain extra food for feeding her chick when she returns. The male has not eaten in two months and by the time the female leaves the hatching area, she will have lost a third of her body weight producing the egg.

For an additional two months, the males huddle together for warmth, and incubate their eggs. They endure temperatures approaching −62 °C (−80 °F), and their only source of water is snow that falls on the breeding ground. When the chicks hatch, the males have only a small meal to feed them, and if the female does not return, they must abandon their chick and return to the sea to feed themselves. By the time they return, the males have lost half their weight and have not eaten for four months. The chicks are also at risk from predatory birds such as northern giant petrels.

The mother penguins come back and feed their young, while the male penguins go all the way back to sea (70 miles) to feed themselves. This gives the mothers time to feed their young ones and bond with them. Unfortunately, a fierce storm arrives and some of the chicks perish.

The death of a chick is tragic, but it does allow the parents to return to the sea to feed for the rest of the breeding season. When a mother penguin loses its young in a fierce storm, it sometimes attempts to steal another mother's chick. When the other parent returns, it can recognize the chick only from its unique call. Many parents die on the trip, killed by exhaustion or by predators (such as the leopard seal), dooming their chicks back at the breeding ground.

The ingenious fight against starvation is a recurring theme throughout the documentary. In one scene, near-starving chicks are shown taking sustenance out of their father's throat sacs, 11th-hour nourishment in the form of a milky, protein-rich substance secreted from a sac in the father's throat to feed their chicks in the event that circumstances require.

The parents must then tend to the chick for an additional four months, shuttling back and forth to the sea to provide food for their young. As spring progresses, the trip gets progressively easier as the ice melts and the distance to the sea decreases, until finally the parents can leave the chicks to fend for themselves.

== Production ==
The DVD version includes a 54-minute film entitled Of Penguins and Men made by the film crew Laurent Chalet and Jérôme Mason about the filming of March of the Penguins.

Director and film crew spent more than 13 months at the Dumont d'Urville Station, where the Institut polaire français Paul-Émile Victor is based. Although the penguins' meeting place, one of four in Antarctica, was known to be near, the day on which it occurs is not known, so they had to be ready every day. Fortunately, the gathering that year was huge – more than 1,200 penguins, compared with the norm of a few hundred.

For cameras to operate at −40°, they had to use film and to load all the film for the day, as it was impossible to reload outside. Because of the isolation from any film studios, remembering each shot was necessary to ensure continuity and to make sure that all the necessary sequences were finished.

The main challenge of making the documentary was the weather with temperatures between −50 and −60 °C (−58 and −76 °F). At dawn, the film crew would spend half an hour putting on six layers of clothes, and on some days they could not spend more than three hours outside. They worked in winds with gusts up to 125 miles per hour, "which in some ways is worse than the cold temperatures" according to director Jacquet.

== Release ==
=== International versions ===
The style of the documentary differs considerably between the original French version and some of the international versions.

The original French-language release features a romanticized first-person narrative as if the story is being told by the penguins themselves. The narration alternates between a female (Romane Bohringer) and a male (Charles Berling) narrator speaking the alternate roles of the female and male penguin, and as the chicks are born, their narration is handled by child actor Jules Sitruk. This style is mimicked in some of the international versions. For example, in the Hungarian version, actors Ákos Kőszegi, Anna Kubik, and Gábor Morvai provide the voices of the penguins, and the German version as seen in German theaters (and in the televised broadcast in April 2007 on channel ProSieben) uses the voices of Andrea Loewig, Thorsten Michaelis, and Adrian Kilian for the "dubbed dialog" of the penguins. This style of narration is also used in the Danish and Cantonese DVD versions.

The French release was handled by Buena Vista International France, a division of Walt Disney Studios. Disney also attempted to get American distribution rights to the film, but their bid ultimately failed; the English-language distribution rights were later acquired at the Sundance documentary festival in January 2005 by Adam Leipzig of National Geographic Films, who had forged a distribution partnership with Warner Bros. Pictures (in which its parent company would later merge with National Geographic's rival Discovery giving Discovery a part of the film's rights) via their Warner Independent Pictures label. In contrast to the French version, their English release uses a more traditional third-person narrative by a single voice, actor Morgan Freeman. Similarly, the Austrian channel ORF 1 used for their broadcast in April 2007, the alternate version available on the German "Special Edition" DVD which uses a documentary narration voiceover spoken by the German actor Sky du Mont. Other releases' narrators include the Dutch version, narrated by Belgian comedian Urbanus; the Indian version, narrated in Hindi and English by Indian actor Amitabh Bachchan, is titled Penguins: A Love Story; the Polish version, narrated by Polish actor Marek Kondrat; and the Swedish version, narrated by Swedish actor Gösta Ekman. The Filipino version is narrated by actress Sharon Cuneta and translated by Chris Martinez and Eugene Evasco; it is entitled Penguin, Penguin, Paano Ka Ginawa? (English: Penguin, Penguin, How Were You Made?) with the English title as the subtitle. The Filipino title is similar to that of a Philippine novel and film, Bata, Bata, Paano Ka Ginawa? (English: Child, Child, How Were You Made?)

Another difference between the various international versions involves the music. The original version uses an original experimental soundtrack by electronic music composer Émilie Simon, whereas the English-language version replaces it with an instrumental score by Alex Wurman. The Hindi version happens to use the music from the French version, and the Swedish version does that as well.

The Japanese release uses "Hikari no Niwa" by Chara as the theme song.

=== Reception ===
The first screening of the documentary was at the Sundance Film Festival in the United States on 21 January 2005. It was released in France the next week, on 26 January, where it earned a 4-star rating from AlloCiné, and was beaten at the box office only by The Aviator during its opening week.

The original French version was released in the Canadian province of Québec. Subsequently, Warner Bros and National Geographic's English-language version was released in the rest of North America on 24 June 2005, drawing huge praise from most critics who found it both informative and charming. March of the Penguins has an approval rating of 94% on review aggregator website Rotten Tomatoes, based on 184 reviews, and an average rating of 7.82/10. The website's critical consensus states, "Only the most hardened soul won't be moved by this heartwarming doc". Metacritic assigned the film a weighted average score of 79 out of 100, based on 39 critics, indicating "generally favorable reviews". The documentary also proved popular with filmgoers, distinguishing itself as one of the most successful documentaries of the season on a per-theatre basis: it became the second most successful documentary released in North America, after Fahrenheit 9/11, grossing over $77 million in the United States and Canada (in nominal dollars, from 1982 to the present.) It grossed over $127 million worldwide. It is the only film from Warner Independent to be rated G by the MPAA.

=== Home media ===
The French version of the documentary was released on DVD in France by Buena Vista Home Entertainment France on 26 July 2005 with a Blu-Ray release from Walt Disney Studios Home Entertainment France on 31 October 2008. It was later reissued on DVD on 1 June 2010 as a Disneynature product. The DVD extras address some of the criticisms the documentary had attracted, most notably by reframing the documentary as a scientific study and adding facts to what would otherwise have been a family film. This Region 2 release featured no English audio tracks or subtitles.

The English version was released on DVD in the United States by Warner Home Video on 29 November 2005. It was never released on VHS by Warner Home Video, due to A Very Long Engagement being the last VHS by Warner Independent. It however spawned a VHS in French locations, such as French Canadian regions. It was later released on Blu-Ray by Warner on 27 March 2007. Neither release contains the French-language version of the film.

An extra on the DVD issue was the controversial 1948 Bugs Bunny cartoon Frigid Hare, in which Bugs visits the South Pole and meets a young penguin fleeing an Inuk hunter. The cartoon is not frequently seen because of its stereotypical depiction of the Inuk hunter, but it was included here uncut and uncensored. This is substituted in the American release with 8 Ball Bunny, likewise uncut and uncensored. The American release also includes an episode of Crittercam that highlighted the emperor penguins.

=== Video games ===
In November 2006, the documentary was adapted into a video game by DSI Games for the Nintendo DS and Game Boy Advance platforms. It features Lemmings-like gameplay.

=== Parodies ===
A 2005 French ad for March of the Penguins shows a man describing the film to a co-worker while referring to the penguins as "emperors", which results in the coworker imagining hundreds of Napoleons travelling through Antarctica.

In 2007, a direct-to-DVD parody written and directed by Bob Saget called Farce of the Penguins was released. It is narrated by Samuel L. Jackson and features other stars providing voice-overs for the penguins. Although the film uses footage from actual nature documentaries about penguins, the parody was not allowed to include footage from March of the Penguins itself.

== Political and social interpretations ==
The documentary attracted some political and social commentary in which the penguins were viewed anthropomorphically as having similarities with, and even lessons for, human society. Michael Medved praised the documentary for promoting conservative family values by showing the value of stable parenthood. Medved's comments provoked responses by others, including Andrew Sullivan, who pointed out that the penguins are not in fact monogamous for more than one year, in reality practicing serial monogamy. Matt Walker of New Scientist pointed out that many emperor penguin "adoptions" of chicks are in fact kidnappings, as well as behaviours observed in other penguin species, such as ill treatment of weak chicks, prostitution, and ostracism of rare albino penguins. "For instance, while it is true that emperor penguins often adopt each other's chicks, they do not always do so in a way the moralisers would approve of." Sullivan and Walker both conclude that trying to use animal behavior as an example for human behavior is a mistake.

The director, Luc Jacquet, has condemned such comparisons between penguins and humans. Asked by the San Diego Union Tribune to comment on the documentary's use as "a metaphor for family values – the devotion to a mate, devotion to offspring, monogamy, self-denial", Jacquet responded: "I condemn this position. I find it intellectually dishonest to impose this viewpoint on something that's part of nature. It's amusing, but if you take the monogamy argument, from one season to the next, the divorce rate, if you will, is between 80 to 90 percent... the monogamy only lasts for the duration of one reproductive cycle. You have to let penguins be penguins and humans be humans."

Some of the controversy over this may be media driven. Rich Lowry, editor of National Review, reported in the magazine's blog that the BBC "have been harassing me for days over March of the Penguins ... about what, I'm not sure. I think to see if I would say on air that penguins are God's instruments to pull America back from the hell-fire, or something like that. As politely as I could I told her, 'Lady, they're just birds.'"

Another controversy involves those who feel that the emperor penguin's behavior can be viewed as an indication of intelligent design and those who consider it to be an example of evolution by natural selection in action. Steve Jones, professor of genetics at University College London, is quoted as saying, "Supporters of intelligent design think that if they see something they don't understand, it must be God; they fail to recognise that they themselves are part of evolution. It appeals to ignorance, which is why there is a lot of it in American politics at the moment." Author Susan Jacoby claims in her 2008 book, The Age of American Unreason, that the distributors of the film deliberately avoided using the word "evolution" in order to avoid backlash from the American religious right, and writes, "As it happens, the emperor penguin is literally a textbook example, cited in college-level biology courses, of evolution by means of natural selection and random mutation. ... The financial wisdom of avoiding any mention of evolution was borne out at the box office ..."

== Sequel ==
March of the Penguins 2: The Next Step (French: L'Empereur) was released by Disneynature in France on 15 February 2017, with narration by Lambert Wilson. The film was alternatively titled March of the Penguins 2: The Call.

Skipping a theatrical release in the US, the film was released as a Hulu exclusive on 23 March 2018, with Morgan Freeman reprising his role as narrator. It was later released on DVD in the UK by Lionsgate Films on 5 November.

The sequel was released to moderate success and received positive reviews, scoring 100% on Rotten Tomatoes based on five reviews.

== Accolades ==
Award	Date of ceremony	Category	Recipient(s)	Result	Ref.
Academy Awards	5 March 2006	Best Documentary Feature	Luc Jacquet and Yves Darondeau	Won	
ACE Eddie Awards	19 February 2006	Best Edited Documentary – Feature	Sabine Emiliani	Won	
BMI Film & TV Awards	17 May 2006	BMI Film Music Award	Alex Wurman	Won	
British Academy Film Awards	19 February 2006	Best Cinematography	Laurent Chalet and Jérôme Maison	Nominated	
British Academy Film Awards	19 February 2006	Best Editing	Sabine Emiliani	Nominated	
CAMIE Awards	7 January 2006	CAMIE Award – Theatrical Releases	Yves Darondeau, Christophe Lioud, Emmanuel Priou, Luc Jacquet, Morgan Freeman, Laurent Chalet, and Jerome Maison	Won	
César Awards	25 February 2006	Best First Feature Film	Luc Jacquet	Nominated	
César Awards	25 February 2006	Best Original Music	Émilie Simon	Nominated	
César Awards	25 February 2006	Best Editing	Sabine Emiliani	Nominated	
César Awards	25 February 2006	Best Sound	Laurent Quaglio and Gérard Lamps	Won	
Chicago Film Critics Association	9 January 2006	Best Documentary	March of the Penguins	Nominated	
Critics' Choice Awards	9 January 2006	Best Documentary Feature	March of the Penguins	Won	
Dallas–Fort Worth Film Critics Association	19 December 2005	Best Documentary	March of the Penguins	Runner-up	
David di Donatello	21 April 2006	Best European Film	Luc Jacquet	Nominated	
European Film Awards	2 December 2006	People's Choice Award	March of the Penguins	Nominated	
Golden Trailer Awards	1 June 2006	Best Documentary	March of the Penguins	Won	
Golden Trailer Awards	1 June 2006	Best Voice Over	March of the Penguins	Won	
International Cinephile Society	2006	Best Documentary	March of the Penguins	Runner-up	
LA Film Festival	22 June – 2 July 2005	Audience Award for Best International Feature	March of the Penguins	Won	
National Board of Review	10 January 2006	Best Documentary	March of the Penguins	Won	
National Board of Review	10 January 2006	Top Five Documentaries	March of the Penguins	Won	
New York Film Critics Circle	8 January 2006	Best Non-Fiction Film	March of the Penguins	Runner-up	
New York Film Critics Online	11 December 2005	Best Cinematography	March of the Penguins	Won	
Online Film Critics Society	16 January 2006	Best Documentary	March of the Penguins	Nominated	
Satellite Awards	17 December 2005	Best Motion Picture, Documentary	March of the Penguins	Nominated	
Satellite Awards	17 December 2005	Best Documentary DVD	March of the Penguins	Nominated	
St. Louis Film Critics Association	8 January 2006	Best Documentary	March of the Penguins	Won	
Victoires de la Musique	4 March 2006	Original Cinema or Television Soundtrack of the Year	Émilie Simon	Won	
Women Film Critics Circle	28 December 2005	Best Equality of the Sexes	March of the Penguins	Won	
Writers Guild of America Awards	4 February 2006	Best Documentary Screenplay	Jordan Roberts, Luc Jacquet, and Michel Fessler	Nominated	
Young Artist Awards	25 March 2006	Jackie Coogan Award for Outstanding Family Feature Documentary	March of the Penguins	Won	

== See also ==
- Ape and Super-Ape, a 1972 Dutch documentary film by Bert Haanstra about the differences and similarities between humans and animals, which also has extensive footage about the life of penguins on Antarctica, almost 30 years before March Of The Penguins was made.
- List of highest-grossing documentary films

== Funding ==
- IBM
- The Heising-Simons Foundation
- CPB
