= 2005 Los Angeles Film Critics Association Awards =

Annual US film awards ceremony

31st LAFCA Awards
- Date: December 2005

Highlights
- Best Picture: Brokeback Mountain

The 31st Los Angeles Film Critics Association Awards, given by the Los Angeles Film Critics Association, honored the best in film for 2005.

== Winners ==
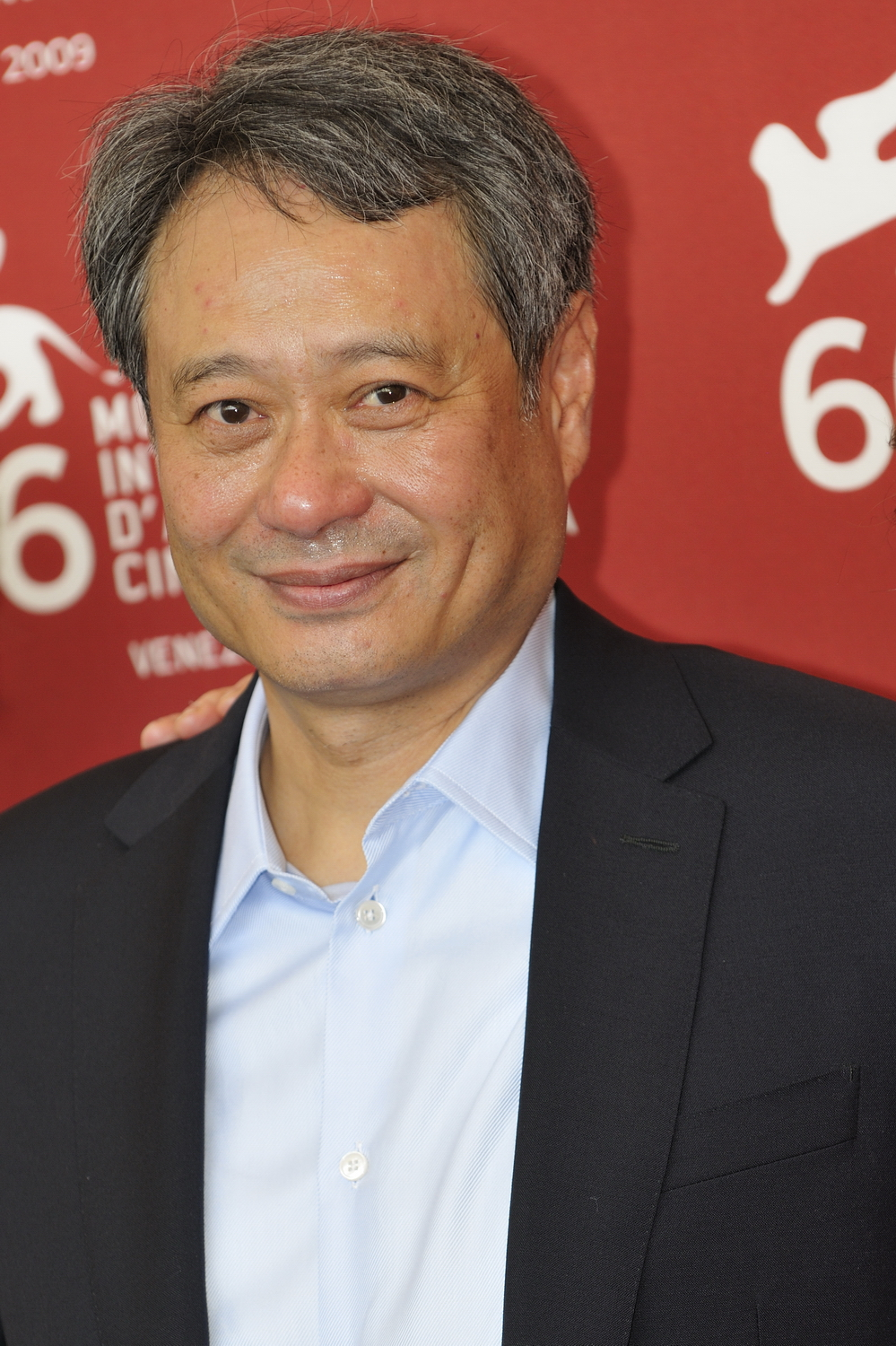
Ang Lee, Best Director winner

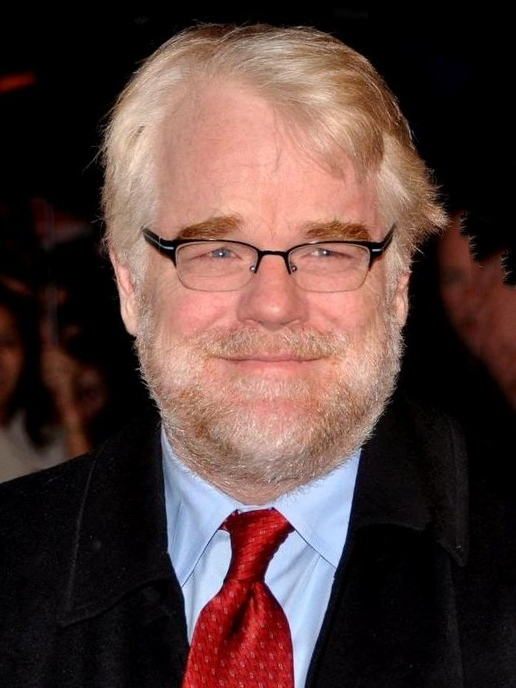
Philip Seymour Hoffman, Best Actor winner

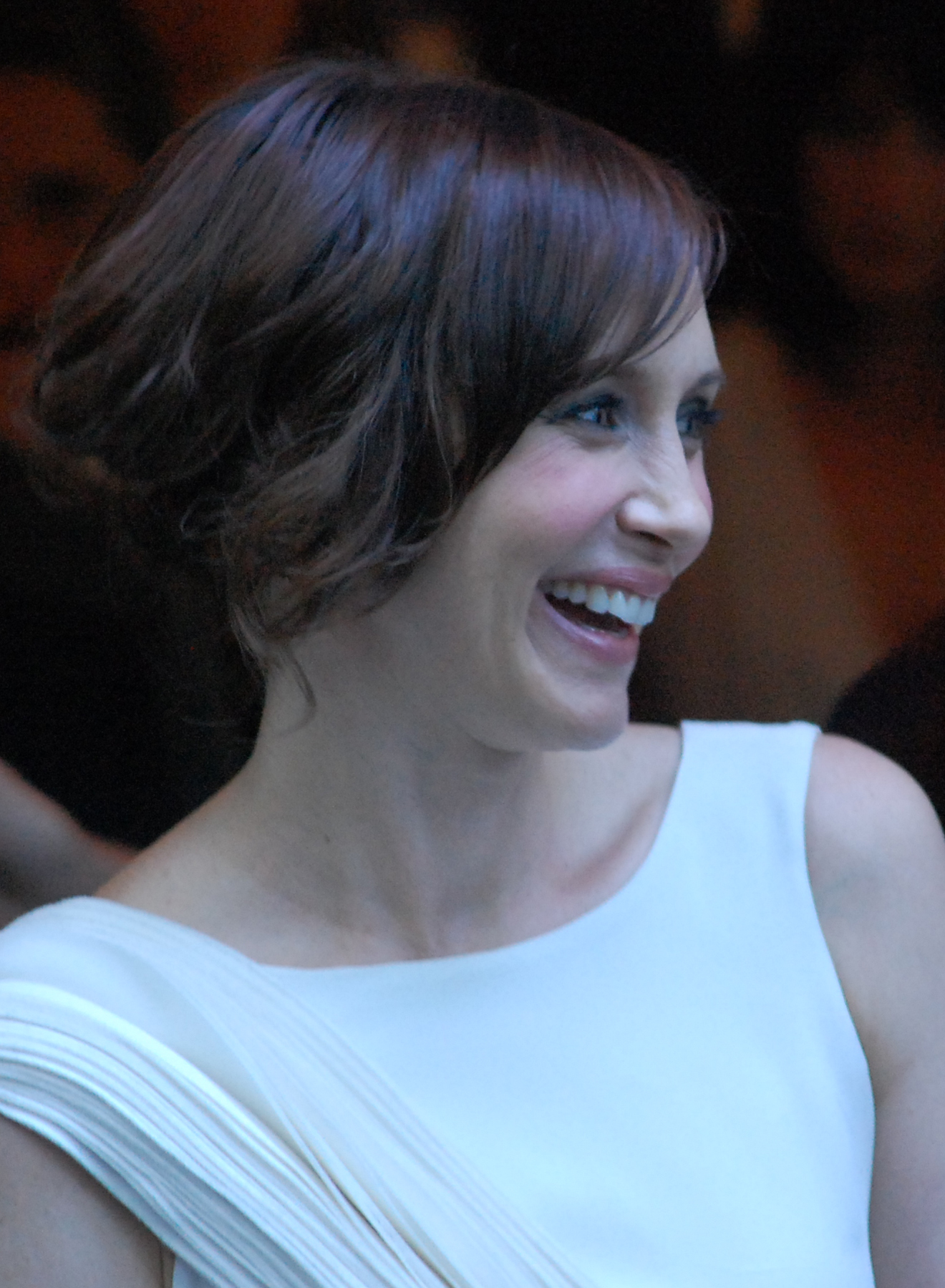
Vera Farmiga, Best Actress winner

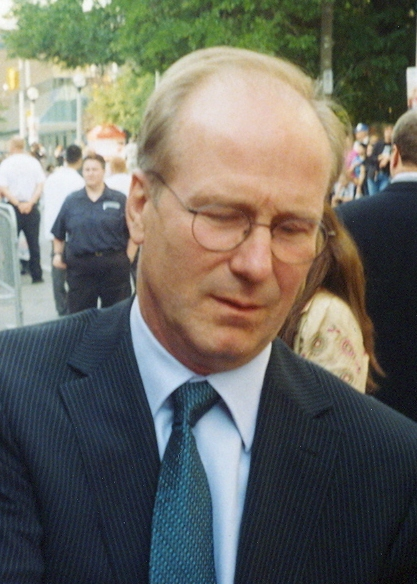
William Hurt, Best Supporting Actor winner

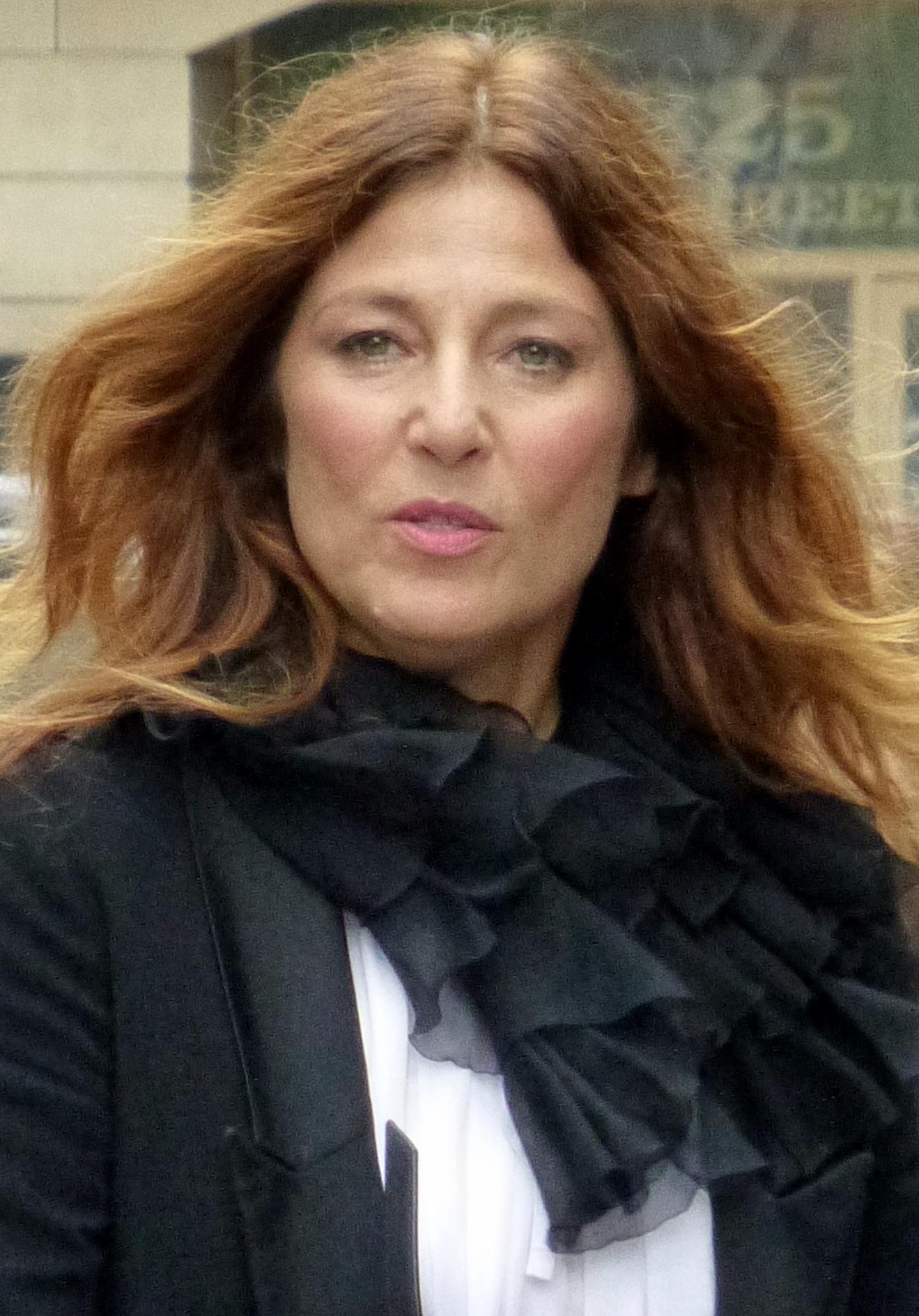
Catherine Keener, Best Supporting Actress winner

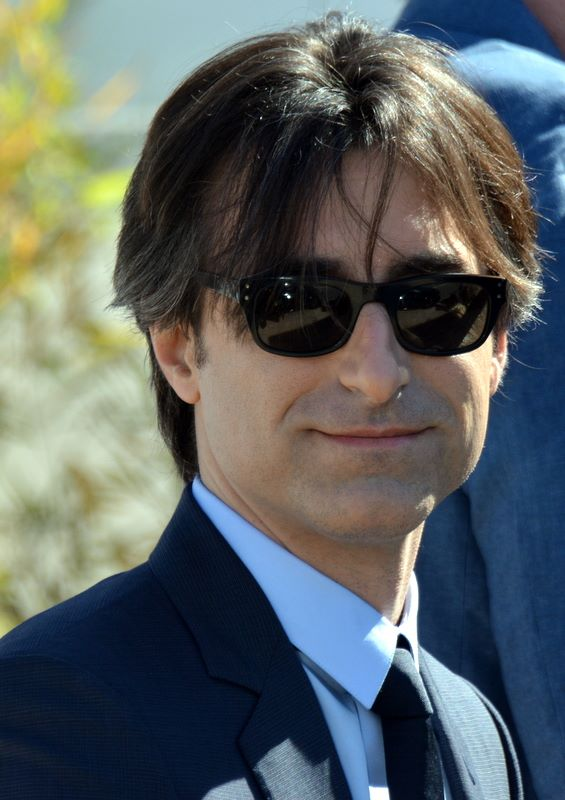
Noah Baumbach, Best Screenplay co-winner

- Best Picture:
  - Brokeback Mountain
  - Runner-up: A History of Violence
- Best Director:
  - Ang Lee – Brokeback Mountain
  - Runner-up: David Cronenberg – A History of Violence
- Best Actor:
  - Philip Seymour Hoffman – Capote
  - Runner-up: Heath Ledger – Brokeback Mountain
- Best Actress:
  - Vera Farmiga – Down to the Bone
  - Runner-up: Judi Dench – Mrs Henderson Presents
- Best Supporting Actor:
  - William Hurt – A History of Violence
  - Runner-up: Frank Langella – Good Night, and Good Luck.
- Best Supporting Actress:
  - Catherine Keener – The 40-Year-Old Virgin, The Ballad of Jack and Rose, Capote, and The Interpreter
  - Runner-up: Amy Adams – Junebug
- Best Screenplay (TIE):
  - Dan Futterman – Capote
  - Noah Baumbach – The Squid and the Whale
- Best Cinematography:
  - Robert Elswit – Good Night, and Good Luck.
  - Runner-up: Christopher Doyle, Pung-Leung Kwan, and Lai Yiu-fai – 2046
- Best Production Design:
  - William Chang – 2046
  - Runner-up: James D. Bissell – Good Night, and Good Luck.
- Best Music Score:
  - Joe Hisaishi and Youmi Kimura – Howl's Moving Castle (Hauru no ugoku shiro)
  - Runner-up: Ryuichi Sakamoto – Tony Takitani
- Best Foreign-Language Film:
  - Caché • France/Austria/Germany/Italy
  - Runner-up: 2046 • Hong Kong
- Best Documentary/Non-Fiction Film:
  - Grizzly Man
  - Runner-up: Enron: The Smartest Guys in the Room
- Best Animation:
  - Wallace & Gromit: The Curse of the Were-Rabbit
- The Douglas Edwards Experimental/Independent Film/Video Award:
  - Peter Watkins – La Commune (Paris, 1871)
- New Generation Award:
  - Terrence Howard
- Career Achievement Award:
  - Richard Widmark
- Special Citation:
  - Kevin Thomas for his contribution to film culture in Los Angeles.
  - David Shepard, Bruce Posner, and the Anthology Film Archives to honor Unseen Cinema, an unprecedented 8-disc collection of films from 1894 to 1941.
