= National Board of Review Awards 2005 =

Annual US film awards ceremony

77th NBR Awards

January 10, 2006

Best Film:
Good Night, and Good Luck.

The 77th National Board of Review Awards, honoring the best in film for 2005, were given on 10 January 2006.

== Top 10 films ==
1. Good Night, and Good Luck.
2. Brokeback Mountain
3. Capote
4. Crash
5. A History of Violence
6. Match Point
7. Memoirs of a Geisha
8. Munich
9. Syriana
10. Walk the Line

== Top foreign films ==
1. Paradise Now
2. 2046
3. Balzac and the Little Chinese Seamstress
4. Downfall (Der Untergang)
5. Walk on Water

== Top five documentaries ==
1. March of the Penguins
2. Ballets Russes
3. Grizzly Man
4. Mad Hot Ballroom
5. Murderball

== Winners ==
- Best Film:
  - Good Night, and Good Luck.
- Best Foreign Language Film:
  - Paradise Now
- Best Actor:
  - Philip Seymour Hoffman - Capote
- Best Actress:
  - Felicity Huffman - Transamerica
- Best Supporting Actor:
  - Jake Gyllenhaal - Brokeback Mountain
- Best Supporting Actress:
  - Gong Li - Memoirs of a Geisha
- Best Acting by an Ensemble:
  - Mrs Henderson Presents
- Breakthrough Performance Actor:
  - Terrence Howard - Crash, Get Rich or Die Tryin' and Hustle & Flow
- Breakthrough Performance Actress:
  - Q'Orianka Kilcher, The New World
- Best Director:
  - Ang Lee - Brokeback Mountain
- Best Directorial Debut:
  - Julian Fellowes, Separate Lies
- Best Documentary Feature:
  - March of the Penguins
- Best Animated Feature:
  - Corpse Bride
- Best Screenplay - Adapted:
  - Syriana - Stephen Gaghan
- Best Screenplay - Original:
  - The Squid and the Whale - Noah Baumbach
- Best Film or Mini-Series Made for Cable TV:
  - Lackawanna Blues
- Career Achievement Award:
  - Jane Fonda
- Billy Wilder Award for Excellence in Directing:
  - David Cronenberg
- Career Achievement - Music Composition:
  - Howard Shore
- Outstanding Achievement in Special Effects:
  - King Kong
- William K. Everson Award for Film History:
  - George Feltenstein
- Special Achievement in Producing:
  - Saul Zaentz
- Special Recognition of Films That Reflect Freedom of Expression:
  - Innocent Voices
  - The Untold Story of Emmett Louis Till
- Special Recognition For Excellence In Filmmaking:
  - Breakfast on Pluto
  - Cape of Good Hope
  - The Dying Gaul
  - Everything Is Illuminated
  - Hustle & Flow
  - Junebug
  - Layer Cake
  - Lord of War
  - Nine Lives
  - The Thing About My Folks
  - The Upside of Anger
