= GoldSpirit Awards =

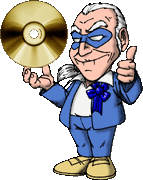
Original GoldSpirit

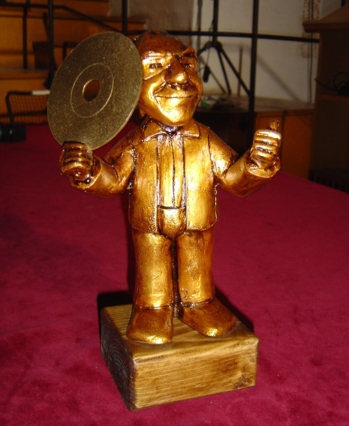
GoldSpirit Trophy

The GoldSpirit Awards, yearly granted through the website BSOSpirit, are devoted to soundtracks and film music fans.

BSOSpirit was released on 2001, as a Spanish website relating soundtracks and film music. Attempting to emphasize and recognize the role of the music in movies (contrary to other awards), since 2002, visitors can vote for their favorite scores and composers of the last year for the GoldSpirit Awards.

The name GoldSpirit comes from the contraction of Goldsmith (for the late composer Jerry Goldsmith, an homage to his figure) and Spirit (for BSOSpirit). BSO stands for Banda Sonora Original (in English, Original Soundtrack, OST).

== Categories ==
The list of categories in the GoldSpirit Awards is the following:

- Best Song
- Most Deceiving OST
- Best Edition/Re-edition of an OST from the Past
- Best Song Album
- Best Unreleased Score
- Best Record Label
- Best Horror Theme/Cue
- Best Drama Theme/Cue
- Best Action Theme/Cue
- Best Comedy Theme/Cue
- Best Epic Theme/Cue
- Best Romantic Theme/Cue
- Best Theme/Cue
- Best Score in Other Media (Videogames, TV, Documentary)
- Best Horror Score
- Best Drama Score
- Best Adventure/Action/Thriller Score
- Best Comedy Score
- Best Animation Score
- Best Fantasy/Sci-fi Score
- Best Spanish Score
- Most Revealing Newcomer
- Best Spanish Composer
- Best Composer
- Best Score

Also, since 2005, the winners are awarded in a special ceremony included as part of the International Conference on Film Music 'City of Úbeda', located by the end of July at Úbeda (Jaén, Spain).
