= The Squid and the Whale =

2005 film by Noah Baumbach

- Theatrical release poster
- Directed by: Noah Baumbach
- Written by: Noah Baumbach
- Produced by: Wes Anderson; Charlie Corwin; Clara Markowicz; Peter Newman
- Starring: Jeff Daniels; Laura Linney; Jesse Eisenberg; Owen Kline; William Baldwin; Anna Paquin
- Cinematography: Robert D. Yeoman
- Edited by: Tim Streeto
- Music by: Britta Phillips; Dean Wareham
- Production companies: Original Media; Ambush Entertainment; American Empirical Pictures; Peter Newman-Internal Productions; Andrew Lauren Productions
- Distributed by: Samuel Goldwyn Films; Sony Pictures Releasing International; Destination Films
- Release dates: January 23, 2005 (Sundance); December 16, 2005 (United States)
- Running time: 81 minutes
- Country: United States
- Language: English
- Budget: $1.5 million
- Box office: $11.2 million

The Squid and the Whale is a 2005 American independent comedy-drama film written and directed by Noah Baumbach and produced by Wes Anderson. It tells the semi-autobiographical story of two boys in Brooklyn dealing with their parents' divorce in 1986. The film is named after the giant squid and sperm whale diorama housed at the American Museum of Natural History, which is seen in the film. The film was shot on Super 16 mm, mostly using a handheld camera.

At the 2005 Sundance Film Festival, the film won awards for best dramatic direction and screenwriting, and was nominated for the Grand Jury Prize. Baumbach later was nominated for an Academy Award for Best Original Screenplay. The film received six Independent Spirit Award nominations and three Golden Globe nominations. Baumbach became one of the few screenwriters to ever sweep "The Big Four" critics awards (Los Angeles Film Critics' Association, National Board of Review, National Society of Film Critics, and New York Film Critics' Circle).

== Plot ==
In 1986, arrogant, twice-divorced, failing novelist Bernard Berkman lives in Park Slope, Brooklyn with his third wife, Joan, and their two sons, sixteen-year-old Walt, and twelve-year-old Frank. Bernard's career is in jeopardy due to declining sales, and he is struggling to find a new agent. Meanwhile, Joan has begun publishing her own work to widespread acclaim, creating tension between them.

One day, Bernard and Joan reveal to Walt and Frank that they are separating and Bernard is moving out. The parents initially agree upon a joint custody arrangement that allows them to evenly spend time with their children, but following the separation, their relationship becomes more combative than before.

Joan begins dating Frank's tennis instructor, Ivan, while Bernard begins an inappropriate relationship with one of his students, Lili, even going as far as to allow her to move in with him. The conflict between the parents soon leads to the brothers disputing as well; Frank sides with Joan, while Walt, who idolizes Bernard, blames her for the deterioration of their family, especially after she admits to having a series of affairs.

Both boys covertly struggle to cope with the stress of the divorce. Frank begins to compulsively masturbate at school, drink beer, and emulate Ivan's mannerisms. Walt, who is developing an attraction to Lili, admonishes and effectively breaks up with his girlfriend for wanting a more committed relationship with him.

Walt performs "Hey You" by Pink Floyd at his school's talent show, claiming it as an original song, and wins first prize. However, upon discovering that he plagiarized the song, school administration arranges a meeting with his parents, where all parties agree he should begin seeing a therapist.

At Walt's first therapy session, he is asked to share a positive memory. Walt recalls that when he was a child, his mother would take him to the American Museum of Natural History. The young Walt was scared of the giant squid and sperm whale diorama, and would hide his eyes behind his hands when they passed it. At home, his mother would describe the diorama to him; hearing her speak about it made him feel less afraid. While talking, Walt gradually realizes that his mother has always been present for him, while his father has not.

After a heated argument between Bernard and Joan, Bernard rushes outside in pursuit of the family cat who escaped, then collapses on the street. Paramedics are called, and Walt accompanies him in the ambulance. While at the hospital, Bernard continues to demand the majority of Walt's attention and implores he stay with him for the rest of the day. Walt instead rushes to the museum and finds the squid and whale diorama, now able to look at it.

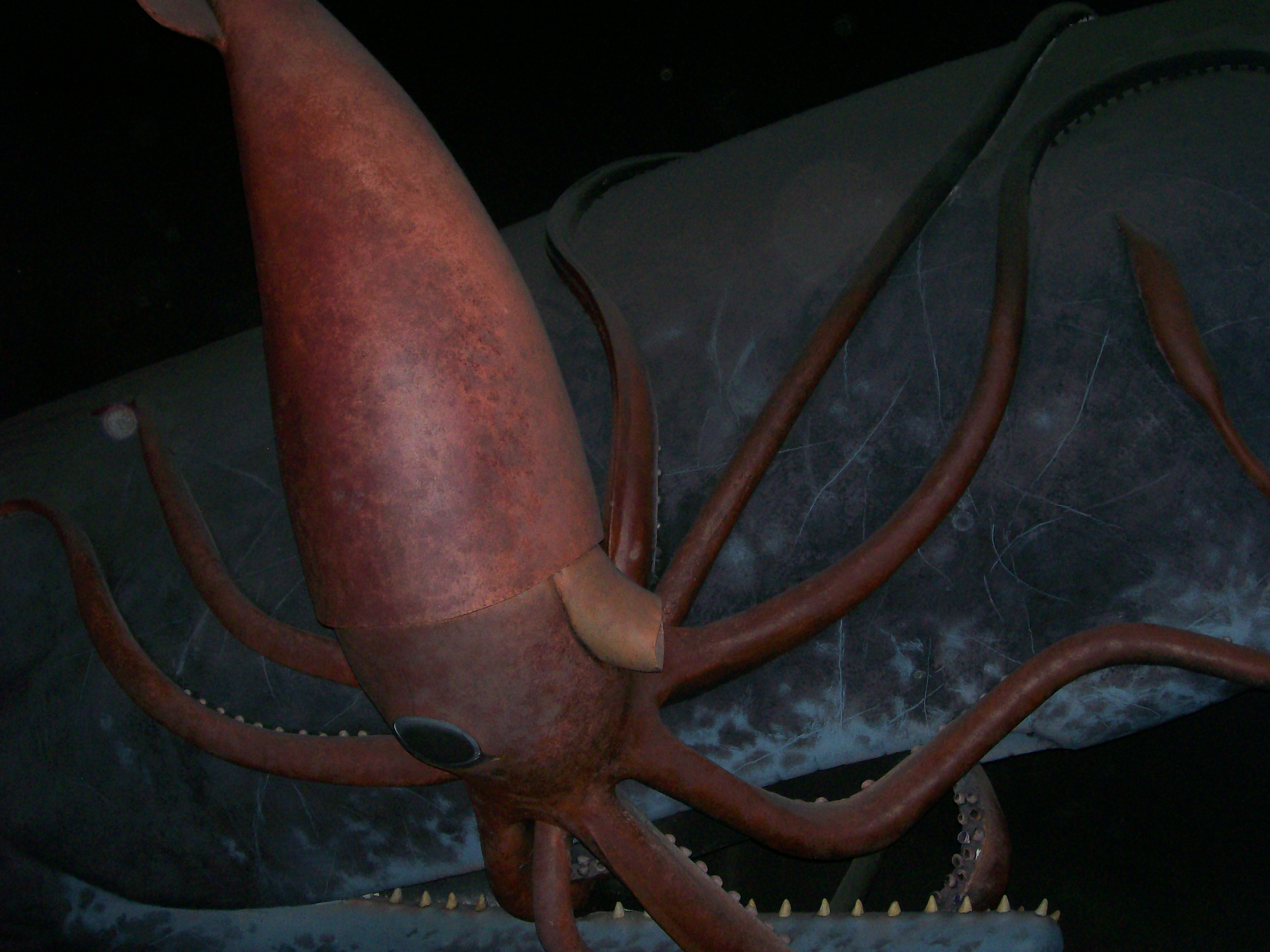
The giant squid and whale diorama at the American Museum of Natural History.

== Cast ==
- Jeff Daniels as Bernard Berkman
- Laura Linney as Joan Berkman
- Jesse Eisenberg as Walt Berkman
- Owen Kline as Frank Berkman
- Anna Paquin as Lili
- William Baldwin as Ivan
- Halley Feiffer as Sophie Greenberg
- Ken Leung as School Therapist
- David Benger as Carl
- Adam Rose as Otto
- Peter Newman as Mr. Greenberg
- Peggy Gormley as Mrs. Greenberg
- Greta Kline as Greta Greenberg
- Maryann Plunkett as Ms. Lemon
- Alexandra Daddario as Pretty Girl

== Production ==
Bill Murray, a frequent collaborator to producer Wes Anderson, was considered for the role of Bernard Berkman. John Turturro was also considered for the role.

Noah Baumbach looked to documentaries, French New Wave films, John Cassavetes, and early Martin Scorsese films when envisioning the style of the film. He shot the film in Super 16 rather than digital video "to give the film an authentic 1980’s feel", commenting "Super 16 also feels lived-in, instantly looks like an older film. I wanted to handhold the movie, but steadily, so you detect only a hint of movement. It added to the immediacy of the whole thing."

The screenplay was intentionally pared down. Baumbach explained, "I really wanted this [film] to be an experience that people live through. Which is how people talk about action films. In some ways, maybe the cinematic equivalent of that would be not to give people moments of reflection. So that you’re taken through each scene, and then you’re right into another. A lot of scenes start on the dialogue, and the dialogue prelapses the next scene — So you never have time. There’s no sun rises over Brooklyn shot, no establishing shot." Baumbach has said the film is semi-autobiographical.

== Reception ==
On Rotten Tomatoes, the film has a 91% approval rating, based on 150 reviews, with an average rating of 7.90/10. The site's critical consensus reads, "This is a piercingly honest, acidly witty look at divorce and its impact on a family." On Metacritic, the film has a weighted average score of 82 out of 100, based on 37 critics, indicating "universal acclaim".

On an episode of Ebert & Roeper, both critics praised the film and gave it a "two thumbs up" rating. Premiere critic Glenn Kenny praised the film, writing, "It's a rare film that can be convincingly tender, bitterly funny, and ruthlessly cutting over the course of fewer than 90 minutes. The Squid and the Whale not only manages this, it also contains moments that sock you with all three qualities at the same time." Time critic Richard Corliss wrote, "The Squid and the Whale is domestic tragedy recollected as comedy: a film whose catalog of deceits and embarrassments, and of love pratfalling over itself, makes it as (excruciatingly) painful as it is (exhilaratingly) funny."

The English Indie folk band Noah and the Whale takes its name from a combination of the director's name (Noah Baumbach) and the film's title.

=== Accolades ===
Award	Date of ceremony	Category	Recipients	Result	Ref.
Academy Awards	5 March 2006	Best Original Screenplay	Noah Baumbach	Nominated	
Critics Choice Movie Awards	9 January 2006	Best Screenplay	Noah Baumbach	Nominated	
Critics Choice Movie Awards	9 January 2006	Best Young Actor	Jesse Eisenberg	Nominated	
Critics Choice Movie Awards	9 January 2006	Best Young Actor	Owen Kline	Nominated	
Golden Globe Awards	16 January 2006	Best Motion Picture – Musical or Comedy	The Squid and the Whale	Nominated	
Golden Globe Awards	16 January 2006	Best Actor – Motion Picture Musical or Comedy	Jeff Daniels	Nominated	
Golden Globe Awards	16 January 2006	Best Actress – Motion Picture Comedy or Musical	Laura Linney	Nominated	
Gotham Awards	30 November 2005	Best Ensemble Cast	William Baldwin, Jeff Daniels, Jesse Eisenberg, Owen Kline, Laura Linney, Anna Paquin	Won	
Independent Spirit Awards	4 March 2006	Best Feature	The Squid and the Whale	Nominated	
Independent Spirit Awards	4 March 2006	Best Director	Noah Baumbach	Nominated	
Independent Spirit Awards	4 March 2006	Best Screenplay	Noah Baumbach	Nominated	
Independent Spirit Awards	4 March 2006	Best Male Lead	Jeff Daniels	Nominated	
Independent Spirit Awards	4 March 2006	Best Female Lead	Laura Linney	Nominated	
Independent Spirit Awards	4 March 2006	Best Supporting Male	Jesse Eisenberg	Nominated	
Los Angeles Film Critics Association Awards	11 December 2005	Best Screenplay	Noah Baumbach	Won	
National Board of Review Awards	10 January 2006	Best Original Screenplay	Noah Baumbach	Won	
National Society of Film Critics	7 January 2006	Best Screenplay	Noah Baumbach	Won	
New York Film Critics Circle Awards	8 January 2006	Best Screenplay	Noah Baumbach	Won	
Satellite Awards	17 December 2005	Best Original Screenplay	Noah Baumbach	Nominated	
Satellite Awards	17 December 2005	Best Supporting Actress – Drama	Laura Linney	Won	
Sundance Film Festival	29 January 2005	Grand Jury Prize	Noah Baumbach	Nominated	
Sundance Film Festival	29 January 2005	Best Director	Noah Baumbach	Won	
Sundance Film Festival	29 January 2005	Waldo Salt Screenwriting Award	Noah Baumbach	Won	
Writers Guild of America Awards	14 February 2006	Best Original Screenplay	Noah Baumbach	Nominated	

== Home media ==
The film was released on DVD on March 21, 2006 by Sony Pictures Home Entertainment. The DVD includes a 45-minute commentary with director Noah Baumbach, another 40-minute commentary with Baumbach and Phillip Lopate, cast interviews, and trailers. In 2013 Mill Creek Entertainment released the film for the first time on Blu-ray in a 2 pack set with Running with Scissors. All extras were dropped for the Blu-ray release.

The Criterion Collection re-released the film on DVD and Blu-ray on November 22, 2016 which included new interviews with Baumbach and actors Jeff Daniels, Jesse Eisenberg, Owen Kline and Laura Linney; a new conversation about the score and other music in the film between Baumbach and composers Dean Wareham and Britta Phillips; a 2005 documentary titled Behind The Squid and the Whale; audition footage; and the original trailers.

== Music ==
The soundtrack features two songs by Loudon Wainwright III and one by Kate & Anna McGarrigle. It reuses Tangerine Dream's "Love on a Real Train", from Risky Business, for the scenes of Frank's sexual awakenings. Other contemporary popular music is played in the background of scenes, such as The Cars' "Drive" and Bryan Adams' "Run to You". "Figure Eight", from Schoolhouse Rock, is used as both an instrumental and a vocal. Pink Floyd's "Hey You" is heard several times in the movie, since it plays a role in the plot and is cited by Walt as capturing his emotional state. Both the original version, and diegetic performances by Jesse Eisenberg and Owen Kline, are used. Baumbach originally wanted to use The Who's "Behind Blue Eyes" instead but he could not secure the rights.

Soundtrack

1. "Park Slope" – Britta Phillips & Dean Wareham
2. "Courting Blues" – Bert Jansch
3. "Holland Tunnel" – John Phillips
4. "Lullaby" – Loudon Wainwright III
5. "Heart Like a Wheel" – Kate & Anna McGarrigle
6. "The Bright New Year" – Bert Jansch
7. "Drive" – The Cars
8. "Let's Go" – The Feelies
9. "Figure Eight" – Blossom Dearie
10. "Come Sing Me a Happy Song to Prove We All Can Get Along the Lumpy, Bumpy, Long & Dusty Road" – Bert Jansch
11. "Hey You " – Pink Floyd (Performed by Dean Wareham)
12. "Family Conference" – Britta Phillips & Dean Wareham
13. "Street Hassle" – Lou Reed
14. "The Swimming Song" – Loudon Wainwright III
