= San Diego Film Critics Society Awards 2005 =

Annual US film awards ceremony

10th SDFCS Awards

December, 2005

Best Film:
King Kong

The 10th San Diego Film Critics Awards, honouring the best in film for 2005, were given in December, 2005 by the San Diego Film Critics Society.

== Winners ==
- Best Actor:
  - Philip Seymour Hoffman – Capote
- Best Actress:
  - Joan Allen – The Upside of Anger
- Best Animated Film:
  - Howl's Moving Castle (Hauru no ugoku shiro)
- Best Director:
  - Bennett Miller – Capote
- Best Documentary Film:
  - Grizzly Man
- Best Film:
  - King Kong
- Best Foreign Language Film:
  - Innocent Voices (Voces inocentes) • Mexico/United States/Puerto Rico
- Best Screenplay, Adapted:
  - Dan Futterman – Capote
- Best Screenplay, Original:
  - Shane Black – Kiss Kiss Bang Bang
- Best Cinematography:
  - Emmanuel Lubezki – The New World
- Best Editing:
  - Ronald Sanders – A History of Violence
- Best Production Design:
  - Jeanette Scott – Sin City
- Best Supporting Actor:
  - Jeffrey Wright – Broken Flowers
- Best Supporting Actress:
  - Rachel Weisz – The Constant Gardener
- Special Award:
  - Jake Gyllenhaal – for his body of work in the year, Brokeback Mountain, Jarhead, and Proof
