= 2005 New York Film Critics Circle Awards =

71st New York Film Critics Circle Awards

71st New York Film Critics Circle Awards
- Date: January 8, 2006

Highlights
- Best Film: Brokeback Mountain, Howl's Moving Castle (Hauru no ugoku shiro) (animated)
- Best Direction: Ang Lee; Brokeback Mountain
- Best Actor: Heath Ledger; Brokeback Mountain
- Best Actress: Reese Witherspoon; Walk the Line

The 71st New York Film Critics Circle Awards, honoring the best in film for 2005, were announced on 12 December 2005 and presented on 8 January 2006.

== Winners ==
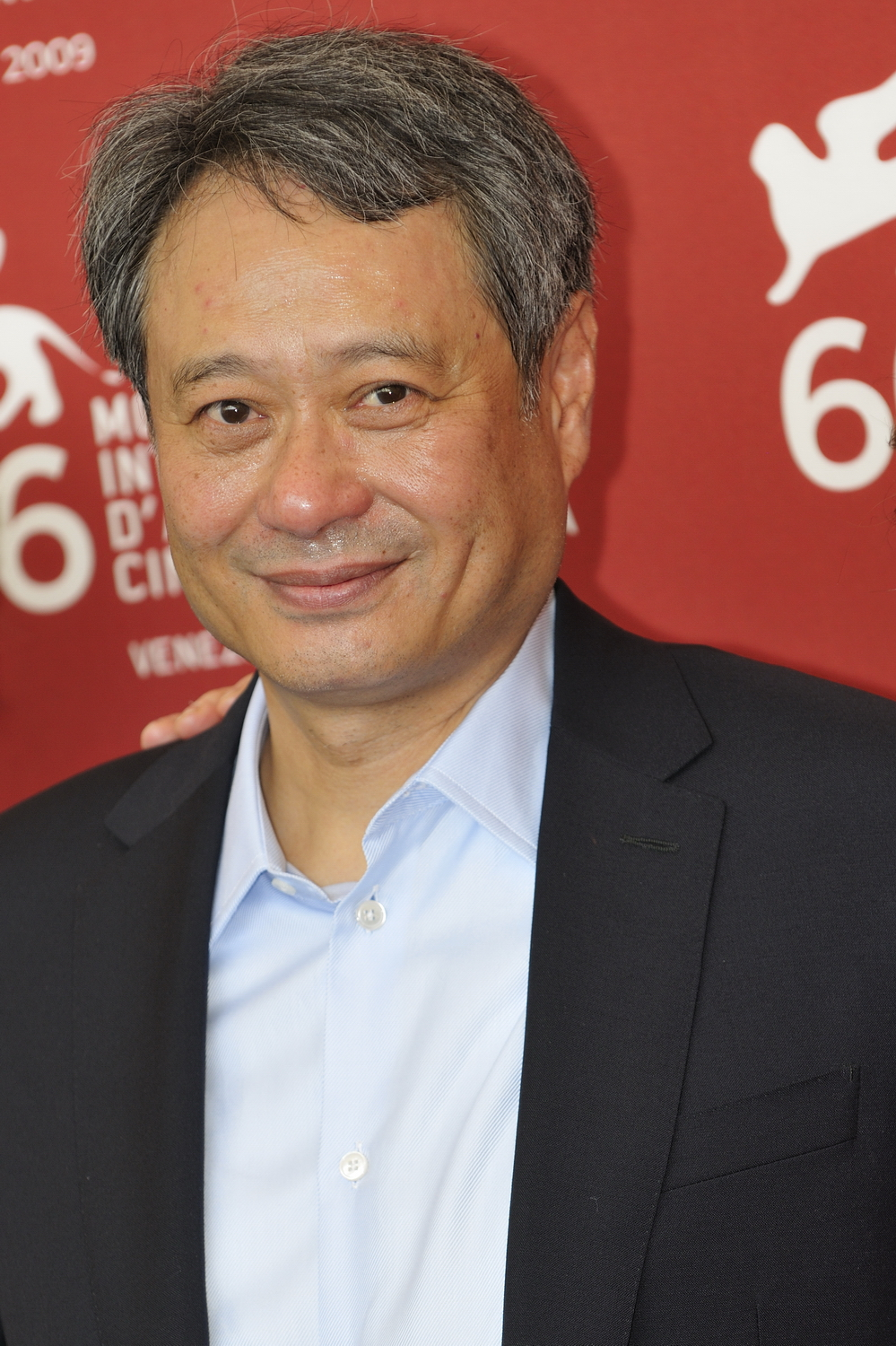
Ang Lee, Best Director winner

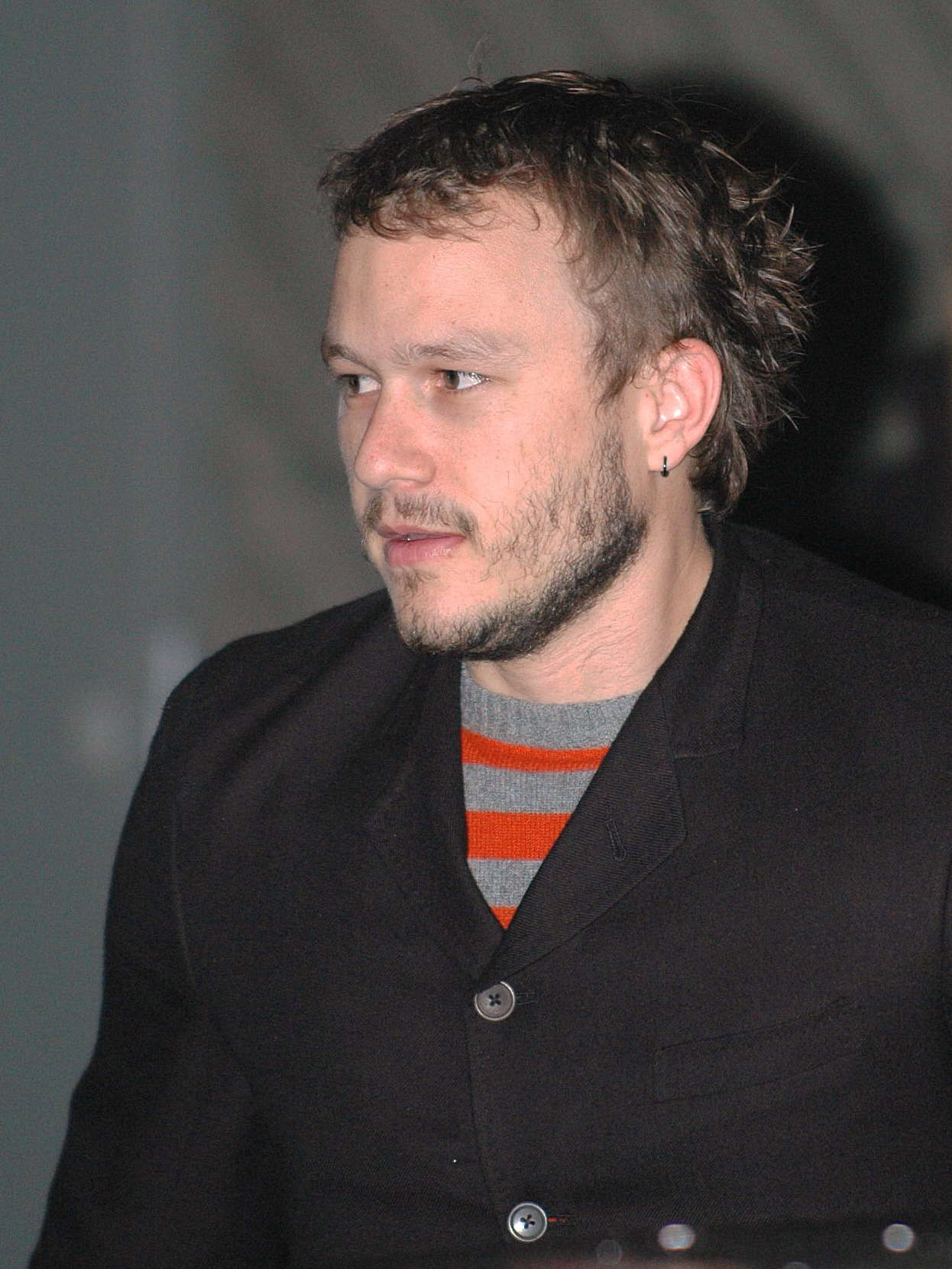
Heath Ledger, Best Actor winner

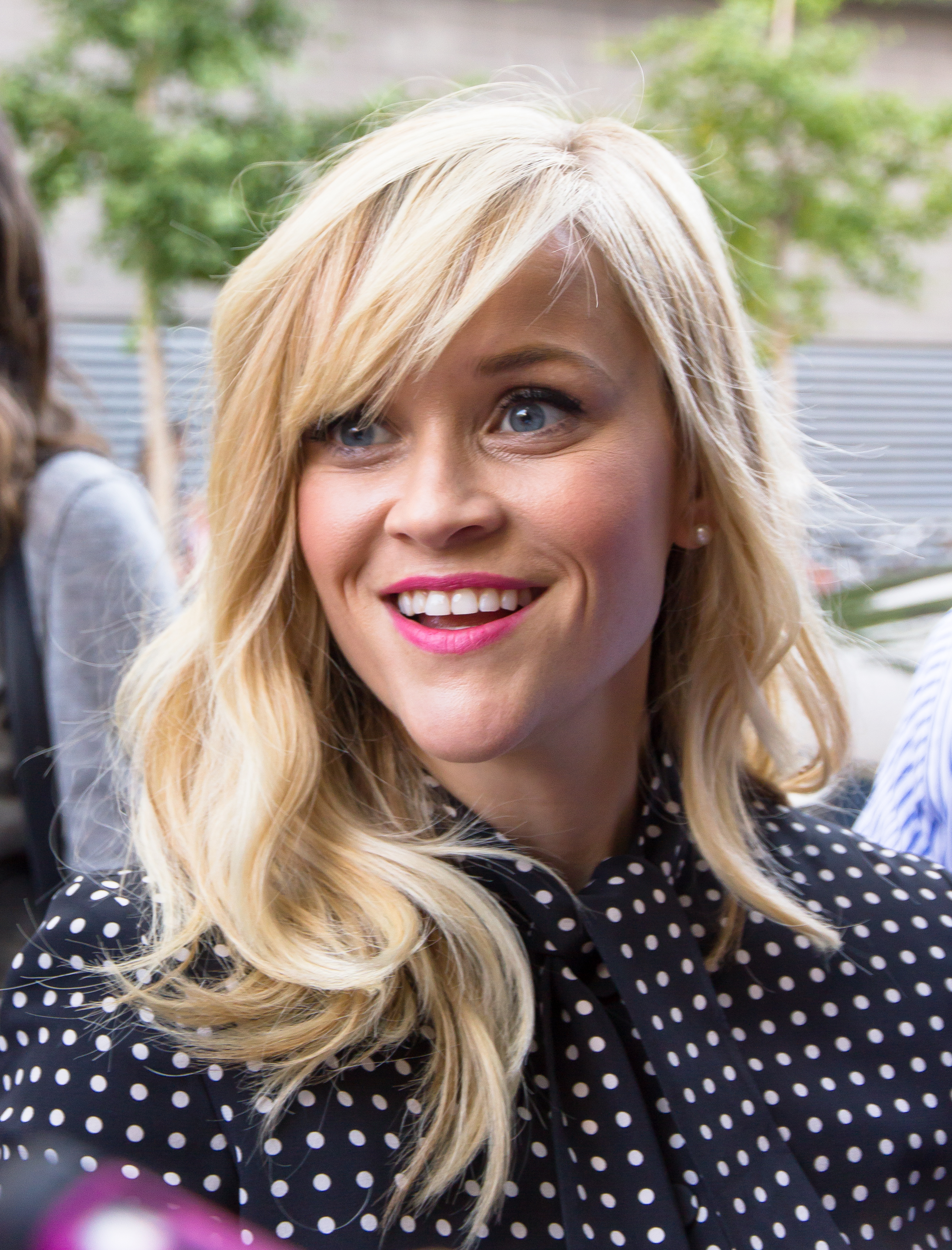
Reese Witherspoon, Best Actress winner

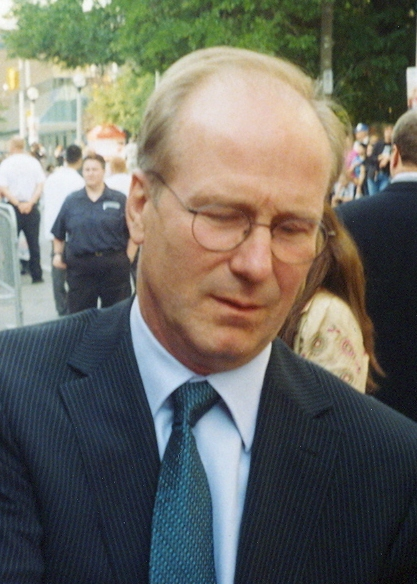
William Hurt, Best Supporting Actor winner

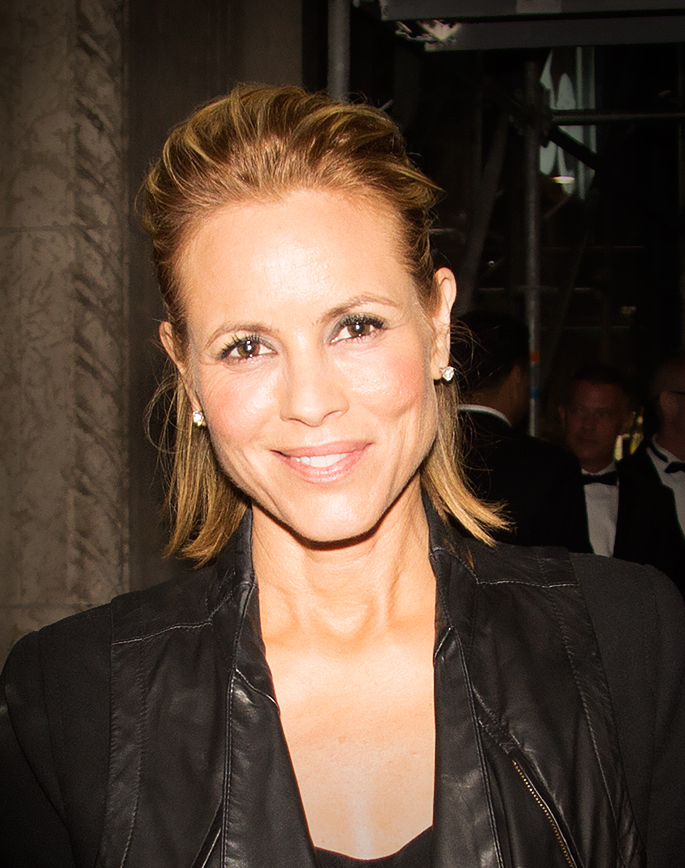
Maria Bello, Best Supporting Actress winner

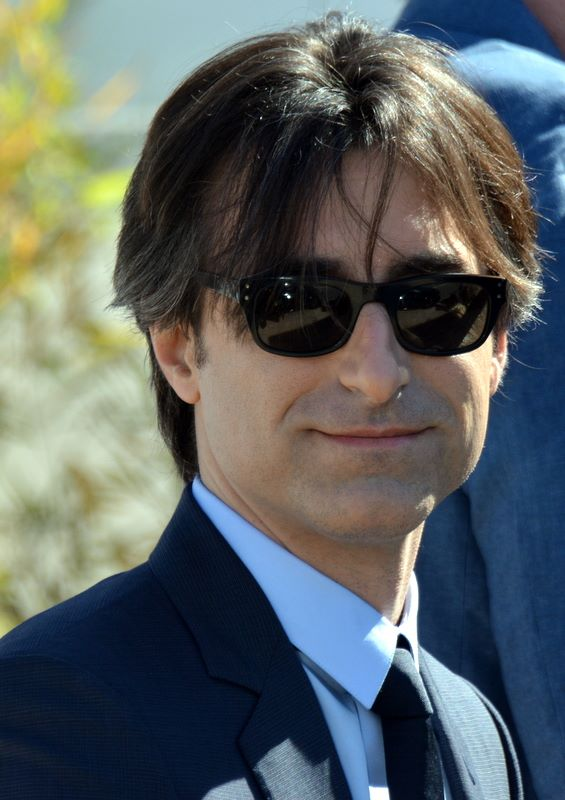
Noah Baumbach, Best Screenplay winner

- Best Actor:
  - Heath Ledger – Brokeback Mountain
  - Runners-up: Philip Seymour Hoffman – Capote and Viggo Mortensen – A History of Violence
- Best Actress:
  - Reese Witherspoon – Walk the Line
  - Runners-up: Emmanuelle Devos – Kings and Queen (Rois et reine) and Zhang Ziyi – 2046 and Memoirs of a Geisha
- Best Animated Feature:
  - Howl's Moving Castle (Hauru no ugoku shiro)
  - Runners-up: Wallace & Gromit: The Curse of the Were-Rabbit and Corpse Bride
- Best Cinematography:
  - Christopher Doyle, Lai Yiu Fai, and Kwan Pun Leung – 2046
  - Runners-up: Robert Elswit – Good Night, and Good Luck. and Emmanuel Lubezki – The New World
- Best Director:
  - Ang Lee – Brokeback Mountain
  - Runners-up: David Cronenberg – A History of Violence and Steven Spielberg – Munich
- Best Film:
  - Brokeback Mountain
  - Runners-up: A History of Violence and Good Night, and Good Luck.
- Best First Film:
  - Bennett Miller – Capote
  - Runners-up: Miranda July – Me and You and Everyone We Know and Phil Morrison – Junebug
- Best Foreign Language Film:
  - 2046 • China/France/Germany/Hong Kong
  - Runners-up: Caché • France/Austria and Look at Me (Comme une image) • France
- Best Non-Fiction Film (tie):
  - Grizzly Man
  - The White Diamond
  - Runners-up: March of the Penguins and The Aristocrats
- Best Screenplay:
  - Noah Baumbach – The Squid and the Whale
  - Runners-up: Larry McMurtry and Diana Ossana – Brokeback Mountain and Tony Kushner and Eric Roth – Munich
- Best Supporting Actor:
  - William Hurt – A History of Violence
  - Runners-up: Mathieu Amalric – Munich and Terrence Howard – Crash
- Best Supporting Actress:
  - Maria Bello – A History of Violence
  - Runners-up: Catherine Keener – The 40-Year-Old Virgin, The Ballad of Jack and Rose, and Capote and Diane Keaton – The Family Stone
