= National Register of Historic Places listings in Yadkin County, North Carolina =

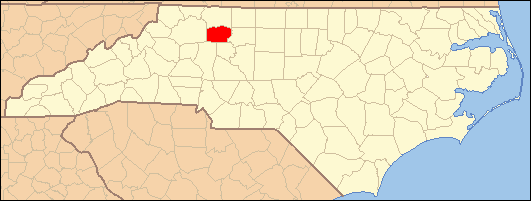

This list includes properties and districts listed on the National Register of Historic Places in Yadkin County, North Carolina. Click the "Map of all coordinates" link to the right to view a Google map of all properties and districts with latitude and longitude coordinates in the table below.

== Current listings ==
This National Park Service list is complete through NPS recent listings posted March 14, 2025.

	Name on the Register	Image	Date listed	Location	City or town	Description
1	Davis Brothers Store	Davis Brothers Store	January 21, 1994 (#93001543)	E. Main St. N side, just E of jct. with Flint Hill Rd. 36°13′00″N 80°30′27″W	East Bend	
2	Donnaha Site		December 6, 1978 (#78001987)	Western side of the Yadkin River, east of East Bend; 36°13′53″N 80°26′29″W	East Bend	
3	Durrett-Jarratt House		May 23, 1997 (#97000474)	0.35 miles SW of jct. of NC 1605 and NC 1569; 36°07′08″N 80°29′59″W	Enon	
4	Glenwood	Glenwood	August 13, 1979 (#79001766)	E of Enon on SR 1549; 36°09′09″N 80°28′02″W	Enon	Plantation estate with Greek Revival house from 1851
5	Morse and Wade Building		April 6, 2005 (#05000269)	100 E. Main St. 36°12′59″N 80°30′27″W	East Bend	
6	Richmond Hill Law School	Richmond Hill Law School	October 15, 1970 (#70000483)	North of Richmond Hill on SR 1530; 36°16′04″N 80°36′46″W	Richmond Hill	
7	Second Yadkin County Jail	Second Yadkin County Jail	July 21, 1988 (#88001113)	241 E. Hemlock St. 36°08′09″N 80°39′23″W	Yadkinville	
8	White House		June 1, 1982 (#82003534)	Shallowford Rd. 36°05′01″N 80°31′43″W	Huntsville	

== See also ==
- National Register of Historic Places listings in North Carolina
- List of National Historic Landmarks in North Carolina
