= National Trail Conference =

- Conference: IHSA
- Founded: 1935
- No. of teams: 12
- Region: East Central Illinois

The National Trail Conference (NTC) is a historic high school conference in east central Illinois. The conference participates in athletics and activities in the Illinois High School Association (IHSA). The conference comprises eleven public high schools and one private high school with small enrollments in portions of Effingham, Fayette, Shelby, Cumberland and Clay counties.

Founded in 1935, the National Trail Conference was named after the National Road, which runs through the heart of the conference in Effingham and Fayette Counties and coincides with U.S. Route 40.

While none of the schools in the NTC (as it is informally known) sponsor football, the conference is well-recognized around the state for having strong boys and girls basketball teams. The Teutopolis Lady Shoes have won five state titles, the second-most of any team in Illinois, while the Teutopolis boys have won one state title (in 1986) and numerous regional and sectional crowns. Effingham St. Anthony, Stewardson-Strasburg, and St. Elmo have also made appearances at the Illinois high school boys basketball championship, while Cowden-Herrick/Beecher City (a co-op between two member schools in girls basketball) has made two appearances (2010, 2012) in the girls final four.

== Member Schools ==
National Trail Conference Members (clickable map)

School	Location (Population)	Mascot	Colors	County	2017-18 Enrollment	IHSA Classes 2/3/4	IHSA Music Class	IHSA Cheerleading Class	Year Joined	Previous Conference
Altamont High School	Altamont, IL (2,319)	Indians		Effingham	260	A/1A/1A	D	Small squad	1935	
Beecher City High School	Beecher City, IL (463)	Bobcats		Effingham	90	A/1A/1A	D	Small squad	1935	
Brownstown High School (Illinois)	Brownstown, IL (759)	Bombers		Fayette	95	A/1A/1A	D	Small squad	1935	
Cowden-Herrick High School	Cowden, IL (629)	Bobcats		Shelby	106	A/1A/1A	D	Small Squad	1971	none (new school)
Dieterich High School	Dieterich, IL (617)	Movin' Maroons		Effingham	111	A/1A/1A	D	Small squad	2009	Midland Trail
Neoga High School	Neoga, IL (1,639)	Indians		Cumberland	188	A/1A/1A	D	Small squad	1935	
North Clay High School	Louisville, IL (1,139)	Cardinals		Clay	198	A/1A/1A	D	Small Squad	2016	Midland Trail
St. Anthony High School (Illinois)	Effingham, IL (12,328)	Bulldogs		Effingham	190 / 313.50 (multiplied)	A/1A/2A	D	Small squad	1935	
St. Elmo High School	St. Elmo, IL (1,426)	Eagles		Fayette	124	A/1A/1A	D	Small squad	1935	
South Central High School (Illinois)	Farina, IL (518)	Cougars		Fayette	186	A/1A/1A	D	Small squad	2012	Midland Trail
Stewardson-Strasburg High School	Strasburg, IL (467)	Hatchets		Shelby	105	A/1A/1A	D	Small squad	1951	none (new school)
Windsor High School (Illinois)	Windsor, IL (1,187)	Hatchets		Shelby	96	A/1A/1A	C	Small squad	1935	

Sources:IHSA Conferences and IHSA Member Schools Directory

== Former Members ==
School	Location	Mascot	Colors	County	Year Joined	Previous Conference	Year Left	Conference Joined
Herrick	Herrick, IL	Eagles		Shelby	1935		1971	none (consolidated into Cowden-Herrick)
Strasburg	Strasburg, IL	Cardinals		Shelby	1935		1951	none (consolidated into Stewardson-Strasburg)
Teutopolis High School	Teutopolis, IL	Wooden Shoes		Effingham	1935		2012	Independents

== History ==
The National Trail Conference (NTC) was established in 1935. Nine of the twelve schools — all except Dieterich, South Central, and North Clay — have been members since the conference's founding. Strasburg and Herrick high schools closed in 1951 and 1971, respectively, through consolidation. Their respective consolidations (Stewardson-Strasburg and Cowden-Herrick) would retain membership in the conference.

The conference's membership stayed stable from 1971 until the 2009 season, when Dieterich became a full-time member after leaving the Midland Trail Conference. Teutopolis left in 2012 to become an independent and play schools closer to its size, as the school was twice the size of most of the schools in the conference. South Central left the Midland Trail Conference to join the NTC and replace Teutopolis for the 2012-13 school year. North Clay left the Midland Trail Conference to join the NTC for the 2016-2017 school year making them the 3rd school to leave the MTC for the NTC in 7 years.

== Competitive Success ==
National Trail Conference schools have won 25 state championships in IHSA sponsored team sports, most recently the 2024 Class 2A baseball championship won by St. Anthony. Notably, Altamont was also a baseball state tournament qualifier that year in Class 1A with a runner-up finish.

St. Anthony, along with baseball championships in 2024 and 2012, won a Class 1A boys basketball title in 2017 and has been a dominant force in boys golf since the turn of the century with team championships in 2001, 2002, 2009, 2018, 2022, 2023 and 2024. Its girls golf program also won back-to-back championships in 2007 and 2008, while the school's volleyball and softball teams have also boasted state tournament appearances since 2021.

While founding member Teutopolis was still an NTC representative the school won a boys basketball state championship in 1986, the same year its girls basketball program won the first of five state championships. It also claimed top honors in 1988, 1989, 1990 and 1995. Teutopolis baseball was a Class 2A champion in 2010 and 2011, the school's final year in the league.

Stewardson-Strasburg won a Class 1A softball state championship in 2018, while Altamont was the Class 1A softball champ in 2014. Stew-Stras also won a Class A volleyball title in 1986 with runner-up finishes in 1984, 1985, 2013 and 2017 and other state tournament appearances in 1978, 1979, 1993, 1994, 1995 and 2016.

South Central and North Clay brought the league back-to-back Class 1A baseball championships in 2021 and 2022.

While no Neoga team sport has a state championship to its credit, it sent a girls basketball team to the state tournament in 2022 and a volleyball team in 2000. Altamont's girls basketball qualified for state tournament play in 2024 and 1981. St. Elmo boys basketball made a state tournament run in 1988, while Stew-Stras boys basketball did the same in 1995. Stew-Stras baseball made it to state in 1996.

NTC teams have also won countless regional and sectional titles.

== Cooperative Arrangements ==
In academic years 2021-22

- Cowden-Herrick and Beecher City
- Brownstown and St. Elmo
- Windsor and Stewardson-Strasburg
