= Gone Baby Gone (disambiguation) =

Gone Baby Gone is a 2007 American film directed by and starring Ben Affleck. The phrase may also refer to:

- Gone Baby Gone, the 1998 Dennis Lehane novel on which the film is based
- "Gone Baby Gone", an episode of the 19th season of Law & Order: Special Victims Unit
- "Gone Baby Gone", an episode of the seventh season of CSI: Miami
- "Gone Baby Gone", a song by Reks on his 2016 album The Greatest X
