= Gruen Von Behrens =

American anti-tobacco activist (1977–2015)

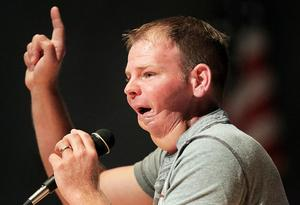
- Von Behrens speaks to students in the Westridge Middle School in Nebraska
- Born: May 14, 1977; Mattoon, Illinois, U.S.
- Died: September 8, 2015 (aged 38); Stewardson, Illinois, U.S.
- Cause of death: Oral cancer
- Education: Stewardson-Strasburg High School; Lake Land College
- Known for: Speaking about the dangers of smokeless tobacco across the United States and Canada
- Spouse: Sara Pruemer (m. 2008)

Gruen Von Behrens (May 14, 1977 – September 8, 2015) was an American speaker and victim of oral cancer caused by smokeless tobacco. After his diagnosis and multiple treatments, he became nationally known for raising awareness against the dangers of smokeless tobacco use.

== Early life and education ==
Von Behrens was born on May 14, 1977, in Mattoon, Illinois, to Tina Von Behrens. He grew up in the small town of Stewardson, Illinois. He graduated from Stewardson-Strasburg High School in the class of 1995 and later attended Lake Land College in Mattoon. In his youth, Von Behrens played baseball and wanted to eventually play at the college level. As a teenager, Von Behrens hit for the Stewardson-Strasburg High School Comets and wanted to play for the Chicago Cubs. He referred to Ryne Sandberg as his hero. He started chewing tobacco at the age of 13 and by the age of 17, he was diagnosed with mouth cancer. His battle with cancer forced him to give up his dream of becoming a Major League Baseball player.

== Personal life ==
Von Behrens’ cancer went into remission when he was 23. He married Sara Pruemer on April 26, 2008. They welcomed two daughters and continued living in Stewardson until his death.

== Public life ==
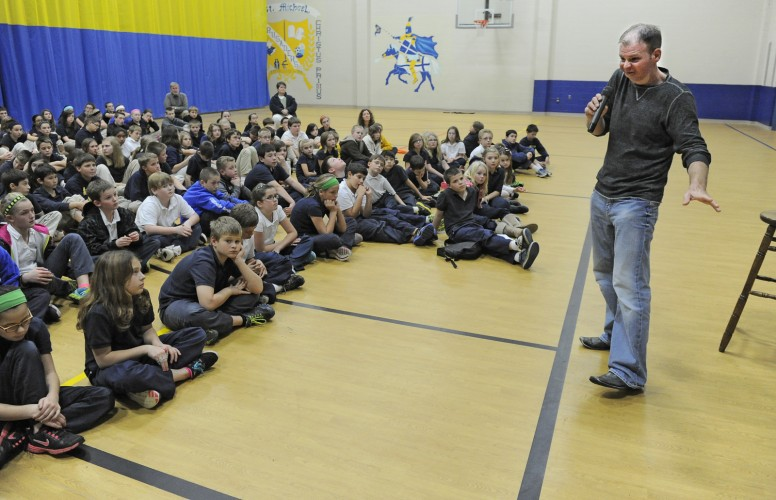
Von Behrens speaking to students at St. Michaels Catholic School in Indiana

Von Behrens was a motivational speaker who devoted part of his life to raising awareness regarding the dangers of tobacco use. He traveled across the United States and Canada working as a national spokesman for Oral Health America's National Spit Tobacco Education Program and participated in tobacco awareness campaigns, such as the Campaign for Tobacco-Free Kids and The Truth Campaign. As part of his efforts, he spoke to junior high and high school students in all 50 states and 10 provinces. In 2010, he testified before a United States Senate committee hearing about the dangers of tobacco in professional sports. In 2012, Von Behrens testified at a Maryland legislative hearing, urging lawmakers to increase the tax rate on cigars and smokeless tobacco to 70%, the same rate on cigarettes.

== Health and death ==
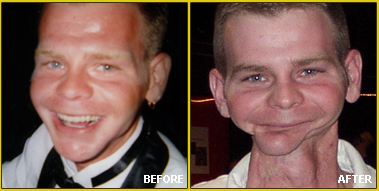
Before and after photo of Von Behrens

Von Behrens started dipping at 13 and was diagnosed with mouth cancer at 17. Von Behrens said the cancer began as a white spot, the size of a pinpoint, on the side of his tongue. He said he did not give it a second thought because white spots are not uncommon among tobacco users, but it did not go away. In one of his interviews, he said that his tongue split in half because the cancer was inside the tongue and then split it.

He subsequently endured more than 40 operations on his face, neck, and mouth, radiation treatments and chemotherapy. Doctors removed half of his tongue muscles and his jaw. They also took out half of his neck muscles. Doctors took sections of healthy skin from his legs and grafted them to his face and neck. Because of the radiation treatments, all of his teeth were removed, and at age 19, he had to start using dentures. His lower jaw was replaced with fibula bone from his lower leg. He was left severely disfigured by the surgeries. After a long battle with mouth cancer, Von Behrens died on September 8, 2015 in his home in Stewardson at the age of 38.
