= Enon, North Carolina =

Enon
- Unincorporated community
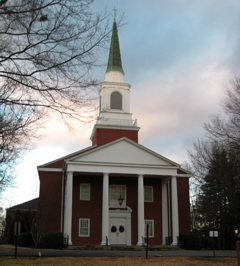
- Enon Baptist Church as it looks today

- Location within the state of North Carolina
- Coordinates: 36°08′24″N 80°28′08″W
- Country: United States
- State: North Carolina
- County: Yadkin
- Elevation: 886 ft (270 m)
- Time zone: UTC-5 (Eastern (EST))
  - Summer (DST): UTC-4 (EDT)
- GNIS feature ID: 984806

Enon is an unincorporated community in eastern Yadkin County, North Carolina, United States. The community, which is centered on Enon Baptist Church, is in the Forbush Township and in the East Bend ZIP code zone (27018). It is a Piedmont Triad community.

The community is bordered by the Yadkin River and Forsyth County to the east, Huntsville and Forbush and Logan creeks to the south, Flint Hill to the north and Looney Creek to the west.

== History ==
=== Pre-history ===
Native Americans were living along the Yadkin River at Enon going back to at least the early Woodland period (500 B.C.-100 A.D.), according to a 1998 archeological survey. A v-shaped stone fish weir, built and used by Native Americans to trap spawning fish, was identified north of the Old U.S. 421 Bridge in Enon.

=== Founding of community ===
The fertile river bottoms began to draw a few European settlers who followed the Great Wagon Road in the mid-18th century. By 1850, the area included large plantations along the Yadkin River, which were dependent on slave labor, as well as a few smaller farms.

The area was first known as Red Plains, likely for the red soil in the area. A school and post office were located there. Because there was no road nearby, only paths through the woods led to the school. A post office called Mana was at one time located in the area.

Enon Baptist Church was founded in 1858. Members first met at the Red Plains School, near the home of Tyre Glen. The name Enon was chosen because of its proximity of the Yadkin River. Enon is an alternate spelling for Ænon, a Greek word for spring. The church began with eight members, including John, a slave of Tyre Glen. The first church building included a balcony for slave members.

=== Civil War period ===
Tyre Glen or Tyree Glenn (1800–1875) built one of the largest plantations in western North Carolina, in Enon. The estate, known as Glenwood, once had 360 slaves and 6,000 acres (24 km^{2}). The 15-room house, with its Doric columns, was completed in 1837. The soapstone foundation for the house came from Glen's own quarry. Recently, it was restored and is a privately owned residence. Glen's property included a dam, gristmill and a ferry at the Yadkin River.

Glen spent his early career as a slave trader and land broker, helping set up plantations in Mississippi. Glen's papers are available through Duke University Libraries and have been cited in recent books on the Civil War period. Among the records, is a price table from the early 1850s that values slaves based on their ages. Glenwood was a center for culture in the area. Prominent visitors included Nathan Rudolphus., the son of Sen. Stephen A. Douglas; North Carolina Gov. Zebulon Vance; and North Carolina Chief Justice Richard M. Pearson.

In 1863, a company of 50 uninvited Confederate troops of the 8th Battalion Georgia Infantry descended on Glenwood. In April 1863, Glen's rants against secession angered the officers, who instigated a plot to lure him from Glenwood and hang him as a traitor. The officers' plot was stopped by heavy rains that washed away the bridge at Deep Creek, and Glen returned to his home.

In July 1864, William Alexander Conrad, a founding member of Enon Baptist Church and member of the Home Guard, was shot at Glenn's Ferry, trying to catch what he thought were three deserters who were crossing the river in a small boat. Conrad died several months later. Years after the war, it was learned that the men were Union soldiers who had escaped from prison and were on their way to Ohio.

Glenwood was raided several times during the close of the Civil War. After the last raid, in April 1865, most of the slaves had fled, and there was neither a horse nor a head of cattle left. As the Confederate army disbanded, troops marched along the ferry road that ran through the estate. For weeks, long tables were erected at each side of the house and family members and the few remaining freedmen gave food to all who stopped.

A partner in the slave trade with Glen, Isaac Jarratt (1812–1875), also settled in the Enon area. Jarratt, who served as a drummer boy during the War of 1812, bought the Davis Durrett plantation in 1835. Many of the Jarratt family papers, including letters and slave receipts, are located in the library at the University of North Carolina at Chapel Hill. During the Civil War, Isaac Jarratt was captain of the Yadkin County Home Guard.

The Jarratt family is also tied to the families of Thomas Lanier Clingman and through marriage to Richard Clauselle Puryear of nearby Huntsville. The Durrett-Jarratt House, on Old U.S. Highway 421, is listed on the National Register of Historic Places.

=== Later development ===
The community remained isolated after the Civil War. In 1913, the first bridge across the Yadkin River at Enon was authorized by the North Carolina Legislature. The steel bridge was completed a short time before a sand-clay road was built in 1915. The road, which linked Winston-Salem to Yadkinville, was paved in 1925 and became part of U.S. Highway 421. The highway gave the area easier access to Winston-Salem, which is less than 10 miles (16 km) east.

At least four country stores and a roller mill opened along the highway, offering gas and other conveniences to locals and travelers along the highway. However, the stores began closing in the 1960s after a new four-lane U.S. 421 was built a few miles south of the community. The former U.S. highway is now called Old U.S. 421.

In 1936, High Point began an ill-fated plan to build an 85-foot (26 m) deep lake and hydroelectric dam in an area that included portions the community. High Point bought up more than 14,000 acres (57 km^{2}) along the Yadkin River for the Styers Ferry dam project and had spent about $1 million before it was stopped by the courts. Local farmers and Duke Power mobilized to fight the plan. The dam project went before the state Supreme Court seven times. Finally, the federal government ended the project during World War II because generators were needed for the war effort.

== Growth and development ==
Until recently, many Enon residents lived on family farms, and the area remained primarily rural. However, the community's proximity to Winston-Salem has made it more attractive as a bedroom community. Development in the western suburbs of Winston-Salem, especially in nearby Lewisville, has begun to move into the community. Land that for decades had been used for farming is being converted into housing developments.

Most residents work in nearby Winston-Salem. However, there are a few home-grown businesses that employ area residents. The largest is Johnson's Modern Electric, which has a home office near the Yadkin River on Old U.S. Highway 421.

== Education ==
Most children in the area attend Forbush Elementary School, a kindergarten through eighth-grade community school at Bloomtown Road and Old U.S. 421. The school, which first opened in 1935, is a source of pride in the community. The school's hunter's safety team has won the National Junior Youth Hunter Education Challenge, a National Rifle Association sponsored event, six times: 1989, 1990, 2005, 2006, 2007, 2008 and 2009. The 2007 team compiled a score of 7,580, 792 points over the second-place team from Utah, and took honors in all events.

Forbush Elementary, one of five feeder schools for Forbush High School, was rebuilt after a 1986 countywide bond referendum. In 2002, a tower was built in front of the school to house the old bell that was used at Enon School, a three-teacher school built in 1908. The bell was moved to the school when Enon School closed.

== Recreation ==
Old U.S. 421 River Park is located just across the Yadkin River from Enon. The 1.58-acre (6,400 m^{2}) park allows convenient access to the Yadkin River for fishing or canoeing. It is part of the Forsyth County park system.
