= Glenwood (Enon, North Carolina) =

Historic house in North Carolina, United States

- U.S. National Register of Historic Places
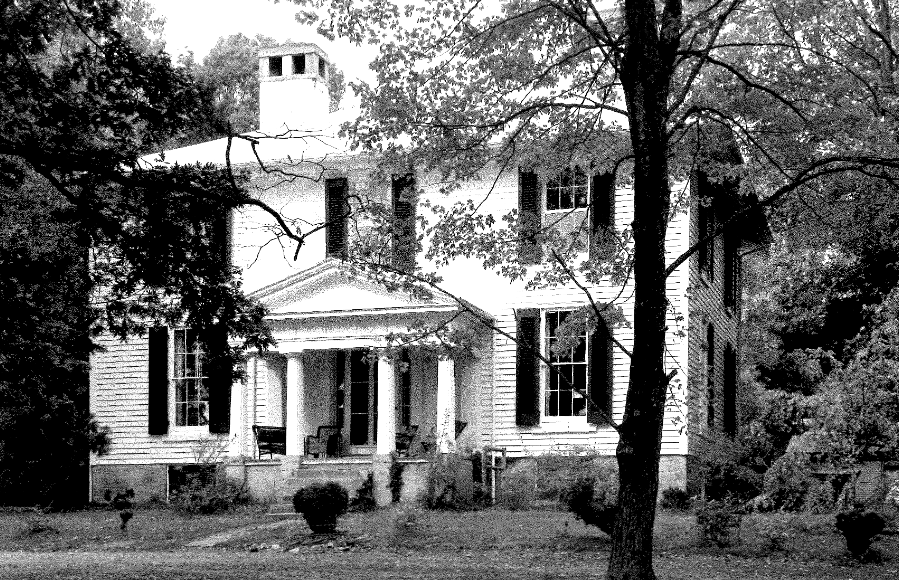

- Location within North Carolina Location within the United States
- Location: E of Enon on SR 1549, near Enon, North Carolina
- Coordinates: 36°9′9″N 80°28′2″W
- Area: 39.9 acres (16.1 ha)
- Built: 1837
- Architect: Tyre Glen, Martha Bynum Glen
- Architectural style: Greek Revival
- NRHP reference No.: 79001766
- Added to NRHP: August 13, 1979

Glenwood is a historic plantation with a Greek Revival house and several outbuildings, located near Enon, Yadkin County, North Carolina.

Tyre Glen or Tyree Glenn (1800–1875) built one of the largest plantations in western North Carolina in Enon. The estate, known as Glenwood, once had 360 slaves and 6,000 acres (24 km^{2}). The 15-room house, with its Doric columns, was completed in 1837. The soapstone foundation for the house came from Glen's own quarry. The house was restored in the second half of the twentieth century, and is a privately owned residence. Glen's original property included a dam, gristmill and a ferry at the Yadkin River.

Glen spent his early career as a slave trader and land broker, helping set up plantations in Mississippi. Glen's papers are available at the Rubenstein Library, Duke University and have been cited in recent books on the Civil War period. Among the records, is a price table from the early 1850s that values slaves based on their ages. Glenwood was a center for culture in the area. Prominent visitors included North Carolina Gov. Zebulon Vance; and North Carolina Chief Justice Richard M. Pearson. Glen was married to Margaret Ann Bynum (June 8, 1816 - July 3, 1871) daughter of Hampton Bynum and Mary Coleman Martin.

In 1863, a company of 50 uninvited Confederate troops of the 8th Battalion Georgia Infantry descended on Glenwood. In April 1863, Glen's rants against Secession angered the officers, who instigated a plot to lure him from Glenwood and hang him as a traitor. The officers' plot was stopped by heavy rains that washed away the bridge at Deep Creek, and Glen returned to his home.

In July 1864, William Alexander Conrad, a founding member of Enon Baptist Church and member of the Home Guard, was shot at Glenn's Ferry trying to catch what he thought were three deserters who were crossing the river in a small boat. Conrad died several months later. Years after the war, it was learned that the men were Union soldiers who had escaped from prison and were on their way to Ohio.

Glenwood was raided several times during the American Civil War. By the last raid in April 1865, most of the slaves had fled, and there was neither a horse nor a head of cattle left. As the Confederate army disbanded, troops marched along the ferry road that ran through the estate. For weeks, long tables were erected at each side of the house and family members and the few remaining freedmen gave food to all who stopped.

Isaac Jarratt (1812–1875), one of Glen's partners in the slave trade, also settled in the Enon area. Jarratt, who served as a drummer boy during the War of 1812, bought the Davis Durrett plantation in 1835. Many of the Jarratt family papers, including letters and slave receipts, are located in the library at the University of North Carolina at Chapel Hill. During the Civil War, Isaac Jarratt was captain of the Yadkin County Home Guard.

The Jarratt family is also tied to the families of Thomas Lanier Clingman and through marriage to Richard Clauselle Puryear of nearby Huntsville, North Carolina. The Durrett-Jarratt House, on Old U.S. Highway 421, is listed on the National Register of Historic Places.
