= Amy Ryan =

American actress (born 1968)

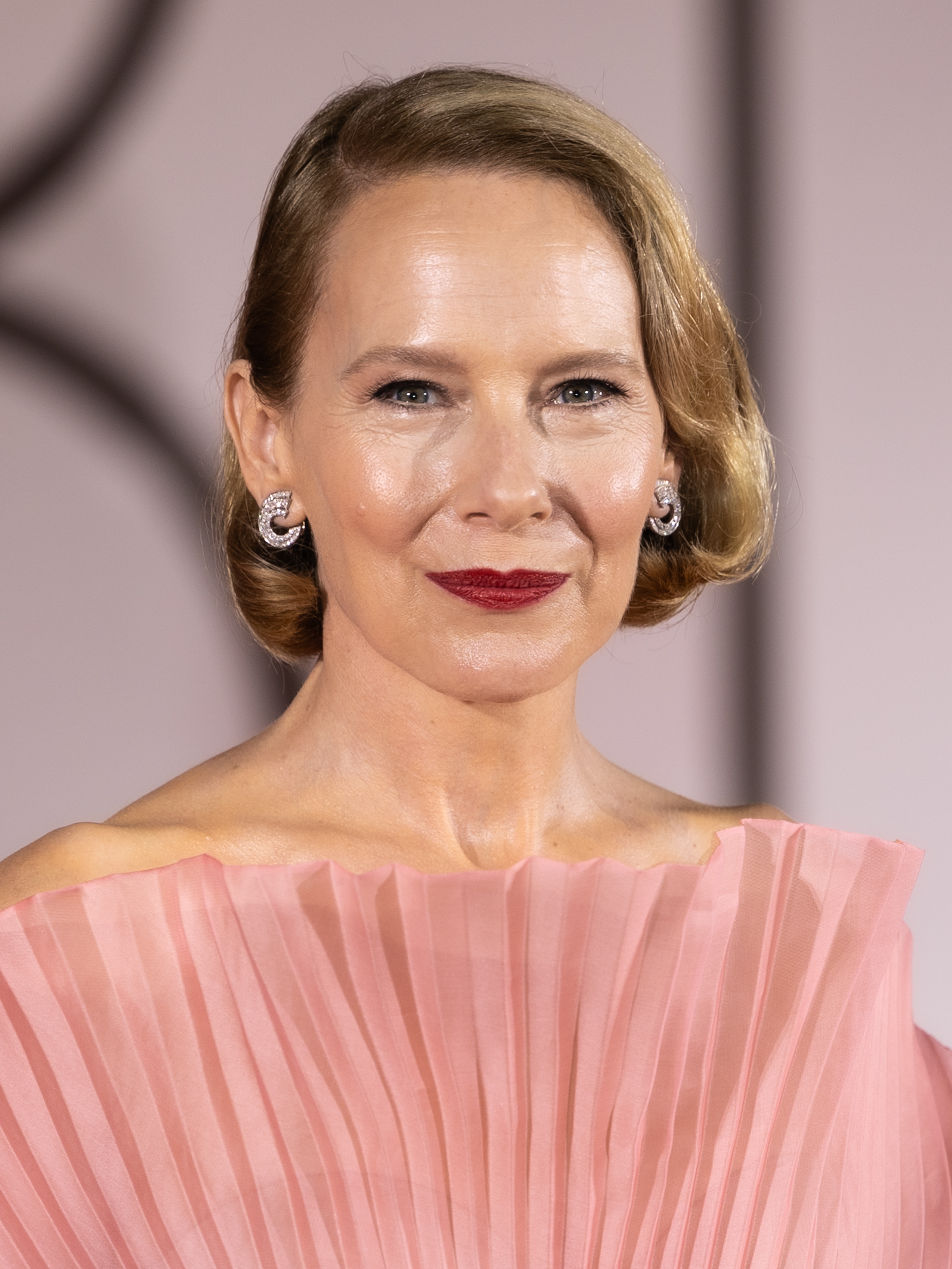
- Ryan at the premiere of Wolfs in 2024
- Born: Amy Beth Dziewiontkowski; May 3, 1968 (age 58); New York City, U.S.
- Occupation: Actress
- Years active: 1987–present
- Spouse: Eric Slovin (m. 2011)
- Children: 1
- Awards: Full list

Amy Beth Dziewiontkowski (born May 3, 1968), known professionally as Amy Ryan, is an American actress. She began her professional stage career in 1987 and made her Broadway debut in 1993 as a replacement in the original production of Wendy Wasserstein's The Sisters Rosensweig. She was nominated for the Tony Award for Best Featured Actress in a Play for her performances in Uncle Vanya (2000) and A Streetcar Named Desire (2005), and the Tony Award for Best Actress in a Play for Doubt: A Parable (2024).

For her breakthrough film role as a troubled single mother in the thriller Gone Baby Gone (2007), Ryan was nominated for the Academy Award for Best Supporting Actress. Her other films include You Can Count on Me (2000), Capote (2005), Before the Devil Knows You're Dead (2007), Changeling (2008), Birdman (2014), Bridge of Spies (2015), The Infiltrator (2016), Beautiful Boy (2018), and Beau Is Afraid (2023).

On television, she played Beadie Russell in the HBO crime series The Wire (2002–2008) and Holly Flax in the NBC sitcom The Office (2008–2011), and has also featured in the HBO drama series In Treatment (2010), the Hulu mystery comedy series Only Murders in the Building (2021–2024), and the Apple TV+ neo-noir mystery series Sugar (2024).

== Early life ==
Ryan was born Amy Beth Dziewiontkowski in Flushing, Queens, in New York City, the daughter of Pamela (née Ryan), a nurse, and John Dziewiontkowski, a trucking business owner. She is of Polish, Irish, and English descent. Growing up in the 1970s, Ryan and her sister Laura delivered the Daily News by bike. At a young age, Ryan attended the Stagedoor Manor Performing Arts Center in upstate New York. At 17, she graduated from New York's High School of Performing Arts. Hired for the national tour of Biloxi Blues right out of high school, Ryan worked steadily off-Broadway for the next decade. She chose her mother's maiden name as her stage name.

== Career ==
=== 1987–2005: Broadway debut and early roles ===
Ryan made her off-Broadway debut in the Westside Theatre's 1987 production of A Shayna Maidel, playing the role of Hanna. The following year she was seen in the Second Stage Theatre Company's revival of The Rimers of Eldritch. Additional off-Broadway credits include As Bees In Honey Drown, Crimes of the Heart and Saved. She also worked in regional theater, where she originated roles in new plays by Neil LaBute, Arthur Miller and Neil Simon. On Broadway she has appeared as Tess in The Sisters Rosensweig, Natasha in the 1997 revival of The Three Sisters, and Peggy in the 2001–2002 revival of The Women.

Following a brief stint playing a runaway on As the World Turns, Ryan was cast in television series such as I'll Fly Away, After roles on ER and Chicago Hope, Ryan became a series regular on The Naked Truth as Téa Leoni's spoiled stepdaughter. In 1993, she made her first appearance on NBC's Law & Order, appearing in several episodes over the years.

Ryan was nominated for the Tony Award for Best Performance by a Featured Actress in a Play twice: in 2000, for her portrayal of Sonya Alexandrovna in Uncle Vanya, and in 2005, for her performance as Stella Kowalski opposite John C. Reilly in A Streetcar Named Desire.

Because of the deletion of the scene where she played Eric Stoltz's wife in Allison Anders's Grace of My Heart, Ryan made her 1999 film debut in Roberta. She then briefly appeared in You Can Count on Me, which starred Laura Linney and Mark Ruffalo, and the mystery/thriller Keane. By 2001, director Sidney Lumet cast her in 100 Centre Street playing three different roles (Ellen, Paris and Rebecca). From 2003 to 2008 Ryan went on to feature prominently in HBO's crime drama series The Wire, playing Port Authority Officer Beadie Russell. Albert Brooks chose her to play his wife in Looking for Comedy in the Muslim World in 2005, and 2007 brought both Dan in Real Life and Before the Devil Knows You're Dead. Her role as a star-struck sheriff's wife in Capote earned her positive reviews, but it was playing a hardened welfare mom in Ben Affleck's Gone Baby Gone that finally brought her national attention.

=== 2006–2017: Breakthrough and acclaim ===
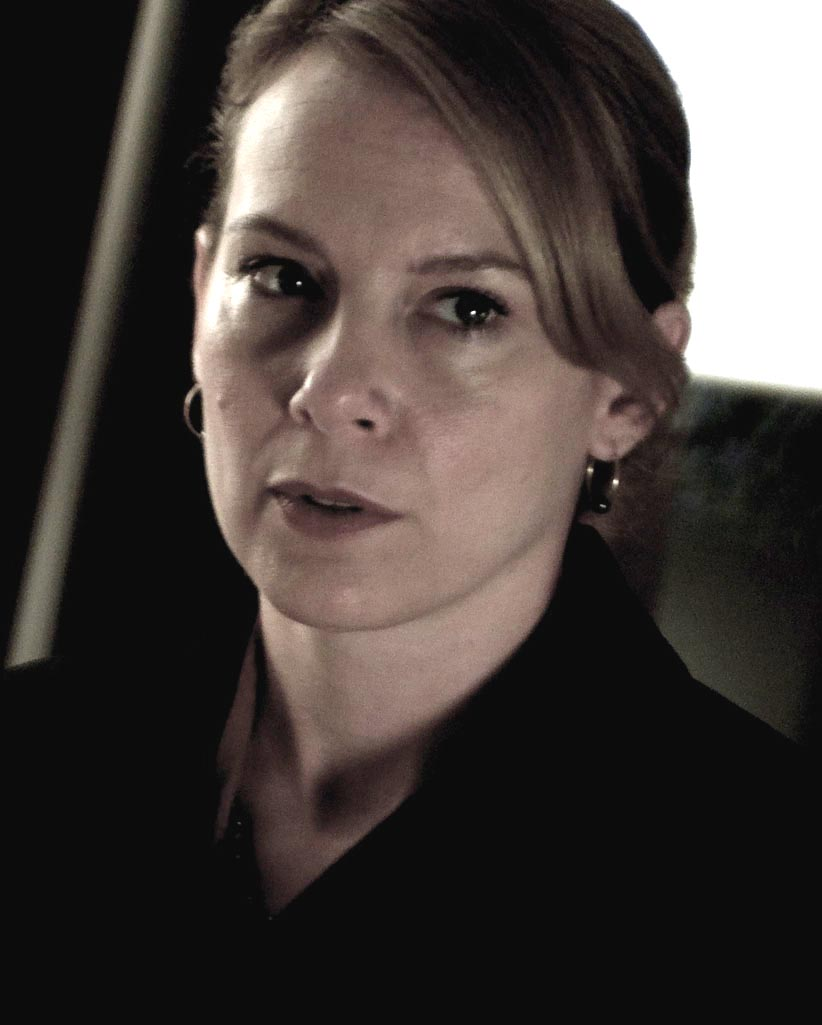
Ryan in 2007

After being voted Best Supporting Actress for Gone Baby Gone by the National Board of Review, as well as the critics circles in New York, Los Angeles, Boston, San Francisco and Washington, D.C., Ryan's performance was also nominated for a Golden Globe Award, a Screen Actors Guild Award, and an Oscar for Best Performance by an Actress in a Supporting role at the 80th Academy Awards.

Ryan appeared in Changeling (2008), directed by Clint Eastwood, and opposite Matt Damon in Paul Greengrass's Green Zone (2010). In September 2010, she completed filming a role in Philip Seymour Hoffman's directorial film debut, Jack Goes Boating, taking over the role of Connie originally played by Beth Cole in the stage version. Ryan received strong notices for her performance in Tom McCarthy's Win Win the next year, winning Best Supporting Actress awards from multiple regional critics groups. She appeared in a six-episode arc on The Office as dorky HR rep Holly Flax. She reprised her role on The Office in seasons 5 and 7. Ryan joined the cast of HBO's In Treatment for its third season in 2010, playing the therapist of Dr. Paul Weston.

Ryan was a part of the core ensemble of the 2014 Best Picture Academy Award winning film Birdman, sharing in the cast's Screen Actors Guild Award for Outstanding Performance by a Cast in a Motion Picture victory. In 2015, she starred as Mary Donovan opposite Tom Hanks in the film Bridge of Spies, and reunited with her In Treatment co-star Gabriel Byrne in Louder Than Bombs, the English-language debut of Joachim Trier. Early the next year, Ryan was cast as Tracy, her first on-screen leading role, in Abundant Acreage Available, a rural family drama from Junebug screenwriter Angus MacLachlan. Upon the film's premiere at the 2017 Tribeca Film Festival, Ryan drew universal acclaim for her performance, with The Wrap noting that she "holds the screen no matter what she's doing and who she's with" and Flavorwire raving that Ryan "sounds notes that are quietly dazzling in their complexity." Variety chief film critic Peter Debruge dubbed the performance a career highlight:

It's a pleasure to see such a fine actress navigate the nuances of her role ... Only on the big screen are we able to fully appreciate the minutely detailed nature of Ryan's performance, revealing Tracy's soul via the slightest narrowing of the eyes or the almost-subliminal tensing of her cheekbones. As we know, Junebug earned Amy Adams an Oscar nomination, and if the world were fair, this role would bring another Amy similar attention.

Ryan received some of the best reviews of her career for her leading role in the Roundabout Theater Company's 2016 production of Love, Love, Love. Ben Brantley of The New York Times praised her "smashing comic performance," The Hollywood Reporter called her work "emotionally vital," and The Associated Press raved that "Ryan is absolutely magnetic ... nailing her charming, unpredictable character with perfect comedic timing." In an article exploring various famous actresses working on the stage, The Washington Post theater critic Peter Marks highlighted Ryan's work in the play:

The revelation is not that Amy Ryan is good. It's that she's this good ... Ryan, whose range has been apparent for years, in dramatic performances nominated for Tonys (Uncle Vanya) and Oscars (Gone Baby Gone), as well as in nuanced comic turns on television shows like The Office, manages a feat in Love, Love, Love that she's never accomplished so fluidly before: taking charge. She delivers a front-and-center performance of such beguiling dynamism (in a thoroughly convincing English accent) that you feel this Roundabout Theatre Company production has done for her precisely what was intended. It exposes a new facet of her talent — and leaves us with that uplifting itch, to be there the next time she's on a stage.

For her performance in Love, Love, Love, Ryan won the Obie Award for Distinguished Performance by an Actress, and was nominated for the Drama Desk Award for Outstanding Actress in a Play and the Drama League Award for Distinguished Performance.

=== 2018–present ===
Ryan at the 2026 New York Film Festival

In 2018, Ryan co-starred in Beautiful Boy for Amazon Studios, a dark family drama, with her The Office co-star Steve Carell, and Timothée Chalamet. She was then among the ensemble cast of 2019's Late Night, the Mindy Kaling-penned comedy about a female late-night talk show host (Emma Thompson); and Strange but True, a noir-thriller based on the novel by John Searles. In 2020, Ryan starred as Mari Gilbert, a real life woman searching for her missing daughter, in Netflix's mystery thriller Lost Girls.

In 2021, Amy Ryan played Jan Bellows, a main role, in the first season of Hulu series Only Murders in the Building co-starring with Steve Martin, Martin Short and Selena Gomez. In 2023 she appeared in Ari Aster's A24 black comedy psychological horror film Beau Is Afraid starring Joaquin Phoenix. In the film she played Grace, who, alongside Nathan Lane's Roger, takes Beau in for a brief period of time.

== Personal life ==
Ryan married Eric Slovin in 2011. They have one daughter born in October 2009.

== Acting credits ==
=== Film ===
Year	Title	Role	Notes
1999	Roberta	Judy	
2000	You Can Count on Me	Rachel Louise Prescott	
2000	A Pork Chop for Larry	Beth	Short film
2004	Keane	Lynn Bedik	
2005	War of the Worlds	Neighbor with Toddler	
2005	Capote	Marie Dewey	
2005	Looking for Comedy in the Muslim World	Emily Brooks	
2006	Marvelous	Queenie	
2007	Gone Baby Gone	Helene McCready	
2007	Neal Cassady	Carolyn Cassady	
2007	Before the Devil Knows You're Dead	Martha Hanson	
2007	Dan in Real Life	Eileen Burns	
2008	Changeling	Carol Dexter	
2009	The Missing Person	Miss Charley	Also executive producer
2009	Bob Funk	Ms. Wright	
2010	Jack Goes Boating	Connie	
2010	Green Zone	Lawrie Dayne	
2011	Win Win	Jackie Flaherty	
2013	Breathe In	Megan Reynolds	
2013	Escape Plan	Abigail Ross	
2013	Devil's Knot	Margaret Lax	
2014	Birdman or (The Unexpected Virtue of Ignorance)	Sylvia	
2015	Don Verdean	Carol	
2015	Louder Than Bombs	Hannah	
2015	Goosebumps	Gale Cooper	
2015	Bridge of Spies	Mary McKenna Donovan	
2016	Central Intelligence	Agent Pamela Harris	
2016	The Infiltrator	Bonni Tischler	
2016	Monster Trucks	Cindy Coley	
2017	Abundant Acreage Available	Tracy Ledbetter	
2018	Beautiful Boy	Vicki Sheff	
2019	Late Night	Caroline Morton	
2019	Strange but True	Charlene Chase	
2020	Worth	Camille Biros	
2020	Lost Girls	Mari Gilbert	
2023	Beau Is Afraid	Grace	
2024	Wolfs	Margaret / Pam	
2026	A Statement	Annemarie Crocetti	Completed

=== Television ===
Year	Title	Role	Notes
1990	As the World Turns	Renee	Unknown episodes
1991	Quantum Leap	Libby McBain	Episode: "Raped - June 20, 1980"
1991	Brooklyn Bridge	Young Sophie	Episode: "Old Fools"
1992	Home Improvement	Robin	Episode: "Luck Be a Taylor Tonight"
1992	I'll Fly Away	Parkie Sasser	6 episodes
1993; 2006	Law & Order	Amy / Valerie Messick	2 episodes
1995	Sirens	April Ward	Episode: "The Abduction"
1995	ER	Sister Elizabeth	Episode: "Love Among the Ruins"
1995–1996	The Naked Truth	Chloe Banks	20 episodes
1998	Chicago Hope	Helen Sherwood	Episode: "Liver, Hold the Mushrooms"
1998	A Will of Their Own	Carrie Baker	Miniseries
1999	Homicide: Life on the Street	Erika Cullen	Episode: "A Case of Do or Die"
2000	Law & Order: Special Victims Unit	Lorraine Hansen	Episode: "Bad Blood"
2001–2002	100 Centre Street	Rebecca Rifkind / Ellen	7 episodes
2003; 2007	Law & Order: Criminal Intent	Julie Turner / Edie Nelson	2 episodes
2003–2008	The Wire	Beadie Russell	20 episodes
2004	Third Watch	Dr. Jenny Hanson	Episode: "Last Will and Testament"
2006	American Experience	Luzena Wilson	Episode: "The Gold Rush"
2006–2007	Kidnapped	Maureen Campbell	2 episodes
2008	Independent Lens	Anita Hoffman	Episode: "Chicago 10"
2008–2011	The Office	Holly Flax	17 episodes
2010	In Treatment	Adele	8 episodes
2013	Clear History	Wendy the Waitress	Television film
2015–2017	Broad City	Heidi Strand	2 episodes
2016–2019	High Maintenance	Gigi	2 episodes
2018	Robot Chicken	Lobster Lady / Psylocke / Liesl von Trapp	Voice; Episode: "Shall I Visit the Dinosaurs?"
2020	I'll Be Gone in the Dark	Michelle McNamara's Writings Read By	Voice; 6 episodes
2021–2022; 2024	Only Murders in the Building	Jan Bellows	11 episodes
2024	Sugar	Melanie Matthews	8 episodes
2026	Rick and Morty	Marjorie	Voice; Episode: "Rick Days, Seven Nights"

=== Audio ===
Year	Title	Role	Notes
2019	The Horror of Dolores Roach	Georgie	Fiction podcast series Episode: "The Single Greatest Threat to Our Survival"

=== Theater ===
Year	Title	Role	Venue	Ref.
1988	The Rimers of Eldritch	Lena Truitt	Second Stage Theatre, Off-Broadway	
1992	Hot Dog Hitman	Doris / Mrs. Garcia	West Bank Theatre, Off-Broadway	
1993	The Sisters Rosensweig	Tess Goode (replacement)	Ethel Barrymore Theatre, Broadway	
1997	Three Sisters	Natalya Ivanovna (replacement)	Criterion Center Stage, Broadway	
2000	Uncle Vanya	Sonya Alexandrovna	Brooks Atkinson Theatre, Broadway	
2001	Crimes of the Heart	Meg Magrath	Second Stage Theatre, Off-Broadway	
2001	The Women	Peggy	American Airlines Theatre, Broadway	
2003	Dublin Carol	Mary	Atlantic Theatre Company, Off-Broadway	
2005	A Streetcar Named Desire	Stella Kowalski	Studio 54, Broadway	
2005	On the Mountain	Sarah	Playwrights Horizons, Off-Broadway	
2006	The 24 Hour Plays	Susan	American Airlines Theatre, Broadway	
2012	Detroit	Mary	Playwright Horizons, Off-Broadway	
2016	Love, Love, Love	Sandra	Roundabout Theatre Company, Off-Broadway	
2024	Doubt	Sister Aloysius Beauvier	Todd Haimes Theatre, Broadway	

== Awards and nominations ==
Year	Association	Category	Nominated work	Result	Ref.
2007	Academy Award	Best Supporting Actress	Gone Baby Gone	Nominated	
2007	Golden Globe Award	Best Supporting Actress – Motion Picture	Gone Baby Gone	Nominated	
2007	Actor Awards	Outstanding Performance by a Female Actor in a Supporting Role	Gone Baby Gone	Nominated	
2014	Actor Awards	Outstanding Performance by a Cast in a Motion Picture	Birdman	Won	
2021	Actor Awards	Outstanding Performance by an Ensemble in a Comedy Series	Only Murders in the Building	Nominated	
2000	Tony Awards	Best Featured Actress in a Play	Uncle Vanya	Nominated	
2005	Tony Awards	Best Featured Actress in a Play	A Streetcar Named Desire	Nominated	
2024	Tony Awards	Best Actress in a Play	Doubt: A Parable	Nominated	
