= List of awards and nominations received by Amy Ryan =

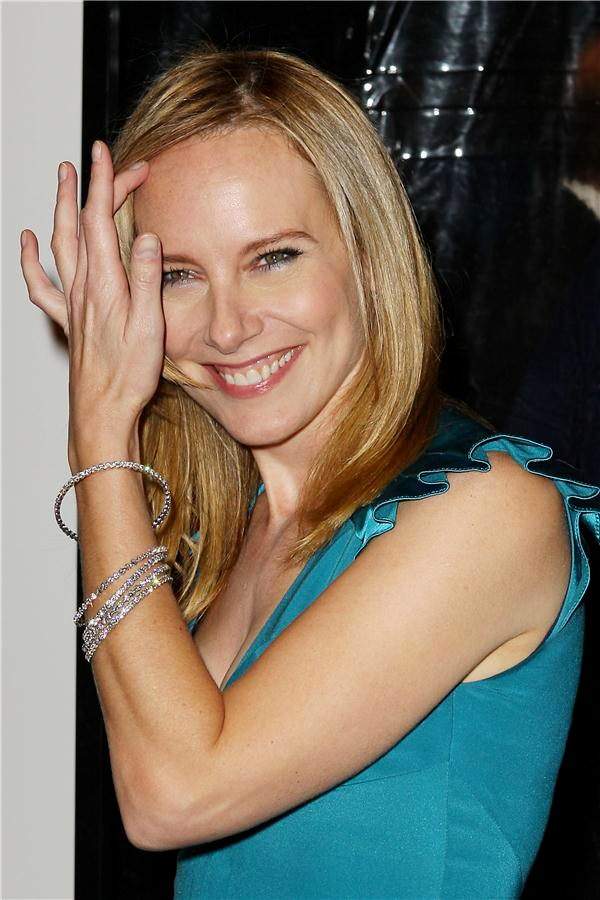
Amy Ryan in New York in 2013

This article is a List of awards and nominations received by Amy Ryan

Amy Ryan is an American actress known for her performance in film, television and theatre. She has received numerous accolades including a Screen Actors Guild Award, a Obie Award, and Outer Critics Circle Award. She has also received nominations for an Academy Award, a Golden Globe Award, a Drama Desk Award, a Drama League Award, and two Tony Awards.

Ryan started her career acting in theatre receiving two Tony Award nominations for Best Featured Actress in a Play for her roles as Sonya Alexandrovna in Uncle Vanya (2000), and Stella Kowalski in A Streetcar Named Desire (2005). She received nominations for a Academy Award for Best Supporting Actress, a Golden Globe Award for Best Supporting Actress – Motion Picture, and a Screen Actors Guild Award for Outstanding Performance by a Female Actor in a Supporting Role for her role as Helene McCready in the Ben Affleck directed drama Gone Baby Gone (2007).

== Major associations ==
=== Academy Award ===
Year	Category	Nominated work	Result	Ref.
2007	Best Supporting Actress	Gone Baby Gone	Nominated	

=== Golden Globe Award ===
Year	Category	Nominated work	Result	Ref.
2007	Best Supporting Actress – Motion Picture	Gone Baby Gone	Nominated	

=== Screen Actors Guild Awards ===
Year	Category	Nominated work	Result	Ref.
2007	Outstanding Actress in a Supporting Role	Gone Baby Gone	Nominated	
2014	Outstanding Cast in a Motion Picture	Birdman	Won	
2021	Outstanding Ensemble in a Comedy Series	Only Murders in the Building	Nominated	

=== Tony Awards ===
Year	Category	Nominated work	Result	Ref.
2000	Best Featured Actress in a Play	Uncle Vanya	Nominated	
2005	Best Featured Actress in a Play	A Streetcar Named Desire	Nominated	
2024	Best Leading Actress in a Play	Doubt: A Parable	Nominated	

== Theatre awards ==
=== Drama Desk Award ===
Year	Category	Nominated work	Result	Ref.
2017	Outstanding Actress in a Play	Love, Love, Love	Nominated	

=== Drama League Award ===
Year	Category	Nominated work	Result	Ref.
2001	Distinguished Performance	Saved	Nominated	
2017	Distinguished Performance	Love, Love, Love	Nominated	

=== Obie Award ===
Year	Category	Nominated work	Result	Ref.
2017	Distinguished Performance by an Actress	Love, Love, Love	Won	

=== Outer Critics Circle Award ===
Year	Category	Nominated work	Result	Ref.
2005	Outstanding Featured Actress in a Play	A Streetcar Named Desire	Won	

== Critics associations ==
Year	Award	Category	Nominated work	Result
2007	Alliance of Women Film Journalists Award	Best Supporting Actress	Gone Baby Gone	Won
2007	Alliance of Women Film Journalists Award	Best Breakthrough Performance	Gone Baby Gone	Nominated
2007	Boston Society of Film Critics Award	Best Supporting Actress	Gone Baby Gone	Won
2007	Chicago Film Critics Association Award	Best Supporting Actress	Gone Baby Gone	Nominated
2007	Critics' Choice Movie Award	Best Supporting Actress	Gone Baby Gone	Won
2007	Dallas-Fort Worth Film Critics Association Award	Best Supporting Actress	Gone Baby Gone	Nominated
2007	Detroit Film Critics Society Award	Best Supporting Actress	Gone Baby Gone	Nominated
2007	Florida Film Critics Circle Award	Best Supporting Actress	Gone Baby Gone	Won
2007	Houston Film Critics Society Award	Best Supporting Actress	Gone Baby Gone	Won
2007	Iowa Film Critics Award	Best Supporting Actress	Gone Baby Gone	Won
2007	Los Angeles Film Critics Association Award	Best Supporting Actress	Gone Baby Gone	Won
2007	National Board of Review Award	Best Supporting Actress	Gone Baby Gone	Won
2007	National Society of Film Critics Award	Best Supporting Actress	Gone Baby Gone	Nominated
2007	New York Film Critics Circle Award	Best Supporting Actress	Gone Baby Gone	Won
2007	Oklahoma Film Critics Circle Award	Best Supporting Actress	Gone Baby Gone	Won
2007	Online Film Critics Society Award	Best Supporting Actress	Gone Baby Gone	Won
2007	Phoenix Film Critics Society Award	Best Supporting Actress	Gone Baby Gone	Won
2007	San Diego Film Critics Society Award	Best Supporting Actress	Gone Baby Gone	Won
2007	San Francisco Film Critics Circle Award	Best Supporting Actress	Gone Baby Gone	Won
2007	Satellite Award	Best Supporting Actress - Motion Picture	Gone Baby Gone	Won
2007	Southeastern Film Critics Association Award	Best Supporting Actress	Gone Baby Gone	Won
2007	St. Louis Gateway Film Critics Association Award	Best Supporting Actress	Gone Baby Gone	Won
2007	Toronto Film Critics Association Award	Best Supporting Actress	Gone Baby Gone	Nominated
2007	Utah Film Critics Association Award	Best Supporting Actress	Gone Baby Gone	Won
2007	Vancouver Film Critics Circle Award	Best Supporting Actress	Gone Baby Gone	Nominated
2007	Washington D.C. Area Film Critics Association Award	Best Supporting Actress	Gone Baby Gone	Won
2007	Los Angeles Film Critics Association Award	Best Supporting Actress	Before the Devil Knows You're Dead	Won
2007	Washington D.C. Area Film Critics Association Award	Best Supporting Actress	Before the Devil Knows You're Dead	Won
2009	Golden Nymph Award	Outstanding Actress - Comedy Series	The Office	Nominated
2010	Comedy Film Award	Best Leading Actress	Jack Goes Boating	Nominated
2011	Utah Film Critics Association Award	Best Supporting Actress	Win Win	Won
2011	Indiana Film Critics Association Award	Best Supporting Actress	Win Win	Nominated
2014	Alliance of Women Film Journalists Award	Best Ensemble	Birdman or (The Unexpected Virtue of Ignorance)	Won
2014	Boston Society of Film Critics Award	Best Cast	Birdman or (The Unexpected Virtue of Ignorance)	Runner-up
2014	Boston Online Film Critics Association Awards	Best Ensemble	Birdman or (The Unexpected Virtue of Ignorance)	Won
2014	Critics' Choice Movie Award	Best Acting Ensemble	Birdman or (The Unexpected Virtue of Ignorance)	Won
2014	Central Ohio Film Critics Association Award	Best Ensemble	Birdman or (The Unexpected Virtue of Ignorance)	Nominated
2014	Detroit Film Critics Society Award	Best Ensemble	Birdman or (The Unexpected Virtue of Ignorance)	Won
2014	Florida Film Critics Circle Award for Best Cast	Best Cast	Birdman or (The Unexpected Virtue of Ignorance)	Nominated
2014	Georgia Film Critics Association Award	Best Ensemble	Birdman or (The Unexpected Virtue of Ignorance)	Nominated
2014	Las Vegas Film Critics Society Award	Best Ensemble	Birdman or (The Unexpected Virtue of Ignorance)	Won
2014	New York Film Critics Online Awards	Best Ensemble Cast	Birdman or (The Unexpected Virtue of Ignorance)	Won
2014	North Texas Film Critics Association Award	Best Ensemble Cast	Birdman or (The Unexpected Virtue of Ignorance)	Won
2014	Phoenix Film Critics Society Award	Best Ensemble Acting	Birdman or (The Unexpected Virtue of Ignorance)	Won
2014	San Diego Film Critics Society Awards	Best Film Ensemble	Birdman or (The Unexpected Virtue of Ignorance)	Won
2014	Southeastern Film Critics Association Award	Best Ensemble	Birdman or (The Unexpected Virtue of Ignorance)	Nominated
2014	Washington D.C. Area Film Critics Association Awards	Best Acting Ensemble	Birdman or (The Unexpected Virtue of Ignorance)	Won
