= Prayers for Rain =

1999 novel by Dennis Lehane

- First edition
- Author: Dennis Lehane
- Language: English
- Series: Kenzie-Gennaro
- Genre: Crime
- Publisher: William Morrow and Company
- Publication date: November 1999
- Publication place: United States
- Media type: Print (hardback & paperback)
- Pages: 352 pp
- ISBN: 0-688-15333-X
- Preceded by: Gone, Baby, Gone
- Followed by: Moonlight Mile

Prayers for Rain is a 1999 crime novel by American writer Dennis Lehane. It is the fifth novel in the author's Kenzie-Gennaro series, focusing on private investigators Patrick Kenzie and Angela Gennaro.

== Plot summary ==
After the events of the preceding novel, Gone, Baby, Gone, Patrick Kenzie is working solo; Angie Gennaro has left their partnership for employment at a large investigative firm, moving out of Dorchester and turning her back on a possible personal relationship with Kenzie.

A young woman has leapt to her death from Boston's landmark Custom House tower, and Kenzie is shocked to hear that she is one of his former clients, Karen Nichols. A dressed-for-success career woman, Nichols had hired him several months earlier to scare off a stalker she had first encountered at her fitness club. An unpleasant visit from Kenzie and his explosive friend Bubba Rogowski had apparently been enough to deter the stalker, Cody Falk, an upscale predator with a long history of restraining orders.

But news of Nichols' suicide leads Kenzie to recall, with some guilt, a loose end from her case. Several weeks after he'd confronted the stalker, Nichols had left a message on his answering machine—and he had neglected to return her call.

Stung by his former client's death, Kenzie makes a quick investigation and finds that at the time of her call, Nichols had been experiencing a suspicious run of bad luck. Her fiancé had been hit by a car and went into an irreversible coma from his injuries; she had lost her job while caring for him; and, according to the police, the pert young client Kenzie recalled as "someone who would iron her socks" had become a strung-out prostitute working from a cheap motel. When Kenzie once again questions Falk, he discovers that the stalker had received several notes, purporting to be from Karen Nichols herself, inviting him to continue pursuing her. Horrified and fascinated, Kenzie embarks on the search for a vindictive mastermind who manipulated Falk and others in a complex scheme to destroy Nichols' life.
