= Abundant Acreage Available =

- Film poster
- Directed by: Angus MacLachlan
- Written by: Angus MacLachlan
- Produced by: Kate Churchill; Angus MacLachlan
- Starring: Amy Ryan; Terry Kinney; Max Gail; Francis Guinan; Steve Coulter
- Cinematography: Andrew Reed
- Edited by: Michael R. Miller
- Music by: Jeffrey Dean Foster
- Distributed by: Gravitas Ventures
- Release date: April 20, 2017 (Tribeca Film Festival)
- Running time: 80 minutes
- Country: United States
- Language: English

Abundant Acreage Available is a 2017 drama film written and directed by Angus MacLachlan. Amy Ryan and Terry Kinney star as siblings dealing with their father's recent death when three brothers, whose family operated a multi-generational family farm in rural North Carolina, return to bury their own father. Martin Scorsese is one of the executive producers.

Filming took place on location at a 50-acre tobacco farm near the town of East Bend, North Carolina in Yadkin County during a 17-day period in February 2016.

== Cast ==
- Amy Ryan as Tracy Ledbetter
- Terry Kinney as Jesse Ledbetter
- Max Gail as Hans
- Francis Guinan as Tom
- Steve Coulter as Charles

== Release ==
The film premiered at the 2017 Tribeca Film Festival, where the jury awarded it the Best Screenplay in a U.S. Narrative Feature Film prize. Gravitas Ventures acquired distribution rights, with intentions to release the film theatrically and on demand. The movie premiered on September 29, and later streamed on Amazon Prime and Kanopy.

== Reception ==
Abundant Acreage Available received mostly positive reviews from critics. On Metacritic it has a score of 68 out of 100, based on 10 reviews. On Rotten Tomatoes it has a score of 80% based on 20 reviews.

Peter Debruge of Variety lauded Ryan's performance, stating "Only on the big screen are we able to fully appreciate the minutely detailed nature of Ryan's performance, revealing Tracy's soul via the slightest narrowing of the eyes or the almost-subliminal tensing of her cheekbones." However, Debruge expressed concern about the film's box office prospects, hypothesizing that "MacLachlan's practically mirthless approach will cost the film commercially." Rodrigo Perez of ThePlaylist.net praised the filmmaker, noting, "MacLachlan's humble commitment to the subtle features and specificity of the film is bold and mature. Most filmmakers wouldn't dare attempt to direct, much less write, a movie this spare." Perez also cited Kinney's performance as "equally compelling" in one of his "meatier roles".
