= Moonlight Mile =

Moonlight Mile can refer to:

- Moonlight Mile (film), a 2002 movie written and directed by Brad Silberling
- Moonlight Mile (manga), a manga and anime series
- Moonlight Mile (novel), the sixth novel in the Kenzie-Gennaro series by Dennis Lehane
- "Moonlight Mile" (song), song from The Rolling Stones' 1971 release Sticky Fingers
