= Terrie Hall =

American anti-smoking activist (1960–2013)

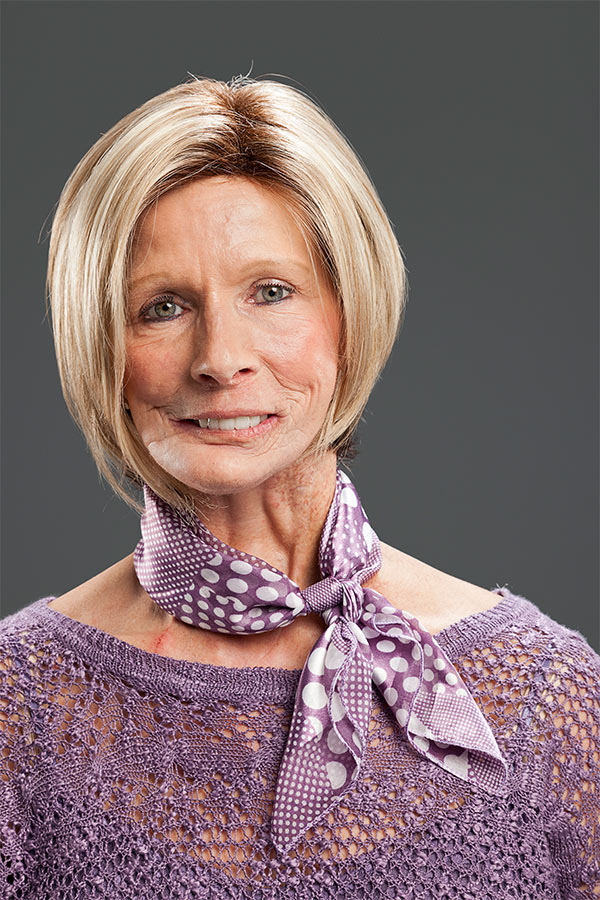
- Born: Terrie Norman McNutt; July 19, 1960; Mount Clemens, Michigan, U.S.
- Died: September 16, 2013 (aged 53); Winston-Salem, North Carolina, U.S.
- Cause of death: Smoking-related cancer
- Education: Forbush High School
- Occupations: Anti-smoking and tobacco advocate
- Years active: 2005–2013

Terrie Linn McNutt Hall (July 19, 1960 – September 16, 2013) was an American anti-smoking and anti-tobacco advocate. She was a survivor of ten cancer diagnoses, undergoing 48 radiation treatments, and nearly a year's worth of chemotherapy, before and after undergoing a laryngectomy in 2001 at the age of 40. She was well known for starring in one of the ads of CDC's smoking ad campaign, as well as traveling across America to educate youth and adults about the consequences of tobacco use. Hall died at the age of 53 following her 11th cancer diagnosis.

== Personal life ==
Born in Mount Clemens, Michigan on July 19, 1960, Hall moved to Davidson County, North Carolina in 1973 and later to Welcome, North Carolina in the late 1980s. She was divorced with one daughter in her thirties, Dana, and had three grandchildren. She considered her grandson Jeffery (born 2001/02) to be "the light of [her] life." In 2005, Dana resided in Virginia, and shortly before Terrie died in 2013, lived in Lexington, North Carolina. Terrie's mother died in August 2001, when she was 41 years old. Hall's hobbies were "trouble-shooting" and playing on the computer during her free time; she also did school presentations with teenagers. She enjoyed bowling, reading Danielle Steel books, Mountain Dew, spending time with her grandson, and people-watching. She helped her family-owned muffler and sales business.

== Smoking-related cancer ==
Hall claimed that the first time she smoked a cigarette was when, at the age of 13, she was camping with her friends in North Carolina. However, it was not until at the age of 17, when she was a cheerleader at Forbush High School in East Bend, North Carolina, that she started smoking to be with her friends, and also because her father was a smoker. Shortly thereafter, she became addicted, and within a year she would smoke two packs of cigarettes a day. She started with Vantage, switched to Virginia Slims and then Doral Menthol. Hall felt the adverse effects of tobacco at the age of 25, including a sore throat that never cleared.

Hall's cigarette smoking would also cause her daughter to be a smoker. Dana quit in January 2012 during her second pregnancy. Hall's grandchildren were both born premature. "I can't help but think it was because of my cigarette smoking," she said. "My fear now is that I won't be around to see my grandchildren graduate or get married."

In January 2001, when she was just 40, she was diagnosed with oral cancer. She recalled, "I had a sore in my mouth and had to go through all these grueling radiation treatments. It was awful." Hall continued to smoke throughout her radiation treatments, stating, "I didn't think I had to quit. The radiation was getting rid of the cancer, so I could still smoke." Later that month she was diagnosed with throat cancer and underwent a laryngectomy. She stated, "It's hard to wrap your mind around cancer, and when they told me that they were going to remove my voice box, I thought I would never speak again."

== Death ==
Hall died on September 16, 2013, at the age of 53, at Forsyth Medical Center in Winston-Salem, North Carolina, having been diagnosed with cancer for the 11th time. She was filmed by the CDC at the hospital two days before her death, and the footage was later used for two ads that started airing in February 2014. Another one started to air in July 2014. Two more ads featuring the footage started to air beginning on April 1, 2019, including one featuring her daughter Dana. Her funeral was held on September 21, 11:00 a.m., at the Pinedale Christian Church.

== Advertising ==
Hall was featured in four public service announcements (PSAs) shown on North Carolina state-wide TV networks for Tobacco Reality Unfiltered, her first one originally airing in her home state of North Carolina in 2006 and later airing in Utah in April 2011. Another PSA featuring Hall for the same organization also aired that same month.

Hall in her 2012 Tips From Former Smokers television advertisement

Hall was perhaps best known for appearing in one of the PSAs for Centers for Disease Control and Prevention's anti-smoking campaign "Tips From Former Smokers". The PSA was filmed in August 2011. Because of this campaign, calls to 1-800-QUIT-NOW doubled and visits to SmokeFree.gov tripled during the campaign. Hall stated on being in the PSAs, "I feel very honored and I really appreciate the privilege to be a part of something so positive. And I know that it will save lives and I'm glad to be a part of it." Hall also received public recognition because of the PSAs. For example, she once met a former smoker in Myrtle Beach. "She put her hands on me and she was starting to cry and she said, 'I quit smoking because of you,'" Hall recalled. "Of course, I started crying and got cold. It was pretty powerful." The advertisement, where Hall describes her morning routine, began airing in Australia in 2013. In addition, Hall was also featured in print and billboard advertisements throughout the state. Hall was honored by the Centers for Disease Control and Prevention on May 23, 2013.

== Activism ==
Hall was formerly the president of the Western Piedmont Speak Easy Club of Winston-Salem, North Carolina. She worked with the American Cancer Society as the team captain for the Relay for Life and in 2007, she was a legislative ambassador at "Celebration on the Hill" in Washington, D.C.

In December 2005, she received the Distinguished Service Award from then Lt. Governor Beverly Perdue in the preventive health area for sharing her story and for her advocacy work. In 2008, she was presented the Outstanding Service Award by the IAL in Little Rock, Arkansas. She was also awarded the Outliving Life Award in 2011, by the IAL, in Kansas City, Missouri.

Hall worked as a program coordinator for SAVE (Survivors and Victims of Tobacco Empowerment), traveling to middle and high schools throughout the state of North Carolina representing SAVE and speaking about tobacco education and advocating on anti-tobacco issues. She was invited by the Health Department of the State of Utah to come out and speak in their schools, and in April 2011, she spent a week touring eleven schools throughout the state.

Hall served as the secretary on the board of directors for the IAL. She was the chair of the Nominating Committee and the Prohaska Fund. She served on the Annual Meeting Committee and the Ad hoc VI Director Search Committee. She was formerly the treasurer and interim secretary for the IAL Auxiliary. She also previously served on the Medical Affairs Committee, Speech Standards, and Community Outreach Committees.

Hall stated, "My daughter and grandson, my stepfather, and my fellow laryngectomies are the most supportive... It makes me feel wonderful! They are very proud that I have taken a stand in a positive direction and that I am trying to help save other people's lives."

== See also ==
- Debi Austin
- Ronaldo Martínez
- Gruen Von Behrens
- Yul Brynner
