= Debi Austin =

American anti-smoking advocate (1950–2013)

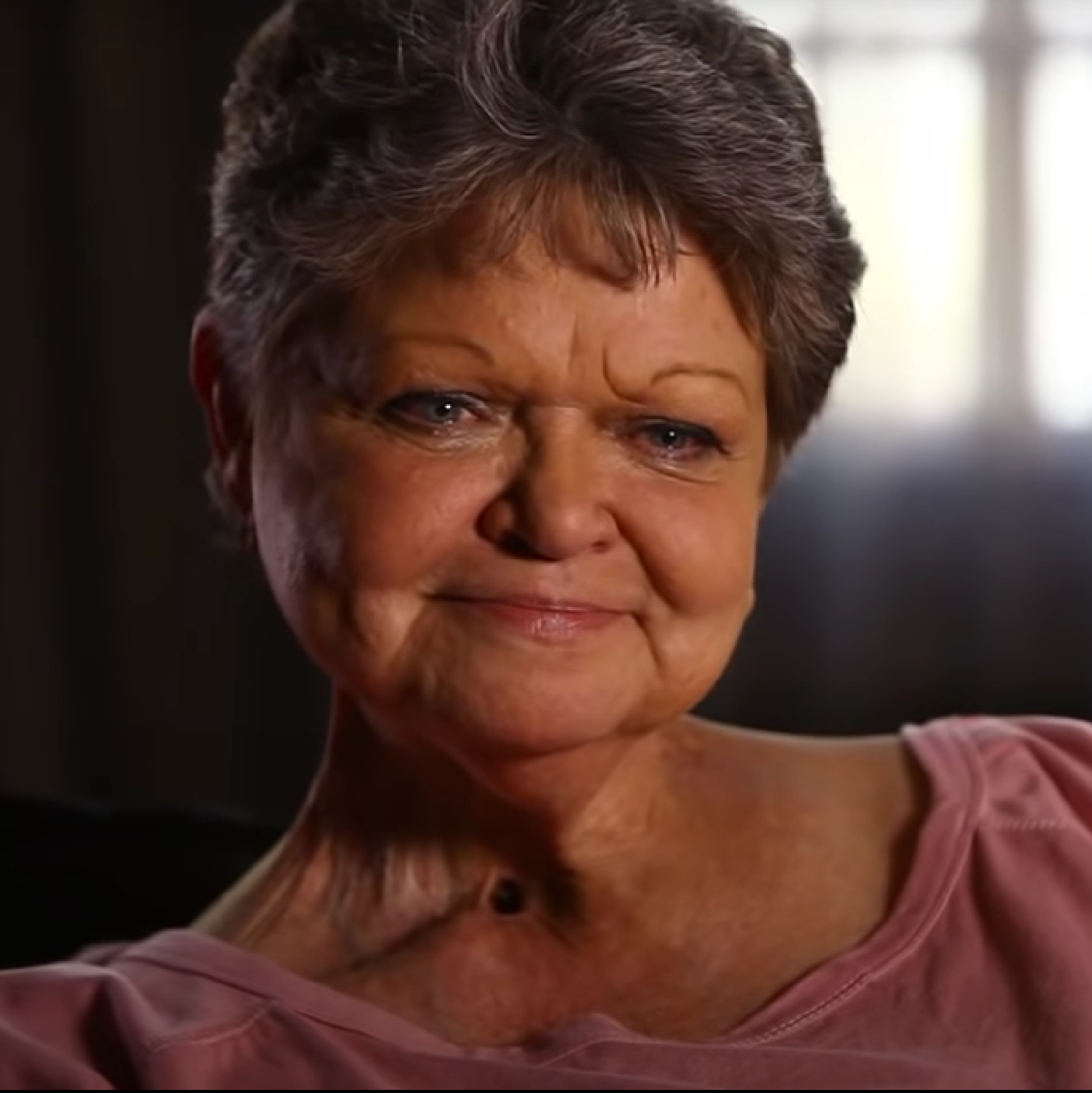
- Austin in November 2010
- Born: Deborah Austin; April 13, 1950; Illinois, U.S.
- Died: February 22, 2013 (aged 62); Van Nuys, California, U.S.
- Cause of death: Cancer
- Known for: Anti-smoking advocate

Deborah Austin (April 13, 1950 – February 22, 2013) was an American anti-smoking advocate who appeared in anti-tobacco ads that aired in California starting in 1996.

== Early life and education ==
Born on April 13, 1950, in Illinois, Austin moved to Los Angeles in 1954. She began smoking while attending junior high school in Canoga Park. Her first cigarette was an unfiltered Camel that she had stolen from her father. By high school she was smoking one pack of Camels per day. By the time she went to UC Berkeley and managed a small, private phone company, she was smoking more than one pack a day.

== Cancer diagnosis and commercial ==
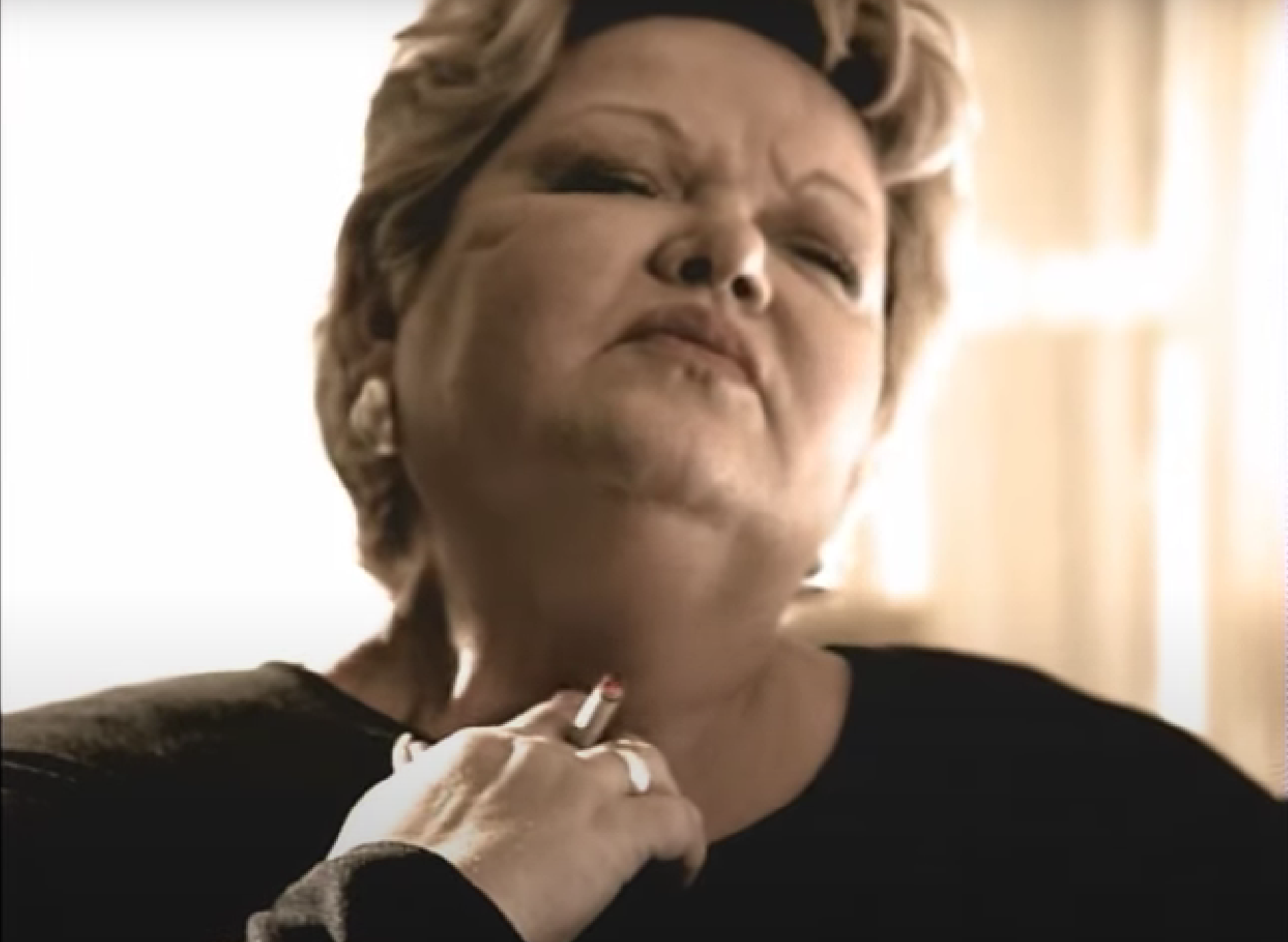
Screenshot from the "Voicebox" ad starring Austin, in which she smokes a cigarette through her stoma

In 1992, she was diagnosed with laryngeal cancer and had a laryngectomy. She starred in the well-known "Voicebox" ad, where she is talking to the viewer then smokes through her stoma at her throat, described in a statement by Dr. Ron Chapman of the California Department of Public Health as "the most-recognized and talked about California tobacco control ad." He continued, "Debi was a pioneer in the fight against tobacco and showed tremendous courage by sharing her story to educate Californians on the dangers of smoking."

Although she was finally able to quit smoking after the ads first aired, she continued to battle various forms of cancer for the rest of her life.

== Death ==
Austin died of laryngeal cancer on February 22, 2013, at the age of 62, in Van Nuys, California.

== See also ==
- Terrie Hall, another anti-tobacco activist who also died in 2013.
- Gruen Von Behrens, activist who died in 2015.
