= Forbush High School =

High school in East Bend, North Carolina, United States

Location
- 1525 Falcon Rd; East Bend, North Carolina 27018; United States; 36°08′35″N 80°33′26″W

Information
- Established: 1967 (59 years ago)
- School district: Yadkin County Schools
- CEEB code: 341090
- Principal: Robert Kennedy
- Teaching staff: 44.20 (FTE)
- Grades: 9–12
- Enrollment: 813 (2023–2024)
- Student to teacher ratio: 18.39
- Colors: Navy and red
- Team name: Falcons
- Website: fhs.yadkin.k12.nc.us

Forbush High School is a grade 9–12 public high school located in East Bend, North Carolina, United States. Typical enrollment ranges from 900 to 1,000 students. It is classified as a NCHSAA 2A high school, in the Western Piedmont Conference.

== Notable alumni ==
- Mo Cowan, former United States Senator from Massachusetts
- Terrie Hall, anti-smoking advocate
