= Moonlight Mile (novel) =

2010 crime novel by Dennis Lehane

- First edition
- Author: Dennis Lehane
- Language: English
- Series: Kenzie-Gennaro
- Genre: Crime
- Publisher: William Morrow
- Publication date: November 2010
- Publication place: United States
- Media type: Print (hardback)
- Pages: 320
- ISBN: 0-06-183692-3
- Preceded by: Prayers for Rain

Moonlight Mile is a crime novel by American writer Dennis Lehane, published on November 2, 2010. It is the sixth novel in the author's Kenzie-Gennaro series, focusing on private investigators Patrick Kenzie and Angela Gennaro. The book is a sequel to Lehane's 1998 novel Gone, Baby, Gone.

== Plot summary ==
Amanda McCready was four years old when she vanished from a Boston neighborhood in 1997. Desperate pleas for help from the child's aunt led savvy, tough-nosed investigators Kenzie and Gennaro to take on the case. The pair risked everything to find the young girl — only to orchestrate her return to a neglectful mother and a broken home.

Now Amanda is 16 — and gone again. A stellar student, brilliant but aloof, she seemed destined to escape her upbringing. Amanda's aunt is once again knocking at Patrick Kenzie's door, fearing the worst for the little girl who has blossomed into a striking, bright young teenager who hasn't been seen in two weeks.

Haunted by the past, Kenzie and Gennaro revisit the case that troubled them the most, following a 12-year trail of secrets and lies down the darkest alleys of Boston's gritty, blue-collar streets. Assuring themselves that this time will be different, they vow to make good on their promise to find Amanda and see that she is safe. But their determination to do the right thing holds dark implications Kenzie and Gennaro are not prepared for consequences that could cost them not only Amanda's life, but their own.

Since Prayers for Rain Patrick Kenzie and Angie Gennaro have married and had a child.
