= Battle of Shallow Ford =

1780 skirmish in North Carolina, US

Coordinates: 36°4′56″N 80°31′46″W

- Part of the American Revolutionary War
Date	October 14, 1780
Location	Huntsville, North Carolina, United States
Result	Patriot victory

Belligerents
(United States) Patriot militia	(Kingdom of Great Britain) Loyalist militia

Commanders and leaders
(United States) Joseph Cloyd	(Kingdom of Great Britain) Gideon Wright

Strength
300	350

Casualties and losses
1 killed	14 killed

The Battle of Shallow Ford was an American Revolution skirmish that took place on October 14, 1780 in Huntsville, North Carolina. A company of fewer than 350 mounted Loyalist militia, led by Colonel Gideon Wright and his brother Captain Hezikiah Wright, were crossing the Yadkin River and heading north west along the Mulberry Fields Road. Major Joseph Cloyd gathered 300 Patriot militia and laid an ambush about 1 mile from Shallow Ford.

Williams' troops were preparing breakfast at the bottom of the hill, along Battle Branch. The Loyalist militia, mounted on horses, appeared at the crest of the ridge above the Whig position at about 9:30. The Patriot militia opened fire at the front of the Loyalist column, causing great confusion. Only about 50 Loyalists were engaged, the remainder were spread along Mulberry Fields Road, many were still crossing the Yadkin. The majority of the Loyalists fled, however 14 were killed. One of the notable Loyalists was a Black man named Ball Turner. "...a negro, named Ball Turner, fought in the side of the Tories from Ambush near the Creek, that after the main body of the Tories had fled, Ball continued to fire at the Whigs, who, discovering his lurking place, charged upon him, + riddled his body with bullits." At least fourteen Loyalists were killed during the battle, including Captain Joseph Bryan. About 40 Loyalists were captured, many were murdered by their Patriot captors. Only one Patriot, Henry Francis, a captain in the Virginia militia, was killed, though several were wounded. A tombstone at the site of the skirmish honors Francis. The Big Poplar Tree, a landmark at the site, is believed to have been shot out during the battle.

The Battle of Shallow Ford was one of several successful attempts to delay British reinforcements to Charlotte, along with the largest Battle of King's Mountain and other small skirmishes throughout the Carolinas. Facing constant harassment from Patriot militias and unable to secure reinforcement, Cornwallis was forced to retreat south in November.

The battle shares its name with a play written by Ed Simpson, a native of nearby Lewisville.
