= Kevin McCormick (producer) =

American film producer

Kevin McCormick (born c. 1952) is an American film producer.

== Biography ==
Originally from Martinsville, New Jersey, McCormick started his career as a personal assistant to Robert Stigwood in 1974 at RSO Records in London. His first production credit was on Saturday Night Fever. McCormick then co-produced films with actress Sally Field and later had a production deal at Paramount Pictures. He later served as executive vice president of production at Fox 2000. He served as production president at Warner Bros. from 1999 to 2009. In 2009, he became a producer at their Burbank studio. He was appointed as the executive vice president of production and as a senior adviser in May 2017. McCormick is also a Broadway producer and was involved in both Charlie and the Chocolate Factory and Beetlejuice. He is on the Motion Picture & Television Fund (MPTF) board of governors. McCormick is married to biographer A. Scott Berg.

== Filmography ==
He was producer for all films unless otherwise noted.

=== Film ===
Year	Film	Credit	Notes	Ref.
1977	Saturday Night Fever	Executive producer		
1978	Moment by Moment	Executive producer		
1980	Times Square	Executive producer		
1981	The Fan	Executive producer		
1983	Nick Danger in The Case of the Missing Yolk	Executive producer	Direct-to-video	
1987	Burglar			
1991	Dying Young			
2001	Hardball	Executive producer		
2011	Arthur			
2012	The Lucky One			
2013	Gangster Squad			
2015	Ashby			
2019	The Goldfinch	Executive producer		
2019	Doctor Sleep	Executive producer		
2020	Lost Girls			
2020	The Way Back	Executive producer		
2021	The Little Things	Executive producer		
2021	In the Heights	Executive producer		
2022	Elvis	Executive producer		

Thanks

Year	Film	Role
2016	Gold	Thanks

=== Television ===
Year	Title	Notes
1987	Into the Homeland	Television film
