= Mari Gilbert =

American activist (1964–2016)

- Born: June 22, 1964; New York, U.S.
- Died: July 23, 2016 (aged 52); Ellenville, New York, U.S.
- Cause of death: Stabbing
- Occupations: Activist; television personality
- Children: Sarra, Sherre, Stevie, Shannan

Mari Gilbert (June 22, 1964 – July 23, 2016) was an American activist, murder victim advocate, and murder victim.

== Biography ==
Gilbert was an advocate for her daughter, Shannan, a 24-year-old woman from New Jersey who disappeared in May 2010. The investigation of Shannan's disappearance led to the discovery of the remains of 10 homicide victims scattered along Ocean Parkway in New York. Investigators believed that Shannan died of an accidental drowning that was unrelated to the crimes of the Long Island serial killer, but Gilbert challenged the finding and fought to have the case reopened as a murder investigation. An independent autopsy sought by Gilbert's family found that Shannan may have been strangled to death. Gilbert and her other daughters, Sarra and Sherre, frequently appeared on television shows discussing the case.

=== Death ===
Gilbert was stabbed to death by her 27-year-old daughter Sarra in Sarra's apartment building on Warren Street in Ellenville, New York, on July 23, 2016. Her daughter suffered from schizophrenia, with one report claiming that she "had voices in her head telling her to carry out the crime." Sarra was charged with second-degree murder and fourth-degree possession of a weapon, convicted of murder, and sentenced to 25 years to life in prison in August 2017. She is imprisoned at the Bedford Hills Correctional Facility for Women.

== In popular culture ==
- In April of 2012, the popular True Crime Show, Disappeared, featured Gilbert and her daughters being interviewed before Shannan's remains are discovered. Season 5, episode 14 "Footprints in the Sand".
- In the 2020 Netflix original film Lost Girls, Gilbert is portrayed by Amy Ryan.
- In the 2021 Lifetime television film The Long Island Serial Killer: A Mother's Hunt for Justice, Gilbert is portrayed by Kim Delaney.
