= St. Anthony High School (Illinois) =

St. Anthony of Padua High School

Location
- 304 E Roadway Ave; Effingham, Illinois 62401; The United States of America; 39°7′43″N 88°32′20″W

Information
- Type: private, parochial
- Motto: "Press on to the goal"
- Denomination: Roman Catholic
- Founded: 1874
- Oversight: Diocese of Springfield
- CEEB code: 141-745
- Grades: 9–12
- Gender: coed
- Enrollment: 209 (2018-2019)
- Average class size: 16
- Student to teacher ratio: 875:1
- Colors: Red, White and Royal Blue
- Athletics conference: National Trail Conference
- Mascot: Bulldog
- Team name: Bulldogs, Lady Bulldogs
- Tuition: 1st Child: Free; 2nd Child: Free; 3rd Child: $2,750; 4th + Child: Free
- Affiliation: St. Anthony of Padua Church; St. Anthony Grade School
- Website: highschool.stanthony.com
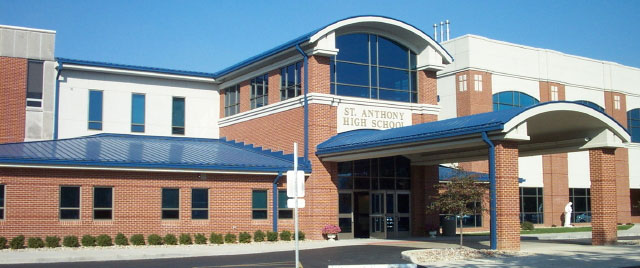
- St. Anthony High School

St. Anthony of Padua High School (SAHS) is a private, Roman Catholic high school in Effingham, Illinois. It is located in the Roman Catholic Diocese of Springfield in Illinois. St. Anthony was established in 1874 by the School Sisters of Notre Dame.

== Academics ==
St. Anthony High School offers AP classes in Calculus, Statistics, Chemistry, Biology, and English. Dual enrollment classes through Lake Land College include Composition, College Algebra, and Finite Math.

In addition, SAHS offers modified classes for those who may need academic assistance in certain areas.

SAHS is accredited by the Illinois State Board of Education and the North Central Association Commission on Accreditation and School Improvement (NCACASI), of which SAHS is a member.

== Athletics ==
St. Anthony of Padua competes in the National Trail Conference (NTC) and is also a member of the Illinois High School Association (IHSA). The teams compete as the Bulldogs and Lady Bulldogs. The Bulldogs were awarded the Program of the Year by the Decatur Herald & Review after the 2016–17 school year.

The school sponsors interscholastic athletic teams for students in bass fishing, bowling, basketball, cross country, golf, soccer, tennis, and track and field. Boys may also compete in baseball, while girls may also compete in cheerleading, softball, and volleyball.

The following teams have competed in the IHSA sponsored state tournaments or meets:

Team	State Champions	2nd Place	3rd Place	4th Place	State Qualifier	Sectional Championships	Regional Championships
Boys Baseball	2011–2012		1991–1992	1990–1991	1979–80, 83–84, 85–86	7	14
Boys Basketball	2016–2017			1977–1978	1955–56, 69–70, 90–91	6	23
Girls Basketball						0	4
Bass Fishing					2010–2011	1	N/A
Competitive Cheerleading					2008–09, 09–10, 12–13, 13–14, 14–15, 15–16	N/A	N/A
Competitive Dance			2012–2013		2013–14, 14–15, 15–16, 18–19	1	N/A
Boys Cross-Country					1976–77, 77–78, 78–79, 90–91, 2004–05, 06–07	6	3
Girls Cross-Country					1989–90, 2006–07	0	3
Boys Golf	2001–2002, 2002–2003, 2009–2010, 2018–2019, 2022–2023, 2023–2024, 2024–2025	2006–2007, 2010–2011	2008–2009		1977–78, 1999–2000, 00–01, 03–04, 06–07, 07–08, 11–12, 12–13, 13–14, 14–15, 17–18	7	20
Girls Golf	2007–2008, 2008–2009	2006–2007			1975–76, 76–77, 2005–06, 09–10, 16–17, 17–18	3	11
Boys Tennis						8	N/A
Girls Tennis						13	N/A
Girls Volleyball						6	10
Girls Softball						0	4
Soccer						0	3
Scholastic Bowl			2000–01		1999–2000	2	7
