= A Little Prayer =

2023 film by Angus MacLachlan

- Theatrical release poster
- Directed by: Angus MacLachlan
- Written by: Angus MacLachlan
- Produced by: Angus MacLachlan; Lauren Vilchik; Max A. Butler
- Starring: David Strathairn; Jane Levy; Dascha Polanco; Will Pullen; Anna Camp; Celia Weston
- Cinematography: Scott Miller
- Edited by: Tricia Holmes
- Music by: Greg Danner
- Production company: Gladness Partners
- Distributed by: Music Box Films
- Release dates: January 24, 2023 (Sundance); August 29, 2025 (United States)
- Running time: 91 minutes
- Country: United States
- Language: English
- Budget: $1.3 million
- Box office: $241,996

A Little Prayer is a 2023 American drama film directed, written and produced by Angus MacLachlan. It stars David Strathairn, Jane Levy, Dascha Polanco, Will Pullen, Anna Camp, and Celia Weston.

== Plot ==
In the small city of Winston-Salem, North Carolina, Bill runs a sheet metal factory with his son, David. Bill's wife Venida gives tours of a local historical area and David's wife Tammy works at Target. Because David and Tammy live in an adjacent house on the same lot as Bill and Venida, the four often share time in the morning and Bill sometimes drives David to work.

One day at the office, Bill notices a charged interaction between David and one of their employees, Narcedalia, while David is rallying energy for their company's weekly outing at the VFW (both Bill and David are veterans). When he confronts David about a possible affair between the two, David doesn't deny it and Bill chastises him for it before David urges Bill to stay out of his business.

Bill and Venida's daughter Patti arrives at the house unexpectedly, once again temporarily separated from her problematic husband. As Bill and Venida struggle with how they should support her and if that includes intervening, Tammy expresses infinite patience with Patti's daughter Hadley, quietly showcasing a natural parenting ability. Venida is bothered by Patti's sense of entitlement and erraticism just as Bill is frustrated with David's marital irresponsibility.

At their company's VFW dance night, Bill dances with Narcedalia, whom he catches eyeing David as he flirts with another woman. Bill asks if she knows the woman and she does, saying that it is her best friend Bethany. Bill eventually sits with Bethany. Bethany, more than a little buzzed, freely shares information about the dysfunctional nature of the romantic relationship between David and Narcedalia.

Tammy is feeling more and more lonely despite having a loving friendship with Bill, who thanks her for making his lunch whereas David does not, and both of them appreciating the mysterious singing woman in the neighborhood. She privately takes an at-home pregnancy test which comes back positive. David continues to resist Bill's attempts to push him to act better just like he tells him not to offer Patti money for a divorce lawyer.

Narcedalia resigns from the company, telling him that she got a better offer from Wells Fargo. Bill intimates that he knows about the affair by saying that it's probably for the best. He then says that he will do what he can with the bank to inflate her salary and she thanks him.

Tammy gets an abortion and Venida figures it out before telling Bill. Before the next VFW dance night Bill corners David once again, this time bringing up the abortion without naming it. David promises he did not force her to do it and is stoic about matters until Bill lays out the potential consequences of his actions and David breaks down before driving off. At the VFW, Bill notices David having an angry conversation on the phone. Assuming he was witnessing some of the heated behavior Bethany described, he goes to Narcedalia's house. A surprised Bethany opens the door, saying that she's crashing there temporarily, and she invites him in for cocoa. Narcedalia gets home soon after. She attempts to be polite with Bill, telling him the affair is over, but as he wears out his welcome, she gets worked up and shares that she is pregnant. Bill asks if the baby is David's and a defiant Narcedalia says that it is hers, implying that while David may be the biological father, he won't have a role in this child's life. She also reveals that David was verbally and physically abusive when she told him of the pregnancy and that he insisted she get an abortion.

Patti and Hadley return to Patti's husband. Bill and Tammy have a lunch date together, visiting a small and local museum before eating together on a park bench. They share a deep conversation in which Bill advises her to get out of her marriage and Tammy agrees, noting that her one regret will be leaving the abiding friendship she's created with Bill, as she believes they are kindred spirits.

== Cast ==
- David Strathairn as Bill Brass, David's father
- Jane Levy as Tammy Brass, David's wife
- Celia Weston as Venida Brass, David's mother
- Will Pullen as David Brass, Tammy's husband
- Anna Camp as Patti
- Dascha Polanco as Narcedalia
- Ashley Shelton as Bethany
- Billie Roy as Hadley

== Production ==
MacLachlan revealed to Vulture that the development of the film had started six years prior. Principal photography took place in June 2022 in MacLachlan's hometown of Winston-Salem, North Carolina.

== Release ==
The film had its world premiere at the 2023 Sundance Film Festival on January 24, 2023. Shortly after, Sony Pictures Classics acquired worldwide distribution rights to the film. However, it became apparent during the 2023 Writers Guild of America strike that the deal with Sony failed to materialize, with rights reverting to the film's producers. By May 2025, Music Box Films had acquired North American distribution rights to the film, and it was released theatrically in the United States on August 29, 2025.

A Little Prayer was released on digital VOD on October 7, 2025, and on Blu-ray & DVD on January 27, 2026.

== Reception ==
On the review aggregator website Rotten Tomatoes, 94% of 61 critics' reviews are positive, with an average rating of 7.7/10. The website's consensus reads: "David Strathairn and Jane Levy are superb in A Little Prayer, a gentle drama that mines rich emotions from commonplace dilemmas and relationships." Metacritic, which uses a weighted average, assigned the film a score of 86 out of 100, based on 16 critics, indicating "universal acclaim".

At the 41st Independent Spirit Awards, the film received nominations for Best Screenplay (Angus MacLachlan) and Best Supporting Performance (Jane Levy).
