= Lost Girls (film) =

2020 film by Liz Garbus

- Release poster
- Directed by: Liz Garbus
- Screenplay by: Michael Werwie
- Based on: Lost Girls: An Unsolved American Mystery by Robert Kolker
- Produced by: Anne Carey; Kevin McCormick
- Starring: Amy Ryan; Thomasin McKenzie; Lola Kirke; Oona Laurence; Dean Winters; Miriam Shor; Reed Birney; Kevin Corrigan; Gabriel Byrne
- Cinematography: Igor Martinovic
- Edited by: Camilla Toniolo
- Music by: Anne Nikitin
- Production companies: Archer Gray; Langley Park Productions
- Distributed by: Netflix
- Release dates: January 28, 2020 (Sundance); March 13, 2020 (United States)
- Running time: 95 minutes
- Country: United States
- Language: English

Lost Girls is a 2020 American mystery drama film directed by Liz Garbus from a screenplay by Michael Werwie, and based on the 2013 non-fiction book Lost Girls: An Unsolved American Mystery by Robert Kolker. The film revolves around the murders of young female sex workers, whose bodies are found on the South Shore barrier islands of Long Island. The murders are believed to have been committed by a suspect referred to as the Long Island serial killer. On July 14, 2023, a male suspect was charged in regard to several deaths.

Lost Girls stars Amy Ryan as Mari Gilbert, the mother of Shannan Gilbert and an activist on her behalf. Other actors include Thomasin McKenzie, Lola Kirke, Oona Laurence, Dean Winters, Miriam Shor, Reed Birney, Kevin Corrigan, and Gabriel Byrne. The film premiered at the Sundance Film Festival on January 28, 2020, and was released on Netflix on March 13, 2020.

== Premise ==
Mari Gilbert relentlessly drives law enforcement agents to search for her missing daughter, Shannan. In the process, numerous bodies are found of victims of unsolved murders of young sex workers on the South Shore barrier islands of Long Island. These are attributed to the Long Island serial killer.

== Cast ==
- Amy Ryan as Mari Gilbert
- Thomasin McKenzie as Sherre Gilbert, Shannan's sister
- Gabriel Byrne as Commissioner Richard Dormer
- Oona Laurence as Sarra Gilbert, Shannan's sister
- Lola Kirke as Kim
- Miriam Shor as Lorraine
- Reed Birney as Peter Hackett
- Kevin Corrigan as Joe Scalise
- Rosal Colon as Selena Garcia
- Dean Winters as Dean Bostick
- Sarah Wisser as Shannan Gilbert
  - Austyn Johnson as young Shannan Gilbert
- James Hiroyuki Liao as Michael Pak
- Molly Brown as Missy

== Production ==
In March 2016, it was announced that Liz Garbus would direct the film, from a screenplay by Michael Werwie, based on the book of the same name by Robert Kolker. Kevin McCormack, David Kennedy, Rory Koslow, Amy Nauiokas, and Anne Carey served as producers on the film, while Pamela Hirsch executive produced. Amazon Studios was initially set to distribute. In February 2017, Sarah Paulson was set to star in the film as real-life activist Mari Gilbert. In May 2018, Amy Ryan replaced Paulson, and Netflix was set as the distributor. In October 2018, Thomasin McKenzie (who dropped out of Top Gun: Maverick (2022) to work on the film), Gabriel Byrne, Oona Laurence, Lola Kirke, Miriam Shor, Reed Birney, Kevin Corrigan and Rosal Colon joined the cast.

=== Filming ===
Principal photography began on October 15, 2018, in New York City.

== Release ==
The film had its world premiere at the Sundance Film Festival on January 28, 2020, and was released on Netflix on March 13, 2020.

=== Critical reception ===
On the review aggregator website Rotten Tomatoes, the film holds an approval rating of 72% based on 54 reviews, with an average of 6.1/10. The website's critics consensus reads, "Raw yet rewarding, Lost Girls overcomes uneven storytelling with powerful performances and a willingness to resist easy catharsis." On Metacritic, the film holds a rating of 69 out of 100, based on 13 critics, indicating "generally favorable" reviews.
