= Angus MacLachlan =

American dramatist

- Born: March 1959 (age 67)
- Education: University of North Carolina School of the Arts (BFA)
- Occupations: playwright, screenwriter, director

Angus MacLachlan is a playwright, screenwriter, and director, best known for writing the screenplay for the 2005 film Junebug. A native of Winston-Salem, North Carolina, many of his films take place in that region of the Southern United States.

== Career ==
MacLachlan was initially educated as an actor, and graduated from the North Carolina School of the Arts in 1980. He started writing monologues as he kept auditioning, and was writing and producing plays through the 1980s and 1990s.

MacLachlan wrote a short film called Tater Tomater which was directed by Phil Morrison, a student at NYU and a childhood friend of MacLachlan; they grew up together in Winston-Salem. The short is based on MacLachlan's stage play Behold Zebulon. It was first screened in 1989 at the Rialto Theater in Raleigh, North Carolina and in 1992, both screened at Sundance and aired on PBS's American Playhouse. The short stars Beth Bostic and Mary Lucy Bivins as two servers working in a cafeteria; Bostic continually asks customers if they want "taters" or "tomaters" until she has a mental breakdown. Since its premiere the short has received praise and taken on cult film status. A now-defunct website, tatertomater.com, was launched and allowed fans to take polls, sign a guestbook, or purchase a copy of the short film.

MacLachlan's first feature film screenplay was 2005's Junebug, which was also directed by Phil Morrison in his directorial debut. MacLachlan's screenplay was nominated for Best First Screenplay at the Independent Spirit Awards. The film was also a breakthrough for Amy Adams, who received an Academy Award nomination for Best Supporting Actress.

He adapted one of his plays into a screenplay for the 2010 film Stone, directed by John Curran and starring Robert De Niro, Milla Jovovich, and Edward Norton.

In 2014, he wrote and directed Goodbye to All That, his feature film directorial debut. In 2017, he wrote and directed Abundant Acreage Available, which was awarded "Best Screenplay in a U.S. Narrative Feature Film" at the Tribeca Film Festival.

In 2023, MacLachlan wrote and directed A Little Prayer, which premiered at the Sundance Film Festival, his first Sundance film premiere since 2005's Junebug. The film was initially picked up by Sony Pictures Classics for global distribution after the festival. After two years with no release, ownership reverted to the producers, and it was eventually purchased by Music Box Films and given a limited theatrical release in August 2025. The film went on to earn MacLachlan a Best Screenplay nomination at the 41st Independent Spirit Awards.

== Filmography ==
Year	Title	Writer	Director
2005	Junebug	Yes	No
2010	Stone	Yes	No
2014	Goodbye To All That	Yes	Yes
2017	Abundant Acreage Available	Yes	Yes
2023	A Little Prayer	Yes	Yes
