= Morse and Wade Building =

Historic building in North Carolina, US

- U.S. National Register of Historic Places
- Location within North Carolina Location within the United States
- Location: 100 E. Main St., East Bend, North Carolina
- Coordinates: 36°12′59″N 80°30′27″W
- Area: less than one acre
- Built: c. 1890
- Architectural style: Italianate
- NRHP reference No.: 05000269
- Added to NRHP: April 6, 2005

Morse and Wade Building, also known as the Yadkin Valley Hotel, is a historic commercial building located at East Bend, Yadkin County, North Carolina. It was built about 1890, and is a two-story, brick building on a brick foundation. It has Italianate style design elements including arched window and door openings. The building initially housed the Yadkin Valley Hotel in the east half and the Morse and Wade Store in the west half. From about 1903 to 1940, it housed a tobacco bag factory. It is the oldest known commercial building in East Bend.

It was listed on the National Register of Historic Places in 2005.
