= Donnaha Site =

- U.S. National Register of Historic Places
- Location within North Carolina Location within the United States
- Location: Western side of the Yadkin River, east of East Bend, near East Bend, North Carolina
- Coordinates: 36°13′53″N 80°26′29″W
- Area: 24 acres (9.7 ha)
- NRHP reference No.: 78001987
- Added to NRHP: December 6, 1978

Donnaha Site is a historic archaeological site located on the banks of the Yadkin River near East Bend, Yadkin County, North Carolina. The site includes well-preserved organic remains from a village occupied between ca. A.D. 1000 and A.D. 1500. The diet of the occupants primarily consisted of wild plants and animals, such as deer, turkey, fish, shellfish and nuts. Maize horticulture supplemented the diet, rather than being a major subsistence feature.

It was listed on the National Register of Historic Places in December 6, 1978.
