= Davis Brothers Store =

Historic building in North Carolina, US

- U.S. National Register of Historic Places
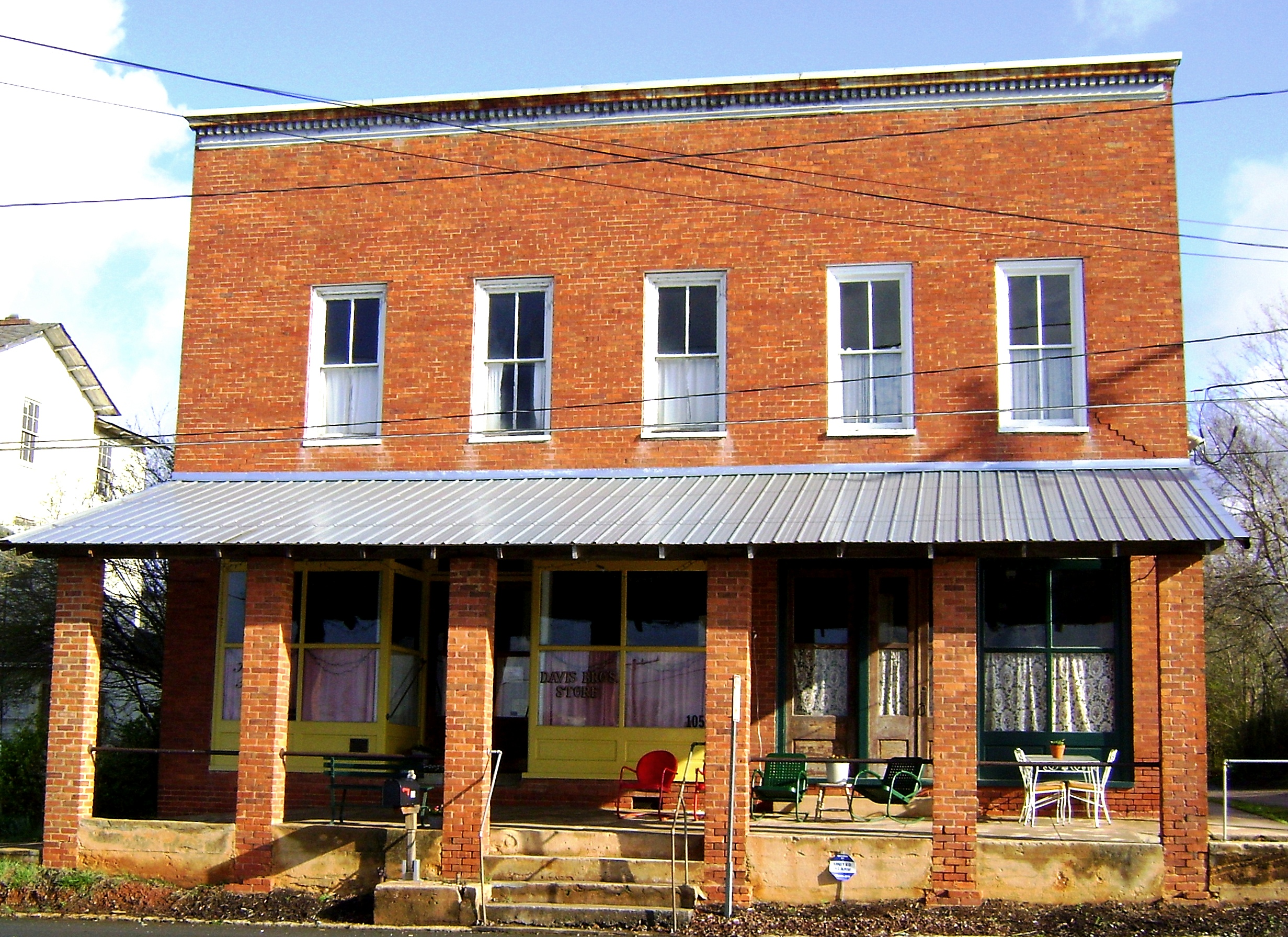
- Davis Brothers Store, March 2009

- Location within North Carolina Location within the United States
- Location: E. Main St. N side, just E of jct. with Flint Hill Rd., East Bend, North Carolina
- Coordinates: 36°13′0″N 80°30′27″W
- Area: less than one acre
- Built: 1913
- Architectural style: Early Commercial
- NRHP reference No.: 93001543
- Added to NRHP: January 21, 1994

Davis Brothers Store is a historic general store located at East Bend, Yadkin County, North Carolina. It was built in 1913, and is a two-story brick commercial building. The front facade features intact store fronts and entrances and a one-story shed-roofed canopy-like porch. Also on the property is a contributing center-passage frame storage barn dated to the 1930s.

It was listed on the National Register of Historic Places in 1994.
