= White House (Huntsville, North Carolina) =

Historic house in North Carolina, United States

- U.S. National Register of Historic Places
- Location within North Carolina Location within the United States
- Location: Shallowford Rd., Huntsville, North Carolina
- Coordinates: 36°5′1″N 80°31′43″W
- Area: 49 acres (20 ha)
- Built: 1795
- Architectural style: Early Republic, Late Georgian
- NRHP reference No.: 82003534
- Added to NRHP: June 1, 1982

The White House, also known as H. H. Sofley House, is a historic home located at Huntsville, Yadkin County, North Carolina. It was built about 1795, and is a two-story, heavy timber frame, Early Republic / Late Georgian style dwelling with a Quaker plan. It has one-story rear frame additions dated to the late-19th and early-20th century. The front facade features a double-tier, full-width shed porch.

It was listed on the National Register of Historic Places in 1982.
