= Oral Health America =

- Formation: 1955
- Dissolved: 2019
- Type: 501(c)3 Non-profit Organization
- Headquarters: Chicago, Illinois
- Location: United States
- President & CEO: Beth J. Truett
- Website: www.oralhealthamerica.org

Oral Health America (OHA) was a national 501(C)3 non-profit charity organization established in 1955 and headquartered in Chicago, Illinois. OHA connected communities with resources to increase access to healthcare, education, and advocacy for all Americans.

OHA is currently inactive and does not intend to renew active operations.

== Programs ==
=== Smiles Across America ===
Founded by Oral Health America in 2004, Smiles Across America was a nationwide campaign to coordinate schools, governments, care providers, and corporate and community sponsors to fight against tooth decay. The program incorporated disease prevention and health promotion services and community organizing to create successful models for school-based or school-linked care.

Smiles Across America provided more than $1.5 million in grant support to 15 programs operating in 47 communities in Maine, New York, Pennsylvania, West Virginia, Illinois, Nevada, Minnesota, Maryland, Florida, Colorado, Ohio, Texas, and Wisconsin.

Through Smiles Across America, Oral Health America is a partner of America's Promise, an organization founded by Colin and Alma Powell to improve the lives of children. Oral Health America committed and succeeded in sealing 1 million teeth by 2010. Smiles Across America renewed its commitment to seal an additional 2 million teeth by 2020.

=== Medical Dental Dialogues ===
In 2008, the program's topic was the relationship between periodontal disease and systemic health. In 2009, the symposium focused on collaborative health care for older adults. In May 2011, the symposium was named "Collaborative Health Care for Diabetes: A Symposium for Creating a Medical-Dental Dialogue Among Health Care Professionals".

=== NSTEP (National Spit Tobacco Education Program) ===
NSTEP encouraged young baseball players to talk to their coaches and parents about tobacco addiction and the health risks of using tobacco products, including spit and smokeless tobacco.

The NSTEP worked with Little League Baseball and Softball to educate families about the risks of spit tobacco use, including oral cancer, gum disease, tooth decay, and nicotine addiction. During the 10-Day Little League Baseball World Series, NSTEP provides tobacco and health education to baseball players and their families.

=== Campaign for Oral Health Equity ===
Oral Health America's advocacy centers on improving oral health care access; in 2009, the organization worked with the American Dental Education Association (ADEA), Dental Health Foundation, National Consumers League, Institute for Oral Health, and the Association of State and Territorial Dental Directors (ASTDD) to implore lawmakers to include oral health provisions in health reform legislation. On October 20, 2009, Oral Health America joined 140 organizations in supporting an advertisement in Roll Call (newspaper).

=== Wisdom Tooth Project ===
The Wisdom Tooth Project was an Oral Health America program that employed education and communication initiatives to inform the public of oral health's link to overall health and bring care to older adults in need.
