= Strasburg, Illinois =

Strasburg
- Village
- Location of Strasburg in Shelby County, Illinois.
- Coordinates: 39°21′00″N 88°37′19″W
- Country: United States
- State: Illinois
- County: Shelby

Area
  - Total: 0.54 sq mi (1.40 km^{2})
  - Land: 0.54 sq mi (1.40 km^{2})
  - Water: 0 sq mi (0.00 km^{2})
- Elevation: 633 ft (193 m)

Population (2020)
  - Total: 531
  - Density: 982/sq mi (379.1/km^{2})
- Time zone: UTC-6 (CST)
  - Summer (DST): UTC-5 (CDT)
- ZIP code: 62465
- Area code: 217
- FIPS code: 17-73040
- GNIS ID: 2399916
- Website: www.strasburgil.com

Strasburg is a village in Shelby County, Illinois, United States. The population was 531 at the 2020 census.

== Geography ==
According to the 2010 census, Strasburg has a total area of 0.53 square miles (1.37 km^{2}), all land.

== Demographics ==
Historical population
Census	Pop.	Note	%±
1880	104		—
1890	258		148.1%
1900	392		51.9%
1910	526		34.2%
1920	469		−10.8%
1930	418		−10.9%
1940	435		4.1%
1950	436		0.2%
1960	467		7.1%
1970	456		−2.4%
1980	488		7.0%
1990	473		−3.1%
2000	603		27.5%
2010	467		−22.6%
2020	531		13.7%
U.S. Decennial Census

As of the census of 2000, there were 603 people, 208 households, and 139 families residing in the village. The population density was 1,141.9 inhabitants per square mile (440.9/km^{2}). There were 222 housing units at an average density of 420.4 per square mile (162.3/km^{2}). The racial makeup of the village was 100.00% White. Hispanic or Latino of any race were 0.17% of the population.

There were 208 households, out of which 29.8% had children under the age of 18 living with them, 59.6% were married couples living together, 4.8% had a female householder with no husband present, and 32.7% were non-families. 30.3% of all households were made up of individuals, and 17.3% had someone living alone who was 65 years of age or older. The average household size was 2.40 and the average family size was 3.04.

In the village, the population was spread out, with 19.9% under the age of 18, 5.1% from 18 to 24, 21.6% from 25 to 44, 19.7% from 45 to 64, and 33.7% who were 65 years of age or older. The median age was 49 years. For every 100 females, there were 79.5 males. For every 100 females age 18 and over, there were 76.3 males.

The median income for a household in the village was $40,673, and the median income for a family was $43,750. Males had a median income of $28,750 versus $21,313 for females. The per capita income for the village was $16,102. About 6.0% of families and 6.0% of the population were below the poverty line, including 5.6% of those under age 18 and 9.0% of those age 65 or over.
