= Stewardson, Illinois =

Stewardson
- Village
- Motto: A great place to call home
- Location of Stewardson in Shelby County, Illinois.
- Coordinates: 39°15′48″N 88°37′44″W
- Country: United States
- State: Illinois
- County: Shelby

Area
  - Total: 0.61 sq mi (1.58 km^{2})
  - Land: 0.61 sq mi (1.58 km^{2})
  - Water: 0 sq mi (0.00 km^{2})
- Elevation: 646 ft (197 m)

Population (2020)
  - Total: 721
  - Density: 1,182.0/sq mi (456.39/km^{2})
- Time zone: UTC-6 (CST)
  - Summer (DST): UTC-5 (CDT)
- ZIP code: 62463
- Area code: 217
- FIPS code: 17-72650
- GNIS ID: 2399899
- Website: http://www.stewardsonil.com

Stewardson is a village in Shelby County, Illinois, United States. As of the 2020 census, Stewardson had a population of 721.

== Geography ==
According to the 2010 census, Stewardson has a total area of 0.6 square miles (1.55 km^{2}), all land.

== Demographics ==
Historical population
Census	Pop.	Note	%±
1880	385		—
1890	617		60.3%
1900	677		9.7%
1910	720		6.4%
1920	731		1.5%
1930	629		−14.0%
1940	659		4.8%
1950	666		1.1%
1960	656		−1.5%
1970	729		11.1%
1980	745		2.2%
1990	660		−11.4%
2000	747		13.2%
2010	734		−1.7%
2020	721		−1.8%
U.S. Decennial Census

As of the census of 2000, there were 747 people, 305 households, and 204 families residing in the village. The population density was 1,235.0 inhabitants per square mile (476.8/km^{2}). There were 334 housing units at an average density of 552.2 per square mile (213.2/km^{2}). The racial makeup of the village was 99.33% White, 0.13% Native American, 0.13% Asian, and 0.40% from two or more races.

There were 305 households, out of which 32.5% had children under the age of 18 living with them, 52.8% were married couples living together, 10.8% had a female householder with no husband present, and 33.1% were non-families. 30.5% of all households were made up of individuals, and 18.7% had someone living alone who was 65 years of age or older. The average household size was 2.45 and the average family size was 3.08.

In the village, the population was spread out, with 25.3% under the age of 18, 11.0% from 18 to 24, 24.2% from 25 to 44, 21.7% from 45 to 64, and 17.8% who were 65 years of age or older. The median age was 37 years. For every 100 females, there were 96.1 males. For every 100 females age 18 and over, there were 84.8 males.

The median income for a household in the village was $31,923, and the median income for a family was $42,000. Males had a median income of $27,981 versus $20,125 for females. The per capita income for the village was $15,586. About 10.3% of families and 11.6% of the population were below the poverty line, including 17.4% of those under age 18 and 9.5% of those age 65 or over.
