= Durrett-Jarratt House =

Historic house in North Carolina, United States

- U.S. National Register of Historic Places
- Location within North Carolina Location within the United States
- Location: 0.35 miles SW of jct. of NC 1605 and NC 1569, near Enon, North Carolina
- Coordinates: 36°7′8″N 80°29′59″W
- Area: 1.7 acres (0.69 ha)
- Built: c. 1820
- Architectural style: Federal
- NRHP reference No.: 97000474
- Added to NRHP: May 23, 1997

Durrett-Jarratt House, also known as the Isaac Jarratt House, is historic plantation house located near Enon, Yadkin County, North Carolina. It was built about 1820, and is a large, two-story, four-bay, Federal style frame dwelling. It rests on a brick foundation, has molded weatherboard siding, a gable roof and exterior brick end chimneys. It has a mid-19th century shed roofed front porch, and dining room and kitchen additions. Also on the property is a contributing commissary building. The interior features original wood graining and decorative painting.

It was listed on the National Register of Historic Places in 1997.
