= Gone, Baby, Gone (novel) =

1998 detective novel by Dennis Lehane

- First edition
- Author: Dennis Lehane
- Language: English
- Series: Kenzie and Gennaro
- Genre: Detective fiction
- Published: 1998 (William Morrow and Company)
- Publication place: United States
- Pages: 256 (first edition)
- ISBN: 978-0688153328
- OCLC: 38593676
- LC Class: PS3562.E426 G66 1998
- Preceded by: Sacred
- Followed by: Prayers for Rain

Gone, Baby, Gone is a 1998 detective novel by American writer Dennis Lehane, his fourth in his series featuring Boston private investigators Patrick Kenzie and Angela Gennaro. In 2007 a film adaptation of the same name was released, directed by Ben Affleck.

== Plot ==
Boston-based lovers and private investigators Patrick Kenzie and Angie Gennaro are hired by a woman to look into the case of her niece, Amanda McCready, whose disappearance has become an important local news story. They take the case despite the seeming reluctance of the girl's uncle, Lionel. During the investigation they quickly come to the conclusion that Amanda's mother, Helene, who has been prominently featured in the news stories about the case, is a degenerate and neglectful parent. At the time of Amanda's disappearance, Helene had left her alone for several hours while she partied at a local dive bar. In another incident, revealed later, Helene had once left her daughter unsupervised on the beach for several hours, resulting in the girl getting a terrible sunburn. While Helene has been pleading with the public for her daughter's return, in private she often seems more concerned about her own life and the possible benefit the publicity might have on it. Patrick and Angie discover that Helene had taken Amanda along while she and her then boyfriend Skinny Ray stole two hundred thousand dollars from men working for the imprisoned drug dealer Cheese.

Patrick and Angie begin working on the case with police officers Remy Broussard and Nick "Poole" Raftopoulous, members of the Boston Police Department's CAC (Crimes Against Children) Division. In investigating the missing money from Helene and Ray's drug deal, Patrick, Angie, Broussard, and Poole find the money along with two dead bodies, acquaintances of Helene's from when the money was originally stolen. The police receive an apparent ransom demand calling for a meetup at the Quincy Quarries to exchange the money for the girl. Under cover of darkness and with the area surrounded by police, Angie, Patrick, Poole, and Remy arrive at the quarry. Before they can meet the kidnappers, a confused gun battle breaks out, resulting in the death of a couple of gangsters working for Cheese and the disappearance of the ransom money. Angie finds Amanda's favorite doll, which had been taken along with her, in the water of the quarry, and they conclude that the little girl was likely thrown in and died.

Months later, Patrick crosses paths with Helene and sees her to be emotionally wrought and reeling from Amanda's death. Patrick later learns that Remy had known Lionel, Helene's brother, before Amanda's disappearance. Questioning Lionel with the aid of Justice Department agent Ryerson, Patrick and Angie discover that the whole kidnapping had been orchestrated at Lionel's behest in order to get Amanda away from Helene's neglectful care. Remy and another policeman, Pasquale, disguised as burglars, stage a holdup of the bar where Patrick, Angie, and Lionel are meeting. After it becomes clear to Patrick that the two are there to kill Lionel and end the investigation into Amanda, a gunfight ensues which ends with Pasquale dead, Lionel and Ryerson grievously wounded, and Remy fleeing on foot. Patrick gives chase to Remy, finding that Angie had shot him in the barroom melee. After refusing medical help and thereby ensuring his imminent death (and avoiding imprisonment for his role in most of the crimes committed or unearthed during the novel), Remy confesses to Patrick that he is part of a small ring of cops who take children from abusive and neglectful homes and place them with caring competent parents. The first child had been his own son, who he had found as an infant malnourished and abused in a crack house, the child's birth mother so uninterested in his welfare that she had never filed a missing persons report after Remy took him. Remy had conspired with Lionel to take Amanda from Helene's care to ensure her proper upbringing. To protect Amanda, he refuses to tell Patrick of her whereabouts before his own death. Patrick later figures that Remy and Poole's captain, Doyle, had taken custody of Amanda. Patrick, Angie, and two allied Boston cops (Oscar and Devin, from previous books) go to the captain's forest home where they discover Amanda McCready, apparently happy and well cared for by Doyle and his wife. Angie begs Patrick, Oscar, and Devin not to reveal Amanda's whereabouts, insisting that she's with a loving family now. Angie and Patrick argue about the proper course with Patrick finally supporting the decision to call the authorities to the house and reveal Lionel, Remy, and Doyle's scheme. Amanda is returned home. Remy's wife and illegally adopted child are never seen again, gone, Patrick assumes, with the two hundred thousand dollars from the botched ransom exchange. Angie, disappointed, leaves Patrick. Patrick later stops by the McCready household to find Amanda listlessly watching TV as Helene gets ready to go out on a date and leave Amanda with a neighbor, a sign that, after everything, nothing has changed.

== Adaptations ==
- Gone Baby Gone (2007), film directed by Ben Affleck
- Gone Baby Gone (2018), telefilm directed by Phillip Noyce (unreleased)
