= Huntsville, North Carolina =

Huntsville
- Unincorporated community
- Location within the state of North Carolina
- Coordinates: 36°04′56″N 80°31′46″W
- Country: United States
- State: North Carolina
- County: Yadkin
- Elevation: 863 ft (263 m)
- Time zone: UTC-5 (Eastern (EST))
  - Summer (DST): UTC-4 (EDT)
- GNIS feature ID: 987275

Huntsville is a small unincorporated community in Yadkin County, North Carolina, United States.

Huntsville was formerly chartered in 1792 by Charles Hunt of Salisbury, NC and was chartered again in 1822 (Powell 1968, p. 241). It has a Huntsville Volunteer Fire Department, and Huntsville Community Center which is in front of a baseball/softball field which is home to Huntsville little league.

== History ==
European settlers were drawn to the area as early as the 1740s because of the Shallow Ford, a natural gravel roadway under the Yadkin River. The Shallow Ford, which became part of the Great Wagon Road, was the only place in the vicinity that was shallow enough for heavy wagons to cross.

When a road was extended from the Moravian settlement of Bethabara to the Shallow Ford in 1753, the village just west of the river became a frequent stop on the stagecoach trail. From the crossing, settlers could continue to Salisbury and Charlotte then on as far south as Georgia. In 1770, the Shallow Ford became part of the western expansion as well, when the Mulberry Fields Road, and what later became known as the Daniel Boone Trail to Kentucky, opened.

The area was first known as the Bryan Settlement after Morgan Bryan, a Pennsylvania Quaker who settled in the frontier three miles (5 km) downstream of the Shallow Ford in 1748. Edward Hughes – who may have been the first settler in the region, arriving as early as 1747 – established a tavern and inn in the area.

=== Revolutionary War activity ===
The Battle of Shallow Ford was fought on October 14, 1780, between about 300 Tories and 350 Patriots from North Carolina and Virginia. The Tories, led by Col. Gideon Wright were moving on horseback into the mountains north of the Yadkin River to hideout.

The Patriot force under Maj. Joseph Cloyd of Virginia waited in ambush near the intersection of Battle Branch and Mulberry Fields Road. The Tories were strung out in a line nearly 3/4 of a mile long. As they began moving down the hill towards Battle Branch, the Patriots sprung their ambush. Some of the Tories dismounted and attempted to form a line of battle and others turned and fled. The conflict was short, hard and decisive. The Tories, badly beaten, fled and scattered.

A Black man named Ball Turner, had lodged himself on the Patriot flank and continued firing well after the rest of the Tories had fled. His hiding place was found and the Patriots "riddled his body with bullits." As the battled ended, Col. Joseph Williams, who lived near by, arrived. He found the victorious Patriots "with clubbed guns mashed the heads of the wounded Tories." He managed to put an end to the slaughter.

Fifteen casualties were reported, fourteen Tories and one Patriot, Henry Francis, a captain in the Virginia militia. A tombstone at the Battle Branch, the site of the skirmish, honors Francis. The Big Poplar Tree, a landmark at the site, is believed to have been shot out during the battle.

The battle shares its name with a play written by Ed Simpson, a native of nearby Lewisville.

On the night of January 7, 1781, Lord Charles Cornwallis led his army of 2800 British and Provincial Soldiers across the Yadkin River at the Shallow Ford. The British camped in the flood plane on the east bank of the river. Nearby, Patriot Capt. Joseph Graham was aware of the British presence and decided he would attack the British rear with a small force of Continental Dragoons as they crossed the river.

At dawn on the 8th, some of the Patriot officers climbed the hill above the west bank. Instead of seeing the British crossing the Yadkin, they were met by the sight of the British Army marching off to the east towards Bethania, North Carolina. Graham continued following the British for about five miles with 20 Dragoons. While they never attacked the British rear, they did capture six stragglers and killed a Hessian soldier and an armed Tory.

=== Establishment of town ===
In 1792, Charles Hunt purchased 250 acres (1.0 km^{2}) and began to lay out 111½ acre lots for the town. A post office was established in the town in 1795. Several stores also were established, including the Red Store, which was operated by Jacob Clingman, father of Brigadier General Thomas Lanier Clingman, who was born near Huntsville.

The Rev. Peter Eaton, who represented the area in the North Carolina Senate, petitioned to change the town's name to Eatonsville in 1807. The motion failed. In 1851, the village had 79 lots with a total value of $5,048.

=== Civil War skirmish ===
In the final days of the Civil War, Union troops under Gen. George Stoneman moved toward the Shallow Ford. About dawn on April 11, 1865, Stoneman's men met up with Confederate Home Guard. The guard, taken by surprise, put up some resistance, then fled, reportedly leaving behind a hundred new muskets. The militia had set up breastworks trenches along the west side of the river. However, the Union troops had crossed north of the site.

Stoneman's men looted and burned much of the village, including the Red Store, before heading south toward Mocksville and Salisbury.

=== Later years ===
In the 20th century, the Shallow Ford became less important as newer highways bypassed the community, and it began a slow decline. In 1920, a bridge was built north of the Shallow Ford, which ended the use of the ford.

Today, the area is primarily rural with a few historic homes surviving. However, it has experienced growth recently because of its proximity to Winston-Salem.

The White House was listed on the National Register of Historic Places in 1982.

== Notable people ==
- Thomas Lanier Clingman, North Carolina Congressman, United States Senator and General of the Confederate States Army was born here.
- Richard Irving Dodge, United States Army officer and author.
- Richard Clauselle Puryear, a U.S. congressman from 1853–1857.
