= Gone Baby Gone =

2007 American neo-noir crime thriller film by Ben Affleck

- Theatrical release poster
- Directed by: Ben Affleck
- Screenplay by: Ben Affleck; Aaron Stockard
- Based on: Gone, Baby, Gone by Dennis Lehane
- Produced by: Sean Bailey; Alan Ladd Jr.; Danton Rissner
- Starring: Casey Affleck; Michelle Monaghan; Morgan Freeman; Ed Harris; John Ashton; Amy Ryan; Amy Madigan; Titus Welliver
- Cinematography: John Toll
- Edited by: William Goldenberg
- Music by: Harry Gregson-Williams
- Production companies: Miramax Films; The Ladd Company; LivePlanet
- Distributed by: Miramax Films
- Release date: October 19, 2007
- Running time: 114 minutes
- Country: United States
- Language: English
- Budget: $19 million
- Box office: $34.6 million

Gone Baby Gone is a 2007 American crime drama film directed by Ben Affleck in his directorial debut. Affleck co-wrote the screenplay with Aaron Stockard based on the 1998 novel of the same name by Dennis Lehane. The film stars Casey Affleck and Michelle Monaghan as two Boston private investigators hunting for a young girl abducted from her single mother's apartment in Dorchester. The supporting cast includes Morgan Freeman, Ed Harris, and Amy Ryan. It was the final film to be released by The Ladd Company before its closure on December 19, 2007.

Released by Miramax Films on October 19, 2007, Gone Baby Gone was well-received by critics and grossed $34 million worldwide against a $19 million budget. Ben Affleck was lauded for his directing debut by critics, while Amy Ryan received an Oscar nomination for Best Supporting Actress.

== Plot ==
In mid June 2006, in Dorchester, Boston, private investigator Patrick Kenzie and his partner and girlfriend Angie Gennaro witness a televised plea by Helene McCready for the return of her abducted four-year-old daughter Amanda, who was last seen with her favorite doll, Mirabelle. Amid the media frenzy, Amanda's aunt Bea and uncle Lionel hire the pair to find her.

Patrick and Angie meet with Boston Police Department detectives Remy Bressant and Nick Poole, who tell them about Corwin Earle, a known child molester whom they consider a suspect. Patrick asks a criminal associate, Bubba, to look for Earle and also discovers that Helene and her boyfriend Ray are addicts and drug mules for local Haitian drug lord Cheese, and had recently stolen $130,000 from him. After finding Ray has been murdered by Cheese's men, Patrick and Angie join Remy and Nick to find Amanda, whom they now believe has been taken by Cheese. Helene reveals she buried the money in Ray’s backyard and tearfully makes Patrick promise he will bring Amanda home alive.

Patrick meets with Cheese and tries to negotiate returning the stolen money in exchange for Amanda, but he denies any involvement in the girl's disappearance. The following day, Captain Jack Doyle reads Patrick a telephone transcript of Cheese calling the station to set up an exchange for the girl. The exchange at a nearby quarry is botched after a gunfight breaks out, and Cheese is killed. It is believed that Amanda fell into the quarry's pond and drowned; Angie retrieves Mirabelle and returns it to Helene. Doyle, whose own daughter was killed years before, takes responsibility for the botched exchange and goes into early retirement.

Two months later, a seven-year-old boy is abducted in Everett, a city near Boston, and Patrick receives information from Bubba that Corwin Earle is living with two married cocaine addicts. The two visit the house and Patrick observes evidence of the abducted boy, so he returns with Remy and Nick late at night to rescue him. Before they can enter the house, the woman starts shooting and fatally wounds Nick before chasing Patrick into Corwin's room. He discovers the dead child and executes Corwin as Remy arrives and kills the woman. The following evening, an intoxicated Remy tries to alleviate Patrick's guilt, confiding that he once planted evidence to help a family escape from an abusive husband. When Remy discloses that Ray was the one who told him about the abusive husband, Patrick becomes suspicious, as Remy had previously said that he did not know Ray.

Following Nick's funeral, Patrick speaks to police officer Devin, telling him that Remy lied to him about knowing Ray. Devin tells him Remy knew about Cheese's stolen money before Cheese did. Patrick goads Lionel into meeting him in a bar and pieces together that he and Remy had staged a fake kidnapping to keep the drug money for themselves and to teach Helene a lesson, which Lionel finally admits.

Remy enters the bar wearing a mask and stages a robbery. Patrick realizes it is just a ruse to kill them, so he yells about Remy's involvement in Amanda's kidnapping. The bartender shoots Remy, but he flees, pursued by Patrick, and succumbs to his injuries. While being questioned, Patrick realizes Doyle's involvement when he is told the police do not use phone transcripts. Arriving at Doyle's house, Patrick and Angie find Amanda alive and well. He admits his part in the kidnapping and setting up the fake exchange to frame Cheese. When Patrick threatens to call the police, Doyle tries to convince him that Amanda would have a better life with him and his wife than with her neglectful mother.

Patrick discusses the choice with Angie, who says she will hate him if he returns Amanda to her mother, making the case that the girl would grow up much safer and happier if they leave her to be raised by Doyle and his wife. However, he makes the call regardless. Doyle, his wife, and Lionel are arrested, and Patrick and Angie break up.

Patrick later visits Helene as she is preparing for a date. On discovering she has not arranged for a babysitter, he volunteers. After she leaves, Patrick sits down with Amanda and asks about Mirabelle, but is told her name is Anabelle. Patrick sits in silence, and is left with a conflicting thought on whether Amanda could have a good life.

== Cast ==
- Casey Affleck as Patrick Kenzie
- Michelle Monaghan as Angie Gennaro
- Morgan Freeman as Captain Jack Doyle
- Ed Harris as Detective Sergeant Remy Bressant
- John Ashton as Detective Nick Poole
- Amy Ryan as Helene McCready
- Madeline O'Brien as Amanda McCready
- Amy Madigan as Beatrice "Bea" McCready
- Titus Welliver as Lionel McCready
- Slaine as Bubba Rogowski
- Edi Gathegi as Cheese
- Matthew Maher as Corwin Earle
- Mark Margolis as Leon Trett
- Michael K. Williams as Devin Amronklin
- Jimmy LeBlanc as Chris Mullen
- Sean Malone as Skinny Ray Likanski

== Production ==
In March 2002, it was reported that Paramount Pictures and Alan Ladd Jr. had optioned Dennis Lehane's 1998 novel Gone, Baby, Gone as a potential franchise to be headlined by Ben Affleck as Patrick Kenzie. By July of that year however, it was reported that Affleck was negotiating to instead write and possibly direct the film. In March 2005, it was reported that the project was no longer at Paramount and it had been acquired by Touchstone Pictures with Affleck set to direct and would not appear in the movie. Affleck's return to screenwriting was noted to coincide with his appearance in box office failures such as Surviving Christmas, Gigli, and Jersey Girl. On hiring Affleck to write and direct Gone Baby Gone, Ladd cited his experience with other actor turned directors like Ron Howard and Mel Gibson stating that actors have amazing insights and make good directors.

In February 2006, Casey Affleck and Michelle Monaghan had agreed to star in the film. In May of that year, Morgan Freeman was reportedly in final negotiations to join the film.

Filming took place on location in Boston (mainly South Boston), and extras were often local passers-by. Other locations used include the former Quincy Quarries.

== Release ==
Released on October 19, 2007, the film grossed $20.3 million in the United States and Canada and $14.3 million in other territories, for a worldwide total of $34.6 million against its $19 million budget.

The UK release was originally set for December 28, 2007, but was pushed back to June 6, 2008, due to the disappearance of Madeleine McCann. The Malaysian release was originally set for September 20, 2007, but was postponed to March 27, 2008, due to the kidnapping and murder of eight-year-old Nurin Jazlin.

== Reception ==
=== Critical response ===
Review aggregator Rotten Tomatoes reports that 94% of 184 critics gave the film positive reviews, with an average rating of 7.80/10. The website's critics consensus reads: "Ben Affleck proves his directing credentials in this gripping dramatic thriller, drawing strong performances from the excellent cast and bringing working-class Boston to the screen." Metacritic assigned the film an average score of 72 out of 100, based on 34 critics, indicating "generally favorable" reviews.

Peter Travers of Rolling Stone raved, "The brothers Affleck both emerge triumphant in this mesmerizing thriller." Patrick Radden Keefe criticized the film for overstating the case in an otherwise laudable attempt to "capture Boston in all its sordid glory," writing that "The result is not so much what Mean Streets did for New York as what Deliverance did for Appalachia."

Ryan's performance in particular was singled out for acclaim, resulting in wins for the Broadcast Film Critics Association Award for Best Supporting Actress and National Board of Review Award for Best Supporting Actress, as well as nominations for the Academy Award, Golden Globe Award, and Screen Actors Guild Award.

In an issue of Vrij Nederland, Dutch critic and writer Arnon Grunberg called the book good, but the movie better, saying "Gone Baby Gone might not be a perfect film, but it's an important one, if only to raise the question: 'What is home?'"

=== Top 10 lists ===
The film appeared on 65 critics' top ten lists of the best films of 2007.

- 2nd – Christy Lemire, Associated Press
- 4th – Ben Lyons, The Daily 10
- 6th – Richard Roeper, At the Movies with Ebert & Roeper
- 6th – Michael Medved, The Best and Worst of 2007
- 7th – James Berardinelli, ReelViews
- 8th – Noel Murray, The A.V. Club
- 9th – Keith Phipps, The A.V. Club

=== Accolades ===
Award	Category	Subject	Result
Academy Award	Best Supporting Actress	Amy Ryan	Nominated
Alliance of Women Film Journalists Association Award	Best Supporting Actress	Amy Ryan	Won
Alliance of Women Film Journalists Association Award	Best Breakthrough Performance	Amy Ryan	Nominated
Austin Film Critics Association Award	Best First Film	Ben Affleck	Won
Boston Society of Film Critics Award	Best New Filmmaker	Ben Affleck	Won
Boston Society of Film Critics Award	Best Supporting Actress	Amy Ryan	Won
Boston Society of Film Critics Award	Best Acting Ensemble	The entire cast	Nominated
Broadcast Film Critics Association Award	Best Supporting Actress	Amy Ryan	Won
Chicago Film Critics Association Award	Best Supporting Actress	Amy Ryan	Nominated
Chicago Film Critics Association Award	Most Promising Filmmaker	Ben Affleck	Won
Dallas-Fort Worth Film Critics Association Award	Best Supporting Actress	Amy Ryan	Nominated
Detroit Film Critics Society Award	Best Supporting Actress	Amy Ryan	Nominated
Florida Film Critics Circle Award	Best Supporting Actress	Amy Ryan	Won
Golden Globe Award	Best Supporting Actress	Amy Ryan	Nominated
Hollywood Film Festival Award	Breakthrough Director of the Year	Ben Affleck	Won
Houston Film Critics Association Award	Best Supporting Actress	Amy Ryan	Won
Houston Film Critics Society Award	Best Actor	Casey Affleck	Nominated
Irish Film & Television Award	Best International Actor	Casey Affleck	Nominated
Los Angeles Film Critics Association Award	Best Supporting Actress	Amy Ryan	Won
National Board of Review Award	Best Supporting Actress	Amy Ryan	Won
National Board of Review Award	Best Directorial Debut	Ben Affleck	Won
National Society of Film Critics Award	Best Supporting Actress	Amy Ryan	Nominated
New York Film Critics Circle Award	Best Supporting Actress	Amy Ryan	Won
Oklahoma Film Critics Circle Award	Best Supporting Actress	Amy Ryan	Won
Oklahoma Film Critics Circle Award	Best Feature Film	Ben Affleck	Won
Online Film Critics Association Award	Best Supporting Actress	Amy Ryan	Nominated
Online Film Critics Society Award	Best Breakthrough Filmmaker	Ben Affleck	Nominated
Online Film Critics Society Award	Best Supporting Actress	Amy Ryan	Won
Phoenix Film Critics Society Award	Best Supporting Actress	Amy Ryan	Won
Prism Award	Best Performance in a Feature Film	Casey Affleck	Won
San Diego Film Critics Circle	Best Supporting Actress	Amy Ryan	Won
San Francisco Film Critics Circle Award	Best Supporting Actress	Amy Ryan	Won
Satellite Award	Best Supporting Actress	Amy Ryan	Won
Screen Actors Guild Award	Best Supporting Actress	Amy Ryan	Nominated
Southeastern Film Critics Association Award	Best Supporting Actress	Amy Ryan	Won
St. Louis Gateway Critics Award	Best Supporting Actress	Amy Ryan	Won
Toronto Film Critics Association Award	Best Supporting Actress	Amy Ryan	Nominated
Utah Film Critics Award	Best Supporting Actress	Amy Ryan	Won
Washington D.C. Area Film Critics Association Award	Best Supporting Actress	Amy Ryan	Won

== Home media ==
The film was released on DVD and Blu-ray on February 12, 2008.

== Soundtrack ==
The soundtrack to Gone Baby Gone was released on October 16, 2007.

No.	Title	Artist	Length
1.	"Opening Titles"	Harry Gregson-Williams	2:56
2.	"Media Circus"	Harry Gregson-Williams	2:05
3.	"Amanda Taken"	Harry Gregson-Williams	1:36
4.	"Helena & Cheese"	Harry Gregson-Williams	1:40
5.	"Lionel"	Harry Gregson-Williams	1:32
6.	"Remy Lies"	Harry Gregson-Williams	2:32
7.	"Ransom"	Harry Gregson-Williams	6:42
8.	"3 Shots"	Harry Gregson-Williams	3:27
9.	"The Truth"	Harry Gregson-Williams	3:56
10.	"Confronting Doyle"	Harry Gregson-Williams	3:57
11.	"Gone Baby Gone"	Harry Gregson-Williams	4:51
Total length:			34:54
