= East Bend, North Carolina =

- Town
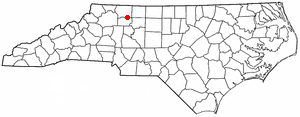
- Location of East Bend, North Carolina
- Coordinates: 36°13′04″N 80°30′30″W
- Country: United States
- State: North Carolina
- County: Yadkin

Government
  - Type: Mayor-council government
  - Mayor: Larry Adams

Area
  - Total: 1.31 sq mi (3.40 km^{2})
  - Land: 1.31 sq mi (3.39 km^{2})
  - Water: 0.0039 sq mi (0.01 km^{2})
- Elevation: 1,056 ft (322 m)

Population (2020)
  - Total: 634
  - Density: 484.5/sq mi (187.07/km^{2})
- Time zone: UTC-5 (Eastern (EST))
  - Summer (DST): UTC-4 (EDT)
- ZIP code: 27018
- Area code: 336
- FIPS code: 37-19320
- GNIS feature ID: 2406412
- Website: eastbendnc.com

East Bend is a town in northeastern Yadkin County, North Carolina, United States. The population is 634 at the 2020 census. It is a Piedmont Triad community.

== Geography ==
According to the United States Census Bureau, the town has a total area of 1.3 square miles (3.4 km^{2}), all land.

== Demographics ==
Historical population
Census	Pop.	Note	%±
1900	444		—
1910	522		17.6%
1920	508		−2.7%
1930	470		−7.5%
1940	494		5.1%
1950	475		−3.8%
1960	446		−6.1%
1970	485		8.7%
1980	602		24.1%
1990	619		2.8%
2000	659		6.5%
2010	612		−7.1%
2020	634		3.6%
U.S. Decennial Census

As of the census of 2000, there were 659 people, 271 households, and 188 families residing in the town. The population density was 514.8 inhabitants per square mile (198.8/km^{2}). There were 304 housing units at an average density of 237.5 per square mile (91.7/km^{2}). The racial makeup of the town was 95.14% White, 1.21% African American, 0.91% Native American, 0.15% Asian, 1.67% from other races, and 0.91% from two or more races. Hispanic or Latino of any race were 8.50% of the population.

There were 271 households, out of which 32.8% had children under the age of 18 living with them, 56.1% were married couples living together, 9.6% had a female householder with no husband present, and 30.6% were non-families. 28.8% of all households were made up of individuals, and 12.9% had someone living alone who was 65 years of age or older. The average household size was 2.43 and the average family size was 2.96.

In the town, the population was spread out, with 25.6% under the age of 18, 9.0% from 18 to 24, 30.3% from 25 to 44, 22.5% from 45 to 64, and 12.6% who were 65 years of age or older. The median age was 37 years. For every 100 females, there were 94.4 males. For every 100 females age 18 and over, there were 89.9 males.

The median income for a household in the town was $39,333, and the median income for a family was $49,000. Males had a median income of $32,321 versus $26,667 for females. The per capita income for the town was $17,611. About 3.3% of families and 6.3% of the population were below the poverty line, including 4.4% of those under age 18 and 14.1% of those age 65 or over.

== Nearby cities/towns ==
- Boonville
- King
- Tobaccoville
- Bethania
- Winston-Salem
- Lewisville

== History ==
=== Native American settlement ===
One of the most significant Native American excavation sites in North Carolina is located near the Yadkin River west of the town of Donnaha. Donnaha was listed in the National Register of Historic Places on December 6, 1978. Experts from Wake Forest University believe this was the site of a village of at least 100 Sioux Indians dating to the late Woodland Period.

Earl Norman, an East Bend artifact collector, donated 5,000 pieces of his collection of more than 10,000 relics to the North Carolina Department of Archives and History in 1960.

=== Establishment of town ===
East Bend was first known as Banner's Store. It was named for merchant Martin Luther Banner. Early settler Martin Luther Banner later moved west and founded Banner Elk, North Carolina.

On March 7, 1887, the General Assembly incorporated the town of East Bend and named it after the east bend of the Yadkin River. Officers were mayor J.H Johnson; commissioners Dr. Evan Benbow, J.H. Jenkins, J.A. Martin, Dr. W.E. Benbow, and J.G. Huff; and constable J.M. Whittington.

J.G. Huff established the first buggy-manufacturing business in town in 1873. The Huff Buggy Factory, built in 1893, was said to be the largest buggy factory in the South. Huff closed the buggy works about 1920 and began operating a funeral home, which is still owned and operated by his heirs.

The Yadkin Ripple, a weekly newspaper still published in Yadkin County, began in East Bend in 1896.

In 1904, the town's population was 444 and it boasted a hotel, two buggy factories, a tobacco bag factory, a bank, and several stores. However, a decision by the Southern Railroad to bypass the town 1890 put a damper on the town's growth. Roger Moore, now a film critic for The Orlando Sentinel, compared East Bend to Lake Wobegon, "It's a homey town with a lot of history and a few 'might-have-beens,' " Moore wrote in The Winston-Salem Journal.

The Yadkin County Agricultural Fair was held in East Bend from 1914 until 1978. The fair was first held at the old schoolhouse and in later years was moved to a tract east of town on North Carolina Highway 67. The fairgrounds were later converted to a community softball park.

== Education ==
=== Public schools ===
Most children in town attend East Bend Elementary School, a kindergarten through sixth-grade public community school at N.C. Highway 67 Bypass and Flint Hill Road. The school traces its history back to the East Bend Academy, which operated from 1856-1889. In 1890, it became known as Union High School. Most of the high school and its records burned in 1964. It was rebuilt at the site and became an elementary-only school after countywide consolidation in 1967.

East Bend is one of five feeder schools for Forbush High School and the newly built middle school, which is located in the ZIP code area of East Bend south of town. Two other elementary schools are located in the East Bend ZIP code area, Forbush and Fall Creek.

== Attractions ==
- Yadkin Islands Park, part of Pilot Mountain State Park, is located about two miles north of town.
- Davis Brothers Store, which was a general store in the early 20th century on Main Street, has been renovated and is now an Italian restaurant. Scenes from Two Soldiers, which won the 2004 Academy Award for best live action short film, were filmed in front of Davis Brothers and the old Morse and Wade Building, a turn-of the century building that was on the National Registry but torn down in 2006.
- East Bend is located in the Yadkin Valley AVA, an American Viticultural Area.
- In addition to the Davis Brothers Store, the Donnaha Site and Morse and Wade Building are listed on the National Register of Historic Places.

== Notable people ==
- Terrie Hall (b. 1960), head and neck cancer survivor and anti-smoking advocate
- John Hanks, cousin of Nancy Hanks Lincoln, mother of Abraham Lincoln
- Joseph J. Kinyoun was the founder and first director 1887-1899 of the United States' Hygienic Laboratory, the predecessor of the National Institutes of Health
- Ben Neill, Jr., trumpeter and composer
- Ernie Shore, Boston Red Sox and New York Yankees pitcher
