= 3rd International Cinephile Society Awards =

- Description: Honoring films screened worldwide in 2005.
- Date: June 14, 2006
- Presented by: International Cinephile Society
- Rewards: Best Film: United States Brokeback Mountain; Best Director: Canada David Cronenberg – A History of Violence; Best Ensemble: United States Good Night, and Good Luck.
- Website: icsfilm.org

The 3rd International Cinephile Society Awards were held in 2006.

== Awards and nominations ==
The winning film is highlighted in gold.

=== Best Film ===
| Country | Title | Director |
|---|---|---|
| Hong Kong | 2046 | Wong Kar-Wai |
| United States | A History of Violence | David Cronenberg |
| United States | Brokeback Mountain | Ang Lee |
| United States | Capote | Bennett Miller |
| Germany | Downfall | Oliver Hirschbiegel |
| United States | Good Night, and Good Luck. | George Clooney |
| United States | Junebug | Phil Morrison |
| United States | Munich | Steven Spielberg |
| United Kingdom | The Constant Gardener | Fernando Meirelles |
| United States | The New World | Terrence Malick |

=== Best Non-English Language Film ===
This category has since been discontinued. It was presented for the last time at the 16th edition of the awards. Starting from the 17th edition, the Best Film and Best Non-English Language Film categories were merged into a single Best Film category with no distinction by origin.

| Country | Title | Director |
|---|---|---|
| Hong Kong | 2046 | Wong Kar-Wai |
| France | Caché | Michael Haneke |
| Republic of China | Café Lumière | Hou Hsiao-Hsien |
| Germany | Downfall | Oliver Hirschbiegel |
| Germany | Head-On | Fatih Akin |
| France | Kings and Queen | Arnaud Desplechin |
| Japan | Nobody Knows | Hirokazu Koreeda |
| France | The Beat That My Heart Skipped | Jacques Audiard |
| China | The World | Jia Zhangke |
| Thailand | Tropical Malady | Apichatpong Weerasethakul |

=== Other categories ===
==== Best Director ====
- Ang Lee – Brokeback Mountain
- David Cronenberg – A History of Violence

==== Best Actor ====
- Bruno Ganz – Downfall
- Heath Ledger – Brokeback Mountain

==== Best Actress ====
- Emmanuelle Devos – Kings and Queen
- Naomi Watts – King Kong

==== Best Supporting Actor ====
- Jake Gyllenhaal – Brokeback Mountain
- William Hurt – A History of Violence

==== Best Supporting Actress ====
- Amy Adams – Junebug
- Zhang Ziyi – 2046

==== Best Ensemble Cast ====
- 2046
- Good Night, and Good Luck.

==== Best Original Screenplay ====
- Good Night, and Good Luck. – George Clooney, Grant Heslov
- Junebug – Angus MacLachlan

==== Best Adapted Screenplay ====
- A History of Violence – Josh Olson
- Brokeback Mountain – Larry McMurtry, Diana Ossanai
- Capote – Dan Futterman

==== Best Cinematography ====
- 2046 – Christopher Doyle, Pun-Leung Kwan, Yiu-Fai Laii
- Brokeback Mountain – Rodrigo Prieto
- The Constant Gardener – César Charlone

==== Best Production Design ====
- 2046 – William Chang
- King Kong – Grant Major

==== Best Original Score ====
- Brokeback Mountain – Gustavo Santaolalla
- Pride and Prejudice – Dario Marianelli

==== Best Documentary ====
- Grizzly Man
- March of the Penguins
- Rize
