= List of Amy Adams performances =

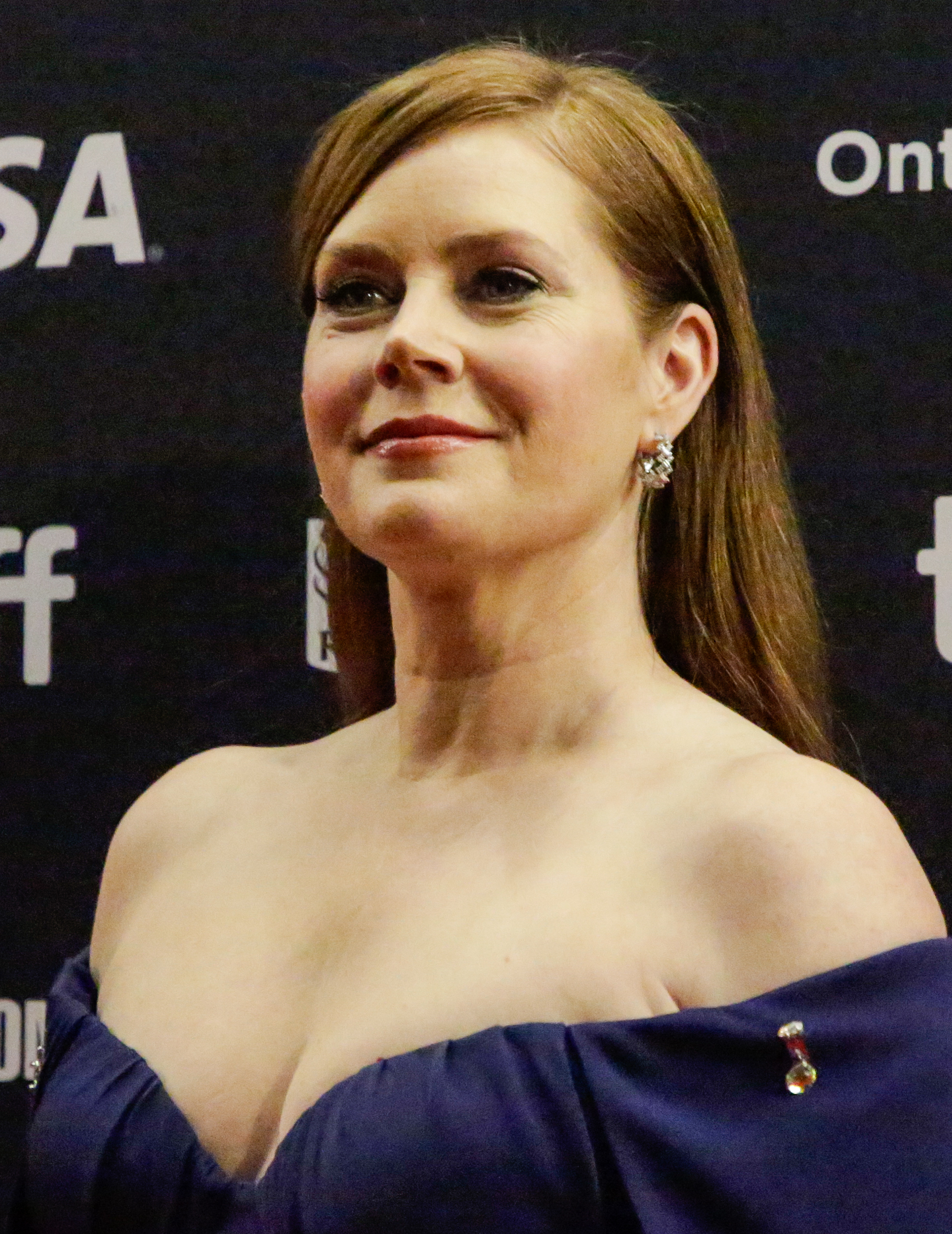
Adams in 2024

Amy Adams is an American actress who made her film debut in the 1999 black comedy Drop Dead Gorgeous. She went on to guest star in a variety of television shows, including That '70s Show, Charmed, Buffy the Vampire Slayer, and The Office, and also appeared in minor film roles. In 2002, she had her first major role in Steven Spielberg's biographical crime drama Catch Me If You Can. However, the film did not launch her career, as Spielberg had hoped. Three years later, she had her breakthrough by playing a joyful pregnant woman in Junebug (2005), for which she received her first Academy Award for Best Supporting Actress nomination. Two years later, Adams starred in the Disney romantic comedy Enchanted, for which she was nominated for her first Golden Globe Award for Best Actress (Comedy or Musical).

In 2008, Adams played a naive nun in the drama Doubt, opposite Philip Seymour Hoffman and Meryl Streep, for which she received her second Oscar nomination for Best Supporting Actress. She then appeared in the comedy-drama Julie & Julia, co-starring Streep, and played Amelia Earhart in the adventure comedy sequel Night at the Museum: Battle of the Smithsonian (both 2009). The following year, she expanded into dramatic roles by playing a tough barmaid in David O. Russell's sports drama The Fighter (2010), which gained her a third Academy Award nomination for Best Supporting Actress. Following a role in the musical comedy The Muppets (2011), Adams played the strong-willed wife of a cult leader in Paul Thomas Anderson's drama The Master, opposite Hoffman. Her performance in the latter earned her a fourth Best Supporting Actress nomination at the Oscars.

Among her three film releases of 2013, Adams played Lois Lane in the superhero film Man of Steel, and starred as a con woman in Russell's crime comedy American Hustle (2013). For the latter, she won the Golden Globe Award for Best Actress (Comedy or Musical) and received her first Academy Award for Best Actress nomination. She next portrayed the artist Margaret Keane in Tim Burton's biopic Big Eyes (2014), for which she won a second consecutive Golden Globe Award for Best Actress (Comedy or Musical), becoming the fourth actress to achieve this feat. (Note: The three previous actresses to have done so are: Rosalind Russell, Julie Andrews, and Kathleen Turner.) In 2016, she reprised her role of Lane in Batman v Superman: Dawn of Justice, her highest-grossing release. In the same year, Adams played intellectual women troubled by their memories in the science fiction film Arrival and the psychological thriller Nocturnal Animals, to positive reviews. She went on to gain acclaim and a Primetime Emmy Award nomination for playing a self-harming reporter in the HBO thriller miniseries Sharp Objects (2018), and she received another Oscar nomination for portraying Lynne Cheney in the satirical film Vice (2018).

== Film ==
Key
†	Denotes films that have not yet been released

Year	Title	Role	Notes	Ref.
1999	Drop Dead Gorgeous	Leslie Miller		
2000	Psycho Beach Party	Marvel Ann		
2000	The Chromium Hook	Jill Royaltuber	Short film	
2000	Cruel Intentions 2	Kathryn Merteuil	Direct-to-video	
2002	The Slaughter Rule	Doreen		
2002	Pumpkin	Alex		
2002	Serving Sara	Kate		
2002	Catch Me If You Can	Brenda Strong		
2004	The Last Run	Alexis		
2005	The Wedding Date	Amy Ellis		
2005	Standing Still	Elise		
2005	Junebug	Ashley Johnsten		
2005	Stephen Tobolowsky's Birthday Party	Herself	Documentary	
2006	Pennies	Charlotte Brown	Short film	
2006	Talladega Nights: The Ballad of Ricky Bobby	Susan		
2006	Tenacious D in The Pick of Destiny	Gorgeous Woman		
2006	The Ex	Abby March		
2007	Underdog	Sweet Polly Purebred	Voice	
2007	Enchanted	Giselle	Also voice	
2007	Charlie Wilson's War	Bonnie Bach		
2008	Sunshine Cleaning	Rose Lorkowski		
2008	Miss Pettigrew Lives for a Day	Delysia Lafosse		
2008	Doubt	Sister James		
2009	Night at the Museum: Battle of the Smithsonian	Amelia Earhart / Tess		
2009	Julie & Julia	Julie Powell		
2009	Moonlight Serenade	Chloe		
2010	Leap Year	Anna Brady		
2010	Love & Distrust	Charlotte Brown	Segment: "Pennies"	
2010	The Fighter	Charlene Fleming		
2011	The Muppets	Mary		
2012	On the Road	Jane		
2012	The Master	Peggy Dodd		
2012	Trouble with the Curve	Mickey Lobel		
2013	Man of Steel	Lois Lane		
2013	Her	Amy		
2013	American Hustle	Sydney Prosser		
2014	Lullaby	Emily		
2014	Big Eyes	Margaret Keane		
2016	Batman v Superman: Dawn of Justice	Lois Lane		
2016	Arrival	Dr. Louise Banks		
2016	Nocturnal Animals	Susan Morrow		
2017	Justice League	Lois Lane		
2018	Vice	Lynne Cheney		
2020	Hillbilly Elegy	Bev Vance		
2021	Zack Snyder's Justice League	Lois Lane	Director's cut of Justice League	
2021	The Woman in the Window	Dr. Anna Fox		
2021	Dear Evan Hansen	Cynthia Murphy		
2022	Sam & Kate	—N/a	Executive producer only	
2022	Disenchanted	Giselle	Also voice and producer	
2024	Nightbitch	Mother	Also producer	
2026	At the Sea	Laura Baum		
2026	Klara and the Sun	Chrissie		
2027	Star Wars: Starfighter †	TBA	Post-production	

== Television ==
Year	Title	Role	Notes	Ref(s)
2000	That '70s Show	Kat Peterson	Episode: "Burning Down the House"	
2000	Charmed	Maggie Murphy	Episode: "Murphy's Luck"	
2000	Zoe, Duncan, Jack and Jane	Dinah	Episode: "Tall, Dark, and Duncan's Boss"	
2000	Providence	Becka	Episode: "The Good Doctor"	
2000	Buffy the Vampire Slayer	Beth Maclay	Episode: "Family"	
2000	The Peter Principle	Susan	TV film	
2001	Smallville	Jodi Melville	Episode: "Craving"	
2002	The West Wing	Cathy	Episode: "20 Hours in America (Part 1)"	
2004	King of the Hill	Misty / Merilynn / Sunshine (voices)	Episodes: "My Hair Lady", "Cheer Factor"	
2004	Dr. Vegas	Alice Doherty	5 episodes	
2005−2006	The Office	Katy	3 episodes	
2008, 2014	Saturday Night Live	Host	Episodes: "Amy Adams / Vampire Weekend"; "Amy Adams / One Direction"	
2011	Sesame Street	Herself	Episode: "Cast Iron Cooks"	
2018	Sharp Objects	Camille Preaker	8 episodes; also executive producer	
2025	Charlotte's Web	Charlotte	Voice; 3 episodes	
2026	Cape Fear	Anna Bowden	Miniseries; also executive producer	

== Theater ==
Year	Title	Role	Venue	Ref.
2012	Into the Woods	The Baker's Wife	Delacorte Theater	
2022	The Glass Menagerie	Amanda Wingfield	Duke of York's Theatre, West End debut	

== Music videos ==
Year	Title	Artist(s)	Director	Role	Ref.
2008	"Hero Song"	The Lonely Island	Akiva Schaffer	Woman in Danger	
2020	"Imagine"	Gal Gadot & Friends	None	Herself	

== Discography ==
Year	Soundtrack	Song	Ref.
2007	Enchanted	"True Love's Kiss"	
2007	Enchanted	"Happy Working Song"	
2007	Enchanted	"That's How You Know"	
2008	Miss Pettigrew Lives for a Day	"If I Didn't Care"	
2011	The Muppets	"Life's a Happy Song"	
2011	The Muppets	"Me Party"	
2011	The Muppets	"Life's a Happy Song Finale"	
2021	Dear Evan Hansen	"Requiem"	
2022	Disenchanted	"Even More Enchanted"	
2022	Disenchanted	"Fairytale Life (The Wish)"	
2022	Disenchanted	"Fairytale Life (After the Spell)"	
2022	Disenchanted	"Badder"	
2022	Disenchanted	"Love Power (Reprise)"	
2022	Disenchanted	"Even More Enchanted (Finale)"	

== See also ==
- List of awards and nominations received by Amy Adams
