= Gotham Independent Film Awards 2005 =

Annual US film awards ceremony

15th Annual Gotham Independent Film Awards
- Date: November 30, 2005
- Country: United States
- Presented by: Independent Filmmaker Project
- Hosted by: Kyra Sedgwick

Highlights
- Most wins: Capote (2)
- Most nominations: Brokeback Mountain, Capote, Junebug, Keane, and Me and You and Everyone We Know (2)
- Best Feature: Capote
- Breakthrough Director: Bennett Miller – Capote
- Website: https://gotham.ifp.org

The 15th Annual Gotham Independent Film Awards, presented by the Independent Filmmaker Project, were held on November 30, 2005 and were hosted by Kyra Sedgwick. The nominees were announced on October 25, 2005.

== Winners and nominees ==
Best Feature: Capote; Brokeback Mountain; A History of Violence; Keane; Me and You and Everyone We Know	Best Documentary Feature: Murderball; Ballets Russes; Enron: The Smartest Guys in the Room; Grizzly Man; William Eggleston in the Real World
Breakthrough Director: Bennett Miller – Capote; Miranda July – Me and You and Everyone We Know; Phil Morrison – Junebug; Andrew Wagner – The Talent Given Us; Alice Wu – Saving Face	Breakthrough Actor: Amy Adams – Junebug as Ashley Johnsten; Camilla Belle – The Ballad of Jack and Rose as Rose Slavin; Joseph Gordon-Levitt – Mysterious Skin as Neil McCormick; Terrence Howard – Hustle & Flow as DJay; Damian Lewis – Keane as William Keane
Best Ensemble Performance: The Squid and the Whale – William Baldwin, Jeff Daniels, Jesse Eisenberg, Owen Kline, Laura Linney, and Anna Paquin; Brokeback Mountain – Linda Cardellini, Anna Faris, Jake Gyllenhaal, Anne Hathaway, Heath Ledger, Randy Quaid, and Michelle Williams; Crash – Chris "Ludacris" Bridges, Sandra Bullock, Don Cheadle, Matt Dillon, Jennifer Esposito, William Fichtner, Brendan Fraser, Nona Gaye, Terrence Howard, Thandie Newton, Michael Peña, Ryan Phillippe, and Larenz Tate; Good Night, and Good Luck – Patricia Clarkson, George Clooney, Jeff Daniels, Robert Downey Jr., Frank Langella, and David Strathairn; Nine Lives – Kathy Baker, Amy Brenneman, Elpidia Carrillo, Glenn Close, Stephen Dillane, Dakota Fanning, William Fichtner, Lisa Gay Hamilton, Jason Isaacs, Joe Mantegna, Ian McShane, Molly Parker, Mary Kay Place, Sydney Tamiia Poitier, Aidan Quinn, Miguel Sandoval, Amanda Seyfried, Sissy Spacek, and Robin Wright Penn	Best Film Not Playing at a Theater Near You: I Am a Sex Addict; Al otro lado; In a Nutshell: A Portrait of Elizabeth Tashjian; Police Beat; Sir! No Sir!

== Special awards ==
=== Celebrate New York Award ===
- Mad Hot Ballroom

=== Gotham Tributes ===
- Matt Dillon
- Jim Jarmusch
