= San Francisco Film Critics Circle Awards 2005 =

Annual US film awards ceremony

4th SFFCC Awards

December 12, 2005

Best Picture:
Brokeback Mountain

The 4th San Francisco Film Critics Circle Awards, honoring the best in film for 2005, were given on 12 December 2005.

== Winners ==
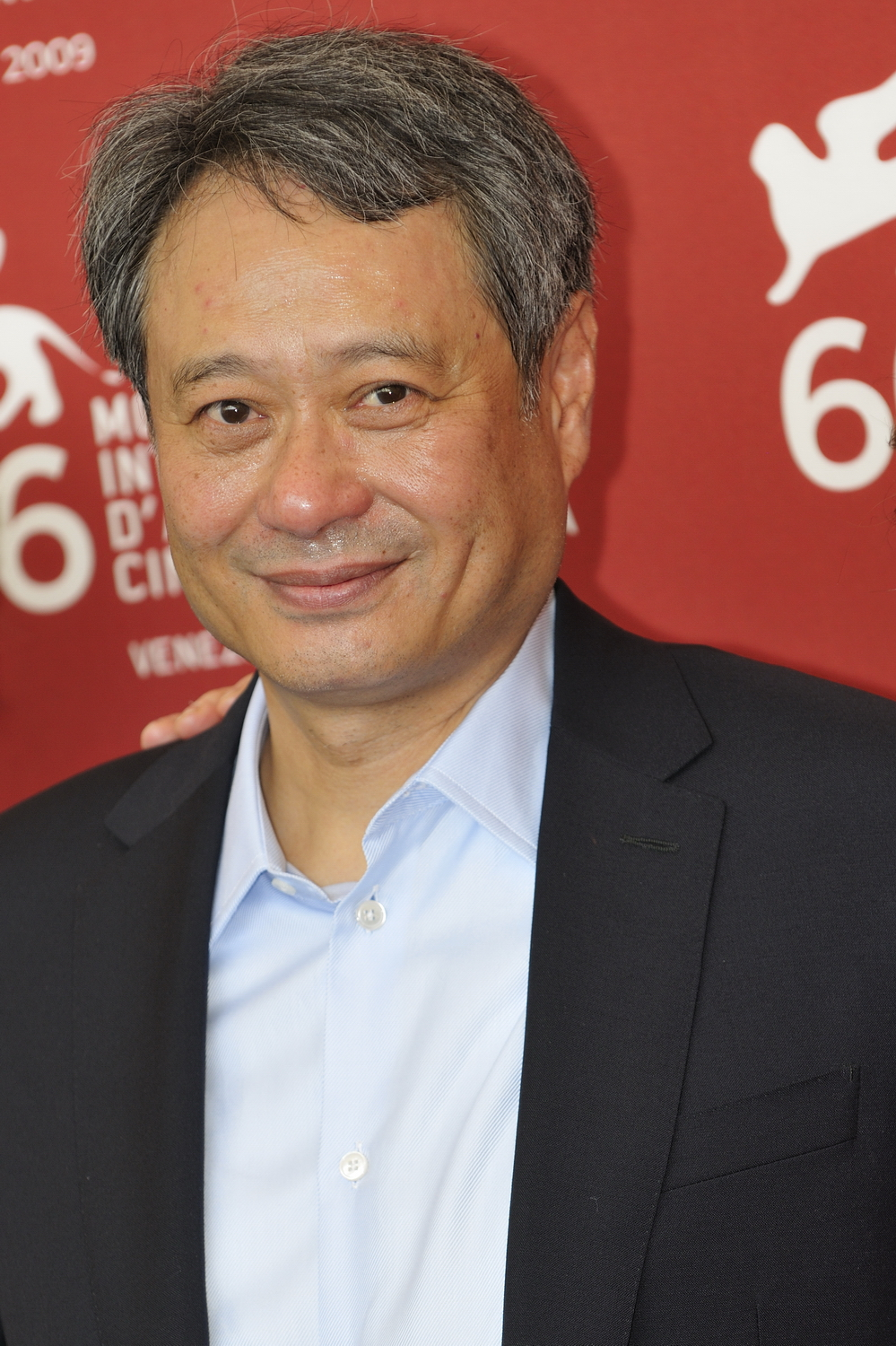
Ang Lee, Best Director winner

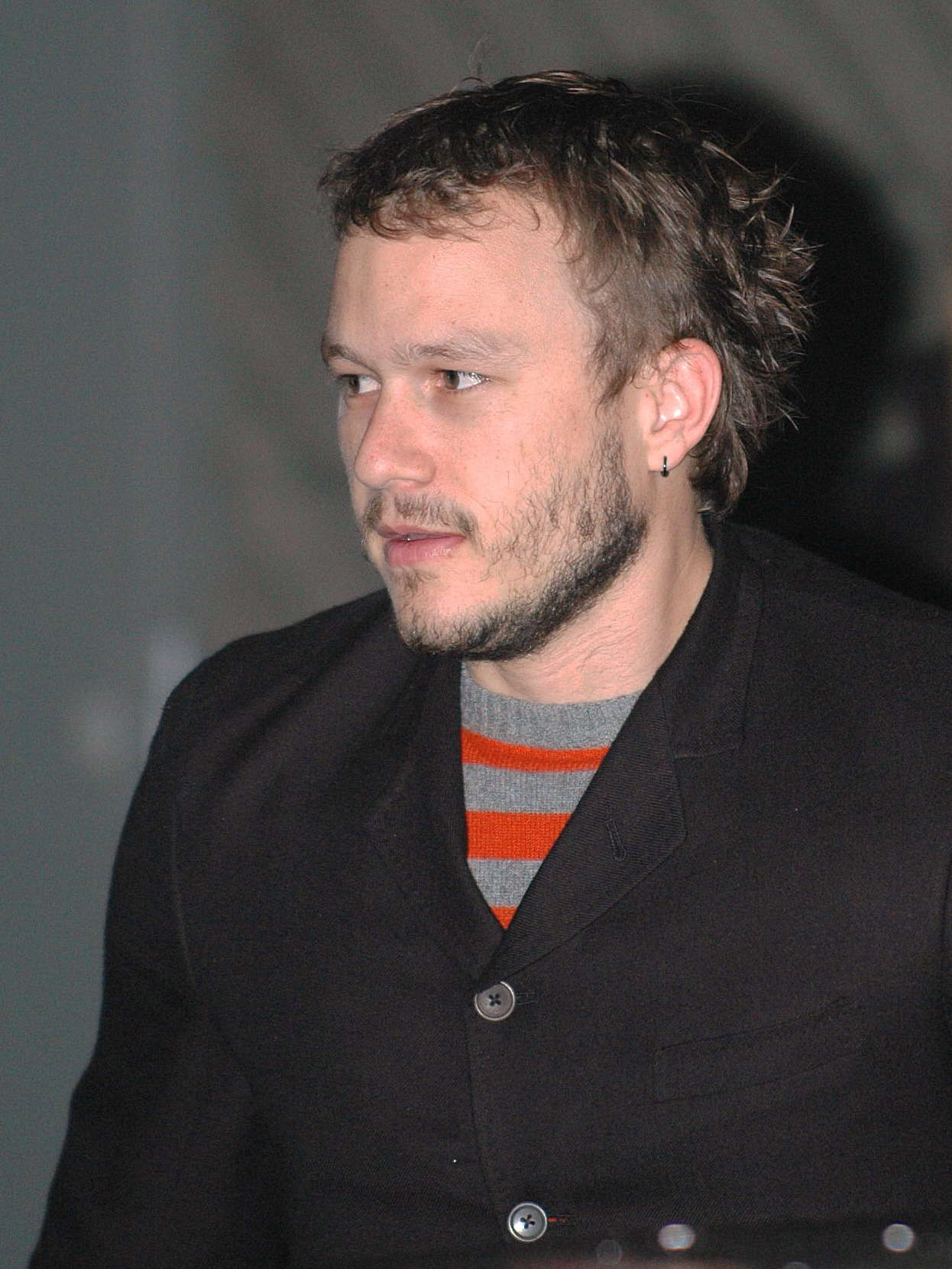
Heath Ledger, Best Actor winner

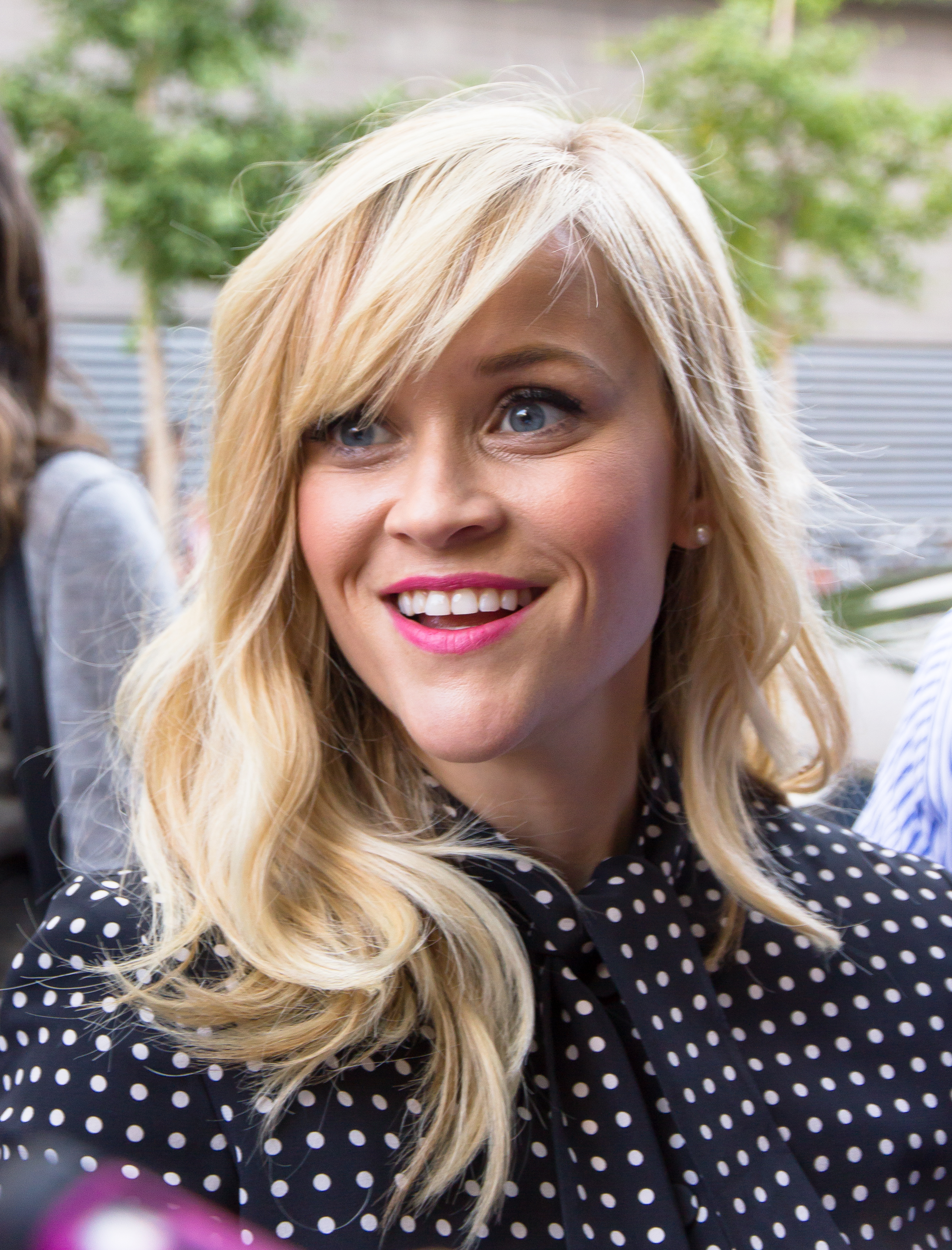
Reese Witherspoon, Best Actress winner

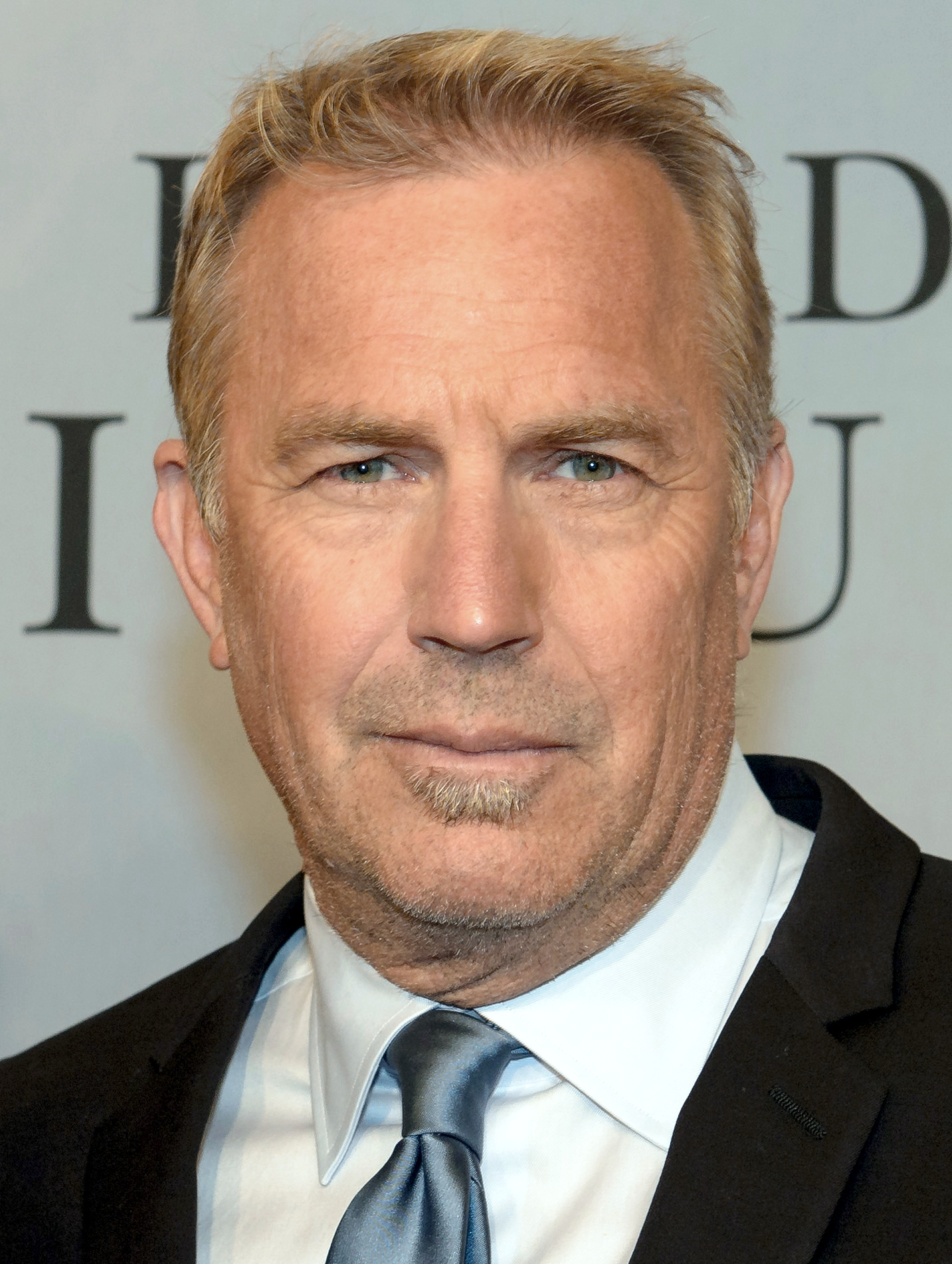
Kevin Costner, Best Supporting Actor winner

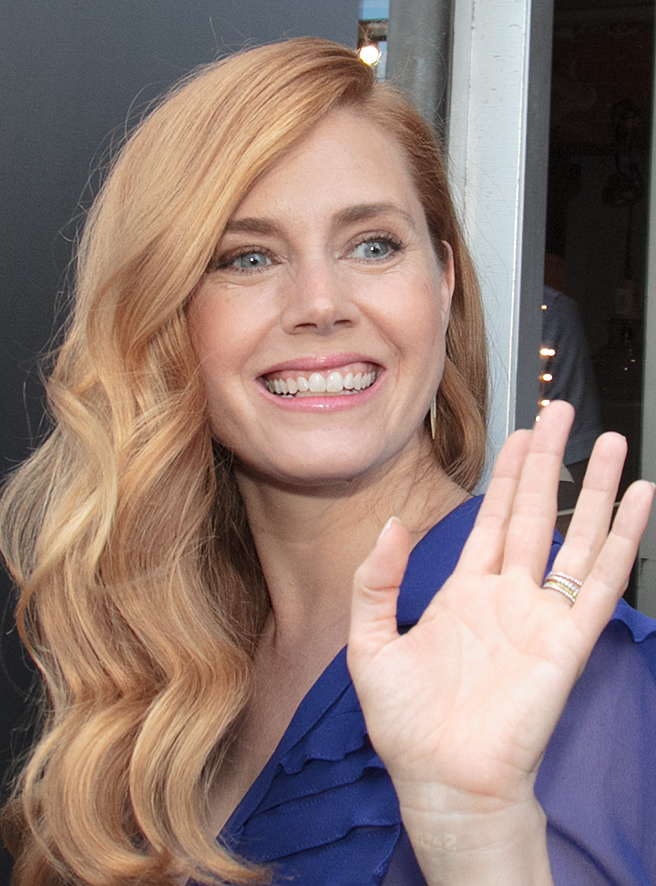
Amy Adams, Best Supporting Actress winner

- Best Picture:
  - Brokeback Mountain
- Best Director:
  - Ang Lee - Brokeback Mountain
- Best Screenplay:
  - Good Night, and Good Luck. - George Clooney and Grant Heslov
- Best Actor:
  - Heath Ledger - Brokeback Mountain
- Best Actress:
  - Reese Witherspoon - Walk the Line
- Best Supporting Actor:
  - Kevin Costner - The Upside of Anger
- Best Supporting Actress:
  - Amy Adams - Junebug
- Best Foreign Language Film:
  - Caché • France/Austria/Germany/Italy/United States
- Best Documentary:
  - Grizzly Man
- Marlon Riggs Award (for courage & vision in the Bay Area film community):
  - Jenni Olson - The Joy of Life
