= List of awards and nominations received by Amy Adams =

Amy Adams awards and nominations
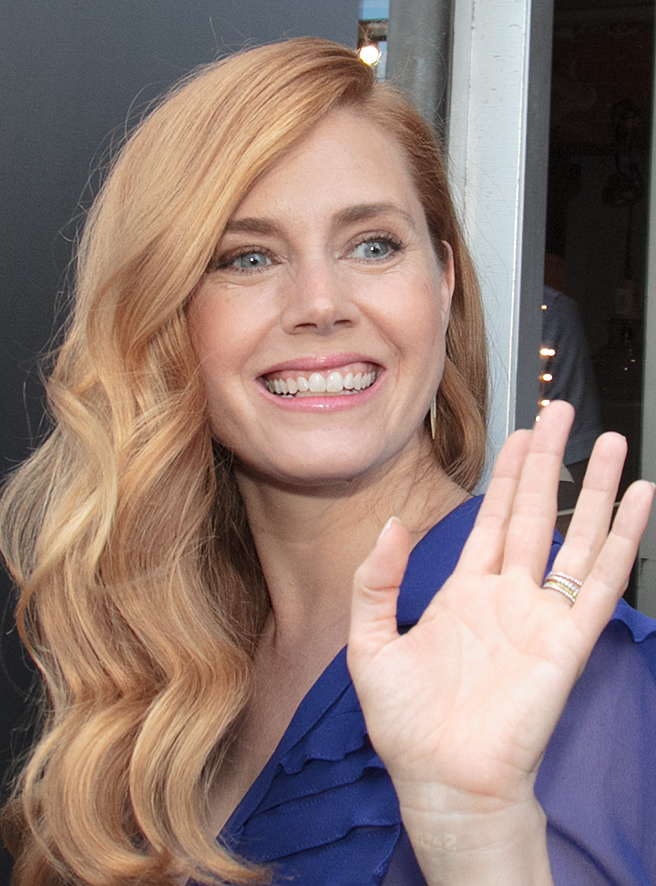
- Adams in 2016
Awards and nominations
| Award | Wins | Nominations |
| Academy Awards | 0 | 6 |
| Actor Awards | 1 | 10 |
| BAFTA Awards | 0 | 7 |
| Critics' Choice Awards | 5 | 12 |
| Emmy Awards | 0 | 2 |
| Golden Globe Awards | 2 | 10 |

Totals (Note: Certain award groups do not simply award one winner. They acknowledge several different recipients, have runners-up, and have third place. Since this is a specific recognition and is different from losing an award, runner-up mentions are considered wins in this award tally. For simplification and to avoid errors, each award in this list has been presumed to have had a prior nomination.)
- Wins: 37
- Nominations: 135

Amy Adams is an American actress who has received various awards and nominations, including two Golden Globe Awards, four Critics' Choice Movie Awards, and an Actor Award. Additionally, she has been nominated for six Academy Awards and seven British Academy Film Awards. In 2017, Adams received a star on the Hollywood Walk of Fame for her contributions to the motion picture industry.

Adams's breakthrough role in the 2005 acclaimed independent comedy-drama Junebug earned her an Academy Award nomination for Best Supporting Actress, and won her the Critics' Choice Movie Award for Best Supporting Actress and the Independent Spirit Award for Best Supporting Actress. In 2007, she starred in Walt Disney Pictures' romantic musical Enchanted, for which she won the Saturn Award for Best Actress and was nominated for the Golden Globe Award for Best Actress – Motion Picture Comedy or Musical, the Critics' Choice Award for Best Actress, and three MTV Movie Awards. Adams's performances in the critically acclaimed dramas Doubt (2008), The Fighter (2010), and The Master (2012) garnered her several accolades, including nominations from the Oscar, Golden Globes, BAFTA, Actor Award, and Critics' Choice Awards.

Since 2013, Adams has received two People's Choice and four Teen Choice Awards nominations for her role as Lois Lane in the DC Extended Universe. For her performance as a con artist in the 2013 crime comedy-drama American Hustle, Adams won the Golden Globe Award for Best Actress – Motion Picture Comedy or Musical and the Critics' Choice Movie Award for Best Actress in a Comedy, and received her first Academy Award for Best Actress nomination. The following year, she starred as Margaret Keane in the autobiographical drama Big Eyes, which won her a second consecutive Golden Globe Award for Best Actress – Motion Picture Comedy or Musical, making her the fourth actress to achieve this feat. (Note: The three previous actresses to have done so are: Rosalind Russell, Julie Andrews, and Kathleen Turner.) She also received her second nomination for the BAFTA Award for Best Actress in a Leading Role for her portrayal. In 2016, Adams won the National Board of Review Award for Best Actress, and was nominated for the Golden Globe Award, the SAG Award, the BAFTA Award, and the Critic's Choice Award for Best Actress, for playing a linguist in the science fiction film Arrival.

== Major associations ==
=== Academy Awards ===
The Academy Awards are a set of awards given by the Academy of Motion Picture Arts and Sciences annually for excellence of cinematic achievements. Adams has received six nominations, tying her with Deborah Kerr and Thelma Ritter as the actresses with the second most nominations without winning (surpassed only by Glenn Close, who has eight nominations).

| Year | Category | Nominated work | Result | Ref. |
|---|---|---|---|---|
| 2006 | Best Supporting Actress | Junebug | Nominated | |
| 2009 | Best Supporting Actress | Doubt | Nominated | |
| 2011 | Best Supporting Actress | The Fighter | Nominated | |
| 2013 | Best Supporting Actress | The Master | Nominated | |
| 2014 | Best Actress | American Hustle | Nominated | |
| 2019 | Best Supporting Actress | Vice | Nominated | |

=== Actor Awards ===
The Actor Awards are organized by the Screen Actors Guild‐American Federation of Television and Radio Artists. First awarded in 1995, the awards aim to recognize excellent achievements in film and television.

| Year | Category | Nominated work | Result | Ref. |
|---|---|---|---|---|
| 2006 | Outstanding Female Actor in a Supporting Role | Junebug | Nominated | |
| 2009 | Outstanding Female Actor in a Supporting Role | Doubt | Nominated | |
| 2009 | Outstanding Cast in a Motion Picture | Doubt | Nominated (Note: Shared with the cast of that respective film.) | |
| 2011 | Outstanding Female Actor in a Supporting Role | The Fighter | Nominated | |
| 2011 | Outstanding Cast in a Motion Picture | The Fighter | Nominated | |
| 2014 | Outstanding Cast in a Motion Picture | American Hustle | Won | |
| 2017 | Outstanding Female Actor in a Leading Role | Arrival | Nominated | |
| 2019 | Outstanding Female Actor in a Supporting Role | Vice | Nominated | |
| 2019 | Outstanding Female Actor in a Miniseries or Television Movie | Sharp Objects | Nominated | |
| 2021 | Outstanding Female Actor in a Leading Role | Hillbilly Elegy | Nominated | |

=== BAFTA Awards ===
The British Academy Film Award is an annual award show presented by the British Academy of Film and Television Arts.

| Year | Category | Nominated work | Result | Ref. |
British Academy Film Awards
| 2009 | Best Actress in a Supporting Role | Doubt | Nominated | |
| 2011 | Best Actress in a Supporting Role | The Fighter | Nominated | |
| 2013 | Best Actress in a Supporting Role | The Master | Nominated | |
| 2014 | Best Actress in a Leading Role | American Hustle | Nominated | |
| 2015 | Best Actress in a Leading Role | Big Eyes | Nominated | |
| 2017 | Best Actress in a Leading Role | Arrival | Nominated | |
| 2019 | Best Actress in a Supporting Role | Vice | Nominated | |

=== Emmy Awards ===
The Primetime Emmy Awards are presented annually by the Academy of Television Arts & Sciences which honors achievements in the television industry.

| Year | Category | Nominated work | Result | Ref. |
Primetime Emmy Awards
| 2019 | Outstanding Limited Series (Note: As executive producer) | Sharp Objects | Nominated | |
| 2019 | Outstanding Lead Actress in a Limited Series or Movie | Sharp Objects | Nominated | |

=== Golden Globe Awards ===
The Golden Globe Award is an accolade bestowed by the 93 members of the Hollywood Foreign Press Association (HFPA) recognizing excellence in film and television.

| Year | Category | Nominated work | Result | Ref. |
|---|---|---|---|---|
| 2008 | Best Actress in a Motion Picture – Musical or Comedy | Enchanted | Nominated | |
| 2009 | Best Supporting Actress – Motion Picture | Doubt | Nominated | |
| 2011 | Best Supporting Actress – Motion Picture | The Fighter | Nominated | |
| 2013 | Best Supporting Actress – Motion Picture | The Master | Nominated | |
| 2014 | Best Actress in a Motion Picture – Musical or Comedy | American Hustle | Won | |
| 2015 | Best Actress in a Motion Picture – Musical or Comedy | Big Eyes | Won | |
| 2017 | Best Actress in a Motion Picture – Drama | Arrival | Nominated | |
| 2019 | Best Actress – Miniseries or Television Film | Sharp Objects | Nominated | |
| 2019 | Best Supporting Actress – Motion Picture | Vice | Nominated | |
| 2024 | Best Actress in a Motion Picture – Musical or Comedy | Nightbitch | Nominated | |

== Miscellaneous accolades ==
=== AACTA International Awards ===
The Australian Academy of Cinema and Television Arts Awards are presented annually by the Australian Academy of Cinema and Television Arts (AACTA) to recognize and honor achievements in the film and television industry.

| Year | Category | Nominated work | Result | Ref. |
|---|---|---|---|---|
| 2013 | Best Actress | American Hustle | Nominated | |
| 2016 | Best Actress | Arrival | Nominated | |
| 2018 | Best Supporting Actress | Vice | Nominated | |

=== Capri Hollywood International Film Festival ===
The Capri Hollywood International Film Festival is an annual international film festival held every late December or early January in Capri, Italy.

| Year | Category | Nominated work | Result | Ref. |
|---|---|---|---|---|
| 2014 | Best Actress | Big Eyes | Won (Note: Tied with Jennifer Aniston for Cake) | |
| 2018 | Best Supporting Actress | Vice | Won | |

=== Critics' Choice Movie Awards ===
The Critics' Choice Movie Awards are presented annually since 1995 by the Broadcast Film Critics Association for outstanding achievements in the cinema industry.

| Year | Category | Nominated work | Result | Ref. |
|---|---|---|---|---|
| 2006 | Best Supporting Actress | Junebug | Won | |
| 2008 | Best Actress | Enchanted | Nominated | |
| 2009 | Best Acting Ensemble | Doubt | Nominated | |
| 2011 | Best Supporting Actress | The Fighter | Nominated | |
| 2011 | Best Acting Ensemble | The Fighter | Won | |
| 2013 | Best Supporting Actress | The Master | Nominated | |
| 2014 | Best Actress in a Comedy | American Hustle | Won | |
| 2014 | Best Acting Ensemble | American Hustle | Won | |
| 2017 | Best Actress | Arrival | Nominated | |
| 2019 | Best Supporting Actress | Vice | Nominated | |
| 2019 | Best Acting Ensemble | Vice | Nominated | |

=== Critics' Choice Television Awards ===
The Critics' Choice Television Awards are presented annually since 2011 by the Broadcast Television Journalists Association. The awards were launched "to enhance access for broadcast journalists covering the television industry".

| Year | Category | Nominated work | Result | Ref. |
|---|---|---|---|---|
| 2018 | Best Actress in a Movie/Miniseries | Sharp Objects | Won (Note: Tied with Patricia Arquette for Escape at Dannemora) | |

=== Dorian Awards ===
The Dorian Awards are organized by the Gay and Lesbian Entertainment Critics Association (GALECA).

| Year | Category | Nominated work | Result | Ref. |
|---|---|---|---|---|
| 2019 | TV Performance of the Year – Actress | Sharp Objects | Nominated | |

=== Empire Awards ===
The Empire Awards is a British awards ceremony held annually to recognize cinematic achievements.

| Year | Category | Nominated work | Result | Ref. |
|---|---|---|---|---|
| 2013 | Best Actress | American Hustle | Nominated | |
| 2016 | Best Actress | Arrival | Nominated | |

=== Golden Raspberry Awards ===
The Golden Raspberry Awards is a parody awards show honoring the worst of cinematic under-achievements.

| Year | Category | Nominated work | Result | Ref. |
|---|---|---|---|---|
| 2022 | Worst Actress | The Woman in the Window | Nominated | |
| 2022 | Worst Supporting Actress | Dear Evan Hansen | Nominated | |

=== Gotham Awards ===
Presented by the Independent Filmmaker Project, the Gotham Awards award the best in independent film.

| Year | Category | Nominated work | Result | Ref. |
|---|---|---|---|---|
| 2005 | Breakthrough Actor | Junebug | Won | |
| 2016 | Tribute Award | | Won | |

=== Hollywood Film Festival ===
The Hollywood Film Awards are held annually to recognize talent in the film industry.

| Year | Category | Nominated work | Result | Ref. |
|---|---|---|---|---|
| 2012 | Best Supporting Actress | The Master | Won | |

=== Independent Spirit Awards ===
The Independent Spirit Awards are presented annually by Film Independent, to award best in the independent film community.

| Year | Category | Nominated work | Result | Ref. |
|---|---|---|---|---|
| 2005 | Best Supporting Actress | Junebug | Won | |
| 2024 | Best Lead Performance | Nightbitch | Nominated | |

=== Irish Film & Television Awards ===
The Irish Film & Television Academy Awards are presented annually to award best in films and television.

| Year | Category | Nominated work | Result | Ref. |
|---|---|---|---|---|
| 2014 | Best International Actress | American Hustle | Nominated | |

=== MTV Movie Awards ===
The MTV Movie Awards is an annual award show presented by MTV to honor outstanding achievements in films. Founded in 1992, the winners of the awards are decided online by the audience.

| Year | Category | Nominated work | Result | Ref. |
|---|---|---|---|---|
| 2007 | Best Comedic Performance | Enchanted | Nominated | |
| 2007 | Best Female Performance | Enchanted | Nominated | |
| 2007 | Best Kiss | Enchanted | Nominated (Note: Shared with Patrick Dempsey) | |
| 2010 | Best Fight | The Fighter | Nominated | |
| 2013 | Best Female Performance | American Hustle | Nominated | |
| 2013 | Best On-Screen Duo | American Hustle | Nominated (Note: Shared with Christian Bale) | |
| 2013 | Best Kiss | American Hustle | Nominated (Note: Shared with Jennifer Lawrence) | |

=== Nickelodeon Kids' Choice Awards ===
The Nickelodeon Kids' Choice Awards, also known as the Kids Choice Awards (KCAs), is an annual awards show that airs on the Nickelodeon cable channel that honors the year's biggest television, film, and music acts, as voted by Nickelodeon viewers.

| Year | Category | Nominated work | Result | Ref. |
|---|---|---|---|---|
| 2011 | Favorite Movie Actress | The Muppets | Nominated | |
| 2017 | Favorite Movie Actress | Batman v Superman: Dawn of Justice | Nominated | |

=== Palm Springs International Film Festival ===
Founded in 1989 in Palm Springs, California, the Palm Springs International Film Festival is held annually in January.

| Year | Category | Nominated work | Result | Ref. |
|---|---|---|---|---|
| 2008 | Spotlight Award | Doubt | Won | |
| 2014 | Ensemble Cast Award | American Hustle | Won | |
| 2016 | Chairman's Award | Arrival | Won | |

=== People's Choice Awards ===
The People's Choice Awards is an American awards show recognizing the people and the work of popular culture. The show has been held annually since 1975, and is voted on by the general public.

| Year | Category | Nominated work | Result | Ref. |
|---|---|---|---|---|
| 2014 | Favorite Dramatic Movie Actress | Man of Steel | Nominated | |
| 2016 | Favorite Dramatic Movie Actress | Batman v Superman: Dawn of Justice | Nominated | |

=== Satellite Awards ===
The Satellite Awards are a set of annual awards given by the International Press Academy.

| Year | Category | Nominated work | Result | Ref. |
|---|---|---|---|---|
| 2005 | Best Supporting Actress – Motion Picture | Junebug | Nominated | |
| 2007 | Best Actress in a Motion Picture – Musical or Comedy | Enchanted | Nominated | |
| 2010 | Best Supporting Actress – Motion Picture | The Fighter | Nominated | |
| 2012 | Best Supporting Actress – Motion Picture | The Master | Nominated | |
| 2013 | Best Actress – Motion Picture | American Hustle | Nominated | |
| 2016 | Best Actress – Motion Picture | Nocturnal Animals | Nominated | |
| 2018 | Best Actress – Miniseries or Television Film | Sharp Objects | Won | |

=== Saturn Awards ===
The Saturn Awards are presented annually by the Academy of Science Fiction, Fantasy, and Horror Films to honor science fiction, fantasy, and horror films, television, and home video.

| Year | Category | Nominated work | Result | Ref. |
|---|---|---|---|---|
| 2008 | Best Actress | Enchanted | Won | |
| 2017 | Best Actress | Arrival | Nominated | |

=== Sundance Film Festival ===
The Sundance Film Festival is the largest film festival held annually in United States.

| Year | Category | Nominated work | Result | Ref. |
|---|---|---|---|---|
| 2005 | Special Jury Prize for Acting | Junebug | Won | |

=== Television Critics Association Awards ===
The TCA Awards are awards presented by the Television Critics Association in recognition of excellence in television.

| Year | Category | Nominated work | Result | Ref. |
|---|---|---|---|---|
| 2019 | Individual Achievement in Drama | Sharp Objects | Nominated | |

=== Teen Choice Awards ===
The Teen Choice Awards is an annual awards show that airs on the Fox Network. The awards honor the year's biggest achievements in music, movies, sports, television, fashion, and other categories, voted by teen viewers.

| Year | Category | Nominated work | Result | Ref. |
|---|---|---|---|---|
| 2007 | Choice Movie Actress: Comedy | Enchanted | Nominated | |
| 2009 | Choice Movie Actress: Comedy | Night at the Museum: Battle of the Smithsonian | Nominated | |
| 2013 | Summer Movie Star: Female | Man of Steel | Nominated | |
| 2013 | Choice Movie: Liplock | Man of Steel | Nominated | |
| 2016 | Choice Movie: Liplock | Batman v Superman: Dawn of Justice | Nominated | |
| 2016 | Choice Movie Actress – Sci-Fi/Fantasy | Batman v Superman: Dawn of Justice | Nominated | |
| 2017 | Choice Movie Actress – Sci-Fi/Fantasy | Arrival | Nominated | |

== Other awards ==
This is to include awards which are not related to any particular movie or project.

| Year | Award Name | Given By | Awarded For | Ref. |
|---|---|---|---|---|
| 2017 | American Cinematheque Award | American Cinematheque | Significant contribution to the art of the motion pictures | |
| 2018 | Giving Tree Award | Baby2Baby Organisation | Aiding low-income children | |

== Critics associations ==
| Year | Association | Category | Nominated work | Result | Ref. |
|---|---|---|---|---|---|
| 2005 | Florida Film Critics Circle | Best Supporting Actress | Junebug | Won | |
| 2005 | National Society of Film Critics | Best Supporting Actress | Junebug | Won | |
| 2005 | New York Film Critics Online | Best Supporting Actress | Junebug | Won | |
| 2005 | San Francisco Film Critics Circle | Best Supporting Actress | Junebug | Won | |
| 2005 | Vancouver Film Critics Circle | Best Supporting Actress | Junebug | Won | |
| 2005 | Washington D. C. Area Film Critics Association | Best Supporting Actress | Junebug | Won | |
| 2005 | Dallas–Fort Worth Film Critics Association | Best Supporting Actress | Junebug | Nominated | |
| 2005 | Los Angeles Film Critics Association | Best Supporting Actress | Junebug | Nominated | |
| 2005 | Online Film Critics Society | Best Supporting Actress | Junebug | Nominated | |
| 2005 | Dublin Film Critics Circle | Breakthrough Award | Junebug | Nominated | |
| 2007 | Alliance of Women Film Journalists | Best Breakthrough Performance | Enchanted | Nominated | |
| 2007 | Detroit Film Critics Society | Best Actress | Enchanted | Nominated | |
| 2008 | Houston Film Critics Society | Best Cast | Doubt | Won | |
| 2008 | National Board of Review | Best Cast | Doubt | Won | |
| 2008 | Washington D. C. Area Film Critics Association | Best Ensemble | Doubt | Won | |
| 2008 | Chicago Film Critics Association | Best Supporting Actress | Doubt | Nominated | |
| 2008 | Detroit Film Critics Society | Best Supporting Actress | Doubt | Nominated | |
| 2008 | Online Film Critics Society | Best Supporting Actress | Doubt | Nominated | |
| 2010 | Alliance of Women Film Journalists | Best Supporting Actress | The Fighter | Nominated | |
| 2010 | Boston Society of Film Critics | Best Ensemble | The Fighter | Won | |
| 2010 | Detroit Film Critics Society | Best Supporting Actress | The Fighter | Won | |
| 2010 | Detroit Film Critics Society | Best Ensemble | The Fighter | Nominated | |
| 2010 | Chicago Film Critics Association | Best Supporting Actress | The Fighter | Nominated | |
| 2010 | National Society of Film Critics | Best Supporting Actress | The Fighter | Nominated | |
| 2010 | Online Film Critics Society | Best Supporting Actress | The Fighter | Nominated | |
| 2010 | San Diego Film Critics Society | Best Ensemble | The Fighter | Nominated | |
| 2010 | St. Louis Gateway Film Critics Association | Best Supporting Actress | The Fighter | Nominated | |
| 2010 | Toronto Film Critics Association | Best Supporting Actress | The Fighter | Nominated | |
| 2010 | Vancouver Film Critics Circle | Best Supporting Actress | The Fighter | Nominated | |
| 2010 | Washington D. C. Area Film Critics Association | Best Supporting Actress | The Fighter | Nominated | |
| 2010 | Washington D. C. Area Film Critics Association | Best Ensemble | The Fighter | Nominated | |
| 2010 | Las Vegas Film Critics Society | Best Supporting Actress | The Fighter | Won | |
| 2012 | Alliance of Women Film Journalists | Best Supporting Actress | The Master | Nominated | |
| 2012 | Chicago Film Critics Association | Best Supporting Actress | The Master | Won | |
| 2012 | Los Angeles Film Critics Association | Best Supporting Actress | The Master | Won | |
| 2012 | National Society of Film Critics | Best Supporting Actress | The Master | Won | |
| 2012 | Vancouver Film Critics Circle | Best Supporting Actress | The Master | Won | |
| 2012 | Dallas–Fort Worth Film Critics Association | Best Supporting Actress | The Master | Nominated | |
| 2012 | Detroit Film Critics Society | Best Supporting Actress | The Master | Nominated | |
| 2012 | Houston Film Critics Society | Best Supporting Actress | The Master | Nominated | |
| 2012 | Online Film Critics Society | Best Supporting Actress | The Master | Nominated | |
| 2012 | San Diego Film Critics Society | Best Supporting Actress | The Master | Nominated | |
| 2012 | St. Louis Gateway Film Critics Association | Best Supporting Actress | The Master | Nominated | |
| 2012 | Toronto Film Critics Association | Best Supporting Actress | The Master | Nominated | |
| 2012 | Washington D. C. Area Film Critics Association | Best Supporting Actress | The Master | Nominated | |
| 2013 | Alliance of Women Film Journalists | Best Ensemble Cast | American Hustle | Won | |
| 2013 | Detroit Film Critics Society | Best Ensemble | American Hustle | Won | |
| 2013 | New York Film Critics Online | Best Ensemble | American Hustle | Won | |
| 2013 | San Diego Film Critics Society | Best Cast | American Hustle | Won | |
| 2013 | Detroit Film Critics Society | Best Actress | American Hustle | Nominated | |
| 2013 | New York Film Critics Circle | Best Actress | American Hustle | Nominated | |
| 2013 | St. Louis Gateway Film Critics Association | Best Actress | American Hustle | Nominated | |
| 2013 | Washington D. C. Area Film Critics Association | Best Ensemble | American Hustle | Nominated | |
| 2016 | National Board of Review | Best Actress | Arrival | Won | |
| 2016 | Utah Film Critics Association Awards | Best Actress | Arrival | Won | |
| 2016 | Washington D. C. Area Film Critics Association | Best Actress | Arrival | Nominated | |
| 2016 | San Francisco Film Critics Circle | Best Actress | Arrival | Nominated | |
| 2016 | St. Louis Gateway Film Critics Association | Best Actress | Arrival | Nominated | |
| 2016 | Chicago Film Critics Association | Best Actress | Arrival | Nominated | |
| 2016 | Dallas–Fort Worth Film Critics Association | Best Actress | Arrival | Nominated | |
| 2016 | Austin Film Critics Association | Best Actress | Arrival | Nominated | |
| 2016 | Detroit Film Critics Society | Best Actress | Arrival | Nominated | |
| 2016 | Houston Film Critics Society | Best Actress | Arrival | Nominated | |
| 2016 | Vancouver Film Critics Circle | Best Actress | Arrival | Nominated | |
| 2016 | Alliance of Women Film Journalists | Best Actress | Arrival | Nominated | |
| 2016 | London Film Critics Circle | Actress of the Year | Arrival | Nominated | |
| 2016 | Online Film Critics Society | Best Actress | Arrival | Nominated | |
| 2018 | Kansas City Film Critics Circle | Best Supporting Actress | Vice | Won | |
| 2018 | Detroit Film Critics Society | Best Supporting Actress | Vice | Nominated | |
| 2018 | Dallas–Fort Worth Film Critics Association Awards | Best Supporting Actress | Vice | Nominated | |
| 2018 | Houston Film Critics Society Awards | Best Supporting Actress | Vice | Nominated | |
| 2018 | Denver Film Critics Society | Best Supporting Actress | Vice | Nominated | |
| 2018 | Los Angeles Online Film Critics Society | Best Supporting Actress | Vice | Nominated | |
| 2018 | Austin Film Critics Association | Best Supporting Actress | Vice | Nominated | |
| 2018 | Phoenix Critics Circle | Best Supporting Actress | Vice | Nominated | |
| 2018 | San Francisco Film Critics Circle Awards | Best Supporting Actress | Vice | Nominated | |
| 2018 | Georgia Film Critics Association | Best Supporting Actress | Vice | Nominated | |
| 2018 | St. Louis Gateway Film Critics Association | Best Supporting Actress | Vice | Nominated | |
| 2024 | Michigan Movie Critics Guild | Best Actress | Nightbitch | Nominated | |
| 2024 | San Diego Film Critics Society | Best Actress | Nightbitch | Runner-up | |
