= Junebug (film) =

- theatrical film poster
- Directed by: Phil Morrison
- Written by: Angus MacLachlan
- Produced by: Mindy Goldberg; Mike S. Ryan
- Starring: Embeth Davidtz; Amy Adams; Ben McKenzie; Celia Weston; Alessandro Nivola; Scott Wilson
- Cinematography: Peter Donahue
- Edited by: Joe Klotz
- Music by: Yo La Tengo
- Distributed by: Sony Pictures Classics
- Release dates: January 24, 2005 (Sundance); August 3, 2005 (United States)
- Running time: 106 minutes
- Country: United States
- Language: English
- Budget: $1 million
- Box office: $3.4 million

Junebug is a 2005 American independent Southern Gothic comedy-drama film directed by Phil Morrison from a script by Angus MacLachlan. The film stars Embeth Davidtz as Madeline, an opulent art dealer, who tries to win over her new husband George's unreceptive, middle-class, orthodox parents. Amy Adams, Ben McKenzie (in his film debut), Celia Weston, Alessandro Nivola, and Scott Wilson also star. Joe Klotz edited the film and Yo La Tengo composed the score.

The film premiered at the Sundance Film Festival on January 24, 2005, and was released in theaters in August 2005. It received positive reviews from critics, with Adams's breakthrough performance garnering particular recognition and nominations for Best Supporting Actress at the Academy Awards, Critics' Choice Awards, and Screen Actors Guild Awards. The film also earned three nominations at the 21st Independent Spirit Awards and two at the 15th Gotham Independent Film Awards, with Adams winning prizes at both.

== Plot ==
When art dealer Madeleine travels from Chicago to North Carolina to pursue a local, self-taught painter for her outsider art gallery, she is accompanied by her new husband, George, whose family lives in the area and she takes the opportunity to get acquainted with them. There is his mother Peg; his reserved, contemplative father Eugene; and his sullen, resentful, twenty-something brother Johnny, who, although married, still lives at home. He is studying for his General Educational Development certificate while working at Replacements, Ltd. as an order processor. Johnny is married to Ashley, who is pregnant. Relations between Johnny and Ashley are strained, but Ashley believes that a baby will solve their marital problems.

Madeleine and George stay in the expected baby's nursery, and Madeleine becomes friends with Ashley, who is very sweet and friendly, if somewhat naive and talkative. The family takes Madeleine to a church social, where George is asked to sing a hymn. Madeleine is not used to intense religious displays but makes no comment. She attends Ashley's baby shower and gives her sister-in-law an antique silver spoon, which stands out from the other gifts. Madeleine discovers that she does not know much about George, as they have been married only six months and had met just a week before their wedding.

Ashley goes into labor, and the family goes to the hospital with her. However, the artist Madeleine is pursuing is hesitant about signing with her gallery, so Madeleine leaves to meet with the artist and is able to convince him to sign with her gallery, which briefly makes George angry. Madeleine calls George to rave about the artist (she is impressed with his work, but shocked by his anti-Semitism) without asking about the baby. George interrupts her and informs her that Ashley's baby boy is stillborn, which causes Madeleine to double over with guilt. The artist and his sister drive Madeleine back to her in-laws' home, and she later sits with Eugene on the back porch and cries. Meanwhile, George supports Ashley at the hospital, who expresses that George is always there when Ashley needs him. George kisses Ashley on the forehead and leaves. George comes home and has a wordless encounter in the garage with his brother, Johnny, who throws a tool at him, injuring his forehead. George does nothing in response.

The next day, George and Madeleine prepare to leave. Johnny calls Ashley and suggests that they "try again", to which Ashley excitedly squeals. As George and Madeleine drive onto the highway and pick up speed, George remarks, "I'm so glad we're out of there" as Madeleine caresses George's neck with her left hand.

== Cast ==
- Embeth Davidtz as Madeleine Johnsten
- Amy Adams as Ashley Johnsten
- Ben McKenzie as Johnny Johnsten
- Celia Weston as Peg Johnsten
- Alessandro Nivola as George Johnsten
- Scott Wilson as Eugene Johnsten
- Frank Hoyt Taylor as David Wark, the artist
- Joanne Pankow as Sissy Wark, David's sister
- Alicia Van Couvering as Bernadette, Madeleine's gallery assistant
- Jill Wagner as Millicent, friend at baby shower

== Production ==
The film was shot on Super 16mm film stock.

== Reception ==
The film premiered at the 2005 Sundance Film Festival, where Adams won a Special Jury Prize for her performance. On review aggregator website Rotten Tomatoes, Junebug has an approval rating of 86% based on 135 reviews, and an average rating of 7.50/10. The website's critical consensus states, "Aided and abetted by a wonderful cast, director Phil Morrison transforms familiar material into an understated and resonant comedy". Metacritic assigned the film a weighted average score of 80 out of 100, based on 34 critics, indicating "generally favorable" reviews.

Roger Ebert gave the film four stars and praised it as "a movie that understands, profoundly and with love and sadness, the world of small towns; it captures ways of talking and living I remember from my childhood, with the complexity and precision of great fiction". Tim Robey of The Daily Telegraph labeled the film a "rare treat" and a "small, quiet miracle". There was particular praise for Amy Adams, who went on to earn her first of six Academy Award nominations.

== Music ==
The film's score is made up of original music by Yo La Tengo, as well as classical music by Haydn, Shostakovich, Schubert and Vivaldi. The film begins and ends with the 1977 song "Harmour Love" performed by Syreeta Wright and written by Stevie Wonder. During a scene where most of the characters are at a church social, George and two young men are featured singing the hymn "Softly and Tenderly, Jesus Is Calling" by Will Lamartine Thompson.

In 2008, Yo La Tengo released some of the original music in a compilation of their soundtrack work titled They Shoot, We Score.

== Home media ==
The DVD was released on January 17, 2006, by Sony Pictures Entertainment. The release includes deleted scenes, audio commentary with Embeth Davidtz and Amy Adams, behind-the-scenes featurettes, and casting sessions.

== Awards ==
Year	Award ceremony	Category	Nominee	Result
2006	Academy Awards	Best Supporting Actress	Amy Adams	Nominated
2006	Central Ohio Film Critics Association Awards	Breakthrough Film Artist	Amy Adams	Won
2006	Central Ohio Film Critics Association Awards	Best Supporting Actress	Amy Adams	runner up
2006	Critics' Choice Awards	Best Supporting Actress	Amy Adams	Won (Note: Tied with Michelle Williams for Brokeback Mountain)
2006	Independent Spirit Awards	Best Supporting Female	Amy Adams	Won
2006	Independent Spirit Awards	Best First Screenplay	Angus MacLachlan	Nominated
2006	Independent Spirit Awards	Piaget Producer Award	Mike S. Ryan	Nominated
2006	National Society of Film Critics Awards	Best Supporting Actress	Amy Adams	Won
2006	Online Film Critics Society Awards	Best Supporting Actress	Amy Adams	Nominated
2006	Screen Actors Guild Awards	Outstanding Performance by a Female Actor in a Supporting Role	Amy Adams	Nominated
2005	Gotham Independent Film Awards	Breakthrough Actor/Actress	Amy Adams	Won
2005	Gotham Independent Film Awards	Breakthrough Director	Phil Morrison	Nominated
2005	San Francisco Film Critics Circle	Best Supporting Actress	Amy Adams	Won
2005	Satellite Awards	Best Supporting Actress	Amy Adams	Nominated
2005	Southeastern Film Critics Association Awards	Best Supporting Actress	Amy Adams	Won
2005	Sundance Film Festival	Special Jury Prize for Acting	Amy Adams	Won
2005	Sundance Film Festival	Directing Award	Phil Morrison	Nominated
