= Amy Adams =

American actress (born 1974)

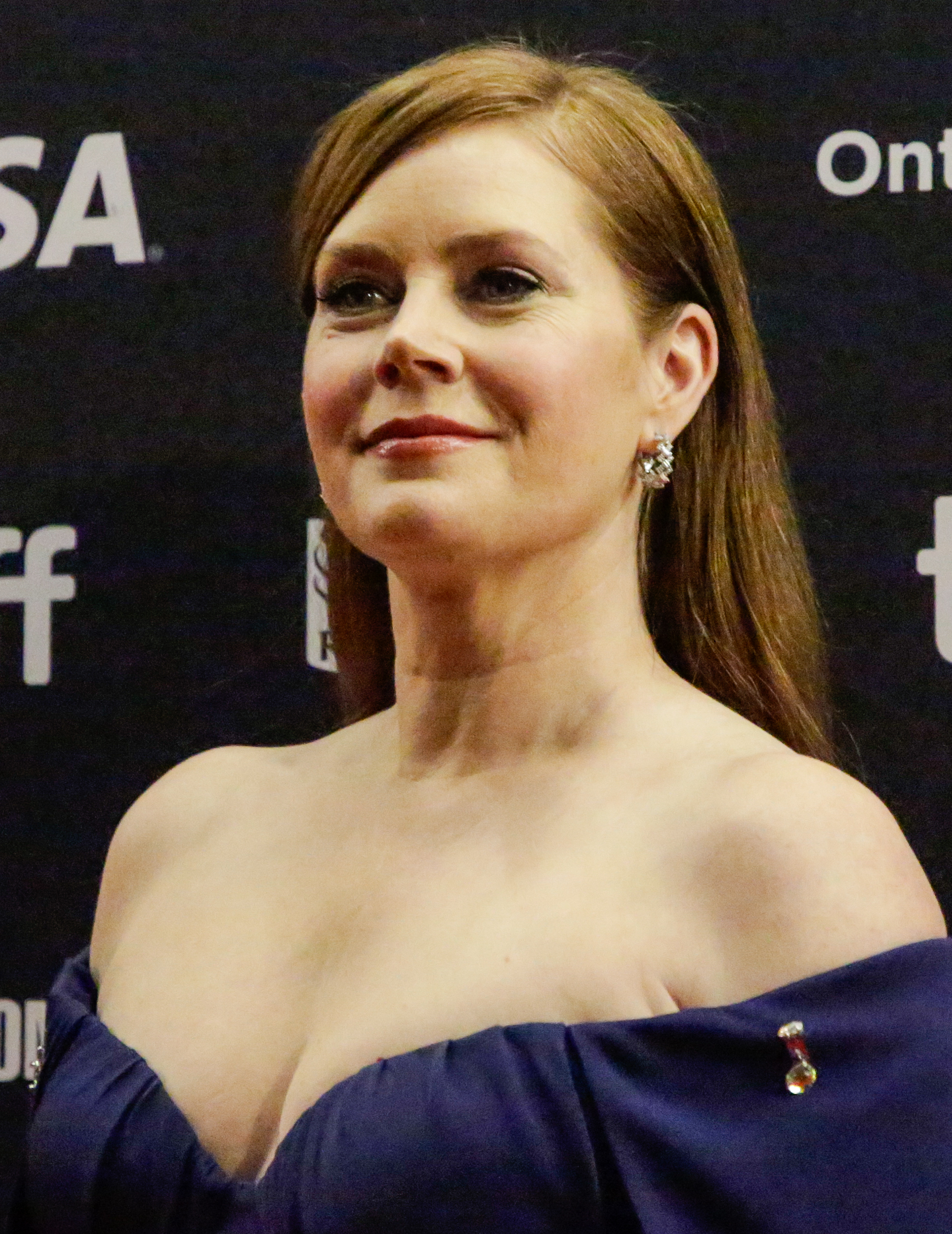
- Adams in 2024
- Born: Amy Lou Adams; August 20, 1974 (age 52); Aviano, Italy
- Citizenship: American
- Occupation: Actress
- Years active: 1994–present
- Works: Full list
- Spouse: Darren Le Gallo (m. 2015)
- Children: 1
- Awards: Full list

Amy Lou Adams (born August 20, 1974) is an American actress. Known for both her comedic and dramatic roles, she has been featured three times in annual rankings of the world's highest-paid actresses. She has received various accolades including two Golden Globes, and has been nominated for six Academy Awards, seven British Academy Film Awards, and two Primetime Emmy Awards.

Adams started her film career taking supporting roles in the dark comedy Drop Dead Gorgeous (1999) and Steven Spielberg's biopic Catch Me If You Can (2002) before her breakout role as a loquacious pregnant woman in the independent comedy-drama Junebug (2005), for which she received her first Academy Award nomination. She was further Oscar-nominated for her performances as an idealistic nun in the drama Doubt (2008), a feisty boxer's girlfriend in the sports drama The Fighter (2010), a manipulative wife of a cult leader in psychological drama The Master (2012), a seductive con artist in the crime film American Hustle (2013), and Lynne Cheney in the political satire Vice (2018).

She portrayed a cheerful princess-to-be Giselle in the musical fantasy films Enchanted (2007) and Disenchanted (2020) as well as Lois Lane starting with Man of Steel (2013) in the DC Extended Universe until 2017. She is also known for starring in Julie & Julia (2009), Night at the Museum: Battle of the Smithsonian (2009), The Muppets (2011), Her (2013), Big Eyes (2014), Arrival (2016), and Nocturnal Animals (2016).

On television, she played a self-harming reporter in the HBO miniseries Sharp Objects (2018) for which she was nominated for a Primetime Emmy Award. On stage, Adams starred in a Public Theater revival of Into the Woods in 2012 and a West End revival of The Glass Menagerie in 2022. In 2014, she was named one of the 100 most influential people in the world by Time, and featured in the Forbes Celebrity 100 list.

== Early life ==
Amy Lou Adams was born on August 20, 1974, in Aviano, Friuli, Italy, to American parents Kathryn and Richard Adams, while her father served in the United States Army at the local air base. She is the middle child of seven, with four brothers and two sisters. After moving from one army base to another, the family settled in Castle Rock, Colorado when she was eight. After leaving the Army, her father sang professionally in nightclubs and restaurants.

Adams says that going to her father's shows and drinking Shirley Temples at a bar are among her fondest childhood memories. The family was poor; they camped, hiked together, and performed amateur skits written by her father or sometimes by her mother. She was enthusiastic about being in the plays and always played the lead.

Adams grew up Mormon until her parents divorced in 1985 and left the church. She did not have strong religious beliefs, but said that she values her upbringing for teaching her love and compassion. After the breakup, her father moved to Arizona and remarried, while the children remained with their mother. Her mother became a semi-professional bodybuilder who took the children with her to the gym when she trained. Adams has compared her uninhibited early years with her siblings to Lord of the Flies. She said that she was a "scrappy, tough kid" and fought frequently with other children.

Adams attended Douglas County High School in Castle Rock. She was not academically inclined, but was interested in the creative arts and sang in the school choir. She competed in track and gymnastics, harbored ambitions of becoming a ballerina, and trained as an apprentice at the local David Taylor Dance Company. She disliked high school keeping mostly to herself. After graduation she and her mother moved to Atlanta. She did not go to college, to her parents' disappointment and she later regretted not pursuing higher education. At 18, she realized she was not gifted enough to be a professional ballerina, and found musical theater to be more to her taste. One of her first stage roles was in a community theater production of Annie, which she did as a volunteer. Supporting herself, she worked as a greeter at a GAP store and as a waitress at Hooters, but left the job when she saved enough money to buy a used car.

== Career ==
=== 1994–2004: Dinner theater and early screen appearances ===
Adams began her professional career as a dancer in a 1994 dinner theater production of A Chorus Line in Boulder, Colorado. The job required her to wait on tables before getting up on stage to perform. She enjoyed singing and dancing, but disliked waitressing and ran into trouble when a fellow dancer, whom she considered a friend, made false accusations about her to the director. Adams said, "I never really knew what the lies were. I only knew I kept getting called in and lectured about my lack of professionalism." She lost the job but went on to perform in dinner theater at Denver's Heritage Square Music Hall and Country Dinner Playhouse. During a performance of Anything Goes at the Country Dinner Playhouse in 1995, she was spotted by Michael Brindisi, the president and artistic director of the Chanhassen, Minnesota-based Chanhassen Dinner Theatres, who offered her a job there. Adams moved to Chanhassen, where she performed in the theater for the next three years. She loved the "security and schedule" of the job, and has said that she learned tremendously from it. Nonetheless, the grueling work took its toll on her: "I had a lot of recurring injuries—bursitis in my knees, pulled muscles in my groin, my adductor and abductor. My body was wearing out."

During her time at Chanhassen, Adams acted in her first film—a black-and-white short satire named The Chromium Hook. Soon after, while she was off work nursing a pulled muscle, she attended the locally held auditions for the Hollywood film Drop Dead Gorgeous (1999), a satire on beauty pageants starring Kirsten Dunst, Ellen Barkin, and Kirstie Alley. Adams was cast in the supporting part of a promiscuous cheerleader. She felt that her character's personality was far removed from her own and worried about how people would perceive her. The production was filmed locally, which enabled Adams to shoot for her role while also performing Brigadoon on stage. Encouragement from Alley prompted Adams to actively pursue a film career, and she moved to Los Angeles in January 1999. She described her initial experience in the city as "dark" and "bleak", and she pined for her life back in Chanhassen.

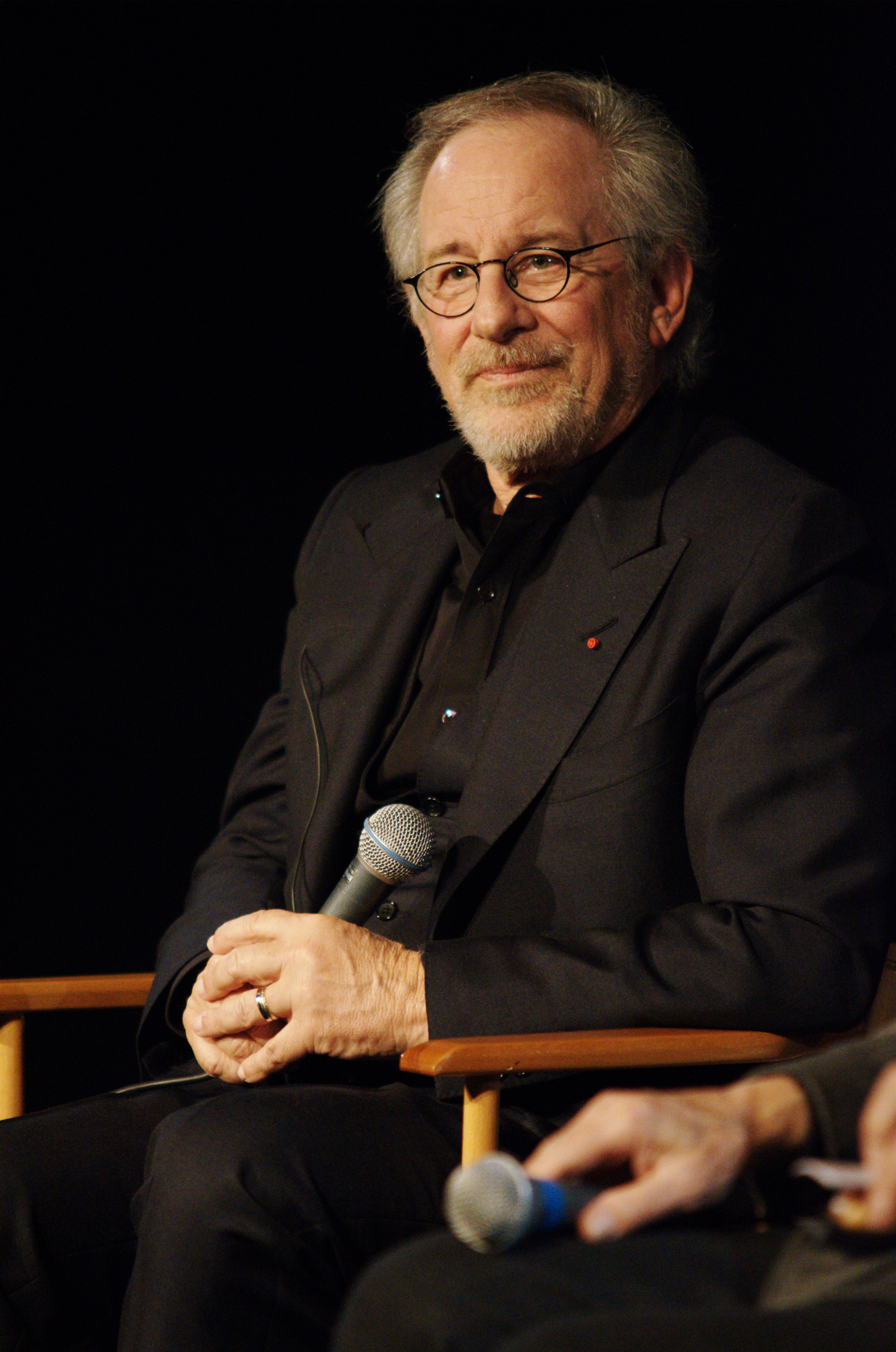
Steven Spielberg gave Adams her first major role in Catch Me If You Can.

In Los Angeles, Adams auditioned for whatever parts came her way, but she was mostly given roles of "the bitchy girl". Her first assignment came within a week of her relocation in the Fox television series Manchester Prep, a spin-off of the film Cruel Intentions, in the lead role of Kathryn Merteuil (played by Sarah Michelle Gellar in the film). After numerous script revisions and two production shutdowns, the series was canceled. Adams later said a controversial scene in which her character encourages a girl to masturbate on a horse was the primary reason for its cancellation. The three filmed episodes were re-edited and released later in 2000 as the direct-to-video film Cruel Intentions 2. Despite a negative critical reception, Nathan Rabin of The A.V. Club wrote that Adams played her "alpha-bitch role with vicious glee largely missing from Sarah Michelle Gellar's sterile take on the character".

Adams next had a supporting role as the teenage nemesis of a movie star (played by Kimberly Davies) in Psycho Beach Party (2000), a horror parody of beach party and slasher films. She played the part as a homage to actress Ann-Margret. From 2000 to 2002, Adams appeared in guest roles in several television series, including That '70s Show, Charmed, Buffy the Vampire Slayer, Smallville, and The West Wing.

After brief roles in three small-scale features of 2002—The Slaughter Rule, Pumpkin, and Serving Sara—Adams got her first major role in Steven Spielberg's comedy-drama Catch Me If You Can. She played Brenda Strong, a nurse with whom Frank Abagnale Jr. (played by Leonardo DiCaprio) falls in love. Despite the film's success and praise for her "warm presence" from Variety critic Todd McCarthy, it failed to boost her career. She was unemployed for a year after its release, leading her to almost quit film acting. Spielberg was surprised that she did not break through soon after the film's release. Adams instead enrolled in acting classes, realizing that she had "a lot to learn and a lot of self-growth to work through". Her career prospects seemingly improved a year later when she received a lucrative offer to star as a regular in the CBS television drama Dr. Vegas, but she was dropped after a few episodes. In film, she only had a minor role in the Fred Savage-starring The Last Run (2004).

=== 2005–2007: Breakthrough with Junebug and Enchanted ===
Disillusioned by her firing from Dr. Vegas, thirty-year-old Adams considered quitting acting altogether after completing work on the independent comedy-drama Junebug, which had a production budget of under $1 million. Directed by Phil Morrison, the film featured her as Ashley Johnsten, a perky and talkative pregnant woman. Morrison was impressed with Adams's ability to not question her character's inherently good motives. She connected with Johnsten's faith in God and spent time with Morrison in Winston-Salem, North Carolina, where the film is set, attending church. She described making the film as "the summer I grew into myself", and after dyeing her hair red for the role, she decided not to go back to her natural blonde color. Junebug premiered at the 2005 Sundance Film Festival, where Adams won a special jury prize. Tim Robey of The Daily Telegraph labeled the film a "small, quiet miracle" and wrote that Adams had given "one of the most delicately funny and heartbreaking performances it's ever been my pleasure to review". Ann Hornaday of The Washington Post opined that her "radiant portrayal" reflected the film's "deeply humanist heart". For her performance, Adams won the Independent Spirit Award for Best Supporting Female and Critics' Choice Award for Best Supporting Actress, and received her first Oscar nomination (Best Supporting Actress).

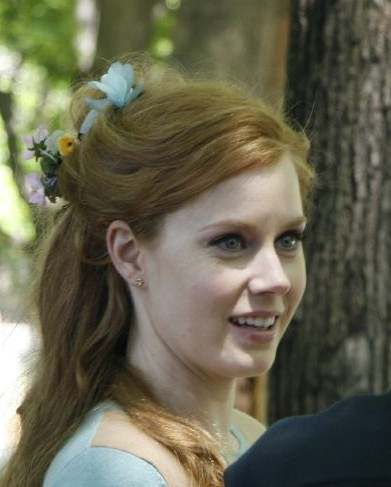
Adams on the set of Enchanted in 2006, her breakout film

Later in 2005, Adams had supporting parts in two critically panned films—the romantic comedy The Wedding Date, starring Debra Messing and Dermot Mulroney, and the ensemble coming-of-age film Standing Still. Also that year, she joined the cast of the television series The Office, for the recurring role of Jim's girlfriend Katy over three episodes. In Talladega Nights: The Ballad of Ricky Bobby (2006), a sports comedy from Adam McKay, Adams played the romantic interest of Will Ferrell's character, a role which critic Peter Travers deemed "quite a comedown" from her part in Junebug. She also had a minor role in the workplace comedy The Ex, starring Zach Braff and Amanda Peet.

After voicing in Walt Disney Pictures' animated comedy film Underdog (2007), Adams starred as a highly optimistic and joyous character named Giselle, who is based on members of the Disney Princess franchise, in the musical romantic comedy Enchanted. Patrick Dempsey and James Marsden co-starred as her romantic interests. She was among 250 actresses who auditioned for the high-profile role; the studio had favored the casting of a bigger star, but the director Kevin Lima insisted on Adams due to her commitment to the part and her ability to be non-judgmental about Giselle's personality. A ball gown she had to wear for the film weighed 45 pounds (20 kg), and she fell several times under its weight. She sang three songs for the film's soundtrack—"True Love's Kiss", "Happy Working Song", and "That's How You Know". The critic Roger Ebert commended Adams for being "fresh and winning" in a role that "absolutely depends on effortless lovability", and Wesley Morris of The Boston Globe credited her for "demonstrat[ing] a real performer's ingenuity for comic timing and physical eloquence". Todd McCarthy considered it to be her breakthrough role and likened her rise to stardom to that of Julie Andrews. Enchanted was a commercial success, grossing over $340 million worldwide, and Adams was nominated for the Golden Globe Award for Best Actress – Motion Picture Comedy or Musical.

After the success of Enchanted, Adams took on the part of Bonnie Bach, Congressman Charlie Wilson's assistant in Mike Nichols' political comedy-drama Charlie Wilson's War (2007), starring Tom Hanks, Julia Roberts, and Philip Seymour Hoffman. Kirk Honeycutt of The Hollywood Reporter credited Adams for being "sweetly savvy" in her part, while Peter Bradshaw of The Guardian was disappointed to see her talent wasted in a role he considered to be of minimal importance.

=== 2008–2012: Ingénue parts and expansion to dramatic roles ===
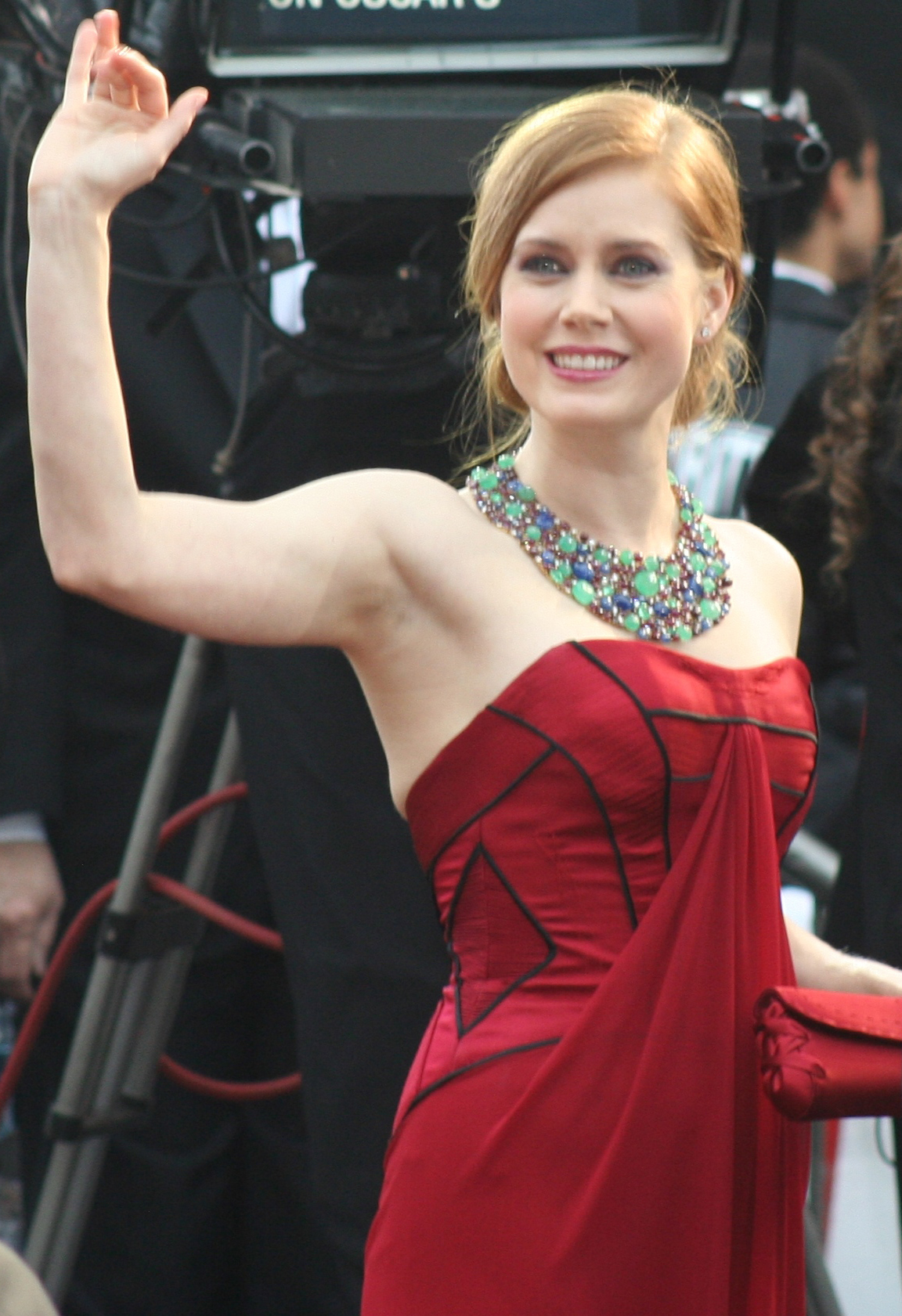
Adams at the 81st Academy Awards in 2009, where she received her second Academy Award nomination for Doubt (2008)

The 2008 Sundance Film Festival saw the release of Sunshine Cleaning, a comedy-drama about two sisters (played by Adams and Emily Blunt) who start a crime scene clean-up business. Adams was drawn to the idea of playing someone who constantly tries to better herself. Mick LaSalle of the San Francisco Chronicle found Adams to be "magical", adding that she "gives us a portrait of raging want beneath a veneer of surface diffidence". In the 1939-set screwball comedy Miss Pettigrew Lives for a Day, Adams starred as an aspiring American actress in London who encounters a middle-aged governess named Miss Pettigrew (played by Frances McDormand). Stephen Holden of The New York Times drew similarities to her role in Enchanted and wrote that the "screen magic" she displays in such endearing roles "hasn't been this intense since the heyday of Jean Arthur".

Adams next starred in Doubt, an adaptation of John Patrick Shanley's play of the same name. The film tells the story of a Catholic school principal (played by Meryl Streep) who accuses a priest, played by Philip Seymour Hoffman, of pedophilia; she played an innocent nun embroiled in the conflict. Shanley initially approached Natalie Portman for the part, but offered Adams the role after finding her innocent, yet intelligent, personality similar to that of Ingrid Bergman. She identified with her character's ability to find the best in people, and described her collaboration with Streep and Hoffman as a "master class" in acting. Amy Biancolli of the Houston Chronicle wrote that Adams "sparks with distressed compassion", and Ann Hornaday believed that she "exudes just the right wide-eyed innocence". She was nominated for the Academy Award, Golden Globe Award, and BAFTA Award.

As with Junebug and Enchanted, Adams's roles in her three 2008 releases were those of the ingénue—innocent women with a cheerful personality. When asked about being typecast in such roles, she said she responds to characters who are joyful and identified with their sense of hope. She believed that despite certain similarities in their disposition, these characters were vastly different from one another; she stated, "Naïveté is not stupidity, and innocent people are often very complex."

The 2009 fantasy adventure film Night at the Museum: Battle of the Smithsonian, starring Ben Stiller, Robin Williams and Owen Wilson, featured Adams as the aviator Amelia Earhart. It was the first motion picture to film inside the National Air and Space Museum in Washington. The director Shawn Levy said the role allowed Adams to showcase her acting range; the actress believed it to be the first time she was allowed to play a confident character on screen. Despite mixed reviews, Adams's performance was praised. Terming her a "sparkling screen presence", Michael Phillips of the Chicago Tribune wrote that the film "radically improves whenever Amy Adams pops up". That same year, Adams starred in the comedy-drama Julie & Julia as disgruntled government secretary Julie Powell who decides to blog about the recipes in Simone Beck, Louisette Bertholle and Julia Child's cookbook Mastering the Art of French Cooking; in a parallel storyline, Meryl Streep portrays Child. She enrolled at the Institute of Culinary Education to prepare for the part. Carrie Rickey of The Philadelphia Inquirer thought the film was "as delicious as French cuisine" and found Adams to be "at her most winsome". Both Night at the Museum and Julie & Julia were commercial successes, with the former grossing $413 million.

Adams began the new decade with a leading role opposite Matthew Goode in the romantic comedy Leap Year (2010), which critic Richard Roeper believed was saved from "truly awful status" by Adams's presence. Her next release of the year—the boxing drama The Fighter—was much better received. Directed by David O. Russell, the film tells the story of boxer half-brothers Micky Ward and Dicky Eklund (played by Mark Wahlberg and Christian Bale, respectively); Melissa Leo played their mother and Adams played Ward's aggressive barmaid girlfriend named Charlene Fleming. Describing her character as a "tough, sexy bitch", Russell cast Adams against type to rid her of her girl-next-door image. The role marked a significant departure for her, and she was challenged by Russell's insistence on finding her character's strength in silence. She enrolled in an exotic dance class by trainer Sheila Kelley to find her character's eroticism. Joe Morgenstern of The Wall Street Journal found Adams to be "as tough, tender, smart, and funny as she was ethereal and delightful in Enchanted. What an actress, and what range!" She received Academy Award, Golden Globe, and BAFTA nominations; she lost the former two to Leo. She expressed a desire to play more dramatic roles in the future.

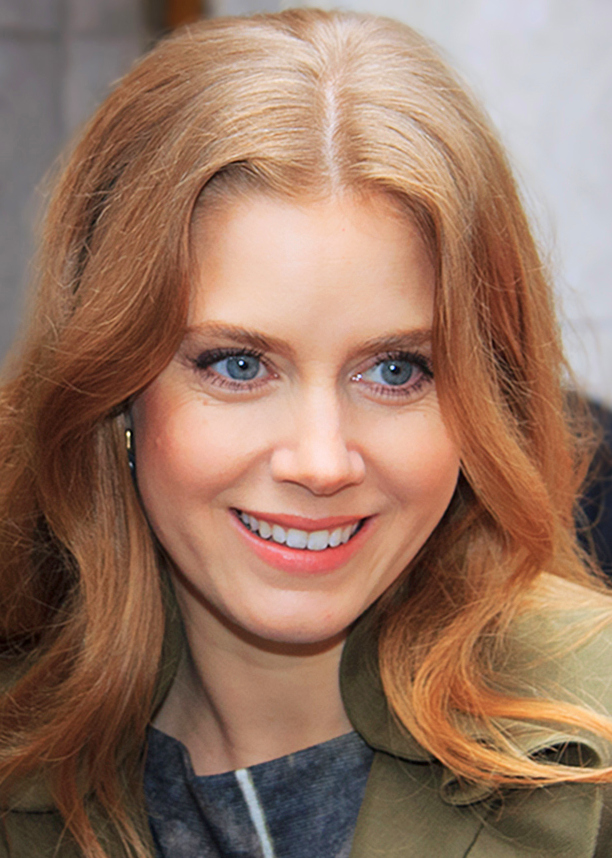
Adams promoting The Master at the 2012 Toronto International Film Festival

The Disney musical The Muppets (2011) starring the eponymous puppets featured Adams and Jason Segel in live-action roles. She sang seven songs for the film's soundtrack. Lisa Schwarzbaum of Entertainment Weekly noted that the role marked her return to her "comedian-sweetheart" persona. The following year, Adams played the Baker's Wife in the Public Theater's revival of Stephen Sondheim's musical Into the Woods, as part of the Shakespeare in the Park festival at the open-air Delacorte Theater. It was her New York stage debut and her first theater appearance in 13 years. She agreed to the month-long production to "take on a challenge that seemed insurmountable", though she was overwhelmed and intimidated by it. She prepared with a private singing coach, but her film schedule enabled her to spend only four weeks in rehearsal. Ben Brantley of The New York Times praised Adams's "lucidly spoken and sung performance" but criticized her for lacking the "nervy, dissatisfied restlessness" of her part.

Adams took another "fierce woman" part in Paul Thomas Anderson's psychological drama The Master (2012). She played Peggy Dodd, the ruthless and manipulative wife of a cult leader (played by Philip Seymour Hoffman). It marked her third and final collaboration with Hoffman, whom she deeply admired, before his death two years later. The organization depicted in the film was deemed by journalists to be based on Scientology; Adams considered the comparison to be misleading but was glad for the attention it brought to the film. Although not a method actor, she believed the intense role had left her on edge in her personal life. Comparing her character to Lady Macbeth, the critic Justin Chang wrote that Adams's "pertness has rarely seemed so malevolent", and Donald Clarke of The Irish Times commended her for playing the part with "discrete menace". John Patterson of The Guardian remarked that a scene in which her character chastises her husband while furiously masturbating him was one of the most significant sequences in the film. Once again, Adams received Academy Award, Golden Globe, and BAFTA nominations for her performance.

Clint Eastwood's sports drama Trouble with the Curve, in which she played the estranged daughter of a baseball scout (Eastwood), was Adams's second film release of 2012. She admired Eastwood's "warm and generous" personality and was pleased with the collaboration. She prepared for the part by learning to catch, pitch, and swing from a baseball coach. The film received mixed reviews, and Roger Ebert took note of how Adams had made a standard role seem valuable. She also played the brief part of a drug addict in On the Road, an ensemble drama based on Jack Kerouac's novel of the same name.

=== 2013–2019: Established actress ===
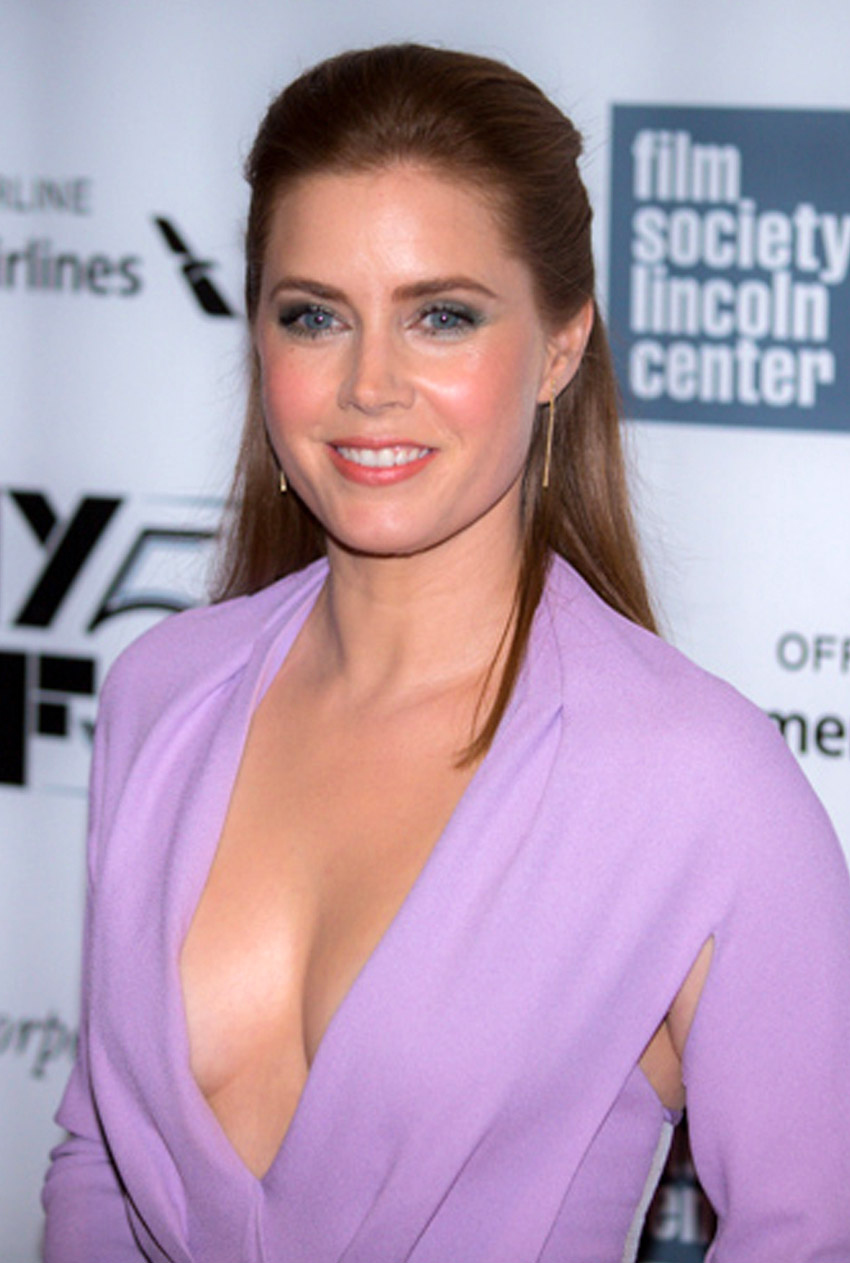
Adams attending the premiere of Her at the 2013 New York Film Festival

After losing out on the role of Lois Lane in two previous films about Superman, Adams secured the part in Zack Snyder's 2013 reboot, Man of Steel, starring Henry Cavill as the titular superhero. She played Lane with a mixture of toughness and vulnerability, but Peter Bradshaw found the character "sketchily conceived" and criticized the actress' lack of chemistry with Cavill. The film grossed $670 million to become one of her biggest box-office hits. Adams next featured in Her, a drama from writer-director Spike Jonze about a lonely man (Joaquin Phoenix) who falls in love with an artificial intelligence (voiced by Scarlett Johansson); she played his close friend. The actress had unsuccessfully auditioned for Jonze's 2009 film Where the Wild Things Are and was cast in Her after Jonze looked back at those tapes. She was drawn to the idea of portraying a platonic male-female friendship, which she believed was rare in film.

Further success came to Adams when she reteamed with David O. Russell in the black comedy crime film American Hustle, co-starring Christian Bale, Bradley Cooper, and Jennifer Lawrence. Inspired by the 1970s Abscam scandal, the film featured her as a seductive con artist, though she played it so that "everything felt justified and it didn't feel like she was just a sexy sociopath". She collaborated closely with Bale to build their characters and made off-screen suggestions to Russell, including for a scene in which she is aggressively kissed on the lips by her lover's wife (played by Lawrence). The work proved grueling for Adams, who later confirmed reports that Russell had been hard on her and made her cry frequently; she said she feared bringing such a negative experience home to her daughter. American Hustle was critically acclaimed; Manohla Dargis of The New York Times believed Adams "goes deeper here than she's ever been allowed to", adding that she had successfully "turn[ed] an unpredictable character into a thrillingly wild one". She won the Golden Globe Award for Best Actress in a Comedy or Musical and received her fifth Academy Award nomination (her first for Best Actress). Her and American Hustle were both named by critics as being among the best films of 2013, and were both nominated for the Academy Award for Best Picture.

After an appearance in the poorly received drama Lullaby, Adams starred in Big Eyes (2014), a biopic of the troubled artist Margaret Keane, whose paintings of "big-eyed waifs" were plagiarized by her husband Walter Keane. When she was first offered the part, she passed on it to avoid playing another naïve woman. The birth of her daughter in 2010 prompted Adams to find strength in the passive character, and she drew on real-life experiences where she had not stood up for herself. In preparation, she practiced painting and studied the way Keane worked. Keane liked Adams's portrayal of her, and Mark Kermode of The Observer termed her performance a "potent blend of intuitive fire and sensitive vulnerability". She won a second consecutive Golden Globe Award for Best Actress in a Motion Picture – Musical or Comedy and received a BAFTA nomination.

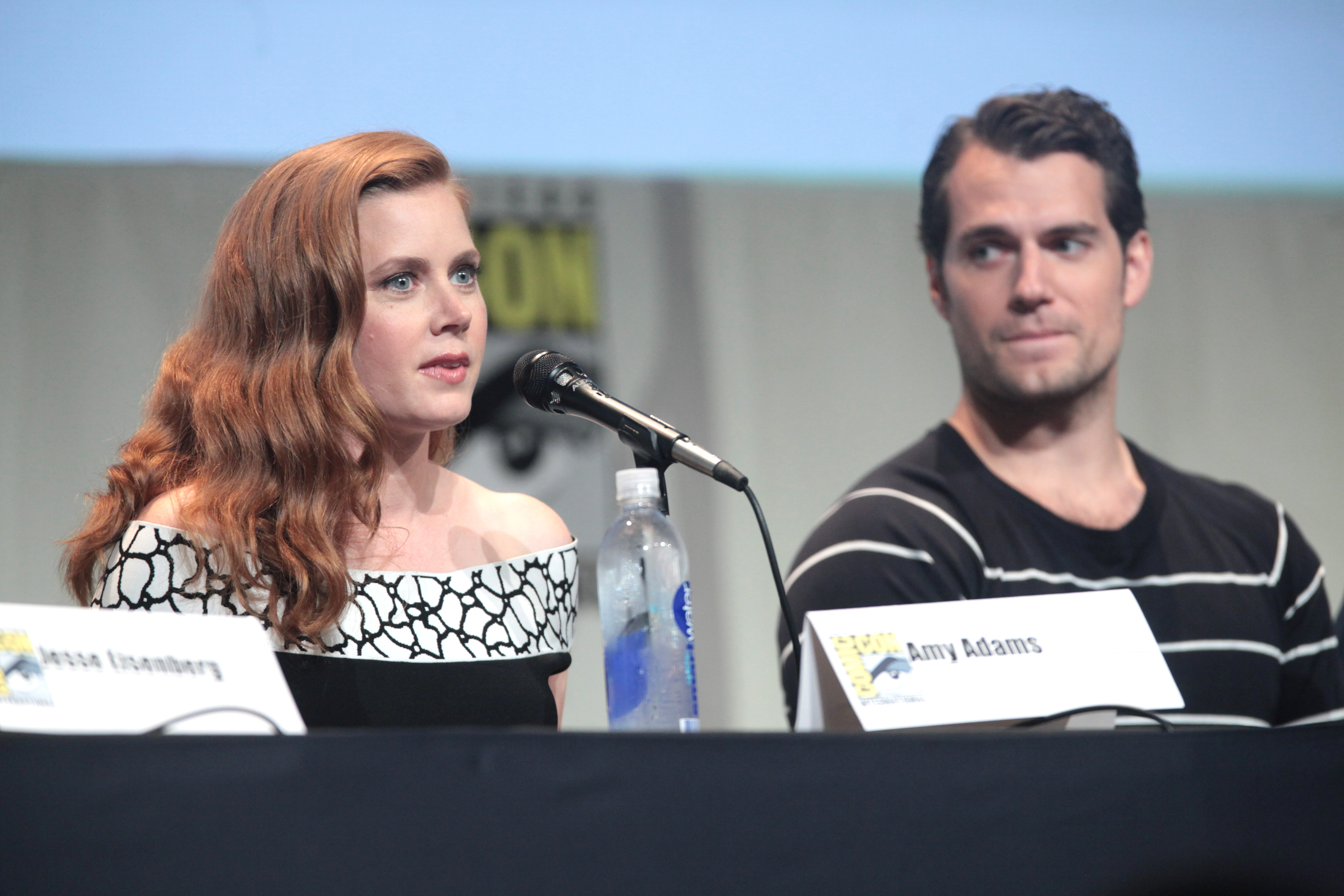
Adams and co-star Henry Cavill promoting Batman v Superman: Dawn of Justice at the 2015 San Diego Comic-Con in San Diego

After a one-year absence from the screen, Adams had three film releases in 2016. She first reprised the role of Lois Lane in Batman v Superman: Dawn of Justice, which marked the second installment in the DC Extended Universe after Man of Steel. Despite a negative critical reception for favoring visual effects over a coherent narrative, the film grossed $874 million to become her highest-grossing release to date. In her next two releases—the science fiction drama Arrival and the psychological thriller Nocturnal Animals—Adams played "emotionally guarded, fiercely intelligent" women to critical acclaim. Based on Austin Wright's novel Tony and Susan, Tom Ford's Nocturnal Animals tells the story of an unhappily married art dealer, Susan (Adams), who is traumatized when reading a violent novel written by her ex-husband (played by Jake Gyllenhaal). She found little resemblance between herself and the "poised" and "aloof" Susan, and modeled the character's personality on that of Ford. Stephanie Zacharek of Time magazine found the film visually arresting yet thematically weak, but credited Adams and Gyllenhaal for making their characters' pain seem genuine.

Arrival, directed by Denis Villeneuve and based on Ted Chiang's short story "Story of Your Life", ranks among the most acclaimed films of Adams's career. It focuses on Louise Banks (Adams), a linguist who experiences strange visions when she is hired by the U.S. government to interpret the language of extraterrestrials. Adams was drawn to the idea of playing an intellectual female lead, and connected with the film's theme of unity and compassion. She watched documentaries on linguistics in preparation for the role. Christopher Orr of The Atlantic described Adams's performance as "mesmerizingly open, by turns uplifting and sorrowful". Writing for the Los Angeles Times, Kenneth Turan noted her "finely calibrated performance" and asserted that the film was "a showcase for her ability to quietly and effectively meld intelligence, empathy and reserve". Arrival was a commercial success, grossing over $200 million against a production budget of $47 million, and Adams received Golden Globe and BAFTA nominations. Several journalists expressed disappointment over her failure to receive an Oscar nomination for it. She played Lois Lane for the third time in Justice League (2017), an ensemble film about the titular superheroes. Tim Grierson of Screen International wrote that despite providing "emotional resonance" to the film, Adams's talents had been wasted in a thankless supporting role.

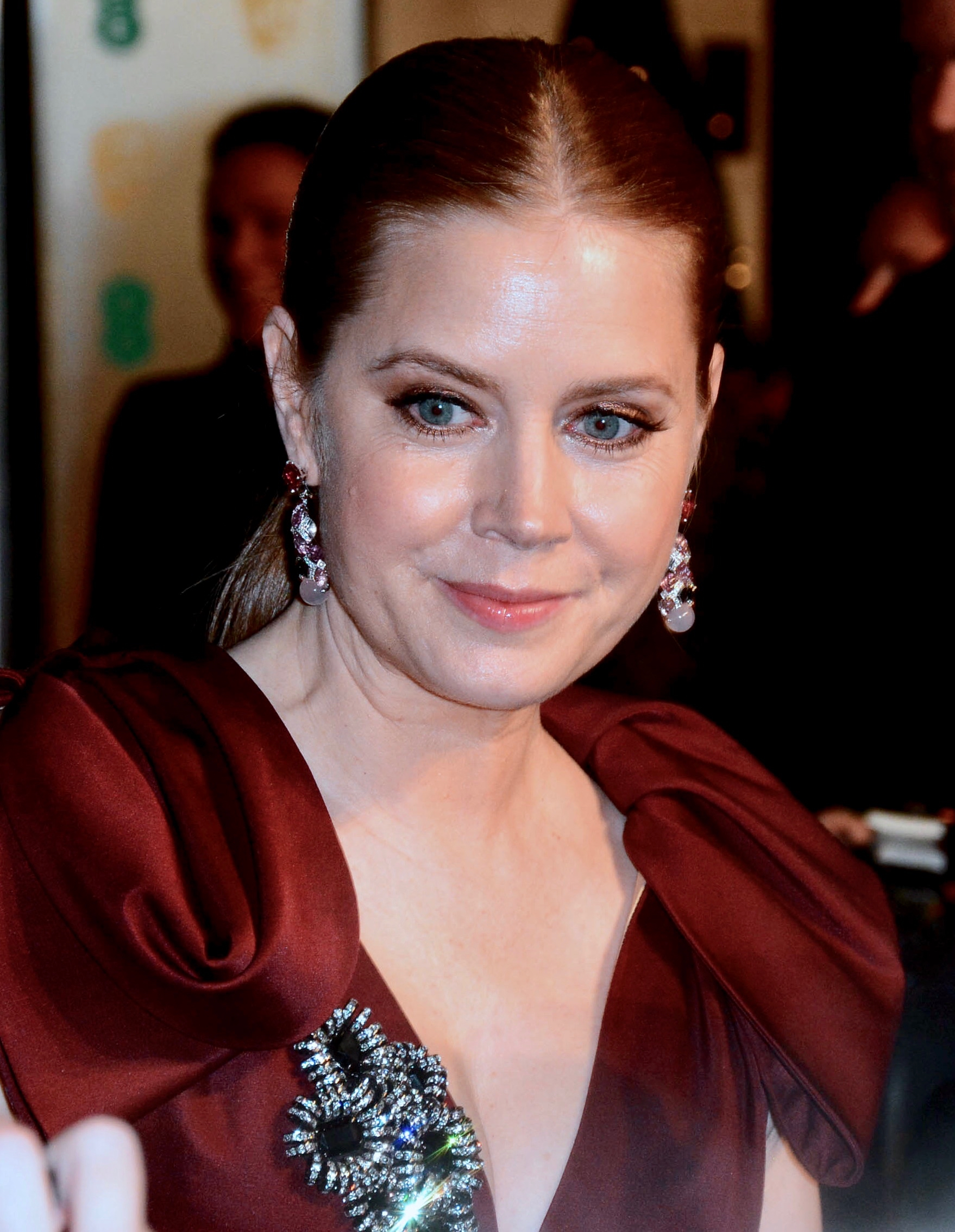
Adams at the 72nd British Academy Film Awards in 2019, where she was nominated for portraying Lynne Cheney in Vice (2018)

Adams returned to television in 2018 with Sharp Objects, an HBO miniseries based on Gillian Flynn's thriller novel of the same name. She served as an executive producer and starred as Camille Preaker, a self-harming reporter who returns to her hometown to cover the murder of two young girls. Adams gained weight for the part and, on days of filming, underwent three hours of prosthetic makeup to create her character's scarred body. She read A Bright Red Scream to learn about self-mutilation and researched the psychological condition of Munchausen syndrome by proxy. She found herself unable to detach from the dysfunctional role and experienced insomnia. The series and Adams's performance received critical acclaim; James Poniewozik of The New York Times praised the complex characterization of Preaker and called Adams's performance "transfixing". Daniel D'Addario of Variety found her to be "operating at the peak of her abilities" and added that with "her voice dropped an octave, slowed to a drawl, and sharpened with distrust, [she] is simply superb".

Christian Bale and Adams teamed for the third time in Adam McKay's political satire Vice (2018), in which they portrayed former vice president of the United States, Dick Cheney, and his wife, Lynne, respectively. She read Lynne's books in preparation; despite disagreeing with her political views, she approached the part with empathy and found a connection with her character's fortitude. Richard Lawson of Vanity Fair drew comparisons to Adams's role in The Master; he commended "her usual rigor" but criticized the "lazy rubber-stamp of a man's idea of a woman adjacent to power". Eric Kohn of IndieWire was more appreciative of her for "embodying an underwritten Lady Macbeth with ferocious energy". Adams received Golden Globe nominations for her performances in both Sharp Objects and Vice; for the former, she received a nomination for the Primetime Emmy Award for Outstanding Lead Actress in a Limited or Anthology Series or Movie and for the latter, she received her sixth Academy Award and seventh BAFTA nominations.

=== 2020–present: Critical disappointments ===
Adams began the new decade with the drama Hillbilly Elegy (2020), based on the book of the same name by JD Vance. It received negative reviews from critics; a reviewer for Rolling Stone stated that despite dependable work from Adams as Vance's substance-abusing mother, she was trapped in a poorly-written film. Multiple outlets criticized the film for not giving her character enough scenes to develop. Even so, she received a nomination for the Screen Actors Guild Award for Outstanding Performance by a Female Actor in a Leading Role. Adams next starred as an agoraphobic murder witness in Joe Wright's thriller The Woman in the Window, based on the novel of the same name. Filmed in 2018, the film was delayed several times due to poor test screenings and later, due to the COVID-19 pandemic; it was eventually released on Netflix in 2021. Adams then took on the supporting role of a grieving mother in Dear Evan Hansen, a film adaptation of the Broadway musical of the same name. Both The Woman in the Window and Dear Evan Hansen were poorly received.

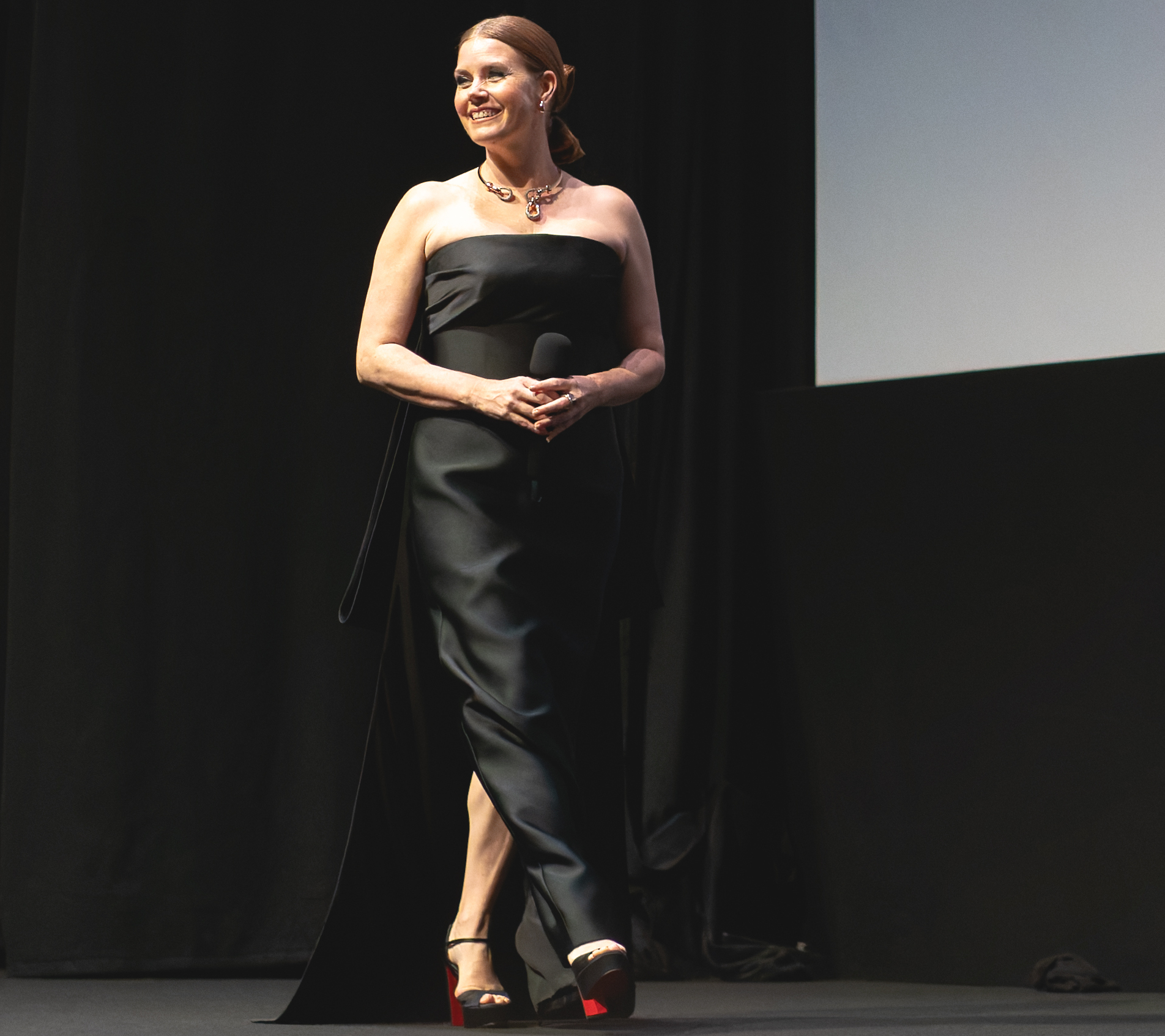
Adams promoting Nightbitch at the BFI London Film Festival, October 2024

In 2022, Adams made her first appearance in West End theatre in a revival of The Glass Menagerie at the Duke of York's Theatre. She played Amanda, a matriarch struggling to raise her children, for which she drew on her own mother's fierce and determined personality. The production received mixed reviews. Dominic Cavendish of The Daily Telegraph found Adams' performance "clear, simple, believable, and quietly heart-breaking in its contained vulnerability", but Evening Standard's Nick Curtis found it "muted and unconvincing". She then reprised her role as Giselle in the sequel to Enchanted, titled Disenchanted, which premiered on Disney+ on November 18, 2022. She also recorded six songs for its soundtrack. Critics took note of Adams' enduring charm but considered the sequel inferior to its predecessor.

Adams formed a production company named Bond Group Entertainment with her manager Stacy O'Neil in 2019. Their first release was a 2024 film adaptation of the satirical novel Nightbitch, starring Adams as a struggling mother who occasionally transforms into a dog. She found a connection with the material as she felt exhausted balancing her parental commitments while performing on stage. It received a polarizing reception from critics, which Adams said was the film's intent. She received a Golden Globe nomination for her performance. In 2025, Adams voiced the title character in the animated miniseries Charlotte's Web, streaming on HBO MAX.

In 2026, Adams starred in Kornél Mundruczó's drama At the Sea, and returned to television with the Apple TV+ thriller miniseries Cape Fear. In Cape Fear, Adams took on the lead role of Anna Bowden, a defense attorney whose past with killer Max Cady (Javier Bardem) comes back to haunt her. Adams next starred alongside alongside Jenna Ortega in Taika Waititi's science fiction film Klara and the Sun, based on the novel by Kazuo Ishiguro.

She is part of the cast of Star Wars: Starfighter, which is scheduled for release on May 28, 2027 and will be directed by Shawn Levy, who previously worked with her in Night at the Museum: Battle of the Smithsonian.

== Reception and acting style ==
Hadley Freeman of The Guardian wrote of Adams' off screen persona in 2016, saying that she "is extremely engaging, serious but with a hint of a straight-talking broad once she gets going". Carl Swanson of Vulture found her "suspiciously un-narcissistic for a Hollywood star, gracious, hardworking, and decent to the point of almost not being a celebrity". British journalist Alex Bilmes believes that Adams' ability to be "both glamorous movie star and relatable normal person is key to her success".

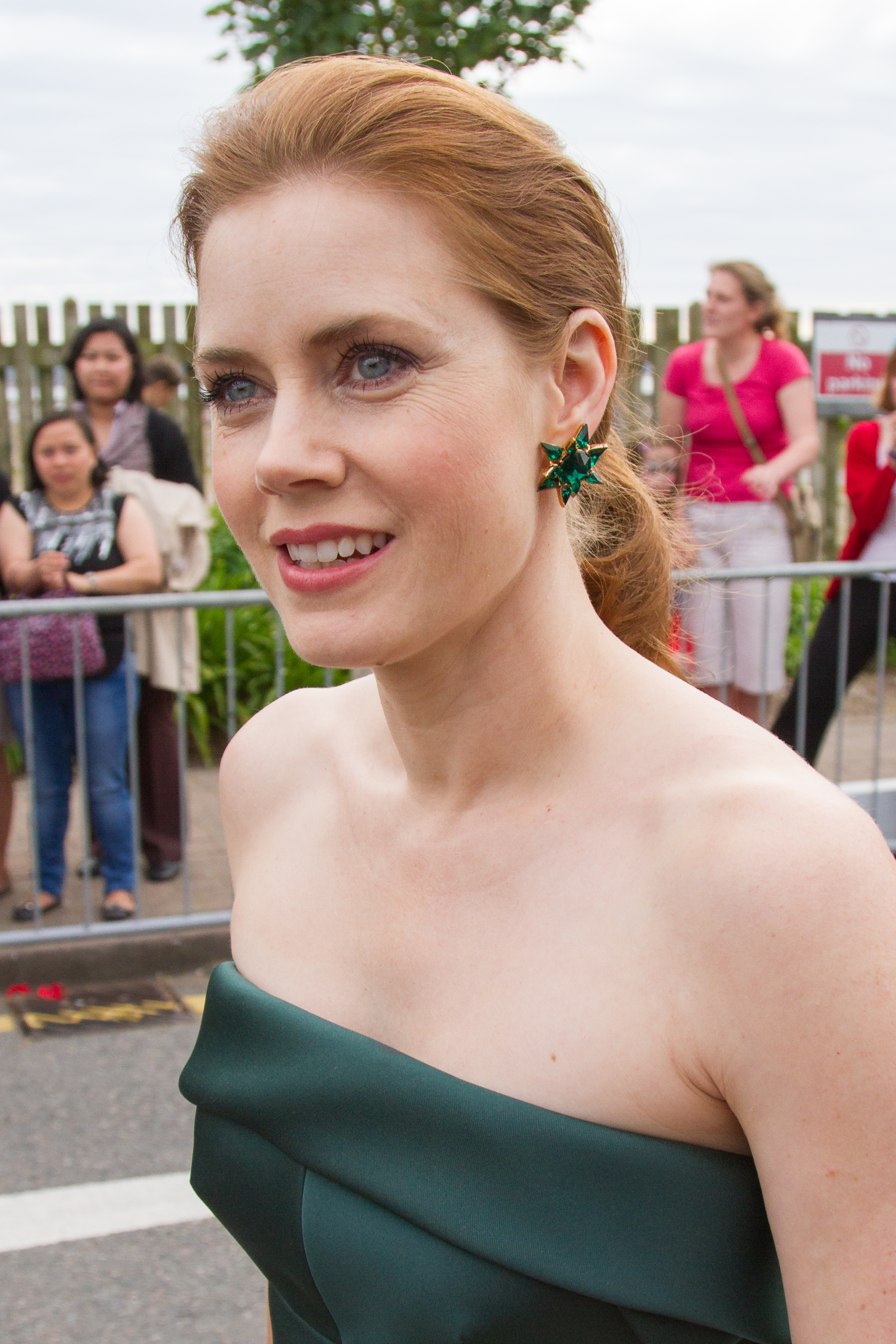
Adams at the premiere of Man of Steel in St Helier, Jersey

Adams works closely with her acting coach, Warner Loughlin, whom she credits with helping her organize and structure her thoughts. She uses an acting method Loughlin has taught her, in which she attempts to understand her character's psychology by creating the character's backstory from age three. Adams prefers to work with confident directors who give her space to think for herself. She stays in character during filming, and finds it difficult to detach herself from roles and accents. She is not influenced by the size of a role and is drawn to both leading and supporting parts. She has described herself as an obsessive performer.

Jake Coyle of The Washington Times considers Adams an actress who does not transform herself for her roles, but who inhabits "a character with warmth and smarts while, to varying degrees, remaining herself". Meryl Streep, her co-star in Doubt and Julie & Julia, has said that Adams comes highly prepared on set and possesses "a gigantic intelligence" in developing her character's arc. Paul Thomas Anderson, who directed her in The Master, commends her dedication and investment in her projects. Journalists have remarked upon her "American sweetheart" persona in her 2000s roles while taking note of her increased versatility in the 2010s. Novelist Stephen Marche called Adams "the greatest actress of her generation". In a 2016 review of Arrival, journalist and critic Anthony Lane of The New Yorker wrote of her career:

The spry benevolence that carried her through a film like Enchanted (2007) has been cross-grained, in recent years, by the stern resolve of The Master (2012) and the snap of American Hustle (2013), and now, in Arrival, her gift for sorrow, her strength, and her instinctive sweetness of temper are rolled into one.

Forbes ranked Adams among the world's highest-paid actresses, with earnings of over $13 million in 2014, and in 2016, and over $11 million in 2017. The magazine featured her on its annual Celebrity 100 list in 2014, and also ranked her among the most powerful actresses in the business. Also that year, she was named one of the 100 most influential people in the world by Time magazine. Adams received a star on the Hollywood Walk of Fame in 2017. As of 2017, her films have grossed over $4.7 billion worldwide. Robert Ito of The New York Times believes that her propensity for risky projects prevents her from being a bigger box-office draw.

Stuart McGurk of GQ cites Adams' "porcelain skin, auburn hair, and soft, earnest speaking style" as being among her trademarks. She was named one of the most beautiful people in America by Elle in 2011, and several publications have featured her red carpet appearances in their listings of best-dressed celebrities. Adams advertised Lacoste's fragrance Eau de Lacoste in 2012, and two years later, she endorsed accessories and handbags of Max Mara. In 2015, she collaborated with Max Mara to design and promote a line of handbags.

== Personal life and off-screen work ==
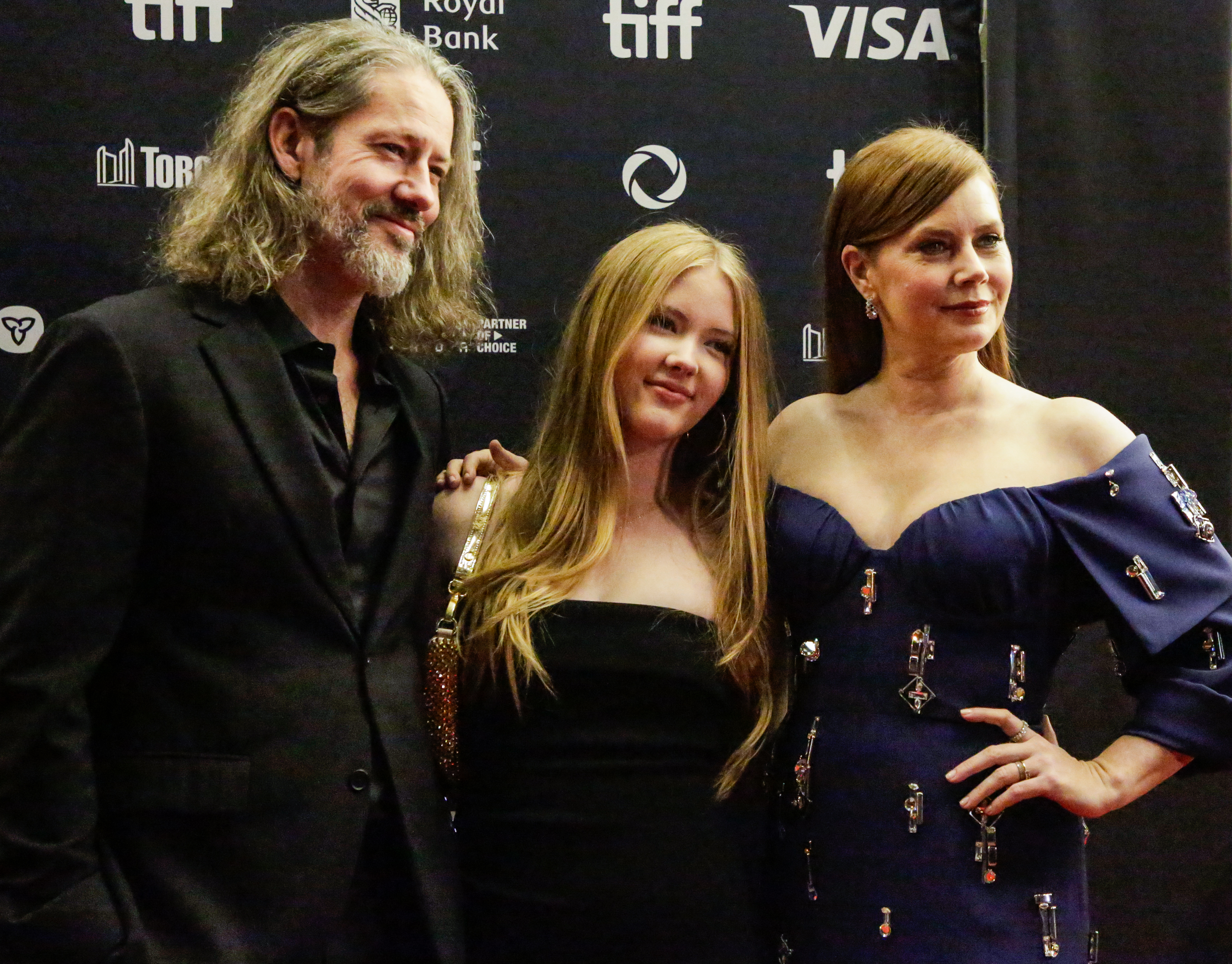
Adams with her husband, Darren Le Gallo, and their daughter at the 2024 TIFF

Adams met actor and painter Darren Le Gallo at an acting class in 2001. They began dating a year later while collaborating on a short film, Pennies. They became engaged in 2008. She gave birth to their daughter in 2010. Seven years after their engagement, the couple married, in a private ceremony, at a ranch near Santa Barbara, California. In 2016, Adams said that she appreciates the numerous sacrifices Le Gallo has made as the primary caregiver for their family. They live in Beverly Hills, California. She says that her family life is "pretty low-key", and her routine is going to work, taking her daughter to the park, and having weekly date nights with her husband.

Adams finds little value in being a celebrity and maintains that the "more that people know about me, the less they'll believe me and my characters". She attracts little gossip or tabloid attention, and strives to keep a healthy work-life balance. She makes an effort to remain unaffected by her fame, believing that it would hinder her ability to play roles with honesty. Adams has spoken about suffering from insecurity and a lack of confidence from a young age and how motherhood had made her calmer. She frequently breaks into song when stressed at work. She has joined other actors in calling for equal pay for women in the film industry, but she finds that actresses are too often asked to explain the gender pay gap and feels the questions should be directed instead to producers.

Having experienced difficulty in her early years in the film industry, Adams works closely with underprivileged students at New York City's Ghetto Film School. Variety honored her for her work with them in 2010. She supports the Trevor Project, a nonprofit organization that helps troubled LGBT teenagers, and served as a presenter for the 2011 event "Trevor Live". In 2013, she launched the book The Beauty Book for Brain Cancer to help raise money for brain cancer charities Snog and Headrush. The following year, she attended a charity event at the UCLA Medical Center, Santa Monica, to raise funds for sexually abused children. In 2020, Adams and actress Jennifer Garner launched the campaign #SaveWithStories to promote children's education during school closures due to the COVID-19 pandemic. Adams is an ambassador for The RightWay Foundation, a charity that provides employment and mental health services to former foster youth. Variety honored her for her work with them in 2024.

== Acting credits and accolades ==
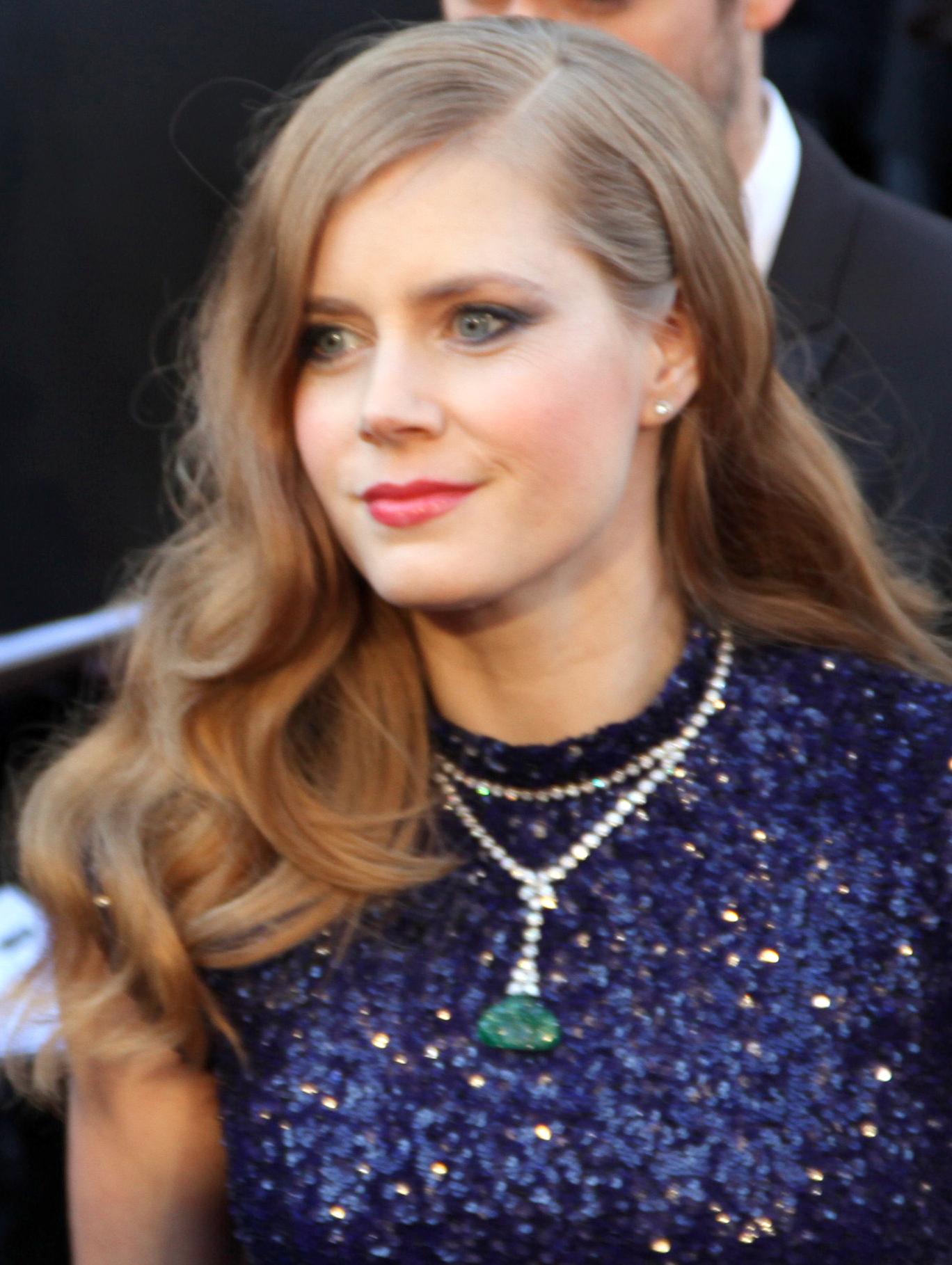
Adams at the 83rd Academy Awards in 2011

According to the review aggregator site Rotten Tomatoes and the box-office site Box Office Mojo, Adams's most critically acclaimed and commercially successful films are Catch Me If You Can (2002), Junebug (2005), Enchanted (2007), Doubt (2008), Night at the Museum: Battle of the Smithsonian (2009), Julie & Julia (2009), The Fighter (2010), The Muppets (2011), The Master (2012), Man of Steel (2013), Her (2013), American Hustle (2013), Big Eyes (2014), Batman v Superman: Dawn of Justice (2016), Arrival (2016), Nocturnal Animals (2016), and Justice League (2017).

Among her television projects, Adams has starred in the HBO miniseries Sharp Objects (2018). On stage, she has appeared in the Public Theater's revival of Into the Woods in 2012 and in a 2022 West End revival of The Glass Menagerie.

Adams has received six Academy Award nominations: Best Supporting Actress for Junebug (2005), Doubt (2008), The Fighter (2010), The Master (2012), and Vice (2018); and Best Actress for American Hustle (2013). She has twice won the Golden Globe Award for Best Actress in a Comedy or Musical, for American Hustle (2013) and Big Eyes (2014).

== See also ==
- List of American film actresses
- List of American television actresses
- List of actors with Academy Award nominations
- List of actors with more than one Academy Award nomination in the acting categories
- List of Golden Globe winners
- List of actors with Hollywood Walk of Fame motion picture stars
- List of stars on the Hollywood Walk of Fame
