= Phil Morrison (director) =

American film director

Phil Morrison is an American film director best known for the Academy Award-nominated feature film Junebug (2005), which was also his debut.

In 2006, Morrison directed the "Get a Mac" advertising campaign for Apple Inc. In 2011, he directed an episode of Enlightened.

His second film, in 2013, was All Is Bright.

In 2019, it was announced that Morrison was to direct Satan Is Real, a biopic about the Louvin Brothers, starring Ethan Hawke and Alessandro Nivola.
