= Coronado =

Coronado may refer to:

== People ==
- Coronado (surname)
- Francisco Vázquez de Coronado (1510–1554), Spanish explorer often referred to simply as "Coronado"
- Coronado Chávez (1807–1881), President of Honduras from 1845 to 1847

== Places ==
=== United States ===
- Coronado Butte, a summit in the Grand Canyon, Arizona
- Coronado, California, a city
- Coronado Heights, Kansas, a hill with a public park
- Coronado, Kansas, an unincorporated community
- Coronado Cave, Arizona
- Coronado Historic Site, New Mexico
- Coronado National Forest, in Arizona and New Mexico

=== Mexico ===
- Coronado Municipality, Chihuahua, Mexico
- Coronado Islands, island group in Tijuana municipality, Baja California, Mexico
- Isla Coronado, an island and volcano in Ensenada municipality, Baja California, Mexico
- Isla Coronados, Loreto Municipality, Baja California Sur, Mexico

=== Elsewhere ===
- Coronado, Alberta, Canada, a locality
- Vázquez de Coronado (canton), commonly shortened to Coronado, a canton in Costa Rica
- Coronado, Panama, a city
- Coronado (São Romão e São Mamede), a civil parish in Trofa, Portugal
- Coronado, Uruguay, a village in Artigas Department

== Arts and entertainment ==
- Coronado: Stories, collection of short stories by Dennis Lehane
- Coronado (1935 film), an American comedy film
- Coronado (2003 film), a German-American adventure film
- Fender Coronado, an electric guitar
- "Coronado" is a song by American indie rock band Deerhunter

== Military ==
- Operation Coronado, a series of military operations in the Vietnam War
- USS Coronado, several naval vessels
- Consolidated PB2Y Coronado, a World War II United States Navy flying boat
- Naval Base Coronado, a United States Navy base in California

== Transportation ==
- Convair 990 Coronado, a passenger jet
- Coronado Yachts, an American sailboat manufacturer
- Freightliner Coronado, a model of truck
- Coronado Railroad, a former railroad in Arizona

== Other uses ==
- Cisthene coronado, a moth of the family Erebidae
- Coronado High School (disambiguation)
- Coronado School (Albuquerque, New Mexico), an elementary school on the National Register of Historic Places
- Coronado Theatre, Rockford, Illinois, United States
- Coronado, an electronics brand of retailer Gamble-Skogmo

== See also ==
- Coronato, a surname
