= Massi Furlan =

Italian-American actor

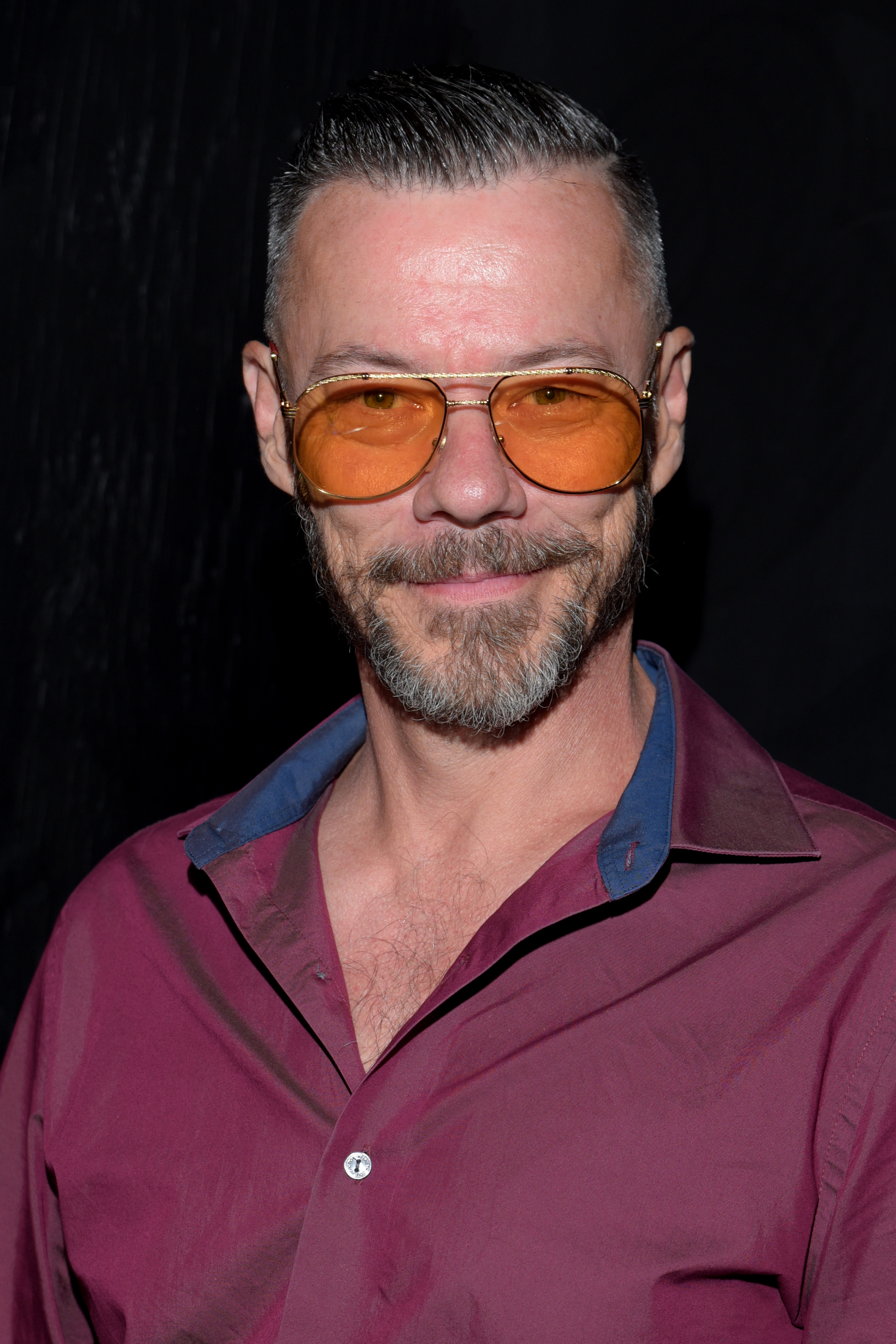
- Furlan in 2018
- Born: Massimiliano Furlan; 29 September 1968 (age 57); Treviso, Veneto, Italy
- Occupation: Actor

Massimiliano "Massi" Furlan (born 29 September 1968) is an Italian-American actor who began his entertainment career as a stand-up comedian. He is known for appearing in several television series and in the films The Dark Knight Rises (2012), Live by Night (2016), Jumanji: The Next Level (2019) and Bad Boys for Life (2020).

== Early life ==
Born Massimiliano Furlan in Treviso, Italy to Nereo and Giancarla Furlan, Massi is the eldest of their two sons. While growing up Massi loved to play soccer, a sport at which he excelled. He attended the Liceo artistico art school, specializing in painting.

When Massi was seventeen, he voluntarily joined the Italian Army and served for six years as a specialist in a helicopter crew.

== Acting career ==
In 2007 Massi moved to Hollywood, California where he quickly landed roles in the HBO pilot 1%, Days of Our Lives, and Terminator: The Sarah Connor Chronicles. These were soon followed by appearances on General Hospital, Criminal Minds, One Tree Hill, and Aim High.

Massi then appeared in a number of feature films, including The Dark Knight Rises, True Blood, Keeping Up with the Joneses, Trafficked and Live By Night.

Recently, Massi portrayed a designer of Gianni Versace on The Assassination of Gianni Versace: American Crime Story, and he guest starred as Luca Camilleri on Supernatural. He played the role of Switchblade in Jumanji: The Next Level, released in December 2019. Most recently, Massi appeared as the character Terry Taglin in Bad Boys for Life with Will Smith and Martin Lawrence.

== Filmography ==
Some of Massi's more notable projects include:

Title	Year	Role	Director	Notes #
Grey's Anatomy	2007	Police Officer	Michael Grossman	Uncredited, Episode: "Crash Into Me: Part 1"
Days of Our Lives	2008	Massi	Albert Alarr	1 episode
Medium	2009	Drug Cartel	Arlene Sanford	Uncredited, Episode: "Bring Me the Head of Oswaldo Castillo"
Bad Ass	2010	Rocco	Adamo P. Cultraro	feature film
General Hospital	2010	Giovanni	Phideaux Xavier	4 episodes
Criminal Minds	2011	Leon	Charles S. Carroll	Episode: "Supply and Demand"
Aim High	2011	Joey	Thor Freudenthal	4 episodes
One Tree Hill	2012	Zoran	James Lafferty	Episode: "Catastrophe and the Cure"
The Dark Knight Rises	2012	Janitor at GSE	Christopher Nolan	feature film
The Bay	2012	Anton	Gregori J. Martin	3 episodes
Layover	2012	Oscar	R.D. Braunstein	TV movie
NCIS: Los Angeles	2013	Mikhail Andros	Terrence O'Hara	2 episodes
Tumbleweed: A True Story	2014	Antonio	Emilio Roso	feature film
True Blood	2014	Nizar	Stephen Moyer	Episode: "Jesus Gonna Be Here"
Stalked By My Neighbor	2015	Borelli	Doug Campbell	TV movie
Live By Night	2016	Anthony Servidone	Ben Affleck	feature film
Trafficked	2017	Cesar	Will Wallace	feature film
Randy's Canvas	2018	Maurizio D'Oro	Sean Michael Beyer	feature film
Supernatural	2018	Luca Camilleri	Amanda Tapping	Episode: "A Most Holy Man"
Jumanji: The Next Level	2019	Switchblade	Jake Kasdan	feature film
Muna	2019	Adrian	Kevin Nwankwor	feature film
Bad Boys for Life	2020	Terry Taglin	Adil El Arbi and Bilall Fallah	feature film
The American King	2020	Sergei	Adah Obekpa	feature film
7th & Union	2021	Joe	Anthony Nardolillo	feature film
Amazon Queen	2021	Maciado	Marlin Darrah	feature film
Scarlett	2021	Micky Carbone	Massimiliano Trevis	TV movie
S.W.A.T.	2022	Pasha Kulpa	Shawn Ryan	Episode: "The Fugitive"
Wrong Place	2022	Virgil Brown	Mike Burns	feature film
Day Shift	2022	Sasha	J. J. Perry	feature film
Egyptian Affair	2022	Darius	Marlin Darrah	feature film
Sugar	2024	Carlos	Fernando Meirelles	5 episodes
