= World Gone By =

2015 novel by Dennis Lehane

- Author: Dennis Lehane
- Language: English
- Genre: Crime fiction
- Publisher: William Morrow and Company
- Publication date: March 10, 2015 (11 years ago)
- Publication place: United States
- Media type: Hardcover, audiobook
- Pages: 320
- ISBN: 978-0060004903
- OCLC: 886672432

World Gone By is a crime novel by Dennis Lehane that was published in 2015.

== Plot summary ==
Ten years after the events chronicled in the prior novel, Live by Night, Joe Coughlin is working as the consigliere to the crime family headed by his former partner Dion Bartolo. Outwardly, Joe is a respectable Tampa-area businessman active in charity events and a devoted single father to his son, Tomás. Inside the crime family, Joe is seen as a golden goose, as his sound business decisions enabled the family to profit in the years between Prohibition and World War II, and serves as a go-between for respectable society and the crime syndicate. He is seen as untouchable, but Joe soon learns from a convicted murderer that a hit has been placed on him, and spends the next two weeks unraveling the motives for the hit while simultaneously trying to avoid it.

== Reception ==
Critics were generally complimentary of the novel, which caps a loose trilogy of novels with characters populated from the Coughlin family. Janet Maslin of The New York Times called World Gone By "suspenseful, devious, well-constructed and ... filled with ethical questions." Colette Bancroft of Tampa Bay Times said the novel was "a classic gangster epic, a darkly violent tale enriched by sharp insight into American life and Lehane's beautifully crafted prose."
