= The Drop (Lehane novel) =

Book by Dennis Lehane

- Kindle movie edition
- Author: Dennis Lehane
- Language: English
- Published: September 2, 2014
- Publisher: William Morrow and Company
- Publication place: United States
- Media type: Print, e-book
- Pages: 224 pp.
- ISBN: 978-0-06-236544-6

The Drop is a 2014 novel by Dennis Lehane. It was adapted from a feature film of the same name, released in September 2014, and the last film of James Gandolfini. The film was an adaptation of a 2009 short story by Lehane, "Animal Rescue".

== Novelizations ==
- Novelization of The Drop (2014), film directed by Michaël R. Roskam, based on short story "Animal Rescue"
