= The Given Day =

2008 novel by Dennis Lehane

- First edition
- Author: Dennis Lehane
- Language: English
- Publisher: William Morrow and Company
- Publication date: September 23, 2008
- Publication place: United States
- Media type: Print (hardback & paperback)
- Pages: 704 p.
- ISBN: 978-0-688-16318-1
- Followed by: Live by Night

The Given Day is a novel by American writer Dennis Lehane published in September 2008; it is about the early twentieth-century period and set in Boston, Massachusetts, where its actions include the 1919 police strike. It also features Tulsa, Oklahoma, where the thriving Greenwood District was known as the "Black Wall Street".

== Plot summary ==
The Given Day is a historical novel set in Boston, Massachusetts and Tulsa, Oklahoma. The story has two main characters: Aiden "Danny" Coughlin, an ethnic Irish Boston Police patrolman, whose father is a prominent detective and captain in the department; and Luther Laurence, a talented black amateur baseball player from Columbus, Ohio.

The novel starts at the end of the First World War, when union organizing activities are high across the country. The year is 1918 and the BPD patrolmen have not been given a raise since 1905; they are working for below-poverty level wages. The Boston Social Club (BSC) is the fraternal organization of the BPD patrolmen and its members begin to discuss their grievances and possible actions. Due to his family's high status and reputation in the police department, Danny is reluctant to attend BSC meetings. His partner, Steve Coyle, is able to get him to attend some meetings where the BSC hopes to join the American Federation of Labor, a national union. BPD Captain Thomas Coughlin (Danny's father), FBI agent Rayme Finch, and a Department of Justice lawyer, the young J. Edgar Hoover, assign Danny to infiltrate the Roxbury Lettish Workingman's Society in promise of his detective's stripes. Danny is told that they may be collaborating with other radical cells to plan a national revolt on May Day. As Danny is undercover attending meetings with the Letts, he begins to identify with some of the principles they preach. He soon is elected as the vice-president of the BSC.

Luther Laurence and his pregnant wife, Lila, move from Columbus to Tulsa, Oklahoma to start a new life closer to some of her relatives in the Greenwood District. Laurence and his friend Jessie earn some extra money running numbers for a local bookie and gangster, Deacon Skinner Brocious. When Jessie gets caught skimming from Deacon, a deadly confrontation ensues. Laurence has to leave his wife in Tulsa and flees to Boston, where his uncle sets him up with the Giddreauxs, a black couple who lead the Boston chapter of the recently formed National Association for the Advancement of Colored People (NAACP). In Boston Luther gets work as a handyman and servant in the home of police Captain Thomas Coughlin. While working for the Coughlins, Laurence becomes close friends with Nora O'Shea, an Irish immigrant and servant. She was taken in by the Coughlins five years earlier, when the captain found her shivering in the streets on Christmas Eve. Nora and Danny had a love affair, which ended when he discovered a dark secret from her past. She has become engaged to his younger brother, a rising attorney.

Luther is manipulated by Lieutenant Eddie McKenna, best friend to Captain Coughlin and godfather to Danny. Delving into Luther's past, McKenna has discovered that he is running from the deadly altercation in Tulsa. Laurence has been earning his board at the Giddreauxs' home by renovating an old building as the new NAACP headquarters in Boston. McKenna forces him to obtain NAACP membership information and to build a secret chamber in the new headquarters.

When the Coughlins discover Nora's secret, she is banned from their household. Luther is banned after being caught spending time with her and giving her food. Danny's involvement in the BSC takes him away from his family as well; his father is particularly opposed to Danny's new "radical and Bolshevik-like" views. Nora, Danny and Luther form a close friendship. Nora is on her own just as she was five years ago, the men of the BPD are counting on Danny to lead them to a fair wage and working conditions, and Laurence is trying to escape McKenna's clutches and make it back to his wife and child.

The story culminates in the historical Boston Police Strike, which is precipitated by the police commissioner's refusal to allow the nascent police union's right to affiliate with national labor organizations, or to exist. In the chaos of the strike, Luther saves Danny's life. By this time Danny had reunited with and married Nora. Luther reconciles the difficult situation he had run from in Tulsa, and succeeds in returning there to join his wife and recently born child in the Greenwood District. (This is before the area was destroyed in the 1921 Tulsa race massacre.)

== Babe Ruth storyline ==
The notable historic ball player Babe Ruth is featured as a recurring character in The Given Day, along with other historic figures. He appears in the prologue and various transitions within the novel. In the prologue, the Boston Red Sox and Chicago Cubs are traveling by train from Chicago to Boston during the 1918 World Series. The train breaks down in Ohio. Ruth happens upon a pick-up game among some African-American players, one of whom happens to be Luther Laurence. Ruth admires his skills, then is joined by other of the Cubs and Red Sox players, who want to take on the African Americans. Ruth's team ends up cheating and although he knows it is wrong, he sides with his teammates. He is ashamed of his action and reflects on it at different points when he re-appears in the book.

== Reception ==
Critics were generally favorable, commenting that Lehane had written a big American novel. Janet Maslin wrote in The New York Times, "He has written a majestic, fiery epic that moves him far beyond the confines of the crime genre." She concludes by writing:

The Given Day is a huge, impassioned, intensively researched book that brings history alive by grounding the present in the lessons of the past. When Mr. Lehane writes of “a man who wore his power like a white suit on a coal black night,” he could be writing about a distant time — or writing about his own.

Colette Bancroft of the St. Petersburg Times wrote "That time and place give Lehane scope to tell a uniquely American story, one grounded in our history yet ringing with issues that concern us still, almost a century later: race, immigration, terrorism, economic instability, political corruption and the corrosive gap between the haves and have-nots."
