= Live by Night (film) =

2016 film by Ben Affleck

- Theatrical release poster
- Directed by: Ben Affleck
- Screenplay by: Ben Affleck
- Based on: Live by Night by Dennis Lehane
- Produced by: Leonardo DiCaprio; Jennifer Davisson; Ben Affleck; Jennifer Todd
- Starring: Ben Affleck; Elle Fanning; Brendan Gleeson; Chris Messina; Sienna Miller; Zoe Saldaña; Chris Cooper
- Cinematography: Robert Richardson
- Edited by: William Goldenberg
- Music by: Harry Gregson-Williams
- Production companies: RatPac-Dune Entertainment; Appian Way Productions; Pearl Street Films
- Distributed by: Warner Bros. Pictures
- Release dates: December 13, 2016 (New York City); December 25, 2016 (United States)
- Running time: 129 minutes
- Country: United States
- Language: English
- Budget: $90 million (gross); $65 million (net)
- Box office: $22.7 million

Live by Night is a 2016 American action crime drama film written, directed, produced by and starring Ben Affleck. Based on the 2012 novel of the same name by Dennis Lehane, the film follows an ambitious Ybor City bootlegger (Affleck) who becomes a notorious gangster. The film also stars Elle Fanning, Brendan Gleeson, Chris Messina, Sienna Miller, Zoe Saldaña, and Chris Cooper.

Produced by Warner Bros. Pictures, the film premiered in New York City on December 13, 2016. It began a limited release in the United States on December 25, 2016, before going wide on January 13, 2017. It received mixed reviews and was a box-office bomb, grossing $22 million against its net budget of $65 million. The film lost around $75 million, according to insiders and rival studio executives.

== Plot ==
In 1926, Joe Coughlin, an Irish-American World War I veteran and the prodigal son of Boston police captain Thomas Coughlin, falls in love with Emma Gould, the mistress of notorious gangster Albert White, the boss of the Irish Gang of Boston who Joe and his friends have been targeting in a series of robberies. Thomas objects to the relationship and advises Joe against his criminal activities, warning him that his wrongdoing will catch up with him eventually.

White's rival, Italian Mafia boss Maso Pescatore, finds out about their affair and blackmails Joe to kill White. Joe refuses, and instead he and Emma decide to flee to California. To fund the trip, Joe commits a bank heist with his partner Dion Bartolo and another man, during which three police officers are killed in an ensuing chase. When Joe goes to meet Emma, he discovers that she betrayed him to White. Joe is brutally beaten by White's men and nearly killed before Thomas and the police arrive and arrest Joe for the policemen's murders.

Thomas tells Joe that Emma drowned while being pursued by police. He also blackmails Chief Inspector Calvin Bondurant to ensure that Joe is indicted on a relatively minor charge rather than murder, and he is given only a three-year sentence. Two weeks before Joe's release, Thomas dies of a heart attack. Wanting revenge against White, Joe volunteers his services to Pescatore and is recruited as an enforcer for the latter's rum empire in Ybor City in Tampa, Florida, which is under attack by White. Joe brings Dion along and together they protect Pescatore's business in the area; the boss then sends orders for them to bring gambling and drugs into Tampa. Joe also develops a relationship with Graciela Corrales, the sister of a local Cuban businessman who supplies most of the rum, and they are soon married.

Joe befriends Sheriff Irving Figgis to get police protection for his bootlegging. Irving's daughter Loretta heads to Hollywood to become an actress but instead becomes a heroin-addicted prostitute. Irving's brother-in-law, R. D. Pruitt, a member of the local chapter of the Ku Klux Klan who blames Joe for bringing more non-white immigrants into Tampa, starts bombing Joe's businesses and killing his men. Joe promises Irving to help get Loretta off drugs and back to Ybor City in exchange for betraying Pruitt. Joe kills Pruitt personally and has his men hunt down and kill all of Tampa's KKK members in a string of brutal assassinations.

With Prohibition coming to an end, Pescatore orders Joe to switch to selling narcotics, which he disagrees with, instead planning to build a mob casino near Sarasota. He intends to persuade the state government to legalize gambling, but Loretta, who has become a devout Christian under her father's strict and punishing discipline, begins preaching that alcohol and gambling are against God's word. Her ministry is popular enough that the government decides not to legalize gambling. Joe recognizes that Pescatore will be enraged, particularly since Joe still refuses to invest in narcotics.

During a private meeting in a restaurant to settle their differences, Loretta confides to Joe that she does not truly believe in God and her sins cannot be forgiven. The next day, Joe is despondent to learn that Loretta committed suicide. While visiting his brother-in-law, an amateur photographer, Joe finds a recent picture of Emma, whom he believed to be dead. He decides to pursue her, but only after informing Graciela first, much to Dion's dismay.

Pescatore orders Joe to meet with him at a local hotel, where he reveals he has reconciled with White and given him the honor of killing Joe for his failures, planning to replace him with his son Digger. Anticipating Pescatore's betrayal, Joe distracts White by showing him Emma's picture, as White also believed her to be dead. Dion and his men ambush Pescatore's gang through a series of tunnels Joe had previously used to move rum into the hotel. In the ensuing gunfight, White, Pescatore and Digger are all killed, eliminating all of Joe's enemies in one stroke. He names Dion as his successor before locating Emma at the brothel she now works at. She relates how she faked her death to escape from White and enjoys her newfound freedom, and claims she never reciprocated Joe's love for her. Satisfied, Joe returns to Graciela.

Joe and Graciela move to Miami, where they have a son, Tommy, and devote their time to building houses for the impoverished. Driven insane by Loretta's death, Figgis tracks them down and shoots up their house, killing Graciela before being fatally shot by Joe. Joe arranges for Graciela to be buried in her homeland in Cuba and spends the rest of his days dedicated to charity and to raising Tommy, who soon voices his desire to become a police officer.

== Cast ==
- Ben Affleck as Joseph Joe Coughlin
- Elle Fanning as Loretta Figgis
- Brendan Gleeson as Captain Thomas Coughlin
- Chris Messina as Dion Bartolo
- Sienna Miller as Emma Gould
- Zoe Saldaña as Graciela Corrales
- Remo Girone as Maso Pescatore
- Robert Glenister as Albert White
- Matthew Maher as R.D. Pruitt
- Massi Furlan as Anthony Servidone
- Miguel J. Pimentel as Esteban Suarez
- Chris Cooper as Chief Irving Figgis
- Zak Lee Guarnaccia as Adomo Valocco
- Titus Welliver as Tim Hickey
- Max Casella as "Digger" Pescatore
- Christian Clemenson as a Ritz Investor
- J. D. Evermore as Virgil Beauregard
- Clark Gregg as Chief Inspector Calvin Bondurant
- Chris Sullivan as Brendan Loomis
- Anthony Michael Hall as Gary L. Smith
- Ben Ciaramello as Paulo Bartolo
- Derek Mears as Donnie Gishler
- Gianfranco Terrin as Carmine Parone

== Production ==
=== Development ===
Warner Bros. acquired the rights to Dennis Lehane's Live by Night in April 2012, with the intention of developing the project as a starring vehicle for Leonardo DiCaprio, through his Appian Way Productions. In October 2012, it was announced that Ben Affleck would direct, write, and star in the film; he and Jennifer Todd would produce through their production company Pearl Street Films, along with Appian Way's DiCaprio and Jennifer Davisson Killoran.

=== Pre-production ===
In the summer of 2013, Affleck and film crew members visited Tampa, Florida, and Lawrence, Massachusetts, to scout for locations. In August 2013, it was reported that production would be pushed back from the fall of 2013 to the fall of 2014, due to Affleck's acting commitments in Gone Girl (2014) and Batman v Superman: Dawn of Justice (2016). He visited various locations in Brunswick, Georgia in the summer of 2014. Affleck stated in a September 2014 interview that the film had been green-lit: "It's supposed to start shooting in July [2015] and I'll start prepping in March. We got a budget, we got locations." On September 4, 2014, Sienna Miller, Zoe Saldaña, and Elle Fanning joined the cast of the film. Affleck visited Brunswick, Georgia, again in February 2015.

On July 9, 2015, Warner Bros.' decision to green-light the film was officially announced. Miller, Saldana and Fanning were all still attached to the project. From August to December 2015, other cast members were gradually revealed, including Chris Messina, Chris Cooper, Miguel, Max Casella, Scott Eastwood (who did not appear in the finished film), Brendan Gleeson, Anthony Michael Hall, and Titus Welliver.

=== Filming ===
Principal photography began on October 28, 2015, in coastal Georgia. Exterior scenes were filmed in Brunswick, at Affleck's private property on Hampton Island near Riceboro, on Tybee Island, in Savannah, and at Fort Pulaski National Monument. Tampa's film commissioner said tax rebates in both Georgia and Affleck's home on Hampton Island, a 45-minute drive from Brunswick, had led the filmmakers to choose the state instead of Florida. Filming took place in Lawrence, North Andover, and Boston's North End. From December 2015 to February 2016, filming took place in Los Angeles, California. Scenes were shot at the Millennium Biltmore Hotel in Los Angeles, Pasadena, and in Wilmington.

Cinematographer Robert Richardson used both the Arri Alexa 65 and vintage 65 lenses from Panavision.

Set in Brunswick, Georgia
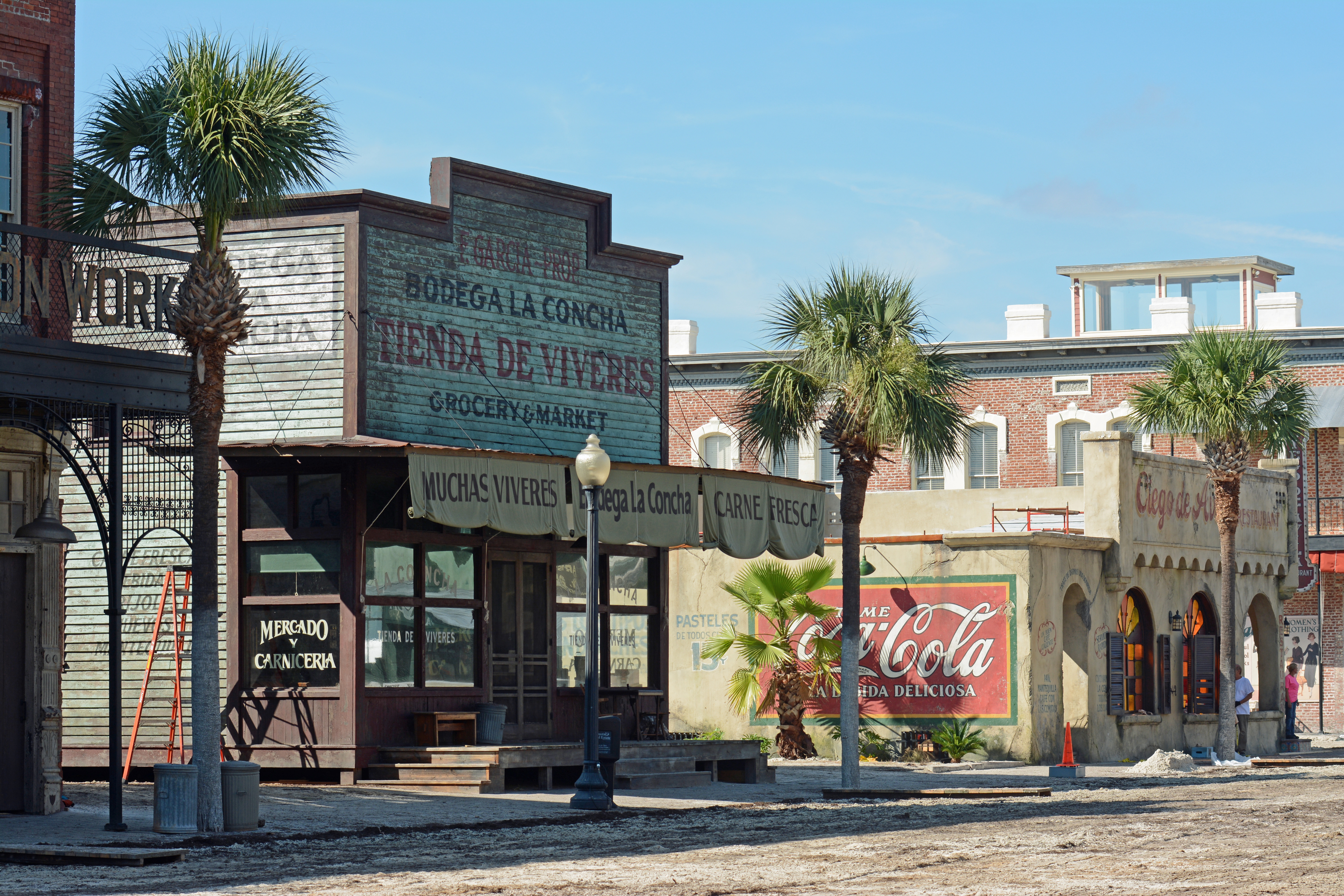

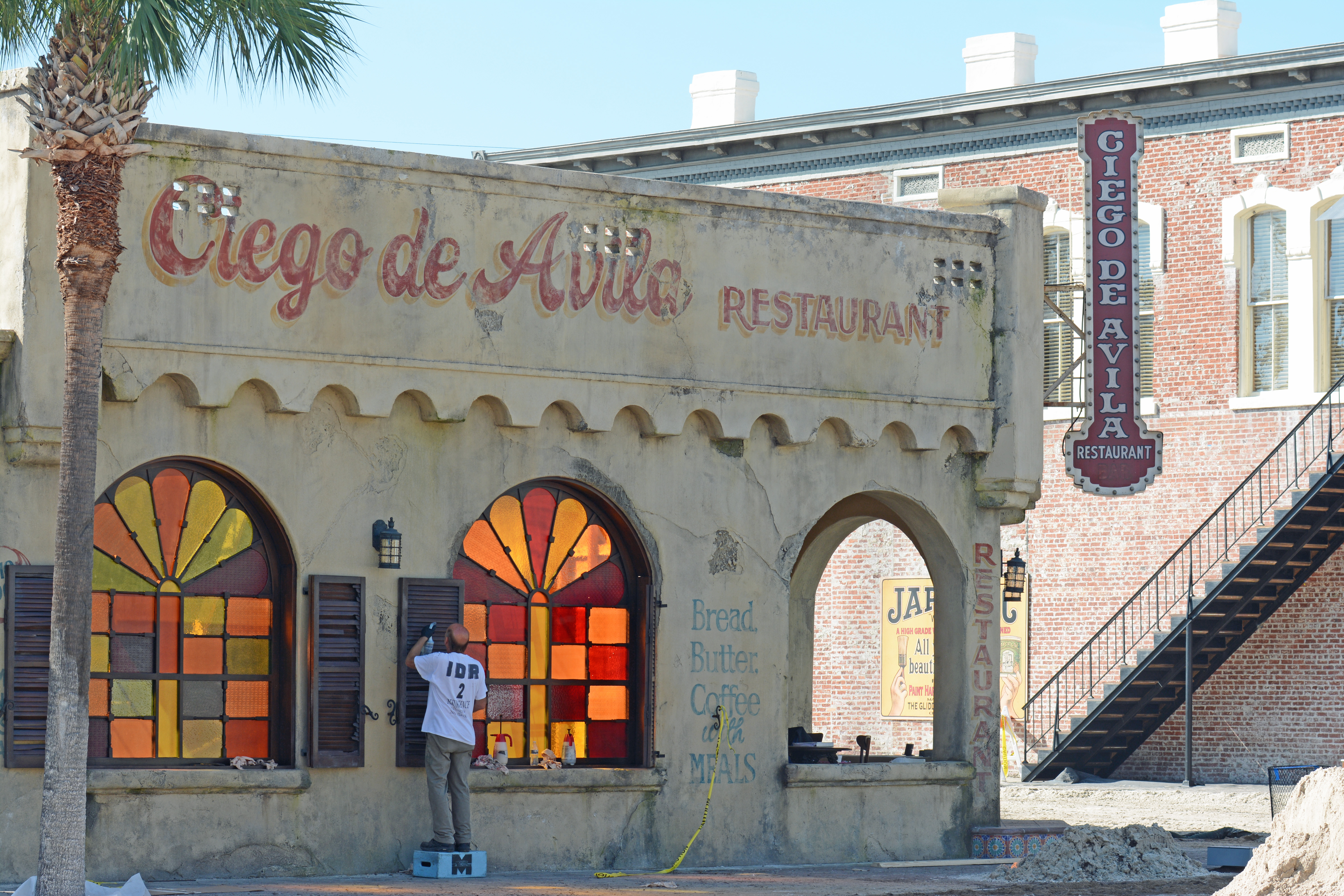

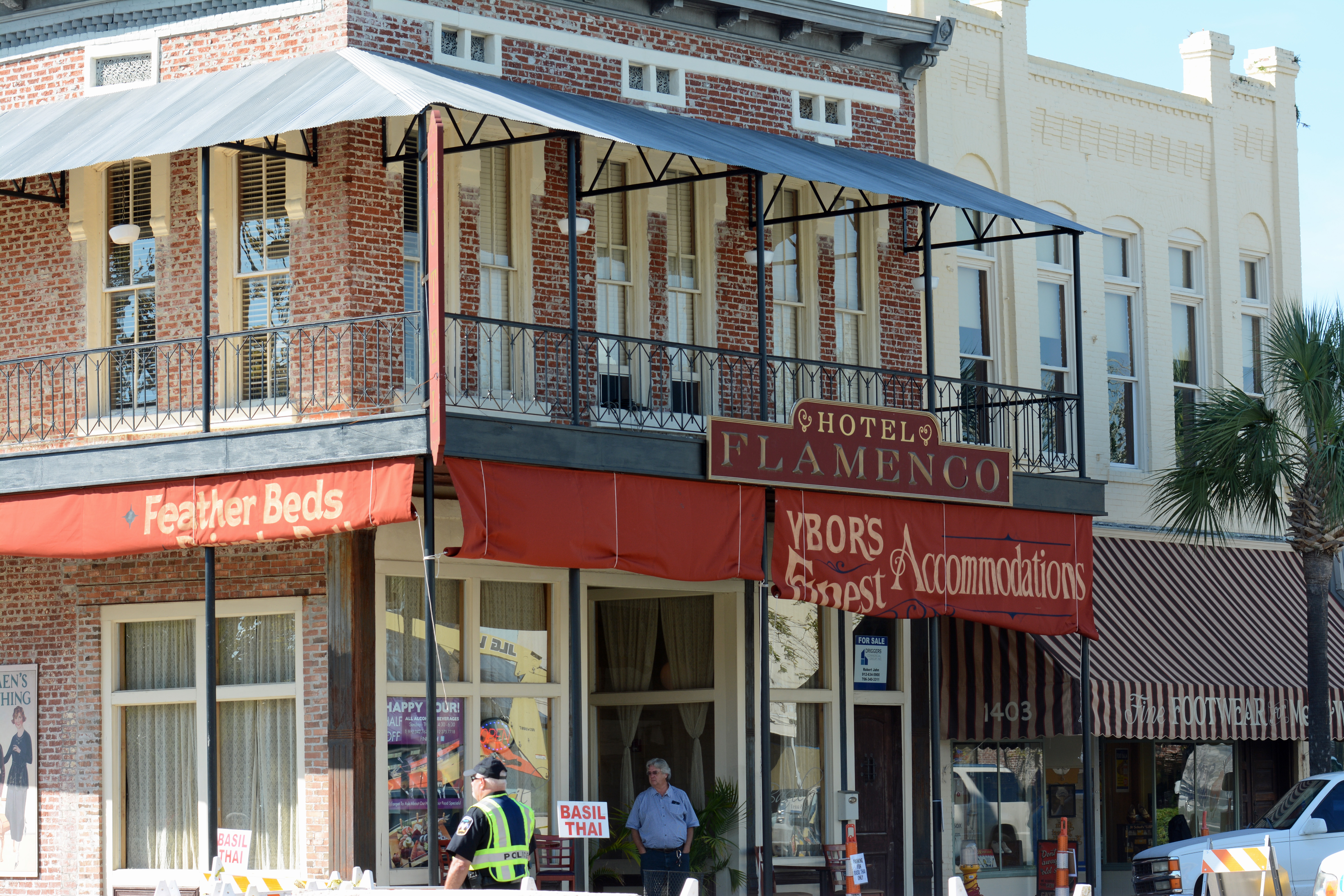

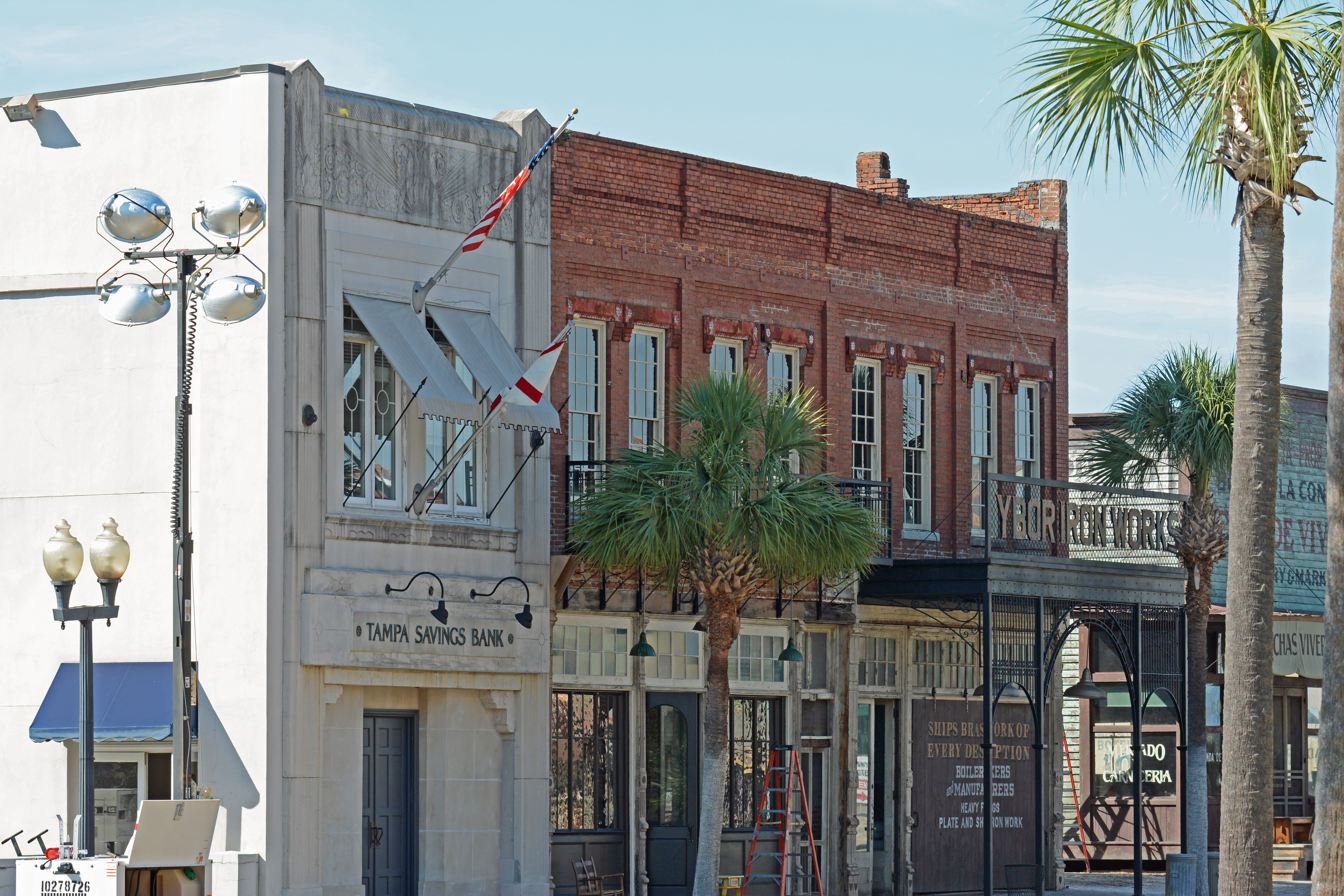

=== Post-production ===
William Goldenberg signed on as the film's editor; he had previously worked with Affleck on Gone Baby Gone and Argo. Harry Gregson-Williams, who previously worked with Affleck on Gone Baby Gone and The Town, composed the score. In March 2016, Affleck remarked: "Editing is a strange process. It's a lot of ups and downs, but overall, the movie has amazing performances. I just got so lucky with the cast. They're incredible ... The hardest part about the process now is trying to find stuff to cut out because I don't want the movie to be too long."

== Release ==
In November 2013, Warner Bros. scheduled the film for a Christmas 2015 release date. In May 2014, the release date was moved to October 7, 2016, and, in August 2015, it was pushed to an unknown release date in 2017. In March 2016, Warner Bros. stated that the film would be released on October 20, 2017. In June 2016, however, the release date was changed to January 13, 2017. In October 2016, the film was pushed up to a limited release on December 25, 2016, before opening wide on January 13.

== Reception ==
=== Box office ===
Live by Night grossed $10.4 million in the United States and Canada and $12.3 million in other territories for a worldwide total of $22.7 million, against a net production budget of $65 million.

Over its first two days of release, the film grossed $49,000 (including $33,000 on its opening day) for a four-theater average of $8,250, finishing 34th at the box office. In North America, the film had its expansion alongside new openers Monster Trucks, The Bye Bye Man and Sleepless, as well as the wide releases of Silence and Patriots Day. It was expected to gross around $10 million from 2,822 theaters in its four-day MLK opening weekend. It ended up debuting to $5.1 million (a four-day total of $6.2 million), finishing 11th at the box office. Deadline Hollywood attributed the film's poor opening to its crowded release weekend, as well as lack of critical praise and award buzz. 54% of its opening weekend attendance was male, while 88% was over the age of 25. The film grossed $1.8 million in its second weekend of wide release (a drop of 64.8%), falling to 15th at the box office.

In its third week of wide release the film was pulled from 94.1% of theaters (2,822 to 163) and grossed just $101,028, marking at the time the largest third-week wide-release theater drop in history (besting the 2,523 theater decrease set by Meet Dave in 2008); the record was overtaken by The Darkest Minds on its third week of release in August 2018. Due to its poor performance, the film is expected to lose Warner Bros. around $75 million.

=== Critical response ===
On review aggregation website Rotten Tomatoes, 35% of 239 critics gave the film a positive review, with an average rating of 5.2/10. The site's critics consensus reads, "Live by Night boasts visual style and an impressive cast, but they're lost in a would-be crime saga that finds producer, director, and star Ben Affleck revisiting familiar themes to diminishing effect." On Metacritic, which assigns a normalized rating, the film has a weighted average score of 49 out of 100, based on 43 critics, indicating "mixed or average" reviews. Audiences surveyed by CinemaScore gave the film an average grade of "B" on an A+ to F scale.

Mike Ryan of Uproxx gave the film a mixed review, and noted that it felt rushed to completion, saying, "I am a fan of the movies Ben Affleck has directed. That's why Live by Night is such a disappointment. I was actively looking forward to it. And I would have given it any benefit of the doubt, but this movie just isn't there. It feels like a rushed project that Affleck had to get out of the way before he plays Batman again." Owen Gleiberman of Variety also gave the film a mixed review, writing: "It's like seeing the ghost of a terrific movie: All the pieces are in place, yet as you're watching it (or thinking back on it afterwards), there doesn't seem to be quite enough there."

David Rooney of The Hollywood Reporter wrote, "Live by Night is solid enough entertainment, but it lacks the nasty edge or narrative muscularity to make it memorable." Eric Kohn of IndieWire gave the film a C, writing: "Ultimately, Live by Night doesn't suggest Affleck's lost his groove so much as that his groove has its limits. Saddled with derivative material, he can't seem to find a fresh approach."
