= Since We Fell =

2017 book by Dennis Lehane

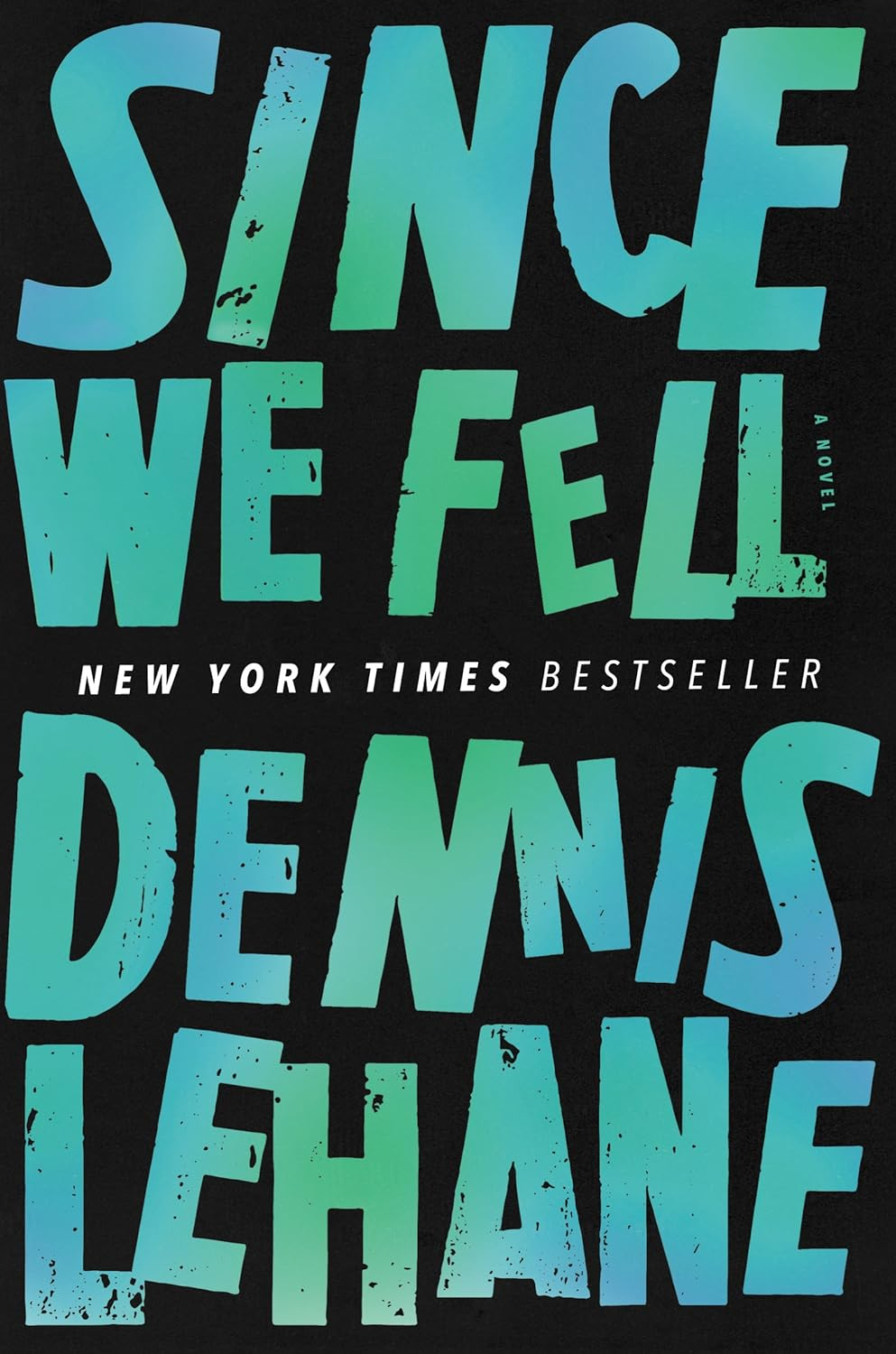
- HC DJ, 1st ed.
- Author: Dennis Lehane
- Cover artist: Rachel Willey
- Language: English
- Genre: Psychological thriller
- Publisher: Little, Brown
- Publication date: May 9, 2017 (9 years ago)
- Publication place: United States
- Media type: Hardcover
- Pages: 400
- ISBN: 978-1408708330

Since We Fell is a psychological thriller novel by American author Dennis Lehane, published in May 2017.

== Plot summary ==
Rachel Childs is a former print and television journalist whose career ended following an on-air meltdown precipitated by conditions she encountered while covering the 2010 Haiti earthquake. In the wake of her blooper, she develops agoraphobia and ends her marriage to Sebastian, a producer at her television station. Eighteen months later, she marries Brian Delacroix, who she had hired as a private detective to find the father who left her and her mother Elizabeth when Rachel was a child.

The story opens with Rachel shooting Brian dead, a flashforward from scenes that follow the fallout from a chance encounter that caused her to question her second marriage and husband.

== Development ==
The novel's title derives from "Since I Fell for You", a song which first charted in 1947.

Lehane noted the main difficulty in writing the book "was making sure I didn't see [Rachel] through guy goggles", and received feedback from female advance readers to ensure a realistic female perspective throughout the novel, Lehane's first entirely written with a woman's point of view. The novel and screenplay were not developed simultaneously. Lehane was influenced by John Irving's novel A Widow for One Year when preparing the third draft of the novel, which is when the first 100 pages of the book were developed to tell the story of Rachel's past.

== Reception ==
Reviewing for The New York Times, Janet Maslin wrote the novel "[is] packed with signs that Lehane sold this story to the movies, which he did, in 2015, and that he loves the Hitchcock classics that prey on mistrust." In The Washington Post, Neely Tucker described it as "a pleasantly twisted character study and a love story told in no particular rush."

== Film adaptation ==
The filming rights were acquired by DreamWorks following a summer 2015 bidding war while the novel was still being written. Lehane announced he would write the screenplay after completing the novel.
