= Sacred (novel) =

1997 crime novel by Dennis Lehane

- First edition
- Author: Dennis Lehane
- Language: English
- Series: Kenzie and Gennaro
- Genre: Crime
- Publication date: 1997
- Publication place: United States
- Pages: 320
- ISBN: 0-688-14381-4
- Preceded by: Darkness, Take My Hand
- Followed by: Gone, Baby, Gone

Sacred (1997) is a crime novel by American writer Dennis Lehane, the third book in his Kenzie/Gennaro series.

== Plot ==
Patrick Kenzie and Angela Gennaro are hired by a dying billionaire to find his daughter, Desiree, after the previous detective working the case, Jay Becker, disappeared.

== Awards ==
The novel won the 1998 Nero Award and was nominated for the Shamus Award for "Best Private Eye Novel" in the same year.
