= Mystic River (film) =

2003 American drama film directed by Clint Eastwood

- Theatrical release poster
- Directed by: Clint Eastwood
- Screenplay by: Brian Helgeland
- Based on: Mystic River by Dennis Lehane
- Produced by: Clint Eastwood; Robert Lorenz; Judie G. Hoyt
- Starring: Sean Penn; Tim Robbins; Kevin Bacon; Laurence Fishburne; Marcia Gay Harden; Laura Linney
- Cinematography: Tom Stern
- Edited by: Joel Cox
- Music by: Clint Eastwood
- Production companies: Village Roadshow Pictures; Malpaso Productions; NPV Entertainment
- Distributed by: Warner Bros. Pictures
- Release dates: May 23, 2003 (Cannes); October 15, 2003 (United States)
- Running time: 137 minutes
- Country: United States
- Language: English
- Budget: $25–30 million
- Box office: $156.6 million

Mystic River is a 2003 American neo-noir mystery crime drama film. It was directed and co-produced by Clint Eastwood, and stars Sean Penn, Tim Robbins, Kevin Bacon, Laurence Fishburne, Marcia Gay Harden, and Laura Linney. The screenplay, written by Brian Helgeland, was based on the 2001 novel by Dennis Lehane. It is the first film in which Eastwood was credited as composer of the score.

The film was produced by Village Roadshow Pictures, Malpaso Productions and NPV Entertainment, premiered at the 2003 Cannes Film Festival on May 23, 2003, and was released on October 15, 2003 by Warner Bros. Pictures, and was a critical and commercial success. Mystic River was nominated for six awards at the 76th Academy Awards, including Best Picture, winning Best Actor for Penn and Best Supporting Actor for Robbins.

== Plot ==
In 1975, Irish-American neighborhood friends Jimmy Markum, Sean Devine, and Dave Boyle are playing street hockey in Charlestown, Boston. After the boys write their names in a patch of wet concrete on the sidewalk, two predators posing as police officers abduct Dave and rape him for four days until he escapes. One of the kidnappers dies before they can be caught, and the other is arrested and later dies by suicide in prison. 25 years later, Jimmy is an ex-convict and neighborhood convenience store owner; Sean is a detective with the Massachusetts State Police whose pregnant wife Lauren recently left him, and Dave is a blue-collar worker continually haunted by the abduction and rape he suffered. Jimmy and Dave are connected by marriage: Dave's wife Celeste and Jimmy's second wife Annabeth are cousins.

Jimmy's daughter from his first marriage, Katie, plans to run away to Las Vegas with Brendan Harris, a boy from a family Jimmy despises that she has been secretly dating. One night, Dave sees Katie and her friends at a local bar. That same night, she is murdered, and Dave comes home bloodied and injured, claiming he fought off a mugger and possibly killed him. Sean and his partner Whitey Powers investigate the murder, while a distraught Jimmy conducts a separate investigation using his neighborhood connections.

A witness statement suggests that Katie may have recognized her killer. The detectives understand that the gun used to kill her, a .38 Special revolver, was also used in a liquor store robbery in 1984 by "Just Ray" Harris, Brendan's father. Harris has been missing since 1989, but Brendan claims he still sends his family $500 monthly and feigns ignorance about Ray's gun. Whitey suspects Dave, who keeps changing the story about how his hand got injured. Dave's erratic behavior prompts Celeste to leave their home and tell Jimmy she suspects Dave is Katie's murderer.

Jimmy and his friends invite Dave to a local bar, get him drunk and confront him when he is about to vomit. Jimmy admits to Dave that he killed "Just Ray" for implicating him in the liquor store robbery, which resulted in his imprisonment. Dave reveals to Jimmy that he did kill someone the night of Katie's murder, not Katie herself but instead a child molester whom he found with a sex-trafficked child. Not believing him, Jimmy forces Dave to admit to Katie's murder before killing him and disposing of his body in the adjacent Mystic River. Meanwhile, after finding his father's gun missing, Brendan confronts his mute younger brother "Silent Ray" and his friend John O'Shea about Katie's murder. After beating the two boys, John pulls out Ray's gun and is about to shoot Brendan, but Sean and Whitey, having connected the teens to the murder, arrive in time to disarm and arrest John and Ray.

The next morning, Sean tells Jimmy that John and Silent Ray confessed to killing Katie as part of a prank gone wrong. Sean asks Jimmy if he has seen Dave, who is wanted for questioning in the murder of a known child molester. Jimmy does not answer, instead thanking Sean for finding Katie's killers. Sean reunites with Lauren after apologizing for pushing her away, while Jimmy confesses his actions to Annabeth. During a local parade, Sean points a finger gun at Jimmy, who shrugs it off.

== Cast ==
- Sean Penn as Jimmy Markum
  - Jason Kelly as Young Jimmy Markum
- Tim Robbins as Dave Boyle
  - Cameron Bowen as Young Dave Boyle
- Kevin Bacon as Detective Sean Devine
  - Connor Paolo as Young Sean Devine
- Laurence Fishburne as Detective Sergeant "Whitey" Powers
- Marcia Gay Harden as Celeste Samarco Boyle
- Laura Linney as Annabeth Markum
- Tom Guiry as Brendan Harris
- Spencer Treat Clark as Ray "Silent Ray" Harris Jr.
- Andrew Mackin as John O'Shea
- Emmy Rossum as Katherine "Katie" Markum
- Jenny O'Hara as Esther Harris
- Kevin Chapman as Val Savage
- Adam Nelson as Nick Savage
- Robert Wahlberg as Kevin Savage
- Cayden Boyd as Michael Boyle
- John Doman as The Driver
- Tori Davis as Lauren Devine
- Jonathan Togo as Pete
- Will Lyman as FBI Special Agent Birden
- Ari Graynor as Eve Pigeon
- Ken Cheeseman as Dave's Friend In Bar
- Michael McGovern as 1975 Reporter
- Kevin Conway (uncredited) as Theo Savage
- Eli Wallach (uncredited) as Mr. Loonie

== Production ==
Michael Keaton was originally cast in the role of Det. Sean Devine, and did several script readings with the cast, as well as his own research into the practices of the Massachusetts State Police. However, creative differences between Keaton and Clint Eastwood led to Keaton leaving the production. He was replaced by Kevin Bacon.

Principal photography took place on location in Boston.

== Reception ==
=== Critical response ===
On Rotten Tomatoes, Mystic River has an approval rating of 89% based on 204 reviews, with an average rating of 7.80/10. The site's critics consensus reads: "Anchored by the exceptional acting of its strong cast, Mystic River is a somber drama that unfolds in layers and conveys the tragedy of its story with visceral power." On Metacritic, the film has a weighted average score of 84 out of 100, based on reviews from 42 critics, indicating "universal acclaim". Audiences polled by CinemaScore gave the film an average grade of "B+" on an A+ to F scale.

Peter Travers of Rolling Stone wrote "Clint Eastwood pours everything he knows about directing into Mystic River. His film sneaks up, messes with your head, and then floors you. You can't shake it. It's that haunting, that hypnotic."

On September 8, 2003, David Edelstein wrote a long article for The New York Times with the headline: "Dirty Harry Wants to Say He's Sorry (Again)." The piece examines Mystic River in the context of Eastwood's entire oeuvre, praising his “evolution [into] cinema's […] sorrowful conscience”.

Reviewing the film for The New York Times on October 3, 2003, A.O. Scott wrote a long review of this "mighty" work, at one point observing: "Dave's abduction is an act of inexplicable, almost metaphysical evil, and this story of guilt, grief and vengeance grows out of it like a mass of dark weeds. At its starkest, the film, like the novel by Dennis Lehane on which it is based, is a parable of incurable trauma, in which violence begets more violence and the primal violation of innocence can never be set right. Mystic River is the rare American movie that aspires to—and achieves—the full weight and darkness of tragedy."

On October 12, 2003, The New York Times A. O. Scott wrote a piece headlined "Ms. Macbeth and her cousin: The women of Mystic River" which he opened with: "One of the most haunting scenes in Clint Eastwood's Mystic River—a film that consists almost entirely of haunting scenes—comes just before the end. The main dramatic action, we have every reason to suspect, is complete ... A long, climactic night of revelation and confrontation is over, and the weary streets of Boston are flooded with hard autumnal light. The break of day brings a new insight, one that has less to do with the facts of the story than with its meaning. All along, Mystic River has seemed, most obviously, to be about those three men ... But it turns out to be just as much about three (or more) damaged families, about the terror and mystery of marriage and about the fateful actions of two women."

In the New York Times, on June 8, 2004, anticipating the DVD and CD release, Dave Kehr praised the film as "a symphonic study in contrasting voices and values. Long fascinated by music as a subject, ... Mr. Eastwood here creates a genuinely musical style, using his performers like soloists, from Mr. Robbins's moody baritone to Mr. Penn's spiky soprano. Their individual arias are incorporated into a magnificent choral piece".

In 2025, it was one of the films voted for the "Readers' Choice" edition of The New York Times' list of "The 100 Best Movies of the 21st Century," finishing at number 318.

=== Box office ===
The film earned $156,822,020 worldwide with $90,135,191 in the United States and $66,686,829 in the international box office, on a $25–30 million budget.

=== Accolades ===
Award	Date of ceremony	Category	Recipient(s)	Result	Ref.
Academy Awards	February 29, 2004	Best Picture	Robert Lorenz, Judie G. Hoyt and Clint Eastwood	Nominated	
Academy Awards	February 29, 2004	Best Director	Clint Eastwood	Nominated	
Academy Awards	February 29, 2004	Best Actor	Sean Penn	Won	
Academy Awards	February 29, 2004	Best Supporting Actor	Tim Robbins	Won	
Academy Awards	February 29, 2004	Best Supporting Actress	Marcia Gay Harden	Nominated	
Academy Awards	February 29, 2004	Best Adapted Screenplay	Brian Helgeland	Nominated	
Actor Awards	February 22, 2004	Outstanding Performance by a Supporting Male Actor	Tim Robbins	Won	
Actor Awards	February 22, 2004	Outstanding Performance by a Male Actor	Sean Penn	Nominated	
Actor Awards	February 22, 2004	Outstanding Ensemble		Nominated	
American Cinema Editors	2004	Best Edited Feature Film – Dramatic	Joel Cox	Nominated	
Art Directors Guild	February 2004	Feature Film – Contemporary Film	Henry Bumstead and Jack G. Taylor Jr.	Won	
BAFTA Film Awards	February 15, 2004	Best Actor in a Leading Role	Sean Penn	Nominated	
BAFTA Film Awards	February 15, 2004	Best Actor in a Supporting Role	Tim Robbins	Nominated	
BAFTA Film Awards	February 15, 2004	Best Actress in a Supporting Role	Laura Linney	Nominated	
BAFTA Film Awards	February 15, 2004	Best Screenplay – Adapted	Brian Helgeland	Nominated	
Boston Society of Film Critics	December 14, 2003	Best Film		Won	
Boston Society of Film Critics	December 14, 2003	Best Ensemble		Won	
Cannes Film Festival	May 14 – 25, 2003	Palme d'Or	Clint Eastwood	Nominated	
Cannes Film Festival	May 14 – 25, 2003	Golden Coach	Clint Eastwood	Won	
Casting Society of America	October 2004	Feature Film		Won	
César Awards	February 21, 2004	Best Foreign Film		Won	
Critics' Choice Awards	January 10, 2004	Best Picture		Nominated	
Critics' Choice Awards	January 10, 2004	Best Director	Clint Eastwood	Nominated	
Critics' Choice Awards	January 10, 2004	Best Actor	Sean Penn	Won	
Critics' Choice Awards	January 10, 2004	Best Supporting Actress	Marcia Gay Harden	Nominated	
Critics' Choice Awards	January 10, 2004	Best Supporting Actor	Tim Robbins	Won	
Critics' Choice Awards	January 10, 2004	Best Ensemble		Nominated	
Critics' Choice Awards	January 10, 2004	Best Screenplay	Brian Helgeland	Nominated	
Critics' Choice Awards	January 10, 2004	Best Score	Clint Eastwood	Nominated	
Dallas-Fort Worth Film Critics Association	January 2004	Best Actor	Sean Penn	Won	
European Film Awards	6 December 2003	Best Non-European Film		Nominated	
Florida Film Critics Circle	January 2, 2004	Best Actor	Sean Penn	Won	
Florida Film Critics Circle	January 2, 2004	Best Supporting Actor	Tim Robbins	Won	
Golden Globes	January 25, 2004	Best Motion Picture – Drama		Nominated	
Golden Globes	January 25, 2004	Best Director – Motion Picture	Clint Eastwood	Nominated	
Golden Globes	January 25, 2004	Best Screenplay – Motion Picture	Brian Helgeland	Nominated	
Golden Globes	January 25, 2004	Best Actor in a Drama	Sean Penn	Won	
Golden Globes	January 25, 2004	Best Supporting Actor in a Motion Picture	Tim Robbins	Won	
London Film Critics Circle	February 11, 2004	Director of the Year	Clint Eastwood	Won	
London Film Critics Circle	February 11, 2004	Actor of the Year	Sean Penn	Won	
National Board of Review	December 3, 2003	Best Film		Won	
National Board of Review	December 3, 2003	Best Actor	Sean Penn	Won	
National Society of Film Critics	January 3, 2004	Best Film		2nd Place	
National Society of Film Critics	January 3, 2004	Best Director	Clint Eastwood	Won	
National Society of Film Critics	January 3, 2004	Best Actor	Sean Penn	2nd Place	
National Society of Film Critics	January 3, 2004	Best Supporting Actor	Tim Robbins	2nd Place	
National Society of Film Critics	January 3, 2004	Best Screenplay	Brian Helgeland	2nd Place	
Satellite Awards	January 23, 2004	Best Drama Film		Nominated	
Satellite Awards	January 23, 2004	Best Director	Clint Eastwood	Nominated	
Satellite Awards	January 23, 2004	Best Actor – Drama	Sean Penn	Won	
Satellite Awards	January 23, 2004	Best Supporting Actress – Drama	Marcia Gay Harden	Nominated	
Satellite Awards	January 23, 2004	Best Adapted Screenplay	Brian Helgeland	Won	
Satellite Awards	January 23, 2004	Best Cinematography	Tom Stern	Nominated	
Satellite Awards	January 23, 2004	Best Editing	Joel Cox	Nominated	
Satellite Awards	January 23, 2004	Best Sound	Alan Robert Murray and Bub Asman	Nominated	
Vancouver Film Critics Circle	February 2, 2004	Best Actor	Sean Penn	Won	
Writers Guild of America	February 21, 2004	Best Adapted Screenplay	Brian Helgeland	Nominated	

== Bibliography ==
- Eliot, Marc (2009). American Rebel: The Life of Clint Eastwood. Harmony Books. ISBN 978-0-307-33688-0.
- Hughes, Howard (2009). Aim for the Heart: The Films of Clint Eastwood. London: I.B. Tauris. ISBN 978-1-84511-902-7.
- Ostermann, Eberhard (2007). "Mystic River Oder Die Abwesenheit Des Vaters". Die Filmerzählung: acht exemplarische Analysen. Munich: Fink. pp. 29–43. ISBN 978-3-7705-4562-9.
