= Darkness, Take My Hand =

1996 novel by Dennis Lehane

- First edition
- Author: Dennis Lehane
- Language: English
- Series: Kenzie and Gennaro
- Genre: Crime fiction
- Publisher: William Morrow & Co
- Publication date: 1996
- Publication place: United States
- Media type: Hardcover
- Pages: 336
- ISBN: 0-688-14380-6
- Dewey Decimal: 813/.54 20
- LC Class: PS3562.E426 D37 1996
- Preceded by: A Drink Before the War
- Followed by: Sacred

Darkness, Take My Hand (1996) is the second book in the Kenzie/Gennaro series by Dennis Lehane.

The novel was a finalist for the 1997 Dilys Award.

== Reception ==
Darkness, Take My Hand received starred reviews from Booklist and Publishers Weekly.

Publishers Weekly called the novel "outstanding", noting that "the story is densely peopled with multidimensional characters; there are no forgettable, walk-on roles on Lehane's stage". They further stated, "Lehane's voice, original, haunting and straight from the heart, places him among that top rank of stylists who enrich the modern mystery novel".

Kirkus Reviews wrote, "Though there's an unseemly lack of subtlety to Lehane's sex scenes and violent set pieces, the passion of his neighborhood nightmare can hardly be denied. And he's created a villain who's both surprising and grimly fascinating: The kind of figure one hates but can't stop reading about."
