= Small Mercies (novel) =

2023 novel by Dennis Lehane

- First edition cover
- Author: Dennis Lehane
- Audio read by: Robin Miles
- Cover artist: Milan Bozic (design); Eugene Richards (photograph)
- Language: English
- Genre: Mystery/crime
- Publisher: Harper
- Publication date: April 25, 2023
- Publication place: United States
- Media type: Print (hardcover and paperback), e-book, audiobook
- Pages: 299 pp.
- ISBN: 978-0-06-212948-2 (First edition hardcover)
- Dewey Decimal: 813/.54
- LC Class: PS3562.E426 S63 2023

Small Mercies is a 2023 detective-mystery novel by American author Dennis Lehane. The novel is set in Boston in summer 1974, during the tense days approaching the start of the school year at the height of the Boston busing crisis. The story encompasses Irish Mob conflicts, a missing teenaged white girl, and a Black man's murder. The book's cover features a photograph taken by Eugene Richards at a protest outside South Boston High School in September 1974. Lehane has signaled that the novel "may be his last."

== Critical reception ==
Small Mercies was well received by critics. The New York Times emphasized the author's searing portrayal of bigotry in 1974 Boston: "Lehane spares nothing and no one in his crackerjack new novel, Small Mercies. ... It zeros in on bigotry that ought to feel dated but doesn't." NPR praised the novel's timeliness and its exploration of racism, noting, "At once a crime novel, a deep, unflinching look at racism, and a heart-wrenching story about a mother who has lost everything, this narrative delves into life in the projects at a time when the city of Boston struggled with the desegregation of its public school system." Kirkus called the book "a taut, gripping mystery [that] is also a novel of soul-searching, for the author and reader alike." In The New Yorker, Laura Miller favorably compared it to Mystic River (2001), saying that both novels depict "Lehane's tragic vision of Boston's working-class enclaves" and "land like a fist to the solar plexus."

== Television adaptation ==
In January 2023, Apple TV+ acquired the screen rights to the book as part of an exclusive overall deal with Lehane. He is tasked with creating a drama series based on Small Mercies, and will also serve as executive producer alongside Bradley Thomas, Kary Antholis and Richard Plepler.
