= Coronado: Stories =

Novel by Dennis Lehane

- First edition
- Author: Dennis Lehane
- Language: English
- Publisher: William Morrow
- Publication date: Aug 2006
- Publication place: United States
- Media type: Print (hardback & paperback)
- Pages: 240 pp
- ISBN: 0-06-113967-X
- Preceded by: Shutter Island
- Followed by: The Given Day

Coronado: Stories is a collection of five short stories and a play by the American author Dennis Lehane. "Until Gwen", the collection's fifth story, was published in the June 2004 edition of The Atlantic prior to its inclusion in Coronado.

== Contents ==
- "Running Out of Dog"
- "ICU"
- "Gone Down to Corpus"
- "Mushrooms"
- "Until Gwen"
