= Coronado (surname) =

Coronado is a Spanish surname derived from the village of Cornado, near A Coruña, Galicia.

== People with the name ==
- Francisco Vásquez de Coronado (1510–1554), Spanish explorer often referred to simply as "Coronado"
- Abraham Coronado (born 1992), Mexican footballer
- Carolina Coronado (1820–1911), Spanish author
- Coronado Chávez (1807–1881), President of Honduras
- Evaristo Coronado (born 1960), Costa Rican footballer
- Humberto Aguilar Coronado (born 1963), Mexican politician
- Ingrid Coronado (born 1974), Mexican entertainer
- José Coronado (born 1957), Spanish actor
- Juan Coronado (born 1983), Dominican basketball player
- Luis Coronado (born 1969), Guatemalan weightlifter
- Manuel Martinez Coronado (fl. 1995–1998), Guatemalan farmer and mass murderer
- Marcelina Orta Coronado (born 1968), Mexican politician
- Miguel Coronado (born 1987), Chilean footballer
- Rod Coronado (born 1966), Native American activist
- Sergio Coronado (born 1970), French politician

== See also ==
- Coronado (disambiguation)
