= Dennis Lehane =

American novelist (born 1965)

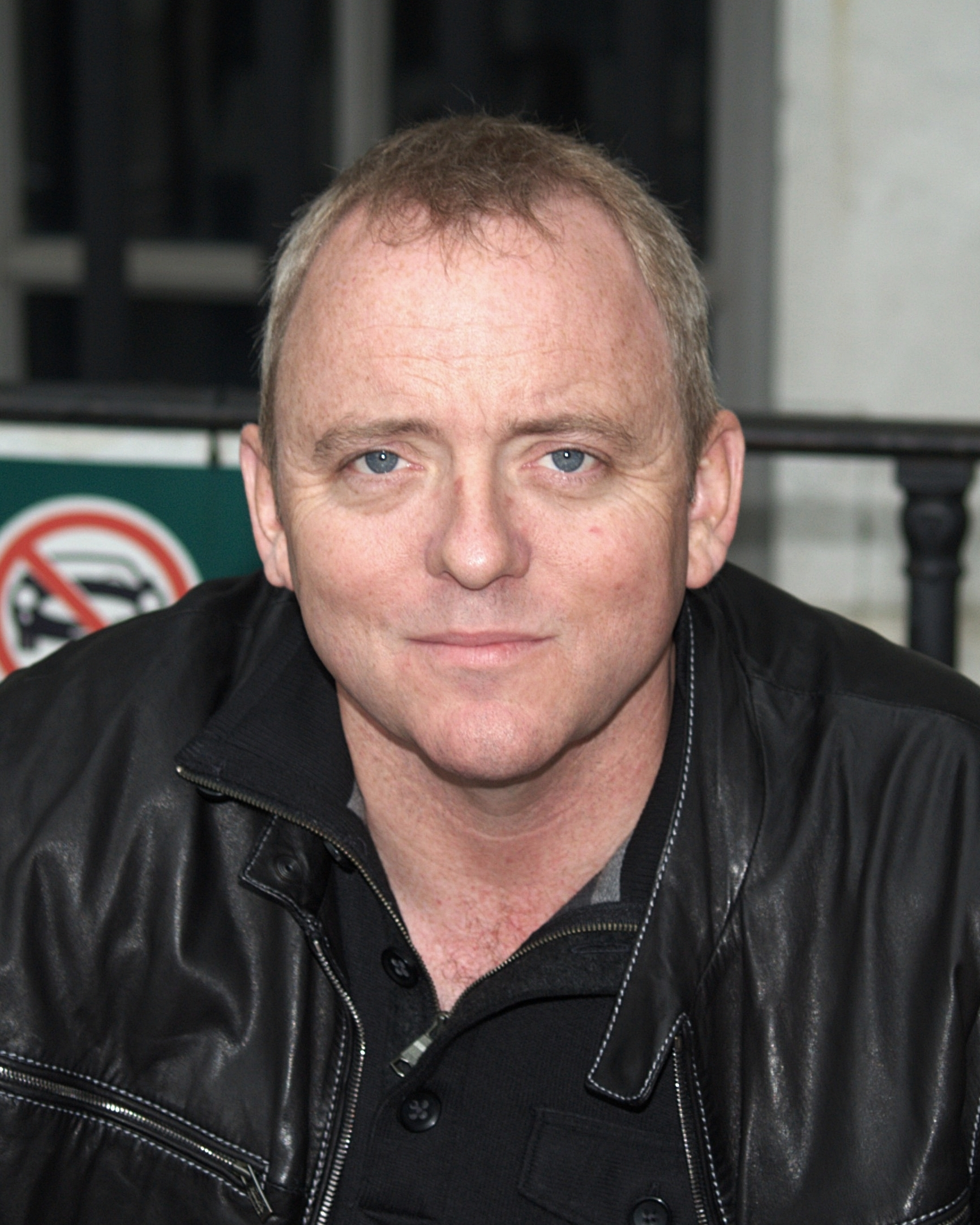
- Lehane in 2010
- Born: August 4, 1965 (age 61); Boston, Massachusetts, U.S.
- Education: Eckerd College; Florida International University
- Occupations: Novelist, screenwriter
- Spouse: Chisa Lehane
- Children: 2
- Writing career
- Genres: Crime fiction, mystery fiction
- Website: www.dennislehane.com

Dennis Lehane (/ləˈheɪn/ lə-HAYN; born August 4, 1965) is an American author and screenwriter. He has published more than a dozen novels; the first several were a series of mysteries featuring recurring characters, including A Drink Before the War (1994). Four of his novels have been adapted into films of the same name: Clint Eastwood's Mystic River (2003), Martin Scorsese's Shutter Island (2010), and Gone Baby Gone (2007) and Live by Night (2016), both directed by Ben Affleck. His short story "Animal Rescue" was also adapted into the 2014 film The Drop, noted for being the final film role for actor James Gandolfini.

== Early life and education ==
Lehane was born and raised in the Dorchester neighborhood of Boston, Massachusetts, United States. He lived in the Boston area most of his life, where he sets most of his books. He spent summers on Fieldston Beach in Marshfield. Lehane is the youngest of five children. His father was a foreman for Sears & Roebuck, and his mother worked in a Boston public school cafeteria. Both of his parents emigrated from Ireland. Lehane is a graduate of Eckerd College in St. Petersburg, Florida.

His brother, Gerry Lehane, who is two and a half years older than Dennis, trained at the Trinity Repertory Company in Providence and became an actor in New York in 1990. Gerry is a member of the Invisible City Theatre Company.

He is a graduate of Boston College High School (a Jesuit prep school), Eckerd College (where he found his passion for writing), and the graduate program in creative writing at Florida International University in Miami, Florida.

== Career ==
=== Literary career ===
Lehane's first novel, A Drink Before the War (1994), which introduced the recurring characters Patrick Kenzie and Angela Gennaro, won the 1995 Shamus Award for Best First P.I. Novel. The fourth novel in the series, Gone, Baby, Gone, was adapted into a film of the same title in 2007; it was directed by Ben Affleck and starred Casey Affleck and Michelle Monaghan as Kenzie and Gennaro. Commenting on the movie after a sneak peek, Lehane said: "I saw the movie and it's terrific, I wasn't gonna say anything if I didn't like it but it's really terrific." Reportedly, Lehane "has never wanted to write the screenplays for the films [based on his own books], because he says he has 'no desire to operate on my own child.'"

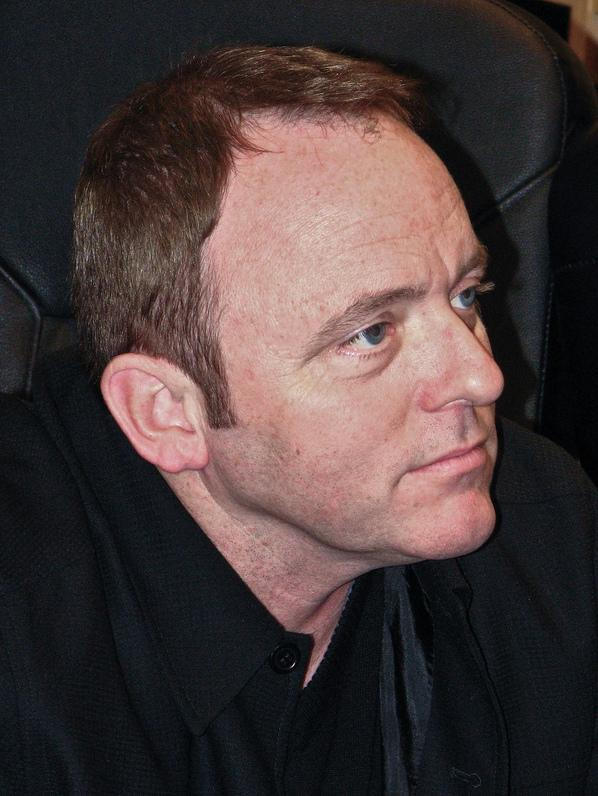
Lehane at a book signing in February 2009

Lehane's novel Mystic River was adapted into a film in 2003; also called Mystic River and directed by Clint Eastwood, it starred Sean Penn, Tim Robbins, and Kevin Bacon. Lehane can be briefly seen waving from a car in the parade scene at the end of the film. The novel itself was a finalist for the PEN/Winship Award and won the Anthony Award and the Barry Award for Best Novel, the Massachusetts Book Award in Fiction, and France's Prix Mystère de la critique.

Lehane's first play, Coronado, debuted in New York in December 2005, produced by Invisible City Theater Company. The play had its regional premiere at American Stage in St. Petersburg in April 2006 and its Midwest premiere in the fall of 2007 with Steep Theatre Company in Chicago. Coronado is based on his acclaimed short story "Until Gwen", which was originally published in The Atlantic Monthly and was selected for both The Best American Short Stories and The Best Mystery Short Stories of 2005.

Lehane described working on his historical novel, The Given Day, as "a five- or six-year project." the novel opens in 1918 and encompasses the 1919 Boston Police Strike and its aftermath. According to Lehane, "The strike changed everything. It had a big effect on the unionization movement, and Prohibition came on the heels of that, then Calvin Coolidge promising to break the unions. That's all linked to what's going on now.". While Lehane's epic novel centers on the 1919 Boston police strike, it contains a national sweep and may be the first of a trilogy or perhaps a four-book series. Lehane called the novel his "great white whale" and said that when he finally finished it, he would "either write a sequel—or take a break from the cops and return to Patrick and Angie." The novel was published in October 2008.

On October 22, 2007, Paramount Pictures announced that it had optioned Shutter Island with Martin Scorsese attached as director. The Laeta Kalogridis-scripted adaptation has Leonardo DiCaprio playing U.S. Marshal Teddy Daniels, "who is investigating the disappearance of a murderess who escaped from a hospital for the criminally insane and is presumed to be hiding on the remote Shutter Island." Mark Ruffalo plays U.S. Marshal Chuck Aule. Production started in March 2008; Shutter Island was released on February 19, 2010.

In 2010 Lehane published Moonlight Mile, his sixth book in the Patrick Kenzie and Angela Gennaro series, and his first of that genre in 11 years. He published World Gone By in March 2015.

Lehane was appointed to the board of trustees of the Boston Public Library by Mayor Thomas Menino in December 2011.

Lehane's Small Mercies received praise from Richard Russo, who said: "Think of all your favorite hard-boiled authors (Hammett? Chandler? Ross Macdonald? Robert Parker?) and their tough guy heroes (Spade? Marlowe? Lew Archer? Spenser?). Not one of them could take Lehane's Mary Pat in a fair fight, and they wouldn't last a day in his Southie."

Lehane occasionally made guest appearances as himself in the ABC comedy/drama TV series Castle.

=== Teaching career ===
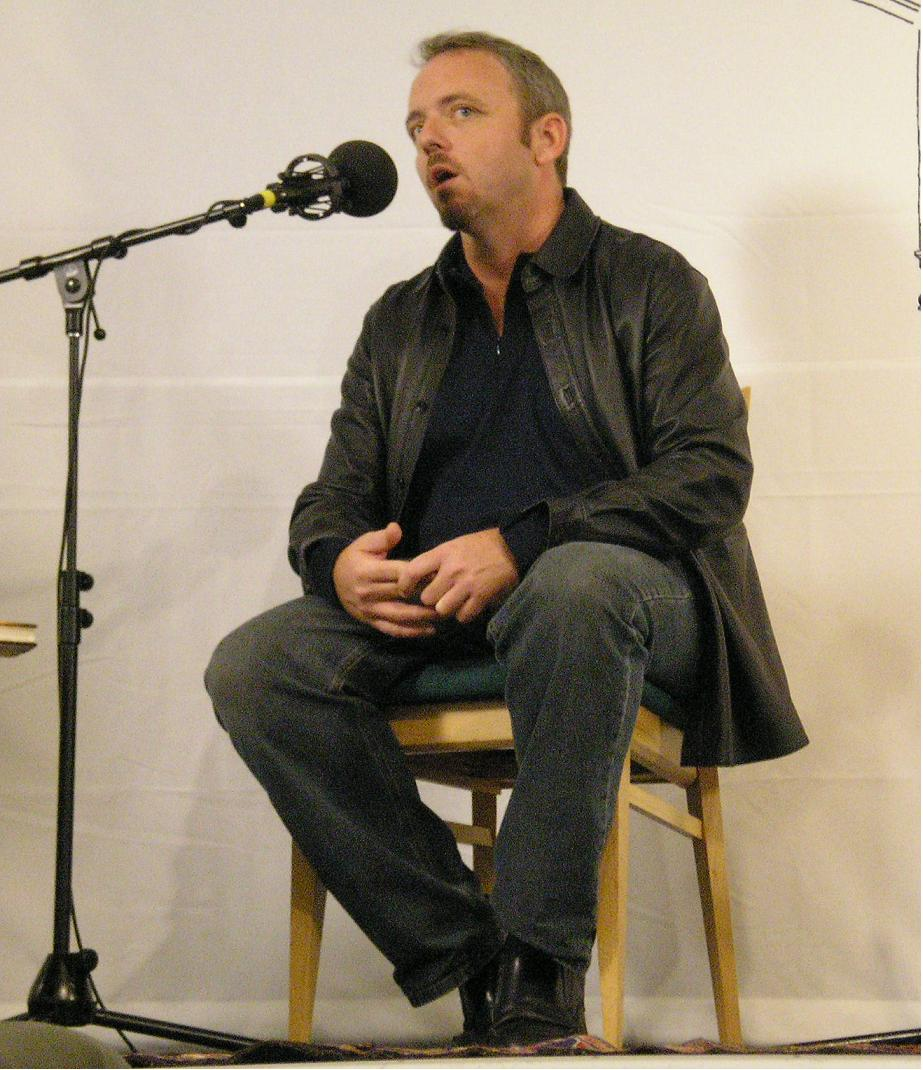
Lehane at Barnes & Noble Union Square, New York City, August 15, 2006

Since becoming a literary success, Lehane has taught at several colleges. He taught fiction writing and serves as a member of the board of directors for the Solstice Low-Residency MFA Program at Pine Manor College in Chestnut Hill, Massachusetts. He has also taught advanced fiction writing at Harvard University.

In May 2005, Lehane was presented with an honorary Doctor of Humane Letters degree from Eckerd College and was appointed to Eckerd's board of trustees later that year. As of June 2006, he was living temporarily in St. Petersburg, Florida, and teaching as writer-in-residence at Eckerd (usually during the spring semester), where he also co-directs the Writers in Paradise conference each January.

=== Film career ===
Lehane wrote and directed an independent film called Neighborhoods in the mid-1990s. Later described as similar to Good Will Hunting, it was set in Boston's working class areas like Southie and Dorchester. Its production ended in 1996, more than a year before the better-known Good Will Hunting.

Lehane joined the writing staff of the HBO drama series The Wire for the third season in 2004. Lehane wrote the teleplay for the episode "Dead Soldiers" from a story by series creator and executive producer David Simon. Lehane made a cameo appearance in the third-season episode, "Middle Ground," as Sullivan, an officer in charge of special equipment. Lehane has commented that he was impressed by the show's creators (David Simon and Ed Burns) having such an ear for authentic street slang. Lehane returned as a writer for the fourth season in 2006 and wrote the teleplay for the episode "Refugees," from a story he co-wrote with producer Ed Burns. Lehane and the writing staff won the Writers Guild of America (WGA) Award for Best Dramatic Series at the February 2008 ceremony and the 2007 Edgar Award for Best Television Feature/Mini-Series Teleplay for their work on the fourth season. Lehane served as a writer for the fifth and final season in 2008 and was credited with the episode "Clarifications". He and the writing staff were nominated for the WGA Award for Best Dramatic Series again at the February 2009 ceremony for their work on the fifth season but Mad Men won the award.

He served as an executive producer for Shutter Island. On November 27, 2012, The Boston Herald reported that Lehane would join the writing staff of HBO's Boardwalk Empire as a writer and a creative consultant. He will consult with showrunner Terence Winter on the outline of the fourth season of the show, and he confirmed that he would write at least one episode.

Lehane wrote his first film screenplay, The Drop, as an adaptation of his short story "Animal Rescue". The film stars Tom Hardy, Noomi Rapace, and James Gandolfini (in his final film performance). Released September 12, 2014, the movie received positive reviews, particularly for its "smartly written script." In 2013 Lehane was contracted to write a screenplay, Silk Road, about the online black market. That same year he was attached to adapt the script for the remake of the critically acclaimed French film A Prophet, a prison drama.

== Personal life ==
Lehane is married to Chisa Lehane. He has two children from a previous marriage and lives in southern California.

== Works ==
=== Published works ===
==== Novels ====
Kenzie & Gennaro series:

1. A Drink Before the War (1994). ISBN 015100093X
2. Darkness, Take My Hand (1996). ISBN 0688143806
3. Sacred (1997). ISBN 0688143814
4. Gone, Baby, Gone (1998). ISBN 0688153321
5. Prayers for Rain (1999). ISBN 068815333X
6. Moonlight Mile (2010). ISBN 0061836923

Coughlin series:

1. The Given Day (2008). ISBN 978-0688163181
2. Live by Night (2012). ISBN 978-0060004873
3. World Gone By (2015). ISBN 978-0060004903

Stand-alones:

- Mystic River (2001). ISBN 0688163165
- Shutter Island (2003). ISBN 0688163173
- Coronado: Stories (2006). ISBN 978-0061139673
- The Drop (2014). ISBN 978-0062365446
- Since We Fell (2017). ISBN 978-1408708330
- Small Mercies (2023). ISBN 978-0-06-212948-2

==== Short stories ====
- "Until Gwen" (The Atlantic, June 2004)
- "Animal Rescue" (2009)
- "Red Eye" – in "FaceOff" (2014), co-written with Michael Connelly; a Harry Bosch story, with Patrick Kenzie

=== Filmography ===
- The Wire (2002 TV series) writer
  - Episode 3.03 "Dead Soldiers" (2004) story and teleplay
  - Episode 3.11 "Middle Ground" (2004) actor
  - Episode 4.04 "Refugees" (2006) story and teleplay
  - Episode 5.08 "Clarifications" (2008) story and teleplay
- Shutter Island (2010) executive producer
- Castle (2009) actor, as himself
  - Episode 3.21 "The Dead Pool" (2011)
- Boardwalk Empire (2013 TV series) writer; creative consultant
  - Episode 4.02 "Resignation" (2013)
- The Drop (2014) screenwriter, based on his own short story "Animal Rescue"
- Mr. Mercedes (2017 TV series) writer; consulting producer
  - Episode 1.04 "Gods Who Fall" (2017)
  - Episode 1.06 "People in the Rain" (2017)
  - Episode 1.07 "Willow Lake" (2017)
  - Episode 1.10 "Jibber-Jibber Chicken Dinner" (2017)
  - Episode 2.01 "Missed You" (2018)
  - Episode 2.07 "Fell On Black Days" (2018, with Samantha Stratton & Mike Batistick)
  - Episode 2.09 "Walk Like a Man" (2018, with David E. Kelley)
- The Outsider (2020 miniseries) writer
  - Episode 1.07 "In the Pines, In the Pines" (2020)
  - Episode 1.09 "Tigers and Bears" (2020)
- Black Bird (2022 miniseries) developer and writer
- Smoke (2025 miniseries) developer and writer

== Awards and nominations ==
Year	Nominated work	Award	Category	Result
2003	Mystic River	USC Scripter Awards		Won^{[A]}
2004	Mystic River	Edgar Awards	Best Motion Picture Screenplay	Nominated^{[B]}
2007	The Wire	Edgar Awards	Best TV Feature or Mini-Series Teleplay	Won^{[C]}
2007	The Wire	WGA Awards	Outstanding Dramatic Series	Won^{[D]}
2008	The Wire	WGA Awards	Outstanding Dramatic Series	Nominated^{[E]}
2010	Animal Rescue	Edgar Awards	Best Short Story	Nominated
2013	Live by Night	Edgar Awards	Best Novel	Won
2013	Boardwalk Empire	OFTA Awards	Best Writing in a Drama Series	Nominated^{[F]}
Note: Awards are listed in order of the effective years, annual ceremonies are usually held the following.

Notes

- A Shared with Brian Helgeland, while tied with Gary Ross and Laura Hillenbrand for Seabiscuit
- B Also shared with Helgeland.
- C Shared with Ed Burns, Kia Corthron, David Mills, Eric Overmyer, George Pelecanos, Richard Price, David Simon and William F. Zorzi.
- D Shared with Burns, Chris Collins, Corthron, Mills, Overmyer, Pelecanos, Price, Simon and Zorzi.
- E Also shared with Burns, Collins, Mills, Pelecanos, Price, Simon and Zorzi.
- F Shared with Terence Winter, Nelson Johnson, Howard Korder, Steve Kornacki, Cristine Chambers, David Flebotte, David M. Matthews, David Stenn, and Jennifer Ames.

He has won other professional awards and honorary degrees: In Spring 2009, Lehane received the Joseph E. Connor Award and was made an honorary brother of the Phi Alpha Tau professional fraternity at Emerson College in Boston, Massachusetts. Other brothers and Connor Award recipients include Robert Frost, Elia Kazan, Jack Lemmon, Red Skelton, Edward R. Murrow, Yul Brynner, and Walter Cronkite. Also in Spring 2009, Lehane presented the commencement speech at Emmanuel College in Boston, Massachusetts, and was awarded an honorary degree. On October 6, 2015, Lehane won a spot in Best American Mystery Stories.

== Novelizations ==
- Novel The Drop, novelization of film The Drop (2014)

== Adaptations ==
- Mystic River (2003), film directed by Clint Eastwood, based on novel Mystic River
- Gone Baby Gone (2007), film directed by Ben Affleck, based on novel Gone, Baby, Gone
- Shutter Island (2010), film directed by Martin Scorsese, based on novel Shutter Island
- The Drop (2014), film directed by Michaël R. Roskam, based on short story "Animal Rescue"
- Live by Night (2016), film directed by Ben Affleck, based on novel Live by Night
- Gone Baby Gone (2018), unreleased telefilm directed by Phillip Noyce, based on novel Gone, Baby, Gone
