= Coronato =

Coronato is a surname. Notable people with the surname include:

- Bob Coronato (born 1970), American painter and printmaker
- José Francisco Coronato Rodríguez (born 1953), Mexican politician and lawyer
- Matt Coronato (born 2002), American ice hockey player
