= A Drink Before the War =

1994 novel by Dennis Lehane

- First edition cover
- Author: Dennis Lehane
- Language: English
- Series: Kenzie and Gennaro
- Genre: Crime
- Publisher: Harcourt
- Publication date: November 1994
- Publication place: United States
- Media type: Print (hardback & paperback)
- Pages: 267 pp
- ISBN: 0-15-100093-X
- Followed by: Darkness, Take My Hand

A Drink Before the War is a crime novel by American writer Dennis Lehane, published in 1994. It was his debut novel. It is the first book in a series focusing on Boston-based private investigators Patrick Kenzie and Angela Gennaro.

== Plot summary ==
Boston private detectives Patrick Kenzie and Angela Gennaro are hired by Massachusetts State Senate President Sterling Mulkern, State Representative Jim Vurnan, and State Senator Brian Paulson to recover stolen documents from Paulson's former cleaning lady, Jenna Angeline.

Tracking Angeline to her sister Simone's house outside Boston, they learn that the documents are in a safe deposit box at a nearby bank. Kenzie escorts Angeline to the bank, where she gives him a single photo before being gunned down by an enforcer for notorious drug dealer and pimp Marion Socia. The photo shows Socia with Paulson, implying that he was one of the pimp's clients. Kenzie and Gennaro realize that Angeline has hidden the remaining documents in a different location.

The ensuing investigation takes the detectives from swanky Boston hotels to housing projects in the poorest ghettos of Dorchester. Kenzie wrestles with problems of race, class, urban violence, corruption, abuse, and love. A war erupts between Socia and his teenage son Roland, culminating in the bloodiest night of gang violence in Boston history. A "street terrorism" bill written and sponsored by Paulson that would have curbed the violence is suspiciously stalled before coming to a vote on the weekend of July 4th. All these events are connected to the photographs, and as they pursue the evidence, Kenzie and Gennaro find themselves hunted by both sides.

Eventually the detectives find the photos and learn that Socia prostituted Roland to Paulson years ago; he had sent the photos in an attempt to blackmail Paulson into dropping his support for the bill and Angeline took them after finding him passed out drunk, hoping to finally "get something for herself" after a lifetime of exploitation. Roland gains the upper hand in the war, and Socia demands the pictures in a futile attempt to obtain leverage over his son. Kenzie and Gennaro instead murder Socia in cold blood at the meeting site after seeing that he has no remorse for the lives he's ruined.

Kenzie arranges for his friend, journalist Ritchie Colgan, to publish articles exposing Paulson's molestation after tricking Mulkern into signing a check for payment of services that could be used as evidence of him protecting Paulson, thus shielding him and Gennaro from any future retaliation. Gennaro beats up her abusive husband Phil and leaves him for good, moving in with Kenzie. Roland meets with the duo and assures them that, since Kenzie obscured his face in the photos provided to Colgan, he considers the business between them to be settled and will thus leave them in peace.

== Major themes ==
Themes of the novel include racial and class warfare, the personal effects of blue-collar bitterness among both white and black working-class individuals, and the emotional damage that can be inflicted by father figures.

== Critical reception ==
The New York Times described the book as somewhat clichéd but praised the honest approach to racial and class warfare. They also felt that the seriousness of the novel's themes made a jarring contrast with the flippancy of the detective characters.

== Awards and nominations ==
Dennis Lehane received a Shamus Award for Best First Novel for the book.
