= Gianfranco Terrin =

Italian actor

- Born: May 16, 1985 (age 41); Naples, Italy
- Occupations: Actor and producer
- Years active: 1995–present

Gianfranco Terrin is an Italian film and stage actor born in Naples, Italy. He first became known for hosting the TV mini-series Movie Surfers airing on the Disney Channel.

== Life and career ==
He grew up in Pozzuoli, where at the age of ten, director Giuseppe M. Gaudino chose him to play a street urchin in Round the Moons between Earth and See. Soon after, He was in the Italian TV Series Un posto al sole and in the feature film Rosa Funzeca directed by Aurelio Grimaldi. He trained in Italy with Actress Fioretta Mari and moved to Los Angeles, where he was awarded a full scholarship for the Lee Strasberg Institute. He was the main host of the Disney Channel mini TV series Movie Surfers and starred in several feature films, including Bobby Fischer Live, Marlon Brando Unauthorized, and Mont Reve. He filmed a commercial for Fastweb, and played the lead role of Leonard in Il Castello di Azzurrina. In 2012, he produced and directed Hysteria 2012, a short documentary nominated at the California International Short Festival. He played Adam in the Italian version of La Forma delle Cose (The Shape of Things) at Teatro Brancaccino in Rome. He appeared in CBS's Criminal Minds Beyond Borders. He played Italian gangster Carmine Parone in the 2016 crime drama Live by Night, and Z'Luigino in the Francis Ford Coppola experimental film project Distant Vision (2015). He has latest appeared in the TV series Carthago a WW2 period drama, that is based on a true story and nominated as the Best Series Award at Cannes Film Festival.

== Filmography ==
=== Film ===
Year	Title	Role	Notes
1997	Round the Moons Between Earth and Sea	Banda di Gennarino	
2002	Rosa Funzeca	Gianfranco	
2002	The Gift	Gian	Short
2009	Bobby Fischer Live	Luigi Italian Reporter	
2009	The Pick Up	Frank	Short
2010	Brando Unauthorized	Jean Paul	
2012	Striker	Johnny G	
2012	Mont Rêve	Riccardo Bartolo	Short
2012	Hysteria	Milky	Short
2015	The Elevator	Deliveryman	
2015	Ana Maria in Novela Land	Dancer #2	
2016	Distant Vision	Z'Luigino	
2016	Live by Night	Carmine	
2017	Fairies	Richard Grey	Short
2023	Azzurrina	Leonard	
2025	Thunderbolts*	Nico	

=== TV ===
Year	Title	Role	Notes
2002	Un posto al sole	Lucio Finaturio	Episode #6.32
2017	Criminal Minds: Beyond Borders	Assistente M.L. Marco Betti	Episode: "II Mostro"
2022–23	Carthago	Michele	7 episodes
2023	Citadel	Italian Doctor	Episode: "The Human Enigma"
