= Muna (2019 film) =

2019 Nigerian action crime drama film by Kevin Nwankwor

- Film poster
- Directed by: Kevin Nwankwor
- Screenplay by: Liam Parry; Joe Leone; Kevin Nwankwor
- Story by: Unoma Nwankwor
- Produced by: Emmanuel Ojeah; Unoma Nwankwor
- Starring: Adesua Etomi; Massi Furlan; Onyeka Onwenu
- Production company: KevStel Productions
- Distributed by: Silverbird Film Distribution
- Release date: 13 December 2019
- Running time: 113 minutes
- Countries: Nigeria; USA
- Language: English
- Box office: ₦30.4million

Muna is a 2019 action crime drama film directed by Kevin Nwankwor. The film stars Adesua Etomi in the title role. The film was predominantly shot in both Nigeria and United States. The cast consisted of notable actors from Nollywood and Hollywood. It was released on 13 December 2019 in Nigeria, Liberia and Ghana and received positive reviews from critics while also performing well at the box office. The film was regarded as one of the most anticipated films before its release.

== Cast ==
- Adesua Etomi as Muna
- Adam Huss as Tony
- Massi Furlan as Adrian
- Cesar D’ La Torre as Alberto
- Myles Cranford as Daniel
- Robert Miano as Luca
- Falz as himself (cameo appearance)
- Ebele Okaro
- Onyeka Onwenu
- Sharon Ifedi
- Michael Cavalieri as Varrick
- Jonny Williams
- Mayling Ng as Brunildaa
- Camille Winbush as Mindy
- Steve Wilder as Detective Oswald

== Synopsis ==
The story revolves around a spirited girl Muna raised by her grandmother; who is the last surviving member in the family. Muna's desire to give a better life to herself and her grandmother in the land of milk and honey leads to shady characters that will change the trajectory.

== Production ==
The pictures featuring Adesua Etomi-Wellington portraying the character of Muna practicing martial arts went viral on her Instagram account page in July 2017. Rapper Falz featured in a cameo appearance. The portions of the film were mostly shot in California and Los Angeles and the film shooting was concluded in March 2017. However the film release was delayed for further two years before finally being released on 13 December 2019. The official trailer of the film was unveiled on 3 June 2019.

== Box office ==
The film grossed 10.9 million in its first two days since its theatrical release. The film collected a total of ₦30.4million at the box office.
