= Coronado High School =

Coronado High School is the name of several high schools in the United States of America, including:

- Coronado High School (Arizona), located in Scottsdale, Arizona
- Coronado High School (California), located in Coronado, California
- Coronado High School (Colorado), located in Colorado Springs, Colorado
- Coronado High School (Nevada), located in Henderson, Nevada
- Coronado High School (El Paso, Texas), located in El Paso, Texas
- Coronado High School (Lubbock, Texas), located in Lubbock, Texas
