= Marlin Darrah =

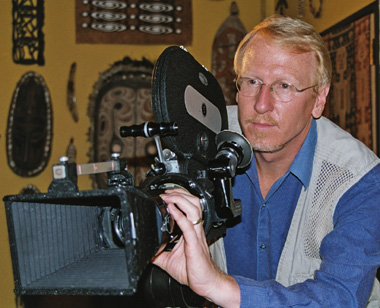
- Occupation: Filmmaker

Marlin Darrah is the executive director of International Film & Video (IFV), a production company based in the United States. For his documentary work in Portugal and in other locations throughout the world, Darrah was honored with a knighthood in the Royal House of Portugal.

From 1976 through 2025, Darrah produced several dozen documentaries, travel-adventure films and feature films in more than 140 countries.

Darrah's company, IFV, maintains a stock library of original worldwide footage. Darrah's international 4K and HD shots have been purchased by dozens of producers in the television industry and by educational organizations for either limited-use or royalty-free licensing purposes.

== Production summary ==
Marathon, Darrah's first 16mm film, covered the 1976 Olympic Trials Marathon in Eugene, Oregon. The film was licensed and distributed nationally from 1977 to 1980 by Runner's World magazine in San Francisco. For three years, Marlin produced several films for the magazine, one of which, Moments of the Runner, was a finalist in the 1979 American Film Festival in NYC. For that film, Darrah shot footage throughout the U.S., as well as in Moscow, and at the site of the first Olympic Games in Greece.

In 1977, Darrah produced and shot Nike, Inc.'s first film, a 23-minute program called Running Peace. From 1982 to 2006, Darrah shot and directed documentaries and travel programs in more than 140 countries worldwide. His shots or programs have been sold or shown by National Geographic Society, PBS, CBS, NBC, ABC, CNN, Discovery Channel, and History Channel. Darrah made promotional travel video programs for private companies.

The University of Virginia's Semester at Sea study-abroad program contracted Darrah from 1989 through 2008 to produce approximately 40 two-hour video programs, documenting the around-the-world voyages of Semester at Sea. More than 100,000 of Darrah's Semester at Sea DVDs were distributed to students and families throughout the U.S.

In 2000, Darrah completed a 7-part, 7-hour DVD series entitled World's Most Exotic Places. Profiled in that DVD series are Central and South America, New Guinea, Asia, the Middle East, Africa and Europe. EDI/Marathon, Inc. of Oregon distributed 20,000+ copies of the series throughout North America to libraries and through direct DVD sales to the public.

In 2002, Darrah joined fellow filmmaker Gregory Ritchie and traveled to NW Pakistan for five weeks to direct and shoot a documentary about the challenging lives of the Pashtun villagers living in the Tribal Zone along the border of Afghanistan and Pakistan. The 55-minute documentary, In the Shadow of bin Laden, was selected for screenings at several film festivals and has been shown in theaters throughout the United States.

Darrah also co-wrote, directed, and co-produced in Southeast Asia a dramatic feature-length movie, Monsoon Wife. The movie was completed in September 2002. The movie is about love, betrayal, and redemption in exotic and almost lawless Cambodia. Monsoon Wife is the first American-produced feature film to be shot entirely in Cambodia. Domestic rights for the movie were acquired by Universal Pictures and Netflix and other internet distributors continue to make the movie available to the public. In addition, a dozen countries have acquired television and DVD rights to the movie.

In 2005 Darrah directed and shot an HD documentary feature in Egypt, Jesus, The Lost Years for Sakkara Productions. The documentary was based on N.Y. Times best-selling author Paul Perry's book Jesus in Egypt and it premiered at the Cairo Opera House to members of the Mubarak family and more than 1500 others, including Egyptian cabinet members, ambassadors and Saudi princes. Mrs. Mubarak expressed great admiration for the film in the Egyptian press, and admitted that it showed "an Egypt I have never seen." She agreed to let the film be sold in Egypt under the condition that the name of Jesus not appear in the title to avoid inflaming Muslim radicals. As a result, the film was released in the Middle East under the title The Holy Family in Egypt.

Paul Perry/Sakkara Productions of Arizona contracted Darrah from 1995 to 2015 as director of photography and to assist in the co-production of several documentaries: Saved by the Light (1996); Painting the Paradox (1997); Visions and Miracles (2009); Afterlife (2010); Dali's Greatest Secret (2012); Glimpses of Eternity and Secret Mummies of Lisbon (2015).

From 2008 to 2023, Darrah shot and produced twenty 90-minute travel adventure video programs. In the last fifteen years, Darrah has presented these travel features to audiences and organizations around the country such as the Harvard Club of Boston, the Union Club of NYC and the Geographical Society of Philadelphia. His travel video features include: Japan (2026); Wonders of the World (2018); Turkey, Cradle of Civilization (2017); Spain & Portugal (2019); "Great Cities of Europe" (2016); The Great Silk Road (2011); Pearls of the Caribbean (2015); Mediterranean Dream (2014); Cuba (2011); Madagascar (2013); Tropical Asia (2020); The Amazon (2014); Central and South America (2010); Pakistan and Afghanistan (2010); Northern Europe (2011); Cities of Italy (2011); Voyage Down the Nile (2015) and Southern Europe.

Darrah traveled to Madagascar in 2012 to produce and shoot an HD travel-documentary feature about the history, people, and wildlife of the country. That same year, the National Center for Civil and Human Rights used a number of Darrah's shots of international children for the making of their official opening ceremony video presentation.

Darrah also works with Princess Cruises and with Silversea Cruises of Ft. Lauderdale, presenting lectures and his travel programs aboard their ships.

In 2020, Darrah wrote, produced and directed the thriller, Amazon Queen, a movie shot entirely in Brazil. New York Times best-selling author Paul Perry has described the movie as "Romantic, thrilling and exotic, this movie grabs hold and won't let you go. Independent filmmaking at its best." Vision Films is the worldwide distributor of Amazon Queen. The movie has won 52 awards at 85 film festivals and awards events in 25 countries. Amazon Queen has tallied over 35 million views on various streaming platforms around the world.

In 2023, Darrah produced and directed An Egypt Affair, an adventure thriller feature film shot entirely in Egypt. The 83-minute movie has won 38 awards at festivals and award events in the U.S. and 22 other countries.

Darrah co-wrote, produced and directed the feature film, Phantom India, (2026) a psychological thriller, shot entirely on-location in India.

Darrah lives in Los Angeles with his wife, producer and writer Lin Zuo. His daughter Maya McDarragh is an artist living in Portland, Oregon.

== Awards ==
Burton Holmes Award for "best travel programs"

for Amazon Queen

- “Best Director” & "Best Producers" - Rome International Movie Awards (June 2021)
- “Best Director” - Port Blair International Film Festival - India (July 2021)
- “Award of Merit, Special Mention" – Direction - IndieFEST San Diego (July 2021)
- “Best Director” – GRALHA (Brazil) International Film Awards (July 2021)
- “Best Director, International Feature Film” - Indo French International Film Festival, India (July 2021)
- “Best Director” - Prague International Film Festival (Fall 2021)
- “Best Director” - Anatolia International Film Festival (Turkey)
- “Outstanding Director” - Palm Beach Film Festival (2021)
- “Best Production” - Continental Film Festival (Munich - 2021)

=== for Monsoon Wife ===
- "Best Director" - Spokane-Northwest International Film Festival
