= USS Coronado =

USS Coronado may refer to:

- USS Coronado (PF-38), a patrol frigate, served in World War II as a convoy escort.
- USS Coronado (AGF-11), an auxiliary command ship, hosted the Navy's Sea Based Battle Lab (SBB).
- USS Coronado (LCS-4), the fourth littoral combat ship, commissioned on 5 April 2014.
