= Mystic River (novel) =

2001 novel by Dennis Lehane

- First edition cover
- Author: Dennis Lehane
- Cover artist: Chip Kidd (designer)
- Language: English
- Genre: Thriller; Psychological
- Publisher: William Morrow
- Publication date: February 2001
- Publication place: United States
- Media type: Print (hardback & paperback)
- Pages: 416 p. (hardback edition)
- ISBN: 0-688-16316-5 (hardback edition)

Mystic River is a novel by Dennis Lehane that was published in 2001. It won the 2002 Dilys Award and was made into an Academy Award-winning film in 2003.

== Plot ==
The novel's plot revolves around three boys who grow up as friends in Boston — Dave Boyle, Sean Devine, and Jimmy Marcus. At the beginning of the story, Dave is abducted by child molesters while he, Sean, and Jimmy are horsing around on a neighborhood street. Dave escapes and returns home days later, emotionally shattered by his experience. The novel then moves forward twenty-five years: Sean has become a homicide detective, Jimmy is an ex-convict who currently owns a convenience store, and Dave is a shell of a man. Jimmy's daughter disappears and is found brutally murdered in a city park, and that same night, Dave comes home to his wife, covered in blood. Sean is assigned to investigate the murder, and the three childhood friends are caught up in each other's lives again.

== Film adaptation ==
Mystic River, the Academy Award-winning adaptation of the novel, was released in 2003. The film was directed by Clint Eastwood and starred Sean Penn as Jimmy Markum (the character's last name was changed from Marcus to Markum for the film), Tim Robbins as Dave, and Kevin Bacon as Sean. It was nominated for six Academy Awards, including Best Picture, and won two: Best Actor for Penn, and Best Supporting Actor for Robbins.

== Awards and nominations ==
Mystic River won the 2002 Dilys Award presented by the Independent Mystery Booksellers Association. The same year, it also won the Massachusetts Book Award.
