= The Drop (2014 film) =

2014 film

- Theatrical release poster
- Directed by: Michaël R. Roskam
- Written by: Dennis Lehane
- Based on: "Animal Rescue" by Dennis Lehane
- Produced by: Peter Chernin; Dylan Clark; Mike Larocca
- Starring: Tom Hardy; Noomi Rapace; James Gandolfini; Matthias Schoenaerts; John Ortiz
- Cinematography: Nicolas Karakatsanis
- Edited by: Christopher Tellefsen
- Music by: Marco Beltrami
- Production company: Chernin Entertainment
- Distributed by: Fox Searchlight Pictures
- Release date: September 12, 2014
- Running time: 106 minutes
- Country: United States
- Language: English
- Budget: $12.6 million
- Box office: $18.9 million

The Drop is a 2014 American crime film directed by Michaël R. Roskam and written by Dennis Lehane, based on his 2009 short story "Animal Rescue". It follows Bob Saginowski, a barman who becomes entangled in an investigation after the mafia-run bar where he works is robbed. It stars Tom Hardy, Noomi Rapace, James Gandolfini (in his final film role), and Matthias Schoenaerts.

It premiered at the 2014 Toronto International Film Festival and was released theatrically on September 12, 2014, by Fox Searchlight Pictures. It received generally positive reviews and grossed $4.1 million during its opening weekend and $18.9 million worldwide, against a budget of $12.6 million.

== Plot ==
In Brooklyn, Robert "Bob" Saginowski tends a neighborhood bar run by his cousin Marvin Stipler, which the Chechen mafia uses as a "drop" for illegal money. Marv ridicules Bob for commemorating the tenth anniversary of Richie "Glory Days" Whelan's unsolved disappearance by giving Whelan’s friends a free round of tequila. Bob finds a pit bull pup abandoned in a garbage can outside the home of a woman named Nadia, and they rescue the battered dog together.

When the bar is robbed by two masked gunmen, Marv is annoyed when Bob tells NYPD Detective Torres that one robber wore a broken watch. Recognizing Bob from church, Torres questions his reluctance to take communion. Naming the dog Rocco, Bob bonds with Nadia, who offers to care for Rocco when Bob is at work. She later reveals that scars on her neck were self-inflicted when she struggled with drugs.

Chechen mobster Chovka Umarov threatens Marv and Bob to recover his stolen money. Meeting with Fitz, one of the thieves, Marv is revealed to have orchestrated the robbery, and a discussion with his sister Dottie reveals that he is desperate to pay for their father's life support. Bob is approached by a man who later appears at his home with proof he is Rocco's owner, but Bob refuses to return the mistreated dog.

Marv grows paranoid, and he and Bob find a bag outside the bar containing the stolen money and a severed arm with the broken watch, apparently delivered by the Chechens. Rocco's owner visits the bar, hinting intimate information that he knows Nadia. Marv informs Bob that the man is Eric Deeds, who has long claimed to have killed Richie Whelan. Immediately after disposing of the arm in New York Harbor, Bob is again questioned by Torres. Bob confronts Nadia, who later admits that Deeds is her unstable ex-boyfriend, but Bob assures her that he does not care about her past.

Bob and Marv return the money to the Chechens, who tell them that the bar will be the drop site on the night of the Super Bowl. When Fitz refuses to rob the bar again on the night of the drop, Marv kills him and recruits Deeds instead. Soon after, Bob confronts Deeds, who has previously demanded $10,000 in exchange for Rocco. Without payment, he has threatened to reclaim the puppy and kill Bob. Bob also checks in with Marv. Sensing Marv's plan, Bob warns him not to do something desperate again.

On the day of the Super Bowl, Marv claims to be ill and takes the day off from work. Bob retrieves cash hidden in his basement and waits for Deeds, who instead breaks into Nadia's home and forces her to go to the bar with him. There, Bob hides his money and a pistol, and receives numerous deposits of illegal cash throughout the night. Marv lines his trunk with plastic and waits near the bar, which is eventually empty except for Deeds and a frightened Nadia, who warns Bob that Deeds has a gun. Bob offers the $10,000 for Rocco but Deeds refuses it, instead threatening to harm Nadia if Bob does not open the time lock safe.

Bob explains that years earlier, Marv was a loan shark skimming money from the Chechens. A customer with a large debt won a casino jackpot and paid Marv everything he owed. Marv seized the opportunity to use the customer's money to cover what he had stolen from the Chechens, ordering Bob to kill the man and dispose of the body. Bob reveals that the man in the story is Richie "Glory Days" Whelan, countering the rumor that Eric was the one who killed him. Deeds denies Bob's story in an effort to protect his malicious reputation, and Bob mocks him before shooting him dead and disparaging Deeds's character to his expired corpse. A frightened Nadia asks Bob if she can leave, which Bob allows and reassures her that no one will ever hurt her again.

The Chechens arrive to dispose of Deeds's body and kill Marv, assuring Bob he is not alone and making him the bar's new manager. Later, Torres offers Bob condolences for Marv's death, unconvinced it was a carjacking gone wrong. Torres asks Bob about Deeds, who has gone missing and was last seen at the bar, just as Whelan has been; Torres reveals that although Deeds took credit for Whelan's death, he was in a psychiatric ward the night Whelan went missing. Torres insinuates that Bob is responsible for both disappearances, whispering in the latter's ear: "No one ever sees you coming, do they, Bob?". Torres then walks away, leaving Bob out of his investigations.

Bob visits Nadia with Rocco and asks if he should stay away from her from now on. After hesitating for a moment, Nadia offers to join him on a walk with Rocco.

== Cast ==
- Tom Hardy as Robert "Bob" Saginowski
- Noomi Rapace as Nadia Dunn
- James Gandolfini as Marvin "Cousin Marv" Stipler
- Matthias Schoenaerts as Eric Deeds
- John Ortiz as Detective Evandro Torres
- Elizabeth Rodriguez as Detective Romsey
- Danny McCarthy as Detective Dexter
- Michael Aronov as Chovka Umarov
- Morgan Spector as Andre
- Michael Esper as Rardy Bernard
- Khan Baykal as Tim Brennan
- Ross Bickell as Father Regan
- James Frecheville as "Fitz"
- Tobias Segal as Briele
- Patricia Squire as Millie
- Ann Dowd as Dottie Stipler
- Chris Sullivan as Jimmy
- Jeremy Bobb as Stevie
- Lucas Caleb Rooney as Paul
- James Colby as "Sully"
- Mike Houston as Danny
- Michael O'Hara as Sean

== Reception ==
=== Box office ===
The Drop opened in 809 theaters in North America and grossed $4,104,552, with an average of $5,074 per theater and ranking #6 at the box office. The film's widest release in the United States was 1,192 theaters and it ultimately earned $10,724,389 domestically and $7,933,992 internationally for a total of $18,899,662, above its budget of $12.6 million.

=== Critical response ===
The Drop received positive reviews from critics and has a score of 89% on Rotten Tomatoes based on 204 reviews with an average score of 7.10/10. The critical consensus states "There's no shortage of similarly themed crime dramas, but The Drop rises above the pack with a smartly written script and strong cast." On Metacritic it has a score of 69 out of 100 based on 36 critics, indicating "generally favorable reviews". Particular praise was given to the performances of Tom Hardy and James Gandolfini.

Film reviewer Mike Dennis gives it 3 ½ out of 4, citing "outstanding performances, script, direction, and especially cinematography by Nicolas Karakatsanis, whose bleak rendering of Brooklyn has never been matched."

=== Home media ===
The Drop was released on DVD and Blu-ray on January 20, 2015.
