= Bob Coronato =

American painter

- Artist of Western Americana
- Born: Robert Michael Coronato; May 25, 1970 (age 56); Newton, New Jersey

Robert "Bob" Coronato (born May 25, 1970) is an American painter and printmaker. Coronato is best known for his paintings of present-day Western Americana, cowboys, and American Indian life and culture.

== Life and career ==
Bob Coronato was born in Newton, New Jersey. His mother was an executive assistant, and his father was a C.P.A. As a boy he loved to draw and paint. He would stare at the paintings of the "Old West" in history books and be fascinated by the culture and way of life. He and everyone around him knew he wanted to be an artist. While in high school Coronato began painting murals and commission paintings for money and trade.

When Coronato was 18 he moved to New York City and took a summer course in illustration at Parsons School of Art and Design and New School for Social Research. He realized he needed to be closer to the subject matter he always wanted to paint and applied to Otis Parsons' sister school in California.

In 1991, while attending Otis Parsons in L.A., Coronato took a vacation to Wyoming and South Dakota. He visited the High Plains Heritage Museum in Spearfish, South Dakota which had advertised that they had original Charles Russell and Frederic Remington oil paintings.

After not seeing any paintings, he talked to the curator, Leo Giacometto. Giacometto told him that the collection had been pulled. The museum was to have a grand re-opening the following spring. Coronato asked if he could contribute paintings for the event. Giacometto said that if he liked the paintings he would give Coronato a show during the re-opening.

Coronato proceeded to turn every assignment into Western subject matter in oil on canvas, to prepare for the show. Coronato tortured his instructors by doing this: If the assignment was to paint an advertisement for an automobile, Coronato would paint a covered wagon. After graduating from Otis Parsons with a Bachelor of Fine Arts degree, Coronato returned to Spearfish and was granted his first museum show at the age of 23.

Coronato decided to get closer to his subject matter. He moved to a town with a population of less than 400 in the heart of "Cowboy Country" — Hulett, Wyoming — based on a recommendation he got at the museum show in South Dakota by a local saddle maker. The saddle maker offered the "starving artist" space above his saddle shop to work and live in while Coronato got settled. Eventually the relationship with the saddle maker became invaluable to the direction the young artist's career would take.

Coronato was introduced to many of the ranches in the area. Soon Coronato was free labor in exchange for the chance to capture the life of modern cowboys. His days were spent at brandings, helping to gather cattle, or just fixing fence on ranches as big as 300,000 acres. His nights were spent painting the events he had witnessed. George White, foremen of the I.P.Y ranch, and his wife Vicki took Coronato under their wing. They made sure he didn't "get himself killed", as George would say. He was always welcome and much of his early work comes from events and scenes from that ranch.

After diving into the "cowboy" way of life Coronato was introduced to Tom Waugh. Waugh is an artist specializing in Native American subject matter and a dealer in Native American artifacts. He introduced Coronato to the world of collecting and painting this subject matter. Coronato began studying American Indian culture, past and present. He began collecting American Indian artifacts and soon he was drawn to the many nearby reservations. Hulett is in a hub very close to the Crow, Cheyenne, and Sioux Indian reservations.

Coronato started visiting the reservations. He witnessed the beauty and tradition that was in practice. Coronato admires and respects the American Indians and their strength as a society. He wanted to share his experiences through his work and began painting the modern life on the reservations through depicting their practice of traditions. Coronato's work evolved from painting historical scenes to only painting what he saw in the present. Coronato was soon invited to attend Crow Fair on the Crow Agency in Montana and other ceremonies held on reservations throughout Montana, Wyoming, and South Dakota.

After Coronato had spent many years painting in oils, he decide to draw. He had always been influenced by Edward Borein and admired his intaglio copper plate etchings. Coronato began making plates and printing them in his studio in Wyoming in the late 1990s. Coronato is a successful intaglio printmaker who has produced numerous images. He was dubbed the "Leonardo da Vinci of Cowboy Art" by the New York Post and has mastered the skill of original printmaking.

=== Pittura di strati ===
While trying to produce more work, Coronato had been experimenting on combining the three mediums for nearly eight years. Coronato found a new way of combining his intaglio printmaking with his love of oil painting. The pittura di strati medium of silkscreen, oil, and acrylic is the only way to achieve the effect he wanted. Coronato wanted to explore the age-old tradition of silk screen with cutting-edge techniques with the drawing and imagery from his etchings.

Coronato begins by texturing a board with thick gesso. Multiple layers of acrylic paint are applied, and on top of the acrylic goes the silk screened line work. Layers of translucent oil paint are slowly built up. Oil can create fine glazes, transparent and slow to dry. As each layer builds up, they create effects of light and texture not possible with other painting techniques. This glazing technique is very similar to that of the artists of the Italian Renaissance, giving the paint a luminous quality.

By combining the painting mediums and the dozens of translucent layers of oil paint, the pittura di strati technique refines the work to a unique style of painting. Because of all the variables in the layering, glazing, and varnishing, paintings in the series are unique and can vary in color, texture, etc. Similar to the bronze method of producing art, the end result is the original intention of the artist, and all the steps through the process are the only way to get to the end finished piece.

In 2007 after attending hundreds of small town rodeos, Coronato was inspired to create rodeo posters in a vintage turn of the century style but using modern day imagery and techniques. Using pittura di strati, he began producing rodeo poster paintings he has become most known for.

== Smithsonian ==
Russell Means (2012), Smithsonian American Art Museum

In 2017 Bob’s painting/Portrait of Russell Means went on display in Washington DC in the National Portrait Gallery Hall of Contemporaries. This image is 75 5/8”× 38 1/8” × 2 1/4" and features Russell Means draped in an upside down American flag. Russell Means was Oglala Lakota Sioux. In 1968, he joined the American Indian Movement (AIM), a militant activist organization. When AIM occupied Wounded Knee, site of the infamous nineteenth-Century massacre of the Sioux, in 1973, Means was the organization’s spokesperson. The siege grew into a seventy-one day confrontation between armed AIM members and the federal authorities. Means left the group in 1988. Artist Bob Coronato wanted to honor Means, who agreed to sit for him as long as the portrait conveyed that “Indians are not the idea of old Hollywood westerns or to be thought of as ‘in the past’ but a people very much of today, and with a rich history.” The artist and Means decided to include the upside-down flag, a sign used by the Navy as a symbol of distress and that AIM often displayed during protests.

https://npg.si.edu/object/npg_NPG.2017.81

== Shows and awards ==
- Nominated by Southwest Art: "Artist Of the New Century Show": Won Grand Prize, Best of Show. 2002
- Masters of the American West Show, Autry Center Los Angeles 2009/2010
- Coeur d'Alene Art Auction, Reno, Nevada 1996
- Scottsdale Art Auction, Scottsdale, Arizona
- Great American Miniature Show, Settlers West Tucson
- Selected work on exhibition, Smithsonian National Portrait Gallery Permanent Collection 2017

== Magazine features ==
- Western Horseman
- Wild West Magazine
- Horses in Art Magazine
- Southwest Art, Dec 2007
- Art of the West, Sept/Oct 2008
