= Kevin Nwankwor =

Nigerian actor (born 1976)

- Born: August 15, 1976 (age 50); Issele Ukwu, Delta State
- Education: Federal University of Technology, Owerri; University of Atlanta; New York Film Academy
- Occupations: Director, Producer, Actor
- Years active: 1996 - present
- Organization: Kevstel Group
- Notable work: Enemy Within; A Mother's Love; Tempting Fate
- Spouse: Unoma Nwankwor
- Children: 2

Kevin Nkem Nwankwor (born 15 August 1976) is a Nigerian-born actor, film director and producer. Kevin gained fame after he wrote and produced the movies Enemy Within and A Mother's Love which went on to be among the official film selection at Gwinnett Center Film Festival and Marbella International Film Festival.

== Early life and career ==
Kevin Nwankwor was born in Issele Ukwu, an Igbo city in Aniocha North local government area of Delta State where he went on to finish his primary and secondary school education. In 2000, he earned a Bachelor of Science degree in Project Management from the Federal University of Technology, Owerri. While in the university, he starred in Nollywood movies Enemies and Heartless which also starred veteran actors Kanayo O. Kanayo, Saint Obi and Eucharia Anunobi. He also formed a Christian drama group "The Heavenly Theater" and went on to write short plays like In The Den of Agbalakwem I & II and Ashes of Regret.

Kevin relocated to Atlanta in 2008 where he earned an MBA degree in Marketing and then obtained a Master of Fine Arts in filmmaking from the New York Film Academy. After writing and producing Enemy Within and A Mother's Love, he went on to make his directing debut in the award-winning film Tempting Fate.

He is the C.E.O of KevStel Group LLC, a faith-based entertainment company he founded with the aim “to provide quality content based on faith, hope and love through visuals and print”.

== Filmography ==
- In The Den of Agbalakwem I (1996) (writer)
- In The Den of Agbalakwem II (1996) (writer)
- Enemies (1997) (actor)
- Heartless (1997) (actor)
- Ashes of Regret (1998) (writer)
- Enemy Within (2012) (writer, producer)
- A Mother's Love (2012) (writer, producer)
- Tempting Fate (2015) - (writer, producer, director)
- Muna (2019) (director and producer)

== Personal life ==
Kevin Nwankwor is married to Unoma Nwankwor, a Christian author who is known for her writings of Unexpected Blessing, When You Let Go and The Christmas Ultimatum. They reside in Atlanta with their two children.
