= Coronado, Panama =

Coastal city and resort in Panama

Coronado is a coastal city and resort located about 87 km (54 miles) southwest of Panama City. Coronado was the first resort development in Panama and is a popular destination for tourists.

== History ==
Coronado is part of the first structured agrarian culture that began to take form within Panama in the 18th century. The first colonial estates were established in Anton and in the Region of Llanos del Chirú (modern Coronado), with an economic system that included the use of slavery. The region included large prairies bordering the Pacific Ocean and became the site of the first legal possession of land in Panama. Between 1691 and 1693, three large estates were created to shape the structure of the real estate register.

This route was used by pirates, smugglers, fugitives, and road thieves among others that pillaged towns, set up ambushes, and favored the opening of the closed Hispanic trade route on the Coasts of the South Pacific, where Coronado had a singular position during colonial times.

The modern city was founded in 1941 by Robert Eisenmann and has continued to grow.

== Geography ==
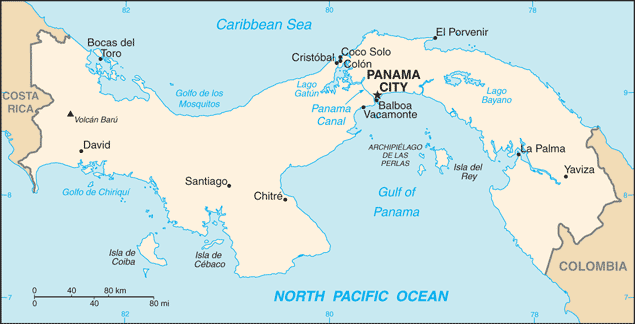
Map of Panama

Coronado is a coastal resort city in the Panamá Oeste province. It is south of Altos de Campana National park, a part of a stretch of forested mountains and hills north of Coronado. It is located on the Arco Seco (dry arch) notably named on the remarkably low precipitation rates in the region. Coronado is located on the Pacific coast of Panama, about 60 to 65 km (40 miles) from Panama City and about 90 km (55 miles) from Colón.
