= Janet Maslin =

American journalist and critic (born 1949)

- Maslin in 2025
- Born: August 12, 1949 (age 77); New York City, U.S.
- Education: University of Rochester (BA)
- Occupation: Journalist
- Years active: 1970–present
- Employer: The New York Times
- Known for: Film and literary criticism
- Spouse: Jon Landau (divorced) Benjamin Cheever (m. 1981)
- Children: 2

Janet R. Maslin (born August 12, 1949) is an American journalist, who served as a film critic for The New York Times from 1977 to 1999, serving as chief critic for the last six years, and then a literary critic from 2000 to 2015. In 2000, Maslin helped found the Jacob Burns Film Center in Pleasantville, New York. She is president of its board of directors.

== Education ==
Maslin graduated from the University of Rochester in 1970 with a bachelor's degree in mathematics.

== Career ==
Maslin began her career as a rock music critic for The Boston Phoenix and became a film editor and critic for that publication. She also worked as a freelancer for Rolling Stone and worked at Newsweek.

Maslin became a film critic for The New York Times in 1977. From December 1, 1994, she replaced Vincent Canby as the chief film critic. Maslin continued to review films for The Times until 1999, when she briefly left the newspaper. Her film criticism career, including her embrace of American independent cinema, is discussed in the documentary For the Love of Movies: The Story of American Film Criticism (2009). In the documentary, Entertainment Weekly critic Lisa Schwarzbaum recalls the excitement of having a woman as the lead reviewer at The New York Times. In a 2005 interview with Aaron Aradillas at Rockcritics.com, Maslin explained she quit reviewing films because she experienced burnout, expressing gratitude it ended when it did. Filmmaker Harmony Korine, whose directorial debut feature Gummo (1997) Maslin famously called "worst film of the year", noted how Maslin stopped working as a movie critic not long after.

From 1994 to 2003, Maslin was a frequent guest on Charlie Rose with 61 appearances on the program.

From 2000 she worked as a book reviewer for The New York Times; from 2015 as a contributor as opposed to being their full-time critic. As of 2023, Maslin continues to review books for the newspaper, albeit sparsely. In her review for Dennis Lehane's novel Small Mercies, she speculated it might be the author's last concluding with "As epitaphs go, you could do a lot worse." Among her reviews are many enthusiastic discoveries of then-unknown crime writers, the first American assessment of an Elena Ferrante novel, and a 2011 essay on the widowed Joyce Carol Oates's memoir, A Widow's Story, which offended some of Oates's admirers.

Media offices
Preceded by Vincent Canby	Chief film critic of The New York Times; 1994–1999	Succeeded by A.O. Scott and Manohla Dargis
