= Michaël R. Roskam =

Belgian film director

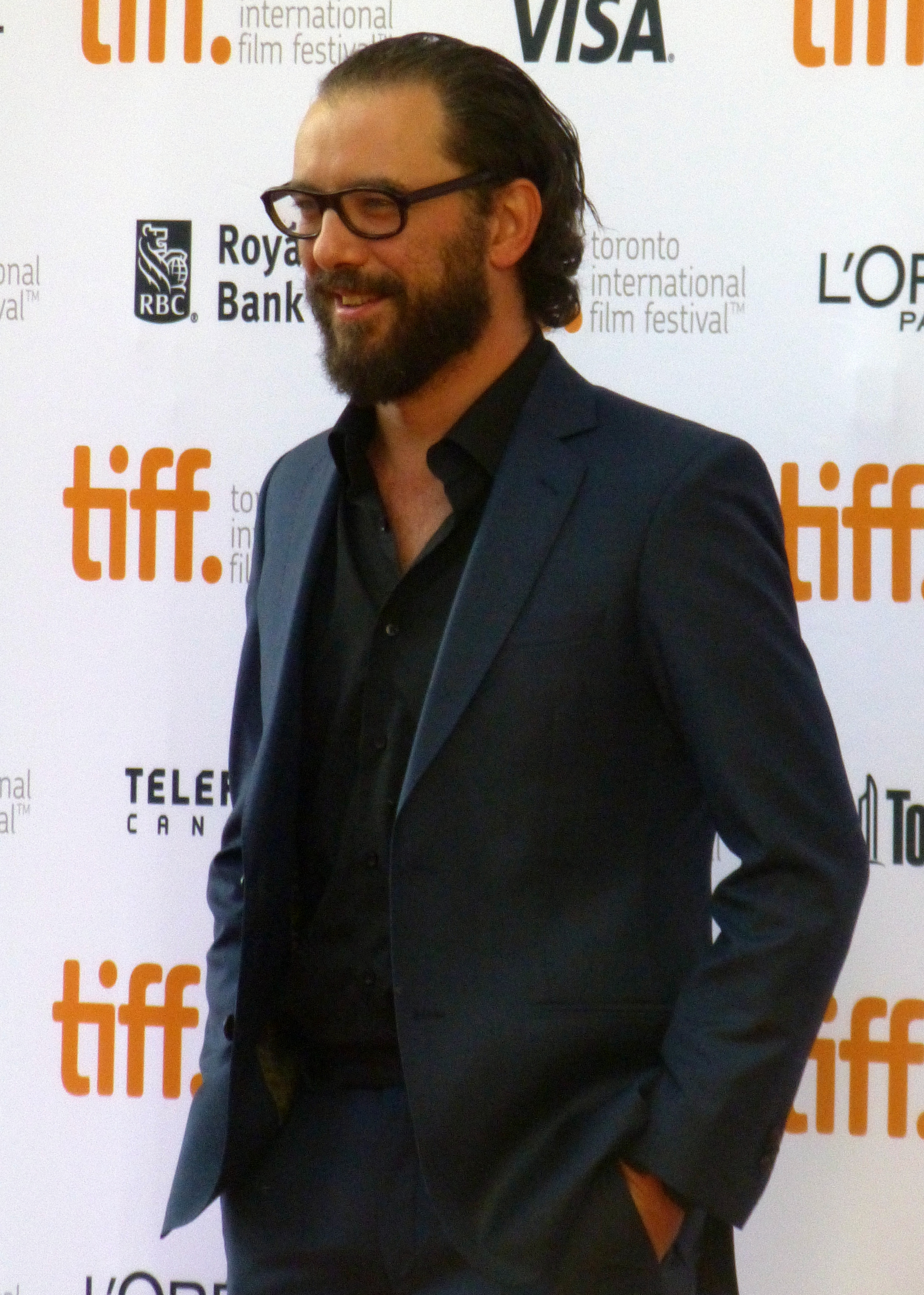
- Roskam at the 2014 Toronto International Film Festival
- Born: Michaël Reynders; 1972 (age 53–54); Sint-Truiden, Flanders, Belgium
- Occupation: Film director

Michaël R. Roskam (Dutch: [ˈmixaːɛl ˈrɔskɑm]; born 1972) is a Belgian film director.

== Career ==
Roskam attended St. Lucas Academy of Fine Arts in Brussels, where he studied painting and contemporary art. He graduated in 2005 from the Binger Film Institute in Amsterdam with a master's degree in script writing and development.

After several jobs as a journalist for Flemish newspaper De Morgen and as a copywriter, Roskam wrote a script for a short film titled Haun in 2002. This was followed by Carlo (2004), another short film, which was produced and won the Audience Award at Leuven International Short Film Festival.

In 2005, he made The One Thing To Do and in 2007 Today is Friday, based on an Ernest Hemingway book. The latter was filmed in Los Angeles.

Roskam made his feature film debut with Bullhead, which was released in 2011. On 24 January 2012, the film was nominated for the Academy Award for Best Foreign Language Film. He was named by Variety as one of the "10 directors to watch" at the 2012 Palm Springs Film Festival. He received the Magritte Award for Best Screenplay and the André Cavens Award for Best Film by the Belgian Film Critics Association (UCC).

In June 2012, Roskam was invited to join the Academy of Motion Picture Arts and Sciences along with 175 other individuals.

His film The Drop, starring Tom Hardy, Noomi Rapace, Matthias Schoenaerts and James Gandolfini, premiered at the Toronto International Film Festival on 5 September 2014. The Drop was Gandolfini's last on-screen performance before his death in June 2013. It received positive reviews from critics.

Roskam returned to Belgian cinema six years after Bullhead with The Racer and the Jailbird (2017), starring Matthias Schoenaerts.

== Filmography ==
=== Short films ===
- Haun (2002)
- Carlo (2004)
- The One Thing to Do (2005)
- Today is Friday (2007)

=== Feature films ===
- Bullhead (2011)
- The Drop (2014)
- Racer and the Jailbird (2017)
- Le Faux Soir (2026)

=== Television ===
- Berlin Station (2016) (Episodes 1, 2)
- Black Bird (2022) (Episodes 1, 2, 3)
