= Live by Night =

2012 Book by Dennis Lehane

- Author: Dennis Lehane
- Language: English
- Genre: Crime fiction
- Publisher: William Morrow and Company
- Publication date: October 2, 2012 (14 years ago)
- Publication place: United States
- Media type: Hardcover, audiobook
- Pages: 401
- ISBN: 978-0-06-000487-3
- OCLC: 794214253

Live by Night is a crime novel by American writer Dennis Lehane, published in 2012. The book depicts the rise of Joe Coughlin, a low level criminal in Boston who becomes a major organized crime figure in Tampa, Florida during the Prohibition era. It won a 2013 Edgar Award for novel of the year.

== Plot summary ==
By 1926, Prohibition has given rise to an endless network of underground distilleries, speakeasies, gangsters and corrupt cops. Joe Coughlin, the youngest son of a prominent Boston police captain, defies his proper upbringing by climbing a ladder of organized crime that takes him from Boston to Ybor City, Florida, to Havana, Cuba, where he encounters a dangerous cast of characters who are all fighting for their piece of the American dream.

When the novel begins, Joe is in the employ of one of Boston's most powerful mobsters, Tim Hickey. Joe and two friends knock off a gambling room located behind a speakeasy. Unbeknownst to them, the speakeasy belongs to Albert White, Hickey's biggest rival. Emma Gould, a server in the room and White's mistress, catches Joe's attention. They begin an affair.

Coughlin is later sent to Charlestown Penitentiary after a bank robbery goes awry. On the night of his arrest, the car Emma is traveling in crashes into a river and she is presumed dead. Joe comes under the protection of Italian mobster Maso Pescatore while in prison. While Joe and his father, Thomas, had a complicated relationship, Thomas agrees to do Pescatore's bidding to keep Joe safe in prison. The stress of these dealings gives Thomas a fatal heart attack.

Upon release, Pescatore sends Joe to Tampa, Florida, to solidify the family's rum-running operation. Joe builds a highly successful business with his henchman, Dion. Still grieving for Emma, he encounters a fiery Cuban expatriate and revolutionary, Graciela Corrales, and they become an intensely devoted couple. Graciela convinces Joe to mastermind the robbery of a weapons cache from an American warship to aid Fulgencio Batista's overthrow of Cuban strongman Gerardo Machado.

While building his empire, Joe fights against the Ku Klux Klan. The local leader of the Klan is related to Figgis, Tampa's police chief. Joe blackmails Figgis with pornographic photographs of his daughter Loretta, whom Figgis had believed was working in Los Angeles as an actress. Figgis' daughter later returns to Tampa and becomes a famous preacher. Loretta later reveals to Joe that she does not believe in God and is merely performing. Loretta later commits suicide, after which it is revealed that she was sexually abused by her father.

When Pescatore decides to replace Joe with his own dimwitted son, White uses this opportunity to seek revenge against Joe, whom he blames for Emma's death. Joe escapes and regains control of his empire. He, Graciela, and their small son return to Havana to live a quieter life. Dion becomes head of the family while Joe acts as an advisor. In Cuba, Joe meets Emma outside the brothel where she works. She reveals she was involved in Joe's arrest. When Joe and Graciela return to the U.S. for a visit, Graciela is shot and killed by Figgis. Joe turns his back on organized crime to live a more mundane life with his son.

== Film adaptation ==
Warner Bros. produced a film adaptation with Ben Affleck directing, writing, producing, and starring as Joe Coughlin, while Leonardo DiCaprio and Jennifer Davisson Killoran served as producers. The film was released on December 25, 2016 and received mixed reviews from critics.
