= List of awards and nominations received by Caitríona Balfe =

Caitríona Balfe awards and nominations
- Balfe at the 2026 New York Film Festival
Awards and nominations
Award	Wins	Nominations
Actor Awards	0	2
BAFTA Awards	1	3
Critics' Choice	1	7
Golden Globes	0	5

Totals (Note: Certain award groups do not simply award one winner. They acknowledge several different recipients, have runners-up, and have third place. Since this is a specific recognition and is different from losing an award, runner-up mentions are considered wins in this award tally. For simplification and to avoid errors, each award in this list has been presumed to have had a prior nomination.)
- Wins: 61
- Nominations: 132

Caitríona Balfe is an Irish actress and former model. Known for her roles in film and television, she has received accolades including a BAFTA Scotland Award and a Critics' Choice Award as well as nominations for two Actor Awards, a BAFTA Award, and five Golden Globe Awards.

Her breakout role was as Claire Fraser in the Starz historical fantasy television series Outlander (2014–2026), which she also served as an executive producer. The role earned her numerous accolades including the BAFTA Scotland Award for Best Actress as well as nominations for two Critics' Choice Television Award for Best Actress in a Drama Series and four Golden Globe Award for Best Actress – Television Series Drama. She also received nominations for four Irish Film & Television Awards, two People Choice Awards, a Satellite Award, and eight Saturn Awards.

On film, she received critical attention for her portrayal of a working class mother during the outbreak of The Troubles in the Kenneth Branagh's semi-autobiographical drama Belfast (2021) for which she won the Critics' Choice Movie Award for Best Acting Ensemble and was nominated for the Actor Award for Outstanding Performance by a Female Actor in a Supporting Role, the BAFTA Award for Best Actress in a Supporting Role, the Critics' Choice Movie Award for Best Supporting Actress and the Golden Globe Award for Best Supporting Actress – Motion Picture.

== Major associations ==
=== Actor Awards ===
Year	Category	Nominated work	Result	Ref.
2021	Outstanding Actress in a Supporting Role	Beflast	Nominated	
2021	Outstanding Cast in Motion Picture	Beflast	Nominated	

=== BAFTA Awards ===
Year	Category	Nominated work	Result	Ref.
BAFTA Film Awards
2021	Best Supporting Actress	Belfast	Nominated	
BAFTA Scotland Awards
2016	Best Actress on Television	Outlander	Won	
2022	Best Actress on Television	Outlander	Nominated	

=== Critics' Choice Awards ===
Year	Category	Nominated work	Result	Ref.
Critics' Choice Movie Awards
2021	Best Supporting Actress	Belfast	Nominated	
2021	Best Acting Ensemble	Belfast	Won	
Critics' Choice Television Award
2016	Best Actress in a Drama Series	Outlander	Nominated	
2017	Best Actress in a Drama Series	Outlander	Nominated	
2025	Best Actress in a Drama Series	Outlander	Nominated	
Critics' Choice Super Awards
2021	Best Actress In A Science Fiction/Fantasy Series	Outlander	Nominated	
2025	Best Actress In A Science Fiction/Fantasy Series	Outlander	Nominated	

=== Golden Globe Awards ===
Year	Category	Nominated work	Result	Ref.
2016	Best Actress – Television Series Drama	Outlander	Nominated	
2017	Best Actress – Television Series Drama	Outlander	Nominated	
2018	Best Actress – Television Series Drama	Outlander	Nominated	
2019	Best Actress – Television Series Drama	Outlander	Nominated	
2021	Best Supporting Actress – Motion Picture	Belfast	Nominated	

== Miscellaneous awards ==
Year	Work	Award	Category	Result	Ref.
2015	BBC America Anglophenia Fan Favourite Awards	Woman Of The Year	Outlander	Won	
2015	The Anglophile Channel Awards	Best Actress in a Television Series	Outlander	Won	
2015	Saturn Awards	Best Actress on Television	Outlander	Won	
2015	Irish Film & Television Awards	Best Actress in a Lead Role Drama	Outlander	Nominated	
2015	Irish Film & Television Awards	Rising Star Award	Outlander	Nominated	
2015	EWwy Awards	Best Actress in a Drama Series	Outlander	Won	
2016	People's Choice Awards	Favorite Cable Sci-Fi/Fantasy TV Actress	Outlander	Won	
2016	Satellite Awards	Best Television Ensemble	Outlander	Won	
2016	Women's Image Network Awards	Outstanding Actress in a Drama Series	Outlander	Won	
2016	Saturn Awards	Best Actress on Television	Outlander	Won	
2016	Irish Film & Television Awards	Best Actress in a Lead Role Drama	Outlander	Nominated	
2016	The Anglophile Channel Awards	Best Actress in a Television Series	Outlander	Won	
2016	EWwy Awards	Best Actress in a Drama Series	Outlander	Won	
2017	People's Choice Awards	Favorite Sci-Fi/Fantasy TV Actress	Outlander	Won	
2017	Oscar Wilde Awards	—N/a	Outlander	Awarded	
2017	Women's Image Network Awards	Outstanding Actress in a Drama Series	Outlander	Nominated	
2017	Irish Film & Television Awards	Best Actress in a Lead Role TV Drama	Outlander	Nominated	
2017	Saturn Awards	Best Actress on Television	Outlander	Nominated	
2018	Women's Image Network Awards	Outstanding Actress in a Drama Series	Outlander	Nominated	
2018	Satellite Awards	Best Actress in a TV Drama Series//Genre Series	Outlander	Nominated	
2018	Irish Film & Television Awards	Best Actress in a Lead Role TV Drama	Outlander	Won	
2018	Saturn Awards	Best Actress on Television	Outlander	Nominated	
2019	Saturn Awards	Best Actress on a Television Series	Outlander	Nominated	
2020	Irish Film & Television Awards	Best Actress in a Lead Role TV Drama	Outlander	Nominated	
2020	Irish Film & Television Awards	Best Actress in a Supporting Role Film	Ford v Ferrari	Nominated	
2020	Women's Image Network Awards	Outstanding Actress in a Drama Series	Outlander	Nominated	
2020	Women's Image Network Awards	Film/Show Produced by a Woman	Outlander	Nominated	
2021	Satellite Awards	Actress in a Series, Drama/Genre	Outlander	Nominated	
2021	46th Annual Gracie Awards	Actress in a Leading Role – Drama	Outlander	Won	
2021	Saturn Awards	Best Actress on Television	Outlander	Won	
2021	Napa Valley Film Festival Awards	Spotlight Award	Belfast	Awarded	
2021	Santa Barbara International Film Festival	Virtuosos Award	Belfast	Awarded	
2021	Palm Springs International Film Festival	Vanguard Award	Belfast	Awarded	
2021	British Independent Film Awards	Best Actress	Belfast	Nominated	
2021	San Diego Film Critics Society	Best Actress	Belfast	Won	
2021	Online Association of Female Film Critics	Best Supporting Actress	Belfast	Nominated	
2021	Online Association of Female Film Critics	Best Acting Ensemble	Belfast	Nominated	
2021	Las Vegas Film Critics Society	Best Supporting Actress	Belfast	Nominated	
2021	Iowa Film Critics Association	Best Supporting Actress	Belfast	Won	
2021	IFTA Film & Drama Awards	Best Supporting Actress	Belfast	Nominated	
2021	North Dakota Film Society	Best Supporting Actress	Belfast	Nominated	
2021	Hawaii Film Critics Circle	Best Supporting Actress	Belfast	Nominated	
2021	Chicago Film Critics Association	Best Supporting Actress	Belfast	Nominated	
2021	Indiana Film Journalists Association	Best Supporting Actress	Belfast	Nominated	
2021	Phoenix Critics Circle	Best Supporting Actress	Belfast	Nominated	
2021	Columbus Film Critics Association	Best Supporting Actress	Belfast	Nominated	
2021	AACTA International Awards	Best Supporting Actress	Belfast	Nominated	
2021	Hollywood Critics Association	Best Supporting Actress	Belfast	Nominated	
2021	Hollywood Critics Association	Best Ensemble Cast	Belfast	Won	
2021	Satellite Awards	Best Supporting Actress	Belfast	Nominated	
2021	Washington DC Area Film Critics Association Awards	Best Supporting Actress	Belfast	Nominated	
2021	Washington DC Area Film Critics Association Awards	Best Ensemble Cast	Belfast	Nominated	
2022	Online Film and Television Association	Best Ensemble Cast	Belfast	Nominated	
2022	Saturn Awards	Saturn Award for Best Actress on Television	Outlander	Nominated	
2022	Women's Image Network Awards	Outstanding Actress in a Drama Series	Outlander	Nominated	
2022	Irish Film and Television Awards	Lead Actress Drama	Outlander	Nominated	
2023	Saturn Awards	Best Actress on a Television Series	Outlander	Won	
2024	Saturn Awards	Best Actress in a Television Series	Outlander	Won	
