= Caitríona Balfe =

Irish actress (born 1979)

- Balfe at the 2026 New York Film Festival
- Born: Caitríona Mary Balfe; 4 October 1979 (age 47); Dublin, Ireland
- Education: Dublin Institute of Technology
- Occupations: Actress; model
- Years active: 1998–present
- Spouse: Anthony McGill (m. 2019)
- Children: 1
- Awards: Full list

Caitríona Mary Balfe (/kəˈtriːnə ˈbælf/ kuh-TREE-nuh BALF; born 4 October 1979) is an Irish actress and former model. Her accolades include a BAFTA Scotland Award and a Critics' Choice Award as well as nominations for two Actor Awards and five Golden Globe Awards.

She began her career as a fashion model in Paris at age 18, working with fashion houses such as Chanel and Louis Vuitton, before transitioning to acting a decade later. She took early roles in the shows The Beauty Inside (2012) and H+: The Digital Series (2012–2013), before her breakout role as Claire Fraser in Outlander (2014–2026), for which she has been nominated for four Golden Globe Awards.

On film, she portrayed a working class mother during the outbreak of The Troubles in Kenneth Branagh's semi-autobiographical drama Belfast (2021) for which she was nominated for a Actor Award, BAFTA Award, and Golden Globe Award. She also acted in the films Super 8 (2011), Now You See Me (2013), Escape Plan (2013), Money Monster (2016), Ford v Ferrari (2019), and Sense and Sensibility (2026).

== Early life ==
Caitriona Mary Balfe was born on 4 October 1979 in Dublin, and grew up outside the village of Tydavnet in County Monaghan. She is the fourth of five children although her parents subsequently adopted a further two children. Her father was a Garda sergeant. She went to Dublin Institute of Technology to study drama, before being spotted by a model scout.

== Career ==
=== 2006–2014: Early acting roles ===
While living in New York City, Balfe played an employee of the magazine Runway in the 2006 film The Devil Wears Prada. In 2009, after a decade-long modeling career, Balfe returned to her initial career choice and moved from New York to Los Angeles, spending her first year and a half in the city exclusively taking acting classes, first at the Warner Loughlin Studios and then at the Sanford Meisner Center and the Judith Weston Studios. Balfe appeared in Super 8 as the protagonist's mother, Now You See Me as Michael Caine's character's wife, and Escape Plan as the CIA lawyer that hires Sylvester Stallone's character. In 2012 she portrayed Alex #34 in The Beauty Inside. In 2013 she starred in the music videos for "First Fires" by British musician Bonobo and for "Chloroform" by French band Phoenix, the latter directed by Sofia Coppola.

Balfe was part of the main cast of the Warner Bros. web series H+: The Digital Series during 2012 and 2013, in which she played Breanna Sheehan, one of the executives of a biotechnology company that develops an implanted computer which allows people to be connected to the Internet 24 hours a day.

=== 2013–2015: Breakthrough with Outlander ===
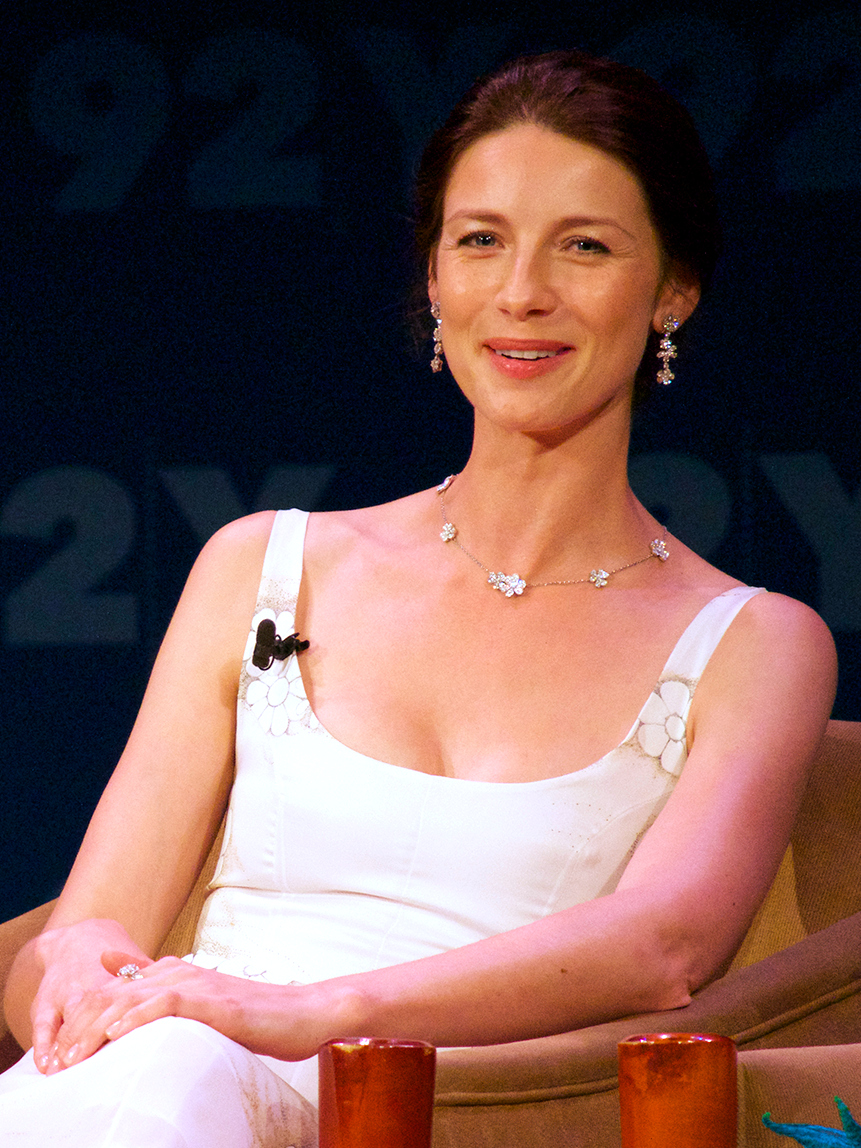
Balfe at the Outlander premiere in New York (2014)

In September 2013, Balfe was cast as the lead character, Claire Beauchamp Randall Fraser, on the Starz television drama series Outlander, based on the novels written by Diana Gabaldon; the series premiered in August 2014. She plays a mid-20th-century nurse (later surgeon) who is transported back in time to the war-torn mid-18th-century Scottish Highlands. Both the series and her performance have received critical acclaim, with Richard Lawson of Vanity Fair saying "it helps immensely that Balfe is such an appealing actress, [she] makes Claire a spirited, principled, genuinely heroic heroine". Tim Goodman of The Hollywood Reporter wrote that Balfe is "reason enough to watch; she's a confident actress who brings various shades to her character." James Poniewozik of Time labelled Balfe's portrayal as "wry, [and] infectiously engaging." Angelica Jade Bastién of The New York Times called Balfe "one of the most stunning actresses on television".

In December 2014, Entertainment Weekly named Balfe one of its 12 Breakout Stars of 2014; that month she was also voted "Woman Of The Year" at BBC America's Anglophenia Fan Favorites tournament.

In April 2015, Balfe received Best Actress in a Lead Role Drama and Rising Star Award nominations for the 12th Irish Film & Television Awards, and was named one of People magazine's "50 Most Beautiful People in the World". She won Saturn Awards for Best Actress on Television in 2015 and 2016. In November 2016, Balfe won the Scottish BAFTA award for Best Actress on Television and in February 2018 she won the Irish IFTA for Best Actress in a Lead Role Drama. Balfe also received four nominations for the Golden Globe Award for Best Actress – Television Series Drama for her role in Outlander.

=== 2016–present: Career expansion ===
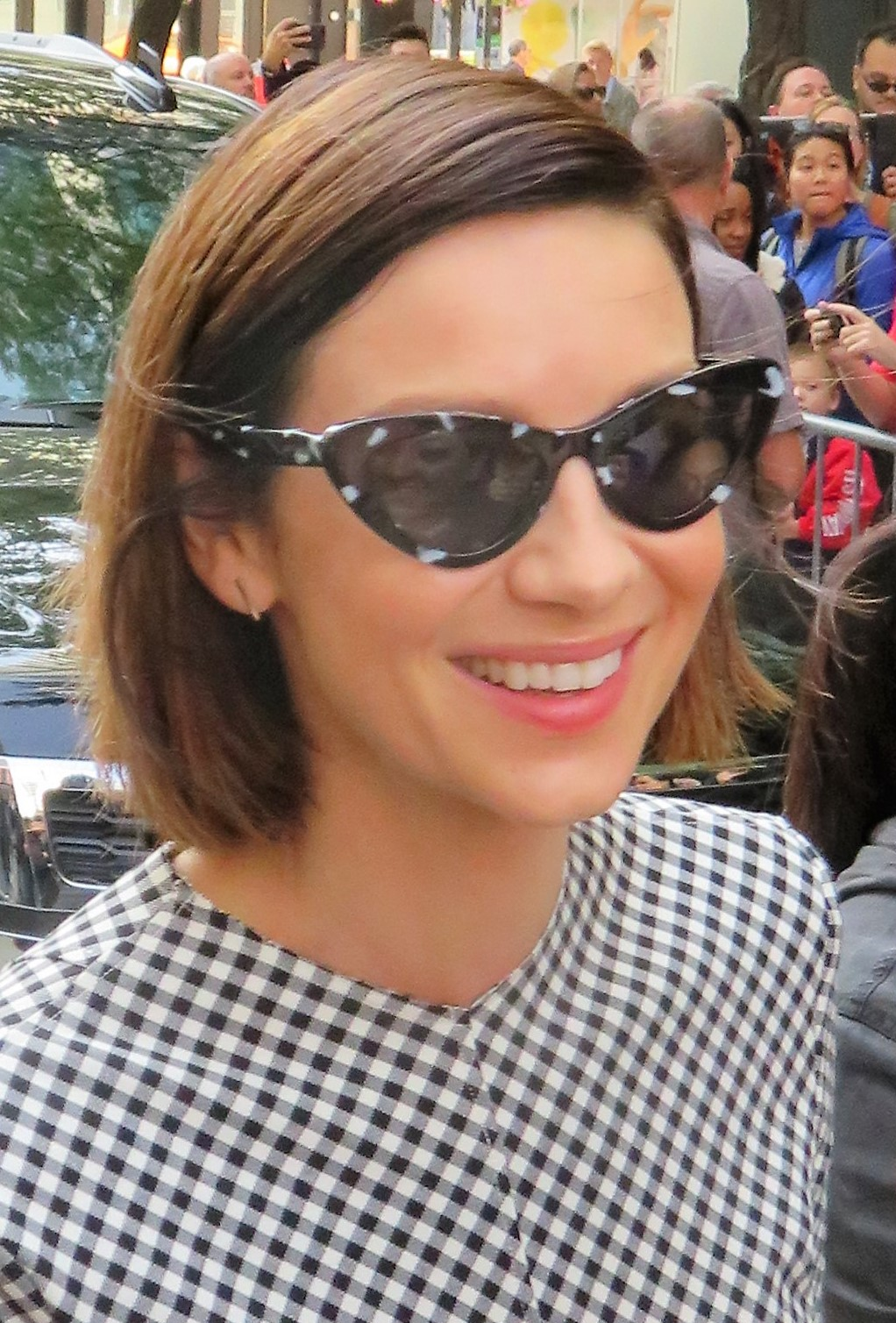
Caitriona Balfe at the press conference of Ford v Ferrari (2019)

Balfe co-starred in the film Money Monster (2016), directed by Jodie Foster and starring George Clooney and Julia Roberts. She played the head of PR of a company whose stock bottoms out, causing a man to lose all of his savings and subsequently take hostages on a live TV show. Eric Hills of The Movie Waffler wrote "But it's relative newcomer Balfe who leaves the greatest impression; she's magnetic, stealing scenes even when her character is only glimpsed reacting to the situation on a background monitor. Expect to see a lot more of this Irish actress in the coming years."

In 2019, Balfe had a recurring voice role as Tavra in the Netflix fantasy series The Dark Crystal: Age of Resistance. The series, which was a prequel to the 1982 fantasy film The Dark Crystal and produced by the Jim Henson Company, was released to critical acclaim. Also in 2019, she had a starring role opposite Matt Damon and Christian Bale in the sports drama film Ford v Ferrari. Balfe portrayed Mollie Miles, the wife of professional race car driver Ken Miles, a role which earned her an IFTA nomination for Best Actress in a Supporting Role. The film received universal acclaim upon release and was nominated for the Academy Award for Best Picture.

In 2021, Balfe had a co-starring role in Kenneth Branagh's semi-autobiographical film Belfast, for which she received critical acclaim. Critic Richard Lawson of Vanity Fair lauded Balfe for her "modest, affable performance". Her performance earned her nominations for the Screen Actors Guild Award, Golden Globe Award, Critics' Choice Movie Award, and British Academy Film Award for Best Supporting Actress. The film was nominated for Best Picture at the 94th Academy Awards. She has been a member of the Actors Branch of the Academy of Motion Picture Arts and Sciences since June 2022.

Balfe starred in the 20th Century Studios film The Amateur in 2025.

Balfe joined the ensemble of Apple Original Films' upcoming film Tenzing in the spring of 2025, which also stars Tom Hiddleston and Willem Dafoe. Oscar-winning producer See-Saw Films (The King's Speech) is producing Tenzing, about the inspirational life of Sherpa Tenzing Norgay and his summit of Mount Everest in 1953 alongside fellow outsider New Zealander Edmund Hillary. Balfe will play Jill Henderson, a friend of Tenzing who helped organize trips up Mount Everest. Jennifer Peedom is directing the film. Peedom has a close relationship with the Tenzing family and the Sherpa community following her acclaimed documentary, Sherpa. Principal photography commenced in Nepal in May 2025, with filming on location in Kathmandu and the Everest region expected to last for a month.

Balfe will also star in Georgia Oakley's film adaptation of Sense and Sensibility, which started production in the UK in July 2025 for Focus Features and Working Title Films. Frank Dillane and Fiona Shaw have also joined the cast, alongside previously announced members Daisy Edgar-Jones and Esmé Creed-Miles as Elinor and Marianne Dashwood. Balfe will star as their mother Mrs. Dashwood. UK filmmaker Oakley is directing from a script by Australian author Diana Reid, based on Jane Austen's 1811 novel. The story follows the Dashwood sisters as they tackle love, loss and financial uncertainty amid the societal expectations of 18th-century England.

In was announced in October 2025 that Balfe was cast in Andrew Haigh's A Long Winter. From Mubi and Film4, the film is produced by Tristan Goligher for The Bureau, Chad Oakes and Mike Frislev for Calgary-based Nomadic Pictures, and Michael Elliott. The film also stars Ebon Moss-Bachrach, Fred Hechinger, Kit Connor, D'Pharaoh Woon-A-Tai, Manuel Garcia-Rulfo, and David Furr. The film was developed by Mubi and is co-financed by Mubi and Film4. Farhana Bhula, director of Film4, and Max Park, development and production executive, are overseeing the project for Film4. Principal photography was completed at the end of 2025 in Alberta, Canada on the film, which is based on Haigh's adaptation of Colm Tóibín's short story of the same name. The film is set in the mountains as fall comes to an end and a family prepares for the long winter ahead.

== Other ventures ==
=== Modeling ===
Balfe started modelling after she was scouted by an agent while she was collecting money for charity at a local shopping centre. At 18, after working as a model in Dublin for a few months, she caught the attention of a visiting Ford Models scout, who offered her the chance to work for them in Paris.

Balfe's modelling career highlights include opening and closing fashion shows for Chanel, Givenchy, Dolce & Gabbana, Moschino, Alberta Ferretti, Louis Vuitton and Victoria's Secret. In a three-year period, she walked in more than 250 runway shows. At the height of her career, Balfe was considered to be among the twenty most in-demand models in the world.

In 2013, Balfe returned to modelling once again and teamed up with renowned Australian photographer and activist James Houston, who captured her at Arizona's Antelope Canyon. Using the backdrop of the sacred Navajo territory, he brought his creative vision of its surrounding fantasy landscape, as part of the latest passion project for a photographic book and exhibition event series Natural Beauty. This series was aimed at raising awareness and supporting initiatives for the environmental non-profit organisation Global Green USA, which include some of the world's most prominent celebrities and top models, incorporating several elements of the images to shift toward funds and secure future.

=== Philanthropy ===
In 2014, she became a patron of the organization World Child Cancer. She visited World Child Cancer facilities in Ghana in 2016, meeting with key healthcare staff in Accra and Kumasi. She also spent time with the children there receiving care and their families. In 2017, the organization reported that Balfe's fans raised over £100,000. In April 2018, she ran the London Marathon, raising over US$41,000 in support of the organization. She has also hosted several campaigns selling shirts featuring her Outlander character Claire Fraser with proceeds benefiting World Child Cancer. In June 2023, Balfe appeared on BBC Radio 4 Appeal to share the story of one of the children World Child Cancer has supported. The appeal raised a total of £28,101.

In October 2020, a group of fans who met through Balfe's pandemic online book club created a fundraising initiative they called Project CaiTREEna, to raise money for the environmental charity One Tree Planted in honour of Balfe's 41st birthday. With Balfe's support, fans raised nearly $50,000 that year. As of 2024, over US$217,000 has been raised and more than 217,000 trees planted worldwide in her honour.

In August 2020, Balfe launched Forget Me Not, a Scottish-based small-batch gin. Twenty-five per cent of the proceeds from sales go to funding arts programmes.

In November 2025, Balfe announced her collaboration with Choose Love, hand painting a tee shirt through Everpress in order to raise money for displaced people and refugees around the world. For the project. she hand-painted a "Forget Me Nots" design for a limited-edition T-shirt, with all proceeds supporting Choose Love's work providing medical care, food, shelter, and support for LGBTQIA+ individuals in refugee communities around the world.

== Personal life ==
Balfe lives in London and, during the filming of Outlander, also resided in Glasgow. She previously lived in Los Angeles, where she started acting professionally, and in New York City, Paris, London, Milan, Hamburg, and Tokyo while working as a model. Balfe used to be fluent in the Irish language and still retains some phrases. Additionally, she is conversant in French.

On 10 August 2019, Balfe married her long-time boyfriend, former band manager and businessman Tony McGill at St. Mary's Church in Bruton, Somerset. She announced on 18 August 2021 that she had given birth to their son. She identifies herself as a lapsed Roman Catholic.

== Filmography ==
Key
†	Denotes productions that have not yet been released

=== Film ===
Year	Title	Role	Notes
2006	The Devil Wears Prada	Clacker	Uncredited
2011	Super 8	Elizabeth Lamb	
2012	Lost Angeles	Véronique	
2013	Crush	Andie	
2013	Now You See Me	Jasmine Tressler	
2013	Escape Plan	Jessica Miller	
2015	The Price of Desire	Gabrielle Bloch	
2016	Money Monster	Diane Lester	
2019	Ford v Ferrari	Mollie Miles	
2020	Angela's Christmas Wish	Dorothy's Mother (voice)	
2021	Belfast	Ma	
2024	The Cut	Caitlin Harney	
2025	The Amateur	Inquiline Davies	
2026	A Long Winter	Louise	
2026	Tenzing	Jill Henderson	
2026	Sense and Sensibility	Mrs. Dashwood	
2027	The Housekeeper †	Danni	Post-production
2028	Tangled †	Queen Arianna	Filming

=== Television ===
Year	Title	Role	Notes	Ref.
2010	The Model Scouts	Herself / Runway Mentor	Cycle 2, Episode 2	
2012	The Beauty Inside	Alex #34	Main role, 5 episodes	
2012–2013	H+: The Digital Series	Breanna Sheehan	Main role, 7 episodes	
2014–2026	Outlander	Claire Beauchamp Randall Fraser	Main role, 101 episodes; Also producer/executive producer, 38 episodes; Also director, 1 episode	
2019	The Dark Crystal: Age of Resistance	Tavra	Voice, 9 episodes	
2019	The Christmas Letter	Ellie	Voice; Television film	
TBA	Ascension †	Rose	Main role	
