= Actor Award for Outstanding Performance by a Female Actor in a Supporting Role =

Award

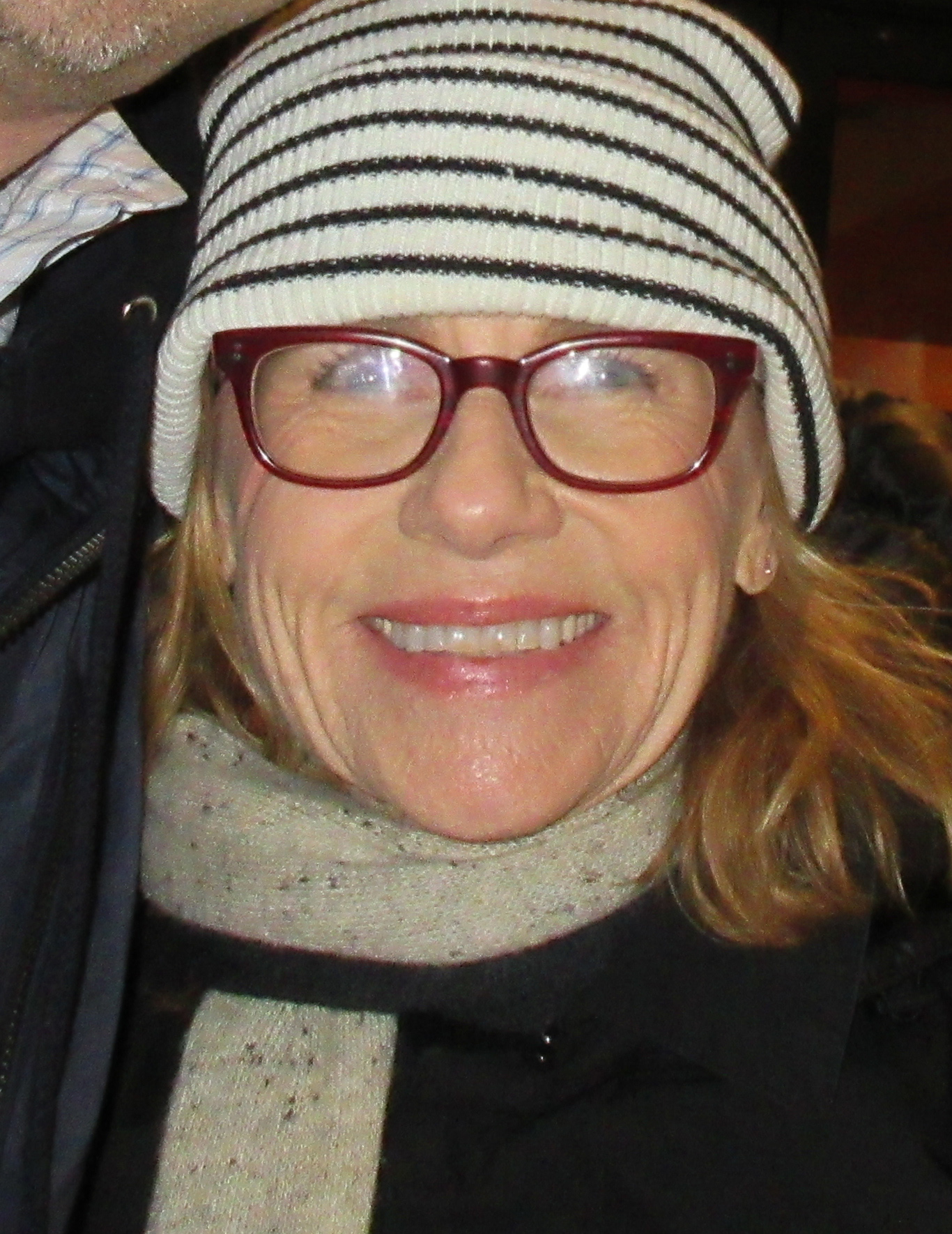
- The 2025 recipient: Amy Madigan
- Awarded for: Outstanding Performance by a Female Actor in a Supporting Role in a Motion Picture
- Location: Los Angeles, California
- Presented by: SAG-AFTRA
- First award: Dianne Wiest for Bullets over Broadway (1994)
- Currently held by: Amy Madigan for Weapons (2025)
- Website: sagawards.org

The Actor Award for Outstanding Performance by a Female Actor in a Supporting Role in a Motion Picture (formerly Screen Actors Guild Award for Outstanding Performance by a Female Actor in a Supporting Role) is an award presented annually by SAG-AFTRA. It has been presented since the 1st Screen Actors Guild Awards in 1995 to a female actor who has delivered an outstanding performance in a supporting role in a film released that year.

The award has been presented 32 times to 30 actresses. Dianne Wiest was the first recipient, winning for Bullets over Broadway (1994). The most recent winner is Amy Madigan who won for her performance in Weapons (2025). Kate Winslet has won the award twice; no other actress has won it more than once. Cate Blanchett has the most nominations with five, with one win. At the 4th Screen Actors Guild Awards, Kim Basinger and Gloria Stuart both received the award; the only time this category has been tied.

== Winners and nominees ==
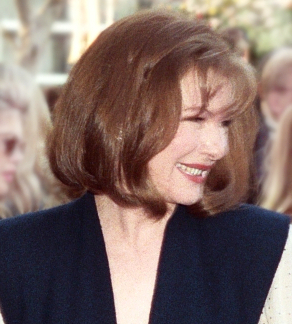
Dianne Wiest was the award's first winner, for Bullets over Broadway (1994).

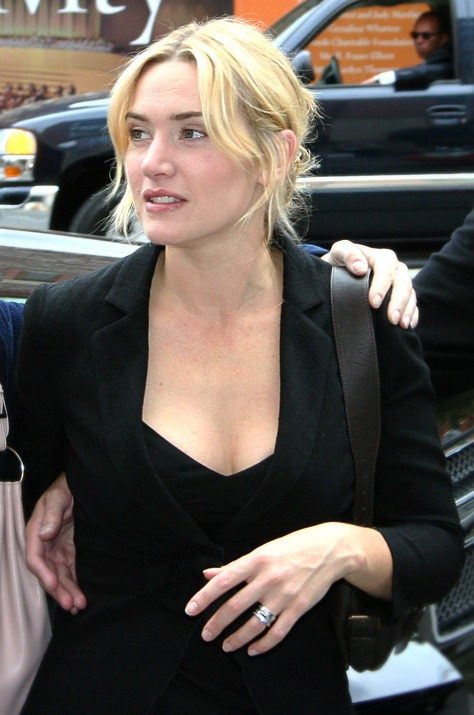
Kate Winslet won twice, for Sense and Sensibility (1995) and The Reader (2008).

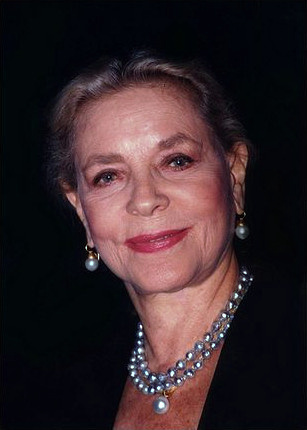
Lauren Bacall won for The Mirror Has Two Faces (1996).

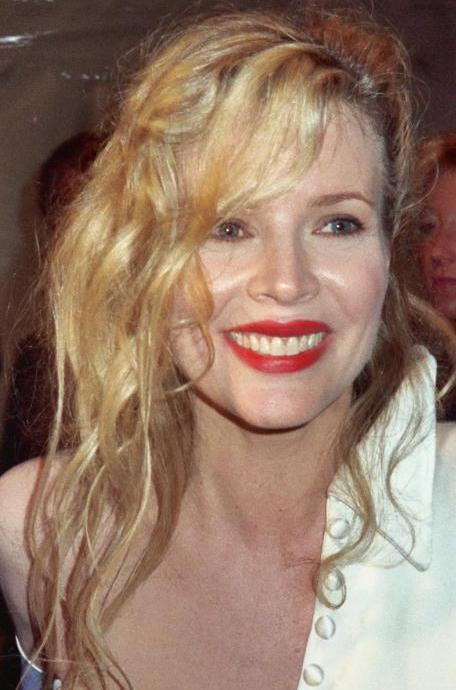
Kim Basinger won for L.A. Confidential (1997), in a tie with Gloria Stuart.

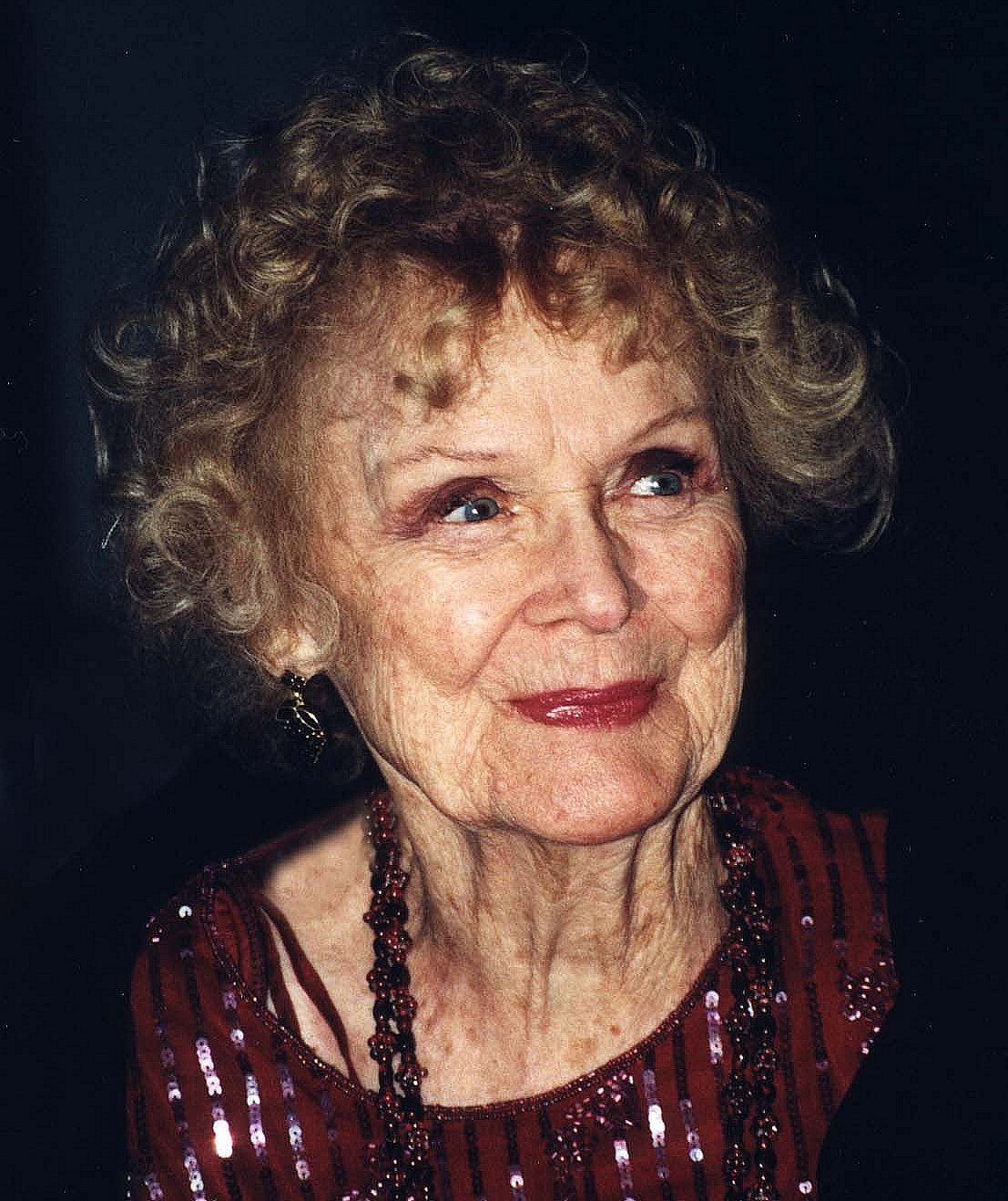
Gloria Stuart won for Titanic (1997), in a tie with Kim Basinger.

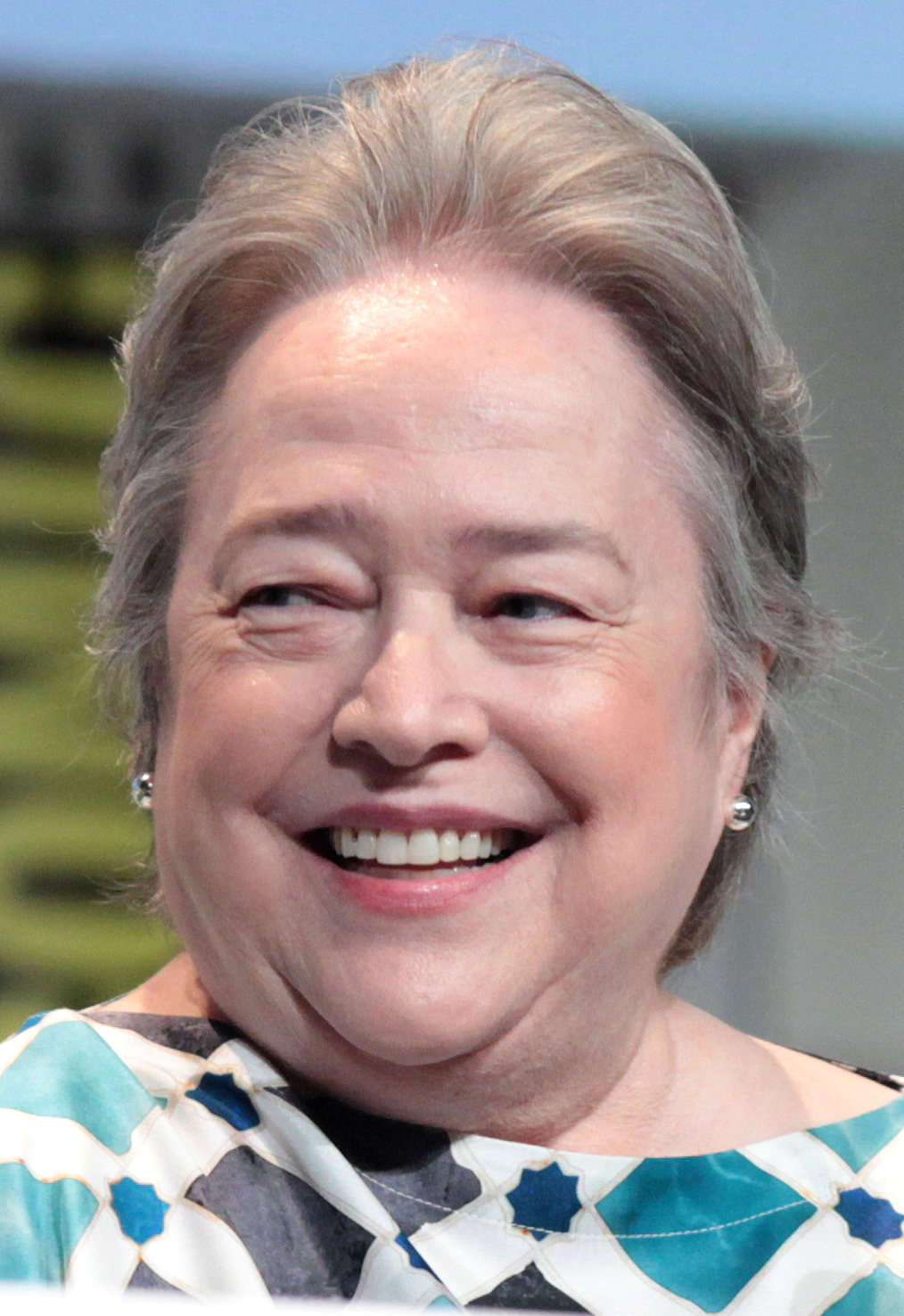
Kathy Bates won for Primary Colors (1998).

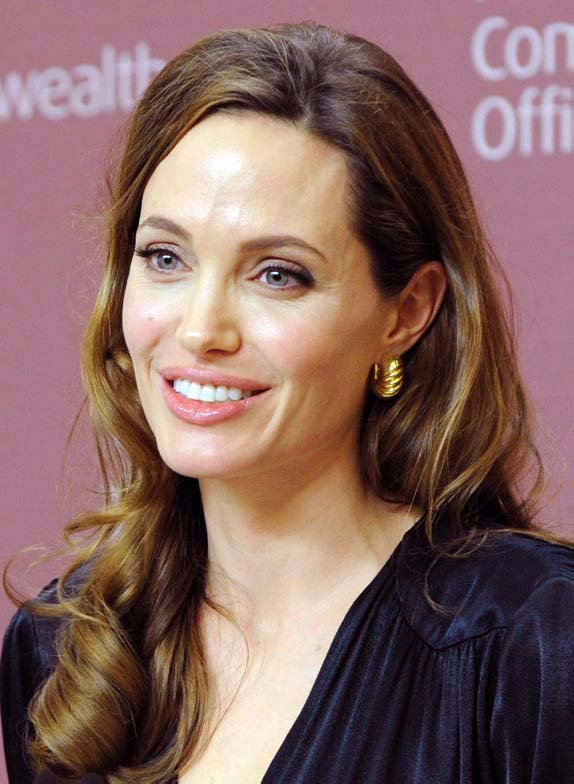
Angelina Jolie won for Girl, Interrupted (1999).

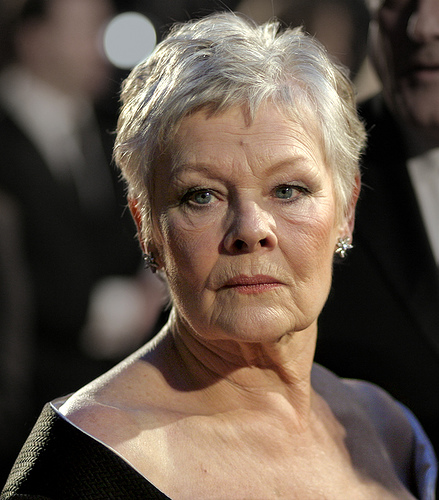
Judi Dench won for Chocolat (2000).

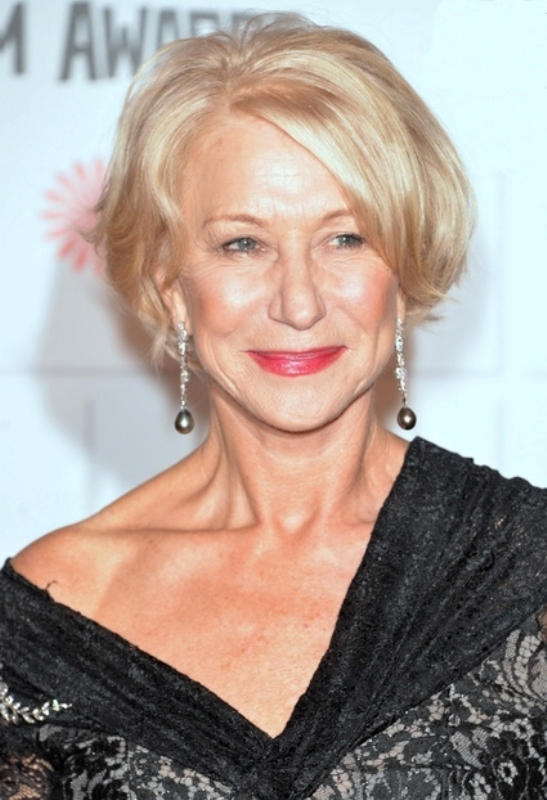
Helen Mirren won for Gosford Park (2001).

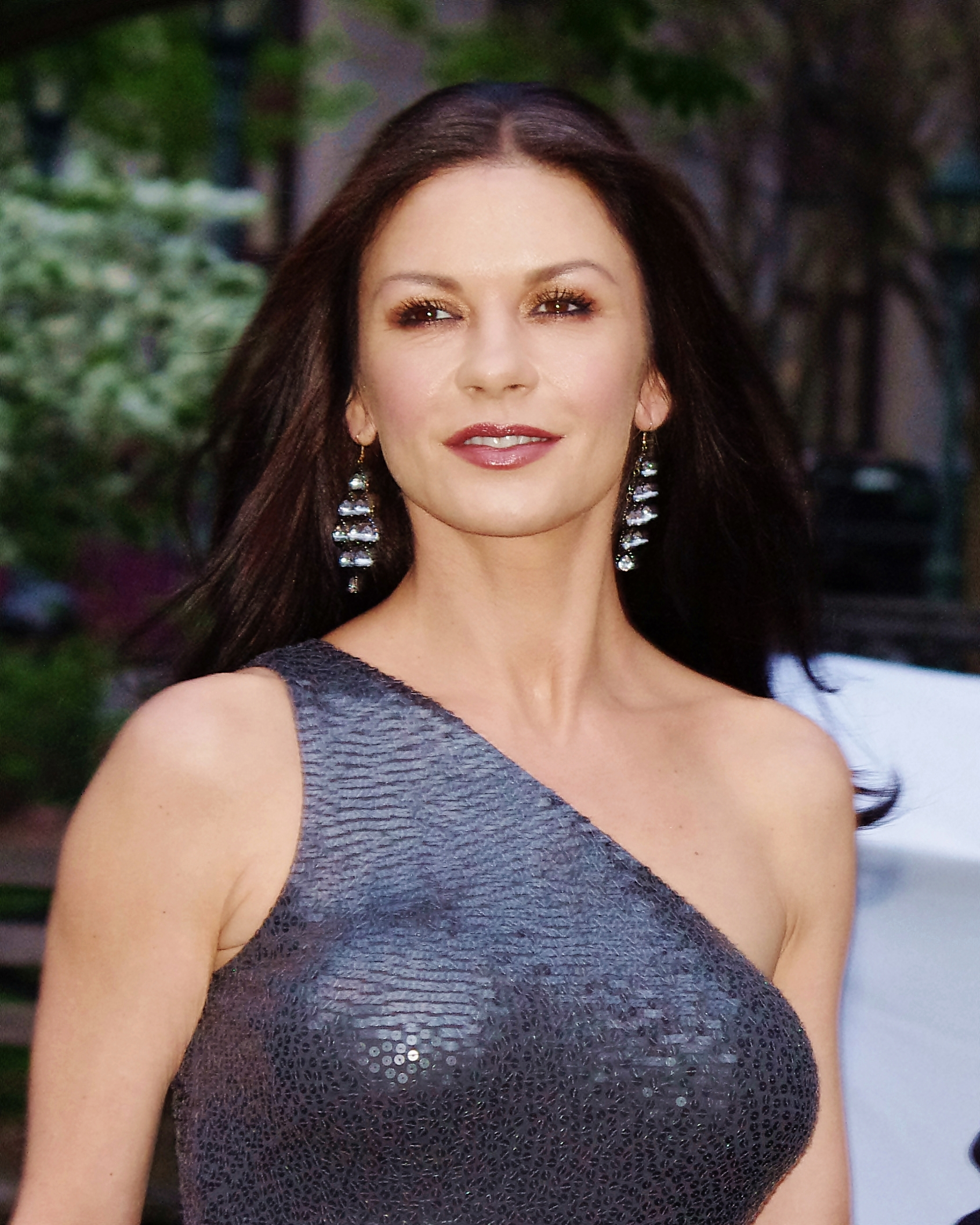
Catherine Zeta-Jones won for Chicago (2002).

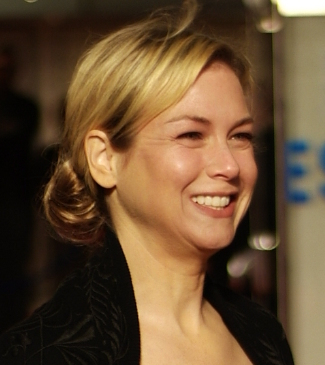
Renée Zellweger won for Cold Mountain (2003).

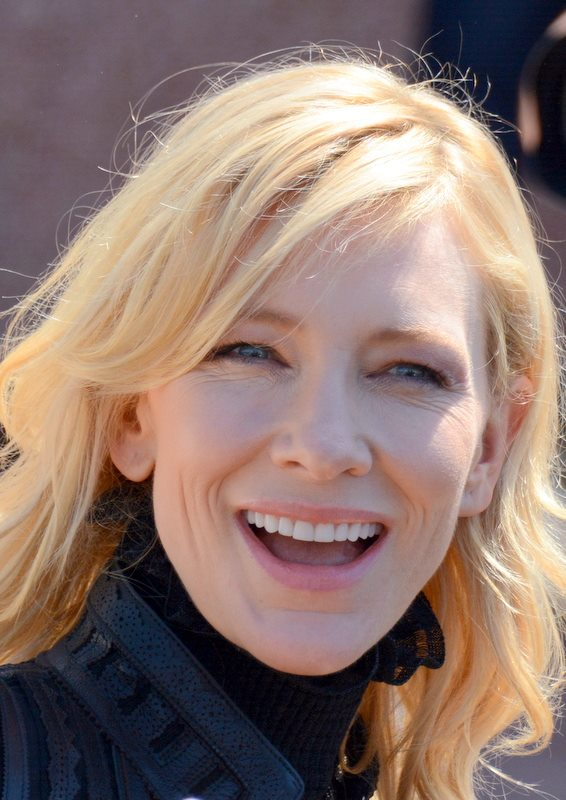
Cate Blanchett won for The Aviator (2004)

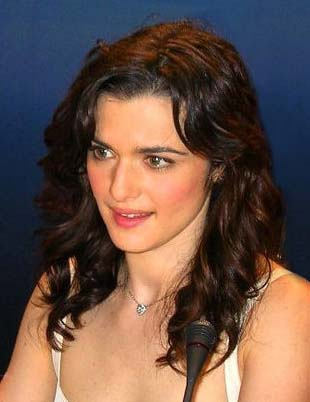
Rachel Weisz won for The Constant Gardener (2005).

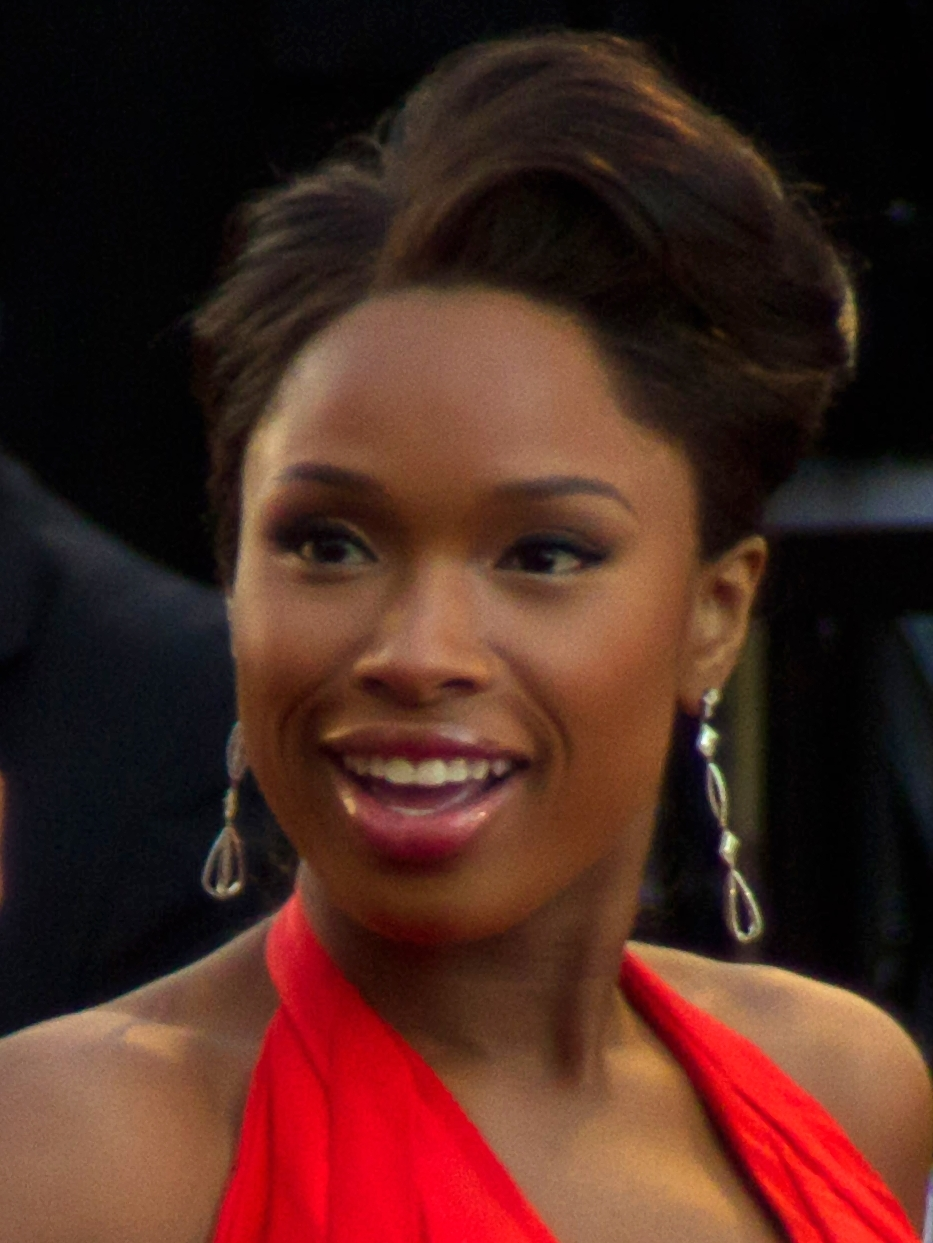
Jennifer Hudson won for Dreamgirls (2006).

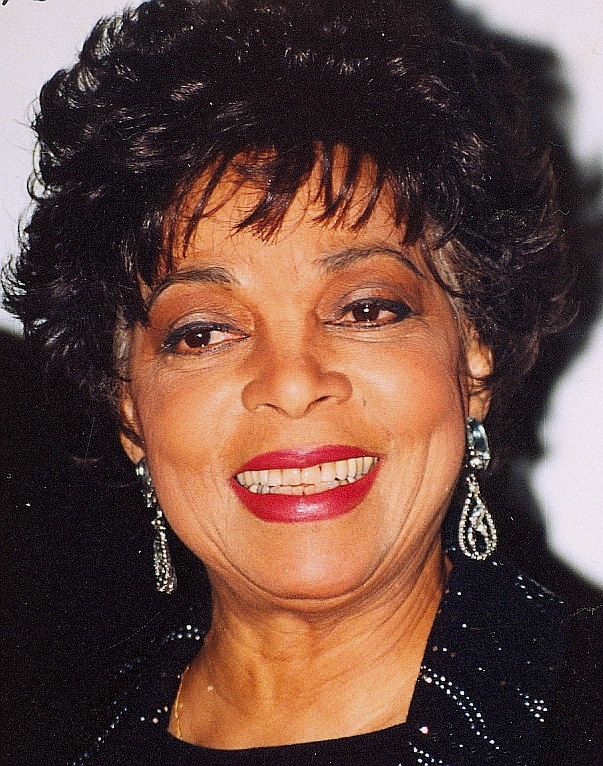
Ruby Dee won for American Gangster (2007).

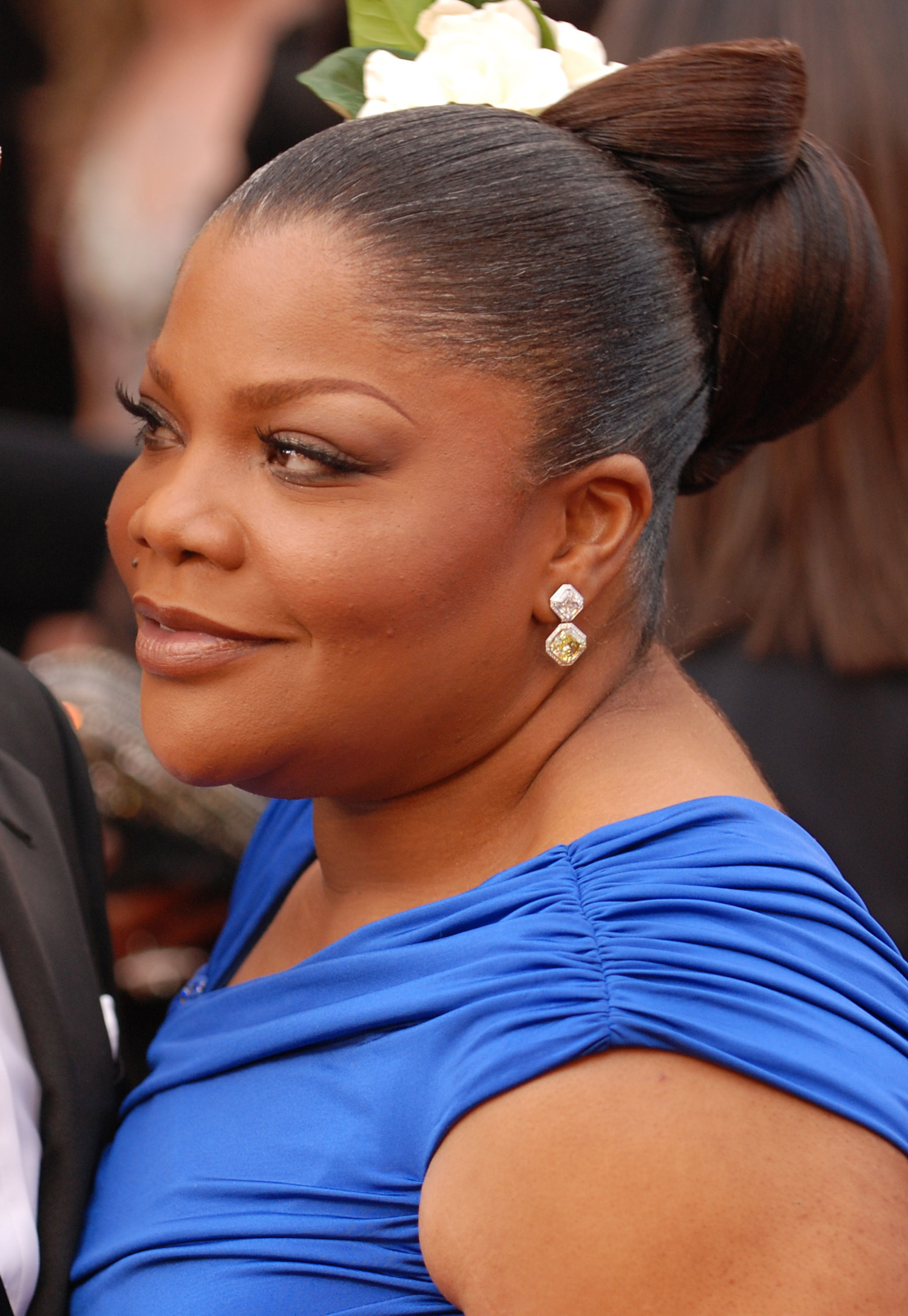
Mo'Nique won for Precious (2009).

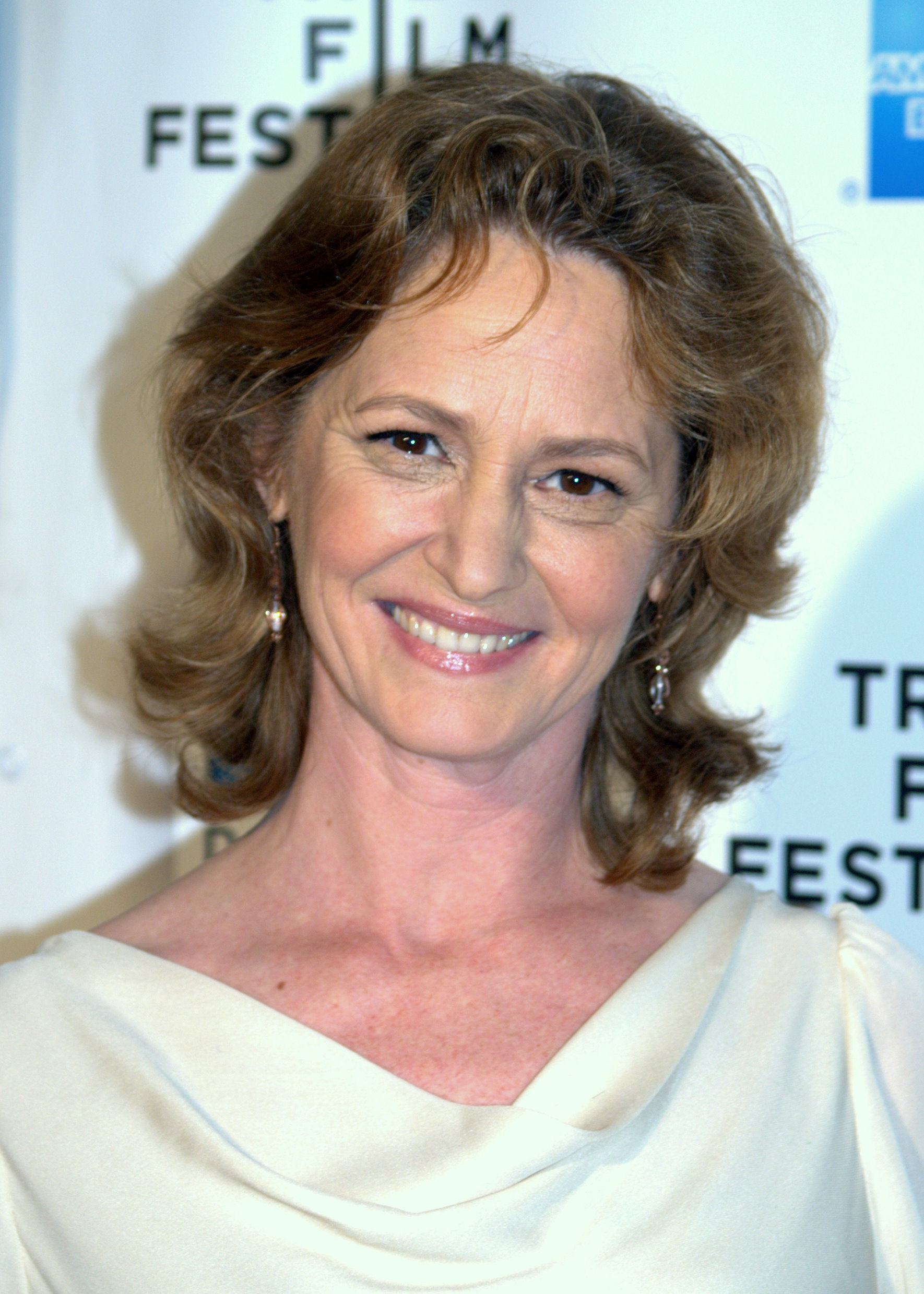
Melissa Leo won for The Fighter (2010).

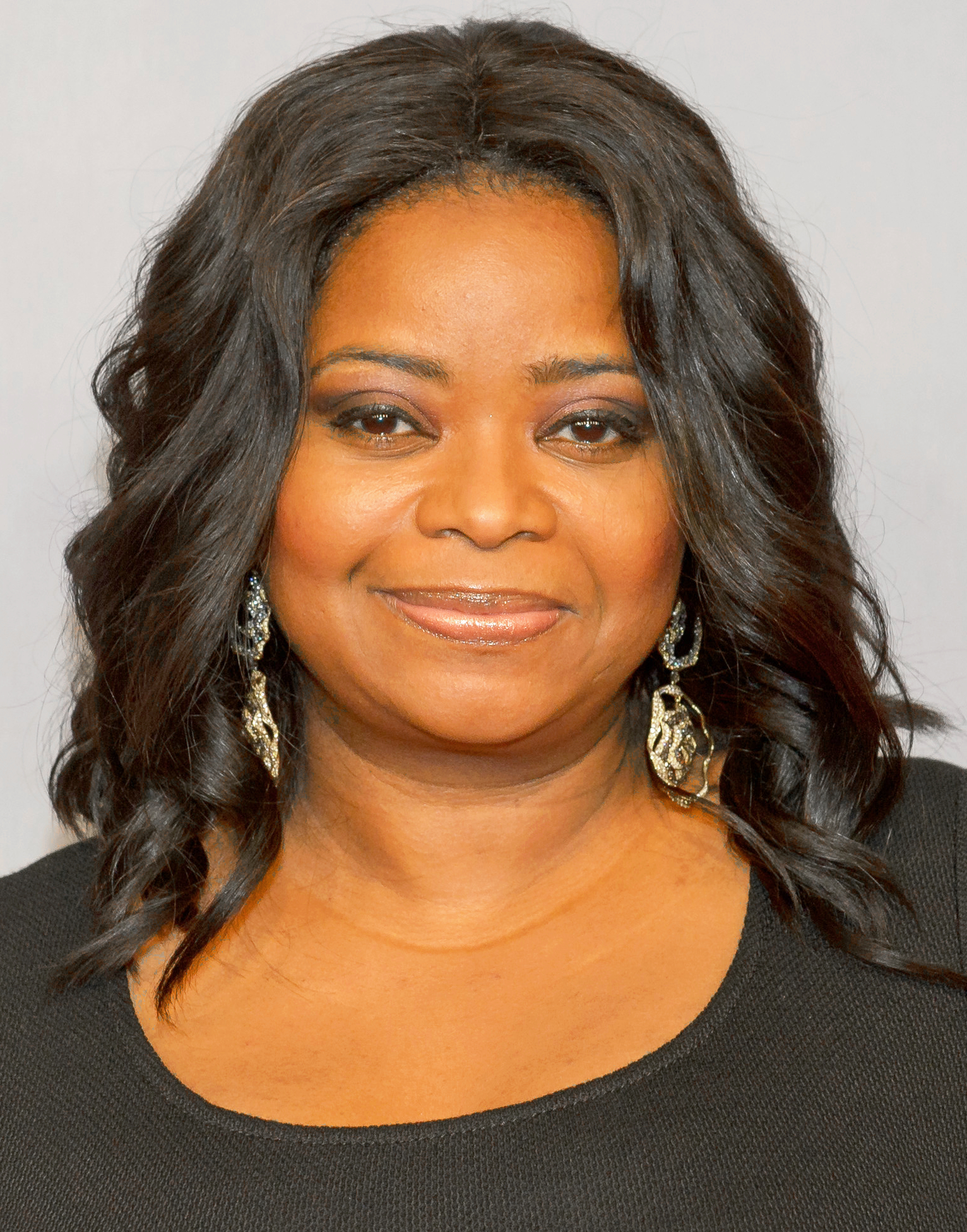
Octavia Spencer won for The Help (2011).

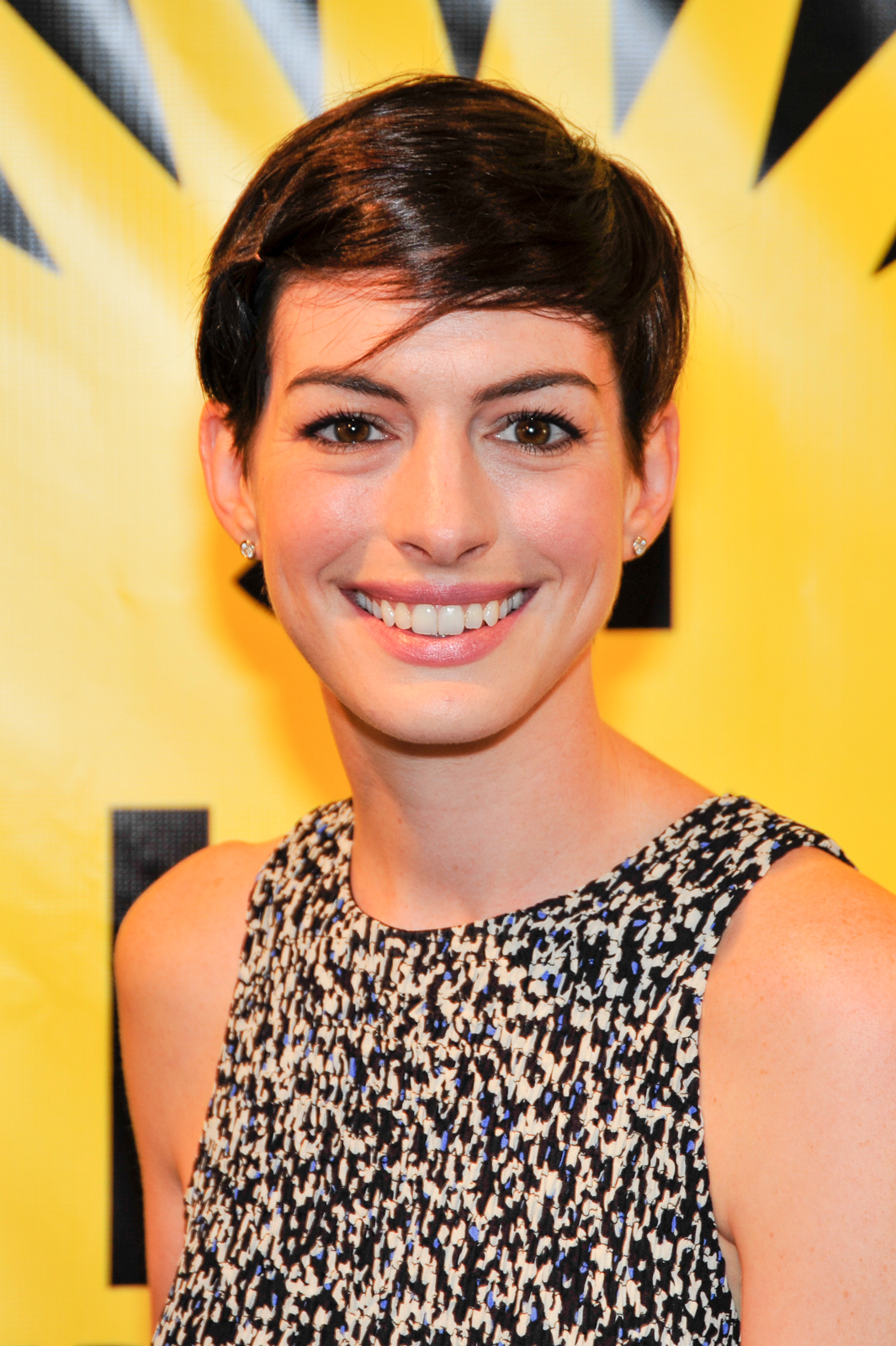
Anne Hathaway won for Les Misérables (2012).

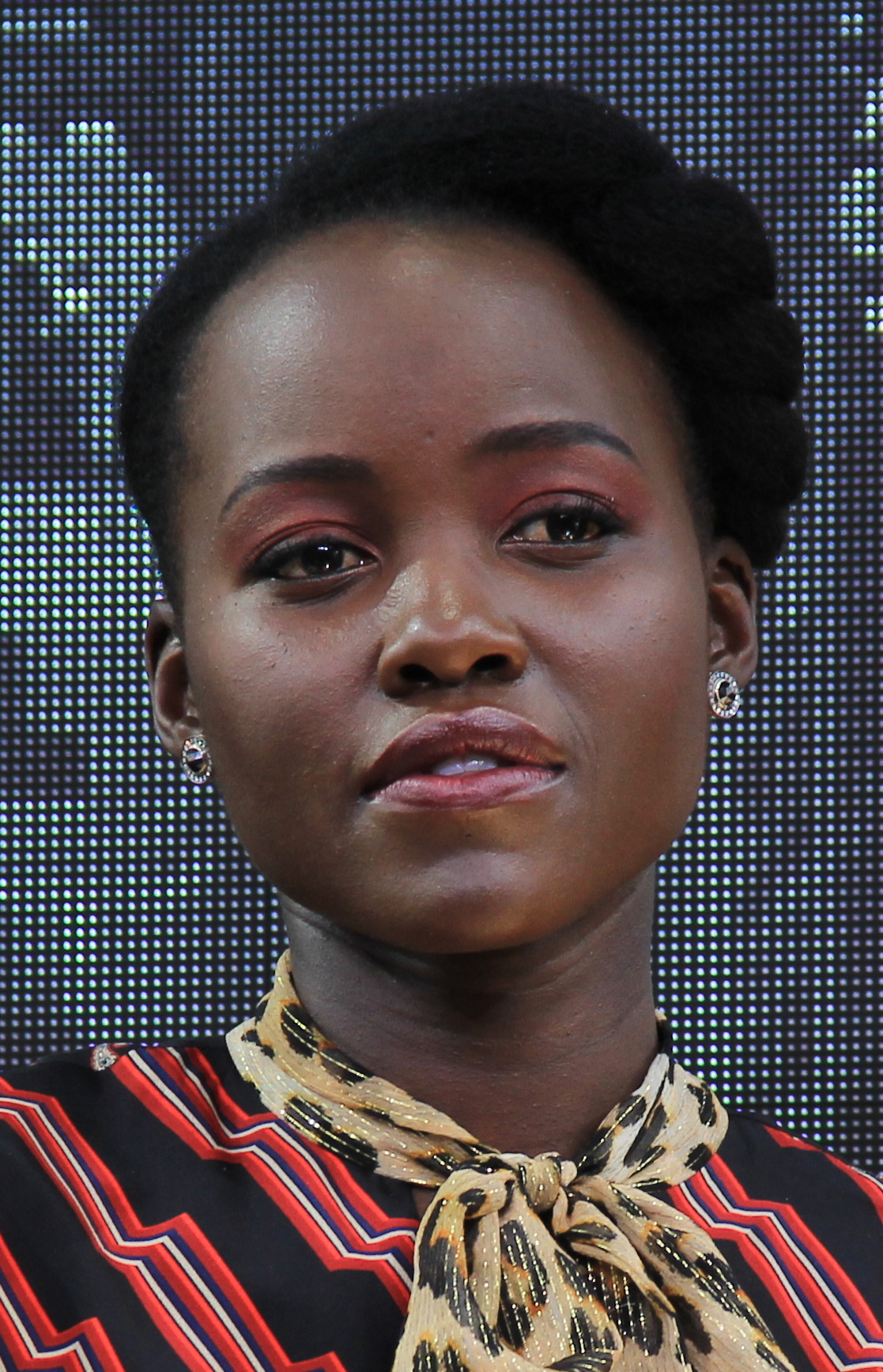
Lupita Nyong'o won for 12 Years a Slave (2013).

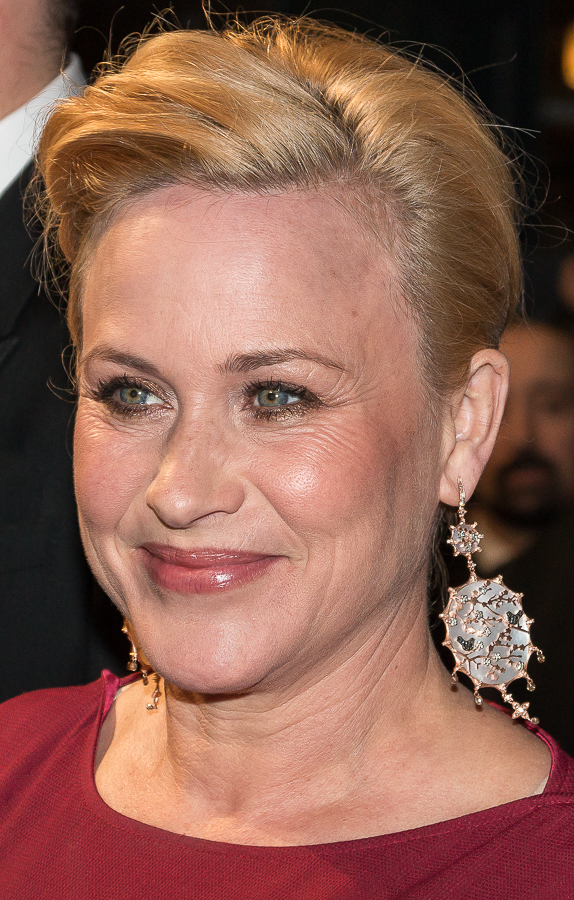
Patricia Arquette won for Boyhood (2014).

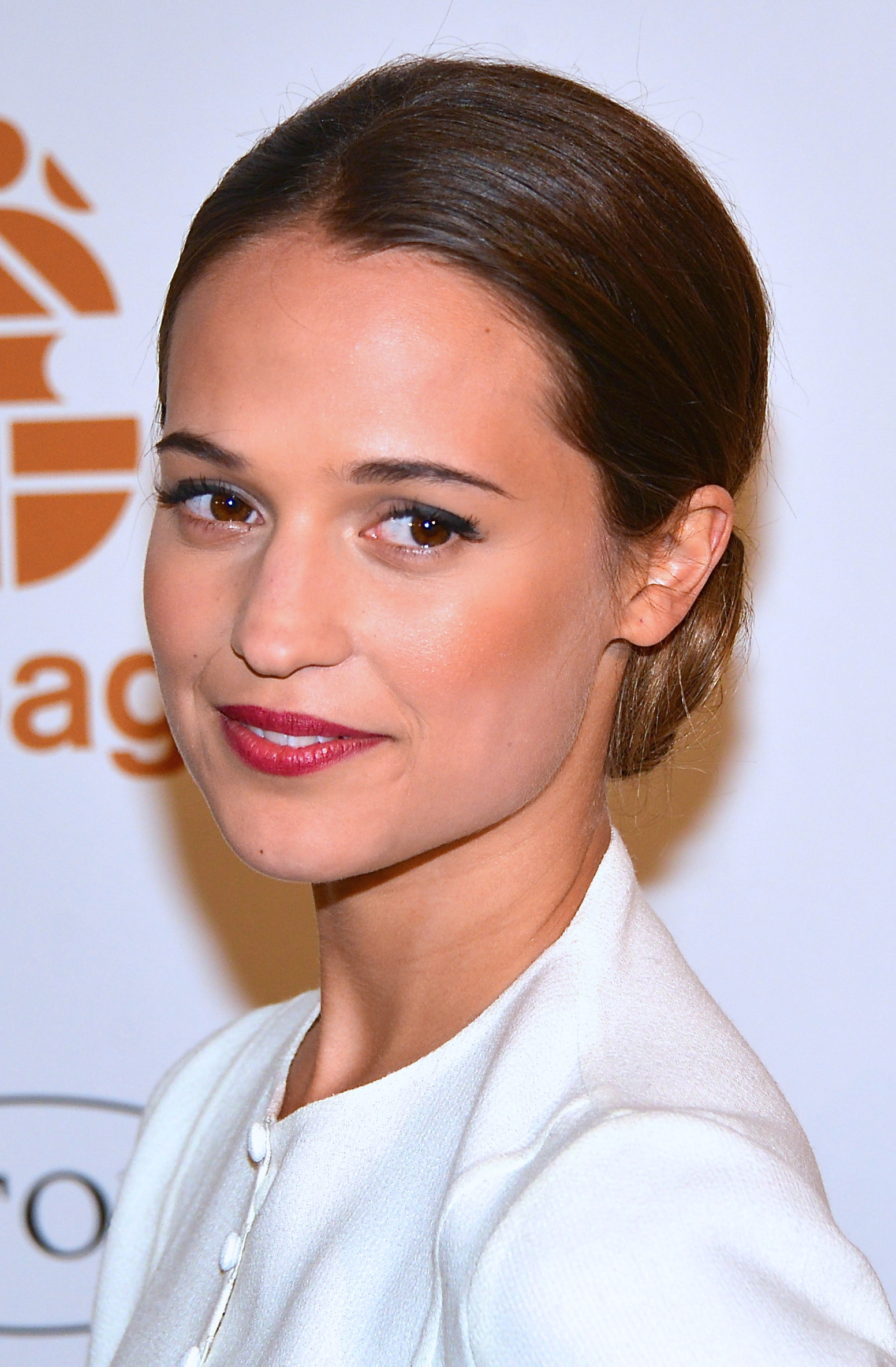
Alicia Vikander won for The Danish Girl (2015).

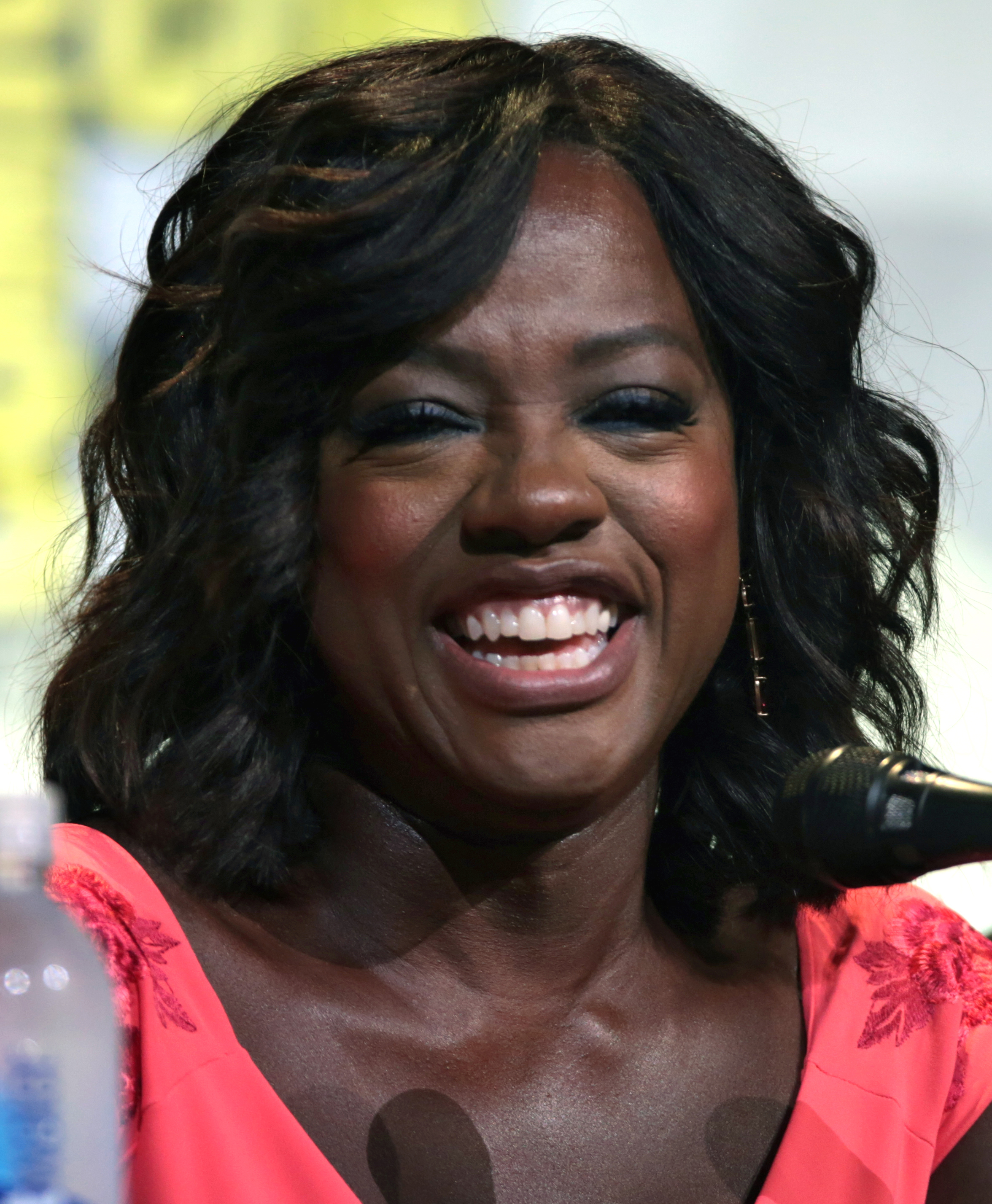
Viola Davis won for Fences (2016).

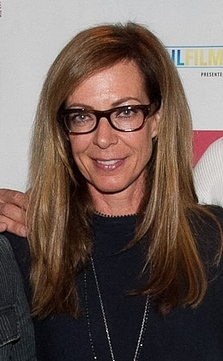
Allison Janney won for I, Tonya (2017).

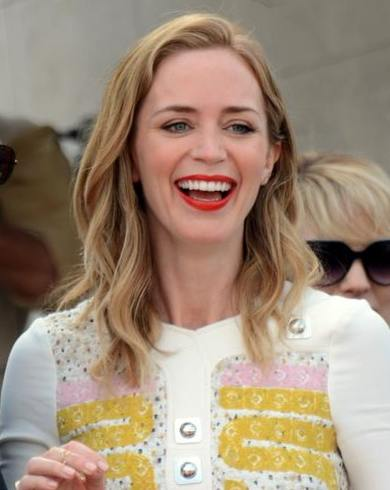
Emily Blunt won for A Quiet Place (2018).

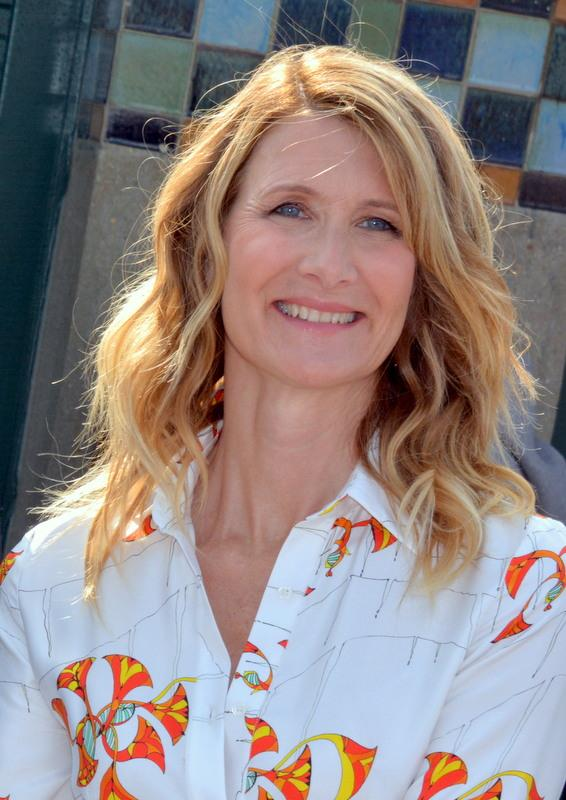
Laura Dern won for Marriage Story (2019).

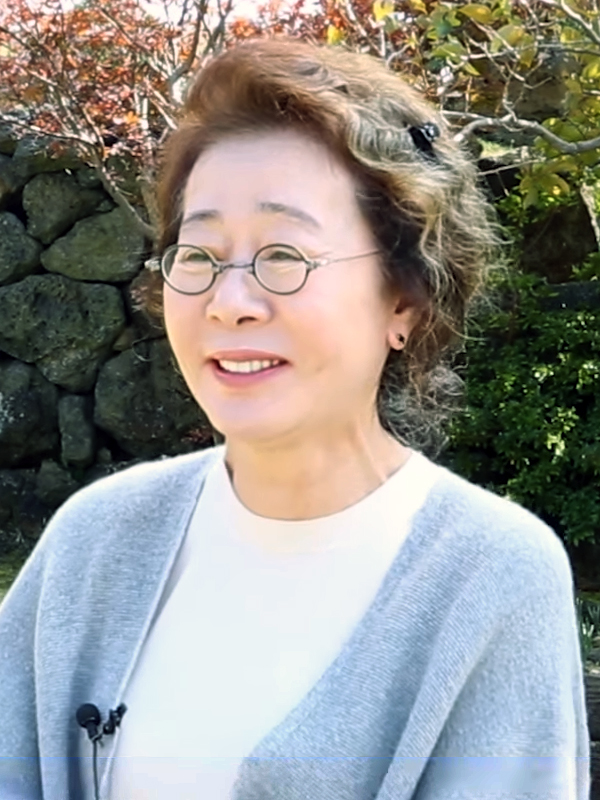
Yuh-jung Youn won for Minari (2020).

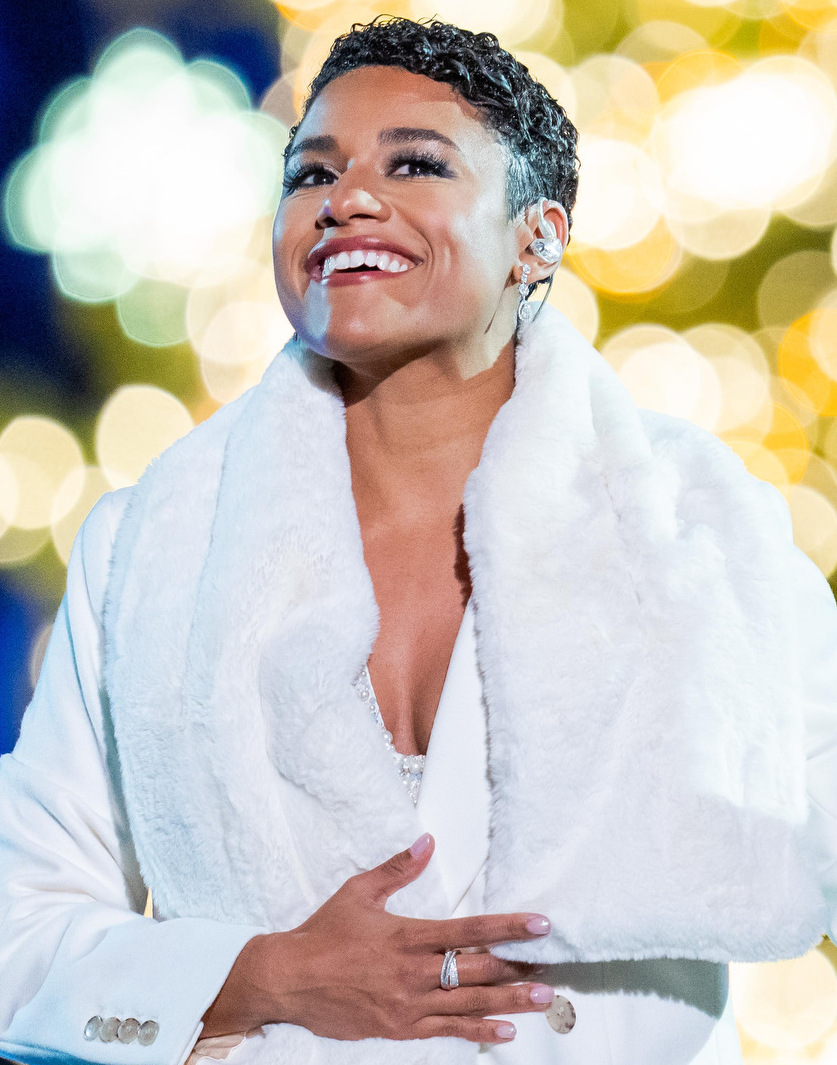
Ariana DeBose won for West Side Story (2021).

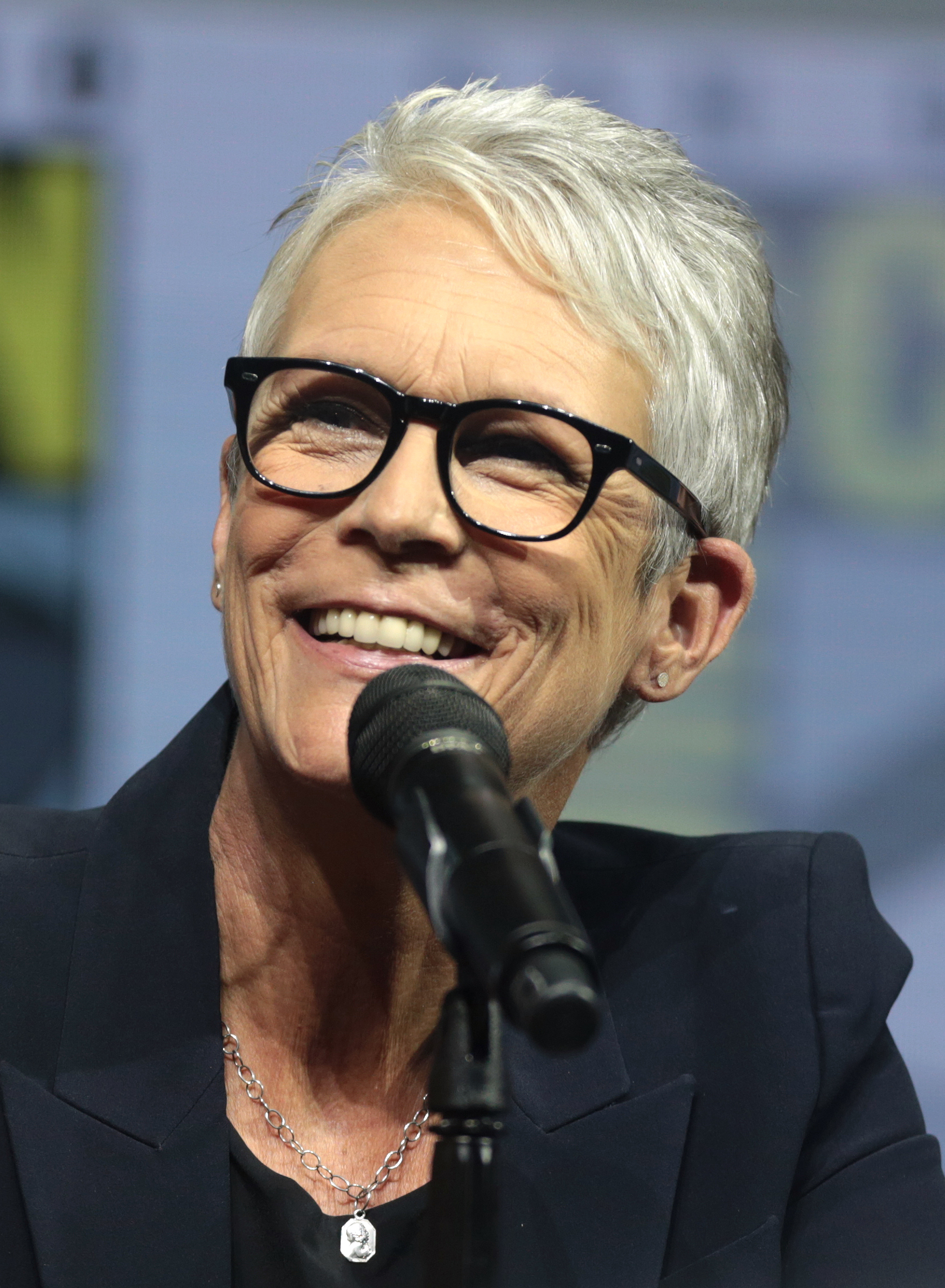
Jamie Lee Curtis won for Everything Everywhere All at Once (2022).

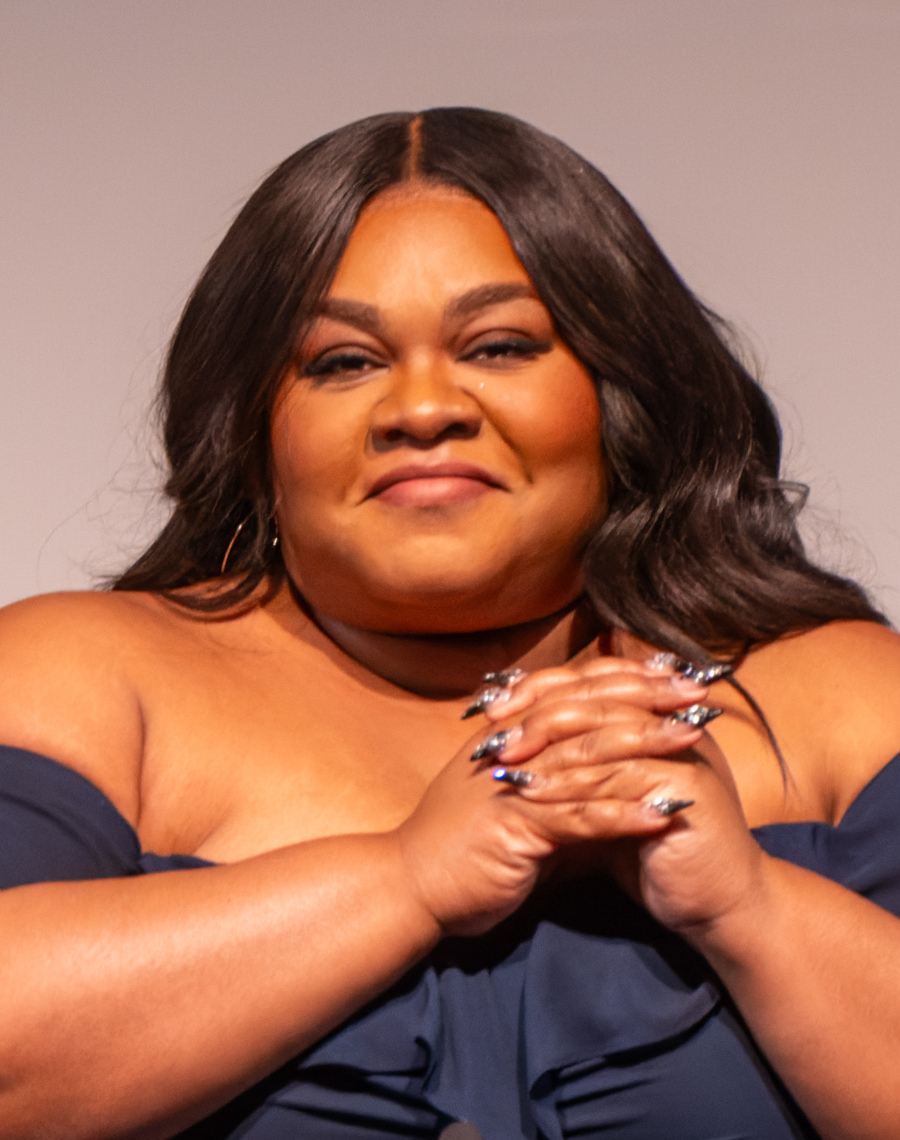
Da'Vine Joy Randolph won for The Holdovers (2023).

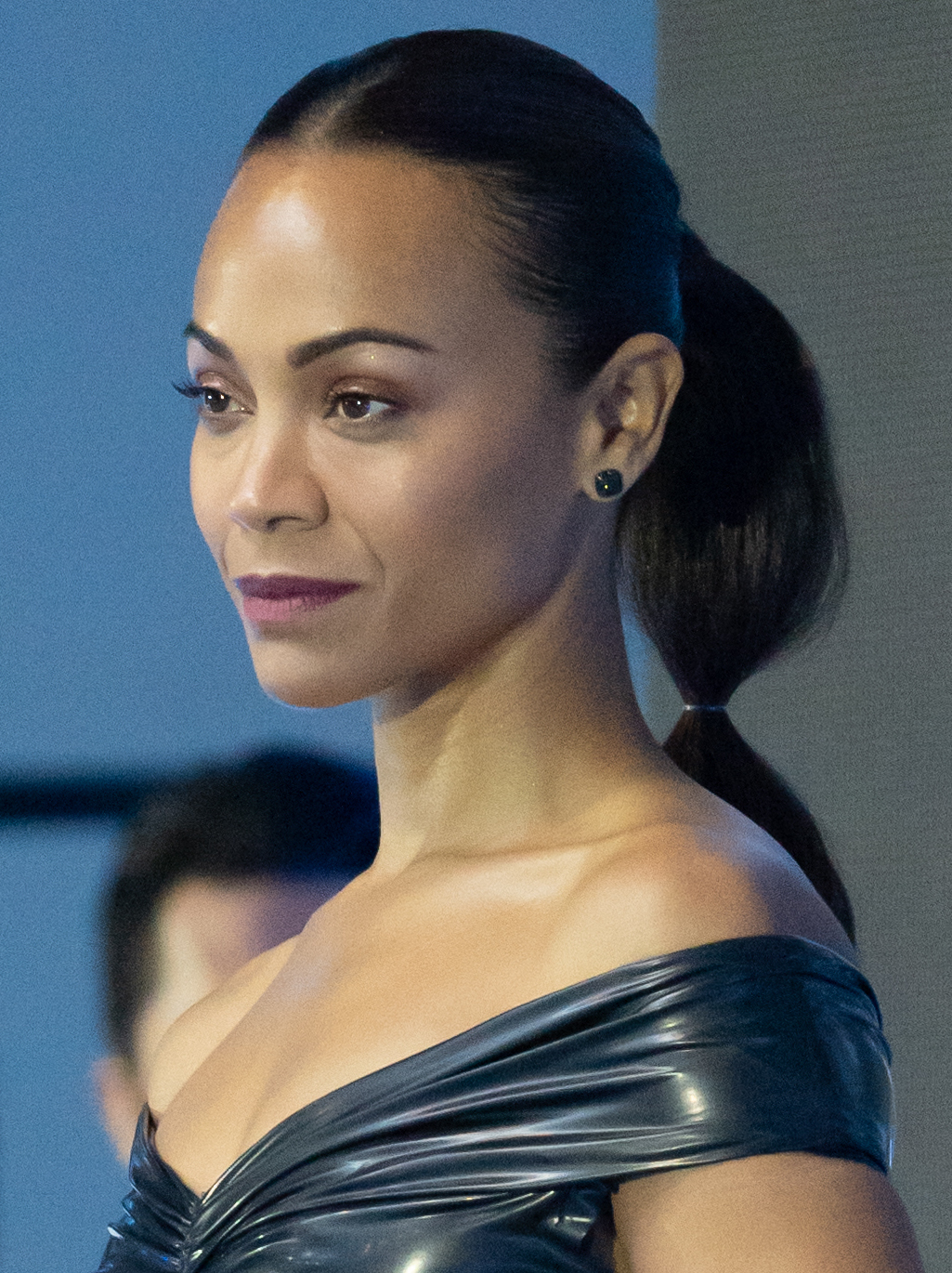
Zoe Saldaña won for Emilia Pérez (2024).

Table key
	Indicates the winner
‡	Indicates the Academy Award winner

=== 1990s ===
Year	Actress	Film	Role(s)	Ref.
1994 (1st)	Dianne Wiest ‡	Bullets over Broadway	Helen Sinclair	
1994 (1st)	Jamie Lee Curtis	True Lies	Helen Tasker	
1994 (1st)	Sally Field	Forrest Gump	Mrs. Gump	
1994 (1st)	Uma Thurman	Pulp Fiction	Mia Wallace	
1994 (1st)	Robin Wright	Forrest Gump	Jenifer "Jenny" Curran	
1995 (2nd)	Kate Winslet	Sense and Sensibility	Marianne Dashwood	
1995 (2nd)	Stockard Channing	Smoke	Ruby McNutt	
1995 (2nd)	Anjelica Huston	The Crossing Guard	Mary Tyler	
1995 (2nd)	Mira Sorvino ‡	Mighty Aphrodite	Linda Ash	
1995 (2nd)	Mare Winningham	Georgia	Georgia Flood	
1996 (3rd)	Lauren Bacall	The Mirror Has Two Faces	Hannah Morgan	
1996 (3rd)	Juliette Binoche ‡	The English Patient	Hana	
1996 (3rd)	Marisa Tomei	Unhook the Stars	Monica Warren	
1996 (3rd)	Gwen Verdon	Marvin's Room	Ruth Abanathy	
1996 (3rd)	Renée Zellweger	Jerry Maguire	Dorothy Boyd	
1997 (4th)	Kim Basinger ‡ (TIE)	L.A. Confidential	Lynn Bracken	
1997 (4th)	Gloria Stuart (TIE)	Titanic	Rose Calvert	
1997 (4th)	Minnie Driver	Good Will Hunting	Skylar Jackson	
1997 (4th)	Alison Elliott	The Wings of the Dove	Millie Theale	
1997 (4th)	Julianne Moore	Boogie Nights	Amber Waves	
1998 (5th)	Kathy Bates	Primary Colors	Libby Holden	
1998 (5th)	Brenda Blethyn	Little Voice	Mari Hoff	
1998 (5th)	Judi Dench ‡	Shakespeare in Love	Queen Elizabeth I	
1998 (5th)	Rachel Griffiths	Hilary and Jackie	Hilary du Pré	
1998 (5th)	Lynn Redgrave	Gods and Monsters	Hanna	
1999 (6th)	Angelina Jolie ‡	Girl, Interrupted	Lisa Rowe	
1999 (6th)	Cameron Diaz	Being John Malkovich	Lotte Schwartz	
1999 (6th)	Catherine Keener	Being John Malkovich	Maxine Lund	
1999 (6th)	Julianne Moore	Magnolia	Linda Partridge	
1999 (6th)	Chloë Sevigny	Boys Don't Cry	Lana Tisdel	

=== 2000s ===
Year	Actress	Film	Role(s)	Ref.
2000 (7th)	Judi Dench	Chocolat	Armande Voizin	
2000 (7th)	Kate Hudson	Almost Famous	Penny Lane	
2000 (7th)	Frances McDormand	Almost Famous	Elaine Miller	
2000 (7th)	Julie Walters	Billy Elliot	Mrs. Wilkinson	
2000 (7th)	Kate Winslet	Quills	Madeleine "Maddy" LeClerc	
2001 (8th)	Helen Mirren	Gosford Park	Mrs. Wilson	
2001 (8th)	Cate Blanchett	Bandits	Kate Wheeler	
2001 (8th)	Judi Dench	The Shipping News	Agnis Hamm	
2001 (8th)	Cameron Diaz	Vanilla Sky	Julianna "Julie" Gianni	
2001 (8th)	Dakota Fanning	I Am Sam	Lucy Dawson	
2002 (9th)	Catherine Zeta-Jones ‡	Chicago	Velma Kelly	
2002 (9th)	Kathy Bates	About Schmidt	Roberta Hertzel	
2002 (9th)	Queen Latifah	Chicago	Matron "Mama" Morton"	
2002 (9th)	Julianne Moore	The Hours	Laura Brown	
2002 (9th)	Michelle Pfeiffer	White Oleander	Ingrid Magnussen	
2003 (10th)	Renée Zellweger ‡	Cold Mountain	Ruby Thewes	
2003 (10th)	Maria Bello	The Cooler	Natalie Belisario	
2003 (10th)	Keisha Castle-Hughes	Whale Rider	Paike Apirana	
2003 (10th)	Patricia Clarkson	Pieces of April	Joy Burns	
2003 (10th)	Holly Hunter	Thirteen	Melanie Freeland	
2004 (11th)	Cate Blanchett ‡	The Aviator	Katharine Hepburn	
2004 (11th)	Cloris Leachman	Spanglish	Evelyn Wright	
2004 (11th)	Laura Linney	Kinsey	Clara McMillen	
2004 (11th)	Virginia Madsen	Sideways	Maya Randall	
2004 (11th)	Sophie Okonedo	Hotel Rwanda	Tatiana Rusesabagina	
2005 (12th)	Rachel Weisz ‡	The Constant Gardener	Tessa Quayle	
2005 (12th)	Amy Adams	Junebug	Ashley Johnsten	
2005 (12th)	Catherine Keener	Capote	Nelle Harper Lee	
2005 (12th)	Frances McDormand	North Country	Glory Dodge	
2005 (12th)	Michelle Williams	Brokeback Mountain	Alma Beers Del Mar	
2006 (13th)	Jennifer Hudson ‡	Dreamgirls	Effie White	
2006 (13th)	Adriana Barraza	Babel	Amelia Hernández	
2006 (13th)	Cate Blanchett	Notes on a Scandal	Sheba Hart	
2006 (13th)	Abigail Breslin	Little Miss Sunshine	Olive Hoover	
2006 (13th)	Rinko Kikuchi	Babel	Chieko Wataya	
2007 (14th)	Ruby Dee	American Gangster	Mahalee Lucas	
2007 (14th)	Cate Blanchett	I'm Not There	Jude Quinn	
2007 (14th)	Catherine Keener	Into the Wild	Jan Burres	
2007 (14th)	Amy Ryan	Gone Baby Gone	Helene McCready	
2007 (14th)	Tilda Swinton ‡	Michael Clayton	Karen Crowder	
2008 (15th)	Kate Winslet ‡ won Academy Award for Best Actress	The Reader	Hanna Schmitz	
2008 (15th)	Amy Adams	Doubt	Sister James	
2008 (15th)	Penélope Cruz ‡	Vicky Cristina Barcelona	María Elena	
2008 (15th)	Viola Davis	Doubt	Mrs. Miller	
2008 (15th)	Taraji P. Henson	The Curious Case of Benjamin Button	Queenie Jackson	
2009 (16th)	Mo'Nique ‡	Precious	Mary Lee Johnston	
2009 (16th)	Penélope Cruz	Nine	Carla Albanese	
2009 (16th)	Vera Farmiga	Up in the Air	Alex Goran	
2009 (16th)	Anna Kendrick	Up in the Air	Natalie Keener	
2009 (16th)	Diane Kruger	Inglourious Basterds	Bridget von Hammersmark	

=== 2010s ===
Year	Actress	Film	Role(s)	Ref.
2010 (17th)	Melissa Leo ‡	The Fighter	Alice Eklund-Ward	
2010 (17th)	Amy Adams	The Fighter	Charlene Fleming	
2010 (17th)	Helena Bonham Carter	The King's Speech	Queen Elizabeth	
2010 (17th)	Mila Kunis	Black Swan	Lily	
2010 (17th)	Hailee Steinfeld	True Grit	Mattie Ross	
2011 (18th)	Octavia Spencer ‡	The Help	Minny Jackson	
2011 (18th)	Bérénice Bejo	The Artist	Peppy Miller	
2011 (18th)	Jessica Chastain	The Help	Celia Rae Foote	
2011 (18th)	Melissa McCarthy	Bridesmaids	Megan Price	
2011 (18th)	Janet McTeer	Albert Nobbs	Hubert Page	
2012 (19th)	Anne Hathaway ‡	Les Misérables	Fantine	
2012 (19th)	Sally Field	Lincoln	Mary Todd Lincoln	
2012 (19th)	Helen Hunt	The Sessions	Cheryl Cohen-Greene	
2012 (19th)	Nicole Kidman	The Paperboy	Charlotte Bless	
2012 (19th)	Maggie Smith	The Best Exotic Marigold Hotel	Muriel Donnelly	
2013 (20th)	Lupita Nyong'o ‡	12 Years a Slave	Patsey	
2013 (20th)	Jennifer Lawrence	American Hustle	Rosalyn Rosenfeld	
2013 (20th)	Julia Roberts	August: Osage County	Barbara Weston-Fordham	
2013 (20th)	June Squibb	Nebraska	Kate Grant	
2013 (20th)	Oprah Winfrey	The Butler	Gloria Gaines	
2014 (21st)	Patricia Arquette ‡	Boyhood	Olivia Evans	
2014 (21st)	Keira Knightley	The Imitation Game	Joan Clarke	
2014 (21st)	Emma Stone	Birdman	Sam Thomson	
2014 (21st)	Meryl Streep	Into the Woods	The Witch	
2014 (21st)	Naomi Watts	St. Vincent	Daka Parimova	
2015 (22nd)	Alicia Vikander ‡	The Danish Girl	Gerda Wegener	
2015 (22nd)	Rooney Mara	Carol	Therese Belivet	
2015 (22nd)	Rachel McAdams	Spotlight	Sacha Pfeiffer	
2015 (22nd)	Helen Mirren	Trumbo	Hedda Hopper	
2015 (22nd)	Kate Winslet	Steve Jobs	Joanna Hoffman	
2016 (23rd)	Viola Davis ‡	Fences	Rose Maxson	
2016 (23rd)	Naomie Harris	Moonlight	Paula Harris	
2016 (23rd)	Nicole Kidman	Lion	Sue Brierley	
2016 (23rd)	Octavia Spencer	Hidden Figures	Dorothy Vaughan	
2016 (23rd)	Michelle Williams	Manchester by the Sea	Randi Chandler	
2017 (24th)	Allison Janney ‡	I, Tonya	LaVona Golden	
2017 (24th)	Mary J. Blige	Mudbound	Florence Jackson	
2017 (24th)	Hong Chau	Downsizing	Ngoc Lan Tran	
2017 (24th)	Holly Hunter	The Big Sick	Beth Gardner	
2017 (24th)	Laurie Metcalf	Lady Bird	Marion McPherson	
2018 (25th)	Emily Blunt	A Quiet Place	Evelyn Abbott	
2018 (25th)	Amy Adams	Vice	Lynne Cheney	
2018 (25th)	Margot Robbie	Mary Queen of Scots	Queen Elizabeth I	
2018 (25th)	Emma Stone	The Favourite	Abigail	
2018 (25th)	Rachel Weisz	The Favourite	Lady Sarah	
2019 (26th)	Laura Dern ‡	Marriage Story	Nora Fanshaw	
2019 (26th)	Scarlett Johansson	Jojo Rabbit	Rosie Betzler	
2019 (26th)	Nicole Kidman	Bombshell	Gretchen Carlson	
2019 (26th)	Jennifer Lopez	Hustlers	Ramona Vega	
2019 (26th)	Margot Robbie	Bombshell	Kayla Pospisil	

=== 2020s ===
Year	Actress	Film	Role(s)	Ref.
2020 (27th)	Yuh-jung Youn ‡	Minari	Soon-ja	
2020 (27th)	Maria Bakalova	Borat Subsequent Moviefilm	Tutar Sagdiyev	
2020 (27th)	Glenn Close	Hillbilly Elegy	Bonnie "Mamaw" Vance	
2020 (27th)	Olivia Colman	The Father	Anne	
2020 (27th)	Helena Zengel	News of the World	Johanna Leonberger	
2021 (28th)	Ariana DeBose ‡	West Side Story	Anita	
2021 (28th)	Caitríona Balfe	Belfast	Ma	
2021 (28th)	Cate Blanchett	Nightmare Alley	Lilith Ritter	
2021 (28th)	Kirsten Dunst	The Power of the Dog	Rose Gordon	
2021 (28th)	Ruth Negga	Passing	Clare Bellew	
2022 (29th)	Jamie Lee Curtis ‡	Everything Everywhere All at Once	Deirdre Beaubeirdre	
2022 (29th)	Angela Bassett	Black Panther: Wakanda Forever	Queen Ramonda	
2022 (29th)	Hong Chau	The Whale	Liz	
2022 (29th)	Kerry Condon	The Banshees of Inisherin	Siobhán Súilleabháin	
2022 (29th)	Stephanie Hsu	Everything Everywhere All at Once	Joy Wang / Jobu Tupaki	
2023 (30th)	Da'Vine Joy Randolph ‡	The Holdovers	Mary Lamb	
2023 (30th)	Emily Blunt	Oppenheimer	Kitty Oppenheimer	
2023 (30th)	Danielle Brooks	The Color Purple	Sofia	
2023 (30th)	Penélope Cruz	Ferrari	Laura Ferrari	
2023 (30th)	Jodie Foster	Nyad	Bonnie Stoll	
2024 (31st)	Zoe Saldaña ‡	Emilia Pérez	Rita Mora Castro	
2024 (31st)	Monica Barbaro	A Complete Unknown	Joan Baez	
2024 (31st)	Jamie Lee Curtis	The Last Showgirl	Annette	
2024 (31st)	Danielle Deadwyler	The Piano Lesson	Berniece Charles	
2024 (31st)	Ariana Grande	Wicked	Galinda "Glinda" Upland	
2025 (32nd)	Amy Madigan ‡	Weapons	Gladys	
2025 (32nd)	Odessa A'zion	Marty Supreme	Rachel Mizler	
2025 (32nd)	Ariana Grande	Wicked: For Good	Galinda "Glinda" Upland	
2025 (32nd)	Wunmi Mosaku	Sinners	Annie	
2025 (32nd)	Teyana Taylor	One Battle After Another	Perfidia Beverly Hills	

== Superlatives ==
Superlative	Leading Actress		Supporting Actress		Overall	
Actress with most awards	Viola Davis, Frances McDormand, Renée Zellweger	2	Kate Winslet	2	Viola Davis, Renée Zellweger	3
Actress with most nominations	Meryl Streep	10	Cate Blanchett	5	Meryl Streep	11
Actress with most nominations without ever winning	Judi Dench	6	Amy Adams	4	Amy Adams, Nicole Kidman	6
Film with most nominations	—		Almost Famous, Babel, Being John Malkovich, Bombshell, Chicago, Doubt, Everything Everywhere All at Once, The Favourite, The Fighter, Forrest Gump, The Help, Up in the Air	2	Bombshell, Chicago, Doubt, Everything Everywhere All at Once, The Favourite, The Help	3
Oldest winner	Glenn Close (The Wife, 2019)	71	Gloria Stuart (Titanic, 1998)	87	Gloria Stuart (Titanic, 1998)	87
Oldest nominee	Judi Dench (Victoria & Abdul, 2018)	83	Gloria Stuart (Titanic, 1998)	87	Gloria Stuart (Titanic, 1998)	87
Youngest winner	Jennifer Lawrence (Silver Linings Playbook, 2013)	22	Kate Winslet (Sense and Sensibility, 1996)	20	Kate Winslet (Sense and Sensibility, 1996)	20
Youngest nominee	Evan Rachel Wood (Thirteen, 2004)	16	Dakota Fanning (I Am Sam, 2002)	7	Dakota Fanning (I Am Sam, 2002)	7

== Multiple winners ==
Two awards

- Kate Winslet (Sense and Sensibility (1995), The Reader (2008))

== Multiple nominees ==
Note: Winners are indicated in bold type.

Two nominations

- Kathy Bates (**Primary Colors** (1998), About Schmidt (2002))
- Emily Blunt (**A Quiet Place** (2018), Oppenheimer (2023))
- Hong Chau (Downsizing (2017), The Whale (2022))
- Viola Davis (Doubt (2008), **Fences** (2016))
- Cameron Diaz (Being John Malkovich (1999), Vanilla Sky (2001))
- Sally Field (Forrest Gump (1994), Lincoln (2012))
- Ariana Grande (Wicked (2024), Wicked: For Good (2025))
- Holly Hunter (Thirteen (2003), The Big Sick (2017))
- Frances McDormand (Almost Famous (2000), North Country (2005))
- Helen Mirren (**Gosford Park** (2001), Trumbo (2015))
- Margot Robbie (Mary Queen of Scots (2018), Bombshell (2019))
- Octavia Spencer (**The Help** (2011), Hidden Figures (2016))
- Emma Stone (Birdman (2014), The Favourite (2018))
- Rachel Weisz (**The Constant Gardener** (2005), The Favourite (2018))
- Michelle Williams (Brokeback Mountain (2005), Manchester by the Sea (2016))
- Renée Zellweger (Jerry Maguire (1996), **Cold Mountain** (2003))

Three nominations

- Penélope Cruz (Vicky Cristina Barcelona (2008), Nine (2009), Ferrari (2023))
- Jamie Lee Curtis (True Lies (1994), **Everything Everywhere All at Once** (2022), The Last Showgirl (2024))
- Judi Dench (Shakespeare in Love (1998), **Chocolat** (2000), The Shipping News (2001))
- Catherine Keener (Being John Malkovich (1999), Capote (2005), Into the Wild (2007))
- Nicole Kidman (The Paperboy (2012), Lion (2016), Bombshell (2019))
- Julianne Moore (Boogie Nights (1997), Magnolia (1999), The Hours (2002))

Four nominations

- Amy Adams (Junebug (2005), Doubt (2008), The Fighter (2010), Vice (2018))
- Kate Winslet (**Sense and Sensibility** (1995), Quills (2000), **The Reader** (2008), Steve Jobs (2015))

Five nominations

- Cate Blanchett (Bandits (2001), **The Aviator** (2004), Notes on a Scandal (2006), I'm Not There (2007), Nightmare Alley (2021))

== See also ==
- Academy Award for Best Supporting Actress
- BAFTA Award for Best Actress in a Supporting Role
- Independent Spirit Award for Best Supporting Female
- Critics' Choice Movie Award for Best Supporting Actress
- Golden Globe Award for Best Supporting Actress – Motion Picture
