= List of awards and nominations received by Jamie Foxx =

Jamie Foxx awards and nominations
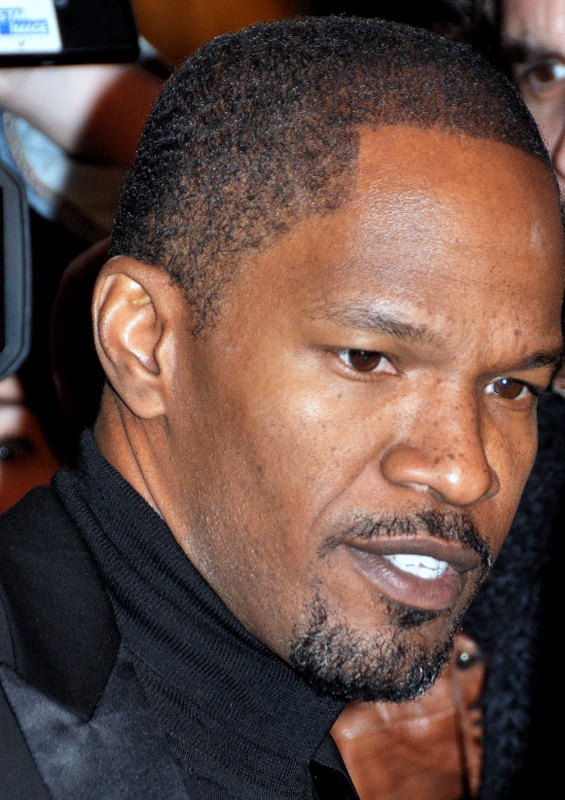
- Foxx in 2013
Awards and nominations
Award	Wins	Nominations
Golden Globe	1	4
Grammy	1	11
Academy Awards	1	2
BAFTA Awards	1	2
Screen Actors Guild Awards	1	5

This is a list of awards and nominations received by American actor, comedian, and singer Jamie Foxx.

== Major associations ==
=== Academy Awards ===
Year	Category	Nominated work	Result	Ref.
2005	Best Actor	Ray	Won	
2005	Best Supporting Actor	Collateral	Nominated	

=== British Academy Film Awards ===
Year	Category	Nominated work	Result	Ref.
2005	Best Actor in a Leading Role	Ray	Won	
2005	Best Actor in a Supporting Role	Collateral	Nominated	

=== Golden Globe Awards ===
Year	Category	Nominated work	Result	Ref.
2005	Best Actor in a Motion Picture – Musical or Comedy	Ray	Won	
2005	Best Supporting Actor – Motion Picture	Collateral	Nominated	
2005	Best Actor in a Miniseries or Television Film	Redemption: The Stan Tookie Williams Story	Nominated	
2025	Best Performance in Stand-Up Comedy on Television	Jamie Foxx: What Had Happened Was	Nominated	

=== Grammy Awards ===
Year	Category	Nominated work	Result	Ref.
2005	Best Rap/Sung Collaboration	"Slow Jamz" (with Twista & Kanye West)	Nominated	
2006	Best Male R&B Vocal Performance	"Creepin'"	Nominated	
2007	Best R&B Performance by a Duo or Group with Vocals	"Love Changes" (with Mary J. Blige)	Nominated	
2007	Best R&B Album	Unpredictable	Nominated	
2007	Best Rap Performance by a Duo or Group	"Georgia" (with Ludacris & Field Mob)	Nominated	
2007	Best Rap/Sung Collaboration	"Unpredictable" (featuring Ludacris)	Nominated	
2010	Best R&B Performance by a Duo or Group with Vocals	"Blame It" (featuring T-Pain)	Won	
2010	Best R&B Song	"Blame It"	Nominated	
2010	Best Contemporary R&B Album	Intuition	Nominated	
2023	Best Audio Book, Narration & Storytelling Recording	Act Like You Got Some Sense	Nominated	
2026	Best Comedy Album	What Had Happened Was...	Nominated	

=== Screen Actors Guild Awards ===
Year	Category	Nominated work	Result	Ref.
2005	Outstanding Performance by an Ensemble in a Motion Picture	Ray	Nominated	
2005	Outstanding Performance by a Male Actor in a Leading Role in a Motion Picture	Ray	Won	
2005	Outstanding Performance by a Male Actor in a Supporting Role in a Motion Picture	Collateral	Nominated	
2005	Outstanding Performance by a Male Actor in a Television Movie or Miniseries	Redemption: The Stan Tookie Williams Story	Nominated	
2020	Outstanding Performance by a Male Actor in a Supporting Role in a Motion Picture	Just Mercy	Nominated	

== Critics awards ==
=== Boston Society of Film Critics ===
Year	Category	Nominated work	Result	Ref.
2004	Best Actor	Ray	Won	

=== Critics Choice Association ===
Year	Category	Nominated work	Result	Ref.
Critics' Choice Movie Awards
2004	Best Actor	Ray	Won	
2004	Best Supporting Actor	Collateral	Nominated	
Critics' Choice Super Awards
2020	Best Voice Actor in an Animated Movie	Soul	Won	

=== Dallas–Fort Worth Film Critics Association ===
Year	Category	Nominated work	Result	Ref.
2004	Best Supporting Actor	Collateral	Nominated	

=== Florida Film Critics Circle ===
Year	Category	Nominated work	Result	Ref.
2004	Best Actor	Ray	Won	

=== Kansas City Film Critics Circle ===
Year	Category	Nominated work	Result	Ref.
2004	Best Actor	Ray	Won	

=== Las Vegas Film Critics Society ===
Year	Category	Nominated work	Result	Ref.
2004	Best Actor	Ray	Won	

=== London Film Critics' Circle ===
Year	Category	Nominated work	Result	Ref.
2004	Actor of the Year	Ray	Won	

=== National Board of Review ===
Year	Category	Nominated work	Result	Ref.
2004	Best Actor	Ray	Won	

=== National Society of Film Critics ===
Year	Category	Nominated work	Result	Ref.
2004	Best Actor	Ray	Won	

=== New York Film Critics Circle ===
Year	Category	Nominated work	Result	Ref.
1999	Best Supporting Actor	Any Given Sunday	Runner-up	

=== Online Film Critics Society ===
Year	Category	Nominated work	Result	Ref.
2004	Best Actor	Ray	Nominated	
2004	Best Supporting Actor	Collateral	Nominated	

=== Southeastern Film Critics Association ===
Year	Category	Nominated work	Result	Ref.
2004	Best Actor	Ray	Won	

=== Vancouver Film Critics Circle ===
Year	Category	Nominated work	Result	Ref.
2004	Best Actor	Ray	Won	

=== Washington DC Area Film Critics Association ===
Year	Category	Nominated work	Result	Ref.
2004	Best Actor	Ray	Won	
2004	Best Supporting Actor	Collateral	Won	

== Miscellaneous awards ==
=== American Black Film Festival ===
Year	Category	Nominated work	Result	Ref.
2006	Outstanding Performance by an Actor in a Supporting Role	Jarhead	Nominated	

=== American Music Awards ===
Year	Category	Nominated work	Result	Ref.
2006	Favorite R&B/Soul Male Artist	—N/a	Won	
2006	Favorite R&B/Soul Album	Unpredictable	Nominated	
2009	Favorite R&B/Soul Male Artist	—N/a	Nominated	

=== The Astra Awards ===
Year	Category	Nominated work	Result	Ref.
2020	Best Animated or VFX Performance	Soul	Nominated	

=== BET Awards ===
Year	Category	Nominated work	Result	Ref.
2004	Best Actor	—N/a	Nominated	
2005	Best Actor	—N/a	Nominated	
2005	Best Male R&B Artist	—N/a	Nominated	
2005	Video of the Year	"Gold Digger" (with Kanye West)	Won (Note: Tied with Mary J. Blige for "Be Without You".)	
2005	Best Collaboration	"Gold Digger" (with Kanye West)	Won	
2005	Best Collaboration	"Unpredictable" (featuring Ludacris)	Nominated	
2008	Best Collaboration	"Blame It" (featuring T-Pain)	Won	
2008	Video of the Year	"Blame It" (featuring T-Pain)	Nominated	
2008	Best Male R&B Artist	—N/a	Nominated	

=== Black Reel Awards ===
Year	Category	Nominated work	Result	Ref.
2000	Best Supporting Actor	Any Given Sunday	Nominated	
2002	Best Supporting Actor	Ali	Won	
2005	Best Supporting Actor	Collateral	Won	
2005	Best Actor	Ray	Won	
2007	Best Actor	Dreamgirls	Nominated	
2013	Best Actor	Django Unchained	Nominated	

=== Blockbuster Entertainment Awards ===
Year	Category	Nominated work	Result	Ref.
1999	Favorite Supporting Actor	Any Given Sunday	Nominated	

=== Golden Raspberry Awards ===
Year	Category	Nominated work	Result	Ref.
2018	Worst Supporting Actor	Robin Hood	Nominated	

=== Hollywood Film Festival ===
Year	Category	Nominated work	Result	Ref.
2004	Hollywood Breakout Actor Award	—N/a	Won	

=== Independent Spirit Awards ===
Year	Category	Nominated work	Result	Ref.
2004	Best Male Lead	Redemption: The Stan Tookie Williams Story	Nominated	

=== MOBO Awards ===
Year	Category	Nominated work	Result	Ref.
2006	Best R&B Act	—N/a	Nominated	

=== MTV Movie & TV Awards ===
Year	Category	Nominated work	Result	Ref.
2000	Best Breakthrough Performance	Any Given Sunday	Nominated	
2005	Best Male Performance	Ray	Won	
2013	Best Male Performance	Django Unchained	Nominated	
2013	Best Jaw Dropping Moment	Django Unchained (with Samuel L. Jackson)	Won	

=== MTV Video Music Awards ===
Year	Category	Nominated work	Result	Ref.
2004	MTV2 Award	"Slow Jamz" (with Twista & Kanye West)	Nominated	
2006	Best R&B Video	"Unpredictable" (featuring Ludacris)	Nominated	
2006	Best Hip-Hop Video	"Gold Digger" (with Kanye West)	Nominated	
2006	Ringtone of the Year	"Gold Digger" (with Kanye West)	Nominated	

=== NAACP Image Awards ===
Year	Category	Nominated work	Result	Ref.
1997	Outstanding Actor in a Comedy Series	The Jamie Foxx Show	Won	
1998	Outstanding Actor in a Comedy Series	The Jamie Foxx Show	Nominated	
1999	Outstanding Actor in a Comedy Series	The Jamie Foxx Show	Nominated	
2000	Outstanding Actor in a Comedy Series	The Jamie Foxx Show	Nominated	
2004	Outstanding Actor in a Motion Picture	Ray	Won	
2004	Outstanding Supporting Actor in a Motion Picture	Collateral	Nominated	
2005	Outstanding Male Artist	—N/a	Won	
2008	Outstanding Male Artist	—N/a	Won	

=== Nickelodeon Kids' Choice Awards ===
Year	Category	Nominated work	Result	Ref.
2015	Favorite Movie Actor	The Amazing Spider-Man 2	Nominated	
2015	Favorite Villain	The Amazing Spider-Man 2	Nominated	
2021	Favorite Voice from an Animated Movie	Soul	Nominated	

=== People's Choice Awards ===
Year	Category	Nominated work	Result	Ref.
2005	Favorite Leading Man	—N/a	Nominated	
2007	Favorite Leading Man	—N/a	Nominated	

=== Satellite Awards ===
Year	Category	Nominated work	Result	Ref.
2004	Best Actor in a Motion Picture – Musical or Comedy	Ray	Won	
2004	Best Actor in a Supporting Role – Drama	Collateral	Nominated	
2004	Best Actor in a Miniseries or Motion Picture Made for Television	Redemption: The Stan Tookie Williams Story	Won	

=== Soul Train Music Awards ===
Year	Category	Nominated work	Result	Ref.
2006	Best Music Video	"Gold Digger" (with Kanye West)	Won	
2006	Best R&B/Soul Dance Cut	"Gold Digger" (with Kanye West)	Nominated	
2007	Best R&B/Soul Album – Male	Unpredictable	Won	
2009	Album of the Year	Intuition	Nominated	
2009	Record of the Year	"Blame It"	Won	

=== Teen Choice Awards ===
Year	Category	Nominated work	Result	Ref.
2005	Choice Movie Actor: Drama	Ray	Nominated	
2014	Choice Movie: Villain	The Amazing Spider-Man 2	Nominated	

=== TV Land Awards ===
Year	Category	Nominated work	Result	Ref.
2006	Little Screen/Big Screen Star	—N/a	Nominated	
2007	Little Screen/Big Screen Star	—N/a	Nominated	

=== Vibe Awards ===
Year	Category	Nominated work	Result	Ref.
2004	Best Collabo	"Slow Jamz" (with Twista & Kanye West)	Nominated	
2005	Best Collabo	"Gold Digger" (with Kanye West)	Nominated	

=== Women in Film Honors ===
Year	Category	Nominated work	Result	Ref.
2005	Crystal Award	—N/a	Won	
