= San Francisco Film Critics Circle Award for Best Screenplay =

Former US film award (2004–2005)

The San Francisco Film Critics Circle Award for Best Screenplay is given by the San Francisco Film Critics Circle (only in 2004 and 2005).

== Winners ==
=== 2000s ===
Year	Winner	Writer(s)	Source	Ref.
2004	Sideways	Alexander Payne and Jim Taylor	novel by Rex Pickett	
2005	Good Night, and Good Luck.	George Clooney and Grant Heslov		
