= San Francisco Bay Area Film Critics Circle =

Organization of film critics based in San Francisco, California

The San Francisco Bay Area Film Critics Circle (SFBAFCC), formerly known as San Francisco Film Critics Circle, was founded in 2002 as an organization of film journalists and critics from San Francisco, California based publications.

Included in its membership are journalists from San Francisco Chronicle, San Jose Mercury News, Oakland Tribune, Contra Costa Times, San Francisco Bay Guardian, SF Weekly, East Bay Express, San Jose Metro, Palo Alto Weekly, NorthBay biz, The San Francisco Examiner, KRON-TV, Variety, Bleeding Cool, CultureVulture.net, Splicedwire.com, and CombustibleCelluloid.com.

== SFBAFCC Awards ==
In December of each year, the SFFCC meets to vote on the San Francisco Bay Area Film Critics Circle awards for the films released in the same calendar year.

Categories of awards include:

Best Actor
Best Actress
Best Cinematography
Best Director
Best Documentary Film
Best Film
Best Foreign Language Film
Best Animated Feature
Best Supporting Actor
Best Supporting Actress
Best Adapted Screenplay (2006–present)
Best Original Screenplay (2006–present)
Best Screenplay (2004–2005)

=== Marlon Riggs award ===
The Marlon Riggs award is a category named after Black gay filmmaker, educator, poet, and activist Marlon Riggs and is awarded to "Bay Area filmmaker(s) or individual(s) who represents courage and innovation in the world of cinema." Established in, the first winner was filmmaker Sam Green for his Academy Award nominated film, The Weather Underground. The winners are:

- 2024 - San Quentin Film Festival (Rahsaan "New York" Thomas and Cori Thomas)
- 2023 - H.P. Mendoza
- 2022 - Phil Tippett
- 2021 - Rita Moreno
- 2020 - Dawn Porter
- 2019 - Jimmie Fails and Joe Talbot
- 2018 - Boots Riley
- 2017 - Peter Bratt
- 2016 - Joshua Grannell (a.k.a. Peaches Christ)
- 2015 - Lee Tung Foo (a.k.a. Frank Lee)
- 2014 - Joel Shepard
- 2013 - Ryan Coogler
- 2012 - Peter Nicks
- 2011 - National Film Preservation Foundation
- 2010 - Elliot Lavine
- 2009 - tie: Frazer Bradshaw / Barry Jenkins
- 2008 - Rob Nilsson
- 2007 - Lynn Hershman Leeson
- 2006 - Stephen Salmons, co-founder and artistic director of the San Francisco Silent Film Festival
- 2005 - Jenni Olson
- 2004 - Anita Monga, former programmer for the Castro Theatre
- 2003 - Sam Green

=== Multiple award winners ===
- 6 awards:
  - Sideways (2004): Best Picture, Director, Actor, Adapted Screenplay, Supporting Actor, and Supporting Actress
  - Moonlight (2016): Best Picture, Director, Original Screenplay, Supporting Actor, Cinematography, and Editing
- 4 awards:
  - Milk (2008): Best Picture, Director, Actor, and Original Screenplay
  - Boyhood (2014): Best Picture, Director, Supporting Actress, and Editing
- 3 awards:
  - Brokeback Mountain (2005): Best Picture, Director, and Actor
  - Little Children (2006): Best Picture, Adapted Screenplay, and Supporting Actor
  - The Social Network (2010): Best Picture, Director, and Adapted Screenplay
  - The Tree of Life (2011): Best Picture, Director, and Cinematography
  - Birdman (2014): Best Actor, Original Screenplay, and Supporting Actor
  - Mad Max: Fury Road (2015): Best Director, Editing, and Cinematography
  - Parasite (2019): Best Director, Original Screenplay, and Foreign Language Film
- 2 awards:
  - Lost in Translation (2003): Best Picture and Actor
  - The Assassination of Jesse James by the Coward Robert Ford (2007): Best Picture and Supporting Actor
  - Away from Her (2007): Best Actress and Adapted Screenplay
  - The Wrestler (2008): Best Actor and Supporting Actress
  - The Dark Knight (2008): Best Supporting Actor and Cinematography
  - The Hurt Locker (2009): Best Picture and Director
  - The King's Speech (2010): Best Actor and Original Screenplay
  - Tinker Tailor Soldier Spy (2011): Best Actor and Adapted Screenplay
  - Lincoln (2012): Best Adapted Screenplay and Supporting Actor
  - Brooklyn (2015): Best Actress and Adapted Screenplay
  - Love & Mercy (2015): Best Actor and Original Screenplay
  - Arrival (2016): Best Adapted Screenplay and Editing
  - Fences (2016): Best Actor and Supporting Actress
  - The Handmaiden (2016): Best Foreign Language Film and Production Design
  - The Florida Project (2017): Best Picture and Supporting Actor
  - The Shape of Water (2017): Best Director and Production Design

== Award ceremonies ==
- 2002: 1st San Francisco Film Critics Circle Awards
- 2003: 2nd San Francisco Film Critics Circle Awards
- 2004: 3rd San Francisco Film Critics Circle Awards
- 2005: 4th San Francisco Film Critics Circle Awards
- 2006: 5th San Francisco Film Critics Circle Awards
- 2007: 6th San Francisco Film Critics Circle Awards
- 2008: 7th San Francisco Film Critics Circle Awards
- 2009: 8th San Francisco Film Critics Circle Awards
- 2010: 9th San Francisco Film Critics Circle Awards
- 2011: 10th San Francisco Film Critics Circle Awards
- 2012: 11th San Francisco Film Critics Circle Awards
- 2013: 12th San Francisco Film Critics Circle Awards
- 2014: 13th San Francisco Film Critics Circle Awards
- 2015: 14th San Francisco Film Critics Circle Awards
- 2016: 15th San Francisco Film Critics Circle Awards
- 2017: 16th San Francisco Film Critics Circle Awards
- 2018: 17th San Francisco Bay Area Film Critics Circle Awards
- 2019: 18th San Francisco Bay Area Film Critics Circle Awards
- 2020: 19th San Francisco Bay Area Film Critics Circle Awards
- 2021: 20th San Francisco Bay Area Film Critics Circle Awards
- 2022: 21st San Francisco Bay Area Film Critics Circle Awards
- 2023: 22nd San Francisco Bay Area Film Critics Circle Awards
- 2024: 23rd San Francisco Bay Area Film Critics Circle Awards
- 2025: 24th San Francisco Bay Area Film Critics Circle Awards
