= Chicago Film Critics Association Award for Best Screenplay =

Award given by the Chicago Film Critics Association

The Chicago Film Critics Association Award for Best Screenplay was an annual award given by the Chicago Film Critics Association.

== Winners ==
=== 1990s ===
- 1990: Goodfellas – Nicholas Pileggi and Martin Scorsese
- 1993: Schindler's List – Steven Zaillian
- 1994: Pulp Fiction – Roger Avary and Quentin Tarantino
- 1995: The Usual Suspects – Christopher McQuarrie
- 1996: Fargo – Joel Coen and Ethan Coen
- 1997: L.A. Confidential – Curtis Hanson and Brian Helgeland
- 1998: Shakespeare in Love – Marc Norman and Tom Stoppard
  - Bulworth – Warren Beatty and Jeremy Pikser
  - Happiness – Todd Solondz
  - A Simple Plan – Scott Smith
  - The Truman Show – Andrew Niccol
- 1999: Being John Malkovich – Charlie Kaufman
  - American Beauty – Alan Ball
  - Magnolia – Paul Thomas Anderson
  - The Sixth Sense – M. Night Shyamalan
  - Topsy-Turvy – Mike Leigh

=== 2000s ===
- 2000: Almost Famous – Cameron Crowe
  - State and Main – David Mamet
  - Traffic – Stephen Gaghan
  - Wonder Boys – Steve Kloves
  - You Can Count on Me – Kenneth Lonergan
- 2001: Memento – Christopher Nolan
  - A Beautiful Mind – Akiva Goldsman
  - Ghost World – Daniel Clowes and Terry Zwigoff
  - Gosford Park – Julian Fellowes
  - The Royal Tenenbaums – Wes Anderson and Owen Wilson
- 2002: Adaptation. – Charlie and Donald Kaufman
  - About a Boy – Peter Hedges, Chris Weitz, and Paul Weitz
  - About Schmidt – Alexander Payne and Jim Taylor
  - Far from Heaven – Todd Haynes
  - Punch-Drunk Love – Paul Thomas Anderson
- 2003: Lost in Translation – Sofia Coppola
- 2004: Sideways – Alexander Payne and Jim Taylor
- 2005: Crash – Paul Haggis and Bobby Moresco
  - Brokeback Mountain – Larry McMurtry and Diana Ossana
  - Capote – Dan Futterman
  - Good Night, and Good Luck. – George Clooney and Grant Heslov
  - A History of Violence – Josh Olson
