= 2004 National Society of Film Critics Awards =

Annual US film awards ceremony

39th NSFC Awards

January 9, 2005

Best Film:
Million Dollar Baby

The 39th National Society of Film Critics Awards, given on 9 January 2005, honored the best in film for 2004.

== Winners ==
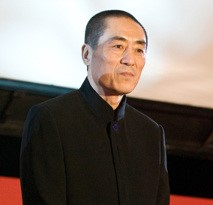
Zhang Yimou, Best Director winner

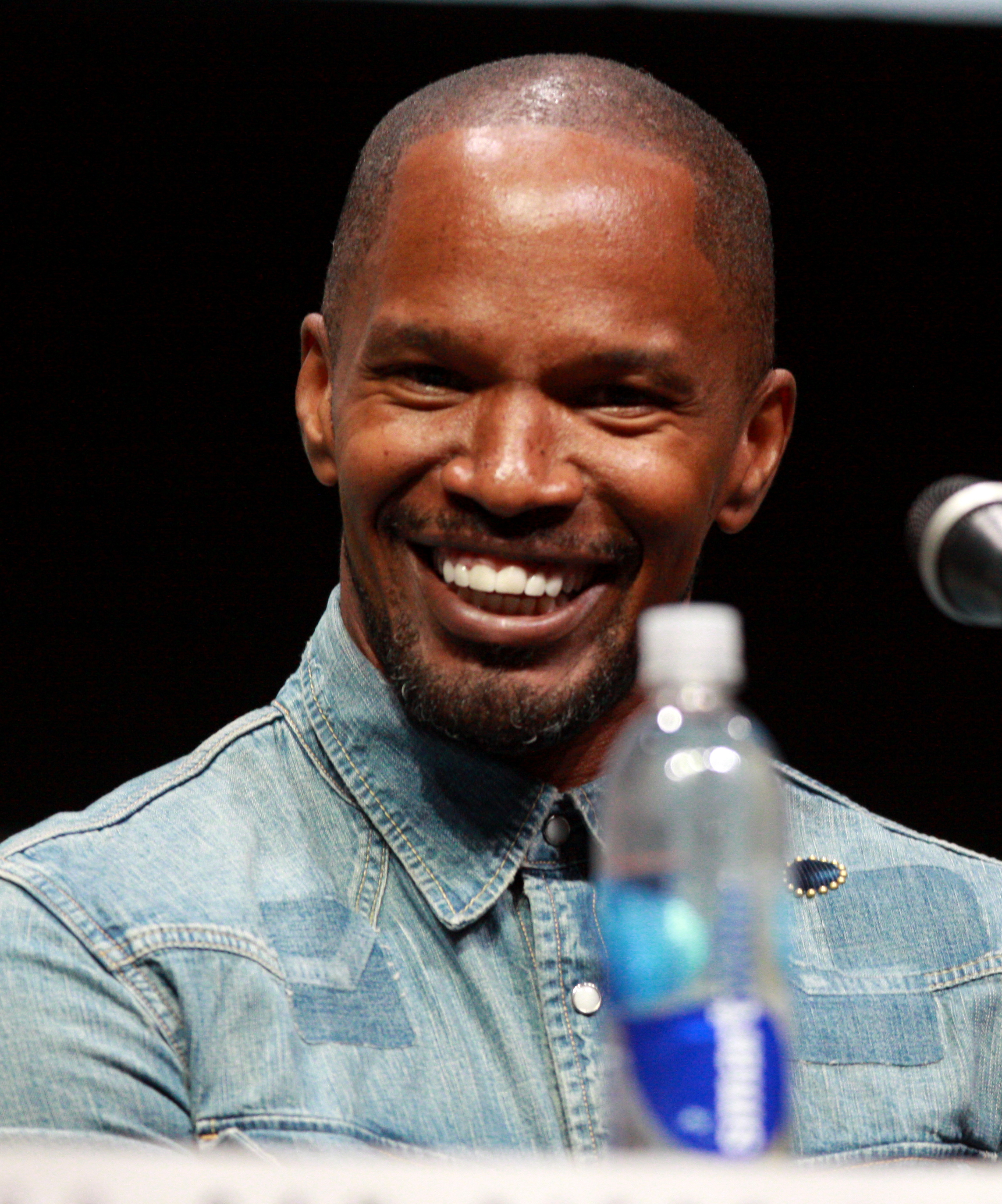
Jamie Foxx, Best Actor winner

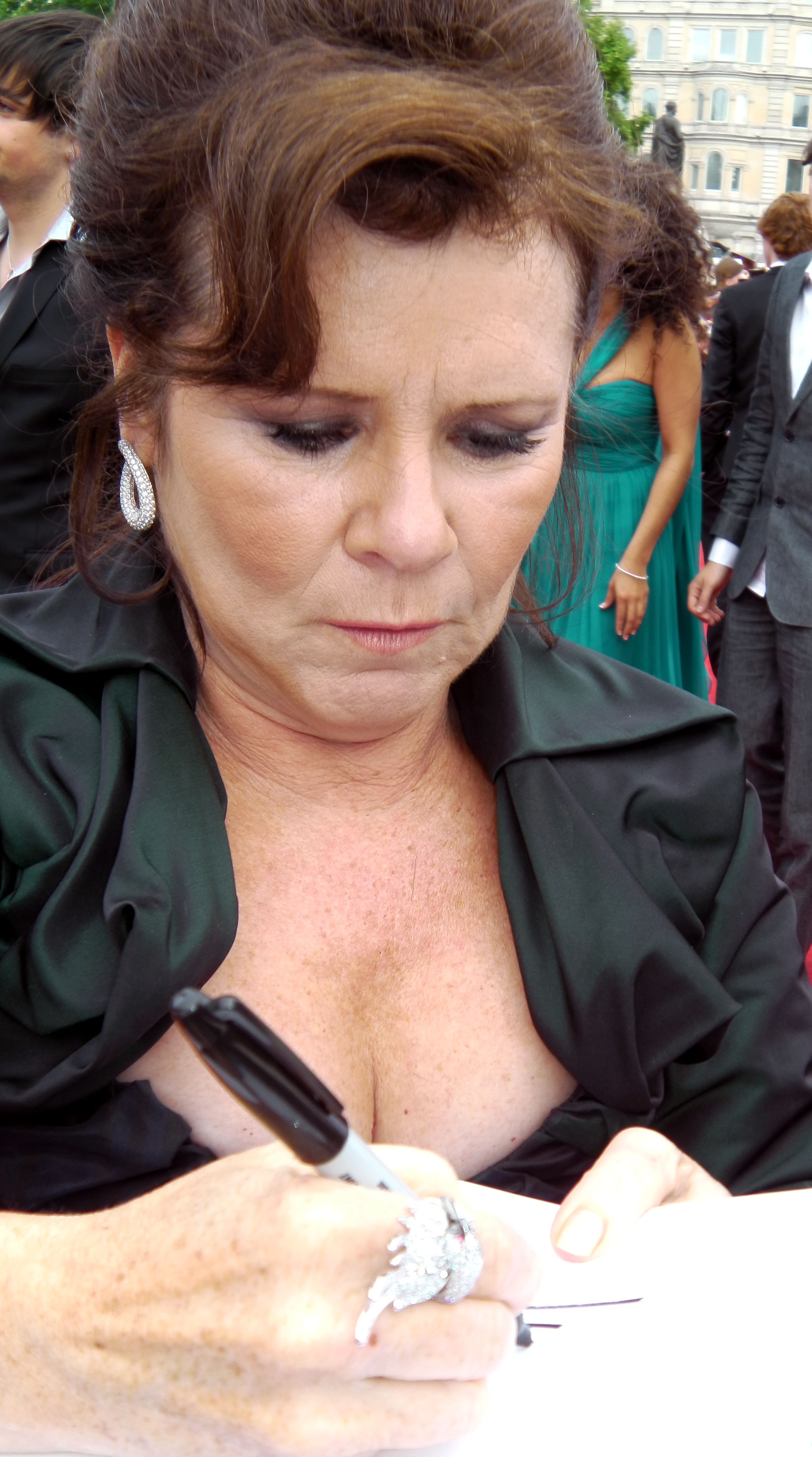
Imelda Staunton, Best Actress co-winner

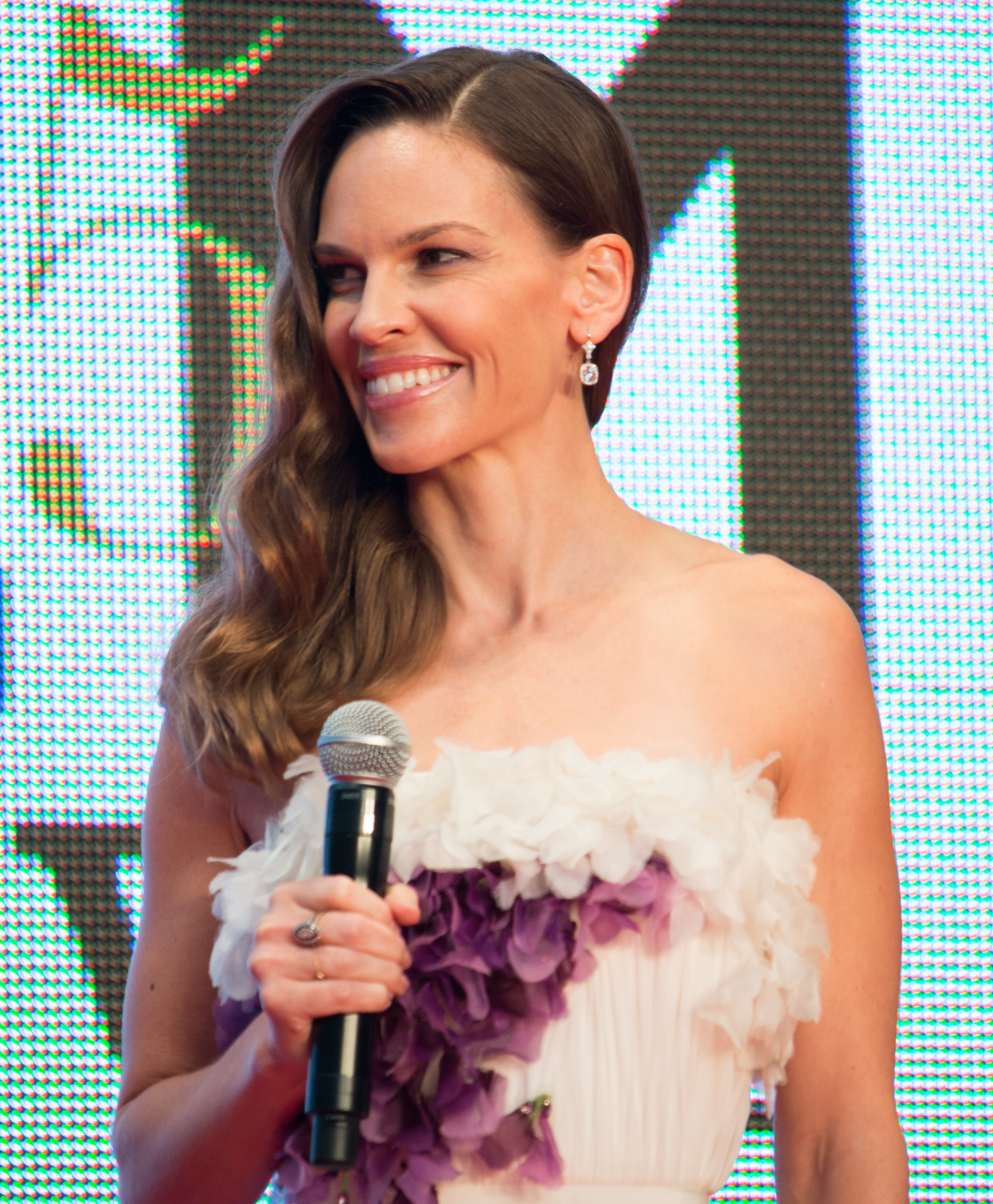
Hilary Swank, Best Actress co-winner

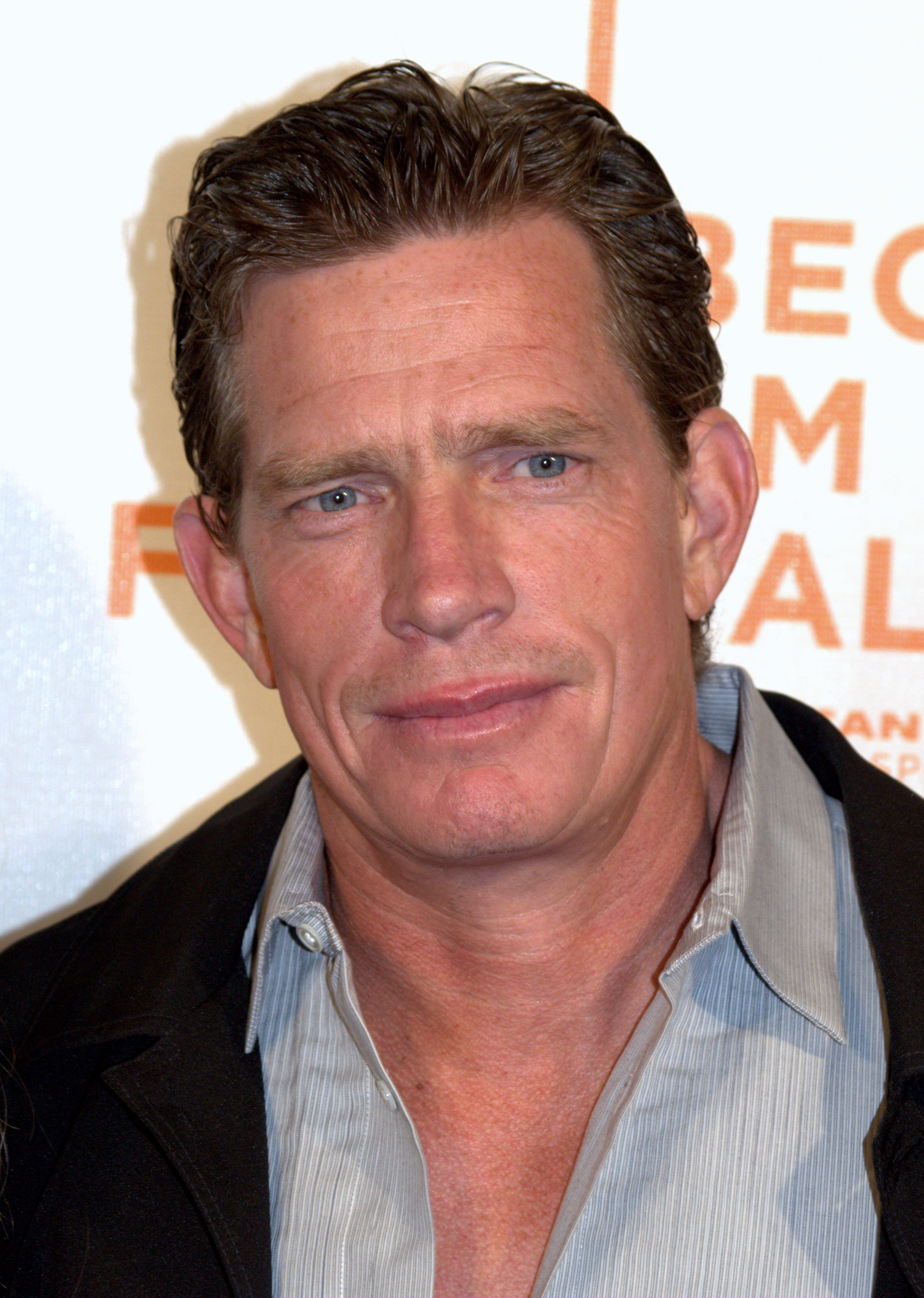
Thomas Haden Church, Best Supporting Actor winner

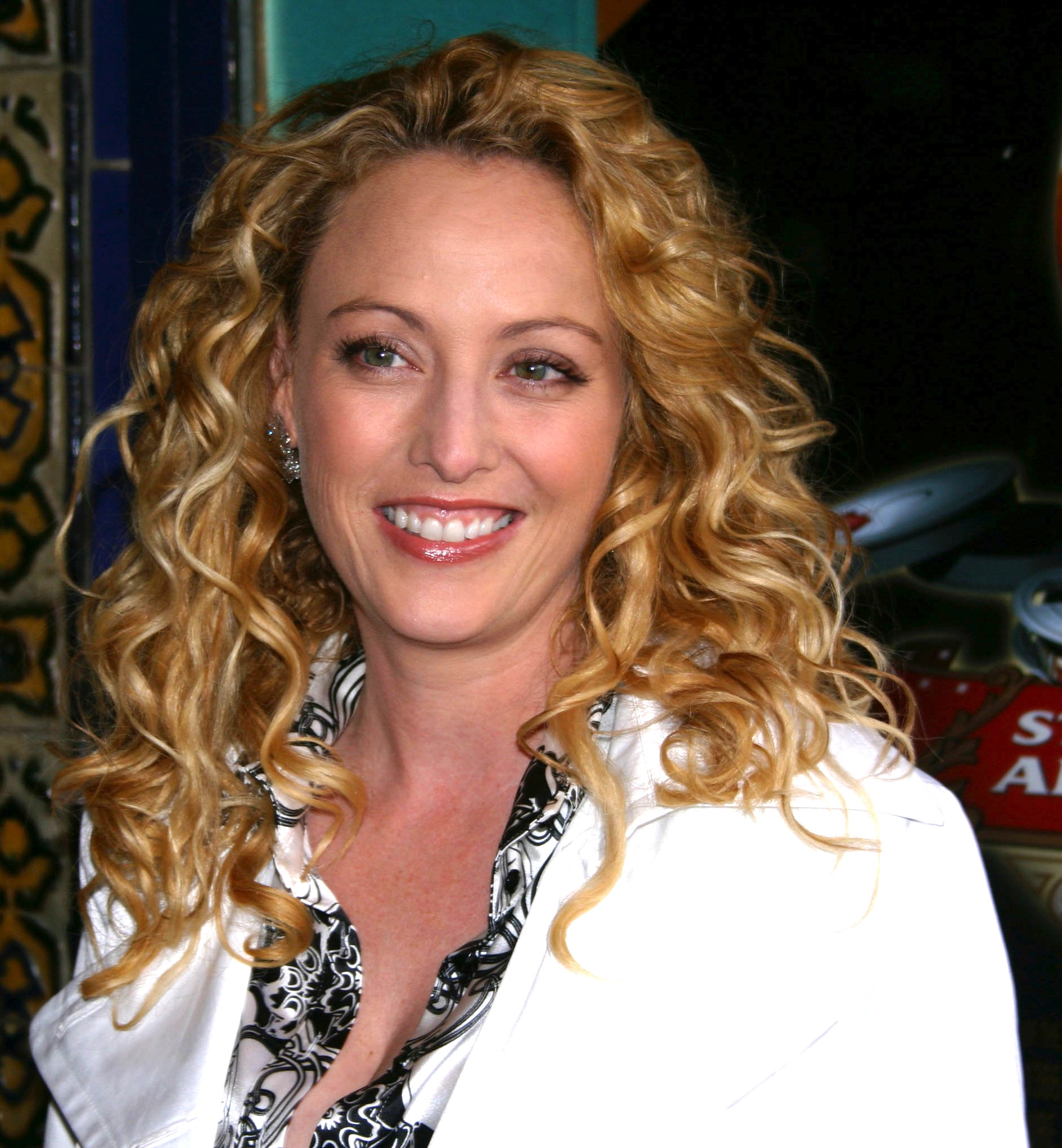
Virginia Madsen, Best Supporting Actress winner

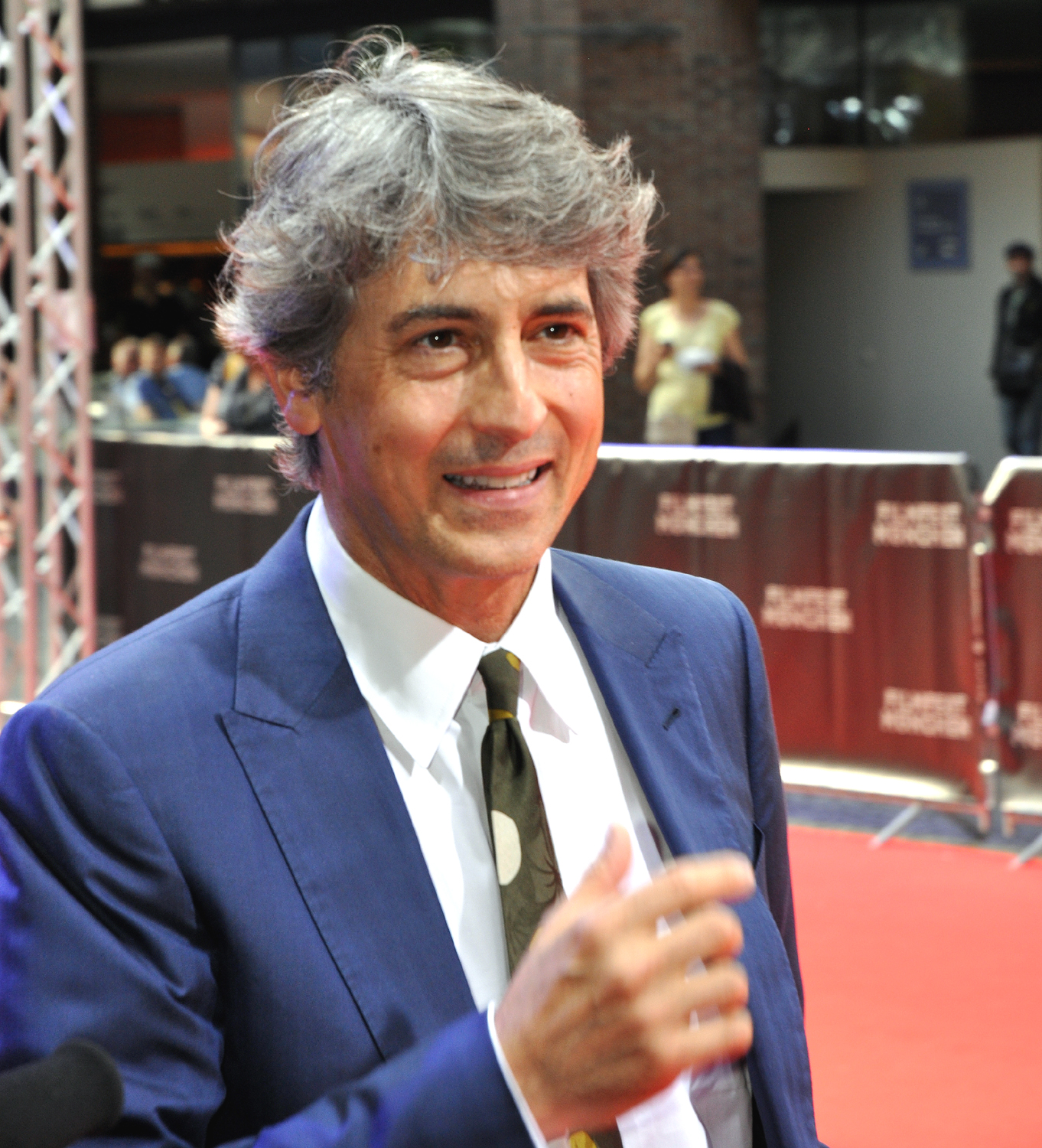
Alexander Payne, Best Screenplay co-winner

=== Best Picture ===
1. Million Dollar Baby (50)
2. Sideways (44)
3. Before Sunset (28)

=== Best Director ===
1. Zhang Yimou – House of Flying Daggers (Shi mian mai fu) and Hero (Ying xiong) (33)
2. Alexander Payne – Sideways (31)
3. Clint Eastwood – Million Dollar Baby (30)

=== Best Actor ===
1. Jamie Foxx – Ray and Collateral (31)
2. Paul Giamatti – Sideways (29)
3. Clint Eastwood – Million Dollar Baby (26)

=== Best Actress ===
1. Imelda Staunton – Vera Drake (TIE) (52)
1. Hilary Swank – Million Dollar Baby (TIE) (52)
3. Julie Delpy – Before Sunset (40)

=== Best Supporting Actor ===
1. Thomas Haden Church – Sideways (55)
2. Morgan Freeman – Million Dollar Baby (54)
3. Peter Sarsgaard – Kinsey (19)

=== Best Supporting Actress ===
1. Virginia Madsen – Sideways (58)
2. Cate Blanchett – The Aviator and Coffee and Cigarettes (37)
3. Laura Linney – Kinsey (18)

=== Best Screenplay ===
1. Alexander Payne and Jim Taylor – Sideways (60)
2. Charlie Kaufman – Eternal Sunshine of the Spotless Mind (55)
3. Richard Linklater, Julie Delpy and Ethan Hawke – Before Sunset (29)

=== Best Cinematography ===
1. Zhao Xiaoding – House of Flying Daggers (Shi mian mai fu) (39)
2. Christopher Doyle – Hero (Ying xiong) (31)
3. Dion Beebe and Paul Cameron – Collateral (18)

=== Best Foreign Language Film ===
1. Moolaadé (29)
2. House of Flying Daggers (Shi mian mai fu) (27)
3. Notre musique (15)

=== Best Non-Fiction Film ===
1. Tarnation (27)
2. The Story of the Weeping Camel (Die Geschichte vom weinenden Kamel) (25)
3. Bright Leaves (16)

=== Special Citation ===
- Richard Schickel, Brian Jamieson, and Warner Home Video for their reconstruction of Samuel Fuller's The Big Red One
- Turner Classic Movies for the breadth and intelligence of its film programming and its commitment to film history

=== Film Heritage Awards (to new DVDs) ===
1. The Leopard (The Criterion Collection) – for assembling a stunning edition for the home video debut of Visconti's masterpiece.
2. John Cassavetes – Five Films (Criterion) – for bringing together a core collection of work from America's most influential independent filmmaker
3. Fritz Lang Epic Collection (Kino) and M (Criterion) – for the ongoing, revelatory work of the German Film Archives and making it available to Kino and Criterion for excellent editions.
4. "More Treasures from American Film Archives" (National Film Preservation Foundation) – for drawing much deserved attention to the excellent work of America's national and regional film archives.
