= Drunk dialing =

Intoxicated person making a phone call

Drunk dialing refers to an intoxicated person making phone calls that they would not likely make if sober, often a lonely individual calling former or current love interests.

Drunk texting, emailing, and editing internet sites are related phenomena, and potentially yet more embarrassing for the sender as, when the message is sent, it cannot be rescinded; the message may be misspelled (due to being drunk), and it might be reviewed and shared among many.

== Hurtful communication ==
Table from the 2010 DrugScience study ranking various drugs (legal and illegal) based on statements by drug-harm experts. This study rated alcohol the most harmful drug overall, and the only drug more harmful to others than to the users themselves.

A 2021 study, that examined the relationship between drunk texting and emotional dysregulation, found a positive correlation. The findings suggest that interventions targeting emotional regulation skills may be beneficial.

== In popular culture ==
In Kurt Vonnegut's 1969 novel Slaughterhouse-Five, the main character describes his tendency to drunk dial:

I have this disease late at night sometimes, involving alcohol and the telephone. I get drunk, and I drive my wife away with breath like mustard gas and roses. And then, speaking gravely and elegantly into the telephone, I ask the telephone operators to connect me with this friend or that one, from whom I have not heard in years.

— Kurt Vonnegut

In the 2004 film Sideways, Miles Raymond (Paul Giamatti) gets drunk and calls his ex-wife while at a restaurant. When he returns to the table, his friend Jack (Thomas Haden Church) asks him, "Did you drink and dial?"

== In media ==
The New York Post, The New York Times, and The Washington Post, have all reported on drunk dialing. Cell phone manufacturers and carriers are helping callers prevent drunk dialing. Virgin Mobile has launched an option to help its users stop drunk dialing by initiating multi-hour bans on calling specific numbers and the LG Group introduced the LP4100 mobile phone, which includes a breathalyzer. Although the breathalyzer function was incorporated to help the user assess fitness to drive, rather than fitness to phone, the owner can program the LP4100 to restrict calls to specific telephone numbers on certain days or after a certain hour, a feature that might help limit drunk dialing by eliminating calls when the user is more likely to be intoxicated. This requires prior planning or awareness that one will become intoxicated at a later time. Some reports indicate that this phone, or a planned future version for U.S. release, would activate the call-blocking function in tandem with the blood alcohol content results from the breathalyzer. A mobile app Drunk Mode was launched in April 2013. Drunk Mode prevents users from calling or sending messages to specific contacts for up to 12 hours. A reported feature also sets notifications every 30, 60, 90 or 120 minutes to remind users not to engage in certain "drunk behaviors".
