= The Hitching Post =

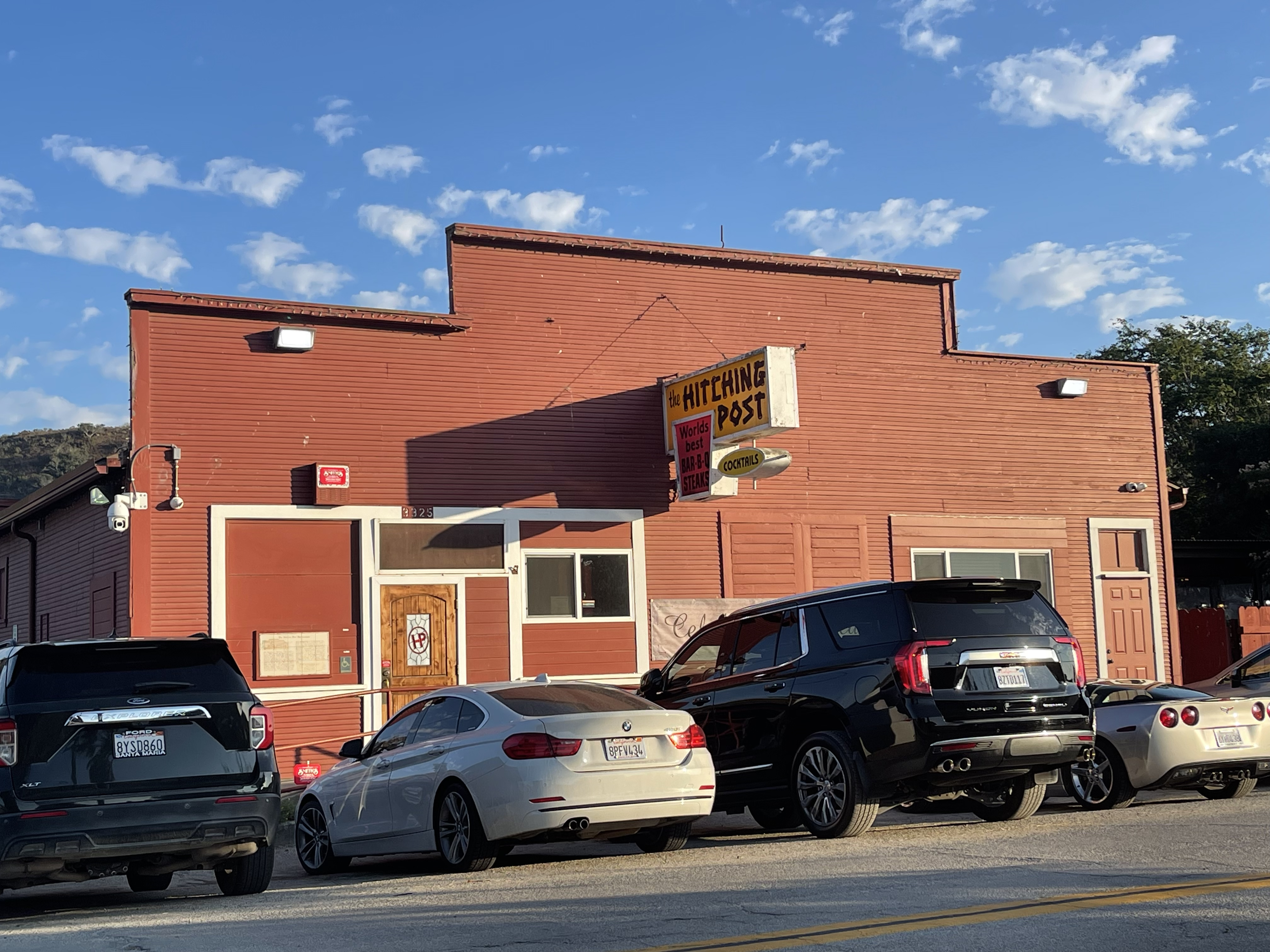
- The Hitching Post in Casmalia, California in 2023.
- Interactive map of The Hitching Post

Restaurant information
- Established: 1952; 74 years ago
- Owner: The Ostini Family
- Food type: Steakhouse, Barbecue, American
- Location: California, United States
- Website: hitchingpost1.com hitchingpost2.com

The Hitching Post and The Hitching Post II are upscale American steakhouse restaurants located in Santa Barbara County, California, in California's Central Coast region. They are best known for their Santa Maria-style barbecue restaurants popular in the area.

== History ==
The original Hitching Post was purchased in 1952 by the Ostini family in Casmalia, California, in a building that was previously the Casmalia Hotel before it was converted into a restaurant in the 1940s. Its sister restaurant The Hitching Post II was opened in 1986 in Buellton, California.

The restaurant also makes its own brand of wines under the Hartley Ostini brand.

== In popular culture ==
The Hitching Post II is known for being featured in the Rex Pickett novel Sideways and the Academy Award winning 2004 Alexander Payne film adaptation of the same name.

== Gallery ==
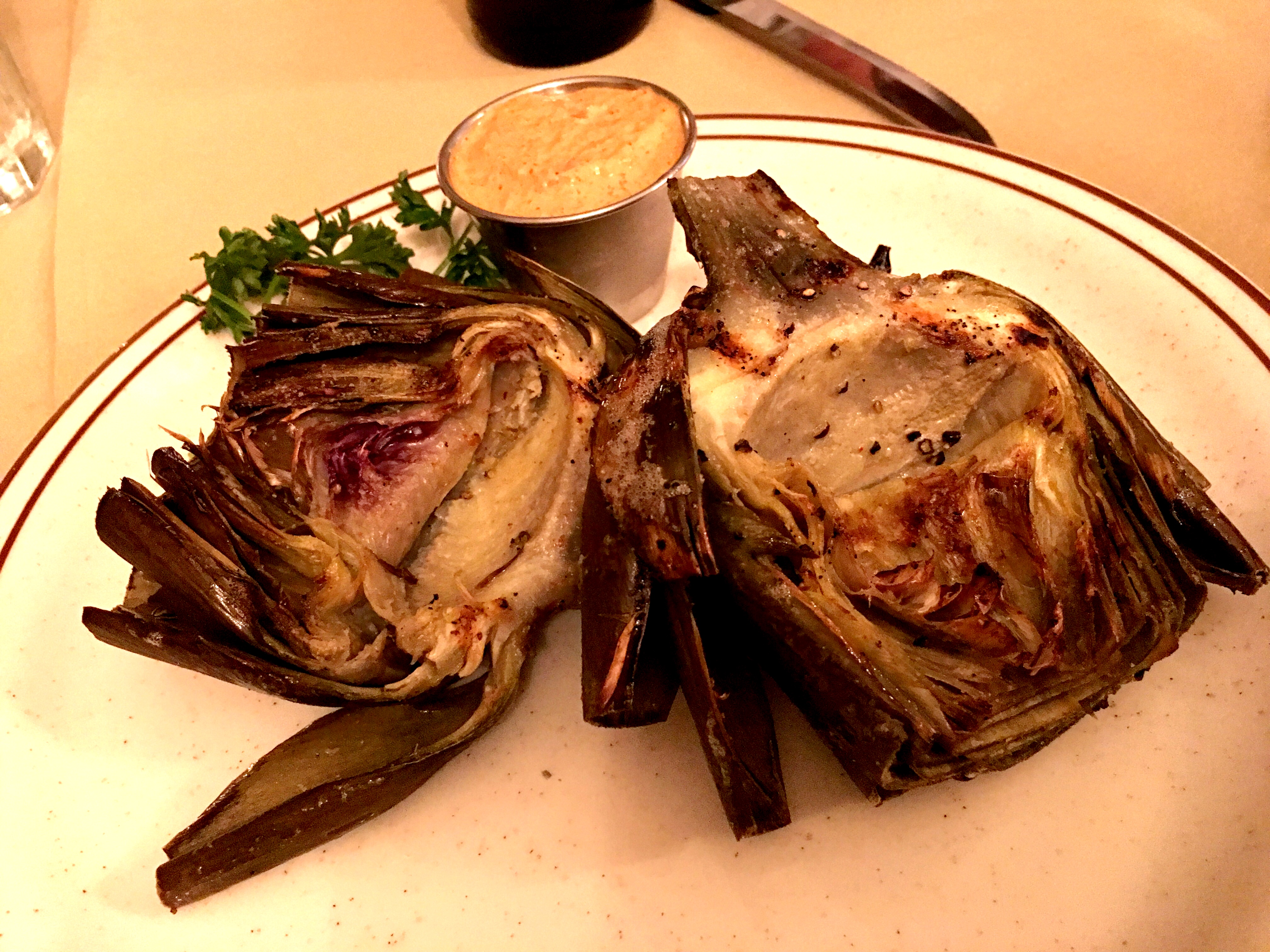
Grilled artichokes

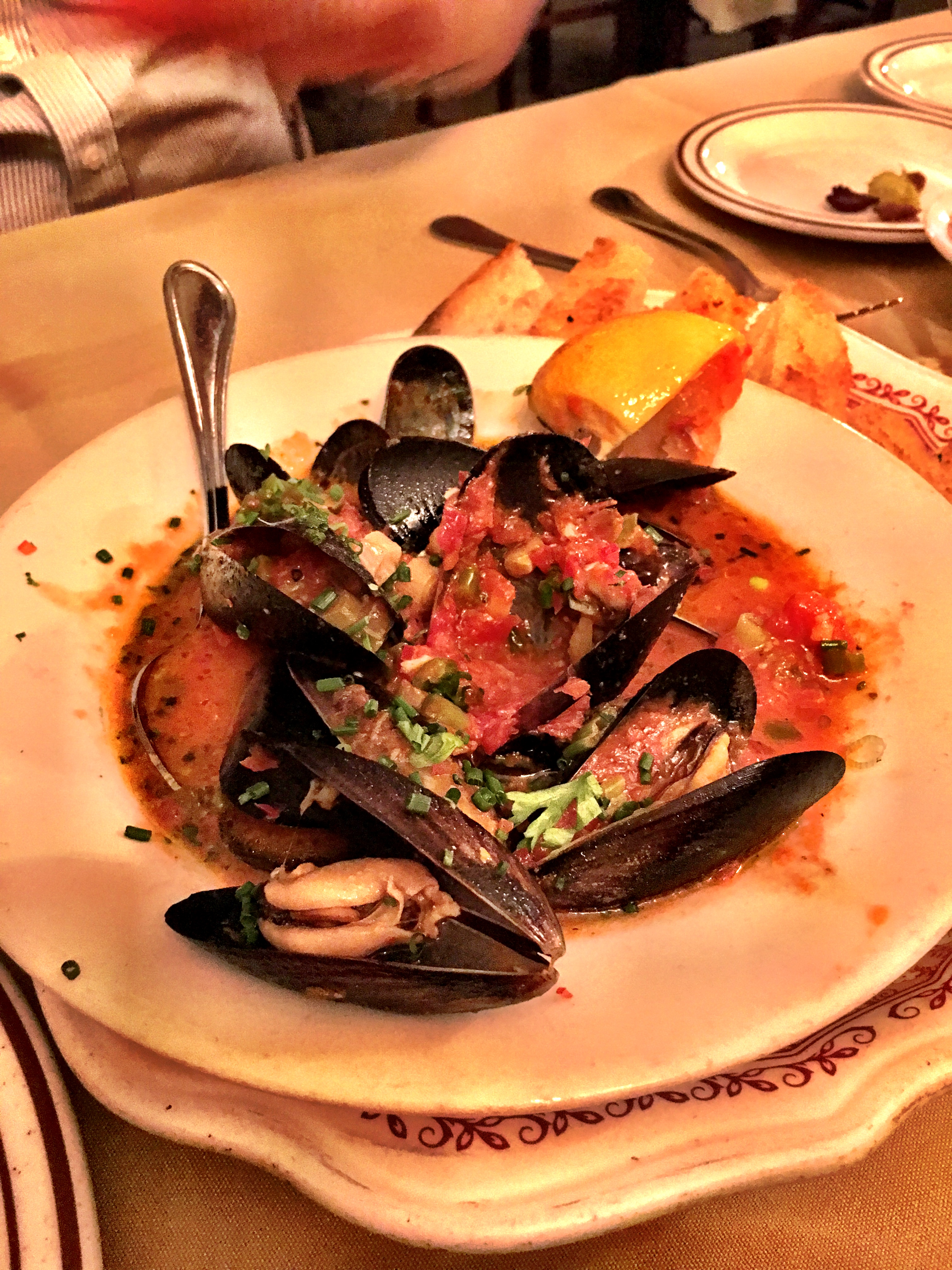
Mussels
