= 2004 New York Film Critics Circle Awards =

70th New York Film Critics Circle Awards

70th New York Film Critics Circle Awards
- Date: January 9, 2005

Highlights
- Best Film: Sideways, The Incredibles (animated)
- Best Direction: Clint Eastwood; Million Dollar Baby
- Best Actor: Paul Giamatti; Sideways
- Best Actress: Imelda Staunton; Vera Drake

The 70th New York Film Critics Circle Awards, honoring the best in film for 2004, were announced on 13 December 2004 and presented on 9 January 2005.

== Winners ==
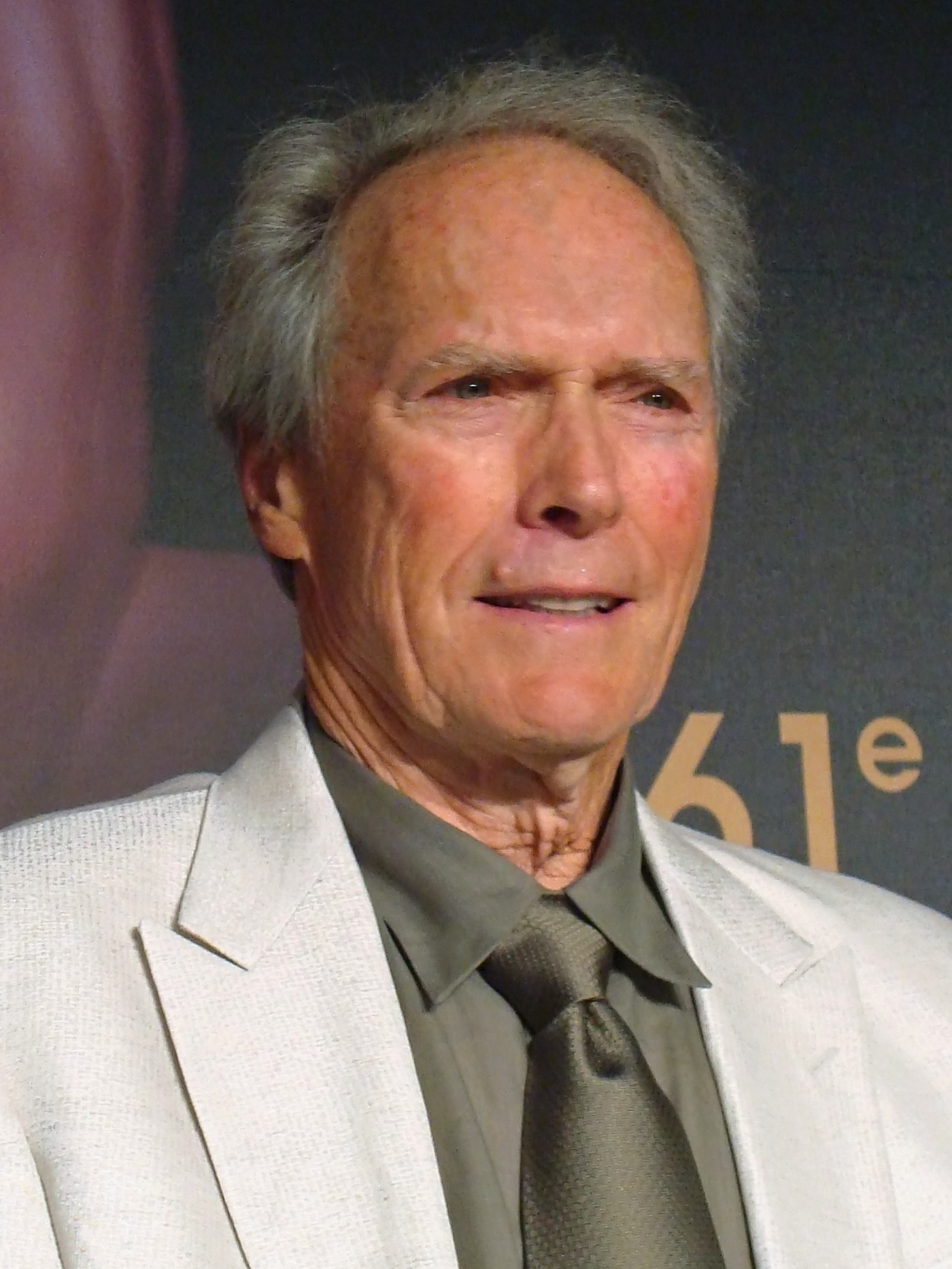
Clint Eastwood, Best Director winner

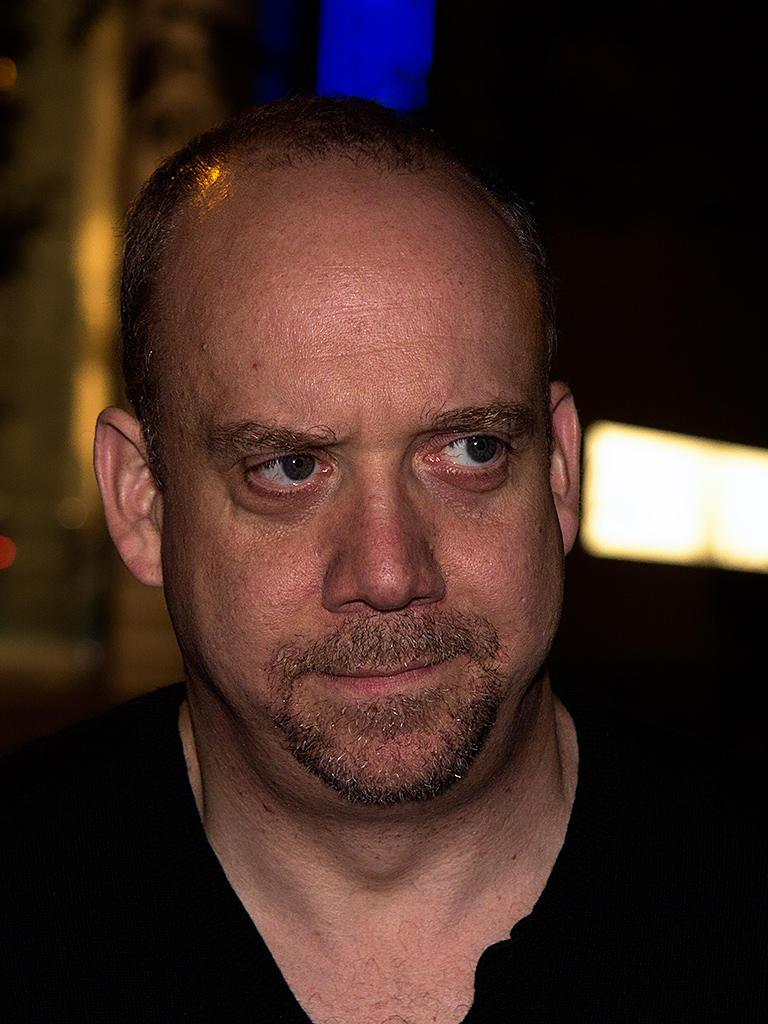
Paul Giamatti, Best Actor winner

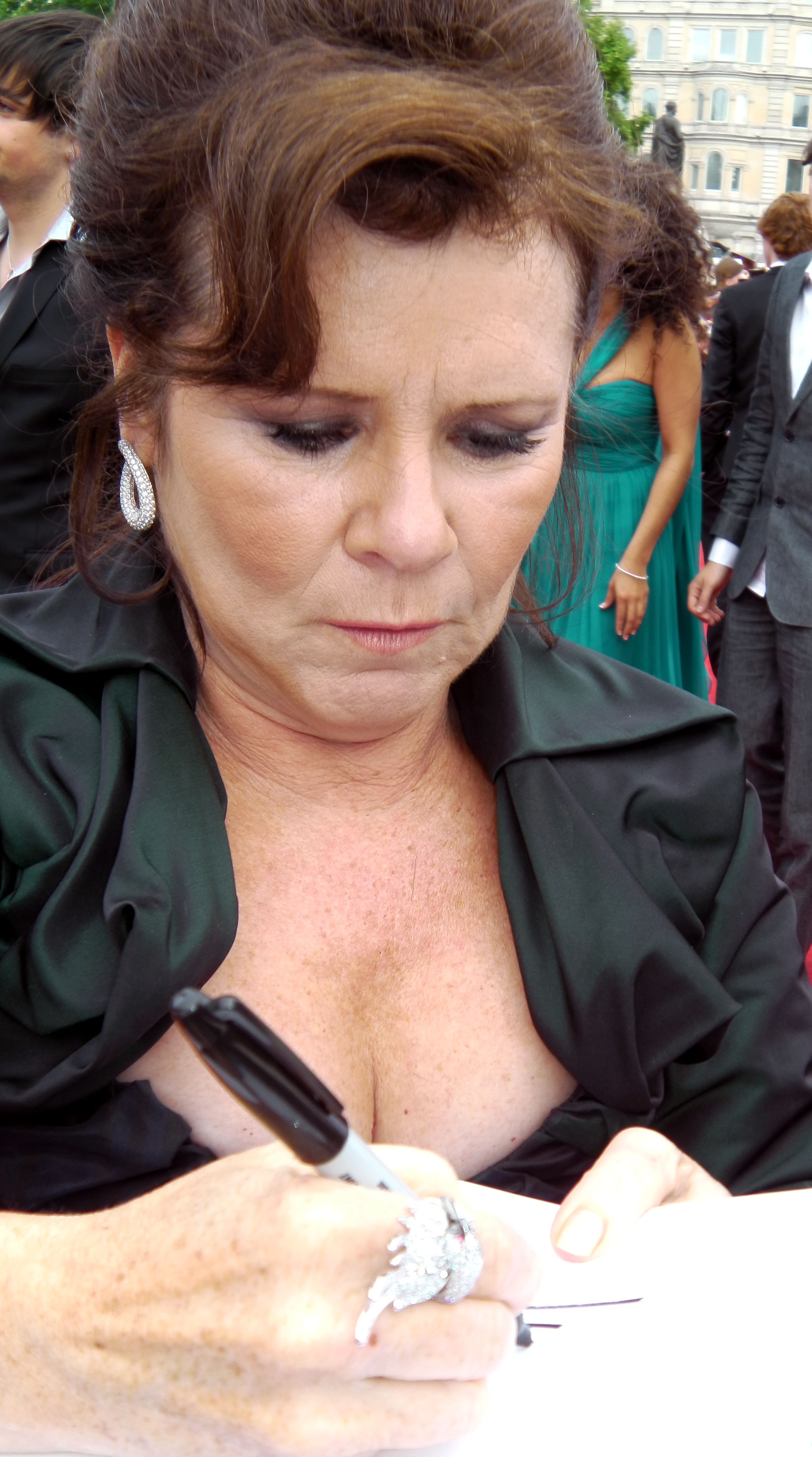
Imelda Staunton, Best Actress winner

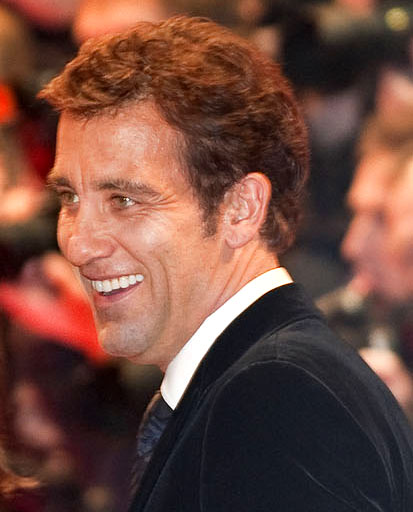
Clive Owen, Best Supporting Actor winner

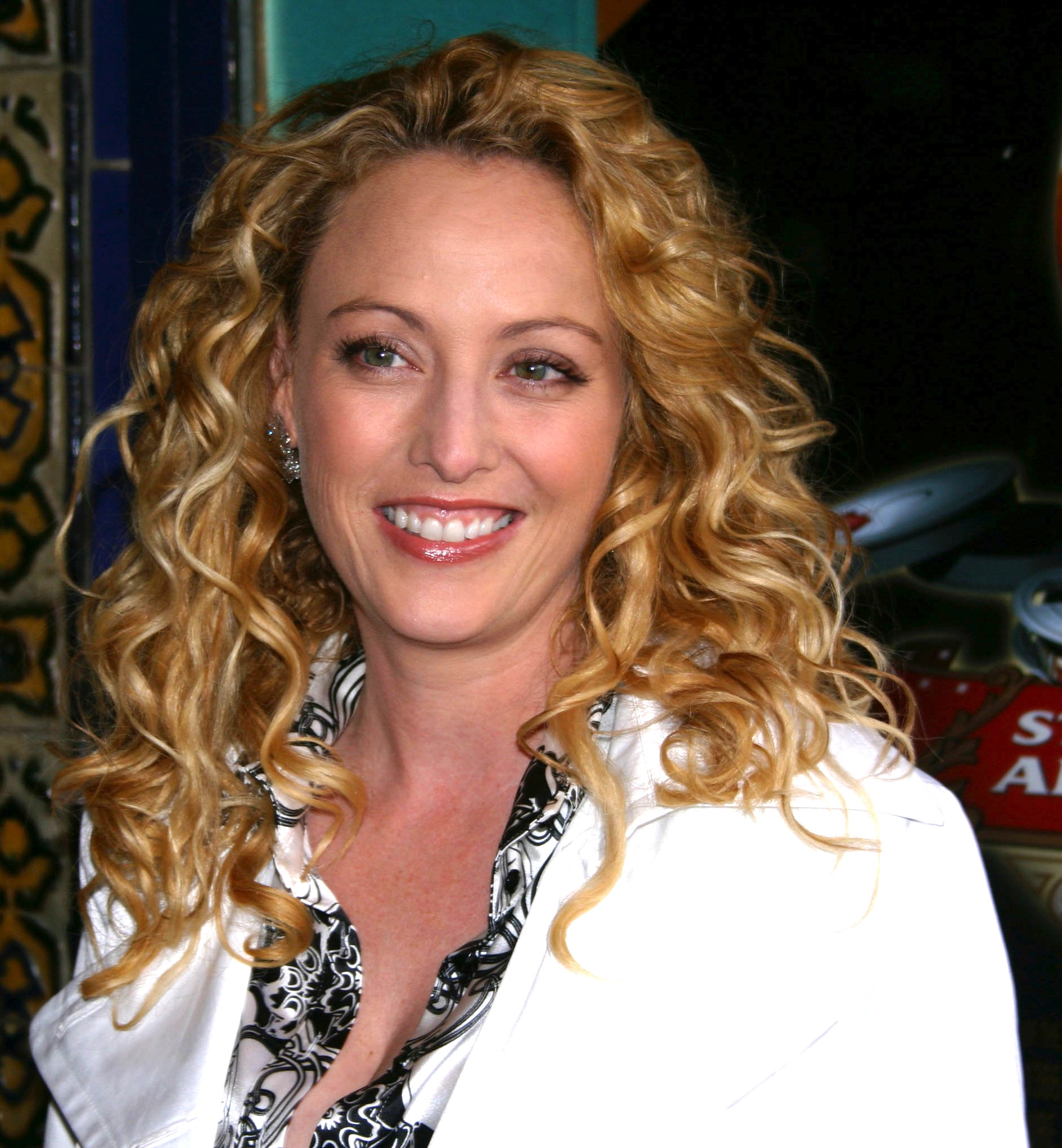
Virginia Madsen, Best Supporting Actress winner

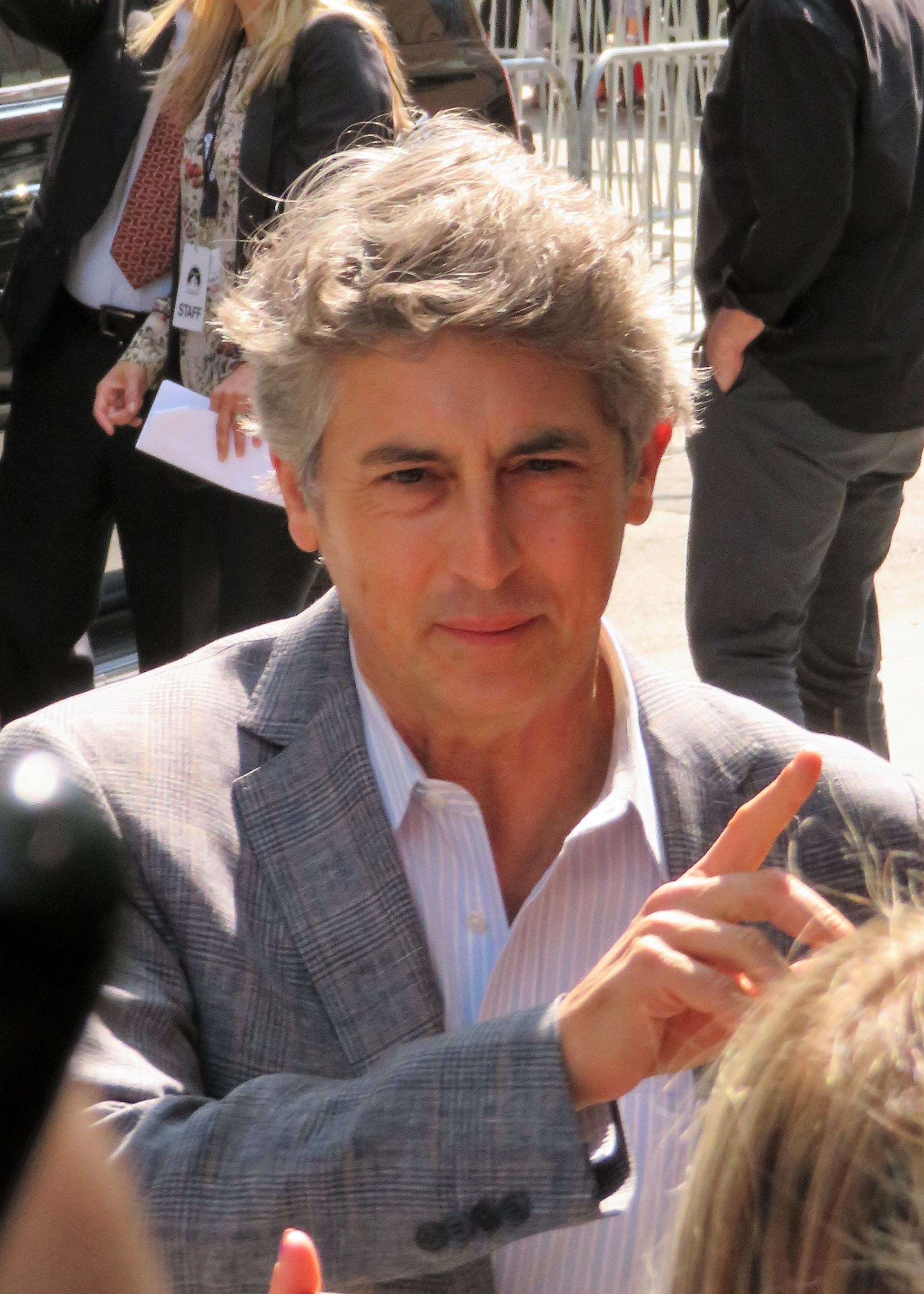
Alexander Payne, Best Screenplay co-winner

- Best Actor:
  - Paul Giamatti – Sideways
  - Runners-up: Jamie Foxx – Ray, Don Cheadle – Hotel Rwanda, and Clint Eastwood – Million Dollar Baby
- Best Actress:
  - Imelda Staunton – Vera Drake
  - Runners-up: Kate Winslet – Eternal Sunshine of the Spotless Mind and Annette Bening – Being Julia
- Best Animated Feature:
  - The Incredibles
- Best Cinematography:
  - Christopher Doyle – Hero (Ying xiong)
- Best Director:
  - Clint Eastwood – Million Dollar Baby
  - Runner-up: Zhang Yimou – House of Flying Daggers (Shi mian mai fu)
- Best Film:
  - Sideways
  - Runners-up: Eternal Sunshine of the Spotless Mind, Million Dollar Baby, and Kinsey
- Best First Film:
  - Joshua Marston – Maria Full of Grace
- Best Foreign Language Film:
  - Bad Education (La mala educación) • Spain
- Best Non-Fiction Film:
  - Fahrenheit 9/11
  - Runner-up: Tarnation
- Best Screenplay:
  - Alexander Payne and Jim Taylor – Sideways
  - Runner-up: Charlie Kaufman – Eternal Sunshine of the Spotless Mind
- Best Supporting Actor:
  - Clive Owen – Closer
  - Runner-up: Thomas Haden Church – Sideways
- Best Supporting Actress:
  - Virginia Madsen – Sideways
- Special Award:
  - Milestone Films
