= Florida Film Critics Circle Awards 2004 =

Annual US film awards ceremony

9th FFCC Awards

December 22, 2004

Best Film:
Sideways

The 9th Florida Film Critics Circle Awards were held on December 22, 2004.

== Winners ==
- Best Actor:
  - Jamie Foxx - Ray
- Best Actress:
  - Hilary Swank - Million Dollar Baby
- Best Animated Film:
  - The Incredibles
- Best Cinematography:
  - Christopher Doyle - Hero
- Best Director:
  - Alexander Payne - Sideways
- Best Documentary Film:
  - Fahrenheit 9/11
- Best Film:
  - Sideways
- Best Foreign Language Film:
  - A Very Long Engagement (Un long dimanche de fiançailles) • France/United States
- Best Screenplay:
  - Sideways - Alexander Payne and Jim Taylor
- Best Supporting Actor:
  - Thomas Haden Church - Sideways
- Best Supporting Actress:
  - Laura Linney - Kinsey
- Pauline Kael Breakout Award:
  - Zach Braff - Garden State
- Golden Orange for Outstanding Contribution to Film:
  - Jay Boyar
