= National Board of Review Awards 2004 =

Annual US film awards ceremony

76th NBR Awards

January 11, 2005

Best Film:
Finding Neverland

The 76th (US) National Board of Review Awards, honoring the best in film for 2004, were given on 11 January 2005.

== Top 10 films ==
1. Finding Neverland
2. The Aviator
3. Closer
4. Million Dollar Baby
5. Sideways
6. Kinsey
7. Vera Drake
8. Ray
9. Collateral
10. Hotel Rwanda

== Top Foreign Films ==
1. The Sea Inside (Mar adentro)
2. Bad Education (La mala educación)
3. Maria Full of Grace (María llena eres de gracia)
4. The Chorus (Les choristes)
5. The Motorcycle Diaries (Los diarios de motocicleta)

== Top Five Documentaries ==
1. Born into Brothels
2. Z Channel: A Magnificent Obsession
3. Paper Clips Project
4. Super Size Me
5. The Story of the Weeping Camel

== Winners ==
- Best Film:
  - Finding Neverland
- Best Foreign Language Film:
  - Mar adentro (The Sea Inside), Spain/France/Italy
- Best Actor:
  - Jamie Foxx - Ray
- Best Actress:
  - Annette Bening - Being Julia
- Best Supporting Actor:
  - Thomas Haden Church - Sideways
- Best Supporting Actress:
  - Laura Linney - Kinsey
- Best Acting by an Ensemble:
  - Closer
- Breakthrough Performance Actor:
  - Topher Grace - In Good Company and P.S.
- Breakthrough Performance Actress:
  - Emmy Rossum - The Phantom of the Opera
- Best Director:
  - Michael Mann - Collateral
- Best Directorial Debut:
  - Zach Braff - Garden State
- Best Screenplay - Adapted:
  - Sideways - Alexander Payne and Jim Taylor
- Best Screenplay - Original:
  - Eternal Sunshine of the Spotless Mind - Charlie Kaufman
- Best Documentary:
  - Born into Brothels
- Best Animated Feature:
  - The Incredibles
- Career Achievement:
  - Jeff Bridges
- Billy Wilder Award for Excellence in Directing:
  - Miloš Forman
- Special Filmmaking Achievement:
  - Clint Eastwood, for producing, directing, acting, and scoring Million Dollar Baby
- Outstanding Production Design:
  - House of Flying Daggers
- Outstanding Film Music Composition:
  - Jan A. P. Kaczmarek - Finding Neverland
- Career Achievement - Cinematography:
  - Caleb Deschanel
- William K. Everson Award for Film History:
  - Richard Schickel
- Producers Award:
  - Jerry Bruckheimer
- Freedom of Expression:
  - Fahrenheit 9/11
  - The Passion of the Christ
  - Conspiracy of Silence
- Special Recognition For Excellence In Filmmaking:
  - The Assassination of Richard Nixon
  - Before Sunset
  - The Door in the Floor
  - Enduring Love
  - Eternal Sunshine of the Spotless Mind
  - Facing Windows
  - Garden State
  - A Home at the End of the World
  - Imaginary Heroes
  - Since Otar Left
  - Stage Beauty
  - Undertow
  - The Woodsman
