= Boston Society of Film Critics Awards 2004 =

25th Boston Society of Film Critics Awards

25th BSFC Awards

December 13, 2004

Best Film:
Sideways

The 25th Boston Society of Film Critics Awards, honoring the best in filmmaking in 2004, were given on 13 December 2004.

== Winners ==
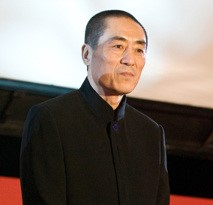
Zhang Yimou, Best Director winner

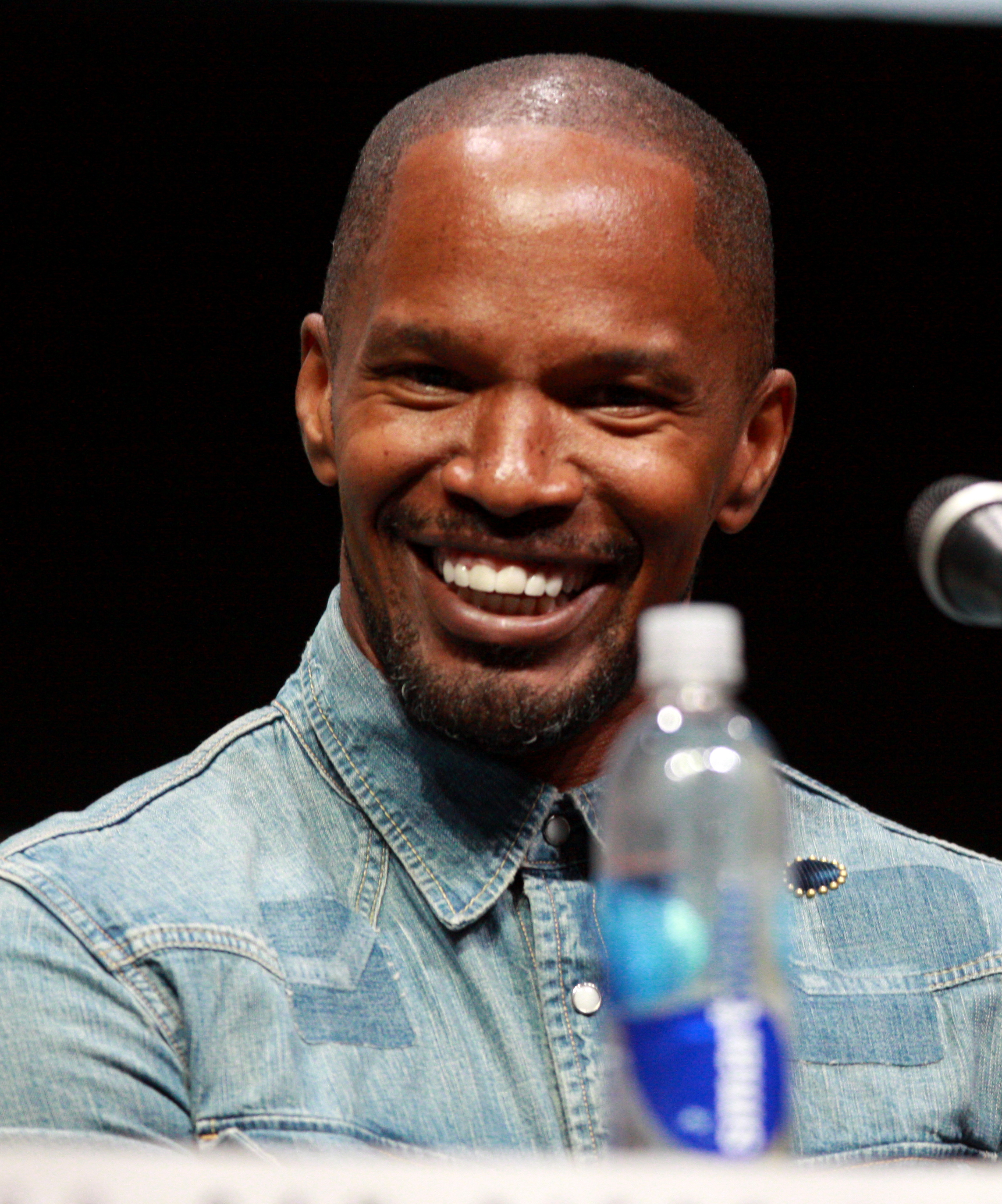
Jamie Foxx, Best Actor winner

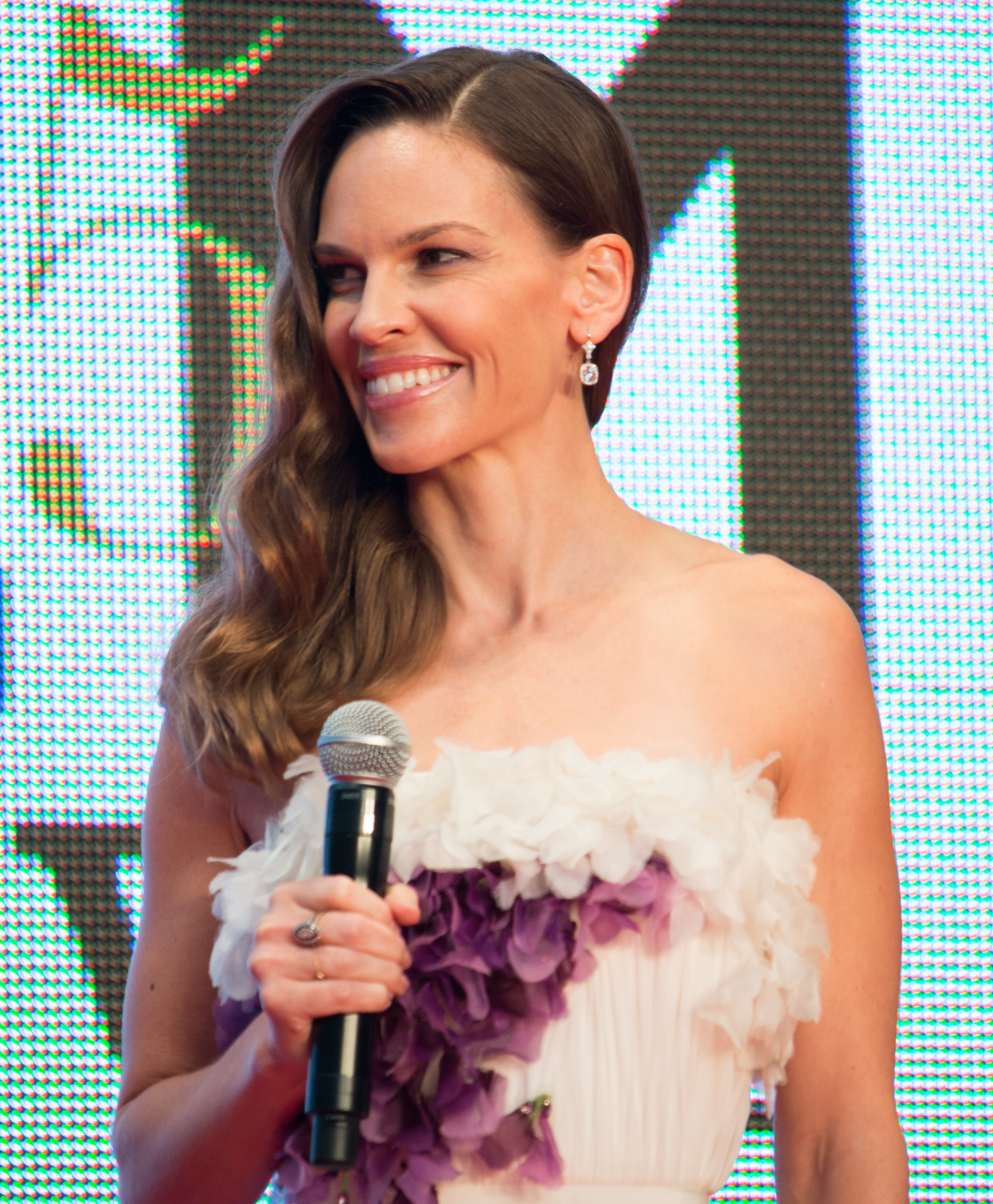
Hilary Swank, Best Actress winner

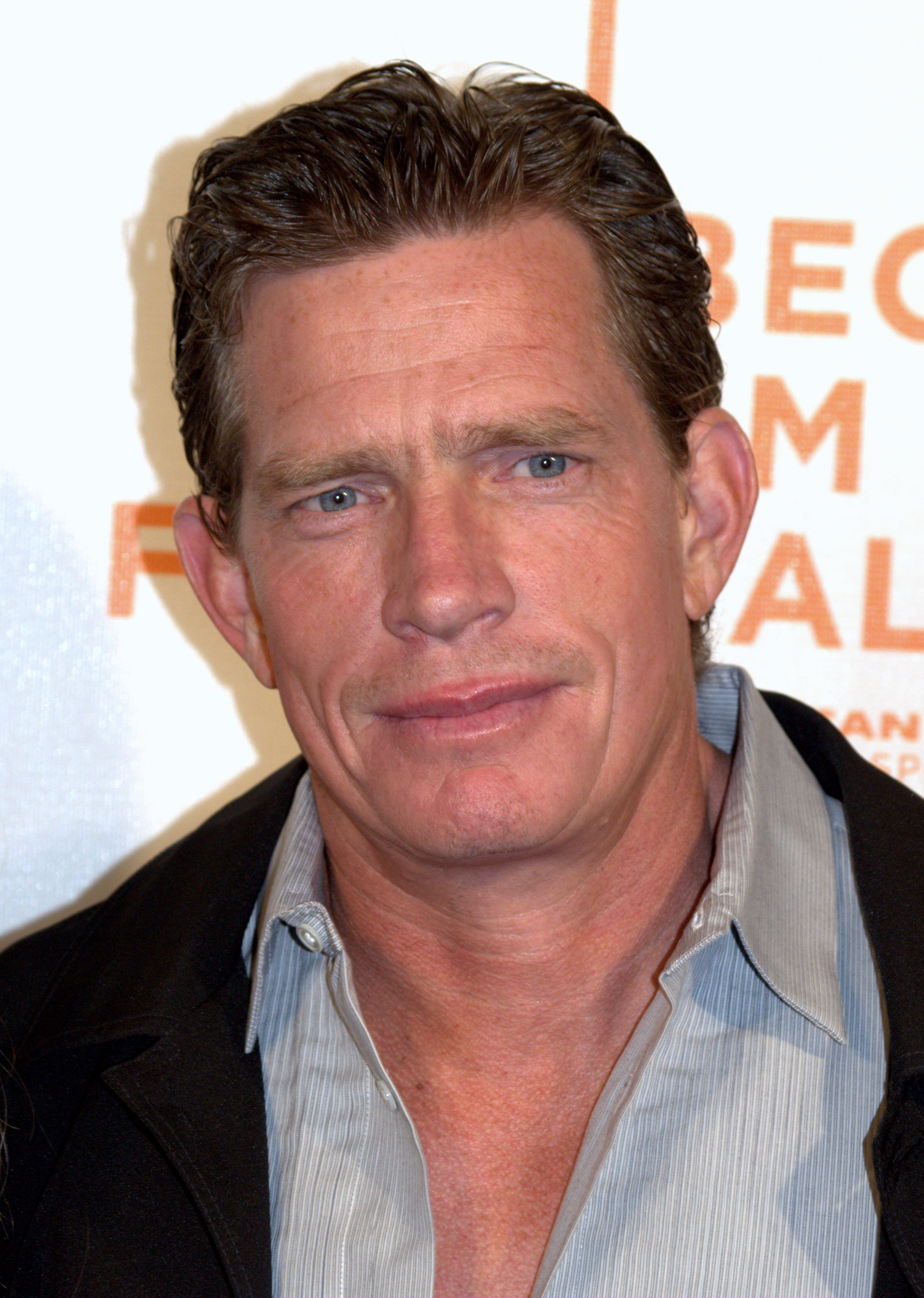
Thomas Haden Church, Best Supporting Actor winner

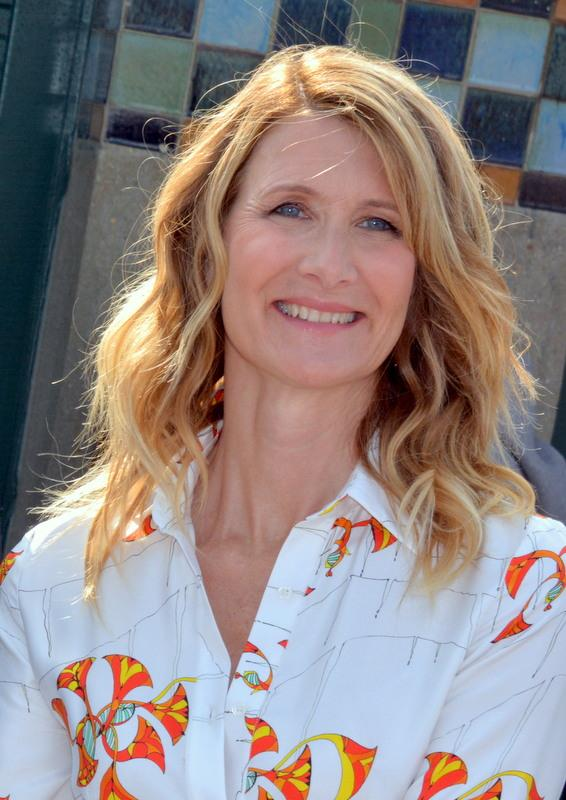
Laura Dern, Best Supporting Actress winner

- Best Film:
  - Sideways
  - Runner-up: Before Sunset
- Best Actor:
  - Jamie Foxx – Ray
  - Runner-up: Paul Giamatti – Sideways
- Best Actress:
  - Hilary Swank – Million Dollar Baby
  - Runner-up (TIE): Annette Bening – Being Julia and Kim Basinger – The Door in the Floor
- Best Supporting Actor:
  - Thomas Haden Church – Sideways
  - Runner-up: Clive Owen – Closer
- Best Supporting Actress (TIE):
  - Laura Dern – We Don't Live Here Anymore
  - Sharon Warren – Ray
  - Runner-up: Cate Blanchett – The Aviator
- Best Director:
  - Zhang Yimou – House of Flying Daggers (Shi mian mai fu)
  - Runner-up: Alexander Payne – Sideways
- Best Screenplay:
  - Alexander Payne and Jim Taylor – Sideways
  - Runner-up: Charlie Kaufman – Eternal Sunshine of the Spotless Mind
- Best Cinematography:
  - Zhao Xiaoding – House of Flying Daggers (Shi mian mai fu)
  - Runner-up: Bruno Delbonnel – A Very Long Engagement (Un long dimanche de fiançailles)
- Best Documentary:
  - Control Room
  - Runner-up: Touching the Void
- Best Foreign-Language Film:
  - House of Flying Daggers (Shi mian mai fu) • China/Hong Kong
  - Runner-up: A Very Long Engagement (Un long dimanche de fiançailles) • France/United States
- Best New Filmmaker:
  - Jonathan Caouette – Tarnation
  - Runner-up (TIE): Nicole Kassell – The Woodsman and Joshua Marston – Maria Full of Grace
- Best Ensemble Cast:
  - Sideways
  - Runner-up: The Life Aquatic with Steve Zissou
