= London Film Critics Circle Awards 2004 =

British film awards ceremony

25th London Film Critics Circle Awards

9 February 2005

Film of the Year:
Sideways

British Film of the Year:
Vera Drake

The 25th London Film Critics Circle Awards, honouring the best in film for 2004, were announced by the London Film Critics Circle on 9 February 2005.

== Winners and nominees ==
=== Film of the Year ===
Sideways

- The Aviator
- Eternal Sunshine of the Spotless Mind
- House of Flying Daggers
- The Motorcycle Diaries

=== British Film of the Year ===
Vera Drake

- Finding Neverland
- Ae Fond Kiss...
- My Summer of Love
- Shaun of the Dead

=== Foreign Language Film of the Year ===
The Motorcycle Diaries • Argentina

- Bad Education • Spain
- House of Flying Daggers • China/Hong Kong
- The Return • Russia
- A Very Long Engagement • France

=== Director of the Year ===
Martin Scorsese – The Aviator

- Michel Gondry – Eternal Sunshine of the Spotless Mind
- Alexander Payne – Sideways
- Walter Salles – The Motorcycle Diaries
- Zhang Yimou – House of Flying Daggers

=== British Director of the Year ===
Mike Leigh – Vera Drake

- Paul Greengrass – The Bourne Supremacy
- Shane Meadows – Dead Man's Shoes
- Pawel Pawlikowski – My Summer of Love
- Michael Radford – The Merchant of Venice

=== Screenwriter of the Year ===
Charlie Kaufman – Eternal Sunshine of the Spotless Mind

- David Magee – Finding Neverland
- Brad Bird – The Incredibles
- Jean-Pierre Bacri and Agnes Jaoui – Look at Me
- Alexander Payne and Jim Taylor – Sideways

=== British Screenwriter of the Year ===
Mike Leigh – Vera Drake

- Joe Penhall – Enduring Love
- Paul Laverty – Ae Fond Kiss...
- Pawel Pawlikowski and Michael Wynne – My Summer of Love
- Simon Pegg and Edgar Wright – Shaun of the Dead

=== Actor of the Year ===
Jamie Foxx – Ray

- Johnny Depp – Finding Neverland
- Leonardo DiCaprio – The Aviator
- Paul Giamatti – Sideways
- Geoffrey Rush – The Life and Death of Peter Sellers

=== Actress of the Year ===
Imelda Staunton – Vera Drake

- Annette Bening – Being Julia
- Nicole Kidman – Birth
- Natalie Portman – Closer
- Charlize Theron – Monster

=== British Actor of the Year ===
Daniel Craig – Enduring Love

- Paddy Considine – Dead Man's Shoes
- Ben Kingsley – House of Sand and Fog
- James McAvoy – Inside I'm Dancing
- Clive Owen – Closer

=== British Actress of the Year ===
Eva Birthistle – Ae Fond Kiss...
Kate Winslet – Eternal Sunshine of the Spotless Mind

- Judi Dench – Ladies in Lavender
- Emily Mortimer – Dear Frankie
- Natalie Press – My Summer of Love

=== British Supporting Actor of the Year ===
Phil Davis – Vera Drake

- Brian Cox – Troy
- Rupert Everett – Stage Beauty
- Eddie Marsan – Vera Drake
- Alfred Molina – Spider-Man 2

=== British Supporting Actress of the Year ===
Romola Garai – Inside I'm Dancing

- Eileen Atkins – Vanity Fair
- Minnie Driver – The Phantom of the Opera
- Ruth Sheen – Vera Drake
- Emily Woof – Wondrous Oblivion

=== British Newcomer of the Year ===
Natalie Press – My Summer of Love

- Amma Asante – A Way of Life
- Eva Birthistle – Ae Fond Kiss...
- Emily Blunt – My Summer of Love
- Freddie Highmore – Finding Neverland

=== 25th Silver Anniversary Award ===
- Norma Heyman

=== Dilys Powell Award ===
- Ken Loach
