= San Francisco Film Critics Circle Awards 2004 =

Annual US film awards ceremony

3rd SFFCC Awards

December 13, 2004

Best Picture:
Sideways

The 3rd San Francisco Film Critics Circle Awards, honoring the best in film for 2004, were given on December 13, 2004.

== Winners ==
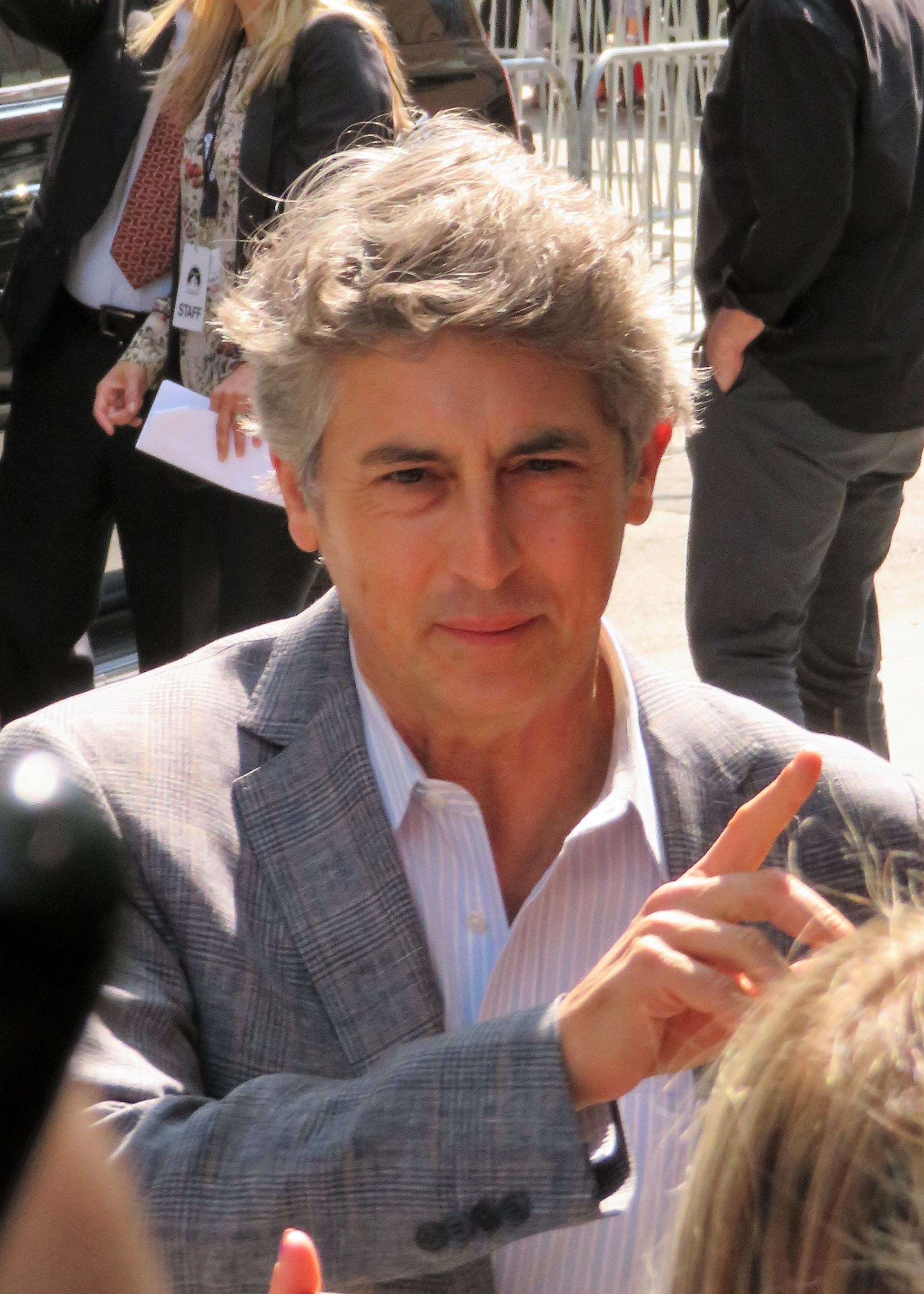
Alexander Payne, Best Director winner

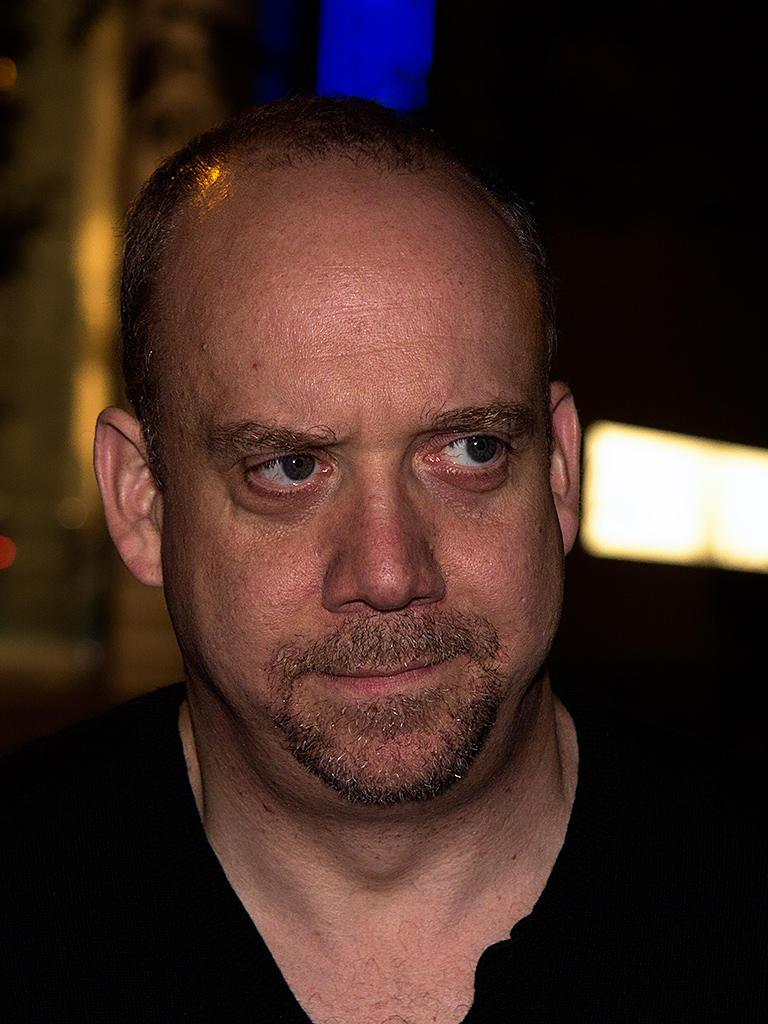
Paul Giamatti, Best Actor winner

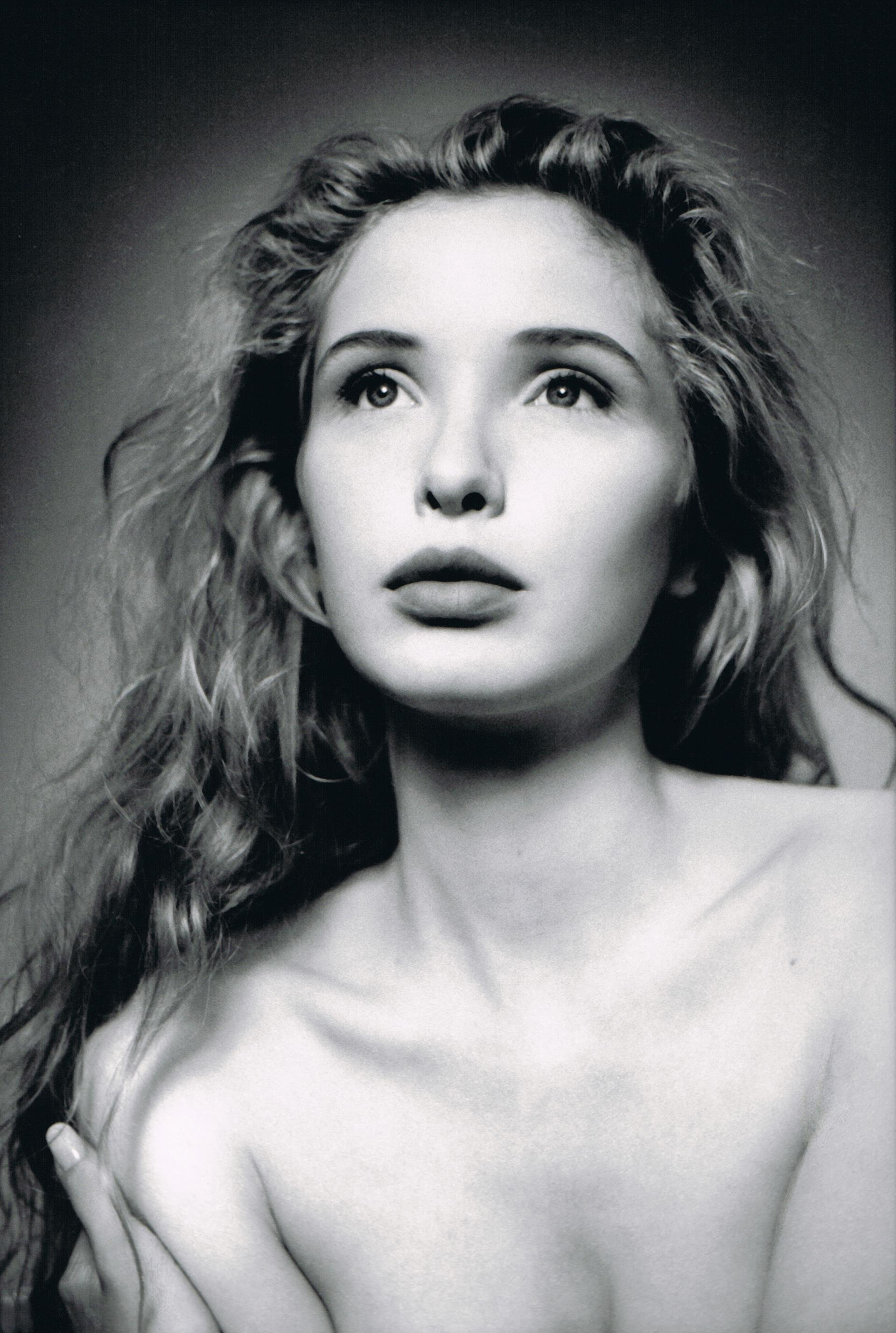
Julie Delpy, Best Actress winner

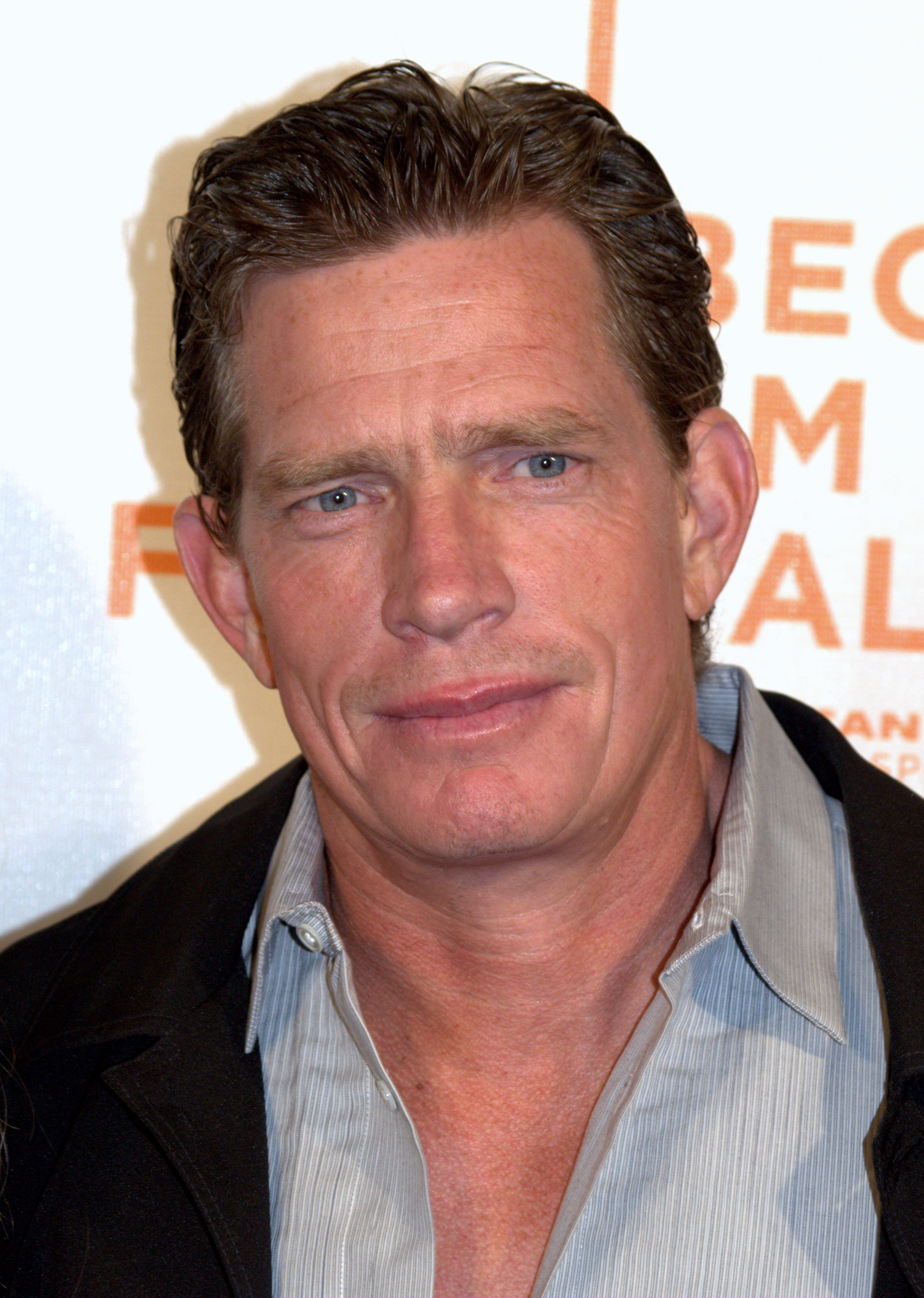
Thomas Haden Church, Best Supporting Actor winner

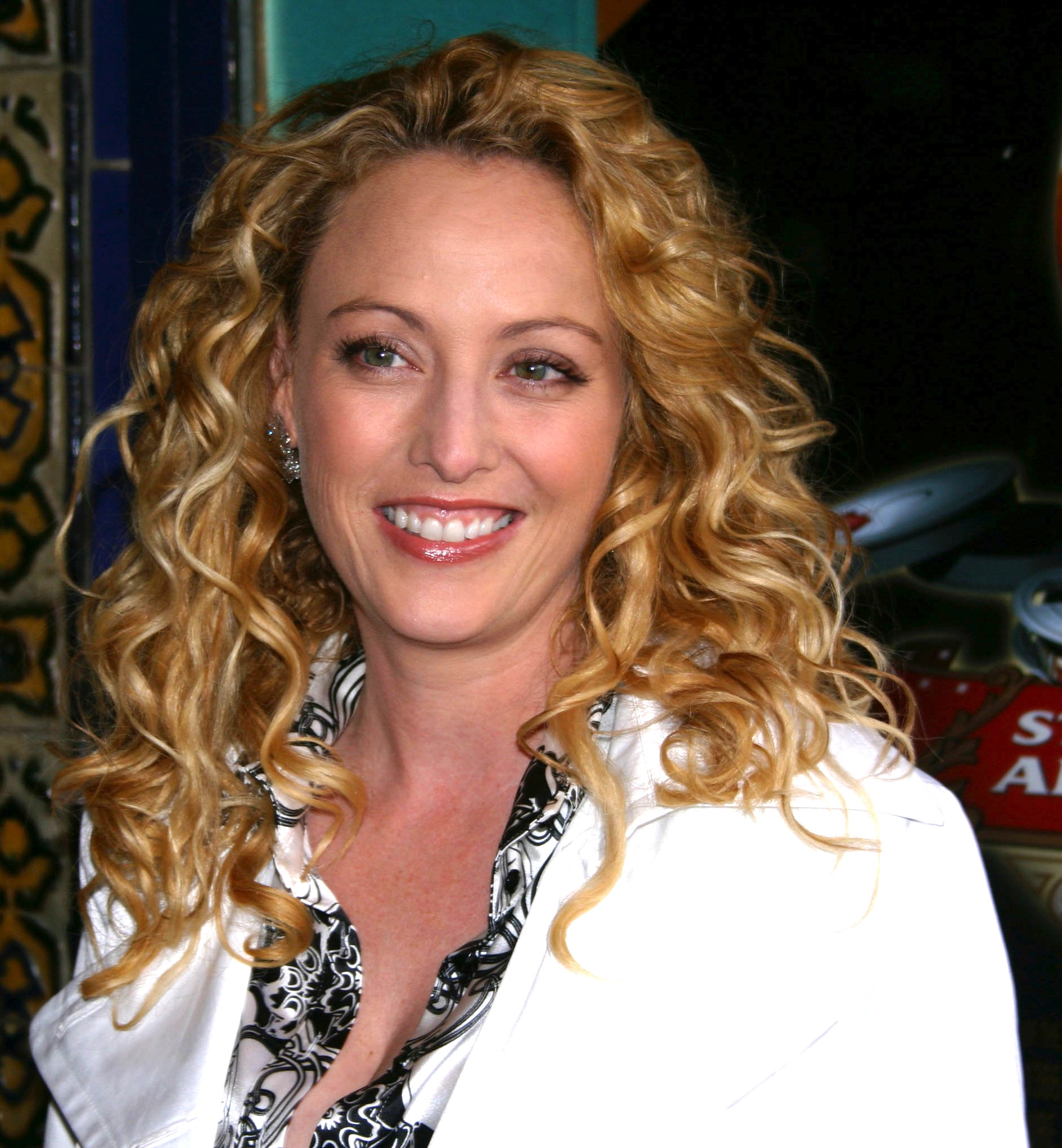
Virginia Madsen, Best Supporting Actress winner

- Best Picture:
  - Sideways
- Best Director:
  - Alexander Payne - Sideways
- Best Screenplay:
  - Sideways - Alexander Payne and Jim Taylor
- Best Actor:
  - Paul Giamatti - Sideways
- Best Actress:
  - Julie Delpy - Before Sunset
- Best Supporting Actor:
  - Thomas Haden Church - Sideways
- Best Supporting Actress:
  - Virginia Madsen - Sideways
- Best Foreign Language Film:
  - Maria Full of Grace • Colombia/United States/Ecuador
- Best Documentary:
  - Fahrenheit 9/11
- Marlon Riggs Award (for courage & vision in the Bay Area film community):
  - Anita Monga, former programmer for the Castro Theatre
