= Sideways =

2004 American comedy-drama film by Alexander Payne

- Theatrical release poster
- Directed by: Alexander Payne
- Screenplay by: Alexander Payne; Jim Taylor
- Based on: Sideways by Rex Pickett
- Produced by: Michael London
- Starring: Paul Giamatti; Thomas Haden Church; Virginia Madsen; Sandra Oh
- Cinematography: Phedon Papamichael
- Edited by: Kevin Tent
- Music by: Rolfe Kent
- Production company: Michael London Productions
- Distributed by: Fox Searchlight Pictures
- Release dates: September 13, 2004 (TIFF); October 22, 2004 (United States)
- Running time: 127 minutes
- Country: United States
- Language: English
- Budget: $16 million
- Box office: $109.7 million

Sideways is a 2004 American comedy-drama film directed by Alexander Payne and written by Jim Taylor and Payne. A film adaptation of Rex Pickett's 2004 novel, Sideways follows two men in their forties, Miles Raymond (Paul Giamatti), a depressed teacher and unsuccessful writer, and Jack Cole (Thomas Haden Church), a past-his-prime actor, who take a week-long road trip to Santa Barbara County wine country to celebrate Jack's upcoming wedding. Sandra Oh and Virginia Madsen also star as women they encounter during their trip.

Sideways premiered at the Toronto International Film Festival on September 13, 2004, and was released in the United States on October 22, 2004 by Fox Searchlight Pictures. It received widespread acclaim from critics and is regarded as one of the greatest films of the 2000s. At the 77th Academy Awards, the film was nominated for Best Picture, Best Director, Best Supporting Actor (Haden Church), Best Supporting Actress (Madsen), and Best Adapted Screenplay, the last of which it won.

== Plot ==
Miles Raymond picks up his friend Jack Cole at the home of Jack’s fiancée to begin a week together in advance of Jack’s wedding. Miles, a school teacher and unpublished author, starts the trip at his mother’s house, ostensibly to wish her a happy birthday, but Miles steals money before they leave.

Miles wants to spend the week relaxing, playing golf, and enjoying good food and wine. However, Jack is interested in trying to cure Miles’ depression over his professional failures and divorce by finding him a sex partner. Jack is ambivalent over his pending marriage and the prospect of giving up his acting ambitions in favor of a job with his fiancée’s father. In the Santa Ynez valley, Miles, an oenophile, teaches Jack how to taste wine. The pair dine at The Hitching Post II. Jack infers that Maya, a waitress with whom Miles is casually acquainted, is interested in Miles. Jack tells Maya that Miles' manuscript has been accepted for publication, although it is only being considered.

The next morning Jack announces his intention to find sex partners during the trip. That night, he arranges a double date for himself and Miles with a wine pourer named Stephanie, who is also acquainted with Maya.

During the date, Miles gets drunk and telephones Victoria, his ex-wife, after learning from Jack that she has remarried and will be bringing her new husband to Jack's wedding. The couples go to Stephanie's house, where Stephanie and Jack adjourn to Stephanie's bedroom, leaving Miles and Maya alone. The two connect through their mutual interest in wine, and Miles kisses Maya awkwardly. As they part, Miles gives Maya a copy of his manuscript, which she had earlier expressed interest in reading.

Jack claims to have fallen in love with Stephanie and tells Miles he wants to postpone the wedding and move to the Santa Ynez Valley to be closer to her. After spending time with Jack and Stephanie at wineries and a picnic, Miles and Maya return to Maya's apartment and have sex. The next day, Miles accidentally reveals to Maya that Jack is getting married. Disgusted with the men's dishonesty, Maya dumps Miles.

Jack and Miles go to a winery that Miles finds subpar. After hearing from his literary agent that his manuscript has been rejected, an upset Miles pesters the pourer for a full glass of wine. When the server refuses, Miles drinks from the spit bucket, creating a scene. Jack intervenes and drives Miles back to the motel. Upon arrival, Stephanie, who heard from Maya about Jack's marital status, furiously beats Jack with her motorcycle helmet, breaking his nose, while berating him for his dishonesty. Miles takes Jack to the ER and leaves Maya an apologetic voice message, admitting that his book will not be published.

That night, despite Miles' protests, Jack goes home with a waitress named Cammi. Jack returns to the motel naked after Cammi's husband had caught the two having sex. Jack begs Miles to help him retrieve his wallet, which contains custom wedding rings. Miles sneaks into the house, where he finds Cammi and her husband having sex. He grabs the wallet and runs, barely escaping Cammi's nude and furious husband. On the drive back to San Diego, Jack intentionally drives Miles's car into a tree to support his alibi that he broke his nose in a car accident. The pair return to Christine's home, where Jack is warmly received by her family.

Following the wedding ceremony, Miles runs into Victoria and meets her new husband, Ken. Victoria says she is pregnant. Miles absconds before the reception and drives back to his San Diego apartment. Alone, he drinks his prized wine, a 1961 Château Cheval Blanc, from a disposable styrofoam soda cup at a fast-food restaurant. One day, Miles receives a voicemail from Maya, saying she loved his manuscript, encouraging him to keep writing, and inviting him to visit. Miles drives back to wine country and knocks on Maya's door.

== Cast ==
- Paul Giamatti as Miles Raymond
- Thomas Haden Church as Jack Cole
- Virginia Madsen as Maya Randall
- Sandra Oh as Stephanie
- Marylouise Burke as Mrs. Raymond, Miles' mother
- Jessica Hecht as Victoria Cortland
- Lee Brooks as Ken Cortland
- Missy Doty as Cammi
- MC Gainey as Cammi's husband
- Alysia Reiner as Christine Erganian
- Shake Tukhmanyan as Mrs. Erganian
- Shaun Duke as Mike Erganian
- Stephanie Faracy as Stephanie's mother
- Natalie Carter as Siena, Stephanie's daughter
- Patrick Gallagher as Gary the Bartender
- Joe Marinelli as Frass Canyon Pourer

== Impact on wine industry ==
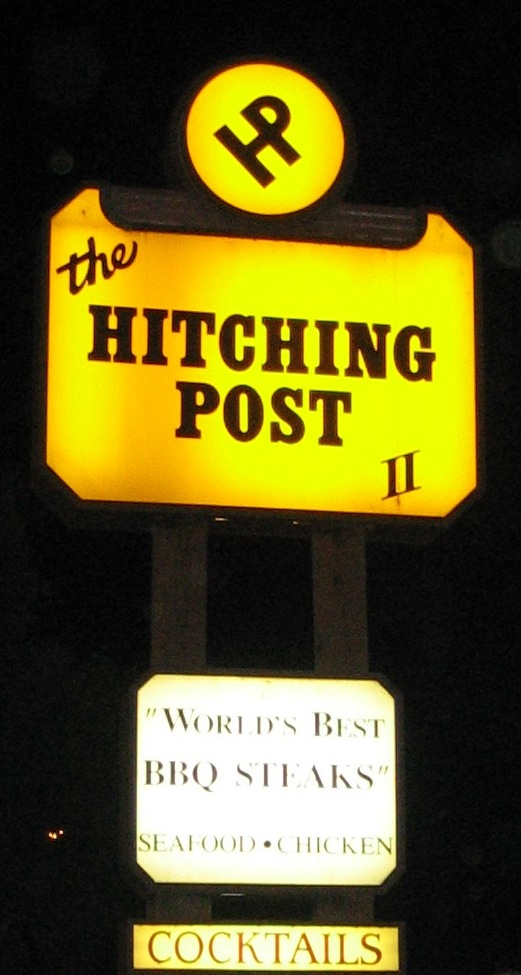
The Hitching Post II Restaurant in Buellton where Miles and Jack first encounter Maya.

Wineries and locations in the Santa Ynez Valley are prominently featured in the film, drawing attention and increased enotourism to the Sta. Rita Hills wine region in Santa Barbara County and California's Central Coast. During the film, Miles speaks fondly of the red wine varietal Pinot noir while denigrating Merlot. After the film's U.S. release in October 2004, Merlot sales dropped 2% while Pinot noir sales increased 16% in the Western United States. A similar trend occurred in British wine outlets.

A 2009 study by Sonoma State University found that Sideways slowed the growth in Merlot sales volume and caused its price to fall, but the film's main effect on the U.S. wine industry was a rise in the sales volume and price of Pinot noir and in overall wine consumption.

A 2022 study in the Journal of Wine Economics found that Sideways caused a reduction in demand for Merlot and an increase in demand for Pinot noir in the United States, which led California winemakers to grow Pinot noir grapes in unsuitable land and blend those grapes with the grapes grown in high-quality areas just to meet demand, which may have led to worse Pinot noir wines.

Sideways Fest is an annual 3-day event hosted by the Sta. Rita Hills Wine Alliance celebrating the movie's release featuring the local viticulture and scenery.

=== Sideways Pinot noir ===
In 2013, Rex Pickett, author of the Sideways novel, released his own Pinot noir named Le Plus Ultra. In 2020, he released a Pinot noir named Sideways.

== Soundtrack ==
Sideways

Soundtrack album by Rolfe Kent
- Released: October 12, 2004
- Recorded: 2004
- Genres: Jazz; film score
- Length: 37:24
- Label: New Line
- Producer: Rolfe Kent

Rolfe Kent chronology
Mean Girls (2004)	''Sideways'' (2004)	The Last Shot (2004)

The original soundtrack album features 15 jazz instrumentals composed and produced by Rolfe Kent and was orchestrated and arranged for the band by Tony Blondal. The album was nominated for the Golden Globe Award for "Best Original Score", and the music proved so popular there was demand for a national tour. Eventually, a few cities were chosen to perform in as the composer was too busy to commit to more. The romantic leitmotif shared by Miles and Maya is excerpted from Symbiosis by Claus Ogerman and Bill Evans.

=== Track listing ===
All tracks are written by Rolfe Kent.

No.	Title	Length
1.	"Asphalt Groovin'"	4:00
2.	"Constantine Snaps His Fingers"	3:03
3.	"Drive!"	3:56
4.	"Picnic"	2:15
5.	"Lonely Day"	1:40
6.	"Wine Safari"	2:13
7.	"Miles' Theme"	2:59
8.	"Los Olivos"	2:43
9.	"Chasing the Golfers"	3:03
10.	"Walk to Hitching Post"	2:32
11.	"Abandoning the Wedding"	3:25
12.	"Slipping Away As Mum Sleeps"	1:00
13.	"Bowling Tango"	0:49
14.	"I'm Not Drinking Any #@%!$ Merlot!"	1:13
15.	"Miles And Maya"	2:26
Total length:		37:24

== Reception ==
On review aggregator Rotten Tomatoes, Sideways has an approval rating of 97% based on 230 reviews, and an average rating of 8.8/10. The website's critical consensus reads: "Charming, thoughtful, and often funny, Sideways is a decidedly mature road trip comedy full of excellent performances." On Metacritic, the film has a weighted average score of 94 out of 100 based on 42 reviews, indicating "universal acclaim". Audiences polled by CinemaScore gave the film an average grade of "B" on an A+ to F scale.

Time Out described the film as "intelligent, funny and moving", and Roger Ebert of the Chicago Sun-Times gave it four stars out of four, writing that "what happens during the seven days adds up to the best human comedy of the year – comedy, because it is funny, and human, because it is surprisingly moving".

With the exception of Giamatti, who had already starred in the critically acclaimed film American Splendor (2003), the film was a career breakthrough for the stars. Church and Madsen were each nominated for the Screen Actors Guild Award, Golden Globe Award, and Academy Award for their performances, winning the Broadcast Film Critics Association Award and Independent Spirit Award for their respective categories. Giamatti was described as "The World's Best Character Actor" by Time magazine. In 2005, Sandra Oh went on to star in the ABC medical drama Grey's Anatomy, for which she won two Screen Actors Guild Awards and one Golden Globe Award.

Sideways was ranked 494th on Empire's 2008 list of the 500 greatest movies of all time. Total Film put Sideways on its list of 100 Greatest Movies of All Time. In 2006, the Writers Guild of America also ranked its script as the 90th greatest ever written. The February 2020 issue of New York Magazine lists Sideways as among "The Best Movies That Lost Best Picture at the Oscars." In 2021, members of Writers Guild of America West (WGAW) and Writers Guild of America, East (WGAE) ranked its screenplay 15th in WGA’s 101 Greatest Screenplays of the 21st Century (so far). In 2025, it was one of the films voted for the "Readers' Choice" edition of The New York Times' list of "The 100 Best Movies of the 21st Century," finishing at number 173.

== Stage and musical adaptations ==
In 2019, it was announced that Sideways was scheduled to be adapted for a stage musical. Kathleen Marshall is expected to be the director and choreographer for the musical, which was aiming for a spring or summer 2020 tryout in a regional venue prior to Broadway. The musical will have a book by Rex Pickett and the score by Anthony Leigh Adams.

A play adapted by author Rex Pickett from the Sideways novel was produced at multiple theaters in the United States and the United Kingdom, including at the La Jolla Playhouse.

In addition to the musical, it was reported that Pickett had written screenplays based on his two Sideways sequels already in print, Vertical and Sideways 3 Chile.

== Accolades ==
As of 2022, Payne and Taylor are the only two screenwriters to ever sweep the rarest achievements known as "The Big Four" critics awards (LAFCA, NBR, NYFCC, NSFC), in addition to winning the Oscar, Globe, BAFTA, WGA, and Critic's Choice Awards for the film.

Awards
Award	Category	Name	Result
American Film Institute Awards	AFI Movie of the Year		Won
77th Academy Awards	Best Picture	Michael London	Nominated
77th Academy Awards	Best Director	Alexander Payne	Nominated
77th Academy Awards	Best Supporting Actor	Thomas Haden Church	Nominated
77th Academy Awards	Best Supporting Actress	Virginia Madsen	Nominated
77th Academy Awards	Best Adapted Screenplay	Alexander Payne and Jim Taylor	Won
American Cinema Editors	Best Edited Feature Film – Comedy or Musical	Kevin Tent	Nominated
Argentine Film Critics Association	Best Foreign Film, Not in Spanish Language	Alexander Payne	Won
Belgian Syndicate of Cinema Critics	Grand Prix		Nominated
58th British Academy Film Awards	Best Adapted Screenplay	Alexander Payne and Jim Taylor	Won
Bodil Awards	Best American Film	Alexander Payne	Won
Boston Society of Film Critics Awards	Best Film		Won
Boston Society of Film Critics Awards	Best Director	Alexander Payne	2nd Place
Boston Society of Film Critics Awards	Best Actor	Paul Giamatti	2nd Place
Boston Society of Film Critics Awards	Best Supporting Actor	Thomas Haden Church	Won
Boston Society of Film Critics Awards	Best Cast	Thomas Haden Church, Paul Giamatti, Virginia Madsen, and Sandra Oh	Won
Boston Society of Film Critics Awards	Best Screenplay	Alexander Payne and Jim Taylor	Won
Broadcast Film Critics Association Awards	Best Film		Won
Broadcast Film Critics Association Awards	Best Director	Alexander Payne	Nominated
Broadcast Film Critics Association Awards	Best Actor	Paul Giamatti	Nominated
Broadcast Film Critics Association Awards	Best Supporting Actor	Thomas Haden Church	Won
Broadcast Film Critics Association Awards	Best Supporting Actress	Virginia Madsen	Won
Broadcast Film Critics Association Awards	Best Cast	Thomas Haden Church, Paul Giamatti, Virginia Madsen, and Sandra Oh	Won
Broadcast Film Critics Association Awards	Best Screenplay	Alexander Payne and Jim Taylor	Won
Broadcast Film Critics Association Awards	Best Composer	Rolfe Kent	Nominated
Casting Society of America Awards	Best Feature Film Casting – Comedy	John Jackson and Ellen Parks	Won
Chicago Film Critics Association Awards	Best Film		Won
Chicago Film Critics Association Awards	Best Actor	Paul Giamatti	Won
Chicago Film Critics Association Awards	Best Supporting Actor	Thomas Haden Church	Won
Chicago Film Critics Association Awards	Best Supporting Actress	Virginia Madsen	Won
Chicago Film Critics Association Awards	Best Screenplay	Alexander Payne and Jim Taylor	Won
Czech Lion	Best Foreign Language Film	Alexander Payne	Nominated
Dallas-Fort Worth Film Critics Association Awards	Best Film		2nd Place
Dallas-Fort Worth Film Critics Association Awards	Top 10 Films		Won
Dallas-Fort Worth Film Critics Association Awards	Best Actor	Paul Giamatti	Won
Dallas-Fort Worth Film Critics Association Awards	Best Supporting Actor	Thomas Haden Church	Won
Dallas-Fort Worth Film Critics Association Awards	Best Supporting Actress	Virginia Madsen	Won
Directors Guild of America Awards	Outstanding Directorial Achievement in Motion Pictures	Alexander Payne	Nominated
Florida Film Critics Circle Awards	Best Film		Won
Florida Film Critics Circle Awards	Best Director	Alexander Payne	Won
Florida Film Critics Circle Awards	Best Supporting Actor	Thomas Haden Church	Won
Florida Film Critics Circle Awards	Best Screenplay	Alexander Payne and Jim Taylor	Won
Golden Globe Awards	Best Motion Picture – Musical or Comedy		Won
Golden Globe Awards	Best Director – Motion Picture	Alexander Payne	Nominated
Golden Globe Awards	Best Actor in a Motion Picture – Musical or Comedy	Paul Giamatti	Nominated
Golden Globe Awards	Best Supporting Actor – Motion Picture	Thomas Haden Church	Nominated
Golden Globe Awards	Best Supporting Actress – Motion Picture	Virginia Madsen	Nominated
Golden Globe Awards	Best Screenplay – Motion Picture	Alexander Payne and Jim Taylor	Won
Golden Globe Awards	Best Original Score – Motion Picture	Rolfe Kent	Nominated
Gotham Awards	Best Film	Alexander Payne	Won
Independent Spirit Awards	Best Film	Michael London	Won
Independent Spirit Awards	Best Director	Alexander Payne	Won
Independent Spirit Awards	Best Male Lead	Paul Giamatti	Won
Independent Spirit Awards	Best Supporting Male	Thomas Haden Church	Won
Independent Spirit Awards	Best Supporting Female	Virginia Madsen	Won
Independent Spirit Awards	Best Screenplay	Alexander Payne and Jim Taylor	Won
London Film Critics Circle Awards	Film of the Year		Won
London Film Critics Circle Awards	Director of the Year	Alexander Payne	Nominated
London Film Critics Circle Awards	Actor of the Year	Paul Giamatti	Nominated
London Film Critics Circle Awards	Screenwriter of the Year	Alexander Payne and Jim Taylor	Nominated
Los Angeles Film Critics Association Awards	Best Film		Won
Los Angeles Film Critics Association Awards	Best Director	Alexander Payne	Won
Los Angeles Film Critics Association Awards	Best Actor	Paul Giamatti	2nd Place
Los Angeles Film Critics Association Awards	Best Supporting Actor	Thomas Haden Church	Won
Los Angeles Film Critics Association Awards	Best Supporting Actress	Virginia Madsen	Won
Los Angeles Film Critics Association Awards	Best Screenplay	Alexander Payne and Jim Taylor	Won
National Board of Review	Top Ten Films		Won
National Board of Review	Best Supporting Actor	Thomas Haden Church	Won
National Board of Review	Best Adapted Screenplay	Alexander Payne and Jim Taylor	Won
National Society of Film Critics Awards	Best Film		2nd Place
National Society of Film Critics Awards	Best Director	Alexander Payne	2nd Place
National Society of Film Critics Awards	Best Actor	Paul Giamatti	2nd Place
National Society of Film Critics Awards	Best Supporting Actor	Thomas Haden Church	Won
National Society of Film Critics Awards	Best Supporting Actress	Virginia Madsen	Won
National Society of Film Critics Awards	Best Screenplay	Alexander Payne and Jim Taylor	Won
New York Film Critics Circle	Best Film		Won
New York Film Critics Circle	Best Actor	Paul Giamatti	Won
New York Film Critics Circle	Best Supporting Actress	Virginia Madsen	Won
New York Film Critics Circle	Best Screenplay	Alexander Payne and Jim Taylor	Won
Online Film Critics Society Awards	Best Picture		Nominated
Online Film Critics Society Awards	Best Director	Alexander Payne	Nominated
Online Film Critics Society Awards	Best Actor	Paul Giamatti	Won
Online Film Critics Society Awards	Best Supporting Actor	Thomas Haden Church	Won
Online Film Critics Society Awards	Best Supporting Actress	Virginia Madsen	Nominated
Online Film Critics Society Awards	Best Adapted Screenplay	Alexander Payne and Jim Taylor	Won
Producers Guild of America Awards	Darryl F. Zanuck Award for Best Theatrical Motion Picture	Michael London	Nominated
San Diego Film Critics Society Awards	Best Adapted Screenplay	Alexander Payne and Jim Taylor	Won
San Francisco Film Critics Circle Awards	Best Film		Won
San Francisco Film Critics Circle Awards	Best Director	Alexander Payne	Won
San Francisco Film Critics Circle Awards	Best Actor	Paul Giamatti	Won
San Francisco Film Critics Circle Awards	Best Supporting Actor	Thomas Haden Church	Won
San Francisco Film Critics Circle Awards	Best Supporting Actress	Virginia Madsen	Won
Satellite Awards	Best Film – Musical or Comedy		Won
Satellite Awards	Best Director – Motion Picture	Alexander Payne	Nominated
Satellite Awards	Best Actor in a Motion Picture – Musical or Comedy	Paul Giamatti	Nominated
Satellite Awards	Best Supporting Actor in a Motion Picture – Musical or Comedy	Thomas Haden Church	Won
Satellite Awards	Best Supporting Actress – Motion Picture Musical or Comedy	Virginia Madsen	Nominated
Satellite Awards	Best Cast – Motion Picture	Thomas Haden Church, Paul Giamatti, Virginia Madsen, and Sandra Oh	Won
Satellite Awards	Best Adapted Screenplay	Alexander Payne and Jim Taylor	Nominated
Screen Actors Guild Awards	Outstanding Performance by a Cast in a Motion Picture	Thomas Haden Church, Paul Giamatti, Virginia Madsen, and Sandra Oh	Won
Screen Actors Guild Awards	Outstanding Performance by a Male Actor in a Leading Role	Paul Giamatti	Nominated
Screen Actors Guild Awards	Outstanding Performance by a Male Actor in a Supporting Role	Thomas Haden Church	Nominated
Screen Actors Guild Awards	Outstanding Performance by a Female Actor in a Supporting Role	Virginia Madsen	Nominated
Toronto Film Critics Association Awards	Best Film		Won
Toronto Film Critics Association Awards	Best Actor	Paul Giamatti	Won
Toronto Film Critics Association Awards	Best Supporting Actress	Virginia Madsen	Won
USC Scripter Award	Best Screenplay	Alexander Payne and Jim Taylor	Nominated
Vancouver Film Critics Circle	Best Film		Won
Vancouver Film Critics Circle	Best Director	Alexander Payne	Nominated
Vancouver Film Critics Circle	Best Actor	Paul Giamatti	Nominated
Vancouver Film Critics Circle	Best Supporting Actor	Thomas Haden Church	Nominated
Vancouver Film Critics Circle	Best Supporting Actress	Virginia Madsen	Won
Washington D.C. Area Film Critics Association Awards	Best Supporting Actor	Thomas Haden Church	Nominated
Washington D.C. Area Film Critics Association Awards	Best Supporting Actress	Virginia Madsen	Nominated
Washington D.C. Area Film Critics Association Awards	Best Adapted Screenplay		Won
Writers Guild of America Awards	Best Adapted Screenplay	Alexander Payne and Jim Taylor	Won

== Remake ==
Fox International Productions and Fuji Television released a Japanese-language remake of the film in October 2009, also titled Sideways (サイドウェイズ, Saidoweizu). The film is directed by Cellin Gluck and stars Katsuhisa Namase, Fumiyo Kohinata, Kyōka Suzuki, and Rinko Kikuchi, and has a soundtrack composed and performed by Hawaiian-born ukulele virtuoso Jake Shimabukuro.

The remake shifts the setting of the film to Napa Valley. Although listed as an executive producer, Payne was not involved with the remake, although he gave it his blessing. Giamatti declined an invitation to make an unspecified cameo appearance in the film.

== Possible sequel ==
Pickett has written three sequel books to Sideways, the second of which being Vertical (2010) which follows Miles and Jack on a road trip to Oregon with Miles' mother. Fox Searchlight retains the film rights to the characters, but Payne has expressed disinterest in directing a sequel to Sideways, and no further adaptations have been made.

The 2025 parody film The Napa Boys posits itself as a fictionalized spinoff of / sequel to Sideways, with the conceit that the film spawned a long-running franchise of lowbrow direct-to-DVD sequels akin to the American Pie films. Armen Weitzman and Nick Corirossi star as the ostensible sons of Miles and Jack.

== See also ==
- List of American films of 2004
- List of media set in San Diego
- Second weekend in box office performance § Second-weekend increase
