= Jim Taylor (writer) =

American screenwriter (born 1962)

- Born: 1962 (age 63–64); Seattle, Washington, U.S.
- Education: Pomona College ('84)
- Alma mater: NYU (MFA '96)
- Occupations: Screenwriter, producer
- Years active: 1987–present
- Spouse: Tamara Jenkins (m. 2002)
- Children: 1

James Taylor (born 1962) is an American producer and screenwriter who has often collaborated on projects with Alexander Payne. The two are business partners in the Santa Monica based Ad Hominem Enterprises, and are credited as co-writers of six films released between 1996 and 2007: Citizen Ruth (1996), Election (1999), Jurassic Park III (2001, with Peter Buchman), About Schmidt (2002), Sideways (2004), and I Now Pronounce You Chuck and Larry (2007, with Barry Fanaro and Lew Gallo). Taylor's credits as a producer include films such as Cedar Rapids and The Descendants.

== Early years ==
I felt like I was too young, and I didn't have anything to make movies about. So very specifically, I went to Pomona to get a liberal arts education and not do filmmaking, even though I knew that was what I ultimately wanted to do.

— Taylor, in a 2005 interview for Pomona College Magazine

Taylor was born in Seattle, Washington. He graduated from Bellevue High School in neighboring Bellevue, and subsequently from Pomona College, a liberal arts school in California that he attended instead of accepting an offer from the USC School of Cinematic Arts.

== Career ==
Taylor began working for Cannon Films in 1987. After visiting China on an Avery Foundation grant, Taylor returned to L.A. and spent three years working with Ivan Passer; he also worked for Devon Foster, a director at HBO, as Foster's assistant.

Taylor met Payne while working temporary jobs in Los Angeles, eventually moving in with him for financial reasons. While roommates the two wrote short films and started writing Citizen Ruth. After winning money on the game show Wheel of Fortune, Taylor entered Tisch School of the Arts at the age of 30. He and Payne did further rewrites on Citizen Ruth while Taylor was a graduate student; the film got made during his third year there. Taylor received an M.F.A. in Filmmaking from New York University in 1996.

== Awards and nominations ==
Taylor has received numerous awards and nominations (including an Oscar win for co-writing Sideways, two Golden Globe Award wins for co-writing About Schmidt and Sideways, and additional Oscar nominations for co-writing Election and for producing The Descendants); those listed below are for his work on Sideways (all shared with Alexander Payne):

Award	Category	Recipients and nominees	Outcome
77th Academy Awards	Best Adapted Screenplay	(with Alexander Payne)	Won
58th British Academy Film Awards	Best Adapted Screenplay	(with Alexander Payne)	Won
Writers Guild of America Awards 2004	Best Adapted Screenplay	(with Alexander Payne)	Won
Boston Society of Film Critics Awards 2004	Best Screenplay	(with Alexander Payne)	Won
Broadcast Film Critics Association Awards 2004	Best Screenplay	(with Alexander Payne)	Won
Chicago Film Critics Association Awards 2004	Best Adapted Screenplay	(with Alexander Payne)	Won
Florida Film Critics Circle Awards 2004	Best Screenplay	(with Alexander Payne)	Won
62nd Golden Globe Awards	Best Screenplay	(with Alexander Payne)	Won
20th Independent Spirit Awards	Best Screenplay	(with Alexander Payne)	Won
Kansas City Film Critics Circle Awards 2004	Best Adapted Screenplay	(with Alexander Payne)	Won
London Film Critics Circle Awards 2004	Screenwriter of the Year	(with Alexander Payne)	Nominated
Los Angeles Film Critics Association Awards 2004	Best Screenplay	(with Alexander Payne)	Won
National Board of Review Awards 2004	Best Adapted Screenplay	(with Alexander Payne)	Won
National Society of Film Critics Awards 2004	Best Screenplay	(with Alexander Payne)	Won
2004 New York Film Critics Circle Awards	Best Screenplay	(with Alexander Payne)	Won
Online Film Critics Society Awards 2004	Best Adapted Screenplay	(with Alexander Payne)	Won
Phoenix Film Critics Society Awards 2004	Best Adapted Screenplay	(with Alexander Payne)	Won
San Diego Film Critics Society Awards 2004	Best Adapted Screenplay	(with Alexander Payne)	Won
Golden Satellite Awards 2004	Best Adapted Screenplay	(with Alexander Payne)	Nominated
Seattle Film Critics Awards	Best Adapted Screenplay	(with Alexander Payne)	Won
Washington D.C. Area Film Critics Association Awards 2004	Best Adapted Screenplay	(with Alexander Payne)	Won

== Personal life ==
Taylor has been married to fellow screenwriter/director, Tamara Jenkins, since 2002—herself an Academy Award nominee for The Savages (2007). They have one daughter and live in NYC as of 2019. The couple co-wrote the screenplay for the 2018 film, Juliet, Naked (adapted from Nick Hornby's homonymous novel), along with Evgenia Peretz—sister of the film's director, Jesse Peretz.
