= List of accolades received by Ray (film) =

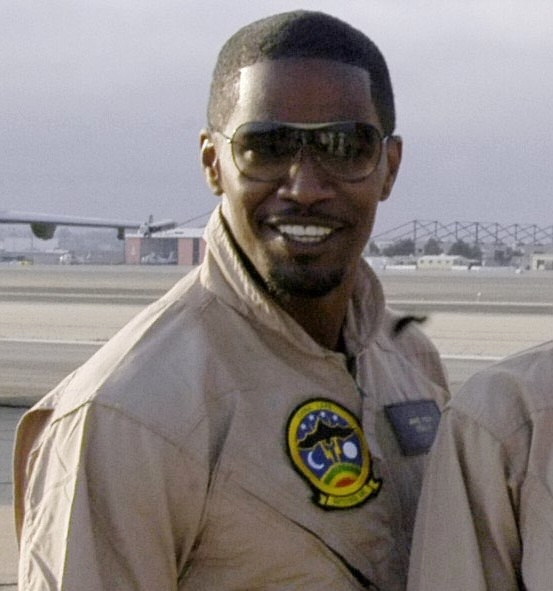
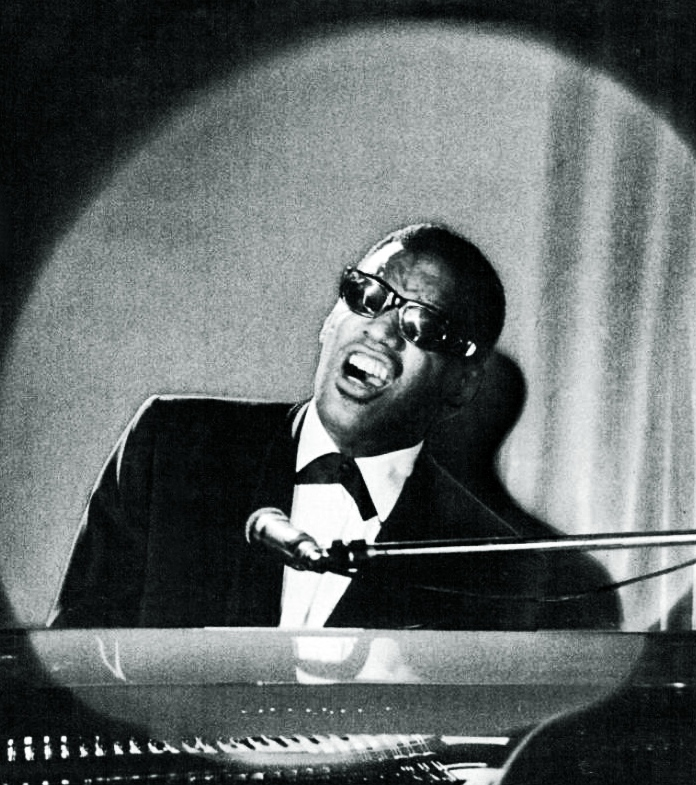
- Jamie Foxx (left) received critical acclaim for his performance as Ray Charles (right).
Awards and nominations
Award	Wins	Nominations

Totals (Note: Certain award groups do not simply award one winner. They acknowledge several different recipients, have runners-up, and have third place. Since this is a specific recognition and is different from losing an award, runner-up mentions are considered wins in this award tally. For simplification and to avoid errors, each award in this list has been presumed to have had a prior nomination.)
- Wins: 53
- Nominations: 108

This is a list of awards and nominations received by the 2004 film Ray. Jamie Foxx was nominated for the Academy Award for Best Actor for this film and the Academy Award for Best Supporting Actor for his performance in Collateral. He is the third actor to have been nominated in both categories in the same year, after Barry Fitzgerald and Al Pacino. Like Fitzgerald and Pacino, he won one of the two Oscars.

== Awards ==
=== Won ===
- 77th Academy Awards:
  - Best Actor (Jamie Foxx)
  - Best Sound Mixing (Scott Millan, Greg Orloff, Bob Beemer and Steve Cantamessa)
- American Cinema Editors: Best Edited Feature Film – Comedy or Musical (Paul Hirsch)
- 58th BAFTA Awards:
  - Best Actor (Jamie Foxx)
  - Best Sound (Scott Millan, Greg Orloff, Bob Beemer and Steve Cantamessa)
- Black Reel Awards: Best Film – Drama, Best Actor – Drama (Jamie Foxx), Best Supporting Actress (Sharon Warren), Best Breakthrough Performance (Sharon Warren), Best Screenplay (James L. White), Best Original Score (Ray Charles and Stephen Altman)
- Boston Society of Film Critics: Best Actor (Jamie Foxx), Best Supporting Actress (Sharon Warren)
- Broadcast Film Critics Association: Best Actor (Jamie Foxx), Best Soundtrack
- Florida Film Critics Circle: Best Actor (Jamie Foxx)
- 62nd Golden Globe Awards:
  - Best Actor – Comedy or Musical (Jamie Foxx)
- Grammy Awards:
  - Best Compilation Soundtrack Album for Motion Picture, Television or Other Visual Media (Ray Charles)
  - Best Score Soundtrack Album for Motion Picture, Television or Other Visual Media (Craig Armstrong)
- Image Awards: Outstanding Motion Picture, Outstanding Actor in a Motion Picture (Jamie Foxx), Outstanding Actress in a Motion Picture (Kerry Washington), Outstanding Supporting Actress in a Motion Picture (Regina King)
- Kansas City Film Critics Circle: Best Actor (Jamie Foxx)
- Las Vegas Film Critics Society: Best Actor (Jamie Foxx)
- London Film Critics Circle: Actor of the Year (Jamie Foxx)
- Motion Picture Sound Editors: Best Sound Editing in Feature Film – Music – Musical (Curt Sobel [music editor])
- National Board of Review: Best Actor (Jamie Foxx)
- National Society of Film Critics: Best Actor (Jamie Foxx)
- Online Film Critics Society: Best Actor (Jamie Foxx), Best Supporting Actress (Sharon Warren)
- Phoenix Film Critics Society: Best Actor (Jamie Foxx), Best Use of Previously Published or Recorded Music
- PRISM Awards: Performance in a Feature Film (Jamie Foxx)
- Satellite Awards: Best Actor in a Motion Picture – Comedy or Musical (Jamie Foxx), Best Actress in a Supporting Role – Comedy or Musical (Regina King), Best Screenplay – Original (James L. White)
- Screen Actors Guild: Outstanding Performance by a Male Actor in a Leading Role (Jamie Foxx)
- Seattle Film Critics: Best Actor (Jamie Foxx)
- Southeastern Film Critics Association: Best Actor (Jamie Foxx)
- Vancouver Film Critics Circle: Best Actor (Jamie Foxx)

=== Nominations ===
- 77th Academy Awards:
  - Best Picture (Taylor Hackford, Stuart Benjamin, and Howard Baldwin)
  - Best Director (Taylor Hackford)
  - Best Costume Design (Sharen Davis)
  - Best Film Editing (Paul Hirsch)
- American Society of Cinematographers: Outstanding Achievement in Cinematography in Theatrical Releases (Paweł Edelman)
- 58th BAFTA Awards:
  - Best Screenplay – Original (James L. White)
  - Anthony Asquith Award for Film Music (Craig Armstrong)
- Black Reel Awards: Best Actress – Drama (Regina King), Best Actress – Drama (Kerry Washington), Best Supporting Actor (Clifton Powell), Best Breakthrough Performance (C. J. Sanders)
- Broadcast Film Critics Association: Best Picture, Best Director (Taylor Hackford)
- Casting Society of America: Best Feature Film Casting – Drama (Nancy Klopper and Mark Fincannon [location casting])
- Cinema Audio Society: Outstanding Achievement in Sound Mixing for Motion Pictures (Steve Cantamessa, Scott Millan, Greg Orloff and Bob Beemer)
- Costume Designers Guild: Excellence in Period/Fantasy Film (Sharen Davis)
- David di Donatello Awards (Italy): Best Foreign Film
- Directors Guild of America: Outstanding Directorial Achievement in Motion Pictures (Taylor Hackford)
- 62nd Golden Globe Awards:
  - Best Picture – Comedy or Musical
- Golden Trailer Awards: Best Drama
- Image Awards: Outstanding Supporting Actor in a Motion Picture (Clifton Powell), Outstanding Supporting Actor in a Motion Picture (C.J. Sanders), Outstanding Supporting Actress in a Motion Picture (Sharon Warren)
- MTV Movie Awards: Best Movie, Best Male Performance (Jamie Foxx)
- Motion Picture Sound Editors: Best Sound Editing in Dialog, Efx
- Online Film Critics Society: Best Actor (Jamie Foxx), Best Supporting Actress (Sharon Warren)
- Satellite Awards: Best Picture – Comedy or Musical, Best Actress in a Motion Picture – Comedy or Musical (Kerry Washington), Best Actress in a Supporting Role – Comedy or Musical (Sharon Warren), Best Director (Taylor Hackfor)
- Screen Actors Guild: Outstanding Performance by a Cast in a Motion Picture (Aunjanue Ellis, Jamie Foxx, Terrence Howard, Regina King, Harry J. Lennix, Clifton Powell, Larenz Tate, Kerry Washington)
- Teen Choice Awards: Choice Movie Actor – Drama (Jamie Foxx), Choice Movie Actress – Drama (Kerry Washington)
- Young Artist Awards: Best Performance in a Feature Film – Supporting Young Actor (C.J. Sanders)

=== American Film Institute ===
- AFI's 100 Years...100 Cheers - #99
