= 58th British Academy Film Awards =

2005 film awards ceremony

- Date: 12 February 2005
- Site: Odeon Leicester Square, London
- Hosted by: Stephen Fry

Highlights
- Best Film: The Aviator
- Best British Film: My Summer of Love
- Best Actor: Jamie Foxx; Ray
- Best Actress: Imelda Staunton; Vera Drake
- Most awards: The Aviator (4)
- Most nominations: The Aviator (14)

The 58th British Academy Film Awards, more commonly known as the BAFTAs, took place on 12 February 2005 at the Odeon Leicester Square in London, honouring the best national and foreign films of 2004. Presented by the British Academy of Film and Television Arts, accolades were handed out for the best feature-length film and documentaries of any nationality that were screened at British cinemas in 2004.

The nominees were announced on 18 January 2005. The Aviator won Best Film, Best Supporting Actress for Cate Blanchett, Best Production Design, and Best Makeup and Hair. Jamie Foxx and Imelda Staunton won Best Actor and Best Actress for Ray and Vera Drake, respectively. Vera Drake also won Best Director for Mike Leigh and Best Costume Design. My Summer of Love, directed by Paweł Pawlikowski, was voted Outstanding British Film of 2004.

Stephen Fry hosted the ceremony for the fourth consecutive year.

== Winners and nominees ==
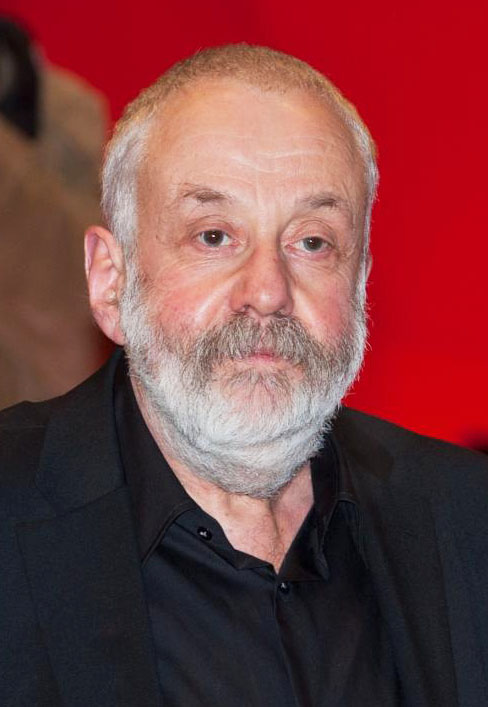
Mike Leigh, Best Director winner

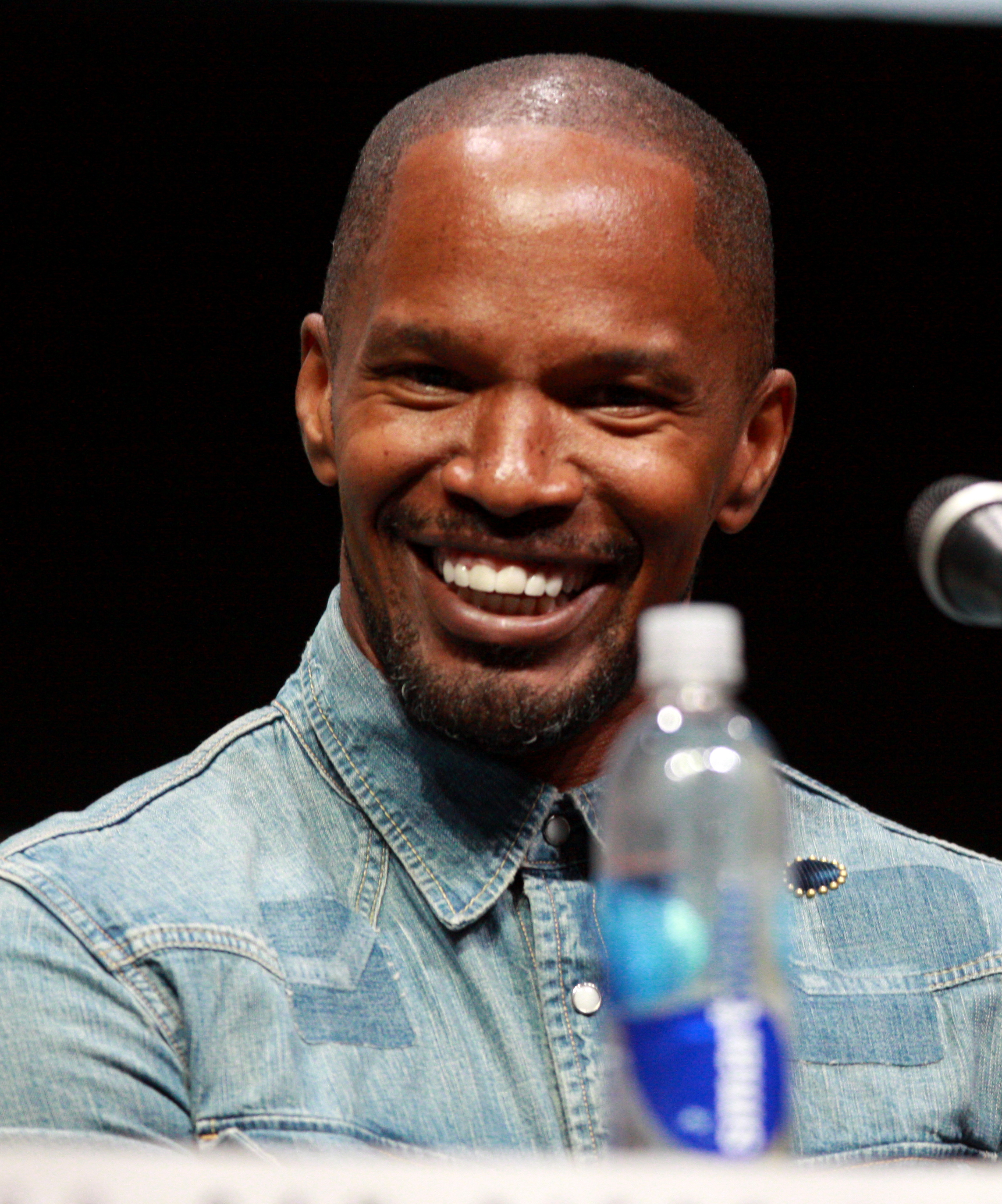
Jamie Foxx, Best Actor winner

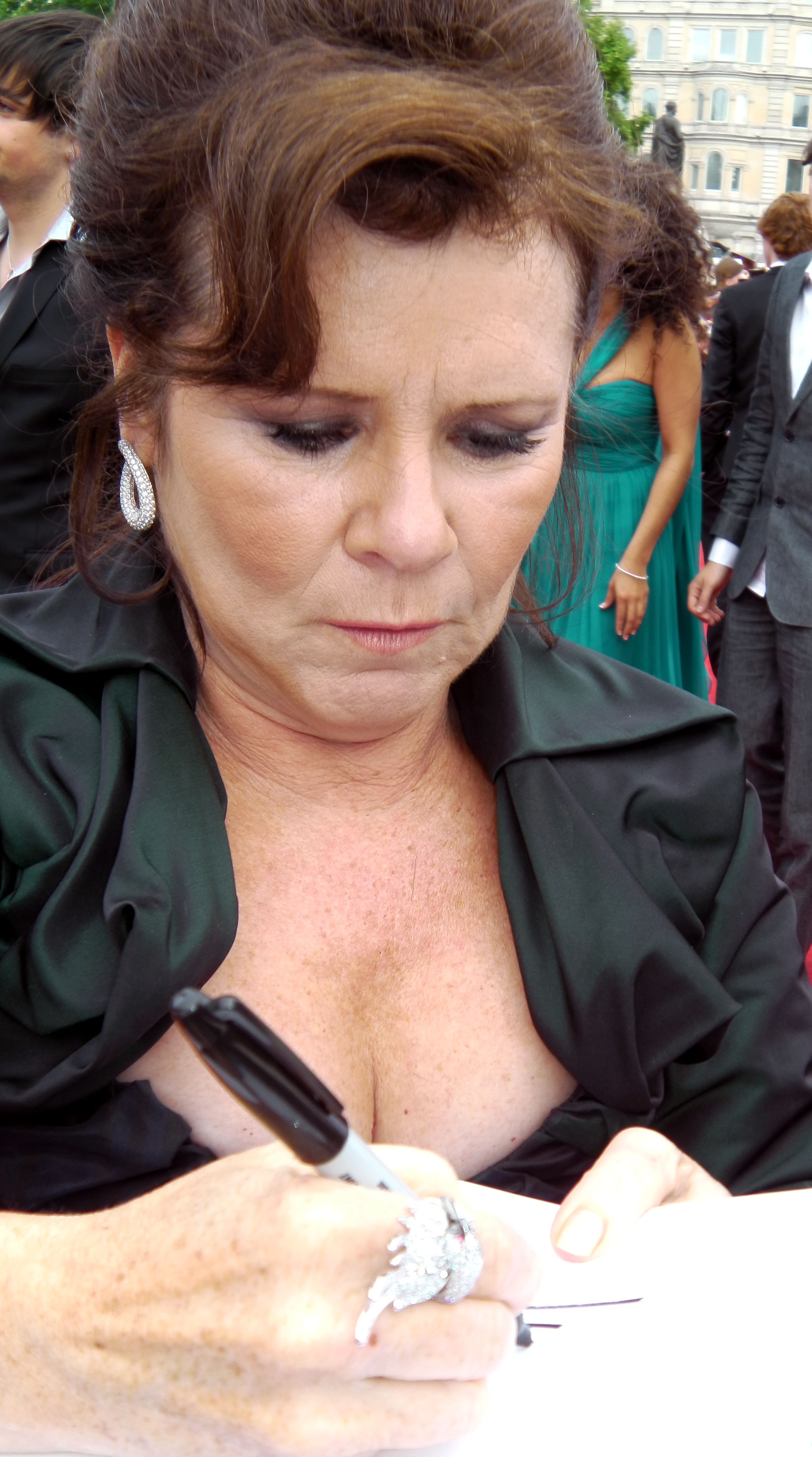
Imelda Staunton, Best Actress winner

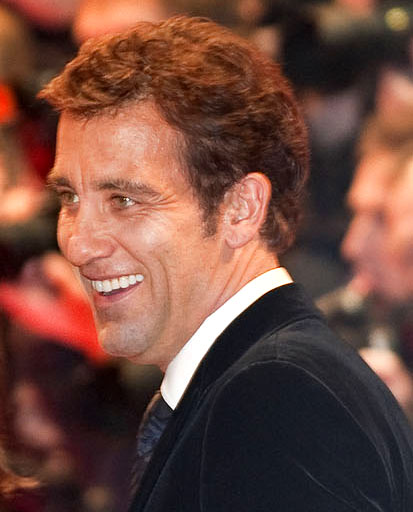
Clive Owen, Best Supporting Actor winner

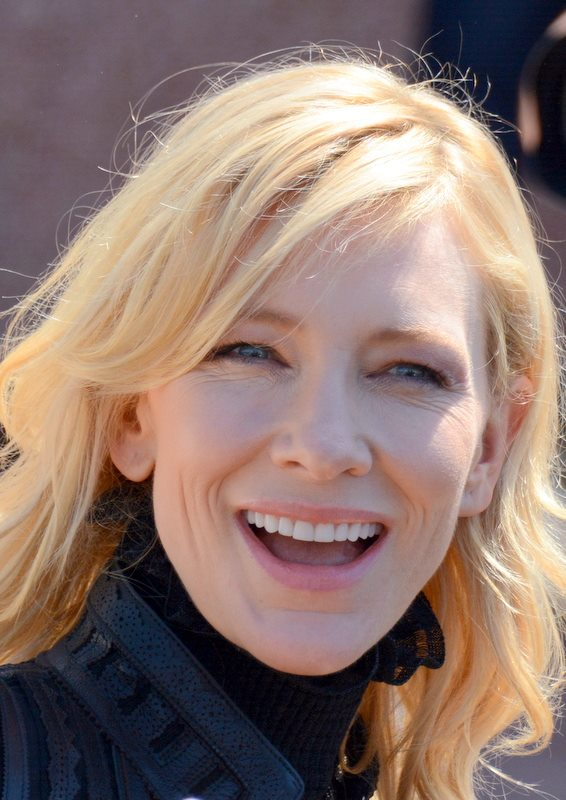
Cate Blanchett, Best Supporting Actress winner

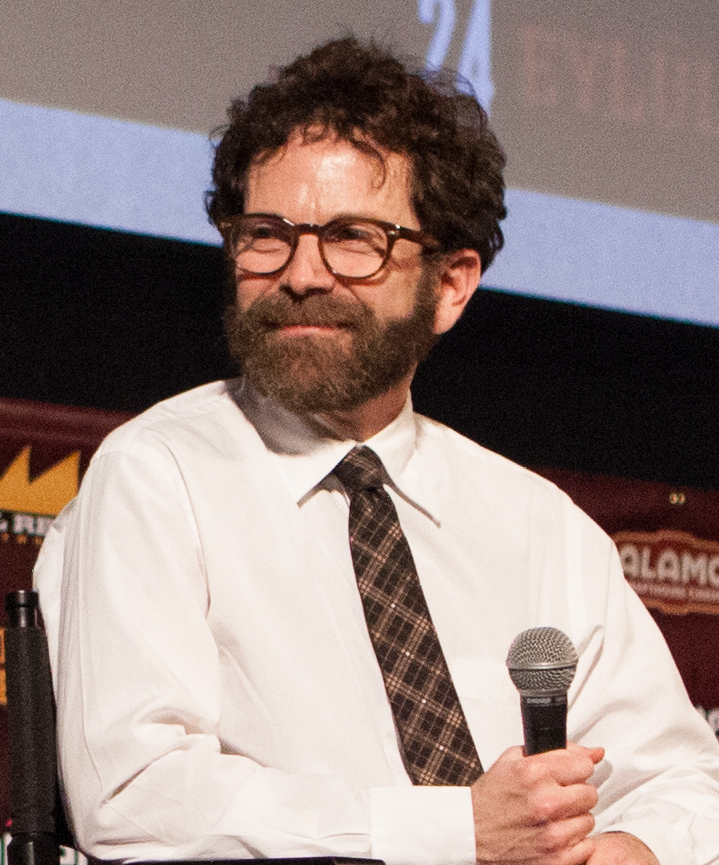
Charlie Kaufman, Best Original Screenplay winner

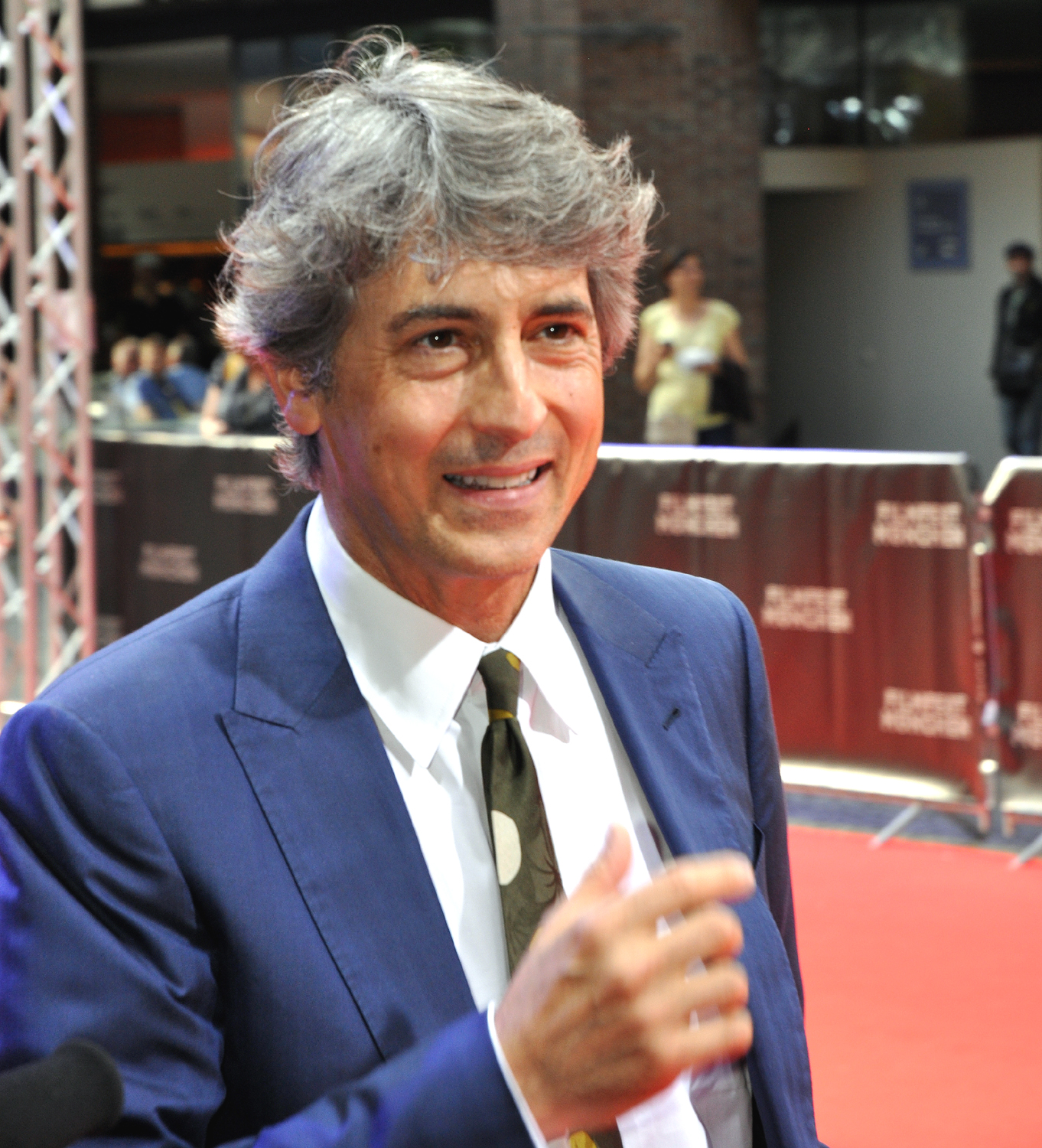
Alexander Payne, Best Adapted Screenplay co-winner

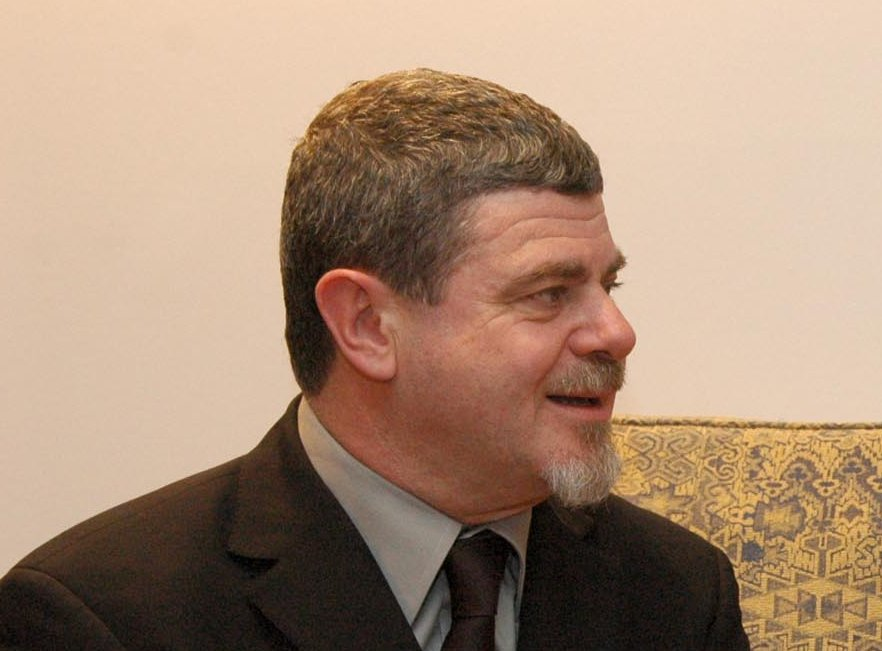
Gustavo Santaolalla, Best Original Score winner

=== BAFTA Fellowship ===
- **John Barry**

=== Outstanding British Contribution to Cinema ===
- **Angela Allen**

=== Awards ===
Winners are listed first and highlighted in boldface.

| **Best Film**: **The Aviator – Michael Mann, Sandy Climan, Graham King and Charles Evans Jr.**; Eternal Sunshine of the Spotless Mind – Steve Golin and Anthony Bregman; Finding Neverland – Richard N. Gladstein and Nellie Bellflower; The Motorcycle Diaries – Michael Nozik, Edgard Tenenbaum and Karen Tenkhoff; Vera Drake – Simon Channing Williams and Alain Sarde | **Best Direction**: **Mike Leigh – Vera Drake**; Marc Forster – Finding Neverland; Michel Gondry – Eternal Sunshine of the Spotless Mind; Michael Mann – Collateral; Martin Scorsese – The Aviator |
| **Best Actor in a Leading Role**: **Jamie Foxx – Ray as Ray Charles**; Jim Carrey – Eternal Sunshine of the Spotless Mind as Joel Barish; Johnny Depp – Finding Neverland as J. M. Barrie; Leonardo DiCaprio – The Aviator as Howard Hughes; Gael García Bernal – The Motorcycle Diaries as Che Guevara | **Best Actress in a Leading Role**: **Imelda Staunton – Vera Drake as Vera Drake**; Charlize Theron – Monster as Aileen Wuornos; Kate Winslet – Eternal Sunshine of the Spotless Mind as Clementine Kruczynski; Kate Winslet – Finding Neverland as Sylvia Llewelyn Davies; Zhang Ziyi – House of Flying Daggers as Mei |
| **Best Actor in a Supporting Role**: **Clive Owen – Closer as Larry Gray**; Alan Alda – The Aviator as Owen Brewster; Phil Davis – Vera Drake as Stanley Drake; Rodrigo de la Serna – The Motorcycle Diaries as Alberto Granado; Jamie Foxx – Collateral as Max Durocher | **Best Actress in a Supporting Role**: **Cate Blanchett – The Aviator as Katharine Hepburn**; Julie Christie – Finding Neverland as Emma du Maurier; Heather Craney – Vera Drake as Joyce Drake; Natalie Portman – Closer as Alice Ayres / Jane Jones; Meryl Streep – The Manchurian Candidate as Eleanor Prentiss Shaw |
| **Best Original Screenplay**: **Eternal Sunshine of the Spotless Mind – Charlie Kaufman**; The Aviator – John Logan; Collateral – Stuart Beattie; Ray – James L. White; Vera Drake – Mike Leigh | **Best Adapted Screenplay**: **Sideways – Alexander Payne and Jim Taylor**; The Chorus – Christophe Barratier and Philippe Lopes-Curval; Closer – Patrick Marber; Finding Neverland – David Magee; The Motorcycle Diaries – José Rivera |
| **Best Cinematography**: **Collateral – Dion Beebe and Paul Cameron**; The Aviator – Robert Richardson; Finding Neverland – Roberto Schaefer; House of Flying Daggers – Zhao Xiaoding; The Motorcycle Diaries – Éric Gautier | **Best Costume Design**: **Vera Drake – Jacqueline Durran**; The Aviator – Sandy Powell; Finding Neverland – Alexandra Byrne; House of Flying Daggers – Emi Wada; The Merchant of Venice – Sammy Sheldon |
| **Best Editing**: **Eternal Sunshine of the Spotless Mind – Valdís Óskarsdóttir**; The Aviator – Thelma Schoonmaker; Collateral – Jim Miller and Paul Rubell; House of Flying Daggers – Long Cheng; Vera Drake – Jim Clark | **Best Makeup and Hair**: **The Aviator – Morag Ross, Kathryn Blondell and Siân Grigg**; Finding Neverland – Christine Blundell; Harry Potter and the Prisoner of Azkaban – Amanda Knight, Eithn Fennell and Nick Dudman; House of Flying Daggers – Kwan Lee-Na, Yang Xiaohai and Chau Siu-Mui; Vera Drake – Christine Blundell |
| **Best Original Music**: **The Motorcycle Diaries – Gustavo Santaolalla**; The Aviator – Howard Shore; The Chorus – Bruno Coulais; Finding Neverland – Jan A. P. Kaczmarek; Ray – Craig Armstrong | **Best Production Design**: **The Aviator – Dante Ferretti**; Finding Neverland – Gemma Jackson; Harry Potter and the Prisoner of Azkaban – Stuart Craig; House of Flying Daggers – Huo Tingxiao; Vera Drake – Eve Stewart |
| **Best Sound**: **Ray – Steve Cantamessa, Scott Millan, Greg Orloff and Bob Beemer**; The Aviator – Philip Stockton, Eugene Gearty, Petur Hliddal and Tom Fleischman; Collateral – Elliott Koretz, Lee Orloff, Michael Minkler and Myron Nettinga; House of Flying Daggers – Tao Jing and Roger Savage; Spider-Man 2 – Paul N. J. Ottosson, Kevin O'Connell, Greg P. Russell and Jeffrey J. Haboush | **Best Special Visual Effects**: **The Day After Tomorrow – Karen Goulekas, Neil Corbould, Greg Strause and Remo Balcells**; The Aviator – Robert Legato, Pete Travers, Matthew Gratzner and Bruce Steinheimer; Harry Potter and the Prisoner of Azkaban – John Richardson, Roger Guyett, Tim Burke, Bill George and Karl Mooney; House of Flying Daggers – Angie Lam, Andy Brown, Kirsty Millar and Luke Hetherington; Spider-Man 2 – John Dykstra, Scott Stokdyk, Anthony LaMolinara and John Frazier |
| **Outstanding British Film**: **My Summer of Love – Tanya Seghatchian, Christopher Collins and Paweł Pawlikowski**; Dead Man's Shoes – Mark Herbert and Shane Meadows; Harry Potter and the Prisoner of Azkaban – David Heyman, Chris Columbus, Mark Radcliffe and Alfonso Cuarón; Shaun of the Dead – Nira Park and Edgar Wright; Vera Drake – Simon Channing Williams, Alain Sarde and Mike Leigh | **Outstanding Debut by a British Writer, Director or Producer**: **A Way of Life – Amma Asante (Writer/Director)**; AfterLife – Andrea Gibb (Writer); Dear Frankie – Shona Auerbach (Director); Layer Cake – Matthew Vaughn (Director); Shaun of the Dead – Nira Park (Producer) |
| **Best Short Animation**: **Birthday Boy – Andrew Gregory and Park Se-jong**; City Paradise – Erika Forzy and Gaelle Denis; Heavy Pockets – Jane Robertson and Sarah Cox; His Passionate Bride – Sylvie Bringas and Monika Forsberg; Little Things – Daniel Greaves | **Best Short Film**: **The Banker – Kelly Broad and Hattie Dalton**; Can't Stop Breathing – Ravinder Basra and Amy Neil; Elephant Boy – Rene Mohandas and Durdana Shaikh; Knitting a Love Song – Debbie Ballin and Annie Watson; Six Shooter – Mia Bays, Kenton Allen and Martin McDonagh |
**Best Film Not in the English Language**: **The Motorcycle Diaries – Michael Nozik, Edgard Tenenbaum, Karen Tenkhoff and Walter Salles**; Bad Education – Agustín Almodóvar and Pedro Almodóvar; The Chorus – Arthur Cohn, Nicolas Mauvernay, Jacques Perrin and Christophe Barratier; House of Flying Daggers – William Kong and Zhang Yimou; A Very Long Engagement – Francis Boespflug and Jean-Pierre Jeunet

== Statistics ==
Films that received multiple nominations
| Nominations | Film |
|---|---|
| 14 | The Aviator |
| 11 | Finding Neverland |
| 11 | Vera Drake |
| 9 | House of Flying Daggers |
| 7 | The Motorcycle Diaries |
| 6 | Collateral |
| 6 | Eternal Sunshine of the Spotless Mind |
| 4 | Harry Potter and the Prisoner of Azkaban |
| 4 | Ray |
| 3 | The Chorus |
| 3 | Closer |
| 2 | Shaun of the Dead |
| 2 | Spider-Man 2 |

Films that received multiple awards
| Awards | Film |
|---|---|
| 4 | The Aviator |
| 3 | Vera Drake |
| 2 | Eternal Sunshine of the Spotless Mind |
| 2 | The Motorcycle Diaries |
| 2 | Ray |

== See also ==
- 77th Academy Awards
- 30th César Awards
- 10th Critics' Choice Awards
- 57th Directors Guild of America Awards
- 18th European Film Awards
- 62nd Golden Globe Awards
- 25th Golden Raspberry Awards
- 9th Golden Satellite Awards
- 19th Goya Awards
- 20th Independent Spirit Awards
- 10th Lumière Awards
- 16th Producers Guild of America Awards
- 31st Saturn Awards
- 11th Screen Actors Guild Awards
- 57th Writers Guild of America Awards
