= Ckay1 =

American musician

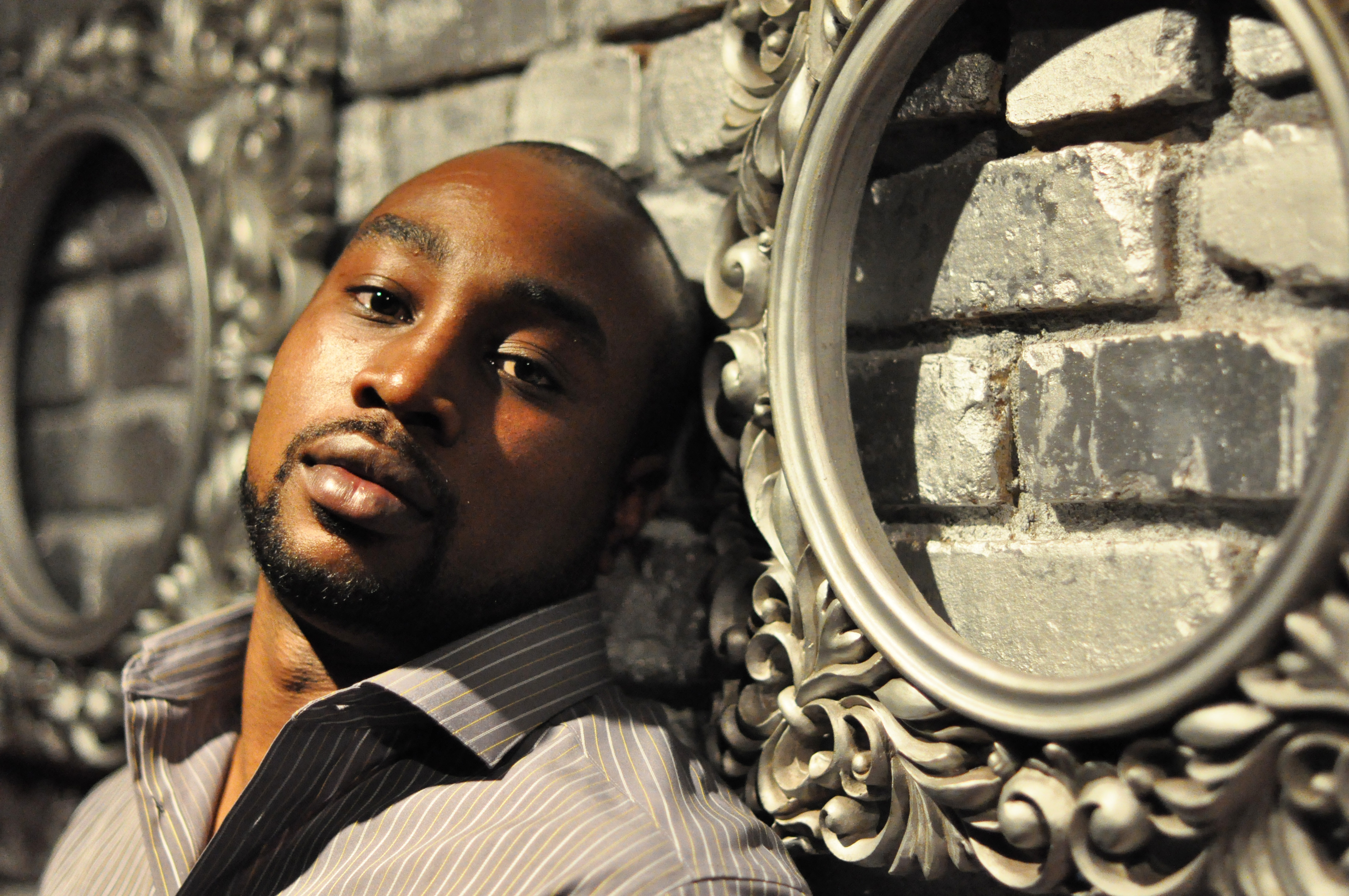
- Marshall in 2010

Background information
- Also known as: Chris "Ckay1" Marshall
- Born: Christchankeith Marshall; May 20, 1982 (age 44)
- Origin: Charleston, South Carolina
- Genres: Hip hop, R&B, Pop, Rock
- Occupations: Musician, producer, arranger, composer,
- Instruments: Violin, bass guitar, vocals, keyboard, synthesizer
- Years active: 2006 – present
- Website: www.ckay1.com

Christchankeith "Ckay1" Marshall is an American music composer, arranger, and producer. Marshall's first full credit production work was in 2006 on Light Poles and Pine Trees for Hip hop group Field Mob. This release reached No. 7 on the US Billboard 200 and No. 2 on Top R&B/Hip Hop Albums

== Early life ==
Born and raised in Nigeria, Marshall began his music career at an early age. By the age of 11, he had become a familiar face throughout the acting community. He has played numerous onstage roles at the historical Dock Street Theatre and The Charleston Youth Company. In middle school, Marshall began playing the violin, and upon entering Academic Magnet High School, he began playing the bass guitar, where he became a brief member of a local band that performed in the Tri-State area.

== Education ==
Upon high school graduation, Marshall received a full academic scholarship to Florida A&M University in Tallahassee, Florida. He was a member of the Hatchett Pre-law Society, The National Society of Collegiate Scholars, Phi Alpha Delta, and Alpha Phi Alpha fraternity. Marshall graduated magna cum laude from FAMU in 2004 with his B.A in political science with a minor in Spanish.

== Career ==
While in Tallahassee, Florida, Marshall produced music for a wide variety of local and independent artists including, but not limited to "Thrill Da Playa" of the 69 Boyz. However, it was not until his independent release of the Gold Album (a mashup album created by coupling an a cappella version of rapper Jay-Z's The Black Album with instrumentals created from a variety of unauthorized samples) that he garnered the attention of Shawn Jay and Smoke of Field Mob, of whom had recently signed a deal with DTP Records, Geffen Records. Their relationship led to his first major released production credit with 'Area Code 229' with the 2006 release of Light Poles and Pine Trees. He won two Emmy's for his role in the creation of music composition for the 2020 NBA season and the 2023 world film festival for best indie short film. As of 2008, he resided in Atlanta, Georgia. He currently resides in Los Angeles, California, and is represented by the firm Mark Music & Media Law located in Beverly Hills, California. Marshall is also the owner and founder of N.O.T.E Productions, L.L.C, a music production company serving the music and film industries.

== Discography and credits ==
Year	Album	Song	Artist	Credit
2006	Light Poles and Pine Trees	"Area Code 229"	Field Mob	Composer, producer, drum programming
2011	The One	"Cold"	Encore	Composer, producer
