= Sick of Being Lonely =

2002 single by Field Mob

Single by Field Mob

from the album From tha Roota to tha Toota
- B-side: "Betty Rocker", "It's Hell"
- Released: August 13, 2002
- Recorded: 2001
- Genre: Hip-hop; R&B
- Length: 3:47
- Label: MCA
- Songwriter: Field Mob
- Producer: Phalon Alexander

Field Mob singles chronology
"Cut Loose" (2001)	"Sick of Being Lonely" (2002)	"Haters" (2002)

Music video
- "Sick of Being Lonely" on YouTube

"Sick of Being Lonely" is a song written and performed by American hip-hop group Field Mob featuring Torica. It was issued as the official lead single from their second studio album From tha Roota to tha Toota. It was the group's first entry on the Billboard Hot 100, peaking at #18 in 2002.

== Music video ==
The official music video for "Sick of Being Lonely" was directed by Jeremy Rall. In addition to featuring chorus singer Torica, comedian John Witherspoon and the song's producer Jazze Pha also appear.

== Chart positions ==
=== Weekly charts ===
Chart (2002)	Peak position
US Billboard Hot 100	18
US Hot Rap Tracks (Billboard)	5
US Hot R&B/Hip-Hop Singles & Tracks (Billboard)	10
US Rhythmic Top 40 (Billboard)	10
US Top 40 Mainstream (Billboard)	24
US Top 40 Tracks (Billboard)	32

=== Year-end charts ===
Chart (2003)	Position
US Billboard Hot 100	93
