= 613: Ashy to Classy =

Studio album by Field Mob
- Released: December 12, 2000
- Genre: Hip-hop
- Label: MCA
- Producer: Amin (Pop) Miller; Ole-e

Field Mob chronology
613: Ashy to Classy (2000)	From tha Roota to tha Toota (2002)

Singles from 613: Ashy to Classy
- 1. "Project Dreams" Released: 2000

Professional ratings
Review scores
Source	Rating
AllMusic	4/5 stars
HipHopDX	3/5
Vibe	3.5/5 stars

613: Ashy to Classy is the first album by the American hip-hop duo Field Mob, released on December 12, 2000, by MCA Records. Supported by the only single, "Project Dreamz", it peaked at No. 194 on the Billboard 200 and No. 35 on the Top R&B/Hip Hop Albums charts.

== Critical reception ==
Exclaim! wrote that "it's evident they've been influenced by the early work of Dungeon Family stalwarts Goodie Mob and OutKast as much as they have been by the usual Southern bounce, and that there's a little more to them than meets the eye." CMJ New Music Monthly praised the "muddy gothic rumble of their minimal backing tracks."

== Track listing ==
No.	Title	Length
1.	"Ashy to Classy (Intro)"	1:42
2.	"Can't Stop Us"	5:10
3.	"Project Dreamz"	5:18
4.	"Dead in Your Chevy"	3:50
5.	"Da' Durty"	4:26
6.	"My Main Roni" (featuring Mr. Keith)	5:13
7.	"Cheatin' on We"	3:59
8.	"Waiting" (Spoken Interlude)	2:29
9.	"Channel 613, Pt. 1"	4:34
10.	"Dimez (Jazzy B's)"	5:26
11.	"Crutch" (featuring Off Glass)	4:59
12.	"Shake Sumpthin'" (featuring Papa Reu)	5:09
13.	"Hey Shawty" (featuring Suthern Klick)	4:39
