= Light Poles and Pine Trees =

Studio album by Field Mob
- Released: June 20, 2006
- Recorded: 2005–2006
- Studio: PatchWerk Recording Studios (Atlanta, GA); Dirty South Studios (Atlanta, GA); Doppler Studios (Atlanta, GA); Upstairs Studio (Atlanta, GA); Chalice Recording Studios (Los Angeles, CA); Vudu Spellz Entertainment
- Genre: Hip hop
- Length: 58:16
- Label: Disturbing tha Peace; Geffen
- Producer: Ckay1; Jazze Pha; Ken Jo; Ole-E; Polow da Don; Vudu

Field Mob chronology
From tha Roota to tha Toota (2002)	Light Poles and Pine Trees (2006)

Singles from Light Poles and Pine Trees
- 1. "My Wheels" Released: June 21, 2005; 2. "Friday Night" Released: August 30, 2005; 3. "Georgia" Released: October 9, 2005; 4. "So What" Released: April 2, 2006 (U.S.)

Professional ratings
Review scores
Source	Rating
AllHipHop	3.5/5 stars
AllMusic	3.5/5 stars
HipHopDX	3/5
IGN	7.9/10
Now	2/5 Ns
RapReviews	7.5/10
Spin	4/5 stars
The Guardian	3/5 stars
XXL	4/5

Light Poles and Pine Trees is the third studio album by American Southern hip hop duo Field Mob. It was released on June 20, 2006 through Disturbing tha Peace and Geffen Records. Recording sessions took place at PatchWerk Recording Studios, Dirty South Studios, Doppler Studios and Upstairs Studio in Atlanta, at Chalice Recording Studios in Los Angeles and at Vudu Spellz Entertainment. Production was handled by Ken Jo, Polow da Don, Ckay1, Jazze Pha, Ole-E and Vudu, with Chaka Zulu, Jeff Dixon and Ludacris serving as executive producers. It features guest appearances from Ludacris, Bobby V, Ciara and Jamie Foxx. The album debuted at number 7 on the Billboard 200 and number 2 on the Top R&B/Hip-Hop Albums with first week sales of 63,000 copies in the United States.

Originally, the premiere single from the album was to be the track "Friday Night" but did not make the final album cut, although it was still released in early 2006 as a radio promo and appeared on international editions as an extra bonus track. Instead the first official single from the album was "So What". This has become the duo's most successful hit to date, climbing to No. 10 on the US Billboard Hot 100 in the US. The song "Georgia" is a reprise, originally appearing on the compilation Disturbing tha Peace.

== Track listing ==
No.	Title	Writer(s)	Producer(s)	Length
1.	"1, 2, 3"	Darion Crawford; Shawn T. Johnson; Kendall Johnson; Premro Smith; Marlon Goodwin	Ken Jo	4:18
2.	"My Wheels"	Crawford; S. Johnson; K. Johnson	Ken Jo	4:11
3.	"So What" (featuring Ciara)	Crawford; S. Johnson; Phalon Alexander; Cedric Allen Williams; Zachary Wallace	Jazze Pha	3:36
4.	"Baby Bend Over" (featuring Polow da Don)	Crawford; S. Johnson; Jamal Jones; Gregory Mays; Darryl Barnes; Tony Romeo	Polow da Don	3:48
5.	"Smilin'" (featuring Ludacris)	Crawford; S. Johnson; Christopher Bridges; Emanuel Anderson; James Brown; Betty Jean Newsome	Ole-E	4:18
6.	"Area Code 229"	Crawford; S. Johnson; Christchankeith Marshall	Ckay1	4:35
7.	"Skit"			1:08
8.	"Blacker the Berry"	Crawford; K. Johnson; Tupac Shakur; Daryl Anderson; Roger Troutman; Stan Vincent	Ken Jo	4:25
9.	"I Hate You"	S. Johnson; K. Johnson; Pharrell Williams; Chad Hugo	Ken Jo	3:43
10.	"At the Park"	Crawford; S. Johnson; Jones	Polow da Don	3:40
11.	"Eat 'Em Up, Beat 'Em Up"	Crawford; S. Johnson; K. Johnson	Ken Jo	4:59
12.	"Pistol Grip"	Crawford; S. Johnson; K. Johnson	Ken Jo	4:14
13.	"Sorry Baby" (featuring Bobby Valentino)	Crawford; S. Johnson; K. Johnson	Ken Jo	3:26
14.	"It's Over" (featuring Tyrese Gibson)	Crawford; S. Johnson; K. Johnson	Ken Jo	3:32
15.	"Georgia" (featuring Ludacris and Jamie Foxx)	Crawford; S. Johnson; Bridges; Matthew McAllister; Hoagy Carmichael; Stuart Gorrell	Vudu	4:23
Total length:				58:16

Europe edition bonus track
No.	Title	Writer(s)	Producer(s)	Length
16.	"Friday Night"	Crawford; S. Johnson; K. Johnson	Ken Jo	3:45

== Charts ==
=== Weekly charts ===
Chart (2006)	Peak position
US Billboard 200	7
US Top R&B/Hip-Hop Albums (Billboard)	2

=== Year-end charts ===
Chart (2006)	Position
US Top R&B/Hip-Hop Albums (Billboard)	97
