= 9th Golden Satellite Awards =

Awards ceremony for film and television

- Date: January 23, 2005

Highlights
- Best drama film: Hotel Rwanda
- Best comedy/musical film: Sideways
- Best television drama: Nip/Tuck
- Best television musical/comedy: Desperate Housewives
- Best director: Mel Gibson for The Passion of the Christ

The 9th Golden Satellite Awards, honoring the best in film and television of 2004, were presented by the International Press Academy on January 23, 2005.

== Special achievement awards ==
Mary Pickford Award (for outstanding contribution to the entertainment industry) – Susan Sarandon

Nikola Tesla Award (for introducing video-assist and video playback techniques, which have become industry standards) – Jerry Lewis

Outstanding New Talent – Freddie Highmore

== Motion picture winners and nominees ==
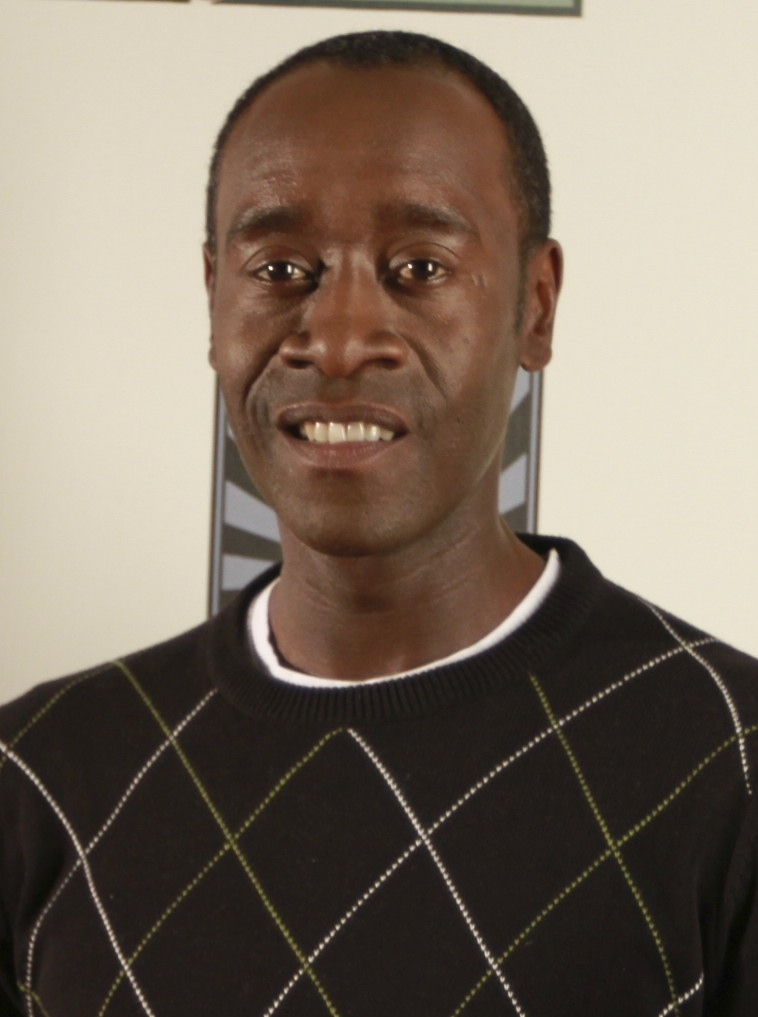
Don Cheadle – Best Actor in a Motion Picture, Drama

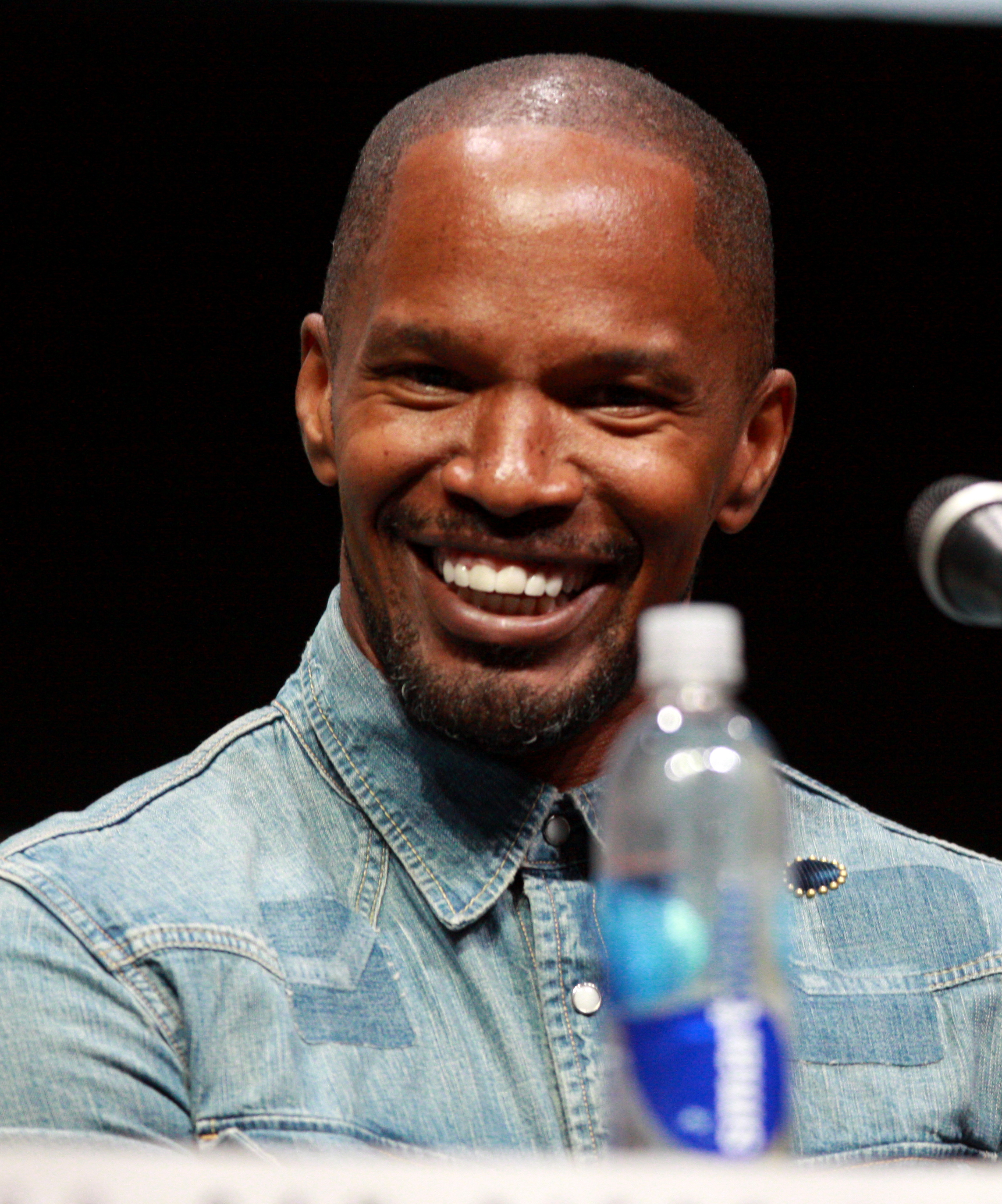
Jamie Foxx – Best Actor in a Motion Picture, Comedy or Musical & Best Actor in a Miniseries or Television Film

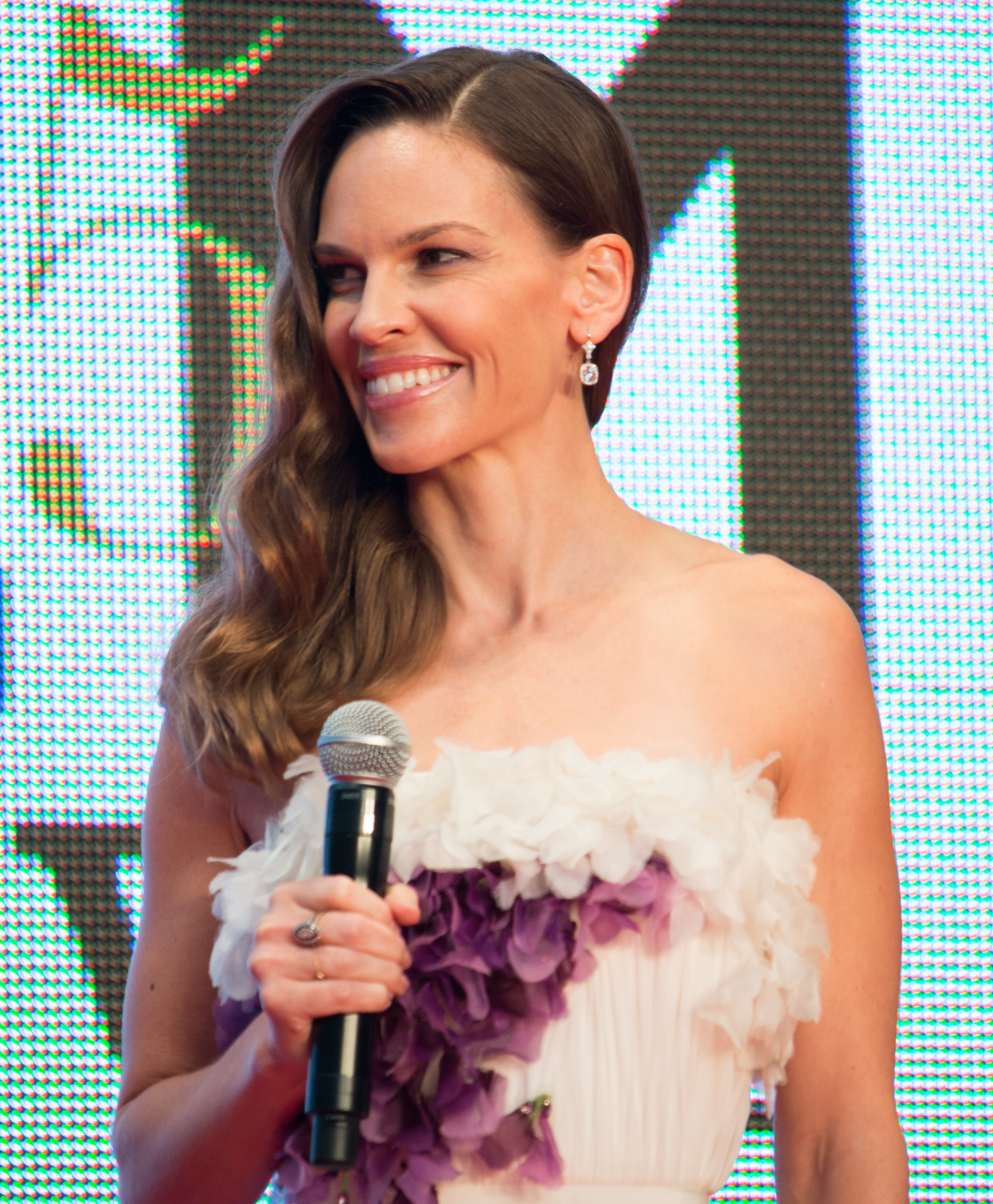
Hilary Swank – Best Actress in a Motion Picture, Drama

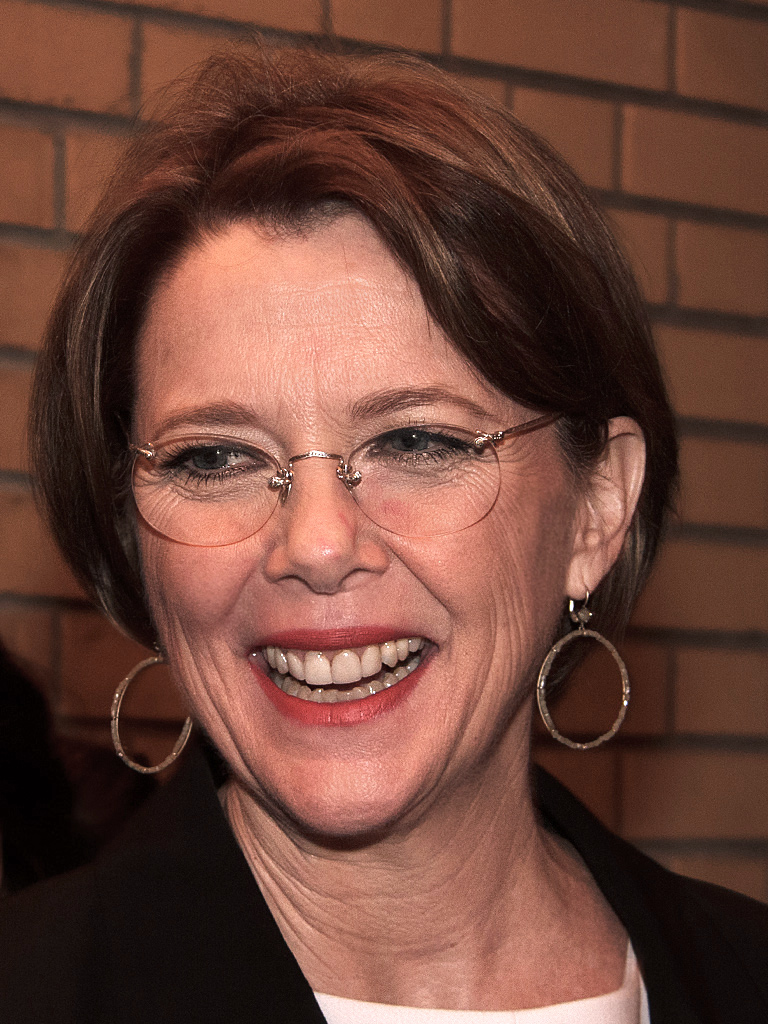
Annette Bening – Best Actress in a Motion Picture – Comedy or Musical

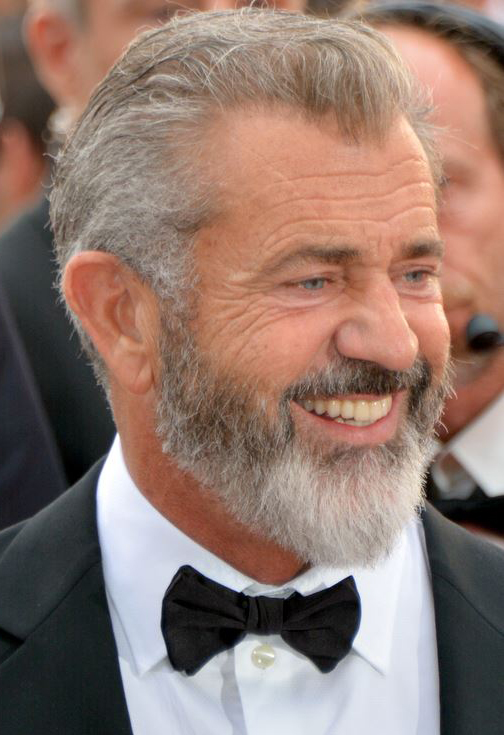
Mel Gibson – Best Director

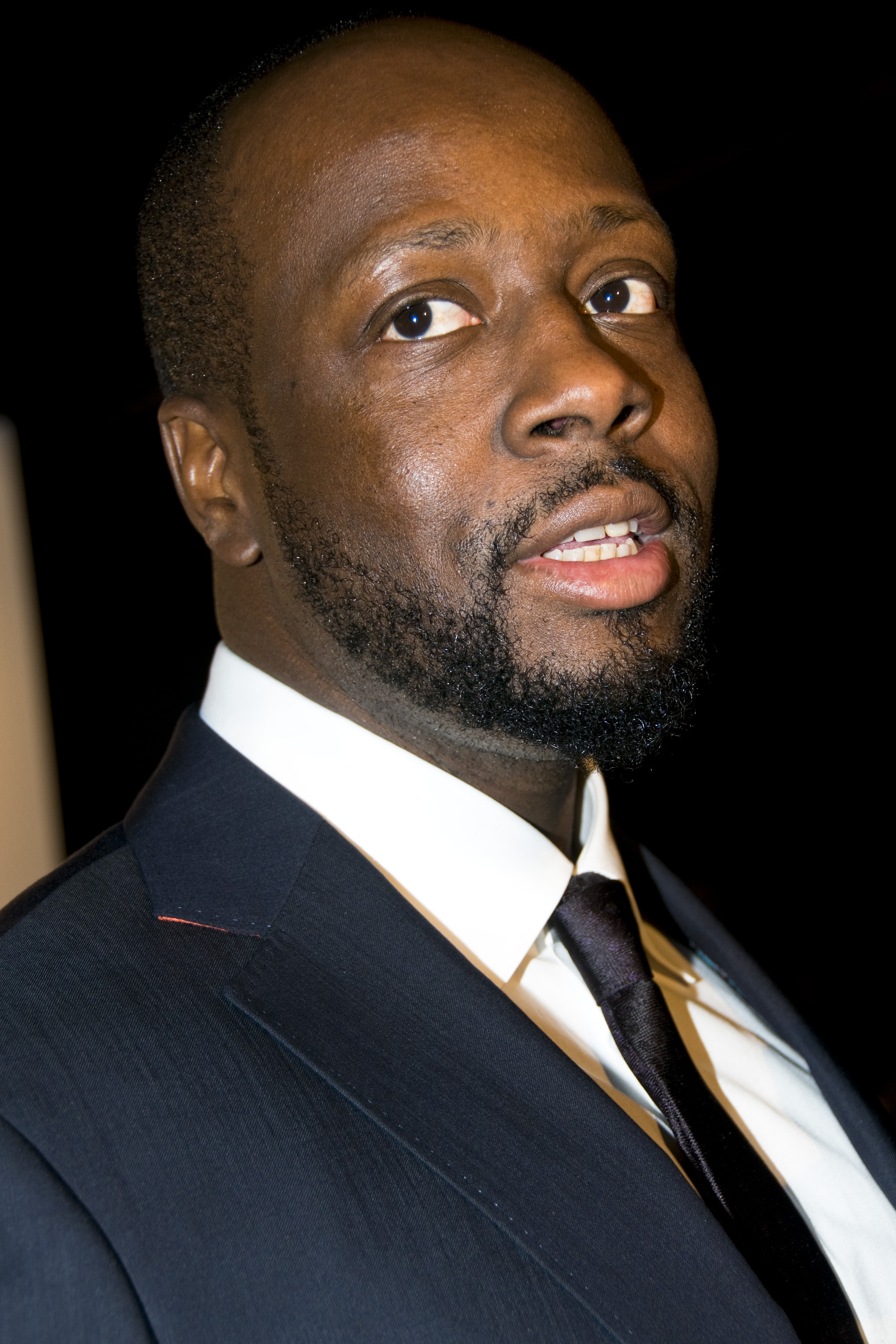
Wyclef Jean – Best Original Song

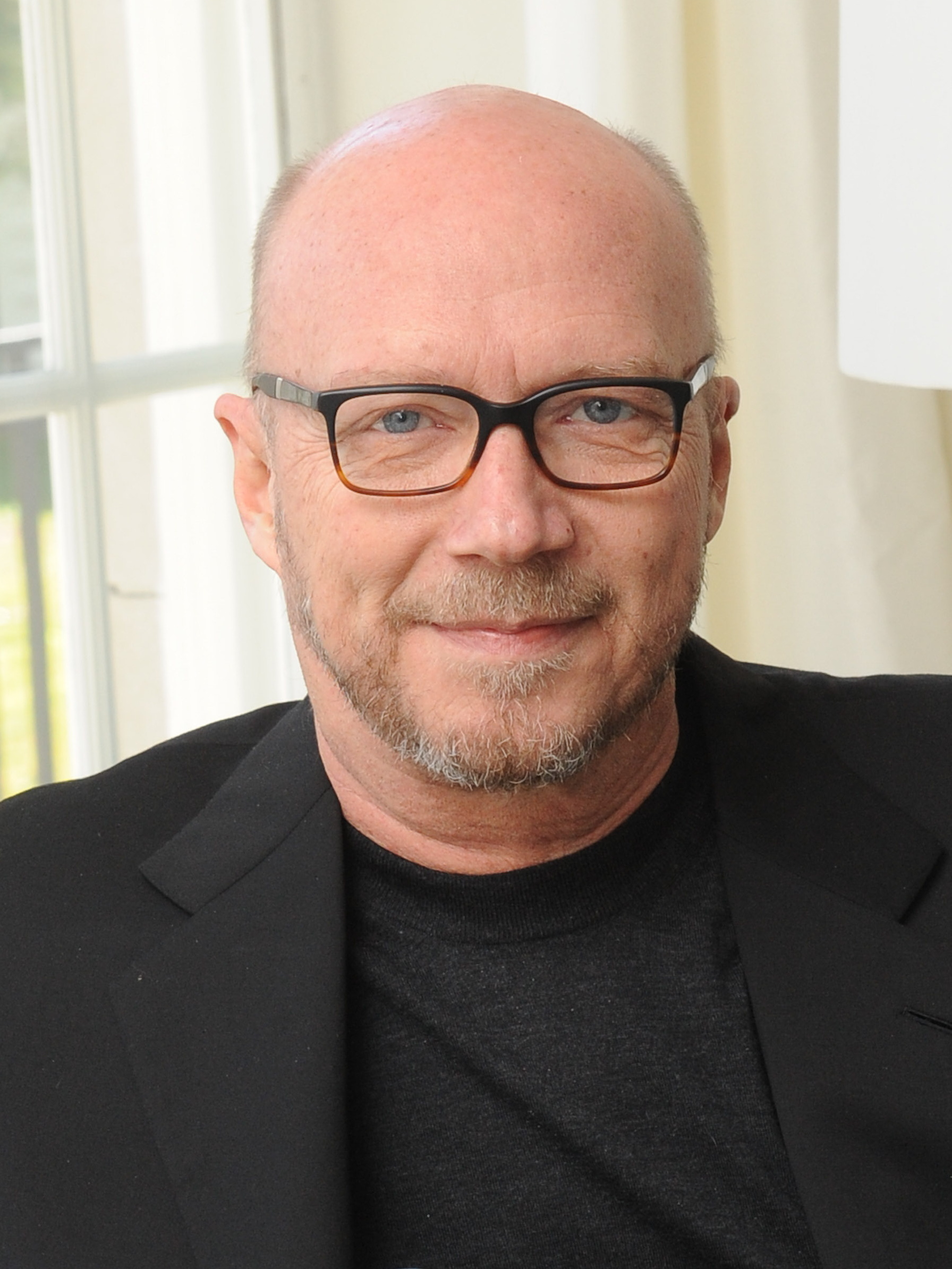
Paul Haggis – Best Adapted Screenplay

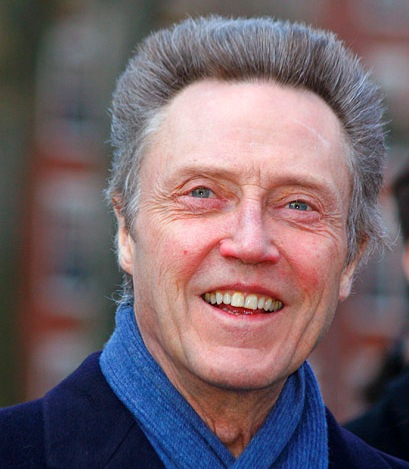
Christopher Walken – Best Supporting Actor in a Motion Picture, Drama

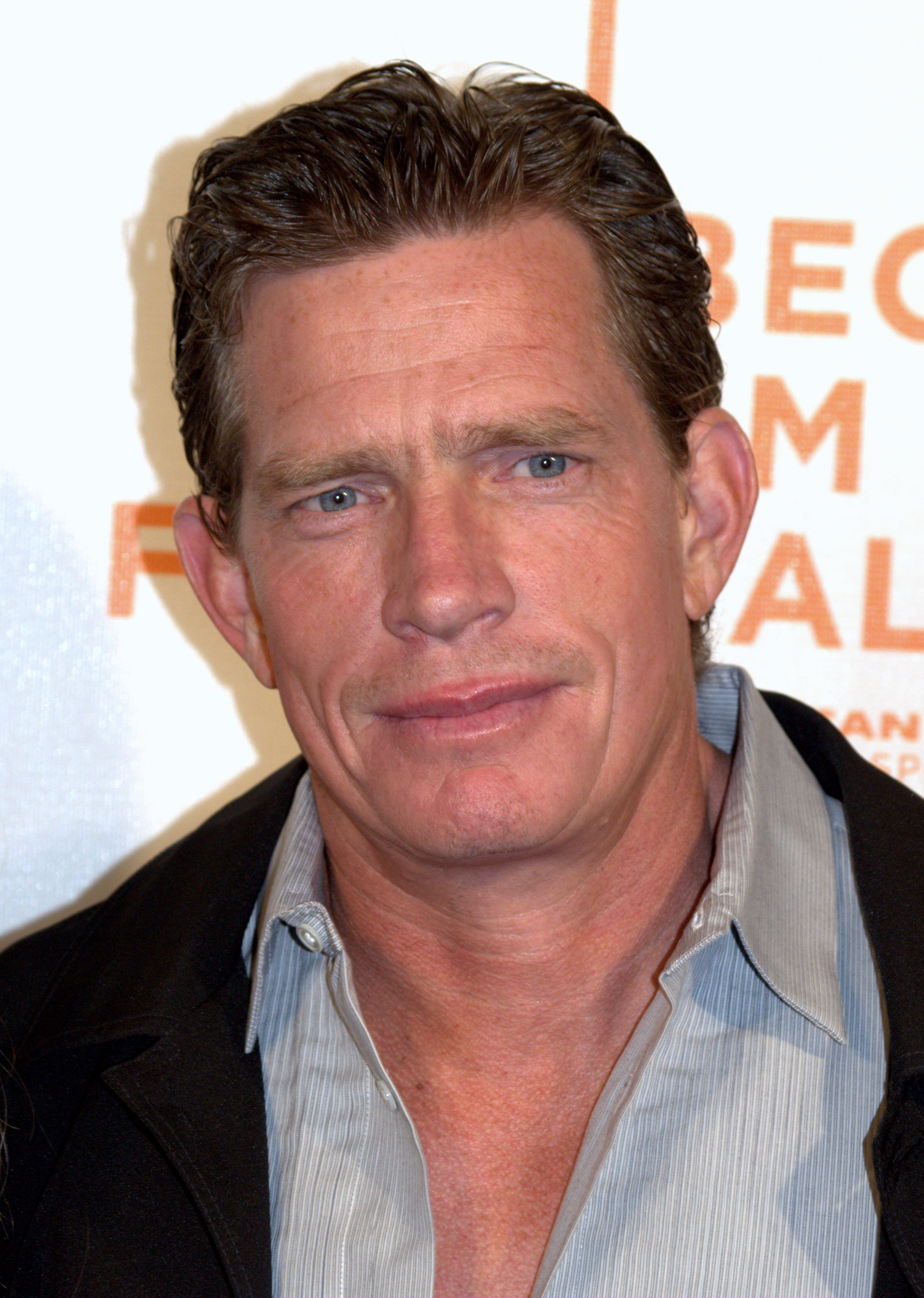
Thomas Haden Church – Best Supporting Actor in a Motion Picture, Comedy or Musical

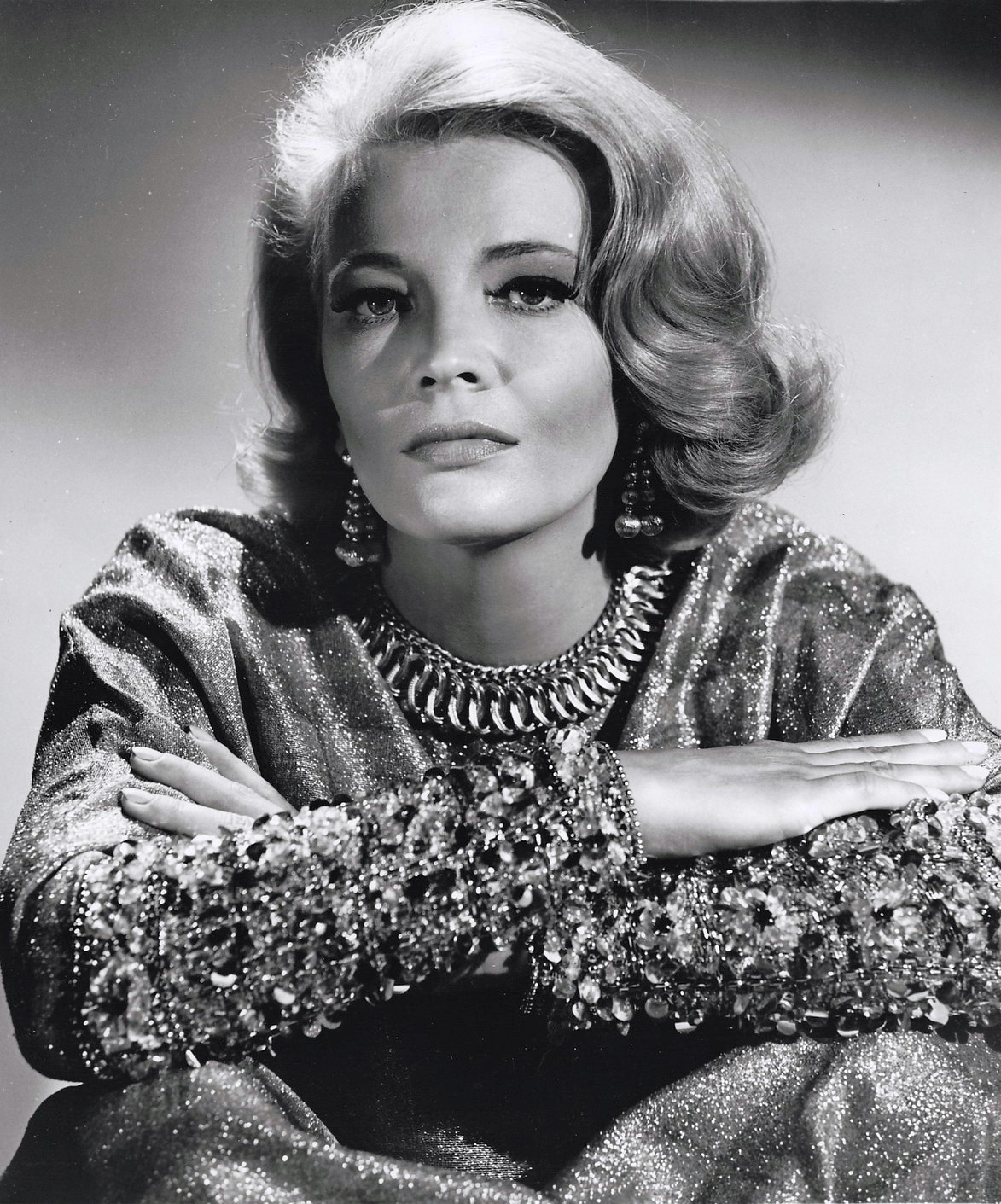
Gena Rowlands – Best Supporting Actress in a Motion Picture, Drama

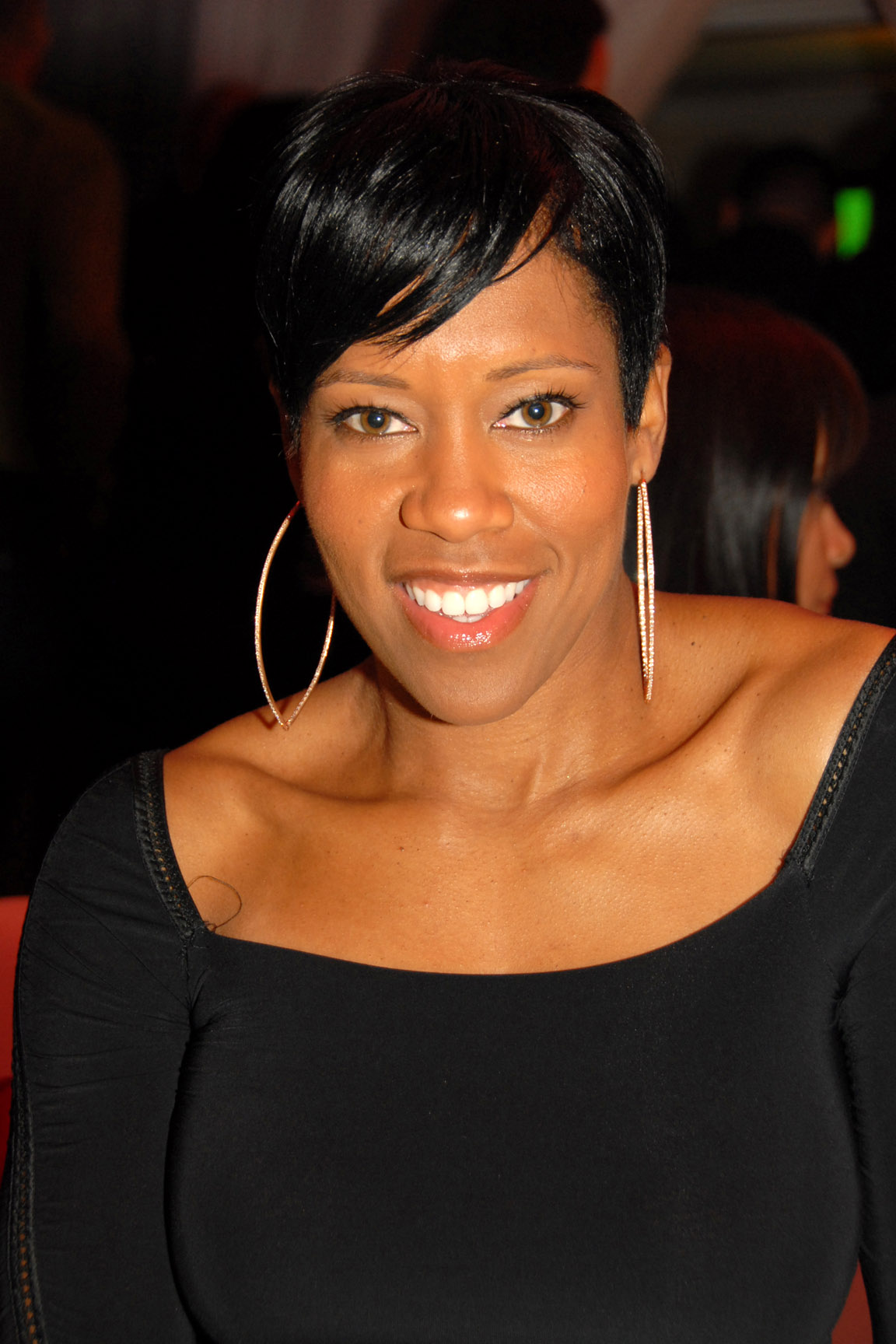
Regina King – Best Supporting Actress in a Motion Picture, Comedy or Musical

=== Best Actor – Drama ===
Don Cheadle – Hotel Rwanda

- Kevin Bacon – The Woodsman
- Javier Bardem – The Sea Inside (Mar adentro)
- Gael García Bernal – The Motorcycle Diaries (Diarios de motocicleta)
- Johnny Depp – Finding Neverland
- Liam Neeson – Kinsey
- Sean Penn – The Assassination of Richard Nixon

=== Best Actor – Musical or Comedy ===
Jamie Foxx – Ray

- Gerard Butler – The Phantom of the Opera
- Jim Carrey – Eternal Sunshine of the Spotless Mind
- Paul Giamatti – Sideways
- Kevin Kline – De-Lovely
- Bill Murray – The Life Aquatic with Steve Zissou

=== Best Actress – Drama ===
Hilary Swank – Million Dollar Baby

- Laura Linney – P.S.
- Catalina Sandino Moreno – Maria Full of Grace
- Imelda Staunton – Vera Drake
- Uma Thurman – Kill Bill: Volume 2
- Sigourney Weaver – Imaginary Heroes

=== Best Actress – Musical or Comedy ===
Annette Bening – Being Julia

- Jena Malone – Saved!
- Natalie Portman – Garden State
- Emmy Rossum – The Phantom of the Opera
- Kerry Washington – Ray
- Kate Winslet – Eternal Sunshine of the Spotless Mind

=== Best Animated or Mixed Media Film ===
The Incredibles

- The Polar Express
- Shrek 2
- The SpongeBob SquarePants Movie
- Teacher's Pet
- Team America: World Police

=== Best Art Direction and Production Design ===
De-Lovely

- The Aviator
- House of Flying Daggers (Shi mian mai fu)
- The Phantom of the Opera
- Sky Captain and the World of Tomorrow
- Vanity Fair

=== Best Cinematography ===
House of Flying Daggers (Shi mian mai fu) – Zhao Xiaoding

- The Aviator
- Lemony Snicket's A Series of Unfortunate Events
- The Phantom of the Opera
- Spider-Man 2
- A Very Long Engagement (Un long dimanche de fiançailles)

=== Best Costume Design ===
Vanity Fair – Beatrix Aruna Pasztor

- The Aviator
- De-Lovely
- House of Flying Daggers (Shi mian mai fu)
- The Phantom of the Opera
- Sky Captain and the World of Tomorrow

=== Best Director ===
Mel Gibson – The Passion of the Christ

- Bill Condon – Kinsey
- Taylor Hackford – Ray
- Joshua Marston – Maria Full of Grace
- Alexander Payne – Sideways
- Martin Scorsese – The Aviator

=== Best Documentary Film ===
Super Size Me

- Born into Brothels
- The Fuente Family: An American Dream
- Lightning in a Bottle
- Touching the Void
- Tupac: Resurrection

=== Best Editing ===
Collateral – Jim Miller and Paul Rubell

- The Aviator
- Closer
- House of Flying Daggers (Shi mian mai fu)
- Lemony Snicket's A Series of Unfortunate Events
- Spider-Man 2

=== Best Film – Drama ===
Hotel Rwanda

- The Aviator
- Kill Bill: Volume 2
- Kinsey
- Maria Full of Grace
- Vera Drake

=== Best Film – Musical or Comedy ===
Sideways

- The Life Aquatic with Steve Zissou
- The Merchant of Venice
- Napoleon Dynamite
- The Phantom of the Opera
- Ray

=== Best Foreign Language Film ===
The Sea Inside (Mar adentro), Spain

- Bad Education (La mala educación), Spain
- Don't Move (Non ti muovere), Italy
- House of Flying Daggers (Shi mian mai fu), China
- The Motorcycle Diaries (Diarios de motocicleta), Argentina
- A Very Long Engagement (Un long dimanche de fiançailles), France

=== Best Original Score ===
"Napoleon Dynamite" – John Swihart

- "Alfie" – Mick Jagger, John Powell, and David A. Stewart
- "The Aviator" – Howard Shore
- "Finding Neverland" – Jan A. P. Kaczmarek
- "The Incredibles" – Michael Giacchino
- "Spider-Man 2" – Danny Elfman

=== Best Original Song ===
"Million Voices" written by Jerry Duplessis, Andrea Guerra, and Wyclef Jean – Hotel Rwanda

- "Believe" written by Glen Ballard and Alan Silvestri – The Polar Express
- "Blind Leading the Blind" written by Mick Jagger and David A. Stewart – Alfie
- "The Book of Love" written by Stephin Merritt – Shall We Dance
- "Learn to Be Lonely" written by Andrew Lloyd Webber – The Phantom of the Opera
- "Shine Ya Light" written by Robbie Robertson – Ladder 49

=== Best Screenplay – Adapted ===
Million Dollar Baby – Paul Haggis

- Closer – Patrick Marber
- The Phantom of the Opera – Joel Schumacher
- Sideways – Alexander Payne and Jim Taylor

=== Best Screenplay – Original ===
Ray – James L. White

- The Aviator – John Logan
- Collateral – Stuart Beattie
- Hotel Rwanda – Terry George and Keir Pearson
- Kinsey – Bill Condon
- The Life Aquatic with Steve Zissou – Wes Anderson and Noah Baumbach

=== Best Sound ===
Collateral

- Code 46
- The Aviator
- The Phantom of the Opera
- Spider-Man 2

=== Best Supporting Actor – Drama ===
Christopher Walken – Around the Bend

- David Carradine – Kill Bill: Volume 2
- Jamie Foxx – Collateral
- Alfred Molina – Spider-Man 2
- Clive Owen – Closer
- Peter Sarsgaard – Kinsey

=== Best Supporting Actor – Musical or Comedy ===
Thomas Haden Church – Sideways

- Joseph Fiennes – The Merchant of Venice
- Jeremy Irons – Being Julia
- Peter Sarsgaard – Garden State
- Mark Wahlberg – I Heart Huckabees
- Patrick Wilson – The Phantom of the Opera

=== Best Supporting Actress – Drama ===
Gena Rowlands – The Notebook

- Cate Blanchett – The Aviator
- Daryl Hannah – Kill Bill: Volume 2
- Laura Linney – Kinsey
- Natalie Portman – Closer
- Kyra Sedgwick – The Woodsman

=== Best Supporting Actress – Musical or Comedy ===
Regina King – Ray

- Lynn Collins – The Merchant of Venice
- Minnie Driver – The Phantom of the Opera
- Cloris Leachman – Spanglish
- Virginia Madsen – Sideways
- Sharon Warren – Ray

=== Best Visual Effects ===
The Aviator (TIE)
House of Flying Daggers (Shi mian mai fu) (TIE)

- Collateral
- Eternal Sunshine of the Spotless Mind
- Sky Captain and the World of Tomorrow
- Spider-Man 2

=== Outstanding Motion Picture Ensemble ===
Sideways

== Television winners and nominees ==
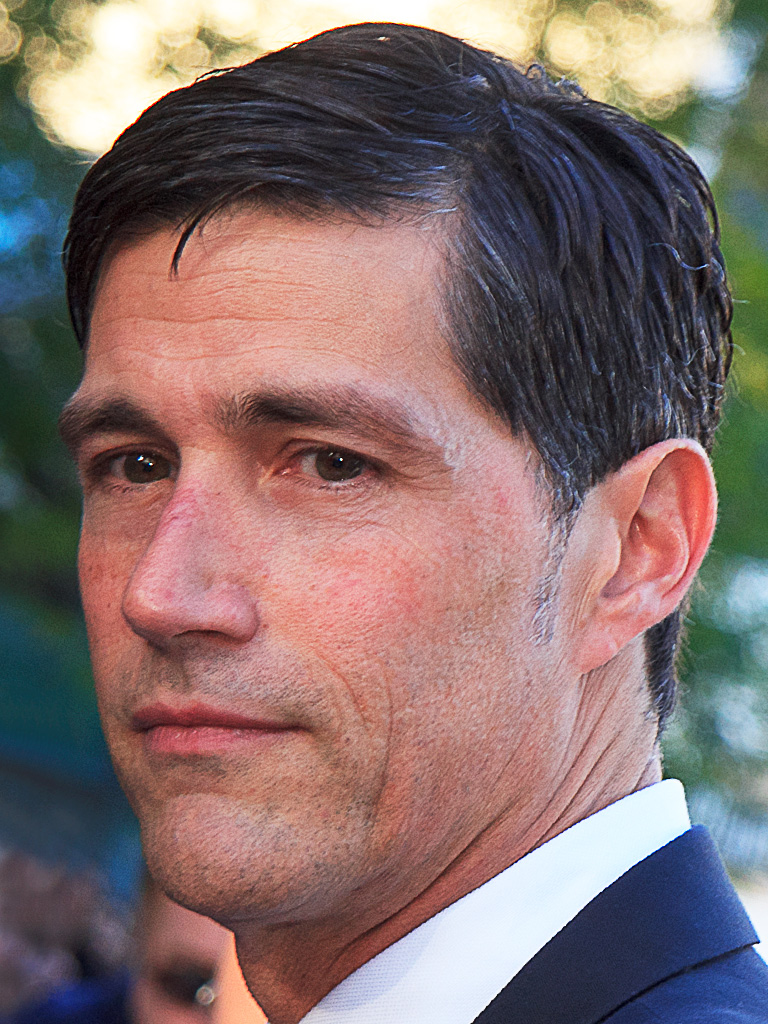
Matthew Fox – Best Actor in a Series, Drama

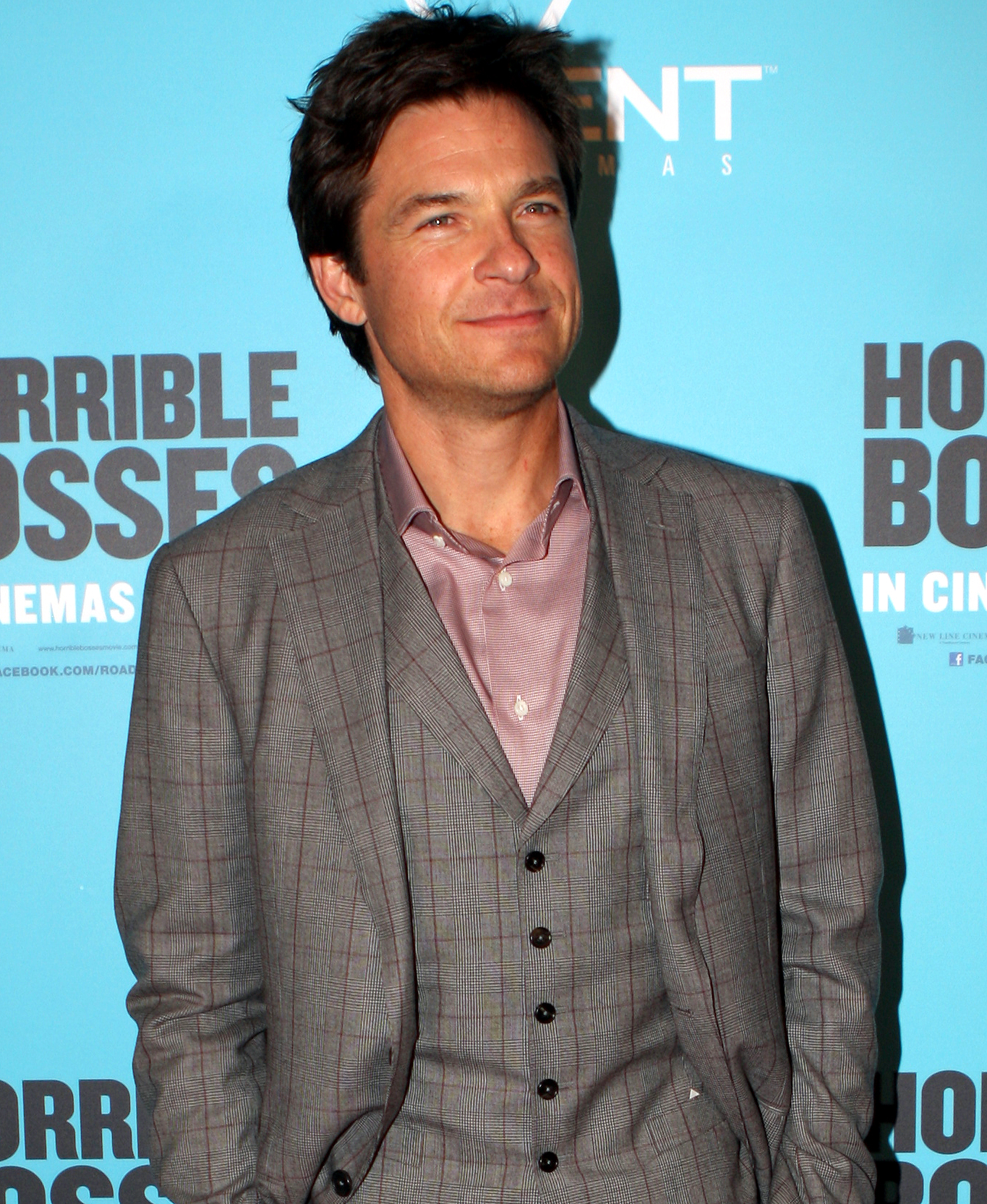
Jason Bateman – Best Actor in a Series, Comedy or Musical

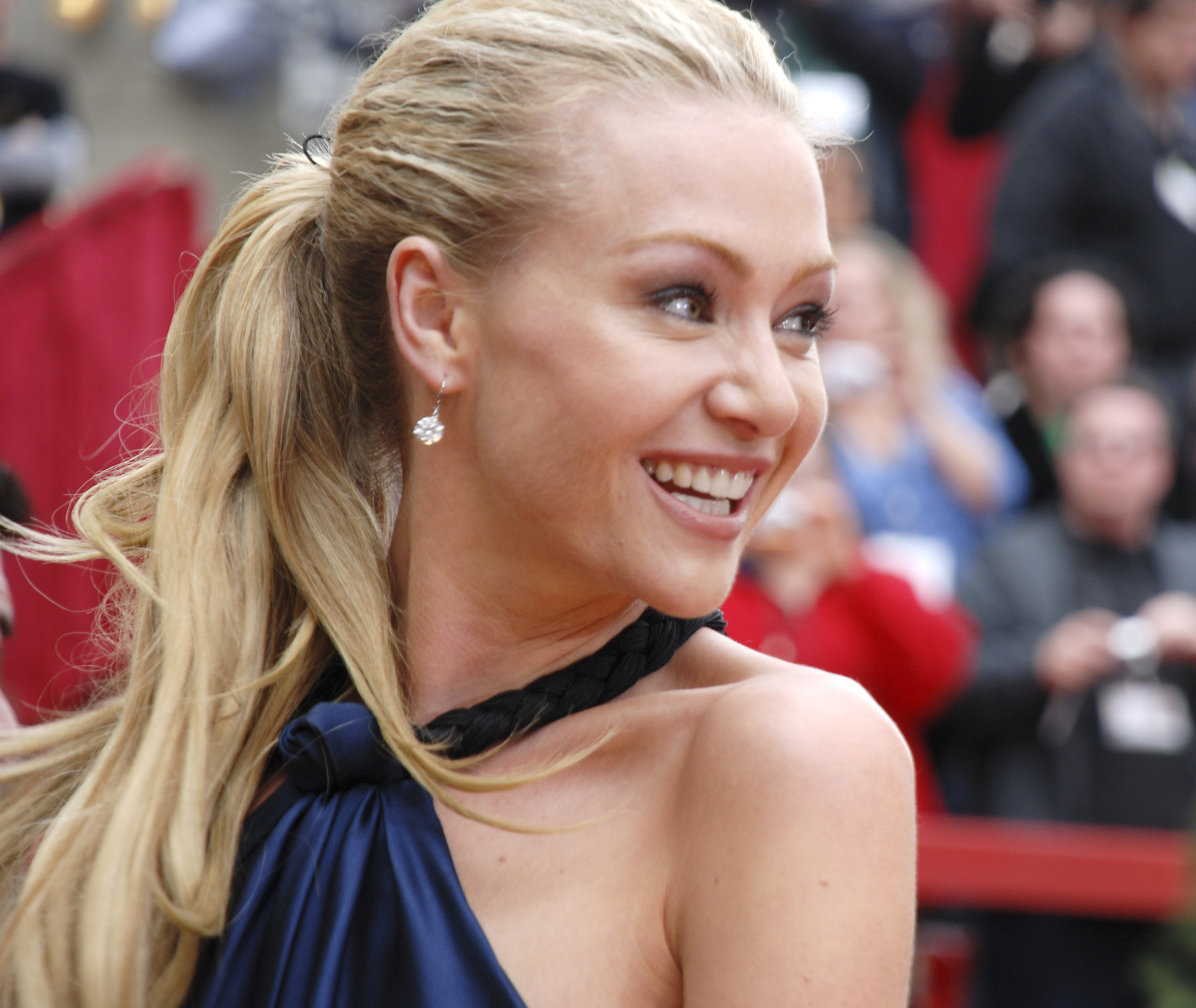
Portia de Rossi – Best Actress in a Series, Comedy or Musical

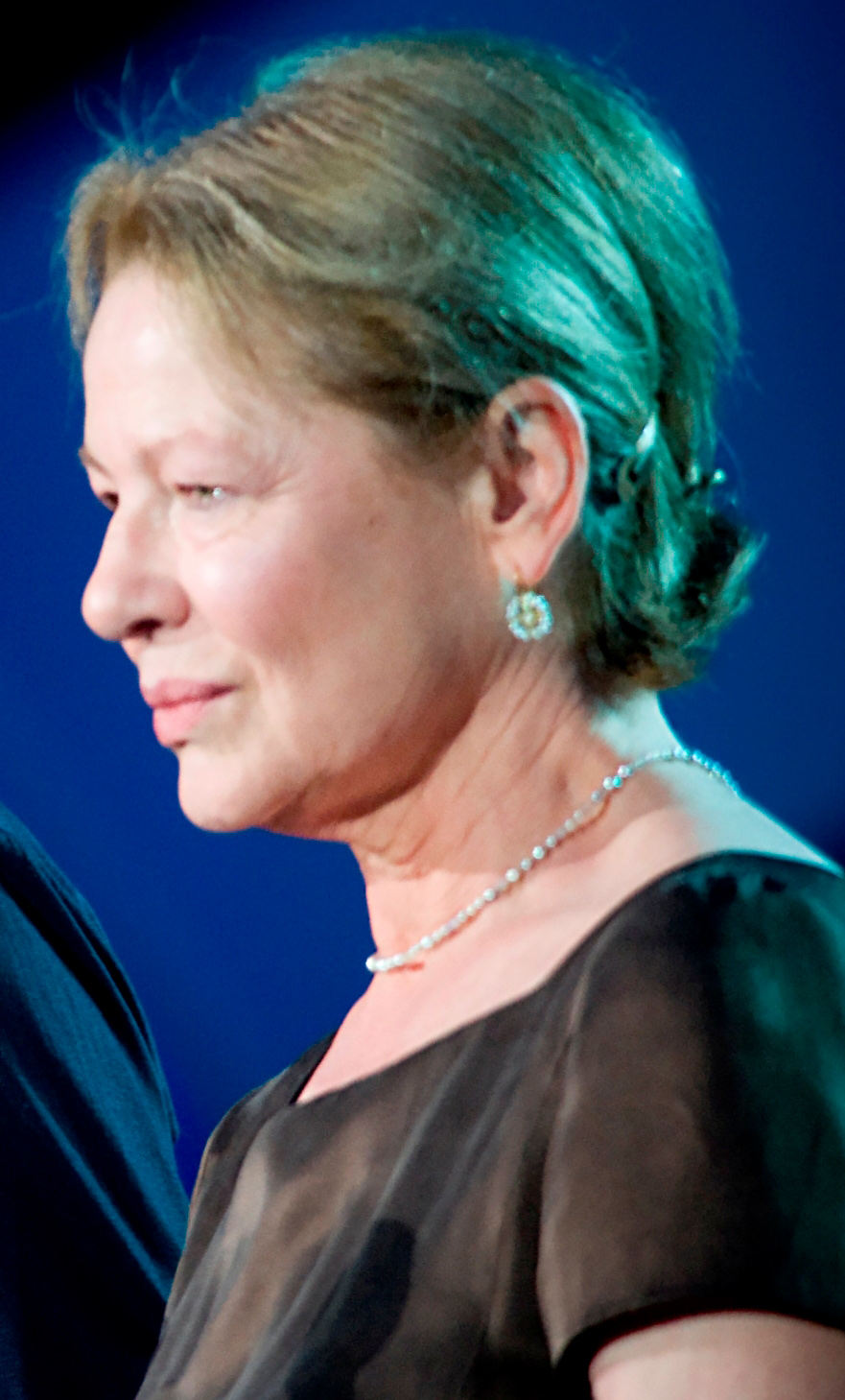
Dianne Wiest – Best Actress in a Miniseries or Television Film

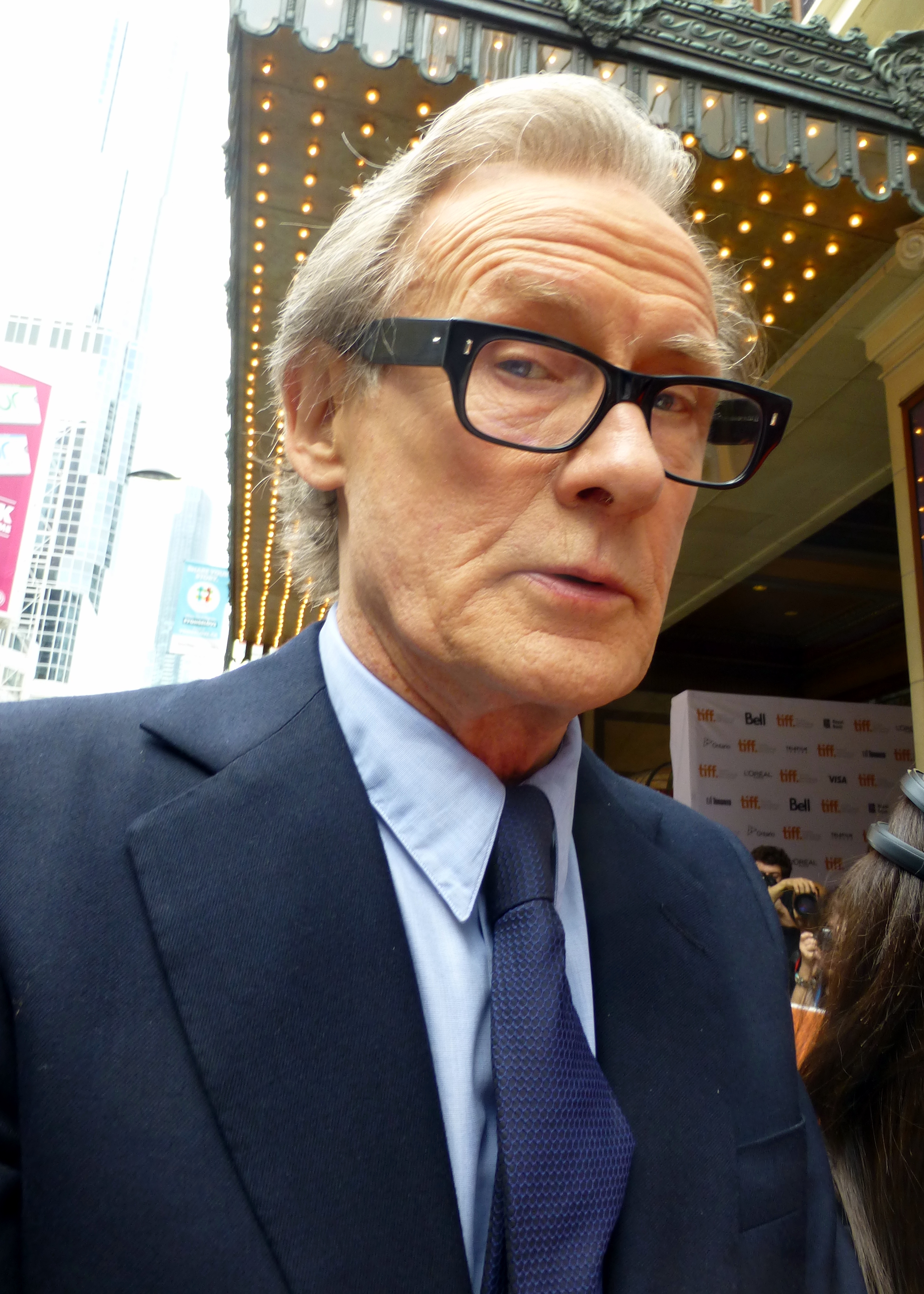
Bill Nighy – Best Supporting Actor in a Series, Miniseries or Television Film

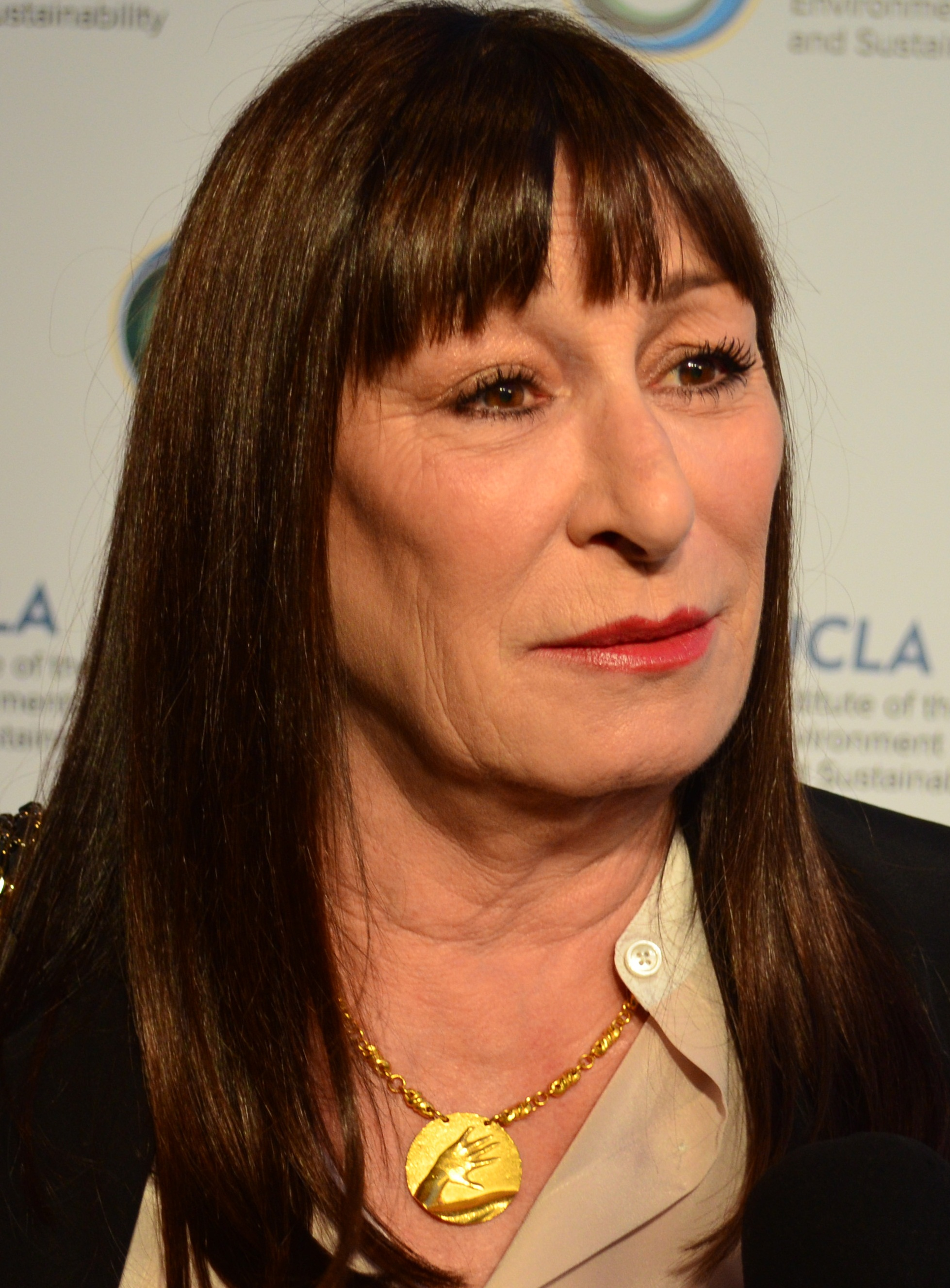
Anjelica Huston – Best Supporting Actress in a Series, Miniseries or Television Film

=== Best Actor – Drama Series ===
Matthew Fox – Lost

- Vincent D'Onofrio – Law & Order
- Anthony LaPaglia – Without a Trace
- James Spader – Boston Legal
- Treat Williams – Everwood

=== Best Actor – Musical or Comedy Series ===
Jason Bateman – Arrested Development

- Zach Braff – Scrubs
- Larry David – Curb Your Enthusiasm
- Bernie Mac – The Bernie Mac Show
- Damon Wayans – My Wife and Kids

=== Best Actor – Miniseries or TV Film ===
Jamie Foxx – Redemption: The Stan Tookie Williams Story

- Keith Carradine – Deadwood
- Mos Def – Something the Lord Made
- Alan Rickman – Something the Lord Made
- Geoffrey Rush – The Life and Death of Peter Sellers

=== Best Actress – Drama Series ===
Laurel Holloman – The L Word

- Jennifer Garner – Alias
- Evangeline Lilly – Lost
- Joely Richardson – Nip/Tuck
- Amber Tamblyn – Joan of Arcadia

=== Best Actress – Musical or Comedy Series ===
Portia de Rossi – Arrested Development

- Marcia Cross – Desperate Housewives
- Lauren Graham – Gilmore Girls
- Teri Hatcher – Desperate Housewives
- Felicity Huffman – Desperate Housewives
- Maya Rudolph – Saturday Night Live

=== Best Actress – Miniseries or TV Film ===
Dianne Wiest – The Blackwater Lightship

- Clea DuVall – Helter Skelter
- Angela Lansbury – The Blackwater Lightship
- Helen Mirren – Prime Suspect: The Last Witness
- Miranda Richardson – The Lost Prince

=== Best Miniseries ===
The Lost Prince

- The 4400
- American Family
- The Last King
- Prime Suspect: The Last Witness
- The Second Coming

=== Best Series – Drama ===
Nip/Tuck

- Boston Legal
- The L Word
- Lost
- The Shield

=== Best Series – Musical or Comedy ===
Desperate Housewives

- Arrested Development
- The Bernie Mac Show
- Gilmore Girls
- Scrubs

=== Best Supporting Actor – Miniseries or TV Film ===
Bill Nighy – The Lost Prince

- Brad Dourif – Deadwood
- Balthazar Getty – Traffic
- William H. Macy – Stealing Sinatra
- Keith McErlean – The Blackwater Lightship

=== Best Supporting Actress – Miniseries or TV Film ===
Anjelica Huston – Iron Jawed Angels

- Mary Stuart Masterson – Something the Lord Made
- Helen McCrory – Charles II: The Power and the Passion
- Gina McKee – The Lost Prince
- Emily Watson – The Life and Death of Peter Sellers

=== Best TV Film ===
Redemption: The Stan Tookie Williams Story

- Helter Skelter
- Iron Jawed Angels
- The Life and Death of Peter Sellers
- Something the Lord Made

== New Media winners and nominees ==
For the game categories, only nominees are listed; winners are unknown:

=== Best Classic DVD ===
La Dolce Vita

- The China Syndrome
- Easy Rider
- Fanny and Alexander
- Murder on the Orient Express
- Persuasion, Little Women, and Sense and Sensibility (for the Classic Masterpiece Book & DVD set)
- Ragtime
- The Snake Pit
- Star Wars, The Empire Strikes Back, and Return of the Jedi (for the Star Wars Trilogy)
- Time Bandits (for the Divimax Special Edition)
- Zorba the Greek

=== Best Documentary DVD ===
Broadway: The American Musical

- Ancient Mysteries and Rise and Fall of the Spartans (for the "Troy – Unearthing the Legend" DVD)
- Brooklyn Bridge, The Statue of Liberty, Huey Long, The Congress, Thomas Hart Benton, Empire of the Air: The Men Who Made Radio, and The Shakers: Hands to Work, Hearts to God (for the Ken Burns' America Collection)
- Capturing the Friedmans
- Fahrenheit 9/11
- In the Footsteps of Alexander the Great
- It's All True
- Seven Up!, 7 Plus Seven, 21 Up, 28 Up, 35 Up, and 42 Up (for the "Up" film series)
- Spellbound
- Super Size Me

=== Best DVD Extras ===
Maria Full of Grace (for the documentary)

- Angel (for Season 4; for the commentary)
- Buffy the Vampire Slayer (for Season 6; for the commentary)
- Easy Rider (for the documentary)
- Ed Wood (for the commentary)
- La Dolce Vita (for the commentary)

=== Best DVD Release of TV Shows ===
Seinfeld

- 24 (for Season 3)
- Alias (for Season 3)
- Angel (for Season 4)
- Buffy the Vampire Slayer (for Season 6)
- Felicity (for Edition III)
- Frasier (for The Final Season)
- Sex and the City (for Season 6)
- Taxi (for The Complete First Season)
- Terrahawks

=== Outstanding Game Based on a Previous Medium ===
- The Chronicles of Riddick: Escape from Butcher Bay
- GoldenEye: Rogue Agent
- Harry Potter and the Prisoner of Azkaban
- The Incredibles
- Rocky Legends
- Star Wars Knights of the Old Republic II: The Sith Lords
- X-Men Legends

=== Outstanding Overall DVD ===
Spider-Man 2

- Angel (for Season 4)
- Broadway: The American Musical
- Buffy the Vampire Slayer (for Season 6)
- Dawn of the Dead (for the Ultimate Edition)
- Easy Rider
- La Dolce Vita
- The Lord of the Rings: The Return of the King
- The Matrix, The Matrix Reloaded, The Matrix Revolutions, and The Animatrix (for The Ultimate Matrix Collection)
- Pirates of the Caribbean: The Curse of the Black Pearl (for the 3-Disc Gift Set)
- Star Wars, The Empire Strikes Back, and Return of the Jedi (for the Star Wars Trilogy)

=== Outstanding Platform Action/Adventure Game ===
- Call of Duty: Finest Hour
- Doom 3
- Grand Theft Auto: San Andreas
- Halo 2
- Metroid Prime 2: Echoes
- Mortal Kombat: Deception

=== Outstanding Puzzle/Strategy Game ===
- The Guy Game
- Katamari Damacy
- Sid Meier's Pirates!
- Ultra Bust-A-Move X
- The Urbz: Sims in the City
- Worms 3D

=== Outstanding Sports Game ===
- ESPN NFL 2K5
- Major League Baseball 2005
- MX Unleashed
- NBA Ballers
- NFL Street
- Tony Hawk's Underground 2

=== Outstanding Youth DVD ===
The Iron Giant

- Aladdin (for the Special Platinum Edition)
- The Big Snooze, Beep, Beep, Bad Ol' Putty Tat, and Back Alley Oproar (for Looney Tunes: Golden Collection – Volume 2)
- Elf
- Ella Enchanted
- Meet Me in St. Louis
- Mulan (for the Special Edition)
- Rocky and His Friends (for The Complete Second Season)
- Seven Brides for Seven Brothers (for the Warner Bros. Edition)
- SpongeBob SquarePants (for The Complete Second Season)
- Terrahawks

== Awards breakdown ==
=== Film ===
Winners:

3 / 4 Hotel Rwanda: Best Actor & Film – Drama / Best Original Song
3 / 7 Ray: Best Actor – Musical or Comedy / Best Supporting Actress – Musical or Comedy / Best Screenplay – Original
3 / 7 Sideways: Best Film – Musical or Comedy / Best Supporting Actor – Musical or Comedy / Outstanding Motion Picture Ensemble
2 / 2 Million Dollar Baby: Best Actress – Drama / Best Screenplay – Adapted
2 / 5 Collateral: Best Editing / Best Sound
2 / 6 House of Flying Daggers (Shi mian mai fu): Best Cinematography / Best Visual Effects
1 / 1 Around the Bend: Best Supporting Actor – Drama
1 / 1 The Notebook: Best Supporting Actress – Drama
1 / 1 The Passion of the Christ: Best Director
1 / 1 Super Size Me: Best Documentary Film
1 / 2 Being Julia: Best Actress – Musical or Comedy
1 / 2 The Incredibles: Best Animated or Mixed Media Film
1 / 2 Napoleon Dynamite: Best Original Score
1 / 2 The Sea Inside (Mar adentro): Best Foreign Language Film
1 / 2 Vanity Fair: Best Costume Design
1 / 3 De-Lovely: Best Art Direction and Production Design
1 / 11 The Aviator: Best Visual Effects

Losers:

0 / 11 The Phantom of the Opera
0 / 6 Kinsey, Spider-Man 2
0 / 4 Closer, Kill Bill: Volume 2
0 / 3 Eternal Sunshine of the Spotless Mind, The Life Aquatic with Steve Zissou, Maria Full of Grace, The Merchant of Venice, Sky Captain and the World of Tomorrow
0 / 2 Alfie, Finding Neverland, Garden State, Lemony Snicket's A Series of Unfortunate Events, The Motorcycle Diaries (Diarios de motocicleta), The Polar Express, Vera Drake, A Very Long Engagement (Un long dimanche de fiançailles), The Woodsman

=== Television ===
Winners:

2 / 2 Redemption: The Stan Tookie Williams Story: Best Actor – Miniseries or TV Film / Best TV Film
2 / 3 Arrested Development: Best Actor & Actress – Musical or Comedy Series
2 / 4 The Lost Prince: Best Miniseries / Best Supporting Actor – Miniseries or TV Film
1 / 2 Iron Jawed Angels: Best Supporting Actress – Miniseries or TV Film
1 / 2 The L Word: Best Actress – Drama Series
1 / 2 Nip/Tuck: Best Series – Drama
1 / 3 The Blackwater Lightship: Best Actress – Miniseries or TV Film
1 / 3 Lost: Best Actor – Drama Series
1 / 4 Desperate Housewives: Best Series – Musical or Comedy Series

Losers:

0 / 4 Something the Lord Made
0 / 3 The Life and Death of Peter Sellers
0 / 2 The Bernie Mac Show, Boston Legal, Deadwood, Gilmore Girls, Helter Skelter, Prime Suspect: The Last Witness, Scrubs
