= From tha Roota to tha Toota =

Studio album by Field Mob
- Released: October 22, 2002
- Recorded: 2001–2002
- Genre: Hip-hop
- Length: 59:44
- Label: MCA
- Producers: Jeff Redd; Sid 'Uncle Jamz' Johnson; Toney 'Montana' Mosley; Jazze Pha; Earthtone III

Field Mob chronology
613: Ashy to Classy (2000)	From tha Roota to tha Toota (2002)	Light Poles and Pine Trees (2006)

Singles from From tha Roota to tha Toota
- 1. "Sick of Being Lonely" Released: August 13, 2002; 2. "All I Know" Released: 2003

Professional ratings
Review scores
Source	Rating
AllMusic	4/5 stars

From tha Roota to tha Toota is the second album from the hip-hop duo Field Mob released under MCA Records. It was released to stores on October 22, 2002. The title of the album is a colloquial southern United States reference to making use of an entire pig – from the snout to the tail. The LP spawned the Jazze Pha produced single "Sick of Being Lonely" which reached No. 18 on the US Billboard Hot 100 and #5 on the US Billboard Hot Rap Tracks charts in 2002. This album reached No. 33 on the US Billboard Top 200 and #4 on the US Top R&B/Hip-Hop Albums charts. It has since been certified gold, selling over 700,000 copies.

== Track listing ==
No.	Title	Length
1.	"K.A.N." (featuring Sleepy Brown & Slimm Calhoun)	4:12
2.	"Nothing 2 Lose"	5:44
3.	"Don't Want No Problems"	4:53
4.	"Bitter Broads" (Interlude)	1:51
5.	"Sick of Being Lonely" (featuring Torica)	3:49
6.	"Where R U Going?" (featuring Joi)	4:14
7.	"It's Hell" (featuring Ole-E)	4:51
8.	"ConverHation" (Skit)	3:09
9.	"Haters" (featuring Trick Daddy)	4:03
10.	"Hit It for Free" (featuring Kokane)	4:59
11.	"Kuntry Cooking" (Skit)	1:38
12.	"Betty Rocker"	3:34
13.	"Cut Loose"	4:57
14.	"All I Know" (featuring CeeLo Green & Greg Street)	3:54
15.	"Sick of Being Lonely (Dirty South Remix)" (featuring Torica & Trina)	3:46

== Charts ==
=== Weekly charts ===
Chart (2002)	Peak position
US Billboard 200	33
US Top R&B/Hip-Hop Albums (Billboard)	4

=== Year-end charts ===
Chart (2003)	Position
US Top R&B/Hip-Hop Albums (Billboard)	78
