= Ray (film) =

2004 film by Taylor Hackford

- Theatrical release poster
- Directed by: Taylor Hackford
- Screenplay by: James L. White
- Story by: Taylor Hackford; James L. White
- Produced by: Taylor Hackford; Stuart Benjamin; Howard Baldwin; Karen Baldwin
- Starring: Jamie Foxx; Kerry Washington; Clifton Powell; Harry Lennix; Terrence Howard; Larenz Tate; Richard Schiff; Regina King
- Cinematography: Paweł Edelman
- Edited by: Paul Hirsch
- Music by: Craig Armstrong
- Production companies: Bristol Bay Productions; Anvil Films; Baldwin Entertainment Group
- Distributed by: Universal Pictures
- Release date: October 29, 2004
- Running time: 152 minutes
- Country: United States
- Language: English
- Budget: $40 million
- Box office: $124 million

Ray is a 2004 American biographical drama film focusing on 30 years in the life of soul musician Ray Charles. (Note: Director Taylor Hackford noted this focus on the years 1935–1965 in his DVD commentary for the film; the only exception to this focus is the film's final scene featuring Julian Bond and set in the Georgia State Capitol in 1979, a scene Hackford included at Charles' specific request.) The independently produced film was co-produced and directed by Taylor Hackford; it was written by James L. White from a story by Hackford and White. It stars Jamie Foxx as Charles, along with Kerry Washington, Clifton Powell, Harry Lennix, Terrence Howard, Larenz Tate, Richard Schiff, and Regina King in supporting roles. Along with Hackford, the film was also produced by Stuart Benjamin, Howard Baldwin, and Karen Baldwin.

Ray was released on October 29, 2004, by Universal Pictures. It received generally positive reviews from critics, with particular praise for Foxx's performance and became a box office success, grossing $124 million worldwide on a budget of $40 million. Ray received many accolades and nominations and was nominated in six categories at the 77th Academy Awards, including Best Picture, and won two: Best Actor for Foxx and Best Sound Mixing. Foxx also won Best Actor at the Golden Globe, BAFTA, Screen Actors Guild, and Critics' Choice becoming the second actor to win all five major lead actor awards for the same performance.

Charles had planned to attend a screening of the completed film, but died of liver disease in June 2004, four months prior to the premiere; the film is dedicated in his memory.

== Plot ==
Ray Charles Robinson is raised in poverty in Florida by his mother, Aretha. Learning to play piano at an early age, Ray is haunted by the accidental death of his younger brother George, who drowns in their mother's washbasin. Ray loses his vision by age seven and becomes completely blind. Aretha teaches him to be independent, eventually sending him to a school for the deaf and blind.

In 1946, Ray joins a white country band and wears sunglasses to hide his damaged eyes. Two years later, he travels to Seattle and joins a nightclub band, though the club's owner demands sexual favors and controls his money and career. After discovering he is being exploited, Ray signs his own record deal and leaves the band. Touring on the Chitlin' Circuit as "Ray Charles", he is introduced to heroin.

Ray is discovered by Ahmet Ertegun of Atlantic Records and records his first hit with Ertegun's song "Mess Around". In Houston, Ray falls in love with Della Bea, a preacher's daughter. Though she and others are unhappy about Ray mixing gospel with his music, he marries Della and continues to gain fame with "I Got a Woman" and "Hallelujah I Love Her So".

A pregnant Della finds Ray's drug kit and confronts him. They reconcile after the birth of their first child, but Ray begins an affair with singer Mary Anne Fisher. In 1956, as Ray's popularity grows, he hires a trio to become "The Raelettes" and immediately falls for lead singer Margie Hendrix. They begin their own affair, and a jealous Mary Anne leaves.

Margie asks Ray to let her try heroin, but he orders her to stay away from it. His producers recognize his now-complete addiction as he presents symptoms while recording "Night Time Is the Right Time" on a new electric piano, but despite their concern they recognize his genius and his recording career continues.

A few years later, when Ray's band finishes a set early and the club's owner demands they play the remaining time, Ray performs "What'd I Say" on the spot. His popularity rises through the 1950s and he moves his family to Los Angeles but continues to use heroin, straining his relationships with Della and Margie. In 1960, he signs a better contract with ABC Records, negotiating to own his master tapes.

Ray continues to develop his music, recording such hits as "Georgia on My Mind". Margie reveals she is pregnant, and cuts off their affair when Ray demands she end the pregnancy. He writes "Hit the Road Jack" with a solo by Margie, who uses her newfound recognition to embark on a solo career, while Ray struggles with his addiction.

In 1961, Ray encounters civil rights protestors outside his concert in Augusta, Georgia. Deciding not to play at the segregated venue, he cancels the concert and is banned from playing in Georgia. After he allows black and white audience members to dance together onstage during a concert in Indianapolis, his hotel room is raided by police. His arrest for heroin possession is made public, to Della's dismay, but his record label has the charges dismissed.

In St. Louis, Ray performs the country-influenced "I Can't Stop Loving You" and is impressed by announcer Joe Adams, who joins his tour. Ray moves his family to Beverly Hills, and learns that Margie has died of an overdose. Joe alienates Ray's band and his longtime friend and manager Jeff Brown, whom Ray fires for stealing.

In 1965, Ray returns from a concert in Montreal and is again arrested for heroin possession. Dismissing his excuses, Della pleads with him to overcome his habit, and he is sentenced to drug rehabilitation. Suffering vivid nightmares during withdrawal, Ray learns to play chess with Dr. Hacker and Hacker explains to him that his lawyer's arguments with the judge agreed to probation in Boston under the condition that he completes his drug rehab program and agrees to take periodic drug tests. Ray has a vision of George and their mother, who, while praising the fact he became a success, chastises him for letting his addictions cripple him, with George telling Ray that his death was not his fault.

By 1979, Ray has permanently quit heroin and receives an official apology from the state of Georgia, which names "Georgia On My Mind" the official state song. Ray goes on to have a long and successful career as a world-famous entertainer until his death in 2004.

== Cast ==
- Jamie Foxx as Ray Charles Robinson
  - C. J. Sanders as young Ray Charles Robinson
- Kerry Washington as Della Bea Robinson
- Clifton Powell as Jeff Brown
- Aunjanue Ellis as Mary Ann Fisher
- Harry Lennix as Joe Adams
- Terrence Howard as Gossie McKee
- Larenz Tate as Quincy Jones
- Bokeem Woodbine as Fathead Newman
- Sharon Warren as Aretha Robinson
- Curtis Armstrong as Ahmet Ertegun of Atlantic Records
- Richard Schiff as Jerry Wexler
- Wendell Pierce as Wilbur Brassfield, manager
- Chris Thomas King as Lowell Fulson
- David Krumholtz as Milt Shaw
- Kurt Fuller as Sam Clark of ABC Records
- Warwick Davis as Oberon
- Terrone Bell as young George Robinson
- Tequan Richmond as Ray Charles Robinson Jr.
  - Eric O'Neal, Jr. as young Ray Charles Robinson Jr.
- Patrick Bauchau as Dr. Hacker
- Robert Wisdom as Jack Lauderdale of Swing Time Records
- Denise Dowse as Marlene Andre
- Regina King as Margie Hendricks
- Rick Gomez as Tom Dowd

== Production ==
The film's production was entirely financed by Philip Anschutz, through his Bristol Bay Productions company. Taylor Hackford said that it took 15 years to make the film; or more specifically, as he later clarified in the liner notes of the soundtrack album, this is how long it took him to secure the financing. It was made on a budget of $40 million.

Charles was given a Braille copy of the film's original script; he objected only to a scene showing him taking up piano grudgingly, and a scene implying that Charles had shown mistress and lead "Raelette" Margie Hendricks how to shoot heroin.

Hackford originally had the idea of using a stunt double to make it look like Foxx was playing the piano but was shocked to find out that he went to college on a classical piano scholarship. Foxx does not sing as Charles with exception to cover versions Charles performs in his earlier years. Kanye West and Ludacris have since made songs with Foxx singing as Charles in their songs "Gold Digger" and "Georgia", respectively. Instead of studying Ray Charles in person, Foxx watched old video footage to authentically recreate the mannerisms of a young Ray Charles. Foxx also shot the majority of the film blind as he used prosthetics to cover his eyes.

Hackford stated that while Anschutz agreed to finance the film, he demanded that it be PG-13, which caused Hackford to walk away from the film twice. Because Charles and Ahmet Ertegun asked him to make the movie, he agreed to do the film as a PG-13 rating. The film was rated PG-13 for "depiction of drug addiction, sexuality and some thematic elements".

Hackford stated that no studio was interested in backing the movie. After it was shot independently, Universal Pictures stepped in to distribute it. Part of the reason Universal Pictures released it was because one of its executives used to hitchhike to Ray Charles concerts.

The film's score was composed by Craig Armstrong. Ray debuted at the 2004 Toronto International Film Festival.

== Reception ==
=== Box office ===
Ray was released in theaters on October 29, 2004. The film went on to become a box-office hit, earning $75 million in the U.S. with an additional $50 million internationally, bringing its worldwide gross to $125 million.

=== Critical response ===
On Rotten Tomatoes, the film holds an approval rating of 79% based on 206 reviews, with an average rating of 7.30/10. The site's critical consensus reads, "An engrossing and energetic portrait of a great musician's achievements and foibles, Ray is anchored by Jamie Foxx's stunning performance as Ray Charles." On Metacritic, the film has a weighted average score of 73 out of 100, based on 40 critics, indicating "generally favorable reviews". Audiences surveyed by CinemaScore gave the film a rare "A+" grade.

Roger Ebert of the Chicago Sun-Times wrote: "The movie would be worth seeing simply for the sound of the music and the sight of Jamie Foxx performing it. That it looks deeper and gives us a sense of the man himself is what makes it special." Ebert gave it a full 4 out of 4 stars. Richard Corliss of Time praised the cast, saying "If there were an Oscar for ensemble acting, Ray would win in a stroll." Peter Travers of Rolling Stone wrote: "Jamie Foxx gets so far inside the man and his music that he and Ray Charles seem to breathe as one."

According to music critic Robert Christgau, "Foxx does the impossible—radiates something approaching the charisma of the artist he's portraying... that's the only time an actor has ever brought a pop icon fully to life on-screen."

=== Related projects ===
In the wake of his performance as Charles in the film, Foxx featured on hip-hop songs that sampled Charles' songs:

- Georgia by Ludacris also featuring Field Mob, which samples Georgia on My Mind.
- Gold Digger by Kanye West, which samples I Got a Woman.

== Historical accuracy ==
The film's credits state that Ray is based on true events, but includes some characters, names, locations, and events which have been changed and others which have been "fictionalized for dramatization purposes." Examples of the fictionalized scenes include:

- The film's portrayal of Charles' brother George's death in 1935 shows him drowning in a metal tub after Ray does not attempt to rescue him because he assumes he is just playing; Ray's mother then discovers George drowning when calling the boys in for dinner. Though George did drown in a metal tub, Ray did try to pull him out, but was unable to do so due to George's large body weight; Ray then ran inside to tell his mother what happened.
- Throughout the film, it is suggested that Ray's depression and heroin addiction were fueled by nervous breakdowns he had over the deaths of both George and his mother, as well as his blindness. In reality, the death of his mother was a factoring cause of his nervous breakdown, and was thought to be a leading cause of his depression. However, the death of George and Charles' blindness did not lead to nervous breakdowns.
- In the film, when his backing singer and mistress Margie Hendricks informs Ray she is pregnant with his child, Ray suggests she should have an abortion, out of loyalty to Della. Margie decides to keep the baby, and soon leaves Ray to pursue a separate singing career after he refuses to abandon his family, move in with her and welcome the baby into his life. In reality, Hendricks did conceive a child with Charles and abandoned him after he refused to leave Della, but Charles never asked her to have an abortion, and welcomed any child he conceived, whether from Della or any other mistress, into his personal life.
- In the film, Margie Hendricks dies in 1964, and it was stated the death was caused by drug overdose. However, in reality she died on July 14, 1973, but no official cause of death was determined because an autopsy was not performed.
- During the final scene in the film, when Charles' version of "Georgia on My Mind" becomes Georgia's state song, Charles is congratulated by his wife Della, and a resolution is also passed to lift the lifetime ban he had received in 1961 after he declared he would no longer perform at segregated public facilities. In reality, by the time "Georgia on My Mind" became Georgia's state song in 1979, Charles and Della had already divorced, so she was not present when Charles performed at the Georgia State Legislature; and since he had never been banned from performing in Georgia in the first place, no such resolution was ever passed.
