= Steve Cantamessa =

American sound engineer

- Occupation: Sound engineer
- Years active: 1978-present

Steve Cantamessa is an American sound engineer. He won an Academy Award for Best Sound for the film Ray. He has worked on over 75 films and television shows since 1978.

== Selected filmography ==
- Ray (2004)
- Gone Girl (2014)
