= James L. White (screenwriter) =

American screenwriter

- Born: November 15, 1947; Mount Sterling, Kentucky
- Died: July 23, 2015 (aged 67); Santa Monica, California
- Occupation: Screenwriter
- Notable work: Ray (2004)
- Spouse: Elizabeth
- Children: 2 daughters, 1 son
- Awards: Satellite Award

James L. White (November 15, 1947 – July 23, 2015) was an American screenwriter best known for his original screenplay for the 2004 film Ray, a biopic on Ray Charles. For his work on Ray, White received the Satellite Award for Best Original Screenplay and a BAFTA Award nomination for Best Original Screenplay.

White was born on November 15, 1947, in Mount Sterling, Kentucky. He was raised by his single mother in Mount Sterling, approximately 35 miles east of Lexington. A love of reading led White to pursue a career as a writer. He served in the U.S. Navy before enrolling at the University of Massachusetts. He left the university after a year and worked a series of jobs in the Boston area. He moved to Los Angeles during the 1970s to pursue screenwriting.

White credited his friend, actor Sidney Poitier, with helping in get his first screenwriting job. Poitier hired White in 1992 to write the screenplay for a thriller called Red Money. The film was never made, but it marked White's breakthrough into screenwriting after decades of attempts. In a 2005 award acceptance speech before the Friends of the Black Oscar Nominees group, White thanked Poitier: "I would like to publicly thank Mr. Poitier, who was the first person in Hollywood to take a chance on me as a screenwriter."

White was working on two screenplays at the time of his death in 2015 – a biopic on Bessie Smith titled Empress of the Blues, and a film focusing on Dinah Washington, which is in pre-production.

White died from complications of liver and pancreatic cancer at his home in Santa Monica, California, on July 23, 2015, at the age of 67. He had a wife, Elizabeth, two daughters and a son.
