= Field Mob =

American hip hop duo

- Origin: Albany, Georgia, U.S.
- Genres: Hip-hop
- Years active: 1999–2011
- Labels: MCA; DTP; Geffen
- Members: Smoke; Shawn Jay

Field Mob was an American hip-hop duo from Albany, Georgia, composed of artists Darion "Smoke" Crawford and Shawn Timothy "Shawn Jay" Johnson. They have not been actively releasing music together since 2011 when they were dropped from the Disturbing Tha Peace record label.

== History ==
=== Formation ===
Darion and Shawn grew up on the outskirts of Albany a few blocks from each other in a relatively poor neighborhood locally known as "The Field" because of its semi-rural location as compared to the city's public housing. As teenagers attending Monroe Comprehensive High School, Darion observed Shawn and a group of friends holding rap freestyle battles in the schools courtyard, with Shawn being the "reigning champion." Darion decided to challenge Shawn on the idea that "he was just as good" and won. For four weeks afterward, the informal competition continued daily, with the victor alternating between himself and Shawn, and attracting the attention of many other students who came to spectate. Eventually, Shawn offered to form a rap group with Darion, and Field Mob was born.

According to Smoke and Shawn Jay, the origins of the duo's name are twofold. Field is a reference not only to the neighborhood where they grew up, but also an allusion to a slang term for the southern United States. Mob signifies the strength the duo represents: "We're two people but together we make an army. We're making a strong statement with two people. We're a two man army."

=== MCA ===
Late in 1999, after floundering for some time in the local music scene, Field Mob was signed to Southern House Records, a small independent label, recording the single "Project Dreamz". The group then set out on the road to promote their new release during a time when the southern hip hop scene was on the rise. The single eventually drew the attention of MCA Records Benny Pough and within days Field Mob signed a deal.

==== 613: Ashy to Classy ====
December 2000 saw the release of Field Mob's debut 613: Ashy to Classy. Introduced to much critical acclaim and hailed by some hip hop press outlets, most notably The Source, as one of the best albums of 2001, it reached number 35 on the Top R&B/Hip Hop Albums. Following their debut success, the duo's collaboration was sought after by several well-known regional artists, including Trick Daddy and Outkast member Big Boi, lending further public exposure and notoriety.

==== From tha Roota to tha Toota ====
In October 2002, the group's second album From tha Roota to tha Toota was released. While some reviews were mixed, the album sold well, becoming certified gold and garnering the group their second largest hit to date (as of 9/07) with the Jazze Pha–produced single "Sick of Being Lonely" (released July 3, 2003).

=== Disturbing tha Peace ===
As Field Mob's career seemed to be accelerating, Universal Music Group, MCA Records parent, began to phase out the label in the spring of 2003, with the former company's rock, pop, and urban catalogs absorbed into Geffen Records. This action left the future of the duo's contract and any subsequent album releases in doubt. It appeared that Field Mob and their deep south influence may fade from the hip hop scene at large.

However, the situation came to the attention of Disturbing tha Peace CEO Ludacris, who saw untapped potential in the young rappers. After negotiations, which involved relieving them of their old MCA contract, the group was signed to Disturbing tha Peace in August 2005, shortly thereafter appearing on Ludacris Presents: Disturbing tha Peace, a collaboration album showcasing the label's new artists. The duo's track "Georgia" with Ludacris became an instant underground hit and the albums top-selling single, eventually reaching #39 on the US Billboard 200 and setting the tone for their third album.

==== Light Poles and Pine Trees ====
After a postponed 2005 release date, Light Poles and Pine Trees dropped in June 2006 to high acclaim and much fanfare, owing at least partly from an extensive promotional campaign by Disturbing tha Peace and multiple radio promo tracks. This album garnered the pair their biggest hit with its first official single, "So What", featuring Ciara and coincidentally also produced by Jazze Pha. This release reached number 7 on the US Billboard 200 and number 2 on Top R&B/Hip Hop Albums.

The group's increased success since signing with Disturbing tha Peace was largely attributed to better promotion by their new label and, most importantly, the artistic freedom that the group has been allowed in their new home. Darian related this sentiment in an interview for SOHH.com:

I went free with my creativity [at DTP, unlike when] I was over at MCA, aka rape you records. Ludacris let me say what I wanna say. If I wanna say f**k..., he's cool with it cause he trusts my creativity. I never knew our CEO at MCA Records. I never got to talk to him. ... [Ludacris and I] are friends more than business partners, I'd like to say.

=== After DTP ===
The group eventually left Disturbing tha Peace Records when, late 2011, Shawn Jay felt disrespected by a song Ludacris produced for his mixtape 1.21 Gigawatts: Back To The First Time which spawned a dispute between the two former label mates. Shawn Jay responded with the diss tracks "P*ssy Boy (Ludacris Diss)" and "Stack a Million (Ludacris Diss)".

== Controversy ==
In April 2006 a controversial video leaked on the internet appeared to feature Smoke and Shawn Jay disrespecting New York rappers and challenging the likes of Jay-Z and Nas to rap battles. This video turned out to have been filmed and produced by a Disturbing tha Peace cameraman who had subsequently been terminated by the label. In attempt to slander Field Mob, he had edited various pieces of footage together, bringing them totally out of context. The most inflammatory footage, of the pair poking fun at New York slang, was confirmed by Smoke to be a friendly joke toward Disturbing tha Peace co-CEO's, executives, and Harlem natives Chaka Zulu and his brother Jeff Dixon. Furthermore, though the footage was edited to cast a negative light, Smoke points out that "[New York artists] do [Southern artists] like that all the time, but nobody says nothing about it..."

== Solo projects ==
As of spring 2008 Smoke has signed a record deal with the Phoenix Arizona-based indie label Mpire Records, under the Chevy P moniker. A new album, Caprice Classics, was scheduled for release in 2009 but has since been shelved. The music video for this album's pre-release single, "So Lonely" produced by Scott Storch, however did receive heavy rotation on BET as well as being featured on several video sharing and hip hop websites.

== Discography ==
=== Studio albums ===
Title	Album details	Peak chart positions	
Title	Album details	US	US R&B
613: Ashy to Classy	Released: December 12, 2000; Label: MCA; Format: CD, LP, cassette, digital download	194	35
From tha Roota to tha Toota	Released: October 22, 2002; Label: MCA; Format: CD, LP, digital download	33	4
Light Poles and Pine Trees	Released: June 20, 2006; Label: DTP, Geffen; Format: CD, LP, digital download	7	2

=== Singles ===
Year	Song	Peak chart positions					Album
Year	Song	U.S.	U.S. R&B	U.S. Rap	U.S. Pop	AUS	Album
2000	"Project Dreams"	—	91	—	—	—	613: Ashy to Classy
2002	"Sick of Being Lonely"	18	10	5	—	—	From tha Roota to tha Toota
2003	"All I Know" (featuring CeeLo Green)	—	77	—	—	—	From tha Roota to tha Toota
2005	"My Wheels"	—	—	—	—	—	Light Poles and Pine Trees
2005	"Friday Night"	—	—	—	—	—	Light Poles and Pine Trees
2005	"Georgia" (featuring Ludacris and Jamie Foxx)	39	31	21	36	—	Light Poles and Pine Trees
2006	"So What" (featuring Ciara)	10	4	3	13	40	Light Poles and Pine Trees

=== Guest appearances ===
Title	Year	Artist(s)	Album
"Jazzy Hoe's Part 2"	2001	Jermaine Dupri (feat. Kurupt, Too Short, Field Mob, Backbone and Eddie Cain)	Instructions
"Ultimate Satisfaction"	2006	Ludacris (feat. Field Mob)	Release Therapy
