= Boston Society of Film Critics Award for Best Screenplay =

Annual US film award

The Boston Society of Film Critics Award for Best Screenplay is one of the annual film awards given by the Boston Society of Film Critics.

== Winners ==
=== 1980s ===
- 1980: Melvin and Howard

written by Bo Goldman

- 1981: My Dinner with Andre

written by Andre Gregory and Wallace Shawn

- 1982: Diner

written by Barry Levinson

- 1983: Pauline à la plage (Pauline at the Beach)

written by Éric Rohmer

- 1984: Repo Man

written by Alex Cox

- 1985: The Purple Rose of Cairo

written by Woody Allen

- 1986: Hannah and Her Sisters

written by Woody Allen

- 1987: Broadcast News

written by James L. Brooks

- 1988: Bull Durham

written by Ron Shelton

- 1989: Crimes and Misdemeanors

written by Woody Allen

=== 1990s ===
- 1990: Reversal of Fortune

written by Nicholas Kazan

- 1991: Naked Lunch

written by David Cronenberg

- 1992: The Crying Game

written by Neil Jordan

- 1993: Short Cuts

written by Robert Altman and Frank Barhydt

- 1994: Pulp Fiction

written by Roger Avary and Quentin Tarantino

- 1995: Sense and Sensibility

written by Emma Thompson

- 1996: Big Night

written by Joseph Tropiano and Stanley Tucci

- 1997: L.A. Confidential

written by Curtis Hanson and Brian Helgeland

- 1998: Out of Sight

written by Scott Frank

- 1999: Being John Malkovich

written by Charlie Kaufman

=== 2000s ===
Year	Winner	Writer(s)	Source
2000	Almost Famous	Cameron Crowe	—
2000	Wonder Boys	Steve Kloves	novel by Michael Chabon
2001	Memento	Christopher Nolan	short story by Jonathan Nolan
2002	Adaptation.	Charlie and Donald Kaufman	novel by Susan Orlean
2003	American Splendor	Shari Springer Berman and Robert Pulcini	graphic novel by Joyce Brabner & Harvey Pekar comic book series by Harvey Pekar
2004	Sideways	Alexander Payne and Jim Taylor	novel by Rex Pickett
2005	Capote	Dan Futterman	book by Gerald Clarke
2006	The Departed	William Monahan	film by Siu Fai Mak and Felix Chong
2007	Ratatouille	Brad Bird	—
2008	Milk	Dustin Lance Black	—
2009	A Serious Man	Joel Coen and Ethan Coen	—

=== 2010s ===
Year	Winner	Writer(s)	Source
2010	The Social Network	Aaron Sorkin	novel by Ben Mezrich
2011	Moneyball	Steven Zaillian and Aaron Sorkin	novel by Michael Lewis
2012	Lincoln	Tony Kushner	novel by Doris Kearns Goodwin
2013	Enough Said	Nicole Holofcener	—
2014	Birdman	Alejandro G. Iñárritu, Nicolás Giacobone, Alexander Dinelaris Jr., and Armando Bo	—
2014	Boyhood	Richard Linklater	—
2015	Spotlight	Tom McCarthy and Josh Singer	—
2016	Manchester by the Sea	Kenneth Lonergan	—
2017	Lady Bird	Greta Gerwig	—
2018	Can You Ever Forgive Me?	Nicole Holofcener and Jeff Whitty	memoir by Lee Israel
2019	Once Upon a Time in Hollywood	Quentin Tarantino	—

=== 2020s ===
Year	Winner	Writer(s)	Source
2020	I'm Thinking of Ending Things	Charlie Kaufman	novel by Iain Reid
2021	Drive My Car	Ryusuke Hamaguchi and Takamasa Oe	Men Without Women by Haruki Murakami
2022	Original Screenplay: The Banshees of Inisherin	Martin McDonagh	—
2022	Adapted Screenplay: After Yang	Kogonada	short story "Saying Goodbye to Yang" by Alexander Weinstein
2023	Original Screenplay: The Holdovers	David Hemingson	—
2023	Adapted Screenplay: The Zone of Interest	Jonathan Glazer	The Zone of Interest by Martin Amis
2024	Original Screenplay: Anora	Sean Baker	—
2024	Adapted Screenplay: Nickel Boys	RaMell Ross and Joslyn Barnes	The Nickel Boys by Colson Whitehead
2025	Original Screenplay: Blue Moon	Robert Kaplow	—
2025	Adapted Screenplay: One Battle After Another	Paul Thomas Anderson	Vineland by Thomas Pynchon
