= Sideways (musical) =

Musical based on the novel of the same name

- Music: Anthony Leigh Adams
- Lyrics: Anthony Leigh Adams; Rex Pickett
- Book: Rex Pickett
- Basis: Sideways; By: Rex Pickett
- Productions: 2021 Sonoma

Sideways is a stage musical with a book by Rex Pickett and music by Anthony Leigh Adams with a lyrics by Pickett and Adams. The show is based on the novel of the same name by Pickett, which he also adapted as a straight play. The novel was the basis of a 2004 film of the same name by Alexander Payne and Jim Taylor.

The show is set in California wine country in Santa Ynez Valley and follows Miles Raymond, a down on his luck writer that lives in Santa Monica. Raymond and a friend, Jack, head off on a road trip to the countryside that turns into a journey of self discovery.

== Production history ==
After several years of development, the show was set for a regional premiere in 2020, directed and choreographed by Kathleen Marshall. Due to the COVID-19 pandemic, these plans were cancelled. Pickett and Adams decided to stage the musical at a local stage in same area the show is based in at the Buena Vista Winery in Sonoma, with future productions expected in the future. An original cast album was recorded with the same cast from this performance. Performers included Ryan Quinn, Ruby Lewis, James Byous, Emily Goglia, Juliette Goglia, Devin Archer, Rebecca Jade, Britton Sparkman.

== Musical numbers ==
- "God Of The Grape"
- "There Is Hope"
- "Hittin' The Road"
- "Cheap Champagne"
- "The Life Of Wine"
- "Stomping The Grapes"
- "No Matter How Low We Go"
- "Alone"
- "Infidelity"
- "Drink A Memory"
- "New Day"
- "You're Not The One"
- "Locked And Loaded"
- "The Joke's On You"
- "Without A Man"
- "On The Ropes"
- "Drink A Memory (reprise)"
- "The Life of Wine (reprise)"
- "Baccanal"

An original cast album was recorded and released and is available from Broadway Records.
