= List of awards and nominations received by Charlie Kaufman =

Charlie Kaufman
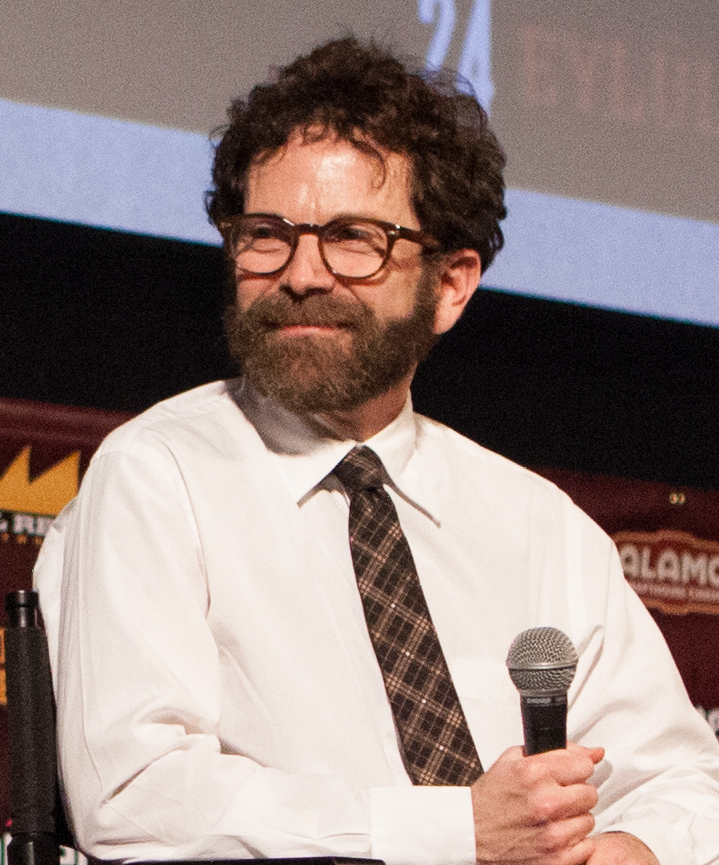
- Kaufman at the 2015 Fantastic Fest
- Born: Charles Stuart Kaufman; November 19, 1958 (age 67); New York City, New York, U.S.
- Education: New York University
- Occupations: Screenwriter; producer; director; novelist
- Years active: 1983–present

Charles Stuart Kaufman (/ˈkɔːfmən/; born November 19, 1958) is an American screenwriter, producer, director and novelist. He wrote the films Being John Malkovich (1999), Adaptation (2002), and Eternal Sunshine of the Spotless Mind (2004). He made his directorial debut with Synecdoche, New York (2008), which film critic Roger Ebert called "the best movie of the decade" in 2009. Further directorial work include the stop motion animated film Anomalisa (2015) and I'm Thinking of Ending Things (2020).

One of the most celebrated screenwriters of his era, Kaufman has been nominated for four Academy Awards: twice for Best Original Screenplay for Being John Malkovich and Eternal Sunshine of the Spotless Mind (winning for the latter), Best Adapted Screenplay (with his fictional brother) for Adaptation, and Best Animated Feature for Anomalisa. He also won two BAFTA Award for Best Original Screenplays and one BAFTA Award for Best Adapted Screenplay. Three of Kaufman's scripts appear in the Writers Guild of America's list of the 101 greatest movie screenplays ever written.

== Major associations ==
=== Academy Awards ===
Year	Category	Nominated work	Result	Ref.
1999	Best Original Screenplay	Being John Malkovich	Nominated	
2002	Best Adapted Screenplay	Adaptation	Nominated	
2004	Best Original Screenplay	Eternal Sunshine of the Spotless Mind	Won	
2015	Best Animated Feature	Anomalisa	Nominated	

=== British Academy Film Awards ===
Year	Category	Nominated work	Result	Ref.
1999	Best Original Screenplay	Being John Malkovich	Won	
2002	Best Adapted Screenplay	Adaptation	Won	
2004	Best Original Screenplay	Eternal Sunshine of the Spotless Mind	Won	

=== Children's and Family Emmy Awards ===
Year	Category	Nominated work	Result	Ref.
2024	Outstanding Animated Special	Orion and the Dark	Won	

=== Golden Globe Awards ===
Year	Category	Nominated work	Result	Ref.
1999	Best Screenplay	Being John Malkovich	Nominated	
2002	Best Screenplay	Adaptation	Nominated	
2004	Best Screenplay	Eternal Sunshine of the Spotless Mind	Nominated	

=== Independent Spirit Awards ===
Year	Category	Nominated work	Result	Ref.
1999	Best First Screenplay	Being John Malkovich	Won	
2008	Best First Feature	Synecdoche, New York	Won	
2008	Best Screenplay	Synecdoche, New York	Nominated	
2015	Best Film	Anomalisa	Nominated	
2015	Best Director	Anomalisa	Nominated	
2015	Best Screenplay	Anomalisa	Nominated	

=== Writers Guild of America ===
Year	Category	Nominated work	Result	Ref.
1999	Best Original Screenplay	Being John Malkovich	Nominated	
2002	Best Adapted Screenplay	Adaptation	Nominated	
2004	Best Original Screenplay	Eternal Sunshine of the Spotless Mind	Won	

== Festival awards ==
=== Cannes Film Festival ===
Year	Category	Nominated work	Result
2008	Palme d'Or	Synecdoche, New York	Nominated
2008	Caméra d'Or	Synecdoche, New York	Nominated

=== Venice Film Festival ===
Year	Category	Nominated work	Result
2015	Grand Jury Prize	Anomalisa	Won
2015	Golden Lion	Anomalisa	Nominated

== Critics awards ==
=== Boston Society of Film Critics ===
Year	Category	Nominated work	Result
1999	Best Screenplay	Being John Malkovich	Won
2002	Best Screenplay	Adaptation	Won
2004	Best Screenplay	Eternal Sunshine of the Spotless Mind	Nominated
2020	Best Screenplay	I'm Thinking of Ending Things	Won

=== Chicago Film Critics Association ===
Year	Category	Nominated work	Result
1999	Best Original Screenplay	Being John Malkovich	Won
2002	Best Adapted Screenplay	Adaptation	Won
2008	Best Original Screenplay	Synecdoche, New York	Nominated
2015	Best Adapted Screenplay	Anomalisa	Nominated
2020	Best Adapted Screenplay	I'm Thinking of Ending Things	Nominated

=== Critics' Choice Movie Awards ===
Year	Category	Nominated work	Result
2002	Best Screenplay	Adaptation	Won
2002	Best Screenplay	Confessions of a Dangerous Mind	Won
2004	Best Screenplay	Eternal Sunshine of the Spotless Mind	Nominated
2015	Best Animated Feature	Anomalisa	Nominated

=== Florida Film Critics Circle Award ===
Year	Category	Nominated work	Result
2002	Best Screenplay	Adaptation	Won
2020	Best Adapted Screenplay	I'm Thinking of Ending Things	Won

=== London Film Critics' Circle Award ===
Year	Category	Nominated work	Result
2004	Screenwriter of the Year	Eternal Sunshine of the Spotless Mind	Won

=== Los Angeles Film Critics Association ===
Year	Category	Nominated work	Result
1999	Best Screenplay	Being John Malkovich	Won
2004	Best Screenplay	Eternal Sunshine of the Spotless Mind	Nominated
2008	Best Screenplay	Synecdoche, New York	Nominated

=== National Board of Review ===
Year	Category	Nominated work	Result
2001	Best Screenplay	Human Nature	Won
2002	Best Screenplay	Adaptation	Won
2002	Best Screenplay	Confessions of a Dangerous Mind	Won
2004	Best Screenplay	Eternal Sunshine of the Spotless Mind	Won

=== National Society of Film Critics ===
Year	Category	Nominated work	Result
1999	Best Screenplay	Being John Malkovich	Won
2004	Best Screenplay	Eternal Sunshine of the Spotless Mind	Nominated
2008	Best Screenplay	Synecdoche, New York	Nominated
2015	Best Screenplay	Anomalisa	Nominated
2020	Best Screenplay	I'm Thinking of Ending Things	Nominated

=== New York Film Critics Circle Awards ===
Year	Category	Nominated work	Result
2002	Best Screenplay	Adaptation	Won
2004	Best Screenplay	Eternal Sunshine of the Spotless Mind	Won

=== Online Film Critics Society ===
Year	Category	Nominated work	Result
2002	Best Adapted Screenplay	Adaptation	Won
2004	Best Original Screenplay	Eternal Sunshine of the Spotless Mind	Won
2008	Best Original Screenplay	Synecdoche, New York	Nominated

=== San Diego Film Critics Society ===
Year	Category	Nominated work	Result
1999	Best Original Screenplay	Being John Malkovich	Won
2002	Best Adapted Screenplay	Adaptation	Won
2020	Best Adapted Screenplay	I'm Thinking of Ending Things	Nominated

=== Toronto Film Critics Association ===
Year	Category	Nominated work	Result
1999	Best Screenplay	Being John Malkovich	Won
2004	Best Screenplay	Eternal Sunshine of the Spotless Mind	Won

=== Vancouver Film Critics Circle ===
Year	Category	Nominated work	Result
2015	Best Screenplay	Anomalisa	Won

=== Washington D.C. Critics Association ===
Year	Category	Nominated work	Result
2004	Best Original Screenplay	Eternal Sunshine of the Spotless Mind	Won

== Miscellaneous awards ==
Year	Award	Category	Nominated work	Result
1999	Saturn Awards	Best Writing	Being John Malkovich	Won
2004	Saturn Awards	Best Writing	Eternal Sunshine of the Spotless Mind	Nominated
2015	Saturn Awards	Best Animated Film	Anomalisa	Nominated
2015	Producers Guild of America Award	Outstanding Animated Motion Picture	Anomalisa	Nominated
2015	Annie Award	Directing in a Feature Production	Anomalisa	Nominated
2024	Annie Award	Writing in an Animated Television / Broadcast Production	Orion and the Dark	Won
2024	Children's and Family Emmy Awards	Outstanding Animated Special	Orion and the Dark	Won
