= Linda Mancini =

Linda Mancini is a Canadian-American writer, actor, and Bessie Award winning performance artist. Her short film, This Is Not About You, was screened nationally on the PBS anthology series, American Playhouse. In 1999, Mancini appeared in the short film, My Mother Dreams the Satan's Disciples in New York (by Rex Pickett, author of Sideways), which won an Academy Award for Best Short Subject in 2000.
