= We Spread =

2022 novel by Iain Reid

- First edition cover
- Author: Iain Reid
- Cover artist: Chelsea McGuckin
- Language: English
- Genres: Psychological thriller; horror; literary fiction
- Publisher: Simon & Schuster
- Publication date: September 27, 2022
- Publication place: United States
- Pages: 304 (hardback)
- ISBN: 978-1-982169-35-0
- Dewey Decimal: 813/.6—dc23
- LC Class: PS8635.E399 W4 2022

We Spread is a 2022 literary novel by Canadian writer Iain Reid. It was published in the United States on September 27, 2022, by Scout Press, and in the United Kingdom on September 29, 2022, by Scribner UK, both imprints of Simon & Schuster. The book has been described as a psychological thriller and horror fiction, and is about an elderly woman living in an assisted living facility where all is not as it appears.

== Plot summary ==
Penny is an elderly woman living on her own in an apartment. She once shared it with her partner, a professional painter, but when he died, she elected to remain to hold onto her memories of him. Penny was a painter herself and dabbled in surrealism, but never showed her work. She is determined to manage on her own and rejects all offers of help. One day she falls and hurts herself, and her landlord takes her to an assisted living facility called Six Cedars. When she questions his decision to take her there, he tells her that she and her partner had decided that Six Cedars would be where they would go when they needed help. Penny has no memory of that arrangement.

Six Cedars is an 1843 mansion set in a forest, but it has only three other elderly patients and two helpers. Initially Penny resists being uprooted, but soon is surprised at how quickly she starts to enjoy her new home. She eats well, sleeps better than she has in years, and enjoys the company of the other residents. But after a while it all seems too good to be true and Penny begins to observe strange things. The passage of time becomes distorted and her memories start to fragment. No one is allowed to go outside the house, and its corridors seem to change shape from time to time. Even her fellow companions appear to change, and Penny begins to suspect that the facility's director has sinister motives.

== Background ==
We Spread originally began as a screenplay. Reid said that while working on the screenplay for the film adaptation of his previous novel, Foe, an idea for a new story came to mind. "It didn’t feel like a novel, it was very visual. I tried it as an exercise." The resulting screenplay impressed one of the producers of Foe, but Reid started becoming "obsessed with exploring these characters in a literary realm", and he ended up turning the screenplay into a novel.

Reid explained that We Spread is not about dementia, and "it's not even clear whether or not Penny has dementia. We are seeing ... things through Penny's lens as an artist ... that is the filter through which she sees the world." Readers have to decide for themselves what is going on. Reid said, "I know what I think, but I won't tell anyone what it is. I want people to make their own interpretations."

We Spread dwells on the elderly, and Reid's contact with his grandmother was influential in the development of the story. She had been moved to a long-term-care facility, and Reid visited her often. He said he became very familiar with "that world", and "felt very grateful to the people who worked there. They were wonderful." Six Cedars is very different from the place Reid visited, but he said he hopes We Spread will make people more aware of the elderly in society. Reid remarked, "We have such a cultural fear of life at that stage and of dying when maybe we shouldn't feel that way".

The cover of We Spread was designed by Chelsea McGuckin. She said:

This book deserved something both beautiful and haunting for its cover, just like Iain’s writing ... Our editor emphasized the importance of feeling the words and roots spreading. I wanted someone to pick this up and think, ‘Is something nefarious going on, or am I just imagining it?’ It needed to toe the line between creepy and elegant, and as the design process went on it became clear that a relatively simple, type-driven cover was the best way to achieve that.

Reid was very impressed with the cover and remarked:

Whatever hazy possibilities or speculations I had running through my mind were immediately (and willingly) dashed after seeing Chelsea’s striking design. There’s so much to like and admire about it. It’s both specific and still open to interpretation. I don’t think there is one correct way to interpret this cover, and I would say that fits the story.

== Reception ==
In a starred review, Publishers Weekly called We Spread an "exquisite novel of psychological suspense". While Penny's unreliable narration leaves many unanswered questions, the reviewer felt the novel still "feels complete", and concluded that its exploration of "fears about growing old and losing control is unforgettable."

Writing in the Toronto Star, Steven W. Beattie said the fragmented, sparse text of We Spread mirrors Penny's surrealist and disjointed style of painting, while the book's large chunks of white space are analogous to her memory loss and confusion. Beattie opined that "on a thematic level, the overlap between surrealism and the discontinuity of creeping dementia is nicely subtle and understated." He added that despite the book's exploration of "heady" topics like aging and mortality, it "never feels lugubrious or preachy".

In another starred review in Quill & Quire, Robert J. Wiersema wrote that We Spread is "powerful and puzzling", reminiscent of Robert Aickman's short story, "The Hospice", which has a similar "dreamlike narrative" and setting. Wiersema said Penny's "fragility and uncertainty" makes the narrative unstable, which is emphasized by Reid's use of poetry-like line breaks. While it is never clear whether what Penny is experiencing is because of her declining faculties, or if there really is something strange about the house, Wiersema stated that We Spread is not a mystery to be solved, it is an experience in itself. He added that this is "a powerful approach to storytelling, and a courageous one: to commit to ambiguity requires a leap of faith on the part of the reader, and a trust in the writer."

Kirkus Reviews was a little more critical of We Spread. It said the story is "creepy", but not very subtle. Besides Penny, the other characters "function more as props", and speak "ominous[ly]" to "hammer home the point that things aren’t quite right in the facility". The review stated, "the novel has the tone of a horror movie directed by someone desperately afraid the audience is going to miss the point." It concluded that Reid's previous novels were "taut, original thrillers", but "[We Spread] is not one of them."

The novel was shortlisted for the Governor General's Award for English-language fiction at the 2023 Governor General's Awards.

== Film adaptation ==
In February 2022, seven months before We Spread was published, Anonymous Content acquired the film rights for the novel. The film will be directed by Minhal Baig and produced by Kerry Kohansky Roberts. Baig and Reid will co-write the film's screenplay.
