= Love of Your Life (film) =

2026 film by Rachel Morrison

- Promotional poster
- Directed by: Rachel Morrison
- Screenplay by: Julia Cox
- Produced by: Ryan Gosling; Jessie Henderson
- Starring: Margaret Qualley; Aaron Pierre; Patrick Schwarzenegger; Gabriel Basso; Catherine Keener
- Cinematography: Todd Banhazl
- Edited by: Jennifer Vecchiarello
- Music by: Dustin O'Halloran
- Production company: Open Invite Entertainment
- Distributed by: Amazon MGM Studios (Note: Released through the Metro-Goldwyn-Mayer banner.)
- Release dates: September 13, 2026 (TIFF); October 7, 2026 (United States)
- Running time: 106 minutes
- Country: United States
- Language: English

Love of Your Life is a 2026 American romantic drama film directed by Rachel Morrison, from a script by Julia Cox. It stars Margaret Qualley, Aaron Pierre, Patrick Schwarzenegger, Gabriel Basso, and Catherine Keener. It is produced by Ryan Gosling and Jessie Henderson.

It had its world premiere at the 2026 Toronto International Film Festival on September 13, and it was released on October 7, by Amazon MGM Studios, followed by its global streaming release on Amazon Prime Video on October 14. It received generally positive reviews from critics.

== Plot ==
At age twenty-six, Maya is a young nurse in Boston who is estranged from her single mother. She falls in love with Charlie after buying an antique drawer from him. Shortly after they begin dating, Maya introduces Charlie to Jason, her best friend since college. Jason is good-natured, but flaky and irresponsible, and frequently spends time with the couple. A year into their relationship, Charlie introduces Maya to his family on Cape Cod, and she quickly befriends his mother Ruth. During a monsoon on Charlie's thirtieth birthday, the couple marry in a small ceremony at their home.

At the onset of the COVID-19 pandemic, Maya becomes overworked and exhausted due to long hours and hospital shortages. Charlie remains supportive of her, but soon contracts COVID himself. At a high risk due to his asthma, he slowly succumbs to the virus and gets sent to the hospital; Maya, unable to get into the building, can only console him through FaceTime as he dies. After Charlie's death, Maya shuts herself in their home and withdraws from Ruth.

Three years later, Maya is thirty-one and living alone in Lisbon, where she and Charlie had wanted to travel together. Supporting herself through a telehealth job, she has grown despondent due to Charlie's death and spends her nights drinking and having one-night stands. She meets Felix, a charming British divorcé with a young daughter, at a restaurant she frequents and they spend the night together. Encouraged by her therapist to find a new hobby unrelated to Charlie, Maya goes to a dance class and befriends a woman named Beatriz, who implores her not to stay unhappy. She seeks out Felix again and begins a relationship with him, accompanying him to a seaside trip and then back to London. While out on a date, Maya unexpectedly encounters Jason, but rejects his attempts to reconcile. She and Felix decide to commit to a serious relationship and she moves in with him, eventually meeting his daughter Noelle. At Noelle's sixth birthday party, Maya becomes uncomfortable with his closeness towards his family. Feeling like an intruder into his life, she breaks up with him and flees to Tokyo for several months.

At age thirty-two, Maya returns to London and meets Felix again at a cafe, where he informs that he has gotten back together with his ex-wife. She and Felix part on amicable terms. At age thirty-four, Maya now lives in Luxembourg. Travelling to New Orleans, she speaks at a public health conference and reconnects with Jason. She finds that he has matured significantly since she last saw him and they rekindle their friendship. Jason drops Maya off at the airport, but she changes her mind about going home and instead goes to the Cape, where she reconnects with Ruth. After reminiscing over her grief for Charlie and Maya's absence, Ruth tells her that she must love her life first and foremost. While in the car ride back to Boston, Maya breaks down into tears. Now back in Boston, Maya listens to an old cassette tape Charlie gave her as it fades into white noise. She takes her headphones off, looks over at the Longfellow Bridge, and smiles.

== Cast ==
- Margaret Qualley as Maya
- Aaron Pierre as Felix
- Patrick Schwarzenegger as Jason
- Gabriel Basso as Charlie
- Catherine Keener as Ruth
- Tamara Lawrance as Kali
- Corey Johnson as Kerry

== Production ==
=== Development ===
The film rights for the script by Julia Cox were purchased by Amazon MGM Studios in October 2024 with Ryan Gosling attached to produce with producing partner Jessie Henderson at Open Invite Entertainment. In March 2025, Rachel Morrison joined the project as director.

Dustin O'Halloran was hired to compose the score for the film.

=== Casting ===
Margaret Qualley was reported to be leading the cast in May 2025 and was confirmed to be joined by Patrick Schwarzenegger the following month. They were later joined in the cast by Aaron Pierre, Gabriel Basso and Catherine Keener.

=== Filming ===
Principal photography was underway in August 2025, with filming scheduled for across Europe, and wrapped on October 26. One of the filming locations was in Lisbon, Portugal. The film was also shot on location in several parts of the Boston area including Boston, Cambridge, Lexington, Concord and at Mount Auburn Cemetery in Watertown. Additional location filming in the US was done in New Orleans.

== Release ==
It had its world premiere at the 2026 Toronto International Film Festival on September 13, 2026, and it was released in the United States on October 7, 2026, and on Amazon Prime Video on October 14.

== Reception ==
On review aggregator Rotten Tomatoes, the film holds an approval rating of 79% based on 58 reviews, with an average rating of 6.9/10. The website's consensus reads: "A winsome travelogue enlivened by Margaret Qualley's terrific performance, Love of Your Life is an attractive drama that finds the grace notes in heartbreak." Metacritic, which uses a weighted average, assigned the film a score of 62 out of 100, based on 14 critics.
