= Sideways Series =

Novel series by Rex Pickett

- Sideways; Vertical; Sideways 3 Chile; Sideways New Zealand
- Author: Rex Pickett
- Country: United States
- Language: English
- Genre: Fiction, comedy
- Publisher: St. Martin's Griffin
- Published: 2004, 2010, 2015, 2024
- No. of books: 4

The Sideways Series is a collection of comedic wine themed novels by Rex Pickett which include Sideways, which was the basis of a 2004 film directed by Alexander Payne, Vertical, Sideways 3 Chile and Sideways New Zealand.

== Overview ==
The series spans approximately eight years in the life of its main protagonist, a writer named Miles. At the beginning of Sideways, Miles is a mostly unsuccessful screenwriter and functioning alcoholic who is taking his best friend Jack, a successful TV director, on a trip to California's wine country the week before the latter's wedding. Vertical takes place seven years later, during which time Miles has found literary success with the publication of a novel based on the adventures he and Jack experienced in the trilogy's preceding installment. Jack, on the other hand, has seen his fortunes decline following a divorce and an increasing alcohol problem. Sideways 3 Chile picks up about one year later, and features Miles taking a trip to Chile to research an article for a wine magazine.

== Novels ==
- Sideways (2004)
- Vertical (2010)
- Sideways 3 Chile (2015)
- Sideways New Zealand (2024)

== Stage and musical adaptions ==
In 2019, it was announced that Sideways was scheduled to be adapted for a Broadway musical. A play adapted by author Rex Pickett from the Sideways novel was produced at multiple theaters in the United States and the United Kingdom, including at the La Jolla Playhouse.

In addition to the musical, it was reported that Rex Pickett had written screenplays based on his two Sideways sequels already in print, Vertical and Sideways 3 Chile.
