= Foe (film) =

2023 film by Garth Davis

- Theatrical release poster
- Directed by: Garth Davis
- Screenplay by: Iain Reid; Garth Davis
- Based on: Foe by Iain Reid
- Produced by: Kerry Kohansky-Roberts; Garth Davis; Emile Sherman; Iain Canning
- Starring: Saoirse Ronan; Paul Mescal; Aaron Pierre
- Cinematography: Mátyás Erdély
- Edited by: Peter Sciberras
- Music by: Park Jiha; Oliver Coates; Agnes Obel
- Production companies: Anonymous Content; See-Saw Films; I Am That Productions
- Distributed by: Amazon MGM Studios (United States); Transmission Films (Australia)
- Release dates: September 30, 2023 (NYFF); October 6, 2023 (United States); November 2, 2023 (Australia)
- Running time: 110 minutes
- Countries: Australia; United States
- Language: English

Foe is a 2023 psychological science fiction film, directed by Garth Davis, from a screenplay he co-wrote with Iain Reid, based on Reid's 2018 novel. Starring Saoirse Ronan, Paul Mescal, and Aaron Pierre, it concerns a young couple, Hen and Junior, having marital issues when Junior is called to serve on a space station. It is an international co-production of Australia and the United States.

Foe premiered at the New York Film Festival on September 30, 2023. It was released in the United States by Amazon MGM Studios on October 6 and in Australia by Transmission Films on November 2. Foe received largely negative reviews from film critics.

== Plot ==
In the near future, Junior lives with his wife Henrietta 'Hen' on a remote farm. One night a stranger appears at their door who introduces himself as Terrance from an aerospace corporation called OuterMore. Terrance announces that Junior has been drafted to work on the Installation, a large space station in orbit around Earth. He will remain there for about two years before returning home. Although there are signs that Hen is deeply unhappy, Junior is very protective of Hen and likes the routine of their life together. He is not happy about leaving Hen alone for so long. Terrance reassures Junior that while he is gone, he will be replaced by a biomechanical duplicate of himself that will keep Hen company. Junior is horrified at the concept, but ultimately has no choice, as the government has mandated that all those selected for participation in the Installation must go. Terrance begins to visit the farm house regularly to interview Junior and collect data to help configure his replacement.

Relations between Junior and Hen become more visibly strained after Terrance’s first visit. After a brief period of tension, Junior expresses to Hen that he wants to work on their relationship, and she agrees. The couple becomes more spontaneous, affectionate, and caring towards each other. As they grow more in love, Junior begins to resent Terrance's frequent visits.

After about two years, Terrance moves in with them full-time so he can monitor Junior's daily routine. During his extended stay, Terrance also spends time interviewing Hen. This angers Junior, who has become increasingly jealous and suspicious of both Hen and Terrance. Junior manages to eavesdrop on some of Hen’s and Terrance’s conversations and learns that Hen often feels stifled and trapped in her marriage, and that she feels he will not allow her to grow or pursue her own interests. Once Terrance asks her if she would like to get away, and she relates to him a fantasy she has of walking out on her husband and experiencing life beyond the farm - somewhere with other people and new ideas. After seeing Terrance spend so much time with Hen, Junior becomes convinced that it is Terrance who will be replacing him when he has gone.

After a confrontation with some OuterMore employees, Junior is knocked out. He wakes up hog tied on the floor of his guest bedroom, in front of an audience of OuterMore employees. Terrance congratulates him, saying that he did very well. Junior is confused, then astounded when another man looking exactly like him walks in through the door. Terrance introduces the stranger as the real Junior who has just returned from the Installation. He explains to the tied-up Junior that he is the duplicate, placed in the home and activated by Terrance’s car headlights during Terrance’s first visit to the house. The duplicate refuses to believe this and cries out to Hen for help, but she remains quiet in another room. Finally, Hen cannot bear the sound of duplicate Junior’s pleas and she fights through OuterMore security to comfort him. She then becomes belligerent, attacking the onlooking OuterMore employees for being cruel to the duplicate. Security drags her outside and holds her there. Her display of emotion stuns everyone in the room including her husband, the real Junior. As the duplicate becomes increasingly distressed, Terrance says, "it’s time for this to end," and shrink wraps him for storage. Terrance remarks that this unexpected scientific breakthrough of love between a human and a biomechanical duplicate will be written about for years.

The real Junior is pleased to be back home again with his wife, but is still a bit disturbed and offended by her display of affection towards his duplicate. She tells Junior that the duplicate helped her rediscover her love for her real husband by reminding her what their relationship used to be like. She says she regrets him having been shut down but wants to find that dynamic again with the real Junior. This angers Junior, who can't understand how she could have felt anything at all for her "fake digital husband." Their relationship deteriorates as Hen realizes that the real Junior no longer has the qualities she loved in the duplicate, and maybe never did.

Eventually, Hen walks out, leaving Junior a blank note. He attempts to track her down at her work, but cannot find her. Terrance comes to the house and sees that before Hen left, she destroyed the piano that the real Junior never allowed her to play. That night Hen returns, bathed in headlights from outside, but has changed – she is affectionate, submissive, and happy. When Hen reacts to a bug she had seen earlier in the film as if it was the first time, Junior realises she has been duplicated. He is slightly wary, but pleased to have his wife back to the way he likes her. The real Hen is seen on an airplane, leaving their home behind.

== Cast ==
- Saoirse Ronan as Hen
- Paul Mescal as Junior
- Aaron Pierre as Terrance
- Jane Harber as News Reporter
- Laura Gordon as OuterMore Customer

== Production ==
It was announced in June 2021 that Garth Davis would be directing the film in addition to co-writing with the author of the novel, Iain Reid. Saoirse Ronan, Paul Mescal, and Lakeith Stanfield were announced to star. In October, Aaron Pierre was cast to replace Stanfield.

Filming began in Winton, Victoria, Australia, in January 2022 and wrapped in South Australia in April 2022.

== Release ==
Amazon Studios entered negotiations for the distribution rights in July 2021. On August 15, 2023, along with first look images of the film, it was revealed that it would be released by Amazon Studios on October 6, 2023, in the United States, before the distributor rebranded to Amazon MGM Studios following their 2022 acquisition of Metro-Goldwyn-Mayer.

The film premiered at the 2023 New York Film Festival as part of the Spotlight Gala on September 30.

The film was scheduled to be released in Australia by Transmission Films on October 19, before it was delayed to November 2, 2023.

Foe was released on Prime Video on January 5, 2024.

== Reception ==
On the review aggregator website Rotten Tomatoes, 24% of 116 critics' reviews are positive, with an average rating of 4.7/10. The website's consensus reads: "Paul Mescal and Saoirse Ronan give it all they've got, but they're ultimately undone by Foe's clunky sci-fi trappings and ponderous attempts to generate psychological thrills." Metacritic, which uses a weighted average, assigned the film a score of 44 out of 100, based on 34 critics, indicating "mixed or average" reviews.

Luke Goodsell wrote for ABC Arts after its release in Australia: "Oscar nominees Ronan and Mescal are both charismatic, gripping performers, and they give Hen and Junior a rich sense of lived-in love and loathing. But despite the stars' best, hot-and-bothered exertion, Davis and Reid's screenplay eventually hangs them out to dry".
