= Aaron Pierre =

Aaron Pierre may refer to:

- Aaron Pierre (footballer) (born 1993), Grenadian footballer
- Aaron Pierre (actor) (born 1994), English actor
