= Someone Great =

Someone Great may refer to:

- "Someone Great" (song), by LCD Soundsystem
- Someone Great (film), a 2018 film
