= Antkind =

Novel by Charlie Kaufman

- First edition cover (US)
- Author: Charlie Kaufman
- Language: English
- Genre: Absurdist fiction, comedy, satire
- Publisher: Random House
- Publication date: July 7, 2020
- Publication place: United States
- Media type: Print
- Pages: 720
- ISBN: 0399589686

Antkind is the 2020 debut novel of American screenwriter and film director Charlie Kaufman.

Kaufman said in 2016 that the novel was being written so as to be unfilmable, and is itself about "an impossible movie."

== Synopsis ==
Neurotic failed film critic B. Rosenberger Rosenberg stumbles upon what may be the greatest artistic achievement in human history: a three-month-long film, complete with scheduled sleeping, eating, and bathroom breaks, that took its reclusive auteur, a psychotic African-American man named Ingo Cutbirth, 90 years to complete. B. makes it his mission to show it to the rest of humanity. But the film is destroyed when he stops for a soda, leaving just a single frame from which B. must somehow attempt to recall the film that might just be the last great hope of civilization. The novel grows to encompass a vast array of concepts and plotlines.

B. is obsessed with proving his politically correct bona fides, boasting of his relationship with a Black sitcom star and his constant use of an uncommon non-binary pronoun, "thon". His daughter is an estranged filmmaker whose work receives negative reviews from her father, who prefers both ultra-obscure experimental films and the works of Judd Apatow. His attempts to mentally reconstruct the three-month movie send him to a wide variety of psychiatrists and hypnotists, most notably the sinister Barassini, whose work begins to have perverse effects on his body. He finds himself beginning to shrink, and is constantly falling down manholes. He experiments with ketamine, and develops a clown fetish. At one point plastic surgery is conducted on him without his consent. He is forced to pursue careers selling shoes at Zappos and working in a deli to impress a woman. His knowledge of film is seemingly deteriorating, as he constantly and surreally misquotes and misremembers movies.

Several other plotlines concern the St. Augustine Monster; a war fought between android clones of Donald Trump; a fast food restaurant named Slammy's; a murder attempt by Abbott and Costello on a rival comedy team, Mudd and Molloy, which is depicted in Cutbirth's film; and several forms of time travel, including by a precognitive meteorologist, clones of other characters (including Trump and a more financially successful B.), and a virus invented by a sapient ant living in the distant future.

== Reception ==
Matthew Specktor writing for The New York Times praised the novel for its surrealism and humor, writing: "It must be said that, by any standard—and even for someone who remembers the shock of Kaufman’s work when it was passed around Hollywood as unproduced samizdat in the 1990s—Antkind is an exceptionally strange book. It is also an exceptionally good one." Anita Felicelli of the Los Angeles Review of Books praised Kaufman's storytelling, calling it "a thrilling first novel trying to assume the form of consciousness itself, with all its digressions and delusions ... Antkind is Kaufman pushing himself to every formal and social limit, no holds barred, bleak and devastating, yet marvelous." Chief film critic of The Guardian Peter Bradshaw wrote, "[Kaufman] may be someone for whom anxiety and sadness are a personal ordeal, but he transforms them into bleak, stark, unearthly monuments to comic despair."

In a review for Slate, Laura Miller wrote: "What at first appears to be a parody of the parasitical nature of criticism soon metastasizes into a grab bag of long-standing Kaufman motifs and themes...This proves a mixed blessing, as B himself is such a relentlessly broad caricature that he makes the cadaverous restaurant critic in Ratatouille seem nuanced."

=== Accolades ===
The book was longlisted for The Center for Fiction's First Novel Prize.
