= Vertical (novel) =

2010 book by Rex Pickett

- Author: Rex Pickett
- Language: English
- Genre: Fiction, comedy
- Publication date: September 10, 2010
- Publication place: United States
- Media type: Print, e-book
- Pages: 404 pp
- ISBN: 978-0-9831434-4-4
- Preceded by: Sideways
- Followed by: Sideways 3 Chile

Vertical is a 2010 novel (also known as Sideways Oregon) by Rex Pickett and the second novel in the Sideways Series. It is a sequel to the novel Sideways, which was made into a successful 2004 film of the same name.

The novel takes place seven years after the events depicted in Sideways. It contains the same characters as in the earlier novel: Miles, a writer, his friend Jack, a sometime actor, and Miles' mother Phyllis, all wine lovers. Miles is now a successful author, having written a novel called "Shameless" with much the same situations as the real-life Sideways. Like Sideways, "Shameless" has been adapted as a successful movie. Jack, who had been prosperous in Sideways, is now divorced and short of cash. Pickett says that the character Jack is based on his friend Roy Gittens, a film electrician.

The novel recounts a road trip involving the three and a Filipina caretaker, Joy, as they head first to Oregon's Willamette Valley for the International Pinot Noir Celebration, and then to Sheboygan, Wisconsin, where Phyllis is to live with her sister, Alice.

The book was self-published by Pickett. He has said that the book is autobiographical:

The trip didn't happen with Jack, but everything with my mother was real. I lived that, and Jack is that character now, he's a guy who's gone to seed. And I am a guy who's had success and overimbibed and did some things that I don't do anymore.

== Plot ==
As the novel begins, Miles agrees to take his ailing mother, Phyllis, to live with her sister in Wisconsin. He convinces Jack to tag along as wingman in return for some cash, hires a pot-smoking Filipina caretaker, Joy, to attend to his mother, and recovers Phyllis's beloved Yorkie, Snapper, from one of his ex-girlfriends. They then set out on a trek that takes them up the California coastline and to Oregon wine country for a wild pinot noir festival. Through it all, the four have many conflicts and misadventures, as well as sexual escapades. Snapper gets into an accident and ultimately loses a leg, and Phyllis and Joy are constantly quarreling.

The tensions come to a head in Oregon, where Joy abruptly quits after being falsely accused of stealing money from Phyllis. Jack goes back to California, and Miles is forced to drive with his mother to Wisconsin. He quits drinking. In Wisconsin, Phyllis's sister has difficulty coping with Phyllis. His mother has another stroke and is hospitalized, and at her request Miles causes her death with an overdose of Seconal. At the end, Miles plans to travel to Barcelona, Spain, to be with a woman he met during the trip.

== Critical reaction ==
The Hollywood Reporter called Vertical "a real change in direction from Sideways. The latter is a classic buddy story, the new novel a mother-and-son story." The reviewer said that "Pickett is no prose stylist, but his character depictions are ruthlessly vivid and clear. Everyone is the captain of his or her own fate; blame belongs where it belongs, which is not on bad fathers, absent mothers or demanding ex-wives." The assisted suicide at the end, he said, "makes perfect sense; it's one of supreme compassion and renewed hope."

The New York Review of Books called Vertical "an entertaining and touching book" and "laugh-out-loud funny." The reviewer noted that, contrary to the usual conventions of sequels, the Miles of Sideways is not the Miles of Vertical, because the novel "Shameless" (the proxy for Sideways) is described in Vertical as fictionalized. For instance, the "Martin" of "Shameless," like the Miles of Sideways, is described as being a wine expert, while the Miles of Vertical is described as not a wine expert and leaning heavily on a wine reference book.

== Film adaptation ==
Alexander Payne, who directed the film adaptation of Sideways, has indicated that he is not interested in directing a sequel to the film based on Vertical. Fox Searchlight owns the rights to the characters, but Payne's lack of interest makes the film a non-starter for Fox.

Anticipating a sequel to the film Sideways, Pickett deliberately omitted the character Terra from Vertical. In the film Sideways, Terra was played by Sandra Oh, who was married to Payne at the time. Pickett said that because Oh made many script changes which Pickett disliked, such as renaming her character to Stephanie, and she later had a bitter divorce with Payne, he eliminated her character from Vertical so that he would not have to work with Oh if a sequel were made.

== Stage and musical adaptions ==
In 2019 it was announced that Sideways was scheduled to be adapted for a Broadway musical. A play adapted by author Rex Pickett from the Sideways novel was produced at multiple theaters in the United States and the United Kingdom, including at the La Jolla Playhouse.

In addition to the musical, it was reported that Rex Pickett had written screenplays based on his two Sideways sequels already in print, Vertical and Sideways 3 Chile.
