= Sideways 3 Chile =

Book by Rex Pickett

- Author: Rex Pickett
- Language: English
- Genre: Fiction, comedy
- Publisher: First Edition Design Publishing
- Publication date: 2015
- Publication place: United States
- Media type: Print, e-book
- Preceded by: Vertical
- Followed by: Sideways New Zealand

Sideways 3 Chile is a 2015 novel by Rex Pickett. It is a sequel to his two previous novels Sideways (2004) and Vertical (2010) and the third novel in the Sideways Series.

Sideways 3 Chile continues the story of novelist Miles Raymond. Picking up approximately one year after the previous book, this installment finds Miles traveling to Chile to research an article for a wine magazine, and also to hopefully get inspiration for another novel. To provide realistic background for the novel, Pickett explored Chile's varied microclimates for months.

== Plot ==
This third installment picks up about one year after we last saw Miles at the conclusion of Vertical. By this time his professional life is once again beginning to slow down. While he is still able to make a modest amount of money off of the fame he achieved with the publication of his autobiographical novel Shameless (and the highly successful film adapted from it), demand for him as a public speaker at wine events has waned, Hollywood fortune has failed to materialize, and he has written no further books. His personal life has fared no better, as he has just ended his affair with the wife of a well-known movie director.

In the midst of these troubles Miles is hired by a magazine to travel to Chile to write an article about the country's wine industry. He accepts the job in the hope of being able to find inspiration for his own writing. During the course of the plot Miles reconnects with characters from the previous entries in the series including his best friend Jack, on-and-off girlfriend Maya, and a Spanish woman named Laura.

== Stage and musical adaptions ==
In 2019 it was announced that Sideways was scheduled to be adapted for a Broadway musical. A play adapted by author Rex Pickett from the Sideways novel was produced at multiple theaters in the United States and the United Kingdom, including at the La Jolla Playhouse.

In addition to the musical, it was reported that Rex Pickett had written screenplays based on his two Sideways sequels already in print, Vertical and Sideways 3 Chile.
