= Aaron Pierre (actor) =

British actor and model (born 1994)

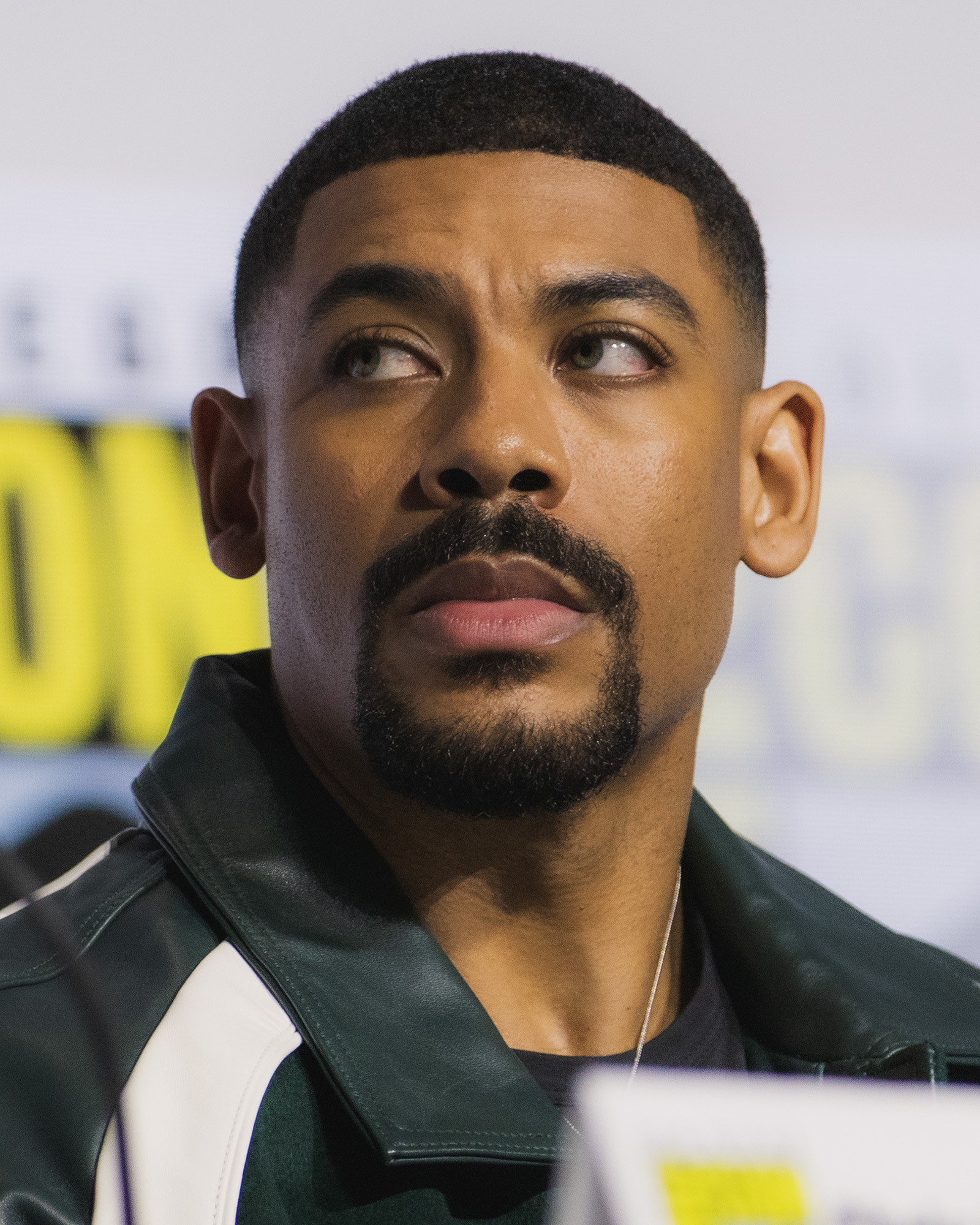
- Pierre in 2026
- Born: 7 June 1994 (age 32); London, England
- Occupations: Actor; model
- Years active: 2016–present
- Children: 1

Aaron Stone Pierre (born 7 June 1994) is a British actor and model. He is best known for his roles as John Stewart / Green Lantern in the DC Universe (DCU) series Lanterns, Dev-Em in Krypton (2018–2019), Caesar Garner in The Underground Railroad (2021), Rapper "Mid-Sized Sedan" in Old (2021), Terry Richmond in Rebel Ridge (2024), Malcolm X in Genius (2024), and the voice of Mufasa in Mufasa: The Lion King (2024).

Pierre is set to reprise the role of Stewart in the upcoming Man of Tomorrow (2027).

== Early life ==
Aaron Stone Pierre was born in London on 7 June 1994. His mother is from Jamaica, and he has Curaçaoan and Sierra Leonean heritage on his father’s side. He participated in athletics and sprinting as a child, having idolised American gold medalist sprinter Maurice Greene, and developed an interest in acting as a teenager. He attended The John Fisher School in Purley and later joined the Croydon Young People's Theatre (CRYPT). He studied Performing Arts at Lewisham College and trained in Toronto before joining the London Academy of Music and Dramatic Art, where he graduated in 2016.

== Career ==
=== Acting ===
Pierre appeared in two episodes of the BBC One series The A Word and played a Roman soldier Antonius in series 1 of the Sky Atlantic series Britannia. In 2018, he began starring as Dev-Em in the Syfy series Krypton. That same year, Pierre starred as Cassio in Othello at Shakespeare's Globe. For his performance, he received an Ian Charleson Award commendation. He played the King opposite Lenny Henry in the 2019 production of King Hedley II at the Theatre Royal Stratford East.

American director Barry Jenkins saw Pierre in Othello and sent him a message afterwards, inviting him to audition for his new series. Pierre landed the role of Caesar in The Underground Railroad, released on Amazon Prime in May 2021. In July 2021, Pierre appeared as Mid-Sized Sedan / Brendan in M. Night Shyamalan's film Old.

In August 2021, it was reported that Pierre would reteam with Barry Jenkins as a young Mufasa in a Lion King film. Pierre provided the voice of young Mufasa in Mufasa: The Lion King, released in December 2024.

In October 2021, after John Boyega stepped down for family reasons, Pierre starred in Jeremy Saulnier's film Rebel Ridge, streamed on Netflix in 2024.

In February 2022, Pierre joined the cast of the then-planned superhero film Blade, which was to be set in the Marvel Cinematic Universe and was scheduled to premiere on November 7, 2025. He was released from the project in March 2024, as a result of script rewrites.

Pierre won the Best Supporting Performance in a Film at the 11th Canadian Screen Awards in 2023, for his performance as Francis in the film Brother. In 2023, he starred in Foe, an adaptation of the novel of the same name by Iain Reid.

In October 2024, Pierre was cast as John Stewart / Green Lantern in DC Studios's Lanterns television series. According to GQ magazine, 2024 was "a busy breakout year that included portraying Malcolm X in the Genius: MLK/X series, flexing his best Rambo in Netflix’s hit fall action thriller Rebel Ridge, and signing on to play DC Universe space cop John Stewart in the upcoming Green Lantern streaming series Lanterns. These days, Pierre’s rising star is everywhere".

In June 2025, it was announced that Pierre would be starring alongside Margaret Qualley and Patrick Schwarzenegger in Love of Your Life for Amazon MGM Studios. In July 2025, it was announced that Pierre would be joining Jennifer Hudson and Ayesha Curry in Stephen Curry and Sony Pictures animated film Goat. In August 2025, It was announced that Pierre would be joining the cast in Star Wars: Starfighter alongside Amy Adams, and Ryan Gosling, in the Shawn Levy-directed Star Wars movie.

=== Music ===
Pierre is also a rapper, although he rarely makes music. In 2019, Pierre released a rap EP titled Ante Meridiem under the name Ilan Stone. In 2021, he recorded the song "More Dough for the Cookin", which was featured on the soundtrack for the motion picture Old. In 2026, his track "Staying" began gaining more traction online due to being used in Lanterns-based memes.

== Personal life ==
Pierre briefly dated American singer Teyana Taylor in 2025. He has a son from a previous relationship.

Pierre took up boxing in 2016 and Brazilian jiu-jitsu in 2019, winning his first jiu-jitsu tournament in 2023.

Pierre revealed his OCD diagnosis during a press event for HBO’s “Lanterns” series in 2026.

== Filmography ==
†	Film or show that is yet to be released

=== Film ===
Year	Title	Role	Notes	Ref.
2021	Old	Mid-Sized Sedan / Brendan		
2022	Brother	Francis		
2023	Foe	Terrance		
2024	Rebel Ridge	Terry Richmond		
2024	Mufasa: The Lion King	Mufasa (voice)		
2026	Goat	Mane Attraction (voice)		
2026	Love of Your Life	Felix		
2027	Star Wars: Starfighter †	TBA	Post-production	
2027	Man of Tomorrow †	John Stewart / Green Lantern	Post-production	
TBA	Fairytale in New York †	TBA	Pre-production	

=== Television ===
Year	Title	Role	Notes	Ref.
2017	Prime Suspect 1973	Terrence O'Duncie	2 episodes	
2017	The A Word	James Thorne	2 episodes (series 2)	
2018	Britannia	Antonius	3 episodes (series 1)	
2018–2019	Krypton	Dev-Em	Main role; 20 episodes	
2021	The Underground Railroad	Caesar Garner	Miniseries	
2024	Genius	Malcolm X	Lead role (season 4)	
2025	The Morning Show	Miles	Recurring role (season 4)	
2026– Present	Lanterns	John Stewart / Green Lantern	Lead role	

== Stage ==
Year	Title	Role	Notes	Ref.
2018	Othello	Cassio	Globe Theatre, London	
2019	King Hedley II	King	Theatre Royal Stratford East, London	
2026	One Flew Over the Cuckoo's Nest	Randle P. McMurphy	The Old Vic, London	

== Awards and nominations ==
Year	Award	Category	Work	Result	Ref.
2018	Ian Charleson Awards		Othello	Nominated	
2023	Canadian Screen Award	Best Supporting Performance in a Film	Brother	Won	
2025	NAACP Image Award	Outstanding Actor in a Television Movie, Mini-Series or Dramatic Special	Rebel Ridge	Won	
2025	BET Awards	Best Actor	Rebel Ridge	Nominated	
2025	Kids' Choice Awards	Favorite Song from a Movie	"I Always Wanted a Brother" from Mufasa: The Lion King	Nominated	
2025	Gotham TV Award	Outstanding Performance In An Original Film	Rebel Ridge	Won	
2026	MOBO Awards	Outstanding Performance in a Television/Film	Mufasa: The Lion King	Nominated	
