= Jessie Henderson =

Film and TV Executive

Jessie Henderson is a film and TV producer and executive. She was a former Apple Original Films executive.

== Early life and education ==
Henderson was born in Michigan and raised in Massachusetts. She graduated with a degree in Media studies from Emerson College.

== Career ==
After graduation, she moved to New York City and worked as the receptionist on the last season of Tough Crowd With Colin Quinn. While there, she fell in love with the world of stand-up comedy, and went on to work as Neal Brennan's assistant on the last season of Chappelle's Show.

She moved to Los Angeles in 2008 to be an assistant at Universal Pictures, and in 2009 became one of the early employees at Peter Chernin's Chernin Entertainment, where she was promoted from Creative Executive to Director of Development and set up and co-produced The Heat, which became the top grossing domestic comedy of 2013.

After Chernin Entertainment, she spent 6+ years running Paul Feig's Feigco Entertainment, where she produced films including the Golden Globe and Critics Choice nominated Spy, A Simple Favor, Someone Great, Last Christmas, and executive produced 2016's Ghostbusters, Holler, and Zoey’s Extraordinary Playlist. She started the company with Paul Feig and spearheaded an expansion from film to film + television in 2018. She led the company through two feature term deals with Fox and later Universal Pictures and Lionsgate Television.

She then became Head of Original Films for HBO Max, where she was hired in 2019 to build a slate of films under the AT&T ownership period of WarnerMedia. In 2021, she started at Apple Original Films.

After working at Apple Original Films, she, with Canadian actor Ryan Gosling launched a film production company named Open Invite Entertainment (formally known as General Admission). They obtained three-year deal with Amazon MGM Studios.
