= My Mother Dreams the Satan's Disciples in New York =

1998 film

- Film poster
- Directed by: Barbara Schock
- Written by: Rex Pickett
- Produced by: John Willis Martin; Tammy Tiehel
- Starring: Helen Stenborg; Patricia Dunnock
- Cinematography: Chris Manley
- Edited by: Andrew Seklir
- Music by: Michael McCuistion
- Production company: AFI Conservatory
- Distributed by: AtomFilms
- Release date: October 1998 (AFI Fest)
- Running time: 30 minutes
- Country: United States
- Language: English

My Mother Dreams the Satan's Disciples in New York is a 1998 short film directed by Barbara Schock. It was made as a thesis film for the AFI Conservatory. In 2000, it won an Oscar at the 72nd Academy Awards for Best Live Action Short Film.

== Cast ==
- Helen Stenborg - Marian
- Patricia Dunnock - Paula
- Scott Sowers - Prospect Biker
- Mickey Jones - Head Biker
- Suzanne Cryer - Marika
- Ilia Volokh - Taxi Driver
- Don Gettinger - Paula's Boss
- Steve Bonge - Lead Biker
- Linda Mancini - Woman on Fire Escape
- Paul Gold - Clubhouse Biker #1
- Camille Carida - Girlfriend on Stairs
- John Henry Whitaker - Clubhouse Biker
