= From Hollywood to Deadwood =

- Film release poster
- Directed by: Rex Pickett
- Written by: Rex Pickett
- Starring: Scott Paulin; Jim Haynie; Barbara Schock
- Production company: Nightfilm
- Distributed by: Island Pictures
- Release date: 1988
- Running time: 102 minutes
- Country: United States
- Language: English

From Hollywood to Deadwood is a 1988 American crime mystery film written and directed by Rex Pickett and starring Scott Paulin, Jim Haynie and Barbara Schock.

== Plot ==
A movie studio hires a pair of private detectives to track down an actor that's gone missing.

== Cast ==
- Scott Paulin as Raymond Savage
- Jim Haynie as Jack Haines
- Barbara Schock as Lana Dark

== Reception ==
TV Guide gave the film a mixed review: "Unfortunately, writer-director Rex Pickett (making his feature debut) lets the story drag in spots, and the perfunctory development of the relationship between Shock and Paulin's characters is one of several shaky stretches in the narrative. What does work in From Hollywood to Deadwood is the unique rapport between Paulin and Haynie's characters, detectives who turn out to be a would-be novelist and a crass but sympathetic ex-actor."

Chris Willman of the Los Angeles Times gave the film a negative review, describing it as "merely scrambled" and "wildly miscast".
