= Foe (Reid novel) =

2018 novel by Iain Reid

- First edition cover
- Author: Iain Reid
- Language: English
- Genres: Psychological thriller, horror, science fiction
- Publisher: Simon & Schuster
- Publication date: August 7, 2018
- Publication place: United States
- Pages: 224 (hardback)
- ISBN: 978-1-5011-0347-6
- OCLC: 1049548142
- Dewey Decimal: 813/.6—dc23
- LC Class: PR9199.4.R455 F64 2018

Foe is the second novel by Canadian writer Iain Reid. It was released in August 2018 in the United States by Simon & Schuster. The book has been described as a psychological thriller and horror fiction against a science fiction backdrop. Reid referred to it as a "philosophical suspense story". Foe is set in the near future and is about a married couple living on a remote farm whose lives are thrown in turmoil when a stranger arrives.

Foe was placed on the Horror Writers Association's 2018 Bram Stoker Awards Preliminary Ballot for "Superior Achievement in a Novel". The book was translated into German by Anke Kreutzer and Eberhard Kreutzer as Enemy and published by Droemer in 2019.

== Plot summary ==
Foe is set in the near future, and is narrated by Junior, who lives with his wife Henrietta (Hen) on a remote farm. In the novel, all dialogue is punctuated with quotation marks, except for Junior's, which has none. One night a stranger appears at their door who introduces himself as Terrance from an aerospace corporation called OuterMore. Terrance announces that Junior has been selected to travel to the Installation, a large space station in orbit around Earth. He will remain there for about two years, before returning home. Junior is deeply in love with Hen and is not happy leaving her alone. Terrance reassures him that while he is gone, he will be replaced by a biomechanical duplicate that will care for her. Junior is horrified. Terrance visits the farm house regularly to interview him and collect data to help configure his replacement.

Relations between Junior and Hen become strained. He resents Terrance's presence and she will not talk about it. After about two years, Terrance moves in with them so he can monitor Junior's daily routine. Terrance also spends time interviewing Hen, which angers Junior. He manages to eavesdrop on some of their conversations, and it seems that she knows more about what is going on than she is telling him. Once Terrance asks her if she would like to get away, and she relates to him a fantasy she has of walking out on her husband. After seeing Terrance spend so much time with Hen, Junior becomes convinced that it is Terrance who will be replacing him when he has gone.

One day Terrance congratulates Junior, saying that he did very well. Junior is confused, then astounded when another man looking exactly like him walks in through the door. Terrance introduces the stranger as the real Junior who has just returned from the Installation. He explains to a stunned Junior that he is the replacement sent two years ago to live with the real Junior's wife. The duplicate refuses to believe this and pleads with Hen for help, but she remains quiet. As he becomes filled with rage, Terrance says, "It's time for this to end," and shuts him down.

The real Junior becomes the narrator, with quote-marked speech, and is pleased to be back home again with his wife. When he asks Hen what it was like living with "it", she says it was difficult at first. His behaviour was predictable, but he adapted quickly and she was surprised how much he genuinely cared for her. She says she regrets him having been shut down. This angers Junior, who can't understand how she could have felt anything for her "fake digital husband". Their relationship deteriorates, until one day she walks out. That night she returns, but has changed – she is affectionate and caring. Junior is pleased to have his wife back as he remembered her. In the text, Hen's dialogue now has no quotation marks. A few days later, Terrance visits briefly to check on them. Hen is pleased to see him and says that everything is fine. Junior agrees, adding, "things are finally getting back to normal".

== Background ==
Reid said in an interview that the theme of isolation in Foe and his first novel, I'm Thinking of Ending Things comes from growing up on a farm in remote Ontario. While he appreciates solitude, he said he recognises the importance of relationships, and the tension between seclusion and companionship fascinates him.

Reid said his desire to write about space came from his brother, who works in the space industry. He discussed this topic often with his brother, but when Reid gave him early drafts of Foe to read, his response was, "It's not really about space." Reid ended up cutting so much that the outer-space parts became "more of a metaphor than anything else".

== Reception ==
In a review in the Los Angeles Review of Books, Gabino Iglesias described Foe as "an engrossing, strange, addictive read." He said the blend of "literary fiction, science fiction, psychological thriller, and horror" produces an unsettling read in which every event is viewed with suspicion. While most of the story takes place in Junior and Henrietta's farmhouse, Reid's exploration of their relationship makes it "a universe full of questions and possibilities." Iglesias called Reid "one of the most talented purveyors of weird, dark narratives in contemporary fiction."

Writing in The Columbus Dispatch, Margaret Quamme called the novel "stark" and "unsettling". She said its power is in what the story leaves out, rather than what it presents. Telling it from Junior's restricted point of view gives the reader a limited picture of what is happening. She remarked that Foe is science fiction in the same way that The Twilight Zone is science fiction – it explores human behaviour rather than creates "a credible, scientifically based world of the future." Quamme described Foe as "[a] subtly disturbing horror novel [that] lets the questions it raises hover, unresolved, in the reader's mind."

== Film adaptation ==
Reid sold the film rights for Foe to entertainment company Anonymous Content four months before the book was published. In June 2021, it was announced that Paul Mescal (playing Junior), Saoirse Ronan (Henrietta), and Aaron Pierre (Terrance) will star in the film. It was to be directed by Garth Davis, who also wrote the script with Reid, and produced by Davis, Kerry Kohansky Roberts, Emile Sherman and Iain Canning. Reid and Samantha Lang would be the executive producers. Filming was set to begin in Australia in January 2022.

As of July 2021, negotiations were underway by Amazon Studios to acquire the film, and by FilmNation Entertainment to secure the international rights.

The film was released exclusively in theaters on October 6, 2023.
