= Someone Great (film) =

2019 film by Jennifer Kaytin Robinson

- Official release poster
- Directed by: Jennifer Kaytin Robinson
- Written by: Jennifer Kaytin Robinson
- Produced by: Paul Feig; Jessie Henderson; Anthony Bregman; Peter Cron; Gina Rodriguez
- Starring: Gina Rodriguez; Brittany Snow; DeWanda Wise; Lakeith Stanfield; Peter Vack
- Cinematography: Autumn Eakin
- Edited by: Mollie Goldstein; Jeffrey Wolf
- Music by: Germaine Franco
- Production companies: Feigco Entertainment; Likely Story; I Can & I Will Productions
- Distributed by: Netflix
- Release date: April 19, 2019 (United States)
- Running time: 92 minutes
- Country: United States
- Language: English

Someone Great is a 2019 American romantic comedy film written and directed by Jennifer Kaytin Robinson (in her directorial debut). The film stars Gina Rodriguez, Brittany Snow, DeWanda Wise, Lakeith Stanfield, and Peter Vack.

Rodriguez plays a music journalist who decides to go on a last hurrah with her two best friends after her boyfriend dumps her right before she is due to leave New York to take her dream job on the west coast.

It was released by Netflix on April 19, 2019.

== Plot ==
Jenny, a music journalist living in New York City, lands her dream job with Rolling Stone in San Francisco. Her boyfriend of nine years, Nate, breaks up with her, and she spirals into a depression.

Jenny's best friends, Erin, a real estate agent afraid to admit her feelings to her girlfriend Leah, and Blair, a social media manager who has lost chemistry and needs to break up with her boyfriend Will, are the only ones who can bring her out of her funk. Jenny contacts Erin and Blair after learning the concert series known as Neon Classic is putting on a pop-up show at Sony Hall and proposes one last adventure together before she moves, both to celebrate a new chapter in her life and to mend her broken heart.

The girls meet up by taking a day off from work. Throughout the day, they find it difficult to secure tickets for the concert, eventually obtaining them through Jenny's former college crush, Matt, with whom Blair has sex. Erin and Jenny run into Leah, and Erin deals with unresolved issues stemming from her fear of commitment.

Blair breaks up with Will after finding him cleaning her apartment without her, and it ends amicably. The girls all go to the concert in the evening and Jenny runs into Nate, but cannot bring herself to talk to him, and gets separated from her friends. Matt takes her to the after-party where she realizes she needs closure.

After a heart-to-heart where Erin admits she needs to grow up and Blair admits that she needs to lower her own expectations, they go to find Jenny at the after-party, but not before Erin meets up with Leah and they acknowledge their feelings for each other and agree to take their relationship slow.

They discover that Jenny is no longer at the after-party and are initially confused when they are told that she left to "finish it", referring to the relationship. Erin realizes that Jenny went to Washington Square Park, where her relationship with Nate began. Jenny is found sitting on the side of the fountain where nine years prior he had written their initials and a smiley face inscribed within a heart.

Initially it seems that Nate came to apologize and ask to take her back, but this is proven to be a dream that Jenny had after she passed out. Blair and Erin come to find her and the three walk off together, promising that their friendship will stay strong even after Jenny leaves for San Francisco.

== Cast ==
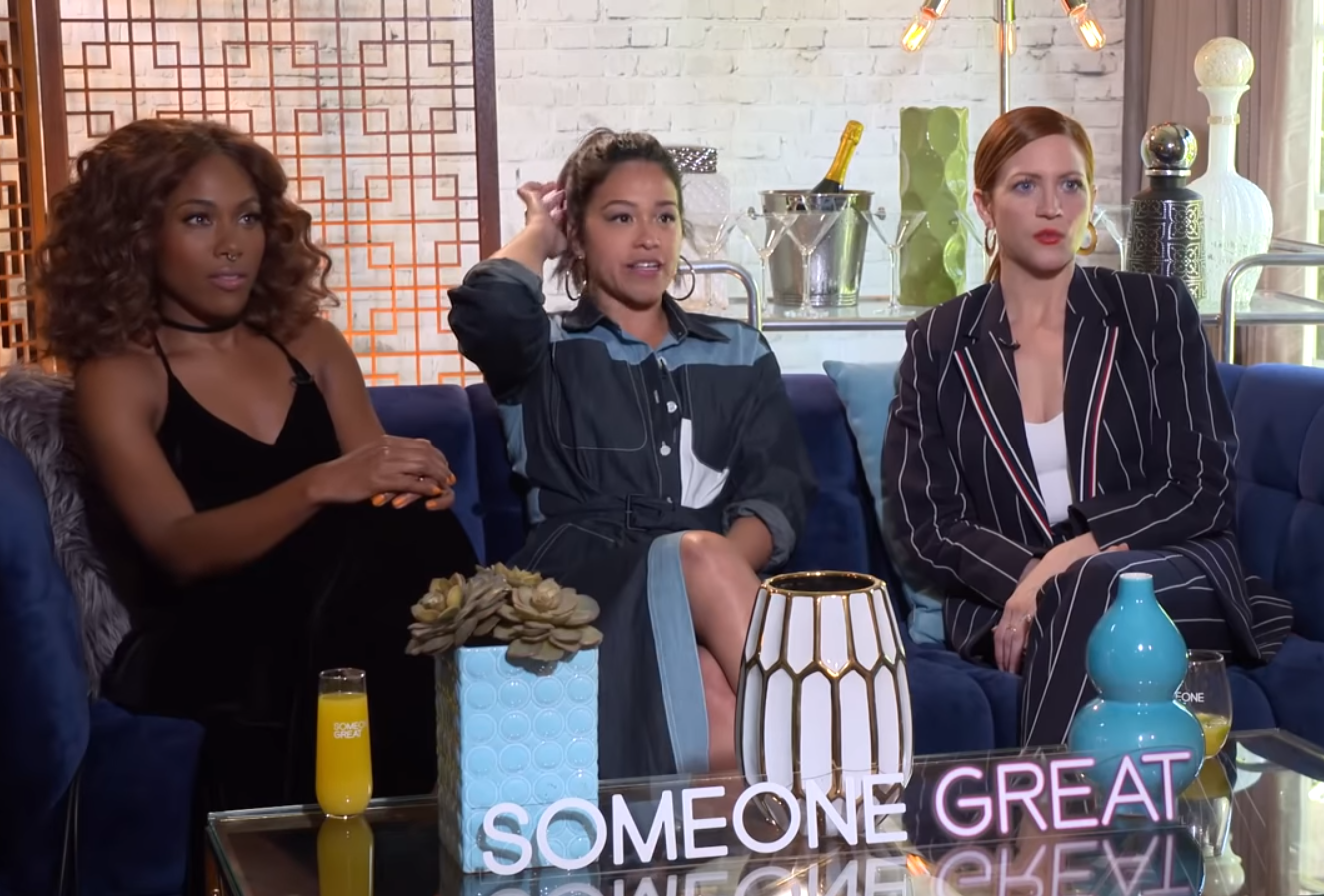
DeWanda Wise, Gina Rodriguez and Brittany Snow playing the Real Or Fake cocktail game on MTV.

- Gina Rodriguez as Jenny Young
- Brittany Snow as Blair Helms
- DeWanda Wise as Erin Kennedy
- LaKeith Stanfield as Nate Davis
- Peter Vack as Matt Lasher
- Rebecca Naomi Jones as Leah
- Alex Moffat as Will
- RuPaul Charles as Hype
- Rosario Dawson as Hannah Davis
- Michelle Buteau as Cynthia
- Jaboukie Young-White as Mikey
- Ben Sidell as Gus
- Joe Locicero as Paul
- Questlove as himself
- Jessie Reyez as herself

== Production ==
In February 2018, Gina Rodriguez signed on to star in and produce a film to serve as the directorial debut of Jennifer Kaytin Robinson from a screenplay she wrote. The story was described as being about loss, growing up and, above all, the everlasting bond of female friendships. In March 2018, Brittany Snow and DeWanda Wise were cast to portray the close friends of Rodriguez's character, while Lakeith Stanfield joined the cast to portray the ex-boyfriend of Rodriguez's character. In April 2018, Rosario Dawson joined the cast of the film. Principal photography on the film began on April 2, 2018, and wrapped on May 15.

=== Inspiration ===
1989, the fifth studio album by American singer-songwriter Taylor Swift, especially the track "Clean", was cited as the inspiration for Someone Great. The film, in turn, inspired Swift to write "Death by a Thousand Cuts", the tenth track on her seventh studio album Lover (2019). Robinson has also cited New Zealand singer Lorde's 2017 song "Supercut" as an inspiration for the film; "[Supercut] existed in the movie before any of the people in the movie existed"—she stated in an interview with Rolling Stone.

== Release ==
The film was released on April 19, 2019 on Netflix.

== Reception ==
On the review aggregator website Rotten Tomatoes, 84% of 51 critics' reviews are positive, with an average rating of 7/10. The website's consensus reads: "What Someone Great lacks in originality it makes up for in relatability and charm, thanks in large part to the undeniable chemistry between its talented leads." Metacritic, which uses a weighted average, assigned the film a score of 63 out of 100, based on 16 critics, indicating "generally favorable" reviews.

== Soundtrack ==
After the release of the film, the song "Truth Hurts" by Lizzo debuted at number 50 on the Billboard Hot 100 later peaking at number 1.
