= Charlie Kaufman =

American filmmaker and novelist

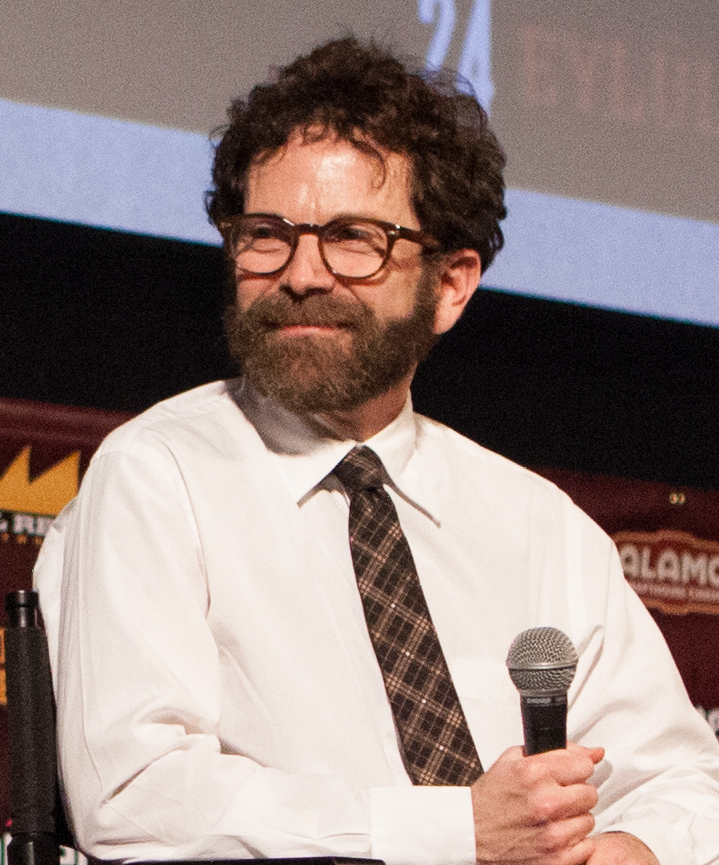
- Kaufman at the 2015 Fantastic Fest
- Born: Charles Stuart Kaufman; November 19, 1958 (age 67); New York City, U.S.
- Education: New York University (BFA)
- Occupations: Screenwriter; producer; director; novelist
- Years active: 1983–present
- Spouse: Denise Monaghan
- Children: 1

Charles Stuart Kaufman (/ˈkɔːfmən/; born November 19, 1958) is an American filmmaker and novelist. His work is distinguished by postmodernist and surrealist storytelling, with many critics considering him an auteur. Getting his start as a television writer, Kaufman gained prominence for his collaborations with directors Spike Jonze and Michel Gondry on Being John Malkovich (1999), Adaptation (2002), and Eternal Sunshine of the Spotless Mind (2004), before going on to direct films himself with Synecdoche, New York (2008), Anomalisa (2015), and I'm Thinking of Ending Things (2020). In 2020, he released a novel, Antkind.

One of the most celebrated screenwriters of his era, Kaufman has received numerous accolades, including an Academy Award, three BAFTA Awards, two Independent Spirit Awards, an Emmy Award, and a Writers Guild of America Award. Film critic Roger Ebert called Synecdoche, New York "the best movie of the decade" in 2009. Three of Kaufman's scripts appear in the Writers Guild of America's list of the 101 greatest movie screenplays ever written.

== Early life and education ==
Kaufman was born on November 19, 1958, in New York City to a Jewish family, the son of Helen and Myron Kaufman. He grew up in Massapequa, New York, before moving to West Hartford, Connecticut. In high school, Kaufman was in the drama club, performing in numerous productions before landing the lead role in a production of Play It Again, Sam during his senior year. After high school graduation, Kaufman attended Boston University before transferring to New York University, where he studied film. While attending NYU, Kaufman met Paul Proch, with whom he wrote many unproduced scripts and plays.

== Career ==
=== Early comedy work (1983–1997) ===
Between 1983 and 1984, Kaufman and Proch wrote comedic articles and spoofs for National Lampoon. His work included parodies of Kurt Vonnegut and the X-Men. Kaufman and Proch tried to get their screenplays produced, sending them to many people in the film industry. The only response the two ever received was a supportive letter from Alan Arkin about their screenplay Purely Coincidental. In hope of finding a talent agent, he wrote a portfolio of spec scripts based on television series such as Married... with Children, Newhart, It's Garry Shandling's Show and The Simpsons. While pursuing his writing career, he began working odd jobs in customer service to support himself and his wife, Denise. During the late 1980s, Kaufman lived and worked in Minneapolis, working at the Star Tribune circulation department for four and a half years, as well as the Minneapolis Institute of Art.

In 1991, one of Kaufman's spec scripts finally got attention, and he gained a talent agent. The agent suggested Kaufman move from Minneapolis to Los Angeles in search of more job prospects. He moved to Los Angeles alone for two months, interviewing for a variety of different television writing jobs. The only offer he got was a Comedy Central series titled Access America, hosted by actor Fred Willard, which coincidentally was being filmed in Minneapolis. Kaufman was prepared to accept the job and move back to Minneapolis until he was offered a job by David Mirkin, writing for the second season of his and Chris Elliott's sitcom Get a Life, starring Elliott. He wrote two episodes of Get a Life before its cancellation in 1992. At first, Kaufman found the experience of working on a writing staff nerve-wracking and did not speak in the writer's room for the first few weeks. After his work was well received by other members of the staff, Kaufman overcame his timidity and became more amenable to showing others his work.

After Get a Life's cancellation, Kaufman tried to get work on series such as Seinfeld, The Larry Sanders Show, The Simpsons and Mr. Show, but was not hired by any of them. He continued to work on other comedic series: Fox's sketch comedy show The Edge, The Trouble with Larry and Ned and Stacey, the last of which he also produced. The most notable series he worked on in this period was The Dana Carvey Show, which featured writers and performers such as Louis C.K., Robert Smigel, Greg Daniels, Stephen Colbert and Steve Carell. On all these series, Kaufman struggled to keep his material from being adulterated or not produced at all, because of his unconventional writing and his quiet nature.

Kaufman also wrote some pilot scripts of his own, but none of them were produced. These included two pilots for Disney, Depressed Roomies and Rambling Pants (the former a surrealist take on the "buddy sitcom" and the latter focused on the adventures of a time-travelling poet named Pants) and a pilot for HBO, In Limbo, a naturalistic look at a romantic relationship devoid of the usual tropes of romantic films. Before Being John Malkovich was released, he was hired to pitch and write scripts for film projects that were never produced. These unproduced projects included a script for an adaptation of Philip K. Dick's novel A Scanner Darkly, a pitch for a star vehicle for Don Rickles and Rodney Dangerfield in which they would play a washed-up, murderous comedy duo (an idea Kaufman used in Antkind), and a pitch for a R-rated version of the TV series Gilligan's Island.

=== Transition to films (1999–2004) ===
Kaufman first came to mainstream notice as the writer of Being John Malkovich, directed by Spike Jonze, earning an Academy Award nomination for his effort and winning a BAFTA. He wrote the script on spec in 1994, sending it to many companies and studios, all of which turned it down. The script eventually reached Francis Ford Coppola, who passed it on to his then-son-in-law Jonze, who agreed to direct the film.

After the success of Being John Malkovich, another of Kaufman's screenplays was produced: Human Nature, which was directed by Michel Gondry and produced by Kaufman and Jonze. Kaufman and Jonze reunited yet again as the screenwriter and director of Adaptation, which earned him another Academy Award nomination and his second BAFTA. Adaptation featured a fictionalized version of Kaufman and his fictional twin brother, Donald, who is credited as writer of the film along with Kaufman. The idea came to Kaufman while attempting to adapt Susan Orlean's book The Orchid Thief into film. Struggling with writer's block, Kaufman turned the script into an exaggerated account of his struggles with adapting the screenplay.

Kaufman wrote the screenplay for Confessions of a Dangerous Mind, a biopic based on the "unauthorized autobiography" of Chuck Barris, the creator of such popular game shows as The Dating Game and host of The Gong Show. The film focuses on Barris's claim to have been a CIA hit man. It was George Clooney's directorial debut. Kaufman criticized Clooney for making drastic alterations to the script without consulting him (instead, Clooney consulted Barris). Kaufman said in an interview with William Arnold: "The usual thing for a writer is to deliver a script and then disappear. That's not for me. I want to be involved from beginning to end. And these directors [Gondry and Jonze] know that, and respect it."

Eternal Sunshine of the Spotless Mind, released in 2004, was Kaufman's second pairing with director Michel Gondry. Kaufman won his first Academy Award for Best Original Screenplay and third BAFTA for the film together with Gondry and French artist Pierre Bismuth. The trio also received the prestigious PEN American Center 2005 prize for screenplay for the film. David Edelstein described the film in Slate as "The Awful Truth turned inside-out by Philip K. Dick, with nods to Samuel Beckett, Chris Marker, John Guare—the greatest dramatists of our modern fractured consciousness. But the weave is pure Kaufman."

=== Directorial debuts and career struggles (2005–2014) ===
After agreeing to participate in Carter Burwell's Theater of the New Ear, a double bill "sound play", Kaufman wrote and directed the audio play Hope Leaves the Theater, while the other play in the production, Sawbones, was written and directed by the Coen Brothers. Hope Leaves the Theater follows a middle-aged woman, dissatisfied with her life and relationships, watching a play-within-the-play, and featured performances by Hope Davis, Peter Dinklage and Meryl Streep. Theater of the New Ear debuted in April 2005 at St. Ann's Warehouse in Brooklyn, New York. Due to scheduling conflicts, later productions of Theater of the New Ear did not feature the Coens' play, replacing it with Anomalisa, which Kaufman wrote under the pseudonym "'Francis Fregoli". Anomalisa centers on a man (David Thewlis) who perceives everyone in the world to be the same person (Tom Noonan) until he meets an exception (Jennifer Jason Leigh).

Kaufman made his directorial film debut with the postmodern film Synecdoche, New York, starring an ensemble cast led by Philip Seymour Hoffman. It premiered at the Cannes Film Festival in 2008. The idea for the film came when Kaufman and Spike Jonze were approached to direct a horror film. Rather than make a conventional horror film, the two agreed to have the film deal with things they found frightening, such as mortality and life's brevity. Kaufman decided to direct the film after Jonze left the project to direct Where the Wild Things Are instead. The film premiered at the 2008 Cannes Film Festival where it split critics, with some calling it the best film of the year and others finding it pretentious. In the years since its release, it has appeared on multiple lists ranking the best films of the 21st century. The film's poor box office resulted in Kaufman finding it difficult to gain funding for scripts to which he has attached himself as director.

Kaufman was slated to write and direct a film with the working title Frank or Francis. Few details have been confirmed about the plot, except that it is a musical comedy about internet anger culture and was set to star Jack Black, Nicolas Cage, Steve Carell, Kevin Kline, Catherine Keener, Paul Reubens, Jacki Weaver and Elizabeth Banks. In July 2012, Black said that funding for the project had fallen through, as the studio was unsure about its chances for success after the financial failure of Synecdoche, New York. Although the future of the project is not certain, Kaufman says "It could still happen. It would have to be reinvented, though. We had a whole cast and we were headed into pre-production. So, I'd have to get people back and who knows if they would be interested anymore. But at this point, we don't have any money, so that's a secondary concern."

Trying to make a return to television when the funding for Frank or Francis fell through, Kaufman sold a series to HBO in May 2012 with Catherine Keener attached to star, but the series did not get past the scripting stage. Kaufman also directed and wrote a pilot for FX titled How and Why in 2014. The plot was described as being about a "man (played by John Hawkes) who can explain how and why a nuclear reactor works but is clueless about life". Along with Hawkes, the pilot co-starred Michael Cera, Sally Hawkins, Catherine Keener and Tom Noonan. FX decided to not pick up the pilot.

While struggling to get his directorial work made, Kaufman continued to work as a writer for hire, writing numerous unproduced screenplays. These included a satire set on a planet inhabited by everyone who ever lived, to be directed by Spike Jonze; an adaptation of George Saunders's book CivilWarLand in Bad Decline, to be directed by Ben Stiller; and an adaptation of Arthur Herzog's novel IQ 83, starring Steve Carell. He later attempted to develop his IQ 83 screenplay into a limited series for HBO, to no avail. He also did uncredited rewrites on films such as Kung Fu Panda 2 and Ad Astra. In April 2012, Kaufman was hired to adapt Patrick Ness's Chaos Walking book series, of which he wrote the first draft before leaving the project. After multiple rewrites by other writers, the film was released in 2021 with Kaufman uncredited.

=== Continued film work and debut novel (2015–present) ===
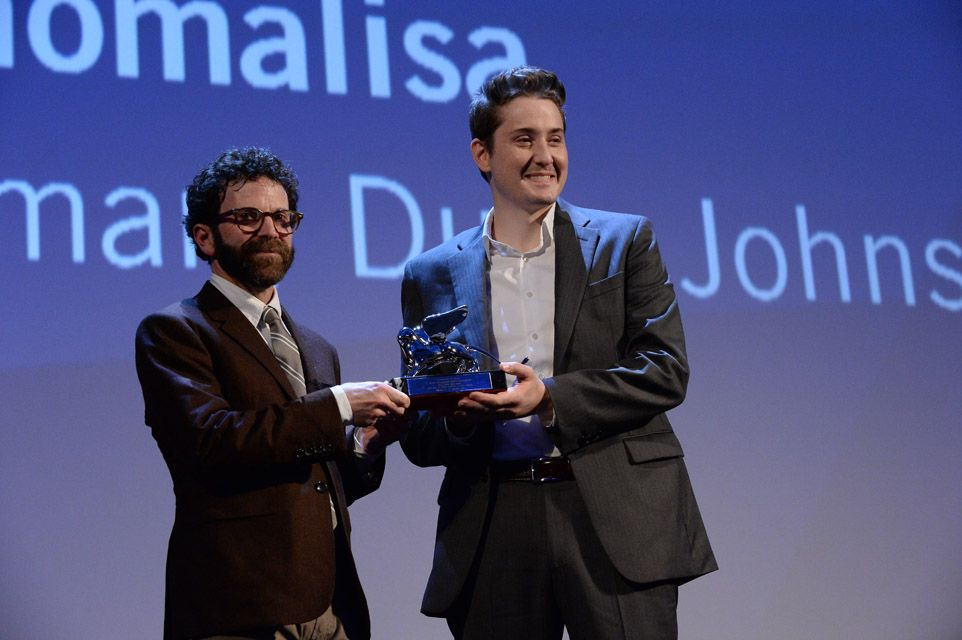
Kaufman (left) and Duke Johnson accepting the Grand Jury Prize for Anomalisa at the Venice Film Festival in 2015.

Dino Stamatopoulos, a former colleague of Kaufman's from The Dana Carvey Show, became interested in adapting Kaufman's Anomalisa play script into a stop motion animated film. With Kaufman's permission, Stamatopoulos turned to the crowd-funding website Kickstarter to fund the film. The Kickstarter page was set up in August 2012 and by the time funding had ended $406,237 was pledged. The rest of the $8 million budget was funded by the film's production company, Starburns Industries. Kaufman co-directed the film with Duke Johnson, who had previous experience in stop motion filmmaking, and the original cast of the play production returned to reprise their roles. It had its world premiere at the Telluride Film Festival on September 4, 2015, receiving universal acclaim from critics. The film went on to win the Grand Jury Prize at the Venice Film Festival and was nominated for an Academy Award for Best Animated Feature, but like Synecdoche, it did poorly at the box office.

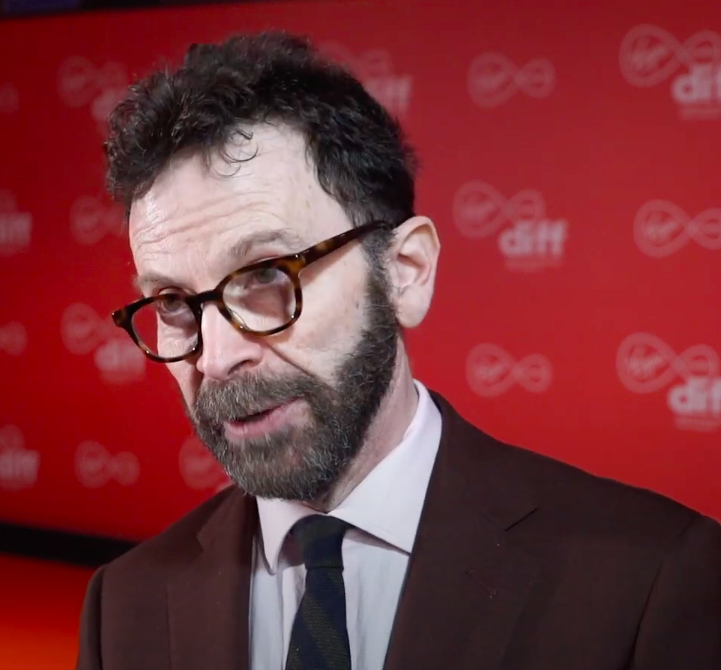
Kaufman at the 2020 Dublin International Film Festival

Kaufman's debut novel, Antkind, was released in July 2020. Kaufman said in 2016 that the novel was being written so as to be unfilmable, and is itself about "an impossible movie". In Antkind, film critic B. Rosenberg attempts to recall a three-month long stop-motion animation film that perished in a fire. Believing the film to be his last chance at achieving the respect and admiration of his peers, B. embarks on an absurdist journey that explores comedy, film theory, philosophy, and social commentary across Antkind's 706 pages.

In January 2018, it was announced that Kaufman was working on writing and directing an adaptation of Iain Reid's 2016 novel I'm Thinking of Ending Things. In December 2018, it was announced that Brie Larson and Jesse Plemons were signed to co-star as the leads; the film was described as "the story of a woman's trip to a family farm that leads to an unexpected detour leaving her stranded, [and] a twisted mix of palpable tension, psychological frailty and sheer terror ensues." The project began filming in March 2019, with Jessie Buckley having replaced Larson, and Toni Collette and David Thewlis joining the cast, and was released on Netflix in September 2020 to positive reviews.

In 2023, Kaufman directed his first short film, Jackals & Fireflies. Based on a poem by Eva H.D., who also plays the lead character, the film was shot entirely on a Samsung Galaxy S22 smartphone by cinematographer Chayse Irvin. Kaufman has written a script about dreams for Ryan Gosling's production company and an adaptation of the novel The Memory Police that Reed Morano is slated to direct. In 2025, the script centered on dreams was revealed to be titled Later the War, based on Iddo Gefen's short story "Debby's Dream House". Channing Tatum (replacing Eddie Redmayne), Tessa Thompson, and Patsy Ferran are slated to star, with Kaufman directing; filming is set for 2027 in Cyprus. Later that year, Kaufman directed his second short film, How to Shoot a Ghost—written and narrated by Eva H.D.—about two newly dead people who roam the streets of Athens, revisiting its dark history.

== Themes and influences ==
Kaufman's works explore such universal themes as identity crisis, mortality, and the meaning of life through a metaphysical or parapsychological framework. While his work resists labels, it is sometimes described as surrealist. He uses metafiction as a literary device, and sometimes includes fictionalized "facts" about his life in his work, notably Adaptation., Hope Leaves the Theater, and Antkind. Gender identity is also a recurrent theme in his work. Non-human primates also recur in Kaufman's early work: in Being John Malkovich, Lotte has a pet chimpanzee named Elijah; in Human Nature, Puff was raised as a chimpanzee; in Confessions of a Dangerous Mind, Penny dreams about a monkey; and in Adaptation, the original deus ex machina was a Bigfoot-like "Swamp Ape".

Writers and directors Kaufman has named as his favorites, or as influences, include Franz Kafka, Samuel Beckett, Eugene Ionesco, Stanisław Lem, Flannery O'Connor, Shirley Jackson, Philip K. Dick, Patricia Highsmith, Stephen Dixon, David Lynch, Lars von Trier, Roy Andersson, Woody Allen, and the Coen brothers. He has also mentioned Tom Noonan's What Happened Was... as a favorite of his.

== Personal life ==
As of 2020, Kaufman lives in Manhattan, having lived in Pasadena, California, since 1998. He is married to Denise Monaghan, with whom he has a daughter, Anna.

== Works ==
=== Film ===
| Year | Title | Director | Writer | Producer | Notes |
|---|---|---|---|---|---|
| 1999 | Being John Malkovich | No | Yes | Executive | |
| 2001 | Human Nature | No | Yes | Yes | |
| 2002 | Adaptation | No | Yes | Executive | |
| 2002 | Confessions of a Dangerous Mind | No | Yes | No | |
| 2004 | Eternal Sunshine of the Spotless Mind | No | Yes | Executive | |
| 2008 | Synecdoche, New York | Yes | Yes | Yes | |
| 2015 | Anomalisa | Yes | Yes | Yes | Co-directed with Duke Johnson |
| 2020 | I'm Thinking of Ending Things | Yes | Yes | Yes | |
| 2024 | Orion and the Dark | No | Yes | No | |

Executive producer only

- Darkest Miriam (2024)
- The Actor (2025)
- Uchronia (2026)

Short film

| Year | Title | Director | Producer |
|---|---|---|---|
| 2023 | Jackals & Fireflies | Yes | Yes |
| 2025 | How to Shoot a Ghost | Yes | Yes |

=== Television ===
| Year | Title | Director | Writer | Producer | Notes |
|---|---|---|---|---|---|
| 1991–1992 | Get a Life | No | Yes | No | 2 episodes |
| 1992–1993 | The Edge | No | Yes | No | 20 episodes |
| 1993 | The Trouble with Larry | No | Yes | No | Also story editor 1 episode |
| 1995 | Misery Loves Company | No | No | Yes | 6 episodes |
| 1996 | The Dana Carvey Show | No | Yes | No | 8 episodes |
| 1996–1997 | Ned and Stacey | No | Yes | Yes | 3 episodes |
| 2014 | How and Why | Yes | Yes | Executive | Also creator Unaired pilot |

=== Plays ===
| Year | Title | Director | Writer | Notes |
|---|---|---|---|---|
| 2005 | Hope Leaves the Theater | Yes | Yes | |
| 2005 | Anomalisa | Yes | Yes | Under the pseudonym Francis Fregoli |

Producer

- Pre-Existing Condition (2024)

=== Bibliography ===
| Year | Title | Publisher | ISBN | Length |
|---|---|---|---|---|
| 2020 | Antkind | Random House | 978–0399589683 | Novel |
| 2024 | "This Fact Can Even Be Proved by Means of the Sense of Hearing" | Little, Brown Book Group | 978–1646222636 | Short story |
