= List of Apple TV original films =

Apple TV, formerly known as Apple TV+, is a global on-demand Internet streaming media provider, owned and operated by Apple Inc., that features a number of original programs that includes original series, specials, miniseries, documentaries, with the majority of films distributed under Apple Original Films. Some films were released in theaters on or before their release on Apple TV.

== Original films ==
=== Feature films ===
Title	Genre	Apple TV release	Theatrical release	Runtime
Hala	Coming-of-age drama	December 6, 2019	November 22, 2019	1 h 33 min
The Banker	Historical drama	March 20, 2020	March 6, 2020	2 h
Greyhound (Note: Co-distributed with Sony Pictures Releasing)	War	July 10, 2020	—N/a	1 h 31 min
On the Rocks (Note: Co-distributed with A24)	Comedy drama	October 23, 2020	October 23, 2020	1 h 36 min
Wolfwalkers	Animated fantasy	December 11, 2020	November 13, 2020	1 h 42 min
Palmer	Drama	January 29, 2021	—N/a	1 h 50 min
Cherry	Crime drama	March 12, 2021	February 26, 2021	2 h 20 min
CODA	Coming-of-age drama	August 13, 2021	—N/a	1 h 52 min
Come from Away	Musical	September 10, 2021	—N/a	1 h 46 min
Finch	Science fiction	November 5, 2021	—N/a	1 h 55 min
Swan Song	Science fiction romance	December 17, 2021	—N/a	1 h 51 min
The Tragedy of Macbeth	Historical thriller	January 14, 2022	December 25, 2021	1 h 45 min
The Sky Is Everywhere	Coming-of-age drama	February 11, 2022	—N/a	1 h 43 min
Cha Cha Real Smooth	Comedy drama	June 17, 2022	June 17, 2022	1 h 47 min
Luck	Animated fantasy	August 5, 2022	—N/a	1 h 45 min
The Greatest Beer Run Ever	Biographical drama	September 30, 2022	September 23, 2022	2 h 6 min
Raymond & Ray	Comedy drama	October 21, 2022	October 14, 2022	1 h 40 min
Causeway	Drama	November 4, 2022	October 28, 2022	1 h 32 min
Spirited	Musical comedy	November 18, 2022	November 11, 2022	2 h 7 min
Emancipation	Historical thriller	December 9, 2022	December 2, 2022	2 h 12 min
Sharper	Psychological thriller	February 17, 2023	February 10, 2023	1 h 56 min
Tetris	Biographical drama	March 31, 2023	March 24, 2023	1 h 58 min
Ghosted	Romantic action adventure	April 21, 2023	—N/a	1 h 56 min
The Beanie Bubble	Comedy drama	July 28, 2023	July 21, 2023	1 h 50 min
Flora and Son	Musical drama	September 29, 2023	September 22, 2023	1 h 34 min
Fingernails	Science fiction romance	November 3, 2023	October 27, 2023	1 h 53 min
The Family Plan	Action comedy	December 15, 2023	—N/a	1 h 58 min
Killers of the Flower Moon (Note: Co-distributed with Paramount Pictures)	Historical crime drama	January 12, 2024	October 20, 2023	3 h 26 min
Napoleon	Epic historical drama	March 1, 2024	November 22, 2023	2 h 38 min
Argylle (Note: Co-distributed with Universal Pictures)	Spy action comedy	April 12, 2024	February 2, 2024	2 h 19 min
Fancy Dance	Drama	June 28, 2024	June 21, 2024	1 h 30 min
The Instigators	Heist thriller	August 9, 2024	August 2, 2024	1 h 41 min
Wolfs	Action comedy	September 27, 2024	September 20, 2024	1 h 48 min
Blitz	Historical drama	November 22, 2024	November 1, 2024	2 h
Fly Me to the Moon	Romantic comedy	December 6, 2024	July 12, 2024	2 h 12 min
The Gorge	Survival action	February 14, 2025	—N/a	2 h 7 min
Fountain of Youth	Heist adventure	May 23, 2025	—N/a	2 h 5 min
Echo Valley	Thriller	June 13, 2025	June 6, 2025	1 h 44 min
Highest 2 Lowest	Crime thriller	September 5, 2025	August 15, 2025	2 h 13 min
All of You	Romantic drama	September 26, 2025		1 h 38 min
The Lost Bus	Disaster drama	October 3, 2025	September 19, 2025	2 h 9 min
The Family Plan 2	Action comedy	November 21, 2025	—N/a	1 h 46 min
F1 (Note: Co-distributed with Warner Bros. Pictures)	Sports drama	December 12, 2025	June 27, 2025	2 h 36 min
Eternity (Note: distributed by A24; uncredited in advertising material during theatrical release)	Fantasy romantic comedy	February 13, 2026	November 26, 2025	1 h 54 min
Outcome	Black comedy	April 10, 2026	—N/a	1 h 23 min
Propeller One-Way Night Coach	Family adventure	May 29, 2026	—N/a	1 h 01 min
The Dink	Sports comedy	July 24, 2026	—N/a	1 h 42 min
Mayday	Action comedy	September 4, 2026	—N/a	1 h 50 min
Matchbox: The Movie	Action adventure comedy	October 9, 2026	—N/a	2 h 6 min
Tenzing	Biographical drama	October 16, 2026	October 9, 2026	2 h 5 min
Being Heumann	Biographical drama	November 13, 2026	November 6, 2026	2 h 7 min
Awaiting release
Way of the Warrior Kid	Coming-of-age drama	November 25, 2026	—N/a	1 h 46 min

=== Documentaries ===
Title	Subject	Apple TV release	Runtime
The Elephant Queen	Nature	November 1, 2019	1 h 36 min
Beastie Boys Story	Music group/Fly on the wall	April 24, 2020	2 h
Dads	Fatherhood	June 19, 2020	1 h 21 min
Boys State	Leadership	August 14, 2020	1 h 49 min
Bruce Springsteen's Letter to You	Music biopic	October 23, 2020	1 h 30 min
Fireball: Visitors from Darker Worlds	Nature	November 13, 2020	1 h 37 min
Billie Eilish: The World's a Little Blurry (Note: Co-distributed with Neon)	Music biopic	February 26, 2021	2 h 20 min
The Year Earth Changed	Nature	April 16, 2021	48 min
Fathom	Nature	June 25, 2021	1 h 26 min
Who Are You, Charlie Brown?	Biopic	June 25, 2021	54 min
9/11: Inside the President's War Room (Note: Co-distributed with BBC)	Reactions to the September 11 attacks	September 1, 2021	1 h 30 min
The Velvet Underground	Music group	October 15, 2021	2 h
Twas the Fight Before Christmas	Christmas	November 26, 2021	1 h 31 min
Sidney	Biopic	September 23, 2022	1 h 51 min
Louis Armstrong's Black & Blues	Music biopic	October 28, 2022	1 h 44 min
Selena Gomez: My Mind & Me	Mental health/Music biopic	November 4, 2022	1 h 35 min
Still: A Michael J. Fox Movie	Biopic/Parkinson's	May 12, 2023	1 h 34 min
Stephen Curry: Underrated	Sports biopic	July 21, 2023	1 h 49 min
The Pigeon Tunnel	Biopic	October 20, 2023	1 h 34 min
The Bloody Hundredth	100th Bombardment Group	March 15, 2024	1 h 2 min
Girls State	Female leadership	April 5, 2024	1 h 36 min
The Last of the Sea Women	Jeju Island freediving	October 11, 2024	1 h 26 min
Bread & Roses	Women in Afghanistan	November 22, 2024	1 h 30 min
Deaf President Now!	Deaf President Now protests	May 16, 2025	1 h 40 min
Bono: Stories of Surrender	Music biopic	May 30, 2025	1 h 26 min
Stiller & Meara: Nothing Is Lost	Biopic	October 24, 2025	1 h 37 min
Come See Me in the Good Light	Biographical documentary	November 14, 2025	1 h 49 min
The Last First: Winter K2	Mountaineering	October 2, 2026	TBA
Awaiting release
Fleetwood Mac: The Chain	Music biopic	January 29, 2027	TBA

=== Specials ===
Title	Genre	Apple TV release	Runtime
Here We Are: Notes for Living on Planet Earth	Animated short	April 17, 2020	36 min
Mariah Carey's Magical Christmas Special	Holiday special	December 4, 2020	43 min
The Boy, the Mole, the Fox and the Horse	Animated short	December 25, 2022	34 min
Hannah Waddingham: Home for Christmas	Musical holiday special	November 22, 2023	44 min
The Velveteen Rabbit	Animation/Live-action	November 22, 2023	44 min
Lulu Is a Rhinoceros	Animation	May 30, 2025	47 min

=== Shorts ===
Title	Genre	Apple TV release	Runtime
Blush	Animated short	October 1, 2021	10 min
Mariah's Christmas: The Magic Continues	Holiday special	December 3, 2021	18 min
Bad Luck Spot! (Note: In bonus content of Luck.)	Animated short	March 17, 2023	5 min

== Upcoming original films ==
=== Feature films ===
Title	Genre	Year	Status	Ref.
Snoopy Unleashed	Animated adventure	2027	In production	
This Is How It Goes	Psychological thriller	2027	Post-production	
Weekend Warriors	Sports comedy drama	2027	Post-production	
Greyhound 2	War	2027	Post-production	
Liminal	Science fiction action thriller	2027	Post-production	
Sponsor	Psychological thriller	2027	Completed	
What Happens at Night	Gothic psychological horror	2027	Post-production	
Running	Sports	TBA	Filming	
Foster the Snowman	Fantasy	TBA	Pre-production	
One Month Mark	Romantic comedy	TBA	Pre-production	
Untitled Lance Armstrong film	Biopic	TBA	Pre-production	
The Waffle House Index	Science fiction thriller	TBA	Pre-production	

=== Documentaries ===
Title	Subject	Apple TV release

=== In development ===
Title	Genre
Connector	Period drama
The Corsair Code	Science fiction mystery
Early Action	Action comedy
Five Secrets	Action
The Flick	Thriller
Jess & Pearl	Sports drama
Last Flight Out	Science fiction
Little Santa	Animated fantasy
Mistborn	Epic fantasy
Once and Again	Romance
Oregon Trail	Action comedy
The President Is Missing	Political thriller
Sacrament	Thriller
That Man from Rio	Adventure comedy
Two for the Money	Heist thriller
Untitled F1 sequel	Sports drama
Untitled Megan Park film	TBA
The Wives	Murder mystery

== See also ==
- List of Apple TV original programming
