= I'm Thinking of Ending Things =

2020 film by Charlie Kaufman

- Release poster
- Directed by: Charlie Kaufman
- Screenplay by: Charlie Kaufman
- Based on: I'm Thinking of Ending Things by Iain Reid
- Produced by: Anthony Bregman; Charlie Kaufman; Robert Salerno; Stefanie Azpiazu
- Starring: Jesse Plemons; Jessie Buckley; Toni Collette; David Thewlis
- Cinematography: Łukasz Żal
- Edited by: Robert Frazen
- Music by: Jay Wadley
- Production companies: Likely Story; Projective Testing Service
- Distributed by: Netflix
- Release dates: August 28, 2020 (theatrical); September 4, 2020 (Netflix)
- Running time: 134 minutes
- Country: United States
- Language: English

I'm Thinking of Ending Things (stylized as i'm thinking of ending things) is a 2020 American surrealist psychological thriller film written and directed by Charlie Kaufman, loosely adapted from the 2016 novel by Iain Reid. The plot follows a young woman (Jessie Buckley) who goes on a trip with her boyfriend (Jesse Plemons) to meet his parents (Toni Collette and David Thewlis). Throughout the film, the main narrative is intercut with footage of a school janitor (Guy Boyd) going to work, with both stories intersecting by the third act.

I'm Thinking of Ending Things was released in select theaters on August 28, 2020, and on Netflix on September 4, 2020. It received positive reviews from critics, who praised the two lead performances and the cinematography.

== Plot ==
Throughout the film, the main narrative is intercut with footage of an elderly janitor working at a high school, including scenes in which he sees students rehearsing Oklahoma! and watches a romantic comedy film.

A young woman (whose occupation and name change throughout) contemplates ending her relationship with her boyfriend Jake while on a trip to meet his parents at their farm. During the drive, Jake attempts to recite a poem he read when he was younger, "Ode: Intimations of Immortality", and asks her to recite an original poem of hers to pass time. After she recites a morbid poem about coming home, (Note: Which is later revealed to be "Bonedog", by the poet Eva H.D.) they arrive at the farmhouse. Jake takes her to the barn, where he recounts a story about the farm's pigs being eaten alive by maggots.

Upon entering the farmhouse, the woman notices scratches on the basement door. At dinner, she shows Jake's parents photographs of her landscape paintings and says she met Jake at a trivia night in a bar, with narrative inconsistencies. Later, she notices a childhood picture of Jake, but becomes confused after initially recognizing the child as herself. She receives a call from a friend with a female name, and a mysterious male voice explains that there is "one question to answer." Over the course of the night, Jake's parents transform into their younger and older selves, though nobody comments on this. When the woman takes a nightgown down to the basement to wash, she discovers several janitor uniforms in the washing machine and finds posters for Ralph Albert Blakelock exhibitions that have images of paintings seemingly identical to her own. She receives another call from the same mysterious voice.

On the drive home, Jake refers to several events that evening which the woman does not remember and then claims she drank a lot of wine. Word association leads to an extended critical discussion of John Cassavetes' A Woman Under the Influence. (Note: The young woman's monologue is taken directly from Pauline Kael's review of the film. A collection of her reviews (For Keeps: 30 Years at the Movies) can be seen in Jake's childhood home.) The couple stops at Tulsey Town, a drive-through ice cream stand, whose employees are students at the janitor's school. When the woman is leaving, an employee with a rash says they are scared for her.

Jake stops at his high school to throw the ice-cream cups away. After a heated argument in the parking lot about the lyrics of "Baby, It's Cold Outside", they kiss. Jake has a flashback of the janitor watching them from inside the school and decides to confront him, leaving the woman alone in the car. After speaking with herself about her relationship with Jake and contemplating whether she might die of hypothermia, the young woman accidentally locks herself out of the car, leading her to look for Jake inside the school. She meets the janitor and asks him where Jake is, but she cannot remember what Jake looks like. She tells the janitor that nothing happened between Jake and her on the night they met, instead claiming Jake made her uncomfortable by staring at her.

The woman discovers Jake at the end of a hall. They watch as people dressed like themselves and the janitor engage in dream ballet, (Note: Reminiscent of "Dream Ballet" performed in Oklahoma!. The ballet features the young woman's dancer taking the role of Laurey, Jake's dancer taking the role of Curly, and the janitor's dancer taking the role of Jud.) which ends when the janitor's dancer kills Jake's dancer with a knife.

Having finished his shift, the janitor enters his car, but does not start the motor. He experiences hallucinations of Jake's parents arguing and animated Tulsey Town commercials. The janitor then undresses and reenters the school, led by the hallucination of a maggot-infested pig who tells him that "someone has to be the pig infested with maggots," that "everything is the same, when you look close enough," and that he should get dressed.

On an auditorium stage, an old Jake receives a Nobel Prize (Note: The Nobel Prize acceptance speech is taken from John Nash's acceptance speech during the finale of A Beautiful Mind, the DVD of which is seen on a shelf in Jake's childhood bedroom.) and sings "Lonely Room" from Oklahoma! to an audience of people from his life, all of them in theatrical old-age makeup, who give him a standing ovation. The emotional Jake stands there to gaze upon the audience for a long time as the scene fades into solid blue.

In the final scene, the solid blue fades into a shot of the school parking lot the next morning, where the couple's car is absent, while the janitor's truck is still parked and now covered in snow. Towards the end of the credits, scraping sounds emanate from the engine of an approaching snowplow.

== Cast ==
- Jesse Plemons as Jake
  - Ryan Laughtner Steele as Dancing Jake
- Jessie Buckley as Young Woman (who is referred to by several names throughout the film, including Lucy, Louisa, Lucia, and Ames)
  - Unity Phelan as Dancing Young Woman
- Toni Collette as Mother
- David Thewlis as Father
- Guy Boyd as Janitor
  - Frederick E. Wodin as Dancing Janitor
- Hadley Robinson as Laurey (Note: In the high school stage production of Oklahoma! whose rehearsal the janitor watches.) and Tulsey Town Girl 1
- Gus Birney as Aunt Eller and Tulsey Town Girl 2
- Abby Quinn as Student (Note: Seen in a brief sequence with the janitor at the high school that, based on the students' clothing and hairstyles, appears to be set in the 1980s.) and Tulsey Town Girl 3
- Colby Minifie as Yvonne (Note: In the romantic comedy film the janitor watches.)
- Anthony Grasso as Diner Manager
- Teddy Coluca as Diner Customer
- Jason Ralph as Yvonne's Boyfriend
- Oliver Platt as The Voice (of the animated pig)

== Production ==
It was announced in January 2018 that Charlie Kaufman was adapting Iain Reid's novel I'm Thinking of Ending Things for Netflix, as well as directing. In December, Brie Larson and Jesse Plemons were cast in the film. In March 2019, Jessie Buckley, Toni Collette and David Thewlis joined the cast, with Buckley replacing Larson.

Principal photography began on March 13, 2019, in Fishkill, New York, and was completed on April 29. As of November 7, the film was in post-production.

== Release ==
I'm Thinking of Ending Things was released in select theaters on August 28, 2020, and on Netflix on September 4.

=== Critical reception ===
Review aggregator Rotten Tomatoes reports that 82% of 262 critic reviews are positive, with an average rating of 7.5/10; the critics' consensus for the film reads: "Aided by stellar performances from Jessie Buckley and Jesse Plemons, I'm Thinking of Ending Things finds writer-director Charlie Kaufman grappling with the human condition as only he can." On Metacritic, the film has a weighted average score of 78 out of 100 based on reviews from 46 critics, indicating "generally favorable" reviews.

Karen Han of Polygon wrote: "The lack of clear answers and structure can be frustrating, but the strange way the story is told enhances just how real the exchanges between characters feel. The frustration that Lucy feels with Jake, that Jake feels with his mother, that his parents feel for each other, are all uncomfortably tangible, especially as tensions rise. The film's 134-minute runtime is a long time to sit with that feeling, but Kaufman's big divergence from the novel he's adapting is in lending its ending a more buoyant note." In his review, Brian Tallerico of RogerEbert.com gave the film 3 1/2 out of 4 stars, calling it "a movie that is undeniably complex in terms of symbolism and a more surreal final act than most people will be expecting". He also praised the cinematography, saying that the film's atmosphere is "amplified by a tight 4:3 aspect ratio courtesy of Łukasz Żal (Cold War) that forces the viewer to pay more attention to what's in frame." The Observer's Wendy Ide wrote: "This is not cinema that leaves you feeling good about things. Nor does it tread a familiar path. But I'm Thinking of Ending Things is one of the most daringly unexpected films of the year, a sinewy, unsettling psychological horror, saturated with a squirming dream logic that tips over into the domain of nightmares."

In a more mixed review, Adam Graham of The Detroit News gave the film a C, calling Plemons's and Buckley's performances excellent, but lamenting the plot, writing: "I'm Thinking of Ending Things is an unsolvable riddle where the only answer is mankind's hopelessness, and we've been down this road before." For TIME, Stephanie Zacharek wrote: "For every moment of raw, affecting insight there are zillions of milliseconds of Kaufman's proving what a tortured smartie he is. I'm Thinking of Ending Things must have been arduous to make, and it's excruciatingly tedious to watch."

In June 2025, IndieWire ranked the film at number 22 on its list of "The 100 Best Movies of the 2020s (So Far)."

=== Accolades ===
Award	Date of ceremony	Category	Recipient(s)	Result	Ref.
Art Directors Guild Awards	April 10, 2021	Excellence in Production Design for a Contemporary Film	Molly Hughes	Nominated	
Boston Society of Film Critics Awards	December 13, 2020	Best Screenplay	Charlie Kaufman	Won	
Boston Society of Film Critics Awards	December 13, 2020	Best Editing	Robert Frazen	Won	
Chicago Film Critics Association	December 21, 2020	Best Actress	Jessie Buckley	Nominated	
Chicago Film Critics Association	December 21, 2020	Best Supporting Actress	Toni Collette	Nominated	
Chicago Film Critics Association	December 21, 2020	Best Adapted Screenplay	Charlie Kaufman	Nominated	
Chicago Film Critics Association	December 21, 2020	Best Art Direction	Molly Hughes	Nominated	
Chicago Film Critics Association	December 21, 2020	Best Use of Visual Effects		Nominated	
Chicago Film Critics Association	December 21, 2020	Best Editing	Robert Frazen	Won	
Dublin Film Critics' Circle	December 18, 2020	Best Actress	Jessie Buckley	Won	
Florida Film Critics Circle	December 21, 2020	Best Adapted Screenplay	Charlie Kaufman	Won	
Gotham Independent Film Awards	January 11, 2021	Best Actress	Jessie Buckley	Nominated	
Gotham Independent Film Awards	January 11, 2021	Best Actor	Jesse Plemons	Nominated	
IndieWire Critics Poll	December 14, 2020	Best Film	I'm Thinking of Ending Things	5th place	
IndieWire Critics Poll	December 14, 2020	Best Director	Charlie Kaufman	7th place	
IndieWire Critics Poll	December 14, 2020	Best Performance	Jessie Buckley	6th place	
IndieWire Critics Poll	December 14, 2020	Best Screenplay	Charlie Kaufman	Won	
IndieWire Critics Poll	December 14, 2020	Best Cinematography	Łukasz Żal	6th place	
London Film Critics' Circle	February 7, 2021	Film of the Year	I'm Thinking of Ending Things	Nominated	
London Film Critics' Circle	February 7, 2021	British/Irish Actress of the Year	Jessie Buckley	Nominated	
London Film Critics' Circle	February 7, 2021	Screenwriter of the Year	Charlie Kaufman	Nominated	
National Society of Film Critics	January 9, 2021	Best Screenplay	Charlie Kaufman	3rd place	
Online Film Critics Society	January 25, 2021	Best Picture	I'm Thinking of Ending Things	8th Place	
Online Film Critics Society	January 25, 2021	Best Actress	Jessie Buckley	Nominated	
Online Film Critics Society	January 25, 2021	Best Adapted Screenplay	Charlie Kaufman	Nominated	
San Diego Film Critics Society	January 11, 2021	Best Adapted Screenplay	Charlie Kaufman	Nominated	
San Diego Film Critics Society	January 11, 2021	Best Production Design	Molly Hughes	Nominated	
San Francisco Bay Area Film Critics Circle	January 18, 2021	Best Adapted Screenplay	Charlie Kaufman	Nominated	
San Francisco Bay Area Film Critics Circle	January 18, 2021	Best Supporting Actress	Toni Collette	Nominated	
Set Decorators Society of America Awards	March 31, 2021	Best Achievement in Décor/Design of a Contemporary Feature Film	Mattie Siegal and Molly Hughes	Nominated	
St. Louis Film Critics Association	January 17, 2021	Best Film	I'm Thinking of Ending Things	Nominated	
St. Louis Film Critics Association	January 17, 2021	Best Actress	Jessie Buckley	Nominated	
St. Louis Film Critics Association	January 17, 2021	Best Adapted Screenplay	Charlie Kaufman	Won	
St. Louis Film Critics Association	January 17, 2021	Best Editing	Robert Frazen	Nominated	
Washington D.C. Area Film Critics Association	February 8, 2021	Best Adapted Screenplay	Charlie Kaufman	Nominated	

== See also ==
- List of films featuring fictional films
