= Iain Reid =

Canadian writer

- Born: 1981 (age 44–45); Ottawa, Ontario, Canada
- Education: Queen's University
- Occupations: Novelist, memoirist, screenwriter
- Writing career
- Period: 2010s–present
- Notable works: The Truth About Luck (2013); I'm Thinking of Ending Things (2016); Foe (2018); We Spread (2022)
- Notable awards: RBC Taylor Emerging Writer Award (2015)

Iain Reid (born 1981) is a Canadian writer. Winner of the RBC Taylor Emerging Writer Award in 2015, Reid is the author of I'm Thinking of Ending Things (2016) and Foe (2018).

== Writing career ==
=== Newspaper and magazine writing ===
Reid established his writing career by publishing articles and columns in national magazines and newspapers after graduating from Queen's University in Kingston, Ontario. He drew the National Post's attention, garnering a weekly column assignment. In 2015, his work began appearing in The New Yorker.

=== Memoirs ===
Reid's first memoir, One Bird's Choice: A Year in the Life of an Over-educated, Underemployed Twentysomething Who Moves Back Home, was published in 2010, and was followed by The Truth About Luck: What I Learned on my Road Trip with Grandma in 2013.

=== Novels and film adaptations ===
His debut novel, I'm Thinking of Ending Things, was published in 2016. Academy Award winner Charlie Kaufman adapted the novel into a film for Netflix in 2020. Kaufman consulted with Reid while he was preparing the adaptation, and Reid was an executive producer for the film.

Reid's second novel, Foe, was published by Simon and Schuster in 2018. Anonymous Content purchased the book's film rights, and filming began in Australia in January 2022. Reid co-wrote the screenplay with director Garth Davis. The film stars Saoirse Ronan and Paul Mescal, with an expected theatrical release in October 2023 before it is available for streaming on Amazon Prime.

Reid's third novel, We Spread, was published by Scout Press in September 2022. The novel was shortlisted for the Governor General's Award for English-language fiction at the 2023 Governor General's Awards. Reid is writing the screenplay for the film adaptation with director Minhal Baig.

== Personal life ==
Reid lives in Kingston, Ontario. He is a 2004 graduate of Queen's University at Kingston, where he studied history and journalism. His father, Hugh Reid, is an English professor at Carleton University. His brother, Ewan Reid, is the Founder and CEO of Mission Control Space Services (Mission Control), His sister Eliza Reid was the First Lady of Iceland from 2016 to 2024, and his brother-in-law is Guðni Th. Jóhannesson, the former President of Iceland.

== Works ==
=== Novels ===
- I'm Thinking of Ending Things. Scout Press/Simon & Schuster, 2016.
- Foe. Scout Press/Simon & Schuster, 2018.
- We Spread. Scout Press/Simon & Schuster, 2022.

=== Memoirs ===
- One Bird's Choice: A Year in the Life of an Over-educated, Underemployed Twentysomething Who Moves Back Home. House of Anansi Press, 2010.
- The Truth About Luck: What I Learned on my Road Trip with Grandma. House of Anansi Press, 2013.

=== Newspaper and magazine writing ===
- Weekly column for the National Post.
- Contributions to The New Yorker, beginning in 2015.

=== Film ===
- I'm Thinking of Ending Things (2020) – Executive producer.
- Foe (2023) – Screenplay co-written with Garth Davis.
- We Spread (announced) – Screenplay in development with Minhal Baig.

== Awards and honours ==
- 2015 – Won the RBC Taylor Emerging Writer Award.
- 2023 – Shortlisted for the Governor General's Award for English-language fiction for We Spread.
