= I'm Thinking of Ending Things (novel) =

2016 novel by Iain Reid

- First edition cover
- Author: Iain Reid
- Language: English
- Genres: Psychological thriller, horror
- Publisher: Simon & Schuster
- Publication date: June 14, 2016
- Publication place: United States
- Pages: 224 (hardback)
- ISBN: 978-1501126925
- OCLC: 953991344
- Dewey Decimal: 813/.6—dc23
- LC Class: PR9199.4.R455 I6 2016

I'm Thinking of Ending Things is the 2016 debut novel of Canadian writer Iain Reid. It was first published in June 2016 in the United States by Simon & Schuster. The book has been described as a psychological thriller and horror fiction, and it is about a young woman who has many doubts about her relationship with her boyfriend. In spite of her reservations, she takes a road trip with him to meet his parents.

The novel was selected by National Public Radio as one of the best books of 2016, was a finalist in the 2016 Shirley Jackson Award, and appeared on the 2017 Ottawa Independent Writers Frank Hegyi Award for Emerging Authors longlist. In 2020, Netflix released a film adaptation of the book, written and directed by Charlie Kaufman and starring Jesse Plemons, Jessie Buckley, Toni Collette, and David Thewlis.

== Plot summary ==
The story is narrated by Jake's unnamed girlfriend of only a few months. They met in a pub during a college trivia night, and Jake gave her his phone number by writing it on a piece of paper and slipping it into her bag. Several weeks later, he takes her to meet his parents on their remote farm. She has been considering "ending things", but has not told him yet. It is a long drive, and they engage in lengthy philosophical discussions.

The evening with Jake's parents turns out to be unpleasant and scary. They ask her awkward questions, and she sees unsettling things, like a picture of Jake as a child that looks as if it could be her. During the long drive home, Jake decides to stop at a Dairy Queen, to which the narrator reluctantly agrees. She recognizes one of the girls who works at the Dairy Queen, but can't pinpoint why. After getting back on the road, Jake wants to dispose of their trash at a nearby deserted high school. After doing so, he starts making out with her in the car in front of the school, but stops due to a flashback memory where he sees the janitor watching them from one of the windows. Furious, Jake leaves her alone in the car and enters the school building to confront him.

After a long wait in the cold car, Jake's girlfriend goes looking for him. She searches the long corridors in the main building, before realizing that she is being followed. Believing it to be the janitor, she tries to hide and quickly gets lost. Jake's girlfriend relives traumatic childhood experiences of a neighbor visiting her mother and threatening to take her away. Frightened, she wishes she had ended things with Jake. At this point, the narration begins to become more fractious and disjointed, with the narrator losing sight of their identities. The narrator remembers where the gym is, even though she has never been to the school before. Making her way there, hoping to find a way out, she starts to physically deteriorate, and she begins referring to herself using the plural "we", rather than "I". It soon becomes apparent that the narrator and Jake are, in fact, the same person.

The narrator, now an amalgam of different people, makes their way to the janitor's room and climbs into the closet. They recall how they wished they had given the woman in the pub their phone number that trivia night, but they were too shy. Jake hoped to meet her again, but that never happened. Instead, he wrote about her to live out their relationship as a maladaptive fantasy. The narrator ends up suffering a breakdown, once his fantasy breaks down. The janitor, revealed to be a middle-aged Jake, finds them in his room. He gives the narrator a metal clothes hanger from the closet and says, "I'm thinking of ending things." The narrator agrees, straightens the hanger out, and stabs themself in the neck with the sharp end. As they bleed to death, from their injuries, the narrator refers to themself as "a single unit, back to one. Me. Only me. Jake. Alone again".

Many of the chapters of the book are separated by conversations between two strangers who discuss a horrific incident that occurred at the school, which is implied to be a murder, but later is revealed to be a suicide. Near the end of the book, it is revealed they are talking about Jake. Jake was a student who dropped out of college 30 years ago, and was employed at the school as a janitor. They talk about how he came from a farm and that his parents had died long ago. They note how withdrawn and disturbed he became and that he used to spend much of his time on his own, writing in notebooks. They discuss the discovery of his body and the notebooks, and only when they read them do they understand what happened.

== Background ==
Reid told interviewers it took him about three years to write the book, although ideas for the story had been with him for far longer. He drew on his experiences growing up on a farm in remote Ontario, as well as travelling Canadian country roads, in total darkness. Reid said that he left the novel's ending open to interpretation, and that while he has his own explanation about what the ending means, other interpretations are all "totally valid". He added that he appreciates books that "put some of the onus onto me to decipher and complete the story.”

After Reid had finished the novel, he had trouble finding someone who would publish it. He recalled, "Just about everyone in Canada rejected it, until Simon and Schuster made a modest offer." The book went on to be listed on The New York Times Best Seller list, was translated into over twenty languages, and was made into a film.

== Reception ==
In a review in the Chicago Tribune, Lloyd Sachs described I'm Thinking of Ending Things as "the boldest and most original literary thriller to appear in some time". He called Reid "a master of tension", and noted that despite the book's "philosophic weight", he "pulls it off". Sachs recommended re-reading the book, saying that "[w]ith its deep enigmas" and the "dense psychological space [the characters are] traveling through", it "remains as full of dark surprises as your friendly neighborhood black hole".

Hannah Pittard wrote in a review in The New York Times that she felt the novel's "bait-and-switch tactic"—interspacing the Jake-and-girlfriend narrative with a commentary between two strangers about an unspecified tragedy—too "gimmicky". She also felt that Reid's story was a little too non-diegetic, in that the narrator withholds too much from the reader. Pittard expressed her disappointment at the book's "big reveal" at the end, saying that it "hastily disposes of unexplained and unnecessary red herrings, and the revelation is, at once, too tidy and too convenient to be satisfying".

Writing in The Australian, author Pip Smith said the novel "reads like a short story, with its elastic stretched to snapping point". She said that while it has all the ingredients of a good thriller, with mounting tension and a twist at the end, Reid "sells his concept short" by sticking to the thriller format. Smith was critical of Reid's portrayal of Jake's girlfriend as having "inferior intelligence.” She acknowledged that by the end of the book, it becomes clear that the author was not trying to create "a believable female character, but a misanthropic male's fantasy of a female character.” However, until the twist, readers "have spent 200 pages with a narrator who is structurally obliged to sound unintelligent". Smith felt that "Reid's novel is about being trapped by intelligence, social awkwardness, and a fantasy of what could have been, but his novel is also trapped by its own lure, with a narrator too flimsy to feel real." She concluded that re-reading the book gives the text new meaning but added that many people will only read it once, and will miss Reid's "provocations about predetermination and free will".
