= Sideways (novel) =

2004 novel by Rex Pickett

- Cover to an early edition
- Author: Rex Pickett
- Language: English
- Genre: Fiction, comedy
- Publisher: St. Martin's Griffin
- Publication date: June 2004
- Publication place: United States
- Media type: Print (Paperback) also Audio Book
- Pages: 368 pp (paperback edition)
- ISBN: 0-312-32466-9 (paperback edition)
- OCLC: 53951011
- Dewey Decimal: 813/.6 22
- LC Class: PS3566.I316 S55 2004
- Followed by: Vertical

Sideways is a 2004 novel by Rex Pickett. The novel is the first in the Sideways Series.

== Plot ==
The novel is the story of two friends, Miles and Jack, who take a road trip to the Santa Ynez Valley AVA a week before Jack plans to marry. Miles is a recently divorced wine aficionado who struggles to publish his novels. Jack is a charismatic television director who is determined to engage in a short affair before his marriage.

== Film adaptation ==
In 2004, the novel was made into a film, Sideways, directed by Alexander Payne. The film received critical acclaim, and won the Academy Award for Best Adapted Screenplay in addition to being nominated for Best Picture, Best Director, Best Supporting Actor (Thomas Haden Church) and Best Supporting Actress (Virginia Madsen).

== Sequels ==
A self-published sequel to the original novel entitled Vertical and written by Rex Pickett was released in September 2010. Payne has indicated that he is not interested in directing a sequel to the film based on Vertical. Fox Searchlight owns the rights to the characters, but Payne's lack of interest makes the film a non-starter for Fox.

A third novel, entitled Sideways 3 Chile, focuses on Chilean wineries and was published in 2015.

A fourth novel, entitled Sideways New Zealand, was published in 2024.

== Stage adaptation ==
A straight play adaptation of the novel is available for licensing from Concord Theatricals. The show premiered at the La Jolla Playhouse in 2013.

== Stage musical adaptation ==
A musical adaptation of the novel premiered in 2021. The show has a book by Pickett with music by Anthony Leigh Adams and lyrics by Pickett and Adams.
