= Rex Pickett =

American novelist and filmmaker

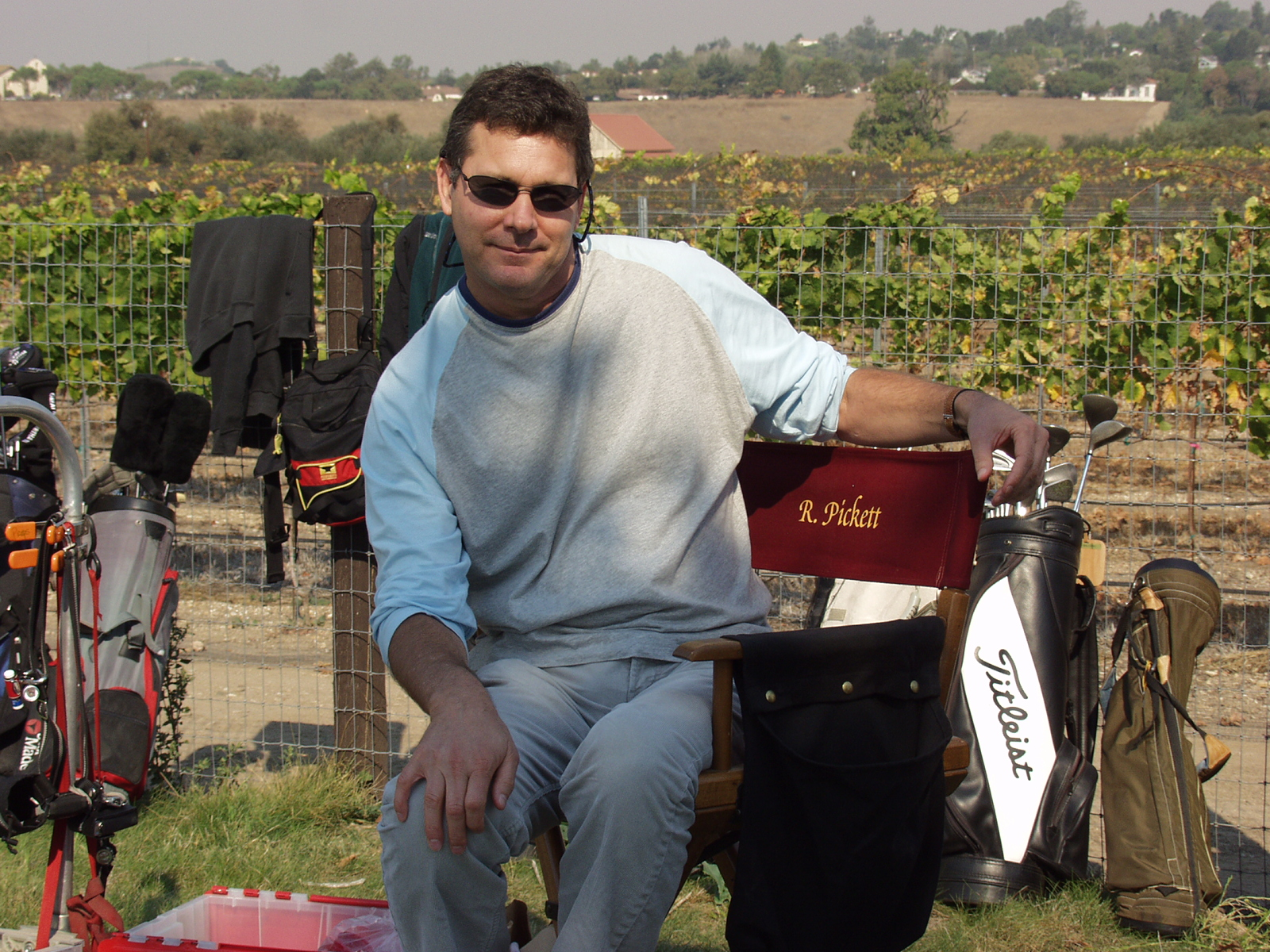
- Rex Pickett on the set of Sideways
- Born: July 9, 1956 (age 70); Merced, California, U.S.
- Education: University of California, San Diego (BA)
- Occupations: Screenwriter; novelist; playwright; film director
- Spouse: Joy Murphy (m. 2024)
- Writing career
- Genres: Fiction, comedy, film, theatre
- Website: rexpickettbooks.com

Rex Pickett (born July 9, 1952) is an American novelist and filmmaker best known for his novel Sideways, which was adapted into a 2004 movie of the same name directed by Alexander Payne.

== Career ==
=== Education and early career ===
Pickett was born at Castle Air Force Base in Merced, California, and grew up in San Diego. He attended the University of California, San Diego where he was a Special Projects major, specializing in contemporary literary and film criticism and creative writing. He graduated summa cum laude, then moved to Los Angeles to attend the graduate program at USC School of Cinematic Arts. He dropped out in the early 1980s and, with his then-wife, Barbara Schock, wrote and directed two independent feature films, California Without End and From Hollywood to Deadwood. California Without End was sold to Bavarian Radio Television, a German television station, and From Hollywood to Deadwood to Island Pictures.

Pickett returned to writing, landing a job as a writer on David Fincher's first feature, Alien 3. In 1998 he wrote the screenplay for My Mother Dreams the Satan's Disciples in New York, which went on to win the Academy Award for Best Live Action Short in 1999.

=== Novels and Sideways ===
In the 1990s, Pickett began writing novels and his first, a mystery titled La Purisima, didn't sell. His second was Sideways. Completed in 1999, the novel was submitted to both publishers and film production companies. After 18 rejection letters from publishers, Pickett's agent pulled it from submission. Film production companies also passed. In late 1999, nearly a year after it had been written, one of the submissions by Pickett's agent, Jess Taylor, at Endeavor, went to Alexander Payne's agent, David Lonner at the same agency. Payne's assistant, Brian Beery, read it then passed it to Payne who immediately optioned it. Shortly after Payne optioned Sideways it was greenlit by Artisan Entertainment. Pickett's agent at Curtis Brown went back out to publishers in a mass submission but it was again rejected. Eventually, Payne would put Sideways on hold and go off to make About Schmidt.

In early 2003, Payne, fresh from the success of About Schmidt, returned his attention to Sideways. The project was greenlit by Fox Searchlight, who gained control of it from Artisan in July 2003 and a start date announced for late September. After more than 100 rejection letters, Pickett's new agent at Trident Media Group went back out with his still unpublished novel and ended up selling it in a fire sale to St. Martin's Press for $5,000. It was published in June 2004, four months before the film was released.

Sideways the film was released on October 22, 2004. It went on to win over 350 awards from various critics and awards organizations, including 6 Broadcast Film Critics Association Awards, 5 New York Film Critics Circle Awards, 5 Los Angeles Film Critics Association Awards, 6 Indie Spirit Awards, 2 Golden Globes, et al. It was nominated for five Academy Awards, winning in the Best Adapted Screenplay category. The film had an impact on the sales of two types of California wine, driving Pinot noir sales and decreasing Merlot, the grape variety the main character, Miles, expressed hatred for.

In 2011, Pickett released a sequel to Sideways, titled Vertical. That same year it won the gold medal for Popular Fiction from the Independent Publisher Book Awards.

In 2012 Pickett staged a play version of his novel Sideways at the Ruskin Group Theater in Santa Monica, California. It ran for six months and a production was later staged at the La Jolla Playhouse under the direction of Des McAnuff.

Pickett spent a year traveling in Chile, New York, and Costa Rica before completing Sideways 3 Chile, set in the Chilean wine world. It was published in 2015.

In 2024 a fourth novel in the series was released, Sideways New Zealand.

== Stage and musical adaptions ==
In 2019 it was announced that Sideways was scheduled to be adapted for a Broadway musical. A play adapted by author Rex Pickett from the Sideways novel was produced at multiple theaters in the United States and the United Kingdom, including at the La Jolla Playhouse.

In addition to the musical, it was reported that Rex Pickett had written screenplays based on his two Sideways sequels already in print, Vertical and Sideways 3 Chile.

== Filmography ==
=== Director ===
- California Without End (1984) (Bavarian Radio Television)
- From Hollywood to Deadwood (1989) (theatrically released by Island Pictures)

=== Screenplays ===
- California Without End (1984)
- From Hollywood to Deadwood (1989)
- My Mother Dreams the Satan's Disciples in New York (1998)
- Repairman (2010) (as writer/director/producer)

=== Editor ===
- California Without End (1984)

== Novels ==
- Sideways (2004)
- Vertical (2011)
- Sideways 3 Chile (2015)
- Sideways New Zealand (2024)
