= Alexander Payne =

American filmmaker (born 1961)

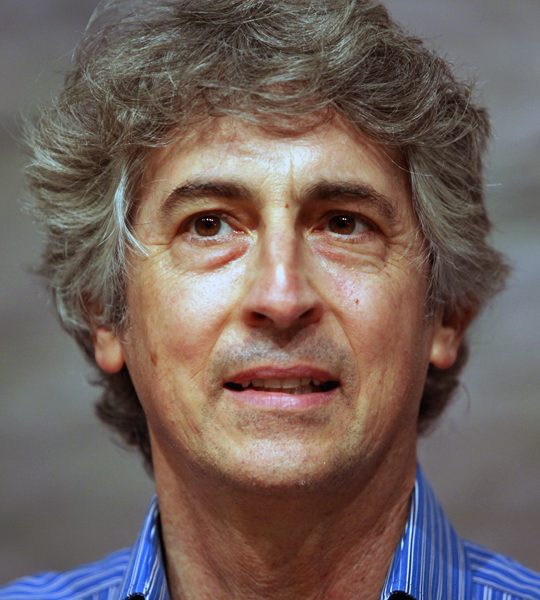
- Payne in 2017
- Born: Constantine Alexander Payne; February 10, 1961 (age 65); Omaha, Nebraska, U.S.
- Citizenship: United States; Greece
- Education: Stanford University (BA); University of California, Los Angeles (MFA)
- Occupations: Film director; screenwriter; producer
- Years active: 1985–present
- Spouses: Sandra Oh (m. 2003; div. 2006); Maria Kontos (m. 2015; div. 2022)
- Children: 1
- Awards: Full list

Constantine Alexander Payne (born February 10, 1961) is an American filmmaker. He is noted for his satirical depictions of contemporary American society. Payne has received numerous accolades, including two Academy Awards, a BAFTA Award, and two Golden Globe Awards, as well as a nomination for a Grammy Award.

After directing several short films, Payne made his feature film debut with the black comedy Citizen Ruth (1996). His career progressed with the political satire Election (1999), for which he received a nomination for the Academy Award for Best Adapted Screenplay, and the comedy-drama About Schmidt (2002). Payne twice won the Academy Award for Best Adapted Screenplay for co-writing his directorials Sideways (2004) and The Descendants (2011). He was also nominated for the Academy Award for Best Director for these two films and for the road film Nebraska (2013). He has since directed the comedy-dramas Downsizing (2017) and The Holdovers (2023). As of January 2026, Payne is directing a Danish-language comedy-drama, Somewhere Out There.

== Early life and education ==
Constantine Alexander Payne was born on February 10, 1961 in Omaha, Nebraska, to Peggy and George Payne, restaurant owners. He is the youngest of three sons and grew up in the Dundee neighborhood. He is of Greek ancestry. Payne's paternal grandfather, Nicholas "Nick" Payne, anglicized the last name from "Papadopoulos". His family comes from three areas in Greece: the island of Syros, Livadia, and Aegio. Payne's family was part of the fabric of Omaha, which he refers to as part of his upbringing. His grandfather was a founder of The Virginia Cafe, with Payne's father taking over the restaurant. Payne went there regularly as a child. The restaurant was destroyed in a fire in 1969; the W. Dale Clark Library was later built on the site. Payne's paternal grandmother, Clara Payne (née Hoffman), was from a German Nebraska family from Lincoln, Nebraska.

In the 1960s, Payne's father received a Super 8mm projector from Kraft Foods as a loyalty reward, and eventually passed it on to his son when Alexander was about 14 years old.

In Omaha, Payne attended Brownell-Talbot School, Dundee Elementary School, and Lewis and Clark Junior High. He graduated from Creighton Prep for high school in 1979. At Prep, Payne wrote a humor column for his high school newspaper and was the editor of the high school yearbook. Payne then attended Stanford University, where he majored in Spanish and History. As a part of his Spanish degree, he studied at Spain's University of Salamanca. He later lived a few months in Medellín, Colombia, where he published an article about social changes between 1900 and 1930.

Payne received his MFA in 1990 from the UCLA Film School, where he created a thesis film called The Passion of Martin.

== Career ==
=== 1985–1996: Short films and film debut ===
After his successful thesis film The Passion of Martin had attracted industry attention, Payne signed a writing/directing deal with Universal Pictures. The ensuing screenplay, which was turned down, ultimately became About Schmidt. He says that he cleared about $60,000, which was enough to fund his simple lifestyle at the time for about five years. Payne has said he sees his talent as being one of learned economy, referring to the essay "The Catastrophe of Success", written by Tennessee Williams. During this time Payne worked in various capacities on films and television including directing several films for the Playboy channel.

Payne co-wrote and directed his first full-length film, Citizen Ruth, which was released in 1996. The film is a satirical black comedy revolving around the issue of abortion rights. The film stars Laura Dern as a dim-witted woman with substance abuse issues who happens to get pregnant. She unexpectedly becomes a pawn of figures from both sides of the abortion debate. The film co-stars Kelly Preston, Burt Reynolds, and Tippi Hedren. The film premiered at the 1996 Sundance Film Festival where it received favorable reviews. Janet Maslin of The New York Times wrote, "There's no easy way out of this predicament, though Mr. Payne does beg the question with skill. And Citizen Ruth can easily be forgiven for not finding a fully satisfying ending. It delivers more than enough lively, gutsy satire along the way."

=== 1999–2013: Breakthrough and acclaim ===
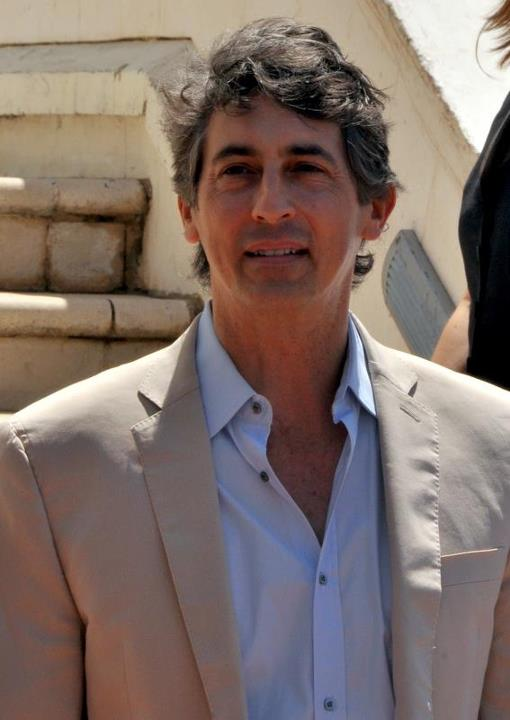
Payne at the Cannes Film Festival in 2012

His second film, Election, starring Matthew Broderick and Reese Witherspoon, which takes aim at politics and education in America, attracted attention when New Yorker film critic David Denby named it the best film of 1999. Payne received his first Academy Award for Writing Adapted Screenplay nomination for Election. Roger Ebert gave the film three and a half stars out of four, praising Witherspoon and Payne, and saying, "...here is a movie that is not simply about an obnoxious student, but also about an imperfect teacher, a lockstep administration, and a student body that is mostly just marking time until it can go out into the world and occupy valuable space". The film became a cult classic, ranking at #61 on Bravo's "100 Funniest Movies" and #9 on Entertainment Weekly's list of the "50 Best High School Movies", while Witherspoon's performance was ranked at #45 on the list of the "100 Greatest Film Performances of All Time" by Premiere. According to Payne, it is also President Barack Obama's favorite political film.

In 2000, Payne completed an uncredited polish-up of the screenplay for the comedy film Meet the Parents. In 2001, Payne wrote a draft of Jurassic Park III. In 2002, Payne's film About Schmidt, about a recently retired widower who embarks on a journey to his estranged daughter's wedding, was released. The film starred Jack Nicholson as the title character, Warren Schmidt, and its script was based on the novel of the same name by Louis Begley. The film also co-starred Hope Davis, Dermot Mulroney, June Squibb, and Kathy Bates. The film premiered at the 55th Cannes Film Festival to rave reviews, with critics highlighting Nicholson's performance. Payne received a Golden Globe for the screenplay, which was also nominated for a Writers Guild of America Award for Best Adapted Screenplay. To the surprise of many who kept track of Hollywood news, Payne and Jim Taylor were not nominated for an Oscar for the About Schmidt screenplay.

In 2004, Payne followed About Schmidt with Sideways, a film about two middle-aged men who embark on a week-long road trip to Santa Barbara County wine country to celebrate Jack's upcoming wedding. The film stars Paul Giamatti and Thomas Hayden Church as the two friends, with Virginia Madsen and Sandra Oh. The film premiered at the Toronto International Film Festival where it received rave reviews. Roger Ebert of the Chicago Sun-Times gave the film four stars, saying: "what happens during the seven days adds up to the best human comedy of the year – comedy, because it is funny, and human, because it is surprisingly moving." Payne won both the Academy Award and Golden Globe in 2005 for Best Adapted Screenplay, while the film also won the Golden Globe Award for Best Motion Picture – Musical or Comedy. In total, Sideways received five Academy Award nominations including Best Picture.

In 2007 Payne served as an executive producer on the films King of California and The Savages. He also collaborated once again with writing partner Jim Taylor to write a draft of the screenplay for the film I Now Pronounce You Chuck and Larry (2007), a comedy directed by Dennis Dugan, and starring Adam Sandler and Kevin James. Payne disliked the final product, stating that Adam Sandler rewrote so much of the story that almost all of what Payne and Taylor wrote was gone.

In 2009, Payne signed a petition calling for the release of film director Roman Polanski, who had been arrested in Switzerland in relation to his 1977 charge for drugging and raping a 13-year-old girl.

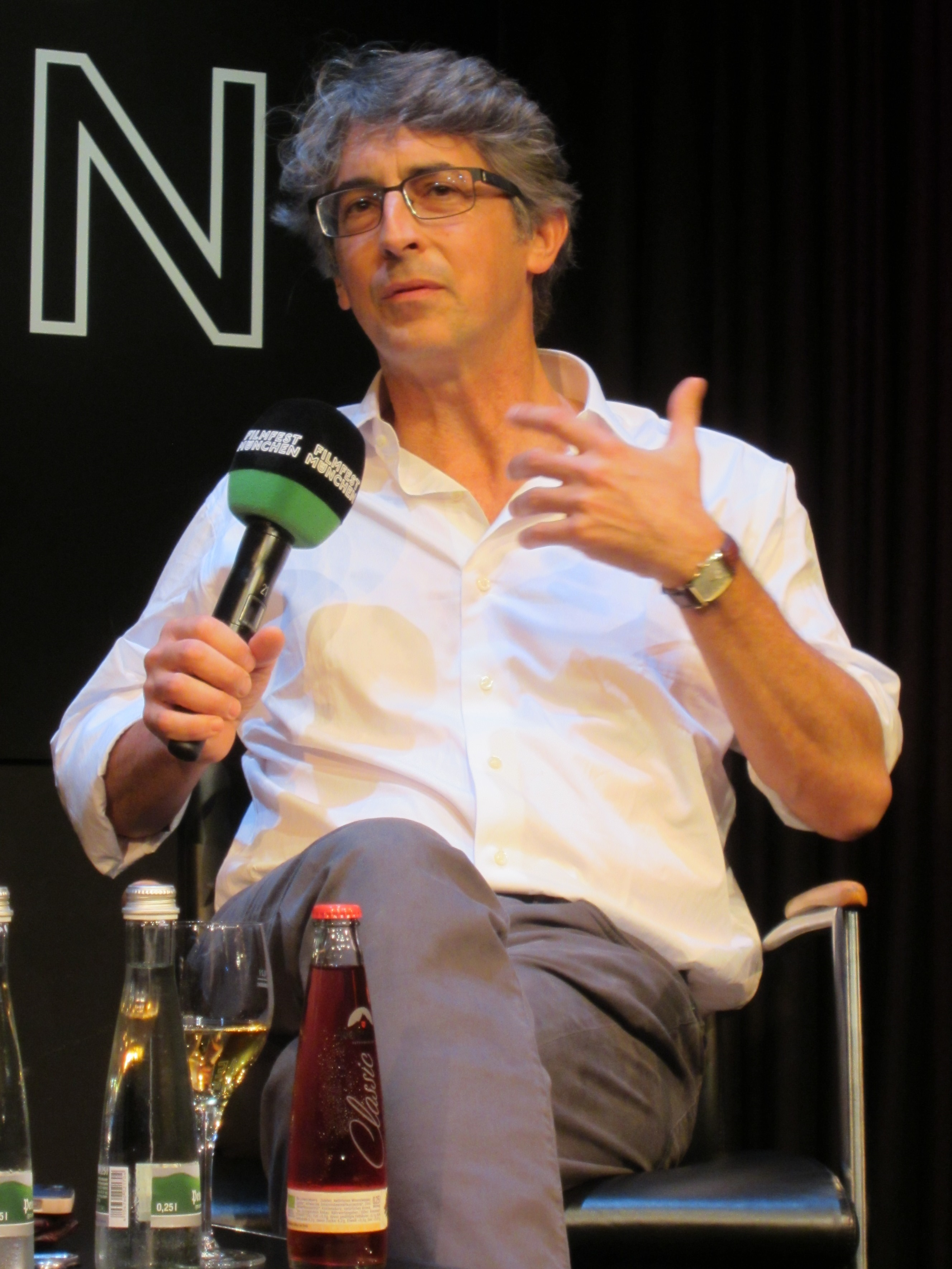
Payne at the Munich Film Festival (2015)

Payne returned to directing in 2011 after a seven-year hiatus with the film The Descendants, a film about a man dealing with the aftermath of a boating accident involving his wife, leaving her in a coma. The film starred George Clooney, Shailene Woodley, Beau Bridges, Judy Greer, Matthew Lillard, and Robert Forster. The film premiered at the 2011 Toronto International Film Festival where it received near universal praise ending up on many critics' top 10 list of the year. Critics also hailed George Clooney's performance with many citing it as his best. Peter Bradshaw of The Guardian praised Payne as a director writing, "Payne knows the difference between lightness and frivolity, between seriousness and solemnity, between different kinds of cloud...Within a single scene the film can tap into deep feelings of pain, switch into comic modes as various as farce and satire, and confront and evade moral challenges." Payne also co-wrote the screenplay along with Nat Faxon, and Jim Rash who all won the Academy Award for Best Adapted Screenplay.

Payne executive produced the short film Run Fast. Anna Musso, his long-time assistant and protégé, wrote and directed the film, which shot in March 2014. The project was partially funded by a Kickstarter campaign. Payne was also executive producer of the acclaimed 2014 film Kumiko, the Treasure Hunter directed by David Zellner. Payne's Nebraska starred veteran character actor Bruce Dern (who received the Cannes Film Festival Award for Best Actor) and Saturday Night Live alumnus Will Forte. It was released on November 15, 2013. The film received critical acclaim with David Edlestein of NPR describing it as a "superb balancing act" and adding, "it's a special kind of triumph". The film was nominated for the Academy Award for Best Picture with Payne receiving a Best Director nomination, ultimately losing to Alfonso Cuarón for Gravity.

=== 2017–2022: Career slump ===
Payne has said that during his seven-year hiatus between Sideways (2004) and The Descendants (2011), he, along with working partner Jim Taylor, were developing the satire Downsizing, which Payne has described as "a large canvas, science-fiction social satire" and "an epic masterpiece." The film, about an impoverished married couple who decide the way ahead lies in shrinking themselves, was to star Paul Giamatti and Reese Witherspoon, but was superseded by The Descendants and Nebraska. In March 2016, Witherspoon was replaced by Kristen Wiig and Giamatti by Matt Damon. Hong Chau, Christoph Waltz, Udo Kier, Neil Patrick Harris, and Jason Sudeikis also starred. Paramount Pictures released the film on December 22, 2017. It has received mixed reviews, with many critics describing it as the weakest film of Payne's career.

=== 2023–present: Resurgence ===
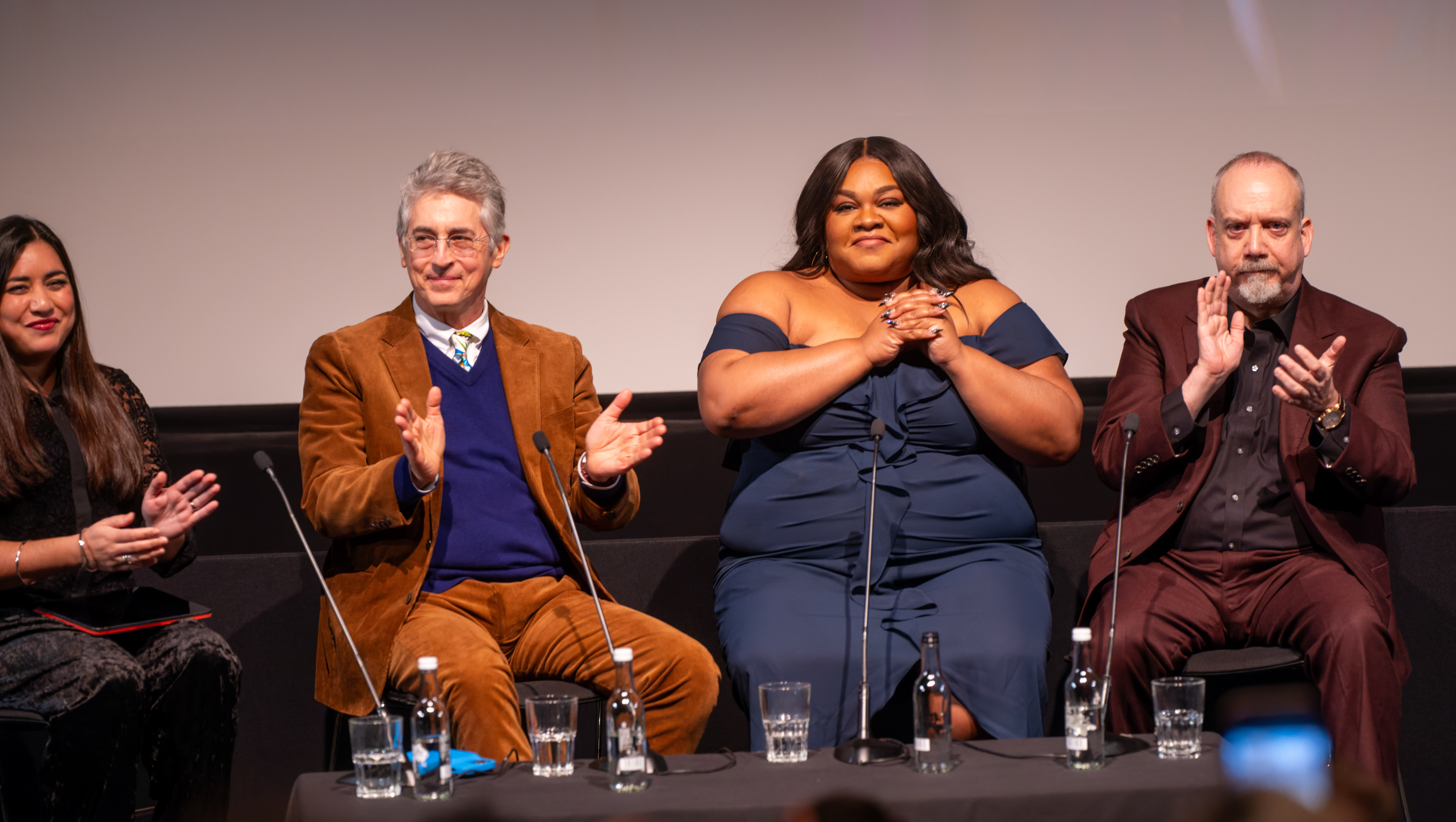
Payne with Da'Vine Joy Randolph and Paul Giamatti at a screening of The Holdovers (2024) in London

In June 2021, it was announced that Payne would direct Paul Giamatti in the David Hemingson-scripted film The Holdovers for Miramax. The film premiered at the Telluride Film Festival to widespread critical acclaim. Peter Debruge of Variety compared it to the films of Hal Ashby describing it as feeling as though it was a "lost 70s classic". Stephen Farber of The Hollywood Reporter hailed it as "an engaging and often touching comic drama that builds power as it moves toward its immensely satisfying conclusion."

In 2024, at the 30th Sarajevo Film Festival, Payne was awarded the Honorary Heart of Sarajevo award for his contribution to the art of filmmaking. The same year, Payne was said to be in production on—and targeting a 2025 release for—a documentary feature about film scholar Jeanine Basinger. However, no updates have been given since.

As of January 2026, Payne is directing a Danish-language film being shot in Denmark, fully funded by European sources. A co-production between the Norwegian Hummelfilm and Swedish Nordic Drama Queens, its backers include the Danish Film Institute, Norwegian Film Institute, Swedish Film Institute, Nordisk Film & TV Fond, and the Danish and Swedish national broadcasters, DR and SVT. The comedy-drama Somewhere Out There (Et Sted Derude) is his first film to be filmed in Europe, and stars Danish actors Jacob Lohmann, Jacob Haugaard, Ole Sørensen, and Lane Lind, joining Norwegian actress Renate Reinsve in a supporting role, announced earlier. The film is written by Norwegian writer Erlend Loe based on an idea by Åke Sandgren. Birgitte Skov is producing for Scanbox, which will also handle distribution in the Nordic countries. Searchlight Pictures has worldwide distribution rights, in Payne's third collaboration with the company.

=== Unrealized projects ===
In 1999, it was reported that Payne was in talks to direct Esquivel, a biopic starring John Leguizamo as Mexican musician Juan García Esquivel. He was also developing an adaptation of Paul Auster's The Locked Room at the time.

In 2000, it was reported that Payne was to co-write and direct an untitled film inspired by Oscar Wilde's The Picture of Dorian Gray. However, nothing more was heard of this project.

At one point, Payne was in talks to direct the remake of the 1966 heist comedy Gambit, after the Coen brothers did a rewrite of the film in 2003. He planned to reunite with Reese Witherspoon for the project, but he ultimately decided against it, reluctant to direct a script he didn't write.

In November 2010, it was reported that Payne would possibly direct the film adaptation of Daniel Clowes's graphic novel Wilson. Then in November 2011, Payne confirmed that he was to direct Wilson next after Nebraska (2013). However, Payne officially confirmed in a 2014 interview with Parade that he was no longer attached to the Wilson project.

It was reported in 2011 that Payne was to direct a film, Fork in the Road. That project was to have been an adaptation of a novel by Denis Hamill.

In 2012, it was reported that Payne and Jim Taylor wrote a script, The Lost Cause, which was said to be an expansion of Taylor's 2004 short film of the same name.

In November 2013, Payne was in talks to direct a film The Judge's Will for Fox Searchlight Pictures. The project was to have been based on a New Yorker article written by Ruth Prawer Jhabvala about an elderly judge from Delhi who wants to make sure his much younger wife will be taken care of after his death. In May 2018, it was reported that James Ivory would write the screenplay of the project for Payne. In June 2018, it was reported that Payne will possibly shoot The Judge's Will in Chicago.

In November 2014, it was announced that Payne would direct a film, La Vida Norteña. The project was to have been about a Latin music promoter who befriends a Nebraskan mayor.

In April 2015, it was reported that Payne was interested in directing Septillion to One, a contemporary romantic comedy inspired by the true story of Joan Ginther, who won the Texas State Lottery four times. Adam R. Perlman and Graham Sack's spec script was purchased by OddLot Entertainment, who intended to produce and finance the film. Payne was not officially committed to directing at the time, due to his preoccupation with the production of Downsizing (2017). In September 2016, Mark Romanek signed on to direct the film.

In February 2016, it was announced that Payne was to direct a film, My Saga, which is based on a pair of articles written by Karl Ove Knausgård and published by The New York Times Magazine. The articles cover Knausgård tracing the Vikings' voyages in North America. The film was to have been distributed by Netflix and star Mads Mikkelsen. In October 2019, the production was cancelled a week before filming was to begin due to Knausgard objecting to his life story being turned into a feature film.

In March 2018, Payne was in talks to direct The Burial, a legal drama film for Amazon Studios. The project was based on the true story of Mississippi-based lawyer Willie Gary, who takes on the case of Jeremiah O'Keefe, an owner of a chain of funeral homes who claimed he was swindled by a major funeral parlor conglomerate. Maggie Betts took over as director and the film premiered in 2023 at the Toronto International Film Festival.

It was reported in February 2019 that Payne was attached to direct the comedy horror film The Menu for Gary Sanchez Productions. The plot concerns a young couple that attends an exclusive restaurant in a tropical island only to experience some "shocking surprises." By April 2019, Emma Stone and Ralph Fiennes were set to star in the film. By May 2020, Mark Mylod replaced Payne on The Menu.

On December 2, 2019, it was announced that Payne was attached to direct an American remake of the 1987 Oscar-winning Danish film Babette's Feast. Payne's version is said to be set in Minnesota.

On December 20, 2019, it was announced that Payne was going to direct the HBO miniseries Landscapers. However, in October 2020, it was announced that Payne dropped out of the project due to a schedule conflict and was replaced by Will Sharpe.

In 2021, Payne said that one of his upcoming projects, which he planned to follow The Holdovers, would be a comedy set in Paris based on the true story of rival antique chair dealers, and that he was using the pandemic downtime to craft the screenplay. In 2023, Payne told IndieWire that he was working with Jim Taylor and a French screenwriting team, and that their script is "maybe 65 percent there". Project is based on the 2018 Vanity Fair article "The Chairmen".

In 2022, soon after the publication of Tracy Flick Can't Win, the sequel novel to Election, a film adaptation was announced to be in works at Paramount+ with Reese Witherspoon set to reprise her role as Tracy Flick and Payne returning to direct and co-write.

While promoting The Holdovers, Payne announced that he was collaborating with scribe David Hemingson yet again on a long-time dream to make a Western film. "I finally found a creative partner who shares the same zeal that I have for Westerns", Payne said. The film is said to be set in 1886 Custer County, Nebraska, and will feature Paul Giamatti in a currently undisclosed role. Payne has cited the Westerns of Anthony Mann as an influence on the project.

On a 2023 episode of Happy Sad Confused, Payne revealed that one of his favorite scripts which had not been produced was a rewrite with Jim Taylor on a film called Tucker Ames as Himself, which he described as "sort of a parody of a Bill Gates guy who gets his comeuppance in some way." In the same interview, Payne reiterated that he and Taylor were still discussing how to adapt Tracy Flick Can't Win, attributing his desire to add Matthew Broderick's character from the first film and veer away from "making high school movies," since the novel is set at a high school again.

== Style ==
Payne has set many of his films in Omaha, his hometown. His films sometimes include scenes of historical landmarks, black and white photographs, and museums, and he often uses amateur actors for minor roles.

Payne is on the short list of directors who have final cut rights for their films.

== Other activities ==
In 2005, he became a member of the Board of Governors of the Academy of Motion Picture Arts and Sciences (Directors Branch).

As of 2013 Payne was a director on the board of an Omaha non-profit film theater, Film Streams. He maintains a passion for preservation. In recent years, he helped preserve a historic film theater in Scottsbluff, Nebraska.

In 2012 Payne was co-owner (along with friend Ann Beeder) of King Fong, a Chinese restaurant in Omaha.

In 2012, he was named as a member of the Jury for the Main Competition at the 2012 Cannes Film Festival. His 2013 film Nebraska was nominated for the Palme d'Or at the 2013 Cannes Film Festival. With his Academy Award nomination for Nebraska in 2014, Payne has been nominated seven times, winning the Academy Award for Best Adapted Screenplay twice.

In 2025, Payne presided as the jury president for the main competition of the 82nd edition of Venice Film Festival.

== Personal life ==
Payne married Canadian actress Sandra Oh on January 1, 2003, after dating her for three years. On March 12, 2005, a publicist announced their separation. The divorce was officially finalized on December 22, 2006, although the former couple took more than two years to settle their finances. In 2015, Payne married Maria Kontos, whom he met while visiting the Aigio region of Greece where some of his ancestors originated. They welcomed a daughter in 2017, and divorced in 2022.

In 2022 he received Greek citizenship.

Payne is a long-time supporter of the Nebraska Coast Connection, a social networking organization that meets monthly in Culver City, California. In November 2013, he held a special screening of Nebraska for the group's members at the Sherry Lansing Theatre on the Paramount Studios lot.

=== Statutory rape allegation ===
In a 2018 interview with Ronan Farrow, actress Rose McGowan accused a "prominent” man in Hollywood of statutory rape but she did not name the person in question. In August 2020, McGowan said it was Payne and that he committed the act sometime in 1988 or 1989, when McGowan was 15 years old and Payne was about 28 years old.

Payne responded to McGowan's allegation by writing a guest column in Deadline Hollywood, in which he admitted to a consensual relationship with her, stating that they had met at some point in 1991 (McGowan turned 18 in September 1991) at an audition for a comic short film that he was directing for the Playboy Channel and had no reason to believe she was under the age of consent as the part required an actress who was of age. Payne ended his statement writing, "While I cannot allow false statements about events 29 years ago to go uncorrected, I will continue to wish only the best for Rose".

== Awards and nominations ==
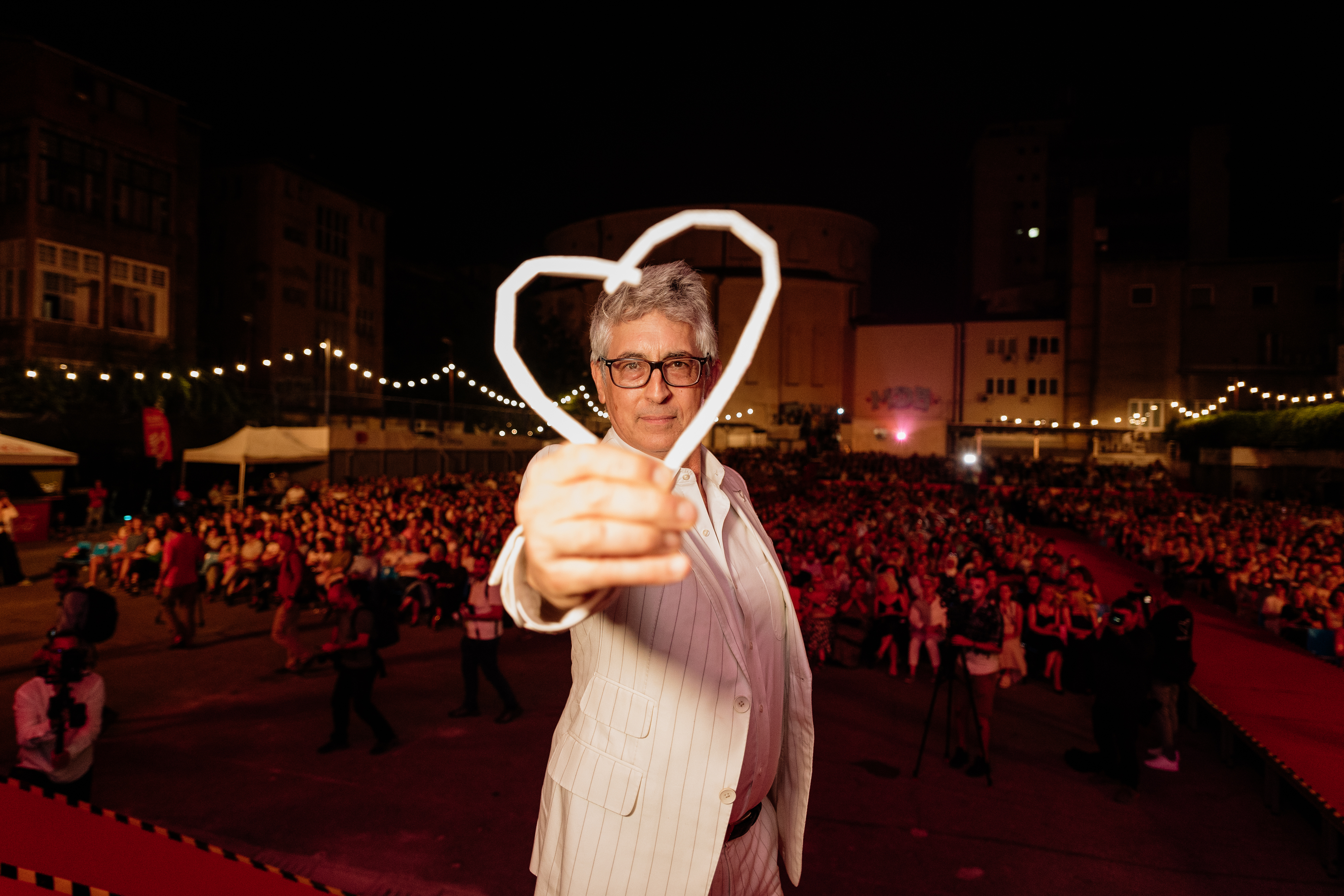
Payne holding the Honorary Heart of Sarajevo Award at the Sarajevo Film Festival in 2024.

Over his career, Payne has received numerous accolades including two Academy Awards, a BAFTA Award, two Golden Globe Awards, and five Independent Spirit Awards.

He has also received a nomination for a Grammy Award.

In 2017, Metacritic ranked Payne 2nd on its list of the 25 best film directors of the 21st century.

Year	Title	Academy Awards		BAFTA Awards		Golden Globe Awards	
Year	Title	Nominations	Wins	Nominations	Wins	Nominations	Wins
1999	Election	1				1	
2002	About Schmidt	2		1		5	2
2004	Sideways	5	1	1	1	7	2
2011	The Descendants	5	1	3		5	2
2013	Nebraska	6		3		5	
2017	Downsizing					1	
2023	The Holdovers	5	1	7	2	3	2
Total		19	3	15	3	27	8

Directed Academy Award performances
Under Payne's direction, these actors have received Academy Award nominations and wins for their performances in their respective roles.

Year	Performer	Title	Result
Academy Award for Best Actor
2003	Jack Nicholson	About Schmidt	Nominated
2012	George Clooney	The Descendants	Nominated
2014	Bruce Dern	Nebraska	Nominated
2024	Paul Giamatti	The Holdovers	Nominated
Academy Award for Best Supporting Actor
2005	Thomas Haden Church	Sideways	Nominated
Academy Award for Best Supporting Actress
2003	Kathy Bates	About Schmidt	Nominated
2005	Virginia Madsen	Sideways	Nominated
2014	June Squibb	Nebraska	Nominated
2024	Da'Vine Joy Randolph	The Holdovers	Won

In 2014, The Location Managers Guild of America honored Payne with their inaugural Eva Monley Award for his masterful use of location as another character.

== Filmography ==
Short film

Year	Title	Director	Writer	Producer	Notes
1985	Carmen	Yes	Yes	No	
1990	The Passion of Martin	Yes	Yes	Yes	
1991	Inside Out: My Secret Moments	Yes	Yes	No	
1992	Inside Out: The Houseguest	Yes	No	No	
2006	14e arrondissement	Yes	Yes	No	Segment of Paris, je t'aime

=== Feature film ===
Year	Title	Director	Writer	Producer	Notes
1996	Citizen Ruth	Yes	Yes	No	
1999	Election	Yes	Yes	No	
2002	About Schmidt	Yes	Yes	No	
2004	Sideways	Yes	Yes	No	
2011	The Descendants	Yes	Yes	Yes	
2013	Nebraska	Yes	No	No	
2017	Downsizing	Yes	Yes	Yes	
2023	The Holdovers	Yes	No	No	
TBA	Somewhere Out There	Yes	No	No	Danish-language debut; Filming

Documentary

Year	Title	Director	Writer	Producer	Notes
TBA	Untitled Jeanine Basinger documentary	Yes	TBA	TBA	In production

Executive producer

- The Assassination of Richard Nixon (2004)
- Gray Matters (2006)
- The Savages (2007)
- Sideways (2009)
- Kumiko, the Treasure Hunter (2014)
- Crash Pad (2017)
- Small Town Wisconsin (2020)

Producer

- King of California (2007)
- Cedar Rapids (2011)

Writer only

- Meet the Parents (2000) (uncredited)
- Jurassic Park III (2001)
- I Now Pronounce You Chuck and Larry (2007)

=== Television ===
Year	Title	Director	Executive producer	Episode
2009	Hung	Yes	Yes	"Pilot" (S1 E1)

== Bibliography ==
- Julie Levinson, ed. Alexander Payne: Interviews. Jackson: University Press of Mississippi, 2014. ISBN 978-1-62846-109-1.
- Alexander Payne and James Zemaitis. The Coffee Table Coffee Table Book. London: Black Dog Pub, 2003. ISBN 978-190-103304-5.
- Alexander Payne and Jim Taylor. The Sideways Guide to Wine and Life. New York: Newmarket, 2005. Illustrated by Rex Pickett. ISBN 978-155-704686-4.

== See also ==
- List of Golden Globe winners
