= List of awards and nominations received by Alexander Payne =

Alexander Payne awards and nominations
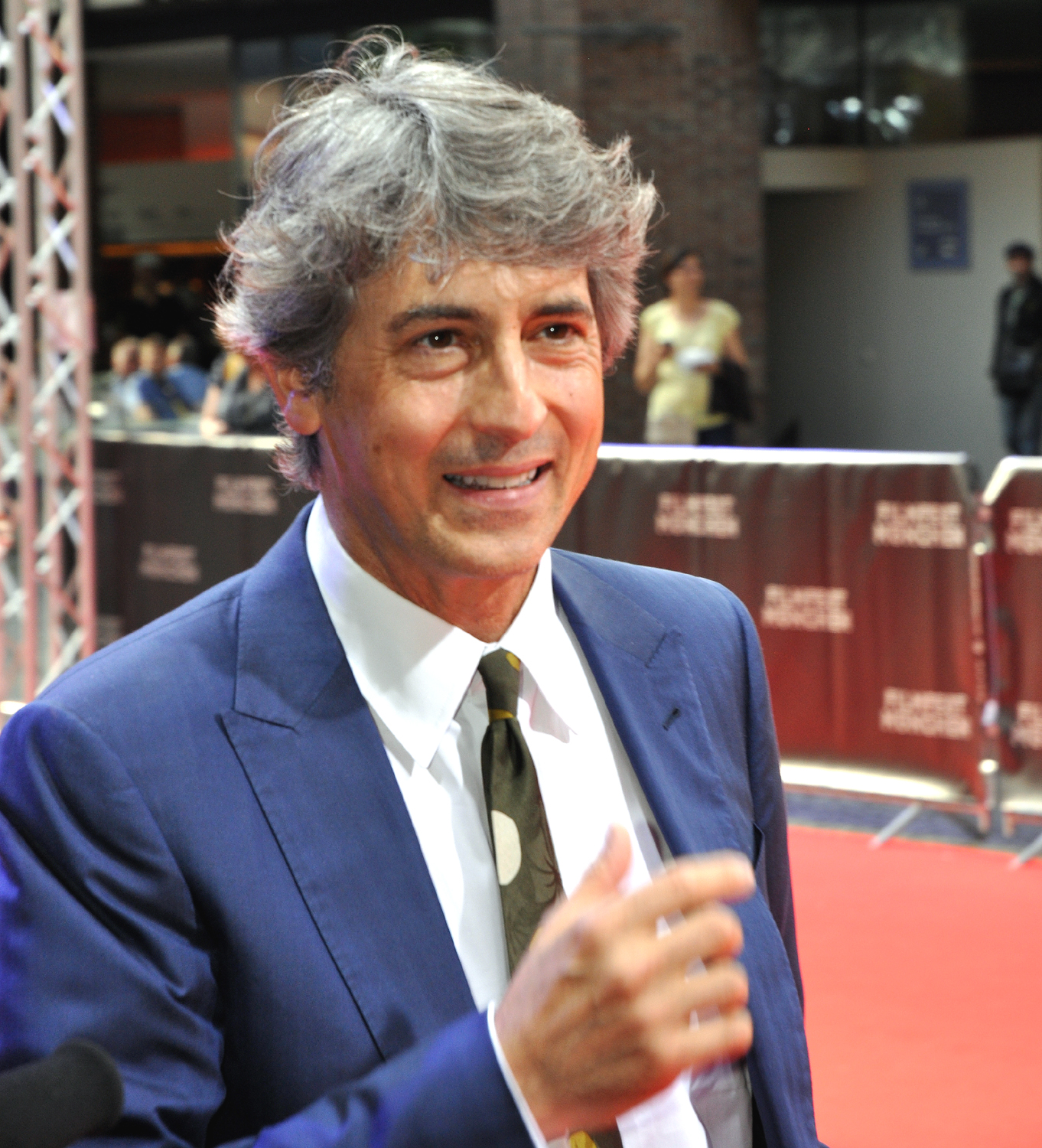
- Payne at the 2015 Munich Filmfestival
Awards and nominations
Award	Wins	Nominations
AACTA International Awards	0	1
AARP Movies for Grownups Awards	0	2
Academy Awards	2	7
Alliance of Women Film Journalists	1	3
American Comedy Awards	0	1
American Screenwriters Association	0	1
Astra Film Awards	0	1
Boston Society of Film Critics	1	3
British Academy Film Awards	1	4
Chicago Film Critics Association	1	5
Chlotrudis Society for Independent Films	1	3
Critics' Choice Movie Awards	1	6
Dallas–Fort Worth Film Critics Association	2	5
Directors Guild of America Awards	0	3
Florida Film Critics Circle	4	4
Georgia Film Critics Association	0	1
Golden Globe Awards	2	7
Golden Raspberry Awards	0	1
Gotham Awards	1	2
Grammy Awards	0	1
Houston Film Critics Society	1	4
Humanitas Prize	0	1
Independent Spirit Awards	5	8
London Film Critics' Circle	0	3
Los Angeles Film Critics Association	3	4
National Board of Review	2	2
National Society of Film Critics	1	4
New York Film Critics Circle	2	5
New York Film Critics Online	1	1
Online Film Critics Society	2	5
Palm Springs International Film Festival	1	1
Producers Guild of America Awards	0	1
San Diego Film Critics Society	2	3
San Francisco Film Critics Circle	2	2
Satellite Awards	1	5
St. Louis Film Critics Association	3	5
Thessaloniki International Film Festival	1	1
Toronto Film Critics Association	1	1
USC Scripter Awards	1	3
Valladolid International Film Festival	1	1
Vancouver Film Critics Circle	0	2
Washington D.C. Area Film Critics Association	2	3
Writers Guild of America Awards	3	4

Totals (Note: Certain award groups do not simply award one winner. They acknowledge several different recipients, have runners-up, and have third place. Since this is a specific recognition and is different from losing an award, runner-up mentions are considered wins in this award tally. For simplification and to avoid errors, each award in this list has been presumed to have had a prior nomination.)
- Wins: 51
- Nominations: 130
- Honours: 10

Alexander Payne is an American writer, director and producer known for the films About Schmidt (2002), Sideways (2004), The Descendants (2011), Nebraska (2013), and The Holdovers (2023). Over the course of his career, Payne has won two Academy Awards, two Golden Globes, a British Academy Film Award, five Independent Spirit Awards, three Writers Guild of America Awards and has been nominated for a Grammy Award and three Directors Guild of America Awards.

== Accolades ==
=== Awards and nominations ===
Award / Organization / Film festival	Year (Note: Indicates the year of ceremony.)	Category	Nominated work	Result	Ref(s)
AACTA International Awards	2012	Best Screenplay	The Descendants	Nominated	
AARP Movies for Grownups Awards	2012	Best Screenwriter	The Descendants	Nominated	
AARP Movies for Grownups Awards	2024	Best Director	The Holdovers	Nominated	
Academy Awards	2000	Best Adapted Screenplay	Election	Nominated	
Academy Awards	2005	Best Director	Sideways	Nominated	
Academy Awards	2005	Best Adapted Screenplay	Sideways	Won	
Academy Awards	2012	Best Picture	The Descendants	Nominated	
Academy Awards	2012	Best Director	The Descendants	Nominated	
Academy Awards	2012	Best Adapted Screenplay	The Descendants	Won	
Academy Awards	2014	Best Director	Nebraska	Nominated	
Alliance of Women Film Journalists	2012	Best Director	The Descendants	Nominated	
Alliance of Women Film Journalists	2012	Best Adapted Screenplay	The Descendants	Won	
Alliance of Women Film Journalists	2013	Best Director	Nebraska	Nominated	
American Comedy Awards	2014	Best Comedy Director – Film	Nebraska	Nominated	
American Screenwriters Association	2003	Discover Screenwriting Award	About Schmidt	Nominated	
Astra Film Awards	2024	Best Director	The Holdovers	Nominated	
Boston Society of Film Critics	1999	Best Screenplay	Election	Runner-up	
Boston Society of Film Critics	2004	Best Director	Sideways	Runner-up	
Boston Society of Film Critics	2004	Best Screenplay	Sideways	Won	
British Academy Film Awards	2005	Best Adapted Screenplay	Sideways	Won	
British Academy Film Awards	2012	Best Film	The Descendants	Nominated	
British Academy Film Awards	2012	Best Adapted Screenplay	The Descendants	Nominated	
British Academy Film Awards	2024	Best Direction	The Holdovers	Nominated	
Chicago Film Critics Association	2003	Best Director	About Schmidt	Nominated	
Chicago Film Critics Association	2003	Best Screenplay	About Schmidt	Nominated	
Chicago Film Critics Association	2005	Best Screenplay	Sideways	Won	
Chicago Film Critics Association	2011	Best Director	The Descendants	Nominated	
Chicago Film Critics Association	2011	Best Adapted Screenplay	The Descendants	Nominated	
Chlotrudis Society for Independent Films	2000	Best Screenplay	Election	Nominated	
Chlotrudis Society for Independent Films	2005	Best Adapted Screenplay	Sideways	Nominated	
Chlotrudis Society for Independent Films	2012	Best Adapted Screenplay	The Descendants	Won	
Critics' Choice Movie Awards	2003	Best Writer	About Schmidt	Nominated	
Critics' Choice Movie Awards	2005	Best Director	Sideways	Nominated	
Critics' Choice Movie Awards	2005	Best Writer	Sideways	Won	
Critics' Choice Movie Awards	2012	Best Director	The Descendants	Nominated	
Critics' Choice Movie Awards	2012	Best Adapted Screenplay	The Descendants	Nominated	
Critics' Choice Movie Awards	2024	Best Director	The Holdovers	Nominated	
Dallas–Fort Worth Film Critics Association	2005	Best Director	Sideways	3rd place	
Dallas–Fort Worth Film Critics Association	2011	Best Director	The Descendants	Won	
Dallas–Fort Worth Film Critics Association	2011	Best Screenplay	The Descendants	Won	
Dallas–Fort Worth Film Critics Association	2013	Best Director	Nebraska	3rd place	
Dallas–Fort Worth Film Critics Association	2023	Best Director	The Holdovers	3rd place	
Directors Guild of America Awards	2005	Outstanding Directorial Achievement in Motion Pictures	Sideways	Nominated	
Directors Guild of America Awards	2012	Outstanding Directorial Achievement in Motion Pictures	The Descendants	Nominated	
Directors Guild of America Awards	2024	Outstanding Directorial Achievement in Motion Pictures	The Holdovers	Nominated	
Florida Film Critics Circle	2000	Best Screenplay	Election	Won	
Florida Film Critics Circle	2004	Best Director	Sideways	Won	
Florida Film Critics Circle	2004	Best Screenplay	Sideways	Won	
Florida Film Critics Circle	2011	Best Adapted Screenplay	The Descendants	Won	
Georgia Film Critics Association	2012	Best Adapted Screenplay	The Descendants	Nominated	
Golden Globe Awards	2003	Best Director	About Schmidt	Nominated	
Golden Globe Awards	2003	Best Screenplay	About Schmidt	Won	
Golden Globe Awards	2005	Best Director	Sideways	Nominated	
Golden Globe Awards	2005	Best Screenplay	Sideways	Won	
Golden Globe Awards	2012	Best Director	The Descendants	Nominated	
Golden Globe Awards	2012	Best Screenplay	The Descendants	Nominated	
Golden Globe Awards	2014	Best Director	Nebraska	Nominated	
Golden Raspberry Awards	2008	Worst Screenplay	I Now Pronounce You Chuck & Larry	Nominated	
Gotham Awards	2004	Best Feature	Sideways	Won	
Gotham Awards	2011	Best Feature	The Descendants	Nominated	
Grammy Awards	2013	Best Compilation Soundtrack for Visual Media	The Descendants	Nominated	
Houston Film Critics Society	2012	Best Director	The Descendants	Nominated	
Houston Film Critics Society	2012	Best Screenplay	The Descendants	Won	
Houston Film Critics Society	2013	Best Director	Nebraska	Nominated	
Houston Film Critics Society	2024	Best Director	The Holdovers	Nominated	
Humanitas Prize	2012	Feature Film	The Descendants	Finalist	
Independent Spirit Awards	2000	Best Director	Election	Won	
Independent Spirit Awards	2000	Best Screenplay	Election	Won	
Independent Spirit Awards	2005	Best Director	Sideways	Won	
Independent Spirit Awards	2005	Best Screenplay	Sideways	Won	
Independent Spirit Awards	2012	Best Feature	The Descendants	Nominated	
Independent Spirit Awards	2012	Best Director	The Descendants	Nominated	
Independent Spirit Awards	2012	Best Screenplay	The Descendants	Won	
Independent Spirit Awards	2014	Best Director	Nebraska	Nominated	
London Film Critics' Circle	2005	Director of the Year	Sideways	Nominated	
London Film Critics' Circle	2005	Screenwriter of the Year	Sideways	Nominated	
London Film Critics' Circle	2012	Screenwriter of the Year	The Descendants	Nominated	
Los Angeles Film Critics Association	2003	Best Screenplay	About Schmidt	Won	
Los Angeles Film Critics Association	2005	Best Director	Sideways	Won	
Los Angeles Film Critics Association	2005	Best Screenplay	Sideways	Won	
Los Angeles Film Critics Association	2011	Best Screenplay	The Descendants	Runner-up	
National Board of Review	2005	Best Adapted Screenplay	Sideways	Won	
National Board of Review	2012	Best Adapted Screenplay	The Descendants	Won	
National Society of Film Critics	2000	Best Screenplay	Election	2nd place	
National Society of Film Critics	2003	Best Screenplay	About Schmidt	2nd place	
National Society of Film Critics	2005	Best Director	Sideways	2nd place	
National Society of Film Critics	2005	Best Screenplay	Sideways	Won	
New York Film Critics Circle	2000	Best Screenplay	Election	Won	
New York Film Critics Circle	2003	Best Director	About Schmidt	3rd place	
New York Film Critics Circle	2003	Best Screenplay	About Schmidt	2nd place	
New York Film Critics Circle	2005	Best Screenplay	Sideways	Won	
New York Film Critics Circle	2012	Best Screenplay	The Descendants	3rd place	
New York Film Critics Online	2011	Best Screenplay	The Descendants	Won	
Online Film Critics Society	2000	Best Adapted Screenplay	Election	Won	
Online Film Critics Society	2003	Best Adapted Screenplay	About Schmidt	Nominated	
Online Film Critics Society	2005	Best Director	Sideways	Nominated	
Online Film Critics Society	2005	Best Adapted Screenplay	Sideways	Won	
Online Film Critics Society	2012	Best Adapted Screenplay	The Descendants	Nominated	
Palm Springs International Film Festival	2005	Director of the Year	Sideways	Won	
Producers Guild of America Awards	2012	Outstanding Producer of Theatrical Motion Pictures	The Descendants	Nominated	
San Diego Film Critics Society	1999	Best Adapted Screenplay	Election	Won	
San Diego Film Critics Society	2004	Best Adapted Screenplay	Sideways	Won	
San Diego Film Critics Society	2011	Best Adapted Screenplay	The Descendants	Nominated	
San Francisco Film Critics Circle	2004	Best Director	Sideways	Won	
San Francisco Film Critics Circle	2004	Best Screenplay	Sideways	Won	
Satellite Awards	2005	Best Director	Sideways	Nominated	
Satellite Awards	2005	Best Adapted Screenplay	Sideways	Nominated	
Satellite Awards	2011	Best Director	The Descendants	Nominated	
Satellite Awards	2011	Best Adapted Screenplay	The Descendants	Won	
Satellite Awards	2024	Best Director	The Holdovers	Nominated	
St. Louis Film Critics Association	2005	Best Director – Comedy or Musical	Sideways	Won	
St. Louis Film Critics Association	2005	Best Screenplay	Sideways	Won	
St. Louis Film Critics Association	2011	Best Director	The Descendants	Nominated	
St. Louis Film Critics Association	2011	Best Adapted Screenplay	The Descendants	Won	
St. Louis Film Critics Association	2013	Best Director	Nebraska	Nominated	
Thessaloniki International Film Festival	1996	Best Screenplay	Citizen Ruth	Won	
Toronto Film Critics Association	2012	Best Screenplay	The Descendants	Runner-up	
USC Scripter Awards	2003	USC Scripter Award	About Schmidt	Nominated	
USC Scripter Awards	2005	USC Scripter Award	Sideways	Nominated	
USC Scripter Awards	2012	USC Scripter Award	The Descendants	Won	
Valladolid International Film Festival	1999	Best New Director	Election	Won	
Vancouver Film Critics Circle	2005	Best Director	Sideways	Nominated	
Vancouver Film Critics Circle	2012	Best Screenplay	The Descendants	Nominated	
Washington D.C. Area Film Critics Association	2004	Best Adapted Screenplay	Sideways	Won	
Washington D.C. Area Film Critics Association	2011	Best Director	The Descendants	Nominated	
Washington D.C. Area Film Critics Association	2011	Best Adapted Screenplay	The Descendants	Won	
Writers Guild of America Awards	2000	Best Adapted Screenplay	Election	Won	
Writers Guild of America Awards	2003	Best Adapted Screenplay	About Schmidt	Nominated	
Writers Guild of America Awards	2005	Best Adapted Screenplay	Sideways	Won	
Writers Guild of America Awards	2012	Best Adapted Screenplay	The Descendants	Won	

=== Special awards and other honors ===
Year	Award	Recognized work	Ref(s)
2000	Los Angeles Film Critics Association's New Generation Award	Citizen Ruth and Election	
2004	Filmmakers Alliance's Vision Award	—	
2011	Hawaii International Film Festival Vision in Film Award	—	
2012	ACE Golden Eddie Filmmaker of the Year Award	—	
2014	Location Managers Guild's Eva Monley Award	—	
2017	Los Angeles Greek Film Festival Orpheus Award Honoree	—	
2023	St. Louis International Film Festival Lifetime Achievement Award	—	
2024	Advanced Imaging Society's Harold Lloyd Award	—	
2024	Sarajevo Film Festival's Honorary Heart of Sarajevo Award	—	
2024	National Autonomous University of Mexico Film Archive Medal [es]	—	
2025	78th Locarno Film Festival Leopard of Honour (Pardo d’Onore Manor)	For his achievements during 33 years, he is honored with Pardo d’Onore.	
