= Lottery wheeling =

Method of systematically selecting multiple lottery tickets

Lottery wheeling (also known as a lottery system, lottery wheel, or lottery wheeling system) is a method of systematically selecting multiple lottery tickets to improve the odds of (or guarantee) a win. It is widely used by individual players and syndicates to secure wins provided they hit some of the drawn numbers. It requires playing with more than one ticket and more numbers than are drawn in the lottery.

In mathematics, a lottery wheel is an example of a covering.

== Explanation ==
Lottery wheeling systems allow players to play as many numbers as they wish in a well-organized and balanced way. The term "wheeling" comes from the cyclic way some systems are constructed. Players are usually interested in the minimum possible (or minimum known) number of tickets for a given guarantee. A lottery wheel has a basic guarantee, but it also has other secondary guarantees that can be observed in the system's "table of wins".

A single ticket is said to guarantee a P-win if P of the player's numbers are drawn. Similarly, a wheeling system guarantees a P-win if it contains every possible combination of P of the player's numbers that are drawn. The number of tickets needed in a system can be reduced by structuring the system such that a P-win is guaranteed in more than P drawn numbers. For example, a system with 12 numbers and a guarantee of "4 if 5" means the player will get a 4-win whenever five of his/her 12 numbers are among the drawn numbers.

A lottery wheel acts as a single ticket in terms of a particular guarantee, but it allows playing with a set of numbers of size larger than the size of the set of numbers drawn in the lottery. In a lottery where N numbers are drawn, a lottery wheel requires a subset of at least N+1 numbers. For instance, in a pick-6 lottery, a wheel has 7 or more numbers. In this lottery, a wheeling system with 10 numbers and a guarantee of 4 if 4 would require at least 20 tickets to be played.

Difficulty in constructing wheeling systems greatly increases with more numbers and combinations. In mathematics, the study of these objects falls within the branch of combinatorial design.

=== Example ===
Construction of a lottery wheel is illustrated with the following example. The lottery is a pick-6 with 9 numbers (1-9). The wheeling system has three groups of numbers: A = {1, 2, 3}, B = {4, 5, 6}, and C = {7, 8, 9}. Tickets are formed by cycling the groupings: AB (ticket 1), BC (ticket 3), and CA (ticket 2).

Ticket 1	1	2	3	4	5	6
Ticket 2	1	2	3	7	8	9
Ticket 3	4	5	6	7	8	9

Once 5 numbers are drawn, at least one ticket is guaranteed to contain 4 of the drawn numbers; that is to say, the wheel system is guaranteed a 4-win if 5 of the 9 numbers are drawn. Note that these tickets do not contain every combination of 4 numbers (such as 2, 3, 4, 7); the win is only guaranteed after the 5th drawn number.

Consider the possible distributions of the 5 drawn numbers among the three groups. There are always two groups that contain either all 5 or 4 of the 5 drawn numbers. Since any two groups are combined in a ticket, there will always be a 4-win (the basic guarantee), plus possibly a 5-win or 6-win.

=== Benefit ===
From a mathematical standpoint, 'wheeling' has no impact on the expected value of any given ticket. However, playing a lottery wheel impacts the win distribution over time—it gives a steadier stream of wins compared to a same-sized collection of tickets with numbers chosen at random. As an extreme example, consider a pick-6, 49 number lottery. In this case, there exists a wheeling system of 163 combinations that always guarantees a 3-win. In contrast, playing 163 tickets of random numbers guarantees nothing; in the worst case, all tickets yield zero.

Because of this steadier stream of wins, some lottery players find wheels an attractive strategy. Regular small wins while waiting for a jackpot seems to be a sought-after option for syndicates. Lottery systems are often mis-sold as a part of various lottery strategy related products, usually bundled with lottery prediction software, and various other "tools" which supposedly "improve the odds" or "guarantee profits" in get-rich-quick-schemes. These are often based on mathematically incorrect assumptions and claims, like the gambler's fallacy, or on plain misunderstanding or misrepresentation of probability theory.

The probability of hitting the jackpot varies between the different lotteries. Popular US lotteries have odds ranging from the astronomical 1 in ~300 million in Mega Millions (a double-pick lottery) to the fairly good 1 in ~170 thousand in the Wisconsin Lottery Badger 5 (a pick-5, 31 number lottery). Wheeling systems are usually intended to provide a minimum guaranteed number of wins if some of the drawn numbers are contained in the player's numbers.

== Variations ==
Lottery wheels were introduced in the 1970s and have become a popular method of playing. Several "spin off" methods have since become popular, with mixed acceptance.

Full wheels and abbreviated wheels are the most popular among different types of lottery wheels. Many lotteries provide the option of playing a full wheel either on a regular type of ticket or on a specially designed one without the need to fill all of the combinations individually. Several European lottery corporations have gone a step further and have provided the option of playing abbreviated wheels from a pre-approved selection, by using specially designed playing slips which refer to the chosen system by number and do not require filling the individual combinations of the system.

=== Full wheel ===
A full wheel (or full system) includes all combinations that can be generated from the player's set of numbers, and therefore guarantees a first-tier prize if all of the drawn numbers are within the player's set of numbers; it also guarantees a number of lower tier prizes. The drawback is cost—full wheels become fairly expensive as the size of the set of the player's chosen numbers increases. In a pick-6 lottery, a player who wishes to play a full wheel with 10 numbers will have to play 210 combinations; a full wheel with 15 numbers requires 5,005 combinations.

Some lotteries offer system forms. The player can mark 7 to 14 or 15 numbers in one grid.

In a famous occurrence, a Polish-Irish businessman named Stefan Klincewicz bought up 80% of the 1,947,792 combinations available at the Irish Lottery. He and his associates paid less than one million Irish pounds while the jackpot stood at 1.7 million pounds. The syndicate did have a ticket with the winning numbers. However, so did two other players, and the jackpot was split three ways. With the "Match 4" and "Match 5" prizes, though, Klincewicz's syndicate made a small profit overall.

=== Abbreviated wheel ===
An abbreviated wheel is an economical alternative to a full wheel. Although an abbreviated wheel does not include all possible combinations of the chosen numbers, it still guarantees at least one winning ticket if some of the numbers drawn are within the player's selection of numbers.

The following is an example of an abbreviated wheeling system for a pick-6 lottery with 10 numbers, 4 if 4 (and 5 if 7, 6 if 8), and the minimum possible number of combinations for that guarantee (20). A template for an abbreviated wheeling system is given as 20 combinations on the numbers from 1 to 10. Also given is a possible selection of player numbers and the resultant set of tickets (obtained by substituting the numbers 1-10 with the player’s numbers). Suppose four of the player's numbers—7, 12, 29, and 40—are drawn.

Numbers in template system:	1	2	3	4	5	6	7	8	9	10
Player’s numbers (example):	3	7	12	14	18	22	29	33	40	46

Abbreviated wheeling system example
	Combinations (template system)						Combinations (example player)					
Ticket 1	1	2	3	4	8	9	3	7	12	14	33	40
Ticket 2	1	2	3	5	6	7	3	7	12	18	22	29
Ticket 3	1	2	3	5	9	10	3	7	12	18	40	46
Ticket 4	1	2	4	5	8	10	3	7	14	18	33	46
Ticket 5	1	2	4	6	7	8	3	7	14	22	29	33
Ticket 6	1	2	6	7	9	10	3	7	22	29	40	46
Ticket 7	1	3	4	5	6	10	3	12	14	18	22	46
Ticket 8	1	3	4	5	7	8	3	12	14	18	29	33
Ticket 9	1	3	5	6	8	9	3	12	18	22	33	40
Ticket 10	1	3	7	8	9	10	3	12	29	33	40	46
Ticket 11	1	4	5	7	9	10	3	14	18	29	40	46
Ticket 12	1	4	6	8	9	10	3	14	22	33	40	46
Ticket 13	2	3	4	5	7	9	7	12	14	18	29	40
Ticket 14	2	3	4	6	9	10	7	12	14	22	40	46
Ticket 15	2	3	5	7	8	10	7	12	18	29	33	46
Ticket 16	2	3	6	7	8	9	7	12	22	29	33	40
Ticket 17	2	4	5	6	7	10	7	14	18	22	29	46
Ticket 18	2	5	6	8	9	10	7	18	22	33	40	46
Ticket 19	3	4	6	7	8	10	12	14	22	29	33	46
Ticket 20	4	5	6	7	8	9	14	18	22	29	33	40

Checking the table confirms the wheel's basic guarantee (a 4-win if four of the 10 player’s numbers are drawn). In fact, in this particular case, the system gives two 4-wins (tickets 13 and 16), as well as seven 3-wins (tickets 1, 2, 3, 6, 10, 14, 15). The number of combinations in an abbreviated wheel is significantly smaller than the number of combinations in a full wheel on the same set of numbers. In the example above, the abbreviated wheel with 10 numbers and a 4 if 4 guarantee has 20 tickets. A full wheel with 10 numbers requires 210 combinations and has a 6 if 6 guarantee.

=== Filtered wheel ===
Filters can further reduce the number of combinations in a full or abbreviated wheel, but they will generally destroy the wheel's guarantees. For example, a filter can remove combinations with all odd numbers, or balance the amount of odd and even numbers within the combination.

The goal of filtering a full set is to eliminate combinations that the player does not want to play. Furthermore, a filter can reduce a wheel's size while retaining one or more guarantees. Instead of using a wheel template, a player can use a computer program that filters and reduces the obtained set of combinations respecting a set of conditions.

Example 1: Pick 6, 8 numbers picked, with filters: 2 or 4 even numbers and 2 or 4 low numbers.

Ticket 1	1	8	13	16	25	37
Ticket 2	1	8	13	16	28	32
Ticket 3	1	13	25	28	32	37
Ticket 4	8	16	25	28	32	37

Example 2 (template): Pick 6, 10 numbers wheel, 3 if 3, with filters: one or more from 1 to 5, and one or more from 6 to 10, and three or more from 1 to 10.

Ticket 1	1	2	3	6	7	10
Ticket 2	1	2	4	7	8	9
Ticket 3	1	2	5	6	9	10
Ticket 4	1	3	4	6	8	9
Ticket 5	1	4	5	7	8	10
Ticket 6	2	3	4	6	8	10
Ticket 7	2	3	5	7	9	10
Ticket 8	2	4	5	8	9	10
Ticket 9	3	4	5	6	7	8

=== Key number wheel ===
A key number wheel (or power number wheel) is a wheel in which one or more numbers (called key numbers or power numbers) appear in every combination of the wheel.

Example: Pick 5, 7 numbers wheel, with 2 key numbers (1 and 2), 2 if 2 and 3 if 4 for the full set and 4 if 5 for the filtered set:

Ticket 1	1	2	3	4	6
Ticket 2	1	2	3	5	7
Ticket 3	1	2	4	5	6
Ticket 4	1	2	4	6	7

=== Positional wheel ===
A positional wheel allows the player to generally distribute numbers in different positions. The abbreviated positional wheels are mostly very small.

Example: 12 numbers, in 4 places or positions, with 2 if 2 and 3 if 4:

ID	N1	N2	N3	N4
Ticket 1	1	4	7	10
Ticket 2	1	5	8	11
Ticket 3	1	6	9	12
Ticket 4	2	4	9	11
Ticket 5	2	5	7	12
Ticket 6	2	6	8	10
Ticket 7	3	4	8	12
Ticket 8	3	5	9	10
Ticket 9	3	6	7	11

=== Keno wheel ===
Pick 2 or 2 spot game, 2 if 3 of 6 guaranteed. For Ohio the payout of 2/2 2 spot is $11. The payout for a 3/6 6 spot is $1. The wheel would pay at least $5 net for a 3/6 while one 6 spot would pay $0 net for a 3/6.

ID	N1	N2
Ticket 1	1	2
Ticket 2	1	3
Ticket 3	2	3
Ticket 4	4	5
Ticket 5	4	6
Ticket 6	5	6

=== All or nothing wheel ===
All or nothing Texas is a 12 of 24 drawing game. Both ends pay equally. Playing 1 to 12 also covers 13 to 24 as 0/12 also pays a jackpot. Therefore playing 1 combination already is like playing a wheel.

A wheel covering all combinations to guarantee a prize [?].

ID	N1	N2	N3	N4	N5	N6	N7	N8	N9	N10	N11	N12
Ticket 1	1	2	3	4	5	6	7	8	9	10	11	12
Ticket 2	1	2	3	4	5	6	7	13	14	15	16	17
Ticket 3	1	2	3	4	5	6	7	18	19	20	21	22
Ticket 4	1	2	3	4	5	8	9	13	14	18	19	23
Ticket 5	1	2	3	4	5	8	9	15	16	20	21	24
Ticket 6	1	2	3	4	5	10	11	13	14	20	22	24
Ticket 7	1	2	3	4	5	10	11	15	17	18	21	23
Ticket 8	1	2	3	4	5	12	16	17	19	22	23	24
Ticket 9	1	2	3	4	6	8	10	13	16	21	22	23
Ticket 10	1	2	3	4	6	8	11	14	17	19	21	24
Ticket 11	1	2	3	4	6	9	12	13	15	18	22	24
Ticket 12	1	2	3	4	6	10	12	14	15	19	20	23
Ticket 13	1	2	3	4	7	9	12	13	17	20	21	23
Ticket 14	1	2	3	4	7	10	12	14	16	18	21	24
Ticket 15	1	2	3	5	6	11	12	13	16	18	20	23
Ticket 16	1	2	3	5	7	8	12	14	15	21	22	23
Ticket 17	1	2	3	6	7	8	10	13	17	18	20	24
Ticket 18	1	2	3	6	7	9	11	14	16	19	22	23
Ticket 19	1	2	3	7	8	11	12	13	15	16	19	24
Ticket 20	1	2	3	8	9	10	12	14	16	17	20	22
Ticket 21	1	2	4	6	7	8	11	15	20	22	23	24
Ticket 22	1	2	4	7	8	10	11	16	17	18	19	22
Ticket 23	1	2	5	6	7	9	10	13	14	19	21	24
Ticket 24	1	2	7	9	10	15	16	17	19	20	23	24
Ticket 25	1	2	9	10	11	12	13	15	17	19	21	22

== See also ==
- Lottery payouts
