= Nebraska Coast Connection =

The Nebraska Coast Connection is a social networking group founded in 1992 which allows professionals working in the entertainment industry to share their experiences growing up in Nebraska. Members provide advice and insights into succeeding in the entertainment industry centered in Los Angeles, CA. The organization hosts recreational activities and regular monthly gatherings called the Hollywood Salon, and meets at the Culver Hotel in Culver City, California

Group supporter Alexander Payne, held a special screening of his Oscar nominated film, Nebraska, for the group's members in the Sherry Lansing Theater on the Paramount Studios lot in November 2013. Todd Nelson, the group's founder, also accompanied Payne to Cannes for the film's premiere. Leo Adam Biga, author of Alexander Payne: His Journey in Film, wrote extensively about the group.
