= All or Nothing (lottery) =

Lottery

All or Nothing is the name and format of a lottery game where the player chooses half of the numbers in play. Prizes are awarded based on how many of the numbers chosen match the numbers in the official draw. Because the player chooses half of the number matrix, the odds of selecting all numbers drawn and of selecting none of the numbers drawn are identical. Subsequently, identical top prizes are awarded for matching all numbers or nothing, hence the name. Smaller prizes are likewise symmetrical, with the second-prize tier being awarded for matching all but one number, or only one number, and so on. The concept originated in 2012 with the Texas Lottery, and has since been adopted by other states.

== Lotteries with "All or Nothing" games ==
Multiple lotteries in the United States offer versions of the game:

State	Start date	Draw matrix	Draw frequency	Price per play	Top prize	References
Arizona Discontinued	May 18, 2014	20	Twice daily	$2	$25,000	
Georgia Discontinued	March 2, 2014	24	4 times daily	$2	$250,000	
Iowa and Minnesota (Note: Joint game operated by the Multi-State Lottery Association) Discontinued	January 27, 2015	24	Twice daily	$1	$100,000	
Massachusetts Discontinued	July 18, 2016	24	4-minutes video lottery	$1	$100,000	
North Carolina Discontinued	September 7, 2014	24	Twice daily	$2	$250,000	
Texas	September 10, 2012	24	4 times daily	$2	$250,000	
Wisconsin	April 7, 2019	22	Twice daily	$2	$100,000	

The Illinois Lottery once offered Hit or Miss, a game played similarly, with the addition of "The Good Life" number that also was printed for each play. Matching all or none of the 12 out of 24 regular numbers drawn won $250,000 cash; also matching "The Good Life" number, from 1 to 6, won an additional $100,000 per year for 20 years. Drawings were held four times a day, and ran from September 22, 2013, to February 28, 2015.

Outside the US, this format was used by the National Lottery of Ireland between 2009 and 2012 and is used for the Russian state lottery game "All or Nothing", which has a guaranteed jackpot of 2,000,000 rubles and is drawn every 15 minutes per hour.
