= Joan R. Ginther =

American lottery winner

Joan R. Ginther was an American lottery winner. On four occasions between 1993 and 2010, she collected winnings in excess of US$2 million in state lotteries, to a grand total of US$20.4 million.

== Early life ==
Born in Bishop, Texas, Ginther had an undergraduate degree in mathematics from the University of Texas at Austin and a PhD in mathematics and education from Stanford University.

== Description ==
Joan Ginther was an American four-time lottery winner. She first won the lottery in 1993, when she won $5.4 million in Lotto Texas (equivalent to about $12M in 2025). Her next win came in 2006 when she won $2 million in the Holiday Millionaire scratch-off. Her third win happened in 2008, when she won $3 million from a Millions and Millions ticket. In 2010, she won $10 million, her largest prize, bringing her total winnings to $20.4 million. According to mathematicians asked by the Associated Press, the odds of winning this many times were one in 18 times 10 to the power 24, but this was apparently a miscalculation. All of her winning tickets were purchased in Texas, and two of them were bought from the same convenience store in Bishop, Texas. Prior to her death, she lived in Las Vegas, Nevada, and preferred to keep a low profile.

Ginther died on April 12, 2024.

== See also ==
- Lotteries in the United States
