= Texas Lottery =

Official lottery system of the U.S. state of Texas

- Region: Texas, United States
- First draw: May 29, 1992; 34 years ago
- Operator: International Game Technology
- Regulated by: Texas Lottery Commission (until 2025); Texas Department of Licensing and Regulation (since 2025)
- Number of games: 8 draw games
- Shown on: Webcast
- Website: texaslottery.com

The Texas Lottery is the government-operated lottery available throughout Texas. The lottery operates draw games and scratch-off games, with a portion of profit directed towards funds for public education and veteran's programs.

From its inception through 2025, the lottery was operated by the Texas Lottery Commission. The lottery and its operator, International Game Technology (formerly GTECH Corporation), have been criticized and investigated by Texas lawmakers and media. In 2025, the Lottery Commission was disbanded, and control of the lottery was passed to the Texas Department of Licensing and Regulation.

== History ==
Governor Ann Richards "instituted the Texas lottery to supplement school finances", according to the record of the U.S. Congress. House Bill 54 was introduced for a state lottery on July 11, 1991. The voters of Texas approved an amendment to the Texas Constitution November 5, 1991 authorizing lottery sales in Texas.

The Texas Lottery Commission created an unusual contest for the Lottery logo; designs from a contracted advertising agency were pitted against designs from the general public. One logo from each source was placed in head-to-head competition, and the winning logo, a cowboy hat thrown high in celebration (still in current use) was the public design. The winner was Suzan Holten, from Carrollton.

The lottery's first game was the scratch game Lone Star Millions, with the first ticket sold to Texas Lottery's primary promoter, then Gov. Richards, at Polk's Feed Store in Oak Hill, on May 29, 1992. First-day sales of 23.2 million tickets sets a then-world record. First-week sales ending June 5 set another world record, with over 102 million tickets.

Lotto Texas began sales on November 7, 1992, with the first drawing on November 14 and the first jackpot won by a resident of Schulenburg on November 28.

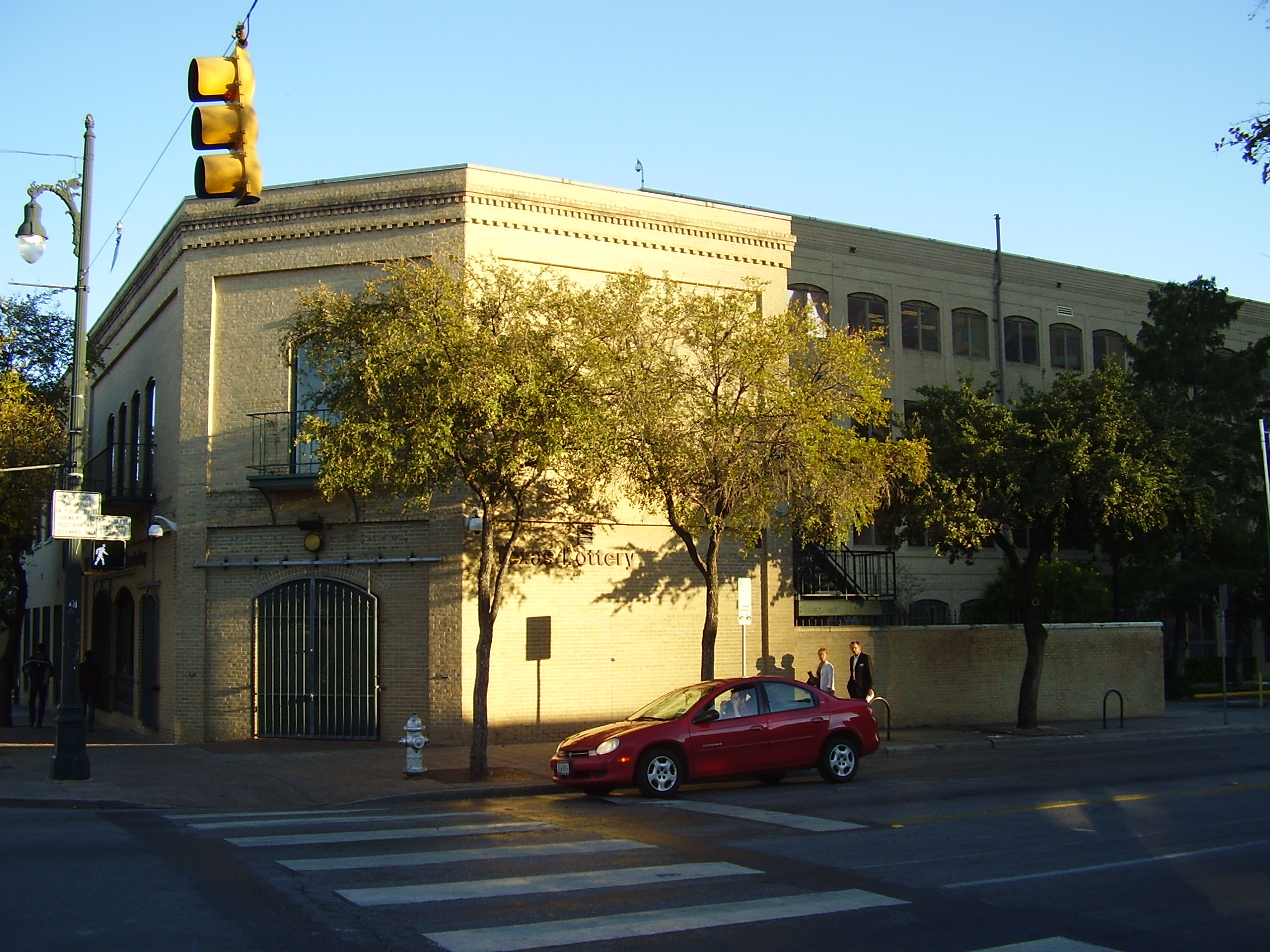
Lottery headquarters in downtown Austin

The Texas Lottery Commission was formed via legislation in 1993 to take over management of the lottery from the Texas Comptroller of Public Accounts; the legislation also gives the commission oversight of charitable bingo games (moving that duty from the Texas Alcoholic Beverage Commission).

By November 1993, Texas Lottery sales exceeded US$1 billion, breaking a record set by the Florida Lottery in 1989. By 1998, Texas news media were prominently featuring negative reports on the state’s lottery contractor, IGT.

Controversies ended the appointments of Texas Lottery's first three executive directors, among others who followed, including Lawrence Littwin, in 1997; Linda Cloud, in 2002; Reagan Greer, in 2005; and, more recently, Gary Greif, in 2024, and his successor, Ryan Mindell, the following year. Littwin's successor, Linda Cloud, resigned in 2002, admitting to lying to media regarding "her knowledge of accusations that a former lottery commissioner had harassed and bruised a female lottery employee during a lunch meeting" which she claimed was due to the instruction of Governor Rick Perry's chief of staff, Mike McKinney.

Joan R. Ginther became a four-time winner of prizes over $1 million from 1993 to 2010, first from Lotto Texas and subsequently three times from scratch tickets. All of her winning tickets were purchased in Texas, and two of them were bought from the same convenience store in Bishop.

Texas joined the Mega Millions consortium in 2003, with sales beginning December 3 and the first drawing to include Texas on December 5. Though no Texas ticket won the jackpot, one Texas-bought ticket matched the first five numbers for US$175,000. The first Texas jackpot winner of Mega Millions was not until the drawing of October 4, 2004; a Carrollton player took home the $101 million (annuity value) prize.

As part of the cross-selling arrangement between the operators of Mega Millions and Powerball, the Texas Lottery Commission agreed to begin selling Powerball tickets on January 31, 2010; the first drawing including Texas was three days later.

On April 23, 2013, the House voted not to recommission the Texas Lottery Commission, which would have potentially brought an end to the lottery in Texas. Later in the day, the House reversed course with a new vote on the bill.

In 2023, a consortium led by London-based trader Bernard Marantelli, co-founder of Colossus Bets, obtained official IGT ticket-printing terminals, which they used to produce nearly all of the 25.8 million possible number combinations in Texas lottery tickets, to obtain a $95 million jackpot. The scheme was carried out "in plain view of the authorities" resulting in what Texas Lieutenant Governor Dan Patrick declared to be "the biggest theft from the people of Texas in the history of Texas".

Gary Grief, executive director, resigned in 2024 after facing public scrutiny for his role in facilitating mass lottery ticket purchases using third-party courier firms such as Jackpocket. This raised questions about regulatory monitoring and fairness in lottery operations. The following year, on April 21, 2025, his successor, Ryan Mindell, a 10-year veteran of the commission, resigned from the same post at the embattled Texas Lottery Commission, one year after his 2025 promotion to executive director.

=== Scandals ===
International Game Technology (IGT), formerly known as GTECH Corporation, has operated Texas Lottery games since its inception in 1994. In 2012, the company's contract was estimated at $100 million annually, making GTECH the fourth-largest vendor to the state of Texas. The lottery operator has been implicated in scandals regarding its management of the state lottery.

A class-action lawsuit was filed on February 14, 2025 against IGT, Lottery.com, Rook TK, and former Texas Lottery commissioner Gary Grief. The suit alleges that the defendants manipulated the lottery system to ensure a fraudulent win in the April 22, 2023 Lotto Texas drawing, which allowed a foreign criminal organization to claim a $57.7 million lottery prize. On February 24, governor Greg Abbott directed the Texas Rangers to investigate the $83.5 million jackpot win.

On February 27, it was reported that IGT had directly and indirectly influenced state policymakers, including acting as a title sponsor for Governor Abbott’s 2025 State of the State address.

=== Courier services ===
Online lottery ticket resellers, known as ticket couriers, have operated legally in Texas since 2019. These services purchase physical tickets through third-party resellers, photograph them, and then notify winners. According to a November 2024 Texas House interim report, courier services accounted for $101 million in lottery ticket sales over the first seven months of the 2023 financial year in Texas. Legal experts and state officials have questioned whether such businesses adhere to Texas laws that restrict the sale of lottery tickets over the internet.

On February 28, 2025, the Texas Senate voted to ban courier services from participating in the purchase of lottery tickets. The Texas Lottery Commission's use and management of courier services has resulted in on-going investigations, in 2025, by both the Texas Rangers and the Texas attorney general.

== Socioeconomic impact and criticism ==
Academic research have expressed worry about the Texas Lottery's regressive nature. Donald I. Price and E. Shawn Novak conducted a 1999 study, published in the National Tax Journal, that examined spending trends on Lotto, Pick 3, and Instant games and discovered that all three were regressive kinds of taxes that disproportionately affected low-income, less-educated, and minority groups. Instant scratch-off games were shown to be the most regressive, with higher spending rates in largely Black and Hispanic zip codes. These findings have spurred debate over the ethics of state-run lotteries and their social implications.

Texas Lottery has been criticized due to both transferring only 25% of its annual net revenue to the Texas Education Agency, as well as for funding only half the school days in 2024 as it did in 1995, despite the lottery's consistently rising revenues.

=== Revenue allocation ===
In the 2018 fiscal year, lottery revenue was allocated as:

- 65 percent is paid out in prizes.
- 25 percent is paid to the Foundation School Fund, which is administered by the Texas Education Agency to support public education in Texas.
- 5 percent is paid to retailers as commissions.
- 3 percent is retained to cover administration costs.
- 2 percent is transferred to the Texas Legislature for allocation. Since 2009 this money has gone to the Texas Fund for Veterans Assistance and other state programs. This revenue includes that from unclaimed prizes and from sales of scratch ticket games such as Veterans Cash.

Prior to the 2018 fiscal year, the Texas Lottery Commission paid retailers a bonus for selling top-prize tickets for in-house draw games and for scratch tickets winning $1 million or higher. This program has been discontinued as of September 1, 2018.

As of 2023, the Texas Lottery had provided more than $35 billion to public education and $220 million to veterans' support programs. In FY 2022 alone, $1.9 billion was transferred to the Foundation School Fund.

== General rules ==
As with most US lotteries, players must be at least 18 years of age.

Winning tickets must be claimed within 180 days or the prize is forfeited. For scratch tickets, the time limit begins when a game is closed by the Commission; for drawings the time limit begins the date of the drawing.

Within Texas, players must choose the cash value option (CVO) or annual pay (AP) when purchasing Powerball, Mega Millions, and/or Lotto Texas tickets when playing, instead of after winning (see below).

== Current games ==
=== Scratch tickets ===
The Texas Lottery began operations on May 29, 1992 with sales of Lone Star Millions. By the game's end on February 1, 2004, it set a world record for first-day sales (23.2 million tickets) and first-week sales (102.4 million tickets), There were 6 prizes of $1 million (annuity-only) and 479 of $10,000 each.

Scratch tickets, most changing frequently, cost $1 to $100 each. The Texas Lottery is the first and only U.S. lottery to offer $100 scratch-off tickets as of May 2022.

Prizes have included not only cash (from $1 to $20,000,000), and free tickets (which can be used to purchase any Texas drawing game), but also trucks, tickets to sports events, and tours of Cowboys Stadium.

=== In-house drawings ===
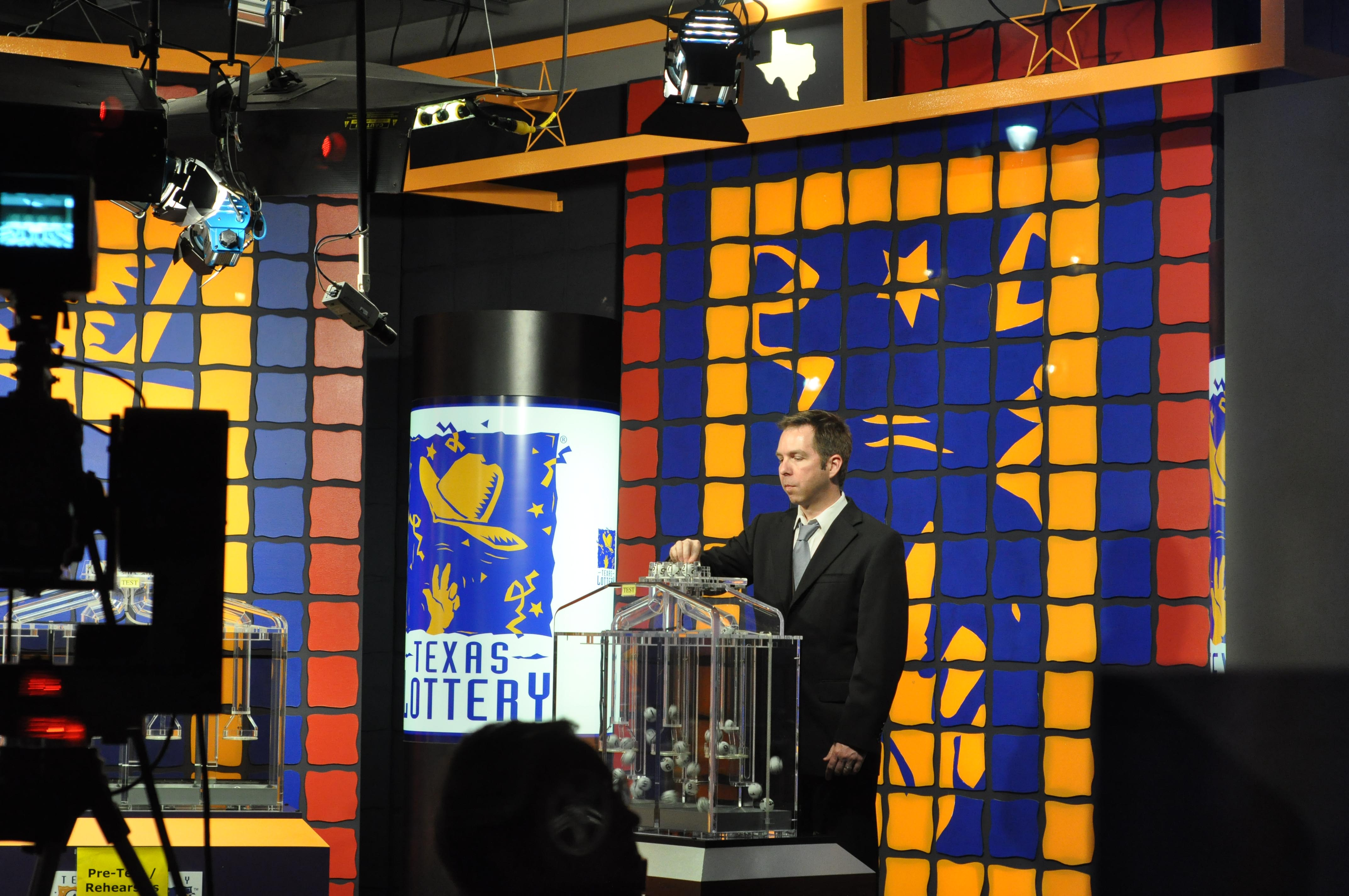
A drawing being conducted at the lottery's television studio

==== Lotto Texas ====
Lotto Texas was the first Texas in-house drawing game offered, with sales beginning on November 7, 1992; its first drawing on November 14, 1992, and the first jackpot won on November 28, 1992. By its first anniversary, the Texas Lottery sold over $1 billion in tickets.

Initially sold as an annuity-only game (no cash option), the purchaser having to pick numbers, and the drawings held only on Saturdays, Lotto Texas later added the "Quick Pick" option (random selection of numbers, added on May 29, 1993, the Lottery's first anniversary), the "Cash Value" option (CVO), and changed the drawings to twice weekly, adding Wednesdays.

Among notable winners was Thomas "Hollywood" Henderson, the former Dallas Cowboys linebacker, who claimed a winning jackpot in excess of $14 million in 2000.

The current format utilizes 54 balls drawn from a machine; players choose 6 numbers. The jackpot is paid either in 30 annual payments, or in lump sum (discussed further below). Non-jackpot payments are in lump sum. Each game costs $1, the minimum jackpot is $5 million, and drawings are held at 10:12 PM Central time on Wednesdays and Saturdays. Lotto Texas expanded with a Monday drawing, started in August 23, 2021.

Lotto Texas made the Extra! option available to players on April 14, 2013, with the first drawing to include Extra! winnings being held on April 17, 2013. The Extra! option costs $1 more per play. This gives players the chance to win $2 for matching 2 of 6 numbers. The Extra! option also adds $10 to the base prize amount for matching 3 of 6 numbers, $100 to the base prize for matching 4 of 6 numbers, and $10,000 to the base prize for matching 5 of 6 numbers. No change is made to the jackpot prize amount.

Matches	Prize	Current probability of winning
3 of 6 numbers	$3 (guaranteed)	1:75
4 of 6 numbers	$50 (estimated)	1:1,526
5 of 6 numbers	$2,000 (estimated)	1:89,678
All 6 numbers	Jackpot	1:25,827,165

Overall odds of winning are 1:71. Overall odds of winning are 1:7.9 with the Extra! option.

==== Texas Two Step ====
Texas Two Step is the other twice-weekly in-house game in Texas. Sales for Texas Two Step began on May 13, 2001.

The current format utilizes a 4+1 matrix using two sets of numbers 1 through 35. Players choose five numbers; four from the first set of 35 white balls, and the fifth, Bonus Ball, from a set of 35 red balls. All payments, including the jackpot, are in lump sum. Each game is $1, the minimum jackpot is $200,000, and drawings are held at 10:12 PM on Mondays and Thursdays.

Matches	Prize	Current probability of winning
Zero numbers, plus Bonus Ball	$5 (guaranteed)	1:58
1 number, plus Bonus Ball	$7 (guaranteed)	1:102
2 numbers, plus Bonus Ball	$20 (estimated)	1:657
3 numbers, no Bonus Ball	$20 (estimated)	1:435
3 numbers, plus Bonus Ball	$50 (estimated)	1:14,779
4 numbers, no Bonus Ball	$1,500 (estimated)	1:53,900
All 4 numbers, plus Bonus Ball	Jackpot	1:1,832,600

Overall odds of winning are 1:32.4.

Texas Two-Step's jackpot always is paid in lump sum; as such, it is the only Texas Lottery jackpot game not to require players to choose cash or annuity when playing (see below.)

==== All or Nothing ====
Introduced in 2012, All or Nothing is drawn 24 times weekly, at 10:00 am, 12:27 pm, 6:00 pm, and 10:12 pm Central Time Mondays through Saturdays. Players choose (or let the lottery terminal select) 12 numbers from a field of 24. A player wins $250,000 cash if either all 12 numbers match those drawn or if none match the numbers drawn (the top prize has a $5 million liability limit on all drawings on this game). The odds of either way of winning the top prize are the same; the first ball drawn determines whether a player must match all the numbers, or none, to win the top prize. Other prizes are $500, $50, $10, and $2; players win either by matching at least eight numbers or no more than four. Each play is $2.

Each number set on an All or Nothing playslip has boxes for quick pick and for multi-draw, where a player may select to use the same numbers for up to 24 consecutive drawings.

The All or Nothing concept and format has subsequently been adopted by other state lotteries.

==== Cash Five ====
Cash Five is a daily-draw game. Sales for this game (which replaced a similarly named game, Cash 5, which debuted in August 1995) began on July 29, 2002. On Sept. 23, 2018, Cash Five relaunched with a new matrix, better overall odds of winning and guaranteed prizes, including a $25,000 top prize. The first drawing with the new rules in place was on Sept. 24, 2018.

The current format utilizes one set of 35 balls; players choose five numbers. All payments are in lump sum. Each game costs $1; and drawings are held at 10:12 PM Central time Mondays through Saturdays.

Matches	Prize Category	Prize	Current probability of winning
2 of 5 numbers	Fourth Prize	Free Cash Five Quick Pick Ticket ($1 value)	1:8
3 of 5 numbers	Third Prize	$15	1:75
4 of 5 numbers	Second Prize	$350	1:2,164
All 5 numbers	First (Top) Prize	$25,000	1:324,632

Overall odds of winning are 1:7.2

==== Pick 3 ====
Pick 3 is a four times daily draw game. It began on October 25, 1993.

The current format utilizes three sets of digits 0 through 9. Players choose: exact order (all three digits), any order (two or three digits), exact and any order (two or three digits) and combo (two or three digits; combo two is the same as two exact order plays while combo three is the same as three or six exact order plays).

All payments are in lump sum. Exact or any order bets cost $0.50 or $1; exact and any order for $1, combo (two digits cost $1.50 or $3; three digits cost $3 or $6). The prizes are guaranteed amounts, and drawings are held four times a day, at 10:00 AM, 12:27 PM, 6:00 PM, and 10:12 PM Central time Mondays through Saturdays.

==== Daily 4 ====
Daily 4 also is drawn 24 times weekly. Sales began on September 30, 2007.

Daily 4 is played as in Pick 3, except there are 4 digits. Players can select: Straight (all four digits in exact order), Box (all four digits in any order), Straight/Box (all four digits), Pairs [two of the four digits in exact order, which can be: front pair (first two digits), middle pair (middle digits), or back pair (last two digits)], Combo [which can be: 4-way (three of the four digits drawn are identical, such as 1112), 6-way (the digits drawn are two pairs, such as 1122), 12-way (two of the four digits drawn are identical, such as 1123) and or 24-way (all four digits are different, such as 1234)].

All payments are in lump sum. Players can select Straight or Box for either $0.50 or $1; Straight/Box for $1; Pairs for $0.50 or $1; Combo (4-way for $2 or $4; 6-way for $3 or $6; 12-way for $6 or $12; or 24-way for $12 or $24). The prizes are guaranteed amounts, and drawings are held at 10:00 AM, 12:27 PM, 6:00 PM, and 10:12 PM Central time Mondays through Saturdays.

===== Fireball =====
On April 28, 2019, the Lottery replaced the Sum It-Up with the new Fireball option. The Fireball is an add-on to the Pick 3, and Daily 4 games. Activating the Fireball feature doubles the cost of the play.

After the Pick 3 and Daily 4 numbers are drawn, one digit 0 through 9 is drawn and designated as the Fireball number (The Fireball number is separate from Pick 3 and Daily 4). The Fireball number may then be used by the player to replace any one digit in the Pick 3 and Daily 4 numbers. For instance, if the player selects 123 in the Pick 3 game, and the number actually drawn is 124, but the Fireball is a 3, the player may replace the 4 with a 3 to create a winning combination.

Because the Fireball creates additional ways to win, a win using the Fireball generally pays a lesser amount than a win using the base play, however, a player can win both from the Fireball and from the base play if the Fireball matches one of the digits naturally.

=== Multi-jurisdictional drawings ===
==== Mega Millions ====
In 2003, the Texas Lottery joined the Mega Millions consortium.

The current format utilizes one set of 70 white balls, and a second set, of 25 yellow balls (the "Mega Ball".) Players choose six numbers; five white ball numbers, and the "Mega Ball" from the second set. Jackpots are paid in either 30 graduated annual payments, or in cash; see below on jackpot choices. Non-jackpot payments are in lump sum. Each game costs $2, the minimum jackpot is $40 million, and drawings are held at 10:00 PM Central time on Tuesdays and Fridays.

Texas, as in all Mega Millions jurisdictions except for California, offers an option, called Megaplier (similar to Powerball's Power Play) which multiplies non-jackpot prizes by either 2, 3, 4, or 5. Second prize (5+0), normally $1 million, can be quintupled, to $5 million cash, if Megaplier was chosen. Texas is among the jurisdictions that offer a feature called “just the jackpot”. For $3, a player selects 2 sets of numbers which qualify for the jackpot only. “Just the jackpot” wagers are not eligible for other payouts that are offered in the game though the player is required to make the jackpot choice if either set matches all 6 numbers to win the jackpot.

==== Powerball ====
On October 13, 2009, the Mega Millions consortium and MUSL (the operator of Powerball, the other major US lottery game) reached an agreement in principle for lotteries, at their option, to cross-sell Mega Millions and Powerball; the earliest date agreed on was January 31, 2010.

The Texas Lottery Commission elected to participate in the agreement; on November 17, 2009 voted to publish Powerball rules for public comment. On December 14, 2009 the Commission held a public hearing, receiving comments on the proposal to join Powerball.

On January 6, 2010, the Commission voted 3-0 to join Powerball. Texas sales for the game began on January 31, 2010; the first drawing including Texas was conducted three days later.

The current format utilizes one set of 69 white balls, and a second set, of 26 red balls (the "Powerball".) Players choose six numbers; five white ball numbers, and the "Powerball” from the second set. Jackpots are paid in either 30 graduated annual payments, or in cash; see below on jackpot choices. Non-jackpot payments are in lump sum. Each game costs $2, the minimum jackpot is $40 million, and drawings are held at 10:12 P.M Central time following the in state drawings that take place on Mondays, Wednesdays and Saturdays.

=== Former draw games ===
==== Texas Triple Chance ====
Texas Triple Chance was a $2 game featuring a $100,000 top prize, with play beginning on September 28, 2015. Players would select 7 numbers from 1 to 55 (or quick pick). In addition to that set, a player received two extra sets, both quick picks. Ten numbers were drawn. Players had to match 3 or more numbers in each chance to win a prize and they won by matching their numbers on one, two or three chances to the ten numbers drawn (although they can’t combine numbers from different chances to win prizes). Texas Triple Chance drawings were held Monday through Saturday at 10:12 p.m. Central Time. On July 15, 2018, the Texas Lottery announced that the game would end with the final drawing on July 28, 2018.

==== Monopoly Millionaires' Club ====
Monopoly Millionaires' Club (MMC) began sales on October 19, 2014; it was drawn Fridays. Plays were $5 each. Players chose 5 of 52 numbers; a sixth number, from a field of 28 (automatically quick-picked), also represented one of the properties on a U.S. Monopoly game board.

Texas suspended sales of MMC following the December 12, 2014 drawing and the remaining 22 participants voted to suspend Monopoly Millionaires' Club after the December 26 draw.

MMC was tied to a television game show, which continued airing until April 2016.

==== Texas Million ====
Texas Million began on May 18, 1998, offering a top prize of $1 million. It was discontinued on May 11, 2001, with 25 top-prize winners during its run.

== Jackpot choice regulations ==
Texas Lottery regulations require the players to choose either cash value option (CVO) or the annuity value (AP) on the lottery playslips at the ticket sales for Texas Lotto, Powerball, and MegaMillions. If the choice isn't marked on the playslip, it is rejected until the correction is made. Texas Lottery does not allow the players to change their choices after the ticket sales.

The games such as Texas Two Step, Pick 3, Daily 4, Cash Five, and All or Nothing are paid in lump sum only.

== See also ==
- Gambling in Texas
- Lotteries in the United States
