= Citizen Ruth =

1996 American film directed by Alexander Payne

- Original film poster
- Directed by: Alexander Payne
- Written by: Alexander Payne; Jim Taylor
- Produced by: Cary Woods; Cathy Konrad; Andrew Stone; Michael Zimbrich
- Starring: Laura Dern; Swoosie Kurtz; Kelly Preston; Burt Reynolds; Kurtwood Smith; Mary Kay Place; M. C. Gainey; Kenneth Mars; Tippi Hedren
- Cinematography: James Glennon
- Edited by: Kevin Tent
- Music by: Rolfe Kent
- Distributed by: Miramax Films
- Release dates: January 24, 1996 (Sundance); December 13, 1996 (United States)
- Running time: 102 minutes
- Country: United States
- Language: English
- Budget: $2 million
- Box office: $285,112

Citizen Ruth is a 1996 American satirical black comedy film directed by Alexander Payne, in his feature film directorial debut, and starring Laura Dern, Swoosie Kurtz, Kelly Preston, Burt Reynolds, Kurtwood Smith, Mary Kay Place, Kenneth Mars, and Tippi Hedren. This film marked Kenneth Mars’ final theatrical film role.

The film follows a poor, drug-addled, irresponsible pregnant woman who unexpectedly attracts national attention from those involved in the abortion debate. The story was inspired by the case of Martina Greywind, a homeless, unmarried mother from North Dakota who was offered $15,000 to carry what would have been her fifth child to term.

The film premiered at the Sundance Film Festival in January 1996. It later opened in limited release in the United States on December 13, 1996.

== Plot ==
Ruth Stoops is an inebriated addict in Nebraska who is capable of doing nearly anything to get money or drugs. She has four children, all of whom have been taken from her custody by the state because of her inability to care for them. One morning, Ruth and her boyfriend have intercourse on a bed in a flophouse, after which he disrespectfully throws her out of the apartment. Afterward, she visits the home of her brother and sister-in-law to sneak a look at two of her children and beg her brother for money. Despite being family, she waits at the back door similar to a dog. She later goes to a hardware store to buy wood sealant and huffs it in a paper bag in an alley to get high.

After Ruth is arrested for her continuing drug use, she discovers that she is pregnant again. At her arraignment, she learns to her horror that she is facing felony charges for endangering a fetus; her many earlier arrests had all been on misdemeanors. The judge, who knows of the situation with Ruth's other children, informs her after the hearing that he will lessen her sentence if she has an abortion. Ruth is bailed out of jail by Norm and Gail Stoney, a middle-aged radical Evangelical couple who have become aware of Ruth's story through the local news. The couple takes her into their home and attempts to persuade her to keep her child. On the first night, Ruth, impervious to their convictions, sneaks out of the house with the couple's reckless teenage daughter, Cheryl, and again huffs paint and smokes marijuana.

At the Stoneys' urging, Ruth visits a crisis pregnancy center where she is further persuaded to go forward with her pregnancy, despite her resistance given her limited opportunities and drug problem. After she is found huffing glue at an anti-abortion protest with Gail and Norm, they kick her out of the house. Diane, a friend of Gail's who participates in abortion protests, offers to take Ruth in. Upon arriving at Diane's farmhouse, Diane discloses that she is in fact a lesbian abortion-rights activist and spy who attempts to help women she feels the Stoneys and others prey upon. The witless Ruth soon finds comfort in Diane and her partner, Rachel, as well as Harlan, a gruff disabled veteran and friend of the women who provides security detail for them.

After the Stoneys discover Diane was working against them, they stake out Diane's home with numerous other anti-abortion activists and engage in religious song and mass prayer. They offer Ruth $15,000 to keep her child, which Harlan ultimately agrees to match if Ruth goes through with her abortion. The scene becomes a spectacle documented by news stations and is exacerbated when Blaine Gibbons, a charismatic and famous evangelist, arrives to participate. Blaine offers Ruth an additional $15,000 from his ministry to cancel the abortion. After Ruth finds alcohol in the house and gets drunk, Diane chews her out and tells her to sleep it off.

On the morning Ruth is to have her abortion, she suffers a miscarriage and becomes disillusioned with Diane, whom she realizes is using her as a pawn to promote her message, similar to the Stoneys. Ruth conceals the miscarriage from Diane and Rachel, and agrees to travel to the abortion clinic with them; the three are escorted via helicopter with renowned abortion-rights activist Jessica Weiss, who saw Ruth's story in the media and felt compelled to help her. Upon arriving at the clinic, Ruth manages to locate the $15,000 Harlan had promised her, which he has stashed behind the front desk, and escapes out of a back window. Though the clinic is surrounded by anti-abortion and abortion-rights picketers alike, they fail to notice Ruth as she walks through the crowd before running down the street with her backpack of money.

== Cast ==
- Laura Dern as Ruth Stoops
- Swoosie Kurtz as Diane Siegler
- Kurtwood Smith as Norm Stoney
- Mary Kay Place as Gail Stoney
- Kelly Preston as Rachel
- M. C. Gainey as Harlan
- Kenneth Mars as Dr. Charles Rollins
- David Graf as Judge Richter
- Kathleen Noone as Nurse Pat
- Tippi Hedren as Jessica Weiss
- Burt Reynolds as Blaine Gibbons
- Alicia Witt as Cheryl Stoney
- Diane Ladd as Ruth’s mother (uncredited)

== Themes ==
Citizen Ruth is known for its explicit attack on the abortion debate. Through black comedy and satire, the film spins the motif of women seeking abortions in "ways unprecedented in prior decades" of film. Most importantly, the film uses these methods of humor "to critique moral realism in the abortion debates." While the film's overt subject matter is abortion, director Alexander Payne has insisted that the film is more prominently about the human side of fanaticism. Elaborating on this, Payne said, "People become fanatics for highly personal reasons. I mean, it's more about them and their own psychosis than about that cause." This point has been noted by critics, who reaffirm the common loss in sight made by extremists of the people and issues involved in such debates.

A running joke in the movie is a "Success in Finance"-type tape produced by an Amway-type company. Ruth takes the tape and studies it to determine what to do with her newfound money. It is never shown what she does with the money as the film abruptly ends.

== Release ==
The film premiered at the 1996 Sundance Film Festival. Its initial title was The Devil Inside, but Miramax insisted on changing it because they felt it sounded too much like a horror film title. It was then changed to Meet Ruth Stoops, then finally Citizen Ruth.

Though the film had a positive reception at Sundance, it was not theatrically released until the end of the year on December 13, 1996, reportedly because of controversy surrounding the film Priest and condemnation from Catholic organizations in the United States. Alexander Payne and Jim Taylor expressed that Miramax did not make good on a promise to support the film and to campaign Dern for an Academy Award nomination, instead focusing their promotional efforts on Sling Blade for that Oscars season.

=== Home media ===
The film was released on VHS by Miramax Home Entertainment in 1997. On June 25, 1997, Miramax also released it on LaserDisc in the United States, with the film later receiving a DVD release on April 8, 2003.

In 2010, Miramax was sold by Disney (their owners since 1993), with the studio being taken over by private equity firm Filmyard Holdings that same year. Filmyard sublicensed the home video rights for several Miramax titles to Lionsgate, who re-released Citizen Ruth on DVD in 2014. Miramax was then taken over by Qatari company beIN Media Group during March 2016. In April 2020, ViacomCBS (now known as Paramount Skydance) acquired the rights to Miramax's library, after buying a 49% stake in the studio from beIN. Citizen Ruth was one of the titles Paramount acquired in the 2020 deal, and it was later made available on their streaming service Paramount+.

== Reception ==
Citizen Ruth received positive reviews upon release. On review aggregator Rotten Tomatoes, the film has an approval rating of 81% based on 26 reviews, with an average score of 6.8/10. The site's critical consensus reads, "Smart and sharply funny, Citizen Ruth is an entertaining look at a tough subject – and an impressive calling card for debuting director/co-writer Alexander Payne." On Metacritic, the film has a weighted average score of 63 out of 100, based on 18 critics, indicating "generally favorable" reviews.

Praise was given to Dern's performance, with Janet Maslin of The New York Times, writing "Criminally negligent as Ruth is, she becomes outrageously funny and weirdly lovable thanks to Laura Dern's sidesplitting performance in this role. Proving herself a terrific physical comedian, the long and rangy Ms. Dern kicks and shrieks her way through the crisis that erupts over Ruth's plight."

Roger Ebert of the Chicago Sun-Times gave the film three stars out of four praising the film for its "reckless courage to take on both sides in the abortion debate" and for its "gallery of sharp-edged satiric portraits." He added, "There is a point at which this all perhaps grows a little thin; we yearn for someone to cheer for, instead of against. But there is courage in the decision to make Ruth an unredeemed dopehead whose only instinct is to go for the cash. I doubt that the two sides in the debate would actually engage in a bidding war, but that's what satire is for: To take reality and extend it to absurdity."

Owen Gleiberman of Entertainment Weekly also gave the film a positive review calling the performances "pinpoint perfect", though also suggesting that the "movie is a little too aware of its own outrageousness." Todd McCarthy of Variety focused on the fact of Citizen Ruth being Payne's directorial debut, stating, "Director Payne may not yet possess all the skills necessary to completely pull off a full-scale social farce; he could profitably have added more comic invention around the edges, but he does score quite a few points, even-handedly ribbing the extremists in both camps."

== Bibliography ==
- Biskind, Peter (2004). Down and Dirty Pictures: Miramax, Sundance, and the Rise of Independent Film. Simon & Schuster. ISBN 978-0684862590.
