= Golden Globe Award for Best Actor in a Motion Picture – Drama =

Film award for lead actor

Golden Globe for Best Actor in a Motion Picture – Drama
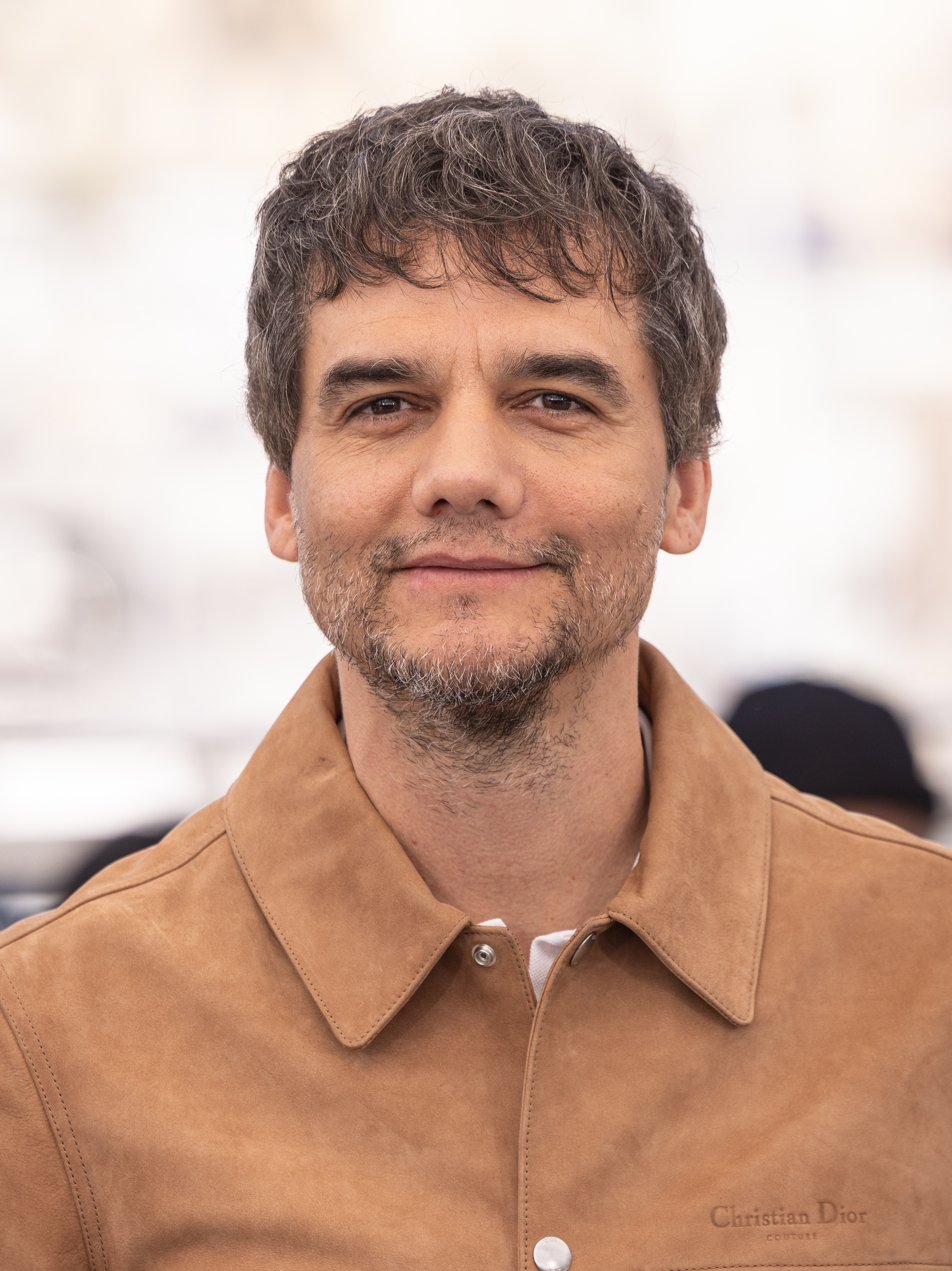
- The 2025 recipient: Wagner Moura
- Awarded for: Best Performance by a Leading Actor in a Drama
- Location: United States
- Presented by: Dick Clark Productions
- Currently held by: Wagner Moura for The Secret Agent (2025)
- Website: goldenglobes.com

The Golden Globe Award for Best Actor in a Motion Picture – Drama is a Golden Globe Award that was first awarded by the Hollywood Foreign Press Association as a separate category in 1951. Previously, there was a single award for "Best Actor in a Motion Picture" but the splitting allowed for recognition of it and the Best Actor – Musical or Comedy.

The formal title has varied since its inception. In 2005, it was officially called: "Best Performance by an Actor in a Motion Picture – Drama". As of 2013, the wording is "Best Actor in a Motion Picture – Drama".

== Winners and nominees ==
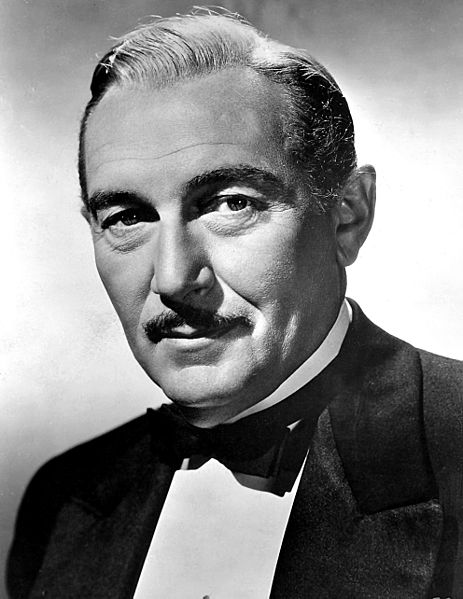
Paul Lukas was the first recipient of this award for Watch on the Rhine (1943)

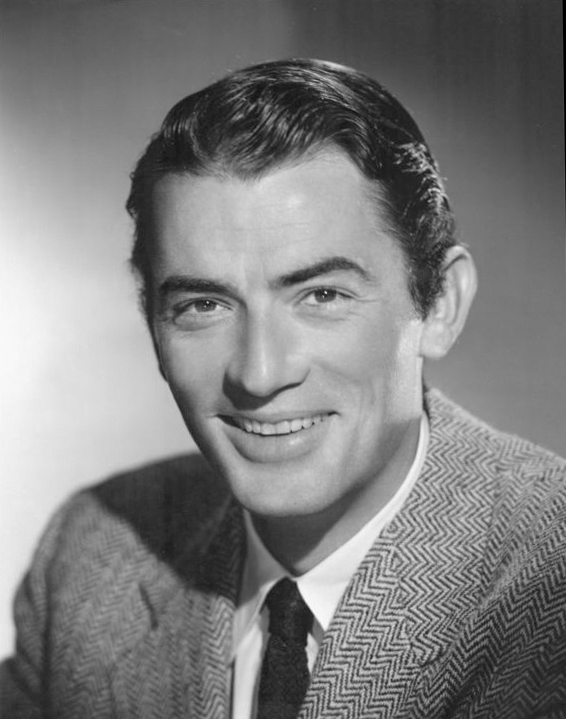
Gregory Peck won twice for The Yearling (1946) and To Kill a Mockingbird (1962)

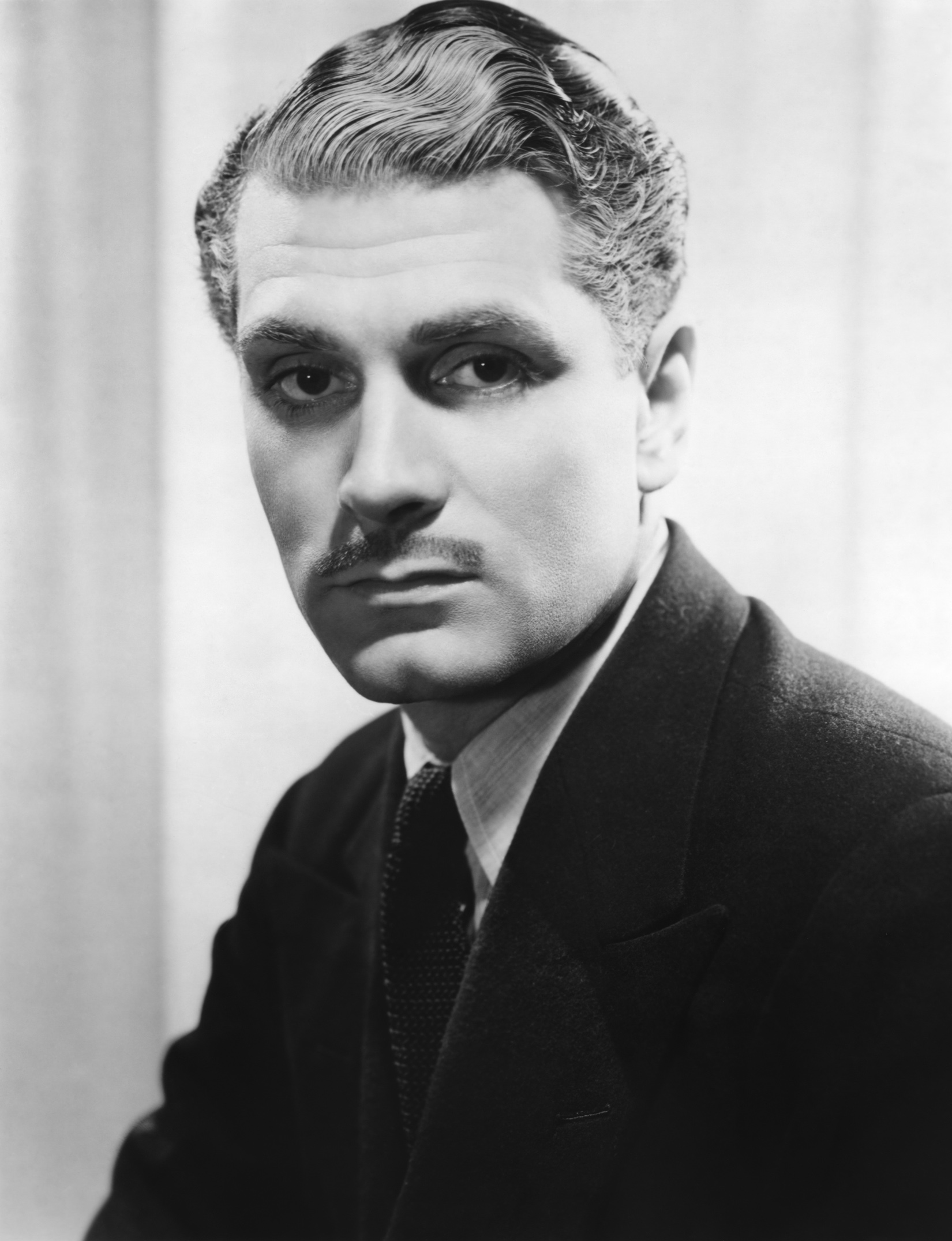
Laurence Olivier won for Hamlet (1948)

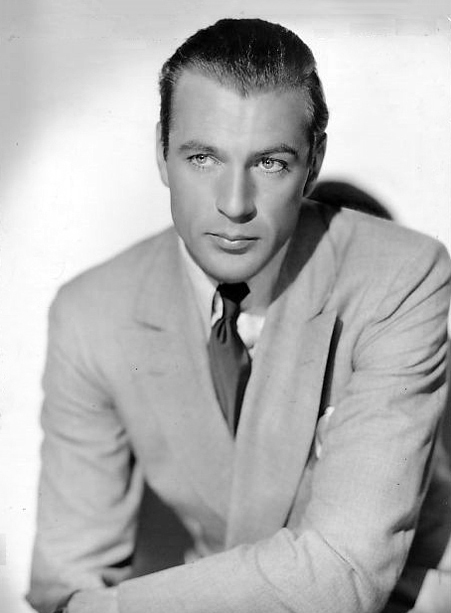
Gary Cooper won for High Noon (1952)

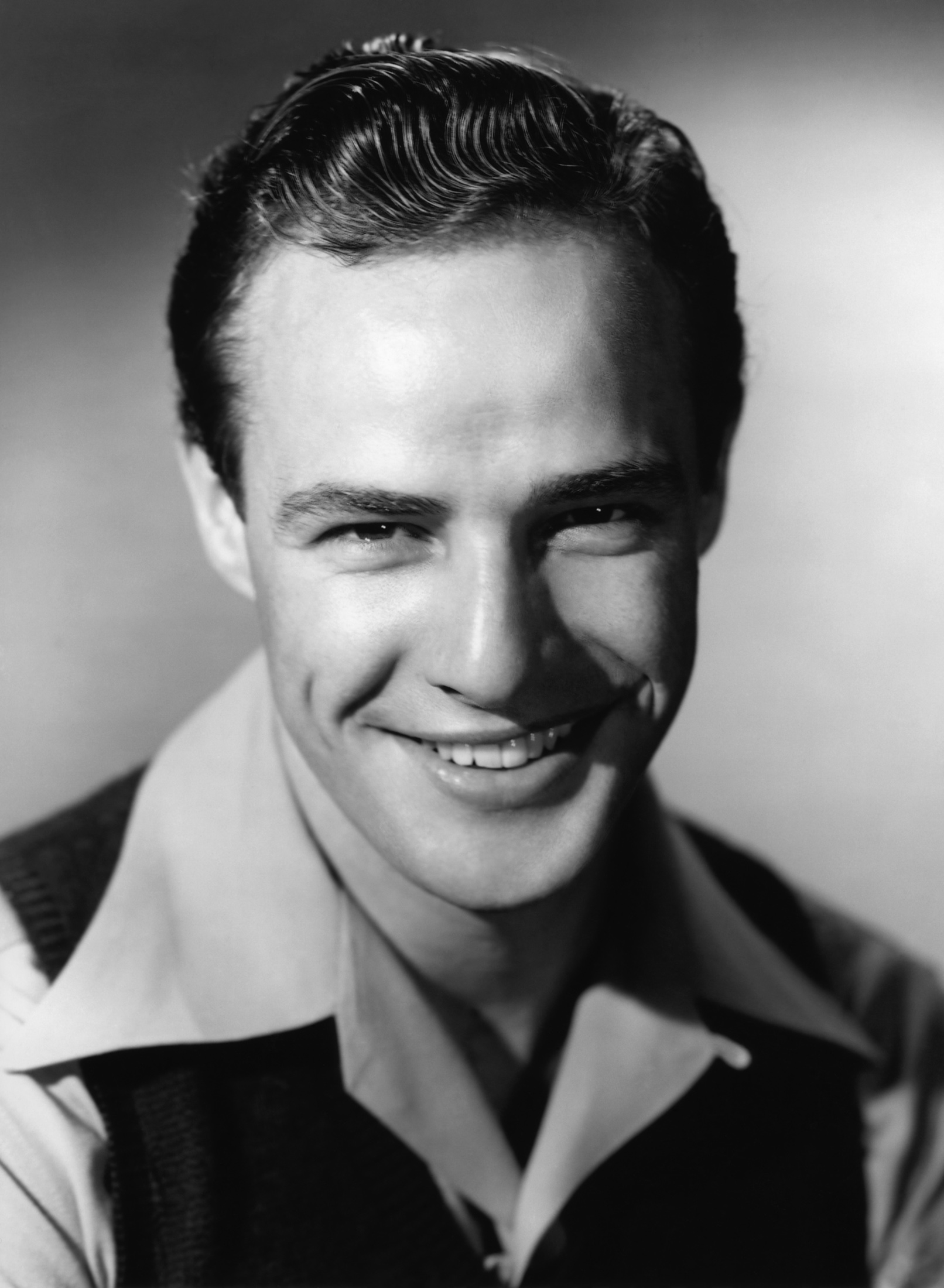
Marlon Brando won for On the Waterfront (1954) and The Godfather (1972)

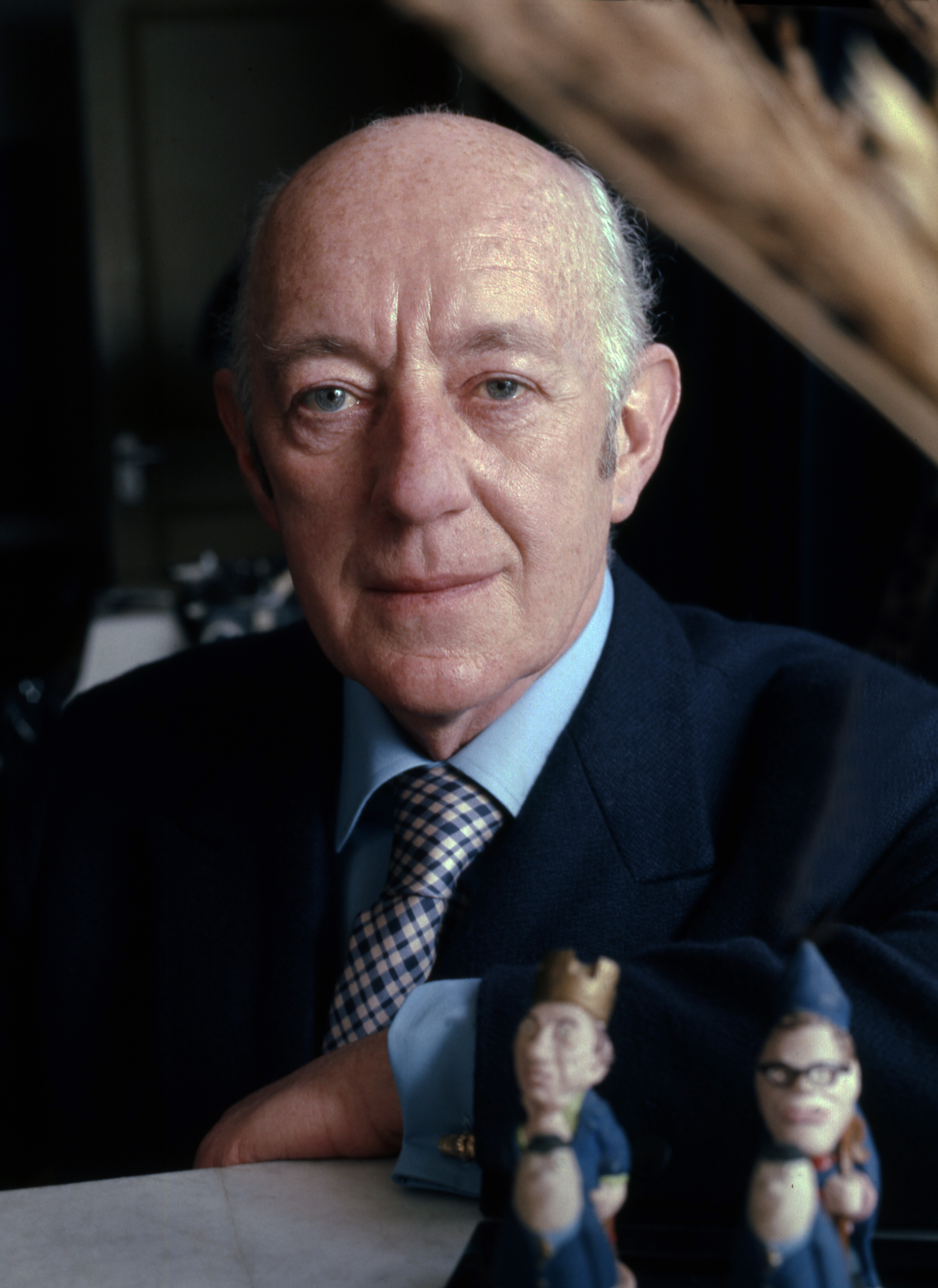
Alec Guinness won for The Bridge on the River Kwai (1957)

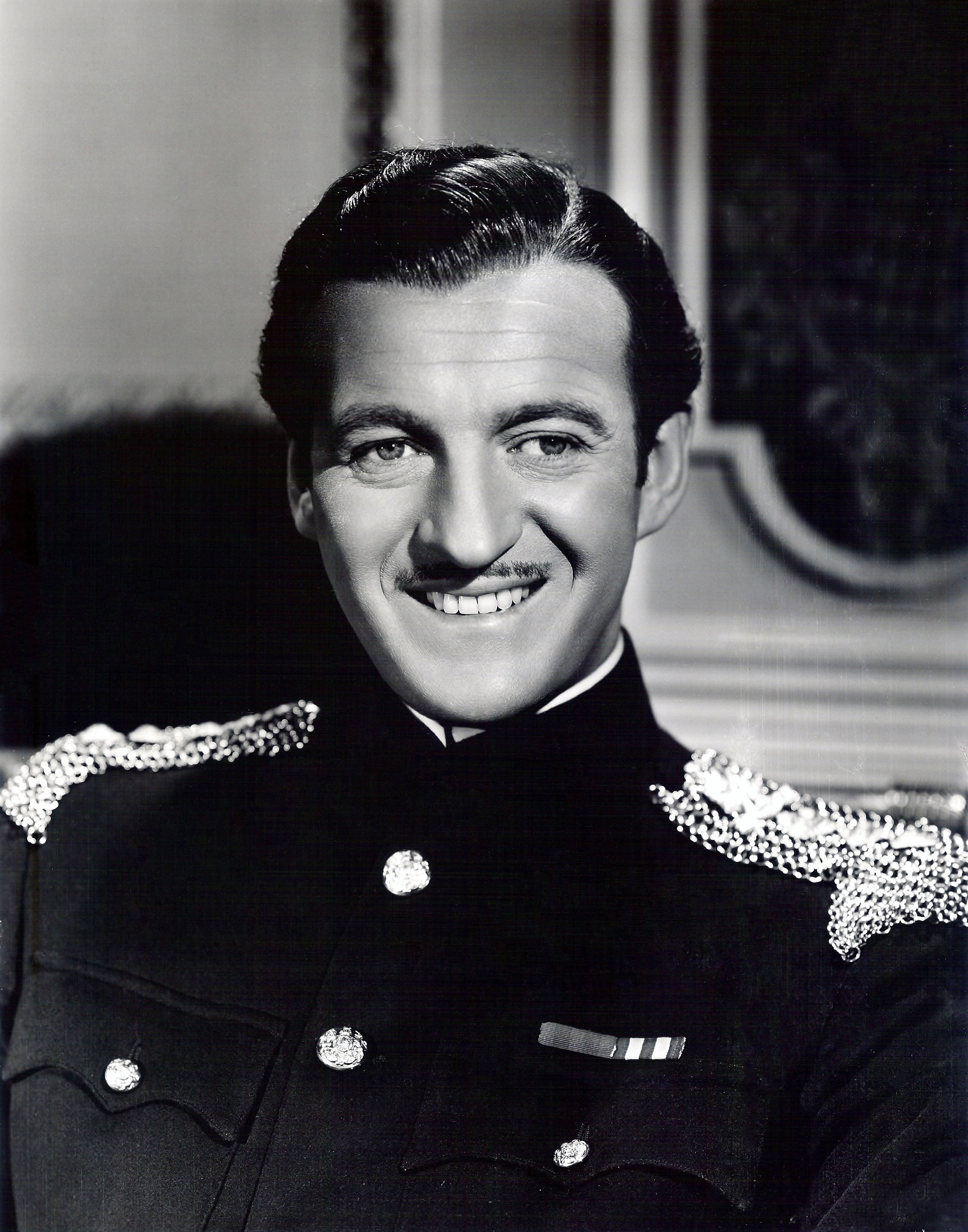
David Niven won for Separate Tables (1958)

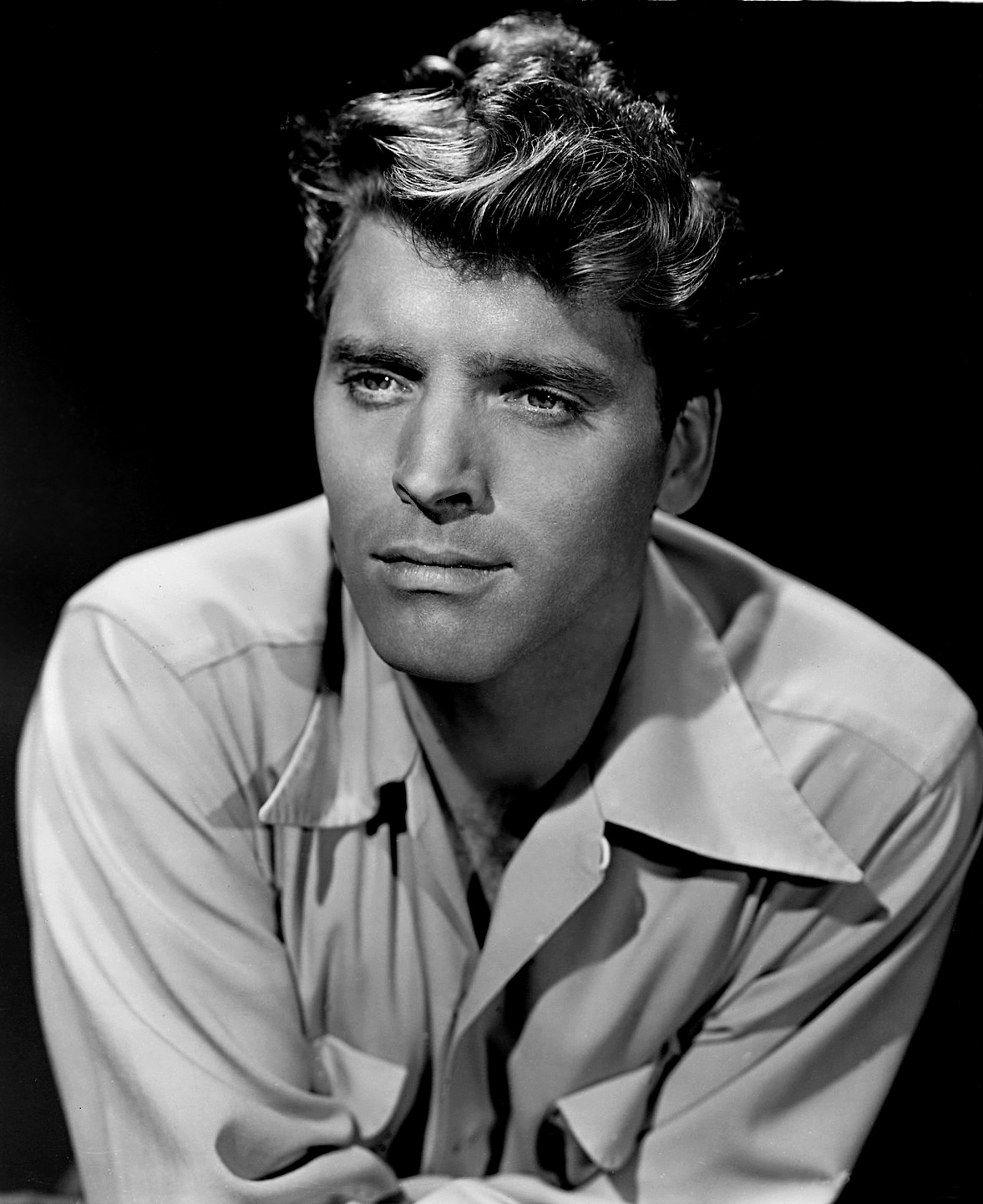
Burt Lancaster won for Elmer Gantry (1960)

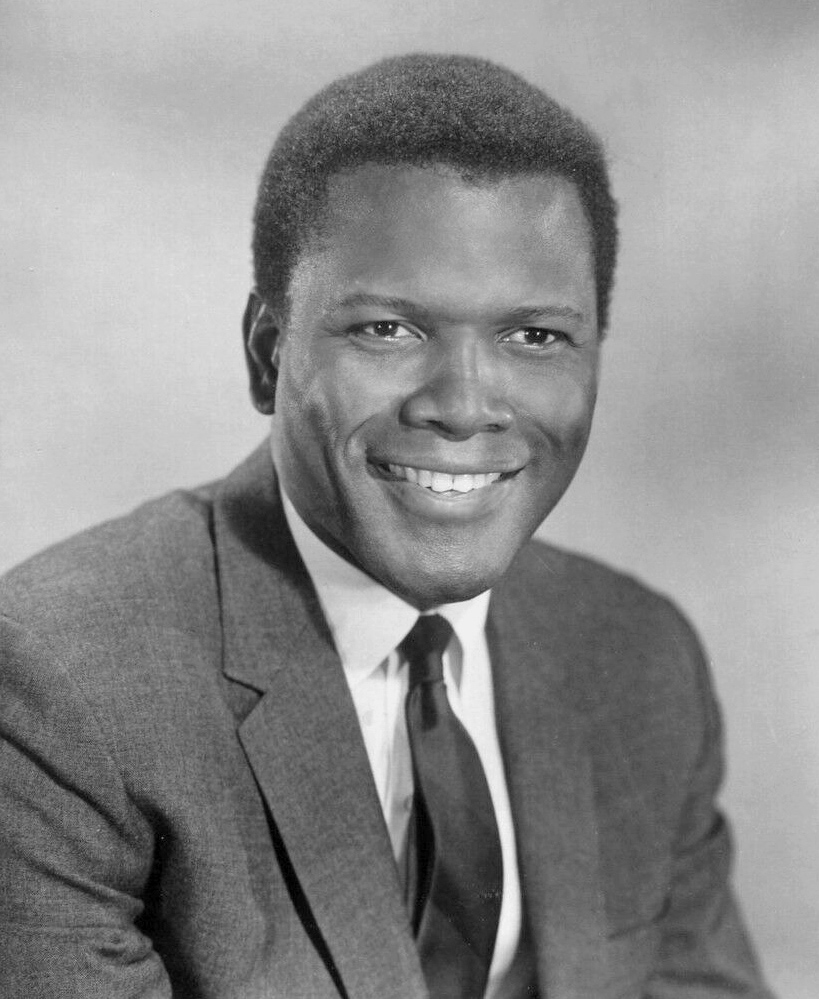
Sidney Poitier won for Lillies of the Field (1963)

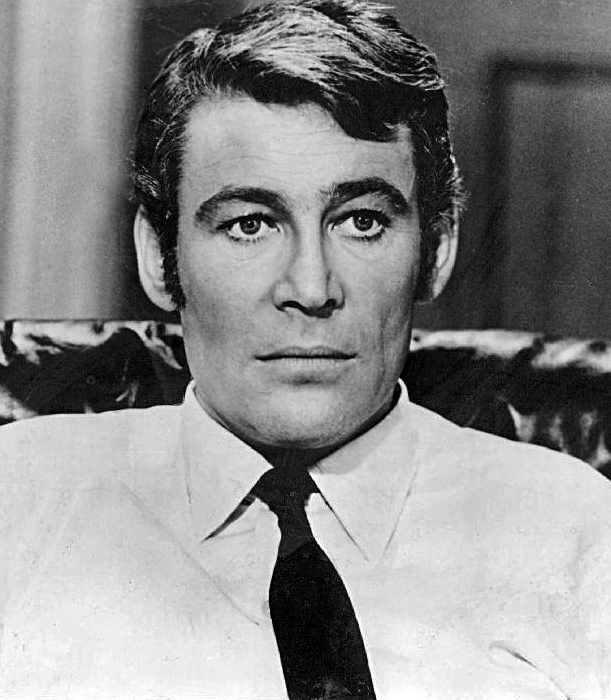
Peter O'Toole won twice for Becket (1964), and The Lion in Winter (1968)

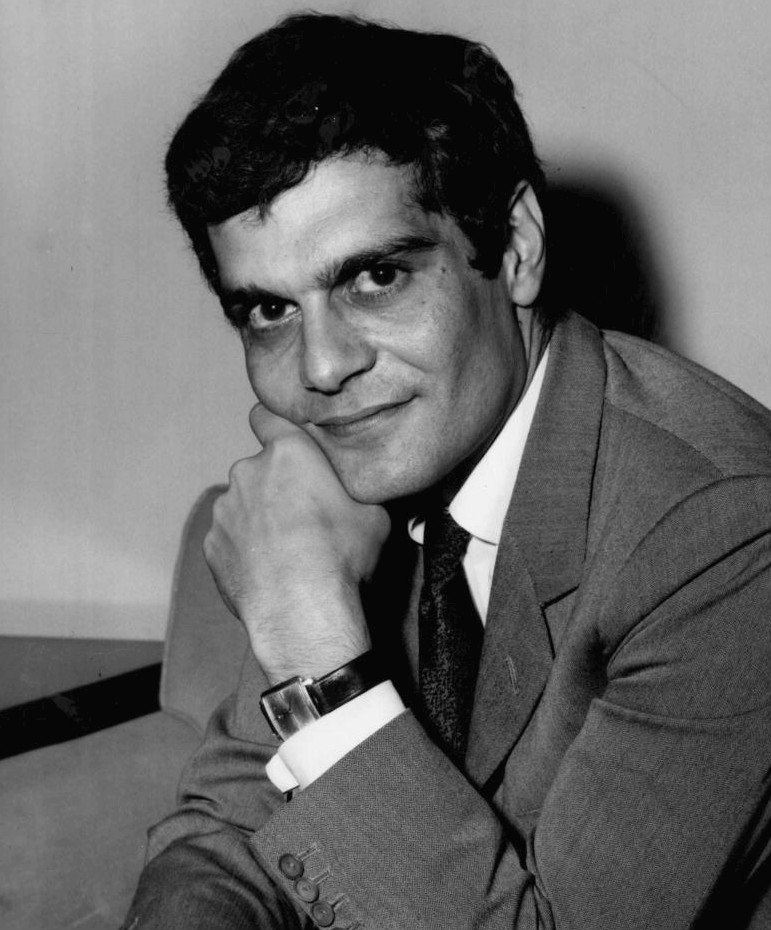
Omar Sharif won for Doctor Zhivago (1965)

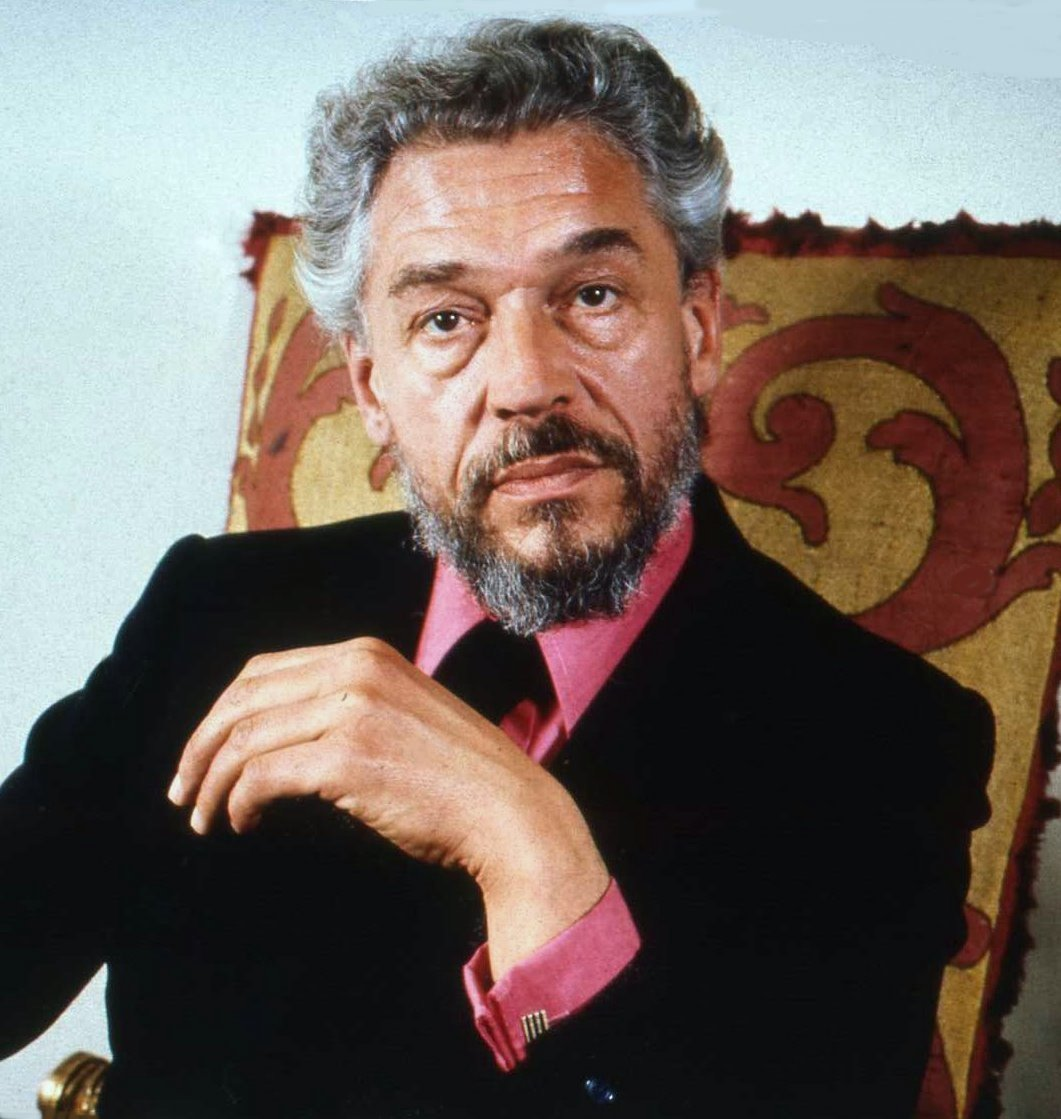
Paul Scofield won for A Man for All Seasons (1966)

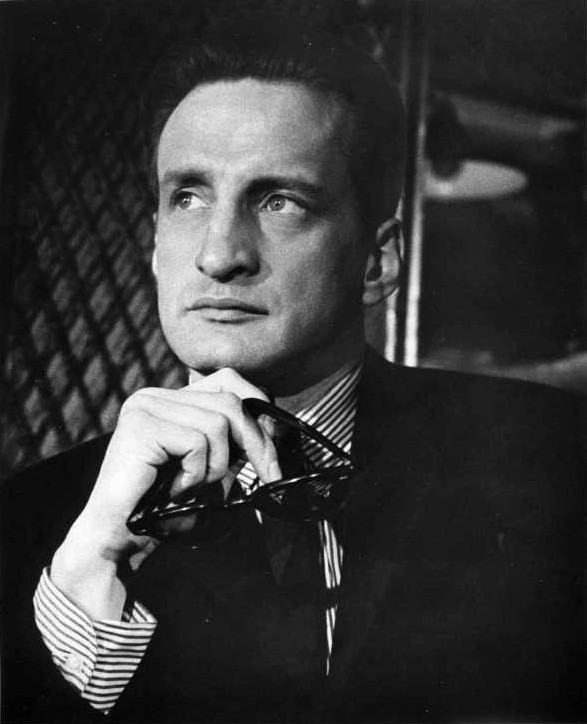
George C. Scott won for Patton (1970)

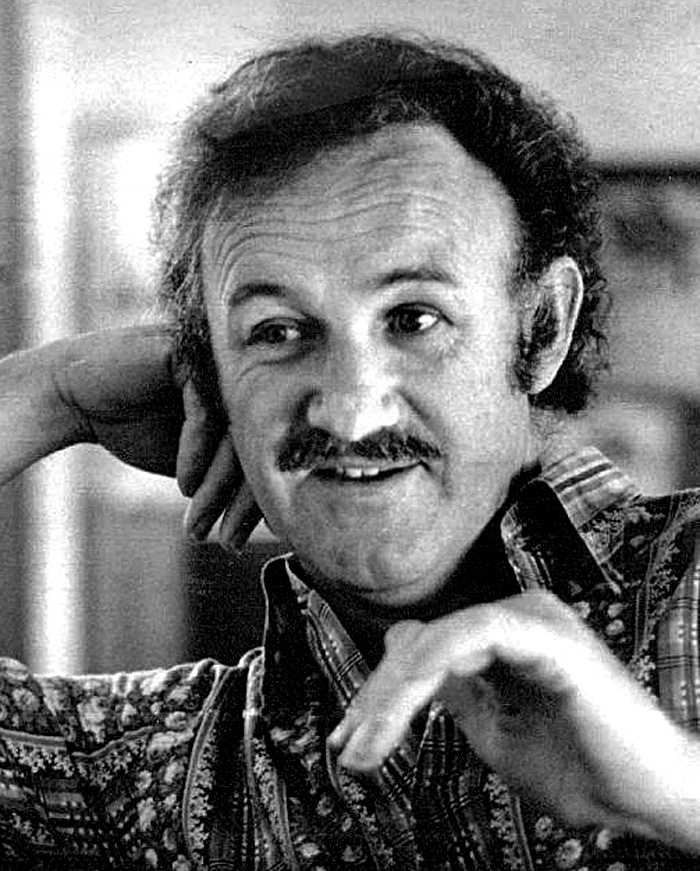
Gene Hackman won for The French Connection (1971)

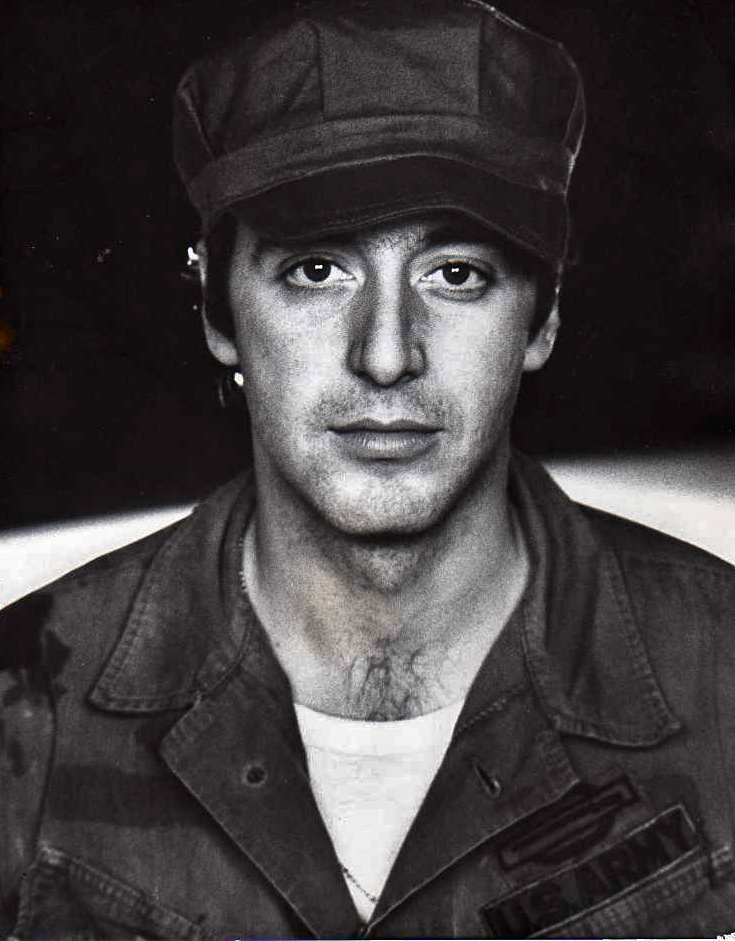
Al Pacino won twice for Serpico (1972) and Scent of a Woman (1992)

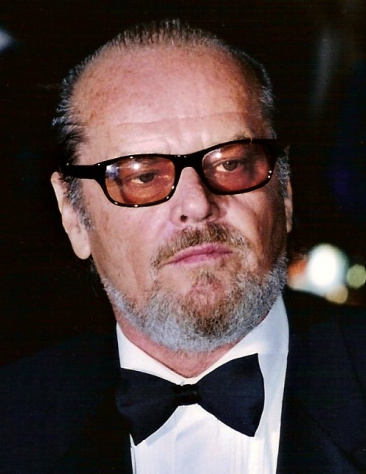
Jack Nicholson won thrice for Chinatown (1974), One Flew Over the Cuckoo's Nest (1975), and About Schmidt (2002)

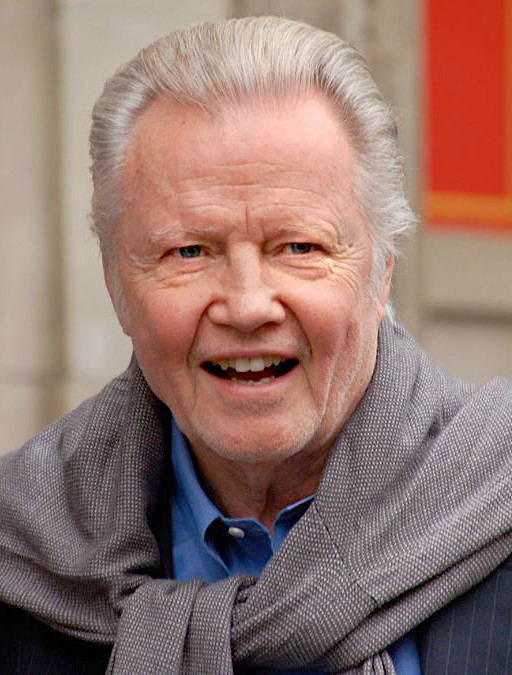
Jon Voight won twice Coming Home (1978) and Runaway Train (1985)

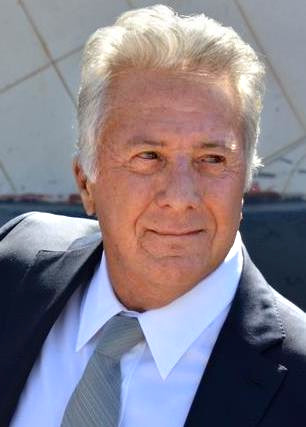
Dustin Hoffman won twice for Kramer vs. Kramer (1979) and Rain Man (1988)

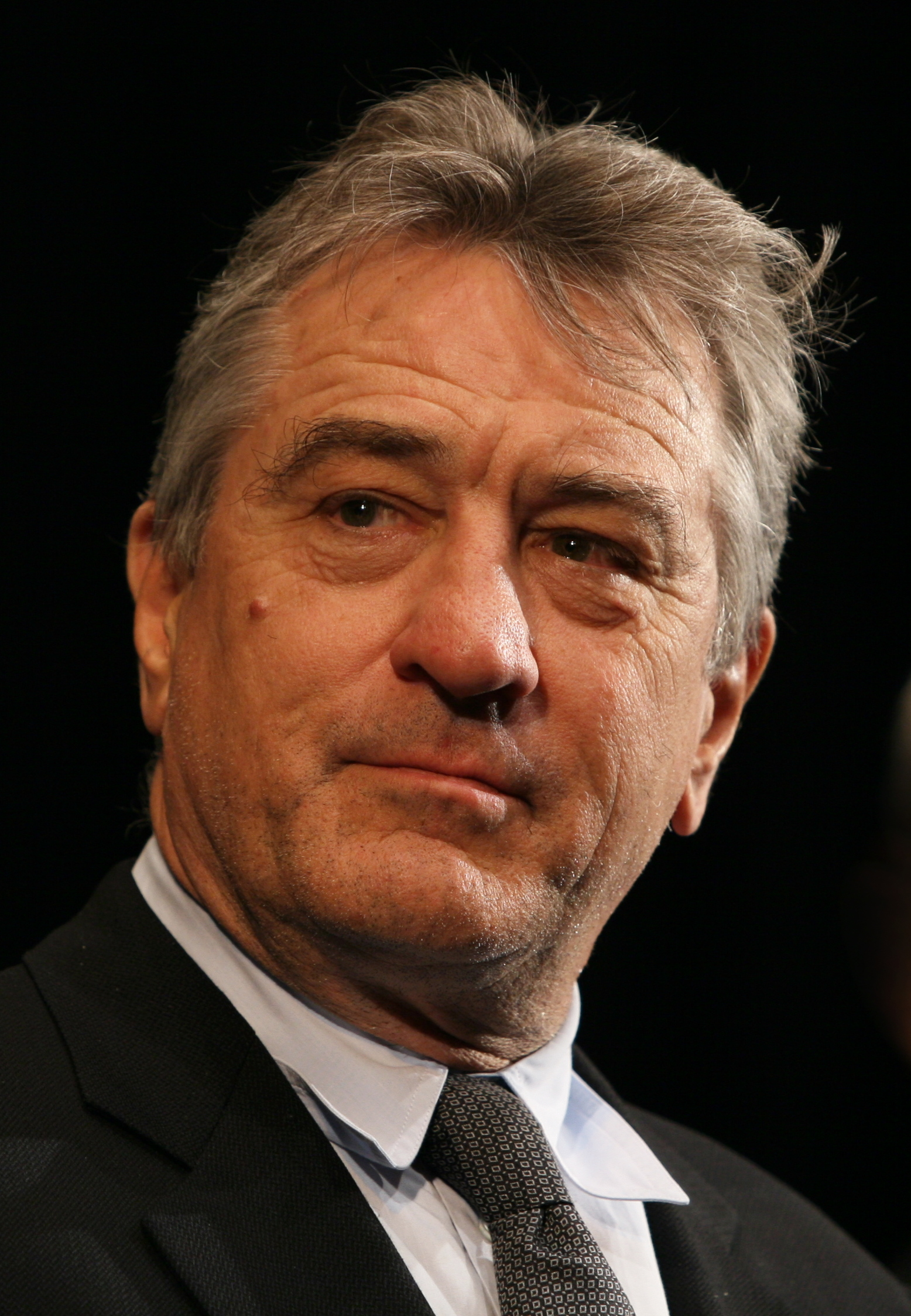
Robert De Niro won for Raging Bull (1980)

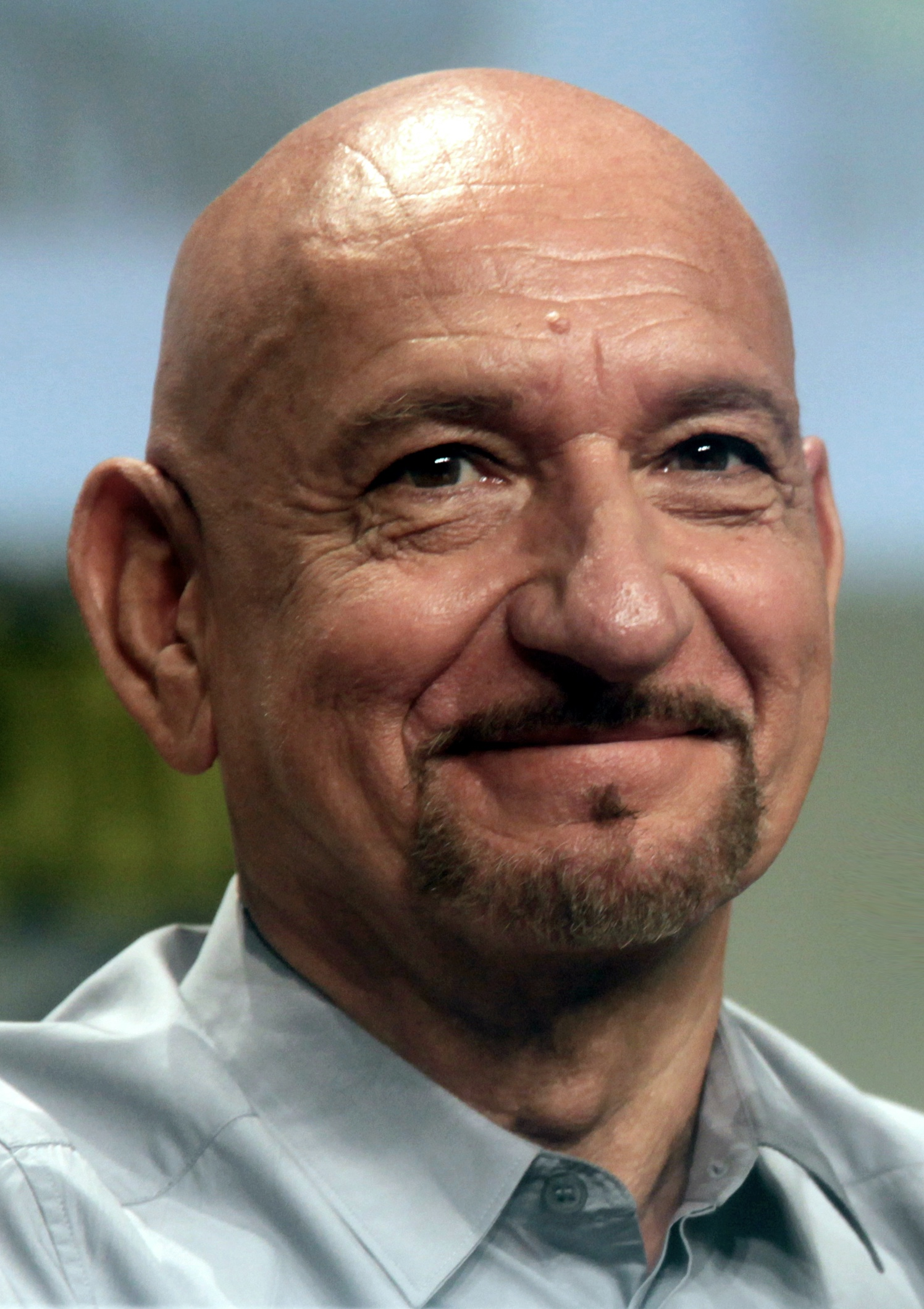
Ben Kingsley won for Gandhi (1982)

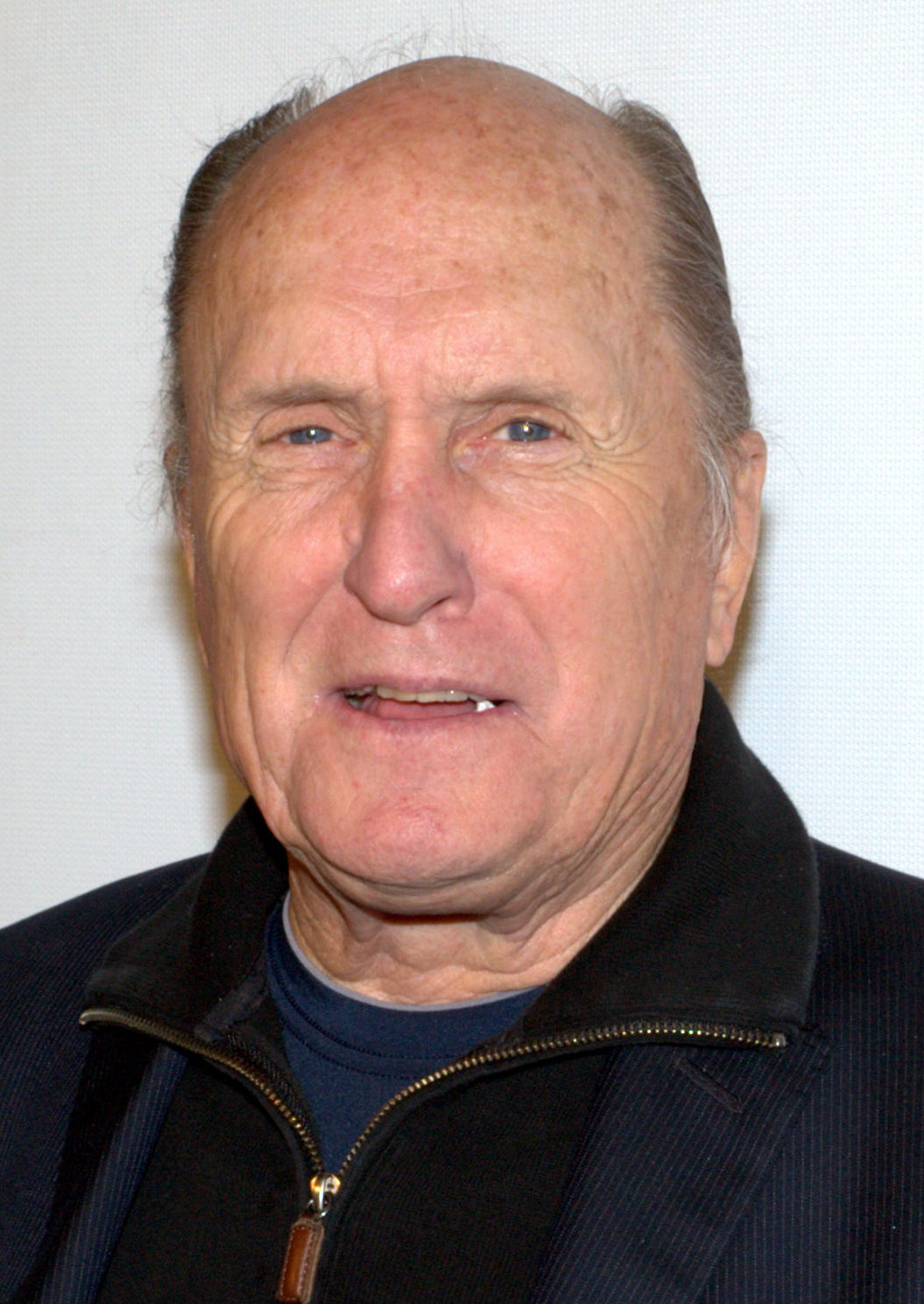
Robert Duvall won for Tender Mercies (1983)

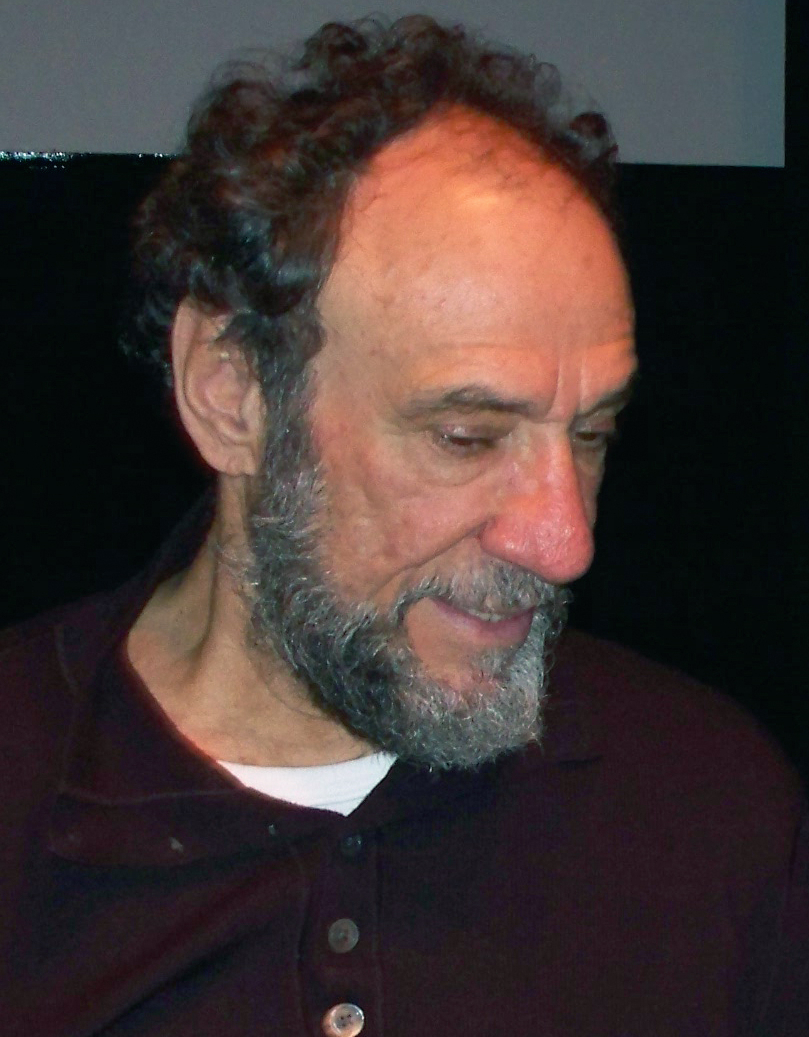
F. Murray Abraham won for Amadeus (1984)

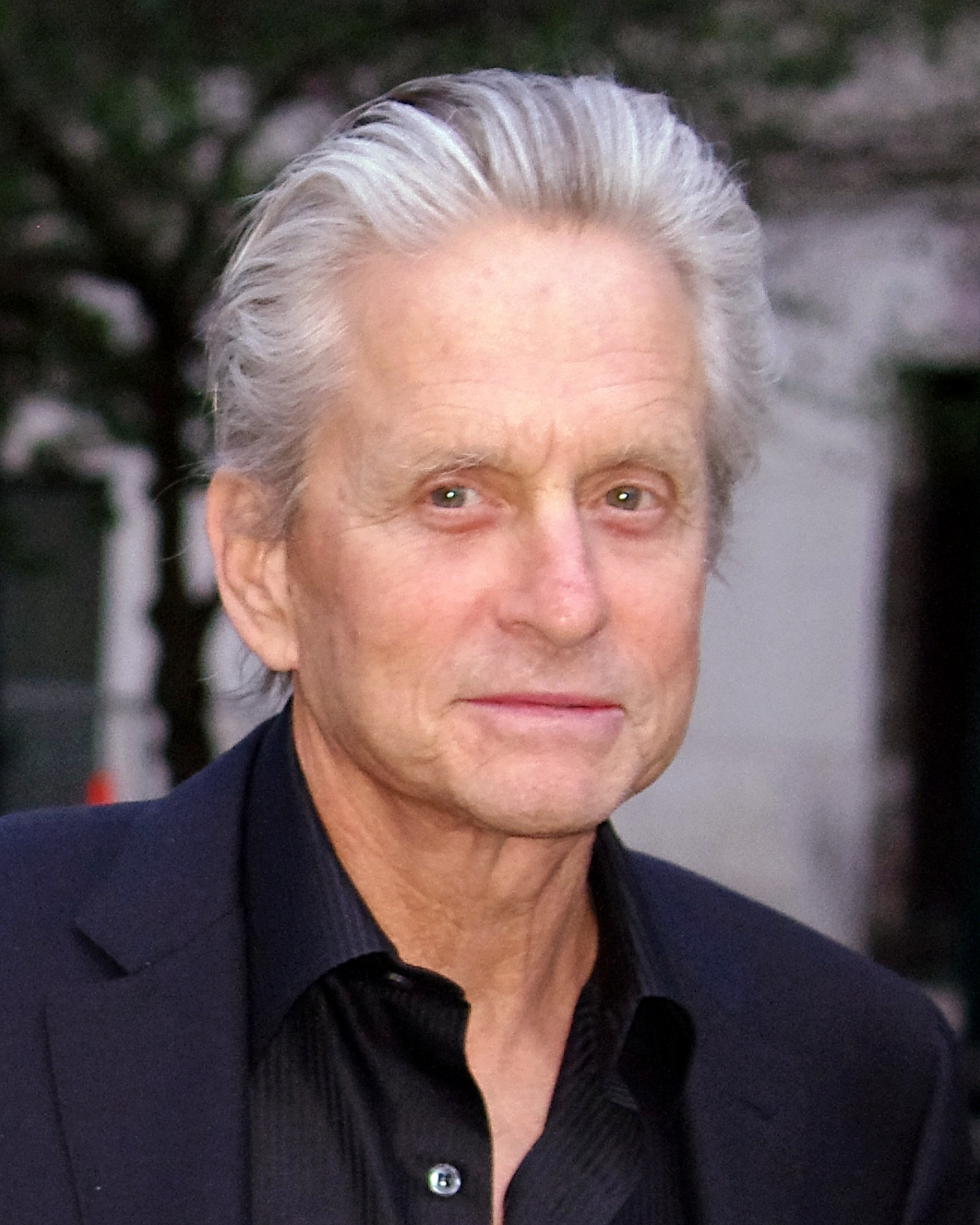
Michael Douglas won for Wall Street (1987)

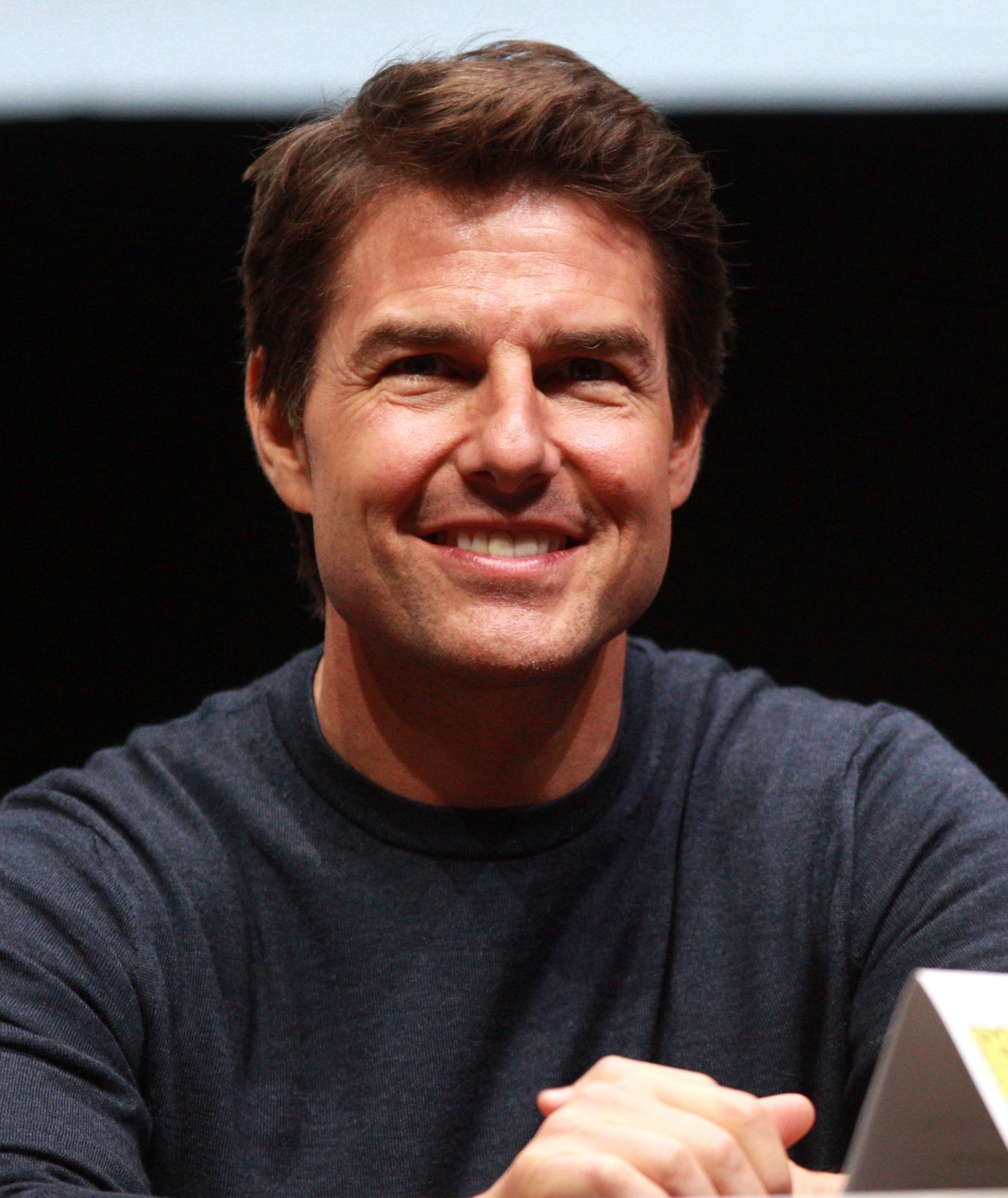
Tom Cruise won for Born on the Fourth of July (1989)

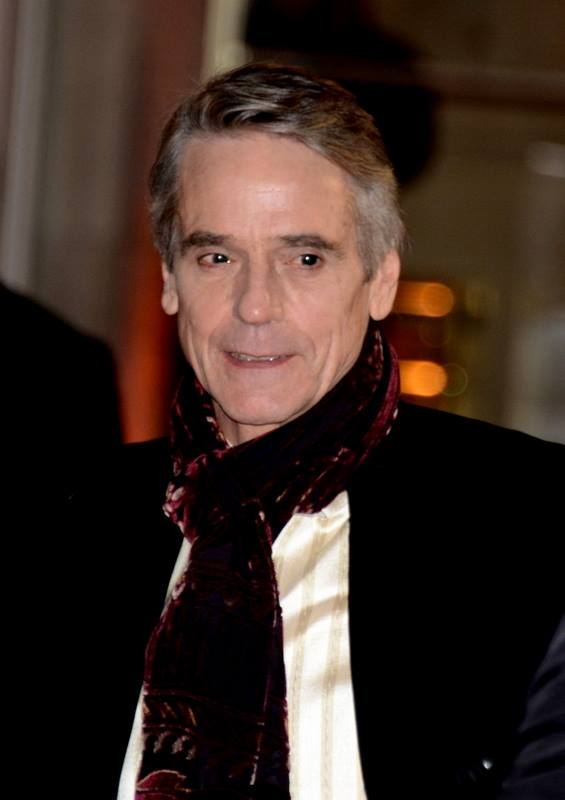
Jeremy Irons won for Reversal of Fortune (1990)

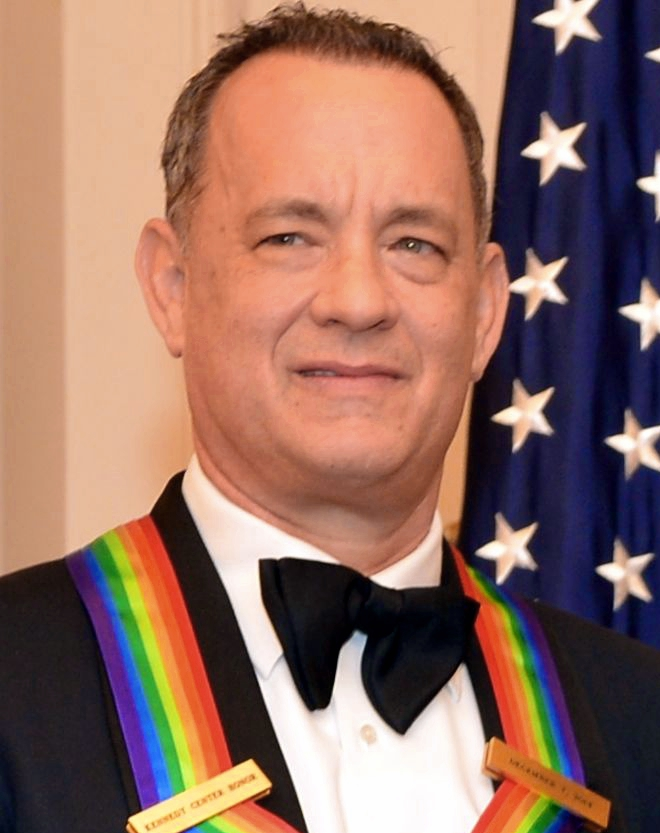
Tom Hanks won thrice Philadelphia (1993), Forrest Gump (1994), and Cast Away (2000)

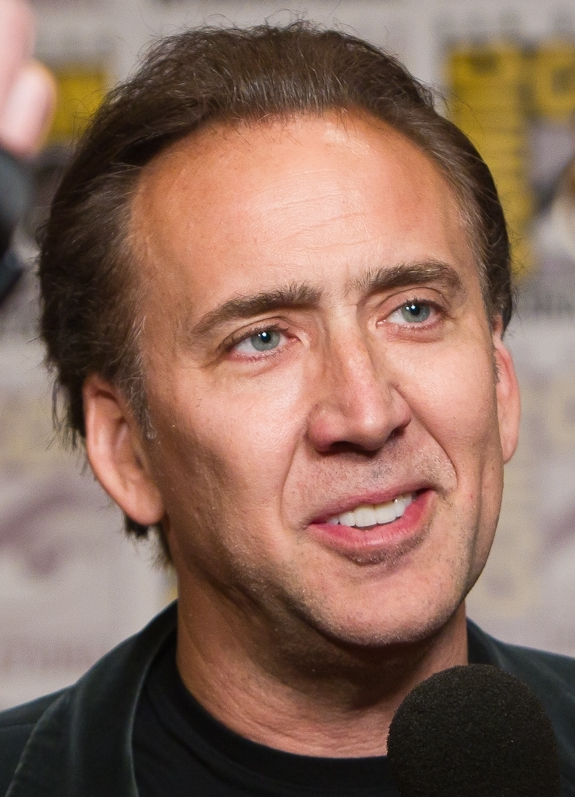
Nicolas Cage won for Leaving Las Vegas (1995)

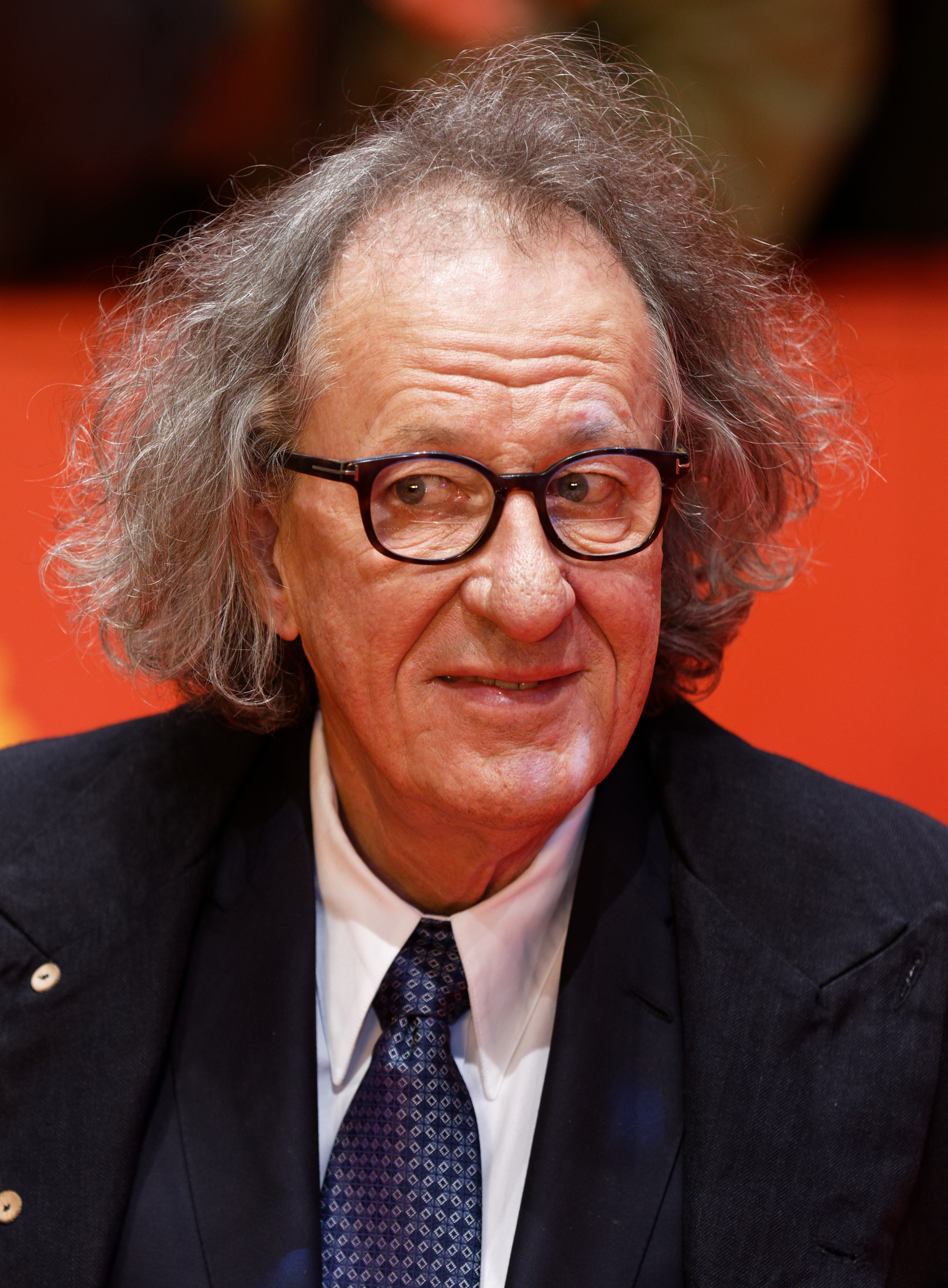
Geoffrey Rush won for Shine (1996)

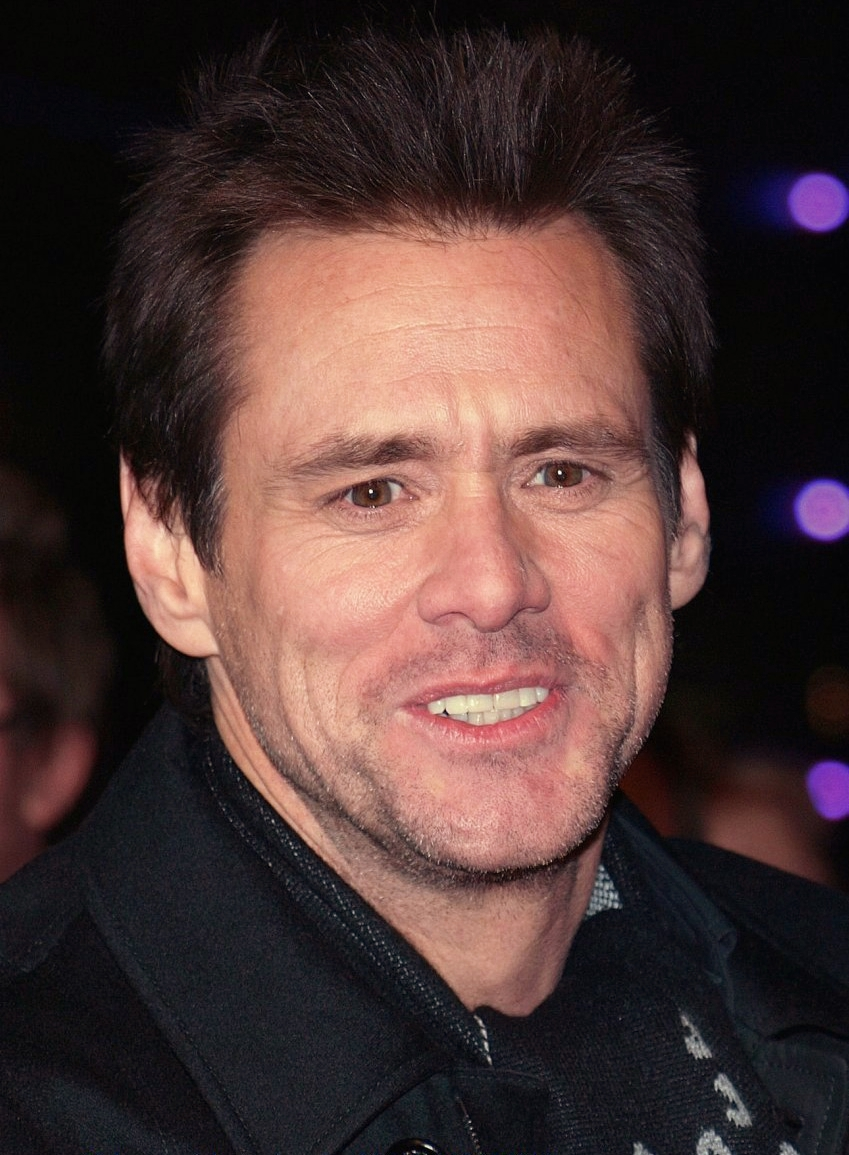
Jim Carrey won for The Truman Show (1998)

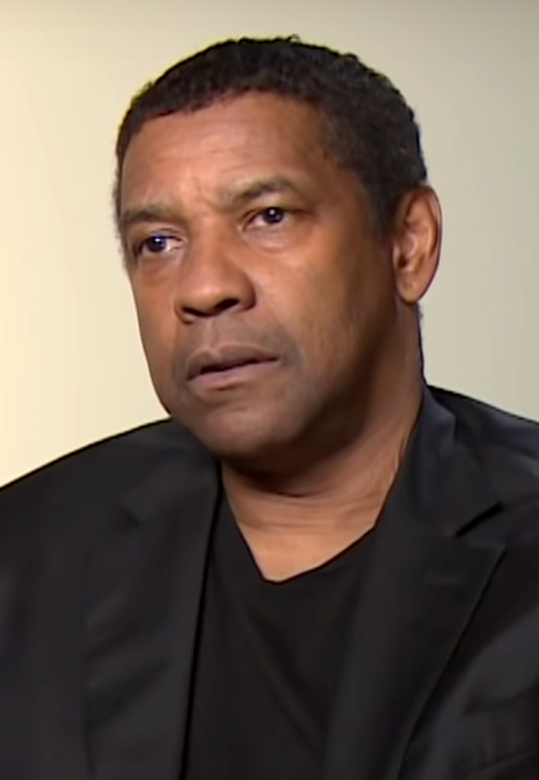
Denzel Washington won for The Hurricane (1999)

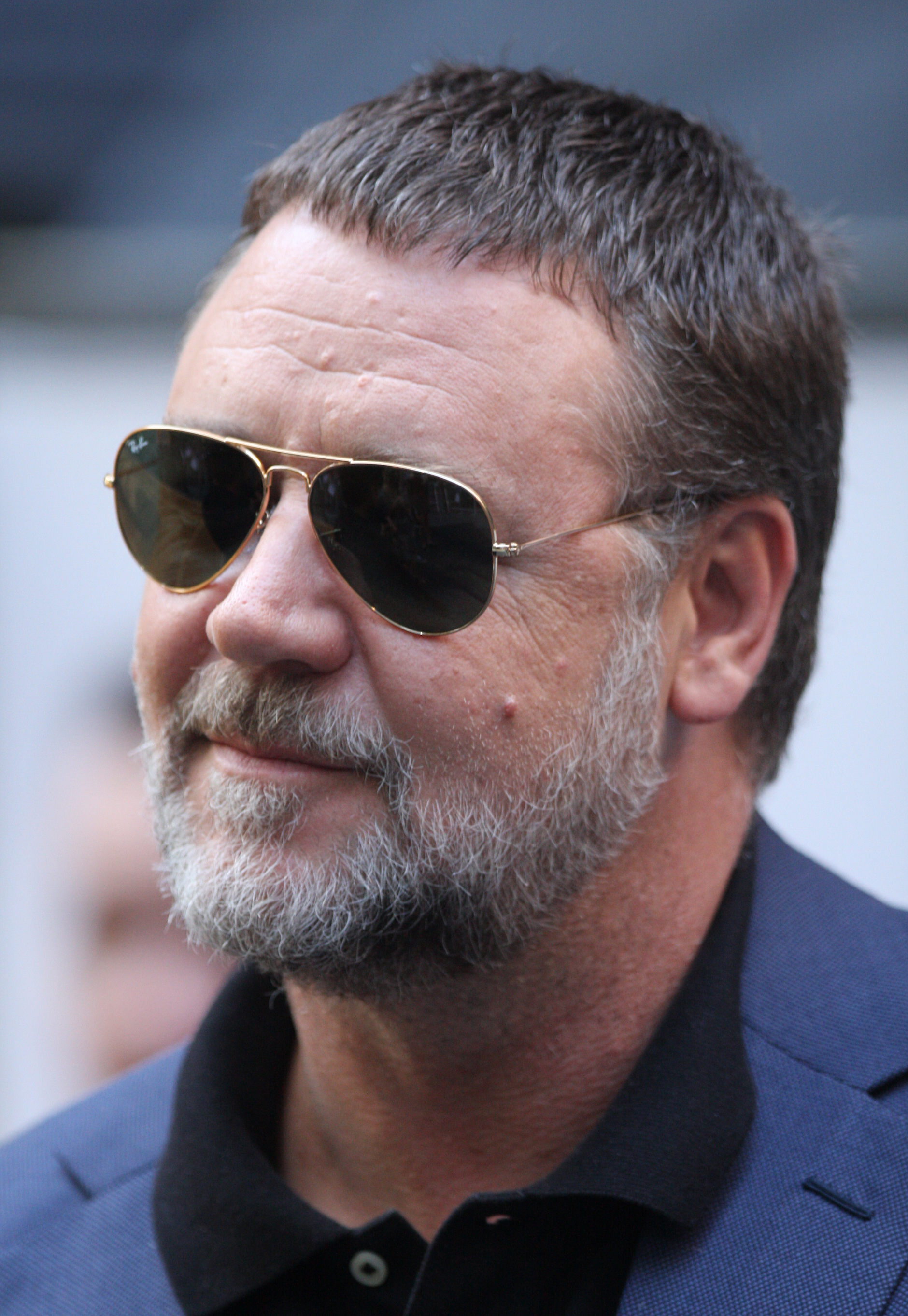
Russell Crowe won for A Beautiful Mind (2001)

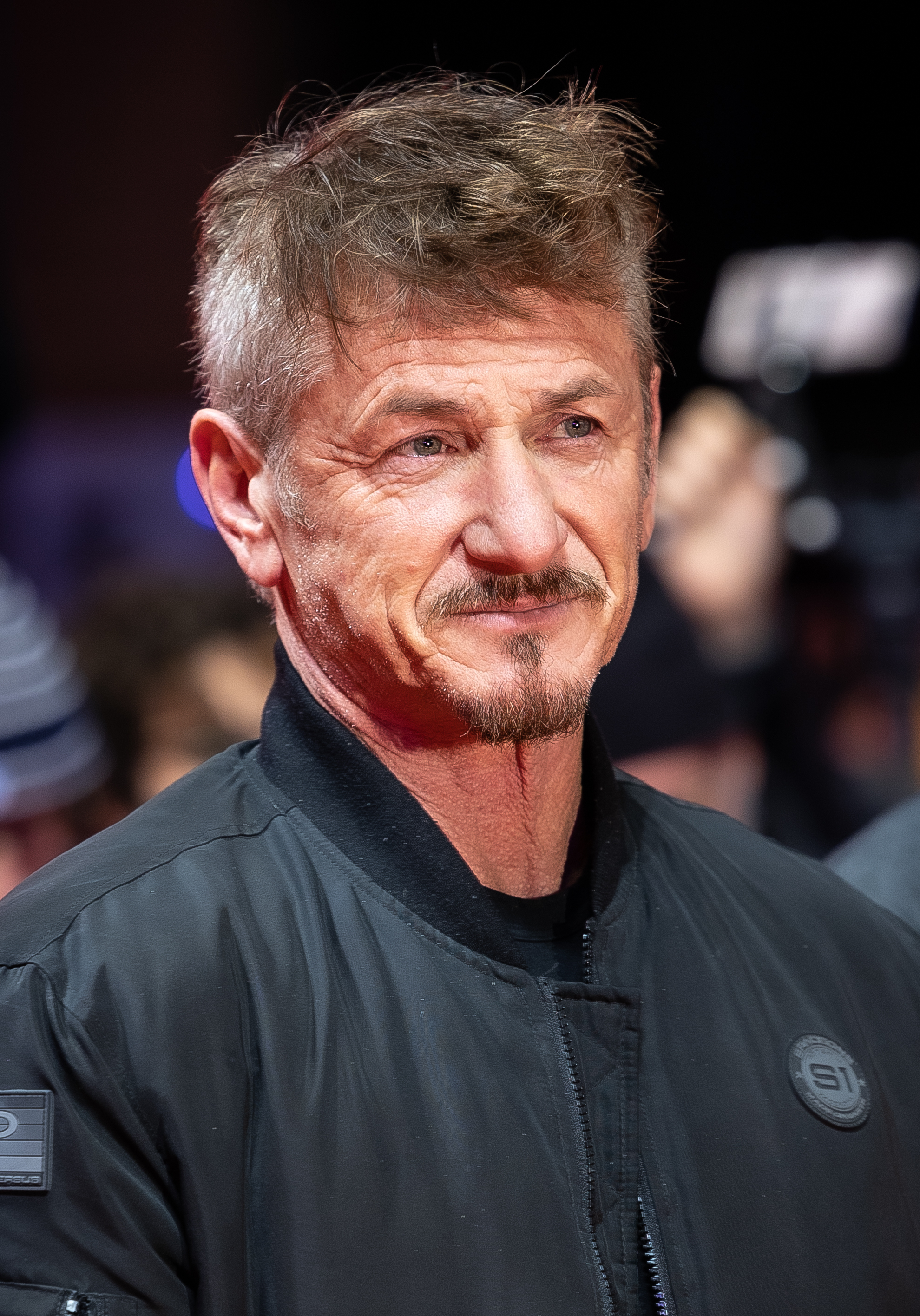
Sean Penn won for Mystic River (2003)

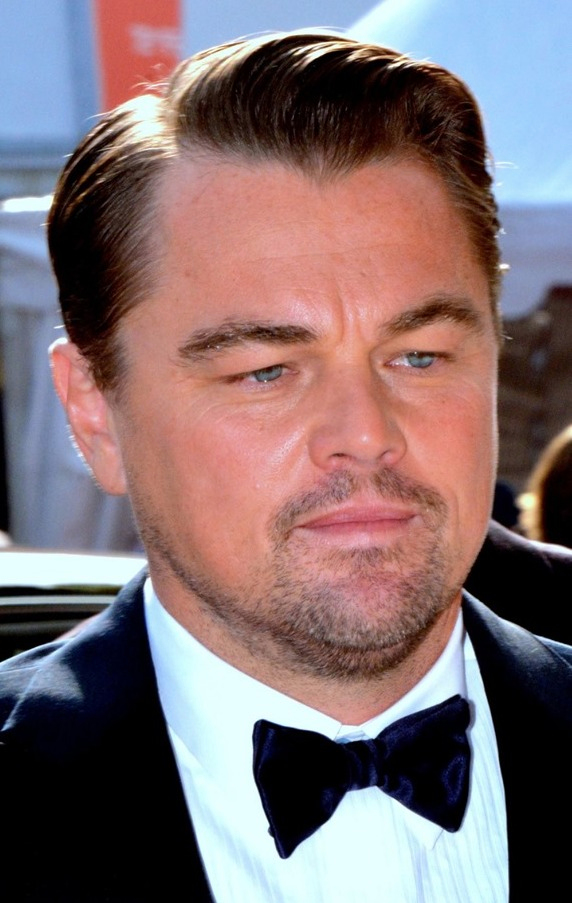
Leonardo DiCaprio won twice for The Aviator (2004) and The Revenant (2015)

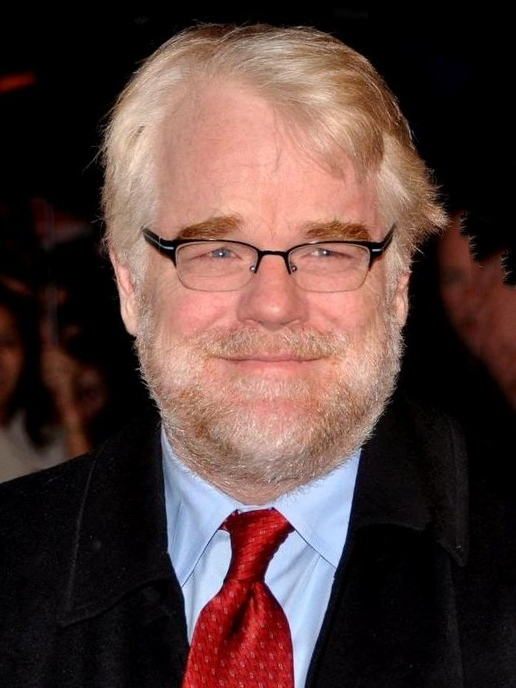
Philip Seymour Hoffman won for Capote (2005)

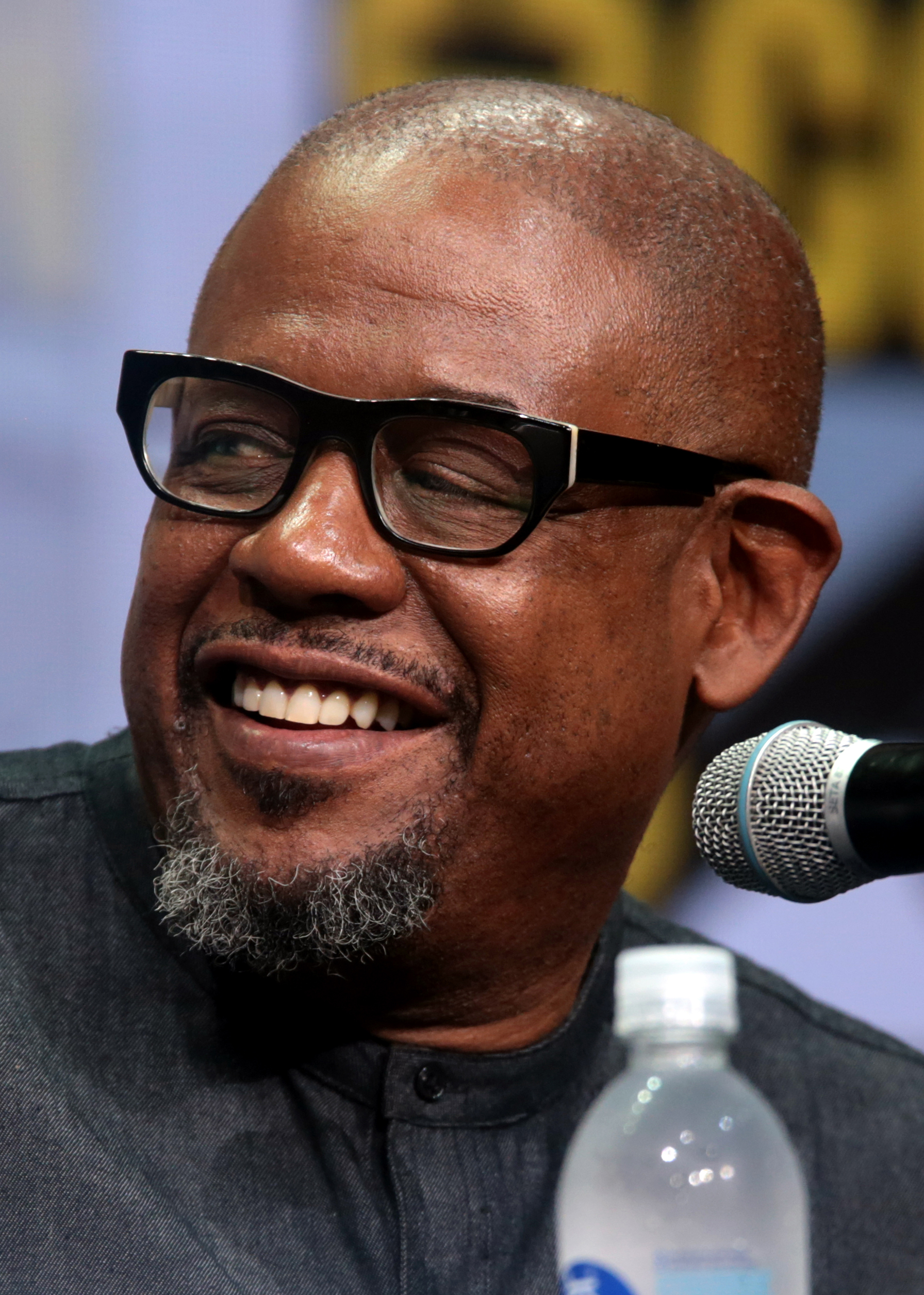
Forest Whitaker won for The Last King of Scotland (2006)

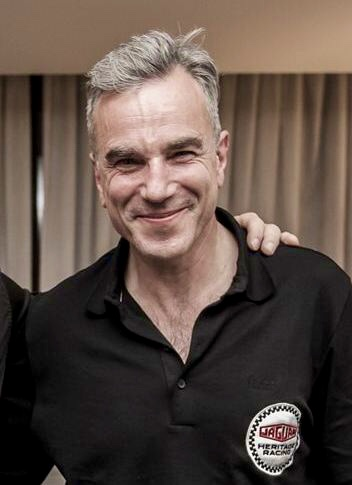
Daniel Day-Lewis won twice for There Will Be Blood and Lincoln (2012)

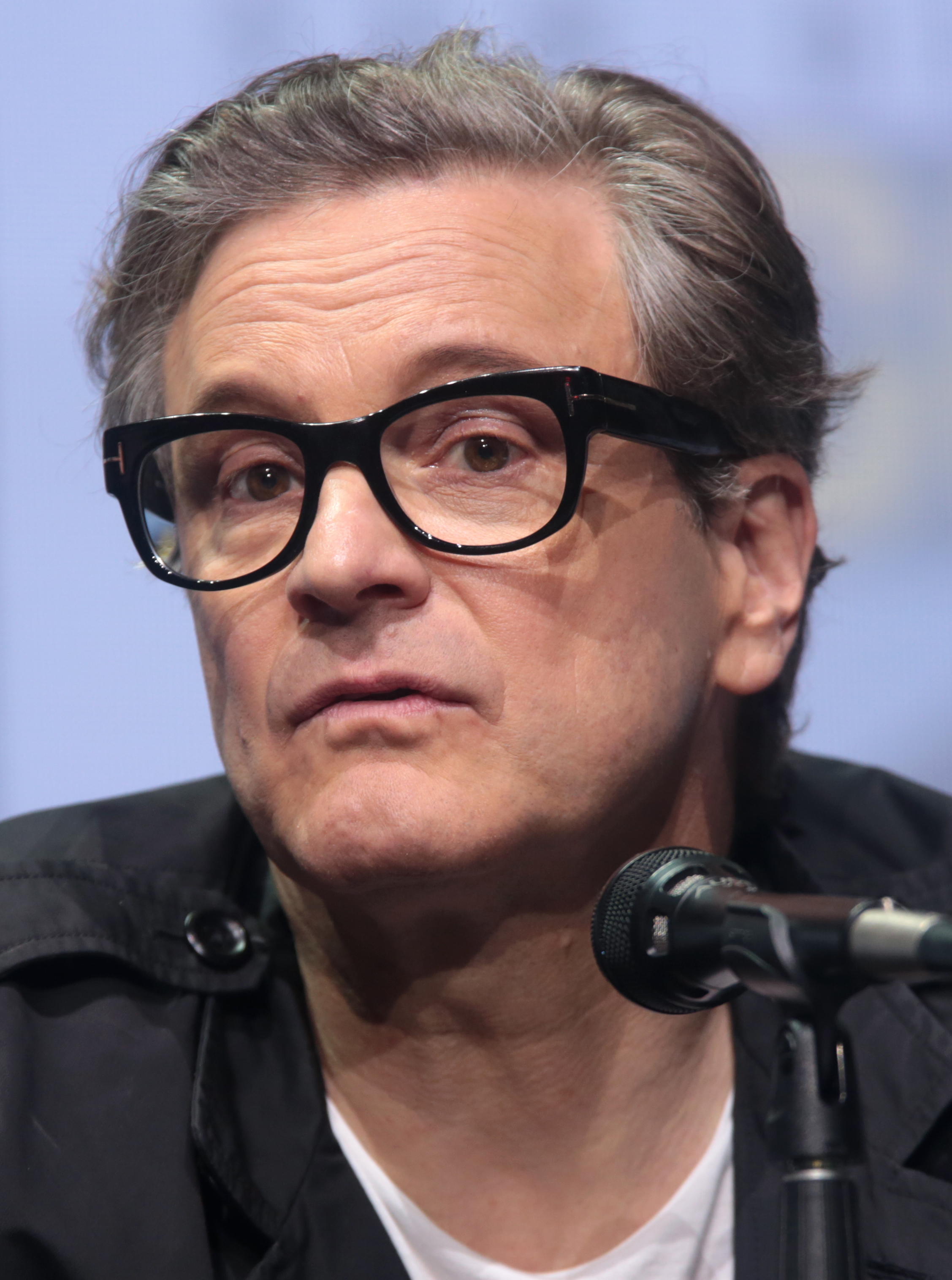
Colin Firth won for The King's Speech (2010)

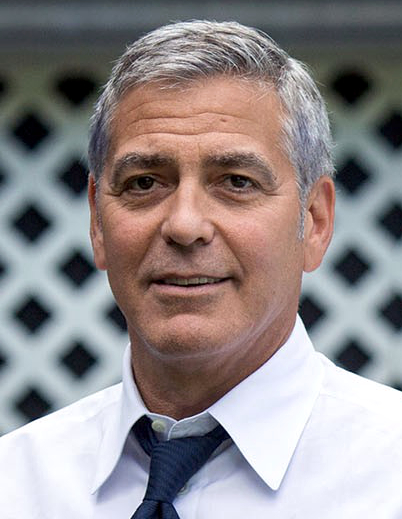
George Clooney won for The Descendants (2011)

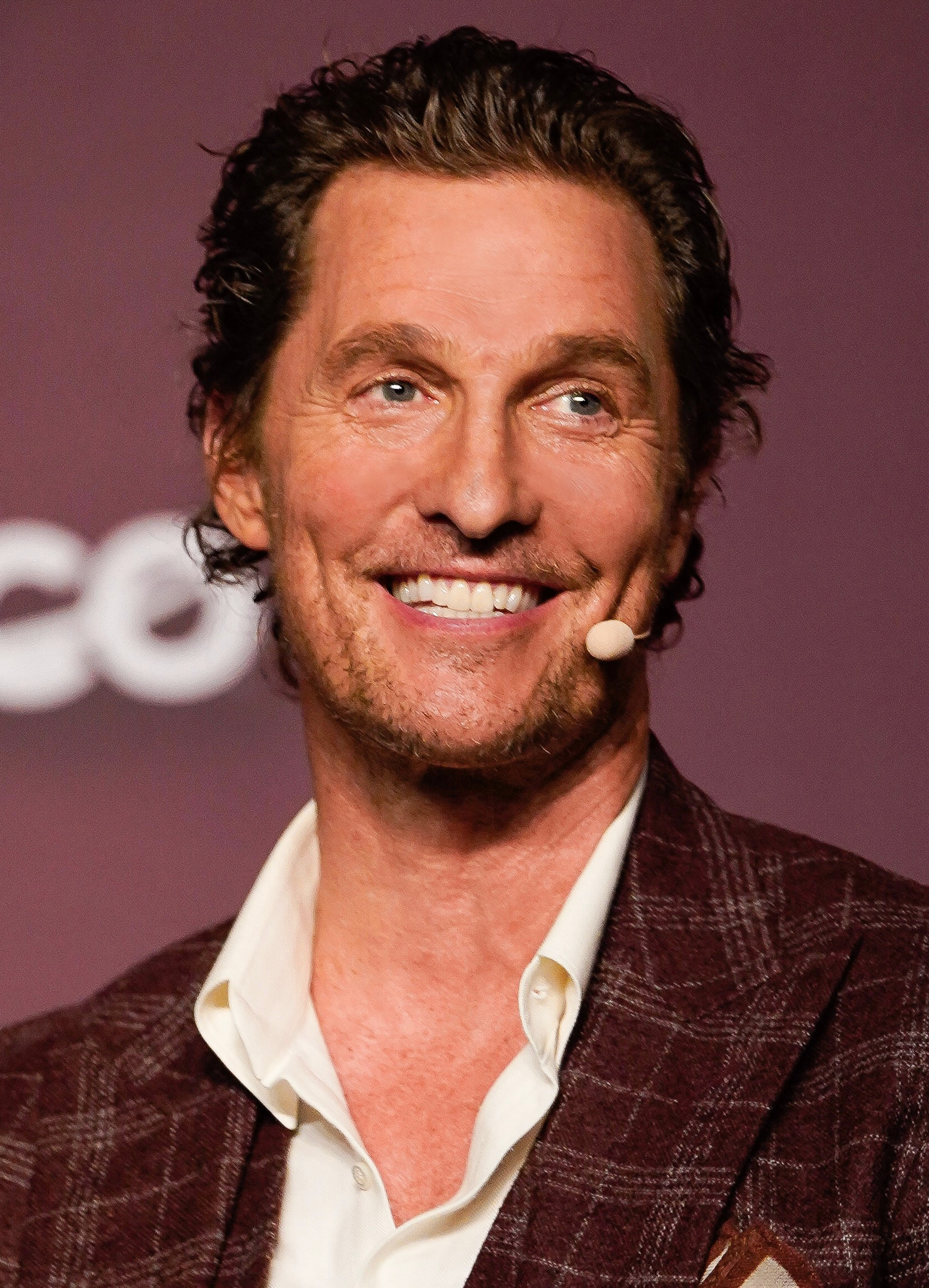
Matthew McConaughey won for Dallas Buyers Club (2013)

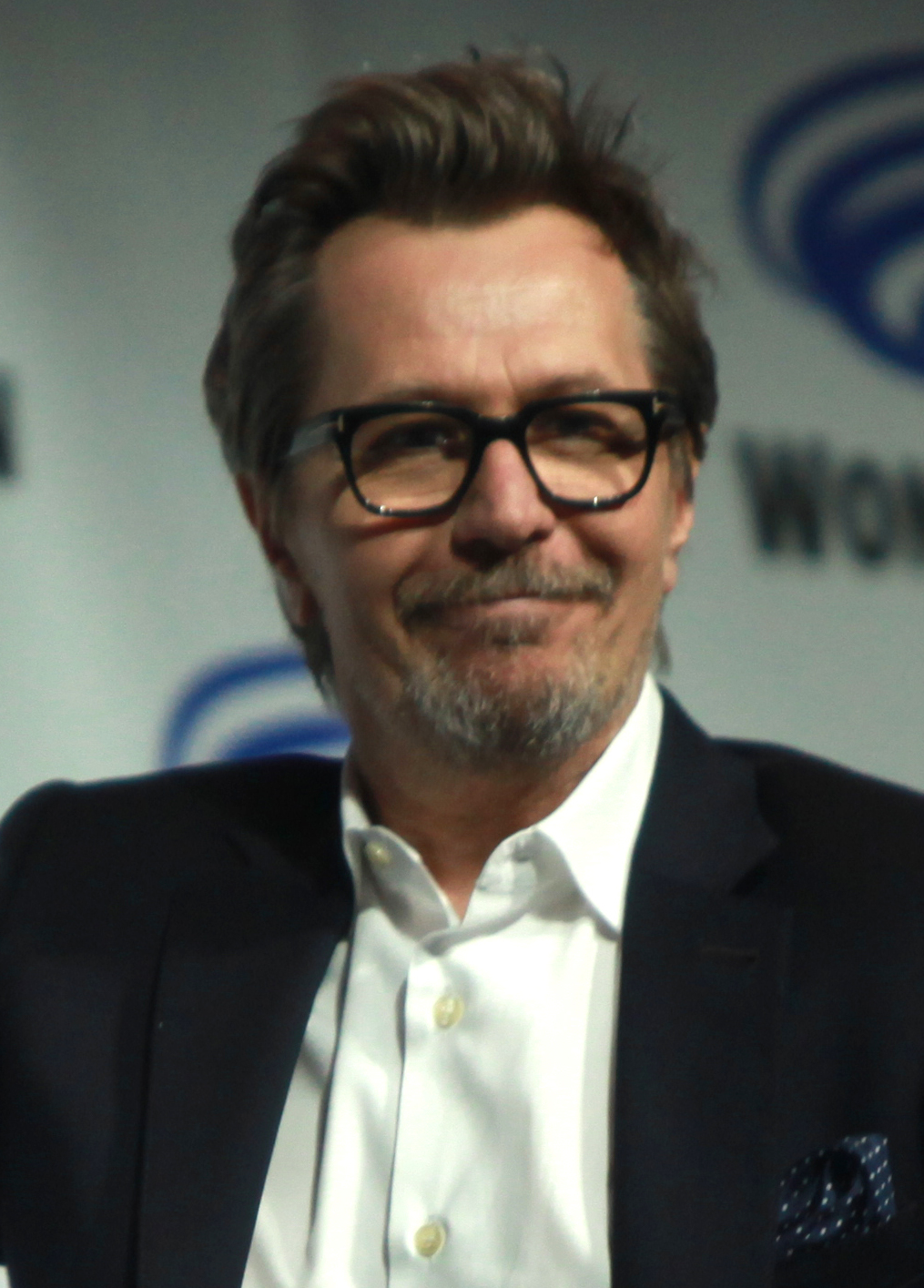
Gary Oldman won for Darkest Hour (2017)

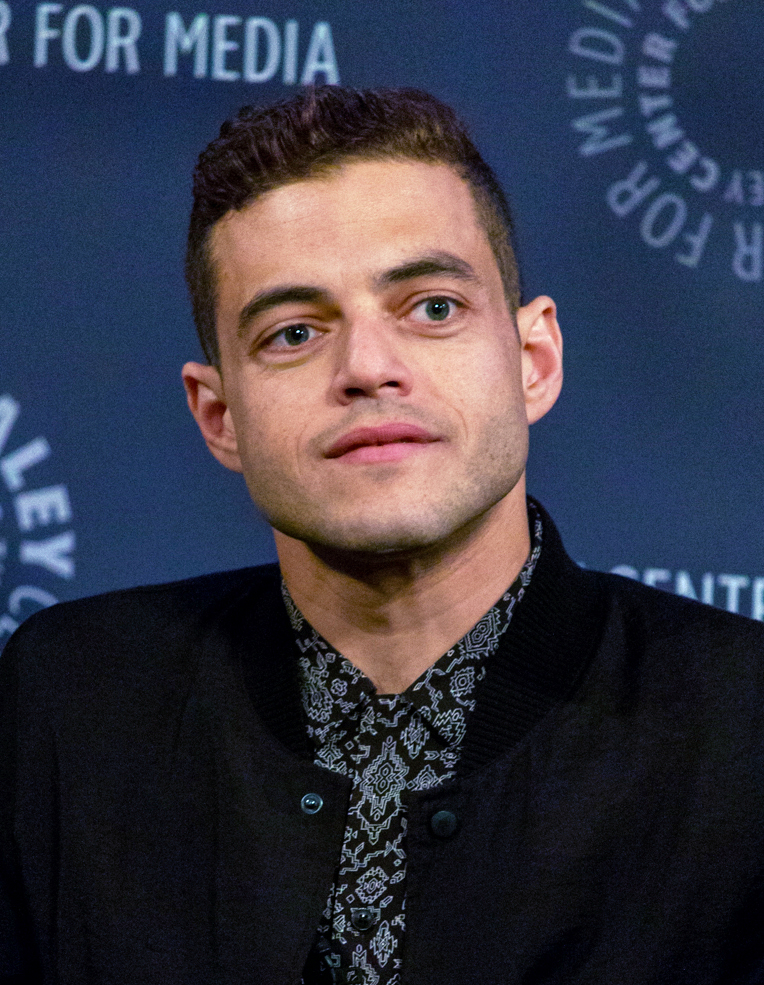
Rami Malek won for Bohemian Rhapsody (2018)

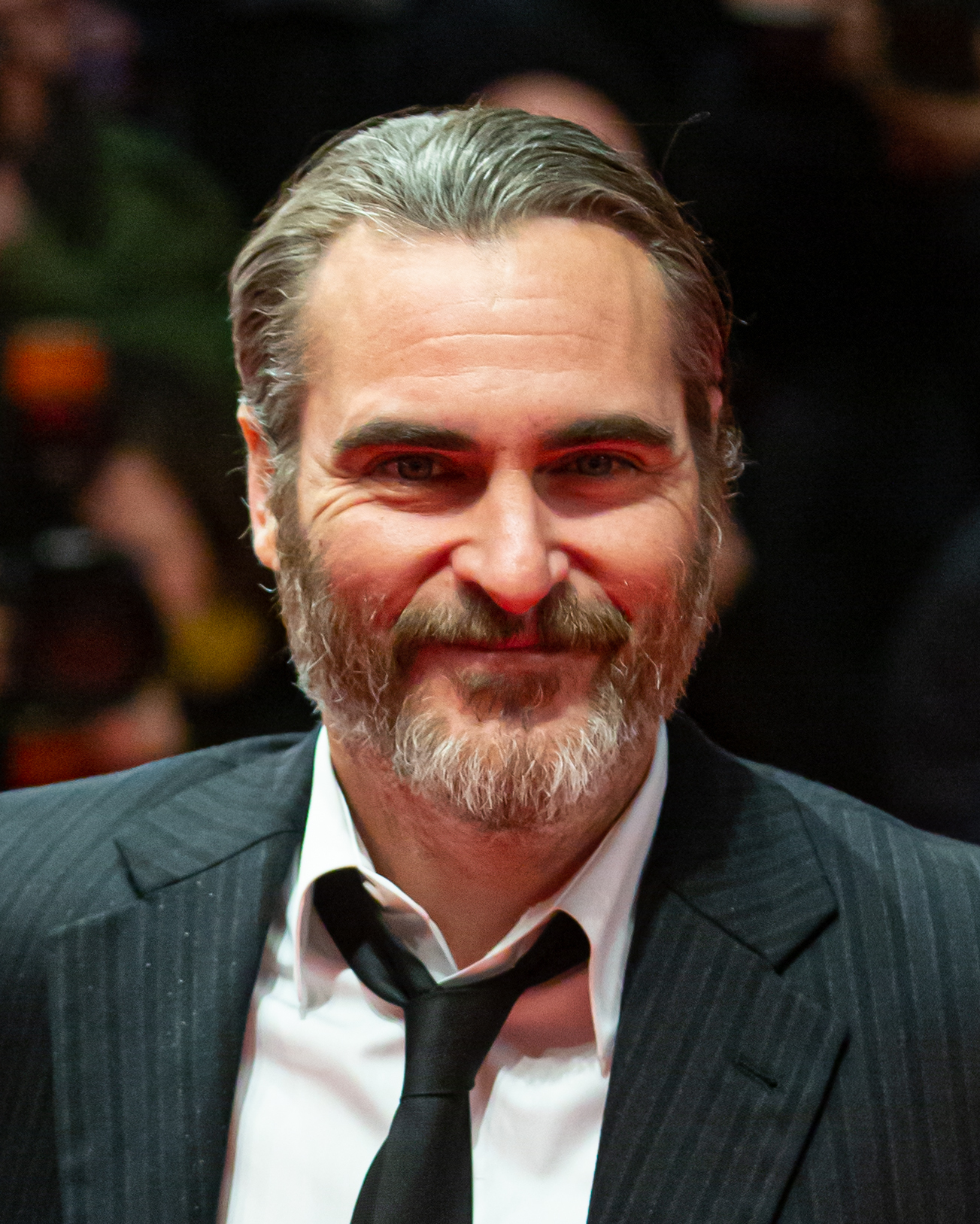
Joaquin Phoenix won for Joker (2019)

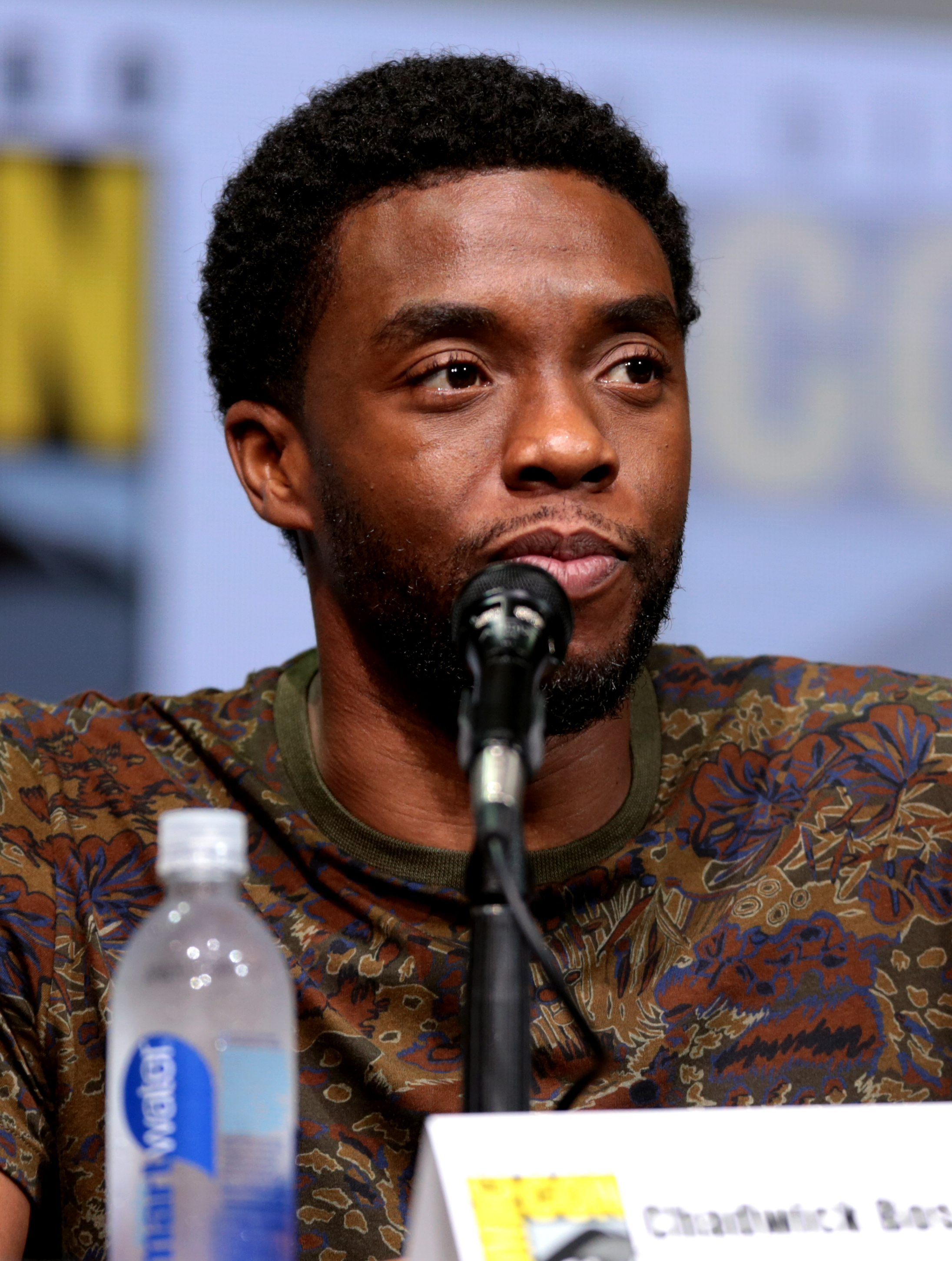
Chadwick Boseman won for Ma Rainey's Black Bottom (2020)

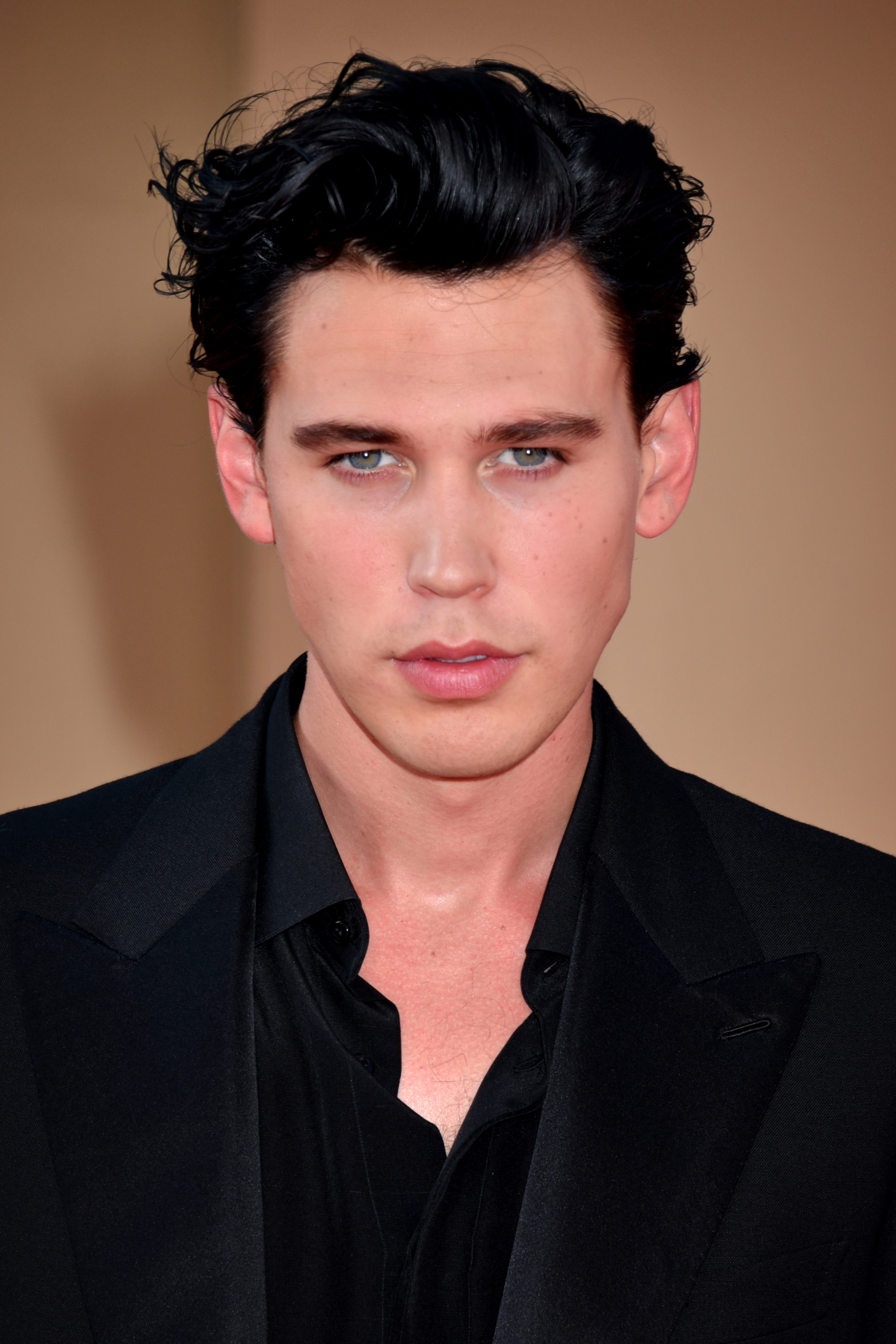
Austin Butler won for Elvis (2022)

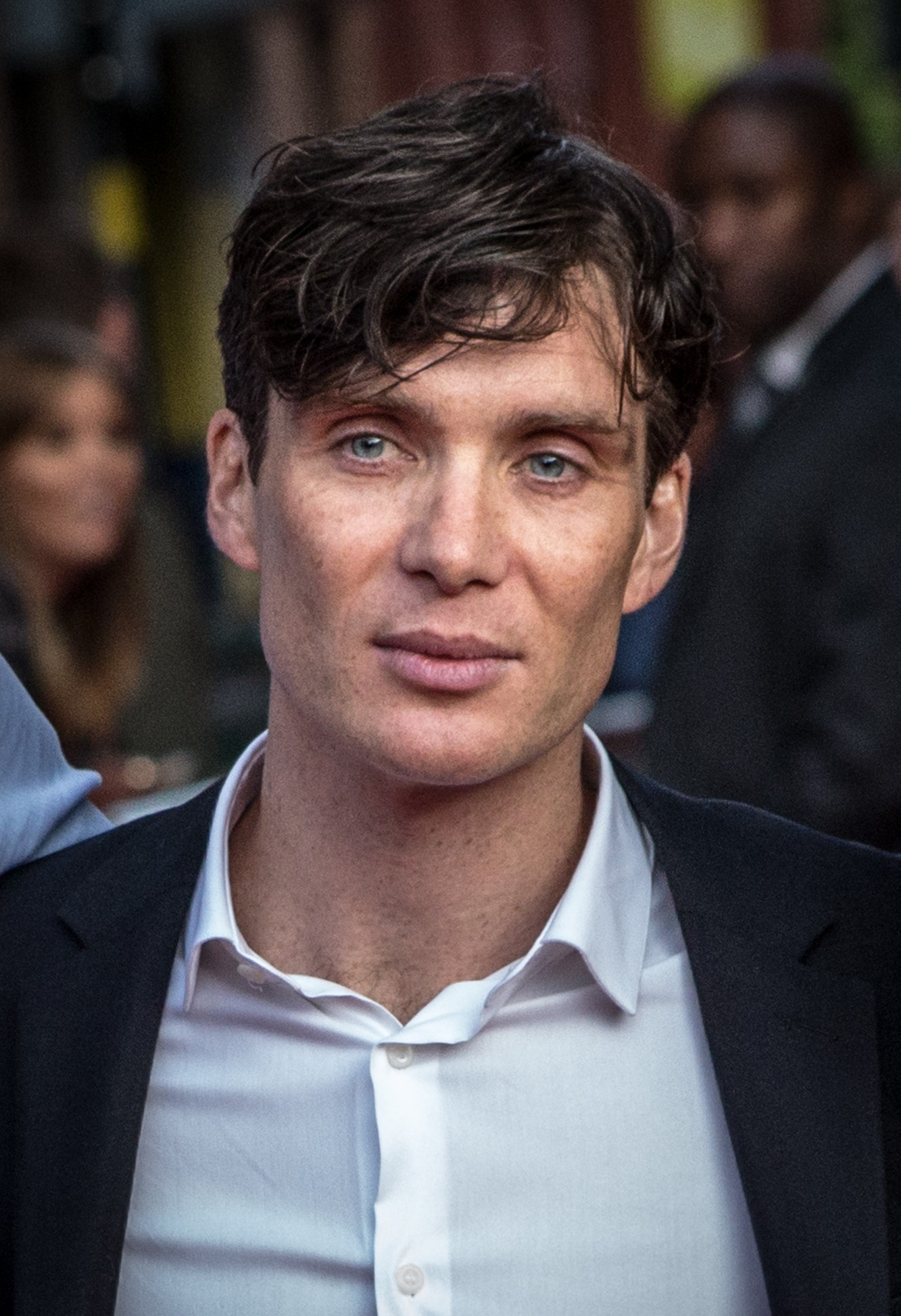
Cillian Murphy won for Oppenheimer (2023)

Adrien Brody won for The Brutalist (2024)

=== 1940s ===
Year	Actor	Role(s)	Film	Ref.
1943	Paul Lukas	Kurt Muller	Watch on the Rhine	
1944	Alexander Knox	Woodrow Wilson	Wilson	
1945	Ray Milland	Don Birnam	The Lost Weekend	
1946	Gregory Peck	Penny Baxter	The Yearling	
1947	Ronald Colman	Anthony John	A Double Life	
1948	Laurence Olivier	Hamlet, Prince of Denmark	Hamlet	
1949	Broderick Crawford	Willie Stark	All the King's Men	
1949	Richard Todd	Cpl. Lachlan "Lachie" MacLachlan	The Hasty Heart	

=== 1950s ===
Year	Actor	Role(s)	Film	Ref.
1950	José Ferrer	Cyrano de Bergerac	Cyrano de Bergerac	
1950	Louis Calhern	Oliver Wendell Holmes	The Magnificent Yankee	
1950	James Stewart	Elwood P. Dowd	Harvey	
1951	Fredric March	Willy Loman	Death of a Salesman	
1951	Kirk Douglas	Det. James McLeod	Detective Story	
1951	Arthur Kennedy	Larry Nevins	Bright Victory	
1952	Gary Cooper	Marshal Will Kane	High Noon	
1952	Ray Milland	Allan Fields	The Thief	
1952	Charles Boyer	Jacques Bonnard	The Happy Time	
1953	Spencer Tracy	Clinton Jones	The Actress	
1954	Marlon Brando	Terry Malloy	On the Waterfront	
1955	Ernest Borgnine	Marty Piletti	Marty	
1956	Kirk Douglas	Vincent van Gogh	Lust for Life	
1956	Karl Malden	Archie Lee Meighan	Baby Doll	
1956	Gary Cooper	Jess Birdwell	Friendly Persuasion	
1956	Burt Lancaster	Bill Starbuck	The Rainmaker	
1956	Charlton Heston	Moses	The Ten Commandments	
1957	Alec Guinness	Colonel Nicholson	The Bridge on the River Kwai	
1957	Marlon Brando	Maj. Lloyd "Ace" Gruver	Sayonara	
1957	Henry Fonda	Juror #8	12 Angry Men	
1957	Anthony Franciosa	Polo Pope	A Hatful of Rain	
1957	Charles Laughton	Sir Wilfrid Robarts	Witness for the Prosecution	
1958	David Niven	Major Pollock	Separate Tables	
1958	Tony Curtis	John "Joker" Jackson	The Defiant Ones	
1958	Robert Donat	The Mandarin of Yang Cheng	The Inn of the Sixth Happiness	
1958	Sidney Poitier	Noah Cullen	The Defiant Ones	
1958	Spencer Tracy	Santiago (The Old Man)	The Old Man and the Sea	
1959	Anthony Franciosa	Sam Lawson	Career	
1959	Richard Burton	Jimmy Porter	Look Back in Anger	
1959	Charlton Heston	Judah Ben-Hur	Ben-Hur	
1959	Fredric March	Jerry Kingsley	Middle of the Night	
1959	Joseph Schildkraut	Otto Frank	The Diary of Anne Frank	

=== 1960s ===
Year	Actor	Role(s)	Film	Ref.
1960	Burt Lancaster	Elmer Gantry	Elmer Gantry	
1960	Trevor Howard	Walter Morel	Sons and Lovers	
1960	Laurence Olivier	Crassus	Spartacus	
1960	Dean Stockwell	Paul Morel	Sons and Lovers	
1960	Spencer Tracy	Henry Drummond	Inherit the Wind	
1961	Maximilian Schell	Hans Rolfe	Judgment at Nuremberg	
1961	Warren Beatty	Bud Stamper	Splendor in the Grass	
1961	Maurice Chevalier	Pannisse	Fanny	
1961	Paul Newman	Fast Eddie Felson	The Hustler	
1961	Sidney Poitier	Walter Lee Younger	A Raisin in the Sun	
1962	Gregory Peck	Atticus Finch	To Kill a Mockingbird	
1962	Laurence Harvey	Wilhelm Grimm/The Cobbler	The Wonderful World of the Brothers Grimm	
1962	Burt Lancaster	Robert Franklin Stroud	Birdman of Alcatraz	
1962	Jack Lemmon	Joe Clay	Days of Wine and Roses	
1962	James Mason	Humbert Humbert	Lolita	
1962	Paul Newman	Chance Wayne	Sweet Bird of Youth	
1962	Peter O'Toole	T. E. Lawrence	Lawrence of Arabia	
1962	Anthony Quinn	Auda ibu Tayi	Lawrence of Arabia	
1963	Sidney Poitier	Homer Smith	Lilies of the Field	
1963	Marlon Brando	Harrison Carter MacWhite	The Ugly American	
1963	Stathis Giallelis	Stavros Topouzoglou	America America	
1963	Rex Harrison	Julius Caesar	Cleopatra	
1963	Steve McQueen	Rocky Papasano	Love with the Proper Stranger	
1963	Paul Newman	Hud Bannon	Hud	
1963	Gregory Peck	Captain Josiah Newman	Captain Newman, M.D.	
1963	Tom Tryon	Stephen Fermoyle	The Cardinal	
1964	Peter O'Toole	King Henry II	Becket	
1964	Richard Burton	Thomas Becket	Becket	
1964	Anthony Franciosa	Juan Luis Rodriguez	Rio Conchos	
1964	Fredric March	President Lyman	Seven Days in May	
1964	Anthony Quinn	Alexis Zorba	Zorba the Greek	
1965	Omar Sharif	Yuri Zhivago	Doctor Zhivago	
1965	Rex Harrison	Pope Julius II	The Agony and the Ecstasy	
1965	Sidney Poitier	Gordon Ralfe	A Patch of Blue	
1965	Rod Steiger	Sol Nazerman	The Pawnbroker	
1965	Oskar Werner	Willie Schumann	Ship of Fools	
1966	Paul Scofield	Sir Thomas More	A Man for All Seasons	
1966	Richard Burton	George	Who's Afraid of Virginia Woolf?	
1966	Michael Caine	Alfie	Alfie	
1966	Steve McQueen	Machinist's Mate 1st Class Jake Holman	The Sand Pebbles	
1966	Max von Sydow	Reverend Abner Hale	Hawaii	
1967	Rod Steiger	Police Chief Bill Gillespie	In the Heat of the Night	
1967	Alan Bates	Gabriel Oak	Far from the Madding Crowd	
1967	Warren Beatty	Clyde Barrow	Bonnie and Clyde	
1967	Paul Newman	Lucas "Luke" Jackson	Cool Hand Luke	
1967	Sidney Poitier	Detective Virgil Tibbs	In the Heat of the Night	
1967	Spencer Tracy	Matt Drayton	Guess Who's Coming to Dinner	
1968	Peter O'Toole	King Henry II	The Lion in Winter	
1968	Alan Arkin	John Singer	The Heart Is a Lonely Hunter	
1968	Alan Bates	Yakov Bok	The Fixer	
1968	Tony Curtis	Albert DeSalvo	The Boston Strangler	
1968	Cliff Robertson	Charlie Gordon	Charly	
1969	John Wayne	Rooster Cogburn	True Grit	
1969	Alan Arkin	Abraham "Popi" Rodriguez	Popi	
1969	Richard Burton	King Henry VIII	Anne of the Thousand Days	
1969	Dustin Hoffman	Enrico "Ratso" Rizzo	Midnight Cowboy	
1969	Jon Voight	Joe Buck	Midnight Cowboy	

=== 1970s ===
Year	Actor	Role(s)	Film	Ref.
1970	George C. Scott	George S. Patton	Patton	
1970	Melvyn Douglas	Tom Garrison	I Never Sang for My Father	
1970	James Earl Jones	Jack Jefferson	The Great White Hope	
1970	Jack Nicholson	Robert Eroica Dupea	Five Easy Pieces	
1970	Ryan O'Neal	Oliver Barret IV	Love Story	
1971	Gene Hackman	Detective Jimmy "Popeye" Doyle	The French Connection	
1971	Peter Finch	Daniel Hirsh	Sunday Bloody Sunday	
1971	Malcolm McDowell	Alex DeLarge	A Clockwork Orange	
1971	Jack Nicholson	Jonathan Fuerst	Carnal Knowledge	
1971	George C. Scott	Dr. Herbert Bock	The Hospital	
1972	Marlon Brando	Vito Corleone	The Godfather	
1972	Michael Caine	Milo Tindle	Sleuth	
1972	Laurence Olivier	Andrew Wyke	Sleuth	
1972	Al Pacino	Michael Corleone	The Godfather	
1972	Jon Voight	Ed Gentry	Deliverance	
1973	Al Pacino	Frank Serpico	Serpico	
1973	Robert Blake	John Wintergreen	Electra Glide in Blue	
1973	Jack Lemmon	Harry Stoner	Save the Tiger	
1973	Steve McQueen	Henri "Papillon" Charrière	Papillon	
1973	Jack Nicholson	Signalman 1st Class Billy L. "Badass" Buddusky	The Last Detail	
1974	Jack Nicholson	J. J. "Jake" Gittes	Chinatown	
1974	James Caan	Axel Freed	The Gambler	
1974	Gene Hackman	Harry Caul	The Conversation	
1974	Dustin Hoffman	Lenny Bruce	Lenny	
1974	Al Pacino	Michael Corleone	The Godfather Part II	
1975	Jack Nicholson	Randle Patrick "Mac" McMurphy	One Flew Over the Cuckoo's Nest	
1975	Gene Hackman	Detective Jimmy "Popeye" Doyle	French Connection II	
1975	Al Pacino	Sonny Wortzik	Dog Day Afternoon	
1975	Maximilian Schell	Arthur Goldman	The Man in the Glass Booth	
1975	James Whitmore	Harry S. Truman	Give 'em Hell, Harry!	
1976	Peter Finch (posthumous)	Howard Beale	Network	
1976	David Carradine	Woody Guthrie	Bound for Glory	
1976	Robert De Niro	Travis Bickle	Taxi Driver	
1976	Dustin Hoffman	"Babe" Levy	Marathon Man	
1976	Sylvester Stallone	Rocky Balboa	Rocky	
1977	Richard Burton	Dr. Martin Dysart	Equus	
1977	Marcello Mastroianni	Gabriele	A Special Day	
1977	Al Pacino	Bobby Deerfield	Bobby Deerfield	
1977	Gregory Peck	Douglas MacArthur	MacArthur	
1977	Henry Winkler	Jack Dunne	Heroes	
1978	Jon Voight	Luke Martin	Coming Home	
1978	Brad Davis	Billy Hayes	Midnight Express	
1978	Robert De Niro	Michael Vronsky	The Deer Hunter	
1978	Anthony Hopkins	Corky Withers / "Fats"	Magic	
1978	Gregory Peck	Dr. Josef Mengele	The Boys from Brazil	
1979	Dustin Hoffman	Ted Kramer	Kramer vs. Kramer	
1979	Jack Lemmon	Jack Godell	The China Syndrome	
1979	Al Pacino	Arthur Kirkland	...And Justice for All	
1979	Jon Voight	Billy Flynn	The Champ	
1979	James Woods	Gregory Powell	The Onion Field	

=== 1980s ===
Year	Actor	Role(s)	Film	Ref.
1980	Robert De Niro	Jake LaMotta	Raging Bull	
1980	John Hurt	John Merrick	The Elephant Man	
1980	Jack Lemmon	Scottie Templeton	Tribute	
1980	Peter O'Toole	Eli Cross	The Stunt Man	
1980	Donald Sutherland	Calvin Jarrett	Ordinary People	
1981	Henry Fonda	Norman Thayer	On Golden Pond	
1981	Warren Beatty	John Reed	Reds	
1981	Timothy Hutton	Brian Moreland	Taps	
1981	Burt Lancaster	Lou Pascal	Atlantic City	
1981	Treat Williams	Daniel Ciello	Prince of the City	
1982	Ben Kingsley	Mahatma Gandhi	Gandhi	
1982	Albert Finney	George Dunlap	Shoot the Moon	
1982	Richard Gere	Zack Mayo	An Officer and a Gentleman	
1982	Jack Lemmon	Ed Horman	Missing	
1982	Paul Newman	Frank Galvin	The Verdict	
1983	Tom Courtenay	Norman	The Dresser	
1983	Robert Duvall	Mac Sledge	Tender Mercies	
1983	Tom Conti	Gowan McGland	Reuben, Reuben	
1983	Richard Farnsworth	Bill Miner	The Grey Fox	
1983	Albert Finney	Sir	The Dresser	
1983	Al Pacino	Tony Montana	Scarface	
1983	Eric Roberts	Paul Snider	Star 80	
1984	F. Murray Abraham	Antonio Salieri	Amadeus	
1984	Jeff Bridges	Starman ("Scott Hayden")	Starman	
1984	Albert Finney	Geoffrey Firmin	Under the Volcano	
1984	Tom Hulce	Wolfgang Amadeus Mozart	Amadeus	
1984	Sam Waterston	Sydney Schanberg	The Killing Fields	
1985	Jon Voight	Oscar Manheim	Runaway Train	
1985	Harrison Ford	John Book	Witness	
1985	Gene Hackman	Harry MacKenzie	Twice in a Lifetime	
1985	William Hurt	Luis Molina	Kiss of the Spider Woman	
1985	Raul Julia	Valentin Arregui	Kiss of the Spider Woman	
1986	Bob Hoskins	George	Mona Lisa	
1986	Harrison Ford	Allie Fox	The Mosquito Coast	
1986	Dexter Gordon	Dale Turner	Round Midnight	
1986	William Hurt	James Leeds	Children of a Lesser God	
1986	Jeremy Irons	Father Gabriel	The Mission	
1986	Paul Newman	Fast Eddie Felson	The Color of Money	
1987	Michael Douglas	Gordon Gekko	Wall Street	
1987	John Lone	Puyi	The Last Emperor	
1987	Jack Nicholson	Francis Phelan	Ironweed	
1987	Nick Nolte	Lee Umstetter	Weeds	
1987	Denzel Washington	Steve Biko	Cry Freedom	
1988	Dustin Hoffman	Raymond Babbitt	Rain Man	
1988	Gene Hackman	Rupert Anderson	Mississippi Burning	
1988	Tom Hulce	Dominick Luciano	Dominick and Eugene	
1988	Edward James Olmos	Jaime Escalante	Stand and Deliver	
1988	Forest Whitaker	Charlie Parker	Bird	
1989	Tom Cruise	Ron Kovic	Born on the Fourth of July	
1989	Daniel Day-Lewis	Christy Brown	My Left Foot	
1989	Jack Lemmon	Jake Tremont	Dad	
1989	Al Pacino	Frank Keller	Sea of Love	
1989	Robin Williams	John Keating	Dead Poets Society	

=== 1990s ===
Year	Actor	Role(s)	Film	Ref.
1990	Jeremy Irons	Claus von Bülow	Reversal of Fortune	
1990	Kevin Costner	Lt. John J. Dunbar / Dances with Wolves	Dances with Wolves	
1990	Richard Harris	Bull McCabe	The Field	
1990	Al Pacino	Michael Corleone	The Godfather Part III	
1990	Robin Williams	Dr. Malcolm Sayer	Awakenings	
1991	Nick Nolte	Tom Wingo	The Prince of Tides	
1991	Warren Beatty	Bugsy Siegel	Bugsy	
1991	Kevin Costner	Jim Garrison	JFK	
1991	Robert De Niro	Max Cady	Cape Fear	
1991	Anthony Hopkins	Dr. Hannibal Lecter	The Silence of the Lambs	
1992	Al Pacino	Lieutenant Colonel Frank Slade	Scent of a Woman	
1992	Tom Cruise	Lt. Daniel Kaffee, USN, JAG Corps	A Few Good Men	
1992	Robert Downey Jr.	Charlie Chaplin	Chaplin	
1992	Jack Nicholson	Jimmy Hoffa	Hoffa	
1992	Denzel Washington	Malcolm X	Malcolm X	
1993	Tom Hanks	Andrew Beckett	Philadelphia	
1993	Daniel Day-Lewis	Gerry Conlon	In the Name of the Father	
1993	Harrison Ford	Dr. Richard Kimble	The Fugitive	
1993	Anthony Hopkins	James Stevens	The Remains of the Day	
1993	Liam Neeson	Oskar Schindler	Schindler's List	
1994	Tom Hanks	Forrest Gump	Forrest Gump	
1994	Morgan Freeman	Ellis Boyd "Red" Redding	The Shawshank Redemption	
1994	Paul Newman	Donald "Sully" Sullivan	Nobody's Fool	
1994	Brad Pitt	Tristan Ludlow	Legends of the Fall	
1994	John Travolta	Vincent Vega	Pulp Fiction	
1995	Nicolas Cage	Ben Sanderson	Leaving Las Vegas	
1995	Richard Dreyfuss	Glenn Holland	Mr. Holland's Opus	
1995	Anthony Hopkins	Richard Nixon	Nixon	
1995	Ian McKellen	King Richard III	Richard III	
1995	Sean Penn	Matthew Poncelet	Dead Man Walking	
1996	Geoffrey Rush	David Helfgott	Shine	
1996	Ralph Fiennes	László de Almásy	The English Patient	
1996	Mel Gibson	Tom Mullen	Ransom	
1996	Woody Harrelson	Larry Flynt	The People vs. Larry Flynt	
1996	Liam Neeson	Michael Collins	Michael Collins	
1997	Peter Fonda	Ulee Jackson	Ulee's Gold	
1997	Matt Damon	Will Hunting	Good Will Hunting	
1997	Daniel Day-Lewis	Danny Flynn	The Boxer	
1997	Leonardo DiCaprio	Jack Dawson	Titanic	
1997	Djimon Hounsou	Joseph Cinqué	Amistad	
1998	Jim Carrey	Truman Burbank	The Truman Show	
1998	Stephen Fry	Oscar Wilde	Wilde	
1998	Tom Hanks	Captain John H. Miller	Saving Private Ryan	
1998	Ian McKellen	James Whale	Gods and Monsters	
1998	Nick Nolte	Wade Whitehouse	Affliction	
1999	Denzel Washington	Rubin "Hurricane" Carter	The Hurricane	
1999	Russell Crowe	Jeffrey Wigand	The Insider	
1999	Matt Damon	Tom Ripley	The Talented Mr. Ripley	
1999	Richard Farnsworth	Alvin Straight	The Straight Story	
1999	Kevin Spacey	Lester Burnham	American Beauty	

=== 2000s ===
Year	Actor	Role(s)	Film	Ref.
2000	Tom Hanks	Chuck Noland	Cast Away	
2000	Javier Bardem	Reinaldo Arenas	Before Night Falls	
2000	Russell Crowe	Maximus Decimus Meridius	Gladiator	
2000	Michael Douglas	Grady Tripp	Wonder Boys	
2000	Geoffrey Rush	Marquis de Sade	Quills	
2001	Russell Crowe	John Nash	A Beautiful Mind	
2001	Will Smith	Muhammad Ali	Ali	
2001	Kevin Spacey	Quoyle	The Shipping News	
2001	Billy Bob Thornton	Ed Crane	The Man Who Wasn't There	
2001	Denzel Washington	Detective Alonzo Harris	Training Day	
2002	Jack Nicholson	Warren R. Schmidt	About Schmidt	
2002	Adrien Brody	Władysław Szpilman	The Pianist	
2002	Michael Caine	Thomas Fowler	The Quiet American	
2002	Daniel Day-Lewis	William "Bill the Butcher" Cutting	Gangs of New York	
2002	Leonardo DiCaprio	Frank Abagnale Jr.	Catch Me If You Can	
2003	Sean Penn	Jimmy Markum	Mystic River	
2003	Russell Crowe	Captain Jack Aubrey	Master and Commander: The Far Side of the World	
2003	Tom Cruise	Captain Nathan Algren	The Last Samurai	
2003	Ben Kingsley	Massoud Behrani	House of Sand and Fog	
2003	Jude Law	W. P. Inman	Cold Mountain	
2004	Leonardo DiCaprio	Howard Hughes	The Aviator	
2004	Javier Bardem	Ramón Sampedro	The Sea Inside	
2004	Don Cheadle	Paul Rusesabagina	Hotel Rwanda	
2004	Johnny Depp	J. M. Barrie	Finding Neverland	
2004	Liam Neeson	Alfred Kinsey	Kinsey	
2005	Philip Seymour Hoffman	Truman Capote	Capote	
2005	Russell Crowe	James J. Braddock	Cinderella Man	
2005	Terrence Howard	DJay	Hustle & Flow	
2005	Heath Ledger	Ennis Del Mar	Brokeback Mountain	
2005	David Strathairn	Edward R. Murrow	Good Night, and Good Luck	
2006	Forest Whitaker	Idi Amin	The Last King of Scotland	
2006	Leonardo DiCaprio	Danny Archer	Blood Diamond	
2006	Leonardo DiCaprio	William "Billy" Costigan Jr.	The Departed	
2006	Peter O'Toole	Maurice Russell	Venus	
2006	Will Smith	Chris Gardner	The Pursuit of Happyness	
2007	Daniel Day-Lewis	Daniel Plainview	There Will Be Blood	
2007	George Clooney	Michael Clayton	Michael Clayton	
2007	James McAvoy	Robbie Turner	Atonement	
2007	Viggo Mortensen	Nikolai Luzhin	Eastern Promises	
2007	Denzel Washington	Frank Lucas	American Gangster	
2008	Mickey Rourke	Randy "The Ram" Robinson	The Wrestler	
2008	Leonardo DiCaprio	Frank Wheeler	Revolutionary Road	
2008	Frank Langella	Richard Nixon	Frost/Nixon	
2008	Sean Penn	Harvey Milk	Milk	
2008	Brad Pitt	Benjamin Button	The Curious Case of Benjamin Button	
2009	Jeff Bridges	Otis "Bad" Blake	Crazy Heart	
2009	George Clooney	Ryan Bingham	Up in the Air	
2009	Colin Firth	George Falconer	A Single Man	
2009	Morgan Freeman	Nelson Mandela	Invictus	
2009	Tobey Maguire	Captain Sam Cahill	Brothers	

=== 2010s ===
Year	Actor	Role(s)	Film	Ref.
2010	Colin Firth	King George VI	The King's Speech	
2010	Jesse Eisenberg	Mark Zuckerberg	The Social Network	
2010	James Franco	Aron Ralston	127 Hours	
2010	Ryan Gosling	Dean Pereira	Blue Valentine	
2010	Mark Wahlberg	Micky Ward	The Fighter	
2011	George Clooney	Matt King	The Descendants	
2011	Leonardo DiCaprio	J. Edgar Hoover	J. Edgar	
2011	Michael Fassbender	Brandon Sullivan	Shame	
2011	Ryan Gosling	Stephen Meyers	The Ides of March	
2011	Brad Pitt	Billy Beane	Moneyball	
2012	Daniel Day-Lewis	Abraham Lincoln	Lincoln	
2012	Richard Gere	Robert Miller	Arbitrage	
2012	John Hawkes	Mark O'Brien	The Sessions	
2012	Joaquin Phoenix	Freddie Quell	The Master	
2012	Denzel Washington	William "Whip" Whitaker Sr.	Flight	
2013	Matthew McConaughey	Ron Woodroof	Dallas Buyers Club	
2013	Chiwetel Ejiofor	Solomon Northup	12 Years a Slave	
2013	Idris Elba	Nelson Mandela	Mandela: Long Walk to Freedom	
2013	Tom Hanks	Captain Richard Phillips	Captain Phillips	
2013	Robert Redford	Our Man	All Is Lost	
2014	Eddie Redmayne	Stephen Hawking	The Theory of Everything	
2014	Steve Carell	John Eleuthère du Pont	Foxcatcher	
2014	Benedict Cumberbatch	Alan Turing	The Imitation Game	
2014	Jake Gyllenhaal	Louis "Lou" Bloom	Nightcrawler	
2014	David Oyelowo	Martin Luther King Jr.	Selma	
2015	Leonardo DiCaprio	Hugh Glass	The Revenant	
2015	Bryan Cranston	Dalton Trumbo	Trumbo	
2015	Michael Fassbender	Steve Jobs	Steve Jobs	
2015	Eddie Redmayne	Lili Elbe	The Danish Girl	
2015	Will Smith	Dr. Bennet Omalu	Concussion	
2016	Casey Affleck	Lee Chandler	Manchester by the Sea	
2016	Joel Edgerton	Richard Loving	Loving	
2016	Andrew Garfield	Desmond T. Doss	Hacksaw Ridge	
2016	Viggo Mortensen	Ben Cash	Captain Fantastic	
2016	Denzel Washington	Troy Maxson	Fences	
2017	Gary Oldman	Winston Churchill	Darkest Hour	
2017	Timothée Chalamet	Elio Perlman	Call Me by Your Name	
2017	Daniel Day-Lewis	Reynolds Woodcock	Phantom Thread	
2017	Tom Hanks	Ben Bradlee	The Post	
2017	Denzel Washington	Roman J. Israel	Roman J. Israel, Esq.	
2018	Rami Malek	Freddie Mercury	Bohemian Rhapsody	
2018	Bradley Cooper	Jackson Maine	A Star Is Born	
2018	Willem Dafoe	Vincent van Gogh	At Eternity's Gate	
2018	Lucas Hedges	Jared Eamons	Boy Erased	
2018	John David Washington	Ron Stallworth	BlacKkKlansman	
2019	Joaquin Phoenix	Arthur Fleck / Joker	Joker	
2019	Christian Bale	Ken Miles	Ford v. Ferrari	
2019	Antonio Banderas	Salvador Mallo	Pain and Glory	
2019	Adam Driver	Charlie Barber	Marriage Story	
2019	Jonathan Pryce	Cardinal Jorge Mario Bergoglio	The Two Popes	

=== 2020s ===
Year	Actor	Role(s)	Film	Ref.
2020	Chadwick Boseman (posthumous)	Levee Green	Ma Rainey's Black Bottom	
2020	Riz Ahmed	Ruben Stone	Sound of Metal	
2020	Anthony Hopkins	Anthony	The Father	
2020	Gary Oldman	Herman J. Mankiewicz	Mank	
2020	Tahar Rahim	Mohamedou Ould Salahi	The Mauritanian	
2021	Will Smith	Richard Williams	King Richard	
2021	Mahershala Ali	Cameron Turner	Swan Song	
2021	Javier Bardem	Desi Arnaz	Being the Ricardos	
2021	Benedict Cumberbatch	Phil Burbank	The Power of the Dog	
2021	Denzel Washington	Lord Macbeth	The Tragedy of Macbeth	
2022	Austin Butler	Elvis Presley	Elvis	
2022	Brendan Fraser	Charlie	The Whale	
2022	Hugh Jackman	Peter Miller	The Son	
2022	Bill Nighy	Rodney Williams	Living	
2022	Jeremy Pope	Ellis French	The Inspection	
2023	Cillian Murphy	J. Robert Oppenheimer	Oppenheimer	
2023	Bradley Cooper	Leonard Bernstein	Maestro	
2023	Leonardo DiCaprio	Ernest Burkhart	Killers of the Flower Moon	
2023	Colman Domingo	Bayard Rustin	Rustin	
2023	Barry Keoghan	Oliver Quick	Saltburn	
2023	Andrew Scott	Adam	All of Us Strangers	
2024	Adrien Brody	László Tóth	The Brutalist	
2024	Timothée Chalamet	Bob Dylan	A Complete Unknown	
2024	Daniel Craig	William Lee	Queer	
2024	Colman Domingo	John "Divine G" Whitfield	Sing Sing	
2024	Ralph Fiennes	Thomas Cardinal Lawrence	Conclave	
2024	Sebastian Stan	Donald Trump	The Apprentice	
2025	Wagner Moura	Armando / Marcelo Alves / Fernando	The Secret Agent	
2025	Oscar Isaac	Victor Frankenstein	Frankenstein	
2025	Dwayne Johnson	Mark Kerr	The Smashing Machine	
2025	Michael B. Jordan	Elijah "Smoke" Moore / Elias "Stack" Moore	Sinners	
2025	Joel Edgerton	Robert Grainier	Train Dreams	
2025	Jeremy Allen White	Bruce Springsteen	Springsteen: Deliver Me from Nowhere	

== Multiple nominations ==
10 nominations

- Al Pacino

9 nominations

- Leonardo DiCaprio
- Denzel Washington

8 nominations

- Jack Nicholson

7 nominations

- Daniel Day-Lewis
- Paul Newman

6 nominations

- Tom Hanks
- Jack Lemmon

5 nominations

- Richard Burton
- Russell Crowe
- Gene Hackman
- Dustin Hoffman
- Anthony Hopkins
- Peter O'Toole
- Gregory Peck
- Sidney Poitier
- Jon Voight

4 nominations

- Warren Beatty
- Marlon Brando
- Robert De Niro
- Burt Lancaster
- Will Smith
- Spencer Tracy

3 nominations

- Javier Bardem
- Michael Caine
- George Clooney
- Tom Cruise
- Albert Finney
- Harrison Ford
- Fredric March
- Steve McQueen
- Liam Neeson
- Nick Nolte
- Laurence Olivier
- Sean Penn
- Brad Pitt
- George C. Scott

2 nominations

- Alan Arkin
- Alan Bates
- Jeff Bridges
- Adrien Brody
- Timothée Chalamet
- Bradley Cooper
- Gary Cooper
- Kevin Costner
- Benedict Cumberbatch
- Tony Curtis
- Matt Damon
- Colman Domingo
- Kirk Douglas
- Michael Douglas
- Joel Edgerton
- Richard Farnsworth
- Michael Fassbender
- Ralph Fiennes
- Peter Finch
- Colin Firth
- Henry Fonda
- Morgan Freeman
- Richard Gere
- Ryan Gosling
- Rex Harrison
- Charlton Heston
- Tom Hulce
- William Hurt
- Jeremy Irons
- Ben Kingsley
- Ian McKellen
- Ray Milland
- Viggo Mortensen
- Joaquin Phoenix
- Gary Oldman
- Anthony Quinn
- Eddie Redmayne
- Geoffrey Rush
- Maximilian Schell
- Kevin Spacey
- Rod Steiger
- Forest Whitaker
- Robin Williams

== Multiple wins ==
3 wins

- Tom Hanks (2 consecutive)
- Jack Nicholson (2 consecutive)

2 wins

- Marlon Brando
- Daniel Day-Lewis
- Leonardo DiCaprio
- Dustin Hoffman
- Peter O'Toole
- Al Pacino
- Gregory Peck
- Jon Voight

== Firsts ==
- José Ferrer became the first Latino as well as the first Puerto Rican actor to win in 1951.
- Sidney Poitier became the first actor of African descent as well as the first Bahamian actor to win in 1963.
- Omar Sharif became the first actor of Middle Eastern descent as well as the first Egyptian actor to win in 1966.
- Peter Finch became the first actor to win posthumously in 1977.
- Ben Kingsley became the first actor of Asian descent to win in 1983.
- Wagner Moura became the first actor to win for a foreign language/non-English language performance in 2025.

== See also ==
- Academy Award for Best Actor
- Actor Award for Outstanding Performance by a Male Actor in a Leading Role
- BAFTA Award for Best Actor in a Leading Role
- Critics' Choice Movie Award for Best Actor
- Golden Globe Award for Best Actor in a Motion Picture – Musical or Comedy
- Independent Spirit Award for Best Lead Performance
