= List of accolades received by Brokeback Mountain =

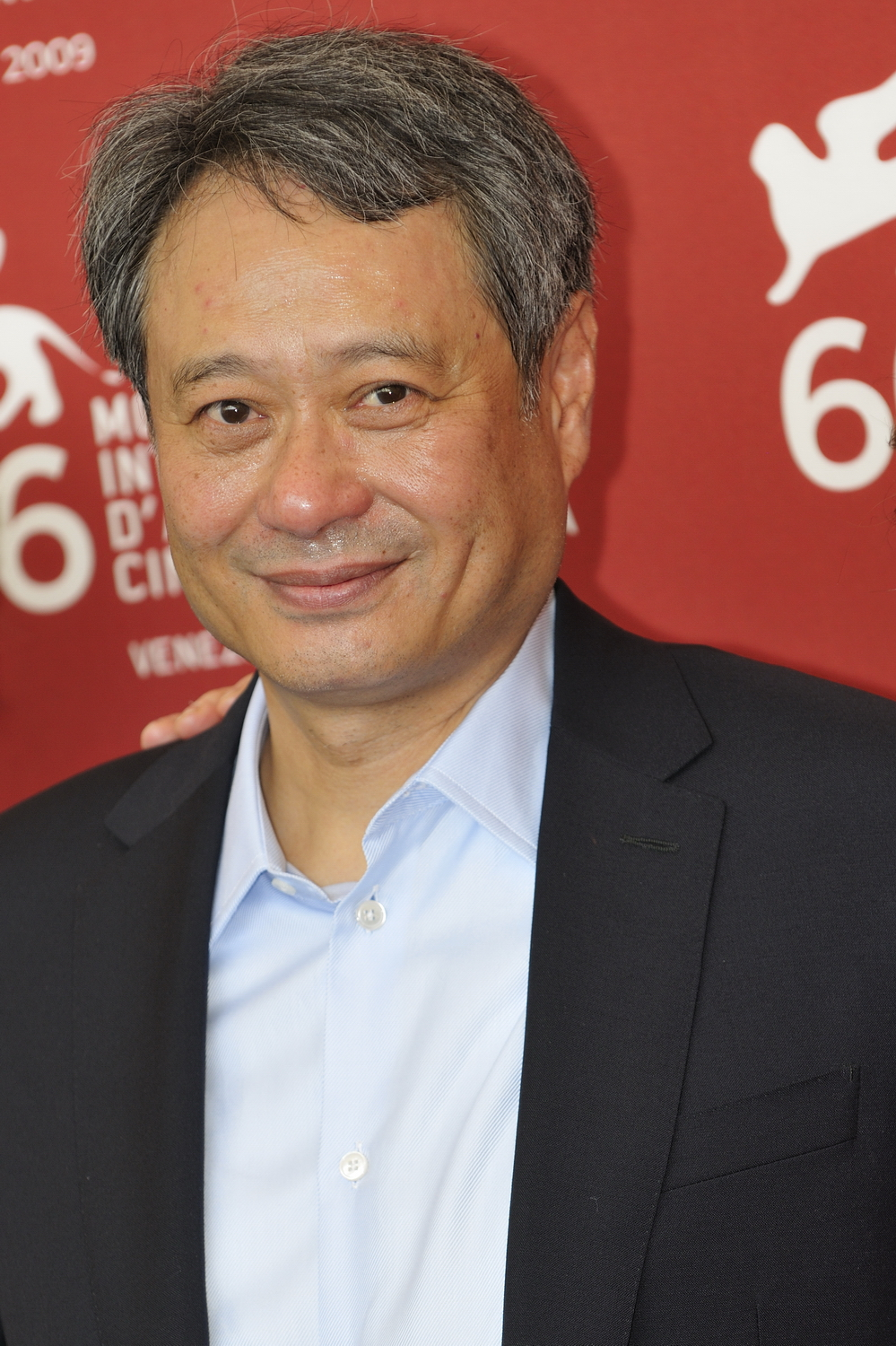
- Ang Lee received many awards for his work on the film, including the Golden Lion and the Academy Award for Best Director.
Accolades
Award	Won	Nominated
Academy Awards	3	8
African-American Film Critics Association Awards	1	1
American Cinema Editors Awards	0	1
American Film Institute	1	1
American Society of Cinematographers Awards	0	1
Artios Awards	1	1
Austin Film Critics Association Awards	2	2
Australian Film Institute Awards	1	1
British Academy Film Awards	4	9
BMI Awards	1	1
Bodil Awards	0	1
Boston Society of Film Critics Awards	4	4
Chicago Film Critics Association Awards	2	8
César Awards	0	1
Critics' Choice Movie Awards	3	8
Dallas–Fort Worth Film Critics Association Awards	7	7
David di Donatello Awards	0	1
Directors Guild of America Awards	1	1
Dublin Film Critics' Circle Awards	3	3
European Film Awards	0	1
Florida Film Critics Circle Awards	4	4}
GLAAD Media Awards	1	1
Golden Globe Awards	4	7
Golden Trailer Awards	0	1
Grammy Awards	0	1
Hollywood Film Awards	2	2
Independent Spirit Awards	2	4
London Film Critics Circle Awards	2	4
Los Angeles Film Critics Association Awards	3	3
MTV Movie Awards	2	2
National Board of Review	3	3
National Society of Film Critics Awards	1	1
New York Film Critics Circle Awards	3	3
New York Film Critics Online Awards	1	1
Nikkan Sports Film Awards	1	1
Online Film Critics Society Awards	2	8
Producers Guild of America Awards	1	1
San Diego Film Critics Society Awards	1	1
San Francisco Film Critics Circle Awards	3	3
Santa Barbara International Film Festival	1	1
Satellite Awards	4	8
Screen Actors Guild Awards	0	4
St. Louis Gateway Film Critics Association Awards	4	4
USC Scripter Awards	1	1
Vancouver Film Critics Circle Awards	2	2
Venice International Film Festival	1	1
Washington D.C. Area Film Critics Association Awards	0	5
World Soundtrack Awards	1	3
Writers Guild of America Awards	1	1
- Total number of awards and nominations (Note: Certain award groups do not simply award one winner. They recognize several different recipients and have runners-up. Since this is a specific recognition and is different from losing an award, runner-up mentions are considered wins in this award tally.)
Totals	85	137
- Footnotes

Brokeback Mountain is a 2005 American romantic drama film directed by Ang Lee. Based on the short story of the same name by author Annie Proulx, the story was adapted by Larry McMurtry and Diana Ossana. The film depicts the complex emotional and sexual relationship between two men, Ennis Del Mar (Heath Ledger) and Jack Twist (Jake Gyllenhaal) in the American West between 1963 and 1983. Michelle Williams, Anne Hathaway, Linda Cardellini, Randy Quaid, Anna Faris, and Kate Mara appear in supporting roles.

Brokeback Mountain premiered at the Venice International Film Festival, where it won the Golden Lion. Focus Features gave the film a limited release on December 9, 2005, before going wide on January 13, 2006. The film grossed $178 million worldwide on a production budget of $14 million. Rotten Tomatoes surveyed 234 reviews and judged 87% of them to be positive.

Brokeback Mountain garnered awards and nominations in various categories for its directing, script, acting, score, and cinematography. At the 78th Academy Awards, Brokeback Mountain was nominated for the Academy Award for Best Picture and won three: Best Director, Best Adapted Screenplay, and Original Score. The film garnered seven nominations at the 63rd Golden Globe Awards, winning four for Best Motion Picture – Drama, Best Director, Best Screenplay and Best Song. At the 59th British Academy Film Awards, Brokeback Mountain was nominated for nine awards, winning in the categories of Best Film, Best Direction, Best Adapted Screenplay and Best Supporting Actor for Jake Gyllenhaal. The film also received prizes at various guilds: it won the Producers Guild of America Award for Best Theatrical Motion Picture, the Directors Guild of America Award for Outstanding Directing – Feature Film, and the Writers Guild of America Award for Best Adapted Screenplay. In addition, it garnered four Screen Actors Guild nominations for Best Actor, Best Supporting Actor, Best Supporting Actress and Best Cast, more than any other film; however, it did not win any of these awards.

After Brokeback Mountain lost the Academy Award for Best Picture to Crash, many accused the academy of homophobia and for making a non-groundbreaking choice, and commentators including Kenneth Turan and Nikki Finke derided the academy's decision. However, supporters of Crash, such as critic Roger Ebert, argued that claims of bias were unjustified and that the better film won. In 2015, The Hollywood Reporter polled hundreds of academy members, asking them to re-vote on past controversial decisions. In the poll, Brokeback Mountain won the re-vote for Best Picture.

== Accolades ==
Award	Date of ceremony	Category	Recipient(s) and nominee(s)	Result	Ref.
Academy Awards	March 5, 2006	Best Picture	Diana Ossana and James Schamus	Nominated	
Academy Awards	March 5, 2006	Best Director	Ang Lee	Won	
Academy Awards	March 5, 2006	Best Actor	Heath Ledger	Nominated	
Academy Awards	March 5, 2006	Best Supporting Actor	Jake Gyllenhaal	Nominated	
Academy Awards	March 5, 2006	Best Supporting Actress	Michelle Williams	Nominated	
Academy Awards	March 5, 2006	Best Adapted Screenplay	Larry McMurtry and Diana Ossana	Won	
Academy Awards	March 5, 2006	Best Cinematography	Rodrigo Prieto	Nominated	
Academy Awards	March 5, 2006	Best Original Score	Gustavo Santaolalla	Won	
African-American Film Critics Association	December 30, 2005	Top Ten Films	Brokeback Mountain	Won	
American Cinema Editors	February 19, 2006	Best Edited Feature Film – Dramatic	Geraldine Peroni and Dylan Tichenor	Nominated	
American Film Institute	N/A	Top Ten Films	Brokeback Mountain	Won	
American Society of Cinematographers	February 26, 2006	Outstanding Achievement in Cinematography in Theatrical Releases	Rodrigo Prieto	Nominated	
Austin Film Critics Association	January 2, 2006	Top Ten Films	Brokeback Mountain	Won	
Austin Film Critics Association	January 2, 2006	Best Adapted Screenplay	Larry McMurtry and Diana Ossana	Won	
Australian Film Institute Awards	December 5–6, 2006	International Award for Best Actor	Heath Ledger	Won	
British Academy Film Awards	February 19, 2006	Best Film	Diana Ossana and James Schamus	Won	
British Academy Film Awards	February 19, 2006	Best Direction	Ang Lee	Won	
British Academy Film Awards	February 19, 2006	Best Actor in a Leading Role	Heath Ledger	Nominated	
British Academy Film Awards	February 19, 2006	Best Actor in a Supporting Role	Jake Gyllenhaal	Won	
British Academy Film Awards	February 19, 2006	Best Actress in a Supporting Role	Michelle Williams	Nominated	
British Academy Film Awards	February 19, 2006	Best Adapted Screenplay	Larry McMurtry and Diana Ossana	Won	
British Academy Film Awards	February 19, 2006	Best Cinematography	Rodrigo Prieto	Nominated	
British Academy Film Awards	February 19, 2006	Best Editing	Geraldine Peroni and Dylan Tichenor	Nominated	
British Academy Film Awards	February 19, 2006	Best Film Music	Gustavo Santaolalla	Nominated	
BMI Awards	May 17, 2006	Film Music Award	Gustavo Santaolalla	Won	
Bodil Awards	March 5, 2006	Best American Film	Brokeback Mountain	Nominated	
Boston Society of Film Critics	December 11, 2005	Best Film	Brokeback Mountain	Won	
Boston Society of Film Critics	December 11, 2005	Best Director	Ang Lee	Won	
Boston Society of Film Critics	December 11, 2005	Best Actor	Heath Ledger	2nd Place	
Boston Society of Film Critics	December 11, 2005	Best Cinematography	Rodrigo Prieto	2nd Place	
Casting Society of America	November 1, 2006	Best Feature Film Casting – Drama	Avy Kaufman	Won	
Chicago Film Critics Association	January 9, 2006	Best Film	Brokeback Mountain	Nominated	
Chicago Film Critics Association	January 9, 2006	Best Director	Ang Lee	Nominated	
Chicago Film Critics Association	January 9, 2006	Best Actor	Heath Ledger	Nominated	
Chicago Film Critics Association	January 9, 2006	Best Supporting Actor	Jake Gyllenhaal	Nominated	
Chicago Film Critics Association	January 9, 2006	Best Supporting Actress	Michelle Williams	Nominated	
Chicago Film Critics Association	January 9, 2006	Best Screenplay	Larry McMurtry and Diana Ossana	Nominated	
Chicago Film Critics Association	January 9, 2006	Best Original Score	Gustavo Santaolalla	Won	
Chicago Film Critics Association	January 9, 2006	Best Cinematography	Rodrigo Prieto	Won	
César Awards	February 26, 2007	Best Foreign Film	Brokeback Mountain	Nominated	
Critics' Choice Movie Awards	January 9, 2006	Best Picture	Brokeback Mountain	Won	
Critics' Choice Movie Awards	January 9, 2006	Best Director	Ang Lee	Won	
Critics' Choice Movie Awards	January 9, 2006	Best Actor	Heath Ledger	Nominated	
Critics' Choice Movie Awards	January 9, 2006	Best Supporting Actor	Jake Gyllenhaal	Nominated	
Critics' Choice Movie Awards	January 9, 2006	Best Supporting Actress	Michelle Williams	Won (Note: Tied with Amy Adams for Junebug)	
Critics' Choice Movie Awards	January 9, 2006	Best Screenplay	Larry McMurtry and Diana Ossana	Nominated	
Critics' Choice Movie Awards	January 9, 2006	Best Composer	Gustavo Santaolalla	Nominated	
Critics' Choice Movie Awards	January 9, 2006	Best Song	"A Love That Will Never Grow Old" (Emmylou Harris)	Nominated	
Dallas–Fort Worth Film Critics Association	January 4, 2006	Best Film	Brokeback Mountain	Won	
Dallas–Fort Worth Film Critics Association	January 4, 2006	Best Director	Ang Lee	Won	
Dallas–Fort Worth Film Critics Association	January 4, 2006	Best Actor	Heath Ledger	2nd Place	
Dallas–Fort Worth Film Critics Association	January 4, 2006	Best Supporting Actor	Jake Gyllenhaal	3rd Place	
Dallas–Fort Worth Film Critics Association	January 4, 2006	Best Supporting Actress	Michelle Williams	2nd Place	
Dallas–Fort Worth Film Critics Association	January 4, 2006	Best Screenplay	Larry McMurtry and Diana Ossana	Won	
Dallas–Fort Worth Film Critics Association	January 4, 2006	Best Cinematography	Rodrigo Prieto	Won	
David di Donatello	April 21, 2006	Best Foreign Film	Ang Lee	Nominated	
Directors Guild of America Awards	January 28, 2006	Outstanding Directing – Feature Film	Ang Lee	Won	
Dublin Film Critics' Circle	January 2, 2006	Best Film	Brokeback Mountain	Won	
Dublin Film Critics' Circle	January 2, 2006	Best Director	Ang Lee	3rd Place	
Dublin Film Critics' Circle	January 2, 2006	Best Actor	Heath Ledger	2nd Place	
European Film Awards	December 11, 2005	Screen International Award	Ang Lee	Nominated	
Florida Film Critics Circle	December 24, 2005	Best Film	Brokeback Mountain	Won	
Florida Film Critics Circle	December 24, 2005	Best Director	Ang Lee	Won	
Florida Film Critics Circle	December 24, 2005	Best Screenplay	Larry McMurtry and Diana Ossana	Won	
Florida Film Critics Circle	December 24, 2005	Best Cinematography	Rodrigo Prieto	Won	
GLAAD Media Awards	March 27, 2006	Outstanding Film – Wide Release	Brokeback Mountain	Won	
Golden Globe Awards	January 16, 2006	Best Motion Picture – Drama	Brokeback Mountain	Won	
Golden Globe Awards	January 16, 2006	Best Director	Ang Lee	Won	
Golden Globe Awards	January 16, 2006	Best Actor – Motion Picture Drama	Heath Ledger	Nominated	
Golden Globe Awards	January 16, 2006	Best Supporting Actress – Motion Picture	Michelle Williams	Nominated	
Golden Globe Awards	January 16, 2006	Best Screenplay	Larry McMurtry and Diana Ossana	Won	
Golden Globe Awards	January 16, 2006	Best Original Score	Gustavo Santaolalla	Nominated	
Golden Globe Awards	January 16, 2006	Best Original Song	"A Love That Will Never Grow Old" (Gustavo Santaolalla, Bernie Taupin, and Emmylou Harris)	Won	
Golden Trailer Awards	June 1, 2006	Best Romance	Brokeback Mountain	Nominated	
Gotham Awards	November 30, 2005	Best Feature	Brokeback Mountain	Nominated	
Gotham Awards	November 30, 2005	Best Ensemble Cast	Linda Cardellini, Anna Faris, Jake Gyllenhaal, Anne Hathaway, Heath Ledger, Randy Quaid, and Michelle Williams	Nominated	
Grammy Awards	February 11, 2007	Best Compilation Soundtrack for Visual Media	Gustavo Santaolalla	Nominated	
Hollywood Film Awards	October 24, 2005	Best Breakthrough Actor	Jake Gyllenhaal (also for Jarhead and Proof)	Won	
Hollywood Film Awards	October 24, 2005	Hollywood Casting Director Award	Avy Kaufman	Won	
Independent Spirit Awards	March 4, 2006	Best Film	James Schamus and Diana Ossana	Won	
Independent Spirit Awards	March 4, 2006	Best Director	Ang Lee	Won	
Independent Spirit Awards	March 4, 2006	Best Male Lead	Heath Ledger	Nominated	
Independent Spirit Awards	March 4, 2006	Best Supporting Female	Michelle Williams	Nominated	
London Film Critics Circle	February 8, 2006	Film of the Year	Brokeback Mountain	Won	
London Film Critics Circle	February 8, 2006	Director of the Year	Ang Lee	Won	
London Film Critics Circle	February 8, 2006	Actor of the Year	Heath Ledger	Nominated	
London Film Critics Circle	February 8, 2006	Screenwriter of the Year	Larry McMurtry and Diana Ossana	Nominated	
Los Angeles Film Critics Association	January 13, 2006	Best Film	Brokeback Mountain	Won	
Los Angeles Film Critics Association	January 13, 2006	Best Director	Ang Lee	Won	
Los Angeles Film Critics Association	January 13, 2006	Best Actor	Heath Ledger	2nd Place	
MTV Movie Awards	June 3, 2006	Best Performance	Jake Gyllenhaal	Won	
MTV Movie Awards	June 3, 2006	Best Kiss	Jake Gyllenhaal and Heath Ledger	Won	
National Board of Review	January 10, 2006	Top Ten Films	Brokeback Mountain	Won	
National Board of Review	January 10, 2006	Best Director	Ang Lee	Won	
National Board of Review	January 10, 2006	Best Supporting Actor	Jake Gyllenhaal	Won	
National Society of Film Critics	January 7, 2006	Best Actor	Heath Ledger	3rd Place	
New York Film Critics Circle	December 12, 2005	Best Film	Brokeback Mountain	Won	
New York Film Critics Circle	December 12, 2005	Best Director	Ang Lee	Won	
New York Film Critics Circle	December 12, 2005	Best Actor	Heath Ledger	Won	
New York Film Critics Online	December 11, 2005	Top Films	Brokeback Mountain	Won	
Nikkan Sports Film Awards	December 28, 2006	Best Foreign Film	Ang Lee	Won	
Online Film Critics Society	January 16, 2006	Best Picture	Brokeback Mountain	Nominated	
Online Film Critics Society	January 16, 2006	Best Director	Ang Lee	Nominated	
Online Film Critics Society	January 16, 2006	Best Actor	Heath Ledger	Nominated	
Online Film Critics Society	January 16, 2006	Best Supporting Actor	Jake Gyllenhaal	Nominated	
Online Film Critics Society	January 16, 2006	Best Supporting Actress	Michelle Williams	Nominated	
Online Film Critics Society	January 16, 2006	Best Adapted Screenplay	Larry McMurtry and Diana Ossana	Won	
Online Film Critics Society	January 16, 2006	Best Original Score	Gustavo Santaolalla	Won	
Online Film Critics Society	January 16, 2006	Best Cinematography	Rodrigo Prieto	Nominated	
Producers Guild of America Awards	January 22, 2006	Best Theatrical Motion Picture	Diana Ossana and James Schamus	Won	
San Diego Film Critics Society	December 12, 2005	Body of Work award	Jake Gyllenhaal (also for Jarhead and Proof)	Won	
San Francisco Film Critics Circle	December 12, 2005	Best Film	Brokeback Mountain	Won	
San Francisco Film Critics Circle	December 12, 2005	Best Director	Ang Lee	Won	
San Francisco Film Critics Circle	December 12, 2005	Best Actor	Heath Ledger	Won	
Santa Barbara International Film Festival	February 12, 2006	Outstanding Performance Award	Heath Ledger	Won	
Satellite Awards	December 17, 2005	Best Film, Motion Picture Drama	Brokeback Mountain	Won	
Satellite Awards	December 17, 2005	Best Director	Ang Lee	Won	
Satellite Awards	December 17, 2005	Best Actor – Motion Picture Drama	Heath Ledger	Nominated	
Satellite Awards	December 17, 2005	Best Supporting Actor – Motion Picture	Jake Gyllenhaal	Nominated	
Satellite Awards	December 17, 2005	Best Adapted Screenplay	Larry McMurtry and Diana Ossana	Nominated	
Satellite Awards	December 17, 2005	Best Original Score	Gustavo Santaolalla	Nominated	
Satellite Awards	December 17, 2005	Best Original Song	"A Love That Will Never Grow Old" (Gustavo Santaolalla, Bernie Taupin, and Emmylou Harris)	Won	
Satellite Awards	December 17, 2005	Best Editing	Geraldine Peroni and Dylan Tichenor	Won	
Screen Actors Guild Awards	January 29, 2006	Outstanding Performance by a Cast in a Motion Picture	Linda Cardellini, Anna Faris, Jake Gyllenhaal, Anne Hathaway, Heath Ledger, Randy Quaid, and Michelle Williams	Nominated	
Screen Actors Guild Awards	January 29, 2006	Outstanding Performance by a Male Actor in a Leading Role	Heath Ledger	Nominated	
Screen Actors Guild Awards	January 29, 2006	Outstanding Performance by a Male Actor in a Supporting Role	Jake Gyllenhaal	Nominated	
Screen Actors Guild Awards	January 29, 2006	Outstanding Performance by a Female Actor in a Supporting Role	Michelle Williams	Nominated	
St. Louis Gateway Film Critics Association	January 8, 2006	Best Picture	Brokeback Mountain	Won	
St. Louis Gateway Film Critics Association	January 8, 2006	Best Director	Ang Lee	Won	
St. Louis Gateway Film Critics Association	January 8, 2006	Best Actor	Heath Ledger	Won	
St. Louis Gateway Film Critics Association	January 8, 2006	Best Screenplay	Larry McMurtry and Diana Ossana	Won	
USC Scripter Awards	February 11, 2006	Scripter Award	Larry McMurtry and Diana Ossana	Nominated	
Vancouver Film Critics Circle	February 7, 2006	Best Film	Brokeback Mountain	Won	
Vancouver Film Critics Circle	February 7, 2006	Best Director	Ang Lee	Won	
Venice International Film Festival	September 10, 2005	Golden Lion	Ang Lee	Won	
Washington D.C. Area Film Critics Association	December 12, 2005	Best Film	Brokeback Mountain	Nominated	
Washington D.C. Area Film Critics Association	December 12, 2005	Best Director	Ang Lee	Nominated	
Washington D.C. Area Film Critics Association	December 12, 2005	Best Actor	Heath Ledger	Nominated	
Washington D.C. Area Film Critics Association	December 12, 2005	Best Supporting Actress	Michelle Williams	Nominated	
Washington D.C. Area Film Critics Association	December 12, 2005	Best Adapted Screenplay	Larry McMurtry and Diana Ossana	Nominated	
World Soundtrack Awards	October 14, 2006	Best Original Score of the Year	Gustavo Santaolalla	Nominated	
World Soundtrack Awards	October 14, 2006	Best Original Song Written Directly for a Film	"A Love That Will Never Grow Old" (Gustavo Santaolalla, Bernie Taupin, and Emmylou Harris)	Nominated	
World Soundtrack Awards	October 14, 2006	Public Choice	Gustavo Santaolalla	Won	
Writers Guild of America Awards	February 4, 2006	Best Adapted Screenplay	Larry McMurtry and Diana Ossana	Won	

== See also ==
- Brokeback Mountain (short story)
- Brokeback Mountain (play)
- Brokeback Mountain (opera)
- Brokeback Mountain (soundtrack)
- 2005 in film
- List of LGBT Academy Award winners and nominees
