= Brokeback Mountain (soundtrack) =

Brokeback Mountain: Original Motion Picture Soundtrack

Soundtrack album by Gustavo Santaolalla
- Released: November 1, 2005
- Recorded: February 7, 2005
- Genre: Country folk; country; soundtrack
- Length: 43:21
- Label: Verve
- Producer: Gustavo Santaolalla

Gustavo Santaolalla chronology
The Motorcycle Diaries (2004)	Brokeback Mountain: Original Motion Picture Soundtrack (2005)	North Country (2005)

Professional ratings
Review scores
Source	Rating
AllMusic	3.5/5 stars

Brokeback Mountain: Original Motion Picture Soundtrack refers to either or both the two-hour musical soundtrack edited into the 2005 film, Brokeback Mountain, and the recorded albums of music selected from the film. Some tracks have different performers substituted for those heard in the film. The entire chronological list of compositions in the two-hour soundtrack is annotated with notes about the film scenes (see below: Complete Soundtrack listing).

== Musical album recordings ==
Brokeback Mountain is the original soundtrack album as an audio CD, on the Verve Forecast label, of the 2005 film Brokeback Mountain starring Heath Ledger and Jake Gyllenhaal. The original score and songs were composed and produced by Gustavo Santaolalla. The album has shipped 300,000 units worldwide and 100,000 of them have been sold in the United States.

The album was nominated for two Golden Globe Awards: Best Original Score and Best Original Song ("A Love That Will Never Grow Old"), winning the latter. It won the Academy Award for Original Music Score and was nominated for a Grammy Award as Best Compilation Soundtrack Album For Motion Picture, Television Or Other Visual Media.

Brokeback Mountain is the name of another soundtrack album, on the Wonderful Music label, of the 2005 film Brokeback Mountain, with the original compositions performed, instead, by the Global Stage Orchestra. The release date of this album was June 6, 2006, and it has the same track listing as the Verve CD.

== Track listing of Verve CD ==
No.	Title	Lyrics	Music	Lead Vocalist/Musician	Length
1.	"Opening"	instrumental	Gustavo Santaolalla	Santaolalla	1:31
2.	"He Was a Friend of Mine"	Bob Dylan, trad.	Dylan, trad.	Willie Nelson	4:39
3.	"Brokeback Mountain 1"	instrumental	Santaolalla	Santaolalla	2:32
4.	"A Love That Will Never Grow Old"	Bernie Taupin	Santaolalla	Emmylou Harris	3:20
5.	"King of the Road"	Roger Miller	Miller	Teddy Thompson and Rufus Wainwright	2:52
6.	"Snow"	instrumental	Santaolalla	Santaolalla	1:18
7.	"The Devil's Right Hand"	Steve Earle	Earle	Earle	2:34
8.	"No One's Gonna Love You like Me"	Santaolalla	Santaolalla	Mary McBride	3:06
9.	"Brokeback Mountain 2"	instrumental	Santaolalla	Santaolalla	1:59
10.	"I Don't Want to Say Goodbye"	Taupin	Santaolalla	Thompson	3:12
11.	"I Will Never Let You Go"	Jeremy Spillman	Santaolalla	Jackie Green	1:55
12.	"Riding Horses"	instrumental	Santaolalla	Santaolalla	1:24
13.	"An Angel Went up in Flames"	instrumental	Santaolalla	The Gas Band	2:36
14.	"It's So Easy"	Buddy Holly, Norman Petty	Holly	Linda Ronstadt	2:27
15.	"Brokeback Mountain 3"	instrumental	Santaolalla	Santaolalla	2:14
16.	"The Maker Makes"	Wainwright	Wainwright	Wainwright	3:50
17.	"The Wings"	instrumental	Santaolalla	Santaolalla	1:52

Since the release of the soundtrack album by Verve Records, three remixes of the Gustavo Santaolalla track "The Wings" have been created and released by Verve on a CD single.

== Track listing for "The Wings" CD single ==
1. "The Wings" (Gabriel & Dresden's Organized Nature Remix)
2. "The Wings" (Manny Lehman, Tony Moran & Warren Rigg Collaboration Remix)
3. "The Wings" (Manny Lehman Remix)

== Personnel ==
- Gustavo Santaolalla - guitars (tracks 1, 3, 4, 6, 8 to 10, 12, 13, 15, 17), pump organ (tracks 1, 3, 6, 9, 12, 15, 17), bass (track 17), percussion (track 6), production (tracks 1 to 4, 6, 8 to 13, 15, 17)
- Mike Turner - guitar (tracks 8, 10, 13)
- Bob Bernstein - pedal steel guitar (tracks 1, 3, 4, 6, 8 to 13, 15, 17)
- Dean Parks - guitar (track 5)
- Dan Dougmore - steel guitar (track 7)
- Bob Glaub - bass (tracks 8, 10, 11, 13)
- Tony Garnier - acoustic bass (track 2)
- Aníbal Kerpel - bass (track 4), Hammond organ (tracks 2 and 4), Wurlitzer piano (track 10), mixing (tracks 1 to 4, 6, 8 to 13, 15, 17), recording and programming (tracks 1, 3, 6, 9, 12, 15, 17)
- Jeffrey Hill - bass (track 5)
- Garry Tallent - bass (track 7)
- Mike Clarke - drums (tracks: 8, 10, 11, 13)
- George Recile - drums (track 2)
- Matthew Johnson - drums (track 5)
- Greg Morrow - drums (track 7)
- Ang Lee, James Schamus, Ron Goldstein and Kathy Nelson - executive producers
- Gabe Witcher - fiddle (tracks 2, 4, 8, 10, 11, 13)
- Carmella Ramsey - fiddle (track 7)
- Tom Baker - mastering
- Tony Peluso - recording (tracks 8, 10, 11, 13)
- Mickey Raphael - harmonica (track 2)
- Larry Campbell - production (track 2)
- David Mansfield - mandolin (track 5)
- Rich Ruttenberg - piano (track 5)
- Rufus Wainwright - production (tracks 5 and 16), recording (track 16)
- Teddy Thompson - production (track 5)
- Larry Klein - mixing, additional production (track 5)
- Steve Addabbo - recording (tracks 5 and 10)
- Helik Hadar - mixing, additional recording (track 5)
- Ray Kennedy - electric guitar, production, mixing, recording (track 7)
- Steve Earle - production, mixing (track 5)
- Randy Crenshaw - backing vocals (track 11)

== Complete soundtrack listing ==
The film used a combination of original compositions and previously recorded material for background and incidental music. Much of the music used in the film does not appear on the Verve Records soundtrack CD (see above), and some of that which is on the CD is presented out of order. Here is a list of the music and music references on the film soundtrack in order of appearance in film:

1. "Universal Pictures fanfare" – On-screen Universal Pictures title card
2. "Focus Features fanfare" – On-screen Focus Features title card
3. "River Road Entertainment fanfare" – On-screen River Road Entertainment title card
4. "Opening" by Gustavo Santaolalla – Start of film; Ennis arrives in Signal, Wyoming
5. "Brokeback Mountain #1" by Gustavo Santaolalla – Jack & Ennis embark on shepherding trip
6. "Camp" by Gustavo Santaolalla – Jack and Ennis herd sheep and establish campsite #1 on Brokeback Mountain
7. (same as No. 36) "Riding Horses" by Gustavo Santaolalla – Jack rides away from camp, naps with sheep; Ennis carves wooden horse while it rains; "no more beans"; Ennis washes blue coffee pot in stream.
8. "The Cowboy's Lament" (also known as "The Streets of Laredo"; public domain) – Hummed by Ennis on horseback just before his encounter with the bear on the trail
9. "Carrying Sheep" by Gustavo Santaolalla – Montage: Jack asleep by log, setting up campsite #2, "tent don't look right" comment
10. "Harmonica #1" by Gustavo Santaolalla – Jack plays a riff of "He was a Friend of Mine" (No. 53 of this list)
11. "Water Walkin' Jesus" – Jack and Ennis talk religion around campfire
12. "Getting Drunk" by Gustavo Santaolalla – Ennis, drunk, tosses whiskey bottle, then falls asleep outdoors next to campfire
13. "Horse Love" by Gustavo Santaolalla – Ennis rides off from camp; finds dead sheep; joins Jack overlooking meadow; passionate scene in tent that night at camp; Joe Aguirre spies on Jack and Ennis with binoculars
14. "Harmonica #2" by Gustavo Santaolalla – Jack plays a riff of "He was a Friend of Mine" (No. 53 of this list) on horseback after having separated the mixed-up sheep herds
15. "Crying in Alley" by Gustavo Santaolalla – Ennis breaks down, sobbing and sick to his stomach, in an alley in Signal, Wyoming
16. "Snow" by Gustavo Santaolalla – Ennis and Alma ride toboggan; Ennis and Timmy spread asphalt; Alma & Ennis watch movie at drive-in theater
17. "Jukebox" by Ken Strange, Randall Pugh, Ron Guffnett – Playing on Jack's pickup truck radio as he arrives in Signal in 1964
18. "Trust in Lies" by The Raven Shadows featuring Tim Ferguson – Jack tries to buy Jimbo a beer
19. "The Battle Hymn of the Republic (John Brown's Body)" Traditional – Amateur band performs prior to the 4th of July fireworks show
20. "I Will Never Let You Go" by Jackie Greene – Jack meets Lureen at the Rodeo Dance (Instrumental version in the film is credited as: "I Won't Let You Go" by Santaolalla)
21. "No One's Gonna Love You Like Me" by Mary McBride/Santaolalla – Jack and Lureen dance at the Rodeo Dance
22. "All Night Blues" by The Raven Shadows – Song quietly playing on Lureen's car radio
23. Music box tune – in the nursery
24. "Post Office" by Gustavo Santaolalla – Ennis mails Jack the "You bet" postcard
25. "Kiss" by Gustavo Santaolalla – Ennis and Jack reunited in Riverton
26. "Brokeback Mountain #2" by Gustavo Santaolalla – Alma cries as Ennis and Jack leave; they arrive and jump naked from cliff into lake; "You know it could be like this, just like this always" campfire scene
27. "Flashback" by Gustavo Santaolalla – Ennis describes Rich and Earl
28. "The Wings" by Gustavo Santaolalla – Alma & Ennis fight in front of their girls (playing on swings)
29. "Tractors" (version of "The Wings") by Gustavo Santaolalla – Jack shows off a new combine; Alma reads Jack's postcard; Jack hunts for the blue parka (at 1:13:55)
30. "You Are Late" by Gustavo Santaolalla – Ennis arrives with horses in truck, Jack says "You're late." Horse riding scenes; Jack and a young Bobby ride "no hands" in a giant tractor; Ennis feeds hay.
31. "King of the Road" by Roger Miller – Jack sings with radio while driving to visit Ennis
  (Note: Roger Miller's version is heard in the film; soundtrack album's version is performed by Teddy Thompson and Rufus Wainwright)
32. "A Love That Will Never Grow Old" by Emmylou Harris – Jack leaves Ennis and drives south on highway towards the Mexican border
33. "Quizas, Quizas, Quizas" by Rick Garcia – Jack picks up a hustler in Juarez, Mexico
34. "Capriccio Espagnol Op. 34" by Nikolai Rimsky-Korsakov, performed by Philharmonia Slavonica – Music for the figure skaters on TV during Thanksgiving at Alma and Monroe's
35. "Mason Dixon Line" by Jeff Wilson – playing in the bar during the fight in the street
36. "Riding Horses" by Gustavo Santaolalla – Jack and Ennis ride horses; camp by the river; Ennis washes blue coffee pot in stream.
37. "For What It's Worth" by Stephen Stills/Buffalo Springfield – Line spoken by Jack referencing title, but actual song is not heard in film
38. "The Devil's Right Hand" by Steve Earle – Ennis meets Cassie Cartwright at Riverton bar
39. "It's So Easy" by Buddy Holly, performed by Linda Ronstadt – Ennis and Cassie at Riverton bar
40. "An Angel Went Up in Flames" by The Gas Band – Dancing at the Childress Benefit Dance
41. "I Don't Want to Say Goodbye" by Teddy Thompson – Jack dances with Lashawn at the Benefit Dance
42. "D-I-V-O-R-C-E" by Tammy Wynette – Ennis, Cassie and Alma Jr. at the Riverton bar
43. "Melissa" by The Allman Brothers – Ennis, Cassie and Alma Jr. at the Riverton bar
44. "I'll Be Gone" by T. Gadsden/F. Peterson – Song heard softly on Ennis's truck radio as he drops Alma Junior back home and drives off
45. "Brokeback Mountain #3" by Gustavo Santaolalla – Ennis and Jack's final trip; argument at lake; flashback scene of happier days back in 1963
46. "Bigger Than My Body" by John Mayer – Jack in flashback scene
47. "I'm Always on a Mountain When I Fall" by Merle Haggard – Cassie confronts Ennis at bus station
48. "Jack Deceased" by Gustavo Santaolalla – Ennis collects mail and discovers "Deceased" message stamped on his returned postcard
49. "The Dying Hobo/Big Rock Candy Mountain" (two forms of the same folk song) – Referenced by key lyrics used as dialogue, but actual song is not heard in film: line spoken by Lureen, "Where bluebirds sing and there's a whisky spring" related to song chorus lyrics "At the lemonade springs, Where the bluebird sings, On the big rock candy mountain" (1906 lyrics).
50. "Closet" by Gustavo Santaolalla – Ennis discovers the two shirts in Jack's closet; leaves the Twist home; truck drives on highway.
51. "Eyes of Green" by Jeff Wilson – Song heard on Alma Jr.'s car radio when she arrives at Ennis's trailer
52. "Ending" (version of "The Wings") by Gustavo Santaolalla – Ennis at the closet (at 2:06:56)
53. "He Was a Friend of Mine" by Willie Nelson – Roll of end credits
54. "The Maker Makes" by Rufus Wainwright – Later in roll of end credits.

== See also ==
- Cowboys Are Frequently, Secretly Fond of Each Other
- "Brokeback Mountain" short story: description of original/amended Proulx story
- List of accolades received by Brokeback Mountain: description of related film awards
