= Brokeback =

Brokeback may refer to:

- "Brokeback Mountain" (short story), a 1997 short story by Annie Proulx
- Brokeback Mountain, a 2005 film based on the 1997 short story
- Brokeback (band), a band/solo artist
