= Jumpingpound Mountain =

Mountain in Alberta, Canada

- Location within Alberta

Highest point
- Elevation: 2,225 m (7,300 ft)
- Prominence: 152 m (499 ft)
- Parent peak: Moose Mountain 2437 m
- Listing: Mountains of Alberta
- Coordinates: 50°57′03″N 114°54′29″W

Geography
- Location: Alberta, Canada
- Parent range: Kananaskis Range
- Topo map: NTS 82J15 Bragg Creek

Jumpingpound Mountain (elevation 2,225 m (7,300 ft)) is a mountain located 24 km (15 mi) west of Bragg Creek, Alberta in Kananaskis Country. It was named after Jumpingpound Creek in 1949 because a steep bank near the mouth was used as a buffalo jump by the Blackfoot First Nations.
