= Dallas–Fort Worth Film Critics Association Awards 2005 =

Annual US film awards ceremony

11th Dallas-Fort Worth Film Critics Association Awards
- Date: December 19, 2005
- Location: Dallas, Texas
- Country: United States
- Presented by: Dallas-Fort Worth Film Critics Association
- Website: dfwfilmcritics.net

The 11th Dallas-Fort Worth Film Critics Association Awards, given by the Dallas-Fort Worth Film Critics Association on December 19, 2005, honored the best in film for 2005. The organization, founded in 1990, includes 33 film critics for print, radio, television, and internet publications based in North Texas.

== Top 10 films ==
1. Brokeback Mountain
2. Capote
3. Good Night, and Good Luck.
4. Crash (Academy Award for Best Picture)
5. Cinderella Man
6. Syriana
7. Pride and Prejudice
8. A History of Violence
9. King Kong
10. The Three Burials of Melquiades Estrada

== Winners ==
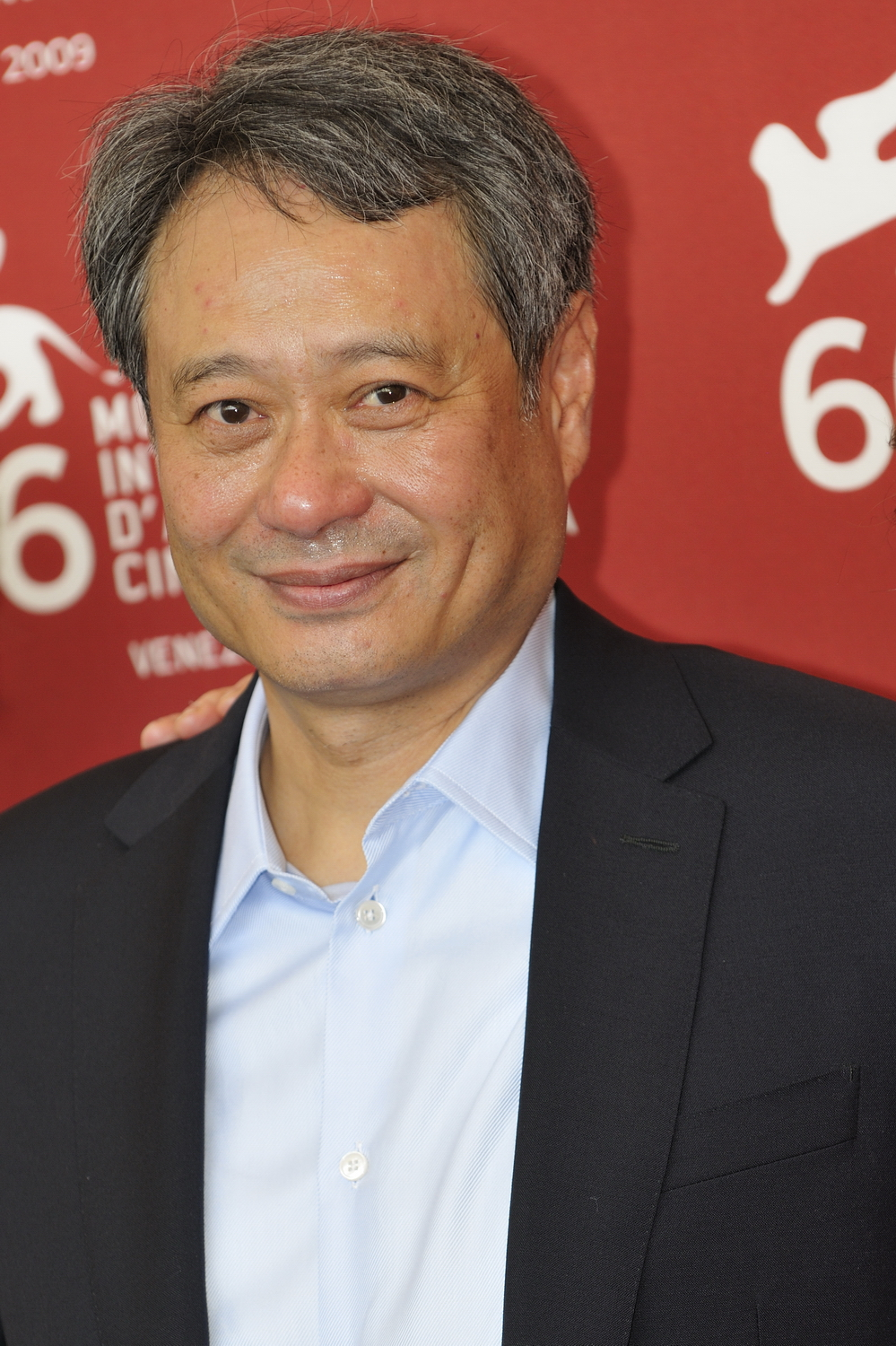
Ang Lee, Best Director winner

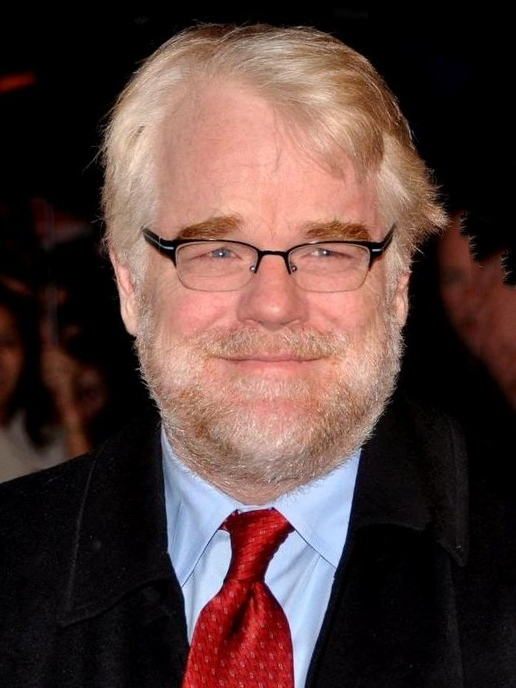
Philip Seymour Hoffman, Best Actor winner

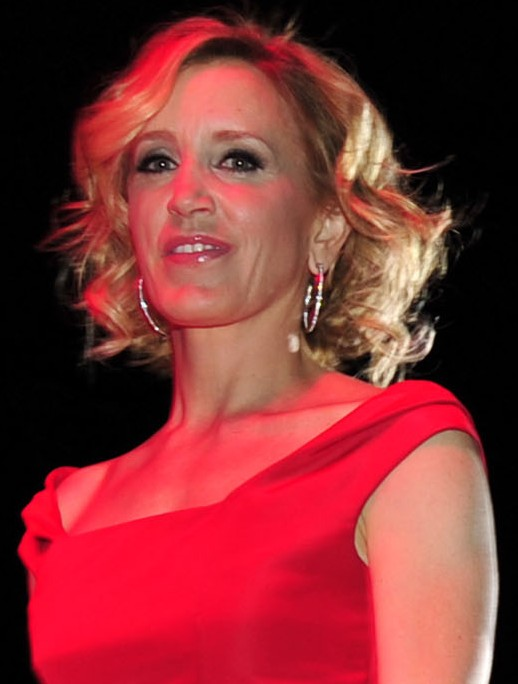
Felicity Huffman, Best Actress winner

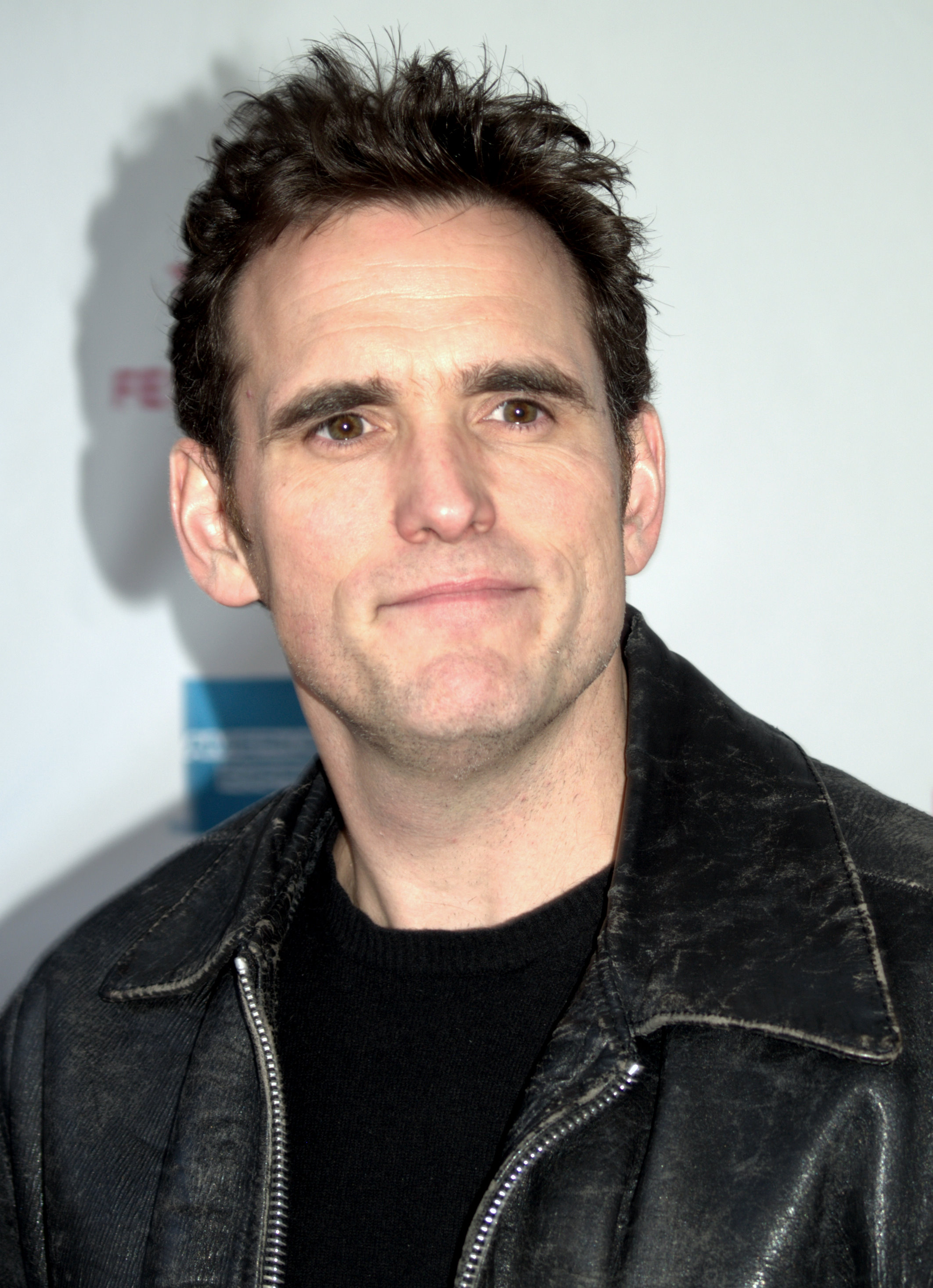
Matt Dillon, Best Supporting Actor winner

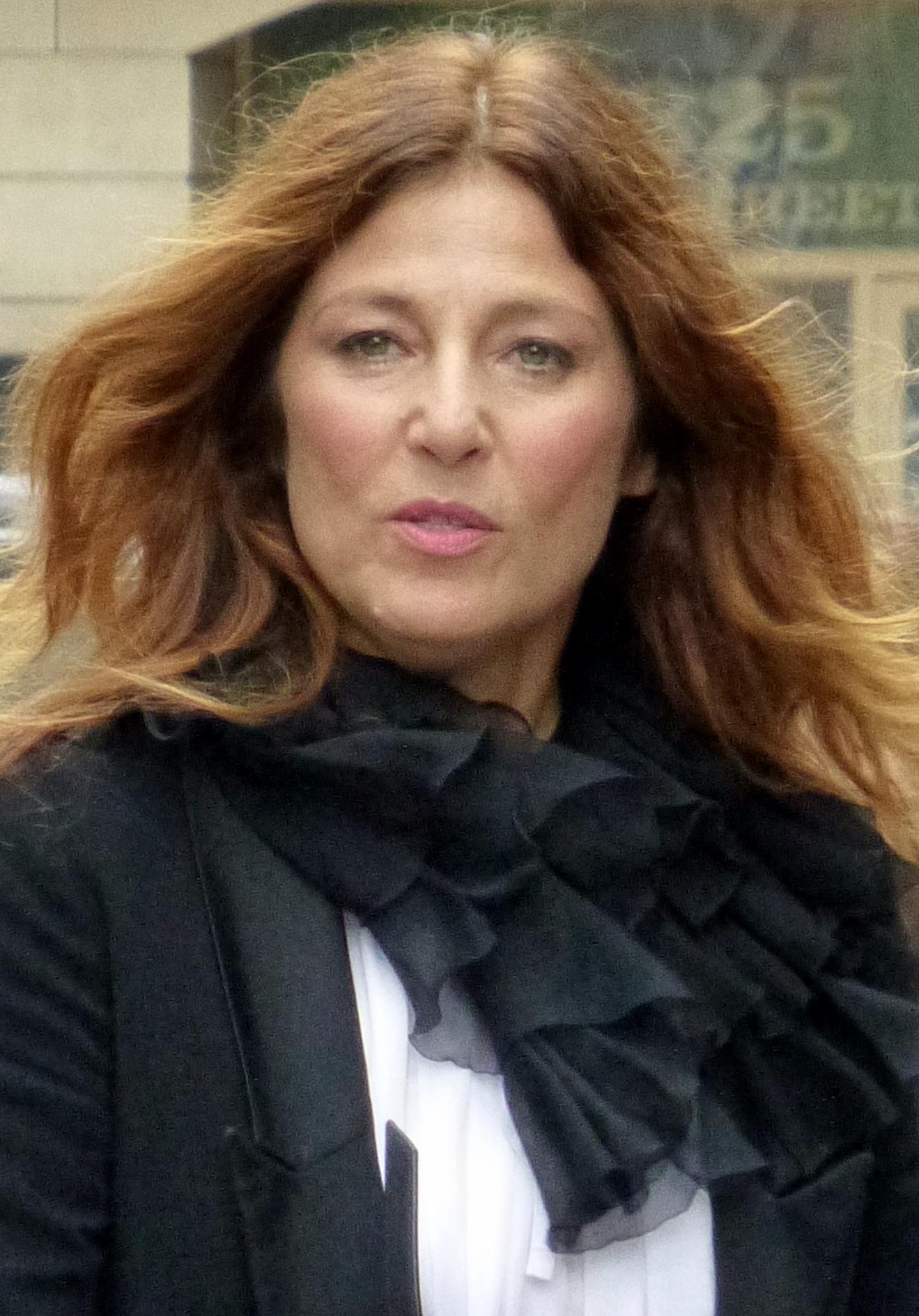
Catherine Keener, Best Supporting Actress winner

- Best Actor:
  - Philip Seymour Hoffman – Capote
- Best Actress:
  - Felicity Huffman – Transamerica
- Best Animated Film:
  - Wallace & Gromit: The Curse of the Were-Rabbit
- Best Cinematography:
  - Brokeback Mountain – Rodrigo Prieto
- Best Director:
  - Ang Lee – Brokeback Mountain
- Best Documentary Film:
  - Murderball
- Best Film:
  - Brokeback Mountain
- Best Foreign Language Film:
  - Paradise Now • France/Germany/Netherlands/Israel
- Best Screenplay:
  - Brokeback Mountain – Larry McMurtry and Diana Ossana
- Best Supporting Actor:
  - Matt Dillon – Crash
- Best Supporting Actress:
  - Catherine Keener – Capote
