= Ram Ranch =

2012 heavy metal song by Grant MacDonald

Song by Grant MacDonald
- Released: 2012
- Genre: Heavy metal; thrash metal; spoken word; novelty
- Length: 6:49
- Songwriter: Grant MacDonald

"Ram Ranch" is a song by Canadian musician Grant MacDonald. Released in 2012, it contains explicit lyrics about a large orgy of gay cowboys on the titular ranch. The song was created as a protest against radio stations based in Nashville, Tennessee, which rejected his previous music. Years after its release, the song went viral, becoming popular in Internet meme culture and prompting MacDonald to create hundreds of sequels. It was used by counter-protestors during the 2022 Canada convoy protest, where they flooded communication networks between protestors with the song and created the "Ram Ranch Resistance", which led to more memes.

== Background and composition ==
Grant MacDonald is a musician from Summerside, Prince Edward Island. Prior to "Ram Ranch", he had made numerous songs depicting same-sex themes, including "Cum God" and "Prince Harry's 12-Inch Cock". He had also directed and produced gay male erotica films. Upon attempting to pitch three songs depicting love between two cowboys to radio stations based in Nashville, Tennessee, his work was rejected. MacDonald viewed this as homophobia in the country music industry, and created "Ram Ranch" in 2012 out of spite, describing it as a "protest song" in an interview with Rolling Stone.

The loudly shouted lyrics of the song depict a story of eighteen gay cowboys having sex with each other on the titular Ram Ranch. In an interview with BuzzFeed News, MacDonald stated the song was made as an example of "how gay country music could be". The lyrics feature explicit phrases such as "eighteen naked cowboys wanting to be fucked" and "big, hard, throbbing cocks waiting to be sucked."

== Impact ==
Around 2016, "Ram Ranch" went viral and became popular in Internet meme culture. As the song rose in popularity, a fan requested that MacDonald create a sequel. He originally hesitated to do so, stating that it would've been "like Pink Floyd putting out Dark Side of the Moon 2". However, he did eventually create "Ram Ranch 2" and has since made several hundred sequels to "Ram Ranch".

=== "Ram Ranch Resistance" ===
In 2022, "Ram Ranch" was used during the Canada convoy protest by counter-protestors to troll those attending and organizing the protests, primarily by flooding their Zello channels with the song's intro. According to Rolling Stone, the song was chosen to make fun of the Dodge Ram trucks used by the protestors, as well as to subvert their patriotism since MacDonald is Canadian. As the song increased in prominence throughout the protests, the "Ram Ranch Resistance" was formed on Twitter, whose members identified themselves as "ranchers".

The "ranchers" continued to sabotage Zello channels with the song, with one of the channels having nearly 2,000 members. This specific use of the song was attributed to helping end a protest near Windsor, Ontario due to its disruptive use. According to Twitter user @NoelleNarwhal, who first started the "Ram Ranch Resistance", at least three Zello channels were shut down using the song. The "Ram Ranch Resistance" also led to a charity site dedicated to businesses affected by the protests, numerous memes, and physical signs used by counter-protestors that stated "Welcome to the Ram Ranch."

Upon learning about "Ram Ranch" being used during the counter-protests, MacDonald said that he was "totally elated that [his] song could be used to stand up for science". He subsequently created an over twenty-minute song with equally explicit lyrics called "Ottawa Truckers", specifically themed around the truckers.
