= A Love That Will Never Grow Old =

Song by Emmylou Harris

from the album Brokeback Mountain: Original Motion Picture Soundtrack
- Released: 2005
- Recorded: 2005
- Genre: Country Folk
- Length: 3:21
- Label: Verve Forecast
- Composer: Gustavo Santaolalla
- Lyricist: Bernie Taupin

"A Love That Will Never Grow Old" is a song from the film Brokeback Mountain. Its music was composed by Argentine composer Gustavo Santaolalla, with lyrics by Bernie Taupin, and performed by singer Emmylou Harris. It won the 2006 Golden Globe Award for Best Original Song, the Satellite Award and the Internet Movie Award for Best Original Song. The song was nominated at the World Soundtrack Awards for Best Original Song Written Directly for a Film but was deemed ineligible for Academy Award consideration owing to its insufficient air time in the movie. It is available on the film soundtrack.

== Reception ==
Thom Jurek from Allmusic described the song as "simple, spare, and poignant", and marked it as a highlight from the film soundtrack.
