= World Soundtrack Awards 2006 =

Belgian music awards ceremony

6th World Soundtrack Awards

October 14, 2006

Best Original Soundtrack:
The Constant Gardener

The 6th World Soundtrack Awards were given on 14 October 2006 in Ghent, Belgium.

== Winners ==
- Soundtrack Composer of the Year:
  - Alberto Iglesias for The Constant Gardener
- Best Original Soundtrack of the Year:
  - Alberto Iglesias for The Constant Gardener
- Best Original Song Written for a Film:
  - "Our Town" from Cars
- Public Choice Award:
  - Gustavo Santaolalla for Brokeback Mountain
- Discovery of the Year:
  - Evanthia Reboutsika - My Father and My Son
- Lifetime Achievement Award:
  - Peer Raben

== Nominees ==
- Soundtrack Composer of the Year:
  - Danny Elfman - Charlie and the Chocolate Factory
  - Alberto Iglesias - The Constant Gardener
  - Dario Marianelli - Pride & Prejudice
  - James Newton Howard - King Kong
  - John Powell - Ice Age: The Meltdown
- Best Original Soundtrack of the Year:
  - Brokeback Mountain - Gustavo Santaolalla
  - King Kong - James Newton Howard
  - Munich - John Williams
  - Pride & Prejudice - Dario Marianelli
  - The Constant Gardener - Alberto Iglesias
- Best Original Song Written for Film:
  - "A Love That Will Never Grow Old" - Brokeback Mountain
    - Music by Gustavo Santaolalla
    - Performed by Emmylou Harris
    - Lyrics by Bernie Taupin
  - "Can't Take It In" - The Chronicles of Narnia: The Lion, the Witch, and the Wardrobe
    - Music by Harry Gregson-Williams and Imogen Heap
    - Performed by Imogen Heap
    - Lyrics by Imogen Heap
  - "Magic Works" - Harry Potter and the Goblet of Fire
    - Music and lyrics by Jarvis Cocker
    - Performed by Jarvis Cocker, Jonny Greenwood, Philip Selway, Steve Mackey, Steve Claydon and Jason Buckle
    - String arrangement by Patrick Doyle
  - "Mdlwembe" - Tsotsi
    - Music by Kabelo Ikaneng
    - Performed by Zola
    - Lyrics by Zola
  - "Our Town" - Cars
    - Music and lyrics by Randy Newman
    - Performed by James Taylor
- Discovery of the year:
  - Nick Cave and Warren Ellis- The Proposition
  - Nigel Clarke and Michael CsaniI-Wills - The Thief Lord
  - Olivier Florio - Les Brigades du Tigre
  - Douglas Pipes - Monster House
  - Evanthia Reboutsika]] - My Father & my son
