= Gay cowboy =

LGBT slang term

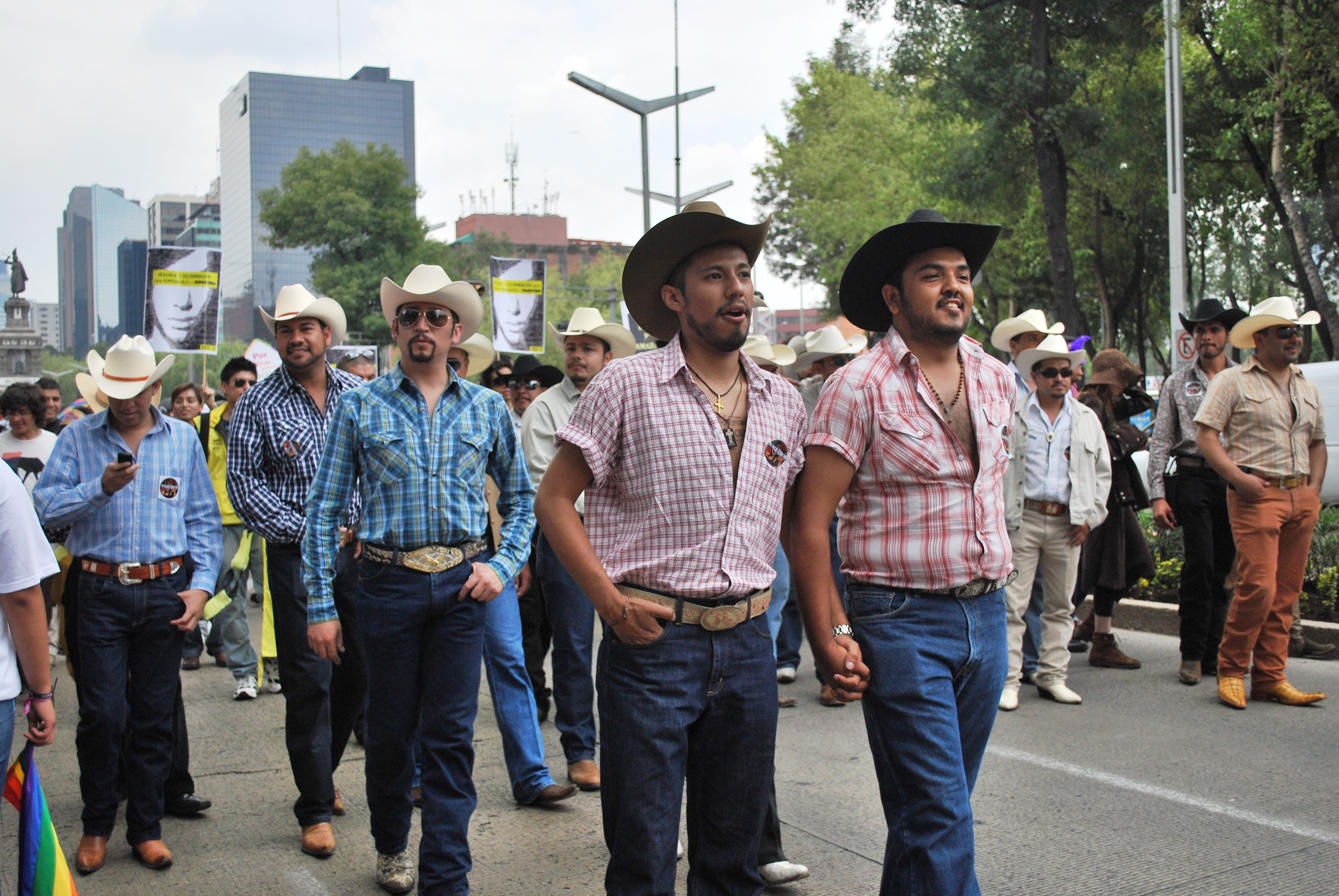
A group of Mexican gay cowboys at the Mexico City LGBT Pride Parade (2009)

A gay cowboy refers to an individual belonging to the subculture within the gay community of homosexual men who dress and behave like cowboys. This movement, which emerged mainly in the Western United States and Mexico, has spread throughout North America.

== Profile ==
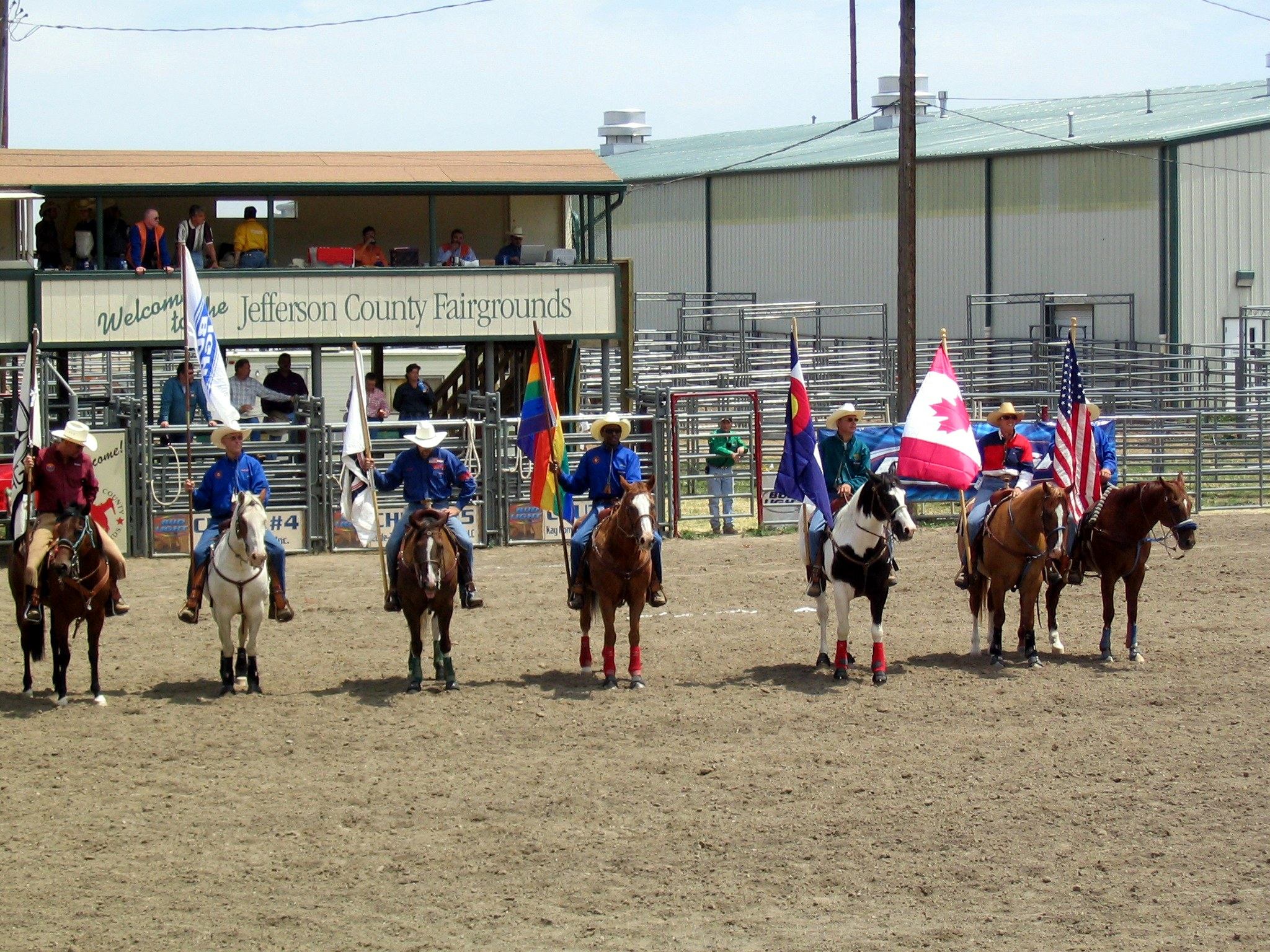
The Grand Entry at the Rocky Mountain Regional Rodeo 23 in 2005, organized by the Colorado Gay Rodeo Association

A gay cowboy is a man who has been involved with cowboy culture and wants to be part of it, and could be someone from a rural area who lives there, as well as a migrant to urban areas due to the rural exodus, but who wants to maintain some habits and customs of country life. The main distinctive feature of these men is through their clothing, such as blue jeans with large buckle belts, plaid shirts, riding boots and cowboy hats, among other elements of western wear. Regarding behavior, it tends to preserve attitudes of masculinity within the LGBT community. They claim their own sexual orientation as gay men in an environment that can be sexist, with homophobic and prejudiced attitudes towards homosexuality, where effeminate men are socially less tolerated.

Initially, Mexican immigrants in the United States learned from gay American cowboys to develop their own gay cowboy identity, later replicating in Mexico with their own cultural elements, such as ranchera music, traditional Mexican cuisine, etc.

== Popular culture ==
The film Brokeback Mountain (2005) showed the lives of two American cowboys who had a homosexual relationship in the past and later met again, both married to women. Other films with themes related to cowboy culture and gay men in ranching activities are Strange Way of Life (2023), Cowboys (2020), Power of The Dog (2021) and Dashing in December (2020).

Orville Peck, an openly gay country rock singer, wears a Lone Ranger-style mask to remain anonymous.

The 2012 heavy metal song "Ram Ranch" by Canadian musician Grant MacDonald features explicit lyrics about a large orgy of gay cowboys at the titular ranch. MacDonald created the song to protest the perceived homophobia in the country music industry in the Southern United States, after his songs were rejected by radio stations in Nashville, Tennessee because of their homosexual themes. The song went viral online and has since become a popular internet meme.

== See also ==
- LGBT people and rurality
- LGBTQ rights in the United States and the same in Mexico
