= Moose Mountain (Alberta) =

Mountain in Alberta, Canada

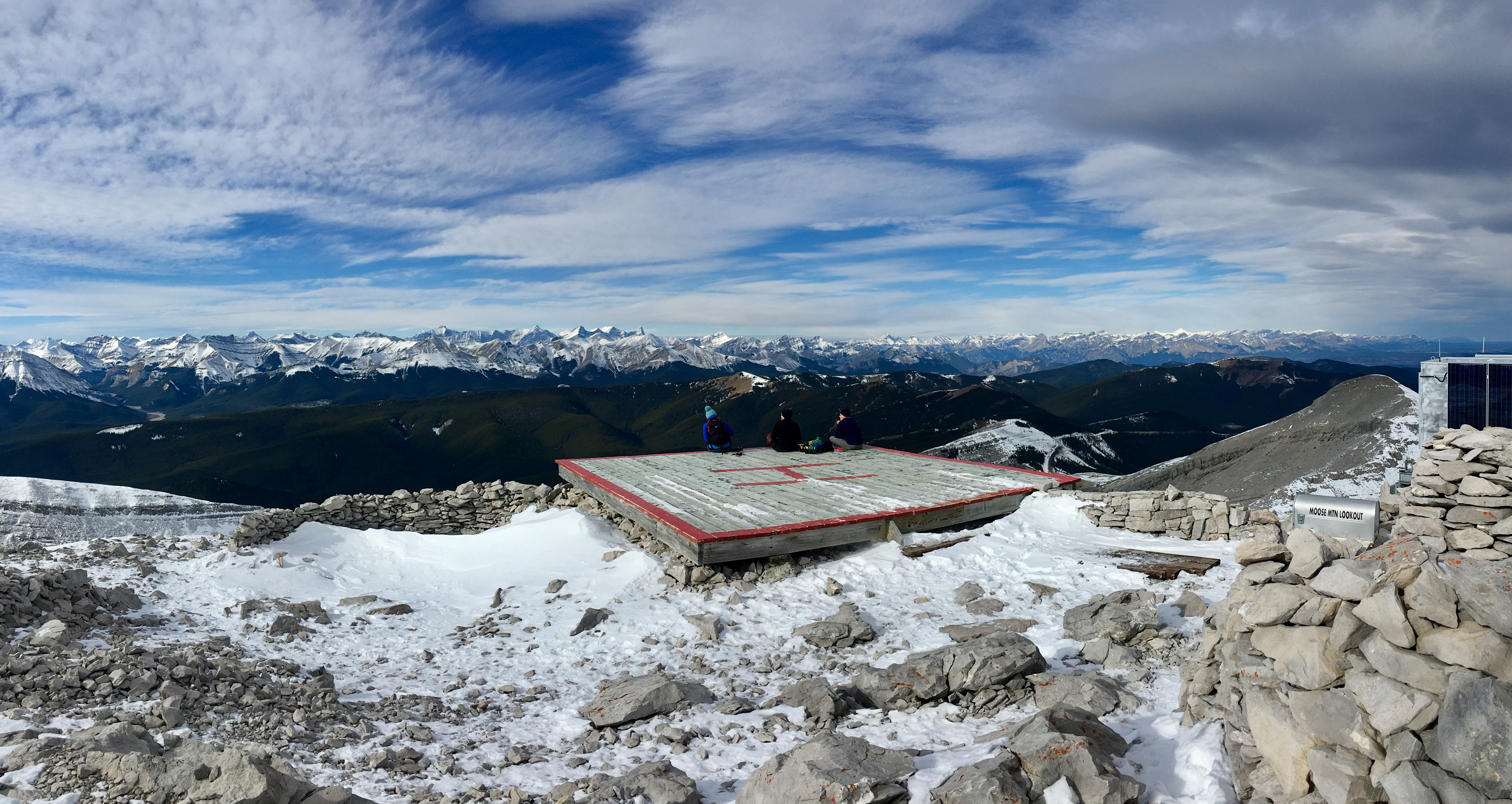
- Lookout and helipad at the top of Moose Mountain

Highest point
- Elevation: 2,437 m (7,995 ft)
- Prominence: 593 m (1,946 ft)
- Listing: Mountains of Alberta
- Coordinates: 50°56′18″N 114°50′18″W

Geography
- Location within Alberta
- Location: Alberta, Canada
- Topo map: NTS 82J15 Bragg Creek

Climbing
- First ascent: August 12, 1858 Thomas Blakiston
- Easiest route: Strenuous hike

Moose Mountain is a 2,437-metre (7,995 ft) mountain located 19 kilometres (12 mi) west of Bragg Creek, Alberta in Kananaskis Country.

Scenes in the first season of the television series Tin Star were shot on Moose Mountain.

== Gallery ==
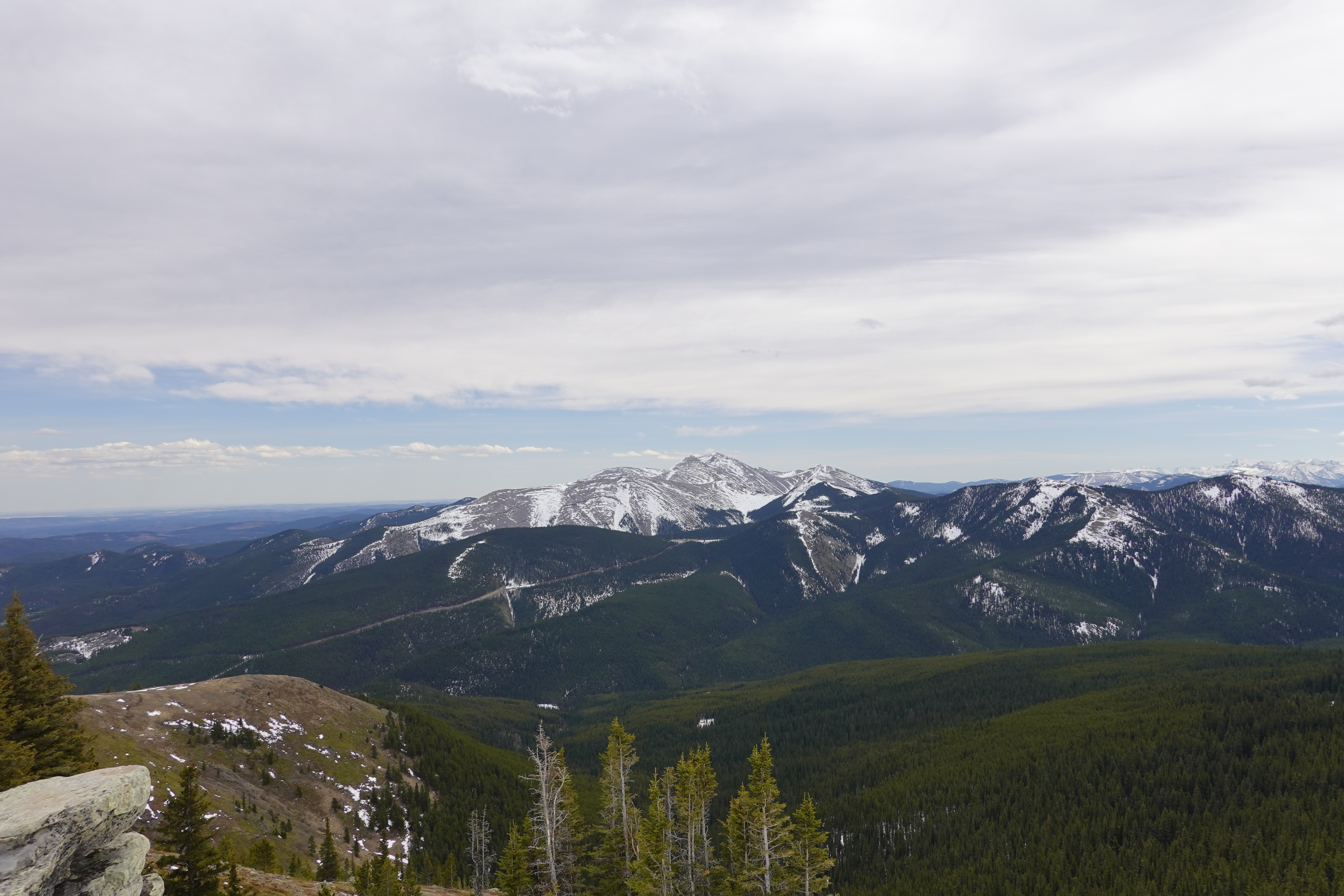
Moose Mountain seen from Cox Hill Summit

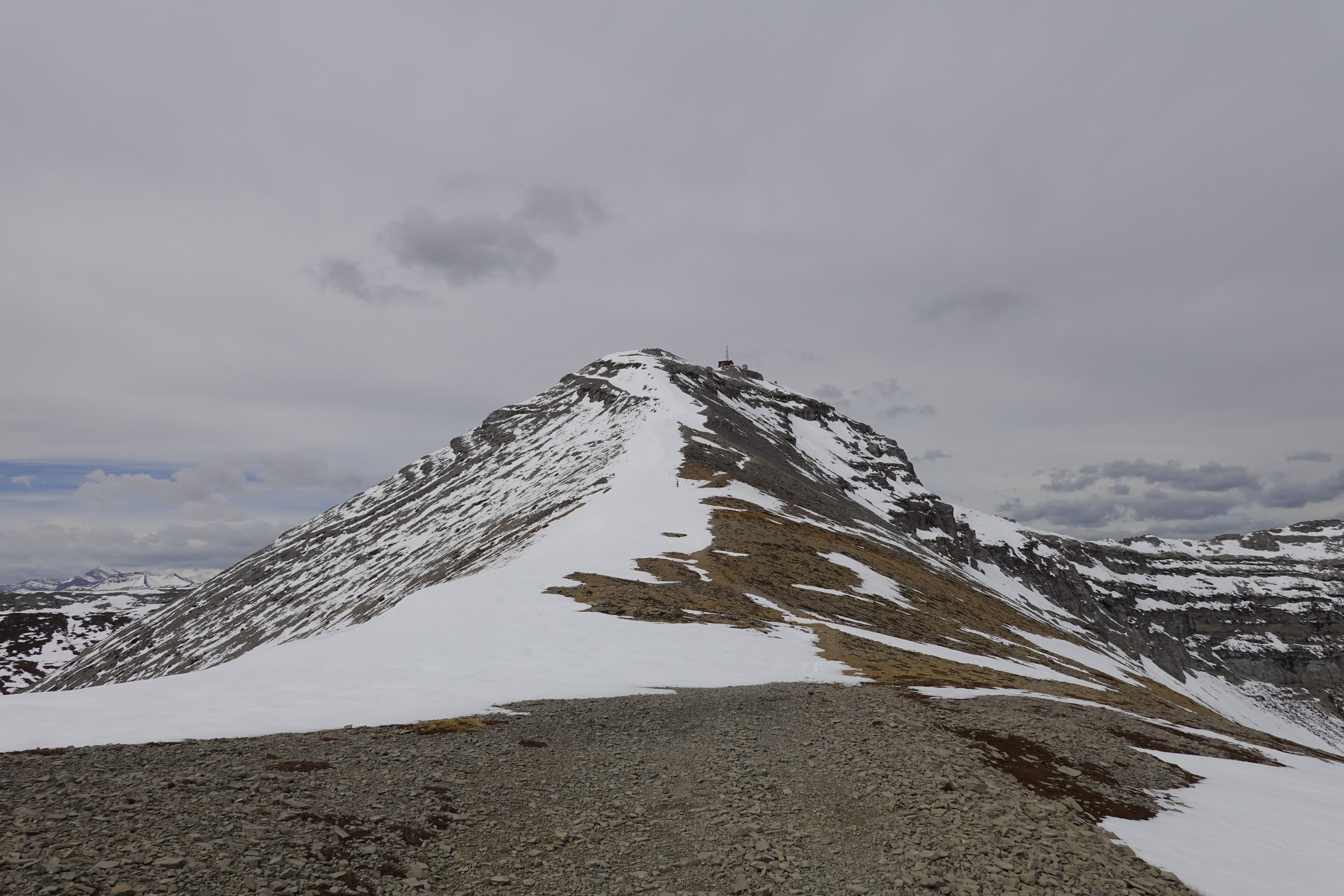
Moose Mountain from East

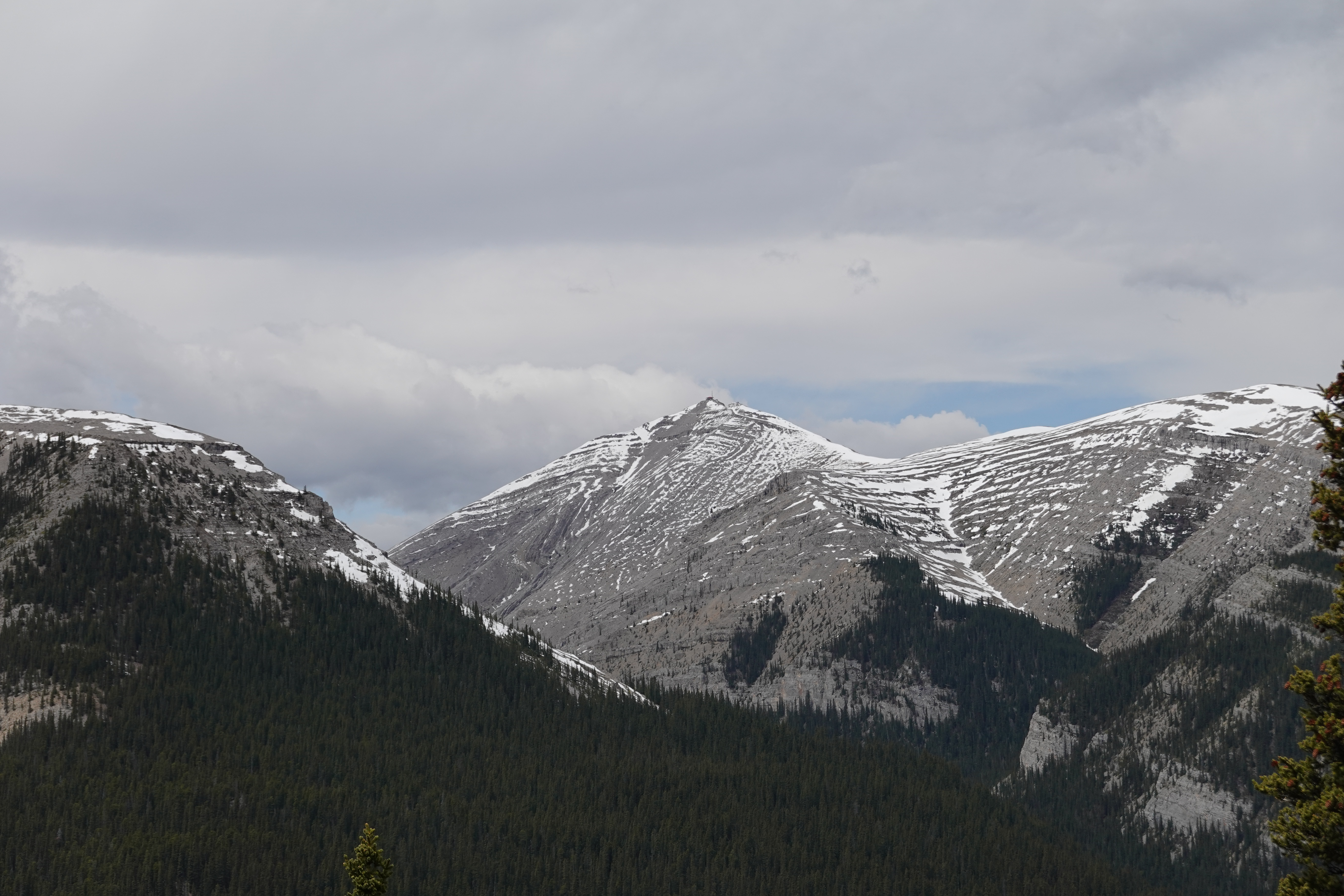
Moose Mountain from East

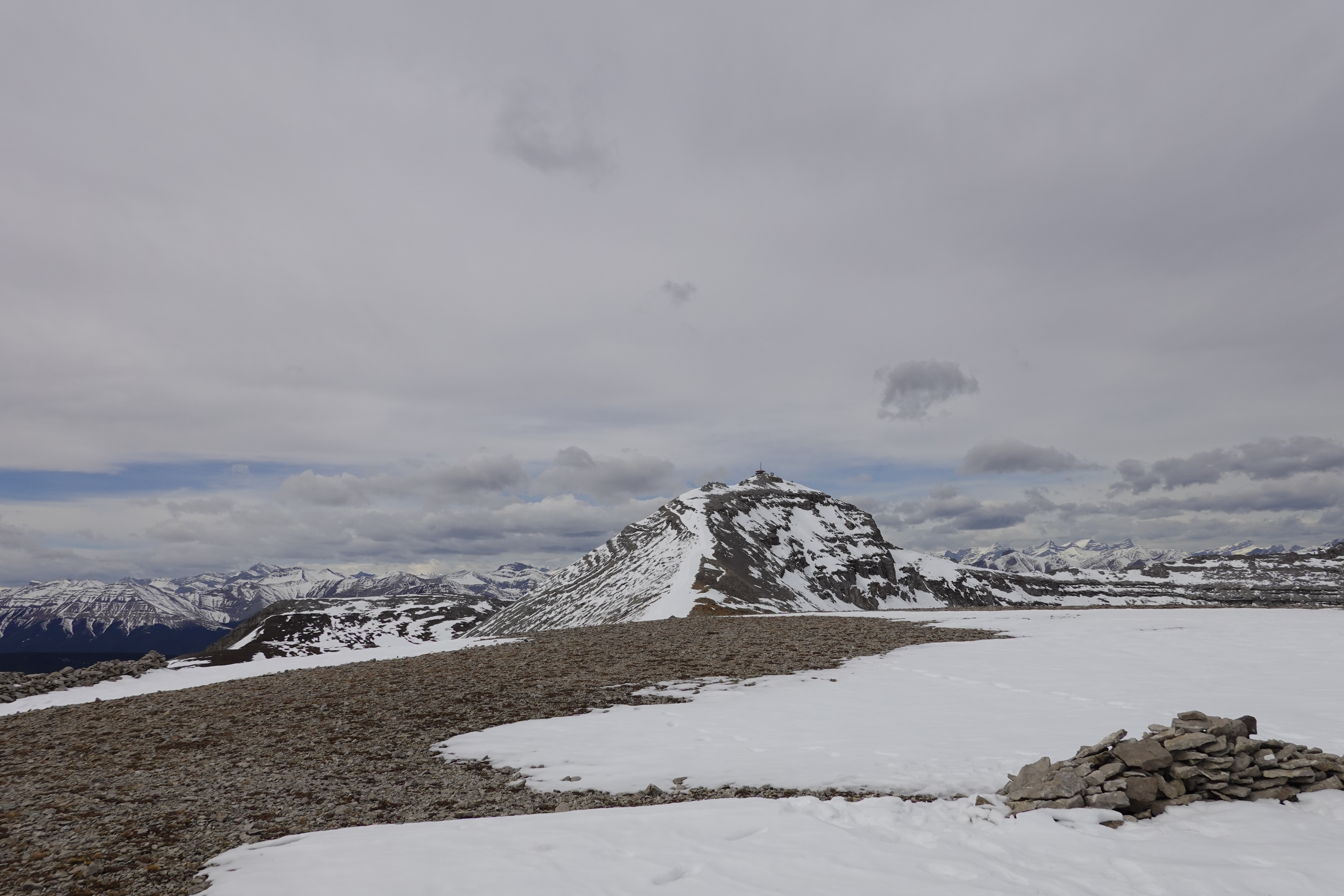
Moose Mountain from East
