= Diana Ossana =

American writer (born 1949)

- Born: Diana Lynn Ossana; August 24, 1949 (age 77); St. Louis, Missouri, U.S.
- Occupations: Screenwriter, producer, novelist

Diana Lynn Ossana (born August 24, 1949) is an American writer. A published author of several short stories and essays, she is best known for her collaborations with author Larry McMurtry, including the Lonesome Dove series. She won an Academy Award, a Writers' Guild of America Award, a BAFTA Award, and a Golden Globe Award for her screenplay of Ang Lee's Brokeback Mountain.

== Early life ==
Ossana was born to an Italian immigrant father, Livio A.A. Ossana, and Marian (Anyan), of Irish/Welsh heritage, and raised in St. Louis, Missouri. She attended Eastern New Mexico University, where she double majored in English and political science. She moved to Arizona in 1977.

== Career ==
Ossana first read the Annie Proulx short story "Brokeback Mountain" in the October 13, 1997 issue of The New Yorker magazine. She immediately urged her writing partner Larry McMurtry to read it, and asked him if he felt they could write a screenplay based on the story. McMurtry agreed they could. They wrote Proulx asking her for an option to the short story in order to write a screenplay. Proulx replied that although she did not see the potential for a movie in the story, she would agree to their option. Ossana and McMurtry proceeded to write the script, which they completed in early 1998. Their screenplay for Brokeback Mountain won the Academy Award for Best Adapted Screenplay, as well as the Golden Globe Award for Best Screenplay, the BAFTA Award for Best Adapted Screenplay, and the Writers Guild of America Award. Ossana, a producer of the film, also won the Golden Globe Award for Best Drama and a Best Film award (shared with James Schamus) for Best Film. The film was released in the United States in December 2005. Brokeback received widespread critical acclaim, and won the Golden Lion (Best Film) award at the Venice Film Festival, a Best Film award at the BAFTA Awards, and the Golden Globe Award for Best Picture - Drama. As a producer, Ossana joined cast and crew during the three months of shooting in Canada.

== Personal life ==
She currently resides in Arizona.

== Awards and nominations ==
=== Academy Awards ===
- 2005: Best Picture (nominated), Brokeback Mountain
- 2005: Best Adapted Screenplay, Brokeback Mountain

=== BAFTA Film Awards ===
- 2005: Best Film, Brokeback Mountain
- 2005: Best Adapted Screenplay, Brokeback Mountain

=== Golden Globe Awards ===
- 2005: Best Screenplay, Brokeback Mountain
- 2005: Best Drama, Brokeback Mountain

=== Producers Guild of America Awards ===
- 2005: Best Theatrical Motion Picture, Brokeback Mountain

=== Writers Guild of America Awards ===
- 2005: Best Adapted Screenplay, Brokeback Mountain
