= Brokeback Mountain (short story) =

Short story by Annie Proulx

- Short story by Annie Proulx
- Late 1990s edition
- Country: United States
- Genre: Short story

Publication
- Published in: The New Yorker
- Publication type: Magazine
- Publisher: The New Yorker
- Media type: Print (periodical)
- Publication date: October 13, 1997

"Brokeback Mountain" is a short story by American author Annie Proulx. It was originally published in The New Yorker on October 13, 1997, for which it won the National Magazine Award for Fiction in 1998. Proulx won a third place O. Henry Award for the story in 1998. A slightly expanded version of the story was published in Proulx's 1999 collection of short stories, Close Range: Wyoming Stories. The collection was a finalist for the 2000 Pulitzer Prize for Fiction.

Screenwriters Larry McMurtry and Diana Ossana adapted the story for the 2005 film. At that time, the short story and the screenplay were published together, along with essays by Proulx and the screenwriters, as Brokeback Mountain: Story to Screenplay. The story was also published separately in book form.

This story has also been adapted as an opera by the same name, composed by Charles Wuorinen with a libretto in English by Proulx. It premiered at the Teatro Real in Madrid on January 28, 2014. A play adaptation, written by Ashley Robinson with music by Dan Gillespie Sells, debuted at @sohoplace theatre in London's West End in May 2023.

== Synopsis ==
In 1963, two young men, Ennis del Mar and Jack Twist, are hired for the summer to look after sheep at a seasonal grazing range on the fictional Brokeback Mountain in Wyoming. Unexpectedly, they form an intense emotional and sexual attachment, but have to part ways at the end of the summer. Over the next twenty years, as their separate lives play out with marriages, children, and jobs, they continue reuniting for brief liaisons on camping trips in remote settings.

== Literary form ==
"Brokeback Mountain" is a story told by an omniscient narrator. The narrative is realistic in tone and employs description, metaphor and dialogue to examine the actions, thoughts, emotions and motivations of its main characters.

The narrative is mostly linear, apart from an introductory prologue (which was accidentally omitted from the initial publication in The New Yorker magazine); the story describes events in sequence from a beginning point in time, the year 1963 when the characters are introduced, to the end of the story some twenty years later. Other than the title location and the town of Signal, which is the nearest settlement to the eponymous mountain, the settings are actual locations in the United States. The characters are described in a naturalistic manner, as people living in a specific milieu. The story adheres to conventions of modern dramatic fiction; its literary devices serve to present a portrait of recognizable people in familiar situations, without supernatural or metaphysical allusions (while other of the Wyoming Stories do include passages of magical realism).

In the two-paragraph prologue, the lead protagonist, Ennis del Mar, awakes in his trailer at some unspecified time beyond the ending of the story. He has had a dream about Jack Twist, and over a cup of coffee he reflects on the time in 1963 when he first met Jack. The main narrative then begins with the description of the two protagonists as they were in 1963:

They were raised on small, poor ranches in opposite corners of the state, Jack Twist in Lightning Flat, up on the Montana border, Ennis del Mar from around Sage, near the Utah line, both high school drop out country boys with no prospects, brought up to hard work and privation, both rough mannered, rough spoken, inured to the stoic life.

From there, the story is an episodic examination of conflicts arising from the characters' interaction with each other and other people in their lives. The story condenses passing years and significant events into brief passages, and employs dialogue to reveal character and conflict.

They never talked about the sex, let it happen, at first only in the tent at night, then in the full daylight with the hot sun striking down, and at evening in the fire glow, quick, rough, laughing and snorting, no lack of noises, but saying not a goddamn word except once Ennis said, "I'm not no queer," and Jack jumped in with "Me neither. A one shot thing. Nobody's business but ours."

== Origins ==
Proulx said she wrote the story based on her own reflections about life in the West. Regarding the setting, Proulx stated:

Rural North America, regional cultures, the images of an ideal and seemingly attainable world the characters cherish in their long views despite the rigid and difficult circumstances of their place and time interest me and are what I write about. I watch for the historical skew between what people have hoped for and who they thought they were and what befell them.

She mentioned once noticing a middle-aged man in a bar, who appeared to be watching only the men playing pool, which led her to consider the life of a typical western ranch hand who might be gay.

Proulx has said that Jack and Ennis were not originally intended to be gay or to have a romantic relationship, but that when she was about halfway through writing the story, she stopped for lunch at a restaurant where the proprietress was complaining to her customers that two gay men had come into the restaurant the night before. The proprietress disapproved, served them poorly, and asked them to leave. After that incident, Proulx made the characters homosexual.

She wrote the story over a period of about six months, and went through more than sixty drafts. Working titles for the story included, "The Pleasures of Whiskey Mountain," "Bulldust Mountain," "Swill-Swallow Mountain," and "Drinkard Mountain". Proulx said her main characters of the two men affected her long after the story was published. The film version rekindled her feelings for them — an attachment that she had previously rejected. In a 1999 interview in The Missouri Review, Proulx dispelled the rumor that she had fallen in love with her own fictional characters, claiming that notion was "repugnant," and that their central duty is to carry a story. However, in December 2005, Proulx described this remark as a “lie” on her website:

There is one lie in this interview where I said I had never fallen in love with any of my characters. I think I did fall in love with both Jack and Ennis, or some other strong feeling of connection which has persisted for the 8 years since the story was written.

== Adaptations ==
=== Film ===
The film Brokeback Mountain (2005) won numerous awards, including Academy Awards (for 2005) for Best Adapted Screenplay (McMurtry and Ossana), Best Director (Ang Lee), and Best Original Score (Gustavo Santaolalla). It was nominated for 8 awards (the most that year), including Best Picture, Best Actor (Heath Ledger as Ennis), Best Supporting Actor (Jake Gyllenhaal as Jack), and Best Supporting Actress (Michelle Williams as Ennis' wife Alma). Its loss of Best Picture to Crash was not generally expected, though predicted by some.

=== Opera ===
Charles Wuorinen, a contemporary American composer, became interested in the story, and Proulx wrote the libretto to adapt her work. Their work was commissioned by Mortier of the New York City Opera and they started working together in 2008, completing it in 2012. The work premiered at the Teatro Real in Madrid on January 28, 2014.

=== Play ===
A play adaptation, written by Ashley Robinson with music by Dan Gillespie Sells, starring Mike Faist as Jack and Lucas Hedges as Ennis debuted at @sohoplace in London's West End in May 2023. Described as a "play with music", the adaptation featured Eddi Reader as The Balladeer, performing songs accompanied by a full country music band. The play was produced by Nica Burns, Adam Blanshay Productions, Lambert Jackson, Katy Lipson for Aria Entertainment and 42nd.Club (Phil Kenny, Marc Hershberg, Sharon Karmazin and Carol Auerbach).

=== Fan fiction ===
The film's popularity has inspired numerous viewers to write their own versions of the story and send these to Proulx. In 2008, Proulx said she wished she had never written the 1997 short story that inspired the film, because she has received so much fan fiction presenting alternative plots:

[The film] is the source of constant irritation in my private life. There are countless people out there who think the story is open range to explore their fantasies and to correct what they see as an unbearably disappointing story.

She said the authors, mostly men who claim to "understand men better than I do", often send her their works:

They constantly send ghastly manuscripts and pornish rewrites of the story to me, expecting me to reply with praise and applause for "fixing" the story. They certainly don't get the message that if you can't fix it you've got to stand it.

== See also ==
- List of accolades received by Brokeback Mountain
