= Brokeback Mountain =

2005 film by Ang Lee

- Theatrical release poster
- Directed by: Ang Lee
- Screenplay by: Larry McMurtry; Diana Ossana
- Based on: Brokeback Mountain by Annie Proulx
- Produced by: Diana Ossana; James Schamus
- Starring: Heath Ledger; Jake Gyllenhaal; Linda Cardellini; Anna Faris; Anne Hathaway; Michelle Williams; Randy Quaid
- Cinematography: Rodrigo Prieto
- Edited by: Geraldine Peroni; Dylan Tichenor
- Music by: Gustavo Santaolalla
- Production companies: Focus Features; River Road Entertainment
- Distributed by: Focus Features
- Release dates: September 2, 2005 (Venice); December 9, 2005 (United States)
- Running time: 134 minutes
- Country: United States
- Language: English
- Budget: $14 million
- Box office: $179.1 million

Brokeback Mountain is a 2005 American romantic drama film directed by Ang Lee and produced by Diana Ossana and James Schamus. Adapted from the 1997 short story by Annie Proulx, the screenplay was written by Ossana and Larry McMurtry. The film stars Heath Ledger, Jake Gyllenhaal, Anne Hathaway, and Michelle Williams. Its plot depicts the complex romantic relationship between two American cowboys, Ennis Del Mar and Jack Twist, in the American West from 1963 to 1983.

Lee became attached to the project in 2001 after previous attempts to adapt Proulx's story into a film did not materialize. Focus Features and River Road Entertainment would jointly produce and distribute the film. After Ledger and Gyllenhaal's casting was announced in 2003, filming commenced in various locations in Alberta in 2004. Brokeback Mountain premiered at the 2005 Venice International Film Festival, where it won the Golden Lion, and was released to theaters on December 9 that year.

The neo-Western film received widespread critical acclaim, with high praise for the performances of Ledger and Gyllenhaal. It emerged as a commercial success at the box-office, grossing over $178 million worldwide against its $14 million budget, and won various accolades. At the 78th Academy Awards, Brokeback Mountain was nominated for Best Picture and won for Best Director, Best Adapted Screenplay, and Original Score. It garnered seven nominations at the 63rd Golden Globe Awards, winning Best Motion Picture — Drama, Best Director, Best Screenplay and Best Song. At the 59th British Academy Film Awards, Brokeback Mountain had nine nominations, winning Best Film, Best Direction, Best Adapted Screenplay and Best Supporting Actor (Gyllenhaal). It was the film that topped the best of the year lists.

Brokeback Mountain was subject to controversies; its loss to Crash (2004) for the Academy Award for Best Picture, subsequent censorship, and criticism from conservative media outlets received significant attention. The sexuality of the main characters has been subject to discussion. In 2018, the film was selected for preservation in the United States National Film Registry by the Library of Congress as being "culturally, historically, or aesthetically significant". It was listed on the ballot for the American Film Institute's list of AFI's 100 Years...100 Movies (10th Anniversary Edition). Since then, it has been ranked by several publications, film critics and scholars as one of the best films of the 2000s, the 21st century and of all time.

== Plot ==
In Wyoming in 1963, Ennis Del Mar and Jack Twist are hired by the rancher Joe Aguirre to herd his sheep during the summer on Brokeback Mountain. Ennis and Jack gradually become close friends, and then have a sexual encounter after a night of drinking. At first they agree it was a one-time event, but they soon develop a long-term sexual and romantic relationship. At one point, Aguirre secretly observes them having an intimate moment. When their contract is cut short in August, Ennis and Jack have a brawl before parting ways.

Ennis marries his longtime fiancée Alma Beers and they have two daughters. When Jack seeks work the following summer, Aguirre refuses him based on his relationship with Ennis. Jack then moves to Texas and meets the rodeo rider Lureen Newsome, the daughter of a wealthy businessman. They marry and have a son. After four years apart, Jack visits Ennis and they kiss, unaware that a stunned Alma is watching. Jack says he wants to create a life with Ennis, but Ennis refuses to abandon his family. Ennis is also haunted by a childhood memory of his father showing him the body of a man who was tortured and killed for suspected homosexuality.

Ennis and Jack meet occasionally for trysts while their respective marriages deteriorate. Lureen abandons the rodeo and goes into business with her father, with Jack working in sales. Lureen's father dislikes Jack and belittles him in front of his family. After Ennis and Alma divorce in 1975, Jack drives to Wyoming and tells Ennis that they should live together, but Ennis refuses to move away from his children. Upset, Jack seeks solace with male prostitutes in Mexico.

Alma takes custody of her and Ennis' children and marries the manager of the grocery store where she works. When Ennis is invited to Thanksgiving dinner with Alma and her new husband, Alma confronts Ennis about Jack. Ennis spars with Alma and then cuts off contact with her. Afterwards, Ennis has a brief romantic relationship with a waitress. Ennis and Jack go on a trip together, but Ennis says he cannot see Jack again for months due to work demands. The pair argue about their relationship, before Jack embraces a crying Ennis.

A postcard Ennis sends to Jack is returned, stamped with, "Deceased". Ennis calls Jack's phone number and Lureen answers; she tells him that Jack died when a car tire exploded in his face. Ennis envisions a group of men beating Jack to death with a tire iron. Lureen says Jack requested that his ashes be scattered on Brokeback Mountain. Ennis visits Jack's parents, hoping to carry out his wish. However, Jack's father declares that Jack's ashes will be interred in the family plot. Jack's mother allows Ennis to visit Jack's old bedroom. Ennis weeps while holding one of Jack's shirts, which Jack's mother allows him to keep.

Years later, an aging Ennis lives alone in a trailer. His adult daughter visits him and invites him to her wedding; Ennis hesitates, but then agrees to attend. His daughter forgets her jacket, and Ennis hangs it in the closet with Jack's shirt. Tacked to the closet door is a postcard of Brokeback Mountain. With tears in his eyes, Ennis stares at the mementos and says, "Jack, I swear..."

== Cast ==
- Heath Ledger as Ennis Del Mar
- Jake Gyllenhaal as Jack Twist
- Randy Quaid as Joe Aguirre
- Michelle Williams as Alma Beers Del Mar
- Anne Hathaway as Lureen Newsome Twist
- Linda Cardellini as Cassie Cartwright
- Anna Faris as Lashawn Malone
- David Harbour as Randall Malone
- Kate Mara as Alma Del Mar Jr.
- Scott Michael Campbell as Monroe
- Graham Beckel as L.D. Newsome
- Roberta Maxwell as Mrs. Twist
- Peter McRobbie as John Twist
- Larry Reese as Jolly Minister
- Mary Liboiron as Fayette Newsome
- Marty Antonini as Timmy

== Production ==
=== Development ===
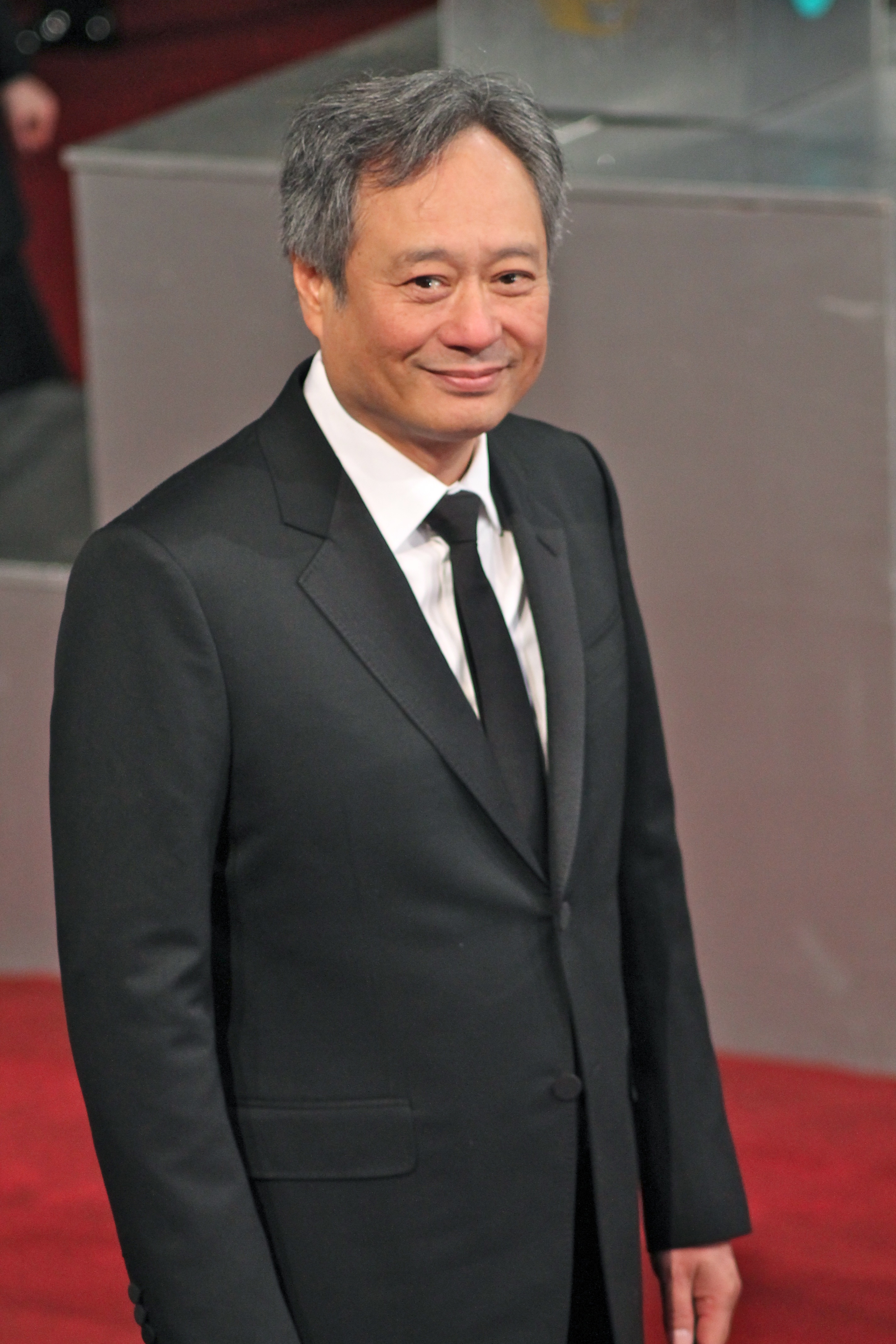
Director Ang Lee in 2013

Screenwriter Diana Ossana discovered Annie Proulx's short story, Brokeback Mountain, in October 1997, just days after its publication. She convinced writing partner Larry McMurtry to read it; he thought it was a "masterpiece". The pair asked Proulx if they could adapt it into a film screenplay; although she did not think that the story would work as a film, she agreed. In a 1999 interview with The Missouri Review, Proulx praised their screenplay. Ossana said that convincing a director and production company to make the film was a challenging and nonstop process. Gus Van Sant attempted to make the film, hoping to cast Matt Damon and Joaquin Phoenix as Ennis and Jack, respectively. He also considered Leonardo DiCaprio, Brad Pitt and Ryan Phillippe. Josh Hartnett was originally attached to the film but dropped out due to scheduling conflicts with The Black Dahlia. Damon, who previously worked with Van Sant on Good Will Hunting, told the director, "Gus, I did a gay movie (The Talented Mr. Ripley), then a cowboy movie (All the Pretty Horses). I can't follow it up with a gay-cowboy movie!" Van Sant assessed that most of the stars he approached were uncomfortable with the homosexual material. Due to the casting struggles, Van Sant went on to make the 2008 biographical film Milk, based on the life of gay rights activist and politician Harvey Milk. According to Ossana, Edward Norton, Joel Schumacher and dozens of others were approached to direct: "They all came back saying they loved it but no one would commit."

Focus Features CEO James Schamus optioned the film rights in 2001, but thought it was a risky project. Pedro Almodóvar was initially offered the opportunity to direct, but turned it down, citing concerns about artistic freedom. At Ossana's request, Schamus showed the story and screenplay to director Ang Lee. Lee decided to make Hulk instead; his experience of Hulk, and Crouching Tiger, Hidden Dragon from two years prior left him exhausted. In 2003, he considered retirement but Brokeback Mountain came back to his mind and tempted him back into filmmaking. Lee attempted to get the film made as an independent producer. However, this did not work out, and before Lee would take a break after finishing Hulk, he contacted Schamus about Brokeback Mountain. Schamus thought Brokeback Mountain embraced the American West without being a traditional Western, and told Lee that he should consider directing it. Lee said, "Towards the end [of the script] ... I got tears in my eyes". He was particularly drawn to the authentic rural American life and repression depicted in the story. Bill Pohlad of River Road Entertainment, who had a two-year partnership with Focus Features, helped finance the film.

=== Casting ===
Casting director Avy Kaufman said Lee was very decisive about the actors for the lead roles. In 2003, screenwriters Ossana and McMurty suggested Heath Ledger (after being impressed by his performance in Monster's Ball), but the film studio thought he was not masculine enough. Regardless, Kaufman sent the script to Ledger, who thought it was "beautiful" and put himself forward. Gyllenhaal reacted to the script positively and signed on for the role; he also did not want to miss the opportunity to work with Lee and friend Ledger. Lee met with Mark Wahlberg for a role in the film, but Wahlberg declined as he was "creeped out" by the script. Gyllenhaal admired Ledger and described him as "way beyond his years as a human". Other actors were considered for the leads but Lee and Gyllenhaal said they were too afraid to take on the roles.

From the beginning, Ledger wanted to portray Ennis and not Jack. He opined that Ennis was more complex; a masculine and homophobic character. Ledger said, "The lack of words he [Ennis] had to express himself, his inability to love", made the role enjoyable. Ledger, who grew up around horses, researched his character's personal traits, and learned to speak in Wyoming and Texas accents. Lee gave Ledger and Gyllenhaal books about cowboys who were gay or shared similar experiences as the characters depicted in Proulx's story. Gyllenhaal later said:

That what ties these two characters together is not just a love, but a loneliness. I think primarily it was deep loneliness. And what I always say about that movie [Brokeback Mountain], which I think maybe over time is more understood, is that this is about two people desperately looking for love. To be loved. And who were probably capable of it. And they just found it with someone of the same sex. And that does not dismiss the fact that it is about, really, primarily, the first kind of very profound gay love story. Hopefully it can create an equality of an idea: that is, it's possible that you can find love anywhere. That intimacy exists in so many places that convention and society won't always allow us to see. And we won't allow ourselves to see, because of what criticism—and danger, really—it might provoke.

Lee interviewed between 20 and 30 actresses for the roles of Alma and Lureen. Michelle Williams was one of the first to audition for the role of Alma, and Lee thought she was perfect for the part. Anne Hathaway, who was filming The Princess Diaries 2: Royal Engagement at the time, showed up to the audition during her lunch break. She was wearing a ball gown and hairpiece "that was way over the top", but she still felt focused for the audition. At first, Lee did not think she was an obvious choice, but he was convinced with her audition and cast her as Lureen. Hathaway lied to Lee about her knowledge of horse riding in order to be cast. She took lessons for two months to prepare.

Lee was happy with Ledger and Gyllenhaal portraying Ennis and Jack, respectively, because he thought their "young innocence" will help carry a love story until the end. Lee added, "I think these two are among the best in their age group [...] Jake plays the opposite of Heath and it creates a very good couple in terms of a romantic love story. The chemistry, I think, is great." Once all four leads were cast, Lee remembered being impressed with their maturity despite their young age; "It really scared me how good they were".

=== Filming ===
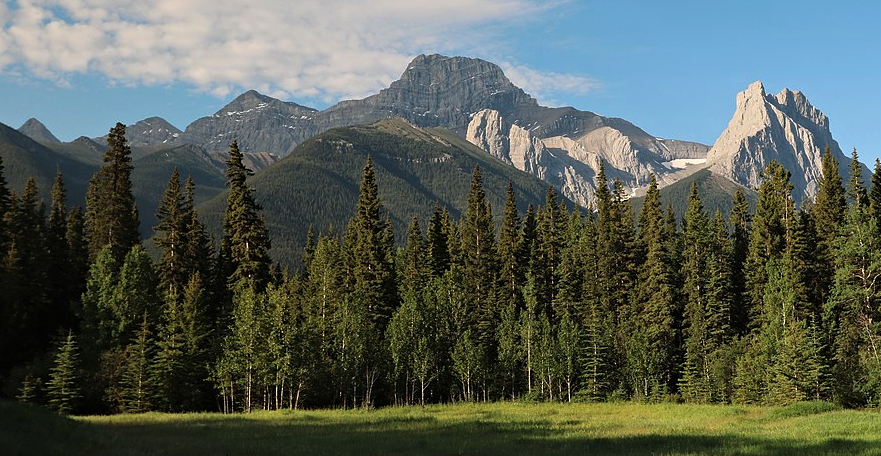
Brokeback Mountain was filmed in Alberta, Canada

Principal photography began on May 25, 2004. While the Proulx story is set in Wyoming, Brokeback Mountain was filmed almost entirely in the Canadian Rockies in southern Alberta. Lee was given a tour of the locations from the story in Wyoming by Proulx, but chose to shoot in Alberta citing financial reasons. The mountain featured in the film is a composite of Mount Lougheed south of the town of Canmore, Fortress and Moose Mountain in Kananaskis Country. The campsites were filmed at Goat Creek, Upper Kananaskis Lake, Elbow Falls and Canyon Creek, also in Alberta. Other scenes were filmed in Cowley, Fort Macleod, and Calgary. Brokeback Mountain's production budget was approximately US$14 million.

Initially, Alberta's environmental department prohibited the crew from bringing domestic sheep into the Rockies, due to a risk of disease harming the local wildlife. The authorities eventually gave permission for them to shoot on one mountain, as long as they transported the domestic sheep in and out, every day. A biologist was hired to supervise this process.

Lee prefers working with cinematographers who are open minded, eager to learn, and able to show an interest in the story and content before talking about the visuals. Therefore, he selected Rodrigo Prieto for the job; saying, "I think he's versatile, and I wanted somebody who could shoot quickly [...] he was able to give me the tranquil, almost passive look I wanted for Brokeback. I believe a talent's a talent".

Ledger and Gyllenhaal, who were friends before Brokeback Mountain, were mostly unconcerned with the intimate scenes. The first sex scene between Ennis and Jack took 13 takes to meet Lee's expectation. The director would keep his distance from them during filming, allowing the actors to be free and spontaneous. Lee said, "I don't talk too much [to them] except for technical notes. So they [the intimate scenes] are a lot easier to deal with". Ledger was observant of Lee's directing style, saying, "There's two sides to Ang's direction — there's the pre-production, which is incredibly thorough and private, and then there's the shooting side, when he just doesn't say anything at all." Ledger said that this helped him try harder during takes. Gyllenhaal echoed Ledger's sentiment; "He just totally disconnects from you while you're shooting", but praised Lee's directorial skills. In regard to acting, Ledger was sometimes disrupted by Gyllenhaal's acting style; Gyllenhaal tended to improvise whereas Ledger preferred to be highly prepared. The director allowed Ledger to see his performance on the camera monitor so that he could improve.

During the last scenes where Ennis meets Jack's parents, production designer Judy Becker was tasked in finding a suitable house. Lee took inspiration from painters Andrew Wyeth and Vilhelm Hammershoi for the white interior walls. Using two cameras, Lee would capture the actors from both angles, and then change lenses and repeat. "When you edit it together, you can apply certain emphasis to certain reactions, emotions", Lee said. Ossana remembers that the last scenes were emotional for Ledger and personally affected him. The actors who played Jack's parents, Roberta Maxwell and Peter McRobbie, said Ledger was very quiet and gave a "powerful performance".

...in the old-school way, people really used to spend their time together. They became a family. And that's what Ang created on the movie. It's why we are all still close — not just bonded by the success of the film, but bonded by the experience. It was an intimate project in that way. We'd wake up and make breakfast for each other, and hang out.

— Gyllenhaal on the film's experience

Executive producer Michael Hausman rented Airstream trailers for the cast and crew to sleep in. He created an on-set atmosphere which mimicked a summer camp, where people could bond and feel close. Hausman recalled that they would sit around the fireplaces, cook food and go fishing on the creek. The production was not without commotion; the cast suffered several injuries during filming. Williams sprained her knee in the early days of filming, therefore, her character's movements were altered to be either sitting or standing most of the time. Ledger also injured his hand when he punched a wall for a scene. During a kissing scene, Ledger almost broke Gyllenhaal's nose. The American Humane raised concerns that animals were treated improperly during filming, alleging that sheep were handled roughly and that an elk appeared to have been "shot on cue". They learned that the elk was shot with anesthetic, violating standard guidelines for animal handling in the film industry.

Production wrapped up on August 5, 2004. Two additional establishing shots were filmed in early January 2005, before the picture was locked on January 14.

During post-production, Geraldine Peroni and Dylan Tichenor served as film editors, but Peroni died in August 2004 and Tichenor took over. The pair relied on Media Composer for editing, and sound engineer Eugene Gearty used Pro Tools for the creation of sound effects. Buzz Image Group were hired to create 75 visual effect shots, including computer-generated clouds, landscapes and sheep; the work took place between September 20 and December 23, 2004. For the film's theatrical poster, Schamus took inspiration from James Cameron's Titanic, which depicts two star-crossed lovers. The sound design and editing were completed on March 9, 2005, with the final master for the film being delivered to print manufacturers on April 8.

=== Music ===
Gustavo Santaolalla wrote the film's score, as well as a number of new songs for the movie. The score was recorded on February 7, 2005, and the album was released on October 25. The soundtrack album contains a mix of cues from the instrumental score; new songs composed by Santaolalla (some with Bernie Taupin and Jeremy Spillman) recorded by other artists including Emmylou Harris, Mary McBride, Teddy Thompson, Jackie Greene; new recordings from Willie Nelson and Rufus Wainwright; and existing source music used in the movie.

Based on the story and one conversation with the director, Santaolalla was able to score the music before filming began. He said, "I mean if you are connected to the story and to the director, it makes a lot of sense because somehow you know, the music then becomes a part of the fabric of that film from the very beginning." He also used a real orchestra and played his own guitar.

== Release ==
=== Box office ===
The film received a limited release in the United States on December 9, 2005, and grossed $547,425 in its first weekend. Over the Christmas weekend, and beginning of January 2006, the film expanded into more domestic theaters. On January 20, the film opened in 1,194 theaters, then 1,652 theaters on January 27, and 2,089 theaters on February 3, its widest release.

Brokeback Mountain was released in one theater in London on December 30 and received a wider release in the United Kingdom on January 6, 2006. The film was released in France on January 18, to 155 theaters, expanding to 290 by the third week. In its first week of release, Brokeback Mountain was in third place at the French box office. In Italy, the film grossed more than €890,000 in three days and was the fourth highest-grossing film in its first week. The film was released in Australia on January 26, where it ranked fourth place at the weekend box office. Brokeback Mountain was released in many other countries during the first three months of 2006. During its first week of release in Hong Kong, Brokeback Mountain was ranked first place at the box office, earning more than US$473,868 ($22,565 per theater). The film opened in Lee's native Taiwan on January 20. The film grossed $83 million in North America and $95 million internationally, for a worldwide $178 million. It is the highest-grossing release for Focus Features.

The film was re-released in theaters in June 2025, to celebrate its 20th anniversary.

=== International distribution ===
The film has been given different titles in accordance to different languages and regions. For the film's release in French, Italian and Portuguese, it was titled Le Secret de Brokeback Mountain, I segreti di Brokeback Mountain and O Segredo de Brokeback Mountain (The Secret(s) of Brokeback Mountain), respectively. In Canadian French, the title is Souvenirs de Brokeback Mountain (Memories of Brokeback Mountain). The film received two Spanish titles: Brokeback Mountain: En terreno vedado (In a forbidden terrain) for its release in Spain and Secreto en la Montaña (Secret in the mountain) for its release in Latin America. In Hungarian, the title was Túl a barátságon (Beyond friendship).

I think they are genuinely happy to see a Chinese director win an Academy Award with good artistic value. I think that pride is genuine, so I would not think that's hypocritical at all [...] I don't know how to describe it, it's just something else. So what can I say?

— Ang Lee, responding to being celebrated in China for winning the Best Director Academy Award, although the film was not released there.

The film was met with mixed responses in some regions, particularly China and Islamic nations of western Asia. According to reports, the film was not shown in theaters in China, though it was freely available in bootleg DVD and VHS. The Chinese government said the audience would have been too small; the foreign media accused the government of censorship. The word brokeback (Chinese: 断背; pinyin: duànbèi) also entered the Chinese lexicon as a slang for homosexuality. Brokeback Mountain was dubbed "the gay cowboy movie" by the press, a term that was propelled into the American vernacular. The film was also released in Turkey.

In the Middle East, distribution of the film became a political issue. Homosexuality is criminalized in most Islamic nations and is taboo in the few countries where it is legal. Lebanon was the only Arab country to show the film, although in a censored format. The film was officially banned from screenings in the United Arab Emirates; however, the DVD of the film was permitted to be rented from stores such as Blockbuster Video.

On December 8, 2008, the Italian state-owned television channel Rai Due aired a censored version of the film, removing all the scenes with homoerotic references. Viewers protested, saying the deletions made the plot hard to follow. The Arcigay organisation accused the channel of homophobic censorship. The state-owned television network RAI said the Italian film distributor had mistakenly censored the film. RAI showed an uncensored version of the film on March 17, 2009.

=== Home media ===
Brokeback Mountain was the first major film to be released simultaneously on both DVD and digital download via the Internet. It was released in the United States on April 4, 2006. More than 1 million copies of the DVD were sold in the first week, and it was the third-biggest seller of the week, behind Disney's The Chronicles of Narnia: The Lion, the Witch and the Wardrobe and King Kong. Although the ranking fluctuated daily, by late March and early April 2006, Brokeback Mountain had been the top-selling DVD on Amazon.com for several days running.

The DVD in Europe was released in the UK on April 24, 2006. This was followed by France in July, and Poland in September, a considerable time after the theater release in both countries. Brokeback Mountain was re-released in a collector's edition on January 23, 2007. On the same day, it was also released in HD DVD format. The film was released on Blu-ray in the UK on August 13, 2007, and in the U.S. on March 10, 2009. The Blu-ray contains special features including interviews with the screenwriters, director and a short documentary about composer Gustavo Santaolalla. Kino Lorber released the film on Ultra HD Blu-ray on July 16, 2024.

=== Critical response ===
Brokeback Mountain was released to critical acclaim. On the review aggregator Rotten Tomatoes, the film holds an approval rating of 88% based on 253 reviews. The site's critical consensus reads, "A beautifully epic Western, Brokeback Mountain's love story is imbued with heartbreaking universality, helped by moving performances by Heath Ledger and Jake Gyllenhaal." On Metacritic, the film has a rating of 87/100 based on 41 reviews, indicating "universal acclaim".

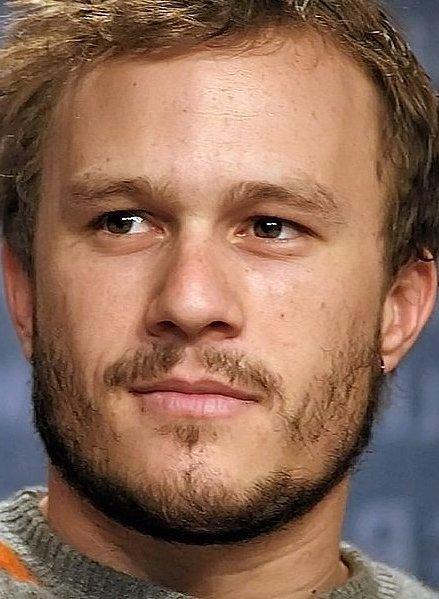
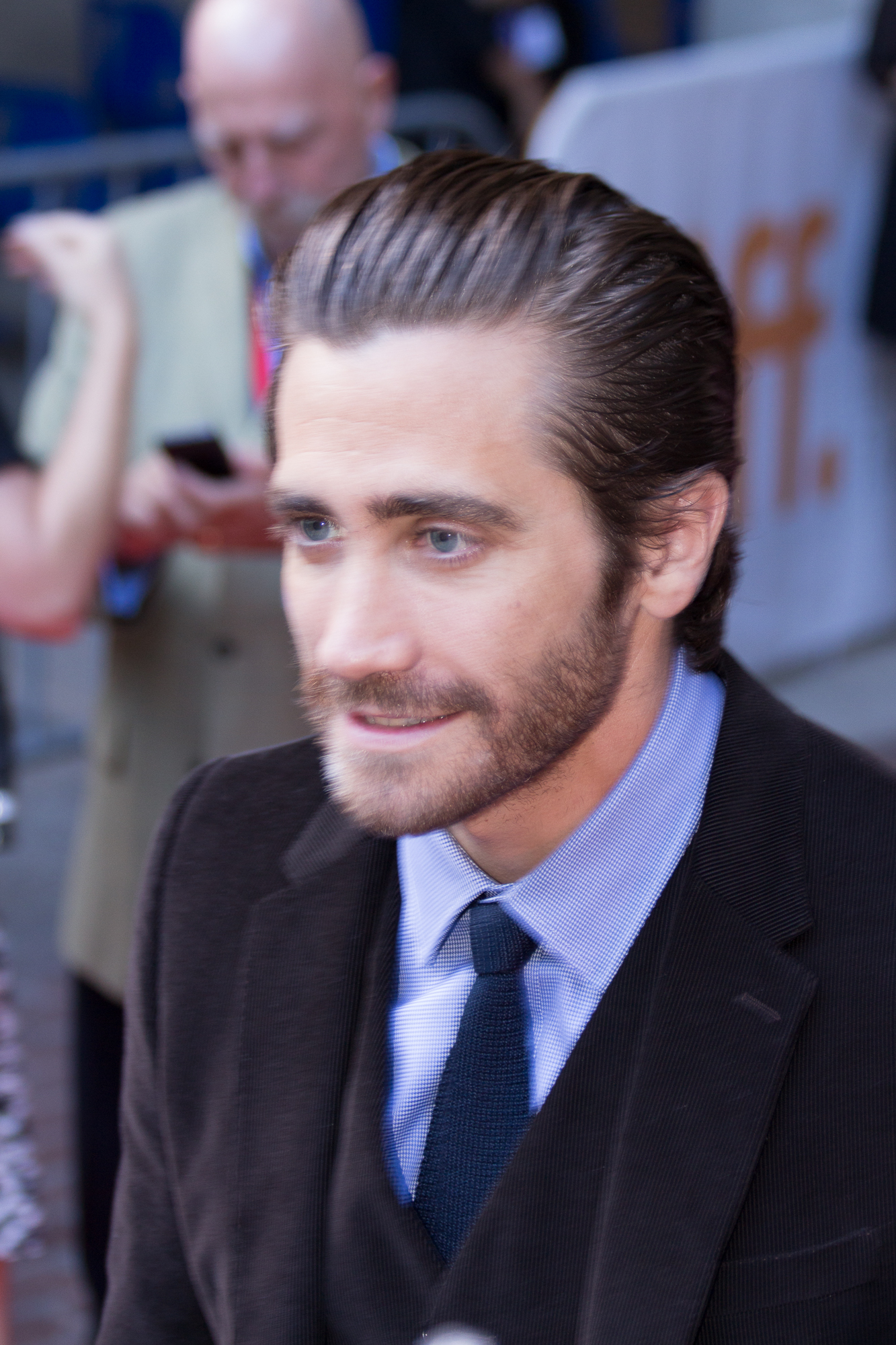
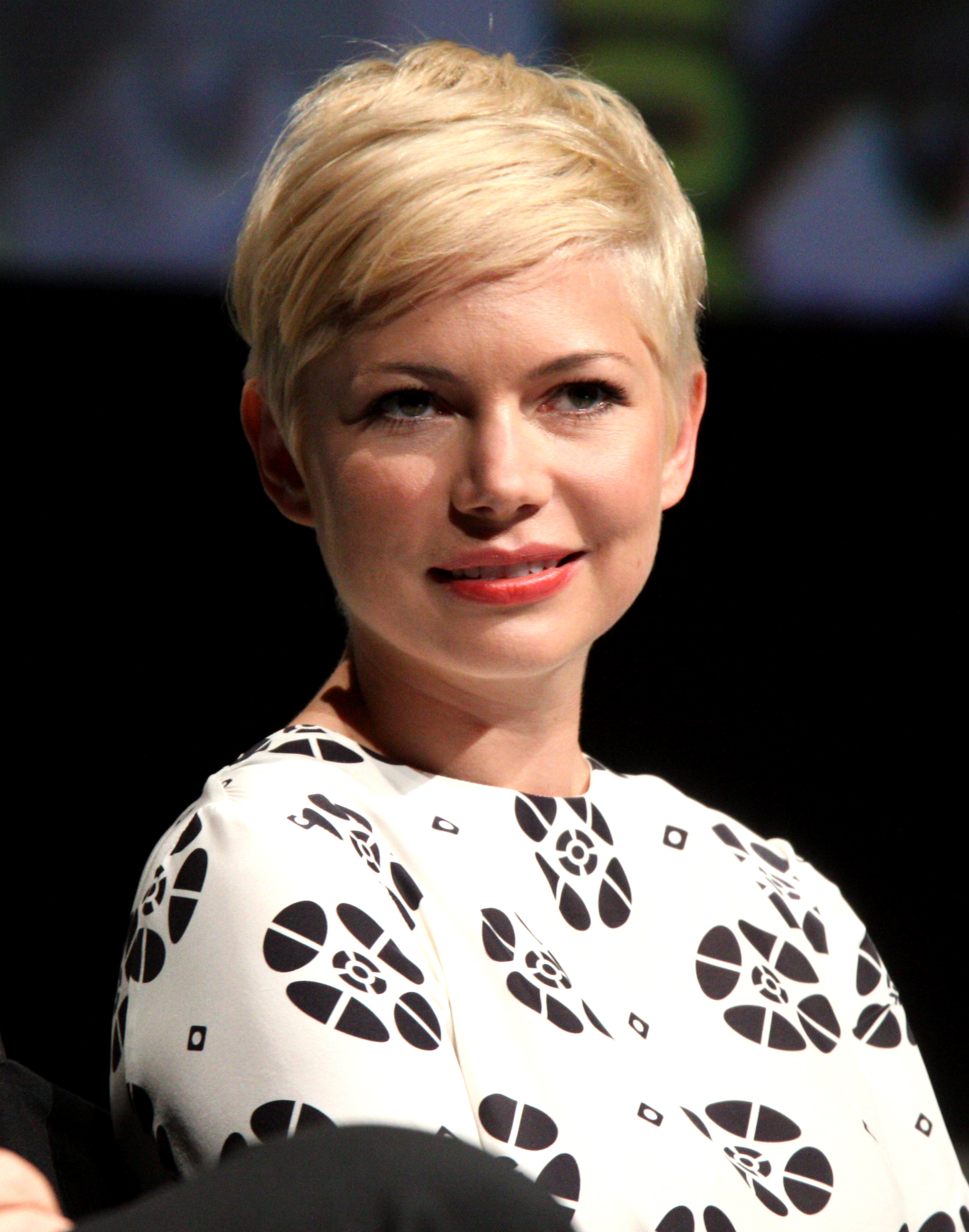
The performances of Heath Ledger, Jake Gyllenhaal and Michelle Williams garnered widespread critical acclaim, earning them Academy Award nominations for Best Actor, Best Supporting Actor and Best Supporting Actress respectively.

David Ansen of Newsweek gave the film a positive review, praising the faithful screenplay. He adds, "There's neither coyness nor self-importance in Brokeback Mountain—just close, compassionate observation, deeply committed performances, a bone-deep feeling for hardscrabble Western lives. Few films have captured so acutely the desolation of frustrated, repressed passion." Writing for The Guardian, Peter Bradshaw praised Ledger and Gyllenhaal for their complementary performances. Bradshaw thought the film was "extremely moving, tragic even, and sensitive towards the feelings of the simple wives who attempt to understand their troubled husbands." Ann Hornaday of The Washington Post was equally positive, opining that the two lead actors' performances were unforgettable. In particular, she thought Ledger was impressive in his portrayal of a reserved and emotionally affected Ennis. Hornaday also praised the costumes and sets, writing "The Wyoming vistas are flawlessly manicured, Ledger and Gyllenhaal perfectly costumed and coiffed; even Ennis and Alma's sad little apartment over a laundromat seems to have been designed to death."

Roger Ebert gave Brokeback Mountain a rating of four out of four stars in his review. Ebert was impressed with the level of attention to the characters, and thought that the film was as observant as the work by Swedish filmmaker Ingmar Bergman. Writing for The Sydney Morning Herald, Sandra Hall praised the screenplay and called Ledger and Gyllenhaal "finely tuned". Noting that it is a slow film, Hall thought the filmmakers had adapted Proulx's story without missing any nuances. USA Today's Mike Clark observed that Brokeback Mountain was directed and photographed with restraint, and praised its old-fashioned quality, and "unassuming but people-oriented" nature. The film also received a positive reaction from Christianity Today; the reviewer gave the film 3 out of 4 stars. In a mixed review, Ed Gonzalez of Slant magazine thought the film was too long, and the critic from Time magazine felt that the story became less intense towards the end. Conservative radio host Michael Medved described it as "extremely well done" and that as a film, it was "better than the agenda".

Several conservative political pundits, including commentators Bill O'Reilly, John Gibson, and Cal Thomas, shared Medved's view of the "agenda". Gibson made jokes about the film on his Fox News Radio program for months after its release. After the death of Ledger in 2008, Gibson was criticized for mocking the deceased actor, and later apologized. Conservative radio host Rush Limbaugh referred to the film as "Bareback Mountain" and "Humpback Mountain". Don Imus referred to the film as "Fudgepack Mountain". Several conservative Christian groups, such as Concerned Women for America (CWA) and Focus on the Family, criticized the film for its subject matter. Following the success of Brokeback Mountain, Capote, and Transamerica at the Golden Globes Awards in 2006, Janice Crouse, a CWA member, cited these films as examples of how "the media elites are proving that their pet projects are more important than profit", and suggested they were not popular enough to warrant critical acclaim.

Film critic Gene Shalit, of The Today Show, described the character of Jack Twist as a "sexual predator" who "tracks Ennis down and coaxes him into sporadic trysts." The LGBTQ media group GLAAD said that Shalit's characterization of Twist was like calling Jack in Titanic a sexual predator due to his romantic pursuit of Rose. Shalit's openly gay son, Peter Shalit, wrote an open letter to GLAAD: "He [Gene] may have had an unpopular opinion of a movie that is important to the gay community, but he defamed no one, and he is not a homophobe." Gene Shalit later apologized for his review: "I did not intend to use a word that many in the gay community consider incendiary... I certainly had no intention of casting aspersions on anyone in the gay community or on the community itself. I regret any emotional hurt that may have resulted from my review of Brokeback Mountain."

Some commentators accused the filmmakers for hiding content about the film in advertising and in public events, such as press conferences and award ceremonies. New York Daily News writer Wayman Wong, Dave Cullen and Daniel Mendelsohn argued that the director, cast, and publicists avoided using the word gay to describe the story, and noted that the film's trailer did not show a kiss between the two men but showed a heterosexual love scene. The film's significance has been attributed to its portrayal of a same-sex relationship focused solely on the characters, as the film does not refer in any manner to the broader history of various LGBT social movements. It emphasizes the tragic love story aspect, and many critics have compared Ennis and Jack's drama to classic and modern romances such as Romeo and Juliet or Titanic, often using the term star-crossed lovers.

Proulx praised the film as "huge and powerful", adding, "I may be the first writer in America to have a piece of writing make its way to the screen whole and entire. [...] I was astonished that the characters of Jack and Ennis came surging into my mind again".

Critics' lists of 2005

Brokeback Mountain appeared on numerous American critics' lists as one of their favorite films of 2005.

- 1st – Stephen Holden, The New York Times
- 1st – Joe Morgenstern, The Wall Street Journal
- 1st – Rene Rodriguez, Miami Herald
- 1st – Ruthie Stein, San Francisco Chronicle
- 1st – Scott Tobias, The A.V. Club
- 2nd – Peter Travers, Rolling Stone
- 2nd – Lisa Schwarzbaum, Entertainment Weekly
- 2nd – Noel Murray, The A.V. Club
- 2nd – Desson Thompson, The Washington Post
- 2nd – Kevin Thomas, Los Angeles Times
- 2nd – Mike Clark and Claudia Puig, USA Today
- 3rd – Owen Gleiberman, Entertainment Weekly
- 3rd – Kenneth Turan, Los Angeles Times
- 3rd – Shawn Levy, Portland Oregonian
- 3rd – William Arnold, Seattle Post-Intelligencer
- 4th – David Ansen, Newsweek
- 4th – Keith Phipps, The A.V. Club
- 4th – Michael Atkinson, Village Voice
- 5th – Roger Ebert, Chicago Sun-Times
- 5th – Mike Russell, Portland Oregonian
- 5th – Michael Wilmington, Chicago Tribune
- 6th – Alison Benedikt, Chicago Tribune
- 6th – Ella Taylor, L.A. Weekly
- 7th – Nathan Rabin, The A.V. Club
- 7th – Mick LaSalle, San Francisco Chronicle
- 7th – Richard Roeper, Ebert & Roeper
- 8th – Mick LaSalle, San Francisco Chronicle
- Top 9 (listed alphabetically) - New York Film Critics Online
- 10th – Michael Phillips, Chicago Tribune
- Top 10 (listed alphabetically) – Manohla Dargis, The New York Times
- Top 10 (listed alphabetically) – Steven Rea, The Philadelphia Inquirer
- Top 10 (listed alphabetically) – Peter Rainer, The Christian Science Monitor
- Top 10 (listed alphabetically) – Carina Chocano, Los Angeles Times

The film was picked as one of the 400 nominated films for the American Film Institute list AFI's 100 Years...100 Movies (10th Anniversary Edition). Entertainment Weekly put it on its end-of-the-decade, best-of list. In a 2016 international poll conducted by BBC, Brokeback Mountain was ranked the 40th greatest film since 2000. In 2019, The Guardian ranked the film 66th in its 100 best films of the 21st century list. In 2025, the film ranked number 17 on The New York Times' list of "The 100 Best Movies of the 21st Century" and number 30 on the "Readers' Choice" edition of the list.

=== Legal issues ===
On January 6, 2006, Utah Jazz owner Larry H. Miller removed the film from theaters at the Jordan Commons entertainment complex in Sandy, Utah. Miller said the film's content had no resemblance of a traditional family, which he believed is "dangerous". Focus Features threatened legal action and announced it would no longer do business with him.

On March 23, 2006, Randy Quaid, who portrayed Joe Aguirre in the film, filed a lawsuit against Focus Features for misrepresenting Brokeback Mountain as "a low-budget, art house film with no prospect of making any money", in order to secure his role for a cheaper rate. On May 4, Quaid's publicist said he dropped the lawsuit as the company agreed to pay him a settlement; the company denies this, however.

== Accolades ==
Brokeback Mountain garnered awards and nominations in a variety of categories, including for its directing, screenplay, acting, original score, and cinematography. At the 78th Academy Awards, Brokeback Mountain was nominated for the Academy Award for Best Picture and won three awards for Best Director, Best Adapted Screenplay, and Original Score. The film garnered seven nominations at the 63rd Golden Globe Awards, winning four for Best Motion Picture – Drama, Best Director, Best Screenplay and Best Song. At the 59th British Academy Film Awards, Brokeback Mountain was nominated for nine awards, winning in the categories of Best Film, Best Direction, Best Adapted Screenplay and Best Supporting Actor for Jake Gyllenhaal.

=== Best Picture controversy ===
After Brokeback Mountain lost the Academy Award for Best Picture to Crash, some critics accused the Academy of homophobia and for making a non-groundbreaking choice. Commentators including Kenneth Turan and Nikki Finke derided the Academy's decision, but Roger Ebert defended the decision to award Crash Best Picture, arguing that the better film won. Proulx wrote an essay expressing disappointment in the film not winning Best Picture. She also opined that Philip Seymour Hoffman's performance in Capote required less effort than that required of the actors in Brokeback Mountain. Following the loss, more than 800 supporters raised up to $26,000 to place an advertisement in the Daily Variety. The advert thanked the filmmakers "for transforming countless lives through the most honored film of the year."

The film is one of several highly acclaimed LGBT-related films of 2005 to be nominated for critical awards; others include Breakfast on Pluto, Capote, Rent, and Transamerica. It was voted the top film involving homosexual relationships by readers at TheBacklot.com. In 2010, the Independent Film & Television Alliance selected the film as one of the 30 Most Significant Independent Films of the last 30 years.

In 2015, The Hollywood Reporter polled Academy members on controversial past decisions, in which Brokeback Mountain won the revote for Best Picture.

== Characters' sexuality ==
Critics and the cast and crew disagreed as to whether the film's two protagonists were homosexual, bisexual, heterosexual, or should be free of any sexual orientation classification. The film was frequently referred to in the media as the "gay cowboy movie", but a number of reviewers claimed that both Jack and Ennis were bisexual. Sex researcher Fritz Klein said that the film was "a nice film with two main characters who were bisexual" and suggested that the character of Jack is more "toward the gay side" of the spectrum and Ennis is "a bit more toward the straight side".

Gyllenhaal said in 2006 that Ennis and Jack were straight men who "develop this love, this bond," saying in a Details interview: "I approached the story believing that these are actually two straight guys who fall in love." However, in 2015, he told The Hollywood Reporter that this was a "gay love story", and that his character was the more "overtly gay" of the two. Ledger told Time magazine in 2005: "I don't think Ennis could be labeled as gay. Without Jack Twist, I don't know that he ever would have come out. I think the whole point was that it was two souls that fell in love with each other."

Others said they felt the characters' sexuality was meant to be ambiguous. Clarence Patton and Christopher Murray of New York's Gay City News wrote that Ennis and Jack's experiences were metaphors for "many men who do not identify as gay or even queer, but who nevertheless have sex with other men". Entertainment Weekly wrote that "everyone called it 'The Gay Cowboy Movie' until they saw it. In the end, Ang Lee's 2005 love story wasn't gay or straight, just human." Tom Ciorciari of EFilmCritic.com wrote: "We later see Jack eagerly engage Lureen sexually, with no explanation as to whether he is bisexual, so in need of physical intimacy that anyone, regardless of gender, will do, or merely very adept at faking it."

LGBTQ non-fiction author Eric Marcus dismissed "talk of Ennis and Jack being anything but gay as box office-influenced political correctness intended to steer straight audiences to the film". Roger Ebert believed that both characters were gay, but doubted it themselves: "Jack is able to accept a little more willingly that he is inescapably gay." Producer James Schamus said, "I suppose movies can be Rorschach tests for all of us, but damn if these characters aren't gay to me." Brokeback Mountain author Annie Proulx said, "how different readers take the story is a reflection of their own personal values, attitudes, hang-ups."

When Ledger and Gyllenhaal were asked if they feared being cast in controversial roles, Ledger stated that he was not afraid of the role, but rather he was concerned that he would not be mature enough as an actor to do the story justice. Gyllenhaal has stated that he is proud of the film and his role, regardless of what the reactions would be. He considered rumors of him being bisexual flattering, stating: "I'm open to whatever people want to call me. I've never really been attracted to men sexually, but I don't think I would be afraid of it if it happened." Lee described himself as shy upon shooting the first sex scene and initially found it technically difficult but praised Ledger and Gyllenhaal for their professionalism. Ledger's performance was described by Luke Davies as a difficult and empowering portrayal given the environment of the film: "In Brokeback Mountain the vulnerability, the potential for danger, is so great – a world so masculine it might destroy you for any aberration – that [Ledger's] real brilliance was to bring to the screen a character, Ennis Del Mar, so fundamentally shut down that he is like a bible of unrequited desires, stifled yearnings, lost potential."

Author Jim Kitses quoted Diana Ossana's acknowledgment of how the film "subverts the myth of the American West and its iconic heroes." He commented: "What drives the emotional attack of the film is the inadequacy of its characters to articulate and understand, let alone control, the experience that strikes them like a storm. American cowboys—of all people—have no business falling in love with each other. Practical and conservative types of a rough and ready manhood are by no means ready for man-love."

== Legacy and impact ==
Brokeback Mountain was lauded as a landmark in LGBTQ cinema and credited for influencing several films and television shows featuring LGBTQ themes and characters. In Out at the Movies, Steven Paul Davies explains that as a result of the film's success, "most major film studios have been clamouring to get behind new, gay-themed projects... thanks to Brokeback, film financiers will continue to back scripts that don't simply rely on gay stereotypes...and that will certainly be progress." Davies cites Milk, Transamerica, and I Love You Phillip Morris as examples of such films. In 2018, Brokeback Mountain was selected for preservation in the United States National Film Registry by the Library of Congress as being "culturally, historically, or aesthetically significant". The February 2020 issue of New York Magazine lists Brokeback Mountain as among "The Best Movies That Lost Best Picture at the Oscars." In 2021, members of Writers Guild of America West (WGAW) and Writers Guild of America, East (WGAE) ranked its screenplay 13th in WGA's 101 Greatest Screenplays of the 21st Century (so far).

The pair of shirts worn by Ledger's and Gyllenhaal's characters were sold on eBay on February 20, 2006, for US$101,100.51. The shirts were sold to benefit children's charity Variety. The buyer, Tom Gregory, film historian and collector, described the shirts as "the ruby slippers of our time", referring to an artifact from The Wizard of Oz film. In 2009, Gregory loaned the shirts to the Autry National Center in Los Angeles for its series, Out West, which explored the history of homosexual, bisexual and transgender people in the Old West. The series included a gallery tour, panel discussions, lectures and performances, with events held in four installments over the course of 12 months. According to the Autry, the series was the "first of its kind" for a western heritage museum.

A book, Beyond Brokeback: The Impact of a Film (2007), is a collection of personal stories of how people were influenced by the story and film, compiled from members of the Ultimate Brokeback Forum website. In an associated Out West series program, the Autry screened Brokeback Mountain in December 2010 to commemorate the film's fifth anniversary and held a staged reading of Beyond Brokeback by historian and Out West organizer Gregory Hinton. Beyond Brokeback has been presented as a staged reading at other venues, such as Roosevelt University in Chicago, on November 13, 2011, together with a panel discussion and screening of the film. An American opera, Brokeback Mountain, was composed by Charles Wuorinen with a libretto by Annie Proulx. Written in English, it premiered at the Teatro Real in Madrid on January 28, 2014. It was championed by impresario Gerard Mortier, who had commissioned it. A play, based on Annie Proulx's short story, written by Ashley Robinson with songs by Dan Gillespie Sells, opened on May 10, 2023, at @sohoplace in London's West End.

Several years after the film's release, Proulx said she regrets writing the story. She said that people have sent her too much fan fiction presenting alternative plots. Some authors, mostly men claiming to "understand men better than I do", often send their works. She said:

[The film] is the source of constant irritation in my private life. There are countless people out there who think the story is open range to explore their fantasies and to correct what they see as an unbearably disappointing story [...] They constantly send ghastly manuscripts and pornish rewrites of the story to me, expecting me to reply with praise and applause for "fixing" the story. They certainly don't get the message that if you can't fix it you've got to stand it. Most of these "fix-it" tales have the character Ennis finding a husky boyfriend and living happily ever after, or discovering the character Jack is not really dead after all, or having the two men's children meet and marry, etc., etc.

== See also ==
- List of LGBTQ-related films by storyline
- List of films considered the best
- List of LGBTQ Academy Award winners and nominees
- Mixed-orientation marriage, sometimes referred to as a "brokeback" marriage – Marriage between partners of differing sexual orientations
