= Morgan Jon Fox =

American film director and screenwriter

- Born: June 19, 1979 (age 47); Memphis, Tennessee, U.S.
- Occupations: Film director, film producer, screenwriter
- Years active: 2002–present

Morgan Jon Fox (born June 19, 1979) is an American film director and screenwriter from Memphis, Tennessee.

Named one of the "25 new faces of Independent Film” by Filmmaker Magazine, he has directed four feature films, Blue Citrus Hearts (2004, Ariztical Entertainment), Away Awake (2005, Ariztical Entertainment), OMG/HaHaHa (2009, Waterbearer Films), This Is What Love In Action Looks Like (2012, TLA Releasings), and the critically acclaimed episodic tv series Feral.

== Life and career ==
Fox attended White Station High School in Memphis, TN.

Fox began gaining indie film notoriety in his early 20s coming out of the Memphis film scene, which has produced filmmakers Craig Brewer, Ira Sachs, Mike McCarthy, and Kentucker Audley.

He formed the film collaborative, Sawed-Off Collaboratory Productions, in Memphis in 2002.

Fox made his directorial debut in 2003 with Blue Citrus Hearts. It became an underground hit on the film festival circuit, garnering high profile reviews:

"Fox and his shoestring Memphis film cooperative succeed in capturing the intensity of teen angst where many Hollywood films fail."

— Ronnie Scheib, Variety

The micro-budget film won Best Feature Film at the 2003 Chicago Lesbian and Gay Film Fest, Best Hometown Feature at the 2003 Indie Memphis Film Festival, Honorable Mention at the Berkley Video and Film Fest, and the Festival Director Award for the Advancement of Cinema at the 2004 Magnolia Film Fest. Blue Citrus Hearts was named one of the top 20 films of 2003 by The Chicago Reader and the Commercial Appeal. The film is distributed by American distribution company Ariztical Entertainment.

Ariztical Entertainment released Fox's second film, Away(A)Wake, in 2005. In 2009 his third feature, OMG/HaHaHa, premiered at NewFest in New York City. It won best of fest awards in Memphis and Chicago. The teen-to-early twenties centric film, with a main character who speaks to the viewing audience through his webcam, gained Fox the title "The voice of the youtube generation" by Filmmaker Magazine. The film is distributed by Waterbearer Films.

From 2005 through 2011, Fox directed a documentary in Memphis about a controversial ex-gay program, Love In Action, where a teenager named Zach Stark was being forced to enter by his parents after he told them he was gay. The documentary, This Is What Love In Action Looks Like, premiered in June 2011 at Frameline, the 35th Annual San Francisco International Lesbian and Gay Film Festival. On April 13, 2012, a follow-up story based on the events in the documentary was featured in a story on This American Life, which was titled Own Worst Enemy. Fox and Love In Action's director John Smid appeared on CNN to promote the film, which is distributed worldwide by TLA Releasing.

In September 2014, Morgan directed a new project, titled Feral. The 8-episode narrative series set in Memphis features the fictional lives of several queer artists in their early 20s. The series is an original content production for Dekkoo, a new platform owned by Derek Curl of TLA Releasing. The new company launched in 2016.

Fox was nominated as "Best Editor" at the 2nd Annual Streamy Awards in 2009 for Craig Brewer’s (Hustle & Flow) MTV web & tv series, $5 Cover.

== Filmography ==
=== TV ===
- Feral, Season 1 (2016) 8 Episodes

=== Feature films ===
- This Is What Love In Action Looks Like (2012)
- OMG/HaHaHa (2009)
- Away(A)Wake (2004)
- Blue Citrus Hearts (2003)

=== Short films ===
- Piggly Wiggly (2010)
- Chuck, From Craigslist (2009)
- Pig In A Poke (2008)
- Eel, Crab, Sparkleboy and his Brother (2006)
- Strawberry (2005)
- Octopus (2005)
- Experiment 16 (2002)
