= Garrard Conley =

American author and LGBTQ activist

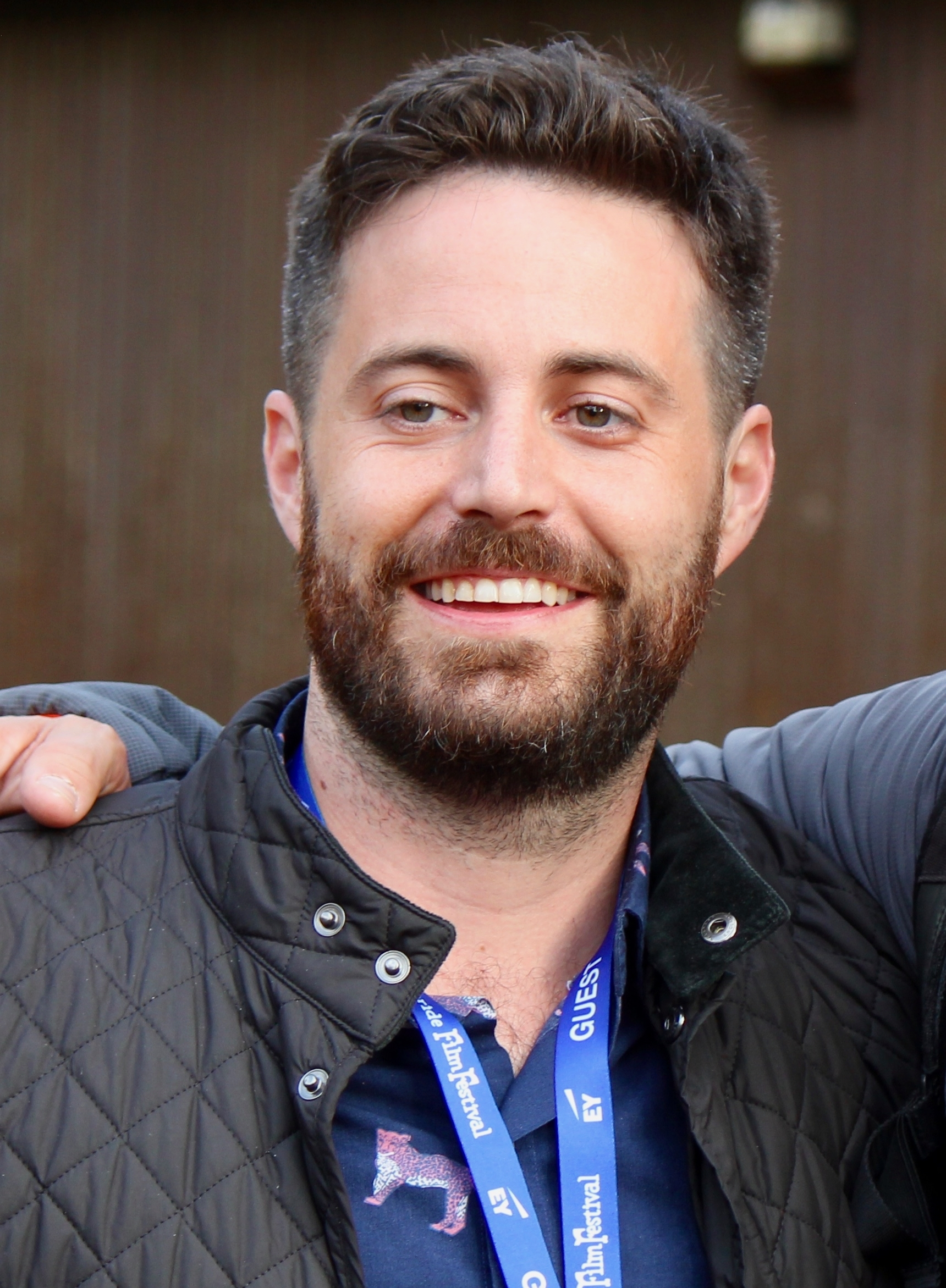
- Conley in 2018
- Born: 1984 or 1985 (age 41–42); United States
- Writing career
- Notable work: Boy Erased: A Memoir
- Website: garrardconley.com

Garrard Conley (born 1984 or 1985) is an American author and LGBTQ activist known for his autobiography Boy Erased: A Memoir, recounting his childhood as part of a fundamentalist family in Arkansas that enrolled him in conversion therapy. The book was adapted for the 2018 film, Boy Erased.

== Early life and education ==
Conley was raised first in Cherokee Village and then later in Mountain Home, Arkansas. His father is a Southern Baptist preacher and former car salesman. Garrard "spent years struggling to reconcile his sexuality with his faith". His family had a house on Lake Thunderbird in Norman, Oklahoma where Conley would spend time on their pontoon boat.

Conley attended Lyon College in Batesville, Arkansas for a semester before returning home after being outed to his parents by a student who had raped Conley. Conley was sent to Love in Action to undergo conversion therapy—the controversial pseudoscientific practice of trying to change someone's sexual orientation from homosexual to heterosexual using psychological or spiritual interventions—in 2004. At Love in Action, he underwent treatments by John Smid, who later left the organization, disavowed conversion therapy, announced he was still gay and stated he had "never met a man who experienced a change from homosexual to heterosexual."

Conley returned to Lyon College graduating in 2007. He went on to receive his MA in English from Auburn University in 2012 and an MFA from Brooklyn College’s fiction program in 2020, where he was a Truman Capote Fellow.

== Career ==
In 2016, Conley was teaching English literature at the American College of Sofia in Bulgaria. That year he published Boy Erased: A Memoir, based on his experiences at Love in Action. The book was later adapted into the 2018 film Boy Erased by Joel Edgerton, with Lucas Hedges playing Conley. He used his newfound fame to "educate the public about the abusive practice of conversion therapy". Conley released a four-episode podcast titled UnErased: The History of Conversion Therapy in America shortly before the release of the film. In 2018, Conley led GrubStreet's Memoir Incubator program. He has continued to travel worldwide telling his story: in 2019, he presented to Southern Utah University, Equality Utah, venues in Germany and Switzerland, and gave a keynote speech for Iowa Safe Schools.

In June 2019, to mark the 50th anniversary of the Stonewall riots, Queerty named him one of the Pride50 "trailblazing individuals who actively ensure society remains moving towards equality, acceptance and dignity for all queer people". Conley is an assistant professor of Creative Writing at Kennesaw State University in Atlanta.

== Personal life ==
Conley lives in New York City with his husband.

== Works ==
=== Novels ===
- All the World Beside (March 26, 2024), ISBN 9780525537359

=== Non-fiction ===
- Boy Erased: A Memoir, or Boy Erased: A Memoir of Identity, Faith, and Family (2016), memoir, ISBN 9781594633010
