= Brokeback Mountain (disambiguation) =

Brokeback Mountain is a 2005 American romantic drama film directed by Ang Lee.

Brokeback Mountain may also refer to:

- Brokeback Mountain (opera), by American composer Charles Wuorinen, 2014
- Brokeback Mountain (play), by Ashley Robinson, 2023
- Brokeback Mountain (short story), by American author Annie Proulx, 1997
