= This Is What Love in Action Looks Like =

- Theatrical release cover
- Directed by: Morgan Jon Fox
- Music by: Jonsi; Alan Hayes; Glorie
- Production companies: Sawed-Off Collaboratory Productions; Live From Memphis
- Distributed by: TLA Releasing
- Release date: June 2011
- Running time: 70 minutes
- Country: United States
- Language: English
- Budget: Unknown

This Is What Love in Action Looks Like is a 2011 American documentary film directed by Morgan Jon Fox about a Memphis teenager who was sent to a controversial Christian program after telling his parents that he was gay. The film premiered in 2011, and is distributed by TLA Releasing.

== Synopsis ==
In June 2005, a 16-year-old Tennessee boy, Zach Stark, posted a blog entry on his MySpace page, part of which included the following:

Somewhat recently, as many of you know, I told my parents I was gay... Well today, my mother, father, and I had a very long "talk" in my room where they let me know I am to apply for a fundamentalist christian program for gays. They tell me that there is something psychologically wrong with me, and they "raised me wrong." I'm a big screw up to them, who isn't on the path God wants me to be on. So I'm sitting here in tears, joing [sic] the rest of those kids who complain about their parents on blogs - and I can't help it.

Zach's parents were sending him to a controversial ex-gay program called Love In Action in Memphis. After friends of Zach, as well as several Memphis bloggers and activists became aware of his blog, an impassioned, nationwide protest began in support of the teen. As daily protests were staged outside the Love In Action campus, the controversy quickly became international news as the world counted down the days until the teen's release. The program's director, John Smid, believed that being gay was a choice, and that he himself was an ex-gay. The protestors outside, joined by former Love In Action clients, believed that the program was harmful. While Zach was still in the program, his father, Joe Stark, went on the Christian Broadcasting Network defending his decision.

The film covers a six year span, and features in depth interviews with Zach, protestors, former Love In Action clients, as well as the organization's Executive director, John Smid.

== Premiere and release ==
This Is What Love In Action Looks Like premiered in June 2011 at Frameline, the 35th Annual San Francisco International Lesbian and Gay Film Festival. A hit on the film festival circuit, it won Best Documentary awards at Indie Memphis, and Birmingham Shout. It was also honored with the Derek Oyston CHE Film Award 2012 at the 26th BFI London Lesbian and Gay Film Festival. Fox, and Love In Action's former director John Smid appeared on the CNN to promote the film the morning of its release on DVD and Digital platforms.

== Soundtrack ==
Title	Written by	Performed by	Label
Boy Lilikoi, Tornado (instrumental), Sinking Friendships (instrumental), Around Us (instrumental)	Jon Thor Birgisson	Jon Thor Birgisson (as Jonsi)	XL Recording/Universal Music Publishing
Lazy Day, Gunshot City, Full Circle, Water Drops	Jason Paxton	Glorie	Makeshift Music
Softy 1, Softy 2, Softy 3	W.C. Bevan	W.C. Bevan	W.C. Bevan
Baby Brother (Instrumental)	Brad Postlethwaite	Brad Postlethwaite	Makeshift Music
Your Ambient Voice	Chris and Richard Adams	Hood	Domino Records
Featherlands, Transcend, Precedent, Transition, Resolution	Alan Hayes	Alan Hayes	The House of Hayes

== Follow-up ==
On April 13, 2012, a follow-up based on the events in the documentary was featured in a story on This American Life titled Own Worst Enemy. In the podcast the film's director, Morgan Jon Fox and Love In Action's now former director, John Smid, talk about meeting as enemies, and becoming friends over time.
