= Ennis Del Mar =

Character from Brokeback Mountain

- Ennis Del Mar as portrayed by Heath Ledger
- First appearance: "Brokeback Mountain"
- Created by: Annie Proulx
- Portrayed by: Heath Ledger (film); Lucas Hedges (play)

In-universe information
- Gender: Male
- Occupation: Sheep herder, ranch hand
- Spouse: Alma Beers
- Children: Alma Jr. Jenny (Francine in short story)
- Relatives: K.E. (brother); Unnamed sister

Ennis Del Mar (Note: spelled "del Mar" in the written story and "Del Mar" in the film's credits) is the fictional main character of the short story Brokeback Mountain by Annie Proulx, the 2005 Academy Award-winning film adaptation of the same name directed by Ang Lee, and the 2023 play by Ashley Robinson also adapted from the short story. Ennis's story is depicted by his complex sexual and romantic relationship with Jack Twist in the American West, over two decades from 1963 to 1983. In the film, he is portrayed by Heath Ledger, who won the New York Film Critics Circle Award for Best Actor and the Best International Actor Award from the Australian Film Institute and was nominated for the Academy Award for Best Actor, BAFTA Award for Best Actor, Screen Actors Guild Award for Best Actor and Golden Globe Award for Best Actor – Motion Picture Drama for his performance. In the world premiere of the play in the West End, he is portrayed by Lucas Hedges.

"Ennis Del Mar" literally translates as "Island of the Sea": Ennis is a corruption of the Irish word inis for "island" and the phrase del mar is Spanish for "of the sea".

== Characterization ==
In an interview about her work, and "Brokeback Mountain" in particular, Proulx stated Ennis Del Mar was a "confused Wyoming ranch kid" who finds himself in a personal sexual situation he did not foresee, nor can understand. She said both men were "beguiled by the cowboy myth," and "Ennis tries to be one but never gets beyond ranch hand work." Ennis is also the more closed-down party of his and Jack's relationship, being more reluctant to show affection towards Jack. When Jack brings up suggestions about them living together, or even just Ennis moving to Texas, which is his home state, Ennis always declines, sometimes in a very harsh way.

=== Sexual orientation ===
One mystery surrounding Ennis Del Mar (as well as Jack Twist) is his sexual orientation. He has sexual and emotional relationships, of varying and fluctuating degrees, with Jack, his wife Alma, and his girlfriend Cassie.

Some film critics identified Ennis as bisexual rather than strictly homosexual. Sex researcher Fritz Klein stated he felt Ennis to be "a bit more toward the straight side of being bisexual." Ledger himself was quoted as stating in Time: "I don't think Ennis could be labeled as gay. Without Jack Twist, I don't know that he ever would have come out... I think the whole point was that it was two souls that fell in love with each other." The film's producer James Schamus and LGBT-related non-fiction author Eric Marcus opined that the characters were both gay.

Novelist Brent Hartinger analysed some of the discussion about the sexual orientations of the characters, writing for AfterElton.com. Hartinger personally "felt it inconceivable" that the characters could be considered bisexual and not gay because the film consistently showed their dissatisfaction with their heterosexual partners and deep emotional and physical fulfilment with one another. What's more, Del Mar insisted on anal sex with his wife, and Twist sought out other males for sex outside of his marriage when Del Mar wasn't available. Hartinger puts down efforts to describe the characters as bisexual to a mixture of bisexuals who misunderstand "what it means to be gay" and some who rightfully feel starved of media representations of bisexuality. For Hartinger, the actors' opinions of "straight guys who just happened to fall in love" seem to come more from Gyllenhaal and Ledger's acting method rather than an assessment of the text. Hartinger ended the discussion with a quotation from Annie Proulx, on the subject of her short story, to illuminate the ways in which different people interpret the sexualities of the main characters:

How different readers take the story is a reflection of their own personal values, attitudes, hang-ups... It is my feeling that a story is not finished until it is read, and that the reader finishes it through his or her life experience, prejudices, world view and thoughts.

== Plot summary ==
Ennis is born in about 1943 or 1944, the youngest of three children, and grows up near Sage, in southwestern Wyoming. He is orphaned at a young age, and forced to drop out of school not long afterwards. While on a 1963 shepherding job on Brokeback Mountain in Wyoming, Ennis meets and falls in love with rodeo cowboy Jack Twist.

While the two 19-year-old men work on Brokeback Mountain, Ennis is stationed at the base camp while Jack watches the sheep higher on the mountain. They meet only for meals at the base camp, gradually becoming friends. Eventually they switch roles, with Jack taking over duties at base camp and Ennis tending the flock. One night after the two share a bottle of whiskey, Ennis decides to remain at the base camp overnight instead of returning to the sheep, too drunk to get back up the mountain alone. The weather becomes bitterly cold that night, but Ennis is reluctant to sleep in the same tent as Jack, who insists he join him. That night the men share a brief, intense sexual encounter. During the summer, their sexual and emotional relationship deepens.

After the job is finished the two part ways. Ennis marries his fiancée Alma Beers in November 1963 and starts a family, having two daughters, Alma Jr. and Jenny (named Francine in the short story). Four years later, Ennis receives a postcard from Jack asking if he wants to meet. The men reunite and their passion rekindles. Jack broaches the subject of creating a life together. Unwilling to leave his family and haunted by a childhood memory of the murder of a suspected homosexual couple in his hometown, Ennis fears that such an arrangement can only end in tragedy. Unable to be open about their relationship, Ennis and Jack settle for infrequent meetings on camping trips.

Over time Ennis' marriage deteriorates. Alma knows about his relationship with Jack, having seen the two men kissing upon their reunion. In 1975 Alma divorces Ennis, taking custody of their two daughters and marrying her former employer. Jack hopes Ennis' divorce will allow them to live together, but Ennis refuses to move away from his children and remains uncomfortable with the idea of living with a man. Ennis dates an outgoing and vivacious waitress, Cassie Cartwright. The relationship fails when Ennis spontaneously stops communicating with her. On a 1983 trip with Jack, Ennis insists that to keep his job, he cannot meet with Jack again before November. Ennis and Jack's frustrations finally erupt into an argument, the struggle becoming a desperate embrace. The two men part upset.

Months later, a postcard Ennis sent to Jack is returned to the post office, stamped "deceased". During a phonecall, Jack's wife Lureen tells Ennis that Jack died in a freak accident while changing a tire. While she explains what happened, Ennis imagines Jack being beaten to death by a group of men wielding tire-irons. Lureen tells Ennis that Jack wished to have his ashes scattered on Brokeback Mountain. She suggests that Ennis contact Jack's parents.

Ennis visits Jack's parents and offers to take Jack's ashes to Brokeback Mountain. Jack's father insists that Jack's remains be buried in the family plot. He also tells Ennis that Jack wanted to bring another man back to his parents' ranch so they could revitalize the ranch. Jack's mother invites Ennis to see Jack's bedroom, which she has maintained "...the same way as when he was a boy" believing that Jack preferred it thus. While in the room, Ennis discovers two shirts hidden in a narrow slat of the closet. The shirts, hung one inside the other on the same hanger, are the ones the two men were wearing on their last day on Brokeback Mountain in 1963, with Ennis' shirt inside Jack's. Ennis, believing his own shirt forgotten on the mountain, finds the shirts together especially poignant and takes the shirts with him; Jack's mother offers Ennis a paper sack to put the now rolled-up shirts in.

Alma Jr. visits Ennis at his home, a trailer by the highway. She is preparing to marry and asks for her father's blessing. Though initially reluctant to attend the wedding, Ennis agrees. Ennis asks if her fiancé loves her and she affirms that he does.

After Alma Jr. leaves, Ennis finds the sweater that Alma was wearing and had accidentally forgotten. Opening his closet to hang Alma's sweater, it is revealed that Ennis has hung the shirts from Jack's bedroom inside the door beside a postcard of Brokeback Mountain, with the order now reversed to show Jack's shirt on the inside. With tears in his eyes, Ennis mutters, "Jack, I swear ..."

== Reception ==
Ledger's performance as Ennis Del Mar in Brokeback Mountain earned him nominations for an Academy Award, a BAFTA Award, a Golden Globe Award, and a Screen Actors Guild Award, all for Best Actor in a Leading Role. In addition, Ledger received recognition from several North American critics' associations, winning the 2005 Las Vegas Film Critics Society, New York Film Critics Circle, Phoenix Film Critics Society, and San Francisco Film Critics Circle awards, as Best Actor.

== See also ==
- List of LGBT characters in modern written fiction
