= Restoration Path =

Former Christian-based ex-gay organization

Restoration Path, known as Love in Action (LIA) until March 2012, was an American ex-gay Christian ministry founded in 1973. Founded by Frank Worthen, John Evans, and Baptist pastor Kent Philpott in Marin County, California. As of October 2019, the organization has since been dissolved.

== History ==
The organization was founded in 1973 by Worthen (1929–2017), Evans, and Philpott in Marin County, California, just north of San Francisco. In 2010, Tommy Corman became the executive director of Love In Action, which was now based in Bartlett, Tennessee. In March 2012, the group changed its name to Restoration Path, with Corman citing the support from and referrals from mission organizations like the American Baptist International Mission Board. Corman wrote in the March newsletter:

"We have been sharing with you the necessary transition changes over the last few months with our new online workshops. The Board of Directors are encouraged as well to see our new name change. I hope you will continue to partner with this much needed ministry that unashamedly ministers to sexually broken individuals from a Biblical perspective. I have seen many hearts changed and God work in a mighty way through this staff and mission. This name change and the new website, restorationpath.org, has already given us the boost we need to move ahead."

In October 2012, David Jones, who is trained in sexual addiction, became the executive director; as of August 2018, he remained the executive director.

On July 5, 2007, Love in Action announced the initiation of Family Freedom Intensive, a monthly four-day program for parents with teens "struggling with same-sex attraction, pornography, and/or promiscuity." Teenagers who they would like to join their parents may be considered for inclusion. As of 2018, there is no mention of this program on the Restoration Path website. After Jack McIntyre, a friend of co-founder John Evans, died by suicide because of his inability to change, Evans left Love in Action and denounced it as dangerous.

As of October 2019, both the organization's website and Facebook page were offline. According to the California Secretary of State, the organization has been dissolved.

== Controversies ==
=== Leadership renunciations ===
After Jack McIntyre, a friend of co-founder John Evans, died by suicide because of his inability to change, Evans left Love in Action and denounced it as dangerous. He said: "They're destroying people's lives. If you don't do their thing, you're not of God, you'll go to hell. They're living in a fantasy world."

John Smid recounts becoming a Christian in 1982. He found that his religious conviction was incompatible with his homosexuality. He entered into a relationship with a woman and married. In 1986 he joined the leadership of Love In Action, eventually becoming executive director. Smid left LIA in 2008. In 2011, on his website, he stated that homosexuality is an intrinsic part of one's being, and that "change, repentance, reorientation and such" cannot occur, and noted that he had "never met a man who experienced a change from homosexual to heterosexual". On November 16 2014, John Smid married his same-sex partner, Larry McQueen.

=== Zach Stark ===
In June 2005, a 16-year-old Tennessee boy, Zach Stark, posted a blog entry on his MySpace site, part of which stated:

Somewhat recently, as many of you know, I told my parents I was gay.... Well today, my mother, father, and I had a very long "talk" in my room where they let me know I am to apply for a fundamentalist christian program for gays. They tell me that there is something psychologically wrong with me, and they "raised me wrong." I'm a big screw up to them, who isn't on the path God wants me to be on. So I'm sitting here in tears, joing [sic] the rest of those kids who complain about their parents on blogs - and I can't help it.

The program Stark noted was a Love In Action-run camp known as Refuge. On August 14, Stark updated his blog, stating that LIA had not pressured him into doing anything and that he got along well with most of the clients there. He said his parents no longer let him hang out with girls as friends because it was unhealthy and that his father had asked him to stop blogging. Stark has since accepted his homosexuality, and appears in the documentary by director Morgan Jon Fox, entitled This Is What Love In Action Looks Like, which features an exclusive interview with Stark about the controversy.

A Tennessee investigation against the camp began shortly after Stark's story appeared online. As of June 28, 2005, the investigation was dropped, with Tennessee officials citing a lack of evidence of child abuse at the facilities. "Department of Children's Services dispatched its special investigations unit to the facility, and after conducting a full investigation, determined that the child abuse allegations were unfounded", Rob Johnson, an agency spokesman, told the Associated Press. On September 12, 2005, the Tennessee-based Love in Action facility was determined by the Tennessee Department of Mental Health to have been operating two "unlicensed mental health supportive living facilities." LIA stopped accepting the mentally ill and dispensing medications and, in February 2006, the state of Tennessee stopped legal action.

In 2005, Tommy Corman, the spokesman for Love In Action, said the facility did not need to be licensed because it was "not doing anything therapeutic". The organization sued the state of Tennessee for discrimination against the facility. The suit was settled on October 27, 2006. The state agreed that Love in Action would not need licensing as a mental health facility, and LIA agreed to make sure none of its employees administered or regulated the medication of its clients. The state of Tennessee was told to pay Love in Action's legal fees.

In June 2007, LIA discontinued the Refuge program.

== In the media ==
The 2012 book The Miseducation of Cameron Post, the debut novel of American author Emily M. Danforth, was inspired by the Stark controversy. The book was adapted as a 2018 film with the same name starring Chloë Grace Moretz. The film was shown at the Sundance Film Festival, on January 22, 2018, where it won the U.S. Grand Jury Prize.

Garrard Conley describes his experiences in the Memphis chapter of the program in his 2016 book Boy Erased: A Memoir. The book was adapted in 2018 as Boy Erased, a film directed by Joel Edgerton starring Lucas Hedges.
