= The Poor & Hungry =

- Directed by: Craig Brewer
- Written by: Craig Brewer
- Produced by: Craig Brewer; Jodi Brewer; Walter Brewer; Erin Hagee
- Starring: Eric Tate; Lake Latimer; Lindsey Roberts
- Narrated by: Eric Tate
- Cinematography: Craig Brewer
- Edited by: Craig Brewer; Morgan Jon Fox (remastering editor)
- Distributed by: BR2 Productions
- Release date: August 4, 2000 (Hollywood Film Festival)
- Running time: 108 minutes
- Country: United States
- Language: English
- Budget: $20,000

The Poor & Hungry is a 2000 American independent drama written and directed by Craig Brewer. It stars Eric Tate, Lake Latimer, Lindsay Roberts, John Still, T.C. Sharpe and Wanda Wilson.

The film, shot in Memphis, Tennessee, launched Brewer's career as a writer and director. Brewer used the experience of making the film as inspiration for the story in the Academy Award-winning Hustle & Flow.

== Plot ==
Car mechanic by day/thief by night, Eli Foote is starting to feel guilty about what he does. His guilt intensifies when he steals a car that belongs to a beautiful cellist named Amanda. Meeting her at the impound yard where she is distraught over her car, Eli strikes up a conversation with Amanda which leads to a romance. Meanwhile, Eli's friend, Harper, a grungy street hustler, is trying to do business with Eli's boss, Mr. Coles. She needs his help in getting a car for a boisterous pimp named Cowboy Urles. Eli wants to leave his criminal past behind, but Harper holds him to their friendship.

== Cast ==
- Eric Tate as Eli Foote
- Lindsay Roberts as Harper
- Lake Latimer as Amanda Russell
- John Still as Mr. Coles
- Keenon Nikita as Archie
- Dennis Phillippi as Bobo
- T.C. Sharpe as Cowboy Urles
- Jay Munn as Preacher
- Wanda Wilson as Miss Wanda
- Karl Chambless as Beale Street Tourist
- J. Lazarus Hawk as Dealer

== Production ==
Craig Brewer was inspired to write the film after his assistant Erin Hagee's car was stolen. Seeing her crying at the impound lot got him thinking, "What if the guy who stole her car was right here, watching her cry?" Brewer had been working as the manager of a local Barnes & Noble and began writing the screenplay for the film at the P&H Café. When he asked what the P&H stood for, he was told it stood for many things but it was generally accepted that it was called "The Poor & Hungry Café". Brewer asked if he could use the title for the film.

As he was writing the script, Brewer planned to max-out credit cards and shoot the film on celluloid. His father, Walter, suggested it would be cheaper to film on a Hi8 video camera. Weeks later, Brewer's father died from a heart attack at the age of 49. Brewer used his inheritance of $20,000 to begin working on The Poor & Hungry. A dedication at the end of the film shows a picture of Brewer's father with the caption "in loving memory of Walter Brewer 1949 - 1998".

== Music ==
The soundtrack features the music of The Delta Queens, DDT, Riverbluff Clan, Microwave Dave & The Nukes, Jack Oblivian, Blind Mississippi Morris, Al Kapone and Jason Freeman.

== Critical reception ==
According to Film Threat, The Poor & Hungry is "a ruggedly moving digital feature; an unlikely love story with a gritty, vaguely melancholic air". In 2013, Jared Mobarak of The Film Stage wrote Poor & Hungry "foreshadows everything [Brewer] has done since whether it be Hustle‘s sympathetically misunderstood lead, an ability to find the perfect music to authentically enhance his visuals a la Black Snake Moan, or show the love he has for Memphis’ culture most epitomized with his MTV web series $5 Cover."

== Awards and nominations ==
Hollywood Film Festival

- Best Digital Feature: Craig Brewer (Winner)

Magnolia Independent Film Festival

- Best Feature Film: Craig Brewer (Winner)

Nashville Film Festival

- Audience Choice Award: Craig Brewer (Winner)
- Dreammaker Award: Craig Brewer (Winner)
- Special Award of Merit: Craig Brewer (Winner)

== Home media ==
In its initial release, The Poor & Hungry was only available on VHS in Memphis at a local video store, Black Lodge Video. However, all the copies were eventually stolen from the store. The television rights were sold to the Independent Film Channel. 13 years later, Brewer gave the film a Blu-ray/DVD release after pent-up demand on November 15, 2013, and announced that anyone who wanted a digital copy of the film could get one for free via email.

The Blu-ray, remastered to high definition frame-by-frame, includes a commentary by Brewer, deleted scenes and a newly produced documentary Poor Man's Process: The Making of The Poor & Hungry, directed by Morgan Jon Fox and featuring interviews with Brewer, the cast and crew, John Singleton and Stephanie Allain.
