= List of awards and nominations received by Lucas Hedges =

Lucas Hedges awards and nominations
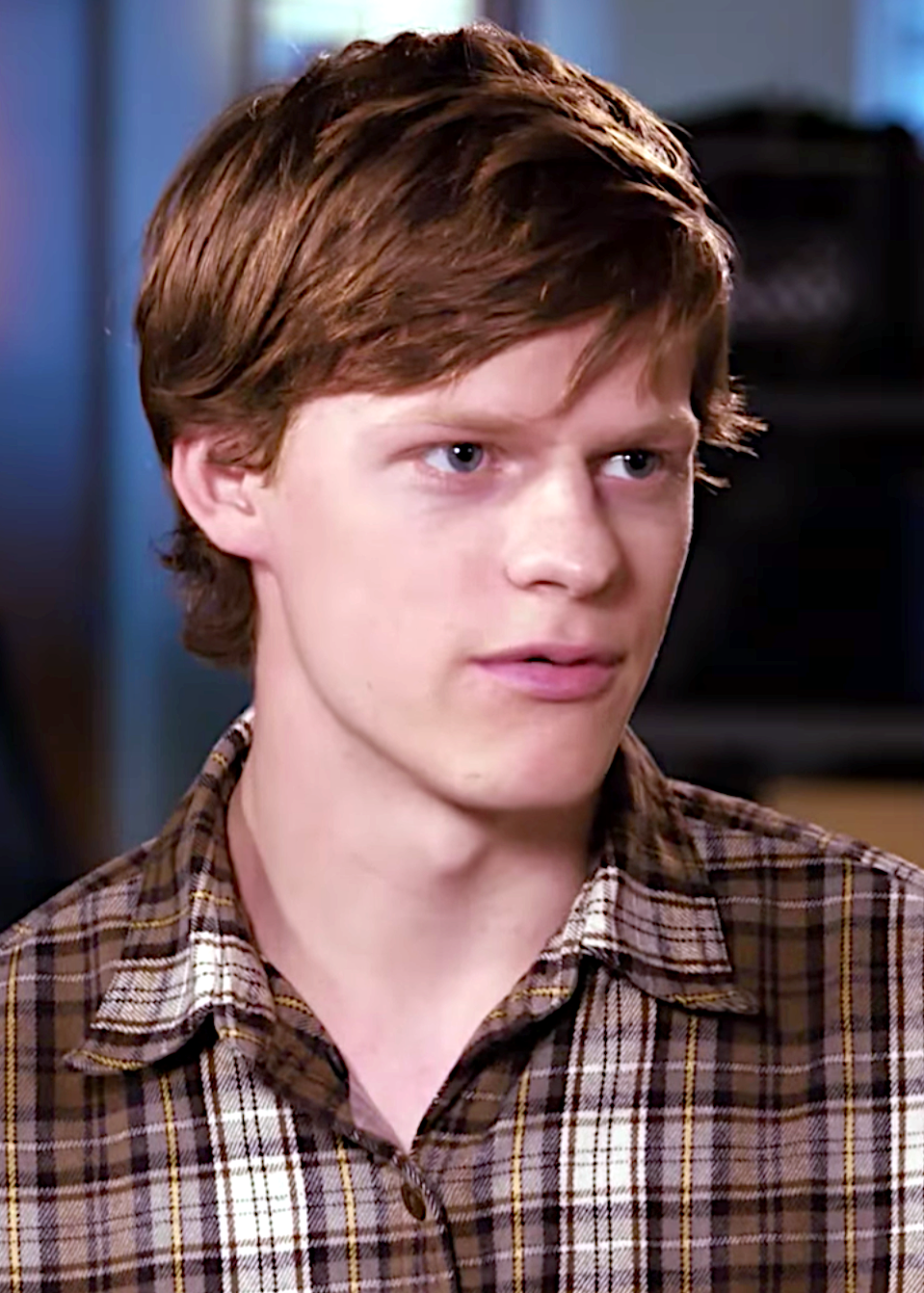
- Hedges in 2017
Awards and nominations
Award	Wins	Nominations
Academy Awards	0	1
British Academy of Film and Television Arts Awards	0	1
Golden Globe Awards	0	1
Screen Actors Guild Awards	1	4

Totals (Note: Certain award groups do not simply award one winner. They acknowledge several different recipients, have runners-up, and have third place. Since this is a specific recognition and is different from losing an award, runner-up mentions are considered wins in this award tally. For simplification and to avoid errors, each award in this list has been presumed to have had a prior nomination.)
- Wins: 11
- Nominations: 54

The following is a list of awards and nominations received by American actor Lucas Hedges. He is known for his roles in the films Moonrise Kingdom (2012), Kill the Messenger (2014), and Manchester by the Sea (2016), which earned him many awards and nominations, including an Academy Award for Best Supporting Actor and a Screen Actors Guild Award for Outstanding Performance by a Male Actor in a Supporting Role.

== Major Industry Awards ==
=== Academy Awards ===
Year	Nominated work	Category	Result
2017	Manchester by the Sea	Best Supporting Actor	Nominated

=== BAFTA Awards ===
Year	Nominated work	Category	Result
British Academy Film Awards
2017	—	Rising Star Award	Nominated

=== Golden Globe Awards ===
Year	Nominated work	Category	Result
2019	Boy Erased	Best Actor – Motion Picture Drama	Nominated

=== Screen Actors Guild Awards ===
Year	Nominated work	Category	Result
2017	Manchester by the Sea	Outstanding Performance by a Male Actor in a Supporting Role	Nominated
2017	Manchester by the Sea	Outstanding Performance by a Cast in a Motion Picture	Nominated (Note: Shared with the cast.)
2018	Lady Bird	Outstanding Performance by a Cast in a Motion Picture	Nominated
2018	Three Billboards Outside Ebbing, Missouri	Outstanding Performance by a Cast in a Motion Picture	Won

== Other Industry Awards ==
=== Alliance of Women Film Journalists Awards ===
Year	Nominated work	Category	Result
2017	Manchester by the Sea	Best Actor in a Supporting Role	Nominated

=== Australian Academy of Cinema and Television Arts Awards ===
Year	Nominated work	Category	Result
2017	Manchester by the Sea	Best International Supporting Actor – Cinema	Nominated
2018	Boy Erased	Best Lead Actor – Cinema	Nominated

=== Chicago Film Critics Association Awards ===
Year	Nominated work	Category	Result
2016	Manchester by the Sea	Most Promising Performer	Won
2016	Manchester by the Sea	Best Supporting Actor	Nominated

=== Critics' Choice Movie Awards ===
Year	Nominated work	Category	Result
2016	Manchester by the Sea	Best Supporting Actor	Nominated
2016	Manchester by the Sea	Best Young Actor	Won
2016	Manchester by the Sea	Best Acting Ensemble	Nominated
2017	Three Billboards Outside Ebbing, Missouri	Best Acting Ensemble	Won
2017	Lady Bird	Best Acting Ensemble	Nominated

=== Dallas–Fort Worth Film Critics Association Awards ===
Year	Nominated work	Category	Result
2016	Manchester by the Sea	Best Supporting Actor	Nominated

=== Detroit Film Critics Society Awards ===
Year	Nominated work	Category	Result
2016	Manchester by the Sea	Best Supporting Actor	Nominated
2016	Manchester by the Sea	Breakthrough Artist	Nominated
2016	Manchester by the Sea	Best Ensemble	Nominated
2017	Lady Bird	Best Ensemble	Nominated
2017	Three Billboards Outside Ebbing, Missouri	Best Ensemble	Nominated

=== Florida Film Critics Circle Awards ===
Year	Nominated work	Category	Result
2016	Manchester by the Sea	Breakout Award	Nominated
2016	Manchester by the Sea	Best Ensemble	Nominated
2017	Lady Bird	Best Ensemble	Nominated
2017	Three Billboards Outside Ebbing, Missouri	Best Ensemble	Won

=== Georgia Film Critics Association Awards ===
Year	Nominated work	Category	Result
2016	Manchester by the Sea	Best Breakout Actor	Nominated
2016	Manchester by the Sea	Best Supporting Actor	Nominated
2016	Manchester by the Sea	Best Cast	Nominated
2017	Lady Bird	Best Cast	Nominated
2017	Three Billboards Outside Ebbing, Missouri	Best Cast	Won

=== Gotham Awards ===
Year	Nominated work	Category	Result
2016	Manchester by the Sea	Breakthrough Actor	Nominated

=== Houston Film Critics Society Awards ===
Year	Nominated work	Category	Result
2017	Manchester by the Sea	Best Supporting Actor	Nominated

=== Independent Spirit Awards ===
Year	Nominated work	Category	Result
2017	Manchester by the Sea	Best Supporting Male	Nominated

=== Lucille Lortel Awards ===
Year	Nominated work	Category	Result
2017	Yen	Outstanding Leading Actor in a Play	Nominated

=== National Board of Review Awards ===
Year	Nominated work	Category	Result
2016	Manchester by the Sea	Best Breakthrough Male Performance	Won

=== Online Film Critics Society Awards ===
Year	Nominated work	Category	Result
2016	Manchester by the Sea	Best Supporting Actor	Nominated
2017	Lady Bird	Best Ensemble	Nominated
2017	Three Billboards Outside Ebbing, Missouri	Best Ensemble	Won

=== San Diego Film Critics Society Awards ===
Year	Nominated work	Category	Result
2016	Manchester by the Sea	Best Breakthrough Artist	Nominated
2017	Lady Bird	Best Ensemble Cast	Nominated
2017	Three Billboards Outside Ebbing, Missouri	Best Ensemble Cast	Nominated
2018	Boy Erased	Best Male Actor	Nominated

=== Satellite Awards ===
Year	Nominated work	Category	Result
2017	Manchester by the Sea	Best Supporting Actor in a Motion Picture	Nominated
2019	Boy Erased	Best Actor in a Motion Picture	Nominated

=== Seattle Film Critics Society Awards ===
Year	Nominated work	Category	Result
2016	Manchester by the Sea	Best Actor in a Supporting Role	Nominated
2016	Manchester by the Sea	Best Cast	Nominated
2017	Lady Bird	Best Cast	Nominated
2017	Three Billboards Outside Ebbing, Missouri	Best Cast	Nominated

=== St. Louis Gateway Film Critics Association Awards ===
Year	Nominated work	Category	Result
2016	Manchester by the Sea	Best Supporting Actor	Nominated

=== Theatre World Awards ===
Year	Nominated work	Category	Result
2017	Yen	Outstanding Off-Broadway Debut Performance	Won

=== Vancouver Film Critics Circle Awards ===
Year	Nominated work	Category	Result
2016	Manchester by the Sea	Best Supporting Actor	Nominated

=== Washington D.C. Area Film Critics Association Awards ===
Year	Nominated work	Category	Result
2016	Manchester by the Sea	Best Youth Performance	Won
2016	Manchester by the Sea	Best Supporting Actor	Nominated
2016	Manchester by the Sea	Best Ensemble	Nominated
2017	Three Billboards Outside Ebbing, Missouri	Best Ensemble	Won

=== Women Film Critics Circle Awards ===
Year	Nominated work	Category	Result
2014	Kill the Messenger	Best Male Images in a Movie	Nominated
