= Jack Twist =

Character from Brokeback Mountain

- Jack Twist as portrayed by Jake Gyllenhaal in Brokeback Mountain (2005)
- First appearance: "Brokeback Mountain"
- Created by: Annie Proulx
- Portrayed by: Jake Gyllenhaal (movie); Mike Faist (play)

Jack Twist is a fictional character in the short story "Brokeback Mountain" by Annie Proulx, the 2005 Academy Award-winning film adaptation of the same name directed by Ang Lee, and the 2023 play by Ashley Robinson also adapted from the short story. In the film, he is portrayed by American actor Jake Gyllenhaal, who received a BAFTA Award for Best Supporting Actor and was nominated for the Academy Award for Best Supporting Actor and Screen Actors Guild Award for Best Supporting Actor for his performance. Jack's story primarily follows the complex sexual and romantic relationship he has with Ennis Del Mar in the American West from 1963 to 1983.

== Characterization ==
In an interview about her work, and "Brokeback Mountain" in particular, author Proulx stated that Jack Twist is a "confused Wyoming ranch kid" who finds himself in a personal dilemma he did not foresee, nor can understand. She said both men were "beguiled by the cowboy myth", and Jack "settles on rodeo as an expression of the Western ideal. It more or less works for him until he becomes a tractor salesman." Jack is also more romantic than Ennis, being the one who pursues the relationship and insists that they should live together officially. He is open about his desires and discontents, which is also shown in the novella, when he tries to open his wife Lureen Newsome's eyes about their son's dyslexia even though he knows that he has no say in the matter, since she holds the money in the family.

=== Sexual orientation ===
One mystery surrounding Jack Twist (as well as Ennis Del Mar) is his sexual orientation. He has a sexual and emotional relationship with Lureen, but he still shows more sexual desire towards men in general than Ennis, who has no relations with men other than Jack. Jack sleeps with other men, including male prostitutes. While meeting Ennis in the mountains for the very last time, Jack says he is having an extramarital relationship with a woman; however, it is likely that the woman, the "ranch foreman's wife", is actually the ranch foreman himself, as in a previous scene, he invites Jack to a cabin to "do a little fishing and drink some whisky". In a later scene, Jack's father mentions to Ennis that Jack had revealed a plan before he died to come up with a male friend to the family ranch and live there.

Some film critics suggest Jack is bisexual rather than strictly homosexual. Sex researcher Fritz Klein stated he felt Jack to be more "toward the gay side of bisexuality." Gyllenhaal himself took the opinion that Ennis and Jack were heterosexual men who "develop this love, this bond", also saying in a Details interview: "I approached the story believing that these are actually two straight guys who fall in love." The film's producer James Schamus and LGBT non-fiction author Eric Marcus opined that the characters were both gay.

Interestingly, the story's fame has made Annie Proulx a bit unhappy. She has vehemently been an opposer of fan-written stories that attempt to provide a happier ending for her characters. According to the author, the love story's tragedy makes it realistic. For the writer, a different story would drastically change who the characters are meant to be. That said, Proulx does not seem to have any issues with the movie itself and adores the work done by Ledger and Gyllenhaal.

Novelist Brent Hartinger analyzed some of the discussion about the sexual orientations of the characters, writing for AfterElton.com. Hartinger personally "felt it inconceivable" that the characters could be considered bisexual and not gay because the film consistently showed their dissatisfaction with their heterosexual partners and deep emotional and physical fulfillment with one another. Hartinger added that Del Mar insists on anal sex with his wife, and Twist seeks out other males for sex outside of his marriage when Del Mar is not available. Hartinger puts down efforts to describe the characters as bisexual to a mixture of bisexuals who misunderstand "what it means to be gay" and some who rightfully feel starved of media representations of bisexuality. For Hartinger, the actors' opinions of "straight guys who just happened to fall in love" seems to come more from Gyllenhaal and Ledger's acting method rather than an assessment of the text. Hartinger ended the discussion with a quotation from Proulx, on the subject of her short story, to illuminate the ways in which different people interpret the sexualities of the main characters:

How different readers take the story is a reflection of their own personal values, attitudes, hang-ups... It is my feeling that a story is not finished until it is read, and that the reader finishes it through his or her life experience, prejudices, world view and thoughts.

== Fictional character history ==
Jack is born around 1943 or 1944 and grows up in Lightning Flat, Wyoming. He spends his youth in the northeastern corner of the state and eventually drops out of high school. In 1963, while working as a rodeo cowboy on Brokeback Mountain, Wyoming, Jack encounters Ennis Del Mar, a ranch hand portrayed by Heath Ledger in the film adaptation.

Initially, Jack and Ennis, both 19, work together on Brokeback Mountain, with Ennis stationed at the base camp and Jack watching over the sheep higher up the mountain. Their friendship gradually develops during shared meals at the base camp. As their duties switch, Jack takes over at the base camp, and Ennis tends to the flock. One night, after sharing whiskey, Ennis decides to stay overnight at the base camp due to cold weather. Jack invites him into the tent to warm up, leading to a significant and intense sexual encounter. Throughout the summer, their emotional and physical connection deepens.

Upon completing their job, Jack attempts to return to Brokeback Mountain, but his previous employer, witnessing Jack and Ennis in a sexual encounter, refuses to rehire him. Jack moves to Texas, marries Lureen Newsome (played by Anne Hathaway), and has a son named Bobby with her.

Four years later, Jack contacts Ennis through a postcard, leading to a passionate reunion. Jack proposes building a life together on a small ranch, but Ennis, fearing societal consequences, hesitates. They settle for infrequent meetings on mountain camping trips. Ennis' marriage ends in divorce, offering hope for Jack and Ennis to live together. However, Ennis continues to resist moving away from his children and is uneasy about openly living with another man.

In 1983, during a mountain trip, Jack discovers that Ennis cannot meet before November due to work obligations. Frustrations boil over into a bitter argument and physical struggle. The men part on tense terms. Months later, Ennis learns of Jack's death, allegedly in a tire-changing accident, but suspects foul play due to their secret relationship.

Lureen informs Ennis of Jack's wish to have his ashes scattered on Brokeback Mountain. Ennis visits Jack's parents in Wyoming, and while Jack's father refuses to allow the ashes to be taken to Brokeback, his mother is more receptive. In Jack's boyhood bedroom, Ennis finds two shirts hidden in the closet—the shirts they wore on their last day on Brokeback in 1963. Ennis takes the shirts, and Jack's mother provides a paper sack.

In the story's conclusion, Ennis hangs the two shirts in his closet, one inside the other, with his plaid shirt embracing Jack's blue one. Beneath a postcard of Brokeback Mountain, Ennis buttons the top of Jack's shirt, tearfully muttering, "Jack, I swear..."

== See also ==
- List of LGBT characters in modern written fiction
