= Blue Citrus Hearts =

2003 American romantic drama film

- Theatrical film poster
- Directed by: Morgan Jon Fox
- Written by: Morgan Jon Fox
- Produced by: Morgan Jon Fox
- Starring: Joshua Peter Laurenzi; Paul Foster
- Cinematography: Suzi Crashcourse; Morgan Jon Fox
- Edited by: Morgan Jon Fox
- Music by: Loggia; Morgan Jon Fox
- Release date: November 13, 2003 (Reeling)
- Running time: 115 minutes
- Country: United States
- Language: English

Blue Citrus Hearts is a 2003 American romantic drama film, written and directed by Morgan Jon Fox. The film stars Joshua Peter Laurenzi and Paul Foster. It premiered at Reeling: The Chicago LGBTQ+ International Film Festival in 2003.

== Synopsis ==
A coming-out, coming-of-age tale set in Memphis, Tennessee.

== Cast ==
- Joshua Peter Laurenzi as Sam
- Paul Foster as Julien
- Alex Booth as Arielle
- Caroline Fourmy as Ann
- William Taylor Woods as Carl
- Jason Booth as Trotter

== Reception ==
J.R. Jones of the Chicago Reader praised the music: "The indie-rock score is judiciously and powerfully employed throughout, and though Morgan Jon Fox's stylized use of color and text gets to be a bit much, his story never lets go." Ronnie Scheib of Variety lauded the film: "As the characters drift in and out of schoolrooms and relationships, color and focus are manipulated — sometimes sharp, clear, sometimes one color, hard to decipher — to mirror the hero's confusions and mood-swings. Thus, Fox and his shoestring Memphis film cooperative succeed in capturing the intensity of teen angst where many Hollywood films fail."
