= Indie Memphis =

Indie Memphis Logo

Indie Memphis, located in Memphis, TN, is an arts organization that runs year-round programs that "inspire, encourage and promote independent films and filmmaking in Memphis."

== Film festival ==
The organization is mainly known for its yearly film festival that takes place in Memphis. The festival, which typically occurs in November, was nationally ranked as one of the "25 Coolest Film Festivals" by MovieMaker magazine. The festival attracts filmmakers and musicians from across the nation during its weekend long run. The 2012 festival took place November 1–4, 2012.

== Notable other programs ==
- The Indie Memphis Concert Film Series, free summertime screenings of various concert films at the Levitt Shell, a local open air auditorium located in Overton Park
- Global Lens Film Series, a film program that showcases narrative films from across the world

== Awards ==
2013 Awards

- Best Narrative Feature: It Felt Like Love
- Duncan-Williams Scriptwriting Award: See You Next Tuesday
- Special Jury Award for outstanding performance: Eleanor Pienta (See You Next Tuesday)
- Special Jury Award - The Emerging Artist Award for the creative promise shown by their debut feature "What I Love About Concrete," directed by Katherine Dohan & Alanna Stewart
- Best Documentary Feature: "Brothers Hypnotic"
- Special Jury Award: Great Chicken Wing Hunt
- Southern Soul of Independent Film Award: "Orange Mound, Tennessee: America's Community"
- Ron Tibbett Excellence in Filmmaking Award: Bob Birdnow's Remarkable Tale of Human Survival and the Transcendence of Self
- Craig Brewer Emerging Filmmaker Award: "Escape from Tomorrow"

2012 Awards Narrative Feature Awards:

- Best Narrative Feature: Red Flag
- Duncan-Williams Scriptwriting Award: Redlegs
- Nice Shoes Award: Sun Don't Shine
- Special Features Jury Award for Cinematography: Pavilion
- Audience Award for Best Narrative Feature: Quartet

Documentary Awards:

- Best Documentary Feature: Big Star: Nothing Can Hurt Me
- Special Jury Prize for Documentary Feature: Very Extremely Dangerous
- Best Documentary Short: Mr. Smith's Peach Seeds
- Special Jury Prize for Documentary Short: Abuelas
- Audience Award for Documentary Feature: Antenna
- Audience Award for Documentary Short: Cardboard Titanics

Short Films Awards:

- Best Short Film: Throat Song
- Best Animated/Experimental Film: The Hunter
- Special Jury Prize for Cinematography: Suspended
- Special Jury Prize for Outstanding Performance: Robert Longstreet (for Cork's Cattlebaron and What Happens When Robert Leaves the Room)
- Audience Award for Narrative Short: Morning Stroll

Hometowner Awards:

- Best Hometowner Feature: Open Five 2
- Best Hometowner Narrative Short: Pretty Monsters
- Honorable Mention for Best Hometowner Narrative Short: Twine Sleep
- Best Hometowner Documentary Short: As I Am
- Audience Award for Hometowner Film: As I Am
- Special Jury Prize for Local Significance: Antenna

Festival Committee Awards:

- First Annual Indie Memphis Lifetime Achievement Award: Rod Pitts
- Soul of Southern Film Award: Pilgrim Song
- Ron Tibbett Excellence in Filmmaking Award: Reconvergence

2011 Awards Narrative Feature Awards:

- Best Narrative Feature: A Little Closer
- Duncan-Williams Scriptwriting Award: The Dish and the Spoon
- Nice Shoes Award: Without

Documentary Awards:

- Best Documentary Feature: Heaven+Earth+Joe Davis
- Special Jury Prize for Documentary Feature: This Is What Love In Action Looks Like

Hometowner Awards:

- Best Hometowner Feature: This Is What Love In Action Looks Like
- Best Hometowner Narrative Short: Fresh Sqweezed
- Audience Award for Hometowner Film: Fresh Sqweezed

Festival Committee Awards:

- Soul of Southern Film Award: Lord Byron
- Ron Tibbett Excellence in Filmmaking Award: Bad Fever
