= Boy Erased =

2018 biographical drama film

- Theatrical release poster
- Directed by: Joel Edgerton
- Screenplay by: Joel Edgerton
- Based on: Boy Erased: A Memoir by Garrard Conley
- Produced by: Joel Edgerton; Steve Golin; Kerry Kohansky Roberts
- Starring: Lucas Hedges; Nicole Kidman; Joel Edgerton; Joe Alwyn; Xavier Dolan; Troye Sivan; Cherry Jones; Flea; Russell Crowe
- Cinematography: Eduard Grau
- Edited by: Jay Rabinowitz
- Music by: Danny Bensi; Saunder Jurriaans
- Production companies: Perfect World Pictures; Anonymous Content; Blue-Tongue Films
- Distributed by: Focus Features (United States); Universal Pictures (Australia)
- Release dates: September 1, 2018 (Telluride); November 2, 2018 (United States); November 8, 2018 (Australia)
- Running time: 115 minutes
- Countries: Australia; United States
- Language: English
- Budget: $11 million
- Box office: $12 million

Boy Erased is a 2018 biographical drama film based on Garrard Conley's 2016 memoir. It was written and directed by Joel Edgerton, who also produced with Kerry Kohansky Roberts and Steve Golin. The film stars Lucas Hedges as Jared Eamons, a fictionalized version of Conley, the closeted gay son of Baptist parents (portrayed by Nicole Kidman and Russell Crowe), who is forced to take part in a conversion therapy program. Edgerton, Joe Alwyn, Xavier Dolan, Troye Sivan, Cherry Jones, and Flea also appear in supporting roles.

Boy Erased premiered at the Telluride Film Festival on September 1, 2018, and also screened at the Toronto International Film Festival. The film was theatrically released in the United States on November 2, 2018, by Focus Features and grossed over $12 million worldwide. It received generally positive reviews from critics, who mostly praised the performances of the cast, and received various award nominations, including two Golden Globe Award nominations: Best Actor for Hedges and Best Original Song for "Revelation". The film won the GLAAD Media Award for Outstanding Film – Limited Release at the 30th GLAAD Media Awards.

== Plot ==
Jared Eamons (Note: In the film, Conley's character is named Jared Eamons. The names of other characters based on real-life people have similarly been changed throughout the film.) is the son of Marshall Eamons, a car dealer and Baptist preacher in Arkansas, and Nancy Eamons, a hairdresser. He begins his first day at the Love in Action gay conversion therapy assessment program in Memphis, Tennessee.

Chief therapist Victor Sykes tells the group that their sexuality is a choice influenced by poor parenting. He instructs them to perform harsh "moral inventories" of themselves and their families and requires them not to tell anyone else about what occurs during the sessions. While performing his moral inventory, Jared thinks of his life prior to entering the program.

In high school, he was happy, though he broke up with his girlfriend upon starting college. There he became friends with another student, Henry. While staying the night in Jared's dorm room, Henry rapes Jared, apologizes, and confesses to doing the same to another young man. Traumatized, Jared returns home.

Henry calls the Eamon home and poses as a school counselor in order to out Jared and ensure his silence. Jared tells his parents this was another student who had told him things about his past and was afraid of Jared revealing his secrets. Jared later agrees that he is attracted to men. Marshall prays over his son and signs him up for conversion therapy, to which Jared reluctantly agrees.

Nancy rents a nearby motel room for her and Jared to stay in until he completes the assessment; however, Jared discovers that the therapy has no set end point if he fails to convince Sykes that he has become heterosexual. It appears that Jared will be at the institution for some time. After failing an exercise, attendee Cameron is humiliated by Sykes and intimidated with a fake funeral service. He is beaten with Bibles by the therapists and his family and is dunked in a bathtub as a horrified Jared looks on.

Returning to his moral inventory, Jared thinks of a brief encounter he had with an art student in college. He uses it when it is his time to confess, but Sykes pushes him to talk about Henry. He refuses, so Sykes attempts to make Jared "use his anger" and say he hates his father. Jared refuses, as it is Sykes that he is angry with.

Jared calls Nancy, begging her to pick him up. Sykes, his assistants, and the other attendees corner him behind a locked door despite Nancy's presence. Cameron stands up for him and helps get Jared to Nancy, who takes him home.

Nancy is horrified that she has allowed her husband to enroll Jared in an unvetted program. Marshall remains adamant about Jared remaining in it, but she overrules him. Soon after, Jared learns that Cameron died by suicide while still in the program's care.

Four years later, Jared is living in New York City with his boyfriend. He writes an article that exposes the realities of the Love in Action program. He returns home to convince his father to read the article and tells him that he is the one who must change, not Jared. He invites his father to join his mother in visiting him at Christmas.

== Cast ==
- Lucas Hedges as Jared Eamons (based on Garrard Conley)
- Nicole Kidman as Nancy Eamons (based on Martha Conley)
- Joel Edgerton as Victor Sykes (based on John Smid)
- Joe Alwyn as Henry Wallace
- Xavier Dolan as Jon
- Troye Sivan as Gary
- Cherry Jones as Dr. Muldoon
- Flea as Brandon
- Russell Crowe as Marshall Eamons (based on Hershel Conley)
- Théodore Pellerin as Xavier
- Britton Sear as Cameron Van Heusen
- Madelyn Cline as Chloe
- Emily Hinkler as Lee
- Jesse LaTourette as Sarah
- David Joseph Craig as Michael
- Matt Burke as Simon
- David Ditmore as Phillip
- Isaiah Gripper as Jared's Friend

== Production ==
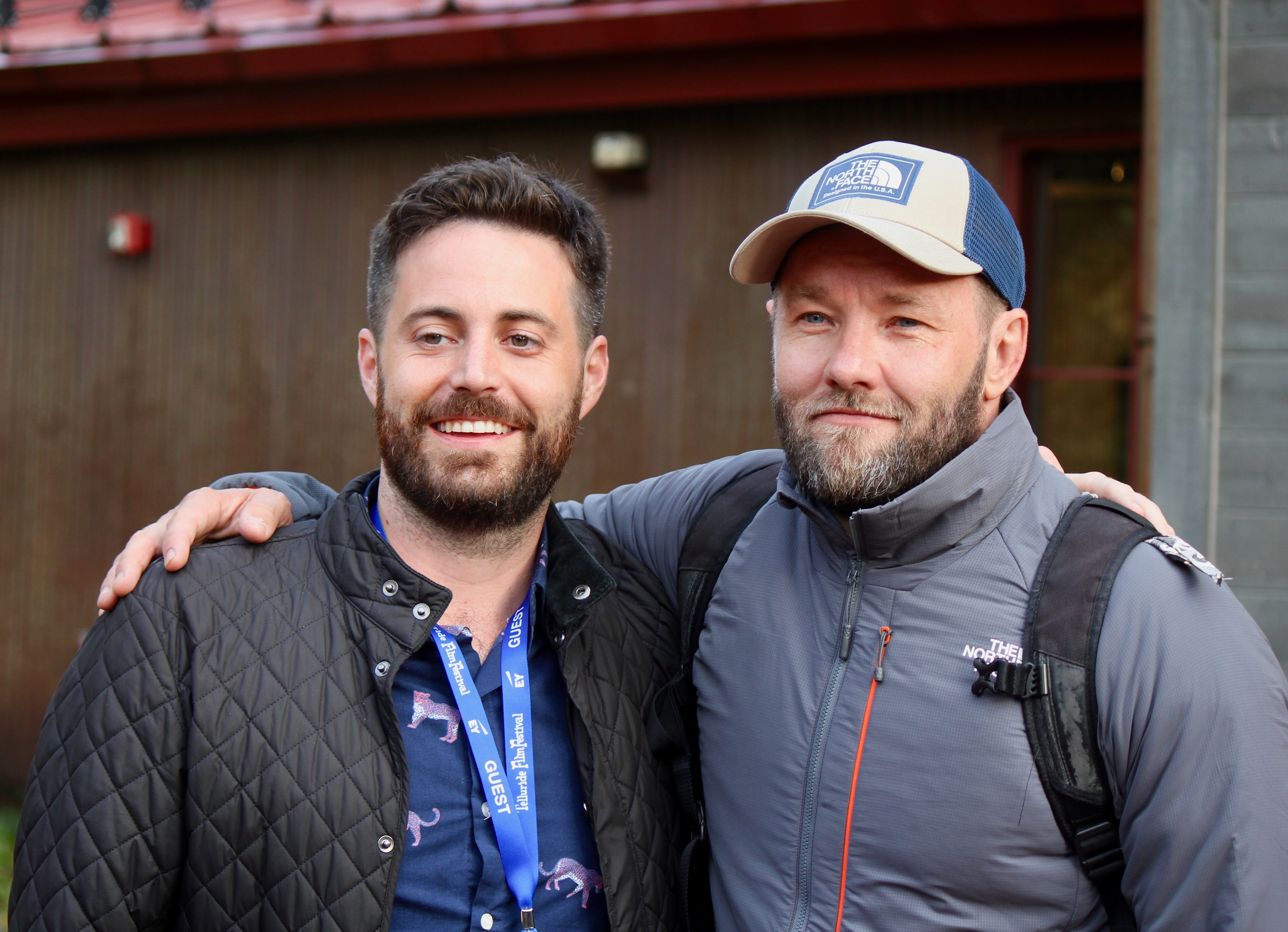
Garrard Conley and Joel Edgerton at the Telluride Film Festival

On June 8, 2017, it was revealed that a bidding war had begun between Netflix, Annapurna Pictures, Focus Features, and Amazon Studios for distribution rights to a film package set to star Lucas Hedges, Joel Edgerton, Nicole Kidman and Russell Crowe, and be directed and written by Edgerton, based on Garrard Conley's memoir Boy Erased. On June 21, 2017, it was announced that the bidding war for distribution rights for Boy Erased had boiled down to Netflix and Focus Features, and the latter ultimately won the rights.

In the press release, Edgerton spoke proudly of the project, stating:

I'm excited to work with an ensemble of actors, seasoned and new, to bring Garrard's story to the screen. I think Focus is the perfect partner on this, and I will always thank Garrard for trusting my passion for his life story. I can't think of a better reason to get behind the camera again.

In August 2017, the majority of the supporting cast was announced. In September 2017, Joe Alwyn and Madelyn Cline joined the cast as well, and principal photography on the film began September 8, 2017, in Atlanta, Georgia. In April 2018, re-shoots took place.

== Departures from source ==
The film makes several key changes to Garrard Conley's 2016 memoir. One pivotal scene in the film depicts the director of Love in Action pushing a lapsed participant onto his knees in front of a coffin and then having the young man beaten with a Bible. This scene does not take place in Conley's memoir. Scenes where a young man is dunked underwater and guards physically attempt to prevent Conley from leaving the treatment facility were also not present in the memoir.

== Analysis ==
Commentators on this film have focused on the film's portrayal of conversion therapy and the context surrounding its implementation. According to Ross Ufberg in his article "Survival Tales from the Ex-Gay Movement", conversion therapy is best understood as "a form of counseling (vigorously opposed by the American Psychiatric Association) that aims to change the sexual orientation of patients by treating homosexuality as a mental disorder". The specific program referenced in the movie, Love in Action (LIA), was a facility in which individuals spent anywhere from a few weeks to multiple years. LIA represented a faction of a broader Christian, ex-gay movement that was sparked following the removal of homosexuality from the Diagnostic and Statistical Manual of Mental Disorders by the American Psychological Association in 1973, according to Austin Williams Miller. In the years following this removal, various associations funded research to showcase the efficacy of conversion therapy, including the National Association for Research and Therapy of Homosexuality.

Williams Miller notes that activism fueled Boy Erased. Such activism protests the fact that as of May 2019, conversion therapy is still legal for minors in most jurisdictions in the United States.

Multiple sources point out the hypocrisy in some of the members of LIA who are noted in the film. In further analysis of the true story behind the film, Ross Ufberg discussed John Smid, an individual who spent years preaching the LIA ideology but eventually abandoned the program to live an openly gay life. According to Ufberg's analysis, Smid married two women prior to marrying a man. Subsequently, Smid publicly apologized and acknowledged that his "public presence is a trigger" to some people. Williams Miller noted that many of the lead members of LIA now live openly gay lives.

== Release ==
The film had its world premiere at the Telluride Film Festival on September 1, 2018. It also screened at the Toronto International Film Festival, first for the press and industry on September 8, 2018, and then for the public on September 11, 12 and 15. The film was initially scheduled for release on September 28, 2018, but was pushed back to November 2, 2018.

== Reception ==
=== Box office ===
Boy Erased opened in five theaters and grossed $207,057, an average of $41,411 per venue, the thirteenth-highest opening weekend per-theater average of 2018. In its second weekend, it grossed $758,173 from 77 theaters. Overall, Boy Erased grossed $7 million in the United States and Canada and $5 million in other territories for a total worldwide gross of $12 million.

=== Critical response ===
On review aggregator Rotten Tomatoes, the film holds an approval rating of 80% based on 266 reviews, with an average rating of 6.9/10. The website's critical consensus reads, "Anchored in empathy by writer-director-star Joel Edgerton, Boy Erased proves the road to complex, powerfully performed drama can also be paved with good intentions." On Metacritic, the film has a weighted average score of 69 out of 100, based on 48 critics, indicating "generally favorable" reviews. Audiences polled by PostTrak gave the film a 95 percent overall positive score and an 85 percent "definite recommend".

A.O. Scott of the New York Times noted a lack of nuance in the characterization of the Eamons family. Consequently, Scott felt the movie became no more than a "summary of its noble intentions". Ben Travis's review of the film on the news site Empire held a similar sentiment to Scott's, acknowledging that it "navigates the intersection between traditional religious beliefs and internalized homophobia". Despite positive remarks, Travis believed that the film failed to "connect as a human drama". Chris Nashawaty of Entertainment Weekly held a similar attitude, noting the film's strong message but stating it could have been better executed. Another critique, from Peter Bradshaw of The Guardian, declared that the movie was lacking "comedy and lightness". Benjamin Lee, writing for The Guardian, remarked, "It's a curiously underwhelming, muted, often plodding two hours that fails to reach the emotional highs and devastating lows" that would be anticipated.

=== Accolades ===
Award	Date of ceremony	Category	Nominee(s)	Result	Ref.
Artios Awards	January 31, 2019	Feature Big Budget Drama	Carmen Cuba, Tara Feldstein Bennett (Location Casting); Chase Paris (Location Casting) and Shelby Cherniet (Associate)	Nominated	
AACTA Awards	December 2, 2018	Best Adapted Screenplay	Joel Edgerton	Won	
AACTA Awards	December 2, 2018	Best Direction	Joel Edgerton	Nominated	
AACTA Awards	December 2, 2018	Best Film	Kerry Kohansky Roberts, Steve Golin, Joel Edgerton	Nominated	
AACTA Awards	December 2, 2018	Best Lead Actor	Lucas Hedges	Nominated	
AACTA Awards	December 2, 2018	Best Supporting Actor	Russell Crowe	Nominated	
AACTA Awards	December 2, 2018	Best Supporting Actor	Joel Edgerton	Nominated	
AACTA Awards	December 2, 2018	Best Supporting Actress	Nicole Kidman	Won	
AACTA Awards	January 4, 2019	Best International Supporting Actor	Joel Edgerton	Nominated	
AACTA Awards	January 4, 2019	Best International Supporting Actress	Nicole Kidman	Won	
Camerimage International Film Festival	November 10–17, 2018	Best Directorial Debut	Joel Edgerton	Nominated	
Chicago International Film Festival	October 10–21, 2018	Gold Q-Hugo Award	Boy Erased	Nominated	
Critics' Choice Movie Awards	January 13, 2019	Best Supporting Actress	Nicole Kidman	Nominated	
Golden Globe Awards	January 6, 2019	Best Actor in a Motion Picture – Drama	Lucas Hedges	Nominated	
Golden Globe Awards	January 6, 2019	Best Original Song	"Revelation" – Leland, Troye Sivan and Jónsi	Nominated	
Hollywood Music in Media Awards	November 14, 2018	Best Original Song – Feature Film	"Revelation" – Leland, Troye Sivan and Jónsi	Nominated	
Humanitas Prize	February 8, 2019	Drama Feature Film	Boy Erased	Nominated	
Mill Valley Film Festival	October 3–13, 2018	Audience Award – US Cinema	Boy Erased	Runner-up	
San Diego International Film Festival	October 10–14, 2018	Audience Award	Boy Erased	Won	
Satellite Awards	February 17, 2019	Best Actor in a Motion Picture, Drama	Lucas Hedges	Nominated	
Satellite Awards	February 17, 2019	Best Original Song	"Revelation" – Leland, Troye Sivan and Jónsi	Nominated	
Satellite Awards	February 17, 2019	Best Supporting Actor	Russell Crowe	Nominated	
Satellite Awards	February 17, 2019	Best Supporting Actress	Nicole Kidman	Nominated	
GLAAD Media Awards	May 4, 2019	Outstanding Film – Limited Release	Boy Erased	Won	
