= Lucas Hedges =

American actor (born 1996)

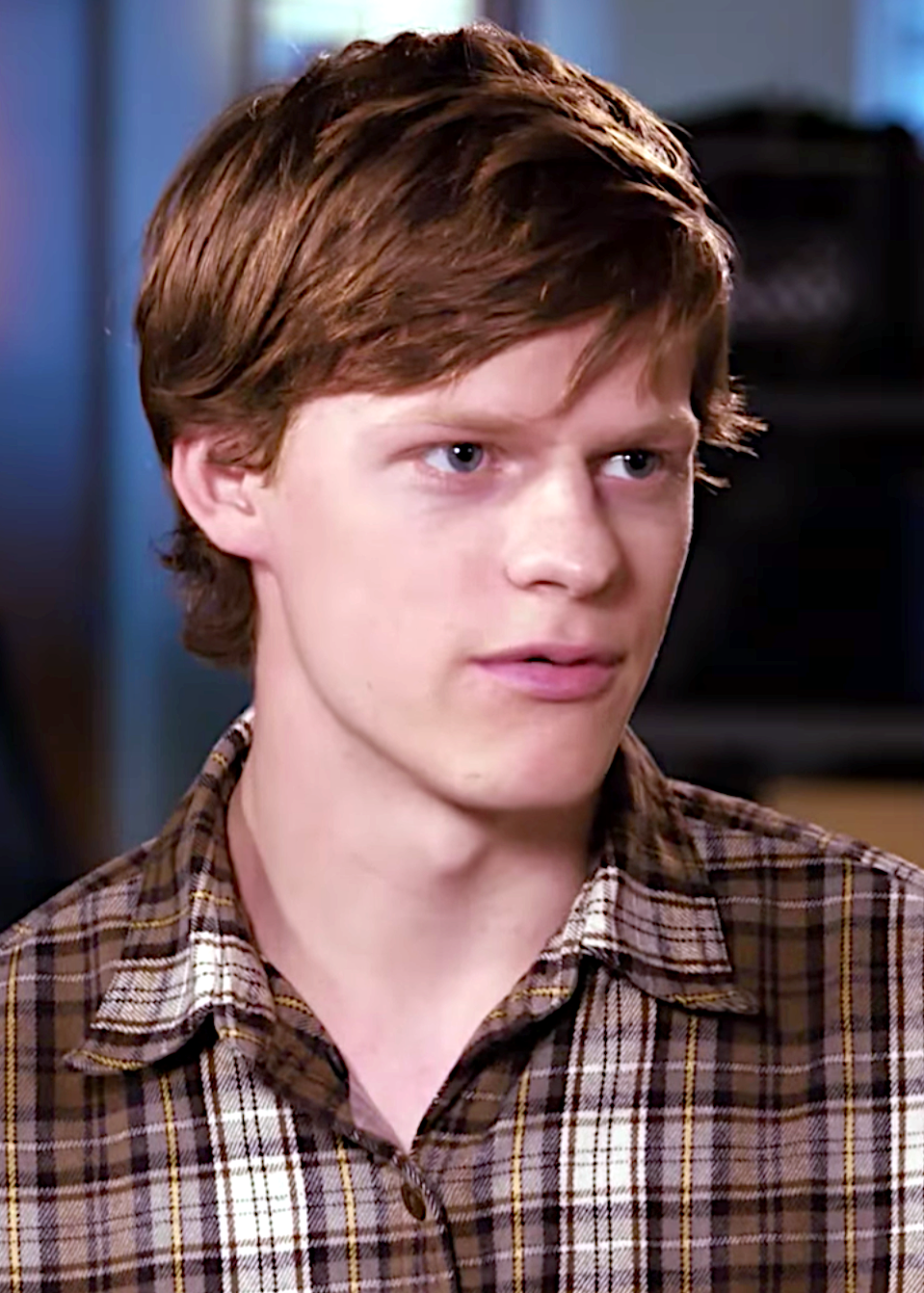
- Hedges in 2017
- Born: December 12, 1996 (age 29); New York City, U.S.
- Education: University of North Carolina School of the Arts
- Occupation: Actor
- Years active: 2007–present
- Parent: Peter Hedges (father)
- Awards: Full list

Lucas Hedges (born December 12, 1996) is an American actor. A son of filmmaker Peter Hedges, he studied theater at the University of North Carolina School of the Arts. Hedges began his acting career with a supporting role in Wes Anderson's comedy-drama Moonrise Kingdom (2012). He had his breakthrough in 2016 playing a sardonic teenager in Kenneth Lonergan's drama Manchester by the Sea, which earned him a nomination for the Academy Award for Best Supporting Actor, among other accolades. Hedges then starred as an aggressive youth in an off-Broadway production of Yen and had supporting roles in the coming-of-age film Lady Bird and the drama Three Billboards Outside Ebbing, Missouri in 2017.

In 2018, Hedges played the lead role of a teenager forced into a gay conversion therapy program in Boy Erased, which earned him nominations for both the Golden Globe Award for Best Actor in a Drama and the AACTA Award for Best Actor in a Leading Role. He also made his Broadway debut in a revival of Lonergan's drama The Waverly Gallery in the same year. In 2023, he starred as Ennis Del Mar in a West End theatre production of Brokeback Mountain.

== Early life ==
Hedges was born in Brooklyn, New York City, the second of two boys born to poet and actress Susan Bruce (née Titman) and screenwriter and director Peter Hedges. His paternal grandfather, the Rev. Robert Boyden Hedges, was an Episcopal minister. His maternal grandfather was a former vice president in New York at HBO, and his maternal grandmother, Narcissa Titman, is a former theatre director and lecturer. He has an older brother, Simon, who works in private equity in New York. He grew up in Brooklyn Heights and Cobble Hill, frequently visiting his father's film sets. As a child, Hedges made his feature film debut as an extra in his father's film Dan in Real Life (2007), but his line in the film was cut in post-production.

A graduate of Saint Ann's School, he studied theatre at the University of North Carolina School of the Arts from 2015 to 2016. Hedges is a graduate of the Cherubs Theatre Program at Northwestern University's National High School Institute.

== Career ==
=== Early roles and breakthrough (2012–2017) ===
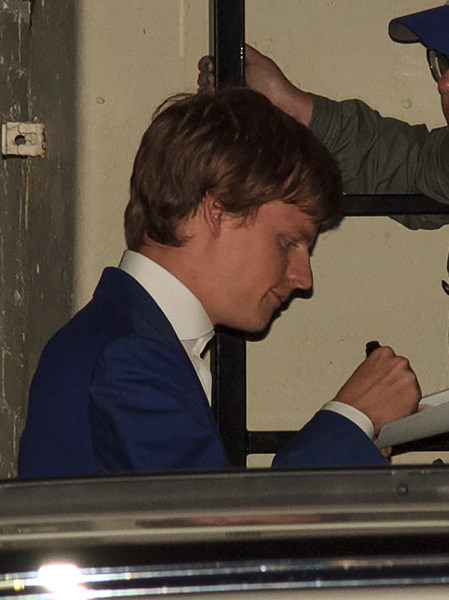
Hedges at the 2016 Toronto International Film Festival

During a middle-school play production, Hedges was spotted by the casting director for Wes Anderson's Moonrise Kingdom (2012), who eventually cast him in the film as Redford. He went on to play small roles in the comedy-drama Arthur Newman (2012), Jason Reitman's romance Labor Day (2013), and Terry Gilliam's science fiction film The Zero Theorem (2013). In 2014, Hedges had a minor role in Anderson's The Grand Budapest Hotel and played the son of Jeremy Renner's character in Michael Cuesta's drama Kill the Messenger, which was based on CIA involvement in Contra cocaine trafficking. The latter led the critic Todd McCarthy to rank him as "very good," and Rodrigo Perez of IndieWire considered him to be the "surprise stand-out of the cast." In 2015, he was cast in the NBC miniseries The Slap, which was adapted from the Australian series of the same name.

Hedges next joined the cast of Kenneth Lonergan's independent drama Manchester by the Sea (2016). In it, he played Patrick Chandler, a 16-year-old boy dealing with the recent death of his father, who is left in the care of his unwilling and troubled uncle (played by Casey Affleck). The film premiered at the Sundance Film Festival. Tim Robey of The Daily Telegraph wrote, "Hedges, phenomenal, fights off every cliché of 'troubled' teenagerhood and gives us a gruff, sympathetic boy with a tearaway sex drive." Peter Bradshaw of The Guardian said his performance was "glorious" and added that he "makes a tremendous troubled 16-year-old." It earned over $78 million against its $9 million budget. For his work, Hedges won a Critics' Choice Movie Award for Best Young Performer, and received a nomination for the Academy Award for Best Supporting Actor, among others.

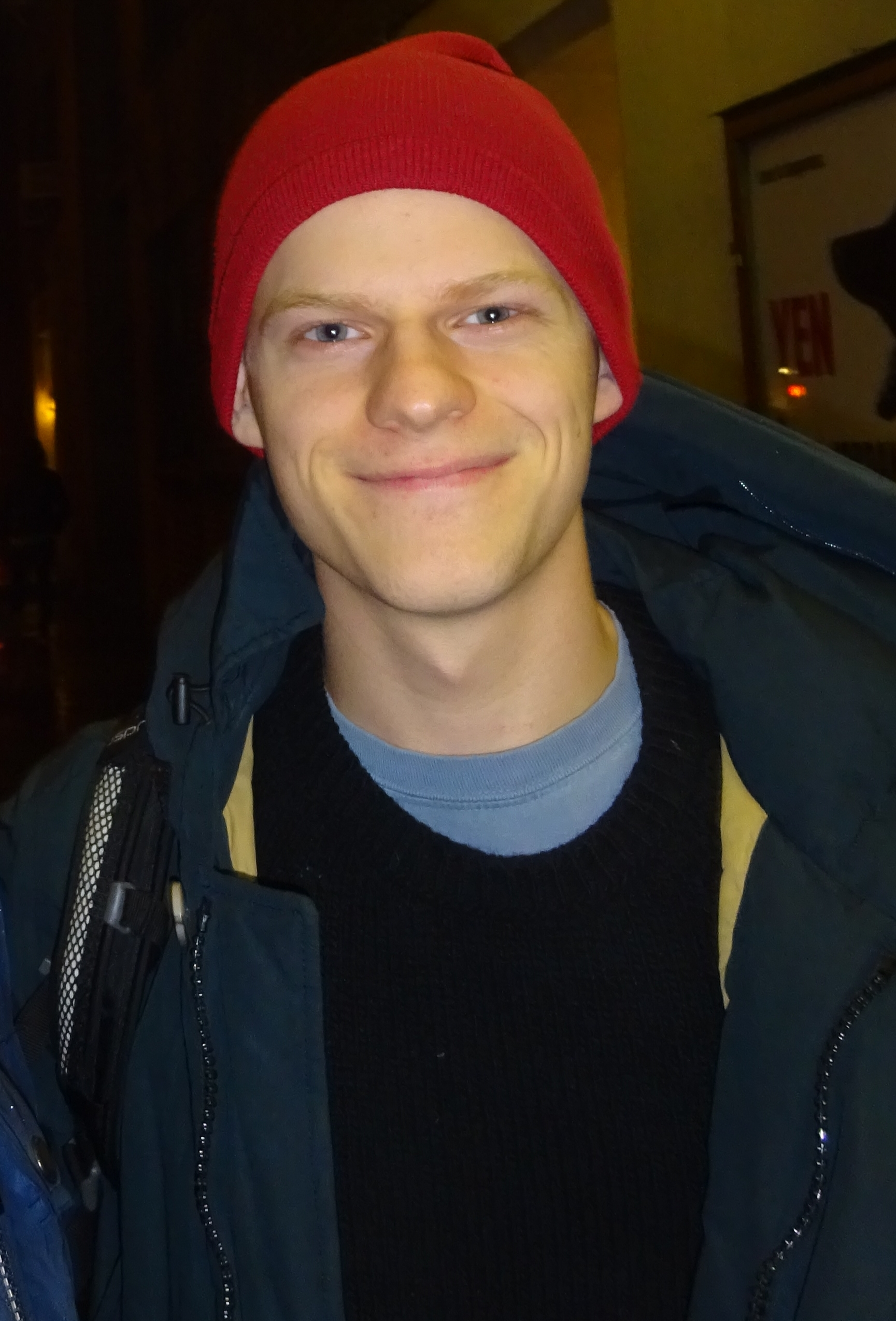
Hedges in 2017

The following year, Hedges made his stage debut as the lead in the Trip Cullman-directed off-Broadway play Yen, penned by the playwright Anna Jordan. The production ran from February 19 to March 4 at the Lucille Lortel Theatre. Taking note of his performance as an aggressive and violent teenager who shares a troubled relationship with his half-brother, Ben Brantley of The New York Times wrote that he "delivers an expert anatomy of an adolescent on the edge of explosion". Hedges was nominated for the Lucille Lortel Award for Outstanding Lead Actor in a Play and won the Theatre World Award for Outstanding Off-Broadway Debut Performance. Also in 2017, Hedges had supporting roles in two films—Greta Gerwig's directorial debut Lady Bird and Martin McDonagh's crime drama Three Billboards Outside Ebbing, Missouri, both of which were nominated for the Academy Award for Best Picture. The cast of the latter film were awarded with the SAG Award for Outstanding Performance by a Cast.

=== Lead roles and theatre (2018–present) ===
Hedges had three film releases in 2018. He played the supporting role of a teenager who violently bullies his younger brother (played by Sunny Suljic) in Mid90s, which marked the directorial debut of Jonah Hill. Eric Kohn of IndieWire wrote, "Hedges, quickly becoming the most impressive actor of his generation, buries himself in the gruff, unhappy role of an angst-riddled teen." Hedges played the lead role in his two other 2018 films—Boy Erased and Ben Is Back. In the former, based on the eponymous memoir, he played the son of a Baptist pastor who is forced to take part in a gay conversion therapy program. Russell Crowe and Nicole Kidman played his parents. Writing for The Hollywood Reporter, Stephen Farber noted that Hedges "carries the entire show and is alternately frightened, bewildered and defiant. There isn't a false note in his performance." For Boy Erased, Hedges received a nomination for the Golden Globe Award for Best Actor in a Drama. In Ben Is Back, a drama directed by his father and co-starring Julia Roberts, he played the titular character, a drug addict who returns home after spending time in rehab. Pete Hammond of Deadline Hollywood praised both Roberts's and Hedges's performances, adding that they "are pitch perfect together, never striking a false note in demonstrating the everlasting bond between a mother and son."

Also in 2018, Hedges made his first appearance on Broadway in a revival of Kenneth Lonergan's play The Waverly Gallery, alongside Elaine May, at the John Golden Theatre. He played the role of a teenager coping with his grandmother's Alzheimer's disease. Chris Jones of the Chicago Tribune credited him for effectively conveying the "frustration family members feel when one of their own starts to decline." Honey Boy, a drama penned by and co-starring Shia LaBeouf about his childhood and relationship with his father, marked Hedges's first film release of 2019. Hedges and Noah Jupe played Otis Lort, a character based on LaBeouf, at different ages. Reviewing the film for Entertainment Weekly, Leah Greenblatt wrote that Hedges "doesn't seem to have found a role yet he can't fully inhabit; his Otis is raw and furious, and genuinely funny." He next took on a supporting part in Trey Edward Shults' Waves, a drama about the emotional journey of a suburban family, which led Peter Debruge of Variety to consider it "an impactful reminder of how much the actor can bring to a smaller role".

In 2020, Hedges appeared in the miniseries Home Movie: The Princess Bride for Quibi to raise money for World Central Kitchen. Also that year, he starred alongside Michelle Pfeiffer in the black comedy French Exit, and was part of the ensemble cast of Steven Soderbergh's comedy film Let Them All Talk. In his review of the former film, IndieWire's David Ehrlich was appreciative of Hedges' "subdued but strikingly thoughtful performance". The following year, he appeared in an episode of the FX anthology series The Premise.

Hedges took a small break from acting to focus on writing, and returned to the stage in a 2023 West End theatre production of Brokeback Mountain at @sohoplace, in which he starred as Ennis Del Mar opposite Mike Faist's Jack Twist. Comparing his performance to Heath Ledger's portrayal of Del Mar in the 2005 film of the same name, theatre critic Matt Wolf of The New York Times wrote that Hedges "may not have the immediate physical command that Ledger had onscreen, but he shares his late predecessor's furrowed brow and a sense of roiling anguish". The following year, he had a supporting role in the biographical film Shirley, about the 1972 presidential run of Shirley Chisholm.

Hedges's next release, Sorry, Baby, starring, written and directed by Eva Victor, premiered at the 2025 Sundance Film Festival. Commenting on his role as a kind neighbor of the film's troubled protagonist (played by Victor), Peter Debruge considered it "perfectly suited to Lucas Hedges' uniquely sensitive energy".

== Personal life ==
When asked about his sexuality in 2018, Hedges said: "In the early stages of my life, some of the people I was most infatuated with were my closest male friends. That was the case through high school, and I think I was always aware of that, while for the most part I was attracted to women," also adding that he exists "on that spectrum: Not totally straight, but also not gay and not necessarily bisexual." He later spoke about being an ally to the LGBTQ community and said that he considered his sexuality to be a "fluid experience."

== Filmography ==
=== Film ===
Year	Title	Role	Notes
2007	Dan in Real Life	Lilly's Dance Partner	(Note: Dialogue cut in post-production.)
2012	Moonrise Kingdom	Redford	
2012	Arthur Newman	Kevin Avery	
2013	Labor Day	Richard	
2013	The Zero Theorem	Bob	
2014	The Grand Budapest Hotel	Pump Attendant	
2014	Kill the Messenger	Ian Webb	
2015	Anesthesia	Greg	
2016	Manchester by the Sea	Patrick Chandler	
2017	Pigeonhearts	Eli	Short film
2017	Lady Bird	Danny O'Neill	
2017	Three Billboards Outside Ebbing, Missouri	Robbie Hayes	
2018	Boy Erased	Jared Eamons	
2018	Ben Is Back	Ben Burns	
2018	Mid90s	Ian	
2019	Honey Boy	Otis Lort	
2019	Waves	Luke	
2020	French Exit	Malcolm Price	
2020	Let Them All Talk	Tyler Hughes	
2024	Shirley	Robert Gottlieb	
2025	Sorry, Baby	Gavin	
TBA	Love Is Not the Answer	Director Jay	Filming
TBA	Old Friends New Friends		Pre-production

Key
†	Denotes films that have not yet been released

=== Television ===
Year	Title	Role	Notes
2012	The Corrections	Young Chip Lambert	Unaired pilot
2015	The Slap	Ritchie Joanou (né Collins)	5 episodes
2020	Home Movie: The Princess Bride	Westley	Episode: "Chapter Six: The Fire Swamp"
2021	The Premise	Jesse Wheeler	Episode: "The Ballad of Jesse Wheeler"

=== Theatre ===
Year	Title	Role	Theater	Notes
2017	Yen	Hench	Lucille Lortel Theatre	Off-Broadway
2018	The Waverly Gallery	Daniel Reed	John Golden Theatre	Broadway
2020	This Is Our Youth	Warren Straub	—	Virtual play
2023	Brokeback Mountain	Ennis Del Mar	@sohoplace	West End

=== Audiobooks ===
Year	Title	Role	Author
2020	Love, Kurt: The Vonnegut Love Letters, 1941-1945	Narrator	Edith Vonnegut

=== Music Videos ===
Year	Title	Role	Artist
2020	"Sue Me"	Supporting	Wale (feat. Kelly Price)
2022	"Kill Her Freak Out"	Supporting	Samia
2025	"Love Takes Miles"	Lead	Cameron Winter

== Awards and nominations ==
Hedges was nominated for Academy Award for Best Supporting Actor for his performance in Manchester by the Sea (2016), and for the Golden Globe Award for Best Actor – Motion Picture Drama for his performance in Boy Erased (2018).
