= Craig Brewer =

American filmmaker (born 1971)

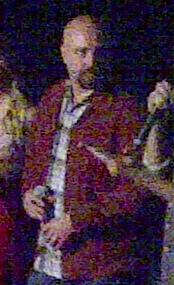
- Brewer in 2011
- Born: Craig Houston Brewer; December 6, 1971 (age 54); Newport News, Virginia, U.S.
- Occupations: Film director; producer; screenwriter
- Known for: Hustle & Flow

Craig Houston Brewer (born December 6, 1971) is an American filmmaker. His 2005 movie Hustle & Flow won the Audience Award at the 2005 Sundance Film Festival and achieved commercial success, along with an Academy Award for Best Original Song, "It's Hard out Here for a Pimp". He is also known for directing the 2011 remake of Footloose, the 2019 film Dolemite Is My Name and the 2021 film Coming 2 America, the latter two films starring Academy Award nominee Eddie Murphy.

== Early life ==
Brewer is the son of Gail, a teacher, and Walter D. Brewer, an executive who worked for Matson Navigation Co. He is of Irish, English, and Spanish descent. He was born in Newport News, Virginia, where his father was stationed in the Army, and grew up in Vallejo, California. One of his grandparents was Marv Throneberry, a professional baseball player and spokeswoman for Miller Lite beer.

== Career ==
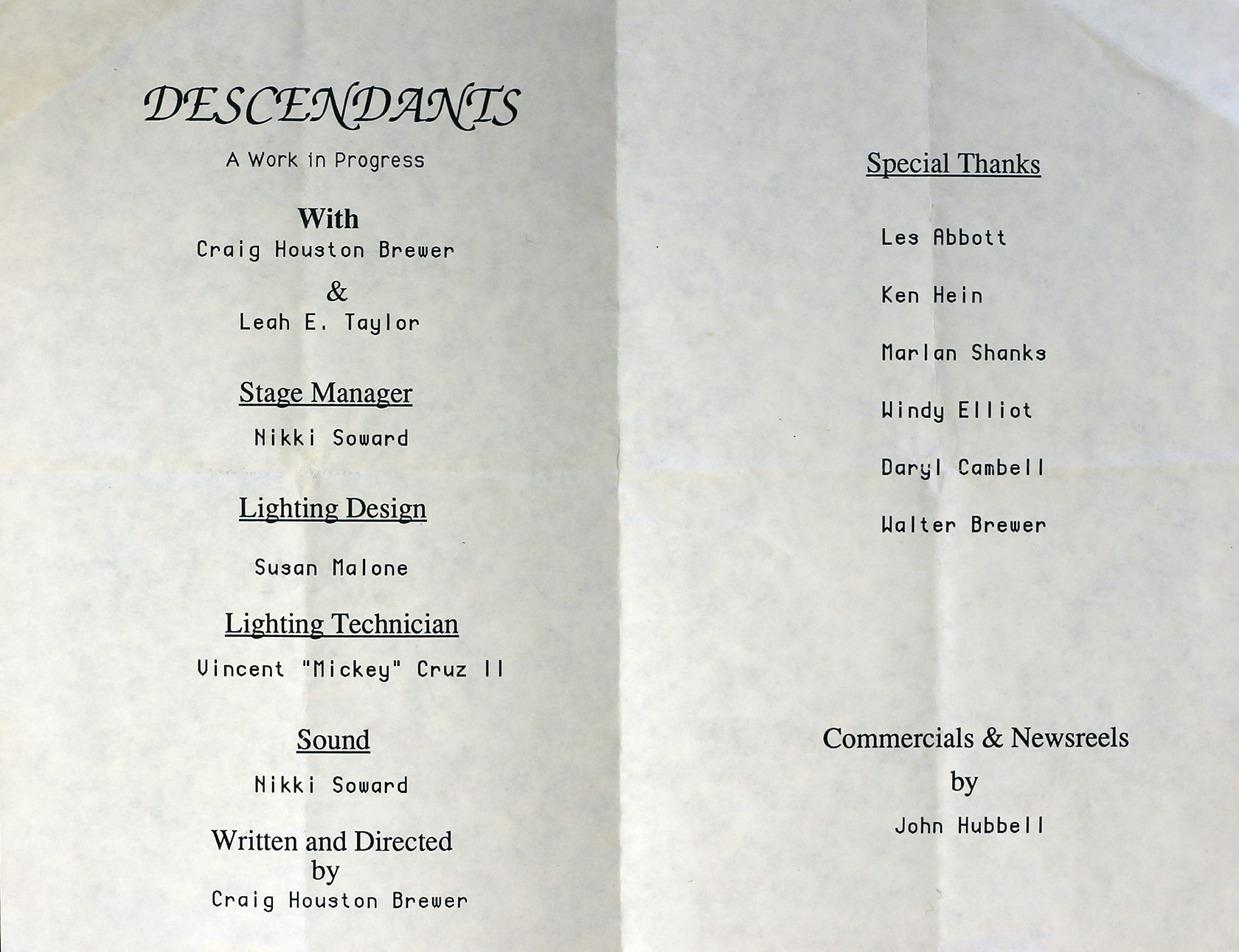
Program of a college play by Craig Brewer, ca. 1991

Hustle & Flow was financed by filmmaker John Singleton, also produced by Stephanie Allain, Preston Holmes and executive produced by Dwight Williams. Singleton was impressed by Brewer's first feature, The Poor & Hungry, shot in Memphis, Tennessee. Ten years after the release of Hustle & Flow, Brewer re-teamed with Terrence Howard and Taraji P. Henson on their acclaimed television series, Empire. The first episode he directed, "Fires of Heaven", aired October 7, 2015. Brewer would go on to direct ten more episodes in the series' run.

Brewer's subsequent project, Black Snake Moan, began filming in September 2005 and stars Samuel L. Jackson, Christina Ricci, and Justin Timberlake. Black Snake Moan was partially filmed in Stanton, Tennessee. Production completed on Black Snake Moan in October 2005 and it was released on March 2, 2007. His first big-budget film, a remake of the 1984 film, Footloose was released on October 14, 2011, after Brewer and the two stars of the film, Kenny Wormald and Julianne Hough, completed a national press tour promoting the film.

In 2012, Brewer was executive producer of Katy Perry: Part of Me. That same year, Brewer premiered a documentary he directed about Indie Memphis and filmmakers called Indie Origins. In 2014, Brewer was elected President of Indie Memphis for two years. A year later, Brewer released a video made in conjunction with the Memphis Grizzlies on the city's adoration of player Marc Gasol; Brewer himself makes a brief appearance at the beginning of the video.

Brewer is also the creator of $5 Cover, an MTV drama series about Memphis musicians. The 15-episode show was broadcast online and on MTV, and featured Memphis musicians playing themselves and their original songs. Other TV projects include an episode of The Shield and the pilot to Terriers. Brewer returned to directing TV pilots with Boomerang for FOX, starring Felicity Huffman. It was not picked up. In January 2014, Brewer signed a deal with Paramount Television to executive produce, write and direct two TV drama pilots. In late May 2015, one of these shows was revealed to be a television adaptation of the film Urban Cowboy; Brewer wrote the pilot and directed it, but the pilot was not picked up by FOX.

In late February 2013, Brewer's theatrical follow-up to Footloose was announced as Gangster Princess of Beverly Hills, based on the true-life crime escapades of Lisette Lee, a young woman who claimed to be the heiress of Samsung. Brewer will write and direct. A year later, Brewer was also attached to potentially direct a new version of The Idolmaker, with Justin Timberlake producing.

Brewer wrote a draft for Warner Bros.' 2016 film The Legend of Tarzan, directed by David Yates.

In June 2018, Brewer began directing a Netflix feature, Dolemite Is My Name. Based on the life of Rudy Ray Moore, the film stars Academy Award nominee Eddie Murphy as Moore, a '70s comedian who puts up the money to make an action film based on a character from his stand-up material. The film is written by Scott Alexander and Larry Karaszewski. Other cast members include Wesley Snipes, Craig Robinson and Mike Epps. The film was released in 2019.

In January 2019, it was announced that Brewer would direct Eddie Murphy in Coming 2 America. Production began in August 2019. Due to the COVID-19 pandemic closing theaters worldwide the film was released through Amazon Prime Video, on March 5, 2021. The film became a huge success for Amazon, topping the Nielsen ratings ahead of every other TV show or movie on major streaming subscription services.

In December 2021, Deadline broke the news that Brewer would be reteaming with Footloose actor Dennis Quaid in a biopic on the life of African-American country singer Charley Pride titled American Pride. Quaid will co-produce the film with Brewer and co-star as singer/songwriter "Cowboy" Jack Clement. The film will be written by Empire writer Dianne Houston.

In December 2023, Deadline reported that Brewer would direct select episodes of the Peacock miniseries Fight Night: The Million Dollar Heist, starring and produced by Kevin Hart. The series reunites Brewer with past cast members Samuel L. Jackson from Black Snake Moan and Terrence Howard and Taraji P. Henson from Hustle & Flow and Empire.

In October 2024, Variety reported that Brewer would write and direct a narrative feature adaptation of the documentary Song Sung Blue, starring Academy Award nominees Hugh Jackman and Kate Hudson. The film follows the true story of Milwaukee couple Mike and Claire Sardina, down-on-their-luck musicians who became local icons by performing as "Lightning & Thunder".

In June 2025, Deadline Hollywood reported that Brewer would direct and co-write a biopic on the life of rapper Snoop Dogg (who previously appeared in Brewer's Dolemite is My Name). The film will be co-written by Joe Robert Cole and produced by Dogg and Brian Grazer.

== Filmography ==
Year	Film	Director	Writer	Producer
2000	The Poor & Hungry	Yes	Yes	Yes
2004	Resolutions of the Complacent Man	Yes	Yes	
2005	Hustle & Flow	Yes	Yes	
2006	Black Snake Moan	Yes	Yes	
2011	Footloose	Yes	Yes	
2012	Indie Origins	Yes		
2012	Katy Perry: Part of Me			Yes
2016	The Legend of Tarzan		Yes	
2019	Dolemite Is My Name	Yes		
2021	Coming 2 America	Yes		
2025	Song Sung Blue	Yes	Yes	Yes
2027	Snoop	Yes	Yes	

Television

- The Shield ("Petty Cash") (TV series) (2008) (director)
- Terriers ("Pilot") (TV series) (2010) (director)
- Empire ("Fires of Heaven") (TV series) (2015) (director)
- Empire ("Sins that Amend") (TV series) (2016) (director)
- Empire ("Sound and Fury", "Toil & Trouble, Part I", "Full Circle") (TV series) (2017) (director)
- Empire ("Full Circle", "Birds in the Cage", "Of Hardiness is Mother", "The Empire Unpossess'd") (TV series) (2018) (director)
- Empire ("Without All Remedy", "The Roughest Day") (TV series) (2019) (director)
- Urban Cowboy ("Pilot") (TV series) (did not go to series) (writer/director)
- Boomerang ("Pilot") (TV series) (did not go to series) (director)
- $5 Cover (web series for MTV) (2009) (creator/director)
- Fight Night: The Million Dollar Heist ("Round One: The Ballad of Chicken Man", "Round Two: Fight Night", "Round Seven: Jekyll Island", "Round Eight: Testify") (miniseries for Peacock) (2024)
