= Boy Erased: A Memoir =

2016 memoir by Garrard Conley

- Author: Garrard Conley
- Language: English
- Subject: Conversion therapy
- Genre: Memoir
- Publisher: Riverhead Books
- Publication date: May 10, 2016
- Publication place: United States
- Media type: Print (hardcover)
- Pages: 352 pp (hardback)
- ISBN: 978-1-59463-301-0

Boy Erased: A Memoir is a 2016 memoir by Garrard Conley recounting his childhood in a fundamentalist Arkansas family that enrolled him in conversion therapy. According to The Week, it aims to bridge the cultural divide—"one that makes gay conversion therapy seem a natural choice in some places and unfathomable in others". It was adapted into the 2018 film Boy Erased.

== Synopsis ==
The only child of a car salesman and soon-to-be Baptist pastor, Conley was "terrified and conflicted about his sexuality". At 19, while in college, he was outed as gay to his parents by another student who had raped him. His parents gave him the choice of being disowned or going to gay conversion therapy that promised to "cure" his homosexuality. The timing came as his father was about to be ordained as a Baptist minister. Conley was enrolled in a Love in Action ex-gay program, and recounts the harm he was subjected to there in the name of curing his sexuality. He recounts the months of counseling he underwent followed by a two-week intensive intervention. He also includes other participants' accounts and a "Timeline of the Ex-Gay Movement".

== Background ==
Conley's hope is that his story will expose ex-gay groups and gay conversion therapy programs as lacking in compassion and more likely to cause harm than cure anything, especially when participants are told, as he was, that they are "unfixable and disgusting over and over again".

== Reception ==
- The Bay Area Reporter wrote, "Conley's memoir oscillates between his revelations, good and bad, during time spent in the fold of the ex-gay ministry during his two-week stint in the 'Source' trial program, and his personal and familial history [that led up to] induction in the program." Its reviewer called the book "well-written, compelling, disturbing, and ultimately quite bracing ... an important, refreshingly unsentimental perspective on the dangers and abuses of ex-gay therapy ministries, an atrocious, damaging, hypocritical network that still operates today".
- Edge Media Network wrote, "Testimonies like Boy Erased are a necessary part of getting rid of ex-gay ministries or, really, any kind of program in which the explicit aim is to change the identity (in this case, the sexuality) of the subjects."
- The Washington Post's reviewer Jamie Brickhouse wrote: "It's a powerful convergence of events that Conley portrays eloquently, if a bit earnestly. Conley was full of confusing contradictions—as deeply embedded in the teachings of the Bible as he was in the prose of great literature."
- Michigan Quarterly Review wrote, "It's in part Conley's deft hand with prose, in part his ability to transcend trauma to render an honest, visceral picture of himself."
- GLBT Reviews wrote, "Conley had much to confront as he inwardly acknowledged his homosexuality, including layers upon layers of family complexity, but as he unspools his eventful journey, he brings readers deep into his mind and soul for a satisfying ride."
- Kirkus Reviews wrote, "Readers follow Conley through a very difficult process of self-identification that sheds light on the degrees of intolerance that are still present in today's world. At times, the text feels a bit passive; some readers may expect more blatant outrage. Nevertheless, Conley has chosen to expose ex-gay therapy as abusive, and that is important."
- GLBT Publishers Weekly stated, "This timely addition to the debate on conversion therapy will build sympathy for both children and parents who avail themselves of it while still showing how damaging it can be."
- Out Smart Magazine stated, "Boy Erased digs deep into a life lived in shadow, the story of a survivor and not of the establishment (which have largely been the voices heard speaking out about ex-gay therapy)."

== Film adaptation ==
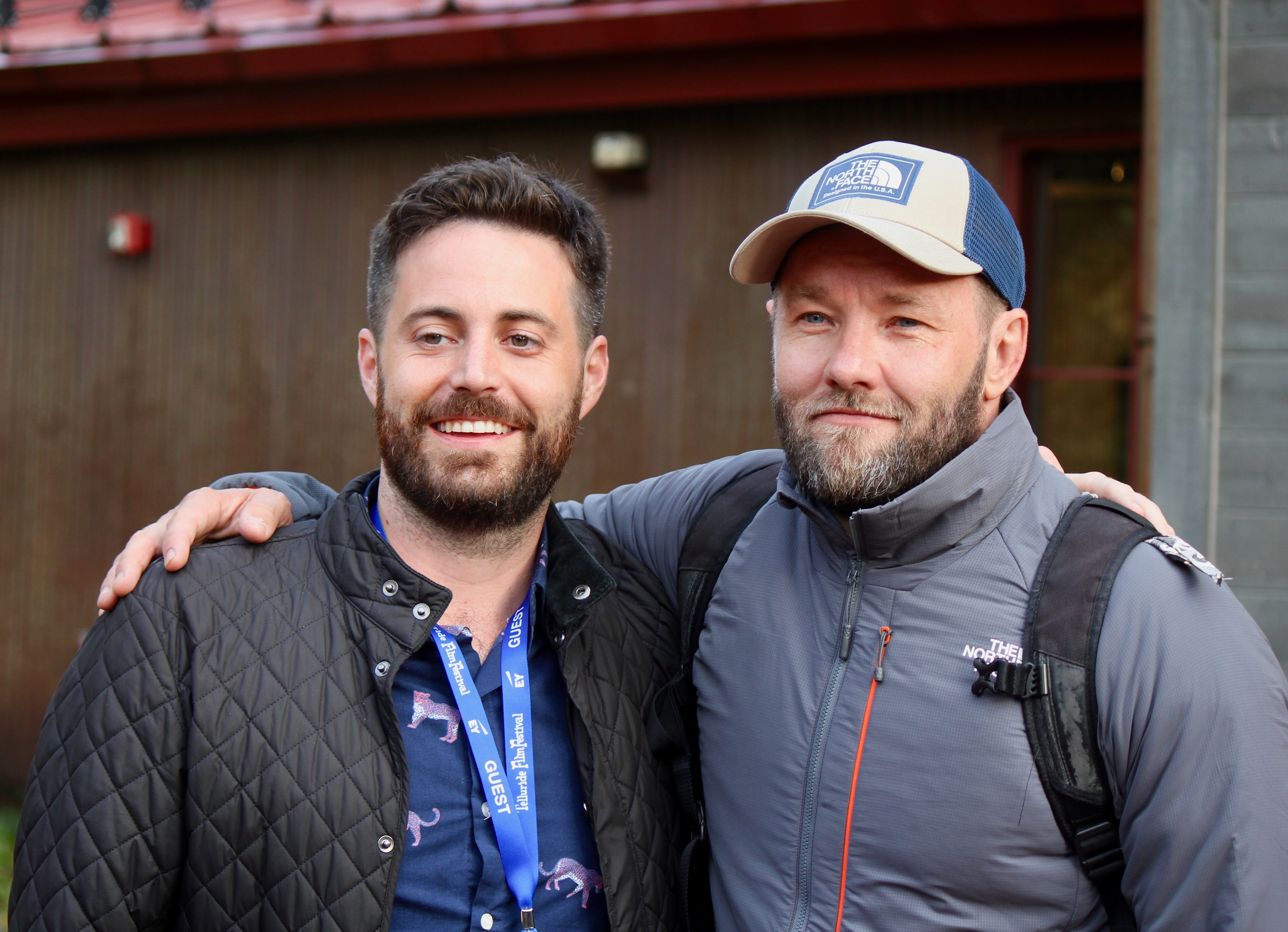
Garrard Conley and Joel Edgerton at Telluride Film Festival

In 2018, Joel Edgerton wrote and directed Boy Erased, a film adaptation of the memoir. Lucas Hedges stars as a character based on Conley, with Nicole Kidman and Russell Crowe in supporting roles as his conservative parents.
