= John Smid =

American former ex-gay leader

John J. Smid
- Occupation: Ex-Minister
- Known for: Love In Action
- Spouse: Larry McQueen

John J. Smid is the former director of the American ex-gay ministry Love in Action, a group that claims to convert lesbians and gay men to heterosexuality.

== Career ==
During his time directing Love in Action, Smid faced controversy over the organization's treatment of gay teens in their youth program "Refuge". Smid subsequently resigned his position in 2008, and in 2010 apologized for any harm he had caused, noting that his teen program "further wounded teens that were already in a very delicate place in life".

In 2011, three years after leaving Love In Action and stepping down from its leadership, Smid announced he was still homosexual and stated he had "never met a man who experienced a change from homosexual to heterosexual."

In 2012, Smid wrote and self-published the memoir Ex'd Out: How I Fired the Shame Committee.

In the 2018 film Boy Erased, based on the book of the same name, the character Victor Sykes, portrayed by Joel Edgerton, is based on Smid.

A November 2018 Radiolab podcast titled UnErased: Smid features Smid's life story.

== Personal life ==
Before claiming he had changed from homosexuality to heterosexuality, Smid lived for years married to a woman and fathering children. It was during this marriage that he said he was gay, divorcing his first wife in 1980. Four years following his divorce, Smid became a Christian and sought conversion from homosexuality to heterosexuality. He married a second time, but by 2011 said, “I would consider myself homosexual and yet in a marriage with a woman.” That year, he and his wife divorced. On November 16, 2014, Smid married a man, Larry McQueen. The couple married in Oklahoma, as same-sex marriage was not yet recognized in Texas, where they lived.
