= Brokeback Mountain (play) =

2023 play by Ashley Robinson

- West End Poster
- Book: Ashley Robinson (play); Annie Proulx (short story)
- Basis: Brokeback Mountain (short story); Brokeback Mountain
- Premiere: 18 May 2023: @sohoplace, London
- Productions: 2023 West End; 2026 Chicago

Brokeback Mountain is a 2023 play written by Ashley Robinson. It is an adaptation of an award-winning 1997 short story by Annie Proulx. The play has songs written by Dan Gillespie Sells and direction by Jonathan Butterell. It had its world premiere at @sohoplace in London's West End in May 2023.

== Production history ==
=== West End (2023) ===
In March 2023, it was announced that the show would make its world premiere in London's West End at the @sohoplace produced by Nica Burns, Adam Blanshay Productions, Lambert Jackson, Katy Lipson for Aria Entertainment and 42nd.Club (Phil Kenny, Marc Hershberg, Sharon Karmazin and Carol Auerbach). It was also announced that Mike Faist and Lucas Hedges will star as Jack and Ennis respectively. The show began previews on May 10, 2023, and officially opened on May 18 and its final show on August 12, 2023.

== Cast and characters ==
Character	West End	Chicago
Character	2023	2026
Ennis	Lucas Hedges	Harrison Ball
Jack	Mike Faist	Jack Cameron Kay
Balladeer	Eddi Reader	Kat Eggleston
Alma	Emily Fairn	Cordelia Dewdney
Older Ennis	Paul Hickey	—N/a
Joe/Bill/Jack's Father	Martin Marquez	Thomas Cox

== Reception ==
The show received mostly positive reviews from the critics.
