= Sheri Holman =

American novelist and screenwriter (born 1966)

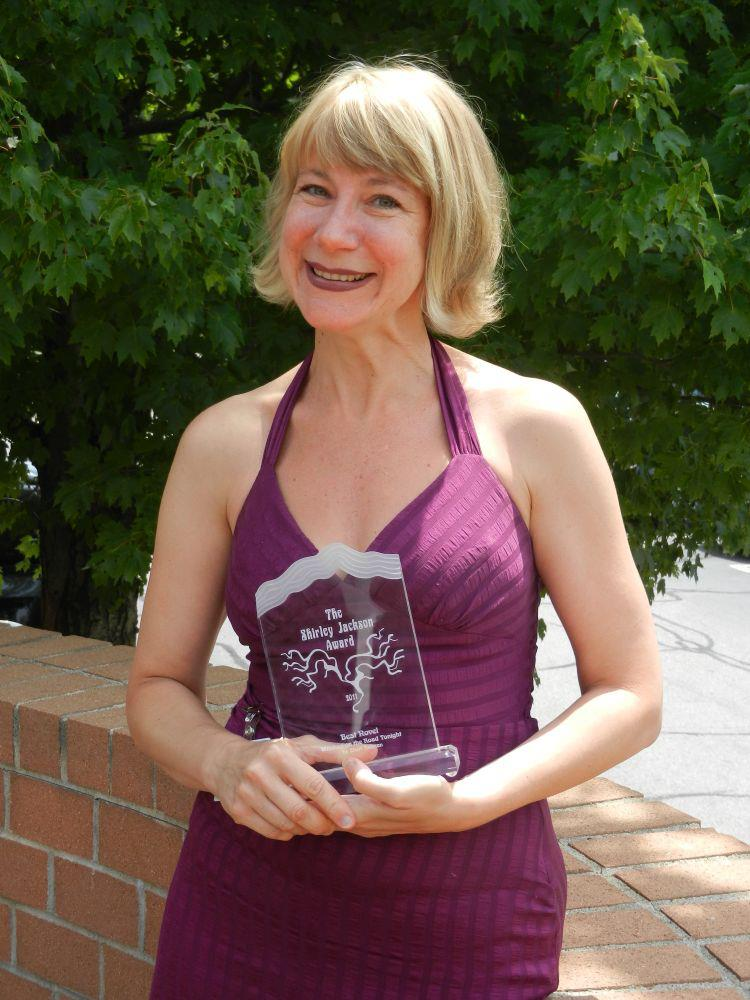
- Holman at Shirley Jackson Award, April 2012
- Born: June 1, 1966 (age 60); Hanover County, Virginia, U.S.
- Education: College of William & Mary
- Occupations: Novelist, screenwriter
- Writing career
- Genres: Fiction, Novel, Television
- Notable works: Witches on the Road Tonight (novel, 2011), The Dress Lodger (novel, 2000)

Sheri Holman (born June 1, 1966) is an American novelist and screenwriter.

== Biography ==
Holman was born in Hanover County, Virginia. Following graduation from the College of William & Mary in 1988 with a degree in theatre, she moved to New York. After transitioning from acting to various positions in the publishing industry, including several years as a temp at Penguin Books, Holman became the assistant to literary agent Molly Friedrich. It was during this time that she began writing her first novel, A Stolen Tongue, a mystery set along the route of a fifteenth-century religious pilgrimage. The debut novel was published by Grove/Atlantic in 1997 and subsequently translated into thirteen languages. This was followed by the bestselling The Dress Lodger, named a New York Times Notable Book of the Year in 2000, and a nominee for the International IMPAC Dublin Literary Award.

After publishing a young adult title in 2002, Holman returned with The Mammoth Cheese in 2003, which was a finalist for the UK Orange Prize for Fiction. Her most recent novel is Witches on the Road Tonight, named a New York Times Editors' Choice and to the best fiction of 2011 lists of the Boston Globe and The Globe and Mail. She is at work on a new novel involving a pediatric health worker in Eldoret, Kenya.

Holman was a writer and co-executive producer for the 2022-23 Showtime drama miniseries George & Tammy, and writer and executive producer on Palm Royale on Apple TV+.

In 2020, Holman was writer/producer on Filthy Rich, as well as the Fox 21 Television Studios/National Geographic Channel series Barkskins, based on the Annie Proulx novel. She spent three seasons writing on Longmire for Warner Horizon Television, which premiered on Netflix in Fall, 2015. She served as a staff writer on Emerald City on NBC. The Crooked Road, her television adaptation of Witches on the Road Tonight, is in development by Universal Television. Holman teaches in the Goldberg Department of Dramatic Writing at NYU Tisch

She is a founding member of the storytelling collective The Moth and serves on its curatorial board. Her stories have been featured on The Moth Podcast and the Peabody Award-winning Moth Radio Hour.

Holman lives with her family in Brooklyn, New York.

== Awards ==
- Orange Prize for Fiction, shortlist (2005): The Mammoth Cheese
- Independent Publisher Book Award, Gold Medal, Literary Fiction (2011): Witches on the Road Tonight
- Shirley Jackson Award, Best Novel (2011): Witches on the Road Tonight

== Bibliography ==
=== Novels ===
- A Stolen Tongue (1997)
- The Dress Lodger (2000)
- The Mammoth Cheese (2003)
- Witches on the Road Tonight (2011)

Children's literature

- Sondok: Princess of the Moon and Stars (2002)

=== Selected short works ===
- "Sheri Holman: An Author's Pilgrimage" in Boldtype (February, 1998)
- "Letters from Exile: Styron's Havanas in Camelot" in The Barnes and Noble Review (June 9, 2008)
- "Rescue Mission" in The Secret Currency of Love: The Unabashed Truth About Women, Money, and Relationships (2009)
- "The Starvation Experiment" in Exotic Gothic 5, Vol. I (2013)
- "The Divide" in My First Novel: Tales of Woe and Glory (2013)
