= Man-eating plant =

Fictional form of plant

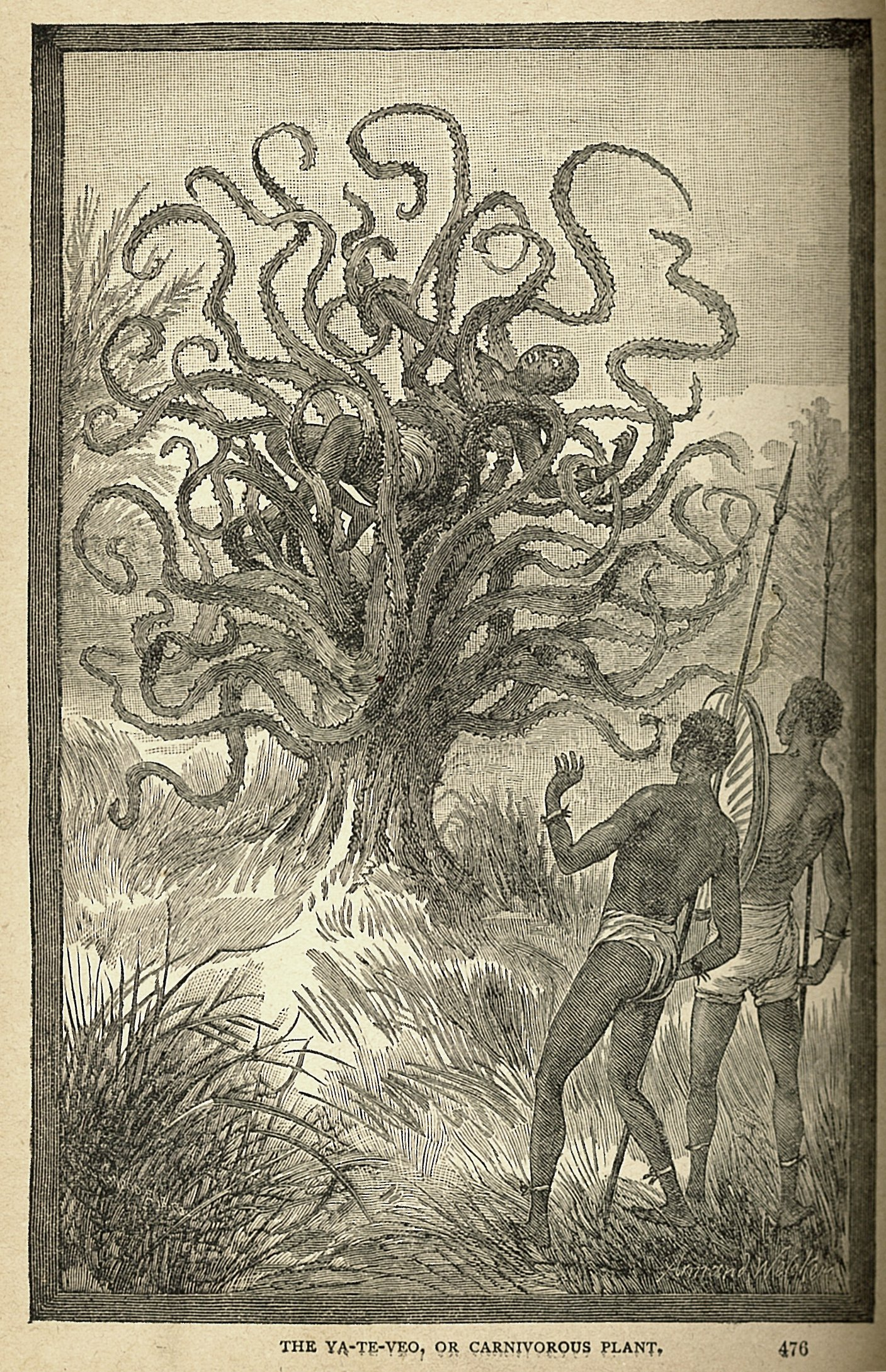
- Depiction of a man being consumed by a Yateveo ("I see you") carnivorous tree found in both Africa and Central America, from Sea and Land by J. W. Buel, 1887

Origin
- First attested: 1874
- Region: Africa and Central America
- Details: Lives in African and Central-American forests

A man-eating plant is a fictional form of carnivorous plant large enough to kill and consume a human or other large animal. The notion of man-eating plants came about in the late 19th century, as the existence of real-life carnivorous and moving plants, described by Charles Darwin in Insectivorous Plants (1875), and The Power of Movement in Plants (1880), largely came as a shock to the general population, who believed it was impossible for plants to consume animals or move under their own power. Authors began to exaggerate these abilities for dramatic effect, causing the proliferation of fiction about such plants.

== The Madagascar tree ==
The earliest known report of a man-eating plant originated as a literary fabrication written by journalist Edmund Spencer for the New York World. Spencer's article first appeared in the daily edition of the New York World on 26 April 1874, and appeared again in the weekly edition of the newspaper two days later. In the article, a letter was published by a purported German explorer named "Karl Leche" (also spelled as Karl or Carl Liche in later accounts), who provided a report of encountering a human sacrifice performed by the "Mkodo tribe" of Madagascar. This story was picked up by many other newspapers of the day, which included the South Australian Register of 27 October 1874, where it gained even greater notoriety. Describing the tree, the account related:

The slender delicate palpi, with the fury of starved serpents, quivered a moment over her head, then as if instinct with demoniac intelligence fastened upon her in sudden coils round and round her neck and arms; then while her awful screams and yet more awful laughter rose wildly to be instantly strangled down again into a gurgling moan, the tendrils one after another, like great green serpents, with brutal energy and infernal rapidity, rose, retracted themselves, and wrapped her about in fold after fold, ever tightening with cruel swiftness and savage tenacity of anacondas fastening upon their prey.

The hoax was given further publicity by Madagascar: Land of the Man-eating Tree, a book by Chase Osborn, who had been a Governor of Michigan. Osborn claimed that both the tribes and missionaries on Madagascar knew about the hideous tree, repeated the above Liche account, and acknowledged "I do not know whether this tigerish tree really exists or whether the bloodcurdling stories about it are pure myth. It is enough for my purpose if its story focuses your interest upon one of the least known spots of the world."

In his 1955 book, Salamanders and other Wonders, science author Willy Ley determined that the Mkodo tribe, Carl Liche, and the Madagascar man-eating tree all appeared to be fabrications: "The facts are pretty clear by now. Of course the man eating tree does not exist. There is no such tribe."

== Yateveo ==
In James W. Buel's Sea and Land (1889), the Yateveo plant is described as being native to Africa and South America, so named for producing a hissing sound similar to the Spanish phrase ya te veo (lit. 'I already see you'), and having poisonous "spines" that resemble "many huge serpents in an angry discussion, occasionally darting from side to side as if striking at an imaginary foe" which seize and pierce any creature coming within reach.

== The vampire vine ==
William Thomas Stead, editor of Review of Reviews, published a brief article in October 1891 that discussed a story found in Lucifer magazine, describing a plant in Nicaragua called by the natives the devil's snare. This plant had the capability "to drain the blood of any living thing which comes within its death-dealing touch." According to the article:

Mr. Dunstan, naturalist, who has recently returned from Central America, where he spent nearly two years in the study of the flora and the fauna of the country, relates the finding of a singular growth in one of the swamps which surround the great lakes of Nicaragua. He was engaged in hunting for botanical and entomological specimens, when he heard his dog cry out, as if in agony, from a distance. Running to the spot whence the animal's cries came. Mr. Dunstan found him enveloped in a perfect network of what seemed to be a fine rope-like tissue of roots and fibers... The native servants who accompanied Mr. Dunstan manifested the greatest horror of the vine, which they call "the devil's snare", and were full of stories of its death-dealing powers. He was able to discover very little about the nature of the plant, owing to the difficulty of handling it, for its grasp can only be torn away with the loss of skin and even of flesh; but, as near as Mr. Dunstan could ascertain, its power of suction is contained in a number of infinitesimal mouths or little suckers, which, ordinarily closed, open for the reception of food. If the substance is animal, the blood is drawn off and the carcass or refuse then dropped.

An investigation of Stead's review determined no such article was published in the October issue of Lucifer, and concluded that the story in Review of Reviews appeared to be a fabrication by the editor. The story in fact appeared in the September issue, preceded by a longer version in an 1889 newspaper describing Dunstan as a "well-known naturalist" from New Orleans.

== Literature and film ==
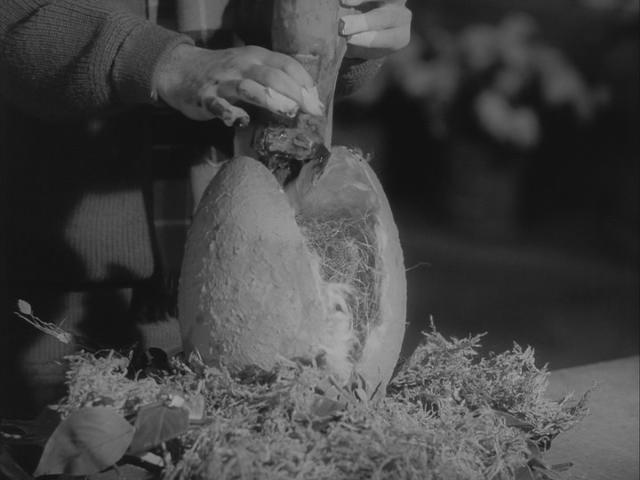
Audrey Jr. being fed in The Little Shop of Horrors (1960)

- "The Man-Eating Tree" (1881) by Phil Robinson (included in his book Under the Punkah) describes a "man-eating tree" found in Nubia.
- Indian writer Malladi Venkata Krishna Murthy's biological thriller Nattalostunnayi Jagratta features a man-eating tree in Madagascar.
- "The Flowering of the Strange Orchid" (1894) by H. G. Wells (originally published in Pall Mall Budget, August 2 and 9, 1894), about an orchid capable of sedating and draining the blood of a human.
- "The Purple Terror" (1899) by Fred M. White features parasitic vines with purple blossoms known as the "Devil's Poppy" that seize and poison animals.
- "Spanish Revenge" (1906) features a "Yateveo" in Mexico, resembling a large cactus with many long thorny arms, which attacks a Texan traveler.
- Two stories of the comic strip Dick Tracy (Mr Crime and Lt Teevo) feature man-eating plants.
- The film Maneater of Hydra (1967) features a mad scientist (Cameron Mitchell) who develops hybrid carnivorous and vampiric plants.
- In Get Smart's "Whats it all about Algie?" (1970), KAOS agent Algernon De Grasse (John Van Dreelen) tries to kill Maxwell Smart with a man-eating tree.
- In Conan the Buccaneer (1971), a black Amazon tribe uses a grove of man-eating trees called "Kulamtu" as a particularly cruel method of execution.
- Enemy Mine, a 1985 film, depicting two crash survivors living on an inhospitable planet, containing animal-eating plants.
- The Little Shop of Horrors, a 1960 film directed by Roger Corman, about a man-eating plant. There was also a musical, another movie and an animated series loosely based on the movie, that also featured a man-eating plant.
  - Little Shop of Horrors (musical), a 1982 musical based on the 1960 film
  - Little Shop of Horrors (film), a 1986 film adaptation of the musical, directed by Frank Oz
  - Little Shop, a 1991 animated TV series spin-off from the 1986 film created by Frank Oz.
- "The Sagebrush Kid" (2008) by Annie Proulx (a short story in Fine Just the Way It Is) features a sagebrush which grows to consume animals and humans after being "raised" and fed by a childless Wyoming couple.
- Shades of Grey: The Road to High Saffron (2012) by Jasper Fforde features a carnivorous yateveo tree. A "Peril Infoganda" video was released via YouTube to promote the novel, titled "How Not To Be Eaten By a Yateveo" The yateveo lore returned in the 2024 sequel, Red Side Story.
- Harry Potter and the Philosopher's Stone, by J. K. Rowling, includes a constrictor plant, known as "Devil's Snare" which entangles and crushes anything that exhibits movement within reach of its tendrils. Devil's Snare apparently does not consume its prey, as on at least one occasion the victim is discovered still whole after being killed by the plant.
- The Day of the Triffids, by John Wyndham, features as central antagonists the eponymous Triffids, carnivorous plants capable of locomotion, that fatally sting and eat people.
- The Hunger of Septopus (Septopus er Khide) by Satyajit Ray features a carnivorous plant with seven trunks and a mouth, that is indigenous to Nicaragua and was brought back and eventually nurtured in Kolkata.
- The Life of Pi, by Yann Martel, published 2001, includes a carnivorous tree on a floating island.
- The Ruins, story by Scott Smith, directed by Carter Smith, is a 2008 movie about a vine plant that kills and consumes humans.
- The Woman Eater (1958) is a British horror film based on the popular legend described above of a tribe that sacrifices women to a carnivorous tree, which is acquired by a mad scientist who must keep it fed while trying to find out its secrets.
- Hothouse is a 1962 science fiction novel by Brian Aldiss. It describes a far future Earth dominated by plant life, with many plant species omnivorous.
- In the episode "Tree People" (season 6, episode 9) of the TV series Grimm, a Kinoshimobe, or servant of a tree, appears. Kinoshimobes, who have a symbiotic relationship with Jubokko trees, are humanoid elementals made of plant materials with chlorophyll for blood. They ensnare their victims with vines before using one of their vines to stab them to death. They can make vines shoot out from their hands as well as from their feet. They are slow-moving, but strong creatures, able to lift a fully grown man.
- In Predator: Badlands (2025), carnivorous, man-eating vines are the first trial for Dek on the planet Genna, and the same vines become a significant narrative device throughout much of the story.

== See also ==
- Carnivorous plant – Plants that consume animals
- Human cannibalism – Practice of humans eating other humans
- Jubokko – Yōkai tree in Japanese folklore said to live on human blood
- Man-eating animal – Creature that preys on humans
- Old Man Willow – Evil character in Tolkien's fiction
- Puya chilensis – Bromeliad rumored to be capable of killing birds and sheep
