= Postcards (novel) =

1992 novel by Annie Proulx

- First edition cover
- Author: Annie Proulx
- Language: English
- Genre: Novel
- Publisher: HarperCollins
- Publication date: 1992
- Publication place: United States
- Media type: Print (hardback & paperback)
- Pages: 340 pp
- ISBN: 0-00-654668-4

Postcards is E. Annie Proulx's 1992 novel about the life and travels of Loyal Blood across the American West. Postcards has been likened by David Bradley to a Great American Novel. It is the predecessor to Proulx's award-winning The Shipping News. Postcards cuts between stories of Loyal's travels and the stories of his family back in Vermont, to whom he sends irregular postcards about his life and experiences. Loyal never leaves a return address, so is unable to hear back from his family and therefore misses all the news from home, including the death of his father and mother, the sale of the family farm, and the marriage of his sister to a virtual stranger.

The novel's content provides a personal view of America in the 20th century, dealing with themes of war, industrialization, conservation and the American Dream. It also provides a glimpse into the way a family unit is slowly destroyed due to this arrival of a new age. Fate is one of the chief themes of the novel: no matter how hard one works for a better life, fate may alter the outcome. Thus, the book has a naturalistic perspective.

Proulx wrote most of the novel while in residence at the Ucross Foundation in northern Wyoming, and moved to Wyoming a few years later.
