= The Weight of a Piano =

2019 novel by Chris Cander

- First edition (US)
- Author: Chris Cander
- Language: English
- Publisher: Alfred A. Knopf
- Publication date: 2019
- ISBN: 978-0-525-65467-4 (first edition, hardcover)
- Dewey Decimal: 813.6
- LC Class: PS3603.A53585 W45

The Weight of a Piano is a 2019 novel by Chris Cander, published by Knopf. In the United Kingdom it was published by Europa Editions.

== Story ==
The story follows a Blüthner piano that was owned in the 1960s by an Ekaterina Dmitrievna "Katya", who lives in Zagorsk, Russia, and in 2012 by an American woman named Clara Lundy, living in Bakersfield, California. The novel explains how the piano went from Russia to the United States.

Clara and a man who purchases her piano, Greg, have no living parents in the duration of the story. Alex Clark of The Observer wrote that "parental loss" is the "central subject".

== Reception ==
Clark concluded that The Weight of a Piano "is an interesting exploration of an abiding dilemma".

James Barron of The New York Times compared the novel's mixture of themes to using a Cuisinart and stated it is "immense, intense and imaginative."

Carol Memmott, in the Washington Post, described the story as "ably and convincingly told".

Beth Andersen, in Library Journal, praised the work, calling it "beautiful".

Publishers Weekly gave the book a starred review, calling it one of "PW's picks", and compared it to Accordion Crimes.

Kirkus Reviews described the book as "Deftly plotted and well written".

== See also ==
- A Gracious Neighbor - A 2022 novel by Cander
