= Bad Dirt: Wyoming Stories 2 =

- Author: Annie Proulx
- Language: English
- Genre: Short story collection
- Publisher: Simon & Schuster
- Publication date: 2004
- Publication place: United States
- ISBN: 978-0-7432-5799-2
- Preceded by: Close Range: Wyoming Stories
- Followed by: Fine Just the Way It Is: Wyoming Stories 3

Bad Dirt: Wyoming Stories 2 is a collection of short stories by Annie Proulx published in 2004. It was not as well received by critics in comparison with Proulx's 1999 Close Range: Wyoming Stories.

== Stories ==
- “The Hellhole”
- “The Indian Wars Refought”
- “The Trickle Down Effect”
- “What Kind of Furniture Would Jesus Pick?”
- “The Old Badger Game”
- “Man Crawling Out of Trees”
- “The Contest”
- “The Wamsutter Wolf”
- “Summer of the Hot Tubs”
- “Dump Junk”
- “Florida Rental”

== Selected story sketches ==
The collection consists of eleven stories, all set in Wyoming; Proulx moved to the state in the 1990s. Five of the eleven stories are set in the fictional Wyoming town of "Elk Tooth", a town of 80 inhabitants in which each individual "tries to be a character and with some success. There is little more to it than being broke, proud, ingenious and setting your heels against civilized society's pull". A number of the stories had previously been published in The New Yorker. "The Wamsutter Wolf" appeared in The Paris Review a few months before the collection was published.

=== The Hellhole ===
Creel Zmundzinski, a Wyoming Fish and Game warden, finds that a small patch in a roadside parking area will incinerate hunters without the correct licenses. In Pee-Wee, one of Elk Tooth's three bars, his best friend Plato Bucklew commends Zmundzinski for sending wrongdoers literally to Hell.

=== The Indian Wars Refought ===
An extended exposition about a family of small town Wyoming lawyers and polo players leads up to a narrative about a Native American woman who is employed to clear out the family's decaying office building.

The widow of the last lawyer marries Charlie Parrott, who is of Oglala Sioux descent. Parrott's daughter Linny is accepted by his new wife on the proviso that Linny clean through the lawyer family's archives and categorize what may be of value. Amongst the detritus she finds reels of the 1913 Essanay Studios film The Indian Wars Refought produced by William "Buffalo Bill" Cody. Linny is prompted to discover her hidden heritage: she reads Bury My Heart at Wounded Knee, and asks her father to take her back to the reservation he was born in. He declines: "She would get involved, and after a few years of passionate activism she might fall away from it and end up on urban sidewalks in the company of street chiefs and hookers".

=== The Trickle Down Effect ===
Elk Tooth resident and drinker at Elk Tooth's three bars (according to the book, "the Wyoming trickle down effect") Deb Sipple agrees to haul hay from Wisconsin to the drought-stricken ranch of "lady rancher" Fiesta Punch. Sipple tosses cigarette butts out the window of his flat-bed truck, igniting the hay and resulting in "the closest thing to a meteor ever seen in Elk Tooth... his truck a great fiery cylinder hurtling through the darkness".

=== What Kind of Furniture Would Jesus Pick? ===
Rancher Gilbert Wolfscale tries and fails to adapt to modern realities. His wife leaves him and his children have no interest in him or his farm. Despite what has been described as a "hokey title", it was critically received as one of the stronger stories in the collection.

=== The Old Badger Game ===
In what has been described as a "weird tale", three talking badgers gossip amongst themselves. One of them – an untenured Creative Writing professor – is convinced that a rancher's wife has fallen in love with him. When the rancher shoots at him, he fancies this is out of jealousy; "but then, he'd been denied tenure and was a little sour on things".

=== Man Crawling Out of Trees ===
Mitchell and Eugenie Fair are newcomers to Wyoming. Though both are initially attracted to life there for their own separate reasons, they grow apart rather than together in the new environment. The "man crawling out of trees" of the title is a skier with a broken leg who Eugenie Fair takes for a prowler instead of giving him aid, breaking a "cardinal rule" of the place.

=== The Contest ===
The men of Elk Tooth pass the long winter with a beard-growing contest. One contestant resorts to applying Viagra to encourage his beard.

=== The Wamsutter Wolf ===
Greybull-born Buddy Millar dislikes highways, preferring back roads, some the "serious bad dirt" of the title of the collection. Millar finds himself back in Wyoming, in Wamsutter, more a huge trailer park off the I-80 than a town.

== Critical reception ==
The stories set in Elk Tooth were variously described as "mere squibs" and "genuinely terrible". Character names in the short story collection, "quirky characters with names to match", include Orion Horncrackle, Creel Zmundzinski and Plato Bucklew from "The Hellhole", Deb Sipple and Fiesta Punch from "The Trickle Down Effect". The A.V. Club review of Bad Dirt described them as a "helpful guide through this uneven collection... The wackier they are, the more disposable the story."

"The Wamsutter Wolf" was awarded the 2004 Aga Khan Prize for Fiction. In an interview with The Paris Review in 2009, Proulx stated that she preferred her short fictions to her novels.
