= Job History =

- Short story by Annie Proulx
- Country: United States
- Language: English and spanish and others
- Genre: Short story

Publication
- Published in: Close Range: Wyoming Stories
- Publication type: Short story collection
- Publisher: 1140 d.c

"Job History" is part of a short story series, Close Range: Wyoming Stories by Annie Proulx. It takes place in the writer's hometown of Cora, Wyoming. The story follows the life of the main character, Leeland Lee, and his unsuccessful attempts to find employment. Radio news reports throughout the story relate to Leeland's struggles and disappointment. His lack of education and the unavailability of jobs in his hometown cause him to move often. His determination is commendable, but in the end his efforts are futile and he lives his life in discontent.

== Plot summary ==
Leeland Lee is an awkward-looking young boy, raised in a small town along with his five siblings. He quits high school at seventeen and marries his school mate Lori, whom he got pregnant. He gets a job at the local gas station, Egge's Service Station, pumping gas. The business, however, goes bankrupt and Leeland decides to join the army. He is stationed in Germany for six years where he is then discharged, and, once again, discontented and jobless. He returns to his hometown in Wyoming, where he gets a seasonal job as a worker for a fencing crew; this doesn't last long as he decides to move his family to Casper. He finds another job as a truck driver; meanwhile his new home is in a cramped trailer park. Lori gets pregnant again and Leeland quits his job and returns to Unique where his parents are. He decides to open a new business with his savings but fails miserably and the business goes into bankruptcy after a couple months. He finds another job as a construction worker but quits shortly afterward due to disagreements with his employer; meanwhile, more tragedies are heard on the news.

Leeland decides to try something different and takes a job at a meat processing factory, working for Old Man Brose. It turns out that he loves working with meat and has a talent for cutting precise pieces. Lori and Leeland end up signing a ten-year lease on the company while Mr. Brose takes a vacation. Things seem to be looking up as his eldest son graduated and signs up for the army; there's also good news on the radio. Their success, however, is very short lived as the economy goes into a recession and the company is sold. This does not bode well with Mr. Brose on his return from his trip.

Jobless and disappointed once again, Leeland and family move again where he does a series of odd jobs which included raising hogs with his father, truck driving and being a stay-at-home dad. None are successful but he continues to try to make things work. His son returns home, after being discharged, and proposes a plan for them to start a company raising hogs. Leeland is extremely excited but his son changes his mind and moves to Phoenix. Bad luck continues to follow Leeland as his mother dies and his wife is diagnosed with cancer and also pregnant again; shortly after, Lori dies and the family blames him. His youngest son is taken away and goes to live with Leeland's eldest sister. In the end, he finds a job working as a cook which surprisingly he is very good at. His son returns from Phoenix and decides they should open up a motorcycle repair shop.

== Symbolism ==
The news reports in this story seem to have some significance to this story as the author mentions it at every transition in Leeland's life. The various reports at first seem very random and irrelevant but a closer look tells the reader something more about the characters. One report says "a strange hole has appeared in the ozone layer" . After this bad news the family receives bad news of their own when the baby nearly dies from fever because of the long-distance it takes to get to the hospital. One point of view could be that human error causes many natural processes to go wrong. The constant pollution of the Earth results in the depletion of the Earth's ozone layer similar to Leeland's decision to feed the baby alcohol so that it would stop crying.

There is another news report stating then unfortunate incident of a cult killing their members by influencing them to drink poisonous Kool-Aid. This could be a reflection on how much effect human influences have on one's life. Leeland's insistence on having unprotected sex results in the conception of another baby. This creates more financial stress on the family, especially on his wife Lori. In the last sentence "nobody has time to listen to the news" reflects a dead-end in Leeland's life. there is no significant change in his future which could be a disappointing or a sign of relief. Disappointing in the sense that he would never become a successful, high earning man, or a sign that his life couldn't get any worse.

== Analysis ==
Annie Proulx is known for her melancholic stories about the lives of ordinary middle-class people. She continues this in "Job History" as we go through the life of Leeland Lee, a high school dropout without a career. "In each of her stories, Proulx manages to illustrate just how miserable the lives of her characters are without becoming maudlin." Even though the life of Leeland is depressing she doesn't add any emotion to her writing "when his wife dies, or when he loses yet another job, Proulx does not soften up anything about those events." In this story she merely states the facts in brief sentences, the reader is left to form their entire opinion on the story without subjective views of the writer.

Leeland seemed destined for a hard life. From his birth to his upbringing in a dysfunctional family, this foreshadows the bad decisions he would make and his unpreparedness for life. He gets his high school girlfriend pregnant and quits school at age seventeen. From there it was downhill for Leeland. Without proper education, he couldn't get a high-income job. He also had many children who made living matters even harder, having to support his wife and children with a meager income. He was determined, though, to find a job he was happy with, but when the opportunity came, the country went through a recession and he had to give up that dream. This story portrays what reality is like; that working hard doesn't guarantee you can make yourself successful. "For a tiny minority the leap from poverty to prosperity is a reality, but for the majority, as is the case with those in Close Range, life is a long, hard slog".
