= Barkskins (TV series) =

American drama television series

- Genre: Drama
- Created by: Elwood Reid
- Based on: Barkskins by Annie Proulx
- Countries of origin: United States; Canada
- Original languages: English; Wyandot; Mohawk
- No. of seasons: 1
- No. of episodes: 8

Production
- Executive producers: Elwood Reid; Scott Rudin; Eli Bush; Garrett Basch; David Slade
- Production companies: Elwood Reid Inc.; Fox 21 Television Studios

Original release
- Network: National Geographic
- Release: May 25 – June 15, 2020

Barkskins is an American drama television series, based on the novel of the same name by Annie Proulx, that premiered on May 25, 2020 on National Geographic. The series was filmed in Quebec. The village built for the series was later put up for sale.

== Premise ==
Barkskins chronicles "the arrival of English and French colonists to the New World through the stories of two immigrants in New France, René Sel and Charles Duquet, who work as wood-cutters ('Barkskins, the term for indentured servants’) and of their descendants."

== Cast ==
- Aneurin Barnard as Hamish Goames
- Christian Cooke as Rene Sel
- David Thewlis as Claude Trepagny
- David Wilmot as Constable Bouchard
- James Bloor as Charles Duquet
- Kaniehtiio Horn as Mari
- Lily Sullivan as Delphine
- Marcia Gay Harden as Mathilde Geffard
- Tallulah Haddon as Melissande
- Thomas M. Wright as Elisha Cooke
- Zahn McClarnon as Yvon
- Matthew Lillard as Gus Lafarge
- Domenic Di Rosa as Father Gabriel
- Eric Schweig as Chief Tehonikonhraken
- Leni Parker as Mother Sabrine

== Episodes ==
No.	Title	Directed by	Written by	Original release date	U.S. viewers (millions)
1	"New France"	David Slade	Elwood Reid	May 25, 2020	0.994
The two leading characters of the series are immigrants arriving in New France to work for three years in indentured servitude as punishment for crimes committed elsewhere. René (Christian Cooke) is a woodcutter — a barkskin, and Charles (James Bloor) is a thief who has no intention of serving his time. A nun, Mother Sabrine, and the young ladies who arrive on the same immigrant ship that carried René and Charles. The women are there to be groomed into proper women and subsequently married off.
2	"The Turtle King"	David Slade	Elwood Reid	May 25, 2020	0.723
Duquet escapes indentured servitude and finds himself at the mercy of the vast forest. Mathilde is given the task to protect the creek massacre survivors; Trepagny becomes vulnerable.
3	"The Sugared Plum"	Lukas Ettlin	Elwood Reid & Adam Glass	June 1, 2020	0.655
Mathilde takes charge of the inn, while the "Filles" prepare for the matchmaking dance. Trepagny joins the eligible men for a matchmaking session.
4	"The Law of Two"	Courtney Hunt	Elwood Reid & Kseniya Melnik	June 1, 2020	0.573
The Iroquois return to Wobik to collect their dead. Trepagny leads Melissande back to the Doma; Delphine embarks on a new journey with Pierre Gasquet.
5	"Buttermilk"	Darren Grant	Elwood Reid & Walter Kirn	June 8, 2020	0.762
Mathilde persuades Bouchard to re-establish his power and authority; Trepagny gets help for a dangerous mission; Delphine's fate changes course.
6	"The Wobble"	Dan Attias	Elwood Reid & Sheri Holman	June 8, 2020	0.586
The result of Trepagny and Bouchard's rescue attempt incites a war, leaving the Sel and Father Gabriel's fate in the balance and Cooke's loyalty is tested.
7	"Bees in a Bottle"	Louise Friedberg	Elwood Reid & Migizi Pensoneau	June 15, 2020	0.788
Trepagny is reunited with Melissande. Mathilde encourages Delphine to entertain Cooke's interest while he is tasked with retrieving the dead bodies.
8	"The Black Sun"	Lukas Ettlin	Elwood Reid & Jason Sack	June 15, 2020	0.622
Wedding preparations begin as winter looms, but Duquet's decision to make a deal with Goames could spell Wobik's end.

== Production ==
On January 6, 2016, it was announced during the Television Critics Association's annual winter press tour that National Geographic had partnered with Scott Rudin Productions to option the screen rights to Annie Proulx's then-forthcoming novel Barkskins.

On December 3, 2018, it was reported that National Geographic had given the production a series order for a first season consisting of eight episodes. The series was created by Elwood Reid who was also expected to executive produce alongside Scott Rudin, Eli Bush, and Garrett Basch. Additional production companies involved with the series were slated to consist of Fox 21 Television Studios. On February 10, 2019, it was announced that David Slade would direct the pilot episode of the series and serve as an executive producer.

== Reception ==
On Rotten Tomatoes, the series holds an approval rating of 55% based on 11 reviews with an average rating of 7.25/10. On Metacritic, the series has a weighted average score of 65 out of 100, based on 6 critics, indicating "generally favorable reviews". Critics and viewers also cited the inability to watch the National Geographic produced show on the NatGeo app as a contributing factors to lower than desirable viewer ratings.
