= That Old Ace in the Hole =

2002 novel by Annie Proulx

- First edition cover
- Author: Annie Proulx
- Language: English
- Genre: Novel
- Publisher: 4th Estate
- Publication date: 2002
- Publication place: United States
- Media type: Print (hardback & paperback)
- Pages: 359 pp
- ISBN: 0-00-715152-7

That Old Ace in the Hole is a 2002 novel by Annie Proulx.

== Plot ==
Bob Dollar was abandoned by his parents and was brought up by his eccentric uncle. Dollar is sent by his employer, the multinational "Global Pork Rind Corporation", to scout for locations for intensive hog farming in the Texas Panhandle. Dollar goes about the work of meeting local down-on-their-luck farmers to manipulate them into selling out. He bases his search in the fictional town of Woolybucket, named after the real tree species, Sideroxylon lanuginosum.

There he gets a job at Woolybucket's Old Dog restaurant, and moves into an old bunkhouse in local historian LaVon Fronk's ranch. The inhabitants of the town and the region's quirkiness and stubbornness work on the fundamentally decent Dollar. The ace in the hole of the title is Ace Crouch, who quietly leads Dollar to a "kind of small, quiet and personal redemption."

== Critical reception ==
Writing in The Observer, Adam Mars-Jones described the book as "richer in wishful thinking than in the hard knowledge that the author has so patiently acquired."
