= A Gracious Neighbor =

2022 novel by Chris Cander

- First edition (publ. Little A)
- Author: Chris Cander
- Language: English
- Publication date: 2022

A Gracious Neighbor is a 2022 novel by Chris Cander.

It is derived from the 1917 short story "A Jury of Her Peers," written by Susan Glaspell. Cander, who moved to West University Place, Texas in 2005, reworked the story by moving it into a setting that she "was comfortable with."

The novel is set in West University Place and uses crape myrtles as a symbol for what Cander has referred to "oppositional opinions".

Publishers Weekly praised the work, including the satire used, its "keen sense of place, and a feminist sensibility."

== See also ==
- The Weight of a Piano - A 2019 novel by Cander
