= Jubokko =

Yōkai tree in Japanese folklore

The Jubokko (Japanese: 樹木子; "tree child") is a yōkai tree in Japanese folklore that appears in many books related to Japanese yōkai, including Shigeru Mizuki's works.

According to folklore, it appears in former battlefields where many people have died, and its appearance does not differ that much from ordinary trees. Since it becomes a yōkai tree by sucking up large quantities of blood from the dead, it lives on human blood. When a human being happens to pass by, it supposedly captures the victim and, changing its branches into the shape of a tube, sucks the blood out of the victim. A Jubokko that sucks life out of human beings in such a way is said to always maintain a fresh appearance. When a Jubokko is cut, blood trickles out. It is said that a Jubokko branch could heal and decontaminate an injured person.

== Origin ==
Folklore scholars such as Kunio Yanagita and Iwao Hino, who wrote works such as "Youkai Stories" and "Vocabulary of Changes in Japanese Youkai", respectively, state in written works about folklore yōkai that there is no yōkai that became the origin of the Jubokko. A group of experts from a group called To Scholar Conference (と学会, to gakkai), run by yōkai scholars Natsuhiko Kyogoku and Tada Natsumi, writer Murakami Kenji, and SF writer Yamamoto Hiroshi, stated that there is no source of appearance for this yōkai tree and that it can be theorized that this yōkai is a fictional creature conceived by Shigeru Mizuki. Mizuki stated that he created around 30 different yōkai in his comic book GeGeGe no Kitaro, but he did not specify which among the yōkai described in his work were his original creations.

== See also ==
- List of legendary creatures from Japan
- Man-eating plant
