= Bird Cloud =

Bird Cloud is a memoir by American writer Annie Proulx published in 2011. The "Bird Cloud" of the title is the name Proulx gave to her house in Wyoming. Writing in The New York Times, Dwight Garner described the house as "a bit of a folly"because it is not habitable in winter. Proulx sold the property and moved to a home near Seattle, Washington in 2016.
