= The Mammoth Cheese (novel) =

2003 novel by Sheri Holman

- First edition cover (publ. Atlantic Monthly Press)
- Author: Sheri Holman
- Language: English
- Publisher: Atlantic Monthly
- Publication date: August 1, 2003
- Publication place: USA
- Pages: 448
- ISBN: 0-87113-900-6

The Mammoth Cheese is a novel by American author Sheri Holman, published in 2003 by Atlantic Monthly. The narrative follows events in a small Virginia community following the birth of eleven babies to an individual woman. It was shortlisted for the 2005 Women's Prize for Fiction.

== Summary ==
In the small, fictional community of Three Chimneys, Virginia, a woman prematurely gives birth to 11 babies. Press flock to cover the events, causing a ripple effect, resulting in a recreation of the Cheshire Mammoth Cheese.

== Reception ==
The Mammoth Cheese was well received by critics. January Magazine described the narrative as "superb storytelling" but criticized the book's title and cover design.

The Guardian favorably reviewed the book, calling Holman "an original of extreme quality."

Kirkus Reviews called the novel "all-around terrific."

Booklist also reviewed the novel.

== Awards ==
The Mammoth Cheese was shortlisted for the Women's Prize for Fiction in 2005.
