= Fine Just the Way It Is: Wyoming Stories 3 =

Book by Annie Proulx

Fine Just the Way It Is
- First edition cover
- Author: Annie Proulx
- Language: English
- Genre: Short stories
- Publisher: 4th Estate
- Publication date: 14 September 2008
- Publication place: United States
- Media type: Print (paperback); (hardback)
- Pages: 240 pp
- ISBN: 978-0-00-726973-0 (first edition)

Fine Just the Way It Is: Wyoming Stories 3 is a 2008 collection of short stories by Annie Proulx.

This is Proulx’s third volume of Wyoming stories, following her 1999 Close Range: Wyoming Stories and her 2004 Bad Dirt: Wyoming Stories 2.

== Stories ==
- “Family Man”
- “I’ve Always Loved This Place”
- “Them Old Cowboy Songs”
- “The Sage Brush Kid”
- “The Great Divide”
- “Deep-Blood-Greasy-Bowl”
- “Swamp Mischief"
- “Testimony of the Donkey”
- “Tits-Up in a Ditch”

== Selected story sketches ==
=== Family Man ===
The story is set in a Wyoming "Old Folks' Home" for old cowboys, ranchers and their womenfolk. Old cow-poke Ray Forkenbrock has skeletons in his closet he must talk about before he dies. The past is inescapable. Mid-way through relating his early life to his granddaughter, Forkenbrock realizes that one of his fellow residents is the woman he first had sex with 71 years before; a day later that same woman falls to her death in the Grand Canyon. Forkenbrock had discovered, at his father's funeral, that he was not his father's only son called Ray. He was in fact one of four: his father had four families, the children all named the same to avoid mistakes.

=== I've Always Loved This Place ===
Satan's personal assistant, one Duane Fork, busies himself spreading dust and sulfurous smells for his boss's return from a Milan design fair. The Devil is piqued by an article in The Onion reporting that a Tenth Circle of Hell had been added to accommodate Total Bastards.

=== Them Old Cowboy Songs ===
Rose and Archie are a young married couple—Archie is only 16—setting out to make a life for themselves. At first, things are idyllic: they are very much in love. But then Archie gets laid off from the ranch where he has been working and heads to Cheyenne to find a job, leaving Rose behind in their cabin with a baby on the way. He has to hide that he is married because the tyrant he works for would fire him if he knew, since married men tend to want time off to go visit their wives. He tries to write a letter to Rose but does not have the money for a stamp. Meanwhile, Rose is alone and miserable. There are complications with her pregnancy, and no way for her to get help. She finally buries the baby. Archie, after a fall in a bog, comes down with pneumonia and cannot work, so his boss fires him. Another hand tries to help Archie get home but they get caught in a blizzard and freeze to death. In the spring, a friend of Archie and Rose comes by and finds her mutilated body.

=== The Sagebrush Kid ===
A childless Wyoming couple transfer their affections first to a piglet, then to a chicken, and finally to a sagebrush they fancy to have the appearance of a child. They tend to and protect, the sagebrush, even feeding it bones and stray scraps of meat from their dinner-table. After the couples' passing, the shrub, now grown to the height of a fair-sized tree, is used to human attention, and meat. It consumes livestock, then soldiers, then a local medico, railroad men, surveyors, and a botanist come to investigate its unusual height and luxuriance.

=== Tits-Up in a ditch ===
She realized that every ranch she passed had lost a boy, lost them early and late, boys smiling, sure in their risks, healthy, tipped out of the current of life by liquor and acceleration, rodeo smashups, bad horses, deep irrigation ditches, high trestles, tractor rollovers and “unloaded” guns. Her boy, too. This was the waiting darkness that surrounded ranch boys, the dangerous growing up that canceled their favored status. The trip along this road was a roll call of grief.—Annie Proulx, from “Tits-Up in a Ditch”

== Critical reception ==
Delia Falconer described the stories as a "patchy collection, much less satisfying than Close Range". The stories set in Hell have also been criticized as—while being witty and well-written—ill-fitted to a book of Wyoming stories.

“In her fiction, she has shown more interest in men than women because, she explains, men in rural communities tend to be the ones who get out and do things. But it’s also true that at this point in her life most of her friends are men.”—Los Angeles Times staff writer Susan Salter Reynolds.

Novelist and critic Joyce Carol Oates provides this assessment of the collection:

Like a flash flood rushing along a normally meandering stream, Annie Proulx’s most characteristic short stories move with a deceptive sort of sinister casualness, before the point of impact, and of disaster—but “disaster” for Proulx, as for her kinsman-contemporary Cormac McCarthy, whose quasi-mystical western territory is to the south (New Mexico, Texas, Mexico) of Proulx’s photo-realist Wyoming territory, is likely to be tersely and ironically noted, as the fall of a sparrow might be noted, one more event in the hard implacable heart of Nature.

Irish Times literary critic Molly McCloskey considers the collection an uneven effort, ranking “Them Old Cowboy Songs” and “The Great Divide” as “extremely fine stories” while identifying “two that should never have been included,” namely, those set in Hell: “Their inclusion in the collection does neither the writer nor the reader justice.”

== Sources ==
- McCloskey, Molly. 2008. "Life and Death in Wyoming" Irish Times, September 20, 2008.https://www.irishtimes.com/news/life-and-death-in-wyoming-1.939989 Accessed 20 August 2025.
- Oates, Joyce Carol. 2008. "In Rough Country." The New York Review, October 23, 2008.https://www.nybooks.com/articles/2008/10/23/in-rough-country/ Accessed 20 August 2025.
- Reynolds, Susan Salter. 2008. “Writers no longer at home on range.” Los Angeles Times, October 18, 2008.https://www.latimes.com/archives/la-xpm-2008-oct-18-et-proulx18-story.html Accessed 23 August 2025.
