= The Shipping News (film) =

2001 film by Lasse Hallström

- Theatrical release poster
- Directed by: Lasse Hallström
- Screenplay by: Robert Nelson Jacobs
- Based on: The Shipping News by E. Annie Proulx
- Produced by: Irwin Winkler; Linda Goldstein Knowlton; Leslie Holleran
- Starring: Kevin Spacey; Julianne Moore; Judi Dench; Scott Glenn; Rhys Ifans; Pete Postlethwaite; Cate Blanchett
- Cinematography: Oliver Stapleton
- Edited by: Andrew Mondshein
- Music by: Christopher Young
- Production company: Miramax Films
- Distributed by: Miramax Films
- Release date: December 25, 2001
- Running time: 111 minutes
- Countries: United States; Canada
- Language: English
- Budget: $38 million
- Box office: $24.6 million

The Shipping News is a 2001 romantic drama film directed by Lasse Hallström from a screenplay by Robert Nelson Jacobs, based on the 1993 novel of the same name by E. Annie Proulx. It stars Kevin Spacey, Julianne Moore, Judi Dench, Scott Glenn, Rhys Ifans, Pete Postlethwaite, and Cate Blanchett.

The plot follows the emotionally beaten Quoyle, who moves with his daughter from Upstate New York to his ancestral home in a small Newfoundland fishing village.

The film was theatrically released in the United States and Canada on December 25, 2001, by Miramax Films. It received mixed reviews from critics and was a box-office bomb, grossing only $24.6 million worldwide against a $38 million budget. At the 55th British Academy Film Awards, Spacey and Dench were nominated for Best Actor in a Leading Role and Best Actress in a Supporting Role, respectively. The film also received two nominations at the 59th Golden Globe Awards and two nominations at the 7th Critics' Choice Awards, including Best Picture.

== Plot ==
When Quoyle was a young boy, his father Guy tossed him into a lake, expecting him to swim naturally. Images of flailing in water and nearly drowning often resurface in Quoyle's memory when he is under stress.

Quoyle, now an ink setter at a small newspaper in Poughkeepsie, New York, lives a lonely life. He becomes infatuated with and marries a vivacious local woman named Petal. She is an unfaithful wife and negligent mother to their six-year-old daughter, Bunny. Petal runs off with a lover, taking Bunny with her. Soon after, Petal and her boyfriend are killed in a car accident. The police return Bunny to Quoyle, informing him that Petal had sold her to a black market adoption operation for $6,000.

Shortly before those events, Quoyle's elderly parents die by suicide together. Quoyle's aunt, Agnis Hamm, arrives to pay her respects to her late half-brother, though her real motive is to steal Guy's ashes (which she later dumps down an outhouse hole and urinates on). Agnis is moving to the ancestral family home in Newfoundland, which has been abandoned for 44 years. She agrees to stay a few more days to help Quoyle through his recent turmoil, then persuades him to move to Newfoundland with her.

While struggling to build a new life, restore the derelict house, and take care of Bunny, Quoyle meets Wavey Prowse, a widow whose young son, Harry, has a learning disability. They gradually develop a deepening relationship. Wavey eventually admits she pretends to be widowed, ashamed that her philandering husband left when she was pregnant.

Quoyle learns that the ancient Quoyles were pirates who ran ships aground and savagely pillaged them. When those Quoyles were driven out, they moved their house over a frozen lake to its present location, now known as Quoyle's Point. Quoyle's cousin Nolan, an old hermit, reveals that young Agnis was raped and impregnated by her teenaged half-brother (Quoyle's father), resulting in an abortion.

Quoyle applies for an ink setter job at the Gammy Bird. Owner and publisher Jack Buggit instead hires him as a reporter covering auto wrecks and the town's shipping news. With no journalism experience, Quoyle struggles to produce decent articles, incurring managing editor Tert Card's constant scorn.

Reporter Billy Pretty tutors and encourages Quoyle. When Quoyle's article about a millionaire's vintage yacht docked in town is popular with readers, Jack assigns him a weekly column profiling an interesting boat in port. Meanwhile, Agnis resumes her former occupation as a boat upholsterer to help support the family. She later confides to Quoyle that the woman she loved died six years earlier from leukemia.

Rather than running his newspaper full time, Jack Buggit commercially fishes to prevent his adult son Dennis, who nearly died at sea, from obtaining his own commercial license, which are limited. Jack drowns while securing his boat in an oncoming storm. During the funeral wake at the Buggit house, shock and chaos erupts when Jack miraculously revives from a coma-like state caused by hypothermia.

Jack gives Dennis his fishing license, believing the generational curse of Buggits dying at sea has been broken. After Jack's revival, Bunny is upset and angry at Quoyle, believing Petal could also have been "awakened". However, she finally accepts her mother's death.

Agnis, Quoyle, and Bunny have been living in town during the winter months while their house is renovated. On the night of the big storm, Bunny awakes and can "see" the house at Quoyle's point being blown away. When the family drives to their property, they discover the house is gone, symbolically freeing them from the dark Quoyle legacy.

== Cast ==
- Kevin Spacey as Quoyle
- Julianne Moore as Wavey Prowse
- Judi Dench as Agnis Hamm
- Cate Blanchett as Petal
- Pete Postlethwaite as Tert Card
- Scott Glenn as Jack Buggit
- Rhys Ifans as Beaufield Nutbeem
- Gordon Pinsent as Billy Pretty
- Jason Behr as Dennis Buggit
- Larry Pine as Bayonet Melville
- Jeanetta Arnette as Silver Melville
- Katherine Moennig as Grace Moosup
- Marc Lawrence as Cousin Nolan
- John Dunsworth as Guy Quoyle

== Production ==
The film, while broadly following the plot of the book, makes several changes; notably, Quoyle is obese and has two daughters in the novel, but in the film he has only one daughter and is of average build. He is only a timid ink setter in the film and he does not begin writing as a reporter until after he arrives in Newfoundland. In the novel, he is already a journalist. Another difference is that several characters, such as the younger Buggit family, are deleted or merged.

The film was originally to be directed by Fred Schepisi, with John Travolta in the lead male role.

== Home media ==
The film was released on DVD and VHS in the United States on June 18, 2002, by Miramax Home Entertainment. The DVD edition featured a widescreen presentation in a 2.35:1 aspect ratio with English 5.1 Dolby Digital audio. Special features included a photo archive, a featurette titled "Dive Beneath the Surface of the Shipping News", and a commentary track with director Lasse Hallström, screenwriter Robert Nelson Jacobs, and producers Leslie Holleran and Rob Cowan.

In 2010, Miramax was sold by The Walt Disney Company (their owners since 1993), with the studio being taken over by private equity firm Filmyard Holdings that same year. Filmyard sublicensed the home media rights for several Miramax titles to Echo Bridge Entertainment. On May 3, 2011, Echo Bridge reissued The Shipping News on DVD. Filmyard primarily licensed lower profile Miramax titles to Echo Bridge, with Miramax's high profile titles being licensed to Lionsgate Home Entertainment. Echo Bridge lost the rights to distribute any Miramax titles on home video in 2014, and on June 16, 2015, The Shipping News received a Blu-ray release from Lionsgate rather than Echo Bridge.

Filmyard Holdings sold Miramax to Qatari company beIN Media Group during March 2016. In April 2020, ViacomCBS (now known as Paramount Skydance) acquired the rights to Miramax's library, after buying a 49% stake in the studio from beIN. The Shipping News was one of the 700 titles Paramount acquired in the deal. Paramount Home Entertainment reissued the film on DVD and Blu-ray on April 12, 2022, with this being one of many Miramax titles that they reissued around this time.

== Reception ==
=== Box office ===
The Shipping News grossed $11,434,216 in the United States and Canada, and $13,256,225 in other territories, for a worldwide total of $24,690,441.

=== Critical response ===
On the review aggregator website Rotten Tomatoes, 54% of 131 critics' reviews are positive, with an average rating of 5.8/10. The website's consensus reads: "Though solidly made and acted, The Shipping News is rather heavy-handed and dull, especially given the nature of its protagonist." Metacritic, which uses a weighted average, assigned the film a score of 47 out of 100, based on 31 critics, indicating "mixed or average" reviews.

Stephen Holden of The New York Times stated, "Although the misconception of Mr. Spacey's character gives The Shipping News a hopelessly mushy center, the surrounding performances lend the movie some ballast" and "The Shipping News is finally too efficient for its own good. Instead of giving you the book, it leaves you with the unfulfilled sense of having leafed through an elegant, studiously captioned photo essay of the same material."

Kenneth Turan of the Los Angeles Times wrote, "The nominally emotional moments feel unearned, partially because many of the book's edges and eccentricities have been softened, and the film's "we face up to things we're afraid of because we can't go around them" philosophy is not particularly inspired. All that's left is the severe beauty of Newfoundland, which catches the eye but, like the rest of the proceedings, does little for the soul."

Rita Kempley of The Washington Post opined that Lasse Hallström "ably brings the communities to life, though this film has neither the tastiness of the one nor the bite of the other. For better or worse, it smells of salt air, squid burgers and fishing boats. It's worth seeing at the very least because it is so different from standard Hollywood fare."

Peter Bradshaw of The Guardian described The Shipping News as "a profoundly tiresome, unconvincing, formulaic emotional blockbuster with some of the most outrageous accents" and stated, "This movie has an Irving-esque habit of mixing sugary material with stuff like incest, rape, suicide. It all leaves a very strange taste in the mouth, and fails to convince that this slushy tale is anything other than a strident, uninteresting bore."

=== Won ===
- Florida Film Critics Association:
  1. Best Supporting Actress (Cate Blanchett)
- National Board of Review:
  1. Best Supporting Actress (Cate Blanchett)

=== Nominated ===
- Art Directors Guild (ADG):
  1. Excellence in Production Design Award Feature Film – Contemporary Film
- BAFTA Awards:
  1. Best Actor in a Leading Role (Kevin Spacey)
  2. Best Actress in a Supporting Role (Judi Dench)
- Berlin International Film Festival:
  1. Golden Berlin Bear (Lasse Hallström)
- Broadcast Film Critics Association:
  1. Best Composer (Christopher Young)
  2. Best Film
- Golden Globe Awards:
  1. Best Actor – Motion Picture Drama (Kevin Spacey)
  2. Best Original Score (Christopher Young)
- Screen Actors Guilds (SAG):
  1. Outstanding Performance by a Female Actor in a Supporting Role (Judi Dench)
- USC Scripter Award:
  1. USC Scripter Award (Robert Nelson Jacobs and E. Annie Proulx)
- Young Artist Awards:
  1. Best Ensemble in a Feature Film
