= Accordion Crimes =

1996 novel by E. Annie Proulx

- First edition
- Author: E. Annie Proulx
- Language: English
- Publisher: Scribner
- Publication date: 1996
- Publication place: United States
- Media type: Print
- ISBN: 0-684-83154-6
- OCLC: 37039967

Accordion Crimes is a 1996 novel by American writer E. Annie Proulx. It followed her Pulitzer Prize-winning 1993 work The Shipping News and was shortlisted for the 1997 Orange Broadband Prize for Fiction.

== Plot details ==
The novel begins in the nineteenth century, as a Sicilian accordion-maker comes to the United States in search of better opportunities. He is shot by an anti-Italian lynch mob, and his accordion falls into the hands of several other owners, many of whom meet painful ends themselves. The accordion traverses a continent, traveling to Louisiana, Iowa, Texas, Maine, Illinois, Montana, and Mississippi.

== Theater ==
Accordion Crimes inspired a play called Vaarallinen Harmonikka (Dangerous Accordion) in Finland. Writer Seppo Parkkinen and director Fiikka Forsman adapted the novel for the Turku City Theatre. The play premiered on September 9, 2011.
