= Heart Songs and Other Stories =

Book by Annie Proulx

Heart Songs
- Reprint of 1988 1st edition
- Author: Annie Proulx
- Language: English
- Publisher: Scribner
- Publication date: March 17, 1995
- Publication place: United States
- Media type: Print (paperback)
- Pages: 224 pp
- ISBN: 978-0020360759

Heart Songs and Other Stories is a collection of short fiction by Annie Proulx first published in 1988 by Simon & Schuster as Heart Songs. This paperback edition was published in 1995 by Scribner in 1995. Most of the stories in the 1994 collection had previously been published as Heart Songs and Other Stories in 1988.

== Stories ==
Those stories originally published in periodicals are indicated where they “appeared in somewhat different form.”

- On the Antler (Harrowsmith, 1983)
- Stone City (Gray's Sporting Journal, 1979)
- Bedrock
- A Run of Bad Luck (Ploughshares, Vol. 13, No. 2/3 (1987), pp. 177–189, 1987)
- Heart Songs (Esquire, October 1, 1986)
- The Unclouded Day
- In the Pit
- The Wer-Trout (Esquire, June 1, 1982)
- A Country Killing (The Atlantic Monthly, November 1994)
- Negatives

== Reception ==
Kirkus reviews offers a mixed assessment of Proulx’ s first collection of short stories, describing them as “expertly commanding in their detail of the daily life of farming and hunting, but offering little by way of originality of idea.” The reviewer closes with the caveat: “Sharp-eyed in their execution, but often less so in what lies beneath.”

Los Angeles Times critic Charles Solomon observes:

Proulx writes with a rare grace that never calls attention to itself but leaves the reader to savor such phrases as, “ . . . the afternoon light had a dying, year’s end quality, a rich apricot color as though it fell through a cordial glass onto an oak table, the kind of day hunters remember falsely as October.”

== Sources ==
- Proulx, Annie. 1995. Heart Songs and Other Stories. Scribner Paperback Fiction, New York. ISBN 0020360754
- Solomon, Charles. 1990. Los Angeles Times, March 4, 1990. https://www.latimes.com/archives/la-xpm-1990-03-04-bk-2478-story.html Accessed October 6, 2025.
