= Close Range: Wyoming Stories =

1999 short story collection by E. Annie Proulx

- First edition cover
- Author: Annie Proulx
- Language: English
- Publisher: Scribner
- Publication date: May 10, 1999
- Publication place: United States
- Media type: Print (hardback & paperback)
- Pages: 288 pp
- ISBN: 0-684-85221-7
- OCLC: 40595315
- Dewey Decimal: 813/.54 21
- LC Class: PS3566.R697 C58 1999

Close Range: Wyoming Stories is a 1999 collection of short fiction by Annie Proulx, beginning in 1997. The stories are set in the desolate landscape of rural Wyoming and detail the often grim lives of the protagonists.

The collection was shortlisted for the Pulitzer Prize for Fiction.

The best known story from the collection is "Brokeback Mountain", which was previously published as a 64-page novella in 1998. The story was the basis for Ang Lee's 2005 film, Brokeback Mountain.

“The Half-Skinned Steer” was selected by novelist John Updike for inclusion in The Best American Short Stories of the Century (1999).

== Stories ==
- "The Half-Skinned Steer"
- "The Mud Below"
- "Job History"
- "The Blood Bay"
- "People in Hell Just Want a Drink of Water"
- "The Bunchgrass Edge of the World"
- "Pair a Spurs"
- "A Lonely Coast"
- "The Governors of Wyoming"
- "55 Miles to the Gas Pump", a brief vignette about a rancher's wife who discovers the corpses of missing women in the attic
- "Brokeback Mountain"

== Reception ==
Observing that “Proulx doesn't use language; she goads it,” Irish Times literary critic Eileen Battersby ranks the collection as a whole less impressive than Proulx’s first volume, Heart Songs (1988). Battersby reserves special praise for “Brokeback Mountain,” calling it a “masterpiece.”

“The elements of unreality, the fantastic and improbable, color all of these stories as they color real life. In Wyoming not the least fantastic situation is the determination to make a living ranching in this tough and unforgiving place.”—Annie Proulx on Close Range: Wyoming Stories.

Julie Scanlon, writing in the Journal of Narrative Theory, comments on the limits of Proulx’s literary realism:

It would be over-generalizing to state that Proulx’s style is unequivocally realist…Proulx’s fictions can shift into magical realism on occasion. For example, stories in Close Range contain talking tractors and a seemingly magical pair of spurs, which are presented without a blink of recognition that they are fantastical. (“The Bunchgrass Edge of the World” and “Pair a Spurs”)

== Sources ==
- Battersby, Eileen (July 1, 2000). "Close Range, by Annie Proulx (Fourth Estate, £6.99 in UK)". The Irish Times.
- Proulx, Annie (1999). Close Range: Wyoming Stories. New York: Scribners. ISBN 0-684-85221-7.
- Scanlon, Julie (2008). "Why Do We Still Want To Believe? The Case of Annie Proulx". Journal of Narrative Theory (Realism in Retrospect (Winter 2008)). 38 (1): 86–110.
- Updike, John; Kenison, Katrina (2000). The Best American Short Stories of the Century. New York: Houghton-Mifflin Company. ISBN 978-0395843673.
