= The Shipping News =

1993 novel by E. Annie Proulx

- First edition
- Author: E. Annie Proulx
- Language: English
- Genre: Novel
- Publisher: Scribner
- Publication date: 1993
- Publication place: United States
- Media type: Print (hardback & paperback)
- ISBN: 0-684-19337-X (first edition, hard)
- OCLC: 26502801
- Dewey Decimal: 813/.54 20
- LC Class: PS3566.R697 S4 1993

The Shipping News is a novel by American author E. Annie Proulx and published by Charles Scribner's Sons in 1993. It won the Pulitzer Prize for Fiction, the U.S. National Book Award, as well as other awards. It was adapted as a film of the same name which was released in 2001.

== Plot summary ==
The story revolves around Quoyle, a newspaper reporter from upstate New York, whose father had emigrated from Newfoundland. Quoyle's distant parents have recently committed suicide, and his estranged wife, Petal, has died in a car accident with another man. As a result Quoyle decides to relocate his two young girls to their ancestral home in Newfoundland. His paternal aunt, Agnis Hamm, convinces him to make a new beginning and they move into Agnis's childhood home, an empty and abandoned house on Quoyle's Point. Quoyle finds work as a reporter for the Gammy Bird, the local newspaper in Killick-Claw, a small town. The Gammy Bird's editor asks him to cover traffic accidents and also the shipping news, documenting the arrivals and departures of ships from the local port. His reporting develops as Quoyle's signature column.

Over time, Quoyle learns deep and disturbing secrets about his ancestors that emerge in strange ways. As Quoyle builds his new life in Newfoundland, he is transformed. He creates a rewarding job, makes friends and begins a relationship with a local woman, Wavey Prowse.

== Ashley's influence ==
In her acknowledgments, Proulx states, "And without the inspiration of Clifford W. Ashley's wonderful 1944 work, The Ashley Book of Knots, which I had the good fortune to find at a yard sale for a quarter, this book would have remained just a thread of an idea." Ashley's illustrations and quotes are used as chapter headings throughout the book. Some names in the book are taken from knots, for example "Killick hitch" and coil. Coil also refers to "quoyle", the protagonist's name, a coil of rope only one layer thick, flat, "so that it may be walked on ..." This metaphor sums up Quoyle's relationship with the world around him in the novel's first half. Proulx also adopts a unique writing style using fragments and detailed descriptions.

== Awards ==
- Pulitzer Prize for Fiction, 1994
- National Book Award for Fiction, 1993
- Irish Times International Fiction Prize, 1993

== Critical reception ==
On November 5, 2019, the BBC News listed The Shipping News on its list of the 100 most inspiring novels.
