= Barkskins =

2016 novel by Annie Proulx

- First Scribner hardcover edition June 2016
- Author: Annie Proulx
- Language: English
- Genre: Historical fiction
- Publisher: Charles Scribner's Sons
- Publication date: 2016
- Publication place: United States
- Media type: Print
- Pages: 736 (first edition)
- ISBN: 978-0-7432-8878-1
- LC Class: PR3566.R697 B37 2016
- Website: Official website

Barkskins is a 2016 novel by American writer Annie Proulx. It tells the story of two immigrants to New France, René Sel and Charles Duquet, and of their descendants. It spans over 300 years and witnesses the deforestation of the New World from the arrival of Europeans into the contemporary era of global warming.

== Plot ==
The eponymous "barkskins" are indentured servants, transported from Paris slums to the wilds of New France in 1693, "... to clear the land, to subdue this evil wilderness," (p. 17) according to their master, a seigneur. The two men are contracted for three years of service to earn land of their own, but Charles Duquet runs away at the first opportunity, seeking to make a fortune for himself in the fur trade or by any means he can. René Sel, on the other hand, dutifully wields the axe clearing farmland for the master. Later, he is forced to marry the master’s cast off Mi’kmaq woman, Mari, a healer who gives him children. The Sel family heritage is thus Indigenous and working class.

Duquet, luckily surviving his escape through the wilderness, has a fortune to make, mostly on furs and lumber, and by swindling others whenever he can get away with it. Only then will he marry the daughter of a Dutch business partner, open an office in Boston, therefore Anglicizing the family name to Duke, and father or adopt the boys who will build the Duke & Sons timber empire after him.

All the while, for the Sel family, there is unceasing discontent. The young are always seeking their future as First Nations people in a whiteman's world. Indigenous lumbermen, for example, were always recruited for river work balancing on the longest logs rushing down a river where an awkward move could get a man crushed before he drowned.(p. 299)

== Major themes ==
=== Nature ===
Human struggles with nature are a recurring theme in Annie Proulx's books. About the forest in Barkskins, Proulx said, "It's the underpinning of life. Everything is linked to the forest. This is but one facet of larger things, like climate change and the melting of the ice. So deforestation is part of a much, much larger package."

=== Borders ===
As noted in her memoir, Bird Cloud, Annie Proulx grew up in New England, attended college in Canada, and had a lifelong practice of spending summers in Newfoundland and winters in the States. Thus, she was well acquainted with the geography of the novel and familiar with national and cultural borderlands. Proulx herself descended from English Americans on her mother's side and French Canadians on her father's, which makes her "mixed", although not to the same degree as the Sels in Barkskins. For the Sel family, the whiteman's cultural borders were closed to them in many ways because the borders of their homelands were never closed enough.

== Reception ==
With few exceptions, reviewers praised the novel particularly with regard to the brilliance of Annie Proulx’s prose, the intimately detailed scenes by which she reveals the complex inner lives of her characters, and/or breathtaking scenes of fearful destruction as well as awesome beauty. The forests and deforestation of the New World underlie the epic scope of the book, while human adventures range beyond the central concerns of forest ecology and the logging industry. The narrative is partitioned into books that turn the reader’s attention to one family or another across generations.

Some reviewers thought the sweeping epic scope of the work created a faulty or difficult structure for the novel as a whole. Several expressed disappointment that the passage of so many years seemed to shorten the time given to the portrayals of some promising characters, especially toward the end of the book. Some inconsistencies were noted; for example, changes in the diction of a Native American character's speech within a single episode. The didactic nature of the theme was both applauded and faulted. A few reviewers thought it undercut the narrative perspective at times, imposing a good vs. evil dichotomy. Proulx’s descriptions were universally admired. Most readers found verisimilitude in these observations of the uncertainty and fragility of life, while a few spoke of an overwhelming echo of doom long foretold.

== Publication ==
Excerpts from the novel were published in The New Yorker in March 2016.

== In other media ==
=== Television ===
A dramatic television series, based on the novel premiered on May 25, 2020 on National Geographic.
