= Annie Proulx =

American novelist, short story and non-fiction author (born 1935)

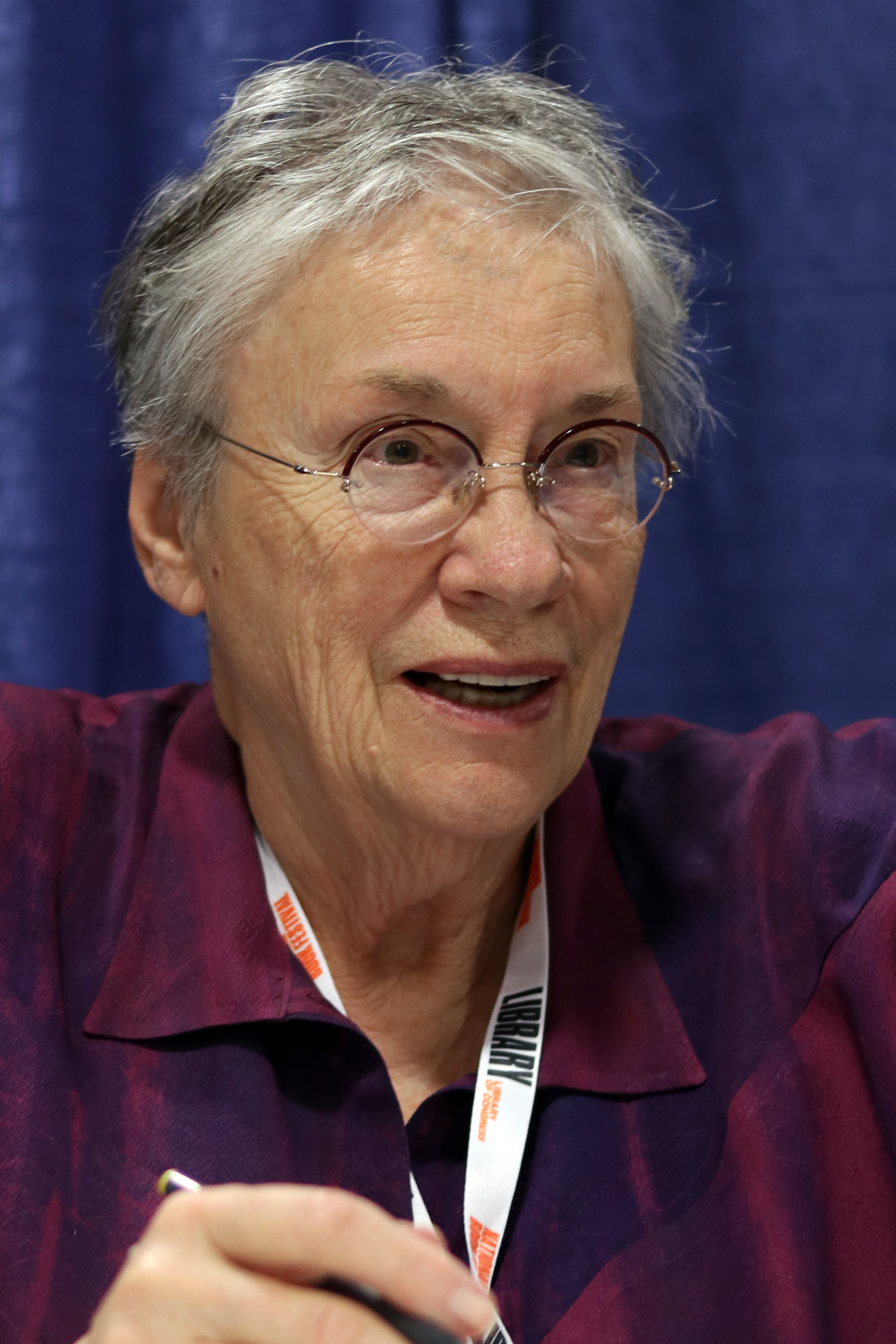
- Proulx at the 2018 U.S. National Book Festival
- Born: Edna Ann Proulx; August 22, 1935 (age 91); Norwich, Connecticut, U.S.
- Education: Colby College (attended); University of Vermont (BA); Sir George Williams University (MA); Concordia University (attended)
- Occupation: Novelist
- Children: 4
- Writing career
- Pen name: E. Annie Proulx, E. A. Proulx
- Notable awards: Pulitzer Prize for Fiction (1994)

Edna Ann Proulx (/pruː/ PROO; born August 22, 1935) is an American novelist, short story writer, and journalist. She has written most frequently as Annie Proulx but has also used the names E. Annie Proulx and E. A. Proulx.

She won the PEN/Faulkner Award for Fiction for her first novel, Postcards (1992), making her the first woman to receive the prize. Her second novel, The Shipping News (1993), won both the Pulitzer Prize for Fiction and the U.S. National Book Award for Fiction and was adapted as a 2001 film of the same name. Her short story "Brokeback Mountain" was adapted as an Academy Award, BAFTA and Golden Globe Award-winning motion picture released in 2005.

== Personal life and education ==
Proulx was born Edna Ann Proulx in Norwich, Connecticut, to Lois Nellie (née Gill) and Georges-Napoléon Proulx. Her first name honored one of her mother's aunts. She is of English and French-Canadian ancestry. Her maternal forebears came to America in 1635, 15 years after the Mayflower arrived.

Proulx lived in multiple states along the East Coast during her childhood as her father worked his way up through the textile industry. She wrote her first story at the age of 10, while sick with chicken pox. She graduated from Deering High School in Portland, Maine. She briefly attended Colby College, where she met her first husband, H. Ridgely Bullock Jr., and dropped out to marry him in 1955. She later returned to college, studying at the University of Vermont from 1966 to 1969, and graduated cum laude and Phi Beta Kappa with a B.A. in History in 1969. She earned her M.A. in history from Sir George Williams University (now Concordia University) in Montreal, Quebec in 1973. Proulx pursued a PhD at Concordia and passed her oral examinations in 1975, but abandoned her dissertation before completing the degree. In 1999, Concordia awarded her an honorary doctorate.

Proulx lived for more than 30 years in Vermont, has been married and divorced three times, and has three sons and a daughter (Jonathan, Gillis, Morgan, and Sylvia). In 1994, she moved to Bird Cloud, a ranch in Saratoga, Wyoming, spending part of the year in northern Newfoundland on a small cove adjacent to L'Anse aux Meadows. As of 2019, Proulx lived in Port Townsend, Washington.

== Writing career and recognition ==
Starting as a journalist, her first published work of fiction was "The Customs Lounge", a science fiction story published in the September 1963 issue of If, under the byline "E. A. Proulx".

A year later, her science fiction story "All the Pretty Little Horses" appeared in the teen magazine Seventeen in June 1964. She subsequently published stories in Esquire magazine and Gray's Sporting Journal in the late 1970s, as well as how-to manuals for cooking and gardening. Proulx published her first short-story collection, Heart Songs, in 1988 and her first novel, Postcards, in 1992. She was the first woman to receive the PEN/Faulkner Award, which was awarded to Postcards. She was awarded a NEA fellowship and a Guggenheim fellowship in 1992. Her 1993 novel The Shipping News was adapted into a 2001 film. Set in Newfoundland yet written by someone "from away" (not from Newfoundland), the novel stresses the vicarious quality of Proulx's writing.

She had the following comment on her celebrity status:

It's not good for one's view of human nature, that's for sure. You begin to see, when invitations are coming from festivals and colleges to come read (for an hour for a hefty sum of money), that the institutions are head-hunting for trophy writers. Most don't particularly care about your writing or what you're trying to say. You're there as a human object, one that has won a prize. It gives you a very odd, meat-rack kind of sensation.

In 1997, Proulx was awarded the Dos Passos Prize, a mid-career award for American writers. Proulx has twice won the O. Henry Prize for the year's best short story. In 1998, she won for "Brokeback Mountain", which had appeared in The New Yorker on October 13, 1997. Proulx won again the following year for "The Mud Below", which appeared in The New Yorker June 22 and 29, 1999. Both appear in her 1999 collection of short stories, Close Range: Wyoming Stories. The lead story in this collection, entitled "The Half-Skinned Steer", was selected by author Garrison Keillor for inclusion in The Best American Short Stories 1998, (Proulx herself edited the 1997 edition of this series) and later by novelist John Updike for inclusion in The Best American Short Stories of the Century (1999).

In 2007, the composer Charles Wuorinen approached Proulx with the idea of turning her short story "Brokeback Mountain" into an opera. The opera of the same name, with a libretto by Proulx herself, premiered January 28, 2014, at the Teatro Real in Madrid. It was praised as an often brilliant adaptation that clearly conveyed the text of the libretto with music that is rich in imagination and variety. In 2011 Proulx published, Bird Cloud: A Memoir, largely based on her former Wyoming ranch of the same name. In 2017, she received the F. Scott Fitzgerald Award for that year for Achievement in American Literature.

== Bibliography ==
=== Nonfiction ===
- Great grapes : grow the best ever. Pownal, Vermont: Storey Communications. 1980. ISBN 9780882662282.
- Proulx, Annie; Nichols, Lew (1980). Sweet & hard cider : making it, using it, & enjoying it. Charlotte, Vermont: Garden Way Publishing.
- Making the Best Apple Cider. Storey Communications. 1983. ISBN 9780882662220.
- Plan and Make Your Own Fences & Gates, Walkways, Walls & Drives (1983), ISBN 0-87857-452-2
- The Fine Art of Salad Gardening. 1985. ISBN 0-87857-528-6
- The Gourmet Gardener: Growing Choice Fruits and Vegetables with Spectacular Results (1987), ISBN 0-449-90227-7
- Cider: Making, Using & Enjoying Sweet and Hard Cider. Storey Communications. 2003. ISBN 9781580175203.
- Bird Cloud: A Memoir (2011), ISBN 978-0-7432-8880-4
- Foreword (2018) In: Wild Migrations: Atlas of Wyoming's Ungulates. Alethea Y. Steingisser, Emilene Ostlind, Hall Sawyer, James E. Meacham, Matthew J. Kauffman, and William J. Rudd (Eds.).ISBN 978-0870719431
- Fen, Bog & Swamp: A Short History of Peatland Destruction and Its Role in the Climate Crisis (2022)

==== Essay ====
- Swamps Can Protect Against Climate Change, If We Only Let Them. In: The New Yorker, June 27, 2022.

=== Novels ===
- Postcards (1992), ISBN 0-684-83368-9
- The Shipping News (1993), ISBN 0-684-85791-X
- Accordion Crimes (1996), ISBN 0-684-19548-8
- That Old Ace in the Hole (2002), ISBN 0-684-81307-6
- Barkskins (2016), ISBN 978-0-7432-8878-1

=== Short fiction ===
==== Collections ====
- Heart Songs and Other Stories (1988), ISBN 0-684-18717-5; republished with altered but similar content as trade paperback Heart Songs (1994) ISBN 1-86373-777-4
- Close Range: Wyoming Stories (1999), ISBN 0-684-85222-5
- Bad Dirt: Wyoming Stories 2 (2004), ISBN 0-7432-5799-5
- Fine Just the Way It Is: Wyoming Stories 3 (2008), ISBN 978-1-4165-7166-7

==== Stories ====
Title	Year	First published	Reprinted/collected	Notes
Rough Deeds	2013	Proulx, Annie (June 10–17, 2013). "Rough deeds". The New Yorker. Vol. 89, no. 17. pp. 56–61.		
A Resolute Man	2016	Proulx, Annie (March 21, 2016). "A resolute man". The New Yorker. Vol. 92, no. 6. pp. 76–85.		
The Corn Woman, Her Husband, and Their Child	2025	Proulx, Annie (August 18, 2025"). "The Corn Woman, Her Husband, and Their Child". The New Yorker. Vol. 101, no. 24. pp. 44-56.		

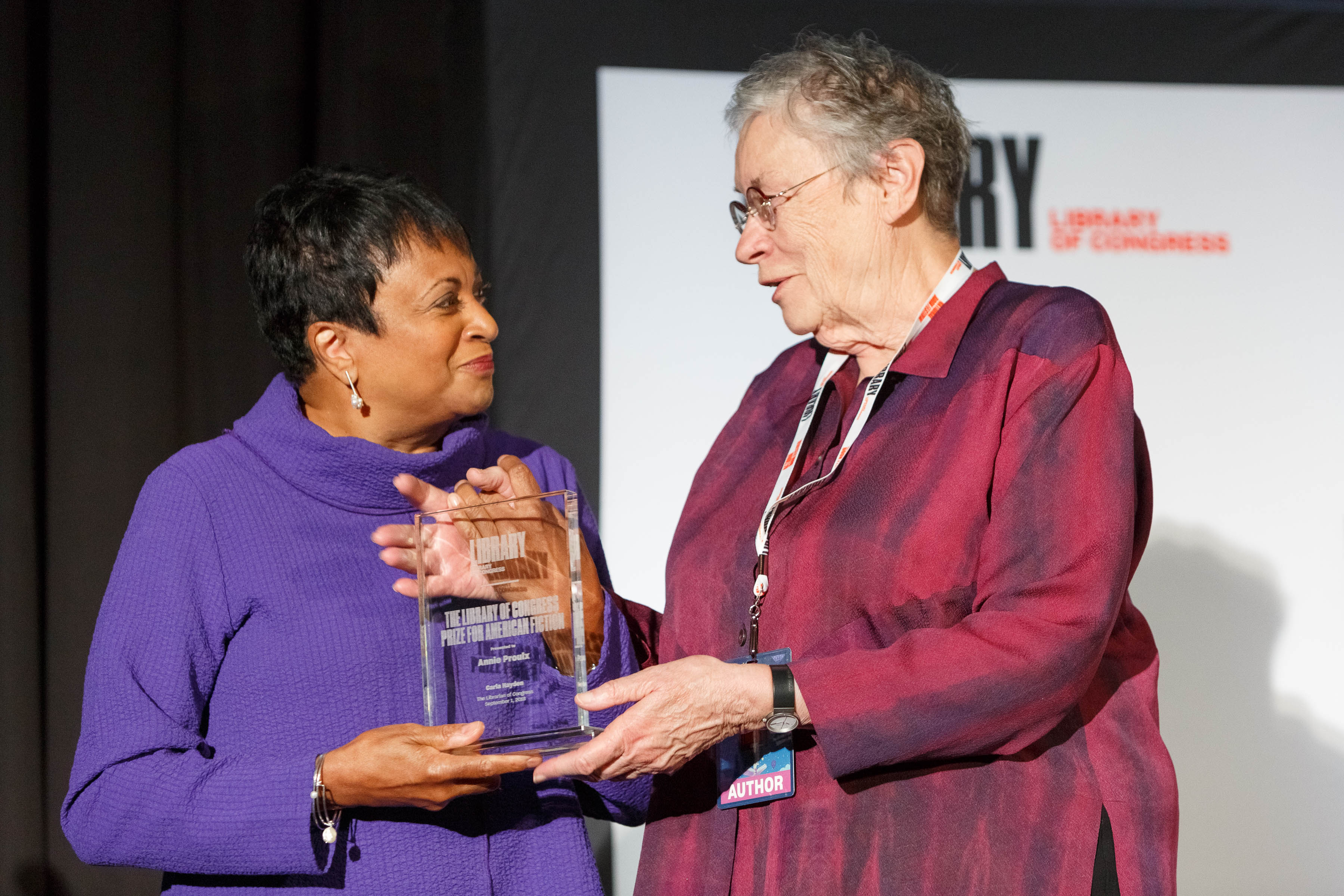
Annie Proulx receives the Prize for American Fiction from Carla Hayden at the 2018 National Book Festival.

== Awards and recognition ==
- 1993—PEN/Faulkner Award for Fiction (Postcards)
- 1993—Chicago Tribune Heartland Prize for Fiction, for The Shipping News
- 1993—Irish Times International Fiction Prize, for The Shipping News
- 1993—National Book Award, Fiction The Shipping News
- 1994—Pulitzer Prize, Fiction The Shipping News
- 1997—Shortlisted for the 1997 Orange Prize (Accordion Crimes)
- 1997—John Dos Passos Prize for Literature (for body of work)
- 1998—"Half-Skinned Steer", The Best American Short Stories 1998
- 1998—"Brokeback Mountain", O. Henry Awards O. Henry Awards: Prize Stories 1998
- 1998—"Brokeback Mountain", National Magazine Award
- 1999—"The Mud Below," O. Henry Awards: Prize Stories 1999
- 1999—"The Bunchgrass Edge of the World," The Best American Short Stories 1999
- 1999—"Half-Skinned Steer", The Best American Short Stories of the Century, edited by John Updike
- 2000—The New Yorker Book Award, Best Fiction 1999 (Close Range: Wyoming Stories)
- 2000—English-Speaking Union's Ambassador Book Award (Close Range: Wyoming Stories)
- 2000—"People in Hell Just Want a Drink of Water," The Best American Short Stories 2000
- 2000—Borders Original Voices Award in Fiction (Close Range, Wyoming Stories)
- 2000—WILLA Literary Award, Women Writing the West
- 2002—Best Foreign Language Novels of 2002 / Best American Novel Award, Chinese Publishing Association and Peoples' Literature Publishing House (That Old Ace in the Hole)
- 2004—Aga Khan Prize for Fiction for "The Wamsutter Wolf"
- 2012—United States Artists Fellow award
- 2017—National Book Foundation Medal for Distinguished Contribution to American Letters (lifetime achievement)
- 2018—Library of Congress Prize for American Fiction

== Adaptations ==
- The Shipping News (2001) was directed by Lasse Hallström and featured Kevin Spacey as the protagonist Quoyle, Judi Dench as Agnis Hamm and Julianne Moore as Wavey Prowse.
- Brokeback Mountain (2005), directed by Ang Lee and starring Heath Ledger and Jake Gyllenhaal, was based on a story of the same name in Proulx's collection of short stories, Close Range.
- Barkskins, a National Geographic television series based on Proulx's 2016 novel, premiered on May 25, 2020.
