= List of accolades received by Charlize Theron =

Charlize Theron awards and nominations
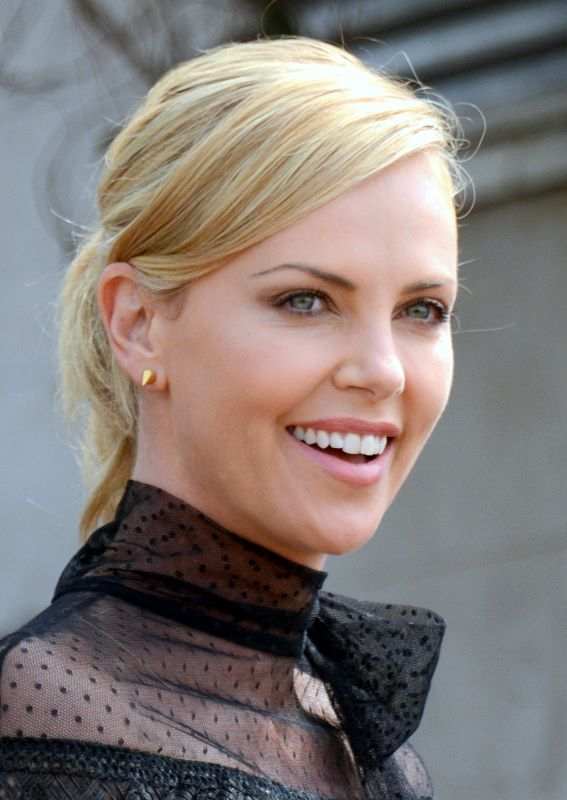
- Theron at the 2015 Cannes Film Festival
Awards and nominations
Award	Wins	Nominations
Academy Awards	1	3
BAFTAs	0	3
Primetime Emmy Awards	0	1
Golden Globe Awards	1	6
Screen Actors Guild Awards	1	6

Totals (Note: Certain award groups do not simply award one winner. They acknowledge several different recipients, have runners-up, and have third place. Since this is a specific recognition and is different from losing an award, runner-up mentions are considered wins in this award tally. For simplification and to avoid errors, each award in this list has been presumed to have had a prior nomination.)
- Wins: 25
- Nominations: 72

Charlize Theron is a South African and American actress and producer who has received various awards and nominations, including one Academy Award and one Golden Globe Award. Additionally, she has been nominated for two Academy Awards, three British Academy Film Awards, and one Primetime Emmy Award. In 2005, Theron received a star on the Hollywood Walk of Fame for her contributions to the motion picture industry.

In 1999, Theron starred in Lasse Hallström's drama The Cider House Rules. For her performance, she won the Bambi Award for Shooting Star: Female, and was nominated for the Satellite Award for Best Supporting Actress – Motion Picture. Theron's breakthrough role in the critically acclaimed biographical crime drama Monster (2003) won her the Academy Award for Best Actress, the Critics' Choice Movie Award for Best Actress, the Screen Actors Guild Award for Outstanding Performance by a Female Actor in a Leading Role, the Golden Globe Award for Best Actress in a Motion Picture – Drama, and she was nominated for the BAFTA Award for Best Actress in a Leading Role. In 2005, Theron starred in Niki Caro's drama North Country as a single mother and iron worker experiencing sexual harassment. Her performance went on to win the Desert Palm Achievement Award, the Hollywood Actress Award, and she was nominated for the Academy Award for Best Actress, the BAFTA Award for Best Actress in a Leading Role, and the Golden Globe Award for Best Actress in a Motion Picture – Drama.

In 2015, Theron starred in Mad Max: Fury Road as Imperator Furiosa opposite Tom Hardy. Theron received widespread acclaim for her performance, and winning the Critics' Choice Movie Award for Best Actress in an Action Movie, the MTV Movie Award for Best Female Performance, the Saturn Award for Best Actress, and was nominated for the AACTA International Award for Best Actress, the AACTA Award for Best Actress in a Leading Role, and the Washington D.C. Area Film Critics Association Award for Best Actress. In 2019, Theron starred in Jay Roach's drama Bombshell, based upon the accounts of the women at Fox News who set out to expose CEO Roger Ailes for sexual harassment. Theron's performance in the film garnered critical acclaim and earned her nominations for the Academy Award for Best Actress, the BAFTA Award for Best Actress in a Leading Role, and the Golden Globe Award for Best Actress in a Motion Picture – Drama.

== Accolades ==
Awards and nominations received by Charlize Theron
Organizations	Year (Note: Year in which award ceremony was held)	Work	Category	Result	Ref.
Academy Awards	2004	Monster	Best Actress	Won	
Academy Awards	2006	North Country	Best Actress	Nominated	
Academy Awards	2020	Bombshell	Best Actress	Nominated	
Audie Awards	2010	Nelson Mandela's Favorite African Folktales	Audiobook of the Year	Won	
Audie Awards	2010	Nelson Mandela's Favorite African Folktales	Multi-Voiced Performance	Won	
AACTA Awards	2016	Mad Max: Fury Road	Best International Actress	Nominated	
AACTA Awards	2016	Mad Max: Fury Road	Best Lead Actress	Nominated	
AACTA Awards	2020	Bombshell	Best International Actress	Nominated	
BAFTA Awards	2005	Monster	Best Actress in a Leading Role	Nominated	
BAFTA Awards	2006	North Country	Best Actress in a Leading Role	Nominated	
BAFTA Awards	2020	Bombshell	Best Actress in a Leading Role	Nominated	
Berlin International Film Festival	2004	Monster	Silver Bear for Best Actress (Note: Tied with Catalina Sandino Moreno for Maria Full of Grace)	Won	
Bambi Award	2000	The Cider House Rules	Shooting Star: Female	Won	
Chicago Film Critics Association Awards	2003	Monster	Best Actress	Won	
Chicago Film Critics Association Awards	2014	Mad Max: Fury Road	Best Actress	Nominated	
Critics' Choice Awards	2004	Monster	Best Movie Actress	Won	
Critics' Choice Awards	2006	North Country	Best Movie Actress	Nominated	
Critics' Choice Awards	2012	Young Adult	Best Movie Actress	Nominated	
Critics' Choice Awards	2016	Mad Max: Fury Road	Best Action Movie Actress	Won	
Critics' Choice Awards	2016	Mad Max: Fury Road	Best Movie Actress	Nominated	
Critics' Choice Awards	2019	Tully	Best Comedy Movie Actress	Nominated	
Critics' Choice Awards	2020	Bombshell	Best Movie Actress	Nominated	
Critics' Choice Awards	2020	Bombshell	Best Movie Cast	Nominated	
Critics' Choice Super Awards	2026	Apex	Best Actress in an Action Movie	Won	
Dallas–Fort Worth Film Critics Association	2003	Monster	Best Actress	Won	
Dallas–Fort Worth Film Critics Association	2005	North Country	Best Actress	Nominated	
Dallas–Fort Worth Film Critics Association	2011	Young Adult	Best Actress	Nominated	
Dallas–Fort Worth Film Critics Association	2015	Mad Max: Fury Road	Best Actress	Nominated	
Dallas–Fort Worth Film Critics Association	2019	Bombshell	Best Actress	Nominated	
Detroit Film Critics Society Awards	2011	Young Adult	Best Actress	Nominated	
Detroit Film Critics Society Awards	2019	Bombshell	Best Actress	Nominated	
Emmy Awards (News & Documentary)	2025	Into the Fire: The Lost Daughter	Outstanding Crime and Justice Documentary (Note: As a producer.)	Nominated	
Emmy Awards (Primetime)	2005	The Life and Death of Peter Sellers	Outstanding Supporting Actress in a Miniseries or a Movie	Nominated	
Florida Film Critics Circle Award	2019	Bombshell	Best Actress	Nominated	
Film Independent Spirit Awards	2004	Monster	Best Female Lead	Won	
Film Independent Spirit Awards	2004	Monster	Best First Feature Film Production	Won	
Golden Globe Awards	2004	Monster	Best Actress in a Motion Picture – Drama	Won	
Golden Globe Awards	2005	The Life and Death of Peter Sellers	Best Supporting Actress – Series, Miniseries, or Motion Picture Made for Television	Nominated	
Golden Globe Awards	2006	North Country	Best Actress in a Motion Picture – Drama	Nominated	
Golden Globe Awards	2012	Young Adult	Best Actress in a Motion Picture – Musical or Comedy	Nominated	
Golden Globe Awards	2019	Tully	Best Actress in a Motion Picture – Musical or Comedy	Nominated	
Golden Globe Awards	2020	Bombshell	Best Actress in a Motion Picture – Drama	Nominated	
Georgia Film Critics Association	2011	Young Adult	Best Actress	Nominated	
Golden Raspberry Awards	2002	Sweet November	Worst Actress	Nominated	
Golden Raspberry Awards	2015	A Million Ways to Die in the West	Worst Actress	Nominated	
Golden Raspberry Awards	2015	A Million Ways to Die in the West	Worst Screen Combo (with Seth MacFarlane)	Nominated	
Hollywood Critics Association Award	2019	Bombshell	Best Actress	Nominated	
Houston Film Critics Society Award	2019	Bombshell	Best Actress	Nominated	
Hollywood Film Award	2005	North Country	Best Actress of the Year	Won	
Irish Film & Television Drama Academy	2004	Monster	Best Film International Actress	Nominated	
London Film Critics' Circle Awards	2004	Monster	Actress of the Year	Nominated	
London Film Critics' Circle Awards	2019	Bombshell	Actress of the Year	Nominated	
Los Angeles Film Critics Association	2003	Monster	Best Actress	2nd place	
MTV Movie & TV Awards	2004	Monster	Best Kiss of the Year in a Movie (Note: Shared with Christina Ricci.)	Nominated	
MTV Movie & TV Awards	2004	Monster	Best Performance of the Year in a Movie	Nominated	
MTV Movie & TV Awards	2016	Mad Max: Fury Road	Best Fight of the Year in a Movie (Note: Shared with Tom Hardy.)	Nominated	
MTV Movie & TV Awards	2016	Mad Max: Fury Road	Best Hero of the Year in a Movie	Nominated	
MTV Movie & TV Awards	2016	Mad Max: Fury Road	Best Performance of the Year in a Movie	Won	
MTV Movie & TV Awards	2018	Atomic Blonde	Best Fight of the Year in a Movie (Note: Shared with Daniel Hargrave and Greg Rementer.)	Nominated	
National Board of Review	2003	Monster	Best Breakthrough Performance	Won	
National Society of Film Critics	2003	Monster	Best Actress	Won	
New York Film Critics Circle Award	2003	Monster	Best Actress	3rd place	
New York Film Critics Online	2003	Monster	Best Actress	Won	
Nickelodeon Kids' Choice Awards	2017	The Huntsman: Winter's War	Favorite Villain	Nominated	
Nickelodeon Kids' Choice Awards	2017	The Huntsman: Winter's War	Favorite Frenemies (shared with Emily Blunt)	Nominated	
Nickelodeon Kids' Choice Awards	2022	The Addams Family 2	Favorite Voice from an Animated Movie	Nominated	
Online Film Critics Society	2003	Monster	Best Actress	Nominated	
Online Film Critics Society	2015	Mad Max: Fury Road	Best Actress	Nominated	
Palm Springs International Film Festival	2006	North Country	Desert Palm Achievement Award	Won	
Palm Springs International Film Festival	2012	Young Adult	Chairman's Vanguard Award	Won	
Palm Springs International Film Festival	2020	Bombshell	International Star Award	Won	
People's Choice Awards	2013	Prometheus	Favorite Dramatic Movie Actress	Nominated	
People's Choice Awards	2013	Snow White and the Huntsman	Favorite Dramatic Movie Actress	Nominated	
People's Choice Awards	2016	Mad Max: Fury Road	Favorite Action Movie Actress	Nominated	
Satellite Awards	2000	The Cider House Rules	Best Supporting Actress in a Film	Nominated	
Satellite Awards	2011	Young Adult	Best Actress in a Film	Nominated	
Satellite Awards	2020	Bombshell	Best Actress in a Film	Nominated	
Saturn Awards	2010	The Burning Plain	Best Film Lead Actress	Nominated	
Saturn Awards	2013	Snow White and the Huntsman	Best Film Supporting Actress	Nominated	
Saturn Awards	2015	Mad Max: Fury Road	Best Film Lead Actress	Won	
Spike Video Game Award	2005	Aeon Flux	Best Performance by a Female	Won	
San Francisco Film Critics Circle	2003	Monster	Best Actress	Won	
San Francisco Film Critics Circle	2019	Bombshell	Best Actress	Nominated	
Screen Actors Guild Awards	2000	The Cider House Rules	Outstanding Motion Picture Cast	Nominated	
Screen Actors Guild Awards	2004	Monster	Outstanding Motion Picture Actress	Won	
Screen Actors Guild Awards	2005	The Life and Death of Peter Sellers	Outstanding Miniseries or Motion Picture Made for Television Actress	Nominated	
Screen Actors Guild Awards	2006	North Country	Outstanding Motion Picture Actress	Nominated	
Screen Actors Guild Awards	2020	Bombshell	Outstanding Motion Picture Actress	Nominated	
Screen Actors Guild Awards	2020	Bombshell	Outstanding Motion Picture Cast	Nominated	
St. Louis Film Critics Association	2018	Tully	Best Actress	Nominated	
St. Louis Film Critics Association	2019	Bombshell	Best Actress	Nominated	
Teen Choice Awards	2012	Snow White and the Huntsman	Choice Movie: Hissy Fit	Won	
Teen Choice Awards	2012	Snow White and the Huntsman	Choice Movie: Villain	Nominated	
Teen Choice Awards	2012	Prometheus	Choice Movie: Summer Actress	Nominated	
Teen Choice Awards	2016	The Huntsman: Winter's War	Choice Movie: Sci-Fi/Fantasy Actress	Nominated	
Teen Choice Awards	2016	The Huntsman: Winter's War	Choice Movie: Villain	Nominated	
Teen Choice Awards	2017	The Fate of the Furious	Choice Movie: Villain	Nominated	
Vancouver Film Critics Circle	2003	Monster	Best Actress	Won	
Washington D.C. Area Film Critics Association Awards	2005	North Country	Best Actress	Nominated	
Washington D.C. Area Film Critics Association Awards	2015	Mad Max: Fury Road	Best Actress	Nominated	
Women Film Critics Circle	2017	Atomic Blonde	Courage in Acting	Nominated	

== Honors ==
List of honors received by Charlize Theron
Award	Year	Ref(s)
Hollywood Walk of Fame	2005	
Indie Impact Award	2012	
American Cinematheque Award	2019	
Hollywood Career Achievement Award	2019	
