= List of African Academy Award winners and nominees =

This is a list of African Academy Award winners and nominees, which includes both ethnic African people born and/or raised in Africa and non-ethnic Africans born and raised in Africa.

== Best Actor ==
Best Actor in a Leading Role
Year	Name	Country	Film	Role	Status	Milestone / Notes
1959	Laurence Harvey	(Lithuania) (South Africa)	Room at the Top	Joe Lampton	Nominated	First Lithuanian nominated for an Oscar. Born in Lithuania, but educated and raised in South Africa, where he joined the army.

== Best Actress ==
Best Actress in a Leading Role
Year	Name	Country	Film	Role	Status	Milestone / Notes
1971	Janet Suzman	(South Africa) (United Kingdom)	Nicholas and Alexandra	Alexandra Feodorovna	Nominated	
2003	Charlize Theron	(South Africa) (United States)	Monster	Aileen Wuornos	Won	First African to win in an acting category.
2005	Charlize Theron	(South Africa) (United States)	North Country	Josey Aimes	Nominated	
2016	Ruth Negga	(Ethiopia) (Republic of Ireland)	Loving	Mildred Loving	Nominated	
2019	Charlize Theron	(South Africa) (United States)	Bombshell	Megyn Kelly	Nominated	

== Best Supporting Actor ==
Best Actor in a Supporting Role
Year	Name	Country	Film	Role	Status	Milestone / Notes
1936	Basil Rathbone	(South Africa) (United Kingdom)	Romeo and Juliet	Tybalt	Nominated	Rathbone was a South African-born British actor.
1938	Basil Rathbone	(South Africa) (United Kingdom)	If I Were King	King Louis XI	Nominated	
1948	Cecil Kellaway	(South Africa) (United Kingdom)	The Luck of the Irish	Horace	Nominated	
1962	Omar Sharif	(Egypt)	Lawrence of Arabia	Sherif Ali	Nominated	First African to be nominated for an Academy Award in any category.
1967	Cecil Kellaway	(South Africa) (United Kingdom)	Guess Who's Coming to Dinner	Monsignor Mike Ryan	Nominated	
2003	Djimon Hounsou	(Benin) (United States)	In America	Mateo	Nominated	First Black African to be nominated for an acting award.
2006	Djimon Hounsou	(Benin) (United States)	Blood Diamond	Solomon Vandy	Nominated	
2013	Barkhad Abdi	(Somalia) (United States)	Captain Phillips	Abduwali Muse	Nominated	
2018	Richard E. Grant	(Eswatini) (United Kingdom)	Can You Ever Forgive Me?	Jack Hock	Nominated	Grant is from a white British family; he was born and raised in Swaziland.

== Best Supporting Actress ==
Best Actress in a Supporting Role
Year	Name	Country	Film	Role	Status	Milestone / Notes
2013	Lupita Nyong'o	(Kenya) (Mexico)	12 Years a Slave	Patsey	Won	First black African woman to be nominated and win in any category.
2025	Wunmi Mosaku	(Nigeria) (United Kingdom)	Sinners	Annie	Nominated	

== Best Cinematography ==
Best Cinematography
Year	Name	Country	Film	Status	Milestone / Notes
1966	Ted Moore	(South Africa) (United Kingdom)	A Man for All Seasons	Won	Moore is a South African-born British. Won for Best Color Cinematography.
1991	Stephen Goldblatt	(South Africa) (United Kingdom)	The Prince of Tides	Nominated	Goldblatt is a South African-born British.
1995	Stephen Goldblatt	(South Africa) (United Kingdom)	Batman Forever	Nominated	Goldblatt is a South African-born British.
2002	Dion Beebe	(South Africa) (Australia)	Chicago	Nominated	Beebe is a South African-born Australian.
2005	Dion Beebe	(South Africa) (Australia)	Memoirs of a Geisha	Won	Beebe is a South African-born Australian.

== Best Director ==
Best Director
Year	Name	Country	Film	Status	Milestone / Notes
1996	Scott Hicks	(Uganda) (Australia)	Shine	Nominated	Hicks is a Ugandan-born Australian.
1997	Atom Egoyan	(Egypt) (Canada)	The Sweet Hereafter	Nominated	Egoyan is an Egyptian-born Canadian filmmaker.

== Best Documentary Feature ==
Best Documentary Feature
Year	Name	Country	Film	Status	Milestone / Notes
1997	Michele Ohayon (director)	(Morocco)	Colors Straight Up	Nominated	
2012	Malik Bendjelloul	(Algeria)	Searching for Sugar Man	Won	
2013	Jehane Noujaim (director); Karim Amer (producer)	(Egypt) (United States)	The Square	Nominated	
2020	Pippa Ehrlich (director); James Reed (director); Craig Foster (producer)	(South Africa)	My Octopus Teacher	Won	
2023	Moses Bwayo; Christopher Sharp	(Uganda)	Bobi Wine: The People's President	Nominated	Shared with John Battsek
2023	Kaouther Ben Hania	(Tunisia)	Four Daughters	Nominated	Shared with Nadim Cheikhrouha

== Best Film Editing ==
Best Film Editing
Year	Name	Country	Film	Status	Milestone / Notes
1970	Thelma Schoonmaker	(Algeria) (United States)	Woodstock	Nominated	Schoonmaker is from a white American family; she was born in Algeria.
1980	Thelma Schoonmaker	(Algeria) (United States)	Raging Bull	Won	Schoonmaker is from a white American family; she was born in Algeria.
1990	Thelma Schoonmaker	(Algeria) (United States)	Goodfellas	Nominated	Schoonmaker is from a white American family; she was born in Algeria.
2002	Thelma Schoonmaker	(Algeria) (United States)	Gangs of New York	Nominated	Schoonmaker is from a white American family; she was born in Algeria.
2004	Thelma Schoonmaker	(Algeria) (United States)	The Aviator	Won	Schoonmaker is from a white American family; she was born in Algeria.
2006	Thelma Schoonmaker	(Algeria) (United States)	The Departed	Won	Schoonmaker is from a white American family; she was born in Algeria.
2011	Thelma Schoonmaker	(Algeria) (United States)	Hugo	Nominated	Schoonmaker is from a white American family; she was born in Algeria.
2015	Margaret Sixel	(South Africa) (Australia)	Mad Max: Fury Road	Won	Sixel is a South African-born Australian.
2019	Thelma Schoonmaker	(Algeria) (United States)	The Irishman	Nominated	
2023	Thelma Schoonmaker	(Algeria) (United States)	Killers of the Flower Moon	Nominated	

== Best International Feature Film ==
The Academy Award for Best International Feature Film is awarded to a country, not to an individual, and the submitting country is the officially designated nominee in this category.

Best International Feature Film
Year	Country	Film	Director	Status	Milestone / Notes
1969	(Algeria)	Z	Costa-Gavras	Won	First African film to win an Academy Award.
1976	(Ivory Coast)	Black and White in Color	Jean-Jacques Annaud	Won	
1983	(Algeria)	Le Bal	Ettore Scola	Nominated	
1995	(Algeria)	Dust of Life	Rachid Bouchareb	Nominated	
2004	(South Africa)	Yesterday	Darrell Roodt	Nominated	
2005	(South Africa)	Tsotsi	Gavin Hood	Won	First African film in a language other than French to win in this category.
2006	(Algeria)	Days of Glory	Rachid Bouchareb	Nominated	
2010	(Algeria)	Outside the Law	Rachid Bouchareb	Nominated	
2014	(Mauritania)	Timbuktu	Abderrahmane Sissako	Nominated	
2020	(Tunisia)	The Man Who Sold His Skin	Kaouther Ben Hania	Nominated	
2025	(Tunisia)	The Voice of Hind Rajab	Kaouther Ben Hania	Nominated	

== Best Live Action Short Film ==
Best Live Action Short Film
Year	Name	Country	Film	Status	Milestone / Notes
2019	Meryam Joobeur	(Tunisia) (Canada)	Brotherhood	Nominated	Joobeur is Tunisian-born Canadian. Shared with Maria Gracia Turgeon.
2023	Misan Harriman	(Nigeria) (United Kingdom)	The After	Nominated	Harriman is Nigerian-born British. Shared with Nicky Bentham.
2024	Cindy Lee (director)	(South Africa)	The Last Ranger	Nominated	Shared with Darwin Shaw

== Best Makeup and Hairstyling ==
Best Makeup and Hairstyling
Year	Name	Country	Film	Status	Milestone / Notes
1999	Trefor Proud	(Zimbabwe)	Topsy-Turvy	Won	Proud is the first Zimbabwean to win an Academy Award in this category. Shared with Christine Blundell.
2019	Tristan Versluis	(Zimbabwe) (United Kingdom)	1917	Nominated	Versluis is a Zimbabwean-born English. Shared with Naomi Donne and Rebecca Cole.

== Best Music, Original Score ==
Best Original Score
Year	Name	Country	Film	Status	Milestone / Notes
1985	Caiphus Semenya	(South Africa)	The Color Purple	Nominated	
1987	Jonas Gwangwa	(South Africa)	Cry Freedom	Nominated	

== Best Music, Original Song ==
Best Original Song
Year	Name	Country	Film	Song	Status	Milestone / Notes
1987	Jonas Gwangwa	(South Africa)	Cry Freedom	"Cry Freedom"	Nominated	Shared with George Fenton.
2012	Herbert Kretzmer	(South Africa) (United Kingdom)	Les Misérables	"Suddenly"	Nominated	Kretzmer is from a Jewish family. Shared with Alain Boublil and Claude-Michel Schönberg.
2022	Tems	(Nigeria)	Black Panther: Wakanda Forever	"Lift Me Up"	Nominated	Shared with Rihanna, Ludwig Göransson, and Ryan Coogler.

== Best Writing (Adapted Screenplay) ==
Best Adapted Screenplay
Year	Name	Country	Film	Adapted From	Status	Milestone / Notes
1983	Ronald Harwood	(South Africa) (United Kingdom)	The Dresser	The Dresser by Ronald Harwood	Nominated	
1987	Mark Peploe	(Kenya) (United Kingdom)	The Last Emperor	From Emperor to Citizen: The Autobiography of Aisin-Gioro Pu Yi by Henry Pu Yi	Won	Peploe is a Kenyan-born English writer. Shared with Bernardo Bertolucci.
1997	Atom Egoyan	(Egypt) (Canada)	The Sweet Hereafter	The Sweet Hereafter by Russell Banks	Nominated	
2002	Ronald Harwood	(South Africa) (United Kingdom)	The Pianist	The Pianist by Władysław Szpilman	Won	
2007	Ronald Harwood	(South Africa) (United Kingdom)	The Diving Bell and the Butterfly	The Diving Bell and the Butterfly by Jean-Dominique Bauby	Nominated	
2009	Neill Blomkamp	(South Africa)	District 9	Alive in Joburg by Neill Blomkamp	Nominated	Shared with Terri Tatchell.

== Best Writing (Original Screenplay) ==
Best Original Screenplay
Year	Name	Country	Film	Status	Milestone / Notes
1996	Scott Hicks	(Uganda) (Australia)	Shine	Nominated	Hicks is a Ugandan-born Australian. Shared with Jan Sardi.

== See also ==
- List of Asian Academy Award winners and nominees
- List of black Academy Award winners and nominees
- List of Puerto Rican Academy Award winners and nominees
