= List of black Academy Award winners and nominees =

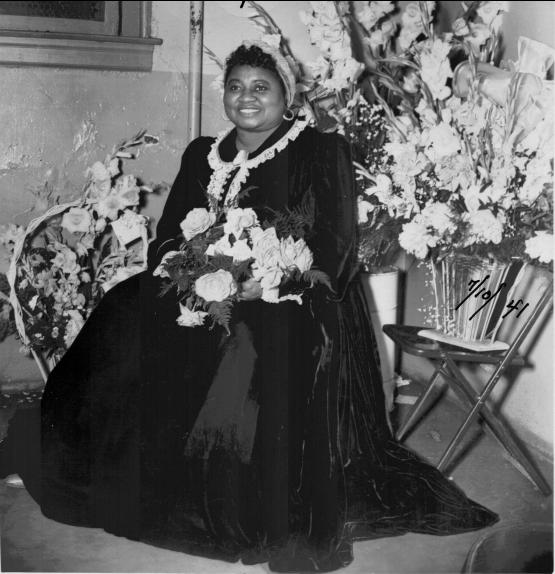
Hattie McDaniel was the first African American to win an Academy Award, in 1940

This list of Black Academy Award winners and nominees is updated as of the 98th Academy Awards, which was held on March 15, 2026.

== Best Actor in a Leading Role ==
Best Actor in a Leading Role
Year	Name	Country	Film	Role	Status	Milestone / Notes
1958	Sidney Poitier	(The Bahamas)	The Defiant Ones	Noah Cullen	Nominated	First Black actor to be nominated for Best Actor.
1963	Sidney Poitier	(The Bahamas)	Lilies of the Field	Homer Smith	Won	First Black man to win a competitive Oscar. First Bahamian to win Best Actor. First Black actor to receive two acting nominations (Best Actor). Youngest Black actor to win Best Actor (age 37).
1970	James Earl Jones	(United States)	The Great White Hope	Jack Jefferson	Nominated	
1972	Paul Winfield	(United States)	Sounder	Nathan Lee Morgan	Nominated	First film to feature African-American nominees for both Best Actor and Best Actress.
1986	Dexter Gordon	(United States)	Round Midnight	Dale Turner	Nominated	First jazz musician to be nominated for Best Actor.
1989	Morgan Freeman	(United States)	Driving Miss Daisy	Hoke Colburn	Nominated	
1992	Denzel Washington	(United States)	Malcolm X	Malcolm X	Nominated	
1993	Laurence Fishburne	(United States)	What's Love Got to Do with It	Ike Turner	Nominated	Second film to feature African-American nominees for both Best Actor and Best Actress.
1994	Morgan Freeman	(United States)	The Shawshank Redemption	Ellis Boyd 'Red' Redding	Nominated	
1999	Denzel Washington	(United States)	The Hurricane	Rubin Carter	Nominated	
2001	Denzel Washington	(United States)	Training Day	Alonzo Harris	Won	Second African-American actor to receive the award for Best Actor. First time two African-American performers won Oscars in the same year (Halle Berry, Monster's Ball). First African-American actor to win multiple competitive Academy Awards. First and only African-American actor to win Academy Awards in both acting categories (lead and supporting).
2001	Will Smith	(United States)	Ali	Muhammad Ali	Nominated	First time multiple African-American actors nominated for Best Actor in the same year.
2004	Jamie Foxx	(United States)	Ray	Ray Charles	Won	First African-American to receive two acting nominations in the same year.
2004	Don Cheadle	(United States)	Hotel Rwanda	Paul Rusesabagina	Nominated	
2005	Terrence Howard	(United States)	Hustle & Flow	DJay	Nominated	
2006	Forest Whitaker	(United States)	The Last King of Scotland	Idi Amin	Won	
2006	Will Smith	(United States)	The Pursuit of Happyness	Chris Gardner	Nominated	
2009	Morgan Freeman	(United States)	Invictus	Nelson Mandela	Nominated	
2012	Denzel Washington	(United States)	Flight	William "Whip" Whitaker	Nominated	
2013	Chiwetel Ejiofor	(United Kingdom)	12 Years a Slave	Solomon Northup	Nominated	First Black British actor to be nominated for Best Actor.
2016	Denzel Washington	(United States)	Fences	Troy Maxson	Nominated	First Black actor to direct himself to an Oscar nomination (for acting only). First Black actor to be nominated for both acting and producing (Best Picture) in the same year.
2017	Denzel Washington	(United States)	Roman J. Israel, Esq.	Roman J. Israel	Nominated	First Black actor to be nominated two years in a row (nominated the same years as first Black actress).
2017	Daniel Kaluuya	(United Kingdom)	Get Out	Chris Washington	Nominated	Second Black British actor to be nominated for Best Actor.
2020	Chadwick Boseman	(United States)	Ma Rainey's Black Bottom	Levee Green	Nominated	First African-American actor to receive a posthumous nomination. Third film to feature African-American nominees for both Best Actor and Best Actress.
2021	Will Smith	(United States)	King Richard	Richard Williams	Won	Second Black actor, and ninth overall, to be nominated for both acting and producing (Best Picture) in the same year.
2021	Denzel Washington	(United States)	The Tragedy of Macbeth	Lord Macbeth	Nominated	Denzel Washington has the most nominations for an African-American actor: Best Actor (7 nominations) and Best Supporting Actor (2 nominations). First African-American actor to receive a nomination for their performance in a Shakespeare adaptation.
2023	Jeffrey Wright	(United States)	American Fiction	Thelonious "Monk" Ellison	Nominated	First film to feature African-American nominees for both Best Actor and Best Supporting Actor.
2023	Colman Domingo	(United States)	Rustin	Bayard Rustin	Nominated	First gay Black and Afro-Latino actor to be nominated for Best Actor.
2024	Colman Domingo	(United States)	Sing Sing	John "Divine G" Whitfield	Nominated	Second African-American actor to be nominated two years in a row.
2025	Michael B. Jordan	(United States)	Sinners	Elijah "Smoke" Moore / Elias "Stack" Moore	Won	First black actor to be nominated for playing two characters in the same film. Second film to feature Black nominees for both Best Actor and Best Supporting Actor.

== Best Actress in a Leading Role ==
Best Actress in a Leading Role
Year	Name	Country	Film	Role	Status	Milestone / Notes
1954	Dorothy Dandridge	(United States)	Carmen Jones	Carmen Jones	Nominated	First African-American actress to be nominated for Best Actress.
1972	Diana Ross	(United States)	Lady Sings the Blues	Billie Holiday	Nominated	First African-American actress to receive an Academy Award nomination for a debut film performance. First time multiple African-American actresses received Best Actress nominations.
1972	Cicely Tyson	(United States)	Sounder	Rebecca Morgan	Nominated	First film to feature African-American nominees for both Best Actor and Best Actress. First time multiple African-American actresses received Best Actress nominations.
1974	Diahann Carroll	(United States)	Claudine	Claudine	Nominated	
1985	Whoopi Goldberg	(United States)	The Color Purple	Celie Johnson	Nominated	Debut film performance. First time multiple African-American actresses received nominations for the same film for both Best Actress and Best Supporting Actress.
1993	Angela Bassett	(United States)	What's Love Got to Do with It	Tina Turner	Nominated	Second film to feature African-American nominees for both Best Actor and Best Actress.
2001	Halle Berry	(United States)	Monster's Ball	Leticia Musgrove	Won	First African-American actress to win Best Actress. First person of color to win Best Actress. First time two African-American performers won Oscars in the same year (Denzel Washington, Training Day).
2009	Gabourey Sidibe	(United States)	Precious	Claireece "Precious" Jones	Nominated	Debut film performance. Second film to feature African-American nominees for both Best Actress and Best Supporting Actress.
2011	Viola Davis	(United States)	The Help	Aibileen Clark	Nominated	Second African-American actress to receive acting nominations in the lead and supporting categories after Whoopi Goldberg. Third film to feature African-American nominees for both Best Actress and Supporting Actress categories.
2012	Quvenzhané Wallis	(United States)	Beasts of the Southern Wild	Hushpuppy	Nominated	Debut film performance. At age 9, youngest ever Best Actress nominee. First person born in the 21st century to receive an Academy Award nomination.
2016	Ruth Negga	(Republic of Ireland) (Ethiopia)	Loving	Mildred Loving	Nominated	First Black Irish actress to be nominated. First Black African (Ethiopia) actress to be nominated for Lead Actress.
2019	Cynthia Erivo	(United Kingdom)	Harriet	Harriet Tubman	Nominated	First Black British actress to be nominated. Second Black woman to receive multiple Oscar nominations in the same year. Third person nominated for an acting award and a music award (Best Original Song) in the same year. First Nigerian to receive an Academy Award nomination.
2020	Viola Davis	(United States)	Ma Rainey's Black Bottom	Ma Rainey	Nominated	Most nominated African-American actress, with four nominations. First Black actress to receive two nominations for Best Actress. Third film to feature African-American nominees for both Best Actor and Best Actress. Second time multiple African-American actresses received Best Actress nominations.
2020	Andra Day	(United States)	The United States vs. Billie Holiday	Billie Holiday	Nominated	Second time multiple African-American actresses received Best Actress nominations. First time that an African-American role has been nominated for a second performer playing it in a different film.
2024	Cynthia Erivo	(United Kingdom)	Wicked	Elphaba Thropp	Nominated	First Black British actress to receive two nominations for Best Actress, and the second Black actress to receive two nominations for Best Actress. Fifth Black actress to receive two acting nominations.

== Best Actor in a Supporting Role ==
Best Actor in a Supporting Role
Year	Name	Country	Film	Role	Status	Milestone / Notes
1969	Rupert Crosse	(United States)	The Reivers	Ned	Nominated	First African-American actor to be nominated for Best Supporting Actor.
1981	Howard Rollins	(United States)	Ragtime	Coalhouse Walker Jr.	Nominated	Debut film performance.
1982	Louis Gossett Jr.	(United States)	An Officer and a Gentleman	Gunnery Sergeant Emil Foley	Won	First African-American actor to win Best Supporting Actor.
1984	Adolph Caesar	(United States)	A Soldier's Story	Sgt. Waters	Nominated	
1987	Morgan Freeman	(United States)	Street Smart	Fast Black	Nominated	First time multiple African-American actors received Best Supporting Actor nominations.
1987	Denzel Washington	(United States)	Cry Freedom	Steve Biko	Nominated	First time multiple African-American actors received Best Supporting Actor nominations.
1989	Denzel Washington	(United States)	Glory	Pvt. Trip	Won	First African-American actor to receive two Best Supporting Actor nominations.
1992	Jaye Davidson	(United Kingdom)	The Crying Game	Dil	Nominated	Debut film performance. Youngest Black actor to receive an Academy Award nomination (age 24); First Black British actor to receive an Academy Award nomination. First out Black actor to receive an Academy Award nomination.
1994	Samuel L. Jackson	(United States)	Pulp Fiction	Jules Winnfield	Nominated	
1996	Cuba Gooding Jr.	(United States)	Jerry Maguire	Rod Tidwell	Won	Youngest African-American male actor to win an Academy Award (age 29).
1999	Michael Clarke Duncan	(United States)	The Green Mile	John Coffey	Nominated	
2003	Djimon Hounsou	(Benin)	In America	Mateo	Nominated	First Black actor born in Africa (specifically in Benin) to receive an Academy Award nomination.
2004	Morgan Freeman	(United States)	Million Dollar Baby	Eddie 'Scrap-Iron' Dupris	Won	Oldest African-American actor to win an Academy Award (age 67).
2004	Jamie Foxx	(United States)	Collateral	Max	Nominated	First African-American to receive two acting nominations in the same year.
2006	Djimon Hounsou	(Benin)	Blood Diamond	Solomon Vandy	Nominated	
2006	Eddie Murphy	(United States)	Dreamgirls	James 'Thunder' Early	Nominated	First film to feature African-American nominees for both Best Supporting Actor and Best Supporting Actress.
2013	Barkhad Abdi	(Somalia)	Captain Phillips	Abduwali Muse	Nominated	Debut film performance. Second Black actor born in Africa (specifically in Somalia) to receive an Academy Award nomination.
2016	Mahershala Ali	(United States)	Moonlight	Juan	Won	Second film to feature Black nominees for both Best Supporting Actor and Best Supporting Actress. First Muslim actor to win an Oscar. First time two African-American performers won in supporting role Oscars in the same year (Viola Davis, Fences).
2018	Mahershala Ali	(United States)	Green Book	Don Shirley	Won	Second time two African-American performers won supporting role Oscars in the same year (Regina King, If Beale Street Could Talk). First African-American actor to win two Oscars in the same category. Second African-American actor to win multiple competitive Academy Awards.
2020	Daniel Kaluuya	(United Kingdom)	Judas and the Black Messiah	Fred Hampton	Won	First Black British actor to win an acting Oscar. First Black British actor to receive multiple Academy Award nominations. First film to have multiple black actors nominated in the same category for the same film.
2020	Lakeith Stanfield	(United States)	Judas and the Black Messiah	William O'Neal	Nominated	First film to have multiple black actors nominated in the same category for the same film.
2020	Leslie Odom Jr.	(United States)	One Night in Miami...	Sam Cooke	Nominated	First man to receive Academy Award nominations in the same year for acting and songwriting. Fourth person overall, third Black person, and first Black man nominated for an Academy Award for acting and songwriting in the same year.
2022	Brian Tyree Henry	(United States)	Causeway	James Aucoin	Nominated	
2023	Sterling K. Brown	(United States)	American Fiction	Clifford "Cliff" Ellison	Nominated	First film to feature African-American nominees for both Best Actor and Best Supporting Actor.
2025	Delroy Lindo	(United Kingdom) (United States)	Sinners	Delta Slim	Nominated	Naturalized American citizen Oldest Black acting nominee. Second film to feature Black nominees for both Best Actor and Best Supporting Actor. Third film to feature Black nominees for both Best Supporting Actor and Best Supporting Actress.

== Best Actress in a Supporting Role ==
Best Actress in a Supporting Role
Year	Name	Country	Film	Role	Status	Milestone / Notes
1939	Hattie McDaniel	(United States)	Gone with the Wind	Mammy	Won	First African-American to be nominated for and to win an Academy Award in any category.
1949	Ethel Waters	(United States)	Pinky	Mrs. Dicey Johnson (Pinky's Granny)	Nominated	Second African-American to be nominated for an Academy Award.
1959	Juanita Moore	(United States)	Imitation of Life	Annie Johnson	Nominated	
1967	Beah Richards	(United States)	Guess Who's Coming to Dinner	Mrs. Prentice	Nominated	
1983	Alfre Woodard	(United States)	Cross Creek	Geechee	Nominated	
1985	Margaret Avery	(United States)	The Color Purple	Shug Avery	Nominated	First time multiple African-American actresses from the same film are nominated in the same category. First time two Black performers were nominated for Supporting Actress in the same year. First film to feature African-American nominees for both Best Actress and Best Supporting Actress. Winfrey's debut film performance.
1985	Oprah Winfrey	(United States)	The Color Purple	Sofia	Nominated	First time multiple African-American actresses from the same film are nominated in the same category. First time two Black performers were nominated for Supporting Actress in the same year. First film to feature African-American nominees for both Best Actress and Best Supporting Actress. Winfrey's debut film performance.
1990	Whoopi Goldberg	(United States)	Ghost	Oda Mae Brown	Won	First African-American actress to receive two acting nominations. First African-American actress to receive acting nominations in the lead and supporting categories. Second African-American actress to win Best Supporting Actress.
1996	Marianne Jean-Baptiste	(United Kingdom)	Secrets & Lies	Hortense Cumberbatch	Nominated	First Black British actress to receive an Academy Award nomination.
2002	Queen Latifah	(United States)	Chicago	Matron Mama Morton	Nominated	First female hip hop artist to be nominated for an Academy Award.
2004	Sophie Okonedo	(United Kingdom)	Hotel Rwanda	Tatiana Rusesabagina	Nominated	Second Black British actress to receive an Academy Award nomination.
2006	Jennifer Hudson	(United States)	Dreamgirls	Effie White	Won	Debut film performance. Youngest African-American to win an Academy Award (age 25). First film to feature African-American nominees for both Best Supporting Actor and Best Supporting Actress.
2007	Ruby Dee	(United States)	American Gangster	Mama Lucas	Nominated	At age 83, oldest African-American actress to be nominated for an Academy Award.
2008	Viola Davis	(United States)	Doubt	Mrs. Miller	Nominated	First time two Black performers from different films were nominated for Supporting Actress in the same year.
2008	Taraji P. Henson	(United States)	The Curious Case of Benjamin Button	Queenie	Nominated	First time two Black performers from different films were nominated for Supporting Actress in the same year.
2009	Mo'Nique	(United States)	Precious	Mary Lee Johnston	Won	Second film to feature African-American nominees for both Best Actress and Best Supporting Actress.
2011	Octavia Spencer	(United States)	The Help	Minny Jackson	Won	Third film to feature African-American nominees for both Best Actress and Supporting Actress.
2013	Lupita Nyong'o	(Kenya) (Mexico)	12 Years a Slave	Patsey	Won	Debut film performance. First Black African (Kenyan) actress to be nominated. First Black African to win in any category. First Black Mexican to be nominated and win in any category. First Afro-Latina actress to be nominated and win an Academy Award.
2016	Viola Davis	(United States)	Fences	Rose Maxson	Won	First time two African-American performers won in supporting role Oscars in the same year (Mahershala Ali, Moonlight). First time three films have Black performers nominated for Supporting Actress in the same year; thus, first time there was a black majority in any acting category.
2016	Naomie Harris	(United Kingdom)	Moonlight	Paula	Nominated	Third Black British actress to receive an Academy Award nomination. Second film to feature Black nominees for both Best Supporting Actor and Best Supporting Actress.
2016	Octavia Spencer	(United States)	Hidden Figures	Dorothy Vaughan	Nominated	Third Black actress following Whoopi Goldberg and Viola Davis to earn multiple Oscar nominations. First Black actress to be nominated after previously winning.
2017	Octavia Spencer	(United States)	The Shape of Water	Zelda Fuller	Nominated	First Black actress to be nominated two years in a row (nominated the same years as first Black actor).
2017	Mary J. Blige	(United States)	Mudbound	Florence Jackson	Nominated	First Black woman to receive multiple Oscar nominations in the same year. First person nominated for an acting award and a music award (Best Original Song) in the same year.
2018	Regina King	(United States)	If Beale Street Could Talk	Sharon Rivers	Won	Second time two African-American performers won supporting Oscars in the same year (Mahershala Ali, Green Book).
2021	Ariana DeBose	(United States)	West Side Story	Anita	Won	First Black, African-American, Afro-Latina queer actress to be nominated and win in any acting category.
2021	Aunjanue Ellis	(United States)	King Richard	Oracene "Brandy" Price	Nominated	
2022	Angela Bassett	(United States)	Black Panther: Wakanda Forever	Queen Ramonda	Nominated	First actor nominated for a Marvel Cinematic Universe film. First actress nominated for a comic book film. Third African-American actress to receive acting nominations in the lead and supporting categories after Whoopi Goldberg and Viola Davis. Fourth Black actress to be nominated twice.
2023	Da'Vine Joy Randolph	(United States)	The Holdovers	Mary Lamb	Won	
2023	Danielle Brooks	(United States)	The Color Purple	Sofia	Nominated	Second time that an African-American role has been nominated for a second performer playing it in a different film - first time for a fictional role, first time for a supporting role.
2024	Zoe Saldaña	(United States)	Emilia Pérez	Rita Mora Castro	Won	Second Afro-Latina to win Best Supporting Actress.
2025	Wunmi Mosaku	(Nigeria) (United Kingdom)	Sinners	Annie	Nominated	Third film to feature Black nominees for both Best Supporting Actor and Best Supporting Actress. First Black Actress born in Africa (Nigeria) nominated in this category.
2025	Teyana Taylor	(United States)	One Battle After Another	Perfidia Beverly Hills	Nominated	

== Best Animated Feature ==
Academy Award for Best Animated Feature
Year	Name	Country	Film	Status	Milestone / Notes
2018	Peter Ramsey	(United States)	Spider-Man: Into the Spider-Verse	Won	Shared with Phil Lord, Christopher Miller, Bob Persichetti & Rodney Rothman; First African American to be nominated for and to win for Animated Feature.
2023	Kemp Powers	(United States)	Spider-Man: Across the Spider-Verse	Nominated	Shared with Joaquim Dos Santos, Justin K. Thompson, Phil Lord, Christopher Miller and Amy Pascal.

== Best Cinematography ==
Academy Award for Best Cinematography
Year	Name	Country	Film	Status	Milestone / Notes
1998	Remi Adefarasin	(United Kingdom)	Elizabeth	Nominated	First Black person to be nominated for Best Cinematography.
2016	Bradford Young	(United States)	Arrival	Nominated	First African American to be nominated in the category.
2025	Autumn Durald Arkapaw	(United States)	Sinners	Won	First Black woman to be nominated in the category. First woman to win the category.

== Best Costume Design ==
Academy Award for Best Costume Design
Year	Name	Country	Film	Status	Milestone / Notes
1992	Ruth E. Carter	(United States)	Malcolm X	Nominated	First African American to be nominated for Best Costume Design.
1997	Ruth E. Carter	(United States)	Amistad	Nominated	
2004	Sharen Davis	(United States)	Ray	Nominated	
2006	Sharen Davis	(United States)	Dreamgirls	Nominated	
2018	Ruth E. Carter	(United States)	Black Panther	Won	First African American to win for Best Costume Design.
2021	Paul Tazewell	(United States)	West Side Story	Nominated	First African American male costume designer to be nominated for Best Costume Design.
2022	Ruth E. Carter	(United States)	Black Panther: Wakanda Forever	Won	First African American woman to win any two competitive Academy Awards.
2024	Paul Tazewell	(United States)	Wicked	Won	First African American male costume designer to win for Best Costume Design.
2025	Ruth E. Carter	(United States)	Sinners	Nominated	First African American woman to be nominated five times in any category.

== Best Director ==
Academy Award for Best Director
Year	Name	Country	Film	Status	Milestone / Notes
1991	John Singleton	(United States)	Boyz n the Hood	Nominated	First African-American to be nominated for Best Director. Youngest person ever nominated in this category (age 24). First Black director nominated for their debut feature film.
2009	Lee Daniels	(United States)	Precious	Nominated	First nominated African-American director to direct a Best Picture-nominated film.
2013	Steve McQueen	(United Kingdom)	12 Years a Slave	Nominated	First Black director whose film won an Oscar for Best Picture. First Black British person to be nominated for Best Director.
2016	Barry Jenkins	(United States)	Moonlight	Nominated	Second Black director to direct a Best Picture-winning film. First African-American director to direct a Best Picture-winning film.
2017	Jordan Peele	(United States)	Get Out	Nominated	First African-American nominated for both Best Director and Best Picture for their debut film.
2018	Spike Lee	(United States)	BlacKkKlansman	Nominated	
2025	Ryan Coogler	(United States)	Sinners	Nominated	

== Best Documentary Feature ==
Academy Award for Best Documentary Feature
Year	Name	Country	Film	Status	Milestone / Notes
1987	Callie Crossley (director/producer)	(United States)	Eyes on the Prize: America's Civil Rights Years/Bridge to Freedom 1965	Nominated	First African American to be nominated for Best Documentary Feature. Shared with James A. DeVinney.
1990	Yvonne Smith (producer)	(United States)	Adam Clayton Powell	Nominated	Shared with Richard Kilberg.
1993	William Miles (director/producer)	(United States)	Liberators: Fighting on Two Fronts in World War II	Nominated	
1997	Spike Lee (director/producer); Samuel D. Pollard (producer)	(United States)	4 Little Girls	Nominated	
2004	Karolyn Ali (producer)	(United States)	Tupac: Resurrection	Nominated	
2012	T. J. Martin (director)	(United States)	Undefeated	Won	First African American to win in this category.
2016	Ava DuVernay (director/producer)	(United States)	13th	Nominated	
2016	Roger Ross Williams (director/producer)	(United States)	Life, Animated	Nominated	Shared with Julie Goldman.
2016	Raoul Peck (director/producer); Hébert Peck (producer)	(Haiti)	I Am Not Your Negro	Nominated	First Haitians to be nominated in this category.
2016	Ezra Edelman (director/producer)	(United States)	O.J.: Made in America	Won	
2017	Yance Ford (director/producer)	(United States)	Strong Island	Nominated	First openly transgender man to be nominated for any Academy Award. First openly transgender director to be nominated for any Academy Award. Shared with Joslyn Barnes.
2018	RaMell Ross (director/producer)	(United States)	Hale County This Morning, This Evening	Nominated	Shared with Joslyn Barnes and Su Kim.
2020	Garrett Bradley (director/producer); Lauren Domino (producer)	(United States)	Time	Nominated	Shared with Kellen Quinn.
2021	Ahmir "Questlove" Thompson (director)	(United States)	Summer of Soul (...Or, When the Revolution Could Not Be Televised)	Won	Shared with Joseph Patel, Robert Fyvolent, and David Dinerstein.
2021	Stanley Nelson (director/producer); Traci A. Curry (director/producer)	(United States)	Attica	Nominated	
2023	Moses Bwayo (director)	(Uganda)	Bobi Wine: The People's President	Nominated	Shared with Christopher Sharp and John Battsek.
2025	Alisa Payne; Nikon Kwantu	(United States)	The Perfect Neighbor	Nominated	Shared with Geeta Gandbhir and Sam Bisbee.

== Best Documentary Short Subject ==
Academy Award for Best Documentary Short Subject
Year	Name	Country	Film	Status	Milestone / Notes
2000	Leelai Demoz	(United States)	On Tiptoe: Gentle Steps to Freedom	Nominated	Shared with Eric Simonson. First African American to be nominated for Best Documentary Short Subject.
2009	Roger Ross Williams	(United States)	Music by Prudence	Won	Shared with Elinor Burkett. First African American to win Best Documentary Short Subject.
2020	Kris Bowers	(United States)	A Concerto Is a Conversation	Nominated	Shared with Ben Proudfoot.
2020	Sophia Nahli Allison; Janice Duncan	(United States)	A Love Song for Latasha	Nominated	First African American women to be nominated for Best Documentary Short Subject.
2023	Kris Bowers	(United States)	The Last Repair Shop	Won	First African American person to be nominated twice for Best Documentary Short Subject. Shared with Ben Proudfoot.
2023	Christine Turner	(United States)	The Barber of Little Rock	Nominated	Shared with John Hoffman.
2025	Christalyn Hampton	(United States)	The Devil Is Busy	Nominated	Shared with Geeta Gandbhir.

== Best Film Editing ==
Academy Award for Best Film Editing
Year	Name	Country	Film	Status	Milestone / Notes
1969	Hugh A. Robertson	(United States)	Midnight Cowboy	Nominated	First African American to be nominated for Best Editing.
2016	Joi McMillon	(United States)	Moonlight	Nominated	First African American woman to be nominated for Best Editing. Shared with Nat Sanders.

== Best International Feature Film ==
In the International Feature Film category (formerly known as Best Foreign Language Film), although the Oscar is presented to and accepted by the film's director, the submitting country is officially credited as the nominee, not the director. The following is a list of films directed by Black people which have been nominated for Best International Feature Film.

Academy Award for Best International Feature Film
Year	Director	Country	Film	Status	Milestone / Notes
1995	Rachid Bouchareb	(Algeria) Algeria	Dust of Life	Nominated	First Black director whose film was nominated for Best Foreign Language Film.
2006	Rachid Bouchareb	(Algeria) Algeria	Days of Glory	Nominated	First African director to have multiple films nominated for Best Foreign Language film.
2010	Rachid Bouchareb	(Algeria) Algeria	Outside the Law	Nominated	First African director whose films have received three nominations for Best Foreign Language Film.
2013	Abderrahmane Sissako	(Mauritania) Mauritania	Timbuktu	Nominated	
2019	Ladj Ly	(France) France	Les Miserables	Nominated	First non-African film directed by a Black director to be nominated in this category.

== Best Makeup and Hairstyling ==
Academy Award for Best Makeup and Hairstyling
Year	Name	Country	Film	Status	Milestone / Notes
2020	Mia Neal; Jamika Wilson	(United States)	Ma Rainey's Black Bottom	Won	First African Americans to be nominated for Best Makeup and Hairstyling. Shared with Sergio López-Rivera.
2021	Carla Farmer; Stacey Morris	(United States)	Coming 2 America	Nominated	Shared with Mike Marino.
2022	Camille Friend	(United States)	Black Panther: Wakanda Forever	Nominated	Shared with Joel Harlow.
2025	Shunika Terry	(United States)	Sinners	Nominated	Shared with Ken Diaz and Michael Fontaine.

== Best Music, Original Score ==
Academy Award for Best Original Score
Year	Name	Country	Film	Status	Milestone / Notes
1961	Duke Ellington	(United States)	Paris Blues	Nominated	First African American to be nominated for Best Original Score. Nominated for Best Music, Scoring of a Musical Picture.
1964	Calvin Jackson	(United States)	The Unsinkable Molly Brown	Nominated	Shared with Robert Armbruster, Leo Arnaud, Jack Elliott, Jack Hayes & Leo Shuken.
1967	Quincy Jones	(United States)	In Cold Blood	Nominated	
1972	Isaac Hayes	(United States)	Shaft	Nominated	Nominated for Best Music, Original Dramatic Score.
1972	Gil Askey	(United States)	Lady Sings the Blues	Nominated	First African American to be nominated in the Scoring Original Song Score and/or Adaptation (which is different from Best Original Score category).
1978	Quincy Jones	(United States)	The Wiz	Nominated	First African American to be nominated in the Original Song Score and Its Adaptation or Adaptation Score (which is different from Best Original Score category).
1984	Prince	(United States)	Purple Rain	Won	First African American winner of Best Original Song Score (which is different from Best Original Score category); this category was retired afterwards.
1985	Quincy Jones; Andrae Crouch; Caiphus Semenya	(United States) (United States) (South Africa)	The Color Purple	Nominated	Shared nomination with 9 other composers. Semenya became the first Black South African to be nominated for an Academy Award.
1986	Herbie Hancock	(United States)	Round Midnight	Won	First African-American winner of Best Original Score.
1987	Jonas Gwangwa	(South Africa)	Cry Freedom	Nominated	Shared with George Fenton.
2018	Terence Blanchard	(United States)	BlacKkKlansman	Nominated	
2020	Terence Blanchard	(United States)	Da 5 Bloods	Nominated	First African American to receive multiple solo nominations for Best Original Score. First time multiple African Americans received a nomination for Best Original Score in the same year.
2020	Jon Batiste	(United States)	Soul	Won	First time multiple African Americans received a nomination for Best Original Score in the same year. Shared with Trent Reznor and Atticus Ross.
2024	Kris Bowers	(United States)	The Wild Robot	Nominated	

== Best Music, Original Song ==
Academy Award for Best Original Song
Year	Name	Country	Film	Song	Status	Milestone / Notes
1967	Quincy Jones; Bob Russell	(United States)	Banning	"The Eyes of Love"	Nominated	First African Americans to be nominated for Best Original Song.
1968	Quincy Jones; Bob Russell	(United States)	For Love of Ivy	"For Love of Ivy"	Nominated	First African Americans to be nominated twice for Best Original Song.
1972	Isaac Hayes	(United States)	Shaft	"Theme from Shaft"	Won	First African-American winner for Best Original Song. First African-American to win a non-acting award.
1981	Lionel Richie	(United States)	Endless Love	"Endless Love"	Nominated	
1983	Irene Cara	(United States)	Flashdance	"Flashdance... What a Feeling"	Won	First African-American woman to win a non-acting Academy Award. Shared with Keith Forsey & Giorgio Moroder.
1984	Stevie Wonder	(United States)	The Woman in Red	"I Just Called to Say I Love You"	Won	
1984	Ray Parker Jr.	(United States)	Ghostbusters	"Ghostbusters"	Nominated	
1985	Lionel Richie	(United States)	White Nights	"Say You, Say Me"	Won	
1985	Quincy Jones; Lionel Richie	(United States)	The Color Purple	"Miss Celie's Blues"	Nominated	Shared nomination with Rod Temperton. Richie is the first (and to date, only) Black person to receive multiple Best Original Song nominations in the same year.
1987	Jonas Gwangwa	(South Africa)	Cry Freedom	"Cry Freedom"	Nominated	First Black South African to be nominated in this category. Shared with George Fenton.
1988	Lamont Dozier	(United States)	Buster	"Two Hearts"	Nominated	Shared with Phil Collins.
1993	Janet Jackson; Jimmy Jam; Terry Lewis	(United States)	Poetic Justice	"Again"	Nominated	
1993	James Ingram	(United States)	Beethoven's 2nd	"The Day I Fall In Love"	Nominated	Shared with Cliff Magness and Carole Bayer Sager.
1994	James Ingram	(United States)	Junior	"Look What Love Has Done"	Nominated	Shared with James Newton Howard, Carole Bayer Sager, and Patty Smyth.
2005	Frayser Boy; Juicy J DJ Paul	(United States)	Hustle & Flow	"It's Hard out Here for a Pimp"	Won	First African-American rappers to win an Academy Award.
2006	Siedah Garrett	(United States)	Dreamgirls	"Love You I Do"	Nominated	Shared with Henry Krieger.
2007	Jamal Joseph; Charles Mack; Tevin Thomas	(United States)	August Rush	"Raise It Up"	Nominated	
2011	Carlinhos Brown; Siedah Garrett	(Brazil) (United States)	Rio	"Real in Rio"	Nominated	Shared with Sergio Mendes. Garrett is the most nominated African-American female songwriter (two nominations). Brown is the first Black Latin American nominated for Best Original Song.
2013	Pharrell Williams	(United States)	Despicable Me 2	"Happy"	Nominated	
2014	Common; John Legend	(United States)	Selma	"Glory"	Won	
2015	DaHeala; The Weeknd	(Canada)	Fifty Shades of Grey	"Earned It"	Nominated	Shared with Belly and Stephan Moccio. DaHeala and the Weekend are the first Black Canadians nominated for Best Original Song.
2017	Mary J. Blige; Raphael Saadiq; Taura Stinson	(United States)	Mudbound	"Mighty River"	Nominated	Blige is also the first Black woman to receive multiple Academy Award nominations in the same year. First person nominated for an Academy Award for acting and writing an original song in the same year.
2017	Common	(United States)	Marshall	"Stand Up for Something"	Nominated	Shared with Diane Warren.
2018	Kendrick Lamar; Sounwave; SZA; Anthony Tiffith	(United States)	Black Panther	"All the Stars"	Nominated	
2019	Cynthia Erivo; Joshuah Brian Campbell	(United Kingdom) (United States)	Harriet	"Stand Up"	Nominated	Second Black woman to receive multiple Academy Award nominations in the same year. Second person nominated for an Academy Award for acting and writing an original song in the same year.
2020	H.E.R. D'Mile; Tiara Thomas	(United States)	Judas and the Black Messiah	"Fight For You"	Won	
2020	Leslie Odom Jr.	(United States)	One Night in Miami...	"Speak Now"	Nominated	First Black man to receive Academy Award nominations in the acting and music categories. Third person nominated for an Academy Award for acting and writing an original song in the same year. Shared with Sam Ashworth.
2020	Celeste	(United Kingdom)	The Trial of the Chicago 7	"Hear My Voice"	Nominated	Shared with Daniel Pemberton.
2021	Beyoncé; DIXSON	(United States)	King Richard	"Be Alive"	Nominated	
2022	Ryan Coogler; Rihanna; Tems	(United States) (Barbados) (Nigeria)	Black Panther: Wakanda Forever	"Lift Me Up"	Nominated	Shared with Ludwig Göransson.
2023	Jon Batiste	(United States)	American Symphony	"It Never Went Away"	Nominated	Shared with Dan Wilson.
2024	Abraham Alexander	(United States)	Sing Sing	"Like a Bird"	Nominated	Shared with Adrian Quesada.
2025	Raphael Saadiq	(United States)	Sinners	"I Lied to You"	Nominated	Shared with Ludwig Göransson.

== Best Picture ==
Academy Award for Best Picture
Year	Name	Country	Film	Status	Milestone / Notes
1985	Quincy Jones	(United States)	The Color Purple	Nominated	First African American producer whose film was nominated for Best Picture.
2009	Lee Daniels	(United States)	Precious	Nominated	First African American director whose film was nominated for Best Picture. First time two films with African American producers were nominated for Best Picture in the same year.
2009	Broderick Johnson	(United States)	The Blind Side	Nominated	First African American director whose film was nominated for Best Picture. First time two films with African American producers were nominated for Best Picture in the same year.
2012	Reginald Hudlin	(United States)	Django Unchained	Nominated	Shared with Stacey Sher and Pilar Savone.
2013	Steve McQueen	(United Kingdom)	12 Years a Slave	Won	First Black director and producer to win Best Picture.
2014	Oprah Winfrey	(United States)	Selma	Nominated	First Black female producer nominated for Best Picture.
2016	Denzel Washington	(United States)	Fences	Nominated	First time that three films with Black producers were nominated for Best Picture.
2016	Pharrell Williams	(United States)	Hidden Figures	Nominated	First time that three films with Black producers were nominated for Best Picture.
2016	Kimberly Steward	(United States)	Manchester by the Sea	Nominated	First time that three films with Black producers were nominated for Best Picture.
2017	Jordan Peele	(United States)	Get Out	Nominated	
2018	Spike Lee; Jordan Peele	(United States)	BlacKkKlansman	Nominated	The first Best Picture nominee to have more than one African American producer. Peele is the first African American producer to be nominated for Best Picture twice. Shared with Jason Blum, Raymond Mansfield, and Sean McKittrick
2020	Shaka King; Charles D. King; Ryan Coogler	(United States)	Judas and the Black Messiah	Nominated	First Best Picture nominee to have all black producers.
2021	Will Smith	(United States)	King Richard	Nominated	Shared with Tim White and Trevor White.
2023	Cord Jefferson; Jermaine Johnson	(United States)	American Fiction	Nominated	Shared with Ben LeClair and Nikos Karamigios.
2025	Zinzi Coogler; Ryan Coogler	(United States)	Sinners	Nominated	Ryan Coogler is the second African American producer to be nominated for Best Picture twice. Shared with Sev Ohanian.

== Best Production Design ==
Academy Award for Best Production Design
Year	Name	Country	Film	Status	Milestone / Notes
2018	Hannah Beachler	(United States)	Black Panther	Won	First African American to be nominated for and to win Best Production Design. Shared with Jay Hart.
2025	Hannah Beachler	(United States)	Sinners	Nominated	Shared with Monique Champagne.

== Best Short Film (Animated) ==
Academy Award for Best Animated Short Film
Year	Name	Country	Film	Status	Milestone / Notes
2017	Kobe Bryant	(United States)	Dear Basketball	Won	Shared nomination with Glen Keane. First African American to win Short Film (Animated). First former professional athlete to be nominated for and to win an Academy Award in any category. First person to win both an Olympic medal and an Academy Award.
2019	Matthew A. Cherry; Karen Rupert Toliver	(United States)	Hair Love	Won	Cherry is the second former professional athlete to be nominated for and to win an Academy Award in any category. Toliver is the first Black woman to win Short Film (Animated).

== Best Short Film (Live Action) ==
Academy Award for Best Live Action Short Film
Year	Name	Country	Film	Status	Milestone / Notes
1991	David Massey	(United States)	Last Breeze of Summer	Nominated	First African American nominated for Short Film (Live Action).
1995	Dianne Houston	(United States)	Tuesday Morning Ride	Nominated	First African-American woman nominated for Short Film (Live Action). Shared with Joy Ride.
2014	James Lucas	(United Kingdom) (New Zealand)	The Phone Call	Won	First Black person to win in this category. Shared with Mat Kirkby.
2017	Kevin Wilson Jr.	(United States)	My Nephew Emmett	Nominated	
2020	Travon Free	(United States)	Two Distant Strangers	Won	First Black-American to win in this category Shared with Martin Desmond Roe.
2023	Misan Harriman	(United States)	The After	Nominated	Shared with Nicky Bentham.

== Best Sound ==
From 1963 to 1967, Best Sound Effects was awarded in addition to Best Sound. Until 1982, a Special Achievement Award for Sound Effects was sometimes given. From 1983 until 2000, Sound Effects Editing was given as well as Best Sound. From 2001 through 2019, the category was known as "Best Sound Editing" or "Best Sound Mixing", plus the usual Best Sound award. From 2020 onward, the awards were merged into one: Best Sound

Academy Award for Best Sound
Year	Name	Country	Film	Status	Milestone / Notes
1978	Willie D. Burton	(United States)	The Buddy Holly Story	Nominated	First African American to be nominated for Best Sound.
1980	Willie D. Burton	(United States)	Altered States	Nominated	First African American to be nominated multiple times for Best Sound.
1983	Willie D. Burton	(United States)	WarGames	Nominated	
1988	Willie D. Burton	(United States)	Bird	Won	First African American to win Best Sound.
1989	Russell Williams II	(United States)	Glory	Won	Second African American to win Best Sound.
1990	Russell Williams II	(United States)	Dances with Wolves	Won	First African American to win multiple Academy Awards in any category. First and only African American to win consecutive awards in any category.
1994	Willie D. Burton	(United States)	The Shawshank Redemption	Nominated	
1999	Willie D. Burton	(United States)	The Green Mile	Nominated	
2006	Willie D. Burton	(United States)	Dreamgirls	Won	The third African American to win two competitive Academy Awards.
2021	Denise Yarde	(United Kingdom)	Belfast	Nominated	First Black woman to be nominated for Sound. Shared with Simon Chase, James Mather and Niv Adiri.
2023	Willie D. Burton	(United States)	Oppenheimer	Nominated	

== Best Writing (Adapted Screenplay) ==
Academy Award for Best Adapted Screenplay
Year	Name	Country	Film	Adapted From	Status	Milestone / Notes
1972	Lonne Elder III	(United States)	Sounder	Sounder by William H. Armstrong	Nominated	First African-American nominee for Best Writing (Adapted Screenplay). First African-American nominated for screenwriting, along with Suzanne de Passe for Lady Sings the Blues nominated the same year for Best Writing (Original Screenplay).
1984	Charles Fuller	(United States)	A Soldier's Story	A Soldier's Play by Fuller	Nominated	
2009	Geoffrey Fletcher	(United States)	Precious	Push by Sapphire	Won	First African American to win a screenplay Academy Award (Adapted Screenplay).
2013	John Ridley	(United States)	12 Years a Slave	Twelve Years a Slave by Solomon Northup	Won	First African-American writer to have written a film that won Best Picture.
2016	Barry Jenkins; Tarell Alvin McCraney	(United States)	Moonlight	In Moonlight Black Boys Look Blue by McCraney	Won	First film to have two African-American screenwriters nominated and to win. Second film to have African-American writers that won Best Picture. First time two films written by African-Americans were nominated in the same year.
2016	August Wilson	(United States)	Fences	Fences by Wilson	Nominated	First African-American writer to receive a posthumous nomination in a writing category. First time two films written by African-Americans were nominated in the same year.
2017	Virgil Williams; Dee Rees	(United States)	Mudbound	Mudbound by Hillary Jordan	Nominated	Rees is the second Black woman to be nominated for a Screenplay Oscar. Rees is the first black woman to be nominated for Best Adapted Screenplay.
2018	Kevin Willmott; Spike Lee	(United States)	BlacKkKlansman	Black Klansman by Ron Stallworth	Won	Shared with Charlie Wachtel & David Rabinowitz. Lee is the first Black screenwriter to be nominated for both Best Original and Best Adapted Screenplay. Lee is the first Black filmmaker to win a competitive Oscar after receiving an Honorary Academy Award. Along with Barry Jenkins nominated the same year for If Beale Street Could Talk, Lee and Jenkins are the first two black people to be nominated for screenwriting twice.
2018	Barry Jenkins	(United States)	If Beale Street Could Talk	If Beale Street Could Talk by James Baldwin	Nominated	First Black person to have two nominations for Best Adapted Screenplay. Along with Spike Lee nominated the same year for BlacKkKlansman, Jenkins and Lee are the first two Black people to be nominated for screenwriting twice.
2020	Kemp Powers	(United States)	One Night in Miami...	One Night in Miami by Powers	Nominated	
2023	Cord Jefferson	(United States)	American Fiction	Erasure by Percival Everett	Won	
2024	RaMell Ross	(United States)	Nickel Boys	The Nickel Boys by Colson Whitehead	Nominated	Shared with Joslyn Barnes.
2024	Clarence Maclin; John "Divine G" Whitfield	(United States)	Sing Sing	The Sing Sing Follies by John H. Richardson	Nominated	Shared with Clint Bentley and Greg Kwedar.

== Best Writing (Original Screenplay) ==
Academy Award for Best Original Screenplay
Year	Name	Country	Film	Status	Milestone / Notes
1972	Suzanne de Passe	(United States)	Lady Sings the Blues	Nominated	Shared nomination with co-writers Chris Clark and Terence McCloy. First African-American nominee for Best Writing (Original Screenplay). First African-American nominated for screenwriting, along with Lonne Elder III for Sounder nominated the same year for Best Writing (Adapted Screenplay). First African-American woman nominated for screenwriting. First African-American woman nominated for Best Writing (Original Screenplay).
1989	Spike Lee	(United States)	Do the Right Thing	Nominated	First African-American man nominated for Best Writing (Original Screenplay).
1991	John Singleton	(United States)	Boyz n the Hood	Nominated	Youngest person to be nominated in this category (age 24).
2017	Jordan Peele	(United States)	Get Out	Won	First African-American to win Best Writing (Original Screenplay). First African-American to be nominated for and to win Best Writing (Original Screenplay) for a debut film.
2020	Shaka King; Kenny Lucas; Keith Lucas	(United States)	Judas and the Black Messiah	Nominated	First film to have multiple African-American screenwriters nominated for Best Original Screenplay. Shared with Will Berson.
2025	Ryan Coogler	(United States)	Sinners	Won	

== Special awards ==
Special Awards
Year	Name	Award
1947	James Baskett	Academy Special Award, for his characterization of Uncle Remus in Song of the South. First Black man to receive an Oscar.
1995	Quincy Jones	Jean Hersholt Humanitarian Award
2001	Sidney Poitier	Academy Honorary Award, "for his extraordinary performances and unique presence on the screen and for representing the industry with dignity, style and intelligence".
2011	James Earl Jones	Academy Honorary Award, "for his legacy of consistent excellence and uncommon versatility"
2011	Oprah Winfrey	Jean Hersholt Humanitarian Award
2014	Harry Belafonte	Jean Hersholt Humanitarian Award
2015	Spike Lee	Academy Honorary Award, "filmmaker, educator, motivator, iconoclast, artist […] [and] a champion of independent film and an inspiration to young filmmakers"
2017	Charles Burnett	Academy Honorary Award, “A resolutely independent and influential film pioneer who has chronicled the lives of Black Americans with eloquence and insight.”
2018	Cicely Tyson	Academy Honorary Award, "Whose unforgettable performances and personal integrity have inspired generations of filmmakers, actors and audiences"
2020	Tyler Perry	Jean Hersholt Humanitarian Award
2021	Danny Glover	Jean Hersholt Humanitarian Award
2021	Samuel L. Jackson	Academy Honorary Award, "Sam Jackson is a cultural icon whose dynamic work has resonated across decades and generations and audiences worldwide"
2022	Euzhan Palcy	Academy Honorary Award, "a pioneering filmmaker whose groundbreaking significance in international cinema is cemented in film history"
2023	Angela Bassett	Academy Honorary Award, "Across her decades-long career, Angela Bassett has continued to deliver transcendent performances that set new standards in acting"
2024	Quincy Jones	Academy Honorary Award, "for his artistic genius, relentless creativity and trailblazing legacy in film music". First Black person to receive two Honorary Oscars. First Black person to receive a posthumous Honorary Oscar.
2025	Debbie Allen	Academy Honorary Award, "Debbie Allen is a trailblazing choreographer and actor, whose work has captivated generations and crossed genres."
2025	Wynn Thomas	Academy Honorary Award, "Production designer Wynn Thomas has brought some of the most enduring films to life through a visionary eye and mastery of his craft."

== Nominees by decade (acting categories) ==
Decade	1930s	1940s	1950s	1960s	1970s	1980s	1990s	2000s	2010s	2020s†
Lead Actor	0	0	1	1	2	2	4	8	5	7
Lead Actress	0	0	1	0	3	1	1	2	4	3
Supp. Actor	0	0	0	1	0	6	4	5	3	6
Supp. Actress	1	1	1	1	0	3	2	7	8	8
Total	1	1	3	3	5	12	11	22	20	24

† Through the 98th Academy Awards.

== See also ==
- Cheryl Boone Isaacs, first African-American president of the Academy of Motion Picture Arts and Sciences (but not herself an Oscar winner or nominee)
- African-American Tony nominees and winners
- List of Academy Award winners and nominees of Asian descent
- List of African Academy Award winners and nominees
- List of black Golden Globe Award winners and nominees
- List of Hispanic Academy Award winners and nominees
- List of Indigenous Academy Award winners and nominees
