= San Francisco Film Critics Circle Awards 2003 =

Annual US film awards ceremony

2nd SFFCC Awards

December 15, 2003

Best Picture:
Lost in Translation

The 2nd San Francisco Film Critics Circle Awards, honoring the best in film for 2003, were given on 15 December 2003.

== Winners ==
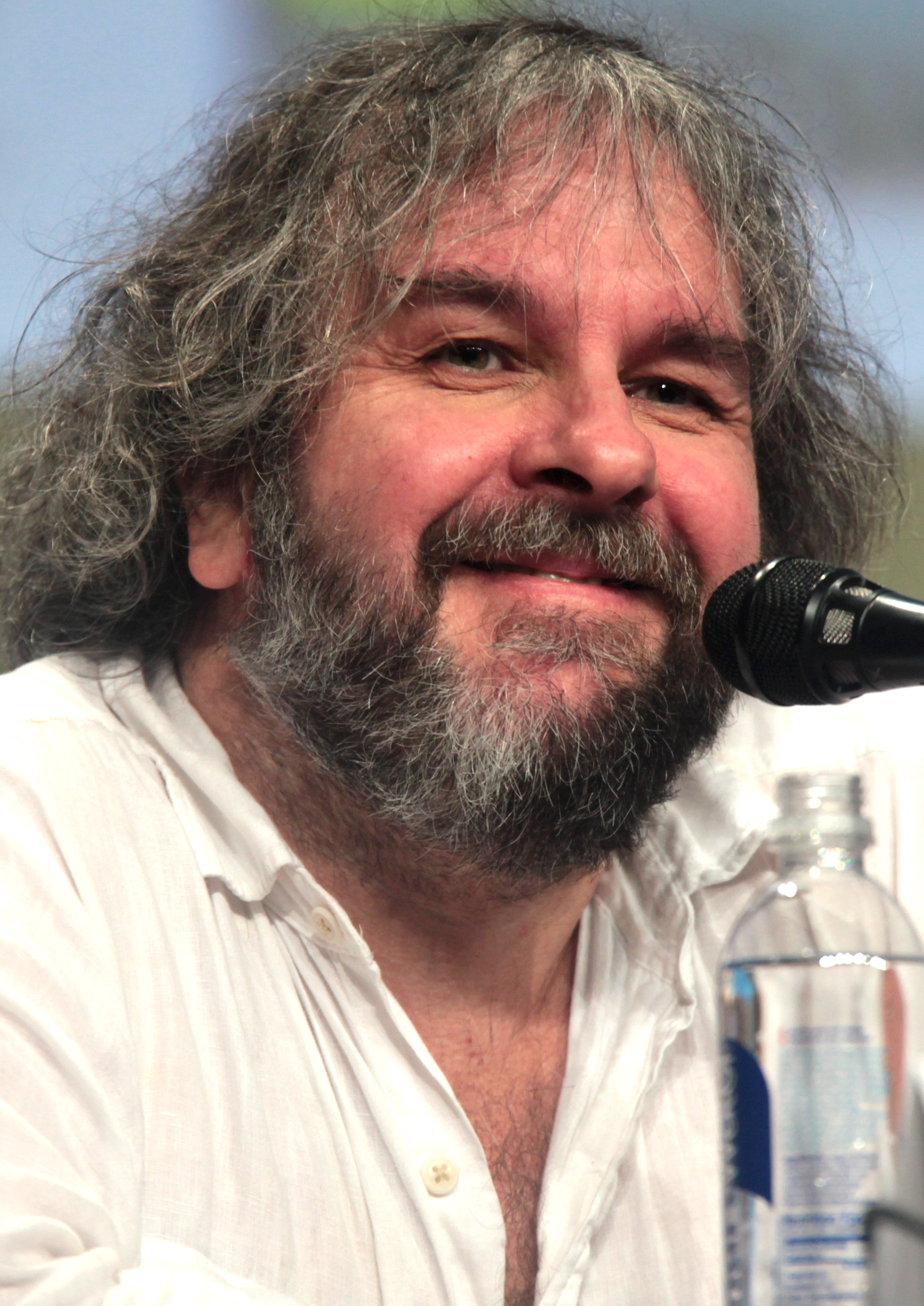
Peter Jackson, Best Director winner

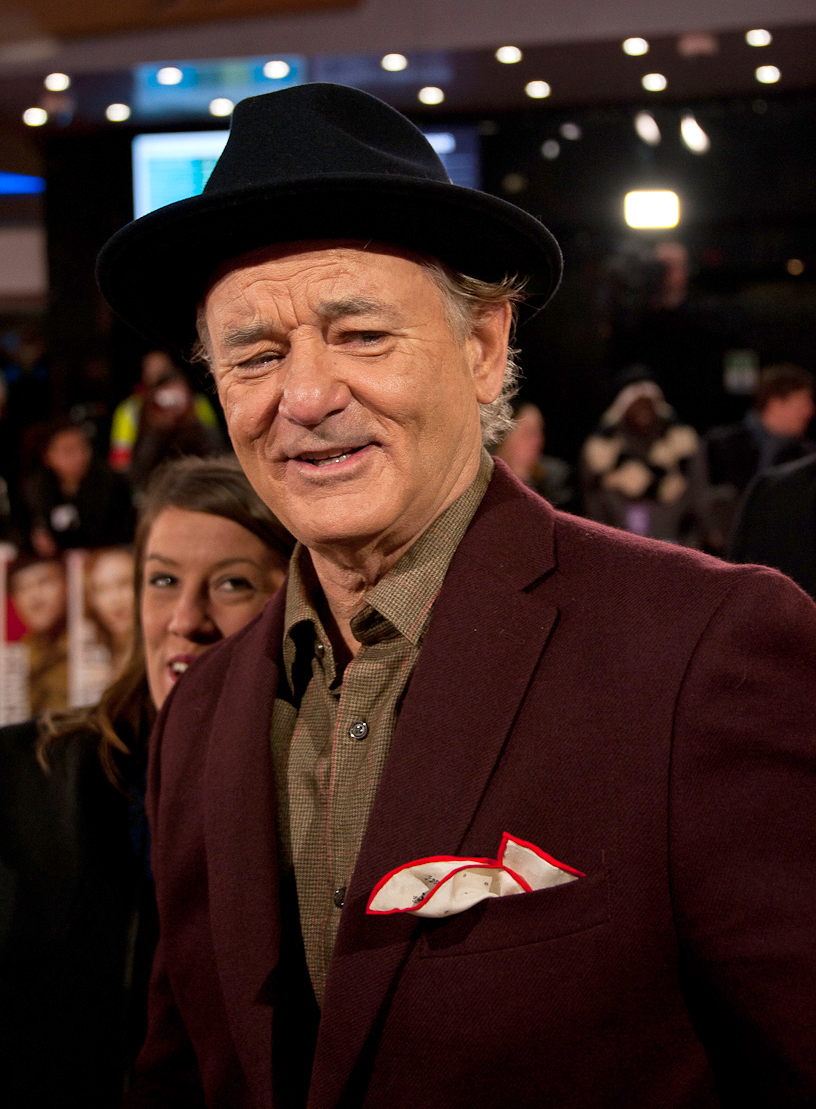
Bill Murray, Best Actor winner

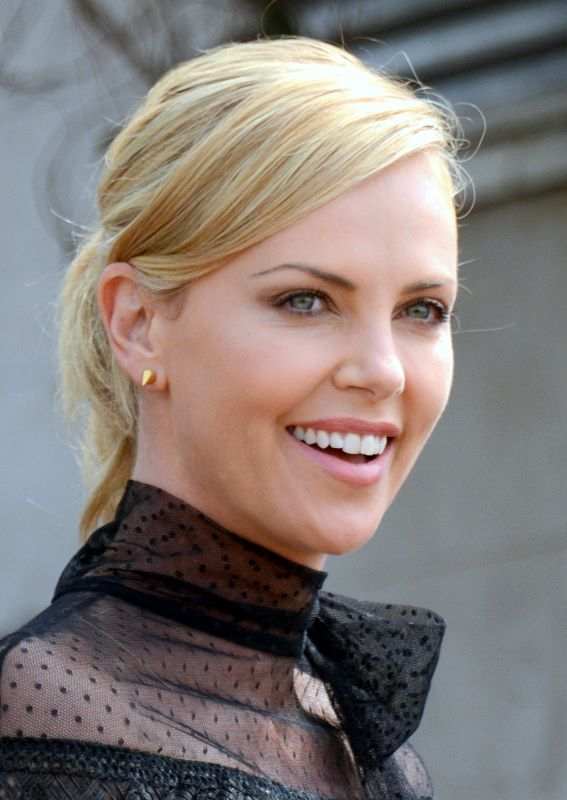
Charlize Theron, Best Actress winner

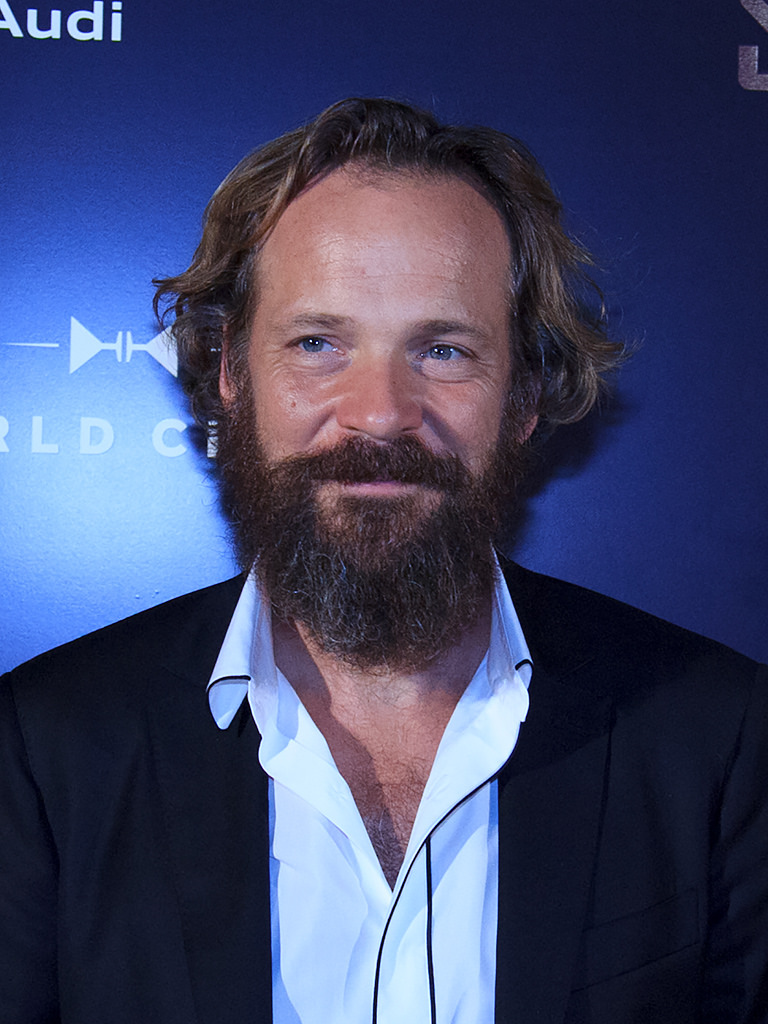
Peter Sarsgaard, Best Supporting Actor winner

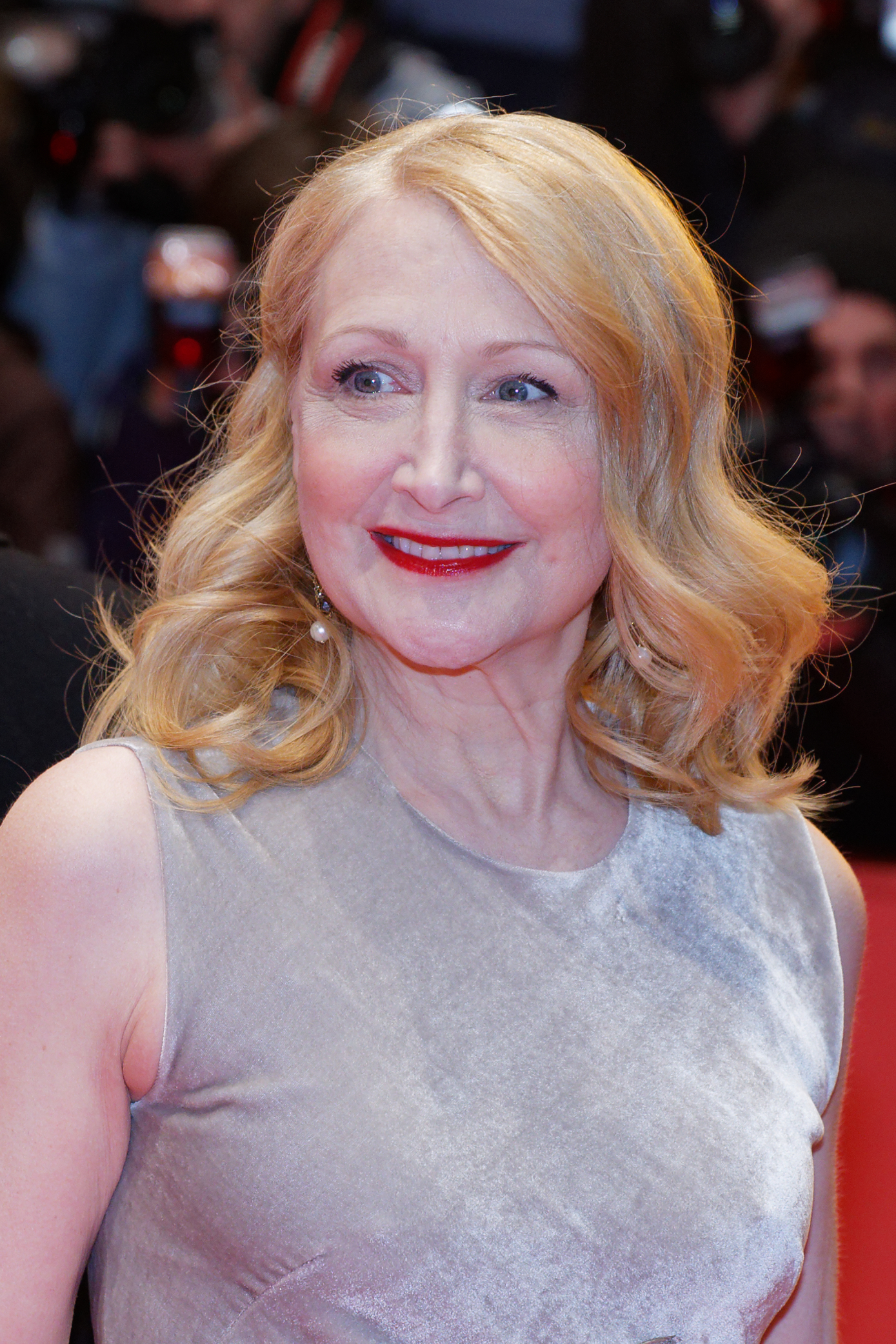
Patricia Clarkson, Best Supporting Actress winner

- Best Picture:
  - Lost in Translation
- Best Director:
  - Peter Jackson - The Lord of the Rings: The Return of the King
- Best Actor:
  - Bill Murray - Lost in Translation
- Best Actress:
  - Charlize Theron - Monster
- Best Supporting Actor:
  - Peter Sarsgaard - Shattered Glass
- Best Supporting Actress:
  - Patricia Clarkson - Pieces of April
- Best Foreign Language Film:
  - The Son (Le fils) • Belgium/France
- Best Documentary:
  - Capturing the Friedmans
- Marlon Riggs Award (for courage & vision in Bay Area filmmaking):
  - Sam Green - The Weather Underground
- Special Citation:
  - Russian Ark (better late than never to honor a brilliant, innovative film released too late to honor in 2002)
