= Charlize Theron =

South African-American actress (born 1975)

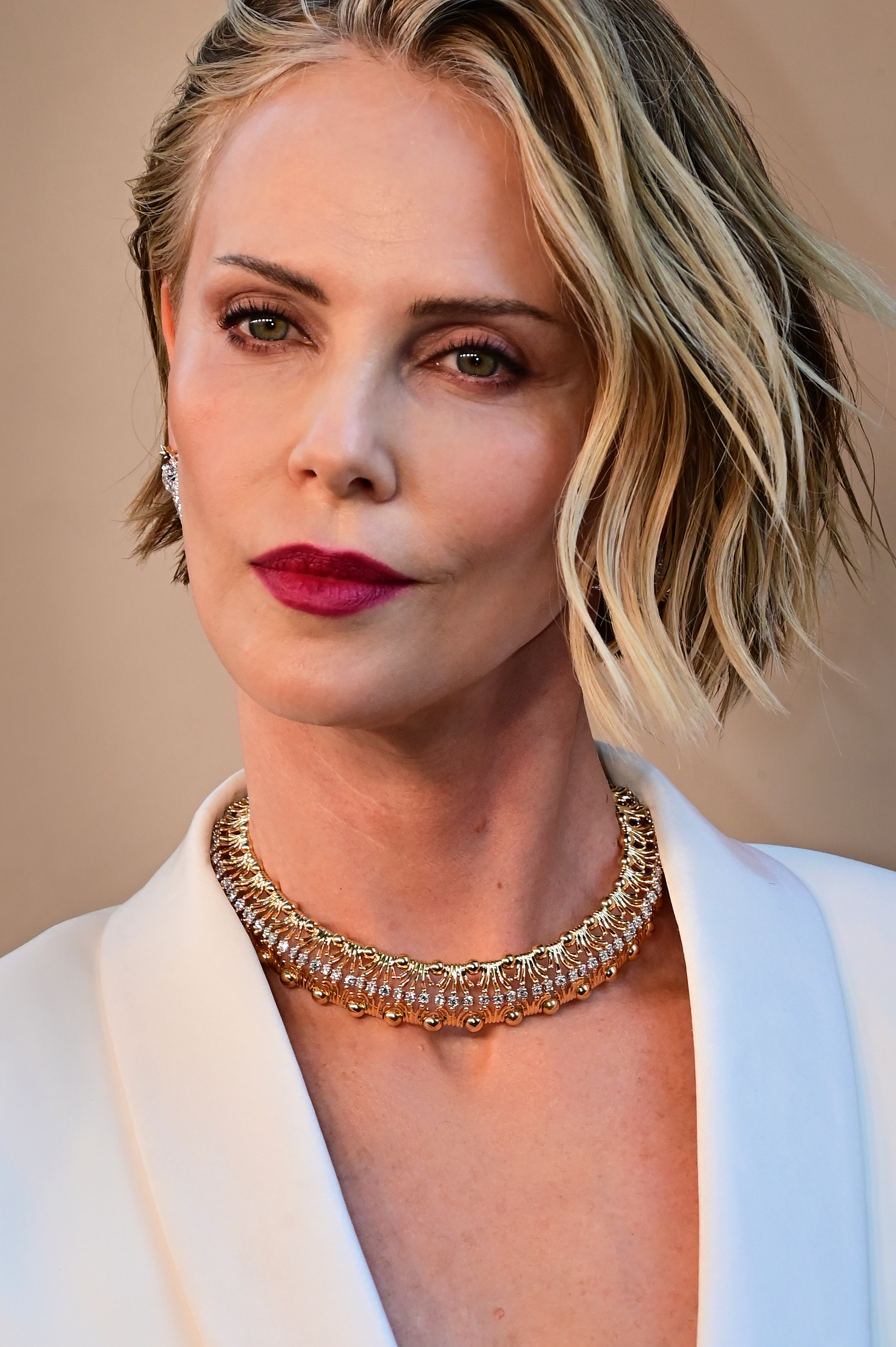
- Theron in 2026
- Born: 7 August 1975 (age 51); Benoni, Transvaal, (Note: Now Gauteng) South Africa
- Citizenship: South Africa; United States
- Occupations: Actress; film producer
- Years active: 1995–present
- Organization: Denver and Delilah Productions
- Works: Filmography
- Partner: Stuart Townsend (2001–2009)
- Children: 2
- Awards: Full list

Charlize Theron (Note: Pronunciation: /ʃɑːrˈliːz ˈθɛrən/, shar-LEEZ THERR-ən Afrikaans: [ʃarˈlis ˈtrɔn]) (born 7 August 1975) is a South African and American actress and producer. One of the world's highest-paid actresses, her accolades include an Academy Award and a Golden Globe Award, in addition to nominations for three BAFTAs and two Emmy Awards.

Theron came to international prominence in the 1990s after starring in the films The Devil's Advocate (1997), Mighty Joe Young (1998), and The Cider House Rules (1999). She received critical acclaim for her portrayal of serial killer Aileen Wuornos in Monster (2003), for which she won the Silver Bear and Academy Award for Best Actress, becoming the first South African to win an acting Oscar. She was nominated twice more for the Oscar for portraying a sexually abused woman seeking justice in the drama North Country (2005) and Megyn Kelly in the biographical drama Bombshell (2019). She received praise for playing troubled women in Jason Reitman's comedy-dramas Young Adult (2011) and Tully (2018).

Theron has starred in several commercially successful action films, including The Italian Job (2003), Hancock (2008), Prometheus (2012), Mad Max: Fury Road (2015), Atomic Blonde (2017), The Old Guard (2020), and The Old Guard 2 (2025) as well as several Fast & Furious installments: The Fate of the Furious (2017), F9 (2021), and Fast X (2023). On television, she earned a nomination for the Primetime Emmy Award for her portrayal of Britt Ekland in the biographical film The Life and Death of Peter Sellers (2004).

Since the early 2000s, Theron has ventured into film production with her company Denver and Delilah Productions. She has produced numerous films, many in which she had a starring role, including The Burning Plain (2008), Dark Places (2015), and Long Shot (2019). Theron became an American citizen in 2007, while retaining her South African citizenship. In 2016, Time named her one of the 100 most influential people in the world.

== Early life ==
Charlize Theron was born in South Africa, in Benoni in Transvaal Province (Gauteng Province since 1994). She is the only child of road builders Gerda (née Maritz) and Charles Theron. Her great-granduncle was Second Boer War military leader Daniel Theron. She is from an Afrikaner family, and her ancestry includes Dutch as well as French and German. Her French forebears were early Huguenots in South Africa. Although Theron is fluent in English, her first language is Afrikaans. She grew up on her parents' farm in Benoni, near Johannesburg.

When Theron was 15, on 21 June 1991, her mother killed her father in self-defense. It happened after her father, an alcoholic, drunkenly attacked her mother and fired a gun at Charlize and her mother. Theron's mother retrieved her own handgun, shot back and killed him. The shooting was legally adjudged to have been self-defense, and her mother faced no charges.

Growing up, Theron felt she did not fit in at school and was teased by other girls. She was frequently unwell with jaundice throughout childhood and the antibiotics she was administered made her upper incisor baby teeth rot; they had to be surgically removed. Theron's permanent teeth did not grow until she was roughly ten years old. She attended Putfontein Primary School (Laerskool Putfontein). At 13, Theron was sent to boarding school and began her studies at the National School of the Arts in Johannesburg. About her early life in her home country, Theron has said: "I grew up as an only child in South Africa, and there was turmoil in my family, but the surroundings were so great. I was usually barefoot in the dirt: no Game Boys, no computers, and we had sanctions, so there were no concerts. This meant you had to entertain yourself."

== Career ==
=== 1991–2002: Early work and breakthrough ===
Although she saw herself as a dancer, Theron left South Africa at age 16 to begin a modeling career in Europe. That same year, she won a one-year modelling contract at a local competition in Salerno, Italy and moved with her mother to Milan, Italy. After Theron spent a year modelling throughout Europe, she and her mother moved to the United States; they resided in New York City and Miami. In New York, she attended the Joffrey Ballet School, where she trained as a ballet dancer until a knee injury closed this career path. As Theron recalled in 2008:

I went to New York for three days to model, and then I spent a winter in New York in a friend's windowless basement apartment. I was broke, I was taking class at the Joffrey Ballet, and my knees gave out. I realized I couldn't dance anymore, and I went into a major depression. My mom came over from South Africa and said, "Either you figure out what to do next or you come home, because you can sulk in South Africa".

In 1994, Theron flew to Los Angeles on a one-way ticket her mother bought for her; she intended to work in the film industry. During her initial months there, she lived in a motel with the $300 budget that her mother had given her; she continued receiving checks from New York and lived "from paycheck to paycheck". Theron stole bread from a basket in a restaurant to survive. One day, she went to a Hollywood Boulevard bank to cash a few checks, including one her mother had sent to help with the rent; however; the check from her mother was rejected because it was out-of-state and she was not an American citizen. Theron argued and pleaded with the bank teller until talent agent John Crosby, who was the next customer behind her, cashed it for her and gave her his business card.

Crosby introduced Theron to an acting school. In 1995, she played her first non-speaking film role in the horror film Children of the Corn III: Urban Harvest. In Theron's first speaking role, she portrayed hitwoman Helga Svelgen in 2 Days in the Valley (1996). Despite the film's mixed reviews, Theron drew attention due to her beauty and to a scene in which she fought Teri Hatcher's character. Theron feared being typecast as characters similar to Helga and recalled being asked to repeat her performance in the film during auditions: "A lot of people were saying, 'You should just hit while the iron's hot' [...] But playing the same part over and over doesn't leave you with any longevity. And I knew it was going to be harder for me, because of what I look like, to branch out to different kinds of roles".

When auditioning for Showgirls, Theron was introduced to talent agent J. J. Harris by co-casting director Johanna Ray. She recalled being surprised at how much faith Harris had in her potential. Theron has referred to Harris as her mentor. Harris found scripts and films for Theron in a variety of genres and encouraged her to become a producer. She served as Theron's agent for over 15 years.

Theron's career expanded by the end of the 1990s. In the horror drama The Devil's Advocate (1997), which is credited as her break-out film, Theron starred alongside Keanu Reeves and Al Pacino as the haunted wife of an unusually successful lawyer. She subsequently starred in the adventure film Mighty Joe Young (1998) as the friend and protector of a giant mountain gorilla, and in the drama The Cider House Rules (1999), as a woman who seeks an abortion in World War II-era Maine. While Mighty Joe Young flopped at the box office, The Devil's Advocate and The Cider House Rules were commercially successful. She appeared on the cover of the January 1999 issue of Vanity Fair as the "White Hot Venus". The May 1999 issue of Playboy magazine also featured Theron on its cover; the photos of Theron used by Playboy had been taken several years earlier when she was an unknown model, and Theron unsuccessfully sued the magazine for publishing them without her consent.

By the early 2000s, Theron continued to steadily take on roles in films such as Reindeer Games (2000), The Yards (2000), The Legend of Bagger Vance (2000), Men of Honor (2000), Sweet November (2001), The Curse of the Jade Scorpion (2001), and Trapped (2002), all of which, despite achieving only limited commercial success, helped to establish her as an actress. On this period in her career, Theron remarked: "I kept finding myself in a place where directors would back me but studios didn't. [I began] a love affair with directors, the ones I really, truly admired. I found myself making really bad movies, too. Reindeer Games was not a good movie, but I did it because I loved [director] John Frankenheimer".

=== 2003–2010: Rise to prominence ===
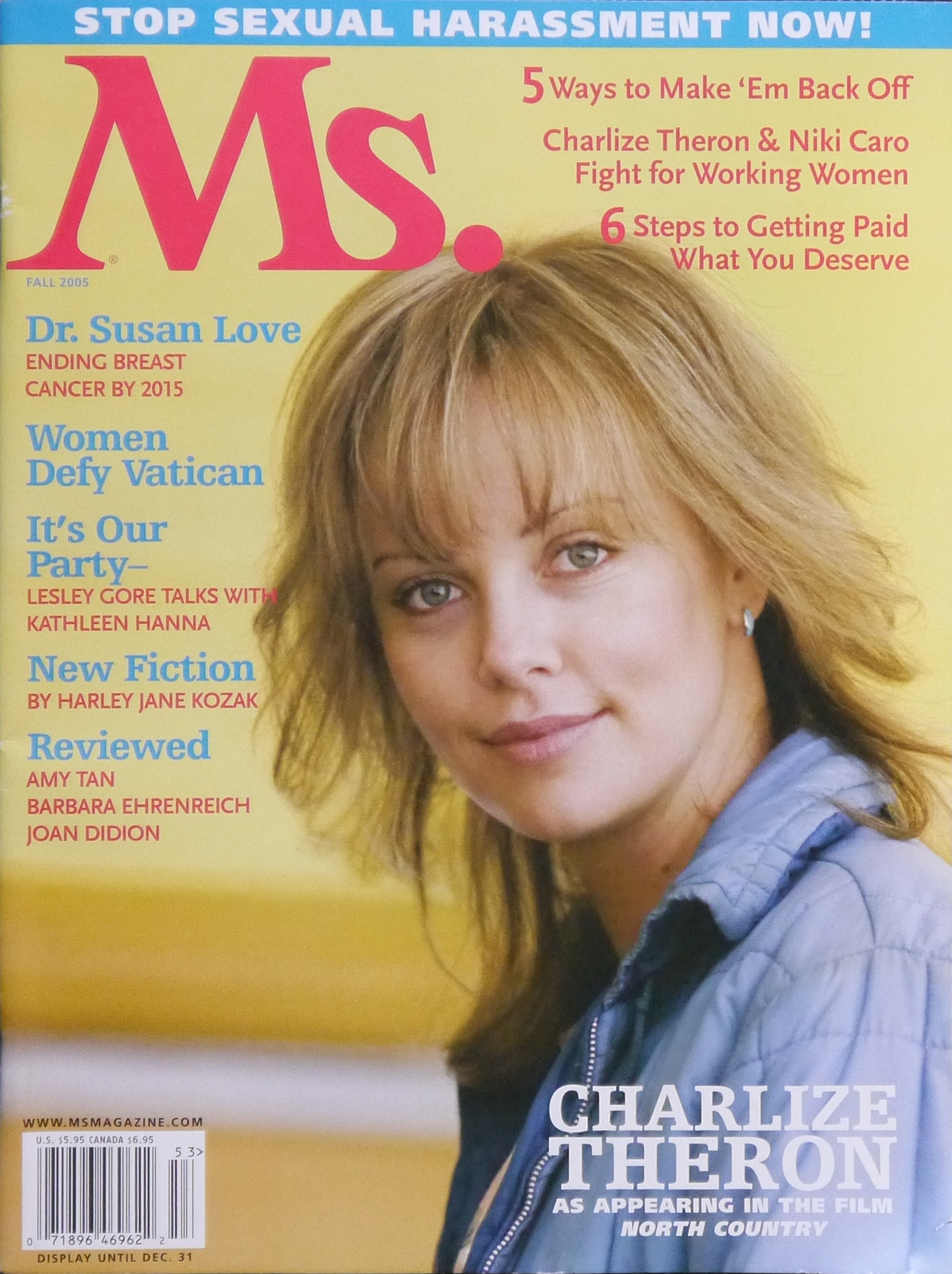
Theron on the cover of Ms. magazine in 2005

Theron starred as a safe and vault technician in the 2003 heist film The Italian Job, an American remake of the 1969 British film of the same name, directed by F. Gary Gray and opposite Mark Wahlberg, Edward Norton, Jason Statham, Seth Green, and Donald Sutherland. The film was a box office success, grossing US$176 million worldwide.

In Monster (2003), Theron portrayed serial killer Aileen Wuornos, a former prostitute who was executed in Florida in 2002 for killing six men (she was not tried for a seventh murder) in the late 1980s and early 1990s; film critic Roger Ebert felt that Theron gave "one of the greatest performances in the history of the cinema". For her portrayal, she was awarded the Academy Award for Best Actress at the 76th Academy Awards in February 2004, as well as the Actor Award for Outstanding Performance by a Female Actor in a Leading Role and the Golden Globe Award for Best Actress in a Motion Picture – Drama, in addition to being nominated for the BAFTA Award for Best Actress in a Leading Role. She is the first South African to win an Oscar for Best Actress. The Oscar win pushed her to The Hollywood Reporter's 2006 list of highest-paid actresses in Hollywood, earning up to US$10 million for a film; she ranked seventh. AskMen named her the number one most desirable woman of 2003.

For her role as Swedish actress and singer Britt Ekland in the 2004 HBO film The Life and Death of Peter Sellers, Theron garnered Golden Globe Award and Primetime Emmy Award nominations. In 2005, she portrayed Rita, the mentally challenged love interest of Michael Bluth (Jason Bateman), on the third season of Fox's television series Arrested Development, and starred in the financially unsuccessful science fiction thriller Æon Flux; for her voice-over work in the Aeon Flux video game, she received a Spike Video Game Award for Best Performance by a Human Female.

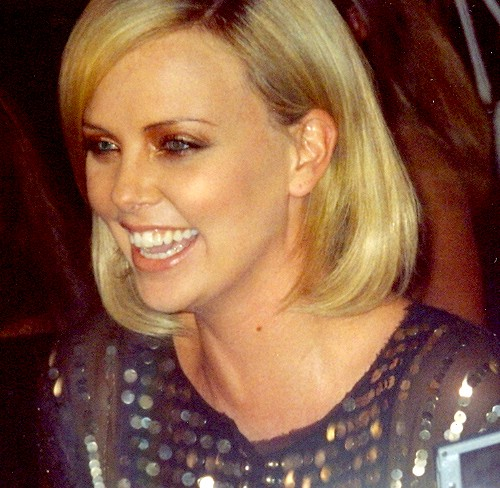
Theron attending the premiere of North Country at the 2005 Toronto International Film Festival

In the critically acclaimed drama North Country (2005), Theron played a single mother and an iron mine worker experiencing sexual harassment. David Rooney of Variety wrote: "The film represents a confident next step for lead Charlize Theron. Though the challenges of following a career-redefining Oscar role have stymied actresses, Theron segues from Monster to a performance in many ways more accomplished [...] The strength of both the performance and character anchor the film firmly in the tradition of other dramas about working-class women leading the fight over industrial workplace issues, such as Norma Rae or Silkwood." Roger Ebert echoed the same sentiment, calling her "an actress who has the beauty of a fashion model but has found resources within herself for these powerful roles about unglamorous women in the world of men." For her performance, she received Academy Award, BAFTA Award, and Golden Globe Award nominations for Best Lead Actress. Ms. magazine honoured her for this performance with a feature article in its Fall 2005 issue. On 30 September 2005, Theron received a star on the Hollywood Walk of Fame.

In 2007, Theron played a police detective in the critically acclaimed crime film In the Valley of Elah, and produced and starred as a reckless, slatternly mother in the drama film Sleepwalking, alongside Nick Stahl and AnnaSophia Robb. The Christian Science Monitor praised the latter film, commenting that "Despite its deficiencies, and the inadequate screen time allotted to Theron (who's quite good), Sleepwalking has a core of feeling". In 2008, Theron starred as a woman who faced a traumatic childhood in the drama The Burning Plain, directed by Guillermo Arriaga and opposite Jennifer Lawrence and Kim Basinger, and played the ex-wife of an alcoholic superhero alongside Will Smith in the superhero film Hancock. The Burning Plain found a limited release in US theatres, but grossed $5,267,917 outside the US. Hancock made US$624.3 million worldwide. Also in 2008, Theron was named the Hasty Pudding Theatricals Woman of the Year, and was asked to be a UN Messenger of Peace by the UN Secretary-General Ban Ki-moon.

Her film releases in 2009 were the post-apocalyptic drama The Road, in which she briefly appears in flashbacks, and the animated film Astro Boy, providing her voice for a character. On 4 December 2009, Theron co-presented the draw for the 2010 FIFA World Cup in Cape Town, South Africa, accompanied by several other celebrities of South African nationality or ancestry. During rehearsals she drew an Ireland ball instead of France as a joke at the expense of FIFA, referring to Thierry Henry's handball controversy in the play-off match between France and Ireland. The stunt alarmed FIFA enough for it to fear she might do it again in front of a live global audience.

=== 2011–2019: Established actress ===
Following a two-year hiatus from films, Theron returned to the spotlight in 2011 with the black comedy Young Adult. Directed by Jason Reitman, the film earned critical acclaim, particularly for her performance as a depressed, divorced, alcoholic 37-year-old ghostwriter. Richard Roeper awarded the film an A grade, stating "Charlize Theron delivers one of the most impressive performances of the year". She was nominated for a Golden Globe Award and several other awards. Roger Ebert called her one of the best actors working today.

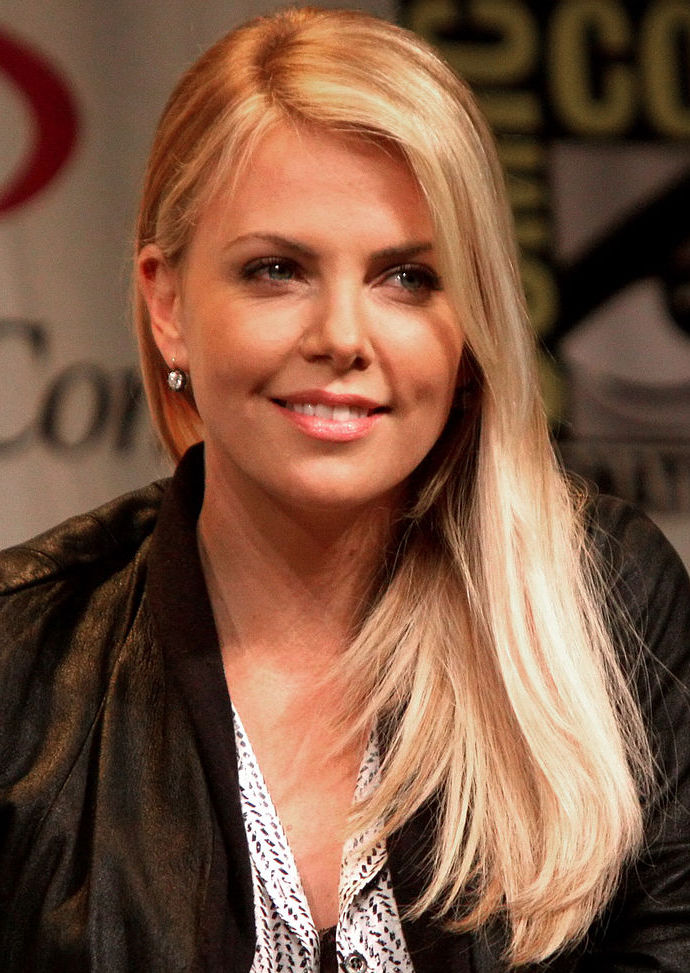
Theron promoting Prometheus at the 2012 WonderCon

In 2012, Theron took on the role of villain in two big-budgeted films. She played Evil Queen Ravenna, Snow White's evil stepmother, in Snow White and the Huntsman, opposite Kristen Stewart and Chris Hemsworth, and appeared as a crew member with a hidden agenda in Ridley Scott's Prometheus. Mick LaSalle of the San Francisco Chronicle found Snow White and the Huntsman to be "[a] slow, boring film that has no charm and is highlighted only by a handful of special effects and Charlize Theron's truly evil queen", while The Hollywood Reporter writer Todd McCarthy, describing her role in Prometheus, asserted: "Theron is in ice goddess mode here, with the emphasis on ice [...] but perfect for the role all the same". Both films were major box office hits, grossing around US$400 million internationally each. The following year, Vulture/NYMag named her the 68th Most Valuable Star in Hollywood saying: "We're just happy that Theron can stay on the list in a year when she didn't come out with anything [...] any actress who's got that kind of skill, beauty, and ferocity ought to have a permanent place in Hollywood". On 10 May 2014, Theron hosted Saturday Night Live on NBC. In 2014, Theron took on the role of the wife of an infamous outlaw in the western comedy film A Million Ways to Die in the West, directed by Seth MacFarlane, which was met with mediocre reviews and moderate box office returns.

In 2015, Theron played the sole survivor of the massacre of her family in the film adaptation of the Gillian Flynn novel Dark Places, directed by Gilles Paquet-Brenner, in which she had a producer credit, and starred as Imperator Furiosa in Mad Max: Fury Road (2015), opposite Tom Hardy. Mad Max received widespread critical acclaim, with praise going towards Theron for the dominant nature taken by her character. The film made US$378.4 million worldwide. She next reprised her role as Queen Ravenna in the 2016 film The Huntsman: Winter's War, a sequel to Snow White and the Huntsman, which was a critical and commercial failure. In 2016, Theron starred as a physician and activist working in West Africa in the little-seen romantic drama The Last Face, with Sean Penn, provided her voice for the 3D stop-motion fantasy film Kubo and the Two Strings, and produced the independent drama Brain on Fire. That year, Time named her in the Time 100 list of the most influential people in the world.

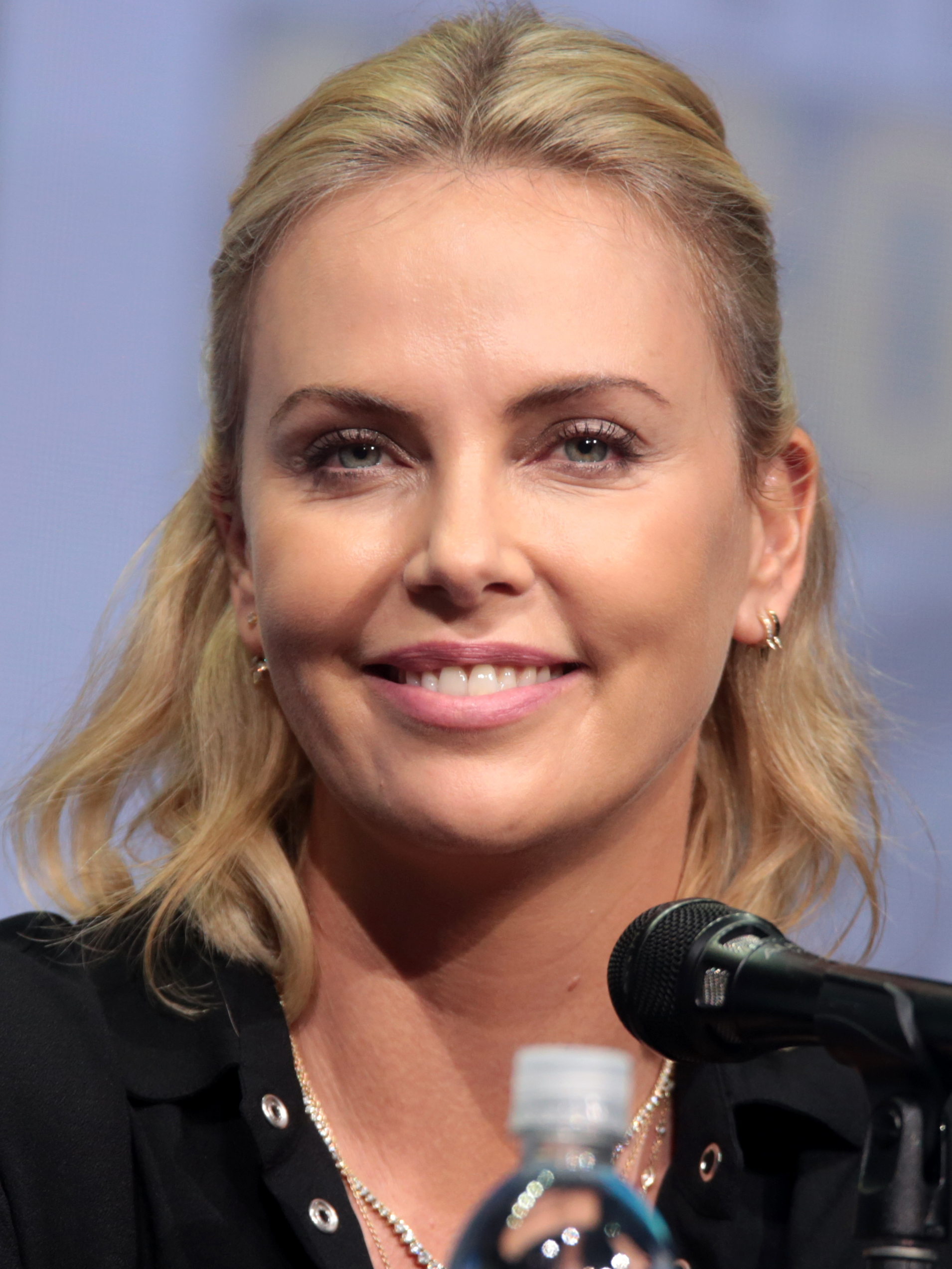
Theron at the 2017 San Diego Comic-Con

In 2017, Theron starred in The Fate of the Furious as the cyberterrorist Cipher, the main antagonist of the entire franchise, and played a spy on the eve of the collapse of the Berlin Wall in 1989 in Atomic Blonde, an adaptation of the graphic novel The Coldest City, directed by David Leitch. The Fate of The Furious had a worldwide gross of US$1.2 billion. and Atomic Blonde was described by Richard Roeper of the Chicago Sun-Times as "a slick vehicle for the magnetic, badass charms of Charlize Theron, who is now officially an A-list action star on the strength of this film and Mad Max: Fury Road". In the black comedy Tully (2018), directed by Jason Reitman and written by Diablo Cody, Theron played an overwhelmed mother of three. The film was acclaimed by critics, who concluded it "delves into the modern parenthood experience with an admirably deft blend of humor and raw honesty, brought to life by an outstanding performance by Charlize Theron". She played the president of a pharmaceutical corporation in the crime film Gringo and produced the biographical war drama film A Private War, both released in 2018.

In 2019, Theron produced and starred in the romantic comedy film Long Shot, opposite Seth Rogen and directed by Jonathan Levine, portraying a U.S. Secretary of State who reconnects with a journalist she used to babysit. The film had its world premiere at South by Southwest in March, and was released on 3 May to positive reviews from film critics. Theron next starred as Megyn Kelly in the drama Bombshell, which she co-produced. Directed by Jay Roach, the film revolves around the sexual harassment allegations made against Fox News CEO Roger Ailes by former female employees. For her work in the film, Theron was nominated for an Academy Award for Best Actress, Golden Globe Award for Best Actress in a Motion Picture – Drama, Critics' Choice Movie Award for Best Actress, Actor Award for Outstanding Performance by a Female Actor in a Leading Role, and BAFTA Award for Best Actress in a Leading Role. That year, Forbes ranked her as the ninth highest-paid actress in the world, with an annual income of $23 million.

=== 2020–present: Continued success ===
In 2020, she produced and starred opposite KiKi Layne in the superhero film The Old Guard, directed by Gina Prince-Bythewood. The following year, she reprised her role as Cipher in F9, originally set for release on 22 May 2020, before its delay to June 2021 due to the COVID-19 pandemic.

In 2022, Theron appeared in several projects. Upon the film's release in May, it was revealed that Theron would portray the character Clea in the Marvel Cinematic Universe (MCU), beginning with her debut in the mid-credits scene of the superhero film Doctor Strange in the Multiverse of Madness. She played Lady Lesso in the fantasy Netflix film The School for Good and Evil and filmed a cameo in the third season opener of The Boys as an actress playing Stormfront.

In 2023, Theron reprised her role as Cipher in Fast X and executive produced the HBO documentary series Last Call: When a Serial Killer Stalked Queer New York about a serial killer preying on gay men. In 2024, she was cast in Christopher Nolan's The Odyssey (2026) as the goddess Calypso.

== Influences and process ==
Theron is inspired by actresses Susan Sarandon and Sigourney Weaver. She has described her admiration for Tom Hanks as a "love affair" and watched many of his films throughout her youth. Hollywood actors were not featured in magazines in South Africa so she did not know how famous he was until she moved to the United States, which has been inferred as a factor of her "down-to-earth" attitude to fame. After filming for That Thing You Do! finished, Theron got Hanks' autograph on her script. She later presented him his Cecil B. DeMille Award in 2020, in which Hanks revealed that he had a mutual admiration for Theron's career since the day he met her.

In 2019, Theron spoke about her method of working on roles. Creating a physical identity together with the emotional part of the character, she said, is "a great tool set that adds on to everything else you were already doing as an actor. It's a case-by-case thing, but there is, to me, this beautiful thing that happens when you can get both sides: the exterior and interior. It's a really powerful dynamic". When preparing for a role, "I almost treat it like studying. I will find space where I am alone, where I can be focused, where there's nobody in my house, and I can really just sit down and study and play and look at my face and hear my voice and walk around and be a fucking idiot and my dogs are the only ones who are seeing that".

== Other ventures ==
=== Activism ===
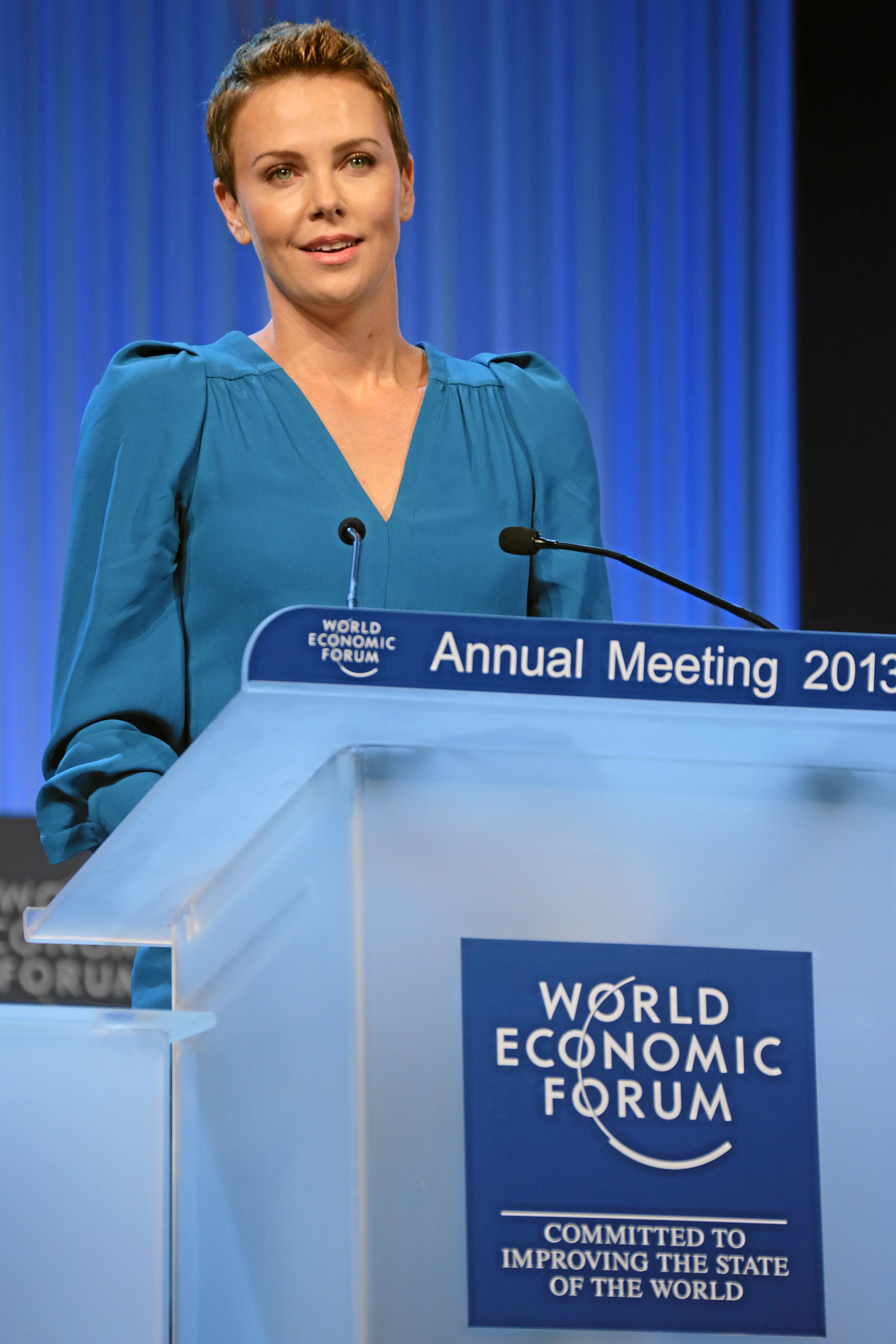
Theron speaking at a meeting of the World Economic Forum in 2013

The Charlize Theron Africa Outreach Project (CTAOP) was created in 2007 by Theron, in an effort to support African youth in the fight against HIV/AIDS. By November 2017, CTAOP had raised more than $6.3 million to support African organizations working on the ground.

In 2008, Theron was named a United Nations Messenger of Peace. In his citation, Ban Ki-moon said of Theron: "You have consistently dedicated yourself to improving the lives of women and children in South Africa, and to preventing and stopping violence against women and girls." She recorded a public service announcement in 2014 as part of the UN's "Stop Rape Now" program.

In December 2009, CTAOP and Toms Shoes partnered to create a limited edition unisex shoe. The shoe was made from vegan materials and inspired by the African baobab tree, the silhouette of which was embroidered on blue and orange canvas. Ten thousand pairs were given to destitute children, and a portion of the proceeds went to CTAOP.

In 2020, CTAOP partnered with Parfums Christian Dior to create Dior Stands With Women, an initiative that includes Cara Delevingne, Yalitza Aparicio, Paloma Elsesser, and others, to encourage women to be assertive by documenting their journey, challenges and accomplishments.

Theron is involved in women's rights organizations and has marched in pro-choice rallies.

Theron is a supporter of same-sex marriage and attended a march and rally to support that in Fresno, California, on 30 May 2009. She publicly stated that she refused to get married until same-sex marriage became legal in the United States, saying:

I don't want to get married because right now the institution of marriage feels very one-sided, and I want to live in a country where we all have equal rights. I think it would be exactly the same if we were married, but for me to go through that kind of ceremony, because I have so many friends who are gays and lesbians who would so badly want to get married, that I wouldn't be able to sleep with myself....

Theron further elaborated on her stance in a June 2011 interview on Piers Morgan Tonight. She stated: "I do have a problem with the fact that our government hasn't stepped up enough to make this federal, to make [gay marriage] legal. I think everybody has that right".

In March 2014, CTAOP was among the charities that benefited from the annual Fame and Philanthropy fundraising event on the night of the 86th Academy Awards. Theron was an honoured guest along with Halle Berry and keynote speaker James Cameron.

In 2015, Theron signed an open letter which One Campaign had been collecting signatures for; the letter was addressed to Angela Merkel and Nkosazana Dlamini-Zuma, urging them to focus on women as they serve as the head of the G7 in Germany and the AU in South Africa respectively, which will start to set the priorities in development funding before a main UN summit in September 2015 that will establish new development goals for the generation. In August 2017, she visited South Africa with Trevor Noah and made a donation to the South African charity Life Choices. In 2018, she gave a speech about AIDS prevention at the 22nd International AIDS Conference in Amsterdam, organized by the International AIDS Society. In June 2019, Theron participated in the LA Pride in West Hollywood, California, marching in support of LGBTQ+ rights during Pride Month.

On 22 June 2022, it was announced that Theron and Sheryl Lee Ralph would receive the Elizabeth Taylor Commitment to End AIDS Award for their commitment to raising awareness of HIV at the Elizabeth Taylor Ball to End AIDS fundraising gala. She participated in the 2026 Winter Olympics opening ceremony, held at San Siro stadium in Milan, where she delivered a message of peace and unity, speaking against war and emphasizing harmony and global solidarity.

=== Endorsements ===
Having signed a deal with John Galliano in 2004, Theron replaced Estonian model Tiiu Kuik as the spokeswoman in the J'Adore advertisements by Christian Dior. In June 2024, Dior announced Theron would no longer be the face of J'Adore and would be replaced by Barbadian singer and businesswoman Rihanna. From October 2005 to December 2006, Theron earned US$3 million for the use of her image in a worldwide print media advertising campaign for Raymond Weil watches. In February 2006, she and her production company were sued by Weil for breach of contract. The lawsuit was settled on 4 November 2008. In 2018, Theron joined Brad Pitt, Daniel Wu and Adam Driver as brand ambassadors for Breitling, dubbed the Breitling Cinema Squad.

== Personal life ==
In 2007, Theron became a naturalised citizen of the United States, while retaining her South African citizenship.

Theron adopted two young daughters. She has been interested in adoption since childhood, when she became aware of orphanages and the overflowing numbers of children in them. In April 2019, Theron revealed that one of her daughters, then seven years old, is a transgender girl. She said of her daughters, "They were born who they are and exactly where in the world both of them get to find themselves as they grow up, and who they want to be, is not for me to decide".

Theron said in 2018 that she went to therapy in her thirties because of anger, discovering that it was due to her frustration growing up during South Africa's apartheid, which ended when she was 15.

Theron is a longtime fan of the English band Depeche Mode and was the presenter for their Rock and Roll Hall of Fame induction in 2020.

=== Relationships ===
Theron's first public relationship was with actor Craig Bierko, whom she dated from 1995 to 1997.

Theron was in a three-year relationship with singer Stephan Jenkins until October 2001. Some of Third Eye Blind's third album, Out of the Vein, explores the emotions Jenkins experienced as a result of their breakup.

Theron was in a relationship with Irish actor Stuart Townsend from 2001 to 2009 after meeting him on the set of Trapped. The couple lived together in Los Angeles and Ireland.

In December 2013, Theron began dating American actor Sean Penn. The relationship ended in June 2015. There were reports they were engaged, which Theron strongly denied, adding that the relationship had ended before it ever became serious. Theron starred in Penn's film The Last Face (2016), which they filmed while still a couple.

In July 2017, Theron revealed that she had had same-sex experiences when she was younger, describing them as part of exploring her sexuality during her youth, but added that she was ultimately attracted primarily to men. In July 2025, she disclosed that she had recently had a one-night stand with a 26-year-old man, saying that the experience had given her a greater sense of freedom in her forties and reaffirming her preference for remaining single while dating casually. In April 2026, Theron said that she did not think she would ever want to live with a romantic partner again, explaining that she had grown accustomed to her independence as a single mother and was focused on her family.

=== Health concerns ===
During her first modeling job in Morocco at age 16, Theron recalled being thrown from a camel during a photo shoot after the animal became unruly, striking her in the face and dislocating her jaw. Theron often quips that she has more injuries on sets that are not action films; however, while filming Æon Flux in Berlin, Theron suffered a herniated disc in her neck, caused by a fall while filming a series of back handsprings. It required her to wear a neck brace for a month. Her thumb ligament tore during filming of The Old Guard when her thumb caught in another actor's jacket during a fight scene, which required three operations and six months in a thumb brace. During the filming of Atomic Blonde she broke teeth from clenching her jaw, and had dental surgery to remove them: "I had the removal and I had to put a donor bone in there to heal until I came back, and then I had another surgery to put a metal screw in there."

Outside of action films, she had a herniated disk in her lower back as she filmed Tully and suffered from a depression-like state, which she theorized was the result of the processed food she had to eat for her character's post-natal body. In July 2009, she was diagnosed with a serious stomach virus, thought to be contracted while overseas. While filming The Road, Theron injured her vocal cords while screaming during the labour scenes. When promoting Long Shot, she revealed that she laughed so hard at Borat that her neck locked for five days. She added that on the set of Long Shot she "ended up in the ER" after knocking her head against a bench behind her when she was putting on knee pads.

== See also ==
- List of African Academy Award winners and nominees
- List of Golden Globe winners
