= Monster (2003 film) =

2003 film by Patty Jenkins

- Theatrical release poster
- Directed by: Patty Jenkins
- Written by: Patty Jenkins
- Produced by: Donald Kushner; Brad Wyman; Charlize Theron; Mark Damon; Clark Peterson
- Starring: Charlize Theron; Christina Ricci; Bruce Dern; Lee Tergesen
- Cinematography: Steven Bernstein
- Edited by: Arthur Coburn; Jane Kurson
- Music by: BT
- Production companies: Media 8 Entertainment; DEJ Productions; Denver & Delilah Films; VIP Medienfonds; K/W Productions
- Distributed by: Newmarket Films (North America); DEJ Productions (overseas)
- Release dates: November 16, 2003 (AFI Fest); December 24, 2003 (United States)
- Running time: 109 minutes
- Country: United States
- Language: English
- Budget: $1.5 million
- Box office: $64.2 million

Monster is a 2003 American crime drama film written and directed by Patty Jenkins in her feature directorial debut. The biographical film follows serial killer Aileen Wuornos, a prostitute who murdered seven of her male clients between 1989 and 1990 and was executed in Florida in 2002. It stars Charlize Theron as Wuornos and Christina Ricci as her semi-fictionalized lover, Selby Wall (based on Wuornos's real-life girlfriend, Tyria Moore).

Monster had its world premiere at the AFI Fest on November 16, 2003. On February 8, 2004, it premiered at the 54th Berlin International Film Festival, where it competed for the Golden Bear, while Theron won the Silver Bear for Best Actress. The film was theatrically released in the United States on December 24, 2003, by Newmarket Films. Monster received positive reviews from critics and achieved box office success, grossing $64.2 million on a $1.5 million budget.

The film received numerous awards and nominations, particularly for Theron's performance, including the Academy Award for Best Actress, the Golden Globe Award for Best Actress in a Drama, the SAG Award for Outstanding Lead Actress, the Critics' Choice Movie Award for Best Actress, the Independent Spirit Award for Best Female Lead, and also the Independent Spirit Award for Best First Feature (Patty Jenkins). Theron's acting has received critical acclaim; film critic Roger Ebert called Theron's role "one of the greatest performances in the history of the cinema". The film was chosen by the American Film Institute as one of the top ten films of 2003.

== Plot ==
In 1989, after moving from Michigan to Daytona Beach, Florida, and on the verge of taking her own life, street prostitute Aileen "Lee" Wuornos meets a young woman, Selby Wall, in a gay bar. Although Aileen is initially hostile and states that she is not a lesbian, she talks to Selby while drinking beer. Selby takes to Aileen almost immediately and invites her to spend the night with her. The two women return to the house where Selby is staying after being temporarily exiled by her religious parents following an accusation from another girl that Selby tried to kiss her. They later agree to meet at a roller skating rink, and they kiss for the first time. Aileen and Selby fall in love and agree to meet for another date the following evening.

Aileen begins prostituting the following day to make money to take Selby on the date. Towards the end of the day, she is approached by a client, Vincent Corey, who drives them to a wooded area. Aileen becomes uncomfortable by Vincent's bizarre demeanor and avowed hatred for prostitutes. As the two begin arguing, Vincent knocks Aileen unconscious. Meanwhile, Selby waits for Aileen but leaves after she does not show up. Aileen regains consciousness and finds herself tied to the steering wheel, as Vincent brutally rapes and beats her. Aileen manages to free her hands and shoot him to death with a gun from her purse. She disposes of his body, steals his car and decides to quit prostitution. Later that night, she visits Selby at the house and asks her to run away with her. Selby agrees after Aileen confesses her love and promises to support her. The two rent a motel room and try to start a life together. Aileen decides to find qualified work, but because of her lack of education and work experience, she is rejected by potential employers. Desperate to keep herself and Selby financially afloat, Aileen returns to prostitution. She kills her clients and steals their money and cars, each killed in a more brutal way than the last, as she is convinced that they are all rapists and predators. She spares one man out of pity when he admits he has never had sex with a prostitute. While driving one of the stolen cars, Selby crashes into the front yard of a house. The homeowners attempt to call the police, but Aileen manages to drive the car away and dispose of it.

Selby confronts Aileen about the owner of the car, and Aileen confesses to the murders but justifies her actions by claiming she had only been protecting herself. As money runs out, Aileen tries to find another client. She is picked up by a man who genuinely offers her shelter and assistance. Despite her hesitancy, Aileen kills him. Selby sees composite sketches of her and Aileen on the news and returns to Ohio on a charter bus. Aileen is approached at the biker bar she frequents by two men, who unbeknownst to her, are undercover police officers. Thomas, whom Aileen always referred to as the only friend she had, infers the men's intentions and offers to spirit her away from the bar. Aileen misinterprets his offer as soliciting her for services and declines in disgust. The two men eventually lure Aileen out of the bar, and she is arrested by the police. Aileen speaks to Selby one last time while in jail. Selby, through tears, expresses fear of her own fate and culpability, and the viewer learns that she is cooperating with police who are coaching her through eliciting incriminating statements from Aileen. The ploy works, and Aileen admits on the recording that she murdered the men alone, without Selby's involvement, likely despite realizing that she was being recorded and that Selby was betraying her. During Aileen's trial, Selby coldly testifies against her, and she is devastated but understanding. Aileen is convicted of the murders and sentenced to death. On October 9, 2002, Aileen is executed by lethal injection.

== Cast ==
- Charlize Theron as Aileen "Lee" Wuornos
- Christina Ricci as Selby Wall (based on Tyria Moore)
- Bruce Dern as Thomas, Aileen's friend
- Lee Tergesen as Vincent Corey (based on Richard Mallory)
- Annie Corley as Donna, Selby's aunt
- Pruitt Taylor Vince as Gene/Stuttering "john"
- Marco St. John as Evan/Former policeman "john"
- Marc Macaulay as Will/"Daddy" "john"
- Scott Wilson as Horton/Last victim
- Rus Blackwell as the policeman who stopped Aileen
- Tim Ware as Chuck, Aileen's client

== Reception ==
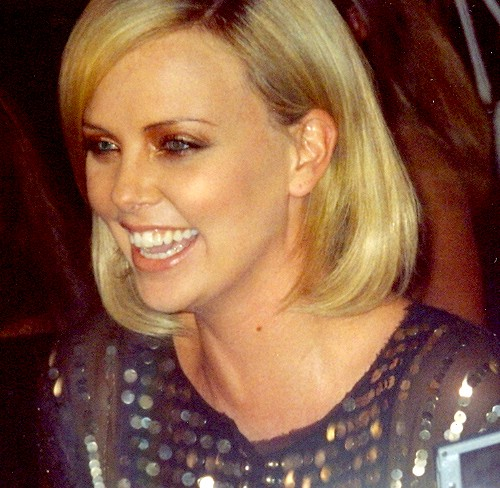
Charlize Theron received ubiquitous amount of praise and won the Academy Award for Best Actress for her portrayal of Aileen Wuornos.

=== Critical response ===
On review aggregator website Rotten Tomatoes, the film has a rating of 81%, based on 191 reviews, with an average rating of 7.3/10. The site's critical consensus states: "Charlize Theron gives a searing, deglamorized performance as real life serial killer Aileen Wuornos in Monster, an intense, disquieting portrait of a profoundly damaged soul." On Metacritic, the film has a score of 74 out of 100, based on 40 reviews, indicating "generally favorable reviews".

Monster received highly positive reviews from critics; most gave overwhelmingly high praise to Theron's performance as a mentally unstable woman – Wuornos had antisocial personality disorder and borderline personality disorder. For the role, Theron gained 30 pounds (14 kg), shaved her eyebrows, and wore prosthetic teeth. Critics called her performance, and her makeup, a "transformation". Film critic Roger Ebert named Monster "the best film of the year", gave it four stars out of four, and noted that Theron's role is "one of the greatest performances in the history of the cinema":

Observe the way Theron controls her eyes in the film; there is not a flicker of inattention, as she urgently communicates what she is feeling and thinking [...] Aileen's body language is frightening and fascinating. She doesn't know how to occupy her body. Watch Theron as she goes through a repertory of little arm straightenings and body adjustments and head tosses and hair touchings, as she nervously tries to shake out her nervousness and look at ease. Observe her smoking technique; she handles her cigarettes with the self-conscious bravado of a 13-year-old trying to impress a kid. And note that there is only one moment in the movie where she seems relaxed and at peace with herself.

— Roger Ebert; January 1, 2004

In 2009, Ebert named it the third-best film of the decade. Ricci's performance also drew some praise, but was not without criticism. In his review for the film, Ebert praised her performance, stating "Christina Ricci finds the right note for Selby Wall – so correct some critics have mistaken it for bad acting, when in fact it is sublime acting in its portrayal of a bad actor. She plays Selby as clueless, dim, in over her head, picking up cues from moment to moment, cobbling her behavior out of notions borrowed from bad movies, old songs, and barroom romances". In 2025, it was one of the films voted for the "Readers' Choice" edition of The New York Times' list of "The 100 Best Movies of the 21st Century," finishing at number 195.

However, several people who knew Wuornos criticized the movie for portraying her as a victim and her victims as villains.

=== In culture ===
In 2005, a reference to Monster appeared in the series Arrested Development. Charlize Theron plays the role of Rita in the series, and in the episode ″The Ocean Walker″, a frame from Monster appears on the screen with the clarification that this is a photo of Rita a year ago before the plastic surgery.

In 2014, on Saturday Night Live, Charlize Theron made a self-reference to her role of Aileen Wuornos. In the sketch Pet Rescue Commercial, Kate McKinnon asked her to play a cat lady, whose image and behavior are based on Wuornos from Monster.

In 2018, comedian Willam released his third album with the song "Aileen" and the music video for the song, which are dedicated to Wuornos and this film.

== Music ==
=== Soundtrack ===
Monster

Soundtrack album by BT
- Released: January 30, 2004
- Label: dts Entertainment

In 2004, BT released an official soundtrack to the film. Included with the release is a DVD featuring all fifteen original cues, and an additional nine cues that would not fit on the CD, as well as an interview with BT and Patty Jenkins, and remix files for "Ferris Wheel".

All music is composed by BT.

- 1. "Childhood Montage"
- 2. "Girls Kiss"
- 3. "The Bus Stop"
- 4. "Turning Tricks"
- 5. "First Kill"
- 6. "Job Hunt"
- 7. "Bad Cop"
- 8. "'Call Me Daddy' Killing"
- 9. "I Don't Like It Rough"
- 10. "Ferris Wheel (Love Theme)"
- 11. "Ditch the Car"
- 12. "Madman Speech"
- 13. "Cop Killing"
- 14. "News on TV"
- 15. "Courtroom"

=== Songs ===
Songs which appeared in the film, but not on the official soundtrack:

- "Don't Stop Believin'" – Journey
- "Where Do I Begin" – The Chemical Brothers
- "Crimson and Clover" – Tommy James & The Shondells
- "All She Wants Is" – Duran Duran
- "Space Age Love Song" – A Flock of Seagulls
- "Shake Your Groove Thing" – Peaches & Herb
- "Tide Is High" – Blondie
- "What You Need" – INXS
- "Sugar and Spice" – The Searchers
- "Secret Crush on You" – Pete Surdoval, Al Gross
- "Flirtin' With Disaster" – Molly Hatchet
- "Keep On Loving You" – REO Speedwagon
- "Crazy Girl" – Molly Pasutti
- "Do You Wanna Touch Me (Oh Yeah)" – Joan Jett & The Blackhearts
- "A Road Runner: Road Runner's 'G' Jam" – Humble Pie
- "Sweet Peace and Time" – Humble Pie

== Accolades ==
Year	Award/Festival	Category	Recipient	Result
2004	Academy Awards	Best Actress	Charlize Theron	Won
2004	Golden Globe Awards	Best Actress in a Motion Picture – Drama	Charlize Theron	Won
2005	BAFTA Awards	Best Actress in a Leading Role	Charlize Theron	Nominated
2004	Screen Actors Guild Awards	Outstanding Performance by a Female Actor in a Leading Role	Charlize Theron	Won
2004	American Film Institute Awards	Top Ten Films of the Year	Monster	Won
2003	Awards Circuit Community Awards	Best Actress in a Leading Role	Charlize Theron	Won
2012	Awards Circuit Community Awards	Best Actress of the Decade	Charlize Theron	Won
2004	Berlin International Film Festival	Golden Bear	Patty Jenkins	Nominated
2004	Berlin International Film Festival	Silver Bear for Best Actress	Charlize Theron	Won
2004	Casting Society of America	Best Casting for Feature Film, Independent	Ferne Cassel, Kimberly Mullen	Won
2004	Central Ohio Film Critics Association	Best Actress	Charlize Theron	Won
2004	Chicago Film Critics Association Awards	Best Actress	Charlize Theron	Won
2004	Critics' Choice Movie Awards	Best Actress	Charlize Theron	Won
2004	Dallas–Fort Worth Film Critics Association Awards	Best Actress	Charlize Theron	Won
2004	Edgar Allan Poe Awards	Best Motion Picture Screenplay	Patty Jenkins	Nominated
2005	GLAAD Media Awards	Outstanding Film – Wide Release	Patty Jenkins	Nominated
2004	Gold Derby Awards	Lead Actress	Charlize Theron	Won
2010	Gold Derby Awards	Lead Actress of the Decade	Charlize Theron	Won
2003	Golden Schmoes Awards	Best Actress of the Year	Charlize Theron	Won
2004	Golden Trailer Awards	Best Voice Over	Monster	Nominated
2004	Independent Spirit Awards	Best First Feature	Patty Jenkins	Won
2004	Independent Spirit Awards	Best First Screenplay	Patty Jenkins	Nominated
2004	Independent Spirit Awards	Best Female Lead	Charlize Theron	Won
2004	International Cinephile Society Awards	Best Actress	Charlize Theron	Nominated
2004	International Horror Guild Awards	Best Movie	Patty Jenkins	Nominated
2004	International Online Cinema Awards	Best Actress	Charlize Theron	Nominated
2004	International Online Cinema Awards	Best Makeup and Hairstyling	Monster	Nominated
2004	Iowa Film Critics Awards	Best Movie Yet to Open in Iowa	Patty Jenkins	Won
2004	Irish Film and Television Awards	Best International Actress	Charlize Theron	Nominated
2005	Italian Online Movie Awards	Best Actress	Charlize Theron	Nominated
2005	Italian Online Movie Awards	Best Makeup	Monster	Nominated
2004	Las Vegas Film Critics Society Awards	Best Actress	Charlize Theron	Won
2004	Las Vegas Film Critics Society Awards	Best Screenplay	Patty Jenkins	Nominated
2004	Las Vegas Film Critics Society Awards	Best Supporting Actress	Christina Ricci	Nominated
2005	London Film Critics Circle Awards	Actress of the Year	Charlize Theron	Nominated
2004	Los Angeles Film Critics Association Awards	Best Actress	Charlize Theron	Nominated
2004	MTV Movie Awards	Best Female Performance	Charlize Theron	Nominated
2004	MTV Movie Awards	Best Kiss	Charlize Theron and Christina Ricci	Nominated
2003	National Board of Review Awards	Breakthrough Performance by an Actress	Charlize Theron	Won
2004	National Society of Film Critics Awards	Best Actress	Charlize Theron	Won
2003	New York Film Critics Circle Awards	Best Actress	Charlize Theron	Nominated
2003	New York Film Critics Online Awards	Best Actress	Charlize Theron	Won
2004	Online Film & Television Association	Best Actress	Charlize Theron	Won
2004	Online Film & Television Association	Best Makeup and Hairstyling	Monster	Nominated
2004	Online Film Critics Society Awards	Best Actress	Charlize Theron	Nominated
2005	Robert Awards	Best American Film	Patty Jenkins	Nominated
2003	San Francisco Film Critics Circle Awards	Best Actress	Charlize Theron	Won
2004	Santa Barbara International Film Festival	Outstanding Performer of the Year	Charlize Theron	Won
2004	Satellite Awards	Best Actress – Motion Picture Drama	Charlize Theron	Won
2003	Seattle Film Critics Awards	Best Actress	Charlize Theron	Nominated
2003	Utah Film Critics Association Awards	Best Actress	Charlize Theron	Won
2004	Vancouver Film Critics Circle Awards	Best Actress	Charlize Theron	Won
2003	Village Voice Film Poll	Best Performance	Charlize Theron	Nominated

== See also ==
- List of lesbian, gay, bisexual, or transgender-related films by storyline
