= Rukeyser =

Rukeyser is a surname. Notable people with the surname include:

- Louis Rukeyser (1933-2006), American financial journalist
- Merryle Rukeyser (1897–1988), was an American journalist and educator
- Muriel Rukeyser (1913-1980), American poet and political activist
- Stacy Rukeyser (born 1970), American television writer and producer
- William S. Rukeyser (born 1939), American journalist
