= Clark Peterson =

American film producer (born 1966)

- Born: February 7, 1966 (age 60)
- Occupations: Film producer, entertainment executive
- Notable work: Monster
- Spouse: Stacy Rukeyser (m. 2010)

Clark Peterson (born February 7, 1966) is an American film producer and entertainment executive. He produced the Academy Award-winning film Monster, starring Charlize Theron, and has created and produced a wide variety of award-winning films, documentaries, and television movies. He is also a member of the Academy of Motion Picture Arts and Sciences.

== Life and career ==
A graduate of Stanford University, Peterson began his career working in script development and film production for producer Roger Corman before later joining Walt Disney Studios as an executive and going on to serve as a senior executive at several independent film companies. Peterson continues to develop and produce as a Partner and Managing Director of Remstar Studios, a production company and fund based in Los Angeles and Montreal.

In recent years, Peterson produced the critically acclaimed and Annie award-nominated Kahlil Gibran's The Prophet directed by Roger Allers and featuring the voices of Liam Neeson and Salma Hayek-Pinault. He produced writer/director Robert Jury's 2019 debut film Working Man, which stars Peter Gerety, Billy Brown, and Academy Award nominee Talia Shire. Richard Roeper of the Chicago Sun-Times noted the film contained "Some of the most powerful acting I've seen in any movie this year," and Pete Hammond of Deadline said the film "defines what smart independent moviemaking is all about." He produced the 2018's comedy Ideal Home, written and directed by Andrew Fleming, and starring Paul Rudd and Steve Coogan, and executive produced the science fiction thriller Replicas, starring Keanu Reeves and Alice Eve. Other projects include Rampart directed by Oren Moverman from a screenplay by James Ellroy and starring Woody Harrelson, Devil's Knot, directed by Atom Egoyan and starring Colin Firth and Reese Witherspoon, and Decoding Annie Parker, starring Helen Hunt, Samantha Morton, and Aaron Paul. Earlier projects include My Date with Drew, Dim Sum Funeral, and East of Havana, a documentary about the Cuban hip-hop scene.

In television, he has developed a number of television series and pilots, and was named to Deadline Hollywood's list of "Overachievers" for the 2015 television pilot season. Additionally, Peterson recently authored a guest column for the Hollywood Reporter entitled "Why Patty Jenkins' Wonder Woman Success Shouldn't Be Surprising", based on his experiences producing Monster, which was Jenkins' first film.

=== Personal life ===
In 2010, he married Stacy Rukeyser in Los Angeles. Rukeyser is a television writer and current showrunner of UnReal on Lifetime and Hulu networks and is the daughter of Louis Rukeyser, the former host of Wall Street Week. They have two children.

== Filmography ==
- Neighborhood Watch (2025): executive producer
- Working Man (2019): producer
- Replicas (2018): executive producer
- Ideal Home (2018): producer
- The Prophet (2014): producer
- Devil's Knot (2013): producer
- Decoding Annie Parker (2013): producer
- Rampart (2011): producer
- Dear Mr. Gacy (2010): producer
- Dim Sum Funeral (2008): executive producer
- Behind the Smile (2006): producer
- East of Havana (2006): producer
- My Date with Drew (2004): executive producer
- Monster (2003): producer
- Risk (2003): executive producer
- Tart (2001): executive producer
- The Watcher (2000): co-producer
- A Table for One (1999): producer
- The Landlady (1998): co-producer
- The Killing Grounds (1998): co-producer
- The Night Caller (1998): co-producer
- Man of Her Dreams (1997): co-producer
- Wishmaster (1997): producer
- Stranger in the House (1997): executive producer
- Cupid (1997): producer
- The Nurse (1997): co-producer
- Daddy's Girl (1996): co-producer
- Dead Cold (1996): co-producer
- The Wrong Woman (1995): executive producer
- The Secretary (1995): co-producer
- Marked Man (1995): co-executive producer
