= Charlize Theron filmography =

Performances by South African and American actress

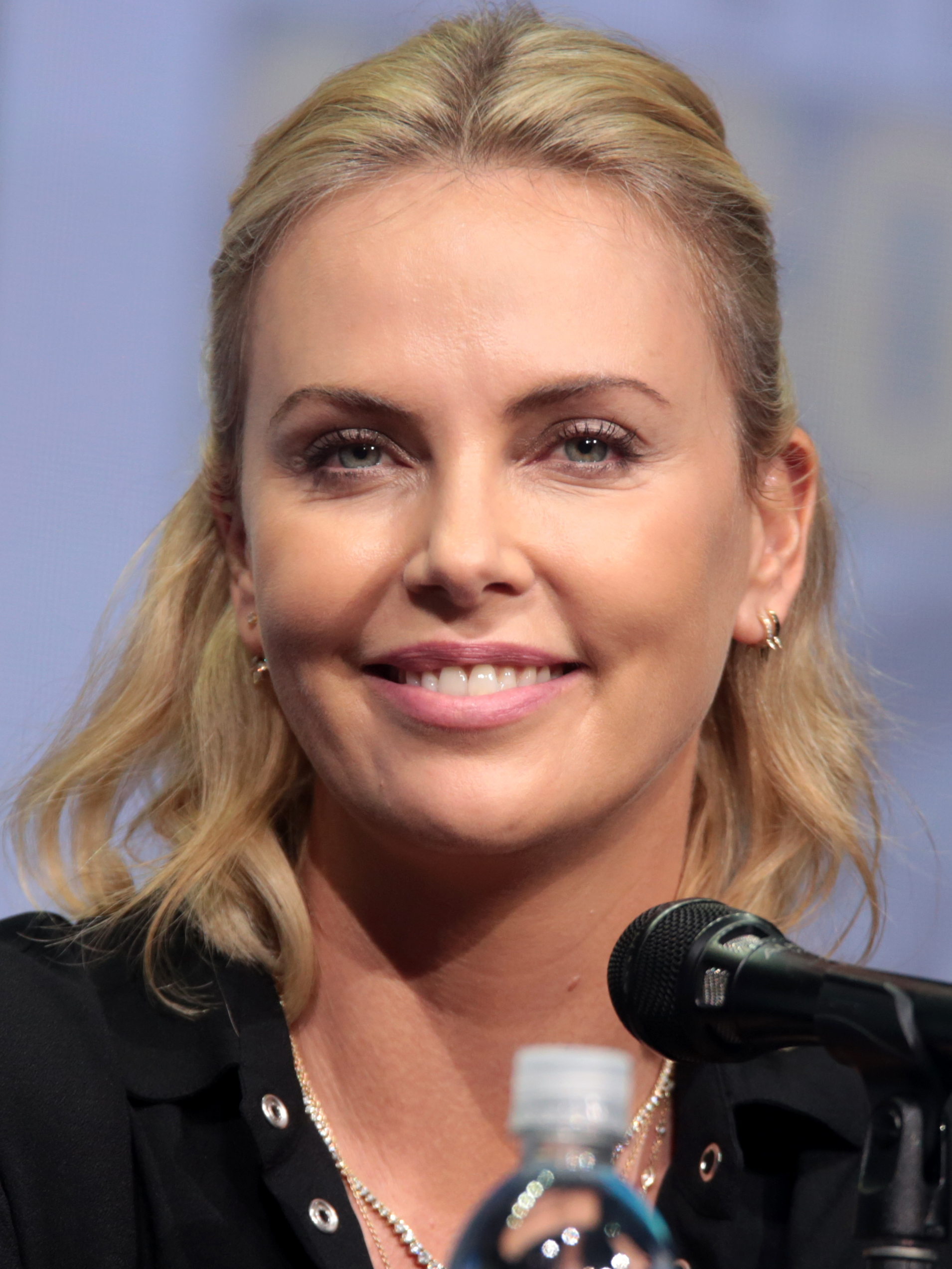
Theron at the 2017 San Diego Comic-Con

Charlize Theron is a South African and American actress and producer who made her film debut in an uncredited role as a follower of a cult in the 1995 horror film Children of the Corn III: Urban Harvest. Theron followed this with appearances as a hitman's girlfriend in 2 Days in the Valley, a waitress in the romantic comedy Trial and Error (1997), and a woman plagued with demonic visions in the mystery thriller The Devil's Advocate (1997) with Keanu Reeves and Al Pacino. She appeared in the science fiction thriller The Astronaut's Wife with Johnny Depp, and Lasse Hallström's The Cider House Rules (both in 1999). For her portrayal of serial killer Aileen Wuornos in the crime drama Monster (2003), Theron received the Academy Award for Best Actress, the Golden Globe Award for Best Actress in a Motion Picture – Drama, and the Screen Actors Guild Award for Outstanding Performance by a Female Actor in a Leading Role. The following year, she played Swedish entertainer Britt Ekland in the biographical film The Life and Death of Peter Sellers.

Theron played the eponymous rebel assassin in the science fiction action film Æon Flux, and a miner fighting sexual harassment in the drama North Country (both in 2005). The latter role earned her a nomination for Best Actress at the Academy Awards and the BAFTAs. In the same year, she voiced Æon Flux in the tie-in video game adaptation to the film for which she received the Best Performance by a Female award at the Spike Video Game Awards. Three years later, Theron starred in the superhero film Hancock with Will Smith. The film grossed over $624 million at the worldwide box office. She received a nomination for the Golden Globe Award for Best Actress – Motion Picture Comedy or Musical for her role as an alcoholic writer in the comedy-drama Young Adult (2011). The following year, Theron appeared in the action adventure film Snow White and the Huntsman and Ridley Scott's science fiction film Prometheus. In 2015, she played Imperator Furiosa in George Miller's Mad Max: Fury Road. Two years later, Theron appeared as criminal mastermind Cipher in the action film The Fate of the Furious (2017), a role she would reprise in F9 (2021), Fast X (2023), and Fast Forever (2028). Theron followed this with acclaimed performances in the comedy-drama Tully (2018), the romantic comedy Long Shot (2019), and the biographical drama Bombshell (2019), the lattermost of which earned her a third Academy Award nomination.

== Film ==
Year	Title	Role	Notes	Ref(s)
1995	Children of the Corn III: Urban Harvest	Eli's Follower	Uncredited; Direct-to-video	
1996	2 Days in the Valley	Helga Svelgen		
1996	That Thing You Do!	Tina Powers		
1997	Trial and Error	Billie Tyler		
1997	The Devil's Advocate	Mary Ann Lomax		
1998	Celebrity	Supermodel		
1998	Mighty Joe Young	Jill Young		
1999	The Astronaut's Wife	Jillian Armacost		
1999	The Cider House Rules	Candy Kendall		
2000	Reindeer Games	Ashley Mercer		
2000	The Yards	Erica Stoltz		
2000	Men of Honor	Gwen Sunday		
2000	The Legend of Bagger Vance	Adele Invergordon		
2001	Sweet November	Sara Deever		
2001	15 Minutes	Rose Hearn	Uncredited	
2001	The Curse of the Jade Scorpion	Laura Kensington		
2002	Trapped	Karen Jennings		
2002	Waking Up in Reno	Candy Kirkendall		
2003	The Italian Job	Stella Bridger		
2003	Monster	Aileen Wuornos	Also producer	
2004	Head in the Clouds	Gilda Bessé		
2005	North Country	Josey Aimes		
2005	Æon Flux	Æon Flux		
2007	In the Valley of Elah	Emily Sanders		
2007	Battle in Seattle	Ella		
2008	Sleepwalking	Joleen Reedy	Also producer	
2008	Hancock	Mary Embrey		
2008	The Burning Plain	Sylvia	Also executive producer	
2009	The Road	Wife		
2009	Astro Boy	Narrator	Voice	
2011	Young Adult	Mavis Gary		
2012	Snow White and the Huntsman	Queen Ravenna		
2012	Prometheus	Meredith Vickers		
2014	A Million Ways to Die in the West	Anna		
2015	Dark Places	Libby Day	Also producer	
2015	Mad Max: Fury Road	Imperator Furiosa		
2016	The Huntsman: Winter's War	Queen Ravenna		
2016	The Last Face	Wren Petersen		
2016	Kubo and the Two Strings	Sariatu / Monkey	Voice	
2017	Atomic Blonde	Lorraine Broughton	Also producer	
2017	The Fate of the Furious	Cipher		
2018	Tully	Marlo	Also producer	
2018	Gringo	Elaine Markinson	Also producer	
2019	Long Shot	Charlotte Field	Also producer	
2019	The Addams Family	Morticia Addams	Voice; also executive producer	
2019	Bombshell	Megyn Kelly	Also producer	
2020	The Old Guard	Andromache "Andy" of Scythia	Also producer	
2021	F9	Cipher		
2021	The Addams Family 2	Morticia Addams	Voice	
2022	Doctor Strange in the Multiverse of Madness	Clea	Cameo; post-credits scene	
2022	The School for Good and Evil	Lady Lesso		
2023	Fast X	Cipher		
2025	The Old Guard 2	Andromache "Andy" of Scythia	Also producer	
2026	Apex	Sasha	Also producer	
2026	The Odyssey	Calypso		
TBA	Tyrant †	TBA	Filming; Also producer	

Key
†	Denotes films that have not yet been released

== Television ==
Year	Title	Role(s)	Notes	Ref(s)
1997	Hollywood Confidential	Sally Bowen	Television film	
2000	Saturday Night Live	Host	Episode: "Charlize Theron / Paul Simon"	
2004	The Life and Death of Peter Sellers	Britt Ekland	Television film	
2005	Arrested Development	Rita Leeds	5 episodes	
2006	Robot Chicken	Daniel's Mom / Mother / Waitress	Voice; episode: "Book of Corrine"	
2014	Saturday Night Live	Host	Episode: "Charlize Theron / The Black Keys"	
2017	The Orville	Pria Lavesque	Episode: "Pria"	
2020	Home Movie: The Princess Bride	Fezzik	Episode: "Chapter Nine: Have Fun Storming the Castle!"	
2022	The Boys	Herself playing Stormfront	Cameo; episode: "Payback"	
2024	RuPaul's Drag Race	Guest Judge	Season 16; episode: "Rate-A-Queen"	
2025	The Studio	Herself	Episode: "The Promotion"; Cameo	

== Production credits ==
Year	Title	Work	Notes
Year	Title	Producer	Notes
2006	East of Havana	Yes	Documentary
2012	Hatfields & McCoys	Executive	Television pilot only
2016	Brain on Fire	Yes	Feature film
2017	Girlboss	Executive	13 episodes
2017–2019	Mindhunter	Executive	19 episodes
2018	A Private War	Yes	Feature film
2019	Murder Mystery	Executive	Feature film
2019	Hyperdrive	Executive	10 episodes
2023	Murder Mystery 2	Executive	Feature film
2023	Last Call: When a Serial Killer Stalked Queer New York	Executive	4 episodes
2024	Into the Fire: The Lost Daughter	Yes	2 episodes

== Music videos ==
Year	Title	Role	Artist	Ref(s)
2010	Crossfire	Heroine	Brandon Flowers	
2026	Love & Tears	—N/a	Gener8ion, Yannis Philippakis	

== Video games ==
Year	Title	Voice role	Ref(s)
2005	Æon Flux	Æon Flux	

== Web ==
Year	Title	Role	Ref(s)
2009	Between Two Ferns with Zach Galifianakis	Herself	
2012	Charlize Theron Got Hacked	Herself	
2017	10 Ways to Drive Him Wild (ft. Charlize Theron)	Herself	

== See also ==
- List of accolades received by Charlize Theron
