= Bernard Carter Randall =

B. Carter Randall
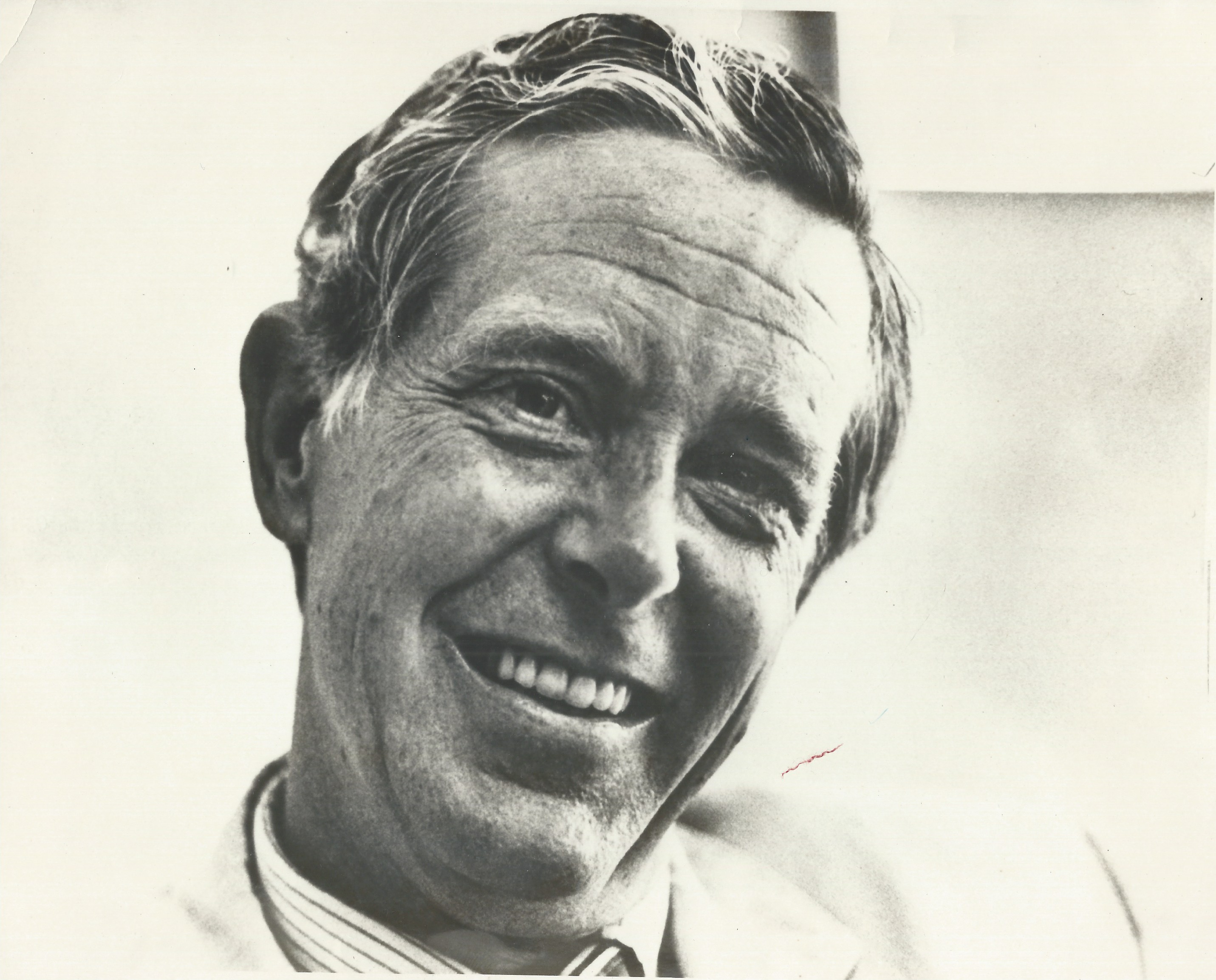
- Born: July 8, 1927; Baltimore, Maryland, United States
- Died: December 21, 1999 (aged 72); Orlando, Florida, U.S.
- Education: Gilman School, Harvard University, Johns Hopkins University
- Occupations: Banking executive, investment advisor, author, commentator
- Known for: Wall Street Week, career senior trust officer at several banks, financial commentator, newspaper columnist, teacher, author and radio personality
- Awards: Honorary Doctorate from Stetson University

Bernard Carter Randall (July 8, 1927 – December 21, 1999) was an American banking executive, investment advisor, author, and commentator notable for his appearance on Wall Street Week, his career in finance, and his contributions as a financial educator.

== Early life and family ==
B. Carter Randall was born in Baltimore, Maryland to Aurora (née Carter, a Life Master in Bridge) and Alexander Randall, a broker at Alex. Brown & Sons. He descended maternally from the Calvert family of Maryland and Henry "Light-Horse" Lee, and paternally from Alexander Randall, Maryland Attorney General 1864–68.

He was born at the beginning of the Great Depression and never forget its lessons. He wrote of people watering their gardens with silver pitchers because they did not have the funds to buy a hose, or "borrowing" a loaf of bread for the same reason. He learned at a very young age the devastating effect of borrowing against securities at a high value and losing all when the stock market fell.

His parents would routinely have him stand at the dinner table before dinner to give a short oral presentation, a practice that stood him in good stead when he joined the high school debating team and later went on to appear on television and radio.

He graduated from the Gilman School in 1944 and attended Harvard University (1944–45). He served in the U.S. Army Air Corps and Signal Corps from 1946 to 1947 and earned a degree from Johns Hopkins University in 1948.

== Career ==
Randall's banking career began with the Equitable Trust Company in Baltimore, where he worked from 1948 to 1977, rising from teller to Senior Vice President. In 1977, he became Senior Vice President at Royal Trust Bank of Miami, serving until 1981. He then worked for Sun Banks of Florida and later founded The Randall Company in Orlando.

=== Wall Street Week ===
Billed as B. Carter Randall, he appeared as a prime panelist on Wall Street Week from 1970 to 1996, beginning with the very first broadcast show. Soon, he would step in as temporary host on occasions when Louis Rukeyser was on vacation. In 1991, he and Frank Cappiello were both inducted into the Wall Street Week Hall of Fame.

He retired from Wall Street Week in 1996 due to his wife's illness, but continued on in his work at The Randall Company.

On May 9th, 2019, he was posthumously awarded a star in the Walk of Fame sidewalk at Maryland Public Television's Owings Mills studio.

=== Other Work ===
In 1992, he published Up on the Market, whose preface recounted the story of his arrival for auditions at Maryland Public Television, and whose main content addressed his views on economics and philosophy on investing. He also wrote columns for the Miami Herald, Orlando Sentinel Star, and other publications.

== Professional and community involvement ==
Randall was a life member and past president of the American Institute of Banking (Baltimore Chapter) and served on multiple boards in Maryland and Florida, including the Miami Opera Guild and Florida Philharmonic Orchestra.

He was a Member of the National Association of Securities Dealers Arbitration Committee.

Some of the other media contributions he made were on the Nightly Business Report (Miami local PBS), Money Matters and Carter Randall Report (both Orlando Channel 2), Carter Randall Report (WLOQ Radio, daily commentary), and as a weekly economy/investment columnist for the Miami Herald, Orlando Sentinel Star, Guia Del Comprador, and Florida Trend Magazine.

He also served as Governor of the Society of the Ark and the Dove from 1971 to 1976.

== Academic work and writings ==
Randall was an instructor at the University of Baltimore and visiting professor at Stetson University (which subsequently awarded him an honorary doctorate) and the University of Wisconsin Bank Administration Institute. His work includes lectures and articles on trust fund management, portfolio investment techniques, tax strategies, and economic outlooks.

== Personal life and death ==
He married Catherine Denison Frick in 1958 (divorced 1981), with whom he had two daughters. He later married Nancy Doan Pace in 1983, who died in 1996.

Randall had a keen interest in contract bridge and often organized private tournaments. He enjoyed playing tennis and golf and was fond of the Adirondacks. In 1973, he leased a camp in the High Peaks region, where he resided every summer until his death.

He died on December 21, 1999, in Orlando, Florida.
