= Nassau Weekly =

Princeton University student newspaper

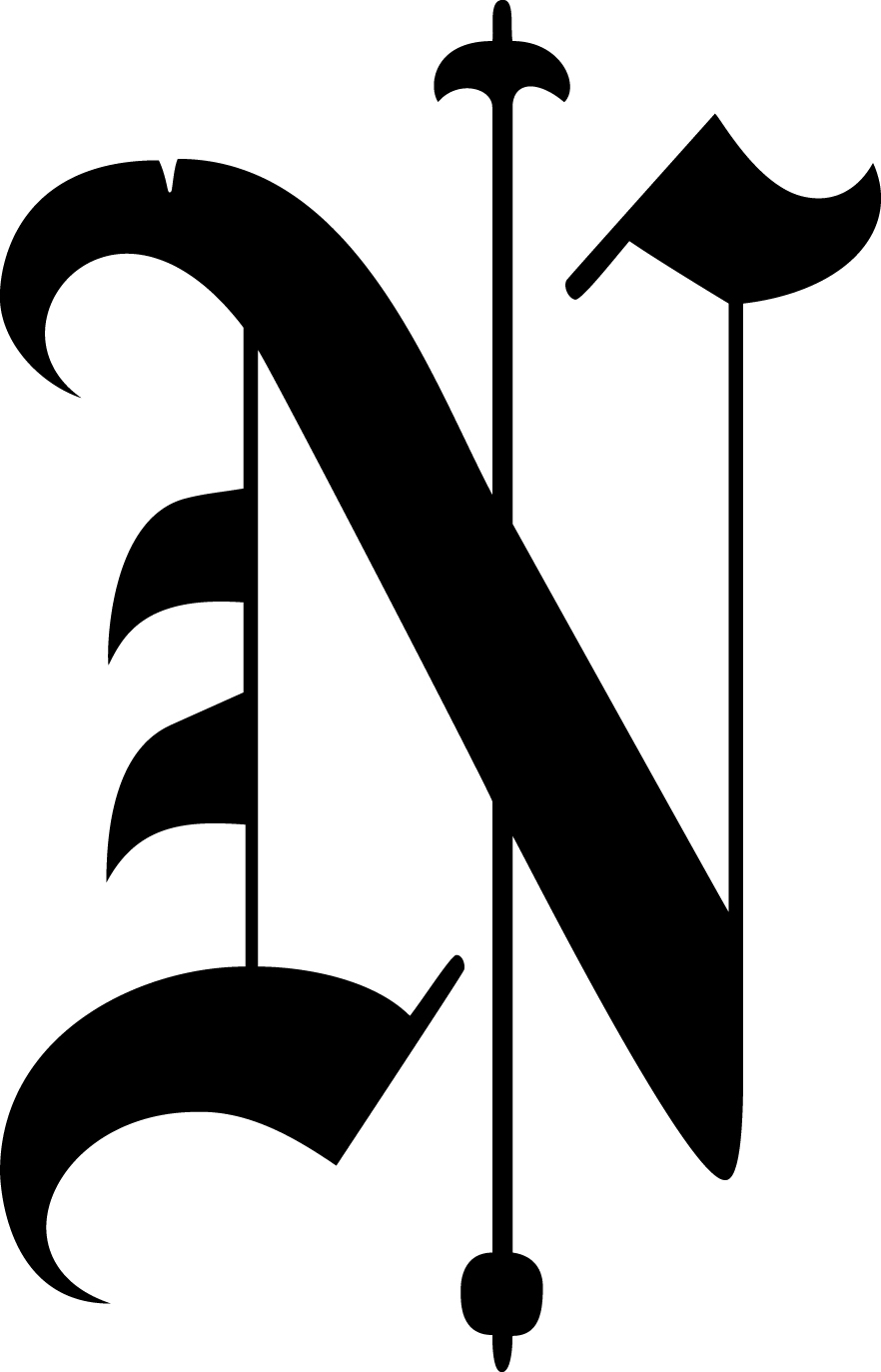
- Nassau Weekly Insignia
- Type: Weekly newspaper
- School: Princeton University
- Founded: 1979
- Headquarters: Princeton, New Jersey
- ISSN: 1075-5004
- Website: www.nassauweekly.com

Nassau Weekly is a weekly student newspaper of Princeton University. Published every Sunday, the paper contains a blend of campus, local, and national news; reviews of films and bands; original art, fiction and poetry; and other college-oriented material, notably including "Verbatim," a weekly overheard-on-campus column.

The paper was co-founded in 1979 by Princeton University students and University Press Club members Robert Faggen, later a professor of literature at Claremont-McKenna College, Marc Fisher, later a columnist for The Washington Post, and David Remnick, who became editor of The New Yorker in 1998.

== About the Nassau Weekly ==
The Nassau Weekly is affectionately known as The Nass. Alumni include The Nation editor-in-chief Katrina vanden Heuvel, Vanity Fair national editor Todd Purdum, architect Peter Bentel, Television Without Pity cofounder Sarah D. Bunting, Slate.com television critic Troy Patterson, New York Times reporter Nicholas Confessore, New York Times reporter David Kirkpatrick and Washington Post staff writer Theola Labbé.

== History ==
On September 26, 2008, The Daily Princetonian reported that, due to financial problems and "a fundamental staff schism," the Nassau Weekly was in the midst of discussions to merge operations with the campus radio station WPRB. In March 2009, Princeton Alumni Weekly reported on the acquisition of Nassau Weekly by WPRB.

== Notable alumni ==
- Nicholas Confessore, political reporter at The New York Times
- Marc Fisher, columnist at The Washington Post
- David Remnick, Editor-in-Chief of The New Yorker
