= Erin Overbey =

American archivist

- Occupation: Archivist, magazine editor, journalist

Erin Overbey is an American journalist. From 1994 until 2022, she worked for The New Yorker as archive editor and Classics newsletter editor. In July 2022, Overbey was fired from The New Yorker. She stated that this followed her raising concerns about racial inequality and gender disparity at the magazine.

Overbey publicly criticized the editor of The New Yorker, David Remnick, in a thread of tweets which went viral on July 25, 2022.
