= Julius Westheimer =

American financial adviser

- Julius Westheimer in 1975
- Born: September 6, 1916; Baltimore, Maryland, U.S.
- Died: August 31, 2005 (aged 88); Pikesville, Maryland, U.S.
- Education: Dartmouth College
- Occupation: Financial advisor

Julius Westheimer (September 6, 1916 – August 31, 2005) was an American financial advisor from Baltimore, Maryland. He is best known for his radio and television work, having dispensed financial advice on WBAL Radio, WYPR, WMAR, WBAL-TV and PBS' Wall $treet Week, and in columns in the Baltimore Sun, Baltimore Evening Sun, and Daily Record newspapers.

== Biography ==
Westheimer was born on September 6, 1916, the son of Milton F. Westheimer, a Baltimore investment banker, and Helen Gutman Westheimer. In his youth, he published a neighborhood newspaper in Pikesville, Maryland, and he later edited the campus newspaper at Dartmouth College, where he earned a bachelor's degree in political science, was elected to Phi Beta Kappa, and graduated with honors in 1938. In his youth, he lived in his uncle's house at 1714 Eutaw Place in Baltimore.

He began work in the toy department at Macy's in New York City for $35 per week. Following World War II, during which he served in the Army Air Corps, he returned to Baltimore to work at Gutman's, the department store founded in 1877 by his grandfather, Julius Gutman. Westheimer eventually became the company's president. In an interview with the Baltimore Jewish Times, he later confessed that he "despised every minute of it." Feeling that he "just wasn't cut out for the retail business," he merged Gutman's with the Brager-Eisenberg department store, and left to begin a career in investment banking.

Westheimer joined the Baltimore investment house of Baker Watts & Co., now Ferris Baker Watts, in Hunt Valley, Maryland, overseeing an investment management group for more than thirty years.

He married Ernestine Hartheimer in 1940, and they had two daughters. After her death in 1985, he married the late Dorrit Feuerstein Kohn (died November 29, 2009), in 1986. They were together until his death on August 31, 2005, six days short of his 89th birthday.

== Media career ==
Westheimer travelled the world, and made a habit of visiting the Baltimore Sun's foreign bureaus, as he believed that the staff would give him better sightseeing and dining advice than the travel agencies. This led to a chance meeting at a luncheon with editor Louis Rukeyser, then chief of The Sun's London bureau, which in turn led to Westheimer writing for the paper. He later had a regular financial column, Ticker, writing more than 2,300 columns from February 22, 1977 to December 28, 2001, along with many feature articles.

When Rukeyser started a syndicated television show about the stock market, he invited Westheimer to appear, which led to regular appearances on the PBS show Wall $treet Week for twenty-nine years from 1971. In 1975, Westheimer began giving financial advice on Baltimore's WMAR TV station. He was employed as WBAL-TV 11's financial analyst in 1981, and began presenting daily financial and investment reports on WBAL Radio in 1982. He was inducted into Research magazine's Broker Hall of Fame in 1994.

He continued as WBAL's financial analyst until his retirement in 2004, presenting morning broadcasts on News Today. From 2004, he began appearing on Baltimore NPR affiliate WYPR-FM in a feature called Julius Westheimer's Money Minute, airing twice daily.

== Other work ==
Westheimer gave investment evening classes at Johns Hopkins University for fifteen years, and security salesmanship lectures at the University of Pennsylvania's Wharton School of Business.

At one time he was president of the Associated Jewish Community Federation of Baltimore. He also served as treasurer of Temple Oheb Shalom, and devoted much time to charity work.

== Bibliography ==
- Westheimer, Julius (1997). Generation of Wealth: Time-Tested Rules for Worry-Free Investing. Bancroft Press. ISBN 978-0963124692.
