= Robert Nurock =

American stock market analyst

Robert J. Nurock
- Born: May 25, 1938; Philadelphia, PA
- Died: February 26, 2017 (aged 78); Santa Fe, NM
- Occupation: Stock market analyst

Robert Jay Nurock (May 25, 1938 – February 26, 2017) was an American stock market analyst who served as a panelist during 1970 to 1989 on the influential PBS series Wall Street Week (1972–2002).

== Early life ==
Robert Jay Nurock was born on May 25, 1938, in Philadelphia, Pennsylvania.

== Career ==
He created the Technical Market Index termed "the Elves" for Wall Street Week, which was used until his retirement from the show in 1989. He was referred to as the 'Chief Elf', a reference to Robert's statements that the 'elves' compute his Technical Market Index.

His index tracked 10 barometers of market momentum, investor psychology, and monetary conditions. New York Times reported that "Over the last 11 years, the elves' signals, both bullish and bearish, have been right 95.1 percent of the time in forecasting whether the market would be higher or lower 52 weeks later. Looking ahead six months, the elves have been right 75.8 percent of the time."

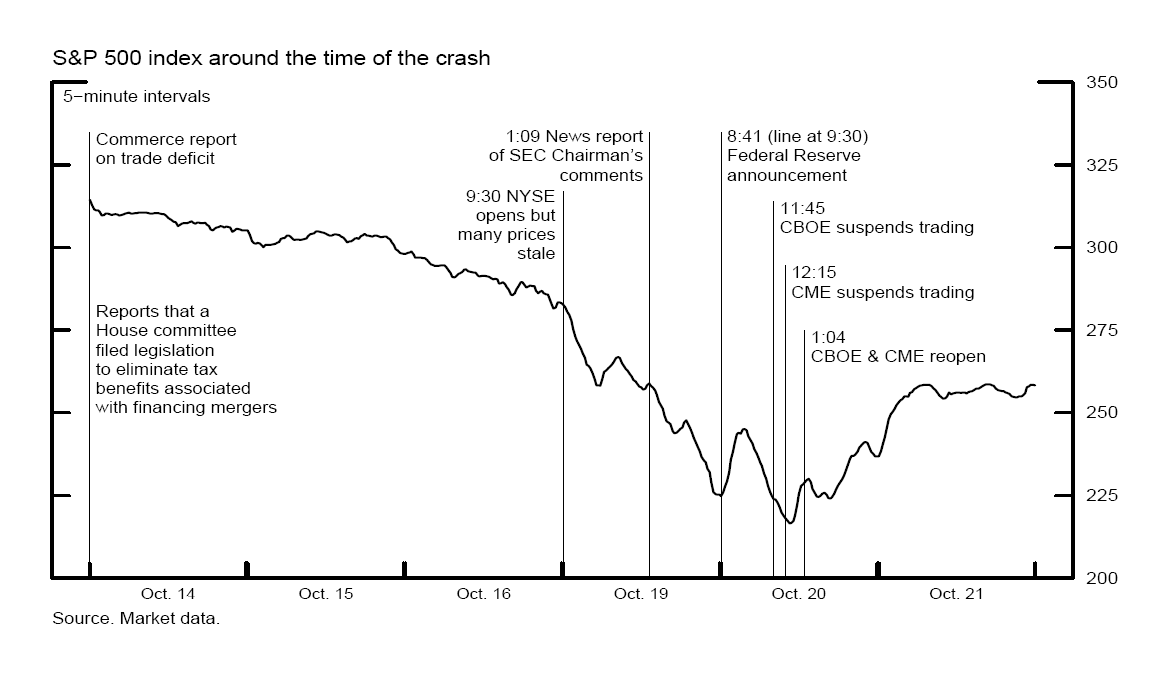
Timeline compiled by the Federal Reserve.

The Elves recommended a buy when the October 1987 crash occurred. Nurock brushed off criticism, the market rebounded and reached the prior level in two years. However, missing the 500-point moves generated skepticism.

In 1989, during a telecast, Nurock and show host Louis Rukeyser disagreed about the market. Nurock later resigned. In the place of Nurock's elves, Louis Rukeyser created his own index relying on 10 technicians each week. Like Nurock's elves, a plus, minus or neutral value was assigned to each opinion. An index of (+5) would be a buy, (-5) a sell. Unfortunately, the new Rukeyser index was found to be a contrarian indicator. Every single time the index was up, the market fell and each time the index fell, the market rose.

Though Rukeyser's technicians were retired in 2001, Nurock's analyses had left a mark on the show. His use of the Technical Market Index on Wall Street Weekly raised public awareness of technical analysis as a valid method.

Nurock's advisory business, Investor's Analysis, published an investment newsletter, The Astute Investor, from suburban Philadelphia until he moved to Santa Fe in 1994. In Santa Fe, he served as the Treasurer of the Fine Arts Committee and Budget Chair of FOCA, Friends of Contemporary Art, founding Chair of the Investment Committee of the Museum Foundation of New Mexico.

== Death ==
He died on February 26, 2017, at his home in Santa Fe, New Mexico.

== See also ==
- Wall Street Week
- Louis Rukeyser
- Technical analysis
