= Stacy Rukeyser =

American television writer and producer (born 1970)

- Born: 1970 (age 55–56)
- Education: Princeton University
- Known for: Writer, producer
- Spouse: Clark Peterson (m. 2010)
- Children: 2
- Parents: Louis Rukeyser (d. 2006) (father); Alexandra Gill (mother)
- Relatives: Merryle Stanley Rukeyser (d. 1988) (grandfather); William S. Rukeyser (uncle)

Stacy Rukeyser (born 1970) is an American television writer and producer. Rukeyser landed her first job writing for CBS drama Without A Trace. She was a writer and an executive producer on the ABC Family series Greek, and worked on the series, October Road, Gigantic, One Tree Hill, The Lying Game and Twisted. Rukeyser is the executive producer of the third season of the Lifetime Series Unreal. She also produced the Netflix drama series Sex/Life.

== Biography ==
Rukeyser is the daughter of Louis Rukeyser, an American financial journalist, columnist, and host of the influential television show Wall Street Week.

Rukeyser graduated cum laude from Princeton University. She also studied at the Warner Bros Dramatic Writing Workshop.

Rukeyser published an article in The Hollywood Reporter about the hostile environment for women in Hollywood. She specifically commented on instances of sexism she experienced while working on the series One Tree Hill, where she was the only female writer for the show, most notably when her coworkers called her names, conspired to install a hot tub on set, and went to lunch trips to Hooters. Rukeyser has commented to Refinery29 that 80% of television shows are run by men and noted the change in media needs to start in the writers rooms. In addition, she commented on the need to talk about "the gender pay gap, oppressive work environments, the lack of reasonable maternity leave policies, and every other issue that stands as a barrier to women in all industries."

Rukeyser married her husband Clark Peterson in 2010. The couple have two children.

== Awards ==
- 2015 Peabody Award for Unreal
- AFI Award for Unreal

== Filmography ==
- 1997: Lois & Clark: The New Adventures of Superman, actor
- 2002: Without a Trace, writer
- 2004: Fearless, writer
- 2005–2006: One Tree Hill, writer and story editor
- 2006: Standoff, writer and executive story editor
- 2007: October Road, writer and co-producer
- 2010: Gigantic, writer and co-executive producer
- 2011: ABC Family series Greek, writer and co-executive producer
- 2011–2013: The Lying Game, writer and co-executive producer
- 2014: Twisted, co-executive producer, writer
- 2015–2018: Unreal, executive producer, writer
- 2021: Sex/Life, creator, executive producer, writer
