= Merryle Rukeyser =

American journalist

Merryle Stanley Rukeyser
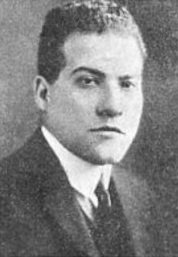
- Born: January 3, 1897; Chicago, Illinois, US
- Died: December 21, 1988 (aged 91); White Plains, New York, US
- Education: B.A. and M.S. Columbia University
- Occupations: journalist; author; professor
- Spouses: Berenice Helene Simon (died 1964); Marjorie Leffler (m. 1965; died 1974)
- Children: 4 including Louis and William
- Relatives: Stacy Rukeyser (granddaughter)

Merryle Stanley Rukeyser (January 3, 1897 – December 21, 1988), was an American journalist and educator in finance and economics.

== Biography ==
Rukeyser was born to a Jewish family in Chicago and grew up in Manhattan. He graduated from Columbia University's Pulitzer school in 1915, and four years later received a master's degree in economics also from Columbia. He became a financial journalist first for the New York Tribune and then the New York Evening Journal. In 1924, he wrote the well-known book The Common Sense of Money and Investments.

By 1930 he became an associate professor at the Columbia School of Journalism and was writing the syndicated financial column "Everybody's Money", appearing daily in 110 newspapers. In the 1970s and early 1980s, he was a frequent guest analyst on his son Louis' TV show Wall Street Week.

Rukeyser married twice. His first wife, Berenice Simon, died in 1964. They had four children: Merryle S. Rukeyser Jr., a publicity agent and longtime executive with NBC; Louis Rukeyser (1933–2006), journalist; William S. Rukeyser (1939-2022), journalist; and Robert Rukeyser, a vice president of American Brands Inc. In 1965, he married Marjorie Leffler. She died in 1974.

Merryle Rukeyser died at White Plains Hospital on December 21, 1988.
