= Working Man (film) =

2019 film directed by Robert Jury

- Directed by: Robert Jury
- Written by: Robert Jury
- Produced by: Clark Peterson; Robert Jury; Maya Emelle; Lovell Holder
- Starring: Peter Gerety; Billy Brown; Talia Shire
- Cinematography: Piero Basso
- Edited by: Richard Halsey; Morgan Halsey
- Music by: David Gonzalez
- Distributed by: Brainstorm Media
- Release dates: February 2, 2019 (SBIFF); May 5, 2020 (United States)
- Running time: 108 minutes
- Country: United States
- Language: English

Working Man is a 2019 American drama film written and directed by Robert Jury in his debut, and produced by Jury, Clark Peterson, Maya Emelle and Lovell Holder. It features Peter Gerety, Billy Brown and Talia Shire in lead roles.

Working Man was filmed in 2018 in and around Chicago. It premiered at the 2019 Santa Barbara International Film Festival, and was released on video on demand services on May 5, 2020, to positive reviews.

== Cast ==
- Peter Gerety as Allery Parkes
- Billy Brown as Walter Brewer
- Talia Shire as Iola Parkes
- J. Salome Martinez as Benny Mendez
- Patrese McClain as Cecilia
- Bradley Grant Smith as Pastor Mark

== Production ==
Working Man was filmed in 2018, with 20 days of shooting taking place in and around Chicago, Illinois, and one day in Joliet. The location used as the factory, the Makray Manufacturing plant in Norridge, closed down in December 2019.

== Release ==
The world premiere of Working Man was held on February 2, 2019 at the Santa Barbara International Film Festival. The film was screened at several other festivals in 2019, including the St. Louis International Film Festival, the Nashville Film Festival, the Woods Hole Film Festival, and the Buffalo International Film Festival.

The film's planned theatrical release on March 27, 2020 was canceled due to the COVID-19 pandemic. Director Robert Jury said, "The timing has just been so strange with this. While it’s personally disappointing for me that we don’t have a theatrical release, in a very strange way, we might have a bigger audience, or at least an audience that maybe can relate to the movie even more because the topic of unemployment is so relevant and prevalent right now."

Working Man was released on Apple TV, Amazon Prime Video, Google Play, Vudu and Fandango Now video on demand services on May 5, 2020.

== Reception ==
On review aggregator Rotten Tomatoes, the film holds an approval rating of 93% based on 45 reviews, with an average rating of 7.5/10. The site's critics consensus reads: "A too-rare showcase for an ensemble of talented veteran actors, Working Man quietly builds into an absorbing -- and timely -- character study." On Metacritic, the film has a weighted average score of 72 out of 100, based on 6 critics, indicating "generally favorable reviews".

Richard Roeper of the Chicago Sun-Times rated the film 3.5 stars out of 4, praising the performances of Gerety, Brown and Shire - noting that "Gerety delivers a performance that is simply great. He plays a man who is simple but not ignorant. Troubled but not troublesome". He added that "Billy Brown gives a screen-commanding performance as Walter, who comes across as an exceedingly kind and decent man but is battling to keep the demons inside him from bubbling to the surface", and of Talia Shire's performance: "Her mannerisms and social awkwardness are reminiscent of Shire's Adrian when we first met her in 'Rocky.'"

Stephen Farber of The Hollywood Reporter called the film a "potent tribute to out-of-work Americans."
