= Cleo Anthony =

American actor

Cleo Anthony is an American actor and model. Anthony is known for his role in the Netflix series She's Gotta Have It. He has also played roles in Divergent, The Prey: Legend of Karnoctus, and Sex/Life.

== Early life ==
Anthony attended high school in Portsmouth, Virginia. Following graduation, Anthony made his way to Miami, where he was homeless for a time before being discovered by a modeling agency.

== Career ==
In 2017, Anthony was cast as one of the three male leads in Spike Lee's 10-episode 2017 Netflix series She's Gotta Have It, a contemporary updating of Lee's 1986 film.

== Selected television ==
Year	Title	Role	Notes
2014–16	Transparent	Derek	Recurring
2015	Extant	Ares	Season 2
2017	She's Gotta Have It	Greer Childs	Series regular
2020	Roswell, New Mexico	Diego	Recurring
2023	Sex/Life	Kam	Season 2
