= The Bridge: The Life and Rise of Barack Obama =

2010 biography by David Remnick

- Author: David Remnick
- Publisher: Alfred A. Knopf
- Publication date: April 6, 2010
- Media type: Hardcover
- Pages: 672
- ISBN: 978-1-4000-4360-6

The Bridge: The Life and Rise of Barack Obama is a 2010 biography of Barack Obama, written by journalist David Remnick. More than 600 pages long, it concentrates particularly on Obama's rise to power and the presidency of the United States. In its first week of release it placed at No. 3 on the New York Times Best Seller list for hardcover nonfiction.

== Content ==
The book's title is a literal reference to a comment made by John Lewis, one of the leaders of the Selma to Montgomery marches of 1965, on the eve of Obama's presidential inauguration, referring to the police attack on demonstrators at the Edmund Pettus Bridge: "Barack Obama is what comes at the end of that bridge in Selma." Some reviewers have noted that the title refers more figuratively to a bridging of people of different races, and a span across time.

The book, approximately 700 pages, is based on interviews with many who were close to Obama, and with Obama himself. It places Obama's career in the context of the American civil rights movement, Obama's family, and influential figures from the political establishment in Chicago, Illinois, covering Remnick's assessment of Obama's poise, charisma, negotiation skills, ambition, and political calculations made during his formative years. It also describes Obama's efforts at self-creation, and of understanding his relationship with his estranged father.

== Reception ==
Patricia Williams, in The New York Times, described the book as "studious and encyclopedic" while John R. MacArthur, writing in The Spectator, accused Remnick of "mythmaking," saying the book has "all the tell-tale signs of an authorised biography."
