= Replicas (film) =

2018 film by Jeffrey Nachmanoff

- Theatrical release poster
- Directed by: Jeffrey Nachmanoff
- Screenplay by: Chad St. John
- Story by: Stephen Hamel
- Produced by: Lorenzo di Bonaventura; Mark Gao; Stephen Hamel; Keanu Reeves; Luis A. Riefkohl
- Starring: Keanu Reeves; Alice Eve; Thomas Middleditch; John Ortiz
- Cinematography: Checco Varese
- Edited by: Pedro Javier Muñiz
- Music by: Mark Kilian; Jose Ojeda
- Production companies: Di Bonaventura Pictures; Riverstone Pictures; Company Films; Ingenious Media; Remstar Studios; Fundamental Films; Lotus Entertainment; 74850 and Global Pictures Media LLC; Ocean Park Entertainment
- Distributed by: Entertainment Studios Motion Pictures
- Release dates: November 24, 2018 (Night Visions); January 11, 2019 (United States)
- Running time: 107 minutes
- Country: United States
- Language: English
- Budget: $30 million
- Box office: $9.3 million

Replicas is a 2018 American science fiction thriller film directed by Jeffrey Nachmanoff, and written by Chad St. John, from a story by Stephen Hamel. The film tells the story of a neuroscientist who violates the law and bioethics to bring his family members back to life after they die in a car accident. It stars Keanu Reeves, Alice Eve and Thomas Middleditch.

It was shown at the Night Visions International Film Festival at Finland in November 2018, and was theatrically released in the United States on January 11, 2019, by Entertainment Studios Motion Pictures. The film was panned by critics and was a box-office bomb, grossing $9.3 million worldwide on a budget of $30 million.

== Plot ==
William Foster and Ed Whittle are biomedical research scientists working for Bionyne Corporation in Puerto Rico, attempting to transfer the mind of a dead soldier into an android with superhuman strength, codenamed Subject 345. William specializes in synthetic biology and mapping of the mind's neural pathways, while Ed's specialty is reproductive human cloning. William successfully captures the soldier's neural map and transfers it into the android's synthetic brain, but the experiment fails when the soldier recoils in horror at the android body and destroys it, killing himself again. William's boss Jones warns him that if he cannot get Subject 345 to work, the company's shareholders will shut the project down.

William takes his wife Mona and three children Sophie, Matt, and Zoe, on a boating trip, but on the way all except William are killed in a car crash. Determined to resurrect his family, he coaxes Ed to bring him the Bionyne equipment necessary to extract his family's neural maps and to clone replacement bodies for them. He successfully extracts their neural maps and tells Ed to dispose of the bodies, but the first major obstacle to his plan presents itself: only three cloning pods are available, forcing him to choose one to sacrifice. He chooses Zoe, the youngest, and erases her memory from the neural maps of the other three. Ed starts the seventeen-day cycle required to create mature replacement clones for William's family, and tells him he has only that long to solve the problem of integrating the neural maps into the cloned bodies, or else they will start to deteriorate by aging at an abnormally fast rate. Integrating the mind into a biological clone was phase two of the research project, a matter to be solved after android transfer. William is forced to keep this secret, since he and Ed have stolen millions of dollars of Bionyne equipment and are breaking bioethics. He spends the seventeen days removing evidence of Zoe's existence from his home, and creating cover stories of illness to explain his family's absence from work, school, and social-media contact.

When William notices his wife's central nervous system reacting to his touch, he realizes that Subject 345 failed because the mind expects connection to a biological body with heartbeat and respiration rather than a synthetic one. He knows now that transferring into the clones will not be a problem, and the failure of android transfer can be solved by programming a simulated mind-body interface to make the android body appear biological. He successfully transfers the minds of his loved ones into the cloned bodies, then goes back to work creating a synthetic mind-body interface. When the next dead body he receives has suffered too much brain damage to be viable, William resorts to recording his own mind for the android transfer. Meanwhile, Sophie has a nightmare of her mother's death, and Mona catches William erasing her memory of the event. He confesses that they died in a car crash and that he resurrected them. The family soon discovers evidence of Zoe's existence that he missed, and he admits that he could not save Zoe and erased their memories of her.

Jones confronts William and reveals that he is aware of what William and Ed have done. He tells him the research is not actually intended for medical purposes, but is being financed by the U.S. government to provide a military weapon, and that William's family are loose ends to be eliminated. William destroys the mind-body interface, incapacitates Jones, and flees, attempting to escape by boat. Jones' henchmen capture William's family. He pursues them to Bionyne, where it is clear that Ed has sold them out. Jones kills Ed and forces William to finish Subject 345. William uploads his own mind into Subject 345, who kills the henchmen and mortally wounds Jones. The two Williams make a deal with Jones: he can live in a cloned body and become rich by working with William-345, selling clone transfers to wealthy people looking for a second life. Meanwhile, William is able to retire in peace with his family, including the newly cloned Zoe.

== Cast ==
- Keanu Reeves as William Foster
- Alice Eve as Mona Foster
- Thomas Middleditch as Ed Whittle
- John Ortiz as Jones
- Nyasha Hatendi as Scott
- Emily Alyn Lind as Sophie Foster
- Emjay Anthony as Matt Foster
- Aria Leabu as Zoe Foster

== Production ==
Riverstone Pictures and Remstar Studios co-financed the film, which was produced by Lorenzo di Bonaventura and Stephen Hamel, sharing producing duties with Keanu Reeves, Mark Gao, and Luis A. Riefkohl. Executive producers include James Dodson, Clark Peterson, Maxime Remillard, Bill Johnson, Jim Seibel, Nik Bower, Erik Howsan, Walter Josten, Ara Keshishian, and Deepak Noyar.

Principal photography on the film began on August 10, 2016, in Puerto Rico.

== Release ==
The film was sold to Entertainment Studios for $4 million, after a private screening at the 2017 Toronto International Film Festival. It was then released in the United States on January 11, 2019. The studio spent $10.5 million advertising the film.

== Reception ==
=== Box office ===
Replicas grossed $4 million in the United States and Canada, and $5.3 million in other territories, for a total worldwide gross of $9.3 million, against a production budget of $30 million.

In the United States and Canada, Replicas was released alongside the openings of The Upside and A Dog's Way Home, as well as the wide expansion of On the Basis of Sex, and was initially projected to gross $4–7 million in its opening weekend. After making just $950,000 on its first day, including $200,000 from Thursday night previews, estimates were lowered to $3 million. It went on to debut to $2.4 million, finishing 12th at the box office, and marking the worst wide release opening of Reeves' career. The film fell 81.5% in its second weekend to $439,731, the ninth worst second-week drop of all-time.

=== Critical response ===
On Rotten Tomatoes, the film holds an approval rating of 9% based on 54 reviews, with an average rating of 3.2/10. The website's critics consensus reads: "Equal parts plot holes and unintentional laughs, Replicas is a ponderously lame sci-fi outing that isn't even bad enough to be so bad it's good." On Metacritic, the film has a weighted average score of 19 out of 100, based on 15 critics, indicating "overwhelming dislike". Audiences polled by CinemaScore gave the film an average grade of "C" on an A+ to F scale.

Variety's Joe Leydon criticized the film for its "cavernous plot holes, risible dialogue, and ludicrously illogical behavior". Charles Bramesco of The Guardian wrote, "After what may be one hundred hours, the film does not so much end as it stops, the score's wrapping-up tone an evident substitute for closure or resolution."
