= Lenin's Tomb: The Last Days of the Soviet Empire =

Nonfiction 1994 Pulitzer Prize winning book

- First edition
- Author: David Remnick
- Genre: Non-fiction
- Publisher: Random House
- Publication date: 1993

Lenin's Tomb: The Last Days of the Soviet Empire is a book by American author David Remnick. Often cited as an example of New Journalism, it won the Pulitzer Prize for General Nonfiction in 1994.

The book is equal parts history and eyewitness account, covering the collapse of the Soviet Union. Opening with the excavation of the corpses of Poles killed in the Katyn massacre, Lenin's Tomb begins by describing the structural flaws present from the country's early days, and then uses individual accounts from a wide variety of contemporary individuals to display the modern consequences of these historical errors and cruelties.

Within the book, Remnick draws heavily on his past work as Moscow correspondent with The Washington Post. In addition to officials and public figures, current and former—one chapter in part recounts Remnick's attempts to interview Lazar Kaganovich, of Joseph Stalin's inner circle—he takes advantage of a wide variety of "everyman"-type sources. These individuals, while not themselves notable, help add richness and texture to Remnick's depiction of the world around them.

In 1997, Remnick published a follow-up work, Resurrection, dealing with the creation of a new Russian state.

The book was the required reading for the University Interscholastic League's Social Studies Competition in 2018. Jay Nordlinger gave a favorable assessment of the book.
