= Geoffrey Colvin =

American writer

- Born: Vermillion, South Dakota, U.S.
- Education: Harvard University; New York University (M.B.A.)
- Occupation: Journalist
- Writing career
- Language: English
- Period: 2005-present
- Genre: Nonfiction
- Subjects: Economics, finance, business
- Website: www.geoffcolvin.com

Geoffrey Colvin is a Senior Editor-at-Large at Fortune Magazine, a position he has held since at least 2005. He is co-author—with Larry Selden (of the Columbia Business School—of Angel Customers and Demon Customers (2003), and sole author of the Penguin-Portfolio books, Talent is Overrated (2008), The Upside of the Downturn (2009), and Humans Are Underrated (2015).

== Early life and education ==
In interview, Geoffrey Colvin has stated that he was "born and raised in Vermillion, South Dakota", leaving there with his parents at age of 14 years. Again, by his own description, he attended and graduated from high school in Carbondale, Illinois, and went to college at Harvard, where he was an economics major. He went on to earn a degree from New York University's Stern School of Business.

== Career ==
As of July 2026, Geoffrey Colvin is serving as a Senior Editor-at-Large for Fortune Magazine, a position he has held at least since 2005.

Colvin co-led a successor to Louis Rukeyser's Wall Street; when that 2002 CNBC launch, again a Rukeyser-hosted program—itself descended from the cancellation of the PBS program, Wall Street Week with Fortune, that same year—ended a two year run for reason's of the host's health. Colvin and Karen Gibbs co-anchored a program with the same "Wall Street Week with Fortune" name, on its return to PBS, until its cancellation in 2005.

== Published works ==
Colvin is co-author with Larry Selden (of the Columbia Business School) of Angel Customers and Demon Customers (2003), as well as sole author of the Penguin-Portfolio books, Talent is Overrated (2008), The Upside of the Downturn (2009), and Humans Are Underrated (2015).

=== As sole author ===
- Colvin, Geoff (2008). Talent Is Overrated: What Really Separates World-Class Performers from Everybody Else (1st ed.). London, England: Penguin. ISBN 9781101079003. Note, the first edition hardcover edition of this work is otherwise associated with the ISBN 9781591842248.
- —, — (2009). The Upside of the Downturn: Ten Management Strategies to Prevail in the Recession and Thrive in the Aftermath (1st ed.). New York, NY: Portfolio-Penguin. ISBN 9781591842965.
- —, — (2015). Humans Are Underrated: What High Achievers Know That Brilliant Machines Never Will (1st ed.). New York, NY: Portfolio-Penguin. ISBN 9781591847205.

=== With co-authors ===
- Selden, Larry & Colvin, Geoff (2003). Angel Customers and Demon Customers: Discover Which is Which, and Turbo-Charge Your Stock (1st ed.). New York, NY: Portfolio-Penguin. ISBN 9781440626715. Note, the first edition hardcover edition of this work is otherwise associated with the ISBN 9781591840077.
