= Sex/Life =

American drama television series

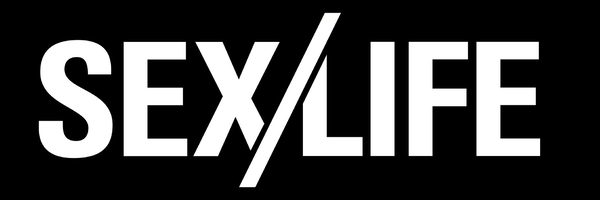
- Genre: Erotic; Drama
- Created by: Stacy Rukeyser
- Inspired by: 44 Chapters About 4 Men by BB Easton
- Starring: Sarah Shahi; Mike Vogel; Adam Demos; Margaret Odette; Cleo Anthony; Darius Homayoun
- Music by: Mark Isham; Isabella Summers
- Country of origin: United States
- Original language: English
- No. of seasons: 2
- No. of episodes: 14

Production
- Executive producers: Stacy Rukeyser; J. Miles Dale; Jordan Hawley; Jessika Borsiczky
- Producers: Chris Hatcher; Scott James Wallace
- Production locations: Mississauga, Ontario, Canada
- Cinematography: David A. Makin; Michael McMurray; Kim Derko
- Editors: Scott James Wallace; Janet Weinberg; Rebekah Fridman; Kelly Soll; Danielle L. Statuto; Katie Wedemeyer
- Running time: 43–56 minutes
- Production companies: De Milo Films; Little Ruke

Original release
- Network: Netflix
- Release: June 25, 2021 – March 2, 2023

Sex/Life is an American erotic drama television series created by Stacy Rukeyser for Netflix. The series is inspired by the novel 44 Chapters About 4 Men by BB Easton and it premiered on June 25, 2021. In September 2021, the series was renewed for a second season, which was released on March 2, 2023. In April 2023, the series was canceled after two seasons.

== Premise ==
Promotional materials described the show as what happens when "a suburban mother of two takes a fantasy-charged trip down memory lane that sets her very married present on a collision course with her wild-child past."

== Cast and characters ==
=== Main ===
- Sarah Shahi as Billie Connelly, a former Columbia University psychology PhD candidate, mother of two, and housewife in an affluent suburban Connecticut community who is suffering from a severe midlife crisis, yearning for the fast-paced life she had with her ex-boyfriend Brad. It is later revealed that her maiden name is Mann. She ends up with the happily ever after life that every woman dreams of but questions if that is really what happiness means.
- Mike Vogel as Cooper Connelly, Billie's strait-laced husband who is an investment banker. He is a "good guy" kind of character; supportive no matter what.
- Adam Demos as Brad Simon, Billie's ex-boyfriend who is in her life again and trying to win her back despite the fact that Billie is married with children. He is a famous music producer and CEO of a record label he founded.
- Margaret Odette as Sasha Snow, Billie's best friend, a psychology professor, and living the single life. She tries to convince Billie that a "good wife life" is all she needs to be happy.
- Cleo Anthony as Kam (season 2), a physician and the head of a global medical charity called First Do No Harm. He was engaged to Sasha 17 years in the past.
- Darius Homayoun as Majid (season 2), Billie's new love interest and a restauranteur.

=== Recurring ===
- Jonathan Sadowski as Devon, Cooper's colleague and friend who is a swinger.
- Meghan Heffern as Caroline, another "fake happy" mother from the suburbs.
- Amber Goldfarb as Trina, Devon's wife (also a swinger) but unhappy with married life.
- Hannah Galway as Emily, Cooper's girlfriend before his marriage to Billie.
- Li Jun Li as Francesca, Cooper's boss. She has feelings for Cooper, and is a successful businesswoman who knows what she wants.
- Wallis Day as Gigi (season 2), Brad's new girlfriend who is pregnant with their baby.
- Dylan Bruce as Spencer (season 2), Cooper's older, openly gay brother and a divorce lawyer.
- Craig Bierko as Mick (season 2), Sasha's agent who is helping take her career to the next level.

== Episodes ==
=== Series overview ===
Season	Episodes	Originally released
1	8	June 25, 2021
2	6	March 2, 2023

=== Season 1 (2021) ===
No. overall	No. in season	Title	Directed by	Written by	Original release date
1	1	"The Wives Are in Connecticut"	Patricia Rozema	Stacy Rukeyser	June 25, 2021
Billie Connelly is a housewife living in Connecticut, married to her husband Cooper and with two young children. While loving her husband and family, Billie cannot stop herself from consistently reminiscing about her past as a wild party girl. The longing for her previous life grows ever stronger as her relationship with Cooper continues to disappoint her sexually. Despite the counsel of her best friend Sasha, Billie also keeps thinking back to her former relationship with Brad, a record producer. Billie documents her desires on her laptop, and this is discovered one morning by Cooper, leading the two to have passionate sex for the first time in years. However, after Cooper leaves for work, Billie impulsively goes to New York City to confide her feelings to Sasha. Upon arrival, Billie is left devastated when she sees Sasha slept with Brad the previous night.
2	2	"Down in the Tube Station at Midnight"	Patricia Rozema	Stacy Rukeyser	June 25, 2021
Billie and Sasha reconcile after the revelation of Sasha's casual hookups with Brad. On her way back to Connecticut, Billie reflects on how she first met Cooper and her reasoning for settling down with him, namely the stability he offered. Billie also reflects on the origins of her relationship with Brad and how she could not resist him. In the present day, Cooper takes Billie out into Brooklyn for a date night, where she again reminisces about how she misses Brad but also is reminded of how she loves Cooper. On their way home, Cooper sneaks them both into a secluded backyard pool where they have sex, seeking to give Billie the kind of thrills she wrote in her journal. However, they are caught by the owner and narrowly escape the police, heightening the thrill even more for them. On returning home, Billie is elated, but Cooper is privately disgusted with himself. Brad also calls Billie unprompted, admitting that he still loves Billie. She denies wanting him in return and ends the call, though she is distressed about doing so, and Brad challenges her over text about her feelings.
3	3	"Empire State of Mind"	Jessika Borsiczky	Jordan Hawley	June 25, 2021
The morning after their night together, Cooper secretly masturbates to passages from Billie's journal about sex with Brad, although he later feels ashamed and is cold to Billie before leaving for work. After dropping Hudson at pre-school, Billie is asked to stay and help the class for the whole day by Hudson's teacher, as Hudson isn't yet acclimatising to being away from Billie. She continues to think about Brad, and in anguish, she calls Sasha for advice. Sasha advises Billie to ditch Brad, stating he is great for sex but toxic in relationships. Billie is reminded of her first meeting with Brad's mother and stepfather, which ended acrimoniously in an argument between Brad and Billie, sparked by Brad's animosity towards his stepfather. It led to a brief breakup, but Billie soon took Brad back after an emotional apology. While he is supposed to be working, Cooper instead covertly follows Brad to the gym. It further stirs Cooper's frustration when he sees how endowed Brad is. Billie and Cooper have sex later that night, but Cooper suffers from erectile dysfunction and premature ejaculation, leaving Billie unsatisfied. Brad visits Sasha to initiate a sexual encounter, but covertly also uses her phone to FaceTime Billie and have her watch their liaison, which arouses her.
4	4	"New New York"	Jessika Borsiczky	Jessika Borsiczky	June 25, 2021
Billie feels anguish regarding Sasha, as they never hid secrets from each other before Brad. Cooper confronts Brad about Billie, but Brad is unrepentant about contacting Billie. During a visit to the city with some of the mothers from Hudson's school, Billie reflects on her past life and confesses her problems to the other mothers, who sympathise and confess similar experiences. Billie confesses to Sasha that she watched her have sex with Brad, though Sasha isn't upset and instead urges Billie to cease contact with Brad given his effect on her. Cooper's friend and coworker, Devon, takes Cooper on a night out to relieve his stress. He attempts to set Cooper up with Emily, an ex, but Cooper cannot commit. However, he does flirt with his boss, Francesca, and considers sleeping with her. Brad calls Billie again and tells her about his confrontation with Cooper, leading Billie to realise she still can't quit him.
5	5	"The Sound of the Suburbs"	Samira Radsi	Jamie Dennig	June 25, 2021
After a failed attempt by Cooper to replicate a sexual move he learned about from Billie's diaries, the couple argue. Billie lies and claims Brad is dating Sasha to relieve Cooper's suspicions, leading to a suggestion that the four have dinner together. The dinner is tense, as Brad challenges Billie about her domesticated lifestyle and makes sly references to their exciting past. It results in an argument between the four, with Cooper and Sasha storming off in disgust at Billie's continued attitude to Brad. After Brad drives Billie home, he asks to see her children, making Billie remember the time when she became pregnant by Brad. Cooper arrives in the city to charm investors at Francesca's request, and after a successful presentation, the two nearly kiss before Cooper decides to spend the evening in Francesca's company.
6	6	"Somewhere Only We Know"	Samira Radsi	Resheida Brady	June 25, 2021
7	7	"Small Town Saturday Night"	Sheree Folkson	Kimberly Karp	June 25, 2021
8	8	"This Must Be the Place"	Sheree Folkson	Stacy Rukeyser	June 25, 2021

=== Season 2 (2023) ===
No. overall	No. in season	Title	Directed by	Written by	Original release date
9	1	"Welcome to New York"	Jessika Borsiczky	Stacy Rukeyser	March 2, 2023
10	2	"Georgia on My Mind"	Jessika Borsiczky	Jai Tiggett	March 2, 2023
11	3	"Seasons of Love"	Jessika Borsiczky	Jamie Dennig	March 2, 2023
12	4	"The Weakness in Me"	Rachel Raimist	Kimberly Karp	March 2, 2023
13	5	"Future Starts Today"	Sheree Folkson	Jordan Hawley & Maria Maggenti	March 2, 2023
14	6	"Heavenly Day"	Sheree Folkson	Stacy Rukeyser	March 2, 2023

== Production ==
=== Development ===
On August 19, 2019, it was announced that Netflix had given the production a series order for a first season consisting of eight episodes. The series was created by Stacy Rukeyser who was also expected to executive produce alongside J. Miles Dale. On September 27, 2021, Netflix renewed the series for a second season. On April 7, 2023, it was announced that the series was canceled after two seasons.

=== Casting ===
On January 30, 2020, it was announced that Sarah Shahi was cast to headline the series. On March 5, 2020, it was reported that Mike Vogel, Adam Demos, and Margaret Odette were cast in starring roles. On February 28, 2022, Wallis Day, Dylan Bruce, Craig Bierko, Cleo Anthony, and Darius Homayoun joined the cast in recurring roles for the second season.

=== Filming ===
Principal photography for the series was originally scheduled to begin in spring 2020, but was later postponed due to the COVID-19 pandemic. Filming for the first season began on August 31, 2020, and ended on December 9, 2020, in Mississauga, Ontario, Canada. Filming for the second season began on February 7, 2022, and concluded on May 6, 2022, in Toronto, Ontario, Canada.

== Release ==
The first season of Sex/Life was released on June 25, 2021. The second season premiered on March 2, 2023.

== Reception ==
The review aggregator website Rotten Tomatoes reports a 21% approval rating with an average rating of 5.5/10, based on 24 critic reviews. The website's critical consensus reads, "Suffocating its more provocative ideas with steamy interludes and melodramatic writing, this erotic drama is too obsessed with sex to ever fully come to life." Metacritic, which uses a weighted average, assigned a score of 45 out of 100 based on 11 critics, indicating "mixed or average reviews".

On September 27, 2021, it was reported that the first season of Sex/Life was watched by 67 million households in its first four weeks following its release on June 25. Season 2 of Sex/Life featured in the Netflix global top 10s for 4 weeks amassing 126.80M hours.
