= University Press Club =

- Type: Freelance Journalist Group
- President: Anika Asthana
- Founded: 1900
- Headquarters: Princeton, New Jersey

The University Press Club is an organization of Princeton University undergraduates who work as professional freelance journalists for local, regional, and national publications. It is the only student-run group of its kind in the country. Press Club alumni have gone on to careers in journalism at publications including The New York Times, the Washington Post, Vanity Fair, Forbes, and the New Yorker and have won the Pulitzer Prize.

In addition to freelancing, Press Club members also run a blog called The Ink, covering campus events at Princeton.

== Overview ==
The University Press Club is a highly selective group of undergraduate students who write professionally for a variety of newspapers and magazines in the northeast and United States. The club was founded in 1900, making it one of the oldest student organizations at Princeton University. Members typically write for a number of papers during their three or four years with the club, filing stories on a range of topics from speeches at the university, higher education trends, and events at Ivy League schools. In the past year, members have been published in papers such as The New York Times, TIME, USA Today, the South China Morning Post, the Atlantic, the Star-Ledger, the Asbury Park Press, and the Times of Trenton.

Members are chosen through a three-month application process called Candidates Period. During Candidates Period, candidates write fifteen mock articles across three "folders," or sections of the application process, and submit them for consideration to Club members. Each candidate meets one-on-one with a Club member after each folder to discuss their stories and receive feedback.

Press Clubbers cover breaking news, feature stories, and sporting events at Princeton University and in the surrounding community. As stringers, each member works with professional editors and is paid on a per-story basis.

On campus, the University Press Club regularly sponsors lectures and events for the Princeton community, including the annual Louis Rukeyser '54 Memorial Lecture Series, which brings prominent journalists to the university. Past speakers include Jill Abramson formerly with The New York Times, David Remnick '81 from the New Yorker, Evan Thomas from Newsweek, Jim Kelly '76 from Time, Matthew Cooper formerly with Time, and Todd Purdum '82 from Vanity Fair. The University Press Club also hosts dinners with visiting journalism professors and alumni throughout the year.

The Press Club is advised and guided by an Alumni Board, made up of Club alumni from a wide range of graduation years.

== History ==
The Press Club was founded in April 1900 by undergraduate journalists who worked as correspondents for newspapers across the country. The club was conceived as a collective reporting enterprise that would pool quotes and leads, and membership was sold to the highest bidder.

In 1915 the Club introduced an application process called candidates period. Over the course of three months, applicants would conference with current members of the club to eventually produce three folders of full-length news stories.

In 1979, a group of Press Club members founded the campus weekly student newspaper the Nassau Weekly.

== Past Leadership ==
- Anika Asthana, Class of 2025
- Emmett Willford, Class of 2024
- Anna Allport, Class of 2023

== Notable alumni ==
- James Barron, Reporter for the New York Times
- Alan Blinder, Professor at Princeton University and former vice-chairman of the Federal Reserve
- Marc Fisher, Editor and Columnist at the Washington Post
- Craig Forman, Silicon Valley entrepreneur; board member at McClatchy Co., former Bureau Chief at the Wall Street Journal
- Adam Frankel, White House Speechwriter for President Obama
- Hank Hersch, Assistant Managing Editor at Sports Illustrated
- Wendy Kopp, Founder of Teach for America
- David Lawrence, Founder of U.S. News & World Report
- Michael McCurry, Former Press Secretary in the Clinton White House
- Todd Purdum, National Editor of Vanity Fair
- David Remnick, Editor-in-Chief of the New Yorker
- Dan Grech, Former Foreign Correspondent for The Miami Herald and NPR show "Marketplace"
- Louis Rukeyser, Host of PBS's Wall Street Week with Louis Rukeyser
- William Rukeyser, Managing Editor of Fortune and Founding Managing Editor of Money Magazine
- Bianca Bosker, Contributing writer for The Atlantic and author of New York Times bestselling books Cork Dork and Get the Picture
- Jessica Stahl, Executive Editor, Strategic Initiatives at Grist
- Logan Sander, Co-founder and Editorial Director at Midstory
- Ben Weissenbach, author of North to the Future
- Sophia Cai, White House reporter at Politico and co-author of West Wing Playbook, 2024 Axios campaign correspondent
