= Nicholas Confessore =

American journalist

Nick Confessore
- Born: Nicholas Francis Alexander Confessore; May 17, 1976 (age 50)
- Education: Princeton University (AB)
- Occupation: Reporter
- Employer: The New York Times
- Spouse: Anna Hoffman (m. 2013)
- Website: nicholasconfessore.com

Nicholas Francis Alexander Confessore (born May 17, 1976) is a Pulitzer Prize-winning political correspondent on the National Desk of The New York Times.

== Early life ==
Confessore grew up in New York City and attended Hunter College High School. He then studied at Princeton University, where he graduated with a degree in politics in 1998. While at Princeton, he wrote for the weekly student newspaper the Nassau Weekly.

== Career ==
Confessore was previously an editor at the Washington Monthly and a staff writer for The American Prospect. He has also written for The New York Times Magazine, The Atlantic Monthly, Rolling Stone, the Los Angeles Times, The Boston Globe, Salon.com, and other publications. At the age of 28, he won the 2003 Livingston Award for national reporting.

He was part of a team of reporters who covered the downfall of New York governor Eliot Spitzer. He also won the 2009 Pulitzer Prize for Breaking News Reporting and the 2008 Sigma Delta Chi Award for deadline reporting from the Society of Professional Journalists as part of the New York Times staff covering the Spitzer scandal.

He shared three Gerald Loeb Awards: the 2015 award for Beat Reporting for the story "Lobbying in America", the 2016 award for Images/Graphics/Interactives for the story "Making Data Visual", and the 2019 award for Investigative reporting for the series "Facebook, Disinformation and Privacy".

== Personal life ==
In 2013, Confessore married Anna Hoffman.
