= David Remnick =

American journalist, writer, and editor (born 1958)

- Remnick at the 2026 Status Summit
- Born: October 29, 1958 (age 67); Hackensack, New Jersey, U.S.
- Education: Princeton University (BA)
- Occupations: Magazine editor, journalist, writer
- Title: Editor of The New Yorker
- Spouse: Esther Fein (m. 1987)
- Children: 3

David J. Remnick (born October 29, 1958) is an American journalist, writer, and editor. He won a Pulitzer Prize in 1994 for his book Lenin's Tomb: The Last Days of the Soviet Empire, and is also the author of Resurrection and King of the World: Muhammad Ali and the Rise of an American Hero. Remnick has been editor of The New Yorker magazine since 1998. He was named "Editor of the Year" by Advertising Age in 2000. Before joining The New Yorker, Remnick was a reporter and the Moscow correspondent for The Washington Post. In 2010, he published his sixth book, The Bridge: The Life and Rise of Barack Obama.

== Background ==
Remnick was born to a Jewish family in Hackensack, New Jersey, the son of Barbara (Seigel), an art teacher, and Edward C. Remnick, a dentist. He was raised in nearby Hillsdale, in a Jewish home with, he has said, "a lot of books around". He attended Yavneh Academy in Paterson. Remnick was a childhood friend of comedian Bill Maher. He attended Pascack Valley High School in Hillsdale, where he studied Russian and was thereby inspired to also study the politics and culture of the USSR.

Remnick graduated summa cum laude from Princeton University in 1981 with an A.B. in comparative literature; there he met writer John McPhee, was a member of the University Press Club, and helped found The Nassau Weekly. His senior thesis was titled "The Sympathetic Thread: 'Leaves of Grass' 1855-1865." Remnick has implied that after college he wanted to write novels, but due to his parents' illnesses, he needed to get a job. Wanting to write, he took a job at The Washington Post.

== Career ==
=== The Washington Post ===
Remnick began his reporting career at The Washington Post in 1982. His first assignment was to cover the United States Football League. In 1988, he became the newspaper's Moscow correspondent, which gave him the material for Lenin's Tomb. He received the George Polk Award for excellence in journalism in 1993.

=== The New Yorker ===
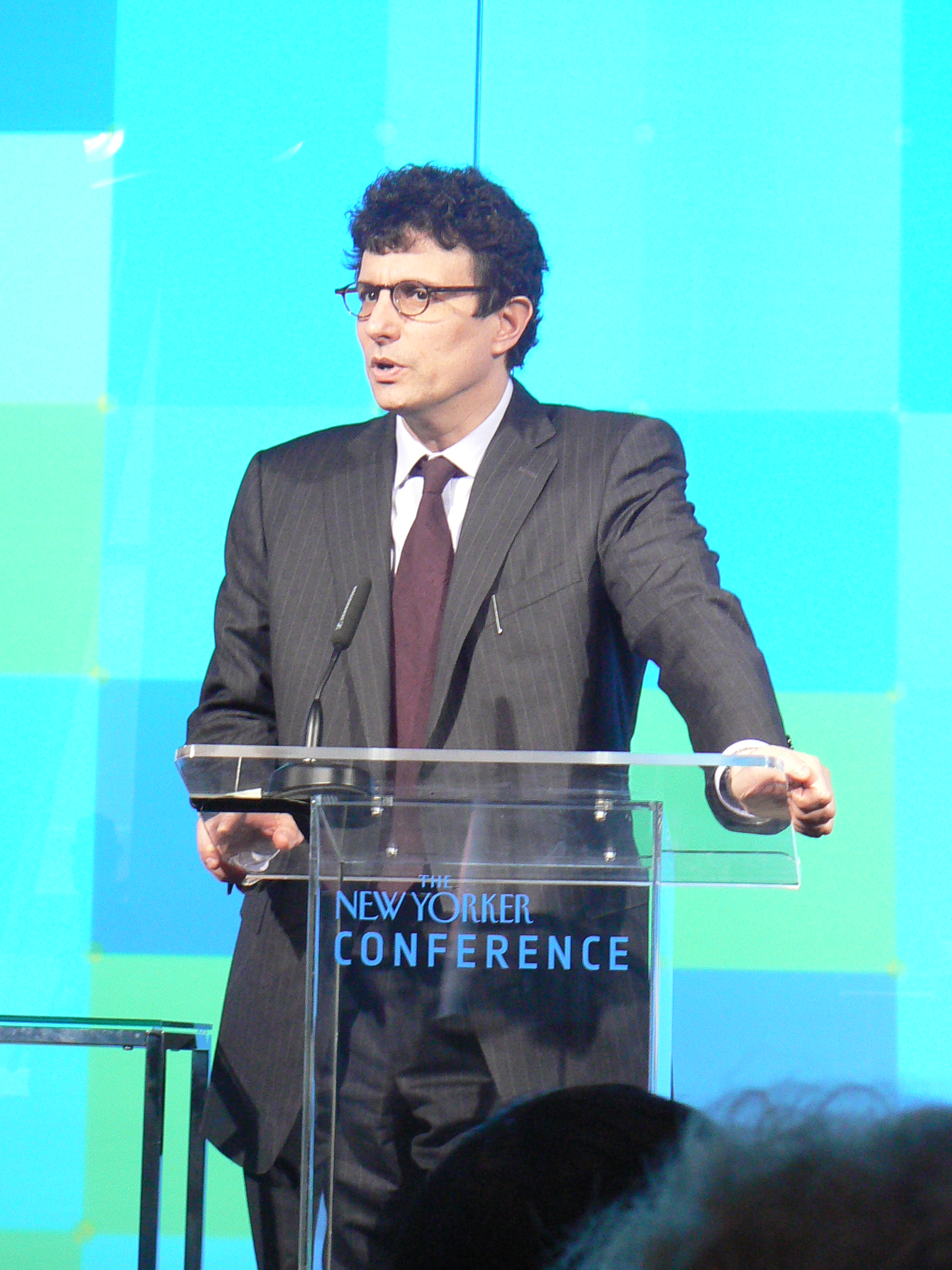
Remnick at a New Yorker conference in 2008

In 1992, Remnick became a staff writer at The New Yorker.

Remnick's 1997 New Yorker article "Kid Dynamite Blows Up", about boxer Mike Tyson, was nominated for a National Magazine Award. In July 1998, he became editor, succeeding Tina Brown. Remnick promoted Hendrik Hertzberg, a former Jimmy Carter speechwriter and former editor of The New Republic, to write the lead pieces in "Talk of the Town", the magazine's opening section. In 2005, Remnick earned $1 million for his work as the magazine's editor.

In 2003, Remnick wrote an editorial in The New Yorker in the lead-up to the Iraq War saying "the United States has been wrong, politically and morally, about Iraq more than once in the past... but... a return to a hollow pursuit of containment will be the most dangerous option of all." In the months leading up to the war, the magazine also published several articles connecting Saddam Hussein to al-Qaeda that relied on unnamed sources or the claims of Secretary of Defense Donald Rumsfeld as evidence. The magazine received some criticism for its journalism during this period. The claims that Hussein and al-Qaeda had a close relationship were false, as confirmed by numerous sources, including a 2008 U.S. military study.

In 2004, for the first time in its 80-year history, The New Yorker endorsed a presidential candidate, John Kerry.

In 2009, Remnick was the subject of an extended Twitter thread by former New Yorker staff writer Dan Baum, whose contract with the magazine was not renewed by Remnick. The tweets, written over the course of a week, described the difficult relationship between Baum and Remnick.

Remnick's biography of President Barack Obama, The Bridge: The Life and Rise of Barack Obama, was released in 2010. It features hundreds of interviews with friends, colleagues, and other witnesses to Obama's rise to the presidency.

In 2010, Remnick lent his support to the campaign urging the release of Sakineh Mohammadi Ashtiani, the Iranian woman sentenced to death by stoning after being convicted of adultery and ordering the murder of her husband by her lover.

Remnick provided guest commentary and contributed to NBC coverage of the 2014 Winter Olympics in Sochi, Russia, including the opening ceremony and commentary for NBC News.

Remnick hosts The New Yorker Radio Hour, produced by WNYC and The New Yorker.

Remnick delivered the commencement address at the 160th commencement of Syracuse University in 2014.

== Personal life ==
In 1987, Remnick married reporter Esther Fein at the Lincoln Square Synagogue. Fein has worked as a reporter for The New York Times and The Washington Post. The couple has three children.

Remnick is fluent in Russian.

== Filmography ==
Year	Title	Role	Notes	Ref
2012	The Other Dream Team	Himself	Documentary about the Lithuania men's national basketball team at the 1992 Summer Olympics.	
2025	The New Yorker at 100	Himself	Documentary about the New Yorker and stories from the magazine's 100-year history.	

== See also ==
- New Yorkers in journalism

Preceded by Tina Brown	Editor of The New Yorker; 1998–present	Succeeded by Incumbent
