= William S. Rukeyser =

American journalist (1939–2022)

William S. Rukeyser (June 8, 1939 – August 16, 2022) was an American journalist who was the founding managing editor of Money magazine and managing editor of Fortune.

== Biography ==
From its founding in 1998 until 2009 Rukeyser was editorial director of Corporate Board Member magazine, aimed at the directors of public companies. He also has appeared on television as a financial commentator on CNN Financial News and ABC.

He was the son of the late financial journalist Merryle S. Rukeyser and the younger brother of the late financial journalist and commentator Louis Rukeyser of Wall Street Week fame.

Rukeyser attended Princeton University, graduating with an A.B. degree in 1961. He also studied English literature as a graduate student at Christ's College, Cambridge University.

After four years as a Wall Street Journal reporter in Europe, he started work at Time Inc. in 1967 as an associate editor of Fortune. In 1968, he signed the "Writers and Editors War Tax Protest" pledge, vowing to refuse tax payments in protest against the Vietnam War. When Money was founded in 1972 he became its managing editor, and continued in that position for eight years before returning to Fortune as its managing editor. In 1988 he left Time Inc., to become editor in chief for Whittle Communications in Knoxville, Tennessee. In 1998 he became editorial director of the new magazine Corporate Board Member, aimed at the directors of public companies. He continued in that role until 2009, after which he continued to devote his time to freelance editing and editorial consulting on projects such as The Partnership: The Making of Goldman Sachs by Charles D. Ellis (Penguin Press, 2008).

Rukeyser and his wife, Elisabeth, were residents of Knoxville, Tennessee, where he was chairman of University Health System Inc. and the Knoxville Jazz Orchestra. He is also a director of the Overseas Press Club Foundation and a member of the advisory board of the Princeton University Press Club.

Rukeyser died of lung cancer on August 16, 2022. He was 83.
