= Todd S. Purdum =

American journalist (born 1959)

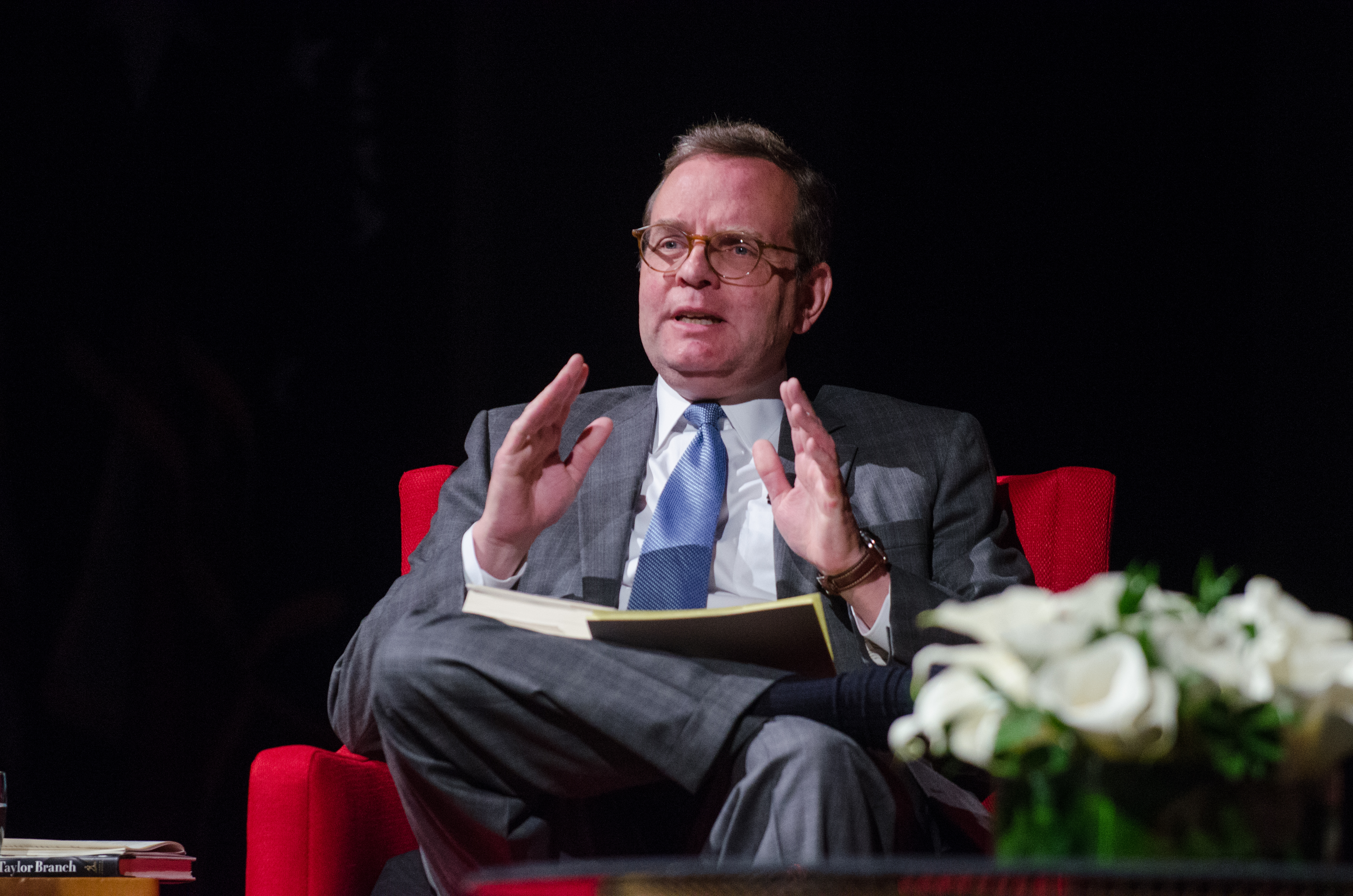
- Purdum in 2014
- Born: Todd Stanley Purdum; December 13, 1959 (age 66); Macomb, Illinois, U.S.
- Education: Princeton University (BA)
- Occupation: Journalist
- Notable credits: Vanity Fair; The New York Times
- Spouses: Tiffany Windsor Bluemle (m. 1987, divorced); Dee Dee Myers (m. 1997)
- Children: 2

Todd Stanley Purdum (born December 13, 1959) is an American journalist who works as a national editor and political correspondent for Vanity Fair.

== Early life and education ==
Purdum is a son of Jerry S. Purdum, a Macomb, Illinois, insurance broker, investor and realtor, and Connie Purdum. He graduated from St. Paul's School in 1978 and from Princeton University in 1982 where he was a member of the University Press Club.

== Career ==
Until late 2005, Purdum was a reporter and the Los Angeles bureau chief for The New York Times. From 1994 to 1997, he was a White House correspondent for the Times. He is now the national editor for Vanity Fair magazine. He was hired as staff writer for The Atlantic in July 2018. In 2021 and 2022 he served as a Fellow at the USC Center for the Political Future.

=== Coverage of Bill Clinton ===
For the July 2008 issue of Vanity Fair, Purdum wrote a scathing article about Bill Clinton, "The Comeback Id". The article analyzed Clinton's post-presidency business dealings, behavior, and possible personal indiscretions, citing several anonymous current and former Clinton aides. When asked about the article by Huffington Post writer Mayhill Fowler, Clinton said (in reference to Purdum): "He's a really dishonest reporter... and I haven't read (the article). There's just five or six blatant lies in there. But he's a real slimy guy." When Fowler reminded Clinton that Purdum is married to his former press secretary, he responded: "That's all right – he's still a scumbag." He later added, "He's just a dishonest guy – can't help it." Clinton went on to observe, "It's all politics. It's all about the bias of the media for Obama. Don't think anything about it. But I'm telling ya, all it's doing is driving her supporters further and further away – because they know exactly what it is – this has been the most rigged coverage in modern history – and the guy ought to be ashamed of himself. But he has no shame. It isn't the first dishonest piece he's written about me or her." The following day, Jay Carson, a spokesman for Hillary Clinton's presidential campaign, stated that Clinton regretted those remarks, but their factual content remained unchallenged by the Clintons.

=== Books ===
- A Time Of Our Choosing: America's War In Iraq (Times Books, 2004)
- An Idea Whose Time Has Come: Two Presidents, Two Parties, and the Battle for the Civil Rights Act of 1964 (Henry Holt and Company, 2014)
- Something Wonderful: Rodgers and Hammerstein's Broadway Revolution (Henry Holt and Company, 2018)
- Desi Arnaz: The Man Who Invented Television (Simon & Schuster, 2025)

== Personal life ==
Purdum married Tiffany Windsor Bluemle in 1987; the couple were subsequently divorced. In 1997, he married former White House Press Secretary Dee Dee Myers, who served President Bill Clinton from 1993 to 1994. Their relationship is the basis for the relationship between C.J. Cregg and Danny Concannon on the TV show The West Wing. Purdum and Myers have two children, Kate and Stephen.
