= East of Havana =

- Film poster
- Directed by: Jauretsi Saizarbitoria, Emilia Menocal
- Produced by: Charlize Theron, Juan Carlos Saizarbitoria, Meagan Riley-Grant, Clark Peterson
- Starring: Michel "Mikki Flow" Hermida Martinez , Magyori Martinez Veitia, Soandres "Soandry" Del Rio Ferrer, Vladimir Abad
- Edited by: Fernando Villena
- Release date: 4 March 2006 (SXSW)
- Running time: 82 minutes
- Language: English

East of Havana is a 2006 documentary film co-produced by South African actress Charlize Theron. The film features three young Cuban rappers: Soandry, Magyori, and Mikki and centers on their experiences in the Cuban underground hip hop scene.

Charlize Theron presented this film at the SXSW Film Festival. The movie chronicles the journey of three underground hip hop artists in Cuba.
