= Louis Rukeyser =

American financial journalist (1933–2006)

- Rukeyser in 1990
- Born: Louis Richard Rukeyser; January 30, 1933; New York City, US
- Died: May 2, 2006 (aged 73); Greenwich, Connecticut, US
- Education: Princeton University
- Occupations: Financial journalist; economic commentator; author
- Spouse: Alexandra Gill (m. 1962)
- Children: 3, including Stacy
- Father: Merryle Stanley Rukeyser (d. 1988)
- Family: William S. Rukeyser (brother)

Louis Richard Rukeyser (January 30, 1933 – May 2, 2006) was an American financial journalist, columnist, and commentator, through print, radio, and television.

He was the host of two television series, Wall Street Week with Louis Rukeyser, and Louis Rukeyser's Wall Street. He also published two financial newsletters, Louis Rukeyser's Wall Street and Louis Rukeyser's Mutual Funds.

Named by People magazine as the only sex symbol of "the dismal science" of economics, Rukeyser won numerous awards and honors over his lifetime.

Rukeyser was famous for his pun-filled humor, and for advising investors to ignore short-term gyrations of the market and think long term. In answering a letter on investing in a hairpiece manufacturer, he quipped that "if your money seems to be hair today and gone tomorrow, we'll try to make it grow back by giving the bald facts on how to get your investments toupée."

== Early life and education ==
Rukeyser was born on January 30, 1933, in New York City, to a Jewish family, the second of four sons of financial journalist Merryle Stanley Rukeyser and Berenice Helene (née Simon) Rukeyser. He was the younger brother of Merryle S. "Bud", Jr. and older brother of William S. and Robert J. His ancestors came from England, Germany and Latvia, with his paternal great-grandfather arriving in the United States about 1840.

In 1950, he graduated from New Rochelle High School. He then attended Princeton University, where he graduated with an A.B. from the Woodrow Wilson School of Public and International Affairs in 1954 after completing a senior thesis titled The Press and Senator McCarthy - a Study of the Coverage of a Controversial Figure by Six New York Newspapers. While at Princeton, Rukeyser's roommate was Wayne Rogers, who would go on to star as 'Trapper John' McIntyre on the hit television series M*A*S*H and much later was a guest on Wall Street Week with Louis Rukeyser owing to Rogers' success as an investor. Rukeyser was also a member of the University Press Club.

== Career ==
From 1954 to 1965, Rukeyser worked as a political and foreign correspondent for The Baltimore Sun newspaper. He then moved to ABC television and worked as an economics correspondent and commentator. He left ABC in 1973. Despite moving to television, he continued to write for newspapers as a syndicated columnist.

In 1970, he started the popular Public Broadcasting Service (PBS) series Wall Street Week with Louis Rukeyser, produced by Maryland Public Television, a PBS member station, at its facilities in Owings Mills, Maryland. The show ran for 32 years, reaching its ratings peak in the mid-1980s. Rukeyser took pride in creating the first television show which focused on Wall Street, using a combination of erudition, plainspokenness, and panache to make the arcane workings of the stock market and the economy better known to the public. In 1987, Wall Street Week was parodied in an episode of Saturday Night Live. Rukeyser was played by Jon Lovitz. In 1988, Rukeyser had a cameo appearance in the film Big Business starring Bette Midler and Lily Tomlin. He played the part of a business man attempting to climb into a cab when Sadie (played by Bette Midler) hits him with her bag and takes the cab.

By the 1990s, Wall Street Week faced increasing competition from rivals like CNBC. In 2002, network executives wanted to replace him with a younger host to help boost ratings. MPT executives offered him a five-minute segment on a newly retooled version of the show; Rukeyser declined. In his final episode, which was broadcast live on March 22, 2002, he deplored the decision of Maryland Public Television's management and urged viewers to write their PBS stations and clamor for the new financial program he would soon create. Maryland Public Television fired him immediately after the broadcast. After Rukeyser's departure, the series was renamed Wall Street Week with Fortune and co-hosted by the editorial director of Fortune magazine, Geoffrey Colvin, along with Karen Gibbs, a former senior business correspondent on the Fox News Channel. But without Rukeyser, the show's ratings fell and Maryland Public Television cancelled the show in June 2005.

3 weeks after leaving Wall Street Week, Rukeyser began a new program, Louis Rukeyser's Wall Street (named after one of his newsletters) on the cable channel CNBC. Highly unusual for a cable network, advertising on the show was limited to before-and-after underwriting announcements similar to those on non-commercial broadcast stations. This was done at Rukeyser's insistence, so that WLIW, the secondary PBS station in the New York area, could offer the program to its viewers on the weekend. In 2003, Rukeyser was diagnosed with multiple myeloma (a type of hematological malignancy). In 2004, the show was stopped at Rukeyser's request after his illness kept him away more than a year.

== Newsletters ==
The monthly Louis Rukeyser's Wall Street newsletter was first published in 1992; two years later, Louis Rukeyser's Mutual Funds was started.

Rukeyser's monthly newsletters continued to be published by KCI Communications and later as Capitol Information Group, owned by Allie P. Ash, Jr. and Brian W. Smith, who acted as publisher and marketing director. Benjamin Shepherd was the last managing editorial director until October 2012 when Rukeyser Mutual Funds was discontinued and Louis Rukeyser's Wall Street was changed to Ben Shepherd's Wall Street.

== The Rukeyser Effect ==
Over the years, stock traders and analysts noted that a company touted on WSW on Friday would experience a spike (rapid short term advance) in its stock price the following Monday. This phenomenon, dubbed "The Rukeyser Effect", was described as a further demonstration of the program's influence. However, in 1987, Professor Robert Pari of Bentley College published an academic article in the Journal of Portfolio Management detailing the results of a study that found that stocks recommended by Rukeyser's guests on Wall Street Week not only tended to rise in price and trading volume in the days preceding the Friday evening broadcast, peaking on the Monday afterward, but also tended to under perform the market for up to a year following the recommendation. Rukeyser strongly disputed this analysis, but ten years later Professors Jess Beltz and Robert Jennings published another academic article in the Review of Financial Economics reporting results consistent with Pari's original findings, and that there was "little correlation between the 6-month performance of a recommendation and the abnormal volume at the date the recommendation is made." They observed that there were differences in return performance between the recommendations of different individuals, but the market could not discern the more insightful recommendations from the less insightful. Another commentator noted "It is mathematically impossible for the thirty million viewers of this show to beat the market, since they are the market."

== Awards and achievements ==
- George Washington Honor Medal of the Freedoms Foundation (presented to his popular radio commentary program, Rukeyser's World, which he ended when he left ABC in 1973) for "an outstanding accomplishment in helping to achieve a better understanding of America and Americans."
- 1973 Gerald Loeb Award for excellence in financial journalism for Wall Street Week, the first given to a broadcaster.
- 1978 Freedoms Foundation award for his newspaper column, begun just two years earlier.
- 1990 first man to receive the Women's Economic Round Table award "for outstanding service in educating the public about business, financial and economic policy."
- 2000 Financial Planning Association of New York's Malcolm S. Forbes Award for Excellence in Advancing Financial Understanding.
- 2004 Gerald Loeb Lifetime Achievement Award
- Nine honorary doctorates from:
  - Johns Hopkins University
  - American University
  - Loyola College
  - Western Maryland College (now McDaniel College)
  - Mercy College
  - Moravian College
  - Southeastern Massachusetts University (now University of Massachusetts Dartmouth)
  - New Hampshire College (now Southern New Hampshire University)
  - Roger Williams University.
- The Fashion Foundation of America named him both the best-dressed man in finance and the most sartorially elegant host in America.
- Playboy, acclaiming him in its own best-dressed list, said he was a "rakish raconteur" and a "personal-style knockout."

== Personal life ==
Rukeyser and his wife, British former journalist Alexandra Gill, had three daughters, Beverley Jane Rukeyser Bellisio, systems analyst (married to Anthony J. Bellisio in 1985); the novelist Susan Athena Rukeyser; and Stacy Alexandra Rukeyser Peterson, a television writer and producer (married to film producer Clark Peterson in 2010).

Although he never appeared on an episode of Seinfeld, Rukeyser was mentioned during the season 7 episode, "The Sponge".

Rukeyser died of multiple myeloma at his Greenwich, Connecticut, home on May 2, 2006. His body was cremated. He was 73.

== Bibliography ==
- How to Make Money in Wall Street. Garden City, N.Y.: Doubleday. 1974. ISBN 978-0-385-07505-3.
- What's Ahead for the Economy: The Challenge and The Chance. New York, NY: Simon & Schuster. 1983. ISBN 978-0-671-44996-4.
- What's Ahead for the Economy: Revised and Updated. New York, NY: Simon & Schuster. 1985. ISBN 978-0-671-55790-4.
