= Wall Street Week =

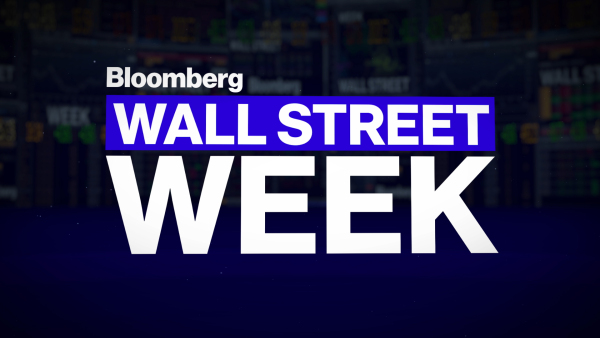
- Also known as: Wall $treet Week with Louis Rukeyser (1970-2005); Wall Street Week with Fortune (2005); Wall Street Week (2015-16); Wall Street Week with Maria Bartiromo (2017); Bloomberg Wall Street Week (2020-Present)
- Genre: Investment News
- Presented by: Louis Rukeyser (1972–2002); Karen Gibbs (2005); Anthony Scaramucci and Gary Kaminsky (2015–16); Maria Bartiromo (2017); David Westin (2020–present)
- Narrated by: Alec Webb
- Theme music composer: Donald Swartz
- Opening theme: "TWX in 12 Bars"
- Country of origin: United States
- Original language: English

Production
- Producer: John Kenner
- Production locations: Owings Mills, Maryland (1970–2002); New York City (2015–present)
- Running time: 60 minutes
- Production companies: Maryland Public Television (1972–2002); SkyBridge Media LLC (2015–16); Fox Business Network (2016–17); Bloomberg Television (2020–present)

Original release
- Network: PBS
- Release: November 20, 1970 – June 24, 2005
- Network: Fox Business Network
- Release: March 18, 2016 – January 25, 2018
- Network: Bloomberg Television
- Release: January 20, 2020 – present

Bloomberg Wall Street Week (WSW) is an investment news and information TV program airing Friday nights on the Bloomberg Television.

== History ==
The original weekly show hosted by Louis Rukeyser aired each Friday evening on PBS in the United States from November 20, 1970, to 2005. The program features a host (or hosts) and guest experts participating in discussions related to the financial markets.

The original show, which was created by Anne Truax Darlington and produced by Maryland Public Television (MPT), debuted on the entire PBS network on November 20, 1970, and was officially titled Wall $treet Week with Louis Rukeyser (W$W) during the 32 years he hosted from November 20, 1970, to March 22, 2002 (the "S" in "Street" was rendered and officially titled in television listings with a dollar sign).

Louis Rukeyser: Host of Wall $treet Week with Louis Rukeyser, which aired on PBS from 1970 to 2002

In June 2002, the show was modified, dropping Rukeyser and changing the name to Wall Street Week with Fortune. Rukeyser went on to host Louis Rukeyser's Wall Street on CNBC (cancelled on December 31, 2004, at Rukeyser's request due to continuing ill health), which was also distributed to PBS stations. Wall Street Week with Fortune, as it was done under the partial aegis of Fortune magazine, was hosted by Geoff Colvin and former Fox News business correspondent Karen Gibbs, ended its PBS run on June 24, 2005.

Wall Street Week was resurrected on April 3, 2015, by SkyBridge Media LLC, an affiliated entity of global investment firm SkyBridge Capital, which was founded by financier and entrepreneur Anthony Scaramucci. The new "Wall Street Week" featured Anthony Scaramucci and Morgan Stanley senior advisor Gary Kaminsky as co-hosts.

In March 2016, the show's licensing rights were picked up by Fox Broadcasting Company and it began airing Friday nights at 8:00pm ET on the Fox Business Network. In April 2017, the show's name was changed to reflect Fox Business naming Maria Bartiromo as the new presenter. In early 2018, Fox Business ceased its production of the Wall Street Week franchise, instead airing a new program titled Maria Bartiromo's Wall Street.

== Show format ==
=== Wall Street Week with Louis Rukeyser ===
- Commentary: Rukeyser would begin the program with a short commentary on the week's financial news, followed by a summation of market statistics.
- Panel Discussion: A panel of financial analysts (usually three in number) offered their opinions on the market, and gave specific stock recommendations. Panelists over the years, who numbered close to 30 by the turn of the 20th century, included financial names like Frank Cappiello, Jim Price, Gail Dudack, Mary Farrell, Michael Holland, Carter Randall, Julius Westheimer and Martin Zweig.
- Viewer Mail: The panelists would answer questions submitted by viewers. This segment always ended with Rukeyser delivering a pun-laden solicitation for letters.
- Interview Prelude: Occasionally, before the final interview, Rukeyser would provide his insight on some aspects of business, such as a certain stock sector (e.g. food, medical, energy), the right choice for mutual funds, and even the best deals on various products. The most commonly repeated commentaries were "Professor Lou's Classroom" (during the back-to-school season), "Uncle Lou Goes Christmas Shopping" (held in December, usually on the Friday before Christmas), and "Sentiment-al Journey" (New Year's Eve).
- Interview: In the final segment, Rukeyser and the panelist interviewed a guest expert.

Over the years, the list of guests included such notables as Paul Volcker, Alan Greenspan, Ross Perot, John Kenneth Galbraith, Malcolm Forbes, and Paul Samuelson.

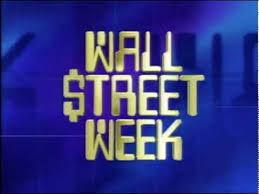
Original Wall Street Week logo from the program first aired on Maryland Public Television and anchored by Louis Rukeyser

==== "Ms. Smythe" ====
After being introduced, guests for the interview segment were escorted from backstage by a woman in formal dress dubbed by production staff and listed in the credits as "Ms. Smythe" ("Miss Smythe" until the late 1980s), always followed by her real name. Various women over the years performed this task, the most famous being Natalie Seltz.

==== "TWX in 12 Bars" ====
During Rukeyser's original tenure, the program featured a distinctive theme composed by Donald Swartz entitled "TWX in 12 Bars," which featured percussion supplied by a teletype machine. The opening bells of the song replicated the chimes at Trinity Episcopal Church at the end of Wall Street which includes the sound of the Westminster chimes. Updated versions of the iconic theme music have since been used in later incarnations of the series.

==== World Trade Center in opening sequence ====
The program's opening sequence moves from the chimes to a pan across lower Manhattan that includes the South Tower of the original World Trade Center, providing a rare perspective where only one of the twin towers is visible. Nearby buildings in the footage indicate that the film was shot from the roof of 1 New York Plaza, a vantage point from which the South Tower—far taller than 1 New York Plaza—completely eclipsed the North Tower.

==== New Year's Show ====
On the last Friday of the year, the host and panelists would appear in black tie, make market predictions and stock recommendations for the upcoming year, and review how well their predictions of one year ago fared.

==== Alternative format ====
On October 23, 1987, the first program following Black Monday, the show dropped its regular format for a special program where Rukeyser interviewed three experts on the impact of the stock market crash.

Afterwards, the show would employ this alternative format whenever events warranted, usually once every few months.

==== Stand-ins for Rukeyser ====
Whenever Rukeyser was on vacation or otherwise absent, one of the show's regular panelists would fill in. For many years this function was usually performed by Carter Randall, though in later years it was usually Frank Cappiello or (less often) Martin Zweig after Randall died in 1999. Both Randall and Cappiello were investment bankers from Baltimore, convenient to where WSW was produced in Owings Mills, Maryland.

==== "An Investment Primer" specials ====
During the 1984 and 1985 pledge-drive seasons, Rukeyser hosted two "Investment Primer" specials, introducing viewers to the stock market and how it worked. The first show, which aired in 1984, dealt with stocks, bonds, and gold; whereas the second show in 1985 dealt with mutual funds, options and commodities. Some of the guests included Stan Weinstein (editor of The Professional Tape Reader), Peter Lynch (manager of the Magellan funds at Fidelity Investments), and Dick Fabian (editor for "The Telephone Switch Newsletter")

=== Wall Street Week with Fortune ===
With the new hosts came a change in format:

- Opening report: Geoffrey Colvin and Karen Gibbs presented separate news reports on major stories impacting the market.
- Viewer Mail: The hosts answered questions from viewers.
- Interviews: The hosts conducted separate guest interviews; Gibbs handled interviews related to specific investing issues, while Colvin handled interviews relating to politics and the overall economy.
- Closing Commentary: A brief commentary by Colvin.

The new show's theme music was an updated, more orchestral version of "TWX in 12 Bars", produced again by Don Swartz and Don Barto.

Without Louis Rukeyser as host, this new version suffered from lower ratings, neither capturing a new more youthful market as PBS had intended, nor retaining the original viewers. It was canceled after three seasons.

=== Wall Street Week Index ===
During its run, the show used two different indexes to predict future market trends:

From 1970 to 1989, the show used the Wall Street Week Index (later known as the WSW Technical Market Index), a composed financial index developed by Robert Nurock. The analysis consisted of ten separate technical indicators, each of which was assigned a value of either +1 (for an upwards prediction), -1 (for a downwards prediction), or 0 (neutral)). A net balance of +5 (or higher) was interpreted as a buy signal, while a reading of -5 (or lower) was a sell signal. Rukeyser irreverently named the index "The Elves" (a reference to the term Gnomes of Zurich), and dubbed Nurock the "Chief Elf." After being in neutral for a considerable period of time, Rukeyser requested significant changes in the makeup of the index. Nurock refused since he believed his ten indicators were still the best way to judge the technical aspects of the market. This ended Nurock's association with the show and the Index was replaced.

Used from 1989 to the end of the Rukeyser era, the Elves Index was also a reading of ten indicators scored in the same manner as the Wall Street Week Index. Instead of reflecting technical factors, the indicators now represented the personal sentiment of ten market analysts about the direction of the market over the next three months. The Elves Index had more volatility and gave more buy and sell signals than the old Wall Street Week Index, but was not as highly regarded. In 1998, one magazine even suggested the Elves Index was more useful as a contrarian tool, citing three examples where buy signals were followed by periods of market drift or contraction. Later, Rukeyser added an Elves Index for the NASDAQ. This index had one of the worst predictive records of any public index.

The indexes were "retired" by Rukeyser after the September 11, 2001 attacks. At that point, the indexes were signalling a very strong sell signal. However, as was usually the case, it was an excellent time to do the opposite as the market rallied significantly after the initial selloff.

== Show popularity ==
The premiere of WSW on November 20, 1970, was carried on eleven stations of the Eastern Educational Television Network. The show rapidly grew in coverage and viewers until it became one of the most popular programs on the newly created PBS member stations. At its peak in the 1980s, the program aired on over 300 stations, and claimed a viewership of 4,100,000 households, which meant more people watched WSW every week than read the Wall Street Journal. The program became a major source of profit for both MPT and PBS through underwriting support and viewer pledges (it is estimated PBS earned $5,000,000 profit annually from the show).

=== The Rukeyser Effect ===
Over the years, stock traders and analysts noted that a company touted on WSW on Friday would experience a run-up in its stock price the following Monday. This phenomenon, dubbed "The Rukeyser Effect", was stated to be a further demonstration of the program's influence. However, in 1987, Prof. Robert Pari of Bentley College published an academic article in the Journal of Portfolio Management detailing the results of a study that found that stocks recommended by Rukeyser's guests on Wall Street Week not only tended to rise in price and trading volume in the days preceding the Friday evening broadcast, peaking on the Monday afterward, but thereafter those stocks tended to drop in price and under-perform the market for up to a year following the recommendation. Rukeyser strongly disputed this claim, but ten years later Professors Jess Beltz and Robert Jennings published another academic article in the Review of Financial Economics reporting results consistent with Pari's original findings, and that there was "little correlation between the 6-month performance of a recommendation and the abnormal volume at the date the recommendation is made." They observed that there were differences in return performance between the recommendations of different individuals, but the market could not discern the more insightful recommendations from the less insightful. Another commentator observed "It is mathematically impossible for the thirty million viewers of this show to beat the market, since they are the market."

== Rukeyser as host ==
Louis Rukeyser conducted the proceedings with a wry sense of humor (including the use of puns) and a reassuring manner. In 1980 Rukeyser explained his hosting philosophy to The New York Times as, "I am talking to one person, whom I regard as intelligent, with a good sense of humor, but not all that technically knowledgeable." He instructed panelists and guests not to use technical jargon and economic theories on the show, but rather talk about making money, because, "Economics puts people to sleep. Money wakes them up."

== Rukeyser's dismissal ==
From its ratings peak in the early 1980s, WSW suffered a long steady decline in viewers due to competition from shows such as the Nightly Business Report, cable programs like Moneyline, and cable networks such as CNBC. By 2001 viewership was down to 1,500,000 households and demographics showed that the average WSW viewer was 65 years old (about the same age as Rukeyser). MPT began to discuss the possibility of updating the format in an effort to reverse these trends. On March 21, 2002, MPT announced that beginning in June the program would be renamed Wall Street Week with Fortune, would be a collaboration between MPT and Fortune magazine, and would feature two new cohosts. Rukeyser was invited to remain with the program in a reduced role as a senior correspondent, but he turned down the offer.

The following evening, Rukeyser opened the telecast by announcing "A funny thing happened to me on the way to the studio this week—I got ambushed." He criticized MPT's decision to change the show format, announced that he was developing a new business program for PBS, and concluded his commentary by asking viewers to write to their local PBS station and request it carry his new show. After the broadcast MPT dismissed Rukeyser and executive producer Rich Dubroff. Over the next three months Marshall Loeb and Ray Brady served as guest hosts while the new format was put in place.

Despite "ambushing" Rukeyser, the show's trend of losing viewers continued as the show floundered on without Rukeyser's trusted presence and was terminated in early 2005.

In 2011, Maryland Public Television anchor Jeff Salkin licensed the name to start a website offering video interviews and newsletters for an annual fee. The URL now redirects to the MPT website.

On January 23, 2025, Louis Rukeyser's final episode of WSW was uploaded to the American Archive of Public Broadcasting and is available for public viewing.

== SkyBridge revival of "Wall Street Week" franchise ==
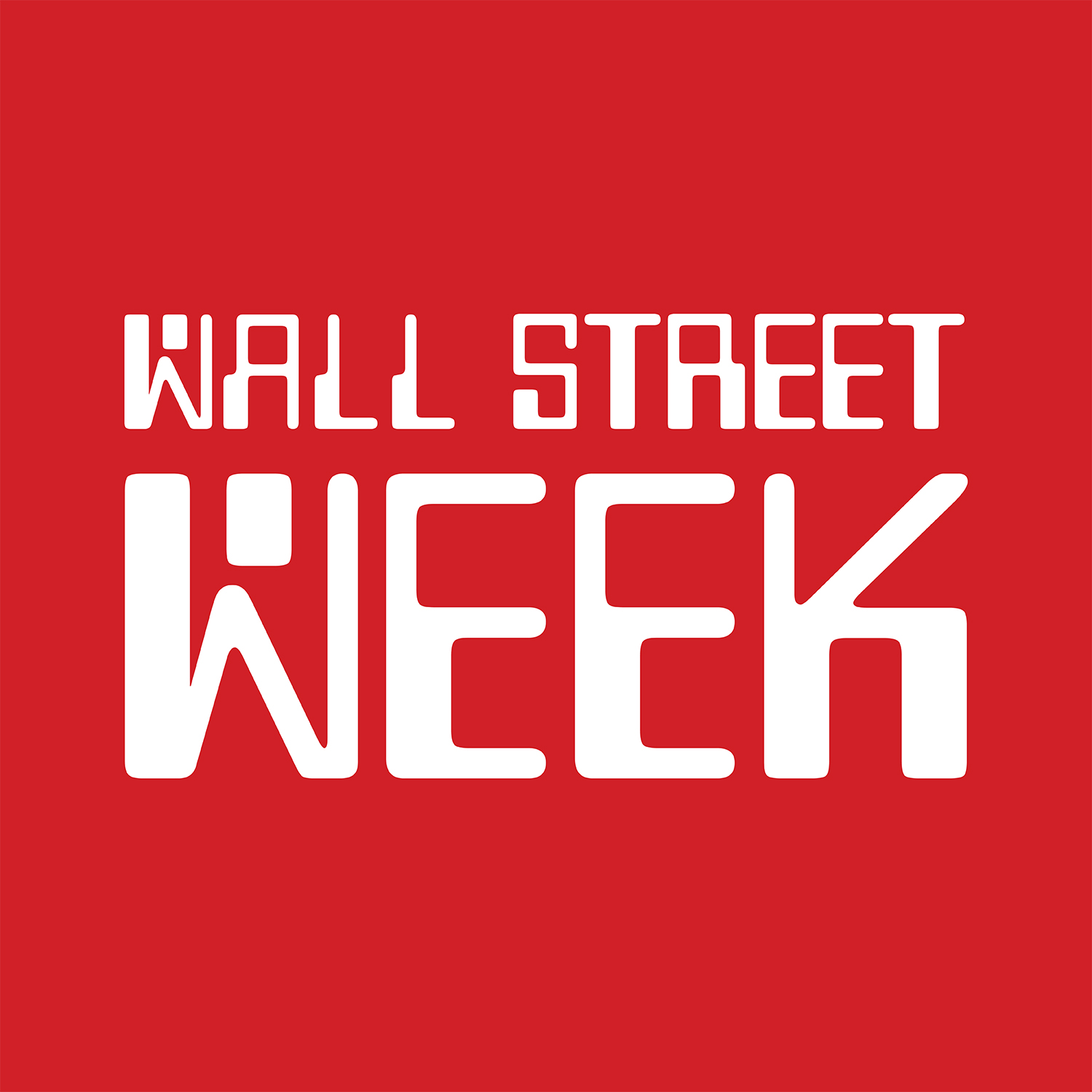
Logo for the SkyBridge Media revival of the iconic investment news program. It included the MICR font of the original with new styling and color, but scrapped the stylized "$" for the "S" in "Wall Street Week".

In May 2014, SkyBridge Capital acquired licensing rights to Wall Street Week, creating a new entity, SkyBridge Media, for the purpose of re-launching the show.

The new Wall Street Week originally featured SkyBridge founder and managing partner Anthony Scaramucci and Morgan Stanley senior advisor Gary Kaminsky as hosts, and the format has been refreshed to maintain the spirit of the original show while modernizing certain aspects of the presentation.

The first episode of the new "Wall Street Week" aired April 19, 2015 and was streamed from its website, WallStreetWeek.com. Airtime for the show was purchased on television stations in New York, Chicago, San Francisco and Washington. The first episode featured special guest "bond king" Jeffrey Gundlach of DoubleLine Capital and panelists Liz Ann Sonders (who was a frequent panelist on the original "Wall Street Week with Louis Rukeyser") of Charles Schwab and Jonathan Beinner of Goldman Sachs Asset Management. Gundlach's commentary on the show, where he called for a potential crash in the junk bond market, made news across Wall Street following the premiere.

== Brief stint on Fox Business Network ==
The show was picked up by Fox Business Network for a brief period with its first episode airing there on March 18, 2016. Scaramucci stepped away from his position hosting the show after Donald Trump added him to his transition team as an economic advisor. Maria Bartiromo was named by Fox Business as the show's permanent anchor in April 2017.

Fox Business Network aired the program every Friday night at 8 pm ET on with the replays airing Friday nights at 8:30 PM ET, 12 and 12:30 AM ET, and Saturday and Sunday mornings at 9 & 9:30 AM ET.

Again, the opening bars (only) of "TWX in 12 Bars" is used for the opening, with a quote attributed to Rukeyser, "This show has never been solely about investments. We've talked about anything that affected people and their money," with both Scaramucci and Kaminsky featured in the opening.

In January 2018, Fox Business Network ceased its production and broadcasting of Wall Street Week opting instead to establish a new program, which was to be titled Maria Bartiromo's Wall Street, in its place.

== Bloomberg Wall Street Week ==
Bloomberg began airing a new version of the series, titled Bloomberg Wall Street Week, on January 10, 2020, with David Westin as the show's anchor. As with the previous Fox edition, a newly recorded version of the "TWX In 12 Bars" theme was commissioned for this latest series.
