= Denver and Delilah Productions =

American media production company

Denver & Delilah Productions, Inc.
- Type: Private
- Industry: Production company
- Founded: 2003; 23 years ago
- Founders: Charlize Theron
- Headquarters: Los Angeles, U.S.
- Website: https://denveranddelilah.com/

Denver & Delilah Productions, Inc. also known as Denver & Delilah Films, is an American film & television production company founded by actress and producer Charlize Theron. It is based in Los Angeles, California.

== History ==
Charlize Theron founded the company in 2003, and named it after her two dogs Denver and Delilah. The company's film productions include the 2003 film Monster, 2006's East of Havana, 2007's Sleepwalking, 2011's Young Adult and 2017's Atomic Blonde.

== Collaborations and deals ==
In July 2013, the company signed on with Bunim/Murray Productions to develop and produce unscripted programming for television. In January 2015, Denver & Delilah signed a first-look deal with Universal Cable Productions to develop and produce scripted series for NBCUniversal, and for that the company hired Laverne McKinnon as head of scripted television. Beth Kono and A.J. Dix also partnered with Theron on these projects. One project in development, with comic book writer Greg Rucka, is an adaptation of the stop-motion animated comedy web series The Most Popular Girls in School. More recently, her production company received a first-look deal with HBO and HBO Max.

== Filmography ==
=== Films ===
Year	Title	Director	Gross (worldwide)	Notes
2003	Monster	Patty Jenkins	$60.4 million	Co-production with K/W Productions
2006	East of Havana	Jauretsi Saizarbitoria; Emilia Menocal	—N/a	
2007	Sleepwalking	William Maher	—N/a	Co-production with Dream7 Entertainment
2011	Young Adult	Jason Reitman	$22.6 million	Co-production with Mandate Pictures, Mr. Mudd and Right of Way Films
2015	Dark Places	Gilles Paquet-Brenner	$3.5 million	Co-production with Exclusive Media Group and Mandalay Pictures
2016	Brain on Fire	Gerard Barrett	—N/a	Co-production with Foundation Features and Broad Green Pictures
2017	Atomic Blonde	David Leitch	$100 million	Co-production with Sierra/Affinity, Chickle the Cop Productions, TGIM Films and 87Eleven Productions
2018	Tully	Jason Reitman	$15.6 million	Co-production with Bron Studios and Right of Way Films
2018	Gringo	Nash Edgerton	$11 million	Co-production with Blue-Tongue Films
2018	A Private War	Matthew Heineman	$3.8 million	Co-production with Acacia Filmed Entertainment, Savvy Media Holdings and Thunder Road Pictures
2019	Long Shot	Jonathan Levine	$52.8 million	Co-production with Good Universe and Point Grey Pictures
2019	Murder Mystery	Kyle Newacheck	—N/a	Co-production with Happy Madison Productions, Endgame Entertainment, Vinson Films, Tower Hill Entertainment, and Mythology Entertainment
2019	Bombshell	Jay Roach	$56.1 million	Co-production with Bron Studios, Annapurna Pictures, Gramsci, Lighthouse Management & Media and Creative Wealth Media
2020	The Old Guard	Gina Prince-Bythewood	—N/a	Co-production with Skydance Media and Marc Evas Productions
2025	The Old Guard 2	Victoria Mahoney	—N/a	Co-production with Skydance Media and Marc Evas Productions
2026	Apex	Baltasar Kormákur	—N/a	Co-production with Chernin Entertainment, Ian Bryce Productions, and RVK Studios

=== Television ===
Year	Title	Creator	Network	Notes
2017	Girlboss	Kay Cannon	Netflix	Cancelled after one season
2017–2019	Mindhunter	Joe Penhall	Netflix	Nominated for an Emmy Award
2023	Last Call: When a Serial Killer Stalked Queer New York	Anthony Caronna & Howard Gertler	HBO	
