= Anthony Caronna =

American film director

- Occupation: Film producer
- Years active: 2011–present

Anthony Caronna is an American film director. They have directed the documentary film Susanne Bartsch: On Top (2017), and directed an episode of Pride (2021), and Last Call: When a Serial Killer Stalked Queer New York (2023).

== Career ==
In 2017, Caronna directed Susanne Bartsch: On Top a documentary revolving around Susanne Bartsch, which had its world premiere at the Hot Docs Canadian International Film Festival. It was later acquired by The Orchard, with RuPaul, Fenton Bailey and Randy Barbato boarding as executive producers.

In 2019, Caronna served as a co-producer on Wrinkles the Clown directed by Michael Beach Nichols, a documentary revolving around Wrinkles the Clown. It was released on October 4, 2019, by Magnet Releasing.

In 2021, Caronna directed an episode of Pride for FX, produced by Killer Films and Vice Studios.

In 2023, Caronna co-created and directed Last Call: When a Serial Killer Stalked Queer New York based upon the book by Elon Green, executive produced by Howard Gertler, Liz Garbus, Dan Cogan, and Charlize Theron for HBO.

== Personal life ==
Caronna goes by they/them pronouns.
