= In Corpore =

- Directed by: Sarah Jayne; Ivan Malekin
- Written by: Sarah Jayne; Ivan Malekin
- Produced by: Sarah Jayne; Ivan Malekin
- Starring: Clara Francesca Pagone; Naomi Said; Kelsey Gillis; Sarah Timm; Christopher Dingli; Frank Fazio
- Cinematography: Diego García Gordo; George Ivanoff; Ylenia Kay; William Sheridan
- Edited by: Ivan Malekin
- Music by: Fabio Guglielmo Anastasi; Raphael Fimm; Gerard Mack
- Production company: Nexus Production Group
- Distributed by: Nexus Production Group
- Release date: 26 November 2020
- Running time: 100 minutes
- Country: Australia
- Language: English

In Corpore is a 2020 Australian drama anthology film directed by Sarah Jayne and Ivan Malekin, starring Clara Francesca Pagone, Naomi Said, Kelsey Gillis, Sarah Timm, Christopher Dingli and Frank Fazio.

== Plot ==
A sensual, sex-positive exploration of contemporary relationships, shown through four anthological stories set in Melbourne, Malta, Berlin and New York. In Melbourne, polyamorous Julia strays from the protocols of her marriage to a monogamous partner; in Malta, Anna hides a secret from her husband Manny; in Berlin, sugar baby Milana alienates her real life lover Rosalie; and in New York Julia faces the consequences of her affair. In Corpore delves deep into the gray areas of relationships, revealing couples under strain, loyalties tested, and what happens when one partner’s desires deviate from the expectations of the relationship – be it traditional or open.

== Cast ==
- Clara Francesca Pagone as Julia
- Naomi Said as Anna
- Kelsey Gillis as Milana
- Sarah Timm as Rosalie
- Christopher Dingli as Manny
- Frank Fazio as Henri
- Amelia June as Zara
- Simone Alamango as Nina
- Don Bridges as Tim
- Naomi Lisner as Anita

== Release ==
The film was released on 26 November 2020.

== Reception ==
Andrew Stover of Film Threat gave the film a score of 7.5/10 and called it "Fearlessly acted, adequately shot, and nicely edited".

Frank Scheck of The Hollywood Reporter wrote while the segments "aren’t particularly strong on their own", they "coalesce to form an incisive depiction of how conflicting desires and philosophies can affect relationships."

Hagan Osborne of FilmInk wrote that the film "offers a unique look at contemporary relationships."
