= After the Act (film) =

- Directed by: Sarah Jayne Portelli; Ivan Malekin
- Written by: Ivan Malekin
- Produced by: Sarah Jayne Portelli; Ivan Malekin
- Starring: Laura Petracco; Jacob Lefton; Jessica Sy
- Cinematography: Dennis Noack
- Edited by: Ivan Malekin
- Music by: Davide Perico
- Production companies: NewCrcleFilms; Nexus Production Group; Spitshine VFX
- Distributed by: Nexus Production Group
- Release date: December 31, 2025
- Language: English

After the Act is a 2025 improvised drama ﬁlm by Ivan Malekin and Sarah Jayne Portelli. The story unfolds over 24 hours in Berlin and examines what happens when an act of betrayal unravels the lives and relationships of three young adults.

== Plot ==
Sam confesses to his girlfriend, Mia, that he slept with their mutual friend, Becca, the previous night.

Over the course of the next 24 hours, the three attempt to process the confession as their relationships are tested by guilt, jealousy, and unresolved feelings.

== Cast ==
- Laura Petracco as Mia
- Jacob Lefton as Sam
- Jessica Sy as Becca
- Alexandra Johansson as Simone Dahlberg
- Anna-Maria Okot as Anastasia
- Mukesh Lynch as Emil

== Production ==
Principal photography took place in Berlin over four days in 2023. Jacob Lefton was cast after previously auditioning for an earlier film by director Ivan Malekin, while Laura Petracco and Jessica Sy were cast through an open casting process.

After the Act was the fifth improvised feature film produced by Nexus Production Group. The actors spent extensive time in rehearsal to develop their characters before filming, allowing dialogue and performances to emerge naturally on set.

During post-production, the filmmakers decided to expand the story and returned to Berlin in 2024 for two additional days of filming, adding new scenes centred on Becca.

== Release ==
After the Act premiered on 3 December 2025 at Admiral Kino in Vienna. It was subsequently screened at Sputnik Kino in Berlin on 9 December, followed by an extended theatrical run at Eclipse Cinema in Melbourne from 11–21 December 2025. Selected screenings featured question-and-answer sessions with the filmmakers.

The film was digitally released on Apple TV and Amazon Prime Video on 26 June 2026.

== Reception ==
After the Act received generally positive reviews from critics. Alan Ng of Film Threat gave the film a score of 7/10 and said It’s an example of what indie dramas can deliver that big studio films can’t. Ken Greaves of IndyRed gave the film 4.5 out of 5 stars, praising the performances, direction, and writing. Cain Noble Davis of FilmInk wrote that After the Act was "like watching a gentle breeze brush over an open wound on a heart. Over. And over. And over again." Jeff Turner of Action Reloaded described the film as "an authentic and surprisingly affecting look at the fragile nature of human relationships."
