= Richard Rogers (serial killer) =

American serial killer (born 1950)

Richard Westall Rogers Jr.
- Rogers's NJDOC Mugshot
- Born: June 16, 1950 (age 76); Plymouth, Massachusetts, U.S.
- Other name: "The Last Call Killer"
- Occupation: Surgical nurse
- Years active: 1973–1993
- Status: Incarcerated
- Convictions: First degree murder (2 counts); Hindering apprehension (2 counts)
- Penalty: Life imprisonment

Details
- Country: United States
- State: New Jersey
- Killed: 2–7+
- Date apprehended: May 28, 2001
- Imprisoned at: New Jersey State Prison, Trenton, New Jersey

Richard Westall Rogers Jr. (born June 16, 1950), known as The Last Call Killer, is an American serial killer. After being acquitted for the murder of a college student in Maine, he moved to New Jersey, where he murdered and dismembered two gay men in 1992 and 1993. His modus operandi consisted of luring the men from piano bars in Manhattan, murdering and dismembering them at an unknown location, and dumping their bodies in garbage bags along highways in New Jersey.

Rogers was not arrested until 2001, when a new forensic technique was used to uncover his fingerprints from the bags he wrapped his victims' body parts in. Rogers was later convicted of two counts of first degree murder and two counts of hindering apprehension. He is now serving two consecutive life sentences in New Jersey State Prison and has never spoken about the murders. Along with the murders of which he was convicted, Rogers is suspected of murdering several other men in several other states from the 1970s to the 1990s.

== Early life ==
Rogers was born on June 16, 1950, in Plymouth, Massachusetts. He was the eldest of five children, raised by his father, a lobsterman, and his mother, a telephone worker. In the late 1950s, Rogers and his family relocated to Florida so his father could work a higher-paying job in sheet metal manufacturing. His father taught him how to hunt deer and ducks, and catch fish.

As an adolescent, Rogers was skinny and timid. This, along with his effeminate personality and high-pitched voice, made him a target of bullying at Palmetto High School. Much to the dismay of his father, Rogers did not show an interest in sports, instead preferring to go to girl scout meetings with his mother. Rogers was also a straight-A student, and a member of the French club at his school.

In the late 1960s, Rogers allegedly grabbed a knife from his home and used it to stab his neighbor, an older woman. Because of the attack, Rogers was briefly institutionalized, but was soon released, and graduated from Palmetto High School in 1968.

== Adulthood ==
=== College ===
Richard Rogers attended Florida Southern College in Lakeland, Florida. While in college, Rogers was described as a quiet loner, who largely kept to himself. However, he did have a few friends—most notably his second roommate. He and his roommate were described as being "joined at the hip" during the majority of their time at university. Although Rogers was not a part of any clubs, he and some of his friends joined Circle K, a Kiwanis service organization. Rogers graduated from Florida Southern College in 1972, earning a Bachelor of Arts degree in French.

=== Killing of Frederic Spencer ===
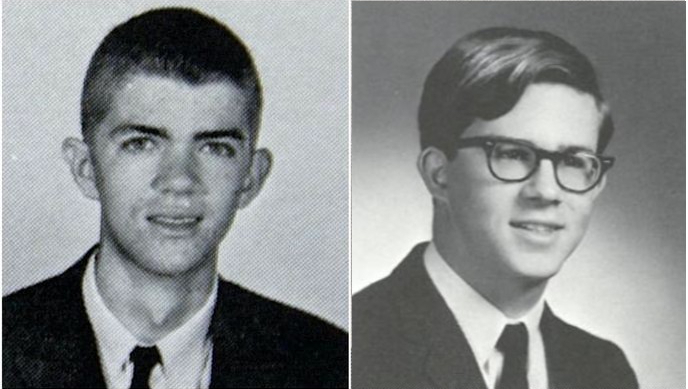
Richard Rogers (left) and Frederic Spencer (right) in the early 1970s

In 1973, when Rogers was 23, he attended the University of Maine as a graduate student. Rogers lived in a two-story house with three housemates in Orono, Maine. One of Rogers' housemates was 22 year old Frederic Alan Spencer. Rogers and Spencer were not fond of each other, but there were no instances of violence between the two prior to Spencer's death. On the afternoon of April 28, 1973, Rogers hit Spencer eight times in the back of the head with a roofing hammer. Spencer was still alive after the bludgeoning, so Rogers asphyxiated him by placing a plastic bag over his head until he died. Rogers then waited until the evening to dispose of Spencer's body. He wrapped Spencer in his nylon boy scout tent, dragged the body out of his home, past the parking lot, and into his car. He then drove down route 116 in Old Town for about a minute until he reached the Bird Stream forest, where he dumped Spencer's body.

Spencer's body was found by two cyclists on the afternoon of May 1, 1973. Police were able to identify Spencer's body after tracing a key found in his pants to a post office box he rented. Three officers then investigated the home Spencer shared with his three housemates. In Rogers's room, they discovered bloody fingerprints on the door, a bloody footprint on the floor, blood droplets across the walls, and the hammer used to kill Spencer. Rogers was subsequently taken to the Orono police barracks and interrogated. During the interrogation, he admitted to killing Spencer, but claimed it was in self-defense.

After his confession, Rogers was charged with the murder of Spencer, and pleaded not guilty. Rogers's fingerprints, height, and weight were taken. He was held in the Bangor County jail without bail for the next six months, until his trial began.

The trial for the murder of Spencer began in the Bangor Superior Court on October 29, 1973. The state was represented by Foahd Saliem, the assistant attorney general. Rogers was represented by Errol K. Paine, a local attorney. Testimony began on October 31. The first testimony was from a medical examiner, who stated that Spencer died from injuries to the head. The examiner also implied that Spencer's pinkie finger was broken during the struggle. On November 1, the trial continued, and several other witnesses testified. The last person to testify was Rogers himself.

Rogers claimed that Spencer attempted to attack him with a roofing hammer, but he got a hold of the hammer during the struggle, and hit Spencer in the head with it eight times in self-defense. Rogers then said that Spencer was still struggling, so he put a plastic bag over his head until he stopped. Rogers attempted to clean the room by throwing out a bloodstained rug. He then waited until it was dark out, put Spencer's remains in his car, and dumped his body off of Route 166. He did this because, as he claimed, "I just didn't know what to do. I wanted very much to go to the police, but by then I felt it would look very suspicious." According to observers, Rogers did an exceptional job testifying. He was calm, clear, and convincing. At the end of the day, Errol K. Paine made a request to reduce Rogers charges to manslaughter. The judge agreed, and reduced the charge. Rogers also employed the "gay panic defense", claiming that Spencer made unwanted sexual advances toward him prior to allegedly attacking him.

The trial ended the next day, on November 2, 1973. The jury, after deliberating for under three hours, reached a verdict of not guilty.

=== Nursing career ===
After his acquittal, Richard Rogers moved to New York in 1973, where he attended Pace University's school of nursing. After graduating in 1978 and earning a master's degree in science, he was hired as a nurse by Mount Sinai Hospital. He eventually became a surgical nurse and worked in the pediatric ward until his 2001 arrest.

=== 1988 assault ===
On July 11, 1988, Rogers allegedly invited a man he met from a bar in Manhattan to his Staten Island apartment. After driving the man to his apartment, Rogers asked him if he wanted something to drink. The man asked for a diet soda, but Rogers brought him orange juice. After drinking it, the man said he fell unconscious. Hours later, the man woke up, his hands and ankles bound to Rogers's bed with hospital ID bracelets. As he lay naked on his back, Rogers injected a needle into the man, causing him to lose consciousness again. A few hours later, Rogers dressed the still unconscious man and carried him out of the apartment building.

When the man woke up again, he called his friend, who drove him to the local police precinct. After reporting the assault, he went to Roosevelt hospital, where doctors ran several tests on him. They noted the bruises on a vein of his hand. He also took a rape kit, which came back as negative. Rogers was arrested for the crime in August of that year, but acquitted in a nonjury trial in December 1988.

== Last call killings ==
Between 1991 and 1993, four gay and bisexual men were lured from piano bars in Manhattan and later found dismembered and murdered in trash bins along highways in Pennsylvania, New Jersey, and New York. The perpetrator of these crimes was dubbed the "Last Call Killer" by the media, after the traditional "last call" for drinks that bartenders announce to patrons shortly before closing time of such establishments. Although Rogers was only convicted of two of these killings—those of Thomas Mulcahy and Anthony Marrero—he is suspected of committing all four of the murders.

The first known victim of the last call murders was 54-year-old Peter Stickney Anderson. On the night of May 5, 1991, Anderson was last seen alive on Lexington Avenue after drinking at the Townhouse Bar in Midtown. The following morning, Anderson's remains were discovered in a trash barrel by a maintenance worker along the westbound side of the Pennsylvania Turnpike. The worker could not lift a garbage bag in the trash barrel, so he opened it and saw Anderson's head. The worker then notified his supervisor, who called the Pennsylvania State Police. An autopsy was conducted of Anderson, which revealed that he died from multiple stab wounds to the chest and back. He was also castrated postmortem, and his penis had been placed in his mouth. Due to rigor mortis, the medical examiner determined that Anderson had died less than 37 hours prior to the discovery of his body. Anderson's identity was initially unknown, but he was later identified after his belongings were found along another stretch of the turnpike.

The next victim was Thomas Richard Mulcahy, a 57-year-old married father of four. Mulcahy, who lived in Massachusetts, visited New York in July 1992 for a business meeting. His credit card transactions traced his last known whereabouts to the Townhouse bar on July 8. On July 10, 1992, maintenance workers found five trash bags containing the partial remains of Mulcahy along Route 72 in Woodland Township, New Jersey. One bag contained intestines, a stomach, a latex glove, and a plastic cup. Mulcahy's stomach was cut in half, and placed in two bags. The fourth bag held a portion of Mulcahy's skin with a bite mark on it, and last bag had a blood-stained compass saw, a pair of latex gloves, a shower curtain, and a bedsheet in it. Two hours later, a sixth bag containing his legs was found at a picnic area of Garden State Parkway in Stafford Township, New Jersey. Mulcahy's death was caused by multiple stab wounds to the chest, and his body parts had been washed clean of blood.

The third victim was Anthony Edward Marrero, a 44-year-old gay sex worker of Manhattan. On May 10, 1993, six plastic bags containing Marrero's remains were found off Crow Hill Road in Manchester township, New Jersey. His body had been cut into seven pieces: His arms, legs, torso (which had been cut in half), and his head. Marrero's cause of death was multiple stab wounds to the back and torso, and like Mulcahy, his body parts had been cleaned. He was last seen alive around the Port Authority Bus Terminal in Manhattan.

The last known victim was Michael J. Sakara, an openly gay 56-year-old man. He was last seen alive on July 30, 1993, at the Five Oaks bar in Greenwich Village. That night, he was witnessed drinking with and talking to a man who called himself "Mark" or "John" and claimed to work as a nurse at St. Vincent's hospital. On the morning of July 31, 1993, a man found a suitcase and a bag containing Sakara's shoes, pants, shirt, and wallet at a Haverstraw Bay overlook. The man felt uneasy about the discovery, so he dropped the items off at the Haverstraw police station. A few hours later, a hot dog vendor found Sakara's head and arms wrapped in two garbage bags inside of a trash barrel. Nine days later, on August 8, the rest of his remains were found ten miles north in Stony Point, New York. Like the previous victims, Sakara's body was cut into seven pieces, and his body parts had been washed. However, although he had been stabbed five times, Sakara died from a bludgeoning.

=== Other suspected murders ===
Rogers is the prime suspect in the murder of 21-year-old Matthew John Pierro. On April 10, 1982, Pierro was found dead off a dirt road near Interstate 4 and Lake Mary Boulevard in Lake Mary, Florida. His death resulted from strangulation and six stab wounds, and his nipple had been bitten off. Shortly before his murder, Pierro was last seen leaving a gay bar in Orlando, Florida. Rogers was in the area at that time for a college reunion, and a bite mark on Pierro's body could also be a match to Rogers's teeth.

Rogers is also suspected in the 1986 murder of Jack Franklin Andrews, whose body parts were discovered in garbage bags and quilts at a rest stop along Route 8 in Litchfield, Connecticut. Andrews is also suspected of being a victim of another unidentified serial killer, who murdered and sexually mutilated at least two men in the United States between 1980 and 1986. Investigators believe that Rogers may have killed whenever he went on vacation, as he frequently traveled to California, Florida, Massachusetts, West Virginia, New Jersey, and Arkansas.

== Investigation and arrest ==
Using cyanoacrylate fuming, 28 latent fingerprints and three palm prints were recovered from the eight trash bags that held Peter Anderson's body. The prints were put into the Pennsylvania, New York, Virginia, and New Jersey databases, but no matches were found. Police soon ran out of leads and Anderson's murder became a cold case.

Police were unable to find any fingerprints at the Thomas Mulcahy crime scene. However, they found DNA in a latex glove. The DNA was entered into the FBI's Combined DNA Index System, but there were no matches. Investigators also traced the origins of the bag containing the glove to a CVS branch on Staten Island through its SKU number. A sticker on the keyhole saw used to dismember Mulcahy was traced back to the Pergament retail chain. At the time, there were 32 Pergaments in New York and New Jersey. There were two Pergaments on Staten Island, one of which was across the street from the CVS. This made detectives believe that the perpetrator lived or worked in Staten Island. Police described the way Mulcahy's body was dismembered as disarticulation, as his bones had been separated from his joints. This led investigators to believe that the perpetrator had medical experience. Police filled out a VICAP form in search of similar crimes. After learning of Peter Anderson's killing, they considered the possibility that a serial killer could be on the loose.

The bag containing Anthony Marrero's head was a limited edition Acme bag that was only distributed at select locations, including Staten Island. Two fingerprints and a palm print were also found on the bag, but the prints didn't match anything in the automated fingerprint identification systems they were entered into.

After Michael Sakara's killing, eight law enforcement agencies in New York, New Jersey, and Pennsylvania set up a task force to catch the perpetrator. A composite sketch of the suspect, who claimed to work at St. Vincent's hospital, was made from witness statements and sent to local hospitals. The New York City Gay and Lesbian Anti-Violence Project also raised a reward of $10,000 for information. Authorities also requested the names, addresses, and dates of birth of all nurse employees at St. Vincent's hospital with the first or middle name of Mark or John. From this, police found a person of interest. He was a gay man named Mark who worked at St. Vincent's as a nursing care coordinator. He had homes in Manhattan and Staten Island, and, according to rumors, he visited the Townhouse and Five Oaks bars on occasion. The man was brought in for questioning, but there was no evidence that tied him to the murders.

On August 26, 1993, an anonymous tip came in about a nurse who worked at the Mount Sinai Hospital. According to the tip, the man met the nurse at a gay bar and took him home. While the man was sleeping, the nurse tried to tie him up, but the man resisted and fled. The tipper claimed that he coincidentally met the nurse again at the Townhouse bar. The nurse asked the man to go to his home again, but the man refused. The person who sent the tip didn't know the nurse's name, so detectives requested information about all the male nurses who worked at Mount Sinai and lived in Staten Island. Photos of these men were shown to a bartender who saw Sakara with the suspect. When she saw Rogers's photo, she noted that he had similar hair to the suspect, but could not make a positive identification, so investigators moved on. The task force was later disbanded in November 1993.

In April 1999, the New Jersey State Police became aware of a fingerprint-lifting technique known as vacuum metal deposition, which used metallic vapors to make invisible and latent fingerprints visible. Gloves and over three dozen plastic bags from the crime scenes were sent to a Toronto forensic lab to be analyzed. Six months later, scientists were able to lift 35 fingerprints and a few palm prints from the evidence. Packets with the prints and details of the case were sent to the 50 states and Puerto Rico, so that they could be run through each state's individual AFIS systems. The prints were matched to Richard Rogers in Maine's fingerprint database. Rogers's prints had been on file since his 1973 arrest, but Maine's AFIS system didn't go online until 2001.

=== Arrest ===
On May 28, 2001, police approached Rogers at his job, telling him he was a victim of credit card fraud so that he would agree to be questioned. When they made it to the interrogation room, detectives told him that they were actually investigating the murders he was suspected of. Rogers admitted to knowing Michael Sakara, but after figuring out that police had linked him to the murders, Rogers requested counsel and was arrested. His bail bond was set at $1,000,000.

During a search of Rogers's home, investigators discovered more circumstantial evidence linking him to the murders. Firstly, they found a bottle of Versed, a medication commonly used as a date rape drug. Rogers's carpet fibers were also consistent with those found on Mulcahy's body, and plastic bags in his home were similar to ones the victims' body parts were wrapped in. Additionally, they discovered highlighted passages about decapitation and dismemberment in Rogers' Bible, videotapes of horror films, a New Jersey road map, and Polaroid pictures of shirtless men with stab wounds drawn on them.

== Legal proceedings ==
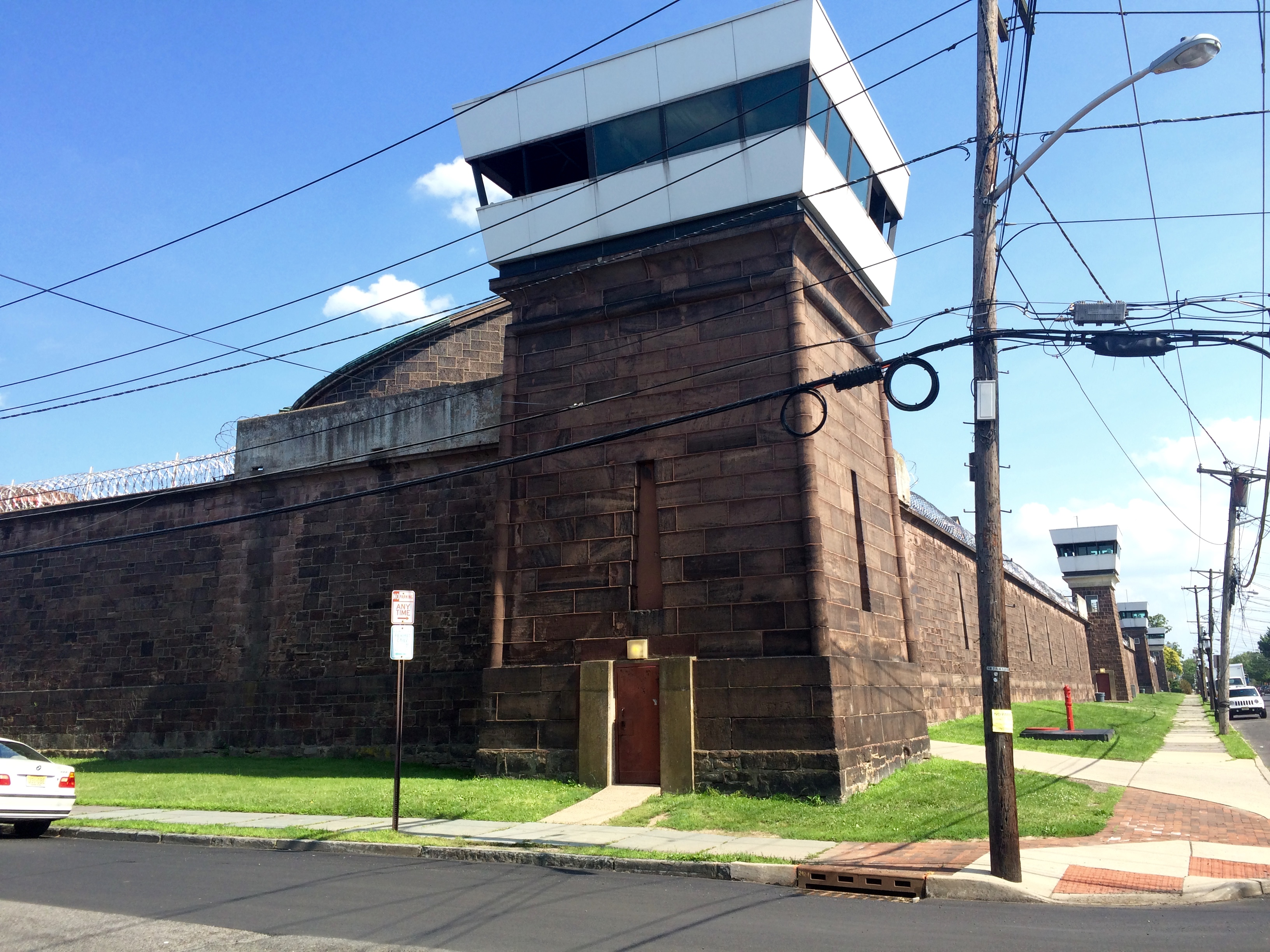
New Jersey State Prison

Rogers' trial began on October 26, 2005. Rogers was offered a plea deal during jury selection, which stated that if he pleaded guilty to manslaughter in both cases, he would receive two 32-year-sentences with the possibility of parole after 15 years. Additionally, if he pleaded guilty to third degree murder in the death of Peter Anderson, he would receive a total of 10 to 20 years in prison. Rogers said he would take it into consideration, but he ultimately declined the deal.

Several witnesses, including those who discovered the remains of the victims, detectives who investigated the case, and fingerprint comparison analysts testified at the trial. However, Rogers himself did not testify and remained quiet throughout his legal proceedings. Although Rogers was never charged in the killings of Peter Anderson and Michael Sakara, their cases were allowed to be discussed at the trial due to their similarities with the other murders. However, the killings of Frederic Spencer and John Pierro, and the 1988 assault, were not allowed to be mentioned.

In November 2005, the jury, after deliberating for three hours and 45 minutes, found Rogers guilty on all charges. Rogers reportedly showed no reaction to the verdict and continued staring at the front of the court room. Rogers is currently serving two consecutive life sentences for the two murders at New Jersey State Prison in Trenton, New Jersey.

== In media ==
=== Books ===
- Green, Elon (2021). Last Call: A True Story of Love, Lust, and Murder in Queer New York. Celadon Books. ISBN 9781250224347.

=== Television ===
- Season 14, episode 8 of Forensic Files, titled "Touch of Evil," is about the forensic science used to identify and help capture Richard Rogers.
- The true crime show Very Bad Men first aired a 22-minute episode about Richard Rogers, titled "Last Call Killer," on December 13, 2012.
- The true crime show Mark of a Killer first aired a 42-minute episode about the case, titled "Last Call Killer", on January 27, 2019.
- The A&E documentary series City Confidential first broadcast an episode about the crimes of Richard Rogers, titled "The Last Call Killer," on December 9, 2021.
- An HBO documentary series Last Call: When a Serial Killer Stalked Queer New York, which focuses on Rogers's victims, premiered on July 9, 2023.
- The Mai Tai killer in American Horror Story: NYC draws inspiration from the Last Call Killer

== See also ==
- List of serial killers in the United States
- Paul Bateson

== Bibliography ==
- Green, Elon (2021). Last Call: A True Story of Love, Lust, and Murder in Queer New York (illustrated ed.). Celadon Books. ISBN 9781250224347.
- Ramsland, Katherine (2009). The Devil's Dozen: How Cutting-Edge Forensics Took Down 12 Notorious Serial Killers (illustrated ed.). Penguin. ISBN 9780425226032.
