= Red River Road =

- Directed by: Paul Schuyler
- Written by: Paul Schuyler
- Produced by: Jady Schuyler; Paul Schuyler
- Starring: Paul Schuyler; Jade Schuyler; Shaw Schuyler; Quinn Schuyler
- Cinematography: Paul Schuyler
- Edited by: Paul Schuyler
- Music by: Cindy O'Connor; Paul Schuyler
- Production company: Wytshark Media
- Distributed by: Gravitas Ventures
- Release date: 1 October 2020
- Running time: 90 minutes
- Country: United States
- Language: English

Red River Road is a 2020 American horror thriller film directed by Paul Schuyler, starring Schuyler, Jade Schuyler, Shaw Schuyler and Quinn Schuyler.

== Plot ==
A family isolating from a global pandemic that spreads through the internet and disrupts your ability to perceive reality—often with violent consequences—begins to unravel when it is suspected that one, or all of them, may be infected.

== Cast ==
- Paul Schuyler as Anna
- Jade Schuyler as Stephen
- Shaw Schuyler as Sean
- Quinn Schuyler as Wyatt
- Art Devine as The Ranger
- Brody (the dog) as Herself

== Production ==
Red River Road was shot during the 2020 Covid lockdown in the Schuyler's own home with just the family serving as the entire cast and crew. To give the illusion that there was a larger crew at work, specific shots were designed using simple pull rigs to 'dolly' the camera while all of the family members are onscreen.

== Reception ==
Won the Spirit of Independent Cinema Award at the Stonybrook International Film Festival.

Won Best Feature at the Portland Horror Film Festival

Won Best Independent Film at A Night of Horror in Sydney Australia

Kevin Hall of the Video Librarian rated the film 4 stars out of 5 and wrote, "With the advent of AI like ChatGPT, whether or not the Internet can be trusted is a real-life concern, and one Schuyler masterfully turns on its head here."

John Noonan of FilmInk rated the film $14.00 out of $20.00 and wrote, "What Schuyler has achieved with the tools he had is certainly to be commended and the film is a testament to independent filmmaking."

Ben Bradley of Starburst wrote, "You’d be hard pushed to find a family acting together as good as we have here. When most people made bread, the Schuyler family made a rather good movie."

MontiLee Stormer of Movie Reel List "Red River Road weaves conspiracy and paranoia into what could easily be a hysterical 89 minutes of door rattling, jump scares, and yelling. Instead, there are measured steps with increasing frequencies of mistrust and fear that feel as rational as they are terrifying. The Schuylers are in effect playing themselves trapped in a nightmare scenario of missing or false information, so it’s easy to see the well of emotion each character draws from. Removing the certainty of reality in familiar places among loved ones, Red River Road skillfully turns what is already becoming a tired trope into a masterclass of independent filmmaking.
