= Arthur Tress =

American photographer (born 1940)

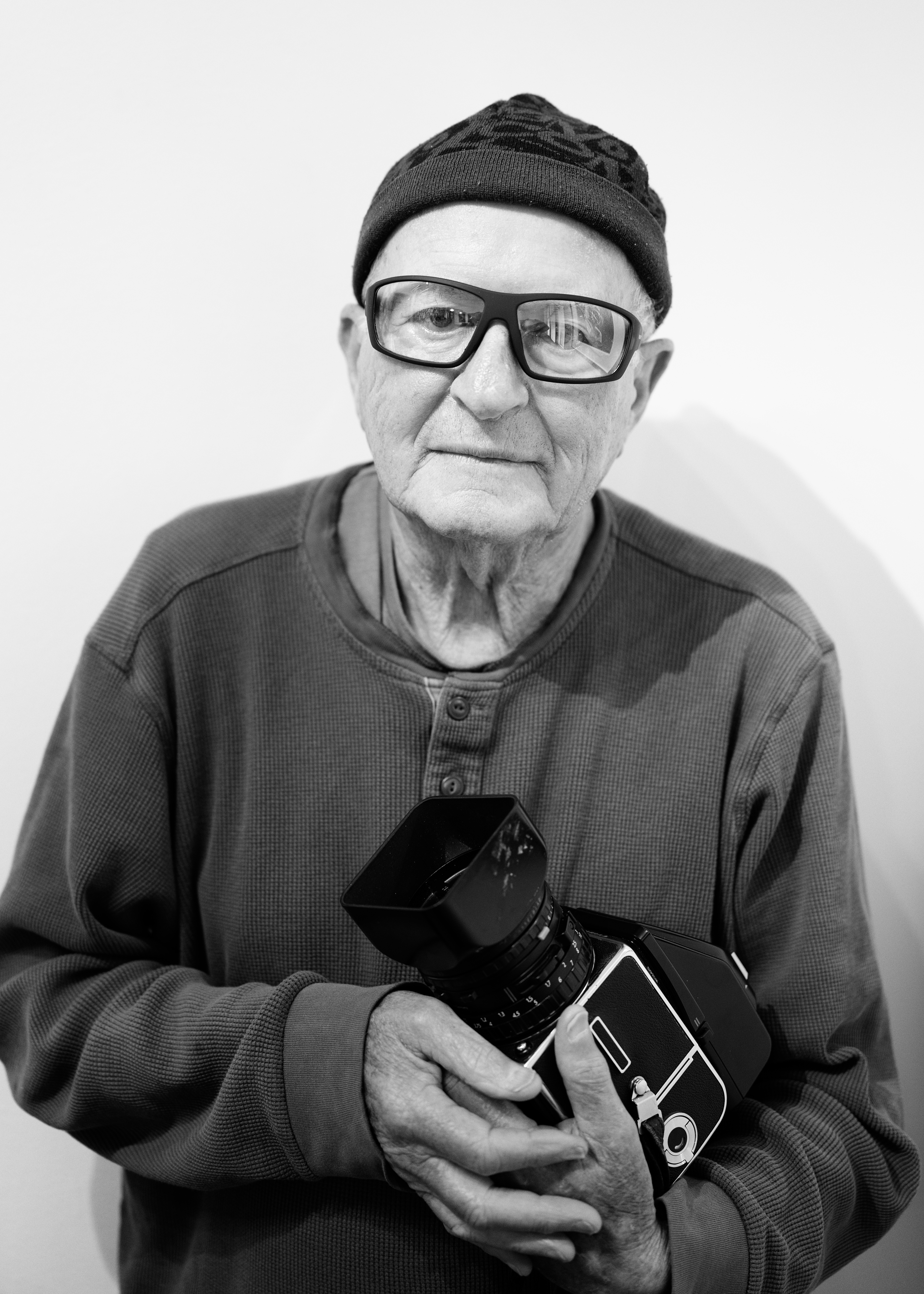
- Arthur Tress in 2024 at the Fraenkel Gallery
- Born: November 24, 1940 (age 85); Brooklyn, New York, U.S.
- Education: Bard College (BFA)
- Occupation: Photographer
- Website: www.arthurtress.com

Arthur Tress (born November 24, 1940) is an American photographer. He is known for his staged surrealism and exposition of the human body.

== Early life and education ==
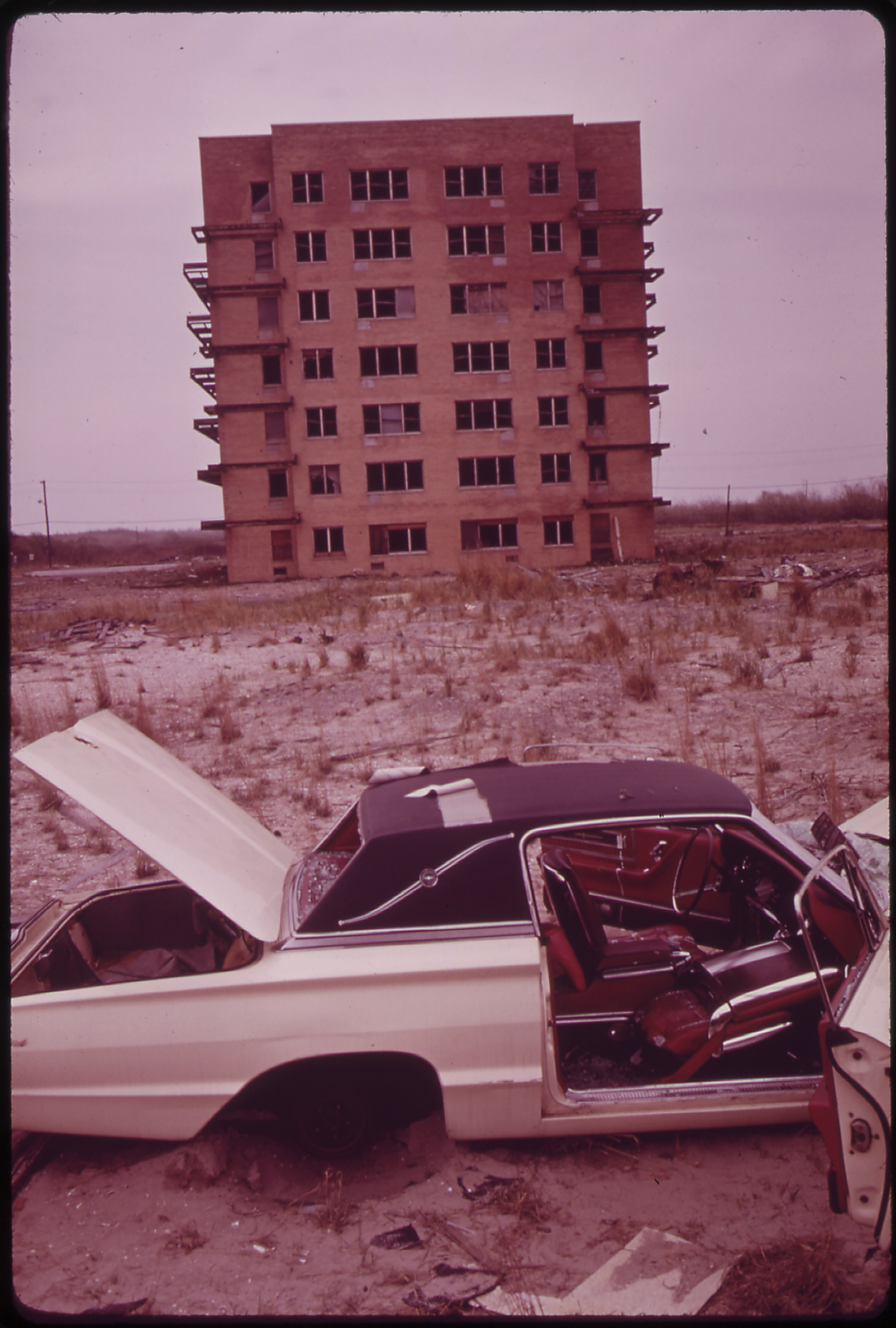
Photograph by Tress of an abandoned car and unfinished apartment house at Breezy Point, Queens, in 1973. It was taken for the Environmental Protection Agency's Documerica program to photographically document subjects of environmental concern.

Tress comes from a Jewish background; his parents immigrated from Europe. He was born in Brooklyn, New York. The youngest of four children in a divorced family, he spent time in his early life with both his father, who remarried and lived in an upper-class neighborhood, and his mother, who remained single after the divorce. His sister was the lawyer and gay rights advocate Madeleine Tress.

At age 12, he began to photograph members of the circus and dilapidated buildings around Coney Island in New York City, where he grew up. Tress has said that "growing up as a gay man in the 1950s was not easy, especially at school."

Tress attended Abraham Lincoln High School in Coney Island. He studied painting at Bard College in Annandale-on-Hudson, New York, earning a Bachelor of Fine Arts in 1962. After graduation he moved to Paris to attend film school, but soon dropped out.

== Career ==
While living in France, Tress traveled to Japan, Africa, Mexico, and throughout Europe. He observed many secluded tribes and cultures and was fascinated by the roles played by the shaman of the different groups of people. The cultures to which he was introduced would play a role in his later work. Tress spent the spring and summer of 1964 in San Francisco. He documented the 1964 Republican National Convention that nominated Barry Goldwater, civil rights demonstrations at segregated car dealerships on Van Ness Avenue, and The Beatles' 1964 world tour. Tress took over 900 photographs that were later shelved until 2009 when he rediscovered a stack of vintage prints while organising his sister's estate after her death. The work was subsequently exhibited at San Francisco's de Young Museum.

In the late 1960s, he made a series of surreal photographs about children's dreams, using staged scenarios.

Tress resided in Cambria, California, for 25 years, and now lives in San Francisco.

== Publications ==
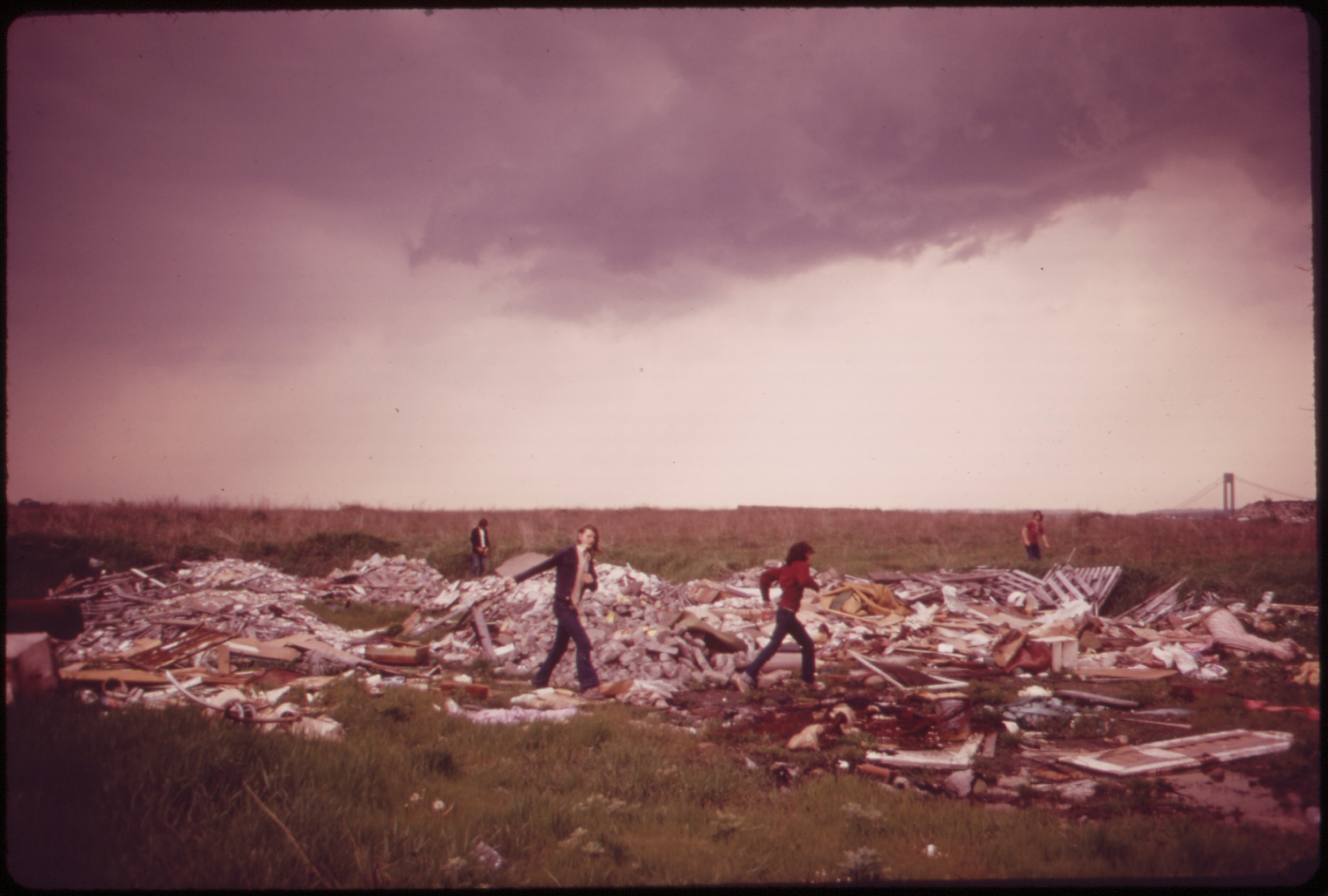
Tress's photograph of boys playing on a municipal incineration plant and landfill dump at Gravesend Bay, taken for the Documerica program

- Open Space in the Inner City: Ecology and the Urban Environment. New York: New York State Council on the Arts, 1971
- Arthur Tress: The Dream Collector. Text by John Minahan.
  - Richmond: Westover, 1972
  - New York: Avon, 1974
- Shadow. A Novel in Photographs. New York: Avon, 1975.
- Theater of the Mind. Text by Duane Michaels, Michel Tournier and A.D. Coleman. Dobbs Ferry: Morgan and Morgan, 1976.
- Reves. Text by Michel Tournier. Brussels: Complexe, 1979.
- Talisman. Edited by Marco Livingstone. Oxford: Museum of Modern Art, Oxford, 1986.
- The Teapot Opera. Photographs and text by Arthur Tress.
  - Goro International, 1986
  - Abbeville, 1988
- Male of the Species: Four Decades of Photography by Arthur Tress. Text by Michale Tournier. Fotofactory, 1999.
- Fish Tank Sonata. Bulfinch, 2000.
- Arthur Tress: Fantastic Voyage: Photographs 1956-2000. Bulfinch, 2001.
- Memories. Photographs by Arthur Tress, Poems by Guillaume Apollinaire. 21st, 2003
- Arthur Tress: Facing Up. Top Choice, 2004.
- Arthur Tress San Francisco 1964 by James Ganz. Prestel USA, 2012.
- Arthur Tress: Transréalités. France: Contrejour. 2013.
- Egypt 1963 One. Southport, England: Café Royal, 2014. Edition of 150 copies. (Note: Web page: "Egypt 1963 One and Two : Café Royal Books". Archived from the original on 2014-08-06.)
- Egypt 1963 Two. Southport, England: Café Royal, 2014. Edition of 150 copies.
- The Circle of The Orange Rubber Traffic Cone, Pot Holder, 2019. Edition of 120 copies.

== Collections ==
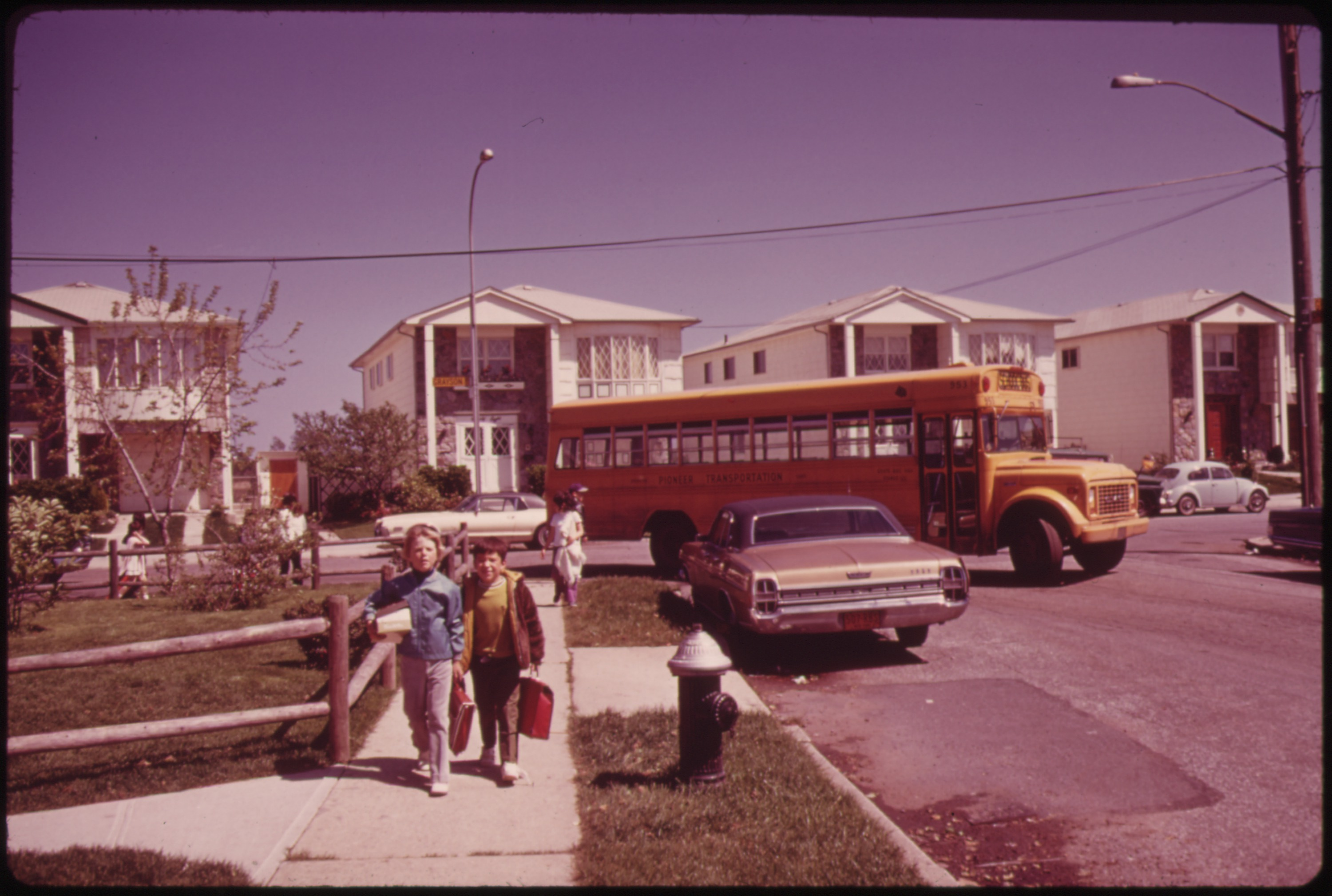
Tress's photograph of school children on their way home in Great Kills, on Staten Island, taken for the Documerica program

Tress's work is held in the following public collections:

- Bibliothèque nationale de France, Paris
- Centre Georges Pompidou, Paris: 12 prints (as of December 2019)
- George Eastman Museum, Rochester, New York: 5 prints (as of December 2019)
- Honolulu Museum of Art
- Los Angeles County Museum of Art, Los Angeles, California: 138 prints (as of December 2019)
- Metropolitan Museum of Art, New York: 3 prints (as of December 2019)
- Museum of Contemporary Photography, Chicago, Illinois: 14 prints (as of December 2019)
- Museum of Fine Arts, Houston, Texas: 14 prints (as of December 2019)
- San Francisco Museum of Modern Art, San Francisco, California: 4 prints (as of December 2019)
- Whitney Museum of Art, New York: 33 prints (as of December 2019)

== Awards ==
- 2012: Honoree: Achievement in Fine Art, Lucie Awards
