= The Most Popular Girls in School =

American stop-motion animated series

- Cast of MPGIS (Clockwise from upper left: Cameron, Shay, Jenna, Rachel, Deandra, Brittnay, Mackenzie and Trisha)
- Genre: Comedy; Stop-motion
- Created by: Mark Cope; Carlo Moss
- Starring: Kate Frisbee; Lily Vonnegut; Garrett Mendez; Andrew Delman; Carlo Moss; Haley Mancini; Afton Quast
- Country of origin: United States
- Original language: English
- No. of seasons: 5
- No. of episodes: 82 (list of episodes)

Production
- Executive producers: Mark Cope; Carlo Moss; Tiffany L. Gray; Lily Vonnegut
- Producer: Lily Vonnegut (seasons 1–4)
- Running time: 2–15 minutes
- Production companies: Extra Credit Studios; Universal Cable Productions (season 5)

Original release
- Network: YouTube
- Release: May 1, 2012 – August 29, 2017

The Most Popular Girls in School (abbreviated MPGIS) is an American adult stop-motion animated comedy web series that debuted on YouTube on May 1, 2012. Created by Mark Cope and Carlo Moss, the series animates Barbie, Ken and other fashion dolls, usually with customized costumes and hairstyles, as various characters. MPGIS follows the exploits of a fictional high school cheerleading team in Overland Park, Kansas and their friends, family and enemies. Variety described the series as "Mean Girls meets South Park". The first episode has been viewed over 11 million times, and many episodes have received views in the millions.

In April 2013, MPGIS parodied the viral email rant of Delta Gamma sorority member Rebecca Martinson by having the character Brittnay Matthews (voiced by Lily Vonnegut) reenact the so-called "Deranged Sorority Girl Email". The MPGIS video went viral itself. On May 1, 2018, Extra Credit Studios announced an in development sixth season, as well as a Patreon to crowdfund MPGIS, in addition to new spin-offs The Most Popular Girls in Quarantine, Keeping Up with the Van Burens, and Models.

== Storyline ==
The first season begins with the arrival of new student Deandra at Overland Park High School. Deandra is sought as an ally on both sides of a long-simmering feud between head cheerleader Mackenzie Zales and socialite Shay van Buren, which comes to a head as both are nominated for prom queen. Mainly concerned with bathroom privileges, Deandra plays both sides until she is literally torn apart. Other storylines this season include Mackenzie's second-in-command Brittnay Matthews breaking up with her boyfriend Blaine only for him to begin dating her rival, foreign exchange student Saison Marguerite; lonely lurker Jonathan "Than" Getslinhaumer attempting to ingratiate himself with the football team; and unpopular student Rachel Tice's sinister plan to win the title of prom queen for herself.

In the second season, the cheer squad must defend their turf when the cheer squad from Atchison begins hanging out at their mall after their own mall burned down. They agree to give the mall to whoever wins the upcoming Nationals competition, but they don't realize one of their own squad members is a double agent. Meanwhile, Saison and Blaine prepare for the birth of their baby, while Brittnay pretends to be friends with Saison in order to get on a reality TV show about teen mothers, and later is forced to let her join the squad when they are a member short. Than, deeply in denial about his sexuality, begins a relationship with Brittnay, and later kisses openly gay football player Tanner Christiansen to prove he wouldn't enjoy it; he does, and immediately comes out. Other storylines include the budding friendship between Overland Park's Trisha Cappelletti and a cheerleader at Atchison also named Trisha, Mackenzie's battle with stress-induced female pattern baldness, and Deandra's attempts to defuse the situation between Overland Park and Atchison, the school from which she transferred after an embarrassing incident.

In the third season, former squad member Jenna Darabond returns to Overland Park to enact revenge on Mackenzie, revealing that she orchestrated the events of the previous two seasons, including burning down the Atchison mall. Her newest scheme is to upset the school's social order by turning the student body into conformity-hating hipsters, which she successfully does with Rachel, Than and former cheerleaders Ashley Katchadourian and Jenna Dapananian. Having lost half the squad, Mackenzie and Brittany reluctantly team up with Shay van Buren and Saison Marguerite, while Trisha invites the other Trisha to join the squad. The cheerleaders and hipsters wage a culture war, the situation escalating when Brittnay's car is set on fire. Meanwhile, Deandra, who received bionic implants after losing her arms, joins the football team and leads them to the state championships. Than also joins the football team, but is torn between his friendship with the guys and his relationship with Jenna when she asks him to throw the game. In the end, the students renounce hipsterism and Mackenzie has Jenna arrested for the arson of the Atchison mall. Mackenzie also reveals that she was the one who destroyed Brittnay's car to manipulate Jenna's downfall. Brittnay quits the squad and renounces Mackenzie, and, in prison, Jenna is stabbed by Atchison's head cheerleader Tanya.

The fourth season takes place over the last few weeks of the girls' junior year. Brittnay is on the warpath after being betrayed by Mackenzie, and becomes a "mercenary cheerleader" for any squad that will hire her. Shay quits the squad too, and she and Brittnay plot to embarrass Mackenzie at Justin Michaelson's end-of-year party. Meanwhile, Deandra becomes a pop music sensation to get free food from the concert venues, but continually mistreats her backup artists Rachel and Judith. While helping to prepare for Justin's party, Than becomes taken with Shaw, Tanner's boyfriend's cousin with a very similar personality to Than's own, much to the chagrin of the guys, who see Shaw as a poor influence. Mackenzie hires her own mercenary cheerleaders to help with the feud, but accidentally hires real mercenaries who Brittnay is forced to fight off. Those mercenaries accidentally kill Jenna, who is in the hospital recovering from Tanya's attempted murder. At the party, Rachel and Judith abandon Deandra, ending her music career, while Than and Shaw leave the party to have sex. Trisha, who turns to the works of Ben Affleck in times of crisis, helps the two friends reconnect, and reveals that she has manipulated events so that Shay will play an embarrassing video of herself instead of the planned one of Mackenzie. Brittnay agrees to forgive Mackenzie if she trades cars with her; once Brittnay's bullet-riddled Nissan Leaf is officially in Mackenzie's possession, Brittnay blows it up.

The fifth season takes place over the following summer, when Mackenzie, Brittnay, Trisha and Trisha 2 are called to represent Team USA in a modeling competition in Paris. Upon arriving, the squad learns that the rest of Team USA has gone missing, and they are forced to recruit Deandra, Cameron van Buren, Than, and the football team, all coincidentally in France for various reasons, to replace them, though they stop short of allowing Shay to join them. As the competition commences, the gang goes out for a wild night of partying, and Tanner is horrified to wake up next to Than. Meanwhile, Brittnay, who has always believed that Saison Marguerite is French-Canadian, rather than French as she claims, follows her to gather information, but she and Deandra are kidnapped by the American-hating Team France, who were responsible for the original Team USA's disappearance. In the end, only Rachel Tice can go on for Team USA, and they win by default when Rachel's competition gets diarrhea, courtesy of a laxative placed in everyone's drinks by Shay. Tanner is relieved to find out he and Than never had sex, but Brittnay never learns that Saison is indeed from Montreal. The group are offered five-year modeling contracts, but, with the exception of graduates Trisha 2 and Cameron, they all elect to return to Overland Park for their senior year, where they vow to make Shay van Buren pay for her actions in France.

== Cast ==
=== Main ===
Voice actor	Character	Seasons				
Voice actor	Character	1	2	3	4	5
Main
Kate Frisbee	Mackenzie Zales (Note: Mackenzie was originally voiced by Marian Bruno for episodes 1 and 3, before Frisbee took over as of episode 6.)	Main	Main	Main	Main	Main
Kate Frisbee	Ashley Katchadourian	Recurring	Recurring	Recurring	Recurring	Guest
Lily Vonnegut	Brittnay Matthews	Main	Main	Main	Main	Main
Lily Vonnegut	Judith Dinsmore	Recurring	Recurring	Recurring	Main	Main
Lily Vonnegut	Mikayla Van Buren	Recurring	Recurring	Recurring	Guest	Recurring
Garrett Mendez	Trisha Cappelletti	Main	Main	Main	Main	Main
Andrew Delman	Shay Van Buren	Main	Main	Main	Main	Main
Andrew Delman	Saison Marguerite	Recurring	Recurring	Main	Main	Main
Carlo Moss	Deandra the New Girl	Main	Main	Main	Main	Main
Carlo Moss	Rachel Tice	Main	Main	Main	Main	Main
Carlo Moss	Blaine McClaine	Recurring	Main	Main	Main	Main
Haley Mancini	Trisha 2		Recurring	Main	Main	Main
Afton Quast	Jenna Darabond	Mentioned	Guest	Main	Guest	
Recurring
Pete Capella	Tanner Christiansen	Recurring	Recurring	Recurring	Recurring	Recurring
Mark Cope	Jonathan "Than" Getslinhaumer	Recurring	Recurring	Recurring	Recurring	Recurring
Ray Hebel	Tristan McKie	Guest	Recurring	Recurring	Recurring	Guest
Dave Hill	Matthew Derringer	Recurring	Recurring	Recurring	Recurring	Recurring
Dave Hill	Amberlynn Weggers	Recurring	Guest	Recurring	Recurring	
Brian Konowal	Justin Michaelson	Recurring	Recurring	Recurring	Recurring	Recurring
Aaron Krebs	Cameron Van Buren	Recurring	Guest	Recurring	Guest	Recurring
Aaron Krebs	Oisin McGrann			Recurring		
David Razowsky	Mrs. Van Buren	Guest	Guest	Recurring	Guest	Recurring
Bill Sindelar	Lunch Lady Belinda	Recurring	Guest	Recurring	Guest	Recurring
Christine Tarbet	Bridget Tice	Recurring	Guest	Recurring	Guest	
Jessie Schneiderman	Jenna Dapananian	Mentioned	Recurring	Recurring	Recurring	
Jessie Schneiderman	Chloe & Zoe					Recurring
Carla Henderson	Taylor McDevitt		Recurring			
Grace Helbig (season 2) / Betsy Beutler (season 5)	Jeannie Halverstad		Recurring			Recurring
Lee Newton	Tanya Berkowitz		Recurring	Guest		
Lee Newton	Katelynn Zales			Recurring	Guest	
Lee Newton	Sofia					Recurring
Michelle Visage	Mrs. Zales			Recurring	Guest	
Janel Benisch	Juliette Bonnet					Recurring

== Episodes ==
Season	Episodes	Originally released	
Season	Episodes	First released	Last released
1	13	May 1, 2012	November 13, 2012
2	17	March 5, 2013	July 23, 2013
3	28	November 5, 2013	May 20, 2014
4	12	January 6, 2015	March 31, 2015
5	12	June 13, 2017	August 29, 2017

== Production and broadcast ==
The Most Popular Girls in School animates Barbie, Ken and related Mattel fashion dolls, generic fashion dolls and various branded dolls, usually with customized costumes and hairstyles, as various characters. Other dolls used include Disney's, Ariel, Belle, Merida and Mother Gothel, Finnick Odair from The Hunger Games, Tyr Anasazi from Andromeda, and Oscar and Evanora from Oz the Great and Powerful. Guest voice talent has included Grace Helbig, Jason Earles, Lee Newton, Tyler Oakley, Michelle Visage, Kingsley, EpicLLOYD, Hannah Hart, and Mamrie Hart.

A March 2013 Kickstarter crowdfunding campaign funded season 2 of the series, a November 2013 Indiegogo campaign funded season 3, and a November 2014 Indiegogo campaign funded season 4.

MPGIS premiered on YouTube on May 1, 2012. The fourth season concluded on May 31, 2015, and a fifth season was not announced until April 4, 2017. A sixth season was announced at the end of the fifth-season finale episode on August 29, 2017.

As of August 2017, the series' YouTube channel has over 1 million subscribers and over 170 million views. MPGIS has also produced spin-off shows The Trisha Show and Judy and Red, as well as bonus material like "Making of" and "Behind the Scenes" videos, viewer mail Q&A and "Extra Credit" (outtakes). On May 1, 2018, Extra Credit Studios opened a Patreon to crowdfund MPGIS in addition to new spin-off shows Keeping Up with the Van Burens and Models.

== Reception ==
Variety described the series as "Mean Girls meets South Park in this trash-talking, boundary-busting high-school-set Web series, acted out by stop-motion Barbie dolls." The first episode has been viewed over 11 million times, and most episodes have received views in the millions.

In April 2013, MPGIS parodied the viral email rant of Delta Gamma sorority member Rebecca Martinson by having the character Brittnay Matthews (voiced by Lily Vonnegut) reenact Martinson's so-called "Deranged Sorority Girl Email". The MPGIS video went viral itself.

In January 2015, Variety reported that Charlize Theron's production company Denver and Delilah was developing a stop-motion animation series based on MPGIS with comic book writer Greg Rucka.

In August 2015, MPGIS was nominated for a Streamy Award for Costume Design.
