= Townhouse Bar =

Gay piano bar

Coordinates: 40°45′37″N 73°57′56.5″W

Townhouse Bar of New York
- Logo

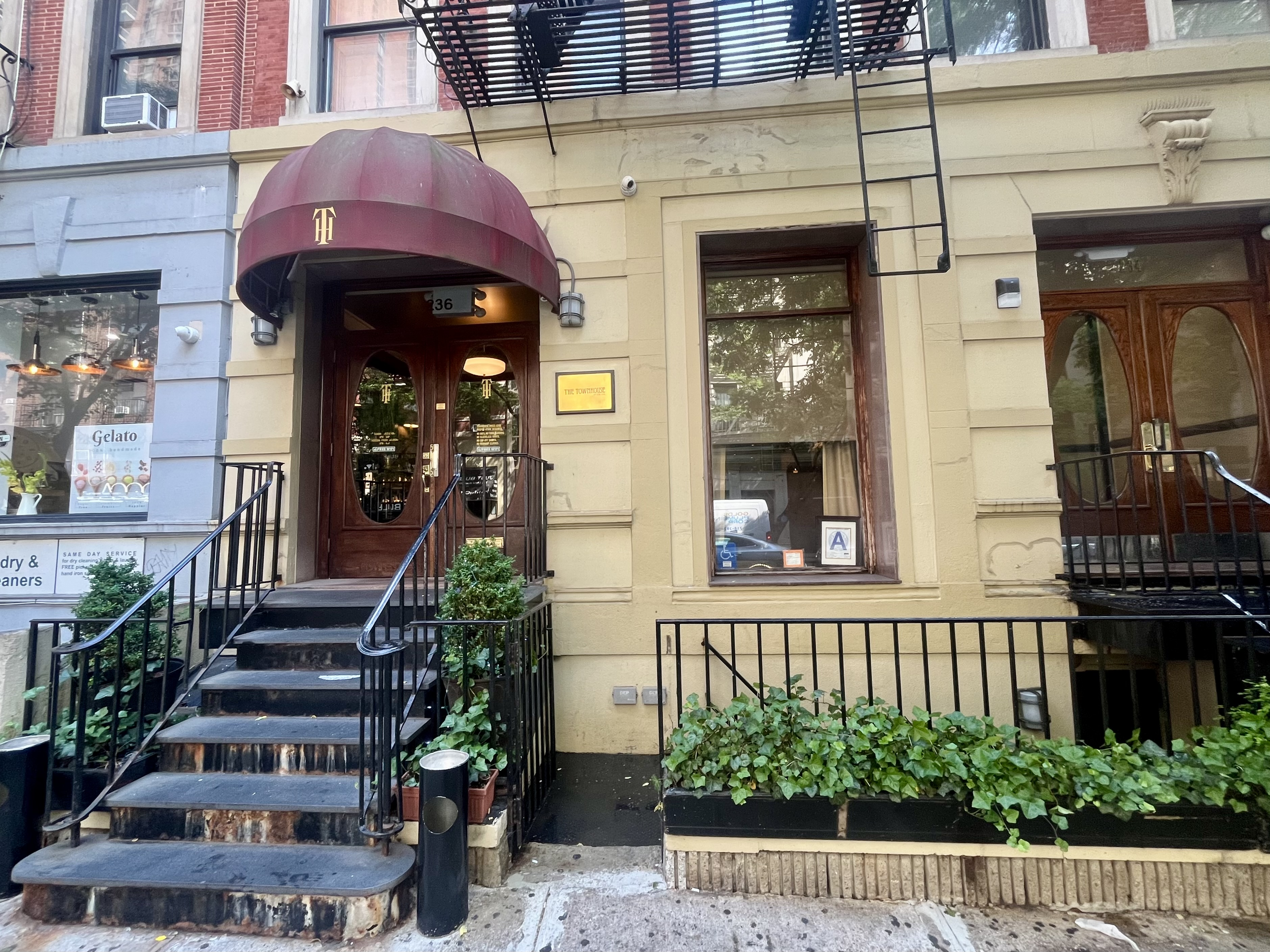
- The bar's exterior in 2024
- Interactive map of Townhouse Bar of New York
- Address: 236 East 58th Street
- Location: Midtown East, Manhattan, New York City
- Type: Gay bar; Piano bar

Construction
- Opened: 1989

Website
- thetownhousenyc.com

The Townhouse Bar of New York, or simply The Townhouse, is an upscale gay piano bar which opened in 1989. It is located in the Midtown East, Manhattan neighborhood of New York City.

== Description ==
The front room of the Townhouse building is a cocktail lounge with architectural prints and soft background music, while the back room features a piano bar with nightly performances and open mic singing along with everybody sing-a-longs. There is also a downstairs club room. A conservative dress code is enforced compared to other gay bars.

The bar's clientele has been described as a "well-educated, distinguished and cultured crowd" largely over 30. Media outlets have characterized the bar as a place where younger men seek out sugar daddies.

== History ==
The Townhouse was established in 1989 by boutique shop owner Paul Galluccio and his partner Michael Grummons. Galluccio was inspired to start his own bar after being denied entry to another establishment. The venue was originally designed to offer a more sophisticated experience than other gay bars at the time, and to attract businessmen from Park and Madison Avenues. In 2019, 30 years after the bar first opened, Galluccio and Grummons were still co-owners. Galluccio died in 2021.

The bar was the last location where two victims of serial killer Richard Rogers (also known as the Last Call Killer) were seen before their murders in 1991. The victims were 54-year-old investment banker Peter Anderson and 57-year-old computer sales representative Thomas Mulcahy, both of whom were in New York City on business.

In April 2020, longtime Townhouse pianist Rick Unterberg died of COVID-19 at the age of 61.

Real Housewives of New York City star Luann de Lesseps made headlines in 2022 after getting kicked out of the bar for drunken behavior. She subsequently issued a public apology.
