= Castration serial murders =

Unsolved serial murder case in the United States

Details
- Victims: 2–5+
- Span of crimes: 1980 – 1986 (confirmed)
- Country: United States
- States: Wyoming, Pennsylvania, Utah, Georgia, Connecticut; Others possible
- Date apprehended: Never apprehended

The castration serial murders were a series of murders of young men committed in at least five American states between 1980 and 1986. All the victims were kidnapped, shot in the back of the head and castrated post-mortem, from which the case got its namesake. They were initially considered unrelated due to the crime scenes' geographic remoteness until 1989, when forensic evidence concluded that two of the victims had been killed with the same revolver, with the other three likely being related as well.

== Victims ==
- The first suspected victim was 27-year-old oilfield worker Willard Edward Judd, found August 10, 1980, on the banks of the North Platte River approximately 20 miles away from Casper, Wyoming. Judd, who was known to hitchhike, had been shot ten times in the head and torso with a .38 caliber revolver, and then possibly sexually mutilated by his killer. However, in 1982, a South Dakota prison inmate serving time for murder implicated two other men in Judd's murder, alleging all four men were involved in a drug ring and Judd was caught 'skimming'. 25-year-old Durke Pace, who had been incarcerated since June 1981 for a murder he and his wife committed that month, pointed the finger at two acquaintances who were subsequently investigated and cleared of any involvement in Judd's murder. However, because Pace knew details about Judd's murder that hadn't been released, authorities believed he had some involvement, but were not able to find enough evidence to charge him. If he were responsible, that would rule out Willard Judd's murder from being connected to the others in this series.
- On August 19, 1981, the naked body of 30-year-old Wayne Leigh Rifendifer was found in a wooded area of Jersey Shore, Pennsylvania, about 6 miles away from the I-80. Subsequent investigations established that Rifendifer last resided in Bridgeport, Connecticut, and traveled cross-country as a hitchhiker.
- On June 14, 1982, the naked, mutilated body of 21-year-old Marty James Shook was discovered by a fisherman in Daniels Pass, a mountain pass in Heber City, Utah, off the U-40. Investigators quickly established that Shook was a hitchhiker who was last seen alive two days prior in Sparks, Nevada. A witness found by police claimed to have seen a young woman with blond hair around the area where his body was later found. The mysterious woman was said to have also been a hitchhiker who wanted to leave the state for Kansas. She's been proposed as a potential suspect in the case, but neither her identity or whereabouts were ever discovered.
- In July 1983, the almost completely naked body of another unidentified victim, wearing only a swimsuit, was found in Georgia. Little information has been publicly revealed about this victim.
- On November 26, 1986, the dismembered remains of 26-year-old Jack Franklin Andrews were found near Litchfield, Connecticut. Andrews had an extensive criminal history with arrests in California, Kansas, Florida, Tennessee, and Oregon for various crimes, but had never been suspected of any crimes in Connecticut. After killing Andrews, his murderer castrated him and then proceeded to mutilate the corpse, cutting off the legs and head from the torso. The victim was successfully identified via DNA fingerprinting.

== Investigation ==
In November 1989, a forensic ballistic examination revealed that Rifendifer and Shook had both been shot with the same .38 caliber revolver, possibly of Charter Arms manufacture. Since the victims were found close to roads frequented by truck drivers, the investigators suggested that their killer might be a truck driver or a door-to-door salesman, after which they requested that the FBI conduct a psychological portrait of their offender.

In 1991, FBI agent Terry Green, then-director of the VICAP program, suggested that due to the fact that no similar killings have occurred after 1986, it was more than likely that the offender is either deceased, imprisoned for another crime or has left the United States.

In the 2000s, the police arrested a resident of San Francisco, California, in whose house a can of preservative fluid was found, containing a severed human scrotum. It was sent for examination in an attempt to extract a tissue sample to establish the identity of the victim, but due to the long-term conservation of the scrotum, no DNA could be extracted. After examining the edges and shapes of the victims' wounds from photographs taken during the original investigations, the forensic pathologist concluded that the scrotum did not belong to any of the known victims. None of the killings have been solved, and are considered cold cases.

== See also ==
- List of serial killers in the United States
