= Pride (miniseries) =

- Genre: Documentary
- Country of origin: United States
- Original language: English
- No. of episodes: 6

Production
- Executive producers: Christine Vachon; Sydney Foos; Danny Gabai; Alex Stapleton; Kama Kaina
- Producers: Funmi Akinyode; Megan Goedewaagen; Marc Smolwitz; Kate Bolger
- Cinematography: Ellen Kuras; Aaron Kovalchik; Michelle Crenshaw; Allen Jacobsen; Mego Lin; Christine Ng; Michael Beach Nichols
- Editors: John F. Lyons; Rosella Tursi; Genéa Gaudet; Christine Khalafian
- Running time: 41-47 minutes
- Production companies: FXP; Killer Films; Vice Studios

Original release
- Network: FX
- Release: May 14 – May 21, 2021

Pride is an American documentary television miniseries revolving around LGBT rights in the United States decade-by-decade. It consists of 6 episodes and premiered on May 14, 2021, on FX.

== Synopsis ==
The series follows LGBT rights in the United States decade-by-decade beginning with the 1950s. Episode 1 features the story of LGBT rights activist, lawyer and memoirist Madeleine Tress.

It features appearances by Christine Jorgensen, Flawless Sabrina, Ceyenne Doroshow, Susan Stryker, Kate Bornstein, Dean Spade, Raquel Willis, Christine Vachon, Margaret Cho, John Waters, Jewelle Gomez, Ann Northrop, Zackary Drucker, Jules Gill-Peterson, CeCe McDonald, Brontez Purnell, B. Ruby Rich, Chase Strangio, Michael Musto and Tez Anderson, among other writers and LGBT historians.

== Episodes ==
| No. | Title | Directed by | Original release date | U.S. viewers (millions) |
|---|---|---|---|---|
| 1 | "1950s: People Had Parties" | Tom Kalin | May 14, 2021 | N/A |
| 2 | "1960s: Riots & Revolutions" | Andrew Ahn | May 14, 2021 | N/A |
| 3 | "1970s: The Vanguard of Struggle" | Cheryl Dunye | May 14, 2021 | N/A |
| 4 | "1980s: Underground" | Anthony Caronna; Alex Smith | May 21, 2021 | N/A |
| 5 | "1990s: The Culture Wars" | Yance Ford | May 21, 2021 | N/A |
| 6 | "2000s: Y2Gay" | Ro Haber | May 21, 2021 | N/A |

== Production ==
In August 2019, it was announced FX had ordered a documentary series about LGBT rights in the United States with Killer Films, Vice Studios and Refinery29 set to produce. In March 2021, it was announced Tom Kalin, Andrew Ahn, Cheryl Dunye, Anthony Caronna, Alex Smith and Ro Haber would serve as directors on the series, with Refinery29 no longer attached. Production began in April 2021 in Greenwich Village, Lower Manhattan, the site of the June 1969 Stonewall Riots, considered widely to be the catalyst for the gay rights movement.

== Reception ==
Pride has been receiving favorable critical acclaim. On review aggregator Rotten Tomatoes, the series has an approval rating of 100% based on 12 reviews, with an average rating of 7.5/10. On Metacritic, the series has a weighted average score of 72 out of 100 based on reviews from 9 critics, indicating "generally favorable reviews".

=== Accolades ===
| Year | Award | Category | Recipient(s) | Result | Ref. |
|---|---|---|---|---|---|
| 2022 | GLAAD Media Awards | Outstanding Documentary | Pride | Nominated | |
