= List of The Most Popular Girls in School episodes =

Cast of MPGIS (Clockwise from upper left: Cameron, Shay, Jenna, Rachel, Deandra, Brittnay, Mackenzie and Trisha)

The Most Popular Girls in School (abbreviated MPGIS) is an American stop-motion animated comedy web series that debuted on YouTube on May 1, 2012. Created by Mark Cope and Carlo Moss, the series animates Barbie, Ken and other fashion dolls, usually with customized costumes and hairstyles, as various characters. MPGIS follows the exploits of the fictional Overland Park High School cheerleading squad and their friends, family and enemies. Variety described the series as "Mean Girls meets South Park". To date, over 80 episodes have been released. The first episode has been viewed 11 million times, and many episodes have received views in the millions. After a year-long hiatus, the fifth season premiered on June 13, 2017.

== Series overview ==
Season	Episodes	Originally released	
Season	Episodes	First released	Last released
1	13	May 1, 2012	November 13, 2012
2	17	March 5, 2013	July 23, 2013
3	28	November 5, 2013	May 20, 2014
4	12	January 6, 2015	March 31, 2015
5	12	June 13, 2017	August 29, 2017

== Episodes ==
=== Season 1 (2012) ===
No. overall	No. in season	Title	Original release date	Length
1	1	"The New Girl"	May 1, 2012	2:57
Popular cheerleaders Mackenzie Zales and Trisha Cappelletti confront a transfer student named Deandra who attempts to use their restricted restroom.
2	2	"French Class"	May 1, 2012	4:39
Cheerleader Brittnay Matthews argues with her quarterback boyfriend Blaine over how to spend their date night, while French exchange student Saison Marguerite tries to remember her third period lesson.
3	3	"Sister Act"	May 1, 2012	3:52
After Deandra's dramatic walkout, Mackenzie and Trisha are ambushed in the toilets by angry popular student Shay van Buren, her younger sister Mikayla and older sister Cameron, who accuse Mackenzie of calling Shay a liar. They demand an apology and a redistribution of their respective territories under threat of ruining Mackenzie's reputation.
4	4	"The Most Popular Boys in School"	May 1, 2012	4:18
In the boys' locker room, the football team's intention to shower is interrupted by the smug Jonathan Getslinhaumer—a lurker who is desperate to be part of the cool crowd but who always says the wrong things.
5	5	"$57 Lunch"	May 22, 2012	4:13
While ordering food in the school lunchroom, Deandra is confronted by the three Van Buren sisters, who are desperately looking for allies in their new feud with the "DNA-guzzling cheerleaders".
6	6	"The Letter Zero"	June 19, 2012	3:58
After meeting Deandra for the first time, Brittnay is disgusted to discover that Mackenzie wants Deandra to join their cheerleading squad, as well as the new feud with the powerful Van Buren sisters.
7	7	"The Least Popular Girls in School"	July 3, 2012	2:36
Unpopular seniors Rachel Tice and Judith gloat over their "diabolical" strategy to become as popular as the Van Burens and the cheerleaders. They are interrupted by Rachel's moody older sister Bridget.
8	8	"3rd Grade"	July 31, 2012	7:42
Shay tells Deandra the history of her hatred towards Mackenzie, in a flashback to a recess during the third grade in elementary school.
9	9	"Pre Pep Rally Energy Drinks"	August 21, 2012	5:05
Mackenzie, Brittnay and Trisha miss the high school pep rally when their energy drinks are spiked with laxatives, soon confirmed by Deandra to be the work of the Van Burens. (Previously titled "Semen on Root Beer")
10	10	"Gay Van Buren"	September 12, 2012	7:51
While the cheerleaders stress over prom dates, Shay and Deandra wait for the announcement of the prom queen finalists.
11	11	"Deandra's Arms"	October 2, 2012	6:25
The Van Buren sisters and the cheerleaders discover that Deandra has been a double agent for both sides. When they grab her and each try to drag her to their meetings, a horrible accident occurs.
12	12	"Prom (Part 1)"	November 6, 2012	8:48
The "All Dogs Go to Heaven Under the Sea in Hawaii" prom begins. Ashley is left in tears when Brittnay kisses her boyfriend, Mackenzie cannot stand her night being ruined, and Deandra is pretty hopeful that she will win prom queen due to a pity vote.
13	13	"Prom (Part 2)"	November 13, 2012	8:28
Rachel and Judith's master plan takes effect as the finalists for prom queen await the results.

=== Season 2 (2013) ===
No. overall	No. in season	Title	Original release date	Length
14	1	"Pregnant Meme"	March 5, 2013	7:19
When the school janitor discovers a pregnancy test in the girls' bathroom, Trisha tries to discover which girl at school is having a baby. (Previously titled "Pregnant")
15	2	"The New Reality"	March 12, 2013	4:39
In the aftermath of prom, Rachel and Judith hope that their plan has made them very popular.
16	3	"Fatherhood"	March 19, 2013	7:24
Tanner tries to show Blaine, who has impregnated Saison Marguerite, the importance of being a father.
17	4	"Justice and a Slim Jim"	March 29, 2013	7:20
The Van Burens sisters drag Deandra with them to buy Zinfandel for their alcoholic mother.
18	5	"Atchison"	April 9, 2013	9:30
Mackenzie is diagnosed with female pattern baldness, linked to her stress levels. When she meets up with the other cheerleaders at their shopping mall, they are shocked to discover cheerleaders from Aitchison High (Tanya, Taylor and another Trisha) on their turf. Guest starring Lee Newton.
19	6	"Reality Bites"	April 16, 2013	6:49
Brittnay finds out that Saison is being filmed for a reality show, Babes Having Babies, and tries to get in on it.
20	7	"Babes Having Babies"	April 23, 2013	8:41
An episode of the teen pregnancy reality show reveals the supposed close friendship between Brittnay, Shay and Saison, as well as the fatherly preparations that Blaine is trying to make. Around the fiasco, Mackenzie and many others show obvious upset and confusion as the cameras record the friendly trio's antics.
21	8	"Cheer Practice"	May 7, 2013	7:33
Remembering that Deandra was a former student at Atchison High, Mackenzie asks her for secret information about the Atchison cheerleading squad.
22	9	"Miss Cinnabon"	May 14, 2013	11:13
Deandra runs into the Atchison cheerleaders at the mall and warns them of Overland Park's dangerous ways. Guest starring Lee Newton.
23	10	"Date Night"	May 21, 2013	8:15
A date night for Brittany and Than turns into a double date with Tristan and Tanner.
24	11	"Pizza Street"	May 28, 2013	9:46
The Van Buren sisters seek solace at a fast food restaurant after discovering that their mother Jayna is not pregnant. Their server is Bridget Tice, creating tension.
25	12	"Fun Times at Oak Park Mall"	June 4, 2013	9:27
At the mall, Mackenzie tries to hide her alopecia from Tanya, while Brittnay and Taylor fight and the Trishas bond. Guest starring Lee Newton.
26	13	"Cheer Tryouts"	June 18, 2013	8:56
The Cheer Squad hosts cheer tryouts to see who will help them crush Atchison at Cheer Nationals. The Babes Having Babies producers want to give Brittnay her own show.
27	14	"Epic Cheerleader Meltdown"	June 25, 2013	12:04
Now that she is famous, Brittany breaks up with non-famous Than, who she also suspects is gay. Than makes out with Tanner to prove he is straight, but instead he comes out.
28	15	"Cheer Nationals (Part 1)"	July 9, 2013	11:49
At Cheer Nationals, Ashley turns up as a member of the Atchison cheer squad, leaving Overland Park a girl short. Guest starring Lee Newton and Grace Helbig.
29	16	"Cheer Nationals (Part 2)"	July 16, 2013	12:52
After working out that Ashley was working for Atchison, Deandra comes to the rescue, even if it means telling her backstory about her embarrassing end as head cheerleader. Atchison steals Overland Park's routine, but Deandra has a trick up her sleeve. Guest starring Lee Newton and Grace Helbig.
30	17	"Cheer Nationals (Part 3)"	July 23, 2013	11:37
Overland Park has a chance to defeat Atchison. Guest starring Lee Newton and Grace Helbig.

=== Season 3 (2013–14) ===
No. overall	No. in season	Title	Original release date	Length
31	1	"Mr. McNeely"	November 5, 2013	9:32
Jenna Darabond returns to Overland Park after a mysterious disappearance. Guest starring Tyler Oakley.
32	2	"Hamlet"	November 12, 2013	6:10
The feud continues, and Jenna warns the Cheer Squad that she is bringing a storm of Hipsterism to Overland Park. Guest starring Tyler Oakley.
33	3	"Little Miss Overland Park"	November 19, 2013	12:39
The Van Burens turn up at the 2013 Little Miss Overland Park pageant for Mikayla, where the rise of Hipsterism results in a unique winner. Guest starring Michelle Visage and Lee Newton.
34	4	"A Very Deandra Thanksgiving"	November 26, 2013	8:58
Deandra sets out to consume as many Thanksgiving meals around town as possible. Guest starring Michelle Visage and Lee Newton.
35	5	"Farmers' Market"	December 3, 2013	9:07
The Cheer Squad are shocked when their pep rally is canceled for a farmers' market.
36	6	"After School Activities"	December 10, 2013	11:25
The Cheer Squad and Jenna's hipster collective both seek new members.
37	7	"Bestie Day"	December 17, 2013	7:22
Brittnay and Tristan go on a shopping spree at the mall while Justin quits the football team and turns full hipster.
38	8	"Mall Santa"	December 24, 2013	8:45
At Christmastime, Santa's Grotto opens in Overland Park Mall. Guest starring Jason Earles and Lee Newton.
39	9	"New Year's Party"	December 31, 2013	8:59
The Cheer Squad evaluate their year. Guest starring Jason Earles and Lee Newton.
40	10	"This is Gonna Suck"	January 7, 2014	8:55
The Cheer Squad must turn to their enemies for help.
41	11	"Taco Taco"	January 14, 2014	8:52
Deandra and her robotic arm seem to be exactly what the football team are looking for.
42	12	"Dr. Greg Converse"	January 21, 2014	11:23
Now that Shay is Head Cheerleader, she calls in someone to help sort out their status issue. Guest starring Kingsley.
43	13	"New Cheer Uniforms"	January 28, 2014	8:10
The Cheer Squad needs new uniforms. Guest starring Kingsley.
44	14	"Hipster Coffee Shop"	February 4, 2014	6:43
Jenna and her hipster collective hang out at the coffee shop. Than's loyalty is questioned when he announces that he is on the football team.
45	15	"Hipster Baby"	February 11, 2014	8:26
Mackenzie has a nightmare about Saison's baby, and Jenna reassesses Than's usefulness on the football team.
46	16	"Pizza Street Buffet"	February 18, 2014	9:08
Jenna shares her intentions for Than on the football team, but he is torn when a buffet for the Cheer Squad and Football team opens up some feelings.
47	17	"Vintage Cheer Uniforms"	February 26, 2014	9:19
Mackenzie and Brittnay are shocked to find Jenna Darabond and Jenna Dapananian wearing their discarded cheer uniforms.
48	18	"Van Buren Family Strategy Meeting"	March 4, 2014	9:31
The Cheer Squad strategize plans to win over the hipsters. Guest starring Lee Newton.
49	19	"Follow the Leader"	March 11, 2014	10:58
The Cheer Squad annoy the hipsters by following them to their favorite hangouts, and someone sets Brittnay’s car on fire.
50	20	"Parent Teacher Conference"	March 18, 2014	10:23
After Brittnay punches Jenna Darabond in the nose for blowing up her car, Mr. Mack calls for a parent-teacher conference. Guest starring Grace Helbig, Hannah Hart, Mamrie Hart, Tyler Oakley and EpicLLOYD.
51	21	"Role Play"	March 25, 2014	9:00
The conference commences. Guest starring Grace Helbig, Hannah Hart, Mamrie Hart, Tyler Oakley, EpicLLOYD and Michelle Visage.
52	22	"Wanna See Some Pictures?"	April 1, 2014	10:27
The conference ends with Jenna getting off unpunished and the Cheer Squad getting a warning. (Previously titled "Boobs Boobs Boobs") Guest starring Grace Helbig, Hannah Hart, Mamrie Hart, Tyler Oakley, EpicLLOYD and Michelle Visage.
53	23	"Cafeteria Baby"	April 9, 2014	12:13
When Saison's water breaks in the cafeteria, Deandra, Belinda and Trisha must help deliver the baby safely.
54	24	"State Semi-Finals"	April 15, 2014	8:26
The State Semi-Finals are going great for Overland Park, and after the game Mackenzie borrows Deandra's arm.
55	25	"State Championship (Part 1)"	April 30, 2014	12:39
The Cheer Squad, football team and hipsters prepare for their make or break moment of the year.
56	26	"State Championship (Part 2)"	May 6, 2014	9:44
Judith, Rachel and Jenna Dapananian catch up with Than to make sure he is going to stop the football from winning, but he has doubts.
57	27	"State Championship (Part 3)"	May 13, 2014	9:48
The football game of the year begins, while the concert put on by the hipsters starts to deteriorate.
58	28	"State Championship (Part 4)"	May 20, 2014	12:17
Mackenzie's plan to ruins the lives of the hipsters commences. In a post-credits scene, Jenna gets stabbed by Tanya in prison.

=== Season 4 (2015) ===
No. overall	No. in season	Title	Original release date	Length
59	1	"Bring Me Everyone"	January 6, 2015	10:17
After Mackenzie secretly betrays Brittnay to win over the hipsters, Brittnay goes on a rampage in revenge.
60	2	"Brittnay's First Day"	January 13, 2015	11:08
Back in 3rd Grade, it's Brittnay's first day.
61	3	"This Isn't Going to End Well"	January 20, 2015	10:02
Jenna Dapananian finds musical talent in Deandra, while Brittnay comes to formally resign from the Cheer Squad.
62	4	"Shaw"	January 27, 2015	11:58
Tristan's cousin Shaw turns up at the end of year party, and Shay cannot be bothered to deal with the Cheer Squad.
63	5	"Mercenary Cheerleader"	February 3, 2015	10:47
Brittany shoots a promotional video for her mercenary cheerleader campaign with the help of Trisha, and Deandra hears her song in Oak Park Mall.
64	6	"Cheer Tots"	February 10, 2015	9:46
Shaw and Than connect, while Trisha is able to put Brittnay in charge of a Cheer Squad ... of toddlers. Guest starring Lee Newton.
65	7	"Van Buren Family Reunion"	February 17, 2015	12:57
After obtaining Mackenzie's video, Brittnay and Shay decide to visit the annual Van Buren Family Reunion. Meanwhile, Mackenzie realizes that her video has been stolen. Guest starring Lee Newton and Michelle Visage.
66	8	"Featuring Daft Poop"	February 24, 2015	9:33
Rachel and Judith learn that they are no longer part of Deanna and the Poops. Meanwhile, new members join the cheer squad.
67	9	"Crank Hard With a Last Action Cliffhanger"	March 10, 2015	11:40
Mackenzie assigns her new cheer members to retrieve the video from Brittnay, but after getting some advice from Trisha, Mackenzie decides to call off the mission, but the new members decide to carry out the mission themselves. The mercenaries attack Brittnay while she's on her way to the party, but Brittnay fights back and demands revenge.
68	10	"End of the Year Party (Part 1)"	March 17, 2015	8:31
After arriving to the party late, the boys tells Than that Shaw is a bad influence on him and that they should stop hanging out. Meanwhile, Rachel and Judith are getting fed up with how Deandra and Jenna are treating them.
69	11	"End of the Year Party (Part 2)"	March 24, 2015	7:35
Brittnay arrives at the party and declines Mackenzie's apology. Meanwhile, Rachel and Judith leave the band.
70	12	"End of the Year Party (Part 3)"	March 31, 2015	15:24
Trisha brings Brittnay and Mackenzie together and tells them that they need to stop fighting and be friends again. Brittnay and Mackenzie reconcile while Deandra's music career comes to an end. Meanwhile, Trisha switches the video of Mackenzie with a video exposing Shay of talking bad about other students. Shay tells them that she will get her revenge.

=== Season 5 (2017) ===
No. overall	No. in season	Title	Original release date	Length
71	1	"Summer Abroad"	June 13, 2017	10:55
During summer break, Mackenzie is invited to represent Team USA at the L'Oréal International Junior Modeling tournament in Paris, and takes her friends along. On the plane, they soon find that everyone else from school is going to Paris for their own reasons.
72	2	"Bonjour"	June 20, 2017	10:00
The Overland Park contingent arrives in Paris. Mackenzie and the cheer squad meet with Jeannie Halverstad, and are confronted by the captains of the French modeling team.
73	3	"The Louvre"	June 27, 2017	10:34
Mackenzie and Brittnay recruit Deandra for Team USA, while the Trishas find the boys at a nude beach. (Previously titled "Nude Beach")
74	4	"The New Team USA"	July 4, 2017	10:50
The girls secure their final team member—Cameron—and Jeannie assesses the talent of her new Team USA.
75	5	"Glow Up"	July 11, 2017	11:19
Brittnay tasks Rachel and Judith to follow Saison. Team USA has a fitting at an exclusive fashion house, and Shay vows vengeance for being kept off the team.
76	6	"Hand Modeling"	July 18, 2017	12:52
Team USA competes in the first day of the tournament, and discovers that the drinking age in France is 16.
77	7	"The Morning After"	July 25, 2017	9:23
The competition continues in the aftermath of a wild night of drinking, and Team USA does not fare well.
78	8	"Cake Eaters"	August 1, 2017	10:22
Mackenzie tries to inspire Team USA to step up their game. They overthrow Jeannie when they discover her courting the French team.
79	9	"The Truth"	August 8, 2017	11:51
While Trisha and Than win in the Couture category, Tanner confesses his one night stand, and Tristan breaks up with him. Brittnay and Deandra are abducted before they can discover Saison's true nationality.
80	10	"Hansel & Gretel"	August 15, 2017	10:37
Team France holds Brittnay and Deandra captive alongside the original Team USA.
81	11	"Taken"	August 22, 2017	15:06
Tanner learns that he and Than did not actually have sex. Saison and Mackenzie attempt to save Brittnay and Deandra.
82	12	"The Final Walk"	August 29, 2017	14:25
The team has to give Rachel a makeover when she becomes the only American willing and able to compete in the final round.
