= Last Call: When a Serial Killer Stalked Queer New York =

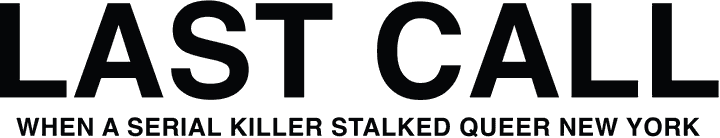
- Genre: Documentary
- Directed by: Anthony Caronna
- Music by: Ariel Marx
- Country of origin: United States
- Original language: English
- No. of episodes: 4

Production
- Executive producers: Anthony Caronna; Howard Gertler; Liz Garbus; Dan Cogan; Jon Bardin; Kate Barry; Elon Green; Charlize Theron; Beth Kono; A.J. Dix; Matt Maher; Nancy Abraham; Lisa Heller; Tina Nguyen
- Producers: Grace Fardella; Yusef Alsuhaimi
- Cinematography: Michael Beach Nichols
- Editors: Rosella Tursi; Krystalline Armendariz; Christopher K. Walker; Mikaela Shwer
- Running time: 51-59 minutes
- Production companies: HBO Documentary Films; Story Syndicate; Little Punk; Denver and Delilah Productions

Original release
- Network: HBO
- Release: July 9 – July 30, 2023

Last Call: When a Serial Killer Stalked Queer New York is an American true crime documentary miniseries directed by Anthony Caronna. It is based upon Last Call: A True Story of Love, Lust, and Murder in Queer New York by Elon Green, and focuses on the victims of serial killer Richard Rogers, who murdered and dismembered at least two gay and bisexual men between 1992 and 1993. It premiered on July 9, 2023, on HBO. It received positive reviews from critics, praising its direction and handling of the subject matter.

== Premise ==
In the 1990s, Richard Rogers, a serial killer known as the Last Call Killer, preys upon four gay men in New York, New Jersey, and Pennsylvania, including two closeted men in their 50s. The series is based on Elon Green's Edgar-winning 2021 book Last Call: A True Story of Love, Lust, and Murder in Queer New York, documenting each murder, the etymology of Rogers' nickname, coverage of his crimes, which included tabloid stories that harbored a homophobic tone, and even an obituary that described one victim in dismissive terms, as Caronna suggests, "because of how society viewed him." The series focuses on the victims, with screen time focusing on accounts of the deceased by their surviving loved ones, and does not mention Rogers' name until the end of the third and penultimate episode. The series also examines how biases in the criminal justice system reflected attitudes toward gay men at the time, and how activists who spent decades uniting the LGBTQ community came into conflict with law enforcement who opposed joining an interstate investigate task force. These included officials of the New York City Police Department, such as Commissioner Raymond Kelly, who was a member of the openly homophobic Emerald Society.

== Episodes ==
No.	Title	Directed by	Original release date	U.S. viewers (millions)
1	"Peter then Thomas"	Anthony Caronna	July 9, 2023	N/A
2	"Tony"	Anthony Caronna	July 16, 2023	N/A
This episode focuses primarily on Anthony Marrero, a 44-year-old Latino sex worker whose murder perplexed the NYPD, which had perceived the killer to have targeted older Caucasians from higher economic strata. The episode examines the reaction to Marrero's killing on the part of the underground gay community, including an attempted victim of Rogers who speaks anonymously about his encounter with an individual whose behavior seemed to match the serial killer in question.
3	"Michael"	Anthony Caronna	July 23, 2023	N/A
4	"Fred"	Anthony Caronna	July 30, 2023	N/A

== Production ==
Howard Gertler was approached by Liz Garbus and Dan Cogan to produce a potential project based upon the book Last Call: A True Story of Love, Lust, and Murder in Queer New York by Elon Green, and approached Anthony Caronna. Caronna initially turned down the project after being approached by a different company, for fear of re-traumatizing the community, but was later convinced by Gertler to join the project, after being told the focus of the series would primarily be on the victims, and activists who pushed the police to intervene, rather than focus primarily on the killer.

Gertler explained that the filmmakers did not want "to create something that would re-traumatize the family members of the victims," and wanted to approach the subject matter in a way that was guided by among other things, the perspectives of that community. Caronna explained that "Richard's backstory was never the most interesting thing to Howard and I. We weren't really interested in telling that story," or in psychoanalyzing him. Caronna stated that they wished to avoid the luridness that can result from focusing on such killers, and that he and the other producers saw the project as an opportunity to show how members of the queer community were ignored or maligned by institutions that included the New York media outlets. As an example, Caronna points to The New York Times' characterization of the then-unidentified killer as "the 'gay-slay' killer because that phrase exhibited "a catchy, if-it-bleeds-it-leads rhyme to it."

Caronna and Gertler wanted the series to go beyond the book and examine the how and why the killings occurred, and the lack of police interference. They worked alongside Nikita Shepherd, an LGBT historian who guided them through major figures and events that shaped the public perception towards LGBT people. They additionally underwent trauma training prior to production due to the series dark subject matter. Meghan Doherty, a co-producer on the project, tracked down family members of the victims and a former potential victim of Rogers.

In June 2023, it was announced Anthony Caronna had directed the series, with Liz Garbus and Charlize Theron serving as executive producers, with HBO producing and distributing.

== Reception ==
On the review aggregator website Rotten Tomatoes, 100% of 20 critics' reviews are positive, with an average rating of 8.00/10. The website's consensus reads: "Disturbing and infuriating, Last Call is a raw account of murder and injustice as well as a restorative portrait of a community." On Metacritic, the series has a weighted average score of 85 out of 100, based on 10 critics, indicating "universal acclaim".

Kristen Baldwin, reviewing the series for Entertainment Weekly, gave it an "A-", saying it was "powerful and infuriating". Baldwin lauded the program for how it successfully examined, in a "thoughtful, well-paced" manner, how the disconnect between the LGBT community and local authorities not only hampered the investigation into Rogers' crimes, but persists to the present day. Baldwin called the series "an emotional and educational odyssey that transcends the standard boundaries of true crime."

Judy Berman, reviewing Last Call for Time magazine, praised the series for focusing on Rogers' victims and their loved ones, rather than on Rogers himself, a departure from other documentaries on serial killers, as well as contemporary coverage of Rogers' crimes, which Berman characterized as "salacious" and "dehumanizing", and which she stated falsely portrayed members of the LGBT community as "abject, lonely outsiders." Berman lauded Caronna for the compassion his treatment of the subject showed these individuals, as well as for his concision and attention to detail in how he structured the series.
