= Madeleine Tress =

American employment lawyer, LGBT rights activist and memoirist

- Born: November 27, 1932
- Died: September 26, 2009 (aged 76)
- Education: Georgetown University
- Occupations: Lawyer, business owner
- Known for: LGBT rights
- Notable work: Rainbows on my Ceiling

Madeleine Tress (1932–2009) was an American employment lawyer, LGBT rights activist and memoirist who worked in Washington, D.C., and San Francisco. She lost her job working for the U.S. government in the 1950s as a direct result of the lavender scare.

== Early life and education ==
Tress was born in Brooklyn, New York, in 1932 to a Jewish family.

She was a graduate of Georgetown University and also earned degrees from the London School of Economics, New York University and UC Berkeley.

== Professional career ==
In the 1950s, Tress worked as a business economist for the Department of Commerce in Washington, D.C. In 1958 she was interrogated by the U.S. government for being a lesbian while working as a civil servant. After losing her job in the State Department due to the Lavender scare, Tress began working as a lawyer.

=== Legal career ===
Tress had a longtime career as a lawyer and ran her own firm in the city of San Francisco. John Wahl, the executor of Harvey Milk's estate, served as her legal mentor. Tress also argued a case about job discrimination at the Supreme Court.

In the 1980s she owned a San Francisco business which specialized in cat artifacts named Wholly Cats.

In this period she also served as executive vice-president of the Fireman's Fund Insurance.

== Political activism ==
Tress was a longtime resident of San Francisco who was very civically active on behalf of a variety of civil rights issues. Tress was a longtime gay rights activist. Her papers are housed at the ONE National Gay & Lesbian Archives and the University of Southern California. Additional materials related to Tress's activism are available at the San Francisco Public Library as part of the Len Evans papers.

=== Participation in LGBT marches ===
Tress and her partner Jan Sibley attended LGBT marches in San Francisco yearly starting in 1983. They also attended the 1993 March on Washington for Lesbian, Gay and Bi Equal Rights and Liberation. In Rainbows on My Ceiling, she documented her participation in this march writing, "Gays had just been barred from the military. Cammemeyer was kicked out of the Army for being a lesbian and thousands of gay men were dying of AIDS...It was the right time to tell Washington how we felt."

== Publications ==
=== Rainbows on My Ceiling ===
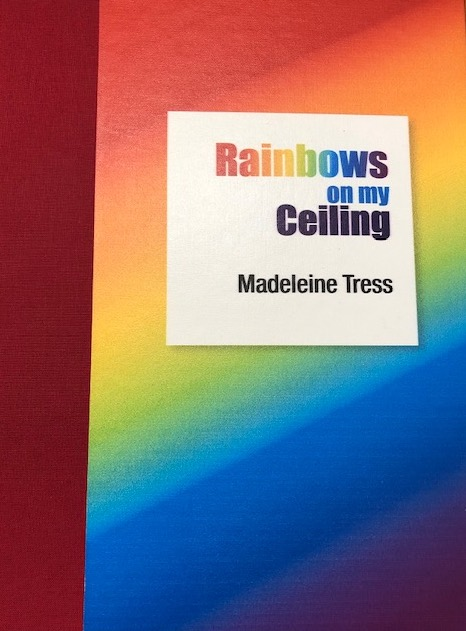
Rainbows on my Ceiling by Tress.

In 2006 Tress self-published a memoir titled Rainbows on My Ceiling. She hoped her story would have a wider readership as in the book she wrote "I...want my book to be an Oprah selection." The book documented her childhood as well as her activism in the gay rights movement. The book also includes information about her long term relationship with partner Sibley. Tress donated a copy of this book to the San Francisco Public Library. In this memoir she wrote extensively about her life with Sibley after she died. According to Tress, "There is nothing like the death of a loved one to split your life apart. You feel like you are both before and after...Like the Tlingit Indians I believe that the rainbow is a communication device from the living to the dead."

=== Jewish philanthropy ===
Tress wrote about Jewish philanthropy. Her work was published in a 1991 essay titled, "Tradition and Transition in Jewish Women's Philanthropy."

=== "Halakha, Zionism, and Gender: The Case of Gush Emunim ===
In 1994 Tress published an article on Judaism titled, "Halakha, Zionism, and Gender: The Case of Gush Emunim" which appeared in the book, Identity Politics & Women: cultural Reassertions and Feminisms in International Perspective. The book was edited by Valentine M. Moghadam.

== Later years ==
In 1998 Tress wrote a letter to the editor of the San Francisco Examiner arguing President Bill Clinton should step down as a result of the Clinton–Lewinsky scandal. She wrote he should resign after giving a "strong State of the Union address, offer an apology to his wife and daughter (if nothing else for his stupidity in being set up) and turn over the reins to Vice President Al Gore."

== Portrayal in the media ==
Actress Cynthia Nixon read as Tress in the 2017 film The Lavender Scare. In the 2021 six -part documentary Pride, Tress was portrayed by actress Alia Shawkat.

== Personal life ==
Her brother is the photographer Arthur Tress.

She lived for decades with her partner, teacher Jan Sibley, who she met in 1962.

Tress died on September 26, 2009.

== See also ==
- Pride (American TV series)
