= Daniels Pass =

Mountain Pass in Wasatch County, Utah

- Strawberry Daniels Pass
- Location within Utah
- Elevation: 8,020 ft (2,440 m)
- Traversed by: US 40

Third Approach
- Location: Wasatch County, Utah; United States
- Range: Uinta Mountains
- Coordinates: 40°17′50″N 111°15′08″W

Daniels Pass (elevation 8,020 feet [2,440 m]) is a high mountain pass in Wasatch County, Utah traversed by U.S. Route 40. It is the summit of Daniels Canyon on the road between Heber and Strawberry Reservoir. The pass is located within the Uinta National Forest and just inside the Uintah and Ouray Indian Reservation.
