= FilmInk =

Australian film magazine and website

- Editor: Erin Free
- Categories: Film
- Publisher: Dov Kornits
- Founder: Dov Kornits and Colin Fraser
- First issue: July 1997
- Company: FKP International Exports
- Country: Australia
- Based in: Randwick, New South Wales
- Language: English
- Website: filmink.com.au
- ISSN: 1447-0012

FilmInk is an Australian film magazine published by FKP International Exports. It was founded by current publisher Dov Kornits and Colin Fraser in July 1997, in Sydney. The magazine has been through many changes over the course of its existence, beginning as a black-and-white free press publication with Hoyts, and evolving into a glossy newsstand title. In February 2011, FilmInk became the first film magazine in the world to release an application for online tablet reading, with the magazine sold through the iTunes Store, and going through another major change. In 2016, the magazine released its final print version of the magazine as it transitioned into an online-only format. FilmInk is a consumer-based publication that covers all types of films, from arthouse releases to the biggest blockbusters. It focuses primarily on Australian films and covers every local release in detail.

== Regular features ==
FilmInk features content from Australia and abroad. It reviews mainstream films, local pictures, and arthouse and independent fare.

Common elements include the extended "front of the book" section called "Keeping It Reel" with small features like "New Faces", "Dumb Ideas", "Hollywood Arseholes", "Talking Movies", "Director's Cut", "Cameo", "Icon", "FilmInk Loves", "Backstory", "Role Model", "Premiere", "quoteUNQUOTE" and "What's Wrong With the Australian Film Industry with Reg Diplock, the peoples critic".

== DVD and video ==
FilmInk also extensively covers all available cinematic and DVD releases, as well as a "Home" section focusing on DVD culture.

== Film distribution ==
In 2019, the company announced that it was branching out into theatrical distribution in Australia as "Filmink Presents", starting with Wrinkles the Clown. They have since began online distribution as well.
