= Wrinkles the Clown =

American documentary comedy horror film

- Promotional release poster
- Directed by: Michael Beach Nichols
- Written by: Michael Beach Nichols; Christopher K. Walker
- Produced by: Jennie Bedusa; Mike Dill; Jon Lullo; Lowell Shapiro; Brendan Walter
- Starring: Wrinkles the Clown
- Cinematography: Michael Beach Nichols
- Edited by: Christopher K. Walker
- Music by: T. Griffin
- Production company: Crush Pictures
- Distributed by: Magnet Releasing
- Release date: October 4, 2019
- Running time: 75 minutes
- Country: United States
- Language: English
- Box office: $14,938

Wrinkles the Clown is a 2019 American documentary comedy horror film directed by Michael Beach Nichols. The film follows a man known as Wrinkles the Clown who lives in Naples, Florida. For a fee of "a few hundred dollars", he will attend birthdays, scare misbehaving kids, and prank people.

The film was released in the United States on October 4, 2019 (which, coincidentally, was the release date of another film centered around a clown, Joker) by Magnet Releasing.

== Background ==
Wrinkles the Clown is a character created by an unidentified performance artist living in Naples, Florida, United States, as part of an elaborate art project. Wrinkles presents himself as a curmudgeonly homeless clown, that parents can hire to scare children. Despite his offer to come into people's homes and frighten their misbehaving children for "a few hundred dollars", the artist has never actually accepted one of these jobs and all of the videos of Wrinkles scaring families are staged.

In a November 2015 interview with the Washington Post, Wrinkles provided a fictional biography that he presented to the journalists as if it was his real life. He claims to be a 65-year-old retired and divorced veteran who moved to Naples, Florida, from Rhode Island sometime around 2009. Not satisfied with being a "boring retiree," Wrinkles bought his distinctive clown mask online and started to make stickers and business cards promoting his telephone number. Over the next few years, Wrinkles grew in popularity. Florida teenagers posted photos taken of Wrinkles on social media and Wrinkles himself said that he now receives "hundreds of phone calls a day".

== Production ==
On February 3, 2016, local filmmaker Cary Longchamps started a Kickstarter campaign to raise money for a documentary about Wrinkles. The project was ultimately unsuccessful, with 87 backers donating $3,853 of the needed $45,000. Shortly afterwards, it was announced that Wrinkles had entered talks with other Los Angeles-based production companies to produce the film. In December 2016, Naples Daily News uncovered details which found that the media attention on Wrinkles in late 2015 was initially generated through viral marketing efforts from Longchamps, with one of the first online videos featuring Wrinkles being filmed at Longchamps' residence. However, Longchamps denies these claims, stating that the video set at his home was a coincidence. The sheriff's department of Collier County, Florida, has also stated it has not received any reports of "creepy clowns stalking neighborhoods, or walking the streets" with the intent to scare until the 2016 clown sightings. None of these sightings were confirmed to have occurred by the Collier County sheriff's department.

On August 27, 2019, it was reported by Variety that Magnet Releasing, a subsidiary of Magnolia Pictures that specializes in foreign and genre films, had purchased the rights to the documentary. The documentary, entitled Wrinkles the Clown, was released in the United States on October 4, 2019.

== Premise ==
In 2015, a video is uploaded to YouTube depicting a clown named Wrinkles emerging from beneath a young girl's bed. It quickly goes viral. In the following months, it is revealed that Wrinkles is a professional clown in Florida who offers his services to the parents of misbehaving children, showing up to frighten them unannounced as a deterrent to future bad behavior. Stickers bearing Wrinkles' face and phone number begin appearing all over Florida and thousands of people begin calling it for various reasons, from parents wanting to hire Wrinkles to people making death threats. Over the course of the next four years, Wrinkles becomes an object of folklore both locally in Florida and across the United States, with children routinely calling the number either alone or with friends as a sort of rite of passage. Additionally, further videos appear depicting Wrinkles either frightening people outside their homes or engaging in disturbing behavior, such as waving to motorists from a darkened roadside.

In 2019, Wrinkles agrees to allow a documentary crew to follow him in his daily life and explain his philosophy. Wrinkles is revealed as an elderly homeless man who lives in a van in the woods outside of Naples, Florida and spends much of his free time fishing, drinking, and going to strip clubs, occasionally using the money he makes from his appearances as Wrinkles to check into motels. He claims to have no personal ideology and states that he only works as Wrinkles for the money.

Discussions with Wrinkles are intercut with interviews with a variety of individuals discussing the phenomenon, including a psychologist who debates whether Wrinkles' behavior is abusive; folklore experts who compare Wrinkles to a contemporary Bloody Mary and other mythic rituals that figure prominently in American adolescence; a historian who explores the history of the evil clown trope, tying it back to Punch and Judy; and a professional clown unhappy with the recent negative attention that Wrinkles and the remake of Stephen King's It have brought to the profession. The documentary crew further discusses Wrinkles with a number of children around America who have been impacted by his videos, from a young girl who wishes to fight him to an aspiring horror filmmaker inspired by Wrinkles' YouTube videos to begin conceptualizing his own movies. The documentary crew also examines the Wrinkles phenomenon in the context of the 2016 clown sightings.

Midway through the documentary it is revealed that the man the crew has been following is in fact an actor named D.B. Lambert, hired by the "real" Wrinkles, a Florida performance artist, to portray Wrinkles' secret identity. Wrinkles explains that both characters were created as part of an elaborate art project. With his face blurred out, the real Wrinkles shows the documentary crew behind-the-scenes footage depicting the making of various Wrinkles videos; he further reveals that he has never actually gone to anyone's house, and that all the videos depicting Wrinkles frightening children were in fact made with the participation of actors. Wrinkles expresses satisfaction with the impact the project has had while contemplating its future, and the role it has had in contemporary American pop culture.

== Cast ==
- Benjamin Radford (as himself)
- D.B. Lambert (as himself and "Wrinkles the Clown")
- Unidentified performance artist known as Wrinkles the Clown (as himself)

== Release ==
=== Critical response ===
On the review aggregator Rotten Tomatoes, Wrinkles the Clown holds an approval rating of 68%, based on 31 reviews, with an average rating of 6.6/10. On Metacritic, the film has a weighted average score of 53 out of 100, based on 8 critics, indicating "mixed or average reviews".
