= Howard Gertler =

- Occupation: Film producer
- Years active: 1999–present

Howard Gertler is an American film producer. He has produced narrative and documentary films including Shortbus (2006), World's Greatest Dad (2009), How to Survive a Plague (2012), How to Talk to Girls at Parties (2017), Crip Camp (2020), and the Peabody Award-winning documentary All the Beauty and the Bloodshed (2022). He has been nominated for two Academy Awards and a BAFTA.

== Career ==
While at Princeton University, Gertler served as an intern at Good Machine, where he decided to become a producer. Gertler additionally served as head of production at Process Media from 2001 to 2011. Gertler founded Little Punk, a production company.

Gertler served as a producer on the narrative films Shortbus and How to Talk to Girls at Parties directed by John Cameron Mitchell.

In 2012, Gertler served as a producer on How to Survive a Plague directed by David France, which he was nominated for an Academy Award. In 2014, Gertler served as a producer on Do I Sound Gay?.

In 2020, Gertler served as an executive producer on Crip Camp directed by James LeBrecht and Nicole Newnham which was nominated for Academy Award for Best Documentary Feature.

In 2022, Gertler served as a producer on All the Beauty and the Bloodshed directed by Laura Poitras, for which won a Peabody Award and was nominated for an Academy Award and BAFTA.

In 2023, Gertler served as an executive producer on Last Call: When a Serial Killer Stalked Queer New York directed by Anthony Caronna, and executive produced by Liz Garbus and Charlize Theron for HBO.

== Personal life ==
Gertler is gay.
